= Dead or Alive Paradise =

2010 video game

- North American cover art
- Developer: Project Venus
- Publisher: Tecmo Koei
- Director: Yoshinori Ueda
- Artist: Yasushi Nakanura
- Series: Dead or Alive Xtreme
- Platform: PlayStation Portable
- Release: March 30, 2010: NA: March 30, 2010; EU: April 1, 2010; JP: April 2, 2010
- Genres: Sports, casino
- Mode: Single-player

Dead or Alive Paradise (Note: Japanese: DEAD OR ALIVE Paradise(デッドオアアライブパラダイス), Hepburn: Deddo oa Araibu Paradaisu; also known as DOA Paradise or DOAP) is a 2010 video game developed by Project Venus and published by Tecmo Koei for the PlayStation Portable as part of the Dead or Alive series. It is a PSP port of Dead or Alive Xtreme 2 for the Xbox 360, expanding upon the activities available in the original which consisted of mainly beach-related minigames.

It was the first game in the series to be released for the portable game system, as well as the first release from the series since the departure of series' creator Tomonobu Itagaki. The game was met with mostly mixed-to-negative critical reception.

== Gameplay ==
Hitomi in the poolhopping minigame

Players start the game at the getaway resort, New Zack Island, as part of a two-week vacation. The island is inhabited mostly by the swimsuit-clad girls from the Dead or Alive series. The game has several gameplay aspects, featured most prominently is the beach volleyball minigame similar to Dead or Alive Xtreme 2. The other minigames include pool games like swimming pool hopping and butt battles as well as casino games like poker, blackjack and slots. The second aspect of the game consists of interacting with the girls by mingling with them, giving them presents such as new swimwear. The third aspect is to purchase a camera from the Island Shop and take photographs of the girls which can then be assembled into an album. Once the relationship with the girls is on an intimate level, the girls would then present the player with "venus clips" which can be viewed and edited by the player. A code was also discovered in the game dubbed "Emperor's New Clothes", which allowed the player to have the girls nude, although certain inappropriate parts are not shown.

=== Characters ===
The game features the same playable characters as Dead or Alive Xtreme 2: Ayane, Christie, Helena, Hitomi, Kasumi, Kokoro, Leifang, Lisa, and Tina with an additional guest character from Rakushou! Pachi-Slot Sengen, Rio Rollins Tachibana. Rio is voiced by Marina Inoue in Japanese and Ali Hillis in English.

== Development and release ==
The previous team leader of Team Ninja, Tomonobu Itagaki had previously expressed interest in bringing the Dead or Alive Xtreme series to handhelds such as the Nintendo DS and PlayStation Portable in 2004. The game was first revealed in Japanese gaming magazine Famitsu in December 2009. A North American release was announced a month later in January 2010. Paradise is the first game in the series not to be developed by Team Ninja. Regarding Dead or Alive Xtreme 3, when questioned about it, Team Ninja's Yosuke Hayashi implied that he would consider making Dead or Alive Xtreme 3 if people stated their support for it on Team Ninja's official Twitter account.

On March 11, 2010, a DRM-free demo version was released on the Japanese PlayStation Store, and then distributed by Japanese website 4Gamer and other web sites. The demo features a sample of the game's Gravure Mode, where the player chooses a character, a swimsuit and a situation to take photos. In the demo, Hitomi is the only available character, with two bikinis and three situations. Unlike in the full version, the pictures cannot be saved in the demo. The demo can currently be downloaded on PSP demo specialized web sites, as well as in the game's official Japanese website.

The game was released in all regions during March and April 2010. In Japan, Dead or Alive Paradise had on its release, other than the stand-alone game, two different bundles: one costing ¥7,329 and the other costing ¥15,729. The first comes with a secret photo album, a soundtrack CD, an original Kasumi box cover and the game. The second one is bundled with all that plus a Kasumi figurine, which wears two different swimsuits.

== Reception ==
Reception

Aggregate score
Aggregator	Score
Metacritic	38/100

Review scores
Publication	Score
Eurogamer	3/10
Famitsu	8/10, 6/10, 8/10, 7/10
Game Informer	4/10
GamePro	5/10
GamesRadar+	7/10
IGN	5/10

Dead or Alive Paradise has received generally mixed-to-negative reviews, resulting in a Metacritic score of only 38/100. Scott Jones and Victor Lucas from Reviews on the Run both gave the game a 0.0/10 rating saying the best word to describe the game is "pathetic". On the other hand, GamesRadar gave it a relatively high score of 7/10 saying on its verdict that it is "overall fun and deceptively deep."

=== Controversy ===
The Entertainment Software Rating Board (ESRB) classification has described Dead or Alive Paradise as filled with "creepy voyeurism" and "bizarre, misguided notions of what women really want." The original text was rewritten later and ESRB apologized saying the first post was posted "in error", considering it "improperly" and filled with "subjective language." Producer Yoshinori Ueda said that the game is not supposed to be softcore pornography, neither degrading towards women. However, art director Yasushi Nakamura also implied that if fans did masturbate to the series, Team Ninja "could consider that a success". He also said that Paradise was an effort to restart making the Dead or Alive series, as well as to broaden its appeal.
