= Yūko Nagashima =

Japanese voice actress (born 1970)

- 永島 由子
- Born: July 3, 1970 (age 55)
- Occupation: Voice actress
- Years active: 1992–present
- Agent: Amuleto
- Spouse: Yōji Ueda (m. 2006)
- Children: 1

Yūko Nagashima (永島 由子, Nagashima Yūko) (born July 3, 1970) is a Japanese voice actress who is affiliated with Amuleto. She formerly worked for Aoni Production. She gained more popularity through her roles Rina Takamiya in Saint Tail along with Kōsuke Okano, Yayoi Aida in Slam Dunk and Sakai in You're Under Arrest alongside Tokyo Seiyū Compatriot Sakiko Tamagawa.

== Notable voice roles ==
=== Television animation ===
- Slam Dunk (1993) – Yayoi Aida
- Sailor Moon R (1993) – Grade school student
- Sailor Moon S (1994) – Nurse
- Magic Knight Rayearth (1994) – Caldina
- Sailor Moon Supers (1995) – Manemaneko
- Martian Successor Nadesico (1996) – Erina Won
- Naruto (2005) – Tsubaki
- Non Non Biyori Repeat (2015) – Hotaru's Mother

==== Unknown date ====
- Ceres, The Celestial Legend – Gladys Smithson
- Eden's Bowy – Fennis, young Yorn
- One Piece – Arbell
- Peacemaker Kurogane – Yamazaki Ayumu
- Rizelmine – Natsumi Ibata
- Saint Seiya – Eurydice
- s-CRY-ed – Mimori Kiryu
- Shinzo – Fairy (26)
- Slayers – Additional Voices

=== OVA ===
- Megami Paradise (1995) – Angela
- Miyuki-chan in Wonderland (1995) – Bunny-san, Cho Li
- You're Under Arrest (1995) – Reiko Sakai
- Debutante Detective Corps (1996) – Miyuki Ayanokouji
- Voltage Fighter Gowcaizer (1996) – Suzu Asahina/Platonic Slave
- Variable Geo (1997) – Erina Goldsmith

=== Theatrical animation ===
- Sailor Moon S: The Movie (1994) – Snow Dancer
- Martian Successor Nadesico: The Motion Picture – Prince of Darkness (1998) – Erina Kinjo Won
- Crayon Shin-chan: The Storm Called: The Battle of the Warring States (2002) – Waitress

=== Tokusatsu ===
- Gridman the Hyper Agent (1993) – Security, Video cameras

=== Video games ===
- Gokujō Parodius! ～Kako no Eikō o Motomete～ (1994) – Hikaru (Mini-drama in CD)
- Voltage Fighter Gowcaizer (1995) – Suzu Asahina
- Super Real Mahjong P7 (1997) – Serika Randoh
- Money Puzzle Exchanger (1997) – Note Bank / Mightdealer
- Star Ocean: The Second Story (1998) – Opera Vectra
- Black/Matrix (1998) – Luca
- Dead or Alive 2 (1999) – Tina Armstrong
- SSX (2000) – Kaori Nishidake
- SSX Tricky (2001) – Kaori Nishidake
- Dead or Alive 3 (2001) – Tina Armstrong
- Dead or Alive Xtreme Beach Volleyball (2003) – Tina Armstrong
- Muv-Luv (2003) – Kei Ayamine
- Airforce Delta Strike (2004) - Collette, Francine
- Samurai Warriors (2004) – Kunoichi
- Dead or Alive 4 (2005) – Tina Armstrong
- Muv-Luv Alternative (2006) – Kei Ayamine
- Dead or Alive Xtreme 2 (2006) – Tina Armstrong
- Edelweiss (2006) – Ran Kamoike
- Uncharted: Drake's Fortune (2007) – Elena Fisher
- Uncharted 2: Among Thieves (2009) – Elena Fisher
- Dead or Alive: Paradise (2010) – Tina Armstrong
- Dead or Alive: Dimensions (2011) – Tina Armstrong
- Uncharted 3: Drake's Deception (2011) – Elena Fisher
- Dead or Alive 5 (2012) – Tina Armstrong
- Uncharted 4: A Thief's End (2016) – Elena Fisher
- Dead or Alive 6 (2019) – Tina Armstrong
- Atelier Ryza: Ever Darkness & the Secret Hideout (2019) – Mio Stout
- Dead or Alive Xtreme Venus Vacation (2022) – Tina Armstrong

=== Dubbing roles ===
==== Live-action ====
- Sarah Jessica Parker
  - Sex and the City – Carrie Bradshaw
  - Failure to Launch – Paula
  - Sex and the City (film) – Carrie Bradshaw
  - Did You Hear About the Morgans? – Meryl Morgan
  - Sex and the City 2 – Carrie Bradshaw
  - I Don't Know How She Does It – Kate Reddy
  - New Year's Eve – Kim Doyle
  - All Roads Lead to Rome – Maggie
  - And Just Like That... – Carrie Bradshaw
- The 4400 – April Skouris (Natasha Gregson Wagner)
- Alfie – Nikki (Sienna Miller)
- The L Word – Jenny Schecter (Mia Kirshner)
- Sherlock – Irene Adler (Lara Pulver)
- The Vampire Diaries – Isobel Flemming (Mia Kirshner)

==== Animation ====
- Star vs. the Forces of Evil – Mina Loveberry
