= Tamaki (Dead or Alive) =

Dead or Alive character

- Dead or Alive character
- Tamaki in Dead or Alive 6 (2020)
- First game: Dead or Alive Xtreme Venus Vacation (2018)
- Created by: Yasunori Sakuda
- Voiced by: Saori Ōnishi

In-universe information
- Nationality: Japanese
- Fighting style: Aikido

Tamaki (たまき) is a character in the Dead or Alive series by Koei Tecmo's Team Ninja. She debuted in the spin-off game Dead or Alive Xtreme Venus Vacation and is voiced by Saori Ōnishi.

== Conception and design ==
Tamaki's early design sketches showed her with shoulder-length light brown hair.

Shortly before the launch of Dead or Alive Xtreme Venus Vacation, Tamaki was created in late 2017 under the direction of Yasunori Sakuda from Team Ninja. The main intent behind Tamaki was creating a character with more straightforward sex appeal than the established characters from the main Dead or Alive franchise. As such, Tamaki was bolder in her approach to the player character compared to the characters available at the time. Part of Venus Vacation's gameplay involves collecting swimsuits every week through gacha banners. To tie into this, the team made Tamaki a fashion designer so that some of the in-game designs could be attributed to her.

Tamaki has green eyes, stands 169 centimetres (5 ft 6 1/2 in) tall, and has measurements of 84-54-87 cm (33-21-34 in). Her green hair is stylized into an asymmetrical haircut with ear-length hair besides her right ear and shoulder-length hair covering her left ear, she has a single pronounced red highlight on her long-hair side. Additional details include a mole under her right eye and an ahoge.

== Appearances ==
Tamaki debuted in Dead or Alive Xtreme Venus Vacation in April 2018 in the Japanese version and in June 2019 in the international version. She was the second post-launch additional character and 12th of the game's roster up to that point. Tamaki is an alluring 22-year-old fashion designer who previously worked as a model and her hobbies include bouldering, yoga, and bar hopping. She likes to playfully tease people and often oversteps boundaries. Despite this, she's shown to be a kind and a reliable "older sister" figure to the other girls in the Venus Island as evidenced by her in-game nickname "Tama-nee" (たま姉; lit. 'Tama-sis'). Tamaki's single evident flaw is her tendency to drink alcohol past her limits. Yasunori Sakuda has commented that her character being too "flawless" made it challenging to later find struggles for her to overcome. In all appearances, Tamaki is voiced by Saori Ōnishi. She has commented how Tamaki's charm stems from her blend of mature, sisterly vibes with glimpses of playfulness and cuteness.

After a request from Team Ninja producer Yohei Shimbori, Tamaki was added as a DLC character to Dead or Alive 6 in March 2020. She was added to the arcade version later that year and would return to the Last Round re-release as a base roster inclusion. Tamaki is the second character to make her fighting game debut from the Xtreme spin-off series after Lisa Hamilton. Shimbori commented that aikido was chosen as Tamaki’s martial art due to her graceful demeanor and Japanese nationality. Also, that he was personally overseeing her move list creation. In-game, Tamaki fights with a mix of strikes and holds, focusing on neutralizing the opponent’s attacks in an elegant and flexible way. On October 21, 2024, Tamaki was announced as the fourth character to be added to Venus Vacation Prism: Dead or Alive Xtreme. Based on pre-release impressions, Denfaminico Gamer editor President Takenaka called Tamaki a perfect match for Venus Vacation Prism's immersive dialogue system. Beyond the Dead or Alive series, Tamaki has made guest appearances in Destiny Child, Shinobi Master Senran Kagura: New Link, and Azur Lane.

== Critical reception ==
At the time of Tamaki's release, Dead or Alive Xtreme Venus Vacation was a Japan-exclusive video game. Therefore, initial impressions were mostly restricted to Asia. Nevertheless, she was well-received by members of the press and players alike. Wen Leshang of Chinese website 3DM described her as having a more "frank, positive, and bold personality" compared to other characters in Venus Vacation, further praising Ōnishi's voice acting for the character and emphasizing her sexually aggressive nature. Producer Yasunori Sakuda has called Tamaki’s release a turning point for Venus Vacation, as her positive reception combined with system changes made at the time, helped drive more attention to the game and secure its continued development.

Tamaki's inclusion in Dead or Alive 6 led to her introduction to a worldwide audience; however, her initial reception was mixed. Writing for Twinfinite, Giuseppe Nelva remarked how her pre-release promotion was awkward due to Koei Tecmo's avoidance to mention the Dead or Alive Xtreme series outside of Asia. Reviewing her teaser trailer, Dustin Bailey from PCGamesN called Tamaki "the game’s most relentlessly thirsty horndog". He added that unlike Lisa, who is a pro wrestler, Tamaki is a former swimsuit model and called her addition "pandering". 3DM's staff felt many of her attacks resembled those of Tekken character Asuka Kazama, noticing a heavy similarity between the two and accusing Koei Tecmo of plagiarism. They found this particularly embarrassing on Dead or Alive's part, as the franchise held a longstanding rivalry with Tekken. Matt Sainsbury from Digitally Downloaded was initially amused at Tamaki's resemblance to Kaede Takagaki from The Idolmaster series. After her release in Dead or Alive 6 however, he praised her fighting game debut noting that Tamaki added variety to the roster by bringing a new fighting style to the game and liked how her aikido moves were implemented.

Over time, Yasunori Sakuda mentions that Tamaki has become a popular character both in Japan and in the West. In Venus Vacation, character birthdays are celebrated through limited-time paid-only gacha banners. Tamaki's birthday banners often push the game to the top of Steam's top sellers in Japan.
