= Dead or Alive Xtreme Beach Volleyball =

2003 video game

- North American cover art featuring Tina (center), Hitomi (left), and Lisa (right)
- Developer: Team Ninja
- Publisher: Tecmo
- Producers: Tomonobu Itagaki; Mitsuo Osada
- Designers: Tomonobu Itagaki; Katsunori Ehara; Motohiro Shiga
- Programmer: Takeshi Sawatari
- Series: Dead or Alive Xtreme
- Platform: Xbox
- Release: January 22, 2003: NA: January 22, 2003; JP: January 23, 2003; EU: March 28, 2003
- Genres: Sports, casino
- Modes: Single-player, multiplayer

Dead or Alive Xtreme Beach Volleyball (Note: Japanese: DEAD OR ALIVE XTREME BEACH VOLLEYBALL(デッドオアアライブエクストリームビーチバレーボール), Hepburn: Deddo oa Araibu Ekusutorīmu Bīchi Barēbōru; also known as DOA Xtreme, DOAXBV or DOAX) is a 2003 beach volleyball video game developed by Team Ninja and published by Tecmo for the Xbox. It is a spin-off of the Dead or Alive series which otherwise consisted of fighting games. It also marked the first game in the series to have a Mature rating from the Entertainment Software Rating Board due to partial nudity.

The game is set immediately after the tournament in Dead or Alive 3 ended. Gameplay revolves around the women of the DOA series playing various mini-games in the many locations of Zack Island, a reclusive private resort on an island owned by Zack, the only male character from the series to appear anywhere in the game. This installment features no fighting engine, instead being much like a simulation game that encourages the player to establish relationships with the AI of characters, and eventually make a two-person team to compete in volleyball competitions. Currency earned from completing mini-games and gambling in the island's casino allows the player to purchase hundreds of different swimsuits to wear in the game.

Its sequel, Dead or Alive Xtreme 2, was released on November 13, 2006, exclusively for the Xbox 360. The next sequel, Dead or Alive Xtreme 3, was released on March 24, 2016, in Asian countries.

== Gameplay ==
In the main story mode, players select a woman to play as for the duration of their two-week period. Since the volleyball matches in the game are always two on two, the player automatically begins with a partner. Each day, players can select one activity in the morning, one in the afternoon, and one in the evening. While players do have an opportunity to simply relax during these time periods, they are generally used to either court new partners, or to challenge existing partnerships to a game of volleyball. Winning a match provides money which can be used to buy swimsuits and accessories, either for oneself, or as gifts to bestow upon the other women. Alternatively, players can also earn money through gambling at a casino located on the island.

Playing volleyball is done primarily through the use of two buttons, one designated for spiking and blocking, and the other for receiving or setting. As many of the actions happen automatically (e.g., jumping up to spike the ball), the game forces the player to focus on timing; a poorly timed press of a button results in a weak hit or a smash into the net. While it is possible to manually direct one's partner towards or away from the net, she will generally move to cover whichever area the player has left empty. The game is one of the few to make use of the analog sensitivity of the face buttons on the Xbox controller, with a softer touch allowing one to barely hit the ball over the net.

In addition to the core volleyball mechanic, the game features a relationship system between the various women on the island. Through gifts and skillful play, players can induce other characters to increase their esteem and positive feelings toward the character being played. A positive relationship with one's partner can translate into better performance during a volleyball match, while strong relationships with the other women leads to opportunities for new partners. Conversely, negative feelings from a partner can lead to missteps on the court, or can lead to gifts being thrown away unopened.

All money carries over between vacations, so that unspent "Zack bucks" can be used by a different character selected on the next play-through. Similarly, all swimsuits acquired by a given character remain with that character for all future play sessions. Since each character has access to a different set of swimsuits at the shop, the majority of suits for each character can only be acquired as gifts. Many of the costumes are very revealing and make the women appear almost nude in some instances. This, coupled with the suggestive poses the women present themselves in (which can be viewed and zoomed in on from almost any angle, as controlled by the player) led to the first Mature rating in the series' history.

While the game is entirely played with Japanese voiceovers, the story's CG cutscenes are played with English and Japanese voiceovers.

== Characters ==
There are eight playable characters, seven from previous Dead or Alive titles plus Lisa, who makes her debut in this title. Zack (voiced by Bin Shimada/Dennis Rodman) is not a playable character but appears in the game's beginning and ending cinematics, with small appearances throughout the game. His girlfriend, Niki (voiced by Yuka Koyama), appears only in cutscenes. As such, the volleyball players consist of:

- Ayane (voiced by Wakana Yamazaki) – Japanese ninja and rival (as well as half-sister) of Kasumi.
- Christie (voiced by Kotono Mitsuishi) – British assassin and automobile enthusiast.
- Helena (voiced by Yuka Koyama) – French opera singer fond of walking her dog.
- Hitomi (voiced by Yui Horie) – German/Japanese high-school student and aspiring chef.
- Kasumi (voiced by Houko Kuwashima) – Japanese runaway ninja who enjoys fortune-telling and origami.
- Leifang (voiced by Yumi Tōma) – Chinese college student with an interest in aromatherapy.
- Lisa (voiced by Maaya Sakamoto) – American stock broker and amateur surfer.
- Tina (voiced by Yūko Nagashima) – American wrestler and daughter of Bass Armstrong.

Each of the playable characters has her own likes and dislikes (documented in the game manual), which influence how likely she is to accept or be impressed by certain gifts. Favorable gifts include those based on her favorite food, favorite color, and hobbies. In order to suit the lighter, more playful nature of the game, the Dead or Alive characters' previous rivalries were reduced to just a general dislike in this title. As a result, even characters who would normally try to kill another (such as Ayane and Kasumi, or Christie and Helena) can become fast friends through a brief exchange of gifts.

== Plot ==
Zack gambles with his winnings from the Dead or Alive 3 tournament at a casino. In the process, he hits the jackpot, earning a ridiculously large sum of money. The money is used to purchase a private island, which he promptly turns into a resort named after himself ("Zack Island"). He then invites the women from the previous tournament (along with one newcomer—his girlfriend, Niki) to his island under the pretense that the next Dead or Alive tournament will be held there. The women arrive but soon discover it was all a hoax. They decide to make the best of the situation by spending two weeks vacationing on the island.

At the end of the two-week time period, the women depart, leaving only Zack and Niki on the island. Shortly thereafter, a volcano, previously thought to be inactive, spontaneously erupts, threatening to destroy the island. In the chaos, Niki escapes using Zack's jet pack. Zack survives the volcanic eruption, but the island itself is completely destroyed. While not part of the game itself, Zack's later Dead or Alive 4 ending shows the pair robbing an ancient tomb and escaping with a truck filled with gold, suggesting a possible financing source for a sequel. In the sequel, it is confirmed that this is indeed the source for financing "New Zack Island".

== Development and promotion ==
During Dead or Alive 2's development, the fan base requested Team Ninja to add a beach volleyball mini game as other fighting games such as Street Fighter and Tekken, had similar mini games. After Dead or Alive 3's release, the staff later decided to create the beach volleyball game as a standalone game. Tomonobu Itagaki cited that spending time on a beach resort was one of his main inspirations for the game and also cited Final Fantasy X-2 as another inspiration. He wanted to make a game that was special for the fans, and as a result, the game was designed exclusively for fans of the series, knowing that it wouldn't be understood by others who viewed making things for fans as negative. Itagaki rebuked that idea and fervently expressed that there wasn't anything wrong with that type of practice.

Making a traditional sports game was also a big point of contention since the fixed camera was how they made fighting games and the overall goal was to create a game that was easy to play and had cool movements. Only the female cast of the series are playable characters and development for the game was scheduled after Dead or Alive 3 due the amount of work required to develop it and the small amount of female characters in the series since having less than 8 playable characters was considered boring to have in a game. A new character named Lisa was added to bring the roster to a total of 8 playable characters.

Dead or Alive Xtreme Beach Volleyball was first showcased during E3 2002, and after its release during E3 2003 alongside Dead or Alive 3, Dead or Alive Online and Ninja Gaiden. During the game's E3 2003 promotion, its booth featured official beach models cosplaying as the characters of the series, playing beach volleyball, offering visitor photo ops with the beach models, along with holding Dead or Alive 3 competitive tag-team tournaments. The commotion caused by the event was such that the fire marshals shut the power down.

== Soundtrack ==
Song title	Artist
"Is This Love"	Bob Marley
"How Crazy Are You"	Meja
"Come On Over Baby (All I Want Is You)"	Christina Aguilera
"Move It Like This"	Baha Men
"Bitchism"	RajaNee
"Turn It Up"	RajaNee
"Do It"	Spice Girls
"I Want Your Girlfriend To Be My Girlfriend Too"	Reel Big Fish
"The Kids Don't Like It"	Reel Big Fish
"Jesse Hold On"	B*Witched
"If It Don't Fit"	B*Witched
"This Is It"	Innosense
"Brazilian Sugar"	George Duke
"Give Me A Reason"	Aswad
"Lovin' You"	Janet Kay
"Me Gusta"	Olga Tañón
"Pegaito"	Olga Tañón
"Sweet and Deadly"	Big Mountain
"Fe Real"	Big Mountain

== Reception ==
Reception

Aggregate scores
Aggregator	Score
GameRankings	74%
Metacritic	73/100

Review scores
Publication	Score
AllGame	2/5
Edge	8/10
Electronic Gaming Monthly	7.17/10
Eurogamer	3/10
Game Informer	7.5/10
GamePro	5/5
GameRevolution	B−
GameSpot	6/10
GameSpy	3/5
GameZone	9.2/10
IGN	9.2/10
Official Xbox Magazine (US)	8.4/10
Entertainment Weekly	B
Playboy	74%

Dead or Alive Xtreme Beach Volleyball reviewers were mostly positive, especially to the depth of the volleyball game, as well as with the high quality of the visuals and animation. Review scores ranged from poor to very high, resulting in the averaged ratings of 74% at GameRankings and 73/100 at Metacritic.

In its review, Edge focused on the game's unusual social, rather than adversarial, focus. Maxim gave the game a score of eight out of ten and stated that "The sharp graphics and advanced jiggle physics will no doubt prick the interest of lonely gamers, but surprisingly, the game's volleyball action is pretty solid. And that's the most important thing... right?" Entertainment Weekly gave it a B and said, "It's kinda difficult not to get caught up in this goofy title, as you use your v-ball winnings to buy shoes and skimpy clothes for your fellow beach bunnies." Playboy gave it a score of 74% and said, "As long as you know what you're in for, DOA: Xtreme Beach Volleyball can be a mildly entertaining collection of digital diversions with, at the very least, the best-looking virtual women to grace a video game."

At the first Spike Video Game Awards in 2003, Dead or Alive Xtreme Beach Volleyball won in the Best Animation category and was nominated in the Best Sports Game category. In 2006, GamesRadar ranked gravure scenes in the game to be one of the 100 greatest gaming moment in history. Conversely, Dead or Alive Xtreme Beach Volleyball won the "GameSpot's Best and Worst of 2003" in "Dubious Honors" category for Most Embarrassing Game.

Dead or Alive Xtreme Beach Volleyball would sell around 600,000 copies worldwide. In Japan, it sold over 122,000 copies during its release week including 73,000 copies on its launch day. By the end of the year, it had sold over 127,000 copies in the region according to Media Create sales data, while selling over 400,000 copies in North America and Europe combined. The game was re-issued in the Platinum Collection and Xbox Classics line of games in late 2003.

== Lawsuit ==
In January 2005, Tecmo sued Ninjahacker.net, a hobbyist game modding site dedicated to user-created modifications to the game and other Tecmo games. The site included custom skins that made the game's characters fully nude. Tecmo alleged that the site breached the Digital Millennium Copyright Act and other laws, and sought between $1,000 and $100,000 for every skin swapped on the site. Tecmo said the lawsuit was necessary to "uphold the integrity of our work", while a lawyer for the non-profit Electronic Frontier Foundation said the suit was "absurd" and that the site's offerings were "completely legal". Ultimately, the site was shut down and the defendants reached an undisclosed settlement with Tecmo.
