= Leifang =

Fictional character from Dead or Alive

- Dead or Alive character
- Leifang in Dead or Alive 5 (2012)
- First appearance: Dead or Alive (1996)
- Created by: Tomonobu Itagaki
- Designed by: Tomonobu Itagaki; Yutaka Saito (DOA5, DOA6); Yohei Shimbori (DOA6)
- Voiced by: English: Zinnia Su (DOAX2–DOAD) Cassandra Lee Morris (DOA5, DOA6); Japanese: Yumi Tōma
- Portrayed by: Ying Wang (film)

In-universe information
- Fighting style: Tai chi
- Origin: China
- Nationality: Chinese

Leifang (Japanese: レイファン, Hepburn: Reifan), originally stylized as Lei Fang, is a character in the Dead or Alive fighting game series by Koei Tecmo. Introduced in the original 1996 video game Dead or Alive, she has since appeared in every subsequent game as well as spinoff titles and media related to the franchise such as the Dead or Alive Xtreme series. Leifang was created by Tomonobu Itagaki, who snuck a rough version of her character into test builds of the game available to the public. She is a Tai Chi martial arts prodigy, competing in the franchise's tournaments to prove her superiority over fellow combatant Jann Lee after he had previously rescued her years prior to the first tournament.

One of the Dead or Alive series' more popular characters, she has received positive reception since her debut for her characterization in the series as an optimistic and strong character, as well as for the beauty of her design and variety of outfits. She additionally received praise as both a portrayal of female characters in fighting games and portrayal of Chinese cultural aspects within them, namely for her application of Tai Chi as a fighting style in light of the liberties fighting games take with martial arts, but also how her culture is represented through her hairstyles and dresses.

== Conception and creation ==
Leifang's outfits were designed to focus on fanservice but also provide a stylish look, and underwent several revisions. Meanwhile, her frequently changing hairstyles were meant to illustrate her innocence.

When developing the 1996 fighting video game Dead or Alive, lead developer Tomonobu Itagaki wanted to emphasize character expression, taking inspiration from the wrestling group nWo, and decided to include a woman that used kung fu early in development. Named Long Lihua in the game's design document, as development progressed her concept was scrapped, and the character Gen Fu was given a Tai Chi fighting style. However Itagaki wanted to include more Chinese martial arts into the title despite the development team being told not to include more than nine characters in the game. After a strong showing at the AOU Entertainment Expo in 1996 with a version of the game that only had three playable characters, Itagaki took a female character test model and applied the character Jann Lee's moveset to it. At events where modified builds of the game were made available for the public she proved quite popular, and in response Itagaki joked he had "tricked" the development team to include the "AOU-only character". As a result, the Tai Chi fighting style was given to her instead of Gen Fu, who was changed to use Xingyiquan instead.

Originally they had developed Leifang's fighting style to use grappling attacks to help fit into the "rock paper scissors" gameplay mechanic of the franchise. However, with development on the Sega Saturn port they incorporated a wider variety of attacks that used direct strikes. Itagaki's design philosophy was that instead of removing gameplay the key to strengthening a character was to add more, changing her from "a character who can't win without using holds to a character who becomes stronger by using holds." In terms of personality and appearance they wanted to emphasize Leifang as "cute" but also innocent, with Itagaki describing her as a good example of how well the modeling team for the series worked when they created a character with love. In the first game, her name was stylized as "Lei Fang", however this was corrected for all subsequent appearances.

=== Design ===
Standing 163 centimetres (5 ft 4 in) tall and with measurements of 87-55-86 cm (34-22-34 in), Leifang is a young Chinese woman with brown hair and eyes. Her hairstyle was intended to change frequently throughout the series to help portray her innocence, and she is often shown as having bangs and long hair, often stylized into queue-style pigtails dangling from the sides of her head. When developing the appearances of the female cast for the first Dead or Alive, the development team wanted to counter the then-perception that it was impossible to "create beautiful girls in 3D", with Itagaki aiming to create "Digital Venus" designs that would be popular on media character rankings. To this end particular emphasis was placed on the size and movement of the cast's breasts, in part due to the development team's own preference and what they perceived as a "breast boom" in Japan at the time, an increase in average bust sizes across the nation. The development team noted in this regard Leifang was one of the most popular characters at location tests for the game, surpassed only by Tina Armstrong.

In the first game, her outfit consisted of a black leather zipped up sleeveless top and matching shorts, while red fingerless gloves covered her hands. For Dead or Alive 2, her primary outfit was changed to a cheongsam dress with several alternatives, with the animations for them done by hand by character modeler Yasushi Nakamura as opposed to strictly motion capture to ensure they reacted properly to leg movement. While she has other varied alternate outfits throughout the series, such as a waitress uniform and swimsuits, the dresses remained her primary attire until Dead or Alive 6. There, it was changed to a yellow, black, and white tracksuit that exposes her midriff, resembling a similar outfit worn by martial artist and actor Bruce Lee. The design went through multiple rough sketches, intended to be a combination of her original outfit and Jan Lee's, combining the "cuteness and strength" they felt were her key characteristics.

== Appearances ==
Leifang is a Chinese woman introduced in the 1996 fighting game Dead or Alive by Koei Tecmo. Considered a prodigy in Tai Chi, a martial art she picked up to be able to compete with local boys around her, she is the daughter of a wealthy family, and earned a martial arts scholarship to Montana State University to teach the students. Several years prior to the first tournament, she one day encountered a boy being accosted by two thugs and intervened, but was taken by surprise after receiving a deep slash on her arm from one of the thugs. Another boy, Jang Lee, jumped in to defend her and quickly dispatched the two before walking away. Taken aback by his impressive strength, she increased her studies and enters the series' martial arts tournaments in order to defeat him. Through the course of the series she develops rivalries with other fighters as well, namely Tina and Hitomi.

In terms of gameplay, Leifang is considered a character that's viable for both new and experienced players, as she can chain attacks together at high speed, and is able to keep opponents in the air by "juggling" them with successive attacks. Due to her use of reversals which can counter enemy attacks and negate their damage, she has also been called a fighter more suited for "technical" gameplay, able to frustrate the opponent's ability to attack. These reversals rely on whether the incoming attack is considered a "high" or "low" attack, and when done Leifang will either intercept or sidestep the opponent's attack entirely, giving her a small window of time to able to deliver a counterattack. Alternatively, she can use several grabs to counter incoming attacks and deal exceptional damage to the opponent. However, these reversals are more difficult to implement.

Outside of the main series titles, she also appears in the first two Dead or Alive Xtreme spinoff games. While she was originally excluded from Dead or Alive Xtreme 3, she later appeared in Venus Vacation as the result of a player poll, though the development team noted she was particularly difficult to implement as they did not want to negatively impact her established crush towards Jang Lee while still having her show feelings towards the player's character. Outside the Dead or Alive franchise, Leifang also appears in the mobile game Destiny Child as part of a collaboration event between Tecmo and its developer Shift Up. In other media, Leifang appears in a minor role in the live-action film DOA: Dead or Alive, played by actress Ying Wang. She also appears in several stories in the gag comic series Dead or Alive 2 Comic Anthology by DNA Media Comics.

In Japanese, for all game appearances she is voiced by Yumi Tōma, who stated she appreciated how "light-hearted" the character was in comparison to some of her roles, though was initially worried about how her vocal presentation would turn out due to having to record the lines for the fighting games one by one. Meanwhile, in English starting with Dead or Alive Xtreme 2 she was voiced by Zinnia Su, with Cassandra Lee Morris later taking over the role with Dead or Alive 5.

== Promotion and reception ==
To promote the first game's release Tecmo published cosplay guides for the female cast, and for the Sega Saturn version they developed costumes based on the designs, hiring cosplayer Ikuko to portray Leifang and partnering with publisher Dengeki Strategy King to do comparisons between the model and her in-game counterpart. Several figures of Leifang were produced by companies such as Epoch, C-Works, Bandai, and Kotobukiya. Other merchandise has included dakimakura body pillow cases, swimsuit pin-up posters, playing cards, clothing, a Xbox controller, wall scrolls, and 3D mouse pads. Meanwhile, to promote the PSP release of Dead or Alive Paradise, gravure photos of Leifang alongside those of Helena and Christie were included as a pre-order bonus. In cross-promotions with other games, one of her outfits was included as a skin for the character Miichigo in the game Shinobi Master Senran Kagura, while digital cards of her were added to Sega's Samurai & Dragons game.

Leifang was well received upon debut. Paragon Publishing's Dreamcast Magazine described her as "a Chinese beauty in all senses of the word" and an "elegant fighter if there ever was one", but also a character that proved to be "a bit of a femme fatale". Vietnamese newspaper Thanh Niên meanwhile stated she stood out amongst the Dead or Alive cast due to her intelligence and character background, additionally praising how she always held "an optimistic and loving attitude towards life" while being portrayed in outfits that were both cute and complimented her physique. Hilary Goldstein of IGN described her as having "the most recognizable braided pigtails in all of video gaming", further stating that the website's staff enjoyed the character due to the fact she "dresses with some elegance" and the visually impressive nature of her attacks. Liyun Fei of 3DM meanwhile praised her as one of the more popular characters of the franchise, describing her as having a toned physique with a "bit of masculinity" that they felt was enjoyed by players and complimented well by her in-game outfits.

The staff of Kakuchopurei named her their favorite character in the Dead or Alive franchise, calling her an "underdog" that "adds pizzazz to the already-stellar cast". They further praised her outfit selection, stating it suited her "to a tee and they felt her appearance was superior to every younger female character amongst the game's cast. Additional praise was given for her character's story, which featured her as not only wanting to surpass Jan Lee but also illustrated her rivalry with characters like Hitomi, stating "You know you’ve got it made in the fighting game world when you’re front and center in the game’s story with strong rivals with different martial arts philosophies." Meanwhile, Zenji Nishikawa of Famitsu praised how Venus Vacation illustrated the "slight innocence that she boldly displays", while appreciating that the game allowed her a wider range of emotional expression than the mainline titles.

Author Nnedi Okorafor, in a thesis published for the Michigan State University's Department of Journalism, examined several video game characters and how they were portrayed through media such as gaming manuals, including Leifang. While they drew issue with how text for the character's backstory described her as a "vixen" solely because she was portrayed as "aggressive and 'beautiful'", Okorafor also praised how the character's backstory emphasized her placement in an overseas scholarship program. She felt details such as this helped Leifang to be portrayed as more than "just a female character whose breast can be set to bounce profusely", while also helping to add context to her character in a way that made more realistic in a real world sense rather than just a virtual one.

=== Regarding representation and stereotypes ===
Leifang's portrayal of Tai Chi and her cheongsam outfits have been praised for illustrating Chinese culture, with her black "Chinese Bondage" outfit considered a highlight of the series.

Leon Hunt in the book Kung Fu Cult Masters used Leifang as an example of how fighting games often lack authenticity in how they portray certain techniques, stating that while in cutscenes she used actual Tai Chi moves, her in-game fighting style instead demonstrated more on "the 'soft', flowing idea of an 'internal' style of Tai Chi". The staff of Japanese magazine CG-iCupid praised how well her fighting style fit Dead or Alive's gameplay, and was in their eyes an elegant departure from how many female fighting game characters use stronger attacks that did not suit their appearance. Instead they observed that "her gentle smile and victory speech give off a sense of ease that doesn't even suggest fatigue."

George Joerz of Chinese website Sina.com.cn however argued that Leifang's portrayal of Tai Chi was in line with its 14th century usage as "Practical Tai Chi", a subset of boxing as a martial art that focuses on internal damage instead of physical. While he noted some elements of her fighting style deviated from the actual martial art, he attributed this to the nature of fighting games. The website staff as a whole emphasized her kicking motions in this regard, though pointed out when coupled with her cheongsam dresses it only served to enhance her appeal due to the flexibility and physical exposure the outfits provided for such attacks. Joerz meanwhile further felt Tecmo's approach kept the fundamental concepts enough to illustrate the fighting style, adding that her character combines a difficult martial art "with the implicit feminine beauty of China."

While lecturer Fanny Lignon cited Leifang's attire as an example of gender stereotype reinforcement in fighting games, Christopher B. Patterson in the book Open World Empire cited her as an example of how the Dead or Alive series "depicted the 'cultural fragrance' of racial identities through a kawaii minimalism" via elements such as her cheongsam outfit and queue hairstyle, and that elements like sexualized attire tied into character backgrounds illustrated the characters' racial identities as an "explicit pleasure" for players to enjoy. The staff of Chinese website The Paper used her as an example how over-present the use of cultural identifiers such as martial arts and cheongsam outfits are in video game character design to help players "understand" that a character is Chinese are. They further questioned the necessity of such imagery in character design, feeling it played into stereotypes of how foreign cultures perceived China.
