= Venus Vacation Prism: Dead or Alive Xtreme =

2025 video game

- Main visual featuring Tamaki, Honoka, Nanami, Misaki, Elise, and Fiona (left to right)
- Developer: Team Ninja
- Publishers: JP/CN/SEA: Koei Tecmo; KR: Digital Touch
- Director: Yuri Terada
- Producer: Yasunori Sakuda
- Designers: Daishi Odashima; Igor Gerasimov
- Programmer: Shin Terai
- Artists: Kento Odakura; Asuna Ito; Rie Iijima
- Writers: Tsuyoshi Iuchi; Hiroto Iizawa
- Composers: Hikaru Yamada; Hiroaki Takahashi; Gota Masuoka
- Series: Dead or Alive Xtreme
- Engine: Katana Engine
- Platforms: PlayStation 4; PlayStation 5; Microsoft Windows
- Release: March 27, 2025
- Genre: Dating sim
- Mode: Single-player

Venus Vacation Prism: Dead or Alive Xtreme (Note: Stylized as Venus Vacation PRISM - DEAD OR ALIVE Xtreme -) is a dating sim video game developed by Team Ninja and published by Koei Tecmo. It was released on March 27, 2025, for PlayStation 4, PlayStation 5, and Microsoft Windows (via Steam and DMM Games). Similar to recent Dead or Alive Xtreme games, the game is only available in select Asian countries.

== Gameplay ==
Venus Vacation Prism is described as an "Immersive Romantic Adventure" in which the player takes the role of the manager (Note: Referred in-game as Owner (オーナー, Ōnā) in Japanese or Boss in the English localization) of the Venus Islands. The island is a tropical paradise where the player can interact with a diverse cast of six girls. Unlike previous Dead or Alive Xtreme games that featured dating sim aspects, in Venus Vacation Prism the dating aspect is central to the story which unfolds based on the choices made by the player with multiple outcomes. Photo mode can be accessed any time during character episodes. By sharing photos of the participants in-game, a popularity gauge increases and the Venus Festival gains momentum. Once popularity milestones are met, new outfits and hairstyles can be unlocked for the characters.

=== Characters ===
With the exception of Honoka who comes from the main Dead or Alive series, all characters were previously introduced in Dead or Alive Xtreme Venus Vacation.

- Misaki, a shy part-time staff who works alongside the Boss.
- Fiona, a naive princess who fell for the Boss at first sight.
- Elise, a beautiful yet strict supervisor sent to oversee activities at the Venus Islands.
- Tamaki, an alluring fashion designer who was a former model.
- Honoka, a laid-back schoolgirl with a secret.
- Nanami, a cool beauty visiting her childhood friend Misaki.

== Development ==
Ahead of Koei Tecmo's presentation at Tokyo Game Show 2024, the game was teased as New Venus Vacation Project. On September 27, 2024, Venus Vacation Prism was officially announced by producer Yasunori Sakuda accompanied by voice actress Minami Tsuda. During the presentation, a teaser trailer showing Misaki (voiced by Tsuda) was shown. Similar to recent Dead or Alive Xtreme games, it was confirmed that Venus Vacation Prism would release only in Asia. However, non-Japanese copies would have multilingual subtitles. The cast would feature six interactable characters with the remaining five being unveiled with weekly teaser trailers throughout October 2024.

On November 1, 2024, the game's first trailer was shown confirming the final cast and an initial release date of March 6, 2025. The game's pre-order bonuses, deluxe and collector's editions were also unveiled. In a series of interviews given by Sakuda, he revealed that development had started in January 2024 and that the team was composed of veterans from the Dead or Alive Xtreme Venus Vacation team as well as new members. They considered making Venus Vacation Prism a VR game but ultimately decided against it to deliver the highest visual fidelity possible. To achieve this, the game was developed using the latest Koei Tecmo's in-house engine called "Katana Engine". Finally, Venus Vacation Prism would not have character downloadable content since adding new storylines would be difficult within the established narrative shared by the existing cast.

On January 22, 2025, a second trailer debuted at Taipei Game Show 2025 showing alternative hairstyles and new minigames. The release date was pushed back 3 weeks to March 27, 2025 citing the addition of more episodes and quality improvements. Additional details were given for the deluxe edition DLC which would feature a collaboration episode with outfits designed by illustrator Yom. A third trailer was unveiled during a pre-release stream along with an official FAQ covering the technical differences between versions.

On December 3, 2025, the game launched on the Japanese cloud gaming platform TapFun.

== Reception ==
Reception

Aggregate scores
Aggregator	Score
Metacritic	71/100
OpenCritic	43%

Review scores
Publication	Score
Famitsu	32/40
M! Games	40/100
Push Square	6/10

OpenCritic reported 43% of critics recommending the game. Famitsu magazine awarded Venus Vacation Prism a score of 32/40 based on four reviews (6/9/8/9).

During its first week of sales in Japan, Venus Vacation Prism sold 9,568 physical units on PlayStation 5 and 2,812 on PlayStation 4, resulting in total physical sales of 12,380 units. On an interview with Famitsu, producer Yasunori Sakuda commented that the game was a financial success for the most part but couldn't comment on plans for further DLC or a sequel.
