= Nioh 3 =

2026 video game

- Developer: Team Ninja
- Publisher: Koei Tecmo
- Directors: Hayato Shibuya; Masaki Fujita
- Producers: Fumihiko Yasuda; Kohei Shibata
- Artists: Kensaku Tabuchi; Hirohisa Kaneko
- Writers: Saeyoung Yang; Makoto Shibata; Hiroko Takahashi; Takumi Oyama
- Composers: Yugo Kanno; Akihiro Manabe
- Engine: Katana Engine
- Platforms: PlayStation 5; Windows
- Release: February 6, 2026
- Genres: Action role-playing, hack and slash
- Modes: Single-player, multiplayer

Nioh 3 is an action role-playing video game developed by Team Ninja and published by Koei Tecmo. The third installment in the Nioh series, the game was released for PlayStation 5 and Windows on February 6, 2026. Although its predecessor Nioh 2 (2020) acted as a prequel to the original game, the third installment takes place after all of the events of the previous games.

== Gameplay ==
Nioh 3 is an action role-playing game played from a third-person perspective. In the game, the player controls Tokugawa Takechiyo, the grandchild of Tokugawa Ieyasu, who battles yokai and supernatural beings as they ascend to the role of Shogun. Similar to Nioh 2, players will be able to fully customize the protagonist's appearance.

The game features two distinct playstyles. The Samurai style plays similarly to previous Nioh games, with players having access to three weapon stances. Combat actions consume Ki, but players can use "Ki Pulse" to restore stamina after performing a combo or attack. As players deal damage to enemies, their "Arts Proficiency" gradually increases. Once the gauge is filled, players can unleash a devastating attack. The game also introduces a new parrying mechanic.

The game also introduces the Ninja playstyle, which is faster, evasion-focused, and excels at aerial attacks and ranged attacks. Weapon stances are replaced by three ninja tools that players can use in combat. Instead of Ki Pulse, the Ninja playstyle features "Mist," allowing players to create a clone of themselves to distract enemies, enabling a quick dash behind them for devastating damage. While the two playstyle do not share any equipment, players can freely switch between the two playstyles at will. As with its predecessors, players can also use guardian spirit transformations and skills, as well as Soul Cores, during combat.

Unlike its predecessors, Nioh 3 is less linear and features larger explorable spaces. Players can discover points of interest where they can find and complete side quests or optional combat challenges. In addition to the single-player mode, the game offers two online multiplayer modes: "Summon Visitor," which allows players to summon another player for assistance with difficult boss fights, and "Expedition," which enables players to explore the open fields together.

== Synopsis ==
=== Setting and characters ===
In 1622, Edo Castle stands on the brink of the protagonist Tokugawa Takechiyo's imminent appointment as the next Shogun. Takechiyo's younger brother, Tokugawa Kunimatsu, consumed by hatred toward his sibling's succession, falls into darkness. Empowered by a sinister force, he leads a horde of yokai in a fierce assault against Takechiyo. The era of peace suddenly turns into hell, and in dire straits, Takechiyo transcends time to change fate and save Japan through the mysterious power of his guardian spirit, Kusanagi.

Over the course of their journey, apart from the early Edo period, Takechiyo also ventures into the Sengoku, Heian and Bakumatsu eras, encountering both returning and new historical characters such as Himiko, Saito Fuku (who is now the protagonist's wet nurse and Onmyo magic mentor), Hattori Hanzo, Honda Tadakatsu, Minamoto no Yoshitsune, Yagyu Munenori and Takasugi Shinsaku. Takechiyo also comes into conflict with individuals such as Takeda Shingen, Minamoto no Yoritomo, Okita Sōji and Tokugawa Yoshinobu.

=== Main plot ===
Kunimatsu and yokai assault Edo Castle on the day Takechiyo is to be appointed Shogun. Using the corrupted Guardian Spirit Murakumo, Kunimatsu slays Saitō Fuku, Hattori Masanari, and Yagyu Munenori. Before Kunimatsu can kill Takechiyo, a bright light emanates from Kusanagi, transporting Takechiyo to 1572.

Takechiyo aids Tokugawa forces, helping Honda Tadakatsu repel Yamagata Masakage and Takeda Shingen's elite Crimson Army. Tadakatsu informs Takechiyo of the ongoing war and his intent to seek aid from Tokugawa Ieyasu. Takechiyo meets with Ieyasu, Hattori Hanzō, and Ii Naotora, who recognizes that Takechiyo has the power to cleanse the Crucible, domains where yokai hold the advantage. She informs them of how Crucinite, a dark substance scattered throughout time, can corrupt individuals and summon Crucibles. Takechiyo kills Baba Nobuharu at Futamata Castle, a transformed Masakage at the Battle of Mikatagahara, and defeats Shingen in a Crucible at Hamamatsu Castle and at Shingen's camp in Saigagake. Shortly after, Takechiyo vanishes in Kusanagi's light as Ieyasu realizes their identity and purpose.

Arriving in 1190, Takechiyo confronts the Great Tengu at Mount Kurama, with Minamoto no Yoshitsune assisting them. Yoshitsune tells Takechiyo of his conflict with his brother, Minamoto no Yoritomo, who called the Crucible upon Kyoto to defeat the yokai and become Shogun. Takechiyo helps Yoshitsune and Shizuka Gozen reach the Crucible but is ambushed by Yoritomo. Takechiyo defeats Yoritomo after Yoritomo sets the Spirit Tree ablaze. Before departing, Takechiyo plants the Spirit Tree's branches.

Next, Takechiyo travels to 247 and meets with Himiko, the queen of Yamatai. Alongside Himiko, Takechiyo fights Himiko's younger brother, Hiruko, who caused the Crucinite to appear. Having been rendered immortal by the Crucinite, Himiko seals Hiruko within the Eternal Rift. However, Hiruko's Guardian Spirit, Murakumo, traveled through time and eventually possessed Kunimatsu. Takechiyo returns to the day of the Shogun ceremony and defeats Kunimatsu. Hiruko fuses with Kunimatsu, as Kusanagi failed to destroy his Crucinite. Himiko suddenly appears, sending Takechiyo to the future to find the light of hope at the end of time.

In 1864, Takechiyo teams up with loyalist Takasugi Shinsaku, and Himiko (known as O-Ryo). They enter the Kyoto Imperial Palace Crucible and defeat Okita Soji of the Shinsengumi and Tokugawa Yoshinobu. The Spirit Tree, now fully grown, empowers Kusanagi and restores it to its full might. Takechiyo returns to the present, having learned what truly makes a Shogun. Despite Takechiyo's actions saving Munenori, Masanari, and Fuku, Edo Castle has warped into a horrific state. Takechiyo fights their way to Kunimatsu. They manage to defeat Kunimatsu, but Hiruko kills Himiko before vanishing with her.

In the aftermath, Takechiyo takes on the name Iemitsu, the third Shogun of the Edo Shogunate, with Japan now at peace; Himiko's spirit watches over Takechiyo.

== Development ==
Nioh 3 is developed by Koei Tecmo division Team Ninja, marking it as the first game in the series without involvement from fellow division Kou Shibusawa (though Shibusawa himself returns as executive producer) and publisher Sony Interactive Entertainment. Fumihiko Yasuda, director of the previous games, serves as general producer. Yasuda said that the team wanted to "create a new kind of action that would act as a major centerpiece" that marked the evolution of the Nioh gameplay formula. Popularity of ninjas in areas outside of Japan and the team's experience making Ninja Gaiden games also contributed to the decision. To further differentiate the gameplay between Samurai and Ninja, the team decided not to give Ninja Ki Pulse, despite it being one of the signature gameplay elements in past games. However, the game does not limit players to any one playstyle. Players can freely switch between the two playstyles as the team wanted to give them freedom in how they want to approach a challenge.

Nioh 3 was announced in June 2025 by Koei Tecmo. A time-limited demo for the game was released for the PlayStation 5. The game was released for PlayStation 5 and Windows on February 6, 2026. It will receive two downloadable contents, with the first DLC arriving by September 2026, and the second DLC by February 2027. New stories and weapons are confirmed to be included with each DLC. A playable demo for PS5 and PC from Jan 29, 2026 was announced along with a new trailer at The Game Awards 2025. The game uses Koei Tecmo's in-house Katana Engine, whose features, such as lighting, were improved for the development of the title.

The first downloadable content pack for the game, titled Hell Rising, was released on August 19, 2026.

== Reception ==
Reception

Aggregate scores
Aggregator	Score
Metacritic	(PC) 85/100 (PS5) 86/100
OpenCritic	94% recommend (Note: Based on 159 reviews)

Review scores
Publication	Score
Destructoid	9/10
Eurogamer	4/5
GameSpot	9/10
GamesRadar+	4.5/5
Hardcore Gamer	4/5
IGN	9/10
PC Gamer (US)	90/100
Push Square	8/10
RPGamer	3.5/5
RPGFan	81/100
Shacknews	8/10
TechRadar	4.5/5
Video Games Chronicle	4/5
VG247	4/5
VideoGamer.com	6/10

Nioh 3 received "generally favorable" reviews, according to review aggregator website Metacritic. Fellow review aggregator OpenCritic assessed that the game received "mighty" approval, being recommended by 94% critics.

=== Sales ===
The game reached 88,045 concurrent players on Steam during its launch week, doubling the record set by Nioh 2. By February 20, the game had sold more than 1 million copies, pushing the franchise's culmulative sales to 10 million.

=== Awards ===
Year	Award	Category	Result	Ref.
2026	Golden Joystick Awards	Console Game of the Year	Pending	
