= Katana Engine =

Video game engine by Koei Tecmo

- Original author: Future Tech Base (Koei Tecmo)
- Platform: Nintendo Switch; Nintendo Switch 2; PlayStation 4; PlayStation 5; Windows; Xbox One; Xbox Series X/S
- Type: Game engine
- License: Proprietary

Katana Engine (formerly known as Koei Tecmo Game Library; KTGL) is an in-house game engine developed by Koei Tecmo's Future Tech Base. It has been used for the development of several of the company's games, such as Wild Hearts and Rise of the Rōnin.

== Features ==
Screenshot of the Katana Engine material editor

Katana Engine supports modern 3D features such as automatic LOD generation and fluid simulation. It has a built-in world environment system that automatically changes lighting based on the time of day and latitude and longitude and supports various weather conditions such as rain, sun, and snow. The environment system can also be used to dictate the ambient sound. The engine uses percentage-closer soft shadows along with a proprietary reflection probe system for its shadows. It also includes a physically based material editor, as well as a procedural foliage placement system. Aside from physically based parameters, materials contain other parameters that affect its appearance; for example, a material can be set to accept a parameter that allows it to become dusty depending on the local environment. The engine also supports 9th generation systems and platforms like the Nintendo Switch 2, PlayStation 5, Windows, and Xbox Series X/S.

== History ==
Development of Katana Engine began in the early 2000s as a collection of individual production tools. Beginning in the 2010s, it started to develop into a full featured engine, and has since grown in usage internally. Koei Tecmo Games President, Hisashi Koinuma, stated that the advantages of developing an in-house game engine include attracting talented programmers and being able to understand the entire game development process more fully, such as understanding how hardware characteristics affect game development.

Director Ryota Matsushita stated that the engine is updated with new features for each new game that uses it. For example, 2D shading of 3D characters was improved for the release of Fate/Samurai Remnant.

Visualization of Katana Engine's LoD system

Yasunori Sakuda, producer of Venus Vacation Prism: Dead or Alive Xtreme, said that Katana Engine replaced the Yawaraka Engine used in previous games in the series due to features such as its superior environment system; the developers were not able to implement rain in Dead or Alive Xtreme Venus Vacation due to constraints of the Yawaraka Engine.

For the development of Nioh 3, the a new global illumination system was created called OBORO, and the LoD system was upgraded to use a meshlet-based stepless LoD, meaning levels of detail changes much more gradually as objects become more distant.

== Games ==
This list only includes notable games that have been confirmed to use Katana Engine.

| Title | Release date | Ref. |
|---|---|---|
| Atelier Yumia: The Alchemist of Memories & the Envisioned Land | March 2, 2025 | |
| Dead or Alive 6 | March 1, 2019 | |
| Dynasty Warriors 9 | February 8, 2018 | |
| Dynasty Warriors: Origins | January 17, 2025 | |
| Fatal Frame II: Crimson Butterfly Remake | March 12, 2026 | |
| Fate/Samurai Remnant | September 28, 2023 | |
| Fire Emblem Warriors: Three Hopes | July 24, 2022 | |
| Hyrule Warriors: Age of Imprisonment | November 6, 2025 | |
| Pokémon Pokopia | March 5, 2026 | |
| Nioh 3 | February 6, 2026 | |
| Rise of the Rōnin | March 22, 2024 | |
| Samurai Warriors 5 | June 24, 2021 | |
| Venus Vacation Prism: Dead or Alive Xtreme | March 27, 2025 | |
| Wild Hearts | February 17, 2023 | |
| Wo Long: Fallen Dynasty | March 3, 2023 | |

== See also ==
- Category:Katana Engine games
