= Dead or Alive 3 =

2001 video game

- North American cover art featuring Jann Lee (front) and Hitomi (background)
- Developer: Team Ninja
- Publishers: WW: Tecmo; EU: Microsoft Game Studios
- Directors: Tomonobu Itagaki; Hiroaki Matsui
- Producers: Tomonobu Itagaki; Yasushi Maeda
- Designer: Katsunori Ehara
- Programmers: Mitsuo Osada; Takeshi Sawatari
- Writer: Hiroaki Matsui
- Composers: Makoto Hosoi; Takashi Inamori; Ryo Koike
- Series: Dead or Alive
- Platform: Xbox
- Release: November 15, 2001: NA: November 15, 2001; JP: February 22, 2002; EU: March 14, 2002
- Genre: Fighting
- Modes: Single-player, multiplayer

Dead or Alive 3 (Note: Japanese: DEAD OR ALIVE(デッドオアアライブ) 3, Hepburn: Deddo oa Araibu Surī; abbreviated as DOA3) is a 2001 fighting game developed by Team Ninja and published by Tecmo for the Xbox console as one of its launch titles. It is the third main entry in the Dead or Alive fighting series following Dead or Alive 2 (1999). Dead or Alive 3 improved upon the gameplay and graphics in beautiful detail compared to that of its predecessors. The game's story focuses on DOATEC's attempt to create the ultimate human weapon through their Omega Project by capturing the Mugen Tenshin Ninja Clan's Hajin Mon leader, Genra, and transforming him into an evil superhuman called Omega. The ninjas enter the third Dead or Alive tournament to defeat Omega.

Dead or Alive 3 was critically acclaimed and a commercial success upon release, selling over 1 million units in the first five months after its release, and went on to sell over 2 million units worldwide, becoming the best-selling game in the franchise and one of the top 10 best-selling Xbox games. The game won several awards and was nominated for many others. The European and Japanese versions were released months later, featuring additional content and gameplay updates that are not featured in the North American version.

Dead or Alive 3 later became backwards compatible on Xbox 360 in 2005. In 2021, all versions of Dead or Alive 3 were made available to download from Xbox Live worldwide, and were later made backward compatible on Xbox One and Xbox Series X/S. Dead or Alive 3 was followed by Dead or Alive Ultimate in 2004 and then its sequel Dead or Alive 4 in 2005.

== Gameplay ==
A Tag Throw by Christie and Helena Douglas against Gen Fu

The basic gameplay controls remain essentially unchanged from Dead or Alive 2. Some tweaks have been added to the game system in the form of increased counter periods, unrestricted 3D-axis movement, and less emphasis on juggling combos. All these gameplay enhancements make the game suitable for beginners, and makes the artificial intelligence a bit more forgiving. Move properties for character attacks are updated. The game incorporated less damage percentiles in counter hold maneuvers, making players rely more on blows and throws to defeat opponents. Fighters who are caught in hazardous falls can now be knocked out if they have very low health.

The game adds a new feature in its Sparring mode called "Exercise", an automatic command tutorial that teaches players how to perform attacks. One Command is displayed onscreen at a time during gameplay and changes after being successfully performed, therefore players can easily practice learning character moves while commands are displayed at the same time.

The Tag team system, introduced in the previous game, was also updated. Tag Battle matches are made available to select in the game's Time Attack and Survival modes. A new mechanic called "Attack Change" was added, allowing the character tagging in to attack while switching in. The Tag Throws command was made a bit easier to activate.

Compared to previous entries in the series, the game takes advantage of the Xbox system's power to push the range of the graphics and environment sizes farther than the Dead or Alive 2 games. The game has less unlockable content compared to DOA2: Hardcore. The game also utilizes the Xbox controller's pressure sensitive analog face buttons to allow shortcuts in performing certain moves, making the controls lenient to allow players new to the series to adapt to the gameplay. Players have the option to turn the analog buttons on or off in the game's settings.

=== European and Japanese versions ===
Months after the initial North American release of the game, the European and Japanese versions featured many gameplay changes, with more than a dozen new attacks for characters, an improved and more challenging artificial intelligence, tweaked move properties for attacks, more unlockable content, much better sidestepping movements that allows players to dodge most attacks, and the controller's analog sticks can be used when the analog button setting is turned off.

== Characters ==
Dead or Alive 3 features a total of 18 fighters, including 17 playable characters and the boss character Omega. The characters returning from the previous installments are Ayane, Bass Armstrong, Bayman, Ein (unlockable), Gen Fu, Helena Douglas, Jann Lee, Kasumi, Leifang, Leon, Ryu Hayabusa, Tina Armstrong, and Zack. Playable newcomers are Chinese drunken fighter Brad Wong, British assassin Christie, Japanese ninja Hayate (appeared in the roster of the previous title as "Ein"), and German-Japanese karateka Hitomi.

=== New ===
- Brad Wong, a Chinese drunken fighter whose teacher, Chen, sends him on a journey to search for the mysterious wine called "Genra". After three years of wandering, he finds himself in the Dead or Alive tournament.
- Christie, a British assassin and she-quan practitioner hired by Victor Donovan, leader of DOATEC's anti-Douglas faction. She enters the tournament in order to keep an eye on Helena.
- Hayate, a Japanese ninja and the 18th leader of the Mugen Tenshin Ninja Clan, who appeared in the previous game as "Ein". He enters the tournament again in order to defeat Omega, the superhuman created as a puppet of DOATEC's Project Omega.
- Hitomi, a German-Japanese karateka who always wanted to fight in the Dead or Alive tournament. After getting permission from her father, she joins the tournament in order to test her formidable skills against the real world.
- Omega ^{a}, the evil superhuman of DOATEC's Project Omega who used to be Genra, the leader of the Mugen Tenshin's Hajin Mon sect and Ayane's foster-father.

=== Returning ===
- Ayane
- Bass Armstrong
- Bayman
- Ein ^{b} ^{c}
- Gen Fu
- Helena Douglas
- Jann Lee
- Kasumi
- Leifang
- Leon
- Ryu Hayabusa
- Tina Armstrong
- Zack

^a Unplayable boss
^b Unlockable character
^c Unplayable in Story Mode

== Plot ==
The hero ninja, Ryu Hayabusa, succeeded in putting a stop to the evil doings of Tengu during the last tournament, but it was too late to stop him from triggering a massive worldwide collapse. A dense cloud covered the entire planet in a shroud of darkness and fear. DOATEC has gone astray, turning into the hunting grounds for power-hungry scam artists.

This is when DOATEC's development department (a fortress for state-of-the-art military technology) witnesses the success of a genius. Following Project Alpha and Project Epsilon, the ever ambitious scientist, Dr. Victor Donovan completes the Omega Project, producing a new superhuman: Genra. The man, who was once leader of the Hajin Mon ninjas of the Mugen Tenshin Ninja Clan, is no longer human, but a force of singular and unprecedented capabilities known as Omega. To test the subject Omega's skills, DOATEC announced the third Dead or Alive World Combat Championship.

The ninjas Hayate, Ayane, and Ryu Hayabusa enter the third tournament to defeat Genra. Bayman, the assassin who was once hired by Victor Donovan to kill Fame Douglas during the first tournament, enters the third tournament to get revenge on Donovan after he sent a mysterious sniper to kill him. Bayman easily quashed the sniper, but the feeble attempt on his life left Bayman in anger and in retaliation against Donovan. Helena Douglas, daughter of Fame Douglas was captured by the anti-Douglas faction of DOATEC led by Donovan. Whether Helena likes it or not, she is dragged into the intertwined conspiracies within the huge DOATEC organization. Donovan challenges Helena to win the third tournament. If she wins, she will regain her freedom and learn the truth behind DOATEC. To prevent Helena from winning, Donovan hires a British assassin named Christie to keep an eye on her, and kill her if necessary.

As the tournament is underway, Kasumi, who is hunted and forced to defend herself from multiple attempts on her life by highly skilled ninja assassins, due to her status as a runaway ninja, desires to see her brother Hayate again. She cross paths with her half-sister Ayane, who states that she can see Hayate if she wants as she's more focused on defeating Genra rather than hunting her. Kasumi meets with Hayate, who's torn between the ninja code and his love for his sister. He decides to save Kasumi by pretending he didn't meet with her. Afterwards, an argument is made between the ninjas on who should defeat Genra. Hayabusa is prepared to bring down Genra, but Hayate states to Hayabusa that he does not know Genra like he does since he and Genra are from the same clan. Hayate also states that since he is the new leader of the Mugen Tenshin, he should defeat Genra instead. Later, both Ayane and Hayate argue on who should defeat Genra. Ayane, as a Hajin Mon ninja and Genra's foster-daughter, feels that fate commands her to put Genra out of his misery and that it is her duty to defeat him. Eventually, Ayane wins the third Dead or Alive tournament and kills Genra. Saddened by his death, Ayane cremates his body and keeps his tokkosho sword.

== Development ==
Dead or Alive 3 promo booth at the Tokyo Game Show 2001

After the success of Dead or Alive 2, Tecmo was working on continuing the series when Microsoft approached them, offering a deal to develop the next Dead or Alive as an exclusive title for the recently announced Xbox. The Xbox was still in development, and Microsoft was in need of exclusive, high-profile games to show off the technical capability of their product. This deal also fit in with series creator Tomonobu Itagaki's design philosophy of always targeting the most powerful console available for the development of Dead or Alive games.

Itagaki accepted the offer as he noted how the specs of Xbox were much higher and more powerful than other systems such as the PlayStation 2 and Dreamcast. Itagaki and Team Ninja noted how developing solely for one home console was easier and how the Xbox's development environment was very convenient like the Dreamcast's, and was much more convenient than the PlayStation 2's.

In addition to the original soundtrack in the game, three songs by the American rock band, Aerosmith, also appear in Dead or Alive 3 and can also be played in the game's settings menu. "Nine Lives" was the opening theme, and "Home Tonight" was played over the credits. "Amazing" was not used in the actual game, but was a music sample under the settings menu.

== Release ==
In May and June of 2001, the release of Dead or Alive 3 was announced during E3 and the Tokyo Game Show. The game was first released in North America, in order to coincide with the North American Xbox launch. An updated version of Dead or Alive 3 was then released for the Japanese and European Xbox launches several months later. The European and Japanese versions of Dead or Alive 3 feature more content such as extra costumes, new attacks for characters, gameplay tweaks, and a new cinematic introduction for the game. Because of its early release, the North American version does not feature any of the above.

In January 2002, Microsoft released the Xbox Exhibition Volume 1 disc in the US containing booster content for Dead or Alive 3, and in May 2002, the US Official Xbox Magazine provided a 'Booster Disc' for Dead or Alive 3. Both releases included the new cinematic introduction and all of the extra costumes released on the EU and JP versions of the game, but they did not however contain the extra fighting moves or general game balancing tweaks that the other versions brought. Both booster releases also contained a playable demo for those who didn't have the game. Only Time Attack mode is playable in the demo and only Hitomi, Zack, Tina, Bass, Jann Lee, Leifang, Christie, and Helena are playable while the other game modes, characters, and game settings are locked down. The booster content continued to be provided with the Official Xbox Magazine demo disc from June 2002 to September 2002; each disc featured the same content but gave magazine buyers multiple times to acquire it. The Platinum Hits, Platinum Collection, and Xbox Classics editions of the game were released in 2003.

=== Merchandise ===
A Dead or Alive 3 Arcade Stick manufactured by Hori

An Arcade Stick for Dead or Alive 3 made by Japanese video game peripheral manufacturer, Hori, was released exclusively for the Xbox on February 22, 2002, in order to coincide with the Dead or Alive 3 and Xbox launch in Japan.

A soundtrack CD for the game, titled Dead or Alive 3 Original Sound Trax (KWCD-1006), was released by Wake Up in 2002. A guide book titled Dead or Alive 3: Prima's Official Strategy Guide by Prima Games was published in North America on November 5, 2001. Three more guide books were published in Japan in early 2002: Dead or Alive 3 Guide Book (デッド オア アライブ3 ガイドブック) by Famitsu / Enterbrain, Dead or Alive 3 Kōshiki Kōryaku Guide (デッド オア アライブ3 公式攻略ガイド) by Kodansha, and Dead or Alive 3 Perfect Guide (デッド オア アライブ3 パーフェクトガイド) by SoftBank.

=== Backwards compatibility and digital release ===
Dead or Alive 3 later became backwards compatible on the Xbox 360. On November 10, 2021, Dead or Alive 3 became available to download on Xbox Live worldwide. As of November 15, 2021, Dead or Alive 3 is now backward compatible on the Xbox One and Xbox Series X/S.

The European and Japanese versions of Dead or Alive 3, both which feature more content, can be downloaded from Xbox Live on American Xbox platforms by purchasing Dead or Alive 3 for $14.99 in the Xbox Store first, then changing the region in the Xbox settings to either United Kingdom or Japan, and restarting the console before downloading. The console can be switched back to the American region after the download is complete.

== Reception ==
Reception

Aggregate scores
Aggregator	Score
GameRankings	86.19%
Metacritic	87/100

Review scores
Publication	Score
1Up.com	B−
AllGame	3.5/5
Edge	7/10
Electronic Gaming Monthly	8/10
Eurogamer	6/10
Famitsu	10/10, 9/10, 9/10, 9/10
Game Informer	9.25/10
GamePro	5/5
GameRevolution	B
GameSpot	7.9/10
GameSpy	4/5
GameZone	8.5/10
IGN	9.4/10
Next Generation	5/5
Official Xbox Magazine (US)	9.5/10
The Cincinnati Enquirer	4/5
Maxim	4/5

Awards
Publication	Award
Academy of Interactive Arts & Sciences (2002)	Console Fighting Game of the Year
National Academy of Video Game Trade Reviewers (NAVGTR)	Outstanding Fighting Game Sequel
The Electric Playground	Best Console Fighting Game
IGN	Best Fighting Game of 2001; Xbox: Best Graphics of 2001
GameSpot	Best Graphics, Technical

Upon its release, Dead or Alive 3 was "critically acclaimed", receiving generally favorable reviews with the scores of 86.19% and 87/100, according to the review aggregation websites GameRankings and Metacritic. In Japan, Famitsu gave it a high score of 37 out of 40.

Anthony Chau of IGN gave Dead or Alive 3 a 9.4 out of 10, stating that it "represents the new standard of excellence that only the Xbox can deliver", praising the game for its great attention to detail and its vast improvements on its predecessor. Chau also stated how Team Ninja "didn't stop setting standards in just the graphics as they combined this level of visual quality with subtle but innovative 3D gameplay mechanics incorporating a new standard of strategy never experienced in a 3D fighting game before". GameSpot's Greg Kasavin also praised the graphics, saying the game "looks absolutely stunning" and was the "best-looking home fighting game ever released", but opined that "once you get past its graphics, you'll find that Dead or Alive 3 doesn't offer much of anything that hasn't been done in other 3D fighting games". The staff of 1Up.com agreed with this sentiment saying: "There is very little here that we would describe as new, original or subtle; where Soul Calibur painted a fighting masterpiece, DOA3 portrays something more akin to the latest Bruckheimer production. Check it out, but expect a few pangs of disappointment". NextGen disagreed with Gamespot and 1Up.com and gave the game 5 out of 5 stars, stating that the game was "Quite possibly the best 3D fighting game ever made, both in graphics and gameplay" and "It's fast, it's deep, and it's so beautiful it almost hurts". ActionTrip rated it 94 out of 100, stating how Dead or Alive 3 truly excels in its variety of fighting styles and different moves and that "any self-respecting beat-em-up fan should own this game". John Valor of Cloudchaser praised Dead or Alive 3's full utilization of the Xbox controller with such ease, calling it "an incredible achievement". The Electric Playground called Dead or Alive 3 "The true King of Fighters", and "a perfect showcase for what kind of games the Xbox is able to deliver". Justin Leeper of Game Informer called it "a masterpiece in both form and function". GameShark stated "Is Dead or Alive 3 a great game? Yes. Is it the best fighter ever? No, but hey, it's light years better than Tekken Tag and a hell of a lot more fun than Virtua Fighter 3." Newsweek's N'Gai Croal called Dead or Alive 3 the future of fighting games. Official Xbox Magazine gave the game a 9.5 out of 10, calling it a "Glorious looking, fast moving fighter with all the right moves" and "The most technologically advanced fighting game ever made".

=== Awards ===
Dead or Alive 3 was awarded "Console Fighting Game of the Year" by the Academy of Interactive Arts & Sciences; it was also a nominee for the "Outstanding Achievement in Animation" award, which ultimately went to Oddworld: Munch's Oddysee. The game was also awarded "Outstanding Fighting Game Sequel" and nominated for "Outstanding Animation in a Game Engine" by the inaugural National Academy of Video Game Trade Reviewers (NAVGTR). The game was also awarded "Best Console Fighting Game" and was nominated for "Best Graphics in a Console Game", "Best Multiplayer Console Game", and "Xbox Game of the Year" by The Electric Playground. IGN awarded it "Best Fighting Game of 2001" in their Best of 2001 Awards, "Best Xbox Graphics of 2001" in the IGN Reader's Choice Awards", and the game was a runner-up for IGN's "Best Xbox Game of 2001". The game won GameSpot's annual "Best Graphics, Technical" prize among console games, but also received a nomination in the "Most Disappointing Game" category, and was a runner-up for the "Best Xbox Game" category. The game was also nominated for "Xbox Game of the Year" at the Golden Joystick Awards.

=== Sales ===
Dead or Alive 3 became the best-selling installment in the franchise, one of the top 10 best-selling Xbox games, and the best-selling Xbox fighting game with over 2 million units sold worldwide. In 2002, Tecmo announced the game had reached sales of over 1 million units worldwide in the first five months after its release. The game topped the Japanese charts on release, coming in number 1 with over 84,000 units sold during Week 8 in 2002, and would sell over 112,000 units during the same year in Japan alone. The game sold over 1.5 million units by early 2003, and went on to sell over 2 million units. By July 2006, it had sold over 950,000 units and earned over $36 million in the U.S. alone. NextGen ranked it as the 59th highest-selling game launched for the PlayStation 2, Xbox or GameCube between January 2000 and July 2006 in that country. Combined sales of Dead or Alive fighting games released in the 2000s reached over 1.3 million units in the U.S. by July 2006. The game became the third best-selling launch title next to Microsoft's Halo: Combat Evolved and Project Gotham Racing and the first third-party Xbox game to garner Platinum status. Dead or Alive 3 was re-issued in the Platinum Hits, Platinum Collection, and Xbox Classics line of games in 2003.

== Legacy ==
Dead or Alive 3 competitive event at the Xbox Championship Vol. 4

Dead or Alive 3 was a "killer app", notable for being one of the essential titles in helping build the Xbox brand. During several Xbox showcases, Dead or Alive 3 demonstrated how powerful the Xbox was, what the platform was capable of delivering, was the first fighting game for Xbox, and the only fighting game as a launch title for the platform. The fighting game genre, being one of the core genres of gaming, gave the impression that home console launches wouldn't be very successful if they didn't have a great fighting game to launch with, and Dead or Alive 3 became one of the key games in the Xbox's early success. GamesRadar+ included Dead or Alive 3 among the Xbox games "that shaped the generation", and later included it in their list of the "best original Xbox games".

In 2002, Dead or Alive 3 became the first fighting game to receive an award from the National Academy of Video Game Trade Reviewers (NAVGTR) during the academy's inaugural award show, and the first fighting game to be included in the Xbox Championship tournaments. Dead or Alive 3's popularity led to the creation of the largest and oldest Dead or Alive community website, Free Step Dodge, while the sidestepping mechanic in the European and Japanese versions of the game inspired the naming of the community site.

In 2004, IGN's Hilary Goldstein declared Dead or Alive 3 as the best Xbox Platinum Hit. In 2008, CinemaBlend ranked the game as the 8th best fighting game of all time. In 2011, Complex ranked the game as the 15th best fighting game of all time. In 2016, Twinfinite ranked it 11th best fighting game of all time. In 2022, Game Rant ranked it the "Best Xbox Fighting Game To Hold Up Well".
