= Dead or Alive Xtreme =

- Dead or Alive Xtreme Beach Volleyball logo
- Genres: Beach volleyball game; Minigame compilation; Dating sim; Sports management
- Developer: Team Ninja
- Publishers: Tecmo, Koei Tecmo
- Creator: Tomonobu Itagaki
- Platforms: Xbox, Xbox 360, iOS, PlayStation Portable, PlayStation 4, PlayStation Vita, Windows, Nintendo Switch, PlayStation 5
- First release: Dead or Alive Xtreme Beach Volleyball; January 22, 2003
- Latest release: Venus Vacation Prism: Dead or Alive Xtreme; March 27, 2025
- Parent series: Dead or Alive

Dead or Alive Xtreme, (Note: Japanese: DEAD OR ALIVE XTREME(デッドオアアライブエクストリーム), Hepburn: Deddo oa Araibu Ekusutorīmu) also known as DOA Xtreme or DOAX, is a beach volleyball video game series created by Team Ninja and published by Tecmo (and later Koei Tecmo). It is a spin-off of the Dead or Alive fighting game series and features its female characters spending a vacation in a tropical island. Through summer-themed minigames, players can collect gifts that can be given to the characters to unlock outfits, story episodes, and exclusive cutscenes.

== Development ==
Release timeline
2003	Dead or Alive Xtreme Beach Volleyball
2004–2005
2006	Dead or Alive Xtreme 2
2006	DOA Paradise♪
2007–2008
2009	Girls of DOA BlackJack
2010	Dead or Alive Paradise
2011–2015
2016	Dead or Alive Xtreme 3 Fortune & Venus
2017	Dead or Alive Xtreme Venus Vacation
2017	Dead or Alive Xtreme Sense
2018
2019	Dead or Alive Xtreme 3 Scarlet
2020–2024
2025	Venus Vacation Prism: Dead or Alive Xtreme

During the development of Dead or Alive 2, director Tomonobu Itagaki heard that fans wanted mini games on Dead or Alive games akin to other fighting games of the era. Instead of adding them to the main series however, he developed the concept into a standalone minigame compilation with emphasis on beach volleyball. Itagaki said the key word to describe the spin-off, Dead or Alive Xtreme Beach Volleyball, was "paradise" and that the game took into account Japanese sensitivities for its portrayal of beauty, sex-appeal, and humor.

In Dead or Alive Xtreme 2, Itagaki sought to refine and expand on gameplay elements of the first game. With Dead or Alive Xtreme starting to become its own series, Team Ninja treated the development of the sequel as serious as the jump from Dead or Alive to Dead or Alive 2. In addition, to help expand the game's global appeal Xtreme 2 added English voiceovers. After Itagaki's departure, Tecmo Koei put together a one-off team called Project Venus to develop Dead or Alive Paradise, a modified port of Xtreme 2 to the PlayStation Portable. Director Yoshinori Ueda said that the new staff wanted to maintain the level of quality the series was known for while also being more open to player feedback.

Dead or Alive Xtreme 3 was teased at the "Dead or Alive Festival" event in late 2015. Later, official Koei Tecmo social media confirmed the game's existence and its exclusivity to Japanese and Asian markets. Producer Yosuke Hayashi said that this was due to the main Dead or Alive series being overwhelmingly more popular internationally with Xtreme fans being more numerous in Japan. Innovations over previous games in the series include a new graphics engine with an improved breast physics engine, iterated from the one used in Dead or Alive 5. A debate arose over Koei Tecmo's decision to skip Western markets, with claims of self-censorship or the move being a publicity stunt. Factors that might have contributed to the decision include: changes in the Western gaming landscape, a change in marketing approach after Koei took over publishing of the series, cultural differences, and diminishing sales over time. Post-release, a PlayStation VR DLC was added in early 2017 and an updated re-release followed in 2019.

After the release of Xtreme 3, Hayashi noticed that one of the trailers became the most watched video on Koei Tecmo's YouTube channel. Despite reaching 1.6 million views, this did not translate into initial sales of that magnitude. To bring the series to that audience that could not play but was nevertheless interested, Dead or Alive Xtreme Venus Vacation was conceived as a free-to-play game for PC. Venus Vacation switched genres to a sports management game to accommodate people used to mobile and browser games. It also aimed to introduce characters that were not fighters and wouldn't fit the mold of a traditional Dead or Alive game. For this reason, all characters added post-release (with the exception of Leifang and Tina) have been original to Venus Vacation. Director Yasunori Sakuda commented that it was difficult to reintroduce existing characters to the spin-off due to their established relationships in the mainline games. Conversely, it was much easier for him to create characters from scratch whose stories had a deeper focus with the player.

Seven years after Venus Vacation started operation, (now producer) Yasunori Sakuda determined that the live service game model had made it difficult for new players to jump in. Also, that the engine was becoming graphically dated after nearly a decade of use. To provide players a starting point to Venus Vacation and employ newer technology, the spin-off dating sim Venus Vacation Prism: Dead or Alive Xtreme was developed as a standalone game for PlayStation 5, PlayStation 4, and PC.

== Games ==
=== Main series ===
Game	Details
Dead or Alive Xtreme Beach Volleyball Original release dates: NA: January 22, 2003; JP: January 23, 2003; EU: March 28, 2003	Release years by system: 2003 – Xbox
Dead or Alive Xtreme Beach Volleyball Original release dates: NA: January 22, 2003; JP: January 23, 2003; EU: March 28, 2003	Notes: Beach volleyball game featuring all female Dead or Alive characters up until Dead or Alive 3.; Only game in the series to feature local multiplayer.
Dead or Alive Xtreme 2 Original release dates: NA: November 13, 2006; JP: November 22, 2006; EU: December 8, 2006	Release years by system: 2006 – Xbox 360
Dead or Alive Xtreme 2 Original release dates: NA: November 13, 2006; JP: November 22, 2006; EU: December 8, 2006	Notes: Beach volleyball game featuring all female Dead or Alive characters up until Dead or Alive 4.; First game in the series to feature online multiplayer and the last game to offer real-time direct multiplayer.
Dead or Alive Xtreme 3 Original release date: AS: March 24, 2016	Release years by system: 2016 – PlayStation 4, PlayStation Vita
Dead or Alive Xtreme 3 Original release date: AS: March 24, 2016	Notes: Released as Dead or Alive Xtreme 3: Fortune on PlayStation 4 and Dead or Alive Xtreme 3: Venus on Playstation Vita.; The starting roster of 10 characters (out of a possible 14) was determined via an official fan poll.; A free-to-play version was released on PlayStation 4 on May 16, 2016.; A VR mode DLC was released on January 24, 2017 but was delisted from the PlayStation store in early 2024.
Dead or Alive Xtreme 3 Scarlet Original release date: AS: March 20, 2019	Release years by system: 2019 – PlayStation 4, Nintendo Switch
Dead or Alive Xtreme 3 Scarlet Original release date: AS: March 20, 2019	Notes: Expanded version of Xtreme 3 with two additional characters: Leifang and Misaki from Venus Vacation.; A free-to-play version was released on Nintendo Switch on May 30, 2019.; Gameplay modes from Fortune are missing on the PlayStation 4 version of Scarlet.

=== Spin-offs ===
Game	Details
DOA Paradise♪ Original release date: JP: November 16, 2006	Release years by system: 2006 – Mobile
DOA Paradise♪ Original release date: JP: November 16, 2006	Notes: Phone game released for the i-mode and EZweb services.; Delisted from both platforms on January 31, 2016 and February 4, 2016 respectively.
Girls of DOA BlackJack: the Kasumi version -; Original release date: WW: June 7, 2009	Release years by system: 2009 – iOS
Girls of DOA BlackJack: the Kasumi version -; Original release date: WW: June 7, 2009	Notes: The game features Kasumi as a blackjack table dealer.; Sales on the App Store were suspended on February 22, 2010.
Dead or Alive Paradise Original release dates: NA: March 30, 2010; EU: April 1, 2010; JP: April 2, 2010	Release years by system: 2010 – PlayStation Portable
Dead or Alive Paradise Original release dates: NA: March 30, 2010; EU: April 1, 2010; JP: April 2, 2010	Notes: Port of Dead or Alive Xtreme 2 for the PlayStation Portable with an additional character, fewer minigames, and removed microtransactions.; Final game in the series to be released worldwide.
Dead or Alive Xtreme Venus Vacation Original release dates: JP: November 15, 2017; AS: April 10, 2019	Release years by system: 2017 – Windows
Dead or Alive Xtreme Venus Vacation Original release dates: JP: November 15, 2017; AS: April 10, 2019	Notes: Free-to-play gacha game announced at Tokyo Game Show 2016.; Initially released in Japan via DMM Games Player and later in select Southeast Asian countries via Steam with Chinese, Korean, and English language support.; Unlike previous Xtreme games, Venus Vacation is a sports management game with the player taking the role of the island's manager.; Only game in the series to feature asynchronous multiplayer.
Dead or Alive Xtreme Sense Original release dates: JP: December 21, 2017	Release years by system: 2017 – Arcades
Dead or Alive Xtreme Sense Original release dates: JP: December 21, 2017	Notes: Virtual reality game for the VR Sense arcade machine.; The starting roster consists of Kasumi, Honoka, and Marie Rose with additional characters added through updates.
Venus Vacation Prism: Dead or Alive Xtreme Original release dates: AS: March 27, 2025	Release years by system: 2025 – Windows, PlayStation 4, PlayStation 5
Venus Vacation Prism: Dead or Alive Xtreme Original release dates: AS: March 27, 2025	Notes: 3D adventure-style dating sim announced at Tokyo Game Show 2024.; The cast consists of five original characters from Venus Vacation and one from the mainline Dead or Alive series.

== Reception ==
Sales and review scores
Game	Year	Units sold (JP)	Famitsu	Metacritic
Dead or Alive Xtreme Beach Volleyball	2003	127,576	31/40	73/100
Dead or Alive Xtreme 2	2006	60,544	30/40	53/100
Dead or Alive Paradise	2010	54,071	29/40	38/100
Dead or Alive Xtreme 3	2016	190,000	32/40	43/100
Dead or Alive Xtreme 3 Scarlet	2019	20,033		
Venus Vacation Prism: Dead or Alive Xtreme	2025	12,380	32/40	71/100

While domestically Dead or Alive Xtreme has enjoyed moderate critical success, outside of Japan the series has been repeatedly criticized by the gaming press. Outside of Japan, the original Dead or Alive Xtreme Beach Volleyball received the highest ratings with average review scores in addition of being the best-selling game in the sub-series with around 600,000 copies sold worldwide, while its sequels sold less copies and scored mostly in the negative range with Dead or Alive Paradise and Dead or Alive Xtreme 3 having the lowest ratings.

Since its inception, the series has been referred as voyeuristic, soft porn, and guilty of perpetuating negative stereotypes. The franchise has been cited as a negative example of sexism in video games. Most games in the series have been controversial, even involving platform holders Microsoft and Sony and even legal authorities in certain instances.

Over time, the series has been reassessed in the West. Writing for IGN, Casey DeFreitas reflected on how the early games in the series deserved more recognition for their fun gameplay. Matt Sainsbury from Digitally Downloaded commented how Dead or Alive Xtreme 3 was more humorous and over-the-top than sleazy and that it excelled at what it set out to do. Jeff Grubb from VentureBeat stated that while certain in-game actions shown on the Xtreme 3 DLC trailer can make some viewers uncomfortable, technological advances in virtual reality and deepfakes raise bigger concerns as they can affect real people.
