= Dead or Alive (video game) =

1996 video game

- European arcade flyer featuring the game's cabinet along with characters Leifang (background), Tina (left), Gen Fu (center), and Jann Lee (right)
- Developer: Tecmo Creative #3
- Publishers: WW: Tecmo; EU: Acclaim (Arcade); EU: Sony Computer Entertainment (PS1)
- Directors: Tomonobu Itagaki; Katsunori Ehara; Takeshi Kawaguchi
- Producers: Tomonobu Itagaki; Yujin Rikimaru; Yutaka Koga
- Designers: Motohiro Shiga; Jun Hasunuma
- Writer: "Asamin"
- Composer: Makoto Hosoi
- Series: Dead or Alive
- Platforms: Arcade; Sega Saturn; PlayStation
- Release: November 26, 1996: Arcade; WW: November 26, 1996; JP: October 16, 1998 (++) Sega Saturn; JP: October 10, 1997 PlayStation; JP: March 12, 1998; NA: March 31, 1998; EU: July 1, 1998
- Genre: Fighting
- Modes: Single-player, multiplayer
- Arcade system: Sega Model 2 Sony ZN-1 (++)

Dead or Alive (Note: Japanese: DEAD OR ALIVE(デッドオアアライブ), Hepburn: Deddo oa Araibu; abbreviated as DOA) is a 1996 fighting game developed and published by Tecmo for arcades. It is the first entry in the Dead or Alive series. Built on the Sega Model 2 hardware, it was released first in arcades in 1996, followed by home ports for the Sega Saturn in Japan during 1997, and for the PlayStation in all regions during 1998.

Developed by Tecmo's in-house Team Ninja (known as Tecmo Creative #3 at the time), led by Tomonobu Itagaki, Dead or Alive capitalized on the success of Sega's Virtua Fighter series at the time and takes influence from it while adding unique gameplay elements of its own. Dead or Alive was well-praised for its fighting system and advanced graphics. The game also attracted attention for its presentation, which was more provocative than other mainstream 3D fighting games at the time.

Dead or Alive was a commercial success, helping Tecmo overcome their financial problems and turn the series into a franchise, including several sequels and numerous spin-offs. An enhanced version of the original game was included in Dead or Alive Ultimate for Xbox in 2004. In Japan, the game was released on PlayStation Network in 2008. The game was followed by its first sequel, Dead or Alive 2 in 1999.

== Gameplay ==
The gameplay of Dead or Alive borrows from Virtua Fighter, but includes some key differences. Dead or Alive's defining features are its speed and countering system. The game puts an emphasis on speed and relies more on simplistic commands and reaction time rather than long combo strings. Unlike other fighting games of the time, in place of a "guard" button, Dead or Alive uses a "hold" button, which causes the fighter to grab their opponent's limbs if they are attacking at the time. This countering system was the first in the fighting genre to utilize different commands that correspond to each type of attack. There are two kinds of holds, an Offensive Hold and a Defensive Hold; the latter are executed by holding back or forward on the directional pad along with the guard input to either force away or counter-damage an opponent.

The outer edges of the fighting arena, called "danger zones", are set with explosives which deal a high amount of damage to any fighter who comes in contact with them. They can also send an affected character in the air so the opposing player can execute a juggling air combo. However, this can be avoided with a defensive roll.

== Characters ==
- Bayman, a Russian mercenary and commando hired to kill DOATEC's founder and CEO, Fame Douglas.
- Gen Fu, an old Chinese shini-rokugo-ken martial arts master and bookstore owner, who enters the tournament to win the prize money in order to provide funds for his sick granddaughter, Mei Linn.
- Jann Lee, a Chinese jeet-kune-do martial artist, who enters the tournament with the desire to challenge himself against powerful opponents. His character is modeled on Bruce Lee.
- Kasumi, a Japanese kunoichi of the Mugen Tenshin Ninja Clan, who abandons her village to search for Raidou, the man who crippled her older brother, Hayate.
- Leifang, a young Chinese taikyoku-ken prodigy, who enters the tournament to defeat Jann Lee.
- Raidou ^{a}, an evil ninja exiled from Kasumi's clan.
- Ryu Hayabusa, a Japanese ninja hero of the Hayabusa Ninja Clan and best friend of Kasumi's brother. He enters the tournament to fulfil his thirst for a challenge. He is originally from Ninja Gaiden.
- Tina Armstrong, a flamboyant American professional wrestler, who enters the tournament to be noticed by Hollywood.
- Zack, a flamboyant African-American DJ and kickboxer, who enters the tournament to win the prize money.

The PlayStation and Arcade++ versions feature two additional characters:

- Ayane ^{b}, a Japanese kunoichi from the same clan as Kasumi. Ayane was ordered to kill Kasumi for abandoning their village.
- Bass Armstrong, an American professional wrestling champion and father of Tina. He tries to stop Tina from being noticed by Hollywood.

^a Boss character, unlockable and playable only in the console versions and Dead or Alive++
^b Unlockable in the PlayStation version

== Plot ==
A massive corporation known as DOATEC (Dead or Alive Tournament Executive Committee), host a fighting competition called the Dead or Alive World Combat Championship, where fighters from all over the world can compete for the title as world champion and a vast amount of money. A runaway kunoichi known as Kasumi, enters the Dead or Alive tournament to seek revenge against her uncle Raidou, who was responsible for crippling her older brother, Hayate.

Kasumi's brother, Hayate, was next in line to succeed their father, Shiden, as the 18th leader of the Mugen Tenshin Ninja Clan. After Hayate was crippled by Raidou, Shiden was left bitter from what Raidou did to his son, and Shiden refused to discuss the details surrounding the attack. Shiden ordered his daughter, Kasumi, to take her brother's place as the next leader of their clan. However, Kasumi abandoned the village. Learning that her evil uncle was her brother's attacker, Kasumi tracks him down to the Dead or Alive tournament where she enters to defeat him.

Kasumi eventually defeats and kills Raidou, but her decision to leave her village without permission violates the strict laws of the ninja society and is punishable by death. As a result, she becomes a hunted fugitive.

== Development and release ==
During the mid 1990s, Japanese gaming company Tecmo was in financial trouble as the company invested heavily in sports games for years, but faced tough competition from EA's rise during that period. After three consecutive years of losses, Tecmo was on the verge of bankruptcy by 1995 and was in desperately need of a new game to turn things around. Seeing how popular Sega's Virtua Fighter series and their Daytona USA racing game were in Japan at the time, Tecmo's management asked Tomonobu Itagaki to create either a fighting or racing game similar to either Virtua Fighter or Daytona USA. Itagaki ultimately chose to create a fighting game and was a fan of Virtua Fighter, but he wanted Dead or Alive to stand out among the competition. This included a strong emphasis on being fast-paced and being provocative, as Itagaki believed entertainment needed both violence and sexuality to truly be entertainment. All the animations in the game were created using motion capture. Some staff members had worked on Tecmo's first fighting game, Tōkidenshō Angel Eyes, and are credited for both games.

The original game, which runs on the Sega Model 2 arcade board, the same arcade board that Virtua Fighter 2 ran on, had polygonal modeled backgrounds. Dead or Alive was unveiled alongside Jaleco's Super GT 24h at the February 1996 AOU show as part of Sega's announcement that they were licensing their Model 2 hardware to third-party companies. It was released worldwide in November 1996.

In comparison to other 3D fighters, such as Tekken (which gained a substantial market base in Japan and North America), DOA introduced a countering system unique to the genre and an added emphasis on speed, as well as a rich graphics engine that lacked many jaggies and incorporated very smooth surfaces.

A Nintendo 64 port was rumored, but did not come to fruition. Dead or Alive was instead ported to the Sega Saturn exclusively for the Japanese market in 1997. The Japanese release was originally set for December, but the developers finished the conversion ahead of schedule and it was released on October 10. Acclaim intended to bring the Saturn version to the UK by Christmas 1997, but due to the Saturn's poor market performance in Europe and North America, and with the Saturn's popularity in Japan on the decline by the end of 1997, plans for a European and North American release were canceled.

When ported to the Saturn, the developers used Gouraud shading (a feature not available on Model 2) for the character models to compensate for the Saturn not being able to generate as many polygons as the Model 2 hardware. The Saturn conversion uses bitmaps and parallax scrolling in the same fashion as the Saturn version of Virtua Fighter 2. It also includes a new rendered intro and tournament and training modes. In an interview published in the September 1997 issue of Sega Saturn Magazine, director Tomonobu Itagaki discussed Tecmo's use of Sega's Model 2 arcade hardware and the technical challenges of the Saturn conversion with Sega AM2's Yu Suzuki. During the discussion, Suzuki expressed interest in seeing Dead or Alive developed for Sega's more powerful Model 3 arcade system.

In 1998, Tecmo released Dead or Alive for the PlayStation in all regions. It was the first game designed for Sega arcade hardware to be ported to the PlayStation. This version included two new characters, a different graphics engine, a slightly revamped fighting engine, new alternate costumes, and new background music. Most of the PlayStation version's development team had worked on the original arcade version. Also in 1998, Tecmo released for the arcades in Japan an upgrade titled Dead or Alive++, which was based on the PlayStation version with slightly updated gameplay that was later expanded for the sequel, Dead or Alive 2.

=== Digital release ===
On December 8, 2008, the PlayStation version of Dead or Alive was made available as a downloadable game for the PlayStation 3 on the Japanese PlayStation Network.

== Reception ==
Reception

Aggregate scores
| Aggregator | Score |
|---|---|
| GameRankings | 82% (SAT); 84% (PS1) |
| Metacritic | 84/100 (PS1) |

Review scores
| Publication | Score |
|---|---|
| AllGame | 4.5/5 (ARC); 4.5/5 (SAT); 4/5 (PS1) |
| Computer and Video Games | 5/5 (SAT); 4/5 (PS1) |
| Electronic Gaming Monthly | 7.625/40 (PS1) |
| Famitsu | 31/40 (PS1); 8/10, 7/10, 9/10, 9/10 (SAT) |
| Game Informer | 7.75/10 (PS1) |
| GameFan | 280/300 (SAT) |
| GameSpot | 6.8/10 (SAT); 7.3/10 (PS1) |
| IGN | 8.5/10 (PS1) |
| Next Generation | 4/5 (ARC, SAT) |
| Dengeki PlayStation | 80/100, 90/100, 80/100, 85/100 |
| Sega Saturn Magazine | 94% (SAT) |

In Japan, Game Machine listed Dead or Alive on their January 1, 1997 issue as being the most-popular arcade game for the previous two weeks. Game Machine also listed Dead or Alive++ on their November 15, 1998 issue as being the eleventh most-popular arcade game for the previous two weeks.

Although it was not widely distributed in U.S. arcades, Dead or Alive was a commercial success. After a loss of 5.2 million dollars (490 million yen) in 1995, Dead or Alive helped Tecmo pull in a profit of 9.2 million dollars (970 million yen) in 1996, saving the company from bankruptcy. The Sega Saturn version would top the Japanese charts on release, coming in number 1 during Week 41 in 1997. The initial run of 92,000 copies sold out on the day of release. It would go on to sell more than 161,000 copies in Japan. The PlayStation version would come in 3rd place during week 11 in 1998, selling over 59,000 copies during its first week and would sell over 74,000 copies. The combined sales of the Sega Saturn and PlayStation versions totaled over 235,000 copies in Japan alone.

Upon the game's release in arcades, a Next Generation reviewer commented, "A fighting game that mimics Virtua Fighter 2 in its look and feel to a frightening degree ... Dead or Alive boasts smooth control, crisp polygonal graphics, and an attitude that may enable this game to stand on its own despite its familiar origins." He identified the variety of characters and the danger zones as the game's standout features, and said the tough AI forces players to learn more complex moves and strategies.

The home versions were successful critically as well. Due to the Saturn version's planned (and eventually aborted) releases in the U.S. and UK, it saw a considerable number of reviews in those two countries. Sega Saturn Magazine described Dead or Alive as "An incredible beat 'em up both technically and visually, even getting close to beating Sega's own-brand VF [Virtua Fighter] games." Computer and Video Games called it "an essential buy for import Saturn gamers", while Next Generation commented, "Dead or Alive is such a polished game that it's surprising to realize this is Tecmo's first 3D fighter." GamePro lauded it for its vast number of moves and throws, and its fast and intense fights.

Praise for the game typically focused on its "hold" mechanic. Next Generation said this mechanic adds a unique tone to the game and blurs the line between offense and defense during fights, replacing the usual fighting game scenario of one character attacking and the other defending with more of a "push-and-pull" struggle for dominance. Electronic Gaming Monthly editor-in-chief John Davison commented that the requisite "use of a character's weight and inertia blazes a trail for other games to follow." One of his co-reviewers, Dan Hsu, said the system of holds and reversals is the best part of the game. GameSpot noted that using holds, "you can counter holds and attacks and then reverse counters on top of that, so you sometimes can get an awesome Jackie Chan-style grappling match that goes back and forth three or four times till someone messes up and pays the consequences." GamePro, in their review of the PlayStation version, was one of the few to challenge the mechanic's value, arguing that adding an element of aggression to a defensive tactic reduces the gameplay's depth, making Dead or Alive a game for beginners who cannot handle the complexity of other fighting games.

The "bouncing breast" feature was widely ridiculed for its exaggerated and prolonged animation, which critics regarded as comical and grotesque rather than appealing. Sega Saturn Magazine noted that the breasts "wobble up and down like jellies and seem to operate totally independently to the rest of the girl's body", and Jeff Gerstmann similarly remarked in GameSpot that "They bounce around like gelatin for no apparent reason." He considered it a relief that the feature can be turned off, describing it as "stupid" and "the very definition of overkill." IGN was not as annoyed, but pointed out that the bouncing breasts "don't actually contribute to the gameplay except to add temporary novelty and libido frustration to the typical gamer." Computer and Video Games found humor in how "The slightest movement is enough to set them off, swinging and bouncing around in a most comical fashion!" The reviewer compared it unfavorably to the more realistic breast physics in Fighting Vipers.

A number of reviewers praised the quality of the arcade-to-Saturn conversion, and most applauded this version's high-resolution graphics and detail. German magazine Sega Magazin awarded the Saturn version 93%, with reviewer Hans Ippisch praising its detailed character models and animation, which he considered technically superior to Virtua Fighter 2. However, he criticised the comparatively simple two-dimensional backgrounds and regarded the sound as less impressive than the graphics. Italian magazine Mega Console awarded the Saturn version an overall score of 80 out of 100, praising its detailed character models, fluid animation and technical presentation. The magazine awarded graphics 90, sound 85, gameplay 82 and longevity 75, but criticized the limited selection of eight regular playable characters, absence of individual character endings and lack of originality compared with other contemporary fighting games.

Japanese critics also responded positively to the Sega Saturn version. Sega Saturn Magazine awarded it scores of 8, 9 and 8 out of 10, averaging 8.33, with reviewers praising its fast-paced combat, counterattack mechanics and technical presentation. In the magazine's final reader rankings, published in 2000, Dead or Alive placed 26th with an average score of 9.3728 out of 10.

Reviews for the later PlayStation version hailed it as even better, with enhanced graphics and enjoyable new content which adds to the replay value. IGN went so far as to say that "The Model 2 graphics have ported over to the PlayStation better than they've ever been on the Saturn". (Many of the Sega Saturn's killer apps were Model 2 ports, including Virtua Fighter 2).

GamesRadar included Dead or Alive at number 28 in their list of best Sega Saturn games, stating that "the game's high-speed, rock-paper-scissors style of play was a quick hit with arcade players". In 2011, Complex ranked it as the seventh best fighting game of all time.

== Enhanced version ==
In 2004, Tecmo released Dead or Alive Ultimate, a package that featured revamps of the first two DOA games, on the Xbox. The enhanced version of the first game was based on the Sega Saturn version, as it was Itagaki's preferred version. It featured smoother graphics, sound updated from stereo to surround, and adds Xbox Live online gaming. Both Dead or Alive 1 Ultimate and Dead or Alive 2 Ultimate were among the first fighting games with online play.

== See also ==
- Tōkidenshō Angel Eyes - spiritual precursor of Dead or Alive
