= Tina Armstrong =

Dead or Alive character

- Dead or Alive character
- Tina Armstrong in Dead or Alive 2 (1999)
- First appearance: Dead or Alive (1996)
- Created by: Tomonobu Itagaki
- Designed by: Tomonobu Itagaki; Yutaka Saito (DOA5, DOA6); Yohei Shimbori (DOA6)
- Voiced by: English: Kate Higgins (DOAX2–present); Japanese: Mami Koyama; Yūko Nagashima (DOA2–present)
- Portrayed by: Jaime Pressly (film)

In-universe information
- Fighting style: Professional wrestling
- Origin: Texas, United States
- Nationality: American

Tina Armstrong (Japanese: ティナ・アームストロング, Hepburn: Tina Āmusutorongu) is a character in the Dead or Alive fighting game series by Koei Tecmo. Introduced in Dead or Alive, she was originally conceived as a tropical "deadly dancer" character by lead developer Tomonobu Itagaki, but was later changed to a professional wrestler due to the development team's love for the sport. The daughter of fellow character Bass Armstrong, he wants her to follow in his footsteps as a wrestler, but she has ambitions to be a model, actress and rock star, much to his dismay. Through the course of the franchise, she has been voiced by Mami Koyama, Yūko Nagashima and Kate Higgins.

Since her debut Tina has been very popular, praised for her character's physical beauty and her personality, most heavily by Asian media outlets. Additional praise has been given to her relationship with Bass, but also how well her character background such as being a model works with titles such as the Dead or Alive Xtreme series. She has also been cited as a positive example of a female character in literary sources and seen as a partial response to a growing female gaming demographic. Other publications have derided the series' emphasis on sex appeal through her, seeing her as an example of the sexualization of women in video games.

== Conception and creation ==
Though the "Deadly Dancer" concept (left) was abandoned, aspects of it influenced Tina appearance in the first game. Meanwhile, many of her outfits (right) focus heavily on fanservice, with the developers feeling that cowgirl attire suited her and using variations of the design across the series.

While working on Koei Tecmo's first Dead or Alive game, lead developer Tomonobu Itagaki wanted to emphasize character expression, taking inspiration from the wrestling group nWo. Tina was originally envisioned to be a "Deadly Dancer", a tropical girl character that fought hit-and-run tactics with "light, dance-like steps". Meanwhile, the character Bass Armstrong, at this point in development called "T-Bass", was planned to be the game's professional wrestling practitioner, as they felt it was a staple of fighting games at that point. Itagaki stated however due to having a lack of interest regarding and ignorance of professional wrestling, Bass was shelved and he focused working on Tina instead. This caused an outcry from the development team, as many of them were professional wrestling fans themselves and did not want omit the fighting style from the game. As a result Itagaki revised his initial concept, with Tina being the debut wrestler for the game's initial release, with motion capture used to create her animations. While Bass was later implemented in the PlayStation port of Dead or Alive, set up in the series' lore as Tina's father, the original dancer idea would be revisited in the series through the character Lisa Hamilton.

To develop her attacks and animation they took inspiration from Japanese female wrestler Manami Toyota, such as her Japanese Ocean Cyclone suplex. Itagaki meanwhile began researching old wrestling footage. However, the development team had some difficulty as they felt heavy wrestling moves such as chops would not work as well coming from a female character. Bass's introduction helped, as they were able to give him more refined powerful moves the developers wanted to include. Some techniques such as her Rodeo Hold meanwhile were removed between iterations of the game due to Itagaki feeling they did not translate well to the game's visual presentation. Others were completely redone for Dead or Alive 2, due to Itagaki feeling they weren't quite where he wanted them in terms of presentation, though he had to be careful with the workload given to the motion capture team as they had limited time.

Meanwhile the planning team was in charge of developing her personality, and Itagaki was glad they were able to present her as a cheerful American character. He specifically chose Texas as the origin for Tina and Bass to help solidify this image, and he was pleased when fans from the state told him they considered the characters very Texan. Itagaki further observed that of the cast Tina was the most popular with American audiences, which led him to develop other characters such as Lisa to help a wider cultural playerbase feel included.

=== Design ===
Standing 174 centimetres (5 ft 8 1/2 in) tall with measurements of 95-60-89 cm (37-24-35 in), Tina is a white American woman with blue eyes and blonde hair that extends down her neck and frames her face. According to Itagaki, Tina was intended as a blonde at her debut, but due to hardware issues with the Sega NAOMI arcade hardware they could not properly render her hair color, making it appear darker than intended in the first game. However, according to the development team it was originally brown as a remnant of her original tropical woman design. In the first game, several of her outfits alternate between giving her brown and blonde hair, where in the game's sequel her setting was revised and her hair color was now strictly blonde.

For the original Dead or Alive, the development team wanted to counter the then-perception that it was impossible to "create beautiful girls in 3D", with Itagaki aiming to create "Digital Venus" designs that would be popular on media character rankings. To this end particular emphasis was placed on the size and movement of the cast's breasts, in part due to the development team's own preference and what they perceived as a "breast boom" in Japan at the time, an increase in average bust sizes across the nation. Tina's breasts are the largest amongst the series' primary cast, an aspect along with her "joyful" personality they felt significantly contributed to her high popularity in location test surveys for the first game's arcade release. With Dead or Alive 5, her model was significantly redesigned, part of an effort by the developers to reduce the game's sexualization of the female cast in response to feedback from Koei Tecmo's overseas branch. The changes in the game led to some backlash from fans however, and some aspects were reverted.

When developing her initial outfit, several Japanese female wrestling outfits were considered. In the first game, her primary outfit consisted of a sleeveless red shirt tie up to expose her midriff, black leggings, and red gloves with circular weights around each wrist. In the game's sequel her outfit changed to incorporate a black bustier bra with matching laced high-cut spats, a sleeveless white high cut jacket, white cowboy boots, and white frills that dangle off her lower arms. This remained her primary outfit in several titles such as Dead or Alive 3, or was included as an alternative. Meanwhile throughout the series she has multiple other outfit options, some of which designed with fanservice in mind such as a catsuit with a tail. Others incorporated either cowgirl or American flag aesthetics as the development team felt both suited her. For Dead or Alive 6, they focused on popular wrestling-themed outfits at the time. They struggled with how realistic to make her look, wanting to give her a "lively Texas girl" aesthetic but not to the point of taking away from her "superstar" aspect.

== Appearances ==
Tina Armstrong was introduced in the 1996 fighting video game Dead or Alive by Koei Tecmo, and is the daughter of professional wrestler Bass. Tina's mother died when she was young, with Bass raising her as a single father and wanting her to follow in his footsteps as a professional wrestler. Tina however wished to be a model, and the two routinely bicker and fight over her future. After Bass entered the Dead or Alive fighting tournament, she took part herself hoping the exposure would help launch that career. Despite Bass' interference, she successfully garners such attention at the end of Dead or Alive 2's tournament, and later also becomes a rock star. She enters the subsequent tournaments hoping to propel her career further and become a Hollywood actress, with Bass still wanting her to instead follow in his footsteps. By Dead or Alive 6, Tina has formed a wrestling group with her father and MMA fighter Mila, hoping to use the exposure to run as a state governor.

In terms of gameplay, Tina is designed to be a "brute" style character that does heavy hitting attacks, however lacks the strength of some of the game's cast. To balance this, she has higher agility than those other characters, able to perform short combos or strong singular attacks, such as launching herself butt first with her hips to collide with the opponent. Much of Tina's gameplay revolves around countering an opponent's attacks selectively, and being careful to not be countered herself. Additionally she has a wide variety of grab type moves, and a special attack that can be performed when her back is against a wall, leaping off it and grabbing the opponent in a bodyslam.

Outside of the main series titles, she also appears in the first two Dead or Alive Xtreme spinoff games. While she was originally excluded from Dead or Alive Xtreme 3 she later appeared in Venus Vacation to celebrate Dead or Alive's 25th anniversary. Producer Yasunori Sakuda noted it was done with some difficulty, as he felt the fanbase would have reacted badly to a "half-hearted effort". In other media, Tina appears in the live-action film DOA: Dead or Alive (2006), portrayed by Jaime Pressly. She also appears in several stories in the gag comic series Dead or Alive 2 Comic Anthology by DNA Media Comics.

In Japanese, Tina was voiced by Mami Koyama in the first game, with Yūko Nagashima taking over the role for all subsequent game appearances. Meanwhile, starting with the release of Dead or Alive Xtreme 2 she is voiced in English by Kate Higgins, who performs her character with a Southern accent. In an interview with Gamest magazine, Koyama praised Tina's strength and figure, feeling that the character would be popular with men. Nagashima by contrast grew heavily attached to the character, with Sakuda stating in an interview Nagashima was elated to voice the character again for her appearance in Venus Vacation due to the long period of time between it and Dead or Alive 6.

== Promotion and reception ==
To promote the first game's release, Tecmo published cosplay guides for the female cast, and for the Sega Saturn version, they developed costumes based on the designs, hiring a cosplayer to portray Tina and partnering with publisher Dengeki Strategy King to compare the model and her in-game counterpart. At a release party to promote Dead or Alive 2, a variety of merchandise was released including pin-up posters, clothing items, and figurines featuring Tina. An in-game "black bunny" swimsuit for Tina was included with pre-orders of Dead or Alive 5. Other merchandise to promote the character has included 3D mouse pads, trading cards, a Xbox controller, and women's swimwear. As part of a cross-promotion with Tecmo Koei, Sega featured Tina and other Dead or Alive characters on digital cards that were added to the PlayStation Vita release of their game Samurai & Dragons.

Tina has been well received as a character since her debut, described by Paragon Publishing's Dreamcast Magazine as "the consummate" babe of Dead or Alive 2. Brazilian magazine SuperGamePower's editor in chief expressed surprise when readers voted her their favorite female video game character among a wide selection, though understood why, praising her design for having "thick legs and a lot of opulence". The staff of Kakuchopurei stated her moves and fighting style were "in-your-face and graceful", comparing her to the character King of the Tekken series "but with a svelte figure that somehow hits hard like a Mac truck [sic]." Additional praise was given for her wrestling stage outfits, particularly as the series progressed, and the allure of her Southern accent. Meanwhile, Mike Fahey of Kotaku praised her design change for Dead or Alive 5, calling her previous appearance "a meaty amazon" compared to her new "lean, mean wrestling machine" look.

Hiroyuki Endo of Japanese website Game Watch called her father-daughter dynamic with Bass one of the best aspects of the Dead or Alive series, and further praised how he supported her privately as "somehow warm and comforting". He was particularly glad to see her return in Venus Vacation, stating her "activeness is still alive and well in this game", and additionally praised how her background as a model worked with the Xtreme titles, fitting the game's "dress up" aspect through various outfits and swimwear while also bringing a sense of cuteness to her. Endo expressed that while there was a lot of emphasis on the character's breasts, he found the hips in her character design more appealing, and enjoyed the humor in how her gameplay in the series allowed her to use them as a literal weapon against opponents, and furthermore called the proportions of her character design "perfect from any angle".

Other Asian outlets offered similar praise. Famitsu's Zenji Nishikawa stated she has "a wild and unrestrained personality", enjoying her interactions with the other characters and further calling her "cheerful" and that "just looking at her will make you feel better." Dengeki Online writer "kbj" stated that while he initially had a "slightly flashy image", but upon seeing her revamped character design for Dead or Alive 5 he was surprised by her cuteness and how attractive she seemed, and felt games like Venus Vacation portrayed her actual personality as "always positive and powerful." The staff of Chinese website Games.sina.com.cn meanwhile described her as a character "embodies the undeniable toughness of a modern woman, the strength of a wrestler, and the determination to fight for her goals". They additionally shared Endo's praise for her legs, stating that while they were "slightly thick and slightly inconsistent with the gorgeous style", players appreciated them. They also stated her design helped offset what the felt was a jarring Japanese aspect of her aesthetic, which by itself made her less appealing to them than other characters in the series like the British Helena.

In a discussion with Takashi Kurokochi, orthopedic surgeon and director of the Yurakucho Cosmetic Surgery Clinic, Japanese magazine Game Hihyou asked him to comment on female characters in fighting games and what made their designs particularly beautiful in the eyes of Japanese audiences, among them Tina and Helena. Kurokochi noted the emphasized lower jaw and cheekbones of their character designs, feeling it gave their faces a distinctive contour. He drew comparison to actress Audrey Hepburn as a prominent example of Western beauty, stating she had similar features but was not considered beautiful by Asian standards due to her small face. In contrast, Tina and Helena had more balanced facial features, something he felt helped set them apart.

=== Regarding sexualization and impact ===
Various publications were more critical of Tina's appearance, such as the book The Psychology of Entertainment Media, which cited an image of her in a bikini as an example of a "sexualized, objectified video game character" and its impact on societal perception. The book Sex in Consumer Culture cited her as an example of a hypersexualized female character in video games often portrayed as having "uncharacteristically large breasts and unusually small waists". In his review of Dead or Alive 5, National Post writer Matthew O'Mara noted that series newcomer Mila's less sexualized design was the opposite of Tina's, yet both characters "suffer from the same sexist design choices". He particularly called out the decision to give Tina additional animations that "make her breasts flop about while most of the other characters remain stationary" alongside clothing options that emphasized this aspect, and felt it served to "appeal to the lowest common denominator of who they think are playing the games: Men who stare at boobs." In contrast, Zachary Miller of Nintendo World Report appreciated the attention to detail, citing Tina as one of the best examples of breast physics in modern gaming due to how naturally they reacted to clothing, though at the same time he felt they were unnatural on her model, particularly in how they should rest on the character's chest, and this caused a similar feel with her animations.

Others offered a contrary point of view, such as the book Femme Fatalities that cited Tina as an example of a trend of strong action heroine characters introduced in video games, something the authors regarded as a response to a growing demographic of female gamers. Author Christopher B. Patterson cited her as an example of how the Dead or Alive series "depicted the 'cultural fragrance' of racial identities through a kawaii minimalism", noting how both she and Bass represent Japanese views of Southern American culture through their blonde hair and use of the American flag on their attire. He further stated that the series "enhanced these stereotypes by dramatizing them with exhuberant personalities" that integrated their national backgrounds into their fighting styles. He argued the sex appeal aspect also played into this and encouraged players to mentally associate her fighting technique with cultural "fetish". Patterson further argued that elements such as sexualized attire, which included items such as a cow print bikini, helped illustrate her racial and cultural identity as an "explicit pleasure" for players to enjoy.
