= Dead or Alive Xtreme Venus Vacation =

2017 beach volleyball simulation video game

- Splash art featuring the 10 starting characters
- Developer: Team Ninja (Note: International version developed by Koei Tecmo Singapore)
- Publisher: Koei Tecmo
- Directors: Lee Guo Yan; Soh Yi Heng
- Producer: Yasunori Sakuda
- Composer: Hiroaki Takahashi
- Series: Dead or Alive Xtreme
- Engine: Soft Engine
- Platform: Microsoft Windows
- Release: JP: November 15, 2017; CN/KR/SEA: April 10, 2019
- Genre: Sports management video game
- Mode: Single-player

Dead or Alive Xtreme Venus Vacation (Note: Japanese: デッド オア アライブ エクストリーム ヴィーナス バケーション, Hepburn: Deddo oa Araibu Ekusutorīmu Vīnasu Bākeishon; DOAXVV) is a sports management gacha game for Microsoft Windows developed by Team Ninja and published by Koei Tecmo. The game was released in Japan on November 15, 2017 via DMM Games and later on select Asian countries via Steam on April 10, 2019.

== Gameplay ==
Unlike previous games in the Dead or Alive Xtreme series, in Venus Vacation the player does not directly control the characters during the two-versus-two beach volleyball matches. Instead, the game employs a turn-based strategy system in which the player can issue commands during time outs to prioritize offensive or defensive play, substitute players to conserve their stamina, and choose which opponent to target.

In-game festivals refresh weekly, introducing new story events and swimsuits that can be acquired through gacha banners. For the duration of the festival, new suits provide a score bonus. Each festival has beach volleyball matches divided in difficulty levels where the higher the level cleared, the higher the rewards obtained. Rewards include premium currency, tickets to use on the game's gacha, and consumable items to gift to the characters to raise their character level. As characters level up, new episodes and gravure video-styled cutscenes are unlocked.

Venus Vacation has an extensive photo mode in which the player can make the characters pose in different parts of the Venus Island including the beach, bar, onsen, and the player's private room. The latter can be decorated by the player with different motifs.

== Development ==
After the release of Dead or Alive Xtreme 3, series producer Yosuke Hayashi noticed that one of the trailers became the most watched video on Koei Tecmo's YouTube channel. Despite reaching 1.6 million views, this did not translate into initial sales of that magnitude. To bring the series to that audience that could not play but was nevertheless interested, Venus Vacation was conceived as a free-to-play game. The sports management genre was selected to accommodate people used to mobile and browser games. It also aimed to introduce characters that were not fighters and wouldn't fit the mold of a traditional Dead or Alive game.

Dead or Alive Xtreme Venus Vacation was announced at Tokyo Game Show 2016 as PC-exclusive game. A year later during Tokyo Game Show 2017, Koei Tecmo revealed the first details about the game's gameplay and monetization. In September 2017, the inclusion of a new original character was announced and a trailer was released showcasing the ten characters available at launch along with more gameplay details.

On June 2021, Yasunori Sakuda was promoted from game director to producer replacing Yosuke Hayashi.

== Characters ==
Dead or Alive Xtreme Venus Vacation released with ten characters, nine originating from Dead or Alive Xtreme 3 plus a new character called Misaki. Players starting the game for the first time must select a pair of characters for their starting beach volleyball team. Over time, new characters can be unlocked via gacha.

All characters added post-release (with the exception of Leifang and Tina) have been original to Venus Vacation. Yasunori Sakuda commented that this was due to the difficulty in reintroducing existing characters to the spin-off due to their established relationships in the mainline Dead or Alive games. Conversely, it was much easier for him to create characters from scratch whose stories had a deeper focus with the player.

== Release ==
Dead or Alive Xtreme Venus Vacation was released in Japan on November 15, 2017 on the Japanese platform DMM Games. A Steam version, available only on select Asian countries entered open beta on March 26, 2019. This version supports English, Korean, and Chinese subtitles and was fully released on April 10, 2019. A cloud version was added to the DMM Games release on April 23, 2019. A second Steam version was released on August 19, 2020, connected to the original DMM Games version. A second international version was released on July 1, 2021 through the gaming platform Johren.

Due to its later release date, the international version of the game runs one year behind in content compared to the Japanese server. To make up for this content disparity, the international version would have occasional exclusive swimsuits and events created by the international development team that would come later to the original server. Since release, Venus Vacation has had several collaborations with other intellectual property. (Note: Supported by multiple references.)

== Reception ==
Due to the game's limited release, it did not receive enough reviews in the West to score at review aggregator Metacritic. Andrew Duncan from GameGrin gave the Steam release a 4.5/10, praising the game's graphics but criticizing its long loading times, repetitive gameplay and music. Matt Sainsbury from Digitally Downloaded acknowledged the game's controversial aspects but nonetheless praised its aesthetic, presentation, and relaxing gameplay. Gavin Sheehan from Bleeding Cool wrote that for both Venus Vacation and the Dead or Alive series as a whole, a lot of the extras and add-ons are often time-consuming or expensive to buy and that players shouldn't bother. Some swimsuits added post-release have been source of additional criticism.

Dead or Alive Xtreme Venus Vacation has been a success for Koei Tecmo as the game has remained profitable years after the game's launch and has reached almost a decade of operation.
