= Dead or Alive Xtreme 2 =

- North American cover art by Tom Lee
- Developer: Team Ninja
- Publisher: Tecmo
- Directors: Tomonobu Itagaki; Katsunori Ehara
- Producers: Tomonobu Itagaki; Katsunori Ehara
- Designer: Masato Onishi
- Artists: Kenichiro Nakajo; Yasushi Nakakura; Yutaka Saito
- Composer: Takumi Saito
- Series: Dead or Alive Xtreme
- Platform: Xbox 360
- Release: November 13, 2006: NA: November 13, 2006; JP: November 22, 2006; EU: December 8, 2006
- Genres: Sports, casino
- Modes: Single-player, multiplayer

Dead or Alive Xtreme 2 (Note: Japanese: DEAD OR ALIVE XTREME(デッドオアアライブエクストリーム) 2, Hepburn: Deddo oa Araibu Ekusutorīmu Tsū; also known as DOA Xtreme 2 or DOAX2) is a 2006 video game for the Xbox 360 game console. Developed by Team Ninja, it is the sequel to Dead or Alive Xtreme Beach Volleyball and final game in the series directed by Tomonobu Itagaki. The title expands upon the activities available in the original, supplementing beach volleyball with additional beach-related minigames.

== Gameplay ==
Much like its predecessor Dead or Alive Xtreme Beach Volleyball, DOA Xtreme 2 features a two-week vacation mode, where the player can indulge in a variety of activities. Each day is broken up into three segments (morning, afternoon, and evening), where players can perform a single activity during each.

In Dead or Alive Xtreme 2, players are able to play as any of the nine women present in the series at the time of the game's release. Each woman in the game has certain items and hobbies which she likes or dislikes, and these preferences influence her reaction upon receiving a gift. Characters also each have an individual favorite color, again affecting their like or dislike of a certain item (and the wrapping paper used to wrap it). Kokoro did not appear in Dead or Alive Xtreme Beach Volleyball and hence is a new addition to the cast of available volleyball players.

The game puts a strong emphasis on friendship; players (playing as one of the women) must befriend the other female characters by buying them gifts they enjoy from the various stores on the island, playing pool-hopping and playing butt battles. Doing so will increase the bond between the two characters.

The former "main event" from Dead or Alive Xtreme Beach Volleyball, beach volleyball is once again present. Similar to the original, players must have a partner in order to compete in a two-on-two 7-point volleyball match. The gameplay has been modified to make the game slightly more difficult and to add variety. While there are still only two buttons necessary for gameplay (pass/block and bump/spike), greater manual control is required as, unlike the original, the women will not automatically maneuver themselves into the best formation. In the online mode, two players can compete against each other, each having a computer-controlled partner. Lastly, the camera has been slightly modified to address the criticism that the one in the original game moved erratically or too frequently. The offline two player "Exhibition" mode from the previous game has been removed, forcing players who wish to play against other players to do so via Xbox Live.

An all new game mode which allows the women to race on jet skis, either offline or on Xbox Live. The game has been compared to the Wave Race series.

Aside from the main beach volleyball mode, this is the only mini-game which supports multiplayer play via Xbox Live, making all others single-player only:

- Pool Hopping is a mini-game carried over from the previous title, although with slight modifications to account for the lack of pressure sensitivity on the Xbox 360 controller. In this game, players race another non-player character, hopping across multi-colored floating pads.
- Beach Flags is a new mini-game to the series which is simple in nature, but can be quite difficult and frustrating.
- Butt Battle, also dubbed the "Hip Battle", challenges the player to knock her opponent off a shared floating pad before the same can be done to them.
- Tug-of-War is very similar to the "Butt Battle" in the manner in which it is played.
- The final mini-game, Water Slide, involves successfully sliding down a water slide at high speeds.

Shopping is an essential part of the game, buying accessories, swimsuits or food and drinks. Similar to the original, the game features a casino which players can visit during the evenings. Once there, one can partake in several games, including poker, blackjack, roulette and a variety of slot machines (themed after each woman). There are also three hotels for the women to stay. In addition, regarding the slot machines, getting all lucky sevens in Christie's Slot Machine will unlock a clip with the winning character performing a pole-dance routine in the selected attire.

== Plot ==
The background story to the game is that Zack has resurrected "Zack Island" from the depths of the sea, where it was buried following a previous volcanic eruption. He has re-dubbed it "New Zack Island". The instruction manual details the differing reasons for why each woman has come to the island, while cut-scenes further flesh out the plot details.

== Development ==
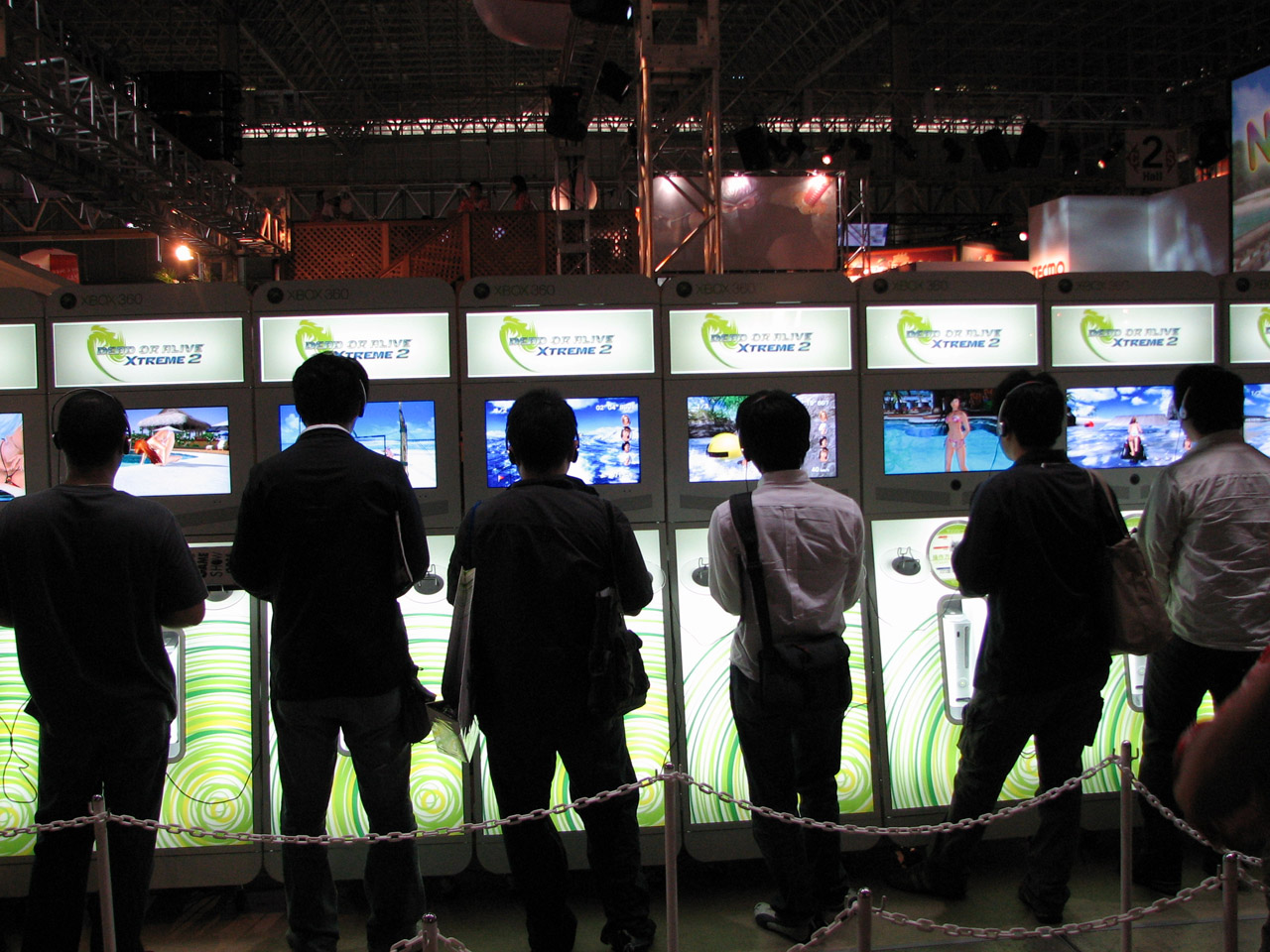
Dead or Alive Xtreme 2 promo booth at Tokyo Game Show 2006

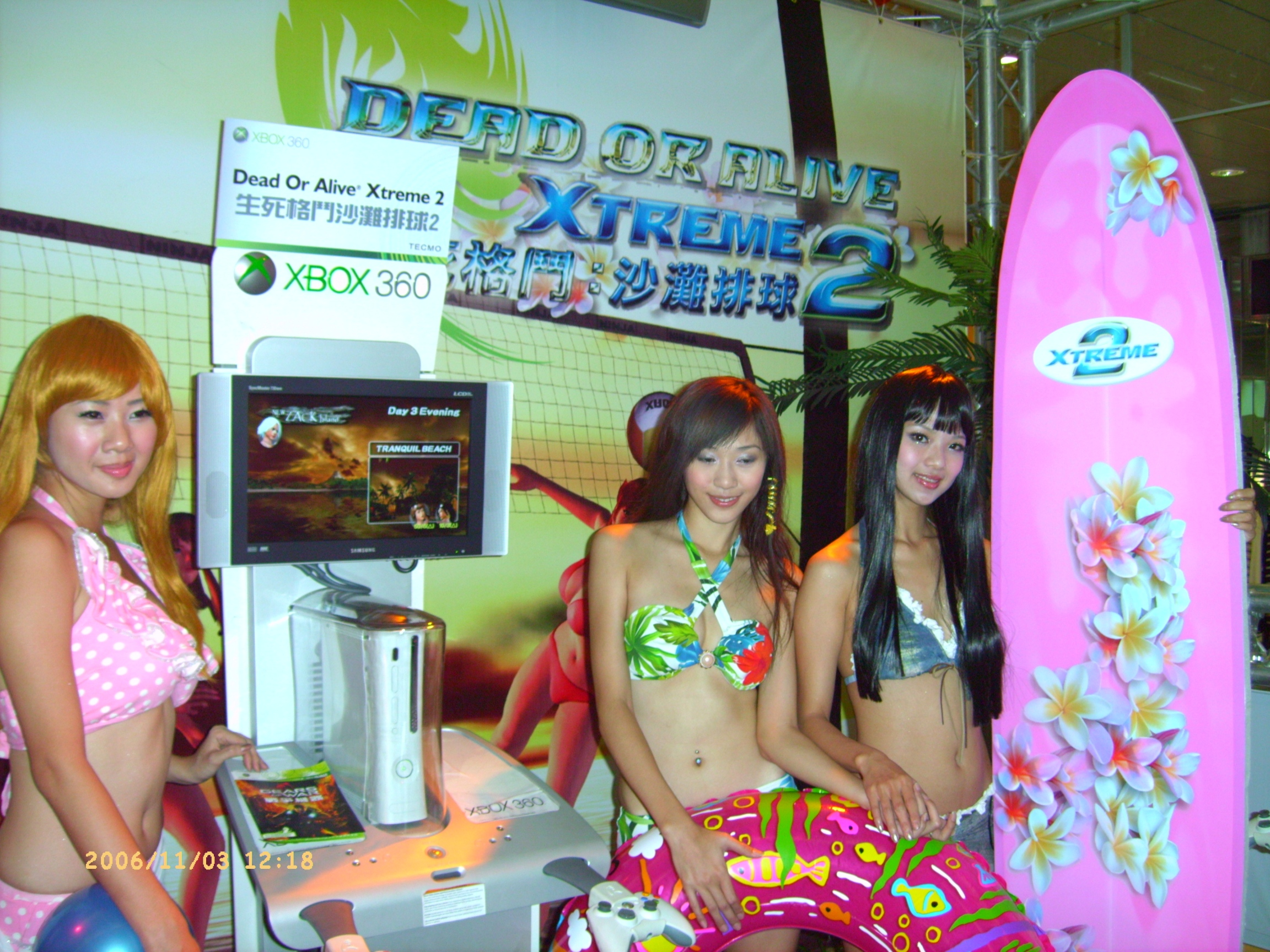
Dead or Alive Xtreme 2 promo booth at X06 Taiwan

Developed exclusively for the Xbox 360, the title runs on a heavily modified version of the engine used in Dead or Alive 4, allowing for new inclusions such as self-shadowing and new cloth simulation techniques. The Marine Race mini-game, however, uses a completely new physics engine, although with similar graphics.

As well as the gameplay tweaks (as compared to the original), various cosmetic modifications were made. For example, the female characters' individual breasts now have their own "physics". This allows each breast to behave differently, although this has been criticized for making the breasts move in an exaggerated fashion (i.e., they often continue moving for an unnaturally long time after a character has stopped moving and sometimes one or both breasts will freeze in mid-bounce). Additionally, the game adds a new "tan line system" in which swimsuits realistically block tanning; changing swimsuits frequently will prevent tan lines from appearing.

Instead of relying on a single game mode, Dead or Alive Xtreme 2 contains a number of different sub-games. Starting with an initial pool of 42 different mini-game ideas, only a total of seven games (counting beach volleyball) actually made the final cut. During the development process, creator Tomonobu Itagaki stated that he would not be adding activities like trampoline games and wet T-shirt contests to the series. He indicated that he felt that this would come off as vulgar and "show the women in a negative light". Despite this, however, a pole-dancing minigame/clip was included as a bonus after getting all 7s with Christie's slot machine in a certain order.

The English localization was overseen by Team Ninja member Andrew Szymanski, in collaboration with AltJapan Co., Ltd.

== Soundtrack ==
Song title	Artist
"Is This Love"	Bob Marley
"How Crazy Are You"	Meja
"Holla!"	Baha Men
"Double Lovin'"	Baha Men
"Sweet Sixteen"	Hilary Duff
"Sweet Sensual Love"	Big Mountain
"If It Don't Fit"	B*Witched
"Summer Breezin"	Diana King
"Like That Girl"	Fatty Koo
"Brazilian Sugar"	George Duke
"Reggae Dancer"	Inner Circle
"Lovin' You"	Janet Kay
"Quiero Que Me Quieras"	Olga Tañón
"Another Love Story"	Play
"The Kids Don't Like It"	Reel Big Fish
"Dreamin'"	Sweet Female Attitude
"Flowers (Cutfather & Joe Mix)"	Sweet Female Attitude
"Nothing To Lose"	Sweet Female Attitude

== Reception ==
Reception

Aggregate scores
Aggregator	Score
GameRankings	54%
Metacritic	53/100

Review scores
Publication	Score
1Up.com	D+
Edge	5/10
Electronic Gaming Monthly	4.33/10
Eurogamer	3/10
Game Informer	7.5/10
GameSpot	5.9/10
GameSpy	2.5/5
GameTrailers	6.5/10
IGN	6.4/10
Official Xbox Magazine (US)	6.5/10
X-Play	3/5

Dead or Alive Xtreme 2 received generally mixed reviews. GameRankings gave it a score of 54%, while Metacritic gave it 53 out of 100.

TeamXbox's Dale Nardozzi stressed that while Dead or Alive Xtreme 2 has impressive graphics, multiple activities and nice artistry, the game is simply not fun to play. On a scale of 1 to 10, the game got a score of 6.7, while the first Xtreme got a much higher score of 9.2. A review by Hilary Goldstein of IGN shared similar opinions, suggesting that the added mini-games, including the Butt Battle and Tug-of-War are based highly on luck, relying on an arbitrary button press to counteract what one thinks one's opponent is going to do next.

It was noted to be too similar to the original DOAX for many reviewers' likings, stating that a large amount of the female characters’ animations were taken from the original title and simply tweaked to fit the new game engine. Changes to the volleyball portion, still the main attraction of the game, have apparently made it significantly more difficult. Lastly, certain reviews criticized the new breast physics, causing them to bounce independently when running or moving and continue to jiggle or swing even when the character is still, resulting in awkward sequences. Elisa Moses from X-Play commented on the breast physics saying "The boobs move independent of each other. This is both comical and a little creepy. The breasts seem to have minds of their own, existing on a consciousness separate from their host body." ScrewAttack included it on their 2012 list of top ten "games that make you want to bone".

Dead or Alive Xtreme 2 came in at number 7 on Japanese charts with over 45,000 copies sold during week 48 in 2006.
