= Tomonobu Itagaki =

Japanese video game designer (1967–2025)

- 板垣 伴信
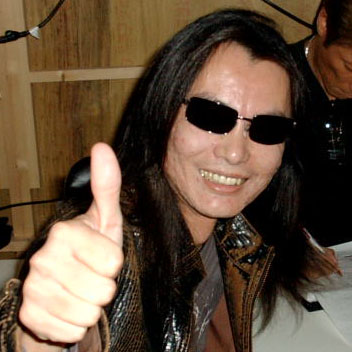
- Itagaki in 2004
- Born: April 1, 1967; Tokyo, Japan
- Died: October 2025 (aged 58)
- Education: Waseda University
- Occupation: Video game designer
- Years active: 1992–2025
- Children: 1

Tomonobu Itagaki (板垣 伴信, Itagaki Tomonobu; April 1, 1967 – c. October 2025) was a Japanese video game designer best known for creating the Dead or Alive series and also reviving the Ninja Gaiden franchise in 2004. In 2009, he was chosen by IGN as one of the top 100 game creators of all time.

Joining Tecmo in 1992, Itagaki produced two video game franchises that were critical and commercial successes, earning him several promotions; he headed Tecmo's development team, Team Ninja, and sat on the executive board. He left the company in June 2008 after 16 years of service, filing a lawsuit against its new president for withholding bonus pay. He formed a new company, Valhalla Game Studios, with several Team Ninja members and released Devil's Third. The company was dissolved in December 2021, although he had formed Itagaki Games earlier in 2021. Itagaki died in October 2025 at the age of 58.

== Early life ==
Tomonobu Itagaki was born in Tokyo on April 1, 1967. Itagaki later graduated from Waseda University Senior High School in March 1985. He enrolled in Waseda University and graduated from its School of Law in 1992.

== Career ==
=== Tecmo (1992–2008) ===
Itagaki joined Tecmo in 1992 as a graphics programmer, and initially worked on the Super Famicom Soccer video game, Captain Tsubasa 4, released in Japan, followed by the Super Famicom version of the American football video game, Tecmo Super Bowl, released worldwide. Between the choices of Tecmo and Sega, Itagaki chose to work for Tecmo as he lived closer to the company. He was mentored by Yoshiaki Inose (of Solomon's Key, Bomb Jack, Rygar and original Ninja Gaiden fame) and Akihiko Shimoji (Tecmo Bowl) in his early years at Tecmo, and learned from them to include fun as a necessary component in his projects. His career breakthrough came in 1996 with his first Dead or Alive game, a game based on Sega Model 2 hardware (Virtua Fighter) created in response to a request from the Tecmo management when the company was in financial trouble.

The release of Dead or Alive 2 greatly increased the series popularity, as well as Itagaki's. He had sought to create fighting games with details he felt were lacking in other games. However, at D.I.C.E. 2012, Itagaki said one of his managers at Tecmo tricked him into releasing the game on PlayStation 2 in Japan during March 2000 before he felt it was fully completed. The move greatly upset Itagaki, but despite the incident and the PS2's architecture being difficult to work with, he continued to further enhance Dead or Alive 2 on the system. Starting with Dead or Alive 3, Itagaki would release a series of successful games exclusively for Xbox. The move to Xbox was driven by how more powerful, developer friendly and easier the Xbox's architecture was to work with compared to other consoles, Itagaki became good friends with Microsoft's Seamus Blackley whose engineer team treated Itagaki as a guest of honor compared to Sony's engineers, and how Tecmo games generally underperformed on the PS2. Dead or Alive 3 became one of the Xbox's killer apps as it was a critical and commercial success. Itagaki's rise through Tecmo had been steady since then. He was appointed the head of Tecmo's third creative department in April 2001. and assumed the leadership of Team Ninja in July of the same year.

In the Dead or Alive Xtreme Beach Volleyball, Itagaki brought together the girls of Dead or Alive onto an island. The player is to foster good relationships between the girls to create a harmonious winning beach volleyball duo. In the second iteration of the series, the focus is shifted by expanding the number of activities the player can have the girls take part in. He explained the core of the game as a paradise where the player can watch the girls they 'love' enjoy simple activities. For Dead or Alive 4, he pushed back the release of the game in order to polish the game based on feedback of top Japanese Dead or Alive players recruited to playtest the game. He decided to exclude guns from the moveset of the Spartan named Nicole in Dead or Alive 4.

The Butt Battle, and Tug-of-War of Dead or Alive Xtreme 2 were heavily panned on the basis of minigame design. Itagaki defended those games as nostalgia comedic pieces, meant to make the player remember the celebrity games played on Japanese television. With Dead or Alive Xtreme 2, he chose to patch an easy-cash exploit rather than leaving it alone and ruminating over the consequences.

Ninja Gaiden (2004) was Itagaki's effort to develop a game centered on violent gameplay with super ninja Ryu Hayabusa as the protagonist. Capitalizing on the brand name of the earlier NES series, Itagaki developed a critically acclaimed action-adventure game for the Xbox. While working on Ninja Gaiden, he wanted to produce the "best and the ultimate action game" on the Xbox before moving on to the Xbox 360, which led to the production of the additional downloadable content Ninja Gaiden Black. He continued work on it to release an enhanced version, Ninja Gaiden Black. Tecmo appointed him as an executive officer in June 2004 and later assumed the position of general manager of the high-end production department in February 2006. In March 2008, he released Ninja Gaiden: Dragon Sword for the Nintendo DS. The move to a portable console was partly due to a promise made to his daughter.

Itagaki claimed to be one of the very few in the Japanese video game industry to establish communications with the Western world. He suggested other Japanese developers should do like-wise and be aware of the gaming tastes outside Japan, so as to be able to reverse the Japanese gaming industry slump of the mid-2000s.

He objected to the suggestion of Kasumi in the Ninja Gaiden universe, saying her "soft" nature conflicts with the "hard-edged" nature of the game, whereas Ayane perfectly fits in.

=== Lawsuit ===
In 2006, a female former Tecmo employee filed a sexual harassment suit against Itagaki. She claimed that Itagaki had made several unwanted sexual advances on her since 2003. While Itagaki admitted to kissing her, he claimed that whatever had gone between them had been consensual. Tecmo's ensuing investigation reached the conclusion that "the allegations in question were a result of the former employee's desire to vent frustration over her own personal affair, and not indicative of sexual harassment." Tecmo also demoted Itagaki and the accuser for their mingling of "personal affairs with their corporate responsibilities". In June 2007, a Tokyo district court found Itagaki innocent of the charges.

=== Departure from Tecmo and later projects ===
On June 2, 2008, just before the release of Ninja Gaiden II, Itagaki released a statement in which he announced that he was resigning from Tecmo and was suing the company for 148 million yen ($1.4 million) for withholding a bonus promised for his previous works. He was also suing Tecmo's new president Yoshimi Yasuda for damages based on "unreasonable and disingenuous statements" made in front of Itagaki's colleagues. Other lawsuits against Yasuda were filed with former Tecmo president Junji Nakamura and two plaintiffs on the behalf of 300 Tecmo employees suing for withholding executive retirement benefits amounting to 166 million yen and unpaid wages amounting to 8.3 million yen.

In a 2010 interview with 1up.com, Itagaki revealed that he was working on a project with former members of Team Ninja under a new studio, Valhalla Game Studios. The title in question, Devil's Third, was revealed shortly before E3 2010. In 2017, Itagaki announced he had become a special advisor to video game company Metal Soft. Valhalla effectively closed down in December 2021.

In January 2021, Itagaki announced that he had established a new game studio, Itagaki Games.

== Works ==
Year	Title	Role
1993	Captain Tsubasa 4	Graphic engineer
1993	Tecmo Super Bowl	Graphic engineer
1996	Dead or Alive	Producer and director
1999	Dead or Alive 2	Producer and director
2001	Dead or Alive 3	Producer and director
2003	Dead or Alive Xtreme Beach Volleyball	Producer and director
2004	Ninja Gaiden	Producer and director
2004	Dead or Alive Ultimate	Producer and director
2004	Fatal Frame II: Crimson Butterfly	Special adviser
2005	Ninja Gaiden Black	Producer and director
2005	Dead or Alive 4	Producer and director
2006	Dead or Alive Xtreme 2	Chief designer and software architect
2006	Super Swing Golf	Adviser
2008	Ninja Gaiden: Dragon Sword	Executive producer
2008	Ninja Gaiden II	Producer and director
2015	Devil's Third	Director
2020	Samurai Jack: Battle Through Time	Supreme advisor

== Design approach ==
=== Game design philosophy ===
Itagaki believed a good game should be an integrated product of good graphics, interactivity, and playability. He also placed a high priority on ensuring his games are interactive with the player's actions and respond quickly to the player's inputs. It was this belief which led to his criticism of Heavenly Sword. He found the payoff for the game's button-prompting sequences to be less fulfilling than that of Genji: Dawn of the Samurai, whose Kamui sequences he called dumb, but entertaining. Likewise, he cited Metal Gear Solid 2: Sons of Liberty and Final Fantasy X as games lacking the interactivity appealing to him.

Itagaki professed a liking for simplicity of inputs; he stated too many inputs would result in the loss of the gaming experience. As such, he respected Sega-AM2 for their work on Virtua Fighter 4, while maintaining his claim that Dead or Alive 3 is still a better game. Likewise, he deplored implementing scenarios to show off technology just for the sake of it, sarcastically asking what is the point of cutting down "thousand heads of cabbages on screen." In his integration mindset, everything (graphics, controllers, interactiveness, responsiveness, etc.) has its place, even CG pre-rendered cutscenes which he said can deliver a better cinematic experience of some scenes than doing them in real-time.

=== Opinions on hardware ===
As a game developer, Itagaki defined his philosophy as being able to extract the strengths of a game machine, and integrate them together to develop games to a level no one else can reach. He defined a game developer's satisfaction with a game machine as dependent upon these criteria. With this philosophy, he continually expressed happiness in developing on the Xbox 360, proclaiming it to be more "software friendly" than the PlayStation 3 and viewing it as the most powerful console on the market at the time. Furthermore, he admired Nintendo's dedication to innovation with the Wii, which he held in high regard for the "spirit of gaming."

Itagaki also spoke of his philosophy for handheld video game consoles, which focused on responsiveness and physical interaction instead of raw hardware power. As such, Itagaki refused to make a game for the PlayStation Portable (PSP), stating it went against the design philosophy of handheld devices. He believed that a game created based on the specifications of the PSP would be more suited for a home console.

=== Pet projects ===
Itagaki classified his projects into core projects (for business and technical excellence purposes), and those purely for self-fulfillment. The Dead or Alive Xtreme Beach Volleyball series and Dead or Alive: Code Chronos fall into the latter. According to Itagaki, the Volleyball games are just meant for simple fun, and to fulfill a "love" for the female characters, letting the player nurture and watch the girls partaking in simple joys. While he admitted to there being sexual content in the game, Itagaki refused to create scenarios which he felt were vulgar for his "daughters", a term he used to refer to his female characters. Code Chronos falls into the same category of development, developed as Itagaki's hobby for style.

=== Frank personality ===
Itagaki valued frank and "to the point" attitudes, believing anything else would allow "quibbles and sectionalists" to come in and derail the train of thought. His frank attitude was also in line with his admitted aggression. This related to his desire for challenges, producing games like Ninja Gaiden which are acknowledged as "hard" by the gaming industry, and to push himself to produce games which can contend as the best games of the genre. He openly claimed to be the sole creative force behind his projects, as well as being able to convey his plan clearly for the team to understand. He bemoaned that the Japanese are starting to forget the basic concepts, closing off their minds to outside criticisms.

Itagaki consistently gave harsh opinions on Namco's Tekken games, mainly due to his grudge against the company for its insulting radio commercial on his Dead or Alive game. He stated he never forgot an insult to his family, and would retaliate with "nuclear missiles more than 100 times for that". This along with what he viewed as Tekken's stagnation in the fighting game genre (starting from Tekken 4), led him to condemn the Tekken series, placing it as his top five hated games, in spite of him stating Tekken, Tekken 2, and Tekken 3 were good games which his family enjoyed. In 2025, series director Katsuhiro Harada revealed that Itagaki had apologised privately to Namco Bandai in 2008, saying he had respected Tekken and its staff, and that his aggressive language was part of a strategy to draw media attention, especially from Western gaming outlets.

== Personal life, death and legacy ==
Itagaki was married and had a daughter, whom he has mentioned as one of the primary influences on his projects and a constant gaming partner in games like the Halo series. Itagaki had in his office a set of katana his father made for him, which he tended to take out to show to his visitors. As he wished to stop people from reading his expressions during gambling-type games, he was always seen wearing sunglasses, a habit that became his trademark in the video game community.

On October 16, 2025, Itagaki's family posted news of his death through a pre-written message on his Facebook account. He was 58 and, according to his close friend James Mielke, had been suffering from a serious illness in his final days. Team Ninja acknowledged his death and offered condolences on social media, together with industry veterans such as Tekken producer Katsuhiro Harada. Others, such as Super Smash Bros. director Masahiro Sakurai wrote separate tributes. Harada and general manager of Koei Tecmo's entertainment division, Yosuke Hayashi, were amongst the attendees who were Itagaki's memorial service held on November 27, 2025, and delivered eulogies.
