= Dead or Alive: Dimensions =

2011 video game

- European cover art
- Developer: Team Ninja
- Publisher: Tecmo Koei
- Directors: Yosuke Hayashi; Yohei Shimbori
- Producers: Yosuke Hayashi; Kohei Shibata
- Designers: Toshihiko Kodama; Takeshi Ōmori
- Series: Dead or Alive
- Platform: Nintendo 3DS
- Release: May 19, 2011: JP: May 19, 2011; EU: May 20, 2011; NA: May 24, 2011; AU: May 26, 2011
- Genre: Fighting
- Modes: Single player, multiplayer

Dead or Alive: Dimensions (Note: Japanese: DEAD OR ALIVE Dimensions(デッド オア アライブ ディメンションズ), Hepburn: Deddo oa Araibu Dimenshonzu; also known as DOA Dimensions or DOAD) is a 2011 fighting game developed by Team Ninja and published by Tecmo Koei for the Nintendo 3DS. It is considered a compilation game rather than a truly new entry in the Dead or Alive series, similar to the likes of Tekken Tag Tournament; it offers 26 playable fighters, more than any previous installment in the franchise, and uses a modified engine of Dead or Alive 4. Its plot compiles the stories of the previous four main DOA games with additional details, focusing on Kasumi for 1, Ryu Hayabusa for 2, Ayane for 3, and Helena Douglas for 4.

Originally released on May 19, 2011, it was the first DOA game to be released on a Nintendo console, the first DOA fighting game released on a handheld, and most notably, the first released without any involvement from series creator Tomonobu Itagaki. Dimensions makes use of the console's unique features and capabilities, and these were well received by critics.

== Gameplay ==
Gameplay on an Aqua Blue 3DS

In Dead or Alive Dimensions, the action is displayed on the top screen of the Nintendo 3DS, while the special fighting moves are displayed on the touch screen below. DOAD incorporates a Chronicle Mode feature, which acts as a story mode in the game, going through all four Dead or Alive tournaments as the player assumes the roles of various fighters from the series. The other modes featured are Arcade (in which the player fights for additional time), Survival (in which the player fights until he defeats all opponents or is knocked out), Free Play, Training, Showcase (in which the player position 3D models on a stage and takes 3D photos of them), and 3D Photo Album (in which the player views the photos taken in Showcase mode).

The game's stages are mostly taken from Dead or Alive 3 and Dead or Alive 4. The substantial new content in the game are the Freedom Survivor stage and the inclusion of a stage based on Metroid: Other M – an installment in Nintendo's Metroid series co-developed by Team Ninja – with characters from that game appearing as stage hazards (but not playable fighters). The characters Kasumi Alpha, Genra, and Alpha-152 who were boss characters in the previous games are made playable for the first time as unlockable characters. Shiden, who first appeared in Dead or Alive Ultimate, makes his first playable appearance as an unlockable boss character.

The 3DS's touch screen is used to make the characters execute special fighting moves, while the top screen is used for displaying the fight, in a similar fashion to Super Street Fighter IV: 3D Edition. Dimensions supports in-game frame data that can be displayed on the bottom screen during Training Mode. Dimensions also uses the 3DS' StreetPass feature to make AI representations of the player, based on their play patterns, that can challenge other owners of the game in the Throwdown mode. Dimensions offers a framerate of 60 frames per second with the console's 3D feature turned off. With it turned on, however, the imagery is divided by two for the players individual eyes (30 frames per second to each eye).

== Characters ==
Dimensions features a roster of 26 playable characters, including an original character created for the game, Shiden. The list of characters is given below, with unlockable characters marked with an asterisk.

- Alpha-152*
- Ayane
- Bass Armstrong
- Bayman
- Brad Wong
- Christie
- Ein
- Eliot
- Gen Fu
- Genra*
- Hayate
- Helena Douglas
- Hitomi
- Jann Lee
- Kasumi
- Kasumi Alpha*
- Kokoro
- Leifang
- Leon
- La Mariposa
- Raidou*
- Ryu Hayabusa
- Shiden*
- Tengu*
- Tina Armstrong
- Zack

Outside of the playable characters, Ridley from the Metroid series appears as a stage hazard in the "Geothermal Power Plant" stage, while Metroid protagonist Samus Aran makes a cameo appearance in the stage to help the fighters.

== Plot ==
Dead or Alive: Dimensions plot spans the first four main games in the Dead or Alive series, which also unfold the hidden truth within its stories.

In the prologue, set before the first game, Kasumi is confronted by her father, the 17th and current leader of the Mugen Tenshin Ninja Clan, Shiden, about her skills as he plans to make her his next heir. Originally, Kasumi's brother and Shiden's eldest child, Hayate, was destined to be Shiden's next heir, but sometime ago, Kasumi's uncle, the exiled ninja Raidou, attacked the village, beating her half-sister Ayane and defeating her brother Hayate. As a result, Hayate was crippled and fell into a coma. Upon learning this, Kasumi decided to run away from the village to take revenge on Raidou for Hayate, even though it meant she would be a fugitive and likely to be killed by her own clan since leaving without permission is against the ninja code. Kasumi is quickly stopped by Ayane, who was ordered by her foster-father Genra to track her down and kill her, but a woman named Christie appears in a helicopter and saves Kasumi. Although Kasumi did not know the woman, she went with Christie to safety. Heading towards Helena Douglas' cruise ship "Freedom Survivor", Kasumi is introduced to both Christie and Bayman and is told about the "DOA tournament", with Raidou being there. Kasumi encounters Ayane, now a contestant, and both meet Raidou with Fame Douglas, the founder and head of the Dead or Alive Tournament Executive Committee (DOATEC). After Kasumi fights her way and manages to reach the final round, she faces against Raidou and defeats him, but then he reawakens more powerful than before. Kasumi uses her magic against him, and with a little help from fellow ninja, Ryu Hayabusa, she finally kills Raidou. However, she gets kidnapped by DOATEC, which prompts Ryu to save her. That same night, Fame Douglas is assassinated by Bayman with a sniper rifle under the orders of DOATEC's scientist, Victor Donovan, who desires to gain control of the committee to perform genetic projects. Although Bayman is successful in Douglas' assassination, Christie leaves Bayman behind as she returns to DOATEC headquarters.

Hayate, still in a coma, is abducted from the village by Kasumi Alpha, an evil clone of Kasumi created by the DOATEC Super-human Development Project. Ayane is told by Genra about the return of Tengu and sent to search for Ryu in Europe. After the death of Helena's father Fame, and then later her mother Maria, Helena appears on Freedom Survivor and takes over the Dead or Alive Tournament Executive Committee. To everyone on board the cruise ship, she announces the "second DOA tournament", with herself participating as a competitor, determined to find the truth about the murder of her parents. Aboard Freedom Survivor, Ryu is approached by a woman named Lisa Hamilton. During Lisa's phone call with Victor Donovan, Ryu overhears that Kasumi is in the DOATEC Germany facility. Ryu's friend, Irene Lew, arrives in a helicopter, and they both head to the facility. In DOATEC's facility in Germany, where Kasumi is indeed being held, Alpha sneaks Kasumi out of her cell and reveals that Hayate is also in the facility. As the facility burns down, Ryu saves Kasumi and takes her to safety, while Lisa and Alpha make their escape with Hayate and place him in one of the helicopters, which gets hit and crashes. In the forest, Ryu and Irene learn that Hayate was experimented on in genetics research in the facility and Kasumi runs off to find him. In another part of the forest, a karateka named Hitomi is training when Hayate, who survived the crash, stumbles into her and collapses. Hitomi then offers to help the unconscious Hayate. Sometime later, as Ryu battles his way through the tournament, he tries to warn competitor, Jann Lee, and other competitors of the dangers of the tournament but finds them unwilling to back down, so he proceeds to knock them out of the tournament. Ryu encounters Hayate, who is now going by the name of "Ein" and suffering from amnesia. Ryu defeats him and restores some parts of his memory. Afterwards, Ryu tracks down Tengu and kills him. Ein arrives at Miyama and tries to remember why he knows the place. After defeating Kasumi in battle and knocking her out, Hayate regained his memories, but Genra reveals that he allowed Tengu to pass into the human world and escapes, leaving a brainwashed Ayane and Kasumi Alpha to fight Ryu and Hayate. Ryu, along with Irene, explain to Hayate that Genra may have been involved with DOATEC, and although Ayane returns to normal, both Kasumi and Alpha disappear.

During the "third tournament", Helena hires Bayman to protect her and kill Donovan. Bayman accepted the offer as he also desires to kill Donovan for his attempt to assassinate him. Christie, posing as Helena's assistant, attempts to assassinate her but is caught and restrained by Bayman. Alpha over-hears that Helena wants Donovan dead and attacks her, but Helena manages to defeat her. With Genra turned traitor, Hayate requests to his father that he should hunt him down, making Shiden believe Hayate is ready to take over as the next leader of their clan instead of Kasumi. Hayate wants to bring Kasumi home first, but Ayane speaks against it, calling Kasumi a traitor, which enrages Hayate and makes him slap her. Thinking that Hayate now hates her, Ayane attempts suicide, but is found by her mother, Ayame. Ayane is upset believing Hayate only cares about Kasumi, but Ayame reminded her that all four of them are family and asks Ayane to save Kasumi rather than be her enemy as Ayame believes their family's bonds are stronger than the ninja code. Hayate and Ayane join the third tournament to track down Genra. Kasumi spends some time in the geisha district of Kyoto during her running and disguised herself as a normal high school girl and civilian to get by. She developed a fever and passes out on the road. She is found by local maiko, Kokoro, who offered to help her, but Kasumi refuses. Upon seeing Ayane from a distance, Kasumi panics and flees. Ayane ask Kokoro where the girl fled to, but Kokoro quickly caught on to Kasumi's fright and refused to tell Ayane. Ayane then tried to beat the information out of Kokoro. Hayate arrives shortly after their fight, and Ayane informs him that she saw Kasumi while Kokoro fled the scene. While on Freedom Survivor, Hayate meets up with Hitomi again since his departure from her father's dojo when he was Ein, and Hayate tells Hitomi the truth about his and Ayane's ninja identities, much to Hitomi's surprise. Later, Hayate and Ayane come across xinyi liuhequan master Gen Fu, who is giving his apprentice, Eliot, rigorous training. Gen Fu then asks the two ninjas for a friendly tag duel so that his apprentice can experience different fighting styles. After the fight, Eliot proclaims that he is still inexperienced and not yet ready to succeed Gen Fu as xingyi master. An annoyed Ayane slaps Eliot and tells him to stop putting himself down and toughen up. Eliot thanks her for the advice and they all hope that they can meet each other again. Sometime later, while Hayate and Hitomi were training in Freedom Survivor, they were interrupted by competitor Leifang's crash by Jann Lee. Hitomi steps in to defend Leifang from Jann Lee, but Leifang tells Hitomi to stay out of it therefore starting their rivalry. Jann Lee thinks Hayate is a worthy competitor and asks him for a fight. Sometime later, Hayate meets with Helena, who recognizes him as the subject of Project Epsilon. Hayate demands her to tell him why Genra joined DOATEC, but she claimed she does not know and both Genra and herself are just puppets of DOATEC. After defeating Helena in battle, he tells her that she should leave DOATEC for her own safety. Later, Hayate and Ayane meet up with Ryu and Irene, but Irene gets kidnapped by Christie. Ryu runs off to save her, while Hayate and Ayane are confronted by Genra, who acquired a transformation into his Omega form. When Ryu realizes that Christie was just a decoy, he returns to aid them, and runs Omega-powered Genra through with his Dragon Sword, giving time for Ayane and Hayate to perform a duel magic attack that strikes Genra before he could regenerate, killing him. When they return to the village, Ayane watches Genra's body cremated as she walks away in tears.

After Helena became head leader of DOATEC, Donovan discusses with her the biological weapon cloning project, Project Alpha. With the "fourth tournament" on the way, Hayate and the forces of the Mugen Tenshin clan are planning an assault on DOATEC's main headquarters, the Tri-Tower. Fearing the worst, Kasumi finds her brother and tries to convince him not to start a war, but the plea falls on deaf ears. One night, Hayate, Ayane, and Ryu attacks the Tri-Tower with Irene and the CIA aiding them. Inside the tower, Ayane and Ryu are intercepted by Christie. Ayane engages Christie in combat while Ryu tries to regroup with Hayate. At the same time, Kasumi infiltrates the Tri-Tower and confronts Helena, pleading with her to stop the war, but Helena replied that the ninjas would stop at nothing to destroy DOATEC, and the final product of Project Alpha, Alpha-152. Helena attempts to shoot Kasumi with a handgun, but she is saved by Ryu. Hayate is approached by Lisa Hamilton, now a luchadora going by her ring name "La Mariposa". She reveals that she had something to do with his vendetta against DOATEC. Hayate merely replied that she had done him a favor and repaid her with a fight. Afterwards, Hayate meets with Hitomi again, who pleaded for him to come back with him to the dojo. Hayate told her that he could not, and the fourth tournament was no tournament at all, but a war between DOATEC and his people. He then asked her to spar for a warm-up, for old time's sake, which she happily accepted. After the fight, they told each other to take care before Hitomi departs. While Kasumi makes her way to fight an awakened Alpha-152, Hayate and Ayane use their magic to destroy the Tri-Tower, only to have to face Alpha-152 themselves. With the Tri-Tower in flames, Helena faces Christie one last time, and learns that it was actually her who killed her mother Maria. After finding out the truth, Helena sets off the building's self-destruction and plans to end her own life, with Kasumi and Ayane helplessly watching from afar. However, she is suddenly saved by Zack, who sweeps in by helicopter and pulls her to safety. The final scene shows Donovan taking off his white mask, and putting on Genra's mask.

== Development and release ==
Dead or Alive: Dimensions promo booth at Nintendo World 2011

Dead or Alive: Dimensions was first revealed as an official title on June 15, 2010, at E3 under the working title Dead or Alive 3D. Dimensions is the fourth Dead or Alive game to feature English voice overs; most of voice actors have been recast. Yosuke Hayashi took over as the director and producer following the departure of the series' creator Tomonobu Itagaki.

Dimensions was scheduled for release as a launch title for the Nintendo 3DS on February 26, 2011. However, due to the 2011 Tōhoku earthquake and tsunami of March 11, the release was pushed back by two months. It was eventually released on May 19 in Japan, on May 20 in Europe, on May 24 in North America, and on May 26 in Australia. Nintendo distributed the game in PAL regions. It was also the first game in the series to have a "Teen" rating from the ESRB since 2001's Dead or Alive 3 by toning down the sexual content for female characters.

On December 7, 2011, a demo version of Dimensions was made available on the Nintendo eShop for free download. It is a very limited version of the game, as the player will only have access to Arcade Mode and some parts of Chronicle Mode, and the demo will expire after 30 sessions. In the demo, players can only select from Jann Lee, Kasumi, Hayabusa, and Hitomi. It is possible to fight against, but not as, Ayane.

=== Controversy ===
To avoid possible legal issues, Nintendo's long time Scandinavian distributor Bergsala decided against releasing Dead or Alive: Dimensions in Sweden, Norway, and Denmark. The concerns were raised when an internet forum user commented that three underage characters in the game could be viewed from angles that could be considered lascivious.

Concerns in relation to the game also rose in Australia, when certain media outlets criticized the PG rating for the game. After careful consideration, the Australian Classification Board came to the conclusion that it was not given sufficient information at the time to give it a correct classification. The game's PG rating was subsequently revoked. Nintendo has then resubmitted the game with a more detailed analysis of the game's content. The game was subsequently given the next rating after PG, the M rating, which allows any age to still purchase the game, but is recommended for more mature audiences.

== Reception ==
Reception

Aggregate scores
Aggregator	Score
GameRankings	82.02%
Metacritic	79/100

Review scores
Publication	Score
Electronic Gaming Monthly	7.5/10
Famitsu	36/40
GamesRadar+	9/10
IGN	8.0/10
Nintendo Power	9.0/10
VideoGamer.com	7/10

Dead or Alive: Dimensions received "generally favorable reviews", according to review aggregator Metacritic. It earned an aggregated score of 82.02% from GameRankings. In Japan, Famitsu gave it a score of 36 out of 40.

Nintendo Power review praised the "top-notch" cutscenes and the "fast and furious as ever" gameplay, but warned against the 3D effect, as well as having problems with the Tag Mode feature. According to VideoGamer.com, "the Street Pass feature is nice and the controls work well, but the framerate suffers online, and the Chronicle Mode is a narrative mess." GameZone opined that "loads of modes, plenty of unlockable extra goodies, and a very functional multiplayer make Dimensions a series that not only fans must buy, but any gamer with even the slightest itch for a quality portable fighting game. If you’ve been waiting for the next must-buy 3DS title, this is it, folks."

On November 11, 2011, Tecmo Koei released materials from its earnings presentation, showing that Dead or Alive: Dimensions had sold 310,000 units worldwide.
