= Raidou =

Raidou may refer to:

- Raidou (Dead or Alive), a character of Dead or Alive series and the main antagonist of the first and sixth game
- Raidou Kuzunoha XIV, the protagonist of Devil Summoner: Raidou Kuzunoha series, the spin-off of Shin Megami Tensei franchises
