= Kasumi (Dead or Alive) =

Dead or Alive character

- Dead or Alive and Ninja Gaiden character
- Kasumi in Dead or Alive 5 (2012)
- First game: Dead or Alive (1996)
- Created by: Tomonobu Itagaki
- Designed by: Tomonobu Itagaki; Yukata Saito (DOA6); Yohei Shimbori (DOA6)
- Voiced by: English: Kari Wahlgren (DOAX2–Dimensions); Lauren Landa (DOA5–present); Japanese: Sakura Tange (DOA1-DOA2); Houko Kuwashima (DOA3-present)
- Portrayed by: Devon Aoki (film)

In-universe information
- Fighting style: Mugen Tenshin Ninjutsu (Tenjin Mon style)
- Origin: Japan
- Nationality: Japanese

Kasumi (Japanese: かすみ) is the protagonist of the Dead or Alive fighting game series by Team Ninja and Tecmo (Koei Tecmo). She was a main character in the first, second, and fifth games and in the film adaptation, DOA: Dead or Alive.

In the games' canon, Kasumi, also known as "The Kunoichi of Destiny", is a teenage ninja princess of the Mugen Tenshin Ninja Clan. Kasumi abandoned her clan, becoming an outcast and is pursued by her younger half-sister, Ayane. Throughout the series, there have been several boss characters who are clones of her. She also guest appeared in various other games, including Team Ninja's other flagship series, Ninja Gaiden, where she and Ayane play much bigger roles, as well as Warriors Orochi 3 Ultimate and Warriors All-Stars as part of their playable roster.

Kasumi has become a symbol of the Dead or Alive franchise and is the personal favorite of Team Ninja's founder and the series' creator, Tomonobu Itagaki. She has been the subject of various merchandise and was also used to promote Xbox consoles in Japan. Kasumi is a popular sex symbol in video game culture and an iconic ninja character. Due to differences in cultural norms, she has attracted some controversy in the West involving eroticism and the use of underage female characters in video games.

== Conception and design ==
When developing the fighting game Dead or Alive for Koei Tecmo, Team Ninja considered several design concepts. Lead developer Tomonobu Itagaki wanted to emphasize character expression, taking inspiration from the wrestling group nWo. Tomonobu Itagaki originally envisioned the character to be male, before changing her gender. As Kasumi became more and more kawaii, he decided to make her the lead character. The rest of his team was only half-convinced at first but warmed up to the idea eventually. Her primary outfit was designed to keep "in mind of materials available to cosplayers at the time"

Kasumi stands 158 centimetres (5 ft 2 in) and has three-sizes of 89-54-85 cm (35-21-33 in). She is usually wearing a wakizashi in a small of her back. Her hair has been variously blonde, auburn and red, with hairstyle options including a ponytail, a braid, and loose hair. She wears many types of costumes through the series, including female ninja outfits, feminine casual clothes, Japanese schoolgirl uniforms, and bikinis. Commonly, her default (and sometimes only, in most of her guest appearances) costume has been her blue-and-white "Brilliant Lapis" (originally white-and-red, later known as "Immaculate White"), made of a revealing and puff-sleeved Japanese tunic (later with swan-themed ornaments), a sash, thigh-high tabi, sandals with shin guards, hand guards with metal wristbands, and a choker. According to IGN, she had the best outfits of the characters in Dead or Alive Ultimate—the expanded compilation of the first two DOA games—in which "she looks great and her outfits are fantastic." A planned new main costume for Kasumi in Dead or Alive: Dimensions upset some fans when the game was announced in 2010.

She was the youngest character in the original version of the first game. Itagaki said his "daughter" Kasumi "has been a main character of the Dead or Alive series, and please understand, she is like a Venus to me." When asked if he was comfortable with sexualizing a 17-year-old character, Itagaki answered, "In Japan, that's okay. Maybe it's 20 in America." He said, "I was 27 when I created Kasumi. I'm older now, but 17-year-old girls are still gorgeous." Itagaki said the Dead or Alive series contributed its character Ayane, rather than the "very soft" Kasumi, for a cameo appearance in 2004's Ninja Gaiden because Kasumi did not fit with the game's "very hard-edged" basis as "DOA is based on a 'softer' concept, and she is rather symbolic of the game as a whole". He said that if Ninja Gaiden had featured Kasumi, it would have become less a "story of [Ryu] Hayabusa and ninjas" and more a story of Kasumi ("Kasumi-den") and a "DOA action game". Itagaki has described himself as personally "a fan of Kasumi" as his favorite DOA character. He also said he felt "responsible for her" and was "very close to her". When hackers found a way to remove her clothing in DOA2, Itagaki felt this "was an attack on her". Tecmo's lawyers sued software company West Side, the authors of the hack, for violating copyright, and won the case and damages of two million yen (over US$20,000). Kasumi's nude model can be also accessed using a GameShark cheat device in the Dreamcast version of DOA2, and one fan-made mod for DOA5 modified her training suit to remove most of the clothing.

For Dead or Alive 5, Kasumi was redesigned with an emphasis to look more "grown up". The game's art director Yuta Saito said, "From DOA4 we wanted to evolve the characters in a slightly realistic direction. The most difficult, and you don't have to ask, is Kasumi. Kasumi is the face of DOA and the eternal heroine. And for such a popular character like Kasumi, to change her form we really needed a lot of courage and it really was a big challenge. But if we didn't do that, we couldn't make DOA5 and we wouldn't be able to show you anything." Producer Yasuke Hayashi said the process of remodeling Kasumi has sparked most disputes in the development team, especially since she is "a character that is not so much out on the table, with hidden feelings, and it's been difficult to express such a 'hidden look'." GamesRadar+ noted that "the manga influences on her facial features—while still apparent—have been scaled right back [a]nd her boobs seem less ludicrously unmanageable."

In Dead or Alive 6, her appearance was overseen by game director Yohei Shimbori and art director Yukata Saito. Shimbori stated he was nervous on what costume to give her, as she was considered the face of the franchise. As he felt "times had changed" at that point in gaming, he chose to give her a more heroic image, though assured fans that her original outfit would still be present in the game as an option. She went through multiple revisions during development, aiming for a design that combined "a dignified design that combines the coolness of a ninja with a beautiful feminine silhouette", while incorporating cherry blossom shapes into her attire. By the end, her default outfit was changed to an armored "full-body skin-tight catsuit with combat heels" that featured a black and blue color scheme.

== Appearances ==
=== In video games ===
Kasumi was introduced in the 1996 fighting video game Dead or Alive by Koei Tecmo, and alongside her brother Hayate is one of heirs apparent of their ninja clan. However after Hayate is seriously injured by series villain Raidou, she abandons her position to fight and kill him at the game's fighting tournament. Now an outcast, she is pursued by her half sister Ayane. Despite being victorious, she is captured and experimented on by the company DOATEC, which produces several clones of her she fights through the series. After she escapes, she reunites with her now-amnesiac brother. Kasumi helps him to recover his memories and restores him to the head of the ninja clan, though she remains an outcast. Living as a hermit in the mountains, in Dead or Alive 6 she fights alongside Ayane and Hayate to defeat a revived Raidou.

Kasumi appears in the 2003 sports video game Dead or Alive Xtreme Beach Volleyball (DOAX). There, Kasumi is invited to a fourth DOA tournament; upon arriving she discovers the invitation is a hoax, and she and the game's other characters play beach volleyball. Kasumi also appears in the sequel, Dead or Alive Xtreme 2 (2006), and in the portable version Dead or Alive Paradise (2010). She is one of the first nine playable female characters in Dead or Alive Xtreme 3 (2015). In this case, Kasumi, while reading her fortune, returns once again to New Zack Island, and she decides to spend some time in order to find of about her fortune. In mobile game The Girls of Dead or Alive: Blackjack (2009), Kasumi makes a non-player appearance as blackjack dealer.

Dead or Alive: Code Chronos, a DOA series' prequel game which was to star Kasumi and Ayane in the leading roles. Itagaki said in 2003, "the fact that we registered this trademark for Kasumi-den should tell you that we have a big plan for it." Code Chronos was cancelled following Itagaki's departure from Tecmo

In the Ninja Gaiden series, Kasumi first made a cameo appearance at the end of 2009's Ninja Gaiden Sigma 2. Kasumi appears as a playable character in the 2012 action game Ninja Gaiden 3: Razor's Edge, which was made available as free DLC for the Wii U, and was included in the PlayStation 3 and Xbox 360 versions. In it, she is armed with a long sword and kunai throwing knives and by default wears hooded black armor with a cape-like blue scarf; the player can also select three of her costumes from DOA5. In 2013, Kasumi was featured in the smart phone action card game Hyakuman-nin no Ninja Gaiden, in which Hitomi from Dead or Alive and Rio from Rio: Rainbow Gate! also appear dressed in Kasumi's DOA costumes.

Kasumi appears as an optionally playable 'monster' in the games Monster Rancher 2 (1999) and Monster Rancher 4 (2003). Kasumi also appears as a playable character in a minor role in Warriors Orochi 3 Ultimate (Musou Orochi 3 Ultimate, 2013). She is a playable character in the crossover crowd-fighting game Warriors All-Stars (Musou Stars, 2017) in a larger role, including appearing on the game's cover art.

Her classic blue ninja getup is an unlockable costume for Arin in Super Swing Golf, and is an alternative costume of Mio Amakura in the Director's Cut version of Fatal Frame II: Crimson Butterfly for the Xbox (2004). It is also available for character avatars in Koei's social game My GAMECITY and in Sega's Phantasy Star Online 2 (added in 2017), as well as for player characters in Game Arts' Ragnarok Odyssey Ace (2013) and for Senran Kagura's Asuka in Shinobi Master Senran Kagura: New Link (a 2018 collaboration). Sega's free-to-play game Samurai & Dragons added a rare Kasumi card in 2013. Kasumi also appeared as a playable guest character in Netmarble/SNK's The King of Fighters All Star (a 2021 collaboration).

=== In other media ===
Kasumi appeared as a lead character in the 2006 action-comedy film DOA: Dead or Alive, which is loosely based on the game series. In it, she was played by Devon Aoki, an American actress of mixed ethnicity who has previously portrayed the ninja Miho in the film Sin City. Itagaki later expressed a preference for a Japanese actress, ideally Kumiko Gotoh, but had no authority over the casting process. According to Aoki, she was asked to go the film's casting interview by her 15-year-old brother. She played the game for the first time, after which she understood why Kasumi is so popular. Aoki said about Kasumi in the film: "Yes, she's pretty badass ... and she's a princess. She's never been outside the palace walls. She's been very, very sheltered, because she's a princess and that's the way it is ... until the point where she actually decides to leave, she's basically been pretty sheltered but she's a capable fighter."

According to Kung Fu Tai Chi, DOA: Dead or Alive "focuses its pugilistic mayhem on the eye-candy surrounding the mythos of Princess Kasumi". In the movie, Kasumi escapes her clan and joins the tournament upon receiving an invitation. She fights against Leon and wins. Later, Kasumi stabs the villain Victor Donovan with an acupuncture needle. He is paralyzed and perishes in an explosion. In the end, she goes home with her brother despite being a runaway shinobi, but has to fight against her clan with her new friends to be allowed to stay.

In print media, Kasumi appears in several stories in the gag comic series Dead or Alive 2 Comic Anthology by DNA Media Comics. She was also featured in a gamebook for the ecchi series Queen's Blade, which utilized a stylized version of her original design. Meanwhile, a picture book titled Dead or Alive Side A: Love! Kasumi was produced and sold in Japan, featuring images and poses of the character as seen in the Xtreme series.

== Promotion and merchandise ==
Kasumi has been featured in a wide range of merchandise, including figurines, statuettes and action figures that have been released by companies such as Sega, Kaiyodo, Max Factory, Kotobukiya, Takara, Griffin Enterprise, and Koei Tecmo themselves. One figure was bundled with a special edition of Dead or Alive Paradise for the PlayStation Portable (also sold separately); another exclusive figure was bundled with the magazine Hobby Japan in 2010. Some Kasumi figures can be stripped down to their underwear or stripped topless.

Other items include an Xbox 360 face plate, a PSP protective cover, swimwear for women, wall scrolls, 3D mousepads and a "3D" mug, trading cards, a Xbox controller, and a "squishy pillow". A life-size 160-centimetre (5.2-foot) dakimakura "love pillow" was bundled by Microsoft with the 5,000-unit "Kasumi-chan Blue" limited edition batch of the Xbox consoles sold in Japan a bed sheet of Kasumi and Ayane was offered as part of the Deluxe Edition of Dead or Alive 6 in Japan. Kasumi and Hitomi were also used in an iPhone digital clock application Bijin Tokei, and a Dead or Alive voice clock was bundled with a figure of either Kasumi or Ayane. Kasumi-themed credit cards were also released, while a 1/6 scale special limited figure was released in only 20 copies as part of the film's promotional campaign.

Dead or Alive 5 pre-order bonuses included an exclusive Kasumi-themed iPhone case from the online retailer ShopTo.Net. Merchandise released for DOA5 include another Kasumi-themed 3D mousepad and body pillow cases. Kasumi was featured on the covers of Dead or Alive 5 Postcard School Calendar 2013 and on 2005's comic anthology companion for Dead or Alive Ultimate. Dead or Alive 5 Ultimate "Kasumi-chan Blue" limited edition includes Kasumi-themed 3D mousepad, playing cards, lifesize tapestry and bath poster; the game's collector's edition also contains a Kasumi 3D mousepad and playing cards. There is also a life-size 3D mousepad of Kasumi from DOA Xtreme 3.

First-print copies of Tecmo Koei's Musou Orochi 2 Ultimate (Japanese version of Warriors Orochi 3 Ultimate) were bundled with DLC costume codes for Kasumi's special "Orochi" themed costume in DOA5 Ultimate.

Another Kasumi figure was released for her Queen's Gate appearance.

== Critical reception ==
Kasumi was well received upon her debut. Brian Ashcraft of Kotaku called her one of the most iconic characters in Japanese gaming, praising how cosplayers leaned into the character's strengths and how instantly recognizable her outfit had become, further calling her the face of the franchise and stating "She isn't merely in Dead or Alive; she is Dead or Alive." The staff of Wirtualna Polska meanwhile stated she has "become almost a legend, becoming one of the most iconic heroines not only in games, but also in pop culture in general", noting the large amount of merchandise and memorability regarding the character. She has also been cited her as a popular subject for cosplay, with Everybody Cosplay! author Jan Kurotaki voicing her approval for the "cool, really flashy costume that gets you a lot of attention!"

Princess Weekes of The Mary Sue stated that while "her conception was filled with ecchi ideas", she enjoyed how Kasumi evolved as a character during the course of the series. Calling her a sex symbol, she appreciated that the character's redesign in Dead or Alive 6 was her favorite, "providing full coverage, but the tight design of it still looks sexy". In another article she cited Kasumi as an example of a "badass wish-fulfillment" character she felt women often enjoyed playing as a form of power fantasy. Manga artist Kōsuke Fujishima praised how she represented the series as a protagonist, finding it "refreshing" to see in the fighting game genre. He additionally enjoyed that her movements were "expressed in a feminine manner", noting that it was a rarity in the time of Dead or Alive 2's release.

James Hawkins of Joystick Division stated that while all the female characters of Dead or Alive were sexy, "there is something [...] about Kasumi that the other characters in the series seem to be missing", citing her compassionate character and "appealing vulnerability in the way she carries herself", but also how her character seemed more realistically proportioned compared to other members of the cast. The staff of Games.sina.com.cn it was "extremely easy to be intoxicated" by her "quiet and delicate appearance", and felt this along with her temperament made her extremely popular with male and female players. Kurt Kalata of Hardcore Gaming 101 on the other hand criticized her as an "insufferable Mary Sue," particularly in Dimensions and cited her as an example of poor writing in the series. The staff of Kakuchopurei noted that while she was an important character to and often the driving force of the Dead or Alive series, they disliked her lack of personality and that her only perceived motivation seemed to be due to her role as the series protagonist, stating "That’s a goal, not a character trait."

Kasumi's character design and its sexualization have been discussed in various publications. The book Data Made Flesh cited her as an example of how video game characters tend to lean towards a "hyperreal" depiction that aimed to create "a unique aesthetic for perfection". Matt Cundy of GamesRadar+ meanwhile praised how she was changed aesthetically for Dead or Alive 5, citing how the "manga influences" in her face were present but reduced, and particularly noted her breasts were shown as more manageable compared to previous incarnations. While he called her outfit "a questionable state of undress", he stated "at least she looks more tasteful while doing it. So that's definitely probably more mature." Emanuel Maiberg of Vice voiced approval for her redesign in Dead or Alive 6, citing it as an example of how the game series could be seen as "growing up".

Kasumi has also been the subject of various third-party productions, many of which erotic media such as hentai doujins and machinima, the latter of which has been the subject of academic discussion regarding the treatment of women in such media. Meanwhile, Japanese company Thrust released an unlicensed pornographic film of the character titled "Kazumi" in 2007. Also in 2007, Doujin company C-Cube released an unofficial "breast stimulation" erotic soundtrack CD using the character's likeness in Akihabara stores. Kasumi's popularity also led to a large amount of poor quality bootleg figurines in Japan, to the extent shop owners would post comparison pictures to help shoppers identify them.

== See also ==
- Ninja in popular culture
