= Dead or Alive 2 =

1999 fighting video game

- North American Dreamcast cover art featuring Ein (center), Kasumi (left), and Tina (right)
- Developer: Team Ninja
- Publishers: Tecmo: EU: Acclaim Entertainment (DC); EU: Sony Computer Entertainment (PS2)
- Director: Tomonobu Itagaki
- Producers: Tomonobu Itagaki; Yasushi Maeda
- Designers: Hiroaki Matsui; Katsunori Ehara
- Programmers: Takeshi Kawaguchi; Hiroaki Ozawa
- Composer: Makoto Hosoi
- Series: Dead or Alive
- Platforms: Arcade, Dreamcast, PlayStation 2
- Release: October 16, 1999: Arcade; JP: October 16, 1999; JP: January 18, 2000 (Millennium); NA/EU: 2000 (Millennium) Dreamcast; NA: February 29, 2000; EU: April 28, 2000; JP: September 28, 2000 (Limited Edition) PlayStation 2; JP: March 30, 2000; NA: October 26, 2000 (Hardcore); JP: December 14, 2000 (Hard*Core); EU: December 15, 2000 (Hardcore)
- Genre: Fighting
- Modes: Single-player, multiplayer
- Arcade system: Sega NAOMI

Dead or Alive 2 (Note: Japanese: DEAD OR ALIVE(デッドオアアライブ) 2, Hepburn: Deddo oa Araibu To~ū; abbreviated as DOA2) is a 1999 fighting game developed by Team Ninja and published by Tecmo for arcades. Initially only released in Japan, it was later released worldwide and was ported to the Dreamcast and PlayStation 2 home systems in 2000. It is the second main entry in the Dead or Alive fighting series following the original Dead or Alive (1996). Several enhanced editions of the game were released, including the updates Dead or Alive 2 Millennium for arcades and Dead or Alive 2 Hardcore or Dead or Alive 2 Hard*Core for the PS2.

The game's plot focuses on the evil tengu, Gohyakumine Bankotsubo, who escaped from the tengu world into the human world, and the Dead or Alive tournament's change in purpose and significance after the murder of DOATEC's founder and CEO, Fame Douglas. The game improved upon the gameplay system by including many new features; it improved upon and popularized the concept of multi-tiered environments and improved upon the graphics engine of its predecessor by utilizing the Sega NAOMI hardware.

Dead or Alive 2 received universal acclaim, strong sales, and is considered one of the greatest fighting games of all time. By 2001, all versions of Dead or Alive 2 combined totaled over 1.5 million units sold worldwide. In 2004, Dead or Alive 2 was remade for the Xbox as part of Dead or Alive Ultimate. In 2012, DOA2: Hard*Core was released on the PlayStation Network platform in Japan, followed by North America in 2015. Dead or Alive 2 was followed by its sequel Dead or Alive 3 in 2001.

== Gameplay ==
A fight between Kasumi and Leifang in DOA2 on the Dreamcast

Dead or Alive 2 takes after its predecessor in gameplay, retaining its speed and reaction time-focused combat. The two kinds of hold, Offensive Hold and Defensive Hold, return; the latter are executed by holding back or forward on the directional pad along with the guard input to either force away or counter-damage an opponent. The "danger zones" from the original are removed in favor of more interactive areas.

One unique addition in DOA2 is that fights can occur on either water or ice; when a character is on such a surface, all non-knockdown, non-launching attacks will induce a stun on any successful hit. Walls and falls in the middle of stages are everywhere in the game. There are also some walls that are either electrified, or booby-trapped, clearly causing significantly more damage when a character is slammed into a wall by either a knockdown blow, a throw, or a hold, thereby encouraging such attacks to the wall. Many stages have multiple floors: to get to other floors of the stage, one character must be knocked off a ledge and fall into the next area. These falls deal usually high damage, but not enough to knock the opponent out.

DOA2 also introduced a new mode called Tag Battle Mode which implements a Tag team fighting system that allows players to choose two fighters to form a team, and fight against another team controlled by either the computer, or by other players. Tag Battle Mode allows characters to switch back and forth instantaneously for combo attacks and even attack simultaneously when timed correctly. Special throws unique to every possible pair, Tag Throws, do a great amount of damage to the opponent. There are no limitations for the choice of fighters, allowing for a multitude of unique gameplay styles.

Other notable features include computer animated cutscenes, allowing players to juggle each other into walls, propelling characters from landmarks for more damage, and upon completing the game, presenting the player with somewhat ambiguous endings for the character chosen using the game's standard engine.

== Characters ==
Dead or Alive 2 features a total of 15 fighters, 14 playable fighters and the unplayable Kasumi X. Two of them are unlockable and cannot be used in story mode or in the arcade version. The ten returning veterans from the first DOA game are Ayane, Bass Armstrong, Bayman (unlockable), Gen Fu, Jann Lee, Kasumi, Leifang, Ryu Hayabusa, Tina Armstrong, and Zack. The four newcomers are Ein, Helena Douglas, Leon, and Tengu (unlockable boss).

=== New ===
- Ein, a merciless karateka who was left to die in the esoteric Black forest of Germany. Now with serious amnesia, he cannot remember his past life and aims to find answers to his self-discovery through participation in the second tournament.
- Helena Douglas, a French opera singer, piguaquan practitioner, and the illegitimate daughter of the founder and former DOATEC leader, Fame Douglas, whose recent assassination has pulled Helena into despair. Her mother, while accompanying her daughter on stage at the Opera House, took a bullet meant for Helena. Helena vowed to seek revenge on the assassin. Discovering that the murder of both her parents is somehow related to DOATEC, she joins the second tournament, determined to find the assassin.
- Kasumi X ^{a}, a clone of Kasumi created by the DOATEC Super-human Development Project.
- Leon, an Italian mercenary soldier and Russian martial arts practitioner who wanders all over the world. His lover Rolande, a thief who worked the Silk Road, died in his arms murmuring that he, the man she loves is the strongest man in the world. In order to fulfill the last words of Rolande, Leon enters the tournament, aspired to be the strongest man on earth.
- Tengu ^{b} ^{c} ^{d}, real name Gohyakumine Bankotsubo; an evil tengu of the tengu world who murdered his leader, Kuramasan Maouson. He enters the human world to create chaos and make it reign over the world.

=== Returning ===
- Ayane
- Bass Armstrong
- Bayman ^{c} ^{d}
- Gen Fu
- Jann Lee
- Kasumi
- Leifang
- Ryu Hayabusa
- Tina Armstrong
- Zack

^a Unplayable
^b Boss character
^c Unlockable and playable only in the Hardcore version and Japanese Dreamcast version
^d Unplayable in Story Mode

== Plot ==
Fame Douglas, founder and CEO of DOATEC was killed at the end of the 20th century. He was renowned as the sponsor of the legendary Dead or Alive World Combat Championship. After his death, the world began to become chaotic. In the middle of the chaos, it was announced that the second Dead or Alive World Combat Championship will be held.

The purpose and significance of the tournament changed after Douglas' death. The promoter of the second Dead or Alive Championship, who is fond of conflicts and jealous of the strong, is responsible for Douglas's death. The new promoter, Victor Donovan, is more than a corrupt mastermind, but a man of pure evil. His involvement in the tournament began to bring a sense of terror to the world, resulting in the infamous tengu disaster.

Set less than a year later after the original tournament, an evil tengu known as Gohyakumine Bankotsubo, or just Tengu, escapes from the tengu world and threatens the human world's peace and stability. Tengu considers all functions of the human world to be insignificant, and claims that all disasters are nothing more than illusions he has brought about. Kasumi, who won the first tournament was captured by the DOATEC Super-human Development Project and was unwillingly used in the organization's attempt to develop a physical body with superhuman abilities. Kasumi escapes, but her clone "Kasumi X" was created while she was being held captive. Kasumi's brother Hayate, previously injured by Raidou, was also captured and was unwillingly used as a subject of DOATEC's bio-weapon experiment, Epsilon. Modifications were made to Hayate's nervous system, but failed to produce an improvement in the project. As a result, the experiment became a failure.

Ryu Hayabusa (from Ninja Gaiden) enters the tournament vowing to seek and destroy the evil tengu. Though a dangerous, suicidal task for any ordinary man, Hayabusa owes it to himself and to mankind to confront his fate. Hayabusa tries to warn other competitors like Jann Lee about the dangers of the tournament, but finds them unwilling to backdown, so he proceeds to knock them out of the tournament. He later meets a competitor named Ein, who is actually the missing Hayate suffering from amnesia. During their fight, Hayabusa defeats him and restores some semblance of his memory. Eventually, Hayabusa comes face to face with the evil Tengu. He defeats and kills Tengu, winning the tournament.

== Development ==
The gameplay and graphics were enhanced and based on a better game engine than the one used in the first game, as all resources went into the characters and the stages. Running on the Sega NAOMI arcade board, it allowed the characters and stages to appear less angular and more detailed. Wanting to emulate gorgeous scenes of martial arts movies, Tomonobu Itagaki and Team Ninja went so far to invite professional martial artists to perform motion capture, making the characters' moves smoother, and developed multi-tiered stages where opponents can be knocked off edges of landmarks down to lower levels where the fight continues.

In a June 1999 interview with German magazine MAN!AC, producer Tomonobu Itagaki revealed that the development team consisted of approximately 40 people, fewer than ten of whom were programmers, with the remainder primarily responsible for design. He explained that the Sega NAOMI arcade hardware significantly accelerated development compared with the Sega Model 2 system used for the original game. Whereas testing a prototype on Model 2 required approximately a day to prepare a flash ROM and install it in an arcade cabinet, prototypes could be tested on NAOMI within two to three hours. Itagaki also stated that some character animations were created manually, while others employed motion capture, including performances by a female model. He cited the waterfall in The Legend of Zelda: Ocarina of Time as an inspiration for the game's waterfall stage.

During development, Team Ninja revised the game's control system, introducing a dedicated "Free" (F) button for defensive actions and movement. In September 1999, Dreamcast Magazine highlighted the new Free Step mechanic, which allowed fighters to move in eight directions around their opponents, encouraging players to make greater use of the interactive environments. The revised Defensive Hold system also allowed players to counter different types of attacks, although unsuccessful counters could leave them vulnerable.

Ahead of the September 1999 amusement-machine show, Team Ninja discussed the arcade version's presentation with Dreamcast Magazine, emphasizing its use of the NAOMI hardware for enhanced graphics and sound. The team described the game as effectively complete at the time of the demonstration.

Dead or Alive 2 features the song "Exciter" by Japanese punk band, Bomb Factory, in its opening sequence. Also used as background tracks are "Deadly Silence Beach" and "Clumsy Bird". Both "Exciter" and "Deadly Silence Beach" can be found on the self-titled mini-album, Bomb Factory, and on the Dead or Alive 2 Original Sound Trax ~PlayStation 2 Version~. "Clumsy Bird" can be found on the album, Break Up.

== Release ==
Dead or Alive 2 arcade cabinet

Nine different versions (excluding DOA2 Ultimate on Xbox and the two PSN releases) of Dead or Alive 2 were released: two for the arcade market, and the others were home versions. Tomonobu Itagaki and Team Ninja were constantly enhancing the game for both the Dreamcast and PlayStation 2 as they worked towards their vision of the "ultimate fighting game".

=== Arcade ===
Dead or Alive 2 was first released in the arcades on October 16, 1999. It featured twelve playable characters, Story Mode and Time Attack Mode. It also included Survival Mode and Tag Battle, but these had to be unlocked with a code in the service menu. An update titled Dead or Alive 2 Millennium was released in arcades worldwide in 2000. This made Survival and Tag Battle available from the start and added school uniforms for Kasumi and Ayane.

=== Console versions ===
The Dreamcast port was first released in North America on February 29, 2000. It was identical to the arcade Millennium update release, but added the usual Versus and Sparring modes, as well as Team Battle Mode. This version also featured a simplified hold system compared to the one in the arcade versions. Unlike home ports of the first Dead or Alive game, there were no unlockables in this release. Team Ninja immediately started working on the console version as Tecmo planned to be listed on the Tokyo Stock Exchange in March 2000. Since the development environment for the Dreamcast was very convenient and the NAOMI hardware was the same as the Dreamcast, the team managed to complete the Dreamcast port in February 2000 as planned. Dead or Alive 2 was the only game that Tecmo published on the Dreamcast.

Dead or Alive 2 was released as a launch title for the PlayStation 2 in Japan on March 30, 2000. This version added new stages (Crimson, Koku An and Prairie) and new unlockable costumes. The game engine of the PlayStation 2 port ran using Field Rendering instead of Frame Rendering, thus the PlayStation 2 port appeared much more aliased than the Dreamcast port. This version was buggy and prone to lock up in Versus mode, leaving Japanese players disappointed. Itagaki and his team were only given two months initially to produce the first PlayStation 2 port. Itagaki was greatly disappointed in how the PlayStation 2's development environment was not as convenient as the Dreamcast's, and felt that he could not complete the PlayStation 2 version as planned in March 2000. Itagaki tried to postpone the game, but Tecmo executives insisted on releasing it on time. At the end of this, one of Itagaki's managers tricked him into releasing the game by asking to borrow a copy to play, but instead sent it to a production factory. Itagaki was upset by not being able to finish the game on his own terms and fell into a depression during which he briefly considered quitting the industry.

On March 2, 2000, Acclaim Entertainment announced they had secured global publishing rights outside North America, Japan and Southeast Asia to the Dreamcast version from Tecmo, announcing that the game would be released on May 26. On March 21, the date was pushed forward to April 28. The overseas release included the costumes from the Japanese PlayStation 2 version, as well as costumes for Zack and Tina based on Shadow Man and his love interest.

The Japanese Dreamcast version (known as the Limited Edition) was released on September 28, 2000. The cover art featured Kasumi and Ayane, along with a standard cover art version with Kasumi, Ayane and Leifang. The most notable addition was that Bankotsubo and Bayman were now unlockable, playable in all but Story Mode. The new stages from the PlayStation 2 version were not included, in favor of new versions of Burai Zenin and L's Castle stages from the first game. This version also added Sparring mode for Tag Battle, Watch Mode, the User Profile System, online play, more costumes to unlock, and a Gallery Mode with character renders.

=== DOA2: Hardcore ===
On October 25, 2000, Tecmo released DOA2: Hardcore (DOA2: Dead or Alive 2 in Europe) as a launch title for the PlayStation 2 in America and on December 15, 2000, in Europe. This version was based on the Japanese second update of Dead or Alive 2 for the Dreamcast and featured new playable characters, new stages, extra costumes and introduced the "Gallery" option. The Hardcore release was finally the complete game Itagaki had envisioned at the time, featuring many changes compared to its predecessor: characters, pictures and moves were altered to appear more realistic, lessening the anime-look. Some fighting animations were elaborated upon, while others were cut. New stages were added (8 more than the Dreamcast update). More character outfits were added. Overall gameplay speed was increased, and the entire game (including cutscenes) now ran at a full 60 frames-per-second (in the Dreamcast version, the game ran at 60fps, while cutscenes ran at 30).

A special "Items Collection" feature and menu section was added to appeal to video game collectors. New artworks were added, and a CG Gallery section featuring renders of the female characters was added. The player history files were enhanced, and now included statistics on how often the player used each character, and tag battle pairing. Several special moves were added, but left undocumented. English voice-overs (provided by Brian Vouglas, Donna Mae Wong, Gina Rose, Jeremy Hou, John Parsons, Lucy Kee, Roger Jackson, Sally Dana, Terry McGovern, Timothy Enos, and Zoe Galvez) were added in addition to the original Japanese voice-overs, making it the first game in the series to have English voice-overs. Kasumi can be unlocked as a trainable 'monster' in Monster Rancher 4 by going to the Shrine, and inserting the DOA2: Hardcore disk in the PS2.

Tecmo followed up on the release of Hardcore in the US and Europe with the release of DOA2: Hard*Core in Japan. This last version saw some minor updates, including new cutscenes, a few new costumes, a new turbo speed option, and a second opening sequence which features an English version of the Bomb Factory song "How Do You Feel". This was the last Dead or Alive game to be released for a Sony system, as the series became exclusive to the Xbox until the release of Dead or Alive Paradise, Dead or Alive: Dimensions, and Dead or Alive 5 respectively. "The Best" and "Platinum" editions of DOA2: Hardcore were released in 2001.

=== Merchandise ===
Two soundtrack CDs were released in 2000 by Wake Up in Japan: Dead or Alive 2 Original Sound Trax (KWCD-1001) and Dead or Alive 2 Original Sound Trax ~PlayStation 2 Version~ (KWCD-1004). Two guide books for the game were published in North America by Prima Games (Dead or Alive 2: Prima's Official Strategy Guide and DOA2: Hardcore: Prima's Official Strategy Guide). Several Japanese guide books for the game were also published by SoftBank (Dead or Alive 2 Perfect Guide, Dead or Alive 2 Perfect Guide Dreamcast Ban, Dead or Alive 2 Hard Core Perfect Guide) and Dengeki (Dead or Alive 2 Kōshiki Kōryaku Guide, Dead or Alive 2 Kōshiki Kōryaku & Girls, Dead or Alive 2 Hard Core Kōshiki Kōryaku Guide).

=== Digital release ===
On August 22, 2012, an emulated version of DOA2: Hard*Core was made available as a downloadable game for the PlayStation 3 on the Japanese PlayStation Network. The North American version was released to the US PlayStation Network on March 24, 2015.

== Reception ==
Reception

Aggregate scores
Aggregator	Score	
Aggregator	Dreamcast	PS2
GameRankings	91%	87%
Metacritic		91/100

Review scores
Publication	Score	
Publication	Dreamcast	PS2
AllGame	4/5	4/5
Computer and Video Games	5/5	4/5
Edge	8 / 10	
Famitsu	8/10, 8/10, 8/10, 8/10	9/10, 8/10, 9/10, 8/10
Game Informer		9 / 10
GamePro	5 / 5	5 / 5
GameRevolution	B+	B+
GameSpot	9.7 / 10	8.9 / 10
IGN	9.4 / 10	8.7 / 10
Next Generation	5/5	5/5
PlayStation: The Official Magazine		81%
Arcade	5/5	
DC-UK	9 / 10	
Dreamcast Magazine	28 / 30	
Electric Playground	9.4 / 10	

Awards
Publication	Award
Academy of Interactive Arts & Sciences (2001)	Console Fighting Game of the Year
IGN	PS2: Best Fighting Game of 2000

Dead or Alive 2 was "universally acclaimed", scoring 91% and 91/100 on GameRankings and Metacritic. In Japan, Famitsu scored the game a 34 out of 40.

=== Commercial ===
Dead or Alive 2 brought more than a profit of 2 million dollars. In Japan, Game Machine listed Dead or Alive 2 on their December 15, 1999 issue as being the second most-successful arcade game of the month. The PlayStation 2 version would top the Japanese charts on release, coming in number 2 during Week 14 in 2000. The Dreamcast version also top the Japanese charts on release, coming in number 2 during Week 40 in 2000. In Spain, the Dreamcast version of Dead or Alive 2 ranked second on video game retailer Centro Mail's sales chart in the September 2000 issue of Revista Oficial Dreamcast, before rising to first place in the October issue. The arcade and Dreamcast versions combined sold over 500,000 units while the PlayStation 2 versions combined sold over 1 million for a combined total of 1.5 million units. The PlayStation 2 versions were re-issued as part of the low price-categorized "The Best" and "Platinum" line of games in 2001.

=== Critical ===
Dead or Alive 2 is considered one of the best fighting games in the genre in terms of gameplay and expanded game modes. On GameRankings, the Dreamcast version was met with universal acclaim, while the PS2 version was very well received, and received universal acclaim on Metacritic. Famitsu scored the Dreamcast version 32/40 and the PS2 version 34/40. Both versions were praised for its graphics, cutscenes and gameplay. Main criticism was the poor English voice dub used in the updated version for the PS2 titled DOA2: Hardcore, much like other English dubbed-Japanese video games.

For the original Dreamcast and PlayStation 2 versions, Greg Orlando of Next Generation rated it 5 stars out of 5, and stated that "You'd have to be Dead and Buried not be enjoy Dead or Alive 2. Gorgeous graphics, excellent gameplay, and some beautiful characters put this square in the running against Namco's Soul Calibur as the best Dreamcast fighting game." Jeff Lundrigan of Next Generation also rated it 5 stars out of 5, and stated that "This is a tremendous game and a must-have, but if you can choose between the two versions, PS2 enjoys an edge thanks to all the extras – just get used to squinting at the too-bright lights and nasty jaggies." James Mielke of GameSpot scored it a 9.7 out of 10, giving praise to the gameplay, beautiful animation and environments, calling Dead or Alive 2 "the hardest hitting game in town" and "a must, must buy". Mielke called the fast combat the best thing about Dead or Alive 2, also praising the game's Tag Battle mode and stating how "no other 3D (or even 2D) fighter matches DOA2 for sheer intensity and speed. This game is for hard-core gamers only." Overall, calling Dead or Alive 2 "superb" and "excellent".

For the Hardcore version, Jeff Lundrigan of Next Generation rated it 5 stars out of 5, and stated that "This is the best-looking, most full-featured, most packed-with-extras version of one of the best fighting games ever made. Buy it, period." David Smith of IGN gave it an 8.7 out of 10, calling DOA2: Hardcore "the best version around", stating how he always preferred Dead or Alive's speed, balance, character design, and levels, even if Tekken may be the majority choice. Gamespot scored it 8.9 out of 10, saying how the game "looks simply amazing", and that "the animation is smooth, but the character models are what really stand out". Game Pro rated DOA2: Hardcore 5 out of 5, calling it a must have PlayStation 2 game for fighting enthusiasts. Hot Games called it "One of the best looking fighters so far for the PS2, it eclipses Street Fighter EX3 and Tekken Tag Tournament for beauty." and stated how "It's also a pick-up-and-play fighter, making it one of the most fun as well." GameSpy states how DoA2: Hardcore's innovative style of play, coupled with blazing fast graphics makes it a title to own. J.M. Vargas of PSX Nation gave it an 8 out of 10, stating that DOA2: Hardcore "takes better advantage of the PS2 than Tekken Tag Tournament, IMHO, with incredible physics, realistic fighters and fast action not seen in any other modern brawler".

=== Awards ===
During the AIAS' 4th Annual Interactive Achievement Awards, Dead or Alive 2 was honored with the "Console Fighting Game of the Year" award, and also received a nomination in the "Animation" category. IGN awarded it "Best PS2 Fighting Game of 2000" during their Best of 2000 Awards. The game was nominated for "Best Fighting Game" at E3's Game Critics Awards. Hardcore was a runner-up for GameSpot's annual "Best Graphics, Technical" and "Best Fighting Game" awards among console games, but lost respectively to Shenmue and Capcom vs. SNK: Millennium Fight 2000.

== Legacy ==
Dead or Alive 2 was notable for improving and popularizing the concept of multi-tiered environments, also known as stage transitions. The game took the concept to a new level, creating a more interactive and engaging gameplay experience. Its interactive multi-tiered environments offered all kinds of interactive features that made the game feel alive. The way the intensity of the action triples when knocking opponents off of edges such as cliffs or out of windows, then leaping down after them and continue fighting down below made the experience feel very dynamic, strategic and rewarding. GamesRadar+ included Dead or Alive 2 on their list of best Dreamcast games, stating that "Dead or Alive's first sequel used separate graphics engines for its fighting and cut-scenes, allowing for unprecedented graphical fidelity." In 2010, UGO.com ranked it as the ninth top fighting game of all time, "perhaps most important for introducing Itagaki's famous breast physics engine." In 2020, TheGamer ranked DOA2: Hardcore "2nd best launch game for the PS2", calling the combat "lightning fast, and easy to pick up with counters and reversals that work better than any other fighter", also stating how the character animations are "smooth and fluid and move around the 3D space more naturally than similar titles like Soul Calibur", and stating that it visually "looked a generation ahead of games like Tekken Tag Tournament and Street Fighter EX3."

Dead or Alive 2 appears in the 2002 film Run Ronnie Run, where the character, Jerry Trellis (portrayed by E.J. De la Pena), is shown playing the game as Kasumi in two different scenes and as Gen Fu in one scene. Near the end of the film, Jerry uses some of Kasumi's moves in a real fight. The game also appears in the 2002 film One Hour Photo, where the character, Jake Yorkin (portrayed by Dylan Smith), is playing the game in his bedroom.

== Remake ==
Dead or Alive Ultimate is a remake of DOA and DOA2 for the Xbox with a greatly improved graphics engine. As it was created after Dead or Alive 3, it takes elements and mechanics from both its original iteration and successor. The action of 3D-axis movement is as free-formatted as DOA3, and Hitomi, as well as Tengu are now playable characters (albeit outside story mode), but other elements have been kept intact from DOA2. The biggest set of changes instituted in Dead or Alive Ultimate are online play over Xbox Live and the inclusion of slopes, which are a type of environmental hazard.
