= Dead or Alive Ultimate =

2004 video game

- European cover art
- Developer: Team Ninja
- Publisher: Tecmo
- Director: Tomonobu Itagaki
- Producers: Tomonobu Itagaki; Yasushi Maeda; Mitsuo Osada
- Designers: Katsunori Ehara; Motohiro Shiga; Yōhei Shinbori
- Programmer: Takeshi Sawatari
- Composer: Ryo Koike
- Series: Dead or Alive
- Platform: Xbox
- Release: October 26, 2004: NA: October 26, 2004; JP: November 3, 2004; EU: February 18, 2005
- Genre: Fighting
- Modes: Single-player, multiplayer

Dead or Alive Ultimate (Note: Japanese: DEAD OR ALIVE ULTIMATE(デッドオアアライブアルティメット), Hepburn: Deddo oa Araibu Arutimetto; also known as DOA Ultimate or DOAU) is a 2004 fighting game compilation developed by Team Ninja and published by Tecmo for the Xbox. It is a collection of the two previous games in the series, 1996's Dead or Alive and 1999's Dead or Alive 2. It marks the first game in the series to be a compilation. DOA Ultimate contains a high-resolution edition of the Sega Saturn version of Dead or Alive, and an enhanced remake of Dead or Alive 2 which utilizes a new graphics engine and offers Dead or Alive 3 game mechanics, new game content and the inclusion of Hitomi as a playable character. The game offered online multiplayer capabilities, making the compilation among the first fighting games to offer online play.

Ultimate received generally favorable reviews from critics who praised the games' online functionalities. In 2006, both games became backwards compatible on Xbox 360. In 2021, both games were made available to download on Xbox Live worldwide, and were later added to the list of backward compatible games on Xbox One and Xbox Series X/S.

== Gameplay ==
Dead or Alive Ultimate is a compilation game that includes an enhanced version of Dead or Alive 1 and a remade version of Dead or Alive 2. The remade version of Dead or Alive 2 has re-developed graphics and new stages for the Xbox gaming system. The enhanced version of Dead or Alive 1 is the original Sega Saturn version, with smoothed graphics, but lacks the additional content received in the later-released North American PlayStation version (no Bass or Ayane characters or extra costumes). Both editions include online play, as well as an option to change between the two voice actors for Kasumi, known as the "Voice History" setting, with the "1996–2000" option being Sakura Tange's original voice lines and the "2001–" option being Houko Kuwashima's re-recorded voice lines.

Dead or Alive 1 Ultimate is essentially identical to its original Sega Saturn version, and is generally considered more of a collector's disc than for its content. Dead or Alive 2 Ultimate, being a remake created after the debut of Dead or Alive 3, takes elements and mechanics from both its original iteration and successor. The action of 3D-axis movement is as free-formatted as DOA3, and Hitomi is now a playable character albeit outside story mode. Other elements have been kept intact from DOA2. These include higher damaging counters than in DOA3, environmental hazards not warranting a knockout on a character, and a counter mechanism that is much harder to execute. Despite being able to freely move on a 3D axis in the Ultimate version of DOA2 however, most moves cannot be sidestepped as in DOA3 and other 3D fighters. Another major change is in the revamped holding system in DOA2 Ultimate. The final major set of changes instituted in 2 Ultimate is the inclusion of slopes, which are a type of environmental hazard where those knocked down them roll down the slope, taking damage as they fall.

The game required Xbox Live in order to play online. The service's support makes it the first Japanese online console fighting game, the second online console fighting game to be released in America and Europe (Mortal Kombat: Deception having been the first) and the first online console fighting game in Japan. While Xbox Live for the original Xbox was discontinued in 2010, Dead or Alive Ultimate is now playable online using the replacement Xbox Live servers called Insignia.

The system set forth by Tecmo for online play in Dead or Alive Ultimate was intended to recreate the feel of playing at an arcade. Players would log onto a shared "lobby" and then observe other matches until it was their turn to participate. Each lobby has a set of gameplay parameters that is determined by its creator, allowing for tournament-style play.

While this game brings back the old mechanics of the Dreamcast version of Dead or Alive 2, some changes to the music and remixes were added. Each character except Hitomi (who was introduced in DOA3) has their own remix. The remixes only appear in the Dance Floor stage, The Ray House.

== Characters ==
Ultimate features a total of 16 playable characters. Dead or Alive 1 Ultimate features a roster of 9 playable characters while Dead or Alive 2 Ultimate features a roster of 15 playable characters.

- Ayane ^{a}
- Bass Armstrong ^{a}
- Bayman ^{b}
- Ein ^{a}
- Gen Fu
- Helena Douglas ^{a}
- Hitomi ^{a} ^{b} ^{c}
- Jann Lee
- Kasumi
- Leifang
- Leon ^{a}
- Raidou ^{b} ^{d}
- Ryu Hayabusa
- Tengu ^{a} ^{b}
- Tina Armstrong
- Zack

^a Only playable in 2 Ultimate
^b Unlockable character
^c Accessible by owning a copy of Dead or Alive 3
^d Only playable in 1 Ultimate

== Plot ==
The story mode of Dead or Alive Ultimate plays out as it did in the original games. However, a new CG opening sequence is added, further explaining the relationship and history of Mugen Tenshin ninjas, Kasumi, Ayane and Hayate, revealing the village they all hail from. It also reveals Kasumi's and Hayate's father, Shiden, who was mentioned in the first Dead or Alive, Ayane's foster-father, Genra, before his monstrous transformation in Dead or Alive 3, and introduces Ayame, mother of Kasumi, Hayate and Ayane. The sequence reveals the rape of Ayame by Kasumi's and Hayate's uncle, Raidou, leading to the birth of Ayane, her being raised by Genra, and Raidou's crippling of Hayate, leading to Hayate's comatose state and Kasumi's quest for vengeance on Raidou. The CG sequence acts as a prologue leading into the first three Dead or Alive games.

== Development and release ==
Dead or Alive Ultimate promo booth at Tokyo Game Show 2004

In 2004, after the release of Dead or Alive 3, Team Ninja once again remade Dead or Alive 2, this time for the Xbox system. In the planning stages, this new game was originally named Dead or Alive Online for its addition of online support. On January 14, it was renamed to Dead or Alive Ultimate and promised fresh content, additional characters, re-recorded voiceovers, most notably Kasumi, which was now voiced by Houko Kuwashima, and an upgraded version of the original Dead or Alive for the Sega Saturn. According to Tecmo, the name change was due to the opinion that "Ultimate would more accurately describe the feeling players feel upon experiences with the game".

Hitomi from Dead or Alive 3 was added to the game roster as an unlockable character, and owning a copy of Dead or Alive 3 makes Hitomi accessible in Dead or Alive Ultimate. In Japan, Dead or Alive Ultimate was released with a crystal-clear blue version of the Xbox system that included a controller of the same color, a copy of Dead or Alive Ultimate, and some bonus Kasumi-themed extras. In the United States, two trading cards with character pictures on them were randomly included in each game as part of a collector's edition. The game disc of the North American release also contains the Booster Pack for the North American version of Dead or Alive 3, which adds numerous character costumes found in the European and Japanese versions of Dead or Alive 3. This disc also included the G4-produced segment from their Icons series entitled "Dead or Alive", detailing the history of the Dead or Alive series, along with interviews featuring various people from the video game industry, including series creator Tomonobu Itagaki. A guide book titled Dead or Alive Ultimate: Prima Official Game Guide by Prima Games was released on November 4, 2004. The Platinum Collection of the game was released in 2005.

=== Backwards compatibility and digital release ===
With the December 14, 2006, backwards compatibility update for the Xbox 360, the Xbox release of Dead or Alive Ultimate was made playable on the Xbox 360. On November 10, 2021, Dead or Alive 1 Ultimate and Dead or Alive 2 Ultimate became available to download separately on Xbox Live worldwide along with Dead or Alive 3, hinting at the addition of the games to Xbox One backward compatibility program. On November 15, 2021, all 3 games were added to the line up and became playable on Xbox One and Xbox Series X/S.

== Reception ==
Reception

Aggregate scores
Aggregator	Score
GameRankings	84%
Metacritic	83/100

Review scores
Publication	Score
1Up.com	A
Eurogamer	8/10
Famitsu	32/40
Game Informer	9/10
GamePro	4.5/5
GameSpot	8.8/10
GameSpy	4/5
GamesRadar+	9/10
GameZone	9.6/10
IGN	9.2/10
Official Xbox Magazine (US)	8.8/10
PALGN	8/10
TeamXbox	9.5/10
Detroit Free Press	4/4
Yahoo! Games	4.5/5

Awards
Publication	Award
National Academy of Video Game Trade Reviewers (NAVGTR)	Game…Sequel Fighting
IGN	Best Fighting Game of 2004; Xbox: Best Graphics of 2004; Xbox: Best Non-Playable Presentation (E3 2004)

Dead or Alive Ultimate received generally favorable reviews from critics with a score of 84.14% and 83/100 from review aggregators GameRankings and Metacritic. In Japan, Famitsu gave it a score of 32 out of 40.

IGN's Hilary Golden praised its online functionality, stating how "the online set-up goes well beyond what has been previously done for fighting games and betters some online first-person shooters to boot". Golden concluded that "the greatly improved arenas, the plethora of costumes, the addition of slope moves, and the implementation of Xbox Live play makes DOA Ultimate one of the best games this year". GameSpot's Greg Kasavin called it "a landmark achievement in the fighting game genre's history-in-the-making", praising its innovative, impressive and well implemented online component, and praised how the Dead or Alive gameplay formula held up well over the years. Kasavin criticized the gameplay being unchanged from years-old predecessors and the absence of Dead or Alive 3 characters "Hayate", "Christie", and "Brad Wong" from the roster, but concluded that "For a game that's so bold as to call itself "Ultimate", DOAU sure comes close. It truly is the best, most fully featured title in the Dead or Alive series yet".

=== Sales and awards ===
Dead or Alive Ultimate topped the Japanese charts on release, coming in number 4 during Week 45 in 2004 with over 52,000 copies sold in its first week, and would sell over 56,000 copies in Japan alone. Prior to release, the game's E3 presentation was awarded "Best Non-Playable Xbox Presentation" by IGN. After its release, it was awarded "Fighting Game of the Year" at the 2004 National Academy of Video Game Trade Reviewers Awards (NAVGTR Awards). IGN awarded the game "Best Fighting Game of 2004" and "Best Xbox Graphics of 2004" during their Best of 2004 awards. It also received a runner-up position in GameSpot's 2004 "Best Fighting Game" category across all platforms, losing to Mortal Kombat: Deception. Dead or Alive Ultimate was re-issued in the Platinum Collection line of games in 2005.

=== Legacy ===
Dead or Alive Ultimate was the first Japanese fighting game and the second fighting game after Mortal Kombat: Deception to offer online multiplayer. Dead or Alive Ultimate's online mode along with the online modes of Mortal Kombat: Deception and the Xbox version of Street Fighter Anniversary Collection, connected players of different regions together during the time the fighting game community (FGC) was in a state of stagnation.

In 2005, Dead or Alive Ultimate became the first fighting game to be included in the World Cyber Games (WCG).
