= Characters of the Dead or Alive series =

Fictional character

The cast of Dead or Alive as they appear in Dead or Alive: Dimensions. From top left to top right: Genra, Ein, La Mariposa, Eliot, Tengu, Alpha-152, and Kasumi Alpha. From bottom left to bottom right: Bayman, Zack, Leon, Hayate, Christie, Tina Armstrong, Bass Armstrong, Kokoro, Ryu Hayabusa, Kasumi, Jann Lee, Leifang, Brad Wong, Helena Douglas, Ayane, Hitomi, Raidou, and Gen Fu

The following is a list of characters from the Dead or Alive video game series, created by Team Ninja and Tecmo.

== Characters ==
=== Main series ===
Comparison table

Yes = Playable by default.

Yes = Playable via update or unlockable.

Guest = Third-party character.

NPC = Non-playable character.

No = Not included.

Character	1 / ++	2 / 2U	3	4	Online	Dimensions	5 / 5U / 5LR	6 / 6LR	Total
(Japan) Kasumi	Yes	Yes	Yes	Yes	Yes	Yes	Yes	Yes	8
(United States) Tina Armstrong	Yes	Yes	Yes	Yes	Yes	Yes	Yes	Yes	8
(China) Gen Fu	Yes	Yes	Yes	Yes	Yes	Yes	Yes	No	7
(United States) Zack	Yes	Yes	Yes	Yes	Yes	Yes	Yes	Yes	8
(China) Jann Lee	Yes	Yes	Yes	Yes	Yes	Yes	Yes	Yes	8
(China) Leifang	Yes	Yes	Yes	Yes	Yes	Yes	Yes	Yes	8
(Russia) Bayman	Yes	Yes^{2}	Yes	Yes	Yes	Yes	Yes	Yes	8
(Japan) Ryu Hayabusa	Yes	Yes	Yes	Yes	Yes	Yes	Yes	Yes	8
(United States) Bass Armstrong	Yes^{1}	Yes	Yes	Yes	Yes	Yes	Yes^{10}	Yes	8
(Japan) Ayane	Yes^{1}	Yes	Yes	Yes	Yes	Yes	Yes	Yes	8
(Japan) Raidou	Yes	No	No	No	No	Yes	Yes^{6}	Yes	4
(France) Helena Douglas	No	Yes	Yes	Yes	Yes	Yes	Yes	Yes	7
(Japan) Ein	No	Yes	Yes	Yes	Yes	Yes	Yes^{4}	No	6
(Italy) Leon	No	Yes	Yes	Yes	Yes	Yes	Yes^{4}	No	6
(Japan) Tengu	No	Yes	No	Yes	Yes	Yes	No	No	4
Kasumi α	No	NPC	No	No	No	Yes	No	No	2
(Germany) Hitomi	No	Yes^{3}	Yes	Yes	Yes	Yes	Yes	Yes	5
(Japan) Hayate	No	No	Yes	Yes	No	Yes	Yes	Yes	5
(United Kingdom) Christie	No	No	Yes	Yes	No	Yes	Yes	Yes	5
(Hong Kong) Brad Wong	No	No	Yes	Yes	No	Yes	Yes	Yes	5
(Japan) Omega	No	No	NPC	No	No	Yes	No	No	2
(Japan) Kokoro	No	No	No	Yes	No	Yes	Yes	Yes	4
(United Kingdom) Eliot	No	No	No	Yes	No	Yes	Yes	Yes	4
(United States) La Mariposa	No	No	No	Yes^{9}	No	Yes^{9}	Yes^{9}	Yes^{9}	4
SPARTAN-458	No	No	No	Guest	No	No	No	No	1
Alpha-152	No	No	No	NPC	No	Yes	Yes	No	3
(Japan) Shiden	No	No	No	No	No	Yes	No	No	1
(Spain) Mila	No	No	No	No	No	No	Yes	Yes	2
(Canada) Rig	No	No	No	No	No	No	Yes	Yes	2
False Kasumi	No	No	No	No	No	No	Yes^{11}	No	1
(Japan) Akira Yuki	No	No	No	No	No	No	Guest	No	1
(Hong Kong) Pai Chan	No	No	No	No	No	No	Guest	No	1
(United States) Sarah Bryant	No	No	No	No	No	No	Guest	No	1
(Japan) Momiji	No	No	No	No	No	No	Yes^{4}	Yes^{7}	2
Rachel	No	No	No	No	No	No	Yes^{4}	Yes^{7}	2
(United States) Jacky Bryant	No	No	No	No	No	No	Guest^{4}	No	1
(Sweden) Marie Rose	No	No	No	No	No	No	Yes^{5}	Yes	2
Phase 4	No	No	No	No	No	No	Yes^{5}	Yes^{7}	2
(Japan) Nyotengu	No	No	No	No	No	No	Yes^{5}	Yes^{7}	2
(Japan) Honoka	No	No	No	No	No	No	Yes^{6}	Yes	2
(Japan) Mai Shiranui	No	No	No	No	No	No	Guest^{6}	Guest^{7}	2
(Japan) Naotora Ii	No	No	No	No	No	No	Guest^{6}	No	1
(Finland) NiCO	No	No	No	No	No	No	No	Yes	1
(United States) Diego	No	No	No	No	No	No	No	Yes	1
Kula Diamond	No	No	No	No	No	No	No	Guest^{7}	1
(Japan) Tamaki	No	No	No	No	No	No	No	Yes^{7}	1
(Japan) Minato	No	No	No	No	No	No	No	Yes^{8}	1
Total	11	16	18	23	15	26	37	32	

Notes:

^1 Added in the PlayStation version and Dead or Alive++.
^2 Added in the Japanese Dreamcast version and Dead or Alive 2 Hardcore.
^3 Added in Dead or Alive 2 Ultimate.
^4 Added in Dead or Alive 5 Ultimate.
^5 Added in Dead or Alive 5 Ultimate as a DLC character.
^6 Added in Dead or Alive 5 Last Round.
^7 Added in Dead or Alive 6 as a DLC character.
^8 Added in Dead or Alive 6 Last Round as a DLC character.
^9 Also playable as Lisa Hamilton.
^10 Also playable as Mr. Strong.
^11 Only playable in the story mode.

=== Xtreme / Venus Vacation series ===
Character	XBV	X2	Paradise	X3	XVV	VVP	Total
(Japan) Kasumi	Yes	Yes	Yes	Yes	Yes	No	5
(China) Leifang	Yes	Yes	Yes	Yes (Note: Paid downloadable content.)	Yes (Note: Added as part of game update.)	No	5
(United States) Tina Armstrong	Yes	Yes	Yes	No	Yes	No	4
(Japan) Ayane	Yes	Yes	Yes	Yes	Yes	No	5
(France) Helena Douglas	Yes	Yes	Yes	Yes	Yes	No	5
(Germany) Hitomi	Yes	Yes	Yes	Yes	Yes	No	5
(United Kingdom) Christie	Yes	Yes	Yes	No	No	No	3
(United States) Lisa Hamilton	Yes	Yes	Yes	No	No	No	3
(Japan) Kokoro	No	Yes	Yes	Yes	Yes	No	4
(United States) Rio Rollins Tachibana	No	No	Yes	No	No	No	1
(Japan) Momiji	No	No	No	Yes	Yes	No	2
(Sweden) Marie Rose	No	No	No	Yes	Yes	No	2
(Japan) Nyotengu	No	No	No	Yes	Yes	No	2
(Japan) Honoka	No	No	No	Yes	Yes	Yes	3
(Japan) Misaki	No	No	No	Yes	Yes	Yes	3
Luna	No	No	No	No	Yes	No	1
(Japan) Tamaki	No	No	No	No	Yes	Yes	2
Fiona	No	No	No	No	Yes	Yes	2
(Japan) Nagisa	No	No	No	No	Yes	No	1
(Japan) Kanna	No	No	No	No	Yes	No	1
Monica	No	No	No	No	Yes	No	1
(Japan) Sayuri	No	No	No	No	Yes	No	1
Patty	No	No	No	No	Yes	No	1
(Japan) Tsukushi	No	No	No	No	Yes	No	1
Lobelia	No	No	No	No	Yes	No	1
(Japan) Nanami	No	No	No	No	Yes	Yes	2
Elise	No	No	No	No	Yes	Yes	2
(Japan) Koharu	No	No	No	No	Yes	No	1
Amy	No	No	No	No	Yes	No	1
Shandy	No	No	No	No	Yes	No	1
(Japan) Yukino	No	No	No	No	Yes	No	1
(Japan) Shizuku	No	No	No	No	Yes	No	1
(Japan) Reika	No	No	No	No	Yes	No	1
Meg	No	No	No	No	Yes	No	1
Total	8	9	10	9 (11)	10 (31)	6	

== Introduced in Dead or Alive ==
=== Bass Armstrong ===
Portrayed by: Kevin Nash
Voiced by (English): unknown actor (DOA2: Hardcore), Joe J. Thomas (Dimensions), Patrick Seitz (DOA5–present)
Voiced by (Japanese): Daisuke Gōri (DOA–DOA4), Kenta Miyake (Dimensions–present)

Bass Armstrong (バース・アームストロング, Bāsu Āmusutorongu) is a semi-retired professional wrestling champion and Tina's overprotective father. He is also the widower of Alicia Armstrong, who died of a disease when Tina was only six years old, forcing Bass to take care of her by himself. He disapproves of Tina's aspirations of being a model (DOA2), a Hollywood actress (DOA3) and a rock star (DOA4). Consequently, Bass enters the DOA tournaments to put an end to her fame-seeking, only to fail at each attempt. In the fourth tournament, it is revealed that he intends to win so he would have enough money to enter the "Hyper Battle Grand Prix", which he then loses after seeing Tina's picture on a billboard and crashes into it after losing control of his bike. Like Tina in the English versions of the game, he, too, speaks with a Southern accent. In DOA5, two years after the fourth tournament, Bass is a worker at an oil rig, DiG, and has befriended Rig. He decides to reenter the ring after the next tournament is announced, mainly after hearing that Tina will participate. He enters under the alias "Mr. Strong" so that his daughter would not recognize her; unfortunately for him, she does anyway. After defeating Tina in the quarterfinals, he is eliminated by Jann Lee in the semifinals. Some time after the fifth tournament, DiG was somehow destroyed and Rig was homeless because DiG was like a home to him; Bass offers to stay with him. As DOA6 tournament is about to start, he and Tina return to their wrestling career, with Rig hired to sponsor them. Bass is then introduced by his daughter's new MMA friend and their biggest fan, Mila, who eventually becomes his opponent and defeats him at the round of 16. When several groups and individuals such as the Mugen Tenshin, Hayabusa Ninjas, and the mercenary Bayman, are trying to come after Rig, Bass becomes worried about his best friend's situation and sudden disappearance, unaware that MIST brainwashed Rig into serving them.

In the live-action adaptation, Bass is played by professional wrestler Kevin Nash. In the movie, he tries to persuade Tina to return to wrestling. Bass' character is far more lighthearted in the movie, even applauding Tina when she beats him.

=== Bayman ===
Portrayed by: Derek Boyer
Voiced by (English): unknown actor (DOA2: Hardcore), Zach Hanks (Dimensions), Matthew Mercer (DOA5–present)
Voiced by (Japanese): Hisao Egawa (DOA), Banjō Ginga (DOA2-present)

Bayman (バイマン, Baiman) is a Russian and a former Spetsnaz who specializes in the sambo fighting style. He first joins the DOA tournament to assassinate Fame Douglas, and later joins the DOA3 tournament to retaliate against Donovan for the attempt on his life by a sniper. Bayman was born and raised as an orphan in the Soviet Union. He aspired to join the military and became one of the Soviet Army's highly trained commandos. But before he saw any action, the Soviet Union collapsed. Realizing the new regime would have no use for him, Bayman slipped through the cracks of the reformation and took up the life of a mercenary, putting his skills to good use in all manner of lethal assignments. He found particular pleasure in assassinations, especially challenging or high-profile assignments. His dream assignment came to him when he entered into the first Dead or Alive World Tournament under orders from Victor Donovan to assassinate its organizer, the renowned Fame Douglas, founder and chairman of DOATEC. With his task completed, Bayman fled, now branded an outlaw. After surviving a failed attack on his life by an unknown sniper who was sent by Donovan, Bayman decides to retaliate against his former client Donovan and shows up at the third tournament in vengeance. Bayman later enters the fourth tournament, still seeking revenge on Donovan. He meets Hayate who also shares a vendetta against Donovan. Bayman fights Christie to settle a score of the enmity that aroused between the two of them. At the end of the tournament, Bayman is held in captivity within the DOATEC Tritower and is being interrogated and drugged. During the chaos that erupts due to Ayane and Hayate's intervention, he frees himself from the drug by stabbing his own hand with a pen, while his interrogators flee and are killed in the process with Ayane's spell effects. In the fifth tournament, it is revealed that Bayman has survived the incident. He is no longer an assassin, but again works as a mercenary. After his men appears to be massacred at the hands of a Kasumi clone called Phase 4, but was spared, Bayman goes to Helena for answers, and decides to look into this on his own. He helps Hayate and Ayane find their target, first being a Kasumi clone, then take them to MIST secret hideout within the offshore, and departs. He later return to the sixth tournament, where he is presumably the one who rescued Lisa Hamilton off-screen, and one of the few people who found out Rig's situation as MIST's brainwashed pawn. Knowing that Rig was also Bass' best friend, he reveals Rig's current situation to Bass, but Bass does not believe him.

=== Gen Fu ===
Portrayed by: Fang Hue
Voiced by (English): Paul Nakauchi (Dimensions)
Voiced by (Japanese): Takeshi Aono (DOA–DOA4), Chikao Ōtsuka (Dimensions–DOA5)

Gen Fu (ゲン・フー, Gen Fū) is a humble book store owner and an old martial arts master who specializes in the xinyi liuhe quan fighting style, a powerful and dangerous martial art involving the use of the hands and upper body. The xinyi liuhe quan master became well known for possessing the iron fist, a legendary attack known for its awesome destructive power. He lived out his days in solitude and peaceful tranquility, looking after his young granddaughter, Mei Lin. At some point during the years, he took on Eliot as an apprentice; why he chose Eliot is a mystery, even to the boy himself. He fights in the DOA tournaments to obtain money to cure his sick granddaughter. In the second tournament, he wants to defeat Gohyakumine Bankotsubo because the nose of a tengu can cure any disease. However, after the events of DOA2, he still needed money for the operation (the nose was only a temporary cure), so he joins again in DOA3. His task fulfilled at the end, he no longer joins the DOA tournaments, though he still remains a playable character in later games. In DOA4, he is revealed to be Eliot's teacher, and is the final boss for the latter's story mode. He is only seen at the end of Eliot's chapter in DOA5's story mode, and he is ready to teach Eliot a more advanced kung-fu prior to DOA6.

=== Jann Lee ===
Voiced by (English): unknown actor (DOA2: Hardcore), Darren Criss (Dimensions), Kaiji Tang (DOA5–present)
Voiced by (Japanese): Toshio Furukawa (DOA–DOA4), Nobutoshi Canna (Dimensions–present)

Jann Lee (ジャン・リー, Jan Rī) is a young martial arts expert who joins the Tournaments to show his superior Jeet Kune Do fighting abilities. Jann Lee has never seen the faces of his parents; they died when he was very young and left him an orphan, alone to fend for himself. He lived in poverty, having to wander the streets for food, and faced many hardships. In order to protect himself, Jann Lee learned Jeet Kune Do by watching various martial arts films; especially from Bruce Lee. At first he fought to replace the feelings of loss from when his parents died, but eventually Jann Lee fought purely for the sake of fighting. Eventually, he got skilled enough to get a job as a bouncer at a high-class club. He is met at the first tournament by Leifang, a girl he had saved some six years prior from a gang's attack. In the time since she had become an accomplished martial artist, vowing to prove herself not helpless by defeating Jann Lee in the DOA World Combat Championship. Not satisfied, Jann Lee enters later DOA tournaments to prove his fighting skills and looking to test himself against worthy opponents. Although he loses to Leifang in the fourth tournament, he manages to defeat her in the next one. He later claims the title of winner of the fifth DOA tournament after defeating Hitomi. Although he wins, he is still unsatisfied, and he sets his sights on his new rival: Rig. On the sixth tournament before his final match against Diego starts, Jann Lee finds and defeats Rig; however, he realizes that Rig was not himself, unaware that the latter being brainwashed by MIST. Though Jann Lee was almost bored of being the long-standing champion of DOA, he finally considered Diego, who defeated Jann Lee in an unofficial Round 2, as a worthy rival.

His name, as well as his overall appearance and mannerisms, pays homage to legendary martial artist Bruce Lee (the name "Jann Lee" is directly inspired by Bruce Lee's birth name Lee Jun-Fan (李振藩)). GamesRadar featured him on their article "Kickass Bruce Lee Clones," citing his similarities with Bruce Lee and with one of his shouts featured in famous quotes.

=== Raidou ===
Voiced by (English): Michael McConnohie (Dimensions)
Voiced by (Japanese): Kōji Yada (DOA–DOAU), Tetsu Inada (Dimensions–DOA6)

Raidou (雷道, Raidō) is Ayane and Honoka's biological father, Kasumi and Hayate's uncle, Shiden's older brother, Burai's eldest son, Ayame's brother-in-law, and the main antagonist of the first and sixth Dead or Alive games. A power-hungry shinobi, Raidou sought to master all of the Mugen Tenshin clan's techniques. During his youth, his father trained him and Shiden in the most advanced skills of the Tenjinmon of Mugen Tenshin ninjutsu. As he grew older, his anger and rage became more unstable as Shiden was constantly getting stronger than him, physically, mentally, and spiritually. He also had a lustful eye for Ayame but she was in love with Shiden, which infuriated Raidou further. When Burai refused to let him lead the clan, Raidou became insane with rage and left the village, determined to become the most powerful ninja in history. At some point after his departure, he was involved with an unknown woman in some way, which lead to the conception and birth of Honoka. When he returned to the village while Shiden was away, Raidou raped Ayame (Hayate and Kasumi's mother), who became pregnant with Ayane. As a result, Raidou was banished from his village. Years later, he returned to gain the clan's signature technique, the Torn Sky Blast, and confronts Hayate after easily defeating Ayane. Hayate uses the Torn Sky Blast to attack Raidou, but Raidou counters with his own version of the technique (despite only seeing it once) and defeats Hayate after a brief struggle, knocking him into a coma. Raidou was killed by Kasumi in the first DOA tournament out of revenge for what he did to Hayate, thus deeming her the tournament's winner. He is playable in all console versions of the original Dead or Alive once unlocked. He also appears in DOA Dimensions as an unlockable character. He is later returned in Dead or Alive 5 Last Round (canonically in Dead or Alive 6) as an undead cyber ninja, becoming MIST's secret agent after Donovan retrieved his corpse and orders MIST's newly recruited scientist NICO to remove some of his memories, except his insatiable lust for power, death and revenge. His resurrection requires the powers from his two illegitimate daughters, Ayane and Honoka; this was actually his plan from the beginning of his death all along. Even after being resurrected, he is destroyed by a combined effort of Kasumi, Hayate and Ayane, leaving no trace of him left behind.

=== Zack ===
Portrayed by: Brian J. White
Voiced by (English): unknown actor (DOA2: Hardcore), Dennis Rodman (DOAX), Khary Payton (DOAX2–Dimensions), Keith Silverstein (DOA5–present)
Voiced by (Japanese): Bin Shimada

Zack (ザック, Zakku) is an eccentric DJ who specializes in the muay thai boxing style. After hearing about the tournament, Zack enters to increase his popularity and make a name for himself, and apparently succeeds in that endeavor to an extent. Zack enters the next tournament to please his fans and gain more money, in which he once again succeeds and then returns to his life of leisure. After exhausting all his financial reserves, Zack enters the third tournament to earn more money so that he can enjoy a Las Vegas vacation. However, it is revealed he did not actually win the tournament, but Ayane, who defeated Omega (Genra). Due to Ayane's departure after the tournament, Zack claims the title by default. Shortly afterwards, Zack goes to Las Vegas and using his earnings, bets it all in various casinos. He wins enough money to buy Zack Island, an extravagant private beach resort. He then invites all the women of DOA under the pretense of another tournament, who take the bait and arrive on the island where Zack, accompanied by his girlfriend Niki, convinces them to stay for a brief two-week vacation. Unfortunately, the Zack Island has sunk to the bottom of the ocean. In the fourth tournament, Zack's sights are already set on his next conquest: the DOATEC Tritower, three enormous pillars stretching up to the sky. Unfortunately, the tower catches on fire (as a result of the Mugen Tenshin attack) as Zack is climbing it, but he manages to escape the flames, saving Helena's life in the process. He is then made the winner of the fourth tournament due to his bravery (Helena was the original winner). After finding the treasure of an undead Egyptian pharaoh in DOA4, Zack and Niki use their newfound wealth to form an unexplained contract with extraterrestrials who use a tractor beam to raise Zack Island (now called "New Zack Island") from the ocean floor, allowing Zack and Niki to once again restore it into an island paradise for the ladies of Dead or Alive to come play in. After proposing to Niki, Zack appear to be engulfed in a fiery explosion after a series of flaming meteorites once again destroys the island. However, it is later revealed that he was saved by the ambiguous alien abduction ray in a Deus Ex Machina fashion. Before the fifth tournament, Zack joins Helena as her assistant in the newly reformed DOATEC. He made the official international announcement for the next tournaments and had a new arenas built for them. He personally invited Hitomi, Tina, and Jann Lee to participate in the tournament, although he understands the situations of Diego's mother as the main reason why Diego unable to join in at first. When Kokoro felt conflicted upon learning her connection to her half-sister Helena, Zack helped her out and managed to get her to reconcile with Helena.

In the film DOA: Dead or Alive, Zack is portrayed by Brian J. White, retaining his natural personality. He fights Tina and is defeated by her.

== Introduced in Dead or Alive 2 ==
=== Hayate/Ein ===
Portrayed by: Collin Chou
Voiced by (English): unknown actor (DOA2: Hardcore), Yuri Lowenthal (Dimensions–present)
Voiced by (Japanese): Hikaru Midorikawa

Hayate (ハヤテ) is the oldest child and only son of Shiden and Ayame, the leaders of the Mugen Tenshin ninja clan, and was born to be the next leader of the clan. When Genra requested to Shiden for Ayane, the village's "cursed child", to help him in his duties, Hayate treated the girl with kindness, which most of the clan did not give her. The two formed a strong bond, although Hayate did not know that Ayane was actually his half-sister, conceived when his uncle, the rogue ninja Raidou, raped Ayame when Hayate was only seven years old. Years later, Raidou attacked the Mugen Tenshin Village in an attempt to steal the clan's ninja technique, the Torn Sky Blast. Ayane attacked Raidou to defend Hayate and out of revenge for her birth, but was defeated. Hayate ran to her side, but when Raidou called him a "weakling" for hiding behind a woman, Hayate attacked him in rage, using the Torn Sky Blast to fight Raidou who stole it from him. As both of their attacks collided, the resulting explosion threw Hayate into a tree, cracking his spine and sending him into a coma. During the first Dead or Alive Tournament, Hayate was captured by DOATEC and was made to undergo various experiments as part of "Project Epsilon".

After Project Epsilon was deemed a failure, Hayate was abandoned and was later found in the Black Forest of Germany by Hitomi, whose family took him in. Suffering from amnesia, he was named Ein (アイン, Ain; German for "One") and studied karate under Hitomi's father, later mastering it and became an instructor. He later joins the second Dead or Alive tournament to seek out his forgotten past, encountering many who knew him, including Ayane, Kasumi, Ryu, and Helena; he is eventually bested by Ryu in the tournament, while also recovering his memories through a combat against Kasumi per Ryu's request. However, he and Ryu learn that Ayane's foster father and ninja master, Genra betrays Mugen Tenshin and align with a company who cloned Kasumi, DOATEC. Soon after discovering Kasumi became a nukenin, Hayate and Ayane returned to his home village. In Dead or Alive 3, Hayate was assigned as the new leader of the Mugen Tenshin ninja clan, becoming the 18th leader, succeeding his father. He joins the third tournament to help Ayane and Ryu defeat Omega-empowered Genra. Although he feels it was his duty to defeat Omega Genra as leader of the clan, Hayate is bested by Ayane, who then proceeds to the final round and prepare settle score with her foster father on her own, citing that it was a personal affair. Despite a minor setback when both Christie and Genra set up a trap to lure Ryu into after the former when she kidnapped Irene, Ryu is able to arrive on time to aid Hayate to weaken Genra, allowing Ayane to kill her traitorous foster father. He later returns in Dead or Alive 4 with Hayabusa and Ayane to defeat DOATEC and its latest creation, Alpha-152. He crosses paths with La Mariposa, who reveals that she manipulated them into attacking the Tritower. He appears as the final boss in Hitomi's story mode (as Ein), where he offers to help the latter rebuild her father's dojo if she could beat him in a fight. In the fifth tournament, he and Ayane are asked by Zack to follow Kasumi and assist Helena in her attempt to investigate the newly formed MIST. He encounters a Kasumi clone and kill her. After being freed by Lisa from Rig's trap, he helps the real Kasumi, Hayabusa and Ayane defeat the remaining clones. In the sixth tournament, Hayate is given by Lisa a prototype anti-Epsilon bracelet to prevent the effect from freezing his body, before going to rescue both Honoka and Ayane from being used by MIST to resurrect their father, Raidou. Hayate along with Kasumi and Ayane would later track down the resurrected Raidou who again calls him out for having women accompanying him in a fight. Hayate calls him out for being a traitor and using his abilities for evil purposes. With their combined efforts, the trio destroyed Raidou for good, leaving no trace of him behind.

In the live-action film DOA: Dead or Alive, Hayate is captured by DOATEC after winning that year's DOA competition rather than being captured by DOATEC in his home village. He is meant to test Donovan's newest invention rather than being tested on Project Epsilon and is the reason for Kasumi's entrance in the tournament, much like the first game. Donovan states that Hayate is stronger than Kasumi and that he has a "perfect blend of skill, timing and strength." Hayate and Ayane are also shown as lovers rather than half-siblings. The fighting style he used was eagle claw.

While have yet physically appearing in a modern-era Ninja Gaiden game, he is mentioned in Ninja Gaiden 3. Overhearing Hayabusa was cursed by the Regent of the Mask (a brainwashed Theodore Higgins) into having sword merge with his right arm and slowly hurt him, Hayate sent Ayane to lend his signature sword, Jinrai-Maru to be used by their friend throughout the third entry of modern-era Ninja Gaiden game's chapters.

=== Kasumi Alpha ===
Voiced by (English): Kari Wahlgren (DOAD)
Voiced by (Japanese): Sakura Tange (DOAD)

=== Leon ===
Portrayed by: Silvio Simac
Voiced by (English): unknown actor (DOA2: Hardcore), Richard Epcar (Dimensions–DOA5)
Voiced by (Japanese): Koji Totani (DOA2–DOA4), Jōji Nakata (Dimensions–DOA5)

Leon (レオン, Reon) is an Italian mercenary who, like Bayman, specializes in the combat sambo style of close-quarters combat. While he was on the Silk Road, he met Lauren, a young thief, and fell in love with her. The two were in a loving relationship until Lauren's sudden, tragic death in the desert. As Lauren died in Leon's arms, her final words were: "The man I love is the strongest man in the world." To prove this claim, Leon enters the second DOA tournament, where he fights Zack, who he seemed to have recognized from the past (though Zack does not seem to remember or actually know him), and Gen Fu. He loses in the second tournament, but returns in the third tournament where he encounters Jann Lee. After the events of the third tournament, he returns to the desert oasis where he had buried Lauren, and sees the mirage of his lover who gives him a desert flower before disappearing, indicating that he has fulfilled her expectations. He no longer participates in the DOA tournaments, though he remains a playable character in later installments.

Silvio Simac's portrayal in the live action film has been praised by fans of the games who stated that he portrayed Leon exactly as they wanted.

=== Tengu ===
Voiced by (English): unknown actor (DOA2: Hardcore), Joel Swetow (Dimensions)
Voiced by (Japanese): Osamu Saka

Gohyakumine Bankotsubo (五百峯万骨坊, Gohyakumine Bankotsubō) is a tengu, a mythological creature from Japanese folklore. First appearing in DOA2 as the main antagonist, he escaped to the human world from the Tengu world after murdering his leader, Kuramasan Maouson. He wants chaos to reign over the human world, but is killed by Hayabusa. With his death, it not only brings a good news to the Tengu civilization, but also caught the attention of the said world's princess Nyotengu. He later appears as an unlockable character in DOA Ultimate, DOA4, and DOA Dimensions. It is later revealed in Dimensions that Genra allowed him to escape to the human world.

== Introduced in Dead or Alive 3 ==
=== Brad Wong ===
Portrayed by: Song Lin
Voiced by (English): Grant George (Dimensions–present)
Voiced by (Japanese): Yukimasa Kishino (DOA3–DOA4), Unshō Ishizuka (Dimensions–DOA6)

Brad Wong (ブラッド・ウォン, Buraddo Uon) is a drunken wanderer who specializes in the Zuì Quán fighting style. He embarks on a journey in search of a riddle from his old master Chen, who told him to "bring the legendary drink called Genra." After three years of wandering on his journey, he finds himself in the DOA fighting tournament. After his search for the legendary wine apparently ends after DOA4, he accompanies Eliot, much to Eliot's annoyance.

=== Hitomi ===
Portrayed by: Hung Lin
Voiced by (English): Hynden Walch (DOAX2–DOA Paradise), Eden Riegel (DOA Paradise–present)
Voiced by (Japanese): Yui Horie

Hitomi (ヒトミ) is a Japanese-German girl who practices karate martial arts, she regularly enters the Dead or Alive fighting tournaments either to test her skills against other martial artists, or out of personal reasons.

She was born in Germany to a German father and Japanese mother. She was trained in karate by her father, a martial artist and dojo owner. She is energetic and cheerful, with a longtime commitment to her martial arts studies. Despite her Japanese name, Hitomi identifies more as Western, as her role in the series focuses more on her upbringing with her father while her relationship with her mother is unexplored. Due to this, her name is typically written in Katakana instead of Kanji.

After the events of the original Dead or Alive (1996), Hitomi encounters an amnesiac named "Ein", who had been abandoned by the executive committee of the first tournament. She takes him into her home, and together they practice karate until he departs to enter the second tournament to find out about his past. He gradually regains his memories of being ninja clan leader Hayate, which enables him to return home to his village.

In Dead or Alive 3 (2001), the eighteen-year-old Hitomi (making her playable debut in the series) enters the third DOA tournament simply to prove her skills and independence. While working as a waitress for the Dead or Alive Tournament Executive Committee (DOATEC), she reunites with Ein and meets ninjutsu specialist Ayane, and during this time, Ein reveals the truth about himself to Hitomi. She additionally meets fellow contestant Jann Lee, sharing a keen passion for martial arts, the two shared martial arts philosophies and demonstrated their own martial arts skills, she later chastises him for being too hard on opponents after he brutally defeats Leifang. After Hitomi finishes third, she is allowed to quit the dojo and she transitions into life as an independent adult.

Hitomi is a secret playable character in the 2004 release Dead or Alive Ultimate, but does not appear in the game's story mode. In Dead or Alive 4 (2005), she enters the DOA tournament once more, this time in hopes of winning the cash prize after her father is stricken with an illness that puts a financial strain on the dojo despite his eventual recovery. She defeats Leifang and again faces Jann Lee after he "rescues" her from a T-rex. In the DOATEC Tritower, Hitomi encounters Hayate and pleads for him to return to her father's dojo, admitting that she does not know what to do without his guidance, but Hayate refuses, because he is no longer "Ein", while the fourth tournament is not a competition but a war. In Dead or Alive 5 (2012), Hitomi reunites with Leifang and they train together before going their separate ways. Hitomi defeats Mila in the quarterfinals and Eliot in the semifinals. Before the finals, Hitomi encounters Hayate once again, declaring that she needs to win one more fight and she will be champion. However, she is defeated by Jann Lee in the finals, making her the tournament runner-up.

In Dead or Alive Xtreme Beach Volleyball, Hitomi is invited to Zack Island for the fourth DOA tournament, which turns out to be a ruse concocted by Zack (the island's owner) in order to lure the girls of DOA into a two-week tropical vacation. In the sequel Dead or Alive Xtreme 2, Hitomi returns to the island to participate in the fifth tournament after being deceived again into a false invitation from Zack. In Dead or Alive Xtreme 3, Hitomi returns to New Zack Island after the fifth tournament to get distracted itself and have some fun before returning to her training for the next tournament.

Hitomi has a cameo in the 2006 live-action film DOA: Dead or Alive, played by Hung Lin. In the movie, a character resembling Hitomi is seen wearing her in-game outfit of a pink headband and a denim jacket, but she had no dialogue while her personality was given to Dead or Alive 4 protagonist Helena Douglas. Hitomi also appeared in the Ninja Gaiden series' smartphone action card game Hyakuman-nin no Ninja Gaiden (in a ninja version with a sword) in 2013 and her card was included in Sega's Samurai & Dragons game that same year.

=== Genra/Omega ===
Voiced by (English): Andrew Kishino (Dimensions)
Voiced by (Japanese): Osamu Saka

Genra (幻羅) was Ayane's foster father and the leader of Mugen Tenshin's Hajin Mon ninja. He was the one who sent Ayane after Kasumi after the latter left the clan in order to avenge Hayate. In Dead or Alive 3, he was the main antagonist, used as a test subject by DOATEC for Project Omega, transforming him into the superhuman Omega (オメガ). As Omega, he appears as a hulking figure fully clad in dark samurai armor, and wields a tokkosho sword. Unlike most matches in the Dead or Alive series, his battles are fought at an obscure camera angle. In Dead or Alive: Dimensions, Genra is featured as a boss character and as an unlockable character, and the stage's camera where he is the final boss in the third game no longer obscure. In the game's Chronicle Mode, it is revealed that he willingly gave himself over to DOATEC, particularly his accomplish, Victor Donovan to become stronger, revealing his cruel and power-hungry personality. It is also revealed that he allowed Bankotsubo, the Tengu, to pass through human world. He was finally defeated and killed by Ayane (with aid from Hayabusa and Hayate, as revealed in Dimensions), who later ritually cremates him, taking his tokkosho. His appearances in the games are portrayed with his face obscured, usually with a wooden mask.

== Introduced in Dead or Alive Xtreme Beach Volleyball ==
=== Lisa Hamilton/La Mariposa ===
Voiced by (English): Masasa Moyo (DOAX2–Dimensions)
Voiced by (Japanese): Maaya Sakamoto

Lisa Hamilton (リサ・ハミルトン, Risa Hamiruton) is a young Hispanic woman who first appears in Dead or Alive Xtreme Beach Volleyball, being hired by Zack as Zack Island's holiday representative. Prior to her appearance, she was once the lead scientist at DOATEC, being involved in the Epsilon Project. However she released Hayate. She then left DOATEC for a job as a stockbroker, though she still remains affiliated to DOATEC as its lead scientist for Project Alpha. Lisa is very sociable, getting along with everyone, including Ayane and Christie. She also seems to be a bit of a workaholic, evident by her multiple jobs, and the fact that she is almost always seen doing some form of work. Her multiple careers and job-changing is a trait she shares with Tina, her best friend from her high school days. In Dead or Alive 4, she appears as a masked luchadora named La Mariposa (ラ・マリポーサ, Ra Maripōsa; Spanish for "butterfly"), entering the tournament to match her wrestling skills against Tina's. She also confronts Hayate, revealing to him that she had manipulated him into destroying DOATEC. Also, in a cutscene involving her talking to Helena, she has shown to have some form of resentment with the company, specifically with Donovan's motives. She finally teams up with Tina to defeat a rival wrestling team at the end of her story mode, revealing her true identity in the process. In Dead or Alive 5, it is revealed that she is an operative for Donovan's new organization, MIST. In the game's true ending, after she frees Hayate and the Mugen Tenshin ninja and Hayabusa destroy the lab, she is trapped under some debris and her scream can be heard in the following explosion. Thankfully, she survived manage to get out of MIST's oil rig hideout as of Dead or Alive 6, and was "replaced" by NiCO. Before the sixth tournament, Lisa also prepared a prototype anti-Epsilon brace to prevent the Epsilon cells freezing Hayate's body for a limited time during his encounter with one of the MIST agents.

== Introduced in Dead or Alive 4 ==
=== Alpha-152 ===
Voiced by (English): Amanda Troop (DOAD)
Voiced by (Japanese): Kaori Takeda (DOA4), Sakura Tange (DOAD)

=== Eliot ===
Voiced by (English): Rolland Lopez (Dimensions), David Vincent (DOA5–present)
Voiced by (Japanese): Junko Minagawa

Eliot (エリオット, Eriotto) is a high school boy from Britain and the sole apprentice to Gen Fu. He joins the fourth DOA tournament, very determined to prove to himself that he is worthy of being the successor. He is also revealed to be uncertain of why Gen Fu would choose him as his successor, seen while talking to Brad Wong. He later faces Gen Fu at the end of his story mode, and defeats him, proving his worth. He decides to enter the fifth tournament, and Brad follows him. He is eliminated in the semifinals after losing to Hitomi, and he is now ready to learn xinyi liuhe quan, as taught by Gen Fu. His principle outfits are usually traditional kung fu uniforms, though he also wears modern Western fashions. His fighting style is xing yi quan, until he obtain the xinyi liuhe quan as of DOA6.

=== Kokoro ===
Voiced by (English): Kathryn Feller (DOAX2–Dimensions), Heather Hogan-Watson (DOA5–present)
Voiced by (Japanese): Ayako Kawasumi

Kokoro (こころ, "heart") is a Japanese girl that uses the bajiquan fighting style. Her mother Miyako, was a DOATEC official and one of Fame Douglas' many mistresses, and after Kokoro's birth, Miyako and her child moved to the country. Kokoro began training to be a geisha, but her heart was actually in both training to be a geisha and martial arts. She asked her mother if she could participate in the fourth Dead or Alive tournament, and she hesitantly accepted, but also says a statement indicating she could possibly meet someone of significance ("blood is thicker than water"). After several rounds of the tournament, Kokoro meets the DOATEC heiress Helena, who, unbeknownst to Kokoro, is her half-sister, up until she learned in their connections in the sixth tournament from MIST scientist NiCO, and eventually get warmed up from the conflict of this revelation thanks to Zack, reconciling with her sister. Kokoro's CG ending shows her returning home to pursue her geisha training once again, doing things like fan dancing and playing the shamisen and taiko drum. After she and her mother move to Tokyo for her mother's business, Kokoro sees Helena's announcement for the next tournament, in which she loses to Eliot in the quarterfinals.

Kokoro is one of the original nine qualified characters in Dead or Alive Xtreme 3.

=== Nicole/SPARTAN-458 ===
Voiced by: Lyssa Browne

Nicole (ニコール, Nikōru) (codenamed "SPARTAN-458") is the result of the collaboration between Tecmo's Team Ninja and Microsoft's Bungie. Team Ninja originally asked Bungie for permission to use the Master Chief, which Bungie claimed would be impossible due to storyline restrictions. But the staff at Bungie were intrigued with the idea and wanted to try something similar. As a result, Bungie developed the concept of a Spartan not entirely connected to the Halo storyline who could conveniently and somewhat plausibly be fit into the Dead or Alive universe. This concept evolved into the character of Nicole. Nearly all of the resources for her design came straight from Halo 2 game data. The data was modified to work in the Dead or Alive game engine as a female combatant, but kept to the traditional Spartan design; a feminine figure would have been implausible for such a heavily armored, cybernetically enhanced individual. According to Nicole's fictional backstory, she is born in the Martian city of Legaspi in 2531. This, however, seems unlikely as the SPARTAN-II program used children of the age of 6 and born in 2511 (however it is possible as it is believed that there was a second class of Spartan-IIs). Members of the UNSC Office of Naval Intelligence (ONI) kidnap her at the age of six and enroll her in the SPARTAN-II Project, an initiative designed to develop the "Spartan" series of supersoldiers; this is the same program that the Master Chief, and other Spartans from the Halo series undergo. Bungie explained Nicole's presence in the Dead or Alive setting of the 21st century in an article that revealed the character's background. The studio stated that the character, who has never appeared in any other Halo fiction, is sent to the 21st century when a partially stable "bubble" in the space-time continuum opens near Nassau Station, where she and her unit are preparing for a secret mission. This "bubble" is created when Apocalypso, an ONI stealth vehicle, interacts with real-space, as a result of an unusual slipspace incident. This incident traps Nicole in the 21st century. While waiting for the bubble to collapse, which she hopes will enable her to return to the future, she battles any member of the DOA cast to arrive at the station, protecting its classified information. To keep the space-time continuum stable, she avoids lethal force in executing her current task.

Nicole's fighting style is very quick and powerful, a variation of standard military close quarters combat. Her move list contains moves of other characters in the game; her fighting style is a hybrid of Leon and Bayman's movesets to create a blend of striking combos and throws. Her style meant to incapacitate an armed opponent in a matter of seconds and take advantage of her enhanced strength, as well as to exploit any environmental advantages. She is described as having great speed despite her large size. Many of her moves allude to the Halo universe, with names such as "The Great Journey" and "The Grunt Punt"; the former is a powerful move that sends an opponent down stairs or off a ledge. Also in Nicole's repertoire are several technologies from Halo, including active camouflage, represented by her taunt and rendering her nearly invisible, and the plasma grenade, represented by a command throw. She speaks English and Japanese. Previews of Dead or Alive 4 showed a Spartan among the game's characters; this attracted attention and curiosity regarding whether such a character would appear fully functional in the final version of the game. The character's moves, all of which were homages to the Halo series, and the inclusion of a Halo-based level were positively described in pre-release reviews. Bungie returned the favor, and in the release of Halo 3 there is an armor type called Hayabusa, for which its design is based on Ryu Hayabusa's appearance.

== Introduced in Dead or Alive: Dimensions ==
=== Shiden ===
Voiced by (English): Lloyd Sherr
Voiced by (Japanese): Yukitoshi Hori

Shiden (紫電) is Kasumi and Hayate's father, Ayame's husband, Raidou's younger brother, the biological uncle of Ayane and Honoka, Burai's younger son, and the former leader of the Mugen Tenshin Ninja Clan. When he was a member of the Mugen Tenshin Ninja Clan, he and Raidou were trained by their father in the most advanced skills of the Tenjinmon of Mugen Tenshin ninjutsu. Over the years, he became a physically, mentally, and spiritually stronger ninja than Raidou and eventually became the clan's 17th leader, succeeding their father Burai who was the 16th leader. This led to Raidou's departure from village out of jealously and rage. Shiden was furious at Raidou for raping his wife while he was away, and denounced him as his brother. The result of the rape led to the birth of his niece, Ayane. Years later, when Raidou returned and attacked the villagers, Shiden was bitter at Radiou for crippling his son Hayate which led to Hayate's comatic state. Shiden made the decision to have is daughter Kasumi take Hayate's place as heir to the head of the clan. Shiden kept the truth about Hayate's attacker a secret from Kasumi, worried that she would succumb to her emotions and seek Raidou out, but the attempt was in vain as Kasumi would learn the truth and left the village. After Hayate recovered from his coma, Shiden was filled with joy, and his position of leadership was ceded to Hayate in DOA3. Shiden was mentioned in the first Dead or Alive and later made his first physical appearance in Dead or Alive Ultimate. He later appears as a boss and playable character in Dead or Alive: Dimensions.

== Introduced in Dead or Alive 5 ==
In addition to the following, the game featured several guest characters from other fighting games, such as Akira Yuki, Pai Chan, Sarah Bryant and Jacky Bryant from Sega's Virtua Fighter series, as well as Mai Shiranui from SNK's Fatal Fury and The King of Fighters series. Another clone of Kasumi called "Phase 4" was also introduced in the title.

=== Mila ===
Voiced by (English): uncredited actress (DOA5), Amber Connor (DOA6)
Voiced by (Japanese): Ryoko Shiraishi

Mila (ミラ, Mira) is an up-and-coming mixed martial arts Spanish champion who has scored spectacular victories all over the world. She spends her days training at the gym in between shifts at her part-time job, honing her skills as a lightning fast, orthodox striker with a strong follow-up ground game. She also feels intense admiration for a certain fighter, and she has entered the fifth Dead or Alive Tournament to follow her dream of taking on her idol in the ring. Some days after an exhibition match with Tina, she loses in the quarterfinals to Hitomi, as Tina also lost as well, by her own father, Bass (as Mr. Strong). In the sixth tournament however, she finally won against Bass at the round of 16. Mila is one of the few people aside Zack who worried about Diego's situation with his ill-mother.

During a vote for the release of Dead or Alive Xtreme 3, Mila was voted at 12th rank and amongst unqualified girls at the initial release of the game. Later, according to weekly Famitsu magazine on the final poll result of Dead or Alive Xtreme Venus Vacation 4th anniversary on November 18, 2021, Mila is one of the top three remaining mainline fighters alongside Tina and NiCO to be first qualify to appear in the said gacha game, with Mila is ranked at the 3rd, behind both NiCO (1st rank) and Tina (2nd rank).

=== Momiji ===
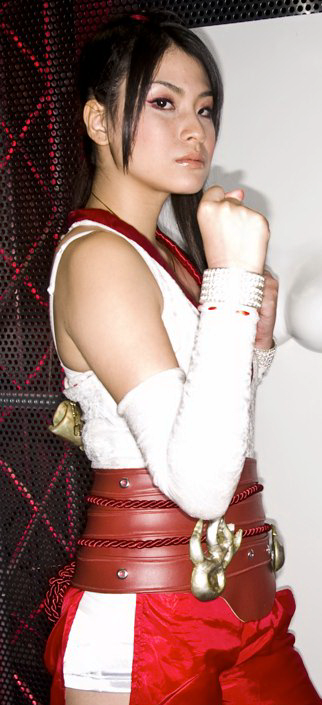
A promotional model for Momiji in Ninja Gaiden Sigma 2 at Tokyo Game Show 2009

Voiced by (English): Kate Higgins
Voiced by (Japanese): Yūko Minaguchi (all appearances except Yaiba: Ninja Gaiden), Shino Kakinuma (Yaiba: Ninja Gaiden)

Momiji (紅葉) (meaning "Autumn leaves") is a young female ninja from the Hayabusa Village and a shrine maiden who practices Hayabusa style of ninjutsu and aikijutsu martial arts. She was introduced as a supporting playable character in 2008's action game Ninja Gaiden: Dragon Sword.

In the Ninja Gaiden series, she was raised to be Hayabusa ninja clan's Dragon Shrine Maiden like her older sister Kureha who was Ryu's childhood friend. She is both a shinobi (ninja) and a miko (shamanistic shrine maiden) who was tasked with keeping the ancient relics passed down the Hayabusa village from the ancient Dragon Lineage and carrying out the Shrine Maiden's rites and rituals to purify the world of evil forces. Among the relics that the maidens were tasked with guarding is the Eye of the Dragon, a jewel said to contain the souls of the ancient Dragons. Kureha was killed when the village was attacked in 2004's Ninja Gaiden and the devastated Momiji began training under Ryu as a precaution, becoming a skilled kunoichi along with her shrine maiden duties and abilities. Since then she supports and follows her master whenever he comes around. Momiji is a very gentle and caring young woman who is seen as an older sister figure by all of the village's children, including the boy Sanji. Like her mentor Ryu Hayabusa, Momiji trains extensively to become one of the deadliest warriors in the Hayabusa village.

In 2008's Ninja Gaiden: Dragon Sword, Momiji is normally playable only in the game's first chapter, but it is possible to play her through the entire game after unlocking the special difficulty setting "The Way of Kunoichi", which becomes accessible if the player manages to win the unfair boss fight at the end Momiji's chapter. After her session of training with Ryu, Momiji stays behind to pick flowers for Kureha's grave where she is attacked by the Black Spider clan and eventually captured by the fiendish Red Dragon. She is interrogated by Black Spider's Obaba for the Eye of the Dragon but turns out she managed to fuse the jewel into her soul, preventing Obaba from killing her. The Fiends' leader Ishtaros plans to use the captive Momiji to lure Ryu and kill him. During the battle between Ryu and Ishtaros at the Gates of Hell, Ryu is overwhelmed by the Dark Dragonstones' power but the ghost of Kureha appears and draws out Momiji's soul. Together they release the Eye and imbue the Dragon Sword with its power, allowing it to become the True Dragon Sword that Ryu uses to defeat Ishtaros. Nicchae, the Greater Fiend of Destruction and Ishtaros's twin, appears and takes Momiji, Ishtaros' body and the eight Dark Dragonstones deeper into Hell in an attempt to reawaken the Vigoor Emperor. Nicchae's plan ends in failure as the Dark Dragon consumes the Emperor and Ishtaros before bursting forth to threaten the world once again. Ryu defeats the Dark Dragon with the True Dragon Sword, and Momiji is finally rescued. Afterwards, Momiji mourns Kureha alongside the children of the village and makes a vow at Kureha's grave to become stronger so she can defend herself and the village. She leaves Ryu a letter as she departs to train in her travels.

Momiji returns as a playable character in Ninja Gaiden Sigma 2. While Ryu is away at Tokyo, the Hayabusa village is invaded once again by the Black Spider clan. As Jo battles Genshin, Momiji rallies the Hayabusa ninjas to protect the rest of the villagers. Ryu later returns to the village and repels the invasion, killing almost all the invading Black Spider ninjas. Momiji soon realizes that Sanji has been taken captive, prompting her to go rescue him. As she travels to Tokyo, she encounters one of the Tengu Brothers and soundly defeats him. This leads her to Sanji, who is being held prisoner by both brothers. After her victorious battle, she reassures Sanji that she will always look out for him until he becomes a master ninja. As they return home, they are unknowingly saved by Muramasa, who kills a Black Spider ninja who is about to shoot an arrow at them. Momiji is also featured in the spin-off title ZEN Pinball: Ninja Gaiden Sigma 2.

In Ninja Gaiden 3, after Sanji finds Ryu unconscious outside and brings him to Momiji, she watches over him and helps him recover. During his journey to find his father in the shrine, she assists him in dealing with the Grip of Murder curse while helping him defeat the Black Spider ninja clan. Whenever the curse almost takes complete control over Ryu, Momiji uses her power to protect his mind and help him regain his senses. As they get near to the shrine, they are attacked by Obaba, but they manage to defeat her. Near the end of the battle, Momiji is knocked unconscious by Obaba, but Ryu manages to save her and brings her to the shrine to be taken care of by his father. When Canna attacks Tokyo as the Goddess and Ryu begins to become overwhelmed by Fiends, Momiji and Jo arrive just in time to save him. She gives her master the Eye of the Dragon before he departs, leaving her and his father to fight off the surrounding foes.

Momiji became playable again in the NG3 update Ninja Gaiden 3: Razor's Edge. She makes an appearance in the spin-off game Yaiba: Ninja Gaiden Z, as an ally and love interest of Ryu, who is an antagonist in the game. She arrives to give the Eye of the Dragon to him, and then Ryu saves her from peril. Her card also appears in mobile game Ninja Gaiden Clans.

In the fighting games Dead or Alive 5 Ultimate and Dead or Alive 5 Last Round, Momiji joins the DOA tournament in order to put what she has learned to the test. She is one of the nine playable female characters in the DOA sport spin-off title Dead or Alive Xtreme 3. In September 2019, Momiji was added as a downloadable content character to Dead or Alive 6.

Momiji makes playable appearances in the Wii U edition of Warriors Orochi 3 (Warriors Orochi 3 Hyper), including in the game's duel mode, and later in Warriors Orochi 3 Ultimate. Previously she has made an unplayable guest appearance in the Warriors series in Dynasty Warriors: Strikeforce for the PlayStation 3, where she gives a series of quests to the player character who can earn the right to wield her "Heavenly Dragon" naginata in battle.

=== Naotora Ii ===
Voiced by (English): Erica Mendez
Voiced by (Japanese): Yuka Saitō

Naotora Ii (井伊 直虎, Ii Naotora) is a guest character from Tecmo Koei's Samurai Warriors (Sengoku Musou) series, mainly based on her appearance from Samurai Warriors 4. In Dead or Alive 5: Last Round, Naotora was sent into the present day due to one of Victor Donovan's MIST time travelling experiments. Naotora is the ruler of Japan's Warring States era Ii Clan; she has no choice but to fight for life under the Ii name and keep the motto of her family: "once on the battlefield, one must face the enemy head on" in mind. A determined Naotora sets out to emerge victorious from this strange new challenge.

=== Nyotengu ===
Voiced by (English): Brina Palencia
Voiced by (Japanese): Akemi Satō

Nyotengu (女天狗) is a female tengu from the mountains of Japan. Nyotengu practices tengu-do, a unique fighting style passed down for ages. She is the princess of the tengu world who comes to the human world to seek out Ryu Hayabusa and test his strength for his reputation on ending Bankotsubo's life of crime. As Hayabusa proves his strength to her and spare her life as well, Nyotengu is finally satisfied. She made an unofficial guest star in the sixth tournament in an unofficial "half-time" battle.

Nyotengu is a DLC character in the retail version of DOA5 Ultimate, and later included in Dead or Alive 5 Last Round. She is also playable in DOAX3. She was furthermore added to DOA6 as a bonus character despite tight budget and schedule due to the designers' preference for her.

A character known as "Ancient Nyotengu", based on Dead or Alive's Nyotengu appears as a DLC side boss in Nioh 2.

=== Rachel ===
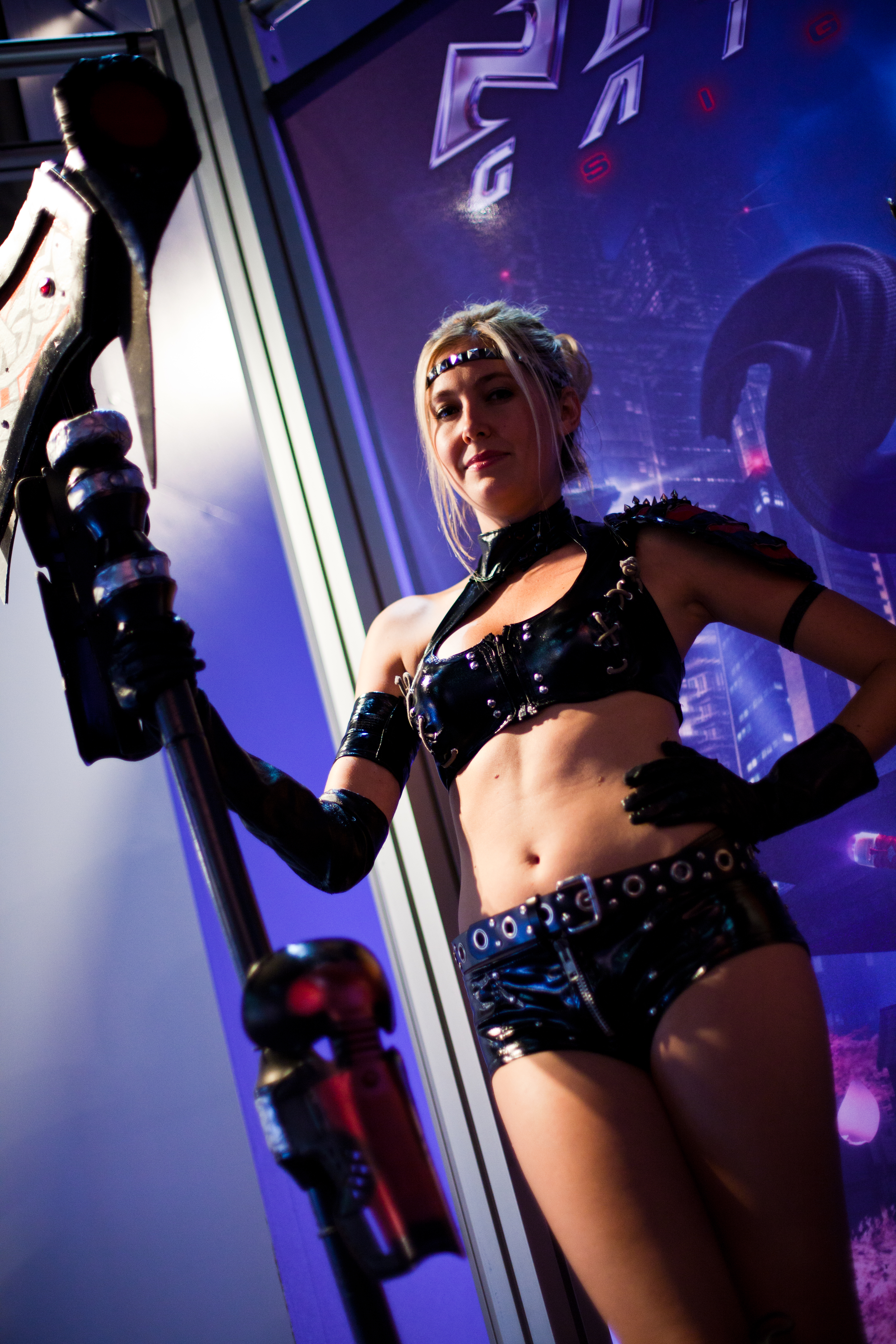
A model playing Rachel at E3 2009

Voiced by (English): Tara Strong (Ninja Gaiden–Ninja Gaiden 2), Erin Fitzgerald (DOA5U), uncredited actress (DOA6)
Voiced by (Japanese): Michie Tomizawa

Rachel (レイチェル, Reicheru) is a female Vigoorian demon/human hybrid and a fiend hunter which she practices counter fiend combat fighting style. She was introduced as an unplayable character in the 2004's action game Ninja Gaiden.

In the Ninja Gaiden series, she meets Ryu in the Holy Vigoor Empire, where she is on a mission to destroy the fiends, as well as find her missing sister, Alma, who has become a Greater Fiend. Soon after they first meet, she is captured but soon saved by Ryu. After the battle, she stays with Ayane to recover from her ordeal. She later leaves to search for Alma and follows Doku's spirit through the torn fabric of space and time. She then fights Ishtaros and Nicchae. Despite her best efforts, she is defeated and held captive again. Doku plans to use Rachel as a sacrifice for Alma's awakening. After Ryu wins, Doku is about to kill Rachel, but Alma rush in to protect her sister, taking the fatal blow, and dies in Rachel's arms. Rachel helps Ryu escape the Underworld and witnesses the battle between him and Murai. The remake Ninja Gaiden Sigma tells some the events from her perspective and shows how her actions affected the main plot.

Rachel returns in Ninja Gaiden Sigma 2. In her own chapter, after Ryu and the CIA agent Sonia left Manhattan, Marbus takes over with the disappearance of the Statue of Liberty, resulting in a Fiend infestation. Rachel appears and braves through the hellish night slaying Fiends until she confronts Marbus atop a skyscraper. Rachel defeated Marbus, taking off his other horn and killing him.

Rachel made her first fighting game appearance in Dead or Alive 5 Ultimate and Dead or Alive 5 Last Round, and returned to the series in Dead or Alive 6 as a post-release downloadable content character. She also appears in the crowd-fighting games Musou Orochi 2 Special and Warriors Orochi 3 (including in the game's duel mode), and in the smart phone action card game Hyakuman-nin no Ninja Gaiden. Her costume is available in Super Swing Golf Season 2 and a 1/6 scale PVC figure of Rachel was released by Kotobukiya in 2006.

=== Rig ===
Voiced by (English): Kyle Hebert (DOA6)
Voiced by (Japanese): Hiroki Tōchi

Rig (リグ, Rigu) is a natural born fighter. He has used his powerful instincts to master of the art of taekwondo. He has run the oil rig from a young age, and his colleagues simply call him "Rig". But even he does not know his real name or where he comes from. He learned taekwondo on the oil rig, which led him to create his own style, with plenty of moves he came up with himself. Through playing story mode in Dead or Alive 5, it soon becomes apparent that Rig knows more about his identity than he lets on, but ended up twisted in Dead or Alive 6, as he is indeed never knew who he was and how he became evil at the end of 5th game is explained. Upon meeting MIST's undercover agent Christie, Rig was unaware that she was sent to implant him with a mind control device in his body, creating an evil persona known as Victor Donovan Jr.. Even after losing to Kasumi in a fight in the lab, in the 5th game's extra cutscene, the brainwashed Rig reveals to Donovan that Phase 4 is according to plan and ready to be mass-produced before recently being released from his brainwashed state and soon finding out the oil platform he live is somehow destroyed, with Rig being offered by his best friend Bass to live with him.

Before the sixth tournament starts, Rig overhears Mila and Zack's about the situation which a street fighter Diego is in, relating to his ill-mother, and manage to convince the latter to join the tournament for their sake. Rig also the one who handles the promotion of Armstrong wrestling family and Mila for the wrestling tournament. While in a middle of cheering the sixth tournament battles, Rig ended up being brainwashed by Christie twice. Rig's disappearance and why the Mugen Tenshin and Hayabusa ninja clans are after him cause Bass to worry about his situation.

== Introduced in Dead or Alive Xtreme Venus Vacation ==
=== Amy ===
Voiced by: Sayumi Suzushiro

Amy (エイミー, Eimī) is an 18-year-old graduate student who was contracted to do IT work at the Venus Islands. After a misunderstanding during their first meeting, she adopts a tsundere attitude towards the Owner. Amy was added to Venus Vacation as the game's 26th character in April 2022.

=== Azusa ===
Voiced by: Sarah Emi Bridcutt

Azusa (あずさ) is a tomboyish 20-year-old biker and part-time worker of a family-owned diner. She arrives to the Venus Islands after becoming a fan of Tsukushi's manga and seeking its author. Azusa was added to Venus Vacation as the game's 32nd character in June 2025.

=== Elise ===
Voiced by: Asami Seto

Elise (エリーゼ, Erīze) is a serious 22-year-old life coach sent to the Venus Islands by management to oversee the Owner; eventually she joins the festival as a participant. Elise was added to Venus Vacation as its 23rd character in July 2021. She was also confirmed as the 3rd character to join Venus Vacation Prism on October 14, 2024.

=== Fiona ===
Voiced by: Kaede Hondo

Fiona (フィオナ) is an 18-year-old princess who joins the Venus Festival out of admiration of the Owner. Due to her sheltered upbringing, she is rather naïve about the world. She was added to Venus Vacation as its 14th character in September 2018. Fiona was confirmed as the 2nd character to join Venus Vacation Prism on October 7, 2024.

=== Kanna ===
Voiced by: Naomi Ōzora

Kanna (カンナ) is a 1,014-years-old oni who openly plans to subdue the boss and take over the Venus Islands with her supernatural powers. Prone to self-sabotage, she's is also a rival of Nyotengu. Kanna was added to Venus Vacation as the game's 16th character in April 2019.

=== Koharu ===
Voiced by: Maria Naganawa

Koharu (こはる) is a diligent 18-year-old aspiring innkeeper who goes to the Venus Islands to manage its newly opened onsen. She was added to Venus Vacation as its 24rd character in November 2021.

=== Luna ===
Voiced by: Shiori Mikami

Luna (ルナ, Runa) is an eccentric 18-year-old scholar who wants to investigate the surrounding area within the Venus Islands. She really likes eating roasted sweet potatoes and went to the same graduate school as Amy, though they did not interact much. Luna was added to Venus Vacation as the first post-launch character (and 11th overall) in January 2018. Luna made a guest appearance in Azur Lane as part of the Vacation Lane collaboration's second wave that took place between April 27 to May 11, 2023.

=== Lobelia ===
Voiced by: Aoi Koga

Lobelia (ロベリア, Roberia) is an 18-year-old noble and Fiona's childhood friend. She visits the Venus Island to see her but then decides to stay after seeing Fiona and the Owner spending time together. Lobelia was added to Venus Vacation as the game's 21st character in December 2020.

=== Meg ===
Voiced by: Miyu Tomita

Meg (メグ, Megu) is a laid-back 19-year-old waitress who usually likes to eat ice cream bars in her free time. Originally conceived as a naughty character, she was toned down to a mischievous accomplice to the player instead according to producer Sakuda. Meg was added to Venus Vacation as the game's 31st character in August 2024. Her reception by players was mixed due to releasing too close to the previous character, Reika.

=== Misaki ===
Voiced by: Minami Tsuda

Misaki (みさき) is the 18-year-old part time assistant to the Owner. She is a cheerful and energetic girl who turns shy when it comes to expressing her feelings. Misaki was announced as the first exclusive character to Dead or Alive Venus Vacation prior to the game's release.

Misaki made a guest appearance in Azur Lane as part of the Vacation Lane collaboration.

=== Monica ===
Voiced by: Eri Yukimura

Monica (モニカ, Monika) is a 19-year-old aspiring croupier who came to the Venus Islands in hopes to be hired to the island's casino. She likes challenging the Owner to luck-based contests. Monica was added to Venus Vacation as the game's 17th character in August 2019. Monica made a guest appearance in Azur Lane as part of the Vacation Lane collaboration.

=== Nagisa ===
Voiced by: Maaya Uchida

Nagisa (なぎさ) is a 20-year-old stage actress and Misaki's big sister. She came to the Venus Islands to take her younger sister home due to viewing the Owner as a lecherous boss taking advantage of her. Nagisa was added to Venus Vacation as the game's 15th character in December 2018. Nagisa made a guest appearance in Azur Lane as part of the Vacation Lane collaboration.

=== Nanami ===
Voiced by: Miyuri Shimabukuro

Nanami (ななみ) is an 18-year-old high school girl and childhood friend of Misaki, who is implied to have been scouted by Zack to join the Venus Festival. She was added to Venus Vacation as its 22rd character in April 2021. Nanami was also confirmed as the 6th and final character to join Venus Vacation Prism on November 1, 2024.

=== Nozomi ===
Voiced by: Niina Hanamiya

Nozomi (のぞみ) is an attentive 20-year-old intern and kōhai of the Owner. She arrives to the Venus Islands to learn how to manage festival duties and ends up joining as a Venus in the process. Nozomi was added to Venus Vacation as the game's 33rd character in February 2026.

=== Patty ===
Voiced by: Marika Kōno

Patty (パティ, Pati) is a 19-year-old girl who hails from the same archipelago where the Venus Islands are located. She stumbled upon the Venus Festival while looking for her lost radio. Patty has a keen sense of smell and tends to judge people's character based on how they smell. She was added to Venus Vacation as the game's 19th character in April 2020.

=== Reika ===
Voiced by: Reina Kondō

Reika (れいか) is an 18-year-old part-time lifeguard at the Venus Islands who is also a competitive swimmer going through a slump. She was the first post-launch character to be added to all regions simultaneously in June 2024 as the game's 30th character. She was released simultaneously to both versions to avoid potentially upsetting Japanese players due to a delayed character release.

Reika is the first character created entirely by the Venus Vacation international team at Koei Tecmo Singapore. She was given an aloof and distant attitude where her appeal comes from being "hard to get". Producer Sakuda commented how Japanese players were initially more receptive of these characteristics due to their familiarity with tsundere-type characters in Japanese media.

=== Sayuri ===
Voiced by: Azumi Waki

Sayuri (さゆり) is a kind 24-year-old nurse who applies for a vacant position at the Venus Island. Upon her arrival, she was invited by the Owner to also participate in the Venus Festival. Sayuri was added to Venus Vacation as the game's 18th character in December 2019.

=== Shandy ===
Voiced by: Shino Shimoji

Shandy (シャンディ, Shandi) is an ennui-prone 21-year-old bartender who goes to the Venus Islands looking for thrilling experiences and ends up working at the island's bar. Shandy was added to Venus Vacation as the game's 27th character in August 2022.

=== Shizuku ===
Voiced by: Hina Yōmiya

Shizuku (しずく) is a timid 19-year-old kitsune who claims to be a cosplayer to hide her real identity. She was added to Venus Vacation as the game's 29th character in October 2023.

=== Tsukushi ===
Voiced by: Maria Sashide

Tsukushi (つくし) is an awkward 18-year-old aspiring mangaka who went to the Venus Islands to observe the participants and use them as reference material for her bishōjo works. She was added to Venus Vacation as the game's 20th character in August 2020.

=== Yukino ===
Voiced by: Kaori Maeda

Yukino (ゆきの) is an outgoing 18-year-old gyaru who likes to takes selfies and share them on social media. She is a huge fan of Tamaki and her reason for participating in the Venus Festival is to meet her. Yukino was added to Venus Vacation as the game's 28th character in February 2023.

== Introduced in Dead or Alive 6 ==
In addition to Mai Shiranui returning as a guest character, Kula Diamond made her debut as a second guest from The King of Fighters XIV.

=== Diego ===
Voiced by (English): D. C. Douglas
Voiced by (Japanese): Hiroki Yasumoto

Diego (ヂエゴ) is a Mexican-American street fighter who grew up in the back alleys of the New York City. Diego started entering street matches to win money to support his ill mother, and quickly became known as New York's "uncrowned street hero." After declining to enter the sixth Dead or Alive tournament multiple times, Diego is finally convinced by Rig, as well as Diego's mother. Although he is officially a runner-up after being defeated by fifth tournament champion Jann Lee, Diego won an unofficial round 2, earning Jann Lee his respect as a worthy rival, just as both fighters becomes exhausted from the battle.

According to the DOA6 director and producer Yohei Shimbori, for Diego they "wanted an American fighter between the ages of 25 and 35 to whom the public could relate. This [American] audience is less fond of styles like kung fu, they prefer a street fighter." According to designer Tom Lee, Diego was created specifically to give representation to the Hispanic community in America as well as appealing to American sensibilities. Diego was ultimately created from three different ideas presented by Lee.

=== NiCO ===
Voiced by (English): Faye Mata
Voiced by (Japanese): Sumire Uesaka

NiCO (ニコ, Niko) is an 18-year-old light blue-haired Finnish scientist who works for MIST and a fighter who utilizes both silat and electro-technomancy, powered by the technological rings that allow her to use long-ranged electric and teleportation attacks. She was responsible for resurrecting Raidou as a cyborg, with two of his daughters, Honoka and Ayane, as the keys to this process. As NiCO had never been loyal to MIST, she allowed herself to be recruited just to use them and Raidou's resurrection as stepping stones for the sake of resurrecting her own father. She also appears to have an interest in resurrecting Helena's mother Maria; however, Helena disapproves of the young scientist's plan to resurrect her mother and NiCO's father.

Yohei Shimbori said she "was created for anime fans around the world. We made her cute but also very smart, she's a scientist, all that in order to make her cool." Shimbori said her fighting style was inspired by him watching the Indonesian film The Raid. Previously he said NiCO has been created primarily for the Japanese and Asian markets, influenced by anime and light novels. She was at first supposed to be a Russian; her Japanese voice actor Sumire Uesaka was originally chosen for her Russian language skills. He also said that he initially wanted her to look even younger than Marie does. According to Weekly Famitsu Magazine on the final poll results of Dead or Alive Xtreme Venus Vacation 4th anniversary on November 18, 2021, NiCO is one of the top three remaining mainline fighters alongside Tina and Mila to be first qualify to return in the said gacha game, with NiCO is ranked at the 1st.

NiCO has pale skin, green eyes, glasses and light blue short hair.

=== Minato ===
Voiced by (English): Suzie Yeung
Voiced by (Japanese): Shion Wakayama

Minato (みなと) is a 18-year-old highschool student from Tokyo. She's a gifted dancer who was hired by NiCO to run an experiment involving special contact lenses. Through them, Minato can mimic the moves of other combatants and incorporate them as part of her dance.

== Other characters ==
=== Alicia Armstrong ===
Alicia Armstrong (アリシア・アームストロング, Arishia Āmusutrongu) is Bass Armstrong's wife and Tina's mother. She died sometimes after being diagnosed with an unknown illness when Tina was six years old, forcing Bass to raise her by himself. In one of Bass' cutscenes in DOA4, when Tina is thanking people to her interviewers, she thanks Alicia.

=== Anne ===
Anne (アンネ) is a German woman and the former mistress of Fame Douglas. She was murdered at gun point by an unknown person. She is briefly seen in Dead or Alive 4 during Helena's ending.

=== Ayame ===
Voiced by (English): Kari Wahlgren (Dimensions)
Voiced by (Japanese): Hōko Kuwashima

Ayame (菖蒲) is the mother of Kasumi, Hayate and Ayane, the wife of Shiden and the aunt of Honoka. She was raped by Raidou in the past, thus giving birth to Ayane. Feeling too ashamed to raised Ayane, Ayame gave her up for adoption. Years later, Ayame revealed to Ayane about the circumstances of her birth after feeling guilty, and Ayame apologized for not raising her. Ayame was saddened when she learned that Kasumi broke shinobi code and left the village. Ayame would later ask Ayane to save Kasumi rather than be her enemy as Ayame believes that their family bonds are stronger than the shinobi code. She first appeared in Dead or Alive Ultimate, she later appeared in Dead or Alive: Dimensions, and is mentioned in Dead or Alive 6.

=== Ayane's guardian ===
Ayane's guardian is an old man who raised Ayane until she was fostered by Genra.

=== Chen ===
Voiced by: Bin Shimada

Chen (チェン) is Brad Wong's old drunken master and great teacher of Zui Quan. He sent Brad Wong on a journey to search for the legendary wine named Genra. He can be seen in Brad Wong's story mode in DOA3 and is later mentioned in DOA4 and DOA Dimensions.

=== Fame Douglas ===
Voiced by (English): Richard Epcar (Dimensions)
Voiced by (Japanese): Jōji Nakata

Fame Douglas (フェイム・ダグラス, Feimu Dagurasu) was the founder and chairman of DOATEC, and the biological father of both Helena and Kokoro. He founded DOATEC as a large and successful international weapons company. His role as leader allowed him to live in luxury, and made him famous worldwide. Fame created the Dead or Alive World Combat Championship, simple as an annual, world-wide fighting tournament for fighters to take part in to win large cash prizes. The first tournament was successful, but shortly after the event, Fame was assassinated by Bayman (who was hired by Donovan) after arguing with Donovan in DOA, where it is thought that he was opposed to the human experimentation proposed by Donovan, which led to his assassination. Donovan began to use the tournaments to lure in fighters to study them, and even as a trap to kidnap them for genetic projects. One of Fame's illegitimate daughter and heir, Helena, stands to inherit his position as chairman of DOATEC, but in DOA3 Donovan makes attempts to stop this from happening by kidnapping her and forcing her to compete in the tournament for her freedom. She escapes her imprisonment and goes on to inherit Douglas' position as chairman of DOATEC in DOA4. Fame's other illegitimate daughter, Kokoro, who participated the tournament since DOA4 was unaware of her relation with him and Helena, until she learned the truth in DOA6. He first appeared in DOA4 as a cameo in Helena's ending. He makes his first physical appearance in DOA Dimensions. He was mentioned in DOA5 and appeared as a cameo in DOA6.

=== Hitomi's father ===
Hitomi's father is a karate master and instructor who runs a successful dojo near the Black Forest in Germany. He taught his daughter everything she knows about karate has been training her since she was a child. After Hitomi rescues an amnesiac Ein after he was abandoned in the Black Forest, Hitomi's father took him as one of his students, and after training him in karate, he makes him another instructor at his karate school. When Hitomi showed interest in competing in the Dead or Alive tournament, he allowed her to participate. With his daughter ranking third place in the third tournament, he allows her to venture on her own. At sometime before DOA4, he became too ill to run the dojo, as a result, the dojo was in financial trouble. Hitomi entered the fourth tournament in order to help him in their time of need. He appears in DOA3 during Hitomi's ending and is mentioned in DOA4.

=== Irene Lew ===
Voiced by (English): Kari Wahlgren (Ninja Gaiden II), Amanda Troop (Dimensions, Ninja Gaiden 3)
Voiced by (Japanese): Yumi Tōma (anime), Mariko Suzuki (games)

Irene Lew (アイリーン・ルゥ, Airīn Ru) is Ryu Hayabusa's ally and love interest from the Ninja Gaiden series for the NES version, though only mentioned in the first DOA game in Ryu's backstory. Irene makes her first physical appearance in DOA Dimensions, acting as a support character for Ryu and the Mugen Tenshin ninjas during their mission to take down DOATEC. Irene previously appeared in Ninja Gaiden II as the character Sonia, which is revealed to be her alias. She also uses this alias as the codename for the operation of taking down DOATEC in Dimensions.

=== Lauren ===
Voiced by: Yuka Koyama

Lauren (ローレン, Rōren) is Leon's lost lover. Before the DOA tournaments, Lauren was a young thief, who met Leon in the Silk Road and fell in love with him. The two were in a loving relationship until Lauren's sudden, tragic death in the desert, shown in a flashback scene in DOA2. As Lauren died in Leon's arms, her final words were: "The man I love is the strongest man in the world." These words motivated Leon to enter the second and third DOA tournaments, by the end of which he returns to the desert oasis where he had buried Lauren, and sees the mirage of his lover who gives him a desert flower before disappearing, indicating that he has fulfilled her expectations. Prior to DOA Ultimate, her name was mistranslated as Rolande.

=== Maria ===
Maria (マリア, Maria) is Helena Douglas's mother, former mistress of Fame Douglas and a soprano opera singer. She was fatally shot and killed by Christie intended for her daughter, leaving Helena alone and seeking vengeance. DOA6 reveals that NiCO eventually reanimated her corpse, and showed it off to Helena when explaining her motives. Helena disapproved of it, citing that that one needs to move on, although it is implied from a POV shot from behind her canister that Maria was successfully revived regardless.

=== Mei Lin ===
Voiced by: Yui Horie

Mei Lin (メイ・リン, Mei Rin) is Gen Fu's granddaughter. In the first DOA game, she suffered a terrible disease, resulting in Gen Fu entering three DOA tournaments to provide funds for her operation. In the fourth DOA tournament, she is fully recovered, hence Gen Fu no longer enters the tournament. She appears in Gen Fu's ending in DOA3 and can be seen at the end of Eliot's ending in DOA4.

=== Miyako ===
Voiced by: Tomoko Fujino

Miyako (美夜子) is Kokoro's overprotective mother and a geisha residing in Kyoto. She is also the mother-figure and legal guardian of Helena Douglas, following the murder of her mother Maria at the hands of Christie. In her earlier years, Miyako fell in love with Fame Douglas, and the two of them had an affair which resulted in Kokoro's birth. Being the center of the seedy workings at DOATEC, Miyako feared for her daughter's safety. To protect her, Miyako returned to Japan and raised Kokoro as a single parent, never telling her daughter about her father or her heritage to DOATEC, and started to oversee Kokoro's training to become a geisha. However, when Kokoro became more interested in martial arts than her geisha training and decided to enter the fourth Dead or Alive tournament, Miyako reluctantly allows her to go while warning her that she will not be satisfied in finding out the truth. Her affair with Fame was revealed by Helena. In DOA5 it is revealed that she is the head of DOATEC Japan and is an operative for Donovan's new organization MIST, though Kokoro is unaware of this. Miyako's whereabout during DOA6 is unknown at the same time Kokoro found out that she and Helena are half-sisters.

=== Muramasa ===
Voiced by (English): Michael Bell (Ninja Gaiden); Paul Eiding (Ninja Gaiden 2 and 3)
Voiced by (Japanese): Takeshi Aono (Ninja Gaiden–Ninja Gaiden 2); Bin Shimada (Ninja Gaiden 3)

Muramasa (村正) is a character from the Ninja Gaiden series. He made several appearances in DOA4 as the merchant who deals with Bass, Hitomi and Leifang at the Seaside Market. He also appears in DOA5 in which he is taking care of and watching over Kasumi throughout most of the game's story.

=== Niki ===
Voiced by (English): Kari Wahlgren (DOAX2)
Voiced by (Japanese): Yuka Koyama

Niki (ニキ) is Zack's possible ex-girlfriend. They met in a casino after the Dead or Alive 3 tournament, when Zack won a large sum of money that allowed him to buy an island which he named after himself. He invited most of the girls he remembered from the last tournament to his island under the pretense of holding another tournament. The women arrived and after finding out it was a hoax, they decided to nonetheless spend their vacation there, but Zack and Niki were eventually left alone on the island. However, a previously inactive volcano erupted, and Niki decided to escape using Zack's jet pack. Zack survived, but his island was completely destroyed. During DOA4, they are seen robbing an ancient tomb and escaping in a truck filled with gold. Niki is Zack's lucky charm (Lady Luck) and he takes her everywhere with him, going as far as naming a beach on his island's eastern shore after her. Niki joined the cast of DOAX2, but not in a player-controlled role and appearing only in cut scenes with Zack as before.

=== Victor Donovan ===
Portrayed by: Eric Roberts
Voiced by (English): Grant George (Dimensions)
Voiced by (Japanese): Moriya Endo

Victor Donovan (ビクター・ドノバン, Bikutā Donoban) is the main antagonist of the Dead or Alive series. He is a ruthless, sadistic, and a manipulative mastermind scientist, the leader of DOATEC's anti-Douglas faction and is head of the Development Department, a state-of-the-art military fortress where Projects Alpha and Omega were developed. In the first DOA game, Donovan employed the Russian assassin Bayman to kill DOATEC's founder and chairman, Fame Douglas. This attempt is thought to have been successful, as Douglas died shortly after the event. The nature of Donovan's rebellion is thought to be controversy over experiments to be carried out to create the ultimate human weapon. In DOA3 Donovan captures Helena, Fame Douglas' daughter, since she stands to inherit her father's position as chairman of DOATEC. He challenges Helena to win the third Dead or Alive tournament in order to gain her freedom and learn the truth behind the company, and also employs the assassin Christie to keep an eye on her, and kill her if necessary. Meanwhile, Bayman seeks revenge after Donovan plotted his assassination to tie up any loose ends. Donovan is thought to be behind experiments such as Project Epsilon, to which Hayate was subjected; Project Alpha, the cloning of Kasumi; and Project Omega, the augmentation of Ayane's foster father Genra into the ultimate DOA fighter Omega. In Helena's ending of DOA4, Ryu is shown destroying a ship with a man who may or may not be Donovan. The same figure also appeared to have been assassinated by Christie in a gentlemen's club. In what appears to be the canon telling of Donovan's fate, DOA Dimensions shows the shadowy antagonist placing on his face the same mask that corrupted Genra. An aura of demonic energy then surrounds Donovan as he walks back into the shadows, laughing maniacally. In DOA5, which takes place two years after the fourth tournament, he sets up a new organization called MIST after DOATEC (now headed by Helena) disbanded its Military Division and Development Department, with Christie, Lisa, Miyako, NiCO and the brainwashed Rig as his operatives. At the post-end credits, he and Rig have a chat, confirming that the fourth stage of Project Alpha can begin as planned. DOA5LR (canonically DOA6) reveals that Victor recovered Raidou's corpse two years ago after the first tournament, and send it to NiCO for his revival as a cyber-nukenin demon.

In the 2006 movie adaption, Donovan was killed in the explosion of DOA Island after being paralyzed by an acupuncture dart thrown by Kasumi.

== See also ==
- Characters of Halo, source universe of SPARTAN-458 Nicole (Dead or Alive 4 guest character)
- Rio: Rainbow Gate!, source game of Rio Rollins (Dead or Alive Paradise guest character)
