= Mai Aizawa =

Japanese voice actress

- 相沢 舞
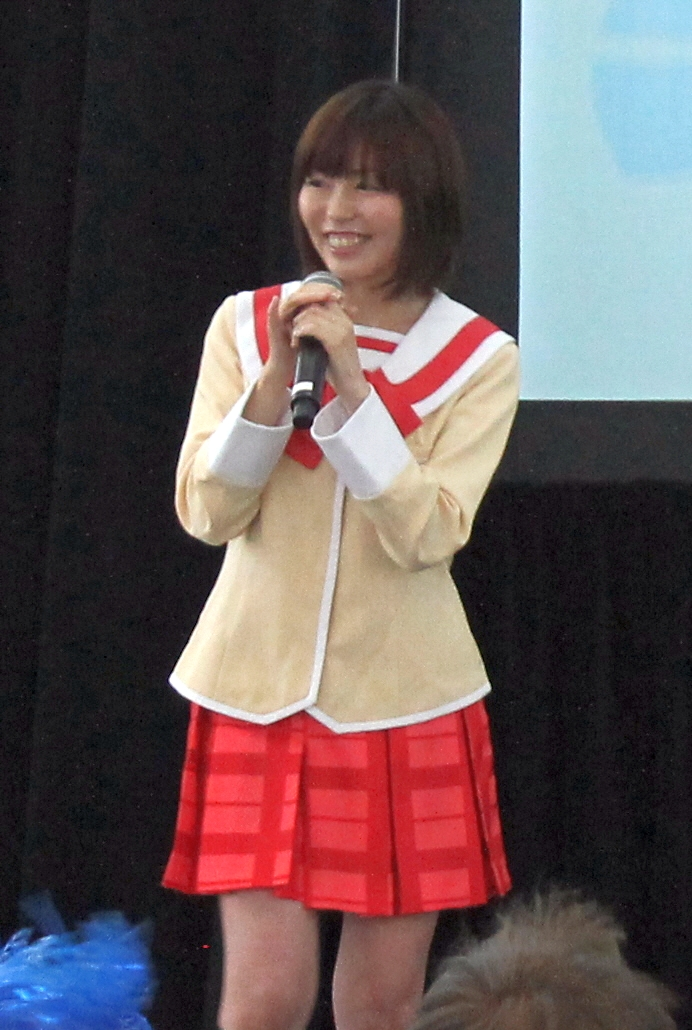
- Aizawa at FanimeCon 2012
- Born: August 21; Tokyo, Japan
- Occupations: Voice actress; singer
- Years active: 2004–present
- Agent: Aoni Production
- Notable credits: Dead or Alive series as Marie Rose; Lucky Star as Ayano; Negima as Natsumi Murakami; Nichijou as Mio Naganohara
- Height: 145 cm (4 ft 9 in)
- Musical career
- Genres: J-Pop; Anison
- Instrument: Vocals
- Years active: 2012–present
- Labels: Victor; Lantis

Mai Aizawa (相沢 舞, Aizawa Mai; born August 21) is a Japanese voice actress and singer affiliated with Aoni Production. She played Ayano in Lucky Star, Natsumi Murakami in Negima, Mio Naganohara in Nichijou and Marie Rose in Dead or Alive series. Her album, Moi, was illustrated by Ken Akamatsu. Aizawa performed theme songs for the variety show Gyōkai yōgo no kiso chishiki dan mitsu on'na gakuen.

== Filmography ==
=== Anime series ===
Year	Title	Role	Notes	Source
2003	Bobobo-bo Bo-bobo	Kopatchi		
2004–05	Morizo and Kiccoro (モリゾーとキッコロ)	Owl, Fox	TV show featuring the mascots of Expo 2005	
2005	Air	Girl	Ep. 9	
2005–11	Negima!	Natsumi Murakami	Also OVAs, Final	
2005	Negima!?	Natsumi Murakami		
2006	Ring ni Kakero 1: Nichibei Kessen Hen	Kathryn		
2007	Lucky Star	Ayano Minegishi		
2007	Dennō Coil	Kanna		
2007	Clannad	Rie Nishina		
2008	Rosario + Vampire	Student	Ep. 3	
2008	Clannad After Story	Rie Nishina		
2008	Ga-Rei: Zero	Ayame Jinguuji		
2009	Sora o Miageru Shōjo no Hitomi ni Utsuru Sekai	Yumemi Hidaka	Munto TV series	
2009	Tenjōbito to Akutobito Saigo no Tatakai	Yumemi Hidaka	Munto follow-up movie	
2009	Kofun gal no Coffy Campus life (ja:古墳GALのコフィー)	Coffy	OVA series	
2009–10	Kiddy Girl-and	Alisa		
2010	Asobi ni Iku yo!	Arisa Oshiro		
2010–11	Pokémon: Black & White	Minccino		
2010	Super Robot Wars Original Generation: The Inspector	Sawa Adzuki		
2011	Nichijou	Mio Naganohara		
2011	Fujirogu (ja:フジログ)	Mieko Noguchi		
2011	Sket Dance	Ayumi Kuramoto	ep. 10	
2011	Yuru Ani Zero(ja:汐留ケーブルテレビ)	Kyoko Hitobashira		
2011	Cross Fight B-Daman	Shumon Katsukyu		
2011	Future Diary	Minene Uryū		
2012	Dumomo to Nupepe (ja:ズモモとヌペペ)	Nupepe		
2012	Shining Hearts: Shiawase no Pan	Neris		
2012	Moe Can Change!	Anna Moegi	OVA based on the mobile game	
2013	Jewelpet Happiness	Ruruka Hanayama		
2014	Tokyo ESP	Kobushi Kuoi		
2014	Denkigai no Honya-san	Kemeko		
2025	City the Animation	Daisuke Naganohara	The character is actually an adult Mio Naganohara	
2026	Dara-san of Reiwa	Miwa Ikago		

=== Video games ===
Year	Title	Role	Notes	Source
2005	Mahou-sensei Negima! 1Jikanme (魔法先生ネギま！ 1時間目 お子ちゃま先生は魔法使い！)	Natsumi Murakami	PlayStation 2	
2005	Sotsugyou Next Graduation	Joshi A	Windows	
2005	Shirogane no Torikago	Ketexi	PlayStation 2	
2006	Rune Factory: A Fantasy Harvest Moon	Lapis		
2007	Wonderland Online: Ankoku no kinjutsu	Rachel	Windows	
2008	Lucky Star: Ryōō Gakuen Ōtōsai	Ayano Minegishi	PlayStation 2	
2008	Super Robot Wars Z	Mel Beater		
2008	Yakuza series	Izumi		
2008	Suikoden Tierkreis	Lycia		
2010	Valkyria Chronicles 2	Vicky Baytear, Marion Siegbahn	PSP	
2013	Armored Hunter Gunhound DX 機装猟兵ガンハウンドEX	Sofia Pisarro	PSP, Windows	
2013	Shining Ark	Shannon Milfy (シャノン・ミルフィ)	PSP	
2013	Dead or Alive 5 Ultimate Arcade	Marie Rose	Arcade	
2013	The Legend of Heroes: Trails of Cold Steel	Celine	PS3	
2014	CV: Casting Voice (ja:CV 〜キャスティングボイス〜)	Idzuki Yao	PS3	
2015	Kemono Friends (けものフレンズ)	Hipparion	Phone app	
2015	Bravely Second: End Layer	Edea Lee	Nintendo 3DS	
2015	Princess Rush R (プリンセスラッシュ R )	Ririetta, Phelios (リリエッタ、フェリオス)	Phone app	
2016	Dead or Alive Xtreme 3	Marie Rose	PS4, PS Vita, Switch, Windows, macOS	
2017	Warriors All-Stars	Marie Rose	PS4, PS Vita, Windows	
2019	Another Eden	Tsukiha		
2019	Dead or Alive 6	Marie Rose	PS4, XBO, Windows, Arcade	
2020	Xenoblade Chronicles: Definitive Edition	Nene	Nintendo Switch	
2021	The King of Fighters All Star	Marie Rose	Android, iOS	
2021	Super Robot Wars 30	Az Sainklaus	PS4, Nintendo Switch, Windows	

== Discography ==
=== Albums ===
List of albums, with selected chart positions
Release Date	Title	Catalogue Number (Japan)	Oricon	
Release Date	Title	Catalogue Number (Japan)	Peak position	Weeks charted
March 27, 2013	Moi	VIZL-531	162	1

=== Singles ===
List of singles, with selected chart positions
Release Date	Title	Catalogue Number (Japan)	Oricon	
Release Date	Title	Catalogue Number (Japan)	Peak position	Weeks charted
August 10, 2011	"Mio no kapu tte kapu tte moe chigire" (みおのカプってカプって萌えちぎれ, The Torn Moe – Kapu – Capsule of Mio) (Nichijou character songs 4)	LACM-4837	107	1
May 27, 2009	"ユメミタソラ" (Yumemitasora)	LACM-4614		

=== Drama CD ===
Title	Role	Notes	Source
Drama CD CLANNAD Vol.1: Nagisa Furukawa	Rie Nishina		
Lucky Star Drama CD	Ayano Minegishi		
