= Dead or Alive 5 Last Round =

2015 video game

- PlayStation 4 and Xbox One cover art featuring Kasumi and Phase 4
- Developer: Team Ninja
- Publisher: Koei Tecmo
- Directors: Yohei Shimbori; Tom Lee
- Producer: Yosuke Hayashi
- Series: Dead or Alive
- Platforms: Arcade; PlayStation 3 PlayStation 4 Windows; Xbox 360; Xbox One
- Release: February 17, 2015: PS3, PS4, Xbox 360, Xbox One; NA: February 17, 2015; JP: February 19, 2015; EU: February 20, 2015 Arcade; JP: February 19, 2015 Windows; WW: March 30, 2015
- Genre: Fighting
- Modes: Single-player, multiplayer
- Arcade system: Sega RingEdge 2

Dead or Alive 5 Last Round (Note: Japanese: DEAD OR ALIVE(デッドオアアライブ) 5 LAST ROUND(ラストラウンド), Hepburn: Deddo oa Araibu Faibu Rasutoraundo; also known as DOA5 Last Round or DOA5LR) is a 2015 fighting game developed by Team Ninja and published by Koei Tecmo. It was released for the PlayStation 3, PlayStation 4, Xbox 360, and Xbox One, with a Japan-only release for arcades and Windows version releasing the same year. It is the third and final updated version of 2012's Dead or Alive 5, following Dead or Alive 5 Plus and Dead or Alive 5 Ultimate; notable changes from Ultimate include two additional characters and a graphical upgrade for the new generation of consoles.

Unlike the original Dead or Alive 5, as a download update for PS3 and Xbox 360, the game can convert either the digital versions of 5 Ultimate or 5 Ultimate: Core Fighters into 5 Last Round. Like 5 Ultimate, a free-to-play version titled Dead or Alive 5 Last Round: Core Fighters, was released alongside the retail game on PlayStation 4, Xbox One, and Windows.

== Gameplay ==
Dead or Alive 5 Last Round features all the content from Dead or Alive 5 Ultimate, adding new costumes and customizable hairstyles, as well as two new characters and two new stages, the latter only for the PlayStation 4 and Xbox One. The PlayStation 4 and Xbox One versions received upgraded graphics, running at 1080p resolution and 60 frames per second, with the main menu and cutscenes running at 30 frames per second. These two versions also use the new game engine called Soft Engine and designed to better depict "softness" of character's bodies. Since the appearance of the Senran Kagura DLC costume pack, the PlayStation 4 and Xbox One versions have clothing breaker mechanisms for certain DLC collaboration outfits, including female characters' Valentine's Day DLC outfits when using a Critical Burst finisher on the opponent who wears some DLC collaboration outfit, similar to the Armor Breaker from other Sega AM2's Fighting Vipers.

== Characters ==
A pre-release, promotional Last Round screenshot showcasing the returning character Raidou and the series' main protagonist Kasumi

Last Round retains all 32 characters featured in Ultimate, including the four guest characters from the Virtua Fighter series (counting Ultimate's Jacky Bryant) and the three characters who first appeared in the arcade version and then as DLC (Marie Rose, Nyotengu and Phase-4), along with over 300 costumes for them. In addition, Last Round adds four new characters, including bringing back the original Dead or Alive boss, Raidou, to life and introducing a new female fighter named Honoka, for a total of up to 36.

=== New ===
- Honoka, An 18-year-old Japanese schoolgirl who uses her own style that she calls "Honoka Fu". Although she does not have any experience in combat, she uses some fighting moves from other characters and also a mysterious power.
- Mai Shiranui, A guest character from the Fatal Fury/The King of Fighters series. She was announced at the 2016 Dead or Alive Festival and arrived on September 13, 2016. After her addition in Dead or Alive 6, she stopped being available for purchase on September 11, 2019.
- Naotora Ii, A guest character from Samurai Warriors, mainly based on her appearance from Samurai Warriors 4. She was announced in December 2015 to arrive on February 25, 2016 in the arcade version, and as downloadable exclusive to the PlayStation 4 and Xbox One on March 17, 2016 and Windows on March 29, 2016.

=== Returning ===
- Raidou: An evil ninja and Ayane's biological father using techniques he has stolen from other fighters. Killed in the first Dead or Alive game, he returns as an undead cyborg. The memories of what is good left in him from his past no longer exist, leaving only his obsession to copy the fighters' fighting skills.

== History ==
=== Console versions ===
Dead or Alive 5 Last Round was announced on August 31, 2014, said to arrive during spring of 2015. On January 13, 2015, the new character Honoka was revealed in Famitsu. The game was released on 17 February 2015 in North America, following by Japan on 19 February and Europe on 20 February. It has a digital-only English release for the PlayStation 3 and Xbox 360. North America and South America PlayStation 3 release was moved to the February 24 due to the PlayStation Store issues. The "Beach Party" DLC has been available for free for four weeks after launch for North American and South American PlayStation 3 owners.

Pre-ordering the retail version at GameStop and GAME for the PlayStation 4 or Xbox One rewarded the exclusive costume pack containing the "Ninja 2015" costume set (for Ayane, Ryu Hayabusa, Hayate and Kasumi), and "Aloha" costume set (for Ayane, Hitomi, Kasumi and Mila). Pre-ordering at Amazon.com, Best Buy and ShopTo rewarded access to exclusive costumes sets "Showstopper" (for Christie, Helena, Lisa and Tina) and "Beach Party" (for Kokoro, Leifang, Momiji and Rachel). In Japan, there are two special editions for the PlayStation 3, PlayStation 4, and Xbox One: the Collector's Edition and the Strongest Package, containing various digital and physical bonuses.

A free-to-play Dead or Alive 5 Last Round: Core Fighters version (similar to Dead or Alive 5 Ultimate: Core Fighters) was released in addition to the retail version for the PlayStation 3, PlayStation 4 and Xbox One. It includes the "core" content with only four characters (Ayane, Hayate, Kasumi and Ryu Hayabusa) with the option to purchase the rest as DLC. Jann Lee, Mila, Kokoro, Hitomi, Rig and Leifang have all been free of charge for limited periods at different points in time as each other.

The Xbox One also received a free trial version titled Dead or Alive 5 Last Round: Xbox One Trial, which has the same playable characters as Core Fighters but allows only a certain amount of hours of playtime. After playing for the available play time, the game becomes unplayable unless the players would upgrade to Core Fighters for a small fee. A limited-time special campaign running between August 26 and September 14, 2015, has offered Leifang for Core Fighters free of charge and decreased prices on the add-ons for the game, also reducing the price of the trial version's upgrade on the Xbox One by half.

=== Arcade version ===
The arcade version of Last Round was brought by a free upgrade patch for the arcade version of Ultimate on February 17, 2015. It has the Last Round only contents unlocked by default.

=== PC version ===
The Windows PC version of Last Round is only the second game in the series on PC, after Dead or Alive Online's open beta, and the third game for Virtua Fighter guest characters since their last PC game appearance on the PC version of Virtua Fighter 2. Based largely on the PS3 version of the game, it lacks the two new stages that are exclusive to the PS4 and Xbox One versions, but does have the stage effects of the PS4 version. It also does not feature the improved breast physics of the Soft Engine for the characters. Originally intended to be released on February 17, 2015, it was delayed six weeks to March 30, with Steam users being given a Halloween 2013 costume pack free of charge. The online functionality support was promised to arrive within three months since the release, but the patch to enable it was postponed indefinitely by the end of June. On October 1, 2015, Patch 1.04 was released on the Steam version, enabling ranked online functionality. This patch, however, still lacks the lobby functionality that is currently only present on the console versions of the game.

The Core Fighters version was announced to be released on October 3, 2016. Those who had already owned the full game prior the Core Fighters release received a free update on unlocking all characters, music, and the story mode.

=== Post-release ===
Director Yosuke Hayashi said they plan on supporting Last Round long-term, including "adjustments to game balance and maybe even adding additional modes." Several costume packs have been released as paid downloadable content, including ninja outfits for all characters, superhero themed costumes, destructible clothing from the Senran Kagura series, and from the Deception series of video games, and those created by The World God Only Knows creator Tamiki Wakaki. Later outfits included costumes of various characters from Falcom and Square Enix games as well as from Tatsunoko productions, Shonen Magazine's Fairy Tail and Attack on Titan (including a free Attack on Titan based stage for PS4 and Xbox One), Aquaplus, Arc System Works's Guilty Gear and BlazBlue. In turn of having Senran Kagura collaboration costumes in this game and Dead or Alive Xtreme 3, the character Ayane is set to appear as a DLC guest character in Senran Kagura: Estival Versus, while Marie and Honoka, along with Ayane, who appeared as a DLC character in Estival Versus are set to appear as DLC characters in Senran Kagura: Peach Beach Splash. The costumes for the Halloween pack were selected from fan submissions for a contest. Following the release of the Halloween Costume 2015, the update spaces on adding DLC for PlayStation 3 and Xbox 360 already reached their limits due to a file size problem on these versions.

A new stage was added to the game with an update in July 2015 and a "major update" bringing another new stage and a mysterious brand new character was announced for spring 2016 (around March), later revealed to be Naotora. Mai Shiranui from SNK Playmore's fighting franchises was added to the game in September 2016. New DLC content and updates have continued to arrive until December 2017, when the full-time development of Dead or Alive 6 began.

== Reception ==
Reception

Aggregate scores
Aggregator	Score
GameRankings	(PS4) 75.19% (XONE) 72.40% (PC) 60.50%
Metacritic	(PS4) 74/100 (XONE) 69/100 (PC) 69/100
OpenCritic	36% recommend

Review scores
Publication	Score
Famitsu	34/40
Game Informer	7.25/10
GameRevolution	3.5/5
GamesTM	7/10
PlayStation Official Magazine – UK	6/10
Official Xbox Magazine (UK)	7/10
Play	71%
Hardcore Gamer	3.5/5

The game received mixed to average reviews according to the review aggregation websites GameRankings and Metacritic. OpenCritic determined that 36% of critics recommended the game. Reviewers such as Brian Shea from Game Informer, Blake Peterson from Game Revolution, Chris Dunlap from Gaming Age, Ernest Lin from PlayStation Universe, Simon Miller from X-One, and Ken McKown from ZTGD recommended this "great" and "incredibly accessible" fighting game with much content for those who did not get Ultimate or just never played a Dead or Alive game before, and to try out the free version first in case of a doubt. Hardcore Gamer's Adam Beck endorsed Dead or Alive 5 Last Round for those "looking for a fun, over-the-top fighter with a lot of charm," even as he criticized it for how "the few new additions are far from compelling and there are some unfortunate bugs at launch."

During the 19th Annual D.I.C.E. Awards, the Academy of Interactive Arts & Sciences nominated Dead or Alive 5 for "Fighting Game of the Year".

The PS4 and Xbox One versions of the game have sold more than 35,000 physical copies in Japan within the first week after its release. After the first four months, Dead or Alive 5 Last Round across all three platforms sold over 330,000 copies worldwide. By mid-2015, the accumulative sales of the standard Dead or Alive 5, 5 Ultimate and 5 Last Round combined totaled over 1.5 million copies worldwide.

After the first six months, the free-to-play versions on all platforms have been downloaded by four million users worldwide. The number of downloads crossed six million by April 2016. By January 2017, the total had reached 8 million, exceeding 9 million by July 2017 and 10 million by September 2017. It got to 11 million by June 2018, and 12 million by January 2019.
