= Dead or Alive 6 =

2019 video game

- Cover art featuring a visibly injured Kasumi
- Developer: Team Ninja
- Publisher: Koei Tecmo
- Directors: Yohei Shimbori; Tom Lee
- Producer: Yohei Shimbori
- Designer: Akihiro Nakamura
- Programmer: Taku Sugawara
- Artist: Yutaka Saito
- Writer: Yutaka Saito
- Composers: Hiromu Akaba; Yosuke Kinoshita
- Series: Dead or Alive
- Engine: Katana Engine
- Platforms: PlayStation 4; Windows; Xbox One; Arcade; Last Round: PlayStation 5; Xbox Series X/S; Windows
- Release: March 1, 2019: PS4, Windows, Xbox One; WW: March 1, 2019 Arcade; JP: July 18, 2019 Last Round; WW: June 25, 2026
- Genre: Fighting
- Modes: Single-player, multiplayer
- Arcade system: Sega ALLS

Dead or Alive 6 (Note: Japanese: DEAD OR ALIVE(デッドオアアライブ) 6, Hepburn: Deddo oa Araibu Shikkusu; abbreviated as DOA6) is a 2019 fighting game developed by Team Ninja and published by Koei Tecmo. The game is the sixth main entry in the Dead or Alive fighting series following Dead or Alive 5 (2012) and runs on a new engine, offering new features and introducing new mechanics. It was released for PlayStation 4, Windows, and Xbox One on March 1, 2019, and was later released for arcades in Japan on July 18, 2019.

Dead or Alive 6 received mixed reviews from critics, who praised its gameplay, stages, and beginner-friendly tutorials, but criticized its lackluster multiplayer functions, emphasizing the absence of online lobbies at launch. A free-to-play version of the game titled Dead or Alive 6: Core Fighters was released on March 15, 2019. An updated version called Dead or Alive 6 Last Round was released on June 25, 2026, alongside the free-to-play version titled Dead or Alive 6 Last Round: Core Fighters for PlayStation 5, Xbox Series X/S, and Windows.

By mid-2026, the cumulative sales of Dead or Alive 6 and Dead or Alive 6 Last Round combined have sold over 1 million copies worldwide, while the free-to-play versions reached over 8 million downloads.

== Gameplay ==
The game is more graphically violent compared to previous entries in the series.

New features include slow-motion moments and visible damage on the fighters during the course of the fight, while the sweat effects from Dead or Alive 5 return and are more pronounced. Dead or Alive 6 also marks the first time for the series to have costume customization mode. The game adds blood effects and new violence physics that can be user-adjusted or turned off in the options.

The game is supposed to be more accessible for newcomers. New mechanics introduced are the Fatal Rush, a beginner-friendly mechanic where pressing one button multiple times results in the character performing a simple combo, and the Break Gauge, a meter that builds up as the characters attack. If the Gauge is full, a Fatal Rush will culminate in a Break Blow, similar to what the Critical Blow in Dead or Alive 5 would do. There is a new mechanic named the Break Hold, where the character reverses an opponent, stunning them, before appearing behind them, open for a counter. The juggling ground-bounce system in this game is also being enhanced to extend juggle combos.

== Characters ==
The game launched with a base roster of 24 characters, with an additional 7 characters released as downloadable content. New to the fighter roster are Diego, a Mexican-American street fighter hailing from New York City, who enters the tournament in order to provide funding for his sick mother; NiCO, a M.I.S.T. scientist and silat martial artist from Finland, who wears a pair of EMF rings to utilize lightning-based attacks; Tamaki, a Japanese former model turned fashion designer who made her debut in Dead or Alive Xtreme Venus Vacation and fights using aikido; and guest character Kula Diamond from The King of Fighters series, a modified human who was created by an organization called NESTS.

Characters listed in bold are new to the series or playable for the first time; characters listed in italics are guest characters.

- Ayane
- Bass Armstrong
- Bayman
- Brad Wong
- Christie
- **Diego**
- Eliot
- Hayate
- Helena Douglas
- Hitomi
- Honoka
- Jann Lee
- Kasumi
- Kokoro
- La Mariposa
- Leifang
- Marie Rose
- Mila
- **NiCO**
- Raidou
- Rig
- Ryu Hayabusa
- Tina Armstrong
- Zack

The following characters are paid downloadable content added post-launch via updates. These characters are included in the Last Round re-release, with the exception of guest characters Mai and Kula, who remain purchasable DLC, and newcomer Japanese dancing school girl Minato.

- Phase-4
- Nyotengu
- Mai Shiranui
- **Kula Diamond**
- Momiji
- Rachel
- **Tamaki**
- **Minato** (Note: Exclusive to Dead or Alive 6 Last Round.)

== Plot ==
Following previous events, Kasumi, a would-be leader of the legendary Mugen Tenshin Ninja Clan, who has abandoned her clan and became a "runaway ninja", secretly lives in a hermitage in a mountain village, while the reformed DOATEC corporation is still run by Helena Douglas. Both DOATEC and the Mugen Tenshin discover that the organization, MIST, run by Victor Donovan, is after the fifth tournament qualifier participant, Honoka, due to her having a mysterious power signature, causing them to watch over her in different ways.

During preparations for the sixth Dead or Alive tournament, Helena orders her Swedish ward, Marie Rose, to guard Honoka while Zack recruits new and returning fighters. While Hayate and Helena discuss previous events, Hayate recognizes Rig from photos of the oil platform before its destruction. Wanting to find him, Helena informs Hayate on his whereabouts, being in New York city with Bass Armstrong. During the encounter, Rig doesn't know Hayate or remembers being involved in the events within MIST. Unsure if he was the same person, Hayate and Ayane decide to keep an eye on Rig. Kasumi accompanies Ryu Hayabusa to deal with MIST after the former is approached by her clone named Phase-4, and is ambushed by 3 other clones, which the two managed to fend off. Both Bass and his daughter, Tina, form their own wrestling team called the MUSCLE, with Helena announcing DOATEC as their sponsor and appointing Rig to sponsor them.

Some time ago, Donovan, accompanied by Christie, recruited the scientist NiCO to replace Lisa Hamilton in MIST's revival of life project, with plans to develop a robotic replica of Raidou, though NiCO also plans to use the project to resurrect her own father. NiCO sought out Kokoro to repay her mother, Miyako, for getting her a job with MIST. Kokoro was left depressed after her mother abruptly left without a word, with NiCO empathizing with her abandonment as she too was abandoned by her own mother, but this angers Kokoro and the two fight. Kokoro bests her, but NiCO gives her a photo of Kokoro and Helena as children with Fame Douglas, prompting Kokoro to later asked Helena what the photo meant, with Helena reluctantly revealing that the two are half-sisters who shared the same father. Shocked by the revelation, Kokoro demanded to learn of it from her mother but Helena tries to stop her. Overpowered by Kokoro, Helena tearfully begs her not to leave, as Kokoro is the only family she has left and must protect her, ultimately convincing her. Zack manages to get Kokoro to reconcile with Helena, and offering her an invite to the tournament. Helena later meets with Lisa, who survived the lab destruction, as both discuss the information gathered during Lisa's risky infiltration of MIST. Afterwards, as a concerned Lisa wonders what has happened to the Phase 4 who attacked Bayman's military patrol during the previous events, she is approached by NiCO, revealing to be her replacement, and warns her to rethink working under Donovan, but NiCO refused, appearing to be already aware who he is.

During the tournament, Ayane informs Hayate on Honoka having similar abilities to Raidou, with Hayate deciding to have her taken into custody. While Rig is in the middle of cheering in the crowd, Donovan orders NiCO and Christie to activate Rig's "Donovan Jr" persona by planting the hypnotic device on him, brainwashing Rig into serving MIST, revealing to have been unknowingly brainwashed into serving them during the previous events. At the MIST laboratory, Donovan fawns over a capsule containing a mysterious female figure while NiCO watches in disgust. Hayate, unaware of Rig's brainwashed condition, comes across Rig who then calls him Epsilon and dispatches the prototype Raidou robot to deal with him. Hayate manages to defeat the prototype but Rig slips away and activates the Epsilon brace which freezes Hayate's body. Sometime later, Jann Lee, who won the previous tournament, spots Rig, whom he lost to in a fight during their previous encounter, and thinks he can challenge him again. Jann Lee defeats Rig, who appears strangely irritable and leaves claiming to lack memory of their previous encounter, which confuses Lee. After Rig is targeted earlier by Hayate and then by Bayman, Bass becomes worried about his best friend's situation and sudden disappearance. Jann Lee along with Mexican-American newcomer, Diego, both make it to the final round of the tournament with Jann Lee emerging victorious once again. However, Diego rises, refusing to give up and defeats Jann Lee in an unofficial rematch.

Meanwhile, Lisa prepares a prototype anti-Epsilon brace to help prevent it from freezing Hayate's body. Ayane attempts to take Honoka into custody, but is forced to fend off Marie Rose. Ayane ultimately bested Marie, but the distraction allowed Christie to kidnap Honoka. At the MIST laboratory, Honoka is knocked unconscious and is used as a subject to revive Raidou, revealing the former to be the latter's biological daughter. With Honoka's energy not being enough for the revival, and knowing Ayane is also Raidou's offspring, Christie sends a signal from Honoka's cell phone to Marie, attempting to lure Ayane to the facility. Upon arriving, Ayane and Marie encounter NiCO, who Ayane held off to allow Marie to find Honoka. Although Ayane defeats NiCO in battle, the latter then reveals Ayane's relation to Honoka with the two being half-sisters, shocking Ayane. NiCO then subdued Ayane off-guard with her electric gloves, not before Ayane sends two butterflies as signals for help. While fighting Rig, Hayate receives the butterfly, prompting him to abandon the fight. Kasumi and Hayabusa would receive the other butterfly during their fight with Christie and the prototype Raidou. Afterwards, Bayman arrives at the facility, saving Marie from Christie, who held her a gunpoint. The energies of Honoka and Ayane successfully revives Raidou, who emerges as a powerful undead cyborg. As Kasumi and Hayate infiltrate the facility, they come across NiCO, attempting to dispose of Ayane and Honoka. Kasumi is forced to fight NiCO and a brainwashed Ayane while Hayate is forced to pursue a Phase 4 clone kidnapping Honoka.

As Ayane and Honoka are rescued, Honoka is left with Marie in Bayman's care while Hayate, Kasumi, and Ayane leave to track down Raidou. With their combined efforts, the three siblings kill Raidou once and for all, leaving no trace of him behind. As Helena and Hayabusa arrive at the facility, Helena questions Miyako's whereabouts to NiCO, who reveals the revival of life project and that her mother, Maria, benefited from it. Helena disapproves, stating one has to overcome their grief and move on, much to NiCO's denial and escape from Helena while they were unknowingly viewed by an unknown figure from a distance.

== Development ==
Team Ninja began full-time development on Dead or Alive 6 in December 2017 and publicly revealed it in June 2018. It was developed using a new graphics engine, which was created to power multiple Koei Tecmo titles and was previously used for Dynasty Warriors 9. Eventually, this engine would evolve to be known as Katana Engine. The studio announced they sought to tone down the sexualized portrayal of female characters and focused on being an esports title. A single-player campaign, which was described as "cohesive" by director and producer Yohei Shimbori, was developed so that the game can appeal to both casual gamers and the Western audience. A new character Diego was also designed specifically in mind for American males aged 25 to 35. Tag Battle and Team Fight modes of the previous games isn't featured due to the team focusing all its resources on one vs one modes.

Shimbori later denied that the game has been censored due to the new Sony standards against sexual content in PlayStation games and promised it would be at the DOA5 standards, claiming to having been repeatedly misunderstood or mistranslated on the issue. He also cited the unfavorable perception of the previous games by "some media outlets" as a reason for the changes and blamed the reduction of female clothing damage on otherwise being unable to distribute the game in the Western stores, stating he has been trying to avoid the repetition of the situation with Dead or Alive Xtreme 3 where they could not sell it in Europe and North America. Nevertheless, an Evo Japan 2019 official stream, featuring gravure idols Yuka Kuramochi and Saki Yoshida, was shut down and apologized for by the Evolution Championship Series president Joey Cuellar and head of business development Mark Julio citing "core values". Cuellar would later be removed from Evo in 2020 due to allegations of sexual misconduct towards young boys during the 1990s and 2000s, resulting in the cancellation of Evo 2020.

An open beta version was made available between January 12–14 for the PlayStation Plus subscribers. A new demo has been exclusive to PlayStation Plus and Xbox Live Gold members between February 22–24.

== Release ==
Dead or Alive 6 was released for PlayStation 4, Windows, and Xbox One on March 1, 2019, delayed two weeks from the original release date of February 15. Limited edition items in Japan included life-size bed sheets of Ayane and Kasumi, a bath poster of Ayane and Kasumi, and bust and buttocks shaped 3D mousepads of Honoka and Marie Rose. The characters Nyotengu and Phase-4 were launch DLC as pre-order and deluxe edition bonuses respectively. The Deluxe Edition also featured exclusive costumes for the launch roster. Similar to Dead or Alive 5, Dead or Alive 6 also has a Core Fighters free-to-play version, which was made available two weeks after release on March 15.

The first season pass added two additional characters and 62 new costumes. It received mixed reception due to being priced higher than the base game and not including all downloadable content costumes available at the time. The characters added as part of season one were guests Mai Shiranui and Kula Diamond from The King of Fighters. An arcade version announced in late 2018 was released on July 18, 2019. Returning character Momiji was teased before release and eventually was added to the game as part of season two on September 19, 2019. Rachel, also from Ninja Gaiden, returned as DLC for season three and was released on December 17, 2019. During a developer interview, characters from Dead or Alive Xtreme Venus Vacation were originally ruled out by Team Ninja from being added to the mainline fighting game series. However, during the "Dead or Alive Festival 2019" event, it was announced that Tamaki would join the roster of Dead or Alive 6. She was released on March 10, 2020 as part of season four.

In 2025, Langrisser Mobile added limited-time units Kasumi, Marie Rose, and Nyotengu as part of a collaboration event with Dead or Alive 6. The Steam version of Dead or Alive 6 was delisted on June 10, 2026.

=== Dead or Alive 6 Last Round ===
On 12 February 2026, during a State of Play presentation, producer Yosuke Hayashi announced an updated version of Dead or Alive 6 called Dead or Alive 6 Last Round for PlayStation 5, Xbox Series X, and PC. The announcement trailer showed an improved photo mode, the addition of five previously-released DLC characters to the base game, and a release date of June 25, 2026. A new Core Fighters edition was made available on release (Note: The four characters available in the base Core Fighters version are Kasumi, Hitomi, Bass, and Diego. The four characters on the Last Round equivalent are Kasumi, NiCO, Honoka, and Marie Rose.) and additional character DLCs are planned to come with later updates. Last Round is also compatible with cosmetic DLC from the base game (barring paid hair color microtransactions), but does not support cross-platform multiplayer or offer a discount or upgrade path for owners of the original release. Previous third-party guests Mai Shiranui and Kula Diamond are not included in the base game but remain available as paid downloadable content.

In a pre-release interview for Last Round, producer Yosuke Hayashi confirmed the upcoming character DLC would introduce a brand new character to the franchise. The new character, Minato, was announced at Evo 2026.

== Reception ==
Dead or Alive 6

Aggregate scores
Aggregator	Score
GameRankings	XONE: 80.00% PC: 75.00% PS4: 72.13%
Metacritic	XONE: 76/100; PC: 73/100; PS4: 72/100
OpenCritic	55% recommend

Review scores
Publication	Score
Electronic Gaming Monthly	7/10
Famitsu	35/40
Game Informer	6.75/10
GameRevolution	4/5
GameSpot	7/10
IGN	7.7/10
PCGamesN	9/10
The Guardian	4/5
The Games Machine	8.4/10

Dead or Alive 6 Last Round

Aggregate scores
Aggregator	Score
Metacritic	PS5: 69/100; XSX: 66/100; PC: 63/100
OpenCritic	35% recommend

Review scores
Publication	Score
Eurogamer	4/5
Hardcore Gamer	3/5
IGN	6/10
Push Square	4/10
Gamereactor	6/10
PlayStation LifeStyle	8/10
Siliconera	7/10
Softpedia	7/10

Dead or Alive 6 received "mixed or average" reviews from critics for the PC and PlayStation 4 versions, while the Xbox One version received "generally favorable" reviews, according to review aggregator websites GameRankings and Metacritic. Fellow review aggregator OpenCritic assessed that the game received fair approval, being recommended by 55% of critics.

IGN's Mike Epstein said: "DoA 6 proves there's plenty of depth to this fighter beneath its skimpy outfits, but its story mode is disjointed and its multiplayer features are currently bare." GameSpot's Heidi Kemps said, "despite some missteps, DoA6 is a fun, engaging fighter with great-feeling, easy-to-pick-up combat, a strong sense of visual style, and a lot of personality. If you're looking for a new fighting game to learn the ins and outs of--or perhaps a nice entry into the 3D side of fighting games--DoA6 is a fighter of choice."

In a mixed review, Game Informer said that "while the tutorial and DOA Quest mode do a decent job of getting you up to speed on what makes combat tick, the awful story mode does it no favors, and the barebones online puts a damper on what could have been a second wind for the series." EGMNow's Mollie Patterson, who reviewed the game, stated that "if its flaws can be forgiven, it's still a genuinely decent new Dead or Alive chapter that offers most of what fans have loved in the past. And, even if they are a pain to unlock, I love some of the non-paid alt costumes we've been given."

In Japan, approximately 26,442 physical units for PS4 were sold during its launch week becoming the number one selling game of any format. 350,000 units of the game were shipped worldwide during the first month across all three platforms. By May 2019, the game had been downloaded 1 million times. The number of digital versions' owners crossed 2 million by December of that year. by April 15 2020, the game was downloaded 3 million times. As of February 13, 2026, Dead or Alive 6 shipped over 900,000 units worldwide and has been downloaded over 8 million times. As of June 29, 2026, the updated version, Dead or Alive 6 Last Round, sold around 100,000 copies during its first week while the combined sales of the standard version and 6 Last Round have totaled over 1 million copies worldwide.

On release, Dead or Alive 6 Last Round received mixed reviews from critics and an overall negative reception from players. Criticism was primarily targeted at the pricing, lack of an upgrade path to existing owners of Dead or Alive 6, and minimal gameplay changes from the original. The lack of both rollback netcode and cross-platform play was also highlighted.

List of awards for Dead or Alive 6
Year	Award	Category	Result	Ref.
2019	Game Critics Awards	Best Fighting Game	Nominated	
2019	The Game Awards 2019	Best Fighting Game	Nominated	
2020	23rd Annual D.I.C.E. Awards	Fighting Game of the Year	Nominated	
2020	NAVGTR Awards	Game, Franchise Fighting	Nominated	
2020	Hardcore Gamer	Best Fighting Game	Won	
