= Marie Rose (Dead or Alive) =

Dead or Alive character

- Dead or Alive character
- Marie Rose in Dead or Alive 6 (2019)
- First game: Dead or Alive 5 Ultimate: Arcade (2013)
- Created by: Saito Yutaka
- Designed by: Natsuko "Fubuki" Kawakami
- Voiced by: EN: Christine Marie Cabanos; JA: Mai Aizawa

In-universe information
- Origin: Sweden
- Nationality: Swedish
- Fighting style: Systema

Marie Rose (Japanese: マリー・ローズ, Hepburn: Marī Rōzu) is a character in the Dead or Alive series by Koei Tecmo's Team Ninja development team, who made her debut in Dead or Alive 5 Ultimate. In English, she is voiced by Christine Marie Cabanos, while in Japanese she is voiced by Mai Aizawa. She is the servant, protege, surrogate daughter-figure and ward of Helena Douglas.

== Conception and design ==
Several designs were considered for the character to add to the arcade version of Dead or Alive 5 Ultimate, before choosing a lolita maid aesthetic.

When developing the arcade version of Dead or Alive 5 Ultimate, Koei Tecmo art director Saito Yutaka wanted to include a character that would heavily contrast the series' previous designs and stand out, especially as the arcade version would be Japan-exclusive. Development team Team Ninja was also feeling restricted by the concept of how characters were expected to look in the series, and wanted to subvert player expectations, specifically in how the series had been defined by every female character having large breasts. Additionally where previous characters had been created from a concept of their fighting style or personality first in the series, they chose several keyword traits to develop around: "Gothic Lolita," "twin-tailed," and "small chested", keywords they had observed to be particular popular with youth in Japan at the time. Aspects such as her personality and style of speech were developed from several team meetings as they examined traits suitable for the character image they wanted to convey.

The character's design was overseen by Natsuko "Fubuki" Kawakami. Even before the Gothic Lolita aspect was decided upon, she had wanted to introduce a younger character to contrast the "mature, stylish, and tall" women of the cast, citing the presence and popularity of such characters in anime. According to Kawakami, primary focuses were on the "target user group" and "what DOA doesn't have", which she felt helped the character's design come about naturally. Marie Rose stands 147 centimetres (4 ft 10 in) tall, and has measurements of 74-56-78 cm (29-22-31 in). As her physique was completely different from other characters in the game, the development team was worried she would be poorly received, so they emphasized her as being "cute" which quelled any concerns when they presented her to the public prior to the game's release. She was given blonde hair in a twin-tail hairstyle because she felt it suited the look they were going for, and combined well enough with her young appearance to differentiate her from other blonde characters in the series like Helena Douglas.

When developing Dead or Alive 6, they were aware the character had become popular with their fandom, and gave her a casual outfit designed around a "date night" motif to reflect that. The development team focused on her cuteness, feeling she wouldn't be accepted by audiences without it. As a result, they spent a significant amount of time on her facial expressions, revising them frequently through the development process. This extended to her fighting style, which is a variation of systema that focused on making sure the actions looked appropriate for a little girl, alternating between flowing and blunt attacks.

== Appearances ==
Marie Rose was introduced in the arcade version of Koei Tecmo fighting game Dead or Alive 5 Ultimate, established as an 18-year-old Swedish maid working as the servant of Helena. She returns in Dead or Alive 6, where she forms a friendship with the young girl Honoka, with the two forming a tag team during the game's tournament. She also appears in series spin-off title Dead or Alive Xtreme 3 where fans voted to include her by a wide margin, and she later returned for related title Venus Vacation. In all appearances, she is voiced by Mai Aizawa in Japanese, and in English by Christine Marie Cabanos.

Outside of Dead or Alive titles, she also appears in Koei Tecmo crossover action game Warriors All-Stars.

Her fighting style, Systema, is a Russian military martial art. Originally she was intended to use Shaolin Kung Fu, but after the development team learned about Systema they felt the fluidity of the techniques worked better with the cute movements they wanted Marie Rose to convey, dubbing the end result "Loli Systema". Team Ninja's motion director integrated a "strong sense of play" into her animations of his own accord, and the end result pleased the team more than they expected.

== Promotion and reception ==
In merchandise, several figures have been produced by companies such as Kotobukiya, Kaiyodo, Max Factory, and Freeing B-Style. A 1/6th scale diorama by Koei Tecmo was also released as part of their collaboration with mobile game Azur Lane. Meanwhile, several 3D mousepads were also released, with the wrist rests designed to emphasize either her bust or her buttocks. She and Honoka were also featured on promotional swimsuit posters given out for pre-orders of Xtreme 3.

Since her debut Marie Rose has been mostly well received, and has often been a frequent subject of cosplay by fans of the series. The Dead or Alive 6 development team stated that the game came about because of the characters popularity, as after her debut several other companies approached Koei Tecmo to collaborate with them due to the marketing buzz that spread rapidly. Matt Sainsbury of DigitallyDownloaded.net stated while he felt Marie Rose was "controversial [...] (for obvious reasons)", he considered her one of his favorite characters in gaming. Describing Marie Rose as originally "something of a joke character" for how sharply she contrasted against the series' other female characters particularly in regards to bust size, he felt while she appeared intended to be "somewhat of a joke character" she had become one of the most popular in the series. Sainsbury attributed these factors to her being "coquettish and cute", but also the development team involving her more in the game's story which helped illustrate "glimpses of a fun and empowered personality".

In contrast, the staff of Kakuchopurei criticized her design as "just loli fanservice" and felt there was not much thought put into her design, comparing her to characters such as Tekken's Lucky Chloe or Soulcalibur's Amy in that regard. They further felt she was less fleshed out and more a "checklist character" collection of tropes to fill out the roster, highlighting her short temper, short height and low attack damage. However, despite these criticisms they were hopeful the series would do more with Marie Rose in the series' main storyline. Ishaan Sahdev of Siliconera described her as having an "interesting sense of style", noting while her original outfit tied into her gothic lolita aspect, he expressed confusion over what her primary alternate attire was supposed to be, describing it as a mix of swimsuit and maid outfit and furthermore a "crime against fashion". On the other hand, Dengeki Online writer "Masked Imachi" heavily praised her battle suit attire, and considered her his current favorite character in the series. He expressed a preference for the character's stories over their gameplay, and appreciated how "cute" Marie Rose was, feeling that later additions to the series would have a hard time surpassing her character in terms of appeal.

Zenji Nishikawa of Famitsu describe her story in Venus Vacation as "sports-like" due to her drive to prove herself as a more adult figure in Helena's eyes. He pointed out that while her character wants to be regarded as mature, she tends to use childish speech and mannerisms, which he found particularly cute alongside her "little devil" aspect in how she interacts with the player. Her friendship with Honoka was considered another highlight, in that both girls portrayed a vulnerability with their friendship, particularly in their interactions with the character Nyotengu. Nishikawa mentioned that while she's portrayed as having body issues with her height and figure, he felt both were fine and expressed she should instead be proud of it as she offered a nice contrast to other female characters in the series.

Dr. Ardian Indro Yuwono in a paper for Indonesian journal Interaksi examined the designs of several female characters in Dead or Alive 6, which included Marie Rose. Describing her as having "a child's body posture design" despite the character's age, with her physical features appearing more in line with a young teenager fitting of a "loli" archetype seen in media. In-game, Yuwono pointed out this was reflected by her outfit options; while many of the characters in Dead or Alive featured clothing options that exposed their bodies, he observed Marie Rose's were more covered and "childish", even in regards to swimwear. He felt while Marie Rose was still sexually objectified in the series, her physical appearance made her unique in the game as the sexualization imposed on her character was not directly due to the physical but the "forbidden sexual fantasies" allusion of her design. He clarified that this did not make any negative implications for a viewer attracted to her however, thanks to her established adult age of 18. Meanwhile, he stated her maid element furthered the sexual fantasy aspect of the character, representing a Japanese trope commonly found in maid cafes and pornography depicting a subservient woman, as well as a particularly popular subject in cosplay.
