= Helena Douglas =

Dead or Alive video game character

- Dead or Alive character
- Helena Douglas in Dead or Alive 2
- First appearance: Dead or Alive 2 (1999)
- Created by: Tomonobu Itagaki
- Designed by: Tomonobu Itagaki; Yutaka Saito (DOA5, DOA6); Yohei Shimbori (DOA6)
- Voiced by: English: Karen Strassman (DOAX2–DOA Paradise, DOA5-present) Julianne Buescher (DOA Dimensions); Japanese: Yuka Koyama
- Portrayed by: Sarah Carter (film)

In-universe information
- Fighting style: Piguaquan
- Origin: France
- Nationality: French

Helena Douglas (エレナ・ダグラス Erena Dagurasu) is a character in the Dead or Alive series of fighting games by Team Ninja and Tecmo (Koei Tecmo). She was introduced in 1999's Dead or Alive 2 as a French opera singer and Piguaquan martial arts seeking to avenge her mother's murder. Due to her blood relation to Fame Douglas, the founder and original head of the seemingly antagonistic organization behind the Dead or Alive fighting tournaments, DOATEC, she has become a key character in the franchise, including serving as the protagonist of Dead or Alive 4.

== Conception and design ==
Helena was conceived by Tomonobu Itagaki for Dead or Alive 2 as a character to help introduce DOATEC, the company behind the series' fighting game tournaments, and its related characters, as well as serve as an introduction to the Douglas family in the game's story going forward. To help illustrate her personality, he had voice actress Yuka Koyama record several of her lines multiple times in different phrasings and inflections. While he initially wanted to include just the best take, he improvised including them all.

While a Piguaquan martial artist character with a similar appearance was considered for the first Dead or Alive, it was set aside as they gravitated away from designing characters solely around fighting styles. Itagaki revisited the concept as there was a teacher in the martial art living near him, though found the initial iterations of the character didn't feel right for him at all. As a result, he redesigned her fighting style from the ground up, taking liberties with the martial art as he felt being able to enjoy the character was more authenticity, stating in an interview with Famitsu "I didn't want to create a Piguaquan user, I wanted to create Helena."

== Appearances ==
Helena Douglas is the illegitimate daughter of Fame Douglas and his mistress, a French soprano named Maria. Seemingly distant from her father, Helena was hardly affected by his assassination after the first Dead or Alive, and instead followed in her mother's footsteps by becoming a successful opera singer in her own right. However, she herself is targeted in an attempted hit during one of her performances, but Maria spots the assassin's sniper rifle at the last second and intentionally takes the fatal bullet intended for her daughter, leaving Helena alone and seeking vengeance.

She officially debuts in Dead or Alive 2 (1999), where, while searching for the killer, she discovers that her parents' deaths and the attempt on her own life are connected to the Dead or Alive (DOA) World Combat Championship, and enters the tournament to discover the truth. Although never explained in the series, Helena appears to have learned or known information pertaining to the Dead or Alive Tournament Executive Committee (DOATEC), especially after encountering an amnesiac contestant named Ein. Helena implicates Ayane as her mother's assassin, an accusation Ayane neither confirms nor denies, which causes a fight to break out between them.

Helena returns for Dead or Alive 3 (2001), and is captured by antagonist Victor Donovan and imprisoned. Although Helena insists that she has no ties to DOATEC, Donovan declares that her freedom and the revelation of the truth behind DOATEC—her father having been the head of the organization prior to his death—hinges on her winning the third tournament. In the meantime, Donovan assigns Christie to keep an eye on her, with orders to kill her if necessary. However, when confronted by Helena, Christie admits that she is an assassin sent to terminate her, but the attempt fails.

Helena takes over as new chairperson of DOATEC in 2005's Dead or Alive 4, in which she is the main protagonist. She hires the assassin Bayman to take out Donovan, a job he declines. When the DOATEC Tritower comes under attack by the Mugen Tenshin ninja clan, Helena meets La Mariposa, who admits she tricked the clan into attacking in order to stop Donovan. She later discovers that she and Kokoro are blood-related, as her mother Miyako had been one of Fame Douglas' mistresses. Helena is later approached by Kasumi who tells her to stop the war between DOATEC and the Mugen Tenshin. Helena refuses, stating that they'll stop at nothing until DOATEC is destroyed, and she is willing do anything to stop Donovan and Alpha-152. Helena attempts to kill Kasumi with a pistol but she is saved by Hayabusa. Helena learns the truth about Christie’s involvement of Maria’s death and they meet in battle again, the result of which is unknown, save for the fact that they both survive. Helena elects to go down with DOATEC by activating the building's self-destruct mechanism. Once the self-destruct is activated, she reflects on her childhood and the deaths of both Maria and another of her father's past lovers, Anna. As Ayane, Hayate, and Ryu Hayabusa are detonating the DOATEC headquarters, Helena elects to give up her life in the flames of the wreckage before Zack arrives in a helicopter to rescue her.

In Dead or Alive 5 (2012), Helena eventually hires Zack while proclaim him to the winner of fourth tournament. With Zack's help, she becomes the leader of the newly reformed DOATEC and announces the revival of the Dead or Alive tournaments, then enlists Hayate and Ayane to help Kasumi on the latter's mission of destroying an army of evil clones of herself, though Helena was unaware that the Kasumi she saw was actually a clone, until the real Kasumi joins the fray in the final battle.

Dead or Alive 5 Ultimate introduced Helena's loyal maid servant Marie Rose, whom Helena send her to keep an eye on a young scholar fighter who was introduced in Dead or Alive 5 Last Round named Honoka in Dead or Alive 6, realizing that MIST will kidnap her upon witnessing a familiar phenomenal power within Honoka in the day when the said young fighter was disqualified in the fifth tournament’s Asian qualifier match. As Hayate met Rig shortly at the night after the fifth tournament ended in the same time Helena set self-destruct DiG where MIST been hiding, but not in another way it seems, Helena realize something tragically happened to Rig, not even Rig aware what happened after his “home” was destroyed and begin to live at Bass Armstrong’s apartment in New York. Although Lisa manage to survive the explosion at MIST’s first hideout on DiG, Helena tried to object Lisa from keeping herself take a risk to end Donovan’s terror, but realize the latter has a point on not wasting time to let a madman like Donovan get away from his crimes. When Kokoro found out her connection with their late-biological father Fame, Helena got into an argument with her half-sister over their illegitimate family, until Zack manage to calm down the situation, much to Helena’s relieve. As Marie, Bayman and the ninjas finally found MIST’s second hideout in the same time after Honoka and Ayane’s biological evil father Raidou was revived as an undead cyber nukenin, Helena confronts the young scientist who led a resurrection project behind Raidou’s revival, NiCO, who also revived Helena’s late-mother Maria off-screen. Upon realizing what NiCO’s plan is, Helena disapproves of bringing their lost parents back to life, citing that one needs to move on and vowing that NiCO will someday learn to move on from her pain as Helena has.

Helena is playable in the spinoff games Dead or Alive Xtreme Beach Volleyball (2003), Dead or Alive Xtreme 2 (2006) and Dead or Alive Paradise (2010), still pursuing Christie. She returned as one of nine player characters in the 2016 release Dead or Alive Xtreme 3 after being voted onto the roster in a Japanese fan poll.

Helena is a main character in the 2006 live-action film DOA: Dead or Alive, played by Sarah Carter. Helena's role of tournament hostess remains intact, but her backstory is ignored and she is given an upbeat personality that contrasts to her aloof in-game disposition; she appears in one scene wearing roller skates, and a line of dialogue has her commenting about wanting to visit Paris. Throughout the movie, Helena is treated as a necessary annoyance by tournament organizer Donovan (Eric Roberts), who has gained control of DOATEC after the death of Helena's father. She additionally gains a noncanonical love interest in Donovan's technical assistant, Weatherby.

== Promotion and reception ==
To promote the PSP release of Dead or Alive Paradise, gravure photos of Helena alongside those of Christie and Leifang were included as a pre-order bonus.

Helena was well received upon debut. Kim Ji-Yeon of Gamemeca observed that in the Volleyball series, Western characters were often shown in swimwear with strings and bold patterns that emphasized their cleavage, citing Helena specifically. By comparison he observed Asian characters like Leifang were given options that emphasized their cuteness, and questioned if this was due to cultural or physical differences. Meanwhile, Japanese magazine gM described her as having a sense of elegance in swimwear due to her French origin, particularly in how red portrayed her as someone more upper class than the other characters.

Hilary Goldstein of IGN called her a "great mixture of leg and fist strength", praising her fluid motions as the most graceful of the series' cast. Giving significant praise to her long legs, Goldstein additionally stated that she was the best dressed amongst the female characters due to a lack of "slut outfits". She further felt that Helena was the only one with an air of classical beauty to her, stating that while many of the characters had an "Asian school girl vibe men love [...] Helena has more class (and bossom, sure) going for her". The staff of Kakuchopurei praised her "many frilly and shape-defining French" outfits, comparing them to Alice from Alice in Wonderland, while also voicing praise for her lead role in Dead or Alive 4, particularly in regards to the game's conclusion.

While Zenji Nishikawa of Famitsu echoed the sentiment that Helena was elegant, he also enjoyed her calm nature in the games and saw her as a "cool adult woman". He further enjoyed that she was sometimes also portrayed as bold, acting in an unexpected manner that would surprise the player in titles such as Venus Vacation. Nishikawa emphasized too in that game's story she was frequently shown as a supportive figure towards the other characters, particularly enjoying her relationships with Kokoro and Marie Rose.

In a discussion with Takashi Kurokochi, orthopedic surgeon and director of the Yurakucho Cosmetic Surgery Clinic, Japanese magazine Game Hihyou asked him to comment on female characters in fighting games and what made their designs particularly beautiful in the eyes of Japanese audiences, among them Helena and fellow character Tina Armstrong. Kurokochi noted the emphasized lower jaw and cheekbones of their character designs, feeling it gave their faces a distinctive contour. He drew comparison to actress Audrey Hepburn as a prominent example of Western beauty, stating she had similar features but was not considered beautiful by Asian standards due to her small face. In contrast, Tina and Helena had more balanced facial features, something he felt helped set them apart.
