= Dead or Alive 5 =

2012 video game

- European cover art featuring (from top left) Hitomi, Ryu Hayabusa, Rig, Akira Yuki, Christie, Kasumi, Ayane and Tina Armstrong
- Developer: Team Ninja (Note: Worked in collaboration with Sega.)
- Publisher: Tecmo Koei
- Directors: Yohei Shimbori; Yutaka Saito; Ryuzi Kitaura
- Producer: Yosuke Hayashi
- Designers: Takeshi Omori; Takayuki Saga; Manabu Nagasaki
- Programmers: Yuki Satake; Takeshi Kawaguchi; Yoshinobu Suzuki
- Artists: Hirohisa Kaneko; Haruhiko Shikata; Yoshiteru Tomita
- Composers: Yojiro Yoshimatsu; Ayako Toyuda; Masako Otsuka
- Series: Dead or Alive
- Platforms: PlayStation 3, Xbox 360, PlayStation Vita
- Release: September 25, 2012: PlayStation 3, Xbox 360; NA: September 25, 2012; JP/AU: September 27, 2012; EU: September 28, 2012 PlayStation Vita; NA: March 19, 2013; JP: March 20, 2013; EU: March 22, 2013
- Genre: Fighting
- Modes: Single-player, multiplayer

Dead or Alive 5 (Note: Japanese: DEAD OR ALIVE(デッドオアアライブ) 5, Hepburn: Deddo oa Araibu Faibu; abbreviated as DOA5) is a 2012 fighting game developed by Team Ninja and published by Tecmo Koei for the PlayStation 3 and Xbox 360. It is the fifth main entry in the Dead or Alive fighting series following Dead or Alive 4 (2005) and the first to have a multi-platform release since Dead or Alive 2 (1999), as well as the series' first installment that was released for the PlayStation 3.

Dead or Alive 5 features guest characters from Sega's Virtua Fighter fighting game series (from which the series took inspiration) and several new gameplay mechanics, as well as improved graphics and a more realistic visual style than its predecessors. Its plot is set two years after the events of Dead or Alive 4, telling the interrelating stories of various characters in connection to the new DOA tournament and the continuing hunt for Kasumi's evil clone.

A portable and expanded version for PlayStation Vita named Dead or Alive 5 Plus, was released in 2013, and that same year came Ultimate for home consoles followed by arcades. A final iteration subtitled Last Round was released in 2015 for PlayStation 3 and Xbox 360 as well as for PlayStation 4, Xbox One and Windows. Dead or Alive 5 received generally favorable reviews. By mid-2015, the cumulative sales of all versions of the game combined (original base version, 5 Ultimate and 5 Last Round) have sold over 1.5 million copies worldwide, in addition to over 12 million downloads of the free-to-play versions as of 2019. The game was followed by Dead or Alive 6 in 2019.

== Gameplay ==
A fight of Hitomi vs. Ayane

Like in the other games in the series, fights in Dead or Alive 5 are based on an interruption triangle system in which strikes (normal attacks) beat throws, throws beat holds (strike interception attacks), and holds beat strikes, all of such counterattacks causing extra damage. Tag team battles from the previous DOA games have been retained. The fights take place in interactive and now more highly-destructive arenas. The game's characters are rendered in much more realistic visual style than in the previous titles in the series, including new details such as the fighters getting sweaty and their clothes getting dirty during the fights, costume-specific breast physics and semi-transparent clothing.

A new feature called Power Blow (a triggered powerful attack that can be executed when a character's health is below 50%) enables the players to knock the opponent character away in a selected direction. Characters can be thrown into the series' signature Danger Zones or over a cliff in the multi-level stages; this initiates another new feature, which is a cinematic quick time event called Cliffhanger. With Cliffhanger, if a character can grab onto the stage at the last moment before falling into a lower level, an action sequence is activated where the opponent character can make an effort to inflict even more damage if the attack succeeds. The game's Critical System features Critical Stuns (after having been hit with specific moves, opponent characters get stunned and are unable to block, but can still perform holds), Critical Combos (striking a character in a Critical Stun state can prolong the amount of time they remain stunned, but the damage that can be inflicted this way is limited) and Critical Bursts (specific strikes over the damage limit of successful Critical Combos that leave the target character completely defenseless for a short while).

The game has four main modes: Story (the main Story Mode and its bonus Missions), Fighting (offline modes, including Versus, Arcade, Time Attack and Survival), Online (Simple Match, Ranked Match and Lobby Match) and Extras. Training Mode has more features than the previous Dead or Alive games, including allowing for players to adjust the AI opponent's behavior. Online modes include an ability to organize and host tournaments for up to 16 players, Spectator Mode enabling users to chat with other players while watching fights, and Online Dojo, a training mode where one can practice with other players. Extras include Spectator, where players can watch replay of their matches, or watch fights between two AI players, and also take photographs from a position and angle of their choosing with a fully controllable camera.

Plus features optional touchscreen-based moves in the Touch Play Mode, where the fights are seen via a first-person perspective view and the players touch, flick, and pinch the screen to attack their opponents. However, Story Mode Missions, Lobby Matches and the ability to upload the recorded fights to YouTube are absent; Tag Fights are available only in the Story Mode, while Versus, Arcade and Time Attack modes are solo only. The PlayStation versions feature cross-platform play, enabling the users of both consoles to fight online matches, to share downloadable content (DLC) from the PlayStation Store with the original version, and to swap the save data between the PS3 and Vita.

== Characters ==
Dead or Alive 5 features 18 recurring characters from the series as playable fighters, each with English and Japanese voice actors:, as well as the unlockable boss character Alpha-152. Dead or Alive 5 adds three new characters to the series, Mila, Mr. Strong and Rig. In addition, the game features three additional unlockable guest characters from the Virtua Fighter series (they also make cameo appearances in the game's Story Mode), mainly based on their appearances from the Virtua Fighter 5 series. Unlike the other characters, Akira and Pai only speak in Japanese, while Sarah only speaks in English.

=== New ===
- Akira Yuki ^{a} ^{b} ^{c}, a Japanese bajiquan martial artist and the mascot of Sega's Virtua Fighter series.
- Mila, an ambitious Spanish mixed martial arts champion who works as a part-time waitress at a diner in New York City.
- Mr. Strong, a new character in theory, but in reality, it is Bass Armstrong. The name Mr. Strong is an alias of Bass because he wants to go unnoticed to the fifth tournament. He is like Lisa Hamilton, an alternative costume character of the actual character.
- Pai Chan ^{a} ^{b} ^{c}, a Chinese martial arts movie star and mizongyi practitioner from Sega's Virtua Fighter series.
- Rig, a Canadian taekwondo martial artist who is a boss at the same oil platform where Bass works and the two are rough friends.
- Sarah Bryant ^{a} ^{b} ^{c}, an American college student and mixed martial artist from Sega's Virtua Fighter series.

=== Returning ===
- Alpha-152 ^{b} ^{c} ^{d}
- Ayane
- Bass Armstrong
- Bayman
- Brad Wong
- Christie
- Eliot
- Gen Fu ^{b} ^{c}
- Hayate
- Helena Douglas
- Hitomi
- Jann Lee
- Kasumi
- Kokoro
- La Mariposa
- Leifang
- Ryu Hayabusa
- Tina Armstrong
- Zack

^a Guest character
^b Unlockable character
^c Unplayable in Story Mode
^d Boss character

=== Story ===
Dead or Alive 5 is set two years after the events of Dead or Alive 4 and the destruction of the DOATEC corporation's Tri-Tower headquarters. Helena Douglas has undertaken the task of rebuilding DOATEC but wants to use its technology for peaceful ends. Helena Douglas dissolved DOATEC's Biotechnology Division, stopped the Military Division's biological weapons projects Alpha, Epsilon and Omega, fired all members of Victor Donovan's faction, and announced that she intends to hold the fifth Dead or Alive Tournament (DOA5), hosted by Zack, "to show the world the principles and philosophies upholding the new DOATEC."

The game's Story Mode is told in the form of one long sequence, similar to the Chronicle Mode of Dead or Alive: Dimensions and presented in "hyperlink cinema style" for more character and stage interactions. It is not told in chronological order and is instead divided into a series of interconnected chapters following various characters and showing the events from their respective perspectives. There are two main storylines, one telling the story of the fifth tournament, and the other one centered around the hunt for Alpha-152. Characters from the two storylines often interact with each other in minor ways.

== Plot ==
Two years after the previous events, Bayman's military patrol is ambushed and cut down by a hooded figure of superhuman speed which then dissolves into thin air. Seeking revenge, Bayman meets Helena Douglas aboard her cruise ship, Freedom Survivor, as he is suspecting DOATEC's involvement, which Helena denies, suggesting it might be rather the work of Victor Donovan's breakaway faction. She is also approached by Kasumi, who is looking for information regarding Alpha-152 after the latter's sudden disappearance during the TriTower's destruction. Helena promises her help and arranges a meeting between Hayate and Kasumi, who insists that the pursuit of Alpha is only her fight, rejecting Hayate's offer to aid her. Kasumi then sets out to find more clues about Alpha's whereabouts, going round-the-world while being herself pursued by Ayane. She is also hunted by Bayman, who suspects Kasumi of being the attacker and desires to take her down himself. Helena informs Hayate that she will stop Project Alpha.

Meanwhile, at DOATEC's oil platform, one of the platform's worker named Rig, is paid a visit by Christie, who claims to be a woman from his past coming to "test" him, and who is still working for Donovan. Soon, the platform mysteriously comes under helicopter attack, but Rig along with Bass Armstrong, who's also employed there, succeed in putting down the fire. Donovan, his face hidden behind a porcelain mask, is seen plotting the final stage of his Project Alpha: Phase Four. Donovan orders Lisa Hamilton, who is still working with him on her research, to bring head of DOATEC Japan, Miyako, who too is part of their new organization, "MIST", to a secret laboratory located under the rig.

Various characters are shown entering the fifth Dead or Alive tournament, which also takes place at the platform. Each does it usually for their own reasons, often to either see once more or to defeat some other character. They join after being approached by Zack, who is shown finding, fighting and recruiting them around the world. After Tina Armstrong decides to return to fighting, her father Bass enters it as well, adopting a ring name of Mr. Strong; eventually, they reunite as a team. While stalking Jann Lee, Leifang eventually confronts him before the tournament on a train and there is sexual tension between them when the train is thrown off its track and crashes. Hitomi, who still hopes to see Ein (Hayate), advances to the quarterfinals, defeating Spanish newcomer, Mila, and then Eliot. During a break, Hitomi meets Hayate, who wishes her good luck. Jann Lee, who had won constructive matches against Leifang and Mr. Strong, defeats Hitomi, emerging as the winner of the tournament, but not attending the championship award ceremony out of a personal grudge for Rig, whom he lost to in an earlier fight.

In Japan, Ryu Hayabusa is approached by Hayate and joins him and Ayane. Aboard Freedom Survivor, it is revealed to the Mugen Tenshin ninjas that Helena ultimately destroyed the Tri-Tower to get revenge on Donovan for both the death of her parents during power struggles within the organization and for turning DOATEC into a corrupted, immoral and in-human organization. Helena informs them that the Phase Four will see a mass production of Kasumi clones to sell them to top militaries in the world. Feeling that something is wrong with Kasumi, Hayate orders Ayane to follow her and discover her real intentions. Frustrated with her failure to track down Alpha, Kasumi returns to Helena, demanding to be told the truth, and Helena directs her to the platform. There, Hayate wins the right to follow her from Bayman. Kasumi discovers the lab, with Alpha-152 in it, and appears to destroy her clone. However, she is then attacked and mortally wounded by Hayate and Ayane, and dies in Ryu's arms. This Kasumi is revealed to be merely a clone herself, but Ryu regrets her death anyway. Ryu destroys attacking helicopters (of the kind that attacked the rig earlier), while Hayate is captured in the lab by Rig, who turns out to be working with Donovan. Ryu sends a falcon with a message for the real Kasumi, who has been sheltering with Muramasa all that time; she immediately joins them up at the platform. In the lab, they defeat Rig, who escapes after saying it was a plan to lure them there. Lisa, dismayed to find out that Project Epsilon has been reactivated, frees Hayate. Alpha-152 then appears, taking forms of not only Kasumi but also of Hayate and Ryu, but Hayate, Ayane, Ryu and ultimately Kasumi, succeed in destroying her along with the lab.

In the epilogue, Kasumi peacefully parts her ways with Hayate and Ayane, as Ryu and Helena watch by, and promises to herself to bring down Donovan for good. In the post-end credits, a conversation between Rig and Donovan (the former revealed to be Donovan's son) is heard. With Rig's success in gathering samples from the fighters, Project Alpha can now move on to Phase Four.

== Development ==
=== Rumours and announcement ===
By January 2010, rumors about the next Dead or Alive game being developed for the PlayStation 3 had already circulated. GameSpot has listed the game as being exhibited by Koei Tecmo at their booth during the E3 2010.

We're revamping and redefining the fighting game; not just DoA5, but also the whole genre. We're calling it 'fighting entertainment.' It follows our style, but puts everything on a much grander scale...both the way the stages behave and how the characters are more fleshed out.

— Dead or Alive 5 producer Yosuke Hayashi

Dead or Alive 5 was officially announced in September 2011 at the Tokyo Game Show on September 14, 2011, for a 2012 release. The first trailer was released in December 2011. Producer Yosuke Hayashi said that the teaser image revealed at the event represents the sensuality that the game is now seeking to portray in a more sophisticated tone. At the time, the game was said to be only "15% complete". Hayashi said that his team was committed to making the environment more involved in the fighting experience than ever before and that they took "a lot of inspiration" from Naughty Dog's action-adventure game series Uncharted for a creation of the more interactive and destructible stages and the dramatic cliffhanger events.

=== Production ===
The game engine of DOA5 was built from scratch. To better balance the fighting system, Team Ninja decided to re-examine each of the characters, creating new moves from scratch when needed and carefully refining others. According to Hayashi, the entire project's main concept was a decision to change direction and to focus on the characters' presence instead of on their beauty as in the previous games. They aimed to retain the characters' personalities and characteristics but to make them more lifelike and appealing for the players. In October 2011, the series' official Facebook page announced a contest inviting fans to create and submit their own fighting moves, some of which would be used in DOA5 and their creators would have their names displayed in the game's credits. Regarding an introduction of playable guest characters from the Virtua Fighter series, the characters' key animations were provided by Sega and Team Ninja created some more while working to implement them into the Dead or Alive gameplay system, which uses similar controls but features a different kind of matches. Hayashi said Team Ninja stayed in "very close" communication with Sega AM2: "We got their guidance and feedback, we got them to check for everything we were doing with the characters." Hasayshi also said that he aimed to develop a crossover game in a manner similar to Street Fighter X Tekken, and that he chose Virtua Fighter because it was "the father of 3D gaming", and also the first 3D game that he played and the IP he personally respects most.

One of the things that I learned was the power of having a series behind you, and what it means to be part of a series. There are existing fans out there, and you have to think about the people who have supported the series for so long, and you want to make sure that the game that you make appeals to them first, and satisfies those fans first.

— Dead or Alive 5 director Yohei Shimbori

Early on, Hayashi said they attempted to move on from relying just on sex and violence: "We’re trying to focus on the real women that surround us; the voice of a female, the mannerisms. We are being realistic about it. We want to show something that’s more high class, that adult males of our generation could look at a woman [character] and be impressed with her as a woman, not just as a pin-up," as opposed to the previous concept of just "make her breasts big and just make them jiggle." Dead or Alive 5's overseas producer Peter Garza said the game's revised aesthetic direction: "Dead or Alive is known for its sexiness and high-kicking characters and certain aspects of the physics engine... Those are definitely going to be in Dead or Alive 5 - it's part of the series, it's part of its history and it's part of why people like it. But we're trying to take a bit more of a mature take on it." After the release, the game's director Yohei Shimbori said they were originally "getting feedback from the overseas offices to tone down the sexuality -- to tone down the sexiness of the game, and of the characters." However, the team then changed their decision due to negative feedback from fans, who were playing the alpha demo version who demanded bigger breasts. Shimbori said: "That was kind of surprising. There's definitely still room for having sexualized aspects," adding that he "really tries" to take fan feedback into account and to keep an open mind. Hayashi himself made a 180 turn from his previous position. Asked "what would you say to those people who think that the bikini-clad babes in DOA5 are sexist," he said their goal was to create "the cutest chicks in video games" and so they made a lot of effort to develop an advanced breast physics model that works differently with various types of clothing. Their product received the ESRB rating of Mature 17+ (Partial Nudity, Sexual Themes, Violence).

=== Promotion ===
In February 2012, Team Ninja hosted a series of press events in various locations across the world, showcasing the alpha demo of the game. Further screenshots have confirmed Hitomi and Ayane to be playable, while Kasumi was featured in a promotional poster. A trailer unveiled at the Game Developers Conference in March 2012 revealed that the game would include Virtua Fighter's Akira Yuki. In May 2012, Koei Tecmo attended London MCM Expo, showcasing a playable demo version of the game. Dead or Alive 5 tournament was also held on the GameSpot stage. In June, KT attended the E3 2012, where the live-streamed IGN Pro League Dead or Alive 5 championship was held with a new beta demo version of the game. A trailer for the event revealed another Virtua Fighter guest character, Sarah Bryant. June saw the emergence of a new trailer confirming the addition of a brand new character to the series, Rig. In July, KT's official YouTube channel MyKOEITV released a trailer showcasing tag team gameplay and showing a female fighter wearing a luchadora mask, later revealed to be La Mariposa. The "Official Declaration" trailer released in August confirmed the return of Alpha-152. In September, two weeks before the game's release, KT announced another brand new character to join the roster, a female vale tudo and kickboxing artist named Mila, while Virtua Fighter's Pai Chan was also revealed to make an appearance. The game's launch trailer was released on September 19.

== Release ==
Dead or Alive 5 was first released in North America on September 25, 2012, followed by other parts of the world within a week. A day 1 patch addressed numerous issues with the game, including balance tweaks to most characters and some minor improvements to the online mode.

On December 1, it was announced that an "expanding patch" is planned to be released for the PlayStation 3 and Xbox 360 versions in early 2013 and also that IPL is going to hold the official Dead or Alive 5 competition in 2013. Team Ninja said the patch will aim to carefully rebalance the game: "Rather than kill personality to make everyone the same, we’ll strengthen the weak characters to make a fair fight." The team also invited customers to send constructive criticism and suggestions about balancing to them via Twitter.

=== Dead or Alive 5 Plus ===
Dead or Alive 5 Plus was revealed on December 1, 2012. The demo version of DOA5+ was made available on March 19, 2013, the day of the game's release in North America.

The Collector's Edition of Dead or Alive 5 Plus in Japan includes download codes for 12 bonus "sexy costumes", a Vita cover, Dead or Alive 5 Soundtrack Volume 2, and a code to download the "extreme private gravure movie". The Dead or Alive 5 Cross Play Pack includes copies of the game for both the Vita and PS3, along with "sexy costumes for Kasumi, Ayane and Tina, cheerleader costumes for Kasumi, Ayane and Tina, codes for the "Premium Sexy Costume" and "Paradise Sexy Costume" packs, and a code for the "extreme private gravure movie". The "costume & video set" was also made available as a paid downloadable content in limited time offer during April–May 2013.

=== Marketing and merchandise ===
A game demo of Dead or Alive 5 was released with Ninja Gaiden 3 in March 2012, featuring four playable characters. The Xbox 360 version of the demo allows the use of Hayabusa and Hitomi, while the PlayStation 3 version makes Hayate and Ayane playable. The collector's edition of Ninja Gaiden 3 makes all four characters playable.

Tecmo Koei collaborated with several retail outlets on pre-order bonuses available through several store chains throughout the world. Bonuses included in-game bunny-style swimsuits for Kasumi, Leifang and Hitomi from GameStop, the in-game "DOA Devils" black swimsuits for Christie, Tina and Ayane from Amazon, and a Kasumi-themed iPhone 4 case from ShopTo. The Dead or Alive 5 Collectors Edition, available from various retailers in North America and Europe, includes a metal case, a hardcover art book, a soundtrack CD, a poster of the game's characters and a "Premium Sexy Costume" for each of 12 female characters that gives one swimsuit per character.

Stand-alone merchandise for the game include official guides by Koei Tecmo and Prima Games, an arcade stick by Hori decorated with a graphic of Ayane and Kasumi (bundled with limited versions for both the PlayStation 3 and the Xbox 360), and a clothing line by Tecmo Koei and Insert Coin (including a hoodie based on one of Hitomi's costumes in the game). Other, later released merchandise included 3D mousepads featuring Ayane, Hitomi or Kasumi, and dakimakura pillow cases featuring Ayane, Kasumi, Hitomi, Kokoro or Leifang.

=== Downloadable content ===
The first downloadable content, Costume Packs Round 1, was released on October 2, providing new outfits for several of the characters and available for free. The first purchasable DLC, Costume Packs Round 2 (featuring costume sets "Kitty Pack", "What a Character" and "Special Set"), was released two weeks later, available either sold separately or through "Full Set" containing all three at a reduced price. It was followed by Costume Packs Round 3 (with costume sets "Gym Class", "Uniform" and "Special Set 2"), released at the end of October, and Costume Packs Round 4 (with costume sets "Angels", "Devils" and "DOATEC Divas", some of them previously made available as preorder bonuses for the disc version) and Player's Swimwear Pack (also with three sub-packs and previously included in the Collector's Edition), released in mid-November, all of them also with a price discount for choosing a "Full Set" version. Two more costume packs were announced to follow up later in 2012 (in late November and December). More downloadable content, including "Hotties Swimwear" and "Zack Island stage" was released in February 2013, along with a major patch for the game.

== Reception ==
=== Pre-release ===
Prior to release, professional gamer Kayane declared Dead or Alive 5 the most beautiful fighting game she had ever seen. In a positive preview, Electronic Gaming Monthly stated, "the resurgence and appreciation for [fighting games] has only happened recently with reboots or re-imaginings of cherished titles, and DOA5 is one of these reboots. More accurately, DOA5 is a rebirth." X360 ranked Dead or Alive 5 as the third most sexy game coming over in 2012.

=== Reviews ===
Reception

Aggregate scores
Aggregator	Score
GameRankings	(X360) 79.45% (PS3) 74.57% (Vita) 84.50%
Metacritic	(X360) 76/100 (PS3) 74/100 (Vita) 80/100

Review scores
Publication	Score
1Up.com	C+
Computer and Video Games	8.1/10
Destructoid	8.5/10
Edge	6/10
Electronic Gaming Monthly	9/10 (Sweden); 7.5/10 (UK)
Eurogamer	7/10
Famitsu	36/40
G4	3.5/5
Game Informer	6/10
GameSpot	7.5/10
GamesRadar+	4/5 stars
GamesTM	7/10
GameTrailers	7.9/10
IGN	8.8/10
Joystiq	4/5 stars
Official Xbox Magazine (US)	8/10

Awards
Publication	Award
Destructoid	Gamescom: Best of Fighters
Igromania	Fighting Game of the Year

The full version of Dead or Alive 5 was met with a generally positive critical response. Reviewers typically praised the game's graphics and animation, as well as the spectacularity of the fights and their deeper gameplay mechanics. However, several reviews criticized the story mode and aspects of its online features. Some of the reviewers also expressed disappointment with what they thought was Team Ninja's failure to innovate enough as compared to previous titles in the series and the other new games in the genre.

Famitsu was the first publication to review the game, giving it a score of 36/40 (rated 9/10 by all four reviewers). IGN's Vincent Ingenito described Dead or Alive 5 as a "formidable, enormously entertaining fighter" and the deepest game in the Dead or Alive series, praising the new gameplay mechanics, "gorgeous" and "stunning" visuals, "memorable and lovingly crafted" interactive stages, "insanely deep" practice mode as well as online features, and calling it "without any question, the best entry in the series." According to GamesRadar's Giancarlo Saldana, Dead or Alive 5 features "better than ever" graphics and its improved fighting system "is another step in the right direction," and while "the game’s story mode leaves much to be desired," Dead or Alive 5's "new fighting mechanics and flashy stage effects turn battles into an entertaining, over-the-top experience." Joystiq's Ludwig Kietzmann called Dead or Alive 5 a "success as an energetic revitalization of the series." Kotaku's Mike Fahey wrote that "while Dead or Alive 5 is far from a complete overhaul of the series, it charges into the fighting game scene with all the spirit of a completely new game." Ernest Lin of PlayStation Universe stated that the "stages are the most awe-inducing spectacles ever seen in a fighting game" and "despite its shortcomings, DOA5 is the best Dead or Alive period."

GameSpot's Maxwell McGee applauded Dead or Alive 5 for its gameplay system, "impressive" graphics and "outstanding reality" in regards to characters and environments, and did not mind the plot — stating it to be "entertaining in its ridiculousness" — but criticized the game's practice mode and some online features, overall calling it "a dynamic fighter that can be enjoyed by players of all skill types." Andy Hartup of Computer and Video Games called the training modes "absolutely superb", but criticized the game for its "bizarre" story mode and because it "[lacked] the complexity of Street Fighter," summarizing that although DOA5 "isn't perfect", it is "cracking fun, a fighter that's great to watch and feels even better to play." Destructoid's Ian Bonds called it "a delicious surprise" that is "fun without being frustrating, the all-around fighter for everyone. Even the ones who won't admit to enjoying the T&A."

However, Dan Ryckert of Game Informer was much more critical of the elements like the game's story and online play system, and especially the series' perceived lack of substantial progress in some areas such as character customization, stating that this "decent fighter" is years behind the competition and Team Ninja is "showing its age." Edge described it as "mostly business as usual" with "tweaks to the formula and aesthetic, but nothing too sacrilegious or enticing." G4TV's Sophie Prell called it merely a "refinement and re-balancing of Dead or Alive 4," adding that the game is "the most welcoming to newcomers" while "hardcore fans" of fighting games might need to keep their "expectations in check". According to Matt Edwards of Eurogamer, "DOA5 doesn't tarnish the series' solid and sassy reputation — far from it — but it falls short of an evolutionary leap in terms of combat mechanics and a substantial expansion in terms of single-player." Neidel Crisan of 1Up.com stated: "DOA5 may be "fighting entertainment," but those of us who are less concerned about being entertained and instead find value in solid gameplay that rewards proper understanding of more traditional mindgames over hail-Mary guesses will want to look elsewhere."

Like previous installments of the Dead or Alive franchise, the game was criticized for objectifying women's bodies. A review in Metro pointed to the series as mostly known for its focus on the breasts of the female characters, alleging that "the majority of its characters are all impossibly well-endowed women, whose breasts wobble about their chest like a pair of blancmanges [...] portrayed as simpering, personality-free automatons." An attempt during development of Dead or Alive 5 to "tone down the sexuality" due to outside criticism was reversed due to criticism from long-term fans and testers. In response to criticism of sexualization of female characters, creative director of the games development team pointed to the fact that the game's "actions, aesthetics and overall visual presentation is more than obviously set in a light-hearted, over-the-top, candy coated universe" and stated that "we also don't feel that we are demeaning women."

In comparison, Dead or Alive Plus for the PlayStation Vita received universally strong reviews for its high-quality graphics and control system, as well as its extra features. Several reviewers regarded it as a much better conversion than Team Ninja's own earlier Ninja Gaiden Sigma 2 Plus (released for the Vita in February 2013), in particular for DOA5+'s consistent frame rate of 60 frames per second (as opposed to only 30 fps in NGS2+). However, some noted that they would recommend the purchase only for those who do not own another version of Dead or Alive 5 already.

IGN's Vince Ingenito wrote that "much like Ultimate Marvel vs. Capcom 3, this is a textbook example of a fighting game port done properly," adding that "for a version that fits neatly inside your pocket, you can't ask for much more than that." Destructoid's Ian Bonds compared it favorably to the Vita port Mortal Kombat, writing that "one of last year's best fighting games on home consoles has become one of this year's best handheld fighters." Steve Hannley of Hardcore Gamer wrote that the Vita version not only "remains the great fighting game it was on consoles and is enhanced here with multiple new and exciting additions" but being "the handheld rendition of a graphically-intense six month old game makes that fact alone worth the price of admission." According to Game Revolution, "Dead or Alive 5 Plus succeeds with arresting visuals, expansive console-quality modes, unique touchscreen gameplay, and the reliable replayability of a fighter, all in your pocket." Ryan King of NowGamer called it, "the perfect game for Vita with a control scheme that works, lovely visuals and a rock solid port behind it," being not only "one of the best-looking games on Vita" but also "definitely one of the most fun."

=== Sales and awards ===
In May, Tecmo Koei announced that it aims to sell one million copies of the game. First week sales in Japan were strong where the game sold more than 80,000 copies, mostly for the PS3. On October 29, 2012, it was reported that the game sold 580,000 units worldwide overall during the first month after its release. According to Tecmo Koei, downloadable content sales and retail pre-orders have also been favorable. Joystiq commented that the figure "compares reasonably to the 700,000 copies Dead or Alive 4 shipped worldwide in its first two months". Its main rival game, Tekken Tag Tournament 2, also released in September, has sold 840,000 units by November 2, 2012. The updated version, Dead or Alive 5 Ultimate, sold 140,000 copies worldwide in 2013, and the final version, Dead or Alive 5 Last Round sold 330,000 copies worldwide in 2015. As of mid-2015, the combined total of all 3 versions, the base version, 5 Ultimate and 5 Last Round, reached 1.5 million copies worldwide.

Dead or Alive 5 was given the title of "Best of Fighters" of Gamescom 2012 by Destructoid and was nominated for "People's Choice Award" by IGN. At E3 2012, it was nominated for the "Best Fighting Game" by Game Critics Awards (losing to Injustice: Gods Among Us) and G4TV. It was also nominated at the 2012 Spike Video Game Awards in the category "Best Fighting Game" of the year (losing to Persona 4 Arena), and for Destructoid's title of best fighting game of 2012 (losing also to Persona 4 Arena) as well as for GameSpot's "Fighting Game of the Year" (losing to Tekken Tag Tournament 2). Dead or Alive 5 has been nominated for "Best Console" game in the IGN Australia's Black Beta Select Awards 2012 and Digital Spy chose it as one of the 20 nominees for an overall "Game of the Year" of 2012. Russian magazine Igromania gave it the title of fighting game of the year. Polish web portal Interia.pl included the game's Ayane, Christie and Kasumi among the "sexiest game heroines" of 2012.

== Legacy ==
=== Dead or Alive 5 Plus ===
Dead or Alive 5 Plus is an enhanced port of DOA5 for the PlayStation Vita released in March 2013. The game adds more options for Training mode and a Touch Play mode. It was better received than the original DOA5, holding the averaged review scores of 83.40% at GameRankings and 80/100 at Metacritic.

=== Dead or Alive 5 Ultimate ===
Dead or Alive 5 Ultimate is an updated version of DOA5 released in September 2013 for the PlayStation 3 and Xbox 360, available at retail and digitally. Ultimate includes new modes and some features from Dead or Alive 5 Plus, as well as several new stages and fighters (including Ninja Gaiden's Rachel and Momiji, and Virtua Fighter's Jacky Bryant, as well as the return of Dead or Alive 2 characters Leon and Hayate's amnesiac karateka identity, Ein), and all-new features such as two-on-two online multiplayer tag team battles, among many other changes. Three new female characters: Marie Rose, Phase-4 and Nyotengu, joined the game's roster in 2014.

A free digital version, titled Dead or Alive 5 Ultimate: Core Fighters, which features four playable characters and the online mode, with additional characters and story mode content available as purchasable downloadable content, was released for the PlayStation 3 via the PlayStation Store alongside the retail version. An arcade version titled Dead or Alive 5 Ultimate: Arcade was developed in a co-operation with Sega (Ringedge 2 Hardware) for a release only in Japan later in 2013, which is also including the three new characters who was introduced in this version as DLC for console version.

=== Dead or Alive 5 Last Round ===
Dead or Alive 5 Last Round for the PlayStation 3, PlayStation 4, Xbox 360, Xbox One and Microsoft Windows (through Steam) was released in February 2015 for the consoles, and the next month on Steam. It has a digital-only release for the PlayStation 3 and Xbox 360 and a physical release for the PlayStation 4 and Xbox One, including a free-to-play version for the latter consoles. Among other changes, the original Dead or Alive boss Raidou returns as a cyborg, along with a new female character named Honoka. Including this version, the game had 12 million downloads.
