= Dead or Alive 5 Ultimate =

2013 video game

- Japanese cover art
- Developer: Team Ninja
- Publisher: Tecmo Koei
- Directors: Yohei Shimbori; Tom Lee
- Producers: Yosuke Hayashi; Hiromasa Inoue
- Designers: Takeshi Omori; Takayuki Saga
- Programmer: Yuki Satake
- Artist: Yutaka Saito
- Series: Dead or Alive
- Platforms: PlayStation 3, Xbox 360, Arcade
- Release: September 3, 2013: PlayStation 3, Xbox 360; NA: September 3, 2013; JP: September 5, 2013; EU: September 6, 2013; AU: September 26, 2013 Arcade; JP: December 24, 2013
- Genre: Fighting
- Modes: Single-player, multiplayer
- Arcade system: Sega RingEdge 2

Dead or Alive 5 Ultimate (Note: Japanese: DEAD OR ALIVE(デッドオアアライブ) 5 ULTIMATE(アルティメット), Hepburn: Deddo oa Araibu Faibu Arutimetto; also known as DOA5 Ultimate or DOA5U) is a 2013 fighting game developed by Team Ninja and published by Tecmo Koei for the PlayStation 3 and Xbox 360. It was followed by an arcade edition later in 2013. It is the first arcade game to be officially released by Koei Tecmo since Dead or Alive 2 Millennium in 2000.

DOA5 Ultimate is an expanded edition of 2012's Dead or Alive 5, incorporating some features from the PlayStation Vita's Dead or Alive 5 Plus as well as additional content, including five characters that are new or returning to the series (including two Ninja Gaiden characters), a comprehensive story mode, as well as gameplay system tweaks and expansions, many of them in the online multiplayer tag team mode (including an introduction of two-on-two tag team battles). The game received generally favorable reviews.

A free-to-play cut version of DOA5 Ultimate, titled Dead or Alive 5 Ultimate: Core Fighters, was released on the PlayStation Store alongside the retail game. The arcade edition Dead or Alive 5 Ultimate: Arcade was released on 24 December 2013, distributed by Sega. 5 Ultimate was followed by Dead or Alive 5 Last Round in 2015.

== Gameplay ==
A screenshot of Mr. Strong using the Power Launcher against Tina

Besides having fixed all known bugs, Dead or Alive 5 Ultimate adds new training modes from Dead or Alive 5 Plus: Tutorial (a training mode designed to practice key moves and strategies and consisting of the lesson part and the mission part) and Combo Challenge (a special training mode designed to learn and practice combos), as well as Team Fight mode where the players choose up to seven characters. A new gameplay feature, called the Power Launcher and working similar to the Power Blow of DOA5 (that can be used only once per round when the player's character's health falls below 50%), launches opponents high into the air, allowing more advanced players to follow up with a combo. Returning characters also gain new combos.

Some major changes were made to the Tag mode gameplay, which now features two-on-two tag battles in online multiplayer (introduced "due to high demand from DOA fans around the world"). Several of them are supposed to make the new tag team mode better suited for competitive play by high-level players, including a restriction to the amount of health that can be recovered by the character that is tagged out and stays in the background, and a new Tag mode specific attack, called the Force Out, which knocks the opponent's current character out of the ring and forces the opponent to use just the other tag partner for a period of time. The game also features many new tag poses and tag throws unique for various tag teams (depending on the characters that were chosen for the team), as well as new taunts and appeals. The developer Team Ninja also promised to smooth the online fights and shorten the match-finding wait times, while a new system of Character Points is supposed to let the players know how good their opponents are with the currently selected fighters (similar to Street Fighter IV's Battle Points), as well as their world rank.

Similar to in DOA5 Plus, the players are also able to choose their own custom music outside Dead or Alive series for the fights; Ultimate also features' the returning characters' past themes. The game comes with new costumes for all characters and includes some of downloadable content (DLC) costume packs from the original game (now as just unlockable content); the remaining DLC costumes (Costume Packs 3, 6, 7 and 8) are not included in the game but can be used with DOA5 Ultimate if they were purchased for DOA5. The game features a total of 231 costumes (more than twice increase from 114 alternate outfits in the original DOA5) that are to be unlockable using new system of Grade Points the players might earn by winning the matches as Prize Fighters in four levels (Bronze, Silver, Gold and Platinum).

== Characters ==
The entire character roster in the game (selected are the series' newcomers Rachel and Momiji, and the returnees Ein and Hitomi); the lower-left random select slot is replaced by Marie Rose, Leon switch side in replacing lower right random select while only one random select below Alpha-152 once again, Phase-4 is below Hayate, and Nyotengu is below Ryu Hayabusa in Arcade and DLC updates

The game adds five more playable characters to the original roster of Dead or Alive 5, for a total of 29 fighters. Three more characters (Marie Rose, Phase-4 and Nyotengu) were added to the roster later, for a total of 32.

=== New ===
- Jacky Bryant, an American indy car racer, Sarah Bryant's older brother, and a new guest character from the Virtua Fighter series, mainly based on his appearance in the Virtua Fighter 5 series. He uses Bruce Lee's fighting style jeet kune do. He only speaks in English.
- Marie Rose, a young Swedish maid who uses systema and servant of Helena Douglas. She is the new character in Arcade Edition in Japan. She was added to console versions in March 2014.
- Momiji, a Japanese kunoichi and the Dragon Ninja clan's shrine maiden from the Ninja Gaiden series. She has become Ryu Hayabusa's disciple to learn unarmed combat and is using ninpo and aikijujutsu.
- Nyotengu, a female tengu, who uses attacks similar to those of Tengu (Gohyakumine Bankotsubo) from previous games. She was added to the console versions in September 2014.
- Phase-4, another of Kasumi's clones and a final version of Alpha Project, who briefly appeared in the post credit of the original Dead or Alive 5 Story Mode. She was added to the console versions in June 2014.
- Rachel, a human/fiend hybrid fiend hunter from the Vigoor Empire, and a friend of Ryu Hayabusa. She is another character from the Ninja Gaiden series. In DOA5 Ultimate, Rachel is a heavyweight power-type fighter of a weight class similar to that of Leon, and her fighting style is reminiscent of Spartan-458's in Dead or Alive 4.

=== Returning ===
- Ein, the ninja Hayate's karateka alter-ego. He is a returning character from the earlier titles in the DOA series.
- Leon, a former sambo practitioner from Italy who has become a close-quarters combat fighter. He too is a returning character from the earlier DOA games.

== Development ==
Previously in 2012, the series' producer Yosuke Hayashi has stated they will not be releasing additional characters or stages as DLC for the original version of DOA5, as Team Ninja views it as unfair to players who cannot afford to pay for the DLC and because it will make it harder to balance the game. A teaser trailer showing Momiji in a new version of DOA5 was shown on April 28, 2013 at a Playse event in Tokyo. On May 8, Famitsu revealed it as Dead or Alive 5 Ultimate, set to be released sometime in fall 2013, and to include all of new content from Dead or Alive 5 Plus and to feature more characters and stages. Later that same month, the launch date was announced as September 3, 2013.

The game's director Yohei Shimbori said: "Since we launched Dead or Alive 5, we received a lot of feedback from fans around the world. DoA5 Ultimate is a reflection of that feedback we received." He added: "We received a lot of feedback on stages, and we've really heard our fans loud and clear on what they wanted." The most requested stages to make a comeback included the Forest and Lost World stages from Dead or Alive 3; another popular request was for a stage with an uneven grounding, resulting in the creation of the Desert Wasteland stage. Team Ninja has held contests to design DLC costumes.

== Release ==
Dead or Alive 5 Ultimate for the PlayStation 3 and Xbox 360 was released first in North America on September 3, 2013, followed by Japan on September 5, Europe on September 6, and Australia on September 26. The official guide book Dead or Alive 5 Ultimate Master Guide (DEAD OR ALIVE 5 Ultimateマスターガイド, Deddo Oa Araibu Faibu Arutimetto Masutā Gaido) was released in Japan on the same day as the game.

=== Promotion ===
It was announced that the game's Japan-only limited edition titled Kasumi-chan Blue & Momiji Red Package contains Dead or Alive 5 Original Soundtrack Volume 3, a set of 12 "I'm a Fighter" posters, "Kasumi-chan Blue" and "Momiji Red" 3D mousepads, Kasumi and Momiji themed playing cards, life-size tapestries and bath posters, and download codes for the "Ultimate Sexy" and "Idol" costume packs. The Kasumi-chan Blue and Momiji Red editions contain only either Kasumi or Momiji themed bonuses. A standard collector's edition includes a soundtrack CD, "Kasumi-chan Blue" 3D mousepad, Kasumi playing cards, and a code for the "Ultimate Sexy Costume".

Tecmo Koei Europe offered exclusive downloadable in-game costumes (the packs J-Pop, Schoolgirl and Bad Girl) as pre-order bonuses, making them available for the different characters depending on a given retailer: Kokoro, Leifang, Hitomi and Mila from GAME, and Kasumi and Ayane from Amazon. Exclusive costumes for Christie, Helena, Lisa, Rachel, Tina and Momiji were made available via indie retailers through CentreSoft.

In Japan, first-print copies of Tecmo Koei's Musou Orochi 2 Ultimate (Warriors Orochi 3 Ultimate) were bundled with DLC codes for special “Orochi” themed DOA5U costumes for Kasumi, Ayane and Momiji. Tokyo Game Show themed booth babe costume for Kasumi was released as a free downloadable content. Bonus DLC costumes for Ryu and Momiji were announced to come with the special edition of Yaiba: Ninja Gaiden Z.

=== Core Fighters ===
A free digital version of the game, titled Dead or Alive 5 Ultimate: Core Fighters, was released on the PlayStation Store alongside the retail version. Hayashi said he wants to introduce more people to the genre and make them interested, hoping it might help to bring back the fighting games' golden era of the 1990s. Soon after the announcement of Core Fighters, Namco Bandai announced and quickly released Tekken Revolution, their own take on a concept of a free-to-play fighting game.

Core Fighters features four playable characters (Ryu Hayabusa, Kasumi, Hayate and Ayane) and almost all of the game's modes, whilst additional playable characters (for $4 each) and the game's Story Mode (for $15) may purchased separately as DLC (Core Fighters is compatible with DLC costumes from DOA5, but comes with no free additional costumes). The digital version has only been announced for PlayStation 3, with an Xbox 360 release slated as 'possible'.

=== Arcade ===
Dead or Alive 5 Ultimate: Arcade was the first official DOA arcade release since Dead or Alive 2 Millennium in January 2000. Arcade was released only in Japan December 24, 2013, running on Sega RingEdge 2 hardware and using use Sega's ALL.Net P-ras MULTI Ver. 2 content digital distribution platform. Arcade introduced new characters Marie Rose, Phase-4 and Nyotengu.

== Reception ==
Reception

Aggregate score
Aggregator	Score
Metacritic	(PS3) 77/100 (X360) 75/100

Review scores
Publication	Score
Electronic Gaming Monthly	7.5/10
Famitsu	34/40
GameRevolution	4/5
Official Xbox Magazine (US)	8/10

Award
Publication	Award
PlayStation Universe	Gamescom 2013 Awards: Best Fighting Game

The game was received well by most critics, resulting in averaged score of 77/100 at Metacritic for the PlayStation 3 version, along with 75/100 for the Xbox 360 version. Famitsu gave it a positive first review and a total of 34/40 (9/9/8/8 out of 10 from the four reviewers). Eric L. Patterson of Electronic Gaming Monthly recommended Ultimate for new players, adding that "hopefully, both this full release and Core Fighters will help revive interest in the game's competitive scene." Hedi Kemps of Official Xbox Magazine wrote that "despite issues regarding its distribution method, DoA5 Ultimate remains a fun, gorgeous, and accessible fighter, made sweeter by the wealth of new content. There's no better time to hop into the ring."

Ryan King of NowGamer gave the PS3 version a score of 7.5/10, adding that "shallow but fun" Ultimate "has packed in a wealth of content alongside its solid fighting game core for a low price." Tom's Guide's Mike Andronico, who awarded both versions of the game four out of five stars, wrote that it is "a satisfying update to the DoA experience, for just $40," but cautioned that "casual fans content with last year's copy of Dead or Alive 5 might not want to buy another game so soon." According to Hardcore Gamer's Adam Beck, however, "there's something here for everyone;" he rated the PS3 version a 4/5, calling it the series' "most complete and robust experience yet."

By the end of 2013, Dead or Alive 5 Ultimate sold over 140,000 copies worldwide.

== See also ==
- Dead or Alive 5 Last Round
