= Honoka (Dead or Alive) =

Dead or Alive character

- Dead or Alive character
- Honoka in Dead or Alive 5: Last Round (2015)
- First game: Dead or Alive 5: Last Round (2015)
- Designed by: Natsuko "Fubuki" Kawakami
- Voiced by: EN: Kira Buckland; JA: Ai Nonaka

In-universe information
- Origin: Japan
- Nationality: Japanese
- Fighting style: "Honoka Fu"

Honoka (ほのか) is a character in the Dead or Alive series by Koei Tecmo's Team Ninja development team. She made her debut in Dead or Alive 5 Last Round and is voiced by Kira Buckland in English and Ai Nonaka in Japanese.

== Conception and development ==
Honoka was designed by Natsuko Kawakami.

== Appearances ==
Honoka is an 18-year-old Japanese fighter who made her debut in Dead or Alive 5 Last Round as a downloadable content character. She is a self-taught martial arts fan capable of learning any fighting move that she sees and participated in the 5th tournament's Asian qualification. However, during one of her fights a mysterious inner energy went haywire knocking both Honoka and her opponent out. This caused her disqualification and Honoka herself can’t recall much of the incident.

In Dead or Alive 6, this incident catches MIST’s attention as the unknown power showed similarities to Raidou’s fighting mimicry. As part of a plan to resurrect him, both of her and Ayane end up captured by MIST and later it is confirmed they are half-sisters with Raidou as their common father. During the course of the story, the Mugen Tenshin ninjas save her and put Honoka under their protection.

== Promotion and reception ==
Honoka drawn by Kim Hyung-tae for a Dead or Alive Xtreme Venus Vacation × Destiny Child collaboration; she is a recurrent series pick for collaborations in other games

In merchandise, figures of Honoka have been produced by companies such as Kaiyodo and Freeing B-Style. Several 3D mousepads were also released, with the wrist rests designed to emphasize her large bust. She and Marie Rose were also featured on promotional swimsuit posters given out for pre-orders of Xtreme 3.

Nishikawa-kun of Famitsu stated that while she was a relatively newer character in the series, she became popular very quickly, called her figure "one of the nicest bodies in the series" due to her large bust size and interactions with the player in Venus Vacation. Stating that while she is portrayed as gentle and naive, he considered her lively personality adorable, and also voiced approval for her tendency to show a vulnerable side. In particular, he enjoyed her friendship with Marie Rose due to them sharing this characteristic, something he felt came across well when they interacted with fellow character Nyotengu.

Kim Young-hoon of Korean gaming outlet Gamemeca praised not only her appearance, describing her as "the most beautiful girl ever" in the series due to her figure, but also her charm in how she was a martial arts prodigy. Going further, he called it an intriguing premise, adding that while she lacked the strength to use them effectively she made up for it with versatility. Fellow writer Seo Hyung-Geol praised the introduction of Honoka and Marie Rose in Last Round, stating that while the conflict between series protagonists Kasumi and Ayane brought players to the series, it had become stale after twenty years and the franchise felt on the verge of collapse. By comparison, he felt the new pair not only reinvigorated the series, bringing a fresh charm to the series as the protagonists of Dead or Alive 6.

The staff of Kakuchopurei on the other hand voiced disdain for her character, regarding her only slightly better than Marie Rose in their eyes due to her prominent role in Dead or Alive 6, and considered her fighting style nonsensical. Instead they felt she was designed to cater to a schoolgirl fetish, something they felt was already done by other characters as is. Meanwhile, Matt Sainsbury of Digitally Downloaded saw her as an example of Tecmo taking virtual idols and recreating them into their games, comparing her to the Love Live! series character of the same name.

Dr. Ardian Indro Yuwono in a paper for Indonesian journal Interaksi examined the designs of several female characters in Dead or Alive 6, which included Honoka. In it, he described her as having a "fairly ample bust" and the most sexually appealing body proportions of the cast. He felt this coupled with her schoolgirl attire served the joshi kōsei archetype often seen in Japanese pornography, especially with consideration for her personality which he considered child-like. Examining the latter aspect further, Yuwono stated that such media often included such character to cater to those attracted to innocent or childish adult themes. He further argued that the emphasis of swimsuits in her regard was a form of "inappropriate forced sexualization", as bikinis were seldom appropriate attire for fighting and thus appeared strictly for the pleasure of the audience.
