= Team Ninja =

Japanese video game developer

- Native name: チームニンジャ
- Type: Division
- Industry: Video games
- Founded: 1995; 31 years ago (as Tecmo Creative #3) (1995-1999)
- Founder: Tomonobu Itagaki
- Headquarters: Kudankita, Tokyo, Japan
- Key people: Fumihiko Yasuda (president)
- Products: Dead or Alive series Ninja Gaiden series Nioh series
- Parent: Tecmo (1995–2010); Koei Tecmo (2010–present)
- Website: teamninja-studio.com

Team Ninja (Japanese: チームニンジャ) is a Japanese video game developer and a division of Koei Tecmo. It was founded in 1995 as Tecmo Creative #3, a division of Tecmo headed by Tomonobu Itagaki. It is best known for its expertise in action games as well as its signature franchises such as the Ninja Gaiden, Dead or Alive and Nioh series.

After Itagaki's departure in 2008, Yosuke Hayashi was the team lead until his departure in 2022. He was replaced by Fumihiko Yasuda.

== History ==
=== Founding and Itagaki-led era (1995–2008) ===
Team Ninja was formed by Tomonobu Itagaki as Tecmo Creative #3. The team was formed from a group of game designers working at Tecmo specifically for the purpose of creating the home versions of the fighting game series Dead or Alive. During the mid-1990s, Japanese gaming company Tecmo was in financial trouble. Seeing how popular Sega's Virtua Fighter series was in Japan at the time, the management asked Tomonobu Itagaki to create a game similar to Virtua Fighter. In order to stand out from other fighting games, Team Ninja focused on making Dead or Alive fast-paced and provocative. Itagaki believed that violence and sexuality were needed for "true entertainment". The Dead or Alive series became a critical and commercial success, and was also a key part in saving Tecmo from bankruptcy.

In 1999, the division was renamed Team Ninja to give Tecmo an identity and be recognized as an elite team. That same year, Team Ninja started work on a new Ninja Gaiden project, originally intended for arcades, later for the Dreamcast. Due to Sega exiting the console business, development was moved to the PlayStation 2. However, due to Itagaki being impressed by the technological capabilities of the new Xbox from Microsoft, development was moved to that platform. Ninja Gaiden was released in 2004 to acclaim. In 2008, the action-adventure game Ninja Gaiden II for the Xbox 360 was published by Microsoft Game Studios, making it the first game created by Team Ninja to not be published by Tecmo; Tecmo Koei later released an enhanced version of Ninja Gaiden II on the PlayStation 3 as Ninja Gaiden Sigma 2.

=== Itagaki's departure and lawsuits (2008–2009) ===
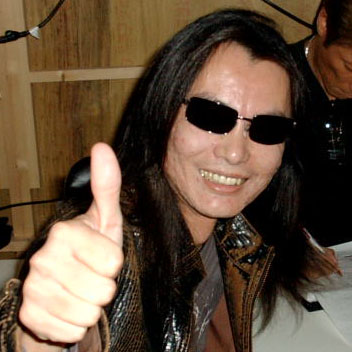
Tomonobu Itagaki at Tokyo Game Show 2004

Tomonobu Itagaki was promoted to Tecmo Executive Officer in June 2004 and to General Manager in 2006, alongside his position as the head of Team Ninja. In 2007 due to a lawsuit regarding alleged sexual harassment, his manager roles were revoked. Although he was later judged innocent by a Tokyo district court, the lawsuit strained his relationship with Tecmo. On June 3, 2008, Itagaki announced that he was leaving Tecmo and Team Ninja on July 1, 2008. He also announced that he was filing a lawsuit against the Tecmo president, Yoshimi Yasuda, over unpaid bonuses for his work on Dead or Alive 4. It was later reported that he was fired from Tecmo on June 18, 2008, in retaliation for his lawsuit. Another lawsuit followed shortly after which was filed on 16 June by two plaintiffs on behalf of Tecmo's 300 employees for unpaid wages amounting to ¥8.3 million. Many Team Ninja staff quit to join Itagaki's new studio, Valhalla Game Studios. Some ex-Team Ninja members also helped with Ubisoft's Teenage Mutant Ninja Turtles: Smash-Up. The parties settled in February 2010 for an undisclosed amount.

=== Merger with Koei and restructuring (2009–2013) ===
In 2009, it was announced that Tecmo and Koei would be merging. The newly founded Koei Tecmo disbanded Tecmo in 2010. A year later all of Tecmo's assets were absorbed into Koei Tecmo, including IP and its subsidiaries and divisions. Team Ninja continued as subsidiary of Koei Tecmo.

Team Ninja collaborated on multiple titles with Nintendo. In 2010, Team Ninja co-developed a new Metroid action-adventure game for Nintendo's Wii console, titled Metroid: Other M. A playable Stage from Other M appeared in the Nintendo 3DS game Dead or Alive: Dimensions, which was published by Nintendo in Europe and Australia. Team Ninja in 2014 also collaborated with Omega Force on the development of Hyrule Warriors, an action game set in The Legend of Zelda universe, and with SEGA AM2 since 2012's Dead or Alive 5, co-developing an Arcade version of the title, as well as on bringing characters from Virtua Fighter to Dead or Alive.

=== Hayashi leadership and split into two subteams (2013–2022) ===
In 2013, following a reconstructing of Koei Tecmo, Team Ninja ceased to exist internally, being renamed Koei Tecmo Ichigaya, with Yosuke Hayashi subsequently becoming Head of the Ichigaya Development Group. The developer was also split into two distinct development teams, one led by Ninja Gaiden Sigma director Yosuke Hayashi and one led by Fatal Frame producer Keisuke Kikuchi. Further restructuring at Koei Tecmo in 2016 resulted in Team Tachyon, the developers behind Quantum Theory as well as Rygar: The Battle of Argus being shut down. A large amount of developers were moved to Team Ninja.

Team Ninja's booth at TGS 2017

In 2017, Team Ninja released their new action role-playing game Nioh to positive reviews. It originally development in 2004 at Koei, and was moved between multiple developers, such as Omega Force, before Koei approached Team Ninja after the merger in 2010 to help develop the game. When first presented with the project by Koei, Team Ninja staff were skeptic about the game's concept, citing the western protagonist in Sengoku-era Japan, as well as various mechanics. Despite these uncertainties, development was fully transferred to Team Ninja in 2012. Nioh received multiple awards, and became Team Ninja's best-selling game. They released Marvel Ultimate Alliance 3: The Black Order for the Nintendo Switch in 2019 as well as Dead or Alive 6. Team Ninja released the prequel to Nioh, Nioh 2, in March 2020. A compilation of Ninja Gaiden series, Ninja Gaiden: Master Collection, released in June 2021. Team Ninja also developed Stranger of Paradise: Final Fantasy Origin, which released in 2022.

=== Yasuda leadership and 30th anniversary (2022–present) ===
As of 2022, Yosuke Hayashi had left Team Ninja to serve as the general manager of Koei Tecmo's entertainment division, with Fumihiko Yasuda replacing him as president. Wo Long: Fallen Dynasty was announced the same year, being produced by Team Ninja lead Fumihiko Yasuda, who led the development on Nioh and Nioh 2, as well as Masaaki Yamagiwa. Yamagiwa, who joined Team Ninja in 2021 after the closure of Sony Interactive Entertainment's Japan Studio, was previously producer on Bloodborne. It released in 2023. Rise of the Rōnin, another collaboration with Sony, was released in 2024. Team Ninja celebrated its 30th anniversary in 2025. Ninja Gaiden 4 and Nioh 3 were revealed and due to release on October 21, 2025, and in early 2026 for this occasion.

== Controversies ==
=== Depiction of women ===
Team Ninja's provocative style, originally coined by Itagaki, is a point of contention in discussion of its works. While often having been praised, with Dead or Alive's Kasumi being regarded as a sex symbol and MTV UK labeling her as one of the sexiest characters in video games, Team Ninja has also been accused of objectifying women. In a 2012 Interview with Kotaku, Yosuke Hayashi said that Team Ninja was "very misinterpreted" outside of Japan, and that there was no derogatory intention in their creation process: "We can't help if other cultures in other countries around the globe think that it's a bad representation." In 2016, Team Ninja garnered attention after their decision to not release Dead or Alive Xtreme 3 in North America or Europe, reigniting a controversy within the video game industry about the sexualised portrayal of female characters within their games. Shuhei Yoshida, president of Sony Interactive Entertainment at the time, said that Europe and North America have cultural differences about how to depict women in media.

=== Violence in Ninja Gaiden II ===
In 2008, the German Rating Board USK refused classification for Ninja Gaiden II, banning it for sale in Germany for its excessive violence. The publisher, Microsoft, had no interest in releasing a cut version. This affected the development of the PlayStation 3 version, Sigma 2, as the violence was significantly toned down. Sigma 2 received classification in Germany.

=== Dead or Alive: Dimensions ban in Sweden and Australia ===
In 2011, Dead or Alive: Dimensions was banned in Sweden, due to the rating board determining that the characters appeared too young. Due to Sweden's ban on the title, Australian politician Brendan O'Connor urged the Australian Classification Board to reexamine the title, resulting in the game getting its classification revoked and being removed from sale. Nintendo, the publisher of the game in Europe, Australia, and New Zealand, stated that Dead or Alive: Dimensions contained no objectionable content and resubmitted the game. The classification was reinstated shortly thereafter.

=== EVO Japan 2019 shutdown ===
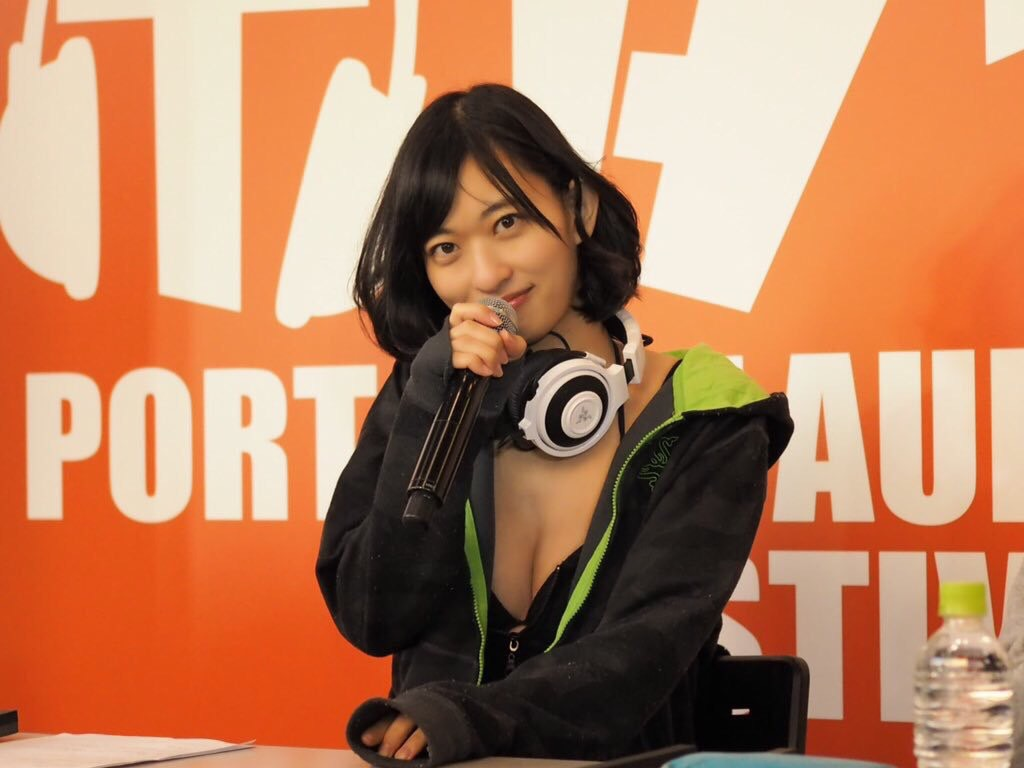
Yuka Kuramochi, one of the idols present at Team Ninja's EVO 2019 stream

In 2019, Team Ninja garnered controversy due to a livestream of Dead or Alive 6 at Evo Japan 2019 featuring gravure idols. The livestream was forcibly shut down by the Evolution Championship Series. The co-founder and CEO of EVO, Joey Cuellar, issued an apology saying that "the stream does not reflect the core values of EVO" and that they had to end the stream to "protect the integrity" of EVO. Mark Julio, head of global business at EVO, appeared live during the tournament to issue an apology, saying that the content showcased by a partner of EVO would not "reflect the content and intention" of EVO. Evo 2020 was cancelled and Cuellar removed as CEO due to a history of sexual abuse towards male minors coming to light.

=== Rise of the Rōnin not releasing in South Korea ===
According to reports, Rise of the Rōnin would not be released in South Korea, due to Fumihiko Yasuda comparing Shoin Yoshida, a controversial figure in South Korea, to Socrates. In a statement to gameindustry.biz, Sony gave official confirmation that the game would not release in South Korea, but did not provide a reason.

== Games ==
Title	Release year	Genre	Platform(s)	Notes
Dead or Alive	1996	Fighting game	Arcade, Saturn, PlayStation	
Dead or Alive 2	1999	Fighting game	Arcade, Dreamcast, PlayStation 2	Credited as "Team Ninja - Tecmo Creative #3"
Dead or Alive 3	2001	Fighting game	Xbox	
Dead or Alive Xtreme Beach Volleyball	2003	Sports, Party	Xbox	
Ninja Gaiden	2004	Action-adventure, hack and slash	Xbox	
Dead or Alive Ultimate	2004	Fighting game	Xbox	Port of the Sega Saturn version of Dead or Alive and remake of Dead or Alive 2.
Ninja Gaiden Black	2005	Action-adventure, hack and slash	Xbox	Enhanced version of Ninja Gaiden.
Dead or Alive 4	2005	Fighting game	Xbox 360	
Dead or Alive Xtreme 2	2006	Sports, party	Xbox 360	
Ninja Gaiden Sigma	2007	Action-adventure, hack and slash	PlayStation 3, PlayStation Vita	Altered version of Ninja Gaiden. Published by Eidos Interactive in PAL regions.
Ninja Gaiden: Dragon Sword	2008	Action-adventure, hack and slash	Nintendo DS	
Ninja Gaiden II	2008	Action-adventure, hack and slash	Xbox 360	Published by Microsoft Game Studios.
Ninja Gaiden Sigma 2	2009	Action-adventure, hack and slash	PlayStation 3, PlayStation Vita	Altered version of Ninja Gaiden II.
Metroid: Other M	2010	Action-adventure	Wii	Co-developed with Nintendo SPD, published by Nintendo.
Dead or Alive: Dimensions	2011	Fighting game	Nintendo 3DS	Published by Nintendo in PAL regions.
Ninja Gaiden 3	2012	Action-adventure, hack and slash	PlayStation 3, Xbox 360	
Ninja Gaiden 3: Razor's Edge	2012	Action-adventure, hack and slash	PlayStation 3, Xbox 360, Wii U	Altered version of Ninja Gaiden 3. Wii U version published by Nintendo.
Dead or Alive 5	2012	Fighting game	PlayStation 3, Xbox 360	
Dead or Alive 5 Plus	2013	Fighting game	PlayStation Vita	Handheld version of Dead or Alive 5
Dead or Alive 5 Ultimate	2013	Fighting game	PlayStation 3, Xbox 360	Enhanced version of Dead or Alive 5, featuring additional characters and stages.
Yaiba: Ninja Gaiden Z	2014	Action-adventure, hack and slash	PlayStation 3, Xbox 360, Microsoft Windows	Co-developed with Spark Unlimited and Comcept.
Hyrule Warriors	2014	Action, hack and slash	Wii U, Nintendo 3DS, Nintendo Switch	Co-developed with Omega Force. Published by Nintendo outside Japan.
Dead or Alive 5 Last Round	2015	Fighting game	Microsoft Windows, PlayStation 3, PlayStation 4, Xbox 360, Xbox One	Enhanced version of Dead or Alive 5 Ultimate, featuring additional characters and stages.
Dissidia Final Fantasy NT	2015	Fighting game	Arcade, PlayStation 4	Published by Square Enix.
Dead or Alive Xtreme 3	2016	Sports, party	PlayStation 4, PlayStation Vita	Only released in Asia.
Nioh	2017	Action role-playing	PlayStation 4, Microsoft Windows, PlayStation 5	Co-developed with Kou Shibusawa. PlayStation versions published by Sony Interactive Entertainment outside of Japan.
Dead or Alive Xtreme Venus Vacation	2017	Sports management	Microsoft Windows, macOS	Steam version only released in specific Asia regions. DMM GAMES version only released in Japan.
Dissidia Final Fantasy Opera Omnia	2017	Role-playing	Android, iOS	Published by Square Enix.
Fire Emblem Warriors	2017	Action, hack and slash	New Nintendo 3DS, Nintendo Switch	Co-developed with Omega Force.
Dead or Alive 6	2019	Fighting game	PlayStation 4, Xbox One, Microsoft Windows	
Dead or Alive Xtreme 3 Scarlet	2019	Sports, party	PlayStation 4, Nintendo Switch	Only released in Asia.
Marvel Ultimate Alliance 3: The Black Order	2019	Action	Nintendo Switch	Published by Nintendo.
Nioh 2	2020	Action role-playing	PlayStation 4, Microsoft Windows, PlayStation 5	Co-developed with Kou Shibusawa. PlayStation versions published by Sony Interactive Entertainment outside of Japan.
Ninja Gaiden: Master Collection	2021	Action-adventure, hack and slash	Microsoft Windows, Nintendo Switch, PlayStation 4, Xbox One	A compilation of Ninja Gaiden Sigma, Ninja Gaiden Sigma 2 and Ninja Gaiden 3: Razor's Edge.
Stranger of Paradise: Final Fantasy Origin	2022	Action role-playing	Microsoft Windows, PlayStation 4, PlayStation 5, Xbox One, Xbox Series X/S	Published by Square Enix.
Wo Long: Fallen Dynasty	2023	Action role-playing	Microsoft Windows, PlayStation 4, PlayStation 5, Xbox One, Xbox Series X/S, Nintendo Switch 2	
Atelier Resleriana: Forgotten Alchemy & the Liberator of Polar Night	2023	Role-playing	Microsoft Windows, Android, iOS	Co-developed with Gust and Akatsuki Games.
Rise of the Rōnin	2024	Action role-playing, open-world	PlayStation 5, Microsoft Windows	Development assisted by XDev. PlayStation version published by Sony Interactive Entertainment.
Ninja Gaiden 2 Black	2025	Action-adventure, hack and slash	Microsoft Windows, PlayStation 5, Xbox Series X/S	Unreal Engine 5 remaster of Ninja Gaiden II.
Venus Vacation Prism: Dead or Alive Xtreme	2025	Dating sim	Microsoft Windows, PlayStation 4, PlayStation 5	Only released in Asia.
Ninja Gaiden 4	2025	Action-adventure, hack and slash	Microsoft Windows, PlayStation 5, Xbox Series X/S	Co-developed with PlatinumGames. Published by Xbox Game Studios.
Nioh 3	2026	Action role-playing, open-world	PlayStation 5, Microsoft Windows	
Fatal Frame II: Crimson Butterfly Remake	2026	Survival horror	Microsoft Windows, PlayStation 5, Xbox Series X/S, Nintendo Switch 2	Remake of Fatal Frame II: Crimson Butterfly
Dead or Alive 6 Last Round	2026	Fighting game	PlayStation 5, Xbox Series X/S, Microsoft Windows	
Wo Long 2: Wings of Ember	2027	Action role-playing	Microsoft Windows, PlayStation 5, Xbox Series X/S, Nintendo Switch 2	
Dead or Alive New Project	TBA	TBA	PlayStation 5	

=== Cancelled games ===
- Dead or Alive: Code Chronos - A prequel to the Dead or Alive series which was going to focus on the backstory of Kasumi and Ayane and reportedly was not going to be a fighting game. It was cancelled in November 2010.
- Project Progressive - A project that was originally planned for the Xbox, but its development moved to the Xbox 360. It was cancelled in November 2010.
- Ninja Gaiden 3DS - A Nintendo 3DS project announced by Team Ninja in 2011. It was quietly cancelled at a later date.
