= Dead or Alive Xtreme 3 =

2016 video game

- Cover art for Dead or Alive Xtreme 3: Fortune featuring Marie Rose (left) and Honoka (right)
- Developer: Team Ninja
- Publisher: Koei Tecmo: SK: Digital Touch
- Director: Yohei Shimbori
- Producer: Yosuke Hayashi
- Designers: Takayuki Saga; Tsuyoshi Iuchi
- Artist: Kazuhiro Nishimura
- Series: Dead or Alive Xtreme
- Engine: Soft Engine
- Platforms: PlayStation 4 (Fortune/Scarlet); PlayStation Vita (Venus); Nintendo Switch (Scarlet)
- Release: March 24, 2016: Fortune and Venus PlayStation 4, PS Vita; AS: March 24, 2016 Scarlet PlayStation 4, Nintendo Switch; AS: March 20, 2019
- Genres: Sports, casino, dating sim
- Mode: Single-player

Dead or Alive Xtreme 3 (Note: Japanese: DEAD OR ALIVE XTREME(デッド オア アライブ エクストリーム) 3, Hepburn: Deddo oa Araibu Ekusutorīmu Surī; also known as DOA Xtreme 3 or DOAX3) is a 2016 sports video game developed by Team Ninja and published by Koei Tecmo. It was released on March 24, 2016, as Dead or Alive Xtreme 3: Fortune for PlayStation 4 and as Dead or Alive Xtreme 3: Venus for PlayStation Vita. An updated version for PlayStation 4 and Nintendo Switch, entitled Dead or Alive Xtreme 3: Scarlet was released on March 20, 2019.

== Gameplay ==
Dead or Alive Xtreme 3 is a sports game played from a third-person perspective and retains the camera mode from the earlier installments in the Dead or Alive Xtreme series. It features multiple gameplay modes, which includes mini-games such as beach volleyball and "butt battle". Game modes include beach flag, in which characters will compete in a race to retrieve a flag, and rock climbing. The feature which displays tan lines and swimsuit malfunctions is only available in PlayStation 4 version. In addition, there is a new suntanning system. As the player unlocks new costumes for one character, the items will also be available for use to all characters. There are also new modes like Girl Mode, where the player can take direct control of the girl they have selected, and Owner Mode, where the player becomes an owner of another island. The player is also able to initiate various activities with the girls, such as dating.

A new variation known as Photo Paradise was released in September 2016, allowing owners to take gravure pictures of the heroines in a variety of poses and swimsuits. The PlayStation Vita version uses the console's touch panel and gyro sensor features. The PS4 later added a virtual reality functionality.

== Development ==
The development of Dead or Alive Xtreme 3 was first disclosed by Team Ninja head Yosuke Hayashi during Dead or Alive Festival on August 1, 2015. It was officially unveiled one week later in Famitsu, and the first screenshots were published on August 21. The PlayStation 4 version of game features an improved breast physics engine from Dead or Alive 5 Last Round, called Soft Engine 2.0, with the PlayStation Vita version using Soft Engine Lite. The Soft Engine 2.0 also allows the developers to implement greater realism towards object interactions, such as clothing wetness and deformation. The PlayStation 4 version is compatible with the PlayStation VR headset system. The release date was originally scheduled for February 25, 2016, however it was later pushed back to March.

A free-to-play version of the game was released on May 16, 2016. The version contains all gameplay features and activities to try out, but the player can only play as Kasumi; all other characters need to be purchased additionally. Originally, the PlayStation VR support patch was meant to be included for October 13, 2016, but was recently delayed for unknown reasons. Support was made available on January 24, 2017.

During the 2018 Dead or Alive festival held in Japan in November, Koei Tecmo announced a new edition of the game, Dead or Alive Xtreme 3: Scarlet, would launch for the PlayStation 4 and the Nintendo Switch on March 20, 2019, in Japan and Asia at least, with pre-orders for the game opening on November 19, 2018.

== Characters ==
The original game's nine playable female characters were selected from the 15 candidates of the roster of Dead or Alive 5 Last Round as the ones whose paid character themes have been downloaded most by fans on the PlayStation Store, but only the downloads from Japan count. The top two characters will also be featured in the first-print run bonuses. The results were announced during Tokyo Game Show 2015. Originally, no additional characters are planned to be added through DLC until they were added in the updated versions prior to corresponding later titles. Characters who were originally added in Xtreme Venus Vacation, currently the returning Leifang and the new character Misaki are added exclusive in Scarlet update.

1. Marie Rose (17.6%)
2. Honoka (14.9%)
3. Kasumi (12.0%)
4. Ayane (8.2%)
5. Kokoro (8.0%)
6. Nyotengu (7.6%)
7. Hitomi (5.9%)
8. Momiji (5.1%)
9. Helena Douglas (4.9%)

== Release ==
Dead or Alive Xtreme 3 was released to Asian markets for PlayStation versions only, but following protests from fans, Hayashi said a version of the game "adjusted for North America" might come to the West if the demand is high enough. However, on November 24, 2015, Team Ninja posted on the franchise's Facebook page stating that they will not release the game in Western territories. The game was distributed in Asian territories, where it does contain an English language option, along with Simplified Chinese, Traditional Chinese and Korean language options.

Following the announcement not to release the PlayStation version of the game outside Asia, a public debate arose whether this was to avoid criticism of the sexualized portrayal of women in the games, or the comparatively low North American and European sales of the previous game in the Dead or Alive Xtreme series. Shuhei Yoshida, president of Sony Interactive Entertainment at the time, said in regard to Dead or Alive Xtreme 3 that Europe and North America have their cultural differences about how to depict women in video games and other media. In response to the decision not to distribute, the developer behind the adult puzzle game and dating sim HuniePop offered Koei Tecmo a million dollars for distribution rights in North America.

== Reception ==
Reception

Aggregate score
Aggregator	Score
Metacritic	PS4: 43/100

In the first week of its release, the Fortune version sold 44,723 copies while the Venus version sold 21,959 copies. In an April 2016 financial report, Koei Tecmo revealed that Dead or Alive Xtreme 3 collectively shipped 190,000 copies within a month. LewdGamer noted that the sales are higher than Koei Tecmo's Atelier Sophie: The Alchemist of the Mysterious Book (170K) and Romance of the Three Kingdoms 13 (180K), two titles in the same report which were out for months longer.

Play-Asia, an import game retailer, reported that they had their highest pre-order record yet with the release of Dead or Alive Xtreme 3. The prior record holder was the Japanese release of J-Stars Victory VS, a game which was initially considered unlikely to be localised due to rights limitations involving multiple anime licenses. Dead or Alive Xtreme 3 eventually broke Play-Asia sales records as well.

Famitsu reviewed both versions of the game 32/40 (8/8/8/8). Operation Rainfall gave Dead or Alive Xtreme 3 a score of 3 stars out of 5, and although they praised the graphics and visual engine, they found Dead or Alive Xtreme 3 to be more of a technical demo than a finished game. They also noted that the game has "lots of replay value."
