= Evo Japan 2019 =

2019 Japanese Evolution Championship Series
Tournament information
- Location: Fukuoka, Japan
- Dates: February 15–17, 2019
- Venue: Fukuoka Convention Center
- Purse: ¥10,000,000 (US $63165)

Final positions
- Champions: SFVAE: Yusuke Momochi; T7: Arslan "Arslan Ash" Siddique; GGXrdR2: "Samitto"; BBTAG: "Tomo/relo"; SC6: Kevin "Keev" Akre; KOF14: Murakami "M'" Masanobu

Tournament statistics
- Attendance: 13,000 (all three days)

The 2019 Japanese Evolution Championship Series, commonly referred to as Evo Japan 2019, was a fighting game event held in Fukuoka, Japan on February 15–17. This was the second Evo event to take place in Japan. The event offered tournaments for various fighting games, such as Street Fighter V, Tekken 7, and King of Fighters XIV.

== Games ==
Evo Japan 2019 featured six games in its lineup as announced through the office website. The lineup consisted of Street Fighter V: Arcade Edition, Tekken 7, King of Fighters XIV, BlazBlue: Cross Tag Battle, Soulcalibur VI, and Guilty Gear Xrd REV 2.

== Results ==
Street Fighter V: Arcade Edition
Place	Player	Alias	Character(s)
1st	(Japan) Yusuke Momochi	Victrix|Momochi	Zeku, Kolin
2nd	(Japan) Keita Ai	CYG|Fuudo	Birdie, R. Mika
3rd	(Japan)	Powell	Cammy
4th	(United States) Victor Woodley	REC|Punk	Karin, Nash
5th	(Japan) Koichiro Matsumoto	Yoshimoto|Jyobin	Necalli
5th	(Japan) Naoki Nemoto	Liquid|Nemo	Urien
7th	(Taiwan) Li-Wei Lin	UYO|OilKing	Rashid
7th	(Japan) Junichi Tanabe	Crusher	Birdie

Tekken 7
Place	Player	Alias	Character(s)
1st	(Pakistan) Arslan Siddique	VSLASH|Arslan Ash	Kazumi
2nd	(Philippines) Alexandre Laverez	PBE|AK	Shaheen, Paul
3rd	(South Korea) Jae-Hyeon Kim	CherryBerryMango	Jin, Noctis
4th	(Japan)	THY|Chikurin	Geese, Jin
5th	(United States) Jimmy Tran	WG|Jimmy J Tran	Bryan
5th	(South Korea)	Destiny	Geese, Asuka, Akuma
7th	(Thailand) Nopparut Hempamorn	WG|Book	Jin
7th	(South Korea) Choi Jinwoo	Saint	JACK-7

Guilty Gear Xrd REV 2
Place	Player	Alias	Character(s)
1st	(Japan)	WG|Samitto	Chipp
2nd	(Japan)	Chachacha	Kum
3rd	(Japan)	Tomo	Leo
4th	(Japan) Masahiro Tominaga	YG|Machabo	Ky, Sol
5th	(Japan)	310	Venom
5th	(Japan)	WG|Lox	Jam
7th	(Japan)	Nage	Faust
7th	(Japan)	Zadi	Raven

BlazBlue: Cross Tag Battle
Place	Player	Alias	Character(s)
1st	(Japan) Tomoyasu Nakata	Tsurugi|Tomo/Relo	Mai/Gordeau
2nd	(Japan)	Alcormakkos	Ruby/Gordeau
3rd	(Japan)	Hide	Ruby/Gordeau
4th	(Japan)	KYONOentremete	Mitsuru/Yuzuriha
5th	(Japan)	Shige	Orie/Izayoi
5th	(Japan)	Noble	Carmine/Es
7th	(Japan)	Pizamayo	Blake/Yuzuriha
7th	(Japan)	Gouda	Gordeau/Nu-13

Soulcalibur VI
Place	Player	Alias	Character(s)
1st	(France) Kevin Akre	SF|Keev	Nightmare
2nd	(Singapore) Jovian Chan	Shen Chan	Cervantes
3rd	(Japan)	SHK	Zasalamel
4th	(Singapore) Raymus Chang Jin Yuan	Shen Yuan	Siegfried, Sophitia
5th	(Japan)	Tamonegi	Maxi
5th	(Japan)	Shiwapon	Sophitia
7th	(South Korea)	KANG-MIN	Taki
7th	(Japan)	Jashin	Ivy

The King of Fighters XIV
Place	Player	Alias	Character(s)
1st	(Japan) Masanobu Murakami	Sanwa|M'	Shun'ei/Billy/Iori, Benimaru/Shun'ei/Iori
2nd	(Taiwan) Chiahung Lin	Blackwell|E.T.	Blue Mary/Billy/Oswald, Choi/Blue Mary/Oswald
3rd	(Japan)	Score	Choi/Najd/Mature, Najd/Heidern/Mature
4th	(Japan)	SR	Leona/Kim/Gang-Il
5th	(China) Zhuojun Zeng	DouyuTV|Xiao Hai	Alice/Blue Mary/Iori, Alice/Shun'ei/Iori
5th	(Japan)	Laggia	Alice/Blue Mary/Shun'ei
7th	(Hong Kong)	CG|Pineapple	Zarina/Hein/Oswald
7th	(Japan)	Akira	Alice/Blue Mary/Shun'eil, Alice/Shun'ei/Leona
