= Evo 2020 =

Esports event

2020 Evolution Championship Series
- Evolution Championship Series logo

Tournament information
- Location: Online
- Dates: Planned for July 4, 2020–August 2, 2020
- Venue: Online

The 2020 Evolution Championship Series (commonly referred to as Evo 2020 or EVO 2020) was a planned fighting game event. While a physical event was to have been in Las Vegas from July 31 to August 2, 2020, as part of the long-running Evolution Championship Series, due to the COVID-19 pandemic, the organizations cancelled the physical event, and instead planned a series of online events running from July 4 to August 2, 2020. The online event was later cancelled due to sexual misconduct allegations against organizer and co-founder Joey Cuellar.

== Original plan ==
Prior to the physical cancellation, Evo 2020 was slated to take place in the Mandalay Bay Hotel Resort and Casino in Las Vegas, Nevada on the weekend of July 31 to August 2, 2020. Joey Cuellar, main organizer of Evo 2020, revealed the main line-up of games to be played at the event on a Twitch livestream on February 4, 2020. The original line-up of games was to include:

- Under Night In-Birth Exe: Late[cl-r]
- Super Smash Bros. Ultimate
- Dragon Ball FighterZ
- Tekken 7
- Soulcalibur VI
- Street Fighter V: Champion Edition
- Samurai Shodown
- Granblue Fantasy Versus

The event was also to feature an eight-player invitation tournament of Marvel vs. Capcom 2, in order to celebrate the 20-year anniversary of the game. This competition was dubbed the "Tournament of Champions" and would include four previous Evolution Marvel vs. Capcom 2 champions, Justin Wong, Sanford Kelly, Michael "Yipes" Mendoza, and Duc Do.

Evo 2020 was to be the first time a main Evolution Championship event would lack a NetherRealm video game since 2010. NetherRealm's popular Mortal Kombat 11 saw a major tournament at Evo 2019, but was to be excluded in 2020. Arc System Works' BlazBlue: Cross Tag Battle was also to be absent at Evo 2020 despite recent updates, having been replaced with Granblue Fantasy Versus.

== Response to the COVID-19 pandemic ==
Due to the COVID-19 pandemic, various major sports events were cancelled in April, June, and July 2020. For example, other big fighting game events such as Norcal Regionals and Final Round were cancelled due to the COVID-19 pandemic. On March 18, Evo organizers posted a statement on their official Twitter account saying they would not yet cancel Evo 2020, but they were monitoring updates from the World Health Organization, the Centers for Disease Control and Prevention, local governments, and public health agencies. Mandalay Bay has currently suspended all operations, with no timeline to reopen the resort.

The EVO organizers officially announced that the physical event was cancelled on May 1, 2020, but were looking to replace it with online events. The online schedule was announced on May 13, 2020. All of the games originally planned for the event remained scheduled, with the exception of Super Smash Bros. Ultimate, which was removed from the lineup. Likewise, the Marvel vs. Capcom 2 "Tournament of Champions" exhibition event was also still planned to take place.

In addition, four open tournaments were scheduled to be available for anyone in the following games. These games were selected due to their use of "rollback" networking code (such as though the open-source GGPO) that allows for seemingly zero-latency online play.

- Mortal Kombat 11: Aftermath
- Killer Instinct
- Them's Fightin' Herds
- Skullgirls 2nd Encore

== Cancellation ==
At the start of July 2020, charges of sexual misconduct were leveled at EVO CEO Joey Cuellar. The EVO board released Cuellar on July 2 and replaced him with Tony Cannon as interim CEO but by then, several publishers including Capcom, Bandai Namco, NetherRealm, and Mane6 had decided to pull out from the event. The EVO board decided to cancel the event, refund those tickets and donate the remaining funds to Project HOPE.
