= Christie (Dead or Alive) =

Dead or Alive character

- Dead or Alive character
- Christie as seen in Dead or Alive 3
- First appearance: Dead or Alive 3 (2001)
- Created by: Tomonobu Itagaki
- Designed by: Tomonobu Itagaki; Yutaka Saito (DOA6)
- Voiced by: English: April Stewart (DOAX2–Dimensions); Laura Bailey (DOA5); Japanese: Kotono Mitsuishi
- Portrayed by: Holly Valance (film)

In-universe information
- Fighting style: Snake kung fu
- Origin: United Kingdom
- Nationality: British

Christie (Japanese: クリスティ, Hepburn: Kurisuti) is a character in the Dead or Alive fighting game series by Koei Tecmo. Introduced in Dead or Alive 3, she created designed by series creator Tomonobu Itagaki after a suggestion from the game's martial arts advisor to include a character that utilized snake kung fu. An assassin, Christie is initially hired by series villain Victor Donovan to keep an eye on Helena Douglas, heir of the DOATEC company. In English, she was voiced by April Stewart in all appearances up to Dead or Alive 5, where she was voiced by Laura Bailey instead. Meanwhile in Japanese, she is voiced by Kotono Mitsuishi.

== Conception and development ==
Created by Tomonobu Itagaki for Koei Tecmo's Dead or Alive franchise, she was introduced for Dead or Alive 3. While developing drunken boxing fighter Brad Wong, the martial arts advisor suggested they include a character that utilized snake kung fu as well. Itagaki agreed, and as it was a fighting style typically associated with assassins, developed a character around that. She was intended to be the "darkness" counterpart to previously established character Helena Douglas' "light", and primarily serve as part of the conflict surrounding Helena in the game's story. They found the fighting style to be simpler to implement than Helena's piguaquan martial art, but designed their own attacks as well to help make it appear more flashy.

The development team has expressed Christie is extremely popular amongst them, due in part to her strength and quick movements that made her easy to play. When working on Dead or Alive 6, the game's art director Yutaka Saito was considered to be the most knowledgeable about the character, and was given free range to work on her for the game with game director Yohei Shimbori contributing line drawings and new fighting techniques for her gameplay. Shimbori felt that when a character was developed by someone that liked them, the outcome would be great, and chose to kept his comments to a minimum during the development process.

=== Design ===
Standing 177 centimetres (5 ft 9 1/2 in) tall and having measurements of 93-59-88 cm (37-23-35 in), Christie is a British woman with pale skin and white hair in a bobcut that flares around her head. Her earliest design featured a more simple hairstyle, and an outfit described as a "stage battle costume" consisting of a halter top with belts fastened around the torso and neck, pants with the zipper lowered, and wires with lights surrounding her. The finalized design was heavily simplified, giving her instead a white bodysuit with black highlights and plunging cleavage. While Christie has had several other outfits throughout the series, particularly attire such as a red trenchoat, black formal suit with open jacket, or leather dominatrix outfit, the bodysuit has remained a constant in most of her appearances.

With Dead or Alive 5, they wanted her movement to feel more like a snake to match her martial art. However, this became difficult due to how some aspects of her gameplay had changed between 3 and 4, and overhauled several aspects of her character to get the intended result, building the new movements to work with her existing sidestep motion. Later, when examining her character design for Dead or Alive 6, they felt she needed a new style to represent her current appearance as an assassin or operative. After several options were considered, her default outfit was changed to a black sleeveless turtleneck sweater, leather pants with two belts strapped around the right hip, and fingerless gloves.

== Appearances ==
In the Dead or Alive series, Christie is a professional assassin who relishes her occupation for the act of killing rather than the financial reward. She employs any means necessary to attain her mission objectives, including using her looks, charm, and sex appeal to lure her intended victims, though on occasion she will flirt with her male targets in lieu of killing them.

Victor Donovan, a powerful antagonistic figure in the Dead or Alive Tournament Executive Committee (DOATEC), hires her as a double agent to keep an eye on Helena Douglas, daughter of Fame Douglas and the heir of DOATEC. During the events of the original Dead or Alive, Christie joins another of Donovan's hired killers, Bayman, in assuring that the ninja Kasumi enters the tournament. Christie abducts and brings Kasumi to Donovan for Project Alpha.

Before the events of Dead or Alive 2 (1999), in which Christie is not playable, she is ordered by Donovan to assassinate Helena Douglas, who had inherited DOATEC after her father's death, in turn serving as a roadblock to Donovan's attempted takeover of the tournament. Christie attempts to kill Helena with a sniper rifle but Helena's mother Maria intentionally takes the fatal bullet instead. Christie manages to escape and succeeds in later posing as Helena's personal assistant.

Christie is player-controllable for the first time in Dead or Alive 3. Her objective therein is to prevent Helena from winning the third Dead or Alive tournament, and in the process prevent her from uncovering more of Donovan's plans. When she does confront Helena, she is stopped by Bayman, who is seeking revenge on Donovan for having ordered a hit on him. Christie commands a clone of Kasumi to defeat Helena, a task that fails. Christie kidnaps CIA agent Irene Lew to lure the ninja Ryu Hayabusa away from his friends Hayate and Ayane.

In Dead or Alive 4, Christie serves as Donovan's bodyguard, but they are unable to prevent the Mugen Tenshin ninja clan (Hayate, Ayane) and Ryu from destroying DOATEC's Tritower headquarters. As the tower is engulfed in flames, Christie finds Helena inside and reveals that she killed Maria. After an inconclusive fight, Christie flees the tower, while Helena is rescued from the building and becomes the new leader of the Dead or Alive tournaments. At the end of the game, Christie is shown stripping at a club, assassinating a man by seducing him and piercing a needle through his spinal cord. ^{A} Christie goes on to continue her work as an assassin for hire, a role she resumes in Dead or Alive Xtreme 2 (2006).

In Dead or Alive 5 (2012), she again serves under Donovan, this time for his new organization MIST. She visits a DOATEC oil platform and confronts worker Rig, insinuating that she knows about his past. She increases security on the rig at Donovan's command when he learns that the Mugen Tenshin plan on infiltrating it. However, she is defeated in battle by Bayman, and then Kasumi. The ninja clan ultimately destroys the rig, and Christie's whereabouts are unknown afterward.

In other media, Christie is a protagonistic character in the 2006 live-action film DOA: Dead or Alive, and was played by Australian actress and model Holly Valance. She was given the surname "Allen", while her hair is a normal blonde instead of the white from the games. Christie is depicted as more approachable and social than her in-game counterpart but retains her role of master thief and assassin, working with a noncanonical character named Max (Matthew Marsden) to steal Donovan's $100 million fortune hidden in a vault on the tournament grounds.

== Promotion and merchandise ==
Several pieces of merchandise have been released, including a gashapon figure by Epoch, and a figure by Kotobukiya designed to interact with and unlock voice lines for a Dead or Alive themed alarm clock. Meanwhile, to promote the PSP release of Dead or Alive Paradise, gravure photos of Christie alongside those of Helena and Leifang were included as a pre-order bonus.

Christie was well received upon debut. The staff of Kakuchopurei described her as an antagonist and sometimes anti-heroine of the series, further suggesting she had a tsundere personality. Additional praise was given to her fighting style and appearance, stating she looks "damn good in motion" and how well her white hair contrasted against darker outfits. Meanwhile, the staff of German magazine M! Games stated that while she arrived later in the series, she quickly attracted attention due to her provocative outfits and portrayal, which in their opinion helped her outshine "her more respectable competition". Mexican magazine Club Nintendo voiced similar sentiments, calling her a favorite amongst fans of the series. They added that while she was "analytical, quiet, cold, and even insensitive to others", which they attributed to her role as an assassin. They further praised the beauty of her fighting style as shown in-game as well as her portrayal in the DOA film, though acknowledged her character was significantly different.

Japanese magazine Game Hihyou meanwhile described her as "exuding sensuality", and further stated that her appearance conveyed an adult charm. In their analysis of 3D female video game characters and beauty, they examined her Dead or Alive 3 appearance alongside fellow character Hitomi in a discussion regarding the golden ratio of facial proportions, and the theory that beauty could be numerically quantified. Discussing how the facial aspects related to each other numerically, they felt with the golden ratio in mind it helped illustrate how the characters went from what could be considered "average face" to an "attractive head", and further were interested to see if developers kept such in mind when designing characters. However, when asking tourists in Japan's Akihabara district which of the female characters from 3 they preferred, they were surprised when an individual from the United Kingdom preferred Kasumi due to her "looking Japanese" and expressed disbelief that Christie was supposed to be British based on her facial appearance.

However, the character has also received some criticism. The staff of X360 blamed Dead or Alive 3's underperforming commercially in part due to the lack of a central character that could replace "two game old" series protagonist Kasumi, something they felt Christie specifically was unable to. Professor Joseph Hoffswell in a master's thesis for the Northern Illinois University's communications program cited Christie as an example of how Xtreme 2 sexualized its characters, referencing her pole dance scene players can earn as an in-game reward. Describing it as illustrating "the power of male gaze", he saw it as an unnecessary addition that catered to the male fantasy, contrasting the more relaxed and friendly aspects of the title. He further felt that despite her voice line indicating she enjoyed the action, it was contrary to the amount of power male characters were given over the character in this context, and saw the pole itself strictly representative of a giant phallus in this scope.

In third-party material, Christie was featured in a book titled Dead or Alive クリスティが教える蛇拳入門 (Dead or Alive: Christie's Introduction to Snake Style Kung Fu). Meant as a guide to learn the martial art, it was overseen by Ryu Hiun, the martial artist that suggested her inclusion in Dead or Alive 3, and was written in character with Christie giving instructions on how to perform the techniques.
