= Systema =

Russian combat and conditioning system

Systema (Russian: Система, romanized: Sistema, lit. 'system') is a Russian martial art. There are multiple schools of systems that began appearing after the end of the Soviet Union in the 1990s, with teachers claiming their respective "systems" (usually named after themselves). Training includes, but is not limited to: hand-to-hand combat, grappling, knife fighting, and firearms training. Training involves drills and sparring without set kata.
