= 2007 Championship Gaming Series draft =

The Region 1 2007 CGS Draft was held on June 12, 2007, at The Playboy Mansion in Bel Air, California.

This was the first ever draft for professional gaming, with Vanessa "Vanessa" Arteaga, being the first ever draft pick in the Championship Gaming Series.

The draft had 6 rounds with each team picking one gamer or a Counter Strike: Source team, the draft was in "snake" order meaning the team that had the first pick in the previous round will get the last pick in the next round, and vice versa.

== Lottery ==
The lottery was held during the Combine on June 11, 2007. The draft order is as follows:

Pick	Team
1	San Francisco Optx
2	Complexity LA
3	Dallas Venom
4	New York 3D
5	Chicago Chimera
6	Carolina Core

=== Region 1 ===
==== Round One ====
Pick	Nationality(s)	Gamer(s)	Game	CGS Franchise
1	(United States)	Vanessa "Vanessa" Arteaga	Dead or Alive 4	San Francisco Optx
2	(United States) (Sweden)	Team Complexity: (Warden, Rambo, fRoD, zet, Storm)	Counter Strike: Source	Complexity LA
3	(United States)	Manny "Master" Rodriguez	Dead or Alive 4	Dallas Venom
4	(United States) (Canada)	Team 3D: (KSharp, LiN, Volcano, Method, Rector)	Counter Strike:Source	New York 3D
5	(United States)	Wesley "ch0mpr" Cwiklo	Project Gotham Racing 3	Chicago Chimera
6	(Canada)	Ryan "OffbeatNinja" Ward	Dead or Alive 4	Carolina Core

==== Round Two ====
Pick	Nationality(s)	Gamer(s)	Game	CGS Franchise
7	(United States)	Joe "Phantom" Tackett	Project Gotham Racing 3	Carolina Core
8	(United States)	Jason "Jason X" Exelby	Project Gotham Racing 3	Chicago Chimera
9	(United States)	Chris "BadAXX" Bjorkman	Project Gotham Racing 3	New York 3D
10	(United States)	Jax Money Crew: (Dominator, kaM, exodus, zid, aZn)	Counter Strike:Source	Dallas Venom
11	(United States)	CJ "GeeTeeOhh" Nelson	Project Gotham Racing 3	Complexity LA
12	(United States)	Nolsen "beisbol" Perez	Project Gotham Racing 3	San Francisco Optx

==== Round Three ====
Pick	Nationality(s)	Gamer(s)	Game	CGS Franchise
13	(Italy)	Alessandro "stermy" Avallone	FIFA 07	San Francisco Optx
14	(United States)	Adande "sWooZie" Thorne	Dead or Alive 4	Complexity LA
15	(United States)	Kevin "chaos" Parrish	Project Gotham Racing 3	Dallas Venom
16	(Canada)	Matt "Wizakor" Wood	FIFA 07	New York 3D
17	(United States) (Canada)	Evil Geniuses: (Lari, Stevenson, tr1p, sunman, da bears)	Counter Strike:Source	Chicago Chimera
18	(United States)	Katherine "Mystik" Gunn	Dead or Alive 4	Carolina Core

==== Round Four ====
Pick	Nationality(s)	Gamer(s)	Game	CGS Franchise
19	(United States)	Brent "Rex" Dimapilis	Project Gotham Racing 3	Carolina Core
20	(United States)	Marjorie "Kasumi Chan" Bartell	Dead or Alive 4	Chicago Chimera
21	(United States)	Barry "DoubleB" Brady	Project Gotham Racing 3	New York 3D
22	(United States)	Cynthia "Raspberry Tea" Escamilla	Dead or Alive 4	Dallas Venom
23	(United States)	Javier "chavisan" Gutierrez	Project Gotham Racing 3	Complexity LA
24	(United States)	Cardell "Dave Chapelle" Thomas	Dead or Alive 4	San Francisco Optx

==== Round Five ====
Pick	Nationality(s)	Gamer(s)	Game	CGS Franchise
25	(United States)	Erika "skitt1es" Galegor	Project Gotham Racing 3	San Francisco Optx
26	(Bulgaria)	Phillipe "KreeganBG" Stoyne	FIFA 07	Complexity LA
27	(United States)	Isidro "Novusnaim" Sifuentes	FIFA 07	Dallas Venom
28	(United States)	Jared "cali jared" Singer	Dead or Alive 4	New York 3D
29	(United States)	Jeremy "Black Mamba" Florence	Dead or Alive 4	Chicago Chimera
30	(United States)	Nick "peekay" DePalmer	FIFA 07	Carolina Core

==== Round Six ====
Pick	Nationality(s)	Gamer(s)	Game	CGS Franchise
31	(United States)	Team Pandemic: (masternook, s0nNy, Devour, DAFF, elusive)	Counter Strike: Source	Carolina Core
32	(Canada)	Andrew "anomaly" Brock	FIFA 07	Chicago Chimera
33	(United States)	Tanya "coolsvilla" Underwood	Dead or Alive 4	New York 3D
34	(United States)	Patrick "Indigo Ferret" Wyrick	Project Gotham Racing 3	Dallas Venom
35	(United States)	Megan "Belle" Ceder	Dead or Alive 4	Complexity LA
36	(United States)	EFGaming: (clowN, mOE, Warmach1ne, p0s, phamtastik)	Counter Strike: Source	San Francisco Optx
