= Dead or Alive (franchise) =

Video game series

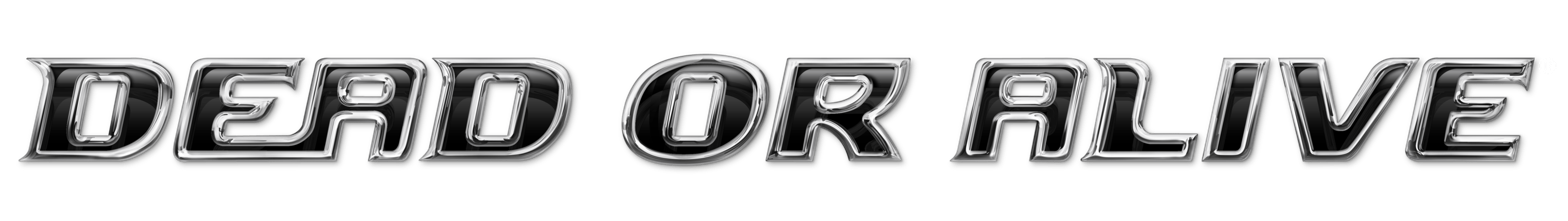
- Logo of the series since Dead or Alive 3
- Genre: Fighting
- Developer: Team Ninja
- Publishers: Tecmo (1996–2010); Koei Tecmo (2010–present)
- Creator: Tomonobu Itagaki
- Platforms: Arcade, Sega Saturn, PlayStation, Dreamcast, PlayStation 2, Xbox, Xbox 360, Windows, iOS, PlayStation Portable, Nintendo 3DS, PlayStation 3, PlayStation Vita, PlayStation 4, Xbox One, Android, Nintendo Switch, PlayStation 5, Xbox Series X/S
- First release: Dead or Alive; November 26, 1996
- Latest release: Dead or Alive 6 Last Round; June 25, 2026
- Spin-offs: Dead or Alive Xtreme series

Dead or Alive (Japanese: DEAD OR ALIVE(デッド オア アライブ), Hepburn: Deddo oa Araibu; abbreviated as DOA) is a Japanese media franchise centered on a series of fighting games developed by Team Ninja and published by Koei Tecmo (formerly Tecmo). The gameplay of the series is primarily composed of fast-paced hand-to-hand combat in a three-dimensional playing field that began with the first game released in 1996, followed by five main sequels, numerous updates, spin-offs, printed media, a film adaptation, and merchandise.

Set in the modern day, the series revolves around the events of the Dead or Alive World Combat Championship, an international martial arts tournament in which fighters from across the globe participate for the title of world champion and large cash prizes. The tournaments are held by the Dead or Alive Tournament Executive Committee (DOATEC). The conflict between the ninja competitors and DOATEC's personnel serves as the main focus of the series.

Dead or Alive has been a critical and commercial success, praised for its impressive fighting system, beautiful graphics, and interactive environments. The franchise has received numerous awards and accolades. Its sequels such as Dead or Alive 2 and Dead or Alive 3 received universal acclaim and are considered milestone titles in the fighting genre and gaming. (Note: Attributed to multiple references:) It has also gained notoriety, both positive and negative, for its sexualised female characters. Several characters of the series have made appearances and are referenced in other games while several games of the series have also been featured and referenced in other media. Dead or Alive's success sparked a renewal interest in Tecmo's Ninja Gaiden series. As of 2026, the franchise has sold over 11 million units worldwide. The franchise sales and free-to-play downloads combined totaled over 31 million units. (Note: Dead or Alive series sales as of 2026: Overall – 11 million units worldwide; Free-to-play downloads as of 2026: Dead or Alive 5: 12 million downloads; Dead or Alive 6: 8 million downloads)

== Gameplay ==
A tag throw by Helena Douglas and Leifang against Ayane in Dead or Alive Ultimate

The Dead or Alive series focuses on fast-paced gameplay in a three-dimensional playing field. Like other modern fighting games that attempt to emulate real life martial arts, DOA's input system is designed so controls correspond to the game character's actions; if the character moves forward with a punch, the controls most likely would include the punch input and pressing forward on the directional pad. In comparison to others in the fighting game genre, such as Virtua Fighter, the series places emphasis on striking characters quickly and efficiently. There is an emphasis on quick combos and air-juggles since the game's countering system and fast recovery times prevent slow, technical sets of moves in most instances. The series controls also make the instances of speed and simplicity more congruent with the focus of timing and combos in mind, as the commands for basic attacks are widely considered more straightforward than most video games. There is only one button for punch, kick, throw and guard, with the player rarely having to combine more than two different input schemes together at a time.

Evolution of the Hold mechanic input
Attack	DOA	DOA++	2 / 2M	3	2U	4	O	D	5	6
High P	H	H	F	F	F			H	H	
High K	H	H	F	F	F			H	H	
Middle P	H	H	F	F	F			H	H	
Middle K	H	H	F	F	F			H	H	
Low P	H	H	F	F	F			H	H	
Low K	H	H	F	F	F			H	H	

One of the series' most innovative additions to the genre is its countering system, officially known as the "Triangle System". The basic gameplay of the series is based on the Triangle System with three basic actions: Blows, Throws, and Holds; Blows beat Throws, Throws beat Holds, and Holds beat Blows. Beginning with the original Dead or Alive, players could tap the guard button and a direction corresponding with the anticipated attack, which would do a powerful counterattack known as Counter Hold. Counter Holds must be timed correctly and match the direction of the attack being countered. If the attack targets the torso, the player must also take into account whether the attack is a punch or a kick. The input for Holds has changed several times over the course of the series with the latest games adopting a 4-point Hold system, and some games offering the option to change the input type. This countering system further sets Dead or Alive apart as skilled players can identify combo patterns on defense and counter accordingly, which in turn encourages the opponent to adjust their offense on the fly to be less predictable and avoid being countered.

An example of one of the series' Danger Zones as seen in Dead or Alive 3. The character Ayane throws the character Leon through the window of a multi-storey building.

The series uses interactive features that appear in certain fighting arenas, called "Danger Zones". Fighters caught in a Danger Zone will take extra damage, giving the attacker a slight advantage. These environmental hazards can be anything from Falls to Explosives to Breakable Structures. If a fighter has low health, being trapped in a Danger Zone is more likely to knock them out than a normal attack, although in certain titles, elements such as falls cannot do this, and instead just leave the fighter with very low health.

In the first Dead or Alive, stages were simply fighting ring arenas and the Danger Zones were just explosive outer edges of the arena floors. In Dead or Alive 2, stage environments became larger and multi-tiered and the original Danger Zone was replaced with more fully interactive ones such as Falls off the Edge, Walls, Electrically Charged Walls, Explosive Walls, Breakable Walls and Windows. Players are also offered the ability to sidestep into the foreground or background.

Since Dead or Alive 2, the series has implemented its Tag team fighting system, allowing characters to switch back and forth instantly for combo attacks and even attack simultaneously when timed correctly. The Tag Mode also included special throws unique to certain pairs of characters called "Tag Throws", and the mode allows for the participation of four players, something not very common in the fighting game genre. Dead or Alive 3 introduced the "Attack Change" feature in the Tag mechanics where the fighting character can switch places with a partner, in which the character jumping in can then unleash an attack while jumping in. Since Dead or Alive 3, Tag matches can be selected in the other game modes.

Dead or Alive 3 improved upon the gameplay and graphics in superior detail compared to the previous games. The game offered unrestricted 3D-axis movements with better sidestepping, giving players the ability to dodge most attacks with a sidestep. The game added a new feature in its Sparring Mode called "Exercise" also known as "Command Training", an automatic command tutorial that teaches players how to perform attacks. The game expanded on the concept of multi-tiered environments, pushing the range of the stage sizes larger than that of its predecessors.

Dead or Alive 4 introduced the "Bounce Combo" system where players can perform further attacks to opponents who are bouncing off the floor or ground, and can also performed attacks on opponents while they are down. Moving Obstacles were introduced in certain stages as a type of Danger Zone that causes damage to fighters who are hit by them and using a counter hold at the right timing can help players avoid being hit by them. Jumping over non-moving Obstacles and performing flying attacks while jumping over them was also introduced. Dead or Alive: Dimensions utilizes the Nintendo 3DS bottom touchscreen in addition to the normal control system, offering optional touchscreen-based controls by tapping a move set to execute Blow combos, Throws, and Holds. Since Dimensions, the series supports in-game frame data that can be displayed during Training Mode.

Dead or Alive 5 uses a revamped control system and features a more cinematic experience, especially with regards to Danger Zone effects. "Power Blow" is a triggered powerful attack that can enable the player that is low on health to knock the opponent character away in a selected direction, possibly initiating a cinematic quick time event called Cliffhanger. The game's new Critical System features Critical Stuns, Critical Combos, and Critical Bursts. Dead or Alive 5 Ultimate further added the vertical Power Launcher and an extensive Tutorial mode. Dead or Alive 5 Plus for the PlayStation Vita features optional touchscreen-based controls from first-person perspective.

Dead or Alive 6 introduces both the Gauge System and costume customization. The Gauge System consists of the "Break Gauge", which allows numerous special moves to be performed depending on how full the gauge is, such as Fatal Rushes, Side Attacks, Break Holds, and Break Blows. The game also features an enhanced Bounce Combo system that allows players to bound their opponent on the ground for a finisher, with different inputs depending on the character.

The spin-off Xtreme series is mostly based around two-on-two matches of beach volleyball and casino gambling. After the original Dead or Alive Xtreme Beach Volleyball, the available activities have expanded to include the likes of watercraft racing and beach photography, while emphasizing the series' breast physics.

== Plot and characters ==
The main cast of Dead or Alive, from left to right, ninjas Kasumi, Ryu Hayabusa, Ayane and Hayate

The Dead or Alive series depicts a collection of skilled martial artists in a worldwide competition named the "Dead or Alive World Combat Championship", or simply "the Dead or Alive tournament". DOATEC (Dead or Alive Tournament Executive Committee), a massive corporation with unknown motives, holds the fighting competition in arenas ranging from the North Pole to the Amazon rainforest.

Dead or Alive, the first game in the series, introduces the initial characters and their reasons for entering the tournament. For example, Zack enters for profit, while Kasumi, a runaway female ninja of the Mugen Tenshin Ninja Clan and the series' main protagonist, enters the tournament to seek revenge against Raidou, who injured her brother, Hayate. Kasumi wins the first DOA tournament and kills Raidou; however, due to her status as a runaway, the strict laws of the ninja society prevents Kasumi from returning to her village and she becomes a hunted fugitive.

Dead or Alive 2 is set less than a year later, as Tengu escapes from his world and threatens the human world. Fame Douglas, the founder and CEO of DOATEC, is assassinated shortly after the first tournament, causing DOATEC to fall under a new leadership. Kasumi is kidnapped by DOATEC and used as a subject in DOATEC's bio-weapon experiment, Alpha. Kasumi's brother Hayate, previously injured by Raidou, is also kidnapped and used as a subject in DOATEC's bio-weapon experiment, Epsilon. New fighters include Ein, Helena Douglas, Kasumi Alpha, Leon, and Tengu. Eventually, Ryu Hayabusa kills Tengu and wins the second tournament.

Dead or Alive 3 takes place after the defeat of Tengu. The game's plot concerns a secret goal of DOATEC scientist Victor Donovan to produce the ultimate human weapon called the "Omega Project". Through the Epsilon and Alpha stages, DOATEC captures and wipes the Mugen Tenshin's Hajin Mon ninja Genra's memory, transforming him into a monstrous being called Omega. A third tournament is later held to test Genra's Omega abilities. In the end, Kasumi's half-sister Ayane kills her former master and wins the third tournament. The game introduces five more fighters: the first playable appearance of Hayate and the brand new fighters Brad Wong, Christie, Hitomi, and Omega.

Dead or Alive 4 again explores DOATEC's attempts to create a powerful clone of Kasumi with the Alpha Project. The various fighters discover the true nature of DOATEC and set out to stop it, leading to a fiery war at DOATEC's primary headquarters. Helena takes over DOATEC as its new president and CEO, determined to fight against the corruption within the organization and change DOATEC for the better. Helena wins the fourth tournament and decides to give the title to Zack after saving her. The game introduces four new fighters: Alpha-152, Eliot, Kokoro, and La Mariposa.

The fifth game, Dead or Alive 5, is set two years later. DOATEC is newly reformed with Helena still in control and Zack appearing to be an employee. Donovan forms a new organization called MIST to continue the Alpha Project. Jann Lee beats Hitomi in the last round of the fifth tournament. However, Jann Lee still feels that there is one person who he wants to defeat in order for him to be a true winner- Rig, who at first seems to have amnesia since he refers to Donovan as his dad. Meanwhile, Kasumi, Ryu, and Ayane, with help from Helena, fight to destroy the Alpha project and stop Donovan.

Continuing to Dead or Alive 6, DOATEC and Mugen Tenshin discover that MIST is after the fifth tournament qualifier participant, Honoka, due to her having a similar power signature as Raidou. By the time the sixth tournament begins, suspicions of Rig experiencing amnesia are confirmed; he is unknowingly being implanted with a hypnotic suggestion by MIST that brainwashes him to serve them under the alias "Victor Donovan Jr.", causing Bass and Jann Lee to worry about his current situation. For the final tournament match, Jann Lee is once again officially a winner, but he was unofficially defeated by a newcomer, Diego. Ayane and Honoka are soon kidnapped by MIST and coerced into unwillingly reviving Raidou, their biological father, as an undead cyber ninja demon. As her older half-sister, Honoka, is still weakened, Ayane teams up with Kasumi and Hayate to kill the revived Raidou once and for all. Helena, arriving at one of MIST's hidden laboratories to secure the place, approaches a young scientist, NiCO, who acts as Lisa's replacement and is responsible for Raidou's resurrection. Although NiCO attempts to revive Helena's mother, Maria, Helena rejects her plan, causing NiCO to escape from her.

== History ==
Release timeline Mainline number entries in bold
1996	**Dead or Alive**
1997
1998	Dead or Alive ++
1999	**Dead or Alive 2**
2000	Dead or Alive 2 Millennium
2000	Dead or Alive 2 Hardcore
2001	**Dead or Alive 3**
2002–2003
2004	Dead or Alive Ultimate
2005	**Dead or Alive 4**
2006–2007
2008	Dead or Alive Online
2009–2010
2011	Dead or Alive: Dimensions
2012	**Dead or Alive 5**
2013	Dead or Alive 5+
2013	Dead or Alive 5 Ultimate
2014
2015	Dead or Alive 5 Last Round
2016
2017	Dead or Alive 5 Infinite
2018
2019	**Dead or Alive 6**
2020–2025
2026	Dead or Alive 6 Last Round

The series was created by its original director and producer Tomonobu Itagaki after he became a programmer for Tecmo in 1992. During the mid-1990s, Tecmo was in financial trouble and was in need of a hit to boost sagging game sales. In this vein, Itagaki made a wager with the management of company, including the vice president later turned president of the company, Junji Nakamura, assuring he would create a video game that would garner a fan base. Tomonobu Itagaki stated how he was dissatisfied with the way modern fighting games at the time were presented; he missed the old arcade-style of play and had another vision for the fighting game genre. Following the initial working titles of "Ninja Fighter" and "Poligon Fighter", he named the series "Dead or Alive" to demonstrate both the company's and game's fail or succeed status, and proceeded to form a division in the company named Team Ninja. The first Dead or Alive game released in 1996 was a success in helping Tecmo overcome their financial problems, and in turn, helped Dead or Alive become a franchise. Itagaki's inspiration for the series derived from the Virtua Fighter series in Japan as the management asked Itagaki to create a game similar to Virtua Fighter. Inspiration also derived from the Fatal Fury series in Japan, and the Mortal Kombat series in America, with DOA's sexual appeal drawn from the former series, and the ability to knock opponents off landscapes from the latter. When asked how he wished the series would contribute to the fighting genre, Itagaki replied: "I want people to remember DOA as a game that was very aggressive and combative. As to [...] how it contributed to the fighting genre – I look at it as something similar to how sushi was released in this country and became mainstream. You know, like, some people like graphics, some people like animation, some like flashy character design and so forth. Through DOA, we want to reach out to those people and become somewhat of a mainstream game."

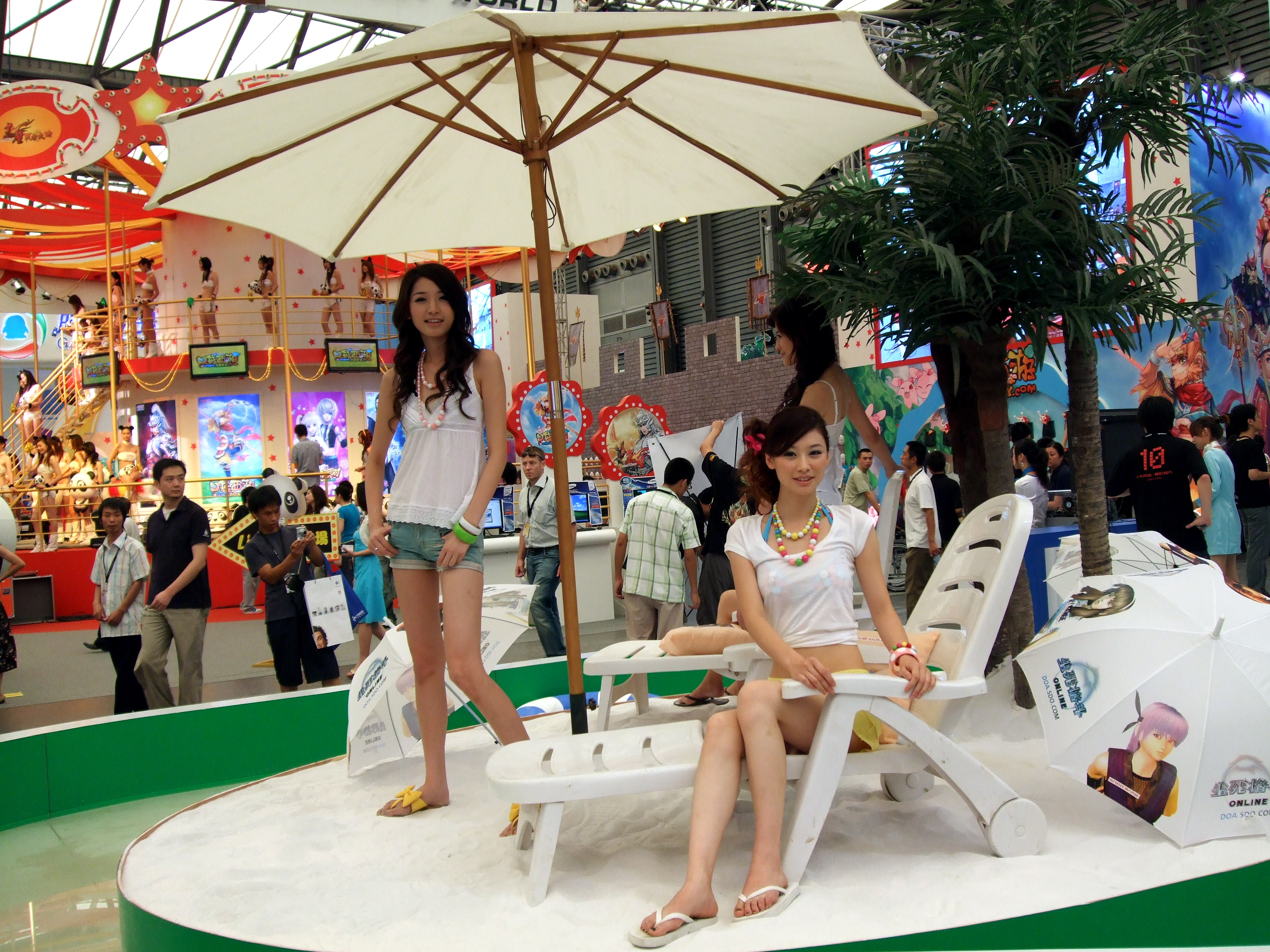
Dead or Alive Online promotion at China Digital Entertainment Expo & Conference (ChinaJoy) 2007

The sequels, Dead or Alive 2, Dead or Alive 3, and Dead or Alive 4 brought much success to the franchise, both critically and commercially. The success of Dead or Alive sparked a renewal interest in Tecmo's classic (but at that time long dormant) Ninja Gaiden series. After Ninja Gaiden was revived in 2004 by Itagaki and Team Ninja, they began linking it back with Dead or Alive, setting the franchises within the same universe with overlapping characters and events. As it was a complete reboot of the series and did not continue the canon of any previous Ninja Gaiden titles, the developers were free to do with the universe and its characters as it saw fit, and so the game was implemented into the DOA universe, setting up Ninja Gaiden I, Dragon Sword and Ninja Gaiden II as prequels to the first DOA. In addition, Ninja Gaiden protagonist Ryu Hayabusa, who had already been on the roster of every DOA fighting game since the beginning, plays a major role in that series' overarching storyline, which has been fleshed out during the development of the subsequent Ninja Gaiden titles. Having featured Ryu in most of Dead or Alive games during development of the Ninja Gaiden reboot, Team Ninja then included the characters Ayane and Kasumi in most of the Ninja Gaiden games. Conversely, several characters from DOA have roles in the rebooted Ninja Gaiden series, initially only appearing during story sequences but becoming fully playable characters in special modes in the later games. Rachel and Momiji, characters originating from the Ninja Gaiden series, appear in updated versions of Dead or Alive 5.

Before his departure from Team Ninja, Itagaki stated in 2006 that he had a new DOA game planned, but in a 2008 interview he said about the series: "This is another area that my closest colleagues and I all agree that we were able to achieve the definitive fighting game with DOA4. So we're not looking to extend the series at this point." In a released statement on June 3, 2008, Itagaki announced his resignation from Tecmo (July 1, 2008) due to business troubles with the new president of Tecmo, Yoshimi Yasuda. Itagaki filed a lawsuit against Yoshimi Yasuda for withholding a bonus promised for his previous works and for damages based on "unreasonable and disingenuous statements" made in front of Itagaki's colleagues. Other lawsuits were filed with former Tecmo president, Junji Nakamura (who retired in 2006), demanding payment in executive retirement benefits on February 14, 2007, and two plaintiffs suing on behalf of Tecmo's 300 employees for unpaid wages on June 16, 2008. Itagaki stated that this would unfortunately lead to the end of production for the game and its series. However, Tecmo replied with the announcement that Team Ninja would not be dissolved upon Itagaki's departure, stating that both the Ninja Gaiden and Dead or Alive franchises would remain in production and that some projects were already underway.

Soon after, Tecmo president, Yoshimi Yasuda, resigned from the company following the lawsuits and was replaced by Tecmo's chairman of the board, Yasuharu Kakihara. Tecmo would merge with fellow video game publisher, Koei, to form Tecmo Koei Games, now known as Koei Tecmo. The role of Team Ninja leader and series producer was taken over by Dead or Alive planner and tester, Yosuke Hayashi, while game designer and planner, Yohei Shimbori, takes over as director of the series. Dead or Alive Paradise was the first DOA console game not developed by the original Team Ninja. Dead or Alive 5 was created in partnership with Sega AM2 of Virtua Fighter fame, featuring several guest characters from that series. Free-to-play versions of the games Dead or Alive 5 and Dead or Alive 6 were released to attract new fans to the series and to introduce more people to the fighting genre, hoping to help to bring back the fighting games' golden era of the 1990s. On March 31, 2021, director Shimbori announced his departure from Team Ninja to pursue other opportunities, while his position of director was taken over by Hayashi. In 2022, Hayashi would step down as Team Ninja head to become the Koei Tecmo entertainment division's general manager, with Fumihiko Yasuda serving as Team Ninja's current head.

Between 2020 and 2025, no new games in the fighting game series were released. At the end of a presentation by Koei Tecmo at G-Star 2022, it was hinted that the franchise might be rebooted again in the near future. The rumors were subsequently disconfirmed by Team Ninja creative director, Tom Lee. In a February 2024 interview with Team Ninja department manager, Masakazu Hirayama, he stated that they are considering the possibility of returning to the series, saying that Dead or Alive is an important IP to them. When asked about introducing a guest character from Dead or Alive to Tekken 8, former producer Katsuhiro Harada cited this content drought as the main reason he did not see a collaboration happening.

On 12 February 2026, during a State of Play presentation, producer Yosuke Hayashi announced a new Dead or Alive game along with a definitive version of Dead or Alive 6 to commemorate the series' 30th anniversary.

== Themes ==
The franchise's plot explores the themes of ninjutsu, family, loyalty, revenge, destiny, betrayal, ambition, morality, sacrifice, responsibility, journey, coming of age, backstory, tradition, modernity, science, exploitation, cloning, human experimentation, advanced technology, corporate corruption, power, shifting tones, character development, corporate espionage, greed, black market, bootlegging, alcoholism, recreational drug use, illegal drug trade, terrorism and intergovernmental authority.

== Games ==
=== Main series ===
Game	Details
Dead or Alive Original release date: WW: November 26, 1996	Release years by system: 1996 – Arcade (Sega Model 2); 1997 – Sega Saturn; 1998 – PlayStation; 2008 – PlayStation Network
Dead or Alive Original release date: WW: November 26, 1996	Notes: Released on PlayStation 3 as a PS one Classic in Japan on December 10, 2008.
Dead or Alive 2 Original release dates: JP: October 16, 1999; NA: February 29, 2000; EU: April 28, 2000	Release years by system: 1999 – Arcade (Sega NAOMI); 2000 – Dreamcast, PlayStation 2
Dead or Alive 2 Original release dates: JP: October 16, 1999; NA: February 29, 2000; EU: April 28, 2000	Notes: PlayStation 2 launch title in Japan.
Dead or Alive 3 Original release dates: NA: November 15, 2001; JP: February 22, 2002; EU: March 14, 2002	Release years by system: 2001 – Xbox; 2021 – Xbox Live
Dead or Alive 3 Original release dates: NA: November 15, 2001; JP: February 22, 2002; EU: March 14, 2002	Notes: Xbox launch title.; Released on Xbox Live on November 10, 2021. The European and Japanese versions both feature more content and are downloadable from Xbox Live on American Xbox platforms by purchasing Dead or Alive 3 for $14.99 in the Xbox Store first, then changing the region in the Xbox settings to either United Kingdom or Japan, and restarting the console before downloading. The console can be switched back to the American region after the download is complete.
Dead or Alive 4 Original release dates: NA/JP: December 29, 2005; EU: January 27, 2006	Release years by system: 2005 – Xbox 360; 2021 – Xbox Live
Dead or Alive 4 Original release dates: NA/JP: December 29, 2005; EU: January 27, 2006	Notes: A demo version of the game was made available for free download on Xbox Live on July 24, 2006.; Released on Xbox Live on November 15, 2021.
Dead or Alive 5 Original release dates: NA: September 25, 2012; JP: September 27, 2012; EU: September 28, 2012	Release years by system: 2012 – PlayStation 3, Xbox 360
Dead or Alive 6 Original release date: WW: March 1, 2019	Release years by system: 2019 – PlayStation 4, Xbox One, Windows, Arcade (Sega ALLS)
Dead or Alive 6 Original release date: WW: March 1, 2019	Notes: A free-to-play version was released under the name Dead or Alive 6: Core Fighters on March 15, 2019.; An arcade version was released on July 18, 2019.; The Steam version was delisted on June 10, 2026.

=== Updated versions ===
Game	Details
Dead or Alive ++ Original release date: JP: October 16, 1998	Release years by system: 1998 – Arcade (Sony ZN-1)
Dead or Alive 2 Millennium Original release date: JP: January 18, 2000; NA/EU: 2000	Release years by system: 2000 – Arcade (Sega NAOMI)
DOA2: Hardcore Original release dates: NA: October 25, 2000; JP: December 14, 2000; EU: December 15, 2000	Release years by system: 2000 – PlayStation 2; 2012 – PlayStation Network
DOA2: Hardcore Original release dates: NA: October 25, 2000; JP: December 14, 2000; EU: December 15, 2000	Notes: PlayStation 2 launch title in North America.; Spelled DOA2: Hard*Core in Japan.; Released on PlayStation 3 as a PlayStation 2 Classic in Japan on August 22, 2012 and in North America on March 24, 2015.
Dead or Alive 5+ Original release dates: NA: March 19, 2013; EU: March 22, 2013; JP: March 20, 2013	Release years by system: 2013 – PlayStation Vita
Dead or Alive 5+ Original release dates: NA: March 19, 2013; EU: March 22, 2013; JP: March 20, 2013	Notes: A demo version of the game was made available for free download on PlayStation Network on March 19, 2013.
Dead or Alive 5 Ultimate Original release dates: NA: September 3, 2013; JP: September 5, 2013; EU: September 6, 2013	Release years by system: 2013 – PlayStation 3, Xbox 360, Arcade (Sega RingEdge 2)
Dead or Alive 5 Ultimate Original release dates: NA: September 3, 2013; JP: September 5, 2013; EU: September 6, 2013	Notes: A free-to-play version of the game was released under the name Dead or Alive 5 Ultimate: Core Fighters.; An arcade version of the game was released on December 24, 2013 as Dead or Alive 5 Ultimate: Arcade.
Dead or Alive 5 Last Round Original release dates: NA: February 17, 2015; JP: February 19, 2015; EU: February 20, 2015	Release years by system: 2015 – PlayStation 3, PlayStation 4, Xbox 360, Xbox One, Arcade (Sega RingEdge 2), Windows
Dead or Alive 5 Last Round Original release dates: NA: February 17, 2015; JP: February 19, 2015; EU: February 20, 2015	Notes: A free-to-play version of the game was released under the name Dead or Alive 5 Last Round: Core Fighters.; The PlayStation 3 and Xbox 360 versions of the game are digital-only outside of Japan.
Dead or Alive 6 Last Round Original release date: WW: June 25, 2026	Release years by system: 2026 – PlayStation 5, Xbox Series X/S, Windows
Dead or Alive 6 Last Round Original release date: WW: June 25, 2026	Notes: Announced as part of the series' 30th anniversary celebration.; A free-to-play version of the game was released under the name Dead or Alive 6 Last Round: Core Fighters.

=== Compilations ===
Game	Details
Dead or Alive Ultimate Original release dates: NA: October 26, 2004; JP: November 3, 2004; EU: February 18, 2005	Release years by system: 2004 – Xbox; 2021 – Xbox Live
Dead or Alive Ultimate Original release dates: NA: October 26, 2004; JP: November 3, 2004; EU: February 18, 2005	Notes: Compilation containing an enhanced version of Dead or Alive 1 and a remake of Dead or Alive 2.; Released on Xbox Live separately as Dead or Alive 1 Ultimate and Dead or Alive 2 Ultimate on November 10, 2021.
Dead or Alive: Dimensions Original release dates: JP: May 19, 2011; EU: May 20, 2011; NA: May 24, 2011	Release years by system: 2011 – Nintendo 3DS
Dead or Alive: Dimensions Original release dates: JP: May 19, 2011; EU: May 20, 2011; NA: May 24, 2011	Notes: Compilation game based on a modified Dead or Alive 4 engine.; A demo version of the game was made available for free download on Nintendo eShop on December 7, 2011.

=== Spin-offs ===
Game	Details
Dead or Alive Xtreme series	Release years by system: 2003 – Xbox (Dead or Alive Xtreme Beach Volleyball); 2006 – Xbox 360 (Dead or Alive Xtreme 2); 2006 – Mobile (DOA Paradise♪); 2009 – iOS (Girls of DOA BlackJack: The Kasumi Version); 2010 – PlayStation Portable (Dead or Alive Paradise); 2016 – PlayStation 4, PlayStation Vita (Dead or Alive Xtreme 3); 2017 – Windows (Dead or Alive Xtreme Venus Vacation); 2017 – Arcade (Dead or Alive Xtreme Sense); 2019 – PlayStation 4, Nintendo Switch (Dead or Alive Xtreme 3 Scarlet); 2025 – PlayStation 4, PlayStation 5, Windows (Venus Vacation Prism: Dead or Alive Xtreme)
Dead or Alive Xtreme series	Notes: Beach volleyball game series featuring the female characters from the main Dead or Alive series.; Starting with Dead or Alive Xtreme 3, the sub-series has not been released outside of Asian markets.; Starting with Dead or Alive Xtreme Venus Vacation, characters original to the sub-series started to be introduced.
Dead or Alive Online Original release date: CHN: December 2008	Release years by system: 2008 – Windows
Dead or Alive Online Original release date: CHN: December 2008	Notes: Dead or Alive Online (Chinese: 生死格鬥 Online) was a free-to-play online fighting game based on DOA2U that was originally planned to release in China for the 2008 Summer Olympics, with a worldwide release to follow after. It was released in China but can also be accessed internationally.; Players would create chibi-style avatars, interact in virtual communities and participate in one on one fighting matches or tournaments. Players would also receive invitations to compete in various types of fighting contests and the game also supported a team mode, allowing players to form teams with their friends to coordinate in fighting.; The game was in open beta since December 2008, with the latest beta having been released on August 24, 2009.; In 2010, Tecmo Koei ceased Dead or Alive Online operations and all game servers were shut down.
Slot Dead or Alive 5 Original release date: JP: August 21, 2016	Release years by system: 2016 – Slot machine
Slot Dead or Alive 5 Original release date: JP: August 21, 2016	Notes: A Dead or Alive 5-based pachislot released by Universal Entertainment in 2016.
Dead or Alive 5 Infinite Original release date: CHN: 2017	Release years by system: 2017 – Android, iOS
Dead or Alive 5 Infinite Original release date: CHN: 2017	Notes: A mobile turn-based RPG based on Dead or Alive 5 developed by Tianxi Entertainment and released exclusively for Chinese markets.
Dead or Alive M Original release date: AS: 2019	Release years by system: 2019 – Android, iOS
Dead or Alive M Original release date: AS: 2019	Notes: A mobile turn based RPG made similar to Dead or Alive 5 Infinite, released exclusively in the Asian market.; Delisted in 2021.

=== Upcoming ===
Game	Details
Dead or Alive New Project Proposed release date: WW: TBD	Proposed system release: TBD – PlayStation 5
Dead or Alive New Project Proposed release date: WW: TBD	Notes: Announced as part of the series' 30th anniversary celebration.

=== Cancelled ===
Game	Details
Dead or Alive: Code Chronos Cancellation date: November 5, 2010	Proposed system release: Xbox 360
Dead or Alive: Code Chronos Cancellation date: November 5, 2010	Notes: Dead or Alive: Code Chronos was the code name for a cancelled video game that was in development by Team Ninja for the Xbox 360 during the mid-2000s.; In a February 2005 interview, Team Ninja's Tomonobu Itagaki said that Code Chronos would be set prior to the original Dead or Alive and will relay the story of characters Ayane and Kasumi before the first tournament.; Itagaki said it would "not be a fighting game" and instead act as a prequel to the series proper, and the game was supposed to be related to the part of the opening cinematic of Dead or Alive Ultimate that showed the child versions of Kasumi and Ayane. Earlier reports had implied the character of Helena would be more heavily involved.; In 2008, Itagaki officially resigned from Tecmo, thus leaving the Dead or Alive franchise. And in November 2010, Yousuke Hayashi, the new head of Team Ninja, confirmed in an interview that the project has been officially cancelled.

== Related media ==
=== Film adaptation ===
A feature film titled DOA: Dead or Alive, directed by Corey Yuen and starring Holly Valance, Devon Aoki, Jaime Pressly, Sarah Carter, and Natassia Malthe, was released in the United States on June 15, 2007. In the film, four female fighters are invited to a martial arts contest; they begin as rivals, but work together to uncover the secret that Donovan, the organizer of the tournament, is trying to hide. Not screened in advance for the press, the film received negative reviews and was a flop at the box office.

=== Crossovers ===
Several Dead or Alive characters have made appearances and are referenced in other games.

- Ayane and Kasumi both appear as playable characters in the Ninja Gaiden games.
- Kasumi and Ayane appear as playable characters in the Monster Rancher games.
- Kasumi's signature blue outfit appears as an alternative outfit for the character, Mio Amakura, in Fatal Frame II: Crimson Butterfly.
- The outfits for Kasumi, Ryu Hayabusa, and Ayane, appear as alternative costumes for the characters, Arin, Max, and Kooh, in the Super Swing Golf games.
- An armor similar to Ryu's outfit makes a cameo in Halo 3 as an unlockable armor set called Hayabusa.
- Ryu, Ayane, and Kasumi make guest appearances in the PlayStation 3 version of Dynasty Warriors: Strikeforce where Ryu and Ayane are NPCs that offers three different quests to the player.
- Kasumi appears as a playable character in Queen's Blade: Spiral Chaos.
- Ryu's and Ayane's costume parts were available as exclusive DLC during the first anniversary promotion campaign for Dynasty Warriors Online.
- Ryu, Kasumi, and Ayane are playable characters in Warriors Orochi 3. They appear in another dimension where they assist the other warriors.
- Ayane appears as a playable character in Fatal Frame: Maiden of Black Water during the post-endgame story.
- Ryu and Ayane appear as playable characters in the Japan-only Dynasty Warriors Vs. (previously known as Dynasty Warriors 3DS).
- Kasumi, Ryu, Ayane, Honoka, and Marie Rose appear in Warriors All-Stars, whereas Kasumi, Honoka, and Marie represent Dead or Alive characters while Ryu and Ayane represent Ninja Gaiden characters.
- Ryu appears as a playable character in Warriors Orochi 4 Ultimate.
- The presumable ancestors of Ryu Hayabusa respectively, Jin and Ren Hayabusa, including the ancient variant of Nyotengu, appear in Nioh 2 as secret bosses. Ryu Hayabusa later appears in a patch for the game.
- The outfits, hairstyles, and accessories for Kasumi, Ryu, and Ayane were used in Phantasy Star Online 2.
- Ayane, Marie, Honoka, Kasumi, and Tamaki appear in the Senran Kagura games.
- Kasumi, Marie Rose, Nyotengu, and Honoka appear in The King of Fighters All Star.

=== Other media ===
Several games have made appearances and have been mentioned in other media. In the 2002 film Run Ronnie Run, the character, Jerry Trellis, is shown playing Dead or Alive 2 as Kasumi in two different scenes and as Gen Fu in one scene. Jerry uses some of Kasumi's moves in a real fight. Dead or Alive 2 is also seen briefly in the 2002 film One Hour Photo, where the son, Jake Yorkin, is playing the game in his bedroom. Dead or Alive 3 appears in the television series Buffy the Vampire Slayer. In the 11th episode of the 6th season entitled "Gone" from 2002, two of the Trio members, Andrew Wells and Jonathan Levinson, play Dead or Alive 3 at the arcade. On December 24, 2005, Dead or Alive 4 was briefly referenced in one of the comic strips for The Boondocks, as an Xbox 360 game that the character, Riley, was supposed to get for Christmas, but his threats to Santa, who was actually Riley's grandpa, resulted in his grandpa getting the game instead. Dead or Alive has been featured numerous times in the Guinness World Records.

In October 2007, a fan-made web series of CG action movies called Dead Fantasy was created by late web-based animator and writer, Monty Oum. Dead Fantasy featured Dead or Alive characters, Kasumi, Ryu Hayabusa, Ayane, Helena Douglas, Hayate, Hitomi, along with Ninja Gaiden characters, Rachel and Momiji, competing against a number of characters from the Final Fantasy and Kingdom Hearts RPG franchises. The web series feature numerous battle royale-style brawls as the two sides fight against each other in a number of different environments. As well as the multiple references to the namesake series, there are also salutes to other games, films, and media of the fighting genre, plus some examples of fan-made weaponry and costumes. Dead Fantasy was well received by fans of all four-game series, and gained success on and off the internet, with trailers, previews and the instalments themselves being featured at several gaming conventions.

== Reception and legacy ==
Aggregate review scores As of June 29, 2026.
Game	GameRankings	Metacritic	OpenCritic
Dead or Alive	(PS) 83.92% (SS) 82.00%	(PS) 84/100	–
Dead or Alive 2	(DC) 91.37% (PS2) 87.38%	(PS2) 91/100	–
Dead or Alive 3	86.19%	87/100	–
Dead or Alive Ultimate	84.14%	83/100	–
Dead or Alive 4	85.49%	85/100	–
Dead or Alive: Dimensions	82.02%	79/100	–
Dead or Alive 5 Dead or Alive 5 Plus Dead or Alive 5 Ultimate Dead or Alive 5 Last Round	(Vita) 84.50% (X360) 79.45% (PS4) 75.19% (PS3) 74.57% (XONE) 72.40% (PC) 60.50%	(Vita) 80/100 (X360) 76/100 (PS3) 74/100 (PS4) 74/100 (XONE) 69/100 (PC) 69/100	36% recommend
Dead or Alive 6 Dead or Alive 6 Last Round	(XONE) 80.00% (PC) 75.00% (PS4) 72.13%	(XONE) 76/100 (PC) 73/100 (PS4) 72/100 (PS5) 69/100 (XSX) 66/100 (PC) 63/100 ^{(LR)}	55% recommend 35% recommend ^{(LR)}

The Dead or Alive games have been mostly well received. The fighting series have received positive reviews, with Dead or Alive 2 having the highest ratings out of the numbered games, and Dead or Alive 5 having the lowest except its Plus version for the Vita. Dead or Alive is considered one of the greatest fighting game franchises of all time. The franchise has received numerous awards and many nominations. Several games in the series have been considered as some of the best fighting games of all time and some of the best video games of all time. (Note: Attributed to multiple references:)

The gameplay of the series was well praised for being fast-paced, fluid, aggressive, brutal, and strategic. Its Triangle system was notable for being innovative and unique to the fighting game genre, and it was the first video game series and first fighting game series with a multi-point counter system. Dead or Alive 2 was a turning point for the series, since it offered many new features and was notable for improving and popularizing the concept of multi-tiered environments. Dead or Alive 3 was notable for improving and expanding on what the previous games offered, it was a "killer app" notable for being one of the essential games in helping build the Xbox brand, it was the first fighting game for the said platform, the first fighting game to receive an award from the National Academy of Video Game Trade Reviewers (NAVGTR) during its year of inception, and the first fighting game to be included in the Xbox Championship tournaments. With Dead or Alive Ultimate, Dead or Alive was among the first fighting game series and the first Japanese fighting game series to offer online multiplayer, and was the first fighting game series to be included in the World Cyber Games (WCG). Dead or Alive 4 was the only fighting game to be included in the Championship Gaming Series (CGS), and its inclusion in the esport league in 2007 made Dead or Alive's competitive scene the first competitive fighting game scene in esports to be televised. The Dead or Alive games' environmentally driven and stage transitioning playstyle offered more dynamic combat options, creating a more interactive and engaging gameplay experience. The games' environments were widely praised for their elements, large designs and graphical details. They've influenced other fighting games, leading to a more detailed, diverse and dynamic approach to stage design.

Other developers and critics have expressed opinions on the series. Sega developer Katagiri, gave praise to the series, stating that "the uniqueness of the defense and offense mechanics and the original elements of things like the danger zone were enjoyable and gave me an overall image that it was 'a series that has evolved in its own way". Namco on the other hand, ran radio commercial ads insulting the series, prompting creator Tomonobu Itagaki to place Namco's Tekken on his dislike list. Chance Asue of Gaming Illustrated expressed love for the series, stating, "This game, more than any other fighter, feels fun and exciting without having to invest my entire life into analysing it". Asue called Dead or Alive a perfect balance between accessibility and depth, and called the fighting system a beautiful system that you won't find in another game. GameRevolution included it in their Top 10 Fighting Game Franchises of All Time. Jeb Haught of GameRevolution always loved the series and its interactive environments, smashing opponents into environmental hazards for extra damage. Screen Rant included it on their 10 Toughest Fighting Games To Master and Dunia Games ranked it 4th toughest fighting game in their 10 Toughest Fighting Game Franchises of All Time, as both stated how its simple fighting system with a few amount of buttons makes it easy to get into the gameplay, but its additional features such as fast combos, efficient attacks and counter system makes Dead or Alive a fighting game difficult to master. Link Cable Gaming.com ranked the franchise in 10th place in their Top 10: Fighting Game Franchises. Gaming.net placed it in 7th place in their 7 Best Fighting Game Franchises of All Time. Play Legit.net included the franchise in their Best Fighting Game Franchises and Stuff.tv included it in 10 of the best fighting games ever.

By July 2013, the DOA series was reported to have shipped over 8.6 million units worldwide, with that number, as of 2016, increasing to over 9.7 million units, and 10.76 million units by July 2023. As of April 2026, the series has shipped over 11 million units worldwide, with Dead or Alive 3 as the best-selling title with over 2 million units sold worldwide. As of 2026, the series sales and free-to-play downloads combined totaled over 31 million units.

The Dead or Alive series has also been a subject of controversy over the years, much like other fighting games and games of other genres. While the Dead or Alive characters have often been praised, particularly the female characters being labeled among the sexiest women in video games, the use of sex appeal to attract attention is viewed by some as controversial. The series developer, Team Ninja, has also been accused of objectifying women with their provocative style. The Dead or Alive Xtreme Beach Volleyball spin-off was also a subject of controversy where many critics have commented that the game's shameless use of female bodies is often ridiculous at best, and some have found it downright offensive. In a 2012 Interview with Kotaku, Yosuke Hayashi said that Team Ninja was "very misinterpreted" outside of Japan, and that there's no derogatory intention in their creation process: "We can't help if other cultures in other countries around the globe think that it's a bad representation". The decision to not release anymore Xtreme spin-off sequels after Dead or Alive Paradise outside Asia was due to the Xtreme spin-off games being more popular in Japan compared to Europe and North America being more niche, and the Xtreme games' diminishing sales over time.

The Dead or Alive fanbase consist of several community sites and online groups. Between 2015 and 2019, Team Ninja held annual Dead or Alive Festival events where fans could compete in fighting game tournaments, along with cosplay, photo and illustration contests, and could either win or purchase merchandise of the series. (Note: Attributed to multiple references:) Team Ninja would also hold costume design contests where various fan-made costume illustrations for specific characters were submitted to the producers and the winners would have their costume designs featured in the games. Several fans and players of the series, Emmanuel Rodriguez (Master), Kat Gunn (Mystik), Vanessa Arteaga (Vanessa), and Adande Thorne (sWooZie), most of whom have competed in the Evolution Championship Series (Evo), World Cyber Games (WCG), and Championship Gaming Series (CGS) esport leagues, have credited Dead or Alive for launching their careers in the gaming industry.
