= 2008 Championship Gaming Series season =

In 2008, the Championship Gaming Series began its second season as a worldwide sports league for professional video gamers. A total of 18 teams representing cities in seven countries played in the league. The games supported included Counter-Strike: Source, Dead or Alive 4, FIFA 08, and Forza Motorsport 2.

Once again, the CGS was broadcast throughout the world on DirecTV in the United States and Latin America, British Sky Broadcasting in the United Kingdom and Europe, and STAR TV in Asia. The World Final was to be shown live on DirecTV and rebroadcast on G4.

The Birmingham Salvo were the 2008 World Champions after defeating the San Francisco Optx by 22 points to 15, in the final on July 28, 2008.

== Regional results ==
=== North America (Region 1) ===
The season in North America began on June 2, with the first televised game on DirecTV airing on June 16. The top four teams advanced to the playoffs: Carolina Core, Dallas Venom, New York 3D, and San Francisco Optx. The Chicago Chimera, winners of both World and North America titles in 2007, did not qualify for the '08 playoffs. The Los Angeles Complexity were also eliminated.

Semifinal results (July 2):

- Carolina Core 26, New York 3D 13
- Dallas Venom 24, San Francisco Optx 22

Final result (July 7):

- Carolina Core 21, Dallas Venom 20

Both Dallas and Carolina qualified automatically for the World Final.

=== Latin America (Region 2) ===
The Mexico City Furia defeated the Rio Sinistro, 22–16, on July 10 to gain the automatic qualifying spot for the World Final from this region.

=== United Kingdom/Europe (Regions 3 and 4) ===
The Birmingham Salvo beat the Berlin Allianz, 24–22, on June 28 for the championship trophy. However, both teams earned spots into the World Final.

=== Pan-Asia (Regions 5 and 6) ===
The Sydney Underground topped the Wuhan Dragon, 22–18, in the final game on July 10. Both teams were invited to the World Final.

== Wild Card playoffs ==
The remaining spot in the eight-team World Final (reduced from 12 in 2007) was decided in a three-team playoff among the Optx, the 3D, and the London Mint. The Optx defeated the 3D, 23–17, and then the Mint 25–21. Both games were played on July 3.

== Age Disqualifactions ==
Since Berlin Allianz had to replace the young talent 'reNzo', the roster shook a bit. Since the 14-year old could not fly to the venue where the tournament would be held, a replacement had to be found. Many players responded to this announcement with a slight relieve. Some even stating it would increase their win chances if Berlin Allianz showed up without 'reNzo', or as some called him 'the wonderkid'. Even 'wez', from Birmingham Salvo, called him 'super hands'.

== World Final ==
The World Final tournament began on July 14. All matches were held at the Barker Hangar at Santa Monica Airport in southern California.

=== Quarterfinals ===
July 14:

- Berlin Allianz 26, Sydney Underground 14
- San Francisco Optx 23, Dallas Venom 19

July 16:

- Birmingham Salvo 22, Mexico City Furia 19
- Carolina Core 29, Wuhan Dragon 12

=== Semifinals ===
(both July 21)

- San Francisco Optx 27, Berlin Allianz 14
- Birmingham Salvo 21, Carolina Core 20

NOTES: The Salvo won the second semifinal in overtime when Messy defeated Offbeat Ninja in DOA 4 Male. This match was held on July 21, but not shown on DirecTV until July 23.

=== Championship ===
July 28:

- Birmingham Salvo 22, San Francisco Optx 15

NOTE: The match was halted after four of nine rounds of the second half of CounterStrike: Source, as the Salvo had clinched the championship at that point. The most valuable players were Daveyskills and Picaso, the Forza Motorsports drivers for the Salvo.

== Individual finals ==
In addition to the team competition, the top players at each game competed for cash prizes. All events were held on July 12. The list of winners follows:

- Dead or Alive 4 (female competitors): Vanessa "Vanessa" Arteaga, San Francisco Optx
- FIFA 08: Yfran "Eafra" Garcia, Chicago Chimera
- Counter-Strike: Source: Dallas Venom team
- DOA 4 (male competitors): Emanuel "Master" Rodriguez, Dallas Venom
- Forza Motorsport 2: "FinPro" and "YggdrasiL," Berlin Allianz

== World of Warcraft ==
The CGS also organized a tournament for World of Warcraft players. Nihilum Arena won the 2008 tournament final on July 19, the event was webcast live on the CGS website.
