= Ron Kim =

Ron Kim may refer to:

- Ron Kim (politician) (born 1979), American politician, member of the New York State Assembly
- Ronald Kim (born 1983), or Rambo, American Counter-Strike player
