= Ksharp =

American professional esports player

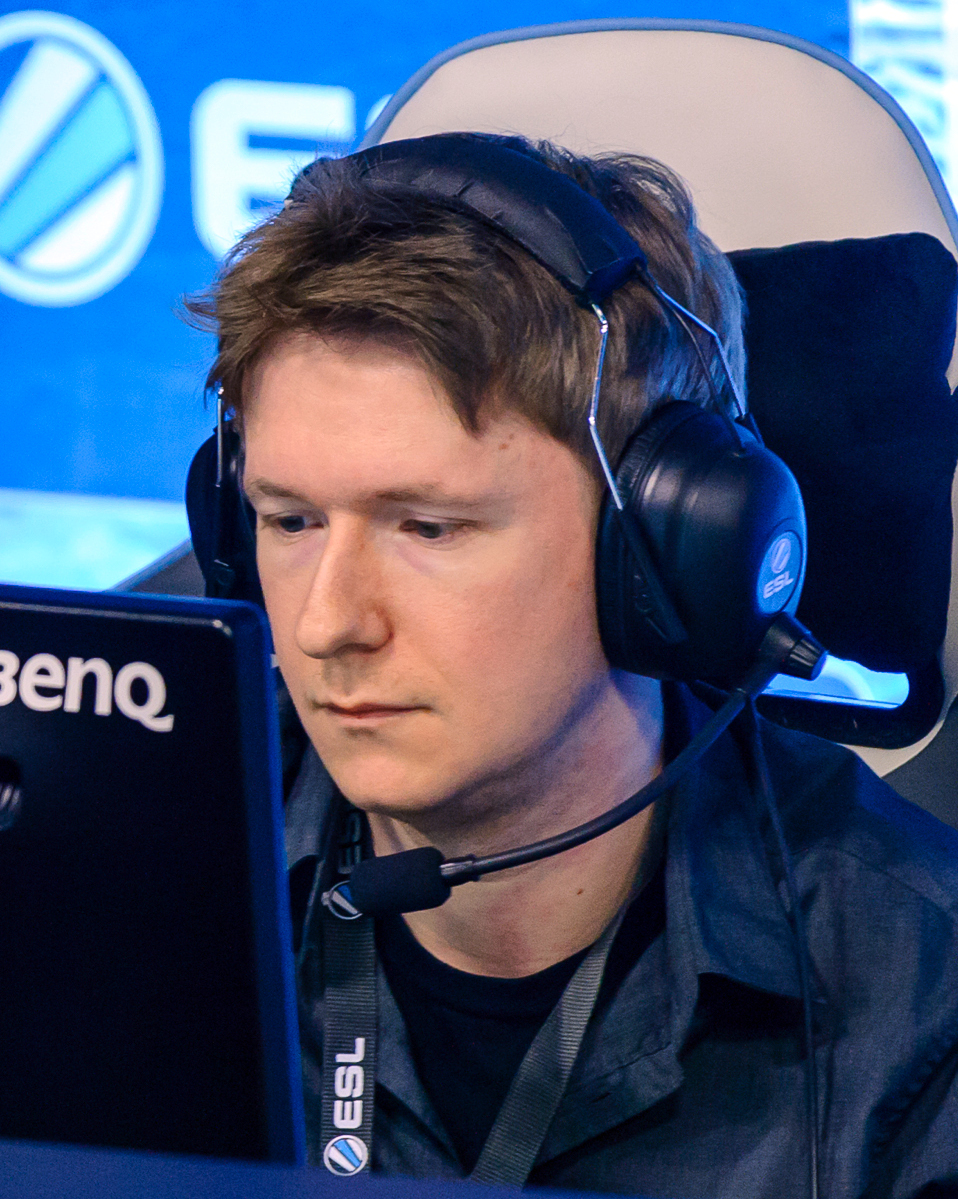
- Miller in 2015

Personal information
- Name: Kyle Miller
- Born: August 21, 1984 (age 42)
- Nationality: American

Career information
- Games: Counter-Strike 1.6; Counter-Strike Source; Counter-Strike: Global Offensive
- Playing career: 2001–2008
- Role: AWPer

Team history
- 2001–2002: X3
- 2002–2007: Team 3D
- 2007–2008: New York 3D

Kyle Miller (born August 21, 1984), better known as Ksharp, is a retired esports player who played Counter-Strike 1.6, Counter-Strike Source, and Counter-Strike: Global Offensive. At the peak of Miller's career he played for Team 3D.

== Career ==
=== X3 ===
Miller began his Counter-Strike career in earnest with team X3 in 2001. He placed in second with X3 at Winter Cyberathlete Professional League (CPL) in 2001, falling to Ninjas in Pyjamas in the finals.

=== Team 3D ===
In 2002 Miller, along with teammates Ronald "Rambo" Kim and Sean "Bullseye" Morgan, left X3 and were required by Craig Levine to form Team 3D. On Team 3D, he won Winter CPL 2002. In 2004, they won the World Cyber Games (WCG) in San Francisco, and successfully defended the title in 2005. That same year, Miller won his third major championship. Near the end of March 2006, Miller became an inactive member of Team 3D but remained a part of the team. Miller continued working with ESEA of the ESEA League and Team 3D, and, in January 2007 he returned to Team 3D. Team 3D then moved to Counter-Strike Source (CSS) to compete in DirecTV's Championship Gaming Series (CGS), with a roster of Kyle 'Ksharp' Miller, Jon "Juan" Mumm and Nick "nicKn0iT" Nowakowski (both from Team Pandemic), Mikey 'method' So, Sal 'Volcano' Garozzo, manager and coach Dave 'Moto' Geffon. With the folding of the CGS, it threw all the players into limbo, as the future of the competitive CSS scene seemed uncertain. On December 26, 2008 Jax Money Crew announced the signing of longtime 3D.NY Garozzo and So. In 2008, Miller retired from top-level competition.

== Personal life ==
Miller was born on August 21, 1984. Ksharp lived in Reston, Virginia prior to becoming a professional. After high school he decided to attend Northern Virginia Community College instead of the University of Tennessee so he could stay home and play Counter-Strike professionally. He eventually dropped out of college because his classes conflicted with his tournament schedule. His success allowed him to defer attending college while earning a living as a gamer. He currently works at ESEA.
