= Adande Thorne =

American-Trinidadian YouTuber (born 1980)

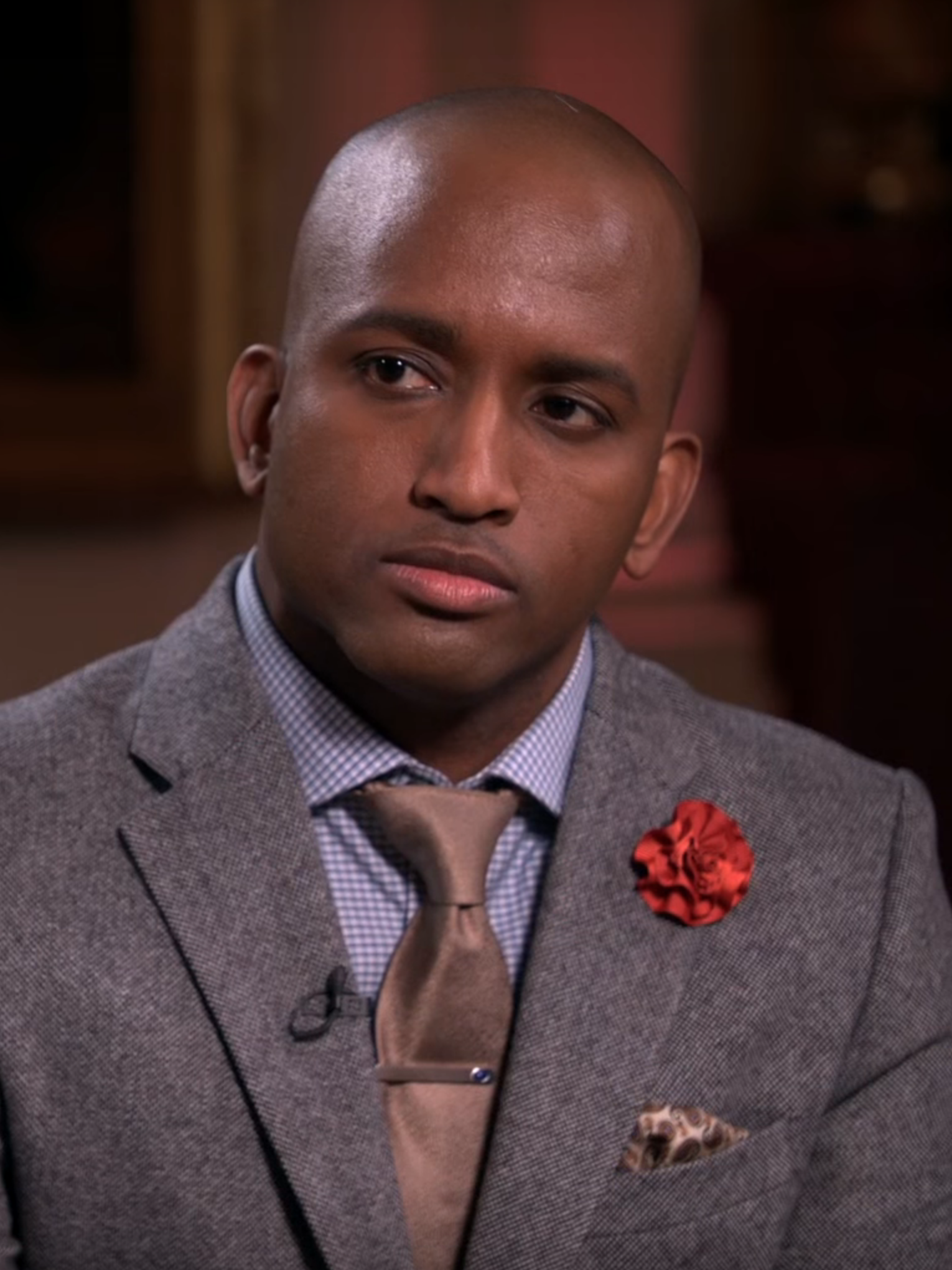
- Thorne at the White House in 2016
- Born: July 10, 1980 (age 46); Diego Martin, Trinidad and Tobago
- Other name: sWooZie
- Occupations: YouTuber; animator; comedian; actor

YouTube information
- Channel: sWooZie
- Subscribers: 7.57 million
- Views: 1.21 billion
- Last updated: November 10, 2026

Adande Thorne (born July 10, 1980), better known by his YouTube username Swoozie (stylized as sWooZie), is a Trinidadian-American YouTube personality, content creator, comedian, and actor. As of November 2026, his YouTube channel has over 1.2 billion views. In 2015, he signed with the Creative Artists Agency. In January 2016, he was one of three people who interviewed President Barack Obama during a YouTube livestream.

As a professional gamer, Thorne competed in Dead or Alive 4 for the Los Angeles Complexity in the Championship Gaming Series and the reality series WCG Ultimate Gamer.

== Early life ==
Thorne was born in Trinidad and raised in Diego Martin, Trinidad. His parents both attended Pace University. Two years after Thorne was born, his parents had a second child: his younger sister Deka. He and his family later moved to the United States. During middle school, Thorne attended a religious private school. Thorne transferred back to the public school system in the 10th grade, where he attended West Orange High School in Winter Garden, Florida, where he grew up. During this time, his friends called him "Swoosh" because of his preference for Nike clothing, whose logo was the Swoosh. This nickname later morphed into "Swoozie".

During high school, Thorne was employed at Disney's Hollywood Studios in order to support his gaming hobby.

Thorne applied to Ringling College of Art and Design (RCAD) and California Institute of the Arts because of his interest in animation but was rejected from both.

== Career ==
Thorne's interview with President Obama

=== Gaming ===
After Thorne worked at Disney, he was a lifeguard at Hard Rock Hotel. During this time, he became very successful at the video game Dead or Alive 3 and garnered an online reputation.

Because of his notoriety, Thorne was asked to compete in the Championship Gaming Series (CGS) by DirecTV. He was later drafted by the Los Angeles Complexity team and played for one season but remained on the show as an on-camera personality for season two. His work on the CGS got him work shoutcasting for various events and later got him cast in WCG Ultimate Gamer.

=== YouTube ===
Thorne began uploading vlogs onto YouTube to keep his friend and co-workers updated about his travels while he was competing in CGS. Later, he and YouTuber Michelle Phan did a collaborative video, which propelled his subscriber count. They had become acquainted through a mutual acquaintance at RCAD, where Phan was attending. Because of this growth, YouTube sent Thorne a $1600 gift-card to purchase camera equipment.

Thorne ran the gaming YouTube channel "Press Start" with Phan, last active in December 2011 as of December 2020.

In 2017, Thorne hosted the shoe design competition web series, Lace Up: The Ultimate Sneaker Challenge, on YouTube Red.

As of November 2026, his YouTube channel sWooZie which he started on February 8, 2006, has over 1.21 billion views and 7.5 million subscribers.

In November 2026, Thorne uploaded a video titled Fast and Curious 4, which received significant backlash due to his use of generative AI in the video. He defended his AI use, claiming it would help him hire more animators.

=== Acting ===
Thorne had a minor role in the film The Space Between Us (2017).

== Personal life ==
Thorne's grandmother is Chinese Trinidadian and Tobagonian.

Thorne is a Christian.

== Awards and nominations ==
Year	Nominated	Award	Result
2016	Streamy Awards	Animated	Won
