= Kat Gunn =

American esports player, cosplayer and TV personality (born 1988)

Mystik
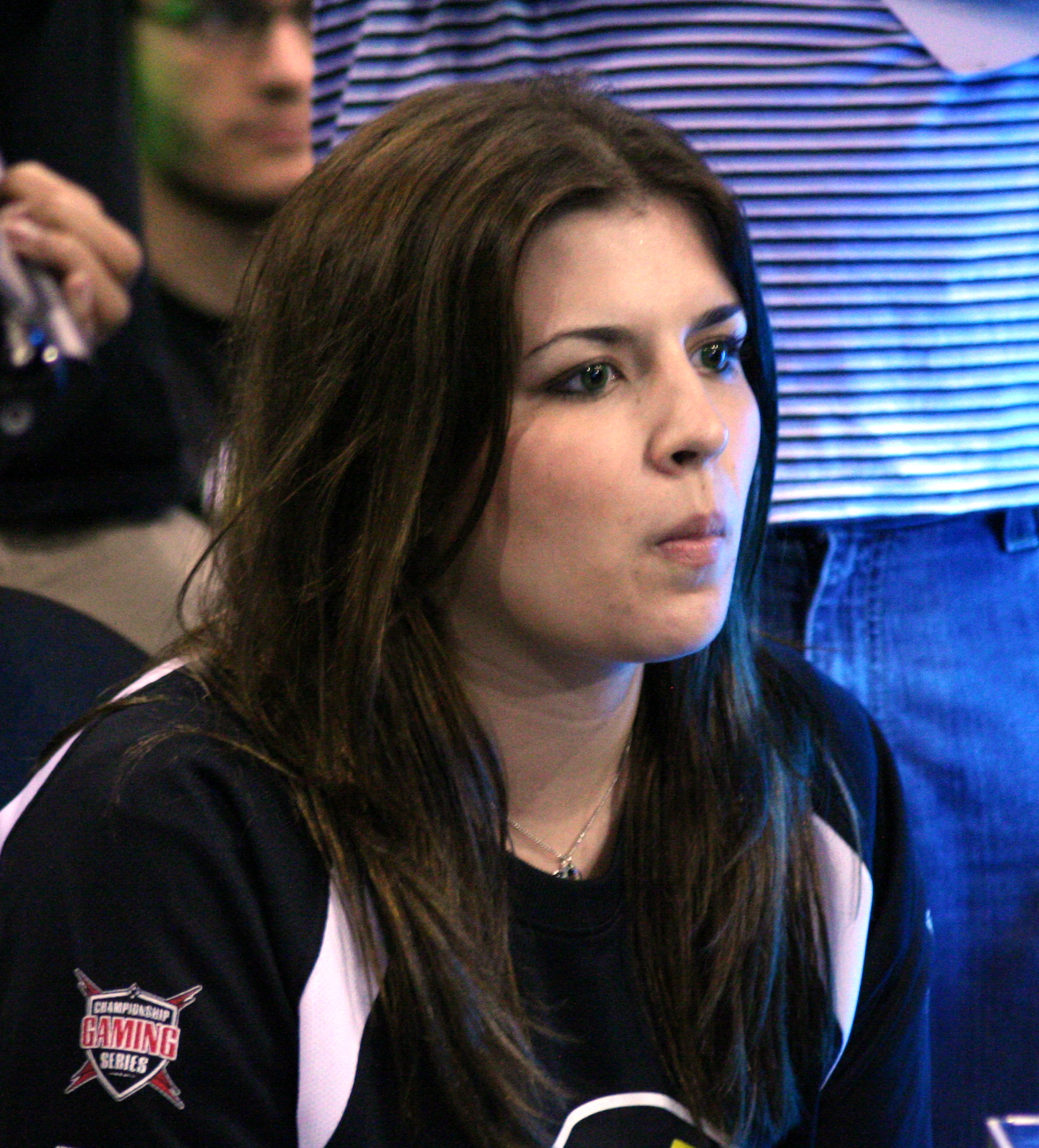
- Gunn in 2007

Personal information
- Name: Katherine Gunn
- Nickname: Kat
- Born: April 20, 1988 (age 38); Van Nuys, California, U.S.

Career information
- Games: Dead or Alive; Hearthstone; H1Z1: Just Survive; Halo; Super Puzzle Fighter II Turbo

Katherine Gunn (born April 20, 1988), also known by her online alias Mystik, is an American esports player, cosplayer and television personality. She won the second season of WCG Ultimate Gamer in 2010 and also competed in the Championship Gaming Series.

Gunn is featured in the Guinness World Records 2016 Gamer's Edition for being the highest-earning female gamer. The book states Gunn has earned $122,000 since 2007. However, when her earnings from the 2007 and 2008 seasons of the Championship Gaming Series are factored into her income, Gunn's earnings jump to over $160,000 since 2007, as her salary alone was a minimum of $30,000 per year during the CGS.

== Early life ==
Gunn was born on April 20, 1988, in Van Nuys, California.

== Career ==
Gunn was part of the female gaming clan PMS Clan, but it didn't last long due to creative differences. Gunn attended the World Cyber Games 2006 National Finals in Las Vegas, Nevada. Gunn took the opportunity to network with the WCG executives and work her way into the competitive Dead or Alive scene. The following year Gunn attended the inaugural Championship Gaming Series Region 1 Combine in Los Angeles, California. Shortly after, she was drafted in the third round of the 2007 Championship Gaming Series draft by the Carolina Core as the 18th selection, competing in Dead or Alive 4. Her team would go on to take second place at the World Finals, losing only to the Chicago Chimera.

Gunn stayed with the Carolina Core for a second season. The team lost to the Birmingham Salvo in the semi-final round of the World Finals.

In 2010, Gunn auditioned for the second and final season of the WCG Ultimate Gamer reality television show. She was targeted early by the other contestants due to her abnormally high gamer score. She won the season and $100,000, becoming the final winner of the show as it was not renewed for a third season.

She made an appearance at the fourth IGN Pro League (IPL) tournament in Las Vegas and made a few contacts, which led to an opportunity to commentate on the initial round of the "I'm a Fighter" World Championship at the 2012 Electronic Entertainment Expo. While most enjoyed Gunn's commentary, she was not pleased with her overall knowledge of the unreleased Dead or Alive 5 and began studying the game. Gunn is featured in the credits of Dead or Alive 5 because of her IPL contributions. She continued to work for the IPL until IGN closed down the league in April 2013.

Gunn also created the professional gaming and cosplay team, Less Than 3 (LT3). The team was sponsored by Mad Catz and featured notable cosplayers such as Jessica Nigri and Linda Le. While the team was sponsored by Mad Catz, they also attended Anime Expo, PAX Prime and many other events for Sentai Filmworks.

At present Gunn streams almost daily on Twitch. She frequently streams with her sister or father. In addition, Gunn continues to travel to events, such as BlizzCon, as a brand ambassador for Gigabyte, Newegg and other companies.

On October 16, 2015, Gunn began hosting GamerChix, Newegg's weekly YouTube show, with her co-host, Hailey Bright. The show is produced by Tom "Tsquared" Taylor of G4 fame and airs every Friday. She is also featured on a weekly Newegg live stream known as Game with Newegg.

== Filmography ==
=== Television ===
Year	Title	Network	Refs.
2007–2008	Championship Gaming Series	DirecTV	
2010	WCG Ultimate Gamer	Syfy	

== See also ==
- List of cosplayers
