= Linda Le =

American cosplayer (born 1982)

Linda Le (Vampy)
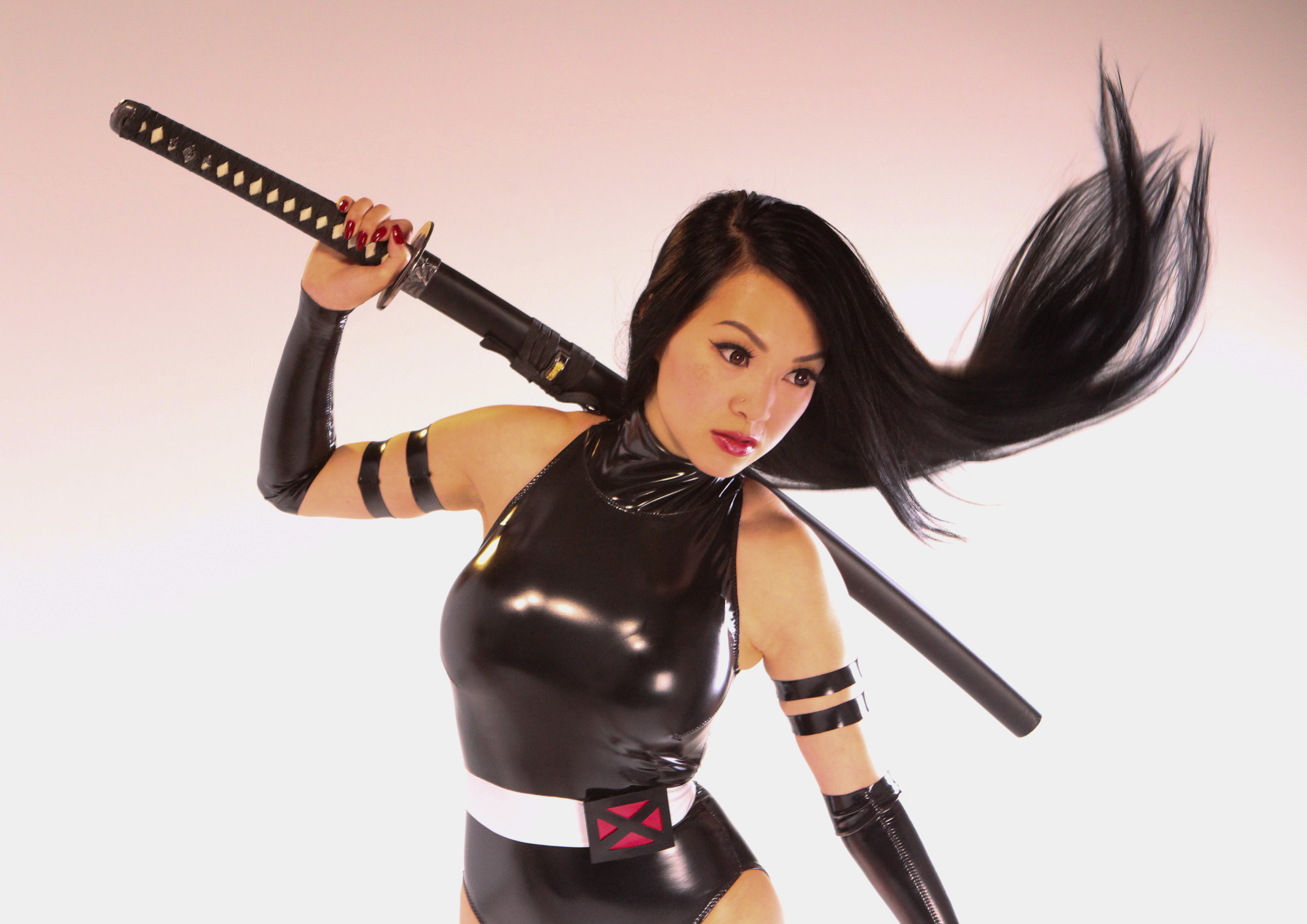
- Linda Le dressed as Psylocke in 2013
- Born: December 15, 1982 (age 43); Okmulgee, Oklahoma, U.S.
- Education: San Jose State University
- Partner: Jesse Yu
- Modeling information
- Height: 5 ft 2 in (157 cm)
- Hair color: Black
- Eye color: Brown

Linda Le (born December 15, 1982) is an American cosplayer, costumer, model, artist, and Internet personality of Vietnamese descent. She is also known as Vampy Bit Me, or just Vampy or Vamp; "Vampy" is also a name she has given to her own fictional character persona.

As a model and cosplayer, Le has been featured in several mainstream magazines including FHM Singapore and Playboy. She is a prominent spokesperson, brand ambassador, and event host for multiple Japanese and American companies, with partnerships including Bandai, Capcom, DC Comics, Kotobukiya, and Udon Entertainment.

== Biography ==
=== Early life ===
Born in Okmulgee, Oklahoma to a family of Vietnamese immigrants, Le moved to and grew up in San Jose, California where she graduated with a business degree from San Jose State University while doing various odd jobs. She later studied hairstyling from Paul Mitchell's in the U.S., Toni & Guy in London, as well as in Tokyo, before returning to America where she began teaching makeup and modeling. She has been dressing up as classic anime and video game characters since she was 12.

=== Career ===
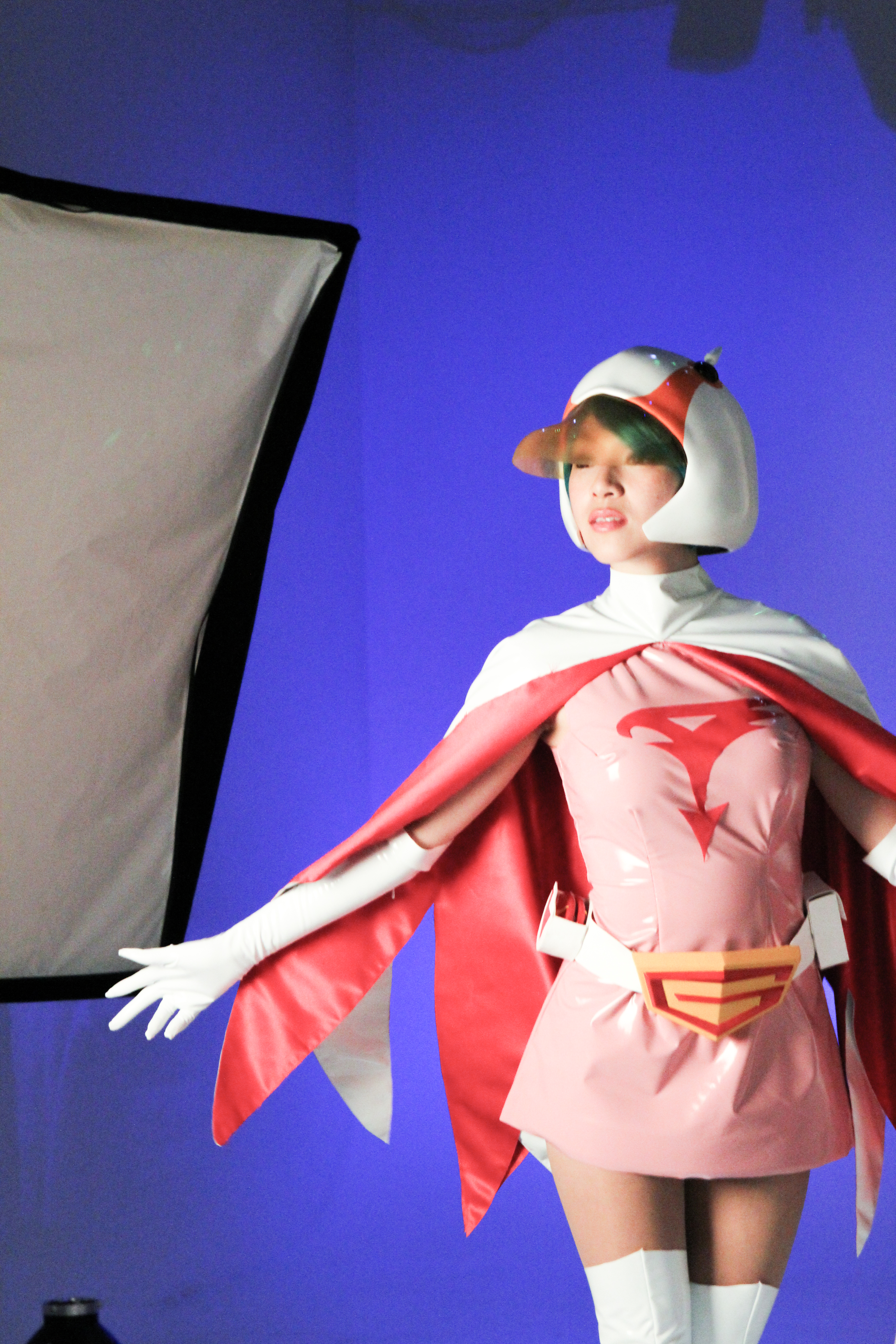
Linda Le posing as Jun from Gatchaman in 2013

Le's early fame came after some of her cosplays were featured in the showcase book Otacool 2 by Japanese toy and collectible company Kotobukiya. Le then collaborated with Street Fighter artist Long Vo to create artwork and a comic for Udon Entertainment's book Vent, as well as with Sideshow Collectibles' sculptor Tim Miller, theCHIVE, Gibson Guitar Corporation, KusoVinyl, Myx TV, Manga Entertainment UK and Bang Zoom! Entertainment, Jessica Chobot, and other artists and companies in the USA and Japan. Le was part of costume and armor prop-making group Team Mantium Designs, later renamed Mantium Industries, and a video gamer sponsored by Mad Catz.

Le wrote a column for YouBentMyWookie and in 2012 she joined Nerdist Industries to produce Just Cos, an Internet show about the world of cosplay, co-hosted by Chloe Dykstra. Le was a member of Kat Gunn's professional gaming and cosplay team, Less Than 3 (LT3), which was also sponsored by Mad Catz. In 2013, FHM Singapore featured Le in the December issue, including on the cover.

Among her popular cosplay performances are Psylocke from X-Men, and Morrigan Aensland from Darkstalkers. In 2013 interviews, Le said she works "almost 15 hour days" and sleeps a maximum of 4 hours. From 2008 to 2013, she appeared at over 200 American fan conventions.

Amped Asia in 2010 called her "probably the #1 most universally attractive Asian girl on the planet due to her geekiness (and sexiness too)." IGN in 2011 opined "her cosplay skill is off the charts." According to Kotaku in 2012, "Linda is a cosplay machine, renowned not just for the quality of her costumes, but their variety as well;" Kotaku has also previously described her as "incredibly attractive" and her works as "amazing". Asked in 2013 as where she sees herself in 20 years from now, Le answered: "Cosplay is great, but I can't be doing it forever ... Hopefully, I'll have my own costume line, come up with toys and do something related to the arts scene."

in 2024, Le hosted the Monster Hunter 20th Anniversary Creator Spotlight at TwitchCon San Diego.
