= Vanessa Arteaga =

American professional esports player

Vanessa
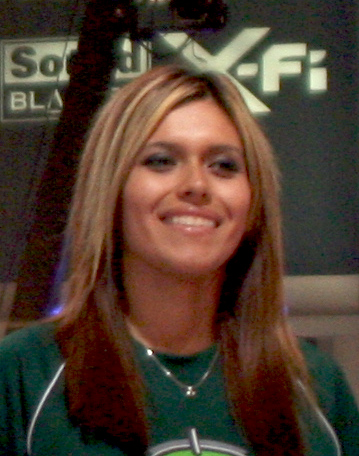
- Arteaga in 2008

Personal information
- Name: Vanessa Arteaga
- Born: 1987 or 1988 (age 37–38); California, U.S.
- Nationality: American

Career information
- Games: Dead or Alive 4

Team history
- 2007–2008: San Francisco Optx

Vanessa Arteaga, also known as just Vanessa, is a former professional video game player who plays fighting games. She is from California. Arteaga was the first pick in the draft of the Championship Gaming Series video game league list of players, excelling in the area of fighting games such as Dead or Alive 4. In the 2007 Championship Gaming Series Season, Vanessa went undefeated leading San Francisco to win first place in the Dead or Alive 4 Female Individual season. In the 2008 Championship Gaming Series Season, San Francisco Optx with a team of NinjaCW and Vanessa Arteaga finished 2nd to the Birmingham Salvo.

After her time in the Championship Gaming Series, Vanessa became a member of Kat Gunn's professional gaming and cosplay team, Less Than 3 (LT3). The team was sponsored by Mad Catz.

Vanessa also appeared on the reality television gaming competition WCG Ultimate Gamer.
