= Jax Money Crew =

- Founded: 2003; 22 years ago
- Location: United States
- Manager: Alex "JaX" Conroy
- Website: www.jmcgaming.com

JaX Money Crew (JMC) was an American professional esports team that had players competing in Counter-Strike 1.6 and FIFA 07. They competed under the name Dallas Venom as a franchise of the DirecTV Championship Gaming Series in 2007 and 2008. Afterwards with the same Counter-Strike roster it reverted to the name Jax Money Crew. The manager of the team was Alex "Jax" Conroy who founded the team while living in Southport, Connecticut.

== History ==
JMC was founded in 2003 by Alex "Jax" Conroy in Southport, Connecticut. The team originally started in the CyberAthlete League Open (CAL-O) division, placing a seat in CAL-Main in the summer of 2004. The team achieved 3rd place at CPL Winter 2005. After the next year they placed 8th at CPL Winter 2006. The organization played under the name of Dallas Venom as a franchise of the DirecTV Championship Gaming Series in 2007 and 2008. The team picked up Dead or Alive 4, FIFA 08 and Forza Motorsport players to compete in CGS competitions in those events. After the folding of the CGS Alex Conroy announced that Jax Money Crew would be returning. The team returned with the same Counter-Strike roster and reverted to the name Jax Money Crew. JMC merged with compLexity Gaming after the demise of the CGS.
