= Rambo (gamer) =

American professional esports player (born 1983)

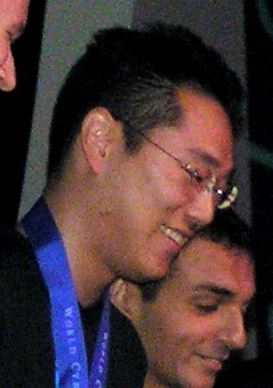
- Kim in 2005

Personal information
- Name: Ronald Kim
- Born: December 13, 1983 (age 42)
- Nationality: American

Career information
- Games: Counter-Strike
- Playing career: 1999–2010
- Coaching career: 2016–2019

Team history

As player:
- 1999: Riot Squad
- 2000: Syndicate
- 2001: Clan Killers 3
- 2002–2007: Team3D
- 2007–2008: Los Angeles Complexity

As coach:
- 2016–2017: MVP
- 2018: compLexity
- 2019: Cloud9

Ronald Kim (born December 13, 1983), known professionally as Rambo, is a former professional electronic sports player who competed in Counter-Strike for Team 3D and Los Angeles Complexity. He is a content creator and owner of FPS Coach, which offers training for first-person shooter titles.

== Career ==
=== Playing career ===
Kim began competing in Counter-Strike in 1999, when he would attend various LAN parties with his friends. He attended local LAN tournaments as a member of team Riot Squad. Riot Squad merged with rival team TRU to form the new team Syndicate in 2000. Kim next played with team Clan Killers 3; him and other members of the team broke off to form their own team named Xtreme3 in 2001. After X3's disbandment, Kim briefly played with a restarted Riot Squad team, this time led by Bobby "Sickness" Moyini. He then formed Team3D in 2002 with Kyle "Ksharp" Miller. After five years with Team3D, Kim joined team compLexity in January 2007. Complexity Gaming CompLexity rebranded to Los Angeles Complexity after becoming a franchise of the Championship Gaming Series. After the CGS' first season Kim was selected as a protected player by the franchise.

In Summer 2010, his team got 5-8th place at Arbalet Cup Dallas. Soon afterwards he retired from professional gaming.

=== Coaching career ===
On October 14, 2016, MVP announced that Kim would become the coach of MVP Project. He was a coach for compLexity in 2018; the organization did not renew his contract for 2019. In March 2019, Kim became the head coach of Cloud9's Counter-Strike: Global Offensive team. He parted ways with Cloud9 in May 2019.

== Personal life ==
Kim grew up in Dallas, Texas. He is of Korean-American descent. He was born on December 3, 1983.

== Business ventures ==
=== ESEA ===
While a member of Team 3D Kim expressed an interest in having an organized system for providing Counter-Strike lessons for the public. 3D's manager Craig Levine formed the ESEA League where Kim has been an instructor since the website's inception.

=== The Art of Counter-Strike ===
Kim is co-author of a competitive guide titled The Art of Counter-Strike (TAO-CS) along with ex-teammate Ognian "steel" Gueorguiev and journalist Duncan "Thorin" Shields. The guide, which is sold digitally as an ebook, contains over 200 pages and 50 minutes of video footage.
