= EFGaming =

- Divisions: Counter-Strike: Source
- Founded: 2005
- Folded: 2008

EFGaming was a professional gaming organization for Counter-Strike: Source, formed in December 2005 by former Check-Six (x6) / PowersGaming members. Considered by many as the top Counter-Strike: Source team in North America, they won many LAN tournaments, with most recent the "Ryu LAN Event", November 2006. In April 2008 most of EFGaming went to the San Francisco Optx of the Championship Gaming Series. The team was named after the daughter of one of the team's managers. Matthew "Erd" Grover wrote a letter of resignation on their website in 2008, stating that they were not planning to continue EFGaming activities under that name.

== EFGaming's Roster ==
- Moe "mOE" Assad
- Josh "dominator" Sievers (formerly of Team 3D, led by Craig "Torbull" Levine)
- Laurent "Warmach1ne" Keoula
- Yaz "clowN" Ammari
- Trevor "p0s" Randolph
- Johnny "r0ckst4r" Clark (who left due to his band, "Red Red Wine")
- Ryan "phamm" Pham (formerly of United 5, led by Jason "moses" O'Toole)
- Lloyd "shaffeR" Shaffer (formerly of Team STUDs, led by David "davvv" Titarenco)
- Chris "deppy" DePaul (formerly of Team STUDs)
- Justin "Sunman" Summy
- Cody "kodec" Sackett
- Ben "Flodog" Taylor
- Jarred "Remix" Shaw

== Owners/Managers ==
- John "Brex" Atwell
- Matthew "Erd" Grover
- Stephanie "Princess" (Assistant)

== Accomplishments ==
- 9th-12th place Everlan 2006
- 1st place Gigabits 2006
- 1st place LANFest 2006
- 1st place TXGF Summer Event
- 1st place Ryu LAN Event 2006
- 1st place Championship Gaming Invitational 2007

=== Sponsors ===
- Nuclear Fallout
- Icemat Audio
- Steel Series
- Xfire
- Hype Energy Drinks
- iBuypower.com
