= FIFA 07 =

2006 video game

- British and Irish cover art with Manchester United's Wayne Rooney (left), and FC Barcelona's Ronaldinho
- Developers: EA Canada; Team Fusion (PSP); Exient Entertainment (DS, GBA); Distinctive Developments (mobile)
- Publisher: Electronic Arts
- Designers: Joe Booth; Hugues Ricour; Kaz Makita
- Series: FIFA
- Platforms: GameCube; PlayStation 2; Windows; Xbox; Xbox 360; PlayStation Portable; Nintendo DS; Game Boy Advance; Java ME
- Release: 28 September 2006: AU: 28 September 2006 (exc. GBA); EU: 29 September 2006; NA: 3 October 2006 PlayStation Portable; EU: 29 September 2006; AU: 5 October 2006; NA: 17 October 2006 Xbox 360; AU: 26 October 2006; EU: 27 October 2006; NA: 31 October 2006
- Genre: Sports (football)
- Modes: Single-player, multiplayer

FIFA 07 (also known as FIFA Football 07 and FIFA 07 Soccer) is a football simulation video game developed by EA Canada and published by Electronic Arts under the EA Sports label for GameCube, PlayStation 2, Windows, Xbox, Xbox 360, PlayStation Portable, Nintendo DS, Game Boy Advance, and Java-compatible mobile devices.

It was the last game in the FIFA series to be released for the GameCube, Xbox, and Game Boy Advance, and the third (although first in the main series) to be released for the Xbox 360 after FIFA 06: Road to FIFA World Cup and 2006 FIFA World Cup.

FIFA 07 sponsored Accrington Stanley for the 2006–07 season, with the FIFA 07 logo displayed on the back of the team's shirts.

== Leagues ==
There are a total of 27 leagues available in FIFA 07. There is also an International league that features some licensed national football teams, and a Rest of World league that includes other notable clubs from around the world.

== Soundtrack ==
Awards from *AIAS Nominations (10th Annual Interactive Achievement Awards): Best Sports Game of 2006, Best Licensed Soundtrack of 2006

- IGN: Game of the Year 2006: Best Licensed Soundtrack (Xbox 360)

== Xbox 360 version ==
Electronic Arts developed a new sports engine for the Xbox 360 version of FIFA 07. This meant not only improved graphics and better controls, but the physics and control were also improved. The game collects more data from the matches than previous version, and thus is able to give a "man of the match" award. The commentary in English is provided by Martin Tyler Xbox 360 only and Andy Gray appears in all versions and Clive Tyldesley commentates the other versions of the game and the commentary in Mexican Spanish is provided by Enrique Bermúdez and Ricardo Peláez.

Extra features include up-to-the-minute real-world game results via real-time, weekly podcasts and news ticker, detailed football stats, information and real-world news available in five languages. Finally, the Xbox 360 version offers a mini-game in the menu and when loading into a game, dropping the player in a one-on-one face off against the goalkeeper on a practice pitch. It also has very limited leagues on the Xbox 360 compared to the other consoles.

EA cut all but seven leagues from the Xbox 360 version of the game — one of which contained only one team (Juventus). According to producer Jean-Charles Gaudechon, this is because the new game engine took so long to develop that EA was not able to implement everything.

A FIFA 07 demo was made available on Xbox Live Marketplace on 6 October 2006.

== Critical reception ==
Reception

Aggregate scores
Aggregator	Score							
Aggregator	DS	GBA	GameCube	PC	PS2	PSP	Xbox	Xbox 360
GameRankings	63%	30.50%	77.19%	77.77%	81.40%	79.36%	85.48%	74.05%
Metacritic	72/100	41/100	80/100	78/100	82/100	80/100	85/100	73/100

Review scores
Publication	Score							
Publication	DS	GBA	GameCube	PC	PS2	PSP	Xbox	Xbox 360
Electronic Gaming Monthly	N/A	N/A	N/A	N/A	N/A	N/A	N/A	6.5/10
Eurogamer	N/A	N/A	N/A	N/A	N/A	N/A	N/A	8/10
Game Informer	N/A	N/A	7.75/10	N/A	7.75/10	N/A	7.75/10	7.25/10
GamePro	N/A	N/A	N/A	4.5/5	4.5/5	N/A	N/A	N/A
GameRevolution	N/A	N/A	N/A	N/A	N/A	N/A	N/A	B
GameSpot	7.1/10	4.1/10	8.2/10	8.5/10	8.4/10	7.3/10	8.7/10	8.1/10
GameSpy	N/A	N/A	N/A	4/5	N/A	N/A	N/A	N/A
GameZone	N/A	N/A	N/A	N/A	N/A	N/A	8.9/10	7.6/10
IGN	7.9/10	N/A	8.4/10	8.5/10	(UK) 8.9/10 (US) 8.5/10	8.5/10	(UK) 8.9/10 (US) 8.5/10	(UK) 7.6/10 (US) 6.8/10
Nintendo Power	N/A	N/A	8/10	N/A	N/A	N/A	N/A	N/A
Official U.S. PlayStation Magazine	N/A	N/A	N/A	N/A	8.5/10	N/A	N/A	N/A
Official Xbox Magazine (US)	N/A	N/A	N/A	N/A	N/A	N/A	8.5/10	7.5/10
PC Gamer (UK)	N/A	N/A	N/A	71%	N/A	N/A	N/A	N/A
Detroit Free Press	N/A	N/A	N/A	N/A	N/A	N/A	N/A	4/4
The Sydney Morning Herald	N/A	N/A	N/A	3.5/5	3.5/5	N/A	3.5/5	N/A

FIFA 07 was met with favorable reception. GameRankings and Metacritic gave it a score of 85.48% and 85 out of 100 for the Xbox version; 81.40% and 82 out of 100 for the PlayStation 2 version; 79.36% and 80 out of 100 for the PSP version; 77.77% and 78 out of 100 for the PC version; 77.19% and 80 out of 100 for the GameCube version; 74.05% and 73 out of 100 for the Xbox 360 version; 63% and 72 out of 100 for the DS version; and 30.50% and 41 out of 100 for the Game Boy Advance version.

FIFA 07 was also the seventh fastest selling game of all time in the United Kingdom across all formats.

The PlayStation 2 version of FIFA 07 received a "Double Platinum" sales award from the Entertainment and Leisure Software Publishers Association (ELSPA), indicating sales of at least 600,000 copies in the United Kingdom. ELSPA gave the PlayStation Portable release a "Platinum" certification, for sales of at least 300,000 copies in the region. In March 2007, Ron Moravek, Vice President and CEO at Electronic Arts Canada told Edmonton Journal Newspaper, that "FIFA 2007 has sold six million copies worldwide."

=== Achievements and awards ===
- IGN - Game of the Year 2006: Best Sports Game (Xbox, PC)
- TeamXbox - Game of The Year 2006: Best Sports Game (Xbox)
- Academy of Interactive Arts & Sciences - 10th Annual Interactive Achievement Awards: Sports Game of the Year (nominated); Outstanding Achievement in Soundtrack (nominated)
- BAFTA Nominations (2007 Video Game Awards): The PC World Gamers Award (PS2)
