= Dead or Alive 4 =

2005 video game

- North American cover art featuring (from top left to bottom right) La Mariposa, Hayabusa, Eliot, Kokoro, Kasumi, Bass, Zack, Jann Lee, Ayane, Tina, Helena, and Christie
- Developer: Team Ninja
- Publisher: Tecmo
- Directors: Tomonobu Itagaki; Katsunori Ehara; Hiroaki Matsui
- Producers: Tomonobu Itagaki; Satoshi Kanematsu; Max Naka
- Designers: Yoshifuru Okamoto; Motohiro Shiga; Yohei Shimbori
- Artists: Yasuo Egawa; Yasushi Nakakura; Hideki Niimi
- Series: Dead or Alive
- Platform: Xbox 360
- Release: December 29, 2005: NA/JP: December 29, 2005; EU: January 27, 2006; AU: March 13, 2006
- Genre: Fighting
- Modes: Single player, multiplayer

Dead or Alive 4 (Note: Japanese: DEAD OR ALIVE(デッドオアアライブ) 4, Hepburn: Deddo oa Araibu Fō; abbreviated as DOA4) is a 2005 fighting game developed by Team Ninja and published by Tecmo for the Xbox 360. It is the fourth main entry in the Dead or Alive fighting series following Dead or Alive 3 (2001), the last fighting game directed by Tomonobu Itagaki before his departure from Tecmo and its merger with Koei into Koei Tecmo in 2009.

The story focuses on the continuing war between the Mugen Tenshin Ninja Clan and DOATEC, and Helena Douglas taking over the mantle of DOATEC as its new president, determined to fight against the corruption within the enormous organization. The story mode introduces the players to new characters and opponents via combat which can then be played in the other modes. New features are introduced in the gameplay and the online mode.

Dead or Alive 4 was generally well received with positive reviews scoring 85/100 on both Metacritic and GameRankings. By mid-2006, it had sold over 1 million copies worldwide. In 2021, Dead or Alive 4 became available on Xbox One and Xbox Series X/S through backward compatibility. It was followed by Dead or Alive: Dimensions in 2011 and Dead or Alive 5 in 2012.

== Gameplay ==
Various avatars interacting in a virtual environment during the online mode

Dead or Alive 4 has a number of updates in reference to previous titles. New to DOA4 is the introduction of the "Bounce Combo" system. After knocking an opponent to the ground with a strike attack, players can execute a Bounce Combo to perform further attacks on the opponent when they are bouncing off the ground. Low attacks and some mid attacks can now be performed on opponents while they are down.

Certain stages now have moving obstacles that will cause damage to fighters if they are hit by them, and using a counter hold at the right timing can help players avoid being hit by them.

Certain stages now also have obstacles in which fighters can be knocked over them, and when the opponent is on the other side of an obstacle, players can jump over them and they can also perform flying attacks.

New to the online mode is the introduction of Avatars and Virtual Worlds, making it the first fighting game to include these features. Players can customize their Avatars and the environment and furniture in their Lobby. Players can take part in voice or text-based chat with other players while in the Lobby room. Award points are earned from winning online battles and players can use the points to buy accessories for their Avatars and Lobby rooms.

Characters' move lists have been vastly updated and four new characters have been added to the fighting roster, with returns from a couple of past characters as well. The counter system has been tightened, making the window for counters shorter and more difficult to execute, and the amount of damage that counters inflict has been changed. However, like Dead or Alive 3, it features a relatively low number of costumes (excluding variants), and several characters now had to be unlocked by the player, including Helena.

== Characters ==
Ryu Hayabusa from Ninja Gaiden fighting against Halo's SPARTAN-458 in the Nassau Station stage during the versus mode

Dead or Alive 4 features a total of 23 fighters, including 22 playable characters and the boss character Alpha-152. Returning characters are Ayane, Bass Armstrong, Bayman, Brad Wong, Christie, Hayate, Hitomi, Jann Lee, Kasumi, Leifang, Ryu Hayabusa, Tina Armstrong, and Zack.

DOA4 features three new playable characters: Kokoro, a young geisha in training; Eliot, a 16-year-old boy from England and protégé to Gen Fu; and La Mariposa, a female Lucha Libre wrestler. In addition, DOA4 features a playable unlockable character from the Halo series, a female Spartan supersoldier going by the name "Spartan-458" (with a Halo-themed stage, Nassau Station); it would later be revealed that her real name would be "Nicole".

=== New ===
- Alpha-152 ^{a}, the final stage of DOATEC's human weapon series Project Alpha, created from Kasumi's DNA by the evil scientist, Victor Donovan.
- Eliot, a British xingyiquan practitioner and the only apprentice of the legendary "Immovable Fist", Gen Fu. Having doubts about himself and questioning why Gen Fu chose him as his successor, Eliot enters the tournament to find out if he has the right to carry on Gen Fu's legacy.
- Kokoro, a young Japanese maiko currently training to become a geisha. Though she enjoys her lessons, Kokoro's heart and soul truly belong to her bajiquan, and despite the worries of her mother Miyako, she enters to the tournament to test herself.
- La Mariposa, real name Lisa, a luchadora who hides her past and true identity underneath her flamboyant costume. La Mariposa rose like a comet to the peak of stardom only a short while after her debut, and has never lost a match.
- Spartan-458 ^{b} ^{c} ^{d}, real name Nicole, a supersoldier and close-quarters combat practitioner of Microsoft's Halo series. She is the result of the collaboration between Tecmo's Team Ninja and Microsoft's Bungie.

=== Returning ===
- Ayane
- Bass Armstrong
- Bayman
- Brad Wong
- Christie
- Ein ^{c} ^{d}
- Gen Fu ^{c} ^{d}
- Hayate
- Helena Douglas ^{c}
- Hitomi
- Jann Lee
- Kasumi
- Leifang
- Leon ^{c} ^{d}
- Ryu Hayabusa
- Tengu ^{c} ^{d}
- Tina Armstrong
- Zack

^a Unplayable boss
^b Guest character
^c Unlockable character
^d Unplayable in Story Mode

== Plot ==
Helena Douglas, daughter of the founder and former chairman of the Dead or Alive Tournament Executive Committee, Fame Douglas, takes over the mantle of DOATEC as its second chairman, determined to fight against the corruption within the enormous organization. After losing both her father and her beloved mother to the darkness of conspiracy, Helena chose to place herself in the middle of the maelstrom in order to put an end to the chain of tragedy once and for all.

The man who holds the true power at DOATEC, Victor Donovan, locked himself in the committee's Bio Lab Core once again to continue coveting his dream of creating the perfect human weapon. His new project, code named "Alpha-152", is the result of the ultimate evolution of hyper-cloning technology, birthed from a DNA sample of Kasumi.

The war between the Mugen Tenshin Ninja Clan and DOATEC continues. During the last tournament, after Ayane successfully defeats DOATEC's last creation, Omega, Hayate returned to the Mugen Tenshin village, taking over the leadership. Now leader, his heart burns with the desire of revenge as he goes on a quest to put an end to DOATEC for the innumerable pain the Mugen Tenshin Ninjas have suffered from the organization. During the fourth tournament, Hayate brought together the most powerful group of ninjas known to man. He is accompanied by Ayane, Ryu Hayabusa, and other members of the Mugen Tenshin; Kasumi, though reluctant and fearing the worst, is dragged into the events herself as she follows her brother.

The forces of Mugen Tenshin launches an assault on DOATEC's primary headquarters, the gigantic 999 meter (3,277-foot-tall) Tri-tower buildings. Other competitors such as Brad Wong, Jann Lee, Leifang, Zack, along with newcomers, Eliot and Kokoro, were also among the chaos during the assault. Hayate is approached by a luchadora named La Mariposa who reveals to him about her manipulation of him in coming to destroy DOATEC. Hayate thanks her, stating that she did him a favor, and he battles her to repay her. Hayate later comes across a vengeful Bayman, who vows to finish off Donovan for his betrayal to him. Hayate also states his reasons for wanting revenge on the mad scientist as well. Bayman warns Hayate not to interfere in his plan for revenge, but Hayate states that he can't let him fool things up while the ninjas proceed with their assault. La Mariposa comes across Helena and reveals to her about her involvement in DOATEC's Epsilon project before the second tournament and her reason for Hayate coming to DOATEC. La Mariposa angrily resents Donovan and wants to put an end to all of his motives. Helena reveals to her that stopping Alpha-152 from awakening is now impossible due to her shutdown mechanism being destroyed, and only one option is left to stop Alpha. Kasumi later confronts Helena, telling her to stop the war between DOATEC and the Mugen Tenshin. Helena refuses, stating that Hayate and the others will stop at nothing until DOATEC is destroyed, and she is willing do anything to stop Donovan and Alpha-152 from causing havoc in the world. Helena attempts to shoot Kasumi with a handgun but Kasumi is saved by Hayabusa. Helena later comes across Christie, who reveals that she was her mother's killer. Almost breaking down in sadness over her loss and now boiling with anger, Helena fights Christie.

The ninjas' assault left the Tri-tower buildings in an inferno, and the buildings' auto-destruct sequence activated by Helena would lead to the buildings' ultimate destruction. While the ninjas continue their assault and Kasumi fights Alpha-152, Helena strolls through the burning buildings, reflecting on certain events of her life from childhood into adulthood, leading up to the current events. Helena decides to end her own life, committing suicide by going up to the Tri-tower Heliport between the three buildings and letting herself be consumed by the flames of the burning buildings as Kasumi and Ayane helplessly watch from afar. Suddenly, Zack came flying in with a chopper, saving Helena before the Tri-tower buildings collapsed to dust.

== Development and release ==
Dead or Alive 4 promo at the Tokyo Game Show 2005

On May 12, 2005, the first screenshots were leaked via the elotrolado.net message boards. The first official screenshots, in-game demos and cinematics were presented by Microsoft at press conferences, with Dead or Alive 4 originally scheduled as a launch game for the Xbox 360. In an interview with Famitsu Xbox, Tomonobu Itagaki remarked that he spent 99% of his time on development, only sleeping 40 minutes in four days. Technical assistance for Dead or Alive 4 was given by Blindlight.

Dead or Alive 4 was delayed many times before being released on December 29, 2005, more than a month after the Xbox 360 debuted, having been initially held back by retailers. Famitsu Xbox editor-in-chief Munetatsu Matsui pointed to Dead or Alive 4's absence as a launch title as the main factor behind the slow sales of the Xbox 360 in Japan. It is the first main fighting game in the series (and third overall, following Dead or Alive Ultimate) to receive a Mature rating by the ESRB.

Since Dead or Alive 4's release, a demo version has been available for free download via Xbox Live on July 24, 2006. While the demo showcases the final version, it is a very limited version and only a handful of the features are accessible, while the rest are locked down. Only the Time Attack and Verses modes are playable, there are just five stages available, and only Kasumi, Hayabusa, Brad, Tina, Eliot, and La Mariposa are playable. Some of the settings are also locked-out.

Two songs by the American rock band Aerosmith also appear in Dead or Alive 4. "Eat the Rich" was the opening theme, and "Amazing" was played during Helena's ending movie and over the credits.

The Platinum Hits, Platinum Collection, and Xbox Classics editions were released in 2006. As of November 15, 2021, a digital version of Dead or Alive 4 became available on Xbox Live worldwide in addition of becoming backward compatible on the Xbox One and Xbox Series X/S.

=== Merchandise ===
An arcade controller peripheral for Dead or Alive 4 made by Japanese video game peripheral manufacturer Hori was released alongside the game, exclusively for the Xbox 360.

The Soundtrack CD Dead or Alive 4 Original Sound Trax (KWCD-1009) was released in Japan by Wake Up in 2006. A guide book titled Dead or Alive 4: Official Game Guide by Prima Games was published in North America on January 24, 2006. Three guide books were published in Japan in 2005-2006: Dead or Alive 4 Official Guide Basic File (by Famitsu Xbox / Enterbrain), Dead or Alive 4 Best Shot (by SoftBank), and Dead or Alive 4 Official Guide Master File (by Enterbrain). The Platinum Collection edition was released in Japan on November 1, 2007.

== Reception ==
Reception

Aggregate scores
Aggregator	Score
GameRankings	85.49%
Metacritic	85/100

Review scores
Publication	Score
1Up.com	C+
Famitsu	39/40
Game Informer	9/10
GamePro	5.0/5
GameRevolution	B+
GameSpot	8.8/10
GameSpy	4/5
GamesRadar+	7/10
IGN	9.0/10
PALGN	8.0/10
TeamXbox	9.1/10

Awards
Publication	Award
GameSpot's E3 2005 Editors' Choice Awards	Best High-Definition Movies
IGN's Best of E3 2005 Awards	Xbox 360: Best Non-Playable Presentation
Famitsu Awards	Super Visual Award

Dead or Alive 4 received generally favorable reviews from critics. Review aggregators GameRankings and Metacritic gave the game a score of 85.49% and 85/100, respectively. In Japan, Famitsu gave it a near-perfect score of 39 out of 40.

Douglass C. Perry of IGN called Dead or Alive 4 "a fighter with subtle yet significant changes and an online mode that rocks" and "a move in the right direction for the series". Perry praised the fighting system as "deeper and more sophisticated", and praising the online mode as "a tremendous improvement, giving the series another layer of play that should take off and breathe new life into the series". Greg Kasavin of GameSpot wrote: "It's simple: If you like fighting games, DOA4 is for you. Between its great selection of powerful fighters, its terrific action, and its addictive online mode, there's an awful lot to sink your teeth into, learn, and master in this latest and greatest installment in the series." Che Chou of 1Up.com said: "DOA4 comes very close to being a competitive fighting game, but its failings in a few key areas cripple its longevity. Although it's by far the series' best entry, DOA4 still boggles the mind with its insanely unbalanced characters and easily exploitable moves." Matt Conzen of eToychest praised Dead or Alive 4's online mode, calling it "innovative" and how it "fuels the fire that Team Ninja set forth on the Xbox 360 community", calling Dead or Alive "the only console fighting series with a decent online mode", overall calling Dead or Alive 4 "a game that carries the easy to play, difficult to master label, but is well worth mastering in the long run" and how "Dead or Alive 4 is a must play for any fighting game fan". Play Magazine stated: "They don't make 3D fighters more beautiful and fluid than Dead or Alive 4." Gamerfeed called Dead or Alive 4 "so close to being flawless it's unbelievable". Game Informer stated how "The incredible craftsmanship that went into this title makes it the pinnacle in the series and another fantastic Xbox Live application." Gamer 2.0 stated: "If you want to be visually impressed, Itagaki and his Team Ninja have knocked another one out of the park with this game." Official Xbox Magazine wrote: "Fan's of Itagaki's "jujitsu-jousting" philosophy….can comfortably mark DOA 4 as the most refined version of their beloved fighter to date."

=== Sales and awards ===
Dead or Alive 4 sold over 1 million copies by mid-2006, with that number increasing to over 1.2 million worldwide by 2007. It came in number 9 on Japanese charts with over 62,000 copies sold during the first week of January 2006. Prior to release, Dead or Alive 4's E3 presentation was awarded "Best High-Definition Movies" by Gamespot, and "Best Non-Playable Xbox 360 Presentation" by IGN. After its release, Famitsu awarded Dead or Alive 4 the "Super Visual Award". It was also nominated for "Xbox Game of the Year" at the Golden Joystick Awards, and "Best Fighting Game" at the Spike Video Game Awards, but lost to The Elder Scrolls IV: Oblivion and Mortal Kombat: Armageddon, respectively. Dead or Alive 4 was re-issued in the Platinum Hits, Platinum Collection, and Xbox Classics line of games in 2006.

== Legacy ==
Dead or Alive 4 CGS event broadcast on national TV

Dead or Alive 4 was a "killer app" for the Xbox 360, the first fighting game for the system, and was included in the esport leagues, Evolution Championship Series (Evo), Championship Gaming Series (CGS) and World Cyber Games (WCG). It was the second fighting game included in the WCG after Dead or Alive Ultimate. Dead or Alive 4's competitive scene became the first competitive fighting game scene to be televised with its inclusion in the CGS esport league in 2007 and 2008. The CGS league was operated and fully broadcast by DirecTV in association with British Sky Broadcasting (BSkyB) and STAR TV. Dead or Alive 4 is credited for launching the careers of pro-gamers Kat Gunn (Mystik) and Vanessa Arteaga (Vanessa), who would become two of the gaming industry's highest paid women pro-gamers. It is also credited for expanding the career of pro-gamer Emmanuel Rodriguez (MASTER), who entered the competitive fighting game scene in 2004, first competing in Dead or Alive 3 and Dead or Alive Ultimate, followed by Dead or Alive 4 in 2006, and later became a Koei Tecmo employee in 2012.

Dead or Alive 4 is featured in the Guinness World Records for being the "First 7th-generation fighting videogame", and the "First retail game to include "zero point" achievements". Dead or Alive 4 player, Reginald Wysinger (ElectrifiedMann), holds the Guinness World Record for the "Fastest "Time Attack" completion on Dead or Alive 4 ("Very Hard")". Emmanuel Rodriguez (MASTER) holds the Guinness World Record for the "Most Dead or Alive Tournament title wins" with Dead or Alive 4 among the games he had won in.

Dead or Alive 4 was the first fighting game to feature Avatars and Virtual Worlds in its Online Mode. The innovative fighting game features were later expanded upon in the short-lived Dead or Alive Online in 2008, and were later featured in other fighting games such as Street Fighter 6 and Tekken 8.

In 2008, GamePro staff ranked it as the 11th best fighting game, stating: "The first new-generation fighter to be released, Dead or Alive 4 still makes a strong case as the best one. [...] This is a fighting game that can stand in the ring with any major series." In 2009, Virgin Media ranked it as the seventh top 20 beat 'em-up of all time. In 2011, Peter Rubin of Complex ranked it as the 28th-best fighting game of all time. It was also featured in 1001 Video Games You Must Play Before You Die. In 2025, Rolling Stone considered it as the best Xbox 360 fighting game, placing it 18th in the "20 Best Xbox 360 Games of All Time".
