= Championship Gaming Series =

Defunct esports league

- Sport: Esports
- Founded: 2007
- Folded: 2008
- Commissioner: Andy Reif
- No. of teams: 18
- Countries: 12
- Last champion: (United Kingdom) Birmingham Salvo
- Broadcasters: DirecTV, British Sky Broadcasting, STAR TV (Asia)

The Championship Gaming Series (CGS) was a professional esports league in the United States, that operated from 2007 to 2008. It was a global league that featured teams representing cities from around the world. The CGS aimed to bring a traditional sports league format to competitive gaming, with teams, franchises, and a regular season leading to playoffs and a championship. The CGS was preceded by the 2006 Championship Gaming Invitational, a television pilot featuring several future CGS players. The league was founded in 2007 and was owned and operated by DirecTV in association with British Sky Broadcasting (BSkyB) and STAR TV. Games played in the CGS included titles such as Counter-Strike: Source, FIFA, Dead or Alive 4, Project Gotham Racing 3, and Forza Motorsport 2. The league had a television broadcast deal, and matches were aired on various networks. Despite initial hype and investment, the CGS faced financial challenges and eventually ceased operations in 2008.

== History ==
=== Concept and buildout ===
In 2005, David Hill, the president of Fox Sports, left his role to assume the presidency of the satellite TV company DirecTV. Shortly after, he discovered competitive gaming, influenced by his grandchildren. Recognizing the potential of esports, Hill became an early participant in the industry. Drawing on his experience from Fox Sports, he understood the challenges broadcasters might face with the rising popularity of esports, particularly concerning bidding wars for broadcasting rights. When conceptualizing what eventually became the Championship Gaming Series, Hill wanted DirecTV to secure ownership of the broadcasting rights for the league. Hill secured over US$50 million from News Corporation, associated with Rupert Murdoch, to finance the new venture for a period of five years.

The CGS initially targeted the core esports audience for support and embarked on a recruitment campaign to attract well-known figures. Exclusivity was crucial to maintain the value of CGS, requiring players to commit exclusively to the league. Initially, the CGS aimed for complete exclusivity, but some team owners voiced concerns privately, expressing that this approach could restrict their earnings and potential sponsorship deals. Some franchises desired participation in local events for market exposure, and while CGS had reservations, the CGS adjusted contractual agreements to incorporate "Limited Exclusivity," allowing teams to attend other events with express written permission. However, certain conditions applied, including wearing CGS jerseys, utilizing CGS players or approved substitutes (taxi players), and promoting CGS in media appearances.

In July 2006, a pilot episode called the Championship Gaming Invitational (CGI) was taped at Treasure Island in San Francisco, California. A second CGI then took place in Santa Monica, California, on December 16, 2006. On January 8, 2007, at the International Consumer Electronics Show, DirecTV announced the official launch of the Championship Gaming Series. The first season was to be broadcast from July to December. The league immediately faced setbacks, as in March 2007, Hill returned to Fox after News Corp's stake in DirecTV was sold to Liberty Media. DirecTV then partnered with Britain's British Sky Broadcasting (BSkyB) and China's Star TV and secured sponsorships with Mountain Dew and Alienware. To replace Hill, Andy Reif, who had formerly worked with AVP Pro Beach Volleyball Tour and Paramount Pictures, was brought on to the league's CEO and commissioner.

In determining the gaming titles for the league, CGS aimed to secure exclusive broadcasting rights by collaborating with game publishers. The league prioritized titles with modern graphics and, for its inaugural season, selected fighting game Dead or Alive 4, soccer simulator FIFA 2007 and racing simulator Project Gotham Racing 3 in their first season. The league also debated on whether or not to have Counter-Strike as one of their games, considering its potentially violent and disorienting nature for viewers. However, the league ultimately chose to include it to enhance legitimacy. Despite Counter-Strike being a more popular esports title, they opted for its sequel Counter-Strike: Source, due to its more contemporary graphics.

=== Launch and expansion ===
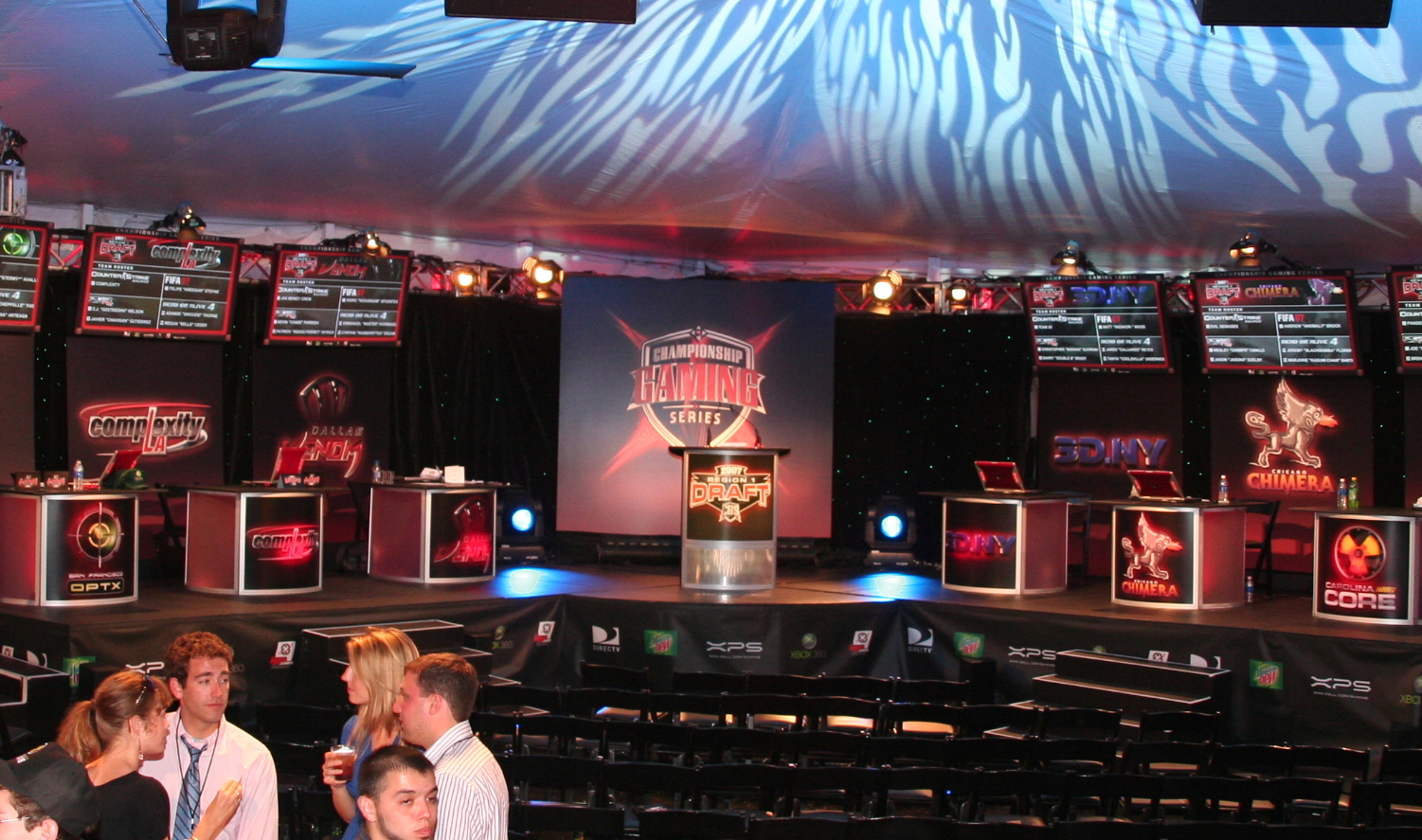
The stage for the 2007 draft at the Playboy Mansion

The inaugural CGS season showcased franchises from six major American cities, with teams from other global regions qualifying through tournaments rather than a structured league format as in the United States. The American teams were given names associated with major cities and regions: New York, Los Angeles, Dallas, Carolina, Chicago, and San Francisco. However, these designations primarily served to mimic the structure of traditional professional sports leagues, and none of the players physically relocate to those cities. Both CompLexity and Team 3D were sold to DirecTV, rebranding to Los Angeles CompLexity and New York 3D, respectively, and were run by their existing general managers. The four other teams, the Carolina Core, Chicago Chimera, Dallas Venom, San Francisco Optx, were run by general managers of other existing Counter-Strike teams.

The inaugural season's draft took place at the Playboy Mansion in San Francisco in June 2007, where each of the six teams selected ten players to participate in the CGS: one six-person Counter-Strike squad, one male and one female Dead or Alive 4 player, one Project Gotham Racing 3 player, and one FIFA 07 player. The first pick of the draft was female Dead or Alive 4 player Vanessa Arteaga, who was selected by San Francisco. In regards to the Counter-Strike picks, both Los Angeles and New York selected their respective squads, Dallas selected JaX Money Crew, Carolina selected Team Pandemic, Chicago selected Evil Geniuses, and San Francisco selected EFGaming.

The sixty players selected in the draft would reside in corporate housing in Marina del Rey for two months while filming season one on a nearby Los Angeles soundstage. Each of these players would receive a starting salary of $30,000, covering the duration of the two-month shoot in Los Angeles. In addition to the salaries, a reported $5 million in prize money was available in the first year. This encompassed payouts for promotional events, global qualifiers, and the World Championships scheduled for December. The inaugural season of the CGS reportedly garnered a viewership of 50 million, with 90% of viewers coming from Asia. The three regional finals were hosted in Los Angeles, London, and Kuala Lumpur. The World Championships in December, which also took place in Los Angeles, were won by the Chicago Chimera.

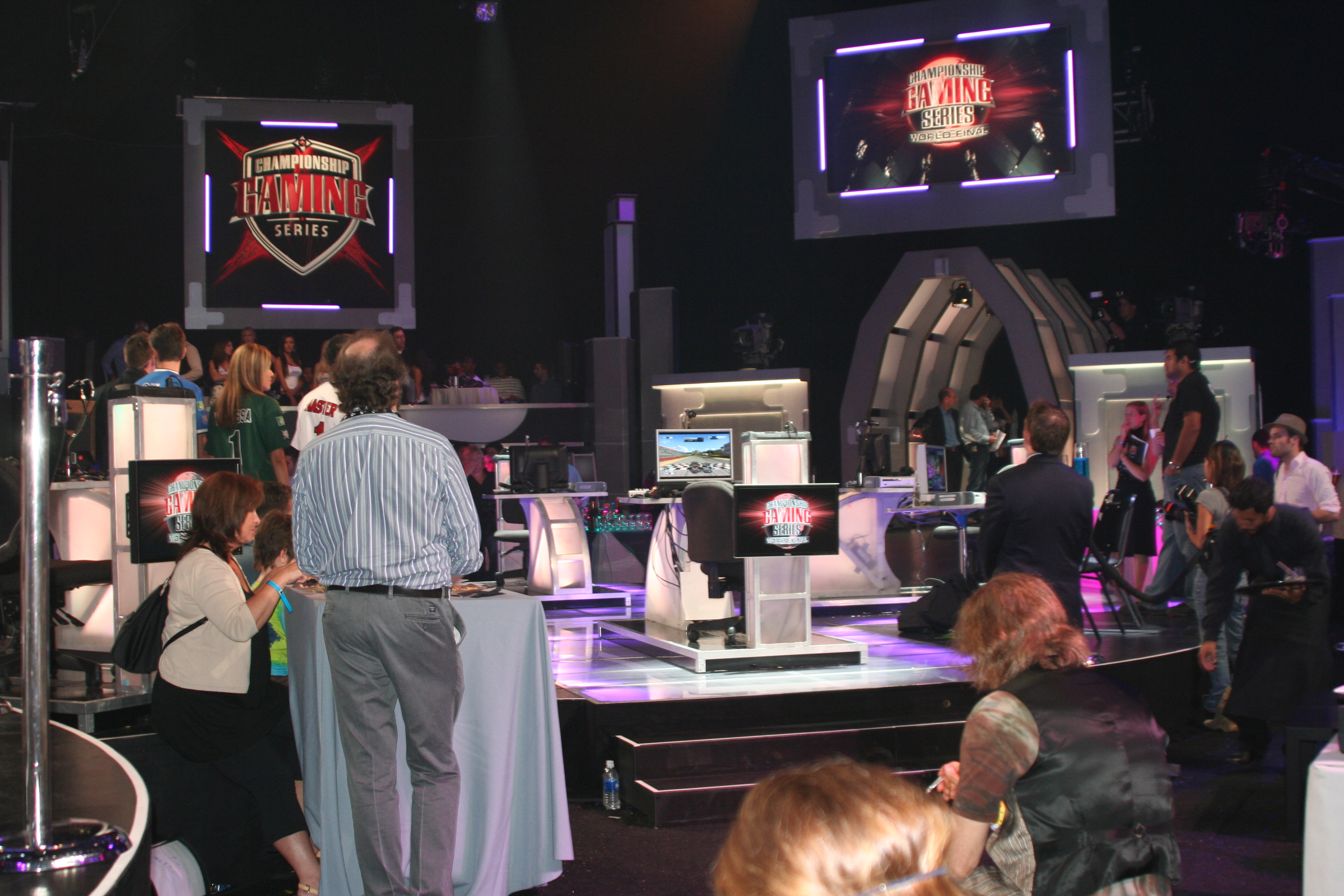
Stage for the 2008 World Championship

The CGS expanded for its second season expansion by introducing teams in Kuala Lumpur and Dubai. The league had also aimed to bring established European teams like SK Gaming and Fnatic on board, but the high costs involved led these teams to maintain their independence. The league made two changes to the games that were played, which included FIFA 07 updating to FIFA 08 and Project Gotham Racing 3 changing to Forza Motorsport 2. The 2008 draft took place at South by Southwest in Austin, Texas, in March 2008. The same month, CNET reported that the CGS was building a 1,000-seat arena and training facility that would be used exclusively for matches in Wuhan, China. The CGS reported that 2 million viewers watched its second season on DirecTV. The World Final Championship was held in June 2008 and was won by the United Kingdom's Birmingham Salvos.

In August 2008, Andy Reif was replaced as commissioner with Dale Hopkins, the former chief operating officer of G4.

=== Termination and aftermath ===
The substantial growth of the league in its second season consumed a significant portion of DirecTV's initial $50 million commitment. Coinciding with a challenging economic climate as the global economy approached one of the worst recessions in decades, the CGS announced in November 2008 that it would be shutting down.

The presence of the CGS had significant consequences for the esports landscape, with games unprepared for professional tiers facing dissolution. In the case of Counter-Strike: Source, a number of players chose to stop competing in the game, contributing to a noticeable gap between professional and amateur players. Amateur organizations also felt pressured to provide salaries that were unsustainable, akin to those offered by CGS, in order to attract talent. This, especially in North America, led to a culture where players prioritized individual interests, forming teams for assured victories and attending events selectively based on profitability. Moreover, the CGS's impact extended to competing companies, particularly if their flagship game was part of CGS and represented a substantial competitive threat. Elite-level talent from these organizations couldn't participate, leaving second-tier teams outside CGS with less thrilling victories and reduced prize funds. Additionally, the challenges faced by CGS affected the perception of esports on television among potential outside investors. Despite the aspiration to showcase esports on television and garner mainstream attention, the struggles of CGS portrayed esports as unprepared and labeled it a risky venture that fell short of budgeted expectations.

== Format ==
=== General structure ===
Before the start of the season, the CGS holds scouting combines in various cities around the world. Based on the results of the combines, the general managers then meet and draft players to participate in the league. Combines are open to all comers.

In 2008, leagues could protect players in two of the five events; everyone else is put into the draft pool and can go to any team.

=== Scoring system ===
Points are awarded for each event as follows:

- DOA 4: One point per each round won, regardless of result; this event is best five of nine rounds
- Forza Motorsport 2: Teams are awarded four points for the winning driver, two points for the second-place driver, and one point for third place.
- FIFA 08: Gamers participate in an eight-minute minigame. Each goal is scored one point for the team competition. If the game is tied, penalty kicks determine the winner, and each goal also counts as a point in the team totals.
- Counter-Strike Source: This event consists of 18 rounds. All games count toward the team total, one point per winning round. If the teams tie after 18 rounds, a sudden death round is played. There is also a tie-breaking round if the teams are tied in the overall points.

No bonus points are awarded to any team for winning an event.

== Broadcast ==
The first season of the CGS was originally planned to be pre-taped, as was done in the previous pilot events. However, that plan was changed, and the entire season was filmed live. The first season was broadcast on DirecTV beginning on July 9, 2007, with two-hour episodes running twice weekly. The matches took place at a movie sound stage in Manhattan Beach, with an audience of around 200 people. The 2008 North American matches and the world tournament took place at the Barker Hangar in Santa Monica. Tickets were free and were distributed by Jam Packed Entertainment.

Commentators on the broadcasts included Paul "ReDeYe" Chaloner, Marcus "djWHEAT" Graham, and Johnathan "Fatal1ty" Wendel. Hosts throughout the years included DJ Stryker, Tommy Tallarico, and Andrew Siciliano.

== Regions and teams ==
Region	Team	Location	First season
North America	Carolina Core	(United States) Charlotte, North Carolina	2007
North America	Chicago Chimera	(United States) Chicago, Illinois	2007
North America	Dallas Venom	(United States) Dallas, Texas	2007
North America	Los Angeles Complexity	(United States) Los Angeles, California	2007
North America	New York 3D	(United States) New York City, New York	2007
North America	San Francisco Optx	(United States) San Francisco, California	2007
Latin America	Mexico City Furia	Mexico City, Mexico	2007
Latin America	Rio Sinistro	Rio de Janeiro, Brazil	2007
Europe/UK	Berlin Allianz	Berlin, Germany	2007
Europe/UK	Birmingham Salvo	Birmingham, United Kingdom	2007
Europe/UK	London Mint	London, United Kingdom	2007
Europe/UK	Stockholm Magnetik	Stockholm, Sweden	2007
Pan-Asia	Seoul Jinhwa	Seoul, South Korea	2007
Pan-Asia	Wuhan Dragon	Wuhan, China	2007
Pan-Asia	Singapore Sword	Singapore	2007
Pan-Asia	Sydney Underground	Sydney, Australia	2007
Pan-Asia	Dubai Mirage	Dubai, United Arab Emirates	2008
Pan-Asia	Kuala Lumpur Taufan	Kuala Lumpur, Malaysia	2008
