= List of Case Closed films =

List of films based on the Detective Conan manga and anime series

- Case Closed

名探偵コナン (Meitantei Konan)
- Genre: Mystery; Thriller
Further information
Anime film
The Time Bombed Skyscraper
Directed by	Kenji Kodama
Produced by	Masahito Yoshioka; Michihiko Suwa
Written by	Kazunari Kouchi
Music by	Katsuo Ōno
Studio	TMS-Kyokuichi
Licensed by	NA: Funimation (former)
Released	April 19, 1997
Runtime	94 minutes
Anime film
The Fourteenth Target
Directed by	Kenji Kodama
Produced by	Masahito Yoshioka; Michihiko Suwa
Written by	Kazunari Kouchi
Music by	Katsuo Ōno
Studio	TMS-Kyokuichi
Licensed by	NA: Funimation (former)
Released	April 18, 1998
Runtime	99 minutes
Anime film
The Last Wizard of the Century
Directed by	Kenji Kodama
Produced by	Masahito Yoshioka; Michihiko Suwa
Written by	Kazunari Kouchi
Music by	Katsuo Ōno
Studio	TMS-Kyokuichi
Licensed by	NA: Funimation (former)
Released	April 17, 1999
Runtime	99 minutes
Anime film
Captured in Her Eyes
Directed by	Kenji Kodama
Produced by	Masahito Yoshioka; Michihiko Suwa
Written by	Kazunari Kouchi
Music by	Katsuo Ōno
Studio	TMS Entertainment
Licensed by	NA: Funimation (former)
Released	April 22, 2000
Runtime	100 minutes
Anime film
Countdown to Heaven
Directed by	Kenji Kodama
Produced by	Masahito Yoshioka; Michihiko Suwa
Written by	Kazunari Kouchi
Music by	Katsuo Ōno
Studio	TMS Entertainment
Licensed by	NA: Funimation (former)
Released	April 21, 2001
Runtime	100 minutes
Anime film
The Phantom of Baker Street
Directed by	Kenji Kodama
Produced by	Masahito Yoshioka; Michihiko Suwa
Written by	Hisashi Nozawa
Music by	Katsuo Ōno
Studio	TMS Entertainment
Licensed by	NA: Funimation (former)
Released	April 20, 2002
Runtime	107 minutes
Anime film
Crossroad in the Ancient Capital
Directed by	Kenji Kodama
Produced by	Masahito Yoshioka; Michihiko Suwa
Written by	Kazunari Kochi
Music by	Katsuo Ōno
Studio	TMS Entertainment
Released	April 19, 2003
Runtime	108 minutes
Anime film
Magician of the Silver Sky
Directed by	Yasuichiro Yamamoto
Produced by	Masahito Yoshioka; Michihiko Suwa
Written by	Kazunari Kochi
Music by	Katsuo Ōno
Studio	TMS Entertainment
Released	April 17, 2004
Runtime	108 minutes
Anime film
Strategy Above the Depths
Directed by	Yasuichiro Yamamoto
Produced by	Masahito Yoshioka; Michihiko Suwa
Written by	Kazunari Kochi
Music by	Katsuo Ōno
Studio	TMS Entertainment
Released	April 9, 2005
Runtime	109 minutes
Anime film
The Private Eyes' Requiem
Directed by	Yasuichiro Yamamoto
Produced by	Masahito Yoshioka; Michihiko Suwa
Written by	Hiroshi Kashiwabara
Music by	Katsuo Ōno
Studio	TMS Entertainment
Released	April 15, 2006
Runtime	111 minutes
Anime film
Jolly Roger in the Deep Azure
Directed by	Yasuichiro Yamamoto
Produced by	Masahito Yoshioka; Michihiko Suwa
Written by	Hiroshi Kashiwabara
Music by	Katsuo Ōno
Studio	TMS Entertainment
Released	April 21, 2007
Runtime	107 minutes
Anime film
Full Score of Fear
Directed by	Yasuichiro Yamamoto
Produced by	Masahito Yoshioka; Michihiko Suwa
Written by	Kazunari Kochi
Music by	Katsuo Ōno
Studio	TMS Entertainment
Released	April 19, 2008
Runtime	115 minutes
Anime film
The Raven Chaser
Directed by	Yasuichiro Yamamoto
Produced by	Masahito Yoshioka; Michihiko Suwa
Written by	Kazunari Kochi
Music by	Katsuo Ōno
Studio	TMS Entertainment
Released	April 18, 2009
Runtime	111 minutes
Anime film
The Lost Ship in the Sky
Directed by	Yasuichiro Yamamoto
Produced by	Masahito Yoshioka; Michihiko Suwa
Written by	Kazunari Kochi
Music by	Katsuo Ōno
Studio	TMS Entertainment
Released	April 17, 2010
Runtime	102 minutes
Anime film
Quarter of Silence
Directed by	Yasuichiro Yamamoto (chief); Kobun Shizuno
Produced by	Masahito Yoshioka; Michihiko Suwa
Written by	Kazunari Kochi
Music by	Katsuo Ōno
Studio	TMS Entertainment
Released	April 16, 2011
Runtime	109 minutes
Anime film
The Eleventh Striker
Directed by	Yasuichiro Yamamoto (chief); Kobun Shizuno
Produced by	Keiichi Ishiyama; Michihiko Suwa; Mitomu Asai
Written by	Kazunari Kochi
Music by	Katsuo Ōno
Studio	TMS/V1 Studio
Released	April 14, 2012
Runtime	110 minutes
Anime film
Private Eye in the Distant Sea
Directed by	Kobun Shizuno
Produced by	Keiichi Ishiyama; Michihiko Suwa; Mitomu Asai
Written by	Takeharu Sakurai
Music by	Katsuo Ōno
Studio	TMS/V1 Studio
Released	April 20, 2013
Runtime	110 minutes
Anime film
Lupin the 3rd vs. Detective Conan: The Movie
Directed by	Hajime Kamegaki
Produced by	Takuya Itō; Naoki Iwasa; Takeshi Yamakawa; Isato Yonekura
Written by	Atsushi Maekawa
Music by	Yuji Ohno; Katsuo Ōno
Studio	TMS/Daburu Iguru
Licensed by	NA: Discotek Media
Released	December 7, 2013
Runtime	107 minutes
Anime film
Dimensional Sniper
Directed by	Kobun Shizuno
Produced by	Keiichi Ishiyama; Michihiko Suwa; Mitomu Asai
Written by	Kazunari Kochi
Music by	Katsuo Ōno
Studio	TMS/V1 Studio
Released	April 19, 2014
Runtime	110 minutes
Anime television film
The Disappearance of Conan Edogawa: The Worst Two Days in History
Directed by	Yasuichiro Yamamoto
Produced by	Keiichi Ishiyama; Michihiko Suwa; Mitomu Asai
Written by	Kenji Uchida
Music by	Katsuo Ōno
Studio	TMS/V1 Studio
Released	December 26, 2014
Runtime	93 minutes
Anime film
Sunflowers of Inferno
Directed by	Kobun Shizuno
Produced by	Keiichi Ishiyama; Michihiko Suwa; Mitomu Asai
Written by	Takeharu Sakurai
Music by	Katsuo Ōno
Studio	TMS/V1 Studio
Licensed by	NA: Discotek Media
Released	April 18, 2015
Runtime	112 minutes
Anime film
The Darkest Nightmare
Directed by	Kobun Shizuno
Produced by	Keiichi Ishiyama; Michihiko Suwa; Shūhō Kondō
Written by	Takeharu Sakurai
Music by	Katsuo Ōno
Studio	TMS/V1 Studio
Licensed by	NA: Discotek Media
Released	April 16, 2016
Runtime	112 minutes
Anime television film
Episode One: The Great Detective Turned Small
Directed by	Yasuichiro Yamamoto
Produced by	Shūhō Kondō; Keiichi Ishiyama; Michihiko Suwa; Isato Yonekura
Written by	Yasuichiro Yamamoto; Hiroshi Kashiwabara
Music by	Katsuo Ōno
Studio	TMS/V1 Studio
Licensed by	NA: Discotek Media
Released	December 9, 2016
Runtime	94 minutes
Anime film
The Crimson Love Letter
Directed by	Kobun Shizuno
Produced by	Keiichi Ishiyama; Shūhō Kondō; Isato Yonekura
Written by	Takahiro Okura
Music by	Katsuo Ōno
Studio	TMS/V1 Studio
Licensed by	NA: Discotek Media
Released	April 15, 2017
Runtime	112 minutes
Anime film
Zero the Enforcer
Directed by	Yuzuru Tachikawa
Produced by	Keiichi Ishiyama; Shūhō Kondō; Isato Yonekura
Written by	Takeharu Sakurai
Music by	Katsuo Ōno
Studio	TMS/V1 Studio
Licensed by	NA: Discotek Media
Released	April 13, 2018
Runtime	110 minutes
Anime film
The Fist of Blue Sapphire
Directed by	Chika Nagaoka
Produced by	Keiichi Ishiyama; Shūhō Kondō; Isato Yonekura
Written by	Takahiro Okura
Music by	Katsuo Ōno
Studio	TMS/V1 Studio
Licensed by	NA: Discotek Media
Released	April 12, 2019
Runtime	109 minutes
Anime film
The Scarlet Bullet
Directed by	Chika Nagaoka
Produced by	Keiichi Ishiyama; Shūhō Kondō; Isato Yonekura
Written by	Takeharu Sakurai
Music by	Katsuo Ōno
Studio	TMS/V1 Studio
Released	April 16, 2021
Runtime	112 minutes
Anime film
The Bride of Halloween
Directed by	Susumu Mitsunaka
Produced by	Kiyoaki Terashima; Shūhō Kondō; Takeshi Shioguchi
Written by	Takahiro Okura
Music by	Yugo Kanno
Studio	TMS/Studio 1
Released	April 15, 2022
Runtime	111 minutes
Anime film
Black Iron Submarine
Directed by	Yuzuru Tachikawa
Produced by	Yūhei Okada; Shūhō Kondō; Takeshi Shioguchi
Written by	Takeharu Sakurai
Music by	Yugo Kanno
Studio	TMS/Studio 1
Released	April 14, 2023
Runtime	110 minutes
Anime film
The Million-Dollar Pentagram
Directed by	Chika Nagaoka
Produced by	Yūhei Okada; Shūhō Kondō; Takeshi Shioguchi
Written by	Takahiro Okura
Music by	Yugo Kanno
Studio	TMS/Studio 1
Released	April 12, 2024
Runtime	111 minutes
Anime film
One-Eyed Flashback
Directed by	Katsuya Shigehara
Produced by	Yūhei Okada; Shūhō Kondō; Takeshi Shioguchi
Written by	Takeharu Sakurai
Music by	Yugo Kanno
Studio	TMS/Studio 1
Released	April 18, 2025
Runtime	110 minutes
Anime film
Fallen Angel of the Highway
Directed by	Takahiro Hasui
Produced by	Shūhō Kondō; Takeshi Shioguchi; Yūhei Okada
Written by	Takahiro Okura
Music by	Yugo Kanno
Studio	TMS/Studio 1
Released	April 10, 2026
Runtime	109 minutes

Twenty-nine feature films have been released based on the manga and anime series Detective Conan (名探偵コナン, Meitantei Konan), known as Case Closed in North America. The films have been released in April of each year starting in 1997, excluding 2020. Each film features an original plotline rather than being an adaptation of the manga's story. Two film comics were released for each film. Funimation Entertainment released an English dubbed version of the first six films retaining the same name and story changes as its main Case Closed dub. Bang Zoom! Entertainment released English dubs of Case Closed films through Discotek Media, starting with the Episode One TV special until Black Iron Submarine. Studio Nano now currently produces the English dubs, starting with The Million-dollar Pentagram.

== Film series ==
=== 1. The Time Bombed Skyscraper ===
The first film, Case Closed: The Time Bombed Skyscraper known as Detective Conan: The Time Bombed Skyscraper (名探偵コナン 時計じかけの摩天楼, Meitantei Conan: Tokei-jikake no Matenrō) in Japan, was released in Japanese theaters on April 19, 1997. It was partly based on Gosho Aoyama's planned ending for his previous series, Magic Kaito. In the movie, a chain of bombing cases occur around Tokyo and is related to Shinichi Kudo's past investigations. The Time Bombed Skyscraper was released in North America on Region 1 DVD by Funimation Entertainment on October 3, 2006.

=== 2. The Fourteenth Target ===
The second film, Case Closed: The Fourteenth Target known as Detective Conan: The Fourteenth Target (名探偵コナン 14番目の標的, Meitantei Conan Jūyon banme no Tagetto), in Japan, was released to Japanese theaters on April 18, 1998. The film follows Conan Edogawa as he attempts to stop a serial killer from injuring and, eventually, murdering people related to Richard Moore in an unknown order. The Fourteenth Target was released in North America on Region 1 DVD by Funimation Entertainment on November 20, 2007.

=== 3. The Last Wizard of the Century ===
The third film, Case Closed: The Last Wizard of the Century, known as Detective Conan: The Last Wizard of the Century (名探偵コナン 世紀末の魔術師, Meitantei Conan Seikimatsu no Majutsushi) in Japan, was released to Japanese theaters on April 17, 1999. This movie follows Conan Edogawa as he attempts to thwart Phantom Thief Kid's plan to steal a newly discovered Faberge egg. The Last Wizard of the Century was released in North America on Region 1 DVD by Funimation Entertainment on December 15, 2009.

=== 4. Captured in Her Eyes ===
The fourth film, Case Closed: Captured in Her Eyes, known as Detective Conan: Captured in Her Eyes (名探偵コナン 瞳の中の暗殺者, Meitantei Conan Hitomi no Naka no Ansatsusha) in Japan, was released to Japanese theaters on April 22, 2000. Rachel Moore becomes entangled in a series of murder cases where police officers of a reopened case were victims; She was able to see the culprit but the trauma of witnessing an attempt at murder gave her amnesia and made herself a target of the killer. Captured in Her Eyes was released in North America on Region 1 DVD by Funimation Entertainment on December 29, 2009.

=== 5. Countdown to Heaven ===
The fifth film, Case Closed: Countdown to Heaven, known as Detective Conan: Countdown to Heaven (名探偵コナン 天国へのカウントダウン, Meitantei Conan Tengoku e no Kauntodaun) in Japan, was released to Japanese theaters on April 21, 2001. Conan must respond to a series of brutal murders plaguing a newly built Twin Tower complex and its staff and employees. At the same time, the Black Organization are searching for Shiho Miyano. Countdown to Heaven was released in North America on Region 1 DVD by Funimation Entertainment on January 19, 2010.

=== 6. The Phantom of Baker Street ===
The sixth film, Case Closed: The Phantom of Baker Street, known as Detective Conan: The Phantom of Baker Street (名探偵コナン ベイカー街の亡霊, Meitantei Conan Beikā Sutorīto no Bōrei) in Japan, was released to Japanese theaters on April 20, 2002. The story follows Conan Edogawa and several children as they are trapped in Noah's Ark, a virtual reality game where death will result if they lose the game. The Phantom of Baker Street was released in North America on Region 1 DVD by Funimation Entertainment on February 16, 2010.

=== 7. Crossroad in the Ancient Capital ===
The seventh film, Detective Conan: Crossroad in the Ancient Capital (名探偵コナン 迷宮の十字路, Meitantei Conan Meikyū no Kurosurōdo), was released to Japanese theaters on April 19, 2003. The movie follows Conan and Hattori Heiji in Kyoto as they attempt to unmask antique robbers.

=== 8. Magician of the Silver Sky ===
The eighth film, Detective Conan: Magician of the Silver Sky (名探偵コナン 銀翼の奇術師, Meitantei Conan Gin-yoku no Majishan), was released to Japanese theaters on April 17, 2004. The movie follows a poisoning case on an airliner where both the pilot and co-pilot were also affected, Conan Edogawa and Phantom Thief Kid are forced to take control of the plane.

=== 9. Strategy Above the Depths ===
The ninth film, Detective Conan: Strategy Above the Depths (名探偵コナン 水平線上の陰謀, Meitantei Conan Suiheisenjō no Sutoratejī), was released to Japanese theaters on April 9, 2005. The movie is set on a cruise ship and integrates the murder of the shipbuilder and a shipwreck disaster.

=== 10. The Private Eyes' Requiem ===
The tenth film, Detective Conan: The Private Eyes' Requiem (名探偵コナン 探偵たちの鎮魂歌, Meitantei Conan Tantei-tachi no Rekuiemu), was released to Japanese theaters on April 15, 2006. The plot revolves around Conan Edogawa's investigation of an old murder case as his friends are held hostage in an amusement park.

=== 11. Jolly Roger in the Deep Azure ===
The eleventh film, Detective Conan: Jolly Roger in the Deep Azure (名探偵コナン 紺碧の棺, Meitantei Conan Konpeki no Jorī Rojā), was released to Japanese theaters on April 21, 2007. The movie follows Conan Edogawa as he investigates the murder of two scuba divers searching for the alleged treasure left by pirate Anne Bonny on a Japanese island.

=== 12. Full Score of Fear ===
The twelfth film, Detective Conan: Full Score of Fear (名探偵コナン 戦慄の楽譜, Meitantei Conan Senritsu no Furu Sukoa), was released to Japanese theaters on April 19, 2008. The film follows Conan Edogawa as he attempts to discern the culprit targeting the lead singer for the grand opening of a new concert hall.

=== 13. The Raven Chaser ===
The thirteenth film, Detective Conan: The Raven Chaser (名探偵コナン 漆黒の追跡者, Meitantei Conan Shikkoku no Chesa), was released to Japanese theaters on April 18, 2009. In the movie, a new member of the Black Organization, Irish, manages to find out Conan Edogawa's identity, putting everyone around him in danger.

=== 14. The Lost Ship in the Sky ===
The fourteenth film, Detective Conan: The Lost Ship in the Sky (名探偵コナン 天空の難破船, Meitantei Conan Tenkuu no Rosuto Shippu), was released to Japanese theaters on April 17, 2010. In the film, Jirokichi Suzuki invites Conan Edogawa and his friends to ride the world's largest airship, but an unknown mysterious terrorist group hijacks the ship and releases a deadly virus.

=== 15. Quarter of Silence ===
The fifteenth film, Detective Conan: Quarter of Silence (名探偵コナン 沈黙の15分, Meitantei Conan Chinmoku no Kwōtā), was released to Japanese theaters on April 16, 2011. In the film, Conan Edogawa and his friends go to a town near a recently constructed dam to enjoy snow, as well as to find the truth behind a bombing case.

=== 16. The Eleventh Striker ===
The sixteenth film, Detective Conan: The Eleventh Striker (名探偵コナン 11人目のストライカー, Meitantei Conan Jūichi Ninme no Sutoraikā), was released to Japanese theaters on April 14, 2012. The story revolves around soccer and a timed bomb in the stadium.

=== 17. Private Eye in the Distant Sea ===
The seventeenth film, Detective Conan: Private Eye in the Distant Sea (名探偵コナン 絶海の探偵, Meitantei Conan: Zekkai no Puraibēto Ai), was released to Japanese theaters on April 20, 2013. The story follows a case that occurs on an Aegis destroyer.

=== 18. Dimensional Sniper ===
The eighteenth film, Detective Conan: Dimensional Sniper (名探偵コナン 異次元の狙撃手, Meitantei Conan: Ijigen no Sunaipā), was released to Japanese theaters on April 19, 2014. The story follows the FBI and Japanese Police as they try to stop a sniper causing chaos in Tokyō after killing a number of people.

=== 19. Sunflowers of Inferno ===
The nineteenth film, Case Closed: Sunflowers of Inferno (名探偵コナン 業火の向日葵, Meitantei Conan: Gōka no Himawari), was released to Japanese theaters on April 18, 2015. The movie revolves around the Kaito Kid's announcement of a heist, where he will steal Van Gogh's "Sunflowers" paintings. and Conan's attempts to discover the motives behind his sudden interest in the paintings, leading him to the possibility of an impostor posing as the Kaito Kid. Sunflowers of Inferno was released in the United States on Blu-ray by Discotek Media on January 25, 2022.

=== 20. The Darkest Nightmare ===
The twentieth film, Case Closed: The Darkest Nightmare, known as Detective Conan: The Darkest Nightmare (名探偵コナン 純黒の悪夢(ナイトメア), Meitantei Conan: Junkoku no Naitomea) in Japan, was released to Japanese theaters on April 16, 2016. The movie features Akai, Bourbon and, RUM. The Detective Boys and Professor Agasa meet a woman with amnesia, who regains her memory after seeing beaming colorful light, leading the Men In Black to them. The Darkest Nightmare was released in North America on Blu-ray by Discotek Media on September 28, 2021.

=== 21. Crimson Love Letter ===
The twenty-first film, Case Closed: Crimson Love Letter, known as Detective Conan: Crimson Love Letter (名探偵コナン から紅の恋歌(ラブレター), Meitantei Conan: Kara Kurenai no Rabu Retta) in Japan, was released to Japanese theaters on April 15, 2017. The case follows an incident in Kyoto, where Kazuha is entered into a card competition. Crimson Love Letter was released in North America on Blu-ray by Discotek Media on December 29, 2020.

=== 22. Zero the Enforcer ===
The twenty-second film, Case Closed: Zero the Enforcer, known as Detective Conan: Zero The Enforcer (名探偵コナン ゼロの執行人, Meitantei Conan: Zero no Shikkounin) in Japan, was released to Japanese theaters on April 13, 2018. Out of nowhere, an explosion occurs at Tokyo. The police force tries to find the culprit of this mess, and end up suspecting Mouri Kogoro. Conan finds out that Amuro was the one who framed Kogoro and that Amuro is working with the NPA (National Police Agency). Conan must prove Kogoro's innocence, figure out who the real culprit is, and find out what Amuro is up to. Zero the Enforcer was released in North America on Blu-ray by Discotek Media on September 29, 2020.

=== 23. The Fist of Blue Sapphire ===
The twenty-third film, Case Closed: The Fist of Blue Sapphire, known as Detective Conan: The Fist of Blue Sapphire (名探偵コナン 紺青の拳(フィスト), Meitantei Conan: Konjō no Fisuto) in Japan, was released to Japanese theaters on April 12, 2019. The movie revolves around a Kaito Kid heist taking place in Singapore, the first time the primary setting is in another Asian country. The Fist of Blue Sapphire was released in North America by Discotek Media on July 26, 2022.

=== 24. The Scarlet Bullet ===
The twenty-fourth film, Case Closed: The Scarlet Bullet, known as Detective Conan: The Scarlet Bullet (名探偵コナン 緋色の弾丸, Meitantei Conan: Hiiro no Dangan) in Japan, was supposed to be released to Japanese theaters on April 17, 2020, but was postponed to April 16, 2021, due to the COVID-19 pandemic. The movie revolves around the Akai family as they and Conan investigate incidents that occur in Japan during the World Sports Games. The Scarlet Bullet was released in North America on digital on November 20, 2023.

=== 25. The Bride of Halloween ===
The twenty-fifth film, Case Closed: The Bride of Halloween, known as Detective Conan: The Bride of Halloween (名探偵コナン ハロウィンの花嫁, Meitantei Conan: Halloween no Hanayome) in Japan, was released to Japanese theaters on April 15, 2022. The movie revolves around the incidents in Shibuya that gets Rei Furuya in danger, along with the reappearance of a disguised bomber named "Plamya", who he encountered with his now deceased classmates from the police academy three years ago. The Bride of Halloween was released in North America on digital on August 25, 2024.

=== 26. Black Iron Submarine ===
The twenty-sixth film, Detective Conan: Black Iron Submarine (名探偵コナン 黒鉄の魚影(サブマリン), Meitantei Conan: Kurogane no Sabumarin), was released to Japanese theaters on April 14, 2023. The movie revolves around the new Interpol marine facility "Pacific Buoy", where a female engineer is kidnapped by the Black Organization, seeking for her new-kind face recognition system. Meanwhile, Conan is concerned that Haibara's identity might have been exposed during the incident. Black Iron Submarine was released in North America on digital on August 24, 2025.

=== 27. The Million-Dollar Pentagram ===
The twenty-seventh film, Detective Conan: The Million-dollar Pentagram (名探偵コナン 100万ドルの五稜星, Meitantei Conan: Hyaku-man Doru no Michishirube) was released to Japanese theaters on April 12, 2024. The movie revolves around a Kaito Kid heist taking place in Hakodate, where a mysterious man is murdered with a pentagram sword on his body. Meanwhile, Conan and Heiji need to find the truth behind it, before it's too late.

=== 28. One-Eyed Flashback ===
The twenty-eighth film, Detective Conan: One-eyed Flashback (名探偵コナン 隻眼の残像, Meitantei Conan: Sekigan no Furasshubakku) was releasing to Japanese theaters on April 18, 2025. The movie revolves around a Mouri Kogoro, Yamato Kansuke and Nagano Prefecture police taking place in Nagano Prefecture, When Nobeyama radio observatory, a facility of the JAXA (Japan Aerospace Exploration Agency) in Minamimaki, is threatened with a terrorist attack, Conan, Kogoro, and Nagano Prefecture police, Yamato, Komei and Yui come together to solve the mystery before it plagues Japan.

=== 29. Fallen Angel of the Highway ===
The twenty-ninth film, Detective Conan: Fallen Angel of the Highway (名探偵コナン ハイウェイの堕天使, Meitantei Conan: Haiwei no Datenshi) was released in Japan theaters on April 10, 2026. The movie follows Chihaya Hagiwara, a police officer pursuing a black motorcycle dubbed "Lucifer" driving recklessly around Kanagawa.

=== Untitled thirtieth film ===
The thirtieth film is scheldued in Japan theaters on April 9, 2027.

== Spin-off films ==
=== Lupin the 3rd vs. Detective Conan: The Movie ===
Lupin the 3rd vs. Detective Conan: The Movie (ルパン三世VS名探偵コナン The Movie, Rupan Sansei Bāsasu Meitantei Konan The Movie) was released to Japanese theaters on December 7, 2013. It is a sequel to the 2009 television special Lupin the 3rd vs. Detective Conan. The plot follows Conan as he sets out to apprehend Lupin III, the suspect behind the theft of a jewel called the Cherry Sapphire.

=== Specials ===
Detective Conan: The Disappearance of Conan Edogawa: His History's Worst Two Days, known as Meitantei Conan: Edogawa Conan Shissō Jiken ~Shijō Saiaku no Futsukakan~ (名探偵コナン 江戸川コナン失踪事件 ~史上最悪の二日間~), is a television special which aired in Japan on December 26, 2014. It was released as a theatrical film in South Korea on 12 February 2015.

Case Closed Episode One: The Great Detective Turned Small, known as Detective Conan Episode One: The Great Detective Turned Small (名探偵コナン エピソード"ONE" 小さくなった名探偵, Meitantei Konan Episōdo "Wan" Chīsakunatta Meitantei), is a television special which aired in Japan on December 9, 2016. It was released as a theatrical film in South Korea on February 8, 2017. It was released in North America on Blu-ray by Discotek Media on July 28, 2020.

Detective Conan: The Scarlet Alibi, known as Meitantei Konan: Hiiro no Fuzai Shōmei (名探偵コナン 緋色の不在証明), is a compilation film combining footage from various television anime episodes that center on the Akai family. It was released as a theatrical film with a three-week limited run in Japan from February 11 to March 4, 2021, before the release of Detective Conan: The Scarlet Bullet. The film was also released in Indonesia, Hong Kong and Taiwan. In Vietnam, Detective Conan: The Scarlet Alibi was released to Japanese theaters online on YouTube by POPS in a limited one and a half month.

Detective Conan: Love Story at Police Headquarters ~Wedding Eve~, known as Meitantei Konan: Honchō no Keiji Koi-monogatari Kekkon Zen'ya (名探偵コナン 本庁の刑事恋物語～結婚前夜～), is a television compilation special combining footage from various television anime episodes that center on Wataru Takagi and Miwako Sato, which aired in Japan on April 15, 2022, on the release day of Detective Conan: The Bride of Halloween.

Detective Conan: The Story of Ai Haibara ~Black Iron Mystery Train~, known as Meitantei Konan: Haibara Ai Monogatari ~Kurogane no Misuterī Torein~ (名探偵コナン 灰原哀物語 ～黒鉄のミステリートレイン～), is a compilation film combining footage from "Jet-Black Mystery Train" arc, as well as various television anime episodes that center on Ai Haibara. It was released as a theatrical film with a limited run in Japan from January 6, 2023, before the release of Detective Conan: Black Iron Submarine.

Detective Conan vs. Kid the Phantom Thief, known as Meitantei Konan vs. Kaitō Kiddo (名探偵コナン vs. 怪盗キッド), is a compilation film combining footage from "Conan vs. Kaitō Kid" arc, as well as various television anime episodes that center on Conan and Kaitō Kid, while adding new footage. It was released as a theatrical film with a limited run in Japan from January 5, 2024, before the release of Detective Conan: The Million-dollar Pentagram.

Detective Conan: The Counterfeit Case of Ultra 30, known as Meitantei Conan: 30-gō Satsujin Jiken (名探偵コナン ３０号殺人事件), is a television special as a commemorative work for the 30th anniversary of Detective Conan anime, centers on Conan and the others face a national threat involving the circulation of counterfeit bills. Their investigation leads them to the National Printing Bureau in Nagano, before Conan and Heiji head to Osaka, where the counterfeit bills were allegedly produced.

== Box office performance ==
=== Gross revenue ===
Film	Year	Box office gross revenue			
Film	Year	Japan	China	Korea	Other (est. US$)
The Time Bombed Skyscraper	1997	¥1,100,000,000	—	—	—
The Fourteenth Target	1998	¥1,850,000,000	—	—	—
The Last Wizard of the Century	1999	¥2,600,000,000	—	—	—
Captured in Her Eyes	2000	¥2,500,000,000	—	—	—
Countdown to Heaven	2001	¥2,900,000,000	—	—	—
The Phantom of Baker Street	2002	¥3,400,000,000	CN¥56,552,600	₩717,454,500	—
Crossroad in the Ancient Capital	2003	¥3,200,000,000	CN¥148,000,000	—	—
Magician of the Silver Sky	2004	¥2,800,000,000	—	₩1,158,761,500	$208,198
Strategy Above the Depths	2005	¥2,150,000,000	—	₩2,465,133,000	$307,227
The Private Eyes' Requiem	2006	¥3,030,000,000	—	₩1,199,693,100	$440,288
Jolly Roger in the Deep Azure	2007	¥2,530,000,000	—	₩1,803,389,439	$345,543
Full Score of Fear	2008	¥2,420,000,000	—	₩890,692,400	$480,553
The Raven Chaser	2009	¥3,500,000,000	CN¥9,379,100	₩4,248,881,868	$338,651
The Lost Ship in the Sky	2010	¥3,200,000,000	—	₩4,065,925,171	$338,651
Quarter of Silence	2011	¥3,150,000,000	CN¥27,698,000	₩4,212,992,000	$842,780
The Eleventh Striker	2012	¥3,290,000,000	—	₩3,365,337,000	$490,000
Private Eye in the Distant Sea	2013	¥3,630,000,000	—	—	$269,866
Dimensional Sniper	2014	¥4,110,000,000	—	₩2,769,452,000	$757,332
Sunflowers of Inferno	2015	¥4,480,000,000	CN¥81,625,000	₩3,296,808,900	$10,289,466
The Darkest Nightmare	2016	¥6,330,000,000	CN¥31,124,000	₩3,877,980,500	$1,847,231
Crimson Love Letter	2017	¥6,890,000,000	—	₩3,271,989,761	$2,465,947
Zero the Enforcer	2018	¥9,180,000,000	CN¥127,365,000	₩3,207,824,361	$6,388,431
The Fist of Blue Sapphire	2019	¥9,370,000,000	CN¥232,000,000	₩1,740,689,530	$4,022,445
The Scarlet Bullet	2021	¥7,650,000,000	CN¥216,000,000	₩2,196,867,840	$3,357,722
The Bride of Halloween	2022	¥9,780,000,000	CN¥216,000,000	₩4,990,922,231	$6,762,585
Black Iron Submarine	2023	¥13,880,000,000	CN¥163,000,000	₩7,705,318,105	$10,415,893
The Million-dollar Pentagram	2024	¥15,800,000,000	CN¥287,000,000	₩7,334,914,832	$12,583,918
One-eyed Flashback	2025	¥14,740,000,000	CN¥398,000,000	₩7,271,803,240	$14,296,209
Specials					
Lupin the 3rd vs. Detective Conan	2013	¥4,260,000,000	—	₩1,585,872,205	$320,000
Disappearance of Conan Edogawa	2015	—	—	₩1,885,543,600	$170,000
Episode One	2017	—	—	₩999,362,100	$410,000
The Scarlet School Trip	2020	—	—	₩534,479,660	$862,000
The Scarlet Alibi	2021	¥1,240,000,000	—	—	$673,000
Kaiju Gomera vs. Kamen Yaiba	2022	—	—	—	$160,000
The Story of Ai Haibara	2023	¥732,264,620	—	₩849,594,700	$502,000
Detective Conan vs. Kaito Kid	2024	¥624,845,700	—	₩1,127,498,300	—
The Truth From 17 Years Ago	2025	—	—	₩612,514,900	—
Total		¥156,317,110,320	CN¥1,993,743,700	₩79,387,696,743	$80,345,936

=== Ticket sales ===
Film	Year	Box office ticket sales (est.)				
Film	Year	Japan	China	Korea	Other	Worldwide
The Time Bombed Skyscraper	1997	900,000	—	—	—	900,000
The Fourteenth Target	1998	1,500,000	—	—	—	1,500,000
The Last Wizard of the Century	1999	2,100,000	—	—	—	2,100,000
Captured in Her Eyes	2000	2,000,000	—	—	—	2,000,000
Countdown to Heaven	2001	2,400,000	—	—	—	2,400,000
The Phantom of Baker Street	2002	2,800,000	1,640,600	124,139	—	4,564,739
Crossroad in the Ancient Capital	2003	2,600,000	6,587,500	—	—	9,187,500
Magician of the Silver Sky	2004	2,300,000	—	176,495	—	2,476,495
Strategy Above the Depths	2005	1,700,000	—	389,873	—	2,089,873
The Private Eyes' Requiem	2006	2,500,000	—	182,668	—	2,682,668
Jolly Roger in the Deep Azure	2007	2,100,000	—	242,603	—	2,342,603
Full Score of Fear	2008	2,000,000	—	116,059	—	2,116,059
The Raven Chaser	2009	2,900,000	325,300	661,550	—	3,886,850
The Lost Ship in the Sky	2010	2,500,000	—	628,423	—	3,128,423
Quarter of Silence	2011	2,500,000	945,900	644,652	—	4,090,552
The Eleventh Striker	2012	2,600,000	—	525,169	531	3,125,700
Private Eye in the Distant Sea	2013	2,900,000	—	—	—	2,900,000
Dimensional Sniper	2014	3,300,000	—	398,761	—	3,698,761
Sunflowers of Inferno	2015	3,400,000	2,808,800	471,319	—	6,680,119
The Darkest Nightmare	2016	4,930,000	1,132,400	522,344	—	6,584,744
Crimson Love Letter	2017	5,350,000	—	450,705	304,000	6,104,705
Zero the Enforcer	2018	6,880,000	4,172,600	419,998	409,777	11,882,375
The Fist of Blue Sapphire	2019	7,260,000	7,440,300	220,631	483,683	15,404,614
The Scarlet Bullet	2021	5,480,000	6,413,200	234,945	312,721	12,440,866
The Bride of Halloween	2022	7,020,000	6,070,500	495,842	529,872	14,116,214
Black Iron Submarine	2023	9,779,013	4,624,850	801,511	794,460	15,999,834
The Million-dollar Pentagram	2024	11,006,971	7,579,404	753,606	926,537	20,266,518
One-eyed Flashback	2025	10,130,578	10,461,171	738,782	786,964	22,117,495
Specials						
Lupin the 3rd vs. Detective Conan	2013	3,550,000	—	225,842	29,329	3,805,171
The Disappearance of Conan Edogawa	2015	—	—	257,381	—	257,381
Episode One	2017	—	—	128,472	61,000	189,472
The Scarlet School Trip	2020	—	—	62,572	103,000	165,572
The Scarlet Alibi	2021	900,000	—	—	79,000	979,000
Kaiju Gomera vs. Kamen Yaiba	2022	—	—	—	19,000	19,000
The Story of Ai Haibara	2023	531,155	—	81,475	57,000	669,630
Detective Conan vs. Kaito Kid	2024	447,549	—	113,720	—	561,269
The Truth From 17 Years Ago	2025	—	—	57,706	—	57,706
Total		118,265,266	60,202,525	10,127,243	4,896,874	193,491,908
