= Detective Conan: The Private Eyes' Requiem =

- Theatrical release poster
- Kanji: 名探偵コナン 探偵たちの鎮魂歌(レクイエム)
- Revised Hepburn: Meitantei Konan: Tantei Tachi no Rekuiemu
- Directed by: Yasuichiro Yamamoto
- Written by: Hiroshi Kashiwabara
- Based on: Case Closed by Gosho Aoyama
- Produced by: Fumio Ueda; Hiroaki Kobayashi; Masahito Yoshioka; Michihiko Suwa; Toshio Nakatani
- Starring: Minami Takayama; Kappei Yamaguchi; Akira Kamiya; Wakana Yamazaki; Ryo Horikawa; Akira Ishida; Megumi Hayashibara; Yuko Miyamura; Kenichi Ogata; Gara Takashima; Yukiko Iwai; Ai Orikasa; Wataru Takagi; Naoko Matsui; Toru Furuya; Fumi Hirano; Aruno Tahara; Atsuko Yuya; Kazuhiko Inoue; Isshin Chiba; Chafurin; Takehiro Koyama; Shinji Ogawa; Akio Ohtsuka; Norio Wakamoto
- Cinematography: Takashi Nomura
- Edited by: Terumitsu Okada
- Music by: Katsuo Ono
- Production company: TMS Entertainment
- Distributed by: Toho
- Release date: April 15, 2006
- Running time: 111 minutes
- Country: Japan
- Language: Japanese
- Box office: ¥ 3.03 billion (US$ 30.7 million)

Detective Conan: The Private Eyes' Requiem (名探偵コナン 探偵たちの鎮魂歌(レクイエム), Meitantei Konan: Tantei Tachi no Rekuiemu) is a 2006 Japanese animated mystery film and the 10th entry in the Case Closed film series released on April 15, 2006. It earned 3.03 billion yen in the box office. The story of the film focuses on Conan Edogawa, Kogoro Mouri and Heiji Hattori, who must solve a mystery and save the hostages Ran, Kazuha Toyama and the Detective Boys from the explosive wristbands that received by the mysterious robber-turned-client.

Detective Conan: The Private Eyes' Requiem is the Detective Conan series' 10th anniversary commemorative work and the third appearance of Kaito Kid within the film series. It is the only film so far where Mitsuhiko Tsuburaya is not voiced by his original voice actress Ikue Ohtani.

== Plot ==
In Yokohama, Conan Edogawa, Kogoro, Ran Mouri, Ayumi Yoshida, Genta Kojima, Mitsuhiko Tsuburaya and Ai Haibara are invited to visit a mysterious client in a hotel named Red Castle beside a theme park called Miracle Land. Ran and the kids leave after being given free theme park wristbands, while Conan and Kogoro are forced by the client to solve a mystery to remove the wristbands, which are set to detonate. The client also reveals that the wristbands given to Ran and company are set to detonate should they leave the premises. The client reveals that two other detectives gave up, one named Ryu killed, while one is still working.

Conan and Kogoro investigate an abandoned hotel where they find ski masks and a gun, which were used for a robbery. On the same date of the robbery, the Kaito Kid stole some jewels from a nearby company. Kogoro retrieves the bag, but ends up getting arrested as Kid's accomplice. During the questioning, the client calls Conan, correctly identifies him as Shinichi Kudo and gives him a second clue. Conan meets Heiji Hattori who reveals that he is also part of the search, with his friend Kazuha Toyama also held captive.

Heiji and Conan work together and end up in Yokohama Oceanic University where they join together with Saguru Hakuba, a famous British-Japanese detective. They find out that one of the former presidents of the club, Nishio Masaharu, was charged with the murder of a classmate. Heiji then confirms with the client through the phone that the mystery he wants them to solve was the murder case. They are attacked by two motorcyclists working for Souichiro Miyama, the art museum owner who is trying to kill Kid. To escape, the three detectives split up, while Conan ends up falling from a bridge and breaks his leg. Meanwhile at Miracle Land, the mugger attempts to take Ayumi hostage when they reaches the entrance, but was backfired by Sonoko Suzuki and Miwako Sato, who was go on a date with Wataru Takagi at the park.

Kogoro is already giving his report to the client in Red Castle when Heiji knocks him out so he does not get killed for giving a wrong conclusion. They then discover the client, later confirmed as Suehiko Ito, who is a blind wheelchair user and reveal the truth to him. Ito, Nishio and Reiko Shimizu, a woman who Ito was in love with, were staging the robbery of an armored truck. The robbery went wrong when a guard was killed and the robbers' escape was then witnessed by Kid. Thus, Nishio was murdered in order to keep the involvement of the other two silent. Conan and Heiji reveal that Nishio was already dead before Ito shot him and that Reiko was the true killer. When Ito panicked and tried to leave the city, his car was sabotaged in an attempt to kill him. Reiko appears at that moment and confirms the truth behind the incident. She attempts to kill the detectives but is knocked out.

Conan accesses the computer to change the settings on the wristbands but fails due to the computer receiving damage from a loose gunshot. Conan manages to deactivate the link but not the restricted area. The watches are then collected by the police except one (Genta) which is not accounted for as the police thought that the number of wristband is correct. They forgot to include the fact that Sonoko is not involved in the case therefore they should include one more in the number of wristband collected. After the police collected the wristbands, all of them went to the snake ride called Super Snake. Genta brought along the wristband for Super Snake. At the start of the ride, Heiji saw the wristband and managed to remove but due to the motion of the ride, the wristband lands on the last seat of the ride. When the ride reaches the sea which is out of the restricted zone, Kid took the wristband and let it explode safely. Conan reveals that Kid was with them for a long time, disguised as Hakuba.

In the post-credits scene, the death of the three previous detectives hired by Ito is revealed to have been staged, resulting Ryu gets arrested in the process. Meanwhile in Tokyo, Kogoro is called for the sleeping pill advertisement while Conan and Heiji witnessing him.

== Cast ==
- Minami Takayama as Conan Edogawa
  - Kappei Yamaguchi as Shinichi Kudo
    - Yamaguchi also voices Kaito Kuroba/Kaito Kid
- Wakana Yamazaki as Ran Mouri
- Akira Kamiya as Kogoro Mouri
- Ryo Horikawa as Heiji Hattori
- Yuko Miyamura as Kazuha Toyama
- Kenichi Ogata as Dr. Hiroshi Agasa
- Megumi Hayashibara as Ai Haibara
- Yukiko Iwai as Ayumi Yoshida
- Ai Orikasa as Mitsuhiko Tsuburaya. Unlike the previous films where he is voiced by Ikue Ohtani, Orikasa voices Mitsuhiko exclusively for this film.
- Wataru Takagi as Genta Kojima and Wataru Takagi
- Naoko Matsui as Sonoko Suzuki
- Chafurin as Juzo Megure
- Kazuhiko Inoue as Ninzaburou Shiratori
- Atsuko Yuya as Miwako Sato
- Isshin Chiba as Kazunobu Chiba
- Takehiro Koyama as Heizo Hattori
- Shinji Ogawa as Ginshiro Toyama
- Akio Ohtsuka as Juugo Yokomizo
- Norio Wakamoto as Officer Ohtaki
- Gara Takashima as Eri Kisaki
- Asako Dodo as Midori Kuriyama
- Unshou Ishizuka as Ginzo Nakamori
- Akira Ishida as Saguru Hakuba, British-Japanese detective who later revealed to be Kid in disguise.
- Kazuko Sugiyama as the fortune teller who predicts Conan's and Heiji's futures
- Masaya Onosaka as the chestnut criminal
- Mitsuo Iwata as the homeless man who witnesses Kid
- Arimasa Ohsawa as the policeman
- Akio Nojima as Souichiro Miyama
- Aruno Tahara as Masao Takada
- Rikiya Koyama as Ryuucha
- Fumi Hirano as Reiko Shimizu
- Toru Furuya as Suehiko Ito, the mysterious robber-turned-client who lives in isolation at Red Castle hotel.

== Music ==
The theme song is "Yuruginaimono Hitotsu" (ゆるぎないものひとつ) by B'z. It was released on April 12, 2006. Along with The Last Wizard of the Century and The Phantom of Baker Street, this is the third Case Closed film theme written by B'z.

The official soundtrack was released on April 12, 2006.

== Home media ==
=== DVD ===
There are two versions of the DVD released, a special version and a regular version, both released on December 13, 2006. The special version contains a disc with the film and trailers, and a bonus disc with all of the film and Detective Conan 10 Years Special Thanks commercials, costing ¥7350. The regular version contains only a disc with the film and trailers, costing ¥6090.

=== Blu-ray ===
The Blu-ray version of the film was released on February 25, 2011. The Blu-ray contains the same content of the DVD plus a mini-booklet explaining the film and the BD-live function.
