= Case Closed: The Darkest Nightmare =

- Theatrical release poster
- Kanji: 名探偵コナン 純黒の悪夢
- Revised Hepburn: Meitantei Konan: Junkoku no Naitomea
- Directed by: Kobun Shizuno
- Screenplay by: Takeharu Sakurai
- Based on: Case Closed by Gosho Aoyama
- Starring: Minami Takayama; Kappei Yamaguchi; Rikiya Koyama; Wakana Yamazaki; Megumi Hayashibara; Yūki Amami; Tōru Furuya; Shuichi Ikeda; Mami Koyama; Kotono Mitsuishi; Kenichi Ogata; Yukiko Iwai; Ikue Ohtani; Wataru Takagi; Kikuko Inoue; Hiroyuki Kinoshita; Yukitoshi Hori; Fumihiko Tachiki
- Music by: Katsuo Ōno
- Production company: TMS/V1 Studio
- Distributed by: Toho
- Release date: April 16, 2016
- Running time: 112 minutes
- Country: Japan
- Language: Japanese
- Box office: ¥6.33 billion (Japan); CN¥31.1 million (China); 522,344 tickets (South Korea)

Case Closed: The Darkest Nightmare, known as Detective Conan: The Darkest Nightmare (名探偵コナン 純黒の悪夢, Meitantei Konan: Junkoku no Naitomea) in Japan, is a 2016 Japanese animated action thriller film. It is the twentieth installment of the Case Closed film series based on the manga series of the same name, following the 2015 film Case Closed: Sunflowers of Inferno. The film was released on April 16, 2016. The theme song for the main film was "Sekai wa Anata no Iro ni Naru" (世界はあなたの色になる) by B'z.

== Plot ==
A Black Organization spy, codenamed Curaçao, infiltrates the NPA Security Bureau Office, stealing the NOC list of MI6, BND, CSIS, FBI and CIA agents working undercover in the Black Organization. Yuya Kazami, an officer of the Public Security Bureau, catches her red handed and Curaçao is forced to run away. Rei Furuya, also known as Bourbon, attempts to stop her from escaping and later engages in a car chase on the Rainbow Bridge, with Akai Shuichi joining later. The car chase ends up causing a havoc, and Akai decides to shoot the tire of Curaçao's vehicle, causing the car to crash and fall off the bridge. Curaçao escapes from the car as it is falling and lands in the water. She later surfaces at Tohto Aquarium near the crash site.

The next day, the Detective Boys discover Curaçao at Tohto Aquarium. She is suffering from amnesia and her phone is broken as a result of the car crash the day prior. Conan retrieves the broken phone and takes photos of Curaçao, sends the photos to Ran, who, in turn, sends them to the Tokyo Metropolitan Police, then hands the phone to Dr. Agasa so he can recover the data on it. The Detective Boys then decide to stay with Curaçao to help her regain her memory. After noticing Curaçao's perfect aiming skills while playing darts and her swift act of saving Genta from falling from high a place, Haibara and Conan notice that Curaçao is not an ordinary woman, and Haibara herself gets a sense that Curaçao is likely to be another Black Organization agent. Meanwhile, Dr. Agasa attempts to recover the message from Curaçao's broken cell phone, and finds out that Curaçao attempted to send the names of known NOC agents (Stout, Aquavit, Riesling, Bourbon/Rei, and Kir/Hidemi Hondo) to the organization. Stout, Aquavit, Riesling are later killed by members of the Black Organization in London, Toronto and Berlin respectively, and Rei and Hidemi are held hostage in Tokyo. Curaçao also screams out the names of those NOC agent in front of the Detective Boys when the ferris wheel they were riding in reaches the top and the various colors she sees triggers a reaction.

The Tokyo Metropolitan Police later come and take Curaçao into custody, transferring her to the Police Hospital, but they are forced to surrender her to the PSB as the Bureau believes Curaçao was the spy infiltrating the Bureau Office the day before. The Bureau becomes aware that Curaçao appears to react to certain events in the Tohto Aquarium, and decides to take her back to the Aquarium. The same night, the Black Organization, who arrived by the Bell Boeing V-22 Osprey, knocks out the electricity for the entire aquarium and plan to intercept Curaçao when the Ferris wheel reaches the top. After Curaçao regains her memory by looking at the specific color patterns of the projected lights like she did earlier before, Yuya Kazami, who boarded the Ferris wheel with her, is knocked unconscious by her and she escapes. The Black Organization attempts to detonate the bomb planted at the Ferris wheel, but the bomb is disarmed by Rei after he is informed of its existence through Conan. The organization then change plans and instead fire from the V-22, trying to kill Curaçao and destabilize the wheel so that it will fall and roll. Akai, with the help of Conan and Rei, are able to shoot down the V-22, and Conan attempts to stop the rolling wheel before it crushes to the aquarium. Curaçao, having noticed that the Detective Boys are in the rolling Ferris wheel, crash a crane truck into the wheel, stopping it and saving the Detective Boys but her actions cause the Ferris wheel to crush her to death. Before her death, Curaçao admits to Vermouth that the mail tampered by Conan and sent from her broken cell phone that reads "Bourbon and Kir are clean" was sent on her own. Thus, the two are able to maintain their cover in the Black Organization.

== Cast ==
Character	Japanese	English
Shinichi Kudo	Kappei Yamaguchi	Griffin Burns
Conan Edogawa	Minami Takayama	Wendee Lee
Ran Mori	Wakana Yamazaki	Cristina Vee
Kogoro Mori	Rikiya Koyama	Xander Mobus
Ai Haibara	Megumi Hayashibara	Erica Mendez
Ayumi Yoshida	Yukiko Iwai	Janice Kawaye
Mitsuhiko Tsuburaya	Ikue Ōtani	Erika Harlacher
Genta Kojima	Wataru Takagi	Andrew Russell
Wataru Takagi	Wataru Takagi	Christopher Bevins
Dr. Hiroshi Agasa	Kenichi Ogata	Michael Sorich
Sonoko Suzuki	Naoko Matsui	Minx Lee
Miwako Sato	Atsuko Yuya	Katelyn Gault
Rei Furuya	Tōru Furuya	Kyle McCarley
Juzo Megure	Chafurin	Jake Eberle
Kazunobu Chiba	Isshin Chiba	Jason C. Miller
James Black	Takaya Hashi	Taylor Henry
André Camel	Kiyoyuki Yanada	Chris Tergliafera
Jodie Starling	Miyuki Ichijo	Maureen Price
Shuichi Akai	Shuichi Ikeda	Keith Silverstein
Azusa Enomoto	Mikiko Enomoto	Janice Kawaye
Rum	Unknown (Note: Rum was only given a computerized altered voice and the film credits doesn't list a voice actor. This was done intentionally so that no one could look up what other characters that voice actor or actress might have played in the anime series and easily figure out Rum's identity. It was revealed in April 2023 that Rum's voice actor is Shigeru Chiba, although it currently remains unclear on whether Chiba himself did voice Rum in the film or if it was done with a computer-generated voice.)	Chris Cason
Gin	Yukitoshi Hori	D. C. Douglas
Vodka	Fumihiko Tachiki	Edward Bosco
Vermouth	Mami Koyama	Laura Post
Chianti	Kikuko Inoue	Tamara Ryan
Korn	Hiroyuki Kinoshita	Kaiji Tang
Kir	Kotono Mitsuishi	Jennifer Losi
Curaçao	Yūki Amami	Allegra Clark
Stout	Michael Rhys	Chris Tergliafera
Aquavit	Kurt Common	Kurt Common
Riesling	Yōko Sōmi	Morgan Berry
Yuya Kazami	Nobuo Tobita	Ray Chase

== Box office ==
The film was number-one in its first weekend with ¥1.209 billion (US$11.1 million) in gross and 934,000 admissions. With ¥5.057 billion (US$47 million) during its first twenty three days in theatres and a total of ¥6.33 billion grossed over its entire run in Japan, it broke the record held by previous film Sunflowers of Inferno, becoming the highest-grossing film in the franchise. Records subsequently broken by Case Closed: The Crimson Love Letter, the next film in the series.

The Darkest Nightmare was released in China on November 25, 2016, and has grossed CN¥31.124 million in the country. In South Korea, the film sold 522,344 tickets.

== Release ==
An English dub, produced by Bang Zoom! Entertainment, was released on December 22, 2020, on Amazon Prime Video, Google Play, iTunes, Microsoft Store, and YouTube. Discotek Media released the film on home video on September 28, 2021.
