= Detective Conan: Magician of the Silver Sky =

- Theatrical release poster
- Kanji: 名探偵コナン 銀翼の奇術師(マジシャン)
- Revised Hepburn: Meitantei Konan: Gin Yoku no Majishan
- Directed by: Yasuichiro Yamamoto
- Written by: Kazunari Kouchi
- Based on: Case Closed by Gosho Aoyama
- Produced by: Michihiko Suwa
- Starring: Minami Takayama; Kappei Yamaguchi; Akira Kamiya; Wakana Yamazaki; Megumi Hayashibara; Gara Takashima; Naoko Matsui; Yukiko Iwai; Ikue Ohtani; Wataru Takagi; Chafurin
- Cinematography: Takashi Nomura
- Edited by: Terumitsu Okada
- Music by: Katsuo Ono
- Production company: TMS Entertainment
- Distributed by: Toho
- Release date: April 17, 2004
- Running time: 108 minutes
- Country: Japan
- Language: Japanese
- Box office: ¥2.8 billion (US$ 28.4 million)

Detective Conan: Magician of the Silver Sky (名探偵コナン 銀翼の奇術師(マジシャン), Meitantei Konan: Gin Yoku no Majishan) is the 2004 Japanese animated mystery disaster film and the 8th Case Closed feature film. The film was released in Japan on April 17, 2004. A Region 2 DVD has been released by Universal Pictures. The film brought a box office income of 2.8 billion yen.

== Plot ==
A Japanese-American stage actress named Julie Maki wants to use her star sapphire for her upcoming play Kaiserin Josephine and asks for Kogoro Mouri's help to protect it after showing Kogoro a letter from the Kaito Kid. On the day of the theft, Kid appears at the newly opened Sora Theatre disguised up as Shinichi Kudo but ends up fleeing from Conan Edogawa in the end without the jewel during the glider battle.

To thank them, Julie invites Kogoro and everyone to Hakodate, and they all travel on Sky Japan Airlines plane (specifically a Boeing 747-400) to get there. After the takeoff from Haneda Airport, one of the show actors, Isao Shinjo, who was supposed to be elsewhere and Ran's mother, Eri Kisaki, joins them on the plane. As the plane takes off, Julie comes in physical contact with most of the individuals she invited and later mysteriously dies from poisoning after eating one of chocolates, making them all suspects in the case of her death. When Kogoro wrongfully accuses the show's actress Tenko Tajima as the killer, Conan accidentally tranquilizes Eri when he targeted Kogoro during the storm and uses her voice to solve the case, and the true killer was later found to be Julie's personal makeup artist, Natsuki Sakai.

During the flight, the captains were also poisoned from Natsuki's poisonous makeup contacted from Julie's skin and were not able to pilot the plane, so Shinjo agrees to take over because he supposedly "took courses", and appoints Conan to assist him. Conan figures out that "Shinjo" is Kid in disguise when Conan is asked to assist while the real Shinjo getting chased by the policemen led by Ginzo Nakamori, who mistaken the real Shinjo as Kid, as this logic would not apply in a similar situation. Kid tells Conan that he is no longer interested in the sapphire as he discovered that it was a fake. However, the storm and fire at the Hakodate Airport make it impossible to land while the plane fuel is running low. Conan picks a stable area that can support a commercial plane. Ran and Sonoko Suzuki eventually take over piloting the plane while Kid escapes by jumping off the plane and Conan has to "go to the bathroom."

Conan then switches over to Shinichi's voice and guides Ran for landing the plane. During the flight, Ran mentions how Shinichi is like an eclipse; one moment he's there, the other he's not. When the plane lands, Ran tells Shinichi that she loves him, but ends the moment by telling him that she suddenly sees lights at the site. It turns out that Kid went near a police station and used police cars (because Nakamori is obsessed with catching him) as guiding lights to land the plane at Muroran. After the plane safely lands at the harbor, Natsuki is apprehended and Ran and Sonoko are treated by a medic, who later revealed to be Kid in disguise.

In the post-credits scene, Kid commends Ran for landing the plane safely and tells her they will meet again before suddenly vanishing. All went well, Ran talking to Conan, using Shinichi's voice again, over the phone again arguing about silly things, thinking that it was Kid who guided her to land the plane, and is relieved that her secret isn't out.

== Cast ==
- Minami Takayama as Conan Edogawa
  - Kappei Yamaguchi as Shinichi Kudo (himself and Kid's disguise)
    - Yamaguchi also voices Kaito Kuroba/Kaito Kid
- Akira Kamiya as Kogoro Mouri
- Wakana Yamazaki as Ran Mouri
- Kenichi Ogata as Dr. Hiroshi Agasa
- Chafurin as Juzo Megure
- Kazuhiko Inoue as Ninzaburo Shiratori
- Ikue Ohtani as Mitsuhiko Tsuburaya
- Megumi Hayashibara as Ai Haibara
- Naoko Matsui as Sonoko Suzuki
- Wataru Takagi as Genta Kojima and Wataru Takagi
- Yukiko Iwai as Ayumi Yoshida
- Unshō Ishizuka as Ginzo Nakamori
- Gara Takashima as Eri Kisaki

== Music ==
The theme song is "Dream x Dream" which plays during the credits was written and performed by Rina Aiuchi. It was released April 28, 2004.

The official soundtrack is released on April 4, 2004. It costs ¥3059, including tax.

== Home media ==
=== DVD ===
The DVD was released on December 15, 2004. It contains the film and the trailer and costs ¥6090 with tax included.

=== Blu-ray ===
The Blu-ray version of the film was released on December 24, 2010. The Blu-ray contains the same content of the DVD plus a mini-booklet explaining the film.

== Box office ==
- Opening Weekend: $3,716,785 (Japan, 285 Theaters)
- Total: ¥2,800,000,000 / $27,000,000 (Japan, Rough Figure)
