= Yasuichiro Yamamoto =

Japanese anime director and storyboard artist

Yasuichiro Yamamoto 山本 泰一郎
- Born: January 6, 1961 (age 65); Chigasaki, Kanagawa, Japan
- Education: University of Santo Tomas
- Occupations: Anime film director Storyboard artist
- Years active: 1980–present

Yasuichiro Yamamoto (山本 泰一郎, Yamamoto Yasuichiro) is a Japanese anime director, and storyboard artist. He is best known for directing the majority of Detective Conan.

== Works ==
- Space Adventure Cobra: The Movie (1982 Film), Animation
- Urusei Yatsura: Only You (1983 Film), Assistant Animator, In between Artist
- Once Upon a Time [Windaria] (1986 Film), Key Animation
- Project A-Ko 4: Final (1989 OVA), Animation
- Mischievous Twins: The Tales of St. Clare's (1991 TV series), Episode Director
- Detective Conan (1996 TV series), Director, Storyboard, Episode Director
- Detective Conan: The Time Bombed Skyscraper (1997 Film), Key Animation, Sub-Character Design
- Detective Conan: The Fourteenth Target (1998 Film), Key Animation
- Detective Conan: The Last Magician of the Century (1999 Film), Director
- Hamtaro (2000 TV series), Storyboard
- Detective Conan: Conan vs Kid vs Yaiba (2001 OVA), Director, Storyboard
- Detective Conan: 16 Suspects (2002 OVA), Director, Storyboard
- Detective Conan: Conan and Heiji and the Vanished Boy (2003 OVA), Director, Storyboard
- Detective Conan: Magician of the Silver Sky (2004 Film), Director
- Detective Conan: Strategy Above the Depths (2005 Film), Director, Storyboard
- Kamichu! (2005 TV series), Storyboard (ep 12), Key Animation (ep 12)
- Detective Conan: The Private Eyes' Requiem (2006 Film), Director
- Detective Conan: A Challenge from Agasa (2007 OVA), Director, Storyboard
- Detective Conan: Jolly Roger in the Deep Azure (2007 Film), Director, Storyboard
- Itazura na Kiss (2008 TV series), Storyboard (ep 20)
- Detective Conan: Full Score of Fear (2008 Film), Director, Storyboard
- Detective Conan: The Raven Chaser (2009 Film), Director
- The Lost Ship In The Sky (2010 Film), Director
- Quarter of Silence (2011 Film), Director
- The Eleventh Striker (2012 Film), Director
- Private Eye in the Distant Sea (2013 Film)
- Dimensional Sniper (2014 Film)
- Sunflowers of Inferno (2015 Film)
