= Lupin the 3rd vs. Detective Conan: The Movie =

Lupin III vs. Detective Conan: The Movie
- North American DVD cover

Japanese name
- Kanji: ルパン三世VS名探偵コナン THE MOVIE
Transcriptions
- Revised Hepburn: Rupan Sansei Vāsasu Meitantei Konan Za Mūbī
- Directed by: Hajime Kamegaki
- Screenplay by: Atsushi Maekawa
- Based on: Lupin the Third by Monkey Punch and Detective Conan by Gosho Aoyama
- Produced by: Takuya Itō; Naoki Iwasa; Takeshi Yamakawa; Yoshihito Yonekura
- Starring: Minami Takayama; Kappei Yamaguchi; Rikiya Koyama; Wakana Yamazaki; Megumi Hayashibara; Kanichi Kurita; Kiyoshi Kobayashi; Daisuke Namikawa; Miyuki Sawashiro; Kōichi Yamadera; Naoko Matsui; Yukiko Iwai; Ikue Ohtani; Wataru Takagi; Kenichi Ogata; Chafurin
- Cinematography: Tatsuo Noguchi
- Edited by: Terumitsu Okada
- Music by: Yuji Ohno; Katsuo Ōno
- Production companies: TMS Entertainment; Daburu Iguru
- Distributed by: Toho
- Release date: December 7, 2013
- Running time: 107 minutes
- Country: Japan
- Language: Japanese
- Box office: $41.3 million

Lupin III vs. Detective Conan: The Movie (Japanese: ルパン三世VS名探偵コナン The Movie, Hepburn: Rupan Sansei Vāsasu Meitantei Konan Za Mūbī) is a 2013 Japanese animated action comedy film directed by Hajime Kamegaki. It is the second crossover between the Lupin III and Detective Conan characters following the television special Lupin III vs. Detective Conan (2009). Incorporating various elements from its predecessor, the story follows Conan Edogawa who sets out to apprehend Lupin III, the suspect of stealing a jewel called the Cherry Sapphire.

Lupin III vs. Detective Conan: The Movie was theatrically released in Japan on December 7, 2013, by Toho. It was nominated for the Japan Academy Prize for Animation of the Year. Discotek Media released the film in the United States on Blu-ray on December 1, 2021.

== Plot ==
Kaito Kid steals a fabulous diamond, but uses several techniques that differ from his traditional methods. Conan Edogawa pursues him, but is foiled by a shadowy figure using a sword to slice his skateboard in two; only then does he realize the true identity of the culprit: Lupin III. As it turns out, Lupin acts under coercion; his love interest, Fujiko Mine, is being used as a hostage, with an explosive collar around her neck which will detonate if Lupin does not cooperate. The theft of the diamond, which Lupin discards shortly afterwards, was nothing more than a test of his abilities, as his real target is a gemstone named the Cherry Sapphire his "employer", a mystery man calling himself Alan Smithee, is after. Mystified by Lupin's behavior, the Tokyo Police under Inspector Megure consults Lupin's would-be-nemesis Inspector Koichi Zenigata, with Miwako Sato and Wataru Takagi volunteering as assistants. However, despite Zenigata's precautions, Lupin, disguised as Takagi, manages to steal the gem and get away.

Simultaneously, Italian pop singer Emilio Baretti arrives in Japan to conduct a concert tour; but amidst the news coverage Conan notices Daisuke Jigen among Baretti's entourage. Ran Mouri's friend Sonoko Suzuki arranges for a pre-concert meeting with her idol in his hotel, but upon arrival they stumble upon Megure and the police in Baretti's suite, along with his manager, Claudia Belucci, and his producer, Luciano Carnevale. Baretti has received a threatening letter ordering him to cancel his concert or be killed. Despite the danger to Baretti's life, Carnevale insists that the concert take place as scheduled. When Ran and Sonoko decide to leave, Conan stays behind to look for Jigen, whom he finds acting as Baretti's bodyguard, although he evidently pursues yet another agenda.

In the meantime, Ran and Sonoko are suddenly joined by Baretti for a clandestine tour of Tokyo Skytree. Once there, he climbs to a high rampant in a desperate attempt to see the concert cancelled; when Ran finds him there, she begins reprimanding him, thinking he wants to commit suicide. A wind blast nearly blows them both off the tower, but they are saved by the combined efforts of Conan, Jigen and Sonoko. Chastised, Baretti confesses that Carnevale, who is affiliated with the Italian Mafia, uses his concerts as a cover to conduct illegal dealings, and therefore Baretti made up the threat to his life in order to have the Japan concert, an anacrusis for yet another deal, called off.

Eventually, Baretti's concert starts as scheduled. However, Carnevale manages to evade police surveillance and make his way to Haneda Airport, where he meets with Smithee to conduct the deal. However, it is revealed at this point that the middleman who arranged this meeting and the owner of the Cherry Sapphire were Jigen and Goemon Ishikawa; Lupin has been in fact hired by the Vespanian government to retrieve a rare piece of ore stolen by Carnevale, a mineral which enables the construction of ultimate stealth technology. Smithee, a native from the (fictional) country of Gillanba, intended to use the ore to offset the military might of a neighboring country, a purpose neither the late queen of Vespania, Sakura, nor her daughter and successor Mira have been endorsing.

However, Smithee has brought heavily armed reinforcements, and despite the help of most of Conan and Lupin's friends, Smithee finds an opening which enables him to take Conan as a hostage. Smithee and Carnevale attempt to escape by plane, but Lupin boards the craft, and he and Conan prepare to take down Smithee for good. Carnevale arrives and wildly fires a minigun at them, damaging the flight controls, mortally wounding Smithee and puncturing the hull, causing himself to be sucked out by the sudden decompression. When military jets attack, intending to destroy the ore samples before they can leave the country, Lupin reveals that the Cherry Sapphire is also made from a piece of Vespanian ore. After using it successfully to thwart the missiles shot at them, Conan and Lupin abandon the crashing plane via parachute and are subsequently picked up by a submarine temporarily appropriated by Fujiko and Ai Haibara. In a post-credit scene, Conan, Ran and Haibara see Baretti off safely as he departs Japan. Lupin, in the meantime, tries to steal a national treasure from a Kansai temple, only to find Kaito Kid having already beaten him to it and alerted the police as payback for dressing up as him.

== Cast ==
Character	Japanese voice actor	English dub actor
Lupin III	Kanichi Kurita	Tony Oliver
Conan Edogawa	Minami Takayama	Wendee Lee
Ran Mouri	Wakana Yamazaki	Cristina Vee
Kogoro Mouri	Rikiya Koyama	Xander Mobus
Daisuke Jigen	Kiyoshi Kobayashi	Richard Epcar
Goemon Ishikawa	Daisuke Namikawa	Lex Lang
Fujiko Mine	Miyuki Sawashiro	Michelle Ruff
Inspector Zenigata	Kōichi Yamadera	Doug Erholtz
Kid the Phantom Thief	Kappei Yamaguchi	Griffin Burns
Ai Haibara	Megumi Hayashibara	Erica Mendez
Ayumi Yoshida	Yukiko Iwai	Janice Kawaye
Mitsuhiko Tsuburaya	Ikue Ōtani	Erika Harlacher
Genta Kojima	Wataru Takagi	Andrew Russell
Sonoko Suzuki	Naoko Matsui	Jennie Kwan
Hiroshi Agasa	Kenichi Ogata	Michael Sorich
James Black	Iemasa Kayumi	Jamieson Price
Inspector Shiratori	Kazuhiko Inoue	Greg Chun
Miwako Sato	Atsuko Yuya	Katelyn Gault
Inspector Nakamori	Unshō Ishizuka	Kirk Thornton
King	Kazuyoshi Miura	Kirk Thornton
Miike	Rie Tanaka	Anairis Quinones
Miyamoto	Yū Sugimoto	Amanda Lee
Keith Dan Stinger	Hikaru Midorikawa	Daman Mills
Emilio Baretti	Miyu Irino	Darrel Delfin
Luciano Carnevale	Tetsuo Kanao	Brock Powell
Vault Manager	Jōji Yanami	John Estanislau
Inspector Megure	Chafurin	Jake Eberle
Claudia Bellucci	Natsuna	Dawn M. Bennett
Alan Smithee	Seiyo Uchino	J. Michael Tatum

== Release ==
The movie was released by VAP on Blu-ray and two DVD editions in Japan on June 14, 2014. During the week of release the deluxe DVD edition sold more than 11,000 copies and the regular edition sold over 8,000 copies to rank second and third respectively on the animation DVD chart. The Blu-ray sold over 10,000 copies to rank #3 on the animation Blu-ray chart.

The movie was broadcast on NTV on January 30, 2015, and achieved a 14.9% audience share.

A subtitled version of the movie began streaming on the Hulu video service in North America in January 2015. Discotek Media released the film on DVD in North America on October 27, 2015, with English subs and released the film on Blu-ray on November 30, 2021, with an English dub.

The song "Wonderland" by Japanese rock band 99RadioService is featured as an insert song in the movie. A music video for the song that features clips from the Lupin III vs. Detective Conan: The Movie was available between January 9 and March 31, 2014.

== Reception ==
=== Critical ===
The film was nominated for the Japan Academy Prize for Animation of the Year at the 37th Japan Academy Prize.

Lupin expert Reed Nelson, in writing a feature titled Lupin the Third: The Complete Guide to Films, TV Specials and OVAs for Anime News Network, felt that Lupin the 3rd vs. Detective Conan: The Movie was not an element of the Lupin franchise that was worth viewing, describing the film as follows: "Subject to a downfall of many of Lupin's worst features, the runtime is far too long for the story, which naturally leads to too much talking and not much doing. However, Case Closed fans may indulge themselves in the abundant franchise in-jokes".

=== Box office ===
Lupin the 3rd vs. Detective Conan: The Movie earned around US$6,288,900 at the Japanese box office in its first two days. This number increased to US$13,897,390 by December 15, 2013. The film earned ¥3.59 billion (US$34.4 million) in the month after being released. By January 7, 2014, the film had grossed ¥3.63 billion (US$34.7 million) and became the highest grossing Detective Conan film. By January 19, it had grossed ¥4 billion (US$38.29 million). By 2 February, the film had grossed ¥4,061,257,975 (US$39,694,735) at the Japanese box office.

The film grossed a total of ¥4.26 billion ($43,649,483) in Japan. Overseas, the film grossed $1,561,945 in South Korea, Thailand, Singapore, and Hong Kong, for a total of $45,211,428 in Asia.
