= Case Closed: Sunflowers of Inferno =

- Theatrical release poster
- Kanji: 名探偵コナン 業火の向日葵
- Revised Hepburn: Meitantei Konan: Gōka no Himawari
- Directed by: Kobun Shizuno
- Written by: Takeharu Sakurai
- Based on: Case Closed by Gosho Aoyama
- Starring: Minami Takayama; Kappei Yamaguchi; Rikiya Koyama; Wakana Yamazaki; Naoko Matsui; Megumi Hayashibara; Kōsei Tomita; Unshou Ishizuka; Shunsuke Sakuya; Taiten Kusunoki; Nana Eikura; Hiroshi Isobe; Yukana; Yoshiko Sakakibara; Toshiko Sawada; Michio Hazama
- Music by: Katsuo Ono
- Production company: TMS/V1 Studio
- Distributed by: Toho
- Release date: April 18, 2015
- Running time: 112 minutes
- Country: Japan
- Language: Japanese
- Box office: $52.9 million

Case Closed: Sunflowers of Inferno, known as Detective Conan: Sunflowers of Inferno (名探偵コナン 業火の向日葵, Meitantei Konan: Gōka no Himawari) in Japan, is a 2015 Japanese anime film directed by Kobun Shizuno and is the nineteenth installment of the film series based on the Case Closed anime and manga series. It was released on April 18, 2015.

== Plot ==
At an exclusive auction house in New York City, Vincent van Gogh's Sunflowers, which was believed to be destroyed by a US air raid of World War II, was put up for auction. Jirokichi Suzuki, accompanied by his niece, Sonoko won the auction with a $300 million bid. At a press conference, Suzuki announces his plan to gather all seven Van Gogh's Sunflowers paintings around the world for a grand exhibition. The venue would be a purpose-built gallery in a cliff in Japan known as "Lake Rock", with the highest security and protection. Suzuki also announces the engagement of seven specialists, whom he called the "Seven Samurai", to oversee the exhibition and protect the Sunflowers:

1. Keiko Anderson, a painting exhibition planning professional;
2. Natsumi Miyadai, a painting history professional;
3. Koji Azuma, a painting restoration and preservation professional;
4. Kumiko Kishi, a painting exhibition professional;
5. Taizo Ishimine, a painting transportation professional;
6. Charlie, a New York Police Department professional engaged to safeguard the painting out of New York;
7. Kogoro Mori, a Tokyo private detective engaged to protect the painting in Japan.

During the press conference, Kaito Kid announced his presence by throwing his card onto the platform before escaping the building. While escaping, he used a flashbang, blinding his pursuers, including Inspector Charlie. Shinichi Kudo appeared after Kid's escape and offered his assistance to escort the Sunflowers.

During transportation of the Sunflowers by Suzuki's cargo plane to Japan, a bomb blew out the door of the cargo compartment, sending the Sunflowers out into the sky. Shinichi jumps off the plane and was revealed to be Kid in disguise and saved the painting. Conan, who was waiting at the airport, spotted Kid and followed him when he descended. The painting was found to be abandoned by Kid, discovered by Conan and was retrieved unharmed. The plane landed safely with no casualties.

A Kid card was sent to Mori, declaring of intention to steal another Sunflowers which is currently exhibited in a Japan art gallery. Conan and friends went to the art gallery where Ai Haibara spoke to an old woman who came to the art gallery every day to see the Sunflowers. While transporting the Sunflowers to the Lake Rock gallery, Conan noted a Kid card with the painting, indicating the painting was already taken. Natsumi examined the painting but was unable to determine the painting's authenticity and asks to take the painting to her studio for further examination. Kid appears and steals the painting and was chased by Conan and Charlie but successfully escaped. With a new note, Kid demands ¥10 billion in cash as a ransom for the second painting within the next two hours, and Suzuki accepts.

The money, in cash, is placed in an isolated room in a hotel with only the art gallery's director present. Conan finds that the pressure in the room was increasing, as the water level in a bottle in the room increased, even though the director had drunk from it. Conan and Charlie storm the room and Kid appears outside the room's window. Kid escaped after Charlie shot at him and the escape was witnessed by the media who were contacted by Kid earlier. Suzuki announces the Sunflowers exhibition will continue even though he was threatened with another Kid card and phosphine, a colorless gas which forms explosive mixtures with air, and may also self-ignite.

On the day of the exhibition, Kid once more impersonates Shinichi, and attends the exhibition. He leaves another Kid card with an enigmatic message which was found by Conan. Deciding to capture Kid, Suzuki orders the gallery be evacuated and locked down while Charlie pursues Kid. The "seven samurais" believed it to be related to the Sunflowers but Conan believed it referred to the Last Supper and its betrayer and that Kid was indicating a traitor among themselves. Nakamori requested a background check on the Seven Samurai again. Suddenly, the power system fails and a fire breaks out. Nakamori identifies that Koichi Azuma, twin brother of Koji, was killed after the discovery of the recovered Sunflowers. Azuma confesses to killing his brother but denies being the culprit in stealing the Sunflowers. While everyone was evacuated from the gallery, two paintings were stuck and not sent to its secure vault for lockdown. Kid remained in the gallery and saved one of the two paintings. Conan returned to the gallery and helped Kid to rescue the remaining Sunflowers. With Ran's help, who had returned to the gallery to look for Conan, they managed to free the painting and sent it back to the vault. The gallery then collapse around them.

Kid detonates a bomb which breaks the water tank and douses the fire but Ran is knocked unconscious. While searching for Kid's planned escape route, Kid tells Conan that he was aware of the culprit's plans to destroy the paintings. Conan, using Shinichi's voice, then contacts everyone and concluded that Natsumi Miyadai is the true culprit. He reveals that Kid was aware of the culprit and was constantly thwarting her plans. In New York, Kid caused chaos to tighten the security of the paintings, preventing Natsumi to carry her plans. Kid impersonated Shinichi to escort the painting. Natsumi had bribed a plane crew to set off a bomb in the plane to destroy the painting but was saved by Kid. Knowing Natsumi was also targeting the fifth painting, Kid sent out a theft notice to once more tighten the security. Natsumi planted a fake Kid card to perform a re-examination of the painting, intending to destroy it elsewhere. Kid was forced to steal it to prevent it. Natsumi then attempted to use phosphine to kill Suzuki, blaming Kid for it, to halt the exhibition and destroy the paintings later. She also suggested to put fake sunflowers along the gallery in order to pour turpentine along the sunflowers trenches, acting as incendiary. Natsumi admitted she was the culprit, wanting to destroy the two paintings as she believed that they were fake and does not deserve to be exhibited.

Due to the collapsing gallery and cliff, Kid is only able to carry Ran and fly to escape, leaving Conan behind. Kid left Ran safely on the hillside and then disappeared. Conan attempted to escape via the Sunflowers tunnel but was trapped due to the painting being stuck in the tunnel. Realising he was under the lake by the cliff, Conan used his explosive football to trigger pressure difference in the tunnel, and using the protective frame of the Sunflowers as a shield, to break the tunnel and be flushed out. Conan was subsequently rescued by Mori when he floated to the surface of the lake with the painting.

While waiting for Conan to appear from the gallery, Kid is cornered by Charlie. Kid tells Charlie that Natsumi anonymously attempted to steal the paintings for her. Kid identified her by her voice and decided to prevent her theft himself. Kid told Charlie that the Sunflowers was rescued by Konosuke Jii, his butler and assistant, during the US air raid in Japan during World War II, who was entrusted by Azuma's grandfather to rescue the lady and the painting. Jii, who loved the lady, requested Kid to save the painting to show it to her again. The woman is revealed to be the old lady which Haibara talked to in the art gallery. Moved by the story, Charlie let Kid go. Kid reciprocated Charlie's respect and disappeared.

== Cast ==
| Character | Japanese | English |
|---|---|---|
| Conan Edogawa | Minami Takayama | Wendee Lee |
| Shin'ichi Kudō | Kappei Yamaguchi | Griffin Burns |
| Kaito Kid | Kappei Yamaguchi | Griffin Burns |
| Ran Mōri | Wakana Yamazaki | Cristina Vee |
| Kogorō Mōri | Rikiya Koyama | Xander Mobus |
| Ai Haibara | Megumi Hayashibara | Erica Mendez |
| Sonoko Suzuki | Naoko Matsui | Minx Lee |
| Ayumi Yoshida | Yukiko Iwai | Janice Kawaye |
| Mitsuhiko Tsuburaya | Ikue Ōtani | Erika Harlacher |
| Genta Kojima | Wataru Takagi | Andrew Russell |
| Wataru Takagi | Wataru Takagi | Christopher Bevins |
| Kamen Yaiba | Wataru Takagi | Zachary T. Rice |
| Hiroshi Agasa | Kenichi Ogata | Michael Sorich |
| Juzo Megure | Chafurin | Jake Eberle |
| Ginzo Nakamori | Unshou Ishizuka | Kirk Thornton |
| Konosuke Jii | Michio Hazama Akio Suyama^{Y} | Frank Todaro Landon McDonald^{Y} |
| Jirokichi Suzuki | Kōsei Tomita | Roy Wolfe |
| Zengo Gotō | Taiten Kusunoki | Paul St. Peter |
| Natsumi Miyadai | Nana Eikura | Kira Buckland |
| Kōji Azuma | Hiroshi Isobe | Ben Lepley |
| Keiko Anderson | Yoshiko Sakakibara | Dorah Fine |
| Kumiko Kishi | Yukana | Lauren Landa |
| Taizō Ishimine | Katsuhisa Hōki | |
| Charlie | Shunsuke Sakuya | Armen Taylor |
| Umeno | Toshiko Sawada Yūko Minaguchi^{Y} | Faye Mata^{Y} |
| Kiyosuke Azuma | Tōru Ōkawa | Kyle Hebert |
| Hideo Haraguchi | Hidekatsu Shibata | Paul Stewart |

== Release ==
The film was released in the Philippines on July 22, 2015, announced by SM Cinema on Facebook. It was released in Singapore on July 20, 2015, in Indonesia on August 5, 2015, and in the United States on January 19, 2021.

Discotek Media licensed the film for home video in North America. The Blu-ray was released on January 25, 2022.

=== Box office ===
It was by far the highest grossing Case Closed film with most tickets sold by August 2015. It was the fourth highest-grossing Japanese film at the Japanese box office in 2015, with ¥4.48 billion (US$37.2 million).

The film was number-four on its opening weekend in China, grossing US$9.06 million. It earned US$12.5 million by its second weekend.
