= Detective Conan: The Million-dollar Pentagram =

Detective Conan: The Million-Dollar Pentagram
- Theatrical release poster
- Kana: 名探偵コナン 100万ドルの五稜星
Transcriptions
- Revised Hepburn: Meitantei Konan Hyakuman Doru no Michishirube
- Directed by: Chika Nagaoka
- Screenplay by: Takahiro Okura
- Based on: Case Closed by Gosho Aoyama
- Produced by: Shūhō Kondō; Takeshi Shioguchi; Yūhei Okada
- Starring: Minami Takayama; Kappei Yamaguchi; Wakana Yamazaki; Rikiya Koyama; Ryō Horikawa; Yuko Miyamura; Megumi Hayashibara; Satsuki Yukino; Daisuke Ono; Koji Yusa; Koji Ishii; Mao Ichimichi; Yo Oizumi
- Music by: Yugo Kanno
- Production company: TMS/1st Studio
- Distributed by: Toho
- Release date: April 12, 2024
- Running time: 110 minutes
- Country: Japan
- Language: Japanese
- Box office: $150 million

Detective Conan: The Million-Dollar Pentagram (Note: Some news outlets initially reported the English title as Detective Conan: The Million Dollar Signpost.) (Japanese: 名探偵コナン 100万ドルの五稜星, Hepburn: Meitantei Konan Hyakuman Doru no Michishirube) is a 2024 Japanese animated mystery film directed by Chika Nagaoka. It is the twenty-seventh installment of the Case Closed film series based on the manga series of the same name by Gosho Aoyama, following the 2023 film Black Iron Submarine. The film was released in Japan on April 12, 2024.

The film grossed ¥15.80 billion in Japan and over $150 million worldwide, making it the highest-grossing Japanese film of 2024, the 18th highest-grossing Japanese film and the 15th highest-grossing film released in Japan. It was also the highest-grossing Case Closed film of all time in Japan. It was the first film of the franchise to land UK and Irish theatrical distribution, as Detective Conan rather than Case Closed, released by Trinity CineAsia with dual English and Chinese subtitles. The next installment, One-eyed Flashback, was released in 2025.

== Plot ==
The current head of the Onoe Zaibatsu, Takuzo Onoe, receives a notice that Kid the Phantom Thief will steal two wakizashi swords belonging to Toshizo Hijikata located in a warehouse in Hakodate, Hokkaido. At the same time, Heiji Hattori is at Hakodate for a kendo tournament, along with his childhood friend Kazuha Toyama, Conan Edogawa and the Mouri family. Kid's plan to steal the swords was intercepted by Heiji, but Kid manages to escape with one of the swords.

The next day, at the tournament venue, Kazuha encounters Hijiri Fukushiro, a university student who planned to perform tameshigiri on stage during the tournament. Meanwhile, Momiji Ooka, Kazuha's love rival, also visits Hokkaido by helicopter to support Heiji's kendo match, but later decided to thwart his plan to confess to Kazuha. In the same day, a man, identified as Sumito Hisagaki, a legal advisor to the Onoe Zaibatsu, was found dead with a cross-shaped wound on his chest near the Hakodate warehouse district.A golf bag that he carried has its contents removed.

Conan and Heiji suspect that Kid is connected to the previous heist at the warehouse, and they speculate that the sword was likely in the golf bag. In addition, Detective Yoshihisa Kawazoe, a subordinate of Inspector Nishimura of the Hokkaido Police Department, revealed that the stolen swords were a clue to the treasure that Keizaburo Onoe, the first head of the Onoe Zaibatsu, had hidden in Hakodate. Police investigations revealed Brian D. Kadokura, an arms dealer throughout Asia, as a suspect. The police revealed that Kadokura's real motive for visiting Japan was to find the treasure left by Keizaburo Onoe after his death.

Later, Kid stole Kadokura's swords while disguising as Nakamori. While hiding, Kid is ambushed by a masked swordsman. Conan and Heiji arrived to fend off the attacker. Kid discloses his motive for stealing the swords and his knowledge about them before leaving the swords to Conan and Heiji. The duo later headed to Ryoe Fukushiro's house. While at the residence, Takuzo Onoe was hit by a truck and is hospitalized.

At the police station, Conan and Heiji deduced that in addition to the six swords by Eitatsu Higashikubo, there exists another sword with a star-shaped tsuba located in Hokkaidō Tōshō-gū. A chase for the sword ensues between Kadokura, Takuzo (who eavesdropped on the deduction), Kid, and Conan and Heiji. The chase ends with Takuzo being arrested and Hijiri detained on allegations of killing Hisagaki.

== Cast ==
Character	Japanese	English
Conan Edogawa	Minami Takayama	Molly Zhang
Shinichi Kudō	Kappei Yamaguchi	Mauricio Ortiz-Segura
Kaito Kid (Kaito Kuroba)	Kappei Yamaguchi	Mauricio Ortiz-Segura
Ran Mōri	Wakana Yamazaki	Megan Shipman
Kogorō Mōri	Rikiya Koyama	Robert McCollum
Heiji Hattori	Ryō Horikawa	Nazeeh Tarsha
Kazuha Toyama	Yuko Miyamura	Raina Meginley
Ai Haibara	Megumi Hayashibara	Alexis Tipton
Ayumi Yoshida	Yukiko Iwai	Abigail Blythe
Mitsuhiko Tsuburaya	Ikue Ōtani	Brittney Karbowski
Genta Kojima	Wataru Takagi	Bryson Baugus
Hiroshi Agasa	Kenichi Ogata	Christopher Guerrero
Sonoko Suzuki	Naoko Matsui	Bree Han
Momiji Ooka	Satsuki Yukino	Marisa Duran
Muga Iori	Daisuke Ono	Jacob Browning
Soshi Okita VI	Koji Yusa	Joshua Waters
Ginzo Nakamori	Koji Ishii	T.J. Anthony
Aoko Nakamori	Mao Ichimichi	Jill Harris
Yusaku Kudo	Hideyuki Tanaka	Tom Henry
Yukiko Kudo	Sumi Shimamoto	Jad Saxton
Toichi Kuroba	Shūichi Ikeda	TBA
Toshizo Hijikata	Kenjiro Tsuda	Brent Mukai
Takeshi Onimaru	Kenjiro Tsuda	Brent Mukai
Detective Yoshihisa Kawazoe	Yo Oizumi	Aaron Roberts
Inspector Kyohei Nishimura	Hikaru Hanada	Tyson Rinehart
Hijiri Fukushiro	Yoshitsugu Matsuoka	Aaron Dismuke
Ryōe Fukushiro	Takayuki Sugō	Bruce DuBose
Takuzō Onoe	Hiroshi Naka	Barry Yandell
Miko Yoshinaga	Marika Kōno	Leah Clark
Brian D. Kadokura	Banjō Ginga and Julian McFarlane (English Stunt)	Chris Rager
Shotoku Machida	Nobuaki Kanemitsu	Stephen E. Moellering
Nacho Belga	Koji Takeda	Rudy Lopez
Afro	Takahiro Miyamoto	Corey Wilder

== Promotion ==
On September 30, 2023, the official Detective Conan film series X (formerly Twitter) account posted an initial trailer for the movie.

On November 29, 2023, in the first issue of 2024 for Weekly Shōnen Sunday, the title of the movie was confirmed as The Million Dollar Pentagram, with a hand-drawn poster by Gosho Aoyama and a synopsis of the film attached, with the release date confirmed as April 12, 2024.

On December 26, 2023, a new 60-second trailer and a visual poster featuring Conan, Heiji, and Kaito Kid were released.

On February 1, 2024, the main visual for the film was released. It was also announced that there was no pre-screening of the film, but a fan meeting was held ahead of the theatrical release of the film. The theme song was revealed to be Sōshi Sōai (Japanese: 相思相愛) by Aiko in a 90-second trailer released on February 15, marking the singer's first collaboration with a Detective Conan movie.

== Release ==
The film made its North American premiere at the 2026 Anime NYC convention in New York City on August 22, 2026, and was released on digital platforms in North America the following day with an English dub. It is the first Detective Conan film dubbed by Studio Nano, succeeding prior English dubs produced by Bang Zoom! Entertainment.

== Reception ==
=== Box office ===
During the first three days, The Million-dollar Pentagram grossed ¥3.35 billion ($22.2 million) domestically. .As of October 13, 2024, the movie grossed $50 million internationally, with $40 million from China. The film grossed ¥15.80 billion ($100.51 million) in Japan, making it the highest-grossing domestic film of 2024.

=== Critical reception ===
The movie received mixed reviews from critics. Jennie Kermode of Eye for Film described the film as a "mixed bag", writing that "The balance of the central mystery and teenage angst doesn't always work, and even viewers who are in their teens themselves will likely become frustrated with it at times, but there is a good supply of drama elsewhere." Phuong Le of The Guardian, in a mixed review, praised the choice of setting of the Goryōkaku fort, but criticised the plot, saying that "the film's climax feels less like a showcase of Conan's intellect and more like an excuse for an action sequence". Tom Spoors of Loud and Clear Reviews wrote that the film's storyline "just isn't that compelling by itself". Gavin Spoors of Filmhounds described the film as "purely for the fans" while being a "flashy, fun feature film" for curious viewers. He praises the action sequences while criticizing the amount of characters involved and the occasional drop in animation quality.
