= Kaito Kuroba =

- Magic Kaito and Case Closed character
- Kaito Kuroba in Kaito Kid disguise, as drawn by Gosho Aoyama
- First appearance: Magic Kaito Ch. 1: "Return of the Phantom Thief" (1987)
- Created by: Gosho Aoyama
- Voiced by: Japanese; Kappei Yamaguchi; English; Jerry Jewell (Funimation); Griffin Burns (Bang Zoom/Macias Group); Mauricio Ortiz-Segura (Studio Nano); TBC (Magic Kaito 1412)

In-universe information
- Aliases: Kaito Kid; Kaito 1412; Phantom Thief Kid; Kid the Phantom; Thief Kaitou 1412; Moonlight Magician; The Heisei Lupin; The Last Wizard of the Century
- Gender: Male
- Occupation: Magician; Ventriloquist; Disguise artist Gentleman thief
- Relatives: Toichi Kuroba (father); Chikage Kuroba (mother); Yusaku Kudo (uncle); Yukiko Kudo (aunt); Shinichi Kudo (cousin)
- Nationality: Japanese

Profile
- Age: 17
- Birthday: June 21

Kaito Kuroba (Japanese: 黒羽 快斗, Hepburn: Kuroba Kaito), the true identity of the gentleman thief Kaito Kid (怪盗キッド, Kaitō Kiddo; lit. 'Phantom Thief Kid'), is a fictional character and the main protagonist of the Magic Kaito manga series created by Gosho Aoyama. His father Toichi Kuroba was the original Kaito Kid before being killed by an unknown organization, while his mother Chikage Kuroba was a former phantom thief known as the Phantom Lady. Kaito Kuroba then takes on the role of Kid after learning the organization is after a gemstone called Pandora and decides to find and destroy it.

The Magic Kaito manga has been published in Shogakukan's Weekly Shōnen Sunday magazine infrequently since June 1987. It was also adapted into a 12-episode anime by TMS Entertainment, which aired from 2010 to 2012. Moreover, a 24-episode anime series titled Magic Kaito 1412 was created by A-1 Pictures and broadcast from 2014 to 2015.

Kaito Kuroba has also made significant appearances in Aoyama's Case Closed series. He is a rival to the series' main protagonist, Shinichi Kudo, though they are allies on some occasions. However, his appearances mostly don't affect the main story plot of the series. His strong resemblance to Shinichi allows Kaito to impersonate him without a mask. He is also voiced by the same voice actors as Shinichi in Japanese and English. When Case Closed was localized into English, Viz Media chose the rōmaji "Kaito Kid" for the manga; in the anime, the English dub produced by Funimation Entertainment refer to him as "Phantom Thief Kid", while the dubs produced by Bang Zoom! Entertainment, Macias Group, and Studio Nano refer to him as "Kid the Phantom Thief". Shogakukan Asia also chose to use Kaito Kid.

== Creation ==
Kaito Kid was created by Japanese manga artist Gosho Aoyama for his 1987 manga series Magic Kaito. He conceived the story of a high school student turned master thief, inspired by the long-standing tradition of gentleman thief characters in Japanese pop culture. The author has acknowledged influences from famous fictional criminals such as Arsène Lupin and the 1967 anime Lupin III. "Kaito" means "phantom thief" in Japanese.

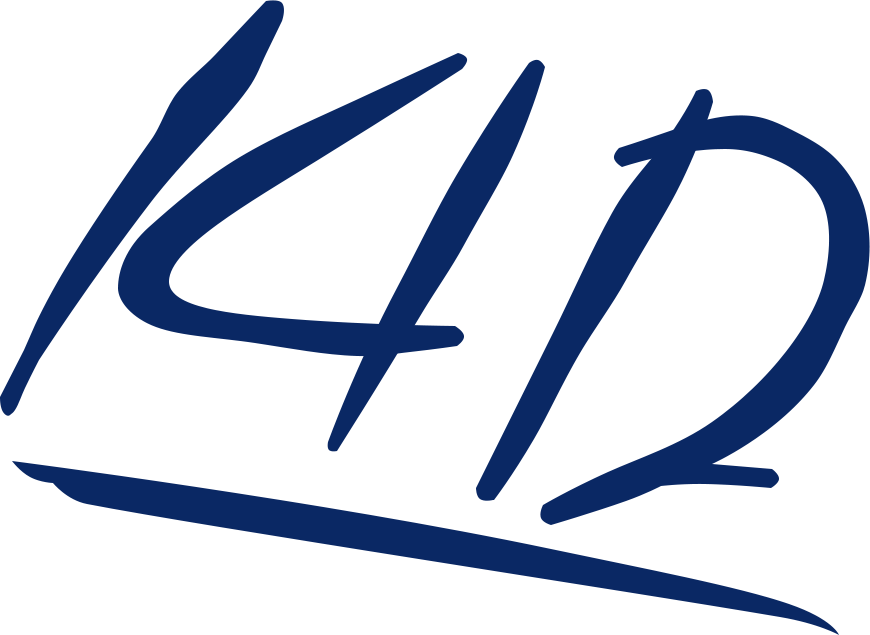
The number "1412" as written in the series, which resembles the word "kid"

Wanting a rival character for Conan Edogawa that was similar to the Fiend with Twenty Faces in Edogawa Rampo's mysteries, Aoyama realized he had already created one in the Kaito Kid. Although he received permission from the editor of Weekly Shōnen Sunday, the author initially had doubts and hesitated to go ahead with including Kaito in Case Closed. In Case Closed, it is revealed that Kaito Kid was known amongst intelligence agencies such as the FBI, CIA, or Interpol by the international criminal number "1412". When a journalist leaked this information to Booker Kudo, a famous author, he read the number that was scribbled down as the English word "Kid" and it went on to become the most common name used for the thief.

While Magic Kaito initially focused solely on the adventures of the official character, production of the manga was periodic, with long intervals between chapters due to Aoyama's other ongoing work, Case Closed. However, Kaito Kid's popularity in the newer manga led to several crossover appearances, making him a recurring character in the series. The character's role in Detective Conan boosted his fame, resulting in special anime episodes and his own dedicated arc within the larger series. Over time, various adaptations of Kaito Kid have been produced, including animated television specials, theatrical appearances in Case Closed films, and merchandise. The production of these adaptations often involved collaboration between different animation studios, with TMS Entertainment producing the majority of the anime content.

== Appearances ==
=== In Magic Kaito ===
Kaito Kuroba is a seventeen-year-old high school student who is an adept magician due to the influence of his father, Toichi Kuroba. Eight years prior to the series, Toichi had mysteriously died and was also the last time the Kaito Kid was spotted. In the present time, Kaito discovers a secret room in his home that was set up by his father to reveal itself on that very day. Finding the Kaito Kid's gadgets and costume in the room, Kaito dons the disguise and decides to confront Kid who has recently resurfaced after his eight years of absence. Kaito discovers Kid to be Konosuke Jii, his father's butler, who ascertains Toichi was the first Kaito Kid. Jii reveals his took on the role as Kid to lure out Toichi's murderer. Upon learning that his father was murdered, Kaito continues the role of the Kaito Kid as he searches for his father's killer.

As the Kaito Kid, Kaito uses his skills of perfect disguise and the gadgets his father left him to complete his heists. The most prominent of those gadgets are his cape which transforms into a hang-glider, a gun that shoots sharp metallic playing cards, and smoke bombs. To lure out the murderers, Kaito adopts a tradition of sending a note of his intending theft to the location beforehand. After a successful heist, Kaito returns the stolen treasures. As the Kaito Kid, Kaito eventually meets the organization who killed his father. He discovers they are searching for the gemstone called Pandora (パンドラ) which grants immortality if the water it emits during Volley's Comet is drunk. Pandora is hidden in a larger gemstone and can only be seen if shone under the moonlight. Kaito decides to search for Pandora with the intention of destroying it and begins focusing his heists on large gemstones. As such, he begins the tradition of checking gemstones from his heists under the moonlight before returning them to their rightful owners.

=== In Case Closed ===
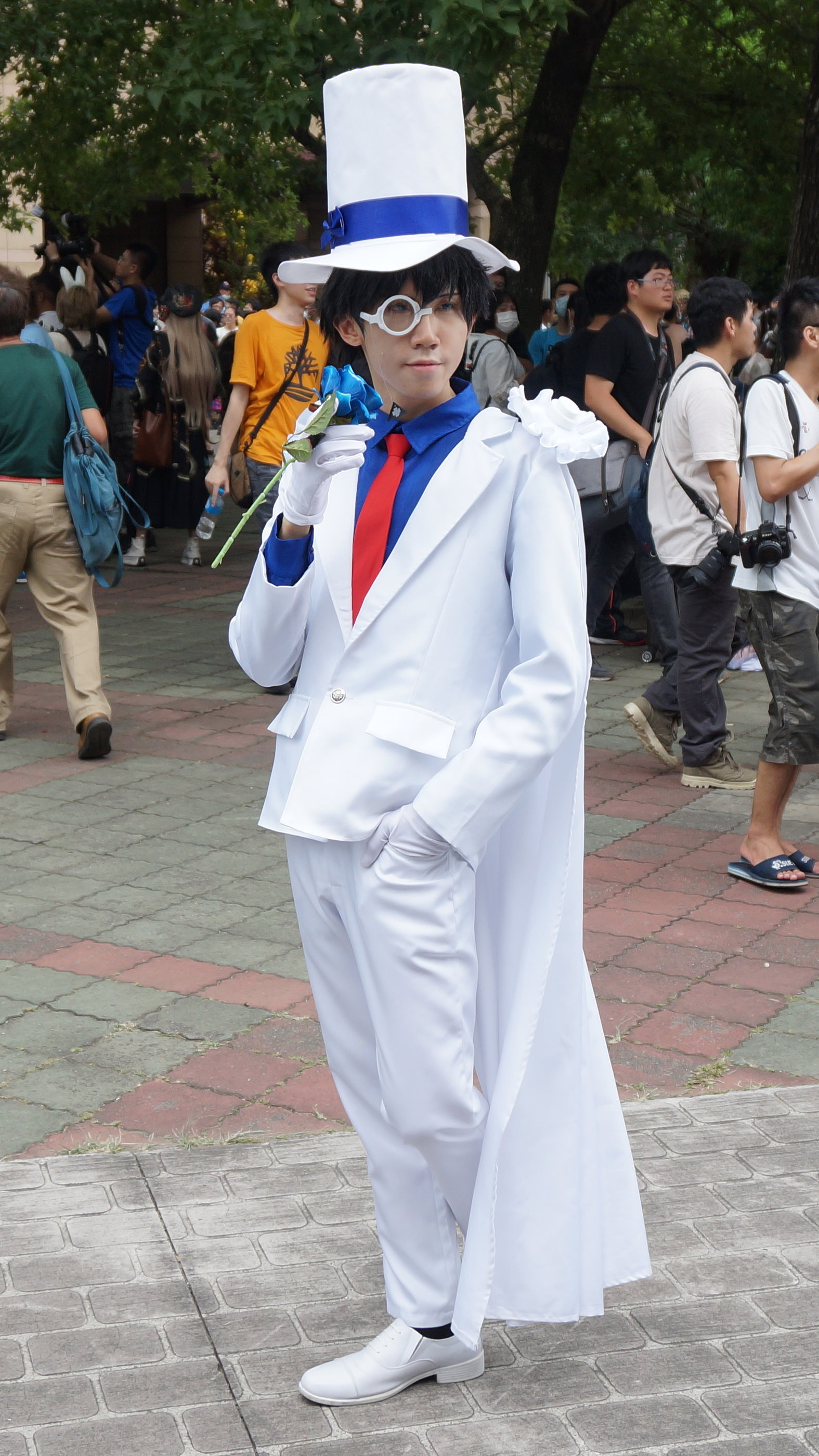
A Kaito Kid cosplayer

Kaito Kuroba, as the Kaito Kid, appears in Aoyama's manga series Case Closed as an rival and occasional ally to his rival, Conan. He is introduced as Kaito 1412, but is referred to as Kid later on. He is confronted by the protagonist of the series, Shinichi Kudo; teen detective turned child under the alias Conan Edogawa, who often foils his plans but Kid still eludes capture. Kaito also garners the attention of Jirokichi Suzuki who wants to capture Kid for fame. In the series, it is revealed that Shinichi's father Yusaku Kudo was the one who came up with the Kaito 1412 and Kaito Kid moniker. In the Case Closed film series, Kaito reveals he knows Conan is actually Shinichi. Due to Kaito's strong resemblance to Shinichi, he is able to disguise himself as Shinichi Kudo without a mask.

Kaito has made eight appearances in the films. In Case Closed: The Last Wizard of the Century, he steals a fabergé egg to return to its rightful owner while helping Shinichi on his investigation for an assassin. In Case Closed: Magician of the Silver Sky, he continues his search for Pandora as Shinichi attempts to impede his heist. Kaito makes his third appearance in Case Closed: The Private Eyes' Requiem, where he indirectly helps Shinichi solve an old murder. His fourth appearance takes place in Case Closed: The Lost Ship in the Sky where Jirokichi baits him with a large gemstone on an airship as he attempts to capture him. He is also featured in Lupin the 3rd vs. Detective Conan: The Movie and Case Closed: Sunflowers of Inferno. In the latter, it's revealed that despite being a thief, Kid is a man of honor. In Detective Conan: The Million-dollar Pentagram, it is revealed that Kaito and Conan are cousins.

== Reception ==
Kaito Kid, also known as the "Phantom Thief Kid", has been widely appreciated by both fans and critics. His charismatic personality and unique role as a gentleman thief have earned him comparisons to famous fictional thieves such as Arsène Lupin. Kaito's charm, wit, and ability to consistently outsmart law enforcement officers have been praised for adding excitement and entertainment to his character. His mysterious nature, especially in Detective Conan, has also been highlighted, where his playful rivalry with Shinichi Kudo (Conan) brings a layer of intrigue to the series. According to Anime News Network, Kaito Kid "adds a touch of magic" to otherwise intense investigations.

Kaito Kid frequently ranks high in character popularity polls in Japan. In a Case Closed character popularity poll, Kaito ranked as the most popular character in the series. In an online poll by Conan Movie.jp, he placed second with 19% of the votes. My Anime List also noted his popularity, particularly due to his lighthearted yet cunning persona, which contrasts with the more serious tone of typical crime-solving stories.

Despite the generally positive reception, some critics argue that Kaito Kid's resemblance to other fictional thieves makes his character seem derivative. The Fandom Post remarked that, while entertaining, Kaito's character often feels like a 'recycled archetype,' heavily borrowing from classic thief tropes. However, others appreciate his dynamic with the main protagonist. John Sinnott from DVD Talk described Kaito Kuroba as an interesting character, particularly because he is able to escape from Shinichi Kudo, the central character of Case Closed. Rebecca Silverman of Anime News Network also described him as "interesting" and noted that "it is a lot of fun" to watch how he defies Shinichi and serves as his "foil." Similarly, Amanda Tarbet from SequentialTart.com found the Phantom Thief Kid to be an amusing character due to his gentlemanly manners and skills.

== See also ==
- Magic Kaito
- List of Case Closed characters
