= Case Closed: The Last Wizard of the Century =

- Theatrical release poster
- Kanji: 名探偵コナン 世紀末の魔術師
- Revised Hepburn: Meitantei Konan: Seikimatsu no Majutsushi
- Directed by: Kenji Kodama
- Written by: Kazunari Kouchi
- Based on: Case Closed by Gosho Aoyama
- Produced by: Masahito Yoshioka; Michihiko Suwa
- Starring: Minami Takayama; Kappei Yamaguchi; Akira Kamiya; Wakana Yamazaki; Megumi Hayashibara; Emi Shinohara; Ryō Horikawa; Yūko Miyamura; Naoko Matsui; Yukiko Iwai; Ikue Ōtani; Wataru Takagi; Kaneto Shiozawa; Kenichi Ogata; Unshou Ishizuka; Chafurin
- Cinematography: Takashi Nomura
- Edited by: Terumitsu Okada
- Music by: Katsuo Ono
- Production company: TMS-Kyokuichi
- Distributed by: Toho
- Release date: April 17, 1999
- Running time: 99 minutes
- Country: Japan
- Language: Japanese
- Box office: ¥2.6 billion

Case Closed: The Last Wizard of the Century, known as Detective Conan: The Last Wizard of the Century (名探偵コナン 世紀末の魔術師, Meitantei Konan: Seikimatsu no Majutsushi) in Japan, is a 1999 Japanese animated mystery film based on the Case Closed series. It was directed by Kenji Kodama and released in Japanese theatres on April 17, 1999. FUNimation Entertainment acquired the rights to this film from TMS Entertainment on July 17, 2009, and released the dub in December 2009. This is the first film appearance of Vi Graythorn (Ai Haibara), Phantom Thief Kid (Kaito Kid) and Harley Hartwell (Heiji Hattori) and Kirsten Thomas (Kazuha Toyama).

== Plot ==
The Kaito Kid sends a heist notice, warning of another heist. The police deduce that his next target is a recently discovered Fabergé egg, which Suzuki Modern Art Museum in Osaka will display on August 22. On the night of the heist, Kid steals the egg from the warehouse that Ginzo Nakamori secretly kept and flies off, and Conan Edogawa and Heiji Hattori give chase. However, in the middle of the chase, an unknown assailant shoots Kid in the right eye, and Kid apparently falls into the sea to his death. After recovering the egg, the police fruitlessly search for Kid's body.

The next day, Conan, Ran, and Kogoro Mouri board a cruise ship to Tokyo where Ran nursing one of Kid's pigeons. They meet Natsumi Kousaka, whose great-grandfather Keiichi worked in Fabergé's factory. She shows them a part of a sketch of two eggs and a key, which were found among her late grandmother's mementos. Conan suspects that the person who shot Kid is on the ship. That night, Ryu Sagawa, a freelance photographer covering the press with news of the egg, is murdered, shot in the right eye in the same fashion as Kid. Soon after his body is discovered, Juzo Megure, along with Wataru Takagi and Ninzaburou Shiratori, arrive by helicopter to inspect the crime scene. At first, they suspect Sonoko Suzuki's father's servant, Mr. Nishino, but the police and Conan conclude the culprit is Scorpion, a mysterious killer who always shoots his victims in the right eye. A missing lifeboat hints that Scorpion has escaped, and the boat's passengers go to Yokosuka Castle, which holds Scorpion's next target: the second egg.

While exploring the castle, the group stumbles across secret passages beneath the castle. As they traverse the tunnels, Toichi Inui, an art dealer, pursues Scorpion in one of the tunnels, and is shot by a silenced handgun. Delving further into the tunnel, they find a coffin with a corpse of Natsumi's great-grandmother clutching the second egg. Suddenly, the two eggs are snatched away by Scorpion, who sets Yokosuka Castle ablaze. Conan deduces that Scorpion is the Russian-Japanese historian Seiran Hoshi, who shoots her victims in the right eye to avenge her ancestor, Grigori Rasputin, whose body was found with an eye missing.

Seiran attempts to kill Conan with her last bullet, but the bullet ricochets off the bulletproof glass on Conan's glasses he had Dr. Agasa install. As Conan kicks a rock, she reloads and is about to fire when a mysterious playing card knocks the gun out of her hands. Conan then knocks Seiran out with the rock, just before Shiratori carries her out and mysteriously disappears. Meanwhile, Agasa rescues the Detective Boys, Ai Haibara and the others from the burning castle.

Back in Beika, Conan is about to confess to Ran that he's Shinichi Kudo, only to be interrupted by Kid disguised as Shinichi. Kid, who revealed to be disguised as Shiratori all along when the real Shigatori go on the vacation, did this to save Conan from revealing his true identity and to thank him for nursing his pigeon back to health. It is also revealed that Maria, the daughter of Nicholas II, was Natsumi's great-grandmother. Keiichi fell in love with Maria, and they eloped to Japan during the Russian Revolution. Kid then disappears in a flurry of pigeons.

Meanwhile during questioning with Seiran at the police department, Shiratori returns from the vacation in Karuizawa, much to Megure's confusion.

== Cast ==
Character	Japanese	English
Conan Edogawa	Minami Takayama	Alison Viktorin
Shinichi Kudo/Jimmy Kudo (himself and Kid's disguise)	Kappei Yamaguchi	Jerry Jewell
Kaito Kuroba/Kaito Kid/Phantom Thief Kid	Kappei Yamaguchi	Jerry Jewell
Ayumi Yoshida/Amy Yeager	Yukiko Iwai	Monica Rial
Ginzo Nakamori/Mace Fuller	Unshō Ishizuka	Ian Sinclair
Detective Cashman		Andy Mullins
Detective Koumori		Bruce Lewis
Detective Nishimura		Jeremy Inman
Ninzaburou Shiratori/Nicholas Santos (himself and Kid's disguise)	Kaneto Shiozawa	Eric Vale
Detective Yazstremski		Billy Wilson
Detective Yokoyama		Greg Silva
Dr. Hiroshi Agasa	Kenichi Ogata	Bill Flynn
Genta Kojima/George Kaminski	Wataru Takagi	Mike McFarland
Wataru Takagi / Harry Wilder	Wataru Takagi	Doug Burks
Giordano Infantino		Ed Blaylock
Heiji Hattori/Harley Hartwell	Ryō Horikawa	Kevin M. Connolly
Juzo Megure/Joseph Meguire	Chafurin	Mark Stoddard
Kazuha Toyama/Kirsten Thomas	Yūko Miyamura	Gwendolyn Lau
Maxwell Nishino		Anthony Bowling
Mitsuhiko Tsuburaya/Mitch Tennyson	Ikue Ōtani	Cynthia Cranz
Natsumi Kousaka/Natasha Kousaka	Emi Shinohara	Trina Nishimura
Ran Mouri/Rachel Moore	Wakana Yamazaki	Colleen Clinkenbeard
Ryu Sagawa/Ray Segue		Christopher Bevins
Kogoro Mouri/Richard Moore	Akira Kamiya	R Bruce Elliott
Samuel Sebastian		Cole Brown
Seiran Hoshi		Clarine Harp
Sonoko Suzuki/Serena Sebastian	Naoko Matsui	Laura Bailey
Sergei Ovchinnikov		Christopher Ayres
Ai Haibara/Vi Graythorn	Megumi Hayashibara	Brina Palencia
Sotheby		Grant James
Superintendent Chaki		Bill Jenkins
Wilder		Doug Burkes

== Production ==
=== Music ===
Ending theme: "One" by B'z

== Release ==
In Japan, the film earned a distributors' income (rentals) of ¥1.45 billion, and a total box office gross of ¥2.6 billion.

The Last Wizard of the Century was released in the U.S. on December 29, 2009. Funimation owns the publishing rights for the English version.

In the popularity poll of 19 successive Case Closed films held in 2016, this work won the 7th place.

== Home media ==
=== VHS ===
Detective Conan: The Last Wizard of the Century, was released on VHS on April 12, 2003, by Polydor Records.

=== Region 2 DVD ===
Polydor Records released the film in a DVD format on September 30, 2002. A new DVD was released on February 25, 2011, significantly lowering the original price and added the trailer as a special feature.

=== Region 1 DVD ===
Detective Conan: The Last Wizard of the Century was licensed by FUNimation Entertainment on July 17, 2009, under the name Case Closed - Movie: The Last Wizard of the Century. It was released straight to DVD on December 29, 2009.

=== Blu-ray ===
The Blu-ray version of the film was released on July 22, 2011. The Blu-ray contains the same content of the DVD plus a mini-booklet explaining the film and the BD-live function.

== Reception ==
DVD Talk's Todd Douglass considers the film as one of Case Closed's better adventures and remarks the quality adventure and creative storyline, commenting on how they make the film more than an extended episode. Anime News Network's Theron Martin also viewed the film positively, despite having minor problems with lackluster artwork and little of the Phantom Thief Kid, he found the film accessible and said that it'll allow viewers to "enjoy the series at its best without having to wade through endless tracks of episodes."
