= Magic Kaito =

Japanese manga series and its adaptations

- First tankōbon volume cover, featuring Kaito Kuroba

まじっく快斗 (Majikku Kaito)
- Genre: Action, mystery
- Manga
- Written by: Gosho Aoyama
- Published by: Shogakukan
- Imprint: Shōnen Sunday Comics
- Magazine: Weekly Shōnen Sunday
- Original run: June 10, 1987 – present
- Volumes: 5
- Anime television series
- Directed by: Toshiki Hirano
- Produced by: Mitomu Asai; Masahito Yoshioka (1); Shuichi Kitada (2–8); Takeshi Mizogami (2–8); Isato Yonekura (9–12); Takeshi Mizogami (9–12)
- Written by: Junichi Miyashita; Aya Yoshinaga
- Music by: Atsushi Umebori
- Studio: TMS Entertainment
- Original network: NNS (ytv)
- Original run: April 17, 2010 – December 29, 2012
- Episodes: 12
- Anime television series

Magic Kaito 1412
- Directed by: Susumu Kudo
- Produced by: Koji Nagai; Tomonori Ochikoshi
- Written by: Kunihiko Okada; Toshiya Ono
- Music by: Taku Iwasaki
- Studio: A-1 Pictures
- Licensed by: Crunchyroll
- Original network: NNS (ytv)
- Original run: October 4, 2014 – March 28, 2015
- Episodes: 24
- icon

Magic Kaito (Japanese: まじっく快斗, Hepburn: Majikku Kaito) is a Japanese manga series written and illustrated by Gosho Aoyama. It premiered in Shogakukan's shōnen manga magazine Weekly Shōnen Sunday in June 1987. It is Aoyama's first serialized manga. The story depicts the adventures of Kaito Kuroba, a teenage magician who secretly operates as the internationally wanted phantom thief Kaito Kid.

Though the series was popular in its initial run, Aoyama placed it on hiatus in late 1988—after two tankōbon volumes had been published—in order to focus on Yaiba and later Case Closed. Since then, new installments have been produced very sporadically, often years apart; a third volume was compiled in 1994, a fourth in 2007, and a fifth in 2017; three more chapters were published in 2024. Notwithstanding this, Kaito Kid has (along with several associated characters) made numerous appearances in Case Closed and various spinoff media, achieving much wider recognition through them.

12 animated television specials based on the series have been produced by TMS Entertainment and aired between 2010 and 2012. A 24-episode anime series titled Magic Kaito 1412 was produced by A-1 Pictures and aired from October 2014 to March 2015.

== Synopsis ==
High-school class clown Kaito Kuroba, son of world-famous—and deceased—magician Toichi Kuroba, leads a carefree life in Tokyo with his childhood friend Aoko Nakamori. However, on the eighth anniversary of his father's death, he stumbles across a hidden section of his home that reveals his father's double life: that of the internationally notorious thief Kaito Kid. Shortly after, he finds his father's elderly aide Konosuke Jii masquerading as Kid in a new series of burglaries; when cornered, Jii admits the "accident" which had killed the elder Kuroba in his final show was actually murder, and the culprits remain at large.

Vowing to avenge his father, Kaito personally assumes Kaito Kid's mantle, and continues the heists for the same reason as Jii: to draw out his father's killers. By day, he maintains the guise of an ordinary high-schooler and his friendship with Aoko, all while knowing her father is a police inspector long-obsessed with capturing Kid.

After many outlandish adventures, Kaito eventually discovers that the killers belong to a mysterious crime syndicate pursuing a legendary jewel known as Pandora. Per the legend, Pandora is a doublet—a gem hidden within a larger gem—that glows red under moonlight and sheds "tears" during the passing of the Volley Comet, every 10,000 years. These tears, if drunk, will bestow immortality.

With the comet's next pass fast approaching, Kaito sets out to find—and destroy—Pandora first, turning his focus exclusively to large, long-storied gemstones.

=== Connections with Case Closed ===
While Magic Kaito has always shared a number of elements with Aoyama's later series Case Closed (such as the Tropical Land amusement park), Aoyama did not originally view them as a serious shared universe. When planning a Case Closed storyline in 1997 guest-starring Kaito Kid and Inspector Nakamori (with cameo appearances from Kaito Kuroba in his civilian identity and Aoko Nakamori), he intended for it to be a standalone, with no impact on either series' continuity besides a retroactive origin for Kid's alias. However, the story's unexpected popularity inspired many more Kid appearances throughout Case Closed, and even a Magic Kaito storyline guest-starring a full-grown Jimmy Kudo.

In 2006, Aoyama explicitly tied Kaito's backstory into that of Case Closed, revealing that Toichi Kuroba had not only maintained a rivalry with Booker Kudo as the first Kaito Kid, but tutored both Vivian Kudo and Sharon Vineyard in disguise arts. A 2010 storyline tied the two series closer still, with a Case Closed story introducing Chikage Kuroba's identity as the Phantom Lady immediately followed by a Magic Kaito story explaining her past (as well as the context of Kaito's actions in the present-day).

Despite this, Aoyama has repeatedly stated that the two series exist in separate continuities, in particular citing Akako's sorcery as an element that cannot coexist with Case Closed. He has also denied longstanding fan theories that Snake belongs to the "Black Organization" serving as Case Closed's main antagonists, and maintained that—with the one-time exception of 2012's "Mystery Train" arc—Kaito Kid would not have any story involvement with the latter.

== Characters ==
Kaito Kuroba (黒羽 快斗, Kuroba Kaito)
A smart, quirky and arrogant 17-year-old master illusionist. As Kaito Kid, he occasionally appears in the Case Closed series as an antagonist, but slowly develops a Lupin-esque complex. He has some feelings for his childhood friend Aoko Nakamori who he teases constantly. His alter ego is Kaito Kid, a gentleman thief who publicly announces his heists; after his heists, he returns the stolen items to their owners. Throughout his escapades he has made many enemies, from semi-friendly detectives (such as Saguru Hakuba and Conan Edogawa/Jimmy Kudo) and policemen to rival phantom thieves and vicious professional gangsters. His Japanese voice actor is Kappei Yamaguchi and his English voice actors are Jerry Jewell for Funimation, Griffin Burns for Bang Zoom and Macias Group, and Mauricio Ortiz-Segura for Studio Nano.
Aoko Nakamori (中森 青子, Nakamori Aoko)
Kaito's best friend since childhood and love interest. She is an obstinate, impulsive and lighthearted girl. She often bickers with Kaito at school. She has feelings for Kaito, although she is afraid of admitting to him. She gets along well with Akako, but unknown to her, Akako envies her. Both girls vie for Kaito's affections. As the daughter of Inspector Nakamori, she despises Kaito Kid, though she is unaware of the irony. Her Japanese voice actresses are Ayumi Fujimura in the specials, Mao Ichimichi in Magic Kaito 1412, Detective Conan: The Million-dollar Pentagram, and episode 1187 of Case Closed, Yukiko Iwai in episode 76 of Case Closed, Minami Takayama in episode 219 and the fourth OVA of Case Closed. Her English voice actress is Jill Harris in the English dub of Detective Conan: The Million-dollar Pentagram.
Ginzo Nakamori (中森 銀三, Nakamori Ginzō)
Aoko's father (known as Mace Fuller in Funimation's Case Closed dub), a loud, aggressive Tokyo Metropolitan Police inspector assigned to capture Kaito Kid. Tirelessly devoted to his work, he is (much to Aoko's dismay) frequently absent-minded at home. His Japanese voice actors are Unshō Ishizuka (1997–2018) and Kōji Ishii (2019–present) and his English voice actor is Jay Jones.
Konosuke Jii (寺井 黄之助, Jii Kōnosuke)
An elderly man who assisted Toichi Kuroba as both a magician and thief. Eight years after his master's murder, he began a masquerade as Kaito Kid in hopes of luring out the killers; when confronted by Kaito, he confessed the truth and ceded the mantle, becoming Kaito's assistant. By day he owns and operates the Blue Parrot billiards bar, an occasional hangout for Kaito and Aoko.
Toichi Kuroba (黒羽 盗一, Kuroba Tōichi)
Kaito's (supposedly) deceased father. A world-famous magician, he originated the Kaito Kid costume as a gimmick for a Parisian performance, but became a genuine thief in order to divert attention from his wife Chikage's own criminal career, allowing her to retire in peace. Initially known as Phantom Thief 1412 (after his Interpol criminal code), he embraced Kaito Kid as a moniker after Booker Kudo publicly misread a journalist's scrawl of "1412" as KID. Toichi was killed after impeding a criminal syndicate's pursuit of Pandora. His Japanese voice actor is Shūichi Ikeda.
Chikage Kuroba (黒羽 千影, Kuroba Chikage)
Kaito's mother, initially shown as a plain housewife but later revealed to have once been the international thief Phantom Lady. During a heist in Paris, she fell in love with Toichi Kuroba and quit her criminal career to marry him. Even in retirement, she remains a free-spirited globetrotter, and frequently leaves Kaito alone at the Kuroba home in Japan, periodically checking in via video calls. She once tried to persuade her son to give up robbery and start a new life as a magician in Las Vegas. It is strongly implied in the "Midnight Crow" Arc that she knows who is Kaito Corbeau, the mysterious rival of Kaito Kid, who had recently become active in Las Vegas. Her Japanese voice actress is Michie Tomizawa.
Akako Koizumi (小泉 紅子, Koizumi Akako)
A haughty teenage witch, the world's last practitioner of "Red" sorcery. She delights in magically charming men to worship her, and becomes obsessed with Kaito Kid upon learning that he is destined to be the only man on Earth immune to her. By happenstance she attends the same school as Kaito and Aoko, and realizes Kaito's secret identity when he defies her advances on Valentine's Day. Initially, she acts with very few morals, regularly scheming to magically enslave (or even kill) him; in time, however, she grows into a genuine affection for him, and begins using her magical resources to warn and aid him against other perils. Her Japanese voice actresses are Miyuki Sawashiro in the Magic Kaito specials, Eri Kitamura in Magic Kaito 1412, and Megumi Hayashibara in Case Closed.
Saguru Hakuba (白馬探, Hakuba Saguru)
The half-British, half-Japanese son of the Tokyo Metropolitan Police's Superintendent-General. Renowned across Europe as an amateur detective, he takes an interest in capturing Kaito Kid and resettles in Japan to do so, becoming a major school rival to Kaito. He is highly sophisticated and arrogantly proud of his skills, suspecting Kaito's secret identity almost immediately after their first meeting. However, he never succeeds in securing definitive proof. His Japanese voice actors are Akira Ishida in the Magic Kaito specials and in Case Closed, and Mamoru Miyano in Magic Kaito 1412.
Snake (スネーク, Sunēku)
The main representative of the syndicate that killed Toichi Kuroba, and continues to pursue the Pandora gem. A vicious hitman, he possesses limited intelligence, but is always well-armed and often supported by several subordinates.

== Production ==
In 1985, having been convinced by university friends to pursue a professional manga career, Aoyama drafted a 40-page one-shot titled Nonchalant Lupin (さりげなく ルパン, Sarigenaku Rupan). This story, inspired by Aoyama's childhood love of mystery and phantom-thief fiction in addition to Zoetrope Studios' The Escape Artist (1982), featured a mischievous teenage magician named Kaito Lupin trying to save his childhood friend Aoko Holmes from corrupt school officials.

Aoyama initially sent Lupin to Kodansha's Weekly Shōnen Magazine, where he met enough approval to win an honorable mention at the thirty-fifth New Manga Awards, but was warned by an editor that his art-style would need modification to "fit" the magazine's general aesthetic if he were hired. The following year, Aoyama approached Shogakukan's Weekly Shōnen Sunday, which made no such stipulations; heartened, Aoyama quickly expanded Lupin into the basis for an ongoing series, renaming its lead characters Kaito Kuroba and Aoko Nakamori and converting its mostly-metaphorical Arsène Lupin motifs into an actual phantom thief identity.

== Media ==
=== Manga ===
Written and illustrated by Gosho Aoyama, Magic Kaito has been sporadically serialized in Shogakukan's shōnen manga magazine Weekly Shōnen Sunday since June 10, 1987. It was halted in 1988 after two tankōbon volumes, but new chapters have been occasionally released since then; a third volume was published in 1994, a fourth volume in 2007 and a fifth volume in 2017. In 2011 the first four volumes were republished in "Treasured Editions" from August 15 to December 16. Two versions of each volume were released, one containing a DVD of one of the TV specials. Three more chapters, not yet collected in a volume, were published between April 10 and April 24, 2024.

==== Volumes ====
No.	Release date	ISBN
1	April 15, 1988	978-4-09-122081-3
1. "The Phantom Thief Reborn" (蘇る怪盗, Yomigaeru Kaitō); 2. "The Police are Everywhere" (警官がいっぱい, Keikan ga Ippai); 3. "A Clockwork Heart" (時計仕掛けのハート, Tokei Jikake no Hāto); 4. "Kaito Kid's Busy Weekend" (怪盗キッドの忙しい休日, Kaitō Kiddo no Isogashii Kyūjitsu); 5. "The Underwater Pirate Ship" (海賊船浮上せず, Kaizokusen Fujōsezu); 6. "A Seduction in Scarlet" (緋色の誘惑, Hiiro no Yūwaku)
2	October 15, 1988	978-4-09-122082-0
7. "Stay Away From Him" (彼から手をひいて, Kare kara te o hiite); 8. "Japan's Most Irresponsible Leader" (日本一の無責任総理, Nippon'ichi no Musekinin Sōri); 9. "I Am The Master" (わたしが主人だ, Watashi ga Masutā Da); 10. "Adults Don't Understand" (大人とわかってくれない, Otona to Wakattekurenai); 11. "The Boy Who Bet on the Ball" (ボールにかける少年, Bōru ni Kakeru Shōnen); 12. "Ghost Game" (ゴースト・ゲーム, Gōsuto Gēmu); 13. "Hustler VS. Magician" (ハスラーvs.マジシャン, Hasurā vs Majishan)
Note: "Hustler VS. Magician" is actually the second chapter Aoyama created for the series, but it was never published in the magazine.
3	September 15, 1994	978-4-09-122083-7
14. "Star Wars" (スターウォーズ, Sutā Wōzu); 15. "Enter the Great Detective!!" (名探偵登場!!, Meitantei Tōjō!!); 16. "Nearby Enemy" (眼下の怪盗, Ganka no Kaitō); 17. "Akako's Delivery Service" (紅子の宅配便, Akako no Takuhaibin); 18. "Yaiba VS. Kaito!" (〈番外編〉刃vs.快斗!, (Bangaihen) Yaiba vs. Kaito!); 19. "Blue Birthday" (ブルーバースデー, Burū Bāsudē); 20. "Green Dream" (グリーンドリーム, Gurīn Dorīmu)
4	February 16, 2007	978-4-09-121005-0
21. "Crystal Mother (クリスタル・マザー, Kurisutaru mazā); 22. "Red Tear" (レッド・ティアー, Reddo Tiā); 23. "Black Star (Part 1)" (ブラック・スター(前編), Burakku Sutā (Zenpen)); 24. "Black Star (Part 2)" (ブラック・スター(後編), Burakku Sutā (Kōhen)); 25. "Golden Eye (Part 1)" (ゴールデン・アイ(前編), Gōruden Ai (Zenpen)); 26. "Golden Eye (Part 2)" (ゴールデン・アイ(後編), Gōruden Ai (Kōhen)); 27. "Dark Knight (Part 1)" (ダーク・ナイト(前編), Dāku Naito (Zenpen)); 28. "Dark Knight (Part 2)" (ダーク・ナイト(後編), Dāku Naito (Kōhen))
5	July 18, 2017	978-4-09-121005-0
29. "Phantom Lady (Part 1)" (ファントム・レディー(前編), Fantomu Redī (Zenpen)); 30. "Phantom Lady (Part 2)" (ファントム・レディー(後編), Fantomu Redī (Kōhen)); 31. "Midnight Crow (Part 1)" (真夜中の烏(ミッドナイト・クロウ)(前編), Mayonaka no Karasu (Middonaito Kurō) (Zenpen)); 32. "Midnight Crow (Part 2)" (真夜中の烏(ミッドナイト・クロウ)(中編), Mayonaka no Karasu (Middonaito Kurō) (Chūhen)); 33. "Midnight Crow (Part 3)" (真夜中の烏(ミッドナイト・クロウ)(後編), Mayonaka no Karasu (Middonaito Kurō) (Kōhen)); 34. "Sun Halo (Part 1)" (日輪の後光(サン・ヘイロー)(前編), Nichirin no Gokō (San Heirō) (Zenpen)); 35. "Sun Halo (Part 2)" (日輪の後光(サン・ヘイロー)(中編), Nichirin no Gokō (San Heirō) (Chūhen)); 36. "Sun Halo (Part 3)" (日輪の後光(サン・ヘイロー)(後編), Nichirin no Gokō (San Heirō) (Kōhen))
Note: "Nonchalant Lupin" (さりげなく ルパン, Sarigenaku Rupan) is published as a bonus story at the end of volume 5. This is a story created by Aoyama before starting Magic Kaito and featuring the characters Kaito Lupin, Aoko Holmes and Inspector Holmes, which are prototypes of Kaito Kuroba, Aoko Nakamori and Inspector Nakamori.

Chapters not yet in tankōbon format

37. "Green Dragon (Part 1)" (グリーン・ドラゴンの巻(前編), Gurīn Doragon no Maki (Zenpen)). Published on April 10, 2024.
38. "Green Dragon (Part 2)" (グリーン・ドラゴンの巻(中編), Gurīn Doragon no Maki (Chūhen)). Published on April 17, 2024.
39. "Green Dragon (Part 3)" (グリーン・ドラゴンの巻(後編), Gurīn Doragon no Maki (Kōhen)). Published on April 24, 2024.

=== Anime ===
==== Original video animations ====
Magic Kaito received its first anime adaptation in 2000, with the launch of Case Closed's direct-to-video OVA series: the first of these OVAs adapted "Yaiba VS. Kaito!" (Vol. 3's fifth chapter, originally published in 1989). The fourth, released in 2004, adapted "Crystal Mother" (Vol. 4's first chapter, originally published in 1995).

Between these two OVAs, the Case Closed anime also adapted "Black Star" (Vol. 4's third and fourth chapters, originally published in 1999) as part of its 219th episode, a two-hour special. This occupied roughly one-third of the episode, with the other two-thirds adapting an unrelated Kaito Kid story from the Case Closed manga.

==== Specials ====
TMS Entertainment produced twelve animated Magic Kaito television specials between 2010 and 2012, all directed by Toshiki Hirano and adapting select stories from the manga. Each aired on Yomiuri TV during Case Closed's regular time slot, and shared its contemporary opening and ending themes (the first three were billed as "Detective Conan Specials", despite minimal connection with the plot of Detective Conan / Case Closed). The first aired on April 17, 2010.

===== Episodes =====
Ep. no	Title	Original airdate
1	"Detective Conan Special: The Secret Origin of Kaito Kid" "Meitantei Konan Supesharu 「Kaitō Kiddo Tanjō no Himitsu」" (名探偵コナンスペシャル 「怪盗キッド誕生の秘密」)	April 17, 2010
After eight years' absence, phantom thief Kaito Kid suddenly reappears in Tokyo, stealing priceless jewels. News spreads from the pursuing inspector Ginzo Nakamori to his daughter Aoko to her friend Kaito Kuroba, an arrogant teenage magician who decides to challenge Kid. That afternoon, Kaito finds a secret room in his house full of Kid's equipment, apparently installed by his late father Toichi. At Kid's next heist, Kaito successfully unmasks the thief as Konosuke Jii, his father's old assistant, who confesses Toichi was the original Kid and murdered by forces unknown. Driven to avenge his father, Kaito takes over Kid's mantle.
2	"Detective Conan Special: Kaito Kid's Summer Festival: Kaito Kid's Busy Date" "Meitantei Konan Natsu no Kaitō Kiddo Matsuri "Kaitō Kiddo no Isogashii Dēto"" (名探偵コナン 夏の怪盗キッド祭り 「怪盗キッドの忙しいデート」)	August 6, 2011
During Kid's latest heist, Ginzo Nakamori sees his face and begins to suspect his secret identity. When Aoko hears these suspicions, she impulsively takes Kaito on a date at Tropical Land the day of Kid's next heist, determined to prove his innocence.
3	"Detective Conan Special: Kaito Kid's Summer Festival: The Princess Loves Magic" "Meitantei Konan Natsu no Kaitō Kiddo Matsuri "Ōjosama wa Majikku ga Osuki"" (名探偵コナン 夏の怪盗キッド祭 「王女様はマジックがお好き」)	August 13, 2011
Tokyo hosts a reception gala for a European princess with the continent's largest diamond, guarded by the arrogant and trigger-happy Detective Delon. His position threatened, Nakamori struggles to distinguish himself against Delon, while Kaito's infiltration of the gala cheers up the much-sheltered princess.
4	"Kaito Kid Special: The Witch That Sheds no Tears" "Kaitō Kiddo Supesharu "Majo wa Namida o Kobosanai"" (怪盗キッドスペシャル 「魔女は涙をこぼさない」)	September 24, 2011
Teenage witch Akako Koizumi is outraged to learn that Kaito Kid is the only man in the world immune to her charms. Transferring to Kaito's school, she deduces his identity when he defies her on Valentine's Day, and magically entraps Kid during his next heist, determined to claim his heart—or his life.
5	"Kaito Kid Special: The Fated Blue Birthday" "Kaitō Kiddo Supesharu "Unmei no Burū Bāsudē"" (怪盗キッドスペシャル 「運命のブルーバースデー」)	October 29, 2011
Ignoring a threatening call to stop his activities, Kaito targets the Blue Birthday sapphire while rashly promising Aoko an appearance at her birthday party the night of the heist. The threats soon manifest as an armed gang led by a man known only as Snake, who boasts of having killed Toichi. Though cornered, Kid fakes his death and manages to learn of their objective: an immortality-granting jewel known as Pandora, which can only be identified by moonlight. In his father's name, Kaito vows to find and destroy Pandora.
6	"Kaito Kid Special: Love on the Ski Slope on Christmas Eve" "Kaitō Kiddo Supesharu "Ivu wa Koisuru Gerende de"" (怪盗キッドスペシャル 「聖夜は恋するゲレンデで」)	December 24, 2011
During a school ski trip, Kaito finds himself caught between Aoko's insecurities and Akako's newest love-magic attempt. Things are further complicated when their class holds an impromptu "couples cosplay" rally, obligating him to choose one of the girls as his partner.
7	"Kaito Kid's Summer Festival: Magic Kaito (The Brilliant Rivals)" "Natsu no Kaitō Kiddo Matsuri Majikku Kaitō "Kareinaru Raibarutachi"" (夏の怪盗キッド祭り まじっく快斗「華麗なるライバルたち」)	August 4, 2012
Nakamori's task force is joined by teenage detective Saguru Hakuba, whose intellect poses Kid a serious challenge. However, their first showdown is interrupted by Hakuba's true target: the international assassin Spider, dispatched against Kid by Snake's syndicate. After they save each other from Spider (who retreats into his daytime identity, celebrity magician Gunter von Goldberg), Hakuba resolves to see the case through, and enrolls at Kaito's school.
8	"Kaito Kid's Summer Festival: The Secret of the Red Tear" "Natsu no Kaitō Kiddo Matsuri "Reddo Tiā no Himitsu"" (夏の怪盗キッド祭り 「レッド・ティアーの秘密」)	August 11, 2012
London magician Jody Hopper tours Tokyo with the Red Tear, a "cursed" ruby blamed for her father's death. When Snake and his men attack, Kaito resolves to not only save Jody, but reveal the ruby's true significance to her father's memory.
9	"Kaito Kid Special: The Witch, The Detective, and The Phantom Thief" "Kaitō Kiddo Supesharu "Majo to Tantei to Kaitō to"" (怪盗キッドスペシャル 「魔女と探偵と怪盗と」)	September 29, 2012
Akako magically foresees Kid's capture by Hakuba, who has DNA tested a stray hair from the latest heist to narrow down Kid's identity to Kaito. Torn between love and hate, Akako takes on Hakuba's next trap as a decoy Kid, but finds herself in greater peril when Spider joins the fray.
10	"Magic Kaito: The Reminiscent Golden Eye" "Majikku Kaito "Tsuioku no Gōruden Ai"" (まじっく快斗 「追憶のゴールデン・アイ」)	November 3, 2012
Kid is challenged by Parisian thief Chat Noir over the Golden Eye, the last piece of a jewelry set commissioned by Marie Antoinette. As Kid rises to this new opponent, however, he comes to realize the jewel's history may not be what it seems.
11	"Kaito Kid Winter Special: The Teary Crystal Mother" "Fuyu no Kaitō Kiddo Supesharu "Namida no Kurisutaru Mazā"" (冬の怪盗キッドスペシャル 「涙のクリスタル・マザー」)	December 22, 2012
On a luxury train to Osaka, Kaito pursues the Crystal Mother topaz held by Queen Selizabeth of Ingram. Again battling Snake and Spider, he also contends with the troubles of the queen's young, neglected son Philip.
12	"Kaito Kid Winter Special: Tears of Love for the Dark Knight" "Fuyu no Kaitō Kiddo Supesharu "Dāku Naito ni Ai no Namida wo"" (冬の怪盗キッドスペシャル 「ダーク･ナイトに愛の涙を」)	December 29, 2012
Kid is blackmailed into "partnership" with the notorious Nightmare, an international mastermind who has brought fortune and death alike to countless thieves. On Nightmare's trail comes Interpol agent Jack Connery.

==== Magic Kaito 1412 ====
A standalone 24-episode anime titled Magic Kaito 1412 (まじっく快斗1412) was produced by A-1 Pictures and aired on NNS from October 4, 2014, to March 28, 2015. The series was independent of the TMS series, and re-adapted many of the same stories from the manga (along with several previously unadapted). Save a few roles such as Kappei Yamaguchi reprising Kaito Kuroba/Kaito Kid, the voice cast was all-new. For the first 12 episodes, the opening theme is "Kimi no Matsu Sekai" (君の待つ世界; 'The World You Await'), performed by Lagoon, and the ending theme is "White of Crime", performed by Revalcy. For episodes 13–24, the opening theme is "Ai no Scenario" (アイのシナリオ), performed by CHiCO with HoneyWorks, and the ending theme is "Koi no Jumyō" (恋の寿命; 'The Lifespan of Love'), performed by Galileo Galilei.

Magic Kaito 1412 was the first Magic Kaito property to receive an official English release; in 2015, beginning with episode 13, Crunchyroll licensed it for simulcast for audiences in North America, with Japanese audio and English subtitles. An English dub began streaming on ODK Media's Amasian TV streaming service on November 18, 2025.

===== Episodes =====
No.	Title	Original release date
1	"Kid the Phantom Thief Returns"; Transliteration: "Yomigaeru Kaitō Kiddo" (Japanese: 蘇る怪盗KID)	October 4, 2014
When the mysterious phantom thief Kaito Kid returns after an eight year hiatus, teenager illusionist Kaito Kuroba vows to capture him with the power of magic. However, Kaito learns that his father who died eight years before was the original Kaito Kid, while the new Kid is his father's former assistant, Konosuke Jii. Kaito decides to take on the mantle of Kaito Kid.
2	"Blue Birthday"; Transliteration: "Burū Bāsudei" (Japanese: ブルーバースデイ)	October 11, 2014
After Kid steals a jewel, he gets a mysterious call from someone telling him not to take any more jewels unless he wants to die. Kaito ignores the warning and steals a giant blue jewel. He then learns that the group responsible for killing his father is stealing big jewels, as they believe one of the big jewels contains the Pandora stone, which can grant an individual eternal life. Kaito vows to find the jewel with the Pandora stone and crush it.
3	"Hustler vs. Magician"; Transliteration: "Hasurā VS Majishan" (Japanese: ハスラーVSマジシャン)	October 18, 2014
Kaito learns Jii was once a master pool shark that had a jeweled pool cue, which is supposed to only be kept by a master pool player. Kaito vows to steal it and return it to Jii, but instead he gets pulled into a game of 9-ball as himself against a hustler.
4	"A Great Detective Comes to Light"; Transliteration: "Meitantei wa Hakujitsu no Moto ni" (Japanese: 名探偵は白日の下に)	October 25, 2014
When teenage detective Saguru Hakuba returns from London, he vows to capture Kaito Kid. Hakuba quickly becomes a classmate to Kaito. When he sees Kaito refuse tickets to a concert with Aoko, they make a bet: if Hakuba can capture Kid then he can take Aoko to the concert. If he fails to do so, then Kaito will go with her.
5	"Scarlet Seduction"; Transliteration: "Hiiro no Yūwaku" (Japanese: 緋色の誘惑)	November 1, 2014
When a witch named Akako Koizumi moves into town she vows to steal all the men's hearts. However her magic mirror warns her that her magic will have no effect on Kid. On Valentine's Day, Kaito refuses Akako's chocolate, and Akako realizes he must be the Phantom Thief. On his next heist he is called to by Akako, who tries to make him become her newest puppet.
6	"Black Star"; Transliteration: "Burakku Sutā" (Japanese: ブラックスター)	November 8, 2014
As Kaito plans to steal the big jewel Black Star, he is reminded of a case where he was almost caught- the theft of the bell tower. Back then, the police was helped by high school detective Shinichi Kudo.
7	"Kaito Kuroba's Busy Day Off"; Transliteration: "Kuroba Kaito no Isogashii Kyūjitsu" (Japanese: 黒羽快斗の忙しい休日)	November 15, 2014
During one of Kaito Kid's thefts, Inspector Nakamori gets a brief look at the thief's face and recognizes him as Kaito. He tells his daughter of his suspicions, and to prove his innocence she takes Kaito on a date on Tropical Land the day that Kid is supposed to steal a crown. Just as it is time for Kaito to sneak away and steal the crown, she handcuffs him while they are watching a movie.
8	"Adult's Charm"; Transliteration: "Otona no Omajinai" (Japanese: 大人のおまじない)	November 22, 2014
Aoko hears stories of a ghost haunting the school and forces Kaito to investigate the mystery with her. The next day Akako becomes angry because she cannot get Kaito to pay attention to her, so she arranges for Inspector Nakamori to get a cursed necklace that will make him want to kill Kid while she waits for him in his expected escape route.
9	"Enter: The Phantom Lady"; Transliteration: "Fantomu Redi Tōjō" (Japanese: 怪盗淑女 登場)	November 29, 2014
Aoko wins a contest and gets an invitation to a diner in a tower with an exhibit. Kaito finds this suspicious and comes with her disguised as Inspector Nakamori, not knowing that the author of the contest believes that Inspector Nakamori is Kid. At the exhibit, Aoko is put to sleep with knockout gas and Kaito must face the mysterious man in a situation similar to the first meeting of his parents 18 years ago.
10	"Phantom Lady and the Ryoma Treasure"; Transliteration: "Fantomu Redi to Ryoma no Otakara" (Japanese: 怪盗淑女と龍馬のお宝)	December 6, 2014
The mystery man is finally revealed to be one President Gozu. Kid manages to escape and save Aoko. Afterwards Kaito confronts his mom on the phone, and she reveals that Gozu had two apprentices that are making money with the same frauds he did. As Kaito scouts a museum for his next job, he runs into none other than child detective Conan Edogawa.
11	"Kid, Conan, and the Ryoma Treasure Illusion"; Transliteration: "Kiddo Konan no Ryōma Otakara Iryūjon" (Japanese: KID コナンの龍馬お宝イリュージョン)	December 13, 2014
Kid makes his appearance inside the museum and exposes the fraud, and after that he has a confrontation with Conan.
12	"Holy Night: Two Kid the Phantom Thieves"; Transliteration: "Seiya – Futari no Kaitō Kiddo" (Japanese: 聖夜・二人の怪盗KID)	December 27, 2014
Three months have passed since Kid last committed a crime, and people are beginning to wonder where he has gone. A scheming store owner sends out a fake Kid notice claiming that he is going to steal the stores very valuable star tree jewel.
13	"Get Away from Him"; Transliteration: "Kare kara Te o Hīte" (Japanese: 彼から手をひいて)	January 10, 2015
The school class is taken on a ski trip, and the final nights exhibit is a couple's masquerade ski contest. Akako Koizumi aims to make Kaito her partner for the masquerade and even places a heart sticker on him trying to claim him as hers.
14	"Crystal Mother"; Transliteration: "Kurisutaru Mazā" (Japanese: クリスタル・マザー)	January 17, 2015
Kaito and Aoko manage to get passage on the same train as the Queen of Ingram, her large jewel known as the Principality of Ingram's Crystal Mother, and her son the Prince Philip. Kaito has sent out an advance message saying he is after the jewel.
15	"The Princess and the Thief's Improv"; Transliteration: "Ōjo to Dorobō no Sokkyōgeki" (Japanese: 王女と泥棒の即興劇)	January 24, 2015
When young Princess Anne from a foreign country arrives in Japan, Kid decides to make her jewel his next target. However his job is made much harder when trigger-happy Detective Delon is brought in from Europe to replace Inspector Nakamori as head of security.
16	"Kid vs. Conan: Miraculous Airwalking"; Transliteration: "Kiddo VS Konan Kiseki no Kūchū Hokō" (Japanese: KID VS コナン 奇跡の空中歩行)	January 31, 2015
When a rich old man, Jirokichi Suzuki, issues Kid a challenge to steal his big jewel Blue Wonder, Kid publicly scouts the scene by performing an illusion where he seemingly walks in midair, before announcing he will return the next day to take the jewel. In order to succeed it, he will have to challenge Detective Conan.
17	"Green Dream"; Transliteration: "Gurīn Dorīmu" (Japanese: グリーンドリーム)	February 7, 2015
Kaito targets a jewel known as the Green Dream, which is being used in the production of a local play. In order to scout the scene he disguises himself as a part-time worker on the set. The woman playing the heroine in the play is the daughter of the theater owner and she constantly ridicules everyone around her, especially a shy young actress named Megumi.
18	"Golden Eye (Part 1): Chat Noir's Challenge"; Transliteration: "Gōruden Ai (Zenpen) Shanowāru no Chōsen" (Japanese: ゴールデン・アイ《前編》 黒猫《シャノワール》の挑戦)	February 14, 2015
Kid is challenged by a French phantom thief, Chat Noir, who wants the two of them to try and steal a ring from Marie Antoinette's collection. Inspector Nakamori is going to be wearing the ring on his finger, and his hand will be rolled up into a fist, meaning the only way someone can get it is to chop off his finger.
19	"Golden Eye (Part 2): Kid vs. Chat Noir: Endgame!"; Transliteration: "Gōruden Ai (Kōhen) Ketchaku Kiddo vs Shanowāru" (Japanese: ゴールデン・アイ《後編》 決着KIDvs黒猫《シャノワール》)	February 21, 2015
Both Kid and Chat Noir make their attempts at stealing the ring, then they confront each other to determine who is the winner.
20	"Dark Knight"; Transliteration: "Dāku Naito" (Japanese: ダーク・ナイト)	February 28, 2015
Kid has trouble getting away after a heist, and international thief Nightmare helps him escape. Nightmare then blackmails Kid into doing a heist for him by threatening to reveal information that could compromise his identity. This time Nakamori works with Jack Connery, an Interpol agent that is after Nightmare, while Saguru Hakuba has returned to Japan and is making his way to the scene.
21	"Kid VS Conan: Teleportation Under The Moonlight"; Transliteration: "Kiddo VS Konan Gekka no Shunkan Idō" (Japanese: KIDvsコナン 月下の瞬間移動)	March 7, 2015
Jirokichi Suzuki again issues Kid a challenge to steal his purple gemmed sandals, exposed in the middle of a crossroad. Kid performs an illusion in which he seemingly teleports awaty after stealing them. However Kid has another opponent, as none other than Detective Conan is on the scene.
22	"Red Tear"; Transliteration: "Reddo Tiā" (Japanese: レッド.ティアー)	March 14, 2015
Kaito abandons his plan to steal the Red Tear after recalling his father's warning about the gem. However, he soon realizes that Snake is tailing the Red Tear's owner, Jody Hopper, and concludes that the organization is targeting it.
23	"Midnight Crow (Part 1): His Name is Phantom Thief Corbeau!"; Transliteration: "Middonaito Kurō (Zenpen) Sono Na ha Kaitō Korubō!" (Japanese: 真夜中の烏《ミッドナイト・クロウ》《前編》 その名は怪盗コルボー！)	March 21, 2015
Kaito Kid is challenged by Kaito Corbeau, a phantom thief who wears a black version of Kid's costume. Kid agrees, but if he fails, he'll have to retire as a phantom thief.
24	"Midnight Crow (Part 2): Clash! Black or White!?"; Transliteration: "Middonaito Kurō (Kōhen) Gekitotsu! Shiro ka Kuro ka!?" (Japanese: 真夜中の烏《ミッドナイト・クロウ》《後編》 激突！白か黒か！？)	March 28, 2015
Kid goes up against the enigmatic Corbeau one more time as they vie for the jewel that may contain Pandora.
