= Yukiko Iwai (voice actress) =

Japanese voice actress

- 岩居 由希子
- Born: January 13, 1972 (age 54)
- Occupation: Voice Actress
- Notable credits: Detective Conan as Ayumi Yoshida

Yukiko Iwai (岩居 由希子, Iwai Yukiko; born January 13, 1972) is a Japanese voice actress who is best known for her voice role as Ayumi Yoshida in Detective Conan. She was born in Chiba.

== Roles ==
=== Anime ===
==== 1995 ====
- Ping Pong Club - Junko Hoshino
- Saint Tail - female student (ep 5); first year girl A (ep 11)

==== 1996 ====
- Detective Conan - Ayumi Yoshida
- Brave Command Dagwon - Woman

==== 1997 ====
- Kindaichi Shounen no Jikenbo - Chie Hirashima/Keiko Horiguchi/Yuu Tokihara
- Manmaru the Ninja Penguin - Harigawa

==== 2001 ====
- The SoulTaker - Kasumi Shiina

==== 2002 ====
- GetBackers - Kakei Sakura

==== 2003 ====
- Mujin Wakusei Survive - Luna

==== 2004 ====
- Ragnarok the Animation - Hana Tsukiyo
- Tsuki wa Higashi ni Hi wa Nishi ni: Operation Sanctuary - Kyouko Nishina
- Girls Bravo - Nanae-Kuh-Haruka

==== 2005 ====
- Kotenkotenko - Bagworm

==== 2006 ====
- Going Wild - Monta
- Gift - eternal rainbow - Nami Rio
- Kenichi: The Mightiest Disciple - Makoto Himeno

==== 2007 ====
- Double Duty Nurses - Shinohara Kaname
- Narcissu: Side 2nd - Yuka Akishima

==== 2008 ====
- Hakken Taiken Daisuki! Shimajirō - Rit-chan
- Clannad After Story - Teacher (ep 23)

==== 2011 ====
- Doraemon - Girl
