= Detective Conan: The Eleventh Striker =

- Theatrical release poster
- Kanji: 名探偵コナン 11人目のストライカー
- Revised Hepburn: Meitantei Konan: Jūichininme no Sutoraikā
- Directed by: Kobun Shizuno
- Written by: Kazunari Kouchi
- Based on: Case Closed by Gosho Aoyama
- Produced by: Keiichi Ishiyama; Michihiko Suwa; Mitomu Asai
- Starring: Minami Takayama; Kappei Yamaguchi; Rikiya Koyama; Wakana Yamazaki; Megumi Hayashibara; Naoko Matsui; Yukiko Iwai; Ikue Ohtani; Wataru Takagi; Kenichi Ogata; Atsuko Yuya; Kazuhiko Inoue; Toshio Furukawa; Chafurin
- Cinematography: Eiichi Anzai; Hironobu Hirabayashi; Junya Hayashi; Chie Hozumi
- Edited by: Ikuyo Fujita; Kazuki Kosuda
- Music by: Katsuo Ono; Aki Yokoyama; Masakazu Yokoyama; Hisako Ono; Takao Kondo
- Production company: TMS Entertainment
- Distributed by: Toho
- Release date: April 14, 2012
- Running time: 110 minutes
- Country: Japan
- Language: Japanese
- Box office: $44,068,406

Detective Conan: The Eleventh Striker (名探偵コナン 11人目のストライカー, Meitantei Konan: Jūichininme no Sutoraikā) is the 2012 Japanese animated mystery sports film and the sixteenth film installment of the manga and anime series Case Closed and it was released on April 14, 2012. The plot follows Conan as he deals with a serial bomber.

== Plot ==
The Detective Boys attend a promotional event where the J. League play soccer with children. There, the group are introduced to several people. The next day, the Detective Boys watch the soccer match at Touto Stadium. Kogoro Mori receives a phone call from a bomber who relays the location of a bomb in the form of a riddle. The riddle reads "Blue zebra and blue boy, rain from above, people from below, their left hand, as it is shows, the tree on the left". Ran Mori relays the riddle to Shinichi Kudo allowing Conan to decipher it. The blue zebra and boy refer to the mascots of the teams currently playing at Touto stadium. The rest of the riddle is a play on kanji; The top part of Rain (雨, Ame), bottom part of People (人, Hito), left of Hand (手, Te), Show (示, Shī) as it is, and the left of Tree (木, Ki). Filling in the missing parts of the kanji and adding them together forms the word Electronic Scoreboard (電光掲示板, Denkō Keijiban). With little time to evacuate the spectators, Conan traverses up the infrastructure and arranges the explosives so the scoreboard falls in a safe location.

The Tokyo Metropolitan Police Department work with Kogoro to find out the bomber's identity. Conan reveals the bomber revealed information only the people they acquainted with during the promotion event would know, limiting the suspects down to five. Kogoro receives a letter from the bomber stating a larger crowd will witness the next bombing and a second letter will arrive later to reveal the location of the next bomb. The police speculate Shiodome Arena is the next target as it is the closest event with the largest attending audience. The second letter arrives and reveals the J. League All-Star Soccer is the next target as it has the highest viewership. The letter declares in all ten simultaneous games, the strikers must use the following play hidden in the letter against the home team to stop the bomb and challenges Kogoro to confront him as the eleventh striker. Conan reveals the border and the staple matches a football pitch and the kanji written in red is written in a way so that the staple has red markings on top of it; He deduces the bomber wants the strikers to kick the ball in the center of the goal post. As per the letter, the police are only able to alert the coaches and the strikers in each game about the bombs.

The strikers in nine matches successfully hit the cross bar to deactivate the bombs, while the remaining sensor in National Stadium has apparently malfunctioned. The police visit Keiichirō Motoura who they believe has a strong motive to be the bomber. Motoura confesses he holds hatred towards Kogoro and fans of the J. League All-Star Soccer games since they stalled the ambulance his dying son, Tomofumi Motoura, was in and blamed them for his death. Kogoro reveals the group mistakenly believed the ambulance they called was for a collapsed elder and attempted to charter the ambulance to their direction. Motoura however reveals he is not the bomber. Conan watches a video of Tomofumi playing soccer and realizes Kazumasa Nakaoka is the culprit. Conan then leaves to Touto stadium to confront Nakaoka.

There, Nakaoka reveals his brotherly relationship with Tomofumi and how he also believes Kogoro and the J. League All-Star Soccer fans were the cause of Tomofumi's death. Nakaoka also reveals that Conan's deduction contain a big flaw: the sensor activating the bomb in National Stadium actually sits in the cross bar of Touto stadium, which will detonate 35 minutes after all the matches finished, destroying both Touto and National Stadium. His original plan is to have Kogoro Mouri solve the riddle, coming to Touto Stadium and have the explosion killing Mouri, himself, and all the people in National Stadium. However, in the end, only Conan and the Detective Boys arrived, but they were not in time to stop the initial explosions in Touto Stadium. Conan attempts to kick the ball to the goal post but is blocked by falling debris. The Detective Boys give Conan a second ball allowing him to make the shot and stop the explosions.

== Cast ==
- Minami Takayama as Conan Edogawa
- Kappei Yamaguchi as Shinichi Kudo
- Rikiya Koyama as Kogoro Mori
- Wakana Yamazaki as Ran Mori
- Hiroyuki Yoshino as Sanada Takahiro
- Megumi Hayashibara as Ai Haibara
- Naoko Matsui as Sonoko Suzuki
- Kazuhiko Inoue as Ninzaburo Shiratori
- Kenichi Ogata as Professor Agasa
- Chafurin as Inspector Megure
- Toshio Furukawa as Misao Yamamura
- Wataru Takagi as Genta Kojima and Officer Takagi
- Yukiko Iwai as Ayumi Yoshida
- Ikue Ohtani as Mitsuhiko Tsuburaya
- Atsuko Yuya as Miwako Satō

== Production ==
The film was officially revealed through the 52nd 2011 edition of Weekly Shōnen Sunday. The official website was opened on November 26, 2011. The film is a collaboration with the J. League Division 1 to commemorate its twentieth anniversary. As part of the collaboration, players from the J. League voiced original characters in the film. On February 22, 2012, the theme song was revealed to be Spring Song (ハルウタ, Haru Uta) performed by Ikimono-gakari. The crowd noise is a recording from the 2012 Japanese Super Cup.

== Box office ==
The Eleventh Striker opened to positive reviews and was the highest grossing Case Closed film till 2012 and earned on its way to an eventual final total of 3.29 billion yen at Japan box office. Starting from this film, each Case Closed film has grossed more money than its predecessors.

== TV Premiere ==
The film aired on Nippon TV on Friday, April 19, 2013, at 9:00 p.m. and earned an 11.4% rating and topped charts off on TV premiere.

== Home media ==
Detective Conan: The Eleventh Striker was released on November 21, 2012, in DVD and Blu-ray, and was a hit among the Best Selling DVD & Blu-Ray in Oricon Charts Ranking.
