= List of Detective Conan live action drama episodes =

The live action drama series Meitantei Conan (名探偵コナン, lit. Great Detective Conan, officially translated as Detective Conan), also known as Case Closed, is based on the manga of the same name. As of 2012, four television specials and a TV series were made.

The first television special was titled, "Meitantei Conan: Kudo Shinichi he no Chosenjo" (名探偵コナン- 工藤新一への挑戦状, lit. Detective Conan: Shinichi Kudo's Written Challenge) and was aired on October 2, 2006. The story follows Shinichi Kudo as he investigates a kidnapping aboard a cruise ship. It features Shun Oguri as the teenage Kudo and Tomoka Kurokawa as Ran Mori. The second television special, entitled "Kudo Shinichi no Fukkatsu! Kuro no Soshiki to no Taiketsu" (工藤新一の復活!〜黒の組織との対決, lit. Shinichi Kudo Returns! Showdown with the Black Organization), aired on December 17, 2007. The plot follows Kudo and Shiho Miyano as they hide from the Black Organization.

A third TV special entitled, "Kudo Shinichi he no Chosenjo: Kaitori Densetsu no Nazo" (工藤新一への挑戦状～怪鳥伝説の謎～, lit. Shinichi Kudo's Written Challenge! The Mystery of the Legendary Strange Bird), aired on April 15, 2011, and featured Junpei Mizobata as Shinichi Kudo and Shioli Kutsuna as Ran Mori. The plot follows Kudo's investigation on murders that are blamed on a mythical bird. The fourth TV special, titled Kudō Shin'ichi Kyōto Shinsengumi Satsujin Jiken (工藤新一京都新撰組殺人事件, Shinichi Kudo and the Kyoto Shinsengumi Murder Case) aired on April 12, 2012. The plot follows Kudo's investigation of a murder on a plane and later in Kyoto.

The cast from the third TV special was used for the TV series, "Kudo Shinichi he no Chosenjo" (工藤新一への挑戦状, lit. Shinichi Kudo's Written Challenge) which aired between July 7, 2011, and September 29, 2011. It follows Shinichi, Ran and Kogoro Mori as they wake up trapped in a room by a crazed fan who admires Shinichi's abilities. Each room contains a device which when a keyword connected to the case is entered, grants them further access of the room. The live action series is produced by Yoshinori Horiguchi, Shi Shirakawa, Koki Endo, and Masako Kuraibu with music by Koji Endo. The theme music used is Kimi to Zutto... (君とずっと..., lit. "Always with you...") performed by Yu-Yu (Rhythm Zone).

== Episodes ==
=== TV specials ===
No.	Title	Original release date
1	"Detective Conan: The Letter of Challenge"; Transliteration: "Meitantei Conan: Kudo Shinichi he no Chosenjo" (Japanese: 名探偵コナン- 工藤新一への挑戦状)	October 2, 2006
2	"Detective Conan: Confrontation with the Men in Black"; Transliteration: "Kudo Shinichi no Fukkatsu! Kuro no Soshiki to no Taiketsu" (Japanese: 工藤新一の復活!〜黒の組織との対決)	December 17, 2007
3	"Detective Conan: The Mystery of the Legendary Monster Bird"; Transliteration: "Kudo Shinichi he no Chosenjo: Kaitori Densetsu no Nazo" (Japanese: 工藤新一への挑戦状～怪鳥伝説の謎～)	April 15, 2011
4	"Detective Conan: Kyoto Shinsengumi Murder Case"; Transliteration: "Kudō Shin'ichi Kyōto Shinsengumi Satsujin Jiken" (Japanese: 工藤新一京都新撰組殺人事件)	April 12, 2012

=== Kudo Shinichi he no Chosenjou ===
No.	Title	Original release date	Rating
1	"The High School Detective Before Becoming Conan, Uncovering the Mystery of the Murder!"; Transliteration: "Conan ni naru mae no Koukousei Tantei ga, Furin Satsujin no Nazo o abaku!" (Japanese: コナンになる前の高校生探偵が、不倫殺人の謎を暴く!)	July 7, 2011	5.7
The episode starts when Shinichi, Ran, and Kogoro wake up trapped in a white cubical cell with no recollection of how they arrived there. A letter in the room reveals that an admirer of Shinichi's detective work placed him there to test his deduction abilities. Soon, a panel in the room turns on, revealing with the date June 24, 2010 and a password to key in. Shinichi recalls an investigation that occurred on that day, when a famous photographer murders his lover. The case starts where the famous photographer, Tsubochi Yuhei and Kishi Kousuke was hit by an unknown robber after murdering a model, Aida Momoko who turns out to be Tsubochi's lover. However, Shinichi uncovers the truth that Tsubochi staged a robbery scene to hide the fact that he murdered his own beloved because he assumes she cheated on him with another man. Shinichi also reveals that he killed her due to a misunderstanding as the pictures in Aida's camera reveal a hidden message saying that she still loves him. Back in the white room, Shinichi keys in the word "I love you" and the door opens. However, it leads to another room with the same panel only with the date September 2, 2010 and a levitating spoon in the center of the room.
2	"Locked Room Murder on Live Broadcast! Exposing the Secret Curse"; Transliteration: "Namahousou de oki ta Misshitsu Satsujin! Chou Nouryoku Sha no Norowa Re Ta Himitsu o abake" (Japanese: 生放送で起きた密室殺人! 超能力者の呪われた秘密を暴け)	July 14, 2011	5.4
The Case of September 2, 2010 reveals that it was another murder case in a television program called "The Showdown" where he appears to prove that Washimi Jiro is not a psychic. During the show, after revealing one of Jiro's tricks, the host Harada Takayuki jokingly say Jiro's a fraud and ask him to prove it. Jiro manages proves it to him by strangling him and murder him on the spot. However, Shinichi doesn't believe in ESP despite seeing it. He manages to prove that he wasn't strangled but was poisoned as Harada actually faked being strangled by Jiro's psychic powers. Not satisfied, he uses his powers only to be nearly killed by the falling pillar. Finally Shinichi proves to everyone that Hayashi Seiko murdered Harada and framed Jiro by slipping him the weapon during Shinichi's demonstration of the strangling trick. The motive was she was supposed to be Harada's assistant after working for 7 years with him but Mizutani Aiko was his assistant instead. Despite admitting her murder, Jiro was not satisfied and tells everyone his psychic powers are real, while everyone leaves the stage, leaving him behind not knowing that a bent nail has reshaped itself. Back in the white room, they manage to open another door after keying in the panel "Dokkiri" and enter the third white room, only this time there were multiple gunshots while the panel shows July 9, 2010, as Kogoro remembers that case.
3	"Murder Case that Happened in a Locked Court Room! Revealing the Murder Trick to Kill the Hostess"; Transliteration: "Misshitsu Hōtei de Okita Satsujin Jiken! Hosutesu Satsugai torikku o Abake" (Japanese: 密室法廷で起きた殺人事件! ホステス殺害トリックを暴け)	July 21, 2011	4.4
The date turns out to be Eri becoming a murder suspect, which Kogoro tries to forget that disgusting day. It was the day that Eri appears as a witness for a trial of a theft case of Saito Reika, a hostess working at Mint Rose bar, who was charge for stealing 10 million yen at her working safe. During that, it was the 3rd day of the trial, once Eri gives her testimony, Reika insults her. Eri uses her hand and pretends to shoot her, however Eri was terrified to see that Reika was really shot in the head. Convinced, Eri decides to threaten everyone that she's going to shoot everyone in the courtroom, however, after hearing her words, Shinichi realizes it is a hidden message. Shinichi plays along with Eri, making her as the prime suspect of the murder, both manage to make prosecutor Kamikawa Takumi say something that he shouldn't be saying, which proves to everyone that he's the real murderer. The weapon happens to be a gun that looks like a lipstick in which Takumi shoots her without anyone suspecting a thing and during the commotion, he tossed the weapon at Eri. However, Eri figures out that the lipstick she picked up was still hot and decides to give it to Shinichi after giving him a hidden message from her words. The motive of the murder was that Takumi was charged for tax-evasion against the love hotel "Peach-Peach Group" recently. Takumi assume that Reika was in love with him until she was arrested and happened to work at the same love hotel. She stole the money for his sake and threatened him if she goes to jail, she'll expose everything during that day. Back at the white room, Ran was not happy about his father during the case while Shinichi keys in lipstick at the panel to open the next room. The next room reveal a panel showing 31 May 2010 and a wedding dress appears out of nowhere behind the panel. Shinichi notes it's the case where Kogoro screws up the wedding and the bride's friend gets murdered.
4	"Perfect Crime! Murder Notice during a Wedding, Exposing the Mystery of the Locked Room Poisoning!"; Transliteration: "Kanzen Hanzai! Kekkonshiki de Satsujin Yokoku, Misshitsu Dokusatsu Torikku no Nazo o Abake!" (Japanese: 完全犯罪! 結婚式で殺人予告、密室毒殺トリックの謎を暴け!)	July 28, 2011	5.6
Continuing from the previous episode, Shinichi added that because of Kogoro's idea to give a kiss to the bride and groom, someone died. However, Kogoro counters him back that Shinichi was also going to get HIS first kiss, which makes Ran gets suspicious about it. Before the case starts, Ran and Sonoko manage to win Shinichi (by cheating) and his penalty is to accept any favors from anyone for the whole day. Suddenly, Kogoro calls in that he needs his help to go on a deep-undercover investigation, which he realize a bit too late as he realize it's a ruse. Turns out that a married couple, Motoki Kensuke and Shimabara Kanon are celebrating their marriage in Kensuke's restaurant 'Diavel's Kiss' and Kogoro asks him to help him make preparations for the wedding. Not breaking Ran's promise, he does so. During his time, he receives a threat telegram that was supposed to be for one of the couples. As the wedding starts, after his speech, he ask the couples to kiss while Shinichi was still thinking that the telegram was just a prank. However, one of the guest, Masumoto Nana, who was drunk, dies from poison after drinking some of the guests' drinks. As Sato and Takagi arrived at the scene, it was revealed that Nana died from allergic reaction to soba. After further investigation, Shinichi finally reveals that the culprit was the bride Kanon. Kanon figures out that Kensuke's having an affair with Nana so before the kissing ceremony, she eats curry with soba in it and uses Kensuke after giving a kiss to him, transferring the soba to Kensuke's lips. Before being taken away by the police, Kogoro lectures Kanon that Nana had envied her due to being in love with a man Kanon truly loves as both Nana and Kanon hold a complex to each other. If both have quarrel and more honest, both of them would be true friends in the end than having grudges towards each other. Suddenly, after the case is over, Ran came over hearing about the 'kiss' part and beats both Shinichi and her father down. Back in the white room, he keys in the 'Kiss' Word and the door opens. As they enter the room, the panel shows with a question "Last year which day did you first eat saury?" with a 30 second time limit. Shinichi keys in 25 September 2010 and the timer starts with another question "When was the last day you drank tea?". However as Shinichi tries to remember, the timer runs out as the episode ends when the whole room turns dark.
5	"Perfect Crime When Preventing the Summer Heat, Great Murder Trick of the Actress Who Erased Her Memory"; Transliteration: "Kioku o Keshita Joyū no Kareinaru Satsujin Torikku Hisho-chi de no Kanzen Hanzai" (Japanese: 記憶を消した女優の華麗なる殺人トリック 避暑地での完全犯罪)	August 4, 2011	4.6
As soon the room turns dark, fortunately the panel shows 12 August 2010 just before the time ran out and the room turns bright again. However, he didn't key in anything but Shinichi remembers the sad incident at the famous film director's villa. It was during the day where Shinichi and Ran were invited to act as supporting characters for the upcoming movie for Nagata Akihiro. During the break, he was caught kissing newcomer actress Ikutsuki Saori by his wife, Nagata Chisato and nearly breaking a fight with her, nearly attempting to kill Saori with a knife. After the argument been settled, everyone is treated with a cup of tea, only to witness Akihiro die from poisoning. Shinichi deduces that he died from potassium cyanide in his tea. Soon Shinichi places a trap and proves that the culprit is Ishihara Kana, the villa's manager. Turns out that all of the tea cups were placed with potassium cyanide only the differences are that she placed it at a certain portion where only left handed people would get killed, which Akihiro happens to be a lefty. It also reveals that Kana happens to be Kimura Keisukue's wife who was having an affair with Chisato as it was proven due to her bracelet. Because of that incident, Kimura was driven to death as his dreams of being an actor was shattered. After revealing that, Chisato reveals that Kimura was no use to him and she could be very popular in the end. Back in the white room, unable to solve, the panel change to a date 12 August 2010 with the password, which Shinichi keys in "actress". Shinichi was confused as how the true culprit knows about his details. As soon as they enter the next room, Ran was shot by a poisonous dart and the panel writes "If she isn't given an antidote on time, she'll die" and shows 10 June 2010 with a 5 minute time limit.
6	"Splendid Murder of the Kisses From the Twenty Beauties! Murderous Intent Hidden in the Murder Equation!"; Transliteration: "Bijo 20-nin no Kareinaru Koroshi no Kisu! Satsujin Hōteishiki Ni Kakusa Reta Satsui!" (Japanese: 美女20人の華麗なる殺しのキス! 殺人方程式に隠された殺意!)	August 11, 2011	4.8
Continuing from the previous episode, Shinichi tries to remember what was the case of that specific date and then remembers the case in the cabaret club. The case begins where Ran and Shinichi in disguise were spying on Kogoro with Takagi (since they need access to the club). They notice a famous professor, Mine Mashito with Kumi while Kogoro with Kyoko. Soon it was game time, Kiss-Kiss Derby in which both Kogoro and Mashito was selected. The game rules are that both men takes turns, receiving kisses from the 20 ladies who are lined up then pour wine into their glasses. The winner will be given a special kiss from Kumi. During the game, both men get kisses from the ladies (which infuriates Ran). The winner happens to be Mine and once Kumi drank the wine, she was about to kiss when she collapses. Shinichi checks on her and sadly she has already died. During investigation, it reveals that Kumi has died from drinking wolf's bane that was inside Kyoko's container. However, Kyoko denies it as she doesn't know it at all. Shinichi notices the line-up draw on the white board and sees that Kyoko was No.16. He deduces that the culprit must be a whiz in maths since the game only lets the contestants choose between 1 and 3, there's higher chances that the poison was in Kyoko's wine. Oddly, all the girls seem to be very happy that Kumi's gone, even going so far as to take down the picture. As the investigation progresses, Kogoro suspects it was Mashito but Shinichi proves that it was Kazuyo who poisoned Kumi. The proof is that she knows one of the lines that mathematician Rene Descartes says, in which Mine knows about it since Mashito told her. Her motive was that she had fallen in love with Mashito since last Christmas as she's the only person who talk as serious as she does. However, she overhears Kumi's conversation that she's planning to cheat Mashito with his money and plans to murder Kumi to protect Mashito. As she's been taken away while Mashito cried in grief, Kogoro noted that Kazuyo learns maths just for Mashito so she'll used him to make him remember her for all his life as lover. He even added that a woman's heart can't be calculated by maths, which leads Shinichi to be confused. Back in the white room, Shinichi keys in Descartes and a small room opens with the antidote with it. However, just as soon Kogoro grabs it, it begins to close. He manages to pass the antidote to Shinichi, telling him to protect Ran as the door completely closes. As Ran is saved, the panel disappears and a balloon begins to inflate the room, as it's trying to suffociate them.
7	"The Blood Painted Bone Murder for Inheritance! Revealing the Mystery of the Kidnapping Trick!"; Transliteration: "Chi Nura Reta Kotsuniku no Isan Sōzoku Satsujin! Yūkai Torikku no Nazo o Abake!" (Japanese: 血ぬられた骨肉の遺産相続殺人! 誘拐トリックのナゾを暴け!)	August 18, 2011	4.8
Continuing from the last episode, Shinichi and Ran found the monitor panel with the date 27 May 2010. The case starts in a ramen shop where Shinichi and Ran were watching a fight between Noguchi Miki and Yuri at their father's funeral since Sonoko attended it since her dad was a close friend with him. Suddenly, Ran receives a call that Sonoko's been kidnapped. As soon as they arrived at the Hyogoro Ramen Headquarters, they were briefed by Miki that she got an anonymous call that her sister has been kidnapped along with Sonoko and demand 10 billion diamonds for their lives. Once they fulfilled the demands and oddly the diamonds disappeared without the kidnapper appearing, they receive a letter inside the box that they've received it and will release the hostages at Beika's Central Park and later directed them to the Headquarters underground depot. As soon as they rescued the hostages, they realize that Miki was strangled to death when they left her. After further investigation, Shinichi figures out that Miki was the true kidnapper to have the diamonds for herself however, Yuri murdered her sister since she was in cahoots with her plan. The proof is that one of the assistants picks up a bead that happens to be from Miki's necklace during the rescue in the underground depot. Yuri confesses however she told him that Miki was the one who plans it and probably left a dying message before she dies. Shinichi notices a strange sound at the air vent and opens it, as countless diamonds falls off from it. Shinichi keys in 'Diamond' and the balloon deflates a bit and explode. As they both enter the next room, they feel a bit of electric shock and they both realize if they don't solve the next panel, both of them will be electrocuted.
8	"Stubborn Girl, revenge on Molestation Crime! Murder Trick Hidden in the Surveillance Camera."; Transliteration: "On'na no Iji, Chikan-han e no Fukushū! Kanshi Kamera ni Himeta Satsujin Torikku" (Japanese: 女の意地、痴漢犯への復讐!監視カメラに秘めた殺人トリック)	August 25, 2011	5.2
Shinichi and Ran are riding a bus in Beika when Ran is suddenly touched on her butt by molester Osamu Sawada. After chasing the molester, Shinichi and Ran come across a case at the Beika Residence apartments where Katsuyo Miyano's respirator ceased working and she lies between life and death. Is Makoto Yamashita responsible for the respirator trouble through neglect or is there more to this case, and what does Sawada's obsession with Yukari Miyano's black underwear have to do with anything?
9	"Heiji Hattori and the Mystery of the Hidden Locked Room Murder Weapon! The Reasoning Battle of the East and West Detectives"; Transliteration: "Hattori Heiji to Misshitsu Satsujin Mienai Kyōki no Nazo! Tōzai Tantei Suiri Batoru" (Japanese: 服部平次と密室殺人見えない凶器のナゾ! 東西探偵推理バトル)	September 1, 2011	5.9
Osakan high school detective Heiji Hattori and his best friend Kazuha Toyama are on their way to visit Teitan High School when they witness a thief steal a purse. Heiji chases after the thief only to run past Shinichi and Ran on their way back from school. They capture the thief only to suddenly hear a woman scream in a nearby house. When owner Yoshino Fujimaru gets home and lets them in, the three are surprised to find Hideko Nakajima dead on a couch with a shard of glass protruding from her neck.
10	"The Mystery of the Corpse That Teleported 200KM! Revealing the Wicked Woman's Perfect Crime"; Transliteration: "200 Kiro o Shunkan Idō Shita Shitai no Nazo! Akujo no Kanzen Hanzai Keikaku o Abake" (Japanese: 200キロを瞬間移動した死体の謎! 悪女の完全犯罪計画を暴け)	September 8, 2011	4.0
Ran video-chats with Yukino Mizutani, Kogoro's client who apparently is under domestic abuse and being stalked by her lover, Kensuke Kubo. In the middle of the conversation, Yukino seems to be attacked by Kubo and screams for help. Ran calls Shinichi to Beika Mansion where Yukino lives; rushing there, she bumps into Kubo and later deduces that he is the culprit. However, Yukino is nowhere to be found – her corpse is discovered 6 hours later at a weekly mansion in Saitama, which is 200 km far from Beika Mansion; therefore, it's impossible for Kubo to be the culprit.
11	"Kiss Is the Reason for Killing, Murder for revenge After 20 Years! Mystery of a Perfect Alibi"; Transliteration: "Kisu wa Koroshi no Riyū, 20-nen-go no Fukushū Satsujin! Kanpekina Aribai no Nazo" (Japanese: キスは殺しの理由、20年後の復讐殺人! 完璧なアリバイの謎)	September 15, 2011	5.4
Shinichi invites Ran to have dinner in the restaurant on the 38th floor of the Beika Center Building for a reason. Meanwhile, a murder occurs: the victim is Taiji Tatsumi, the president of the Games company. Shinichi suspects the director of Games, Satoru Oba, but he has been with the president's daughter, Sakurako Tatsumi, all the time. Can Shinichi solve the case and go back to confess his intention to the waiting Ran on time?
12	"I have killed! Three Lone Murderers? Revealing the Disguise of the Murder Mystery!"; Transliteration: "Watashi ga Koroshimashita! 3-Nin no Tandoku-han? Gisō Satsujin no Nazo o Abake!" (Japanese: 私が殺しました! 3人の単独犯? 偽装殺人の謎を暴け!)	September 22, 2011	4.6
Machiko Sonoda, Ran's computer school teacher and Kogoro's drinking buddy, is found lying still – presumably dead – behind the closed shutter of Beika City Bank's safe-deposit box floor. There is a warning – the moment the shutter is open or the police make a move, the bank will be exploded. When asked for the murder culprit, all three suspects – Yuzo Nimura, Yoko Sakai and Ryosuke Hasegawa – raise their hands. Can Shinichi find the true culprit and prevent the 'explosion'?
13	"Ran's Death! Genius Detective Revealing the Last Mystery of the True Criminal's White Room Challenge"; Transliteration: "Ran shisu! Shinhan'nin ga Tensai Tantei e Saigo no Chōsen Shiroi Heya no Nazo o Abake" (Japanese: 蘭死す! 真犯人が天才探偵へ最後の挑戦 白い部屋の謎を暴け)	September 29, 2011	4.4
Right after Ran admits being the criminal behind everything, she and Shinichi are separated and put to sleep. Hearing Takagi's voice, Shinichi wakes up, finding himself at Beika Marina and Ran lying still nearby. However, Ran is declared dead by a Medical Examiner named Hajime Hirata, and will be dissected to find out the cause of death; Shinichi can't do anything, being taken to the police station as an important witness. He and Kogoro later deduce Ran is only in an "apparent death" condition and may be revived. Will Shinichi be able to locate the true culprit of the white room? More important, can he save Ran?
