= Shioli Kutsuna =

Japanese actress (born 1992)

- 忽那 汐里
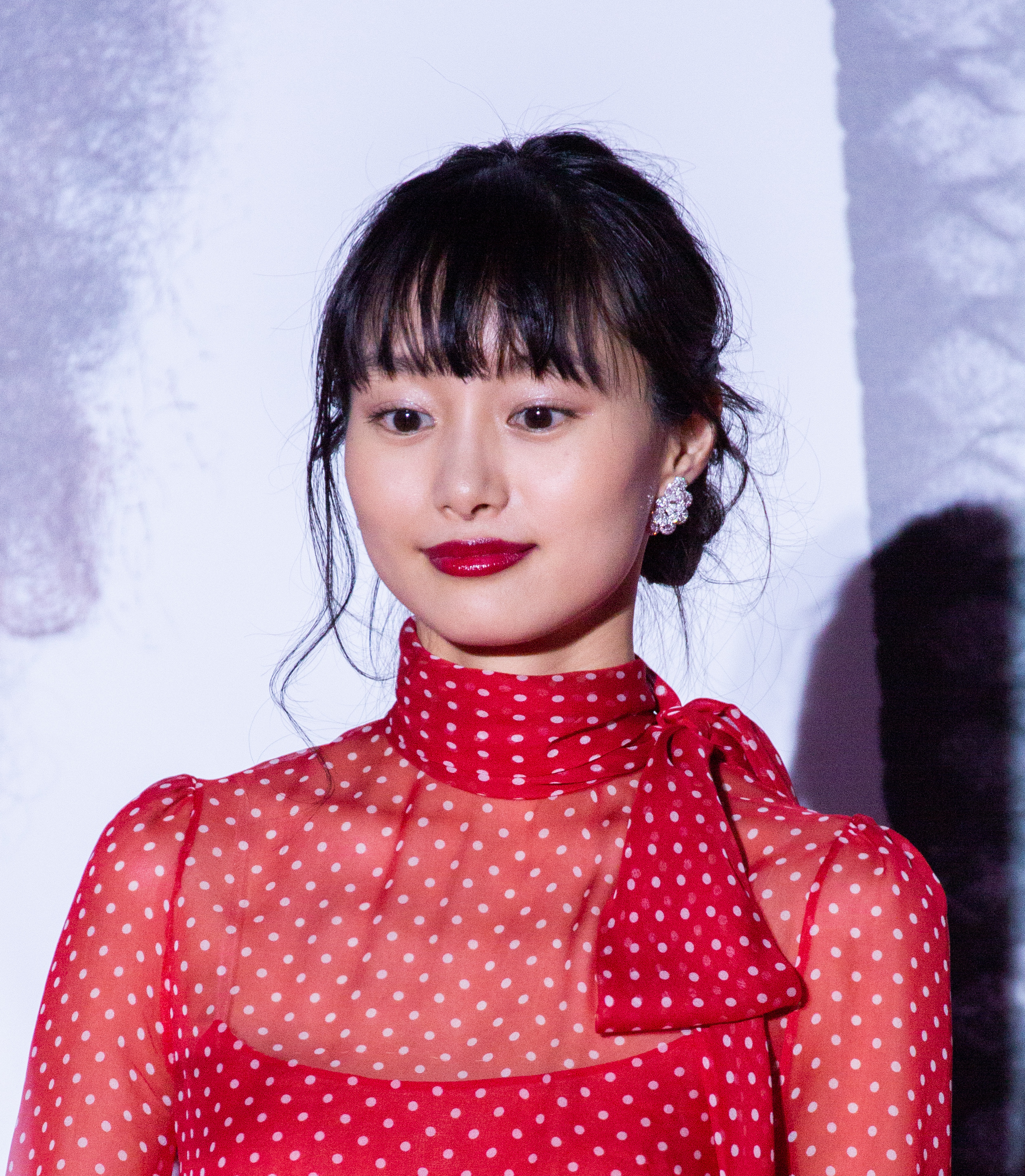
- Kutsuna in 2018
- Born: 22 December 1992 (age 33); Sydney, New South Wales, Australia
- Other name: Shiori Kutsuna
- Education: Horikoshi High School
- Occupation: Actress
- Years active: 2006–present
- Hometown: Japan

Japanese name
- Kanji: 忽那 汐里
- Hiragana: くつな しおり
- Katakana: クツナ シオリ
Transcriptions
- Romanization: Kutsuna Shiori

Shioli Kutsuna (Japanese: 忽那 汐里, Hepburn: Kutsuna Shiori; born December 22, 1992) is an Australian-born Japanese actress, known for her role as Ran Mori in Shinichi Kudo's Written Challenge!, Minami Maho in Beck (2010), Haru/Harumi in 125 Years Memory (2015), Yuki "Yukio" ("Yuki O.") Ohara in Deadpool 2 (2018) and Deadpool & Wolverine (2024), and Rainy in the video game Death Stranding 2: On the Beach (2025). She plays Mitsuki in the Apple TV+ series Invasion (2021). In 2014, she won the Japan Academy Film Prize for Newcomer of the Year and is critically acclaimed in Japan and globally.

== Early life and education ==
Kutsuna was born in Killarney Heights, Sydney to Japanese parents. She lived in Australia until the age of 14 before moving to Japan to pursue a career as a model and actress.

In 2011, Kutsuna graduated from Horikoshi High School, alongside fellow actresses Mayuko Kawakita and Riko Narumi.

In 2013, she dropped out of college before starting her third year, for the sake of her career. Her agency said, "It really was difficult for her to work while going to school. She had a hard time attending classes due to her work in dramas. She accepted this and dropped out. She will now be focusing on her acting career".

== Career ==
In 2006, she traveled to Japan from Sydney during her school winter break. While there, she took part in the 2006 Japan Bishōjo Contest hosted by the talent agency Oscar Promotion, and she went on to win the Judge’s Prize.

In 2009, she obtained her first major starring role, playing the part of Tsugumi Nitobe in 70 000 People Detective Nitobe, an ordinary college student who has 70,000 friends on the Internet and solves difficult cases by using their brains.

In 2011, she was cast to play Ran Mori in a special drama for the live-action of Detective Conan, a popular manga series written by Gosho Aoyama. She replaced Tomoka Kurokawa, who played Ran in the previous specials in 2006 and 2007.

In 2012, she was named Best New Actress of 2011 by film magazine Kinema Junpo.

In 2015, she appeared in two leading roles as Haru/Harumi in the Japanese-Turkish co-production 125 Years Memory. Originally only focusing her career in Japan, she was encouraged by director Wayne Wang, whom she worked with on a 2016 film, to "try breaking into Hollywood", so she gradually began expanding her work overseas.

She played mutant Yuki "Yukio" ("Yuki O.") Ohara in the 2018 film Deadpool 2, the eleventh installment of the X-Men film series. She reprised the role in the 2024 Marvel Cinematic Universe (MCU) sequel Deadpool & Wolverine.

In 2021, she appeared in the first season of Apple TV+ series Invasion, the second season which premiered in August 2023, and the third season of 2025.

In 2022, it was revealed that she would appear in Hideo Kojima's 2025 videogame Death Stranding 2: On the Beach. She plays the character Rainy.

Since 2024, Kutsuna has based her acting career in America while also continuing to appear in Japanese productions.

== Filmography ==
Key
†	Denotes films that have not yet been released

=== Film ===
Year	Title	Role	Notes	Ref.
2009	Guardian Angel	Ryoko		
2010	Chonmage Purin			
2010	Beck	Minami Maho		
2011	My Back Pages	Mako Kurata		
2011	Shojotachi no Rashinban	Eshima Ran		
2012	The Life of Guskou Budori	Neri (voice)	Japanese-language version	
2013	Petal Dance	Haraki		
2013	Before The Vigil	Machiko Yamada		
2013	Unforgiven	Natsume		
2014	Oh! Father	Taeko		
2015	125 Years Memory	Haru/Harumi		
2016	While the Women Are Sleeping	Miki		
2016	Kingsglaive: Final Fantasy XV	Lunafreya Nox Fleuret	Japanese-language version	
2017	Kiseki: Sobito of That Day	Rika		
2017	Cat Collector's House	Michiru Towada		
2017	Oh Lucy!	Mika Ogawa		
2018	The Outsider	Miyu		
2018	Deadpool 2	Yuki "Yukio" ("Yuki O.") Ohara	Also Japanese-language version	
2019	Murder Mystery	Suzi Nakamura		
2024	Deadpool & Wolverine	Yuki "Yukio" ("Yuki O.") Ohara	Also Japanese-language version	
2026	Her Private Hell	Ms. T		
TBA	Gundam †			

=== Television ===
Year	Title	Role	Notes	Ref.
2007	3 nen B gumi Kinpachi Sensei 8	Akiko Kanai		
2008	Homeroom on the Beachside	Risa Fujisawa		
2009	Mei-chan no Shitsuji	Amo Rin		
2009	70 000 People Detective Nitobe	Tsugumi Nitobe		
2009	The Witch Trial	Haruka Kashiwagi		
2009	Shōkōjo Seira	Kaori Mizushima		
2010	Graduation Song	Mami Sato		
2011	3 nen B gumi Kinpachi Sensei: Final	Kanai Akiko	Television film	
2011	Jidankoshonin Gota Keshi	Ayano Sakura		
2011	Gō	Sen	Taiga drama	
2011	Shinichi Kudo's Written Challenge	Ran Mori		
2011	I'm Mita, Your Housekeeper.	Yui Asuda		
2011	The Mystery of the Legendary Strange Bird	Ran Mori	Television film	
2012	Shinichi Kudo and the Kyoto Shinsengumi Murder Case	Ran Mori	Television film	
2012	O-Parts	Yuki Miyamae		
2012	Tales of the Unusual: Spring 2012: "Changing Room"	Misa Kashiwagi	Short drama	
2012	20nen-go no Kimi e	Mariko Sawada	Television film	
2012	Single Mothers	Yukino Kijima		
2013	Nakuna, Hara-chan	Kiyomi Konno		
2013	The Family Game	Sara Mizukawa / Maika Asami / Maki Tachibana		
2013	Machiisha Jumbo!!	Asuka Baba		
2014	Nezumi, Edo wo Hashiru	Kosode		
2014	Bitter Blood	Hitomi Maeda		
2014	Ukai ni Koishita Natsu	Yuzu Tachibana	Television film	
2016	Kamogawa Shokudo	Koishi Kamogawa		
2017	1942-nen no Play Ball	Kimiko	Television film	
2021–present	Invasion	Mitsuki Yamato		
2023	Sanctuary	Asuka Kunishima		

=== Video games ===
Year	Title	Role	Notes	Ref.
2013	Professor Layton and the Azran Legacy	Aurora	Japanese-language version	
2025	Death Stranding 2: On the Beach	Rainy	Motion Capture, Japanese and English voice, likeness	

=== Commercials ===
2008

- NTT東日本 DENPO115
- Pocky 2008–2010 (第50 – 51代 Pocky Princess)
- Aera Home クラージュ
- TAKARATOMY Hi-kara

2010

- MOS Burger
- KYOTO KIMONO YUZEN

2011

- SUNTORY Oolong Tea Premium Clear
- dip はたらくスマイルプロジェクト (星野夏子 役)

2012

- Aera Home「環境設計の家」
- DAIHATSU Campaign (ダイハツ キャンペーン)
- カリエ Noz BEASHOW
- EPSON (セイコーエプソン カラリオ)

2013

- Pokka「ヒラメキ宣言」
- Pokka キレートレモン
- LION デンタークリアMAXライオン

2014

- ゲオホールディングス 2nd STREET / JUMBLE STORE
- MOSDO!
- Pokka 企業
- Hay Day (Supercell ヘイ・デイ)

=== Promotional videos ===
- December 11, 2008 ORANGE RANGE Oshare Banchou feat. Soy Sauce 「おしゃれ番長 feat.ソイソース / 中華料理 篇」
- June 17, 2009 ASIA ENGINEER「僕にできる事のすべて」

== Accolades ==
Year	Award	Category	Notable Works	Result	Ref.
2006	11th Japan Bishōjo Contest	Special Jury Prize	Herself	Won	
2010	2nd Tama Cinema Awards	Best Rising Actress	Beck & Looking Up at the Half-Moon	Won	
2010	7th Beauty Week Award	The Best of Beauty	Herself	Won	
2011	85th Kinema Junpo Award	Best New Actress	My Back Pages	Won	
2011	9th Clarino Beautiful Legs Award	Teen Category	Herself	Won	
2011	2nd Japan Wedding Best Dresser Award	Best Wedding Dresser Award	Herself (with Ayame Goriki)	Won	
2012	66th Mainichi Film Awards	Sponichi Grand Prix Newcomer Award	My Back Pages	Won	
2012	54th Blue Ribbon Awards	Best Supporting Actress	—N/a	Nominated	
2012	Japan Natto Cooperative Society	Natto Queen	Herself	Won	
2014	37th Japan Academy Prize	Newcomer of the Year	Unforgiven & Before The Vigil	Won	
2021	Forbes JAPAN 2021	30 Under 30 JAPAN - Entertainment	Herself	Included	
2023	Asia Contents Awards & Global OTT Awards	Best Supporting Actress	Sanctuary	Nominated	
