= Case Closed =

Japanese manga series

- 36th North American volume cover, featuring Conan Edogawa

名探偵コナン (Meitantei Konan)
- Genre: Mystery; Thriller
- Manga
- Written by: Gosho Aoyama
- Published by: Shogakukan
- English publisher: NA: Viz Media; SEA: Shogakukan Asia (Note: As Detective Conan)
- Imprint: Shōnen Sunday Comics
- Magazine: Weekly Shōnen Sunday
- Original run: January 5, 1994 – present
- Volumes: 109
- Anime television series
- Case Closed (1996–present)
- Spin-off manga
- The Culprit Hanzawa; Zero's Tea Time; Police Academy Arc
- icon

Case Closed, also officially known as Detective Conan (Japanese: 名探偵コナン, Hepburn: Meitantei Konan; lit. 'Great Detective Conan'), is a Japanese manga series written and illustrated by Gosho Aoyama. It has been serialized in Shogakukan's shōnen manga magazine Weekly Shōnen Sunday since January 1994; its chapters have been collected in 109 tankōbon volumes as of October 2026. Because of legal problems with the name Detective Conan, several American English language releases were renamed Case Closed. The story follows the high school detective Shinichi Kudo, whose body was transformed into that of an elementary school-age child while investigating a mysterious organization. Generally, he solves a multitude of cases by impersonating his childhood best friend's father and various other characters.

Case Closed is licensed for English-language release in North America by Viz Media, which has published the manga in print since September 2004. It also publishes the series in English on the Viz Manga digital manga service, with the series' chapters receiving simultaneous English publication in North America as they are released in Japan. Shogakukan Asia publishes the manga in English in Singapore and in the Southeast Asian region. It has been adapted into an anime television series adaptation produced by Yomiuri Telecasting Corporation and TMS Entertainment, which began broadcasting in January 1996.

The tankōbon volumes of the manga had over 270 million copies in circulation worldwide by January 2023, making it one of the best-selling manga series of all time. In 2001, the manga was awarded the 46th Shogakukan Manga Award in the shōnen category. It has received a positive response from critics for its plot and cases.

== Plot ==
Jimmy Kudo (Japanese name: Shinichi Kudo) is a high school detective who sometimes works with police to solve cases. During an investigation, he is ambushed and incapacitated by a member of a crime syndicate known as the Black Organization. In an attempt to murder the young detective, they force-feed him a dangerous experimental drug. However, instead of killing him, it shrinks his body to the size of an elementary school child. Adopting the pseudonym Conan Edogawa, Kudo lives with his childhood friend Rachel Moore (Ran Mori) and her father, Richard (Kogoro Mori), who is a private detective. Kudo keeps his real identity secret from most people, but early on confides in family friend and inventor Dr. Agasa, who supplies Kudo with an array of spy gadgets. Throughout the series, young Kudo tags along on Richard's cases. Kudo typically solves them, revealing the culprit by sedating Richard with a tranquilizer dart from his wristwatch and copying Richard's voice with a bowtie gadget. This ruse helps Kudo maintain his cover, but also gives Richard the reputation as a brilliant but narcoleptic detective. Kudo also enrolls in Teitan Elementary School, where he makes friends with a group of classmates who form their own Junior Detective League (Detective Boys). While he continues to dig deeper into the Black Organization, he frequently interacts with other characters, including his neighbor, Dr. Agasa; Rachel's friend Serena Sebastian (Sonoko Suzuki); a fellow teenage detective, Harley Hartwell (Heiji Hattori); assorted police detectives from different regions; and a phantom thief called Kaito Kid.

Kudo later encounters an elementary school transfer student, Anita Hailey (Ai Haibara), who reveals herself to be a former member of the Black Organization under the code name Sherry and the creator of the experimental drug that shrunk him. She too ingested it to evade the pursuit of the organization. She soon joins the Junior Detectives. During a rare encounter with the Black Organization, Conan helps the FBI plant a CIA agent, Kir, inside the Black Organization as a spy.

== Production ==
Case Closed was conceived when Gosho Aoyama was asked to create a mystery manga. This was during the rise of the genre in manga due to the publishing of The Kindaichi Case Files (1992). Aoyama cites the stories of Arsène Lupin, Sherlock Holmes and the samurai films by Akira Kurosawa as influences on his work. Wanting to have a unique element, he came up with "shrinking" a skilled detective. In 2007, he explained that he does not get tired of the series because the mysteries allow him to portray a variety of genres. "If the criminal is an athlete, it feels like a sports story. If they're an actor, it feels like a stage drama. Every time I work with a different world, so it lets me draw things in a way that keeps the story feeling fresh." An online database of all the cases from the manga was launched that year.

Each case spans several chapters (except for a handful of shorter cases that span only one) and is resolved at the end, when characters explain the details of their solutions in simple terms. Aoyama researches and conceives of the "tricks" to the cases together with his editors, which includes testing some of the science experiments and magic tricks himself. His older brother is a scientist who also helps him with the "gimmicks" in the series. With the story and trick determined in meetings with the editors, Aoyama then spends hours in isolation by himself, thinking of the best way to show them in the storyboard. When he starts drawing a rough draft, he considers how much romantic comedy, mystery and human drama to include. When scripting each chapter, he ensures the dialogue remains simple and spends an average of four hours for each new case and twelve for more complicated ones.

In 2007, Aoyama hinted that he had planned an ending but did not intend to end the series yet. Aoyama and his staff decided to computerize their manga creation process in early 2011, although he still draws with a pen and paper. The change began with the final page of chapter 760. In 2015, Aoyama was hospitalized for a surgery, resulting in Case Closed going on its first lengthy hiatus in 21 years. The following year, he reduced his workload by less than half. As of 2023, it took Aoyama two months to create a 64-page story spanning four chapters, with him working 18-hour days. In 2026, Aoyama revealed that he had already drafted the thumbnail layouts (name in Japanese) for the final chapter.

== Media ==
=== Manga ===
Written and illustrated by Gosho Aoyama, Case Closed started its serialization in Shogakukan's shōnen manga magazine Weekly Shōnen Sunday on January 5, 1994. (Note: The series debuted in the magazine's fifth issue of 1994 (cover date January 19), released on January 5 of that same year.) Case Closed became one of the longest running manga series, with over 1,000 chapters released in Japan, and the first series with over 1,000 chapters published in Weekly Shōnen Sunday. Shogakukan has collected its chapters into individual tankōbon volumes. The first volume was released on June 18, 1994. On October 18, 2021, the series reached one hundred volumes; One Piece author, Eiichiro Oda, whose series achieved the same feat a month before, sent congratulations to Aoyama. As of October 16, 2026, 109 volumes have been published.

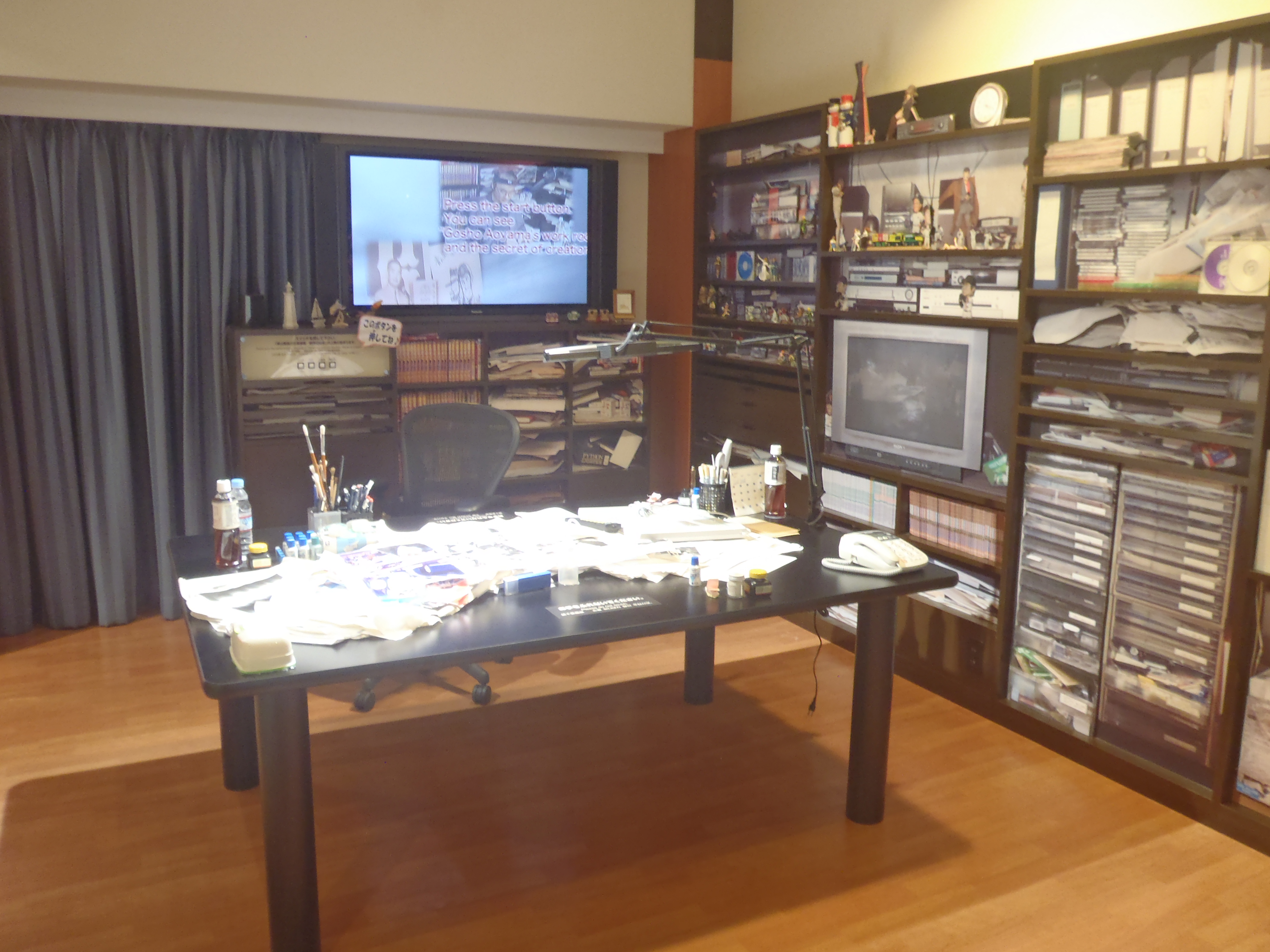
A recreation of Aoyama's workplace at the Gosho Aoyama Manga Factory

Viz Media announced its acquisition of the series for North America on June 1, 2004. Following Funimation's localization, Viz released the series as Case Closed and took their character names to keep consistency between the two media. Viz Media released the first volume in September 2004 and began releasing digital editions in 2013. On May 9, 2023, Viz Media launched their Viz Manga digital manga service, with the series' chapters receiving simultaneous English publication in North America as they are released in Japan. In June 2026, Viz Media announced that it will release the series in a 3-in-1 omnibus edition starting in February 2027, using the original Detective Conan title and character names.

Gollancz licensed and distributed 15 of Viz Media's volumes in the United Kingdom before ceasing publication of manga. (Viz Media has since re-released them). In 2014 Shogakukan Asia began its own English localization of the series for Singapore and other Southeast Asian countries as Detective Conan. Laura Thornton of CBR.com, citing the common Japanese ownership in both Shogakukan Asia and Viz, described the Singapore version as, compared to the Viz one, "completely identical, word-for-word, even -- save for the names and the Detective Conan logo".

==== Spin-offs ====
Gosho Aoyama's assistants have written an anthology series of Case Closed which are released irregularly.

A spin-off manga series, titled Case Closed: The Culprit Hanzawa, by Mayuko Kanba, began in the July 2017 issue of Shogakukan's Shōnen Sunday S, released on May 25, 2017.

Another spin-off manga series, illustrated by Takahiro Arai with supervision by Aoyama, titled Case Closed: Zero's Tea Time started in issue #24 of Weekly Shōnen Sunday on May 9, 2018. The story centers on the agent Toru Amuro/Rei Furuya. New chapters of the manga are only published when Case Closed is on hiatus.

Another spin-off manga series by Arai, titled Detective Conan: Police Academy Arc – Wild Police Story, was serialized in Weekly Shōnen Sunday from October 2, 2019, to November 18, 2020. Spanning 13 chapters, it again focuses on Amuro/Furuya during his years in the police academy with his colleagues.

=== Anime ===
An anime television series adaptation, produced by Yomiuri Telecasting Corporation and TMS Entertainment, premiered on January 8, 1996. Over 1,200 episodes have aired in Japan, making it one of the longest anime series.

A total of 29 films have released each year since 1997 (excluding 2020), with the latest film Detective Conan: Fallen Angel of the Highway premiered in Japan on April 10, 2026. Each film features an original story, rather than being adapted from the manga.

=== Video games ===
Case Closed's expansion into the video games industry followed behind its foray into animation. On December 27, 1996, Detective Conan: Chika Yuuenchi Satsujin Jiken was released for the Game Boy. Since then, 24 games have been released. Currently, the majority of the games have only been released in Japan, though Nobilis has localized Case Closed: The Mirapolis Investigation for the PAL region. All dedicated Detective Conan games released for the Game Boy, Sony's consoles, the WonderSwan, and the Nintendo DS have been developed by Bandai. Banpresto developed the Case Closed titles on the Game Boy Color and Game Boy Advance while Marvelous Entertainment developed Case Closed: The Mirapolis Investigation.

=== Audio CDs ===
Katsuo Ono composed and arranged the music in the Case Closed animation; his works have been released on several CDs. Two image albums, comprising several songs sung by Japanese voice actors of the characters in the animation, were also released. Several theme music were performed by pop musicians such as B'z, Zard, and Garnet Crow. The first four theme music were released by Universal Music Group and all releases thereafter were by Being Inc.

The Best of Detective Conan and The Best of Detective Conan 2 albums collectively sold over 2.2 million copies, while singles from The Best of Detective Conan 3 collectively sold over 1.6 million copies. On July 25, 2017, the singer Mai Kuraki was awarded a Guinness World Record for singing the most theme songs in a single anime series, having sung 21 songs for the Case Closed series, starting "Secret of My Heart" (2000). On September 27, 2026, Kuraki broke her own Guinness World Record for "Most Theme Songs Sung by the Same Artist for an Animation Series", having sung 30 theme songs for Case Closed.

=== Live-action drama ===
Four live action drama TV specials and a TV series were created by Yomiuri Telecasting Corporation and TMS entertainment based on the series. The first two specials aired in 2006 and 2007 featuring Shun Oguri portraying the teenage Jimmy Kudo and Tomoka Kurokawa as Rachel Moore. The third and fourth TV specials aired in 2011 and 2012 featuring Junpei Mizobata as Jimmy and Shioli Kutsuna as Rachel. The cast used for those TV specials were used for the television series which aired between July 7 and September 29, 2011.

=== Other related media ===
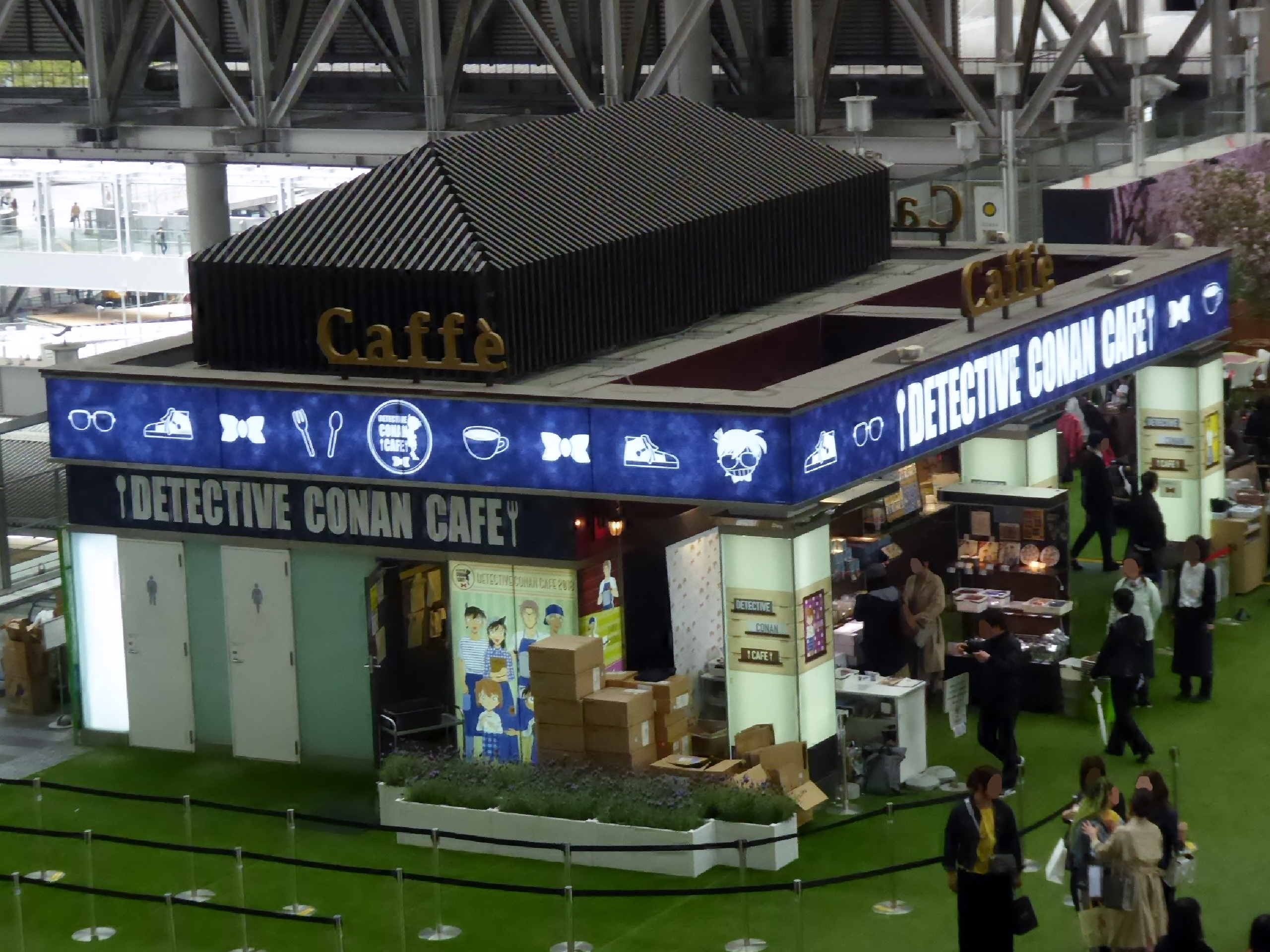
A Case Closed-themed cafe

In celebration of the 50th anniversary of Weekly Shōnen Sunday and Weekly Shōnen Magazine, the two companies collaborated to publish twelve biweekly magazines consisting of chapters from Weekly Shōnen Sunday's Case Closed and Weekly Shōnen Magazine's Kindaichi Case Files. The magazine ran between April 10, 2008, and September 25, 2008.

Shogakukan have also produced many books spun off from the series. Fifty volumes of a film comic series were published in Japan between June 1996 and August 2000, covering the first 143 episodes of the anime, though some episodes were skipped. Five additional film comics entitled 5 Juuyou Shorui (5重要書類, lit. 5 Important Documents) were published between July 2001 and January 2002 and covered selected episodes between 162 and 219. Thirteen official guide books were published between June 1997 and April 2009. Shogakukan has also published novels, digest books, educational books, and puzzle books.

In North America, Score Entertainment published the Case Closed Trading Card Game on June 29, 2005. The game entails the use of three customized decks of cards, which players buy and collect. Representing characters, events, and objects in Case Closed, these cards are used by players to fulfill certain conditions to solve a case and win the game. Certain cards are used to foil the progress of the player's opponents. An English unofficial guidebook to the series titled The Case Closed Casebook: An Essential Guide was published by DH Publishing Inc. on March 25, 2008. A collaborative themed event by Universal Studios Japan with the series, for the Universal Cool Japan 2018 attractions, ran from January 19 to June 24, 2018. A permanent attraction for the park, titled Detective Conan 4-D Live Show: Jewel Under the Starry Sky, opened on March 22, 2024. Characters from the series were featured in a crossover event for the survival horror video game Identity V for the game's China server in 2020, and released globally in 2021.

== Reception ==
=== Popularity ===
The series has ranked on the "Book of the Year" list from Media Factory's Da Vinci magazine, where professional book reviewers, bookstore employees, and Da Vinci readers participate; it ranked fifth in 2012; eleventh in 2014; fourth in 2015; sixth in 2016; fifth in 2017; first in 2018; fifth in 2019; sixth in 2020; tenth in 2021; fifth in 2022; eighth in 2023; 13th in 2024; and 22nd in 2025. On TV Asahi's Manga Sōsenkyo 2021 poll, in which 150,000 people voted for their top 100 manga series, Case Closed ranked fourth, behind One Piece, Demon Slayer: Kimetsu no Yaiba and Slam Dunk.

In 2006, the Japanese government used Conan in campaigns to help promote crime awareness among children. Targeting the same audience, Japan's Ministry of Foreign Affairs used Conan and his friends in two pamphlets: one to promote the ministry's mission, the other to introduce the 34th G8 summit held in the country in 2010. Several characters in the series featured in the sixth installment of the Anime, Heroes and Heroines commemorative stamp series issued by Japan Post in 2006. Aoyama and his creations are celebrated in his hometown Hokuei, Tottori; a museum with exhibits of his work is located there, and several bronze statues of Jimmy Kudo, Conan Edogawa, and Rachel Moore are installed in various locations throughout the town. It also has other tourist attractions related to Detective Conan, including a Detective Conan themed airport and train station, and it is promoted as Conan Town.

In 2018, Case Closed caught the attention of American late night talk show host Conan O'Brien, who discussed the character Conan Edogawa as well as Conan Town in his talk show Conan, and visited the town in September 2018.

==== Sales ====
By October 2021, the Case Closed manga had over 250 million copies in circulation worldwide, making it one of the best-selling manga series, having been sold in 25 countries. By January 2023, the manga had over 270 million copies in circulation worldwide. In Japan, individual volumes frequently appear on the lists of best-selling manga. Case Closed was the nineteenth best selling manga in 2011, with 2,120,091 copies sold. Nikkei Entertainment magazine published a list of top 50 manga creators by sales since January 2010, in its September 2011 issue; Gosho Aoyama, the author of Case Closed was ranked sixteenth, with 3,320,000 copies sold. It was the seventeenth best selling manga in 2012, with 2,430,572 copies sold. In 2013, Case Closed became the 24th best selling manga, with 1,966,206 copies sold. In 2024, alongside Space Brothers, Case Closed won the grand prize of Rakuten Kobo's second E-book Award in the "Long Seller Comic" category.

Licensed merchandise based on Detective Conan are sold in Asia. In Japan, Detective Conan licensed merchandise sold ¥2.89 billion in 2003, ¥17.29 billion during 2005–2008, and ¥9.03 billion during 2010–2012, adding up to at least ¥29.21 billion ($366.08 million) sold in Japan between 2003 and 2012. The first volume of Case Closed appeared thrice in the top ten selling lists, right after its premiere, the same volume has also appeared in the Diamond Comic Distributors's ranking list. Later-published volumes have appeared on The New York Times Manga Best Sellers lists. Case Closed is one of the best-selling manga in Vietnam, with volumes 93–96, surpassing the 1.5 million digital copies each by 2020.

=== Critical response ===
In the United States, Case Closed received praises from Mania.com's Eduardo M. Chavez and IGN's A. E. Sparrow for its stories—telling the mysteries and how they were unfolded by the investigations of Conan and gang. Sparrow called the style of the series a mix of Scooby-Doo and Sherlock Holmes, while Chavez believed the manga had appeal to readers of all ages. Melissa Sternenberg from THEM Anime Reviews gave the series 5 out of 5 stars, she praised its animation and plot, and described it as "what puts Detective Conan as my all-time favorite anime is the superb writing. I soak up Detective Conan like a good book, I get so drawn into every episode that everything around me just sinks away and it is just me and the episode. It is engrossing. I can not think of another word for it. Like I said, every episode is fresh, and every mystery that is solved is profound. The kid is a prodigy, and you can not blink while watching an episode of this wonderful series".

ActiveAnime's reviewers commented on complex character design and the "spirit" that the series has, indicating that fans of serialized mystery shows would rather enjoy it. The series is also said to better suit the more matured audience. Lori Lancaster of Mania.com described Case Closed as "a clever series that had mysteries at every corner", noting the "bizarre" and "interesting" nature of each case. IGN's Chris Wyatt was positive to the manner the cases were set up, relating them to Agatha Christie's locked-room mysteries. He described the series as "Inspector Gadget meets Law & Order but in an anime style".

=== Accolades ===
The Case Closed manga series was awarded the 46th Shogakukan Manga Award in the shōnen category in 2001. It respondents in an online poll for Japanese citizens in their mid-twenties voted Case Closed as one of the top three manga they wanted to continue running in publication. In France, the series was nominated for the Angoulême Festival Graphic Novel award among the Japanese selection. The series ranked on About.com's top continuing manga series of 2010, under the title "Best Underappreciated Gem: Shonen" category.

== Bibliography ==
- Takuya Furukawa; Tim Gene (March 2008). DH Publishing Inc (ed.). The Case Closed Casebook: An Essential Guide. DH Publishing. p. 191. ISBN 978-1932897302.
- Conan Drill: The Decipherment of The Conan (in Japanese). Shogakukan. May 1, 2003. p. 336. ISBN 4-09-179402-5.
- Jonathan Clements; Helen McCarthy (2006). Stone Bridge Press (ed.). The Anime Encyclopedia. Stone Bridge Press. p. 867. ISBN 1845765001.
- Jason Thompson (2012). Random House (ed.). Manga: The Complete Guide. Random House Worlds. p. 592. ISBN 9780345539441.
