= Jimmy Kudo =

Main character of the manga and anime series Case Closed

Shinichi Kudo
- Case Closed character
- Shinichi Kudo, shown in his regular form (top) and his "Conan Edogawa" form (bottom) from the manga, as drawn by Gosho Aoyama
- First appearance: Case Closed File 1: "A Modern-Day Sherlock Holmes"
- Created by: Gosho Aoyama
- Voiced by (Japanese): Kappei Yamaguchi (Shin'ichi); Minami Takayama (Conan)
- Voiced by (English): Jimmy Kudo: Jerry Jewell (Funimation) (Note: Also voices Conan Edogawa's inner thoughts in Jimmy Kudo's voice.); Joseph Murray (Odex); Griffin Burns (Bang Zoom/Macias Group); Mauricio Ortiz-Segura (Studio Nano); TBC (Magic Kaito 1412); Conan Edogawa: Alison Viktorin (Funimation); Joseph Murray (Odex); Wendee Lee (Bang Zoom/Macias Group); Molly Zhang (Studio Nano); TBC (Magic Kaito 1412)
- Portrayed by: Shun Oguri, Junpei Mizobata (Shinichi); Nao Fujisaki (Conan)

In-universe information
- Nickname: Great Detective of the East
- Relatives: Yukiko Kudo (mother); Yusaku Kudo (father); Toichi Kuroba (uncle); Ran Mori (girlfriend); Chikage Kuroba (aunt); Kaito Kuroba (cousin)
- Real name: Shin'ichi Kudo (Jimmy Kudo in English version)
- Nationality: Japanese

Shinichi Kudo (Japanese: 工藤 新一, Hepburn: Kudō Shin'ichi), known in some major English adaptations as Jimmy Kudo, (Note: He is known as Jimmy Kudo in the English version of the manga as published by Viz Media and in the English anime adaptation as dubbed by Funimation for the U.S., Canada, UK, and Ireland regions. He is known by his Japanese name in the English version of the manga published by Shogakukan Asia in Southeast Asia and the 3-in-1 edition published in the U.S. by Viz Media, in Bang Zoom! Entertainment's English dub for the feature films, in Tubi's English dub for the main TV series produced by Macias Group, and in Studio Nano's English dub of curated episodes produced for Crunchyroll and Netflix.) is a fictional character and the main protagonist of the manga series Case Closed, created by Gosho Aoyama. A high school detective, he is forced to ingest a poison after an encounter with members of a criminal organization. Due to a rare side effect, the poison did not kill him, but instead shrunk his body into that of a child, forcing him to adopt the pseudonym Conan Edogawa (江戸川 コナン, Edogawa Konan). He lives with his childhood friend Ran Mouri and her father as he awaits the day he can take down the organization that poisoned him and reclaim his original identity.

== Creation and conception ==
The idea that Shinichi Kudo would be turned into a child stemmed from the idea of a Tortoiseshell cat Sherlock Holmes as a protagonist. Gosho Aoyama's idea was the cat would indicate the crucial evidence needed to solve the case; a performance the child-turned Shinichi does to help those around with the investigation. Shinichi was inspired by the fictional private eye Shunsaku Kudo, the protagonist of the Japanese television series Tantei Monogatari. Aoyama revealed that his editor was against the name Conan due to the protagonist from the anime series Future Boy Conan sharing the same name and had suggested naming him Doyle instead. The author stuck with the name Conan believing it would overtake the Future Boy series. According to Aoyama, Shinichi's catch phrase, "There is always only one truth!" (真実はいつもひとつ!, Shinjitsu wa Itsumo Hitotsu!), was thought of by the anime adaptation's script writer and written into chapter 95 of the manga at the same time. In the English localizations, the catch phrase is translated as "One Truth Prevails".

Aoyama said that it took him only a single minute to come up with Conan's design. The character's basic hairstyle is similar to that of the protagonist of his previous series Yaiba, only "silkier", while the cowlick was inspired by Kabu from Sally the Witch. The author also remarked that he took hair "pointers" from Shichimi, the hero of Niji-iro Tōgarashi. Conan's basic outfit is something that boys wear for Shichi-Go-San festivals; Aoyama himself wore such clothes as a child. A fan of Superman, Conan's glasses were borrowed from Clark Kent's use of them to disguise his identity, and were discussed in series with Anita in volume 24. Jimmy's "cool" and slightly rude manner of speech is based on Joe Yabuki from Ashita no Joe, with a "hint" of Touch added in.

== Appearances ==
=== In Case Closed ===
At the beginning of the series, Shinichi is a gifted 16-year-old student at Teitan High School in Tokyo. He was already well known as a brilliant young detective who had closed many difficult cases that professionals could not. He is also secretly in love with his childhood best friend Ran Mouri (Rachel Moore), but refuses to admit his feelings due to both stubbornness and shyness. Later, while on a date with Ran at a theme park, Shinichi leaves Ran and follows two suspicious characters, Gin and Vodka, suspecting they are criminals. Gin ends up attacking Shinichi and forces him to drink an experimental poison known as "APTX-4869" (APTX(アポトキシン)-4869(四八六九), Apotokishin Yon Hachi Roku Kyū) which is supposed to kill him without leaving traces for the police to find autopsy, and then leaves him for dead. However, instead of killing Shinichi, a rare side-effect occurs, causing his body to regress into the form of a young child with his intellect and memories intact. With advice from Dr. Hiroshi Agasa, Shinichi adopts the identity of Conan Edogawa, devised from the names of Arthur Conan Doyle and Edogawa Rampo, to prevent Gin, Vodka, and their syndicate, the Black Organization, from returning to kill him and those around him. For this reason, he chooses not to reveal his true identity to anyone else, to keep them safe.

Shinichi pretends to be a distant relative of Dr. Agasa's and is placed in the care of Ran and her father, Kogoro Mouri (Richard Moore), who owns a detective agency. Shinichi and Dr. Agasa feel that clues regarding the Black Organization may possibly filter through the agency, allowing Shinichi to learn more about them and ultimately bring them down. Because of Shinichi's disappearance, Conan has to constantly find creative ways to fool Ran into believing he is off solving a very difficult case and will return once the investigation is concluded. This becomes increasingly difficult as she begins to suspect his true identity.

As a child, Conan must attend Teitan Elementary, where he inadvertently forms a detective club called the Detective Boys (Junior Detective League) with friends he makes at the school. Conan is forced to adapt to his new daily life and becomes accustomed to attending elementary school while secretly helping Richard solve crimes with the use of his gadgets invented by Dr. Agasa. The most prominent of these are: his voice-changing bowtie, allowing him to impersonate anyone's voice; his customized glasses, which allow him to track and listen through his covert listening devices; his super sneakers, which multiply his kicking force; his wrist watch stun gun, which allows him to tranquilize Richard or a criminal; his Solar Powered skateboard and soccer ball dispenser belt; and super strong/elastic suspenders, among others.

Conan eventually meets Heiji Hattori (Harley Hartwell), a detective from Osaka who is seeking to challenge Shinichi in a deductive battle. After drinking baijiu while sick with a cold, Conan reverts to a teenager and rectifies a deduction made by Heiji. In their second encounter, Heiji is able to deduce Conan's identity as Shinichi Kudo and confronts him about it. The two later become good friends.

As the series progresses, Conan befriends biochemist Shiho Miyano, a former member of the Black Organization and inventor of the APTX-4869 drug. She and her sister had grown up within the organization, as their scientist parents had been members before their deaths. After her sister was killed by Gin, she took the poison to commit suicide. However, like Shinichi, her age regressed and she shrank back to a small child's size. She then escapes and adopts the pseudonym Ai Haibara (Anita Hailey). Dr. Agasa ends up taking her in, and she vows to help Conan take down the Black Organization. She later invents a prototype antidote to the APTX-4869 allowing Conan to temporarily become Shinichi again, which Conan uses on occasion to fool Ran when she suspects his true identity. During the events of Holmes' Revelation, Shinichi, while in his original form, confesses his feelings to Ran in London. In The Scarlet School Trip, Ran returns these feelings by giving Shinichi a kiss on the cheek.

Conan's investigation of the Black Organization leads him to discover the American FBI's existence in Japan, as they are also investigating the syndicate. The head of the syndicate, often referred to as 'that person' and 'boss' by syndicate members, who is at least one-hundred and thirty, is Renya Karasuma. However, the FBI and Conan are currently unaware of this. His collaboration with FBI agents Jodie Starling and Shuichi Akai allows them to capture organization member Kir. They discover she is really an undercover CIA agent and return her to the organization to continue to spy from within.

=== In other media ===
Shinichi Kudo has appeared in all of the feature films of the series, both the original video animation series (Shōnen Sunday Original animations and the Magic Files), the two-hour cross-over television special Lupin the 3rd vs Detective Conan, and is the protagonist in all Case Closed-related video games. He is the protagonist in the novels of the series. In the 2006–2007 live-action series, he is portrayed by Shun Oguri as a teenager and Nao Fujisaki in child form. In the 2011 live-action movie and TV drama series, Junpei Mizobata portrays the teenage Shinichi.

In 2006, the Japanese government used Conan in campaigns to help promote crime awareness among children. Targeting the same audience, Japan's Ministry of Foreign Affairs used Conan and his friends in two pamphlets: one to promote the ministry's mission, and the other to introduce the 34th G8 summit held in the country in 2008. Conan and his friends were also featured in the sixth installment of the Anime, Heroes and Heroines commemorative stamp series issued by Japan Post in 2006.

Conan, along with Ran and Kogoro, appears in episode 18 of Star Detective Precure!, as part of a collaboration event between the two series.

== Reception ==
In the survey "friendship" developed by rankingjapan.com in which people had to choose what anime character they would like to have as a friend, Shinichi ranked third. In Newtype magazine Shinichi ranked fourth and ninth in the 2001 and 2010 polls for most popular male anime character, respectively. In the Animage's Anime Grand Prix awards from 1998, Shinichi was voted as the tenth most popular male anime character. Mania Entertainment rated Conan as the third greatest anime detective. Shinichi Kudo and Conan Edogawa were the second and third most popular characters in the series defined by a poll on ebooksjapan.jp. Jian DeLeon of Complex magazine named him eighteenth on a list of "The 25 Most Stylish Anime Characters." Additionally, in 2017 Charapedia poll, Kudo ranked as the 5th most ideal Prime Minister in anime series. Conan won the "clever" award in the Animedia's magazine "Animedia Character Awards 2019" for standout anime characters chosen by the readers. In Japanese, Danganronpa 2: Goodbye Despair protagonist Hajime Hinata was voiced by Takayama. Due to Kudo's popularity, the game staff developed a snowboarding minigame, as Kudo often surfs a turbo skateboard. In a Japanese poll from AnimeAnime, Kudo was voted as the best character voiced by Takayama.
