= Tomoka Kurokawa =

Japanese actress

- Born: Tomoko Kurokawa; August 1, 1989 (age 36); Tokyo, Japan
- Years active: 2002 - present
- Spouse: Unknown (m. 2015)

Tomoka Kurokawa (黒川智花; born August 1, 1989 in Tokyo) is a Japanese actress. She graduated from Horikoshi High School on February 18, 2008. She began attending Asia University in April 2008.

== Filmography ==
=== Drama ===
- Don't Forget Me | Dai Renai: Boku o Wasureru Kimi to (TBS / 2018) - Yuzuka Sawada
- Aino Mating Agency Inc | Aino Kekkon Soudanjo (TV Asahi / 2017) - Kana Sawamine (ep.6)
- I Love You Just a Little Bit | Anata no Koto wa Sorehodo (TBS/ 2017) - Rumi Mori
- The Last Cop (NTV / 2016) - Saori Kashiwagi
- Comes Morning | Asa ga Kuru (Fuji TV-Tokai TV / 2016) - Konomi Hirata
- Money Angel | Mane no Tenshi (YTV-NTV / 2016) - Mika Shirai (ep.3)
- Aibou: Season 14 (TV Asahi / 2015–2016) - Sayumi Yajima (ep.12)
- The Concierge | Hoteru Konsheruju (TBS / 2015)- Shiori Miyama (ep.5)
- DOCTORS 3: The Ultimate Surgeon | DOCTORS 3 Saikyou no Meii TV Asahi / 2015) - Ami Aihara
- Cinderella Date (Tokai TV-Fuji TV / 2014) - Erika Tanaka
- Kurofuku Monogatari (TV Asahi / 2014) - Ayano
- Last Doctor | Rasuto Dokuta - Kansatsui Akita no Kenshi Hokoku (TV Tokyo / 2014) - Koiso (ep.7)
- Woman of Maruho | Maruho no Onna - Hoken Hanzai Chosain (TV Tokyo / 2014) - Aoi Akamine (ep.3)
- DOCTORS 2: The Ultimate Surgeon | DOCTORS 2 Saikyou no Meiklejohn (TV Asahi / 2013) - Ami Aihara
- Confirmation-Grand Theft Squad 3 | Kakusho～Keishicho Sousa 3 Ka (TBS / 2013) - Minayo Tomosaka
- Sousa Chizu no Onna (TV Asahi / 2012) - Reiko Saotome / Koharu (ep.3)
- Dr. Ume-chan | Umechan Sensei (NHK / 2012) - Yukiko Suto
- Answer ~ Keishicho Kensho Sosakan TV Asahi / 2012) - Mayuko Mishima (ep.4)
- Today is the Best Day | Honjitsu wa Taian Nari (NHK / 2012) - Rumi Asahina
- DOCTORS: The Ultimate Surgeon | DOCTORS Saikyou no Meii (TV Asahi / 2011) - Ami Aihara
- CSI: Crime Scene Talks Season 1 | Iryu Sosa TV Asahi / 2011) - ep.2
- Jin 2 (TBS / 2011) - Princess Chikako Kazunomiya
- Kaoruko - Empress of the Night | Jotei Kaoruko (TV Asahi 2010) - Miki Minamino
- Bloody Monday 2 (2010) as Hibiki
- Mirai Koshi Meguru (2008)
- Asakusa Fukumaru Ryokan 2 (2007)
- Kikujiro to Saki 3 (2007)
- Kanojo to no Tadashii Asobikata (2007)
- My Sweet Home (2007)
- Kimi ga Hikari wo Kureta (2006)
- Teru Teru Ashita (2006)
- Gachi Baka (2006) as Kana Morimoto
- Satomi Hakkenden (2006)
- Ima Ai ni Yukimasu (2005)
- Ame to Yume no Ato ni (2005)
- 3 nen B gumi Kinpachi sensei 7 (2004)
- Denchi ga Kireru Made (2004)
- Tōbōsha (2004)
- Kokoro (2003)
- Ai Nante Irane Yo, Natsu (2002)

=== Films ===
- The Last Cop: The Movie (2017) - Saori Kashiwagi
- Love Gear | Koisuru Haguruma (2013) - Risa Fujishima
- Way - Man of the White Porcelain | Michi - Hakuji no Hito (2012) - Mitsue Asada
- hojotachi no Rashinban (2011) - Natsume Hirose
- Pride | Puraido (2009) - Sayaka Higashino
- Hatsu Kare (2006)
- 8.1 (2005)
- Naruto the Movie 2 (2005, voice)
- Last Quarter (2004)
- Onpaku (2024)

== TV Dramas ==
Year	Title	Role	Notes
2006	Detective Conan: Shinichi Kudo's Written Challenge	Ran Mouri	Live-action special
2007	Shinichi Kudo Returns! Showdown with the Black Organization	Ran Mouri	Live-action special
