= List of Case Closed characters =

Many of the main characters as they appear in the anime. Top row from left to right: Vodka, Vermouth, Korn, Gin, Kaito Kid, Herschel Agasa, Harley Hartwell, Richard Moore, Joseph Meguire, Masumi Sera, Wataru Takagi, Miwako Sato, Booker Kudo, Vivian Kudo, Toru Amuro, Jodie Starling, James Black, Shuichi Akai, and Subaru Okiya. Bottom row from left to right: Chianti, Kazuya Toyama, George Kojima, Conan Edogawa, Amy Yoshida, Rachel Moore, Serena Sebastian, Mitch Tsuburaya, Jimmy Kudo, Anita Hailey, and André Camel.

A relationship diagram for the main characters as they appear in the second episode of the live-action drama series.

The manga series Case Closed, also known as Detective Conan, features a large cast of fictional characters created by Gosho Aoyama. Set in modern-day Japan, it follows amateur high school detective Jimmy Kudo as he solves cases in an episodic fashion while in his childhood body and under the alias Conan Edogawa. He is joined by childhood friend Rachel Moore and her father Richard, who runs a detective agency. Throughout the series, Conan interacts with and befriends many characters from various groups: the Tokyo Metropolitan Police, the local police in Conan's prefecture; the Junior Detective League, a group of children who solve mysteries for their clients; and the FBI. He also befriends a few individuals who know of his true identity: Dr. Agasa, who provides Jimmy with various spy gadgets; Harley Hartwell, a fellow high school detective from Osaka; and Anita Hailey, the original developer of the poison that turned him, and her, into children.

The manga is licensed by Viz Media while the anime adaptation was first licensed and dubbed by Funimation, then later dubbed by the Macias Group and released on Tubi, followed by a dub of select episodes by Studio Nano and released on Crunchyroll and Netflix. Funimation and Viz have Americanized many character names, with both companies using different names or spellings for the same characters on several occasions. Other English releases such as the manga published in Singapore by Shogakukan Asia, the anime streaming on Tubi, the curated dub on Crunchyroll and Netflix, and the home videos dubbed by Bang Zoom! Entertainment and released through Discotek Media romanize the Japanese names.

The list follows the names as presented by the Viz Media manga.

== Main characters ==
=== Jimmy Kudo ===
Jimmy Kudo, also officially known as Shinichi Kudo (工藤 新一, Kudō Shin'ichi), is a high school detective who solves difficult cases for the police. During one of his investigations, he is attacked and forced to take an experimental poison by a member of the Black Organization. However, due to a rare side-effect, he shrinks to the form of a young child.^{[ch. 1]} In order to keep his true identity a secret, he now goes under the alias Conan Edogawa (江戸川 コナン, Edogawa Konan) and pretends to be a real child to throw off suspicion while he secretly solves many cases and looks for clues about the organization.^{[ch. 2]} He is in love with his childhood friend Ran Mori, but cannot confess his feelings or reveal his true identity in order to protect her.

=== Rachel Moore ===
Voiced by: Wakana Yamazaki (1996–2026), Akemi Okamura (2026–present) (Note: Okamura was announced to took over for Yamazaki in 2026 while she was receiving medical treatment, starting with episode 1136, which aired on March 14; following Yamazaki's death in April of the same year, Okamura took over the role of the character.) (Japanese); Colleen Clinkenbeard (Funimation), Cristina Vee (Bang Zoom/Macias Group), Megan Shipman (Studio Nano) (English)
Portrayed by: Tomoka Kurokawa, Shiori Kutsuna

Rachel Moore, also officially known as Ran Mori (毛利 蘭, Mōri Ran), has been Jimmy Kudo's friend since elementary school. She adores Jimmy but is afraid to admit it, and whenever the subject of their relationship is brought up, she denies it is romantic. Rachel frequently worries about his safety and anticipates his return. As captain of the karate team and a regional champion, she is an accomplished fighter but remains fearful of horror films.^{[ch. 1]} Rachel's parents are also skilled martial artists. She is very kind and willing to assist anyone in need, even if the individual is a potential criminal. In one instance, her compassion motivates Vermouth to keep Jimmy's identity hidden from the Black Organization. As with Jimmy, she opposes the idea of killing anyone, including criminals, believing that criminals should face trial. She is regarded as a role model by the Junior Detective League, and the children frequently seek her advice. She is adept at household chores such as sewing, knitting, and cooking, and has a knack for chance games, rarely losing in games such as mahjong. She spends the majority of her time at home caring for Conan and her father. Her parents live apart, and she is hoping that they will reconcile. She has suspected Conan Edogawa of being Jimmy throughout the series. Nonetheless, Jimmy dupes her into second-guessing herself.^{[ch. 3, 258]}

Although he hesitated to call her perfect, Aoyama said he conceived of Rachel to be a girl that Jimmy could dream about; a responsible student, top athlete, good cook, kindhearted, and very loyal. Having never created a girl like her before, the author said he wanted to draw a girl who was strong in every way. With kendo, karate and judo being the only martial arts he knew how to draw, and having already used the first one in his previous series Yaiba, Aoyama decided on karate for Rachel because it was "cooler".^{[vol. 83:cast profiles]} Her Japanese name, Ran Mori, originates from Maurice Leblanc (Mo-ri-su Ru-bu-ran), the creator of Arsene Lupin.^{[vol. 4:Mystery Library]}

=== Richard Moore ===
Voiced by: Akira Kamiya (1996–2009), Rikiya Koyama (2009–present) (Japanese); R. Bruce Elliott (Funimation), Xander Mobus (Bang Zoom/Macias Group), Robert McCollum (Studio Nano) (English)
Portrayed by: Takanori Jinnai

Richard Moore, also officially known as Kogoro Mori (毛利 小五郎, Mōri Kogorō), is Rachel's father and a private detective. Richard gains fame due to Conan frequently sedating him and impersonating his voice to solve cases. He and Conan share a certain amount of rivalry. At times, Richard is egocentric, claiming credit for cracking cases that Conan had already solved during their time together. Because he appears to be tired or sleeping when solving a case, he is often referred to as "Sleeping Moore" (眠りの小五郎, Nemuri no Kogorō; lit. 'Sleeping Kogoro').^{[ch. 119]} Before becoming a private detective, he worked as a police officer under Inspector Meguire.^{[ch. 7]} He is married to Eva Kaden, a successful lawyer and childhood friend, but they have been separated for over ten years due to their constant arguing.^{[ch. 107]} He reveals that on many occasions, he still loves her and has attempted to reconcile their relationship.^{[ch. 266]} Despite his irresponsible habits of drinking, gambling, and flirting with young women, he cares deeply for his daughter and at times displays his sense of honor and strict ethics. He is skilled in judo.^{[ch. 86]}

Not expecting Case Closed to last long, Aoyama said he did not spend much time on Moore's design and basically drew a thinner version of Captain Nakamori from his earlier manga Magic Kaito. After being told they looked too similar, he gave Moore a pompadour and changed the mustache. When they later appeared together, he made Moore the taller character. Aoyama made him a former police officer working as a private detective because it would be easy to set up stories.^{[vol. 83:cast profiles]} His Japanese name, Kogoro Mori, originates from Kogoro Akechi, a detective in Edogawa Rampo stories.^{[vol. 2:Mystery Library]}

== Junior Detective League ==
The Junior Detective League, also officially known as the Detective Boys (少年探偵団, Shōnen Tantei-dan), are a group of first-graders consisting of Conan Edogawa, Amy Yoshida (Japanese name: Ayumi Yoshida) Mitch Tsuburaya (Mitsuhiko Tsuburaya), George Kojima (Genta Kojima) and Anita Hailey (Ai Haibara). Dr. Agasa often chaperones the kids and assists them when a case needs to be solved. As a symbol of the group, each member has a badge used as a walkie-talkie and a tracer.^{[ch. 56]} Aoyama said that he created the original trio as a way to conceal Anita, and that "The big tough guy, the thin brawny guy, and the cute little girl" were basically the children in Doraemon but with completely different personalities.^{[vol. 83:cast profiles]}

=== Amy Yoshida ===
Voiced by: Yukiko Iwai (Japanese); Monica Rial (Funimation), Janice Kawaye (Bang Zoom), Krystal Valdes (Macias Group), Abigail Blythe (Studio Nano) (English)

Amy Yoshida, also officially known as Ayumi Yoshida (吉田 歩美, Yoshida Ayumi) and dubbed by Funimation as Amy Yeager, is Conan Edogawa's friend and classmate.^{[ch. 17]} Amy was the sole female member of the Junior Detective League until they got Anita Hailey to join. She has a crush on Conan, which makes him uncomfortable,^{[ch. 39]} and was jealous that Anita attracts Conan's attention,^{[ch. 201]} and that Conan seems to be attracted to Rachel.^{Film: Countdown} She is a naive and innocent little girl who shows courage from time to time and acts as the team's cheerful spirit. Amy and Anita later become good friends, referring to each other on a first name basis and using "-chan" in the Japanese version.^{[ch. 400]} Aoyama modeled the high-end condominium that Amy's family lives in after a place he used to live.^{[vol. 83:cast profiles]}

=== Mitch Tsuburaya ===
Voiced by: Ikue Ōtani, Ai Orikasa (episodes 425–436 and The Private Eyes' Requiem) (Note: Orikasa substituted for Ōtani while she was on maternity leave from voice acting in 2006.) (Japanese); Cynthia Cranz (Funimation), Erika Harlacher (Bang Zoom), Ghia Burns (Macias Group), Brittney Karbowski (Studio Nano) (English)

Mitch Tsuburaya, also officially known as Mitsuhiko Tsuburaya (円谷 光彦, Tsuburaya Mitsuhiko) and dubbed Mitch Tennison by Funimation, is a friend of Amy Yoshida and George Kojima who enjoys reading science books and takes a scientific approach to problem-solving.^{[ch. 17]} He is infatuated with Amy,^{[ch. 39]} and later Anita Hailey. He is a smart and well-read first-grader who believes that technology can solve most problems. It was shown that his parents are both teachers. He has an older sister named Asami Tsuburaya, who is two years his senior.

=== George Kojima ===
Voiced by: Wataru Takagi (Japanese); Dameon Clarke (seasons 1–4; Funimation), Mike McFarland (season 5; Funimation), Andrew Russell (Bang Zoom), Jorge Barranco (Macias Group), Bryson Baugus (Studio Nano) (English)

George Kojima, also officially known as Genta Kojima (小嶋 元太, Kojima Genta) and dubbed George Kaminski in the Funimation anime and sometimes the Viz manga,^{[ch. 63]} is the overweight, self-proclaimed leader of the Junior Detective League. He loves food and can eat more than all the other Junior Detective League members combined. Even though he can be intimidating, he is very kind. He is a friend of Amy Yoshida and Mitch Tsuburaya and has admired his father, who owns a liquor store.^{[ch. 303]} Both he and Mitch have a crush on Amy,^{[ch. 81]} and they both envy Conan since she likes him.

=== Anita Hailey ===
Voiced by: Megumi Hayashibara (Japanese); Brina Palencia (Funimation), Erica Mendez (Bang Zoom), Xanthe Huynh (Bang Zoom (Note: Black Iron Submarine)/Macias Group), Alexis Tipton (Studio Nano) (English)
Portrayed by: Yuu Kashii (Shiho), Shibota Kyoka (Ai)

Shiho Miyano (宮野 志保, Miyano Shiho), dubbed Shelly Miyano by Funimation,^{Film: Countdown} is a former member of the Black Organization under the code name Sherry (シェリー, Sherī).^{[ch. 178]} A gifted chemist at a young age, she is the inventor of APTX 4869, the poison that shrank Jimmy Kudo. Her parents and sister, Akemi Miyano, also worked for the organization.^{[ch. 179]} Shiho betrays the organization after Gin kills her sister.^{[ch. 179]} She took the drug in a suicide attempt, but rather than dying, she, like Jimmy, became small. When she was 18, she escaped the organization and went into hiding.^{[ch. 458]} She is taken in by Dr. Agasa and is given the alias Anita Hailey, also officially known as Ai Haibara (灰原 哀, Haibara Ai) and dubbed Vi Graythorn by Funimation. Her alias is derived from the detective characters Cordelia Gray and V.I. Warshawski;^{[ch. 179]} "Hai" can mean "gray" in Japanese, and "Ai" is pronounced the same as the English letter "I". She shows affection towards Jimmy, but denies having such feelings.^{[ch. 191, 201]} Despite being constantly in the company of the Junior Detective League and Rachel Moore, she was very reserved and only opened up a little more to Rachel and Amy after some time; she later lets Amy call her "Anita-chan" instead of the more formal honorific "Anita-san".^{[ch. 400]} She often helps Conan solve cases and find information on the Black Organization to help bring them down in addition to working on the cure to their condition. She has strawberry blonde hair.^{[ch. 238]} She grew up in the United States,^{[ch. 303]} and is half-Japanese^{[ch. 398]} and half-English.^{[ch. 411]}

Aoyama conceived of Anita from the beginning of the series as a standoffish female character that would be Rachel's polar opposite. He originally planned to introduce her after the death of her sister, however, the anime adaptation changed the plot so that Akemi did not die. After waiting a while for the anime to end, he gave up and eventually introduced Anita in volume 18.^{[vol. 83:cast profiles]} In an interview, Aoyama stated her alias is a reference to Irene Adler from Sherlock Holmes novels.

== Major supporting characters ==
=== Dr. Herschel Agasa ===
Voiced by: Kenichi Ogata, Kazunari Tanaka (young) (Japanese); Bill Flynn (Funimation), Michael Sorich (Bang Zoom), Oscar Cheda (Macias Group), Christopher Guerrero (Studio Nano) (English)
Portrayed by: Ryosei Tayama

Dr. Herschel Agasa, also officially known as Hiroshi Agasa (阿笠 博士, Agasa Hiroshi),^{[vol. 40, 49:character guide]} appears as an absent-minded professor and neighbor to Jimmy Kudo. He is one of the few characters in the story who knows of Kudo's predicament and helps hide his identity as Conan Edogawa, inventing devices such as the voice-impersonating bowtie, tracking glasses, and badges, enhanced shoes and hoverboards, and an instant soccer ball so Conan can fend for himself. He often watches over the Junior Detective League and takes them on trips in his old VW Beetle.^{[ch. 111, 200]} After finding Shiho Miyano on the streets, he takes her into his care and gives her the alias Anita Hailey to hide her from the Black Organization.^{[ch. 179]}

=== Joseph Meguire ===
Voiced by: Chafurin (Japanese); Mark Stoddard (Funimation/Studio Nano), Jake Eberle (Bang Zoom), Oscar Cheda (Macias Group) (English)
Portrayed by: Masahiko Nishimura, Masatō Ibu

Inspector Joseph Meguire, also officially known as Inspector Juzo Megure (目暮 十三警部, Megure Jūzō-keibu), is a veteran police officer in charge of most of Tokyo Metropolitan Police Department's Division 1 of the Criminal Investigation Section. He has worked with Jimmy Kudo, Jimmy's father Booker, and was even the boss of Richard Moore before the latter becoming a private detective.^{[ch. 1]} He always wears a hat, which hides an old scar that he got from a particular case twenty years ago that involved a woman named Midori, who later became his wife.^{[ch. 286]} He is named and modeled after the fictional detective cop Jules Maigret and his Japanese counterpart, Megure.^{[vol. 5:afterword]}

=== Serena Sebastian ===
Voiced by: Naoko Matsui (Japanese); Laura Bailey (Funimation), Minx Lee (Bang Zoom), Crystal Lopez (Macias Group), Bree Han (Studio Nano) (English)
Portrayed by: Mayuko Iwasa, Sayaka Akimoto

Serena Sebastian, also officially known as Sonoko Suzuki (鈴木 園子, Suzuki Sonoko), is Rachel Moore's best friend.^{[ch. 40]} She has light brown hair and comes from a wealthy family with a high social status, although she does not flaunt this, preferring to be an outgoing social girl who chases after and flirts with attractive boys. She is a huge fan of the Kaito Kid. When Richard is unavailable, she is usually the person Conan knocks out and impersonates to solve cases instead, to which she sometimes thinks she too is a brilliant detective.^{[ch. 44]} In later chapters, she has a long-distance relationship with Makoto Kyogoku, a karate champion at Haido High School.^{[ch. 221]}

=== Harley Hartwell ===
Voiced by: Ryo Horikawa (Japanese); Kevin M. Connolly (Funimation), Lucien Dodge (Bang Zoom), Jason Kesser (Macias Group), Nazeeh Tarsha (Studio Nano) (English)
Portrayed by: Tori Matsuzaka

Harley Hartwell, also officially known as Heiji Hattori (服部 平次, Hattori Heiji), is a high school detective from Osaka and Jimmy Kudo's rival. His intelligence is at par with that of Jimmy, which often leads to intense rivalry between them.^{[ch. 92]} He later becomes friends with Conan Edogawa after discovering his true identity as Jimmy.^{[ch. 121]} Although he tries to hide it, he often gets concerned for Jimmy's safety when dealing with the Black Organization and warns him to be careful. He has a relationship with Kazuha Toyama, his childhood friend and love interest.^{[ch. 185]} Harley speaks in a Kansai dialect and is also a master kendo fighter.^{[ch. 92, 314]} His father Heizo Hartwell is the commissioner of the Osaka police department.^{[ch. 93, 150]}

When Anita could not be introduced as planned, the anime adaptation needed an interesting rival for Jimmy. So Aoyama created Harley to be another teenage detective whose personality clashes with Jimmy. Wanting the character to speak in a completely different manner, the author gave him a Kansai dialect; his editor at the time was from Osaka and supervised the dialect. Harley's dark skin tone provides yet another contrast from Jimmy.^{[vol. 83:cast profiles]}

=== Kazuha Toyama ===
Voiced by: Yūko Miyamura (Japanese); Gwendolyn Lau (Funimation), Kayli Mills (Bang Zoom), Andrea Villaverde (Macias Group), Raina Meginley (Studio Nano) (English)
Portrayed by: Rei Okamoto

Kazuha Toyama (遠山 和葉, Tōyama Kazuha), dubbed Kirsten Thomas by Funimation, is Harley Hartwell's childhood friend and a daughter of a commissioner who is positioned high in the Osaka police department. Harley and Kazuha's fathers are close friends. Her relationship with Harley closely mirrors Rachel Moore's with Jimmy Kudo; she is too shy to admit that they feel more than friendship for their respective partner. She and Harley share a pouch with a broken handcuff link; their good luck charm.^{[ch. 186]} She was, at first, jealous of Rachel because she mistakenly assumed that Rachel was in love with Harley and had a lot of coincidental similarities with him.^{[ch. 185–188, 211]} Upon finding out about Rachel's and Jimmy's relationship and Rachel's kind personality, she later becomes close friends with Rachel. She is also a skilled 2nd-degree blackbelt in Aikido.^{[ch. 188]}

== Black Organization ==
The primary antagonist of the series is the crime syndicate called the Black Organization (黒の組織, Kuro no Soshiki). The Organization has been known for its involvement in several felonies which range from blackmail to assassinations.^{[ch. 16, 500]} Conan's main objective is to bring them down, knowing that he can not return to his life as Jimmy unless doing so, for the sake of protecting his family and friends. Aoyama said that all of the members of the organization with code names based on alcoholic beverages are the same rank.^{[vol. 83:cast profiles]} The Black Organization leader's identity had been a mystery for most of the series as he only communicates with his subordinates by text messages until he is revealed as Renya Karasuma, who already had a brief cameo appearance in volume 30 of the manga.

=== Gin ===
Voiced by: Yukitoshi Hori (Japanese); Troy Baker (Funimation), D. C. Douglas (Bang Zoom), Nick Huber (Studio Nano) (English)
Portrayed by: Sasaki Kuranosuke

Gin (ジン, Jin) is a high-ranking agent in the organization,^{[vol. 49:character guide]} and a merciless killer who fed the APTX 4869 poison to Jimmy Kudo.^{[ch. 1]} He drives a black Porsche 356A. He often gives the other members their orders and supervises group missions. Despite his aggressive demeanor, he has repeatedly shown to be a highly cunning and deductive man, seeing through any deception perpetrated against him. He is also known as Melkior in a few chapters of the Viz Media English-translated manga.^{[ch. 238]}

Aoyama said that it took him about 30 seconds to design both Gin and Vodka, and that he did not give much thought to Gin, aside from having him be the person in charge. But after realizing the series would be long-running, he added some background later on. He gave Gin specific preferences on cars and guns to make him look cooler, and described him as "your basic, chilly, hard-boiled assassin".^{[vol. 83:cast profiles]}

=== Vodka ===
Voiced by: Fumihiko Tachiki (Japanese); Kyle Hebert (Funimation), Christopher Sabat (Funimation), Edward Bosco (Bang Zoom), David Matranga (Studio Nano) (English)
Portrayed by: Taro Okada

Vodka (ウォッカ, Wokka) is a member of the Black Organization and is Gin's partner. He is usually seen alongside Gin. Unlike Gin, Vodka is slow-witted and easy to trick. His official position is that of secretary in the general oversight division, so he handles most of the research and information for the duo, such as setting up meetings^{[ch. 309–311]}, and relaying information to other members.^{[ch. 54, 345]} He is also known as Kaspar in a few chapters of the Viz Media English-translated manga.^{[ch. 238]}

Aoyama said that it took him about 30 seconds to design both Vodka and Gin. Because he did not expect the duo to appear much until the manga's ending, Vodka is very simple-looking. Not wanting all of the men in black to be hyper-competent, he is a John Watson-like foil for Gin and the others. He is always drawn wearing sunglasses, so Aoyama said that not even he knows what his eyes look like.^{[vol. 83:cast profiles]}

=== Vermouth ===
Voiced by: Mami Koyama (Japanese); Laura Post (Bang Zoom), Colleen Clinkenbeard (Studio Nano) (English)

Vermouth (ベルモット, Berumotto), dubbed Rotten Apple (ラットゥンアップル, Rattun Appuru) by the FBI,^{[ch. 434]} is a mysterious member of the Black Organization.^{[ch. 242]} Her appearance remains the same even after many years, suggesting she has found a way to sustain her youth.^{[ch. 433]} Her true identity is Sharon Vineyard (シャロン・ヴィンヤード, Sharon Vinyādo), a famous American actress. She mastered the skill of disguise alongside her friend Vivian Kudo.^{[ch. 350]} When Sharon died, her daughter Chris Vineyard (クリス・ヴィンヤード, Kurisu Vin'yādo)^{[vol. 34]} attended the funeral. Still, Conan later discovers Sharon had changed her identity to Chris.^{[vol. 42]} She is cold-blooded and unflinching, carrying out the Black Organization's orders in the forms of murders and so forth without remorse. She knows Conan Edogawa's true identity as Jimmy Kudo and Anita Hailey's as Sherry but keeps them a secret from the Black Organization because Jimmy and Rachel saved her life back in New York.^{[vol. 35]}^{[ch. 434]} However, lately, it has been revealed that her protecting Kudo and Moore is not merely because of their salvation but also because of a much greater reason. Sharon wanted to bring down the Black Organization, yet she could not find a good measure. After finding Kudo, she hoped that Kudo would be "the silver bullet" that could destroy the Black Organization. Also, Sharon took Moore as her "most valuable treasure" and was willing to save her and her family from Black Organization. She was also mysteriously cherished by the Boss. She was also a deep and high-witted woman, finding that Mizunashi does not truly loyal to Black Organization.

Aoyama described Vermouth as an evil version of Fujiko Mine from Lupin III, and Vivian Kudo as the good version. He called them "two sides of the same coin", and noted that drawing both of their hairstyles is difficult.^{[vol. 83:cast profiles]}

=== Kir ===
Voiced by: Kotono Mitsuishi (Japanese); Jennifer Losi (Bang Zoom), Elizabeth Maxwell (Studio Nano) (English)

Rena Mizunashi (水無 怜奈, Mizunashi Rena) is originally introduced as a news anchor for local television who had moved from morning television to evening news. Conan discovers that she has been going under the alias Kir (キール, Kīru) in the Black Organization.^{[ch. 48]} In the story where the Black Organization tries to assassinate an upcoming politician, she is tasked to interview the politician at the park where the others can shoot him from afar, but Conan thwarts the attempt. She and Vermouth then try to stage an accident so that the politician will step out of his car and get shot. Still, she ends up getting in an accident instead of Vermouth. She is secretly hospitalized under the watch of the FBI.^{[vol. 49]} The FBI determines that the Rena Mizunashi name is an alias as it is a pun on 007.^{[ch. 550]} Her real name is Hidemi Hondo (本堂 瑛海, Hondō Hidemi).^{[ch. 604]} She is later revealed to be a double agent working within the Black Organization and reporting to the CIA. The FBI manages to place Hidemi back into the Black Organization so she can continue to spy on them. But to prove her loyalty to the Black Organization, Hidemi is ordered to kill Shuichi Akai.^{[ch. 609]} Though under heavy surveillance, she reports information to Jodie Starling.^{[ch. 622]}

=== Chianti and Korn ===
Voiced by: Kikuko Inoue (Japanese); Tamara Ryan (Bang Zoom), Corey Pettit (Studio Nano) (English) (Chianti)
Voiced by: Hiroyuki Kinoshita (Japanese); Kaiji Tang (Bang Zoom), Alex Hom (Studio Nano) (English) (Korn)

Chianti (キャンティ, Kyanti) and Korn (コルン, Korun) are the snipers of the Black Organization.^{[ch. 500]} Chianti is a goth-styled member with a blood thirsty personality.^{[ch. 500]} She is a wild, ruthless assassin who enjoys killing. Her left eyelid bears the tattoo of a swallowtail butterfly's wing. It is implied that she had some sort of relationship with the deceased Organization member Calvados, whose death she blames Vermouth for. Meanwhile, Korn is an elderly man with an emotionless face who enjoys sniping his victims.^{[ch. 500]} He holds a grudge against Vermouth for abandoning Calvados.^{[vol. 83:cast profiles]}

Aoyama designed Chianti as a character that would not "kiss up" to Gin, and thought the butterfly tattoo looked cool. He created all kinds of stories for the character and came up with a catchphrase related to the tattoo, but had to scrap it when he learned snipers shoot with both eyes open. Aoyama described Korn as quiet and reserved, which is rare for Case Closed, and made sure he did not look like any other member of the Black Organization. He also said the character "has some issues" with women.^{[vol. 83:cast profiles]}

=== Rum ===
Voiced by: Shigeru Chiba (Note: Before Rum's identity was revealed in the manga, Rum was only given a computerized altered voice, and the credits of episode 942 and The Darkest Nightmare did not list a voice actor. This was done intentionally so that no one could look up what other characters that voice actor or actress might play in the anime series and easily figure out Rum's identity.) (Japanese); Chris Cason (Bang Zoom), Alex Teixeira (Macias Group) (English)

Rum (ラム, Ramu) is the second in charge of the Black Organization; he is very close to the Boss.^{[ch. 906]} His physical description varies between an older adult, a feminine man, and a strongly built man. Still, all sources agree that he has an artificial eye.^{[ch. 908]} Conan currently suspects an individual named Asaka, who was the bodyguard of Amanda Hughes, a big fan of Kohji Haneda, because the encoded dying message left by Kohji using a broken mirror seems to point to Asaka being Rum.^{[ch. 950]} While it is unclear whether Asaka is Rum or merely related, the Black Organization itself has confirmed the decoding "ASACA RUM" to be correct by being paranoid about things named "Asaca" with a C connected to a 17-year ago timeframe.^{[ch. 954]} He inherited the codename from his late father, who had served Renya Karasuma for many years.^{[ch. 1107]}

In 2018, Gosho Aoyama confirmed that Rum is one of three main suspects: Hyoue Kuroda, Rumi Wakasa, and Kanenori Wakita. Rum was revealed to be Kanenori Wakita in 2020.^{[ch. 1066]} Under the alias Kanenori Wakita (脇田 兼則, Wakita Kanenori), he is a sushi chef at Beika Iroha Sushi with an injury to his left eye.^{[ch. 975]} His name is an anagram of "Toki wa kane nari", the Romanization of "時は金なり" ("time is money" in Japanese).

=== That Person ===
The boss of the Black Organization has been referred to as Ano Kata (あの方) or "That Person" in English by his subordinates. He directs the Black Organization's activities and plans crimes to protect the Organization and advance its interests. He communicates to subordinates by text messages. His contact email address follows the tune of the children's song "Seven Baby Crows" (七つの子, Nanatsu no Ko); the number is #969#6261.^{[ch. 475]} He is responsible for promoting agents and deciding on their code names; however, the boss has no own code name himself. Instead, he's referred to as "That Person" or "Boss." His name has been a long-kept secret, but on December 14, 2017, Aoyama revealed his identity to be Renya Karasuma (烏丸蓮耶, Karasuma Ren'ya).^{[ch. 1008]} Renya Karasuma was first mentioned in volume 30 of the manga and made a brief cameo appearance but only a silhouette of him was shown, he has yet to make his first actual appearance. Not much is known about Renya Karasuma, only that he is 99 years old and is said to have already died 40 years before the start of the story. Still, the circumstances of his death are described as 'quite mysterious,' and no details about his cause of death are known.^{[ch. 300]} Yusaku Kudo also told Conan that if Karasuma is still alive, which he appears to be, Conan may designate Japan's richest and most powerful man as his enemy, to which Conan responds that this is exactly what he has been longing to do since he was turned back into a child.^{[ch. 1008]}

=== Other Black Organization members ===
Akemi Miyano

Voiced by: Sakiko Tamagawa (Japanese); Clarine Harp (episode 14; Funimation), Alex Valle (Countdown to Heaven; Funimation), Rebecca Davis (Bang Zoom), Macy Anne Johnson (Studio Nano) (English)

Akemi Miyano (宮野 明美, Miyano Akemi), dubbed Kendra Miyano by Funimation, is a low ranking member of the Black Organization under the alias Masami Hirota (広田 雅美, Hirota Masami), dubbed Michelle Hamlin in the Funimation anime. She is Shiho Miyano's late older sister and also Shuichi Akai's lover.^{[ch. 181]} Unlike her sister, she was never considered a high-ranking member of the Organization and managed to live a mostly normal life, traveling about freely and going to school. She steals one billion yen to use as a bargaining chip to free her little sister from the Black Organization but is killed by Gin.^{[ch. 16]}^{[vol. 49:character guide]} Aoyama remarked that he was going to introduce Anita sooner but because Akemi had not died in the anime adaptation for a while, he gave up and introduced Anita in volume 18.^{[vol. 83:cast profiles]}

Tequila

Voiced by: Kōsei Hirota (Japanese); Andrew Chandler (English)

Tequila (テキーラ, Tekīra) is a large intimidating member of the Black Organization who muscles people into making deals with his syndicate.^{[ch. 114]} He is killed by a briefcase bomb which was meant for another person.^{[ch. 115]}^{[vol. 49:character guide]} Before his death, he was negotiating with a famous computer system programmer, Suguru Itakura, and asked him if he could develop some software program that would be useful for the Organization.

Pisco

Voiced by: Yasuo Maramatsu (Japanese); Jason Douglas (English)

Pisco (ピスコ, Pisuko) is a 71-year-old man named Kenzo Masuyama (枡山 憲三, Masuyama Kenzō), who was a chairman for an auto manufacturer. He was also close friends with Shiho's parents, although this does not shake his resolve to kill her. Gin kills him on orders from the boss for breaking the Organization's code of secrecy after being photographed as he committed a murder.^{[ch. 242]}^{[vol. 49:character guide]}

Calvados

Calvados (カルバドス, Karubadosu) is a sniper who covers Vermouth in her confrontation with Jodie while trying to kill Sherry. However, he is disabled by Shuichi Akai and then commits suicide to avoid being taken in by the FBI.^{[ch. 432–434]}

Rikumichi Kusuda

Voiced by: Mitsuo Iwata

Rikumichi Kusuda (楠田 陸道, Kusuda Rikumichi) was sent by the Organization to search for Rena Mizunashi in Haido Central Hospital. He pretends to be a patient with a cervical vertebrae sprain to move around the hospital without suspicion.^{[ch. 597]} Kusuda flees when his cover is blown but commits suicide when he sees Akai is following him.^{[ch. 598]} His corpse is used to fake Akai's death.^{[ch. 609]}

Ki'ichiro Numabuchi

Voiced by: Naoki Tatsuta (Japanese); Barry Yandell (English)

Ki'ichiro Numabuchi (沼淵 己一郎, Numabuchi Kiichirō), dubbed Cornelius Graver by Funimation, is a former member of the Black Organization. In his first appearance, Ki'ichiro becomes the prime suspect in a serial murder case where his driving school classmates were killed one by one. His innocence is proven, and the real killer is brought to justice after a suicide attempt.^{[ch. 19]} According to Anita, Ki'ichiro himself is a serial killer, having murdered three people for the thrill of it before the series started. Because of this, he was recruited to be one of the Black Organization's assassins, but Ki'ichiro's mental instability excused him from these duties.^{[ch. 35]} He was planned to be a test subject for the APTX 4869 poison. Still, he escaped and killed three additional people he believed to be Black Organization agents. Despite being a ruthless murderer, he calls fireflies his childhood friends. He has a fondness for children, as seen when he carries a lost Mitch to safety who was attempting to collect fireflies of his own. He surrenders to authorities without resistance and awaiting execution for his past murders.^{[ch. 35]}

== Law Enforcement ==
=== Tokyo Metropolitan Police Department ===
The characters of the Tokyo Metropolitan Police as seen in the anime. From left to right, Yumi Miyamoto, Kazunobu Chiba, Ninzaburo Shiratori, Miwako Sato, Wataru Takagi, and Inspector Joseph Meguire.

The Tokyo Metropolitan Police is the law enforcement agency of Tokyo Prefecture. The most commonly recurring characters of the Tokyo MPD are members of Division 1 of the Criminal Investigation Section: Inspector Joseph Meguire; his subordinate officers Wataru Takagi, Miwako Sato, Nicholas Santos and Kazunobu Chiba; and Meguire's new superior, Hyoe Kuroda. Officer Yumi Miyamoto and Naeko Miike of the Traffic Division also appear often.

==== Wataru Takagi ====
Voiced by: Wataru Takagi (Japanese); Doug Burks (Funimation), Christopher Bevins (Bang Zoom), Diego Klock-Perez (Macias Group), Aaron Campbell (Studio Nano) (English)
Portrayed by: Yuichi Tsuchiya

Wataru Takagi (高木 渉, Takagi Wataru), dubbed Harry Wilder by Funimation, is an officer who works for Meguire. He has feelings for his fellow officer Miwako Sato,^{[ch. 171]}. Eventually, Sato and Takagi became romantically involved as an official couple.^{[ch. 673]} Though he has an appearance of ineffectual nervousness, he is quick to assess a situation and take immediate and decisive action when necessary. He is extremely selfless and very kind, he is also very dedicated to his job. He has a knack for getting out of situations out of sheer luck.^{[ch. 269, 673, 804]} He is named after his voice actor, having gotten the name during an episode recording in which the character was asked his name and the voice actor ad-libbed the reply "It's Takagi".

==== Miwako Sato ====
Voiced by: Atsuko Yuya (Japanese); Kate Oxley (Funimation), Katelyn Gault (Bang Zoom), Sarah Bartels (Macias Group), Natalie Van Sistine (Studio Nano) (English)
Portrayed by: Natsuhi Ueno

Miwako Sato (佐藤 美和子, Satō Miwako), dubbed Michele Simone by Funimation, is a smart, physically capable, energetic, and a dedicated young police assistant inspector who works for Inspector Meguire.^{[ch. 208]} She is hugely popular with the male members of the police department, but is at first, oblivious to the fact that her colleague Wataru Takagi likes her romantically. However, she gradually develops feelings for him as well.^{[ch. 330, 404]} Eventually, Takagi and Sato became romantically involved as an official couple.^{[ch. 673]}

==== Nicholas Santos ====
Voiced by: Kaneto Shiozawa (1997–2000), Kazuhiko Inoue (2000–present) (Japanese); Eric Vale (Funimation), Greg Chun (Bang Zoom), Christopher Diaz (Macias Group), Phil Parsons (Studio Nano) (English)

Nicholas Santos, also officially known as Ninzaburo Shiratori (白鳥 任三郎, Shiratori Ninzaburō), is introduced as a recently promoted officer who works with Inspector Meguire. He is a member of the 1st Investigation Division. He has unrequited feelings towards Miwako Sato and often tries to interfere in Sato and Takagi's dates^{[ch. 209–210]}^{[vol. 49:character guide]} In later chapters, he reveals the feelings originated from a young girl in his childhood who had a strong sense of justice and resembled Sato physically.^{[ch. 687]} After meeting Conan Edogawa's elementary school teacher, Sumiko Kobayashi, Santos realizes she is the girl from his past and develops a relationship with her.^{[ch. 689]} He is known to have good knowledge of wine and architecture. In Japanese, he has been voiced by Kaneto Shiozawa and Kazuhiko Inoue after Shiozawa's death in May 2000.

==== Yumi Miyamoto ====
Voiced by: Yu Sugimoto (Japanese); Amanda Lee (Bang Zoom), Crystal Lopez (Macias Group), Krystal LaPorte (Studio Nano) (English)

Yumi Miyamoto (宮本 由美, Miyamoto Yumi) is a police assistant inspector in the traffic department. She is friends with Miwako Sato and tries to push both Sato and colleague Wataru Takagi towards each other in a relationship.^{[vol. 30]}^{[vol. 49:character guide]} After learning that her subordinate Naeko Miine likes Chiba, she gets a bit jealous that she is the sole person among her police friends who isn't in a relationship.^{[vol. 75]}. Yumi is in a relationship with Shukichi Haneda. ^{[ch. 902]}

==== Kazunobu Chiba ====
Voiced by: Isshin Chiba (Japanese); Chris Cason (Funimation), Jason Charles Miller (Bang Zoom), Alexander Blanco (Macias Group), Aaron Michael (Studio Nano) (English)

Kazunobu Chiba (千葉 和伸, Chiba Kazunobu) is Takagi's partner and colleague.^{[vol. 49:character guide]} He is a light-hearted officer and a fan of tokusatsu shows who mostly makes cameo appearances as an officer in the background. He had a crush on a girl named Naeko Miike when he was young and shared mutual affection. Unbeknownst to him, Naeko Miike recently transferred to the Tokyo Metropolitan Police Department.^{[ch. 741–742]} Naeko Miike and Kazunobu Chiba are currently an official couple.^{[ch. 1017]}

==== Naeko Miike ====
Voiced by: Rie Tanaka (Japanese); Anairis Quiñones (Bang Zoom), Ann Marie Olson (Macias Group) (English)

Naeko Miike (三池 苗子, Miike Naeko) is a young female police officer who works in the Tokyo MPD traffic department directly under Yumi Miyamoto. She is Chiba's childhood friend and love interest.^{[ch. 742]} Naeko Miike and Kazunobu Chiba are currently an official couple.^{[ch. 1017]}

==== Inspector Yuminaga ====
Voiced by: Natsuo Tokuhiro

Inspector Yuminaga (弓長警部, Yuminaga-keibu) is from the Arson Investigation Section 1 of the First Division, who therefore deals with arson cases. Richard Moore, who was his subordinate, nicknamed him "fiery old fossil".

==== Kristopher McLaughlin ====
Voiced by: Seizō Katō (Japanese); Bob Carter (English)

Kristopher McLaughlin, also officially known as Kiyonaga Matsumoto (松本 清長, Matsumoto Kiyonaga), is the superior officer of Inspector Meguire and his subordinates.^{[ch. 78]}^{[vol. 49:character guide]} His brutish appearance and the scar running down his left eye easily hide the fact that he is a caring, if somewhat stern, father figure. He is widowed and has a single daughter, named Sayuri.^{[ch. 78]} He received the scar on his face during a confrontation with a serial killer fifteen years prior to the series.^{[ch. 667]} Recently, he has been promoted and his position taken over by Hyoe Kuroda.^{[ch. 920]}

==== Hyoe Kuroda ====
Voiced by: Yukimasa Kishino (Japanese); Richard Epcar (Bang Zoom), Rio Chavarro, Chris Jahn (Macias Group) (English)

Hyoe Kuroda (黒田 兵衛, Kuroda Hyōe) is the former Nagano Police First Division Chief. He is currently the Tokyo Police First Division Managing Officer after replacing Kiyonaga Matsumoto, who has been promoted.^{[ch. 920]} He had been in a coma for ten years due to an accident and had pitch-black hair before that.^{[ch. 914]} His right eye was injured during that accident, and it is replaced with an artificial one.^{[ch. 920]} He was one of the three suspects of Rum.

=== Osaka Prefecture Police ===
==== Heizo Hartwell ====
Voiced by: Takehiro Koyama (Japanese); Andrew T. Chandler (Funimation), Rick Zieff (Bang Zoom), Chris Jahn (Macias Group) (English)

Heizo Hartwell, also officially known as Heizo Hattori (服部 平蔵, Hattori Heizo) and as Martin Hartwell in the Funimation dub, is Harley's father and the Commissioner of the Osaka Prefectural Police;^{[vol. 49:character guide]} he is Superintendent Supervisor (Rank 2). Shizuka Hattori is his wife. At times, he is supportive of his son's desire to be a detective. Heizo has occasionally assisted his son in cracking a difficult case. Though he has a tough exterior, he is a devoted father, family member, and friend. In the Osaka district, he is close with Goro Otaki and Ginshiro Toyama. Harley initially met Toyama's daughter, Kazuha, as a result of Heizo's friendship with Ginshiro Toyama. Heizo was named after the fictional Heizo Hasegawa and the real-life Hattori Hanzō.^{[vol. 15]}

==== Ginshiro Toyama ====
Voiced by: Masato Sako (1998), Shinji Ogawa (2002–2013), Masaki Terasoma (2017–present) (Japanese); Doug Burks (Funimation), Kyle Hebert (Bang Zoom), Alex Teixeira (Macias Group) (English)

Ginshiro Toyama (遠山 銀司郎, Toyama Ginshiro), known as Chief Thomas in the Funimation dub, is the Chief Criminal Investigator (or Chief Detective) in the Osaka police district, and Kazuha's father. He is close friends with Harley's father.^{[vol. 49:character guide]}

==== Goro Otaki ====
Voiced by: Norio Wakamoto (Japanese); Bill Jenkins (Funimation), Paul St. Peter (Bang Zoom), Paul Louis (Macias Group) (English)

Goro Otaki (大滝 悟郎, Otaki Goro), known as Inspector Odin in the Funimation dub, is the chief inspector of the Osaka district and is good friends with Heizo Hattori and Ginshiro Toyama. Otaki is also close friends with Heizo's son, Heiji, who often calls Otaki to find information for an important case. Sometimes, Otaki even assists Heiji and has lent a big helping hand a few times in helping Heiji and Conan solve cases.

=== Nagano Prefecture Police ===
==== Kansuke Yamato ====
Voiced by: Yuji Takada (Japanese); Christopher Diaz (English)

Kansuke Yamato (大和 敢助, Yamato Kansuke) is an officer with the Nagano Prefectural Police who first appears in a case of murders where centipedes are placed by the victims' heads. He is a serious officer who is overly assertive when interrogating suspects. He has a pair of crisscrossed scars over his blinded left eye and a permanently injured left leg due to an avalanche accident that occurred while chasing a criminal.^{[ch. 617]} His name is similar to that of the general and military strategist Yamamoto Kansuke.^{[ch. 682]}

==== Yui Uehara ====
Voiced by: Ami Koshimizu (Japanese); Ghia Burns, Alisha Todd (episode 984) (English)

Yui Uehara (上原 由衣, Uehara Yui) is an officer with the Nagano Prefectural Police and a childhood friend of Kansuke Yamato, whom she is secretly in love with.^{[ch. 616]} Professional and considerate to others, she is the opposite of Kansuke. When Kansuke was presumed dead, Yui resigned from the force and took it upon herself to marry into the Torada (虎田) family to investigate the death of another well-loved colleague.^{[ch. 618]} After the centipede murders case, she rejoins the police force.^{[ch. 681]}

==== Takaaki Morofushi ====
Voiced by: Sho Hayami (Japanese); Rayner Gabriel (English)

Takaaki Morofushi (諸伏 高明, Morofushi Takaaki), nicknamed Kong Ming (高明, Kōmei) after the chancellor from the Romance of the Three Kingdoms, is an inspector with the police force in the Arano Precinct of Nagano Prefecture. Since elementary school, he and Yamato have been rivals, and he is the older brother of Hiromitsu Morofushi.^{[ch. 682, 1021]} Morofushi's exploits as a child served as the basis for the novel Little Kong Ming of Class 2-A, with another character in it based on Kansuke. Morofushi cherishes the book, keeping it in the glove compartment of his car, as the author was a childhood friend of his who died.^{[ch. 684]} Morofushi graduated with honors from a top university. Still, when he joined the Nagano Prefectural Police, he never bothered to apply to become a ranked officer.^{[ch. 682]} When Kansuke went missing in the case that caused his injuries, Morofushi ignored his orders, tracked down the suspect, and helped save Kansuke. But as punishment, he was demoted to an inspector of the local precinct.^{[ch. 684]} He often quotes phrases from Romance of the Three Kingdoms, is rather impulsive, and prefers to work alone.^{[vol. 65]}

=== Other prefecture police ===
==== Misao Yamamura ====
Voiced by: Toshio Furukawa (Japanese); Kent Williams (Funimation), Rayner Gabriel (Macias Group), Travis Mullenix (Studio Nano) (English)

Misao Yamamura (山村 ミサオ, Yamamura Misao), dubbed Detective Magnum by Funimation, is a young police officer from the Gunma Prefecture.^{[ch. 136]} He is naive, clumsy, not very bright and often tries to record the deductions of the sleeping Richard Moore on film but usually fails to do so. Since Conan has tranquilized him to reveal murderers so often, Yamamura was promoted to police inspector.^{[vol. 69]}

==== Sango Yokomizo ====
Voiced by: Akio Otsuka (Japanese); Dameon Clarke (Funimation), Bradley Gareth (Studio Nano) (English)

Sango Yokomizo (横溝 参悟, Yokomizo Sango), dubbed Inspector Worthington by Funimation, is a police officer originally seen with the Saitama police,^{[ch. 59]} before being transferred to Shizuoka.^{[ch. 74]}^{[vol. 49:character guide]} He is quite a capable officer. He comes as intimidating due to speaking loudly and getting close to a suspect's face.

==== Jugo Yokomizo ====
Voiced by: Akio Otsuka

Jugo Yokomizo (横溝 重悟, Yokomizo Jugo) is an inspector for the Kanagawa police and the twin brother of Sango Yokomizo.^{[ch. 348]} Both started their police career in Saitama, but sometime later, Sango transferred to the Shizuoka district. However, they do stay in touch and have even assisted each other in various (and even locally unrelated) cases.

=== FBI ===
The fictional Federal Bureau of Investigation in the series consists of many agents led by James Black.^{[ch. 435]} They are investigating Sharon Vineyard and have followed her to Japan where they discovered the existence of the Black Organization.^{[ch. 435]}

==== Jodie Starling ====
Voiced by: Miyuki Ichijo (2001–2023), Yumi Tōma (young) (Japanese); Maureen Price (Bang Zoom), Bryn Apprill (Studio Nano) (English)

Jodie Starling (ジョディ・スターリング, Jodi Sutāringu) is introduced as Rachel Moore's new English teacher from America under the name of Jodie Saintemillion (ジョディ・サンテミリオン, Jodi Santemirion).^{[ch. 270]} She enjoys video games and is easy-going outside the classroom.^{[vol. 29, 30]} She is later revealed to be an FBI agent with a personal vendetta against Vermouth who murdered her father.^{[ch. 433]} She knows of Conan Edogawa's detective skills and often has him help the FBI to battle the Black Organization. She had been Shuichi Akai's girlfriend before he met Akemi Miyano.^{[ch. 677]}

==== James Black ====
Voiced by: Iemasa Kayumi (2001–2015), Takaya Hashi (2016–2023) (Japanese); Jamieson Price (Bang Zoom), Philip Weber (Studio Nano) (English)

James Black (ジェイムズ・ブラック, Jeimuzu Burakku) is the head of operations on the hunt for the Black Organization in Japan. He first appears in volume 32 as an old guy with glasses and a moustache.^{[vol. 32]} Since his revelation in connection with the FBI, he and his colleagues have worked closely with Conan whenever their common cause would bring them together.^{[ch. 502]}

==== Shuichi Akai ====
Voiced by: Shūichi Ikeda, Yuki Kaji (young) (Japanese); Keith Silverstein (Bang Zoom), Clay Cartland (Macias Group), Christopher Wehkamp (Studio Nano) (English)

Shuichi Akai (赤井 秀一, Akai Shūichi) was first introduced as a mysterious man who wears a knit cap spying on Conan Edogawa.^{[ch. 289]}^{[vol. 34, 35]} He is later revealed to be an FBI agent,^{[vol. 35]} and Jodie Starling's partner.^{[ch. 434]} In the past, he was a spy within the Black Organization. He was given the codename Rye (ライ, Rai) until his identity as an FBI agent was accidentally revealed by André Camel.^{[ch. 599]} Shuichi holds a personal vendetta against the organization for murdering his love interest Akemi Miyano.^{[ch. 599]} Due to his cunning mind and impressive skills, the Black Organization considered him their greatest threat.^{[ch. 607]} He is then shot by Kir in the chest and the head, with his body left in a truck that explodes.^{[ch. 609]} Akai later appears as Subaru Okiya (沖矢 昴, Okiya Subaru), a young blond-haired man with glasses.^{[ch. 622]} He stays at Jimmy Kudo's house with Conan's permission after his apartment has burned down.^{[ch. 624]} He states he is a graduate student concentrating on engineering and is revealed to have high deduction skills, being a fan of Sherlock Holmes.^{[ch. 640]} It is revealed later that he is Shuichi Akai in disguise after his fake death and has come to realize that Conan Edogawa is Jimmy Kudo.^{[vol. 77]}^{[ch. 897]}

Aoyama chose the character's surname name from Char Aznable, a fictional character from the Mobile Suit Gundam series, who is nicknamed "The Red Comet" (赤い彗星のシャア, Akai Suisei no Shā). As for the personal name, he took it from Char's voice actor, Shūichi Ikeda. When Akai was set to appear in the anime, Aoyama requested Shūichi Ikeda to be the voice actor. The author said that Subaru's hairstyle was taken from Char from Gundam and Chiaki from Nodame Cantabile.^{[vol. 83:cast profiles]}

==== André Camel ====
Voiced by: Kiyoyuki Yanada (2008–2022), Kenji Nomura (2022–present) (Japanese); Chris Tergliafera (English)

André Camel (アンドレ・キャメル, Andore Kyameru) is a brutish-looking FBI agent introduced in the storyline when the FBI was planning to move Rena Mizunashi out of the hospital.^{[ch. 600]} In the past, he accidentally exposed Shuichi Akai's identity as an FBI agent to the Black Organization and impeded his mission as a spy.^{[ch. 607]} He felt his mistake caused Akai's love interest to be killed by the Black Organization and has thus felt indebted to Akai ever since.^{[ch. 607]} Camel is named after Lieutenant Dren from Mobile Suit Gundam, who is the second-in-command of Camel Squadron under Char Aznable.^{[vol. 58:afterword]}

=== Public Security Bureau ===
In the series, the National Police Agency Security Bureau (usually along with Tokyo Metropolitan Police Department Public Security Bureau collectively called the Public Security Police (公安警察 Kōan-keisatsu)) sent Rei Furuya and Scotch to infiltrate the Black Organization. Rei found Shuichi standing over Scotch's dead body holding a smoking gun a few years ago. He believes that Scotch was killed by him, who was also infiltrating the Black Organization on behalf of the FBI at the same time.^{[ch. 938]} As a result, Rei Furuya hated Shuichi and the FBI generally and hoped they would leave Japan altogether.^{[ch. 892]}

==== Rei Furuya ====
Voiced by: Tōru Furuya (2012–2024), Takeshi Kusao (2025–present), Mariya Ise (young) (Japanese); Kyle McCarley, Howard Wang Kimlinh Tran (young) (Bang Zoom), Jason Kesser (Macias Group) (English)

Rei Furuya (降谷 零, Furuya Rei) is an agent of the National Police Agency Security Bureau Security Planning Division (警察庁警備局警備企画課, Keisatsuchō Keibi-bu Keibi-Kikaku-ka). He is also known as Toru Amuro (安室 透, Amuro Tōru)^{[ch. 793]} and working undercover in the Black Organization with the codename Bourbon (バーボン, Bābon).^{[ch. 801]} Rei feigns interest in being Richard's apprentice^{[ch. 793–801]} in order to gather information on Shiho Miyano.^{[vol. 77]} After Shiho fakes her death, he begins to suspect Conan of being the one behind Richard's deductions. Due to a past incident, he despises Shuichi Akai and later discovers that he is still alive. He planned to turn Shuichi over to the Black Organization to gain the Organization's trust and get closer to the heart of the Organization. However, Conan managed to outsmart his plan with the help of Shuichi. He is often seen working with Vermouth, but it is unclear how much they trust or know about each other. It is revealed that he knows Vermouth's relationship with the boss.

Aoyama described Rei as the first character in Case Closed to have dark skin and bleached hair. Although his previous series Yaiba had a similar character named Jewel, cutting screentone for light hair was difficult back then, and digital technology had since made it a lot easier.^{[vol. 83:cast profiles]} The name Toru Amuro is derived from the names of voice actor Tōru Furuya and the Mobile Suit Gundam character Amuro Ray.

==== Hiromitsu Morofushi ====
Voiced by: Hikaru Midorikawa (Japanese); Chris Flores (English)

Hiromitsu Morofushi (諸伏 景光, Morofushi Hiromitsu) was an undercover member of the Tokyo Metropolitan Police Department Public Security Bureau inside the Black Organization with the codename Scotch (スコッチ, Sukotchi).^{[ch. 898]} He is the younger brother of Takaaki Morofushi.^{[ch. 1021]} Not much has been revealed about his past and his time inside the organization. Nonetheless, he was acquainted with Rei Furuya, an undercover agent from the same organization, and Shuichi Akai, an undercover FBI agent using the alias Dai Moroboshi.^{[ch. 937]} Vermouth mentions that Scotch was killed before his real name was revealed to the other Black Organization members.^{[ch. 898]} It is revealed that Scotch's death was a suicide.^{[ch. 957]}

== Other recurring characters ==
=== Yoko Okino ===
Voiced by: Yuri Amano (1996–1998), Miki Nagasawa (2001–present) (Japanese); Elise Baughman (Funimation), Emi Lo (Bang Zoom), Nia Celeste (Studio Nano) (English)
Portrayed by: Becky

Yoko Okino (沖野 ヨーコ, Okino Yōko) is a young pop star idol who is a regular focus of worship by Richard Moore.^{[ch. 6]} She has a number of appearances throughout the series, mostly as a prominent guest at some social gatherings which turn into criminal cases.^{[ch. 322]} In one of the cases, she is revealed to be a former member of a girl group called Earth Ladies.^{[vol. 32]}

=== Booker Kudo ===
Voiced by: Hideyuki Tanaka (Japanese); Randy Tallman (Funimation), John Swasey (The Phantom of Baker Street; Funimation), Keith Silverstein (Bang Zoom), Tom Henry (Studio Nano) (English)

Booker Kudo, also officially known as Yusaku Kudo (工藤 優作, Kudō Yūsaku), is Jimmy Kudo's father.^{[ch. 49]} He is a famous author of detective stories and created the popular Night Baron (闇の男爵, Yami no Danshaku) character.^{[ch. 51]} He is extremely intelligent, with deduction skills even superior to Jimmy's, and often helped the police solve cases in the past.^{[ch. 138]} He was the one who created the name Kaito Kid from the Phantom Thief 1412 moniker.^{[ch. 573]} It was even hinted that he may have known Toichi Kuroba was the Kaito Kid he was facing.

=== Vivian Kudo ===
Voiced by: Sumi Shimamoto (Japanese); Laurie Steele (Funimation), Erika Harlacher (Bang Zoom), Jad Saxton (Studio Nano) (English)

Vivian Kudo, also officially known as Yukiko Kudo (工藤 有希子, Kudō Yukiko), is Jimmy Kudo's mother and wife of Booker Kudo.^{[ch. 49]} Her maiden name is Fujimine (藤峰).^{[ch. 414]} She was a former actress who was trained in the art of disguise by Toichi Kuroba but gave up her career at age twenty to marry Booker.^{[ch. 49, 573]} She occasionally shows up in Japan to see her son. Because of her reputation as the wife of a famous mystery author and for involving herself in some criminal cases which she occasionally helps to solve, she has been given the nickname "The Night Baroness" after the main character that her husband created for his mystery novels.^{[ch. 351]}

Aoyama described Vivian as a good version of Fujiko Mine from Lupin III, and Vermouth as the bad version.^{[vol. 83:cast profiles]} He called them "two sides of the same coin", and said that drawing both of their hairstyles is difficult; Vivian received hers from Fujiko.^{[vol. 83:cast profiles]} The Yukiko Fujimine name combines Fujiko Mine and the first name of Fujiko's former voice actress, Yukiko Nikaido.

=== Eva Kaden ===
Voiced by: Gara Takashima (Japanese); Julie Mayfield (Funimation), Mari Devon (Case Closed Episode One), Jane Alan (Zero the Enforcer) (Bang Zoom), Lydia Mackay (Studio Nano) (English)
Portrayed by: Nene Otsuka

Eva Kaden, also officially known as Eri Kisaki (妃 英理, Kisaki Eri) and dubbed Eva Kadan by Funimation, is Rachel Moore's lawyer mother who has been separated from Richard for the last ten years.^{[ch. 107]} She is known as the Queen of the legal world.^{[ch. 267]} She still wears her wedding ring and still cares for him, but is not above testing his love for her.^{[ch. 107, 163–165]} She is also highly skilled in Judo, having been taught by Richard,^{[ch. 107]} but bad at cooking skills and has a Russian Blue kitten named Ricky (Goro in Japan) that was based on Richard's name.^{[ch. 529]} 20 years ago, she and Vivian Kudo were classmates at Teitan High; they were so popular that the school had to cancel their beauty pageant.^{[ch. 412]} Her name, Eri Kisaki, originates from Ellery Queen;^{[vol. 11]} Kisaki (妃) means "Queen" in Japanese.

=== Kaito Kid ===
Originally the protagonist of Gosho Aoyoma's Magic Kaito series, Kaito Kid (怪盗キッド, Kaitō Kiddo) is a gentleman thief who employs the use of magic tricks to steal gems in his heists.^{[ch. 157]} He is a master of disguise and often escapes from the police through the use of his hang glider. He appears in Case Closed to perform daring thefts while a large audience watches.^{[ch. 453, 631]} His true identity is Kaito Kuroba (黒羽 快斗, Kuroba Kaito). His striking resemblance to Jimmy Kudo allows him to impersonate Jimmy without the use of a mask.

=== Makoto Kyogoku ===
Voiced by: Nobuyuki Hiyama (Japanese); Christian LaMonte (Bang Zoom), Alex Machado (Macias Group) (English)

Makoto Kyogoku (京極 真, Kyōgoku Makoto) is Serena Sebastian's long distance boyfriend. Dubbed "The Prince of Kicks", he is the captain of his karate team at Haido High School. He first became interested in Serena after seeing her cheering on her friend Rachel at a martial arts tournament.^{TV special 6} The two later fell deeper in love when he saved her from a knife attack at a summer villa, confessing his feelings for her afterwards.^{[ch. 221]}

=== Sumiko Kobayashi ===
Voiced by: Yuko Kato (Japanese); Stephanie Young (Funimation), Alisha Todd (Macias Group), Madeleine Broseh (Studio Nano) (English)

Sumiko Kobayashi (小林 澄子, Kobayashi Sumiko), dubbed Liz Faulkner by Funimation, is the Junior Detective League's class teacher.^{[ch. 154]} Actually a kind person, in her initial period at Teitan Elementary she was harsh and strict to her students, which was in fact prompted by a previous bad experience and her innate stage fright.^{[ch. 155]} With the help of Conan and the junior detectives she has warmed considerably, and after having seen the Junior Detective League in action she has even appointed herself as their advisor.^{[ch. 517]} When she wears contacts, she resembles officer Sato.^{[ch. 515]} It is later revealed that she had a past childhood encounter with Inspector Shiratori and develops a relationship with him.^{[ch. 689]}

=== Tomoaki Araide ===
Voiced by: Hideyuki Hori (Japanese); Nicholas Markgraf (English)

Tomoaki Araide (新出 智明, Araide Tomoaki) is a young doctor and the son of Richard Moore's physician.^{[ch. 234]} He was once the basketball coach at Rachel's school and, upon their first encounter, thought to be a rival to Jimmy for Rachel's affection.^{[ch. 234]} He has reappeared in Conan's vicinity on several occasionsーseemingly at least; his identity was used by Vermouth in order to track down Shiho Miyano.^{[ch. 432]} He was almost murdered by her to facilitate the cover, but the FBI had temporarily moved him to safety in America.^{[ch. 457]}

=== Jirokichi Sebastian ===
Voiced by: Ichirō Nagai (2004–2014), Kōsei Tomita (2014–2020), Masaharu Satō (2022–present) (Japanese); John Snyder (Bang Zoom), Alex Teixeira (Macias Group) (English)

Jirokichi Sebastian, also officially known as Jirokichi Suzuki (鈴木 次郎吉, Suzuki Jirokichi), is a glory hounding seventy-two-year-old man and Serena Sebastian's uncle.^{[ch. 453]} Despite his age, he is very fit and is an active industrial advisor for the Suzuki company. Ever since Kaito Kid stole his place on the paper's front page, he had been obsessed with catching Kid to raise his fame.^{[ch. 631]} He loves to ride his customized accelerated motorcycle with his dog Lupin.^{[ch. 453]} His great wealth allows him to buy top-notch security and several ways of lockdown to surround Kid, but so far, none of his plans have worked. Even when Kaito Kid's theft is foiled, Conan usually ends up taking up the news spotlight.^{[ch. 631]}

=== Eisuke Hondo ===
Voiced by: Junko Noda

Eisuke Hondo (本堂 瑛祐, Hondō Eisuke) is Rachel Moore's very clumsy new classmate, eager to see the Sleeping Detective in action.^{[ch. 508]} Conan suspects his actions may be an act as he was able to enter Richard's office undetected, and his behavior in checking with a child on whether he told the truth resembles that of Rena Mizunashi.^{[ch. 550–551]} It is later revealed that Eisuke believed that Rena murdered his sister and father when in actuality, Rena was his sister under an alias.^{[ch. 604]} Eisuke had leukemia when he was younger, and when Rena was his donor in a bone marrow transplant, his blood type changed from O to AB.^{[ch. 604]} Eisuke, after learning of his father and sister's career as CIA agents, turns down witness protection from the FBI, but then plans to go to America to pursue a career as a CIA agent. He tells Conan that he is going to confess his love to Rachel because of her kindness, but gives up when he sees Conan's reaction, and then reveals that he has known all along that Conan is Jimmy, having observed Richard's deductive style changing since Jimmy's disappearance and Conan's appearance.^{[ch. 621]}

=== Masumi Sera ===
Voiced by: Noriko Hidaka (Japanese); Jenny Yokobori (Bang Zoom), Ghia Burns (Macias Group) (English)

Masumi Sera (世良 真純, Sera Masumi) is a female teenage detective who has taken an interest in Conan's affairs; she enrolls at Jimmy and Rachel's high school.^{[ch. 768–770]} She has two older brothers, Shuichi Akai and Shukichi Haneda.^{[ch. 972]} She is skilled at jeet kune do,^{[ch. 768]} a hobby encouraged by her brother Shuichi who mailed her instruction videos while in elementary school.^{[ch. 859]} It is revealed that she knows Conan is Jimmy Kudo, and she had met him and Rachel 10 years ago at a beach somewhere in Japan.^{[ch. 972]} She lived in Britain for three years.^{[ch. 971]}

The girl detective Natsuki Koshimizu that appears in volume 54 of Case Closed was very popular, to the point that Aoyama received an offer to make a video game about her. However, she turned out to be the murderer in that case and everyone told him that this was a shame, so he created Masumi instead. Aoyama described her as the "ultimate tomboy".^{[vol. 83:cast profiles]}

=== Shukichi Haneda ===
Voiced by: Toshiyuki Morikawa (Japanese); Sean Chiplock (Bang Zoom), Jorge Barranco (Macias Group) (English)

Shukichi Haneda (羽田 秀吉, Haneda Shūkichi) is a professional shogi player, as well as the former boyfriend of Yumi Miyamoto.^{[ch. 847]} He is known as "Master Taiko" (太閤名人, Taikō Meijin) in the world of shogi, a nickname he acquired even before officially earning the rank of Master due to his name using the same characters as Toyotomi Hideyoshi.^{[ch. 849, 899]} Yumi's personal nickname for him is "Squeakichi" (チュウ吉, Chūkichi), because he eats cheese like a mouse.^{[ch. 946]} He is also the middle brother of the Akai family, making him the sibling of Shuichi Akai and Masumi Sera.^{[ch. 972]}

=== Mary Sera ===
Voiced by: Atsuko Tanaka (2014–2022), Takako Honda (2024–present) (Japanese); Amber Lee Connors (English)

Mary Sera (世良 メアリー, Sera Mearī) is a middle-schooler with light hair who has been hiding in various hotels in Tokyo with Masumi Sera. Despite her appearance, she is a middle-aged woman and the mother of Shuichi Akai, Shukichi Haneda and Masumi Sera.^{[ch. 972]} She is an MI6 agent.^{[ch. 1038, 1049]} During the timeline of Holmes' Revelation, Vermouth fed Mary something like APTX 4869, which caused her body to shrink from that of a middle-aged woman to that of a middle-school child, on the Vauxhall Bridge. Vermouth also implied that Elena Miyano is the younger sister of Mary after feeding Mary the drug.^{[ch. 1049]} Her eyes have a remarkable resemblance to those of Shuichi Akai and Masumi Sera.

=== Momiji Ooka ===
Voiced by: Satsuki Yukino (Japanese); Faye Mata (Bang Zoom), Marisa Duran (Studio Nano) (English)

Momiji Ooka (大岡 紅葉, Ōoka Momiji) is a second-year student from Kyoto Senshin High School and a champion of Hyakunin Isshu karuta. She lives in the Higashiyama district of Kyoto. Her family is likely wealthy since she has a personal butler, third to Renya Karasuma and Suzuki plutocrats. She is the granddaughter of former prime minister Mr. Ooka.^{[ch. 1114]} Momiji claims Heiji "proposed her when they were little" and thus believes that they will be romantically involved in the future.^{[ch. 962]}

=== Rumi Wakasa ===
Voiced by: Fumi Hirano (Japanese); Amanda Lopez (English)

Rumi Wakasa (若狭 留美, Wakasa Rumi) is the new Deputy Homeroom Teacher at Teitan Elementary school for Year 1 Class B.^{[ch. 966]} Her personality seems to be that of a clumsy and incapable teacher. She approached the Detective Boys because she was scared of the old warehouse at the school and needed them to come with her.^{[ch. 966]} However, once she was out of sight of the Detective Boys, her personality changed dramatically to that of a skilled fighter with a scary face.^{[ch. 968]} Her right eye suffers from amaurosis fugax.^{[ch. 1106]} Most likely, her name is meant to resemble "ASAKA RUM", the code from Kohji Haneda's death, with the addition of a W and an I. She was one of the three suspects of Rum.^{[ch. 1005, 1051]}

=== Azusa Enomoto ===
Voiced by: Mikiko Enomoto (Japanese); Janice Kawaye (Bang Zoom), Ghia Burns (Macias Group) (English)

Azusa Enomoto (榎本 梓, Enomoto Azusa) is a kind and young worker at the Café Poirot, the coffee shop that is directly under the Moore's Detective Agency. Richard often goes there for a quick coffee break. Azusa sometimes gives Richard a case to solve, mostly involving missing cell phones and cell phone messages.^{[ch. 438]}

=== Tsutomu Akai ===
Voiced by: Koichi Yamadera

Tsutomu Akai (赤井 務武(あかい つとむ), Akai Tsutomu) is the father of Shuichi Akai, Shukichi Haneda, Masumi Sera and husband of Mary Sera. He is an MI6 agent.^{[ch. 1049]} 17 years ago, someone got him involved in the murder case of Kohji Haneda and Amanda Hughes and he disappeared.^{[ch. 949, 972, 1037, 1109]}

=== Koji Haneda ===
Voiced by: Hiroki Yasumoto (Japanese); Carlos Alyeto (English)

Koji Haneda (羽田 浩司, Haneda Kōji) was a talented shogi player and Shukichi Haneda's non-blood brother, either by adoption, marriage, or some other means.^{[ch. 947]} Many had high hopes that Koji would win all seven of the major shogi titles.^{[ch. 947]} He died under mysterious circumstances 17 years ago when he was in the United States participating in a chess tournament, a game he also enjoyed.^{[ch. 947]} He left a dying message on a broken mirror on the floor, with remaining letters as "P-T-O-N" cut from "PUT ON MASCARA".^{[ch. 950]} Conan and Akai interpreted it as "RUM ASACA", but Yusaku Kudo interpreted it as a single name "CARASUMA", pointing to Renya Karasuma.^{[ch. 1008]} Anita Hailey suggests that Koji may have been murdered with APTX 4869 since a person with the same name appeared on the list of people killed by the poison.^{[ch. 947]} Masumi and Mary research his death.^{[ch. 953]} Rumi Wakasa has memories of Koji Haneda before his murder.^{[ch. 1033]} Koji had a shogi bishop as his amulet. The shogi piece was later possessed by Rumi Wakasa after Koji's murder.^{[ch. 1052]}

== Reception ==
The name changes done by Funimation Entertainment and Viz Media were highly criticized. Carlo Santos of Anime News Network criticized how they attempted to Americanize the main characters' names yet the secondary characters were able to keep their Japanese names. Eduardo M. Chavez of Mania.com and Jeffrey Harris of IGN agreed that the name changes were pointless.

Due to the popularity of the series, the characters from the series were used in a pamphlet to introduce the 34th G8 summit and were used to promote general crime fighting. The characters were also featured on commemorative stamps. Statues of Jimmy Kudo, Conan Edogawa, and Rachel Moore are found at Hokuei, Tottori. Several figurines were produced based on the likeness of the characters in the Case Closed series. Many characters were also featured on trading cards from the Case Closed collectible card game.

Vermouth was voted the "Most Likeable Villain" in a 2026 poll of 6,077 people conducted by the digital manga platform Comic Cmoa.
