= Ninja Gaiden (disambiguation) =

Ninja Gaiden is a series of video games released by Tecmo.

Ninja Gaiden may also refer to:

- Ninja Gaiden (arcade game), a 1988 video game
- Ninja Gaiden (NES game), a 1988 video game
- Ninja Gaiden (1991 OVA), aka Ninja Ryūkenden, a 1991 anime OVA film
- Ninja Gaiden (Game Gear), a 1991 video game
- Ninja Gaiden (1992 video game), originally for Master System
- Ninja Gaiden (2004 video game), originally for Xbox
