= Ninja Gaiden: Ragebound =

- Developer: The Game Kitchen
- Publisher: Dotemu
- Director: David Jaumandreu
- Producer: David Jaumandreu
- Artist: Jesús Campos
- Writers: David Jaumandreu; Jordi de Paco; Kevin Sardà
- Composer: Sergio de Prado
- Series: Ninja Gaiden
- Platforms: Nintendo Switch; PlayStation 4; PlayStation 5; Windows; Xbox One; Xbox Series X/S
- Release: July 31, 2025
- Genres: Hack and slash, platform
- Mode: Single-player

Ninja Gaiden: Ragebound is a 2025 hack and slash platform game developed by The Game Kitchen and published by Dotemu under the license of Koei Tecmo. A spin-off of the Ninja Gaiden series created by Team Ninja, Ragebound was released for Nintendo Switch, PlayStation 4, PlayStation 5, Windows, Xbox One, and Xbox Series X/S on July 31, 2025.

== Gameplay ==
Ragebound is a side-scrolling action video game.

Ninja Gaiden: Ragebound is a side-scrolling action video game. In the game, the player assumes control of Kenji Mozu, an aspiring ninja who must protect Hayabusa Village against demons. Kenji wields a katana and excels at melee combat. Most enemies can be killed with one hit, though the game also introduces enemy variants and boss characters who can survive multiple attacks. Occasionally, some enemies are highlighted with either a pink or blue color, requiring players to defeat them using certain techniques. Once they are defeated, Kenji enters a "hypercharged" state, allowing him to kill all types of enemies with one hit. Kenji is very acrobatic, able to dodge, deflect ranged attacks, climb across ceilings, dash in the air, and clamber onto walls. He can also perform a "Guillotine boost", which allows him to strike and bounce off enemies and projectiles. After a player completes a level, their performance is ranked using a grading system.

As the story progresses, Kenji will encounter Kumori, a kunoichi of the Black Spider Clan. Following a deadly encounter, their souls fuse together, allowing Kenji to use Kumori's skill set in combat. Kumori is skilled in ranged combat using kunai and can teleport across short distances, reaching gaps Kenji typically cannot. Players can harvest "Ki" from enemies and used it to summon powerful "Spider Weapons" such as Kama and Chakram. Players can enter an alternate demon dimension through interacting with demon alters in a level. These segments are timed traversal and platforming puzzles in which players, controlling Kumori, must find and access hidden paths that are invisible to Kenji.

== Story ==
Ryu Hayabusa is training promising new recruits for the Dragon Ninja clan when suddenly, the barrier between the world of the demons and the world of humans is shattered. As demons start to pour through the invisible chasm, Ryu gets a letter from his father, telling him to take the Dragon Sword to America and find a certain man that will set off the events of Ninja Gaiden (1988). In his absence, Ryu's protege Kenji Mozu volunteers to defend the village from demon incursion. Meanwhile, the base of the Black Spider Ninja clan is attacked by a separate wave of demons. As the kunoichi Kumori manages to fight off the invaders, the clan's headmaster, Obaba, tasks her with striking a deal with the demons' leader, and using a magical weapon called the Tamashi Kunai to bind their leader to Kumori, and thus to the clan's will. However, the demon lord Jagäzk springs a trap on Kumori before she is able to use the kunai and binds her to a wall. Later, Kenji manages to defeat one of Jagäzk's generals, but is caught in the demon's explosion, barely alive as he lands at the spot where Kumori is held.

With no other options available, Kumori convinces Kenji to stab her with the Tamashi Kunai, and he absorbs her soul into his own body. As the two ninjas fight their way back to the human world, they meet with the old blacksmith Muramasa, who tells them he once fought with the Black Spider Clan's Obaba to seal the Demon Lord ages ago. He tasks the fused rival ninjas with traveling across Japan to collect four powerful crystals before Jagäzk's forces get them, and with their power Jagäzk himself could lead his full army into the human world. Kenji and Kumori fight with the other demon generals and manage to secure the crystals, but upon returning to Muramasa's home, they find themselves facing an unnamed CIA Agent, leading a heavily armed tactical team. The team knocks out Kenji and takes the crystals from his body, putting him and Muramasa in the brig of a US Navy vessel. With the help of Kumori and a woman in a fox mask, Kenji escapes the ship and returns to the mainland, pursuing the CIA Agent who stole the crystals. As they continue pursuing him, Kenji and Kumori learn that the CIA Agent has been using the powers of the crystals to draw energy from the demon world to create monstrous super-soldiers for some unknown purpose.

Kenji and Kumori battle their way through waves of CIA soldiers and rejected experiments, but arrive just in time to see the CIA Agent use the crystals to open the gate of Kû no Tani, planning to demonstrate that his demon-powered super-soldiers can destroy Jagäzk, but Jagäzk kills them all in one blow. Kenji and Kumori then fight Jagäzk in a heated battle, but inside Kû no Tani he cannot truly die, and he further demonstrates his power by ripping Kumori out of Kenji and putting her back in a separate body. The now-separated ninjas realize that one of them will have to stay behind to keep Jagäzk from escaping Kû no Tani while the other destroys the crystals powering the gate outside, and successfully do so. Whichever ninja leaves Kû no Tani behind gets an epilogue scene where they pay their respects to the head of their rival's clan.

== Development ==
The game was developed by The Game Kitchen. Dotemu was given the opportunity by Koei Tecmo to create a 2D Ninja Gaiden game, and approached The Game Kitchen as a development partner as they were impressed by their work on Blasphemous. The studio began working on the project about halfway through the development of Blasphemous II.

A member of the Black Spider Clan was introduced as a secondary playable character as the team felt that it will be interesting for players to control a character who is traditionally an antagonist in the Ninja Gaiden series. While the team was initially inspired by the 3D Ninja Gaiden games and experimented with combo-based combat, they were unable to recreate them in a 2D game and therefore, quickly switched to the format of the older 8-bit and 16-bit Ninja Gaiden games which have a larger emphasis on keeping momentum and finding ways to dispatch enemies effectively. Team Ninja served as a consultant for the game and provided feedback to The Game Kitchen after playing early builds of the game. Sergio de Prado served as Ragebound's composer, with contributions from composers of the original Ninja Gaiden trilogy (Keiji Yamagishi, Ryuichi Niita, and Kaori Nakabai).

Ragebound was announced at The Game Awards in December 2024. Team Ninja declared 2025 as "Year of the Ninja", as Ragebound, Ninja Gaiden 2 Black and Ninja Gaiden 4 were set to be released in the year. The game was released for Nintendo Switch, PlayStation 4, PlayStation 5, Windows, Xbox One, and Xbox Series X/S on July 31, 2025. A physical edition of the game was released by Silver Lining Interactive on September 12, 2025, for PS5 and Nintendo Switch.

== Reception ==
Reception

Aggregate scores
Aggregator	Score
Metacritic	(NS) 87/100 (PC) 84/100 (PS5) 84/100 (XSXS) 83/100
OpenCritic	92% recommend (Note: Score based on 126 reviews)

Review scores
Publication	Score
Famitsu	8/10, 8/10, 8/10, 8/10
Game Informer	9.5/10
GameSpot	8/10
GamesRadar+	4/5
IGN	9/10
Nintendo Life	8/10
PC Gamer (US)	78/100

Ninja Gaiden: Ragebound received "generally favorable" reviews, according to review aggregator platform Metacritic. Fellow review aggregator OpenCritic assessed that the game received "mighty" approval, being recommended by 92% of critics. In Japan, four critics from Famitsu gave the game a total score of 32 out of 40, with each critic awarding the game an 8 out of 10.

IGN gave the game a rating of 9/10, praising the game's artstyle and calling the combat "satisfying". GamesRadar+ lauded the game's difficulty and combat, though criticism was directed at the game's upgrade system. Game Informer praised Ragebound's gameplay and platforming challenges, stating that the game is "hard to put down". Nintendo Life praised the game's stage design and boss battles while criticizing the lack of support for Nintendo Switch 2 which results in frame rate issues. The short length of the game had mixed reception, with PC Gamer praising the lack of gameplay repetition, while GameSpot stated that the game "ends prematurely".
