= Femtogo =

French rapper

Femtogo [fɛm.tɔ.go], stylized as FEMTOGO (formerly Femt0 [fɛm.to], also known as baby hayabusa, is a French musician and founding member of the Rap collective Scarpackage (SPK). Active on SoundCloud since 2020, he developed a style referred to as "Warfare Music", characterized by numerous references to popular cultural and esoteric coded messages.

In March 2026, a number of Femtogo's musical partners, namely Ptite Sœur, neophron, snorunt, Irko, and K. Krueger, published a shared declaration condemning the pedophilic abuse he was purported to have confessed to committing.

== Biography ==
=== Career ===
Femtogo began his artistic career under the pseudonym Femt0, in reference to the supernatural demonic god and primary antagonist of the manga Berserk, known as the "God Hand". He is a founding member of the rap collective Scarpackage (SPK) alongside Irko, Giaco, and Amnezzia.

==== Early work on SoundCloud ====
In May 2022, Femto released the EP Bravo-6, produced by amne. This was followed by One Man Army, produced by neophron, in October 2022. These two projects were the first to appear on Soundcloud.

On August 1 2022, he released the track Undercover on Soundcloud where he stated that "Y a plus de FEMT0, maintenant c'est Femtogo" (FEMTO is no more, now it's Femtogo), making his name change official.

==== baby hayabusa ====
On December 4 2020, Femtogo released his first single Love under the alter ego baby hayabusa, often stylized as baby⌖hayabusa or baby h, and additionally under the name Goofy Van Bozo, derived from the burlesque character Bozo the Clown.

Creating a second Soundcloud account under this name, baby hayabusa took on an independent artistic identity. He released several tracks under the new name, including NOTCH and Blood, before the tracks were removed from the account on October 29 2022.

On June 9 2023, Femtogo released a video on Twitter displaying the character Ryu Hayabusa from the game Ninja Gaiden II, alongside an announcement of the alter ego's return.

In July 2023, the first EP under the alias baby hayabusa, Deadly Poison Sting, produced by neophron, was released. The title makes references to the 'deadly' sting of poison ivy, a mild allergenic plant species of the genus Toxicodendron native to Asia and North America. The track Ivy is based on the album's title.

One year after Deadly Poison Sting's release, on July 13 2024, he released a second EP under the alias titled Faded Flower Story in partnership with neophron.

==== FTP and Closed Chapter ====
In February 2025 Femtogo released his sixth work, the EP Francs-Tireurs Partisans, the title in reference to the Francs-Tireurs et Partisans, a French communist resistance group active during the Second World War.

On May 27 2025, he released his seventh project and final EP of the series Closed Chapter in partnership with the beatmaker Vilhelm, comprising three tracks. This EP was his last collaboration with Vilhelm; the name of the album, Closed Chapter, derives from the name of the series.

On October 10 2025, he released the album Pretty Dollcorpse in partnership with Ptite Sœur and neophron. The album comprises 13 tracks.

=== Pedophilia accusations ===
In March 2026, several of Femtogo's peers, namely Ptite Sœur, neophron, snorunt, Irko, and K. Krueger, published a shared statement condemning the pedophilic abuse he purportedly confessed to having committed. According to the statement, Femtogo confessed to having consumed child pornography and engaging in sexual relations with a minor under the age of 15. The signatories staunchly condemned these acts, asserting that they went against the message conveyed by his music, notably his album Pretty Dollcorpse (2025), where he detailed the sexual violence he was subjected to as a child.

His peers announced that they would end all collaboration with Femtogo, and that they would dissolve Scarpackage. They stated that their thoughts were with the victim and any others who had not yet come forward, and called on the public to disavow (faire le deuil de) any projects they had produced alongside him. Following these revelations, Femtogo's official social media accounts were deactivated.

An Instagram account created shortly before the accusations were brought to light under the pseudonym "Reggie Petrucci" is believed by some to have been created in response to the statement by Femtogo. A teaser for a project titled Confessional Intoxication was announced on the account, though there has not yet been any confirmation by the artist.

The album Confessional Intoxication released on Spotify for 24 hours on the account "Reggie Petrucci". No official statement was done for the release. But was deleted almost instantly, the entire album was reposted by an account called "Menelas". The album is referred as Franc-Tireur-Partisant 2 but no official statement.

No information on a criminal investigation has yet been released by French authorities.

== Discography ==
=== EPs and albums ===
- 2 Piece (2022)
- Bravo-6 (2022)
- One Man Army (2022)
- Deadly Poison Sting (2023, under the alias baby Hayabusa)
- Nameless Belligerent (2023)
- La Bête (2024)
- Faded Flower Story (2024, under the alias baby Hayabusa)
- Francs-Tireurs Partisans (2024)
- Closed Chapter (2025)
- Pretty Dollcorpse (2025)

=== Features ===
- F.A.B (feat. Stranogo)
- House (feat. Stranogo)
- HS (feat. Stranogo)
- SUD (feat. Stranogo)
- Depuis (feat. Irko et Giacoshi)
- 6:AM (feat. Odbussy et Irko)
- moonlight sonata interlude (feat. abel31)
- TALI (feat. Meel B)
- AZALÉE (feat. IDHEM)
- otk (feat. Livio mi6)
- DRAGA DAÏ (Lili Castiglioni Remix)
- TERREURGRÜNT - Ptite soeur
- .50BMG (feat. abel.31)
- jamais - snorunt (under the name baby hayabusa)
- maladie - abel31 (under the name baby hayabusa)
- sometime - neophron (under the name baby hayabusa)
