= Ninja Gaiden (1992 video game) =

- Developer: SIMS
- Publisher: Sega
- Directors: Kouji Inokuchi; Kanako Koyama
- Designer: Kanako Koyama
- Programmer: Kouji Inokuchi
- Composer: Takashi Horiguchi
- Series: Ninja Gaiden
- Platform: Master System
- Release: PAL: July 16, 1992
- Genres: Hack and slash, platform
- Mode: Single-player

Ninja Gaiden is a 1992 hack and slash platform game developed by SIMS and published by Sega for the Master System, with license from Tecmo. The game stars Ryu Hayabusa and is part of the Ninja Gaiden series, although it features a plot not connected to any of the other Ninja Gaiden games. Due to the discontinued support of the console in Japan and North America because of its bad sales, the game was only released in Europe, Australia and other PAL territories, bearing the Ninja Gaiden label instead of the Shadow Warriors one that was usually used for the series by the time in PAL releases.

== Gameplay ==
Gameplay screenshot

The game features similar gameplay mechanics to the previous Nintendo Entertainment System Ninja Gaiden games. Movements, attacks and jumps are performed in the same mood, and special ninja attacks are cast as usually, by pressing Up and Attack simultaneously. This version replaced some features from the NES games with new abilities, such as the ability to climb hand-over-hand or cling to walls in the NES games being replaced by the new wall-to-wall jumping ability in the Master System game, similar to the later 2004 Xbox game and later 3D entries in the Ninja Gaiden series.

== Plot ==
Ryu Hayabusa is a member of the Dragon Ninja clan, who have protected Japan for generations. One day he is away from home, he receives a message that the Dragon Village, home of the Dragon clan, has been brutally massacred. He rushes home finding that all but one of the village members have been killed. The last survivor of the village tells Ryu with his dying breath that the sacred Bushido scroll has been stolen. The Bushido is a scroll of power so strong that its owner can control the world. As the last Ninja of the Dragon clan, the fate of the world is in his hands. He embarks on a trip to regain the Sacred Scroll of Bushido from the hands of the evil Shogun of Darkness and his minions. Some of the minions Ryu must first take on and defeat are the Sumo Wrestler, Yakuza Oyabun, Tsutenkaku Samurai, Jetpack Soldier, Ice Monster, and the Stone Golem.

There are two versions of the game that exist: the first version tells the story through the eyes of Ryu himself, explaining his experiences in great detail, and the second version is narrated from an outside source, but some details of the plot are not explained as much. Furthermore, certain dialogue and names vary between the two versions as well.

== Reception ==
Reception

Review scores
Publication	Score
Computer and Video Games	81%
GameZone	86%
Consoles +	87%
Joypad	90%
Mean Machines	83%
Player One	93%
Sega Force	90%
Sega Force Mega	90%
Sega Master Force	90%
Sega Pro	90%
Zero	90%

Ninja Gaiden for the Master System was critically acclaimed upon release. Sega Force reviewed the game and gave it a score of 90%. The main reviewer Mat Yeo states that Ryu "can jump, fire, use extra weapons and perform a handy trick to reach high ledges. Stand under the ledge, press jump and up to flip Ryu onto it." He stated that he was "well impressed with this game. I loved Ninja Gaiden on the Game Gear and this is a thousand times better!" He concluded that, with "loads of levels, tough villains and a challenging mission to complete, it should satisfy even those who’re sick to death of platform games." Another reviewer Chris Knight stated that the game is "great to look at, the music and in-game effects are nicely atmospheric, and above all, the controls work a treat."

By Summer till Fall 1992, the game was among the top 10 successful selling Master system games at the time. Zero magazine reviewed it and gave a 90% score. The reviewer Patrick McCarthy stated that there are many "enemies to hack and slash," the "graphics are pretty smart," that "the animation and control over the main character are both very good," the player "can leap about from platform to platform," and "there are loads of different special moves" in the game. He concluded that the game "is to the Master System what The Revenge of Shinobi is to the Mega Drive. I love it." One Mean Machines reviewer Rob, stated that the game "boasts excellent graphics," compared its animation quality to Prince of Persia, and praised the responsive controls, "range of weapons and moves" that add replayability, and "large size" of the game. The other reviewer, Rich, stated that the "graphics are excellent" and rival the Mega Drive's visuals, and praised the smooth scrolling, "fast and hectic pace" of the game, and selection of weapons, concluding that it is a "great slash 'em up" for the Master System. The magazine gave the game an overall 83% score.

Sega Master Force reviewed the game in its September 1993 issue, which gave it a score of 90%. The magazine states that "Ryu's death-dealing begins in a forest, where he scales trees, avoids spiked pits and dodges bad ninjas' throwing stars. Defeating an end-of-level sumo, later stages take place against the Tokyo skyline, in a cave, across a frozen landscape and at a temple." It then states that "Bushido scrolls restore energy and give weapons, but it's the controls and your use of them which make this game. Ryu moves like a well-oiled machine and responds quickly." It concludes that "Ninja Gaiden’s enough to satisfy even those who've tired of the platform genre."
