= Warriors All-Stars =

2017 video game

- Developer: Omega Force
- Publisher: Koei Tecmo
- Director: Tomohiko Aoki
- Producer: Masaki Furusawa
- Designer: Kenta Shiraishi
- Programmer: Masayoshi Yamada
- Artist: Yu Oboshi
- Series: Dynasty Warriors
- Platforms: PlayStation 4 PlayStation Vita; Microsoft Windows
- Release: PlayStation 4: JP: March 30, 2017; NA: August 29, 2017; EU: September 1, 2017; PlayStation Vita: JP: March 30, 2017; Microsoft Windows: NA: August 29, 2017; EU: September 1, 2017
- Genre: Hack and slash
- Mode: Single-player

Warriors All-Stars, (Note: (or Musou ☆ Stars (無双☆スターズ, Musō ☆ Sutāzu) in Japan)) is a hack and slash video game by Koei Tecmo. It is a crossover based on the long-running Warriors series, featuring an array of cast taken from various titles owned by the company, similar to the Warriors Orochi series. It was released on March 30, 2017 in Japan for PlayStation 4 and PlayStation Vita. The Microsoft Windows version was released on August 29, 2017 in the US and on September 1, 2017 in Europe.

== Gameplay ==
The gameplay is modeled after the hack-and-slash Warriors series, in which the player controls a single character to defeat enemies throughout a stage while trying to achieve a specific goal. In Warriors All-Stars, each player may also select four supporting characters to assist the chosen character; the supporting characters lend additional abilities that may be triggered by holding down R1 and selecting a face button. Certain pairs of characters, when assisting the character at the same time, may combine their attacks for additional effect.

Although the game uses the Warriors Orochi series as its inspiration, the game engine is highly reminiscent of Samurai Warriors: Spirit of Sanada and gameplay is closer to that of Dynasty Warriors 8: Empires. All characters have a similar movepool of a normal attack chain of six attacks, and six charge attacks, as with the Dynasty Warriors series. In addition, effort was made so that each character's moveset remains true to their series of origin (Ryu Hayabusa, Ayane, and Kasumi, who previously appeared in Warriors Orochi 3, have their movesets entirely redone as a result). Samurai Warriors series characters have their normal and hyper attack chain shortened to accommodate the attack system, though they are given a sixth charge attack to compensate; Dynasty Warriors series characters have some of their charge attacks altered either visually or in their function for this game.

As not every character is armed with a weapon, as is traditional in Warriors games, character growth instead focuses on hero cards, which take the place of weapons in this game. Hero cards may be equipped to a corresponding hero, and grant the hero increased abilities. Each character may have up to twenty cards in their inventory, although only one may be equipped to a character at any given time. Unwanted and excess hero cards may be sold for gold between missions or disassembled for materials that may be spent to enhance other hero cards. Gold may also be spent to level up characters, though only to the highest-leveled character currently available to the player.

The stages featured are themed after the series of origin for the various characters, though some stages are taken from Samurai Warriors 4 and Dynasty Warriors 8 series games, either taken as-is or themed to another series' visuals. (This had also occurred with Warriors Orochi 3 series games as well.) Visuals include a Nara-era Japanese garden and medieval European ruins were featured, based on the Toukiden: The Age of Demons and Atelier titles, respectively. Music for the game primarily consists of remixed versions of theme music from the characters' series of origin. Most themes contain two mixes: a "Starlet Mix" that is primarily orchestral in nature, and a "Stars Mix" that is similar, but places greater prominence on rock instruments, as traditional in the Warriors series, along with a "Guitar" version that adds in guitars to the "Stars Mix".

The game story features a scenario that unfolds based on the initial character chosen at the start of the game. The storyline is nonlinear, and may be advanced at a player's own pace. Most missions do not advance the plot, and merely serve as side missions meant to raise a character's skills and abilities, akin to Free Mode in other Warriors games. "Hero Battles" allow additional characters to be unlocked, while "Key Battles" advance the story. The completion of certain Key Battles may prevent the player from participating in other missions, and some Key Battles may require that characters be unlocked through Hero Battles before they may be played. There are 15 total endings in Warriors All-Stars, necessitating multiple play-throughs in order to experience the complete story.

The game is strictly single-player, though the producers have not ruled out a future update that includes multiplayer functionality.

== Story ==
The primary setting of Warriors All-Stars is a kingdom relying on a magical spring to sustain themselves. When the king of the kingdom suddenly dies and the spring begins to wither, the widowed queen and priestess of the spring, Sayo (小夜, voiced by Aya Endo) informs her three charges, her children Tamaki (環, voiced by Yūki Takada) and Shiki (志貴, voiced by Kazuyuki Okitsu), as well as her nephew Setsuna (刹那, voiced by Yukitoshi Kikuchi), that the spring must be restored using the power of otherworldly heroes. Tamaki summons the heroes using the last of the spring's magic. Each of the three charges recruit heroes to their cause in a race to restore the fountain and claim the throne for themselves.

The game's second mission introduces both rival claimants to the throne and their respective forces. At this point, the story branches off into three broad campaigns, each focusing on one of the royal heirs.

In all three campaigns, it is revealed that a being bent on destruction known as Yomi (夜見, voiced by Aya Endo) was sealed under the spring by the first king and had been siphoning off the life energies of the kings to fuel its resurrection. This in turn had caused a notorious curse that shortened the lifespan of every past ruler of the kingdom; Setsuna merely claims the throne in order to protect Tamaki, the crown princess of the kingdom, from this fate, somehow willing to sacrifice himself in her place. Shiki also seeks to protect Tamaki using the Monument of Dawn, an artifact which provided instructions on how to properly seal Yomi away. Shiki knows that Yomi had also been able to amass enough power to spy on any interlopers trying to seal Yomi away, but does not know the identity of the corrupted individual. Being unable to trust either Tamaki or Setsuna for fear that they may be corrupted, Shiki searches for the Monument of Dawn, only attempting to claim the throne should his effort fail anyway.

If the player meets a special condition at any point of their chosen campaign, the story abruptly switches to a common fourth campaign. In this campaign, each of the three charges recover a piece of the Monument of Dawn, and Shiki concludes that neither Setsuna nor Tamaki had been corrupted by Yomi. However, the Monument of Dawn remains incomplete. When the three ask Sayo about another means of sealing Yomi away, Sayo reveals herself to be the one who's been corrupted, fully resurrects Yomi, and disappears into hiding. The three band together with the heroes that they have each recruited, in order to find the remaining pieces of the Monument of Dawn and seal Yomi away for good.

The heroes and royal heirs divide themselves into two groups in order to distract Yomi. One group eventually finds the other group having been mind-controlled by Yomi. The royal heirs are released using the three divine weapons they wield, while the heroes have to be captured using a purification ritual. As the heroes find more pieces of the Monument of Dawn, they discover that the royal heirs' weapons are the key to sealing away Yomi. However, the three final pieces of the Monument also reveal that Yomi was in fact the wife of the first king and the goddess who created the world; in this form, Yomi had a great resemblance to Sayo (and to a lesser extent, Tamaki), explaining why Sayo was able to harness the energies of the spring in the first place. Yomi had fought alongside the first king to bring peace and prosperity to the world, but was ultimately corrupted in body and mind by the evil that they were trying to fight off. Unable to bear the thought of destroying all that she held dear, Yomi had allowed herself to be sealed away by the first king. The monument was shattered into pieces by advisors of an earlier king who spread the fiction that Yomi was a feared creature. Hidden within the last three pieces was a message from the first king, pleading with his descendants to purify, rather than seal Yomi, using the divine weapons. With the help of their recruited heroes, Tamaki, Shiki and Setsuna vow to carry out this will.

== Characters ==
The game features 30 playable characters, referred to as "Heroes". There are 27 characters spanning 13 Koei Tecmo video game series, as well as three original characters. These original characters are based on the Imperial Regalia of Japan, and they all serve as the main story focus of the game. They are:

- Tamaki: The young princess responsible for summoning heroes from other worlds to help restore her kingdom following her father's death. Though she is chosen as heir to the throne, her right is challenged by other members of the royalty. She wields the Light's Echo, a weapon inspired by the Yata no Kagami. Her voice actress is Yūki Takada.
- Shiki: Former crown prince of the kingdom and Tamaki's older brother, he originally accepted the heir apparent title before renouncing it for unknown reasons. He wields the Moonlight Glow, a weapon inspired by the Yasakani no Magatama. His voice actor is Kazuyuki Okitsu.
- Setsuna: Another member of the royalty and Tamaki and Shiki's cousin, who makes claim for the throne, which originally belonged to his father. He wields the Divine Edge, a weapon inspired by the Kusanagi. His voice actor is Yukitoshi Kikuchi.

Each of the heroes is aligned to either Tamaki, Shiki, or Setsuna based on their series of origin. Tamaki's faction consists of Dynasty Warriors, Toukiden, Opoona, and Atelier series characters, while Shiki's faction consists of Samurai Warriors, Ninja Gaiden, Haruka: Beyond the Stream of Time and Nioh series characters, and Setsuna's faction consists of Dead or Alive, Deception, Nights of Azure, Rio, and Samurai Cats series characters.

== Development ==
The game was first confirmed with a teaser trailer released on September 13, 2016. Development had started since the previous summer and was originally planned to be a new entry for the Warriors Orochi series, but the developers felt the need to make something different, using several Koei Tecmo titles as base. The game would have a narrower count of characters than the Warriors Orochi series to better flesh out the existing characters; it was later confirmed that the game would have around 30 characters spanning 10 titles. Although the characters who will appear have been finalized, a survey was conducted in the Famitsu magazine for the possibility of expansions through downloadable content. A livestream was conducted in Niconico on December 1, 2016. Initially with a targeted release date of March 2, 2017, the game was later pushed forward to March 30, 2017.

== Reception ==
Reception

Aggregate score
| Aggregator | Score |
|---|---|
| Metacritic | PS4: 70/100 |

Review scores
| Publication | Score |
|---|---|
| Destructoid | 7/10 |
| Famitsu | 35/40 |
| GameSpot | 7/10 |
| Push Square | 5/10 |

The game received positive critical reception, with Famitsu giving the score of 35 for both versions of the game. It sold 40,368 and 17,866 physical retail copies for the PlayStation 4 and PlayStation Vita versions, respectively, during its first week of release.
