= Ninja Gaiden: Dragon Sword =

2008 video game

- North American box art
- Developer: Team Ninja
- Publishers: WW: Tecmo; EU: Ubisoft
- Director: Yosuke Hayashi
- Producer: Yosuke Hayashi
- Designer: Tomonobu Itagaki
- Artist: Yutaka Saito
- Writer: Yutaka Saito
- Composer: Hiroyuki Akiyama
- Series: Ninja Gaiden
- Platform: Nintendo DS
- Release: JP: March 20, 2008; NA: March 25, 2008; AU: June 26, 2008; EU: June 28, 2008
- Genres: Action-adventure, hack and slash
- Mode: Single-player

Ninja Gaiden: Dragon Sword (NINJA GAIDEN DRAGON SWORD(ニンジャガイデン ドラゴンソード), Ninja Gaiden Doragon Sōdo) is a 2008 action-adventure game developed by Team Ninja and published by Tecmo and Ubisoft for the Nintendo DS. A main installment in the Ninja Gaiden series, it features Ryu Hayabusa as the protagonist. The game is the first portable video game title in the series to be developed by Team Ninja and the first game developed by this company to be released for the Nintendo system. Dragon Sword is set between Ninja Gaiden and Ninja Gaiden II.

This title is presented in a third person, pseudo-3D manner, meaning all the game-models are rendered in full 3D, but the world the player travels around in is pre-rendered. When played, the Nintendo DS is held sideways, as in Hotel Dusk: Room 215 and Brain Age: Train Your Brain in Minutes a Day!. The left screen shows the area map, while the right displays the main gameplay, when set for right-handed play, and reverse when set for left-handed play.

Set six months after Ninja Gaiden, Ryu Hayabusa has rebuilt the Hayabusa Village. When fellow villager and kunoichi, Momiji, is kidnapped by the Black Spider Ninja Clan, he is forced to find her, while uncovering the secrets behind the mysterious Dark Dragonstones and their relation to the Dragon Lineage.

== Gameplay ==
Gameplay in Ninja Gaiden: Dragon Sword, showing Momiji (Rin) in a boss fight against Ishtaros

The game's system heavily depends on the stylus, similar to The Legend of Zelda: Phantom Hourglass. For example:

- By tapping the screen, Ryu will use his currently selected projectile.;
- By tapping and holding, Ryu will run to the desired location;
- By drawing a horizontal or vertical line on an enemy, Ryu will do a horizontal or vertical slash with his sword;
- And by sliding up on the screen, Ryu will jump.

Use of Ryu's Ninpo will be activated by tapping an icon on the touch screen. This brings up the outline of a Sanskrit letter to be traced with the stylus.

Like Ninja Gaiden, Ryu can also block attacks by pressing any of the buttons or the directional pad. Evasive rolls can be performed by entering into a blocking stance and tapping the stylus. Although he does not have a multitude of weapons like before, he can still perform his signature Izuna Drop and absorb nearby essences, given off by slain enemies, to unleash powerful attacks, known as Ultimate Techniques. This can be done by sliding the stylus back and forth on Ryu.

A playable demo of the game is downloadable from the DS Download Station Volume 7 and was previously available from the Wii's Nintendo Channel.

== Plot ==
Six months after the events of Ninja Gaiden (chronicled as the Dark Dragon Blade Incident), Ryu Hayabusa has rebuilt the Hayabusa Village. After a training session with the up-and-coming kunoichi, Momiji, she is kidnapped by members of the Black Spider Ninja Clan, on orders from their leader, Obaba, who hopes to obtain the Eye of the Dragon for the ancient Fiend, Ishtaros. As Ryu desperately searches for her, he is suddenly transported back to the monastery in Tairon, capital city of the Holy Vigoor Empire, where he faces hordes of Fiends in the vicinity. After finding a peculiar object, he returns to his village, where master swordsmith, Muramasa, informs him it is a Dark Dragonstone, containing the will and essence of a Dark Dragon. If all eight stones were gathered, it would unleash a power much greater than the Dark Dragon Blade. Muramasa feels confident Ryu will manage to find all eight, thus the young ninja heads to seek out the rest of the stones.

Once Ryu finds seven Dark Dragonstones, the stones lead him to the Black Spider's hideout. There, he finds Obaba, now transformed into a Fiend, and defeats her. The stones reveal a portal down to the Underworld, where Ishtaros awaits the ninja at the Gates of Hell, with an unconscious Momiji as her hostage. The Fiend steals the seven Dragonstones and the eighth is revealed to be in Ishtaros' possession: the jewel embedded into her crown. Ishtaros goes on the offensive, stating since she has control of all eight stones and the Dragon Sword's power is nothing without the Eye of the Dragon, Ryu cannot defeat her. Suddenly, the spirit of the deceased shrine maiden, Kureha, appears and draws out Momiji's spirit. Together, they release the Eye of the Dragon, which fuses with the Dragon Sword, becoming the True Dragon Sword for a second time. Ryu easily defeats Ishtaros, until Nicchae, her twin sister, appears and takes Ishtaros' body and the stones deeper into Hell, to resurrect the Holy Vigoor Emperor.

Unfortunately, the will of the Dark Dragon embedded in the stones is too strong for the Fiends to handle, thus destroying the symbolic Emperor, before it can fully resurrect, and encases Ishtaros in a cocoon. Resigned to her fate that a Dark Dragon will rise again, Nicchae engages Ryu. He mortally wounds her, and as the cocoon absorbs Nicchae, a Dark Dragon bursts out of the shell. Ryu is forced to slay the beast and bring an end to the destruction it could bring. The battle over, Momiji mysteriously appears at Ryu's feet and is unharmed. They return to the Hayabusa Village and after Momiji visits Kureha's grave, promising she will become stronger to better protect herself and the Eye of the Dragon, joins Ryu to continue her training.

== Development ==
Ninja Gaiden series director Tomonobu Itagaki has stated that he decided to make the game for the Nintendo DS because of the originality that the platform allows, which he feels is the most important aspect of a handheld platform, and also to create a challenge for himself. Itagaki also claimed that his children wanted one of his titles on the platform.

One of Itagaki's goals with Ninja Gaiden DS is to create a game that can be played by all gamers everywhere, saying that his other titles "have traditionally targeted men above the age 18 and Westerners." An example of this is that the characters that are traced to perform ninpo magic, were originally kanji; this was changed to the more "culture-neutral" Sanskrit to make things fairer for non-Japanese audiences. Another is the removal of graphic violence common in the Ninja Gaiden prequel series to receive a lower ESRB rating.

The English localization was overseen by Team Ninja member Andrew Szymanski, in collaboration with AltJapan Co., Ltd.

== Reception ==
Reception

Aggregate score
Aggregator	Score
Metacritic	83/100

Review scores
Publication	Score
1Up.com	A−
Destructoid	6.5/10
Eurogamer	7/10
Famitsu	30/40
Game Informer	7.75/10
GameSpot	8.5/10
GameSpy	4/5 stars
GameTrailers	8.8/10
Hardcore Gamer	4.25/5
IGN	8.6/10
Nintendo Life	8/10 stars
Nintendo Power	8.5/10
Nintendo World Report	8/10
Pocket Gamer	3.5/5 stars
411Mania	9/10
Maxim	5/5 stars

The game received "favorable" reviews according to the review aggregation website Metacritic. Reviewers praised the good visuals and intuitive controls, but a common point of criticism was its short length, six to seven hours, and lack of the difficulty compared to previous games in the Ninja Gaiden series. Many video game publications gave it favorable reviews a few weeks before its U.S. release date. In Japan, Famitsu gave is a score of 30 out of 40. GamePro said in its early review, "As a standalone DS game, Ninja Gaiden: Dragon Sword is an amazing adventure almost at the level of [The] Legend of Zelda: Phantom Hourglass. (Note: GamePro gave it 4/5 for fun factor.)

GameZone gave it 8.5 out of 10, calling it "A must-own masterpiece; Tecmo's best since Ninja Gaiden hit the Xbox." GameDaily gave it eight out of ten, calling it "a handheld game that cuts deep." GamesRadar+ gave it a similar score of four stars out of five in an early review, calling it "a short ride, but like any quality roller coaster, it'll rattle your senses and challenge your reflexes. On DS, Dragon Sword has no equal, no fitting comparison, and for that we applaud Team Ninja." Edge gave it seven out of ten, saying, "Team Ninja's finest, most intelligent game since Ninja Gaiden Black, it leaves high hopes for the imminent 360 sequel." However, X-Play gave it three stars out of five in an early review, saying that the game will "leave a vague air of dissatisfaction with Ninja Gaiden vets. It's short, parts of it are sweet, but it never really gets firing on all cylinders, even though the hint of a promise for that level of intensity is present the whole time."

The game was named by IGN as the best Nintendo DS action game of 2008, and for best graphics technology. It was also nominated for best Nintendo DS game and for its best original score. It was also awarded Best Use of Control Scheme by GameSpot in their 2008 Special Achievements video game awards, and nominated for Nintendo DS Game of the Year as well.
