= Ninja Gaiden 4 =

2025 video game

- Developers: Team Ninja; PlatinumGames
- Publisher: Xbox Game Studios
- Directors: Yuji Nakao; Masakazu Hirayama
- Producers: Yuji Nakao; Takayuki Hama
- Designer: Takuma Ishikawa
- Programmer: Naoya Yokoyama
- Artist: Tomoko Nishii
- Writers: Yuji Nakao; Yuya Jin; Yudai Abe
- Composer: Masahiro Miyauchi
- Series: Ninja Gaiden
- Engine: Platinum Engine
- Platforms: PlayStation 5; Windows; Xbox Series X/S
- Release: October 21, 2025
- Genres: Action-adventure, hack and slash
- Mode: Single-player

Ninja Gaiden 4 is a 2025 action-adventure game co-developed by Koei Tecmo's Team Ninja and PlatinumGames, and published by Xbox Game Studios. It is the seventh main game in the Ninja Gaiden series. It follows a new character, Yakumo, though the series protagonist, Ryu Hayabusa, is also playable and has a significant role in the story.

Ninja Gaiden 4 was released for PlayStation 5, Windows, and Xbox Series X/S on October 21, 2025. It received generally positive reviews, with many critics calling it a return to form for the series.

== Overview ==
A gameplay screenshot showing protagonist Yakumo fighting against numerous enemies in a cyberpunk city.

Ninja Gaiden 4 takes place after Ninja Gaiden 3 in a near-future Tokyo, that was plunged into chaos by the return of the Dark Dragon, a malevolent entity behind the Dark Dragon Blade from Ninja Gaiden (2004), and main antagonist of Ninja Gaiden: Dragon Sword (2008). Under the influence of the Underworld, the city takes in a rainy cyberpunk-like aesthetic. According to the director, these unsettling conditions add to the game's core themes and the key concept of "adversity".

A new protagonist, Yakumo, was introduced to make the game approachable to new players. He fights using "Bloodraven Form", a technique that manipulates his blood and blood of the enemies to create powerful weapons that strike down many foes at once. Ryu Hayabusa serves as a "major challenge and growth milestone" for Yakumo, while also being playable throughout the story, utilizing similar moveset and tools to his earlier appearances. Some of the series' signature moves, such as Izuna Drop and Flying Swallow, are available to both characters.

== Plot ==
Some time after the events of Ninja Gaiden 3, Ryu Hayabusa defeated the Dark Dragon, an evil god that was wreaking havoc across the world. However, Ryu was unable to fully destroy the Dark Dragon and its husk remains coiled around the city of Tokyo, drenching the city in cursed rain that causes the land to overlap with the underworld. Tokyo's populace was evacuated and the city has since been quarantined by the Divine Dragon Order, an independent paramilitary force.

A young ninja of the Raven Clan named Yakumo is sent on a mission to assassinate the Dark Dragon's priestess, Seori, in order to fulfill a prophecy to permanently defeat the Dark Dragon as atonement for being its descendants. Yakumo infiltrates a DDO prison facility and confronts Seori, who claims that if she is killed, there will be no way to fully defeat the Dark Dragon as she is the only person who can break the seals imprisoning it. Instead, she claims that if she can break the seals and resurrect the Dark Dragon, she can purify it and make it vulnerable, but only if Yakumo helps her escape the prison. Yakumo reluctantly agrees to team up with Seori and helps her escape.

Several days later, Yakumo enters Tokyo to break the seals at various Dark Dragon shrines scattered around the city, and defeats the various daemons protecting them. However, with each seal that is broken, the Dark Dragon and the daemons grow more powerful. After breaking the second seal, Yakumo is attacked by Ryu and DDO Grand General Kagachi. Ryu quickly gains the upper hand but hesitates when Seori protects Yakumo, being unwilling to harm her. Yakumo then takes the opportunity to escape with Seori. Despite escaping, Yakumo is separated from Seori when she is captured by a fiend. Yakumo pursues the fiend, and with assistance from Ayane, he is able to corner and defeat the fiend, freeing Seori and breaking the third seal.

Yakumo then proceeds to the final shrine, located atop the DDO's headquarters, the Dragon's Maw. He defeats Kagachi and reaches the final seal, where Seori reveals that in order to revive the Dark Dragon, she needs to be sacrificed since her body contains the soul of the Dark Dragon. Yakumo hesitates, only for his ally Misaki to stab Seori, revealing himself to be the great fiend Achilles who originally summoned the Dark Dragon. Angered, Yakumo kills Achilles, but is powerless to stop Seori from dying in his arms as she pleads for him to purify the Dark Dragon. Ryu arrives just in time to witness Seori's death, and recalls the first time he met her.

Several years ago, Ryu rescued Seori from Achilles, who had forced her into summoning the Dark Dragon. After defeating Achilles, Ryu suggested to Seori that she seal away the Dark Dragon, pointing out that the ninja of the Hayabusa Clan do not have the power to destroy it permanently. Only the ninja of the Raven Clan are capable of truly defeating the Dark Dragon, but so far none have come forward to attempt the deed, so their best course of action is to seal the Dark Dragon until such a ninja returns. Ryu helped Seori set up the seals and even captured the fiends she ended up turning into the shrine guardians. With her work done, Seori then turned herself in to the DDO.

Back in the present, Seori had earlier approached Ryu in the Dragon’s Maw and gave him the Dark Dragon Jewel, instructing him to give it to Yakumo if he finds him worthy. Ryu then duels Yakumo to test his skills, and certain that Yakumo is powerful enough, hands the jewel over to him. Using the jewel, Yakumo summons the Dark Dragon Blade, which Ryu explains is capable of purifying the Dark Dragon when wielded by a Raven Clan ninja. Taking the Dark Dragon Blade, Yakumo confronts the Dark Dragon itself and manages to slay it, dispelling the cursed rain from Tokyo and redeeming the Raven Clan's bloodline. With his mission complete, Yakumo fights his way through the DDO blockade to escape Tokyo.

== Development ==
The series developer, Team Ninja, wanted to bring Ninja Gaiden back amidst the growing gap since the last mainline installment and fan requests. As a result of a close relationship between the president of Koei Tecmo, Hisashi Koinuma, and the CEO of PlatinumGames, Atsushi Inaba, the two companies began exploring collaboration possibilities. With the support from Phil Spencer, CEO of Microsoft Gaming, they started work on a brand new Ninja Gaiden title.

Ninja Gaiden 4 was produced by the head of Team Ninja and co-director of Ninja Gaiden 3, Fumihiko Yasuda, and PlatinumGames' Yuji Nakao. Nakao also directed the title together with Team Ninja's Masakazu Hirayama. Xbox Game Studios entered a partnership with Koei Tecmo, the owner of Ninja Gaiden IP, to publish the game worldwide. The company previously released Ninja Gaiden II (2008) for Xbox 360 and worked with PlatinumGames on the cancelled action role-playing game Scalebound. Ninja Gaiden 4 runs on PlatinumGames' proprietary engine, PlatinumEngine, with frame rates as high as 120 FPS.

== Release ==
Ninja Gaiden 4 was announced alongside Ninja Gaiden 2 Black during the Xbox Developer Direct video presentation on January 23, 2025. The game was released for PlayStation 5, Windows, and Xbox Series X/S on October 21, 2025, and was made available at launch on Xbox Game Pass Ultimate and PC Game Pass for Windows and Xbox Series X/S, in addition to supporting Xbox Play Anywhere cross-progression between the aforementioned platforms.

A downloadable content pack titled The Two Masters was released on March 4, 2026. It adds three additional story chapters that take place following the events of the main campaign, a challenge mode named Abyssal Road, as well as additional weapons, stages and enemies.

== Reception ==
Reception

Aggregate scores
| Aggregator | Score |
|---|---|
| Metacritic | (PC) 82/100 (PS5) 79/100 (XSXS) 82/100 |
| OpenCritic | 83% recommend |

Review scores
| Publication | Score |
|---|---|
| Famitsu | 9/10, 9/10, 9/10, 9/10 |
| Game Informer | 8.75/10 |
| GameSpot | 8/10 |
| GamesRadar+ | 5/5 |
| Hardcore Gamer | 3.5/5 |
| IGN | 8/10 |
| PC Gamer (US) | 69/100 |
| Push Square | 7/10 |
| Shacknews | 8/10 |
| Video Games Chronicle | 4/5 |

Ninja Gaiden 4 received "generally favorable" reviews from critics, according to review aggregator website Metacritic. Fellow review aggregator OpenCritic assessed that the game received strong approval, being recommended by 83% of critics. In Japan, four critics from Famitsu gave the game a total score of 36 out of 40, with each critic awarding the game a 9 out of 10.

=== Accolades ===
The game was nominated for Best Action Game at The Game Awards 2025, and for Action Game of the Year at the 29th Annual D.I.C.E. Awards. It won Best Action Game, and was nominated for Surprise of the Year and Game of the Year (Players' Voice) at the Ultra Game Awards 2025.
