= Ryu Hayabusa =

Video game character in the Ninja Gaiden and Dead or Alive series

- Ninja Gaiden and Dead or Alive character
- Ryu Hayabusa in Ninja Gaiden 4 (2025)
- First game: Ninja Gaiden (1988)
- Created by: Hideo Yoshizawa
- Designed by: Masato Kato
- Voiced by: English: Unknown actor (2000); Justin Gross (2004); Josh Keaton (2008); Troy Baker (2011–2014); Dave B. Mitchell (2019); Mike Stoudt (2025); Japanese: Hideyuki Hori (games); Keiichi Nanba (anime)
- Portrayed by: Kane Kosugi

In-universe information
- Fighting style: Hayabusa Ninjutsu
- Origin: Japan
- Nationality: Japanese

Ryu Hayabusa (Japanese: リュウ・ハヤブサ/隼 龍, Hepburn: Hayabusa Ryū) is a fictional character and the protagonist of Koei Tecmo's Ninja Gaiden action game series, debuting in two 1988 video games for the arcade games and the Nintendo Entertainment System. Ryu is a human-dragon hybrid who wields an ancestral weapon called the Dragon Sword, and is the leader of the Hayabusa Ninja Clan. Ryu was created by Hideo Yoshizawa and designed by Masato Kato who wanted to create an action game where the player uses an unique take on the concept of ninja based on how the Western audience saw the concept behind them as superheroes. In 2004, game designer Tomonobu Itagaki created a new Ninja Gaiden where Ryu carries the same characterization but with a more modern appearance in 3D environments. He has also appeared in multiple spin-offs and an original video animation adaptation.

Outside Ninja Gaiden, Ryu has also appeared as a player character in the Dead or Alive fighting game franchise by Koei Tecmo and Team Ninja where he serves as the protagonist in Dead or Alive 2 and one of the staple characters of the series, having appeared in every main series entry. Ryu is featured on official series merchandise as well as in the feature film DOA: Dead or Alive, and has made many crossover appearances in other games.

He has received favorable reception from critics and audiences, and is considered to be one of the most iconic examples of a ninja character in video games as handful of critics have ranked him as the most iconic ninja in gaming. The character received negative response for his weaker traits seen in Ninja Gaiden 3 as well as his lack of screetime in the latest installment, Ninja Gaiden 4, where the new character Yakumo takes the role of protagonist.

== Conception and design ==
Concept art of Ryu by Masato Kato.

According to developer Masato Kato, the term "ninja" was gaining popularity in North America, prompting Tecmo to develop a ninja-related game for the NES at the same time the arcade version of Ninja Gaiden was being developed. Ryu was created by game designer Hideo Yoshizawa who was influenced by multiple Castlevania when creating Ninja Gaiden. The concept of Ryu was " ninja shouldering his own destiny, charging forward in the face of immense evil". Since both arcade and Famicon had a game with the same title, Yoshizawa wanted to make Ryu cooler on the Famicon. Yoshizawa noticed that in the making of the game, ninjas were associated with superheroes. As a result, he wanted to stay away from such concept when creating Ryu. However, creating a ninja game in modern times felt contradictory by Ryu since the idea of the protagonist killing the final boss did not fit the setting.

In designing the protagonist Ryu Hayabusa, the development team wanted him to be unique from other ninjas. They designed him with a ninja vest to place emphasis on his muscles, and they furnished him with a cowl that arched outward. They originally wanted to equip Ryu with sensors and a helmet with an inside monitor to check his surroundings, but that idea was scrapped. According to Kato, they used specific locations and environments to justify the need for having a ninja for a main character. Ryu Hayabusa is equipped with a katana-like Dragon Sword, shurikens, and ninpo techniques such as fire wheels.

=== Inclusion in Dead or Alive ===
During Tecmo's development of the first Dead or Alive fighting game, lead developer Tomonobu Itagaki initially planned to include a male ninja named "Kamui". Another developer proposed they include Ryu instead as it was already a developed character under Tecmo's corporate banner, and Itagaki received permission to include the character from the company's then-CEO. Itagaki however was unfamiliar with what sort of character Ryu was, and in an interview with Famitsu explained to learn more about the character he located and assembled a Ninja Gaiden arcade cabinet from the company's warehouse to play. To illustrate a distinction between Dead or Alive and Ninja Gaiden, the former's development team chose to refer to the character as "Hayabusa" within the games themselves, in contrast to how he is referred to by his first name more in the latter. As later Ninja Gaiden games were released, his outfit from those games was included to better tie the franchises together.

While the development team wanted to add gymnastic attacks to the character in Dead or Alive, the development process made that too difficult at the time, so Itagaki added moves such as a throat cut against opponents to try and "bring out the image of Hayabusa". Additionally he envisioned Ryu as a grappling-type character that used throws, but did not want him to feel too similar to the wrestling move-based character Tina Armstrong. To achieve this he limited the character's throwing attacks so Ryu would feel distinct from the "grappler" archetype in fighting games. Later games in the series focused on his hand motions to help design strikes that felt suited for the characters. Some attacks such as a handstand were removed from later titles as they felt inconsistent with character's portrayal in Ninja Gaiden.

=== Transition to 3D Ninja Gaiden games ===
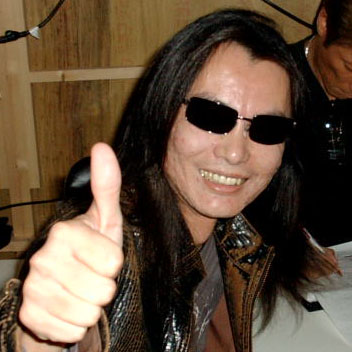
Tomonobu Itagaki was behind Ryu's inclusion in the first 3D Ninja Gaiden and the Dead or Alive fighting games

In 2004, Ryu became the protagonist of a series of Ninja Gaiden games made in 3D. Tomonobu Itagaki believed that creating extra player characters might distract his team from focusing on Ryu's development, despite this, Rachel is a playable character in the Sigma version. Ninja Gaiden provides a backstory to Ryu's appearance and character as seen in the Dead or Alive series, being set two years before the first DOA game. When asked in 2008 if he would ever explore a "stealth aspect" of Ryu in a future series title, Ninja Gaiden: Dragon Sword designer Itagaki replied, "The kind [of ninja] I like are the ones that go out and kill a bunch of enemies all at once." The Nintendo DS-exclusive game was designed to cut enemies stylishly. One of Itagaki's goals with Ninja Gaiden DS is to create a game that can be played by all gamers everywhere, saying that his other titles "have traditionally targeted men above the age 18 and Westerners." An example of this is that the characters that are traced to perform ninpo magic, were originally kanji; this was changed to the more "culture-neutral" Sanskrit to make things fairer for non-Japanese audiences.

Starting with Ninja Gaiden II, the series' graphic violence greatly increases as Ryu is able to defeat opponents by decapitation or dismemberment. In a 2011 interview with PlayStation.blog, Team Ninja head Yosuke Hayashi described the character's development in Ninja Gaiden 3 he wanted to explore the protagonist's sensitive side by showing how murders he has committed affected him even if the narrative takes place in a fantasy world. He commented on the gameplay itself "we have to have the players feel like Ryu is a superhero, the Ryu Hayabusa they know, to make them emphasize with the consequences ... as the game progresses."

For Ninja Gaiden 4, the developers from Platinum Games said that one of the requests they had was keeping Ryu identical which led to few changes. With the handling of the new character Yakumo, Ryu instead comes across a more powered veteran fighter. Developers believed Ryu managed to capture people's ideal type of ninja since the 2D games and that by Ninja Gaiden 4 he is "the pinnacle of what it is to be a ninja".

== Appearances ==
=== Ninja Gaiden series (1988-1992) ===
Ryu Hayabusa makes his official debut in the original 1988 Ninja Gaiden arcade game. He searches for his missing father. Ken had instructed Ryu in a letter beforehand to travel to the United States to find his friend Dr. Walter Smith, but Ryu encounters Bloody Malth, who had defeated Ken in battle and then subjected him to a brainwashing that causes him to attack his own son, a spell that Ryu manages to break. However, Ken is slain by Malth's superior, an evil sorcerer known as the Jaquio, whom Ryu then kills. Ryu later enters into a relationship with CIA agent Irene Lew.

In Ninja Gaiden II: The Dark Sword of Chaos (1990), Ryu foils the Jaquio's demonic master Ashtar's attempt at world domination. In retaliation, Ashtar kidnaps Irene in order to lure Ryu to his home dimension. Ryu defeats Ashtar a second time, but before he can rescue Irene, she is then captured by the Jaquio, who now bears the Dark Sword, the antithesis to Ryu's signature "Dragon Sword" weapon. Having then been killed by Ryu once again, the Jaquio is revived by his blood flowing into his sword, with which he stabs Irene. Her own blood further empowers his sword and conjures a creature known as the Demon; Ryu kills it and Jaquio's Dark Sword is destroyed in the process, but Irene dies from her wounds. She is then brought back to life by ancestral powers flowing through Ryu's Dragon Sword.

1991's Ninja Gaiden III: The Ancient Ship of Doom sees Ryu accused of murdering Irene, but she actually survives the attack, while the culprit is revealed to be a superhuman clone of Ryu, created by Irene's superior and corrupt CIA director, Foster. After Ryu defeats the double, Foster is killed by H.P. Clancy, who had instructed Ryu to locate a ruin called the "Castle Rock Fortress", which was the base of Foster's Bio-Noid experimentation and has also secretly housed an interdimensional warship that Clancy intends to use for global dominance. Ryu kills Clancy in battle.

The 1991 Game Gear version of Ninja Gaiden scraps the entire narrative of the original series timeline, where someone is trying to steal his dragon sword. He travels to four parts of the world to defeat the demon Shiragane and prevent World War III from starting. The 1992 Master System version of Ninja Gaiden also eludes the original series timeline, featuring Ryu as a high-ranking member of his ninja clan whose village is massacred while an artifact called the "Sacred Scroll of Bushido" has been stolen. His mission is to regain the scroll from the hands of the evil Shogun of Darkness and his minions.

=== Ninja Gaiden series (2004-present) ===
In Ninja Gaiden, the Hayabusa Village is annihilated and a sword known as the "Dark Dragon Blade" is stolen by the evil Doku. Ryu searches for the stolen sword while hoping to avenge his clan. He defeats Doku and then his overlord, the Holy Emperor Vigoor, and recovers the blade. In the end, Ryu and his newest accomplice, a fiend-hunter named Rachel, encounter the mysterious "Dark Disciple", who is actually Ryu's traitorous uncle. Following his final fight, Ryu destroys the sword. The plot of 2008's Ninja Gaiden: Dragon Sword has Ryu find seven Dark Dragonstones, defeating several bosses along the way. At the climax, Doku's former servant Ishtaros steals the stones and defeats Ryu in battle. However, when Kureha—Momiji's sister and a childhood friend of Ryu from the previous game who had died in the village attack—fuses with an object called the Dragon Eye, the stones transform into the Dragon Sword. Ryu defeats Ishtaros and her sister, frees Momiji and returns her home where they begin training together.

In Ninja Gaiden II (2008), a CIA agent named Sonia warns Ryu of the Greater Fiends, whose queen, Elizébet, attempts to steal an artifact called the Demon Statue, which is hidden in the Hayabusa ninja village and what she desires in order to resurrect the Archfiend Vazdah. After his village is razed once again and the statue is stolen, Ryu infiltrates a castle where the object is held. Joe is critically wounded in his battle against Black Spider clan leader Genshin, who then attempts multiple times to kill Ryu thereafter but fails and is slain in his final attempt despite Elizébet having transformed him into one of the game's sub-bosses, the Four Greater Fiends. Before he dies, Genshin gives Ryu a sword called the "Blade of the Archfiend". Following the demise of the three other Greater Fiends, Ryu kills Elizébet and Vazdah with both the blade and his own Dragon Sword. At the conclusion, he uses the Archfiend's sword to mark Genshin's gravesite in a cemetery located at the summit of Mount Fuji.

Ryu is summoned by the JSDF in Ninja Gaiden 3 (2012) to assist with the suppression of a terrorist group called the Lords of Alchemy. He pursues the terrorists and their mysterious leader around the world, but realizes he cannot complete his mission without the Dragon Sword. While stalking the group, he also must save a young girl whom he had promised to protect, named Canna. After he succeeds in terminating the group, he destroys another final boss character bent on global destruction and returns the child safely to her mother before disappearing into the shadows.

Ryu's story continues in the 2013 release Yaiba: Ninja Gaiden Z, in which he is not playable; instead, he is pursued by the game's protagonist, Yaiba Kamikaze, in his quest for revenge after having been wounded by Ryu's Dragon Sword. In Ninja Gaiden 4, the veteran Ryu Hayabusa serves as a "major challenge and growth milestone" for the protagonist Yakumo, while also being playable throughout the story.

=== Dead or Alive series ===
Ryu is a player character in the Dead or Alive games, which take place chronologically years after the Ninja Gaiden series. Starting with the 1996 original game, in which he receives an invitation to the inaugural Dead or Alive tournament which he participates in while searching for fellow ninja, Kasumi, after she broke shinobi code and ran away from her village to get revenge on Raidou who crippled her brother, Hayate. Ryu is the primary protagonist in the 1999 sequel Dead or Alive 2 where he wins the second championship upon learning beforehand that an interdimensional creature named Gohyakumine Bankotsubo, escaped the Tengu world and joined the tournament to wreak chaos on the human world.

In Dead or Alive 3 (2001) he faces off against Hayate, who has become the newest leader of the Mugen Tenshin ninja clan, as well as aiding both Hayate and Ayane against the Omega empowered Genra. In Dead or Alive 4 (2005), Ryu joins fellow clansmen and other members of the Mugen Tenshin clan to stop the corruption within DOATEC by assaulting and detonating their "Tritower" headquarters. Ryu returns in 2012's Dead or Alive 5 as he aids Hayate and Ayane in their battle against Donovan's new organization, MIST, who plans to sell modified soldiers to various militia around the world. As Ryu sense the resurrection of Raidou set up by MIST is approaching in Dead or Alive 6, Ryu warns Kasumi about this referred threat, with MIST’s new target to resurrect Raidou as an undead cyber ninja by kidnapping both of his illegitimate daughters, Ayane, and Honoka. He was approached by the princess of the Tengu world Nyotengu, proving his might as a man who ended Bankotsubo’s crime, sparring her and tells her to leave human world, satisfying her as well.

=== Other appearances ===
==== Other video games ====
The 2007 Xbox 360 game Halo 3 features an unlockable "Hayabusa" armor set, while players are awarded an in-game unusable replica of Ryu's Dragon Sword upon reaching a specific gamerscore objective. "Hayabusa Ninja" is an alternative costume for the character Max in 2007's Super Swing Golf: Season 2.

In commemoration of the 2009 merger of Koei and Tecmo, Ryu, Ayane and Momiji were unplayable guest characters in Koei's Dynasty Warriors: Strikeforce released that year. In the company's 2011 hack and slash title Warriors Orochi 3, Ryu, Ayane, Rachel, Momiji and Kasumi appear in another dimension and assist the game's playable characters. Ryu's Ninja Gaiden costume parts were available as exclusive downloads as part of the first-anniversary promotion campaign for Dynasty Warriors Online. Ryu additionally appeared with Ayane in the April 2012 Japan-only release Dynasty Warriors 3DS . Ryu also appeared in Warriors All-Stars. Two side boss characters known as Jin and Ren Hayabusa, based on Ryu’s classic looks appears in Nioh and its followup respectively.

==== Film ====
In the 1991 Japan-exclusive OVA film Ninja Ryūkenden, an original adventure loosely based on the early games, Ryu was voiced by Keiichi Nanba, and he was given a red and purple palette as opposed to his solid blue in the NES series, while he is unmasked. Set in New York City, the plot involves a doctor who has supposedly discovered a cure for cancer. He in turn is investigated by a reporter named Sarah, who soon discovers that he is conducting biotechnological experiments on live humans, which possibly involves the power of the Evil Gods, whom Ryu had defeated in the past. This is compounded by the abduction of Irene, which forces Ryu to become the Dragon Ninja once again and defeat this new enemy and save her. The conclusion has Ryu remaining in America, where he marries Irene and they open an antique shop together.

Ryu is briefly seen in the 2002 film Run Ronnie Run, where the character, Jerry Trellis (portrayed by E.J. De la Pena), is playing on a Dead or Alive 2 arcade cabinet.

Ryu was played by Japanese-American actor Kane Kosugi in the 2006 live-action Dead or Alive film adaptation DOA: Dead or Alive. He serves as the love interest of Kasumi after he informs her of Hayate's supposed death, and his fight scenes consist of him defeating a fighter during the tournament, and later stopping Victor Donovan's hired assassin Bayman from stealing the prize money.

== Cultural impact ==
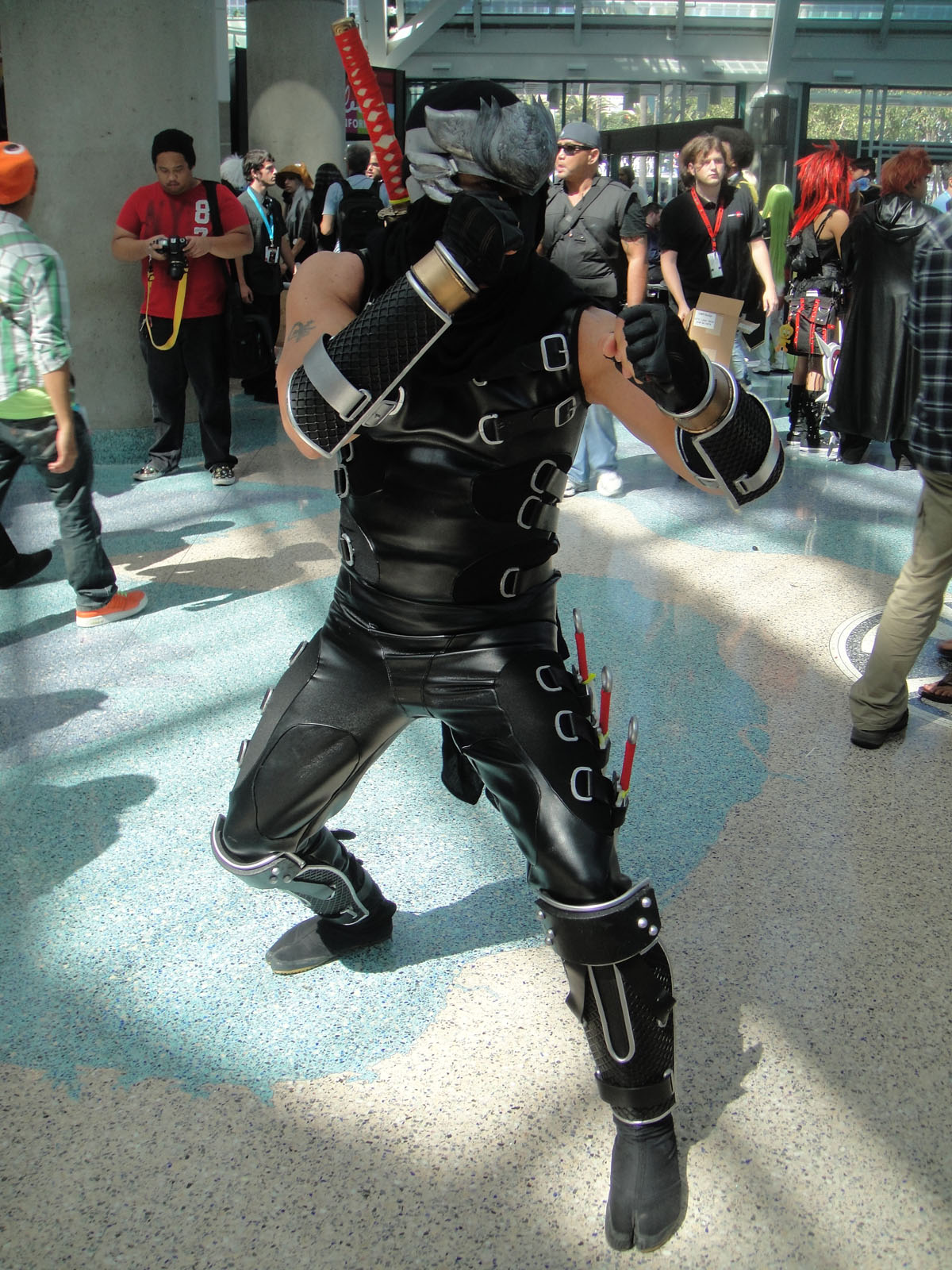
A Ryu Hayabusa cosplayer at Anime Expo 2012

=== Merchandise ===
Merchandising of the character has appealing to EndGadget for its chibi form that contrasts his signature style. Ninja Gaiden II statues of Ryu were released in 2008 by First 4 Figures and NECA. Other action figures based on his Ninja Gaiden incarnations were made available by Kotobukiya in 2005 and One 2 One Collectibles in 2009. A limited-edition figurine of Ryu battling enemy character Regent of the Mask was included along with an art book and soundtrack in the 2012 collector's-edition release of Ninja Gaiden 3. In 2015, a 13" resin statue of Ryu was released by Multiverse Studios, available in variations of either his Ninja Gaiden III or classic series costumes and the base adorned with LED lights.

Ryu has featured on decisively less Dead or Alive merchandise than his female counterparts. Epoch Co. distributed a Japan-exclusive action figure, while Koei Tecmo released a keychain and a three-dimensional poster in 2013 featuring Ryu and the Dead or Alive 5 Plus cast.

=== Critical response ===
Since his 1988 debut, Ryu Hayabusa has been both critically and publicly received as a popular character in general video gaming when it comes Nintendo and Xbox audiences. In "30 years ago, Ninja Gaiden predicted the future of video games", Diamond Feit from Retronauts said that Ryu was originally a silent character sometimes and stood out even in the arcade version thanks to his violent fights. While Ryu did not make the enemies bleed in the original game, gamers were shocked by a violent torture scene which Ryu is a victim by demons. Feit said such violent action was succeeded by the arcade game Tecmo Knights but the writer claimed that original scene left him in shock in retrospect. According to Feit, Ninja Gaiden made him aware of the existence of ninjas which he found cool. David Grossman from Inverse felt that Ryu's original story in the Famicon Ninja Gaiden was similar to a noir story due to how Ryu finds himself in cutscenes and consistently jumps between stages.

The character was popular through how he promoted the first games with his image. Nintendo Power honored the game in its November 2010 issue. The magazine listed its box art, which depicts a ninja with a burning city in the background, as one of its favorite designs in the NES library. The magazine's Editor-in-Chief Chris Slate was equally impressed by the game's box art. IGN said the character had a notable evolution ever since 8-bit generations and he always looked well designed in gameplay and cutscenes. The same site especially regarded one of the latter as one of the best cinematic scenes for starting Ryu's journey after the death of his father. Complex said that Ryu had one of the best stories about revenge in gaming, but also found the twist of his father being a major moment in gaming especially since he turns out to be Ryu's antagonist. Eurogamer said that Ryu Hayabusa became a more notable character thanks to the presentation of the first NES Ninja Gaiden as its cutscenes elaborated more on him like links to a father figure and villains the hero often has to fight. GamesRadar found him as a brutal character despite his heroic portrayal, remaining as one of the "most memorable, influential, and badass" gaming protagonists.

Despite the positive response Ryu's character received in his games, his portrayal in Ninja Gaiden 3 was the subject of criticism by Daily News for being portrayed as a passive fighter compared to his past brutal characterization with his design no longer involving his mask. The writer said Ninja Gaiden 3 features a more sensitive and vulnerable Ryu as a result of killing so many enemies in previous games. The change of personality was compared to Samus Aran from Metroid: Other M which resulted in the protagonist receiving negative backlash for her characterization. Siliconera panned the handling of the protagonist in Ninja Gaiden 3 for being overly guilty over his actions despite spending multiple installments killing enemies, ruining the appeal of the franchise. The Gamer also panned this take of Ryu, calling it "murder hobo" and all of murders Ryu keeps committing make the plot lack any sense. In contrast, Siliconera saw the altered Ryu from the remake Razor's Edge as more violence than in the original Ninja Gaiden 3 which the writer noted to have ended on failure with one of the reasons being the protagonist's personality. GamesRadar praised how Razor's Edge no longer questions the character's moral and instead give the player freedom in regards to what Ryu can do to the enemies at the cost of removing several scenes involving such state of the protagonist. In response to Ninja Gaiden 4, Rock Paper Shot Gun lamented Ryu became a minor character as he is rarely playable in Yakumo's place, making parallels with Raiden from Metal Gear and Nero from Devil May Cry who also happen to be popular action games and replace previous iconic heroes.

After Soulcalibur V was released, Elton Jones of Complex wanted him as guest characters a future series entry; He enjoyed the skills of Taki and Natsu but wanted Ryu to be the focus of the story. Red Bull regarded Dead or Alive as one of the best crossover games ever mainly because the writer favorited Ryu Hayabusa, referring him as the best ninja in fiction, and playing as him was rewarding. Ryu's inclusion in Warrior's Orochi was praised by PlayStation Blog due to how his continuous guest appearances in several games made him an icon in Koei Tecmo.

== See also ==
- Ninja in popular culture
