= List of best-selling Xbox games =

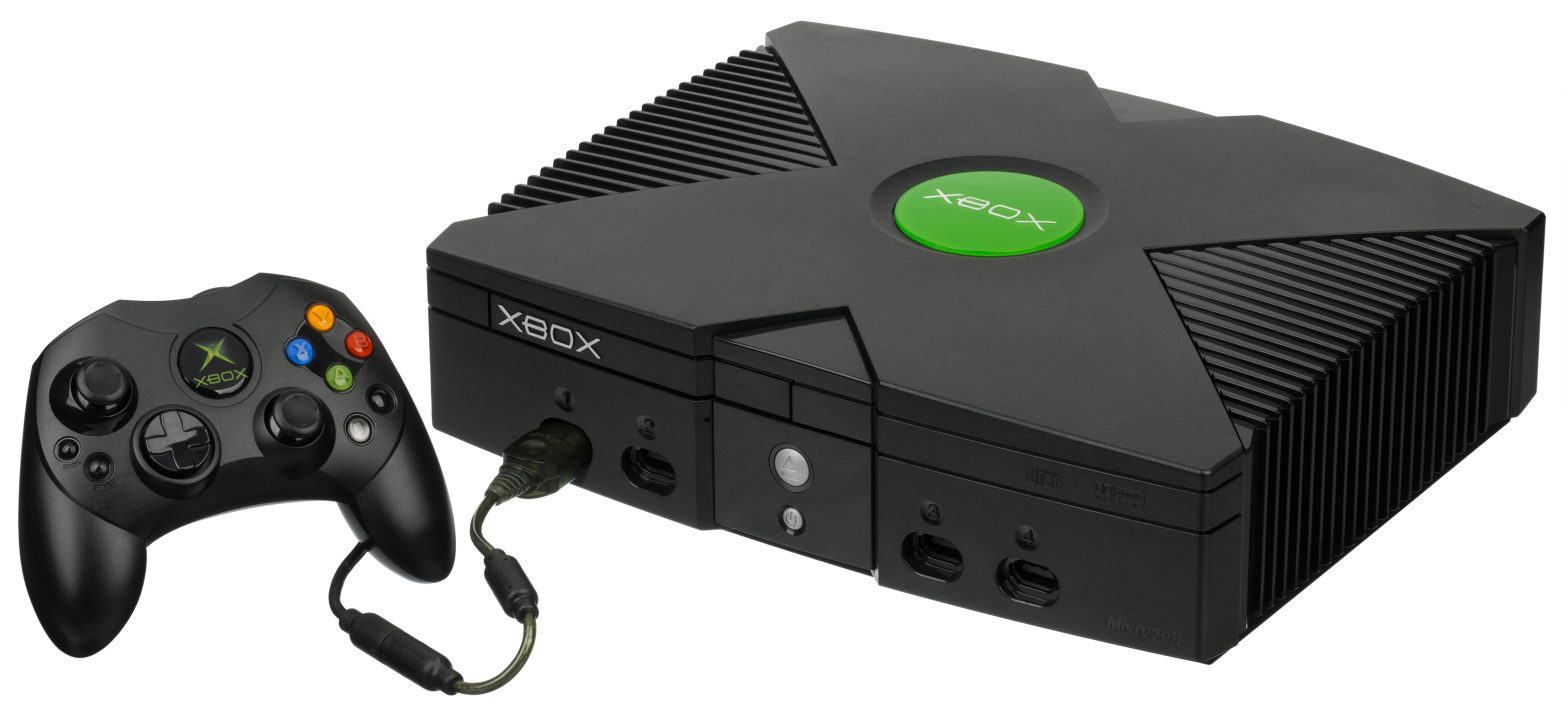
Xbox console with controller

This is a list of video games for the Xbox video game console that have sold or shipped at least one million copies. The best-selling game on the Xbox is Halo 2, first released in the United States on November 9, 2004. It went on to sell over 8.46 million copies worldwide. The first game in the series, Halo: Combat Evolved, was a launch title which ultimately became the second best-selling game, selling over 5 million copies.

== List ==
Game	Copies sold	Release date (Note: Only the initial release date on this platform is listed.)	Genre(s)	Developer(s)	Publisher(s)
Halo 2	8.46 million	November 9, 2004	First-person shooter	Bungie	Microsoft Game Studios
Halo: Combat Evolved	6 million	November 15, 2001	First-person shooter	Bungie	Microsoft Game Studios
Fable	3 million	September 14, 2004	Action role-playing	Big Blue Box Studios	Microsoft Game Studios
Grand Theft Auto: Double Pack	2.49 million	October 21, 2003	Action-adventure	DMA Design (III) Rockstar North (Vice City); Rockstar Vienna	Rockstar Games
Tom Clancy's Splinter Cell	2.4 million	November 17, 2002	Stealth	Ubi Soft Montreal	Ubi Soft
Dead or Alive 3	2 million	November 15, 2001	Fighting	Team Ninja	WW: Tecmo; EU: Microsoft Game Studios
Star Wars: Knights of the Old Republic	1.58 million	July 15, 2003	Role-playing	BioWare	LucasArts
Counter-Strike	1.5 million	November 18, 2003	First-person shooter	Valve	Sierra Studios
Ninja Gaiden	1.5 million	March 2, 2004	Action-adventure; hack and slash	Team Ninja	Tecmo
Grand Theft Auto: San Andreas	1.46 million	October 26, 2004	Action-adventure	Rockstar North	Rockstar Games
Need for Speed: Underground 2	1.44 million	November 15, 2004	Racing	EA Black Box	EA Games
Madden NFL 2005	1.42 million	August 9, 2004	Sports	EA Tiburon	EA Sports
Madden NFL 06	1.41 million	August 8, 2005	Sports	EA Tiburon	EA Sports
Call of Duty 2: Big Red One	1.39 million	November 1, 2005	First-person shooter	Treyarch	Activision
ESPN NFL 2K5	1.38 million	July 20, 2004	Sports	Visual Concepts	Sega
The Elder Scrolls III: Morrowind	1.36 million	June 6, 2002	Role-playing	Bethesda Game Studios	Bethesda Softworks
Star Wars: Battlefront	1.22 million	September 21, 2004	Third-person shooter; first-person shooter	Pandemic Studios	LucasArts
Project Gotham Racing	1.2 million	November 15, 2001	Racing	Bizarre Creations	Microsoft Game Studios
Star Wars: Battlefront II	1.17 million	October 31, 2005	Action; third-person shooter; first-person shooter	Pandemic Studios	LucasArts
Tom Clancy's Ghost Recon	1.13 million	November 11, 2002	Tactical shooter	Red Storm Entertainment	Ubi Soft
Need for Speed: Underground	1.1 million	November 17, 2003	Racing	EA Black Box	EA Games
