= Ninja Gaiden (Game Gear) =

1991 video game

- Japanese cover art
- Developer: Japan System House
- Publisher: Sega
- Composer: Kenji Yamazaki
- Series: Ninja Gaiden
- Platform: Game Gear
- Release: JP: November 1, 1991; NA: December 1991
- Genre: Platform
- Mode: Single-player

Ninja Gaiden (忍者外伝) is a 1991 video game released for the Game Gear by Sega with license from Tecmo. It stars Ryu Hayabusa and is part of the Ninja Gaiden series, although it features a plot not connected to any of the other Ninja Gaiden games. The gameplay is similar to previous Ninja Gaiden games where the player jumps between platforms defeating and avoiding enemies.

== Gameplay ==
Gameplay is in many ways similar to the NES and Master System games with minor differences in mechanics. Jumping is more like moon jumping and the sword slash is quicker and has a wider range. Ryu can also scale walls and edges. There four different secondary weapons. Ryu's "spiritual strength" (called Force) can go up to 99.

== Plot ==
At the start of the game, Ryu Hayabusa is responding to an attack in his village as he rushes to a shrine where the leader of the attack was holed up in. Defeating him, the leader reveals that he was hired by a man named Totenkopf who was a smuggler who sells weapons to a variety of clients. Attempting to find out why someone would steal the Dragon Sword, Ryu infiltrates the boat and kills Totenkopf, revealing a man named Mr. Tsin who he was selling weapons to in Hong Kong. Ryu defeats Mr. Tsin but not without being captured and brought to India where the person who wants the Dragonsword to start World War III reveals himself to be Shiragane, a demon capable of mind control and with the power of the Dragon Sword, can effectively have almost unlimited power in dominating over the minds of others. Ryu kills him and brings an end to another threat of the world.

== Reception ==
Reception

Review scores
Publication	Score
AllGame	3/5
Electronic Gaming Monthly	6/10, 7/10, 7/10, 7/10
Mean Machines	86%
Sega Force	71%
Video Games	67%

By Summer 1992, the game was among the top 10 successful selling Game Gear games at the time. Ninja Gaiden garnered mixed opinions from video game critics. In a review upon its release, a critic for Electronic Gaming Monthly called it a "nice addition to the portables growing list of action carts", but disliked its "awkward" graphical style that looked more like Strider than a Ninja Gaiden release, as well as the gameplay. Eric Mylonas, writing for a 2004 guide of the Ninja Gaiden games by Prima Games, called the Game Gear title a "good, solid, game but it's really Ninja Gaiden in name only." Awarding the game three stars in a retrospective, AllGame journalist Kyle Knight praised its "clean" graphics and "very catchy", fast-tempo music. A primary criticism in his review for the Game Gear release was its difficulty that was significantly decreased from the NES games in the franchise, writing that its little amount of challenge "may be great for some, but utterly ruin it for others." Hardcore Gaming 101 bashed it as a "boring" edition of the NES counterpart, disliking its "loose and hectic" control, "glitchy" visuals and the false "Reprogrammed Game Copyright Sega 199X" text in the title screen even though the game is actually different from the NES version.
