= Ninja Gaiden (arcade game) =

1988 video game

- North American arcade flyer
- Developer: Tecmo (Note: Lynx version developed by BlueSky Software.)
- Publishers: Tecmo: DOS; Hi-Tech Expressions; Amiga, Atari ST, CPC, ZX Spectrum; Ocean Software; Lynx; Atari Corporation
- Director: H. Iijima
- Artist: Shinobu Iwabayashi
- Writer: H. Iijima
- Composers: Mikio Saitou; Ichiro Nakagawa; Ryuichi Nitta; Tamotsu Ebisawa
- Series: Ninja Gaiden
- Platforms: Arcade, Amiga, Amstrad CPC, Atari ST, Commodore 64, MS-DOS, ZX Spectrum, Atari Lynx
- Release: October 1988: Arcade; NA: October 1988; EU: December 1988; JP: February 1989 MS-DOS; NA: 1990; NA: February 15, 1991 (re-release) C64; WW: 1990 Amiga, Atari ST, CPC, ZX Spectrum; EU: 1990 Lynx; NA: May 1991; EU: 1991
- Genre: Beat 'em up
- Modes: Single-player, multiplayer

Ninja Gaiden, released in Japan as Ninja Ryūkenden (忍者龍剣伝; lit. 'Ninja Dragon Sword Legend') and in Europe as Shadow Warriors, is a 1988 beat 'em up game developed and published by Tecmo for arcades. It was first released in North America and Europe in late 1988, and then in Japan in February 1989. It was the first game released in the Ninja Gaiden franchise. The arcade game was a major commercial success in North America, becoming the highest-grossing arcade conversion kit of 1989 in the United States. A significantly different game of the same name for the Nintendo Entertainment System was developed in parallel and released the same year.

== Plot ==
The player controls a ninja hired by the United States government to defeat an evil cult led by Bladedamus, a descendant of Nostradamus who seeks to fulfill his end of the world prophecies. Flooding the streets of the United States with criminals released from Alcatraz, Bladedamus has kidnapped the President and acquired codes for launching the nation's ICBMs.

== Gameplay ==
The game's first stage, with the advertising sign having been damaged

The first player controls a ninja dressed in blue, while the second player controls one dressed in orange. Like most beat-'em-ups, players proceed through stages by defeating enemies scattered through each area.

The controls consist of an eight-way joystick with a button installed on top and two additional action buttons for attacking and jumping. The button on top of the joystick allows the player character to grab onto any overhead bar or tightrope and hang from there. There are five primary techniques performed by pressing the joystick and buttons individually or in combination with each other. These consists of the "Triple Blow Combination" (3段連続攻撃, Sandai Renzoku Kōgeki; a series of punches and kicks that serve as the player's standard attack), the "Flying Neck Throw" (首切り投げ, Kubikiri Nage; performed by attacking the enemy while jumping), the "Hang Kick" (反動蹴り, Handō Keri; performed by attacking the enemy while hanging from a bar), the "Tightrope Walk" (綱渡り術, Tsunawatari Jutsu; in which the player moves while hanging from or standing above a tightrope), and the "Phoenix Backflip" (飛鳥返し, Hichō Gaeshi; a backflip performed after running into a wall), which becomes an attack if the player has a sword.

The player can destroy certain objects in the environment (such as telephone booths, signposts, dumpsters) by knocking or throwing enemies onto them. These will uncover hidden items that will award the player with bonus points, health recovery, time extensions and even an extra life. One particular item will temporarily arm the player with a sword that can be used up to ten times before reverting to his standard punches and kicks.

The first five stages are based on actual American cities and landmarks including Los Angeles, New York City, Las Vegas, North Carolina, the Grand Canyon, and a transcontinental railroad. The sixth and final stage is set inside the enemy's hideout. The recurring bosses include a sumo wrestler, a pair of wrestlers resembling the tag team Road Warriors known as the Daor Warriors (ドーロウォリアーズ), and a trio of claw-wielding masked acrobats known as the Men from Nanto (南斗の男たち, Nanto no Otokotachi). The final boss, Bladedamus, wields two swords and has a fire breath attack.

== Ports ==
The Ninja Gaiden arcade game was produced and released almost simultaneously with its home console counterpart for the Nintendo Entertainment System, although they are different games with only a few similarities. The designer of the arcade game is only credited as "Strong Shima", but Masato Kato, who worked on the NES version, identified him as one "Mr. Iijima".

Home versions of Ninja Gaiden were released under the Shadow Warriors title in 1990 by Ocean Software for five different computer platforms (Amiga, Atari ST, Commodore 64, ZX Spectrum, and Amstrad CPC). The game was published for the IBM PC by Hi-Tech Expressions, and a single-player game for the Atari Lynx had to be programmed from scratch, which was done by BlueSky Software. The arcade version of Ninja Gaiden is also included as a hidden bonus game in Ninja Gaiden Black for the Xbox in 2005.

This game was released on the Wii as a downloadable Virtual Console Arcade game and released in Japan on July 28, 2009, in PAL regions on November 13 and in North America on December 21. Hamster Corporation released the game as part of their Arcade Archives series for the Nintendo Switch and PlayStation 4 in 2019.

== Reception ==
Reception

Review scores
Publication	Score					
Publication	Amiga	Arcade	Atari Lynx	Atari ST	C64	ZX
Crash						74%
Computer and Video Games	93%	Positive	89%			92%
IGN			7/10			
Raze			91%			
Sinclair User						75%
ST Review				4/5		
Your Sinclair						90%
Zzap!64					57%	
Commodore User		8/10				

Awards
Publication	Award
Computer and Video Games	C+VG Hit
Your Sinclair	Megagame

The arcade game was a major commercial success in North America, becoming the highest-grossing arcade conversion kit of 1989 in the United States. In Japan, Game Machine listed Ninja Gaiden on their March 15, 1989 issue as being the second most-successful table arcade unit of the month.

The arcade game was well received by critics. Nick Kelly of Commodore User called it "the next generation for Double Dragon fans" with praise for the controls, background variety and two-player mode, but with some criticism towards the "slightly washed-out" graphics and "gory" continue screen. Computer and Video Games called it a "slick beat 'em up" similar to Bad Dudes vs. Dragon Ninja (1988) with "smooth" graphics and "masses of action" that is "great fun" in two-player mode, despite the lack of originality.

Reviewing the Atari Lynx version, Robert A. Jung with IGN said the story was irrelevant and the game was a scaled down version of the arcade original. He praised the graphics but in his final verdict he wrote that "Ninja Gaiden is not a bad game; it's just not a good game, either." Rob Swan with Computer and Video Games said the game was exactly the same as the arcade coin-op and felt the game was a little short of superb but really addictive. Les Ellis gave the game a positive review in Raze.

Reviewing the Atari ST version, ST Review writes, "One of the better arcade conversions, this is a game that has stood the test of time."

Reviewing the ZX Spectrum version, Your Sinclair praised the colorful graphics and interactive backgrounds. Crash liked the animation, but had grown tired of the genre. Sinclair User summed it up with "there isn't really a speck of originality about Shadow Warriors. Nonetheless, it will be a stiff challenge." Reviewing the Amiga and Spectrum versions, C+VG highlighted the music and sound effects.

== See also ==
- Rygar, another Tecmo game referenced in background graffiti
