= Ninja Gaiden (2004 video game) =

Action-adventure game

- European cover art
- Developer: Team Ninja
- Publishers: WW: Tecmo (Note: PlayStation Vita port released under the Tecmo Koei publishing label. Master Collection port released under the Koei Tecmo publishing label.); EU: Eidos Interactive (PS3)
- Director: Tomonobu Itagaki
- Producer: Tomonobu Itagaki
- Designers: Masanori Sato; Noriaki Kazama; Katsunori Ehara
- Programmer: Takeshi Kawaguchi
- Artist: Kenichiro Nakajo
- Writers: Masato Onishi; Daisuke Suzuki
- Composers: Ryo Koike; Wakana Hara; Makoto Hosoi
- Series: Ninja Gaiden
- Platforms: Xbox, PlayStation 3, PlayStation Vita, Nintendo Switch, PlayStation 4, Windows, Xbox One
- Release: March 2, 2004: Xbox; NA: March 2, 2004; JP: March 11, 2004; EU: May 14, 2004; AU: May 28, 2004 Black Xbox; NA: September 20, 2005; JP: September 29, 2005; EU: October 21, 2005 Sigma PlayStation 3; JP: June 14, 2007; NA: July 3, 2007; EU: July 6, 2007; AU: July 13, 2007 Sigma Plus PlayStation Vita; WW: February 22, 2012; JP: February 23, 2012 Sigma (Master Collection) PS4, Switch, Windows, Xbox One; WW: June 10, 2021
- Genres: Action-adventure, hack and slash
- Mode: Single-player

Ninja Gaiden (Note: Japanese: NINJA GAIDEN(ニンジャ ガイデン), Hepburn: Ninja Gaiden) is a 2004 action-adventure game developed by Team Ninja and published by Tecmo for the Xbox. A reboot of the Ninja Gaiden franchise, players control Ryu Hayabusa, a master ninja, in his quest to recover a stolen sword and avenge the slaughter of his clan. It is set in the same world as Team Ninja's Dead or Alive fighting games.

Tecmo developed Ninja Gaiden for five years, targeting a western audience. The violence created difficulties obtaining content ratings, and it was censored in some regions. Tecmo promoted Ninja Gaiden international online contests using the Xbox Live service. Record-breaking numbers of players competed for places in the live final held at the 2004 Tokyo Game Show.

Ninja Gaiden received acclaim, with praise for its combat, graphics, and difficulty. It sold more than 1.5 million copies and became one of the ten best-selling Xbox games. It sold 362,441 copies in North America in the first month of release; however, Japanese sales were poor.

Team Ninja released two packs of downloadable content, which were incorporated into a reworked version, Ninja Gaiden Black, in 2005. In 2007, Ninja Gaiden was ported to PlayStation 3 as Ninja Gaiden Sigma, with graphical improvement and gameplay changes; this was released on the portable PlayStation Vita as Ninja Gaiden Sigma Plus. Ninja Gaiden was followed by Ninja Gaiden II (2008), Ninja Gaiden 3 (2012) and Ninja Gaiden 4 (2025). Ninja Gaiden Sigma was released for Nintendo Switch, PlayStation 4, Windows, and Xbox One as part of the Ninja Gaiden: Master Collection on June 10, 2021.

== Gameplay ==
Screenshot showing the protagonist, Ryu Hayabusa, fighting Ghuls

Players control the ninja Ryu Hayabusa from a third-person perspective. Ryu starts with basic abilities and weapons that can be upgraded as he progresses, by discovering or buying items. Ryu can perform acrobatic feats such as running along and jumping off walls, swinging from pole to pole, or running across water. The world is made up of several regions, most of which are connected via the city of Tairon, which functions as a hub. Access to these regions are obtained by fighting enemies, finding keys, or solving puzzles, inspired by the mechanics of The Legend of Zelda video games. The player can save the game at dragon busts scattered throughout the levels.

Ryu's movements are directed using the console gamepad. The control system, which comprises the left thumbstick, two attack buttons, and a block button, was described as fluid and responsive, and Ninja Gaiden was regarded as having one of the deeper combat engines among Xbox games at the time, comparing well to the PlayStation 2 action-adventures God of War and Devil May Cry. Unlike the action games Devil May Cry and God of War, Ninja Gaiden does not allow players to halt or change attacks mid-stroke. Eric Williams, the designer of the God of War combat system, said this made Ninja Gaiden harder to master but lets players fight their computer-controlled foes on equal terms.

Ninja Gaiden features a selection of weapons, each with advantages and disadvantages that affect the way the player approaches combat. These include one-handed swords, such as the Dragon Sword and Kitetsu, which grant quick attacks, and a move called the Flying Swallow, which allows Ryu to leap and slash through enemies. In addition these light weapons allow Ryu to smash foes into the ground and perform his signature Izuna Drop—a spinning piledriver. Heavy weapons, such as the Dabilahro and the Unlabored Flawlessness, are slow but cause more damage to opponents. With flails and staves, the player can string together long sequences of attacks. To engage distant foes Ryu can throw shuriken and shoot arrows. In addition to using standard melee techniques, Ryu can employ essences—colored globes of energy that are released on the death of enemies and absorbed into Ryu's body when he comes into proximity with them. Essences have an important role in general gameplay, acting to heal Ryu, restore his magic, or increase his cash. The player can cause Ryu to draw in essences and unleash powerful attacks known as Ultimate Techniques, which deal heavy damage and make Ryu invincible for a short time.

Ryu can use magical spells in the form of ninpo spells. When activated by the player, these make Ryu cast fireballs, ice storms, or bolts of lightning. Functioning in a similar manner to the bombs or grenades of shooter action games, these spells allow Ryu to inflict heavy damage on enemies while potentially avoiding damage himself. Unsatisfied with their programmed visual effects, the director, Tomonobu Itagaki, wanted to deter players from using ninpo, and so awarded bonus points when players cleared stages without them. Ryu can roll to dodge attacks, or stand and block; but certain enemies can break his guard with strong attacks or by grappling him.

== Plot ==
Inspired by the 1980s Ninja Gaiden series for the Nintendo Entertainment System (NES), the 2004 version was originally set in a re-imagined game world based on another Team Ninja creation, the Dead or Alive (DOA) series of fighting games. However, interviews with Tomonobu Itagaki indicate that the Xbox games are standalone prequels to the NES series and that both possibly share a single continuity.

Ninja Gaiden is set in the world of the Dead or Alive series. Located mainly in Japan and the fictional Western Asian nation of the Vigoor Empire, the game draws on Heian period structures for its Japanese locales—a ninja fortress and village set in the mountains. In contrast the Vigoor Empire, with its capital city of Tairon, is a blend of architectural types from around the world. European-style buildings and the monastery in Tairon exhibits Gothic influences with a vaulted hall, pointed arches, and large stained glass windows. A hidden underground level features statues with the heads of cats, walls covered with carvings, hieroglyphics, Aztec pyramid and a labyrinth. This mix of styles was the result of Itagaki's refusal to constrain the creative process.Ninja Gaiden's story spans 16 chapters, each beginning and ending with a cutscene.

=== Characters ===
The main player character is Ryu Hayabusa, the "super ninja". Itagaki believed that creating extra player characters might distract his team from focusing on Ryu's development, despite this, Rachel is a playable character in the Sigma version. Ryu has a long history with Tecmo; he was the star of the 1990s Ninja Gaiden series and has been part of the DOA roster since 1996. His roles in these games played a part in his popularity among fans and the video game industry. Ninja Gaiden provides a backstory to Ryu's appearance and character as seen in the Dead or Alive series, being set two years before the first DOA game.

Rachel is the leading female character and tragic heroine. She and her twin sister, Alma, are afflicted with a blood curse that turns humans into fiends. Believing that there is no cure for their condition, Rachel seeks to kill Alma to redeem her sister's soul. The relationship between the sisters and the Greater Fiend Doku, who cursed them, serves as a plot device, with Rachel occasionally needing to be rescued by Ryu. Although not a player-controlled character in Ninja Gaiden, in a few sections of the Ninja Gaiden Sigma remake she is controllable. Two other characters assist the player. Ayane, a young female ninja and one of the DOA regular cast members, acts as a guide by supplying advice and objectives to the player. Muramasa, a bladesmith, has shops where players can purchase useful items and upgrades for Ryu's weapons. Muramasa also gives quests and relates back-stories and other crucial information; for example, he tells Ryu how he can obtain the item required to upgrade his Dragon Sword to its full potential. Players have the option to customize the appearance of player characters, with selectable costumes for Ryu and hairstyles for Rachel.

Most of the enemies are fiends—humans changed into monsters by their blood curse. Three Greater Fiends lead their lesser brethren against Ryu, playing major roles in the plot: Alma, Rachel's sister, whose story forms a significant element; Doku, Ryu's main antagonist, whose raid on Hayabusa village and theft of the Dark Dragon Blade comprise the main plot thread; and Marbus, lord of the fiend underworld who is responsible for the final set of challenges Ryu faces in the realm of the fiends before encountering the Vigoor Emperor.

=== Backstory ===
Centuries ago, the Dark Dragon Blade was forged from what was believed to be the bones of a dark dragon. It carried an immense power of evil that whoever wielded it would become the devil incarnate. It brought plague and death to the world during the age of ancient myth until it was sealed by those of the Dragon lineage. Its sister blade, the Dragon Sword, which had been used to slay the dark dragons, was handed down from generation to generation in the Hayabusa Ninja Clan, the modern descendants of the Dragon lineage. Its current successor is Ryu Hayabusa.

=== Story ===
Ryu infiltrates the Shadow Clan fortress to visit his uncle, clan leader Murai. During their chat, Ayane delivers news of a raid on the Hayabusa village. Fighting his way back to his village, Ryu encounters Doku, who has killed the Hayabusa shrine maiden Kureha and has taken the Dark Dragon Blade. Ryu is cut down by Doku with the stolen Blade, but he is brought back to life as a "soldier of revenge" by a falcon, the spiritual animal of the Hayabusa clan.

Seeking vengeance for the death of his childhood friend, Ryu learns from Murai that the raiders are from the Vigoor Empire, a mysterious clan that takes refuge in the city of Tairon. Due to its exclusionist foreign policy, Ryu stows away on an airship to reach his destination. In Tairon, Ryu not only battles the Vigoor Empire clan but also monstrous enemies called Fiends and a rival clan called the Black Spider Clan that also seek the Dark Dragon Blade. Eventually, he meets Rachel, a Fiend Hunter who too seeks vengeance on Doku for turning her twin sister Alma into a Greater Fiend. In the background, Ryu is shadowed by Gamov and the Dark Disciple, two mysterious figures with an unknown motive.

Ryu encounters Alma and defeats her in a battle that wrecks the city but leaves her to Rachel's mercy. Conversely, Rachel cannot bring herself to kill her sister, and instead is taken by Doku, who prepares to sacrifice her in a ritual to enhance Alma's power. However, in a strange turn of events, Alma sacrifices herself and rescues Rachel, destroying Doku's spirit in the process. With his dying breath, Doku casts the blood curse on Ryu, which turns his skin blue and eyes red. The only way to lift the curse is to kill the clan's leader, the Holy Vigoor Emperor. While Rachel mourns the death of Alma, Ryu storms the Imperial Palace and faces the Holy Vigoor Emperor in a fiery volcanic pit. Once the Emperor is destroyed, Ryu's curse is lifted and the realm begins to collapse. Ryu seizes the Dark Dragon Blade and ascends to the surface with the help of Rachel but in the process, he loses his grip on the evil Blade.

Outside the Imperial Palace, the Dark Dragon Blade lands at the feet of the Dark Disciple, who takes it and kills Gamov. The Disciple reveals himself to be Murai and admits that the raid on Hayabusa village was part of his plan to restore the Blade's evil power, using souls harvested by Ryu. Drawing on the Blade, Murai transforms into a devil incarnate and attempts to kill his nephew. Ryu defeats Murai and shatters the Blade with the True Dragon Sword. Victorious, Ryu turns himself into a falcon and flies to the Hayabusa village. He places the Dragon Eye, used to enhance his sword, on Kureha's tombstone and disappears into the night.

== Development ==
Development began in 1999 on the Sega NAOMI arcade system board. Tecmo planned to move the project to the Dreamcast, but this was abandoned when Sega discontinued the Dreamcast in 2001. Tecmo decided to release Ninja Gaiden as a launch game for the Sony PlayStation 2 in the US. However, Itagaki was impressed by the Xbox software development kits and pushed for Team Ninja to develop for Xbox. Team Ninja kept silent on this change in direction, and surprised both the games industry and fans when they announced at E3 2002 that Ninja Gaiden would be released exclusively on the Xbox. Most who voted on Tecmo's poll wanted the game on the Nintendo GameCube.

Ninja Gaiden was Team Ninja's first action game. Its initial concept had nothing in common with the original Ninja Gaiden series. However, for retail reasons, Tecmo wanted to retain a link with the previous games, which had many fans in the West, so Itagaki was asked to target the foreign market. Analyzing the earlier games, he concluded that their violence appealed to players, and included gory content, such as beheadings. He also aimed to make his new game hard but alluring; it would challenge players on their reflexes rather than on their memories of layouts and timings. His team made a point of designing smoothly-flowing gameplay with high-quality animations that reacted quickly to input.

Itagaki paid homage to the earlier Ninja Gaiden series by including updated versions of foes and special attacks. For Ninja Gaiden Sigma, Team Ninja modeled the henchman Gamov's two pistols on identifiable real-world handguns, and had an artist study human anatomy closely so that every character's skeletal and muscle structure was accurate. The team hired martial artists to digitally capture their movement. Rather than import the motion captures directly, the animators used them as templates to give a sense of realism to the characters' exaggerated movements. Itagaki found it more interesting to design nonhuman creatures than human enemies.

== Release ==
In Japan, a demo disc of Ninja Gaiden was bundled with the February 26, 2004, issue of Famitsu Xbox. It let players try the first chapter on two difficulty settings with a few fully upgraded weapons and ninpos. On March 2, 2004, a year later than originally planned, Tecmo released Ninja Gaiden in the United States. It was released in Japan on March 11 and in Europe on May 14.

=== Regional censorship ===
As released, Ninja Gaiden contained bloody acts of violence, decapitations and grotesque monsters. The North American games rating body, the Entertainment Software Rating Board (ESRB), rated it as a "Mature" game, which prohibits sale to anyone under the age of 17 in several states. The depiction of beheadings, though, attracts stricter ratings in other parts of the world. In Germany, the Unterhaltungssoftware Selbstkontrolle (USK) deemed these excessive, and refused to rate the game. Since this had the potential to place Ninja Gaiden in Germany's "List of Media Harmful to Young People", which would have meant that shops could neither advertise the game nor sell it unless by request to customers of 18 years or older, Tecmo censored the European PAL version to obtain a USK rating. A year later, Tecmo managed to obtain a USK 18+ rating for the uncensored release of Ninja Gaiden Black.

Japan's Computer Entertainment Rating Organization (CERO) rated Ninja Gaiden and Black, on their release, as 18+ games. At the time, CERO ratings acted as guidelines for consumers. However, on March 1, 2006, the Japanese rating system changed. A scale from A to D was introduced, with an additional Z rating for games with large amounts of gore, violence and crime. The Z rating is legally enforced, it being illegal to sell such games to anyone under the age of 18. As a result, Tecmo removed the human beheadings in Sigma to obtain a D rating for the East Asian market. However, CERO reclassified the two previous games as D, despite them also depicting human decapitations.

=== Post-release ===
Team Ninja kept working on the Ninja Gaiden project after its release, with the aim of pushing the action genre and their first such game as far as they could. To this end, they released downloadable expansions, known as Hurricane Packs, free of charge. Itagaki said that since the packs were born out of his team's interest, they did not care to charge players for their efforts. The two packs were available over Xbox Live in the third quarter of 2004.

- Hurricane Pack 1 was a revamped version of Story Mode; Team Ninja tweaked the encounters and artificial intelligence (AI) of Ryu's foes to increase the difficulty. The pack introduced additional foes such as humanoid cats, giants wearing dinosaur skulls, and cyborgs, and Team Ninja made a key change to the camera system by which the on-screen action is displayed; players could now control the camera and change its viewing angle. Another feature of the pack was to enhance the combat engine; the new "Intercept" skill let players counter any enemy attack with the proper timing.
- Hurricane Pack 2 kept the enhancements of the first but took place in an alternative world comprising only two regions, where players have to fight through several encounters to rescue Rachel from two new bosses (Nicchae and Ishtaros). This expansion introduced fiends who wield giant swords and cast fireballs.

Team Ninja later compiled both expansion packs, and added new features, to create Ninja Gaiden Black. This game, which Itagaki viewed as the final version of Ninja Gaiden, went on sale on September 20, 2005. A few years later, Team Ninja upgraded the graphics and ported it to the PlayStation 3 (PS3). This version was released as Ninja Gaiden Sigma on June 14, 2007. Black became an Xbox Original game on February 11, 2008.

=== Online competition ===
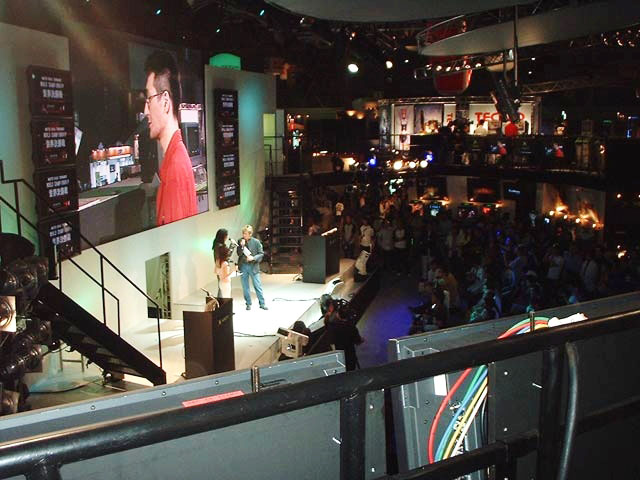
The contest's World Championship at the TGS 2004. Finalists played on walkways above the crowd while commentators talked about their actions on the big screen.

The Master Ninja Tournaments were a series of three online contests held by Microsoft and Tecmo in 2004. They took place over Xbox Live, and were open to participants in Europe, Japan, and North America. Winner selection was based on the scores achieved through playing Ninja Gaiden or its Hurricane Packs. Players had 14 to 24 days to complete the required games and submit their scores to an online scoreboard.

The first two tournaments formed regional qualification stages for a live Ninja Gaiden Master Tournament World Championship, held on September 25 at the TGS 2004. Competition for places was intense, with both tournaments breaking records for online participation in Xbox Live events. Six of the highest scoring players from Europe and North America won bokkens bearing Itagaki's signature, and five regional winners were selected to proceed to the final. Here, the finalists simultaneously played a custom game drawn from Hurricane Pack 2 while commentators called out the action. They had 15 minutes to complete the game and post the highest score; the winner emerged only in the last 20 seconds, when Yasunori Otsuka cleared the game and outscored his rivals. At the award ceremony, the finalists received their prize plaques from Itagaki.

The tournaments were not without controversy. Players complained about Microsoft's tardiness in posting the official rules for the first playoff, and it was believed that the top posted score was not achievable by fair means. Officials, however, stated that the score was possible, and allowed the results to stand. In the second playoff, Microsoft initially named the runner up as the North American finalist, after disqualifying the winner for no publicly stated reason, but eventually had to send the second runner up to Tokyo when the first was unable to produce a passport in time.

Master Ninja Tournament 3 started on September 27 and lasted 26 days. Rankings were decided by scores obtained while playing Hurricane Pack 2, and the prizes were Tecmo apparel and Team Ninja games. This marked the end of official tournaments for Ninja Gaiden, although Microsoft has retained the ranking boards for players to upload their scores.

=== Merchandise ===
Tecmo has built up a line of merchandise around the Ninja Gaiden name. Its online shop carries apparel and accessories such as caps, wristbands, T-shirts, key holders, and mugs. Most of the merchandise is based on that associated with the various Ninja Gaiden game launches or given as prizes in the Master Ninja Tournaments. Tecmo also published the original soundtrack under their record label Wake Up on March 20, 2004. Kotobukiya, a figurine maker, includes 1/6 scale plastic figurines of Ninja Gaiden characters in their range of products. As of 2007, they have produced figures of Ryu, Ayane, Kureha and Rachel.

== Other versions ==
Tecmo published two additional versions of Ninja Gaiden: Ninja Gaiden Black for Xbox and Ninja Gaiden Sigma for PlayStation 3. Essentially the same game as the original, they tell the same story of Ryu and the Dark Dragon Blade but include additional content and updated game mechanics. Although Itagaki deemed Black to be the final version of Ninja Gaiden, Tecmo ported it to the PlayStation 3 as Sigma.

In addition to the narrative Story Mode, Black and Sigma introduced a gameplay variation called Mission Mode. Focused on action rather than character development, this provides combat-based missions set mainly in small areas, where the player's goal is to "destroy all enemies". In both Story and Mission modes, game scoring is based on the player's speed in clearing encounters, the number of kills achieved, the number of unused ninpo spells remaining at the end, and the amount of cash collected. Players can compare their scores on online ranking boards.

=== Ninja Gaiden Black ===
Tecmo announced at E3 2005 that Team Ninja was working on Ninja Gaiden Black, and later exhibited a working version at the TGS 2005. Black is a reworked compilation of the original Ninja Gaiden and the two Hurricane Packs. It features new foes, such as exploding bats and doppelgänger fiends who can imitate Ryu. It contains more costumes than the original, and swaps Ninja Gaiden's unlockable NES games for an arcade version.

One key feature of this version is its two new difficulty settings—the easy Ninja Dog and the very hard Master Ninja. Itagaki added Ninja Dog after receiving complaints of Ninja Gaiden being too hard in its default incarnation, although he believed that, with persistence, any player was capable of completing it. Hence he ensured that those players selecting Ninja Dog would be subjected to gentle mockery—players on this difficulty setting receive colored ribbons as accessories, and Ayane treats Ryu as an inferior. In compensation, Itagaki made the other difficulty settings harder than in Ninja Gaiden. Another feature of Black is its Mission Mode, which comprises 50 combat missions, one of which is adapted from the custom game designed for the Ninja Gaiden Master Tournament World Championship final. The last five missions are based on those in Hurricane Pack 2 and form a linked series known as "Eternal Legend". While most of the improvements made in the Hurricane Packs carried forward through this game, including the camera system tweaks and new boss battles, the Intercept maneuver, introduced in Hurricane Pack 1, was not included in Black, adding to its increased challenge.

Ninja Gaiden Black was also available through Xbox's Game Pass for Xbox One, but was removed in September 2019. Ninja Gaiden Black is also enhanced for the Xbox One X console, which improves the resolution to 4K UHD-levels.

=== Ninja Gaiden Sigma ===
In 2006, Tecmo and Sony announced the development of Ninja Gaiden Sigma for the PlayStation 3. Eidos obtained the European publishing rights for this game. Itagaki had no direct role in Sigma and judged it a flawed game, although he acknowledged that Sigma gave PlayStation owners a taste of Ninja Gaiden.

The gameplay for Sigma is very similar to the original version, albeit with some modifications. Like the original version, the player's movements and combat system are directed using the console gamepad, which comprises the left thumbstick, two attack buttons, and a block button. Ryu has a selection of weapons, each with advantages and disadvantages that affect the way the player approaches combat. A new addition to Ryu's arsenal is a pair of dual-wield swords, Dragon's Claw and Tiger's Fang. It also provides Ryu with magical spells in the form of ninpo, which allows him to inflict heavy damage on enemies while potentially avoiding damage himself. By shaking the Sixaxis controller, players are able to increase the power of their ninpo spells. Rachel, a non-playable character in the 2004 game, became playable in three new chapters, featuring the new bosses, Gamov and Alterator. Some of the design elements of the old levels was also changed and several new enemy types were introduced.

In addition to the narrative Story Mode, Sigma included a gameplay variation called Mission Mode. Focused on action rather than character development, this provides combat-based missions set mainly in small areas. In both Story and Mission modes, game scoring is based on the player's speed in clearing encounters, the number of kills achieved, the number of unused ninpos remaining at the end, and the amount of cash collected. Players can compare their scores on online ranking boards. In addition, players have the option to customize the appearance of player characters, with selectable costumes for Ryu and hairstyles for Rachel.

The more powerful hardware of the PlayStation 3 gave Team Ninja the opportunity to overhaul the graphics to use larger and more detailed textures. Changes were made to the world, with a few new areas and several additional save points and shops, and alterations to the engine let players shoot arrows in mid-air, fight on water surfaces, and play as Rachel in some chapters and missions.

In July 2007, Tecmo released a demo and a new game mode, Survival Mode, for Sigma over the PlayStation Network. The demo limits players to the first chapter, but lets them play as Rachel in a separate mission. Survival Mode comprises missions in which players keep fighting until they have either killed all their opponents, or their character has been defeated.

=== Ninja Gaiden Sigma Plus ===
Ninja Gaiden Sigma Plus is a port of Ninja Gaiden Sigma for the PlayStation Vita released in North America and Europe on February 22, 2012. Like Ninja Gaiden Black's "Ninja Dog" mode, Sigma Plus features an easier difficulty called "Hero" mode, making it more accessible to casual gamers. It also takes advantage of the additional features that the Vita offers, including gyroscopic first-person aiming (by tilting the PlayStation Vita, the player can adjust the camera angle in first-person viewing modes), back touchpad controls (tapping symbols using the rear touchpad will allow Ryu to boost the power of his Ninpo), touch screen controls (players can go into first-person mode by tapping the touch screen). In addition, Ninja Gaiden Sigma Plus offers new sets of accessories that Ryu and Rachel can equip.

== Reception ==
Reception

Aggregate scores
Aggregator	Score		
Aggregator	PS Vita	PS3	Xbox
GameRankings	N/A	87%	93% (Black) 95%
Metacritic	72/100	88/100	91/100 (Black) 94/100

Review scores
Publication	Score		
Publication	PS Vita	PS3	Xbox
1Up.com	N/A	A	A (Black) A+
Eurogamer	N/A	7/10	9/10
GamePro	N/A	4.75	5/5 (Black) 5/5
GameSpot	N/A	9.0/10	9.4/10 (Black) 9.4/10
IGN	N/A	9.3/10 (US); 8.8/10 (AU)	9.4/10 (Black) 9.4/10
VideoGamer.com	N/A	8/10	9/10

Awards
Publication	Award
IGN	Best Xbox Action Game 2004; Best Xbox Downloadable Content 2004 (Black) Best Xbox Action game 2005
X-Play	Best Action/Adventure Game 2004
EGM	Xbox Game of the Year 2004
GameSpot	(Black) Best Xbox game 2005
TeamXbox	(Black) Best Xbox Action Game 2005

Ninja Gaiden was released to acclaim. Greg Kasavin of GameSpot called it "one of the best most challenging action adventure games ever made", and GameSpot named it the best Xbox game of February 2004. IGN's Erik Brudvig said that it "sets a new standard for third-person action games in terms of length, depth, speed, and gore", while Electronic Gaming Monthly (EGM) called it "an unmissable instant classic", and declared that "no Xbox should go without [Ninja] Gaiden." Critics also regarded it to be one of the most difficult games released prior to 2007. The game received a runner-up position in GameSpot's 2004 "Best Action Adventure Game" category across all platforms.

Ninja Gaiden Black also impressed reviewers. GameSpot noted that it had the best visual and audio presentation on the Xbox and praised its new Mission Mode for "[distilling] the game down to its purest essentials". IGN called its release "a rare and welcome day", which brought their "excitement levels back to the first time [they] played the game".

Consumers purchased over 1.5 million copies of Ninja Gaiden and Black by August 2007, with the bulk of these sales going to North America and Europe. According to the NPD Group, in its first month Ninja Gaiden sold 362,441 copies in the United States. By August 2006, Ninja Gaiden had sold 550,000 copies and earned $27 million in that country. Between January 2000 and August 2006, it was the 100th-highest-selling game launched for the PlayStation 2, Xbox or GameCube consoles in the United States. Combined sales of Ninja Gaiden and Black reached 800,000 units in the United States by August 2006. These sales figures reflect Tecmo's decision to target the non-Japanese market. Japanese gamers were not particularly excited—according to Itagaki, only 60,000 copies of Ninja Gaiden were sold in Japan in the four months following its release. The critical and commercial success of Ninja Gaiden have led CNET and GameSpot Asia to induct it into their halls of fame.

Ninja Gaiden Sigma sold 46,307 units in the first week of its release in Japan, making it the third highest selling game during that period. According to the NPD Group, in its first month Sigma sold 63,637 copies in the United States. Next Generation reported that as of April 2008, 470,000 copies of Sigma have been sold in Europe and North America. Tecmo announced that they have sold 500,000 units worldwide.

Like Ninja Gaiden and Ninja Gaiden Black, Ninja Gaiden Sigma has received positive reviews, currently holding an average score of 87% at GameRankings and 88/100 at Metacritic, based on 58 and 46 reviews respectively. Critics varied in their views on the technical aspects of Ninja Gaiden Sigma. Although the gaming site 1UP.com called the updated graphics "a gorgeous reworking of the modern ninja classic," Pro-G said that they were average by next-generation standards and showed occasional "tearing, jagged edges, and mismatched collision between bloodstains and walls."

== Legacy ==
The Ninja Gaiden games gained a reputation throughout the gaming community for their difficulty and attention to detail. Although they appealed to gamers who, like Pro-G's Struan Robertson, wanted a "bloody hard, but also bloody good" challenge, it was feared that casual gamers would find the learning curve daunting. IGN warned that gamers with lesser skills might not "get as much out of this game as others due to [its] incredible difficulty", and Edge commented that "Tecmo's refusal to extend any kind of handhold to less dedicated players is simply a failure of design, not a badge of hardcore honour", and "it's impossible to believe they couldn't have found a way to increase the accessibility of the game without undermining the gloriously intractable nature of the challenges it contains." EGM found the challenge to be rewarding as it "motivates you to actually get better at the game." Clive Thompson focused on Ninja Gaiden in his Slate article examining the motivation for playing difficult games. He contends that extreme levels of challenge can be initially very frustrating and may cause a game to be abandoned in disgust. However, where a game also rewards a player's perseverance by teaching the skills required to overcome its challenges, that player will have the motivation to finish the game. Ninja Gaiden, to him, strikes the correct balance between challenge and reward; completion brings "a sort of exhausted exhilaration, like finally reaching the end of War and Peace." In 2012, CraveOnline included it on their list of five "badass ninja games", calling it "the pinnacle of action gaming at the time, holding onto that crown for an entire year until God of War released in 2005" and "a true video game classic, and maybe the best ninja game of all time." That same year, G4tv ranked it as the 83rd top video game of all time, also calling it "the best ninja game ever made and one of the all-around hardest."

From a technical point of view, critics regarded Ninja Gaiden and Black as the best of the available Xbox software at the time; the console hardware had been pushed to its limits without showing significant drops in performance. GameSpot's Kasavin was impressed with their "first-rate presentation" and said that no other games at that time came close in visuals and audio. According to IGN, the games could "make [them] momentarily forget about the next generation of consoles". Both Ninja Gaiden and Black were top-sellers, which led to them being compatible with the Xbox 360 for all regions on the new platform's release. Ninja Gaiden attracted criticism for the way on-screen action is framed by the camera. The default camera system centers the action on Ryu and his surroundings, but reviewers were frustrated by occasions when the camera locked on to part of the scenery, thus losing track of Ryu. Tecmo attempted to address this with the introduction of manual camera controls in the Hurricane Packs, and most critics judged that either the camera frame was usually acceptable, or that Ninja Gaiden was a good enough game that its flaws could be overlooked.
