= Wakana Yamazaki =

Japanese actress and voice actress (1965–2026)

- 山崎和佳奈
- Born: March 21, 1965; Yokohama, Kanagawa Prefecture, Japan
- Died: April 18, 2026 (aged 61)
- Education: Doshisha University
- Occupations: Actress; voice actress
- Years active: 1991–2026
- Agent: Aoni Production
- Notable work: Detective Conan as Ran Mouri; Marmalade Boy as Meiko Akizuki; Dead or Alive as Ayane; Digimon Adventure 02 as Arukenimon
- Height: 153 cm (5 ft 0 in)

Wakana Yamazaki (Japanese: 山崎 和佳奈, Hepburn: Yamazaki Wakana; March 21, 1965 – April 18, 2026) was a Japanese actress, voice actress and narrator who worked for Aoni Production.

== Life and career ==
Yamazaki was born in Yokohama on March 21, 1965. She was best known for her roles as Ran Mouri in Detective Conan, Atsuko "Akko" Kagami in the 1998 version of Himitsu no Akko-chan, Maria and Shoryuuki in Ghost Sweeper Mikami, Azumi Kojou in Azumi Mamma Mia, Meiko Akizuki in Marmalade Boy, Ayane in Dead or Alive and Ikuko Tsukino, replacing the late Yūko Mizutani in Sailor Moon Cosmos. Yamazaki also took over the role of Nami for episodes 70–78 of One Piece while regular voice actress Akemi Okamura was on maternity leave, and also voiced Nojiko, Nami's sister. On February 16, 2026, it was announced that Yamazaki would be taking a hiatus while undergoing medical treatment, and Okamura would take on the role of Ran Mouri in Detective Conan.

Yamazaki died on April 18, 2026, at the age of 61.

== Filmography ==
=== Main later roles ===
Year	Title	Roles	Series
1996–2026	Detective Conan	Ran Mouri	Main: TV, OVA, Special, Movie & Video Game / Crossover: Lupin III vs. Detective Conan, Magic Kaito 1412
1996–2026	Dead or Alive	Ayane	Appearance on Ninja Gaiden (from 2004 to 2024) & Xtreme Beach Volleyball series, Fatal Frame: Maiden of Black Water (crossover).

=== TV series animation ===
Year	Title	Roles	Notes
1991	Kinkyū Hasshin Saver Kids	Ran Tenjinbayashi	
1991	High School Mystery: Gakuen Nanafushigi	Kiyomi Sasahara	
1991–1992	Crayon Shin Chan	Crane	SS4 Vol 02
1991–1992	Genji Tsūshin Agedama	Hitomi Kirara	
1991–1992	Dragon Quest: The Adventure of Dai	Soara	
1991–1999	Ghost Sweeper Mikami	Maria, Shoryuki	
1992	Mama wa Shougaku Yonensei	Chigusa Takahashi	
1993	Miracle Girls	Marie	
1993–1994	Sailor Moon R	Kōan	
1992	Chibi Maruko-chan	Haruko	
1994–1995	Chō Kuse ni Narisō	Michiru	
1994–1995	Captain Tsubasa J	Maki Akamine	
1994–1995	Mobile Fighter G Gundam	Bunny Higgins	
1994–1995	Montana Jones	Ariel	
1994–1995	Marmalade Boy	Meiko Akizuki	
1995–1996	Sailor Moon SuperS	Sister Maria, Noriko	
1995	Gulliver Boy	Phoebe	
1995–1996	Neighborhood Story	Mai Ota	
1996–1997	Sailor Moon Sailor Stars	Queen Nehellenia (child)	
1996–1997	Dragon Ball GT	Bisshu	
1996	GeGeGe no Kitaro	Hone-Onna/Bone-Woman (4th Season), Akiko Kataoka (5th Season)	
1997–2000	The Kindaichi Case Files	Izumi Emon	Special Edition
1998	Trigun	Monica	
1998	All Purpose Cultural Cat Girl Nuku Nuku	Chieko	
1998–1999	Himitsu no Akko-chan	Atsuko "Akko" Kagami	3rd series
1998	Yu-Gi-Oh!	Risa Kageyama	
1998–1999	Gasaraki	Ishtar Pilot	
1999–2026	One Piece	Nojiko, Nami (70–78), Scarlett	Voice acted as a substitute for episodes 70–78 as Nami
1999	Ebichu	Yoshiko	Ep. 16
1999	Koume-chan ga Iku!	Koume	
1999	Pokémon	Chisato	
1999–2000	Kamikaze Kaito Jeanne	Sazanka, Myst	
2000–2001	Digimon Adventure 02	Arukenimon	Adventure 02
2001–2002	Shaman King	Gekkō	
2002	InuYasha	Suzuna	
2002	Sheep	Jun-chan	
2002–2003	The Twelve Kingdoms	Kyo-o	
2003–2004	Godannar	Shukuyu	
2003–2005	Bobobo-bo Bo-bobo	Suzu	
2003–2006	Zatch Bell!	Hana Takamine	
2004	Area 88	Taeko Yasuda	
2004–2005	Doki Doki School Hours	Rio Kitagawa	
2004	Fighting Beauty Wulong	Ran Mao	
2005	Loveless	Misaki Aoyagi	
2005	Fushigiboshi no Futago Hime	Narlo	
2005	Xenosaga: The Animation	Shelley Godwin, Pellegri	
2006	Air Gear	Benkei	
2006	Kamisama Kazoku	Ai's Mother	
2009	Lupin the 3rd vs. Detective Conan	Ran Mouri	Crossover TV Special
2013	Saint Seiya Omega	Holy Sword Gallia	
2010–2011	HeartCatch PreCure!	Aki Horiuchi	
2011–2012	Last Exile	Sophia Forrester	Last Exile: Fam The Silver Wing
2014–2015	Magic Kaito 1412	Ran Mouri	
2016	Puzzle & Dragons X	Eldora	
2017	Samurai Warriors	Nene	
2020	Interspecies Reviewers	Lilim B	S1, E4
2022	Digimon Ghost Game	Arukenimon	E 21 Spider's Lure

=== Detective Conan film series ===
Year	Title	Roles
1997	Detective Conan: The Time-Bombed Skyscraper	Ran Mouri
1998	Detective Conan: The Fourteenth Target	Ran Mouri
1999	Detective Conan: The Last Wizard of the Century	Ran Mouri
2000	Detective Conan: Captured in Her Eyes	Ran Mouri
2001	Detective Conan: Countdown to Heaven	Ran Mouri
2002	Detective Conan: The Phantom of Baker Street	Ran Mouri
2003	Detective Conan: Crossroad in the Ancient Capital	Ran Mouri
2004	Detective Conan: Magician of the Silver Sky	Ran Mouri
2005	Detective Conan: Strategy Above the Depths	Ran Mouri
2006	Detective Conan: The Private Eyes' Requiem	Ran Mouri
2007	Detective Conan: Jolly Roger in the Deep Azure	Ran Mouri
2008	Detective Conan: Full Score of Fear	Ran Mouri
2009	Detective Conan: The Raven Chaser	Ran Mouri
2010	Detective Conan: The Lost Ship in the Sky	Ran Mouri
2011	Detective Conan: Quarter of Silence	Ran Mouri
2012	Detective Conan: The Eleventh Striker	Ran Mouri
2013	Detective Conan: Private Eye in the Distant Sea	Ran Mouri
2014	Detective Conan: Dimensional Sniper	Ran Mouri
2015	Detective Conan: Sunflowers of Inferno	Ran Mouri
2016	Detective Conan: The Darkest Nightmare	Ran Mouri
2017	Detective Conan: Crimson Love Letter	Ran Mouri
2018	Detective Conan: Zero the Enforcer	Ran Mouri
2019	Detective Conan: The Fist of Blue Sapphire	Ran Mouri
2021	Detective Conan: The Scarlet Bullet	Ran Mouri
2022	Detective Conan: The Bride of Halloween	Ran Mouri
2023	Detective Conan: Black Iron Submarine	Ran Mouri
2024	Detective Conan: The Million-dollar Pentagram	Ran Mouri
2025	Detective Conan: One-Eyed Flashback	Ran Mouri
2026	Detective Conan: Fallen Angel of the Highway	Ran Mouri

=== Crossover film ===
Year	Title	Roles
2013	Lupin the 3rd vs. Detective Conan: The Movie	Ran Mouri

=== OVA ===
Year	Title	Roles
1992	All Purpose Cultural Cat Girl Nuku Nuku	Maria
1992	Dragon Slayer: The Legend of Heroes	Sonia
1993	Desert Rose	Linda
1994	Shonan Junai Gumi	Natsumi
1999	Aoyama Gōshō Tanpen-shū	Asuka Anzai, Asami Ashikawa, Kaoru
2003	Mermaid Saga	Sawa Kannagi
2004	Interlude	Yuuki Takase

=== Unknown year ===
Year	Title	Roles	Notes
1993	Nintama Rantaro	Bijo, Girl	
1988	Kiteretsu Daihyakka	Satsuki Hanamaru, Reiko, Sakiko, Ruriko	

=== Film animation ===
Year	Title	Roles	Notes
1994	Ghost Sweeper Mikami	Maria	
1995	Marmalade Boy	Meiko Akizuki	
2009	Evangelion: 2.0 You Can (Not) Advance	Operator	
2013	Lupin the 3rd vs. Detective Conan: The Movie	Ran Mouri	Crossover
2023	Pretty Guardian Sailor Moon Cosmos The Movie	Ikuko Tsukino	2-Part Film, Season 5 of Sailor Moon Crystal (Shadow Galactica arc); Replacing the late Yūko Mizutani

=== Video games ===
Year	Title	Roles	Notes
1994	Super Real Mahjong PV	Aya Fujiwara	
1995	Makeruna! Makendō 2	Makenro	
1996	Dead or Alive	Ayane	
1996	Sotsugyou Crossworld (Graduation Crossworld)	Megumi Yokoyama	
1996	Battle Arena Toshinden 3	Rachael	
1996	Star Ocean	Iria Silvestoli, Perisie	
1996	Puyo Puyo	Harpy	PC Version
1998	Abalaburn	Baal, Mary	
1998	Ojyousama Express	Midori Kitakami	
1998	Black Matrix	Puraha	
1998	Mitsumete Knight	Pico, Noel	
1998	Twinbee RPG	Salyut	
1999	Valkyrie Profile	Mystina	
1999	Dead or Alive 2	Ayane	
2000	Never 7: The End of Infinity	Saki Asakura	
2001	Dead or Alive 3	Ayane	
2003	Dead or Alive Xtreme Beach Volleyball	Ayane	
2003	Gekitō Pro Yakyū	Yuki Mizuhara	
2004	Detective Conan: Legacy of the Great Empire	Ran Mouri	PS2 Ver.
2004	Ninja Gaiden	Ayane	
2004	Interlude	Yuuki Takase	
2004–2026	Samurai Warriors	Okuni, Nene	
2005	Dead or Alive 4	Ayane	
2005	Hot Shots Golf: Open Tee	Mai	
2005	Ace Combat 5	Kei Nagase	
2006	Dead or Alive Xtreme 2	Ayane	
2007–2026	Warriors Orochi	Okuni, Nene, Ayane	Ayane appeared Warriors Orochi 3
2007	Detective Conan: Tsuioku no Mirajiyu	Ran Mouri	Released in Japan/Euro only
2008	Ninja Gaiden II	Ayane	
2009	Ninja Gaiden Sigma 2	Ayane	
2010	Dead or Alive: Paradise	Ayane	
2011	Dead or Alive: Dimensions	Ayane	
2011	Warriors Orochi 3	Ayane	
2012	Ninja Gaiden 3	Ayane	
2012	Ninja Gaiden 3: Razor's Edge	Ayane	
2012	Dead or Alive 5	Ayane	
2013	Detective Conan: Marionette Symphony	Ran Mouri	3DS Ver.
2015	Chaos Heroes Online	Sheryl	Released PC ver. Japanese Dubbed
2014	Fatal Frame: Maiden of Black Water	Ayane	
2016	Dead or Alive Xtreme 3	Ayane	
2017	Senran Kagura: Peach Beach Splash	Ayane	DLC Character
2017	Warriors All-Stars	Ayane	
2019	Dead or Alive 6	Ayane	
2022	Digimon Survive	Arukenimon	
2025	Goddess of Victory: Nikke	Jien	
2025	Ninja Gaiden 4	Ayane	

=== Drama CDs ===
Year	Title	Roles	Notes
	Gaki no Ryoubun		Kayanoke no Okite
	Fushigi Yugi	Yui Hongo	

=== Live action voices ===
Year	Title	Roles
1996–1997	B-Fighter Kabuto	Mother Melzard/Jadow Mothera
1997–1998	Ultraman Dyna	Churasa (Alien Gigaru) (Actor: Michelle Gazepis)

=== Radio ===
Year	Title	Roles
	Doki Doki School Hours	Kitagawa
