= Janice Kawaye =

American voice actress (born 1970)

- Born: Janice Hiromi Kawaye; April 4, 1970 (age 56); Los Angeles, California, U.S.
- Other name: Janice Roman Roku
- Education: Los Angeles County High School for the Arts
- Occupation: Voice actress
- Years active: 1983–present
- Agent: CESD
- Notable work: Captain Planet and the Planeteers as Gi; My Life as a Teenage Robot as Jenny "XJ-9" Wakeman; Hi Hi Puffy AmiYumi as Ami Onuki; Class of 3000 as Kim and Kam; Fire Emblem as Lysithea

Janice Hiromi Kawaye (born April 4, 1970) is an American voice actress known for her roles as Gi in Captain Planet and the Planeteers, Jenny "XJ-9" Wakeman in My Life as a Teenage Robot, Ami Onuki in Hi Hi Puffy AmiYumi, and Kim and Kam in Class of 3000.

== Early life ==
Kawaye was born in Los Angeles, California to Hiroko and Harry Kawaye, who was a veteran of the Military Intelligence Service serving five years with the United States Armed Forces. They were both of Japanese descent. She is fluent in Japanese.

== Filmography ==
=== Animation ===
List of voice performances in animation
Year	Title	Role	Notes	Source
1989	The Karate Kid	Taki Tamurai		
1990	Midnight Patrol: Adventures in the Dream Zone	Keiko		
1990–96	Captain Planet and the Planeteers	Gi		
1994–95	Bump in the Night	Little/Big Robot, Little Robot's Sister/Big Robot's Sister, Yellow Bunny		
1995	Where on Earth Is Carmen Sandiego?	Aileen	Episode: "Curses, Foiled Again"	
1996	Quack Pack	Soo Ling	Episode: "Feats of Clay"	
1999	Oh Yeah! Cartoons	Jenny "XJ-9" Wakeman	Episode: "My Neighbor was a Teenage Robot"	
2001–06	Invader Zim	Sara, Child (I), Bad Actress, Autographic ID		
2003–08	All Grown Up!	Kid #2, Kioko, Julia, Serena		
2003–09	My Life as a Teenage Robot	Jenny "XJ-9" Wakeman		
2004–05	Megas XLR	Car Fan 1, Teenage Girl, DanceStation Girl, Galaxia		
2004–08	Codename: Kids Next Door	Sonya (Numbuh 83), Lee (Numbuh 84)		
2004–06	Hi Hi Puffy AmiYumi	Ami Onuki, Tekirai, Gummi Bear, Amibot, Crowd, News Woman, Dogs, Chickens, Girls, Boys, Janice, Skiers, Li'l Ami, Opera Lady, Dupilcats, Slam-I-Yumi, Cheerleaders, Evil Ami		
2006–08	Class of 3000	Kim and Kam Chin		
2012	Doc McStuffins	Kiko		
2013	Young Justice	Asami "Sam" Koizumi, Assistant	2 episodes	
2017	Be Cool, Scooby-Doo!	Aki, Japanese Reporter		
2018	Treehouse Detectives	Owl #2, Fergus, Poppy		
2019–20	YooHoo to the Rescue	Joy, Rustee's Mom, Zebra		
2020	Over the Moon	Pink Lunette		

=== Anime ===
List of voice performances in anime
Year	Title	Role	Notes	Source
2004	Duel Masters	Mimi Tasogare	Season 1	
2006–14	Bleach	Yuzu Kurosaki		
2007–08	Blood+	Chen, Mui, Remy (ep 4), School Girl (ep 8)		
2008	Bleach: Memories of Nobody	Yuzu Kurosaki	Film	
2009	Bleach: The DiamondDust Rebellion	Yuzu Kurosaki	Film	
2012	Bleach: Hell Verse	Yuzu Kurosaki	Film	
2012	Marvel Anime: Blade	Alice (Ep. 8), Danas (Ep. 5), Yati (Ep. 6)		
2014	Gargantia on the Verdurous Planet	Melty; Pilot (ep 1)	Credited as Janice Roman Roku	
2016	Love Live! School Idol Project	Cocoa Yazawa	Credited as Janice Roman Roku	
2017–18	Hunter × Hunter	Shizuku	2011 series Credited as Janice Roman Roku	
2017–19	March Comes In like a Lion	Ayumu Kōda, Mikako Kawamoto		
2017	K: Missing Kings	Kukuri Yukizome	Season 2, Replaced Carrie Savage	
2018	Kabaneri of the Iron Fortress	Mumei		
2019–21	The Promised Neverland	Dominic, Christie		
2019	Kabaneri of the Iron Fortress: The Battle of Unato	Mumei, Ichinoshin		
2019	JoJo's Bizarre Adventure: Golden Wind	Schoolgirl, Young Giorno, Boys	Credited as Janice Roman Roku	
2021	The Hidden Dungeon Only I Can Enter	Olivia Servant		
2021	Re:Zero -Starting Life in Another World-	Garfiel (Young)		
2021	Yashahime	Shiori (Ep. 20)		
2021	Edens Zero	Couchpo		
2022	Case Closed: Zero's Tea Time	Azusa Enomoto		
2022	Case Closed: The Fist of Blue Sapphire	Ayumi Yoshida	Credited as Janice Roman Roku, Film	
2023	Case Closed: The Scarlet Bullet	Ayumi Yoshida	Film	
2025	Bleach: Thousand-Year Blood War	Yuzu Kurosaki	Episode: "The Visible Answer"	

=== Film ===
List of voice performances in direct-to-video and television films
Year	Title	Role	Notes	Source
1987	Dorothy Meets Ozma of Oz	Dorothy Gale	As Hiromi Kawaye	
1988	Pound Puppies and the Legend of Big Paw	Tammy		
2006	Teen Titans: Trouble in Tokyo	Nya-Nya, Timoko		
2006	Codename: Kids Next Door - Operation Z.E.R.O.	Numbuh 83 / Sonja, Numbuh 84 / Lee		

=== Video games ===
List of voice performances in video games
Year	Title	Role	Notes	Source
2004	Ninja Gaiden	Ayane	Also in Ninja Gaiden Black, Ninja Gaiden Sigma & Sigma Plus	
2007	Nicktoons: Attack of the Toybots	Jenny "XJ-9" Wakeman		
2008	Ninja Gaiden II	Ayane	Also in Ninja Gaiden Sigma 2, Sigma 2 Plus, & Ninja Gaiden Black II.	
2010	Valkyria Chronicles II	Cosette Coalhearth		
2012	Ninja Gaiden 3	Ayane	Also in Ninja Gaiden 3: Razor's Edge	
2013	Rune Factory 4	Xiao Pai	Also Special	
2017	.hack//G.U. Last Recode	Kusabira		
2018	Detective Pikachu	Rita Partridge	Credited as Janice Roman Roku	
2018	Naruto to Boruto: Shinobi Strike	Female Avatar 2		
2019	Fire Emblem: Three Houses	Lysithea		
2020	Fire Emblem Heroes	Lysithea	Credited as Janice Roman Roku	
2021	Scarlet Nexus	Additional voices	Credited as Janice Roman Roku	
2022	Fire Emblem Warriors: Three Hopes	Lysithea	Credited as Janice Roman Roku	
2022	Nickelodeon All-Star Brawl	Jenny "XJ-9" Wakeman		
2022	Nickelodeon Kart Racers 3: Slime Speedway	Jenny "XJ-9" Wakeman		
2023	Master Detective Archives: Rain Code	Ama-Pal		
2023	Nickelodeon All-Star Brawl 2	Jenny "XJ-9" Wakeman		
2025	Nicktoons & The Dice of Destiny	Jenny "XJ-9" Wakeman		

=== Live action ===
List of acting performances in film and television
Year	Title	Role	Notes	Source
1984	Night of the Comet	Sarah		

=== Anime ===
- Heroes: Legend of the Battle Disks - Additional Voices
- K: Return of Kings - Kukuri Yukizome (Credited as Janice Roman Roku)
- March Comes In Like a Lion - Ayumu Kouda; SFX Voice (Credited as Janice Roman Roku)
- Toradora! - Yuriko Mitsui; Additional Voices (Credited as Janice Roman Roku)
- The Promised Neverland - Eugene (Credited as Janice Roman Roku)

=== Film ===
- Bleach - Karin, Yuzu
- Hunter × Hunter: Phantom Rouge - Kukuri Yukizome (Credited as Janice Roman Roku)
- Lalaloopsy Girls: Welcome to L.A.L.A. Prep School - Bea Spells-A-Lot (Credited as Janice Roman Roku)
- Love Live! The School Idol Movie - Cocoa Yazawa (Credited as Janice Roman Roku)

=== Video games ===
- Danganronpa 2×2 - Peko Pekoyama
- Final Fantasy XIII-2
