= Case Closed: The Fist of Blue Sapphire =

- Theatrical release poster
- Kanji: 名探偵コナン 紺青の拳(フィスト)
- Revised Hepburn: Meitantei Konan: Konjō no Fisuto
- Directed by: Chika Nagaoka
- Written by: Takahiro Okura
- Based on: Case Closed by Gosho Aoyama
- Starring: Minami Takayama; Kappei Yamaguchi; Rikiya Koyama; Wakana Yamazaki; Naoko Matsui; Nobuyuki Hiyama; Megumi Hayashibara; Kenichi Ogata; Yūki Kaji; Ikusaburo Yamazaki; Mayuko Kawakita; Jeff Manning; Yū Asakawa; Hiroki Takahashi
- Music by: Katsuo Ono (Soundtrack), Hiroomi Tosaka (Theme Song: "BLUE SAPPHIRE")
- Production company: TMS/V1 Studio
- Distributed by: Toho Company, Ltd.
- Release date: April 12, 2019
- Running time: 109 minutes
- Country: Japan
- Languages: Japanese; English
- Box office: ¥9.31 billion (Japan); $123 million (worldwide)

Case Closed: The Fist of Blue Sapphire, known as Detective Conan: The Fist of Blue Sapphire (名探偵コナン 紺青の拳(フィスト), Meitantei Konan: Konjō no Fisuto) in Japan, is a 2019 Japanese animated mystery film. It is the twenty-third installment of the Case Closed film series based on the manga series of the same name by Gosho Aoyama, following the 2018 film Case Closed: Zero the Enforcer. The film was released on 12 April 2019.

This was the last Heisei-era Case Closed film, released weeks before the 2019 Japanese imperial transition. The setting of the film takes place in Singapore, most notably surrounding the Marina Bay Sands.

The film was the 4th highest-grossing Case Closed films in Japan with mixed to positive reviews. Critics praised its visual effects, direction, and characters but criticized its plot and screenplay. It was the second highest-grossing Case Closed film with a worldwide box-office gross of $123 million.

== Premise ==
The world's largest blue sapphire, the 'Blue Sapphire Fist', is said to have sunk when a pirate ship sank in the late 19th century off the coast of Singapore. A local millionaire plots to recover it, and when it reappears at a Singaporean hotel exhibit, a murder takes place and a calling card of Kaitō Kid is found at the scene.

Still in Singapore, Makoto was in the midst of participating in a martial arts tournament where he is joined by Ran and Sonoko to encourage him. Conan is stuck in Japan as he does not possess a passport. However, Kaitō Kid wants to use him to get the sapphire and kidnaps him to take him to the city-state. There, Conan must obey him if he wants to return to Japan; he has his glasses, wristwatch and clothes confiscated, among other things, and must conceal his real identity.

Ran, who does not recognize him, asks him his name and Conan improvises the name of "Arthur Hirai". Disguised as Shinichi Kudo, Kaitō Kid finally manages to get information about the sapphire that is kept in the underground vault of a mansion. During his intrusion into the premises, he is trapped and comes face to face with Makoto.

Leon Lowe, a detective and behavioural psychologist from Singapore, is also searching for the legendary secret treasure buried in the seabed and is in rivalry with Conan and Kid.

== Cast ==
Character	Original Japanese actor	English dubbing actor
Kaito Kid	Kappei Yamaguchi	Griffin Burns
Conan Edogawa / Arthur Hirai	Minami Takayama	Wendee Lee
Ran Mori	Wakana Yamazaki	Cristina Vee
Kogoro Mori	Rikiya Koyama	Xander Mobus
Shinichi Kudo	Kappei Yamaguchi	Griffin Burns
Ai Haibara	Megumi Hayashibara	Erica Mendez
Ayumi Yoshida	Yukiko Iwai	Janice Kawaye
Mitsuhiko Tsuburaya	Ikue Ōtani	Erika Harlacher
Genta Kojima	Wataru Takagi	Andrew Russel
Hiroshi Agasa	Kenichi Ogata	Michael Sorich
Sonoko Suzuki	Naoko Matsui	Minx Le
Makoto Kyogoku	Nobuyuki Hiyama	Christian LaMonte
Ginzo Nakamori	Kōji Ishii	Kirk Thornton
Leon Lowe	Ikusaburo Yamazaki	Kevin M. Connolly
Rechel Cheong	Mayuko Kawakita	Mela Lee
Hezli Jamaluddin	Ryan Drees	Josh Tomar
Zhon Han Chen	Jeff Manning	Stephen Mendel
Sherilyn Tan	Yū Asakawa	Megan Hollingshead
Reijiro Nakatomi	Hiroki Takahashi	Matthew David Rudd
Mark Aidan	Charles Glover	Brook Chalmers
Rishi Ramanathan	Yūki Kaji and Dominic Allen (English Stunt)	Khoi Dao
Eugene Lim	Kurt Common	Kaiji Tang

== Box office ==
In Japan, the film sold 313,724 tickets and earned ¥422,465,000 on its opening day. The film topped the Japanese box office and grossed ¥1.88 billion in its opening weekend, setting a new franchise record. The film remained at the top in its second weekend, selling 678,000 tickets and earning ¥886 million, for a two-week total of ¥3.58 billion ($32.62 million) at the box office. It dropped to number two in its third week, dethroned by newly released Avengers: Endgame, before Detective Conan regained the top spot in its fourth week, beating Avengers: Endgame and the new release Detective Pikachu.

In its fifth week, Detective Conan was dethroned by Detective Pikachu at the Japanese box office. In five weeks, The Fist of Blue Sapphire grossed ¥7,951,036,700 ($72.26 million) in Japan. By its seventh weekend, the film had sold 6.71 million tickets and grossed ¥8,575,715,400 ($78.25 million) in Japan. As of 21 June 2019, it had sold 7.4 million tickets and exceeded ¥9 billion at the Japanese box office. As of 7 July 2019, the film has grossed ¥9.1 billion ($82,915,718) domestically, making it one of the top 50 highest-grossing films ever in Japan. The Fist of Blue Sapphire became the highest-grossing Detective Conan film, surpassing Zero the Enforcer.

Overseas, the film debuted at number two in China, behind only domestic Chinese film Jade Dynasty. The Fist of Blue Sapphire has since grossed $32.4 million in China, as of 22 September 2019. In other territories, the film has grossed $1,728,708 in South Korea and Vietnam, and $65,812 in the United Arab Emirates.

== Release ==
An English dub, produced by Bang Zoom! Entertainment, was released digitally by TMS Entertainment. Discotek Media has licensed the film for home video.

== Reception ==
Ni Nyoman Wira, in The Jakarta Post, wrote "Though it sometimes feels there is too little screen-time for Conan, the movie balances it out, especially toward the end."

== Film setting ==
The film is set mostly in Singapore, with some scenes at the beginning taking place in Tokyo. The film centerpiece setting is a well-known Singaporean landmark — the Marina Bay Sands.

The film also showcases other aspects of Singapore, including Singapore Airlines, Maxwell Food Centre and Suntec City's "Fountain Of Wealth".

== Notes and references ==
Plot retrieved from here
