= University of Mobile =

Baptist university in Mobile, Alabama, US

- Former name: Mobile College (1961–1993)
- Motto: Higher Education for a Higher Purpose
- Type: Private university
- Established: 1961; 65 years ago
- Religious affiliation: Alabama Baptist State Board of Missions
- Endowment: $86,000,000
- President: Charles W. Smith Jr.
- Faculty: 100
- Administrative staff: 100
- Students: 2,092
- Location: Prichard, Alabama, United States; 30.793325°N 88.128789°W
- Campus: Suburban
- Colors: Garnet, Black & Gray
- Nickname: Rams
- Sporting affiliations: NAIA – SSAC
- Mascot: Mac the Ram
- Website: umobile.edu

The University of Mobile is a private Christian university in Prichard, Alabama, United States. It is affiliated with the Alabama Baptist State Convention, which founded the institution in 1961 as Mobile College in reference to its location in Mobile County. It was renamed The University of Mobile in 1993.

The university is organized into six schools and colleges and enrolls approximately 2,100 students. Its athletic teams, known as the Rams, compete in the National Association of Intercollegiate Athletics (NAIA) as members of the Southern States Athletic Conference (SSAC).

== History ==
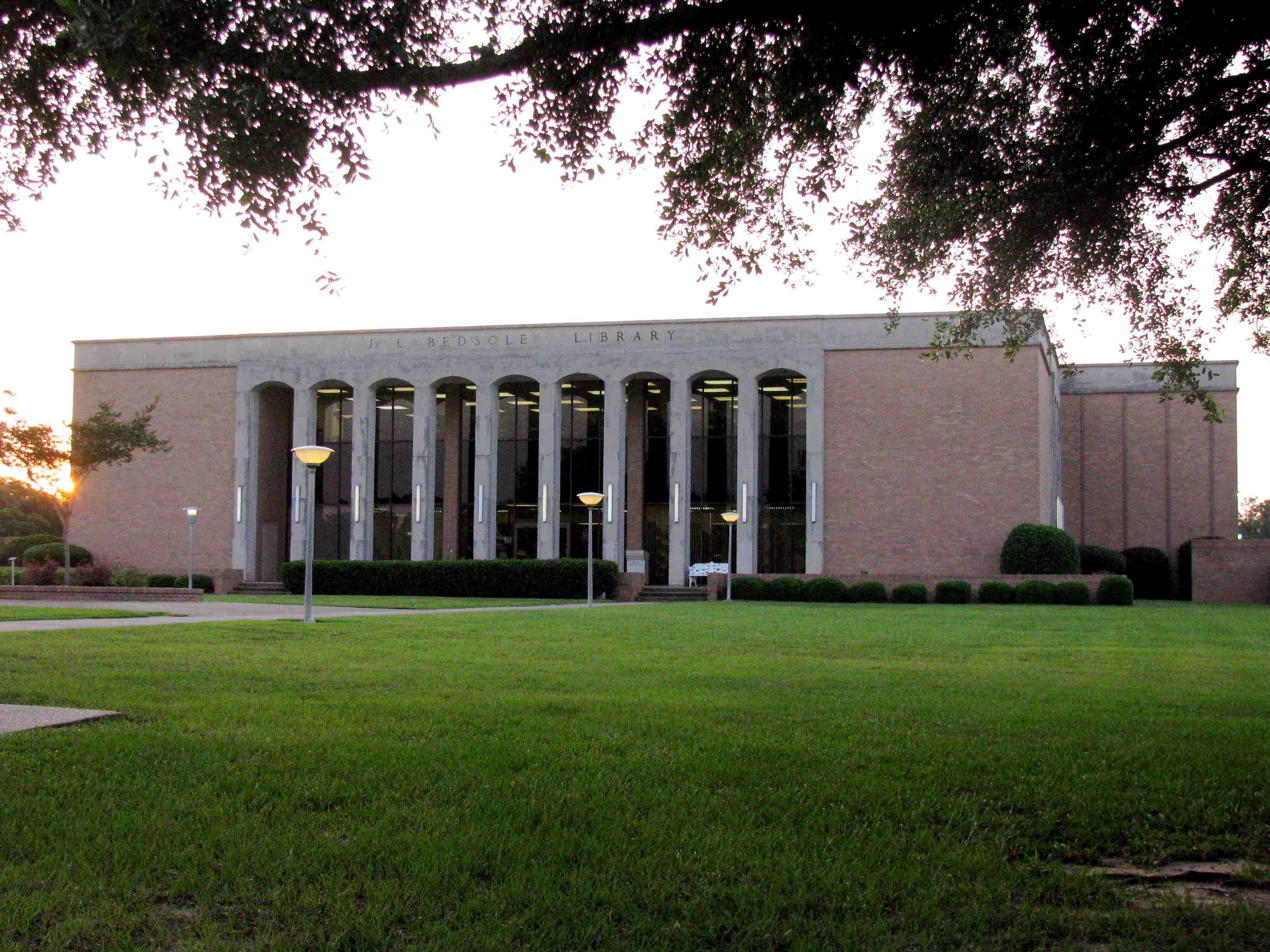
Bedsole Library

The university was founded in 1961 by the Alabama Baptist State Convention under the name of Mobile College in reference to its location in Mobile County, not to be confused with the City of Mobile. In 1993, the college was renamed University of Mobile. For the 2018–2019 year, it had 1,885 students.

== Organization ==
The University of Mobile is governed by a board of trustees. Members are recommended by the president of the university, reviewed by the Committee on Boards at the Alabama Baptist State Convention, and appointed by the Alabama Baptist State Convention. Elected trustees serve 4-year terms with reelection possible up to a maximum of 12 continuous years, after which an individual must be off the board for at least one year before becoming eligible to return. Life trustees must have held an elected position on the board for 20 years and may then be presented by the president for election to the life position. As of April 2008, the university had 33 elected trustees and four life trustees.

== Academics ==
- Alabama School of the Arts
- College of Arts and Sciences
- Celia Wallace College of Health Professions
- Grace Pilot School of Business
- School of Education
- School of Christian Studies

The University of Mobile has also established engineering partnership programs with Auburn University and the University of South Alabama by which students may receive a bachelor's degree from the University of Mobile and a bachelor's degree in engineering from the participating university.

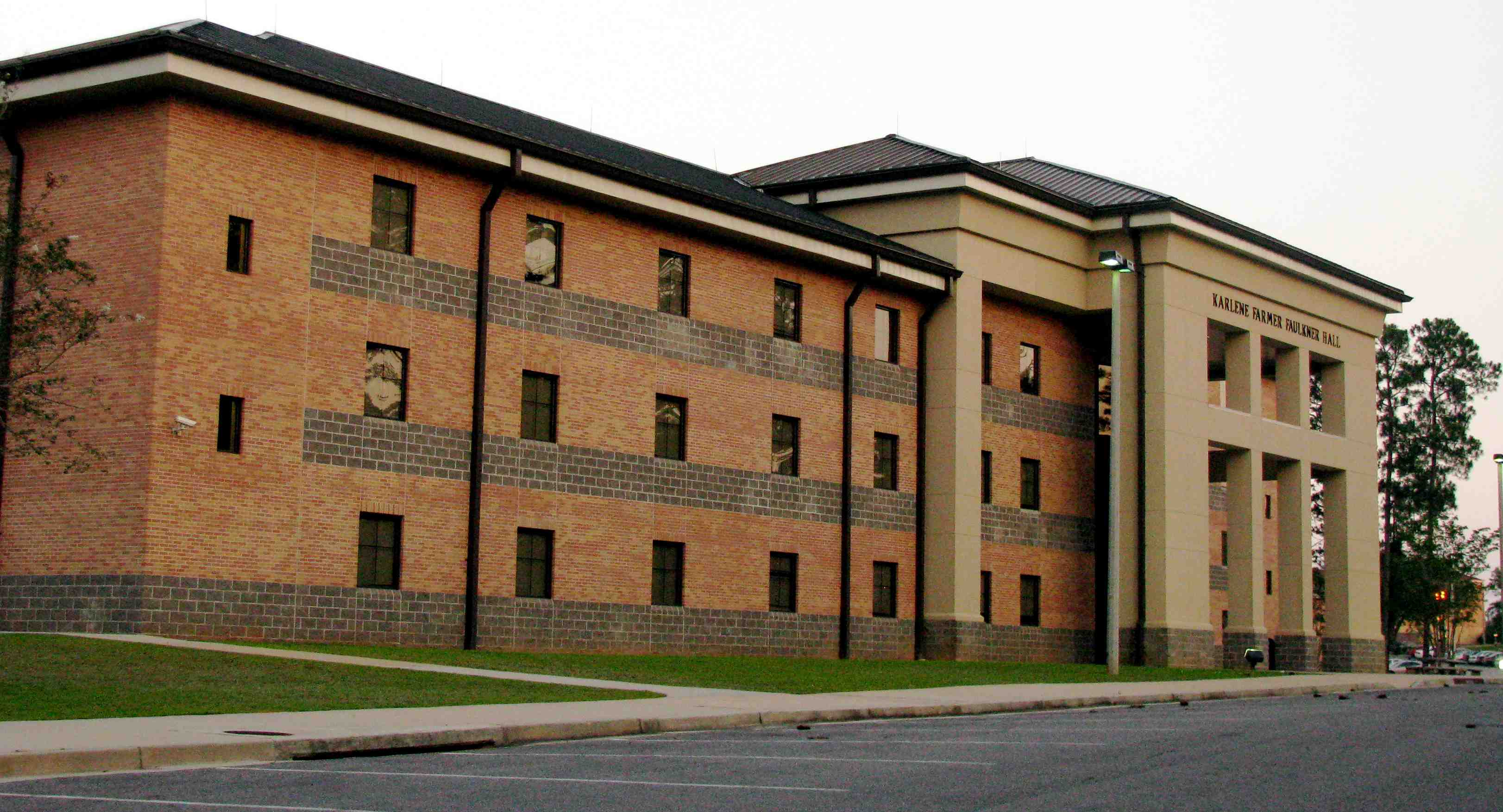
Faulkner Residence Hall

== Student life ==
The University of Mobile has 2,092 students from thirty-four states and twenty-three countries. Overall, sixty-five percent of the students enrolled are from the Mobile area or surrounding counties while seventeen percent are from other areas in Alabama. Forty percent of the student body reside on campus. Sixty-five percent of the students are Southern Baptist.

=== Residential life ===
At its inception, Mobile College was entirely a commuter school until the first residence halls, Arendall and Bedsole Halls (originally named East and West Dorms, respectively), were completed. Along with Arendall and Bedsole, President Weaver also oversaw the addition of housing cottages, which would eventually be named Avery Woods. President Magnoli oversaw the addition of the university's fourth student housing unit, the 3-storied Ingram Hall. Under President Foley the university residential area expanded to include Samford Hall, Faulkner Hall, and the Timbers, renamed Foley Hall in 2023.

== Athletics ==
The Mobile athletic teams are called the Rams. The university is a member of the National Association of Intercollegiate Athletics (NAIA), primarily competing in the Southern States Athletic Conference (SSAC; formerly known as Georgia–Alabama–Carolina Conference (GACC) until spring 2004) since the 2010–11 academic year. The Rams previously competed in the Gulf Coast Athletic Conference (GCAC) from 1985–86 to 2009–10.

Mobile competes in 22 intercollegiate varsity sports: Men's sports include baseball, basketball, bowling, cross country, golf, soccer, tennis and track and field (indoor and outdoor); while women's sports include basketball, beach volleyball, bowling, cross country, golf, soccer, softball, tennis, track and field (indoor and outdoor) and volleyball; and co-ed sports include competitive cheer and spirit squad.

The university colors are garnet, black and gray, and a ram is the mascot. The school's intercollegiate program began in 1985 as one of the first acts of the newly appointed President Magnoli. The university has won national championships in men's tennis in 1993; women's tennis (1994); men's golf, men's tennis, and women's soccer in 1997; women's golf (1998); men's soccer (2002); and women's softball (2006).

== Notable people ==
=== Alumni ===
- Michael Azira - professional soccer player
- Erin Bethea - actress
- Big Daddy Weave - contemporary Christian band
- Gina DeVettori - actress
- Joe Espada - Manager, Houston Astros
- Donna Givens - American politician from Alabama
- Sunny Mabrey - actress
- Saúl Rivera - professional baseball player
- J. C. Romero - professional baseball player
- Connie Simpson - celebrity nanny
- Sarah Thomas - college and professional football referee

=== Faculty ===
- Bob Gray, former soccer coach
