= Case Closed: Zero the Enforcer =

- Theatrical release poster
- Kanji: 名探偵コナン ゼロの執行人
- Revised Hepburn: Meitantei Conan: Zero no Shikkōnin
- Directed by: Yuzuru Tachikawa
- Screenplay by: Takeharu Sakurai
- Based on: Case Closed by Gosho Aoyama
- Produced by: Keiichi Ishiyama; Shūhō Kondō; Yoshihito Yonekura
- Starring: Minami Takayama; Kappei Yamaguchi; Rikiya Koyama; Wakana Yamazaki; Tōru Furuya; Gara Takashima; Megumi Hayashibara; Aya Ueto; Nobuo Tobita; Tokuyoshi Kawashima; Daikichi Hakata; Yukimasa Kishino
- Cinematography: Jin Nishiyama
- Edited by: Terumitsu Okada
- Music by: Katsuo Ōno
- Production company: TMS/V1 Studio
- Distributed by: Toho Company, Ltd.
- Release date: April 13, 2018
- Running time: 110 minutes
- Country: Japan
- Language: Japanese
- Box office: $107.9 million

Case Closed: Zero the Enforcer, known as Detective Conan: Zero the Enforcer (Japanese: 名探偵コナン ゼロの執行人, Hepburn: Meitantei Konan: Zero no Shikkōnin) in Japan, is a 2018 Japanese anime film directed by Yuzuru Tachikawa and written by Takeharu Sakurai. It was the twenty-second installment of the Case Closed film series based on the manga series of the same name by Gosho Aoyama, following the 2017 film Case Closed: The Crimson Love Letter. The film was released on April 13, 2018 and has grossed over $107.9 million worldwide.

== Plot ==
Located in Tokyo Bay, the newly built integrated resort and convention center "Edge of Ocean" is going to host an upcoming Summit Meeting. Prior to the Summit, an explosion went off at one of the buildings, killing and injuring many Public Security Bureau personnel performing inspection there, including Amuro Tōru and Kazami Yūya. A preliminary investigation found the fingerprint which matches with Mori Kogoro's, and with other evidence purportedly located inside Kogoro's computer, Kogoro is arrested. After a hopeless search for a lawyer who is willing to represent Kogoro in the trial, Ran, Kisaki Eri, and Conan encountered a freelance lawyer, Tachibana Kyōko, who offered to represent Kogoro in the case.

Meanwhile, the Office of the Attorney-General believes that the evidence incriminating Kogoro is sufficient to build the case, and Iwai Sayoko, the Attorney-General, instructed Kusakabe Makoto to prosecute Kogoro. At the same time, the police investigation of the case is ongoing, and it was discovered that the gas valve and pressurized cooker can be connected to the Internet (Internet of Things (IoT)) and that the two was remotely accessed via Nor (resembling Tor) through Kogoro's device to cause the explosion. On the day of the conference, people are experiencing strange cases of IoT devices malfunctioning, causing electrical short circuit and fire around Tokyo. At that time, Kogoro was being held in Tokyo Penitentiary, which means Kogoro could not have been the culprit in the bombing and the IoT attack, and the case against him was dropped.

On the date the unmanned Martian mission craft called "Hakuchō" is scheduled to land, Conan deducted the identity of the culprit of the bombing and IoT attack, the prosecutor Makoto Kusakabe. Kusakabe employed an assistant named Haba Fumikazu, who previously worked with and fell in love with Tachibana. During the investigation by Kusakabe, Haba discovered that the culprit that hacks into the system of NAZU (resembling NASA) are working in a game company. Haba was arrested for breaking into the game company and was presumed dead after the interrogation by Amuro, causing Kusakabe to exact revenge on the Public Security Bureau. Amuro then revealed that Haba's death was faked to ensure that the public prosecutor will not employ the help of the assistant in the same manner as he did to Haba again.

However, Kusakabe already hacked into the system to change the projectile of the capsule launched from Hakuchō to crash to the Tokyo Metropolitan Police building, but he causes blackout at the building and initiates the IoT attack at the nearby vicinity to allow police personnel and other residents to be evacuated to the Edge of Ocean. Although Kusakabe relented and gave up the access code, it was almost too late, and Conan and Amuro employed help from Dr. Agasa, Haibara and the Detective Boys to detonate the bomb using a drone built by Dr. Agasa near the capsule in order for the capsule to fall into the harmless spot. With the point of impact being the casino tower at the Edge of Ocean, Amuro and Conan race against time and traffic to allow Conan to shoot the ball to deflect the capsule, and the capsule falls harmlessly into the water.

== Cast ==
Character	Japanese	English
Conan Edogawa	Minami Takayama	Wendee Lee
Ran Mōri	Wakana Yamazaki	Cristina Vee
Kogorō Mōri	Rikiya Koyama	Xander Mobus
Shinichi Kudō	Kappei Yamaguchi	Griffin Burns
Ai Haibara	Megumi Hayashibara	Erica Mendez
Ayumi Yoshida	Yukiko Iwai	Janice Kawaye
Mitsuhiko Tsuburaya	Ikue Ōtani	Erika Harlacher
Genta Kojima	Wataru Takagi	Andrew Russel
Eri Kisaki	Gara Takashima	Mari Devon
Ninzaburo Shiratori	Kazuhiko Inoue	Greg Chun
Hyōe Kuroda	Yukimasa Kishino	Richard Epcar
Yūya Kazami	Nobuo Tobita	Danny Boston
Kyōko Tachibana	Aya Ueto	Cherami Leigh
Fumikazu Haba	Daikichi Hakata	Sean Chiplock
Sayoko Iwai	Miina Tominaga	Rachel Robinson
Makoto Kusakabe	Tokuyoshi Kawashima	Lex Lang
Rei Furuya/Tōru Amuro	Tōru Furuya	Kyle McCarley

== Production ==
Case Closed: Zero the Enforcer was directed by Yuzuru Tachikawa. It is the first film to feature the character Tōru Amuro since 2016's Case Closed: The Darkest Nightmare and the first to feature Hyōe Kuroda. The film's theme song is "Zero" (零 -ZERO-) performed by Masaharu Fukuyama.

The film was dubbed in English by Bang Zoom! Entertainment, marking the first official English dub of a Case Closed film since 2010. The dub uses the original Japanese character names (ex. "Shinichi Kudō", "Ran Mōri") instead of the Americanized names (ex. "Jimmy Kudo", "Rachel Moore") that Funimation and Viz Media use in the anime and manga respectively.

The film is set in Urban Dock LaLaport TOYOSU, Tokyo, and the background of some of the live-action video of the ending credits is in Incheon Metropolitan City, South Korea.

== Release ==
The English dub was first shown in the United Arab Emirates with Arabic subtitles before being shown in America at the 2019 Anime Expo using 4DX technology. On June 30, 2020, TMS announced on Twitter an English Blu-ray release slated for September, which was released on September 29, 2020, by Discotek Media. The film is also available for digital streaming on Amazon Prime Video.

== Box office ==
Debuting on 384 screens with Toho distributing, Case Closed: Zero the Enforcer earned $12.1 million from 1.012 million admissions in its first weekend and ranked number-one at the Japanese box office. The 22nd Case Closed feature film earned ¥9.18 billion ($83,134,719) from its domestic run, becoming the 9th highest-grossing anime film of all time, and the top-grossing film in the Case Closed anime franchise, surpassing the 21st film The Crimson Love Letter which grossed ¥6.87 billion in 2017.

Overseas, the film grossed CN¥127,365,000 ($19,746,512) in China, and ₩3,207,824,361 ($2,393,406) in South Korea, ¥149 million in Taiwan, $63,401 in the United Arab Emirates, and $75,161 in Spain. In total, the film's worldwide gross was $108.11 million by January 2019, and $108.2 million as of March 2022.
