= Chiburi =

Feudal Japanese tradition used in martial arts

Chiburui

Japanese name
- Kanji: 血振るい
- Hiragana: ちぶるい
Transcriptions
- Revised Hepburn: chiburui
- Kunrei-shiki: tiburui

Chiburui (血振るい), also called chiburi, is the process by which one symbolically removes blood from a sword blade. The term chiburui can thus be translated as "shaking off the blood". In the Japanese martial art of iaidō, this is done before nōtō or placing the blade back into the scabbard (known as saya).

== In popular culture ==
In films set in feudal Japan, such as Zatoichi, chiburi is usually performed by swordsmen after the killing of an opponent. However, chiburi is incorrectly portrayed as a simple swipe that completely removes all of the blood. In reality, the sword needs to be thoroughly wiped with a cloth as there would still be enough blood on the blade to cause rusting.

The chiburui is also present in the Rise of the Ronin in which it is used during fights to regain stamina and after battles against powerful opponents (or after clearing enemy camps). During battle, it is shown as a simple Zatoichi-like swipe, but after battle, it is used more correctly, with the protagonist using a cloth or their sleeve to clean their blades.

Atsu also uses both types of Chiburui in the video game Ghost of Yotei, usually when the player manually sheathes her weapons after a fight, although she also does so automatically after completing a mission or killing an important target. She only use the "true" version of the chiburui (using a cloth) during cutscenes after killing one of her main targets.

Ryu Hayabusa also uses it in every *Ninja Gaiden* game since the second installment, but only in its "Zatoichi version." Just like that character, he is seen simply "shaking" his blades once, instantly causing the blood on them to fall to the ground.
