= Connie Simpson =

American nanny

- Born: December 2, 1958 (age 67); Mobile, Alabama
- Education: Mississippi University for Women, Mobile College, Southern University
- Occupation: Nanny

Connie Simpson, who professionally also goes by Nanny Connie (born 1958), is an American childcare professional. She is best known for her work helping celebrity families care for their babies. She is the author of The Nanny Connie Way.

== Biography ==
Simpson was born on December 2, 1958 in Mobile, Alabama, where she grew up. Her mother was one of the few African-Americans to be nurses in town. She grew up as part of a very large extended family, and soon realized she was interested in caring for children, beginning work as a nanny for her neighbors.

She attended McGill–Toolen Catholic High School, where she played volleyball, before attending the Mississippi University for Women, Mobile College, and Southern University. By age 24, however, she had become a single mother. She worked a variety of jobs, from substitute teacher to baker, before ultimately becoming a baby nurse. She was soon able to get more selective, working with well-to-do families in Mobile and then in Fairhope.

By 2005, she started working with members of the top 1%. One of these individuals was friends with Brooke Shields and Bridget Moynahan, and in 2006, she was called in to help both Shields and Moynahan, beginning her career as a baby nurse for celebrities.

She has cared for the children of Justin Timberlake, Matt Damon, Amal Clooney, and Emily Blunt, among others. She has stated that one of her focuses is on acknowledging that celebrity parents are still parents with the same worries and fears as any other parent. She has claimed to have "never been starstruck", and in fact once told Matt Damon that she "didn't know a damn thing" about his movies. She was reportedly recommended to Meghan, Duchess of Sussex and Prince Harry, Duke of Sussex, though she ultimately did not work for them.

She has stated that "a village is a beautiful thing" and that parents aren't meant to just do their job on their own. She has emphasized parental growth. She has also discussed the Black maternal mortality crisis. She has stated that she arrives a few days before the baby's birth, and has stayed for up to five years at times. She refers to all her clients as her children.

She published her book, The Nanny Connie Way, in 2018. Jessica Biel and Jessica Alba, both of whom she has worked with, attended the launch event. She has also launched her own AR app.
