= Detective Conan: Private Eye in the Distant Sea =

- Theatrical release poster
- Kanji: 名探偵コナン 絶海の探偵(プライベート・アイ)
- Revised Hepburn: Meitantei Konan: Zekkai no Puraibēto Ai
- Directed by: Kobun Shizuno
- Written by: Takeharu Sakurai
- Based on: Case Closed by Gosho Aoyama
- Produced by: Keiichi Ishiyama; Michihiko Suwa; Mitomu Asai
- Starring: Minami Takayama; Kappei Yamaguchi; Wakana Yamazaki; Rikiya Koyama; Megumi Hayashibara; Ryo Horikawa; Yuko Miyamura; Naoko Matsui; Kenichi Ogata; Yukiko Iwai; Ikue Ohtani; Wataru Takagi; Ko Shibasaki; Ryōtarō Okiayu; Takaya Kuroda
- Cinematography: Jin Nishiyama
- Edited by: Terumitsu Okada
- Music by: Katsuo Ono; Masakazu Yokoyama
- Production company: TMS/V1 Studio
- Distributed by: Toho
- Release date: April 20, 2013
- Running time: 101 minutes
- Country: Japan
- Language: Japanese
- Box office: US$ 36,054,366

Detective Conan: Private Eye in the Distant Sea (名探偵コナン 絶海の探偵(プライベート・アイ), Meitantei Konan: Zekkai no Puraibēto Ai) is a 2013 Japanese animated drama thriller film part of the film series based on the Case Closed manga and anime series. The film aired on April 19, 2014, on Nippon TV as well.

== Plot ==
At Maizuru Bay, coast guard Masaki Kurata finds a suspicious boat during his patrol. Upon inspection, he discovers some explosives within and immediately reports to the Wakasa Coast Guard. The discovery quickly hits the news reports, where it is revealed that the boat had likely entered Japanese territory illegally and had components within which were not found in Japan.

Later that morning, Conan Edogawa, Ran and Kogoro Mouri, Sonoko Suzuki and the Detective Boys board an Atago Class destroyer, JDS Hotaka, to experience public military exercises after winning the tickets. The participants are invited into the ship's combat information center (CIC), where a simulation of an air-to-air combat was being conducted. However, after having "shot down" the two set-up targets, the guards continue to detect a sonar response of an unidentified target approaching the vessel. The tactical action officer quickly reports this to their captain, Yukio Tateishi, who orders them to search for the target with all radars, before heading to the CIC himself. Following him is a female JSDF member, Nanami Fuji. Yukio instructed the crews to prepare for anti-submarine combat, and a torpedo was fired which hit the target.

Conan, along with Ai Haibara, who was in Osaka, suspects that a spy, codenamed X, was among the civilians who boarded the ship. Conan then notices a sick boy, called Yuki by a man close by, with no accompanying adult. Yuki made Conan wonder whether the man was Yuki's father. Originally planning to follow the duo, Conan was stopped by Kogoro. Conan then notices Nanami, who's also on the deck at the time. She told Conan she was a cook on board, which he saw through as a lie due to her captain insignia. Kogoro originally wanted to hand Nanami one of his golden business cards, but they were scattered around due to his clumsiness, and the group picked the cards up and handed them to Ran.

Hotaka's captains Yukio Tateishi and Makoto Sekiguchi from the Wakasa Military Police discuss a newly found severed arm with Kogoro and Ran. They deduce that the arm was sucked in by the pumping system and was stuck in the filter, and Yukio reveals that the arm likely was part of a lieutenant at the Wakasa base who was missing. As the pumping system started operating before the ship departed Maizuru, the body had already drifted away. Conan inconspicuously proposed that they use a helicopter to transport the arm to mainland Japan for an autopsy, masking it as a demonstration. They encounter Yuki, who dropped some pills which he said was for food allergies, before being led away by his apparent father.

In Osaka, Heiji Hattori receives a call from Conan, who informs him of the current situation. Heiji and Kazuha Toyama heads off to Maizuru to investigate further. They found the body of the lieutenant whose hand was found earlier. Heiji notices a red stain on the neck and discreetly retrieves it, and informs Conan of the discovery of the body. He deduces that the body drifted there after the arm was separated from the body at Maizuru. Conan then suggests that Heiji and Kazuha meet up with Dr. Agasa and Haibara.

Juzo Megure, Miwako Sato, Wataru Takagi of the Tokyo Metropolitan Police Department and two officers from Wakasa Coast Guard, Kurata and Tsutomu Munekawa, landed at the ship in a helicopter with the autopsy report, which stated that the man died between 4 AM and 6 AM from drowning. A phone belonging to the body was also found on the deck, with the last email after 9 PM and the last call at 5:30 AM. Kogoro deduces that the man had a fight with someone on the deck and fell overboard. An empty microSD slot on the phone was discovered, leading Kogoro to think that the card originally in the slot was the culprit's target.

Conan finds Nanami spying on the investigation team and gives chase, leading to her entering the captain's office. Conan tricks Nanami out of the office by imitating the captain's voice, and attempts to extract the data within the microSD card, but Nanami soon reenters, forcing Conan to stop the extraction halfway. When the police arrive at her office, Conan forced Nanami to reveal herself as part of the Intelligence Security Command. The Command suspects that X was targeting classified information on the Aegis-class Destroyers and might be on board. She also revealed that the victim, whose name was Sasaura, was the Director of Intelligence for the Wakasa SDF base and was in charge of protecting the information on the ships, and that X was suspected as the killer.

Investigations have revealed that in the morning, the victim was seen waving a Japanese flag at Maizuru Harbor. Makoto then revealed that confidential data about the destroyers were leaked and sent to a shell company of a spy named Takekawa, who was spotted in Kyoto. Heiji then went to a park in Kyoto where Takekawa was spotted, and took a photo of his burnt memo before police arrived. They then learned that Takekawa took a train to Osaka, and deduces that he went to Kansai International Airport. Kazuha finds Takekawa in a warehouse and chases him to a dead end. Takekawa attempts shoots Kazuha, but Heiji jumps in and takes the bullet for her. Osaka Police soon arrived and arrested Takekawa on site.

Back on the ship, Conan deduces that the man who claims to be Yuki's father was X, and tells Yuki to hide. X attempts to silence Conan but flees as there were too many civilians around. Yuki stops Conan from giving chase, fearing for his real father's safety. X then destroys the footage and takes Yuki hostage, but was spotted by Ran. Yuki tells her X's true identity as a spy, leading to Ran fighting X, but she is defeated and fell overboard into the ocean. Yuki then leads the police to X, who takes a crew member hostage. Conan manages to knocks out X by kick the soccer ball at him with Nanami's help.

Conan then tranquilizes Kogoro and explains the truth about the body. He reveals that Kurata had killed Sasaura, with an audio file of a conversation made by Sasaura of the metallic clinking sounds to be the sound when Kurata's expandable baton struck his gun when he walked to be evidence. Kurata reveals that he chased Sasaura to a cliff and accidentally fell into the sea when the rock he was standing on collapsed. He had requested to be a member of the investigation team to cover up the incident, and had planted Sasaura's phone to mislead investigators. He is then arrested for interfering with the investigation.

Shortly after, The Detective Boys, Yuki, and Sonoko inform the larger group of Ran's disappearance. The police also revealed that X had admitted throwing a high-school aged girl who is skilled in karate overboard during the fight. Realizing that it was Ran who was thrown overboard, Hotaka makes a U-turn back to the spot which Ran was thought to have been thrown overboard. A helicopter was sent out to investigate, however it was unable to locate her. Conan, remembering that Ran had kept a number of Mori's golden business cards, instructs the helicopter to follow a glittering trail, revealed to be the business cards scattered in sea. Eventually they manage to locate and rescue her alive.

During the credits, Yuki reunites with his father, while Conan salutes to Yuki. As Conan was about to leave in the post-credits scene, Nanami asks him who he really is. Conan innocently states that he's just a typical elementary school student, and runs off, leaving Nanami to wonder over what he said.

== Cast ==
- Minami Takayama as Conan Edogawa
  - Kappei Yamaguchi as Shinichi Kudo
- Wakana Yamazaki as Ran Mouri
- Rikiya Koyama as Kogoro Mouri
- Ryō Horikawa as Heiji Hattori
- Yuko Miyamura as Kazuha Toyama
- Ken'ichi Ogata as Dr. Hiroshi Agasa
- Megumi Hayashibara as Ai Haibara
- Chafurin as Juzo Megure
- Yukiko Iwai as Ayumi Yoshida
- Ikue Ōtani as Mitsuhiko Tsuburaya
- Wataru Takagi as Genta Kojima and Wataru Takagi
- Atsuko Yuya as Miwako Sato
- Naoko Matsui as Sonoko Suzuki
- Ryōtarō Okiayu as Fumimaro Ayanokoji
- Takaya Kuroda as X
- Ko Shibasaki as Nanami Fuji

== Soundtrack ==
The film's soundtrack titled Detective Conan "Private Eye in the Distant Sea" Original Soundtrack (名探偵コナン「絶海の探偵」オリジナル・サウンドトラック, Meitantei Konan "Zekkai no Puraibēto Ai" Orijinaru Saundotorakku) contains 75 songs from the film's score and was released on April 17, 2013. The film's theme song is "One More Time" performed by Kazuyoshi Saito.

== Reception ==
In the Japanese Box Office, the film earned a total of 3,572,987,671 yen (US$35,311,837) across 210 theatres and became the franchise's highest-grossing film at the box office. It was the 7th highest-grossing film of the year in the country.

Yahoo! Japan, which opens the films to different critics, ranked the film with a 3.60 rank star out of five stars.
