= Gina DeVettori =

American actress and writer

- Born: California, United States
- Education: University of Mobile
- Occupations: Actress, writer
- Known for: Opie Gets Laid; 40 Days and 40 Nights
- Website: ginadevettori.com (Archived)

Gina DeVettori is an American actress and writer.

== Early years ==
DeVettori was born on May 5, and is a native Californian. She graduated from the University of Mobile with a Bachelor of Arts in theatre.

== Work ==
DeVettori has appeared in the films 40 Days and 40 Nights, Party Animalz, High Hopes, Opie Gets Laid, The Shiftling, Gothic Vampires from Hell, and The Mexican Dream. She was also the voice of Ayane in the English-language edition of Dead or Alive 2: Hardcore.
