= Ninja Gaiden 3 =

2012 video game

- Developer: Team Ninja
- Publisher: Tecmo Koei
- Directors: Fumihiko Yasuda; Yosuke Hayashi
- Producer: Yosuke Hayashi
- Designers: Kazutaka Otsuka; Motoi Tanahashi; Hiroyuki Nishi
- Programmers: Takanori Goshima; Yasuhiro Nakamoto; Shuhei Sato
- Artists: Kenichiro Nakajo; Masahiro Nose; Kai Shibusawa
- Writer: Masato Kato
- Composers: Takumi Saito; Ryo Koike; Hiroaki Takahashi
- Series: Ninja Gaiden
- Platforms: PlayStation 3; Xbox 360
- Release: NA: March 20, 2012; JP/AU: March 22, 2012; EU: March 23, 2012
- Genres: Action-adventure, hack and slash
- Modes: Single-player, multiplayer

Ninja Gaiden 3 (Note: Japanese: NINJA GAIDEN(ニンジャ ガイデン) 3, Hepburn: Ninja Gaiden Surī) is a 2012 action-adventure game developed by Team Ninja and published by Tecmo Koei worldwide for the PlayStation 3 and the Xbox 360 in March 2012. An updated version, Ninja Gaiden 3: Razor's Edge, was released later that year, originally published by Nintendo for the Wii U, and later ported to multiple platforms.

The game is the first in the modern series to be directed by someone other than franchise director Tomonobu Itagaki, with Fumihiko Yasuda and Yosuke Hayashi taking over directorial duties. A sequel, Ninja Gaiden 4, was released on October 21, 2025.

== Gameplay ==
A screenshot of Ryu fighting the "Steel Spider" boss

Ninja Gaiden 3 features new mechanics and changes. Such new features include "Steel on Bone", a new visual cinematic trick which allows players to cut through the body during a slow-motion sequence. The new Kunai Climb involves Ryu climbing onto certain walls with the use of his kunai, which he can use to attack enemies from above. In other situations, the player has to be stealthy, as Ryu can now sneak up on an enemy and kill him with a single strike. Enemies speak while fighting and do not die quickly, and they suffer and scream in pain when injured. They are no longer decapitated or dismembered, instead they just bleed and weaken.

Some changes include the slide maneuver, which replaces the Reverse Wind Technique from the previous games. Ryu uses it to get through small passages as well as to attack enemies. The Ultimate Technique concept has slightly changed in the form of Ryu's cursed right arm known as the Grip of the Murder. When he kills a specific number of enemies his arm glows red. Then, the player can charge up for an ultimate attack that is fueled by absorbing nearby fallen bodies instead of essence.

Unlike past games, the HUD appears only when Ryu is engaged in battle, then fades out later. The Muramasa store is no longer present; Ryu gets different swords over the course of the game. He also has access to his shuriken and a high-tech bow; arrows for the bow are also improved as the game progresses. Both projectile weapons have infinite ammo. Items are virtually non-existent. The Dragon Statues that allowed Ryu to save and heal are replaced by a scripted Falcon who swoops down to Ryu's hand and saves at specific points in the level, restoring his health to full as well.

The Ninpo concept has been revamped. In the single-player mode, Ryu has access to only one Ninpo that transforms him into a giant dragon of fire. To activate it, the player must first defeat enemies to fill up a bar beneath the healthbar. Once it is full, the player can activate the Ninpo and kill all onscreen enemies at once, restoring Ryu's life in the process. The amount of health gained depends on how many enemies were left when the Ninpo was cast. In the multiplayer modes (both co-op and competitive), there are other Ninpo available, such as the Art of the Piercing Void.

The PlayStation 3 version of Ninja Gaiden 3 has an optional control scheme for the use of the PlayStation Move. This is to give players "a new visceral edge when battling and slicing through their enemy's flesh and bone."

== Plot ==
The plot begins when Ryu is called upon by the Japanese Self-Defense Force to deal with a terrorist group led by the mysterious alchemist, the Regent of the Mask, who personally wanted the Dragon Ninja to come. Upon encountering the alchemist at the Prime Minister's residence in London, he curses Ryu's right arm with the Grip of Murder which thrives on all the lives Ryu has taken, causing the Dragon Sword to be absorbed into Ryu's arm. Later, Ryu and JSDF member Mizuki McCloud watch as the Regent demands the immediate surrender by the nations of the world in seven days, or face annihilation.

After the JDSF's ship Yunagi intercepts a signal coming from the Rub' al Khali desert, Ryu departs there with Mizuki and meets Ayane, who gives him the Tenshin clan's treasured Jinran-Maru sword at Hayate's request. Ryu makes his way to a tower in the desert, where he again encounters the Regent of the Mask, who reveals that the affliction of the Grip of Murder used the Dragon Sword as a medium for the curse, then broke its structure down and transmutated it into Ryu's arm, and reveals that without treatment, the curse will rot his arm from the inside out and spread throughout his body, killing him. After defeating an attack helicopter, Ryu returns to the Yunagi, where he meets Mizuki's daughter Canna and Cliff Higgins, Mizuki's brother-in-law. Cliff reveals that the group they were fighting are called the Lords of Alchemy (LOA).

Ryu departs for Abismo Island. There, he faces the Regent once again, and defeats the clone of a Gigantosaurus created by him. However, Ryu discovers that Mizuki has been captured. He rescues Mizuki, only for her to knock him unconscious with a tranquilizer gun.

Ryu awakens in a VR simulator, where he meets the alluring and sinister Lovelace. She demonstrates that in the simulator he can be hurt or killed, and Ryu is forced to go through with the simulation, taking him to places from his past, from the blimp to Vigoor, to the Sky City in Tokyo, to the Prime Minister's residence, where he squared off with a virtual Regent of the Mask. After escaping, Ryu fights his way through the LOA guards. Eventually he finds Canna and escapes with her to find her mother. They find Mizuki, held captive by the Regent. After the reunion, the Regent ruthlessly pushes Lovelace into a prototype God's Egg, and Ryu is forced to fight a mutated version of Lovelace. After defeating her altered form, Ryu escapes with Canna and Mizuki, only to be arrested by the U.S. military. The two are reprimanded by Captain Heinlern for their actions and are ordered to cease their operation immediately. Ryu travels via helicopter back to Hayabusa Village to find out how to remove the curse.

First, Ryu revisits Genshin's grave where he placed the Blade of the Archfiend at the end of Ninja Gaiden II. He takes the blade and travels back to village, fighting hordes of vengeful Black Spider Ninja until the Grip of Murder begins to take its toll on him, causing him to lose consciousness. He awakens in the clan leader's residence, nursed to health by the Dragon Shrine Maiden, Momiji. Ryu and Momiji travel to the hermitage where his father Joe Hayabusa lives. On the way, they are attacked by the Black Spider Ninja as well as the Black Spider Clan sorceress Obaba, who somehow came back to life. After the battle, they make their way to Joe's house. Joe tells Ryu that the curse is karmic retribution for all the deeds committed by the Dragon Ninja Clan over the generations.

Back on the Yunagi, Ryu is sent on an operation to Antarctica with Cliff requesting that he should be Ryu's backup. After defeating numerous foes there including an evil version of himself called the Epigonos, the Grip of Murder begins to activate. Cliff reveals himself as a member of the LOA, along with his grandfather Ashtear Higgins, the Chairman of LOA, who reveals that Cliff is the head of LOA's research and that he has plans for Canna. Soon after, Ryu attempts to chase down Cliff and Ashtear, but is left behind when he is knocked off their jet. Cliff tells Ryu that he would meet him on the Black Narwhal, a cloaking submersible aircraft carrier. Ryu is picked up by Ken Ishigami from the JSDF and transported to a UN vessel, where he is told that Canna is missing.

Ryu and Mizuki fly over the Black Narwhal, and Ryu jumps off and proceeds to take down the escort ships before landing on the main ship itself. There he faces off with Ashtear and defeats him. Ryu learns of his plans for Canna just before killing him and proceeds to search for her inside the ship. Eventually he would come face to face with the Regent of the Mask, watching as Canna is fused with the Egg of a God. Ryu defeats the Regent and is shocked to see that the man is actually Canna's father, Theodore Higgins, who was thought to be dead. Cliff appears and reveals that he killed his brother when he tried to stop his plan, but for the purpose of him dying at Ryu's hand, he brought him back from the dead, and erased his memories, while controlling him through an AI unit in the mask. Canna sees this and calls Ryu a murderer, merging with the Egg to become the Goddess, wielding the Dragon Sword as the Black Narwhal sinks into the ocean.

Ryu, Mizuki and Ishigami pursue the Goddess to Tokyo where she left a trail of destruction. Ryu and Mizuki are attacked by Cliff, who has transformed into a mutant creature. Ryu and Mizuki are about to be killed when Theodore appears and kills Cliff, his memories fully restored. Ryu and Theodore continue their pursuit of the Goddess, but when they are about to reach her, Theodore suddenly betrays Ryu, stating that the Blade of the Archfiend Ryu uses will kill Canna indiscriminately as it is an evil blade. The two men battle for the final time. After Ryu kills him with the Blade of the Archfiend, Theodore chants an incantation and the curse on Ryu is removed. Ryu realizes that Theodore wants to die as atonement.

Ryu confronts the Goddess. As the battle reaches its climax, the Blade of the Archfiend and the Goddess' giant Dragon Sword are broken to their hilts. Ryu's original Dragon Sword returns to him, and he cuts the Goddess in half, killing it. Canna falls into Ryu's arms, safe and alive. Ryu leaves her in a safe area for Mizuki to find her. With his duty complete, he departs into the sunrise.

== Development and release ==
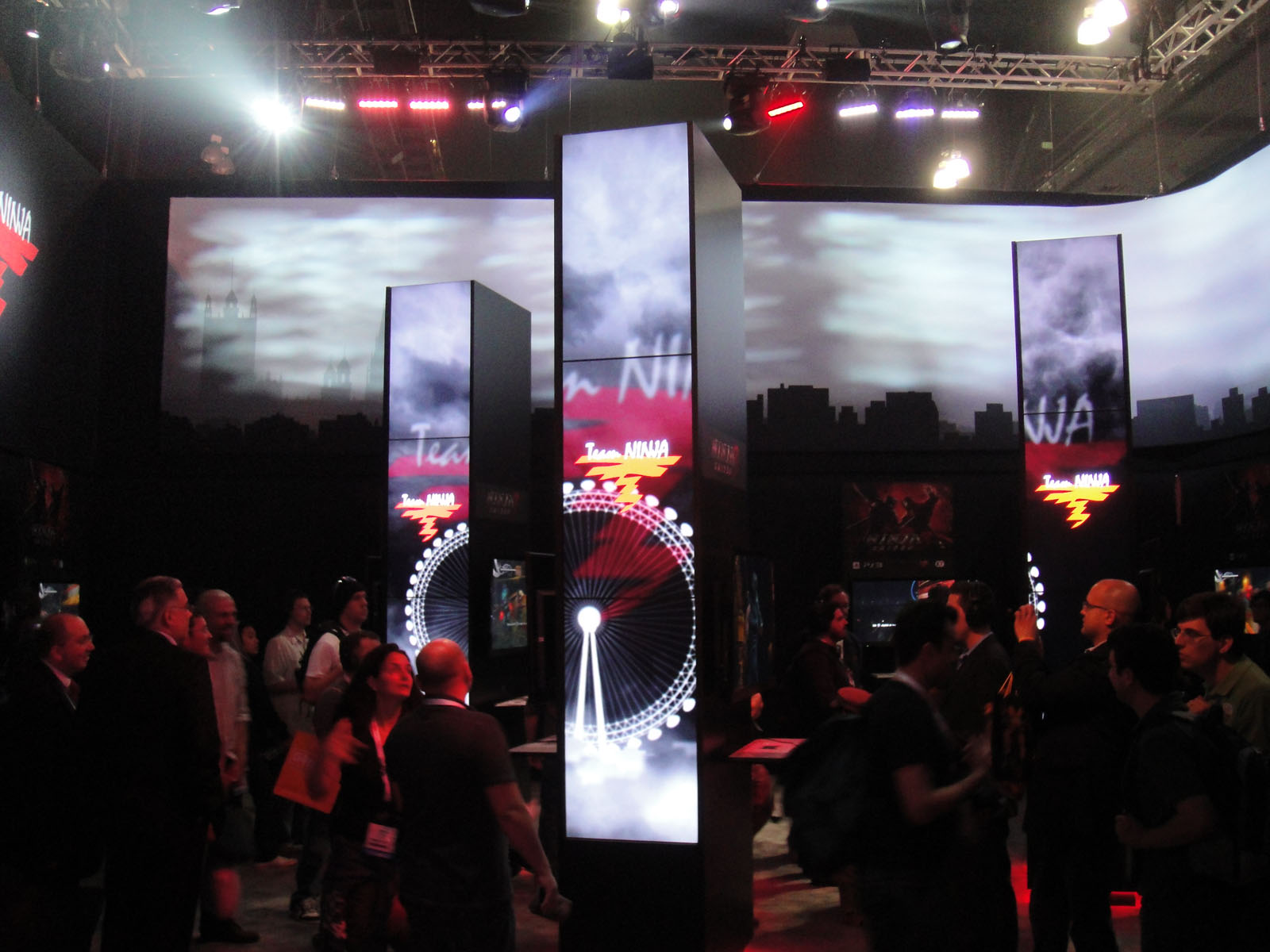
Ninja Gaiden 3 exposition at the Electronic Entertainment Expo 2011

The game was announced at a closed-door event at the Tokyo Game Show 2010, with only one image shown. A teaser poster depicting a blood ridden Ryu pulling on his mask was released thereafter. The head of Team Ninja, Yosuke Hayashi said: "He seems to be doing something with right hand. Also, there's something not normal about this hand. It's covered in blood, but there's something unnatural regarding the blood." Hayashi later gave more details: "Ryu is unmasking himself, and it's a way of attracting people to his world. We are trying to have people enter the real Ryu Hayabusa. The amount of blood doesn't revolve around the idea of killing people, either; it could also be Ryu's blood. We're focusing not only on cutting people but also Ryu himself."

The development team did not include an ability to dismember limbs, which was a key graphical element of the previous modern games. A Team Ninja staff member stated that "people do not want to see that anymore" and so they had removed it from the game. At Electronic Entertainment Expo 2011, it was revealed that the game features competitive and cooperative multiplayer modes with one or both modes supporting up to eight players.

The game's story was written by Masato Kato, who wrote the plotline and designed graphics for the original Ninja Gaiden trilogy for the Nintendo Entertainment System. Hayashi mentioned that characters from the NES series would appear. Robert, a notable character from Ninja Gaiden II: The Dark Sword of Chaos, makes a cameo as a pilot who helps Ryu jump onto another jet.

A demo of the fighting game Dead or Alive 5, packaged with Ninja Gaiden 3, features Ryu Hayabusa, Ayane, Hayate and Hitomi. The Xbox 360 version of the demo allows the use of Hayabusa and Hitomi, while the PlayStation 3 version makes Hayate and Ayane playable. The collector's edition of Ninja Gaiden 3 makes all four characters playable. A new statuette of Ryu battling one of the game's bosses was released by Koei Tecmo Wave and included with Ninja Gaiden 3 Collector's Edition available at GameStop and EB Games in the United States, Canada, and the United Kingdom, along with an art book, soundtrack CD, and a premium code for the full Dead or Alive 5 demo.

Three downloadable content packs were released throughout April 2012. They contain new weapons (Falcon's Talons and Eclipse Scythe), armor and headgear customization items. Furthermore, new "Ninja Trials" minigames were released.

== Reception ==
Reception

Aggregate score
Aggregator	Score
Metacritic	PS3: 58/100; X360: 58/100

Review scores
Publication	Score
Computer and Video Games	8/10
G4	2/5
GameSpot	5.5/10
Giant Bomb	2/5
IGN	3/10
PlayStation Official Magazine – UK	7/10
Official Xbox Magazine (US)	8/10

Ninja Gaiden 3 was met with generally mixed reviews, with most criticism aimed at the game being too streamlined. Aggregating review website Metacritic gave the Xbox 360 version 58/100 and the PlayStation 3 version 58/100.

Some of the reviews were fairly positive. Official Xbox Magazine gave it an 8 out of 10, praising the combat and graphics, but criticizing the streamlined approach and the ending. The Official PlayStation Magazine UK gave it a 7 out of 10, saying "it's largely fun even if it doesn't quite deliver on its grand objectives." Computer and Video Games rated the game 8/10, even as "the hardcore [gamers], who previously gritted teeth and suffered through the punishment are unlikely to forgive the myriad concessions to the wider audience."

On the other hand, GameSpot gave the game a 5.5 out of 10 rating, calling it "a shallow action game with little of the series' challenge and depth." IGN gave the game a 3 out of 10, calling it "a technical disaster."

== Ninja Gaiden 3: Razor's Edge ==
The updated and expanded version titled Ninja Gaiden 3: Razor's Edge was released for the Wii U in 2012, and for the PlayStation 3 and Xbox 360 in 2013. This is the version Koei Tecmo has chosen to include in the Ninja Gaiden: Master Collection, released in June 2021 for the Microsoft Windows, Nintendo Switch, PlayStation 4, and Xbox One.
