= Ninja Gaiden II =

2008 video game

- European cover art
- Developer: Team Ninja (Note: Supervision and support development provided by Microsoft Game Studios Japan)
- Publisher: Microsoft Game Studios
- Directors: Tomonobu Itagaki; Hiroaki Matsui; Katsunori Ehara
- Producers: Tomonobu Itagaki; Yoshifuru Okamoto
- Designer: Tatsuki Tsunoda
- Programmers: Hiroaki Ozawa; Yasushi Maeda; Takuro Sasaki
- Artists: Kenichiro Nakajo; Kazuki Motosa; Masato Onishi
- Series: Ninja Gaiden
- Platform: Xbox 360
- Release: NA: 3 June 2008; JP: 5 June 2008; EU: 6 June 2008; AU: 12 June 2008
- Genres: Action-adventure, hack and slash
- Mode: Single-player

Ninja Gaiden II (Note: Japanese: NINJA GAIDEN(ニンジャ ガイデン) II, Hepburn: Ninja Gaiden Tsū) is a 2008 action-adventure game developed by Team Ninja and published by Microsoft Game Studios for the Xbox 360. It was the last game directed by Tomonobu Itagaki before his departure from Tecmo. An alternative version, Ninja Gaiden Sigma 2, was released by Tecmo Koei for the PlayStation 3 in 2009, and for the PlayStation Vita in 2013. A remaster, Ninja Gaiden 2 Black, was released for PlayStation 5, Windows and Xbox Series X/S on 23 January 2025.

Ninja Gaiden II was revealed at the Tokyo Game Show 2007. It went unreleased in Germany as it lacked an USK rating. Ninja Gaiden II received positive reviews, with praise for its difficulty, fast-paced combat, and violence, although some criticized its lack of innovation. It had sold 1.1 million copies worldwide as of December 2008. Ninja Gaiden 3 was released in 2012.

== Gameplay ==
Ryu Hayabusa fighting enemies in Ninja Gaiden II

Ninja Gaiden II's new combat system allows the player character Ryu to dismember his enemies, severing their limbs and tearing their bodies apart covering his weapon and everything around with blood. Compared to Ninja Gaiden, the sequel contains more gore and graphic violence. Dismemberment will weaken or slow down an enemy, depending on if an arm or leg is severed, but not necessarily kill it. In fact, an injured enemy will be prone to use suicide tactics such as pinning Ryu down and planting an incendiary shuriken on him, forcing the player to quickly finish off his opponents using new, brutal Obliteration Techniques before injured enemies can get the upper hand. This new mechanic can also be triggered in the presence of boss characters. Compared to other action-adventure titles, the player can be just as vulnerable to attack as the enemies can during fight encounters.

Aside from his standard melee techniques, Ryu can absorb nearby essence in combat. These colored globes of energy are released from the bodies of slain enemies, and absorbed into Ryu's body when he comes close to them. Essence has an important role towards general game play, acting to heal Ryu, restore his ki, or increase his cash. However, the player can cause Ryu to deliberately draw in essence, which can then be used to unleash powerful attacks known as Ultimate Techniques. When Ryu fights and takes damage, there is a red bar that starts building on the right of Ryu's health bar, which is called lasting damage. After Ryu has slaughtered all of his enemies in that particular area, his health recharges, but only to the point where the red bar starts. Herbs of Spiritual Life and Save Statues can heal this lasting damage, however. Also, when Ryu is done fighting, he performs a chiburui (the act of swatting blood off of his weapon). He does this for every weapon, with a different animation for each one. Ryu can stand still and attempt to block attacks (though enemies can break his guard and leave him vulnerable to attack) or he can dodge by dashing away in a maneuver called Reverse Wind. The game also takes two elements from the "Hurricane Pack" upgrade from the original game: camera rotation and the ability to charge up for an Ultimate technique without the need for essence (this takes time to charge up; essence can still be absorbed to speed up the process).

Ryu will use his signature Dragon Sword in combat, but new weapons, such as the Eclipse Scythe, Dragon's Claw and Tiger's Fang swords, Tonfa, Kusari-gama and the Falcon's Talons ninja claws will allow the player more variety in dispatching enemies. Ryu's new magical spells, in the form of ninpo, includes the Art of the Flame Phoenix, Art of the Wind Blades, and the Art of the Piercing Void. However, weapons and ninpo from the original Ninja Gaiden will return in the form of the Art of the Inferno and the Vigoorian Flail. The returning Windmill Shuriken, Incendiary Shurikens, and bow (Renamed the Fiend's Bane Bow), can now draw in essences like all of Ryu's melee weapons to discharge their own Ultimate Technique.

== Plot ==
The game's protagonist is Ryu Hayabusa, master ninja, descendant of the Dragon Ninja lineage and current wielder of the Dragon Sword. One year after Ninja Gaiden Black, master blacksmith Muramasa is setting up shop in Tokyo, Japan. A CIA agent named Sonia enters the shop and asks for Ryu's whereabouts, until members of the Black Spider Ninja Clan attack and kidnap her. Enter the Dragon Ninja Ryu, who fails to stop Sonia's kidnapping and makes haste around the Tokyo skyscrapers and rescues the agent, who informs him of an attack on the Hayabusa Village by the Black Spider Ninjas. They wish to steal the Demon Statue, guarded in the Village since Ryu recovered it during the events of Ninja Gaiden.

Ryu returns to his home and finds his father, Joe Hayabusa dueling with Genshin, leader of the Black Spider Ninja Clan. Unfortunately, the Demon Statue is taken away by Queen of the Greater Fiends and the Ruler of Blood, Elizébet, and Joe urges his son to retrieve the statue at all costs. Ryu travels around the world with Sonia, in pursuit of Elizébet and the Demon Statue, while encountering legions of Black Spider Ninjas, Fiends, and three other Greater Fiends: Alexei, the Graceful Ruler of Lightning; Volf, the Invincible Ruler of Storms; and Zedonius, the Malevolent Ruler of Flame.

Ryu tracks Elizébet down to South America, where she offers the Demon Statue to Infernal High Priest Dagra Dai, in order to resurrect the ancient Archfiend, Vazdah. Elizébet duels with Ryu and he defeats her, but Elizébet proclaims her return. An overlooking Genshin explains that the fiends are looking to resurrect the Archfiend who is supposed to emerge from Mount Fuji back in Japan. The mountain is also the place which bound both the Black Spider Clan and The Dragon Lineage. Ryu returns home, cautioning Sonia not to follow him.

As Ryu overlooks the fire-brimming Mount Fuji, Ayane enters with the Eye of the Dragon, a gift from Joe Hayabusa, and Ryu equips the relic onto his Dragon Sword, forming the True Dragon Sword again. Heading to the mountain's summit, Ryu finds Genshin waiting for him at the crater's entrance. As Mount Fuji erupts, Genshin reveals to Ryu that he never cared for "tantrums of the archfiend" and that their moment has finally arrived. The two ninjas fight to the death before Genshin falls dead and Ryu leaps into Mount Fuji. Elizébet appears over a deceased Genshin looking to revive him as a fiend as Ryu descends into Mount Fuji.

Ryu fights past hordes of Fiends and singlehandedly defeats Zedonius, Volf, and Alexei, and rescues a captured Sonia. He instructs her to stay put and to not move. Ryu heads into another room and finds a resurrected Genshin, transformed into a Fiend, back for a fourth and final battle. The two ninja battle in another arduous battle ending with Ryu eventually cutting Genshin down, even splitting his face armor doing so. Genshin and Ryu, though mortal adversaries, share a final mutual respect as ninja in Genshin's dying moment. Genshin shares with Ryu that all of his actions were meant to strengthen the Black Spider Clan as a whole (his cause all along) and has no regrets of pursuing that. He acknowledges Ryu as a great warrior, and in support of Ryu's cause hands him the cursed Blade of the Archfiend for use before dying. A furious Elizébet appears, and chastises the Black Spider Ninja for losing, even with his power. Ryu attacks Elizébet, and angrily cuts her down to red dust with the combination of his own dragon sword and Genshin's Blade of the Archfiend. He states that the overlord had more to live for than she ever would.

Traveling deeper into the Underworld, Ryu confronts Dagra Dai, who is nearly finished with the Archfiend's resurrection, and defeats him. As a last resort, the Infernal High Priest offers his life to Vazdah, and the Archfiend is reborn. Ryu takes down the monstrosity and heads to the surface with Sonia, but a drop of his blood from an open wound accidentally spills onto the fiend and revitalizes Vazdah, who ascends to the summit in its true form. Amidst an erupting Mount Fuji, Ryu squares off with the Archfiend in a climatic duel to decide humanity's fate and wins. Sonia and Ryu reunite and climb to the top of the mountain, sharing the sunrise together.

In a post-credits scene, amongst a field with countless number of blades embedded into the ground, Ryu plants Genshin's Blade of the Archfiend into the ground and bows in respect for the Black Spider Overlord. Ryu takes one last look before taking off into the fog. The plot is continued in Ninja Gaiden 3 and its expansion Razor's Edge.

== Development and release ==
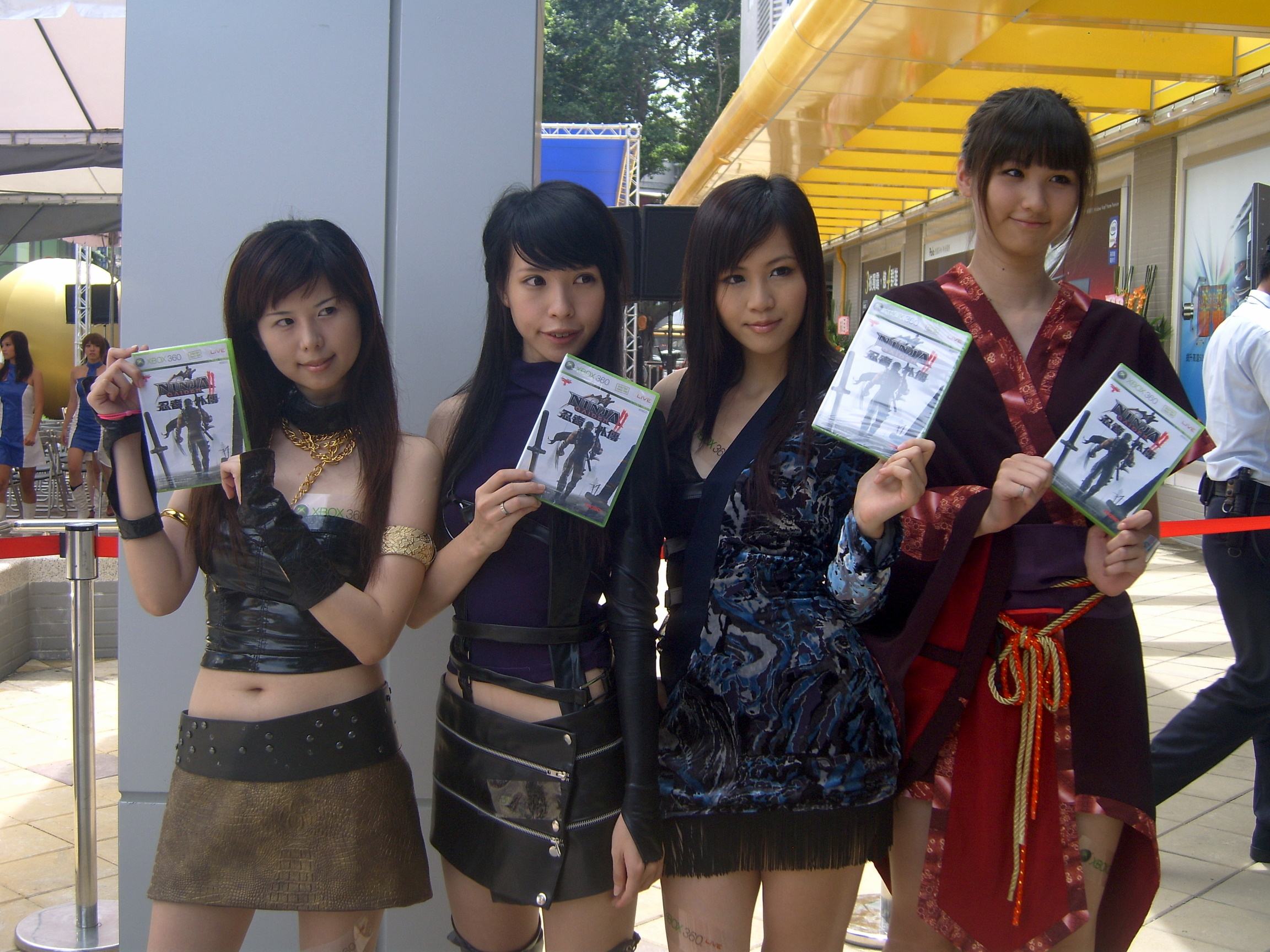
Promotion of Ninja Gaiden II at the Guang Hua Digital Plaza, Taiwan

Initial screenshots of Ninja Gaiden II leaked on the Japanese official Xbox 360 website but were removed within a matter of hours on 11 September 2007. A day later, on 12 September 2007, Microsoft held a Press Conference to the Tokyo Game Show 2007, which confirmed the game's existence, and where it was confirmed as an Xbox 360 exclusive. Game director Tomonobu Itagaki was quoted during the event as saying, "Now please enjoy the world's best action game, running on the world's best hardware." 8 days later, on 20 September, Ninja Gaiden II was officially shown at the Tokyo Game Show 2007 with the first released trailer. The localization was overseen by Team Ninja member Andrew Szymanski, in collaboration with AltJapan Co., Ltd.

A Ninja Gaiden II game demo was released on the Xbox Live in Japan on 31 May 2008, and in Europe and the United States on 8 June 2008. The game has not been released in Germany due to lack of a USK rating. An altered version titled Ninja Gaiden Sigma 2 was released for the PlayStation 3 in 2009 and for the PlayStation Vita in 2013.

=== Availability ===
In an interview with IGN leading up to the release of the Ninja Gaiden: Master Collection in 2021, which includes the Sigma versions of the first two titles, the head of Team Ninja Fumihiko Yasuda mentioned that the developer was "unable to salvage" the source code from the original games on Xbox platforms. For that reason, as well as the additional modes and costumes in later ports, Team Ninja did not have any plans of remastering Ninja Gaiden Black or Ninja Gaiden II.

An Unreal Engine 5 remaster of Ninja Gaiden Sigma 2, titled Ninja Gaiden 2 Black, was later developed in order to give players "something closer to the original Ninja Gaiden 2". It reverted to the original upgrade system and level of violence, increased the enemy count, and removed some of Sigma 2's bosses and modes. The game was announced and released on 23 January 2025 for PlayStation 5, Windows and Xbox Series X/S.

== Reception ==
Reception

Aggregate score
Aggregator	Score
Metacritic	81/100

Review scores
Publication	Score
1Up.com	B−
The A.V. Club	B−
Destructoid	8/10
Eurogamer	7/10
Famitsu	(360) 36/40; 34/40
Game Informer	8.75/10
GameDaily	9/10
GameRevolution	B
GameSpot	8/10
GameSpy	4.5/5
GameTrailers	8.4/10
Hardcore Gamer	4.25/5
IGN	(US) 8.7/10 (AU) 8/10
Official Xbox Magazine (US)	8.5/10
Wired	6/10

Ninja Gaiden II received "generally favorable reviews" according to the review aggregation website Metacritic. In Japan, Famitsu gave it a score of two nines and two eights for a total of 34 out of 40, while Famitsu X360 gave it a score of one 10, one nine, one eight, and one nine for a total of 36 out of 40.

GameZone gave it 8.8 out of 10, calling it: "One of the must-play action games of the year." Edge gave the game eight out of ten, calling it "a fascinating and hugely replayable game that shows Team Ninja has a gift beyond the vast majority of developers in that genre." GamePro called it "a slick and thrill packed action game but it's nowhere near the masterpiece that fans have been clamoring for. It's worth playing through and you'll have plenty of fun but finicky camera and uneven difficulty definitely cuts into the fun." (Note: GamePro gave the game 4.75/5 for graphics, 3.5/5 for sound, 4.25/5 for control, and 3.75/5 for fun factor.)

GameSpot nominated it for the award of 'Least Improved Sequel' in its 2008 video game awards, which went to Dynasty Warriors 6.

On 28 August 2008, Ninja Gaiden II was reported as having sold over one million units. As of December 2008, it sold 1.1 million units worldwide.
