= Ninja Gaiden 3: Razor's Edge =

2012 video game

- Developer: Team Ninja
- Publishers: Nintendo (Wii U); Tecmo Koei
- Directors: Fumihiko Yasuda; Hidehiko Nakajima
- Producers: Yosuke Hayashi; Takanori Goshima
- Designers: Motoi Tanahashi; Hiroyuki Nishi; Makoto Ishizuka
- Programmers: Shuhei Shiota; Shuhei Sato
- Artists: Masahiro Nose; Kenichiro Nakajo; Nozomu Sugiyama
- Writer: Masato Kato
- Composers: Takumi Saito; Ryo Koike; Hiroaki Takahashi
- Series: Ninja Gaiden
- Platforms: Wii U; PlayStation 3; Xbox 360; Nintendo Switch; PlayStation 4; Windows; Xbox One
- Release: November 18, 2012: Wii U; NA: November 18, 2012; JP: December 8, 2012; EU: January 11, 2013; AU: May 11, 2013 PlayStation 3, Xbox 360; NA: April 2, 2013; JP: April 4, 2013; EU: April 5, 2013; AU: April 11, 2013 Nintendo Switch, PlayStation 4, Windows, Xbox One; WW: June 10, 2021
- Genres: Action-adventure, hack and slash
- Modes: Single-player, multiplayer

Ninja Gaiden 3: Razor's Edge (Note: Japanese: NINJA GAIDEN(ニンジャガイデン) 3 RAZOR'S EDGE(レイザーズエッジ), Hepburn: Ninja Gaiden Surī: Reizāzu Ejji) is a 2012 action-adventure game developed by Team Ninja and published by Nintendo. It was released for the Wii U from November 2012 to May 2013, and subsequently released by Tecmo Koei for the PlayStation 3 and Xbox 360 in April 2013. It is an enhanced port of Ninja Gaiden 3 that includes all downloadable content from the original title, as well as additional enhancements made to improve the game. The game can be considered an equivalent to the Ninja Gaiden Sigma games, as it makes several changes to the original title.

This version of the game was released for Nintendo Switch, PlayStation 4, Windows, and Xbox One, as part of the Ninja Gaiden: Master Collection on June 10, 2021.

== Gameplay ==
A promotional screenshot showing the cooperative gameplay mode with Ryu and Ayane

The players can now use the Wii U GamePad's unique touchscreen to select different weapons, perform Ninpo, view additional game information and more. Decapitation and dismemberment from previous titles return, and an optional mode with touchscreen controls similar to that of Dragon Sword was announced but is not available in the final game. Many gameplay elements from Ninja Gaiden 2 were borrowed and implemented in Razor's Edge, while some elements from the original Ninja Gaiden 3 were discarded or completely remade, such as Steel on Bone being a grab counter chain and no longer requiring button spam, and the Kunai Climbing being much faster and easier to perform. Many other gameplay mechanics from Ninja Gaiden II were implemented in Razor's Edge.

Additional features include new exclusive weapons such as the Lunar Staff, Kusarigama and Dual Katanas, improved AI, and new enemy types, new battle areas and alternative costumes. The "Karma Counter" from previous games was brought back, now with enhanced features and bonuses. An upgrade menu was implemented which allowed players to spend their Karma points to enhance their weapons, Ninpo spells, and character traits, such as health bar length and special moves.

The game features online cooperative gameplay mode, with new playable characters, such as the female ninja Ayane, was revealed in a preview of the game at the Nintendo of America Wii U press conference in New York. She has her own set of moves, similar to her Ninja Gaiden Sigma 2 iteration, with additional cutscenes produced for her added role. A new Chapter Challenge mode allows the player to control Ayane, as well as additional DLC characters Kasumi and Momiji, in any part of the game.

== Plot ==
The game stars the elite master ninja of the previous titles, Ryu Hayabusa. Like the original, the events of Razor's Edge takes place after the events of Ninja Gaiden II. This time around it also features a separate storyline for Ryu's kunoichi ally, Ayane, who stars in her own set of unique missions in Razor's Edge that involve the return of the Black Spider Clan.

== Development and release ==
The game was announced at E3 2011 as a launch title for the Wii U. Outside Japan, Razor's Edge was published by Nintendo, making it the company's third title to be rated M by the ESRB after previous titles Eternal Darkness: Sanity's Requiem and Geist. It was the first game to receive an R18+ classification in Australia after the rating was introduced in the country. Downloadable content includes both Kasumi (from the Dead or Alive series) and Momiji as playable characters, available for free. On February 6, 2013, Tecmo Koei Europe announced the game would be also released for the PlayStation 3 and Xbox 360.

== Reception ==
Reception

Aggregate score
Aggregator	Score
Metacritic	WIIU: 69/100; PS3: 67/100; X360: 70/100

Review scores
Publication	Score
Destructoid	WIIU: 5.5/10
Eurogamer	WIIU: 6/10
GameRevolution	WIIU: 4.0/5; PS3/X360: 4.0/5
GameSpot	WIIU: 6.0/10
GamesRadar+	WIIU: 2.5/5
IGN	WIIU: 7.6/10
Official Nintendo Magazine	WIIU: 75%
Official Xbox Magazine (US)	X360: 8.0/10
VideoGamer.com	WIIU: 6/10

The game received more positive reviews than its predecessor, but overall reception was still largely mixed or average. An early version of the game was well received by Mitch Dyer of IGN, who wrote that it makes "massive strides toward becoming the game Team Ninja clearly wishes it was on 360 and PS3 earlier this year. [Yosuke] Hayashi and his team clearly took the negative criticism and hardcore fan backlash to heart – and they deserve a second chance." IGN's review by Ryan McCaffrey stated "it's fantastic to see this kind of hardcore gamer's game on a Nintendo console – and at the Wii U's launch, no less – and you can forget much of what you may have heard about the original release of this game." On the other hand, Kevin VanOrd from GameSpot wrote: "It's harder and more varied than its original release, but Ninja Gaiden 3: Razor's Edge doesn't reach the greatness of its forebears." Likewise, Eurogamer's Martin Robinson wrote: "This is a better game than Ninja Gaiden 3, and one that does commendable things in atoning for Team Ninja's past sins - but sadly it's far from a brilliant one." James Stephanie Sterling from Destructoid gave it 5.5 out of 10, writing: "Nothing this Wii U release does can improve upon the core gameplay, which remains as dry, disaffected, and banausic as ever before. Razor's Edge gives us more, but when the original serving exceeded that which the player could stomach, 'more' isn't a very tasty prospect."
