= Ayane (Dead or Alive) =

Fictional character from Dead or Alive

- Dead or Alive and Ninja Gaiden character
- Ayane as she appears in Dead or Alive Ultimate (2004)
- First game: Dead or Alive (1998)
- Created by: Tomonobu Itagaki
- Designed by: Tomonobu Itagaki; Yutaka Saito (DOA5, DOA6); Yohei Shimbori (DOA6); Tomoko Nishii (NG4)
- Voiced by: English: Gina DeVettori (DOA2: Hardcore) Janna Levenstein (DOAX2, DOAP) Wendee Lee (DOAD) Brittney Lee Harvey (DOA5) Janice Kawaye (Ninja Gaiden, DOA6) Alma Sarai (Ninja Gaiden 4); Japanese: Wakana Yamazaki (DOA-NG4)
- Portrayed by: Natassia Malthe (film)

In-universe information
- Fighting style: Mugen Tenshin Ninjutsu (Hajin Mon style)
- Origin: Japan
- Nationality: Japanese

Ayane (/ɑːˈjɑːˌnɛ/; Japanese: あやね) is a character in the Dead or Alive and Ninja Gaiden franchises developed by Koei Tecmo's Team Ninja. She debuted as a hidden unlockable character in the PlayStation version of the fighting game Dead or Alive in 1998 and has since appeared in all of its sequels and series spin-offs. Ayane is the protagonist of Dead or Alive 3 and a supporting character in the Ninja Gaiden series, and has made multiple guest appearances in other games, in particular in the Warriors franchise and Fatal Frame: Maiden of Black Water.

Ayane is a teenage female ninja who was initially shunned by her clan during childhood due to her origin, but into adulthood became highly respected and skilled, assisting her older half-brother and current clan leader Hayate. She also has a complex relationship with her half-sister, Kasumi, a runaway ninja and the Dead or Alive series' protagonist. She has been voiced by several voice actresses including Wakana Yamazaki, Gina DeVettori, Janna Levenstein, Wendee Lee, Brittney Lee Harvey, and Janice Kawaye. She was portrayed in the film adaptation of the Dead or Alive franchise by Natassia Malthe.

Ayane has been regarded as a popular character by media outlets, though with mixed reactions to her personality. While some publications reacted negatively to this aspect, others have considered her an early example of character archetypes found in later Japanese media and a positive example of the Dead or Alive series' writing. Ayane's sex appeal has received significant praise, though critics have questioned its appropriateness due to her age and portrayal in promotional material. As the series has progressed, Koei Tecmo's attempts to reduce her sexualization, particularly in regards to the size of her breasts, have received backlash from fans and caused the developers to voice surprise and reverse such changes.

== Conception and creation ==
When developing the fighting game Dead or Alive for Koei Tecmo, Team Ninja considered several design concepts. Lead developer Tomonobu Itagaki wanted to emphasize character expression, taking inspiration from the wrestling group nWo. He found the ninja character concepts submitted by the design team to be the "coolest" and chose to apply the concept to the game's protagonist, Kasumi. While she was originally intended to be a "kuru kuru ninja" (a type of ninja that incorporates spinning movements into their behavior), Kasumi's characterization strayed from this concept as the project progressed. When developing the upgraded arcade version, Dead or Alive ++, the team decided to introduce the wrestling character Bass Armstrong. Itagaki felt it would be nice to take the opportunity to incorporate another ninja into the title, which prompted Ayane's creation.

While a basic version of Ayane was incorporated into the 1998 PlayStation port of Dead or Alive, the Dead or Alive++ arcade version was given an expanded moveset, using attacks they had originally planned for Kasumi. Itagaki said they had some trouble with the character concept due to the development team's technical capabilities. He added that finding "a balance between onset, duration, and rigidity, as well as the coolness of the motion" in how she attacks was particularly difficult because of the kuru kuru ninja aspect compared to Kasumi's more linear movement. He felt they reached a level of perfection with her in the game's sequel, Dead or Alive 2.

Though initially her attacks were weaker than other characters, the developers gradually balanced them to meet Itagaki's aim of a character that would have a psychological impact on players while fighting regardless of her strength. Ayane's background was also meant to have an impact on players as it focused on her having a hard upbringing. In Itagaki's view, both Kasumi and Ayane were representative of "many unhappy women who have been at the mercy of a male society" and felt this aspect to their portrayal gave them depth and importance. Instead of telling this explicitly within the game, he included a relationship chart with Dead or Alive so players would recognize the key details between each of the cast and imagine the rest. For Dead or Alive 3, she was given Lucha Libre attacks and maneuvers due to the development team's desire to include them somewhere amongst the game's fighting styles.

Ayane's personality is portrayed as a cold demeanor and "extremely serious", in contrast to Kasmui's "soft" personality. As Itagaki felt the latter's personality was symbolic of the Dead or Alive series, Ayane's was regarded as a better fit for the "very hard-edged" Ninja Gaiden series, including her in several of the series' titles as a result. The sentiment was shared by Koei Tecmo general manager Yosuke Hayashi, who stated that the image of Ayane "fighting while covered in blood symbolizes the intensity and sharpness" of the Ninja Gaiden games.

=== Designs ===
Ayane's outfits in the Ninja Gaiden series were designed to emphasize her butterfly motif. Koei Tecmo general manager Yosuke Hayashi said that the image of Ayane "fighting while covered in blood symbolizes the intensity and sharpness" of the games.

Standing 157 centimetres (5 ft 2 in) tall, Ayane is a teenage Japanese woman with red eyes and measurements of 93-54-84 cm (37-22-33 in). She has purple hair extending to her neck, with bangs in the front. Several designs were considered during development, including a biker style outfit as well as various ensembles with short skirts and a top that exposed her chest. The finalized design, dubbed her "ribbon outfit", features a dark blue strapless miniskirt dress with a butterfly imprint and an orange trim that exposes portions of her body: shoulders, cleavage, and part of her right thigh. Additionally, the outfit had matching flowing sleeves, stockings, and high heel boots, while a headband wraps across her brow, with a ribbon tied to the left side of it. An orange sash surrounds her waist, tied into a large bow on her back. After the outfit was decided, the development team spent additional time adjusting the color scheme.

In terms of physical appearance, the developers wanted to counter the then-perception that it was impossible to "create beautiful girls in 3D", with Itagaki aiming to create "Digital Venus" designs that would be popular on media character rankings. To this end, particular emphasis was placed on the size and movement of the cast's breasts, in part due to the development team's own preference and what they perceived as a "breast boom" in Japan—an increase in average bust sizes across the nation—at the time. Due to Ayane's original outfit exposing her shoulders, Itagaki gave their animation and movement particular attention. He described the process as "trial and error" and was not satisfied with the results until three days before the game's release deadline.

With Dead or Alive 3, her primary attire was changed to a black ninja outfit that covered more of her body, while exuding a "somber tone". Itagaki preferred it, in part due to his uncertainty towards implementing original ideas with her ribbon outfit. Regardless, the ribbon outfit has appeared in other Koei Tecmo games as a clothing option. In addition to these, Ayane has had a multitude of outfits throughout the franchise including swimsuits, schoolgirl clothes, and other variations of ninja attire. Many designs, such as her appearance in the Ninja Gaiden series, have integrated a butterfly design into the outfit.

Later installments in the series have seen other designers contribute to her design. For Dead or Alive 6, her default outfit was changed to have a hooded ninja theme, a concept that art director Yukata Saito had been considering since 5. Designed by game director Yohei Shimbori, they felt the outfit resembled her Ninja Gaiden attire, and with a white shirt added to give her a more natural look conveyed a "stylish, yet mysterious character". For Ninja Gaiden 4, her design was handled by Tomoko Nishii of PlatinumGames. Here, it was changed to a black and tan semi-transparent outfit with red knee-high boots, an upside-down triangle cutout on the front showing the undersides of her breasts, fingerless gloves, and a dark blue jacket that extend to the elbow. The outfit was intended to reflect the futuristic cyberpunk atmosphere of the game, but also incorporated butterflies and ribbons to show her affinity for "cute" elements. Additionally her hairstyle was lengthened while retaining her bangs, to illustrate her fondness for beauty treatments.

Several times across the series, changes to Ayane's appearance and aesthetics have been met with considerable pushback from players. For her appearance in Ninja Gaiden Sigma 2, they made her face appear older. After receiving backlash from fans, the change was reverted; however, a similar change later in the Dead or Alive series was met with less resistance. For Dead or Alive 5, Koei Tecmo general manager Yosuke Hayashi reduced Ayane's breast size and the amount they jiggle in order to present the game as more "mature", stating that the characters were "no longer content to be eye candy". Players again objected, with Shimbori stating the development team was surprised when fans requested her breasts to be bigger instead, and the change was undone.

== Appearances ==
=== In Dead or Alive and Ninja Gaiden ===
Ayane is a Japanese female ninja introduced in the video game Dead or Alive. Raised by one of her ninja clan leaders, Genra, she is treated as an outcast with her only friend being series protagonist Kasumi. She later discovers she is the daughter of series villain Raidou, who raped the mother of Kasumi and her brother Hayate, making the pair her half-siblings. Angered this information was withheld from her, Ayane turns her aggression towards her half-sister, who she saw as living the exact opposite life she had. When Kasumi leaves the clan's village, Genra orders Ayane to hunt her down. She continues this mission into the game's later sequels, but in Dead or Alive 3, discovers that Genra was captured by the corporation DOATEC who had turned him into a superhuman puppet. She ultimately kills her foster father to end his misery. In Dead or Alive 4, she helps bring down DOATEC by destroying their complex. Later in Dead or Alive 6, she fights alongside Kasumi and Hayate to defeat a revived Raidou.

Outside the main series, Ayane appears in all of the spin-off Dead or Alive Xtreme Beach Volleyball titles. Dead or Alive: Code Chronus, a prequel project about Kasumi's and Ayane's backstory, was intended for release but cancelled when Itagaki left Tecmo. In all appearances, Ayane is voiced by Wakana Yamazaki in Japanese. She has been voiced by a variety of actresses in English, including Gina DeVettori for Dead or Alive 2, Janna Levenstein for Dead or Alive Xtreme Beach Volleyball 2 up to Dead or Alive Paradise, Wendee Lee for Dead or Alive: Dimensions, Brittney Lee Harvey for Dead or Alive 5, and Janice Kawaye for Dead or Alive 6.

In the Ninja Gaiden series, she first appears in a minor role in the 2004 video game, and in Ninja Gaiden Black she asserts herself as protagonist Ryu Hayabusa's master in the game's "Ninja Dog" mode. In later games, such as Ninja Gaiden Sigma 2 and Ninja Gaiden 3: Razor's Edge, she is available as a playable character, with the latter adding exclusive single-player chapters in the game. In tie-in games for the series, she is featured in Zen Pinball: Ninja Gaiden Sigma 2 and in the 2013 mobile action card game Hyakuman-nin no Ninja Gaiden. This representation of Ayane has character has appeared in several other Koei Tecmo games, including Warriors Orochi 2, Shin Sangoku Musou VS, Warriors All-Stars, Dynasty Warriors: Strikeforce, and Warriors Abyss, while parts of her Ninja Gaiden Sigma 2 costume were released as downloadable content for Dynasty Warriors Online. In Japanese, Ayane is voiced again by Wakana Yamazaki in all Ninja Gaiden appearances, while Janice Kawaye voices her throughout the series in English.

=== In other games and media ===
She has also appeared in other Koei Tecmo titles, such as the strategy game Romance of the Three Kingdoms XIV where she was included as a playable character alongside others from Dead or Alive. The survival horror game Fatal Frame: Maiden of Black Water features Ayane in her own side story mission, which focuses on her trying to find a missing girl. Ayane's inclusion in the title was at the suggestion of Nintendo, and the developers spent significant time adjusting the model, particularly the wobble of her breasts, based on Team Ninja's feedback. In non-Koei Tecmo produced titles, she was included in Marvelous Entertainment's fighting games Senran Kagura: Estival Versus and Senran Kagura: Peach Beach Splash, as well as the follow up title Shinobi Master Senran Kagura: New Link produced by Honey Parade Games. In mobile titles, she was added to Shift Up's Destiny's Child as a playable character as part of a collaboration event between Koei Tecmo and Shift Up in 2020.

In other media, Ayane appears in several stories in the gag comic series Dead or Alive 2 Comic Anthology by DNA Media Comics. She was also featured in the live-action film DOA: Dead or Alive, where instead of being Kasumi's sibling she is her former servant and holds romantic feelings for Hayate. Dedicated to killing Kasumi, Ayane confronts her several times on the island. She later aids Hayate against DOATEC. In the film, Ayane was portrayed by actress Natassia Malthe, who went through "weeks of martial arts training in China" for the film. Tomonobu Itagaki later said he "wanted to have Japanese actresses portray Kasumi and Ayane," but the film's director Corey Yuen "believed strongly in his casting choices." Afterward, the film's producer Mark A. Altman said that he "was such a fan" of Malthe being "threatening and enigmatic as Ayane" that he cast her in his later film Dead and Deader.

== Promotion and merchandise ==
Ayane has been featured on multiple figurines by various companies such as Kotobukiya, Multiverse Studio, Mr Big, Sega, Volks, and Kaiyodo's Revoltech brand. Other merchandise has included wall scrolls, dakimakura pillow cases, trading cards, credit card designs, women's swimwear, and a Dead or Alive talking clock that was bundled with another figure of either Ayane or Kasumi. In other games, cosmetic items based on Ayane were released for the massively multiplayer online game Phantasy Star Online 2.

Ayane has been the subject of advertisements based around her sex appeal, such as banners promoting Xtreme 2 that emphasized the visibility of her nipples through her swimwear. An image of her in a swimsuit appeared in Playboy magazine as part of their "Girls of Gaming" series. Meanwhile, advertisements for Ninja Gaiden 2 focused on being able to use the PlayStation's sixaxis controller to move the breasts in-game, while another used a wall fixture in Japan that had silicone facsimiles of her chest protruding from the wall, with a camera recording people groping and caressing the "breasts" as they passed by. Several items have been marketed with emphasis on her breasts, such as "3D" coffee mugs and 3D mousepads, with a life-sized variant of the latter also produced.

== Critical reception ==
Reception for Ayane has been mixed. Gen Gamachi of the Japanese website Inside Games discussed her "appearance and excellent style" in both the Dead or Alive and Ninja Gaiden series, feeling that both helped make her popular. He described her as a "quiet, cool beauty" with a strong sense of responsibility. Outlets have praised her sex appeal, such as Dengeki Online, Kakuchopurei, and Dreamcast Magazine, with the last adding that the series' clothing options increased her appeal, though called her gameplay "irritating". Mike Fahey of Kotaku approved of the toned down breast physics in Dead or Alive 5, stating she now looked more like a martial artist and less like a young woman "who only studied martial arts when she wasn't recovering from cosmetic surgery".

Commentary was also made regarding her personality. Raymond Padilla of GameSpy stated he originally saw Ayane as an "uptight bitch with a massive chip on her shoulder". However, upon seeing her story which covered her upbringing and the root of her feud with Kasumi, he came to like the character significantly more and cited it as an example of how good writing in fighting games helped make them more enjoyable. Dengeki Online staff writer "Masked Imaichi" stated that while characters with tsundere and kuudere had become more common since her debut, he felt her personality was a novel concept at the time. He added that "she was a little tough, but with her cute face, she struck a chord with my heart" and he found her more appealing as the series progressed. The staff of website Kakuchopurei, however, were more critical, describing her as "just a Terminator archetype who’s dressed to kill", and complained about her "literal child-like demeanor".

The staff of Chinese website Games.sina.com.cn wrote that upon her debut, Ayane's "icy demeanor" and purple hair color quickly drew the attention of players and helped make her a popular character. When discussing her movements, they stated they were "inferior to Kasumi in terms of elegance and noise" but highlighted her petite and attractive figure. The staff additionally pointed out the significance of purple in her primary color scheme, noting the color was often believed to have a healing effect, especially "a healing light for people with hurt hearts". They stated it tied well into her backstory and personal traumas, especially as her character became more open as the series progressed. Additional praise was given to voice actress Wakana Yamazaki, stating that while some fans saw her delivery as having a "lack of presence" and giving a weak impression, in their eyes it naturally fit the image of a lonely ninja. The staff summarized by calling her a perfect fit.

Zenji Nishikawa of Famitsu described her portrayal in Venus Vacation as having a high sense of pride, and while she was condescending towards the player, her personality came across more as a tsundere archetype with sadistic tendencies he found gave her significant appeal. He enjoyed her moments with Kasumi in the title, and how while she initially looked negatively towards the player over time as she interacted with others she regarded him more warmly. He also praised her beauty salon scene in the game as "one of the sexiest scenes in the series", and enjoyed that while she expressed annoyance if pranked or encouraged to act provocative in the game, she still went along with the actions.

=== Criticism regarding age and sexualization ===
In early Dead or Alive titles, Ayane was one of three characters whose in-universe age was stated to be under 18, a detail that Tecmo omitted from Western releases of the games. However, this caused issues in countries such as Sweden, particularly with Dead or Alive: Dimensions due to allegations of the game portraying underage characters in "pornographic situations". Kakuchopurei's staff in their earlier mention of her also acknowledged her underage status, expressing gratitude that she was made older in Dead or Alive 6, but said that the unease of "her previous incarnations with the skimpiest kunoichi outfits made for Japan strip clubs" lingered in their minds.

Writing for Destructoid, James Stephanie Sterling addressed the matter in her own commentary, jokingly stating they felt like a "pedophile" when discussing Ayane and her "huge busters" with a Tecmo representative at E3 regarding Ninja Gaiden Sigma 2. She further criticized Tecmo for caving in to player demand regarding Ayane's face, as she felt its "child-like" appearance only compounded the issue. In an article for GameFront, Sterling further called Ayane's young age coupled with her sexualization an "obsession with youth", a perceived aspect in Japan she found particularly disturbing. She questioned if it was important know that "the girl with gigantic tits" was a teenager, though added that even if her age was increased Ayane would still "look like a creepy, big-breasted infant". Sterling also called out the sixaxis gimmick of moving her breasts with the controller, feeling the way it was advertised encouraged players to "Buy our game, and manipulate the jugs on this big-eyed lump of grade-A jailbait."

Ayane's use in promotional material also drew criticism, with Hyper magazine staff questioning the appropriateness of her Playboy appearance and expressing concern that such promotions could give ammunition to those critical of video games. Joe Newman of GamesRadar+ heavily criticized the Ninja Gaiden ad campaigns, feeling both were out of place with not only the tone of the game but also her character, particularly for her role as a ninja. He further emphasized it followed a trend of Tecmo using such material to promote their games, which he believed suggested the developers lacked confidence in their works.

== See also ==
- Ninja in popular culture
