= Ninja Gaiden Sigma 2 =

2009 video game

- North American PS3 cover art
- Developer: Team Ninja
- Publisher: Tecmo Koei
- Director: Yosuke Hayashi
- Producer: Yosuke Hayashi
- Programmers: Yasunori Sakuda; Masanao Kimura; Takanori Goshima
- Artists: Masahiro Nose; Hirohisa Kaneko; Mariko Hirokane
- Composers: Hiroyuki Akiyama; Ryo Koike; Takumi Saito
- Series: Ninja Gaiden
- Engine: Hybrid Engine
- Platforms: PlayStation 3; PlayStation Vita; Nintendo Switch; PlayStation 4; Windows; Xbox One
- Release: PlayStation 3: NA: September 29, 2009; JP: October 1, 2009; EU: October 2, 2009; AU: October 8, 2009; PlayStation Vita: NA: February 26, 2013; JP: February 28, 2013; EU: March 1, 2013; AU: March 7, 2013; Switch, PS4, Windows, Xbox One: WW: June 10, 2021
- Genres: Action-adventure, hack and slash
- Modes: Single-player, multiplayer

Ninja Gaiden Sigma 2, stylized as Ninja Gaiden Σ2, is a 2009 action-adventure game developed by Team Ninja and published by Tecmo Koei for the PlayStation 3. It is a port of the 2008 Xbox 360 video game Ninja Gaiden II. It includes the entirety of the original story mode as well as various changes to the game's design, along with updated textures and a 720p resolution. The game changes Ninja Gaiden II in a similar, but not identical way to how Ninja Gaiden Sigma changed the original Ninja Gaiden. A port for the PlayStation Vita, titled Ninja Gaiden Sigma 2 Plus (Ninja Gaiden Σ2+), was released in 2013.

Ninja Gaiden Sigma 2 was released for the Microsoft Windows, Nintendo Switch, PlayStation 4, and Xbox One as part of the Ninja Gaiden: Master Collection on June 10, 2021. An Unreal Engine 5 remaster that blends more aspects from the original game with Sigma 2, titled Ninja Gaiden 2 Black, was announced and released for PlayStation 5, Windows and Xbox Series X/S on January 23, 2025.

== Gameplay ==
Cooperative gameplay in Ninja Gaiden Sigma 2, featuring Rachel and Ayane

In comparison to the original version of Ninja Gaiden II, the game features new large-scale bosses, an online co-operative gameplay mode with three new playable characters (Ayane, Momiji, Rachel) and the PlayStation Network Trophy support. Unlike the first game, the Sixaxis motion sensing of the PlayStation 3 controller was not used for "charging" the Ninpo magic, but instead utilized as a secret way to jiggle the breasts of female characters.

While Sigma 2 has additional content not in the original Ninja Gaiden II, a large amount of content was also removed from the game, or altered, such as a drastically reduced enemy count within gameplay. With Team Mission mode, where two players can play at once in cooperative gameplay, the second character will be CPU-controller partner if there is no human partner or the player is offline. In Story mode, Karma Scoring is removed and now only done in Chapter Challenge. Tests of Valor were also removed, scattering the rewards across Ryu's chapters.

In the gameplay control system, the action button changed from RB/R1 to circle, circle is now also the shuriken button. Other ranged weapons were separated to the R2 button. This allowed both the Bow/Cannon to be equipped at the same time as the shuriken. The player cannot unequip the bow or cannon. Thus, the two weapons bulk up Ryu's appearance even though they do not appear in cutscenes. Keys were completely removed. Doors simply pop open now. Now (R1) tells the player where to go. Projectile spam was greatly reduced from NGII. Healing items were increased and are the only thing one can buy. Most chests now contain yellow, blue, or red essence. Players no longer can hold onto Life of the Gods, Lives of Thousand Gods, or Spirit of the Devil; instead, they are automatically consumed upon pickup.

Changes were made to Ryu's weapons. Enma's Fang, a greatsword, was added as a new melee weapon. The Incendiary Shuriken were removed for two reasons, opening paths and their power due to the removal of the ammo count, and is instead Ayane's main projectile weapon. The Fiend's Bane Bow, now with unlimited ammo, had its Ultimate Technique removed. The Howling Cannon, a heavy cannon with a slow projectile speed, served as a replacement. Additional removed weapons include the Windmill Shuriken and the Harpoon Gatling Gun. The Weapon Upgrade system was also altered to restrict upgrades, allowing only one upgrade at a time per shop. In addition, weapons can only be upgraded at shops where a blue flame is lit; items can be bought in both types of the shop.

Enemies' health was raised to compensate fewer enemies appearing on screen. Five new bosses were added, replacing two old boss encounters. There is one new boss for each alternate character's chapter (including returning bosses from Ninja Gaiden: Dragon Sword and the 2004 Ninja Gaiden), a Dragon to replace the double Quetzalcoatl fight (though Quetzalcoatl can still be fought alone as in Ninja Gaiden II), and two giant statues: a giant Buddha Statue and a Statue of Liberty animated by Alexei. The Tunnel Worm was omitted, causing Ryu to fall through a tunnel leading from dark night to bright day. Most flying enemies were removed due to infinite ammo.

Finally, almost all the gore has been removed in the PlayStation 3 version. Purple mist now bursts from enemies, along with reduced blood splashes. Dismembered body parts no longer stay on the ground, but vanish. Additionally, cinematics have been altered to remove dismemberment, dissection and blood effects. In the Japanese version of Sigma 2 the player can only decapitate monsters and non-humans; even the pause menu and game over screens are colored blue instead of red to reflect this change.

The Sigma 2 Plus version for the PlayStation Vita, however, restored all the gore with the exception of the Japanese version. Its exclusive features are Ninja Race and Tag Missions.

== Plot ==
The game's plot is based on that in Ninja Gaiden II. Exclusive to the Sigma version of the game are three new chapters starring three alternate playable characters: Ayane (a kunoichi from the Mugen Tenshin ninja clan, a friendly clan who helps Ryu, originally from the Dead or Alive series), Momiji (a female member of the Hayabusa clan who uses a naginata and was introduced in Ninja Gaiden: Dragon Sword) and Rachel (a Fiend hunter from the Holy Vigoor Empire who is in possession of the "Fiend's Blood" curse and first appeared in the 2004's Ninja Gaiden).

== Development and release ==
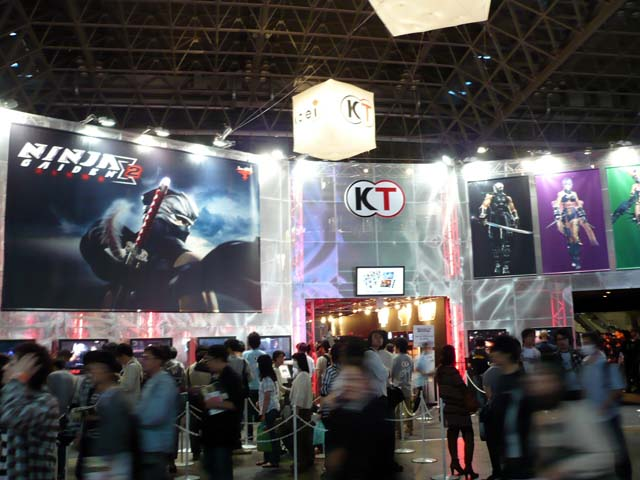
Ninja Gaiden Sigma 2 at TGS 2009

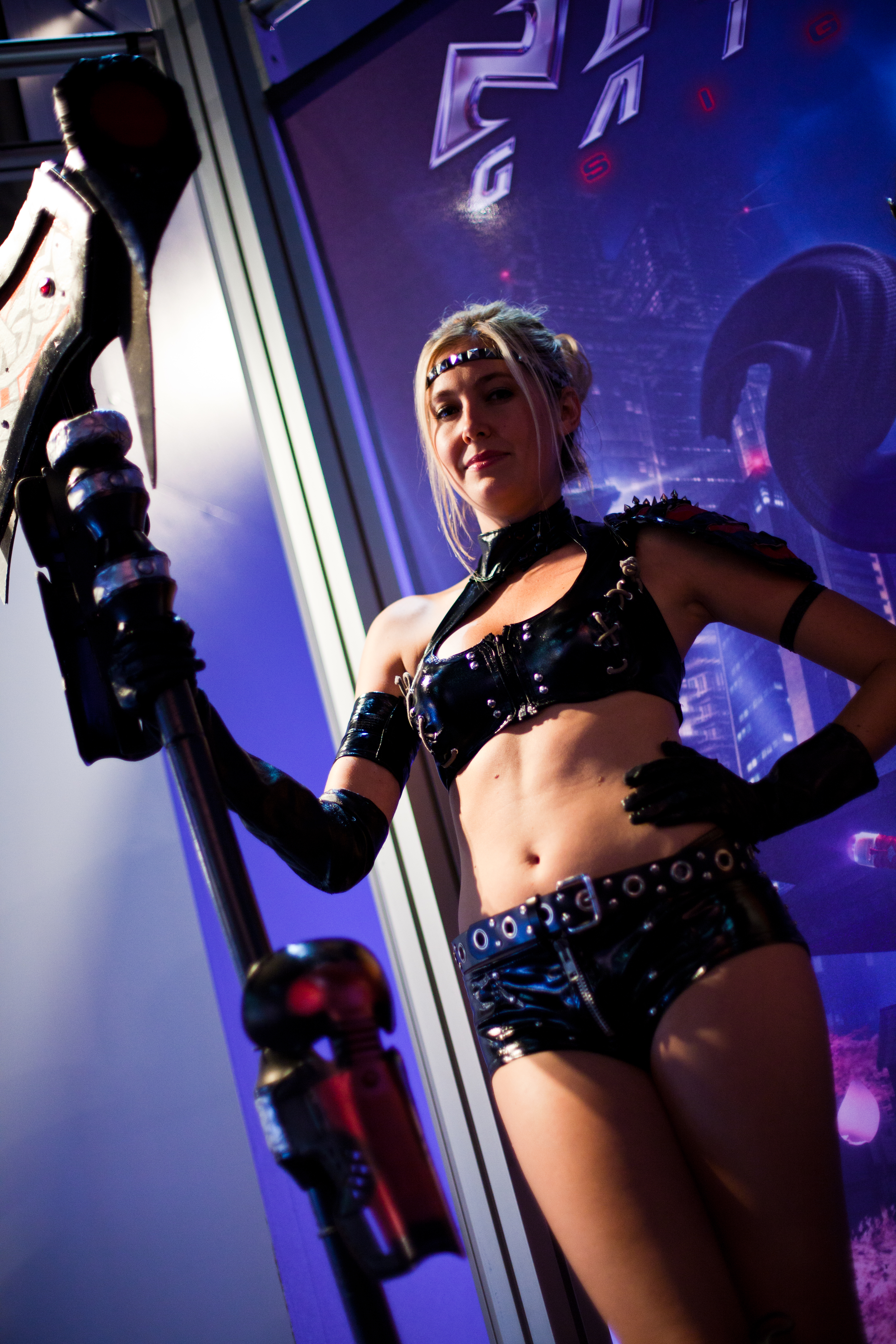
A promotional model of Rachel at E3 2009

Though Team Ninja developed the title, the series' creator Tomonobu Itagaki did not design it, as he left Team Ninja after completing Ninja Gaiden II. Yosuke Hayashi, director of Ninja Gaiden Sigma, produced and directed NGS2. Hayashi as the new director of Team Ninja had the game ported from its original Xbox 360 engine to the engine used to create Ninja Gaiden Sigma. The game's native resolution became 720p, compared to the original 585p in the original Xbox 360 version, with an increased use of bloom lighting effect. Eurogamer commented that the game "has the visual edge, not just thanks to its massively increased resolution but also through the accomplished use of the RSX's pixel shaders."

As a trade off for increased resolution, the amount of on-screen action has been reduced in the PS3 version to keep the game running at an acceptable speed. Eurogamer pointed out that there are fewer enemies spawned at one time in the PS3 version of the game, and the developers "blatantly remove polygons in the Sigma edition in order to maintain frame-rate." Also of note is the reduction of bloodshed and gore-related violence than the Xbox 360 version. Sprays of blood have been replaced by purple mist, and dead enemies and severed limbs will vanish from the battlefield "almost instantly" after killing an enemy. Hayashi had many textures replaced to vastly improve the visual appeal of each environment, but left most character textures unchanged.

Those who purchased the Collector's Edition of Ninja Gaiden Sigma 2 were treated to a comic version of the prologue, titled The Vampire War, and the original soundtrack. The Collector's Edition was limited to GameStop in North America and HMV for the UK. Pre-ordering either edition at GameStop warranted a code for a special Sigma 2 costume, mildly resembling Joe Hayabusa's own outfit, which that costume along with others can be purchased from the PlayStation Store.

== Reception ==
Reception

Aggregate score
Aggregator	Score
Metacritic	PS3: 83/100; Vita: 66/100

Review scores
Publication	Score
Destructoid	7.5/10 (Plus) 5.5/10
Eurogamer	8/10
Game Informer	8.5/10
GameRevolution	(Plus) 7/10
GamesRadar+	4.5/5
IGN	8.4/10 (Plus) 6/10
Push Square	9/10
VideoGamer.com	9/10

Ninja Gaiden Σ 2 has an overall Metacritic rating of 83/100. The game received an 8.4 from IGN and an 8.5 from Game Informer. In 2012, ScrewAttack included it on their 2012 list of top ten "games that make you want to bone".

== Ninja Gaiden 2 Black ==
Ninja Gaiden 2 Black
- Developer: Team Ninja
- Publisher: Koei Tecmo
- Director: Shuhei Sato
- Programmer: Fumihiko Yasuda
- Engine: Unreal Engine 5
- Platforms: PlayStation 5; Windows; Xbox Series X/S
- Release: January 23, 2025
- Genres: Action-adventure, hack and slash
- Mode: Single-player

Following the reveal of Ninja Gaiden 4 during the Xbox Developer Direct on January 23, 2025, Team Ninja and Koei Tecmo announced that an Unreal Engine 5 remaster, titled Ninja Gaiden 2 Black will launch later that day for PlayStation 5, Windows, Xbox Series X/S and Xbox Game Pass. Calling it "a definitive version" of Ninja Gaiden II in the vein of the original Ninja Gaiden Black, producer Fumihiko Yasuda explained that the idea came from feedback during the release of Ninja Gaiden: Master Collection in 2021, as many fans wanted to experience something closer to the original Xbox 360 game.

The game aims to replicate the feel of the original Ninja Gaiden II by incorporating its upgrade system and restoring its level of blood and dismemberment. The enemy count was also increased, though not to the extent of the Xbox 360 version. As the remaster was built using Sigma 2 code, it retains most of its changes and additions, such as playable Ayane, Rachel and Momiji, costumes, Tag Missions, and the Black Dragon boss, but removes the Great Buddha and Statue of Liberty bosses, as well as the "Ninja Race" mode. The "Test of Valor" challenges, Mission Mode DLC and the Giant Death Worm boss fight that were removed in Sigma 2 are still absent in Ninja Gaiden 2 Black. A New Game Plus mode was also added in a post-launch update.

=== Reception ===
Reception

Aggregate scores
Aggregator	Score
Metacritic	(PC) 81/100 (Note: Score based on 7 reviews) (PS5) 80/100 (Note: Score based on 5 reviews) (XSX) 81/100 (Note: Score based on 6 reviews)
OpenCritic	93% Recommend (Note: Score based on 16 reviews)

Ninja Gaiden 2 Black also received "generally favorable" reviews on Metacritic, while 93% of critics recommended the game on OpenCritic. They liked the game's visual upgrade, while noting somewhat dated controls and animations due to being an enhanced remaster rather than a full remake. They felt it was a great starting point for beginners, as well as a fitting release to supplement the upcoming Ninja Gaiden 4. Some lamented that it still lacked elements from the original release, though it was considered to be an overall improvement from Sigma 2.
