= List of Case Closed TV specials and OVAs =

The cover of the first DVD compilation for the Shōnen Sunday Original Animation of the Detective Conan series released by Shogakukan

The Case Closed anime, known as Meitantei Conan (名探偵コナン, lit. Great Detective Conan, officially translated as Detective Conan) in Japan, had spun off ten television specials and twelve original video animation series since its debut on January 8, 1996, on Nippon Television Network System (NNS) in Japan. The anime special features its own original plot with the general theme focused on Shinichi Kudo who was turned into a child by a poison called APTX 4869, but continues working as a detective under the alias Conan Edogawa.

The Shōnen Sunday Original Animation series is a Case Closed original video animation series which is released directly to VHS and DVD. The OVA was available to order for those who were subscribed to Weekly Shōnen Sunday. Shōnen Sunday has released a new OVA yearly since 2000 with nine animations released as of March 2010. Shogakukan later collected the nine animations and released them into four DVD compilations with the title Secret Files.

The Magic Files is a second Case Closed original video animation series, which is released directly to DVD. A new Magic File has been released every year in April since the first on April 11, 2007, which contained four previously aired Case Closed episodes. Later Magic Files were released along with Case Closed films, containing an original plot with background ties to the theatrical Case Closed films. The sixth Magic File was released on April 14, 2012.

== TV specials ==
No.	Title	Original release date
1	"Time Travel of the Silver Sky"; Transliteration: "Gin'yoku no Taimu Toraberu" (Japanese: 銀翼のタイムトラベル)	April 10, 2004
Professor Agasa has created a computer program that can give you the identity of anyone in the world. He decides to use it to figure out who Kaitou Kid is. Before he does, the program gives him a history of the Kid, as well as preview clips of the eighth movie. It also tries to find out the boss' identity, but eventually failed because of his forbidden area. When he is about to finally figure out who Kid is, Kid appears on the computer screen, announcing he has hacked the program.
2	"Black History"; Transliteration: "Burakku Hisutorī Kuro-zukume no Soshiki to no Taiketsu no Rekishi" (Japanese: ブラックヒストリー 黒ずくめの組織との対決の歴史)	December 17, 2007
A recap of the Black Organization's actions so far, aired during an anime break the month before the Clash of Red and Black arc began.
3	"Lupin the 3rd vs. Detective Conan"; Transliteration: "Rupan Sansei Vāsasu Meitantei Konan" (Japanese: ルパン三世VS名探偵コナン)	March 27, 2009
The Queen of Vespania and her first born son are killed in a hunting accident, leaving behind her daughter, Princess Mira. Conan ends up protecting her after a failed attempt on her life. Coincidentally, the gentleman thief Lupin III happens to be there as well, in order to steal the Vespanian Crown. Later on, both Lupin and Conan realize that the deaths of the two royals may not have been an accident at all and must team up in order to solve the case and keep Mira safe.
4	"Fugitive: Kogoro Mori"; Transliteration: "Tōbōsha Mōri Kogorō" (Japanese: 逃亡者･毛利小五郎)	April 23, 2014 (cellphone); January 3, 2015 (TV)
A previously unadapted manga case. Kogoro says he's being chased by someone. He tells Azusa to not tell anybody where he is but her mouth slip and the chase begins. He thinks of ways he can get away from these people who are after him.
5	"The Disappearance of Conan Edogawa: The Worst Two Days in History"; Transliteration: "Edogawa Conan Shissō Jiken ~ Shijō Saiaku no Futsukakan ~" (Japanese: 江戸川コナン失踪事件 ~史上最悪の二日間~)	December 26, 2014
After slipping and hitting his head in a bath house, Conan appears to have lost his memory.
6	"Detective Conan Episode "ONE" - The Great Detective Turned Small"; Transliteration: "Meitantei Konan Episōdo "Wan" Chīsakunatta Meitantei" (Japanese: 名探偵コナンエピソード"ONE" 小さくなった名探偵)	December 9, 2016
A complete retelling of the first two episodes of the series as a 2-hour special, with new scenes featuring characters that did not exist at that point.
7	"Love Story at Police Headquarters ~Wedding Eve~"; Transliteration: "Honchō no Keiji Koi Monogatari ~Kekkon Zen'ya~" (Japanese: 本庁の刑事恋物語～結婚前夜～)	April 15, 2022
A recap about the love story between Takagi and Sato, with new scenes at the end leading to The Bride of Halloween.
8	"Police Academy Arc Wild Police Story CASE. Rei Furuya"; Transliteration: "Keisatsu Gakkō-hen Wairudo Porīsu Sutōrī Kēsu. Furuya Rei" (Japanese: 警察学校編 Wild Police Story CASE. 降谷零)	March 11, 2023
Final part in the Detective Conan: Police Academy Arc – Wild Police Story adaptation.
9	"Kid vs. Komei: The Targeted Lips"; Transliteration: "Kiddo Vāsasu Kōmei Nerawareta Kuchibiru" (Japanese: キッドVS高明 狙われた唇)	March 30, 2024
One hour special retelling episodes 983-984 with a new added epilogue made to promote The Million-dollar Pentagram.
10	"The Gold-Star Answer"; Transliteration: "Hanamaru na Ansā" (Japanese: はなまるな真実(アンサー))	June 6, 2026
Second part of a collaboration with Toei Animation's Star Detective Precure!.
11	"The Counterfeit Case of Ultra 30"; Transliteration: "30-Gō Satsujin Jiken" (Japanese: 30号殺人事件)	September 25, 2026
Conan and the Detective Boys, along with Professor Agasa, Ran, and Sonoko, visit the Nagano factory of the Japan Banknote Printing Bureau. Meanwhile, at the Metropolitan Police Department, counterfeit money is found at the scene of a murder, and an investigation headquarters is set up. Amidst the public confusion caused by the unprecedented news of counterfeit money circulation, Conan and Heiji head to Osaka, where the counterfeit money is believed to have been printed.

== OVAs ==
=== Shōnen Sunday Original Animation ===
No.	Title	Original release date
1	"Conan vs Kid vs Yaiba - The Decisive Battle over the Treasured Sword!"; Transliteration: "Conan tai Kiddo tai Yaiba Hōtō Sōdatsu Daikessen" (Japanese: コナンvsキッドvsヤイバ 宝刀争奪大決戦!!)	2000
Phantom Thief Kid sends a message to the Yaiba family announcing his intention to steal the Treasure Sword. Richard Moore is hired to prevent the burglary. While, Conan, there with Richard and others, notices strange things and finds out the Granny of the house has the alcohol that changes his body back to normal. After drinking a similar medicine containing the same ingredient Conan starts transforming. Rather than transforming back to normal his body changes into Kogoro and then Harley and everyone thinks him as disguised Kaito Kid. While the Phantom Thief Kid invades and steals the sword from the Yaiba family, he is blasted away by a cannon. Conan realizes that too many things are inconsistent and deduces that he is dreaming. Conan then awakens in the morning and realizes it was a dream caused by excess reading of the Yaiba manga series.
2	"16 Suspects!?"; Transliteration: "Jūrokunin no Yōgisha!?" (Japanese: 16人の容疑者!?)	2002
Detective Nicholas Santos's invited his close friends to his villa to celebrate completion of his villa. The main highlight was Shiratori's prized collection of expensive wine. However, just as Shiratori was about to share his most valued wine with his guests, he discovered that its bottle was smashed. Since Shiratori himself could have accidentally dropped the bottle, he is also a suspect together with his 15 guests. Upon investigation, Harley Hartwell reveals that a mouse caused the wine bottle to drop. Conan reveals that Kogoro/Richard is responsible for the smashed bottle and reveals that the smashed wine was a fake. Serena Sebastian had replaced Shiratori's prized wine with a cheaper variant with changed label as a prank. Shiratori's shares the prized wine with his guests and they drink away the night. Conan talks with Heiji and deduces that he was the one who broke the bottle when the mouse surprised him not Kogoro.
3	"Conan and Heiji and the Vanished Boy"; Transliteration: "Conan to Heiji to Kieta Shōnen" (Japanese: コナンと平次と消えた少年)	2003
Harley Hartwell invites Conan and Rachel Moore to Osaka again. Along with Kazuha Toyama/Kirsten Thomas, they show them Osaka's major sights. In the middle of the sightseeing they run into three kids named Mayumi, Kenta, and Mikihiko who are waiting for their friend Satoshi. Since Satoshi is late, they ask Heiji/Harley to help locate Satoshi. The kids say that Satoshi is at his secret base which is only revealed through Satoshi's riddle. The kids explain Satoshi found some jewels at his secret base and Heiji reveals Satoshi's secret base which is the jewelry robbers new hiding place. After figuring out Satoshi's riddle, they are able to find Satoshi at his old house and arrest the robbers.
4	"Conan and Kid and the Crystal Mother"; Transliteration: "Conan to Kiddo to Kurisutaru Mazā" (Japanese: コナンとキッドとクリスタル·マザー)	2004
Kaito Kuroba accompanies his childhood friend, Aoko Nakamori and her father, Inspector Mace Fuller to prevent Phantom Thief Kid's theft of a Crystal from the Queen. While Kaito searches on where the Crystal is hidden, he realizes it is in Ginzo's cup. Creating a blackout, Kaito puts on his disguise as Phantom Thief Kid and steals the crystal. Kaito escapes to the top of the train where he is met by Prince Phillip who demands the crystal from him. They are then interrupted by the famous assassin Jackal who wishes to murder Phantom Thief Kid. Holding Prince Phillip hostage, Jackal demands Kaito to surrender the crystal. Conan who happened to be coincidentally on the train apprehends Jackal's accomplice meanwhile Phantom Thief Kid defeats Jackal and returns the jewel back.
5	"The Target is Kogorō Mōri!! The Detective Boys' Secret Investigation"; Transliteration: "Hyōteki wa Mōri Kogorō!! Shōnen Tanteidan Maruhi Chōsa" (Japanese: 標的は毛利小五郎!!少年探偵団マル秘調査)	2005
The Detective Boys/Junior Detective League are given a project by their teacher to study a person in their line of work. They decide to study Kogoro/Richard as he perform his duties as a private detective. They secretly follow Richard as he investigates Masaya Murakami, the boyfriend of a daughter of a rich family. Masaya is later kidnapped by a gang due to having a friend borrow money from them. Conan finds it strange they kidnapped Masaya for the money and realizes they intend to blackmail Etsuke Yamo, Masaya's girlfriend, to pay for Masaya's life. Richard and the Detective Boys/Junior Detective League secretly follows Etsuke which leads them to the gang's location where they are later apprehended by Richard with the help of the Junior Detective League.
6	"Pursuit of the Vanished Diamond! Conan, Heiji vs Kid"; Transliteration: "Kieta Daiya o Oe! Konan, Heiji vs Kiddo" (Japanese: 消えたダイヤを追え!コナン·平次vsキッド)	2006
The Mouri agency receives a suspicious phone call. Conan realizes it was blackmail for a number similar to their own. He then calls Heiji who has the same voice as the blackmailer and together they dial certain numbers to identify the victim. After finding the victim, they discover he had bought back his diamond for 10% of its value, but they soon realize the diamond was a fake. They get a tape of Heiji's voice on TV, so the public can help locate the criminal. Conan realizes the background voice from the phone call was from a Yoko Okino alarm clock. After narrowing the suspects, the culprit is caught and in a struggle, drops the diamond over the bridge. Phantom Thief Kid grabs the diamond, but returns it after the full moon.
7	"A Written Challenge from Agasa! Agasa vs Conan & the Detective Boys"; Transliteration: "Agasa kara no Chōsenjō! Agasa vs. Conan & Shōnen Tanteidan" (Japanese: 阿笠からの挑戦状!阿笠vsコナン&少年探偵団)	2007
Dr. Herschel Agasa challenges the Detective Boys to a treasure hunt game. Agasa awaits at the location the final clue leads them to and witnesses a speeding truck crash into a pole. Agasa while watching the incident, he realizes the people in the truck are holding a woman hostage. The criminals then knock Agasa unconscious and takes him to an unknown location. Agasa contacts Conan through the detective badge and tells Conan to look for him near a pole where a person wearing blue is standing by. Conan realizing Agasa does not have his glasses deduces the blue clothed person is actually blue crow nets and is able to locate Agasa. The Detective Boys then apprehend the criminals and prevent the kidnapper from taking ransom money.
8	"High School Girl Detective Sonoko Suzuki's Case Files"; Transliteration: "Joshi Kōsei Tantei Suzuki Sonoko no Jikenbo" (Japanese: 女子高生探偵 鈴木園子の事件簿)	2008
Sonoko is writing a script for a play performed in a church. In her script, a murder case and high-school detective Suzuki Sonoko is there to help solve the case. Haibara finds flaws in the deduction section of the plot and Ran decides to call Shinichi for help with the script. Conan calls back as Shinichi suggesting the murder victim was holding his belt and pointing at a shadow of the 'E' in News, E being East, translates into Higashi which was the murderer's name. The purpose of the belt was to symbolize the belt on the murderer's watch which holds the fingerprints of the victim. On the day of the performance, Sonoko comes down with a cold, preventing her from playing the lead role and Ran plays the lead instead.
9	"Stranger in 10 Years"; Transliteration: "10nen go no Ihōjin" (Japanese: 10年後の異邦人)	2009
Conan caught a bad cold and is taking a rest in bed. Then he receives a phone call from Haibara. Haibara reveals to him that she has completed an antidote for the APTX 4869. Conan quickly goes to Agasa's house and takes the pill and emerges as Shinichi. He notices things are strange when he could not find Haibara. Heading to school, Conan finds the Detective Boys as teenagers. He realizes that ten years has passed and that he is still known as Conan. Conan questions Haibara who reveals that ten years ago, Conan took the antidote too much and developed immunity to it. After five years he was unable to become Shinichi again. Conan realizes something is wrong with his memory and heads back to the Mouri agency. There he finds out from Sonoko that Ran was proposed to by Tomoaki Araide and she has yet to give an answer. He finds out Tomoaki proposed to two years ago but Ran delayed her answer, believing Shinichi would return. Sonoko reveals that Ran is waiting for Shinichi at their special place. Conan manages to find her at his house and reveals to Ran he is Shinichi. Ran does not believe him and reveals she declined Tomoaki's proposal and is willing to wait for Shinichi for another ten years. Conan suddenly wakes up and realizes he is back in the present at the Mouri agency. And Conan is glad that it is only a dream and he is still a young Conan.
10	"Kid in Trap Island"	2010
Phantom Thief Kid targets a diamond called Artemis's Tear which is owned by Shinzou Nezu, the president of a luxurious hotel on a deserted island. After Kid manages to steal the gem and escape from Conan, the Detective Boys cause Kid to crash into the forest and consequently destroying his hanglider. In the forest, Kid removes his costume and tricks the Detective Boys into believing he is Shinichi and accompanies them on their hunt for Kid. Conan meanwhile notices that Nezu is suspiciously happy Kid escaped with his gem and follows him into the forest. In the forest, Kid notices that camera's are spying on them and realizes that the Artemis's Tear is a fake when Genta's breath condensates on the diamond. Kid explains the condensation from water disappears instantly on a real diamond but remained on the gem revealing it to be counterfeit. The group is then chased into a room in a cave by a wild boar where they discover the room where counterfeit gems and paintings are created. Nezu confronts the group and prepares to kill them only to be stopped by Conan. Conan reveals that Nezu was probably attempting to have Kid steal the fake gem in order to get money from the insurance company. After Kid examines the real Artemis's Tear in the moonlight, he returns the gem to Conan and leaves. That morning, Ran and the Detective Boys decide to search for Shinichi while elsewhere, Kid leaves the island by rowing his boat.
11	"The Secret Order from London"; Transliteration: "Rondon kara no Hishirei" (Japanese: ロンドンからの秘指令)	2011
While Agasa and Conan are on a trip to London, Haibara stays with Ayumi. The two go to a high-class supermarket in order to buy some ingredients for peanut butter and jelly sandwiches and put on make-up before leaving due to Ayumi's insistence. Mitsuhiko receives a call of Conan urging him to prevent Haibara from going to Agasa's house. He then finds a picture of a child-actor from America with a strong resemblance to Haibara. He informs Genta and the two follow the girls, who are also followed by a man in a black suit, to the supermarket. Mitsuhiko deduces that Haibara is an MI6 agent and the man in black is an American mafia. After confronting the man, he is revealed to be a talent agent scouting Haibara and Ayumi. Haibara goes to Agasa's house and discovers Agasa had been secretly importing peanut butter and jelly for himself.
12	"The Miracle of Excalibur"; Transliteration: "Ekusukaribaa no Kiseki" (Japanese: えくすかりばあの奇跡)	2012
Agasa and a friend of his, who coaches a baseball team, come up with a plan to cheer up the only girl on the team after being continuously bullied by the boys. Conan and Haibara are with them. Based on a one-shot manga story by Gosho Aoyama from 1988.

=== Magic Files ===
No.	Title	Original release date
1	"Detective Conan Magic File"; Transliteration: "Meitantei Conan Magic File" (Japanese: 名探偵コナン Magic File)	April 11, 2007
Consists of Detective Conan episodes 132, 133, 134 and 196.
2	"Detective Conan Magic File 2 "Shinichi Kudo — The Case of the Mysterious Wall and the Black Labrador""; Transliteration: "Meitantei Conan Magic File 2 ～Kudō Shinichi Nazo no Kabe to Kuro Rabu Jiken～" (Japanese: 名探偵コナンMagic File 2 ～工藤新一 謎の壁と黒ラブ事件～)	April 19, 2008
A man asks Shinichi if he could find a person to confirm his alibi. The man explains that on a Thursday morning his grandmother died and the police suspects that he killed her. The man explained at the time the murder occurred, a woman with a Black Lab saw him at the park. Shinichi learns from Ran that a woman with a Black Labrador is always seen walking in the park every morning, but the problem is, the woman was passing behind the wall of the park. Yusaku helps Shinichi solve the case by handing him a violin. Shinichi realizes that the man really saw a woman walking with a black guitar case, which he misunderstood as a Black Labrador. After finding the woman and establishing the man's alibi, the real murderer is later caught. Ran, still angry with Shinichi, passes by a woman singing Amazing Grace and decides to forgive him.
3	"Detective Conan Magic File 3 "Shinichi and Ran — The Memories from Mahjong pieces and Tanabata""; Transliteration: "Meitantei Conan Magic File 3 ～Shinichi to Ran・Maajan Pai to Tanabata no Omoide～" (Japanese: 名探偵コナン Magic File 3 ～新一と蘭・麻雀牌と七夕の思い出～)	April 18, 2009
While Kogoro plays Mahjong, Ran tells Conan about her Tanabata when she was young. In elementary school, Ran's class had to write a wish and hanged it on a bamboo. Ran wished for her mother's return while her classmate Daisuke insults Ran's family by calling them dysfunctional. Ran's mother returns to spend time with her during the Tanabata holidays to her delight and she receives a strange apology from Daisuke. Ran reveals to Conan that her mother returned after Shinichi and Daisuke showed her Ran's wish. During Kogoro's Mahjong game, a man leaves angrily exclaiming Kogoro is mocking him. Conan reveals that Kogoro's discard pile coincidentally states that the man's beautiful wife who is at a villa, is having an affair. Ran wonders why Daisuke helped Shinichi carry the bamboo to her mother. In the past, it is revealed that Shinichi bribed him with a picture of Ran whom he had a crush on. Later that day, the Detective Boys invite Conan to hunt bugs with them, setting the event of Detective Conan: The Raven Chaser into motion.
4	"Detective Conan Magic File 4 "Osaka Okonomiyaki Odyssey""; Transliteration: "Meitantei Conan Magic File 4 ～Osaka Okonomiyaki Odessei～" (Japanese: 名探偵コナン Magic File 4 ～大阪お好み焼きオデッセイ～)	April 17, 2010
After the events of Detective Conan: The Lost Ship in the Sky, Conan, Heiji, and Kazuha attempt to head to an okonomiyaki restaurant before Conan has to leave Osaka. After getting past a talkative neighbor, a group of students challenging Heiji's deduction abilities, and crossing a busy street, the three run into a woman who asks them to take care of her baby, Kaoru. After the women disappears for a long period of time, Heiji realizes that the baby wearing female clothing is actually a boy and deduces that the woman kidnapped the infant. The woman soon returns and explains she found her missing husband, Hikaru, and had to chase him down. Hikaru explains he left their home after learning he is not Kaoru's father. Conan and Heiji discerns the situation upon realizing the names Hikaru and Kaoru are also characters from the book The Tale of Genji. Heiji explains that the Hikaru must have overheard his wife say that in the book, Kaoru is not Hikaru Genji's son. After sorting out the misunderstanding, the three continue on their trip until Conan receives a phone call from Ran telling him they have to leave thirty minutes earlier than expected and thus forces Conan to leave without eating.
5	"Detective Conan Magic File 2011 "The Niigata-Tokyo Souvenir Capriccio""; Transliteration: "Meitantei Conan Magic File 2011 ～Niigata ~ Tōkyō Omiyage Kapurichio～" (Japanese: 名探偵コナン Magic File 2011 ～新潟～東京 おみやげ狂騒曲～)	April 16, 2011
After returning home from their trip taking place in Detective Conan: Quarter of Silence, the Detective Boys and Sonoko realize their gifts were switched. Heiji who is visiting Conan, goes over the returning trip in order to deduce when the switch occurred. After the retelling, Sonoko reveals she marked her box the moment she left the store and causes them to realize the souvenir shop owner mistakenly switched their gifts. As Heiji prepares to leave, he notices Kogoro and Ran's gift and exchanges the labels as a prank to Conan.
6	"Detective Conan Magic File 2012 "Fantasista Flower""; Transliteration: "Meitantei Conan Magic File 2012 ～Fantasista Flower～" (Japanese: 名探偵コナン Magic File 2012 ～ファンタジスタの花～)	April 14, 2012
Fantasista Flower is a side-story OVA related to Detective Conan: The Eleventh Striker. A week after losing a close match in their middle school soccer championships, Shinichi's team finds a mysterious list of written criticisms in their teamroom, critiquing each member on their skills. Shinichi is able to discover the 'culprit', but is there something else the creator wishes to do?

== Secret File releases ==
The Shōnen Sunday Original Animation series were released yearly since 2000 with nine animations released as of March 2010. Shogakukan later collected the nine animations and released them into four DVD compilations titled Secret Files.

Shogakukan (Japan, Region 2 DVD)
Secret File Vol.#	Episodes	Release date	Ref.
Volume 1	OVA 1–3	March 24, 2006	
Volume 2	OVA 4–5	March 24, 2006	
Volume 3	OVA 6–7	April 4, 2008	
Volume 4	OVA 8–9	April 9, 2010	
