= Prescription for Murder =

Prescription for Murder may refer to:

- "Prescription for Murder", a 1958 episode of M Squad
- "Prescription for Murder", a 1990 episode of Hardball
- "Prescription for Murder", a 1998 episode of an anime Case Closed
- Prescription for Murder, a 2000s book based on real-life murders by Harold Shipman, written by journalists Brian Whittle and Jean Ritchie
- Prescription for Murder, a 2013 novel based on the television series Murder, She Wrote, written by Donald Bain
- Sawbones (film), a 1995 film also known as Prescription for Murder

== See also ==
- "Prescription: Murder", a 1968 television pilot film of Columbo
