= Okuno =

Okuno (written: 奥野) is a Japanese surname. Notable people with the surname include:

- Chloe Okuno (born 1987), American film director
- Ayaka Okuno (奥野 彩加, born 1995), Japanese tennis player
- Fumiko Okuno (奥野 史子, born 1972), Japanese synchronized swimmer
- Haruna Okuno (奥野 春菜, born 1999), Japanese sport wrestler
- Hiroaki Okuno (volleyball) (奥野 浩昭, born 1960), Japanese volleyball player
- Hiroaki Okuno (footballer) (奥埜 博亮, born 1989), Japanese football player
- Kaya Okuno (奥野 香耶, born 1991), Japanese voice actress
- Keisuke Okuno (奥野 景介, born 1965), Japanese swimmer
- Kohei Okuno (奥野 耕平, born 2000), Japanese footballer
- Ryosuke Okuno (奥野 僚右, born 1968), Japanese footballer and manager
- Seiichiro Okuno (奥野 誠一郎, born 1974), Japanese footballer
- Shinsuke Okuno (奥野 信亮, born 1944), Japanese politician
- Shohei Okuno (奥野 将平, born 1990), Japanese footballer

== See also ==
- Okuno Dam, a dam in Shizuoka Prefecture, Japan
