= Case Closed season 7 =

Season of television series

Case Closed
- Season 7
- The cover of the first DVD compilation for season seven of Detective Conan released by Shogakukan
- No. of episodes: 31

Release
- Original network: NNS (ytv)
- Original release: October 11, 1999 – June 5, 2000

Season chronology
- ← Previous; Season 6 Next → Season 8

The seventh season of the Case Closed anime was directed by Yasuichiro Yamamoto and produced by TMS Entertainment (TMS-Kyokuichi until episode 173) and Yomiuri Telecasting Corporation. The series is based on Gosho Aoyama's Case Closed manga series. In Japan, the series is titled Detective Conan (名探偵コナン, Meitantei Conan) but was changed due to legal issues with the title Detective Conan. The episodes' plot covers the arc where Conan Edogawa temporary returns as Jimmy Kudo.

The episodes use four pieces of theme music: two opening themes and two closing themes. The first opening theme is "Giri Giri Chop" (ギリギリ Chop, lit. "Chop Rasp") by B'z until episode 168. The second opening theme is "Mysterious Eyes" by Garnet Crow and is used for the rest of the season. The first ending theme is "Free Magic" by WAG until episode 179. The second ending theme is "Secret of My Heart" by Mai Kuraki.

The season initially ran from October 11, 1999, through June 5, 2000, on Nippon Television Network System in Japan. Episodes one to twenty-eight were later collected into nine DVD compilations by Shogakukan. They were released between March 25, 2001, and January 15, 2002, in Japan.

Episodes 176 to 178 were dubbed by Studio Nano as part of a curated episode list, which was released on Crunchyroll and Netflix on July 3, 2025. Episodes 170 and 171 were later dubbed and released on May 1, 2026.

== Episode list ==
No. overall	No. in season	Title	Directed by	Written by	Original release date
163	1	"The Secret of the Moon, the Star, and the Sun (Part 1)"; Transliteration: "Tsuki to Hoshi to Taiyō no Himitsu (Zenpen)" (Japanese: 月と星と太陽の秘密（前編）)	Nana Harada	N/A	
Agasa takes the Detective Boys to his uncle's house which has been abandoned fifty years ago for a treasure hunt he had set up. Conan finds a 1 yen coin and reveals to Agasa that those coins were not produced until forty years ago and that someone had been living in the abandoned house. Conan investigates and finds evidence that an old man who spent his spare time carving coins lived in the house. Conan notices that someone has drawn strange codes on objects throughout the house. The codes are symbols consisting of the moon, star, and sun. The Detective Boys manage to find their treasure and realize that someone had destroyed them all. Conan deduces that an unknown culprit entered the house in search of some kind of treasure and was angered when Agasa's riddles lead him to a box of toys. Conan and the Detective Boys gather all the objects in the house with the strange codes on them and attempts to solve it. Agasa reveals that his aunt was receiving letters in the same code and that he had Booker Kudo decipher the message; He also reveals that when his aunt began receiving those letters, someone was looking through her mail. Conan realizes the symbols refer to Hiragana and that the culprit who was looking through Agasa's aunt's mail is the one who destroyed the toys and is searching for the treasure in the house.
164	2	"The Secret of the Moon, the Star, and the Sun (Part 2)"; Transliteration: "Tsuki to Hoshi to Taiyō no Himitsu (Kōhen)" (Japanese: 月と星と太陽の秘密（後編）)	Hirohito Ochi	N/A	October 18, 1999
Conan matches the symbols to the Hiragana table and reveals that the symbols in the objects direct to other objects in the room. Conan notices that the objects conjoin in the center of room and realizes it refers to the chandelier. Conan matches the markings on the chandeliers which causes a stairway to the attic to appear. The Detective Boys find a skeleton of an elderly man in the attic. Conan reveals that man was the one who created the code and was sending the mail to Agasa's aunt. Conan finds a 20 dollar plate used for creating counterfeit money and explains that the man was hiding from the person who forced him to create plates. The culprit reveals himself and says that he had been searching the mansion for the plate for many years and attempts to steal it from them. Conan however apprehends the criminal and he is arrested afterwards.
165	3	"The Disappearing Detective Boys Case"; Transliteration: "Shōnen Tantei-dan Shōshitsu Jiken" (Japanese: 少年探偵団消失事件)	Masato Sato	Junichi Miyashita	October 25, 1999
The Detective Boys are in a puppeteer camping trip, where they are practicing for a school puppet play. At the same time, a serial killer has been spotted near the areas of the camp. While at the camp, the students disappear with their puppets, leaving the Detective Boys alone. Mitsuhiko assumes that their teacher is the serial killer. After they disspear, only Mitsuhiko remains alone. After being cornered by the teacher, Mitsuhiko finds out they decided to scare him for being bossy, by the suggestions of Genta and Ayumi. Mitsuhiko runs away angrily but runs into the serial killer. Conan manages to stop the serial killer and he is arrested. Later, Ayumi kisses Mitsuhiko for playing that mean joke on him.
166	4	"Tottori Spider Mansion Demon (The Murder)"; Transliteration: "Tottori Kumo-yashiki no Kai (Jikenhen)" (Japanese: 鳥取クモ屋敷の怪（事件編）)	Kazuo Nogami	N/A	November 1, 1999
Hattori Heiji, bringing along Kazuha, is hired by the rich Takeda family to investigate a series of suspicious suicides that has plagued their mansion in Tottori Prefecture. Along the way, he gets lost but runs into Robert Taylor, a lost American, and Kogoro, Ran, and Conan, who happen to be traveling to meet the same client for the same reason. After arriving at the mansion, they meet the Takeda family, consisting of Yuzo, Yoko, Ryuji, Nobukazu, Sae, Emi, Chie, and housekeeper Shioya. Yuzo explains to them of the "spider curse"; in ancient times, a beautiful woman morphed into a gigantic spider attempting to attack a traveler but was shot with burning arrows and retreated to the forest where it died. Misa and Kinuyo Takeda both hanged themselves, and 3 years before, Akio hung himself as well. All three deaths would be blamed on the spider demon. When dinner is finished, Nobukazu disappears, but is found in hanging in a locked room with his corpse entangled in a "spider's web." Later that night, Kazuha finds a pearl on the ground outside and, unbeknowns to her, is being stalked by the killer.
167	5	"Tottori Spider Mansion Demon (The Suspicion)"; Transliteration: "Tottori Kumo-yashiki no Kai (Giwakuhen)" (Japanese: 鳥取クモ屋敷の怪（疑惑編）)	Yoshio Suzuki	N/A	November 8, 1999
Conan and Heiji investigate further into the ghastly death of Nobukazu as well as the suicides of Misa, Kinuyo, and Negishi. Nobukazu suffered a blow to the back of the head before he was killed. It is brought to light that Robert was involved in a rockslide accident but was nursed back to health by Misa; they communicated with Rōmaji, but after Robert left, Misa committed suicide, her mother, Kinuyo, followed suit. Misa was already facing depression because she had learn that she was not her father's daughter, shrouding her birth in mystery. At Misa's funeral, Ryuji expressed deeper emotions and cried profusely. Emi and Sae claim Robert killed Misa after wrote a letter telling her to die. Robert has an alibi for the crime as he drove to the mountains with Ran and Kazuha. Chie was alone in her room, and Yoko was bathing with her daughters. When Kazuha hasn't been seen for some time, the group finds her entangled in the spider's web, severely injured but still alive. Heiji finds a stun gun in the incinerator, he and Conan find tiny holes in the window at the crime scene and fishing lines with hoops at each end, and Negishi and Nobukazu are believed to be drug dealers after cocaine is found in their puppets. Together, they realize who the killer is and how the murder was pulled off.
168	6	"Tottori Spider Mansion Demon (The Resolution)"; Transliteration: "Tottori Kumo-yashiki no Kai (Kaiketsuhen)" (Japanese: 鳥取クモ屋敷の怪（解決編）)	Minoru Tozawa	N/A	November 15, 1999
Conan tranquilizes Kogoro and cooperates with Heiji to shed light on the case. First, Misa and Kinuyo both committed suicide with Misa's being the source of the Tsuchigumo rumor and its supposed curse. Next, Misa's real father is Ryuji, not Nobukazu. The conception was an arrangement between Ryuji and Kinuyo, because Nobukazu had been declared steril and Kinuyo desperately wanted a child. This is evidenced by Ryuji's emotions at Misa's funeral given that he is her actual father. Finally, the killer set up massive piles of fishing line and a noose that was connected to a car with string. Nobukazu was lured to the room under the promise of a fruitful drug deal and killed; A BB gun pellet was shot at the window to get Nobukazu to look out. When the killer drove away, the noose wraps around Nobukazu's neck pulling him in the opposite direction. His head struck the central beam nearly killing him instantly. The string snaps causing his corpse to fall into the fishing line below in order to take revenge for Misa's suicide as well to put blame on the spider curse. Robert is the murderer, he is revealed to have killed Negishi as well for making a rude comment about Misa, and attacked Kazuha because she found a BB gun pellet mistaking it for a pearl. As evidence, a few people knew about Nobukazu's death as he was entangled in strings and outside of those, one more person knew, the killer himself. Robert confesses how he was enraged how no one stopped Misa's suicide. When he shows no mercy for attacking Kazuha, Heiji reveals it was his own message; Robert wrote "SHINE" as in "the shine of his life." "SHI-NE" in Japanese means "die." Robert, completely devastated and regretting his actions, is arrested for the murders.
169	7	"Venus' Kiss"; Transliteration: "Biinasu no Kissu" (Japanese: ビーナスのキッス)	Nana Harada	Takeshi Mochizuki	November 22, 1999
Michiko Oosawa invites Kogoro, who brings Ran and Conan, to watch her underwater stage play at the local aquarium. They meet stage manager Masato Hayashi, and staff members Yuriko Minegishi and Yasuyuki Murakawa. Later during the show, Michiko's corpse rises from the shell, horrifying everyone in the audience. As the investigation begins, a wet compress is found on Michiko's leg and it is discovered that she was suffering from leg pain in the pass, despite wearing high heels before she was drowned. Scattered make up items and stains are found in her dressing room. Conan tranquilizes Kogoro, explaining that Michiko was murdered and that Yasuyuki was her killer. Yasuyuki drugged Michiko and carried her to the tank before the show began. He placed the wet compress on her leg to make it seem that her leg injury was the cause of her death, then watched as the tank filled with water which killed Michiko. A red upside down lipstick mark is found on Yasuyuki's back just below his neck, concrete evidence that he carried Michiko's unconscious body over his shoulder. Defeated, Yasayuki confesses and explains that Michiko struck and killed his wife and young son in a hit-and-run incident. He accidentally overheard a conversation between Michiko and her father, where Michiko coldly laughed and bragged how Yasayuki didn't recognize her from that incident. It wasn't until long after from there that Yasayuki decided to murder her.
170	8	"Blind Spot in the Darkness (Part 1)"; Transliteration: "Kurayami no Naka no Shikaku (Zenpen)" (Japanese: 暗闇の中の死角（前編）)	Hirohito Ochi	N/A	November 29, 1999
Conan detects a change in Ran's behavior and speculates that she may have something going on. Kogoro, on the other hand, takes them to his doctor Yoshiteru Araide's house for a checkup. There, they meet the doctor, his wife Yoko, his mother Mitsu, and son, Tomoaki Araide, with who Ran seems smitten by. The maid, Hikaru, breaks a vase and is warned by Yoshiteru that she'll be fired if she does it again. During dinner, Yoshiteru takes a bath and a black out occurs and another vase breaks. Hikaru flips the breaker on, and she and Yoko find Yoshiteru dead with his electric razor in the bathtub. Alibis and suspect locations are checked but Conan can't bring himself to concentrate on the case as Tomoaki and Ran are seen drawing closer to each other.
171	9	"Blind Spot in the Darkness (Part 2)"; Transliteration: "Kurayami no Naka no Shikaku (Kōhen)" (Japanese: 暗闇の中の死角（後編）)	Kazuo Nogami	N/A	December 6, 1999
Conan establishes that Yoshiteru was murdered and finds several clues missed by the police including a broken piece of a vase. Mitsu suffered a small cut and Hikaru burnt herself. Conan, through Kogoro, announces his experiment to solve the case, however, it is actually a trap to catch the killer, Yoko Araide. Conan deduces that Yoko flashed her pin light in Yoshiteru's face so he wouldn't see her sliding the razor into the bathtub. Hikaru flipped the breaker back on, thus killing Yoshiteru, as planned by Yoko. Prior to the murder, Hikaru broke another vase and hid it out of fear of being fired. Mitsu stepped on a shard on the second floor, and Tomoaki was held by Ran during the situation, leaving Yoko the only one with ample opportunity to commit the murder. Yoko confesses that her friend Chaiki was married to Yoshiteru but committed suicide due to his infidelity. She would then marry him to exact her revenge. Conan requests Yoko to bend the truth to spare Hikaru from knowing she is the actual cause of her employer's death. After the case, Ran asks Tomoaki for his sweater so she can knit a similar one for Shinichi.
172	10	"The Revival of the Dying Message (Part 1)"; Transliteration: "Yomigaeru Shi no Dengon (Zenpen)" (Japanese: よみがえる死の伝言（前編）)	Masato Sato	N/A	December 13, 1999
Ran, Sonoko, and Conan are at the Tropical Land ice rink where they meet a group of people: Yasuharu Misawa, Izumi Sano, Yoriko Komatsu, Chihiro Itami, and Kunitomo Oda. Chihiro goes to the women's bathroom where she is being followed by a cloaked figure. A shotgun is forced into Chihiro's mouth by the figure as she attempts to talk her way out of her situation. Moments later, the fireworks start and Sonoko finds Chihiro dead inside the bathroom stall. An "S" smeared in blood indicates that Izumi Sano is the killer but she has the alibi of being with Ran at the start of the fireworks. They find Chihiro's phone in her pocket and when they try redialing the last number, it reveals the letters "K.I.X".
173	11	"The Revival of the Dying Message (Part 2)"; Transliteration: "Yomigaeru Shi no Dengon (Kōhen)" (Japanese: よみがえる死の伝言（後編）)	Hideki Hiroshima	N/A	December 20, 1999
Bloody marks are discovered at and near the crime scene. Conan puts Kogoro to sleep to reveal that the culprit imitated the fireworks noise by blowing into a 5 yen coin, making people believe the fireworks started early. The killer is revealed to be Izumi Sano and the "S" is not the real code, but the "K.I.X." was. Chihiro was killed instantly as she was shot through her heart. K.I.X is the special code for Kansai Int'l Airport, located in Izumisano, Japan. She wrote the "S" on the wall after killing Chihiro with her own shotgun, using reverse psychology as the basis of her methods. As evidence, the blades of Izumi's skates have traces of Chihiro's blood on them. Izumi confesses with revenge as her motive for a deceased friend whose fatal accident was really a suicide, caused by Chihiro's lies. The next day, Ran receives a new phone from Shinichi in the mail.
174	12	"The 20 Year Old Murder Case: The Symphony Serial Murders^{2 hrs.}" Transliteration: "Nijuunenme no Satsui Shinfoniigou Renzoku Satsujin Jiken" (Japanese: 20年目の殺意 シンフォニー号連続殺人事件)	Hajime Kamegaki	N/A	January 3, 2000
Saizo Kano, known as the Organizer of Shadows, is shot to death by his subordinates, Sadao Kujirai, Korehisa Kanie, and Teruyoshi Kameda. In the present day, while celebrating their last heist on a luxury cruise ship, Kano's crew is picked off one by one by a mysterious killer. The stakes are raised when Heiji is thrown into the Pacific Ocean while investigating and a bomb is discovered to be hidden on the ship. Is there something more sinister afloat, or has Kano returned from the dead to enact his vengeance 20 years later?
175	13	"The Man Who Was Killed Four Times"; Transliteration: "Yonkai Korosareta Otoko" (Japanese: 四回殺された男)	Minoru Tozawa	Nobuo Ogizawa	January 10, 2000
Richard is called to investigate a suspicious murder where three people admit to killing a man for hitting him on the head. His posture showed the death to be a heart attack. They are all actors in an actor studio, their boss was the manager. After seeing the evidence, they find out that all four of them have attacked him but not killed him. He was killed by his wife who stole his heart pills and he died of a heart attack.
176	14	"Re-encounter with the Black Organization (Haibara's Part)"; Transliteration: "Kuro no Soshiki to no Saikai (Haibara-hen)" (Japanese: 黒の組織との再会（灰原編）)	Hirohito Ochi	N/A	January 17, 2000
On the way home from school, Conan and Haibara find Gin's Porsche 356 on the street and places a covert listening device in it. Conan hears that a Black Organization member codenamed Pisco is ordered to assassinate someone at a party hosted at Haido Hotel. Gin finds a strand of Haibara's hair in the car and manages to find the bug and destroys it; He realizes Haibara will be at the hotel and orders Pisco to kill her when he gets the chance. Conan and Haibara head to the hotel in order to capture Pisco. During a slide show, Pisco manages to murder his target, a lawyer named Shigehiko Nomiguchi, by causing a chandelier to fall onto of him.
177	15	"Re-encounter with the Black Organization (Conan's Part)"; Transliteration: "Kuro no Soshiki to no Saikai (Conan-hen)" (Japanese: 黒の組織との再会（コナン編）)	Kazuo Nogami	N/A	January 24, 2000
Conan investigates and reveals to Haibara that the purple handkerchief will narrow down the suspects. Conan explains that the party is holding an event that is dedicated to a film known as "The Rainbow Handkerchief"; all the party guests are given various handkerchiefs with colors of the rainbow and that Pisco is one of the people in the purple handkerchief group. When the party guests rush out of the room in a panic, Haibara is knocked unconscious by Pisco and awakens in a locked wine storage room. Conan contacts Haibara through a communication device and tells her he had the police hold up the seven suspects which will buy her time to escape. Conan tells Haibara to drink some wine which when combined with her cold will negate the effects of to APTX 4869 and subsequently allowing her to regress back into her teenage self, Shiho Miyano. Meanwhile, Gin and Vodka enter the hotel and make their way to the storage room.
178	16	"Re-encounter with the Black Organization (The Resolution)"; Transliteration: "Kuro no Soshiki to no Saikai (Kaiketsuhen)" (Japanese: 黒の組織との再会（解決編）)	Nana Harada	N/A	January 31, 2000
Haibara climbs to the top of the chimney only to be confronted by Gin and Vodka. Gin explains that he heard her breathing in the chimney while in the storage room and was waiting to ambush her on the roof. Gin prepares to kill her but is saved when Conan intervenes – changing his voice so they will not recognize him later; allowing Haibara to fall down the chimney and back into the storage room before becoming a child again. Pisco prepares to kill Haibara before he is interrupted by Conan who greets him as Kenzou Matsuyama the party guest. Conan reveals that Matsuyama lured Nomiguichi under the chandelier during the slide show and fired a silenced handgun at a fluorescence painted section of the chandelier causing it to kill Nomiguichi. Conan asks how Matsuyama was able to get a purple handkerchief after losing his but Matsuyama refuses to answer the question. Matsuyama's cigarette mixed with the wine in the storage room causes a fire and allows Conan and Haibara to escape. Gin confronts Matsuyama and explains that a journalist had taken a picture of Matsuyama committing the crime; To keep the Organization a secret, Gin kills Matsuyama. Shortly after, Gin and Vodka are seen with a third Black Organization member codenamed Vermouth.
179	17	"The Coffee Shop Truck's Wild Entrance Case"; Transliteration: "Kissaten Torakku Rannyuu Jiken" (Japanese: 喫茶店トラック乱入事件)	Hiroshi Kurimoto	Satoshi Kitagawa	February 7, 2000
Conan and the group go to a coffee shop. Nearby, two men, an advertising company's CEO and designer, are having a meeting. The CEO gets up to go to the bathroom, and while he's gone, a truck slams into the coffee shop and kills the designer who was still seated. Conan realizes it was a planned murder and finds evidence through the truck, and the CEO's cut. Conan reveals through Agasa that the CEO put a wedge in front of the truck's wheel which was tied to a waiting bus with fishing line, thus preventing the truck from rolling before he could return to the restaurant. As evidence, the leftover fishing wire is still in the CEO's car and his blood is on it from where he cut himself. The CEO confesses and reveals that his company was on the brink of bankruptcy, and the designer's plans to leave for a competitor was the final straw.
180	18	"The Nocturne of Red Murderous Intent (Part 1)"; Transliteration: "Akai Satsui no Nocturne (Zenpen)" (Japanese: 赤い殺意の夜想曲（前編）)	Kazuo Nogami	Chiaki Hashiba	February 14, 2000
Kogoro is invited by Yoshinori Kana to his home to investigate an unknown stalker harassing his wife, Misaki, who leaves mysterious gifts and letters. After meeting the others; Masayo Tokudaiji, Michel Anglade, and Hideki Kana, a blackout occurs during a party. Conan and Kogoro rush to Misaki's aid, and they find her forcibly grabbed by who appears to be her stalker. The stalker jumps out the window and escapes. Conan realizes these occurrences are related to the song "Nocturne of Red." As the night progresses, the guest of honor, famous singer Gerard, arrives, only to meet an unfortunate end as a sword falls from the chandelier and impales him in the back. Evidence suggests Gerard was the one stalking Misaki and Yoshinori killed him for it, but Conan has his doubts.
181	19	"The Nocturne of Red Murderous Intent (Part 2)"; Transliteration: "Akai Satsui no Nocturne (Kōhen)" (Japanese: 赤い殺意の夜想曲（後編）)	Minoru Tozawa	Chiaki Hashiba	February 21, 2000
Solving the case, Conan tranquilizes Kogoro and shows everyone there never was a stalker; the mysterious man was a statue hanged by a fishing rod. Conan then reveals Misaki killed Gerard by tricking him into bending over before dropping the sword on him from above. Misaki confesses and reveals she had already tried to kill Gerard 10 years earlier, and when she learned he survived, she finished him off to protect Yoshinori and his company from a scandal. Afterwards, Conan gives Ran flowers. Ran interprets the flowers with the meaning Invincible and gets angry at Conan.
182	20	"The Big Investigation of the Nine Doors"; Transliteration: "Daisousaku no Kokonotsu no Doa" (Japanese: 大捜索9つのドア)	Nana Harada	Kazunari Kochi	February 28, 2000
The Detective Boys are walking home one day when they discover two s shaped hooks and a ring with the initials M to A, a wedding ring. They decide to investigate seeing it as an S.O.S. After a false alarm, Conan realizes one of the person who answered the door was not the actual person. He tranquilizers the culprit and saves the woman who was tied up.
183	21	"A Dangerous Recipe"; Transliteration: "Kiken na Reshipi" (Japanese: 危険なレシピ)	Hiroshi Kurimoto	Kazunari Kochi	March 6, 2000
One day, The Detective Boys were bored so they picked up receipts in a convenience store to guess what the people are buying for dinner. George picks up a weird receipt with food items, a dust bin, a container, a handler light, rechargeable batteries, thin lytax gloves, and chlorine. Conan figures out the man is trying to make the same poisoned bait used to kill moles. After searching around town to the stores they visit, they find out the approximation of the man's house and begin searching for bikes with handler lights and no basket. After finding him and following him one night, they find out he was trying to poison a dog to death. His motive was to silence the vicious and loud dog so he may once again walk his favorite path in peace.
184	22	"A Cursed Mask Coldly Laughs^{1 hr.}" Transliteration: "Noroi no Kamen wa Tsumetaku Warau" (Japanese: 呪いの仮面は冷たく笑う)	Hirohito Ochi	Hirohito Ochi	March 13, 2000
Kogorou, Ran, and Conan are invited by the hostess of a car accident charity named Shou Beniko. While driving, they find a message from the Phantom of the Cursed Masks who tells them they should not go. Once there, they find other famous celebrities; a baseball player, a prophet, a rockstar, and a man who lost his wife in a Hit and Run incident. The mansion they will be staying at is a huge mansion divided by the east and west side; and the only room connecting the two sides is the mask room, which is locked at midnight due to Shobel's mask. They were created by a famous man who lost everything and became engrossed in his masks; once he created 200 of them, he was found dead in his room surrounded with bloody masks. People who have owned his mask have suffered tragic fates. Shou who now owns all 200 masks has a priest place a seal on the curse, but the room will locked at midnight to prevent them from wandering. During their stay, Shou was murdered in a locked room with masks surrounding her and a dagger in her throat. Conan later figures out the trick and reveals the rockstar as the culprit. The rockstar reveals that his mother was blamed for a hit and run incident and murdered by Shou, who then took fame and profit from her charity.
185	23	"The Murdered Famous Detective (Part 1)"; Transliteration: "Korosareta Meitantei (Zenpen)" (Japanese: 殺された名探偵（前編）)	Mashu Ito	Chiaki Hashiba	April 10, 2000
Kogoro, Ran, and Conan are driving by when an arrow almost hits Kogoro. Afterwards, they stay at a hotel when an actor is found dead with a bullet in his head and all the evidence suggests it is the work of an outsider.
186	24	"The Murdered Famous Detective (Part 2)"; Transliteration: "Korosareta Meitantei (Kōhen)" (Japanese: 殺された名探偵（後編）)	Kazuo Nogami	Chiaki Hashiba	April 17, 2000
Conan later solves the case by showing how the culprit tried to place false evidence to lure the police to think it was an outsider. He later shows that a gun was not used to shoot the bullet but an arrow was. The culprit is arrested and he reveals he wanted to write a perfect crime script that no one could solve. Afterwards, Kogoro is offered a chance to star in his own show but Ran forces him to drive away before a deal could be made.
187	25	"The Mysterious Gun Rings in the Dark"; Transliteration: "Yami ni Hibiku Nazo no Juusei" (Japanese: 闇に響く謎の銃声)	Minoru Tozawa	Manabu Harada	April 24, 2000
Kogoro is invited to a house as to impress the client's mother who is a finance trader, simply a loaner. Later, the loaner is murdered and with the clues, the suspects are her gambler son, her TV producer daughter, or her maid. Conan manages to solve the case and reveals the television was used by to create the gunshot noise, while the loaner had been murdered by her daughter much earlier. The daughter confesses that she was tired of her mother spoiling her brother while she herself was struggling to keep her company afloat.
188	26	"Risking Life for Revival: The Detective Boys in a Cave" / "The Desperate Revival – The Cavern of the Detective Boys"; Transliteration: "Inochigake no Fukkatsu ~Doukutsu no Tantei-dan~" (Japanese: 命がけの復活〜洞窟の探偵団〜)	Hiroshi Kurimoto	N/A	May 1, 2000
Ran's strange behavior causes Conan to suspect that she knows his identity as Jimmy. Later on, the Detective Boys are taken by Agasa on a camping trip. The Detective Boys explore a cave only to find bank robbers hiding a dead body. Conan manages to hide the Detective Boys but is shot in the process. With the entrance guarded by the robbers, Conan, carried by George, leads the Detective Boys deeper into the cave to find another entrance. As they navigate through the cave, they come upon a monument of an egg with the message "Those who are lost in the dark, take your steps towards the path of the dragon, then you shall be showered by the light of happiness." Conan explains that the monument explains which of the five paths ahead shall lead them to the outside and passes out from his injury before he could point them to the right direction.
189	27	"Risking Life for Revival: The Wounded Great Detective" / "The Desperate Revival – The Wounded Great Detective"; Transliteration: "Inochigake no Fukkatsu ~Fushoushita Meitantei~" (Japanese: 命がけの復活〜負傷した名探偵〜)	Nana Harada	N/A	May 8, 2000
The Detective Boys realize that the riddle is a reference to shogi and that the dragon refers to a promoted rook. They take the direction a rook is placed on the shogi board and escape the cave. The robbers are then apprehended by the authorities and Conan is taken to a hospital. At the hospital, the nurse reveals to Conan's friends that they ran out of Conan's blood type. Ran allows them to use her blood for Conan's blood transfusion and subsequently reveals that she knows Conan is Jimmy. A few days after Conan's surgery, Conan decides to tell Ran his true identity as Jimmy. Later that night, Vi enters Conan's room and holds a gun towards him.
190	28	"Risking Life for Revival: The Third Choice" / "The Desperate Revival – The Third Choice"; Transliteration: "Inochigake no Fukkatsu ~Daisan no Sentaku~" (Japanese: 命がけの復活〜第三の選択〜)	Kazuo Nogami	N/A	May 15, 2000
Vi reveals the gun was a fake and reminds Conan the threat that the Black Organization poses. Since Ran knows Conan's identity, hiding it from her would be cruel but telling her would endanger the lives of everyone around him. Vi gives Conan a third choice that can solve the problem. The next day, Conan attends Ran's play where a Ran and a mysterious black knight are the main characters. During the play a man named Kouhei Mazuda dies from potassium cyanide ingestion. Heiji, disguised as Jimmy, attempts to trick Ran but is discovered by Kirsten. After removing his disguise Heiji concludes that the suspects are Mazuda's friends and the drink vendor.
191	29	"Risking Life for Revival: The Knight in Black" / "The Desperate Revival – The Black Knight"; Transliteration: "Inochigake no Fukkatsu ~Kokui no Kishi~" (Japanese: 命がけの復活〜黒衣の騎士〜)	Kazuo Nogami	N/A	May 22, 2000
The police are unable to find the source of the poison from the drinks. As they are able to rule the death as a suicide, the black knight declares it was a murder and reveals his identity to be Jimmy. Jimmy reveals that the poison was placed in the ice cubes and that Mazuda had a habit of eating ice. He reveals the murderer to be Mazuda's friend, Mai Kougami. Jimmy explains that Mai kept the ice cubes in a little purse which was kept cool through dry ice. Mai says that she bought the same drink as Mazuda and that there was only a fifty percent chance that he would take the drink with the poisoned ice cubes. Jimmy explains she put ice cubes in both drinks and that after emptying her drink, she placed the poisoned ice cubes in her hood evidenced when a 10 yen coin undergoes a chemical reaction with contact to her hood. Mai confesses and explains that Mazuda murdered his patient in order to have his medical thesis published. Shinichi collapses after solving the case and wakes up and realizes he still retains he is still Shinichi and has not regressed back to Conan.
192	30	"Risking Life for Revival: Shinichi Returns..." / "The Desperate Revival – Shinichi's Return..."; Transliteration: "Inochigake no Fukkatsu ~Kaette kita Shinichi...~" (Japanese: 命がけの復活〜帰ってきた新一...〜)	Nana Harada	N/A	May 29, 2000
The next day, Shinichi takes Ran to a fancy restaurant in order to confess his love. While there, a party for game company chief executive Taiji Tatsumi is to take place. Those who will attend are Satoru Ooba, his girlfriend Sakurako Tatsumi, and a few other employees. Taiji steps into the elevator and Satoru, brandishing a gun by his side, sends the others away, keeping Sakurako by his side. Satoru kisses Sakurako, opens the elevator door, and brutally murders a terrified Taiji with a bullet into his skull. He then gives Sakurako a present and compliments her earrings saying they look like a pink pearl necklace. Shinichi runs off just as Taiji's murder investigation begins. He instantly proclaims Satoru as the murderer but Sakurako defends him, adding on that no gun residue was found on him. The weapon was found on in the garbage. Shinichi asks Sakurako about the kiss with Satoru and realizes how Satoru executed Taiji's murder.
193	31	"Risking Life for Revival: The Promised Place" / "The Desperate Revival – The Promised Place"; Transliteration: "Inochigake no Fukkatsu ~Yakusoku no Basho~" (Japanese: 命がけの復活〜約束の場所〜)	Minoru Tozawa	N/A	June 5, 2000
After checking the company's mascot, Shinichi confirms Satoru to be the murderer, thus locking the two in a game of cat and mouse. Shinichi reveals that Satoru suggested to Taiji to change clothes in the elevator where he murdered him. Satoru covered Sakurako's ear and shot Taiji at the beginning of the party to mask the sound of the gun whilst kissing Sakurako with a silenced pistol, glove and plastic bag so his clothes would not be stained with gunpowder. He got rid of the gun by throwing it down the garbage chute while waiting for Sakurako who was in the bathroom. As evidence, the plastic bag was hid in a mascot costume and that it contains Satoru's fingerprints; however, he counters stating that his co-workers also touched the plastic bag. Shinichi reveals that Satoru already confessed to the crime also since he said his girlfriend's earrings were pink yet color is not distinguishable in the dark and thus states that Satoru was with his girlfriend when the elevator doors opened. Satoru confesses and reveals that his father's company was destroyed by Taiji and prompted his father to suicide. Shinichi escapes to the bathroom and regresses back to Conan. Ran, completely devastated that Shinichi left to solve another case, has a few words with Conan and eats ice cream with him.

== Notes ==
- ^1 hr. One hour long special episode.
- ^2 hrs. Two hour long special episode.
