= Case Closed season 8 =

Season of television series

Case Closed
- Season 8
- The cover of the first DVD compilation for season eight of Detective Conan released by Shogakukan
- No. of episodes: 26

Release
- Original network: NNS (ytv)
- Original release: June 12, 2000 – January 8, 2001

Season chronology
- ← Previous; Season 7 Next → Season 9

The eighth season of the Case Closed anime was directed by Yasuichiro Yamamoto and produced by TMS Entertainment and Yomiuri Telecasting Corporation. The series is based on Gosho Aoyama's Case Closed manga series. In Japan, the series is titled Detective Conan (名探偵コナン, Meitantei Conan) but was changed due to legal issues with the title Detective Conan. The episodes' plot follows Conan Edogawa's daily adventures.

The episodes use five pieces of theme music: two opening themes and three closing themes. The first opening theme is "Mysterious Eyes" by Garnet Crow until episode 204. The second opening theme is "Koi wa Thrill, Shock, Suspense" (恋はスリル,ショック,サスペンス, Koi wa Suriru, Shokku, Sasupensu; lit. 'Love is Thrill, Shock, and Suspense') by Rina Aiuchi. The first ending theme is "Secret of My Heart" by Mai Kuraki until episode 204. The second ending theme is Natsu no Maboroshi (夏の幻, lit. "Summer's Illusion") by Garnet Crow. The third ending theme is "Start in My Life" by Mai Kuraki and begins on episode 219.

The season initially ran from June 12, 2000, through January 8, 2001, on Nippon Television Network System in Japan. Episodes 194 to 219 were later collected into nine DVD compilations by Shogakukan. They were released between March 25, 2002, and September 25, 2002, in Japan.

== Episode list ==
No. overall	No. in season	Title	Directed by	Written by	Original release date
194	1	"The Significant Music Box (Part 1)"; Transliteration: "Imishin na Orugooru (Zenpen)" (Japanese: 意味深なオルゴール（前編）)	Hiroshi Kurimoto	N/A	June 12, 2000
A girl named Yuuki Haruna asks Kogoro Mouri to search for a man named Shuugo whom she texts with on her pager. She explains that her Shuugo sent her a musical box to help pay for her tuition but she could not bring herself to sell something valuable and wants to return it. Conan notices the music box plays the song "Haru Yo Koi" (春よ、来い, lit. "Come Dear Spring") and missed three notes "La, Do, La". After tracing the number on the pager, they visit the Ogata family who reveals that Shuugo was an elderly man who had recently died. The Ogata family reveal that Shuugo hid stamps worth a fortune somewhere and the house and they suspect Haruna is there to take it from them. They allow Kogoro, Ran Mouri, Conan, and Haruna to spend the night at their household. During the night, Ran and Haruna witness a shadow of an elderly man fly by, a Koto falls on top of one of the Ogata family members and injures him, and Haruna receives a threatening message on her pager. Conan concludes that one of the Ogata family members wants to scare Haruna away.
195	2	"The Significant Music Box (Part 2)"; Transliteration: "Imishin na Orugooru (Kōhen)" (Japanese: 意味深なオルゴール（後編）)	Nana Harada	N/A	June 19, 2000
Conan investigates and realizes how the pranks were done and who is attempting to scare Haruna away. After tranquilizing Kogoro, Conan reveals that the shadow was created with the use of black paper tapped to a window. When a moving car light flashes through the window, it creates the shadow of a flying figure. As for the Koto, Conan explains that the Koto was suspended through a very long string which was released by the culprit; As evidence, Conan reveals that a hairpin was found at the door where the string was and the one who opened the door was Kazuko Ogata. Kazuko confesses and explains that she did not want Haruna to have the stamps since her family is currently in need of the money. Conan reveals that the missing music notes reveal the location of the stamps. Conan explains that the missing notes in Solfège are La, Do, La, but in Iroha its I-Ha-I which is referring to Spirit tablet (位牌, Ihai). A few days after the case, Shirou Ogata reveals that he is in a relationship with Haruna and thanks Kogoro for solving the case.
196	3	"The Invisible Weapon: Ran's First Investigation"; Transliteration: "Mienai Kyouki Ran no Hatsu-suiri" (Japanese: 見えない凶器 蘭の初推理)	Masato Sato	Kazunari Kochi	June 26, 2000
Ran and Sonoko are on their way to a restaurant when Chie Yoshino allegedly falls asleep in her car but nearly misses them at the last moment. They soon meet Akio, Chie's husband, but Ran finds his actions suspicious. The next day, Ran takes Conan and Sonoko to the Yoshino household where she learns that Chie has a very high insurance policy and she plans to buy Akio an extremely expensive new sports car. Ran is convinced that Akio may be trying to wear her body out to murder her in an incident disguised as an unfortunate accident. Kogoro catches wind of Ran's investigation and demands she cease and to stay out of other people's business. After inspecting the newly built house for Sick building syndrome, Conan finds out that her husband did something to the car. Chie prepares to leave for work; Akio maniacally smiles and goes to spray poison into the ventilation system of Chie's car, however he is caught in the act by Conan and Ran, confirming Ran's theory. Akio confesses that his company pressured him along with his want for a car. He is taken into custody. Chie gets a divorce and began using her maiden name shortly afterwards.
197	4	"The Super Car's Trap (Part 1)"; Transliteration: "Suupaa Kaa no Wana (Zenpen)" (Japanese: スーパーカーの罠（前編）)	Kazuo Nogami	Toshiyuki Tabe	July 3, 2000
Kogoro wins the city lottery for first place and the reward was an all-expense paid vacation in a hotel and Conan and Ran tag along. In the hotel, a car exhibition is about to do its grand opening. When they a get to their room, Conan overhears a man on the phone talking about a "plan for the evening." The owner hires Kogoro to solve the mystery of who sent him a threatening letter. Later it was revealed that three guests in the hotel was scammed by the owner for their companies and their historic sports cars. Later in the evening, when the owner go outs for a drive he is not found until about 10:00 am during the next day, which also happens to be the day of the grand opening of the historic sports cars. He was found dead in the car and the cause of death of inhaling carbon monoxide intoxication. Later, Conan discovers that the man he overheard was the man who was scammed out of his car and claims that he went out for a drive while the owner did the same. However, one hour before he was found, Moore had phoned him and he was saying, "Where am I? Why is it so dark?" and Conan notices that the car window next the victim was slightly open.
198	5	"The Super Car's Trap (Part 2)"; Transliteration: "Suupaa Kaa no Wana (Kōhen)" (Japanese: スーパーカーの罠（後編）)	Mashu Ito	Toshiyuki Tabe	July 10, 2000
After investigating, Conan reveals that a cover was used to direct the fume into the car. He reveals the culprit is the hotel concierge. The culprit reveals that the victim scammed him out of his car, which he sent his company almost to bankruptcy to own.
199	6	"Kogoro Mouri, Suspect (Part 1)"; Transliteration: "Yougisha – Mōri Kogoro (Zenpen)" (Japanese: 容疑者·毛利小五郎（前編）)	Eiichi Kuboyama	N/A	July 17, 2000
Kogoro is relaxing at a luxury hotel but is interrupted by Ran after catching him staring at girls at the pool. Upon leaving, they run into Eri Kisaki who is meeting up with a few lawyers, namely Ritsuko Usui and Norifumi Saku, for a conference. Ritsuko and Norifumi attended school with Eri in the past. After dinner, a drunken Kogoro goes missing, prompting the others to search for him. Eri calls his phone, hears it ringing from the inside of Ritsuko's room, open the door with the chain lock in place, and find Ritsuko strangled to death. Worst of all, Kogoro emerges from the bed, much to everyone's shock. The investigation is led by Inspector Yamamura and Eri quickly discovers clues, including a crumpled memo saying "hayashi 2", suggesting that someone else killed Ritsuko and is using Kogoro as a scapegoat. Moreover, the "Do Not Disturb" and "pay later" signs left on the door have Conan wondering what culprit's intentions are.
200	7	"Kogoro Mouri, Suspect (Part 2)"; Transliteration: "Yougisha – Mōri Kogoro (Kōhen)" (Japanese: 容疑者·毛利小五郎（後編）)	Minoru Tozawa	N/A	July 24, 2000
Eri continues to pretend Kogoro is the killer but only to fool real guilty party. Norifumi enters a room he believed belonged to Ritsuko, but it is revealed to be a trap set by Conan and Eri who proceed to name him as Ritsuko's real killer. The "hayashi 2" memo meant Norifumi was unaware that Ritsuko had a meeting with a lawyer named Hayashi at 2 o'clock; he mistook it as hayashi rice for 2. The "pay later" note and "do not disturb" sign on the door was to prevent anyone walking by from ringing the door bell, possibly waking the drunk Kogoro up from his sleep. Norifumi strangled Ritsuko to death with the phone card, left Kogoro's phone near the door to frame him, and tampered with the chain lock; he broke it in advance then retied it with thread. Norifumi tackled through the door, thus breaking the chain and the thread. He was intending to make it look like a suicide but was forced to rethink a strategy once he found Kogoro in her bed. Norifumi confesses stating Ritsuko was torturing the people his home village and was furthered to murder once he discovered Ritsuko's plan to fabricate an affair with Kogoro, a scandal that would ruin Eri's career. Later, Kogoro tries to ask Eri to return home with him, since it has been a year after their divorce. Eri pretends not to hear and later at home, listens again to the recording of Mouri's plead for her return.
201	8	"The Tenth Passenger (Part 1)"; Transliteration: "Juuninme no Joukyaku (Zenpen)" (Japanese: 10人目の乗客（前編）)	Hiroshi Kurimoto	Junichi Miyashita	July 31, 2000
Conan, Ran, and Kogoro are riding a bonnet bus, driven by bus operator Mamoru Kajita and guided by Touko Natsume, through the mountains. On the bus already is the president of the Kagekura youth club, Takurou Yabe. The bus stops to pick up other travelers including deputy mayor Souchiki Okumura, who forces Kogoro out of his seat. He argues with Yabe then drinks from his water bottle and collapses dead from poison. Conan declares murder as a tiny hole is found in his bottle. Yabe is instantly blamed and questioned. A brawl between people of the opposite sides sparks but is stopped by Ran. The village's mayor, Takehiko Funaki, declares Yabe innocent and offers a million yen to Kogoro if he can solve the issues; Kogoro investigates, but no one cooperates with him. Later that night, Conan follows the inn hostess, Kinu Komai, to a memorial where she apologizes. Mayor Funaki is stabbed to death at the shrine, and the killer bumps into Ran while fleeing the scene.
202	9	"The Tenth Passenger (Part 2)"; Transliteration: "Juuninme no Joukyaku (Kōhen)" (Japanese: 10人目の乗客（後編）)	Nana Harada	Junichi Miyashita	August 7, 2000
Ran reveals that the person who ran past her after Funaki was killed was Yabe. Kogoro catches him but Yabe maintains his innocence. Conan gathers information from Kinu and Dr. Agasa who he had do research, discovering that two men, Kouhei Moritsugu and Youichi Tezukadi, died in the tragic bus accident 7 years prior. After learning that the bus has departed, Conan and Kuni rush over to try and stop it. Conan hops on board and reveals the killer to be the bus guide, Touko Natsume; her real name is Natsume Moritsugu and she is Kouhei's daughter. Natsume plans to murder everyone involved by tampering with the bus's brakes because they didn't help her father who tried to stop Tezukadi from harassing Kinu, the bus guide at the time, with the ensuing fight causing the accident in which the two men died as a result. Kinu was an intended victim but Natsume spared her because she apologized at her father's memorial. It is revealed that Okumura was at home sick and had nothing to do with past incident. Conan manages to stop the bus from crashing with his suspenders. The other passengers apologize as Natsume is arrested.
203	10	"The Black Wing of Icarus (Part 1)"; Transliteration: "Kuroi Ikarosu no Tsubasa (Zenpen)" (Japanese: 黒いイカロスの翼（前編）)	Hirohito Ochi	Chika Hashiba	August 14, 2000
Mouri, Ran, and Conan are staying at a hotel where they meet the twins from the case of the cursed mask. Later, an actress comes and causes trouble. The next day, she is found hanged in her room.
204	11	"The Black Wing of Icarus (Part 2)"; Transliteration: "Kuroi Ikarosu no Tsubasa (Kōhen)" (Japanese: 黒いイカロスの翼（後編）)	Kazuo Nogami	Chika Hashiba	August 21, 2000
Conan notices that this is not a suicide but a murder. He later proves that the culprit hang-glided to the hotel and went back by stowing in the trunk of a car. The culprit reveals that the actress caused his brother to spend much money and indirectly caused his death. He reveals he tried to ask the actress to say a few words on his brother's grave but she refused and he decided to kill her.
205	12	"Metropolitan Police Detective Love Story 3 (Part 1)"; Transliteration: "Honchou no Keiji Koi Monogatari 3 (Zenpen)" (Japanese: 本庁の刑事恋物語3（前編）)	Mashu Ito	N/A	August 28, 2000
A serial arsonist sets huge fires across the city and Takagi and Miwako with the Detective Boys are out to solve it. It turns out this is also the day the case of Miwako's father's death will be annulled, and the bank robber will be able to keep the money he stole from the bank. Miwako sets out to solve both cases before the day ends, but Takagi has been attacked by the arsonist.
206	13	"Metropolitan Police Detective Love Story 3 (Part 2)"; Transliteration: "Honchou no Keiji Koi Monogatari 3 (Kōhen)" (Japanese: 本庁の刑事恋物語3（後編）)	Minoru Tozawa	N/A	September 4, 2000
After Ai reveals the pattern of the arsonist attack, Ayumi, Genta, and Mitsuhiko run into the arsonist who attempts to kill them. Takagi is revealed to be inside the warehouse the arsonist set fire to. He can't break the handcuffs due to them being a memento from Miwako's dead father. Conan manages to arrive in time and stop the arsonist, but does not realize Takagi is in the burning warehouse. Meanwhile, the clock strikes midnight and the suspected bank robber explains everything to Miwako, saying how his father saved his life. Miwako reveals that due to the typhoon in Italy, the annul date was moved forward by one day. Takagi seemingly dies but appears with his handcuffs attached to the window bars. He collapses in Miwako's arms.
207	14	"The Deduction That Was Too Good"; Transliteration: "Migoto-sugita Meisuiri" (Japanese: 見事すぎた名推理)	Hiroshi Kurimoto	Nobuo Ogizawa	September 11, 2000
Kogoro is carried by Ran and accompanied by Conan one night picking him up from a bar. While walking they witness a fight in an apartment. The next day a murder occurs. One of the men who's heard arguing comes to Moore for help to prove his innocence. The man has made good suggestions on where to find evidence which are in fact too good. Conan finds out the man actually is the killer and is trying to trick Kogoro into proving his false alibi. Conan tranquilizes Kogoro and makes his deduction. The culprit confesses and reveals he betrayed the victim in a scam they were running killed him to avoid exposure.
208	15	"The Entrance to the Maze: The Anger of Colossus^{1 hr.}" Transliteration: "Meikyuu he no Iriguchi Kyodai Jinzou no Ikari" (Japanese: 迷宮への入り口 巨大神像の怒り)	Hirohito Ochi Satoshi Kuwabara	Chika Hashiba	October 9, 2000
Kogoro, Ran, and Conan are invited for a ceremony for a ropeway which is built through a giant Goddess Statue on the mountains by Doumouto Guze. They learn that there is a rumour about a curse by the goddess' anger and Kogoro was invited to disprove it. After riding through the ropeway on the opening day, Doumouto, who has disappeared from the ropeway cart, is later found dead on the goddess' hand. Conan realizes the trick for this impossible crime after checking the incinerator of the house near the statue. Conan reveals that their hostess was the murderer, who used Doumouto's trick against the news reporters against him. After completing his disappearing trick, he would've disproved of the curse by ruining the newspaper's reputation, but was stabbed. The culprit reveals that her brother was a construction worker who died because Doumouto forced his workers to complete the ropeway in a short amount of time.
209	16	"The Falling from Mt. Ryushin Case"; Transliteration: "Ryuushin-san Tenraku Jiken" (Japanese: 龍神山転落事件)	Eiichi Kuboyama	Satoshi Kitagawa	October 16, 2000
The Detective Boys excluding Ai, are traveling through a winding path on Mt Ryushin. There they witness a derailed car fall off the mountain. The man has died and through the evidence, Conan concludes another car rammed into that car. Conan decides to leave it to the police as they are trained for basic cases. Mitch finds a code from the car wreckage which he assumes has nothing to do with the incident because he presumed it was a normal accident. He hides it from Conan since he wants to solve it himself. Later at the cabin, he solves the code and takes Amy and George with him. There where he thinks is treasure, is culprit who caused the accident's hide-out. Conan and the Professor return to the cabin to find the kids missing. Conan solves the code quickly and arrives with the cops in time before the kids were murdered. Conan then helps the police find the evidence to convict the culprit of murder. Mitsuhiko, while chopping wood with Ayumi and George as punishment, complains how Conan solved the code so easily, while he only figured it out because it was in the book he was reading.
210	17	"The Water Palace of 5 Colors (Part 1)"; Transliteration: "Gozai Densetsu no Mizu-gotten (Zenpen)" (Japanese: 五彩伝説の水御殿（前編）)	Nana Harada	Takeshi Mochizuki	October 23, 2000
Kogoro, Ran, and Conan came as the substitutes for Serena and her father, the Suzuki president, and decided to attend a tea meeting at the Aonogi house. At the backyard of the mansion, there was a pond that shined in five colors. And there was a bridge which led to the tea room. While they were enjoying the pond's colors something unusual happened... The headmaster died in the tea room, the same way as the legend.
211	18	"The Water Palace of 5 Colors (Part 2)"; Transliteration: "Gozai Densetsu no Mizu-gotten (Kōhen)" (Japanese: 五彩伝説の水御殿（後編）)	Kazuo Nogami	Takeshi Mochizuki	October 30, 2000
Conan searches for clues to who murdered the Headmaster busily and finally figures out the trick that was used: the killer swam underneath the bridge, strangled the victim, and tied him in a complicated fisherman's knot that when the waterwheel turns, the body would be lifted up to the ceiling of the beam that would make it look like a suicide. The suspect's reason for killing the Headmaster was to stop him from officially announcing his son, Roichi, from becoming the next Headmaster, which he claims was the Headmaster betraying him since they were selling counterfeit expensive ceramics for the past ten years.
212	19	"Mushrooms, Bears, and the Detective Boys (Part 1)"; Transliteration: "Kinoko to Kuma to Tantei-dan (Zenpen)" (Japanese: きのこと熊と探偵団（前編）)	Minoru Tozawa	N/A	November 6, 2000
While mushroom picking in the Northeast mountains, Genta gets lost in a bear hunting area prompting the Detective Boys to split into two groups to search for him. During the search, Haibara and Mitsuhiko encounter the fresh corpse of a hunter in the woods and have become targets of the killer. The two befriend a cub during their isolation from the main group. Genta is found with the help of three additional hunters: Kiyoshi Yasaka, Matasaburo Saika, and Tomoya Negoro, all hunting Jubei, a large one-eyed Asiatic bear. Unfortunately, one of the hunters is the killer. Realizing they will be murdered if spotted, Haibara leaves mushrooms skewered on a stick as a message. The authorities find the corpse and also a burial for a cub. Conan catches wind and understands Haibara and Mitsuhiko's message and situation, confirming that the killer is among them. Jubei draws dangerously near.
213	20	"Mushrooms, Bears, and the Detective Boys (Part 2)"; Transliteration: "Kinoko to Kuma to Tantei-dan (Kōhen)" (Japanese: きのこと熊と探偵団（後編）)	Mashu Ito	N/A	November 13, 2000
Conan correctly deduces the killer's identity and goes to tranquilize him with his watch but decides against it. He explains that the message Haibara left with the mushrooms were mounted mimicking the way the suspects were carrying their rifles. Matasaburo Saika is the only one of the three shouldering his rifle on his right side. Matasaburo draws his weapon and fires in an attempt to deter Jubei, who arrives in a rampage. Conan reveals that Matasaburo wasn't harming Haibara and Mitsuhiko, he was saving them from Jubei because they befriended her cub. Matasaburo confesses how Jubei saved his life when he broke his legs and nearly froze to death, however, Jubei was shot, resulting in her losing an eye and retreating. Matasaburo has been spreading lies to keep people away from her. The murdered hunter, on the other hand, disgustingly killed one of Jubei's cub then hung the corpse in order to draw Jubei out, watching as Jubei frantically tried to take the cub's corpse down. The hunter was then killed by Matasaburo, and the cub given a burial. Matasaburo states that a man who kills a defenseless animal to draw out its mother is a monster and surrenders without resistance, giving Jubei's mountain one final look before being taken away.
214	21	"The Mysterious Retro Room Case"; Transliteration: "Retoro Ruumu no Nazo Jiken" (Japanese: レトロルームの謎事件)	Eiichi Kuboyama	Takeshi Mochizuki	November 20, 2000
Kogoro, Ran, and Conan are attending a dolphin show when a murder occurs in the hotel. The hotel room where the murder occurred was specially designed to be retro one. The clue to the murder is an automatic television that when inserted with a coin, will play for an hour. Conan reveals how the culprit used that to fake their alibi. The culprit confesses that her college scholarship was stolen by the victim.
215	22	"The Bay of Revenge (Part 1)"; Transliteration: "Bei Obu Ribenji (Zenpen)" (Japanese: ベイ·オブ·リベンジ （前編）)	Hiroshi Kurimoto	Toyoto Kogiso	November 27, 2000
While Kogoro, Ran, and Conan are driving near the ocean, their car breaks down, prompting them to ask for help at a house which belongs to famous lawyer Kensuke Tachibana. There, they meet secretary Yuuichi Sakuraba, his caretaker Yaeko Kamei, his wife Yuki Tachibana, his office's accountant Noriko Sugimura, and lawyer Fumio Fujisawa. As the day progresses, Kensuke explains to Kogoro that he's been receiving threatening letters from someone with the initials "T.K." Their dog, Yohan, has been acting weird. Kensuke leaves for his fishing trip, while the gang walks Yohan who continues acting strange when a suspicious person is seen riding a boat. Suddenly, Kensuke's boat capsizes and he drowns to death. They find out that Kensuke was killed by someone with the initials T.K. which later stands for Tatsuya Kumada, who had been sending threats to him. Five years ago, Kensuke acquitted Tatsuya of the murder of a man named Masahiko Tsuruta who was found hung in his house. Tatsuya is believed to be the killer. The investigation team rushes into his apartment and are horrified to find Kumada, their prime suspect, hanging from his ceiling.
216	23	"The Bay of Revenge (Part 2)"; Transliteration: "Bei Obu Ribenji (Kōhen)" (Japanese: ベイ·オブ·リベンジ （後編）)	Kazuo Nogami	Toyoto Kogiso	December 4, 2000
Conan believes that Kumada was met with foul play. He also finds out that a boat and anchor were stolen right before Kensuke's boat capsized. After visiting Masahiko's house, gaining insight from witnesses, and finding a dog house sign on the property, Conan puts Kogoro to sleep, deducing that the killer drugged Kensuke while he was out with Kumada. The killer disguised themselves as Kumada, lowered an anchor into the sea attached to the boat, then waited for the tide to rise. When this occurs, the anchor weighs the boat down making it capsize, and the unconscious Kensuke sinks to the bottom of the sea and drowns. Kumada was murdered in a similar fashion; he, too, was drugged and was pulled up via a noose around his neck. The killer is Yaeko Kamei, Kensuke's caretaker; her real name is Tamiko Tsuruta, and in turn, is revealed to be Masahiko's mother, the man who was murdered by Kumada. Evidence supporting these theories is how Yohan knew Yaeko even through her disguise. Yaeko confesses and though the case went to trial, Kensuke, knowing every detail in Masahiko's death, acquitted Kumada of the murder for profit. She is arrested for her murders.
217	24	"Megure's Sealed Secret (Part 1)"; Transliteration: "Fuuin-sareta Megure no Himitsu (Zenpen)" (Japanese: 封印された目暮の秘密（前編）)	Minoru Tozawa	N/A	December 11, 2000
Michiko Ishiguro is gravely injured when a man bashes her in the head with a metal bat as she leaves a phone booth. Later that day, while accompanying Sonoko on her shopping spree, Kogoro is mistakenly attacked by Sato, Megure, and Takagi as part of a stakeout. They inform Kogoro about a serial offender attacking women wearing ganguro makeup. According to the victims' testimony, their attacker stood at 150 centimeters tall. Kogoro mentions a similar case 20 years ago where female high school students were run over, shocking Megure. At the department store's underground parking lot, Ran discovers Tae Aizawa dead. Tae fits the demographic of the past victims. It is revealed that Tae was involved in another case where she struck and killed a boy named Akira Sakurai. Suspects in Tae's murder are her boyfriend Noriyuki Shirakawa, his father Haruyoshi, Yuri Konno, and security guard Yoshio Sadakane. When Conan provides useful points, Sato dresses up in her decoy outfit and Megure snaps at the idea, causing Conan to wonder why.
218	25	"Megure's Sealed Secret (Part 2)"; Transliteration: "Fuuin-sareta Megure no Himitsu (Kōhen)" (Japanese: 封印された目暮の秘密（後編）)	Kazuo Nogami	N/A	December 18, 2000
It is revealed that all the victims were in their cars before being attacked. Sonoko, wearing platform boots, goes to use the bathroom, unaware of the killer following her. Conan gives his theory and declares that Yoshio Sadakane is the killer; since he is a security guard, he can observe who was wearing platform boots. Due to Tae being a minor when she killed Akira, Yoshio could not track her name and address due to the law. He became enraged and attacked any girl fitting Tae's physical description. Yoshio prepares to murder Sonoko but Megure shields her and takes the blow to the head. After receiving a stern lecture about his actions and crime from a profusely bleeding Megure, Yoshio confesses; all he wanted was for Tae Aizawa to apologize for killing his son, Akira. Afterwards, Megure reveals a case in the past which is why he was so anxious. In the past a man was attacking girls with long skirts and a girl offered to be a decoy; she was badly injured along with Megure, leaving scars on both of them. The girl is revealed to be Midori, Megure's wife in the future.
219	26	"The Detectives Gathered Together! Shinichi Kudo vs. Kid the Phantom Thief^{2 hrs.}" / "The Gathering of the Detectives! Shinichi Kudo vs. Kaito Kid"; Transliteration: "Atsumerareta Meitantei! Kudō Shinichi VS Kaitō Kiddo" (Japanese: 集められた名探偵!工藤新一VS怪盗キッド)	Masato Sato	N/A	January 8, 2001
The Phantom Thief Kid stands on top of a building with his butler. He discusses the time he was almost caught by a famous Detective in the East, Shinichi Kudo. He plans to "steal" the clock tower. Although, he leaves it standing with a code upon its hands, saying "I will not give this clock to anyone". After the reminisce, Kid plans to steal the priceless gem of the Suzuki Corporation: the Black Star. Afterwards, Kogoro has been invited to a detective meeting by an unknown assailant who sends him money. There are six detectives there excluding Conan. They are in a house in the isolated Shizuoka Prefecture mountains, an Inaka Village at 2 km from Okuno Dam and six miles from a lonely gas station, where a massacre happened forty years ago. One of the detectives are killed and they are stranded in the mansion as the bridge has been cut and the cars have been burned. One by one, the detectives seem to be dying and Rachel and a maid are attacked. Secretly, Detective Senma, an elderly lady, has been watching through the surveillance cameras and Conan sends her a message claiming to be the seventh detective. She arrives at the place Conan asked to meet her at and he reveals the truth about both this and the case from forty years ago. Afterwards, he reveals that the entire mansion is made of gold, as it was named Sunset Mansion. Later, as they leave via helicopter, Detective Senma jumps down from the helicopter and Kogoro jumps down on her, revealing his identity as the Phantom Thief Kid.

== Notes ==
- ^1 hr. One hour long special episode.
- ^2 hrs. Two hour long special episode.
