= Case Closed season 6 =

Season of television series

Case Closed
- Season 6
- The cover of the first DVD compilation for season six of Detective Conan released by Shogakukan
- No. of episodes: 28

Release
- Original network: NNS (ytv)
- Original release: February 15 – September 27, 1999

Season chronology
- ← Previous; Season 5 Next → Season 7

The sixth season of the Case Closed anime was directed by Yasuichiro Yamamoto and produced by TMS-Kyokuichi and Yomiuri Telecasting Corporation. The series is based on Gosho Aoyama's Case Closed manga series. In Japan, the series is titled Detective Conan (名探偵コナン, Meitantei Conan) but was changed due to legal issues with the title Detective Conan. The episodes' plot follows the adventures of Conan Edogawa.

The episodes use four pieces of theme music: two opening themes and two closing themes. The first opening theme is "Truth ~Great Detective of Love~" by Two-Mix until episode 142. The second opening theme is "Giri Giri Chop" (ギリギリ Chop, lit. "Barely Chop") by B'z and is used for the rest of the season. The first ending theme is "Still for your love" by Rumania Montevideo until episode 152. It is followed by "Free Magic" by Wag for the rest of the season.

The season initially ran from February 15, 1999, through September 27, 1999, on Nippon Television Network System in Japan. Episodes 135 to 162 were later collected into seven DVD compilations by Shogakukan. They were released between October 25, 2000, and December 15, 2000, in Japan.

== Episode list ==
No. overall	No. in season	Title	Directed by	Written by	Original release date
135	1	"The Disappearing Weapon Case"; Transliteration: "Kieta Kyōki Sousaku Jiken" (Japanese: 消えた凶器捜索事件)	Minoru Tozawa	Kazunari Kochi	February 15, 1999
The Detective Boys accompany Ayumi Yoshida to Mitsue Mika, her barber, for a haircut. They discover that Mika died after being strangled by an unknown culprit. While the police investigate, Conan notices the blue plastic on Mika's neck and realizes she was strangled with a clothes hanger. Conan is certain Mika's boss, Futou Midori, is the murderer but lacks the evidence to prove it. The Detective Boys search for the hanger and find out that a crow has taken it to make a nest. The police then convict Midori for Mika's murder. Midori reveals that Mika was going to abandon her to pursue a higher career even though Midori was the one who trained her to be a barber. Later that day, the Detective Boys are attacked by crows who seek revenge for the stolen hanger.
136	2	"The Old Blue Castle Investigation Case (Part 1)"; Transliteration: "Ao no Kojō Tansaku Jiken (Zenpen)" (Japanese: 青の古城探索事件（前編）)	Yoshio Suzuki	N/A	February 22, 1999
The Detective Boys are on a camping trip but Dr. Agasa forgot the tent. They wander to a castle owned by Masuyo Mamiya, meet Katsuo Tabata, Mitsuru Mamiya, Takahito Mamiya, and learn that there's a secret treasure somewhere inside. Conan finds a clue to the treasure and enters a secret passage but is attacked by an unknown assailant. The group searches for Conan but stop to eat dinner. It is there that Mitsuru tells them about the tower that burned to the ground; Mrs. Mamiya, her friends, some servants, and Mutsumi Nishikawa, one of Masuyo's maids are among those who died in that fire. A rumored curse was placed by Mrs. Mamiya with fatal consequences to those who went near the tower. As such, Mitsuri's assistant went to investigate and starved to death after becoming lost in the forest. Agasa is about to call the police to investigate but is knocked out by the culprit.
137	3	"The Old Blue Castle Investigation Case (Part 2)"; Transliteration: "Ao no Kojō Tansaku Jiken (Kōhen)" (Japanese: 青の古城探索事件（後編）)	Hirohito Ochi	N/A	March 1, 1999
Haibara leads the investigation and is accompanied by the Detective Boys. They enter the same secret passage as Conan did and wander out of another one. Genta and Mitsuhiko are captured by the culprit. Haibara and Ayumi continue further into the abandoned tower and discover the corpse belonging to the grand mistress. After a lengthy chase, Haibara puts the pieces together and reveals the culprit to be Mutsumi Nishikawa. She murdered Mrs. Mamiya, the others, faked her death, underwent plastic surgery, and assumed Masuyo's identity after finding her dead, just to search for the hidden treasure in the castle. Mutsumi grabs the girls and tries to kill them. Conan, Mitsuhiko, Dr. Agasa, and Genta appear. After reuniting with everyone, Conan reveals the location of the treasure, which literally is the castle holding a beautiful scene over the valley. Mutsumi, completely devastated and realizing the time and magnitude of her crimes, comes into terms that she wasted 10 years and killed a huge number of people just for this. She is later arrested.
138	4	"The Final Screening Murder Case (Part 1)"; Transliteration: "Saigo no Jouei Satsujin Jiken (Zenpen)" (Japanese: 最後の上映殺人事件（前編）)	Koichi Sasaki	N/A	March 8, 1999
The Detective Boys, accompanied with Dr. Agasa, attend the final opening day of a theater as it is about to be demolished. They meet the theater owner, Akio Muramatsu, and his employees Minoru Furuhashi and Yuriko Tomosato. Seiji Haruta, a sadistic real estate agent, arrives and announces his plan to tear the theater down to make way for new business. During the second Gomera film, Seiji begins terrorizing patrons until an unseen character attacks him from behind; his gasp go unnoticed due to the loud volume. Haibara feels a cool breeze, college student Toshiyuki Ide is caught bootlegging the film, and a shadow is cast in front of the screen. When the lights turn on, Seiji is found hanging in front of the projector. Conan finds clues to declare murder but everyone has a strong alibi. When Mitsuhiko proclaims he saw Yuriko looking at herself in the mirror, Conan believes there is more to her story than she is willing to speak on.
139	5	"The Final Screening Murder Case (Part 2)"; Transliteration: "Saigo no Jouei Satsujin Jiken (Kōhen)" (Japanese: 最後の上映殺人事件（後編）)	Nana Harada	N/A	March 15, 1999
After gaining sufficient evidence and reviewing Toshiyuki's video, Conan uses Dr. Agasa's voice to shed light on the matter at hand and reveals that Minoru is the killer. The Detective Boys recreate the murder while Conan elaborates how Minoru used the movie projector to fabricate an alibi. After killing Seiji off-screen, Minoru returned to the projection room and used the mirrors to reflect the light from one window to the other, which had Seiji's corpse hung in front of it. The air conditioner caused the corpse to sway. The entire incident is caught on Toshiyuki's camera; after the shadow was shown, the film was shaky and knocked out of focus due to Minoru moving the mirror back to its original window. Yuriko went to the bathroom to use the mirror because there were none in the projection room, unintentionally giving Minoru and his methods away. Minoru confesses that he was driven to murder due to Seiji being the cause of low patronage. Before he leaves, Minoru asks to finish the final screening of the theater for the Detective Boys. In the end, Akio decides not to sell the theater, as the children reminded him the magic of theaters.
140	6	"SOS! Message from Ayumi"; Transliteration: "SOS! Ayumi Kara no Messeiji" (Japanese: SOS!歩美からのメッセージ)	Minoru Tozawa	Kazunari Kochi	April 12, 1999
There is a burglar on the loose! But Ayumi is sick so she stays home. When a burglar invades her house, she tries using the detective badge to call for help. Ayumi uses her alarm clock to communicate a code to the Detective Boys. Conan realizes that a burglar is in her home and Conan manages to stop him with the Detective Boys.
141	7	"The Night Before the Wedding Locked Room Case (Part 1)"; Transliteration: "Kekkon Zenya no Misshitsu Jiken (Zenpen)" (Japanese: 結婚前夜の密室事件（前編）)	Yoshio Suzuki	N/A	April 19, 1999
Heiji and Kazuha visit Tokyo accompanied by Kogoro, Ran, and Conan. They run into Heiji's father's friend and are invited to their mansion. There a murder occurs and his father's friend is found dead in a locked room. It seems he was dragged to another room after being stabbed in the heart.
142	8	"The Night Before the Wedding Locked Room Case (Part 2)"; Transliteration: "Kekkon Zenya no Misshitsu Jiken (Kōhen)" (Japanese: 結婚前夜の密室事件（後編）)	Hirohito Ochi	N/A	April 26, 1999
Continuing the investigation, Heiji proclaims the butler was the murderer and he is taken away, screaming his innocence. Late that night, an unknown man takes the murder weapon and tries to place it in a bag, but is caught by Heiji and Conan who reveal that they placed the blame on the butler to lure out the true culprit. The culprit reveals that he murdered the man because he tried to cancel the wedding and take his love away from him.
143	9	"The Suspicious Astronomical Observation"; Transliteration: "Giwaku no Tentaikansoku" (Japanese: 疑惑の天体観測)	Koichi Sasaki	Manabu Harada	May 3, 1999
Ran, Serena, and Conan go to watch the stars. Serena is especially hoping that she will see a shooting star. Ran has a friend at the observatory that helps her use a telescope; he introduces his senpais that work at the observatory. One of them just won an award known as the "Star Pioneer". However, that same night, that same person falls from the higher level of the observatory. Conan knows that this isn't an accident - but how can he prove it?
144	10	"The North Star No. 3 Express Leaving Ueno (Part 1)"; Transliteration: "Ueno-hatsu Hokutosei Sango (Zenpen)" (Japanese: 上野発北斗星3号（前編）)	Nana Harada	N/A	May 10, 1999
Conan, Kogoro, and Ran take the overnight North Star Express to Hokkaido to meet a former client. On the train, they meet up with a series of people: Toshinori Kaetsu, Akishige Ishizuchi, Toru Aoba, and Azusa Izumo, Yasuji Asama, and Keitaro Izumo. As the train ride progresses, Yasuji apparently shoots Keitaro in the head, killing him instantly, and escapes through the window. The train stops and the group finds Yasuji dead in what appears to be an unfortunate accident. Conan notices that the events is eerily similar to the plot of an unpublished novel written by his father, Yusaku, that had been stolen ten years prior. He is unable to contact Yusaku to confirm his suspicions and takes the case into his own hands. A mysterious woman is seen watching Conan from afar.
145	11	"The North Star No. 3 Express Leaving Ueno (Part 2)"; Transliteration: "Ueno-hatsu Hokutosei Sango (Kōhen)" (Japanese: 上野発北斗星3号（後編）)	Minoru Tozawa	N/A	May 17, 1999
Conan reveals the suspicious woman to be his mother, Yukiko Kudo. When Kogoro calls all the passengers to witness his inaccurate deduction, Conan figures out the trick. He recalls that in the novel, the man who solved the case was killed by the trap he set for the criminal. Yukiko volunteers to act as a decoy to help him find the proof. When the train lands at Sapporo Station, however, Conan and Yukiko are separated and the criminal moves, intending to push her onto the tracks. Yusaku appears just in time and reveals the truth: passenger Toshinori Kaetsu is the killer. Toshinori bludgeoned Yasuji to death, then rigged the window and hung his corpse outside with fishing line. He came back, disguised himself as Yasuji, shot Keitaro to death, jumped out the window during the chase, and cut the line which releases Yasuji's corpse, framing him for the murder. As evidence, Toshinori has the disguise in his luggage. Toshinori, who had idolized Yusaku's work, confesses and states that Keitaro and Yasuji robbed his own jewelry store. His girlfriend, who was an employee there, was kidnapped later murdered by Yasuji. He reveals he stole Yusaku's unfinished novel to use for his murders and is arrested. Yusaku and Yukiko fly back to Los Angeles.
146	12	"Metropolitan Police Detective Love Story (Part 1)"; Transliteration: "Honchō no Keiji Koi Monogatari (Zenpen)" (Japanese: 本庁の刑事恋物語（前編）)	Yoshio Suzuki	N/A	May 24, 1999
The Detective Boys go to the police station trying to figure out who robbed a nearby bank. Keizo Masuo, the bank owner, phones his wife, Kayo, and gives the phone to Detective Takagi so he can speak with her. Suddenly, Kayo screams, prompting the group to rush to her aid. They enter the house while Keizo demands they look in different locations. Keizo finds Kayo stabbed in the back; the entire room is ransacked with books and the bookshelf on the floor, suggesting a struggle between Kayo and her killer. Conan finds the murder and robbery cases are related. A fresh bloodstain is found on top of the bookshelf. Evidence points to an outsider, but Conan is forced to rethink from square one when he catches Keizo looking at Kayo's corpse, with a haunting smile.
147	13	"Metropolitan Police Detective Love Story (Part 2)"; Transliteration: "Honchō no Keiji Koi Monogatari (Kōhen)" (Japanese: 本庁の刑事恋物語（後編）)	Nana Harada	N/A	May 31, 1999
Conan continues his investigation, closing in on Keizo, his prime suspect in the stabbing death of his wife, Kayo. With all pieces of the crime in place, Conan understands the hidden truth and drops hints for the officers. Sato, Shiratori, and Takagi reveal that Keizo murdered his wife while at the police station; knowing his wife's routine, Keizo tied fishing line to Kayo's exercise bike and to a knife hidden in the bookshelf. When Kayo petals, the string winds up, pulling the bookshelf and knife down, effectively stabbing and killing her instantly. After arriving, Keizo directed the officers in one direction while he went to the crime scene and destroyed evidence. As proof, Keizo pricked his finger with a pin that releases the string causing it to bleed as he removed the bookshelf from his wife's corpse. Keizo confesses stating that he planned the robbery of his own bank for Kayo who lived a lavish lifestyle. However, she was held hostage during the robbery and recognized one of the culprits, which would eventually reveal Keizo as the mastermind. Two hours later, the robbers are arrested, along with Keizo.
148	14	"The Sudden Street Car Stopping Case"; Transliteration: "Rōmen Densha Kyūteishi Jiken" (Japanese: 路面電車急停止事件)	Kazuo Nogami	Masaki Sakurai	June 7, 1999
Conan and the Detective Boys wake up at 5:30 in the morning to go get in line for a roller coaster ride. There are only three other people on the train, all of them are trainspotters. One of the photographers waits outside so he can take pictures of the train coming towards him; suddenly, the ladder underneath him tips over and he falls onto the track. The train conductor quickly applies the emergency brakes, and everybody rushes out of the train to find him unhurt. However, when Conan comes back into the train to continue their journey, they find one of the other photographers dead. While the officer in charge of the case sees the death as an accident caused by the sudden stop, Conan doesn’t believe it, and finds evidence the other photographer’s fall was no accident either. Conan then drops hints to the officer allowing him to deduce the truth. The third photographer was the killer; she rigged up a trap in advance and caused the photographer outside to fall as a distraction while she bludgeoned the photographer who was inside with a heavy camera case. However, the case is tied differently than it was before and there is blood on it from where the culprit cut her hand during the murder. The culprit confesses and reveals that she and the victim were dating but he was about to move to Germany to enter an arranged marriage with someone else.
149	15	"The Amusement Park Bungee Jumping Case"; Transliteration: "Yūenchi Banjii Jiken" (Japanese: 遊園地パンジー事件)	Koichi Sasaki	Hiroshi Kashiwabara Hiro Chikatoki	June 21, 1999
At an amusement park, an accident occurs during a Kamen Yaiba playing. As Yaiba jumped from a bungee cord, the cord burns and he falls into the water. 20 minutes later, he is found dead. Conan realizes that the Yaiba who jumped was the criminal who killed the Yaiba actor beforehand. The culprit reveals he did so because he was told he could not act as Yaiba.
150	16	"The Truth of the Exploding Car Case (Part 1)"; Transliteration: "Jidōsha Bakuhatsu Jiken no Shinsō (Zenpen)" (Japanese: 自動車爆発事件の真相（前編）)	Hirohito Ochi	Kazunari Kochi	June 28, 1999
Kogoro reveals that he tutored in his youth, and resolves to meet up with one of his students. However, when they go see her, her car suddenly explodes as her sister drives it out of the driveway. Kogoro is determined to solve the case and find the murderer as soon as possible. At the end, he appears to solve the case, but Conan believes there is a little more to it than the simple explanation he gives.
151	17	"The Truth of the Exploding Car Case (Part 2)"; Transliteration: "Jidōsha Bakuhatsu Jiken no Shinsō (Kōhen)" (Japanese: 自動車爆発事件の真相（後編）)	Minoru Tozawa	Kazunari Kochi Hiro Chikatoki	July 5, 1999
With some prodding by Conan, Kogoro surprisingly finds the truth of the case himself. He confronts the criminal, and with some help from Conan, he overcomes his ideals and gets to the heart of the matter.
152	18	"The Mysterious Old Man Disappearance Case"; Transliteration: "Nazo no Rōjin Shissō Jiken" (Japanese: 謎の老人失踪事件)	Yoshio Suzuki	Junichi Miyashita	July 12, 1999
While on the bus home, Ran meets an old man who later disappears. Later she finds a MO disk in her purse with secret information about fraud involving several companies. Conan realizes the old man must've been followed and captured. After Serena is kidnapped, Conan manages to find out where the culprits are hiding, and saves her and the old man.
153	19	"Sonoko's Dangerous Summer Story (Part 1)"; Transliteration: "Sonoko no Abunai Natsumonogatari (Zenpen)" (Japanese: 園子のアブない夏物語（前編）)	Nana Harada	N/A	July 19, 1999
In an attempt to find a man and fix her love life, Sonoko goes to the beach with Ran and Conan where they run into 3 men: a seemingly rude waiter, Kyogoku Makoto, a fat man who has been following Sonoko, Terabayashi Shouji, and college student Tadahiko Michiwaki. Tadahiko asks Sonoko out to lunch, where he tells her about a brown-haired woman who was murdered a year ago. The story frightens Ran and they leave, taking pictures as they wait for a train blocking their way to pass. The group is horrified to discover that a brown-haired woman was recently murdered, eerily in the same fashion as told in Tadahiko's story. While staying at a motel, Sonoko is attacked after she finds a mysterious culprit searching through her bags. Sonoko bites her attacker on, what she describes, his hairy bicep. Conan wonders why Sonoko was attacked and what could be on her camera that would have her targeted.
154	20	"Sonoko's Dangerous Summer Story (Part 2)"; Transliteration: "Sonoko no Abunai Natsumonogatari (Kōhen)" (Japanese: 園子のアブない夏物語（後編）)	Kazuo Nogami	N/A	July 26, 1999
After talking with Tadahiko, Sonoko falls asleep in the car, and someone puts it in drive. Conan and Ran rescue her from going off the cliff. Later, they encounter Terabayashi who chases them in the woods where they split up, but he is revealed to be a detective working on the serial murder case. Conan goes with Ran, and Sonoko goes with Tadahiko. When Sonoko discovers a bite mark on Tadahiko, he reveals himself to be the serial killer which, at the same time, Terabayashi reveals that Tadahiko has already murdered four other women; Sonoko bit his leg, not his arm as she initially thought. Tadahiko's girlfriend dumped him, who also had brown hair, resulting in him killing brown-haired girls. He attempted to murder Sonoko by shifting the hand brake and putting ice under the wheel of his car. When the ice melts, the car moves in the direction of the cliff. False evidence is placed to fool people that someone broke in his car. Tadahiko fell under the impression that Sonoko took a picture while he killed his latest victim near the railroad tracks, which is where the lights came from, and planned to show Shinichi. Makoto suddenly appears and defeats Tadahiko who is arrested. Ran remembers that he was at a karate competition, who was known as The Prince of Attack.
155	21	"The Underwater Locked Room Case"; Transliteration: "Suichū no Kagi Misshitsu Jiken" (Japanese: 水中の鍵密室事件)	Koichi Sasaki	Kazunari Kochi	August 2, 1999
Kogoro, Ran, and Conan pay a visit to an old woman whom Kogoro lived with during his college years. She decides to take them to her grandson, but he's found dead when they get into the house. The bathroom door is locked however. How could this have happened? Rather than use Kogoro for the case, Conan solves this one as himself, demonstrating how the victim’s downstairs neighbor used his pet beetles to move the key after he left. The neighbor confesses he killed the victim because he was going to expose their drug dealing.
156	22	"Metropolitan Police Detective Love Story 2 (Part 1)"; Transliteration: "Honchō no Keiji Koi Monogatari 2 (Zenpen)" (Japanese: 本庁の刑事恋物語2（前編）)	Minoru Tozawa	N/A	August 9, 1999
Detective Sato is chasing a murderer through the school building where Conan, Haibara, Ayumi, Mitsuhiko, and Genta happen to be in. After cornering him, she accidentally handcuffs him to her between a toilet handle, trapping them. The man proclaims he is innocent and that needs to get on a plane tomorrow to attend his daughter's wedding. She tells Takagi to solve the case before the time and not to inform the police. The Tokyo police department send out a massive manhunt for the suspect, Sato, and Takagi.
157	23	"Metropolitan Police Detective Love Story 2 (Part 2)"; Transliteration: "Honchō no Keiji Koi Monogatari 2 (Kōhen)" (Japanese: 本庁の刑事恋物語2（後編）)	Hirohito Ochi	N/A	August 16, 1999
With the help of Conan, Haibara, Ayumi, Mitsuhiko, and Genta, the case is solved; the suspect was framed by his friend, who was in a relationship with the victim and wanted out. However, the building Sato and the suspect is trapped in is about to be blown up. With all the ruckus of the people, they are unable to warn Agasa who created a special bomb called Tropical Rainbow, a bomb that explodes with all the colors of the rainbow. Conan manages to knock Agasa out before he pushes the button to demolish the building. Takagi is also extremely relieved when he finds out that Sato only sees Inspector Megure as a fatherly figure.
158	24	"The Silent Loop Line"; Transliteration: "Chinmoku no Kanjosen" (Japanese: 沈黙の環状線)	Nana Harada	Takeshi Mochizuki	August 23, 1999
Kogoro, Ran, and Conan are waiting for the train when they notice a group of people leaving work on a Sunday. Once they boarded the train the group finds their co-worker dead in an empty train car. After all three are presented as possible suspects Conan notices a couple of clues, there is a mark on her ear and a line on her arm. Before long Conan stuns Kogoro and reveals who did it and the evidence used to prove their guilt. The victim was killed by a poisoned needle in the headphone lining which injected the poison into her ear. The culprit confesses she did it because the victim stole her boyfriend.
159	25	"The Bizarre Legend of the Five Storied Pagoda (Part 1)"; Transliteration: "Kaiki Gojūnotō Densetsu (Zenpen)" (Japanese: 怪奇五重塔伝説（前編）)	Kazuo Nogami	Kenji Saito	September 6, 1999
Kogoro, Ran, and Conan are visitors at the 5 story pagoda. After running into the manager, they are invited out to dinner as guest of the temple on him, thanks to the Great Kogoro. The morning after hearing the legend of 5 story pagoda, the manager (who was planning on turning it into a tourist attraction) turns up dead, hanging from the top floor, in a fashion mimicking the legend. Suspicions point to suicide as the means of death. Conan spots the manager's tie clip at the end of the episode and knows it was murder, and only one of four people could be responsible.
160	26	"The Bizarre Legend of the Five Storied Pagoda (Part 2)"; Transliteration: "Kaiki Gojūnotō Densetsu (Kōhen)" (Japanese: 怪奇五重塔伝説（後編）)	Koichi Sasaki	Kenji Saito	September 13, 1999
More evidence presents itself as Conan notices there are burn marks on the rope used to hang him, and also a slip knot tied. In addition, there was not enough length in the rope meaning, he would have needed to jump into the noose to commit suicide. Right before the police detective was going to call it a suicide case, Conan stuns Kogoro and reveals the method in which the murder was committed, followed by the key piece of evidence to prove who the murderer was. The killer was the tour guide, who had a receipt for cigars the manager purchased earlier that night. The murder was because the tour guide was being framed for the manager’s tax fraud.
161	27	"The Murder Floating in the Water Stream Restaurant"; Transliteration: "Ryūsuitei ni Nagareru Satsui" (Japanese: 流水亭に流れる殺意)	Minoru Tozawa	Takao Isami	September 20, 1999
Kogoro, Ran, and Conan are at a fancy traditional Japanese restaurant where food is delivered on a small computer controlled boat that navigates over a running stream around the restaurant. Meanwhile, a professor invites two colleagues to the restaurant to celebrate one of them being promoted to his assistant. Later, the promoted man is murdered and Conan realizes the only way it could have been possible was for a person to be alone, and to use the stream to access the room. Conan later reveals that the professor hid in the boats and came out to murder the victim. The professor confesses how he was blackmailed over plagiarism by the victim who demanded the promotion and a large payment from him.
162	28	"The Case of the Flying Locked Room, Shin'ichi Kudou's First Case^{1 hr.}" / "The Sealed Chamber in the Sky: Shinichi Kudo's First Case"; Transliteration: "Sora Tobu Misshitsu Kudō Shinichi Saisho no Jiken" (Japanese: 空飛ぶ密室 工藤新一最初の事件)	Masato Sato	N/A	September 27, 1999
Agasa wins a trip to a beach resort and gives the tickets to Kogoro, Ran, and the Detective Boys. On the plane, Ran falls asleep and dreams about a murder that occurred on an Airliner. In the past, a photographer named Kazuhiro Ootaka is found dead in the bathroom. Shinichi reveals that Ootaka was put to sleep and was killed by having a thin metal object dipped in poison and having it injected into the back of his head. Megure gathers four people who have entered the bathroom during that time and search them for a weapon but to no avail. After a thorough investigation, Shinichi reveals Tsugumi Amano, Ootaka's girlfriend to be the murderer. Shinichi reveals that Amano used a sharpened brassiere wire to commit the murder. Amano confesses and reveals that Ootaka set a building on fire for pictures which inadvertently caused her brother's death.

== Notes ==
- ^1 hr. The episode was aired as a single hour long episode in Japan
