= Case Closed season 5 =

Case Closed
- Season 5
- The cover of the DVD compilation released by FUNimation Entertainment of the fifth season
- No. of episodes: 28 (Japanese); 18 (English)

Release
- Original network: NNS (ytv)
- Original release: June 29, 1998 – February 8, 1999

Season chronology
- ← Previous; Season 4 Next → Season 6

The fifth season of the Case Closed anime was directed by Kenji Kodama (until episode 118) and Yasuichiro Yamamoto (since episode 119) and produced by TMS-Kyokuichi and Yomiuri Telecasting Corporation. The series is based on Gosho Aoyama's Case Closed manga series. In Japan, the series is titled Detective Conan (名探偵コナン, Meitantei Conan) but was changed due to legal issues with the title Detective Conan. The episodes' plot continues Jimmy Kudo's life as a young child named Conan Edogawa and introduces the character Ai Haibara/Vi Graythorn.

The episodes use five pieces of theme music: two opening themes and three closing themes. The first Japanese opening theme "Unmei no Roulette Mawashite" (運命のルーレット廻して, lit. Spinning the Roulette of Destiny) by Zard until episode 123. The second opening theme is "Truth (A Great Detective of Love)" by Two-Mix for the rest of the season. The first ending theme is "Negai Goto Hitotsu Dake" (願い事ひとつだけ, lit. Only One Wish) by Miho Komatsu until episode 108. The second ending theme, starting on episode 109, is "Kōri no ue ni Tatsu yō ni" (氷の上に立つように, lit. Standing on Ice) by Miho Komatsu until episode 131. The third ending theme is "Still for Your Love" by Rumania Montevideo for the rest of the season. The English adaption of season five opening theme was "Spinning the Roulette of Destiny" up until episode 130, and no further dubbed episodes have been released. The English adaptions ending themes were "Negai Goto Hitotsu Dake" until episode 114 and followed by "Kōri no ue ni Tatsu yō ni" until episode 130.

The season initially ran from June 29, 1998, through February 8, 1999, on Nippon Television Network System in Japan. Episodes 107 to 134 were later collected into eight DVD compilations by Shogakukan that were released on March 24, 2006. The season was later licensed and dubbed by FUNimation Entertainment and released in a DVD box set containing episodes one hundred-six to one hundred thirty, one hundred to one twenty-three in the Japanese numbering. The Viridian edition of the season was released on March 23, 2010.

Episodes 128 and 129 were dubbed by Studio Nano as part of a curated episode list, which was released on Crunchyroll and Netflix on July 3, 2025.

== Episode listing ==
Orig.^{Jp.}	Funi.^{Eng.}	No. in season	Crunchyroll translated title/Funimation title Original Japanese title	Directed by	Written by	Original release date
107	113	1	"The Mystery of the Mole Alien (Part 1)" / "The Mystery Moletian Case (Part 1)"; Transliteration: "Mogura Seijin Nazo no Jiken (Zenpen)" (Japanese: モグラ星人謎の事件（前編）)	Yasuichiro Yamamoto	Kazunari Kochi	June 29, 1998
Matthew Kohler, a co-star of the Masked Yaiba show, has come forth to Richard asking for help to find his sister Celia, who he believes was murdered and buried in the backyard of a man named Walter Rivers, Celia's last client before she disappeared. He suggests they dig around when Walter leaves for his Saturday treatment at a local hospital. Unfortunately, Richard declines due to a lack of evidence that a crime had been committed. The Junior Detective League, having already met Walter once attempting to get their baseball, goes to Walter's house to stop Matthew should he decide to take matters into his own hands, but they are shocked to learn that he is in police custody after just robbing a jewelry store. Conan wonders why Matthew left his getaway car where it could be spotted easily, why he didn't bother covering his face, and notes the manhole near Walter's house and the construction site.
108	114	2	"The Mystery of the Mole Alien (Part 2)" / "The Mystery Moletian Case (Part 2)"; Transliteration: "Mogura Seijin Nazo no Jiken (Kōhen)" (Japanese: モグラ星人謎の事件（後編）)	Kazuo Nogami	Kazunari Kochi	July 6, 1998
Matthew happily explains that he buried the stolen jewels in Walter's yard, forcing the police to excavate it. Though they find no body, Conan is positive that Walter murdered Celia Kohler just by the evil smirk on his face. The Junior Detective League asks a witness, Sean Moss, who heard digging noises from Walter's yard on the day Celia went missing. Sean made a mistake and the noise was actually coming from the construction site next door. Conan, after summoning everyone back to Walter's house, lays down his theory and points out the body is under a growing flower which sprouted from the victim received as a gift on the day she went missing. Walter admits defeat and confesses, explaining that Celia's death was accidental; as he went back to his room after learning he lost money due to an error on Celia's part, Celia tried to stop him but Walter yanked his hand back, causing her to lose balance and fall to her death. Her body is unearthed and Matthew, only given probation for his robbery case, heads back home to give Celia a proper burial.
109	115	3	"The Great Detective League Pursuit Case" / "Hit and Run"; Transliteration: "Tantei-dan Daitsuiseki Jiken" (Japanese: 探偵団大追跡事件)	Hirohito Ochi	Junichi Miyashita	July 13, 1998
After the Junior Detective League successfully takes down a robber, Amy is hit by a red car that speeds away passing a factory, but they find it again minutes later to chase it to a police station where a man named Kenny Sheen turns himself in for his crime. At the hospital, Amy noticed her badge missing. Richard informs everyone that Henry Issac has been murdered in the factory where they were at. Dora Mae, a saleswoman, says she didn't see Kenny because she answered a few calls. A red car is found in a building beside the factory and other clues that point to Kenny's guilt. Conan knocks Richard out to explain Kenny is the killer; he purposely hit Amy and allowed the Junior Detective League to chase him. During the chase, Kenny swapped cars and at one point, he actually killed his boss who was incapacitated, called Dora Mae to distract her, then resumed his chase to ensure his alibi. As proof, they find Amy's missing detective badge wedged in between the bumper of the car in the garage. Defeated, Kenny surrenders to the authorities.
110	116	4	"The Cooking Classroom Murder Case (Part 1)" / "Recipe for Murder (Part 1)"; Transliteration: "Ryōri Kyōshitsu Satsujin Jiken (Zenpen)" (Japanese: 料理教室殺人事件（前編）)	Nana Harada	Kazunari Kochi	July 27, 1998
Rachel takes a French cuisine cooking lesson in Serena's absence and Conan and Richard tag along. There, they meet the other students: Katherine Sinclair, Becca Kinsey, Coral Laraway, and Percy Nicholson, before meeting the teacher, Misty Laraway. There is a blackout while Conan and Richard head to the washroom. An unseen figure creeps up on Misty who falls on the ground. When power is restored, they find someone purposely tripped the circuit breaker using a weight and block of ice. Returning to the kitchen, Misty is on the floor claiming to have trouble breathing and Conan discovers she's been punctured in the back. She is rushed to the hospital while the police investigate and find evidence the attacker was someone from inside. Word gets out that Misty had been stabbed by, what doctors described as, a sewing needle. Personal belongings are searched for a weapon fitting that description, however, nothing turns up. Inspector Meguire receives a phone call from the hospital, and despite all efforts made, Misty passes away, thus turning the investigation into a murder case.
111	117	5	"The Cooking Classroom Murder Case (Part 2)" / "Recipe for Murder (Part 2)"; Transliteration: "Ryōri Kyōshitsu Satsujin Jiken (Kōhen)" (Japanese: 料理教室殺人事件（後編）)	Yasuichiro Yamamoto	Kazunari Kochi	August 3, 1998
The four suspects are interrogated and searched. Everyone has a motive: Misty stole Katherine's boyfriend, Carol's husband, who is Misty's son, is abusive, Misty favors another chef and not Percy, and Becca's recipes was stolen and published by Misty. Conan does a little investigation of his own and finds a contact lens case outside the bathroom window and tinted contact lens in one of the mixing bowls. Conan tranquilizes Richard, revealing Percy Nicholson as the killer. He wore colored contacts before class started then took them out during the blackout which temporarily enhanced his vision. Percy, using a sewing needle, heightened vision, and string, moved over to Misty and murdered her. He used the ring on his finger (the only suspect wearing a ring) as a thimble to push the needle in and the string to pull it out. Conan concludes, stating Percy hid his needle in the tube of his fountain pen. Percy confesses and was enraged how Misty stole Becca's recipes. Conan denounces this; Misty's murder wasn't out of love, she refused to sponsor him and his restaurant failed. After the case, Rachel talks about joining other cooking lessons and Richard claims there is no need, and comically chokes on a fish bone.
112	118	6	"The Seven Mysteries of Teitan Elementary" / "School of Ghouls"; Transliteration: "Teitan-shō Nana-Fushigi Jiken" (Japanese: 帝丹小7不思議事件)	Johei Matsura	N/A	August 10, 1998
Amy came to school one night to find a masked man. She told the vice-principal about it and he became absent for the last two days and the other teachers are acting suspicious. The Junior Detective League sneaks into the school at night where they find puppets with their names on it, mannequins and statues being moved, and someone trying to scare them with red paint and dry ice. The Junior Detective League pretends to be scared and hide in the bathroom. When they come out, they find their teacher, Ms. Kobayashi, secretly practicing for the parent meet. However, she claims to not have tried to scare them off and they realize that someone else is indeed in the school. However, it is actually the vice-principal who lost his toupee and had been searching for it for the last two nights.
113	119	7	"The White Sandy Beach Murder Case" / "Prescription for Murder"; Transliteration: "Shiroi Sunahama Satsujin Jiken" (Japanese: 白い砂浜殺人事件)	Kazuo Nogami	Yutaka Yamada	August 17, 1998
Annie Evans is found by a reef in what appears to be a suicide. Her friend Liz believes otherwise and is convinced that Dr. Kennedy murdered her because she broke up with him due to his behavior. When information that the town's doctor had been intimate with her in the past is revealed, both Conan and Richard suspect that murder is really involved. Now the two must find the clues before his drinking alibi reigns over them. Conan finds a float with a hole in it, studies the ocean tides, and stuns Richard, revealing Dr. Kennedy murdered Annie Evans. He chloroformed her then tied a rock to her ankles then placed her in the float with a hole in it and set her out to sea where she quietly drowned once the float ran out of air. Though he continues denying involvement, Conan reveals that Dr. Kennedy's fingerprints are on the float. Presented with this evidence, Dr. Kennedy surrenders to the authorities.
114	120	8	"The Scuba Diving Murder Case (Part 1)" / "Scuba Dying (Part 1)"; Transliteration: "Sukyūba Daibingu Satsujin Jiken (Zenpen)" (Japanese: スキューバダイビング殺人事件（前編）)	Hirohito Ochi	Junichi Miyashita	August 24, 1998
Rachel tricks her mother and father into going to the beach together. Richard, annoyed, leaves for the bathroom and returns with two girls named Kimberly Sanchez and Haley Martin and meet their companions: Kevin, Hatcher, and Matthew, who is engaged to Kimberly. They invite the Moore family and Conan to lunch with the scuba diving club at the local college. Kimberly decides to go swimming alone and asks Kiwako to get her a towel during lunch, however, the group spots Kimberly drowning. Matthew attempts to rescue Kimberly but he is thrown back by Kevin, who saves her, due to his inability to swim. Kimberly, complaining of pain from her hand, was bitten by a snake and is rushed to the hospital. Rachel is sure she saw an erabu sea snake, but everyone is confused when she claims she saw the snake with wings. Into the investigation, Eva expresses her anger to Rachel, not at Richard who has yet to discover she isn't wearing her wedding ring, but one of Kimberly's friends made an attempt at her life.
115	121	9	"The Scuba Diving Murder Case (Part 2)" / "Scuba Dying (Part 2)"; Transliteration: "Sukyūba Daibingu Satsujin Jiken (Kōhen)" (Japanese: スキューバダイビング殺人事件（後編）)	Nana Harada	Junichi Miyashita	August 31, 1998
The Moore family, Conan, and the diving club members rush to the hospital where Kimberly is in intensive care. Conan and Eva are sure that murder was the plan. Conan gets an idea who did it after a conversation Eva and Rachel has about Richard trying to test her patience. Conan tranquilizes Richard, revealing Haley Martin to be the culprit and explaining how Kimberly was pretending to drown to test Matthew's love for her. Haley, with her own plan in mind, jumped into the water not to save Kimberly, but to force a snake to bite Kimberly, thus taking advantage of the situation. She had a snake hidden in her fanny pack secured with tape to keep it from biting her, explaining the wings Rachel saw. The tape and snake scales attached to it is enough evidence to convict her of attempted first degree murder. Haley confesses, stating she was jealous that Matthew chose Kimberly over her. Kimberly, having survived Haley's attack, apologizes to Haley for not considering her feelings of Matthew and brushes the incident off as karma catching up to her.
116	122	10	"The Mystery Writer Disappearance Case (Part 1)" / "The Mystery Writer Disappearance (Part 1)"; Transliteration: "Misuterii Sakka Shissō Jiken (Zenpen)" (Japanese: ミステリー作家失踪事件（前編）)	Johei Matsura	N/A	September 7, 1998
Katie Nantz shows up at the detective agency asking Detective Moore to find her father, Jonathan, who vanished two months ago along with his wife. The only clue to his whereabouts is a piece found in his latest publication.
117	123	11	"The Mystery Writer Disappearance Case (Part 2)" / "The Mystery Writer Disappearance (Part 2)"; Transliteration: "Misuterii Sakka Shissō Jiken (Kōhen)" (Japanese: ミステリー作家失踪事件（後編）)	Kazuo Nogami	N/A	September 14, 1998
In continuation from the last case, the search for the mystery writer continues. Conan and the others must decipher the code in his text in order to solve the mystery of his and his wife's disappearance two months before.
118	124	12	"The Naniwa Serial Murder Case^{1 hr.}" / "License to Die (Part 1)"; Transliteration: "Naniwa no Renzoku Satsujin Jiken" (Japanese: 浪花の連続殺人事件)	Yasuichiro Yamamoto	N/A	September 21, 1998
A serial killer who strangles his victims first then stabs them through their wallet and into their chest appears in Osaka. Harley Hartwell invites Conan and the Moores for a tour in around his hometown with Truman Salinger as their guide and police escort. While on the tour they meet Kirsten Thomas who has followed them since the beginning. Later, the body of Castron Odalis is dropped onto their car, the third victim of the same offender. Susan Connoly, a terrified bystander, leaves the scene in her car and Harley manages to get her license and track her down to her residence. Conan and Harley find her apartment empty and they are drawn by a scream outside, where they and a maintenance worker find Susan has fallen prey to the same serial killer, strangled and stabbed through her wallet into her chest.
118	125	12	"The Naniwa Serial Murder Case^{1 hr.}" / "License to Die (Part 2)"; Transliteration: "Naniwa no Renzoku Satsujin Jiken" (Japanese: 浪花の連続殺人事件)	Yasuichiro Yamamoto	N/A	September 21, 1998
Conan and Harley find out the victims are indeed connected, they took the driving test at the same place, where an instructor named Mr. Inaba was killed in a drunk driving crash. Harley then travels to meet up with Congressman Grady, their prime suspect; however, Grady himself received a call from the culprit but refuses to tell the authorities. Conan is forced by Rachel to travel with another officer to go to their motel but due to an emergency, they are driven to the site where Cornelius Graver, a dangerous fugitive and also a suspect, is thought to be hiding. After Conan finds him, he realizes Cornelius and Grady are not the murderer. Harley confronts the serial killer: Truman Salinger, his tour guide, who intentionally dropped his victim's body on the car to throw Harley into an active murder case, which in turn, gave him access to Congressman Grady who he planned to murder next. Cornelius, while hiding for his other crimes, was found by Salinger who he mistaken for Mr. Inaba, Salinger's father who was killed by his victims in a prank gone wrong. Cornelius also confesses this to the other authorities when he is captured and was planned to be used as a scapegoat once Salinger completed his killing spree. After stopping his suicide, Harley is shot but survives.
119	126	13	"The Kamen Yaiba Murder Case" / "The Masked Yaiba Murder Mystery"; Transliteration: "Kamen Yaibaa Satsujin Jiken" (Japanese: 仮面ヤイバー殺人事件)	Hirohito Ochi	Kazunari Kochi	October 12, 1998
Conan, Richard, Rachel, and the Junior Detective League are on their way to dinner and meet Stu Hogan dressed as a Masked Yaiba character. George reaches for his gun but Stu reacts in time. Stu is having a party with his friends York Taylor and Melanie Seymour. Suddenly, Sam Mitchner, another friend, angrily bursts through the door and shoots Stu before turning his gun and killing himself, horrifying everyone present. Stu survives the attack due to the bulletproof vest under his costume. A thorough investigation shows more than what anyone could have imagined. Conan stuns Richard and explains that Sam did not kill himself as everyone thought; he was murdered and his death was orchestrated and rehearsed under the rouse of a play carried out with real bullets acted out by Sam and his killer, who is revealed to be Stu Hogan. In conclusion, George's fingerprint was found on Sam's gun but he never touched it. Before the party, George touched Stu's gun, concrete evidence that Stu swapped guns. Stu confesses, stating vengeance for his brother Henry, who was killed in an accident when Sam stole his rare Masked Yaiba poster.
120	127	14	"The Honey Cocktail Murder Case" / "The Big Sting"; Transliteration: "Hanii Kakuteru Satsujin Jiken" (Japanese: ハニーカクテル殺人事件)	Johei Matsura	Masaki Sakurai	October 19, 1998
Richard is invited by Stacy Young, a previous client, to her mountain house who wishes Richard to help with the announcement of a spa resort. While Richard is looking out the window, Stacy falls from the second floor and is pronounced dead on the scene. Evidence shows Stacy was attacked by bees and accidentally ran off the balcony, but Conan believes there's more to the story and does an investigation of his own. Conan tranquilizes Richard and declares the housekeeper, Stanley Aikman, as the killer. Stanley covered Stacy's doorknob, her only means of escape, with bees and honey thus using Stacy's apiphobia to his advantage. He weakened her balcony railing in advance with ether and when Stacy leaned against it, it broke, sending her to her death below. As evidence, Stanley has thread in his pocket that was used to release the bees from a balloon that was hidden in her chimney. Stanley confesses and says he saved Stacy from a bee attack when they were younger, but in return, she berated and humiliated him every chance she got.
121	128	15	"The Sealed Bathroom Murder Case (Part 1)" / "The Forgotten Bond (Part 1)"; Transliteration: "Basurūmu Misshitsu Jiken (Zenpen)" (Japanese: バスルーム密室事件（前編）)	Nana Harada	N/A	October 26, 1998
Two sisters, Mindy and Maya, are packing boxes and drinking glasses of beer, one of which, has sleeping pills dissolved in it. The next day, Conan, Richard, and Rachel are on their way to a Yóko concert when Richard discovers he lost his ticket. He overhears Mindy on the payphone and her situation about a friend who is unable to go to the concert because of a cold. Richard asks her for the spare ticket and she accepts as long as he drives her to her house to pick up her sister Maya. Upon arriving, they find that Maya has taped herself inside the bathroom. Richard, Rachel, and Mindy bust the door down to discover Maya dead from a slit wrist. Only her fingerprints were on the tape and two mixed cleaners were found near the body. Mindy, the prime suspect, is seen hysterically laughing over her sister's death while alone in a room. Everyone is convinced that Maya committed suicide, however, Conan believes that a vicious murder took place, and Mindy Garrett was the cold-blooded killer.
122	129	16	"The Sealed Bathroom Murder Case (Part 2)" / "The Forgotten Bond (Part 2)"; Transliteration: "Basurūmu Misshitsu Jiken (Kōhen)" (Japanese: バスルーム密室事件（後編）)	Yoshio Suzuki	N/A	November 2, 1998
Maya's fiancé, Kenneth, busts in telling the police he rang the door bell the day before for a date. Conan detects blood above the peephole on the door and tranquilizes Richard, explaining that Maya didn't commit suicide but was murdered by her sister Mindy. After rendering Maya unconscious with sleeping pills, Mindy dragged Maya in the bathroom and duct taped the door and window, slit Maya's wrist with a straight razor, and simply walked out. After bringing witnesses, Mindy coaxed them to breaking the door down, then twisted the doorknob to make it appear as if they broken through the seal, when in reality, they did not. As evidence, Mindy unintentionally got Maya's blood on her bandanna that transferred over on the door above the peephole when she looked out at Kenneth. Mindy confesses, stating how the victim stole her boyfriend. After a misunderstanding of feelings, Mindy runs to Maya's corpse begging her to wake up but to no avail. After the case, Richard is running up on stage at Yóko Okino's concert and giving her flowers, however this is revealed to be a dream.
123	130	17	"The Weather Lady Abduction Case" / "The Disappearing Weather Girl"; Transliteration: "Otenki Oneesan Yūkai Jiken" (Japanese: お天気お姉さん誘拐事件)	Minoru Tozawa	Manabu Harada	November 9, 1998
Ashley Underwood, the weather girl for the local news, leaves a message for Richard's assistance. Richard is away because of business so the Junior Detective League goes to discover Ashley has been getting threatening letters. They encounter Katie Banwell, Ashley's coworker, who is cruel to the children. Conan gives Ashley his pager number just before she receives an urgent phone call and asks the Junior Detective League to wait for her. When she does not come back, Conan stumbles onto a few disturbing facts that Ashley has been kidnapped. He begins to receive numbers as messages from her on his pager including the emergency telephone number. With a hint from Rachel and George, Conan is able to decode the messages and pinpoint where Ashley is. The kids rescue Ashley and bump heads with the kidnapper who they subdue and unmask to reveal Katie Banwell. An artistically designed nail is what gave her away. Katie confesses stating the news team replaced her with Ashley, and Conan gives her a reality check saying she should have worked harder and fight to maintain her position. She is arrested shortly afterwards.
124	–	18	"A Mysterious Sniper Murder Case (Part 1)"; Transliteration: "Nazo no Sogekimono Satsujin Jiken (Zenpen)" (Japanese: 謎の狙撃者殺人事件（前編）)	Nana Harada	Hiroshi Kashiwabara	November 16, 1998
Seiji Ishimoto, president of an electronic company, claims he has been receiving threat letters and hires Richard as a bodyguard. While attending a banquet, Tsuneaki, Seiji's secretary, drops his remote control and puts the batteries back in. Masao Tanaka, a government minister, is killed instantly by a gunshot and Seiji's shoulder is grazed. Conan spots a man, Shiro Hiraoka, on the balcony but he loses him in a chase and discovers scratch marks on the spotlight. Richard spends the night at Seiji's hotel room keeping watch in case the murderer returns. In the morning, Richard receives a phonecall from Inspector Meguire announcing Shiro Hiraoka was found dead after an apparent fall from some stairs in an abandoned building. Conan knows Shiro was murdered because he knows someone's secret. This twist of events leaves Conan baffled but promises to solve the case.
125	–	19	"A Mysterious Sniper Murder Case (Part 2)"; Transliteration: "Nazo no Sogekimono Satsujin Jiken (Kōhen)" (Japanese: 謎の狙撃者殺人事件（後編）)	Hirohito Ochi	Hiroshi Kashiwabara	November 23, 1998
Seiji Ishimoto tells the police about the threat letters after he's approached by the minister's secretary, Tsuneaki Niikura. When everyone leaves the hotel room, Conan searches for clues. Inspector Meguire questions Richard about Seiji's secretary and reveals she has a motive and shows a picture of her boyfriend who Richard recognizes as the person he bumped into as he left the hotel room. Richard calls everyone to the murder scene where he declares the boyfriend to be the killer. Conan stuns Richard and recreates the murder. Shiro did not shoot Seiji and Tanaka; the gun used in the crime was strapped to the spotlight with a motor that winds a string that pulls the trigger. Afterwards, Shiro took the gun and fled, met up with his accomplice and was murdered. Conan reveals Tsuneaki Niikura as the true killer after he blurts out something he shouldn't have said; he tried to frame Seiji for the murder after killing Hiraoka by placing the remote control in his office. His motive is nothing more than greed as Tsuneaki is next to succeed Tanaka as head of parliament, but he made no plans of retiring soon. As evidence, Tsuneaki's fingerprints are on the battery inside the remote control. Sending the threat letters to Seiji was just a diversion and he surrender to the authorities.
126	–	20	"The Traveling Drama Troupe Murder Case (Part 1)"; Transliteration: "Tabi Shibai Ichiza Satsujin Jiken (Zenpen)" (Japanese: 旅芝居一座殺人事件（前編）)	Johei Matsura	Junichi Miyashita	November 30, 1998
Rachel, Serena, and the Junior Detective League are given backstage access by Tamanosuke Ito to his drama/acrobatics show that specializes in plays depicting "Edo Boy", a feudal-themed thief responsible for crimes across Japan who has evaded arrest to the present day. After meeting cast members Ryuichi Muraki, Yuri Shirai, Kenzo Tajima, and Tamanosuke's sister Megumi, they witness the script writer, Tetsuo Chikaishi, being unnecessarily rough with Tamanosuke. After going through a dress rehearsal of the play, Megumi goes to get Tetsuo, only to find him dead. No one from the troupe could have committed the murder since they were all practicing together. Conan can't help but notice that Tamanosuke is acting suspicious when he doesn't tell everyone that something is missing from the scene.
127	–	21	"The Traveling Drama Troupe Murder Case (Part 2)"; Transliteration: "Tabi Shibai Ichiza Satsujin Jiken (Kōhen)" (Japanese: 旅芝居一座殺人事件（後編）)	Yoshio Suzuki	Junichi Miyashita	December 7, 1998
Tamanosuke is seen wandering around Tetsuo's murder scene and is found attacked by Conan and Megumi. The troupe's treasurer, Itoe Ogiwara, is found at the bottom of the stage basement, dead with a letter apparently calling her out in her hand. At the hospital, the killer, now believed to be the real Edo Boy, attempts to finish off a recovering Tamanosuke, but fails. Conan finally discover the truth, and tranquilizes Richard, revealing that Tamanosuke knew Edo Boy killed Tetsuo because he was being blackmailed but didn't know who Edo Boy actually was. Ogiwara, believing her money laundering had been discovered, was killed due to a misunderstanding of the letter which was meant to call Edo Boy out and meet with Tamanosuke. Kenzo Tajima is revealed to be Edo Boy and, in turn, the killer. As evidence, his fingerprints are on Tatsuo's keyboard when he deleted the files from the computer. Kenzo apologizes to the cast and staff and is arrested for the murders.
128	–	22	"The Black Organization: One Billion Yen Robbery Case"; Transliteration: "Kuro no Soshiki Jūoku En Gōdatsu Jiken" (Japanese: 黒の組織10億円強奪事件)	Minoru Tozawa	Junichi Miyashita	December 14, 1998
While at the bank, Conan witnesses bank robbers driving away with the 1 billion yen in a truck. The police finds the abandoned truck under the bridge and come upon a mask used for the robbery. The lipstick on the mask suggests that Masami Hirota is the culprit in the robbery. Later that night, Gin and Vodka assassinate the two bank robbers and place Hirota's lipstick at the crime scene. Conan realizes that an unknown assailant is attempting to lure Hirota out of hiding. Conan sneaks into Hirota's apartment and attempts to stop her from meeting the assailants. Ignoring Conan's warning, Hirota heads to an empty warehouse and meets Gin who reveals her true identity to be Akemi Miyano. She asks him to release her sister in exchange for the 1 billion yen; Gin however murders her and takes the keys to a coin locker containing the money from the robbery. Conan arrives at the warehouse shortly after and finds a mortally wounded Akemi who reveals to him the existence of the crime syndicate Black Organization before dying. After the police arrive, Conan promises to himself that he will take down the Organization.
129	–	23	"The Girl from the Black Organization and the University Professor Murder Case^{2 hrs.}" Transliteration: "Kuro no Soshiki Kara Kita Onna Daigaku Kyōju Satsujin Jiken" (Japanese: 黒の組織から来た女 大学教授殺人事件)	Keitaro Motonaga Toshiya Shinohara	N/A	January 4, 1999
Conan's class receives a new student named Ai Haibara. After school, a boy named Toshiya asks the Junior Detective League to find his missing brother. The Junior Detective League along with Ai investigate Toshiya's house and finds a painting of Natsume Sōseki. Toshiya reveals that before his brother disappeared, a woman, who had an interest in that portrait, approached Toshiya. The Junior Detective League search around town to ask whether anyone has seen the woman or Toshiya's brother. Conan notices that a man was using a counterfeit ¥1000 and realizes Toshiya's brother was kidnapped and forced to help create counterfeit bills. After following the man along with the clues Toshiya's brother left behind, they are able to apprehend the organized crime group and save Toshiya's brother. On the way home, Ai reveals that she betrayed the Black Organization and escaped with the use of the APTX 4869 which caused her to become a child. She reveals that she accidentally sent a floppy disk containing data on the Black Organization to her sister which is now in the possession of her sister's professor, Masami Hirota. Agasa takes the two there to retrieve it only to realize that Hirota has been murdered. The suspects are Hirota's three students who visited that day. Conan reveals the culprit to be Akira Shirokura; Shirokura after bludgeoning Hirota to death tied the answering machine cassette tape around the key to the room which rewound when a call was made and subsequently bringing the key into the room. As evidence, Conan reveals that Shirokura's fingerprints should be found on the tape. Ai breaks down and asks Conan why he could not save her sister, Akemi, from the Black Organization. Later that day, Ai attempts to read the files off the disk only to have a virus delete all the data.
130	–	24	"The Indiscriminate Threatening Stadium Case (Part 1)"; Transliteration: "Kyōgijō Musabetsu Kyōhaku Jiken (Zenpen)" (Japanese: 競技場無差別脅迫事件（前編）)	Hirohito Ochi	N/A	January 11, 1999
The Junior Detective League are at attending a soccer stadium match when Conan notices someone shot a ball with a handgun. The police arrive and Conan learns that a culprit called the TV director demanding a ransom or else he will begin shooting at people from inside the crowd. Conan realizes there are two culprits, one with the gun and one observing and calling the director. The police ambush a culprit when he goes after the money but his partner threatens to release his partner or he will begin the massacre.
131	–	25	"The Indiscriminate Threatening Stadium Case (Part 2)"; Transliteration: "Kyōgijō Musabetsu Kyōhaku Jiken (Kōhen)" (Japanese: 競技場無差別脅迫事件（後編）)	Nana Harada	N/A	January 18, 1999
The caller demands 1¥ billion in exchange for calling the police. Conan, knowing that it is impossible to gather that amount of money in a short time, concludes the caller plans to murder someone regardless of the money. As they scan the cameras for suspicious people in the crowd, Conan realizes the culprit is a cameraman and goes to confront him. The culprit reveals his bank robbery for foiled by the TV station resulting in his wife's suicide. He intends to kill someone and put the blame on the station as revenge. Conan apprehends the criminal by kicking a soccer ball at his head. In the end, Vi compliments Conan's work and reveals she is only one year older than him.
132	–	26	"Magic Lover's Murder Case (The Murder)"; Transliteration: "Kijutsu Aikōka Satsujin Jiken (Jikenhen)" (Japanese: 奇術愛好家殺人事件（事件篇）)	Johei Matsura	N/A	January 25, 1999
Sonoko invites Ran, to attend a meeting full of avid magic fans she met online. The magic fans and guests are Kikue Tanaka, Toshiya Hamano, Naoko Kuroda, Yoshinori Ara, Kiyohiro Sugama, and Katsuki Doito. After dropping her off at the snow lounge, Conan and Kogoro return home. During the ride, they hear on the radio that one of the members, Tatsuo Nashiyama, is found brutally murdered in his home. On his computer was a cryptic message signed by the Dark Master, one of the members of the club, possibly hinting at more murders. Conan rushes back to the lounge only to find the only bridge across is on fire. He rushes through to warn everyone of the danger that they are in but the bridge and Conan collapse thereafter. Toshiya, with Kikue as his assistant, plays a game with the others to determine who does chores. Sonoko is blindfolded as she writes down names. When Conan regains some health, he relays the cryptic warning, but it is too late as Toshiya Hamano is found dead ten metres from the lounge in the middle of the snow covered backyard. Evidence shows he had been strangled to death. After analyzing the little facts that they know as well as surveying the conditions of the scene, Conan concludes that they are faced with an impossible crime as there were no footprints leading to or from Toshiya's corpse.
133	–	27	"Magic Lover's Murder Case (The Suspicion)"; Transliteration: "Kijutsu Aikōka Satsujin Jiken (Giwakuhen)" (Japanese: 奇術愛好家殺人事件（疑惑篇）)	Yoshio Suzuki	N/A	February 1, 1999
The members of the lounge decide to leave Hamano's body untouched to preserve the crime scene and retreat back into the lounge. They discuss among themselves and believe that the club member with the Username Dark Master is the murderer. The suspects give their back story where Conan learns that another magician named Fuden Harui was a member of the club but was killed while performing a magic trick on stage. While upstairs getting a sweater, an arrow breaks through the window and nearly misses Kikue. Conan learns about the game Toshiya played. At the same time, another arrow breaks through the window on the bottom floor. The people of the lounge head outside to investigate and find a crossbow on the ground, leading everyone to believe the culprit is an outsider. Conan investigates and notices that there was evidence that something was stapled to the outside of the house. After staring at a wine bottle upside down with the sail of a boat on it, Conan realizes how the murders are done.
134	–	28	"Magic Lover's Murder Case (The Resolution)"; Transliteration: "Kijutsu Aikōka Satsujin Jiken (Kaiketsuhen)" (Japanese: 奇術愛好家殺人事件（解決篇）)	Nana Harada	N/A	February 8, 1999
Conan recreates the crossbow attack on the top floor and lures everyone outside, where he knocks Sonoko out and reveals the killer to be Kikue Tanaka. Before the events began, Kikue went to Tatsuo's house and bludgeoned him to death. As for Hamano's murder, Kikue strangled him, and using fishing line, fired them from the balcony to the trees in the form of a boat's sail until there was enough to support Hamano's weight. She then tied a string around Hamano's body and used the positioned string to slide the body downwards. She then tied all the strings into another arrow and fired it off. Afterwards, Kikue fired a concealed crossbow at herself, making herself look like a victim. Kikue manipulated Toshiya's game by giving the blindfolded Sonoko a pen that had no ink. The names and chores were already written and predetermined, ensuring Toshiya would be alone doing his chores when Kikue murdered him. As evidence, Conan reveals that the arrows were specialized to have string connected to them, specifically to lower Toshiya's corpse in the snow, and that they should be found on Kikue's body somewhere. Kikue confesses to the murders and reveals that she is Fuden Harui's granddaughter. Although Fuden took the risk and died as a result of an accident while performing a dangerous stunt, Tatsuo and Toshiya made cruel and harsh remarks about him after the fact, which Kikue found unforgivable. Conan meanwhile confronts Katsuki Doi and reveals that his name is the anagram for Kaito Kid. Kid reveals that he saw that someone was on the magician's account and wanted to investigate it and escapes the lounge with the use of his hang glider. The next morning, the authorities arrive via helicopter and Kikue surrenders without resistance.

== Notes ==
- ^Jp. The episode's numbering as used in Japan
- ^Eng. The episode's numbering as used by Funimation Entertainment
- ^2 hrs. The episodes were aired as a single two-hour long episode in Japan
