= Okuno Dam =

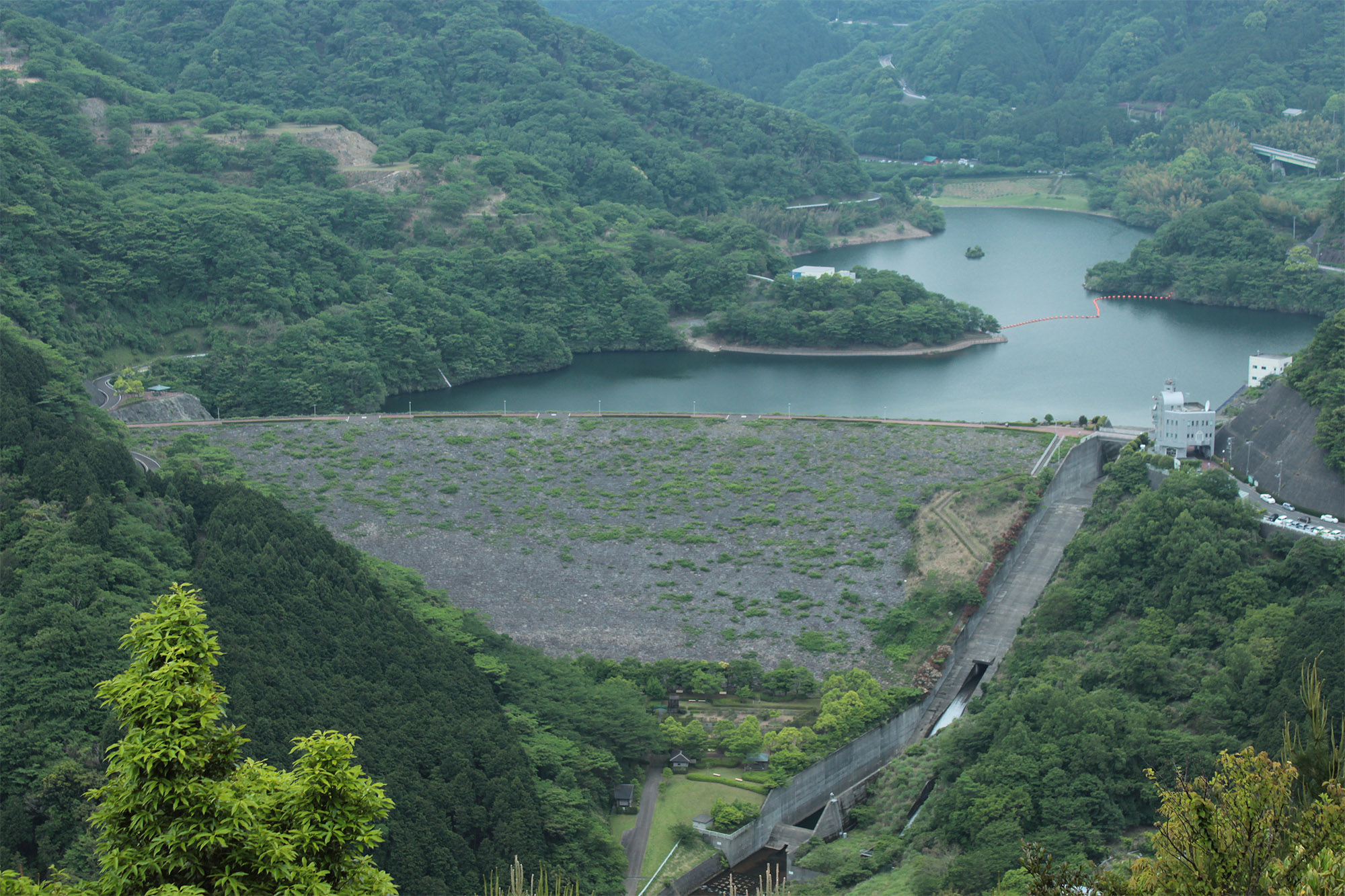
- Interactive map of Okuno Dam
- Official name: 奥野ダム
- Location: Shizuoka Prefecture, Japan
- Coordinates: 34°56′09″N 139°04′11″E
- Construction began: 1972
- Opening date: 1989
- Operator: Shizuoka Prefecture

Dam and spillways
- Impounds: Itō-Ōkawa River
- Height: 63 meters
- Length: 323 meters

Reservoir
- Creates: Lake Matsukawa
- Total capacity: 4,600,000 m3
- Catchment area: 11.7 km2
- Surface area: 31 hectares

Okuno Dam (奥野ダム, Okuno damu) is a multi-purpose dam on the Itō-Ōkawa River, located in Itō, Shizuoka, Japan.

== History ==
The Itō-Ōkawa River is a primary source of drinking water for the city of Itō, on the eastern coast of the Izu Peninsula. However, the area is a region of heavy rains, and is prone to typhoons. The 1958 Kanogawa Typhoon caused widespread flooding and damage to property in the Itō area. From the 1960s, the area around Itō began to develop as a bedroom community for Atami, as well as a popular vacation destination due to its beaches, hot spring resorts and ease of access to Tokyo. In 1972, a project office was established and construction begun by a consortium consisting of Kajima Construction and Kumagai Gumi. Due to the geography of the site, a rock-fill dam design with a central spillway and a height of 63 meters was selected. The estimated completion time was 1983. However, due to difficulties arising from transporting the necessary stones from distant locations, work was not completed until 1989. Although styled as a 'multi-purpose dam', the dam has no associated hydroelectric power facilities, and its primary function is flood control and the supply of drinking water.

The reservoir impounded was named Lake Matsukawa (松川湖, Matsukawa-ko) in 1987, and is a popular recreational area for sports fishermen and bird-watching.
