= Case Closed season 9 =

Season of television series

Case Closed
- Season 9
- The cover of the first DVD compilation for season nine of Detective Conan released by Shogakukan
- No. of episodes: 35

Release
- Original network: NNS (ytv)
- Original release: January 15 – October 22, 2001

Season chronology
- ← Previous; Season 8 Next → Season 10

The ninth season of the Case Closed anime was directed by Yasuichiro Yamamoto and produced by TMS Entertainment and Yomiuri Telecasting Corporation. The series is based on Gosho Aoyama's Case Closed manga series. In Japan, the series is titled Detective Conan (名探偵コナン, Meitantei Conan) but was changed due to legal issues with the title Detective Conan. The episodes' plot follows Conan Edogawa's daily adventures.

The episodes use five pieces of theme music: two opening themes and three closing themes. The first opening theme is "Koi wa Thrill, Shock, Suspense" (恋はスリル,ショック,サスペンス, Koi wa Suriru, Shokku, Sasupensu; lit. 'Love is Thrill, Shock, and Suspense') by Rina Aiuchi until episode 230. The second opening theme is "Destiny" by Miki Matsuhashi for the rest of the season. The first ending theme is "Start in My Life" by Mai Kuraki until episode 232. The second ending theme is "Always" also by Mai Kuraki until episode 247. The third ending theme is "Aoi Aoi Kono Hoshi ni" (青い青いこの地球に, lit. "The Blue Blue Star") by Azumi Uehara and is used for the rest of the season.

The season initially ran from January 15, 2001, through October 22, 2001, on Nippon Television Network System in Japan. Episodes 220 to 254 were later collected into nine DVD compilations by Shogakukan. They were released between December 25, 2002, and August 25, 2003, in Japan.

Episodes 230 and 231 were dubbed by Studio Nano as part of a curated episode list, which was released on Crunchyroll and Netflix on July 3, 2025. Episodes 226 and 227 were later dubbed and released on May 1, 2026.

== Episode list ==
No. overall	No. in season	Title	Directed by	Written by	Original release date
220	1	"The Client Full of Lies (Part 1)"; Transliteration: "Itsuwari Darake no Irainin (Zenpen)" (Japanese: 偽りだらけの依頼人（前編）)	Hiroshi Kurimoto	N/A	January 15, 2001
A woman named Shizuka Ikenami asks Kogoro to help find a man named Shirou Shabata so she can retrieve an old photograph; Conan realizes that Ikenami is lying to Kogoro during their meeting. Realizing that Shirou was skilled in kendo, Conan assumes that his name would show up in past kendo competitions. After finding an address, they enter Shirou's apartment and discover that Shirou has been murdered. Shirou's right hand contains the photograph that Ikenami is searching for making her the prime suspect for the murder.
221	2	"The Client Full of Lies (Part 2)"; Transliteration: "Itsuwari Darake no Irainin (Kōhen)" (Japanese: 偽りだらけの依頼人（後編）)	Mashu Ito	N/A	January 22, 2001
After a thorough investigation, Conan tranquilizes Kogoro and reveals the culprit to be Shirou's wife, Kyouko Shabata. Conan reveals that the photograph was used to hide Shirou's real dying message, his wedding ring covered in blood in his right hand. Conan reveals that Kyouko falsified Shirou's time of death by placing the morning newspaper by Shirou's late-night meal in order to make it seem as if he was eating breakfast and by using a timed videocassette recorder to record a show. Kyouko is still also revealed to be still holding on to the incriminating evidence--her husband's bloodied wedding ring. Kyouko confesses and reveals that Shirou was gambling them into debt and she was forced to kill him. She attempts to kill herself, but Ikenami stops her. Heiji and Kazuha arrive and reveal that Ikenami is actually Heiji's mother. Ikenami confesses and tells Kogoro that she wanted to see what kind of person he was since Heiji was injured the last time he stayed over.
222	3	"And There Were No Mermaids (The Case)"; Transliteration: "Soshite Ningyou wa Inakunatta (Jikenhen)" (Japanese: そして人魚はいなくなった（事件編）)	Eiichi Kuboyama	N/A	January 29, 2001
Conan, along with Heiji, Ran, and Kazuha travel the Isle of Mermaids looking for Saori Kadowaki, who had sent a letter to Heiji asking him to save her from being killed by a mermaid. They try to look for her but find out that she had been reported missing. The group decides to talk with Saori's childhood friends: Toshimi, Naoko, and Kimie, the island elder Mikoto's great-granddaughter. They also meet Rokuro Fukuyama, the fisherman who is Toshimi's fiancé. Every year on Isle of Mermaids, a festival is held where 3 people win the Dugong Arrow that is said to give immortality to its carrier. Kimie gives Ran and Kazuha each a ticket for the lottery to win a Dugong Arrow since a couple had cancelled and promised to take them to Saori's house after the festival. During the festival, Kazuha wins an arrow, which she receives along with Naoko and Saori's father Benzo. The festival is brought to a disastrous end when Toshimi is found dead, hanging from the waterfall. An investigation follows but neither Conan nor Heiji can say if it's a murder, suicide, or accident until an autopsy is performed. Naoko suggests that Toshimi could be looking for the Mermaid's grave, then explains how an actual mermaid was found in a burning warehouse. At Toshimi's funeral, Naoko herself is strangled to death, her corpse hung out on the beach net, and her Dugong Arrow stolen.
223	4	"And There Were No Mermaids (The Deduction)"; Transliteration: "Soshite Ningyou wa Inakunatta (Suirihen)" (Japanese: そして人魚はいなくなった（推理編）)	Kazuo Nogami	N/A	February 5, 2001
Conan and Heiji investigate Naoko's brutal murder and discover a trail of fish scales that suggest Naoko's killer came from the sea. The area and history of the Mermaid's Grave which was supposedly a grave of a mermaid that was moved to a forest on mermaid island after grave robbers tried to steal its bones for immortality. They learn that Mikoto is over 130 years old, an arrow carrier, and the head of the festival. While investigating the murders, Kimie is burned alive in the warehouse near the shrine. Conan, after a few more hints and clues, reveals to Heiji over the phone that he knows who the murderer is and to meet him later. However, as Heiji discovers the mermaid's grave in the forest, he falls off the cliff and Kazuha, while successfully pulling him back up, ends up falling off the cliff herself. Heiji jumps off the cliff after her and they both end up hanging from a tree branch. Kazuha sees the branch slowly breaking from the weight of both of them and stabs Heiji's hand with her arrow in order to make him let go and save himself.
224	5	"And There Were No Mermaids (The Resolution)"; Transliteration: "Soshite Ningyou wa Inakunatta (Kaiketsuhen)" (Japanese: そして人魚はいなくなった（解決編）)	Minoru Tozawa	N/A	February 12, 2001
With Kogoro tranquilized, Conan clears the suspects who were accused of murder, then explains that each victim was called out by the person they trusted and was lured with the promise of a personal gain before being murdered, and reveals the serial killer as elder Mikoto, who is then unmasked as Kimie. She had faked her death in the warehouse fire using Saori's corpse who was killed years earlier, the fact that Kimie and Saori had the same dental work done also made that feat easier. Conan reveals that the elder was actually descendants of the family who dressed up as Mikoto to continue the story of the arrow. Heiji and Kazuha arrive at the house in time to confirm the story. Kimie reveals that her mother, who the whole town knew she was the elder and that they knew that the identity of the mermaid's corpse, was the previous elder. Three years ago, Saori, Naoko, and Toshimi locked Kimie's mother in the warehouse and set it ablaze to see if she was really immortal; Saori displayed psychotic tendencies for immortality after seeing, who she believed, was the same person, and indirectly revealed her and her friends' involvement in Kimie's mother's death. Kimie herself continued to pretend to be the elder for her mother. All of the island's people bow their heads and apologize for not telling her sooner as she cries due to her guilt. It is revealed that even though Kazuha stabbed Heiji's hand on the cliff he refused to let go of her hand and Kimie is arrested.
225	6	"The Secret of the High Sales"; Transliteration: "Shoubai Hanjou no Himitsu" (Japanese: 商売繁盛のヒミツ)	Hiroshi Kurimoto	Nobuo Ogizawa	February 19, 2001
A boy named Rintaro asks the Detective Boys to investigate on a strange man named Yuuji Kamekura. Rintaro explains that Yuuji appeared one day at his family restaurant claiming he owes Rintaro's grandfather a favor and would like to work at the restaurant. Yuuji soon after begins living with the family and helps them improve the restaurant to the point the family are constantly busy with the customers. The Detective Boys investigate and all but Conan are convinced Yuuji is planning to dig a tunnel into a store to steal merchandise. The Detective Boys learn from a manager of a jewelry store that a robbery occurred five years ago and the thief was never caught. The Detective Boys deduce that Yuuji plans to dig up the jewels he buried five years ago from the robbery under the restaurant which was under construction five years ago. Conan denies the absurd deduction but gives in when Haibara tells him Yuuji is a very simple person unlike previous criminals that he has been up against. The Detective Boys manage to catch Yuuji digging up for jewels and he admits to his crime. Haibara shows up saying she called the police and the Detective Boys ends up receiving letters of appreciation from the police for their help in solving the jewelry robbery case. Conan remains unsatisfied saying that his brain should be used to solve more complicated than this case.
226	7	"Battle Game Trap (Part 1)"; Transliteration: "Batoru Geemu no Wana (Zenpen)" (Japanese: バトルゲームの罠（前編）)	Masato Sato	N/A	February 26, 2001
Sonoko, Ran, and Conan are at the arcade where they meet their high school English teacher, Jodie Starling who is an avid gamer. Jodie introduces Ran to a virtual reality fighting game which uses mechanics to simulate the pain of a real fight. Ran loses to a gamer named Kengo Bitou who taunts her in her lost. Bitou plays the game again his rival, Takayasu Shimizu; The battle is projected on a large screen. Bitou's avatar overwhelms Shimizu's but stops at the climax of the match. The people in the arcade realize Bitou is dead and the police are called in. The police investigate and after reviewing the security camera's footage, they limit the suspects down to four people, Toshitsugu Emori who is a middle aged taxi driver, Hitoshi Dejima and who is arcade employee, Shimizu, and Jodie.
227	8	"Battle Game Trap (Part 2)"; Transliteration: "Batoru Geemu no Wana (Kōhen)" (Japanese: バトルゲームの罠（後編）)	Eiichi Kuboyama	N/A	March 5, 2001
The autopsy reveals the poison to be Tetrodotoxin; a poison that causes instant paralysis and death soon after. Conan investigates and learns the method and the culprit who murdered Bitou. He tranquilizes Sonoko and impersonates her; declaring Shimizu to be the murderer. Conan reveals that Shimizu was the one playing Bitou's game avatar in order to disguise the fact Bitou was already dead. As for the weapon, Conan explains Shimizu hid a needle inside a cigarette, put gum around it, wrapped it around paper and dropped it on the floor so that it would stick to the employee's shoes which would get rid of the evidence. Conan reveals that a coin with Shimizu's fingerprint should be found in Bitou's arcade machine. Shimizu confesses revealing Bitou's gambling and debt caused his sister to develop Vitamin A deficiency due to her working too much to pay off Bitou's debt and not eating enough which resulted in her blindness. As Sonoko, Ran, and Jodie leave the arcade, their discussion leads to Shinichi whom Jodie dubs as Cool Guy. She says goodbye whilst calling Conan Cool Guy and leaves. That night, Jodie calls an unknown person discussing how her target, the Rotten Apple has changed appearance.
228	9	"The Murderous Pottery Class (Part 1)"; Transliteration: "Satsui no Dougei Kyoushitsu (Zenpen)" (Japanese: 殺意の陶芸教室（前編）)	Mashu Ito	N/A	March 12, 2001
Ran, Sonoko, and Conan attend Muneyuki Mino's pottery class to make pretty mugs. Muneyuki is pleased to see Ran as her father Kogoro solved a murder case at The Forgemaster's estate. Later on, Muneyuki displays a dark personality when he strangles Motoo, his son-in-law, to death. When Motoo, obviously, goes missing, Muneyuki sends his other student, Kikuyo, to find him. Kikuyo finds, what appears to be, Motoo's apron under the right side of the closet but when she opens it, he is not there. Muneyuki opens both doors and Motoo's corpse falls out of the closet. During the investigation by the police, Conan observes the movements of Muneyuki and Kikuyo. Conan knows Muneyuki is the killer based on circumstantial evidence, even going as far as to confront him when they are both alone, leaving Muneyuki rather terrified.
229	10	"The Murderous Pottery Class (Part 2)"; Transliteration: "Satsui no Dougei Kyoushitsu (Kōhen)" (Japanese: 殺意の陶芸教室（後編）)	Kazuo Nogami	N/A	March 19, 2001
Conan finds something suspicious about the pendant on the necktie and figures out Muneyuki and his methods. It appears that Kikuyo had a 10 million yen debt and insurance money from Motoo's death would cover it, thus giving her a motive. As police officers and Muneyuki start accusing Kikuyo, Conan puts Sonoko to sleep, revealing Muneyuki as the real killer. After killing Motoo, Muneyuki hung his corpse in the closet, hidden behind the clothes, and rigged the necktie and pendant on the left side holding it in place. He sent Kikuyo to look for Motoo who opened the right closet door, activating his trick and effectively framing her for the murder, but when Muneyuki opens both doors, Motoo's corpse fell out. As evidence, Muneyuki's fingerprints and nail imprints are on the necktie used to kill Motoo and perform the trick. Muneyuki sadly confesses that Motoo was having an affair with Kikuyo while married to his deceased daughter, hence why he continuously tried to frame her. He explains that while his daughter was still alive, she had bought a beige tie for Motoo as a Christmas present and that after her death he had found it thrown in the trash. Originally, he thought that the tie had accidentally fallen into the trash but when he went to the airport, he found Motoo, who he thought would be grieving, smiling happily with Kikuyo clutching onto his arm, enraging him. Muneyuki is arrested for murder.
230	11	"Mysterious Passenger (Part 1)"; Transliteration: "Nazo-meita Joukyaku (Zenpen)" (Japanese: 謎めいた乗客（前編）)	Minoru Tozawa	N/A	April 16, 2001
Gin and Vodka are at a bar discussing their plans with the Black Organization member, Vermouth to capture Sherry. Conan and the Detective Boys are taking the transit bus to a ski resort where they meet Araide and Jodie aboard the bus. Haibara is able to sense that Vermouth is on the bus and hides herself in fear in order to prevent herself from being found. Soon after, the bus is hijacked by two armed men who uses the passengers as hostages and demands the city to release their boss. Conan attempts to search for a way to apprehend the men but is caught every time causing him to realize that one of the three passengers in the back seat is an accomplice of the armed men and is somehow informing them of the passenger's behavior. Conan investigates the ski bags the robbers placed in the center of the bus and realizes they contain explosives.
231	12	"Mysterious Passenger (Part 2)"; Transliteration: "Nazo-meita Joukyaku (Kōhen)" (Japanese: 謎めいた乗客（後編）)	Masato Sato	N/A	April 23, 2001
Conan figures out who the accomplice is. When the bus enters a tunnel, the armed men force Araide and a passenger named Akai Shuichi to wear the ski gear the hijackers were wearing. The hijackers then use Miharu Tomino, a woman chewing gum as a hostage and proceed to leave the bus. Conan reveals that the woman is an accomplice of theirs and that they plan to detonate the bombs in the ski bags once they are off the bus. The Detective Boys are able to inform the driver to stop suddenly which allows Conan to apprehend the criminals. Tomino accidentally activates the bombs when the bus suddenly stopped, giving them a few minutes before it detonates. The passengers leave the bus but Haibara remains seated in the bus as she plans to die in the explosion and subsequently prevent the Black Organization from finding her and harming those around her. Conan rushes back in the bus and throws a fire extinguisher to break the back window, grabs Haibara, and escapes through the back window of the bus before the explosion occurs. Conan has Takagi take Haibara to the hospital in order to hide her from the Black Organization member. Later, Akai Shuichi is seen reporting to an unknown person and informing them that the target has not appeared.
232	13	"The Falling from the Apartment Case"; Transliteration: "Manshon Tenraku Jiken" (Japanese: マンション転落事件)	Kazuo Nogami	Satoshi Kitagawa	May 7, 2001
Mouri Kogoro accepts a case to help to find out who has been sending threatening phone calls and letters to a man named Mitsuo Yoshimura. On the way to Yoshimura's apartment with his friend Joji Ueda, Kogoro and Conan witness Yoshimura fall to his death. The police arrive and start to search for clues and the Ueda asks to go change his clothes. Conan pretends to be thirsty in order to infiltrate the Ueda's room which is 1 floor above the victim's room in order to search for clues. He finds multiple indentations in the carpet indicating that furniture had been placed there but was moved. Later Conan uses Kogoro to say his deduction. Conan reveals that there is no way that the victim's slipper could have flown so far if he had jumped from the 5th floor and since the roof door is locked that means that the victim had jumped from the friend's room which was the highest floor. He deduces that the friend and the victim had drunken whiskey together in the victim's room and the friend had spiked the whiskey with sleeping pills. The friend had carried the victim to his room which he had rearranged to look like the victim's room so that the victim would believe that it was his room. While the friend was with Kogoro and Conan in the restaurant he called the victim saying that the people who were after him were coming for him. Ueda had also previously called a florist to deliver flowers at 7:00 pm which the victim mistook for the people coming after him and he proceeded to jump from the balcony to the warehouse stairs which killed him as he was on the 6th floor. The evidence that Ueda was guilty was that there was no call received by Ueda at the time of the crime. The culprit revealed that he was in debt and the victim convinced him to steal drugs from the hospital they worked at. But when the friend wanted to stop stealing the victim threatened to reveal to everyone in the hospital that the friend had been stealing drugs.
233	14	"The Evidence That Didn't Disappear (Part 1)"; Transliteration: "Kienakatta Shouko (Zenpen)" (Japanese: 消えなかった証拠（前編）)	Hiroshi Kurimoto	N/A	May 14, 2001
Agasa takes the Detective Boys to a neighbor named Teruya Kanou who is giving away his belongings before moving to England. Haibara continues to be pessimistic as she worries that the Black Organization has discovered her from the previous bus hijacking incident. While there Kanou's Papillon goes missing when the longcase clock strikes twelve and chimes twelve times. When Doyle's, the Papillon, collar is found inside an incinerator that has not been used for a long time and the back gate being left open, Conan realizes that a culprit attempted to falsify the scene to give the impression that the culprit kidnapped Doyle and ran away when in fact the culprit is hiding Doyle in the House to steal him afterward. Shino Hasuki's shoes are found near the crime scene and she is suspected of being the culprit by one of the dog breeders.
234	15	"The Evidence That Didn't Disappear (Part 2)"; Transliteration: "Kienakatta Shouko (Kōhen)" (Japanese: 消えなかった証拠（後編）)	Mashu Ito	N/A	May 21, 2001
Conan notices that there is glass wool, which muffles sound, in the incinerator and realizes who the culprit is. After gathering the guests, Conan reveals that the grandfather clock did not chime since the culprit changed the time to 12 hours ahead and reveals that the culprit used the stereo to simulate the chimes. Doyle chased after the chime and the smell of where it's blue cushion was and is lured to the back of the stereo with cheese containing sleeping pills. Conan reveals that the culprit was after the diamond on Doyle's collar which is worth a fortune. He reveals that the culprit is Yoshio Tsunashima; Tsunashima had reserved a small pendulum clock which was becoming slower by a minute per hour, meaning something was weighting down the pendulum which was revealed to be Doyle's collar. Tsunashima starts to run away, however, Arthur and Christie stop him and since he could not bring himself to but a dog he stopped trying to run. Tsunashima confesses to his crime and reveals he needed the money to continue to support the abandoned dogs he kept taking in. Kanou decides to give the collar to Tsunashima and not push for any charges. That following evening, they find out Kanou's other dog, Arthur, was the one who was placed Hasuki's shoes elsewhere. Conan reveals that Arthur wanted to prevent Hasuki from leaving so he could be with his love Christie, Hasuki's German Shepherd. Hasuki announces that she had come to accept Kanou's proposal and will be joining him in England.
235	16	"The Locked Wine Cellar"; Transliteration: "Misshitsu no Wain Seraa" (Japanese: 密室のワインセラー)	Eiichi Kuboyama	Kenji Saito	May 28, 2001
Kogoro, Ran, and Conan are invited to a private party by a President of a financial business, who is known for his expensive collection and various tastes in wine. Three other guests attend and all of which have borrowed money from the president. He challenges one of the guests, a training sommelier to a tasting challenge that if he guesses all of the wines correctly he will forget his debt. As the sommelier guesses many of the wines correctly the president gets frustrated and goes to his wine cellar for a rare wine. They all realize that the president has taken too long and discover his dead body in the wine cellar which has been found locked. Fingerprints have been found on the door knob by two of the suspects yet Conan discovers the clues and in the end uses Kogoro with the aid of Takagi and Chiba to reanact how the criminal killed the President. The culprit had called out the President to the backyard by knocking on the wine cellar window and had then killed him in the backyard. The criminal then used clothesline poles to lower the body into the wine cellar where the corpse's feet knocked down the wine bottles on the top shelf and had used his handkerchief to wipe the wine that got on the clothesline poles. The criminal confesses that they killed the president because he rose the interest on their debt and they couldn't pay because he had to pay his employees.
236	17	"The Nanki Shirahama Mystery Tour (Part 1)"; Transliteration: "Nanki Shirahama Misuterii Tsuaa (Zenpen)" (Japanese: 南紀白浜ミステリーツアー（前編）)	Minoru Tozawa	Kazunari Kochi	June 4, 2001
Ran, Kogoro, and Conan go to Shirahama on a vacation they won from a shopping district lottery, and there meet a group of college students named Maki Shinjou, Tatsuhiko Yura, Madoka Mitsui, Kanako Miyahara, and Kouta Fuji. They are all in the same art club, but don't seem to get along well. During the time that Conan, Ran, and Kogoro at near the souvenir shop Conan feels a mysterious person watching them and that mysterious person gets away on a bus heading to Shirahama where Madoka is drawing before Conan could catch up. When Madoka is drawing, she finds the body of one of her fellow students, Maki, stabbed in the heart. She immediately calls Fuji who is at Adventure World with Kogoro, Ran, and Conan. Madoka tells the police that someone called Maki's phone as it started playing a Beethoven ringtone which made her check the bushes where she discovered Maki stabbed by a knife.
237	18	"The Nanki Shirahama Mystery Tour (Part 2)"; Transliteration: "Nanki Shirahama Misuterii Tsuaa (Kōhen)" (Japanese: 南紀白浜ミステリーツアー（後編）)	Hiroshi Kurimoto	Kazunari Kochi	June 11, 2001
Conan investigates and finds out that Madoka was cheating on her boyfriend with another student, Fuji, but that none of them committed the murder. Conan also reveals through Kogoro that Maki had originally been planning to kill Madoka for stealing her boyfriend. Maki created her own alibi by asking Kanoko to pretend to be her and have Kogoro, Ran, and Conan see her at the station. It is also revealed that the mysterious person that was watching Conan was Kanoko. Kanoko then returned and killed Maki because Maki had helped her get into the university illegally by asking her father to let her into the university.
238	19	"The 3 "K"s of Osaka Case (Part 1)"; Transliteration: "Oosaka "Mittsu no K" Jiken (Zenpen)" (Japanese: 大阪"3つのK"事件（前編）)	Kazuo Nogami	N/A	June 18, 2001
Heiji invites Kogoro, Ran, and Conan to a celebration of the opening of the 3K restaurant by three American celebrities, a heavyweight boxing champion named Ricardo Barreira, a Major League Baseball player named Mike Norwood, and the pro soccer player known named Ray Curtis who Conan admires. Kazuha is shown to be listening in on their phone call and suspects that Heiji is having an affair with some woman as he keeps whispering on the phone "Is now not a good time? I can call back later." and "Have you been caught yet?" During the party th announcer asks if anyone has any questions for the 3 athletes. Suddenly, the news reporter named Ed McCay who was invited asks that isn't Japan the home of many scandals, and mentions that K stands for "kitanai" meaning filth. During the party Ran asks the soccer player for his autograph for Shinichi in front of all the guests which in turn leads Heiji to tell Conan to try and call Ran once in a while as Shinichi. Ran also received an autographed shirt and a ticket to an exhibition match in Nagai that Ray will be playing in which she gives to Conan. In return the soccer player asks Ran to help the 3 of them create a 'K' above the restaurant using the lights of the rooms above the restaurant. While they are doing this a gunshot is heard and a window breaks on the second floor. Heiji and Conan run up to the room and find the dead body of Ed McCay. The reporter is shown to be holding on to his belt with his left hand and showing 3 fingers with his right hand. At the end Heiji is wondering why Shinichi is acting strangely since he is trying to defend the suspects instead of trying to find out the truth.
239	20	"The 3 "K"s of Osaka Case (Part 2)"; Transliteration: "Oosaka "Mittsu no K" Jiken (Kōhen)" (Japanese: 大阪"3つのK"事件（後編）)	Yasuichiro Yamamoto	N/A	June 25, 2001
As Heiji is investigating the rooms, Conan suddenly appears and talks to him about that all three sport celebrities are all innocent. Heiji and Conan find a mop in the closet of a hotel room and figure out what the trick was and Conan refuses to believe that it was possible. Conan runs out and finds the three athletes coming out of the bathroom. Conan goes into the bathroom and finds a needle in the trash. He then heard Ran, Kazuha, and Kogoro coming and Kogoro is talking to Ran and Kazuha about what he had overheard it in the restaurant about the meaning of "bandou". Kogoro also said that Ed McCay was fluent in Japanese and knew a lot about Japanese food. Conan finally figured it out who the culprit is. Conan finally confronts the culprit, Ray. Conan reveals that Ray used a soccer ball in order to turn on the lights on the 1st floor while killing the victim at the same time. Ray reveals that the victim created false rumors about him using drugs and destroyed his life. His wife committed suicide and that he only turned to drugs afterward to ease husband joint pain. Conan convinces Ray to turn himself in which involved the 2 having a conversation completely in English (in the subbed version). Conan is later shown to be sitting on the porch of Heiji's house depressed as one of his favorite soccer players Ray had been arrested. Ran remarks that Conan's expression is very similar to Shinichi's expression when he loses something he loves. Heiji cheers Conan up by trying to keep a soccer ball in the air by kicking. He fails which leads to Conan showing him the correct way to do it. Ran and Kazuha mention how they look like brothers.
240	21	"The Bullet Train Transport Case (Part 1)"; Transliteration: "Shinkansen Gosou Jiken (Zenpen)" (Japanese: 新幹線護送事件（前編）)	Masato Sato Kazuhiko Ishii	N/A	July 2, 2001
While traveling home on the Shinkansen from Osaka, Conan, Ran and Kogoro ran into Officer Satou and Takagi, who were transporting a criminal. Later, a bomb was found on the train that Officer Satou went to investigate. At that time, while she was in the bathroom with it, Officer Takagi had to take the criminal to the bathroom. And then, he apparently committed suicide but...
241	22	"The Bullet Train Transport Case (Part 2)"; Transliteration: "Shinkansen Gosou Jiken (Kōhen)" (Japanese: 新幹線護送事件（後編）)	Masato Sato Kazuhiko Ishii	N/A	July 9, 2001
From the crime scene, Conan found a suspicious thing that makes the scene as the place of homicide. During the investigation, Conan observes three suspects. Conan points out the suspects of who the murderer is. After investigating and finding clues, Conan reveals the culprit. He tries to escape but is stopped by Takagi and Satou.
242	23	"Boy Genta's Misfortune"; Transliteration: "Genta Shōnen no Sainan" (Japanese: 元太少年の災難)	Minoru Tozawa	N/A	July 16, 2001
Genta has been acting weird at school lately. The Detective Boys learns that he is being targeted by a killer. Genta tries to remember where he sees the killer. After eating ice cream, seeing the Flag of France, and looking at a store mirror, he heads to a barber shop. Afterwards the killer confronts him but Conan reveals it was a trap and that the killer is surrounded by cops.
243	24	"Kogoro Mouri's Imposter (Part 1)"; Transliteration: "Mōri Kogoro no Nisemono (Zenpen)" (Japanese: 毛利小五郎のニセ者（前編）)	Hiroshi Kurimoto	N/A	July 23, 2001
Tatsuo Mori, a Mori Kogoro impersonator, arrives at the Aoiya Hotel near a creepy forest where he is invited to investigate a case where a long-haired man is said to have committed suicide 4-5 years ago. The real Kogoro, with Ran and Conan, is heading there as well and runs into Detective Yamamura who explains the case; the man who committed suicide was wearing a winter coat but died in the summer, had keys, but no driver's license, and cigarettes but no lighter. Kogoro says he was hired by Yoshiro Onda, the hotel's owner to search into the matter. After a brief investigation, they head to the inn where Kogoro bumps heads with his imposter and meets Eiji Urakawa and Masao Jinbo, who gives Ran her cell phone. He decides to play along and not reveal his identity. Later that night, Tatsuo is found hanging in his room.
244	25	"Kogoro Mouri's Imposter (Part 2)"; Transliteration: "Mōri Kogoro no Nisemono (Kōhen)" (Japanese: 毛利小五郎のニセ者（後編）)	Mashu Ito	N/A	July 30, 2001
After analyzing the clues and facts, Conan is convinced that the long-haired man and Tatsuo were murdered. He successfully finds the treasure and invites the culprit to the forest where Detective Yamamura arrives, revealing the killer to be Masao Jinbo. With Kogoro tranquilized, Conan reveals that Jinbo and the long-haired man were part of an embezzlement scam acquired them 50 billion yen. Due to the unnerved feeling of leaving the money in the forest, the man felt that Jinbo would try to kill him and take the money for himself; he left a post-death threatening message should an incident like that occurred. Jinbo indeed murdered his partner then placed evidence, found from another suicide case, to falsify his time of death. Jinbo hired Tatsuo after learning that the real Kogoro was getting involved, but murdered him as well as Tatsuo felt played and threatened to reveal the truth to the real authorities once he learned there was only a sumo magazine in the briefcase. As evidence, Jinbo's footprint matches the one found on the shogi board when he used it to hang Tatsuo and he knew Kogoro was the real deal when he handed Ran her phone which had her name on it. Jinbo surrenders and afterwards, Kogoro picks up girls who are his fans and gives them a ride in the car.
245	26	"The Gunshot at the Sunflower Estate"; Transliteration: "Himawari-kan no Juusei" (Japanese: ヒマワリ館の銃声)	Kazuo Nogami	Sozo Tonami	August 6, 2001
Conan, Kogoro and Ran all go to an isolated mansion called the Sunflower building because every 12 hours it rotates. They are having a BBQ outside while the owner is inside when they hear a shot fired. They rush inside to find the owner shot through the forehead. After investigating, Conan discovers the culprit was one of the owner's students studying to be an architect. The student killed the owner because the owner stole his work and was getting an award for it.
246	27	"The Mystery in the Net (Part 1)"; Transliteration: "Ami ni Kakatta Nazo (Zenpen)" (Japanese: 網にかかった謎（前編）)	Nana Harada	N/A	August 13, 2001
Professor Agasa takes the Detective Boys and Conan at the beach during school break while Ran and Sonoko also happen to be on the exact beach. At night, all of them ate dinner in a hotel together with the lifeguards they met that morning. The man the lifeguards were supposed to meet didn't show up so they tried calling him but the only sound that could be heard was the sound of the waves. The 3 lifeguards decided to look for the man at the beach and found him on the shore dead, covered in scratches and wrapped in a fisherman's net.
247	28	"The Mystery in the Net (Part 2)"; Transliteration: "Ami ni Kakatta Nazo (Kōhen)" (Japanese: 網にかかった謎（後編）)	Minoru Tozawa	N/A	August 20, 2001
Conan figures out the culprit and decides to use Professor Agasa's voice to reveal the trick but remembers he forgot his voice changing bow tie at the hotel. Haibara arrives bringing with her Conan's bow tie. Conan tells Ayumi, Mitsuhiko and Genta to collect some things. After the three brought them, Conan, as Professor Agasa, reveals the trick the culprit used to kill the man. The victim, covered in fishnet, was placed in the shore where the culprit dug a hole fit for a man. He then placed a boat with sea water on top of the victim to serve as a weight so that when the victim wakes up he won't be able to escape when the tides rises up. The killer placed false evidence on the boat so that the police would think that the victim was placed inside the boat before letting him drown. The culprit then tells that he killed the man which was responsible for his father's death and that he only gathered all his courage to bestow divine punishment upon the man. Ran then tells the man that courage is a word that gives you the strength to do what's right and not to take someone else's life. Afterwards, Haibara comes up to Ran and introduces herself.
248	29	"The Alibi of the Soothing Forest"; Transliteration: "Iyashi no Mori no Aribai" (Japanese: 癒しの森のアリバイ)	Hiroshi Kurimoto	Yasue Sasano	August 27, 2001
While Conan, Ran and Kogoro are going sightseeing, the village head is killed by the somebody who visited the village head before post office lady. When Conan observing the clue around the crime scene, he figure out that the culprit was the victim's oldest son. With Sleeping Kogoro's deduction, Conan reveals the truth of the village head's death.
249	30	"The Idols' Secret (Part 1)"; Transliteration: "Aidoru-tachi no Himitsu (Zenpen)" (Japanese: アイドル達の秘密（前編）)	Mashu Ito	N/A	September 3, 2001
Ran and Kogoro get an invitation for an engagement party from his favorite idol Youko-chan. Kaoru the one who is getting engaged is another star and a former member of a group they all used to be in. She is a fan of Kogoro and wanted him to find out who was stalking her. Kaoru decides to take a bath. And the rest of the girl group decide to dress up and sing their old song to surprise her. Conan discovers blood leading to the door and they find her attacked. Bloody clothes are found outside which were made to make it seem like it was Kaoru's stalker but really is someone at the party.
250	31	"The Idols' Secret (Part 2)"; Transliteration: "Aidoru-tachi no Himitsu (Kōhen)" (Japanese: アイドル達の秘密（後編）)	Kazuo Nogami	N/A	September 10, 2001
Megure searches everyone for the murder weapon but it isn't found. Though they discover a listening device and find drawers tampered with. The hospital calls and Kaoru will make it. Meanwhile, Conan confronts the culprit who tried to kill Kaoru over a misunderstanding and overdoses on medicine to try and kill herself. But Conan saves her life. Kaoru apparently made up the rumor of the engagement to get her manager to notice her and they later become engaged. Note: This episode is aired the day before the September 11 attacks.
251	32	"The Tragedy at the OK Corral"; Transliteration: "OK-Bokujou no Higeki" (Japanese: OK牧場の悲劇)	Mashu Ito	Hiro Masaki	September 17, 2001
Because of Kogoro's love of horses he takes Conan and Ran to an OK corral ranch. One of their prize winning horses gets spooked and they all go running after her. They reach the horse and Conan finds blood on her horseshoe. They then find the farrier; one who shoes the horses, murdered. They find out that the farrier, had been meeting with a businessman who wanted to buy and ruin breeding any more horses that would save the ranch. Conan deduces that it wasn't an accident and that someone gave the horse chocolate which is a stimulant for horses. But it wasn't the cause for the death and was a cover-up for the real criminal. And that the murder weapon was the horseshoe that the person in haste put on wrong. The criminal confesses and had killed the farrier accidentally in self-defense.
252	33	"The Kidnapper in the Picture"; Transliteration: "E no Naka no Yuukaihan" (Japanese: 絵の中の誘拐犯)	Minoru Tozawa	Junichi Miyashita	October 8, 2001
Conan and the Detective Boys find out about a kidnapping case and decide to investigate. They look for places where the kidnapped boy might be hidden and Ayumi finds the culprit. She hides in his car and is taken to where the boy is being kept, and Conan knocks the kidnapper out by hitting him with a kicked paint can.
253	34	"Metropolitan Police Detective Love Story 4 (Part 1)"; Transliteration: "Honchou no Keiji Koi Monogatari 4 (Zenpen)" (Japanese: 本庁の刑事恋物語4（前編）)	Hiroshi Kurimoto	N/A	October 15, 2001
Satou is having an arranged marriage meeting with a man due to her mother's persistence. She arrives to find out it's Ninzaburo Shiratori. She proposes that if Takagi does not arrive to her before sunset, she will marry him whether she wants to or not. He accepts, but Takagi is busy with a store robbery. Three of the eye witnesses all give different descriptions and three culprits are kept in the back of the police car. Conan on the phone prepares to help Takagi solve the case as Kudo Shinichi.
254	35	"Metropolitan Police Detective Love Story 4 (Part 2)"; Transliteration: "Honchou no Keiji Koi Monogatari 4 (Kōhen)" (Japanese: 本庁の刑事恋物語4（後編）)	Kazuo Nogami	N/A	October 22, 2001
Takagi solves the case and arrests the culprit when he tries to make a dash out of the police car. Takagi catches up and gives up on going to Simone in time to stop the marriage as the sun is almost set and the car is too far away. His party comes to cheer him on and he runs. Conan manages to stop the marriage in time with Tomoaki Araide's help. Takagi manages to reach the restaurant but the sun has completely sunk. He then sees Satou around the corner who tells him he told her an emergency case has come up. Takagi smiles as he enters the car. Meanwhile Shiratori leaves the restaurant, disappointed in his closed marriage. Conan comments how Takagi and Satou reminded him of Ran and himself.
