= Case Closed season 12 =

Season of television series

Case Closed
- Season 12
- The cover of the first DVD compilation for season twelve of Detective Conan released by Shogakukan
- No. of episodes: 38

Release
- Original network: NNS (ytv)
- Original release: April 21, 2003 – March 1, 2004

Season chronology
- ← Previous; Season 11 Next → Season 13

The twelfth season of the Case Closed anime was directed by Yasuichiro Yamamoto (until episode 332) and Masato Satō (since episode 333) and produced by TMS Entertainment and Yomiuri Telecasting Corporation. The series is based on Gosho Aoyama's Case Closed manga series. In Japan, the series is titled Detective Conan (名探偵コナン, Meitantei Conan) but was changed due to legal issues with the title Detective Conan. The episodes' plot follows Conan Edogawa's daily adventures.

The episodes uses five pieces of theme music: two opening themes and three ending themes. The first opening theme is "Kaze no La La La" (風のららら, lit. "La La La of the Wind") by Mai Kuraki until episode 332 The second opening theme is "Kimi to Yakusoku Shita Yasashii Ano Basho Made" (君と約束した優しいあの場所まで, lit. "The Paradise I Promised You") by U-ka Saegusa in dB for the rest of the season. The first ending theme is "Ashita wo Yume Mite" (明日を夢見て, lit. "Dreaming of tomorrow") by Zard until episode 328. The second ending theme is "~Kimi to Iu Hikari~" (〜君という光〜, lit. "Your Light") by Garnet Crow until episode 349. The third ending theme is "Nemuru Kimi no Yokogao ni Hohoemi wo" (眠る君の横顔に微笑みを, lit. "The Smile on your Sleeping Face") by U-ka Saegusa in dB for the rest of the season.

The season initially ran from April 21, 2003, through March 1, 2004, on Nippon Television Network System in Japan. Episodes 316 to 353 were later collected into ten DVD compilations by Shogakukan. They were released between July 22, 2005, and November 25, 2005, in Japan.

Episode 345 was dubbed by Studio Nano as part of a curated episode list, which was released on Crunchyroll and Netflix on August 21, 2025.

== Episode list ==
No.	No. in season	Title	Directed by	Written by	Original air date
316	1	"The Sullied Masked Hero (Part 1)"; Transliteration: "Yogoreta Fukumen Hero (Zenpen)" (Japanese: 汚れた覆面ヒーロー（前編）)	Minoru Tozawa	N/A	April 21, 2003
Kogoro, Ran, and Conan attend a professional wrestling match where a wrestler challenges the legendary wrestler Wolf Face. Before the match begins, Wolf Face's challenger, Hyota Nagase is found dead in his room. A secret video camera reveals that a man wearing Wolf Face's mask murdered Hyota. Four wrestlers who have the same body structure as Wolf Face are gathered and interrogated by the police.
317	2	"The Sullied Masked Hero (Part 2)"; Transliteration: "Yogoreta Fukumen Hero (Kouhen)" (Japanese: 汚れた覆面ヒーロー（後編）)	Yoshio Suzuki	N/A	April 28, 2003
After rewatching the murder on the camera, Conan realizes how they will find the murderer. After tranquilizing Kogoro, Conan has the wrestlers wear Wolf Face's mask and tells them to walk in a straight line. The wrestler Iwao Ushigome is then labeled the murderer. Conan reveals that the Wolf Face in the camera had difficulty walking since he was not used to wearing the Wolf mask. As evidence, Conan reveals that the mask Ushigome was wearing was ripped and blood seeped onto the second mask he was wearing underneath; They find the second mask in Ushigome's jacket with Nagase's blood. Ushigome proceeds to attack the wrestlers but is incapacitated by Ran.
318	3	"The Lucky Cigar Case (Part 1)"; Transliteration: "Kouun no Shigaa Keesu (Zenpen)" (Japanese: 幸運のシガーケース（前編）)	Nana Harada	Shunsuke Ozawa	May 5, 2003
Kogoro, Ran and Conan are in a rental car when it breaks down in a mountain pass in the middle of nowhere. They can't use their cellphones so they find a building and knock and ask to use a phone. It is a massage chair development lab and 3 developers have come up with new prototypes. There is obvious tension between the 3 developers and the President of the company, and things get even more tense when one of the developers stabs the President and drives away, only to crash his car and die.
319	4	"The Lucky Cigar Case (Part 2)"; Transliteration: "Kouun no Shigaa Keesu (Kouhen)" (Japanese: 幸運のシガーケース（後編）)	Kazuyoshi Yokota	Shunsuke Ozawa	May 12, 2003
With security cameras, Conan manages to have some more information. The analysis of the route taken by the alleged offender, allows the boy to understand the facts as they occurred. Conan finds the offender and reveals all through Kogoro. The president is the real culprit: the man was believed to have killed the president and then flee with the car that the President had previously tampered with.
320	5	"Ninja Art: The Art of Alibi Construction"; Transliteration: "Ninpou Aribai Kousaku no Jutsu" (Japanese: 忍法アリバイ工作の術)	Hideaki Oniwa	Nobuo Ogizawa	May 19, 2003
Yuuichi Kusaka, a client of Kogoro's, is found dead in the park. Kogoro and Conan interrogate Yuuichi's sensei Ryuutarou Tsukigata, a novelist known for his books about ninjas and learn that Yuuichi called his sensei at 8:10 pm to tell him he arrived at the train station. Kogoro reveals the murderer should be Masaru Saruhashi and reveals that they were both competing to be Tsukigata's assistant. The police interrogate Saruhashi who has an alibi between the time of 8:00 and 9:00. Conan finds a key to the train's station locker. Realizing how the murder was done, Conan heads to the train station to confirm what the object in the locker was. Conan then sets up a meeting at Kogoro's office where the police and two suspects are gathered. After knocking Kogoro out with a tranquilizing and using his voice changing bow-tie to impersonate Kogoro, Conan reveals that Kusaka attempted to murder Saruhashi but was killed in self-defense. Conan reveals that Kusaka stored a bag containing his objects along with a tape recorder and phone timed to call Tsukigata at 8:10 to create an alibi; This is evidenced by a train ticket revealing the actual time Kusako was at the train station. After Kusaka's death, Saruhashi carries the body to the park and heads to a bar to create his alibi.
321	6	"The Kidnapper's Disappearing Getaway Car (Part 1)"; Transliteration: "Kieta Yuukai Tousousha (Zenpen)" (Japanese: 消えた誘拐逃走車（前編）)	Takeo Ohno	Hideki Hiroshima	May 26, 2003
Conan and the Detective Boys go to visit Jun, one of their friend who is hospitalized. The boy wants to go to game room and asks his friends to help him sneak out. The children accept and Conan takes the place of Jun in the hospital. A man enters the room, however, believing that Conan is Jun kidnaps Conan and asks for a ransom from Jun's family. Once delivered the ransom, the police puts it in the van where he travels the kidnapper, but after being in a tunnel, it disappears into thin air as if it never was.
322	7	"The Kidnapper's Disappearing Getaway Car (Part 2)"; Transliteration: "Kieta Yuukai Tousousha (Kouhen)" (Japanese: 消えた誘拐逃走車（後編）)	Minoru Tozawa	Takeo Ohno	June 2, 2003
Jun and Detective Boys back to the hospital and so the police understood that Conan was abducted as a hostage instead of Jun. Conan manages to escape from the place where it is locked, go to the hospital and is questioned by the police. Takagi and Conan understand the trick used by the kidnapper to get rid of the truck tunnel. Shortly after the inspector shall notify the detective who was found the corpse of the abductor and the man was killed by an accomplice. At first, the police suspect the stepmother of Jun but Conan manages to demonstrate that the real culprit is the driver of Jun's family.
323	8	"Heiji Hattori's Desperate Situation! (Part 1)"; Transliteration: "Hattori Heiji Zettai Zetsumei! (Zenpen)" (Japanese: 服部平次絶体絶命!（前編）)	Nana Harada	N/A	June 9, 2003
Heiji, Kazuha and a man named Kasukawa are held hostage in an attic of someone's home. Meanwhile, Conan, Ran, and Kogoro are tired of waiting for the two and begin searching for them based on clues from the last phone call. They investigate Detective Kasukawa's home and discover evidence that Heiji had been there. Conan finds a memo which discloses Kenbashi City, Ito Residence. They investigate those with the surname Ito but are unable to find information about Heiji. Meanwhile, it is revealed Heiji is held hostage by Misari Ito, an attorney who is the head of a tax evasion group. Ito demands Heiji to solve a code made by Kasukawa which contains a seven-digit-code to a safe box containing evidence of her scandal.
324	9	"Heiji Hattori's Desperate Situation! (Part 2)"; Transliteration: "Hattori Heiji Zettai Zetsumei! (Kouhen)" (Japanese: 服部平次絶体絶命!（後編）)	Kazuyoshi Yokota	N/A	June 16, 2003
While held at gunpoint, Heiji sends a modified version of the code to Kogoro and asks him to solve it. Conan manages to solve the code, realizing that K, Q, and J stand for King, Queen, and Jack and replaces them with numbers accordingly. Conan realizes the last three digits are actually letters and realizes what Heiji is trying to tell him and replies a modified code. Heiji tells Misari he will tell her the seven digits and they head to the bank. Heiji reveals that the numbers, if placed in a 3 by 3 diagram, will create a diagram of a dice with the 1's representing the dots on a dice. Heiji reveals that the code he sent Kogoro had the letters LIB meaning Libra which is referring to the scales Libra and the attorney badge Ito has; He explains that the code "Kogoro" replied with means to "Lure One of them Out". At Ito's home, Conan knocks out the two kidnappers and frees Kazuha. The police arrive later and apprehends the criminals.
325	10	"The Red Horse Within the Flames: The Case"; Transliteration: "Honoo no Naka ni Akai Uma (Jikenhen)" (Japanese: 炎の中に赤い馬（事件編）)	Hideaki Oba	N/A	June 23, 2003
Heiji is asked by Kasukawa to investigate a man who is lurking near the house of Ryoko Morozumi. An arsonist, dubbed the Red Horse after the red horse figurines he leaves behind at the fires, has been burning precincts in order. With the first three having already experienced a fire, and Ryoko's house being on the fourth precinct, they suspect the strange man to be the arsonist. While Kogoro, Conan, and Heiji stalk the house, it catches fire in the middle of the night. There are four suspected to be the arsonist: A salesman named Takanori Genda, Ryoko's paramour and a Feng shui reader Misao Soga, Ryoko's sister Keiko Gondou, and Ryoko's husband Akira Morozumi. Since the latter three have established alibi's, this leaves Genda as their prime suspect.
326	11	"The Red Horse Within the Flames: The Investigation"; Transliteration: "Honoo no Naka ni Akai Uma (Sousahen)" (Japanese: 炎の中に赤い馬（捜査編）)	Nana Harada	N/A	June 30, 2003
Ran and Kazuha receive a red horse from Genda on the way home. Kogoro realizes that Genda plans to burn the Mouri Agency with Ran and Kazuha in it and rushes home to find out that Genda had been arrested. Ran explains that Genda appeared at the Agency asking for the Red Horse back since it will cause the building to be set ablaze and she called the police due to his strange behavior. Conan and Heiji suspect that while Genda was the cause of the first three fires, the fourth fire might have been created to murder Ryoko while placing the blame on Genda. Conan and Heiji investigate and realize that Genda has been experience psychological problems and that the other three suspects could have manipulated him to cause the fires. They investigate Ryoko's house and realize how the fire was started.
327	12	"The Red Horse Within the Flames: The Resolution"; Transliteration: "Honoo no Naka ni Akai Uma (Kaiketsuhen)" (Japanese: 炎の中に赤い馬（解決編）)	Minoru Tozawa	N/A	July 7, 2003
After investigating Genda's home, they find out that there were covert listening devices in planted by Soga and Gondou and realize who the culprit is. That night, the three culprit enter Genda's house with Soga and Gondou retrieving their listening devices. Heiji and Conan confront Akira Morozumi before he could start a fire and declares him as the culprit. They reveal that Akira, Genda's psychiatrist, made him believe he was starting the fire but in reality, the first fire was an accident while the other three were done by Akira. Heiji reveals that Akira started the fourth fire by wrapping a light bulb with sheets of paper and placing a match in between the sheets. When it reached a certain temperature, the match would ignite and begin the fire. Conan reveals that the other two suspects merely used the listening device to trick Genda into believe they could predict his future. Akira is later arrested and Genda is released from custody.
328	13	"The Birthday Wine Mystery"; Transliteration: "Baasudee Wain no Nazo" (Japanese: バースデー·ワインの謎)	Hideaki Oba	Yutaka Yamada	July 14, 2003
Kogoro, Ran, and Conan are invited by Ran's friend to attend their small birthday party. There, a woman is poisoned from drinking wine, but her wine was given after someone else took a drink already. Conan figures out the trick and proves the culprit to be the murderer. The culprit reveals that the victim was his girlfriend who kept on buying expensive items leaving him in debt.
329	14	"A Friendship That Can't Be Bought (Part 1)"; Transliteration: "Okane de Kaenai Yuujou (Zenpen)" (Japanese: お金で買えない友情（前編）)	Kazuyoshi Yokota	N/A	July 28, 2003
Ayumi decides that on the Detective Boys camping trip, she will attempt to address Ai Haibara by her first name and to call her "Ai-chan". During the camping trip, they run into four college students who offer them a ride in their campervan to the top mountain to watch fireworks. While driving down the mountain, one of the four college students, Yasumi Shirafuji, is found on the road dead. Evidence atop the mountain suggests Shirafuji lost control of her bike and accidentally went over the cliff. Conan reveals that there is a lack of blood on the cement raising the possibility it was a murder made to look like an accident and that the suspects are the three college students.
330	15	"A Friendship That Can't Be Bought (Part 2)"; Transliteration: "Okane de Kaenai Yuujou (Kouhen)" (Japanese: お金で買えない友情（後編）)	Minoru Tozawa	N/A	August 4, 2003
After a thorough investigation, Conan finds out how the body was placed on the road and who the murderer is. Conan impersonates Agasa's voice and reveals that Shirafuji's body was murdered and placed atop the van. The culprit used the sunroof to hold down Shirafuji's body and wrapped her body in a plastic covering to reduce friction. When the sunroof was released, Shirafuji's body fell backwards while the campervan was in motion which explains why they found the body on the way back. Conan then reveals the culprit to be the college student Haruka Tendou, evidenced by her change of clothes. Conan reveals that her she changed to a pair of similar jeans but the design was slightly different and that she threw away her other jean as it contains Shirafuji's blood. Tendou confesses and reveals that she was pretending to be rich and she found out her friends knew the truth yet only used their relationship for money. During the ride back, Haibara allows Ayumi to call her "Ai-chan" upon accepting their friendship.
331	16	"The Suspicious Spicy Curry (Part 1)"; Transliteration: "Giwaku no Karakuchi Karee (Zenpen)" (Japanese: 疑惑の辛口カレー（前編）)	Katsuyoshi Yatabe	N/A	August 11, 2003
Kogoro, Ran, Sonoko, and a sick Conan meet tennis instructor Hiroto Akashi while on a trip to play tennis. It starts to rain heavily and their van is washed away, forcing the group to take shelter at Hiroto's house nearby. Hiroto introduces his adoptive father, Iwao, to everyone and has made spicy curry for dinner. When Ran goes to get Iwao's plate, she hears a muffle sound and goes back to the living room. She goes back a second time, at Hiroto's request, but finds Iwao hanging in his room, bleeding from his mouth. Inspector Yamamura is called to investigate; both he and Kogoro conclude that Iwao took his own life. Hiroto is considered the prime suspect, but he was washing dishes and witnesses to back his claim. Conan gets involved and finds a napkin with bite marks on it, a knotted lamp string, thin marks on Iwao's wrists, and something missing from the incident.
332	17	"The Suspicious Spicy Curry (Part 2)"; Transliteration: "Giwaku no Karakuchi Karee (Kouhen)" (Japanese: 疑惑の辛口カレー（後編）)	Hideaki Oba	N/A	August 18, 2003
Conan discovers the truth in Iwao Akashi's death but loses his voice in the process. He is certain that Hiroto, the victim's adopted son, killed him despite having a perfect alibi. Conan drops hints, allowing Kogoro, Sonoko, and Yamamura to accuse Hiroto. As noted by Conan, the large amount of curry was actually in anticipation of the group's arrival because he needed random people to witness Iwao's supposed suicide. After serving his adoptive father dinner, Hiroto hung Iwao by his mouth using a rope covered in a napkin and tied his hands behind his back with the lamp string. When Iwao could no longer hold himself up with his mouth, the rope slips from his mouth, effectively hanging and killing him, pulling out two teeth in the process. After the corpse was found, Hiroto fabricated a story how Iwao was suicidal and had dental work done on his mouth; this is contradicted by the fact that he ate curry like everyone else. He hid one of the teeth in the curry to conceal the evidence. Hiroto states that regardless if he had witnesses or not, he would have carried out his murder anyway. He confesses that Iwao spoke harshly at his wife's funeral, not realizing he was behind him. Hiroto is arrested for murder.
333	18	"The Similar Princesses (Part 1)"; Transliteration: "Nitamono Purinsesu (Zenpen)" (Japanese: 似た者プリンセス（前編）)	Nana Harada	N/A	August 25, 2003
Kogoro is hired by a rich man named Mikio Fujieda to find out who wants to kill him and had been promised ¥10 million after solving the case. Kogoro however spends ¥8 million and is unable to solve the case. Ran decides to call her mother, Eri Kisaki, to help solve the mystery. Conan, Ran, and Eri head to Fujieda's mansion to investigate only to run into Conan's mother, Yukiko who is investigating the mystery in place of her husband Yusaku. The two mothers reminiscence about a high-school pageant and how it ended in a tie due to a person not handing in their ballet. Ran reveals that Kogoro has an unhanded ballet from the contest which sparks the interest of the two. Later that night, Fujieda is caught on a camera after being shot.
334	19	"The Similar Princesses (Part 2)"; Transliteration: "Nitamono Purinsesu (Kouhen)" (Japanese: 似た者プリンセス（後編）)	Kazuyoshi Yokota	N/A	September 1, 2003
Conan investigates and realizes who the murderer is after receiving a hint from his father. Conan reveals the murderer to be the butler, Shouhachi Ueki. Conan reveals that Fujieda was drugged with Isoprenaline causing him to be stunned and dazed when he stood up to stretch causing them to believe that the culprit was in the room at the time of the murder. Conan explains that Fijieda was shot from outside the room. As evidence, Conan reveals that the coffee the butler served should contain traces of Isoprenaline and that the butler should have the silencer in him. Ueki confesses and reveals he murdered his Fujieda in order to preserve the garden his former master worked so hard to build. At the Mouri agency, Yukiko and Eri ask Kogoro who he voted for their high-school pageant. Kogoro reveals he voted by Eri since he thought Miss Teitan meant mistake and that it was a mistake for Eri to have entered the competition.
335	20	"Secret of the Tohto Film Development Studio (Part 1)"; Transliteration: "Touto Genzoujo no Himitsu (Zenpen)" (Japanese: 東都現像所の秘密（前編）)	Minoru Tozawa	N/A	September 8, 2003
Yukiko brings Conan, Ai and the detective boys to watch a Kamen Yaiba movie preview. Once there, they find out the movie has been delayed to later that night. Yukiko having to leave to catch her flight to America, leaves the kids in the care of Akira Hojima, one of the four employees of the Kamen Yaiba film. Before leaving, Yukiko tells Conan to be careful of the black car that has been following them. Akira takes the kids to his apartments near the studio and invites his fellow employees to a game of Mahjong. While everyone is asleep, they are awakened by a scream and find the salesman Furumura Norihiro murdered with a knife. Conan wonders how the murder was done in an impossible to see darkness without making a sound in a messy room.
336	21	"Secret of the Tohto Film Development Studio (Part 2)"; Transliteration: "Touto Genzoujo no Himitsu (Kouhen)" (Japanese: 東都現像所の秘密（後編）)	Kazuhito Kikuchi	N/A	September 15, 2003
The police investigate and find that Furumura's camera was turned on during the attack and reveals no suspicious sound was made. While the police suspect Akira to be the murderer, it is revealed the Akira and his two fellow employees have motives on murderer Furumura; Furumura ruined their previous film due to his careless handling of the negatives causing them a great loss in money to re-film the ruined sections. Conan calls Agasa over to reveal Akira as the murderer and to reveal Furumura's missing third shirt button had an important role in the murder. Later that day, the culprit returns to Akira's apartment to return the missing button. The police and Agasa appear revealing it was a set up to reveal the culprit to be the employee Yoshikiko Negami. Conan using his voice changing bow-tie voices through Agasa that Yoshikiko using fluorescent tape was able to cross the messy room quietly and with fluorescent paint covering Furumura's third button, was able to stab him in the heart. Yoshikiko confesses and reveals that the parts of the film Furumura ruined could never be re-filmed as one of the main side actors died. When the black car stalking them passes by, Conan reveals to Haibara he called Takagi to give the stalkers test on their blood alcohol content. Since the stalker is smoking, it means they lost track of them.
337	22	"Hidden Circumstances of the Falling Incident"; Transliteration: "Tenraku Jiken no Ura-jijou" (Japanese: 転落事件の裏事情)	Katsuyoshi Yatabe	Yoshifumi Fukushima	October 13, 2003
Kogoro and Conan are on their way home when they witness a struggle between two men over a backpack. Later, one of the men fell off the building and died. The police question the other man named Sanben. He said that his backpack was stolen while he was in the washroom, and he was trying to retrieve it from the other man, Kurin. However, the accident turned out to be a murder made to look like an accident. Sanben's motive was revenge for his girlfriend, whose death was supposedly caused by her dashing across the road, but was actually caused by the drunk Kurin whose car ran over her.
338	23	"The Four Porsches (Part 1)"; Transliteration: "Yon-dai no Porushe (Zenpen)" (Japanese: 4台のポルシェ（前編）)	Nana Harada	N/A	October 20, 2003
Conan and Agasa decided to bring a very sick Ai to the clinic, but the clinic happened to be filled and they had to wait at least 2 hours before their turn. They then decided to first have lunch at a nearby shopping mall. At the car park of the shopping mall, they spot four porsches, with a drunk man sleeping in one of them. Later, Conan and Agasa meet Ran, Sonoko and Jodie at a restaurant while Ai rested in Agasa's car. Conan noticed Jodie's suspicions when she heard Ran mention Ai. He was then interviewed by a TV crew and decided to return to the car and bring Ai away as he knew he could have been spotted by people from the Organization through television. However, when he returned to the car park, the man in the Porsche was found dead, and Conan has to solve the case.
339	24	"The Four Porsches (Part 2)"; Transliteration: "Yon-dai no Porushe (Kouhen)" (Japanese: 4台のポルシェ（後編）)	Hideaki Oba	N/A	October 27, 2003
Ai and Agasa could not leave the shopping mall as the exit was blocked by the police. While with Dr. Araide, Jodie notices the sick Ai in Agasa's car and remembers her from the bus hijacking case. Jodie thinks she knows Ai's true identity. With the function of each type of car, Conan found the trick of culprit and who make victim strangle to death. After Conan solved the case, Vermouth is shown in her room and she apparently knows where Sherry is.
340	25	"The Secret Hidden in the Bathroom (Part 1)"; Transliteration: "Toire ni Kakushita Himitsu (Zenpen)" (Japanese: トイレに隠した秘密（前編）)	Minoru Tozawa	N/A	November 3, 2003
This episode reveals bits and pieces of Ai's family. Ai knows very little about her parents, and considers her mother a cold and mysterious woman, nicknamed Hell Angel by the Organization. Professor Agasa then brought Conan and her to the house of her father's old friend, who is also a professor. Later, after leaving the bathroom, that professor is murdered, leading Ai to believe the Black Organization is behind it.
341	26	"The Secret Hidden in the Bathroom (Part 2)"; Transliteration: "Toire ni Kakushita Himitsu (Kouhen)" (Japanese: トイレに隠した秘密（後編）)	Katsuyoshi Yatabe	N/A	November 10, 2003
From the track of poison, Conan discovers the trick of poisoning the professor to death. Conan solves the case and retrieves the secret that Akemi hid in the bathroom. It turned out to be a set of cassette tapes, recorded by Elena, Akemi and Ai's deceased mother, for Ai's birthday every year right up till the year she turns 20. The episode ended with Conan saying that Ai's mother was a true angel.
342	27	"The Bride of Huis Ten Bosch^{1 hr.}" Transliteration: "Hausutenbosu no Hanayome" (Japanese: ハウステンボスの花嫁)	Kazuyoshi Yokota	Toyoto Kogiso	November 17, 2003
Sonoko invites Ran and Conan to attend a wedding between Shinya Ooga and Akane Katori at the Huis Ten Bosch. On the way there, the three meet a glass artisan named Junichi Takahashi who accompanies them to the Huis Ten Bosch to the glass museum. Shinya's grandmother, Tae Ooga, impressed by Takahashi's knowledge on glass invites him to dinner with the Ooga family. That night, Shinya's parents offer Akane an heirloom wedding ring for the wedding and invite Takahashi to attend the wedding. Before the wedding begins, the ring is found missing and in its place is a picture of Akane with Hydrangea Otakusas in the background. Conan realizes that the flower refers to Philipp Franz von Siebold's Japanese wife, Taki (滝, lit. Waterfall) and finds the ring on a flowing fountain depicting the ending to Greek mythology Cupid and Psyche. Conan soon learns that Akane has been kidnapped and finds her in a carillon in the amusement park. She reveals that Takahashi plans to kill her grandmother-in-law by using bombs in her blimp. Conan manages to incapacitate Takahashi before he detonates the explosives. As Shinya's whole family gathers to the scene, Conan tranquilizes Sonoko and explains that Shinya's sister, Mika Ooga, and grandmother hid the ring to test Akane's resolve, evidenced by where the ring was found and how the situation relates to the Greek mythology. Conan then reveals that Takahashi was trying to avenge his teacher, Akane's father, by murdering Tae. Takahashi regains consciousness and explains Akane's father committed suicide when the Ooga's family bank ordered him to pay back the money he burrowed. Shinya's uncle reveals that they had delayed Akane's father's debt for a year and that the money needed to make the glass was more than the profit when selling them which furthered Akane's father's debt. Takahashi, realizing the Ooga are not to blame collapses in grief. After the wedding, Ran receives the thrown bouquet which causes Conan to run away from the wedding.
343	28	"The Convenience Store Trap (Part 1)"; Transliteration: "Konbini no Otoshiana (Zenpen)" (Japanese: コンビニの落とし穴（前編）)	Hideaki Oba	N/A	December 1, 2003
Jodie is planning to leave, and Ran and Sonoko, stunned by the news, decide to throw her a going away party. They go into the store and find young woman named Aya being accused of shoplifting by her boss. They manage to come up with three possible suspects. Ran attempts to call Shinichi or Conan for help, since both are better at solving mysteries, but surprisingly, Jodie stops her and tells her to use her own deduction.
344	29	"The Convenience Store Trap (Part 2)"; Transliteration: "Konbini no Otoshiana (Kouhen)" (Japanese: コンビニの落とし穴（後編）)	Masato Sato	N/A	December 8, 2003
Aya's boss threatens to fire her and call the police if the case isn't solved, leaving Ran as her only hope. Ran speaks to Shinichi before sharing her deduction. She yells about a fire, forcing the culprit, who was hiding in the store, to reveal him. From there, Ran explains her theory, and he confesses his actions. Later, Ran discovers pictures of Shinichi, Conan, and Ai at Jodie's house.
345	30	"Confrontation with the Black Organization: Night of the Full Moon Mystery^{2.5 hrs.}" / "The Confrontation with the Black Organization: Night of the Full Moon Dual Mystery"; Transliteration: "Kuro no Soshiki to Makkou Shoubu Mangetsu no Yoru no Nigen Misuterii" (Japanese: 黒の組織と真っ向勝負満月の夜の二元ミステリー)	Minoru Tozawa Masato Sato	N/A	January 5, 2004
Kogoro receives an invitation to a Halloween cruise; the Halloween cruise is famous for hiring guests to star in a horror film. Conan receives the same invitation from Vermouth; the invitation however is addressed to Conan Edogawa and Shinichi Kudo, meaning Vermouth knows his true identity. During the cruise, the party members are divided into groups with team devil consisting of Kogoro, Sonoko, and people disguised as a werewolf, a mummy, a medusa, a Frankenstein Monster, and an invisible man. During the party, the host is shot by a crossbow, and attached to the arrow is a card from team devil. The Mummy is the prime suspect since he lacks an alibi and his card is missing. The invisible man gathers the party guests to the bow of the boat and reveals his identity as Shinichi and declares the werewolf as the murderer. He reveals that the werewolf placed his mask on the Mummy to establish his own alibi, evidenced when the Werewolf came out of the Mummy's bathroom stall. To support this, Shinichi points to the fact that the Werewolf claimed he was busy concentrating on staying in character so he could be hired to star in the movie, yet he was drinking a dry Martini, also known as a silver bullet and thus disproves his lie. As evidence, Shinichi reveals that there was glass shards on the balcony where the host was killed and that there should be glass shards embedded in the soles of the Werewolf's shoes. The Werewolf confesses and reveals that Vermouth held his family hostage and blackmailed him to murder the host. Elsewhere, Haibara is picked up by Jodie while they are stalked by Dr. Araide. Jodie confronts Araide at the pier who reveals that he is Vermouth in disguise. Back at the party, Shinichi Kudo is revealed to be Harley Hartwell in disguise; this was done to distract Vermouth from noticing Conan's absence. Haibara is revealed to be Conan in disguise, and he attempts to subdue Vermouth. However, the real Haibara arrives at the pier and is narrowly saved from death by Ran's timely appearance. Shuichi Akai's appearance prompts Vermouth to take Conan hostage and flee the scene. Conan reveals to Vermouth he has a covert listening device on him that will send everything that was said to the authorities in the event of his death. Vermouth uses sleeping gas on Conan and tells him she will postpone her plan for murdering Haibara for now. Conan awakens to find out the device has been destroyed and no evidence of the Black Organization remain.
346	31	"Find the Buttocks' Mark (Part 1)"; Transliteration: "Oshiri no Maaku wo Sagase (Zenpen)" (Japanese: お尻のマークを探せ（前編）)	Katsuyoshi Yatabe	N/A	January 12, 2004
Conan and Haibara, along with the other Detective Boys, are walking home from school discussing the previous event that occurred, meanwhile Ran and Sonoko visit Jodie who is in the hospital recovering from her injury. Jodie explains to Ran and Sonoko that she is an FBI agent and tells them a makeshift story to hide the fact that Haibara's life is in danger. Afterwards, Jodie's superior comes in and they talk about getting Haibara in the witness protection program. As Ayumi left the rest to go home, she ran into the Phantom Killer, but with many witnesses around, he fled the scene. The only clue is the mark on Ayumi's hand from the item that the culprit dropped on the ground and quickly retrieved. It is later discovered to be the symbol of a car brand as the same mark was also imprinted on Genta's rear end as he sat on Satou's car.
347	32	"Find the Buttocks' Mark (Part 2)"; Transliteration: "Oshiri no Maaku wo Sagase (Kōhen)" (Japanese: お尻のマークを探せ（後編）)	Nana Harada	N/A	January 19, 2004
The investigation led to three suspects, all three have that model of car, do not have an alibi for the time of the attack and said they had lost the original key (the culprit can not produce data that may be bloody). Ayumi would like to see up close the three suspects but it is not recommended for her because of possible revenge from the offender in the case were released for lack of evidence. After several investigations Conan discover who is guilty and has used that trick to make sure that they could not be found traces of blood on the lock of the car. Later, the man confessed to assaulting people just to get some evil reputation and experience strong emotions. Eventually, the boys ask to Ayumi if he was afraid but she responded in the negative: he knew that Conan and the others would always be with you. After hearing those words, Ai runs from Jodie and announced that she had decided to reject the witness protection program. Jodie realizes how she feels and wishes her good luck.
348	33	"Love, Ghosts, and World Heritage (Part 1)"; Transliteration: "Ai to Yuurei to Chikyuu Isan (Zenpen)" (Japanese: 愛と幽霊と地球遺産（前編）)	Katsuyoshi Yatabe	Junichi Miyashita	January 26, 2004
Ran, Conan and Kogoro with the Detective Kids arrive at an inn. There they meet another tourist group and a very rude man (who eventually leaves to another inn). During dinner the owner gets angry reading an article which says the inn is haunted and that's why it's popular. Later, the kids leave to search for the ghost, not before Conan sees the owner's wife sobbing outside. They join the townspeople patrolling, when Ayumi sees a girl calling her and is lost. Everyone searches for her and she's found unconscious beside a tree. When she says that she saw a girl, the inn landlady tells her that the girl's name is Mami, who believed in Eiji's innocence. But the inn owner says that's impossible since they dies 10 years ago! He angrily denies Eiji being his son and says they are all putting up a show. The Detective Kids decide to investigate. They find out the Mami's home, but its abandoned. They also find out from Agasa that Eiji committed suicide, before which he was suspected for jewellery theft, due to fingerprints left at the scene of crime. Ayumi takes them to the place she saw Mami disappearing, and they find a piece of new cloth there. At night, they catch a person at the top of the inn and when the owner tries to stop him from escaping, he plunges him with a knife and escapes. Just then they hear Ran's scream, and they see Mami's ghost near the knife.
349	34	"Love, Ghosts, and World Heritage (Part 2)"; Transliteration: "Ai to Yuurei to Chikyuu Isan (Kōhen)" (Japanese: 愛と幽霊と地球遺産（後編）)	Hideaki Oba	Junichi Miyashita	February 2, 2004
The owner is taken to the hospital. Kogoro is requested to investigate the case. Even as Kogoro starts his wronog deductions, the kids continue investigating, and find that the road where the knife was leads to an end, meaning that the criminal is someone from the village or one of the tourists. The next day, the kids start searching for whatever the criminal was searching for in the attic. Ai observes that they can clearly see the place where the owner, Nagakura, was attacked last night, which means that even the owner could see who was in the attic. Conan rushes to the place and finds a lacquer tree there, which was the reason the owner fainted. They see the rude tourist, Kawaji, being surrounded by villagers and Ai tells them that Nagakura was part of a group that was for registering the village as a World Heritage (but there was also another group against it). Kawaji is a World Heritage inspector who came to determine whether the village should be a World Heritage, but he accepted bribes from various villages and also asked some from Nagakura. Kawaji is arrested as a suspect since his house was right where Nagakura had passed out. The kids come to know from the inspector that the Nagakura and the Otozawa's houses were exchanged, and that their places were exchanged. Conan searches the attic of the abandoned house and finds the stolen jewels. That night, the kids then hide in the attic and wait for the criminal. The criminal turns out to be Sakaki, the missing jewel appriser. He had forced Eiji, who was in debt, to help him in the robbery and had also killed the guard and later Eiji, to hide his own crime.
350	35	"The Forgotten Cell Phone (Part 1)"; Transliteration: "Wasureta Keitai Denwa (Zenpen)" (Japanese: 忘れた携帯電話（前編）)	Yukio Okazaki	N/A	February 9, 2004
Kogoro takes Conan to a restaurant, where the waitress called Azusa, asks for his help to find the owner of a lost cell phone. She tells them that a person called the cell three times, but she feels that it might not be the cell's owner that's calling, since, the first time, he said "Sorry, must be wrong number", the second time "Huh, did you hear anything ring right now?" and the third time, with a completely different tone, "Hey, you're his girl, right? Give back the phone or I'll kill you!" After this, scared, she switched the phone off but she hasn't received any calls after switching it on again. Conan finds that the phone doesn't connect. Azusa tells him that the customer wore glasses, was chubby, with a side-parted hair, and kept playing games on the phone. The first call came after an hour after he left, soon the second one, and the third 30 mins after that. They find that the names and the numbers in the contact list seem to be fake and weird things about them: some names have a dot after them and some don't; the first names are in katana and the surnames in kanji; the numbers are 10 digits starting with 1. She also tells them the phone was left under a seat, with the antenna still out, and she found it only because it rang. The serial number sticker on the phone is torn off. Also, the customer asked for many food items, which amounted to exactly 3000 yen and asked for a receipt without giving his name. Inspector Yumi comes asking for Kogoro's help, saying the person with the receipt had died the day before in an accident. She also tells them that the man was hit by the truck, which was neither speeding, nor had a drunk driver, when he was crossing the street, hurrying to a store named Poirot. He also carried a lot of receipts on him from stores all around. Conan suggests finding the name and address of the victim and the id of the caller from the telephone company.
351	36	"The Forgotten Cell Phone (Part 2)"; Transliteration: "Wasureta Keitai Denwa (Kōhen)" (Japanese: 忘れた携帯電話（後編）)	Shinji Takago	N/A	February 16, 2004
From the phone company, they confirm the three calls, but they are made from different places. The person's name and address were only asked during the last call, when they heard a loud sound and the call was abruptly cut off. Yumi first calls Beiko station where they are informed of a dangerous looking man in a long coat, who was hesistating to make the call and the loud noise may be the announcements. Yumi then calls the Apollo sports shop, where a crew-cut man whose phone's battery was dead came, and the loud noise might have been the construction noise from outside. The third place is Colombo restaurant, where a regular customer in sunglasses made a call after borrowing change. Here the loud noise turns out to be from the campaign car which is everywhere now-a-days. Yumi asks him to call back when the customer comes back. Conan finds out that most of the numbers are very close to each other, suggesting they might be neighbours. Also the numbers from 1032 to 1100 are missing. Azusa suggests they might infer dates from Oct to Nov. Conan suggests that the phone was placed in a way that would be easy to find it once it rings, which suggests that it was meant to be exchanged with someone. He suggests that the victim might have gotten the place wrong, since he was new to the area, hence he was hurrying. They deduce that the victim might have gotten the store's name wrong, since they were based on detectives. They come to Colombo, and upon asking the owner, they find that customer was asking the owner if he found a lost phone. Conan tranquilizes Kogoro and reveals the truth.
352	37	"The Tragedy of The Fishing Tournament (Part 1)"; Transliteration: "Fisshingu Taikai no Higeki (Zenpen)" (Japanese: フィッシング大会の悲劇（前編）)	Minoru Tozawa	Toyoto Kogiso	February 23, 2004
Ran and Conan were invited to a fishing tournament that was being sponsored by Sonoko's father's company. After hearing that, Genta, Ayumi and Mitsuhiko wanted to come along as well. During the tournament, they met Ayukawa Saori and Masubuchi Takuya, both participants, and Funaki Toshihiko, a freelance writer. On the second day of the tournament, Funaki was found dead by Ran and Sonoko near the lake.
353	38	"The Tragedy of The Fishing Tournament (Part 2)"; Transliteration: "Fisshingu Taikai no Higeki (Kōhen)" (Japanese: フィッシング大会の悲劇（後編）)	Kazuyoshi Yokota	Toyoto Kogiso	March 1, 2004
Conan and the Detective Boys continued their investigation. They later found out that Funaki-san was murdered in a different place. Meanwhile, Masubuchi-san was being suspected by Inspector Worthington for the lack of alibi.

== Notes ==
- ^2 hrs. Two hour long special episode.
- ^2.5 hrs. Two and a half hour long special episode.
