= Case Closed season 10 =

Season of television series

Case Closed
- Season 10
- The cover of the first DVD compilation for season ten of Detective Conan released by Shogakukan
- No. of episodes: 31

Release
- Original network: NNS (ytv)
- Original release: October 29, 2001 – July 8, 2002

Season chronology
- ← Previous; Season 9 Next → Season 11

The tenth season of the Case Closed anime was directed by Yasuichiro Yamamoto and produced by TMS Entertainment and Yomiuri Telecasting Corporation. The series is based on Gosho Aoyama's Case Closed manga series. In Japan, the series is titled Detective Conan (名探偵コナン, Meitantei Conan) but was changed due to legal issues with the title Detective Conan. The episodes' plot follows Conan Edogawa's daily adventures.

The episodes use five pieces of theme music: three opening themes and two closing themes. The first opening theme is "Destiny" by Miki Matsuhashi until episode 258 The second opening theme is "Winter Bells" by Mai Kuraki until episode 270. The third opening theme is "I can't stop my love for you♥" by Rina Aiuchi for the rest of the season. The first ending theme is "Aoi Aoi Kono Chikyuu ni" (青い青いこの地球に, lit. "The Blue Blue Earth") by Azumi Uehara until episode 265. The second ending theme is "Yumemita Ato de" (夢みたあとで, lit. "After I Dream") by Garnet Crow for the rest of the season.

The season initially ran from October 29, 2001, through July 8, 2002, on Nippon Television Network System in Japan. Episodes 255 to 285 were later collected into nine DVD compilations by Shogakukan. They were released between October 22, 2004, and February 25, 2005, in Japan.

Episodes 258, 259 and 277 to 280 were dubbed by Studio Nano as part of a curated episode list, which was released on Crunchyroll and Netflix on May 1, 2026.

== Episode list ==
No. overall	No. in season	Title	Directed by	Written by	Original release date
255	1	"The 14th Round of the Matsue Tamatsukuri Linked Verse Contest (Part 1)"; Transliteration: "Matsue Tamatsukuri Renku Juuyonban Shoubu (Zenpen)" (Japanese: 松江玉造連句14番勝負（前編）)	Mashu Ito	Kazunari Kochi	October 29, 2001
Kogoro wins a trip to Matsue from a lottery drawing, and while there they meet and join up with a Linked Verse group, which is a type of poetry. One of their members, a loan dealer, is killed, and Conan finds out that almost everyone has a motive to kill.
256	2	"The 14th Round of the Matsue Tamatsukuri Linked Verse Contest (Part 2)"; Transliteration: "Matsue Tamatsukuri Renku Juuyonban Shoubu (Kōhen)" (Japanese: 松江玉造連句14番勝負（後編）)	Nana Harada	Kazunari Kochi	November 5, 2001
Conan hasn't figured out who the culprit is, so he gets Kogoro to participate in their Linked Verse Contest so he can have more time to observe the suspects. Conan is able to find out the killer is Shiina-san, who killed the loan dealer because he scammed their group out of money.
257	3	"The Extremely Strange Punishment from Heaven"; Transliteration: "Yo nimo Kimyou na Tenbatsu" (Japanese: 世にも奇妙な天罰)	Minoru Tozawa	Nobuo Ogizawa	November 12, 2001
Conan and the Detective Boys are out walking around the town the morning after an earthquake when they hear a scream. They see a woman cradling a man bleeding, and they call an ambulance and the man is saved. He says he was robbed and 200,000 yen ($2,000) was stolen from. They have a suspect, but he has an alibi of committing another crime when the man was attacked.
258	4	"The Man from Chicago (Part 1)"; Transliteration: "Shikago Kara Kita Otoko (Zenpen)" (Japanese: シカゴから来た男（前編）)	Hideaki Oniwa	N/A	November 19, 2001
The Detective Boys attend an animal show involving a white lion named Leon. Outside, a man named James Black, is mistaken by reporters for Randy Hawks, a rich man who sponsors zoos and animal shows. The Detective Boys lead him out of the crowd of reporters by pretending he is their English Teacher. As return for their help, Black offers to treat them for lunch and leaves to get his car, only to be mistaken for Hawks and kidnapped for ransom. Growing concerned, the Detective Boys search for Black; Their investigation leads them to believe he was kidnapped. They find Black's strap from the animal show in an alley way and discover blood on the letters P, &, A on the strap.
259	5	"The Man from Chicago (Part 2)"; Transliteration: "Shikago Kara Kita Otoko (Kōhen)" (Japanese: シカゴから来た男（後編）)	Kazuo Nogami	N/A	November 26, 2001
Ayumi notices that Black still has her Detective Badge, allowing Conan to trace the signal and have Sato set up a road block intercepting the vehicle. The kidnappers manage to elude the road block since their vehicle is disguised as a police car. Conan discerns the message P & A, revealing that when alphabetized, spell "panda". Conan concludes Black is referring to the black and white colors of a panda to police cars. Since the kidnappers are armed, Conan tells the police a plan to save Black safely. The police feign a car chase and slowly surround the kidnappers car; They suddenly break throwing them off guard and apprehends the criminals. Black disappears before he is questioned and is driven away by the mysterious Shuichi Akai.
260	6	"The Shaking Restaurant"; Transliteration: "Yureru Resutoran" (Japanese: 揺れるレストラン)	Mashu Ito	Takeo Ohno	December 3, 2001
Conan, Kogoro, and Ran go to a restaurant that is shaking because of construction next door. They go back the next day only to find that the man running the restaurant is dead. At first it looks like the construction made a vase fall over and hit him on the head, killing the owner, however, the construction wasn't happening at the estimated time of death. Then Kogoro accidentally hits his head and suddenly becomes a very good detective and solves the case. But as usually he missed something, therefore Conan puts him out and finishes the deduction show.
261	7	"The Fearful Legend of the Snowy Night (Part 1)"; Transliteration: "Yuki no Yoru no Kyoufu Densetsu (Zenpen)" (Japanese: 雪の夜の恐怖伝説（前編）)	Hideki Nagasaki	Chiaki Hashiba Fumiko Komatsuzaki	December 10, 2001
Conan, Kogoro, and Ran are driving to a hot spring when the road gets closed due to snow, and so they accept an offer of staying the night at a nearby house. The next day they discover the body of the company president dead and when they follow the footprints, they find his eldest son dressed up in armor and also dead in a locked room. The company president's wife declares that they were killed by the spirit of a 500-year-old samurai whose death anniversary was that day.
262	8	"The Fearful Legend of the Snowy Night (Part 2)"; Transliteration: "Yuki no Yoru no Kyoufu Densetsu (Kōhen)" (Japanese: 雪の夜の恐怖伝説（後編）)	Kazuo Nogami Mashu Ito	Chiaki Hashiba Fumiko Komatsuzaki	December 17, 2001
During the informal investigation, Conan discovers that the footprints of the armor in the snow were used to cover up the culprit's footprints, and finds that the locked room the son died in was set up. Then Conan detect the unusual point of the Crime Scene where son died. Thus Conan the informal investigation of the case lay down Kogoro with his watch to tells everyone that the culprit was the maid, who killed them because they made her father commit suicide.
263	9	"The Osaka Double Mystery – Naniwa Swordsman and Toyotomi's Castle^{2 hrs.}" Transliteration: "Oosaka Daburu Misuterii: Naniwa Kenshi to Taikō no Shiro" (Japanese: 大阪ダブルミステリー 浪花剣士と太閤の城)	Akira Shimizu	N/A	January 7, 2002
Heiji invites Conan to his kendo tournament but a drunk man named Atsushi Tarumi is found dead in the storage room. Heiji comes to investigate only to find that the body had somehow been moved to the shower room without anyone noticing. After a thorough investigation, Heiji reveals the culprit to be Takashi Kategawa, a friend of Tarumi. Heiji explains that in the storage room, Kategawa drugged Tarumi into a drunken slumber and put red paint on Tarumi to imply he was killed. After everyone leaves, he sets the scene to create the idea Tarumi committed a murder in his drunken frenzy. Tarumi heads for the shower room, suited in Tsuba Zeriai, in order to hide what he believed to be blood from the murder where he is then killed by Kategawa. As evidence, Heiji reveals that the mannequin that was used to trick Tarumi into believing he committed a murder was covered in red paint. After Tarumi is arrested, Heiji and Conan explore the town. Later a man is set ablaze atop Osaka Castle. After investigating thoroughly, Heiji and Conan concludes the murderer to be Shigehiko Wakisaka, one of the tour guides at the castle who committed the murders through the use of self-destructing flashlights. Wakisaka confesses and reveals that he was murdering his fellow tour guides who murdered his grandfather thirteen years ago. Arihiro Kasuya, one of the tour guides, confesses to have murdered Wakisaka's grandfather and prepares to kill Heiji but is apprehended by the police.
264	10	"Courtroom Battle: Kisaki vs. Kogoro (Part 1)"; Transliteration: "Hōtei no Taiketsu: Kisaki tai Kogorō (Zenpen)" (Japanese: 法廷の対決 妃VS小五郎（前編）)	Yoshio Suzuki	Yutaka Kaneko	January 14, 2002
Eri Kisaki is the attorney for a man named Shinji Usami who is convicted for the murder of Tsuyoshi Hirasawa while in a drunken state. On the prosecution side is her rival, Reiko Kujo, dubbed "The Madonna of Prosecutors." It is discovered that Tsuyoshi pushed Masaki Usami, Shinji's son, down a flight of stairs resulting in his death, giving Shinji a valid motive. During Tsuyoshi's murder investigation, a metal pipe was found along with car keys that belonged to Shinji. He takes responsibility but the facts don't add up with the case. Kogoro was at the bar near the crime scene and serves as a witness. Eri attempts to confirm Usami's alibi through his estranged wife Masako Kamedo. Kamedo reveals that Hiraswa visited her bar and that Kogoro should be able to confirm it. Kogoro reveals that he fell asleep at the bar, and was waken by Kamedo who told him he had a phone call; The time on the phone proves that Usami was at the bar at the time of the murder. During the hearing, Reiko calls Kogoro to the witness stand, leaving Eri baffled and Conan concerned.
265	11	"Courtroom Battle: Kisaki vs. Kogoro (Part 2)"; Transliteration: "Houtei no Taiketsu: Kisaki tai Kogorou (Kōhen)" (Japanese: 法廷の対決 妃VS小五郎（後編）)	Mashu Ito	Yutaka Kaneko	January 21, 2002
Conan explains that Reiko is taking advantage of Eri's history with Kogoro by using him on her side. Kameda confesses to changing the time on Kogoro's phone, thus destroying Shinji's alibi. This strategy gives Reiko the victory, prompting Kogoro to investigate on his own. Conan reviews the past investigation on Hiwasawa's murder and discovers that a baby octopus was found in his stomach. During the second hearing, Conan tranquilizes Kogoro and reveals The fact that Hiwasawa had baby octopus in his stomach, which is only served at her Kameda's bar, places Kameda within his vicinity and the crime scene. She then killed Hiwasawa with the metal pipe at the construction site. Shinji witnessed this, and in an attempt to incriminate himself, he placed his keys at the crime scene. Kameda confesses and admits she wanted to avenge her son. After the hearing, Eri asks Kogoro if he would like to go to a restaurant with her only to be ignored by Kogoro who is distracted by a beautiful woman.
266	12	"The Truth Behind Valentine's (The Case)"; Transliteration: "Barentain no Shinjitsu (Jikenhen)" (Japanese: バレンタインの真実（事件編）)	Hideaki Oniwa	N/A	January 28, 2002
Sonoko invites Ran, bringing along Conan and Kogoro, to come to a house in the hills where their chocolates are blessed with good fortune for love. Once there, they meet the lodge owner Chiyoko Yuasa and her guests: photographer Yoshitaka Nigaki, his girlfriend Ako Amari, Mika Konokawa, two hunters Hajime Itakura, Yuzo Sakami looking for a legendary Japanese wolf, and Chiyoko's pet dog Subaru. The females there start making chocolate as gifts for the one they love. Sonoko makes hers for Makoto and Ran leaves hers nameless. Nigaki leaves to take photos but a snowstorm occurs, which would normally force him to return to the lodge, but he doesn't. Conan and Subaro set out to find Nigaki and they do, though bludgeoned to death; the weapon is discovered near his body. Ako's chocolate candy is found in his lap and someone attempted to wipe blood from Nigaki's face. Kogoro determines that Nigaki was murdered during the afternoon but Conan points out that the killer repositioned his glasses after killing him. What has Conan baffled the most is how and why did the killer leave Ako's chocolate in Nigaki's lap.
267	13	"The Truth Behind Valentine's (The Reasoning)"; Transliteration: "Barentain no Shinjitsu (Suirihen)" (Japanese: バレンタインの真実（推理編）)	Toru Kitahata	N/A	February 4, 2002
Nigaki's corpse is left to preserve evidence. Kogoro takes Nigaki's recorder and camera to find leads but only discovers two completely black photos and one stained with blood. Apparently the murder takes place before the snowstorm but Conan feels like there's a trick to it. It is impossible for one to bring chocolate from the lodge to Nigaki's corpse which is 20 minutes away given the snow storm in effect. Itakura claims he shot a suspicious person wearing a wool hat and Conan fears it might have been Akai Shuichi. Mika believes the man to be Nattsuya, her boyfriend and Ako's brother, who was killed in an avalanche 4 years ago. Indeed, there is a suspicious individual lurking about the lodge. Subaro is revealed to have a twin named Jiro, and both have received awards from the government for helping travelers who lost their way in the mountains. While examining the chocolates, Conan gets to the bottom of the case and has a general idea of who brutally killed Nigaki.
268	14	"The Truth Behind Valentine's (The Resolution)"; Transliteration: "Barentain no Shinjitsu (Kaiketsuhen)" (Japanese: バレンタインの真実（解決編）)	Hideki Hiroshima	N/A	February 11, 2002
Kogoro is tranquilized, and Conan first explains that Jiro, the mistaken legendary Japanese wolf and Subaro's thought-to-be-dead twin, is the one who brought chocolates to Nigaki's corpse and licked his face in an attempt to wake him up, explaining why blood looked like it been wiped away. Next, the blood on the photo actually came when Nigaki accidentally cut himself while chopping chocolate. He switched rolls, but the killer swapped it back to the bloody film, told Nigaki to take pictures, then killed him and put glasses on his face to make it appear he was murdered earlier than expected. Ako Amari, Nigaki's girlfriend, is revealed to be the murderer as she is the only one who can change his rolls without raising suspicion. There is footage of Ako approaching Nigaki just moments before his actual time of death. Ako confesses that she was enraged how Nigaki filmed Nattsuya, her brother, dying in an avalanche and did nothing, in reality, he was filming evidence and planned to report the incident to the police. Itakura and Sakami suddenly betray everyone and thank Ako for killing Nigaki who they planned to murder to avoid blackmail; they confess to have caused the avalanche that killed Nattsuya. Just then, the suspicious man comes in and knocks Itakura out. Sakami shoots the goggles off, revealing Makoto. Ran knocks Sakami out with a kick. Makoto demands Sonoko to tell her who is the other boy she is dating as he has not received any of her gifts. He gets ready to fight until Sonoko tells him the chocolate was for him. Later on Ran cries because of Shinichi while Conan watches in the shadows. Ran wakes up to find her jacket blanketing her. She received a picture of herself sleeping from Detective Kid who is Conan with Shinichi's voice. Conan pretended Shinichi paid a visit and ate her chocolate due to hunger while she was asleep. Ran becomes angry due to Shinichi not waking her up to meet him.
269	15	"The Forgotten Memento from the Crime (Part 1)"; Transliteration: "Hanzai no Wasuregatami (Zenpen)" (Japanese: 犯罪の忘れ形見（前編）)	Mashu Ito	N/A	February 18, 2002
Hideo Morita has come forth to the agency asking Kogoro to find his late wife Mrs. Morita's watch which he has lost in his house. Kogoro refuses the problem, but the Detective Boys and Dr. Agasa offer to help. At Hideo's house, they find a room full of movie tapes and fantastic equipments for watching movies. During the search, Eiko Idetsuki, Hideo's neighbor, comes to ask for money he previously loaned. Hideo makes a partial payment then shows her the tape of a movie she really wanted to watch, and she goes to the audio room. The children give the woman lunch and find the watch in the washing machine. Just then, they hear a loud noise and find Idetsuki with her skull crushed by a vase of flowers followed by the sound of someone running out the door. Hideo has an alibi as he wasn't in the same room as the victim but Conan believes that Hideo played a role in Idetsuki's untimely demise. During the investigation, Takagi reveals to Conan that someone has stolen from the police all the documents relating to cases resolved by Kogoro. These documents, however, were returned by mail shortly thereafter. Moreover, Takagi adds that the thief struck the same day of the questioning of witnesses of the hijacked bus incident. Conan immediately suspects Professor Jodie, Dr. Araide and a mysterious man named Shuichi Akai.
270	16	"The Forgotten Memento from the Crime (Part 2)"; Transliteration: "Hanzai no Wasuregatami (Kōhen)" (Japanese: 犯罪の忘れ形見（後編）)	Izumi Shimura	N/A	March 4, 2002
Conan does not think that Idetsuki was attacked by an outsider. The kids detect the scent of flowers coming from the microwave and Conan gets how the crime was committed. Using Agasa's voice, Conan declares that Hideo murdered Idetsuki, having programmed the remote control to work for two VCR machines, one of which was hidden behind curtains above her with a vase in front of it. When Idetsuki finished the movie, she used the remote to eject the tape out and crouched below to retrieve it. This causes the tape in the top VCR to come out as well which pushes the vase over and crushes Idetsuki's skull. As evidence, Hideo removed the vase in the hallway which was separated in to two parts in advance and hid them in the cupboard among the dishes and tableware. The flowers were heated in the microwave and thrown in the trash can. Idetsuki persuaded Mrs. Morita to invest in the stock market which later built up massive debt, and she committed suicide. After solving the case, Conan rushes home, fearing Ran and Kogoro are kidnapped. He discovers that his suspicions were unfounded and that Ran is fine, but doesn't realize that someone is really watching the agency: Shuichi Akai.
271	17	"The Secret Rushed Omission (Part 1)"; Transliteration: "Kakushite Isoide Shouryaku (Zenpen)" (Japanese: 隠して急いで省略（前編）)	Johei Matsura	N/A	March 11, 2002
Ran, feeling she met the mysterious man before, attempts to remember why. Jodie interrupts the daydreaming Ran in class and asks her the meaning of X to which she is unable to answer correctly. On the way home, they meet Jodie who takes them to the cafe in a department store to warn them about a serial groper. Conan notices a business man named Norihisa Kisugi making a suspicious phone call to a private detective named Katsunori Chuujou. Chuujou demands Kisugi to pay four times the promised amount or he will not hand over the investigation documents concerning an unknown individual. Kisugi agrees and enters the department store only to be killed by the individual. A coincidental blackout occurs at the same time, and when the power returns, Kisugi is found dead on the top of an escalator with ○×△ written on an envelope. The police understands the message to be a dying message, and using Chuujou's phone, allows them to locate the last caller, Kisugi. Kisugi reveals that he hired the detective to search for an embezzler in the company. The documented that contained the embezzler's identity is missing from Chuujou's envelope and the police discern the embezzler must be the culprit. Kisugi then hands them Chuujou's list of fifty-eight suspects he had received. The police decrease the suspects down to thirty-one after investigating the alibis of the suspects. Conan tells the police a line of blood is found on the edge of the envelope and explains part of Chuujou's dying message must be on the escalator. Using a luminol reaction, they discover □ revealing the whole message to be □○×△; Conan notes the square is much bigger than the other three symbol.
272	18	"The Secret Rushed Omission (Part 2)"; Transliteration: "Kakushite Isoide Shouryaku (Kōhen)" (Japanese: 隠して急いで省略（後編）)	Minoru Tozawa	N/A	March 18, 2002
Conan's investigation leads him to discover the meaning of the symbols. He drops hints for Joseph Meguire to deduce what the symbols are. Meguire explains that the symbols are outlines for kanji and □ is bigger than the other three symbols since it was not cut off. He elaborates further, explaining the three symbols are missing the top portion since they were written past the envelope and onto the document. The culprit is revealed to be Bunta Kuniyoshi (国吉文太, Kuniyoshi Bunta), correcting that the bottom of 吉 is usually more round. The police interrogate Kuniyoshi and convict him for the murder after Takagi gathers the shredded pieces of the documents with blood and piece them together forming the missing top portion of ○×△ and fully spelling Kuniyoshi's name. Kuniyoshi confesses explaining he wanted a better life for his poor family. Ran, learning the meaning of X, sends a mail to Shinichi with Xs. Elsewhere, an unknown Black Organization member sends a message to Gin with X's in her message explaining they are a sign of feminine affection but can also be a sign of hate before throwing a dart at a picture of Shiho with an X through it.
273	19	"Old Lady's Quiz Disappearance Case"; Transliteration: "Kuizu-baasan no Shissou Jiken" (Japanese: クイズ婆さんの失踪事件)	Mashu Ito	Takeo Ohno	April 8, 2002
The Detective Boys meet an old woman in the park who feeds and takes care of stray cats, and also likes to give the kids quizzes from a puzzle book she has. The next day she doesn't show up to feed the cats, but the cat Bruce comes with the old lady's scarf around his neck. The scarf has a code and blood on it, and to find and save the lady Conan and the gang must solve the puzzle.
274	20	"The Truth About the Haunted House (Part 1)"; Transliteration: "Yuurei-yashiki no Shinjitsu (Zenpen)" (Japanese: 幽霊屋敷の真実（前編）)	Toru Kitahata	N/A	April 15, 2002
Ran catches a cold and visits the doctor. When there one of the doctor's patients mentions that his apartment is haunted by a girl who was burned to death four years ago. Conan and Kogoro decide to investigate. Once there they meet three other people who are living in that apartment. Ran who is fearful of ghost tells her father they should leave at 7 pm. When the clock strikes 10:20 pm, Ran wakes up to find a ghost in the television telling her to leave. Kogoro and Conan wake up due to her screaming. Kogoro tells Ran it was probably a dream and goes to the toilet. After he's done the water turns red. Kogoro backs away from the toilet and screams when he sees a ghostly image.
275	21	"The Truth About the Haunted House (Part 2)"; Transliteration: "Yuurei-yashiki no Shinjitsu (Kōhen)" (Japanese: 幽霊屋敷の真実（後編）)	Mashu Ito	N/A	April 22, 2002
The three people excluding the old man are given more back story. One man does not believe in the ghost, one man is a horror movie filmer, and the other man just lives there. They are told that two suspects of the burning four years ago ran from the scene and one of them was identified. Conan finds out how the ghost trick was done. He puts Kogoro to sleep and tells them the reason those tricks were done. He reveals that the culprit is one of the two suspects and that he is hiding the other suspect too.
276	22	"The Policeman's Missing Notebook Case"; Transliteration: "Keisatsu Techou Funshitsu Jiken" (Japanese: 警察手帳紛失事件)	Johei Matsura	Nobuo Ogizawa	May 6, 2002
Takagi loses his badge after breaking up a fight between a manager and his singer. He searches for it with the help of the Detective Boys. They then discover that the singer plans to murder his manager. The Detective Boys manage to bring Takagi to his apartment and save him before he is killed. The manager picked up Takagi's badge.
277	23	"English Teacher vs. Great Detective of the West (Part 1)"; Transliteration: "Eigo-kyoushi tai Nishi no Meitantei (Zenpen)" (Japanese: 英語教師VS西の名探偵（前編）)	Minoru Tozawa	N/A	May 13, 2002
While at the Professor's, Conan recalls his last meeting with the Black Organization. Conan deduces that another Black Organization member must have been at the hotel party. This is when he finally singles out Chris Vineyard as his suspect. Heiji came to Tokyo to help Conan out with the case. Heiji suspects Jodie-sensei of being a possible Black Organization member, and although Conan seems reluctant to this idea, they pay Jodie-sensei a visit at her apartment. They find out here that her full name is "Jodie Saintemillion". After Jodie agrees to go out for a while with Heiji and Conan, the man living next door to Jodie falls dead outside from over 30 stories, coincidentally as the three are outside. After the police arrive, it seems likely that the man committed suicide. However, Conan and Heiji have a different idea.
278	24	"English Teacher vs. Great Detective of the West (Part 2)"; Transliteration: "Eigo-kyoushi tai Nishi no Meitantei (Kōhen)" (Japanese: 英語教師VS西の名探偵（後編）)	Yoshio Suzuki	N/A	May 20, 2002
Heiji immediately destroys the theory of suicide, by showing that the man who fell from his apartment attempted to grab onto the curtain to save his life. Searched the Crime Scene, Conan and Heiji reveal the truth by showing how the room was switched around. Discussing of Jodie's identification with Jodie herself, Heiji indicates that he noticed the odd habit of Jodie. When Conan and Heiji leave, they concur that Jodie is someone suspicious, but believe that she is innocuous.
279	25	"Hooligan in the Labyrinth (Part 1)"; Transliteration: "Meikyuu no Fuurigan (Zenpen)" (Japanese: 迷宮のフーリガン（前編）)	Toru Kitahata	N/A	May 27, 2002
The Detective Boys and Agasa go and watch a soccer game of the Tokyo Spirits vs. Noir Tokyo. On the way back they see a very rude and loud supporter who has gotten kicked out of many stadiums for his crazy behavior. They all get on a train to go home, but as they are exiting to change trains they see the rude supporter fall on the floor with a knife in his stomach. The train was packed so it could have been anybody and no one saw the crime happen, but Conan is able to reduce the suspects down to 3 soccer supporters.
280	26	"Hooligan in the Labyrinth (Part 2)"; Transliteration: "Meikyuu no Fuurigan (Kōhen)" (Japanese: 迷宮のフーリガン（後編）)	Mashu Ito	N/A	June 3, 2002
After questioning the 3 suspects Conan still cannot determine who is the culprit, but notices that Haibara is watching the next soccer match on the subway's TV. She empathizes with the player Higo, who has changed from playing for Noir Tokyo to the Tokyo Spirits, but is now hated by both teams. Conan realizes a vital piece of evidence will be on the culprit, and determines that the culprit is the man who is a fake supporter of Noir Tokyo because he has the imprint of the knife on his arm where he was hiding it. Conan goes over to Haibara and tells her that now Higo has scored a goal, his new team is cheering for him. Haibara promises never to run away from fate, and Conan promises to protect her.
281	27	"The Small Eye-Witnesses"; Transliteration: "Chiisana Mokugekisha-tachi" (Japanese: 小さな目撃者たち)	Johei Matsura	Michiru Shimada	June 10, 2002
The 3 Detective Boys are playing 'make-believe detectives' when they encounter a real case. A man is killed right in front of them, wrapped up in a sheet and thrown into a truck. The Detective Boys hide in the back of the truck with the body and the killer drives to a forest and buries the body. The next day the Detective Boys tell Conan and Kogoro about the murder, and Conan is able to tell where the body was buried from the descriptions of what the truck drove past and the culprit is caught.
282	28	"The Mystery of the Water Flowing Stone Garden (Part 1)"; Transliteration: "Mizu Nagaruru Sekitei no Kai (Zenpen)" (Japanese: 水流るる石庭の怪（前編）)	Minoru Tozawa	Yoshifumi Fukushima	June 17, 2002
Kogoro, Conan, and Ran are driving in the mountains when they run out of gas and are kindly picked up by Majima, the president of a furniture company. Most of the people that work for him and live with him seem to hate him, so it isn't a surprise when Majima turns up dead the next morning in the beautiful house rock garden. The mystery is that there is not a single foot print around the body.
283	29	"The Mystery of the Water Flowing Stone Garden (Part 2)"; Transliteration: "Mizu Nagaruru Sekitei no Kai (Kōhen)" (Japanese: 水流るる石庭の怪（後編）)	Shintaro Itoga	Yoshifumi Fukushima	June 24, 2002
Kogoro accuses one of Majima's employees who was in debt, but is quickly proven wrong. He then accuses Endou, one of Majima's company managers. The police find a threatening note in the trash from Endou to Majima saying to meet on the roof which seems to implicate Endou further. Kogoro says that if Endou tied a rope around the body and used a bow and arrows, it would have been possible to lower the body without a trace. The police go to look for evidence of the arrows and rope, and Conan is shocked when they actually find it because the position the body is in makes it impossible for that trick to have been used. Conan deduces that the culprit is Kiyama-san whose father was murdered by Majima. Kiyama flooded the garden with water and floated the body on an air mat to leave no trace behind. Note: This is the last episode to use hand-drawn cel animation.
284	30	"Chinatown Deja Vu in the Rain (Part 1)"; Transliteration: "Chuukagai Ame no Deja Byu (Zenpen)" (Japanese: 中華街 雨のデジャビュ（前編）)	Mashu Ito	N/A	July 1, 2002
Arguing with receptionist for free dinner ticket, one of movie director's crew invited Ran and her crews. However, the director man dies at a restaurant by cyanide but they are unable to find the source poison. Meanwhile Ran is moody because of a developing fever, and a memory of Shinichi and a pale man in a wool cap floats at the edge of her mind. Note: This is the first episode to use digital ink and paint animation.
285	31	"Chinatown Deja Vu in the Rain (Part 2)"; Transliteration: "Chuukagai Ame no Deja Byu (Kōhen)" (Japanese: 中華街 雨のデジャビュ（後編）)	Hideki Hiroshima	N/A	July 8, 2002
After the case is solved, Ran falls ill. To everyone's surprise, she falls from her chair and collapses on the floor, having memories of certain people she met a long time ago. These people include Sharon Vineyard and the mysterious man.

== Notes ==
- ^2 hrs. Two hour long special episode.
