= With a Bang (Case Closed) =

Episode arc in Detective Conan

The 36th tankōbon of Case Closed released by Viz Media on October 12, 2010 where the majority of the individual chapters of the arc is encapsulated. Tokyo Tower appears in the background and is an important setting in the story arc.

With a Bang, entitled as Yureru Keishichō: Sennihyakumannin no Hitojichi (揺れる警視庁 1200万人の人質, lit. "The Trembling Metropolitan Police Headquarter and 12 Million Hostages") in its original Japanese publication, is the 107th story arc of the Japanese manga series Case Closed, which is referred to as Meitantei Konan (名探偵コナン, lit. Great Detective Conan, officially translated as Detective Conan) in Japan. The arc follows Conan Edogawa as he works with the Tokyo Metropolitan Police Department to catch a bomber.

The arc spanned 6 chapters which were published in Shogakukan's Weekly Shōnen Sunday magazine. They were later encapsulated into tankōbon volumes 36 and 37 which were released in Japan on February 18, 2002, and April 18, 2002, respectively. The arc was later adapted into the anime series as episode 304 which was broadcast by Nippon Television Network System on January 6, 2003.

Viz Media localized and published the two volumes on October 12, 2010, and January 11, 2011. Volume 36 appeared on the New York Times Manga Best Sellers list during the week ending on October 24, 2010.

== Plot ==
A bomber, who has targeted the Tokyo Metropolitan Police Department in the past, reappears after a three year remission. After critically wounding officer Ninzaburo Santos in an explosion, the bomber faxes a challenge to the Metropolitan Police in a form of a riddle declaring he had hidden a bomb in the city. The fax reads "I'm a fast pitcher and hard hitting major leaguer. The extra innings have began. The game begins at noon and ends at 3 pm. Even if you prepare a good stopper, it won't help, I will turn it around in the end. If you want to end this game, come find me. When the police climb the blood-stained mound, I will be waiting in the steel batter's box." Officers Wataru Takagi and Miwako Sato set out to solve the riddle while being accompanied by Conan and the Junior Detective League.

Initially, they fall for a red herring believing "extra innings" is a play on words in Japanese for "extending lines" and head for the location where the two places the bomber struck coincided. Eventually, Conan realizes the blood-stained mound refers to Tokyo Tower and the batter's box to be an elevator. Conan and Takagi enter the tower to save a girl trapped in an elevator and are subsequently caught by the bomber's trap. Conan finds the bomb on top of the elevator they are in set to detonate at noon and prepares to disarm it. He soon realizes the bomb will reveal a hint to the location of an even larger bomb during the last three seconds till detonation. Conan and Takagi decide to forfeit their lives in order to send the hint to Sato. Conan disarms the bomb at the final second acquiring a part of the hint which were the letters "EVIT". He explains Takagi his deductions on the location of the other bomb which is set to detonate at 3 pm.

The bomber is cornered by the police after performing a wide area search around Teitan High School. They reveal the riddle and hint gave all the information needed to discern the location of the second bomb. Inspector Joseph Meguire reveals "major league" in the riddle means the riddle should be viewed from an English point of view, due to the fact the major league is not a Japanese term. When viewed in English, extra innings is abbreviated as "EXTRA' while a stopper refers to the earned run average, abbreviated as "ERA". When "ERA" is removed from "EXTRA", "XT" remains and when flipped around, as referred to in the riddle, becomes the kanji 文 which is the symbol for school in the Japanese map. As for the hint, "EVIT" is the incomplete word for "DETECTIVE" in reverse. When the kanji for Detective, Tantei (探偵), is flipped, it becomes Teitan (偵探) allowing them to deduce Teitan Highschool.

The bomber attempts to flee and is cornered by Sato. Sato prepares to avenge her partner, Jinpei Matsuda (松田 陣平), who was killed by the bomber three years prior but is stopped by Takagi. After confiding in Takagi over the death of Matsuda and the satisfaction that the bomber was captured, she is able to lay her memories of Matsuda to rest and move onwards with her life.

== Anime adaption ==
The With a Bang story arc was aired on the Case Closed anime series as episode 304 which was broadcast by Nippon Television Network System on January 6, 2003. The opening theme music was "I can't stop my love for you♥" by Rina Aiuchi and the ending theme is "Overture" by Koshi Inaba. The episode was directed by Kōjin Ochi (越智浩仁), Mashu Itō (伊藤真朱), and Masato Sato (佐藤真人); Masato Sato also produced the episode. The animation were directed by Mashu Itō and Atsushi Aono (青野厚司) who were assisted by Mari Tominaga (とみながまり). The episode was released in the fifth DVD volume of season 11.

== Reception ==
Reception for the story arc had been positive. The arc was ranked as the number one fan favorite determined by a poll on Weekly Shōnen Sunday in 2011. Gosho Aoyama, the creator of the Case Closed series, also considered the arc to be his favorite storyline. Viz Media localized volume 36, where the majority of the arc is encapsulated, which appeared on New York Times Manga Best Sellers list during the week ending on October 24, 2010. ComicBookBin.com's Leroy Douresseaux praised how With a Bang broke the whodunit norm and compared the plot to a Hollywood action-thriller film.
