= Case Closed season 11 =

Season of television series

Case Closed
- Season 11
- The cover of the first DVD compilation for season eleven of Detective Conan released by Shogakukan
- No. of episodes: 30

Release
- Original network: NNS (ytv)
- Original release: July 15, 2002 – April 14, 2003

Season chronology
- ← Previous; Season 10 Next → Season 12

The eleventh season of the Case Closed anime was directed by Yasuichiro Yamamoto and produced by TMS Entertainment and Yomiuri Telecasting Corporation. The series is based on Gosho Aoyama's Case Closed manga series. In Japan, the series is titled Detective Conan (名探偵コナン, Meitantei Conan) but was changed due to legal issues with the title Detective Conan. The episodes' plot follows Conan Edogawa's daily adventures.

The episodes use six pieces of theme music: two opening themes and four ending themes. The first opening theme is "I can't stop my love for you♥" by Rina Aiuchi until episode 305. The second opening is "Kaze no Rarara" (風のららら, lit. "Wind of Lalala") by Mai Kuraki for the rest of the season. The first ending theme is "Yumemita Ato de" (夢みたあとで, lit. "After I Dream") until episode 287. The second ending theme is "Mushoku" (無色, lit. "Colourless") by Azumi Uehara until episode 299. The third ending theme is "Overture" by Koshi Inaba until episode 306. The fourth ending theme is "Ashita wo Yume Mite" (明日を夢見て, lit. "Dreaming of tomorrow") by Zard for the rest of the season.

The season initially ran from July 15, 2002, through April 14, 2003, on Nippon Television Network System in Japan. Episodes 286 to 315 were later collected into eight DVD compilations by Shogakukan. They were released between March 25, 2005, and June 24, 2005, in Japan.

Episodes 286 to 288 were dubbed by Studio Nano as part of a curated episode list, which was released on Crunchyroll and Netflix on August 21, 2025. Episodes 307 and 308 were later dubbed and released on May 1, 2026.

== Episode list ==
No.	No. in season	Title	Directed by	Written by	Original air date
286	1	"Shinichi Kudo in New York (The Case)"; Transliteration: "Kudō Shinichi NY no Jiken (Jikenhen)" (Japanese: 工藤新一NYの事件（事件編）)	Nana Harada	N/A	July 15, 2002
Ran loses consciousness due to her illness and reminisces about her past with Shinichi in New York. Shinichi's mother, Yukiko Kudo, takes the two to view The Golden Apple musical at Broadway. When they arrive, they are introduced to a famous actress named Sharon Vineyard, and the five performers that will be performing the musical. They learn from them that an unknown culprit had sent the performers a Golden Apple with the words "For the Fairest" written on it and presume it is a threat. While touring the theater, a medieval suit of armour is sent flying towards the group. An actress is about to be hit with the armour until Ran pushes her out of the way.
287	2	"Shinichi Kudo in New York (The Deduction)"; Transliteration: "Kudō Shinichi NY no Jiken (Suirihen)" (Japanese: 工藤新一NYの事件（推理編）)	Johei Matsuura	N/A	July 22, 2002
The performance of The Golden Apple begins. During the climax of the musical, the actor Heath Flockhart, who is portraying Paris, is shot. The police arrive and come to the conclusion an unknown assailant rented out all the terraces in the theater and that they shot Heath from there. Shinichi reveals that he found a bullet in one of the terraces shortly after the murder but it was cold, meaning it was set up to create the idea an audience murdered Heath. He also reveals that the falling suit of armour from before was set up by a tripwire deduces that the murderer is one of the four actresses, who all have shared a romantic relationship with Heath. While Shinichi investigates to find out how the murder was done, he notices a crack in the mirror prop and realizes who the murderer is.
288	3	"Shinichi Kudo in New York (The Resolution)"; Transliteration: "Kudō Shinichi NY no Jiken (Kaiketsuhen)" (Japanese: 工藤新一NYの事件（解決編）)	Minoru Tozawa	N/A	July 29, 2002
Shinichi tells his mother his deductions on the case to have her solve the murder. It is revealed that since the mirror was damaged, the employees of the theater fixed the mirror, causing it to become shorter. Since the mirror was too low to conceal Heath during the musical, they decided to add a revolving trap door on the stage. It is then revealed that besides Heath, the actress Rose Hewitt was informed of the trap door as it is her job to close the trap door when Heath is carried by wires out of it. Yukiko declares Rose to be the murderer, revealing that during the time the stage was covered in the fog, Rose shot Heath through an opening between the mirror and the floor as he was rising out of the trap door. Rose then placed the gun on Heath to create the suspicion the true suspect threw the gun on stage from the terrace. As evidence, Shinichi reveals Heath grabbed onto Rose with his blood-soaked hands which was found on the inside of her glove. Shinichi and Ran take a taxi to the hotel but stop in an alleyway when Ran's handkerchief flies out the window and onto a fire escape. Shinichi leaves to retrieve it and Ran meets a mysterious FBI agent who orders her to leave as the serial killer they are searching for is nearby. Ran searches for Shinichi and finds the serial killer on the fire escape. The man prepares to shoot Ran but when the fire escape railing gives way, he loses his balance but is saved by Ran and Shinichi. Ran collapses from her illness and Shinichi leaves with her declaring to the man he will capture him the next time they meet. The next day, Yukiko receives a call of Sharon who asks her to tell Ran an angel is watching over her also. Ran awakens from her illness in the present time and phones Shinichi to talk about their time in New York. Shinichi reveals that the serial killer was found murdered by the police shortly after their encounter.
289	4	"Mitsuhiko in a Forest of Indecision (Part 1)"; Transliteration: "Mayoi no Mori no Mitsuhiko (Zenpen)" (Japanese: 迷いの森の光彦（前編）)	Mashu Ito	N/A	August 5, 2002
Mitsuhiko is missing during the radio taiso day. The Detective Boys ask about his whereabouts from Mitsuhiko's sister and learn he had been going out to an unknown location for the past few Sundays. His sister tells them Mitsuhiko had packed a few Onigiris, and sunscreen. She also tells them Mitsuhiko has been meeting with a girl. The Detective Boys learn from the girl that Mitsuhiko boarded a bus a few hours ago and had an odd smell of lemons. Asking the bus driver, they learn Mitsuhiko boarded the bus and get off at the train station. Asking the ticket administrator, they learn Mitsuhiko headed towards Mount Osutaka. Once at the mountain, Mitsuhiko's Detective badge is caught on Conan's radar and they follow the location and end up at a forest. There, they find Misao Yamamura, who informs them they are chasing after a serial killer who took refuge in the same forest Mitsuhiko is currently in.
290	5	"Mitsuhiko in a Forest of Indecision (Part 2)"; Transliteration: "Mayoi no Mori no Mitsuhiko (Kōhen)" (Japanese: 迷いの森の光彦（後編）)	Hideki Hiroshima	N/A	August 12, 2002
Conan's radar runs out of power forcing the group to search for Mitsuhiko in the forest. While they try to figure out Mitsuhiko's objective in the forest, Conan reveals that the reason Mitsuhiko smelled like lemons was because the sun screen contained Cymbopogon, a plant used as insect repellent. The group runs into the serial killer, Kiichiro Numabchi, who escapes when he is noticed. Haibara reveals that Kiichiro was part of the Black Organization and was subjected as a test subject for the APTX 4869 but flees before they could do so. They soon find Mitsuhiko with Kiichiro who is later arrested by the police. Conan reveals that Mitsuhiko's objective was to find a firefly and trap it with the bamboo leaves from the Onigiri in order to impress Ayumi and Haibara. The next day at school, Ayumi and Haibara talk about the Tsuchinoko was seemingly was spotted in Gifu. Overhearing this, Genta and Mitsuhiko plan a trip to Gifu to search for the Tsuchinoko.
291	6	"Solitary Island of the Princess and the Dragon King's Palace (The Murder)"; Transliteration: "Kotō no Hime to Ryugujo (Jikenhen)" (Japanese: 孤島の姫と龍宮城（事件編）)	Shintaro Itoga	N/A	August 19, 2002
Heiji and Kogoro are invited to Okinawa to solve the case of a body that was found on Onikame (鬼亀, lit. Demon Turtle) island alongside a mysterious carved message by the body. The deduction battle between the two shall be televised in order to boast the declining tourism of Okinawa. Heiji, Conan, Ran, and Kazuha head to the island to investigate and are accompanied by four TV station employees. They find the mysterious message as "The sleeping place of a princess shall be Kō and not Otu" where Kō and Otu could stand for multiple meanings. When Yoshie Taira is found strangled, the dying message "I am a Servitor of Goosoh", Heiji realizes she must have found something and dives into the water only to find an anchor. When they prepare to head back, they find out the captain left with the boat, stranding them on the Onikame. They decide to wait in an abandoned house until a rescue boat arrives.
292	7	"Solitary Island of the Princess and the Dragon King's Palace (The Investigation)"; Transliteration: "Kotō no Hime to Ryugujo (Tsuikyūhen)" (Japanese: 孤島の姫と龍宮城（追求編）)	Mashu Ito	N/A	August 26, 2002
Heiji tells them the Anchor he found was approximately four to five years old, the same time period on which the strange events have been occurring on Onikame. It began with the mayor's daughter, Miyako Kenshiro, who was kidnapped and a year after that, burglars broke into the mayor's house stealing his byōbu and murdering a maid. They decide to search the house in case the culprit was hiding in one of the rooms and come upon evidence that Miyako lived in the house when she was young. After finding the house secure, they await for a boat. In the middle of the night, a boat crashes onto the pier. They investigate and find out it was their boat from before and that the captain was beaten to death. They find out the boat was set on autopilot and realize that the culprit of the murders is actually one of the four TV staff members with them.
293	8	"Solitary Island of the Princess and the Dragon King's Palace (The Resolution)"; Transliteration: "Kotō no Hime to Ryugujo (Kaiketsuhen)" (Japanese: 孤島の姫と龍宮城（解決編）)	Johei Matsuura	N/A	September 2, 2002
When Conan and Heiji find the name "Kaa" and "Chi" written by Miyako many years ago, they realize who the names are referring to. Conan and Heiji have an epiphany and realize the culprit faked Tiara's time of death. Heiji then calls Yoshitsuga Kume, one of the staff members, so they could privately. Later Kume escapes and everyone splits up and searches for him on the island. Elsewhere, the culprit attempts to strangle Kume, but it is revealed to be Heiji wearing Kume's clothes. He reveals the culprit to be Daito Mikihiko. Heiji reveals that Taira actually died much later. He reveals that the message written in sand was actually in a place the waves never reached. He reveals that the water, creating the idea that the message would be washed away when the tides raised, was from the boat which was searching around the island. Heiji reveals the man who was found dead on the island was part of the robber who invaded the Mayor's house and the dying message refers to the treasure and Kō and Otsu refer to the folklore Urashima Tarō where Kō stands for the turtle while Otu stands for princess. The princess the inscription refers to is the stolen byōbu. Heiji also reveals Tiara was actually Miyako Kenshiro in disguise. Daito confesses to the murder revealing that the maid the robbers murdered was his fiance. Daito also revealed that Miyako was testing her father's love for her who was revealed to be her step-father, and when she faked the kidnapping and her father refused to pay the ransom, stole the byōbu in vengeance.
294	9	"Smash of Love and Determination (Part 1)"; Transliteration: "Ai to Ketsudan no Sumasshu (Zenpen)" (Japanese: 愛と決断のスマッシュ（前編）)	Minoru Tozawa	Junichi Miyashita	September 9, 2002
The Detective Boys along with Kogoro, Ran, and Sonoko take a trip to Kumamoto, Kumamoto so the Detective Boys may participate in a Tennis Tournament. Ran and Sonoko explore the city and finds a cell phone on the floor. When Sonoko picks up the phone, an unknown person sends her a message declaring their love for her and leaves a location and time so they may meet. Ran and Sonoko allocate to the meeting place. While Sonoko is in the bathroom, Ran overhears three men planning to murder someone. To hide their conversation, the men kidnap Ran. Ran awakens in a locker room with her hands tied and using the phone, manages to contact Conan. She tells him her current situation and describes her surroundings. The three men return and destroys the phone Ran was using. The Detective Boys along with Kogoro and Sonoko report the kidnapping to the authorities while Conan wonders what the objective of the three men is.
295	10	"Smash of Love and Determination (Part 2)"; Transliteration: "Ai to Ketsudan no Sumasshu (Kōhen)" (Japanese: 愛と決断のスマッシュ（後編）)	Yoshio Suzuki	Junichi Miyashita	September 16, 2002
The police department receive a ransom demanding a large sum for Ran's life. The police send their men to search around town for Ran. Conan and Haibara soon deduce from Ran's description of her location. Once there, the Detective Boys are able to save Ran and apprehend the two kidnappers. However, it is revealed the third kidnapper is planning to murder the announcer for a Tennis match. Conan informs the police and they are able to persuade the murderer to surrender peacefully.
296	11	"Houseboat Fishing Shock"; Transliteration: "Yakatabune Tsuri Shokku" (Japanese: 屋形船 釣りショック)	Hideki Hiroshima	Masaaki Sakurai Masataka Tsukimawashi	October 14, 2002
Kazuyuki Kawai invites Kogoro, Ran, and Conan to his houseboat for dinner and to view the fireworks. During the fireworks, Kawai's guest, Tsuneo Yamasaki, is found dead from electrocution. Kogoro deduces that Tsuneo slipped on some water causing his fishing rod to touch exposed electrical wiring causing his death. Conan investigates and realizes it Is a murder. After tranquilizing Kogoro, Conan using his voice changing bowtie, reveals the murderer to be Kawai. He reveals that Kawai set up the fishing rod so it would be caught at the bow of the boat. When the fishing rod is in place, Kawai asks Yamasaki for help to pull the fishing rod loose. As Yamasaki tries to reel in the hook, Kawai pushes Yamasaki causing the fishing line to cut due to a positioned razor blade and caused Yamasaki to fall backwards with the fishing rod which touches the exposed wiring. As evidence, Conan reveals that rubber should be found in Kawai's lighter as he used it to melt the rubber off the wires to set up the murder.
297	12	"Courtroom Confrontation II: Kisaki vs. Kujo (Part 1)"; Transliteration: "Houtei no Taiketsu II: Kisaki tai Kujou (Zenpen)" (Japanese: 法廷の対決II 妃VS九条（前編）)	Shintaro Itoga	Yutaka Kaneko	October 21, 2002
Kisaki found herself defending a burglar being charged by the state prosecutor with murder instead of manslaughter. The burglar had been caught in the act in the inner office of a company by the proprietor. He managed to flee after a struggle where he knocked out his opponent with an ashtray. The proprietor had been discovered dead by his son-in-law and the building superintendent, who witnessed from the eyehole of the inner office door the taking place. The superintendent went to call the police while the son-in-law knocked the door open. According to the charges, the suspect forced the victim to open the safe, where a large sum of cash was discovered missing, and subsequently fled through the window. The suspect admitted the burglary attempt, hitting the victim, but denied stealing the money. During the first hearing, Kisaki discovered the reason why the prosecution pressed for the murder charge - the victim had once cheated the daughter of the suspect. Ran persuaded Kogoro to investigate to help Kisaki defend the suspect.
298	13	"Courtroom Confrontation II: Kisaki vs. Kujo (Part 2)"; Transliteration: "Houtei no Taiketsu II: Kisaki tai Kujou (Kōhen)" (Japanese: 法廷の対決II 妃VS九条（後編）)	Mashu Ito	Yutaka Kaneko	October 28, 2002
Conan went along with Kogoro during the investigation. He helped Kisaki and Kogoro realise that the superintendent only saw the shadow image of an assault. Conan also had to help Kogoro in the courtroom to reveal the truth of the death.
299	14	"The Kanmon Strait of Friendship and Murderous Intent (Part 1)"; Transliteration: "Yuujou to Satsui no Kanmon Kaikyou (Zenpen)" (Japanese: 友情と殺意の関門海峡（前編）)	Johei Matsura	Nobuo Ogizawa	November 4, 2002
Kogoro has won another contest and so he, Conan and Ran go on vacation, where four friends recognize him as the famous detective Kogoro Mouri. He has dinner with them, which is interrupted by a rude man trying to buy one of the friends' businesses, but they refuse to sell. It is then revealed that 13 years ago that man caused their fifth friend to commit suicide.
300	15	"The Kanmon Strait of Friendship and Murderous Intent (Part 2)"; Transliteration: "Yuujou to Satsui no Kanmon Kaikyou (Kōhen)" (Japanese: 友情と殺意の関門海峡（後編）)	Minoru Tozawa	Nobuo Ogizawa	November 18, 2002
The rude man is found dead, hit on the head with a rock. Kogoro immediately suspects the four friends who all had motives, but when he questions them they all have alibis. One of the women snaps though and admits to killing him, but Conan reveals with his deductions that she only knocked him out. It was the man with the business who killed him.
301	16	"Parade of Malice and Saints (Part 1)"; Transliteration: "Akui to Seija no Koushin (Zenpen)" (Japanese: 悪意と聖者の行進（前編）)	Shintaro Itoga	N/A	November 25, 2002
Agasa takes the Detective Boys to watch a parade. They run into Sato, who explains that they received a bomb threat and believe it is related to a bomb case three years ago. Takagi's disguise causes Sato to experience traumatic flashbacks and she resultantly slaps Takagi. The other officers reveal Takagi's disguise resembles Sato's dead partner, Matsuda. During the parade, the bomber detonates an explosive hidden under Takagi's car; Takagi luckily was able to avoid the explosion.
302	17	"Parade of Malice and Saints (Part 2)"; Transliteration: "Akui to Seija no Koushin (Kōhen)" (Japanese: 悪意と聖者の行進（後編）)	Johei Matsura	N/A	December 2, 2002
After a thorough investigation, Conan realizes that the mail truck never arrived and realizes the explosion was a distraction and what the true motives for the bombers are. At a bank, a mail deliverer attempts to rob the bank only to be ambushed by the police. The police reveal that the bombers hijacked a mail truck while holding the mailmen hostages and had planned to rob the bank while the police were distracted. The bombers were then arrested and it was revealed they were not responsible for the bomb crime three years ago. Later that day, Sato breaks up with Takagi claiming that every man she ever loved died.
303	18	"The Victim Who Came Back"; Transliteration: "Modotte Kita Higaisha" (Japanese: 戻って来た被害者)	Hideki Hiroshima	Nobuo Ogizawa Masataka Tsukimawashi	December 9, 2002
While walking around town the Detective Boys hear a woman in an apartment scream. They investigate the source of the screaming and find a dead old woman stuffed inside of a Sofa. The police arrive and interrogate Sanae Hosono, the woman who found the body, and learn that she recently bought the sofa from a flower shop. While the police question the inhabitants of the apartment, The Detective Boys along with Takagi, interrogate the employees of the flower shop who bought in the sofa. They learn that the sofa was found on the curbside of the apartment. Mitsuhiko concludes that the culprit is Kazuhiro Tokunaga due to the instability of his alibi. Takagi confronts Tokunaga who confesses and reveals he murdered her in rage when she threatened to take everything away from him.
304	19	"Trembling Metropolitan Police Headquarters and 12 Million Hostages^{2 hrs.}" Transliteration: "Yureru Keishichou Sennihyakumannin no Hitojichi" (Japanese: 揺れる警視庁 1200万人の人質)	Masato Sato	N/A	January 6, 2003
Sato reminisces about the bomber case three years ago. Three years ago, a bomber sent a fax to the Tokyo Metropolitan Police containing the location of a bomb in the form of a riddle. Matsuda discovers the bombs location and realizes that the bomb contains a clue an even larger bomb and that the clue is only revealed during the last three seconds before detonation; Matsuda sacrifices his life and allowed the police to locate the second bomb. In the present time, the bomber returns and sends a fax to the Police station. The Detective Boys along with Takagi and Sato attempt to decrypt the riddle and locate the bomb. An explosion occurs at Tokyo Tower and a girl becomes stranded in an elevator. Takagi and Conan free her but become trapped in the elevator themselves due to a second explosion. Conan finds a bomb in the elevator and begins to disarm it until a message appears revealing that a clue to a second bomb will appear in the last three seconds before detonation. Conan deduces the code and disarms the bomb with one second remaining and reveals the code is refers to the English word "Detective" and when flipped around in its kanji form, says Teitan, the name of the school. The bomb at Teitan High is disarmed and the bomber is captured.
305	20	"The Unseen Suspect (Part 1)"; Transliteration: "Mienai Yougisha (Zenpen)" (Japanese: 見えない容疑者（前編）)	Hideki Hiroshima	N/A	January 13, 2003
Kogoro was invited to make an introduction in an episode of a popular detective TV serial. The star of the show revealed himself to be very disagreeable with the rest of the cast, one of whom, Ruri Amaki turned out to be a classmate of Kogoro when they were children. Ruri revealed to Ran and Conan who were present that she, Kogoro, and Kisaki, were classmates since kindergarten. Ran and Conan learned that the brainy Kisaki and the underachiever Kogoro seemed inexplicably drawn to each other, to quarrel. As the other classmates suspected, time showed that the arguments were intended to disguise their mutual attraction. The star challenged Kogoro to solve the mystery of the murder scene being filmed. To prevent Kogoro from embarrassing himself, Conan used the tranquilizer dart on Kogoro and cracked the puzzle with the clues present. During a break in the filming, the star was discovered with his throat slit, with Ruri over the body and her hands bloody.
306	21	"The Unseen Suspect (Part 2)"; Transliteration: "Mienai Yougisha (Kōhen)" (Japanese: 見えない容疑者（後編）)	Yoshio Suzuki	N/A	January 20, 2003
During a break in the filming, the star was discovered with his throat slit, with Ruri over the body and her hands bloody. No murder weapon could be found. The immediate suspects were members of the cast, including Ruri and the Nagumo father-son. While the police invetestigate, Conan gave little hint Kogoro to the murder revealing Ruri to the murderer. However, Kogoro reveals that Ruri is not the culprit but protects the one who killed the victim. After disclose of deduction, Ruri admits all the truth with deep sigh and prevailed the culprit to give up.
307	22	"The Remains of a Voiceless Testimony (Part 1)"; Transliteration: "Nokosareta Koenaki Shōgen (Zenpen)" (Japanese: 残された声なき証言（前編）)	Yoshio Suzuki	N/A	January 27, 2003
Three game designers arrive at Kogoro's agency to ask for his assistance to look for their game programmer Subaru Itakara. He was last heard in a video mail which shows him in a hotel with an igo, shogi, and chess set. One of the game producers believe that a mysterious man may be the cause of Itakara's disappearance; Conan realizes from his description the man is Tequila from the Black Organization. Kogoro decides to call hotels and ask them if anyone rented a shogi, chess, and igo set at once. After learning of Itakara's hotel and room number, they enter the apartment only to find out Itakara had died of a stroke. The police's investigation reveals that Itagara's body was tied up before his death; This means someone tied him up to prevent him from being able to take his medicine which would have prevented the stroke. Further investigation reveals that someone other than Kogoro also phoned the hotel asking for a person with a shogi, chess, and igo set; Since the three producers are the only ones who knew Itakara had those three sets and was staying in a hotel, this makes them the prime suspects for murder.
308	23	"The Remains of a Voiceless Testimony (part 2)"; Transliteration: "Nokosareta Koenaki Shōgen (Kōhen)" (Japanese: 残された声なき証言（後編）)	Izumi Shimura	N/A	February 3, 2003
The three designers are: Katsumichi Sugai, igo board game designer; Ryuusuke Souma, shogi board game designer; and Jouhei Naitou, a chess game designer. While the police investigate, Conan attempts to steal a floppy disk containing Itakara's diary so he could investigate the Black Organization but to no avail. A forensic officer reveals that the body is missing a sock impression on the right ankle, this causes Conan to realize who the murderer is. After tranquilizing Kogoro, Conan impersonates Kogoro and tricks Meguire into copying Itakara's diary onto another floppy disk. He then afterward reveals that Itakara, while tied up, used his feet and moved the pieces on the igo board to reveal who the murderer is. When the white pieces are ignored, the black pieces represent kanji characters in Braille and ultimately reveals that Souma is the culprit. As proof, Conan reveals that Itakara made the message on an igo board since Souma is unfamiliar with Braille and would not recognize the strange patterns on the igo board since he is not familiar with the game. As evidence, Conan reveals that there should be Itakara's fingerprints on Souma's watch. Souma confesses and reveals that he was angered that he invested twenty years worth of money and time into Itakara to build him a shogi program, yet had made no development throughout the years. Later that day, Conan and Ran are grocery shopping when they run into Shuichi Akai.
309	24	"Contact with the Black Organization: Negotiation Chapter"; Transliteration: "Kuro no Soshiki to no Sesshoku (Koushouhen)" (Japanese: 黒の組織との接触（交渉編）)	Johei Matsura	N/A	February 10, 2003
Ran tells Conan that Akai is an FBI agent causing Conan to wonder what the FBI are doing in Japan. Conan heads to Agasa to analyze the data from Itakara's disk and learn that the Black Organization were going to Itakara's cottage to retrieve the program he was working on. Conan and Agasa head to Itakara's cottage in an attempt to intercept the email that the Black Organization would send in order to trace them. However, the email was programmed to be deleted if the correct password was not typed and subsequently causes the Black Organization members to believe Itakara is in the cottage. Vodka phones the house and believing Itakara is in the cottage, to pick up the phone.
310	25	"Contact with the Black Organization: Pursuit Chapter"; Transliteration: "Kuro no Soshiki to no Sesshoku (Tsuisekihen)" (Japanese: 黒の組織との接触（追跡編）)	Hideki Hiroshima	N/A	February 17, 2003
Conan uses his voice changing bow tie to impersonate Itakara and is able to learn of the location and time of their planned meeting. As Conan and Agasa head to the disclosed location, a subway construction site in Gunma, their car breaks down. Luckily they are able to hitch hike with a man and woman. Conan notices that the man is unfamiliar with the car due to the steering wheel being in the left side instead of the usual right side as European cars; This causes him to begin suspecting the man and women to be hiding something. While passing a police check point, they learn that the jewelry robbers had abandoned their car in that area and may be near by.
311	26	"Contact with the Black Organization: Desperation Chapter"; Transliteration: "Kuro no Soshiki to no Sesshoku (Kesshihen)" (Japanese: 黒の組織との接触（決死編）)	Minoru Tozawa	N/A	February 24, 2003
Once arriving at their destination point, Conan reveals that the two people are the jewelry robber. Conan reveals that they hijacked a car as evidenced by the man's inability to handle the foreign car and how coins were found in the ashtray yet the man is a smoker. Conan apprehends the two culprits and proceeds to the subway. Once there Conan places the CD containing the program the Black Organization wants and places it in a coin locker with a sign on it. Vodka arrives and takes the CD but is stopped by Gin. Gin reveals that there is tape on the CD which means that someone was trying to get his fingerprint. Gin investigates the case and finds a tracker device. He places his hand on the case to find out its warm meaning the one who set up the disk is nearby. Conan manages to hide in a coin locker and passes out due to the lack of oxygen; He is found by Haibara the next day.
312	27	"Festival Dolls Dyed in the Setting Sun (Part 1)"; Transliteration: "Yuuhi ni Somatta Hinaningyou (Zenpen)" (Japanese: 夕陽に染まった雛人形（前編）)	Yoshio Suzuki	N/A	March 3, 2003
The Junior Detective Club accompanied Ayumi to an apartment where she was promised by the owners, to replace her own broken ningyō (traditional Japanese doll), a complete set of 7-tier Hinamatsuri dolls if she could correctly position the dolls. Conan surprised Ai by his knowledge of how the individual dolls were to be arranged, what was supposed to be a girl's hobby. Conan revealed he had been made to help Ran organizing the dolls when he was younger. After the dolls were correctly assembled, a neighbour came by and brought along a professional art connoisseur to verify the genuineness of an Edo era Raijin antique painting scroll hung openly in the apartment. The neighbour wanted persuade the owners to let him buy it to complement the Fūjin picture he already acquired. However, as it was an heirloom, the owners refused to sell. The connoisseur was upset at the lack of care in how the antique artwork was treated. Both left shortly, after the neighbour reminded the owners they were having financial difficulties. The children went on an errand to buy wine for the owners to make amazake as a treat for them. When they came back, they ran into the connoisseur who claimed he left his mobile behind. Reaching the apartment, they discovered nobody answered the door which was unlocked, and upon entry, discovered the apartment in a mess and the valuable painting had disappeared.
313	28	"Festival Dolls Dyed in the Setting Sun (Part 2)"; Transliteration: "Yuuhi ni Somatta Hinaningyou (Kōhen)" (Japanese: 夕陽に染まった雛人形（後編）)	Yoshio Suzuki	N/A	March 10, 2003
The police was called into what appears to be a break-in that occurred while all occupants happened to be out. However, Conan pointed out the clues which narrowed down the suspects to the neighbour who had been trying to purchase the painting without success, the art connoisseur, the old lady who lived in the apartment with her son and daughter-in-law, the son being absent from the story as he was at work the whole time. Conan also noticed that though the positions of the dolls had been disturbed, it reflected the traditional precedence was given to the left over the right, a custom which was only changed during the Meiji era. The more obvious suspects would be the old lady who originally came from Kyoto in Kansai region where many older traditions were still observed and the connoisseur who would have specialist knowledge of the subject.
314	29	"The Scenic Lookout with the Broken Fence"; Transliteration: "Kowareta Saku no Tenboudai" (Japanese: 壊れた柵の展望台)	Kazuyoshi Yokota	Hiro Masaki	March 17, 2003
Kogoro, Ran, and Conan are on a hiking trip. When they reach the observation deck, they witness a man jump off the edge to his death. The body was found at the bottom of the hill and is identified to be Takaya Hirai. Conan investigates the scene and realizes that it was a murder made to look like a suicide. Conan tranquilizes Kogoro and reveals the murderer to be Eeichirou Kondou, Hirais co-worker. Conan explains that Kondou was the one who they saw jump off the observation deck and reveals that when Kondou jumped, he landed on a tree below the cliff where he then proceeded to push the unconscious Hirai off the tree. As evidence Conan reveals that the tree had a mejiro's nest and that a piece of the nest was found on Hirai. To incriminate Kondou, Conan explains that Kondou's footprint from his mountaineering boots was found on the tree. Kondou confesses and reveals that Hirai was blackmailing him after he accidentally caused the death of a co-worker.
315	30	"Place Exposed to the Sun"; Transliteration: "Hi no Ataru Basho" (Japanese: 陽のあたる場所)	Hideki Hiroshima	Takeo Ohno	April 14, 2003
Jiroo Kuroki calls Kogoro to help his artist sensei, Shizusan Hayakawa's, depression due to the fact he is unable to draw anymore due to his age. During a fishing trip, Hayakawa's maid finds that he had hanged himself on bamboo. After at through investigation, Conan tranquilizes Kogoro to reveal that Kuroki murdered Haykawa. Conan reveals that he drugged Hayakawa with sleeping pills and bought him to the bamboo forest where he tied a noose around his sensei's neck. Kuroki then cut down the bamboo around the vicinity to allow the bamboo with the noose to gain more sunlight and grow exponentially, allowing it to hang his master. Kuroki confesses and reveals he wanted to sell the paintings he painted under his own name but his sensei refused it.

== Notes ==
- ^2 hrs. Two hour long special episode.
