= Rina Aiuchi discography =

- Studio albums: 9
- Compilation albums: 2
- Singles: 43
- Video albums: 13
- Remix albums: 2

Rina Aiuchi has released nine studio albums, four compilation albums, two remix albums, 43 singles and 13 video albums. In 2000, Aiuchi released her debut studio album, Be Happy. It has sold more than 306,000 copies nationwide and yielded four singles: "Close to Your Heart", "It's Crazy for You", "Ohh! Paradise Taste!!", and "Koi wa Thrill, Shock, Suspense". A year later, Aiuchi released her second studio album Power of Words, which has sold 420,000 copies nationwide and became her best-selling album. The record was promoted by five singles, "Faith", "Run Up", "Navy Blue", "Forever You: Eien ni Kimi to", and "I Can't Stop My Love for You", all of which achieved commercial success.

In 2003, Aiuchi released her third studio album A.I.R.. The album yielded six singles, including three top-three hits: "Deep Freeze", "Kaze no Nai Umi de Dakishimete", and "Full Jump". Her fourth album Playgirl (2004) reached number seven in Japan. The lead single from the album, "Dream×Dream" peaked at number six and has sold over 60,000 copies in Japan.

In 2006, Aiuchi released her fifth studio album Delight. The album spawned a hit double-A side single, "Glorious"/"Precious Place", which peaked at number five in Japan. After the commercial failure of the two follow-up albums, Trip (2008) and Thanx (2009), Aiuchi released her second compilation album All Singles Best: Thanx 10th Anniversary in 2009. The album was a commercial success, reaching number five on the Oricon albums chart. However, Aiuchi announced her retirement from the music industry at the end of 2010, and her eighth and last album Last Scene was released in September 2010.

In 2018, Aiuchi released her comeback single "Warm Prayer" under the name of R.

== Albums ==
=== Studio albums ===
List of albums, with selected chart positions
Title	Album details	Peak positions	Sales (JPN)	Certifications
Title	Album details	JPN Oricon	Sales (JPN)	Certifications
as Rina Aiuchi
Be Happy	Released: January 24, 2001; Label: Giza Studio; Format(s): CD, digital download	3	307,000	RIAJ: Gold
Power of Words	Released: May 15, 2002; Label: Giza Studio; Format(s): CD, digital download	1	419,000	RIAJ: Platinum
A.I.R.	Released: October 15, 2003; Label: Giza Studio; Format(s): CD, digital download	1	182,000	RIAJ: Gold
Playgirl	Released: December 15, 2004; Label: Giza Studio; Format(s): CD, digital download	7	108,000	RIAJ: Gold
Delight	Released: May 31, 2006; Label: Giza Studio; Format(s): CD, digital download	4	51,000	
Trip	Released: May 21, 2008; Label: Giza Studio; Format(s): CD, digital download	10	28,000	
Thanx	Released: March 25, 2009; Label: Giza Studio; Format(s): CD, digital download	12	22,000	
Last Scene	Released: September 15, 2010; Label: Giza Studio; Format(s): CD, digital download	8	21,000	
Ever Joyful	Released: February 4, 2026; Label: Running Rabbit; Format(s): CD, digital download	16	3,059	
as R
Ring	Released: March 23, 2020; Label: Running Rabbit; Format(s): CD, digital download, streaming	—		

=== Compilation albums ===
List of albums, with selected chart positions
Title	Album details	Peak positions	Sales (JPN)	Certifications
Title	Album details	JPN Oricon	Sales (JPN)	Certifications
Single Collection	Released: December 17, 2003; Label: Giza Studio; Format(s): CD, digital download	8	158,000	JPN: Platinum
All Singles Best: Thanx 10th Anniversary	Released: December 16, 2009; Label: Giza Studio; Format(s): CD, digital download	7	38,000	
Colors	Released: March 24, 2009; Label: Giza Studio; Format(s): CD, digital download	48	5,000	

=== Remix albums ===
List of albums, with selected chart positions
Title	Album details	Peak positions	Sales (JPN)	Certifications
Title	Album details	JPN Oricon	Sales (JPN)	Certifications
Rina Aiuchi Remixes Cool City Production vol.5	Released: July 30, 2003; Label: Giza Studio; Format(s): CD, digital download	4	73,000	JPN: Gold
Forever Songs ~Brand New Remixes~	Released: September 28, 2011; Label: Giza Studio; Format(s): CD, digital download	99	1,000	

=== Box set ===
Title	Album details
Rina Aiuchi Premier Box 2000–2010	Released: December 31, 2010; Label: Giza Studio; Format(s): CD/DVD

== Singles ==
=== As a lead artist ===
List of singles, with selected chart positions
Title	Year	Peak chart positions		Sales (JPN)	Certifications	Album
Title	Year	JPN Oricon	JPN Hot	Sales (JPN)	Certifications	Album
as Rina Aiuchi
"Close to Your Heart"	2000	19	—N/a	64,000		Be Happy
"It's Crazy for You"	2000	16	—N/a	56,000		Be Happy
"Ohh! Paradise Taste!!"	2000	23	—N/a	43,000		Be Happy
"Koi wa Thrill, Shock, Suspense"	2000	5	—N/a	105,000		Be Happy
"Faith"	2001	8	—N/a	64,000		Power of Words
"Run Up"	2001	7	—N/a	72,000		Power of Words
"Navy Blue"	2001	2	—N/a	127,000		Power of Words
"Forever You ~Eien ni Kimi to~"	2002	5	—N/a	71,000		Power of Words
"I Can't Stop My Love for You"	2002	2	—N/a	102,000		Power of Words
"Sincerely Yours"	2002	4	—N/a	82,000		A.I.R.
"Can You Feel the Power of Words?"	2002	4	—N/a	82,000		Power of Words
"Deep Freeze"	2002	3	—N/a	69,000		A.I.R.
"Kaze no Nai Umi de Dakishimete"	2003	3	—N/a	73,000	JPN: Gold	A.I.R.
"Full Jump"	2003	3	—N/a	72,000	JPN: Gold	A.I.R.
"Over Shine"	2003	6	—N/a	46,000		A.I.R.
"Kūki"	2003	7	—N/a	27,000		A.I.R.
"Dream×Dream"	2004	6	—N/a	60,000		Playgirl
"Start"	2004	8	—N/a	43,000		Playgirl
"Boom-Boom-Boom"	2004	11	—N/a	22,000		Playgirl
"Akaku Atsui Kodō"	2005	7	—N/a	22,000		Delight
"Orange Night"	2005	12	—N/a	16,000		Delight
"Glorious"	2006	5	—N/a	26,000		Delight
"Precious Place"	2006	5	—N/a	26,000		Delight
"Miracle"	2006	11	—N/a	15,000		Delight
"100 mono Tobira" (with U-ka Saegusa)	2006	8	—N/a	30,000		Non-album single
"Bara ga Saku Bara ga Chiru"	2007	15	—N/a	15,000		Trip
"Nanatsu no Umi wo Wataru Kaze no yōni" (with U-ka Saegusa)	2007	6	—N/a	37,000		Non-album single
"Mint"	2007	21	—N/a	9,000		Trip
"Nemurenu Yo ni"	2007	8	—N/a	18,000		Trip
"Party Time Party Up"	2007	8	—N/a	18,000		Trip
"I Believe You ~Ai no Hana~"	2008	17	39	8,000		Trip
"Kimi to no Deai ~Good Bye My Days~"	2008	20	68	8,000		Thanx
"Friend"	2008	8	38	12,000		Thanx
"Sugao no mama"	2008	8	—	12,000		Thanx
"Ai no Kotoba"	2009	17	89	6,000		Thanx
"Story"	2009	9	57	8,000		All Singles Best: Thanx 10th Anniversary
"Summer Light"	2009	9	—	8,000		All Singles Best: Thanx 10th Anniversary
"Magic"	2009	17	71	9,000		All Singles Best: Thanx 10th Anniversary
"Good Days"	2010	—N/a	—	—N/a		Last Scene
"Sing a Song"	2010	—N/a	—	—N/a		Last Scene
"Clover"	2010	—N/a	—	—N/a		Last Scene
"Hanabi"	2010	28	—	6,000		Last Scene
as R
"Warm Prayer"	2018	—N/a	—	—N/a		Ring
"No Fade Out"	2018	—N/a	—	—N/a		Ring
"Rise"	2019	—N/a	—	—N/a		Ring
"Mellow"	2019	—N/a	—	—N/a		Ring
as Rina Aiuchi
"Tsugihagi"	2021	—N/a	—	—N/a		Non-album singles
"Holy Cake"	2021	—N/a	—	—N/a		Non-album singles
"Very Merry Christmas"	2022	—N/a	—	—N/a		Non-album singles
"Brilliant Queen"	2023	—N/a	—	—N/a		Non-album singles
"+Inspire"	2024	20	—	—N/a		Non-album singles
"Tegami"	2025	12	—	—N/a		Non-album singles
"Let Me Fly"	2025	12	—	—N/a		Non-album singles

=== As a featured artist ===
List of singles, with selected chart positions
Title	Year	Peak chart positions	Sales (JPN)	Certifications	Album
Title	Year	JPN Oricon	Sales (JPN)	Certifications	Album
"Oneness" (As a member of Ani-Summer Friends)	2005	—N/a	—N/a	—N/a	Non-album single
"Kimi wa Boku no Aozora" (As a member of Nagisa no All-Stars)	2006	24			Non-album single
"Outride" (As a member of Ani-Summer Friends)	2006	99	2,000		Non-album single

=== Promotional singles ===
List of singles, with selected chart positions
Title	Year	Peak chart positions	Sales (JPN)	Certifications	Album
Title	Year	JPN Oricon	Sales (JPN)	Certifications	Album
"Grop"	2008	—N/a	—N/a		Non-album single

== Other appearances ==
List of non-single guest appearances, with other performing artists, showing year released and album name
Title	Year	Other performer(s)	Album
"Desperado" (As Rikako Kakiuchi)	1998	Various Artists	Eurobeat Flash Vol. 19
"I Will Survive"	2001	Various Artists	Giza Studio R&B Respect Vol.1: Six Sisters Selection
"Shut Down"	2002	Various Artists	Giza Studio Mai-K & Friends Hotrod Beach Party
"Love Is a Thrill, Shock, Suspense"	2002	Aika Ohno	Secret Garden
"Close to Your Heart"	2002	Aika Ohno	Secret Garden
"Namida no Taiyo"	2003	Tak Matsumoto	The Hit Parade
"Ai Epilogue"	2005	Tsunku	Type 2
"Joy to the World"	2010	Various Artists	Christmas Non-Stop Carol

== Video albums ==
List of video albums, with selected chart positions
Title	Album details
Premier Shot #1	Released: 5 December 2001; Label: Giza Studio; Format(s): DVD
Rina Aiuchi Live Tour 2002 "Power of Words"	Released: 17 July 2001; Label: Giza Studio; Format(s): DVD
Premier Shot #2	Released: 25 June 2002; Label: Giza Studio; Format(s): DVD
Rina Matsuri 2003	Released: 25 September 2003; Label: Giza Studio; Format(s): DVD
Rina Aiuchi Live Tour 2003 "A.I.R."	Released: 22 March 2004; Label: Giza Studio; Format(s): DVD
Rina Matsuri 2004	Released: 3 November 2004; Label: Giza Studio; Format(s): DVD
Premier Shot #3 Clip and Live Collection	Released: 27 July 2005; Label: Giza Studio; Format(s): DVD
Rina Matsuri 2005	Released: 28 September 2005; Label: Giza Studio; Format(s): DVD
Rina Matsuri 2006	Released: 11 November 2006; Label: Giza Studio; Format(s): DVD
Rina Aiuchi Valentine Live 2007	Released: 23 May 2007; Label: Giza Studio; Format(s): DVD
Premier Shot #4 Visual Collection	Released: 15 October 2008; Label: Giza Studio; Format(s): DVD
Rina Aiuchi Thanx 10th Anniversary Live Magic of Love	Released: 27 July 2010; Label: Giza Studio; Format(s): DVD
Rina Aiuchi Last Live 2010: Last Scene	Released: 31 December 2010; Label: Giza Studio; Format(s): DVD
