= All Singles Best: Thanx 10th Anniversary =

- Standard edition cover

Compilation album by Rina Aiuchi
- Released: 16 December 2009
- Recorded: 1999–2009
- Genre: J-pop; Eurobeat; anime song
- Label: Giza Studio
- Producer: Rina Aiuchi; Kanonji

Rina Aiuchi chronology
| Thanx (2009) | All Singles Best: Thanx 10th Anniversary (2009) | Colors (2010) |

Singles from All Singles Best: Thanx 10th Anniversary
- 1. "Story" Released: July 22, 2009; 2. "Summer Light" Released: July 22, 2009; 3. "Magic" Released: October 21, 2009

All Singles Best: Thanx 10th Anniversary (stylized as All Singles Best ~Thanx 10th Anniversary~) is the second compilation album by Japanese singer and songwriter Rina Aiuchi. It was released on 16 December 2009 by Giza Studio, in celebration of the 10th anniversary of the singer's debut. The album contains all her thirty-three singles from the singer's first seven studio albums, as well as three new songs which were released as singles. The standard edition of the album contained the previously unreleased song, "Gift". The compilation album superseded Single Collection (2003), which contained twelve of the singer's first fifteen singles, except "Ohh! Paradise Taste!!", "Faith" and "Over Shine".

All Singles Best: Thanx 10th Anniversary reached number seven on the Oricon albums chart and has sold over 38,109 copies. Eventually the album became the 204th best-selling album of 2010 in Japan.

== Background ==
In October 2009, Aiuchi announced the release of All Singles Best: Thanx 10th Anniversary. The compilation album was released in two editions, limited edition and standard edition. While the limited edition was accompanied with the concert DVD from Rina Matsuri 2009 -Thanx Very Much- Request Count Down and the photobook, the standard edition included the previously unreleased bonus track, "Gift". Ahead of the release, all the songs on the album were digitally remastered.

== Promotion ==
=== Live performances ===
On 20 December 2009, to promote the album, Aiuchi performed "Koi wa Thrill, Shock, Suspense" and "Magic" at the Amerikamura in Chūō-ku, Osaka with no prior announcement. In February 2010, Aiuchi held a promotional concert tour, titled Rina Aiuchi Thanx 10th Anniversary Live -Magic of the Love- in support of the album. The tour was held in the two venues, Shibuya Public Hall in Tokyo and Amagasaki Archaic Hall in Hyogo. The concert was recorded and released as a video album in July 2010, simultaneously with her single, "Hanabi".

=== Singles ===
The double A-side single, "Story"/"Summer Light" was released as the first single from the album on 22 July 2009. The single was a commercial success peaking at number eight on the Oricon Weekly Singles Chart in Japan. The second single from the album, "Magic" was released on 21 October 2009. Although it only managed to peak at number seventeen in Japan, the single sold slightly better than the previous single, selling over 8,590 copies nationwide. "Magic" served as the theme song to the anime television series, Case Closed.

== Commercial performance ==
All Singles Best: Thanx 10th Anniversary debuted at number seven on the Oricon weekly albums chart, selling 23,028 copies in its first week. The album has sold over 38,109 copies so far and became 204th best-selling album of 2010 in Japan, as well as Aiuchi's best-selling album since Delight (2006).

== Track listing ==
All lyrics are written by Rina Aiuchi

Disc 1
| No. | Title | Music | Arrangers | Length |
|---|---|---|---|---|
| 1. | "Close to Your Heart" | Aika Ohno | Kuuron Oshiro | 4:59 |
| 2. | "It's Crazy for You" | Ohno | Oshiro | 4:23 |
| 3. | "Ohh! Paradise Taste!!" | Ohno | Oshiro | 4:25 |
| 4. | "Koi wa Thrill, Shock, Suspense" | Ohno | Oshiro | 4:55 |
| 5. | "Faith" | Ohno | Oshiro | 4:44 |
| 6. | "Run Up" | Ohno | Miwa | 5:23 |
| 7. | "Navy Blue" | Daria Kawashima | Miwa | 4:20 |
| 8. | "Forever You ~Eien ni Kimi to~" | Ohno | Akihito Tokunaga | 5:06 |
| 9. | "I Can't Stop My Love for You" | Kawashima | Oshiro | 4:18 |
| 10. | "Sincerely Yours" | Koji Goto | Oshiro | 4:38 |
| 11. | "Can You Feel the Power of Words?" (DJ Me-Ya's Essence of Words) | Ohno | DJ Me-Ya | 4:04 |
| 12. | "Deep Freeze" | Terukado | Akira | 5:40 |

All lyrics are written by Rina Aiuchi

Disc 2
| No. | Title | Music | Arrangers | Length |
|---|---|---|---|---|
| 1. | "Kaze no Nai Umi de Dakishimete" | Terukado | Akira; Daisuke Ikeda | 5:03 |
| 2. | "Full Jump" | Terukado | Midori Miwa | 4:17 |
| 3. | "Over Shine" | Terukado | Akihito Tokunaga | 4:19 |
| 4. | "Kūki" | Terukado | DJ Me-Ya | 5:05 |
| 5. | "Dream×Dream" | Tokunaga | Corin. | 5:16 |
| 6. | "Start" | Aika Ohno | Corin. | 4:02 |
| 7. | "Boom-Boom-Boom" | Ohno | Corin. | 4:22 |
| 8. | "Akaku Atsui Kodō" | Masaaki Watanuki | Masazumi Ozawa | 3:21 |
| 9. | "Orange Night" | Mikiko Mizuno | Makoto Miyoshi | 3:26 |
| 10. | "Glorious" | Ohno | Takeshi Hayama | 4:13 |
| 11. | "Precious Place" | Miho Komatsu | Kazuhito Tsukui | 4:13 |
| 12. | "Miracle" | Ohno | Hayama | 4:09 |

All lyrics are written by Rina Aiuchi

Disc 3
| No. | Title | Music | Arrangers | Length |
|---|---|---|---|---|
| 1. | "Bara ga Saku Bara ga Chiru" | Hisanao Kojima | Takeshi Hayama | 4:38 |
| 2. | "Mint" | Taishi Senda | Senda | 5:00 |
| 3. | "Nemurenu Yo ni" | Koji Goto | Goto | 5:31 |
| 4. | "Party Time Party Up" | Akihito Tokunaga | Yoshinobu Ohga | 4:48 |
| 5. | "I Believe You ~Ai no Hana~" | Goto | Goto | 5:04 |
| 6. | "Kimi to no Deai ~Good Bye My Days~" | Takahiro Hiraga | Kenji Arai | 4:40 |
| 7. | "Friend" | Tomohiro Sudo | Arai | 5:23 |
| 8. | "Sugao no mama" | Masazumi Ozawa | Ozawa | 4:58 |
| 9. | "Ai no Kotoba" | Hiraga | Arai | 4:58 |
| 10. | "Story" | Sudo | Hayama | 5:06 |
| 11. | "Summer Light" | Munetaka Kawamoto | Arai | 3:57 |
| 12. | "Magic" | Aika Ohno | Hayama | 4:00 |

All lyrics are written by Rina Aiuchi

Disc 3 (Standard edition)
| No. | Title | Music | Arrangers | Length |
|---|---|---|---|---|
| 13. | "Gift" | Sudo | Junnichi Matsuda | 4:55 |

All lyrics are written by Rina Aiuchi

DVD (Limited edition)
| No. | Title | Music | Arrangers | Length |
|---|---|---|---|---|
| 1. | "Friend" (From Rina Matsuri 2009 -Thanx Very Much- Request Count Down) | Tomohiro Sudo | Kenji Arai |
| 2. | "Green Way" (From Rina Matsuri 2009 -Thanx Very Much- Request Count Down) | Aika Ohno | Kuuron Oshiro |
| 3. | "Navy Blue" (From Rina Matsuri 2009 -Thanx Very Much- Request Count Down) | Daria Kawashima | Midori Miwa |
| 4. | "Delight" (From Rina Matsuri 2009 -Thanx Very Much- Request Count Down) | Ohno | Junnichi Matsuda; Maiko Iuchi |
| 5. | "Yellow Carpet" (From Rina Matsuri 2009 -Thanx Very Much- Request Count Down) | Takahiro Hiraga | Hiraga |
| 6. | "Forever You ~Eien ni Kimi to~" (From Rina Matsuri 2009 -Thanx Very Much- Request Count Down) | Ohno | Akihito Tokunaga |
| 7. | "Dear... From..." (From Rina Matsuri 2009 -Thanx Very Much- Request Count Down) | Masanao Kitaura | Oshiro |
| 8. | "Her Lament ~Dare ni mo Kikoenai Kanojo no Sakebi~" (From Rina Matsuri 2009 -Thanx Very Much- Request Count Down) | Miho Komatsu | KCP |
| 9. | "Koi wa Thrill, Shock, Suspense" (From Rina Matsuri 2009 -Thanx Very Much- Request Count Down) | Ohno | Oshiro |
| 10. | "Dream×Dream" (From Rina Matsuri 2009 -Thanx Very Much- Request Count Down) | Akihito Tokunaga | Corin. |

== Charts ==
=== Weekly charts ===
| Chart (2009) | Peak position |
|---|---|
| Japan (Oricon) | 7 |

=== Monthly charts ===
| Chart (2009) | Position |
|---|---|
| Japan (Oricon) | 27 |

== Certification and sales ==
| Region | Certification | Certified units/sales |
|---|---|---|
| Japan (RIAJ) | None | 38,109 |

== Release history ==
| Region | Date | Format | Catalogue Num. | Label | Ref. |
|---|---|---|---|---|---|
| Japan | 16 December 2009 | 3CD | GZCA-5208~10 | Giza Studio | |
| Japan | 16 December 2009 | 3CD+DVD | GZCA-5205~7 | Giza Studio | |
| Japan | 16 December 2009 | Digital download | | Giza Studio | |
