= Colors (Rina Aiuchi album) =

Compilation album by Rina Aiuchi
- Released: 24 March 2010
- Recorded: 1999–2009
- Genre: J-pop; eurobeat
- Label: Giza Studio
- Producer: Rina Aiuchi; Kanonji

Rina Aiuchi chronology
All Singles Best: Thanx 10th Anniversary (2009)	Colors (2010)	Last Scene (2010)

Colors is the second compilation album by Japanese singer and songwriter Rina Aiuchi. It was released on 24 March 2010 by Giza Studio. The concept album features the color as its theme, including 17 previously released B-side and album tracks with the colors in their titles. Colors reached number forty-eight on the Oricon albums chart in and has sold over 4,503 copies.

== Track listing ==
All lyrics are written by Rina Aiuchi

No.	Title	Music	Arrangers	Length
1.	"Black Eyes, Blue Tears"	Aika Ohno	Kuuron Oshiro	4:42
2.	"Painted Black"	Masanao Kitaura	Akihito Tokunaga	4:08
3.	"Little Grey Mermaid"	Deron Reynolds	Buddhaphonic	4:11
4.	"Silver Hide and Seek"	K's Letters	Yoshinobu Ohga	3:50
5.	"Rainbow"	Daria Kawashima	Oshiro	4:16
6.	"Marble"	Marion.	Kenji Arai	4:27
7.	"Pink Baby's Breath"	Terukado	Hiroshi Terao	5:03
8.	"Sakura Iro"	Masanori Kobayashi	Junnichi Matsuda	5:13
9.	"Lavender Rain"	Terukado	S. Kobayashi	4:28
10.	"Purple Haze"	Mina Kaneko	KCP	4:51
11.	"Green Way" (Akane Hosen)	Akane Hosen	Oshiro	4:35
12.	"Kira Kira"	Corin.	Corin.	4:47
13.	"Yellow Carpet"	Takahiro Hiraga	Hiraga	4:38
14.	"Golden Moonlight"	Ohno	Oshiro	4:16
15.	"Hikari Iro no Kakera"	Yuichiro Iwai	Oshiro	5:03
16.	"Ruby Stars"	Yuri Godai	Akira	4:51
17.	"Red Bonds"	Terukado	Miwa	3:46

== Charts ==
Chart (2010)	Peak position
Japan (Oricon)	48

== Certification and sales ==
Region	Certification	Certified units/sales
Japan (RIAJ)	None	4,503

== Release history ==
Region	Date	Format	Catalogue Num.	Label	Ref.
Japan	24 March 2010	CD	GZCA-5219	Giza Studio	
Japan	24 March 2010	Digital download		Giza Studio	
