= Single Collection (Rina Aiuchi album) =

Compilation album by Rina Aiuchi
- Released: 17 December 2003
- Recorded: 1999–2003
- Genre: J-pop; eurobeat
- Label: Giza Studio
- Producer: Rina Aiuchi; Kanonji

Rina Aiuchi chronology
A.I.R. (2003)	Single Collection (2003)	Playgirl (2004)

Single Collection is the first compilation album by Japanese singer and songwriter Rina Aiuchi. It was released on 17 December 2003 by Giza Studio. The album reached number 8 on the Oricon albums chart in its first week and charted for ten weeks.

== Track listing ==
All lyrics are written by Rina Aiuchi

No.	Title	Music	Arrangers	Length
1.	"Full Jump"	Terukado	Midori Miwa	4:17
2.	"I Can't Stop My Love for You"	Daria Kawashima	Kuuron Oshiro	4:17
3.	"Koi wa Thrill, Shock, Suspense" (恋はスリル、ショック、サスペンス)	Aika Ohno	Oshiro	4:56
4.	"Sincerely Yours"	Koji Goto	Oshiro	4:25
5.	"Forever You ~Eien ni Kimi to~" (Forever You ~永遠に君と~)	Ohno	Akihito Tokunaga	5:07
6.	"Navy Blue"	Kawashima	Miwa	4:56
7.	"Kaze no Nai Umi de Dakishimete" (風のない海で抱きしめて)	Terukado	Akira; Daisuke Ikeda	5:04
8.	"Close to Your Heart"	Ohno	Oshiro	5:02
9.	"It's Crazy for You"	Ohno	Oshiro	4:22
10.	"Run Up"	Ohno	Miwa	5:24
11.	"Deep Freeze"	Terukado	Akira	5:42
12.	"Kūki" (空気)	Terukado	DJ Me-Ja	5:06

== Charts ==
=== Weekly charts ===
Chart (2003)	Peak position
Japan (Oricon)	8

=== Monthly charts ===
Chart (2003)	Position
Japan (Oricon)	17

== Certification and sales ==
Region	Certification	Certified units/sales
Japan (RIAJ)	Platinum	157,523
