= Nanatsu no Umi wo Wataru Kaze no yōni =

2007 single by Rina Aiuchi and U-ka Saegusa

- Standard edition cover

Single by Rina Aiuchi and U-ka Saegusa
- B-side: "Destiny (Rearrange Version); Negai goto Hitotsu dake (Rearrange Version)"
- Released: April 11, 2007
- Genre: J-pop; anime song
- Length: 3:54
- Label: Giza Studio
- Songwriter(s): Rina Aiuchi; U-ka Saegusa; Aika Ohno
- Producer(s): Kannonji

Rina Aiuchi singles chronology
"Bara ga Saku Bara ga Chiru" (2007)	"Nanatsu no Umi wo Wataru Kaze no yōni" (2007)	"Mint" (2007)

U-ka Saegusa singles chronology
"Kumo ni Notte" (2007)	"Nanatsu no Umi wo Wataru Kaze no yōni" (2007)	"Ashita wa Ashita no Kaze no Naka......Yume no Naka" / "Atarashii Jibun e Kawaru Switch" (2007)

"Nanatsu no Umi wo Wataru Kaze no yōni" (七つの海を渡る風のように, lit. "Like the Wind That Cross the Seven Seas") is a song by Japanese singer-songwriters Rina Aiuchi and U-ka Saegusa. It was released on 11 April 2007 through Giza Studio, for the soundtrack of the Japanese animated film Detective Conan: Jolly Roger in the Deep Azure. The single became the duo's second single, following "100 mono Tobira" in 2006, which also served as the theme song to the anime series. The single reached number six in Japan and has sold over 36,587 copies nationwide.

== Background ==
In March 2007, Aiuchi and Saegusa announced that they would release the theme song to Detective Conan: Jolly Roger in the Deep Azure, the film adaptation of the Japanese anime series, Case Closed, for which the two had long written the theme songs. It was later confirmed that they recorded the cover versions of the past theme songs to the anime series, "Destiny" by Miki Matsuhashi and "Negai goto Hitotsu dake" by Miho Komatsu.

== Commercial performance ==
"Nanatsu no Umi wo Wataru Kaze no yōni" debuted at number six on the Oricon weekly singles chart and has sold over 36,587 copies in Japan, becoming Aiuchi's best-selling single since "Start" in 2004 and Saegusa's best-selling single overall.

== Track listing ==
CD single (Standard edition)
No.	Title	Writer(s)	Arranger(s)	Length
1.	"Nanatsu no Umi wo Wataru Kaze no yōni"	Rina Aiuchi; U-ka Saegusa; Aika Ohno	Takeshi Hayama	3:54
2.	"Destiny" (Rearrange Version)	Satomi Asakoshi; Kazunobu Mashima	Yoshinobu Ohga	4:07
3.	"Negai goto Hitotsu dake" (Rearrange Version)	Miho Komatsu	Ohga	4:41
4.	"Nanatsu no Umi wo Wataru Kaze no yōni" (Instrumental)	Aiuchi; Saegusa; Ōno	Hayama	3:53

CD single (Limited edition)
No.	Title	Writer(s)	Arranger(s)	Length
4.	"Nanatsu no Umi wo Wataru Kaze no yōni" (Rina's Vocalless Version)	Aiuchi; Saegusa; Ohno	Hayama	3:55
5.	"Nanatsu no Umi wo Wataru Kaze no yōni" (U-ka's Vocalless Version)	Aiuchi; Saegusa; Ohno	Hayama	3:53

== Charts ==
Chart (2007)	Peak position
Japan (Oricon)	6

== Certification and sales ==
Region	Certification	Certified units/sales
Japan (RIAJ)	None	36,587

== Release history ==
Region	Date	Format	Catalogue Num.	Label	Ref.
Japan	11 April 2007	CD (Standard edition)	GZCA-4093	Giza Studio	
Japan	11 April 2007	CD (Limited edition)	GZCA-4092	Giza Studio	
