= Tegami/Let Me Fly =

Single by Rina Aiuchi
- B-side: "Kiss Kiss Kiss; Play High"
- Released: April 29, 2025
- Genre: J-pop
- Label: Running Rabbit; Rock Field
- Songwriters: Rina Aiuchi; Kentaro Ishii

Rina Aiuchi singles chronology
"+Inspire" (2025)	"Tegami/Let Me Fly" (2025)

"Tegami/Let Me Fly" is a double-A side single by Japanese singer-songwriter Rina Aiuchi. It was released on 29 April 2025 through Running Rabbit and Rock Field. The single reached number twelve in Japan and has sold over 3,561 copies nationwide.

== Track listing ==
No.	Title	Writer(s)	Arranger(s)	Length
1.	"Tegami"	Rina Aiuchi; Kentaro Ishii	Kentaro Ishii	6:14
2.	"Let Me Fly"	Aiuchi; Ishii	Ishii	3:55
3.	"Kiss Kiss Kiss"	Aiuchi; Ishii	Ishii	4:05
4.	"Play High" (featuring TKQ)	Aiuchi; Ishii	Ishii	4:41
5.	"Tegami" (Instrumental)	Aiuchi; Ishii	Ishii	6:14
6.	"Let Me Fly" (Instrumental)	Aiuchi; Ishii	Ishii	3:55

== Charts ==
Chart (2025)	Peak position
Japan (Oricon)	12

== Certification and sales ==
Region	Certification	Certified units/sales
Japan (RIAJ)	None	3,561

== Release history ==
Region	Date	Format	Type	Catalogue Num.	Label	Ref.
Japan	29 April 2025	CD	QARF-60304	Type A	Running Rabbit; Rock Field	
Japan	29 April 2025	CD+DVD	QARF-60305/6	Type B	Running Rabbit; Rock Field	
