= Last Scene =

Last Scene may refer to:

- Last Scene (album), a 2010 album by Rina Aiuchi
- Last Scene (EP), a 2022 EP by Chen
- "Last Scene", a song by Psy from his 2017 EP 4X2=8
- "Last Scene" (featuring Wonstein), a song by IU from her 2025 EP A Flower Bookmark 3
