= Magic (Rina Aiuchi song) =

2009 single by Rina Aiuchi

- Standard edition/digital download cover

Single by Rina Aiuchi

from the album All Singles Best ~Thanx 10th Anniversary~
- B-side: "Hands"
- Released: October 21, 2009
- Genre: J-pop; anime song
- Length: 3:59
- Label: Giza Studio
- Songwriter(s): Rina Aiuchi; Aika Ohno
- Producer(s): Rina Aiuchi; Kannonji

Rina Aiuchi singles chronology
| "Story" / "Summer Light" (2009) | "Magic" (2009) | "Good Days" (2010) |

"Magic" (stylized in all caps) is a song by Japanese singer-songwriter Rina Aiuchi. It was released on 21 October 2009 through Giza Studio, as the second single from her second compilation album All Singles Best: Thanx 10th Anniversary. The single reached number seventeen in Japan and has sold over 8,590 copies nationwide. The song served as the theme songs to the Japanese anime television series, Case Closed.

== Track listing ==
CD single
| No. | Title | Writer(s) | Arranger(s) | Length |
|---|---|---|---|---|
| 1. | "Magic" | Rina Aiuchi; Aika Ohno | Takeshi Hayama | 3:59 |
| 2. | "Hands" | Aiuchi; Toshiaki Ohta | Hirohito Furui | 3:27 |
| 3. | "Magic" (Instrumental) | Aiuchi; Ohno | Hayama | 4:00 |
| 4. | "Hands" (Instrumental) | Aiuchi; Ohta | Furui | 3:25 |

Limited edition bonus DVD
| No. | Title | Writer(s) | Arranger(s) | Length |
|---|---|---|---|---|
| 1. | "Magic" (Music Clip) | Rina Aiuchi; Aika Ohno | Takeshi Hayama |
| 2. | "Magic" (Making Shot) |

Digital download
| No. | Title | Writer(s) | Arranger(s) | Length |
|---|---|---|---|---|
| 1. | "Magic" | Rina Aiuchi; Aika Ohno | Takeshi Hayama | 3:59 |
| 2. | "Hands" | Aiuchi; Toshiaki Ohta | Hirohito Furui | 3:27 |

== Charts ==
| Chart (2009) | Peak position |
|---|---|
| Japan (Oricon) | 17 |

== Certification and sales ==
| Region | Certification | Certified units/sales |
|---|---|---|
| Japan (RIAJ) | None | 8,590 |

== Release history ==
| Region | Date | Format | Catalogue Num. | Label | Ref. |
|---|---|---|---|---|---|
| Japan | 11 February 2009 | CD | GZCA-7153 | Giza Studio | |
| Japan | 11 February 2009 | CD+DVD | GZCA-7152 | Giza Studio | |
| Japan | 11 February 2009 | Digital download | | Giza Studio | |
