= Glorious/Precious Place =

2006 single by Rina Aiuchi

Single by Rina Aiuchi

from the album Delight
- Released: March 29, 2006
- Genre: J-pop; anime song; synth pop
- Length: 4:11; 4:17
- Label: Giza Studio
- Songwriter(s): Rina Aiuchi; Aika Ohno; Miho Komatsu
- Producer(s): Rina Aiuchi; Kannonji

Rina Aiuchi singles chronology
| "Orange Night" (2005) | "Glorious/Precious Place" (2006) | "Miracle" (2006) |

"Glorious"/"Precious Place" (stylized in all caps) is a single by Japanese singer-songwriter Rina Aiuchi. It was released on 29 March 2006 through Giza Studio, as the third single from her fifth studio album Delight. The double A-side single reached number five in Japan and has sold over 26,488 copies nationwide. Both songs served as the theme songs to the PlayStation 2 video game, Another Century's Episode 2.

== Commercial performance ==
"Glorious"/"Precious Place" has sold over 26,488 copies and peaked at number five on the Oricon weekly singles chart, becoming her first single to reach top five since "Full Jump" in 2003.

== Track listing ==
CD single
| No. | Title | Writer(s) | Arranger(s) | Length |
|---|---|---|---|---|
| 1. | "Glorious" | Rina Aiuchi; Aika Ohno | Takeshi Hayama | 4:11 |
| 2. | "Precious Place" | Aiuchi; Miho Komatsu | Kazuhito Tsukui | 4:17 |
| 3. | "Glorious" (A.C.E. 2 ver.) | Aiuchi; Ohno | Yuya Ban | 4:25 |
| 4. | "Glorious" (A.C.E.2 Battle Mode ver.) | Aiuchi; Ohno | | 4:25 |
| 5. | "Precious Place" (A.C.E.2 Battle Mode ver.) | Aiuchi; Komatsu | | 4:30 |
| 6. | "Glorious" (Another Composite Edition) | Aiuchi; Ohno | Nakedgrun | 4:14 |

== Charts ==
| Chart (2006) | Peak position |
|---|---|
| Japan (Oricon) | 5 |

== Certification and sales ==
| Region | Certification | Certified units/sales |
|---|---|---|
| Japan (RIAJ) | None | 26,488 |

== Release history ==
| Region | Date | Format | Catalogue Num. | Label | Ref. |
|---|---|---|---|---|---|
| Japan | 29 March 2006 | CD | GZCA-7069 | Giza Studio | |
