= Sincerely Yours/Can You Feel the Power of Words =

"Sincerely Yours/Can You Feel the Power of Words?"

Single by Rina Aiuchi

from the album Power of Words A.I.R.
- B-side: "Red Bonds"
- Released: August 1, 2002
- Recorded: 2001–2002
- Genre: J-pop
- Length: 4:40; 4:06
- Label: Giza Studio
- Songwriter(s): Rina Aiuchi; Koji Goto; Aika Ohno
- Producer(s): Rina Aiuchi; Kannonji

Rina Aiuchi singles chronology
"I Can't Stop My Love for You" (2002)	"Sincerely Yours/Can You Feel the Power of Words?" (2002)	"Deep Freeze" (2002)

"Sincerely Yours/Can You Feel the Power of Words?" (stylized as "Sincerely Yours/Can you feel the POWER OF WORDS?") is a double-A side single by Japanese singer-songwriter Rina Aiuchi. It was released on 1 August 2002 through Giza Studio. "Sincerely Yours" was released as the first single from her third studio album A.I.R. while "Can You Feel the Power of Words?" was released as the sixth single from her second studio album Power of Words. Both songs served as the theme song to the Japanese television show The Letters ~ Kazoku no Ai ni Arigato. The single reached number four in Japan and has sold over 81,910 copies nationwide.

== Track listing ==
CD single
No.	Title	Writer(s)	Arranger(s)	Length
1.	"Sincerely Yours"	Rina Aiuchi; Koji Goto	Kuuron Oshiro	4:40
2.	"Can You Feel the Power of Words?" (DJ Me-Ya's Essence of Words)	Aiuchi; Aika Ohno	DJ Me-Ya	4:06
3.	"Red Bonds"	Aiuchi; Terukado	Midori Miwa	3:49
4.	"Sincerely Yours" (Instrumental)	Aiuchi; Goto	Osiro	4:41
5.	"Can You Feel the Power of Words?" (DJ Me-Ya's Essence of Words)(Instrumental)	Aiuchi; Ohno	DJ Me-Ya	4:03

== Charts ==
Chart (2002)	Peak position
Japan (Oricon)	4

== Certification and sales ==
Region	Certification	Certified units/sales
Japan (RIAJ)	None	81,910

== Release history ==
Region	Date	Format	Catalogue Num.	Label	Ref.
Japan	1 August 2002	CD	GZCA-2043	Giza Studio	
