= Kimi to no Deai ~Good Bye My Days~ =

2008 single by Rina Aiuchi

- Limited edition cover

Single by Rina Aiuchi

from the album Thanx
- B-side: Simple; Will You Dance? (Limited edition)
- Released: October 15, 2008
- Genre: J-pop
- Length: 4:38
- Label: Giza Studio
- Songwriter(s): Rina Aiuchi; Takahiro Hiraga
- Producer(s): Rina Aiuchi; Kannonji

Rina Aiuchi singles chronology
"I Believe You ~Ai no Hana~" (2008)	"Kimi to no Deai ~Good Bye My Days~" (2008)	"Friend" / "Sugao no mama" (2008)

"Kimi to no Deai ~Good Bye My Days~" (君との出逢い ～good bye my days～; lit. "Encounter with You ~Good Bye My Days~") is a song by Japanese singer-songwriter Rina Aiuchi. It was released on 15 October 2008 through Giza Studio, as the lead single from her seventh studio album Thanx. The single reached number twenty in Japan and has sold over 8,256 copies nationwide. The song served as the theme songs to the Japanese television show, Nihonshi Suspense Gekijo.

== Track listing ==
CD single (Standard edition)
No.	Title	Writer(s)	Arranger(s)	Length
1.	"Kimi to no Deai ~Good Bye My Days~"	Rina Aiuchi; Takahiro Hiraga	Kenji Arai	4:38
2.	"Simple"	Aiuchi; Hiraga	Kazuhito Tsukui	4:18
3.	"Kimi to no Deai ~Good Bye My Days~" (Instrumental)	Aiuchi; Hiraga	Arai	4:41
4.	"Simple" (Instrumental)	Aiuchi; Hiraga	Arai	4:19

CD single (Limited edition)
No.	Title	Writer(s)	Arranger(s)	Length
3.	"Will You Dance?"	Yuki Misao; Double S	Yasumasa Ito	4:43
4.	"Kimi to no Deai ~Good Bye My Days~" (Instrumental)	Aiuchi; Hiraga	Arai	4:41
5.	"Simple" (Instrumental)	Aiuchi; Hiraga	Arai	4:19

== Charts ==
Chart (2008)	Peak position
Japan (Oricon)	20

== Certification and sales ==
Region	Certification	Certified units/sales
Japan (RIAJ)	None	8,256

== Release history ==
Region	Date	Format	Catalogue Num.	Label	Ref.
Japan	15 October 2008	CD (Limited edition	GZCA-4114	Giza Studio	
Japan	15 October 2008	CD (Standard edition)	GZCA-7125	Giza Studio	
