= Orange Night =

2005 single by Rina Aiuchi

Single by Rina Aiuchi

from the album Delight
- B-side: "Call My Name; Dakishimete"
- Released: November 2, 2005
- Genre: J-pop; punk; anime song
- Length: 3:26
- Label: Giza Studio
- Songwriter(s): Rina Aiuchi; Mikiko Mizuno
- Producer(s): Rina Aiuchi; Kannonji

Rina Aiuchi singles chronology
"Akaku Atsui Kodō" (2005)	"Orange Night" (2005)	"Glorious" / "Precious Place" (2006)

"Orange Night" (stylized as "ORANGE★NIGHT") is a song by Japanese singer-songwriter Rina Aiuchi. It was released on 2 November 2005 through Giza Studio, as the second single from her fifth studio album Delight. The song reached number twelve in Japan and has sold over 16,058 copies nationwide. The song served as the theme song to the Japanese anime television series, Fighting Beauty Wulong.

== Track listing ==
CD single
No.	Title	Writer(s)	Arranger(s)	Length
1.	"Orange Night"	Rina Aiuchi; Mikiko Mizuno	Makoto Miyoshi	3:26
2.	"Call My Name"	Aiuchi; Corin.	Corin.	4:49
3.	"Dakishimete" (抱きしめて)	Yuusuke Ogawa	Kuuron Oshiro	5:14
4.	"Orange Night" (Instrumental)	Aiuchi; Mizuno	Miyoshi	3:24

== Charts ==
Chart (2005)	Peak position
Japan (Oricon)	12

== Certification and sales ==
Region	Certification	Certified units/sales
Japan (RIAJ)	None	16,058

== Release history ==
Region	Date	Format	Catalogue Num.	Label	Ref.
Japan	2 November 2005	CD	GZCA-4053	Giza Studio	
