= Story (Rina Aiuchi song) =

2009 single by Rina Aiuchi

- Standard edition/digital download cover

Single by Rina Aiuchi

from the album All Singles Best ~Thanx 10th Anniversary~
- B-side: "Marble"
- Released: July 22, 2009
- Genre: J-pop
- Length: 5:06
- Label: Giza Studio
- Songwriter(s): Rina Aiuchi; Tomohiro Sudo
- Producer(s): Rina Aiuchi; Kannonji

Rina Aiuchi singles chronology
"Ai no Kotoba" (2009)	"Story" / "Summer Light" (2009)	"Magic" (2009)

"Story" (stylized in all caps) is a song by Japanese singer-songwriter Rina Aiuchi. It was released on 22 July 2009 through Giza Studio, as a double A-side with "Summer Light" and the lead single from her second compilation album All Singles Best: Thanx 10th Anniversary. The single was released in three editions: one standard edition and two limited editions. Following the release, the single peaked at number nine in Japan and has sold over 8,413 copies nationwide. The song served as the theme song to the Japanese television show All Japan High School Quiz Championship.

== Track listing ==
CD single (Limited edition A)
No.	Title	Writer(s)	Arranger(s)	Length
1.	"Story"	Rina Aiuchi; Tomohiro Sudo	Takeshi Hayama	5:06
2.	"Summer Light"	Aiuchi; Munetaka Kawamoto	Kenji Arai	3:58
3.	"Story" (Instrumental)	Aiuchi; Sudo	Hayama	5:08
4.	"Summer Light" (Instrumental)	Aiuchi; Kawamoto	Arai	3:56

CD single (Standard edition)
No.	Title	Writer(s)	Arranger(s)	Length
3.	"Marble"	Aiuchi; Marion.	Arai	4:28
4.	"Story" (Instrumental)	Aiuchi; Sudo	Hayama	5:08
5.	"Summer Light" (Instrumental)	Aiuchi; Kawamoto	Arai	3:56

Limited edition A bonus DVD
No.	Title	Writer(s)	Length
1.	"Story" (Music Clip)	Aiuchi; Sudo

CD single (Limited edition B)
No.	Title	Writer(s)	Arranger(s)	Length
1.	"Summer Light"	Rina Aiuchi; Munetaka Kawamoto	Kenji Arai	3:58
2.	"Story"	Aiuchi; Tomohiro Sudo	Takeshi Hayama	5:06
3.	"Summer Light" (Instrumental)	Aiuchi; Kawamoto	Arai	3:56
4.	"Story" (Instrumental)	Aiuchi; Sudo	Hayama	5:08

Limited edition B bonus DVD
No.	Title	Writer(s)	Length
1.	"Summer Light" (Music Clip)	Aiuchi; Kawamoto

Digital download
No.	Title	Writer(s)	Arranger(s)	Length
1.	"Story"	Rina Aiuchi; Tomohiro Sudo	Takeshi Hayama	5:05
2.	"Summer Light"	Aiuchi; Munetaka Kawamoto	Kenji Arai	3:57
3.	"Marble"	Aiuchi; Marion.	Arai	4:28

== Charts ==
Chart (2009)	Peak position
Japan (Oricon)	9

== Certification and sales ==
Region	Certification	Certified units/sales
Japan (RIAJ)	None	8,413

== Release history ==
Region	Date	Format	Catalogue Num.	Label	Ref.
Japan	22 July 2009	CD	GZCA-4128	Giza Studio	
Japan	22 July 2009	CD+DVD (Limited edition A)	GZCA-7146	Giza Studio	
Japan	22 July 2009	CD+DVD (Limited edition B)	GZCA-7147	Giza Studio	
Japan	22 July 2009	Digital download		Giza Studio	
