= Boom-Boom-Boom =

2004 single by Rina Aiuchi

Single by Rina Aiuchi

from the album Playgirl
- B-side: "Alright; Rock Steady"
- Released: October 20, 2004
- Genre: J-pop; rock
- Length: 4:23
- Label: Giza Studio
- Songwriter(s): Rina Aiuchi; Aika Ohno
- Producer(s): Rina Aiuchi; Kannonji

Rina Aiuchi singles chronology
"Start" (2004)	"Boom-Boom-Boom" (2004)	"Akaku Atsui Kodō" (2005)

"Boom-Boom-Boom" is a song by Japanese singer-songwriter Rina Aiuchi. It was released on 20 October 2004 through Giza Studio, as the third single from her fourth studio album Playgirl. The song reached number eleven in Japan and has sold over 22,030 copies nationwide. The song served as the theme song to the Japanese television series, Truth or Doubt and Ongaku Senshi Music Fighter.

== Commercial performance ==
"Boom-Boom-Boom" has sold over 22,030 copies in Japan and managed to peak at number eleven on the Oricon weekly singles chart, becoming her first single not to reach top ten since "Ohh! Paradise Taste!!" in 2000.

== Track listing ==
CD single
No.	Title	Writer(s)	Arranger(s)	Length
1.	"Boom-Boom-Boom"	Rina Aiuchi; Aika Ohno	Corin.	4:23
2.	"Alright"	Aiuchi; Daria Kawashima	Kuuron Oshiro	4:11
3.	"Rock Steady"	Kawashima	Corin.	4:00
4.	"Boom-Boom-Boom" (Instrumental)	Aiuchi; Ohno	Corin.	4:21

== Charts ==
Chart (2004)	Peak position
Japan (Oricon)	11

== Certification and sales ==
Region	Certification	Certified units/sales
Japan (RIAJ)	None	22,030

== Release history ==
Region	Date	Format	Catalogue Num.	Label	Ref.
Japan	20 October 2004	CD	GZCA-4006	Giza Studio	
