= +Inspire =

2024 single by Rina Aiuchi

Single by Rina Aiuchi
- B-side: "Brilliant Queen"
- Released: December 10, 2024
- Genre: J-pop
- Length: 3:33
- Label: Running Rabbit; Rock Field
- Songwriters: Rina Aiuchi; Kentaro Ishii

Rina Aiuchi singles chronology
"Brilliant Queen" (2023)	"+Inspire" (2024)

Music video
- "+Inspire" on YouTube

"+Inspire" (pronounced as "Plus Inspire") is a song by Japanese singer-songwriter Rina Aiuchi. It was released on 10 December 2024 through Running Rabbit and Rock Field, as the fifth single from her upcoming tenth studio album. This release marked her first major release in thirteen years since Forever Songs ~Brand New Remixes~ (2011), distributed by Nippon Columbia as Aiuchi's first release through the company.

== Promotion ==
In support of the release of "+Inspire", Aiuchi embarked on a promotional in-store event tour, starting from 29 September 2024 at LaLaPort Toyosu.

== Commercial performance ==
"+Inspire" debuted at number two on the Oricon Daily Singles Chart, partly because the single was released on Monday whereas the CD is practically released on Wednesday in Japan. "+Inspire" debuted at number 20 on the Oricon Weekly Singles Chart with the sales of 2,906 copies. It fell to number 108 on its second week, selling 153 copies.

== Track listing ==
CD single
No.	Title	Writer(s)	Arranger(s)	Length
1.	"+Inspire"	Rina Aiuchi; Kentaro Ishii	Ishii
2.	"Brilliant Queen"	Aiuchi; Ishii	Ishii
3.	"+Inspire" (Instrumental)	Aiuchi; Ishii	Ishii
4.	"Brilliant Queen" (Instrumental)	Aiuchi; Ishii	Ishii

== Charts ==
=== Daily charts ===
Chart (2024)	Peak position
Japan (Oricon)	2

=== Weekly charts ===
Chart (2024)	Peak position
Japan (Oricon)	20

== Release history ==
Region	Date	Format	Catalogue Num.	Label	Ref.
Japan	10 December 2024	CD	QARF-67001	Running Rabbit; Rock Field	
Japan	14 December 2024	Digital download		Running Rabbit; Rock Field	
