= Deep Freeze (song) =

2002 single by Rina Aiuchi

Single by Rina Aiuchi

from the album A.I.R.
- B-side: "White X-mas Song"
- Released: November 20, 2002
- Genre: J-pop
- Length: 5:41
- Label: Giza Studio
- Songwriter(s): Rina Aiuchi; Terukado
- Producer(s): Rina Aiuchi; Kannonji

Rina Aiuchi singles chronology
"Sincerely Yours" / "Can You Feel the Power of Words?" (2002)	"Deep Freeze" (2002)	"Kaze no Nai Umi de Dakishimete" (2003)

"Deep Freeze" is a song by Japanese singer-songwriter Rina Aiuchi. It was released on 20 November 2002 through Giza Studio, as the second single from her third studio album A.I.R.. The song reached number three in Japan and has sold over 69,348 copies nationwide. The song served as the theme song to the Japanese television shows, Pro no Domyaku and Ax Music-TV.

== Track listing ==
CD single
No.	Title	Writer(s)	Arranger(s)	Length
1.	"Deep Freeze"	Rina Aiuchi; Terukado	Akira	5:41
2.	"White X-mas Song"	Aiuchi; Terukado	Midori Miwa	4:15
3.	"Deep Freeze" (Instrumental)	Aiuchi; Terukado	Akira	5:44
4.	"White X-mas Song" (Instrumental)	Aiuchi; Terukado	Miwa	4:10

== Charts ==
Chart (2002)	Peak position
Japan (Oricon)	3

== Certification and sales ==
Region	Certification	Certified units/sales
Japan (RIAJ)	None	69,348

== Release history ==
Region	Date	Format	Catalogue Num.	Label	Ref.
Japan	20 November 2002	CD	GZCA-7002	Giza Studio	
