= Akaku Atsui Kodō =

2005 single by Rina Aiuchi

Single by Rina Aiuchi

from the album Delight
- B-side: "Fantasy Rush; Ai ga Mietayo"
- Released: May 4, 2005
- Genre: J-pop; rock; anime song
- Length: 3:22
- Label: Giza Studio
- Songwriter(s): Rina Aiuchi; Masaaki Watanuki
- Producer(s): Rina Aiuchi; Kannonji

Rina Aiuchi singles chronology
"Boom-Boom-Boom" (2004)	"Akaku Atsui Kodō" (2005)	"Orange Night" (2005)

"Akaku Atsui Kodō" (赤く熱い鼓動, lit. "Red Hot Beat") is a song by Japanese singer-songwriter Rina Aiuchi. It was released on 4 May 2005 through Giza Studio, as the lead single from her fifth studio album Delight. The song reached number seven in Japan and has sold over 21,854 copies nationwide. The song served as the theme song to the Japanese tokusatsu television series, Ultraman Nexus.

== Track listing ==
CD single
No.	Title	Writer(s)	Arranger(s)	Length
1.	"Akaku Atsui Kodō"	Rina Aiuchi; Masaaki Watanuki	Masazumi Ozawa	3:22
2.	"Fantasy Rush"	Aiuchi; Yuumi Asakawa	T-Saitoh	4:17
3.	"Ai ga Mietayo"	Corin.	Corin.	4:54
4.	"Akaku Atsui Kodō" (TV Version)	Aiuchi; Watanuki	Ozawa	1:35
5.	"Akaku Atsui Kodō" (Instrumental)	Aiuchi; Watanuki	Ozawa	3:20

== Charts ==
Chart (2005)	Peak position
Japan (Oricon)	7

== Certification and sales ==
Region	Certification	Certified units/sales
Japan (RIAJ)	None	21,854

== Release history ==
Region	Date	Format	Catalogue Num.	Label	Ref.
Japan	4 May 2005	CD	GZCA-4038	Giza Studio	
