= Party Time Party Up =

2007 single by Rina Aiuchi

- Standard edition cover

Single by Rina Aiuchi

from the album Trip
- Released: December 19, 2007
- Genre: J-pop
- Length: 4:49
- Label: Giza Studio
- Songwriter(s): Rina Aiuchi; Akihito Tokunaga
- Producer(s): Rina Aiuchi; Kannonji

Rina Aiuchi singles chronology
"Mint" (2007)	"Nemurenu Yo ni" / "Party Time Party Up" (2007)	"I Believe You ~Ai no Hana~" (2008)

"Party Time Party Up" (stylized in all caps) is a song by Japanese singer-songwriter Rina Aiuchi. It was released on 19 December 2007 through Giza Studio, as a double A-side with "Nemurenu Yo ni" and the third single from her sixth studio album Trip. The single was released in the four editions: two standard editions and two limited editions. Following the release, the single peaked at number eight in Japan and has sold over 18,413 copies nationwide.

== Track listing ==
CD single (Limited edition - Party Time Party Up/Nemurenu Yo ni)
No.	Title	Writer(s)	Arranger(s)	Length
1.	"Party Time Party Up"	Rina Aiuchi; Akihito Tokunaga	Yoshinobu Ohga	4:49
2.	"Nemurenu Yo ni"	Aiuchi; Koji Goto	Goto	5:32
3.	"Party Time Party Up" (Instrumental)	Aiuchi; Tokunaga	Ohga	4:50
4.	"Nemurenu Yo ni" (Instrumental)	Aiuchi; Goto	Goto	5:30

CD single (Limited edition - Party Time Party Up/Nemurenu Yo ni)
No.	Title	Writer(s)	Arranger(s)	Length
3.	"Party Time Party Up" (Command+s Mix)	Aiuchi; Tokunaga		4:49
4.	"Party Time Party Up" (Instrumental)	Aiuchi; Tokunaga	Ohga	4:50
5.	"Nemurenu Yo ni" (Instrumental)	Aiuchi; Goto	Goto	5:30

Limited edition bonus DVD (Party Time Party Up/Nemurenu Yo ni)
No.	Title	Writer(s)	Length
1.	"Party Time Party Up" (Live from Rina Matsuri 2007)	Aiuchi; Tokunaga

CD single (Limited edition - Nemurenu Yo ni/Party Time Party Up)
No.	Title	Writer(s)	Arranger(s)	Length
1.	"Nemurenu Yo ni"	Rina Aiuchi; Koji Goto	Goto	5:33
2.	"Party Time Party Up"	Aiuchi; Akihito Tokunaga	Yoshinobu Ohga	4:48
3.	"Nemurenu Yo ni" (Instrumental)	Aiuchi; Goto	Goto	5:33
4.	"Party Time Party Up" (Instrumental)	Aiuchi; Tokunaga	Ohga	4:47

CD single (Standard edition - Nemurenu Yo ni/Party Time Party Up)
No.	Title	Writer(s)	Arranger(s)	Length
3.	"Nemurenu Yo ni" (Lifeblood Mix)	Aiuchi; Goto		4:33
4.	"Nemurenu Yo ni" (Instrumental)	Aiuchi; Goto	Goto	5:33
5.	"Party Time Party Up" (Instrumental)	Aiuchi; Tokunaga	Ohga	4:47

Limited edition bonus DVD (Nemurenu Yo ni/Party Time Party Up)
No.	Title	Writer(s)	Length
1.	"Nemurenu Yo ni" (Live from Rina Matsuri 2007)	Aiuchi; Goto

== Charts ==
Chart (2007)	Peak position
Japan (Oricon)	8

== Certification and sales ==
Region	Certification	Certified units/sales
Japan (RIAJ)	None	18,413

== Release history ==
Region	Date	Format	Catalogue Num.	Label	Ref.
Japan	19 December 2007	CD	GZCA-7101	Giza Studio	
Japan	19 December 2007	CD	GZCA-7103	Giza Studio	
Japan	19 December 2007	CD+DVD	GZCA-7100	Giza Studio	
Japan	19 December 2007	CD+DVD	GZCA-7102	Giza Studio	
