= Hanabi (Rina Aiuchi song) =

2010 single by Rina Aiuchi

- Standard edition/digital download cover

Single by Rina Aiuchi

from the album Last Scene
- B-side: "Garden"
- Released: July 28, 2010
- Genre: J-pop
- Length: 3:33
- Label: Giza Studio
- Songwriter(s): Rina Aiuchi; Aika Ohno
- Producer(s): Rina Aiuchi; Kannonji

Rina Aiuchi singles chronology
| "C Love R" (2010) | "Hanabi" (2010) | "Warm Prayer" (2018) |

Music video
- "Hanabi" on YouTube

"Hanabi" is a song by Japanese singer-songwriter Rina Aiuchi. It was released on 28 July 2010 through Giza Studio, as the fourth single from her eighth studio album Last Scene. The single reached number twenty-eight in Japan and has sold over 6,152 copies nationwide. The song served as the theme music for the Japanese television show, Happy Music.

== Background ==
"Hanabi" became Aiuchi's last single under the name, since she announced her retirement from the music industry two days later of the release of the single. In April 2018, she released the first single under the name R, "Warm Prayer".

== Track listing ==
CD single
| No. | Title | Writer(s) | Arranger(s) | Length |
|---|---|---|---|---|
| 1. | "Hanabi" | Rina Aiuchi; Aika Ohno | Kentaro Ishii | 3:33 |
| 2. | "Garden" | Aiuchi; Tetsushi Hasegawa | Hasegawa | 5:13 |
| 3. | "Hanabi" (Instrumental) | Aiuchi; Ohno | Ishii | 3:35 |
| 4. | "Garden" (Instrumental) | Aiuchi; Hasegawa | Hasegawa | 5:10 |

Limited edition bonus DVD
| No. | Title | Writer(s) | Arranger(s) | Length |
|---|---|---|---|---|
| 1. | "Hanabi" (Music Clip) | Rina Aiuchi; Aika Ohno | Kentaro Ishii |

Digital download
| No. | Title | Writer(s) | Arranger(s) | Length |
|---|---|---|---|---|
| 1. | "Hanabi" | Rina Aiuchi; Aika Ohno | Kentaro Ishii | 3:33 |
| 2. | "Garden" | Aiuchi; Tetsushi Hasegawa | Hasegawa | 5:13 |

== Charts ==
| Chart (2010) | Peak position |
|---|---|
| Japan (Oricon) | 28 |

== Certification and sales ==
| Region | Certification | Certified units/sales |
|---|---|---|
| Japan (RIAJ) | None | 6,152 |

== Release history ==
| Region | Date | Format | Catalogue Num. | Label | Ref. |
|---|---|---|---|---|---|
| Japan | 28 July 2010 | CD | GZCA-7159 | Giza Studio | |
| Japan | 28 July 2010 | CD+DVD | GZCA-7158 | Giza Studio | |
| Japan | 28 July 2010 | Digital download | | Giza Studio | |
