= A.I.R. (Rina Aiuchi album) =

Studio album by Rina Aiuchi
- Released: 15 October 2003
- Recorded: 2002–2003
- Genre: J-pop
- Length: 69 minutes
- Label: Giza Studio
- Producer: Rina Aiuchi, Kanonji

Rina Aiuchi chronology
Power of Words (2002)	A.I.R. (2003)	Playgirl (2004)

Singles from A.I.R
- 1. "Sincerely Yours" Released: August 11, 2002; 2. "Deep Freeze" Released: November 20, 2002; 3. "Kaze no Nai Umi de Dakishimete" Released: January 15, 2003; 4. "Full Jump" Released: May 14, 2003; 5. "Over Shine" Released: July 30, 2003; 6. "Kūki" Released: October 15, 2003

A.I.R. is the third studio album by Japanese singer and songwriter Rina Aiuchi. It was released on October 15, 2003 through Giza Studio. The title of the album stands for Aiuchi Infinity Rina. The album consists of six previous released singles. The single Kuuki has received renewed version under title Album version. The album charted #1 rank in Oricon during its first week. It charted for nine weeks and sold a total of 182,477 copies.

== Track listing ==
All lyrics are written by Rina Aiuchi

No.	Title	Music	Arrangers	Length
1.	"∞ Infinity"	Terukado	corin.	5:04
2.	"Full Jump"	Terukado	Miwa Midori	4:17
3.	"Kūki -Album version-" (空気 -Album version-)	Terukado	Daisuke Ikeda	4:46
4.	"Sincerely Yours"	Kouji Gotou	Kuron Oshiro	4:40
5.	"Kaze no Nai Umi de Dakishimete" (風のない海で抱きしめて)	Terukado	Akira, Daisuke Ikeda	5:04
6.	"Over Shine"	Terukado	Akihito Tokunaga	4:16
7.	"No Needs"	Yuri Godai	Terukado	5:22
8.	"Deep Freeze"	Terukado	Akira	5:42
9.	"Double hearted"	Aika Ohno	Akira	5:08
10.	"Our sound"	corin.	corin.	4:11
11.	"Code Crush"	Yuri Godai	corin.	4:55
12.	"Profuse love"	Deron Reynolds	Buddhaphonic	5:21
13.	"Fortune"	Terukado	Satoru Kobayashi	5:06
14.	"ra Happy Luppy"	Terukado	corin.	4:17

== In media ==
- ∞ Infinity - ending theme for the Nihon TV program Sport Urugusu
- Full Jump - theme song for the Nihon TV baseball program THE BASEBALL 2003 World Cup
- Kuuki - ending theme for the Nihon TV program Angle☆Now!
- Sincerely Yours - insert song for the Fuji TV variety program The Letters ~Kazoku no Ai ni Arigatou~
- Kaze no nai Umi de Dakishimete - ending theme for the anime television series Tsuribaka Nisshi
- Over Shine - ending theme for the Nihon TV program Miyaku Yuuji no Doshirouto
- Deep Freeze - ending theme for the Yomiuri program Pro Doumyaku
- Code Crush - opening theme for the PlayStation 2 game Mega Man X7 as the Japanese Intro
