= Miracle (Rina Aiuchi song) =

2006 single by Rina Aiuchi

Single by Rina Aiuchi

from the album Delight
- B-side: "Especial Thanks"
- Released: May 3, 2006
- Genre: J-pop; anime song
- Length: 4:08
- Label: Giza Studio
- Songwriter(s): Rina Aiuchi; Aika Ohno
- Producer(s): Rina Aiuchi; Kannonji

Rina Aiuchi singles chronology
"Glorious" / "Precious Place" (2006)	"Miracle" (2006)	"100 mono Tobira" (2006)

"Miracle" is a song by Japanese singer-songwriter Rina Aiuchi. It was released on 3 May 2006 through Giza Studio, as the fourth single from her fifth studio album Delight. The single reached number eleven in Japan and has sold over 10,500 copies nationwide. The song served as the theme songs to the Japanese anime television series, MÄR Heaven.

== Track listing ==
CD single
No.	Title	Writer(s)	Arranger(s)	Length
1.	"Miracle"	Rina Aiuchi; Aika Ohno	Takeshi Hayama	4:08
2.	"Especial Thanks"	Aiuchi; Akihito Tokunaga	Taishi Koseki	4:20
3.	"Miracle" (Allegro Vivace. Mix)	Aiuchi; Ohno	Singo	4:12

== Charts ==
Chart (2006)	Peak position
Japan (Oricon)	11

== Certification and sales ==
Region	Certification	Certified units/sales
Japan (RIAJ)	None	10,500

== Release history ==
Region	Date	Format	Catalogue Num.	Label	Ref.
Japan	3 May 2006	CD	GZCA-7072	Giza Studio	
