= Ai no Kotoba =

2009 single by Rina Aiuchi

Single by Rina Aiuchi

from the album Thanx
- B-side: "Colorful; Fingers Crossed"
- Released: February 11, 2009
- Genre: J-pop
- Length: 4:58
- Label: Giza Studio
- Songwriter(s): Rina Aiuchi; Takahiro Hiraga
- Producer(s): Rina Aiuchi; Kannonji

Rina Aiuchi singles chronology
"Friend" / "Sugao no mama" (2008)	"Ai no Kotoba" (2009)	"Story" / "Summer Light" (2009)

"Ai no Kotoba" (アイノコトバ, lit. "Words of Love") is a song by Japanese singer-songwriter Rina Aiuchi. It was released on 11 February 2009 through Giza Studio, as the third single from her seventh studio album Thanx. The single reached number seventeen in Japan and has sold over 5,506 copies nationwide. The song served as the theme songs to the Japanese morning television shows, The Sunday Next and Joho Paradise.

== Track listing ==
CD single
No.	Title	Writer(s)	Arranger(s)	Length
1.	"Ai no Kotoba"	Rina Aiuchi; Takahiro Hiraga	Kenji Arai	4:58
2.	"Colorful"	Aiuchi; Koji Goto	Hiraga	4:12
3.	"Fingers Crossed"	Double S; Chiyako Ogawa; Yuichi Komori		4:34
4.	"Ai no Kotoba" (Instrumental)	Aiuchi; Hiraga	Arai	4:58
5.	"Colorful" (Instrumental)	Aiuchi; Goto	Hiraga	4:11

Digital download
No.	Title	Writer(s)	Arranger(s)	Length
1.	"Ai no Kotoba"	Rina Aiuchi; Takahiro Hiraga	Kenji Arai	4:59
2.	"Colorful"	Aiuchi; Koji Goto	Hiraga	4:13

== Charts ==
Chart (2009)	Peak position
Japan (Oricon)	17

== Certification and sales ==
Region	Certification	Certified units/sales
Japan (RIAJ)	None	5,506

== Release history ==
Region	Date	Format	Catalogue Num.	Label	Ref.
Japan	11 February 2009	CD	GZCA-4119	Giza Studio	
Japan	11 February 2009	Digital download		Giza Studio	
