= 100 mono Tobira =

2006 single by Rina Aiuchi and U-ka Saegusa

- Standard edition cover

Single by Rina Aiuchi and U-ka Saegusa

from the album U-ka saegusa IN db III
- B-side: "Nazo (Rearrange Version); Still for Your Love (Rearrange Version)"
- Released: June 14, 2006
- Genre: J-pop; anime song
- Length: 3:37
- Label: Giza Studio
- Songwriter(s): Rina Aiuchi; U-ka Saegusa; Katsuo Ōno
- Producer(s): Kannonji

Rina Aiuchi singles chronology
"Miracle" (2006)	"100 mono Tobira" (2006)	"Bara ga Saku Bara ga Chiru" (2007)

U-ka Saegusa singles chronology
"Fall in Love" (2006)	"100 mono Tobira" (2006)	"Everybody Jump" (2006)

"100 mono Tobira" (100もの扉, lit. "100 Doors") is a song by Japanese singer-songwriters Rina Aiuchi and U-ka Saegusa. It was released on 14 June 2006 through Giza Studio, for the soundtrack of the Japanese animated television series Case Closed, for which the singers formed a special duo, Rina Aiuchi & U-ka Saegusa. The single reached number eight in Japan and has sold over 29,975 copies nationwide. The Japanese idol group, Sparkling Point were credited as the backing vocals for the song.

== Track listing ==
CD single
No.	Title	Writer(s)	Arranger(s)	Length
1.	"100 mono Tobira"	Rina Aiuchi; U-ka Saegusa; Katsuo Ōno	Takeshi Hayama	3:37
2.	"Nazo" (Rearrange Version)	Miho Komatsu	Hayama	3:39
3.	"Still for Your Love" (Rearrange Version)	Makoto Miyoshi; Mami Miyoshi	Hayama	3:44
4.	"100 mono Tobira" (TV Version)	Aiuchi; Saegusa; Ōno	Hayama	2:01
5.	"100 mono Tobira" (Instrumental)	Aiuchi; Saegusa; Ōno	Hayama	3:37

Limited Edition Bonus DVD
No.	Title	Writer(s)	Length
1.	"100 mono Tobira" (Music video)	Rina Aiuchi; U-ka Saegusa; Katsuo Ōno
2.	"100 mono Tobira" (Live Clip from Thursday Live 06.3.23 @ Hills Pan Kojyo)	Aiuchi; Saegusa; Ōno

== Charts ==
Chart (2006)	Peak position
Japan (Oricon)	8

== Certification and sales ==
Region	Certification	Certified units/sales
Japan (RIAJ)	None	29,975

== Release history ==
Region	Date	Format	Catalogue Num.	Label	Ref.
Japan	14 June 2006	CD	GZCA-4071	Giza Studio	
Japan	14 June 2006	CD+DVD	GZCA-4070	Giza Studio	
