= Nemurenu Yo ni =

2007 single by Rina Aiuchi

- Standard edition cover

Single by Rina Aiuchi

from the album Trip
- Released: December 19, 2007
- Genre: J-pop
- Length: 5:33
- Label: Giza Studio
- Songwriter(s): Rina Aiuchi; Koji Goto
- Producer(s): Rina Aiuchi; Kannonji

Rina Aiuchi singles chronology
"Mint" (2007)	"Nemurenu Yo ni" / "Party Time Party Up" (2007)	"I Believe You ~Ai no Hana~" (2008)

"Nemurenu Yo ni" (眠れぬ夜に, lit. "On a Sleepless Night") is a song by Japanese singer-songwriter Rina Aiuchi. It was released on 19 December 2007 through Giza Studio, as a double A-side with "Party Time Party Up" and the third single from her sixth studio album Trip. The single was released in the four editions: two standard editions and two limited editions. Following the release, the single peaked at number eight in Japan and has sold over 18,413 copies nationwide. The song served as the theme songs to the Japanese television show, Kami Summers.

== Track listing ==
CD single (Limited edition - Nemurenu Yo ni/Party Time Party Up)
No.	Title	Writer(s)	Arranger(s)	Length
1.	"Nemurenu Yo ni"	Rina Aiuchi; Koji Goto	Goto	5:33
2.	"Party Time Party Up"	Aiuchi; Akihito Tokunaga	Yoshinobu Ohga	4:48
3.	"Nemurenu Yo ni" (Instrumental)	Aiuchi; Goto	Goto	5:33
4.	"Party Time Party Up" (Instrumental)	Aiuchi; Tokunaga	Ohga	4:47

CD single (Standard edition - Nemurenu Yo ni/Party Time Party Up)
No.	Title	Writer(s)	Arranger(s)	Length
3.	"Nemurenu Yo ni" (Lifeblood Mix)	Aiuchi; Goto		4:33
4.	"Nemurenu Yo ni" (Instrumental)	Aiuchi; Goto	Goto	5:33
5.	"Party Time Party Up" (Instrumental)	Aiuchi; Tokunaga	Ohga	4:47

Limited edition bonus DVD (Nemurenu Yo ni/Party Time Party Up)
No.	Title	Writer(s)	Length
1.	"Nemurenu Yo ni" (Live from Rina Matsuri 2007)	Aiuchi; Goto

CD single (Limited edition - Party Time Party Up/Nemurenu Yo ni)
No.	Title	Writer(s)	Arranger(s)	Length
1.	"Party Time Party Up"	Aiuchi; Akihito Tokunaga	Yoshinobu Ohga	4:49
2.	"Nemurenu Yo ni"	Rina Aiuchi; Koji Goto	Goto	5:32
3.	"Party Time Party Up" (Instrumental)	Aiuchi; Tokunaga	Ohga	4:50
4.	"Nemurenu Yo ni" (Instrumental)	Aiuchi; Goto	Goto	5:30

CD single (Limited edition - Party Time Party Up/Nemurenu Yo ni)
No.	Title	Writer(s)	Arranger(s)	Length
3.	"Party Time Party Up" (Command+s Mix)	Aiuchi; Tokunaga		4:49
4.	"Party Time Party Up" (Instrumental)	Aiuchi; Tokunaga	Ohga	4:50
5.	"Nemurenu Yo ni" (Instrumental)	Aiuchi; Goto	Goto	5:30

Limited edition bonus DVD (Party Time Party Up/Nemurenu Yo ni)
No.	Title	Writer(s)	Length
1.	"Party Time Party Up" (Live from Rina Matsuri 2007)	Aiuchi; Tokunaga

== Charts ==
Chart (2007)	Peak position
Japan (Oricon)	8

== Certification and sales ==
Region	Certification	Certified units/sales
Japan (RIAJ)	None	18,413

== Release history ==
Region	Date	Format	Catalogue Num.	Label	Ref.
Japan	19 December 2007	CD	GZCA-7101	Giza Studio	
Japan	19 December 2007	CD	GZCA-7103	Giza Studio	
Japan	19 December 2007	CD+DVD	GZCA-7100	Giza Studio	
Japan	19 December 2007	CD+DVD	GZCA-7102	Giza Studio	
