= Friend/Sugao no mama =

2008 single by Rina Aiuchi

- Standard edition B/Digital download cover

Single by Rina Aiuchi

from the album Thanx
- Released: December 17, 2008
- Genre: J-pop
- Length: 5:23; 4:59
- Label: Giza Studio
- Songwriter(s): Rina Aiuchi; Tomohiro Sudo; Masazumi Ozawa
- Producer(s): Rina Aiuchi; Kannonji

Rina Aiuchi singles chronology
"I Believe You ~Ai no Hana~" (2008)	"Friend/Sugao no mama" (2008)	"Ai no Kotoba" (2009)

"Friend"/"Sugao no mama" (Friend/素顔のまま, lit. "Friend/The Way I Am") is a single by Japanese singer-songwriter Rina Aiuchi. It was released on 17 December 2008 through Giza Studio, as the second single from her seventh studio album Thanx. The double A-side single reached number eight in Japan and has sold over 12,383 copies nationwide. "Friend" served as the theme song for the Japanese television show Ongaku Senshi ~Music Fighter~.

== Track listing ==
CD single (Limited edition)
No.	Title	Writer(s)	Arranger(s)	Length
1.	"Friend"	Rina Aiuchi; Tomohiro Sudo	Kenji Arai	5:23
2.	"Sugao no mama"	Aiuchi; Masazumi Ozawa	Ozawa	4:59
3.	"Friend" (Instrumental)	Aiuchi; Sudo	Arai	5:25
4.	"Sugao no mama" (Instrumental)	Aiuchi; Ozawa	Ozawa	4:55

Limited edition bonus DVD
No.	Title	Writer(s)	Length
1.	"Friend" (Music Clip Special Edition)	Rina Aiuchi; Tomohiro Sudo

CD single (Standard edition A)
No.	Title	Writer(s)	Arranger(s)	Length
3.	"Today Is the Day"	Double S; Osamu Iwasaki; Yuichi Komori	Komori	3:32
4.	"Friend" (Instrumental)	Aiuchi; Sudo	Arai	5:25
5.	"Sugao no mama" (Instrumental)	Aiuchi; Ozawa	Ozawa	4:55

CD single (Standard edition B)
No.	Title	Writer(s)	Arranger(s)	Length
3.	"Negai ga Kanaunara"	Aiuhi; Shinji Tamura	Takeshi Hayama	5:01
4.	"Friend" (Instrumental)	Aiuchi; Sudo	Arai	5:25
5.	"Sugao no mama" (Instrumental)	Aiuchi; Ozawa	Ozawa	4:55

Digital download
No.	Title	Writer(s)	Arranger(s)	Length
1.	"Friend"	Rina Aiuchi; Tomohiro Sudo	Kenji Arai	5:23
2.	"Sugao no mama"	Aiuchi; Masazumi Ozawa	Ozawa	4:58
3.	"Negai ga Kanaunara"	Aiuhi; Shinji Tamura	Takeshi Hayama	5:01

== Charts ==
Chart (2006)	Peak position
Japan (Oricon)	5

== Certification and sales ==
Region	Certification	Certified units/sales
Japan (RIAJ)	None	12,383

== Release history ==
Region	Date	Format	Catalogue Num.	Label	Ref.
Japan	29 March 2006	CD+DVD (Limited edition)	GZCA-7134	Giza Studio	
Japan	29 March 2006	CD (Standard edition A)	GZCA-4117	Giza Studio	
Japan	29 March 2006	CD (Standard edition B)	GZCA-4118	Giza Studio	
Japan	29 March 2006	Digital download		Giza Studio	
