= Playgirl (album) =

Studio album by Rina Aiuchi
- Released: December 15, 2004
- Recorded: 2004
- Genre: J-pop
- Length: 54 minutes
- Label: Giza Studio
- Producer: Kanonji, Rina Aiuchi

Rina Aiuchi chronology
A.I.R (2003)	Playgirl (2004)	Delight (2006)

Singles from Playgirl
- 1. "Dream×Dream" Released: April 28, 2004; 2. "Start" Released: May 26, 2004; 3. "Boom-Boom-Boom" Released: October 20, 2004

Playgirl is the fourth studio album by Japanese singer and songwriter Rina Aiuchi. It was released on December 15, 2004, through Giza Studio. The album consists of three previous released singles, such as Dream×Dream, Start and Boom-Boom-Boom. The first press release included bonus track "DreamXDream-Love&Wishes Version-". The album charted at #7 on the Oricon charts in its first week. It charted for eight weeks.

== Track listing ==
All lyrics are written by Rina Aiuchi.

Playgirl
No.	Title	Music	Arrangers	Length
1.	"Playgirl"	Daria Kawashima	Kuuron Oshiro	4:40
2.	"Start"	Aika Ohno	corin.	3:15
3.	"Boom-Boom-Boom"	Aika Ohno	corin.	4:37
4.	"STEP UP!"	Aika Ohno	Masazumi Ozawa (ex.Pamelah)	4:32
5.	"CONTROL ME, RESCUE ME"	Masaaki Watanuki	Shinya Saitou	3:39
6.	"Wonderful Danger"	corin.	Akira	4:13
7.	"Love-formation"	Terukado	Ryou Hayashi (organs café)	5:10
8.	"Neverending Winter"	Daria Kawashima	MissTy	3:13
9.	"Dream×Dream"	Akihito Tokunaga (Doa)	corin.	4:19
10.	"Miss you"	Terukado	Hirohito Furui (Garnet Crow)	3:36
11.	"Seductive Medicine"	Yuuichirou Iwai (U-ka Saegusa in dB)	munetoshi	3:27
12.	"V.I.P"	Masaaki Watanuki	Masaaki Watanuki	3:27
13.	"Girls play"	Terukado	Ozawa	3:27

== In media ==
- Playgirl – theme song for Nihon TV program Motor Sports
- Start – opening theme for Anime television series Detective Conan
- Boom-Boom-Boom – ending theme for Nihon TV program Coming Doubt
  - opening theme for Nihon TV program Ongaku Senshu Music Fighter
- Step up! – opening theme for Nihon TV program Sports Uru Sugu
- Love-formation – theme song for MBS program Koshien Bowl
- DreamXDream – theme song for anime movie Detective Conan: Magician of the Silver Sky
