= Bara ga Saku Bara ga Chiru =

2007 single by Rina Aiuchi

Single by Rina Aiuchi

from the album Trip
- B-side: "Powder Snow"
- Released: January 1, 2007
- Genre: J-pop; anime song
- Length: 4:38
- Label: Giza Studio
- Songwriter(s): Rina Aiuchi; Hisanao Kojima
- Producer(s): Rina Aiuchi; Kannonji

Rina Aiuchi singles chronology
"100 mono Tobira" (2006)	"Bara ga Saku Bara ga Chiru" (2007)	"Nanatsu no Umi wo Wataru Kaze no yōni" (2007)

"Bara ga Saku Bara ga Chiru" (薔薇が咲く 薔薇が散る, lit. "Roses Blossom, Roses Fall") is a song by Japanese singer-songwriter Rina Aiuchi. It was released on 1 January 2007 through Giza Studio, as the lead single from her sixth studio album Trip. The single reached number fifteen in Japan and has sold over 15,732 copies nationwide. The song served as the theme songs to the Japanese anime television series, Fist of the Blue Sky.

== Track listing ==
CD single
No.	Title	Writer(s)	Arranger(s)	Length
1.	"Bara ga Saku Bara ga Chiru"	Rina Aiuchi; Hisanao Kojima	Takeshi Hayama	4:38
2.	"Powder Snow"	Aiuchi; Kojima	Yuya Saka	5:39
3.	"Bara ga Saku Bara ga Chiru" (Sunbeam Rising Mix)	Aiuchi; Kojima	Yoshito. K	4:38
4.	"Bara ga Saku Bara ga Chiru" (Moonlit Rose Mix)	Aiuchi; Kojima	Singo	5:27
5.	"Bara ga Saku Bara ga Chiru" (Instrumental)	Aiuchi; Kojima	Hayama	4:37

== Charts ==
=== Weekly charts ===
Chart (2007)	Peak position
Japan (Oricon)	15

== Certification and sales ==
Region	Certification	Certified units/sales
Japan (RIAJ)	None	15,732

== Release history ==
Region	Date	Format	Catalogue Num.	Label	Ref.
Japan	1 January 2007	CD	GZCA-7082	Giza Studio	
