= I Believe You ~Ai no Hana~ =

2007 single by Rina Aiuchi

- Limited edition cover

Single by Rina Aiuchi

from the album Trip
- B-side: Hey! Harmony (Limited edition)
- Released: May 7, 2008
- Genre: J-pop
- Length: 5:05
- Label: Giza Studio
- Songwriter(s): Rina Aiuchi; Koji Goto
- Producer(s): Rina Aiuchi; Kannonji

Rina Aiuchi singles chronology
"Nemurenu Yo ni" / "Party Time Party Up" (2007)	"I Believe You ~Ai no Hana~" (2008)	"Kimi to no Deai ~Good Bye My Days~" (2007)

"I Believe You ~Ai no Hana~" (I believe you ～愛の花～; lit. "I Believe You ~Flower of Love~") is a song by Japanese singer-songwriter Rina Aiuchi. It was released on 7 May 2008 through Giza Studio, as the fourth single from her sixth studio album Trip. The single reached number seventeen in Japan and has sold over 8,303 copies nationwide. The song served as the theme songs to the Japanese television show, Koisuru Hanikami.

== Track listing ==
CD single (Standard edition)
No.	Title	Writer(s)	Arranger(s)	Length
1.	"I Believe You ~Ai no Hana~"	Rina Aiuchi; Koji Goto	Goto	5:05
2.	"Hey!"	Aiuchi; Bonn	Bonn	3:58
3.	"I Believe You ~Ai no Hana~" (Instrumental)	Aiuchi; Goto	Goto	5:07
4.	"Hey!" (Instrumental)	Aiuchi; Bonn	Bonn	3:56

CD single (Limited edition)
No.	Title	Writer(s)	Arranger(s)	Length
3.	"Harmony" (DTS Mix)	Double S; Kenji Arai		4:31
4.	"I Believe You ~Ai no Hana~" (Bouquet of Love version)	Aiuchi; Goto	Junichi Matsuda	5:22
5.	"I Believe You ~Ai no Hana~" (Instrumental)	Aiuchi; Goto	Goto	5:07
6.	"Hey!" (Instrumental)	Aiuchi; Bonn	Bonn	3:56

== Charts ==
Chart (2007)	Peak position
Japan (Oricon)	19

== Certification and sales ==
Region	Certification	Certified units/sales
Japan (RIAJ)	None	8,303

== Release history ==
Region	Date	Format	Catalogue Num.	Label	Ref.
Japan	7 May 2008	CD (Limited edition	GZCA-4103	Giza Studio	
Japan	7 May 2008	CD (Standard edition)	GZCA-7118	Giza Studio	
