= Kaze no Nai Umi de Dakishimete =

2003 single by Rina Aiuchi

Single by Rina Aiuchi

from the album A.I.R.
- B-side: "Little Grey Mermaid"
- Released: January 15, 2003
- Genre: J-pop
- Length: 5:03
- Label: Giza Studio
- Songwriter(s): Rina Aiuchi; Terukado
- Producer(s): Rina Aiuchi; Kannonji

Rina Aiuchi singles chronology
"Deep Freeze" (2002)	"Kaze no Nai Umi de Dakishimete" (2003)	"Full Jump" (2003)

"Kaze no Nai Umi de Dakishimete" (風のない海で抱きしめて, lit. "Hold Me by the Windless Sea") is a song by Japanese singer-songwriter Rina Aiuchi. It was released on 15 January 2003 through Giza Studio, as the third single from her third studio album A.I.R.. The song reached number three in Japan and has sold over 72,908 copies nationwide, as well as being certified gold by the Recording Industry Association of Japan (RIAJ). The song served as the theme song to the Japanese animated television series, Tsuribaka Nisshi.

== Track listing ==
CD single
No.	Title	Writer(s)	Arranger(s)	Length
1.	"Kaze no Nai Umi de Dakishimete"	Rina Aiuchi; Terukado	Daisuke Ikeda; Akira	5:03
2.	"Little Grey Mermaid"	Aiuchi; Deron Reynolds	Buddhaphonic	4:13
3.	"Kaze no Nai Umi de Dakishimete" (Instrumental)	Aiuchi; Terukado	Ikeda; Akira	5:01

== Charts ==
Chart (2003)	Peak position
Japan (Oricon)	3

== Certification and sales ==
Region	Certification	Certified units/sales
Japan (RIAJ)	None	72,908

== Release history ==
Region	Date	Format	Catalogue Num.	Label	Ref.
Japan	15 January 2003	CD	GZCA-7010	Giza Studio	
