= Over Shine =

2003 single by Rina Aiuchi

Single by Rina Aiuchi

from the album A.I.R.
- B-side: "Code Crush; Ruby Stars"
- Released: July 30, 2003
- Genre: J-pop
- Length: 4:21
- Label: Giza Studio
- Songwriters: Rina Aiuchi; Terukado
- Producers: Rina Aiuchi; Kannonji

Rina Aiuchi singles chronology
"Full Jump" (2003)	"Over Shine" (2003)	"Kūki" (2003)

"Over Shine" is a song by Japanese singer-songwriter Rina Aiuchi. It was released on 30 July 2003 through Giza Studio, as the fifth single from her third studio album A.I.R.. The song reached number six in Japan and has sold over 46,206 copies nationwide. The song served as the theme song to the Japanese television shows, Yuji Miyake no Doshiroto and Ax Music-TV. The B-side track, Code Crush, serves as the opening theme song to the PlayStation 2 video game, Mega Man X7.

== Track listing ==
CD single
No.	Title	Writer(s)	Arranger(s)	Length
1.	"Over Shine"	Rina Aiuchi; Terukado	Akihito Tokunaga	4:21
2.	"Code Crush"	Aiuchi; Yuri Godai	Corin.	4:58
3.	"Ruby Stars"	Aiuchi; Godai	Corin.	4:52
4.	"Over Shine" (Instrumental)	Aiuchi; Terukado	Tokunaga	4:21
5.	"Code Crush" (Instrumental)	Aiuchi; Godai	Corin.	4:59
6.	"Ruby Stars" (Instrumental)	Aiuchi; Godai	Corin.	4:48

== Charts ==
Chart (2003)	Peak position
Japan (Oricon)	6

== Certification and sales ==
Region	Certification	Certified units/sales
Japan (RIAJ)	None	46,206

== Release history ==
Region	Date	Format	Catalogue Num.	Label	Ref.
Japan	30 July 2003	CD	GZCA-7026	Giza Studio	
