= Mint (Rina Aiuchi song) =

2007 single by Rina Aiuchi

Single by Rina Aiuchi

from the album Trip
- B-side: "Yellow Carpet"
- Released: August 15, 2007
- Genre: J-pop
- Length: 4:58
- Label: Giza Studio
- Songwriter(s): Rina Aiuchi; Taishi Senda
- Producer(s): Rina Aiuchi; Kannonji

Rina Aiuchi singles chronology
| "Nanatsu no Umi wo Wataru Kaze no yōni" (2007) | "Mint" (2007) | "Nemurenu Yo ni" / "Party Time Party Up" (2007) |

"Mint" is a song by Japanese singer-songwriter Rina Aiuchi. It was released on 15 August 2007 through Giza Studio, as the second single from her sixth studio album Trip. The single reached number nineteen in Japan and has sold over 8,995 copies nationwide. The song served as the theme songs to the Japanese television shows, Super Chanpurū and Mu-Gen ~Music Generations~.

== Track listing ==
CD single
| No. | Title | Writer(s) | Arranger(s) | Length |
|---|---|---|---|---|
| 1. | "Mint" | Rina Aiuchi; Taishi Senda | Senda | 4:58 |
| 2. | "Yellow Carpet" | Aiuchi; Takahiro Hiraga | Hiraga | 4:38 |
| 3. | "Mint" (Japanative Cruise Mix) | Aiuchi; Senda | | 7:41 |
| 4. | "Mint" (Instrumental) | Aiuchi; Senda | Senda | 4:58 |
| 5. | "Yellow Carpet" (Instrumental) | Aiuchi; Hiraga | Hiraga | 4:36 |

== Charts ==
| Chart (2007) | Peak position |
|---|---|
| Japan (Oricon) | 19 |

== Certification and sales ==
| Region | Certification | Certified units/sales |
|---|---|---|
| Japan (RIAJ) | None | 8,995 |

== Release history ==
| Region | Date | Format | Catalogue Num. | Label | Ref. |
|---|---|---|---|---|---|
| Japan | 15 August 2007 | CD | GZCA-7094 | Giza Studio | |
