= Trip (Rina Aiuchi album) =

- Standard edition/digital download cover

Studio album by Rina Aiuchi
- Released: May 31, 2008
- Recorded: 2007–2008
- Genre: J-pop
- Length: 62 minutes
- Label: Giza Studio
- Producer: Rina Aiuchi

Rina Aiuchi chronology
Delight (2006)	Trip (2008)	Thanx (2009)

Singles from Trip
- 1. "Bara ga Saku Bara ga Chiru" Released: January 1, 2007; 2. "Mint" Released: August 15, 2007; 3. "Nemurenu Yo ni/Party Time Party Up" Released: December 19, 2007; 4. "I Believe You ~Ai no Hana~" Released: May 7, 2008

Trip is the sixth studio album by Japanese singer and songwriter Rina Aiuchi. It was released on May 31, 2008, through Giza Studio, almost two years after the fifth studio album Delight. This is the first album in which Rina is the main producer. The album consists of four previous released singles, such as Bara ga Saku Bara ga Chiru (薔薇が咲く 薔薇が散る), Mint, Nemurenu Yo ni/Party Time Party Up (眠れぬ夜に／PARTY TIME PARTY UP) and I believe you ~Ai no Hana~ (I believe you 〜愛の花〜). A special website was launched to promote the album which includes self liner notes and preview tracks.

This album is released in two formats: regular CD version (GZCA-5131) and limited CD+DVD version (GZCA-5130). In DVD are included clips and interview from "Rina Aiuchi R-Live vol.4".

The album charted at #10 on the Oricon charts in its first week. It charted for five weeks and sold more than 28,000 copies.

== Track listing ==
All lyrics are written by Rina Aiuchi.

Trip
No.	Title	Music	Arrangers	Length
1.	"Trip"	Kazuhito Tsukui	Junichi Matsuda	4:54
2.	"Harmony"	Kenji Arai	Kenji Arai	4:41
3.	"I Believe You ~Ai no Hana~" (I believe you 〜愛の花〜)	Kouji Gotou	Kouji Gotou	5:06
4.	"Mint"	Taishi Izumida	Taishi Izumida	5:00
5.	"Party Time Party Up"	Akihito Tokunaga (Doa)	Yoshinobu Ohga (OOM)	4:48
6.	"Creamy day"	Kenta Takamori	Kohei Fujiwara	3:57
7.	"Sakura Iro" (さくら色)	Masanori Kobayashi	Junichi Matsuda	5:15
8.	"Bara ga Saku Bara ga Chiru" (薔薇が咲く 薔薇が散る)	Hisao Kojima	Takeshi Hayama	4:37
9.	"Silent Motion"	corin.	corin.	4:32
10.	"Marguerite"	Carmine	Takahiro Hiraga	4:05
11.	"Secret Jasmine"	Jun Nakagura	Jun Nakagura	5:10
12.	"Nemurenu Yo ni" (眠れぬ夜に)	Kouji Gotou	Kouji Gotou	5:34
13.	"A Day Trip"	Hiroshi Imai	Hirohito Furui (Garnet Crow)	4:39

== In media ==
- Trip - theme song for Nihon TV program Shiodome Event Bu
- I believe you ~Ai no Hana~ - theme song for Tokyo Broadcasting System Television program Koisuru Hami Kami!
- Min - ending theme for Nihon TV program Super Chample
- Bara ga Saku Bara ga Chiru - opening theme for Anime television series Fist of the Blue Sky
- Nemureni Yoru ni - ending theme for Tokyo Broadcasting System Television program Kamisamaa~zu
