= Dream×Dream =

2004 single by Rina Aiuchi

Single by Rina Aiuchi

from the album Playgirl
- B-side: "Sweet Peach Tree; Melody Flag"
- Released: April 28, 2004
- Genre: J-pop; anime song
- Length: 5:17
- Label: Giza Studio
- Songwriter(s): Rina Aiuchi; Akihito Tokunaga
- Producer(s): Rina Aiuchi; Kannonji

Rina Aiuchi singles chronology
"Kūki" (2003)	"Dream×Dream" (2004)	"Start" (2004)

"Dream×Dream" is a song by Japanese singer-songwriter Rina Aiuchi. It was released on 28 April 2004 through Giza Studio, as the lead single from her fourth studio album Playgirl. The song reached number six in Japan and has sold over 60,398 copies nationwide. The song served as the theme song to the Japanese animated film, Detective Conan: Magician of the Silver Sky.

== Track listing ==
CD single
No.	Title	Writer(s)	Arranger(s)	Length
1.	"Dream×Dream"	Rina Aiuchi; Akihito Tokunaga	Corin.	5:17
2.	"Sweet Peach Tree"	Aiuchi; Terukado	Midori Miwa	4:15
3.	"Melody Flag"	Corin.	Corin.	5:17
4.	"Dream×Dream" (Instrumental)	Aiuchi; Terukado	Tokunaga	5:14

== Charts ==
Chart (2004)	Peak position
Japan (Oricon)	6

== Certification and sales ==
Region	Certification	Certified units/sales
Japan (RIAJ)	None	60,398

== Release history ==
Region	Date	Format	Catalogue Num.	Label	Ref.
Japan	28 April 2004	CD	GZCA-7047	Giza Studio	
