= Run Up (Rina Aiuchi song) =

Single by Rina Aiuchi

from the album Power of Words
- B-side: "Rainbow"
- Released: June 27, 2001
- Recorded: 2001
- Genre: J-pop
- Length: 5:24
- Label: Giza Studio
- Songwriter(s): Rina Aiuchi; Aika Ohno
- Producer(s): Rina Aiuchi; Kannonji

Rina Aiuchi singles chronology
| "Faith" (2001) | "Run Up" (2001) | "Navy Blue" (2001) |

"Run Up" (stylized as "Run up") is a song by Japanese singer-songwriter Rina Aiuchi. It was released on 27 June 2001 through Giza Studio, as the second single from her second studio album Power of Words. The song served as the theme song to the Japanese television show Koko ga Hen da yo Nihonjin. The song reached number seven in Japan and has sold over 71,840 copies nationwide.

== Track listing ==
CD single
| No. | Title | Writer(s) | Arranger(s) | Length |
|---|---|---|---|---|
| 1. | "Run Up" | Rina Aiuchi; Aika Ohno | Midori Miwa | 5:24 |
| 2. | "Rainbow" | Aiuchi; Daria Kawashima | Kuuron Oshiro | 4:17 |
| 3. | "Run Up" (Global Trance Mix) | Aiuchi; Ohno | DJ Tokunaga | 5:30 |
| 4. | "Run Up" (Instrumental) | Aiuchi; Ohno | Miwa | 5:21 |

CD single (Limited edition)
| No. | Title | Writer(s) | Arranger(s) | Length |
|---|---|---|---|---|
| 4. | "Be Happy." (Grandale Euro Mix) | Rina Aiuchi; Mina Kaneko | KCP | 6:36 |
| 5. | "Run Up" (Instrumental) | Aiuchi; Ohno | Miwa | 5:21 |

12-inch single
| No. | Title | Writer(s) | Arranger(s) | Length |
|---|---|---|---|---|
| 1. | "Run Up" (Global Dance Mix) | Rina Aiuchi; Aika Ohno | DJ Tokunaga | 6:36 |
| 2. | "Run Up" (New Generation Euro Mix) | Aiuchi; Ohno | Never Generation | 5:12 |
| 3. | "Run Up" (New Generation Techno Mix) | Aiuchi; Ohno | Never Generation | 5:09 |

== Charts ==
| Chart (2001) | Peak position |
|---|---|
| Japan (Oricon) | 7 |

== Certification and sales ==
| Region | Certification | Certified units/sales |
|---|---|---|
| Japan (RIAJ) | None | 71,840 |

== Release history ==
| Region | Date | Format | Catalogue Num. | Label | Ref. |
|---|---|---|---|---|---|
| Japan | 27 June 2001 | CD | GZCA-1087 | Giza Studio | |
| Japan | 27 June 2001 | CD (Limited edition) | GZCA-1087A | Giza Studio | |
| Japan | 27 June 2001 | 12" | GZJI-010 | Giza Studio | |
