= Forever You ~Eien ni Kimi to~ =

2002 single by Rina Aiuchi

Single by Rina Aiuchi

from the album Power of Words
- B-side: "Rosemary"
- Released: February 14, 2002
- Recorded: 2001
- Genre: J-pop
- Length: 5:07
- Label: Giza Studio
- Songwriter(s): Rina Aiuchi; Aika Ohno
- Producer(s): Rina Aiuchi; Kannonji

Rina Aiuchi singles chronology
"Navy Blue" (2001)	"Forever You ~Eien ni Kimi to~" (2002)	"I Can't Stop My Love for You" (2002)

"Forever You ~Eien ni Kimi to~" (Forever You ～永遠に君と～) is a song by Japanese singer-songwriter Rina Aiuchi from her second studio album, Power of Words (2002). Aiuchi wrote the lyrics for the song whilst her frequent collaborator, Aika Ohno wrote the music and Akihito Tokunaga arranged the song. The song was released as a CD single by Giza Studio on 14 February 2002 as the fourth single from the album. A pop ballad J-pop song, it is recognized as a wedding song. The song reached number five in Japan and has sold over 70,590 copies nationwide.

== Track listing ==
CD single
No.	Title	Writer(s)	Arranger(s)	Length
1.	"Forever You ~Eien ni Kimi to~"	Rina Aiuchi; Aika Ohno	Akihito Tokunaga	5:07
2.	"Rosemary"	Aiuchi; Daria Kawashima	Kuuron Oshiro	3:30
3.	"Forever You ~Eien ni Kimi to~" (Jelly Wong Mata Leao Mix)	Aiuchi; Ohno	Jelly Wong; mAru	4:45
4.	"Forever You ~Eien ni Kimi to~" (Instrumental)	Aiuchi; Ohno	Tokunaga	5:03

== Charts ==
Chart (2002)	Peak position
Japan (Oricon)	5

== Certification and sales ==
Region	Certification	Certified units/sales
Japan (RIAJ)	None	70,590

== Release history ==
Region	Date	Format	Catalogue Num.	Label	Ref.
Japan	14 February 2002	CD	GZCA-2028	Giza Studio	
