= Power of Words =

Studio album by Rina Aiuchi
- Released: 15 May 2002
- Recorded: 2001–2002
- Genre: J-pop
- Length: 63:24
- Label: Giza Studio
- Producer: Rina Aiuchi; Kanonji

Rina Aiuchi chronology
Be Happy (2001)	Power of Words (2002)	A.I.R (2003)

Singles from Power of Words
- 1. "Faith" Released: 11 April 2001; 2. "Run Up" Released: 27 June 2001; 3. "Navy Blue" Released: 3 October 2001; 4. "Forever You ~Eien ni Kimi to~" Released: 14 February 2002; 5. "I Can't Stop My Love for You" Released: 10 April 2002; 6. "Can You Feel the Power of Words?" Released: 1 August 2002

Power of Words is the second album by the Japanese singer and songwriter Rina Aiuchi. It was released on 15 May 2002 by Giza Studio. Six singles have been released from the dance music-influenced J-pop album, including four top 5 singles in Japan: "Navy Blue", "Forever You: Eien ni Kimi to", "I Can't Stop My Love for You" and "Can You Feel the Power of Words?". The album topped the Oricon albums chart in its first week and remained for 13 weeks on the chart, making it Aiuchi's best-selling album.

In support of the album, Aiuchi embarked on the concert tour entitled Rina Aiuchi Live Tour 2002 "Power of Words" from May 2002.

== Track listing ==
All lyrics are written by Rina Aiuchi

No.	Title	Music	Arrangers	Length
1.	"Power of Words"	Chiyo Kyouka	KCP	4:57
2.	"I Can't Stop My Love for You"	Daria Kawashima	Kuron Oshiro	4:17
3.	"Navy Blue"	Kawashima	Miwa Midori	4:56
4.	"Forever You ~Eien ni Kimi to~" (Forever 〜永遠に君と〜)	Aika Ohno	Akihito Tokunaga	5:07
5.	"Pink baby's breath" (Album Mix)	Terukado	Hiroshi Terao	5:02
6.	"Be Distant"	Tokunaga	KCP	4:16
7.	"Wish"	Tokunaga	Oshiro	4:11
8.	"Painted Black"	Masataka Kitaura	Tokunaga	4:08
9.	"Faith"	Ohno	Oshiro	4:43
10.	"Spark"	Ohno	Yoshinobu Ohga	4:07
11.	"Crystal Pearl"	Kawashima	Masaaki Watanuki	4:01
12.	"Precious Pain"	Terukado	Coli Enter Rhythm	4:57
13.	"Run Up"	Ohno	Midori	5:24
14.	"Can You Feel the Power of Words?"	Ohno	Tokunaga	4:01

Notes

- Track 2 is stylised as "I can't stop my love for you♥".

== Use in their media ==
- "Faith" - theme song for Tokyo Broadcasting System Television program Wonderful
- "Run Up" - ending theme for Tokyo Broadcasting System Television program Koko ga Hen dayo Nihonjin
- "Navy Blue" - theme song for Tokyo Broadcasting System Television program Wonderful
- "Forever You ~Eien ni Kimi to~" - theme song for Fuji TV program Kandou Factory - Sport!
- "I can't stop my love for you♥" - opening theme for Anime television series Detective Conan
- "Can you feel the Power of Words?" - insert song for Fuji TV variety program The Letters ~Kazoku no Ai ni Arigatou~
- "Spark" - theme song for Nihon TV program Yakyuu World Cup 2002

== Cover version ==
The composer of "Forever You ~Eien ni Kimi to~", Aika Ohno covered this single in her cover album Silent Passage.
