= I Can't Stop My Love for You =

2002 single by Rina Aiuchi

Single by Rina Aiuchi

from the album Power of Words
- B-side: "Pink Baby's Breath"
- Released: April 10, 2002
- Genre: J-pop
- Length: 5:07
- Label: Giza Studio
- Songwriter(s): Rina Aiuchi; Daria Kawashima
- Producer(s): Rina Aiuchi; Kannonji

Rina Aiuchi singles chronology
"Forever You ~Eien ni Kimi to~" (2002)	"I Can't Stop My Love for You" (2002)	"Sincerely Yours" / "Can You Feel the Power of Words?" (2002)

"I Can't Stop My Love for You" (stylized as "I can't stop my love for you♥") is a song by Japanese singer-songwriter Rina Aiuchi. It was released on 10 April 2002 through Giza Studio, as the fifth single from her second studio album Power of Words. The song reached number two in Japan and has sold over 101,880 copies nationwide. The song served as the theme song to the Japanese animated television series, Case Closed.

== Track listing ==
CD single
No.	Title	Writer(s)	Arranger(s)	Length
1.	"I Can't Stop My Love for You"	Rina Aiuchi; Daria Kawashima	Kuuron Oshiro	4:20
2.	"Pink Baby's Breath"	Aiuchi; Terukado	Hiroshi Terao	5:07
3.	"I Can't Stop My Love for You" (Kenny's Sublimity Mix)	Aiuchi; Kawashima	Kenny	6:49
4.	"I Can't Stop My Love for You" (Instrumental)	Aiuchi; Kawashima	Oshiro	4:17

== Charts ==
Chart (2002)	Peak position
Japan (Oricon)	2

== Certification and sales ==
Region	Certification	Certified units/sales
Japan (RIAJ)	None	101,880

== Release history ==
Region	Date	Format	Catalogue Num.	Label	Ref.
Japan	10 April 2002	CD	GZCA-2033	Giza Studio	
