= Kūki =

2003 single by Rina Aiuchi

Single by Rina Aiuchi

from the album A.I.R.
- B-side: "Silver Hide and Seek"
- Released: October 15, 2003
- Genre: J-pop
- Length: 5:03
- Label: Giza Studio
- Songwriter(s): Rina Aiuchi; Terukado
- Producer(s): Rina Aiuchi; Kannonji

Rina Aiuchi singles chronology
"Over Shine" (2003)	"Kūki" (2003)	"Dream×Dream" (2004)

"Kūki" (空気, lit. "Air") is a song by Japanese singer-songwriter Rina Aiuchi. It was released on 15 October 2003 through Giza Studio, as the sixth single from her third studio album A.I.R., simultaneously with the album and the fan book, Made in Rina 2003. The song reached number seven in Japan and has sold over 27,264 copies nationwide. The song served as the theme song to the three Japanese television shows, Angura Now, √f and Tabi-Dachi!.

== Track listing ==
CD single
No.	Title	Writer(s)	Arranger(s)	Length
1.	"Kūki"	Rina Aiuchi; Terukado	DJ Me-Ya	5:03
2.	"Silver Hide and Seek"	Aiuchi; K's Letters	Yoshinobu Ohga	3:52
3.	"∞ Infinity" (Night Clubbers Mix)	Aiuchi; Terukado	Night Clubbers	5:49
4.	"Kūki" (Instrumental)	Aiuchi; Terukado	Tokunaga	5:03

Enhanced contents (Limited edition)
No.	Title	Writer(s)	Length
4.	"Kūki" (Music video)	Rina Aiuchi; Terukado
5.	"Video commentary"

== Charts ==
Chart (2003)	Peak position
Japan (Oricon)	7

== Certification and sales ==
Region	Certification	Certified units/sales
Japan (RIAJ)	None	27,264

== Release history ==
Region	Date	Format	Catalogue Num.	Label	Ref.
Japan	15 October 2003	CD	GZCA-7033	Giza Studio	
