= Faith (Rina Aiuchi song) =

Single by Rina Aiuchi

from the album Power of Words
- B-side: "Green Way"
- Released: April 11, 2001
- Recorded: 2001
- Genre: J-pop
- Length: 4:42
- Label: Giza Studio
- Songwriter(s): Rina Aiuchi; Aika Ohno
- Producer(s): Rina Aiuchi; Kannonji

Rina Aiuchi singles chronology
"Koi wa Thrill, Shock, Suspense" (2000)	"Faith" (2001)	"Run Up" (2001)

"Faith" (stylized as "FAITH") is the single by Japanese singer-songwriter Rina Aiuchi. It was released on 11 April 2001 through Giza Studio, as the lead single from her second studio album Power of Words. The song served as the theme song to the Japanese television show Wonderful. The song reached number eight in Japan and has sold 63,510 copies nationwide.

== Track listing ==
CD single
No.	Title	Writer(s)	Arranger(s)	Length
1.	"Faith"	Rina Aiuchi; Aika Ohno	Kūron Oshiro	4:42
2.	"Green Way"	Aiuchi; Akane Hosen	Oshiro	4:36
3.	"Faith" (KCP Mix)	Aiuchi; Ohno	KCP	4:50
4.	"Faith" (Instrumental)	Aiuchi; Ohno	Oshiro	4:41

12-inch single
No.	Title	Writer(s)	Arranger(s)	Length
1.	"Faith" (KCP Mix)	Rina Aiuchi; Aika Ohno	KCP	4:50
2.	"Be Happy." (Grandale Euro Mix)	Aiuchi; Mina Kaneko	KCP	4:08

== Charts ==
Chart (2001)	Peak position
Japan (Oricon)	8

== Certification and sales ==
Region	Certification	Certified units/sales
Japan (RIAJ)	None	63,510

== Release history ==
Region	Date	Format	Label	Ref.
Japan	4 April 2001	12-inch single	Tent House	
Japan	11 April 2001	CD single	Giza Studio	
