= Delight (album) =

Studio album by Rina Aiuchi
- Released: May 31, 2006
- Recorded: 2005–2006
- Genre: J-pop
- Length: 63:00
- Label: Giza Studio
- Producers: Kanonji, Rina Aiuchi

Rina Aiuchi chronology
Playgirl (2004)	Delight (2006)	Trip (2008)

Singles from Delight
- 1. "Akaku Atsui Kodō" Released: May 4, 2005; 2. "Orange Night" Released: November 2, 2005; 3. "Glorious" Released: March 29, 2006; 4. "Precious Place" Released: March 29, 2006; 5. "Miracle" Released: May 3, 2006

Delight is the fifth studio album by Japanese singer and songwriter Rina Aiuchi. It was released on May 31, 2006, through Giza Studio. The album consists of four previous released singles: "Akaku Atsui Kodou (赤く熱い鼓動)", "Orange★Night", "Glorious/Mind Place" and "Miracle". The "Orange★Night" single version is not included in this album, instead it has received new mix under title "La La La Lovin' you Mix". The album charted at #4 on the Oricon charts in its first week. It charted for seven weeks.

== Track listing ==
All lyrics are written by Rina Aiuchi.

Delight
No.	Title	Music	Arrangers	Length
1.	"Delight"	Aika Ohno	Junichi Matsuda, Maiko Iuchi	5:52
2.	"Glorious"	Aika Ohno	Takeshi Hayama	4:12
3.	"Precious Place"	Miho Komatsu	Tsukui Tadashi	4:17
4.	"Believe Your Bravery"	Yuuichirou Iwai (U-ka Saegusa in dB)	Shinya Saitou	4:06
5.	"Love or Be Loved"	Carmine	Saka Yuuya	5:08
6.	"Akaku Atsui Kodō" (赤く熱い鼓動)	Masaaki Watanuki	Masazumi Ozawa	3:22
7.	"Miracle"	Aika Ohno	Takeshi Hayama	4:11
8.	"Reason"	Tsukui Tadashi	Tsukui Tadashi	4:40
9.	"Shirushi" (しるし)	Jesse	Yuuya Saka	5:36
10.	"We♥Summer"	corin.	Kenji Arai	4:29
11.	"Morning Yell" (モーニングエール)	Tsukui Tadashi	Tsukui Tadashi	3:24
12.	"Orange★Night" (-La La La Lovin' you Mix-)	Mikiko Mizuno	corin.	3:46
13.	"Set You Free"	corin.	corin.	5:29
14.	"I'll Be Delighted"	Akihito Tokunaga (Doa)	Jun Nagakura	5:23

== In media ==
- Orange Night – ending theme for Anime television series Fighting Beauty Wulong
- Akaku Atsui Kodou – ending theme for Tokyo Broadcasting System Television program Ultraman Nexus
- Miracle – ending theme for Anime television series MÄR
- Glorious – opening theme for PlayStation 2 game Another Century's Episode 2
- Precious Place – ending theme for PlayStation 2 game Another Century's Episode 2
