= Thanx (Rina Aiuchi album) =

- Standard edition/digital download cover

Studio album by Rina Aiuchi
- Released: March 25, 2008
- Recorded: 2008–2009
- Genre: J-pop
- Length: 52:36
- Label: Giza Studio
- Producer: Rina Aiuchi

Rina Aiuchi chronology
Trip (2008)	Thanx (2008)	All Singles Best ~Thanx 10th Anniversary~ (2009)

Singles from Thanx
- 1. "Kimi to no Deai ~Good Bye My Days~" Released: October 15, 2008; 2. "Friend/Sugao no mama" Released: December 17, 2008; 3. "Ai no Kotoba" Released: February 11, 2009

Thanx is the seventh studio album by Japanese singer and songwriter Rina Aiuchi. It was released on March 25, 2009, through Giza Studio.

== Background ==
The album consists of three previous released singles, such as Kimi to no Deai ~good bye my days~ (君との出逢い ～good bye my days～), Friends/Sugao no mama (素顔のまま) and Ai no Kotoba (アイノコトバ).

A special website "Thanx 10th anniversary" was launched to promote album which includes self liner notes, message from Rina and preview tracks.

This album is released in three formats: regular CD version (GZCA-5182) and limited "A" CD+DVD version (GZCA-5180) and limited "B" CD+DVD version (GZCA-5181). In limited "A" version is included DVD is included medley clips from "Rina♥Matsuri 2008". In limited "B" version is included DVD with three music videoclips of singles which were included in this album.

== Chart performance ==
The album reached No. 12 on the Oricon charts in its first week. It charted for six weeks and sold more than 20,000 copies.

== Track listing ==
All lyrics are written by Rina Aiuchi

No.	Title	Music	Arrangers	Length
1.	"Thanx"	Daria Kawashima	Masazumi Ozawa (ex.Pamelah)	4:02
2.	"Sugao no mama" (素顔のまま)	Ozawa	Ozawa	4:55
3.	"Friend"	Tomoyuki Sudou	Kenji Arai	5:22
4.	"Mother"	Jun Shirataki	Arai	4:51
5.	"Ai no Kotoba" (アイノコトバ)	Takahiro Hiraga	Arai	4:55
6.	"Natsu no Maboroshi" (夏の幻)	Ryuhei Yamada	Hirohito Furui (Garnet Crow)	3:49
7.	"Kimi to no Deai ~Good Bye My Days~" (君との出逢い ～good bye my days～)	Hiraga	Arai	4:41
8.	"Melodies"	Hiya & Katsuma	Arai	3:58
9.	"Litte Star"	Soutarou Suzaki	bonn	3:39
10.	"Change"	Kouji Gotou	Kouji Gotou	4:52
11.	"Feel you"	Shika	Naguma	3:04
12.	"Thankful for the Birthday"	Hiroshi Imai	Arai	4:31

== In media ==
- Thanx - theme song for Nihon TV program NNN News Real Time (Real Sport)
- Friend - ending theme for Nihon TV program Ongaku Senshi Music Fighter
- Ai no Kotoba - ending theme for Nihon TV program The Sunday Next
- Kimi to Deai ~good bye my days~ - ending theme for Nihon TV program Nihonshi Suspense Gekijou
