= Last Scene (album) =

- Standard edition/digital download cover

Studio album by Rina Aiuchi
- Released: September 15, 2010
- Genre: J-pop
- Length: 60:26
- Label: Giza Studio
- Producer: Rina Aiuchi

Rina Aiuchi chronology
Thanx (2009)	Last Scene (2010)	Forever Songs ~Brand New Remixes~ (2011)

Singles from Last Scene
- 1. "Good Days" Released: 14 April 2010; 2. "Sing a Song" Released: 26 May 2010; 3. "Clover" Released: 23 June 2010; 4. "Hanabi" Released: 28 July 2010

Last Scene is the eighth studio album by Japanese singer and songwriter Rina Aiuchi, released on July 28, 2010 by Giza Studio. The album has yielded four singles, including a Japan top thirty hit single, "Hanabi". After the album release, she went into hiatus due to health issues.

The album reached number 8 on the Oricon weekly albums charts in its first week and charted for six weeks.

== Promotion ==
=== Singles ===
As a first part of the weekly project of releasing a song every week on the three consecutive weeks, "Good Days" was released as the lead single from the album on 14 April 2010. The released was followed by two other singles: "Sing a Song" and "C Love R".

"Hanabi" was released on 28 July 2010 as the fourth single of the album. The song served as the theme song to the Japanese television show Happy Music. The song reached number twenty-eight on the Oricon singles chart, selling approximately 6,152 copies nationwide. The single was a commercial failure, becoming Aiuchi's lowest-charting and least-selling single as of September 2018.

== Track listing ==
All lyrics are written by Rina Aiuchi

Last Scene track listing
No.	Title	Music	Arrangers	Length
1.	"Prologue"	Aika Ohno	Kentarou Ishii	2:46
2.	"Good Days"	Kouji Gotou	Ishii	3:59
3.	"Sing a Song"	Ohno	Takeshi Hayama	3:37
4.	"Merry Go Round"	Ishii	Hayama	3:48
5.	"Love Me"	Joe Min Sung; Shin Hwan Hee	Satoru Kobayashi	4:07
6.	"Time"	Ishii	Masazumi Ozawa	3:35
7.	"Priority"	Ishii	Hayama	4:41
8.	"Hanabi"	Ohno	Ishii	3:35
9.	"In My Shoes"	Takahiro Hiraga	Tetsushi Hasegawa	5:08
10.	"37°C"	Gotou	Ryuji Ibuki	4:21
11.	"Last Scene"	Silver Stream	Jinichi Tajiri	4:51
12.	"C Love R"	Ishii	Ishii	4:52
13.	"Epilogue" (Hidden track)	Ishii	Ishii	3:55

Limited edition bonus DVD
No.	Title	Length
1.	"Document of the Last Scene"

== Charts ==
Chart performance for Last Scene
Chart (2010)	Peak position
Japanese Albums (Oricon)	8

== Sales ==
Sales for Last Scene
Region	Certification	Certified units/sales
Japan (RIAJ)	None	20,672

== Release history ==
Release history and formats for Last Scene
Region	Date	Format	Label
Japan	15 September 2010	CD (Standard edition)	Giza Studio
Japan	15 September 2010	CD/DVD (Limited edition)	Giza Studio
Japan	15 September 2010	digital download	Giza Studio
