= Navy Blue (Rina Aiuchi song) =

Single by Rina Aiuchi

from the album Power of Words
- B-side: "Broken Heart"
- Released: October 3, 2001
- Recorded: 2001
- Genre: J-pop
- Length: 4:21
- Label: Giza Studio
- Songwriter(s): Rina Aiuchi; Daria Kawashima; Midori Miwa
- Producer(s): Rina Aiuchi; Kannonji

Rina Aiuchi singles chronology
"Run Up" (2001)	"Navy Blue" (2001)	"Forever You ~Eien ni Kimi to~" (2002)

"Navy Blue" is the single by Japanese singer-songwriter Rina Aiuchi. It was released on 3 October 2001 through Giza Studio, as the third single from her second studio album Power of Words. The song served as the theme song to the Japanese television show Wonderful. The song has sold 127,390 copies nationwide and remains as Aiuchi's best-selling single.

== Commercial performance ==
"Navy Blue" reached at number two on the Oricon Weekly Singles Chart, selling 127,390 physical copies.

== Track listing ==
No.	Title	Writer(s)	Arranger(s)	Length
1.	"Navy Blue"	Rina Aiuchi; Daria Kawashima	Midori Miwa	4:21
2.	"Broken Heart"	Aiuchi; Akihito Tokunaga	Miwa	4:42
3.	"Navy Blue" (Max Mazik Mix)	Aiuchi; Kawashima	Schweitzer
4.	"Navy Blue" (D'une Source Mix)	Aiuchi; Kawashima	Tokunaga
5.	"Navy Blue" (Instrumental)	Aiuchi; Kawashima	Miwa

== Charts ==
Chart (2001)	Peak position
Japan (Oricon)	2

== Certification and sales ==
Region	Certification	Certified units/sales
Japan (RIAJ)	None	127,390

== Release history ==
Region	Date	Format	Label
Japan	3 October 2001	CD single	Giza Studio
