= Full Jump =

Single by Rina Aiuchi

from the album A.I.R.
- B-side: "Himawari"
- Released: May 14, 2003
- Recorded: 2002
- Genre: J-pop
- Length: 4:18
- Label: Giza Studio
- Songwriters: Rina Aiuchi; Terukado
- Producers: Rina Aiuchi; Kannonji

Rina Aiuchi singles chronology
"Kaze no Nai Umi de Dakishimete" (2003)	"Full Jump" (2003)	"Over Shine" (2003)

"Full Jump" (stylized as "FULL JUMP") is a song by Japanese singer-songwriter Rina Aiuchi. It was released on 14 May 2003 through Giza Studio, as the fourth single from her third studio album A.I.R.. The song was performed at the 54th Kōhaku Uta Gassen. The song reached number three in Japan and has sold over 72,065 copies nationwide, as well as being certified gold by the Recording Industry Association of Japan.

== Track listing ==
CD single
No.	Title	Writer(s)	Arranger(s)	Length
1.	"Full Jump"	Rina Aiuchi; Terukado	Midori Miwa	4:18
2.	"Himawari"	Aiuchi; Akane Hosen	Orienta-Rhythm	4:34
3.	"Full Jump" (Full Throttle Mix)	Aiuchi; Terukado	Orienta-Rhythm	4:46
4.	"Full Jump" (Instrumental)	Aiuchi; Terukado	Miwa	4:16

== Charts ==
Chart (2003)	Peak position
Japan (Oricon)	3

== Certification and sales ==
Region	Certification	Certified units/sales
Japan (RIAJ)	Gold	72,065

== Release history ==
Region	Date	Format	Catalogue Num.	Label	Ref.
Japan	14 May 2003	CD	GZCA-7015	Giza Studio	
