= Start (Rina Aiuchi song) =

2004 single by Rina Aiuchi

Single by Rina Aiuchi

from the album Playgirl
- B-side: "Lavender Rain; Kira Kira"
- Released: May 26, 2004
- Genre: J-pop; anime song
- Length: 4:03
- Label: Giza Studio
- Songwriter(s): Rina Aiuchi; Aika Ohno
- Producer(s): Rina Aiuchi; Kannonji

Rina Aiuchi singles chronology
"Dream×Dream" (2004)	"Start" (2004)	"Boom-Boom-Boom" (2004)

"Start" (stylized as "START") is a song by Japanese singer-songwriter Rina Aiuchi. It was released on 26 May 2004 through Giza Studio, as the second single from her fourth studio album Playgirl. The song reached number eight in Japan and has sold over 42,833 copies nationwide. The song served as the theme song to the Japanese animated series, Case Closed.

== Track listing ==
CD single
No.	Title	Writer(s)	Arranger(s)	Length
1.	"Start"	Rina Aiuchi; Aika Ohno	Corin.	4:03
2.	"Lavender Rain"	Aiuchi; Terukado	Satoru Kobayashi	4:29
3.	"Kira Kira"	Corin.	Corin.	4:49
4.	"Start" (Instrumental)	Aiuchi; Ohno	Corin.	4:01

== Charts ==
Chart (2004)	Peak position
Japan (Oricon)	8

== Certification and sales ==
Region	Certification	Certified units/sales
Japan (RIAJ)	None	42,833

== Release history ==
Region	Date	Format	Catalogue Num.	Label	Ref.
Japan	26 May 2003	CD	GZCA-7048	Giza Studio	
