= Kūron Oshiro =

Japanese musical composer

Kūron Oshiro 尾城九龍
- Born: 7 December 1961 (age 64)
- Genres: Japanese pop
- Occupations: Composer and arranger
- Years active: 1997–present
- Label: GIZA Studio

Kūron Oshiro (尾城 九龍, Oshiro Kūron) (born 7 December 1961) is a Japanese musical composer and arranger. Oshiro currently works for Giza Studio composing and arranging music for artists such as Hayami Kishimoto, Miho Komatsu, Azumi Uehara, Rina Aiuchi, and Fayray.

Oshiro is also a lecturer for the online Oshiro Music School.
