= Rina Aiuchi =

Japanese singer

- 愛内 里菜
- Born: Rikako Kakiuchi (垣内 里佳子); 31 July 1980 (age 46); Higashiōsaka, Osaka, Japan
- Other names: Rika Kakiuchi; R
- Occupations: Singer; songwriter; businesswoman; fashion model; YouTuber
- Children: 1
- Musical career
- Genres: Japanese pop; dream trance; anime song
- Instruments: Vocals; keyboards
- Years active: 2000–2010; 2016–present
- Labels: Giza Studio; Running Rabbit
- Website: Official website

YouTube information
- Channel: 愛内里菜 オフィシャルチャンネル
- Years active: 2018–present
- Subscribers: 137 thousand
- Views: 25 million
- Last updated: 15 July 2024

Rikako Kakiuchi (垣内 里佳子, Kakiuchi Rikako; born 31 July 1980), professionally known by her stage name Rina Aiuchi (愛内 里菜) and formerly known as R, is a Japanese singer, songwriter, businesswoman, fashion model, and YouTube content creator. Born in Higashiōsaka, Japan, she won the first season of the audition Super Starlight Contest, winning a recording contract with Giza Studio. Her Eurobeat-influenced debut album, Be Happy (2001) was certified Gold in Japan and spawned a top-five single, "Koi wa Thrill, Shock, Suspense," which served as the theme song to the anime series Case Closed. Aiuchi's second album Power of Words became her best-selling album. It sold over 419,000 copies nationwide and was certified Platinum in Japan.

In 2010, Kakiuchi announced her retirement from music, founding a dog clothing brand named Bon Bon Copine in September 2012. She later resumed her musical activities, appearing on several television shows in 2015 and releasing the single "Warm Prayer" in 2018 under the new stage name, R.

== Early life ==
Kakiuchi was born on 31 July 1980, in Higashiōsaka, Osaka. She attended Tezukayama High School. In her high school years, Kakiuchi began working as a model, appearing on Cawaii!. In 1998, Kakiuchi attended Doshisha Women's College of Liberal Arts.

== Career ==
=== 1998–1999: Pre-debut period ===
In July 1998, Kakiuchi's cover of "Desperado" by Nathalie Aarts was released as a part of the Eurobeat compilation album Eurobeat Flash Vol.19, via Cutting Edge. In the spring of 1999, she won the first season of the talent search show Super Starlight Contest and received a recording contract with Giza Studio.

=== 2000–2002: Be Happy and Power of Words ===
In March 2000, Kakiuchi made her debut as Rina Aiuchi with her first single "Close to Your Heart," the theme song to the Japanese animated television series Monster Rancher. The single sold approximately 64,000 copies and peaked at number nineteen on the Oricon Weekly Singles Chart. Her second and third singles, "It's Crazy for You" and "Ohh! Paradise Taste!!" peaked in Japan at number sixteen and twenty-three, respectively. Her fourth single "Koi wa Thrill, Shock, Suspense" reached number five and sold over 100,000 copies. The song served as a theme song to the Japanese animated television series Case Closed. On 24 January 2001, Kakiuchi's debut album Be Happy was released. The Eurobeat-influenced J-pop album peaked at number three and was certified Gold in Japan. In support of the album, Aiuchi embarked on her first concert tour, Rina Aiuchi Club Circuit 2001 "Be Happy". In March 2001, Kakiuchi earned a Japan Gold Disc Award for New Artist of the Year.

In April 2001, "Faith" was released as the lead single from her second album, Power of Words . To promote the song, Kakiuchi appeared on several television music shows, including CDTV. The song reached number eight on the Oricon chart. Power of Words was released in May 2002. The album has spawned three top-five singles: "Forever You ~Eien ni Kimi to~," "I Can't Stop My Love for You," and "Navy Blue," which was released as the third single from the album in October 2001. The J-pop ballad peaked at number two in Japan and sold over 127,000 copies. As of November 2020, "Navy Blue" has remained Kakiuchi's best-selling song. Power of Words topped the Oricon chart and became certified Platinum by RIAJ. The album was her best-selling album as of September 2018, with sales of over 419,000 copies. On 16 June 2002, Kakiuchi begain the Rina Aiuchi Live Tour 2002 "Power of Words" in support of the album.

=== 2003–2004: A.I.R. and Playgirl ===
The double A-side single, "Sincerely Yours"/"Can You Feel the Power of Words?" was released in August 2002. The former was the lead single from Aiuchi's third album, AIR, while the latter was the sixth single from her second album, Power of Words. The single sold approximately 82,000 copies in Japan and was certified Gold by RIAJ, peaking at number four on the Oricon chart.

Aiuchi released her first remix album, Rina Aiuchi Remixes Cool City Production Vol.5, in July 2003. The album sold over 70,000 copies and reached number four on the Oricon chart. Aiuchi's third studio album, AIR was released on 15 October 2003, along with the single "Kūki". The album became Aiuchi's second number-one hit in Japan and was certified Gold by RIAJ. "Deep Freeze" was released in November 2002 as the second single from the album. The third single, "Kaze no nai Umi de Dakishimete," was also the theme song to the Japanese drama Tsuribaka Nisshi. The fourth single, "Full Jump," was a success, peaking at number three on the Oricon chart and becoming certified Gold by RIAJ.

Aiuchi began the concert tour Rina Aiuchi Live Tour 2003 "A.I.R." in November 2003, however, she struggled with aphonia during the show at Nakano Sun Plaza in Nakano Tokyo. In December 2003, Aiuchi's first compilation album Single Collection was released. The album reached number eight in Japan and was later certified Gold by RIAJ. On 31 December 2003, Aiuchi made her first appearance on Kōhaku Uta Gassen with "Full Jump".

The lead single from her fourth album, "Dream×Dream" was released in April 2004. The song was also the theme song to the Japanese animated movie Detective Conan: Magician of the Silver Sky and peaked at number sixth on the Oricon chart. Her fourth album, Playgirl, was released in December 2004. The R&B-influenced J-pop album peaked at number seven and sold 100,000 copies in Japan. The album has yielded three singles: "Dream×Dream," "Start," and "Boom-Boom-Boom."

=== 2005–2008: Delight and Trip ===
In May 2005, "Akaku Atsui Kodō" was released as the lead single from Aiuchi's fifth studio album. The song served as the theme song to the Japanese Tokusatsu series Ultraman Nexus and reached number seven on the Oricon chart. The double-A side single "Glorious"/"Precious Place" was released in March 2006 as the third single from the album. Both songs served the theme song to the PlayStation role-playing video game Another Century's Episode 2. The single peaked at number five and sold over 26,000 copies in Japan. Her fifth album Delight was released in May 2006. The dance music-tasted J-pop album was received well by her fans and reached number four in Japan. In support of the album, Aiuchi embarked on the concert tour Rina Aiuchi Live Tour 2006 "Delight" from 8 June 2006. In June 2006, Aiuchi released a collaboration single with U-ka Saegusa, "100 mono Tobira", under the name of Rina Aiuchi and U-ka Saegusa. The song was written for the Japanese television animated series Case Closed and sold approximately 30,000 copies in Japan. In addition to her work for Delight, Aiuchi appeared on the track "Ai Epilogue" on Tsunku's album Type 2.

In April 2007, the second single as Rina Aiuchi and U-ka Saegusa, "Nanatsu no Umi wo Wataru Kaze no yō ni" was released and sold over 36,500 copies in Japan. The song was written for the Japanese animated movie Detective Conan: Jolly Roger in the Deep Azure. Aiuchi's sixth studio album Trip was released in May 2008. The album yielded one top-ten single: "Nemurenu Yo ni"/"Party Time Party Up" and managed to enter top-ten in Japan.

=== 2009: Thanx and All Singles Best: Thanx 10th Anniversary ===
In March 2009, Aiuchi's seventh studio album Thanx was released. The album failed to enter top-ten in Japan and sold approximately 22,000 copies nationwide. The album has yielded one top-ten single: "Friend"/"Sugao no mama".

That July, Aiuchi released the double-A side single "Story"/"Summer Light". The single peaked at number nine on the Oricon chart and sold approximately 6,700 copies in Japan. The follow-up single, "Magic" was released in October of the same year. Although the song failed to enter the top-ten in Japan, the sales surpassed her last single, with total sales of 8,600 copies. Aiuchi's second compilation album All Singles Best: Thanx 10th Anniversary was released in December 2009. The album reached number seven on the Oricon chart and sold over 38,000 copies in Japan.

=== 2010–2011: Last Scene and retirement ===
In March 2010, Aiuchi released her first B-side tracks compilation album Colors. The album sold only 4,500 copies in Japan. On 30 July 2010, Aiuchi announced that she would retire from the music industry at the end of the year because of a thyroid deficiency. Her eighth and last studio album Last Scene was released in September 2010. The album debuted at number eight on the Oricon chart and sold approximately 20,600 copies in Japan. The album has yielded four singles: "Good Days", "Sing a Song", "C Love R", and "Hanabi". On 31 December 2010, Aiuchi's first box set Rina Aiuchi Premier Box 2000–2010 was released exclusively on her fan club and the web store of her label, Giza Studio. In September 2011, her second remix album Forever Songs: Brand New Remixes was released.

=== 2012–2018: Post-retirement and comeback ===
In September 2012, Aiuchi announced that she had founded a dog clothing company, Bon Bon Copine. Soon, she led the company to 50 million yen of yearly turnover.

In September 2015, Aiuchi appeared on the Japanese television music show, The Karaoke Battle and covered "Hello, Again (Mukashi Kara Aru Basho)" by My Little Lover and "Love Story" by Namie Amuro. In April 2018, Aiuchi released her first song since 2010, "Warm Prayer" under the name of R.

=== 2020-present: Legal disputes ===
In March 2021, Aiuchi accused her former producer of sexual harassment and filed a lawsuit against her former talent agent, Giza Artist, seeking 10 million yen, alleging that they did not protect her from the harassments.

Also in 2021, Aiuchi announced that she would resume the musical activities under her former stage name, Rina Aiuchi. "Rina Ai" was the stage name she adopted at the start of her career, and her contract with Giza had included the agency’s rights to this stage name in perpetuity. Aiuchi was served with an injunction from her former agency, blocking her from using the stage name. In December 2022, a judge At Tokyo District Court ruled in Aiuchi’s favour, allowing her to use the stage name.

On 13 October 2022, Osaka District Court dismissed Aiuchi's lawsuit, ruled that the harassment is not recognized; her appeal at Osaka High Court rejected on 21 April 2023, ruled that her sexual harassment claim is not credible.

== Discography ==
- Be Happy (2001)
- Power of Words (2002)
- A.I.R. (2003)
- Playgirl (2004)
- Delight (2006)
- Trip (2008)
- Thanx (2009)
- Last Scene (2010)
- Ring (2020, as R)
- Ever Joyful (2026)

== Filmography ==
Theatre
Year	Title	Role
2006	Tick, Tick... Boom!	Susan

== Awards and nominations ==
Year	Award	Category	Work	Result	Ref.
2001	Japan Gold Disc Award 2001	New Artist of the Year	Herself	Won	
