= List of minor characters in Kalyeserye =

This is a list of minor characters of a soap opera parody Kalyeserye, which were aired live within the "Juan for All, All for Juan" segment of the Filipino noontime variety show Eat Bulaga! on GMA Network.

== List of minor characters ==
- Doña Celia
Portrayed by: Celia Rodriguez
Doña Celia Rodriguez Viuda de Ungasis is the aunt of Alden and rival of Lola Nidora,^{Day 11} but were later reconciled after Nidora invited her to judge in the Lola's Playlist segment.
- Lolo Franing
Portrayed by: Jose Manalo
Don Francisco "Franing" Arenolli is Frankie's father. He is also a childhood friend of Lola Nidora.^{Day 26} His nickname, "Franing" is derived from the Filipino term "praning" meaning "paranoid" or "crazy".
- Dr. Tan-Ning
Portrayed by: Mark Elardo McMahon
Dr. Tan Ning is one of Lola Nidora's attending physicians. During the Yakie wedding, he claims that Lola Nidora is dying, after being paid off by Nidora.^{Day 31} Tan Ning alludes to the Filipino word "taning" (ultimatum).
- Wedding Singer/s
Portrayed by: Renz Verano and Jay Durias
They are the wedding singers during the first (Verano) and second (Durias) YaKie wedding.
- Pastor M. Postor
Pastor M. Postor is a fake pastor hired by Lola Nidora to officiate the wedding of Frankie and Yaya Dub. He was later arrested at the end of the wedding ceremony.
- Mystery Caller
The unknown individual who steals Lola Nidora's Book of Secrets and is asking Php 50,000,000.00 as ransom. He also does a Babalu voice like Nidora.
- Barbara Sastre
Portrayed by: Brian "Oreo" Fruyoc
Barbara Sastre is a gown designer and events planner hired to organize Frankie and Yaya Dub's wedding.^{Day 19} Barbara Sastre's actor is also part of production team of Eat Bulaga!. The surname is lifted from the Filipino masculine form of garments maker (feminine is "modista").
- Julia
Portrayed by: Julia Clarete
Julia is one of the Eat Bulaga! host who temporarily appears on barangay during YaKie's second wedding since Manalo cannot do it while in character.
- Fake Isadora
Portrayed by: Maine Mendoza
A woman who claims herself to be Isadora, known as "Mommy Dub" by Alden. She communicates using Dubsmash lines and does the "pabebe wave" just like Yaya Dub. However, Lola Nidora drives her away, claiming that she is just an impostor.^{Day 41}
- Bill
Portrayed by: Miguel Faustmann
Bill is the ex-boyfriend of Tinidora of 90 years who tricked her into marrying a cactus. He later arrives and asks Tinidora to forgive him but she declines his apology.^{Day 66}
- Vico
Portrayed by: Vico Sotto
Vico is Vic Sotto's real-life son who also happens to be a resident of one of the barangays that they visited. Lola Tinidora invited him to meet her sisters and Yaya Dub, whom he told is beautiful which made Alden jealous.
- Doña Paquita Beveliana Zobeyala / Tiya Bebeng
Portrayed by: Gloria Romero
Tiya Bebeng is the conservative but caring aunt of the Zobeyala siblings who reveals to have taken care of the triplets before. Nidora assures everyone early on that Tiya Bebeng will take care of Yaya Dub when Isadora would plan to get Yaya Dub back from them. Tiya Bebeng visited her nieces and Yaya Dub later on and eventually, met Alden. Even though she's a conservative person, she favors Alden for Yaya Dub.
- Ursula Palais Smash
Portrayed by: Maine Mendoza
Ursula is the real daughter of Isadora and mother of Yaya Dub who died of child birth while giving birth to Yaya Dub.
- Antonio Palais
Antonio was the real husband of Isadora, biological father of Ursula and grandfather of Yaya Dub. According to Nidora, Antonio was a painter working for Nidora 's family mansion. Tinidora jokingly teases about his name, being named after director Antonio "Tony" Tuviera.
- Michelle / White Lady
Michelle is the caretaker of the Zobeyala sisters' ancestral mansion where the ring mentioned in the diary was retrieved. Her appearance is similar to a white lady. In the next episode, she followed the Zobeyala sisters. She is revealed to be Tidora's high school classmate named Michelle.
- Tiya Kakang
Tiya Kakang is the messenger of Tiya Bebeng.^{Day 96} She was sent to deliver a letter from Tiya Bebeng to Nidora. She uses a live Dubsmash to communicate but is like an asynchronous satellite telecast. She is a pun of singer Chaka Khan.
- Zigue, Zigue, and Zputnik
The three males are Lola Babah's personal bodyguards, just like Nidora's "Rogelios", Tidora's "Bernardos" and Tinidora's "Quandos". Their outfits are matching black suits, slacks and white undershirts and have messy and outrageous hairstyles. Their name is based on British new wave band Sigue Sigue Sputnik and also from a famous gang in the Philippines.
- Kumareng Helen
Portrayed by: Helen Gamboa
Kumareng Helen is a special friend of the Zobeyala-De Explorer Sisters who is known as a very good cook.^{Day 105} She is also Yaya Dub's godmother (ninang) and is having an appearance on Lola Nidora's 90th birthday. The "kumare" on her character's name is a Filipino word used on calling close female friends, and the exact equivalent of the Spanish/Portuguese word "amiga". Gamboa is actually Tito Sotto's wife in real-life.
- Don Eduardo Rockefeller
Portrayed by: Eddie Garcia
Don Eduardo is Lola Babah's brother and also Alden's grandfather.^{Day 105} He also appeared on Lola Nidora's 90th birthday as a special guest.
- Don Babancho Lucas "Babalu" de Faulkerson
Don Babancho husband of Lola Babah and grandfather of Alden. The first two syllables of his first name and the first syllable of his second name, when combined, forms the name "Babalu" which is an obvious reference to the late Filipino actor/comedian Babalu.
- Don Miguel de Explorer
Portrayed by: Wally Bayola (shown only in picture)
Don Miguel was the husband of Lola Nidora and the grandfather of Doktora and DuhRizz. According to Lola Nidora, Miguel had succeeded the challenges from Nidora's mother before he and Nidora had married.
- Vladi Mir
Vladi Mir is one of the Barangay residents who volunteered to be Cindy's Filipino translator.
- Lola Babah's Maids
Portrayed by: The EB Babes
They are the maids of Lola Babah in her mansion. Lola Babah sometimes talk to them.
- Tetano
Tetano is Alden's personal assistant who brought a gift from Alden to Yaya Dub.
- Charmaine
Charmaine is the given alias to a 1-year old Barangay resident who acted as Alden and Maine's daughter when they demonstrated how their family life would look like.
- Brgy. Chairman
Portrayed by: Tito Sotto
He is the fictional Barangay Chairman of Brgy. Lorega, San Miguel, Cebu where Dodong was used to live.
Teodoro Smash / Dodong / Daddy Dod
Portrayed by: Vic Sotto
Dodong was the former gardener of the Zobeyala family and the father of Yaya Dub, who was allegedly addicted to drugs and the one who impregnated Ursula, Isadora and Antonio's daughter. Like his daughter, he uses Dubsmash as well. His appearance is of a rapper. Dodong finally meets his daughter after many years and eventually reconciles with Lola Nidora as well.^{Day 135} He is initially against Alden at first but eventually welcomes him. It is revealed that Dodong has married another wife Caitlyn/Dudang who became Yaya Dub's stepmother.
Kunehos
They are Dodong's backup dancers and true dancers like Tinidora's Quandos. Their outfit is like of the outfit of the dancers.
Santa Baes
Portrayed by: Joel Palencia, Kim Last, Kenneth Medrano and Jon Timmons
Santa Baes are the contestant of Christmas Caroling Competition to loose Yaya Dub and the Zobeyala sisters for House and Lot.
Paranque Rebels
Paranque Rebels are the contestant of Christmas Caroling Competition to win a champion for House and Lot.
Tita Geleen
Portrayed by: Geleen Eugenio
Tita Geleen is a dance instructor and Nidora's friend who teaches Lola Nidora, her sisters and Yaya Dub the dance skills for their choir competition. Tidora had once teased her sister Tinidora as "Tita Geleen" for their facial similarities, eventually both Tinidora and Geleen meet each other face-to-face and have a dance showdown.
Mr. Pogi "Richard Faulkerson"
Portrayed by: Jose Manalo
This certain "Richard Faulkerson" in a tribal clothes, claiming to be "Mr. Pogi", surprises Alden during his birthday.
Ruben
Ruben is a singer and one of the contestants of Sfrankiefy contest. He is the first talent of Lola Tidora and Lola Tinidora's talent agency, Pasisikatin Kita Agency (PKA). He escorts the next batch of contestants in the next episodes.
Jake No. 1
Yaya Dub's hyperactive classmate in Business class that moves like a pep squad member. He is the "Jake" who calls Yaya Dub that makes her smile because he mimics Alden's voice.
Jake No. 2 (Jake Ejercito)
Portrayed by: Jake Ejercito
Jake is Yaya Dub's handsome and smart classmate in Marketing class that made Alden jealous.^{Day 148} He is the "Jake" who calls Yaya Dub about a class report. When Alden finally meets Jake, they become friends.
Mrs. Martinez
Portrayed by: Merlyn Martinez
Mrs. Martinez is one of the Barangay residents who owns a rice mill. She gave to each of the Zobeyala sisters half ark of an expensive rice which made Lola Tinidora very happy and grateful.
Steve Havey
Portrayed by: Wally Bayola
Steve Havey is one of the announcers of Miss Barangay 2016 who repeats the results from Barbara Sastre. He slightly does the voice of Lola Nidora onscreen to communicate, making it like being "possessed" by her. Parody of controversial Miss Universe 2015 host Steve Harvey.
Alberto, Antonio and Ferdinand
Portrayed by: Wally Bayola (shown only in picture)
They were Lola Nidora's former suitors. They are based on Albert Einstein, Antonio Luna and Ferdinand Magellan.
Pedring
Pedring was Doña Ariana's driver.
Basilio and Crispin
Basilio and Crispin were Doña Ariana's bodyguards. Their appearances are similar to the Rogelios. Their names are based on Basilio and Crispin, Sisa's sons from Jose Rizal's novel Noli Me Tangere.
Dra. Lydia Pingping
Portrayed by: Ruby Rodriguez
Dra. Lydia was the head doctor during 1945 who told Anselmo that he had a brain tumor.
Brain Surgeon
Portrayed by: Sebastian "Baste" Benedict
This little brain surgeon during 1945 was the one who took care of Anselmo in the hospital and also assisted Dra. Lydia. He is said to be a neurosurgeon or a doctor who specializes in brain. He also sports Anselmo's hairstyle.
Camilo
Portrayed by: Kim Last
Camilo was Anselmo's friend who was the celebrant of the birthday party where they danced boojie (boogie) together.
Pepito
Portrayed by: Kenneth Medrano
Pepito is the cousin of Anselmo who is also his neighbor. He gave his mother's gift to Anselmo which is a bottle of milk and invited him for lunch. He also accompanied Anselmo during his operation.
Direk Soxie
Portrayed by: Soxie Topacio
Direk Soxie is a director looking for actors to star in his upcoming soap opera project.
Melanie
Portrayed by: Melanie Marquez
Melanie is a friend of Lola Nidora who trains Yaya Dub in modeling.
The Models
Portrayed by: The EB Babes, Aicelle Santos, Patricia Tumulak, Pia Guanio and That's My Baes
They are models performed in Yaya Dub's Fashion Show.^{Day 190}
Dawin
Portrayed by: Dawin
Dawin is the singer of Lola Nidora's theme song Dessert. He visited the Dabarkads at the studio and performed a dance showdown with Lola Nidora in a split-screen.^{Day 191}
Jomari
Jomari is a friend of Daddy Dod from the drug rehabilitation center. He is a character reserved by the cast for Joey de Leon.
Foreignoys
They are Caitlyn's bodyguards/aides.
Doro
Doro is Doktora's boyfriend from South Africa.
Kit Marikit / Yaya In
Portrayed by: Kitkat
Yaya In is one of the applicants who auditioned as a kasambahay for Lola Nidora's Mansion.^{Day 209} Lola Tinidora noticed that she has a mannerism of being talkative.
Yaya Glo / Gluta
Portrayed by: Ann "Hopia" Boleche
Yaya Glo is a granddaughter of Yaya Mot who applied as a kasambahay for Lola Nidora's Mansion.^{Day 210} Later, she became stand-in when Alden and Yaya Dub are in Italy. Her mannerism is similar to her grandmother, however unlike her grandmother, she speaks English better which is much to Nidora's awe.
Yaya Git
Portrayed by: Petite
Yaya Git is one of the applicants and a former garbage collector who has difficulty raising both arms.^{Day 212}
Bea
Bea is Alden's mystery caller on his phone that made Yaya Dub jealous.
Direk Gina
Portrayed by: Gina Alajar
Direk Gina is the acting coach of Alden and Yaya Dub in their live acting workshop.
The Male Players
The Male Players are handsome that meet Yaya Dub and taking selfie to make Yaya Dub as an escort.
Teodoro de Explorer
Portrayed by: Wally Bayola
Teodoro is the son of Lola Nidora and father of DuhRizz.
Dorita de Explorer
Portrayed by: Wally Bayola
Dorita is the daughter of Lola Nidora and mother of Doktora who lives in Kazakhstan.
Selena, Taylor and Jessie
Portrayed by: Pauleen Luna, Pia Guanio and Patricia Tumulak
DuhRizz' best friends who are joined in segment Bulagaan, sometimes Duhrizz' fiancee Pepito makes jealous on them.^{Day 291}
Don Pepito Lavacara
Portrayed by Joey de Leon
Pepito is the fiance of DuhRizz who joined in the segment Bulagaan.
Snoopy, Stoopy, and Shamaw
Portrayed by Ryan Agoncillo, Jimmy Santos and Anjo Yllana
They are Pepito's bodyguards who joined in the segment Bulagaan.
Galunggong
Portrayed by Alden Richards
He temporarily replaces Ging ging in an episode where Maine was seen bleeding.
Baptismal Priest
Portrayed by Ces Aldaba
The priest who officiated the baptism of the AlDub twins.^{Day 400}
Charmaine Nidora Smash Faulkerson
Portrayed by Caprice Cayetano
"The Importunate Great-Granddaughter". An unfortunate but lovable granddaughter of the Lolas. Alden and Yaya Dub's daughter. in the Trip Ubusan: The Lolas vs. Zombies
Richard Nidoro Smash Faulkerson
Twin brother of charmaine Nidora Richards, Alden and Yaya Dub's Son, Grandson of the Lolas.
