= Dab (dance) =

Physical gesture

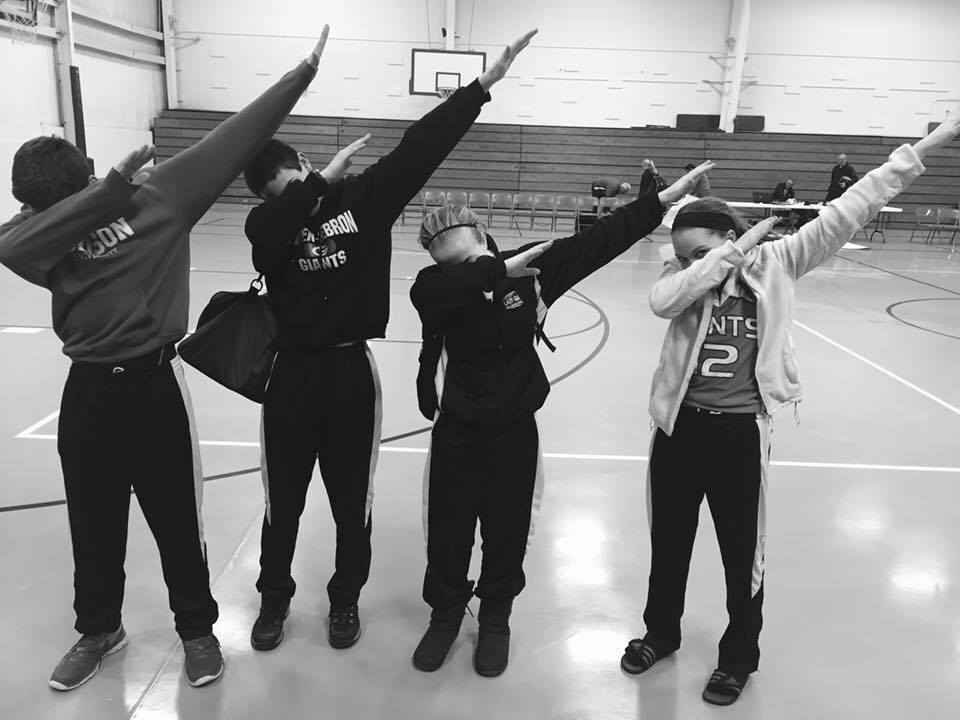
A group of teenagers dabbing

Dab, or dabbing, is a gesture in which a person leans forward into the bent crook of a slanted, upward angled arm, while raising the opposite arm out straight in a parallel direction. It appears to be similar to someone sneezing or coughing into an elbow. Since 2015, dabbing has been used as a gesture of triumph or playfulness, becoming a youthful fad and Internet meme.

== Origins ==
Before the term "dab" was coined, the move had been a feature of Japanese popular culture for decades. A popular example is the 1990s anime series Dragon Ball Z, where the character Gohan (as The Great Saiyaman) occasionally performs the dab. It is known as a "Sentai move" in Japan, from its popular use in the 1970s' Super Sentai and Kamen Rider tokusatsu superhero series (localised as Power Rangers and Masked Rider in the 1990s). During the show Detective Conan's (2000) opening theme "Koi wa Thrill, Shock, Suspense", the main character was shown dancing while occasionally dabbing; twenty years later, this opening was remade again in Opening 51, with the same character doing a few dabs when the theme music starts. Other anime series where the dab move appears include the early 2010s show Love Live!, among others. The English language audio dub of the Japanese anime series Yu-Gi-Oh! VRAINS (2017) adds a joke referring to a Sentai move as "the dab".

The move has been seen in mainstream music videos and used in pop performers' dance routines, such as in singer Janet Jackson's music videos for "The Pleasure Principle" (1987), "Escapade" (1990), and "If" (1993). On her The MDNA Tour (2012), singer Madonna and her backup dancers incorporated a quick dab move into the opening dance routine to her song "Girl Gone Wild".

Some Quality Control artists had claimed the dab was invented by rapper Skippa Da Flippa, and that its origins were within the Atlanta hip-hop scene of the 2010s. However, the Migos—who subsequently released a single entitled "Look at My Dab" (2015)—claimed to have invented the move, but later stated that Skippa Da Flippa was the true creator (after criticism from another member of that label, OG Maco).

American rapper Bow Wow attempted to explain the origin of the dab, saying it derived from the cannabis dabbers community, which started in and around 2012, before the dance move was created, a statement which earned the artist opposition from other rappers who immediately took to Twitter to insult Bow Wow and disprove his claims. The rappers Peewee Longway, Jose Guapo and Rich the Kid also contributed to popularizing the dab dance.

An Indian dance includes a wingtip-hand version of dabbing; Bollywood dancers can be seen performing the move in the song "Tamma Tamma Loge".

== Popularity ==
As XXL magazine reported in August 2015, "What started as a regional down South adlib is quickly becoming a masterful maneuver in clubs and on street corners. It’s called dabbin’." Jason Derulo and Ella Honey taught James Corden how to dab during the November 4, 2015, edition of "Carpool Karaoke" on The Late Late Show with James Corden.

The dab gained popularity in American sports following an eight-second celebratory dab by Cam Newton, football quarterback for the Carolina Panthers of the National Football League, during a game against the Tennessee Titans on November 15, 2015. According to a Sports Illustrated account of the incident, "[w]hen two Titans players confronted [Newton] about the celebration, he continued to dance in their faces, even as he backed away." Newton explained the incident by crediting a 16-year-old for instructing him to "Dab on them folks":

I'm a firm believer that if you don't like me to do it then don't let me in ... I just like doing it, man. It's not to be boastful, and from the crowd's response they like seeing it. ... Tell me what to do "Dab on them folks," so I tried "Dab on them folks," in that tone too. "Dab on them folks." He's only like 16, but he's got an Adam's apple out of this world.

It was later confirmed that the 16-year-old was Newton's younger brother Caylin. The dab was performed by multiple members of the Denver Broncos during Super Bowl 50, mocking Newton's signature celebration as they went on to beat his Panthers 24-10. On June 9, 2016, Cam Newton announced that he would no longer perform the celebration. However, he dabbed again on November 13, 2016, after a touchdown against the Kansas City Chiefs, nearly a year after his initial dab against the Titans.

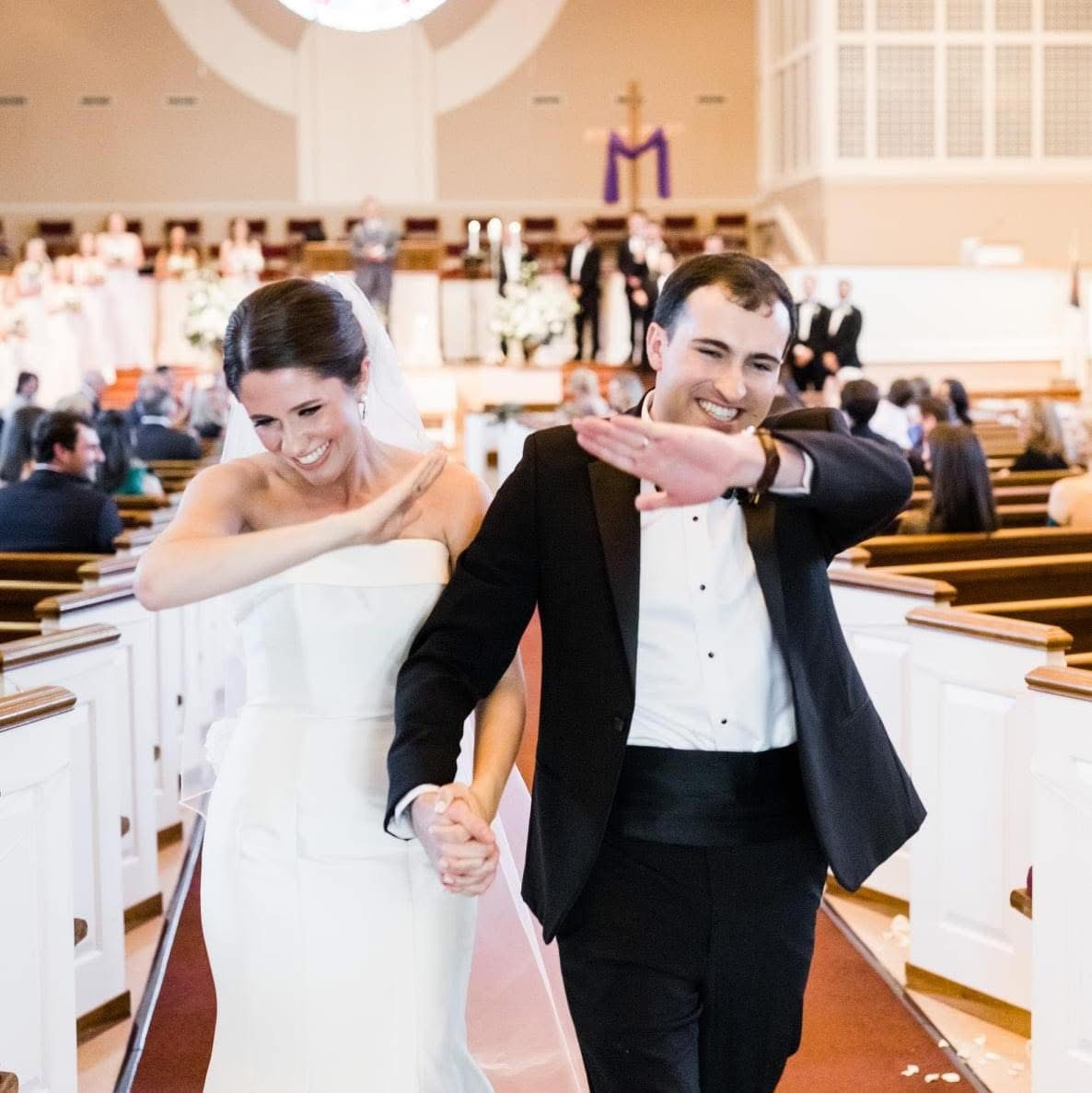
Couple dabbing during a wedding ceremony

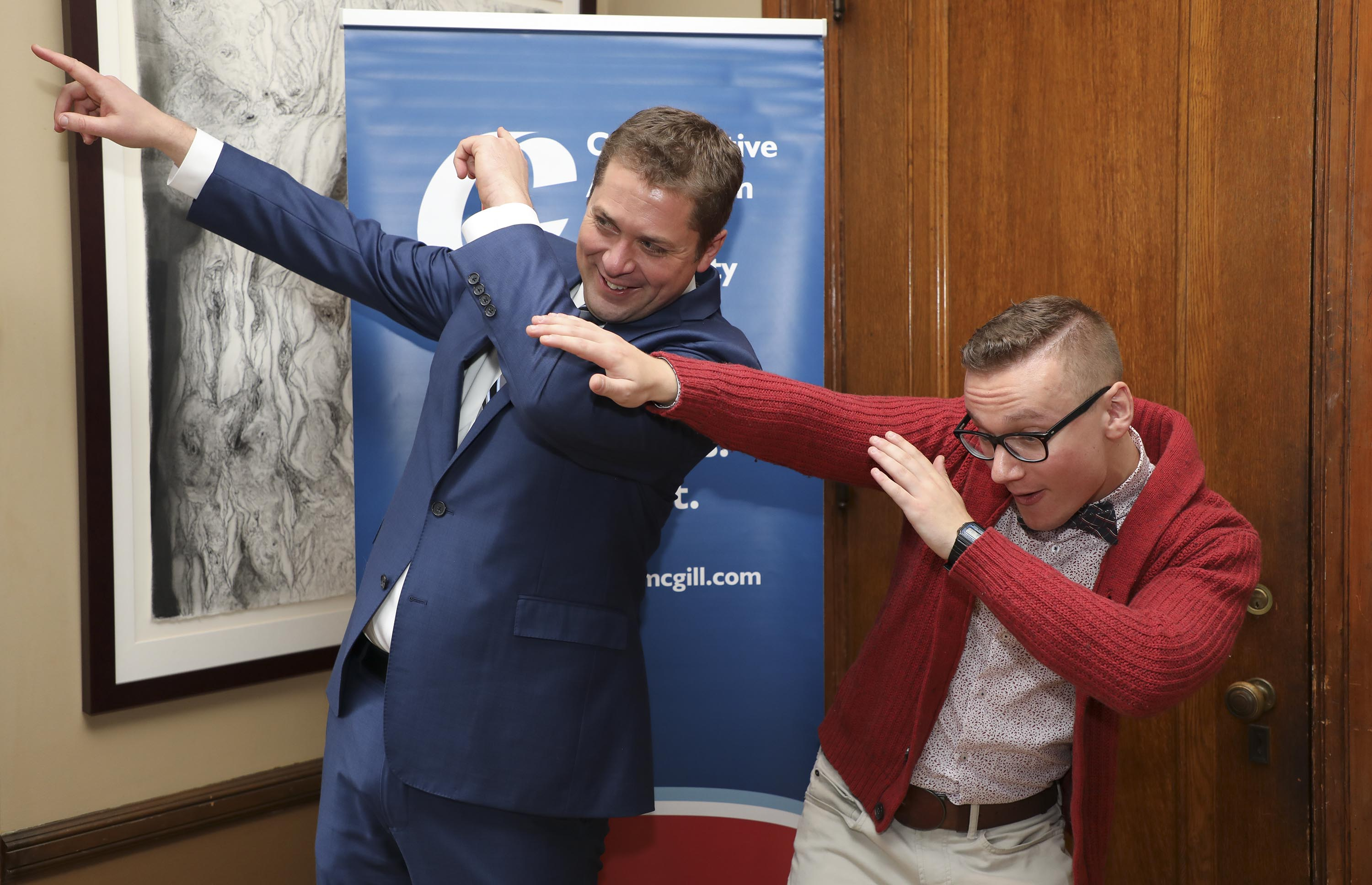
Andrew Scheer, former leader of the Conservative Party of Canada, dabbing with a university student

Dabbing has made its appearance in politics, as well. In January 2016, Democratic presidential candidate Hillary Clinton dabbed on The Ellen DeGeneres Show. In October 2016, Congresswoman Loretta Sanchez dabbed at the end of a Senate debate against Attorney General Kamala Harris. On January 3, 2017, Cal Marshall, 17-year-old son of Rep. Roger Marshall (R-Kan), dabbed at his father's swearing in as a Congressman, confusing House Speaker Paul Ryan. On February 22, 2017, Deputy Leader of the Labour Party Tom Watson dabbed in the UK's House of Commons. French presidential candidates Emmanuel Macron, Benoît Hamon and François Fillon dabbed on TV in March 2017. In May 2017, Prince Sverre Magnus of Norway dabbed at the Royal Palace in Oslo during his grandparents' King Harald V and Queen Sonja's official appearance for their 80th birthday. In October 2017, Australian Labor Party leader Bill Shorten dabbed as part of a diss track criticising members of the Liberal Party. He later alluded to the dab's infamy, stating that his children had been "humiliated" by it.

In July 2016, Formula One driver Lewis Hamilton dabbed in celebration of his win at the Hungarian Grand Prix.

In January 2017, an Australian cricketer Usman Khawaja dabbed in celebration of his half-century score in a Test match against Pakistan in Sydney. His move received mixed reactions, with some praising it and others accusing him of disrespecting his opponents.

In February 2017, the President of Kenya, Uhuru Kenyatta, invited a dance group to State House to perform the dab dance move with him. The president was doing the dab dance in a bid to appeal to the youthful population of Kenya to come out and register as voters. Some critics found this move to be in bad taste since there were other pressing issues like the doctors and lecturers strike that the president should have been dealing with rather than dancing.

Today, the dab is both a dance move and a statement. The culture behind it has been propagated by celebrity use and memes. Many dancers incorporate the move in their repertoire as a minor addition to a set; a dab is usually used to mark a drop. In addition, the dance move has become notorious around the world and has gained the significant attraction and attention from media in many countries.

Manchester United footballers Paul Pogba and Jesse Lingard also popularised the dab by performing the dance as their goal celebration. Wrestler T. J. Perkins often uses the move as a taunt or a sign of disrespect after a headstand headscissors takedown.

On December 24, 2017, the dance move was added to the hit game Fortnite. When it was released it cost 500 'vbucks', which was equivalent to $5 USD at the time. Since then, they have added many other varieties like the 'Infinite Dab' and the 'Gentleman's Dab.'

== Illegality in Saudi Arabia ==
In Saudi Arabia, dabbing was made illegal by the National Committee for Drug Control, as it was deemed that it alludes to cannabis and other illegal substances. In August 2017, Saudi singer and actor Abdallah Al Shaharani was arrested for performing the move at a music festival in Ta'if, and afterwards he apologized in a tweet.

== See also ==
- Quenelle (gesture)
- Hit Dem Folks
- Nae Nae
- Twerk
