= Nae Nae =

Hip-hop dance

- The Nae Nae performed as an associated act with 99 Percent
- Inventor: We Are Toonz
- Year: 2013

The Nae Nae (/ˈneɪ neɪ/) is a hip-hop dance move that involves placing one arm in the air and swaying from side to side. The Atlanta hip hop group We Are Toonz is credited for inventing the phrase with their hit song "Drop That NaeNae" in 2013. The dance was based on a character from the 1990s sitcom Martin. In the series, Martin Lawrence cross-dressed to play Sheneneh Jenkins, an exaggerated, sassy "ghetto girl". The group member Callamar stated in an interview with Billboard, "It's really just based on a ratchet girl in the club dancing kind of funny and the best girl to describe it is Sheneneh from Martin." In one interview, Martin Lawrence stated he was "flattered" by the dance.

Throughout 2014, the song achieved popularity on social media such as Vine, Twitter, Instagram, and YouTube. It has also been performed as a celebratory dance at collegiate and professional sporting events.

Tutorial on how to do the Nae Nae

In 2015, American rapper Silentó released his debut single "Watch Me (Whip/Nae Nae)" which also included the Nae Nae along with other dance moves, appearing in viral videos and mainstream media.

Numerous celebrities have been covered by the social and mainstream media when they performed the dance, including Jeremy Lin and Stephen Curry, Dwight Howard, Lance Moore, TLC, John Wall, Pharrell Williams, Miley Cyrus, J. J. Watt, and Hillary Clinton. The video game NBA 2K16 allows players to dance the Nae Nae.

Then-President of the United States Barack Obama publicly praised a Washington, D.C. police officer who did the dance with a teenager in October 2015.

== See also ==
Similar dance trends include:

- Dab – Physical gesture
- Hit dem folks – Dance trend
- Hit the Quan
- Juju on that beat – 2016 single by Zay Hilfigerrr & Zayion McCall
