= Naynay =

NayNay may mean:

- Nene (bird)
- Nay nay (hip hop dance move)
