= Silentó =

American former rapper and convicted killer (born 1998)

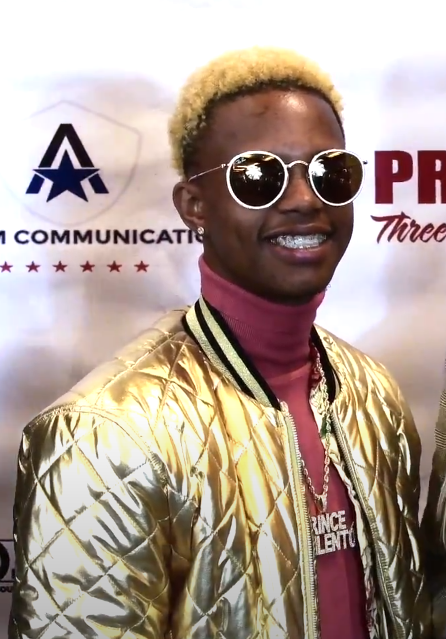
- Silentó in 2018

Background information
- Also known as: Ricky Hawk
- Born: Richard Lamar Hawk; January 23, 1998 (age 28); Stone Mountain, Georgia, U.S.
- Origin: Atlanta, Georgia, U.S.
- Genre: Pop rap
- Occupations: Rapper; singer; songwriter
- Years active: 2015–2021
- Label: Capitol
- Website: Official website (archived)
- Criminal information
- Status: Incarcerated
- Convictions: Voluntary manslaughter, aggravated assault
- Penalty: 30 years in prison

Richard Lamar Hawk (born January 23, 1998), known professionally as Silentó, is an American former rapper and convicted felon. Raised in Atlanta, Georgia, Hawk is best known for his 2015 debut single "Watch Me (Whip/Nae Nae)", which peaked at number three on the US Billboard Hot 100 when he was 19 years old.

In 2021, he was arrested in DeKalb County, Georgia, after a string of arrests for various crimes and charged with the murder of his cousin, Frederick Rooks III. In 2025, he was sentenced to 30 years in prison after pleading guilty to the lesser charge of voluntary manslaughter.

== Early life ==
Richard Lamar Hawk was born on January 23, 1998 in Stone Mountain, Georgia. He has stated that he was born with multiple drugs found in his system, including cocaine, heroin, and marijuana, and that he grew up seeing his family members attempting to kill one another and talking to walls. At age 14, he lived with his great-aunt and was soon placed in a juvenile detention center. He was raised in Atlanta, where he began performing music as part of a group while in eighth grade before making solo music as a high-schooler.

== Career ==
Hawk chose the stage name Silentó based on his goal of being "less talk and more action".

Prompted by losing a high school talent show, Hawk independently released his debut single, "Watch Me (Whip/Nae Nae)", as Silentó on SoundCloud in January 2015. It was based on previous hip-hop dance trends including the whip, the Nae Nae, the Stanky Legg, and the Superman. He promoted it on his Instagram and SoundCloud accounts and by performing it at local birthday parties, school events, and roller rinks. The digital distribution network TuneCore soon helped to promote the song through an April 2015 partnership with DanceOn, a dance-based multi-channel network on YouTube that paid its partner channels through Content ID, to make videos set to the song with the hashtag #WatchMeDanceOn. User-generated videos on both YouTube and Vine then made the song a dance craze and brought it to viral success by June 2015. It peaked at number three on the US Billboard Hot 100, where it spent 53 weeks, and was certified 6× platinum by the Recording Industry Association of America (RIAA). It also topped Billboard's Hot R&B/Hip-Hop Songs chart in September 2015. A&R executive Alex Wilhelm signed Silentó to Capitol Records in May 2015. The song's success made Silentó known as a one-hit wonder.

In June 2015, Silentó performed "Watch Me (Whip/Nae Nae)" on the ABC program Good Morning America, which he described as his breakout moment, in conjunction with the release of the song's accompanying music video. It had over 500 million views by December of that year; by 2020, it was one of the most-viewed hip-hop music videos on YouTube with 1.9 billion views as of May 2025. Also in 2015, Silentó performed at the BET Awards alongside the cast of the show Black-ish in June, at a Jack Ü concert in August, and at the Circle City Classic in September. "Watch Me (Whip/Nae Nae)" was nominated for the Teen Choice Award for Choice Music – R&B/Hip-Hop Song in 2015. Silentó was further featured on a remix of Dawin's October 2015 song "Dessert" and on Sophia Grace's June 2016 song "Girl in the Mirror". He later performed "Watch Me (Whip/Nae Nae)" at the 2016 Kids' Choice Awards in March of that year and in Times Square for Dick Clark's New Year's Rockin' Eve that year.

Silentó's collaborative single with Korean singer Punch was released in 2016 and produced by Brave Brothers; it won the World Collaboration Award at the 26th Seoul Music Awards in January 2017, where Silentó performed it and "Watch Me (Whip/Nae Nae)". Silentó was the featured guest on Let's Dance: The Tour, a national tour from March to May 2016 that also featured DLow, We Are Toonz, iLoveMemphis, and 99 Percent. Silentó's debut studio album, Fresh Outta High School, was released in August 2018, while its follow-up, Fresh Outta High School, Pt. 2, was released five months later. Steve "Flash" Juon of RapReviews wrote in a review of Fresh Outta High School that the album "unintentionally feels like a slow descent into madness".

== Personal life ==
In May 2019, Silentó appeared on the daytime talk show The Doctors to discuss his adverse childhood experiences and his resulting anxiety and depression. According to Chanel Hudson, his publicist at the time, he was scheduled to make subsequent appearances on other television shows and partake in further therapy sessions, but did not attend either. He also stated that he attempted suicide in 2020.

=== Legal issues and manslaughter conviction ===
In March 2017, after failing to appear at two of his scheduled performances in the United Arab Emirates (UAE)—one in Al Ain and another in Abu Dhabi—the city of Al Ain placed a travel ban on Silentó, ordering him to forfeit his passport and barring him from leaving the UAE until he paid the shows' promoter DH 300,000 (US$81,690) in lost fees. He soon posted a crowdfunding link to his Twitter for his return to the United States titled "Free Silento".

In August 2020, Silentó was arrested by the Santa Ana Police Department and taken into custody by the Orange County Sheriff's Department on a charge of inflicting injury on a cohabitant, then released. The next day, he entered a random home in Valley Village, Los Angeles, wielding a hatchet in search of his girlfriend, which he swung at two people before his friend came to inform him he was at the wrong house. He was disarmed by the family in the home, arrested by the Los Angeles Police Department, and charged with two counts of assault with a deadly weapon.

Silentó was then arrested in Atlanta and charged with speeding, reckless driving, parking in a prohibited space, and driving on roadways laned for traffic in October 2020 after driving at 143 miles per hour (230 km/h) on Interstate 85, where the speed limit was 65 miles per hour (105 km/h), and telling officers that he was able to drive that quickly because he was "not a regular person". He was released later that day.

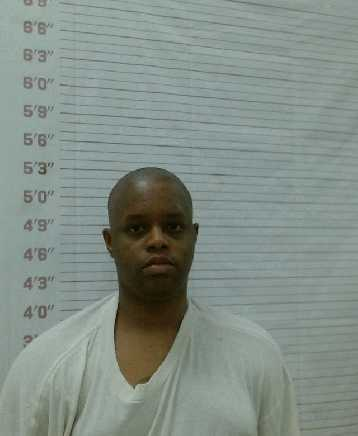
Silentó's mugshot

At around 3:30 a.m. on January 21, 2021, in DeKalb County, Georgia, Silentó's 34-year-old cousin, Frederick Rooks, was found bleeding profusely by police, with gunshot wounds in his face and leg, before dying. Silentó was arrested in connection with the shooting and charged with malice murder and felony murder. Silentó's grandparents asked the judge to deny his $25,000 bail request. In June 2025, Hawk was sentenced to 30 years in prison after pleading guilty but mentally ill to the lesser charge of voluntary manslaughter. He also received a consecutive five-year sentence for aggravated assault with a deadly weapon for firing a gun in the direction of two other people.

== Musical style ==
Silentó stated in 2015 that his style, which he described as a mix of rapping and singing, was defined by the lack of profanity in his songs. He has named his biggest musical influences as Mariah Carey, Future, Ciara, Young Thug, Cash Out, Rich Kidz, Boosie Badazz, and Usher.

== Discography ==
=== Mixtapes ===
Title	Album details
Fresh Outta High School	Released: August 3, 2018; Label: BB&R Enterprises; Format: Digital download, streaming
Fresh Outta High School 2	Released: December 7, 2018; Label: BB&R Enterprises; Format: Digital download, streaming
Skyrolyrics	Released: October 14, 2020; Label: Self-released; Format: Digital download, streaming
Bars Behind Bars	Released: March 13, 2021; Label: BB&R Enterprises; Format: Digital download, streaming

=== Extended plays ===
Title	EP details
SilentóMOB: The Doctor's Exclusive	Released: May 10, 2019; Label: BB&R Enterprises; Format: Digital download, streaming

=== Singles ===
==== As lead artist ====
List of singles, with selected chart positions and certifications
Title	Year	Peak chart positions										Certifications	Album
Title	Year	US	AUS	CAN	DEN	FRA	GER	NZ	SWE	SWI	UK	Certifications	Album
"Watch Me (Whip/Nae Nae)"	2015	3	9	15	16	19	50	11	52	41	19	RIAA: 6× Platinum; ARIA: 2× Platinum; BPI: Platinum; BVMI: Gold; GLF: Gold; IFPI DEN: Platinum; MC: 2× Platinum; RMNZ: Platinum	Non-album single
"No Worries"	2020	—	—	—	—	—	—	—	—	—	—		Skyrolyrics
"No Sense"	2020	—	—	—	—	—	—	—	—	—	—		Bars Behind Bars
"—" denotes a recording that did not chart or was not released in that territory.

==== As featured artist ====
List of singles, with selected chart positions and certifications
Title	Year	Peak chart positions			Certifications	Album
Title	Year	DEN	NOR	SWE	Certifications	Album
"Lightning in a Bottle" (Sunny featuring Silentó)	2015	—	—	—		Non-album single
"Dessert" (Dawin featuring Silentó)	2015	17	—	—	IFPI DEN: Platinum	Dessert
"Girl in the Mirror" (Sophia Grace featuring Silentó)	2016	—	—	—		Non-album singles
"Emoji" (Sicko Mobb featuring Silentó)	2016	—	—	—		Non-album singles
"Spotlight" (Samuel featuring Silentó)	2016	—	—	—		Non-album singles
"Slide" (ELS featuring Silentó)	2017	—	—	—		Non-album singles
"Like It Like It" (Marcus & Martinus featuring Silentó)	2017	—	16	48		Moments
"—" denotes a recording that did not chart or was not released in that territory.

==== Promotional singles ====
List of singles
Title	Year	Album
"Get Em"	2016	Non-album single

=== Guest appearances ===
List of non-single guest appearances, with other performing artists, showing year released and album name
Title	Year	Other artist(s)	Album
"Volcano"	2015	The Vamps	Wake Up
"Juicy Fruit"	2018	The Vamps	Night & Day (Day Edition)

== Awards and nominations ==
Accolades for Silentó
Year	Award	Category	Work	Result
2015	Soul Train Music Awards	Best Dance Performance	"Watch Me (Whip/Nae Nae)"	Won
2017	26th Seoul Music Awards	Global Collaboration Award	"Spotlight" w/Punch	Won
