= Martin (TV series) =

American television sitcom (1992–1997)

- Genre: Sitcom
- Created by: John Bowman; Martin Lawrence; Topper Carew
- Starring: Martin Lawrence; Tisha Campbell; Carl Anthony Payne II; Thomas Mikal Ford; Tichina Arnold; Jon Gries; Garrett Morris
- Theme music composer: Steve Keitt for Kid Entertainment, Inc. Joey Kibble II; Mark Kibble; Paul Wright III
- Composers: Greg Poree & Paul Jackson Jr. (season 1); Bill Maxwell (seasons 2–5)
- Country of origin: United States
- Original language: English
- No. of seasons: 5
- No. of episodes: 132 (list of episodes)

Production
- Executive producers: John Bowman; Topper Carew; Martin Lawrence; Bentley Kyle Evans; Billy Van Zandt; Jane Milmore; Samm-Art Williams
- Producers: Walter Barnett; Terry Crotzer; Mark J. Greenberg; Cheryl Holliday; Bennie R. Richburg, Jr. Robert Lawrence
- Production locations: Universal City Studios, Universal City, California
- Cinematography: William Updegraff; Gary W. Scott; Alan Walker
- Camera setup: Multi-camera
- Running time: 22–24 minutes
- Production companies: You Go Boy! Productions (1994–1997; seasons 3–5); HBO Independent Productions

Original release
- Network: Fox
- Release: August 27, 1992 – May 1, 1997

Martin is an American television sitcom that aired for five seasons on Fox from August 27, 1992, to May 1, 1997. The show stars comedian Martin Lawrence as the titular character. Lawrence also played several other characters. Martin was one of Fox's highest-rated shows during the sitcom's run. In 2024, the cast reunited at the 75th Primetime Emmy Awards.

== Premise ==
Martin Lawrence played the role of Martin Payne, originally a disc jockey who lived with his girlfriend Gina Waters (Tisha Campbell) in the city of Detroit, Michigan. Martin worked for the fictional radio station WZUP; in later seasons, he became the host of the talk show Word on the Street.

== Characters ==
=== Main characters ===
- Martin Lawrence as Martin Payne
- Tisha Campbell as Gina Waters-Payne
- Carl Anthony Payne II as Cole Brown
- Thomas Mikal Ford as Thomas "Tommy" Strawn
- Tichina Arnold as Pamela "Pam" James
- Jon Gries as Shawn McDermott (seasons 1–2)
- Garrett Morris as Stan Winters (seasons 1–2; guest season 3)

=== Supporting characters ===
- Reginald Ballard as Bruh-Man (Brother Man) (seasons 2–4)
- Tracy Morgan as Hustle Man (seasons 3–4)
- Jeri Gray as Ms. Geri
- Maura McDade as Shanise McGillicuddy (season 5)
- Sean Lampkin as Nipsey (seasons 3–5)

=== Recurring characters ===
- Judyann Elder as Nadine Waters
- J. A. Preston as Dr. Cliff Waters
- Adrian Tibbs as Lil' Dawg
- Ray Massara as Buckwhite
- Charlie Murphy as Bro Fo' Real
- David Jean Thomas as Angry Man
- Jeris Lee Poindexter as Mr. Booker
- Ellia English as Mrs. Booker
- Laura Hayes as Maddie Brown
- LaWanda Page as Evelyn Porter
- David Alan Grier as Reverend Leon Lonnie Love
- Roxanne Reese as Marian
- Kenneth Whack as Kenji
- Simbi Khali as Laquita
- Yo-Yo as Keylolo
- Kim Coles as Bonquisha
- Reno Wilson as Sonny
- Tommy Davidson as Varnell Hill
- Luis Antonio Ramos as Luis
- Bentley Kyle Evans as Titus
- BeBe Drake-Massey as Myra
- Angelina Estrada as Gloria Rodriguez

=== Other roles played by Lawrence ===
- Sheneneh Jenkins
- Edna (Mama) Payne
- Ol' Otis (seasons 1–4)
- Jerome (seasons 1–4)
- Roscoe
- Dragonfly Jones (seasons 1–3)
- Bob (seasons 1–2)
- King Beef (seasons 1–2)
- Elroy Preston (season 2)

== Episodes ==
Season	Episodes	Originally released		Rank	Average viewers (in millions)
Season	Episodes	First released	Last released	Rank	Average viewers (in millions)
1	27	August 27, 1992	May 13, 1993	#41	18.13
2	27	August 22, 1993	May 15, 1994	#64	15.41
3	27	September 1, 1994	May 18, 1995	#92	12.74
4	27	September 9, 1995	May 2, 1996	#104	10.82
5	24	September 5, 1996	May 1, 1997	#110	8.95

== Broadcast history ==
Season	Timeslot
1992–93 (season 1)	Thursday at 8:30–9:00 pm
1993–94 (season 2)	Sunday at 8:00–8:30 pm
1994–95 (season 3)	Thursday at 8:00–8:30 pm
1995–96 (season 4)	Saturday at 8:00–8:30 pm (September 9, 1995 – October 28, 1995); Sunday at 8:30–9:00 pm (November 5, 1995 – February 4, 1996; February 18 – 25, 1996); Thursday at 8:30–9:00 pm (February 8 – 15, 1996; February 29 – May 2, 1996)
1996–97 (season 5)	Thursday at 8:00–8:30 pm

== Lawsuit ==
In November 1996, Campbell left the series during its final season, citing "intolerable" working conditions. She filed a lawsuit against Lawrence and the show's producers in January 1997 for sexual harassment and verbal and physical assaults. The series explanation was that Gina was "out on business", though in the two-part episode "Going Overboard" it was stated that Gina had arrived too late to board the boat for the trip alongside everyone else. By April 1997, Campbell had settled the lawsuit and returned for the last two episodes of the series under the condition that she would not share any scenes or interact with Lawrence. Campbell and Lawrence have since reconciled, and repaired their relationship.

== Awards and nominations ==
Year	Award	Result	Category	Recipient
1993	People's Choice Awards	Won	Favorite TV New Comedy Series	
1994	NAACP Image Awards	Won	Outstanding Comedy Series	
1995	NAACP Image Awards	Won	Outstanding Lead Actor in a Comedy Series	Martin Lawrence
1995	NAACP Image Awards	Won	Outstanding Comedy Series	
1996	NAACP Image Awards	Nominated	Outstanding Supporting Actress in a Comedy Series	Marla Gibbs
1996	NAACP Image Awards	Nominated	Outstanding Supporting Actor in a Comedy Series	Carl Anthony Payne II
1996	NAACP Image Awards	Nominated	Outstanding Supporting Actor in a Comedy Series	Thomas Mikal Ford
1996	NAACP Image Awards	Nominated	Outstanding Lead Actress in a Comedy Series	Tisha Campbell-Martin
1996	NAACP Image Awards	Nominated	Outstanding Comedy Series	
1996	NAACP Image Awards	Won	Outstanding Supporting Actress in a Comedy Series	Tichina Arnold
1996	NAACP Image Awards	Won	Outstanding Lead Actor in a Comedy Series	Martin Lawrence
1997	NAACP Image Awards	Nominated	Outstanding Lead Actress in a Comedy Series	Tisha Campbell-Martin
1997	NAACP Image Awards	Nominated	Outstanding Lead Actor in a Comedy Series	Martin Lawrence
1997	NAACP Image Awards	Nominated	Outstanding Comedy Series	
1995	Nickelodeon Kids' Choice Awards	Nominated	Favorite Television Show	
1995	Nickelodeon Kids' Choice Awards	Nominated	Favorite Television Actor	Martin Lawrence
1996	Nickelodeon Kids' Choice Awards	Nominated	Favorite Television Actor	Martin Lawrence

== Syndication ==
Martin went into second run syndication on August 8, 1995, through Warner Bros. Domestic Television Distribution; it airs multiple times a week on the networks of Paramount Skydance, including MTV2, VH1 and BET, with HBO also carrying the full run of the series. Martin made its debut on Dabl on October 6, 2025, with a "Get Into Martin" marathon that preceded its arrival to the lineup on October 5.

== Home media ==
Besides being purchasable on most digital video retailers, HBO Home Video released all five seasons of Martin on DVD in Region 1.

DVD name	Ep #	Release date
The Complete First Season	27	January 4, 2007
The Complete Second Season	27	May 15, 2007
The Complete Third Season	27	November 6, 2007
The Complete Fourth Season	27	April 1, 2008
The Complete Fifth and Final Season	24	October 7, 2008
The Complete Series	132	February 4, 2020

== Reunion ==
In 2022, cast members Martin Lawrence, Tisha Campbell, Tichina Arnold, and Carl Anthony Payne II and other guests reunited. Notably missing from the reunion was Thomas Mikal Ford, who had died in 2016, but Martin: The Reunion paid tribute to him. The 90-minute special was released on June 16, 2022, on BET+ and directed by Stan Lathan.

=== Spin-offs ===
Goin' For Mine

On April 17, 1997, the fifth-season episode "Goin' for Mine" aired as a backdoor pilot for a proposed spin-off series centered on Pamela James, played by Tichina Arnold. The episode follows Pam as she pursues a career as an A&R executive at Keep It Real Records. The proposed spin-off was not picked up and was never produced as a series.

==== Young Martin ====
On July 11, 2024, an hour-long prequel series to Martin, titled Young Martin, was announced to be in development by Deadline Hollywood. The series is executive produced by Martin Lawrence, Rae Proctor, Robert Lawrence and Stacy Lyles from RunTelDat, with Bob Yari, David McPherson, Rosa Peart, Greg Martin for WonderHill Studios,

Young Martin follows a teenage Martin Payne residing in a modern-day Detroit finding his path to success as he transitions from childhood to adulthood and is described as both an origin story and a reimagining of the character.

==== The Varnell Hill Show ====
On April 15, 2025, Varnell Hill, a spin-off series was originally green-lit by BET+. It will be headlined by actor-comedian Tommy Davidson, reprising his character Varnell Hill from the Martin series. Kym Whitley joined the cast in August 2025 as a series regular. On August 7, 2026, it was announced the series would instead be released as The Varnell Hill Show on Paramount+ on September 1, 2026, as BET+ merged with Paramount+ in July of that year.

== Cultural Impact ==
Martin has had a lasting influence on popular culture, particularly hip-hop and R&B. The series' characters, catchphrases and storylines have been repeatedly referenced in music and popular media decades after its original broadcast. The Miami R&B group Pretty Ricky took its name from Ricky Fontaine, also known as "Pretty Ricky," a character played by Miguel A. Núñez Jr., who appeared in Season 2, Episode 2.

The series has also been frequently referenced by hip-hop artists. Artists including Kanye West, J. Cole, Lil Wayne, Curren$y, T-Pain and Polo G have referenced characters, relationships or catchphrases from the series in their music. Polo G's 2020 single "Martin & Gina" directly references Martin Payne and Gina Waters, while its accompanying music video recreated scenes and visual elements from the sitcom.

The show's influence also extended to viral dance culture. The hip-hop group We Are Toonz cited Martin Lawrence's character Sheneneh Jenkins as the inspiration for their 2013 song and dance "Drop That #NaeNae," which became associated with the popularization of the Nae Nae dance.

The song "Yamz," originally recorded by Masego and Devin Morrison, takes its title and hook from a scene in Martin in which Martin Payne asks, "How can I get to the yams?" while talking to Varnell Hill (played by Tommy Davidson) in Season 2, Episode 11. In 2022, Fetty Wap released a rendition of the song, titled "Sweet Yamz", with cover artwork that incorporated a stylized version of the Martin title logo.

Martin was also notable for its integration of hip-hop and R&B culture into a mainstream sitcom. The series featured numerous prominent hip-hop artists, including The Notorious B.I.G., Method Man, Outkast, Snoop Dogg and MC Hammer, as well as R&B artists, including Kenny "Babyface" Edmonds, Brian McKnight, and Keith Washington.
