= Alex Wilhelm =

German-American music executive

- Occupations: Music executive; A&R representative
- Years active: 2008–present
- Labels: Capitol; Warner; APG

Alex Wilhelm is a German-American music executive and the owner of 16 Entertainment, an independent music company dedicated to artist development, which according to Billboard Magazine has hit 5 billion streams, providing an empowering alternative to independent-minded artists. Prior to founding his own company, Wilhelm held senior A&R positions at major record labels including Warner Records, Capitol Records, and Atlantic Records/APG. He has signed multiple multi-platinum selling artists, served on the Grammy Awards Committee, and has been featured on Billboard's "Indie Power Players" and "40 under 40" lists.

== Early Career ==
=== Crazed Hits ===
Wilhelm started his career by founding influential independent A&R company Crazed Hits out of his bedroom in Germany, through which he discovered a variety of major recording artists, including LMFAO, Drake, Imagine Dragons, The Weeknd, Nicki Minaj, Owl City, Brantley Gilbert, Mike Posner, Jessie J, Odd Future, and others. During his time at Crazed Hits, Wilhelm also discovered the hit song "If I Were A Boy", which was later recorded by Beyoncé.

== Major Label Career ==
=== Warner Bros. Records ===
In October 2012, Wilhelm became the Director of A&R at Warner Bros. Records, where he was involved in signing and/or serving as A&R for artists such as Passenger, Jason Derulo, and Bebe Rexha.

=== Capitol Music Group ===
In September 2014, Wilhelm joined Capitol Music Group, where he was promoted to Senior Director of A&R. At Capitol, Wilhelm signed multi-platinum recording artist Calum Scott, who scored international hits with his singles "Dancing On My Own" and "You Are The Reason." Scott's platinum-selling debut album, "Only Human," has generated over 6 billion streams. Wilhelm also brought pop rapper Silento to Capitol who scored an international hit with his debut single "Watch Me (Whip/Nae Nae)", certified six-times Platinum in the United States.

=== Atlantic Records/APG ===
In September 2017, Wilhelm joined APG and Atlantic Records, where he was promoted to VP of A&R and ran the A&R Research Department. Additionally, he was the lead consultant at Warner Music Group for Sodatone, a machine-learning and AI-driven A&R Data Platform. WMG acquired Sodatone in 2018.

== Independent Sector ==
=== 48 Hours Entertainment ===
In April 2021, Wilhelm co-founded 48 Hours Entertainment together with former Rolling Stones and Garbage manager Steve Moir, who now manages John Mayer, The Black Keys and Mickey Guyton. In August 2021, Wilhelm was named one of the 40 most powerful music executives under the age of 40 by Billboard magazine. In January 2023, Wilhelm's client Hotel Ugly peaked at #22 on the Spotify U.S. Chart and entered the Billboard Hot 100 with their hit single "Shut Up My Mom's Calling." The song, which was released independently, generated over 400 million streams globally.

=== 16 Entertainment ===
In 2022, Wilhelm established 16 Entertainment, a music company designed to offer an empowering alternative for independent-minded artists. He was named to Billboard magazine's Indie Power Player list for his contributions to the independent music sector.

Across his independent ventures, Wilhelm has signed and worked with artists including Hotel Ugly, TV Girl, Violent Vira, and Nic D, among others. Cumulatively, these artists have generated over 15 billion streams independently.
