= Close to Your Heart =

2000 single by Rina Aiuchi

Single by Rina Aiuchi

from the album Be Happy
- B-side: "Black Eyes, Blue Tears"
- Released: March 23, 2000
- Recorded: 1999–2000
- Genre: J-pop
- Length: 5:01
- Label: Giza Studio
- Songwriter(s): Rina Aiuchi; Aika Ohno
- Producer(s): Rina Aiuchi; Kannonji

Rina Aiuchi singles chronology
"Close to Your Heart" (2000)	"It's Crazy for You" (2000)

"Close to Your Heart" is the debut single by Japanese singer-songwriter Rina Aiuchi. It was released on 23 March 2000 through Giza Studio, as the lead single from her debut album Be Happy. The song served as the theme song to the Japanese animated television series Monster Rancher.

The single was released in four versions with different colors of the cover: pink, white, yellow, and purple. All the versions include the same tracks.

== Commercial performance ==
"Close to Your Heart" reached at number nineteen on the Oricon Weekly Singles Chart, selling 64,000 physical copies.

== Track listing ==
No.	Title	Writer(s)	Arranger(s)	Length
1.	"Close to Your Heart"	Rina Aiuchi; Aika Ohno	Kuuron Oshiro	5:01
2.	"Black Eyes, Blue Tears"	Aiuchi; Ohno	Oshiro
3.	"Close to Your Heart" (Viva Rina Q Remix)	Aiuchi; Ohno	Captain Dinamo
4.	"Close to Your Heart" (Instrumental)	Aiuchi; Ohno	Oshiro

== Charts ==
Chart (2000)	Peak position
Japan (Oricon)	19

== Certification and sales ==
Region	Certification	Certified units/sales
Japan (RIAJ)	None	64,000

== Release history ==
Region	Date	Format	Label
Japan	23 March 2000	CD single	Giza Studio
