= It's Crazy for You =

2000 single by Rina Aiuchi

Single by Rina Aiuchi

from the album Be Happy
- B-side: "Golden Moonlight"
- Released: May 31, 2000
- Recorded: 2000–2001
- Genre: J-pop
- Length: 4:25
- Label: Giza Studio
- Songwriter(s): Rina Aiuchi; Aika Ohno
- Producer(s): Rina Aiuchi; Kannonji

Rina Aiuchi singles chronology
"Close to Your Heart" (2000)	"It's Crazy for You" (2000)	"Ohh! Paradise Taste!!" (2000)

"It's Crazy for You" (stylized as "It's crazy for you") is a song by Japanese singer-songwriter Rina Aiuchi. It was released on 31 May 2000 through Giza Studio, as the second single from her debut studio album Be Happy. The song reached number sixteen in Japan and has sold over 56,070 copies nationwide.

== Covers ==
"It's Crazy for You" was covered by Aika Ohno, the writer of the song for her debut studio album Shadows of Dreams (2002), renamed as "I'm Crazy for You". The album peaked at number fifteen in Japan.

== Track listing ==
CD single
No.	Title	Writer(s)	Arranger(s)	Length
1.	"It's Crazy for You"	Rina Aiuchi; Aika Ohno	Kuuron Oshiro	4:25
2.	"Golden Moonlight"	Aiuchi; Ohno	Oshiro	4:17
3.	"It's Crazy for You" (Viva Rina The West "☆" Remix)	Aiuchi; Ohno	Captain Dinamo	4:13
4.	"Black Eyes, Blue Tears" (The Spy Who Came in from the Cold in Montparnasse Mix)	Aiuchi; Ohno	Division of Mark	4:49
5.	"It's Crazy for You" (Instrumental)	Aiuchi; Ohno	Oshiro	4:23

== Charts ==
Chart (2001)	Peak position
Japan (Oricon)	16

== Certification and sales ==
Region	Certification	Certified units/sales
Japan (RIAJ)	None	56,070

== Release history ==
Region	Date	Format	Catalogue Num.	Label	Ref.
Japan	31 May 2000	CD	GZCA-1033	Giza Studio	
