= Be Happy (Rina Aiuchi album) =

Studio album by Rina Aiuchi
- Released: 24 January 2001
- Recorded: 2000–2001
- Studio: Red Way Studio; Blue Way Studio; Green Way Studio; Birdman Mastering Room
- Genre: J-pop; Eurobeat
- Length: 49:50
- Label: Giza Studio
- Producer: Rina Aiuchi; Kanonji

Rina Aiuchi chronology
Be Happy (2001)	Power of Words (2002)

Singles from Be Happy
- 1. "Close to Your Heart" Released: 23 March 2000; 2. "It's Crazy for You" Released: 31 May 2000; 3. "Ohh! Paradise Taste!!" Released: 26 July 2000; 4. "Koi wa Thrill, Shock, Suspense" Released: 25 October 2000

Be Happy is the debut studio album by Japanese singer and songwriter Rina Aiuchi. It was released on 24 January 2001 by Giza Studio. A Eurobeat-tinged J-pop album, Be Happy yielded four singles, including the Japan top 5 hit "Koi wa Thrill, Shock, Suspense". The album reached number 3 on the Oricon albums chart in its first week and charted for seven weeks.

In support of the album, Aiuchi embarked on her first concert tour, Rina Aiuchi Club Circuit 2001 "Be Happy" from January 2001

== Promotion ==
=== Singles ===
"Close to Your Heart" was released on 23 March 2000 as the lead single of the album. The song served as the theme song to the Japanese animated television series Monster Rancher. The Eurobeat-influenced J-pop song written by Aiuchi and Aika Ohno reached number nineteen on the Oricon singles chart, selling approximately 64,000 copies nationwide.

The second single from the album, "It's Crazy for You" was released on 31 May 2000. The sex-themed Eurobeat song peaked at number sixteen on the Oricon chart.

On 26 July 2000, the follow-up single "Ohh! Paradise Taste!!" was released as the third single from the album. The Eurobeat-influenced J-pop song only managed to reach number twenty-three and sell approximately 43,000 copies in Japan, becoming her second lowest-charting song behind "Hanabi" (2010).

The fourth single from the album, "Koi wa Thrill, Shock, Suspense" was released on 25 October 2000. The song served as the opening theme song to the Japanese animated television series Case Closed. The opening movie left a big impression on the viewers, depicting the protagonist of the series, Conan Edogawa dancing Para Para dance to the song. "Koi wa Thrill, Shock, Suspense" was a commercial success, reaching number 5 on the Oricon singles chart and selling approximately 105,000 copies in Japan. The song has been certificated Gold by Recording Industry Association of Japan (RIAJ) and remains as Aiuchi's second best-selling song as of September 2018.

=== Tour ===
Rina Aiuchi Club Circuit 2001 "Be Happy"
- Tour by Rina Aiuchi
- Associated album: Be Happy
- Start date: 23 January 2001
- End date: 24 February 2001
- Legs: 1
- No. of shows: 9 in Japan

Rina Aiuchi concert chronology
- Rina Aiuchi Club Circuit 2001 "Be Happy" (2001); Rina Aiuchi Live Tour 2002 "Power of Words" (2002)

Rina Aiuchi Club Circuit 2001 "Be Happy" is the first concert tour by Japanese singer and songwriter Rina Aiuchi. It was launched in support of her debut studio album, Be Happy (2001).

Date	City	Country	Venue
Asia
23 January 2001	Shinjuku, Tokyo	Japan	Kagurazaka Twin Star
24 January 2001	Nagoya, Aichi	Japan	Club Ozone
26 January 2001	Osaka, Osaka	Japan	Grand Cafe
28 January 2001	Hakata, Fukuoka	Japan	Q's
1 February 2001	Roppongi, Tokyo	Japan	Velfarre
2 February 2001	Utsunomiya, Tochigi	Japan	Club X
3 February 2001	Isesaki, Gunma	Japan	Club Luv
16 February 2001	Sapporo, Hokkaido	Japan	Club Plus
24 February 2001	Kyoto, Kyoto	Japan	CK Cafe

== Track listing ==
All lyrics are written by Rina Aiuchi

No.	Title	Music	Arrangers	Length
1.	"Be Happy?"	Masataka Kitaura	Kuuron Oshiro	4:23
2.	"Close to Your Heart"	Aika Ohno	Oshiro	5:02
3.	"Koi wa Thrill, Shock, Suspense" (恋はスリル、ショック、サスペンス)	Ohno	Kuuron Oshiro	4:56
4.	"Snow Drop"	Nami Kaneko	KCP	4:25
5.	"Her Lament: Dare ni mo Kikoenai Kanojo no Sakebi" (Her Lament ~誰にも聞こえない彼女の叫び~)	Miho Komatsu	KCP	4:03
6.	"It's Crazy for You"	Ohno	Oshiro	4:22
7.	"Can You Feel My...?"	Yuuichirou Iwai (New Cinema Tokage)	Oshiro	4:28
8.	"Ohh! Paradise Taste!!"	Ohno	Oshiro	4:26
9.	"Kimi e no Sayonara"	Watanuki	KCP	4:25
10.	"Dear...From..."	Masataka Kitaura	Oshiro	3:36
11.	"Be Happy."	Kaneko	Oshiro	3:27

== Personnel ==
Credits adapted from the liner notes of Be Happy.

- Rina Aiuchi – vocals, producer, backing vocals (track 1, 2, 5, 6, 8, 9, 10)
- Aika Ohno - backing vocals (track 2, 3, 6, 8)
- Secil Minami - backing vocals (track 4, 7, 10, 11)
- Yujirou - backing vocals (track 1)
- Koji Yamamoto - backing vocals (track 6)
- Takumi Ito - backing vocals (track 8)
- King Opal - rap (track 6, 8)
- Yoshinobu Ohga - guitar (track 1, 2, 3, 7, 10, 11)
- Kazuko Ikeda - director
- Akio Nakajima - mixing
- Taku Oyabu - mixing
- Katsuyuki Yoshimatsu - assistant engineer
- Masahiro Shimada - mastering
- Manabu Uemoto - art director, designer
- Teruo Hayashi - photographer
- Yumi Inui - hair and make-up artist
- Miwa Kamise - styling
- Kanonji - executive producer

== Charts ==
=== Weekly charts ===
Chart (2001)	Peak position
Japan (Oricon)	3

=== Year-end charts ===
Chart (2001)	Position
Japan (Oricon)	74

== Certification and sales ==
Region	Certification	Certified units/sales
Japan (RIAJ)	Gold	200,000^{^}
^{^} Shipments figures based on certification alone.
