= Atom shell =

Atom shell may refer to either what is properly called an electron shell or an atomic orbital that makes up an electron subshell.

Atom shell may also refer to:

- The final track of the album A City Dressed in Dynamite by American experimental rock band That Handsome Devil
- Electron (software framework), originally named Atom Shell
