= Ohh! Paradise Taste!! =

2000 single by Rina Aiuchi

Single by Rina Aiuchi

from the album Be Happy
- B-side: "Purple Haze"
- Released: July 26, 2000
- Recorded: 2001
- Genre: J-pop; Eurobeat
- Length: 4:23
- Label: Giza Studio
- Songwriters: Rina Aiuchi; Aika Ohno
- Producers: Rina Aiuchi; Kannonji

Rina Aiuchi singles chronology
"It's Crazy for You" (2000)	"Ohh! Paradise Taste!!" (2000)	"Koi wa Thrill, Shock, Suspense" (2000)

"Ohh! Paradise Taste!!" is a song by Japanese singer-songwriter Rina Aiuchi. It was released on 26 July 2000 through Giza Studio, as the third single from her debut album Be Happy. The song reached number twenty-three in Japan and has sold over 42,550 copies nationwide. The song served as the commercial song to the Japanese cup noodle brand, Check It Out!

== Commercial performance ==
"Ohh! Paradise Taste!!" has sold over 42,550 copies in Japan and peaked at number twenty-three on the Oricon weekly singles chart, which long had been Aiuchi's worst-charting single until her 2010 single "Hanabi" peaked at number twenty-eight.

== Track listing ==
CD single
No.	Title	Writer(s)	Arranger(s)	Length
1.	"Ohh! Paradise Taste!!"	Rina Aiuchi; Aika Ohno	Kuuron Oshiro	4:23
2.	"Purple Haze"	Aiuchi; Mina Kaneko	KCP	4:52
3.	"Ohh! Paradise Taste!!" ("Manatsu na Yoru no Nippon no Natsu" na Mix... Nanchatte)	Aiuchi; Ohno	Division of Mark	4:26
4.	"Golden Moonlight" (Gran dale Euro Mix)	Aiuchi; Ohno	KCP	4:12
5.	"Ohh! Paradise Taste!!" (Instrumental)	Aiuchi; Ohno	Oshiro	4:23

== Charts ==
Chart (2000)	Peak position
Japan (Oricon)	23

== Certification and sales ==
Region	Certification	Certified units/sales
Japan (RIAJ)	None	42,550

== Release history ==
Region	Date	Format	Catalogue Num.	Label	Ref.
Japan	26 July 2000	CD	GZCA-1041	Giza Studio	
