= Dawin =

American musician (born 1990)

- Born: Dawin Polanco; December 12, 1990 (age 35); Brooklyn, New York, U.S.
- Genres: Pop; hip hop; trap; R&B; electronic
- Occupations: Singer; songwriter; rapper; record producer
- Instruments: Vocals; guitar; piano; bass guitar
- Years active: 2010–present
- Labels: Casablanca; Republic; AWAL; Artcade
- Website: officialdawin.com

Dawin Polanco (born December 12, 1990), known mononymously as Dawin, is an American singer, songwriter, rapper and record producer from Brooklyn, New York. He is best known for the song "Dessert", which reached number 68 on the Billboard Hot 100.

== Career ==
Dawin's debut single, "Just Girly Things", was released in 2014. It reached the top 40 of the Dance/Electronic Songs chart in the United States, and was used in a number of Vines, which led him to sign a record deal in 2014. In 2015, he released the single "Dessert". Released in both a solo version and a version featuring Silentó, it reached the top 10 in Australia and New Zealand, and was certified platinum in the U.S.

In 2016, he released his second EP, Sunday. In 2017, he released his debut album, Errors.

== Discography ==
=== Albums ===
- Errors (2017)
- Memory Card (2019)

=== Extended plays ===
- Dessert (2015)
- Sunday (2016)
- Eternity (2022)
- Blow Me Away (2022)
- On Top of Me (2023)

=== Singles ===
Title	Year	Peak chart positions								Certifications	Album
Title	Year	US	US Dance	AUS	CAN	DEN	NZ	SWE	UK	Certifications	Album
"Just Girly Things"	2014	—	28	—	—	—	—	—	—		Dessert EP
"Dessert" (solo or featuring Silentó)	2015	68	5	7	74	17	6	80	35	RIAA: Platinum; ARIA: 4× Platinum; BPI: Silver; GLF: Gold; IFPI DEN: Platinum; MC: Gold; RMNZ: 2× Platinum	Dessert EP
"Life of the Party"	2016	—	—	—	—	—	—	—	—		Dessert EP
"Throwback"	2016	—	—	—	—	—	—	—	—		Non-album single
"Jumpshot"	2016	—	—	—	—	—	—	—	—		Sunday EP
"Sidekick"	2016	—	—	—	—	—	—	—	—		Sunday EP
"Errors"	2016	—	—	—	—	—	—	—	—		Errors
"Cut 'Em Off"	2017	—	—	—	—	—	—	—	—		Errors
"Lift You Up"	2017	—	—	—	—	—	—	—	—		Non-album single
"Road Trip"	2018	—	—	—	—	—	—	—	—		Non-album single
"Darkest Moment"	2019	—	—	—	—	—	—	—	—		Non-album single
"Fingertips"	2019	—	—	—	—	—	—	—	—		Non-album single
"Substitute"	2020	—	—	—	—	—	—	—	—		Non-album single
"Prima Donna"	2020	—	—	—	—	—	—	—	—		Non-album single
"Encendia"	2020	—	—	—	—	—	—	—	—		Non-album single
"Block"	2020	—	—	—	—	—	—	—	—		Non-album single
"Everything About You"	2021	—	—	—	—	—	—	—	—		Non-album single
"Cherries"	2021	—	—	—	—	—	—	—	—		Non-album single
"Sleepwalk"	2021	—	—	—	—	—	—	—	—		Non-album single
"Both Wrong"	2021	—	—	—	—	—	—	—	—		Non-album single
"Handful"	2021	—	—	—	—	—	—	—	—		Non-album single
"Go Getter"	2022	—	—	—	—	—	—	—	—		Eternity EP
"Eternity"	2022	—	—	—	—	—	—	—	—		Eternity EP
"Blow Me Away"	2022	—	—	—	—	—	—	—	—		Blow Me Away EP
"Click Clack Boom"	2022	—	—	—	—	—	—	—	—		Non-album single
"Break the Curse"	2022	—	—	—	—	—	—	—	—		Non-album single
"On Top of Me	2023	—	—	—	—	—	—	—	—		On Top of Me EP
"Up to Speed"	2023	—	—	—	—	—	—	—	—		Non-album single
"Thickanie"	2023	—	—	—	—	—	—	—	—		Non-album single
"Origami"	2024	—	—	—	—	—	—	—	—		Non-album single
"Bikini Body II"	2024	—	—	—	—	—	—	—	—		Non-album single
"HFTT"	2024	—	—	—	—	—	—	—	—		Non-album single
"Agave"	2025	—	—	—	—	—	—	—	—		Non-album single
"Gamble"	2025	—	—	—	—	—	—	—	—		Non-album single
"Chika"	2025	—	—	—	—	—	—	—	—		Non-album single
"Three Thousand Forty"	2025	—	—	—	—	—	—	—	—		Non-album single
"Angelitos"	2025	—	—	—	—	—	—	—	—		Non-album single
"—" denotes a recording that did not chart or was not released in that territory.

== Filmography ==
=== Television ===
Year	Title	Role	Notes
2016	Eat Bulaga!	Himself	Episode: "5 Days to Go!"
