= Dessert (song) =

2015 single by Dawin

Single by Dawin

from the EP Dessert
- Released: March 17, 2015
- Recorded: 2014
- Genre: Dance; electronic
- Length: 3:30 (original); 3:31 (remix)
- Label: Casablanca; Republic
- Songwriters: Dawin Polanco; Ricky Hawk (remix only); Bolo Da Producer (remix only)
- Producer: Dawin

Dawin singles chronology
"Just Girly Things" (2014)	"Dessert" (2015)	"Life of the Party" (2016)

Silentó singles chronology
"Lightning in a Bottle" (2015)	"Dessert" (2015)	"Girl in the Mirror" (2016)

Lyric video
- "Dessert" on YouTube

Music video
- "Dessert (Remix)" on YouTube

"Dessert" is a song by American singer and producer Dawin. It was released on March 17, 2015.

A remix of the song features American rapper Silentó.

== Music video ==
The music video for the remix was released on October 19, 2015 on Dawin's YouTube via Vevo and features Silentó. YouTube personality Rosanna Pansino also appears in the video.

As of February 2025, the remix music video has received over 256 million views and the original song's lyric video has surpassed 149 million views on YouTube.

== Live performances ==
Dawin performed the song live on the Filipino noontime variety show Eat Bulaga! in March 2016.

== Charts ==
Chart (2015–16)	Peak position
Australia (ARIA)	7
Canada Hot 100 (Billboard)	74
Czech Republic Airplay (ČNS IFPI)	77
Denmark (Tracklisten)	17
Germany (GfK)	100
Ireland (IRMA)	81
New Zealand (Recorded Music NZ)	6
Sweden (Sverigetopplistan)	80
UK Singles (Official Charts)	35
US Billboard Hot 100	68
US Digital Song Sales (Billboard)	41
US Hot Dance/Electronic Songs (Billboard)	5
US Rhythmic Airplay (Billboard)	24

=== Year-end charts ===
Chart (2015)	Position
Australia (ARIA)	58
US Hot Dance/Electronic Songs (Billboard)	41
Chart (2016)	Position
US Hot Dance/Electronic Songs (Billboard)	22

== Certifications ==
Region	Certification	Certified units/sales
Australia (ARIA)	4× Platinum	280,000^{‡}
Brazil (Pro-Música Brasil)	Gold	30,000^{‡}
Canada (Music Canada)	Gold	40,000^{*}
Denmark (IFPI Danmark)	Platinum	90,000^{‡}
New Zealand (RMNZ)	2× Platinum	60,000^{‡}
Sweden (GLF)	Gold	20,000^{‡}
United Kingdom (BPI)	Silver	200,000^{‡}
United States (RIAA)	Platinum	1,000,000^{‡}
^{*} Sales figures based on certification alone.^{‡} Sales+streaming figures based on certification alone.

== Release history ==
List of release dates, showing region, formats, label and reference
Region	Date	Format(s)	Version	Label	Ref.
United States	October 13, 2015	Contemporary hit radio	Silentó Remix	Casablanca; Republic	
