= Koi wa Thrill, Shock, Suspense =

Single by Rina Aiuchi

from the album Be Happy
- B-side: "Hikari Iro no Kakera"
- Released: October 25, 2000
- Recorded: 2000
- Genre: J-pop
- Length: 4:55
- Label: Giza Studio
- Songwriter(s): Rina Aiuchi; Aika Ohno
- Producer(s): Rina Aiuchi; Kannonji

Rina Aiuchi singles chronology
"Ohh! Paradise Taste!!" (2000)	"Koi wa Thrill, Shock, Suspense" (2000)	"Faith" (2001)

"Koi wa Thrill, Shock, Suspense" (恋はスリル、ショック、サスペンス, lit. "Love is Thrill, Shock, and Suspense") is a song by Japanese singer-songwriter Rina Aiuchi. It was released on 25 October 2000 through Giza Studio, as the fourth single from her debut album Be Happy. The song served as the theme song to the Japanese animated television series Case Closed.

== Commercial performance ==
"Koi wa Thrill, Shock, Suspense" peaked at number five on the Oricon Weekly Singles Chart, becoming Aiuchi's first top ten single. The single has sold 105,260 copies and remains as the singer's second best-selling single, behind "Navy Blue" (2001).

== Track listing ==
No.	Title	Writer(s)	Arranger(s)	Length
1.	"Koi wa Thrill, Shock, Suspense"	Rina Aiuchi; Aika Ohno	Kuuron Oshiro	4:55
2.	"Hikari Iro no Kakera"	Aiuchi; Yuichiro Iwata	Oshiro
3.	"Koi wa Thrill, Shock, Suspense" (KH-R Jr Starlight Mix Ver. S)	Aiuchi; Ohno	KH-R
4.	"Purple Haze" (Future Techno Mix)	Aiuchi; Ohno	Oshiro
5.	"Koi wa Thrill, Shock, Suspense" (Instrumental)	Aiuchi; Ohno	Oshiro

== Charts ==
Chart (2000)	Peak position
Japan (Oricon)	5

== Certification and sales ==
Region	Certification	Certified units/sales
Japan (RIAJ)	Gold	105,260

== Release history ==
Region	Date	Format	Label
Japan	25 October 2000	CD single	Giza Studio
