= Hit Dem Folks =

Dance trend

Hit Dem Folks is an American hip-hop dance trend popularized in 2015. The move is characterized by a sequence of arm movements, including crossing the arms twice, raising them in a 'U' shape, and bending them inwards. The gesture became a cultural phenomenon, particularly through its dissemination on video-sharing platforms like YouTube, Instagram, Vine, and Dubsmash. The dance move, often performed to specific hip-hop tracks, has been embraced by dancers, athletes, celebrities, and other public figures, contributing to its viral spread and cultural significance. Hit Dem Folks is one of many dance trends to originate from Southern rap culture, with the dance duo, Ayo and Teo, having played a major role in popularizing the move.

== Origin ==
The dance is thought to have originated in Columbus, Georgia, in the early 2010s. A YouTube video filmed in 2011, and uploaded in 2015 features a man nicknamed "JacRabbit," performing a simpler version of the move, hinting at a potential role in the creation of the trend. Initially popularized among local dancers, Hit Dem Folks spread to the broader Atlanta street dance scene, a hub for Southern rap and hip-hop culture, where it gained significant traction. The dance's popularity was further amplified by its association with the 2015 track "Walked In" by Atlanta-based rapper Bankroll Fresh, which became the first widely recognized song to accompany the dance.

== Dance description ==
Hit Dem Folks consists of a brief sequence of arm movements rather than a fully choreographed routine. The dance involves a series of arm crosses followed by the signature "hit," where the performer raises their arms, bends them inward toward the center of the body, and often lifts one leg. Typically performed to hip-hop or trap music, the "hit" is synchronized with a specific beat in the track, resembling a flexing pose.

== Cultural impact and spread ==
Hit Dem Folks became a viral sensation in 2015, driven by its adoption on social media platforms, where dancers showcased the move in challenges and group dance videos. Hit Dem Folks influenced the development of a distinct format of dance videos that featured groups of dancers each taking turns performing their own, largely improvised, routines, rather than synchronized choreography. These routines initially only featured variations of Hit Dem Folks arm movements; over time, the sequences would come to involve pantomiming of song lyrics, usage of other dance trends, and elements of Memphis Jookin. Atlanta-based dance duo Meechie and Toosi were early adopters and contributed to the growth of dance circle-style videos.

The dance's dynamic arm movements and accessibility made it a staple in social media dance challenges, reflecting the broader influence of Southern rap culture on global hip-hop dance trends. To date, Hit Dem Folks and its associated group dance style have achieved global influence and continue to be featured on modern video-sharing platforms such as TikTok.

== Similar trends ==
Other Black dance trends include:

- Memphis Jookin
- Dougie
- Hit the Quan
- Nae-nae
- Juju on that Beat
- Milly Rock
- Woah
