= Watch Me (Whip/Nae Nae) =

2015 debut single by Silentó

Single by Silentó
- Released: May 5, 2015
- Recorded: 2014
- Genre: Snap
- Length: 3:05
- Label: Capitol
- Songwriters: Ricky Hawk; Timothy Mingo
- Producer: Bolo Da Producer

Silentó singles chronology
"Watch Me" (2015)	"Lightning in a Bottle" (2015)

Music video
- "Watch Me" on YouTube

"Watch Me" (also known as "Watch Me (Whip/Nae Nae)") is the debut single by American rapper Silentó. In March 2015, he was signed to Capitol Records, which released the track as a single with an accompanying music video. The song peaked at number three on the Billboard Hot 100, where it spent six non-consecutive weeks. With a viral clip on YouTube, the song was popular for its dance despite negative reviews, a combination of two popular moves cited in the title: the "Whip" and the "Nae Nae" as well as other hip hop dances from various songs, such as "Crank That (Soulja Boy)" and "Stanky Legg".

== Release ==
The song was released by Capitol Records on May 5, 2015.

=== Music video ===
Whip and Nae Nae performed at Six Flags Over Texas

The music video was uploaded online on Silentó's Vevo channel on YouTube on June 25, 2015, and shot in Atlanta, Georgia. It was directed by Marc Klasfeld. Set in a high school gymnasium, Silentó performs the dance moves mentioned in the song with dance crews, high school, and university cheerleaders, fans, even a trio of older conservative white women who later join in on the dance, and also incorporates videos sent in by viewers. Lil Scrappy and Rich White Ladies make guest appearances in the video. As of June 2025, it has surpassed 1.9 billion views on YouTube.

=== DanceOn campaign ===
Whip dance tutorial

Nae Nae dance tutorial

The digital media company DanceOn was crucial to the success of "Watch Me (Whip/Nae Nae)." After striking a deal with Silentó, DanceOn reached out to its network of dance content creators to make instructional videos to the song for their #WatchMeDanceOn campaign. 50 of their creators made videos that they then posted on YouTube. Instantly they gained popularity bringing in more than 250 million views in under three months. The campaign was launched on April 13, 2015, and by May 22, 2015, the track's sales tripled from 17,000 units a week to 42,000 a week.

== Reception ==
Whip and Nae Nae

=== Commercial ===
"Watch Me (Whip/Nae Nae)" peaked at number three on the Billboard Hot 100, where it has spent six non-consecutive weeks being kept from number one on the chart by songs such as "Cheerleader" by Omi and "Can't Feel My Face" by The Weeknd. It spent eighteen weeks in the top ten of that chart before dropping out on October 14, 2015. Streaming and downloads propped up its run on the chart the most, while radio play was only moderate. It reached number three on the download component chart and topped the streaming chart for ten weeks, while barely missing the top 20 for the radio chart, peaking at 22. Internationally, the song has peaked within the top ten of the charts in Australia, as well as the top twenty of the charts in Denmark, New Zealand and the United Kingdom. The song reached over 2 million in sales by November 2015, and has sold 2,440,000 copies as of June 2016.

=== Critical ===
Elliot Wilson listed it #2 on his list of 15 worst singles. Complex called it "one of the most annoying things to ever exist", and listed it among their "Songs We Hated in 2015".

It received a nomination for Song of the Summer at the 2015 MTV Video Music Awards and another nomination for R&B/Hip-Hop Song at the Teen Choice Awards.

=== Covers and adaptations ===
In 2015, the Australian group The Janoskians released a parody of the song titled "We Don't (Whip/Nae Nae)".

== Charts ==
=== Weekly charts ===
Weekly chart performance for "Watch Me (Whip/Nae Nae)"
Chart (2015–2016)	Peak position
Australia (ARIA)	9
Austria (Ö3 Austria Top 40)	65
Belgium (Ultratop Flanders)	31
Belgium Urban (Ultratop Flanders)	6
Belgium (Ultratop Wallonia)	41
Canada Hot 100 (Billboard)	15
Canada CHR/Top 40 (Billboard)	46
Czech Republic Singles Digital (ČNS IFPI)	40
Denmark (Tracklisten)	16
France (SNEP)	19
Germany (GfK)	50
Ireland (IRMA)	35
Italy (FIMI)	95
Netherlands (Dutch Top 40)	17
Netherlands (Single Top 100)	17
New Zealand (Recorded Music NZ)	11
Portugal (AFP)	100
Slovakia Singles Digital (ČNS IFPI)	43
South Africa Airplay (EMA)	6
Spain (Promusicae)	82
Sweden (Sverigetopplistan)	52
Switzerland (Schweizer Hitparade)	41
UK Singles (Official Charts)	19
UK Hip Hop/R&B (Official Charts)	2
US Billboard Hot 100	3
US Dance Airplay (Billboard)	24
US Latin Airplay (Billboard)	36
US Hot R&B/Hip-Hop Songs (Billboard)	2
US Pop Airplay (Billboard)	18
US Rhythmic Airplay (Billboard)	3

=== Year-end charts ===
2015 year-end chart performance for "Watch Me (Whip/Nae Nae)"
Chart (2015)	Position
Australia (ARIA)	52
Belgium Urban (Ultratop Flanders)	29
Canada (Canadian Hot 100)	42
Denmark (Tracklisten)	60
France (SNEP)	62
Netherlands (Dutch Top 40)	89
Netherlands (Single Top 100)	95
New Zealand (Recorded Music NZ)	48
US Billboard Hot 100	8
US Hot R&B/Hip-Hop Songs (Billboard)	3
US Rhythmic (Billboard)	29

2016 year-end chart performance for "Watch Me (Whip/Nae Nae)"
Chart (2016)	Position
Brazil (Brasil Hot 100)	69
Canada (Canadian Hot 100)	99
US Billboard Hot 100	88

=== Decade-end charts ===
2010s-end chart performance for "Watch Me (Whip/Nae Nae)"
Chart (2010–2019)	Position
US Billboard Hot 100	81
US Hot R&B/Hip-Hop Songs (Billboard)	32

== Certifications ==
Certifications and sales for "Watch Me (Whip/Nae Nae)"
Region	Certification	Certified units/sales
Australia (ARIA)	2× Platinum	140,000^{‡}
Brazil (Pro-Música Brasil)	3× Diamond	750,000^{‡}
Canada (Music Canada)	2× Platinum	160,000^{*}
Denmark (IFPI Danmark)	Platinum	60,000^{^}
Germany (BVMI)	Gold	200,000^{‡}
Italy (FIMI)	Gold	25,000^{‡}
New Zealand (RMNZ)	Platinum	15,000^{*}
Poland (ZPAV)	Platinum	20,000^{‡}
Sweden (GLF)	Gold	20,000^{‡}
United Kingdom (BPI)	Platinum	600,000^{‡}
United States (RIAA)	6× Platinum	6,000,000^{‡}
^{*} Sales figures based on certification alone.^{^} Shipments figures based on certification alone.^{‡} Sales+streaming figures based on certification alone.
