= We Are Toonz =

American hip hop group

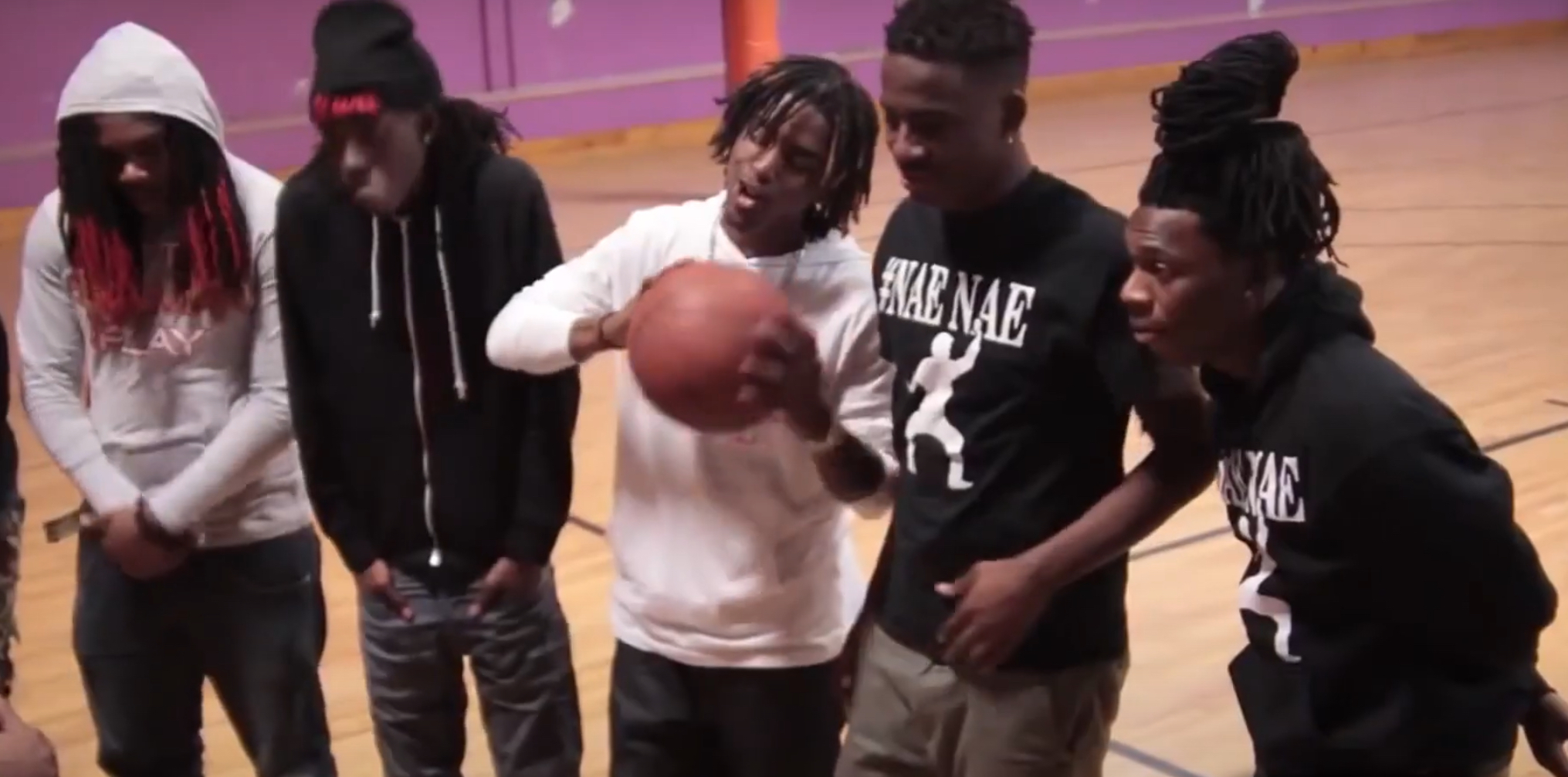
- We Are Toonz members, 2014

Background information
- Origin: Stone Mountain, Georgia
- Genres: Hip-Hop, Pop-rap
- Years active: 2013–2015
- Labels: VPP, Epic, Sony
- Members: Calvin Larmar "Callamar" Glass; Kavin "K.B." Bing-Gardner; Christopher "Crash Bandit" Major; Tavin "Levi" Bing-Gardner
- Website: WeAreToonz.com

We Are Toonz is an American hip hop group from Stone Mountain, Georgia, formed in 2013, known for the viral debut dance single "Drop That #NaeNae", inspired by Martin Lawrence's character Sheneneh Jenkins from his popular 1990's sitcom Martin.

== Music career ==
=== Social media influence ===
We Are Toonz released Drop That #NaeNae in 2013 without much fanfare. The group posted a video of themselves performing the #NaeNae Dance on the social video sharing website Vine and other social media websites like Instagram, Twitter and YouTube. As the song gained momentum the Drop That #NaeNae went viral. The Michigan State Football team can be seen dropping that #NaeNae on YouTube, and breaking down the #NaeNae dance on Vine. Video postings from other college teams dropping that #NaeNae to foster team spirit started going viral as well, Ohio State, Temple University, Auburn University, Notre Dame, and Mercer Bear basketball team victory #NaeNae over Duke's Blue Devils.

Houston Rockets', Dwight Howard posted videos of himself dropping the #NaeNae. After which, he reached out to the group to record a video in Atlanta. Washington Wizards', John Wall celebrated his slam dunk contest win by dropping that "NaeNae" with Paul George. Due to the Vines, videos and GIFs the group saw a 311% spike in mentions of the #NaeNae hashtag.

In August 2014, Coca-Cola released a commercial featuring We Are Toonz for their Ahh Campaign targeting the teen and young adult demographic. We Are Toonz are the first hip-hop act to collaborate with Coca-Cola since R&B singer Tyrese Gibson. The group was selected by the brand after seeing them perform at the World of Coke Ahh stage at the 2013 BET Hip-Hop Awards.

== Discography ==
=== Singles ===
Single	Year	Label
"Drop That #NaeNae"	2013	VPP, Epic
"Drop That #NaeNae Remix" (featuring Lil Jon, French Montana & T-Pain)	2014	VPP, Epic
"DJ Play My Song" (featuring Mike Epps)	2014	VPP, Epic
"Lit Up" (featuring Jazze Pha)	2015	VPP
