= Drop That NaeNae =

Single by We Are Toonz
- Released: November 29, 2013
- Genre: Pop-rap
- Length: 3:57
- Label: Epic
- Songwriter(s): Gregory Solomon; Tavin Gardner; Kavin Gardner; Calvin Glass; DeAndre Johnson
- Producer(s): G-Cutz

"Drop That NaeNae" (stylized as "Drop That #NaeNae") is a song by American hip hop group We Are Toonz. Released on November 29, 2013, the song gained popularity in early 2014 thanks to its accompanying dance, created by the PjTheKing.

== The NaeNae dance ==
The song's eponymous dance was created by "PjTheKing." in (KoolasLevi) basement, which was a practice space they used while preparing for a show, and uploaded an instructive YouTube video on how to do the dance on July 6, 2013.

=== Rise in popularity ===
The group first caught the eye of Amin (Pop) Miller Veteran music Producer and his wife Jenequa Bing Miller, The NaeNae dance became a viral hit, gaining traction on social media sites such as YouTube, Instagram, Twitter and Vine. Washington Wizards player John Wall broke into the dance after winning the NBA Slam Dunk Contest on February 15, 2014, leading to a 311% increase in Twitter mentions of the #NaeNae hashtag that day. Other sports personalities, including Lance Moore of the New Orleans Saints, Dwight Howard of the Houston Rockets, and the Michigan State Spartans college football team, were also filmed dancing to the song. Howard later met with We Are Toonz and recorded a video of himself dancing with the group. It was also incorporated into a dance medley during Pharrell Williams' performance of "Happy" at the 86th Academy Awards. The dance garnered further national attention when Kevin Canevari of the Mercer University men's basketball team performed it at the 2014 NCAA Men's Division I Basketball Tournament, following his team's upset victory over third-seed Duke.

== Commercial performance ==
The popularity of the NaeNae dance led to radio and sales traction of "Drop That NaeNae", and the song later debuted at numbers 20 and 38 on the Billboard Hot R&B/Hip-Hop Songs and Hot Rap Songs charts, respectively.

== Remixes ==
The official remix of "Drop That NaeNae" was released on May 24, 2014, and features American R&B singer T-Pain and rappers Lil Jon and French Montana.

== Charts ==
Chart (2014)	Peak position
Belgium (Ultratop Flanders Urban)	48
US Bubbling Under Hot 100 (Billboard)	18
US Hot R&B/Hip-Hop Songs (Billboard)	36
US Hot Rap Songs (Billboard)	20
