= Detective Conan: Quarter of Silence =

- Theatrical release poster
- Kanji: 名探偵コナン 沈黙の15分(クォーター)
- Revised Hepburn: Meitantei Konan: Chinmoku no Kwōtā
- Directed by: Yasuichiro Yamamoto; Kobun Shizuno
- Written by: Kazunari Kochi
- Based on: Case Closed by Gosho Aoyama
- Produced by: Masahito Yoshioka; Michihiko Suwa
- Starring: Minami Takayama; Kappei Yamaguchi; Rikiya Koyama; Wakana Yamazaki; Megumi Hayashibara; Yukiko Iwai; Ikue Ohtani; Wataru Takagi; Naoko Matsui; Kenichi Ogata; Kouki Miyata; Keiichi Nanba; Mayumi Iizuka; Toshihiko Seki
- Cinematography: Ryosuke Miki
- Edited by: Ikuyo Fujita; Kazuki Kosuda
- Music by: Katsuo Ono; Aki Yokoyama; Masakazu Yokoyama
- Production company: TMS Entertainment
- Distributed by: Toho
- Release date: April 16, 2011
- Running time: 109 minutes
- Country: Japan
- Language: Japanese
- Box office: $47 million

Detective Conan: Quarter of Silence (名探偵コナン 沈黙の15分(クォーター), Meitantei Konan: Chinmoku no Kwōtā) is a 2011 Japanese animated mystery thriller film and the fifteenth film installment of the Case Closed manga and anime series . The film was released on April 16, 2011. This film celebrates the fifteenth anniversary of the anime. Magic File 2011, ties in with the film and was released on the same day as the film's premiere.

== Plot ==
The Governor of Tokyo, Yuuichiro Asakura, receives a threatening letter the day before the opening of Tohto Line, a new train line for the Tokyo Metro. During the opening ceremony of the line, Conan Edogawa and the Detective Boys are driven by Dr. Agasa and pass under the Tohto Line. Conan, having heard about the threatening letter, notices explosives connected to the Tohto railway; Using his original voice to inform Juzo Megure as Shinichi Kudo, he, Miwako Sato and Wataru Takagi are able to stop the train and divert traffic away from the explosives preventing any deaths.

Conan researches Asakura's political history for a clue on the culprit and learns the governor was in charge of the construction of dam in Kitanosawa, a fictional town in the Niigata Prefecture. Due to the dam's construction, the citizens of Kitanosawa were forced into a new town and their old homes were drowned by the dam. Since Asakura's trip to celebrate the anniversary of the dam is canceled by the bombing, Conan speculates information on the bomber could be found in Kitanosawa and plans a trip there.

Conan, the Detective Boys, Ran, Kogoro Mouri, and Sonoko Suzuki travel to Kitanosawa and enjoy the day playing. They are introduced to a group of locals; Keisuke Yamao, Mizuki Toono, Fuyumi Tachihara, Takehiki Mutou, and Shougo Hikawa. The group reveals they were all childhood friends and were part of the group which relocated to the new village. They also reveal it is their first gathering in eight years since Yamao was in prison for killing Toono's sister, Natsuki Toono, in a hit and run. The next day, Tachihara's son, Touma, awakens from his eight-year coma with no memory of his accident. Later that day, Hikawa is found dead in a field. Originally, it was assumed to be suicide since only Hikawa's footprints were found in the snow. Conan reveals Hikawa was killed by an electroshock weapon. The culprit then waited for it to snow and walked away backwards to suggest Hikawa was alone. During a diamond dust caused by the sunrise, Touma experiences a flashback on the day of the accident.

Conan investigates Hikawa's belongings and finds a newspaper clipping detailing a jewelry store was robbed the day before the hit and run. A cell site is destroyed by bombs leading Conan to hypothesize who the possible culprit is. Meanwhile, the Detective Boys and Touma are hunted down by a sniper. Conan intervenes and leads them to safety. Taking a route towards the dam, Conan explains Yamao is the culprit. Yamao robbed the jewelry store in a distant town and drives back to Kitanosawa. On the way, he runs over Natsuki, a scene which Touma notices. Touma is then chased by Yamao and sees the diamonds, explaining why the diamond dust startled his memories. Touma escapes but falls down a cliff leading to his coma. Yamao then buries the jewels in a property in Kitanosawa and turns himself over to the authorities for Natsuki's death. Unexpectedly, the dam project forced the town of Kitanosawa underwater. As a result, Yamao decides to bomb the dam to search old-Kitanosawa for the diamonds. In order to have enough time to perform the search, he had to cancel Asakura's trip and destroy the cell site to prevent the outside world from learning off the dam's destruction.

Upon arriving at the dam, Conan is pursued by Yamao who intends to kill him. Before Yamao was about kill Conan, Toono shoots Yamao in the shoulder, incapacitating him. After Conan tranquilized Yamao when he strangling Toono, Touma regains his memories of the accident upon seeing Toono and reveals he saw Toono push Natsuki off into the road. Toono professes she was the sniper attempting to kill Touma and that the death of her sister was an accident. Yamao, having set off the bombs in the dam after he got tranquilized, forcing them to flee. Conan diverges from the group intending to start an avalanche by creating grooves in a steep mountain with his motorized snowboard to divert the flow away from Kitanosawa. He is successful but his motor short-circuits causing him to be caught in the avalanche. He is eventually free when Ran calls Shinichi's cellphone, causing him to regain consciousness to alert the others of his position.

In the post-credits scene, Yamao confesses the everything he has caused to the polices after the briefcase containing the jewel was found in his original home, while Toono getting arrested for the accidental murder she caused eight years ago and Touma, with his memories hasn't fully recovered, being comforted by his friends.

== Cast ==
- Minami Takayama as Conan Edogawa
  - Kappei Yamaguchi as Shinichi Kudo
- Rikiya Koyama as Kogoro Mouri
- Wakana Yamazaki as Ran Mouri
- Megumi Hayashibara as Ai Haibara
- Naoko Matsui as Sonoko Suzuki
- Kazuhiko Inoue as Ninzaburou Shiratori
- Kenichi Ogata as Dr. Hiroshi Agasa
- Chafurin as Juzo Megure
- Wataru Takagi as Genta Kojima and Wataru Takagi
- Yukiko Iwai as Ayumi Yoshida
- Ikue Ohtani as Mitsuhiko Tsuburaya
- Atsuko Yuya as Miwako Sato
- Isshin Chiba as Kazunobu Chiba
- Keiichi Nanba as Keisuke Yamao
- Kouki Miyata as Touma Tachihara
- Mayumi Iizuka as Fuyumi Tachihara
- Toshihiko Seki as Shougo Hikawa

== Production ==
The film was announced to be in the making at the end of the fourteenth film, The Lost Ship in the Sky. The details of the film were announced on the official film website on September 30, 2014. On March 5, 2011, the site was updated again revealing the 90 second trailer and the theme song.

In an interview with the Japanese magazine Otonafami, Gosho Aoyama revealed the setting is the snowy mountains due to the fact survivors will die in 15 minutes when buried under an avalanche.

=== Music ===
The official soundtrack of the film is conducted by Ono Katsuo and released on April 13, 2011. The theme song used for this film is "Don't Wanna Lie" by B'z.
