= List of Case Closed episodes (seasons 1–15) =

First 465 episodes of Case Closed

First North American anime key visual featuring Ran Mori (Rachel Moore), Genta Kojima (George Kaminski), Mitsuhiko Tsuburaya (Mitch Tennison), Ayumi Yoshida (Amy Yeager) (left), Conan Edogawa (center), Dr. Hiroshi Agasa (Dr. Herschel Agasa), Juzo Megure (Joseph Meguire), and Kogoro Mori (Richard Moore) (right)

The Case Closed anime series, known as Meitantei Conan (名探偵コナン, lit. Great Detective Conan, officially translated as Detective Conan) in its original release in Japan, is based on the manga series of the same name by Gosho Aoyama. It was localized in English as Case Closed by Funimation due to unspecified legal problems. The anime is produced by TMS Entertainment and Yomiuri Telecasting Corporation with the directors being Kenji Kodama, Yasuichiro Yamamoto, Masato Satō, Kōjin Ochi, and Nobuharu Kamanaka. The series follows the teenage detective Jimmy Kudo, who transforms into a child after being poisoned with APTX 4869 by the Black Organization. Now named Conan Edogawa and living with the Moores, Conan solves murders during his daily life as he awaits the day to defeat the Black Organization.

Case Closed premiered on January 8, 1996 on Yomiuri TV, Nippon Television and their affiliates in Japan and is currently ongoing. It has aired over 1100 episodes in Japan making it the fifteenth longest running anime series. In 2010, Yomiuri Telecasting Corporation began making the episodes available for video on demand. The anime spun off theatrical films, two OVA series and a TV special titled Lupin the 3rd vs Detective Conan, these spin offs were created with the same staff and cast as the anime series. The theme music supplier for the series was initially Universal Music Group, whom released the first two openings and ending theme songs, and is currently Being Incorporated.

In 2003, the first 104 episodes were licensed by Funimation for distribution in North America under the name Case Closed where it debuted on Cartoon Network's Adult Swim programming block on May 24, 2004, no more than 50 episodes were licensed from Funimation due to low ratings. The Canadian channel YTV picked up the Case Closed series and broadcast 22 episodes between April 7, 2006, and September 2, 2006, before taking it off the air. Funimation made the series available with the launch of the Funimation Channel in November 2005 and was temporarily available on Colours TV during its syndication with the Funimation Channel. Funimation began streaming Case Closed episodes on their website in March 2013.

A separate English adaptation of the series by Animax Asia premiered in the Philippines on January 18, 2006, under the name Detective Conan. Because Animax were unable to obtain further TV broadcast rights, their version comprised 52 episodes. The series continued with reruns until August 7, 2006, when it was removed from the station. Meitantei Conan has also been localized in other languages such as French, German, and Italian. As of 2018, the Detective Conan anime has been broadcast in 40 countries around the world.Although Cartoon Network stopped ordering episodes, Funimation continued to dub the series direct-to-DVD and episodes 1–4 and 53–83 were released on eleven DVD volumes released between August 24, 2004, and July 26, 2005. Funimation then redesigned its DVD volumes and episodes 1–52 were released in eight DVD volumes between February 21, 2006, and May 29, 2007. The series was later released in five seasonal DVD boxes between July 22, 2008, and May 12, 2009, containing 130 episodes in total. The seasonal boxes were then re-released as a part of Funimation's Viridian Edition line between July 14, 2009, and March 23, 2010. Then they were re-released as part of Funimation's Super Amazing Value Edition (S.A.V.E.) line on July 23, 2013.

== Seasons overview ==
These "seasons" are based on the Japanese DVDs released by Shogakukan starting on October 25, 2000. (see Home media release section) In Japan, Case Closed runs continuously on TV with very few weeks off.

Season	Episodes	Originally released	
Season	Episodes	First released	Last released
1	28	January 8, 1996	August 12, 1996
2	26	August 19, 1996	April 14, 1997
3	28	April 21, 1997	November 24, 1997
4	24	December 1, 1997	June 22, 1998
5	28	June 29, 1998	February 8, 1999
6	28	February 15, 1999	September 27, 1999
7	31	October 11, 1999	June 5, 2000
8	26	June 12, 2000	January 8, 2001
9	35	December 11, 2000	October 22, 2001
10	31	October 29, 2001	July 8, 2002
11	30	July 15, 2002	April 14, 2003
12	38	April 21, 2003	March 1, 2004
13	36	March 8, 2004	February 21, 2005
14	37	February 28, 2005	January 16, 2006
15	39	January 23, 2006	February 19, 2007

== Episodes ==
=== Season 1 (1996) ===
Orig.^{Jp.}	Funi.^{Eng.}	No. in season	Crunchyroll translated title/Funimation title Original Japanese title	Directed by	Written by	Original release date	English air date
1	1	1	"The Roller Coaster Murder Case" / "The Big Shrink"; Transliteration: "Jetto Kōsutā Satsujin Jiken" (Japanese: ジェットコースター殺人事件)	Kenji Kodama	Hiroshi Kashiwabara	January 8, 1996	May 24, 2004
2	2	2	"The Kidnapping of the Company President's Daughter" / "The Kidnapped Debutante"; Transliteration: "Shachō Reijō Yūkai Jiken" (Japanese: 社長令嬢誘拐事件)	Toshiya Shinohara	Hiroshi Kashiwabara	January 15, 1996	May 25, 2004
3	3	3	"A Murder Behind the Locked Doors of a Celebrity's Apartment" / "Beware of Idols"; Transliteration: "Aidoru Misshitsu Satsujin Jiken" (Japanese: アイドル密室殺人事件)	Masato Sato	Junichi Miyashita	January 22, 1996	May 26, 2004
4	4	4	"The Case of the Coded City Map" / "Fish Marks the Spot"; Transliteration: "Dai Tokai Angō Mappu Jiken" (Japanese: 大都会暗号マップ事件)	Hirohito Ochi	Kazunari Kochi	January 29, 1996	May 27, 2004
5	5	5	"The Great Bullet Train Explosion" / "The Time Bomb Express"; Transliteration: "Shinkansen Dai Bakuha Jiken" (Japanese: 新幹線大爆破事件)	Johei Matsura	Junichi Miyashita	February 5, 1996	May 31, 2004
6	6	6	"The Valentine Murder Case" / "Tragic Valentine"; Transliteration: "Barentain Satsujin Jiken" (Japanese: バレンタイン殺人事件)	Yuji Yamaguchi	Toshiki Inoue	February 12, 1996	June 1, 2004
7	7	7	"The Threatening Monthly Presents" / "The Case of the Mysterious Gifts"; Transliteration: "Tsuki'ichi Purezento Kyōhaku Jiken" (Japanese: 月いちプレゼント脅迫事件)	Hirohito Ochi	Junichi Miyashita	February 19, 1996	June 2, 2004
8	8	8	"The Murder of the Art Museum Owner" / "The Art Museum Murder Case"; Transliteration: "Bijutsukan Ōnā Satsujin Jiken" (Japanese: 美術館オーナー殺人事件)	Keitaro Motonaga	Kazunari Kochi	February 26, 1996	June 3, 2004
9	9	9	"The Tenkaichi Night Festival Murder" / "Festival Fiasco"; Transliteration: "Tenkaichi Yomatsuri Satsujin Jiken" (Japanese: 天下一夜祭殺人事件)	Masato Sato	Kazunari Kochi	March 4, 1996	June 7, 2004
10	10	10	"The Blackmailed Pro Soccer Player" / "Deadly Game"; Transliteration: "Puro Sakkā Senshu Kyōhaku Jiken" (Japanese: プロサッカー選手脅迫事件)	Johei Matsura	Toshiki Inoue	March 11, 1996	June 8, 2004
11	11	11	"The Piano Sonata "Moonlight" Murders^{1 hr.}" / "The Moonlight Sonata Murder Case (Part 1)"; Transliteration: "Piano Sonata "Gekkō" Satsujin Jiken" (Japanese: ピアノソナタ「月光」殺人事件)	Ikuro Sato Yuji Yamaguchi	N/A	April 8, 1996	June 9, 2004
11	12	12	"The Piano Sonata "Moonlight" Murders^{1 hr.}" / "The Moonlight Sonata Murder Case (Part 2)"; Transliteration: "Piano Sonata "Gekkō" Satsujin Jiken" (Japanese: ピアノソナタ「月光」殺人事件)	Ikuro Sato Yuji Yamaguchi	N/A	April 8, 1996	June 10, 2004
12	13	13	"Ayumi-chan's Abduction" / "Kidnapped: Amy"; Transliteration: "Ayumi-chan Yūkai Jiken" (Japanese: 歩美ちゃん誘拐事件)	Hirohito Ochi	Junichi Miyashita	April 15, 1996	June 14, 2004
13	14	14	"The Bizarre Manhunt Murder" / "Mystery Mastermind"; Transliteration: "Kimyō na Hito Sagashi Satsujin Jiken" (Japanese: 奇妙な人捜し殺人事件)	Johei Matsura	Yuichi Higurashi	April 22, 1996	June 15, 2004
14	15	15	"The Mysterious Sniper Message Case" / "The Shooter"; Transliteration: "Nazo no Messēji Sogeki Jiken" (Japanese: 謎のメッセージ狙撃事件)	Masato Sato	Kazunari Kochi	April 29, 1996	June 16, 2004
15	16	16	"The Missing Corpse Murder" / "The Two-Faced Brother"; Transliteration: "Kieta Shitai Satsujin Jiken" (Japanese: 消えた死体殺人事件)	Ikuro Sato	Kuchiru Kazehara	May 13, 1996	June 17, 2004
16	17	17	"The Antique Collector Murder" / "A Loan Repaid"; Transliteration: "Kottōhin Korekutā Satsujin Jiken" (Japanese: 骨董品コレクター殺人事件)	Hirohito Ochi	Yasushi Hirano	May 20, 1996	June 21, 2004
17	18	18	"The Department Store Hijack" / "The Case of the Hi-Jacked Department Store"; Transliteration: "Depāto Jakku Jiken" (Japanese: デパートジャック事件)	Yasuhiro Minami	Junichi Miyashita	May 27, 1996	June 22, 2004
18	19	19	"The June Bride Murder Case" / "Wedding Day Blues"; Transliteration: "Rokugatsu no Hanayome Satsujin Jiken" (Japanese: 6月の花嫁殺人事件)	Johei Matsura	Kazunari Kochi	June 3, 1996	June 23, 2004
19	20	20	"The Elevator Murder Case" / "Fashion Sense"; Transliteration: "Erebētā Satsujin Jiken" (Japanese: エレベーター殺人事件)	Masato Sato	Kazunari Kochi	June 10, 1996	June 24, 2004
20	21	21	"The Haunted Mansion Murder" / "The Disappearing Act"; Transliteration: "Yūreiyashiki Satsujin Jiken" (Japanese: 幽霊屋敷殺人事件)	Ikuro Sato	N/A	June 17, 1996	June 28, 2004
21	22	22	"The TV Drama Murder Case" / "Lights, Camera... Murder"; Transliteration: "TV Dorama Roke Satsujin Jiken" (Japanese: TVドラマロケ殺人事件)	Hirohito Ochi	Hirohito Ochi	June 24, 1996	June 29, 2004
22	23	23	"The Luxury Liner Murders (Part 1)" / "Smooth Sailing (Part 1)"; Transliteration: "Gōka Kyakusen Renzoku Satsujin Jiken (Zenpen)" (Japanese: 豪華客船連続殺人事件（前編）)	Ko Matsuzono	N/A	July 1, 1996	June 30, 2004
23	24	24	"The Luxury Liner Murders (Part 2)" / "Smooth Sailing (Part 2)"; Transliteration: "Gōka Kyakusen Renzoku Satsujin Jiken (Kōhen)" (Japanese: 豪華客船連続殺人事件（後編）)	Toshiya Shinohara	N/A	July 8, 1996	July 1, 2004
24	25	25	"The Case of the Mysterious Woman with Amnesia" / "Better Off Forgotten"; Transliteration: "Nazo no Bijo Kioku Sōshitsu Jiken" (Japanese: 謎の美女記憶喪失事件)	Johei Matsura	Junichi Miyashita	July 15, 1996	July 5, 2004
25	26	26	"The Fake Ransom Case" / "The Counterfeit Ransom Kidnapping"; Transliteration: "Itsuwari no Mino Shiro Kin Yūkai Jiken" (Japanese: 偽りの身代金誘拐事件)	Masato Sato	Yuichi Higurashi	July 22, 1996	July 6, 2004
26	27^{A}	27	"John the Dog's Murder Case" / "Jack Attacks!"; Transliteration: "Aiken Jon Satsujin Jiken" (Japanese: 愛犬ジョン殺人事件)	Hirohito Ochi	Kazunari Kochi	July 29, 1996	July 7, 2004
27	28^{A}	28	"Kogoro's Reunion Murder Case (Part 1)" / "Richard's Class Reunion (Part 1)"; Transliteration: "Kogoro no Dōsōkai Satsujin Jiken (Zenpen)" (Japanese: 小五郎の同窓会殺人事件（前編）)	Ko Matsuzono	Hiroshi Kashiwabara	August 5, 1996	July 8, 2004
28	29^{A}	29	"Kogoro's Reunion Murder Case (Part 2)" / "Richard's Class Reunion (Part 2)"; Transliteration: "Kogoro no Dōsōkai Satsujin Jiken (Kōhen)" (Japanese: 小五郎の同窓会殺人事件（後編）)	Kazuo Nogami	Hiroshi Kashiwabara	August 12, 1996	July 12, 2004

=== Season 2 (1996–97) ===
Orig.^{Jp.}	Funi.^{Eng.}	No. in season	Crunchyroll translated title/Funimation title Original Japanese title	Directed by	Written by	Original release date	English air date
29	30	1	"The Computer Murder Case"; Transliteration: "Konpyūtā Satsujin Jiken" (Japanese: コンピューター殺人事件)	Johei Matsura	Kazunari Kochi	August 19, 1996	July 13, 2004
30	31	2	"The Alibi Testimony Murder Case" / "The Missing Melody"; Transliteration: "Aribai Shōgen Satsujin Jiken" (Japanese: アリバイ証言殺人事件)	Masato Sato	Junichi Miyashita	August 26, 1996	July 14, 2004
31	32	3	"The TV Station Murder Case" / "Murder at the Television Studio"; Transliteration: "Terebi-kyoku Satsujin Jiken" (Japanese: テレビ局殺人事件)	Hirohito Ochi	N/A	September 2, 1996	July 15, 2004
32	33	4	"The Coffee Shop Murder Case" / "Murder at the Local Diner"; Transliteration: "Kōhī Shoppu Satsujin Jiken" (Japanese: コーヒーショップ殺人事件)	Kazuo Nogami	N/A	September 9, 1996	July 19, 2004
33	34	5	"The Detective League Survival Case" / "A Hunting We Will Go"; Transliteration: "Tantei-dan Sabaibaru Jiken" (Japanese: 探偵団サバイバル事件)	Ko Matsuzono	Ryoko Nabewari	October 14, 1996	July 20, 2004
34	35	6	"The Mountain Lodge Bandage Man Murder Case (Part 1)" / "Mountain Villa Murder (Part 1)"; Transliteration: "Sansō Hōtai Otoko Satsujin Jiken (Zenpen)" (Japanese: 山荘包帯男殺人事件（前編）)	Yasuichiro Yamamoto	N/A	October 21, 1996	July 21, 2004
35	36	7	"The Mountain Lodge Bandage Man Murder Case (Part 2)" / "Mountain Villa Murder (Part 2)"; Transliteration: "Sansō Hōtai Otoko Satsujin Jiken (Kōhen)" (Japanese: 山荘包帯男殺人事件（後編）)	Masato Sato	N/A	October 28, 1996	July 22, 2004
36	37	8	"The Monday, 7:30 P.M. Murder Case" / "Wrong Place at the Wrong Time"; Transliteration: "Getsuyō Yoru Shichiji Sanjūpun Satsujin Jiken" (Japanese: 月曜夜7時30分殺人事件)	Johei Matsura	Kazunari Kochi	November 4, 1996	July 26, 2004
37	38	9	"The Cactus Flower Murder Case" / "Prickly Past"; Transliteration: "Saboten no Hana Satsujin Jiken" (Japanese: サボテンの花殺人事件)	Susumu Ishizaki	Kazunari Kochi	November 11, 1996	July 27, 2004
38	39	10	"The Akaoni Fire Festival Murder Case" / "Flames of Confusion"; Transliteration: "Akaoni Mura Himatsuri Sastujin Jiken" (Japanese: 赤鬼村火祭殺人事件)	Hirohito Ochi	N/A	November 18, 1996	July 28, 2004
39	40	11	"The Wealthy Daughter Murder Case (Part 1)" / "Billionaire Birthday Blues (Part 1)"; Transliteration: "Shisanka Reijō Satsujin Jiken (Zenpen)" (Japanese: 資産家令嬢殺人事件（前編）)	Izumi Shimura	N/A	November 25, 1996	July 29, 2004
40	41	12	"The Wealthy Daughter Murder Case (Part 2)" / "Billionaire Birthday Blues (Part 2)"; Transliteration: "Shisanka Reijō Satsujin Jiken (Kōhen)" (Japanese: 資産家令嬢殺人事件（後編）)	Yasuichiro Yamamoto	N/A	December 2, 1996	August 2, 2004
41	42	13	"The Shredded Championship Flag Case" / "Left in Tatters"; Transliteration: "Yūshōki Kirisaki Jiken" (Japanese: 優勝旗切り裂き事件)	Johei Matsura	Junichi Miyashita	December 9, 1996	August 3, 2004
42	43	14	"The Karaoke Box Murder Case" / "Karaoke Killing"; Transliteration: "Karaoke Bokkusu Satsujin Jiken" (Japanese: カラオケボックス殺人事件)	Masato Sato	Toshiki Inoue	December 16, 1996	August 4, 2004
43	44	15	"The Conan Edogawa Abduction Case" / "Conan Is Kidnapped"; Transliteration: "Edogawa Konan Yūkai Jiken" (Japanese: 江戸川コナン誘拐事件)	Susumu Ishizaki	N/A	January 13, 1997	August 5, 2004
44	45	16	"The Three Hotta Siblings Murder Case" / "Unhappy Birthday"; Transliteration: "Hotta Sankyōdai Satsujin Jiken" (Japanese: 堀田三兄弟殺人事件)	Hirohito Ochi	Yuichi Higurashi	January 20, 1997	August 9, 2004
45	46	17	"The Face Pack Murder Case" / "Unexpected Visitors"; Transliteration: "Kaopakku Satsujin Jiken" (Japanese: 顔パック殺人事件)	Yasuichiro Yamamoto	Yuichi Higurashi	January 27, 1997	August 10, 2004
46	47	18	"The Snowy Mountain Lodge Murder Case" / "A Game of Murder"; Transliteration: "Yukiyama Sansō Satsujin Jiken" (Japanese: 雪山山荘殺人事件)	Johei Matsuura	N/A	February 3, 1997	August 11, 2004
47	48	19	"The Sports Club Murder Case" / "The Last Dive"; Transliteration: "Supōtsu Kurabu Satsujin Jiken" (Japanese: スポーツクラブ殺人事件)	Susumu Ishizaki	Junichi Miyashita	February 10, 1997	—
48	49	20	"The Diplomat Murder Case (Part 1)" / "No Immunity for the Diplomat (Part 1)"; Transliteration: "Gaikōkan Satsujin Jiken (Zenpen)" (Japanese: 外交官殺人事件（前編）)	Kazuo Nogami	N/A	February 17, 1997	August 12, 2004
49	50	21	"The Diplomat Murder Case (Part 2)" / "No Immunity for the Diplomat (Part 2)"; Transliteration: "Gaikōkan Satsujin Jiken (Kōhen)" (Japanese: 外交官殺人事件（後編）)	Susumu Ishizaki	N/A	February 24, 1997	August 16, 2004
50	51	22	"The Library Murder Case" / "The Book Without Pages"; Transliteration: "Toshokan Satsujin Jiken" (Japanese: 図書館殺人事件)	Hirohito Ochi	N/A	March 3, 1997	—
51	52	23	"The Golf Range Murder Case" / "Driving a Bomb"; Transliteration: "Gorufu Renshuujō Satsujin Jiken" (Japanese: ゴルフ練習場殺人事件)	Johei Matsuura	Kazunari Kochi	March 10, 1997	—
52	53^{B}	24	"The Legendary Kiri Tengu Murders^{1 hr.}" / "The Mist Goblin Murder (Part 1)"; Transliteration: "Kiri-tengu Densetsu Satsujin Jiken" (Japanese: 霧天狗伝説殺人事件)	Kazuo Nogami Yasuichiro Yamamoto	Kazunari Kochi	March 17, 1997	—
52	54^{B}	25	"The Legendary Kiri Tengu Murders^{1 hr.}" / "The Mist Goblin Murder (Part 2)"; Transliteration: "Kiri-tengu Densetsu Satsujin Jiken" (Japanese: 霧天狗伝説殺人事件)	Kazuo Nogami Yasuichiro Yamamoto	Kazunari Kochi	March 17, 1997	—
53	55^{B}	26	"The Mystery Weapon Murder" / "Weapon of Choice"; Transliteration: "Nazo no Kyouki Satsujin Jiken" (Japanese: 謎の凶器殺人事件)	Hirohito Ochi	Kazunari Kochi	April 7, 1997	—
54	56^{B}	27	"The Game Company Murder Case" / "Game Gone Bad"; Transliteration: "Gēmu Kaisha Satsujin Jiken" (Japanese: ゲーム会社殺人事件)	Kazuo Nogami	N/A	April 14, 1997	—

=== Season 3 (1998) ===
Orig.^{Jp.}	Funi.^{Eng.}	No. in season	Crunchyroll translated title/Funimation title Original Japanese title	Directed by	Written by	Original release date
55	57	1	"The Train Trick Murder Case" / "Train Trick"; Transliteration: "Ressha Torikku Satsujin Jiken" (Japanese: 列車トリック殺人事件)	Susumu Ishizaki	Junichi Miyashita	April 21, 1997
56	58	2	"The Ojamanbo Murder Case" / "The Sunfish Murder"; Transliteration: "Ojamanbō Satsujin Jiken" (Japanese: おじゃマンボウ殺人事件)	Yasuhiro Matsumura	Kazunari Kochi	April 28, 1997
57	59	3	"The Holmes Freak Murder Case (Part 1)" / "Footsteps of the Hero (Part 1)"; Transliteration: "Hōmuzu Furīku Satsujin Jiken (Zenpen)" (Japanese: ホームズフリーク殺人事件（前編）)	Yasuichiro Yamamoto	N/A	May 5, 1997
58	60	4	"The Holmes Freak Murder Case (Part 2)" / "Footsteps of the Hero (Part 2)"; Transliteration: "Hōmuzu Furīku Satsuji Jiken (Kōhen)" (Japanese: ホームズフリーク殺人事件（後編）)	Yasuichiro Yamamoto	N/A	May 12, 1997
59	61	5	"The First Errand Murder" / "Shopping Can Be Murder"; Transliteration: "Hajimete no Otsukai Satsujin Jiken" (Japanese: 初めてのお使い殺人事件)	Johei Matsura	Junichi Miyashita	May 19, 1997
60	62	6	"The Illustrator Murder Case" / "Illustrated Murder"; Transliteration: "Irasutorētā Satsujin Jiken" (Japanese: イラストレーター殺人事件)	Masashi Abe	N/A	May 26, 1997
61	63	7	"The Ghost Ship Murder Case (Part 1)" / "Ghost Ship Murder (Part 1)"; Transliteration: "Yūreisen Satsujin Jiken (Zenpen)" (Japanese: 幽霊船殺人事件（前編）)	Susumu Ishizaki	Yuichi Higurashi	June 2, 1997
62	64	8	"The Ghost Ship Murder Case (Part 2)" / "Ghost Ship Murder (Part 2)"; Transliteration: "Yūreisen Satsujin Jiken (Kōhen)" (Japanese: 幽霊船殺人事件（後編）)	Yasuichiro Yamamoto	Yuichi Higurashi	June 9, 1997
63	65	9	"The Giant Monster Gomera Murder Case" / "Gomera!"; Transliteration: "Ōkaijū Gomera Satsujin Jiken" (Japanese: 大怪獣ゴメラ殺人事件)	Kazuo Nogami	N/A	June 16, 1997
64	66	10	"The 3rd Set of Fingerprints Murder Case" / "The Three Fingerprints"; Transliteration: "Daisan no Shimon Satsujin Jiken" (Japanese: 第3の指紋殺人事件)	Johei Matsura	Kazunari Kochi	June 23, 1997
65	67	11	"The Crabs and Whale Kidnapping Case" / "The Crab and Whale"; Transliteration: "Kani to Kujira Yūkai Jiken" (Japanese: カニとクジラ誘拐事件)	Masashi Abe	Kazunari Kochi	June 30, 1997
66	68	12	"The Pitch Dark Road Murder Case" / "Moonless Murder"; Transliteration: "Kurayami no Michi Satsujin Jiken" (Japanese: 暗闇の道殺人事件)	Kazuo Nogami	Yutaka Yamada	July 7, 1997
67	69	13	"The Stage Actress Murder Case" / "The Case of the Murdered Actress"; Transliteration: "Butai Joyū Satsujin Jiken" (Japanese: 舞台女優殺人事件)	Kazuo Nogami	Yuichi Higurashi	July 14, 1997
68	70	14	"The Night Baron Murder Case (The Murder)" / "Knight Baron Mystery (Part 1)"; Transliteration: "Naito Baron Satsujin Jiken (Jikenhen)" (Japanese: 闇の男爵殺人事件 （事件篇）)	Yasuichiro Yamamoto	N/A	July 21, 1997
69	71	15	"The Night Baron Murder Case (The Suspicion)" / "Knight Baron Mystery (Part 2)"; Transliteration: "Naito Baron Satsujin Jiken (Giwaku Hen)" (Japanese: 闇の男爵殺人事件（疑惑篇）)	Masato Sato	N/A	July 28, 1997
70	72	16	"The Night Baron Murder Case (The Solution)" / "Knight Baron Mystery (Part 3)"; Transliteration: "Naito Baron Satsujin Jiken (Kaiketsu Hen)" (Japanese: 闇の男爵殺人事件（解決篇）)	Yoshio Suzuki	N/A	August 4, 1997
71	73	17	"The Stalker Murder Case" / "The Stalker"; Transliteration: "Sutōkā Satsujin Jiken" (Japanese: ストーカー殺人事件)	Johei Matsura	Kazunari Kochi	August 11, 1997
72	74	18	"The Triplets Villa Murder Case" / "Triple Terror"; Transliteration: "Mitsugo Bessō Satsujin Jiken" (Japanese: 三つ子別荘殺人事件)	Kazuo Nogami	N/A	August 18, 1997
73	75	19	"The Junior Detective League Shipwreck Case" / "The Ship Wreck Murder"; Transliteration: "Shōnentantei-dan Sōnan Jiken" (Japanese: 少年探偵団遭難事件)	Yoshio Suzuki	Junichi Miyashita	August 25, 1997
74	76	20	"The Shinigami Jinnai Murder Case" / "Jinnai, King of Death"; Transliteration: "Shinigami Jinnai Satsujin Jiken" (Japanese: 死神陣内殺人事件)	Yasuichiro Yamamoto	Masahiro Yokotani	September 1, 1997
75	77	21	"The Finance Company President Murder Case" / "Murder and Mahjong"; Transliteration: "Kinyū Kaisha Shachō Satsujin Jiken" (Japanese: 金融会社社長殺人事件)	Johei Matsura	N/A	September 8, 1997
76	78	22	"Conan vs. Kaitou Kid^{1 hr.}" / "Phantom Thief 1412 (Part 1)"; Transliteration: "Conan VS Kaitō Kiddo" (Japanese: コナンVS怪盗キッド)	Kazuo Nogami	N/A	September 15, 1997
76	79	23	"Conan vs. Kaitou Kid^{1 hr.}" / "Phantom Thief 1412 (Part 2)"; Transliteration: "Conan VS Kaitō Kiddo" (Japanese: コナンVS怪盗キッド)	Kazuo Nogami	N/A	September 15, 1997
77	80^{C}	24	"The Case of the Eminent Family's Strange Deaths (Part 1)" / "Mysterious Masked Murder (Part 1)"; Transliteration: "Meika Renzoku Henshi Jiken (Zenpen)" (Japanese: 名家連続変死事件（前編）)	Masato Sato	N/A	September 22, 1997
78	81^{C}	25	"The Case of the Eminent Family's Strange Deaths (Part 2)" / "Mysterious Masked Murder (Part 2)"; Transliteration: "Meika Renzoku Henshi Jiken (Kōhen)" (Japanese: 名家連続変死事件（後編）)	Yasuichiro Yamamoto	N/A	September 29, 1997
79	82^{C}	26	"The Bank Robbery Murder Case" / "The Revengeful Robber"; Transliteration: "Ginkō Gōtō Satsujin Jiken" (Japanese: 銀行強盗殺人事件)	Johei Matsuura	Kazunari Kochi	October 6, 1997
80	83^{C}	27	"The Hobo Artist Murder Case" / "Dead Hobo"; Transliteration: "Hōrō Gaka Satsujin Jiken" (Japanese: 放浪画家殺人事件)	Nana Harada	Junichi Miyashita	October 13, 1997
81	84^{C}	28	"The Popular Artists Abduction Case (Part 1)" / "Two Times Trouble (Part 1)"; Transliteration: "Ninki Ātisuto Yūkai Jiken (Zenpen)" (Japanese: 人気アーティスト誘拐事件（前編）)	Yasuichiro Yamamoto	N/A	November 20, 1997
82	85^{C}	29	"The Popular Artists Abduction Case (Part 2)" / "Two Times Trouble (Part 2)"; Transliteration: "Ninki Ātisuto Yūkai Jiken (Kōhen)" (Japanese: 人気アーティスト誘拐事件（後編）)	Yasuichiro Yamamoto	N/A	November 27, 1997

=== Season 4 (1997–98) ===
Orig.^{Jp.}	Funi.^{Eng.}	No. in season	Crunchyroll translated title/Funimation title Original Japanese title	Directed by	Written by	Original release date
83	86	1	"The General Hospital Murder Case" / "The Set Up"; Transliteration: "Sōgōbyōin Satsujin Jiken" (Japanese: 総合病院殺人事件)	Johei Matsura	Junichi Miyashita	December 1, 1997
84	87	2	"The Ski Lodge Murder Case (Part 1)" / "Massacre Night (Part 1)"; Transliteration: "Sukii Rojji Satsujin Jiken (Zenpen)" (Japanese: スキーロッジ殺人事件（前編）)	Kazuo Nogami	N/A	December 8, 1997
85	88	3	"The Ski Lodge Murder Case (Part 2)" / "Massacre Night (Part 2)"; Transliteration: "Sukii Rojji Satsujin Jiken (Kōhen)" (Japanese: スキーロッジ殺人事件（後編）)	Kazuo Nogami	N/A	December 15, 1997
86	89	4	"The Kidnap Locating Case" / "Find the Kidnap Site"; Transliteration: "Yūkai Genba Tokutei Jiken" (Japanese: 誘拐現場特定事件)	Yoshio Suzuki	Shunsuke Ozawa	January 12, 1998
87	90	5	"The Crane That Returned a Favor Murder Case" / "For the Birds"; Transliteration: "Tsuru no Ongaeshi Satsujin Jiken" (Japanese: 鶴の恩返し殺人事件)	Yasuichiro Yamamoto	Takeo Ohno	January 19, 1998
88	91	6	"The Dracula Manor Murder Case (Part 1)" / "Vampire Villa (Part 1)"; Transliteration: "Dorakyura-sō Satsujin Jiken (Zenpen)" (Japanese: ドラキュラ荘殺人事件（前編）)	Hirohito Ochi	Hirohito Ochi	January 26, 1998
89	92	7	"The Dracula Manor Murder Case (Part 2)" / "Vampire Villa (Part 2)"; Transliteration: "Dorakyura-sō Satsujin Jiken (Kōhen)" (Japanese: ドラキュラ荘殺人事件（後編）)	Hirohito Ochi	Hirohito Ochi	February 2, 1998
90	93	8	"The Flower Scent Murder Case" / "Deadly Art"; Transliteration: "Hana no Kaori Satsujin Jiken" (Japanese: 花の香り殺人事件)	Johei Matsura	Yuichi Higurashi	February 9, 1998
91	94	9	"The Robber Hospitalization Case" / "Hospital Homicide"; Transliteration: "Gōtō Hannin Nyuuin Jiken" (Japanese: 強盗犯人入院事件)	Yasuichiro Yamamoto	Shunsuke Ozawa	February 16, 1998
92	95	10	"The Traverse of Terror Murder Case (Part 1)" / "Mountain Fox (Part 1)"; Transliteration: "Kyōfu no Toravaasu Satsujin Jiken (Zenpen)" (Japanese: 恐怖のトラヴァース殺人事件（前編）)	Kazuo Nogami	Junichi Miyashita	February 23, 1998
93	96	11	"The Traverse of Terror Murder Case (Part 2)" / "Mountain Fox (Part 2)"; Transliteration: "Kyōfu no Toravaasu Satsujin Jiken (Kōhen)" (Japanese: 恐怖のトラヴァース殺人事件（後編）)	Yoshio Suzuki	Junichi Miyashita	March 2, 1998
94	97	12	"The Snow Woman Legend Murder Case" / "The Other Girl"; Transliteration: "Yuki-onna Densetsu Satsujin Jiken" (Japanese: 雪女伝説殺人事件)	Johei Matsura	Takeo Ohno	March 9, 1998
95	98	13	"Kogoro's Date Murder Case" / "Richard's Deadly Date"; Transliteration: "Kogorō no Deeto Satsujin Jiken" (Japanese: 小五郎のデート殺人事件)	Hirohito Ochi	Kazunari Kochi	March 16, 1998
96	99	14	"The Great Detective is Cornered! Two Big Murder Cases in a Row^{2 hrs.}" / "Jimmy Kudo Revealed (Part 1)"; Transliteration: "Oitsumerareta Meitantei! Renzoku Nidai Satsujin Jiken" (Japanese: 追いつめられた名探偵!連続2大殺人事件)	Yasuichiro Yamamoto Keitaro Motonaga	N/A	March 23, 1998
96	100	15	"The Great Detective is Cornered! Two Big Murder Cases in a Row^{2 hrs.}" / "Jimmy Kudo Revealed (Part 2)"; Transliteration: "Oitsumerareta Meitantei! Renzoku Nidai Satsujin Jiken" (Japanese: 追いつめられた名探偵!連続2大殺人事件)	Yasuichiro Yamamoto Keitaro Motonaga	N/A	March 23, 1998
96	101	16	"The Great Detective is Cornered! Two Big Murder Cases in a Row^{2 hrs.}" / "Jimmy Kudo Revealed (Part 3)"; Transliteration: "Oitsumerareta Meitantei! Renzoku Nidai Satsujin Jiken" (Japanese: 追いつめられた名探偵!連続2大殺人事件)	Yasuichiro Yamamoto Keitaro Motonaga	N/A	March 23, 1998
96	102	17	"The Great Detective is Cornered! Two Big Murder Cases in a Row^{2 hrs.}" / "Jimmy Kudo Revealed (Part 4)"; Transliteration: "Oitsumerareta Meitantei! Renzoku Nidai Satsujin Jiken" (Japanese: 追いつめられた名探偵!連続2大殺人事件)	Yasuichiro Yamamoto Keitaro Motonaga	N/A	March 23, 1998
97	103	18	"The Farewell Wine Murder Case"; Transliteration: "Wakare no Wain Satsujin Jiken" (Japanese: 別れのワイン殺人事件)	Yasuichiro Yamamoto	Yuichi Higurashi	April 13, 1998
98	104	19	"The Famous Potter Murder Case (Part 1)" / "Potter's Gambit (Part 1)"; Transliteration: "Meitōgeika Satsujin Jiken (Zenpen)" (Japanese: 名陶芸家殺人事件（前編）)	Kazuo Nogami	Kazunari Kochi	April 20, 1998
99	105	20	"The Famous Potter Murder Case (Part 2)" / "Potter's Gambit (Part 2)"; Transliteration: "Meitōgeika Satsujin Jiken (Kōhen)" (Japanese: 名陶芸家殺人事件（後編）)	Yoshio Suzuki	Kazunari Kochi	April 27, 1998
100	106^{D}	21	"The Memories of First Love Case (Part 1)" / "The Memories of First Love (Part 1)"; Transliteration: "Hatsukoi no Hito Omoide no Jiken (Zenpen)" (Japanese: 初恋の人想い出事件（前編）)	Hirohito Ochi	N/A	May 11, 1998
101	107^{D}	22	"The Memories of First Love Case (Part 2)" / "The Memories of First Love (Part 2)"; Transliteration: "Hatsukoi no Hito Omoide no Jiken (Kōhen)" (Japanese: 初恋の人想い出事件（後編）)	Yasuichiro Yamamoto	N/A	May 18, 1998
102	108^{D}	23	"The Historical Drama Actor Murder Case (Part 1)" / "Fame and Misfortune (Part 1)"; Transliteration: "Jidaigeki Haiyū Satsujin Jiken (Zenpen)" (Japanese: 時代劇俳優殺人事件（前編）)	Johei Matsura	N/A	May 25, 1998
103	109^{D}	24	"The Historical Drama Actor Murder Case (Part 2)" / "Fame and Misfortune (Part 2)"; Transliteration: "Jidaigeki Haiyū Satsujin Jiken (Kōhen)" (Japanese: 時代劇俳優殺人事件（後編）)	Kazuo Nogami	N/A	June 1, 1998
104	110^{D}	25	"The Case of the Mysterious Bandit Mansion (Part 1)" / "The Mystery of Bludcraven Manor (Part 1)"; Transliteration: "Tōzoku-dan Nazo no Yōkan Jiken (Zenpen)" (Japanese: 盗賊団謎の洋館事件（前編）)	Nana Harada	N/A	June 8, 1998
105	111^{D}	26	"The Case of the Mysterious Bandit Mansion (Part 2)" / "The Mystery of Bludcraven Manor (Part 2)"; Transliteration: "Tōzoku-dan Nazo no Yōkan Jiken (Kōhen)" (Japanese: 盗賊団謎の洋館事件（後編）)	Hirohito Ochi	N/A	June 15, 1998
106	112^{D}	27	"The Scoop Photograph Murder Case" / "Snapshots of Death"; Transliteration: "Sukūpu Shashin Satsujin Jiken" (Japanese: スクープ写真殺人事件)	Johei Matsura	Junichi Miyashita	June 22, 1998

=== Season 5 (1998–99) ===
Orig.^{Jp.}	Funi.^{Eng.}	No. in season	Crunchyroll translated title/Funimation title Original Japanese title	Directed by	Written by	Original release date
107	113	1	"The Mystery of the Mole Alien (Part 1)" / "The Mystery Moletian Case (Part 1)"; Transliteration: "Mogura Seijin Nazo no Jiken (Zenpen)" (Japanese: モグラ星人謎の事件（前編）)	Yasuichiro Yamamoto	Kazunari Kochi	June 29, 1998
108	114	2	"The Mystery of the Mole Alien (Part 2)" / "The Mystery Moletian Case (Part 2)"; Transliteration: "Mogura Seijin Nazo no Jiken (Kōhen)" (Japanese: モグラ星人謎の事件（後編）)	Kazuo Nogami	Kazunari Kochi	July 6, 1998
109	115	3	"The Great Detective League Pursuit Case" / "Hit and Run"; Transliteration: "Tantei-dan Daitsuiseki Jiken" (Japanese: 探偵団大追跡事件)	Hirohito Ochi	Junichi Miyashita	July 13, 1998
110	116	4	"The Cooking Classroom Murder Case (Part 1)" / "Recipe for Murder (Part 1)"; Transliteration: "Ryōri Kyōshitsu Satsujin Jiken (Zenpen)" (Japanese: 料理教室殺人事件（前編）)	Nana Harada	Kazunari Kochi	July 27, 1998
111	117	5	"The Cooking Classroom Murder Case (Part 2)" / "Recipe for Murder (Part 2)"; Transliteration: "Ryōri Kyōshitsu Satsujin Jiken (Kōhen)" (Japanese: 料理教室殺人事件（後編）)	Yasuichiro Yamamoto	Kazunari Kochi	August 3, 1998
112	118	6	"The Seven Mysteries of Teitan Elementary" / "School of Ghouls"; Transliteration: "Teitan-shō Nana-Fushigi Jiken" (Japanese: 帝丹小7不思議事件)	Johei Matsura	N/A	August 10, 1998
113	119	7	"The White Sandy Beach Murder Case" / "Prescription for Murder"; Transliteration: "Shiroi Sunahama Satsujin Jiken" (Japanese: 白い砂浜殺人事件)	Kazuo Nogami	Yutaka Yamada	August 17, 1998
114	120	8	"The Scuba Diving Murder Case (Part 1)" / "Scuba Dying (Part 1)"; Transliteration: "Sukyūba Daibingu Satsujin Jiken (Zenpen)" (Japanese: スキューバダイビング殺人事件（前編）)	Hirohito Ochi	Junichi Miyashita	August 24, 1998
115	121	9	"The Scuba Diving Murder Case (Part 2)" / "Scuba Dying (Part 2)"; Transliteration: "Sukyūba Daibingu Satsujin Jiken (Kōhen)" (Japanese: スキューバダイビング殺人事件（後編）)	Nana Harada	Junichi Miyashita	August 31, 1998
116	122	10	"The Mystery Writer Disappearance Case (Part 1)" / "The Mystery Writer Disappearance (Part 1)"; Transliteration: "Misuterii Sakka Shissō Jiken (Zenpen)" (Japanese: ミステリー作家失踪事件（前編）)	Johei Matsura	N/A	September 7, 1998
117	123	11	"The Mystery Writer Disappearance Case (Part 2)" / "The Mystery Writer Disappearance (Part 2)"; Transliteration: "Misuterii Sakka Shissō Jiken (Kōhen)" (Japanese: ミステリー作家失踪事件（後編）)	Kazuo Nogami	N/A	September 14, 1998
118	124	12	"The Naniwa Serial Murder Case^{1 hr.}" / "License to Die (Part 1)"; Transliteration: "Naniwa no Renzoku Satsujin Jiken" (Japanese: 浪花の連続殺人事件)	Yasuichiro Yamamoto	N/A	September 21, 1998
118	125	12	"The Naniwa Serial Murder Case^{1 hr.}" / "License to Die (Part 2)"; Transliteration: "Naniwa no Renzoku Satsujin Jiken" (Japanese: 浪花の連続殺人事件)	Yasuichiro Yamamoto	N/A	September 21, 1998
119	126	13	"The Kamen Yaiba Murder Case" / "The Masked Yaiba Murder Mystery"; Transliteration: "Kamen Yaibaa Satsujin Jiken" (Japanese: 仮面ヤイバー殺人事件)	Hirohito Ochi	Kazunari Kochi	October 12, 1998
120	127	14	"The Honey Cocktail Murder Case" / "The Big Sting"; Transliteration: "Hanii Kakuteru Satsujin Jiken" (Japanese: ハニーカクテル殺人事件)	Johei Matsura	Masaki Sakurai	October 19, 1998
121	128	15	"The Sealed Bathroom Murder Case (Part 1)" / "The Forgotten Bond (Part 1)"; Transliteration: "Basurūmu Misshitsu Jiken (Zenpen)" (Japanese: バスルーム密室事件（前編）)	Nana Harada	N/A	October 26, 1998
122	129	16	"The Sealed Bathroom Murder Case (Part 2)" / "The Forgotten Bond (Part 2)"; Transliteration: "Basurūmu Misshitsu Jiken (Kōhen)" (Japanese: バスルーム密室事件（後編）)	Yoshio Suzuki	N/A	November 2, 1998
123	130	17	"The Weather Lady Abduction Case" / "The Disappearing Weather Girl"; Transliteration: "Otenki Oneesan Yūkai Jiken" (Japanese: お天気お姉さん誘拐事件)	Minoru Tozawa	Manabu Harada	November 9, 1998
124	–	18	"A Mysterious Sniper Murder Case (Part 1)"; Transliteration: "Nazo no Sogekimono Satsujin Jiken (Zenpen)" (Japanese: 謎の狙撃者殺人事件（前編）)	Nana Harada	Hiroshi Kashiwabara	November 16, 1998
125	–	19	"A Mysterious Sniper Murder Case (Part 2)"; Transliteration: "Nazo no Sogekimono Satsujin Jiken (Kōhen)" (Japanese: 謎の狙撃者殺人事件（後編）)	Hirohito Ochi	Hiroshi Kashiwabara	November 23, 1998
126	–	20	"The Traveling Drama Troupe Murder Case (Part 1)"; Transliteration: "Tabi Shibai Ichiza Satsujin Jiken (Zenpen)" (Japanese: 旅芝居一座殺人事件（前編）)	Johei Matsura	Junichi Miyashita	November 30, 1998
127	–	21	"The Traveling Drama Troupe Murder Case (Part 2)"; Transliteration: "Tabi Shibai Ichiza Satsujin Jiken (Kōhen)" (Japanese: 旅芝居一座殺人事件（後編）)	Yoshio Suzuki	Junichi Miyashita	December 7, 1998
128	–	22	"The Black Organization: One Billion Yen Robbery Case"; Transliteration: "Kuro no Soshiki Jūoku En Gōdatsu Jiken" (Japanese: 黒の組織10億円強奪事件)	Minoru Tozawa	Junichi Miyashita	December 14, 1998
129	–	23	"The Girl from the Black Organization and the University Professor Murder Case^{2 hrs.}" Transliteration: "Kuro no Soshiki Kara Kita Onna Daigaku Kyōju Satsujin Jiken" (Japanese: 黒の組織から来た女 大学教授殺人事件)	Keitaro Motonaga Toshiya Shinohara	N/A	January 4, 1999
130	–	24	"The Indiscriminate Threatening Stadium Case (Part 1)"; Transliteration: "Kyōgijō Musabetsu Kyōhaku Jiken (Zenpen)" (Japanese: 競技場無差別脅迫事件（前編）)	Hirohito Ochi	N/A	January 11, 1999
131	–	25	"The Indiscriminate Threatening Stadium Case (Part 2)"; Transliteration: "Kyōgijō Musabetsu Kyōhaku Jiken (Kōhen)" (Japanese: 競技場無差別脅迫事件（後編）)	Nana Harada	N/A	January 18, 1999
132	–	26	"Magic Lover's Murder Case (The Murder)"; Transliteration: "Kijutsu Aikōka Satsujin Jiken (Jikenhen)" (Japanese: 奇術愛好家殺人事件（事件篇）)	Johei Matsura	N/A	January 25, 1999
133	–	27	"Magic Lover's Murder Case (The Suspicion)"; Transliteration: "Kijutsu Aikōka Satsujin Jiken (Giwakuhen)" (Japanese: 奇術愛好家殺人事件（疑惑篇）)	Yoshio Suzuki	N/A	February 1, 1999
134	–	28	"Magic Lover's Murder Case (The Resolution)"; Transliteration: "Kijutsu Aikōka Satsujin Jiken (Kaiketsuhen)" (Japanese: 奇術愛好家殺人事件（解決篇）)	Nana Harada	N/A	February 8, 1999

=== Season 6 (1999) ===
No. overall	No. in season	Title	Directed by	Written by	Original release date
135	1	"The Disappearing Weapon Case"; Transliteration: "Kieta Kyōki Sousaku Jiken" (Japanese: 消えた凶器捜索事件)	Minoru Tozawa	Kazunari Kochi	February 15, 1999
136	2	"The Old Blue Castle Investigation Case (Part 1)"; Transliteration: "Ao no Kojō Tansaku Jiken (Zenpen)" (Japanese: 青の古城探索事件（前編）)	Yoshio Suzuki	N/A	February 22, 1999
137	3	"The Old Blue Castle Investigation Case (Part 2)"; Transliteration: "Ao no Kojō Tansaku Jiken (Kōhen)" (Japanese: 青の古城探索事件（後編）)	Hirohito Ochi	N/A	March 1, 1999
138	4	"The Final Screening Murder Case (Part 1)"; Transliteration: "Saigo no Jouei Satsujin Jiken (Zenpen)" (Japanese: 最後の上映殺人事件（前編）)	Koichi Sasaki	N/A	March 8, 1999
139	5	"The Final Screening Murder Case (Part 2)"; Transliteration: "Saigo no Jouei Satsujin Jiken (Kōhen)" (Japanese: 最後の上映殺人事件（後編）)	Nana Harada	N/A	March 15, 1999
140	6	"SOS! Message from Ayumi"; Transliteration: "SOS! Ayumi Kara no Messeiji" (Japanese: SOS!歩美からのメッセージ)	Minoru Tozawa	Kazunari Kochi	April 12, 1999
141	7	"The Night Before the Wedding Locked Room Case (Part 1)"; Transliteration: "Kekkon Zenya no Misshitsu Jiken (Zenpen)" (Japanese: 結婚前夜の密室事件（前編）)	Yoshio Suzuki	N/A	April 19, 1999
142	8	"The Night Before the Wedding Locked Room Case (Part 2)"; Transliteration: "Kekkon Zenya no Misshitsu Jiken (Kōhen)" (Japanese: 結婚前夜の密室事件（後編）)	Hirohito Ochi	N/A	April 26, 1999
143	9	"The Suspicious Astronomical Observation"; Transliteration: "Giwaku no Tentaikansoku" (Japanese: 疑惑の天体観測)	Koichi Sasaki	Manabu Harada	May 3, 1999
144	10	"The North Star No. 3 Express Leaving Ueno (Part 1)"; Transliteration: "Ueno-hatsu Hokutosei Sango (Zenpen)" (Japanese: 上野発北斗星3号（前編）)	Nana Harada	N/A	May 10, 1999
145	11	"The North Star No. 3 Express Leaving Ueno (Part 2)"; Transliteration: "Ueno-hatsu Hokutosei Sango (Kōhen)" (Japanese: 上野発北斗星3号（後編）)	Minoru Tozawa	N/A	May 17, 1999
146	12	"Metropolitan Police Detective Love Story (Part 1)"; Transliteration: "Honchō no Keiji Koi Monogatari (Zenpen)" (Japanese: 本庁の刑事恋物語（前編）)	Yoshio Suzuki	N/A	May 24, 1999
147	13	"Metropolitan Police Detective Love Story (Part 2)"; Transliteration: "Honchō no Keiji Koi Monogatari (Kōhen)" (Japanese: 本庁の刑事恋物語（後編）)	Nana Harada	N/A	May 31, 1999
148	14	"The Sudden Street Car Stopping Case"; Transliteration: "Rōmen Densha Kyūteishi Jiken" (Japanese: 路面電車急停止事件)	Kazuo Nogami	Masaki Sakurai	June 7, 1999
149	15	"The Amusement Park Bungee Jumping Case"; Transliteration: "Yūenchi Banjii Jiken" (Japanese: 遊園地パンジー事件)	Koichi Sasaki	Hiroshi Kashiwabara Hiro Chikatoki	June 21, 1999
150	16	"The Truth of the Exploding Car Case (Part 1)"; Transliteration: "Jidōsha Bakuhatsu Jiken no Shinsō (Zenpen)" (Japanese: 自動車爆発事件の真相（前編）)	Hirohito Ochi	Kazunari Kochi	June 28, 1999
151	17	"The Truth of the Exploding Car Case (Part 2)"; Transliteration: "Jidōsha Bakuhatsu Jiken no Shinsō (Kōhen)" (Japanese: 自動車爆発事件の真相（後編）)	Minoru Tozawa	Kazunari Kochi Hiro Chikatoki	July 5, 1999
152	18	"The Mysterious Old Man Disappearance Case"; Transliteration: "Nazo no Rōjin Shissō Jiken" (Japanese: 謎の老人失踪事件)	Yoshio Suzuki	Junichi Miyashita	July 12, 1999
153	19	"Sonoko's Dangerous Summer Story (Part 1)"; Transliteration: "Sonoko no Abunai Natsumonogatari (Zenpen)" (Japanese: 園子のアブない夏物語（前編）)	Nana Harada	N/A	July 19, 1999
154	20	"Sonoko's Dangerous Summer Story (Part 2)"; Transliteration: "Sonoko no Abunai Natsumonogatari (Kōhen)" (Japanese: 園子のアブない夏物語（後編）)	Kazuo Nogami	N/A	July 26, 1999
155	21	"The Underwater Locked Room Case"; Transliteration: "Suichū no Kagi Misshitsu Jiken" (Japanese: 水中の鍵密室事件)	Koichi Sasaki	Kazunari Kochi	August 2, 1999
156	22	"Metropolitan Police Detective Love Story 2 (Part 1)"; Transliteration: "Honchō no Keiji Koi Monogatari 2 (Zenpen)" (Japanese: 本庁の刑事恋物語2（前編）)	Minoru Tozawa	N/A	August 9, 1999
157	23	"Metropolitan Police Detective Love Story 2 (Part 2)"; Transliteration: "Honchō no Keiji Koi Monogatari 2 (Kōhen)" (Japanese: 本庁の刑事恋物語2（後編）)	Hirohito Ochi	N/A	August 16, 1999
158	24	"The Silent Loop Line"; Transliteration: "Chinmoku no Kanjosen" (Japanese: 沈黙の環状線)	Nana Harada	Takeshi Mochizuki	August 23, 1999
159	25	"The Bizarre Legend of the Five Storied Pagoda (Part 1)"; Transliteration: "Kaiki Gojūnotō Densetsu (Zenpen)" (Japanese: 怪奇五重塔伝説（前編）)	Kazuo Nogami	Kenji Saito	September 6, 1999
160	26	"The Bizarre Legend of the Five Storied Pagoda (Part 2)"; Transliteration: "Kaiki Gojūnotō Densetsu (Kōhen)" (Japanese: 怪奇五重塔伝説（後編）)	Koichi Sasaki	Kenji Saito	September 13, 1999
161	27	"The Murder Floating in the Water Stream Restaurant"; Transliteration: "Ryūsuitei ni Nagareru Satsui" (Japanese: 流水亭に流れる殺意)	Minoru Tozawa	Takao Isami	September 20, 1999
162	28	"The Case of the Flying Locked Room, Shin'ichi Kudou's First Case^{1 hr.}" / "The Sealed Chamber in the Sky: Shinichi Kudo's First Case"; Transliteration: "Sora Tobu Misshitsu Kudō Shinichi Saisho no Jiken" (Japanese: 空飛ぶ密室 工藤新一最初の事件)	Masato Sato	N/A	September 27, 1999

=== Season 7 (1999–2000) ===
No. overall	No. in season	Title	Directed by	Written by	Original release date
163	1	"The Secret of the Moon, the Star, and the Sun (Part 1)"; Transliteration: "Tsuki to Hoshi to Taiyō no Himitsu (Zenpen)" (Japanese: 月と星と太陽の秘密（前編）)	Nana Harada	N/A	October 11, 1999
164	2	"The Secret of the Moon, the Star, and the Sun (Part 2)"; Transliteration: "Tsuki to Hoshi to Taiyō no Himitsu (Kōhen)" (Japanese: 月と星と太陽の秘密（後編）)	Hirohito Ochi	N/A	October 18, 1999
165	3	"The Disappearing Detective Boys Case"; Transliteration: "Shōnen Tantei-dan Shōshitsu Jiken" (Japanese: 少年探偵団消失事件)	Masato Sato	Junichi Miyashita	October 25, 1999
166	4	"Tottori Spider Mansion Demon (The Murder)"; Transliteration: "Tottori Kumo-yashiki no Kai (Jikenhen)" (Japanese: 鳥取クモ屋敷の怪（事件編）)	Kazuo Nogami	N/A	November 1, 1999
167	5	"Tottori Spider Mansion Demon (The Suspicion)"; Transliteration: "Tottori Kumo-yashiki no Kai (Giwakuhen)" (Japanese: 鳥取クモ屋敷の怪（疑惑編）)	Yoshio Suzuki	N/A	November 8, 1999
168	6	"Tottori Spider Mansion Demon (The Resolution)"; Transliteration: "Tottori Kumo-yashiki no Kai (Kaiketsuhen)" (Japanese: 鳥取クモ屋敷の怪（解決編）)	Minoru Tozawa	N/A	November 15, 1999
169	7	"Venus' Kiss"; Transliteration: "Biinasu no Kissu" (Japanese: ビーナスのキッス)	Nana Harada	Takeshi Mochizuki	November 22, 1999
170	8	"Blind Spot in the Darkness (Part 1)"; Transliteration: "Kurayami no Naka no Shikaku (Zenpen)" (Japanese: 暗闇の中の死角（前編）)	Hirohito Ochi	N/A	November 29, 1999
171	9	"Blind Spot in the Darkness (Part 2)"; Transliteration: "Kurayami no Naka no Shikaku (Kōhen)" (Japanese: 暗闇の中の死角（後編）)	Kazuo Nogami	N/A	December 6, 1999
172	10	"The Revival of the Dying Message (Part 1)"; Transliteration: "Yomigaeru Shi no Dengon (Zenpen)" (Japanese: よみがえる死の伝言（前編）)	Masato Sato	N/A	December 13, 1999
173	11	"The Revival of the Dying Message (Part 2)"; Transliteration: "Yomigaeru Shi no Dengon (Kōhen)" (Japanese: よみがえる死の伝言（後編）)	Hideki Hiroshima	N/A	December 20, 1999
174	12	"The 20 Year Old Murder Case: The Symphony Serial Murders^{2 hrs.}" Transliteration: "Nijuunenme no Satsui Shinfoniigou Renzoku Satsujin Jiken" (Japanese: 20年目の殺意 シンフォニー号連続殺人事件)	Hajime Kamegaki	N/A	January 3, 2000
175	13	"The Man Who Was Killed Four Times"; Transliteration: "Yonkai Korosareta Otoko" (Japanese: 四回殺された男)	Minoru Tozawa	Nobuo Ogizawa	January 10, 2000
176	14	"Re-encounter with the Black Organization (Haibara's Part)"; Transliteration: "Kuro no Soshiki to no Saikai (Haibara-hen)" (Japanese: 黒の組織との再会（灰原編）)	Hirohito Ochi	N/A	January 17, 2000
177	15	"Re-encounter with the Black Organization (Conan's Part)"; Transliteration: "Kuro no Soshiki to no Saikai (Conan-hen)" (Japanese: 黒の組織との再会（コナン編）)	Kazuo Nogami	N/A	January 24, 2000
178	16	"Re-encounter with the Black Organization (The Resolution)"; Transliteration: "Kuro no Soshiki to no Saikai (Kaiketsuhen)" (Japanese: 黒の組織との再会（解決編）)	Nana Harada	N/A	January 31, 2000
179	17	"The Coffee Shop Truck's Wild Entrance Case"; Transliteration: "Kissaten Torakku Rannyuu Jiken" (Japanese: 喫茶店トラック乱入事件)	Hiroshi Kurimoto	Satoshi Kitagawa	February 7, 2000
180	18	"The Nocturne of Red Murderous Intent (Part 1)"; Transliteration: "Akai Satsui no Nocturne (Zenpen)" (Japanese: 赤い殺意の夜想曲（前編）)	Kazuo Nogami	Chiaki Hashiba	February 14, 2000
181	19	"The Nocturne of Red Murderous Intent (Part 2)"; Transliteration: "Akai Satsui no Nocturne (Kōhen)" (Japanese: 赤い殺意の夜想曲（後編）)	Minoru Tozawa	Chiaki Hashiba	February 21, 2000
182	20	"The Big Investigation of the Nine Doors"; Transliteration: "Daisousaku no Kokonotsu no Doa" (Japanese: 大捜索9つのドア)	Nana Harada	Kazunari Kochi	February 28, 2000
183	21	"A Dangerous Recipe"; Transliteration: "Kiken na Reshipi" (Japanese: 危険なレシピ)	Hiroshi Kurimoto	Kazunari Kochi	March 6, 2000
184	22	"A Cursed Mask Coldly Laughs^{1 hr.}" Transliteration: "Noroi no Kamen wa Tsumetaku Warau" (Japanese: 呪いの仮面は冷たく笑う)	Hirohito Ochi	Hirohito Ochi	March 13, 2000
185	23	"The Murdered Famous Detective (Part 1)"; Transliteration: "Korosareta Meitantei (Zenpen)" (Japanese: 殺された名探偵（前編）)	Mashu Ito	Chiaki Hashiba	April 10, 2000
186	24	"The Murdered Famous Detective (Part 2)"; Transliteration: "Korosareta Meitantei (Kōhen)" (Japanese: 殺された名探偵（後編）)	Kazuo Nogami	Chiaki Hashiba	April 17, 2000
187	25	"The Mysterious Gun Rings in the Dark"; Transliteration: "Yami ni Hibiku Nazo no Juusei" (Japanese: 闇に響く謎の銃声)	Minoru Tozawa	Manabu Harada	April 24, 2000
188	26	"Risking Life for Revival: The Detective Boys in a Cave" / "The Desperate Revival – The Cavern of the Detective Boys"; Transliteration: "Inochigake no Fukkatsu ~Doukutsu no Tantei-dan~" (Japanese: 命がけの復活〜洞窟の探偵団〜)	Hiroshi Kurimoto	N/A	May 1, 2000
189	27	"Risking Life for Revival: The Wounded Great Detective" / "The Desperate Revival – The Wounded Great Detective"; Transliteration: "Inochigake no Fukkatsu ~Fushoushita Meitantei~" (Japanese: 命がけの復活〜負傷した名探偵〜)	Nana Harada	N/A	May 8, 2000
190	28	"Risking Life for Revival: The Third Choice" / "The Desperate Revival – The Third Choice"; Transliteration: "Inochigake no Fukkatsu ~Daisan no Sentaku~" (Japanese: 命がけの復活〜第三の選択〜)	Kazuo Nogami	N/A	May 15, 2000
191	29	"Risking Life for Revival: The Knight in Black" / "The Desperate Revival – The Black Knight"; Transliteration: "Inochigake no Fukkatsu ~Kokui no Kishi~" (Japanese: 命がけの復活〜黒衣の騎士〜)	Kazuo Nogami	N/A	May 22, 2000
192	30	"Risking Life for Revival: Shinichi Returns..." / "The Desperate Revival – Shinichi's Return..."; Transliteration: "Inochigake no Fukkatsu ~Kaette kita Shinichi...~" (Japanese: 命がけの復活〜帰ってきた新一...〜)	Nana Harada	N/A	May 29, 2000
193	31	"Risking Life for Revival: The Promised Place" / "The Desperate Revival – The Promised Place"; Transliteration: "Inochigake no Fukkatsu ~Yakusoku no Basho~" (Japanese: 命がけの復活〜約束の場所〜)	Minoru Tozawa	N/A	June 5, 2000

=== Season 8 (2000–01) ===
No. overall	No. in season	Title	Directed by	Written by	Original release date
194	1	"The Significant Music Box (Part 1)"; Transliteration: "Imishin na Orugooru (Zenpen)" (Japanese: 意味深なオルゴール（前編）)	Hiroshi Kurimoto	N/A	June 12, 2000
195	2	"The Significant Music Box (Part 2)"; Transliteration: "Imishin na Orugooru (Kōhen)" (Japanese: 意味深なオルゴール（後編）)	Nana Harada	N/A	June 19, 2000
196	3	"The Invisible Weapon: Ran's First Investigation"; Transliteration: "Mienai Kyouki Ran no Hatsu-suiri" (Japanese: 見えない凶器 蘭の初推理)	Masato Sato	Kazunari Kochi	June 26, 2000
197	4	"The Super Car's Trap (Part 1)"; Transliteration: "Suupaa Kaa no Wana (Zenpen)" (Japanese: スーパーカーの罠（前編）)	Kazuo Nogami	Toshiyuki Tabe	July 3, 2000
198	5	"The Super Car's Trap (Part 2)"; Transliteration: "Suupaa Kaa no Wana (Kōhen)" (Japanese: スーパーカーの罠（後編）)	Mashu Ito	Toshiyuki Tabe	July 10, 2000
199	6	"Kogoro Mouri, Suspect (Part 1)"; Transliteration: "Yougisha – Mōri Kogoro (Zenpen)" (Japanese: 容疑者·毛利小五郎（前編）)	Eiichi Kuboyama	N/A	July 17, 2000
200	7	"Kogoro Mouri, Suspect (Part 2)"; Transliteration: "Yougisha – Mōri Kogoro (Kōhen)" (Japanese: 容疑者·毛利小五郎（後編）)	Minoru Tozawa	N/A	July 24, 2000
201	8	"The Tenth Passenger (Part 1)"; Transliteration: "Juuninme no Joukyaku (Zenpen)" (Japanese: 10人目の乗客（前編）)	Hiroshi Kurimoto	Junichi Miyashita	July 31, 2000
202	9	"The Tenth Passenger (Part 2)"; Transliteration: "Juuninme no Joukyaku (Kōhen)" (Japanese: 10人目の乗客（後編）)	Nana Harada	Junichi Miyashita	August 7, 2000
203	10	"The Black Wing of Icarus (Part 1)"; Transliteration: "Kuroi Ikarosu no Tsubasa (Zenpen)" (Japanese: 黒いイカロスの翼（前編）)	Hirohito Ochi	Chika Hashiba	August 14, 2000
204	11	"The Black Wing of Icarus (Part 2)"; Transliteration: "Kuroi Ikarosu no Tsubasa (Kōhen)" (Japanese: 黒いイカロスの翼（後編）)	Kazuo Nogami	Chika Hashiba	August 21, 2000
205	12	"Metropolitan Police Detective Love Story 3 (Part 1)"; Transliteration: "Honchou no Keiji Koi Monogatari 3 (Zenpen)" (Japanese: 本庁の刑事恋物語3（前編）)	Mashu Ito	N/A	August 28, 2000
206	13	"Metropolitan Police Detective Love Story 3 (Part 2)"; Transliteration: "Honchou no Keiji Koi Monogatari 3 (Kōhen)" (Japanese: 本庁の刑事恋物語3（後編）)	Minoru Tozawa	N/A	September 4, 2000
207	14	"The Deduction That Was Too Good"; Transliteration: "Migoto-sugita Meisuiri" (Japanese: 見事すぎた名推理)	Hiroshi Kurimoto	Nobuo Ogizawa	September 11, 2000
208	15	"The Entrance to the Maze: The Anger of Colossus^{1 hr.}" Transliteration: "Meikyuu he no Iriguchi Kyodai Jinzou no Ikari" (Japanese: 迷宮への入り口 巨大神像の怒り)	Hirohito Ochi Satoshi Kuwabara	Chika Hashiba	October 9, 2000
209	16	"The Falling from Mt. Ryushin Case"; Transliteration: "Ryuushin-san Tenraku Jiken" (Japanese: 龍神山転落事件)	Eiichi Kuboyama	Satoshi Kitagawa	October 16, 2000
210	17	"The Water Palace of 5 Colors (Part 1)"; Transliteration: "Gozai Densetsu no Mizu-gotten (Zenpen)" (Japanese: 五彩伝説の水御殿（前編）)	Nana Harada	Takeshi Mochizuki	October 23, 2000
211	18	"The Water Palace of 5 Colors (Part 2)"; Transliteration: "Gozai Densetsu no Mizu-gotten (Kōhen)" (Japanese: 五彩伝説の水御殿（後編）)	Kazuo Nogami	Takeshi Mochizuki	October 30, 2000
212	19	"Mushrooms, Bears, and the Detective Boys (Part 1)"; Transliteration: "Kinoko to Kuma to Tantei-dan (Zenpen)" (Japanese: きのこと熊と探偵団（前編）)	Minoru Tozawa	N/A	November 6, 2000
213	20	"Mushrooms, Bears, and the Detective Boys (Part 2)"; Transliteration: "Kinoko to Kuma to Tantei-dan (Kōhen)" (Japanese: きのこと熊と探偵団（後編）)	Mashu Ito	N/A	November 13, 2000
214	21	"The Mysterious Retro Room Case"; Transliteration: "Retoro Ruumu no Nazo Jiken" (Japanese: レトロルームの謎事件)	Eiichi Kuboyama	Takeshi Mochizuki	November 20, 2000
215	22	"The Bay of Revenge (Part 1)"; Transliteration: "Bei Obu Ribenji (Zenpen)" (Japanese: ベイ·オブ·リベンジ （前編）)	Hiroshi Kurimoto	Toyoto Kogiso	November 27, 2000
216	23	"The Bay of Revenge (Part 2)"; Transliteration: "Bei Obu Ribenji (Kōhen)" (Japanese: ベイ·オブ·リベンジ （後編）)	Kazuo Nogami	Toyoto Kogiso	December 4, 2000
217	24	"Megure's Sealed Secret (Part 1)"; Transliteration: "Fuuin-sareta Megure no Himitsu (Zenpen)" (Japanese: 封印された目暮の秘密（前編）)	Minoru Tozawa	N/A	December 11, 2000
218	25	"Megure's Sealed Secret (Part 2)"; Transliteration: "Fuuin-sareta Megure no Himitsu (Kōhen)" (Japanese: 封印された目暮の秘密（後編）)	Kazuo Nogami	N/A	December 18, 2000
219	26	"The Detectives Gathered Together! Shinichi Kudo vs. Kid the Phantom Thief^{2 hrs.}" / "The Gathering of the Detectives! Shinichi Kudo vs. Kaito Kid"; Transliteration: "Atsumerareta Meitantei! Kudō Shinichi VS Kaitō Kiddo" (Japanese: 集められた名探偵!工藤新一VS怪盗キッド)	Masato Sato	N/A	January 8, 2001

=== Season 9 (2001) ===
No. overall	No. in season	Title	Directed by	Written by	Original release date
220	1	"The Client Full of Lies (Part 1)"; Transliteration: "Itsuwari Darake no Irainin (Zenpen)" (Japanese: 偽りだらけの依頼人（前編）)	Hiroshi Kurimoto	N/A	January 15, 2001
221	2	"The Client Full of Lies (Part 2)"; Transliteration: "Itsuwari Darake no Irainin (Kōhen)" (Japanese: 偽りだらけの依頼人（後編）)	Mashu Ito	N/A	January 22, 2001
222	3	"And There Were No Mermaids (The Case)"; Transliteration: "Soshite Ningyou wa Inakunatta (Jikenhen)" (Japanese: そして人魚はいなくなった（事件編）)	Eiichi Kuboyama	N/A	January 29, 2001
223	4	"And There Were No Mermaids (The Deduction)"; Transliteration: "Soshite Ningyou wa Inakunatta (Suirihen)" (Japanese: そして人魚はいなくなった（推理編）)	Kazuo Nogami	N/A	February 5, 2001
224	5	"And There Were No Mermaids (The Resolution)"; Transliteration: "Soshite Ningyou wa Inakunatta (Kaiketsuhen)" (Japanese: そして人魚はいなくなった（解決編）)	Minoru Tozawa	N/A	February 12, 2001
225	6	"The Secret of the High Sales"; Transliteration: "Shoubai Hanjou no Himitsu" (Japanese: 商売繁盛のヒミツ)	Hiroshi Kurimoto	Nobuo Ogizawa	February 19, 2001
226	7	"Battle Game Trap (Part 1)"; Transliteration: "Batoru Geemu no Wana (Zenpen)" (Japanese: バトルゲームの罠（前編）)	Masato Sato	N/A	February 26, 2001
227	8	"Battle Game Trap (Part 2)"; Transliteration: "Batoru Geemu no Wana (Kōhen)" (Japanese: バトルゲームの罠（後編）)	Eiichi Kuboyama	N/A	March 5, 2001
228	9	"The Murderous Pottery Class (Part 1)"; Transliteration: "Satsui no Dougei Kyoushitsu (Zenpen)" (Japanese: 殺意の陶芸教室（前編）)	Mashu Ito	N/A	March 12, 2001
229	10	"The Murderous Pottery Class (Part 2)"; Transliteration: "Satsui no Dougei Kyoushitsu (Kōhen)" (Japanese: 殺意の陶芸教室（後編）)	Kazuo Nogami	N/A	March 19, 2001
230	11	"Mysterious Passenger (Part 1)"; Transliteration: "Nazo-meita Joukyaku (Zenpen)" (Japanese: 謎めいた乗客（前編）)	Minoru Tozawa	N/A	April 16, 2001
231	12	"Mysterious Passenger (Part 2)"; Transliteration: "Nazo-meita Joukyaku (Kōhen)" (Japanese: 謎めいた乗客（後編）)	Masato Sato	N/A	April 23, 2001
232	13	"The Falling from the Apartment Case"; Transliteration: "Manshon Tenraku Jiken" (Japanese: マンション転落事件)	Kazuo Nogami	Satoshi Kitagawa	May 7, 2001
233	14	"The Evidence That Didn't Disappear (Part 1)"; Transliteration: "Kienakatta Shouko (Zenpen)" (Japanese: 消えなかった証拠（前編）)	Hiroshi Kurimoto	N/A	May 14, 2001
234	15	"The Evidence That Didn't Disappear (Part 2)"; Transliteration: "Kienakatta Shouko (Kōhen)" (Japanese: 消えなかった証拠（後編）)	Mashu Ito	N/A	May 21, 2001
235	16	"The Locked Wine Cellar"; Transliteration: "Misshitsu no Wain Seraa" (Japanese: 密室のワインセラー)	Eiichi Kuboyama	Kenji Saito	May 28, 2001
236	17	"The Nanki Shirahama Mystery Tour (Part 1)"; Transliteration: "Nanki Shirahama Misuterii Tsuaa (Zenpen)" (Japanese: 南紀白浜ミステリーツアー（前編）)	Minoru Tozawa	Kazunari Kochi	June 4, 2001
237	18	"The Nanki Shirahama Mystery Tour (Part 2)"; Transliteration: "Nanki Shirahama Misuterii Tsuaa (Kōhen)" (Japanese: 南紀白浜ミステリーツアー（後編）)	Hiroshi Kurimoto	Kazunari Kochi	June 11, 2001
238	19	"The 3 "K"s of Osaka Case (Part 1)"; Transliteration: "Oosaka "Mittsu no K" Jiken (Zenpen)" (Japanese: 大阪"3つのK"事件（前編）)	Kazuo Nogami	N/A	June 18, 2001
239	20	"The 3 "K"s of Osaka Case (Part 2)"; Transliteration: "Oosaka "Mittsu no K" Jiken (Kōhen)" (Japanese: 大阪"3つのK"事件（後編）)	Yasuichiro Yamamoto	N/A	June 25, 2001
240	21	"The Bullet Train Transport Case (Part 1)"; Transliteration: "Shinkansen Gosou Jiken (Zenpen)" (Japanese: 新幹線護送事件（前編）)	Masato Sato Kazuhiko Ishii	N/A	July 2, 2001
241	22	"The Bullet Train Transport Case (Part 2)"; Transliteration: "Shinkansen Gosou Jiken (Kōhen)" (Japanese: 新幹線護送事件（後編）)	Masato Sato Kazuhiko Ishii	N/A	July 9, 2001
242	23	"Boy Genta's Misfortune"; Transliteration: "Genta Shōnen no Sainan" (Japanese: 元太少年の災難)	Minoru Tozawa	N/A	July 16, 2001
243	24	"Kogoro Mouri's Imposter (Part 1)"; Transliteration: "Mōri Kogoro no Nisemono (Zenpen)" (Japanese: 毛利小五郎のニセ者（前編）)	Hiroshi Kurimoto	N/A	July 23, 2001
244	25	"Kogoro Mouri's Imposter (Part 2)"; Transliteration: "Mōri Kogoro no Nisemono (Kōhen)" (Japanese: 毛利小五郎のニセ者（後編）)	Mashu Ito	N/A	July 30, 2001
245	26	"The Gunshot at the Sunflower Estate"; Transliteration: "Himawari-kan no Juusei" (Japanese: ヒマワリ館の銃声)	Kazuo Nogami	Sozo Tonami	August 6, 2001
246	27	"The Mystery in the Net (Part 1)"; Transliteration: "Ami ni Kakatta Nazo (Zenpen)" (Japanese: 網にかかった謎（前編）)	Nana Harada	N/A	August 13, 2001
247	28	"The Mystery in the Net (Part 2)"; Transliteration: "Ami ni Kakatta Nazo (Kōhen)" (Japanese: 網にかかった謎（後編）)	Minoru Tozawa	N/A	August 20, 2001
248	29	"The Alibi of the Soothing Forest"; Transliteration: "Iyashi no Mori no Aribai" (Japanese: 癒しの森のアリバイ)	Hiroshi Kurimoto	Yasue Sasano	August 27, 2001
249	30	"The Idols' Secret (Part 1)"; Transliteration: "Aidoru-tachi no Himitsu (Zenpen)" (Japanese: アイドル達の秘密（前編）)	Mashu Ito	N/A	September 3, 2001
250	31	"The Idols' Secret (Part 2)"; Transliteration: "Aidoru-tachi no Himitsu (Kōhen)" (Japanese: アイドル達の秘密（後編）)	Kazuo Nogami	N/A	September 10, 2001
251	32	"The Tragedy at the OK Corral"; Transliteration: "OK-Bokujou no Higeki" (Japanese: OK牧場の悲劇)	Mashu Ito	Hiro Masaki	September 17, 2001
252	33	"The Kidnapper in the Picture"; Transliteration: "E no Naka no Yuukaihan" (Japanese: 絵の中の誘拐犯)	Minoru Tozawa	Junichi Miyashita	October 8, 2001
253	34	"Metropolitan Police Detective Love Story 4 (Part 1)"; Transliteration: "Honchou no Keiji Koi Monogatari 4 (Zenpen)" (Japanese: 本庁の刑事恋物語4（前編）)	Hiroshi Kurimoto	N/A	October 15, 2001
254	35	"Metropolitan Police Detective Love Story 4 (Part 2)"; Transliteration: "Honchou no Keiji Koi Monogatari 4 (Kōhen)" (Japanese: 本庁の刑事恋物語4（後編）)	Kazuo Nogami	N/A	October 22, 2001

=== Season 10 (2001–02) ===
No. overall	No. in season	Title	Directed by	Written by	Original release date
255	1	"The 14th Round of the Matsue Tamatsukuri Linked Verse Contest (Part 1)"; Transliteration: "Matsue Tamatsukuri Renku Juuyonban Shoubu (Zenpen)" (Japanese: 松江玉造連句14番勝負（前編）)	Mashu Ito	Kazunari Kochi	October 29, 2001
256	2	"The 14th Round of the Matsue Tamatsukuri Linked Verse Contest (Part 2)"; Transliteration: "Matsue Tamatsukuri Renku Juuyonban Shoubu (Kōhen)" (Japanese: 松江玉造連句14番勝負（後編）)	Nana Harada	Kazunari Kochi	November 5, 2001
257	3	"The Extremely Strange Punishment from Heaven"; Transliteration: "Yo nimo Kimyou na Tenbatsu" (Japanese: 世にも奇妙な天罰)	Minoru Tozawa	Nobuo Ogizawa	November 12, 2001
258	4	"The Man from Chicago (Part 1)"; Transliteration: "Shikago Kara Kita Otoko (Zenpen)" (Japanese: シカゴから来た男（前編）)	Hideaki Oniwa	N/A	November 19, 2001
259	5	"The Man from Chicago (Part 2)"; Transliteration: "Shikago Kara Kita Otoko (Kōhen)" (Japanese: シカゴから来た男（後編）)	Kazuo Nogami	N/A	November 26, 2001
260	6	"The Shaking Restaurant"; Transliteration: "Yureru Resutoran" (Japanese: 揺れるレストラン)	Mashu Ito	Takeo Ohno	December 3, 2001
261	7	"The Fearful Legend of the Snowy Night (Part 1)"; Transliteration: "Yuki no Yoru no Kyoufu Densetsu (Zenpen)" (Japanese: 雪の夜の恐怖伝説（前編）)	Hideki Nagasaki	Chiaki Hashiba Fumiko Komatsuzaki	December 10, 2001
262	8	"The Fearful Legend of the Snowy Night (Part 2)"; Transliteration: "Yuki no Yoru no Kyoufu Densetsu (Kōhen)" (Japanese: 雪の夜の恐怖伝説（後編）)	Kazuo Nogami Mashu Ito	Chiaki Hashiba Fumiko Komatsuzaki	December 17, 2001
263	9	"The Osaka Double Mystery – Naniwa Swordsman and Toyotomi's Castle^{2 hrs.}" Transliteration: "Oosaka Daburu Misuterii: Naniwa Kenshi to Taikō no Shiro" (Japanese: 大阪ダブルミステリー 浪花剣士と太閤の城)	Akira Shimizu	N/A	January 7, 2002
264	10	"Courtroom Battle: Kisaki vs. Kogoro (Part 1)"; Transliteration: "Hōtei no Taiketsu: Kisaki tai Kogorō (Zenpen)" (Japanese: 法廷の対決 妃VS小五郎（前編）)	Yoshio Suzuki	Yutaka Kaneko	January 14, 2002
265	11	"Courtroom Battle: Kisaki vs. Kogoro (Part 2)"; Transliteration: "Houtei no Taiketsu: Kisaki tai Kogorou (Kōhen)" (Japanese: 法廷の対決 妃VS小五郎（後編）)	Mashu Ito	Yutaka Kaneko	January 21, 2002
266	12	"The Truth Behind Valentine's (The Case)"; Transliteration: "Barentain no Shinjitsu (Jikenhen)" (Japanese: バレンタインの真実（事件編）)	Hideaki Oniwa	N/A	January 28, 2002
267	13	"The Truth Behind Valentine's (The Reasoning)"; Transliteration: "Barentain no Shinjitsu (Suirihen)" (Japanese: バレンタインの真実（推理編）)	Toru Kitahata	N/A	February 4, 2002
268	14	"The Truth Behind Valentine's (The Resolution)"; Transliteration: "Barentain no Shinjitsu (Kaiketsuhen)" (Japanese: バレンタインの真実（解決編）)	Hideki Hiroshima	N/A	February 11, 2002
269	15	"The Forgotten Memento from the Crime (Part 1)"; Transliteration: "Hanzai no Wasuregatami (Zenpen)" (Japanese: 犯罪の忘れ形見（前編）)	Mashu Ito	N/A	February 18, 2002
270	16	"The Forgotten Memento from the Crime (Part 2)"; Transliteration: "Hanzai no Wasuregatami (Kōhen)" (Japanese: 犯罪の忘れ形見（後編）)	Izumi Shimura	N/A	March 4, 2002
271	17	"The Secret Rushed Omission (Part 1)"; Transliteration: "Kakushite Isoide Shouryaku (Zenpen)" (Japanese: 隠して急いで省略（前編）)	Johei Matsura	N/A	March 11, 2002
272	18	"The Secret Rushed Omission (Part 2)"; Transliteration: "Kakushite Isoide Shouryaku (Kōhen)" (Japanese: 隠して急いで省略（後編）)	Minoru Tozawa	N/A	March 18, 2002
273	19	"Old Lady's Quiz Disappearance Case"; Transliteration: "Kuizu-baasan no Shissou Jiken" (Japanese: クイズ婆さんの失踪事件)	Mashu Ito	Takeo Ohno	April 8, 2002
274	20	"The Truth About the Haunted House (Part 1)"; Transliteration: "Yuurei-yashiki no Shinjitsu (Zenpen)" (Japanese: 幽霊屋敷の真実（前編）)	Toru Kitahata	N/A	April 15, 2002
275	21	"The Truth About the Haunted House (Part 2)"; Transliteration: "Yuurei-yashiki no Shinjitsu (Kōhen)" (Japanese: 幽霊屋敷の真実（後編）)	Mashu Ito	N/A	April 22, 2002
276	22	"The Policeman's Missing Notebook Case"; Transliteration: "Keisatsu Techou Funshitsu Jiken" (Japanese: 警察手帳紛失事件)	Johei Matsura	Nobuo Ogizawa	May 6, 2002
277	23	"English Teacher vs. Great Detective of the West (Part 1)"; Transliteration: "Eigo-kyoushi tai Nishi no Meitantei (Zenpen)" (Japanese: 英語教師VS西の名探偵（前編）)	Minoru Tozawa	N/A	May 13, 2002
278	24	"English Teacher vs. Great Detective of the West (Part 2)"; Transliteration: "Eigo-kyoushi tai Nishi no Meitantei (Kōhen)" (Japanese: 英語教師VS西の名探偵（後編）)	Yoshio Suzuki	N/A	May 20, 2002
279	25	"Hooligan in the Labyrinth (Part 1)"; Transliteration: "Meikyuu no Fuurigan (Zenpen)" (Japanese: 迷宮のフーリガン（前編）)	Toru Kitahata	N/A	May 27, 2002
280	26	"Hooligan in the Labyrinth (Part 2)"; Transliteration: "Meikyuu no Fuurigan (Kōhen)" (Japanese: 迷宮のフーリガン（後編）)	Mashu Ito	N/A	June 3, 2002
281	27	"The Small Eye-Witnesses"; Transliteration: "Chiisana Mokugekisha-tachi" (Japanese: 小さな目撃者たち)	Johei Matsura	Michiru Shimada	June 10, 2002
282	28	"The Mystery of the Water Flowing Stone Garden (Part 1)"; Transliteration: "Mizu Nagaruru Sekitei no Kai (Zenpen)" (Japanese: 水流るる石庭の怪（前編）)	Minoru Tozawa	Yoshifumi Fukushima	June 17, 2002
283	29	"The Mystery of the Water Flowing Stone Garden (Part 2)"; Transliteration: "Mizu Nagaruru Sekitei no Kai (Kōhen)" (Japanese: 水流るる石庭の怪（後編）)	Shintaro Itoga	Yoshifumi Fukushima	June 24, 2002
284	30	"Chinatown Deja Vu in the Rain (Part 1)"; Transliteration: "Chuukagai Ame no Deja Byu (Zenpen)" (Japanese: 中華街 雨のデジャビュ（前編）)	Mashu Ito	N/A	July 1, 2002
285	31	"Chinatown Deja Vu in the Rain (Part 2)"; Transliteration: "Chuukagai Ame no Deja Byu (Kōhen)" (Japanese: 中華街 雨のデジャビュ（後編）)	Hideki Hiroshima	N/A	July 8, 2002

=== Season 11 (2002–03) ===
No.	No. in season	Title	Directed by	Written by	Original air date
286	1	"Shinichi Kudo in New York (The Case)"; Transliteration: "Kudō Shinichi NY no Jiken (Jikenhen)" (Japanese: 工藤新一NYの事件（事件編）)	Nana Harada	N/A	July 15, 2002
287	2	"Shinichi Kudo in New York (The Deduction)"; Transliteration: "Kudō Shinichi NY no Jiken (Suirihen)" (Japanese: 工藤新一NYの事件（推理編）)	Johei Matsuura	N/A	July 22, 2002
288	3	"Shinichi Kudo in New York (The Resolution)"; Transliteration: "Kudō Shinichi NY no Jiken (Kaiketsuhen)" (Japanese: 工藤新一NYの事件（解決編）)	Minoru Tozawa	N/A	July 29, 2002
289	4	"Mitsuhiko in a Forest of Indecision (Part 1)"; Transliteration: "Mayoi no Mori no Mitsuhiko (Zenpen)" (Japanese: 迷いの森の光彦（前編）)	Mashu Ito	N/A	August 5, 2002
290	5	"Mitsuhiko in a Forest of Indecision (Part 2)"; Transliteration: "Mayoi no Mori no Mitsuhiko (Kōhen)" (Japanese: 迷いの森の光彦（後編）)	Hideki Hiroshima	N/A	August 12, 2002
291	6	"Solitary Island of the Princess and the Dragon King's Palace (The Murder)"; Transliteration: "Kotō no Hime to Ryugujo (Jikenhen)" (Japanese: 孤島の姫と龍宮城（事件編）)	Shintaro Itoga	N/A	August 19, 2002
292	7	"Solitary Island of the Princess and the Dragon King's Palace (The Investigation)"; Transliteration: "Kotō no Hime to Ryugujo (Tsuikyūhen)" (Japanese: 孤島の姫と龍宮城（追求編）)	Mashu Ito	N/A	August 26, 2002
293	8	"Solitary Island of the Princess and the Dragon King's Palace (The Resolution)"; Transliteration: "Kotō no Hime to Ryugujo (Kaiketsuhen)" (Japanese: 孤島の姫と龍宮城（解決編）)	Johei Matsuura	N/A	September 2, 2002
294	9	"Smash of Love and Determination (Part 1)"; Transliteration: "Ai to Ketsudan no Sumasshu (Zenpen)" (Japanese: 愛と決断のスマッシュ（前編）)	Minoru Tozawa	Junichi Miyashita	September 9, 2002
295	10	"Smash of Love and Determination (Part 2)"; Transliteration: "Ai to Ketsudan no Sumasshu (Kōhen)" (Japanese: 愛と決断のスマッシュ（後編）)	Yoshio Suzuki	Junichi Miyashita	September 16, 2002
296	11	"Houseboat Fishing Shock"; Transliteration: "Yakatabune Tsuri Shokku" (Japanese: 屋形船 釣りショック)	Hideki Hiroshima	Masaaki Sakurai Masataka Tsukimawashi	October 14, 2002
297	12	"Courtroom Confrontation II: Kisaki vs. Kujo (Part 1)"; Transliteration: "Houtei no Taiketsu II: Kisaki tai Kujou (Zenpen)" (Japanese: 法廷の対決II 妃VS九条（前編）)	Shintaro Itoga	Yutaka Kaneko	October 21, 2002
298	13	"Courtroom Confrontation II: Kisaki vs. Kujo (Part 2)"; Transliteration: "Houtei no Taiketsu II: Kisaki tai Kujou (Kōhen)" (Japanese: 法廷の対決II 妃VS九条（後編）)	Mashu Ito	Yutaka Kaneko	October 28, 2002
299	14	"The Kanmon Strait of Friendship and Murderous Intent (Part 1)"; Transliteration: "Yuujou to Satsui no Kanmon Kaikyou (Zenpen)" (Japanese: 友情と殺意の関門海峡（前編）)	Johei Matsura	Nobuo Ogizawa	November 4, 2002
300	15	"The Kanmon Strait of Friendship and Murderous Intent (Part 2)"; Transliteration: "Yuujou to Satsui no Kanmon Kaikyou (Kōhen)" (Japanese: 友情と殺意の関門海峡（後編）)	Minoru Tozawa	Nobuo Ogizawa	November 18, 2002
301	16	"Parade of Malice and Saints (Part 1)"; Transliteration: "Akui to Seija no Koushin (Zenpen)" (Japanese: 悪意と聖者の行進（前編）)	Shintaro Itoga	N/A	November 25, 2002
302	17	"Parade of Malice and Saints (Part 2)"; Transliteration: "Akui to Seija no Koushin (Kōhen)" (Japanese: 悪意と聖者の行進（後編）)	Johei Matsura	N/A	December 2, 2002
303	18	"The Victim Who Came Back"; Transliteration: "Modotte Kita Higaisha" (Japanese: 戻って来た被害者)	Hideki Hiroshima	Nobuo Ogizawa Masataka Tsukimawashi	December 9, 2002
304	19	"Trembling Metropolitan Police Headquarters and 12 Million Hostages^{2 hrs.}" Transliteration: "Yureru Keishichou Sennihyakumannin no Hitojichi" (Japanese: 揺れる警視庁 1200万人の人質)	Masato Sato	N/A	January 6, 2003
305	20	"The Unseen Suspect (Part 1)"; Transliteration: "Mienai Yougisha (Zenpen)" (Japanese: 見えない容疑者（前編）)	Hideki Hiroshima	N/A	January 13, 2003
306	21	"The Unseen Suspect (Part 2)"; Transliteration: "Mienai Yougisha (Kōhen)" (Japanese: 見えない容疑者（後編）)	Yoshio Suzuki	N/A	January 20, 2003
307	22	"The Remains of a Voiceless Testimony (Part 1)"; Transliteration: "Nokosareta Koenaki Shōgen (Zenpen)" (Japanese: 残された声なき証言（前編）)	Yoshio Suzuki	N/A	January 27, 2003
308	23	"The Remains of a Voiceless Testimony (part 2)"; Transliteration: "Nokosareta Koenaki Shōgen (Kōhen)" (Japanese: 残された声なき証言（後編）)	Izumi Shimura	N/A	February 3, 2003
309	24	"Contact with the Black Organization: Negotiation Chapter"; Transliteration: "Kuro no Soshiki to no Sesshoku (Koushouhen)" (Japanese: 黒の組織との接触（交渉編）)	Johei Matsura	N/A	February 10, 2003
310	25	"Contact with the Black Organization: Pursuit Chapter"; Transliteration: "Kuro no Soshiki to no Sesshoku (Tsuisekihen)" (Japanese: 黒の組織との接触（追跡編）)	Hideki Hiroshima	N/A	February 17, 2003
311	26	"Contact with the Black Organization: Desperation Chapter"; Transliteration: "Kuro no Soshiki to no Sesshoku (Kesshihen)" (Japanese: 黒の組織との接触（決死編）)	Minoru Tozawa	N/A	February 24, 2003
312	27	"Festival Dolls Dyed in the Setting Sun (Part 1)"; Transliteration: "Yuuhi ni Somatta Hinaningyou (Zenpen)" (Japanese: 夕陽に染まった雛人形（前編）)	Yoshio Suzuki	N/A	March 3, 2003
313	28	"Festival Dolls Dyed in the Setting Sun (Part 2)"; Transliteration: "Yuuhi ni Somatta Hinaningyou (Kōhen)" (Japanese: 夕陽に染まった雛人形（後編）)	Yoshio Suzuki	N/A	March 10, 2003
314	29	"The Scenic Lookout with the Broken Fence"; Transliteration: "Kowareta Saku no Tenboudai" (Japanese: 壊れた柵の展望台)	Kazuyoshi Yokota	Hiro Masaki	March 17, 2003
315	30	"Place Exposed to the Sun"; Transliteration: "Hi no Ataru Basho" (Japanese: 陽のあたる場所)	Hideki Hiroshima	Takeo Ohno	April 14, 2003

=== Season 12 (2003–04) ===
No.	No. in season	Title	Directed by	Written by	Original air date
316	1	"The Sullied Masked Hero (Part 1)"; Transliteration: "Yogoreta Fukumen Hero (Zenpen)" (Japanese: 汚れた覆面ヒーロー（前編）)	Minoru Tozawa	N/A	April 21, 2003
317	2	"The Sullied Masked Hero (Part 2)"; Transliteration: "Yogoreta Fukumen Hero (Kouhen)" (Japanese: 汚れた覆面ヒーロー（後編）)	Yoshio Suzuki	N/A	April 28, 2003
318	3	"The Lucky Cigar Case (Part 1)"; Transliteration: "Kouun no Shigaa Keesu (Zenpen)" (Japanese: 幸運のシガーケース（前編）)	Nana Harada	Shunsuke Ozawa	May 5, 2003
319	4	"The Lucky Cigar Case (Part 2)"; Transliteration: "Kouun no Shigaa Keesu (Kouhen)" (Japanese: 幸運のシガーケース（後編）)	Kazuyoshi Yokota	Shunsuke Ozawa	May 12, 2003
320	5	"Ninja Art: The Art of Alibi Construction"; Transliteration: "Ninpou Aribai Kousaku no Jutsu" (Japanese: 忍法アリバイ工作の術)	Hideaki Oniwa	Nobuo Ogizawa	May 19, 2003
321	6	"The Kidnapper's Disappearing Getaway Car (Part 1)"; Transliteration: "Kieta Yuukai Tousousha (Zenpen)" (Japanese: 消えた誘拐逃走車（前編）)	Takeo Ohno	Hideki Hiroshima	May 26, 2003
322	7	"The Kidnapper's Disappearing Getaway Car (Part 2)"; Transliteration: "Kieta Yuukai Tousousha (Kouhen)" (Japanese: 消えた誘拐逃走車（後編）)	Minoru Tozawa	Takeo Ohno	June 2, 2003
323	8	"Heiji Hattori's Desperate Situation! (Part 1)"; Transliteration: "Hattori Heiji Zettai Zetsumei! (Zenpen)" (Japanese: 服部平次絶体絶命!（前編）)	Nana Harada	N/A	June 9, 2003
324	9	"Heiji Hattori's Desperate Situation! (Part 2)"; Transliteration: "Hattori Heiji Zettai Zetsumei! (Kouhen)" (Japanese: 服部平次絶体絶命!（後編）)	Kazuyoshi Yokota	N/A	June 16, 2003
325	10	"The Red Horse Within the Flames: The Case"; Transliteration: "Honoo no Naka ni Akai Uma (Jikenhen)" (Japanese: 炎の中に赤い馬（事件編）)	Hideaki Oba	N/A	June 23, 2003
326	11	"The Red Horse Within the Flames: The Investigation"; Transliteration: "Honoo no Naka ni Akai Uma (Sousahen)" (Japanese: 炎の中に赤い馬（捜査編）)	Nana Harada	N/A	June 30, 2003
327	12	"The Red Horse Within the Flames: The Resolution"; Transliteration: "Honoo no Naka ni Akai Uma (Kaiketsuhen)" (Japanese: 炎の中に赤い馬（解決編）)	Minoru Tozawa	N/A	July 7, 2003
328	13	"The Birthday Wine Mystery"; Transliteration: "Baasudee Wain no Nazo" (Japanese: バースデー·ワインの謎)	Hideaki Oba	Yutaka Yamada	July 14, 2003
329	14	"A Friendship That Can't Be Bought (Part 1)"; Transliteration: "Okane de Kaenai Yuujou (Zenpen)" (Japanese: お金で買えない友情（前編）)	Kazuyoshi Yokota	N/A	July 28, 2003
330	15	"A Friendship That Can't Be Bought (Part 2)"; Transliteration: "Okane de Kaenai Yuujou (Kouhen)" (Japanese: お金で買えない友情（後編）)	Minoru Tozawa	N/A	August 4, 2003
331	16	"The Suspicious Spicy Curry (Part 1)"; Transliteration: "Giwaku no Karakuchi Karee (Zenpen)" (Japanese: 疑惑の辛口カレー（前編）)	Katsuyoshi Yatabe	N/A	August 11, 2003
332	17	"The Suspicious Spicy Curry (Part 2)"; Transliteration: "Giwaku no Karakuchi Karee (Kouhen)" (Japanese: 疑惑の辛口カレー（後編）)	Hideaki Oba	N/A	August 18, 2003
333	18	"The Similar Princesses (Part 1)"; Transliteration: "Nitamono Purinsesu (Zenpen)" (Japanese: 似た者プリンセス（前編）)	Nana Harada	N/A	August 25, 2003
334	19	"The Similar Princesses (Part 2)"; Transliteration: "Nitamono Purinsesu (Kouhen)" (Japanese: 似た者プリンセス（後編）)	Kazuyoshi Yokota	N/A	September 1, 2003
335	20	"Secret of the Tohto Film Development Studio (Part 1)"; Transliteration: "Touto Genzoujo no Himitsu (Zenpen)" (Japanese: 東都現像所の秘密（前編）)	Minoru Tozawa	N/A	September 8, 2003
336	21	"Secret of the Tohto Film Development Studio (Part 2)"; Transliteration: "Touto Genzoujo no Himitsu (Kouhen)" (Japanese: 東都現像所の秘密（後編）)	Kazuhito Kikuchi	N/A	September 15, 2003
337	22	"Hidden Circumstances of the Falling Incident"; Transliteration: "Tenraku Jiken no Ura-jijou" (Japanese: 転落事件の裏事情)	Katsuyoshi Yatabe	Yoshifumi Fukushima	October 13, 2003
338	23	"The Four Porsches (Part 1)"; Transliteration: "Yon-dai no Porushe (Zenpen)" (Japanese: 4台のポルシェ（前編）)	Nana Harada	N/A	October 20, 2003
339	24	"The Four Porsches (Part 2)"; Transliteration: "Yon-dai no Porushe (Kouhen)" (Japanese: 4台のポルシェ（後編）)	Hideaki Oba	N/A	October 27, 2003
340	25	"The Secret Hidden in the Bathroom (Part 1)"; Transliteration: "Toire ni Kakushita Himitsu (Zenpen)" (Japanese: トイレに隠した秘密（前編）)	Minoru Tozawa	N/A	November 3, 2003
341	26	"The Secret Hidden in the Bathroom (Part 2)"; Transliteration: "Toire ni Kakushita Himitsu (Kouhen)" (Japanese: トイレに隠した秘密（後編）)	Katsuyoshi Yatabe	N/A	November 10, 2003
342	27	"The Bride of Huis Ten Bosch^{1 hr.}" Transliteration: "Hausutenbosu no Hanayome" (Japanese: ハウステンボスの花嫁)	Kazuyoshi Yokota	Toyoto Kogiso	November 17, 2003
343	28	"The Convenience Store Trap (Part 1)"; Transliteration: "Konbini no Otoshiana (Zenpen)" (Japanese: コンビニの落とし穴（前編）)	Hideaki Oba	N/A	December 1, 2003
344	29	"The Convenience Store Trap (Part 2)"; Transliteration: "Konbini no Otoshiana (Kouhen)" (Japanese: コンビニの落とし穴（後編）)	Masato Sato	N/A	December 8, 2003
345	30	"Confrontation with the Black Organization: Night of the Full Moon Mystery^{2.5 hrs.}" / "The Confrontation with the Black Organization: Night of the Full Moon Dual Mystery"; Transliteration: "Kuro no Soshiki to Makkou Shoubu Mangetsu no Yoru no Nigen Misuterii" (Japanese: 黒の組織と真っ向勝負満月の夜の二元ミステリー)	Minoru Tozawa Masato Sato	N/A	January 5, 2004
346	31	"Find the Buttocks' Mark (Part 1)"; Transliteration: "Oshiri no Maaku wo Sagase (Zenpen)" (Japanese: お尻のマークを探せ（前編）)	Katsuyoshi Yatabe	N/A	January 12, 2004
347	32	"Find the Buttocks' Mark (Part 2)"; Transliteration: "Oshiri no Maaku wo Sagase (Kōhen)" (Japanese: お尻のマークを探せ（後編）)	Nana Harada	N/A	January 19, 2004
348	33	"Love, Ghosts, and World Heritage (Part 1)"; Transliteration: "Ai to Yuurei to Chikyuu Isan (Zenpen)" (Japanese: 愛と幽霊と地球遺産（前編）)	Katsuyoshi Yatabe	Junichi Miyashita	January 26, 2004
349	34	"Love, Ghosts, and World Heritage (Part 2)"; Transliteration: "Ai to Yuurei to Chikyuu Isan (Kōhen)" (Japanese: 愛と幽霊と地球遺産（後編）)	Hideaki Oba	Junichi Miyashita	February 2, 2004
350	35	"The Forgotten Cell Phone (Part 1)"; Transliteration: "Wasureta Keitai Denwa (Zenpen)" (Japanese: 忘れた携帯電話（前編）)	Yukio Okazaki	N/A	February 9, 2004
351	36	"The Forgotten Cell Phone (Part 2)"; Transliteration: "Wasureta Keitai Denwa (Kōhen)" (Japanese: 忘れた携帯電話（後編）)	Shinji Takago	N/A	February 16, 2004
352	37	"The Tragedy of The Fishing Tournament (Part 1)"; Transliteration: "Fisshingu Taikai no Higeki (Zenpen)" (Japanese: フィッシング大会の悲劇（前編）)	Minoru Tozawa	Toyoto Kogiso	February 23, 2004
353	38	"The Tragedy of The Fishing Tournament (Part 2)"; Transliteration: "Fisshingu Taikai no Higeki (Kōhen)" (Japanese: フィッシング大会の悲劇（後編）)	Kazuyoshi Yokota	Toyoto Kogiso	March 1, 2004

=== Season 13 (2004–05) ===
No.	No. in season	Title	Directed by	Written by	Original air date
354	1	"A Small Client (Part 1)"; Transliteration: "Chiisana Iraisha (Zenpen)" (Japanese: 小さな依頼者（前編）)	Hideaki Oniwa	N/A	March 8, 2004
355	2	"A Small Client (Part 2)"; Transliteration: "Chiisana Iraisha (Kōhen)" (Japanese: 小さな依頼者（後編）)	Hideaki Oniwa	N/A	March 15, 2004
356	3	"Kaitou Kid's Miraculous Midair Walk^{1 hr.}" Transliteration: "Kaitō Kiddo no Kyoui Kuuchuu Hokō" (Japanese: 怪盗キッドの驚異空中歩行)	Hideaki Oniwa	N/A	April 12, 2004
357	4	"Sweetheart Is an Illusion of Spring"; Transliteration: "Koibito wa Haru no Maboroshi" (Japanese: 恋人は春のまぼろし)	Katsuyoshi Yatabe	Nobuo Ogizawa	April 26, 2004
358	5	"Metropolitan Police Detective Love Story 5 (Part 1)"; Transliteration: "Honchō no Keiji Koimonogatari 5 (Zenpen)" (Japanese: 本庁の刑事恋物語5（前編）)	Nana Harada	N/A	May 3, 2004
359	6	"Metropolitan Police Detective Love Story 5 (Part 2)"; Transliteration: "Honchō no Keiji Koimonogatari 5 (Kōhen)" (Japanese: 本庁の刑事恋物語5（後編）)	Nana Harada	N/A	May 10, 2004
360	7	"A Mysterious Spring Beetle"; Transliteration: "Fushigi na Haru no Kabutomushi" (Japanese: 不思議な春のかぶと虫)	Nana Harada	Yuko Okabe	May 17, 2004
361	8	"Teitan High School's Ghost Story (Part 1)"; Transliteration: "Teitan Koukō Gakkou Kaidan (Zenpen)" (Japanese: 帝丹高校学校怪談（前編）)	Hideaki Oniwa	N/A	May 24, 2004
362	9	"Teitan High School's Ghost Story (Part 2)"; Transliteration: "Teitan Koukō Gakkou Kaidan (Kōhen)" (Japanese: 帝丹高校学校怪談（後編）)	Hideaki Oniwa	N/A	May 31, 2004
363	10	"The City's Crows"; Transliteration: "Tokai no Karasu" (Japanese: 都会のカラス)	Rokou Ogiwara	Nobuo Ogizawa	June 7, 2004
364	11	"The Synchronicity Case (Part 1)"; Transliteration: "Shinkuronishiti Jiken (Zenpen)" (Japanese: シンクロニシティ事件（前編）)	Minoru Tozawa	Hiro Masaki	June 14, 2004
365	12	"The Synchronicity Case (Part 2)"; Transliteration: "Shinkuronishiti Jiken (Kōhen)" (Japanese: シンクロニシティ事件（後編）)	Yukio Okazaki	Hiro Masaki	June 21, 2004
366	13	"The Tragedy of the Pier in Plain Sight (Part 1)"; Transliteration: "Marumie Futō no Sangeki (Zenpen)" (Japanese: 丸見え埠頭の惨劇（前編）)	Nana Harada	N/A	July 5, 2004
367	14	"The Tragedy of the Pier in Plain Sight (Part 2)"; Transliteration: "Marumie Futō no Sangeki (Kōhen)" (Japanese: 丸見え埠頭の惨劇（後編）)	Akihiko Nishiyama	N/A	July 12, 2004
368	15	"The Candy House the Witch Lives In"; Transliteration: "Majo ga Sumu Okashi no Ie" (Japanese: 魔女が棲むお菓子の家)	Nana Harada	Michiko Tsumura Hiroshi Kashiwabara	July 26, 2004
369	16	"A Lucky Man's Suspense"; Transliteration: "Tsuiteru Otoko no Sasupensu" (Japanese: ツイてる男のサスペンス)	Hideaki Oniwa	Nobuo Ogizawa	August 2, 2004
370	17	"Running Away in a Game"; Transliteration: "Nigemawaru Geemu Sofuto" (Japanese: 逃げ回るゲームソフト)	Akihiko Nishiyama	Michiru Shimada	August 9, 2004
371	18	"A Course Without Protest (Part 1)"; Transliteration: "Mono Iwanu Kouro (Zenpen)" (Japanese: 物言わぬ航路（前編）)	Roko Ogiwara	N/A	August 23, 2004
372	19	"A Course Without Protest (Part 2)"; Transliteration: "Mono Iwanu Kouro (Kōhen)" (Japanese: 物言わぬ航路（後編）)	Roko Ogiwara	N/A	August 30, 2004
373	20	"Deadly Poisonous Spider Trap"; Transliteration: "Moudoku Kumo no Wana" (Japanese: 猛毒蜘蛛の罠)	Minoru Tozawa	Yoko Abe Hiroshi Kashiwabara	September 6, 2004
374	21	"A Code of Stars and Tobacco (Part 1)"; Transliteration: "Hoshi to Tabako no Angō (Zenpen)" (Japanese: 星と煙草の暗号（前編）)	Nana Harada	N/A	October 18, 2004
375	22	"A Code of Stars and Tobacco (Part 2)"; Transliteration: "Hoshi to Tabako no Angō (Kōhen)" (Japanese: 星と煙草の暗号（後編）)	Yasumi Mikamoto	N/A	October 25, 2004
376	23	"The Time Limit is 3 P.M.!"; Transliteration: "Taimu Rimitto wa Juugo-ji!" (Japanese: タイムリミットは15時!)	Minoru Tozawa	Naoto Kunioka Hiroshi Kashiwabara	November 1, 2004
377	24	"Momotaro Mystery Solving Tour (Part 1)"; Transliteration: "Momotarō Nazotoki Tsuaa (Zenpen)" (Japanese: 桃太郎謎解きツアー（前編）)	Masahiko Yoda	Junichi Miyashita	November 8, 2004
378	25	"Momotaro Mystery Solving Tour (Part 2)"; Transliteration: "Momotarō Nazotoki Tsuaa (Kōhen)" (Japanese: 桃太郎謎解きツアー（後編）)	Kobun Shizuno	Junichi Miyashita	November 15, 2004
379	26	"The Case of the Furisode at the Hidden Hot Spring on a Snowy Night (Part 1)"; Transliteration: "Hitō Yuki Yami Furisode Jiken (Zenpen)" (Japanese: 秘湯雪闇振袖事件（前編）)	Minoru Tozawa	Hirohito Ochi	November 22, 2004
380	27	"The Case of the Furisode at the Hidden Hot Spring on a Snowy Night (Part 2)"; Transliteration: "Hitō Yuki Yami Furisode Jiken (Kōhen)" (Japanese: 秘湯雪闇振袖事件（後編）)	Nana Harada	Hirohito Ochi	November 29, 2004
381	28	"Which One's Deduction Show (Part 1)"; Transliteration: "Docchi no Suiri Shō (Zenpen)" (Japanese: どっちの推理ショー（前編）)	Rokou Ogiwara	N/A	December 6, 2004
382	29	"Which One's Deduction Show (Part 2)"; Transliteration: "Docchi no Suiri Shō (Kōhen)" (Japanese: どっちの推理ショー（後編）)	Rokou Ogiwara	N/A	December 13, 2004
383	30	"Miracle at Koshien Ball Park! The Defiants Face the Dark Demon^{2 hrs.}" Transliteration: "Koushien no Kiseki! Mienai Akuma ni Makezu Kirai" (Japanese: 甲子園の奇跡!見えない悪魔に負けず嫌い)	Minoru Tozawa	Yasuichiro Yamamoto Masato Sato	December 20, 2004
384	31	"The Target Is Kogoro Mori"; Transliteration: "Hyouteki wa Mōri Kogoro" (Japanese: 標的は毛利小五郎)	Yasumi Mikamoto	Takeo Ohno	January 17, 2005
385	32	"The Dissonance of the Stradivarius (Overture)"; Transliteration: "Sutoradibariusu no Fukyouwaon (Zensoukyoku)" (Japanese: ストラディバリウスの不協和音（前奏曲）)	Nana Harada	N/A	January 24, 2005
386	33	"The Dissonance of the Stradivarius (Interlude)"; Transliteration: "Sutoradibariusu no Fukyouwaon (Kansoukyoku)" (Japanese: ストラディバリウスの不協和音（間奏曲）)	Roko Ogiwara	N/A	January 31, 2005
387	34	"The Dissonance of the Stradivarius (Last Tune)"; Transliteration: "Sutoradibariusu no Fukyouwaon (Gosoukyoku)" (Japanese: ストラディバリウスの不協和音（後奏曲）)	Shigeru Yamazaki	N/A	February 7, 2005
388	35	"Kogoro Gets Drunk in Satsuma (Part 1)"; Transliteration: "Satsuma ni You Kogorou (Zenpen)" (Japanese: 薩摩に酔う小五郎（前編）)	Minoru Tozawa	Nobuo Ogizawa	February 14, 2005
389	36	"Kogoro Gets Drunk in Satsuma (Part 2)"; Transliteration: "Satsuma ni You Kogorou (Kōhen)" (Japanese: 薩摩に酔う小五郎（後編）)	Yasumi Mikamoto	Nobuo Ogizawa	February 21, 2005

=== Season 14 (2005–06) ===
No.	No. in season	Title	Directed by	Written by	Original air date
390	1	"Metropolitan Police Detective Love Story 6 (Part 1)"; Transliteration: "Honchou no Keiji Koimonogatari 6 (Zenpen)" (Japanese: 本庁の刑事恋物語6（前編）)	Nana Harada	N/A	February 28, 2005
391	2	"Metropolitan Police Detective Love Story 6 (Part 2)"; Transliteration: "Honchou no Keiji Koimonogatari 6 (Kōhen)" (Japanese: 本庁の刑事恋物語6（後編）)	Minoru Tozawa	N/A	March 7, 2005
392	3	"The Mysterious Height Difference of 20cm" Transliteration: "Nazomeku Shinchousa 20 cm" (Japanese: 謎めく身長差20cm)	Roko Ogiwara	Nao Morishita	March 14, 2005
393	4	"A Kidnapping Case... So It Seems"; Transliteration: "Yuukai...Rashii Jiken" (Japanese: 誘拐...らしい事件)	Masato Sato	Nobuo Ogizawa	March 21, 2005
394	5	"Big Adventure in the Eccentric Mansion: The Seal"; Transliteration: "Kibatsu na Yashiki no Daibouken (Fuuinhen)" (Japanese: 奇抜な屋敷の大冒険(封印編))	Roko Ogiwara	N/A	April 18, 2005
395	6	"Big Adventure in the Eccentric Mansion: The Mechanism"; Transliteration: "Kibatsu na Yashiki no Daibouken (Karakurihen)" (Japanese: 奇抜な屋敷の大冒険(絡繰編))	Minoru Tozawa	N/A	April 25, 2005
396	7	"Big Adventure in the Eccentric Mansion: The Resolution"; Transliteration: "Kibatsu na Yashiki no Daibouken (Kaiketsuhen)" (Japanese: 奇抜な屋敷の大冒険（解決編）)	Roko Ogiwara	N/A	May 2, 2005
397	8	"Hot, Bitter, Sweet Soup"; Transliteration: "Karaku Nigaku Amai Shiru" (Japanese: 辛く苦く甘い汁)	Nana Harada	Takeo Ohno	May 9, 2005
398	9	"The Strange Family's Request (Part 1)"; Transliteration: "Kimyou na Ikka no Irai (Zenpen)" (Japanese: 奇妙な一家の依頼（前編）)	Minoru Tozawa	N/A	May 16, 2005
399	10	"The Strange Family's Request (Part 2)"; Transliteration: "Kimyou na Ikka no Irai (Kōhen)" (Japanese: 奇妙な一家の依頼（後編）)	Roko Ogiwara	N/A	May 23, 2005
400	11	"Ran's Suspicions"; Transliteration: "Giwaku wo Motta Ran" (Japanese: 疑惑を持った蘭)	Yasuichiro Yamamoto	Kazunari Kochi	May 30, 2005
401	12	"A Jewel Thief Caught Red-Handed (Part 1)"; Transliteration: "Houseki Goutou Genkouhan (Zenpen)" (Japanese: 宝石強盗現行犯（前編）)	Roko Ogiwara	N/A	June 6, 2005
402	13	"A Jewel Thief Caught Red-Handed (Part 2)"; Transliteration: "Houseki Goutou Genkouhan (Kōhen)" (Japanese: 宝石強盗現行犯（後編）)	Yukina Hiiro	N/A	June 13, 2005
403	14	"The Mysterious Angel's Mansion (Part 1)"; Transliteration: "Fushigi na Tenshi no Yakata (Zenpen)" (Japanese: 不思議な天使の館（前編）)	Minoru Tozawa	Nao Morishita	June 20, 2005
404	15	"The Mysterious Angel's Mansion (Part 2)"; Transliteration: "Fushigi na Tenshi no Yakata (Kōhen)" (Japanese: 不思議な天使の館（後編）)	Nana Harada	Nao Morishita	June 27, 2005
405	16	"The Man Who Called for an Ambulance"; Transliteration: "Kyuukyuusha wo Yobi ni Itta Otoko" (Japanese: 救急車を呼びに行った男)	Roko Ogiwara	Nobuo Ogizawa	July 4, 2005
406	17	"Conan and Heiji's Reasoning Magic: The Trick"; Transliteration: "Konan Heiji no Suiri Majikku (Shikakehen)" (Japanese: コナン·平次の推理マジック（仕掛編）)	Nana Harada	N/A	July 11, 2005
407	18	"Conan and Heiji's Reasoning Magic: The Mansion"; Transliteration: "Konan Heiji no Suiri Majikku (Yakatahen)" (Japanese: コナン·平次の推理マジック（館編）)	Minoru Tozawa	N/A	July 18, 2005
408	19	"Conan and Heiji's Reasoning Magic: The Resolution"; Transliteration: "Konan Heiji no Suiri Majikku (Kaiketsuhen)" (Japanese: コナン·平次の推理マジック（解決編）)	Roko Ogiwara	N/A	August 1, 2005
409	20	"The Simultaneous Stage Advance and Kidnapping (Part 1)"; Transliteration: "Douji Shinkou Butai to Yuukai (Zenpen)" (Japanese: 同時進行舞台と誘拐（前編）)	Minoru Tozawa	Junichi Miyashita	August 8, 2005
410	21	"The Simultaneous Stage Advance and Kidnapping (Part 2)"; Transliteration: "Douji Shinkou Butai to Yuukai (Kōhen)" (Japanese: 同時進行舞台と誘拐（後編）)	Nana Harada	Junichi Miyashita	August 15, 2005
411	22	"The Shinto Shrine Torii's Surprising Code (Part 1)"; Transliteration: "Jinja Torii Bikkuri Angou (Zenpen)" (Japanese: 神社鳥居ビックリ暗号（前編）)	Minoru Tozawa	N/A	August 22, 2005
412	23	"The Shinto Shrine Torii's Surprising Code (Part 2)"; Transliteration: "Jinja Torii Bikkuri Angou (Kōhen)" (Japanese: 神社鳥居ビックリ暗号（後編）)	Yasuhiro Minami	N/A	August 29, 2005
413	24	"The Half Completed Crime Mystery"; Transliteration: "Kanzen Hanbun Hanzai no Nazo" (Japanese: 完全半分犯罪の謎)	Minoru Tozawa	Nobuo Ogizawa	September 5, 2005
414	25	"The Detective Boys' Bluebird Chase"; Transliteration: "AoiTori wo Ou Tanteidan" (Japanese: 青い鳥を追う探偵団)	Nana Harada	Kazunari Kochi	September 12, 2005
415	26	"The Evil Spirit Appears on An Unlucky Day: The Case"; Transliteration: "Butsumetsu ni Deru Akuryou (Jikenhen)" (Japanese: 仏滅に出る悪霊（事件編）)	Minoru Tozawa	N/A	October 10, 2005
416	27	"The Evil Spirit Appears on An Unlucky Day: The Suspicion"; Transliteration: "Butsumetsu ni Deru Akuryou (Giwakuhen)" (Japanese: 仏滅に出る悪霊（疑惑編）)	Daiki Nishimura	N/A	October 17, 2005
417	28	"The Evil Spirit Appears on An Unlucky Day: The Solution"; Transliteration: "Butsumetsu ni Deru Akuryou (Kaiketsuhen)" (Japanese: 仏滅に出る悪霊（解決編）)	Roko Ogiwara	N/A	October 24, 2005
418	29	"Home of Beika's Grenier"; Transliteration: "Beikachō Gurunie no Ie" (Japanese: 米花町グルニエの家)	Nana Harada	Kazunari Kochi	October 31, 2005
419	30	"Sword of the Eight-Headed Serpent (Part 1)"; Transliteration: "Yamata Oorochi no Ken (Zenpen)" (Japanese: 八岐大蛇の剣（前編）)	Minoru Tozawa	Nobuo Ogizawa	November 7, 2005
420	31	"Sword of the Eight-Headed Serpent (Part 2)"; Transliteration: "Yamata Oorochi no Ken (Kōhen)" (Japanese: 八岐大蛇の剣（後編）)	Roko Ogiwara	Nobuo Ogizawa	November 14, 2005
421	32	"Gingko-Colored First Love (Part 1)"; Transliteration: "Ichou Iro no Hatsukoi (Zenpen)" (Japanese: イチョウ色の初恋（前編）)	Masato Sato	N/A	November 21, 2005
422	33	"Gingko-Colored First Love (Part 2)"; Transliteration: "Ichou Iro no Hatsukoi (Kōhen)" (Japanese: イチョウ色の初恋（後編）)	Masato Sato	N/A	November 28, 2005
423	34	"The Detective Boys and the Four Caterpillar Brothers"; Transliteration: "Tantei-dan to Aomushi Yon-kyoudai" (Japanese: 探偵団と青虫4兄弟)	Nana Harada	Kazunari Kochi	December 5, 2005
424	35	"The Photo Mail from the Clown"; Transliteration: "Piero kara no Shashin Meeru" (Japanese: ピエロからの写真メール)	Roko Ogiwara	Takeo Ohno	December 19, 2005
425	36	"Black Impact! The Moment the Organization Reaches Out!^{2.5 hrs.}" Transliteration: "Burakku Inpakuto! Soshiki no Te ga Todoku Shunkan" (Japanese: ブラックインパクト! 組織の手が届く瞬間)	Masato Sato	Kazunari Kochi	January 9, 2006
426	37	"Love Letter to Ran"; Transliteration: "Ran he no Rabu Retaa" (Japanese: 蘭へのラブレター)	Minoru Tozawa	Kazunari Kochi	January 16, 2006

=== Season 15 (2006–07) ===
No.	No. in season	Title	Directed by	Written by	Original air date
427	1	"The Super Secret Road to School (Part 1)"; Transliteration: "Chōhimitsu no Tsūgakuro (Zenpen)" (Japanese: 超秘密の通学路（前編）)	Roko Ogiwara	N/A	January 23, 2006
428	2	"The Super Secret Road to School (Part 2)"; Transliteration: "Chōhimitsu no Tsūgakuro (Kōhen)" (Japanese: 超秘密の通学路（後編）)	Roko Ogiwara	N/A	January 30, 2006
429	3	"Two People Who Can't Return (Part 1)"; Transliteration: "Mō Modorenai Futari (Zenpen)" (Japanese: もう戻れない二人（前編）)	Minoru Tozawa	N/A	February 6, 2006
430	4	"Two People Who Can't Return (Part 2)"; Transliteration: "Mō Modorenai Futari (Kōhen)" (Japanese: もう戻れない二人（後編）)	Nana Harada	N/A	February 13, 2006
431	5	"Metropolitan Police Detective Love Story 7 (Part 1)"; Transliteration: "Honchō no Keiji Koimonogatari 7 (Zenpen)" (Japanese: 本庁の刑事恋物語7（前編）)	Nana Harada	N/A	February 20, 2006
432	6	"Metropolitan Police Detective Love Story 7 (Part 2)"; Transliteration: "Honchō no Keiji Koimonogatari 7 (Kōhen)" (Japanese: 本庁の刑事恋物語7（後編）)	Takashi Sudo	N/A	February 27, 2006
433	7	"Conan: A Strange Child"; Transliteration: "Konan Hen na Ko" (Japanese: コナン変な子)	Minoru Tozawa	Takeo Ohno	March 6, 2006
434	8	"The Great Dog Coeur's Triumph"; Transliteration: "Meiken Kūru no Otegara" (Japanese: 名犬クールのお手柄)	Roko Ogiwara	Kazunari Kochi	April 10, 2006
435	9	"Information Gathered About the Detective Boys (Part 1)"; Transliteration: "Tantei-dan ni Chūme Shuzai (Zenpen)" (Japanese: 探偵団に注目取材（前編）)	Akira Tsuchiya	N/A	April 17, 2006
436	10	"Information Gathered About the Detective Boys (Part 2)"; Transliteration: "Tantei-dan ni Chūme Shuzai (Kōhen)" (Japanese: 探偵団に注目取材（後編）)	Minoru Tozawa	N/A	April 24, 2006
437	11	"Aya Ueto and Shinichi - The Promise from 4 Years Ago"; Transliteration: "Ueto Aya to Shinichi Yonenmae no Yakusoku" (Japanese: 上戸彩と新一 4年前の約束)	Masato Sato	Kazunari Kochi	May 8, 2006
438	12	"The Pursuit of the Fish E-mail"; Transliteration: "Osakana Mēru no Tsuiseki" (Japanese: お魚メールの追跡)	Takashi Sudo	N/A	May 15, 2006
439	13	"And It'd Be Nice If Everybody Disappeared"; Transliteration: "Soshite Daremo Inakunarebaī" (Japanese: そして誰もいなくなればいい)	Minoru Tozawa	Nobuo Ogizawa	May 22, 2006
440	14	"The Car Stunt's Utmost Limit"; Transliteration: "Kyokugen no Kaa Sutanto" (Japanese: 極限のカースタント)	Akira Tsuchiya	Junichi Miyashita	May 29, 2006
441	15	"The Final "Ahh""; Transliteration: "Saigo no Ān" (Japanese: 最期のアーン)	Roko Ogiwara	Takeo Ohno	June 5, 2006
442	16	"The Man Obstructed by the Steel Frame"; Transliteration: "Tekkotsu ni Habamareta Otoko" (Japanese: 鉄骨に阻まれた男)	Yasuyuki Shinozaki	Nobuo Ogizawa	June 12, 2006
443	17	"Clam Digging With a Sigh (Part 1)"; Transliteration: "Tameiki Shiohigari (Zenpen)" (Japanese: ため息潮干狩り（前編）)	Minoru Tozawa	N/A	June 26, 2006
444	18	"Clam Digging With a Sigh (Part 2)"; Transliteration: "Tameiki Shiohigari (Kōhen)" (Japanese: ため息潮干狩り（後編）)	Roko Ogiwara	N/A	July 3, 2006
445	19	"Secret of the Russian Blue"; Transliteration: "Roshian Burū no Himitsu" (Japanese: ロシアンブルーの秘密)	Akira Tsuchiya	N/A	July 10, 2006
446	20	"The Sealed Western-Style Window (Part 1)"; Transliteration: "Fūin-sareta Yōsō (Zenpen)" (Japanese: 封印された洋窓（前編）)	Takashi Sudo	N/A	July 24, 2006
447	21	"The Sealed Western-Style Window (Part 2)"; Transliteration: "Fūin-sareta Yōsō (Kōhen)" (Japanese: 封印された洋窓（後編）)	Yasuyuki Shinozaki	N/A	July 31, 2006
448	22	"The Meguro Sanma Case"; Transliteration: "Meguro no Sanma Jiken" (Japanese: 目黒の秋刀魚事件)	Minoru Tozawa	Takeo Ohno	August 14, 2006
449	23	"Metropolitan Police Love Story - Fake Wedding^{1 hr.}" Transliteration: "Honchō no Keiji Koimonogatari Itsuwari no Uedingu" (Japanese: 本庁の刑事恋物語 偽りのウエディング)	Masato Sato	Kazunari Kochi	August 21, 2006
450	24	"Trick vs. Magic (Part 1)"; Transliteration: "Torikku vs Majikku (Zenpen)" (Japanese: トリックvsマジック（前編）)	Roko Ogiwara	Kazunari Kochi	August 28, 2006
451	25	"Trick vs. Magic (Part 2)"; Transliteration: "Torikku vs Majikku (Kōhen)" (Japanese: トリックvsマジック（後編）)	Akira Tsuchiya	Kazunari Kochi	September 4, 2006
452	26	"The Phantom of the Konpira^{1 hr.}" Transliteration: "Konpira-za no Kaijin" (Japanese: こんぴら座の怪人)	Minoru Tozawa	Junichi Miyashita	September 11, 2006
453	27	"Preview Screening of Fate and Friendship"; Transliteration: "Innen to Yūjō no Shishakai" (Japanese: 因縁と友情の試写会)	Yasuichiro Yamamoto	N/A	October 23, 2006
454	28	"The Overturned Conclusion (Part 1)"; Transliteration: "Hikkurikaetta Ketsumatsu (Zenpen)" (Japanese: ひっくり返った結末（前編）)	Minoru Tozawa	N/A	October 30, 2006
455	29	"The Overturned Conclusion (Part 2)"; Transliteration: "Hikkurikaetta Ketsumatsu (Kōhen)" (Japanese: ひっくり返った結末（後編）)	Kazunobu Shimizu	N/A	November 6, 2006
456	30	"The Mystery I Loved"; Transliteration: "Ore ga Aishita Misuterī" (Japanese: 俺が愛したミステリー)	Noriaki Saito	Nobuo Ogizawa	November 13, 2006
457	31	"Sonoko's Red Handkerchief (Part 1)"; Transliteration: "Sonoko no Akai Hankachi (Zenpen)" (Japanese: 園子の赤いハンカチ（前編）)	Toshihiro Ishikawa	N/A	November 20, 2006
458	32	"Sonoko's Red Handkerchief (Part 2)"; Transliteration: "Sonoko no Akai Hankachi (Kōhen)" (Japanese: 園子の赤いハンカチ（後編）)	Shino Sudo	N/A	November 27, 2006
459	33	"A Mysterious Man - Overly Strict with Regulations"; Transliteration: "Kaijin Gachigachi Kisoku Otoko" (Japanese: 怪人ガチガチ規則男)	Minoru Tozawa	Nobuo Ogizawa	December 4, 2006
460	34	"Class 1-B's Great Operation!"; Transliteration: "Ichi-nen B-Gumi Daisakusen!" (Japanese: 1年B組大作戦!)	Takahiro Okada	N/A	January 15, 2007
461	35	"The Missing Page"; Transliteration: "Kieta Ichi Pēji" (Japanese: 消えた1ページ)	Toshihiro Ishikawa	Aki Kajiwara	January 22, 2007
462	36	"The Shadow of the Black Organization - The Young Witness"; Transliteration: "Kuro no Soshiki no Kage Osanai Mokugekisha" (Japanese: 黒の組織の影 幼い目撃者)	Minoru Tozawa	N/A	January 29, 2007
463	37	"The Shadow of the Black Organization - The Strange Illumination"; Transliteration: "Kuro no Soshiki no Kage Kimyō na Shōmei" (Japanese: 黒の組織の影 奇妙な照明)	Takahiro Okada	N/A	February 5, 2007
464	38	"The Shadow of the Black Organization - The Mystery of the Big Reward"; Transliteration: "Kuro no Soshiki no Kage Nazo no Kōgaku Hōshū" (Japanese: 黒の組織の影 謎の高額報酬)	Shuji Miyahara	N/A	February 12, 2007
465	39	"The Shadow of the Black Organization - Shining Star of Pearl"; Transliteration: "Kuro no Soshiki no Kage Shinju no Nagareboshi" (Japanese: 黒の組織の影 真珠の流れ星)	Kobun Shizuno	N/A	February 19, 2007

== Home media release ==
=== Region 2 ===
The Region 2 DVD compilations of the Detective Conan anime are released by Shogakukan and grouped by parts.

Shogakukan (Japan, Region 2 DVD)
Volume		Episodes^{Jp.}	Release date	Ref.
Part 1	Volume 1	1–4	February 24, 2006	
Part 1	Volume 2	5–8	February 24, 2006	
Part 1	Volume 3	9–11	February 24, 2006	
Part 1	Volume 4	12–15	February 24, 2006	
Part 1	Volume 5	16–19	February 24, 2006	
Part 1	Volume 6	20–23	February 24, 2006	
Part 1	Volume 7	24–25, 27-28	February 24, 2006	
Part 2	Volume 1	26, 29–31	February 24, 2006	
Part 2	Volume 2	32–35	February 24, 2006	
Part 2	Volume 3	36–38, 41	February 24, 2006	
Part 2	Volume 4	39–40, 42–43	February 24, 2006	
Part 2	Volume 5	44–47	February 24, 2006	
Part 2	Volume 6	48–51	February 24, 2006	
Part 2	Volume 7	52–54	February 24, 2006	
Part 3	Volume 1	55–58	March 24, 2006	
Part 3	Volume 2	59–62	March 24, 2006	
Part 3	Volume 3	63–66	March 24, 2006	
Part 3	Volume 4	67–70	March 24, 2006	
Part 3	Volume 5	71–74	March 24, 2006	
Part 3	Volume 6	75–76, 79	March 24, 2006	
Part 3	Volume 7	77–78, 81–82	March 24, 2006	
Part 4	Volume 1	80, 83–85	March 24, 2006	
Part 4	Volume 2	86–89	March 24, 2006	
Part 4	Volume 3	90–93	March 24, 2006	
Part 4	Volume 4	96	March 24, 2006	
Part 4	Volume 5	94–95, 98–99	March 24, 2006	
Part 4	Volume 6	100–103	March 24, 2006	
Part 4	Volume 7	97, 104–106	March 24, 2006	
Part 5	Volume 1	107–109, 112	March 24, 2006	
Part 5	Volume 2	110–111, 114–115	March 24, 2006	
Part 5	Volume 3	113, 116–117, 119	March 24, 2006	
Part 5	Volume 4	118, 120, 123	March 24, 2006	
Part 5	Volume 5	121–122, 124–125	March 24, 2006	
Part 5	Volume 6	126–127, 130–131	March 24, 2006	
Part 5	Volume 7	128, 132–134	March 24, 2006	
Part 5	Volume 8	129	March 24, 2006	
Part 6	Volume 1	135–137 & 140	October 25, 2000	
Part 6	Volume 2	138–139, 141–142	October 25, 2000	
Part 6	Volume 3	143–145, 148	November 25, 2000	
Part 6	Volume 4	146–147 149, 152	November 25, 2000	
Part 6	Volume 5	150–151, 153–154	December 25, 2000	
Part 6	Volume 6	155–158	December 25, 2000	
Part 6	Volume 7	159–160, 162	December 25, 2000	
Part 7	Volume 1	161, 163–165	May 25, 2001	
Part 7	Volume 2	166–169	June 25, 2001	
Part 7	Volume 3	170–173	July 25, 2001	
Part 7	Volume 4	174	August 25, 2001	
Part 7	Volume 5	175–178	September 25, 2001	
Part 7	Volume 6	179–182	October 25, 2001	
Part 7	Volume 7	183–184, 187	November 25, 2001	
Part 7	Volume 8	185–186, 188–189	December 15, 2001	
Part 7	Volume 9	190–193	January 15, 2002	
Part 8	Volume 1	194–196, 207	March 25, 2002	
Part 8	Volume 2	197–200	April 25, 2002	
Part 8	Volume 3	201–204	May 25, 2002	
Part 8	Volume 4	205–206, 208	June 25, 2002	
Part 8	Volume 5	209–211, 214	July 25, 2002	
Part 8	Volume 6	212–213, 215–216	August 25, 2002	
Part 8	Volume 7	219	September 25, 2002	
Part 9	Volume 1	217–218, 220–221	December 25, 2002	
Part 9	Volume 2	222–225	January 25, 2003	
Part 9	Volume 3	226–229	February 25, 2003	
Part 9	Volume 4	230–232, 235	March 25, 2003	
Part 9	Volume 5	234–237	April 25, 2003	
Part 9	Volume 6	238–241	May 25, 2003	
Part 9	Volume 7	242–245	June 25, 2003	
Part 9	Volume 8	246–248, 251	June 25, 2003	
Part 9	Volume 9	249–250, 253–254	August 25, 2003	
Part 10	Volume 1	252, 255–257	October 22, 2004	
Part 10	Volume 2	258–259, 261–262	October 22, 2004	
Part 10	Volume 3	260, 266–268	November 26, 2004	
Part 10	Volume 4	263, 273	November 26, 2004	
Part 10	Volume 5	264–265, 269–270	December 24, 2004	
Part 10	Volume 6	271–272, 274–275	December 24, 2004	
Part 10	Volume 7	276–278, 281	January 21, 2005	
Part 10	Volume 8	279–280, 282–283	January 21, 2005	
Part 10	Volume 9	284–285, 289–290	February 25, 2005	
Part 11	Volume 1	286–288, 296	March 25, 2005	
Part 11	Volume 2	291–293, 303	March 25, 2005	
Part 11	Volume 3	291–293, 303	April 22, 2005	
Part 11	Volume 4	299–302	April 22, 2005	
Part 11	Volume 5	304, 314	May 27, 2005	
Part 11	Volume 6	295–308	May 27, 2005	
Part 11	Volume 7	209–311, 315	June 24, 2005	
Part 11	Volume 8	312–313, 320, 328	June 24, 2005	
Part 12	Volume 1	316–319	July 22, 2005	
Part 12	Volume 2	321–324	July 22, 2005	
Part 12	Volume 3	325-348	August 26, 2005	
Part 12	Volume 4	329–332	August 26, 2005	
Part 12	Volume 5	333–336	September 22, 2005	
Part 12	Volume 6	338–341	September 22, 2005	
Part 12	Volume 7	342–344	October 28, 2005	
Part 12	Volume 8	345	October 28, 2005	
Part 12	Volume 9	346–349	November 25, 2005	
Part 12	Volume 10	350–353	November 25, 2005	
Part 13	Volume 1	354–356	December 23, 2005	
Part 13	Volume 2	357–360	December 23, 2005	
Part 13	Volume 3	361–363, 368	January 27, 2006	
Part 13	Volume 4	364–367	January 27, 2006	
Part 13	Volume 5	369–372	February 24, 2006	
Part 13	Volume 6	373–376	February 24, 2006	
Part 13	Volume 7	377–380	March 24, 2006	
Part 13	Volume 8	381–382, 388–389	March 24, 2006	
Part 13	Volume 9	383	April 28, 2006	
Part 13	Volume 10	384–387	April 28, 2006	
Part 14	Volume 1	390–393	May 26, 2006	
Part 14	Volume 2	394–397	May 26, 2006	
Part 14	Volume 3	398–400, 405	June 23, 2006	
Part 14	Volume 4	401–404	June 23, 2006	
Part 14	Volume 5	406–408, 413	July 28, 2006	
Part 14	Volume 6	409–412	July 28, 2006	
Part 14	Volume 7	414–417	August 25, 2006	
Part 14	Volume 8	418–420, 423	August 25, 2006	
Part 14	Volume 9	421–422, 424, 426	September 22, 2006	
Part 14	Volume 10	425	October 27, 2006	
Part 15	Volume 1	427–430	December 22, 2006	
Part 15	Volume 2	431–434	January 26, 2007	
Part 15	Volume 3	435–438	February 23, 2007	
Part 15	Volume 4	439–442	March 23, 2007	
Part 15	Volume 5	443–445, 448	April 27, 2007	
Part 15	Volume 6	446–447, 449	May 25, 2007	
Part 15	Volume 7	450–452	June 29, 2007	
Part 15	Volume 8	453–456	July 29, 2007	
Part 15	Volume 9	457–460	August 24, 2007	
Part 15	Volume 10	462–465	September 28, 2007	

=== Region 1 ===
The Region 1 DVD compilations of the Case Closed anime are released by Funimation Entertainment. Although Cartoon Network stopped ordering episodes, Funimation continued to dub the series direct-to-DVD and episodes 1–4 and 53–83 were released eleven DVD volumes released between August 24, 2004, and July 26, 2005. Funimation then redesigned its DVD volumes and episodes 1–52 were released in eight DVD volumes between February 21, 2006, and May 29, 2007. The series was later released in five seasonal DVD boxes between July 22, 2008, and May 12, 2009, containing 130 episodes in total. The seasonal boxes were then re-released as a part of Funimation's Viridian Edition line between July 14, 2009, and March 23, 2010.

Funimation Entertainment (USA, Region 1 DVD)
Case Closed DVD volumes	Episodes^{Eng.}	Release date	Ref.
Case 1, Vol. 1: Secret Life of Jimmy Kudo	1–4	August 24, 2004	
Case 4, Vol. 1: Deadly Illusions	53–55	August 24, 2004	
Case 4. Vol. 2: The Desperate Truth	56–58	October 12, 2004	
Case 4, Vol. 3: Like Old Times	59–61	November 23, 2004	
Case 4, Vol. 4: Broken Dreams	62–64	January 11, 2005	
Case 4, Vol. 5: Dubious Intent	65–67	March 1, 2005	
Case 5, Vol. 1: The Truth About Revenge	68–69, 73	April 19, 2005	
Case 5, Vol. 2: The Knight Baron Mystery	70–72	June 7, 2005	
Case 5, Vol. 3: Triple Threat	74–76	August 26, 2005	
Case 5, Vol. 4: The Phantom Thief Kid	78–81	October 11, 2005	
Case 5, Vol. 5: Covering Up	77, 82–83	December 20, 2005	
Case 1, Vol. 1: The Investigation is Afoot	1–9	February 21, 2006	
Case 1, Vol. 2: In Hot Pursuit	10–15	May 2, 2006	
Case 1, Vol. 3: Ill-Fated Imposters	16–21	July 11, 2006	
Case 1, Vol. 4: Wrong Answers Resolved	22–27	September 19, 2006	
Case 2 Vol 1: The Exploits of Genius	28–33	November 28, 2006	
Case 2, Vol. 2: Cracking the Perfect Alibi	34–39	February 6, 2007	
Case 3, Vol. 1: Behind the Facade	40–45	April 3, 2007	
Case 3, Vol. 2: Death Wears a Blindfold	46–52	May 29, 2007	

Funimation Entertainment (USA, Region 1 DVD)
Season	Episodes	Regular Edition release date	Viridian Edition release date	Ref.
Season 1	1-26	March 24, 2006	July 14, 2009	
Season 2	27-52	September 30, 2008	September 15, 2009	
Season 3	53-79	November 25, 2008	March 23, 2010	
Season 4	80-105	February 17, 2009	March 23, 2010	
Season 5	106-130	May 12, 2009	March 23, 2010	

== Notes ==
- ^Jp. The episode's numbering as followed in Japan
- ^Eng. The episode's numbering as followed by Funimation Entertainment
- ^1 hr. The episodes were aired as a single hour long episode in Japan
- ^2 hrs. The episodes were aired as a single two-hour long episode in Japan
- ^2.5 hrs. The episodes were aired as a single two-hour and thirty minutes long episode in Japan
- ^A These episodes are part of the second season of Case Closed
- ^B These episodes are part of the third season of Case Closed
- ^C These episodes are part of the fourth season of Case Closed
- ^D These episodes are part of the fifth season of Case Closed
