= Lists of Case Closed episodes =

Case Closed is a Japanese manga with anime television adaptation.

== Episodes ==
=== Seasons ===
- List of Case Closed episodes (seasons 1–15)
- List of Case Closed episodes (seasons 16–30)
- List of Case Closed episodes (seasons 31–current)
