= List of Case Closed episodes (seasons 16–30) =

Episodes 466-999 of Case Closed

Second North American anime key visual featuring Gin, Vodka, Shinichi Kudo (Jimmy Kudo), Genta Kojima (George Kaminski), Ayumi Yoshida (Amy Yeager), Mitsuhiko Tsuburaya (Mitch Tennison) (left), Kogoro Mori (Richard Moore), Ran Mori (Rachel Moore), Conan Edogawa (center), Heiji Hattori (Harley Hartwell), Kid the Phantom Thief (Kaito Kid), Ai Haibara (Anita Hailey), and Vermouth (right)

The Case Closed anime series, known as Meitantei Conan (名探偵コナン, lit. Great Detective Conan, officially translated as Detective Conan) in its original release in Japan, is based on the manga series of the same name by Gosho Aoyama. It was localized in English as Case Closed by Funimation due to unspecified legal problems. The anime is produced by TMS Entertainment and Yomiuri Telecasting Corporation with the directors being Kenji Kodama, Yasuichiro Yamamoto, Masato Satō, Kōjin Ochi, and Nobuharu Kamanaka. The series follows the teenage detective Jimmy Kudo, who transforms into a child after being poisoned with APTX 4869 by the Black Organization. Now named Conan Edogawa and living with the Moores, Conan solves murders during his daily life as he awaits the day to defeat the Black Organization.

Case Closed premiered on January 8, 1996 on Yomiuri TV, Nippon Television and their affiliates in Japan and is currently ongoing. It has aired over 1100 episodes in Japan making it the fifteenth longest running anime series. In 2010, Yomiuri Telecasting Corporation began making the episodes available for video on demand. The anime spun off theatrical films, two OVA series and a TV special titled Lupin the 3rd vs Detective Conan, these spin offs were created with the same staff and cast as the anime series. The theme music supplier for the series was initially Universal Music Group, whom released the first two openings and ending theme songs, and is currently Being Incorporated.

In 2003, the first 104 episodes were licensed by Funimation for distribution in North America under the name Case Closed where it debuted on Cartoon Network's Adult Swim programming block on May 24, 2004, no more than 50 episodes were licensed from Funimation due to low ratings. The Canadian channel YTV picked up the Case Closed series and broadcast 22 episodes between April 7, 2006, and September 2, 2006, before taking it off the air. Funimation made the series available with the launch of the Funimation Channel in November 2005 and was temporarily available on Colours TV during its syndication with the Funimation Channel. Funimation began streaming Case Closed episodes on their website in March 2013.

A separate English adaptation of the series by Animax Asia premiered in the Philippines on January 18, 2006, under the name Detective Conan. Because Animax were unable to obtain further TV broadcast rights, their version comprised 52 episodes. The series continued with reruns until August 7, 2006, when it was removed from the station. Meitantei Conan has also been localized in other languages such as French, German, and Italian. As of 2018, the Detective Conan anime has been broadcast in 40 countries around the world.Crunchyroll began simulcasting the series in October 2014, starting with episode 754. It was revealed in February 2023 that TMS Entertainment commissioned a new English dub of Case Closed, with episodes of the anime beginning streaming on Tubi that same month, starting at episode 965. This marked the first English dub for the series since 2010. The dub is produced by Florida-based studio Macias Group with a new dub cast (except for the voices of Shinichi, Conan, Ran, Kogoro, and Kaito Kid, whose voice actors were retained from the Bang Zoom! Entertainment home video dubs).

== Seasons overview ==
These "seasons" are based on the Japanese DVDs released by Shogakukan starting on October 25, 2000. (see Home media release section) In Japan, Case Closed runs continuously on TV with very few weeks off.

Season	Episodes	Originally released	
Season	Episodes	First released	Last released
16	25	February 26, 2007	December 3, 2007
17	33	January 14, 2008	March 2, 2009
18	42	February 9, 2009	February 6, 2010
19	40	February 27, 2010	February 12, 2011
20	40	February 19, 2011	February 11, 2012
21	35	February 18, 2012	December 15, 2012
22	38	February 15, 2013	November 16, 2013
23	21	November 23, 2013	May 17, 2014
24	39	May 31, 2014	May 16, 2015
25	39	May 30, 2015	May 14, 2016
26	39	May 21, 2016	April 22, 2017
27	41	April 29, 2017	March 24, 2018
28	29	April 7, 2018	December 22, 2018
29	33	January 5, 2019	November 16, 2019
30	40	November 23, 2019	February 27, 2021

== Episodes ==
=== Season 16 (2007) ===
No.	No. in season	Title	Directed by	Written by	Original air date
466	1	"The Unsmashable Snowman (Part 1)"; Transliteration: "Warenai Yukidaruma (Zenpen)" (Japanese: 割れない雪だるま（前編）)	Minoru Tozawa	N/A	February 26, 2007
467	2	"The Unsmashable Snowman (Part 2)"; Transliteration: "Warenai Yukidaruma (Kōhen)" (Japanese: 割れない雪だるま（後編）)	Nobuharu Kamanaka	N/A	March 5, 2007
468	3	"The Mysterious Case Near the Pond"; Transliteration: "Ike no Hotori no Kaijiken" (Japanese: 池のほとりの怪事件)	Masato Sato	Nobuo Ogizawa	March 12, 2007
469	4	"Kaitou Kid and the Four Masterpieces (Part 1)"; Transliteration: "Kaitō Kiddo to yon Meiga (Zenpen)" (Japanese: 怪盗キッドと4名画（前編）)	Minoru Tozawa	N/A	April 16, 2007
470	5	"Kaitou Kid and the Four Masterpieces (Part 2)"; Transliteration: "Kaitō Kiddo to yon Meiga (Kōhen)" (Japanese: 怪盗キッドと4名画（後編）)	Nobuharu Kamanaka	N/A	April 23, 2007
471	6	"The Uncontrollable Rental Car"; Transliteration: "Rentakā Seigyo Funō" (Japanese: レンタカー制御不能)	Nobuharu Kamanaka	Takeo Ohno	May 7, 2007
472	7	"Shinichi Kudo's Childhood Adventure (Part 1)"; Transliteration: "Kudō Shinichi Shōnen no Bōken (Zenpen)" (Japanese: 工藤新一少年の冒険（前編）)	Minoru Tozawa	N/A	May 14, 2007
473	8	"Shinichi Kudo's Childhood Adventure (Part 2)"; Transliteration: "Kudō Shinichi Shōnen no Bōken (Kōhen)" (Japanese: 工藤新一少年の冒険（後編）)	Yasuo Ejima	N/A	May 21, 2007
474	9	"The Love of Lawyer Eri Kisaki"; Transliteration: "Kisaki Eri Bengoshi no Koi" (Japanese: 妃英理弁護士の恋)	Noriaki Saito	N/A	June 4, 2007
475	10	"Bad Luck Grand Prix"; Transliteration: "Akūn Guran Puri" (Japanese: 悪運グランプリ)	Minoru Tozawa	Nobuo Ogizawa	June 18, 2007
476	11	"Genta's Certain Kill Shot (Part 1)"; Transliteration: "Genta no Hissatsu Shūto (Zenpen)" (Japanese: 元太の必殺シュート（前編）)	Masahiro Hosoda	N/A	June 25, 2007
477	12	"Genta's Certain Kill Shot (Part 2)"; Transliteration: "Genta no Hissatsu Shūto (Kōhen)" (Japanese: 元太の必殺シュート（後編）)	Takashi Sano	N/A	July 2, 2007
478	13	"Real 30 Minutes"; Transliteration: "Riaru 30 Minittsu" (Japanese: リアル30ミニッツ)	Nobuharu Kamanaka	Hiroshi Kashiwabara	July 9, 2007
479	14	"Three Days With Heiji Hattori ^{2 hrs.}" Transliteration: "Hattori Heiji to no Mikkakan" (Japanese: 服部平次との三日間)	Nobuharu Kamanaka	Kazunari Kochi	July 16, 2007
480	15	"Yellow Alibi"; Transliteration: "Kiiroi Fuzai Shōmei" (Japanese: 黄色い不在証明)	Minoru Tozawa	Takeo Ohno	July 23, 2007
481	16	"Mountain Witch's Cutlery (Part 1)"; Transliteration: "Yamanba no Hamono (Zenpen)" (Japanese: 山姥の刃物（前編）)	Jun Takahashi Yusuke Takane (Note: Assistant director)	N/A	July 30, 2007
482	17	"Mountain Witch's Cutlery (Part 2)"; Transliteration: "Yamanba no Hamono (Kōhen)" (Japanese: 山姥の刃物（後編）)	Yasuo Ejima	N/A	August 6, 2007
483	18	"The Missing Policeman"; Transliteration: "Kieta Omawarisan" (Japanese: 消えたおまわりさん)	Makoto Nagao	Nobuo Ogizawa	August 13, 2007
484	19	"Whereabouts of the Dark Photograph (Part 1)"; Transliteration: "Kuroi Shashin no Yukue (Zenpen)" (Japanese: 黒い写真の行方（前編）)	Masami Furukawa	N/A	August 20, 2007
485	20	"Whereabouts of the Dark Photograph (Part 2)"; Transliteration: "Kuroi Shashin no Yukue (Kōhen)" (Japanese: 黒い写真の行方（後編）)	Yasuo Ejima	N/A	August 27, 2007
486	21	"Beckoning Cat from Right to Left"; Transliteration: "Migi Kara Hidari e Manekineko" (Japanese: 右から左へ招き猫)	Masuku Taiga	Takeo Ohno	September 3, 2007
487	22	"Metropolitan Police Detective Love Story 8: The Left Hand's Ring Finger^{1 hr.}" Transliteration: "Honchō no Keiji Koi Monogatari 8 Hidaride no Kusuriyubi" (Japanese: 本庁の刑事恋物語8 左手の薬指)	Minoru Tozawa	N/A	October 15, 2007
488	23	"Devil of the TV Station^{1 hr.}" Transliteration: "Terebikyoku no Akuma" (Japanese: テレビ局の悪魔)	Masuku Taiga Makoto Nagao	Kazunari Kochi	October 22, 2007
489	24	"Courtroom Confrontation III: Prosecutor as Eyewitness^{1 hr.}" Transliteration: "Hotei no Taiketsu 3 Mokugekisha wa Kensatsukan" (Japanese: 法廷の対決III 目撃者は検察官)	Yasuichiro Yamamoto	Yutaka Kaneko	November 26, 2007
490	25	"Heiji Hattori vs. Shinichi Kudo: Deduction Battle on the Ski Slope^{1 hr.}" Transliteration: "Hattori Heiji vs Kudō Shinichi Gerende no Suiri Taiketsu" (Japanese: 服部平次 vs 工藤新一ゲレンデの推理対決)	Minoru Tozawa Nobuharu Kamanaka Yoshio Suzuki	N/A	December 3, 2007

=== Season 17 (2008–09) ===
No.	No. in season	Title	Directed by	Written by	Original air date
491	1	"The Clash of Red and Black (The Beginning)"; Transliteration: "Aka to Kuro no Kurasshu (Hattan)" (Japanese: 赤と黒のクラッシュ （発端）)	Minoru Tozawa	Kazunari Kochi	January 14, 2008
492	2	"The Clash of Red and Black (Blood Relative)"; Transliteration: "Aka to Kuro no Kurasshu (Ketsuen)" (Japanese: 赤と黒のクラッシュ （血縁）)	Minoru Tozawa	Kazunari Kochi	January 21, 2008
493	3	"The Clash of Red and Black (Exclamation)"; Transliteration: "Aka to Kuro no Kurasshu (Zekkyō)" (Japanese: 赤と黒のクラッシュ （絶叫）)	Nobuharu Kamanaka	Kazunari Kochi	January 28, 2008
494	4	"The Clash of Red and Black (Hades)"; Transliteration: "Aka to Kuro no Kurasshu (Meido)" (Japanese: 赤と黒のクラッシュ （冥土）)	Koichiro Kuroda	Kazunari Kochi	February 4, 2008
495	5	"The Clash of Red and Black (Coma)"; Transliteration: "Aka to Kuro no Kurasshu (Konsui)" (Japanese: 赤と黒のクラッシュ （昏睡）)	Shigeru Yamazaki	Kazunari Kochi	February 11, 2008
496	6	"The Clash of Red and Black (Invasion)"; Transliteration: "Aka to Kuro no Kurasshu (Shinnyū)" (Japanese: 赤と黒のクラッシュ （侵入）)	Minoru Tozawa	Kazunari Kochi	February 18, 2008
497	7	"The Clash of Red and Black (Awakening)"; Transliteration: "Aka to Kuro no Kurasshu (Kakusei)" (Japanese: 赤と黒のクラッシュ （覚醒）)	Masahiro Hosoda	Kazunari Kochi	February 25, 2008
498	8	"The Clash of Red and Black (Disturbance)"; Transliteration: "Aka to Kuro no Kurasshu (Kakuran)" (Japanese: 赤と黒のクラッシュ （攪乱）)	Shigeru Yamazaki	Kazunari Kochi	March 3, 2008
499	9	"The Clash of Red and Black (Disguise)"; Transliteration: "Aka to Kuro no Kurasshu (Gisō)" (Japanese: 赤と黒のクラッシュ （偽装）)	Koichiro Kuroda Yuji Uchida	Kazunari Kochi	March 10, 2008
500	10	"The Clash of Red and Black (Testament)"; Transliteration: "Aka to Kuro no Kurasshu (Yuigon)" (Japanese: 赤と黒のクラッシュ （遺言）)	Minoru Tozawa	Kazunari Kochi	March 17, 2008
501	11	"The Clash of Red and Black (Suspicion)"; Transliteration: "Aka to Kuro no Kurasshu (Kengi)" (Japanese: 赤と黒のクラッシュ （嫌疑）)	Masahiro Hosoda	Kazunari Kochi	April 14, 2008
502	12	"The Clash of Red and Black (Innocence)"; Transliteration: "Aka to Kuro no Kurasshu (Keppaku)" (Japanese: 赤と黒のクラッシュ （潔白）)	Shigeru Yamazaki	Kazunari Kochi	April 28, 2008
503	13	"The Clash of Red and Black (Ready to Die)"; Transliteration: "Aka to Kuro no Kurasshu (Kesshi)" (Japanese: 赤と黒のクラッシュ （決死）)	Nobuharu Kamanaka	Kazunari Kochi	May 12, 2008
504	14	"The Clash of Red and Black (Killed in the Line of Duty)"; Transliteration: "Aka to Kuro no Kurasshu (Junshoku)" (Japanese: 赤と黒のクラッシュ （殉職）)	Masato Sato	Kazunari Kochi	May 19, 2008
505	15	"Lawyer Eri Kisaki's Testimony (Part 1)"; Transliteration: "Bengoshi Kisaki Eri no Shōgen (Zenpen)" (Japanese: 弁護士妃英理の証言（前編）)	Minoru Tozawa	N/A	June 16, 2008
506	16	"Lawyer Eri Kisaki's Testimony (Part 2)"; Transliteration: "Bengoshi Kisaki Eri no Shōgen (Kōhen)" (Japanese: 弁護士妃英理の証言（後編）)	Kouichiro Kuroda	N/A	June 23, 2008
507	17	"The Blind Spot in the Karaoke Box (Part 1)"; Transliteration: "Karaoke Bokkusu no Shikaku (Zenpen)" (Japanese: カラオケボックスの死角（前編）)	Masahiro Hosoda	N/A	June 30, 2008
508	18	"The Blind Spot in the Karaoke Box (Part 2)"; Transliteration: "Karaoke Bokkusu no Shikaku (Kōhen)" (Japanese: カラオケボックスの死角（後編）)	Shigeru Yamazaki	N/A	July 7, 2008
509	19	"Red, White, Yellow, and the Detective Boys"; Transliteration: "Aka, Shiro, Kiiro, to Tanteidan" (Japanese: 赤白黄色と探偵団)	Nobuharu Kamanaka	N/A	July 14, 2008
510	20	"Conan vs. Double Code Mystery"; Transliteration: "Conan vs Daburu Angō Misuterī" (Japanese: コナンvs W 暗号ミステリー)	Minoru Tozawa	N/A	July 28, 2008
511	21	"Deduction Showdown! Shinichi vs. Subaru Okiya"; Transliteration: "Suiri Taiketsu! Shinichi vs. Okiya Subaru" (Japanese: 推理対決!新一VS沖矢昴)	Koichiro Kuroda	N/A	August 4, 2008
512	22	"The Broken Horoscope"; Transliteration: "Kudaketa Horosucōpu" (Japanese: 砕けたホロスコープ)	Masahiro Hosoda	Toyoto Kogiso	August 11, 2008
513	23	"Coffee Aroma with Murderous Intention (Part 1)"; Transliteration: "Satsui wa Kōhī no Kaori (Zenpen)" (Japanese: 殺意はコーヒーの香り（前編）)	Yasuichiro Yamamoto	N/A	September 1, 2008
514	24	"Coffee Aroma with Murderous Intention (Part 2)"; Transliteration: "Satsui wa Kōhī no Kaori (Kōhen)" (Japanese: 殺意はコーヒーの香り（後編）)	Yoshio Suzuki	N/A	September 8, 2008
515	25	"Kaitou Kid's Teleportation Magic^{1 hr.}" Transliteration: "Kaitō Kiddo no Terepōtēshon Majikku" (Japanese: 怪盗キッドの瞬間移動魔術)	Shigeru Yamazaki	N/A	October 20, 2008
516	26	"Fūrinkazan - The Mysterious Armoured Warrior^{1 hr.}" Transliteration: "Fūrinkazan Meikyū no Yoroimusha" (Japanese: 風林火山 迷宮の鎧武者)	Nobuharu Kamanaka	N/A	November 3, 2008
517	27	"Fūrinkazan - Shadow and Lightning Conclusion"; Transliteration: "Fūrinkazan Kage to Raikō no Ketchaku" (Japanese: 風林火山 陰と雷光の決着)	Minoru Tozawa	N/A	November 10, 2008
518	28	"Meiji Restoration Mystery Tour (Investigation Chapter)"; Transliteration: "Meiji Ishin Mystery Tour (Tansakuhen)" (Japanese: 明治維新ミステリーツアー（探索編）)	Nobuharu Kamanaka	Yoichi Kato	December 1, 2008
519	29	"Meiji Restoration Mystery Tour (Decipher Chapter)"; Transliteration: "Meiji Ishin Mystery Tour (Kaidokuhen)" (Japanese: 明治維新ミステリーツアー（解読編）)	Nobuharu Kamanaka	Yoichi Kato	December 8, 2008
520	30	"Red Wine Indictment"; Transliteration: "Wain Reddo no Kokuhatsu" (Japanese: ワインレッドの告発)	Masahiro Hosoda Tomoya Tanaka (Note: Assistant director)	Hiro Masaki	December 15, 2008
521	31	"Murderer, Shinichi Kudo^{1 hr.}" Transliteration: "Satsujinhan, Kudō Shinichi" (Japanese: 殺人犯、工藤新一)	Minoru Tozawa	N/A	January 19, 2009
522	32	"Shinichi's True Face and Ran's Tears^{1 hr.}" Transliteration: "Shinichi no Shōtai ni Ran no Namida" (Japanese: 新一の正体に蘭の涙)	Shigeru Yamazaki	N/A	January 26, 2009
523	33	"What She Truly Wants to Ask"; Transliteration: "Hontō ni Kikitai Koto" (Japanese: 本当に聞きたいコト)	Koichiro Kuroda	N/A	February 2, 2009

=== Season 18 (2009–10) ===
No.	No. in season	Title	Directed by	Written by	Original air date
524	1	"The Blue Spark of Hate (Part 1)"; Transliteration: "Nikushimi no Aoi Hibana (Zenpen)" (Japanese: 憎しみの青い火花（前編）)	Minoru Tozawa Koichiro Kuroda	N/A	February 9, 2009
525	2	"The Blue Spark of Hate (Part 2)"; Transliteration: "Nikushimi no Aoi Hibana (Kōhen)" (Japanese: 憎しみの青い火花（後編）)	Nobuharu Kamanaka	N/A	February 16, 2009
526	3	"A Present from the True Culprit"; Transliteration: "Shinhannin Kara no Todokemono" (Japanese: 真犯人からの届け物)	Masahisa Koyata	N/A	February 23, 2009
527	4	"The Malice Hidden Behind the Masque"; Transliteration: "Kamengeki ni Himeta Akui" (Japanese: 仮面劇に秘めた悪意)	Nobuharu Kamanaka	Hiro Masaki	March 2, 2009
528	5	"Might Over Mystery (Part 1)"; Transliteration: "Yawa Yoku Nazo o Seisu (Zenpen)" (Japanese: 柔よく謎を制す（前編）)	Koichiro Kuroda	N/A	March 9, 2009
529	6	"Might Over Mystery (Part 2)"; Transliteration: "Yawa Yoku Nazo o Seisu (Kōhen)" (Japanese: 柔よく謎を制す（後編）)	Minoru Tozawa	N/A	March 16, 2009
530	7	"The Truth Behind the Urban Legend (Part 1)"; Transliteration: "Toshi Densetsu No Shōtai (Zenpen)" (Japanese: 都市伝説の正体（前編）)	Nobuharu Kamanaka	N/A	April 18, 2009
531	8	"The Truth Behind the Urban Legend (Part 2)"; Transliteration: "Toshi Densetsu No Shōtai (Kōhen)" (Japanese: 都市伝説の正体（後編）)	Minoru Tozawa	N/A	April 25, 2009
532	9	"The Scar of First Love"; Transliteration: "Hatsukoi no Kizuato" (Japanese: 初恋の傷跡)	Masahisa Koyata	N/A	May 2, 2009
533	10	"The Scar that Invokes the Past"; Transliteration: "Kako o Yobu Kizuato" (Japanese: 過去を呼ぶ傷跡)	Koichiro Kuroda	N/A	May 9, 2009
534	11	"The New Scar and the Whistling Man"; Transliteration: "Arata na Kizuato to Kuchibue no Otoko" (Japanese: 新たな傷跡と口笛の男)	Nobuharu Kamanaka	N/A	May 16, 2009
535	12	"The Old Scar and the Inspector's Soul"; Transliteration: "Furuki Kizuato to Keiji no Tamashii" (Japanese: 古き傷跡と刑事の魂)	Minoru Tozawa	N/A	May 23, 2009
536	13	"The Secret of the Vanished Masterpiece"; Transliteration: "Kie ta Meiga no Himitsu" (Japanese: 消えた名画の秘密)	Shigeru Yamazaki	Nobuo Ogizawa	May 30, 2009
537	14	"Kaitō Kid vs the Strongest Vault (Part 1)"; Transliteration: "Kaitō Kiddo VS Saikyō Kinko (Zenpen)" (Japanese: 怪盗キッドVS最強金庫（前編）)	Masahisa Koyata	N/A	June 13, 2009
538	15	"Kaitō Kid vs the Strongest Vault (Part 2)"; Transliteration: "Kaitō Kiddo VS Saikyō Kinko (Kōhen)" (Japanese: 怪盗キッドVS最強金庫（後編）)	Nobuharu Kamanaka	N/A	June 20, 2009
539	16	"A Fool's Inheritance"; Transliteration: "Orokamono e no Isan" (Japanese: 愚か者への遺産)	Yasuichiro Yamamoto	Hiro Masaki	July 4, 2009
540	17	"The Day Kogoro Mori Ceased Being a Detective (Part 1)"; Transliteration: "Mōri Kogorō Tantei Haigyō no Hi (Zenpen)" (Japanese: 毛利小五郎探偵廃業の日（前編）)	Minoru Tozawa	Nobuo Ogizawa	July 11, 2009
541	18	"The Day Kogoro Mori Ceased Being a Detective (Part 2)"; Transliteration: "Mōri Kogorō Tantei Haigyō no Hi (Kōhen)" (Japanese: 毛利小五郎探偵廃業の日（後編）)	Koichiro Kuroda	Nobuo Ogizawa	July 18, 2009
542	19	"Ikkaku Rock's Disappearing Fish (Part 1)"; Transliteration: "Sakana ga Kieru Ikkaku Iwa (Zenpen)" (Japanese: 魚が消える一角岩（前編）)	Masahisa Koyata	N/A	July 25, 2009
543	20	"Ikkaku Rock's Disappearing Fish (Part 2)"; Transliteration: "Sakana ga Kieru Ikkaku Iwa (Kōhen)" (Japanese: 魚が消える一角岩（後編）)	Nobuharu Kamanaka	N/A	August 1, 2009
544	21	"The Hand That Plays in Dissonance"; Transliteration: "Fukyōwaon o Kanaderu Te" (Japanese: 不協和音を奏でる手)	Matsuo Asami	Toyoto Kogiso	August 8, 2009
545	22	"The Witch Enshrouded by Fog (Part 1)"; Transliteration: "Kiri ni Musebu Majo (Zenpen)" (Japanese: 霧にむせぶ魔女（前編）)	Minoru Tozawa	N/A	September 5, 2009
546	23	"The Witch Enshrouded by Fog (Part 2)"; Transliteration: "Kiri ni Musebu Majo (Kōhen)" (Japanese: 霧にむせぶ魔女（後編）)	Akira Yoshimura	N/A	September 12, 2009
547	24	"Two Days with the Culprit (First Day)"; Transliteration: "Hannin to no Futsukakan (Ichinichime)" (Japanese: 犯人との二日間（一日目）)	Nobuharu Kamanaka	Hiroshi Kashiwabara	September 19, 2009
548	25	"Two Days with the Culprit (Second Day)"; Transliteration: "Hannin to no Futsukakan (Futsukame)" (Japanese: 犯人との二日間（二日目）)	Koichiro Kuroda	Hiroshi Kashiwabara	September 26, 2009
549	26	"The Revolving Sushi Mystery (Part 1)"; Transliteration: "Kaiten Sushi Misuterii (Zenpen)" (Japanese: 回転寿司ミステリー（前編）)	Masakazu Yamazaki	N/A	October 3, 2009
550	27	"The Revolving Sushi Mystery (Part 2)"; Transliteration: "Kaiten Sushi Misuterii (Kōhen)" (Japanese: 回転寿司ミステリー（後編）)	Minoru Tozawa	N/A	October 10, 2009
551	28	"The Culprit is Genta's Dad (Part 1)"; Transliteration: "Hannin ha Genta no Touchan (Zenpen)" (Japanese: 犯人は元太の父ちゃん（前編）)	Aisu Mugino	N/A	October 17, 2009
552	29	"The Culprit is Genta's Dad (Part 2)"; Transliteration: "Hannin ha Genta no Touchan (Kōhen)" (Japanese: 犯人は元太の父ちゃん（後編）)	Akira Yoshimura	N/A	October 24, 2009
553	30	"The Interrogation Room"; Transliteration: "Za・Torishirabeshitsu" (Japanese: ザ・取調室)	Koichiro Kuroda	Junichi Miyashita	October 31, 2009
554	31	"Stork Mystery Tour (Ran's Search Chapter)"; Transliteration: "Kounotori Misuterii Tsuaa (Ran sōsaku hen)" (Japanese: こうのとりミステリーツアー（蘭捜索編）)	Naohiko Kyogoku	Junichi Miyashita	November 7, 2009
555	32	"Stork Mystery Tour (Haruna's Tracking Chapter)"; Transliteration: "KounotoriMisuterii Tsuaa (Haryouna Tsuiseki Hen)" (Japanese: こうのとりミステリーツアー（陽菜追跡編）)	Takeshi Furuta	Junichi Miyashita	November 14, 2009
556	33	"Intersection of Fear"; Transliteration: "Kyoufu no Kousaten" (Japanese: 恐怖の交差点)	Masakazu Yamazaki	Yu Kaneko	November 21, 2009
557	34	"A Dangerous Party of Two"; Transliteration: "Kiken na Futari Tsure" (Japanese: 危険な二人連れ)	Minoru Tozawa	N/A	November 28, 2009
558	35	"The Mansion of Death and the Red Wall (Three Visits)"; Transliteration: "Shibou no Yakata, Akai Kabe (Sankonorei)" (Japanese: 死亡の館、赤い壁 （三顧の礼）)	Nobuharu Kamanaka	N/A	December 5, 2009
559	36	"The Mansion of Death and the Red Wall (Item on Hand)"; Transliteration: "Shibou no Yakata, Akai Kabe (Shouchuu no Mono)" (Japanese: 死亡の館、赤い壁 （掌中の物）)	Aisu Mugino	N/A	December 12, 2009
560	37	"The Mansion of Death and the Red Wall (The Late Koumei)"; Transliteration: "Shibou no Yakata, Akai Kabe (Shiseru Koumei)" (Japanese: 死亡の館、赤い壁 （死せる孔明）)	Koichiro Kuroda	N/A	December 19, 2009
561	38	"The Mansion of Death and the Red Wall (Empty Fort Strategy)"; Transliteration: "Shibou no Yakata, Akai Kabe (Sorajou no Kei)" (Japanese: 死亡の館、赤い壁 （空城の計）)	Akira Yoshimura	N/A	December 26, 2009
562	39	"Rainbow Color Kidnapping"; Transliteration: "Reinbo Kara no Yuukai" (Japanese: 虹色の誘拐)	Masakazu Yamazaki	Junichi Miyashita	January 16, 2010
563	40	"Detective Boys vs. Robber Group (Turmoil)"; Transliteration: "Tanteidan VS Goutoudan (Souzen)" (Japanese: 探偵団VS強盗団 （騒然）)	Minoru Tozawa	N/A	January 23, 2010
564	41	"Detective Boys vs. Burglar Gang (Silence)"; Transliteration: "Tanteidan VS Goutoudan (Chinmoku)" (Japanese: 探偵団VS強盗団 （沈黙）)	Nobuharu Kamanaka	N/A	January 30, 2010
565	42	"The Eyewitness Who Did Not See"; Transliteration: "Mite nai Mokugekisha" (Japanese: 見てない目撃者)	Akio Kawamura	Masaki Tsuji	February 6, 2010

=== Season 19 (2010–11) ===
No.	No. in season	Title	Directed by	Written by	Original air date
566	1	"The Partner is Santa-san"; Transliteration: "Aibō wa Santa-san" (Japanese: 相棒はサンタさん)	Koichiro Kuroda	Takeo Ohno	February 27, 2010
567	2	"Murderous Intent Raining on an Outdoor Spa"; Transliteration: "Rotenburo ni Furu Satsui" (Japanese: 露天風呂に降る殺意)	Masakazu Yamazaki	Yu Kaneko	March 6, 2010
568	3	"Inspector Shiratori, Memories of the Cherry Blossom (Part 1)"; Transliteration: "Shiratori-keibu、Sakura no Omoide (Zenpen)" (Japanese: 白鳥警部、桜の思い出（前編）)	Minoru Tozawa	N/A	March 13, 2010
569	4	"Inspector Shiratori, Memories of the Cherry Blossom (Part 2)"; Transliteration: "Shiratori-keibu、Sakura no Omoide (Kōhen)" (Japanese: 白鳥警部、桜の思い出（後編）)	Nobuharu Kamanaka	N/A	March 20, 2010
570	5	"The Crime with Zero Possibility to be Proven"; Transliteration: "Risshō Kakuritsu Zero no Hanzai" (Japanese: 立証確率ゼロの犯罪)	Yoshitaka Nagaoka	Junichi Miyashita	March 27, 2010
571	6	"Battle of the Haunted Warehouse's Treasure (Part 1)"; Transliteration: "Mononoke Kura deo takara Batoru (Zenpen)" (Japanese: もののけ倉でお宝バトル（前編）)	Shigeru Yamazaki	N/A	May 1, 2010
572	7	"Battle of the Haunted Warehouse's Treasure (Part 2)"; Transliteration: "Mononoke Kura deo Takara Batoru (Kōhen)" (Japanese: もののけ倉でお宝バトル（後編）)	Masakazu Yamazaki	N/A	May 8, 2010
573	8	"The Whereabouts of the Embarrassing Charm (Part 1)"; Transliteration: "Hazukashii Omamori no Yukae (Zenpen)" (Japanese: 恥ずかしいお守りの行方（前編）)	Koichiro Kuroda	N/A	May 15, 2010
574	9	"The Whereabouts of the Embarrassing Charm (Part 2)"; Transliteration: "Hazukashii Omamori no Yukae (Kōhen)" (Japanese: 恥ずかしいお守りの行方（後編）)	Nobuharu Kamanaka	N/A	May 22, 2010
575	10	"The Alibi of the Black Dress (Part 1)"; Transliteration: "Kuroki Doresu no Aribai (Zenpen)" (Japanese: 黒きドレスのアリバイ（前編）)	Minoru Tozawa	N/A	May 29, 2010
576	11	"The Alibi of the Black Dress (Part 2)"; Transliteration: "Kuroki Doresu no Aribai (Kōhen)" (Japanese: 黒きドレスのアリバイ（後編）)	Shigeru Yamazaki	N/A	June 5, 2010
577	12	"The Truth Lit Up By the Fireflies"; Transliteration: "Hotaru ga Tomoshi ta Shinjitsu" (Japanese: ホタルが灯した真実)	Masakazu Yamazaki	Masaki Tsuji	June 19, 2010
578	13	"The Crisis Beckoned by the Red Omen"; Transliteration: "Kiki Yobu Akai Ōmen" (Japanese: 危機呼ぶ赤い前兆)	Akira Yoshimura	N/A	June 26, 2010
579	14	"The Suggestion of Black Thirteen"; Transliteration: "Kuroki Juu-san no Sajesuto" (Japanese: 黒き13の暗示)	Koichiro Kuroda	N/A	July 3, 2010
580	15	"The Black Time Limit Drawing Near"; Transliteration: "Semaru Kuro no Taimurimitto" (Japanese: 迫る黒の刻限)	Nobuharu Kamanaka	N/A	July 10, 2010
581	16	"The Red Shaking Target"; Transliteration: "Akaku Yureru Taagetto" (Japanese: 赤く揺れる照準)	Minoru Tozawa	N/A	July 17, 2010
582	17	"The Night the Zombie Died"; Transliteration: "Zonbi ga Shin da Yoru" (Japanese: ゾンビが死んだ夜)	Shigeru Yamazaki	Takeo Ohno	July 24, 2010
583	18	"Kobayashi-sensei's Love"; Transliteration: "Kobayashi-sensei no Koi" (Japanese: 小林先生の恋)	Masakazu Yamazaki	N/A	August 14, 2010
584	19	"Inspector Shiratori's Lost Love"; Transliteration: "Shiratori-keibu no Shitsuren" (Japanese: 白鳥警部の失恋)	Minoru Tozawa	N/A	August 21, 2010
585	20	"Timeless Sakura's Love"; Transliteration: "Toki wo Koeru Sakura no Koi" (Japanese: 時を超える桜の恋)	Yasuichiro Yamamoto	N/A	August 28, 2010
586	21	"The Kirin's Horn That Vanished into the Dark"; Transliteration: "Yami ni Kie ta Kirin no Tsuno" (Japanese: 闇に消えた麒麟の角)	Koichiro Kuroda	N/A	September 4, 2010
587	22	"Kid vs. the Four Divine Detective Boys"; Transliteration: "Kiddo vs Shijin Tantei Dan" (Japanese: キッドＶＳ四神探偵団)	Nobuharu Kamanaka	N/A	September 11, 2010
588	23	"The Trap of the Rooftop Farm"; Transliteration: "Okujou Nouen no Wana" (Japanese: 屋上農園の罠)	Shigeru Yamazaki	Junichi Iioka Yu Kaneko	September 18, 2010
589	24	"The Worst Birthday (Part 1)"; Transliteration: "Saiaku na Bāsudē (Zenpen)" (Japanese: 最悪な誕生日（前編）)	Yasuichiro Yamamoto	N/A	September 25, 2010
590	25	"The Worst Birthday (Part 2)"; Transliteration: "Saiaku na Bāsudē (Kōhen)" (Japanese: 最悪な誕生日（後編）)	Minoru Tozawa	N/A	October 2, 2010
591	26	"The House with the Aquarium"; Transliteration: "Suizokukan no aru Ie" (Japanese: 水族館のある家)	Masakazu Yamazaki Tomomi Ikeda	Suna Sunahara	October 16, 2010
592	27	"The Detective Memoir of Monkey and Rake (Part 1)"; Transliteration: "Saru to Kumade no tori Butsujou (Zenpen)" (Japanese: 猿と熊手のトリ物帖（前編）)	Koichiro Kuroda	N/A	October 23, 2010
593	28	"The Detective Memoir of Monkey and Rake (Part 2)"; Transliteration: "Saru to Kumade no tori Butsujou (Kōhen)" (Japanese: 猿と熊手のトリ物帖（後編）)	Shigeru Yamazaki	N/A	October 30, 2010
594	29	"The Seven Wonders of the Hiroshima Miyajima Tour (Miyajima Part)"; Transliteration: "Hiroshima Miyajima Nanafushigi tsuā (Miyajima hen)" (Japanese: 広島宮島七不思議ツアー（宮島編）)	Nobuharu Kamanaka	Junichi Miyashita	November 6, 2010
595	30	"The Seven Wonders of the Hiroshima Miyajima Tour (Hiroshima Part)"; Transliteration: "Hiroshima Miyajima Nanafushigi tsuā (Hiroshima hen)" (Japanese: 広島宮島七不思議ツアー（広島編）)	Minoru Tozawa	Junichi Miyashita	November 13, 2010
596	31	"The Alibi of the Fall"; Transliteration: "Tenraku no Aribai" (Japanese: 転落のアリバイ)	Masakazu Yamazaki Tomomi Ikeda	Chiko Uonji	November 20, 2010
597	32	"The Scenario of the Steaming Locked Room (Part 1)"; Transliteration: "Yukemuri Misshitsu no Shinario (Zenpen)" (Japanese: 湯煙密室のシナリオ（前編）)	Koichiro Kuroda	N/A	November 27, 2010
598	33	"The Scenario of the Steaming Locked Room (Part 2)"; Transliteration: "Yukemuri Misshitsu no Shinario (Kōhen)" (Japanese: 湯煙密室のシナリオ（後編）)	Akira Yoshimura	N/A	December 4, 2010
599	34	"A Friend of Justice"; Transliteration: "Seiginomikata" (Japanese: セイギノミカタ)	Minoru Tozawa	Junichi Miyashita	December 11, 2010
600	35	"The Dream the Kappa Saw (Part 1)"; Transliteration: "Kappa ga mi ta Yume (Zenpen)" (Japanese: 河童が見た夢（前編）)	Nobuharu Kamanaka	N/A	December 18, 2010
601	36	"The Dream the Kappa Saw (Part 2)"; Transliteration: "Kappa ga mi ta Yume (Kōhen)" (Japanese: 河童が見た夢（後編）)	Shigeru Yamazaki	N/A	December 25, 2010
602	37	"The Devil Hidden in the Tennis Court"; Transliteration: "Tenisu Kōto ni Hisomu Akuma" (Japanese: テニスコートに潜む悪魔)	Tomomi Ikeda Masakazu Yamazaki	Yu Kaneko	January 8, 2011
603	38	"The Séance's Double Locked Room Mystery Case (First Locked Room)"; Transliteration: "Kourei Kai Daburu Misshitsu Jiken (Daiichi no Misshitsu)" (Japanese: 降霊会Ｗ(ダブル)密室事件（第一の密室）)	Shigenori Kageyama	Chiko Uonji	January 29, 2011
604	39	"The Séance's Double Locked Room Mystery Case (Second Locked Room)"; Transliteration: "Kourei Kai Daburu Misshitsu Jiken (Daini no Misshitsu)" (Japanese: 降霊会Ｗ(ダブル)密室事件（第二の密室）)	Masaharu Okuwaki	Chiko Uonji	February 5, 2011
605	40	"The Séance's Double Locked Room Mystery Case (Opened Locked Room)"; Transliteration: "Kourei Kai Daburu Misshitsu Jiken (Misshitsu Kaihou)" (Japanese: 降霊会Ｗ(ダブル)密室事件（密室開放）)	Shigenori Kageyama	Chiko Uonji	February 12, 2011

=== Season 20 (2011–12) ===
No.	No. in season	Title	Directed by	Written by	Original air date
606	1	"Courtroom Confrontation IV: Juror Sumiko Kobayashi (Part 1)"; Transliteration: "Houtei no Taiketsu IV Saibanin Kobayashi Sumiko (Zenpen)" (Japanese: 法廷の対決IV裁判員小林澄子（前編）)	Shigeru Yamazaki	Yutaka Kaneko	February 19, 2011
607	2	"Courtroom Confrontation IV: Juror Sumiko Kobayashi (Part 2)"; Transliteration: "Houtei no Taiketsu IV Saibanin Kobayashi Sumiko (Kōhen)" (Japanese: 法廷の対決IV裁判員小林澄子（後編）)	Akira Yoshimura	Yutaka Kaneko	February 26, 2011
608	3	"White Day of Betrayal (Part 1)"; Transliteration: "Uragiri no Howaito Dē (Zenpen)" (Japanese: 裏切りのホワイトデー（前編）)	Tomomi Ikeda	N/A	March 5, 2011
609	4	"White Day of Betrayal (Part 2)"; Transliteration: "Uragiri no Howaito Dē (Kōhen)" (Japanese: 裏切りのホワイトデー（後編）)	Minoru Tozawa	N/A	March 19, 2011
610	5	"The Victim is Shinichi Kudo"; Transliteration: "Higaisha wa Kudō Shinichi" (Japanese: 被害者はクドウシンイチ)	Koichiro Kuroda	N/A	April 9, 2011
611	6	"Inubushi Castle, The Flame of the Demon Dog (Will-o'-The-Wisp Chapter)"; Transliteration: "Inubushi Jou En no Mainu (Onibi no Akira)" (Japanese: 犬伏城 炎の魔犬（鬼火の章）)	Shigeru Yamazaki	N/A	April 16, 2011
612	7	"Inubushi Castle, The Flame of the Demon Dog (Footsteps Chapter)"; Transliteration: "Inubushi Jou En no Mainu (Ashiato no Akira)" (Japanese: 犬伏城 炎の魔犬（足跡の章）)	Nobuharu Kamanaka	N/A	April 23, 2011
613	8	"Inubushi Castle, The Flame of the Demon Dog (Chapter of Princess)"; Transliteration: "Inubushi Jou En no Mainu (Hime no Akira)" (Japanese: 犬伏城 炎の魔犬（姫の章）)	Tomomi Ikeda	N/A	April 30, 2011
614	9	"The Secret Played by the Diary (Part 1)"; Transliteration: "Nikki ga Kanaderu Himitsu (Zenpen)" (Japanese: 日記が奏でる秘密（前編）)	Akira Yoshimura	N/A	May 7, 2011
615	10	"The Secret Played by the Diary (Part 2)"; Transliteration: "Nikki ga Kanaderu Himitsu (Kōhen)" (Japanese: 日記が奏でる秘密（後編）)	Koichiro Kuroda	N/A	May 14, 2011
616	11	"Holmes' Revelation (Holmes' Apprentice)"; Transliteration: "Hōmuzu no Mokushiroku (Hōmuzu no Deshi)" (Japanese: ホームズの黙示録（名探偵の弟子）)	Minoru Tozawa	N/A	May 21, 2011
617	12	"Holmes' Revelation (Love is 0)"; Transliteration: "Hōmuzu no Mokushiroku (Love is 0)" (Japanese: ホームズの黙示録（Love is 0）)	Shigeru Yamazaki	N/A	May 28, 2011
618	13	"Holmes' Revelation (Satan)"; Transliteration: "Hōmuzu no Mokushiroku (Satan)" (Japanese: ホームズの黙示録（サタン）)	Nobuharu Kamanaka	N/A	June 4, 2011
619	14	"Holmes' Revelation (Code Break)"; Transliteration: "Hōmuzu no Mokushiroku （Code Break）" (Japanese: ホームズの黙示録（Code Break）)	Tomomi Ikeda	N/A	June 11, 2011
620	15	"Holmes' Revelation (Grass Court Queen)"; Transliteration: "Hōmuzu no Mokushiroku (Gurasukōtokuīn)" (Japanese: ホームズの黙示録（芝の女王）)	Koichiro Kuroda	N/A	June 18, 2011
621	16	"Holmes' Revelation (0 is Start)"; Transliteration: "Hōmuzu no Mokushiroku (Zero is Start)" (Japanese: ホームズの黙示録（0 is Start）)	Akira Yoshimura	N/A	June 25, 2011
622	17	"Emergency Situation 252 (Part 1)"; Transliteration: "Kinkyū Jitai 252 (Zenpen)" (Japanese: 緊急事態252（前編）)	Minoru Tozawa	N/A	July 2, 2011
623	18	"Emergency Situation 252 (Part 2)"; Transliteration: "Kinkyū Jitai 252 (Kōhen)" (Japanese: 緊急事態252（後編）)	Shigeru Yamazaki	N/A	July 9, 2011
624	19	"A Video Letter of First Love"; Transliteration: "Hatsukoi no Bideoretā" (Japanese: 初恋のビデオレター)	Nobuharu Kamanaka	N/A	July 16, 2011
625	20	"The Screaming Operation Room(Part 1)"; Transliteration: "Zekkyō Operūmu (Zenpen)" (Japanese: 絶叫手術室（前編）)	Tomomi Ikeda	N/A	July 23, 2011
626	21	"The Screaming Operation Room (Part 2)"; Transliteration: "Zekkyō Operūmu (Kōhen)" (Japanese: 絶叫手術室（後編）)	Koichiro Kuroda	N/A	July 30, 2011
627	22	"Conan & Kid's Battle For Ryoma's Treasure (Part 1)"; Transliteration: "Conan Kiddo no Ryōma Otakara Kōbō-sen (Zenpen)" (Japanese: コナンキッドの龍馬お宝攻防戦（前編）)	Minoru Tozawa	N/A	August 20, 2011
628	23	"Conan & Kid's Battle For Ryoma's Treasure (Part 2)"; Transliteration: "Conan Kiddo no Ryōma Otakara Kōbō-sen (Kōhen)" (Japanese: コナンキッドの龍馬お宝攻防戦（後編）)	Yasuichiro Yamamoto	N/A	August 27, 2011
629	24	"The Promo Video Shooting Case (Part 1)"; Transliteration: "Puromobideo Satsuei Jiken (Zenpen)" (Japanese: プロモビデオ撮影事件（前編）)	Shigeru Yamazaki	Atsushi Maekawa	September 3, 2011
630	25	"The Promo Video Shooting Case (Part 2)"; Transliteration: "Puromobideo Satsuei Jiken (Kōhen)" (Japanese: プロモビデオ撮影事件（後編）)	Akira Yoshimura	Atsushi Maekawa	September 10, 2011
631	26	"What the Flower Clock Knew"; Transliteration: "Hana Tokei wa Shitte Ita" (Japanese: 花時計は知っていた)	Tomomi Ikeda	Masaki Tsuji	September 17, 2011
632	27	"The Guardian of Time's Sword (Part 1)"; Transliteration: "Toki no Bannin no Yaiba (Zenpen)" (Japanese: 時の番人の刃（前編）)	Minoru Tozawa	N/A	October 1, 2011
633	28	"The Guardian of Time's Sword (Part 2)"; Transliteration: "Toki no Bannin no Yaiba (Kōhen)" (Japanese: 時の番人の刃（後編）)	Koichiro Kuroda	N/A	October 8, 2011
634	29	"The Super Narrow Shop Crime Scene"; Transliteration: "Hankou Genba wa Geki Sema Ten" (Japanese: 犯行現場は激セマ店)	Nobuharu Kamanaka	Junichi Iioka Yu Kaneko	October 15, 2011
635	30	"Beware of Dieting"; Transliteration: "Daietto ni Goyoujin" (Japanese: ダイエットにご用心)	Akira Yoshimura	Tomoka Yamada	November 5, 2011
636	31	"The Most Useful School in the World Case (Part 1)"; Transliteration: "Sekaiichi Uketai Jugyō Jiken (Zenpen)" (Japanese: 世界一受けたい授業事件（前編）)	Shigeru Yamazaki	Shigenori Kageyama	November 12, 2011
637	32	"The Most Useful School in the World Case (Part 2)"; Transliteration: "Sekaiichi Uketai Jugyō Jiken (Kōhen)" (Japanese: 世界一受けたい授業事件（後編）)	Koichiro Kuroda	Shigenori Kageyama	November 19, 2011
638	33	"Solving Mysteries at the Red Leaf Palace (Part 1)"; Transliteration: "Momiji Goten de Nazo o Toku (Zenpen)" (Japanese: 紅葉御殿で謎を解く（前編）)	Makoto Fuchigami	Masaki Tsuji	November 26, 2011
639	34	"Solving Mysteries at the Red Leaf Palace (Part 2)"; Transliteration: "Momiji Goten de Nazo o Toku (Kōhen)" (Japanese: 紅葉御殿で謎を解く（後編）)	Tomomi Ikeda	Masaki Tsuji	December 3, 2011
640	35	"The Memory Trip of the Eight Sketches (Okayama Part)"; Transliteration: "Hachimai no Sukecchi Kioku no Tabi (Okayama hen)" (Japanese: 8枚のスケッチ記憶の旅（岡山編）)	Minoru Tozawa	Junichi Miyashita	December 10, 2011
641	36	"The Memory Trip of the Eight Sketches (Kurashiki Part)"; Transliteration: "Hachimai no Sukecchi Kioku no Tabi (Kurashiki hen)" (Japanese: 8枚のスケッチ記憶の旅（倉敷編）)	Nobuharu Kamanaka	Junichi Miyashita	December 17, 2011
642	37	"Grabbing Karuta Cards in Dire Straits (Part 1)"; Transliteration: "Karuta-tori Kikiippatsu (Zenpen)" (Japanese: カルタ取り危機一髪（前編）)	Shigeru Yamazaki	N/A	January 7, 2012
643	38	"Grabbing Karuta Cards in Dire Straits (Part 2)"; Transliteration: "Karuta-tori Kikiippatsu (Kōhen)" (Japanese: カルタ取り危機一髪（後編）)	Koichiro Kuroda	N/A	January 14, 2012
644	39	"Ramen So Good, It's to Die For (Part 1)"; Transliteration: "Shinu Hodo Umai Rāmen (Zenpen)" (Japanese: 死ぬほど美味しいラーメン（前編）)	Minoru Tozawa	N/A	February 4, 2012
645	40	"Ramen So Good, It's to Die For (Part 2)"; Transliteration: "Shinu Hodo Umai Rāmen (Kōhen)" (Japanese: 死ぬほど美味しいラーメン（後編）)	Tomomi Ikeda	N/A	February 11, 2012

=== Season 21 (2012) ===
No.	No. in season	Title	Directed by	Written by	Original air date
646	1	"The Deduction Showdown at the Haunted Hotel (Part 1)"; Transliteration: "Yūrei Hoteru no Suiri Taiketsu (Zenpen)" (Japanese: 幽霊ホテルの推理対決（前編）)	Akira Yoshimura	N/A	February 18, 2012
647	2	"The Deduction Showdown at the Haunted Hotel (Part 2)"; Transliteration: "Yūrei Hoteru no Suiri Taiketsu (Kōhen)" (Japanese: 幽霊ホテルの推理対決（後編）)	Shigeru Yamazaki	N/A	February 25, 2012
648	3	"The Case of the Besieged Detective Agency (Outbreak)"; Transliteration: "Tantei Jimusho Rōjō Jiken (Boppatsu)" (Japanese: 探偵事務所籠城事件（勃発）)	Koichiro Kuroda	N/A	March 3, 2012
649	4	"The Case of the Besieged Detective Agency (Sniping)"; Transliteration: "Tantei Jimusho Rōjō Jiken (Sogeki)" (Japanese: 探偵事務所籠城事件（狙撃）)	Minoru Tozawa	N/A	March 10, 2012
650	5	"The Case of the Besieged Detective Agency (Release)"; Transliteration: "Tantei Jimusho Rōjō Jiken (Kaihō)" (Japanese: 探偵事務所籠城事件（解放）)	Tomomi Ikeda	N/A	March 17, 2012
651	6	"Conan vs. Heiji: Deduction Battle Between the Detectives of the East and West^{1 hr.}" Transliteration: "Conan vs Heiji Tōzai Tantei Suiri Shōbu" (Japanese: コナンvs平次 東西探偵推理勝負)	Akira Yoshimura Shigeru Yamazaki	N/A	March 24, 2012 (Note: The episodes were aired as a single hour long episode in Japan.)
652	7	"The Design of Poison and Mirage (Eye)"; Transliteration: "Doku to Maboroshi no Dezain (Eye)" (Japanese: 毒と幻のデザイン(Eye))	Koichiro Kuroda	N/A	April 21, 2012
653	8	"The Design of Poison and Mirage (S)"; Transliteration: "Doku to Maboroshi no Dezain (S)" (Japanese: 毒と幻のデザイン(S))	Minoru Tozawa	N/A	April 28, 2012
654	9	"The Design of Poison and Mirage (Poison)"; Transliteration: "Doku to Maboroshi no Dezain (Poison)" (Japanese: 毒と幻のデザイン(Poison))	Tomomi Ikeda	N/A	May 5, 2012
655	10	"The Design of Poison and Mirage (Illusion)"; Transliteration: "Doku to Maboroshi no Dezain (Illusion)" (Japanese: 毒と幻のデザイン(Illusion))	Akira Yoshimura	N/A	May 12, 2012
656	11	"The Professor's Video Site (Part 1)"; Transliteration: "Hakase no Douga Saito (Zenpen)" (Japanese: 博士の動画サイト（前編）)	Shigeru Yamazaki	N/A	May 19, 2012
657	12	"The Professor's Video Site (Part 2)"; Transliteration: "Hakase no Douga Saito (Kōhen)" (Japanese: 博士の動画サイト（後編）)	Koichiro Kuroda	N/A	May 26, 2012
658	13	"The Hot Chocolate Trap"; Transliteration: "Shokora no Atsui Wana" (Japanese: ショコラの熱い罠)	Minoru Tozawa	Yasutoshi Murakawa	June 2, 2012
659	14	"Co-Investigating with a First Love (Part 1)"; Transliteration: "Hatsukoi no Kyōdō Sōsa (Zenpen)" (Japanese: 初恋の共同捜査（前編）)	Akira Yoshimura	N/A	June 9, 2012
660	15	"Co-Investigating with a First Love (Part 2)"; Transliteration: "Hatsukoi no Kyōdō Sōsa (Kōhen)" (Japanese: 初恋の共同捜査（後編）)	Shigeru Yamazaki	N/A	June 16, 2012
661	16	"Kogoro-san is a Good Man (Part 1)"; Transliteration: "Kogorō-san wa Ii Hito (Zenpen)" (Japanese: 小五郎さんはいい人（前編）)	Koichiro Kuroda	N/A	June 23, 2012
662	17	"Kogoro-san is a Good Man (Part 2)"; Transliteration: "Kogorō-san wa Ii Hito (Kōhen)" (Japanese: 小五郎さんはいい人（後編）)	Minoru Tozawa	N/A	June 30, 2012
663	18	"Chase the Miyama Stag Beetle"; Transliteration: "Miyamakuwagata o Oe" (Japanese: ミヤマクワガタを追え)	Shirabe Kobayashi	Toyoto Kogiso	July 7, 2012
664	19	"The Great Dog Coeur's Triumph 2"; Transliteration: "Meiken Kūru no o Tegara 2" (Japanese: 名犬クールのお手柄2)	Akira Yoshimura	Kazunari Kochi	July 14, 2012
665	20	"The Suspicious Initial K"; Transliteration: "Giwaku no Inisharu K" (Japanese: 疑惑のイニシャルK)	Shigeru Yamazaki	Chiko Uonji	July 21, 2012
666	21	"The Rainy Night Menace"; Transliteration: "Ame no Yoru no Kyōhaku-sha" (Japanese: 雨の夜の脅迫者)	Minoru Tozawa	Junichi Miyashita	July 28, 2012
667	22	"Wedding Eve (Part 1)"; Transliteration: "Uedingu Ivu (Zenpen)" (Japanese: ウエディング・イヴ （前編）)	Yasuichiro Yamamoto	N/A	September 1, 2012
668	23	"Wedding Eve (Part 2)"; Transliteration: "Uedingu Ivu (Kōhen)" (Japanese: ウエディング・イヴ （後編）)	Koichiro Kuroda	N/A	September 8, 2012
669	24	"The Dark Tower's Hidden Treasure (Part 1)"; Transliteration: "Kurayami Tō no Hihō (Zenpen)" (Japanese: くらやみ塔の秘宝 （前編）)	Minoru Tozawa	Masaki Tsuji	September 15, 2012
670	25	"The Dark Tower's Hidden Treasure (Part 2)"; Transliteration: "Kurayami Tō no Hihō (Kōhen)" (Japanese: くらやみ塔の秘宝 （後編）)	Koichiro Kuroda Yasuro Tsuchiya	Masaki Tsuji	September 22, 2012
671	26	"Detectives' Nocturne (The Case)"; Transliteration: "Tantei-tachi no Yasōkyoku (Jiken)" (Japanese: 探偵たちの夜想曲（事件）)	Akira Yoshimura	N/A	October 6, 2012
672	27	"Detectives' Nocturne (Kidnapping)"; Transliteration: "Tantei-tachi no Yasōkyoku (Yūkan)" (Japanese: 探偵たちの夜想曲（誘拐）)	Shigeru Yamazaki	N/A	October 13, 2012
673	28	"Detectives' Nocturne (Deduction)"; Transliteration: "Tantei-tachi no Yasōkyoku (Suiri)" (Japanese: 探偵たちの夜想曲（推理）)	Nobuharu Kamanaka	N/A	October 20, 2012
674	29	"Detectives' Nocturne (Bourbon)"; Transliteration: "Tantei-tachi no Yasōkyoku (Bābon)" (Japanese: 探偵たちの夜想曲（バーボン）)	Minoru Tozawa	N/A	October 27, 2012
675	30	"Won't Forgive Even One Millimeter (Part 1)"; Transliteration: "1 Miri mo Yurusanai (Zenpen)" (Japanese: 1ミリも許さない （前編）)	Akira Yoshimura	N/A	November 10, 2012
676	31	"Won't Forgive Even One Millimeter (Part 2)"; Transliteration: "1 Miri mo Yurusanai (Kōhen)" (Japanese: 1ミリも許さない （後編）)	Koichiro Kuroda	N/A	November 17, 2012
677	32	"The Footprintless Beach"; Transliteration: "Ashiato ga Nai Sunahama" (Japanese: 足跡がない砂浜)	Shigeru Yamazaki	Takeo Ohno	November 24, 2012
678	33	"Nagasaki Mystery Theater (Bakumatsu Part)"; Transliteration: "Nagasaki Misuterī Gekijō (Bakumatsu-hen)" (Japanese: 長崎ミステリー劇場（幕末篇）)	Nobuharu Kamanaka	Junichi Miyashita	December 1, 2012
679	34	"Nagasaki Mystery Theater (Present-Day Part)"; Transliteration: "Nagasaki Misuterī Gekijō (Gendai-hen)" (Japanese: 長崎ミステリー劇場（現代篇）)	Minoru Tozawa	Junichi Miyashita	December 8, 2012
680	35	"Cactus Capriccio"; Transliteration: "Saboten Kyou Sou Kyoku" (Japanese: サボテン狂騒曲)	Koichiro Kuroda	Yasutoshi Murakawa	December 15, 2012

=== Season 22 (2013) ===
No.	No. in season	Title	Directed by	Written by	Original air date
681	1	"The Life-Threatening Broadcast of Love (Begin Broadcasting)"; Transliteration: "Inochi wo Kaketa Ren'ai Chuukei (Chuukei Kaishi)" (Japanese: 命を賭けた恋愛中継（中継開始）)	Akira Yoshimura	N/A	January 5, 2013
682	2	"The Life-Threatening Broadcast of Love (Desperate Situation)"; Transliteration: "Inochi wo Kaketa Ren'ai Chuukei (Zettai Zetsumei)" (Japanese: 命を賭けた恋愛中継（絶体絶命）)	Shigeru Yamazaki	N/A	January 12, 2013
683	3	"The Life-Threatening Broadcast of Love (Enter the Scene)"; Transliteration: "Inochi wo Kaketa Ren'ai Chuukei (Genba Totsunyū)" (Japanese: 命を賭けた恋愛中継（現場突入）)	Nobuharu Kamanaka	N/A	January 19, 2013
684	4	"Froth, Steam, and Smoke (Part 1)"; Transliteration: "Awa to Yuge to Kemuri (Zenpen)" (Japanese: 泡と湯気と煙（前編）)	Minoru Tozawa	N/A	January 26, 2013
685	5	"Froth, Steam, and Smoke (Part 2)"; Transliteration: "Awa to Yuge to Kemuri (Kōhen)" (Japanese: 泡と湯気と煙（後編）)	Koichiro Kuroda	N/A	February 2, 2013
686	6	"A Car Carrying A Time Bomb"; Transliteration: "Jigen Bakudan o Noseta Kuruma" (Japanese: 時限爆弾を乗せた車)	Akira Yoshimura	Junichi Miyashita	February 9, 2013
687	7	"The Unsolvable Ice Trap"; Transliteration: "Dare mo tokenai Kōri no Wana" (Japanese: 誰もとけない氷の罠)	Shigeru Yamazaki	Asami Ishikawa	February 16, 2013
688	8	"Detective Takagi Finds 30 Million Yen"; Transliteration: "Takagi-keiji 3000 Man-en Hirou" (Japanese: 高木刑事3000万円拾う)	Nobuharu Kamanaka	Nobuo Ogizawa	February 23, 2013
689	9	"The Client's Message"; Transliteration: "Iraijin Kara no Messēji" (Japanese: 依頼人からのメッセージ)	Minoru Tozawa	Atsushi Maekawa	March 2, 2013
690	10	"Yusaku Kudo's Cold Case (Part 1)"; Transliteration: "Kudō Yūsaku no Mikaiketsujiken (Zenpen)" (Japanese: 工藤優作の未解決事件（前編）)	Koichiro Kuroda	N/A	March 9, 2013
691	11	"Yusaku Kudo's Cold Case (Part 2)"; Transliteration: "Kudō Yūsaku no Mikaiketsujiken (Kōhen)" (Japanese: 工藤優作の未解決事件（後編）)	Akira Yoshimura	N/A	March 16, 2013
692	12	"The Evening Cherry Blossom Viewing Route on Sumida River (Part 1)"; Transliteration: "Sumidagawa Yozakura Rūto (Zenpen)" (Japanese: 隅田川夜桜ルート（前編）)	Nobuharu Kamanaka	Hiroshi Kashiwabara	March 23, 2013
693	13	"The Evening Cherry Blossom Viewing Route on Sumida River (Part 2)"; Transliteration: "Sumidagawa Yozakura Rūto (Kōhen)" (Japanese: 隅田川夜桜ルート（後編）)	Shinji Ushiro Takanori Yano	Hiroshi Kashiwabara	March 30, 2013
694	14	"The Missing Sweets in the Old Shop"; Transliteration: "Kieta Shinise no Wagashi" (Japanese: 消えた老舗の和菓子)	Minoru Tozawa	Takeharu Sakurai	April 20, 2013
695	15	"The Roses in the Vineyard"; Transliteration: "Budō Hata ni Bara no Hana" (Japanese: 葡萄畑に薔薇の花)	Koichiro Kuroda	Tatsumi Kakihara	April 27, 2013
696	16	"The Flowerbed Vandal's Scheme"; Transliteration: "Kadan Arashi no Inbō" (Japanese: 花壇あらしの陰謀)	Akira Yoshimura	Yu Kaneko	May 4, 2013
697	17	"The Window at the Girls' School"; Transliteration: "Onna Gakuen no Mado" (Japanese: 女学園の窓)	Masanori Hashimoto	Masaki Tsuji	May 11, 2013
698	18	"Unbelievable! The Case of the Crashed UFO"; Transliteration: "Masaka! Yūfō Tsuiraku Jiken" (Japanese: まさか! UFO墜落事件)	Nobuharu Kamanaka	Nobuo Ogizawa	May 18, 2013
699	19	"The Shadow Approaching Haibara's Secret (Part 1)"; Transliteration: "Haibara no himitsu ni semaru kage (Zenpen)" (Japanese: 灰原の秘密に迫る影（前編）)	Minoru Tozawa	N/A	June 8, 2013
700	20	"The Shadow Approaching Haibara's Secret (Part 2)"; Transliteration: "Haibara no himitsu ni semaru kage (Kōhen)" (Japanese: 灰原の秘密に迫る影（後編）)	Koichiro Kuroda	N/A	June 15, 2013
701	21	"The Jet-Black Mystery Train (Departure)"; Transliteration: "Shikkoku no Misuterītorein (Hassha)" (Japanese: 漆黒の特急（発車）)	Akira Yoshimura	N/A	July 13, 2013
702	22	"The Jet-Black Mystery Train (Tunnel)"; Transliteration: "Shikkoku no Misuterītorein (Zuidō)" (Japanese: 漆黒の特急（隧道）)	Takanori Yano	N/A	July 20, 2013
703	23	"The Jet-Black Mystery Train (Intersection)"; Transliteration: "Shikkoku no Misuterītorein (Kōsa)" (Japanese: 漆黒の特急（交差）)	Tomomi Ikeda	N/A	July 27, 2013
704	24	"The Jet-Black Mystery Train (Final Destination)"; Transliteration: "Shikkoku no Misuterītorein (Shūten)" (Japanese: 漆黒の特急（終点）)	Yasuichiro Yamamoto	N/A	August 3, 2013
705	25	"Conan Inside a Locked Room"; Transliteration: "Misshitsu ni Iru Conan" (Japanese: 密室にいるコナン)	Koichiro Kuroda	N/A	August 10, 2013
706	26	"Bourbon Figures It Out"; Transliteration: "Nazotoki Suru Bābon" (Japanese: 謎解きするバーボン)	Minoru Tozawa	N/A	August 17, 2013
707	27	"The Framed Great Detective"; Transliteration: "Hamerareta Meitantei" (Japanese: はめられた名探偵)	Akira Yoshimura	Junichi Miyashita	August 31, 2013
708	28	"The Man Who Fell Slowly"; Transliteration: "Yukkuri Ochita Otoko" (Japanese: ゆっくり落ちた男)	Takanori Yano	Junichi Iioka Yusuke Takeda Nobuo Ogizawa	September 7, 2013
709	29	"An Unconfirmed Shocking Case"; Transliteration: "Mi Kakunin Shōgeki Jiken" (Japanese: 未確認衝撃事件)	Nobuharu Kamanaka	Yasutoshi Murakawa	September 14, 2013
710	30	"Everyone Saw (Part 1)"; Transliteration: "Min'na ga Mite Ita (Zenpen)" (Japanese: みんなが見ていた（前編）)	Koichiro Kuroda	N/A	September 21, 2013
711	31	"Everyone Saw (Part 2)"; Transliteration: "Min'na ga Mite Ita (Kōhen)" (Japanese: みんなが見ていた（後編）)	Minoru Tozawa	N/A	September 28, 2013
712	32	"Heiji Hattori and the Vampire Mansion (Part 1)"; Transliteration: "Hattori Heiji to Kyūketsuki Yakata (Ichi)" (Japanese: 服部平次と吸血鬼館（一）)	Masahisa Koyata	N/A	October 5, 2013
713	33	"Heiji Hattori and the Vampire Mansion (Part 2)"; Transliteration: "Hattori Heiji to Kyūketsuki Yakata (Ni)" (Japanese: 服部平次と吸血鬼館（二）)	Akira Yoshimura	N/A	October 12, 2013
714	34	"Heiji Hattori and the Vampire Mansion (Part 3)"; Transliteration: "Hattori Heiji to Kyūketsuki Yakata (San)" (Japanese: 服部平次と吸血鬼館（三）)	Takanori Yano	N/A	October 19, 2013
715	35	"Heiji Hattori and the Vampire Mansion (Part 4)"; Transliteration: "Hattori Heiji to Kyūketsuki Yakata (Yon)" (Japanese: 服部平次と吸血鬼館（四）)	Nobuharu Kamanaka	N/A	October 26, 2013
716	36	"Dancing Demon at the Noh Mask Mansion (Part 1)"; Transliteration: "Nōmen yashiki ni oni ga odoru (zenpen)" (Japanese: 能面屋敷に鬼が踊る（前編）)	Koichiro Kuroda	Masaki Tsuji	November 2, 2013
717	37	"Dancing Demon at the Noh Mask Mansion (Part 2)"; Transliteration: "Nōmen yashiki ni oni ga odoru (kōhen)" (Japanese: 能面屋敷に鬼が踊る（後編）)	Minoru Tozawa	Masaki Tsuji	November 9, 2013
718	38	"The Devil's Circuit"; Transliteration: "Akuma no Kairo" (Japanese: 悪魔の回路)	Kenichi Takeshita	Nobuo Ogizawa	November 16, 2013

=== Season 23 (2013–14) ===
No.	No. in season	Title	Directed by	Written by	Original air date
719	1	"A Dispute Over a Platinum Ticket"; Transliteration: "Purachina Chiketto Sōdō-ki" (Japanese: プラチナチケット騒動記)	Akira Yoshimura	Yukiko Okazaki	November 23, 2013
720	2	"Fire and Water Mystery Tour (Aso Part)"; Transliteration: "Hi to Mizu no Misuterītsuā (Asopen)" (Japanese: 火と水のミステリーツアー（阿蘇編）)	Takanori Yano	Atsushi Maekawa	November 30, 2013
721	3	"Fire and Water Mystery Tour (Kumamoto Part)"; Transliteration: "Hi to Mizu no Misuterītsuā (Kumamotohen)" (Japanese: 火と水のミステリーツアー（熊本編）)	Nobuharu Kamanaka	Atsushi Maekawa	December 7, 2013
722	4	"Sweet and Cold Delivery Service (Part 1)"; Transliteration: "Amaku Tsumetai Takkyūbin (Zenpen)" (Japanese: 甘く冷たい宅急便（前編）)	Koichiro Kuroda	N/A	December 14, 2013
723	5	"Sweet and Cold Delivery Service (Part 2)"; Transliteration: "Amaku tsumetai takkyūbin (Kōhen)" (Japanese: 甘く冷たい宅急便（後編）)	Minoru Tozawa	N/A	December 21, 2013
724	6	"Kaitou Kid and the Blush Mermaid (Part 1)"; Transliteration: "Kaito kiddo to sekimen no ningyo (Zenpen)" (Japanese: 怪盗キッドと赤面の人魚（前編）)	Taichi Atarashi	N/A	January 4, 2014
725	7	"Kaitou Kid and the Blush Mermaid (Part 2)"; Transliteration: "Kaito kiddo to sekimen no ningyo (Kōhen)" (Japanese: 怪盗キッドと赤面の人魚（後編）)	Akira Yoshimura	N/A	January 11, 2014
726	8	"A Happy E-mail Brings Sadness"; Transliteration: "Shiawase Mail wa Fukō o Yobu" (Japanese: 幸福メールは不幸を呼ぶ)	Takanori Yano	Tatsuro Inamoto	January 18, 2014
727	9	"The Treasure Chest Filled With Fruits (Part 1)"; Transliteration: "Kajitsuka Tsumatta Takarabako (Zenpen)" (Japanese: 果実か詰まった宝箱（前編）)	Nobuharu Kamanaka	N/A	January 25, 2014
728	10	"The Treasure Chest Filled With Fruits (Part 2)"; Transliteration: "Kajitsuka Tsumatta Takarabako (Kōhen)" (Japanese: 果実か詰まった宝箱（後編）)	Koichiro Kuroda	N/A	February 1, 2014
729	11	"The Diamond, the Painting, and the Great Actress"; Transliteration: "Daiya to Kaiga to Dai Joyū" (Japanese: ダイヤと絵画と大女優)	Minoru Tozawa	Tatsumi Kakihara	February 8, 2014
730	12	"The Figure That Was Too Good"; Transliteration: "Kanpeki Sugita Figyua" (Japanese: 完璧すぎたフィギュア)	Akira Yoshimura	Koshiro Mikami	February 22, 2014
731	13	"The Ex-Boyfriend Living Next to a Crime Scene (Part 1)"; Transliteration: "Genba no Rinjin wa Moto Kare (Zenpen)" (Japanese: 現場の隣人は元カレ（前編）)	Takanori Yano	N/A	March 1, 2014
732	14	"The Ex-Boyfriend Living Next to a Crime Scene (Part 2)"; Transliteration: "Genba no Rinjin wa Moto Kare (Kōhen)" (Japanese: 現場の隣人は元カレ（後編）)	Taichi Atarashi	N/A	March 8, 2014
733	15	"The Wedding Reception and the Two Gunshots"; Transliteration: "Hirōen to Futatsu no Jūsei" (Japanese: 披露宴と二つの銃声)	Koichiro Kuroda	Toyoto Kogiso	March 22, 2014
734	16	"Jodie's Memories and the Cherry Blossom Viewing Trap^{1 hr.}" Transliteration: "Jodie no Tsuioku to Ohanami no Wana" (Japanese: ジョディの追憶とお花見の罠)	Minoru Tozawa Akira Yoshimura	N/A	March 29, 2014
735	17	"The Coded Invitation"; Transliteration: "Angō-tsuki no Jōtaijō" (Japanese: 暗号付きの招待状)	Takanori Yano	Kazunari Kouchi	April 19, 2014
736	18	"The Secret of the Statue of Kogoro Mouri"; Transliteration: "Mōri Kogorō-zō no Himitsu" (Japanese: 毛利小五郎像の秘密)	Minoru Tozawa	Tatsuro Inamoto	April 26, 2014
737	19	"The Suspicious Walking Path"; Transliteration: "Giwaku no Sanpomichi" (Japanese: 疑惑の散歩道)	Koichiro Kuroda	Koshiro Mikami	May 3, 2014
738	20	"Kogoro In The Bar (Part 1)"; Transliteration: "Kogorō wa Bā ni iru (Zenpen)" (Japanese: 小五郎はBARにいる（前編）)	Shiro Izumi	N/A	May 10, 2014
739	21	"Kogoro In The Bar (Part 2)"; Transliteration: "Kogorō wa Bā ni iru (Kōhen)" (Japanese: 小五郎はBARにいる（後編）)	Akira Yoshimura	N/A	May 17, 2014

=== Season 24 (2014–15) ===
No.	No. in season	Title	Directed by	Written by	Original air date
740	1	"Bathroom Where Ran Collapsed As Well (Part 1)"; Transliteration: "Ran mo Taoreta Basurūmu (Zenpen)" (Japanese: 蘭も倒れたバスルーム（前編）)	Takanori Yano	N/A	May 31, 2014
741	2	"Bathroom Where Ran Collapsed As Well (Part 2)"; Transliteration: "Ran mo Taoreta Basurūmu (Kōhen)" (Japanese: 蘭も倒れたバスルーム（後編）)	Minoru Tozawa	N/A	June 7, 2014
742	3	"Promise with a J-Leaguer"; Transliteration: "J Rīgā to no Yakusoku" (Japanese: Jリーガーとの約束)	Kenichi Takeshita	Kazunari Kōchi	June 14, 2014
743	4	"Two Coincidental Successes"; Transliteration: "Gūzen wa ni Tabikasanaru" (Japanese: 偶然は二度重なる)	Koichiro Kuroda	Tatsuro Inamoto	June 21, 2014
744	5	"The Suspect is Makoto Kyogoku (Part 1)"; Transliteration: "Yōgisha ka Kyōgoku Makoto (Zenpen)" (Japanese: 容疑者か京極真（前編）)	Shiro Izumi	N/A	June 28, 2014
745	6	"The Suspect is Makoto Kyogoku (Part 2)"; Transliteration: "Yōgisha ka Kyōgoku Makoto (Kōhen)" (Japanese: 容疑者か京極真（後編）)	Akira Yoshimura	N/A	July 5, 2014
746	7	"Kaito Kid VS Makoto Kyogoku (Part 1)"; Transliteration: "Kaitō Kiddo VS Kyōgoku Makoto (Zenpen)" (Japanese: 怪盗キッドVS 京極真（前編）)	Takanori Yano	N/A	July 19, 2014
747	8	"Kaito Kid VS Makoto Kyogoku (Part 2)"; Transliteration: "Kaitō Kiddo VS Kyōgoku Makoto (Kōhen)" (Japanese: 怪盗キッドVS 京極真（後編）)	Minoru Tozawa	N/A	July 26, 2014
748	9	"Metropolitan Police Detective Love Story 9 (Confession)"; Transliteration: "Honchō no Keiji Koi Monogatari Kyū (Kokuhaku)" (Japanese: 本庁の刑事恋物語9（告白）)	Koichiro Kuroda	N/A	August 2, 2014
749	10	"Metropolitan Police Detective Love Story 9 (Truth)"; Transliteration: "Honchō no Keiji Koi Monogatari Kyū (Shinsō)" (Japanese: 本庁の刑事恋物語9（真相）)	Akira Yoshimura	N/A	August 9, 2014
750	11	"The Man Who Was Betrayed by the Sea"; Transliteration: "Umi ni Uragirareta Otoko" (Japanese: 海に裏切られた男)	Taichi Atarashi	Toyoto Kogiso	September 6, 2014
751	12	"The Case of the Lucky Calico (Part 1)"; Transliteration: "Maneki Mikeneko no Jiken (Zenpen)" (Japanese: 招き三毛猫の事件（前編）)	Takanori Yano	N/A	September 20, 2014
752	13	"The Case of the Lucky Calico (Part 2)"; Transliteration: "Maneki Mikeneko no Jiken (Kōhen)" (Japanese: 招き三毛猫の事件（後編）)	Minoru Tozawa	N/A	September 27, 2014
753	14	"The Blind Spot in the Share House"; Transliteration: "Shea Hausu no Shikaku" (Japanese: シェアハウスの死角)	Koichiro Kuroda	Koshiro Mikami	October 4, 2014
754	15	"The Tragedy of the Red Woman (Steam)"; Transliteration: "Akai Onna no Sangeki (Yukemuri)" (Japanese: 赤い女の惨劇（湯煙）)	Akira Yoshimura	N/A	October 11, 2014
755	16	"The Tragedy of the Red Woman (Evil Spirit)"; Transliteration: "Akai Onna no Sangeki (Akurei)" (Japanese: 赤い女の惨劇（悪霊）)	Taichi Atarashi	N/A	October 18, 2014
756	17	"The Tragedy of the Red Woman (Revenge)"; Transliteration: "Akai Onna no Sangeki (Fukushū)" (Japanese: 赤い女の惨劇（復讐）)	Nobuharu Kamanaka	N/A	October 25, 2014
757	18	"The Comedian Who Turned Himself In (Part 1)"; Transliteration: "Jishu Shita Owarai Geinin (Zenpen)" (Japanese: 自首したお笑い芸人（前編）)	Takanori Yano	Nobuo Ogizawa	November 1, 2014
758	19	"The Comedian Who Turned Himself In (Part 2)"; Transliteration: "Jishu Shita Owarai Geinin (Kōhen)" (Japanese: 自首したお笑い芸人（後編）)	Minoru Tozawa	Nobuo Ogizawa	November 8, 2014
759	20	"The Romance Novel with the Unexpected Conclusion (Part 1)"; Transliteration: "Igai na Kekka no Ren'ai Shōsetsu (Zenpen)" (Japanese: 意外な結果の恋愛小説（前編）)	Koichiro Kuroda	N/A	November 22, 2014
760	21	"The Romance Novel with the Unexpected Conclusion (Part 2)"; Transliteration: "Igai na Kekka no Ren'ai Shōsetsu (Kōhen)" (Japanese: 意外な結果の恋愛小説（後編）)	Akira Yoshimura	N/A	November 29, 2014
761	22	"Kaga Hyakumangoku Mystery Tour (Kanazawa Part)"; Transliteration: "Kaga Hyakumangoku Misuterī Tsuā (Kanazawa-hen)" (Japanese: 加賀百万石ミステリーツアー（金沢編）)	Yoko Fukushima	Atsushi Maekawa	December 6, 2014
762	23	"Kaga Hyakumangoku Mystery Tour (Kaga Part)"; Transliteration: "Kaga Hyakumangoku Misuterī Tsuā (Kaga-hen)" (Japanese: 加賀百万石ミステリーツアー（加賀編）)	Nobuharu Kamanaka	Atsushi Maekawa	December 13, 2014
763	24	"Conan and Heiji, Code of Love (Part 1)"; Transliteration: "Conan to Heiji Koi no Angō (Zenpen)" (Japanese: コナンと平次 恋の暗号（前編）)	Minoru Tozawa	N/A	January 10, 2015
764	25	"Conan and Heiji, Code of Love (Part 2)"; Transliteration: "Conan to Heiji Koi no Angō (Kōhen)" (Japanese: コナンと平次 恋の暗号（後編）)	Takanori Yano	N/A	January 17, 2015
765	26	"Teimuzu River Kite Flying Case (Part 1)"; Transliteration: "Teimuzu-gawa Takoage Jiken (Zenpen)" (Japanese: 堤無津川凧揚げ事件（前編）)	Koichiro Kuroda	N/A	January 24, 2015
766	27	"Teimuzu River Kite Flying Case (Part 2)"; Transliteration: "Teimuzu-gawa Takoage Jiken (Kōhen)" (Japanese: 堤無津川凧揚げ事件（後編）)	Akira Yoshimura	N/A	January 31, 2015
767	28	"The Lover Gone Missing in a Snowstorm"; Transliteration: "Fubuki ni Kieta Koibito" (Japanese: 吹雪に消えた恋人)	Daisuke Takashima	Tatsuro Inamoto	February 7, 2015
768	29	"Ai Haibara Imprisonment Case"; Transliteration: "Haibara Ai Kankin Jiken" (Japanese: 灰原哀監禁事件)	Nobuharu Kamanaka	Masaki Tsuji	February 21, 2015
769	30	"The Troublesome Emergency Patient"; Transliteration: "Mendōna Kyūkyū Kanja" (Japanese: 面倒な救急患者)	Minoru Tozawa	Junichi Miyashita	February 28, 2015
770	31	"The Tense Tea Party (Part 1)"; Transliteration: "Gisugisu Shita Ochakai (Zenpen)" (Japanese: ギスギスしたお茶会（前編）)	Takanori Yano	N/A	March 7, 2015
771	32	"The Tense Tea Party (Part 2)"; Transliteration: "Gisugisu Shita Ochakai (Kōhen)" (Japanese: ギスギスしたお茶会（後編）)	Koichiro Kuroda	N/A	March 14, 2015
772	33	"Shinichi Kudō Aquarium Case (Part 1)"; Transliteration: "Kudō Shin'ichi Suizokukan Jiken (Zenpen)" (Japanese: 工藤新一水族館事件（前編）)	Akira Yoshimura	N/A	March 21, 2015
773	34	"Shinichi Kudō Aquarium Case (Part 2)"; Transliteration: "Kudō Shin'ichi Suizokukan Jiken (Kōhen)" (Japanese: 工藤新一水族館事件（後編）)	Nobuharu Kamanaka	N/A	March 28, 2015
774	35	"Munch's Missing Scream"; Transliteration: "Kieta Munku no Sakebi" (Japanese: 消えたムンクの叫び)	Minoru Tozawa	Takeharu Sakurai	April 18, 2015
775	36	"The Manipulated Great Detective (Part 1)"; Transliteration: "Ayatsurareta Meitantei (Zenpen)" (Japanese: あやつられた名探偵（前編）)	Makiko Hayase	N/A	April 25, 2015
776	37	"The Manipulated Great Detective (Part 2)"; Transliteration: "Ayatsurareta Meitantei (Kōhen)" (Japanese: あやつられた名探偵（後編）)	Keiya Saito	N/A	May 2, 2015
777	38	"Detective Boys vs. Elderly Detective League"; Transliteration: "Shōnen Tanteidan VS Shirubā Tanteidan" (Japanese: 少年探偵団VS老人探偵団)	Koichiro Kuroda	Nobuo Ogizawa	May 9, 2015
778	39	"Mirage of the Disappearing Angel"; Transliteration: "Tenshi ga Kieta Shinkirō" (Japanese: 天使が消えた蜃気楼)	Akira Yoshimura	Tatsuro Inamoto	May 16, 2015

=== Season 25 (2015–16) ===
No.	No. in season	Title	Directed by	Written by	Original air date
779	1	"The Scarlet Prologue"; Transliteration: "Hīro no Joshō" (Japanese: 緋色の序章)	Minoru Tozawa	N/A	May 30, 2015
780	2	"The Scarlet Pursuit"; Transliteration: "Hīro no Suikyū" (Japanese: 緋色の追求)	Takanori Yano	N/A	June 6, 2015
781	3	"The Scarlet Intersection"; Transliteration: "Hīro no Kōsaku" (Japanese: 緋色の交錯)	Nobuharu Kamanaka	N/A	June 13, 2015
782	4	"The Scarlet Return"; Transliteration: "Hiiro no Kikan" (Japanese: 緋色の帰還)	Akira Yoshimura	N/A	June 20, 2015
783	5	"The Scarlet Truth"; Transliteration: "Hiiro no Shinsō" (Japanese: 緋色の真相)	Yasuichiro Yamamoto	N/A	June 27, 2015
784	6	"Welcome to Club Orihime"; Transliteration: "Orihime Kurabu he Yōkoso" (Japanese: 織り姫クラブへようこそ)	Keisuke Shinohara	Junichi Miyashita	July 11, 2015
785	7	"Taiko Meijin's Match of Love (Part 1)"; Transliteration: "Taikō Koisuru Meijin-sen (Zenpen)" (Japanese: 太閤恋する名人戦（前編）)	Koichiro Kuroda	N/A	July 18, 2015
786	8	"Taiko Meijin's Match of Love (Part 2)"; Transliteration: "Taikō Koisuru Meijin-sen (Kōhen)" (Japanese: 太閤恋する名人戦（後編）)	Minoru Tozawa	N/A	July 25, 2015
787	9	"The Mystery Sinking in the Midsummer Pool (Part 1)"; Transliteration: "Manatsu no Pūru ni Shizumu Nazo (Zenpen)" (Japanese: 真夏のプールに沈む謎（前編）)	Takanori Yano	N/A	August 1, 2015
788	10	"The Mystery Sinking in the Midsummer Pool (Part 2)"; Transliteration: "Manatsu no Pū ni Shizumu Nazo (Kōhen)" (Japanese: 真夏のプールに沈む謎（後編）)	Makiko Hayase	N/A	August 8, 2015
789	11	"The Queen's Weather Forecast"; Transliteration: "Joō-sama no Tenkiyohō" (Japanese: 女王様の天気予報)	Yorihisa Koyata	Koshiro Mikami	August 15, 2015
790	12	"Bekapon's Bleeding Service"; Transliteration: "Bekapon Shukettsu Dai Sābisu" (Japanese: 米花ポン出血大サービス)	Koichiro Kuroda	Nobuo Ogizawa	September 5, 2015
791	13	"Detective Takagi On the Run in Handcuffs"; Transliteration: "Takagi-keiji, Tejō de Tōsō" (Japanese: 高木刑事、手錠で逃走)	Akira Yoshimura	Junichi Miyashita	September 12, 2015
792	14	"Three First Discoverers (Part 1)"; Transliteration: "San'nin no Daiichihakkensha (Zenpen)" (Japanese: 三人の第一発見者（前編）)	Keisuke Shinohara	N/A	September 19, 2015
793	15	"Three First Discoverers (Part 2)"; Transliteration: "San'nin no Daiichihakkensha (Kōhen)" (Japanese: 三人の第一発見者（後編）)	Minoru Tozawa	N/A	September 26, 2015
794	16	"Bodyguard Kogorō Mōri"; Transliteration: "Bodīgādo Mōri Kogorō" (Japanese: ボディーガード毛利小五郎)	Takanori Yano	Junichi Miyashita	October 3, 2015
795	17	"The Secret of the Missing Young Lady"; Transliteration: "Wakaokusama ga Kieta Himitsu" (Japanese: 若奥様が消えた秘密)	Yasuichiro Yamamoto	Tatsuro Inamoto	October 10, 2015
796	18	"The Lovebirds' Ruse"; Transliteration: "Oshidorifūfu no Sakuryaku" (Japanese: おしどり夫婦の策略)	Makiko Hayase	Shintaro Ueda Nobuo Ogizawa	October 17, 2015
797	19	"The Dreaming Girl's Confused Deduction"; Transliteration: "Yumemiru Otome no Meisuiri" (Japanese: 夢見る乙女の迷推理)	Koichiro Kuroda	Junichi Miyashita	October 24, 2015
798	20	"The Moving Target"; Transliteration: "Ugoku Hyōteki" (Japanese: 動く標的)	Akira Yoshimura	Nobuo Ogizawa	November 7, 2015
799	21	"Detective Boys' Locked Room Mystery Battle"; Transliteration: "Tantei-dan no Misshitsu Suiri Gassen" (Japanese: 探偵団の密室推理合戦)	Takanori Yano	Masaki Tsuji	November 14, 2015
800	22	"After That 100 Million Yen"; Transliteration: "Ichiokuen o Oikakero" (Japanese: 1億円を追いかけろ)	Minoru Tozawa	Takeo Ohno	November 21, 2015
801	23	"Tottori Sand Dunes Mystery Tour (Kurayoshi Part)"; Transliteration: "Tottori Sakyū Misuterī Tsuā (Kurayoshi-hen)" (Japanese: 鳥取砂丘ミステリーツアー（倉吉編）)	Keiya Saito	Nobuo Ogizawa	November 28, 2015
802	24	"Tottori Sand Dunes Mystery Tour (Tottori Part)"; Transliteration: "Tottori Sakyū Misuterī Tsuā (Tottori-hen)" (Japanese: 鳥取砂丘ミステリーツアー（鳥取編）)	Makiko Hayase	Nobuo Ogizawa	December 5, 2015
803	25	"The Pitfall of Fire Precautions"; Transliteration: "Hi-no-Yōjin no Otoshiana" (Japanese: 火の用心の落とし穴)	Koichiro Kuroda	Junichi Miyashita	December 12, 2015
804	26	"Conan and Ebizō's Kabuki Jūhachiban Mystery (Part 1)"; Transliteration: "Konan to Ebizō Kabuki Jūhachiban Misuterī (Zenpen)" (Japanese: コナンと海老蔵 歌舞伎十八番ミステリー（前編）)	Hajime Kamegaki	Hiroshi Kashiwabara	January 9, 2016 (Note: The episodes were aired as a single hour long episode in Japan.)
805	27	"Conan and Ebizō's Kabuki Jūhachiban Mystery (Part 2)"; Transliteration: "Konan to Ebizō Kabuki Jūhachiban Misuterī (Kōhen)" (Japanese: コナンと海老蔵 歌舞伎十八番ミステリー（後編）)	Yasuichiro Yamamoto	Hiroshi Kashiwabara	January 16, 2016
806	28	"The Ventriloquist's Illusion (Part 1)"; Transliteration: "Fukuwajutsushi no Sakkaku (Zenpen)" (Japanese: 腹話術師の錯覚（前編）)	Akira Yoshimura	Junichi Miyashita	January 30, 2016
807	29	"The Ventriloquist's Illusion (Part 2)"; Transliteration: "Fukuwajutsushi no Sakkaku (Kōhen)" (Japanese: 腹話術師の錯覚（後編）)	Takanori Yano	Junichi Miyashita	February 6, 2016
808	30	"The Kamaitachi Inn (Part 1)"; Transliteration: "Kamaitachi no Yado (Zenpen)" (Japanese: かまいたちの宿（前編）)	Minoru Tozawa	N/A	February 13, 2016
809	31	"The Kamaitachi Inn (Part 2)"; Transliteration: "Kamaitachi no Yado (Kōhen)" (Japanese: かまいたちの宿（後編）)	Keiya Saito	N/A	February 20, 2016
810	32	"The Darkness of the Prefectural Police (Part 1)"; Transliteration: "Kenkei no Kuroi Yami (Zenpen)" (Japanese: 県警の黒い闇（前編）)	Nobuharu Kamanaka	N/A	February 27, 2016
811	33	"The Darkness of the Prefectural Police (Part 2)"; Transliteration: "Kenkei no Kuroi Yami (Chūhen)" (Japanese: 県警の黒い闇 (中編))	Koichiro Kuroda	N/A	March 5, 2016
812	34	"The Darkness of the Prefectural Police (Part 3)"; Transliteration: "Kenkei no Kuroi Yami (Kōhen)" (Japanese: 県警の黒い闇（後編）)	Akira Yoshimura	N/A	March 12, 2016
813	35	"The Shadow Approaching Amuro"; Transliteration: "Amuro ni Shinobiyoru Kage" (Japanese: 安室に忍びよる影)	Takanori Yano	Takeharu Sakurai	April 16, 2016
814	36	"The Actress Blogger's Locked Room Case (Part 1)"; Transliteration: "Burogu Joyū no Misshitsu Jiken (Zenpen)" (Japanese: ブログ女優の密室事件（前編）)	Minoru Tozawa	N/A	April 23, 2016
815	37	"The Actress Blogger's Locked Room Case (Part 2)"; Transliteration: "Burogu Joyū no Misshitsu Jiken (Kōhen)" (Japanese: ブログ女優の密室事件（後編）)	Makiko Hayase	N/A	April 30, 2016
816	38	"The Disappointing and Kind Alien"; Transliteration: "Zan'nen de Yasashii Uchūjin" (Japanese: 残念でやさしい宇宙人)	Yoshio Suzuki	Nobuo Ogizawa	May 7, 2016
817	39	"The Missing Fiancée"; Transliteration: "Kieta Fianse" (Japanese: 消えたフィアンセ)	Koichiro Kuroda	Nobuo Ogizawa	May 14, 2016

=== Season 26 (2016–17) ===
No.	No. in season	Title	Directed by	Written by	Original air date
818	1	"Kogoro's Pursuit of Rage (Part 1)"; Transliteration: "Kogorō, Ikari no Daitsuiseki (Zenpen)" (Japanese: 小五郎、怒りの大追跡（前編）)	Akira Yoshimura	Toshimichi Okawa	May 21, 2016
819	2	"Kogoro's Pursuit of Rage (Part 2)"; Transliteration: "Kogorō, Ikari no Daitsuiseki (Kōhen)" (Japanese: 小五郎、怒りの大追跡（後編）)	Takanori Yano	Toshimichi Okawa	May 28, 2016
820	3	"The Seven People in the Waiting Room"; Transliteration: "Machiaishitsu no Nana-nin" (Japanese: 待合室の7人)	Minoru Tozawa	Junichi Miyashita	June 4, 2016
821	4	"The Hidden Secret of Dongaraji Temple"; Transliteration: "Dongara-ji ga Kakusu Himitsu" (Japanese: 曇柄寺が隠す秘密)	Yoko Fukushima	Nobuo Ogizawa	June 11, 2016
822	5	"The Suspects Are a Passionate Couple (Part 1)"; Transliteration: "Yōgisha wa Netsuai Kappuru (Zenpen)" (Japanese: 容疑者は熱愛カップル（前編）)	Yoshitaka Fujimoto	N/A	June 18, 2016
823	6	"The Suspects Are a Passionate Couple (Part 2)"; Transliteration: "Yōgisha wa Netsuai Kappuru (Kōhen)" (Japanese: 容疑者は熱愛カップル（後編）)	Toshio Kiuchi	N/A	June 25, 2016
824	7	"The Detective Boys Get Out of the Rain"; Transliteration: "Shōnen Tantei-dan no Amayadori" (Japanese: 少年探偵団の雨宿り)	Koichiro Kuroda	Tatsuro Inamoto	July 9, 2016
825	8	"The Tidal Park Comeback Case"; Transliteration: "Shioiri Kōen Gyakuten Jiken" (Japanese: 潮入り公園逆転事件)	Akira Yoshimura	Hiro Masaki	July 16, 2016
826	9	"The Beauty, The Lies, and The Secrets"; Transliteration: "Bijo to Uso to Himitsu" (Japanese: 美女とウソと秘密)	Takanori Yano	Toshimichi Okawa	July 23, 2016
827	10	"Ramen So Good, It's to Die For 2 (Part 1)"; Transliteration: "Shinu Hodo Umai Rāmen 2 (Zenpen)" (Japanese: 死ぬほど美味いラーメン2（前編）)	Minoru Tozawa	N/A	July 30, 2016
828	11	"Ramen So Good, It's to Die For 2 (Part 2)"; Transliteration: "Shinu Hodo Umai Rāmen 2 (Kōhen)" (Japanese: 死ぬほど美味いラーメン2（後編）)	Makiko Hayase	N/A	August 6, 2016
829	12	"The Mysterious Boy"; Transliteration: "Fushigi na Shōnen" (Japanese: 不思議な少年)	Tetsuaki Mita	Takahiro Okura	August 13, 2016
830	13	"A Cottage Surrounded By Zombies (Part 1)"; Transliteration: "Zombi ga Kakomu Bessō (Zenpen)" (Japanese: ゾンビが囲む別荘（前編）)	Koichiro Kuroda	N/A	September 3, 2016
831	14	"A Cottage Surrounded By Zombies (Part 2)"; Transliteration: "Zombi ga Kakomu Bessō (Chūhen)" (Japanese: ゾンビが囲む別荘 （中編）)	Hiroshi Akiyama	N/A	September 10, 2016
832	15	"A Cottage Surrounded By Zombies (Part 3)"; Transliteration: "Zombi ga Kakomu Bessō (Kōhen)" (Japanese: ゾンビが囲む別荘（後編）)	Akira Yoshimura	N/A	September 17, 2016
833	16	"The Great Detective's Weakness"; Transliteration: "Meitantei ni Jakuten Ari" (Japanese: 名探偵に弱点あり)	Takanori Yano	Junichi Miyashita	September 24, 2016
834	17	"The Man Who Died Twice (Part 1)"; Transliteration: "Nido Shinda Otoko (Zenpen)" (Japanese: 二度死んだ男（前編）)	Minoru Tozawa	Nobuo Ogizawa	October 1, 2016
835	18	"The Man Who Died Twice (Part 2)"; Transliteration: "Nido Shinda Otoko (Kōhen)" (Japanese: 二度死んだ男（後編）)	Yoko Fukushima	Nobuo Ogizawa	October 8, 2016
836	19	"The Unfriendly Girls Band (Part 1)"; Transliteration: "Naka no Warui Gāruzu Bando (Zenpen)" (Japanese: 仲の悪いガールズバンド（前編）)	Nobuharu Kamanaka	N/A	October 15, 2016
837	20	"The Unfriendly Girls Band (Part 2)"; Transliteration: "Naka no Warui Gāruzu Bando (Kōhen)" (Japanese: 仲の悪いガールズバンド（後編）)	Koichiro Kuroda	N/A	October 22, 2016
838	21	"Mysterious Case in a Hot Air Balloon"; Transliteration: "Funwari Kikyū de Kaijiken" (Japanese: ふんわり気球で怪事件)	Tetsuaki Mita	Toyoto Kogiso	November 5, 2016
839	22	"You Can Hear the Tengu's Voice"; Transliteration: "Tengu no Koe ga Kikoeru" (Japanese: 天狗の声が聞こえる)	Takanori Yano	Hiro Masaki	November 12, 2016
840	23	"The Last Gift"; Transliteration: "Saigo no Okurimono" (Japanese: 最後の贈り物)	Minoru Tozawa	Nobuo Ogizawa	November 19, 2016
841	24	"The Rainy Bus Stop"; Transliteration: "Ame no Basusutoppu" (Japanese: 雨のバス停)	Akira Yoshimura	Junichi Iioka Yuki Notsuka	November 26, 2016
842	25	"Turning Point on a Driving Date"; Transliteration: "Doraibu Dēto no Wakaremichi" (Japanese: ドライブデートの別れ道)	Makiko Hayase	Nobuo Ogizawa	December 10, 2016
843	26	"The Detective Boys in a Grove (Part 1)"; Transliteration: "Tantei-dan wa Yabu no Naka (Zenpen)" (Japanese: 探偵団はヤブの中（前編）)	Koichiro Kuroda	N/A	December 17, 2016
844	27	"The Detective Boys in a Grove (Part 2)"; Transliteration: "Tantei-dan wa Yabu no Naka (Kōhen)" (Japanese: 探偵団はヤブの中（後編）)	Nobuharu Kamanaka	N/A	December 24, 2016
845	28	"Conan Cornered in the Darkness (Part 1)"; Transliteration: "Zettai Zetsumei Kurayami no Conan (Zenpen)" (Japanese: 絶体絶命暗闇のコナン（前編）)	Takanori Yano	Junichi Miyashita	January 7, 2017
846	29	"Conan Cornered in the Darkness (Part 2)"; Transliteration: "Zettai Zetsumei Kurayami no Conan (Kōhen)" (Japanese: 絶体絶命暗闇のコナン（後編）)	Minoru Tozawa	Junichi Miyashita	January 14, 2017
847	30	"Chiba's Difficult UFO Case (Part 1)"; Transliteration: "Chiba no Yūfō Nanjiken (Zenpen)" (Japanese: 千葉のUFO難事件（前編）)	Akira Yoshimura	N/A	January 28, 2017
848	31	"Chiba's Difficult UFO Case (Part 2)"; Transliteration: "Chiba no Yūfō Nanjiken (Kōhen)" (Japanese: 千葉のUFO難事件（後編）)	Koichiro Kuroda	N/A	February 4, 2017
849	32	"The Marriage Registration's Password (Part 1)"; Transliteration: "Kon'intodoke no Pasuwādo (Zenpen)" (Japanese: 婚姻届のパスワード（前編）)	Tetsuaki Mita	N/A	February 11, 2017
850	33	"The Marriage Registration's Password (Part 2)"; Transliteration: "Kon'intodoke no Pasuwādo (Kōhen)" (Japanese: 婚姻届のパスワード（後編）)	Nobuharu Kamanaka	N/A	February 18, 2017
851	34	"The Descent Into Hell Tour of Love (Beppu Chapter)"; Transliteration: "Koi no Jigoku-meguri Tsuā (Beppu-hen)" (Japanese: 恋の地獄めぐりツアー（別府編）)	Takanori Yano	Toshimichi Okawa	March 4, 2017
852	35	"The Descent Into Hell Tour of Love (Oita Chapter)"; Transliteration: "Koi no Jigoku-meguri Tsuā (Ōita-hen)" (Japanese: 恋の地獄めぐりツアー（大分編）)	Minoru Tozawa	Toshimichi Okawa	March 11, 2017
853	36	"Memories from Sakura Class (Ran GIRL)"; Transliteration: "Sakura-gumi no Omoide (Ran Gāru)" (Japanese: サクラ組の思い出（蘭GIRL）)	Yasuichiro Yamamoto	N/A	March 18, 2017
854	37	"Memories from Sakura Class (Shinichi BOY)"; Transliteration: "Sakura-gumi no Omoide (Shin'ichi Bōi)" (Japanese: サクラ組の思い出（新一BOY）)	Yasuichiro Yamamoto	N/A	March 25, 2017
855	38	"The Mystery of the Vanished Black Belt"; Transliteration: "Kieta Kuroobi no Nazo" (Japanese: 消えた黒帯の謎)	Akira Yoshimura	Takahiro Okura	April 15, 2017
856	39	"The Socialite Couple's Secret"; Transliteration: "Serebu Fūfu no Himitsu" (Japanese: セレブ夫婦の秘密)	Koichiro Kuroda	Junichi Iioka Yuki Notsuka	April 22, 2017

=== Season 27 (2017–18) ===
No.	No. in season	Title	Directed by	Written by	Original air date
857	1	"The Shifting Mystery of Beika City (Part One)"; Transliteration: "Beika-chō Niten-santen Misuterī (Zenpen)" (Japanese: 米花町二転三転ミステリー（前編）)	Takanori Yano	Nobuo Ogizawa	April 29, 2017
858	2	"The Shifting Mystery of Beika City (Part Two)"; Transliteration: "Beika-chō Niten-santen Misuterī (Kōhen)" (Japanese: 米花町二転三転ミステリー（後編）)	Minoru Tozawa	Nobuo Ogizawa	May 6, 2017
859	3	"The Dark Mountain Route"; Transliteration: "Kurayami no Sangaku Rūto" (Japanese: 暗闇の山岳ルート)	Yoko Fukushima	Koshiro Mikami	May 13, 2017
860	4	"The Security System's Pitfall"; Transliteration: "Bōhan Shisutemu no Otoshiana" (Japanese: 防犯システムの落とし穴)	Koichiro Kuroda	Junichi Iioka Yuki Notsuka	May 20, 2017
861	5	"Just Like a 17-Year-Old Crime Scene (Part One)"; Transliteration: "Jūnananen-mae to Onaji Genba (Zenpen)" (Japanese: 17年前と同じ現場（前編）)	Nobuharu Kamanaka	N/A	June 3, 2017
862	6	"Just Like a 17-Year-Old Crime Scene (Part Two)"; Transliteration: "Jūnananen-mae to Onaji Genba (Kōhen)" (Japanese: 17年前と同じ現場（後編）)	Akira Yoshimura	N/A	June 10, 2017
863	7	"The Spirit Detective's Murder (Part One)"; Transliteration: "Reikon Tantei Satsugai Jiken (Zenpen)" (Japanese: 霊魂探偵殺害事件（前編）)	Takanori Yano	N/A	June 17, 2017
864	8	"The Spirit Detective's Murder (Part Two)"; Transliteration: "Reikon Tantei Satsugai Jiken (Kōhen)" (Japanese: 霊魂探偵殺害事件（後編）)	Minoru Tozawa	N/A	June 24, 2017
865	9	"The Foul-Mouthed Myna Bird"; Transliteration: "Kuchi no Warui Kyūkanchō" (Japanese: 口の悪い九官鳥)	Makiko Hayase	Masaki Tsuji	July 8, 2017
866	10	"The Traitor's Stage (Part One)"; Transliteration: "Uragiri no Sutēji (Zenpen)" (Japanese: 裏切りのステージ（前編）)	Nobuharu Kamanaka	N/A	July 15, 2017
867	11	"The Traitor's Stage (Part Two)"; Transliteration: "Uragiri no Sutēji (Kōhen)" (Japanese: 裏切りのステージ（後編）)	Nobuharu Kamanaka	N/A	July 22, 2017
868	12	"The Whistling Bookstore"; Transliteration: "Kiteki no Kikoeru Koshoten" (Japanese: 汽笛の聞こえる古書店)	Koichiro Kuroda	Junichi Iioka Yuki Notsuka	July 29, 2017
869	13	"Conan Disappears Over a Cliff (Part One)"; Transliteration: "Dangai ni Kieta Conan (Zenpen)" (Japanese: 断崖に消えたコナン（前編）)	Akira Yoshimura	Junichi Miyashita	August 5, 2017
870	14	"Conan Disappears Over a Cliff (Part Two)"; Transliteration: "Dangai ni Kieta Conan (Kōhen)" (Japanese: 断崖に消えたコナン（後編）)	Takanori Yano	Junichi Miyashita	August 12, 2017
871	15	"The Nobunaga 450 Case"; Transliteration: "Nobunaga Yon-gō-maru Jiken" (Japanese: ノブナガ四五〇事件)	Minoru Tozawa	Junichi Miyashita	September 2, 2017
872	16	"Conan and Heiji's Nue Legend (Roar Chapter)"; Transliteration: "Conan to Heiji no Nue Densetsu (Nakigoe-hen)" (Japanese: コナンと平次の鵺伝説（鳴声編）)	Yoko Fukushima	N/A	September 9, 2017
873	17	"Conan and Heiji's Nue Legend (Scratch Chapter)"; Transliteration: "Conan to Heiji no Nue Densetsu (Tsumeato-hen)" (Japanese: コナンと平次の鵺伝説（爪跡編）)	Hiroya Saito	N/A	September 16, 2017
874	18	"Conan and Heiji's Nue Legend (Resolution Chapter)"; Transliteration: "Conan to Heiji no Nue Densetsu (Kaiketsu-hen)" (Japanese: コナンと平次の鵺伝説（解決編）)	Nobuharu Kamanaka	N/A	September 23, 2017
875	19	"The Mysterious Prophetic Buddha"; Transliteration: "Fushigi na Yochi Butsuzō" (Japanese: 不思議な予知仏像)	Koichiro Kuroda	Toyoto Kogiso	September 30, 2017
876	20	"The Mechanical Eyewitness"; Transliteration: "Kikai-jikake no Mokugekisha" (Japanese: 機械じかけの目撃者)	Akira Yoshimura	Hiro Masaki	October 7, 2017
877	21	"A Pair of Crossing Fates"; Transliteration: "Kōsa-suru Unmei no Futari" (Japanese: 交差する運命の二人)	Takanori Yano	Nobuo Ogizawa	October 14, 2017
878	22	"The Blind Spot in the Changing Room (Part One)"; Transliteration: "Shichakushitsu no Shikaku (Zenpen)" (Japanese: 試着室の死角（前編）)	Minoru Tozawa	N/A	October 28, 2017
879	23	"The Blind Spot in the Changing Room (Part Two)"; Transliteration: "Shichakushitsu no Shikaku (Kōhen)" (Japanese: 試着室の死角（後編）)	Hiroya Saito	N/A	November 4, 2017
880	24	"The Detective Boys and the Haunted House"; Transliteration: "Tantei-dan to Yūrei Yakata" (Japanese: 探偵団と幽霊館)	Hiroaki Takagi	Toyoto Kogiso	November 11, 2017
881	25	"The Magician of the Waves (Part One)"; Transliteration: "Sazanami no Mahōtsukai (Zenpen)" (Japanese: さざ波の魔法使い（前編）)	Nobuharu Kamanaka	N/A	November 18, 2017
882	26	"The Magician of the Waves (Part Two)"; Transliteration: "Sazanami no Mahōtsukai (Kōhen)" (Japanese: さざ波の魔法使い（後編）)	Akira Yoshimura	N/A	November 25, 2017
883	27	"The Pop-up Book Bomber (Part One)"; Transliteration: "Ehon Kara Tobidasu Bakudanma (Zenpen)" (Japanese: 絵本から飛び出す爆弾魔（前編）)	Koichiro Kuroda	Junichi Miyashita	December 2, 2017
884	28	"The Pop-up Book Bomber (Part Two)"; Transliteration: "Ehon Kara Tobidasu Bakudanma (Kōhen)" (Japanese: 絵本から飛び出す爆弾魔（後編）)	Takanori Yano	Junichi Miyashita	December 9, 2017
885	29	"Solving Mysteries at the Poirot Café (Part One)"; Transliteration: "Nazotoki wa Kissa Poirot de (Zenpen)" (Japanese: 謎解きは喫茶ポアロで（前編）)	Minoru Tozawa	N/A	December 16, 2017
886	30	"Solving Mysteries at the Poirot Café (Part Two)"; Transliteration: "Nazotoki wa Kissa Poirot de (Kōhen)" (Japanese: 謎解きは喫茶ポアロで（後編）)	Hiroya Saito	N/A	December 23, 2017
887	31	"Kaito Kid and the Trick Box (Part One)"; Transliteration: "Kaitō Kiddo no Karakuribako (Zenpen)" (Japanese: 怪盗キッドの絡繰箱（前編）)	Hiroaki Takagi	N/A	January 6, 2018
888	32	"Kaito Kid and the Trick Box (Part Two)"; Transliteration: "Kaitō Kiddo no Karakuribako (Kōhen)" (Japanese: 怪盗キッドの絡繰箱（後編）)	Yoshitaka Nagaoka	N/A	January 13, 2018
889	33	"The New Teacher's Skeleton Case (Part One)"; Transliteration: "Shinnin Kyōshi no Gaikotsu Jiken (Zenpen)" (Japanese: 新任教師の骸骨事件（前編）)	Akira Yoshimura	N/A	January 20, 2018
890	34	"The New Teacher's Skeleton Case (Part Two)"; Transliteration: "Shinnin Kyōshi no Gaikotsu Jiken (Kōhen)" (Japanese: 新任教師の骸骨事件（後編）)	Mamiko Sekiya	N/A	January 27, 2018
891	35	"Bakumatsu Revolution Mystery Tour (Yamaguchi Arc)"; Transliteration: "Bakumatsu Ishin Misuterī Tsuā (Yamaguchi-hen)" (Japanese: 幕末維新ミステリーツアー（山口編）)	Koichiro Kuroda	Toshimichi Okawa	February 3, 2018
892	36	"Bakumatsu Revolution Mystery Tour (Hagi Arc)"; Transliteration: "Bakumatsu Ishin Misuterī Tsuā (Hagi-hen)" (Japanese: 幕末維新ミステリーツアー（萩編）)	Hiroya Saito	Toshimichi Okawa	February 10, 2018
893	37	"The Mystery of the Michelin Starred Restaurant"; Transliteration: "Hoshitsuki Resutoran no Nazo" (Japanese: 星付きレストランの謎)	Takanori Yano	Junichi Miyashita	February 24, 2018
894	38	"The Tokyo-Style Detective Show Next Door (Part One)"; Transliteration: "Tonari no Edomae Suiri Shō (Zenpen)" (Japanese: となりの江戸前推理ショー（前編）)	Minoru Tozawa	N/A	March 3, 2018
895	39	"The Tokyo-Style Detective Show Next Door (Part Two)"; Transliteration: "Tonari no Edomae Suiri Shō (Kōhen)" (Japanese: となりの江戸前推理ショー（後編）)	Hiroaki Takagi	N/A	March 10, 2018
896	40	"The Woman With White Hands (Part One)"; Transliteration: "Shiroi Te no Onna (Zenpen)" (Japanese: 白い手の女（前編）)	Nobuharu Kamanaka	N/A	March 17, 2018
897	41	"The Woman With White Hands (Part Two)"; Transliteration: "Shiroi Te no Onna (Kōhen)" (Japanese: 白い手の女（後編）)	Akira Yoshimura	N/A	March 24, 2018

=== Season 28 (2018) ===
No.	No. in season	Title	Directed by	Written by	Original air date
898	1	"The Melting Cake!"; Transliteration: "Kēki ga Toketa!" (Japanese: ケーキが溶けた！)	Koichiro Kuroda	Takeharu Sakurai	April 7, 2018
899	2	"The Real Culprit's Scream"; Transliteration: "Shinhannin no Sakebigoe" (Japanese: 真犯人の叫び声)	Takanori Yano	Yuko Okabe	April 28, 2018
900	3	"Solving Mysteries in a Locked Room"; Transliteration: "Misshitsu no Nazotoki Shou" (Japanese: 密室の謎解きショウ)	Minoru Tozawa	Nobuo Ogizawa	May 5, 2018
901	4	"Lawyer Kisaki's SOS (Part One)"; Transliteration: "Kisaki-bengoshi esu-ō-esu (Zenpen)" (Japanese: 妃弁護士SOS（前編）)	Nobuharu Kamanaka	N/A	May 12, 2018
902	5	"Lawyer Kisaki's SOS (Part Two)"; Transliteration: "Kisaki-bengoshi esu-ō-esu (Kōhen)" (Japanese: 妃弁護士SOS（後編）)	Akira Yoshimura	N/A	May 19, 2018
903	6	"Birds of a Feather at Loggerheads"; Transliteration: "Nitamono Dōshi ga Ken'en no Naka" (Japanese: 似た者同士が犬猿の仲)	Koichiro Kuroda	Junichi Miyashita	May 26, 2018
904	7	"Result of the Draw"; Transliteration: "Aiuchi no Hate" (Japanese: 相討ちの果て)	Hiroaki Takagi	Kenjin Sata	June 9, 2018
905	8	"Eyewitness Testimony Seven Years Later (Part One)"; Transliteration: "Nananen-go no Mokugeki Shōgen (Zenpen)" (Japanese: 七年後の目撃証言（前編）)	Takanori Yano	Chiko Uonji	June 23, 2018
906	9	"Eyewitness Testimony Seven Years Later (Part Two)"; Transliteration: "Nananen-go no Mokugeki Shōgen (Kōhen)" (Japanese: 七年後の目撃証言（後編）)	Minoru Tozawa	Chiko Uonji	June 30, 2018
907	10	"The J League Bodyguard"; Transliteration: "Jei Rīgu no Yōjinbō" (Japanese: Jリーグの用心棒)	Hajime Kamegaki	Hajime Kamegaki	July 14, 2018
908	11	"Friendship Washed Away In The Riverbed"; Transliteration: "Kawadoko ni Nagareta Yūjō" (Japanese: 川床に流れた友情)	Nobuharu Kamanaka	Yasutoshi Murakawa	July 21, 2018
909	12	"Mystery of the Burning Tent (Part One)"; Transliteration: "Moeru Tento no Kai (Zenpen)" (Japanese: 燃えるテントの怪（前編）)	Akira Yoshimura	Umesaburo Sagawa	July 28, 2018
910	13	"Mystery of the Burning Tent (Part Two)"; Transliteration: "Moeru Tento no Kai (Kōhen)" (Japanese: 燃えるテントの怪（後編）)	Koichiro Kuroda	Umesaburo Sagawa	August 4, 2018
911	14	"The Job Request From Inspector Megure"; Transliteration: "Megure-keibu kara no Irai" (Japanese: 目暮警部からの依頼)	Hiroaki Takagi	Nobuo Ogizawa	September 1, 2018
912	15	"The Detective Boys Become Models"; Transliteration: "Moderu ni Natta Tanteidan" (Japanese: モデルになった探偵団)	Takanori Yano	Toyoto Kogiso	September 8, 2018
913	16	"Conan Kidnapped (Part One)"; Transliteration: "Tsuresarareta Conan (Zenpen)" (Japanese: 連れ去られたコナン（前編）)	Minoru Tozawa	Junichi Miyashita	September 15, 2018
914	17	"Conan Kidnapped (Part Two)"; Transliteration: "Tsuresarareta Conan (Kōhen)" (Japanese: 連れ去られたコナン（後編）)	Nobuharu Kamanaka	Junichi Miyashita	September 22, 2018
915	18	"High School Girl Detective Suzuki Sonoko"; Transliteration: "Jēkē Tantei Suzuki Sonoko" (Japanese: JK探偵鈴木園子)	Koichiro Kuroda	Masaki Tsuji	September 29, 2018
916	19	"Kendo Tournament of Love and Mystery (Part One)"; Transliteration: "Koi to Suiri no Kendō Taikai (Zenpen)" (Japanese: 恋と推理の剣道大会（前編）)	Akira Yoshimura	Umesaburo Sagawa	October 6, 2018
917	20	"Kendo Tournament of Love and Mystery (Part Two)"; Transliteration: "Koi to Suiri no Kendō Taikai (Kōhen)" (Japanese: 恋と推理の剣道大会（後編）)	Hiroaki Takagi	Umesaburo Sagawa	October 13, 2018
918	21	"The Mini Patrol Car Police's Big Chase"; Transliteration: "Minipato Porisu Daitsuiseki" (Japanese: ミニパトポリス大追跡)	Yoshihiro Sugai	Yuko Okabe	October 27, 2018
919	22	"The High School Girl Trio's Secret Café (Part One)"; Transliteration: "Jēkē Torio Himitsu no Kafe (Zenpen)" (Japanese: JKトリオ秘密のカフェ（前編）)	Minoru Tozawa	Yasuyuki Honda	November 3, 2018
920	23	"The High School Girl Trio's Secret Café (Part Two)"; Transliteration: "Jēkē Torio Himitsu no Kafe (Kōhen)" (Japanese: JKトリオ秘密のカフェ（後編）)	Nobuharu Kamanaka	Yasuyuki Honda	November 10, 2018
921	24	"The Murderous Carpool"; Transliteration: "Satsui no Ainori" (Japanese: 殺意のあいのり)	Koichiro Kuroda	Kenjin Sata	November 17, 2018
922	25	"The Disappeared Detective Boys"; Transliteration: "Kieta Shōnen Tantei-dan" (Japanese: 消えた少年探偵団)	Akira Yoshimura	Junichi Miyashita	November 24, 2018
923	26	"A Day Without Conan"; Transliteration: "Conan no Inai Hi" (Japanese: コナンのいない日)	Hiroaki Takagi	Nobuo Ogizawa	December 1, 2018
924	27	"The Sun Sets Over Tangerine Fields"; Transliteration: "Mikan-batake ni Hi wa Shizumu" (Japanese: みかん畑に陽は沈む)	Minoru Tozawa	Yuki Notsuka	December 8, 2018
925	28	"The Heartfelt Strap (Part One)"; Transliteration: "Kokoro no Komotta Sutorappu (Zenpen)" (Japanese: 心のこもったストラップ（前編）)	Yoshihiro Yamaguchi	Yasuyuki Honda	December 15, 2018
926	29	"The Heartfelt Strap (Part Two)"; Transliteration: "Kokoro no Komotta Sutorappu (Kōhen)" (Japanese: 心のこもったストラップ（後編）)	Nobuharu Kamanaka Yasuichiro Yamamoto	Yasuyuki Honda Yasuichiro Yamamoto	December 22, 2018

=== Season 29 (2019) ===
No. overall	No. in season	Title	Directed by	Written by	Original release date
927	1	"The Scarlet School Trip (Bright Red Arc) ^{1 hr.}" Transliteration: "Kurenai no Shūgakuryokō" (Japanese: 紅の修学旅行)	Yasuichiro Yamamoto	N/A	January 5, 2019
928	2	"The Scarlet School Trip (Crimson Love Arc) ^{1 hr.}" Transliteration: "Kurenai no Shūgakuryokō" (Japanese: 紅の修学旅行)	Yasuichiro Yamamoto Minoru Tozawa Akira Yoshimura	N/A	January 12, 2019
929	3	"A Woman Standing by the Window (Part One)"; Transliteration: "Madobe ni tatazumu onna (Zenpen)" (Japanese: 窓辺にたたずむ女 (前編))	Kōichirō Kuroda	Nobuo Ōgizawa	February 2, 2019
930	4	"A Woman Standing by the Window (Part Two)"; Transliteration: "Madobe ni tatazumu onna (Kōhen)" (Japanese: 窓辺にたたずむ女 (後編))	Hiroaki Takagi	Nobuo Ōgizawa	February 9, 2019
931	5	"The Northern Kyushu Mystery Tour (Kokura Arc)"; Transliteration: "Kitakyūshū misuterītsuā (Kokura-hen)" (Japanese: 北九州ミステリーツア)	Akira Yoshimura	Toshimichi Ōkawa	February 16, 2019
932	6	"The Northern Kyushu Mystery Tour (Moji Arc)"; Transliteration: "Kitakyūshū misuterītsuā (Moji-hen)" (Japanese: 北九州ミステリーツア)	Takanori Yano	Toshimichi Ōkawa	February 23, 2019
933	7	"The Thoroughbred Kidnapping (Part One)"; Transliteration: "Sarabureddo yūkai jiken (Zenpen)" (Japanese: サラブレッド誘拐事件(前編))	Minoru Tozawa	Jun'ichi Miyashita	March 9, 2019
934	8	"The Thoroughbred Kidnapping (Part Two)"; Transliteration: "Sarabureddo yūkai jiken (Kōhen)" (Japanese: サラブレッド誘拐事件(後編))	Yujiro Abe	Jun'ichi Miyashita	March 16, 2019
935	9	"The Fortune Teller and the Three Customers"; Transliteration: "Uranaishi to san'nin no kyaku" (Japanese: 占い師と三人の客)	Kōichirō Kuroda	Nobuo Ōgizawa	March 23, 2019
936	10	"Intrigue at the Food Court"; Transliteration: "Fūdokōto no inbō" (Japanese: フードコートの陰謀)	Akira Yoshimura	Takahiro Ōkura	April 13, 2019
937	11	"The Killer Fist of Talos (Part One)"; Transliteration: "Kyojin Tarosu no Hissatsu Ken (Zenpen)" (Japanese: 巨人タロスの必殺拳 (前編))	Yorifusa Yamaguchi	Masaki Tsuji	April 20, 2019
938	12	"The Killer Fist of Talos (Part Two)"; Transliteration: "Kyojin Tarosu no Hissatsu Ken (Kōhen)" (Japanese: 巨人タロスの必殺拳 (後編))	Minoru Tozawa	Masaki Tsuji	April 27, 2019
939	13	"The Dangerous Fossil Finding Trip"; Transliteration: "Abunai Kaseki Saishū" (Japanese: 危ない化石採集)	Baron Horiuchi	Asami Ishikawa	May 4, 2019
940	14	"The Missing Girlfriend"; Transliteration: "Sugata o Keshita Koibito" (Japanese: 姿を消した恋人)	Kōichirō Kuroda Minoru Tozawa	Tatsurō Inamoto	May 11, 2019
941	15	"Find Maria-chan! (Part One)"; Transliteration: "Maria-chan o Sagase! (Zenpen)" (Japanese: マリアちゃんをさがせ！（前編）)	Akira Yoshimura	N/A	June 1, 2019
942	16	"Find Maria-chan! (Part Two)"; Transliteration: "Maria-chan o Sagase! (Kōhen)" (Japanese: マリアちゃんをさがせ！（後編）)	Minoru Tozawa	N/A	June 8, 2019
943	17	"Tokyo Barls Collection"; Transliteration: "Tōkyō Bāruzu Korekushon" (Japanese: 東京婆ールズコレクション)	Kōichirō Kuroda	Yoshio Urasawa	June 15, 2019
944	18	"The Cost of Likes (Part One)"; Transliteration: "Ii ne. No Daishō (Zenpen)" (Japanese: いいね。の代償（前編）)	Takanori Yano	Nobuo Ōgizawa	June 22, 2019
945	19	"The Cost of Likes (Part Two)"; Transliteration: "Ii ne. No Daishō (Kōhen)" (Japanese: いいね。の代償（後編）)	Baron Horiuchi	Nobuo Ōgizawa	June 29, 2019
946	20	"The Cursed Tears of Borgia (Part One)"; Transliteration: "Noroi no Hōseki Borujia no Namida (Zenpen)" (Japanese: 呪いの宝石ボルジアの涙（前編）)	Akira Yoshimura	Masaki Tsuji	July 13, 2019
947	21	"The Cursed Tears of Borgia, Part Two!"; Transliteration: "Noroi no Hōseki Borujia no Namida (Kōhen)" (Japanese: 呪いの宝石ボルジアの涙（後編）)	Minoru Tozawa	Masaki Tsuji	July 20, 2019
948	22	"The Man Crushed by a Dinosaur"; Transliteration: "Kyōryū ni Tsubusareta Otoko" (Japanese: 恐竜につぶされた男)	Tokugane Tanizawa	Kōshirō Mikami	July 27, 2019
949	23	"The Radio Questions and Concerns Show (Challenge Arc)"; Transliteration: "Rajio o Nayami Sōdan (Chōsen-hen)" (Japanese: ラジオお悩み相談（挑戦編）)	Takanori Yano	Nobuo Ōgizawa	August 3, 2019
950	24	"The Radio Questions and Concerns Show (Solution Arc)"; Transliteration: "Rajio o Nayami Sōdan (Nazo Toki-hen)" (Japanese: ラジオお悩み相談（謎解き編）)	Kōichirō Kuroda	Nobuo Ōgizawa	August 10, 2019
951	25	"The Whistling Bookstore 2"; Transliteration: "Kiteki no Kikoeru Kosho-ten Tsū" (Japanese: 汽笛の聞こえる古書店2)	Masahiro Takada	Yūki Nōtsuka	August 17, 2019
952	26	"The Unsolved Cocktail Case (Part One)"; Transliteration: "Meikyū Kakuteru (Zenpen)" (Japanese: 迷宮カクテル（前編）)	Minoru Tozawa	N/A	August 31, 2019
953	27	"The Unsolved Cocktail Case (Part Two)"; Transliteration: "Meikyū Kakuteru (Chūhen)" (Japanese: 迷宮カクテル（中編）)	Yōhei Shindō	N/A	September 7, 2019
954	28	"The Unsolved Cocktail Case (Part Three)"; Transliteration: "Meikyū Kakuteru (Kōhen)" (Japanese: 迷宮カクテル（後編）)	Akira Yoshimura	N/A	September 14, 2019
955	29	"The Secret of the Insect Man"; Transliteration: "Konchū Ningen no Himitsu" (Japanese: 昆虫人間のヒミツ)	Mayo Nozaki	Yoshio Urasawa	September 28, 2019
956	30	"The Mystery-Solving Water Taxi (Part One)"; Transliteration: "Nazo Toki Suijō Basu (Zenpen)" (Japanese: 謎解き水上バス（前編）)	Kōichirō Kuroda	Nobuo Ōgizawa	October 12, 2019
957	31	"The Mystery-Solving Water Taxi (Part Two)"; Transliteration: "Nazo Toki Suijō Basu (Kōhen)" (Japanese: 謎解き水上バス（後編）)	Masahiro Takada	Nobuo Ōgizawa	October 19, 2019
958	32	"The Poodle and the Shotgun (Part One)"; Transliteration: "Pūdoru to Sandanjū (Zenpen)" (Japanese: プードルと散弾銃（前編）)	Minoru Tozawa	Toshimichi Ōkawa	November 9, 2019
959	33	"The Poodle and the Shotgun (Part Two)"; Transliteration: "Pūdoru to Sandanjū (Kōhen)" (Japanese: プードルと散弾銃（後編）)	Yōhei Shindō	Toshimichi Ōkawa	November 16, 2019

=== Season 30 (2019–21) ===
No. overall	No. in season	Title	Directed by	Written by	Original release date	English release date
960	1	"Miss Lonely and the Detective Boys"; Transliteration: "Mizu Ronrī to Tantei-dan" (Japanese: 未亡人と探偵団)	Kōichirō Kuroda	Yūki Nōtsuka	November 23, 2019	–
961	2	"The Glamping Mystery"; Transliteration: "Guranpingu Kai Jiken" (Japanese: グランピング怪事件)	Mayo Nozaki	Akatsuki Yamatoya	November 30, 2019	–
962	3	"Mori Kogoro's Grand Lecture (Part One)"; Transliteration: "Mōri Kogorō Dai Kōenkai (Zenpen)" (Japanese: 毛利小五郎大講演会（前編）)	Masahiro Takada	Jun'ichi Miyashita	December 7, 2019	–
963	4	"Mori Kogoro's Grand Lecture (Part Two)"; Transliteration: "Mōri Kogorō Dai Kōenkai (Chūhen)" (Japanese: 毛利小五郎大講演会（中編）)	Minoru Tozawa	Jun'ichi Miyashita	December 14, 2019	–
964	5	"Mori Kogoro's Grand Lecture (Part Three)"; Transliteration: "Mōri Kogorō Dai Kōenkai (Kōhen)" (Japanese: 毛利小五郎大講演会（後編）)	Akira Yoshimura Kōichirō Kuroda	Jun'ichi Miyashita	December 21, 2019	–
965	6	"Kaiju Gomera VS Kamen Yaiba (Prologue)"; Transliteration: "Dai Kaijū Gomera Bāsasu Kamen Yaibā (Jo)" (Japanese: 大怪獣ゴメラvs仮面ヤイバー（序）)	Hiroaki Takagi	Takahiro Ōkura	January 4, 2020	February 8, 2023
966	7	"Kaiju Gomera VS Kamen Yaiba (Interlude)"; Transliteration: "Dai Kaijū Gomera Bāsasu Kamen Yaibā (Ha)" (Japanese: 大怪獣ゴメラvs仮面ヤイバー（破）)	Nobuharu Kamanaka	Takahiro Ōkura	January 11, 2020	February 8, 2023
967	8	"Kaiju Gomera VS Kamen Yaiba (Climax)"; Transliteration: "Dai Kaijū Gomera Bāsasu Kamen Yaibā (Kyū)" (Japanese: 大怪獣ゴメラvs仮面ヤイバー（急）)	Minoru Tozawa	Takahiro Ōkura	January 18, 2020	February 8, 2023
968	9	"Kaiju Gomera VS Kamen Yaiba (Finale)"; Transliteration: "Dai Kaijū Gomera Bāsasu Kamen Yaibā (Ketsu)" (Japanese: 大怪獣ゴメラvs仮面ヤイバー（結）)	Yasuichirō Yamamoto	Takahiro Ōkura	January 25, 2020	February 8, 2023
969	10	"The Young Kaga Lady's Mystery Tour (Part One)"; Transliteration: "Kaga Reijō Misuterī Tsuā (Zenpen)" (Japanese: 加賀令嬢ミステリーツアー（前編）)	Masahiro Takada	Yūki Nōtsuka	February 15, 2020	February 8, 2023
970	11	"The Young Kaga Lady's Mystery Tour (Part Two)"; Transliteration: "Kaga Reijō Misuterī Tsuā (Kōhen)" (Japanese: 加賀令嬢ミステリーツアー（後編）)	Kōichirō Kuroda	Yūki Nōtsuka	February 22, 2020	February 8, 2023
971	12	"MPD Transportation Department (Part One)"; Transliteration: "Tāgetto wa Keishichō Kōtsūbu (Ichi)" (Japanese: 標的は警視庁交通部（一）)	Minoru Tozawa	N/A	March 7, 2020	February 8, 2023
972	13	"MPD Transportation Department (Part Two)"; Transliteration: "Tāgetto wa Keishichō Kōtsūbu (Ni)" (Japanese: 標的は警視庁交通部（二）)	Akira Yoshimura	N/A	March 14, 2020	February 8, 2023
973	14	"MPD Transportation Department (Part Three)"; Transliteration: "Tāgetto wa Keishichō Kōtsūbu (San)" (Japanese: 標的は警視庁交通部（三）)	Nobuharu Kamanaka	N/A	March 21, 2020	February 8, 2023
974	15	"MPD Transportation Department (Part Four)"; Transliteration: "Tāgetto wa Keishichō Kōtsūbu (Yon)" (Japanese: 標的は警視庁交通部（四）)	Yorifusa Yamaguchi	N/A	March 28, 2020	February 8, 2023
975	16	"The Secret of the Search for His Wife"; Transliteration: "Tsuma Sagashi no Himitsu" (Japanese: 妻探しの秘密)	Kōichirō Kuroda	Asami Ishikawa	July 4, 2020	February 15, 2023
976	17	"Follow Them! Detective Taxi"; Transliteration: "Tsuiseki! Tantei Takushī" (Japanese: 追跡！探偵タクシー)	Minoru Tozawa	Yoshio Urasawa	July 18, 2020	February 15, 2023
977	18	"The Broken Fishbowl"; Transliteration: "Wareta Kingyobachi" (Japanese: 割れた金魚鉢)	Akira Yoshimura	Kōshirō Mikami	August 1, 2020	February 15, 2023
978	19	"The Case On the Opposite Shore"; Transliteration: "Taigan no Jiken" (Japanese: 対岸の事件)	Yasuichirō Yamamoto Yorifusa Yamaguchi	Akatsuki Yamatoya	August 15, 2020	February 15, 2023
979	20	"Leading a Detective Around By the Nose"; Transliteration: "Tantei o Hikizurimawasu" (Japanese: 探偵を引きずり回す)	Hiroaki Takagi	Nobuo Ōgizawa	August 29, 2020	February 15, 2023
980	21	"An Encouragement of the Perfect Crime"; Transliteration: "Kanzen Hanzai no Susume" (Japanese: 完全犯罪のススメ)	Kōichirō Kuroda	Akatsuki Yamatoya	September 5, 2020	February 15, 2023
981	22	"Welcome to Bocchan Restaurant (Part One)"; Transliteration: "Botchantei e Yōkoso (Zenpen)" (Japanese: 坊っちゃん亭へようこそ（前編）)	Mayo Nozaki	Nobuo Ōgizawa	September 19, 2020	February 15, 2023
982	23	"Welcome to Bocchan Restaurant (Part Two)"; Transliteration: "Botchantei e Yōkoso (Kōhen)" (Japanese: 坊っちゃん亭へようこそ（後編）)	Minoru Tozawa	Nobuo Ōgizawa	September 26, 2020	February 15, 2023
983	24	"Kid vs. Komei the Targeted Lips (Part One)"; Transliteration: "Kiddo Bāsasu Kōmei Nerawareta Kuchibiru (Zenpen)" (Japanese: キッドＶＳ高明 狙われた唇（前編）)	Nobuharu Kamanaka	N/A	October 3, 2020	February 15, 2023
984	25	"Kid vs. Komei: The Targeted Lips (Part Two)"; Transliteration: "Kiddo Bāsasu Kōmei Nerawareta Kuchibiru (Kōhen)" (Japanese: キッドＶＳ高明 狙われた唇（後編）)	Nobuharu Kamanaka	N/A	October 10, 2020	February 15, 2023
985	26	"The Two Faces (Part One)"; Transliteration: "Futatsu no Sugao (Zenpen)" (Japanese: 二つの素顔（前編）)	Masahiro Takada	Akatsuki Yamatoya	October 24, 2020	March 15, 2023
986	27	"The Two Faces (Part Two)"; Transliteration: "Futatsu no Sugao (Kōhen)" (Japanese: 二つの素顔（後編）)	Minoru Tozawa	Akatsuki Yamatoya	October 31, 2020	March 15, 2023
987	28	"The Company Dissolution Party" (Note: Party written as パーティ on the website but written as パーティー in the episode.); Transliteration: "Kaisha Kaisan Pāti" (Japanese: 会社解散パーティ)	Kōichirō Kuroda	Jun'ichi Iioka Chisato Matsuda	November 7, 2020	March 15, 2023
988	29	"The Feuding Girls"; Transliteration: "Igamiau Otome-tachi" (Japanese: いがみ合う乙女達)	Akira Yoshimura	Kōshirō Mikami	November 14, 2020	March 15, 2023
989	30	"The Case of Ayumi's Illustrated Diary"; Transliteration: "Ayumi no Enikki Jikenbo" (Japanese: 歩美の絵日記事件簿)	Yasuichirō Yamamoto	Akatsuki Yamatoya	December 5, 2020	March 15, 2023
990	31	"The Automatic Tragedy (Part One)"; Transliteration: "Ōtomatikku Higeki (Zenpen)" (Japanese: オートマティック悲劇（前編）)	Masahiro Takada	Nobuo Ōgizawa	December 12, 2020	March 15, 2023
991	32	"The Automatic Tragedy (Part Two)"; Transliteration: "Ōtomatikku Higeki (Kōhen)" (Japanese: オートマティック悲劇（後編）)	Hiroaki Takagi	Nobuo Ōgizawa	December 19, 2020	March 15, 2023
992	33	"Murder at the Townhouse Café" (Note: Townhouse written as 町屋 on the website but written as 町家 in the episode.); Transliteration: "Machiya Kafe de no Jiken" (Japanese: 町屋カフェでの事件)	Kōichirō Kuroda	Akatsuki Yamatoya	December 26, 2020	March 15, 2023
993	34	"Kyogoku Makoto the Understudy (Part One)"; Transliteration: "Daiyaku Kyōgoku Makoto (Zenpen)" (Japanese: 代役・京極真（前編）)	Minoru Tozawa	N/A	January 9, 2021	March 15, 2023
994	35	"Kyogoku Makoto the Understudy (Part Two)"; Transliteration: "Daiyaku Kyōgoku Makoto (Chūhen)" (Japanese: 代役・京極真（中編）)	Akira Yoshimura	N/A	January 16, 2021	March 15, 2023
995	36	"Kyogoku Makoto the Understudy (Part Three)"; Transliteration: "Daiyaku Kyōgoku Makoto (Kōhen)" (Japanese: 代役・京極真（後編）)	Mayo Nozaki	N/A	January 23, 2021	March 15, 2023
996	37	"The Skilled Hawk Hides His Crimes"; Transliteration: "Nō Aru Taka wa Tsumi o Kakusu" (Japanese: 能ある鷹は罪を隠す)	Minoru Tozawa	Hiro Masaki	January 30, 2021	March 15, 2023
997	38	"Intrigue at Smile Village"; Transliteration: "Sumairu no Sato no Inbō" (Japanese: スマイルの里の陰謀)	Masahiro Takada	Yoshio Urasawa	February 13, 2021	March 15, 2023
998	39	"The Frying Pan of Hatred"; Transliteration: "Nikushimi no Furaipan" (Japanese: 憎しみのフライパン)	Kōichirō Kuroda	Kōshirō Mikami	February 20, 2021	March 15, 2023
999	40	"Troublesome Kindness"; Transliteration: "Meiwaku na Shinsetsushin" (Japanese: 迷惑な親切心)	Ryūta Kawahara	Jun'ichi Iioka Chisato Matsuda	February 27, 2021	March 15, 2023

== Home media release ==
The Region 2 DVD compilations of the Detective Conan anime are released by Shogakukan and grouped by parts.

Shogakukan (Japan, Region 2 DVD)
Volume		Episodes^{Jp.}	Release date	Ref.
Part 16	Volume 1	461, 466–468	January 25, 2008	
Part 16	Volume 2	469–471, 474	February 22, 2008	
Part 16	Volume 3	472–473, 475, 478	March 28, 2008	
Part 16	Volume 4	476–477, 480, 483	April 25, 2008	
Part 16	Volume 5	479	May 23, 2008	
Part 16	Volume 6	481–482, 484–485	June 27, 2008	
Part 16	Volume 7	487–488	July 25, 2008	
Part 16	Volume 8	489–490	August 22, 2008	
Part 17	Volume 1	486, 491–493	September 26, 2008	
Part 17	Volume 2	494–497	October 24, 2008	
Part 17	Volume 3	498–501	January 1, 2009	
Part 17	Volume 4	502–504, 512	February 27, 2009	
Part 17	Volume 5	505–508	March 27, 2009	
Part 17	Volume 6	509–511, 520	April 24, 2009	
Part 17	Volume 7	513–515	May 22, 2009	
Part 17	Volume 8	516–517, 526	June 26, 2009	
Part 17	Volume 9	518–519, 521	July 24, 2009	
Part 17	Volume 10	522–523, 527	August 28, 2009	
Part 18	Volume 1	524–525, 528–529	October 23, 2009	
Part 18	Volume 2	530–533	February 26, 2010	
Part 18	Volume 3	534–536, 539	March 26, 2010	
Part 18	Volume 4	537–538, 540–541	April 23, 2010	
Part 18	Volume 5	542–544, 553	May 28, 2010	
Part 18	Volume 6	545–548	June 25, 2010	
Part 18	Volume 7	549–552	July 23, 2010	
Part 18	Volume 8	554–557	August 27, 2010	
Part 18	Volume 9	558–561	September 24, 2010	
Part 18	Volume 10	562–565	October 22, 2010	
Part 19	Volume 1	566–569	January 28, 2011	
Part 19	Volume 2	570–572,577	February 25, 2011	
Part 19	Volume 3	573–576	April 8, 2011	
Part 19	Volume 4	578–581	April 22, 2011	
Part 19	Volume 5	582–585	May 27, 2011	
Part 19	Volume 6	586–588, 591	June 24, 2011	
Part 19	Volume 7	589–590, 592–593	July 22, 2011	
Part 19	Volume 8	594–596, 599	August 26, 2011	
Part 19	Volume 9	597–598, 600–601	September 23, 2011	
Part 19	Volume 10	602–605	October 28, 2011	
Part 20	Volume 1	606–609	January 27, 2012	
Part 20	Volume 2	610–613	February 24, 2012	
Part 20	Volume 3	614–617	March 23, 2012	
Part 20	Volume 4	618–621	April 27, 2012	
Part 20	Volume 5	622–624, 631	May 25, 2012	
Part 20	Volume 6	625–628	June 26, 2012	
Part 20	Volume 7	629–630, 632–633	July 27, 2012	
Part 20	Volume 8	634–637	August 24, 2012	
Part 20	Volume 9	638-641	September 28, 2012	
Part 20	Volume 10	642–645	October 26, 2012	
Part 21	Volume 1	646–647, 651	February 22, 2013	
Part 21	Volume 2	648–650, 658	March 22, 2013	
Part 21	Volume 3	652–655	April 26, 2013	
Part 21	Volume 4	656–657, 659–660	May 24, 2013	
Part 21	Volume 5	661–664	June 21, 2013	
Part 21	Volume 6	665–668	July 26, 2013	
Part 21	Volume 7	669–670, 677, 680	August 23, 2013	
Part 21	Volume 8	671–674	September 27, 2013	
Part 21	Volume 9	675–676, 678–679	October 25, 2013	
Part 22	Volume 1	681-683, 686	January 24, 2014	
Part 22	Volume 2	684–688	February 21, 2014	
Part 22	Volume 3	689–691, 694	March 21, 2014	
Part 22	Volume 4	692–693, 695–696	April 25, 2014	
Part 22	Volume 5	697–700	May 23, 2014	
Part 22	Volume 6	701–704	June 20, 2014	
Part 22	Volume 7	705–708	July 25, 2014	
Part 22	Volume 8	709–711, 718	August 22, 2014	
Part 22	Volume 9	712–715	October 24, 2014	
Part 23	Volume 1	716-717, 719, 726	March 27, 2015	
Part 23	Volume 2	720-723	May 22, 2015	
Part 23	Volume 3	724-725, 727-728	June 26, 2015	
Part 23	Volume 4	729-732	July 24, 2015	
Part 23	Volume 5	733-735	August 28, 2015	
Part 23	Volume 6	736-739	September 29, 2015	
Part 24	Volume 1	740-743	January 22, 2016	
Part 24	Volume 2	744-747	February 22, 2016	
Part 24	Volume 3	748-750, 753	March 25, 2016	
Part 24	Volume 4	751-752, 757-758	April 22, 2016	
Part 24	Volume 5	754-756, 767	May 27, 2016	
Part 24	Volume 6	759-762	June 24, 2016	
Part 24	Volume 7	765-766, 768	July 22, 2016	
Part 24	Volume 8	763-764, 769, 774	August 26, 2016	
Part 24	Volume 9	770-773	September 23, 2016	
Part 24	Volume 10	775-778	November 25, 2016	
Part 25	Volume 1	779-783	January 27, 2017	
Part 25	Volume 2	784-786, 789	February 24, 2017	
Part 25	Volume 3	787-788, 790-791	March 24, 2017	
Part 25	Volume 4	792-795	April 21, 2017	
Part 25	Volume 5	796-799	May 26, 2017	
Part 25	Volume 6	800-803	June 23, 2017	
Part 25	Volume 7	804-805	July 21, 2017	
Part 25	Volume 8	806-809	August 25, 2017	
Part 25	Volume 9	810-813	September 22, 2017	
Part 25	Volume 10	814-817	November 24, 2017	
Part 26	Volume 1	818-821	January 26, 2019	
Part 26	Volume 2	822-825	February 23, 2019	
Part 26	Volume 3	826-829	March 23, 2019	
Part 26	Volume 4	830-833	April 27, 2019	
Part 26	Volume 5	834-837	May 25, 2019	
Part 26	Volume 6	838-841	June 22, 2019	
Part 26	Volume 7	842-844, 855	July 27, 2019	
Part 26	Volume 8	845-848	August 24, 2019	
Part 26	Volume 9	849-852	September 21, 2019	
Part 26	Volume 10	853-856, 859	November 23, 2019	
Part 27	Volume 1	857-858, 860, 865	January 25, 2019	
Part 27	Volume 2	861-864	February 22, 2019	
Part 27	Volume 3	866-867, 869-870	March 22, 2019	
Part 27	Volume 4	871-874	April 26, 2019	
Part 27	Volume 5	868, 875-877	May 24, 2019	
Part 27	Volume 6	878-879, 881-882	June 21, 2019	
Part 27	Volume 7	883-886	July 26, 2019	
Part 27	Volume 8	887-890	August 23, 2019	
Part 27	Volume 9	891-892, 894-895	September 20, 2019	
Part 27	Volume 10	880, 893, 896-897	November 22, 2019	
Part 28	Volume 1	898-900, 903	February 28, 2020	
Part 28	Volume 2	901-902, 905-906	March 27, 2020	
Part 28	Volume 3	904, 907-908, 911	April 24, 2020	
Part 28	Volume 4	909-910, 913-914	May 29, 2020	
Part 28	Volume 5	912, 915-917	June 26, 2020	
Part 28	Volume 6	918-921	July 24, 2020	
Part 28	Volume 7	922-924, 935	August 28, 2020	
Part 28	Volume 8	925-926, 929-930	September 25, 2020	
Part 29	Volume 1	927-928	February 26, 2021	
Part 29	Volume 2	931-934	March 26, 2021	
Part 29	Volume 3	936-939	April 23, 2021	
Part 29	Volume 4	940-943	May 28, 2021	
Part 29	Volume 5	944-947	June 25, 2021	
Part 29	Volume 6	948-951	July 23, 2021	
Part 29	Volume 7	952-955	August 27, 2021	
Part 29	Volume 8	956-959	September 24, 2021	
Part 30	Volume 1	960–961, 969–970	February 25, 2022	
Part 30	Volume 2	962–964, 975	March 25, 2022	
Part 30	Volume 3	965–968	April 22, 2022	
Part 30	Volume 4	971–974	May 27, 2022	
Part 30	Volume 5	976–979	June 24, 2022	
Part 30	Volume 6	980–982, 987	July 22, 2022	
Part 30	Volume 7	983–986	August 26, 2022	
Part 30	Volume 8	988–991	September 23, 2022	
Part 30	Volume 9	992–995	October 28, 2022	
Part 30	Volume 10	996–999	November 25, 2022	

== Notes ==
- ^Jp. The episode's numbering as followed in Japan
- ^1 hr. episodes were aired as a single hour long episode in Japan
- ^2 hrs. The episodes were aired as a single two-hour long episode in Japan
