= Holmes' Revelation =

217th story arc in the Case Closed series

The 71st tankōbon of Case Closed released by Shogakukan in Japan on February 18, 2011 where the individual chapters of the arc are encapsulated

Holmes' Revelation (Japanese: ホームズの黙示録, Hepburn: Holmes no Mokushiroku) is the 217th story arc of the Japanese manga series Case Closed, known as Meitantei Conan (名探偵コナン, lit. Great Detective Conan, officially translated as Detective Conan) in Japan. The arc was published in Shogakukan's Weekly Shōnen Sunday magazine between August and October 2010 in issues 36 to 46 and consisted of 10 chapters. The individual chapters were then collected into tankōbon volumes 71 and 72 which were released in Japan on February 18, 2011, and June 17, 2011, respectively. The majority were encapsulated into the 71st volume which became the 21st best selling manga in the first half of 2011.

The Case Closed anime adapted the arc into episodes 616–621 and was broadcast on Nippon Television Network System between May 21, 2011, and June 25, 2011. The episodes were the top six watched anime during its run. The arc follows Shinichi Kudo as he visits London and becomes involved in a bombing case. In the beginning of the series, Shinichi was poisoned and turned into a child. Since then, he had been using the identity Conan Edogawa whilst keeping his true identity a secret.

Viz Media localized and published the two volumes on July 9, 2019 and October 8, 2019 as The Game Is Afoot and In the Cards.

== Plot ==
Conan and his caretakers, Ran Mori and Kogoro Mori, are given a free trip to London after finding a cat that belongs to Diana Kingstone, a rich British woman. For the trip, Conan is given two pills by Ai Haibara; the pills will temporarily suppress the poison which turned him into a child allowing him to use his teenage identity, Shinichi Kudo, to bypass airport security. After the medicine wears off, Conan rendezvous with Ran and Kogoro to visit the Sherlock Holmes Museum at 221B Baker Street. There, Ran phones Shinichi (Conan using his voice-changing bowtie) and is upset about his apathy. Shortly after, Conan overhears a child named Apollo Glass who is searching for Holmes. Posing as Holmes' apprentice, Conan befriends Apollo who reveals a man has given him a list of riddles which needs to be solved in return for sparing someone's life. Meanwhile, Ran is walking by the Statue of Sherlock Holmes where she meets Minerva Glass, a professional tennis player and Apollo's elder sister; Minerva tells Ran to give up on love relating it to the tennis mantra "Love is Zero". Ran decides to call Shinichi; during the conversation, the latter accidentally reveals he is by Big Ben. Ran corners Conan forcing him to take the medicine for the return trip to protect his identity. Believing that Shinichi was hiding from her, Ran is hurt and repeats Minerva's words. In return Shinichi confesses his love for her and rebukes Minerva's statement by exclaiming that everything starts from zero.

The next day, the man distributing the riddles in London is identified as Sabara Hades, an international serial bomber. Conan begins decoding the riddles in order: "A rolling bell rises me" refers to Big Ben; "My portion is like a chilled boiled egg like a corpse," leads them to City Hall where dolls engraved with Mazarin Stone are found. Referring to The Adventure of the Mazarin Stone, the group beheads the doll where they discover the letter T; "I finished up with a whole pickle," leads them to 30 St Mary Axe where they find scratched up pens labeled as Dancing Men. As in The Adventure of the Dancing Men, matching the top and bottom caps to reveal the letter N; "It rings again for my hatred" leads them to cross the Westminster Bridge towards Big Ben. On the bridge, they find a drain engraved with Valley of Fear. Referring to The Valley of Fear, they find a drain cover with the letter A in the river; "Now I remember to ask a cake to celebrate in advance" leads them to St Bride's Church where they find envelopes entitled A Scandal in Bohemia. Soaking the envelope in water reveals the letter S; "I'm a long nosed wizard in a castle" leads them to Elephant & Castle tube station where they find a man carrying a suitcase with the word identity on it. Referring to A Case of Identity, they find the letter U on the inside of the man's pants; "It tells me to finish everything piercing a white back with two swords" refers to the logo of a local porcelain store which displays an ornament with strings and bells attached on the end. Referring to A Study in Scarlet, they locate a red string with the letter R. Rearranging the letters results in Saturn, a reference to Saturday. Connecting the riddle's locations on a map forms a tennis racquet referencing the Wimbledon championships.

Conan enters the All England Lawn Tennis and Croquet Club during the Wimbledon finals. Minerva has been serving "help" in braille into the court. Conan calls out to her revealing he understood her message. In response, Minerva serves more messages revealing Hades intends to kill her mother with a bomb when the match ends. Conan deduces Hades is directly opposite of Minerva's mother, as he intends to record her death, and is able to locate him. Conan coincidentally finds his parents, Yusaku Kudo and Yukiko Kudo, who assists him in apprehending Hades; Conan is then given another pill, by his parents, to bypass airport security to return home. With Hades incarcerated, Minerva is able to focus and win her match. As Conan and friends prepare to return home, Ran converses with Minerva and repeats Shinichi's words. Minerva, having made up with her lover, acknowledges that everything starts from love.

== Production and release ==
Characters designed by Gosho Aoyama in this arc. From left to right is Juno Glass, Ares Ashley, Apollo Glass, and Minerva Glass. Minerva's character was based on Steffi Graf.

In 2003, the creator of the Case Closed series, Gosho Aoyama, had stated he would draw a story arc taking place in London. To this end, he traveled to London and visited the sites that would appear in the story arc; for sites he had not visited, he used Google Maps. During his trip, Aoyama took special note of a phone booth near Big Ben and a drain pipe, engraved with the words "Valley of Fear", on the Westminster Bridge; these two aspects were used in the story. While creating the story, Aoyama expressed difficulty incorporating English in the text. He also revealed Minerva Glass, a fictional tennis player in the story, was based on professional tennis player Steffi Graf and the scene where Conan calls out to Minerva during her tennis match was inspired by an event during the 1996 Wimbledon Championships where a fan jokingly shouted his proposal to Graf during her semi-finals match. For Shinichi's confession to Ran, Aoyama created the scene with Sherlock Holmes' poor ability with relationships and the phrase Yakkai na Nanjiken (厄介な難事件, lit. "A troublesome and difficult case") in mind.

The arc was published in Shogakukan's Weekly Shōnen Sunday magazine between August and October 2010 from issues 36 to 46 and consisted of 10 chapters. The individual chapters were then collected into tankōbon volumes 71 and 72 which were released in Japan on February 18, 2011, and June 17, 2011, respectively.

== Anime adaptation ==
The Holmes no Mokushiroku story arc was aired on the Case Closed anime series as episodes 616–621 and aired between May 21, 2011, and June 25, 2011, on Nippon Television Network System. The episodes were later encapsulated into two DVD volumes released on March 23, 2012, and April 27, 2012. The opening theme music for the episodes were "Don't Wanna Lie" by B'z and the ending theme was Tsukiyo no Itazura no Mahō (月夜の悪戯の魔法, lit. "Mischievous Magic on the Moonlit Night") by Breakerz. Episodes 616–617 were directed by Takaomi Kanasaki (Note: 金﨑貴臣, Takaomi Kanasaki), 618–619 by Shigenori Kageyama (Note: 影山楙倫, Kageyama Shigenori), 620–621 by Seiki Taichū (Note: 大宙征基, Taichū Seiki). Each episode had different producers; in episode order, the six producers were: Minoru Tozawa (Note: 戸澤稔, Tozawa Minoru), Shigeru Yamazaki (Note: 山﨑茂, Yamazaki Shigeru), Nobuharu Kamanaka (Note: 鎌仲史陽, Kamanaka Nobuharu), Tomomi Ikeda (Note: 池田智美, Ikeda Tomomi) Kōichirō Kuroda (Note: 黒田晃一郎, Kuroda Kōichirō) and Akira Yoshimura (Note: 吉村あきら, Yoshimura Akira). The guest characters, Diana Kingstone (Note: ダイアナ・キングストン, Daiana Kingusuton), Minerva Glass (Note: ミネルバ・グラス, Mineruba Gurasu), Apollo Glass (Note: アポロ・グラス, Aporo Gurasu), Juno Glass (Note: ジュノ・グラス, Juno Gurasu), Sabara Hades (Note: ハーデス・サバラ, Hādesu Sabara) and Ares Ashley (Note: アレス・アシュレイ, Aresu Ashurei) were voiced by Rachel Walzer (Note: レイチェル・ワルザー, Reicheru Waruzā), Rumiko Varnes (Note: マーク チネリー, Rumiko Bānzu), Motoko Kumai, Ciari Christelle (Note: マーク チネリー, Christelle Ciara), Masashi Sugawara, and Osamu Hosoi respectively.

== Reception ==
The majority of the arc was collected into volume 71, which sold 262,116 copies in its release week. It reached 526,693 in May 2011 and was the 21st top-selling manga between November 22, 2010, and May 22, 2011. The anime episodes of the story arc ranked in the top six anime watched during their respective week of broadcast. The two DVD volumes containing the episodes both appeared on Oricon's charts.

Manga-News reviewed the story arc positively. They praised several aspects of the story arc: the plot and narration for being captivating and for including famous London settings, references to Sherlock Holmes, and the Wimbledon competition; the characterization for the antagonist Sabara Hades; and the romance between Shinichi and Ran which was described as an event readers had been waiting for. Manga-News however criticized how Shinichi and Ran's interaction were covered by flashbacks instead of happening chronologically. AnimeLand reviewed volume 71 and called it the best since volume 59.
