= Case Closed season 21 =

2012 season of anime television series

Case Closed
- Season 21
- The cover of the first DVD compilation for season twenty-one of Detective Conan released by Shogakukan
- No. of episodes: 35

Release
- Original network: NNS (ytv)
- Original release: February 18 – December 15, 2012

Season chronology
- ← Previous; Season 20 Next → Season 22

The twenty-first season of the Case Closed anime was directed by Kōjin Ochi (until episode 666, and then 678–679) and Yasuichiro Yamamoto (since episode 667, except 678–679) and produced by TMS Entertainment and Yomiuri Telecasting Corporation. The series is based on Gosho Aoyama's Case Closed manga series. In Japan, the series is titled Detective Conan (名探偵コナン, Meitantei Conan) but was changed due to legal issues with the title Detective Conan. The series focuses on the adventures of teenage detective Shinichi Kudo who was turned into a child by a poison called APTX 4869, but continues working as a detective under the alias Conan Edogawa.

The episodes use five pieces of theme music: two opening and three ending themes. The first opening theme is "Miss Mystery" by Breakerz up until episode 666. The second opening theme is Kimi no Namida ni Kon'nani Koishiteru (君の涙にこんなに恋してる, lit. So Much Love With Your Tears) by Natsuiro starting from episode 667. The first ending theme is Kanashimi hodo Kyō no Yūhi Kirei dane (悲しみほど 今日の夕陽きれいだね, lit. "Compared With the Sadness, Today's Sunset Is More Beautiful") by grram and is used up to episode 653. The second ending theme is "Overwrite" (オーバーライト, Ōbāraito), and by Breakerz between episode 654 and 666. The third ending theme is Koi ni Koishite (恋に恋して, lit. "In Love With Love") by Mai Kuraki starting from episode 667.

The season initially ran from February 18, 2012, through December 15, 2012, on Nippon Television Network System in Japan. The season was later collected and released in nine DVD compilations by Shogakukan between February 22, 2013, and October 25, 2013, in Japan.

== Episode list ==
No.	No. in season	Title	Directed by	Written by	Original air date
646	1	"The Deduction Showdown at the Haunted Hotel (Part 1)"; Transliteration: "Yūrei Hoteru no Suiri Taiketsu (Zenpen)" (Japanese: 幽霊ホテルの推理対決（前編）)	Akira Yoshimura	N/A	February 18, 2012
Ran, Sonoko, and Conan head to a hotel for a cake buffet. On the way there, a molester is stopped by Masumi Sera, who befriends the group. At the hotel, Teigu Usumi killed after being thrown off the hotel while fashioned as a suicide. The police arrive and reveal the annex where the victim vandalized the security camera is the only blind spot in the hotel and most likely the murder location. There, they discover a wheelchair attached to a long fishing line.
647	2	"The Deduction Showdown at the Haunted Hotel (Part 2)"; Transliteration: "Yūrei Hoteru no Suiri Taiketsu (Kōhen)" (Japanese: 幽霊ホテルの推理対決（後編）)	Shigeru Yamazaki	N/A	February 25, 2012
After investigating the room, Masumi declares the culprit to be Toshiko Hirukawa as she lied about the elevator usage to Conan. She reveals Hirukawa got Usumi drunk, placed him on the wheelchair, and used a system of strings connected to the elevator to throw him out the window. However, reacting the scene fails, until Conan voices his deductions over the phone as Shinichi revealing the paint cans were placed out of the window to tilt the wheelchair. Hirikawa confesses and reveals her father begged Usumi to apologize for scamming her mother but was refused. Afterwards, her father committed suicide after her mother died from shock. In the aftermath, Usumi's hidden bank account was found and the transactions to it allowed the police to apprehend the scam group. Masumi later enrolls into Ran and Sonoko's classroom.
648	3	"The Case of the Besieged Detective Agency (Outbreak)"; Transliteration: "Tantei Jimusho Rōjō Jiken (Boppatsu)" (Japanese: 探偵事務所籠城事件（勃発）)	Koichiro Kuroda	N/A	March 3, 2012
Masumi asks Ran if she can come over to talk to Conan. Once there, she learns Conan is at Agasa's with the Detective Boys and the fact Conan is with Kogoro on every case. They are soon interrupted when a gunman strapped with bombs and three hostages are brought into the agency. The gunman, Isao Sawaguri, demands Kogoro to determine which of his three hostages killed his sister. Conan calls Ran to ask who she was spotted walking with. Masumi answers and pretends to end the call, allowing Conan to eavesdrop on the situation. Conan learns the case of Sawaguri's sister, Miku Sawaguri, was concluded to be suicide when she was found with her wrist slit inside her locked ryokan room. Agasa and the Detective Boys leave to interview the local neighborhood association who were at the ryokan during Miku's death. Conan gradually learns more about the case from information spoken by Sawaguri, the media, and the Detective Boys. Sawaguri then realizes Ran's cellphone is still connected and prepares to shoot Sera until Conan speaks with his voice changing bow-tie as Shinichi Kudo.
649	4	"The Case of the Besieged Detective Agency (Sniping)"; Transliteration: "Tantei Jimusho Rōjō Jiken (Sogeki)" (Japanese: 探偵事務所籠城事件（狙撃）)	Minoru Tozawa	N/A	March 10, 2012
Sawaguri, pleased to have another detective to assist in the case, obeys his requests to take pictures of the hostages' books which were autographed by Miku. During the course of the investigation, the authorities lose the chance to snipe Sawaguri after Ran closes the curtain as she believes Shinichi can find a solution to prevent any deaths. Miku's blog post reveals her last three visitors were from an elephant, a fox, and a rat. Conan explains the animals were based on the hostages' professions: The elephant is Sumika Nihei, due to her husband's seal designs which are similar to an elephant's tusk; Shinobu Yuchi is the fox since she is a baker and her food is colored like a fox's coat; and the rat is Tamami Mitsui whom is a stonemasonry which is gray like a rat's coat. In response, Sawaguri prepares to kill Mitsui.
650	5	"The Case of the Besieged Detective Agency (Release)"; Transliteration: "Tantei Jimusho Rōjō Jiken (Kaihō)" (Japanese: 探偵事務所籠城事件（解放）)	Tomomi Ikeda	N/A	March 17, 2012
Conan declares Mitsui is innocent since she was witnessed leaving Miku's room; Sawaguri inferred the culprit crossed over from the balcony and left by his room. As for Miku's death, Conan explains she was mimicking the suicide of the main character in her book. Sawaguri becomes distraught as a result and is taken in by the authorities. Later, Conan reveals his previous deduction was a bluff and that Miku was murdered by Yuchi, due to the fact Mitsui left the room with Yuchi's slippers revealing Yuchi was still in Miku's room after she left. As evidence, Yuchi's book reveals it had been sandpapered to clean off Miku's blood. Yuchi confesses and reveals Miku took all the credit on the book they collaborated on motivating her for revenge.
651	6	"Conan vs. Heiji: Deduction Battle Between the Detectives of the East and West^{1 hr.}" Transliteration: "Conan vs Heiji Tōzai Tantei Suiri Shōbu" (Japanese: コナンvs平次 東西探偵推理勝負)	Akira Yoshimura Shigeru Yamazaki	N/A	March 24, 2012 (Note: The episodes were aired as a single hour long episode in Japan.)
Heiji and Kazuha visit Tokyo where the two part ways. A murder occurs at the restaurant Kazuha is in, forcing Kogoro, Ran, Masumi, Heiji, and Conan to investigate. The witness is Andre Camel who explains the victim's last words were a confession to a poisoning. Heiji reveals the victim was speaking in a Kansai dialect and the victims actual words were referring to an unknown culprit as the poisoner. Realizing the culprit is still in the restaurant, the police narrow down the suspects to three people without alibis. After Heiji is unable to trick the culprits into revealing their Kansai dialect, Conan arranges the three culprits to drink salty miso soup; Tooru Amakasu is revealed to be the culprit after exclaiming the soup to be Karai (辛い, lit. "Spicy"), a Kansai dialect for Tokyo's Shoppai (しょっぱい, lit. "Salty"). As certain evidence, Conan points out Amakasu should have the towel stained with poison from his hands. After Amakasu is arrested, Andre and Jodie Starling examine a photo of Masumi while noting their familiarity with her face. Meanwhile, Heiji reveals his purpose of the visit was to take them to the house of deceased Kohei Wakamatsu after receiving a letter which challenges him to solve the murder.
652	7	"The Design of Poison and Mirage (Eye)"; Transliteration: "Doku to Maboroshi no Dezain (Eye)" (Japanese: 毒と幻のデザイン(Eye))	Koichiro Kuroda	N/A	April 21, 2012
Heiji explains Kazuha went to Wakamatsu's home in Osaka per the letter's instructions where she finds a disguised person with the word "EYE" carved into the bathroom tiles. The person causes a blackout, sneaks away, and the carved words disappear. Heiji elaborates that Wakamatsu was murdered in his bathroom in Karuizawa, Nagano and that the culprit was hinting a dying message had been left on the tiles. Heiji and Kazuha has Kogoro, Ran, and Conan join them to interview Wakamatsu's widow and close companions who were in his home on the day of his death. During the interview, Ikuro Wakamatsu, the victim's son, dies after eating a poisoned baumkuchen.
653	8	"The Design of Poison and Mirage (S)"; Transliteration: "Doku to Maboroshi no Dezain (S)" (Japanese: 毒と幻のデザイン(S))	Minoru Tozawa	N/A	April 28, 2012
The police arrive and their investigations reveal the baumkuchen was cut evenly into eight pieces and that only one of the piece was poisoned. As police interviews the suspects while the widow, Serika Wakamatsu, is excluded since she was never close to the baumkuchen tray. Meanwhile, the police detectives in Nagano reveal to Heiji that Wakamatsu's killer reorganized the bathroom tiles to hide the dying message; The tiles used the crazy diamonds optical illusion giving the impression that it could not be rearranged without breaking the pattern. When arranged back to normal, the message reads "SON" indicating Ikuro was Wakamatsu's killer.
654	9	"The Design of Poison and Mirage (Poison)"; Transliteration: "Doku to Maboroshi no Dezain (Poison)" (Japanese: 毒と幻のデザイン(Poison))	Tomomi Ikeda	N/A	May 5, 2012
Conan and Heiji resume their investigation while Ran and Kazuha gossip about Shinichi's confession towards Ran. Conan and Heiji discover powdered poison on Ikuro's doorknob and Serika's slippers; the evidence indicates her as Ikuro's murderer. The two confront Serika whom is found dead in her office from cyanide poisoning. Wakamatsu's secretary, Satake Yoshimi, reveals that per Serika's will, a letter of confession to Wakamatsu's murder is to be given to the police upon her death; the letter confirms Ikuro was the murderer and Serika's role in hiding the dying message.
655	10	"The Design of Poison and Mirage (Illusion)"; Transliteration: "Doku to Maboroshi no Dezain (Illusion)" (Japanese: 毒と幻のデザイン(Illusion))	Akira Yoshimura	N/A	May 12, 2012
Conan and Heiji's investigation leads them to realize how Ikuro and Serika were murdered. They reveal that when two pieces of the baumkuchen were left, they were rearranged using the Jastrow illusion and applied poison to the seemingly larger piece. For Serika's murder, the same culprit used the Gestaltzerfall phenomenon while she was signing contracts. This caused her to forget how to write the Waka (若) kanji forcing her to open a dictionary to the Wa (わ) pages where poison was applied. They reveal the culprit to be Satake, evidenced by the shine on her bronze watch due to a chemical reaction with cyanide. Satake confesses to the murders and explains it was to avenge Wakamatsu who was secretly her father. In the aftermath, Kazuha attempts to confess her feelings to Heiji but fails when he leaves partway.
656	11	"The Professor's Video Site (Part 1)"; Transliteration: "Hakase no Douga Saito (Zenpen)" (Japanese: 博士の動画サイト（前編）)	Shigeru Yamazaki	N/A	May 19, 2012
The Detective Boys are cooking curry at Agasa's home while Conan is asked to appraise an antique vase. The kids later leave to buy curry ingredient and return to find Agasa unconscious and Ayumi missing. The kidnappers send a message demanding them to look for a cat in return for Ayumi. The kidnappers send a second message saying they found their cat and detailing Ayumi's location. After rescuing Ayumi, who was rolled up in Agasa's antique rug, the Detective Boys attempt to deduce the kidnappers' motive.
657	12	"The Professor's Video Site (Part 2)"; Transliteration: "Hakase no Douga Saito (Kōhen)" (Japanese: 博士の動画サイト（後編）)	Koichiro Kuroda	N/A	May 26, 2012
Conan realizes the kidnappers invaded Agasa's home too quickly and deduces they have visited recently; Agasa reveals three pairs of customers have expressed interest in the vase. Realizing the culprits watched Agasa's online video of the vase, Conan finds the picture of the missing cat online and realizes the cat was a red hering. Conan realizes the culprits exchanged Agasa's rug with a fake and that the real rug is a valuable Persian rug. He deduces the culprits are knowledgeable about rugs and run a nearby carpet store since they had to disguise their voices. After finding an image of the culprit online, the Detective Boys confront the kidnappers, and have them convicted them based on Ayumi's earprint found on the real rug. Conan has Agasa's video erased, due to Haibara's appearance on it. Elsewhere, Masumi assists in deleting the same videos.
658	13	"The Hot Chocolate Trap"; Transliteration: "Shokora no Atsui Wana" (Japanese: ショコラの熱い罠)	Minoru Tozawa	Yasutoshi Murakawa	June 2, 2012
Through Sonoko's contacts, she invites Ran and Conan to attend the pre-opening of a chocolate restaurant managed by the famous chocolatier Yukihiko Tsujimoto. During the presentation, a fire ignites and Tsujimoto burns to death. After Conan investigates, he uses Sonoko to reveal the fire was caused by using a makeshift lithium–air battery; Salt water and the aluminum cups created static electricity which ignited the steel wool and alcoholic vapors. He reveals Mayuko Sakura, the victim's partner, to be the culprit, evidenced by the fact the water was not salted until the presentation began. Sakura confesses and reveals Tsujimoto manipulated her feelings for his own gain and intended to exile her after his success.
659	14	"Co-Investigating with a First Love (Part 1)"; Transliteration: "Hatsukoi no Kyōdō Sōsa (Zenpen)" (Japanese: 初恋の共同捜査（前編）)	Akira Yoshimura	N/A	June 9, 2012
The Detective Boys discover officer Chiba's has been vandalized with a threatening word. Realizing is the culprit is the same person who has been on a vandalism spree that month, the Detective Boys push Chiba into investigating it with his first love, Naeko Miike. They investigate an underground parking lot where the vandalism occur; There, a rear-end collision is caused by the vandalism culprit. The police seal off the parking lot leaving three people as the suspects. During the investigation, a draft removes Naeko's hat revealing her face to Chiba.
660	15	"Co-Investigating with a First Love (Part 2)"; Transliteration: "Hatsukoi no Kyōdō Sōsa (Kōhen)" (Japanese: 初恋の共同捜査（後編）)	Shigeru Yamazaki	N/A	June 16, 2012
Chiba is unable to recall Naeko's face though notes his familiarity. During the investigation, Conan realizes the culprit's motif and has the police let the suspects leave. During the night, the police set up an itasha to lure the culprit out, revealing the culprit to be Tokuko Shigei. Tokuko was vandalising cars with obstructions on their rear windows due to the trauma of her child being killed by a car of the same condition. Afterwards, Chiba remembers passing by Naeko but remains unsure of her identity.
661	16	"Kogoro-san is a Good Man (Part 1)"; Transliteration: "Kogorō-san wa Ii Hito (Zenpen)" (Japanese: 小五郎さんはいい人（前編）)	Koichiro Kuroda	N/A	June 23, 2012
Ran and Conan meet Takae Kiritani, an elderly woman who claims Kogoro had been visiting and assisting her on a weekly basis. They discover that Ryohei Onda has been posing as Kogoro to entertain and assist Kiritani. During their visit, a neighbor, Gensuke Denikawa is found dead by the other neighbors.
662	17	"Kogoro-san is a Good Man (Part 2)"; Transliteration: "Kogorō-san wa Ii Hito (Kōhen)" (Japanese: 小五郎さんはいい人（後編）)	Minoru Tozawa	N/A	June 30, 2012
Conan completes his investigation and realizes who the murderer is. The suspects, realizing Ryohei is a fake, challenges him to declare who the culprit is. Conan relays his deductions to Ryohei explaining a system of fans and TV remotes created a fake time of death; This was done setting one of the fans and remote to channel surf while the other fan and remote is set on a timer to turn off the TV. They reveal the remotes were most likely held in place by a rubber band which Hyodo Junjei has on him. As evidence, the blood smear from the victim was found on the rubber bands. Junjei confesses and reveals the victim blackmailed him after finding out he was a drug dealer. Conan and Ran confront Ryohei about his identity and learns Kiritani was his elementary school teacher who influenced him. Days later, Kiritani sends a post card to Kogoro thanking him for sending his disciple Ryohei, to look after her.
663	18	"Chase the Miyama Stag Beetle"; Transliteration: "Miyamakuwagata o Oe" (Japanese: ミヤマクワガタを追え)	Shirabe Kobayashi	Toyoto Kogiso	July 7, 2012
The Detective Boys wish to capture a few beetles to bring to school, and as a result, visit Agasa's old friend in the mountains. The Detective Boys manage to find a bunch of beetles at night, but return to find Namatame injured. Namatame's last words are "Miyama Stag Beetle" before losing consciousness.
664	19	"The Great Dog Coeur's Triumph 2"; Transliteration: "Meiken Kūru no o Tegara 2" (Japanese: 名犬クールのお手柄2)	Akira Yoshimura	Kazunari Kochi	July 14, 2012
The Detective Boys find a strange map on the back of a piece of paper, with many 'x's at different locations. As the group visits each house, they are able to figure about the meaning behind the 'x's, as well as the identity of the murderer.
665	20	"The Suspicious Initial K"; Transliteration: "Giwaku no Inisharu K" (Japanese: 疑惑のイニシャルK)	Shigeru Yamazaki	Chiko Uonji	July 21, 2012
Anblick Tateno and Kogoro found a dead body in the house and a devious old man was murdered in cold blood, leaving only the letter "k" as a message. And there were two suspect who might be true culprit of the murder in cold blood, and both of them had a "K" letter in each name.
666	21	"The Rainy Night Menace"; Transliteration: "Ame no Yoru no Kyōhaku-sha" (Japanese: 雨の夜の脅迫者)	Minoru Tozawa	Junichi Miyashita	July 28, 2012
Officer Chiba is asked to help a woman who feels she is being stalked, but after the supposed stalker is found dead in her home. It is suspected she murdered him, and Conan have to uncover the truth behind the crime scene.
667	22	"Wedding Eve (Part 1)"; Transliteration: "Uedingu Ivu (Zenpen)" (Japanese: ウエディング・イヴ （前編）)	Yasuichiro Yamamoto	N/A	September 1, 2012
Kogoro, Ran, and Conan are invited by Kogoro's friend, Raita Banba, to attend his pre-wedding party. Banba's bride, Hatsune Kamon, leaves to have her nails done. Shortly on her return, she receives a phone call at the parking lot that shocks her. She calls Banba, bidding him farewell, and her car is engulfed by fire. The police arrive and their DNA test reveals a rough match of Banba's DNA was found on Kamon's nails insinuates him as the murderer. Banba proclaims innocence and reveals the culprit is most likely Tooru Amuro, their waiter who has secretly met with Kamon. Tooru explains he was hired by Kamon to investigate Banba and see if he was having an affair; To attest to his alibi, Amuro reveals Banba also hired a detective to follow Kamon for the same reasons. The detective confirms Amuro's identity and leaves Banba as the main suspect. Conan investigates, finds out that Kamon was making secret phone calls, and learns from Amuro that she was disturbed to discover Banba and she were orphaned by the same hotel fire.
668	23	"Wedding Eve (Part 2)"; Transliteration: "Uedingu Ivu (Kōhen)" (Japanese: ウエディング・イヴ （後編）)	Koichiro Kuroda	N/A	September 8, 2012
A second DNA test with sterile samples reconfirms the rough DNA match leading Conan to a conclusion. Conan tranquilizes Kogoro and reveals Banba and Kamon are opposite sex identical twins. The secret phone calls were to a medical consultant with the final phone call confirming the genetic match. Learning of his, Kamon clasped her face into her hands, scratching some skin off, and committed suicide. In the aftermath, Amuro pays Kogoro to have him as his apprentice.
669	24	"The Dark Tower's Hidden Treasure (Part 1)"; Transliteration: "Kurayami Tō no Hihō (Zenpen)" (Japanese: くらやみ塔の秘宝 （前編）)	Minoru Tozawa	Masaki Tsuji	September 15, 2012
Ran's karate senpai, Kyodo Nanami, invites the Detective Boys for a treasure hunt at her home. Once there, they discover the fact that the treasure is very likely hidden in the Dark Tower. However, there aren't any entrances nor windows to enter the tower with. Around the estate, they also discover that this house has been equipped with various tricks and traps. Later, Nanami's mother, Kyodo Momoe, had been discovered dead, thought to have fallen from the tower. While investigating both cases, Haibara disappears, and the others also discover two secret entrances.
670	25	"The Dark Tower's Hidden Treasure (Part 2)"; Transliteration: "Kurayami Tō no Hihō (Kōhen)" (Japanese: くらやみ塔の秘宝 （後編）)	Koichiro Kuroda Yasuro Tsuchiya	Masaki Tsuji	September 22, 2012
While investigating in a tunnel, Conan is separated from everybody else. As he realizes he has ventured into the tower itself, he lets everybody into the tower. He then tranquilizes Kogoro and explains that Momoe's death was an accident due holography and a misunderstanding. Afterwards, Haibara, Ayumi, Mitsuhiko, and Genta are discovered to be safe and that the treasure hidden in the tower was a giant kaleidoscope.
671	26	"Detectives' Nocturne (The Case)"; Transliteration: "Tantei-tachi no Yasōkyoku (Jiken)" (Japanese: 探偵たちの夜想曲（事件）)	Akira Yoshimura	N/A	October 6, 2012
Kogoro prepares to meet with the client Kei Katshitsuka. While waiting, he receives mail of Katshitsuka who changes their meeting location to a local restaurant. There, Kogoro realizes the cell phone address is different from the first message he received from the client. He, along with Tooru, Ran, and Conan return to the agency where they discover Katshitsuka tied up with her kidnapper dead. The police arrive and determine the kidnapper killed himself since no gunpowder was found on Katshitsuka. The four accompany Katshitsuka home; during the ride, Conan ponders on why the kidnapper's wallet was full of coins and small bills, his cellphone having only a history of one message and the lack of gunpowder on Katshitsuka.
672	27	"Detectives' Nocturne (Kidnapping)"; Transliteration: "Tantei-tachi no Yasōkyoku (Yūkan)" (Japanese: 探偵たちの夜想曲（誘拐）)	Shigeru Yamazaki	N/A	October 13, 2012
Arriving at Katshitsuka's home, Ran receives a phone call from Masumi. The phone call receives noise which Tooru deduces to indicate the house is bugged. While Kogoro, Ran, and Tooru investigate the house, Conan notices Katshitsuka sneaking out and accompanies her for a drive. Meanwhile, Tooru finds a dead man in the apartment and realizes he was the one actually living there. Meanwhile, Katshitsuka drugs Conan to sleep and sends a ransom to Kogoro to prevent him from calling the police. The three at the apartment discover the victim has recordings of a recent bank robbery indicating he was related to it and that the victim of the bank robbery, Kenya Shouno, was the man in the picture with Katshitsuka. Ran tells Agasa to use the tracker to find Conan. Agasa, Haibara, and Subaru proceed to follow the signal. Meanwhile, Masumi also decides to search for Conan.
673	28	"Detectives' Nocturne (Deduction)"; Transliteration: "Tantei-tachi no Yasōkyoku (Suiri)" (Japanese: 探偵たちの夜想曲（推理）)	Nobuharu Kamanaka	N/A	October 20, 2012
Conan stops feigning his sleep and tells his kidnapper she is actually Serina Urakawa and that Kei Katshitsuka was the dead man at the agency; his deduction stemmed from a phone call to Shouno's relatives to find out the identity of his girlfriend. Conan explains that Katshitsuka and the man in the apartment were two of the three robbers. Urakawa learned from Shouno that Katshitsuka was one of the robbers. When visiting his apartment, she meets second robber whom she killed in self defense. After learning that Katshitsuka plans on meeting with Kogoro to find out which locker the money was hidden in, she attempts to interrogate him and fashions his murder as a suicide by drugging him, placing the gun in his hands, and pulling the trigger with a string. As for the third robber, Urakawa plans on visiting the three female contacts found on Katshitsuka's phone to determine which one is the culprit. Meanwhile, Kogoro, Ran, and Amuro also discover that information and begin their travel there.
674	29	"Detectives' Nocturne (Bourbon)"; Transliteration: "Tantei-tachi no Yasōkyoku (Bābon)" (Japanese: 探偵たちの夜想曲（バーボン）)	Minoru Tozawa	N/A	October 27, 2012
After visiting the three, Conan explains the robber in the video was left-handed and only Takayo Tegawa fit that description. To further his argument, Conan explains the stolen money was marked forcing the robbers to spend it in vending machines; this explains Katshitsuka's wallet and Tegawa's trash full of Gyūdon which can be bought from a vending machine. Tegawa overhears their conversation and holds Conan at gunpoint ordering Urakawa to drive. Subaru, Tooru, and Masumi pursue and apprehend Tegawa. From overhead, Vermouth calls one of them, addressing them as Bourbon and reminding Bourbon to follow through with their promise.
675	30	"Won't Forgive Even One Millimeter (Part 1)"; Transliteration: "1 Miri mo Yurusanai (Zenpen)" (Japanese: 1ミリも許さない （前編）)	Akira Yoshimura	N/A	November 10, 2012
The detective boys are invited by a couple for barbecue. After eating the husband was looking for his phone get engaged into a quarrel with his wife. Meanwhile, Ayumi finds the cellphone and goes to return it to the couple finding the wife trying to kill her husband. As the detective boys go into the house they find the wife was lying on the ground stabbed in the heart.
676	31	"Won't Forgive Even One Millimeter (Part 2)"; Transliteration: "1 Miri mo Yurusanai (Kōhen)" (Japanese: 1ミリも許さない （後編）)	Koichiro Kuroda	N/A	November 17, 2012
The wife is taken to the hospital. After seeing the situation and finding proofs, Conan deduces that the husband tried to kill his wife. The operation turned out to be successful. The husband afraid of, that his wife would reveal everything, tried to commit suicide but was stopped by Conan and Haibara. He confesses that he tried to his wife. After the confession Conan tells him about the true messages that his wife sent to his colleagues and also tells that his wife is pregnant although she is not aware of it. Meanwhile after recovery the wife changes her statement to prevent her husband from going to jail.
677	32	"The Footprintless Beach"; Transliteration: "Ashiato ga Nai Sunahama" (Japanese: 足跡がない砂浜)	Shigeru Yamazaki	Takeo Ohno	November 24, 2012
Mouri, Ran, and Conan try surfing for the first time with their surf instructor and her much older husband. The couple soon gets into a heated argument over the safety of surfing with an approaching storm, hinting at a troubled relationship. They find the wife dead on the beach the next morning. The absence of footprints suggest a surfing accident. Conan soon observes clues indicating foul play. Sleeping Kogoro reveals that the husband murdered his wife and carried her body to the beach without leaving footprints by crawling inside a cardboard wheel.
678	33	"Nagasaki Mystery Theater (Bakumatsu Part)"; Transliteration: "Nagasaki Misuterī Gekijō (Bakumatsu-hen)" (Japanese: 長崎ミステリー劇場（幕末篇）)	Nobuharu Kamanaka	Junichi Miyashita	December 1, 2012
Ran wins a trip to Nagasaki with Mouri and Conan. While touring the city, they unintentionally interrupt the filming of a mystery drama. Mouri is hired as a consultant to figure out the story's ending because the scriptwriter disappeared. The group examines the scriptwriter's room and finds newspaper clippings of a real case of serial thefts. The group spots the scriptwriter but he runs off before they can catch up to him. When the next part of the script is e-mailed to the crew, Ran and Conan are dragged in as extras. Conan realizes that the script contains hidden messages. The prop technician is attacked and he points at Ran with his dying breath.
679	34	"Nagasaki Mystery Theater (Present-Day Part)"; Transliteration: "Nagasaki Misuterī Gekijō (Gendai-hen)" (Japanese: 長崎ミステリー劇場（現代篇）)	Minoru Tozawa	Junichi Miyashita	December 8, 2012
Conan luckily finds a witness who saw Ran studying her lines providing her with a solid alibi. One of the actors, Sazanami, is attacked later that night and the scriptwriter's fingerprints are found on his belongings. Conan follows the clues in the hidden messages and gathers everyone at the theater. Sleeping Kogoro reveals that the scriptwriter discovered that Sazanami and the prop technician were partners in the serial thefts and feared for his life. The prop technician understood the hidden messages and tried to run away. He pointed at Ran because the role she was playing held the clues to identifying Sazanami.
680	35	"Cactus Capriccio"; Transliteration: "Saboten Kyou Sou Kyoku" (Japanese: サボテン狂騒曲)	Koichiro Kuroda	Yasutoshi Murakawa	December 15, 2012
Sonoko, Ran, and Conan are visiting a cacti greenhouse. The sons of the owner interrupt with angry outbursts about being removed from their father's will. The owner explains that he's disappointed in his sons living off his fortune and that he will leave everything to the botanical garden. The security alarm later rings and the son Yasuyuki is found standing over his father's dead body. All clues point to him as the culprit, but the Queen of Deduction reveals that Misa, the housekeeper, killed the owner and used the greenhouse temperature settings to trigger the security alarm to create a time alibi.

== Home media release ==
Shogakukan/Being (Japan, Region 2 DVD)
Volume	Episodes^{Jp.}	Release date	Ref.
Volume 1	646–647, 651	February 22, 2013	
Volume 2	648–650, 658	March 22, 2013	
Volume 3	652–655	April 26, 2013	
Volume 4	656–657, 659–660	May 24, 2013	
Volume 5	661–664	June 21, 2013	
Volume 6	665–668	July 26, 2013	
Volume 7	669–670, 677, 680	August 23, 2013	
Volume 8	671–674	September 27, 2013	
Volume 9	675–676, 678–679	October 25, 2013	

== Notes ==
- ^1 hr. The episodes were aired as a single hour-long episode in Japan
