= Case Closed season 20 =

Season of television series

Case Closed
- Season 20
- The cover of the first DVD compilation for season twenty of Detective Conan released by Shogakukan
- No. of episodes: 40

Release
- Original network: NNS (ytv)
- Original release: February 19, 2011 – February 11, 2012

Season chronology
- ← Previous; Season 19 Next → Season 21

The twentieth season of the Case Closed anime was directed by Kōjin Ochi and produced by TMS Entertainment and Yomiuri Telecasting Corporation. The series is based on Gosho Aoyama's Case Closed manga series. In Japan, the series is titled Detective Conan (名探偵コナン, Meitantei Conan) but was changed due to legal issues with the title Detective Conan. The series focuses on the adventures of teenage detective Shinichi Kudo who was turned into a child by a poison called APTX 4869, but continues working as a detective under the alias Conan Edogawa.

The episodes use nine pieces of theme music: four opening and five ending themes. The first opening theme is "tear drops" by Caos Caos Caos and is used up to episode 612. The second opening theme is "Don't Wanna Lie" by B'z from episodes 613 to 626. The third opening theme is "Misty Mystery" by Garnet Crow from episodes 627 to 641. The fourth opening is "Miss Mystery" by Breakerz is used from 642 and onwards. The first ending theme, Jûgoya Kuraishisu (Kimi ni Aitai) (十五夜クライシス～君に逢いたい～, lit. "Full Moon Night's Crisis (I Want to See You)") by Hundred Percent Free is used up to 609. The second ending theme is Tsukiyo no Itazura no Mahou (月夜の悪戯の魔法, lit. "Mischievous Magic on the Moonlit Night") by Breakerz is used from episodes 610 to 626. The third ending theme is Pilgrim (ピルグリム, Pirugurimu) by B'z and was used for episodes 627 and 628. The fourth ending theme is "Your Best Friend" by Mai Kuraki from episode 629 to 643. The fifth ending theme is Kanashimi hodo Kyō no Yūhi Kirei dane (悲しみほど 今日の夕陽きれいだね, lit. "Compared With the Sadness, Today's Sunset Is More Beautiful") by grram beginning on episode 644.

The season initially ran from February 19, 2011, through February 11, 2012, on Nippon Television Network System in Japan. The season was later collected and released in ten DVD compilations by Shogakukan between January 27, 2012, and October 26, 2012, in Japan.

== Episode list ==
No.	No. in season	Title	Directed by	Written by	Original air date
606	1	"Courtroom Confrontation IV: Juror Sumiko Kobayashi (Part 1)"; Transliteration: "Houtei no Taiketsu IV Saibanin Kobayashi Sumiko (Zenpen)" (Japanese: 法廷の対決IV裁判員小林澄子（前編）)	Shigeru Yamazaki	Yutaka Kaneko	February 19, 2011
Sumiko Kobayashi is called to be a jury for a murder Tadashi Ishigaki. Toshio Iwamatsu, a burglar who broke into Ishigaki's home, is held accounted for the murder and Eri Kisaki is assigned as his attorney and Reiko Kujo acts as the prosecutor. Kogoro, Ran, and Conan attend the hearing where Ishigaki's housemaid and brother-in-law deliver their testimonies of discovering the body. Unable to find the murder weapon, the court ends without a decision and will resume the day after. During the session, Sumiko notes aloud that the painting in Ishigaki's room is upside down prompting Kogoro and Conan to investigate the room. Inside the painting, they find a document stating Iwamatsu burrowed money from Ishigaki. Conan deduces the culprit took a document and placed the painting upside down in his rush and discovers that a vase in the room is missing after Ishigaki's murder.
607	2	"Courtroom Confrontation IV: Juror Sumiko Kobayashi (Part 2)"; Transliteration: "Houtei no Taiketsu IV Saibanin Kobayashi Sumiko (Kōhen)" (Japanese: 法廷の対決IV裁判員小林澄子（後編）)	Akira Yoshimura	Yutaka Kaneko	February 26, 2011
Due to the housemaid's behavior, Conan pressures the housemaid about the vase. That night, Kogoro and Conan ambush her in the middle of returning the vase to the crime scene. The next day, court resumes and Reiko presents the documents pertaining Ishigaki's burrowed money and the murder weapon found in a distant pound. Eri calls the maid up as a witness who explains she found the vase at a garbage collection point. Eri then calls upon Kogoro whom Conan tranquilizes and reveals the culprit to be the brother-in-law, Tooru Tsukano. Conan explains that after Tsukano murdered Ishigaki, he took a document, hunt up the painting, and hid behind the door as Iwamatsu entered the room and knocks the vase to Tsukano's feet. Tsukano hides the knife and gloves inside the vase and leaves the vase at the garbage collection point and establish and alibi. He then afterwards placed the knife in the park and disposes the gloves he used to commit the murder. As evidence, a bloody fingerprint is found in the vase. Tsukano confesses and reveals he embezzled money from Ishigaki who took his sister's deed to a land as a result and enraging Tsukano to murder him. In the end Iwamatsu is cleared of murder charges and Tsukano will be trailed for murder.
608	3	"White Day of Betrayal (Part 1)"; Transliteration: "Uragiri no Howaito Dē (Zenpen)" (Japanese: 裏切りのホワイトデー（前編）)	Tomomi Ikeda	N/A	March 5, 2011
Kogoro appears in a commercial to promote white chocolate for White Day and is invited to a chocolate company's party. Kogoro, Ran, and Conan attend and are introduced to the company presidents, Taruto Urai and his wife Hoshie Urai. During the party, Taruto dies from cyanide poisoning. Inspector Megure and his Officers are called to investigate the death. The investigation leads Hoshie to be the prime suspect. As she is taken away to be searched, Hoshie trips and falls on a table causing many lemon tea glasses to shatter. Meanwhile, evidence of a medicinal wafer containing poison is found in Urai's mouth suggesting suicide. Conan is ascertain Hoshie to be the culprit and investigates on how she delivered the poison to her husband.
609	4	"White Day of Betrayal (Part 2)"; Transliteration: "Uragiri no Howaito Dē (Kōhen)" (Japanese: 裏切りのホワイトデー（後編）)	Minoru Tozawa	N/A	March 19, 2011
Conan investigates and upon discovering the method, tranquilizers Kogoro and explains how Hoshie committed the murder. He explains the burn marks on Hoshie's napkin indicate cyanide was on the napkin and the poison was placed on a lemon slice. Conan elaborates explaining how Taruto was famously known to hate sour things, and had planned to surprise his guest by eating sour food with the use of synsepalum dulcificum. Upon testing if the synsepalum dulcificum was still in effect, Taruto ate the poisoned lemon slice. While down, Hoshie took the lemon and placed the medicinal wafer in her husband's mouth and hid the lemon slice among the others during her fall. Conan concludes that Hoshie's fingerprint and Taruto's saliva should be on the poisoned lemon slice. Hoshie confesses revealing her motive is revenge for her former boyfriend who Taruto pushed to suicide. On the way home, Ran is visibly saddened when she is the only one to have not received a White Day gift but is cheered up when she discovers white throat lozenges from a postage left by Shinichi.
610	5	"The Victim is Shinichi Kudo"; Transliteration: "Higaisha wa Kudō Shinichi" (Japanese: 被害者はクドウシンイチ)	Koichiro Kuroda	N/A	April 9, 2011
Heiji and Kazuha arrive at the Mori Detective agency revealing he was hired by a man named Shinichi Inubushi, one of the eight illegitimate children of the rich Tsunechika Inubushi. After Tsunechika's death, the health of his wife, Satomi, begins to fail and subsequently two of the illegitimate children are murdered. Believing the murderer is after the inheritance, Shinichi surrenders his share and takes up his mother's surname, Kudo, and has Heiji investigate the murders. Heiji and Conan drop by Kudo's home only to find out from his personal care assistant, Funae Abukawa, that he is asleep. After half an hour, they discover Kudo dead from Carbon monoxide poisoning caused by a single charcoal burner. Their investigation reveals Abukawa is the murderer, as Kudo's body revealed he died much earlier and a single charcoal burner would take too long to fill the entire room. Abukawa confesses to have set up the crime scene but explains she found Kudo dead in his closet and was threatened by the murderer to cover that fact. Heiji and Conan discover a pink pearl in Kudo's mouth and perceive it as a dying message to indicate the murderer.
611	6	"Inubushi Castle, The Flame of the Demon Dog (Will-o'-The-Wisp Chapter)"; Transliteration: "Inubushi Jou En no Mainu (Onibi no Akira)" (Japanese: 犬伏城 炎の魔犬（鬼火の章）)	Shigeru Yamazaki	N/A	April 16, 2011
Mori takes Ran, Kazuha, Conan, and Heiji to the Inubushi household where they are introduced to the family. They learn about the legend passed down in the Inubushi family where their ancestor set his dog on fire after mistakenly assuming the dog killed his daughter while in reality, the dog saved his daughter. The ancestor was then killed in a house fire and the myth of the Inubushi curse was passed down. Conan and Heiji decide to investigate the headstone of the supposed dog when they witness Saki Inubushi fall from a cliff. Saki claims an ablaze inugami chased her and dies shortly after. Conan and Heiji discover flaming dog-prints atop the cliff establishing Saki's story. Inspector Misao Yamamura is called to the scene and joins them on their investigation. They discover that the other three victims had a pachinko ball, table tennis ball, and marble beside their bodies. Conan and Heiji return to Saki's crime scene to investigate. Ran and Kazuha feed the family dog and are confronted by the inugami.
612	7	"Inubushi Castle, The Flame of the Demon Dog (Footsteps Chapter)"; Transliteration: "Inubushi Jou En no Mainu (Ashiato no Akira)" (Japanese: 犬伏城 炎の魔犬（足跡の章）)	Nobuharu Kamanaka	N/A	April 23, 2011
Ran and Kazuha retreat inside the house and discover the inugami is gone. Conan and Heiji's investigation leads them to find conclusive evidence Saki's death was planned by the culprit. After hearing Ran and Kazuha's story, they realize the culprit is housing the inugami nearby and investigates an abandoned cabin. Inside the cabin yields evidence of a dog living there confirming their deduction. Nearby, Tomoaki Inubashi is pounced by the inugami and receives minor burns; an onion is found near the attack. Heiji asks Miyuki Inubashi about the family history and learns that Tsunechika had planned names for all eight of his illegitimate children which are based on the eight virtues of confucianism.
613	8	"Inubushi Castle, The Flame of the Demon Dog (Chapter of Princess)"; Transliteration: "Inubushi Jou En no Mainu (Hime no Akira)" (Japanese: 犬伏城 炎の魔犬（姫の章）)	Tomomi Ikeda	N/A	April 30, 2011
Satomi attempts to leave her room and collapses; she is found holding onto a broken Buddhist prayer beads with a black bead four down from the top. Later that night, they discover a letter signed by Miyuki confessing to the crime and is at the abandoned cabin. Conan and co head there and discover the cabin covered in gasoline and the inugami running towards it. Conan catches the inugami revealing the fire effect was created by imitation fire clothing with remote controlled lights. The flaming dog-prints were caused by modified lighters placed on the ground and tied to a wire with a hoop at the end. The dog had a mesh-enclosed charcoal tied to its tail, and when passing over the lighters, ignited them. When the dog retrieved the hoop, the lighter came with it, explaining how the lighters were not found after creating the dog-prints. Heiji points out Tomoaki as the culprit, evidenced by the inugami recognizing him as his master, and Satomi's prayer beads. The beads indicated the fourth of the eight virtues which is found in Tomoaki's name. As Tomoaki is taken into custody, he reveals he wanted to increase his inheritance in order to maintain the Inubushi household for Satomi.
614	9	"The Secret Played by the Diary (Part 1)"; Transliteration: "Nikki ga Kanaderu Himitsu (Zenpen)" (Japanese: 日記が奏でる秘密（前編）)	Akira Yoshimura	N/A	May 7, 2011
The Detective Boys are stranded on a mountain when Agasa's car breaks down. Seeking shelter from the rain they come across a villa where piano music was heard and enter the house when their calls are unanswered. Inside, they explore and discover a diary on the table confessing to a plan of a kidnapping and murdering a boy; a blackout then occurs due to the storm. They find a small coffin planned for the murder and realize its empty and the possibility the boy is still alive. At that moment, piano music is heard again. Conan assures them it will be safe to search the house as the culprit is playing the piano. Ayumi wanders off on her own and finds a photo of a family and a room with water leaking out of it.
615	10	"The Secret Played by the Diary (Part 2)"; Transliteration: "Nikki ga Kanaderu Himitsu (Kōhen)" (Japanese: 日記が奏でる秘密（後編）)	Koichiro Kuroda	N/A	May 14, 2011
Realizing the piano playing they hear is a recording, they enter the piano room. Conan notices the piano chair was set to a child's height and deduces where the boy is. He has the Detective Boys sing a song in the piano room and catches the boy watching them and befriends him. The boy, Keita Onoda, is a piano prodigy to which the kidnapper abducted to allow his daughter to win a piano competition. Conan also reveals the diary entry is out of order due to Keita's tampering and that the kidnapper felt increasingly guilty as the days went on. After reading the last page in the diary, they realize the kidnapper plans to suicide in the bathroom and manage to save him. In the aftermath, Keita's mother does not push charges due to Keita's defense. The kidnapper's daughter meanwhile, revealed she skipped the piano competition as she was worried about Keita's disappearance.
616	11	"Holmes' Revelation (Holmes' Apprentice)"; Transliteration: "Hōmuzu no Mokushiroku (Hōmuzu no Deshi)" (Japanese: ホームズの黙示録（名探偵の弟子）)	Minoru Tozawa	N/A	May 21, 2011
Kogoro, Ran, and Conan find a cat belonging to a rich British woman who offers to pay their expenses on a trip to London so Kogoro may share his detective stories with her friends. To get past airport security, Haibara offers Conan two antidotes to the APTX 4869 for the trip and back. At the Holmes museum, Ran calls Shinichi asking him if he wants a souvenir from London. His weak reaction causes Ran to angrily hang up. Outside the museum, a kid named Apollo Glass asks to see Sherlock Holmes to a solve a code that will prevent a person from being murdered. Conan offers to solve the riddle by posing as Holme's apprentice. Apollo reveals a strange man gave him a note containing seven coded riddles, declaring someone in London will die if it is left unsolved. They learn from the police that many children received the same code which Conan speculates to mean a large number of people will die. Conan and Agasa separate from the group as they attempt to decode the riddles.
617	12	"Holmes' Revelation (Love is 0)"; Transliteration: "Hōmuzu no Mokushiroku (Love is 0)" (Japanese: ホームズの黙示録（Love is 0）)	Shigeru Yamazaki	N/A	May 28, 2011
Ran, feeling upset as she believes Shinichi does not share her feelings, is confided by Apollo's sister, pro tennis player Minerva Glass. Minerva then parts ways with Ran advising her love is zero and would never amount to anything no matter the effort. Ran calls Shinichi for advice on the riddles. Conan, tells Ran the first riddle "A rolling bell rises me", refers to Big Ben and accidentally reveals he is in London. Realizing Ran will discover Conan's true identity if she finds him, Conan and Agasa flee from her. Conan becomes cornered in a phone booth and is forced to take the antidote to the APTX 4869 for the return trip and confronts Ran as Shinichi. Ran confesses her pain of liking Shinichi who is indifferent to her feelings and runs away as he pursues her.
618	13	"Holmes' Revelation (Satan)"; Transliteration: "Hōmuzu no Mokushiroku (Satan)" (Japanese: ホームズの黙示録（サタン）)	Nobuharu Kamanaka	N/A	June 4, 2011
The next day, the police reveal the identity of the man who created the note, Sabara Hades. Kogoro and Ran decode the riddle "My portion is like a chilled boiled egg like a corpse" which refers to City Hall. There, they find many dolls with Mazarin Stone written on their shirts where when beheaded, reveals the letter "T". The riddle "I finished up with a whole pickle" refers to 30 St Mary Axe where scratched up pens labeled as Dancing Men reveal the letter "N". Ran and Kogoro revisit Big Ben following the riddle "It rings again for my hatred" and find an arrow pointing to a drain where The Valley of Fear of fear is inscribed. They deduce something had been sunk in the river, and find a drain cover with the letter "A". Apollo leads the two to the next riddle, "Now I remember to ask a cake to celebrate in advance" referring to St Bride's Church where they find letters entitled A Scandal in Bohemia. Soaking the letter in water reveals the letter "S".
619	14	"Holmes' Revelation (Code Break)"; Transliteration: "Hōmuzu no Mokushiroku （Code Break）" (Japanese: ホームズの黙示録（Code Break）)	Tomomi Ikeda	N/A	June 11, 2011
Conan deduces the line "I'm a long nosed wizard in a castle" refers to Elephant & Castle tube station and shares this with Ran and Kogoro. There, they notice a strange man with identity written on his suitcase who explains he was paid to wear those clothes and carry the case. Conan explains it refers to the Sherlock Holmes story A Case of Identity and asks them to check the man's pants where the letter "U" is found. The final riddle "It tells me to finish everything piercing a white back with two swords" refers to a logo of a porcelain store. Visiting the store, they find an ornament containing strings of different colors with a bell at the end. They conclude it refers to A Study in Scarlet where a red string is found with the letter "R". Conan realizes the word is Saturn meaning Saturday. On the day of the supposed murder, they find that tracing the locations from the code reveals a tennis racquet indicating Hades plans to kill someone during the Wimbledon championships finals. Conan and Co are able to enter Henman Hill with Diana's assistance in order to observe the finals. As Minerva plays against her opponent, she prays for Holmes to help her.
620	15	"Holmes' Revelation (Grass Court Queen)"; Transliteration: "Hōmuzu no Mokushiroku (Gurasukōtokuīn)" (Japanese: ホームズの黙示録（芝の女王）)	Koichiro Kuroda	N/A	June 18, 2011
Conan notices Minerva's serves are braille for "help" and convinces Apollo to lend him his ticket in order to enter Centre Court to locate Hades. From the stands, Conan conveys to Minerva he is Holme's apprentice and he will help her. In the same manner, Minerva relays the message "Game Set Death Mom" revealing that at the end of the finals, her mother, Juno Glass, will die. Conan suspects that the teddy bear Juno received contains a bomb and the detonator is with Hades who is presumed to be watching her from across the stands with a video camera. Realizing it would be impossible to remove the bomb without Hades noticing, Conan opts to search for the criminal and asks Minerva to stall the match as long as possible.
621	16	"Holmes' Revelation (0 is Start)"; Transliteration: "Hōmuzu no Mokushiroku (Zero is Start)" (Japanese: ホームズの黙示録（0 is Start）)	Akira Yoshimura	N/A	June 25, 2011
Conan locates Hades during Minerva's rally with her opponent and proceeds to his location. He meets his parents on the way who gives him the tickets needed to enter the stands where Hades is located. Yusaku Kudo explains that during a tennis match, the heads of the fans would follow the ball while Hades would continuously look onwards at Juno. With Minerva's help, Conan is able to apprehend Hades who is taken into custody. After Minerva wins the championships, Ran meets with her and tells her Shinichi confessed to her; proclaiming that while love is zero, zero is also a starting point. Conan meanwhile, is given an antidote for the APTX 4869, by his parents for the return trip to Japan.
622	17	"Emergency Situation 252 (Part 1)"; Transliteration: "Kinkyū Jitai 252 (Zenpen)" (Japanese: 緊急事態252（前編）)	Minoru Tozawa	N/A	July 2, 2011
The Detective Boys sneak into an abandoned building that due to be demolished to play hide and seek. While playing Genta hears someone tapping a 2-5-2 code which is used in Japan to call for help. They find two construction workers who claim to be surveying the area before destroying the building by implosion. Conan quickly deduces they are confining a person in the building due to regulations preventing the building they are in to be imploded. The criminals, realizing they have been figured out, seal up the building and chase after the kids. Conan is knocked out by his rebounding soccer ball and Ai is captured. The criminals prevent the remaining Detective Boys from calling the police by threatening to kill Conan and Ai.
623	18	"Emergency Situation 252 (Part 2)"; Transliteration: "Kinkyū Jitai 252 (Kōhen)" (Japanese: 緊急事態252（後編）)	Shigeru Yamazaki	N/A	July 9, 2011
Mitsuhiko, Ayumi, and Genta hide in the lockers where the criminals confine their hostages. The criminals attempt to call the hostage's home for ransom but is answered by a young man. Concluding their plan to be a failure, they opt to set the building ablaze to hide the evidence. Conan communicates to the Detective Boys by tapping his detective badge, and orders them to call their cellphones to lure the criminals out of the room. After doing so, Conan incapacitates one of the criminals and tricks the other one into fleeing the building. The second criminal is then knocked out by Subaru Okiya who picks up the kids and reveals the kidnappe to be Agasa. Subaru reveals he deduced Agasa's situation from observing the house and receiving the ransom phone call and had tracked the kids down using Conan's spare glasses. Meanwhile, Agasa reveals he tapped the 2-5-2 purely by coincidence while hoping others would notice.
624	19	"A Video Letter of First Love"; Transliteration: "Hatsukoi no Bideoretā" (Japanese: 初恋のビデオレター)	Nobuharu Kamanaka	N/A	July 16, 2011
Chiba searches the storage room of Teitan Elementary for a thirteen-year-old VHS tape from his childhood love, Naeko Miike, which contains the reply to his love letter. At the same time, the Detective Boys are sent to the archives to search for a tape for their teacher. Chiba reveals to them that he received a phone call from Naeko Miike asking him if he has seen the tape, prompting him to resume his search for it. Conan deduces the tape contains the video Chiba and Naeko filmed years ago and finds the tape has been recorded over. He realizes Chiba was pron to sweaty hands and reveals Naeko wrote on the side the tape with red permanent markers which reveal she reciprocated Chiba's feelings. Chiba attends the school reunion only to find out Naeko did not attend. Unbeknownst to him, he passes Naeko in an officer uniform. Naeko reveals to her partner she recently transferred to the Tokyo Metropolitan Police Department in order to get closer to Chiba but is saddened he was unable to recognize her.
625	20	"The Screaming Operation Room(Part 1)"; Transliteration: "Zekkyō Operūmu (Zenpen)" (Japanese: 絶叫手術室（前編）)	Tomomi Ikeda	N/A	July 23, 2011
Kogoro attends his alma mater and takes Conan, Ran, and Sonoko with him. A university student named Sonsaku Tsujiei asks Ran if she could examine how realistic their corpse is and guides her along with Conan and Sonoko through a haunted house production hosted by Tsujiei and his three friends. Inside the set, Anna Tadami dies after convulsing on a table. The police conclude it to be suicide after finding a cyanide capsule in her mouth and her past obsession with death. However, Conan points out that marks on the victim's face revealed an unknown assailant forced Tadami to bite into the capsule allowing the police to consider the possibility of murder.
626	21	"The Screaming Operation Room (Part 2)"; Transliteration: "Zekkyō Operūmu (Kōhen)" (Japanese: 絶叫手術室（後編）)	Koichiro Kuroda	N/A	July 30, 2011
Conan investigates the scene and deduces Tadami was already dead before they arrived in the room and that the culprit feigned her convulsion in order to fake the time of death. He tranquilizes Sonoko and explains his deductions to the police revealing the culprit went under the table and used his feet in place of Tadami's which caused the convulsion. He declares Tsujiei as the culprit, evidenced by Tsujiei's toe nails which were painted red to match Tadami's feet. Tsujiei confesses and reveals Tadami encouraged their terminally ill friend into suicide a month ago because she wanted to see a person die.
627	22	"Conan & Kid's Battle For Ryoma's Treasure (Part 1)"; Transliteration: "Conan Kiddo no Ryōma Otakara Kōbō-sen (Zenpen)" (Japanese: コナンキッドの龍馬お宝攻防戦（前編）)	Minoru Tozawa	N/A	August 20, 2011
The Phantom Thief Kid sends a notice to Jirokichi Suzuki announcing he plans to return three stolen artifacts belonging to Sakamoto Ryōma: the letter, a cup with Ryōma's blood, and the pistol; during the Ryōma exhibition. Jirokichi persuades the owner of Ryōma's items, Shishihiko Tarumi, to host the exhibition in his museum while he sets up a trap to capture Kid. Sonoko, Ran, and Conan visit Jirokichi for more details. While there, they receive a second notice from Kid who announces his heist will take place the following day and quotes Ryōma on his plans to clean up. Conan deduces Kid ascertained the day due to the forecasted rain and advises Jirokichi to install metal detectors in the museum.
628	23	"Conan & Kid's Battle For Ryoma's Treasure (Part 2)"; Transliteration: "Conan Kiddo no Ryōma Otakara Kōbō-sen (Kōhen)" (Japanese: コナンキッドの龍馬お宝攻防戦（後編）)	Yasuichiro Yamamoto	N/A	August 27, 2011
On the day of the heist, Conan is confronted by Kid in the bathroom stalls who reveals he was able to bypass the metal detectors by removing the lead from the pistol. As Kid leaves, Conan overhears Tarumi and his appraiser hoping Kid succeeds in his plot. Kid appears at the announced time and publicly claims he is cleaning up before setting off the fire sprinklers; he blends into the crowd who are also soaked from the rain and makes his escape. The water washes off the description plates in the museum revealing messages from Kid detailing the items in the Ryōma exhibition are fake and how Tarumi had been creating forgeries and selling them to the black market. This is confirmed when they discover many identical copies of the letter, cup, and pistol returned by Kid. As evidence, the blood on the cup is revealed to belong to Tarumi's appraiser and partner in crime. Conan, after deducing Kid would be disguised as an obese man due to the number of objects he would be carrying, confronts him and lets him leave crediting it as a favor to Ryōma.
629	24	"The Promo Video Shooting Case (Part 1)"; Transliteration: "Puromobideo Satsuei Jiken (Zenpen)" (Japanese: プロモビデオ撮影事件（前編）)	Shigeru Yamazaki	Atsushi Maekawa	September 3, 2011
Conan, Ran, Sonoko and the Detective Boys are invited to a small island resort for diving lessons. While exploring the island, they find a filming crew lead and directed by Yuuya Miyasaka, an actor who lost his fame due to assault causing the drama he starred in to cancel. When the weather turns bad, they all return to the resort. Later, Miyasaka is found dead in his room. The resort staff, film crew excluding Miki Kitagawa, and Conan's company meet in the lobby to discuss the identity of the murderer. Due to the rooms having an automatic lock when closed, they conclude Miyasaka had let the perpetrator into his room and suspects it to be the work of one of the crew members.
630	25	"The Promo Video Shooting Case (Part 2)"; Transliteration: "Puromobideo Satsuei Jiken (Kōhen)" (Japanese: プロモビデオ撮影事件（後編）)	Akira Yoshimura	Atsushi Maekawa	September 10, 2011
Kitagawa returns to the lobby and exclaims she saw Shingo Takayama, the cameraman, fleeing from the resort. Led by Kitagawa, they find Takayama's body off a cliff. After investigating Miyasaka's body and the camera which recorded the first instance the body was found, Conan realizes who the culprit. After tranquilizing and impersonating Sonoko, he reveals Miki Kitagawa as the culprit. He reveals that the instance they found Miyasaka, he was feigning death as a prank. After everyone except Kitagawa goes to the lobby, she committed the murder and exchanged the knife, evidenced by the stains on the knife's handle. She then proceeded to murder Takayama who was an accomplice to Miyakasa's prank to hide her alibi. Kitagawa confesses and reveals her as vengeance after her first big role as an actor was denied after Miyakasa caused the show to drama to be canceled.
631	26	"What the Flower Clock Knew"; Transliteration: "Hana Tokei wa Shitte Ita" (Japanese: 花時計は知っていた)	Tomomi Ikeda	Masaki Tsuji	September 17, 2011
For the past few days, Ayumi has been practicing her baton throws in the local park and has noticed a strange man watching her. One day while accompanied with her friends, the strange man is found dead. The police conclude it to be an accidental death after he fell from climbing the infrastructure. Since the victim was found with a cut on his face on the 6 of the floral clock, they presume the death to be at 4:30. Conan realizes the victim, Shousaku Yoda, is not the strange man and that the murderer impersonated him to have the Detective Boys become witnesses to his death. The police investigate Kyouichirou Kawaguchi, a man who bears a grudge against the victim, but has an alibi for the presumed time of death. After Conan investigates, he gathers the police and reveals Yoda's time of death was false. Kawaguchi murdered Yoda on the 6 but climbed across the clock to scratch his face on the 12. As certain proof he is the culprit, Conan reveals Yoda wrote Kawaguchi's name in paint in the clock's maintenance room.
632	27	"The Guardian of Time's Sword (Part 1)"; Transliteration: "Toki no Bannin no Yaiba (Zenpen)" (Japanese: 時の番人の刃（前編）)	Minoru Tozawa	N/A	October 1, 2011
A threatening letter signed "the Guardian of Time" warns that Rukako Hoshina, the mistress of a large mansion with a clock tower, will be murdered during her birthday party at 6:00 pm. Kogoro and Conan goes to protect her but fails. It appears that the culprit stabbed her with an ice pick and fled from the balcony, but shoe prints and the murder weapon are never found. According to witness testimonies, the culprit is in a dress who moved nimbly, yet is plump and of a large build, yet no one in the party matches the description.
633	28	"The Guardian of Time's Sword (Part 2)"; Transliteration: "Toki no Bannin no Yaiba (Kōhen)" (Japanese: 時の番人の刃（後編）)	Koichiro Kuroda	N/A	October 8, 2011
Conan deduces that Hoshina was stabbed with an umbrella, which fitted the description perfectly. A contraption on the mansion's clock tower set up by the culprit dragged the umbrella away and out of sight when it hit 6:00. The culprit is one of the party guests, Teigo Karube, who had designed this mansion and lost his clock technician friend four years ago. He reveals that the mistress treated the clock technician like trash and even threw away his friend's beloved clock, so he killed her in order to avenge his friend.
634	29	"The Super Narrow Shop Crime Scene"; Transliteration: "Hankou Genba wa Geki Sema Ten" (Japanese: 犯行現場は激セマ店)	Nobuharu Kamanaka	Junichi Iioka Yu Kaneko	October 15, 2011
Kogoro celebrates at a bar after winning a horse race bet. He, and three customers, leave the bar for a short while before returning and finding the hostess has been killed by a knife. After Conan investigates, he reveals the culprit to be customer Masao Shinohara. Conan explains the hostess was knifed through a slit in the wall from the back of the bar and reattached the handle to the knife when he and the others discover her body. Since the distance from the ATM to the back off the bar is considerably short, his alibi is annulled. As evidence he is the culprit, Conan reveals the rust from the knife will match the one found on his ATM receipt. Shinohara confesses and reveals the hostess had been blackmailing him to steal fish from the factory.
635	30	"Beware of Dieting"; Transliteration: "Daietto ni Goyoujin" (Japanese: ダイエットにご用心)	Akira Yoshimura	Tomoka Yamada	November 5, 2011
Ran, Sonoko, and Conan are at a yoga weight-lost resort when one of its customers, Atsuko Degawa, dies from poison found in her food. Originally deduced to be a suicide, Conan reveals the culprit as the resort's owner, Tsukiko Satoyama, who had poison laced on the plastic wrap which mixed with Degawa's food when it was re-heated in the microwave. After finding the poisoned plastic wrap on her dog, Satoyama confesses and reveals Degawa's negative reviews caused her parents' business to shut down and as a result, had her parents commit suicide.
636	31	"The Most Useful School in the World Case (Part 1)"; Transliteration: "Sekaiichi Uketai Jugyō Jiken (Zenpen)" (Japanese: 世界一受けたい授業事件（前編）)	Shigeru Yamazaki	Shigenori Kageyama	November 12, 2011
Kogoro is asked to star in an educational television program. Once there, he is introduced to guest stars and studio members. Noburo Kimijima, the leading figure of Enka, has his priceless vase stolen during rehearsal. They deduce the culprit is still inside the studio room.
637	32	"The Most Useful School in the World Case (Part 2)"; Transliteration: "Sekaiichi Uketai Jugyō Jiken (Kōhen)" (Japanese: 世界一受けたい授業事件（後編）)	Koichiro Kuroda	Shigenori Kageyama	November 19, 2011
After failing to find the vase in possible hiding spots, Conan realizes the vase has been smashed and reveals it is hidden inside the fanny pack of Kimijima's disciple, Shinobu Oki. Conan deduces her motive and has the guest star appraiser reveal the vase was a counterfeit and that Oki most likely destroyed it to prevent Kimijima from being humiliated on television. Oki confesses and reveals Kimijima's wife's dying wish was to prevent Kimijima from learning about the vase's real value. Kimijima accepts Oki's good intentions and reveals he made a deal with a producer who will help start Oki's debut as a singer.
638	33	"Solving Mysteries at the Red Leaf Palace (Part 1)"; Transliteration: "Momiji Goten de Nazo o Toku (Zenpen)" (Japanese: 紅葉御殿で謎を解く（前編）)	Makoto Fuchigami	Masaki Tsuji	November 26, 2011
Kogoro, Ran, and Conan are walking when they witness a car attempting to kill a girl and her chauffeur. After saving the two, they learn that the girl, Kaede Nakakita, is an adopted child of a wealthy man named Ouzaburou Katayose. Katayose invites the three to his estate to express his gratitude towards them. As Conan explores the estate with Nakakita, he finds evidence that someone wants to kill her and deduces the culprit is either Katayose's son, Ogito Katayose, or his daughter, Nobue Katayose who are after the inheritance. Later, Katayose is found dead after consuming poison in his tea. The chauffeur Eiko Suzuka, then reveals Katayose's will detailing the location of his red leaf treasure.
639	34	"Solving Mysteries at the Red Leaf Palace (Part 2)"; Transliteration: "Momiji Goten de Nazo o Toku (Kōhen)" (Japanese: 紅葉御殿で謎を解く（後編）)	Tomomi Ikeda	Masaki Tsuji	December 3, 2011
Nobue is found dead with a poisoned arrow in her back while holding a clean arrow in her hand. Ogito's crossbow is found near the scene leading the police to suspect him. Later, Ogito falls down a cliff due to being shocked by an electric fence. Conan, realizing how the events transpired, tranquilizes Kogoro and reveals how the three died. Katayose poisoned himself and hoped to frame his children in order to protect Nakakita from their greed. Nobue, seeking to increase her inheritance, set up the crossbow and held an arrow in her hand to frame Ogito for attempted murder, but was instead murdered by Ogito. Ogito meanwhile, figured out the location of the treasure which is placed inside a cross made of metal rods. As he attempted to remove the treasure, Suzuka re-activated the electric fence which unintentionally resulted in his death. As for the treasure, it reveals Katayose leaves his inheritance to Nakakita who is actually his blood-related granddaughter from his former love.
640	35	"The Memory Trip of the Eight Sketches (Okayama Part)"; Transliteration: "Hachimai no Sukecchi Kioku no Tabi (Okayama hen)" (Japanese: 8枚のスケッチ記憶の旅（岡山編）)	Minoru Tozawa	Junichi Miyashita	December 10, 2011
Kogoro, Ran, and Conan are invited to Okayama to review the food served there. They then meet an amnesiac woman and decide to assist her in regaining her memories. The woman sketches out pictures which gives them clues on locations she visited. The woman recognizes the sound of a suikinkutsu from a cellphone; the group deduces she visited the Salt Palace. There, she discovers her name to be Mayuko Kichise from her friend, Kanae Nonomiya. Nonomiya reveals Kichise is an important witness who can prove her brother did not rob a jewelry store and prompts her to regain her memories. Nonomiya tells them the location of Kichise's home where they find it had been searched and pictures of Kichise and her boyfriend were ripped. Later at a restaurant, Kichise receives a note demanding her to be alone if she wants her memories. She separates from the group and is approached by a masked stranger.
641	36	"The Memory Trip of the Eight Sketches (Kurashiki Part)"; Transliteration: "Hachimai no Sukecchi Kioku no Tabi (Kurashiki hen)" (Japanese: 8枚のスケッチ記憶の旅（倉敷編）)	Nobuharu Kamanaka	Junichi Miyashita	December 17, 2011
The masked stranger attempts to kill Kichise but is interrupted by Conan. The group continue following the locations suggested by the sketches and arrive in Kurashiki. After a second masked stranger's failed kidnapping attempt on Kichise, Conan finds a loan contract from the kidnapper and realizes the second masked stranger is a loan shark whom Nonomiya is indebted to. Nonomiya confesses and reveals she wants to use Kichise to locate the stolen jewelry. Conan deduces the first masked stranger is Kichise's boyfriend, pastry chef Kenzou Taira, who is the mastermind behind the robbery. Taira is taken into custody where Kichise was an accomplice who drove off with the jewels. Conan confronts Kichise at a coin locker subway station and convinces her to turn herself in along with the jewels.
642	37	"Grabbing Karuta Cards in Dire Straits (Part 1)"; Transliteration: "Karuta-tori Kikiippatsu (Zenpen)" (Japanese: カルタ取り危機一髪（前編）)	Shigeru Yamazaki	N/A	January 7, 2012
Conan is sick with a cold and receives a video call from the Detective Boys. During the call, the Detective Boys receive a plea from Masao Urafune to save him from the people posing as his parents. Disregarding Conan's advice to call the police, the Detective Boys decide to ask the neighbors about the Urafune family. They learn Masao is a compulsive liar and decide to ask him directly in his apartment on the premise of playing karuta. Meanwhile, the criminals threaten to kill Masao's mother if he attempts to reveal his situation to Detective Boys. As the game progresses, Masao plays in an aggressive manner but makes no effort to win, leading Haibara to realize he intends to use his cards to send a message.
643	38	"Grabbing Karuta Cards in Dire Straits (Part 2)"; Transliteration: "Karuta-tori Kikiippatsu (Kōhen)" (Japanese: カルタ取り危機一髪（後編）)	Koichiro Kuroda	N/A	January 14, 2012
Before Masao is escorted out of the room, he shouts "take out the towel" and declares the towel to have a pattern of a horsehair crab from Lake Suwa. Haibara examines Masao's cards which consist of Ru (る), Ko (こ), Ni (に), and Te (て) in that order. Haibara realizes Masao is telling them to take the words towel (タオル, ta o ru), horsehair crab (ケガニ, ke ga ni), and Lake Suwa (諏訪湖, Su wa ko), and to treat the middle characters as a Japanese particle. In doing so, Ru becomes Ta, Ko becomes Su, Ni becomes Ke, and Te remains unchanged. Reading the changed words from Masao's card order reveals the message Ta Su Ke Te (助けて, lit. "Help Me"). The criminals reveal they have been eavesdropping their conversation through a cellphone and decide to kill the kids as a result. Haibara deduces they are after the tax evasion evidence of a company whom was sent to a television producer from the previous resident of the Urafune household. Since the producer was murdered before the post office sent the package, it would return to the household after a number of days. The criminals are called by a postal worker and allow him into the apartment. The postal worker is revealed to be Takagi and is accompanied by Conan who apprehends the criminals; Conan reveals he realized Masao was telling the truth during the video call since Masao had a widow's peak, a dominant trait, while his imposter parents did not.
644	39	"Ramen So Good, It's to Die For (Part 1)"; Transliteration: "Shinu Hodo Umai Rāmen (Zenpen)" (Japanese: 死ぬほど美味しいラーメン（前編）)	Minoru Tozawa	N/A	February 4, 2012
Kogoro and Conan eat out at a ramen restaurant. Tokumori Saizu, the president of a real estate company, dies while beginning his meal due to poison. The police arrive and order Kogoro, Conan, and three suspects out of the shop while they investigate.
645	40	"Ramen So Good, It's to Die For (Part 2)"; Transliteration: "Shinu Hodo Umai Rāmen (Kōhen)" (Japanese: 死ぬほど美味しいラーメン（後編）)	Tomomi Ikeda	N/A	February 11, 2012
The police reveal poison was only found on the victim's left thumb and forefinger causing them to be dumbfounded on how poison was applied. Conan asks the police on what possessions the suspects have and eventually realizes how Saizu was killed. He tranquilizes Kogoro and reveals Atsushi Tanaka, Saizu's barber, as the culprit. He explains how poison is applied on the rim of the victim's glasses during his haircut. When Saizu cleaned his glasses due to condensation, the poison got onto his hand and into his mouth when he broke the chopsticks. After Saizu died, Tanaka exchanged his glasses with the victim's to hide the evidence. Tanaka confesses and reveals he murdered Saizu in the restaurant in order to have it close down and remodeled for greater success. A month later, the ramen restaurant reopens in a new location and becomes popular after changing its slogan.

== Home media release ==
Shogakukan/Being (Japan, Region 2 DVD)
Volume	Episodes^{Jp.}	Release date	Ref.
Volume 1	606–609	January 27, 2012	
Volume 2	610–613	February 24, 2012	
Volume 3	614–617	March 23, 2012	
Volume 4	618–621	April 27, 2012	
Volume 5	622–624, 631	May 25, 2012	
Volume 6	625–628	June 26, 2012	
Volume 7	629–630, 632–633	July 27, 2012	
Volume 8	634–637	August 24, 2012	
Volume 9	638-641	September 28, 2012	
Volume 10	642–645	October 26, 2012	
