= List of Case Closed volumes (61–80) =

Cover of Case Closed volume 71

The Case Closed manga, known in Japan as Detective Conan (名探偵コナン, Meitantei Conan), is written by Gosho Aoyama and serialized in Shogakukan's shōnen manga magazine Weekly Shōnen Sunday since January 19, 1994. Since Case Closed's premiere, over 1,000 chapters have been released in Japan, making it the 25th longest running manga series. Several adaptations based on Case Closed have been made, including an anime series and animated films. A database consisting of all the cases from the manga was launched in 2007. Viz Media announced its licensing of the series on June 1, 2004, and following Funimation Entertainment's English localization, released the series under the name Case Closed with renamed characters. The series follows high school detective Jimmy Kudo who was transformed into a child after being forced to swallow a poison.

The tankōbon volumes 61–80 contain chapters 631–850.

== Volumes ==
No.	Title	Original release date	English release date
61	Shoes to Die For	April 3, 2008; 978-4-09-121340-2	January 10, 2017; 978-1-4215-8684-7
631. "The Purple Nails" (紫紅の爪, Pāpuru Neiru); 632. "Teleportation" (瞬間移動, Shunkan Idō); 633. "The Three Taboos" (3つのタブー, Mittsu no Tabū); 634. "Zero" (Zero); 635. "Burn" (燃える, Moeru); 636. "Tinder" (火種, Hidane); 637. "Crackle" (バチバチ, Bachibachi); 638. "Paper Airplane" (紙飛行機, Kami Hikōki); 639. "Message" (メッセージ, Messēji); 640. "Rescue" (レスキュー, Resukyū); 641. "Destruction" (隠滅, Inmetsu)
Serena's uncle Jirokichi challenges the Kaito Kid to steal a pair of jeweled shoes called the Purple Nails in the center of a city intersection. When Kid arrives, nets cover the intersection seemingly trapping him, but Kid proclaims that he can teleport, and he soon disappears and reappears on a roof top. Since one of the shoes was a fake, he and Jirokichi arrange another challenge. Conan Edogawa tries to determine how Kid is able to move so quickly. The Junior Detective League and Dr. Agasa are on a road trip when their car runs out of gas. An arrogant driver of a luxury car on the way to the top of a hill refuses to help them, but then the driver is killed from a car explosion. His fiancee believes it was because he had lit up a cigarette in a gasoline-filled garage, but Conan suspects foul play. In another case, Conan and Subaru Okiya, a grad student who is living at Jimmy's place, try to deduce what is going on with a bunch of paper airplanes with peculiar markings that have appeared around town. They find it is a code by someone who had been abducted, and, with Rachel's help, scramble to find the person as the kidnapper had apparently committed suicide. The brother of Cafe Poirot's waitress Azusa becomes a suspect in a murder case, but Azusa reacts strangely to the news and then runs off in response to a package she received.
62	The Kudo Identity	August 11, 2008; 978-4-09-121464-5	April 11, 2017; 978-1-4215-8685-4
642. "False Friendship" (偽りの友情, Itsuwari no Yūjō); 643. "The Wings of Icarus" (イカロスの翼, Ikarosu no Tsubasa); 644. "Counterattack" (返し技, Kaeshi Waza); 645. "Lucky Chance" (ケガの功名, Kega no Kōmyō); 646. "Village of Hatred" (憎悪の村, Zōo no Mura); 647. "Lost Memory" (失われた記憶, Ushinawareta Kioku); 648. "Jimmy Kudo's Murder" (工藤新一の殺人, Kudō Shinichi no Satsujin); 649. "The Shiragami" (死羅神様, Shiragami-sama); 650. "Endless Tears" (止まらぬ涙, Tomaranu Namida); 651. "True Identity" (正体, Shōtai); 652. "What I Really Want to Ask" (ホントに聞きたいコト, Honto ni Kikitai Koto)
Conan helps Meguire, Richard and the detectives identify the real killer behind the murder of Azusa's brother's boss. Yuko Arisawa, a former judo champion, asks Eva Kaden to help find who has been stalking her husband, but when they return to her home, they find the husband has been murdered. Eva suspects Yuko did it but she has an alibi of being with the group at a restaurant. Rachel calls Richard to get involved. Later, a letter addressed to Jimmy requests his presence at a distant village. Conan follows the directions in the letter but is trapped in a cabin. Realizing he took the prototype antidote to APTX 4869, he escapes through the window and falls into a river. Jimmy is later found but he has amnesia and then he becomes the prime suspect in an attempted murder. Harley Hartwell tries to uncover the truth behind the amnesiac. Later, Harley and Jimmy investigate a man who was strangled while driving on the highway.
63	Conan Dreams of Sushi	November 7, 2008; 978-4-09-121513-0	July 11, 2017; 978-1-4215-9444-6
653. "My Deduction" (オレの推理, Ore no Suiri); 654. "The Deduction Answered" (推理の答え, Suiri no Kotae); 655. "The Revolving Weapon" (回る凶器, Mawaru Kyōki); 656. "Target" (狙い撃ち, Nerai Uchi); 657. "The Whereabouts of the Poison" (毒物のありか, Dokubutsu no Arika); 658. "Boar, Deer, Butterfly" (猪・鹿・蝶, Ino Shika Chō); 659. "801, Bamboo Flute, Item" (八百一と尺八と一品, Happyaku-ichi to Shakuhachi to Ippin); 660. "The Purpose of the Tournament" (選手権の目的, Senshuken no Mokuteki); 661. "The Silver Witch" (銀白の魔女, Ginpaku no Majo); 662. "The White Car" (白のFD, Shiro no Efu Dī); 663. "The Witch's Identity" (魔女の正体, Majo no Shōtai)
Jimmy and Harley identify three suspects related to the man who was strangled while driving on the highway. Afterwards, Jimmy tries to excuse himself as he transforms back to Conan but Rachel will not let go of his hand. Agasa and the Junior Detectives are at a revolving sushi bar restaurant when an irritating food critic is poisoned with cyanide. Several guests and staff are suspect, but it is not clear how only one plate was poisoned and there was no poison on the suspects. Later, George's father participates in a competition for people who share his family name in order to win a rare hanafuda print, but when the host of the competition is murdered and three men, including George's father, become the suspects. Conan tricks the culprit into confessing allowing the police to identify the murderer. A ghost racer, dubbed the Silver Witch, is rumored to be causing accidents on a foggy mountain. Richard, with Rachel and Conan riding, races against the witch, but the car's tail lights seem to imply she can drive over a cliffside into the air. Conan narrows the suspect list to three pairs of drivers, and deduces who could have used the fog to create a mirage of driving in the air. The culprits attempt to escape the authorities but is caught by Miwako Sato who is revealed to be the original Silver Witch.
64	Old Scars	April 2, 2009; 978-4-09-121892-6	October 10, 2017; 978-1-42-159445-3
664. "Horn Rock" (一角岩, Ikkaku Iwa); 665. "Mackerel, Carp, Sea Bream, Flounder" (サバ・コイ・タイ・ヒラメ, Saba Koi Tai Hirame); 666. "A Bad Feeling" (殺気, Sakki); 667. "Scar" (傷, Kizu); 668. "The Boy in the Memory" (思い出の少年, Omoide no Shōnen); 669. "Gari" (ガリ君, Gari-kun); 670. "The Whistling Man" (口笛の男, Kuchibue no Otoko); 671. "Connection" (つながり, Tsunagari); 672. ESWN"; 673. "A Stereotypical Scene" (よくあるパターン, Yoku Aru Patān); 674. "Iron Tanuki" (鉄狸, Tetsu Tanuki)
The Junior Detectives and Subaru Okiya visit an isolated island called Horn Rock reputed to be off limits where they discover the body of a stranded diver with a list of fish etched into a rock nearby. Conan determines which of the diver's colleagues is the suspect. A rich blind woman hires Richard to help her find a boy who had saved her many years ago, but had received a scar on his torso in return. With her offering a large cash reward, Richard has to determine which of two candidates is the boy. They discover that Superintendent McLaughlin is secretly surveying the manor to determine if the scarred man could be a serial killer who had scarred McLaughlin's face 15 years ago. Although Conan determines who the boy is, the trail goes cold for McLaughlin's attacker, until a psychologist publicly challenges the serial killer to come to his place before the statute of limitations expires. The psychologist is murdered at his computer with the large letter Z slashed on his back. Conan and Takagi determine how the victims were related and who the killer is. Jirokichi receives a note allegedly from the Kaito Kid declaring he will opening his impenetrable safe, the Iron Tanuki, but the note is not in the Kaito Kid's writing style. While demonstrating his security to Richard, he then receives a note by the real Kaito Kid that he will open the safe.
65	The Red Wall	August 18, 2009; 978-4-09-121717-2	January 9, 2018; 978-1-42-159689-1
675. "Infiltrated" (潜伏, Senpuku); 676. "Unlocked" (解錠, Kaijō); 677. "A Twist of Fate" (運命の人, Unmei no Hito); 678. "Trap" (罠, Wana); 679. "A Fluttering Heart" (揺れる心, Yureru Kokoro); 680. "The Dangerous Duo" (危険な2人連れ, Kiken na Futarizure); 681. "Half Dead" (半殺し, Hangoroshi); 682. "Red Wall" (赤い壁, Akai Kabe); 683. "In One's Grasp" (掌中, Shōchū); 684. "A Dead Kong Ming" (死せる孔明, Shiseru Kōmei); 685. "A Living Zhongda" (生ける仲達を走らす, Ikeru Chūdatsu o Hashirasu)
Conan deduces how the Kaito Kid snuck into the household to crack the safe. The Junior Detectives are at a bank when a robbery and hostage situation occurs with one of the captives being Jodie Starling. Conan deduces what the real intent is for the robbery. Later, Dr. Agasa and Anita get a ride into town but suspect their drivers could be criminals looking to kill Richard and Conan. It turns out the drivers are Nagano police detectives Kansuke Yamato and Yui Uehara and they need Richard to help investigate a murder where the victim had spray painted a wall red before his death. They suspect the victim's former housemates, who have colors in their names. Things get complicated when one of the housemates is killed in a similar fashion, and the original manor is burned to the ground while precinct inspector Takaaki Morofushi is investigating.
66	Cherry Blossom Confidential	November 18, 2009; 978-4-09-122048-6	April 10, 2018; 978-1-42-159708-9
686. "Perfect Bait" (絶妙好餌, Zetsumyō Kōji); 687. "Memories" (思い出, Omoide); 688. "Falling Cherry Blossoms" (サクラチル, Sakura Chiru); 689. "Blooming Cherry Blossoms" (サクラサク, Sakura Saku); 690. "The Monster House" (もののけ倉, Mononoke Kura); 691. "Conan vs. the Junior Detective League" (コナンvs探偵団, Konan Bāsasu Tantei-dan); 692. "The Secret of the Storehouse" (倉の秘密, Kura no Himitsu); 693. "Operation Charm Retrieval!" (お守り奪還作戦, Omamori Dakkan Sakusen); 694. "A Great Game" (最高の試合, Saikō no Shiai); 695. "Mean" (意地悪, Ijiwaru); 696. "Gothic Lolita" (ゴスロリ, Gosu Rori)
Conan and the Nagano officers bait and capture the red wall murderer. Santos, who had a crush on Sato because she resembled a kind girl from her childhood, goes to the movies and runs into the Junior Detectives. He meets a woman that could be the childhood girl, but when the woman asks him to check up on her boyfriend at her home due to a stalker, they discover the man has been murdered. The Junior Detectives investigate a warehouse that appears to house a treasure if viewed from a top window, but when opening the front doors it is empty. Harley and Kazuha travel to Tokyo to search for a university student whom Harley gave Kazuha's good luck charm to. Kazuha wants to retrieve the charm before Harley can check that it contains a photo of him. They find the student had been assaulted in a sports bar. Later, Richard and Conan go along with Rachel and Serena for shopping. At a restaurant, they see a woman dressed up in a Gothic Lolita fashion. The same woman is later found dead in a restroom stall.
67	Fashion Emergency	February 18, 2010; 978-4-09-122146-9	July 10, 2018; 978-14215-9860-4
697. "The Fashion Curse" (呪いのファッション!?, Noroi no Fasshon!?); 698. "Something Fragile and Unsure" (不確かでもろい物, Futashika de Moroimono); 699. "There's Still Tomorrow" (明日があるさ, Ashita ga Aru sa); 700. "A Dangerous Area" (危険なエリア, Kiken na Eria); 701. "The Clues of Red and 13" (赤と13の暗示, Aka to Jū-san no Anji); 702. "The Bomber's Aim" (爆弾犯の狙い, Bakudan-han no Nerai); 703. "The Truth in the Blizzard" (吹雪の中の真実, Fubuki no Naka no Shinjitsu); 704. "A Silent Battle" (静かなる戦い, Shizuka Naru Tatakai); 705. "Ms. Kobayashi's Love" (小林先生の恋, Kobayashi-sensei no Koi); 706. "Ms. Kobayashi's Misunderstanding" (小林先生の誤解, Kobayashi-sensei no Gokai); 707. "Cherry Blossom Girl" (桜の少女は？, Sakura no Shōjo wa?)
Conan solves the mystery of how a Gothic Lolita girl was murdered in a restroom far from the restaurant where she and her friend were to meet. The Junior Detectives meet an elderly man who seems to have a lot on his schedule, but is actually planning on committing suicide. Richard is hired to investigate the sender of a set of red shirts at the mall. They encounter a man who is wearing explosives and that they have to solve the mystery of the red shirts or the entire floor will be destroyed. After hearing rumors that Shuichi Akai might have survived, the Black Organization wait outside the mall to snipe him (and kill Kir for failing to kill him before). Ms. Kobayashi witnesses a murder of a pawn shop owner and is questioned by Tokyo Metropolitan Police. While there, she overhears that Santos only likes her because she looks like Sato. She denies the story of how they met as kids.
68	The Kirin's Horn	May 18, 2010; 978-4-09-122290-9	October 9, 2018; 978-14215-9861-1
708. "Blooming Cherry Blossoms" (桜, 満開, Sakura, Mankai); 709. "The Misfortunes of Eva Kaden" (妃英里の災難, Kisaki Eri no Sainan); 710. "High Hopes and Disappointments" (落として上げる?, Otoshite Ageru?); 711. "The Best Birthday" (最高の誕生日, Saikō no Tanjōbi); 712. "Azure Dragon" (青龍, Seiryū); 713. "Vermilion Bird" (朱雀, Suzaku); 714. "White Tiger" (白虎, Byakko); 715. "Black Tortoise" (玄武, Genbu); 716. "Tori-no-Ichi Fair" (酉の市, Tori no Ichi); 717. "The Clues of Monkey and Nine" (猿と9, Saru to Kyū); 718. "Naive and Innocent" (天真爛漫, Tenshinranman)
The murderer of the pawn shop owner hopes to silence Ms. Kobayashi at her school, but is caught by police when it is revealed Sato was disguised as her. When Santos recites verbiage from the self-defense article, Ms. Kobayashi is reminded of their childhood meeting; they reconcile and start dating. Rachel tries to reunite her parents on a hotel vacation because she thinks Richard has bought Eva a birthday present. Eva agrees to attend because she can meet her client at the hotel who is dealing with a legal settlement. However, after dinner, the client is found dead under her hotel bed. Conan drops hints for Richard to allow him to solve the case. Jirokichi tries to stop Kaito Kid into stealing a jewel called the Kirin's Horn by hiring Conan and the Junior Detective League to protect it inside a temple room. But when the horn is stolen and Conan is knocked out, the Junior Detectives must find out which of the people present has disguised themselves as the Kid. At a Tori no ichi festival, Serena becomes the victim of a serial purse thief disguised in a hyottoko mask while Rachel restrains herself as she had received a fortune that says that the guy that likes her prefers ladylike girls who do not fight. The next week, when the purse thief has apparently stabbed a guy who communicates the words "monkey" and the number "nine" before losing consciousness, Conan and the girls puzzle over three possible suspects.
69	The Shape of Murder	August 18, 2010; 978-4-09-122500-9	January 8, 2019; 978-14215-9867-3
719. "The Client from the Deep" (沼底からの依頼, Numazoko kara no Irai); 720. "The Curse of the Kappa" (河童の呪い, Kappa no Noroi); 721. "The Identity of the Kappa" (河童の正体, Kappa no Shōtai); 722. "Murder in the Steam" (湯けむりの殺人, Yukemuri no Satsujin); 723. "A Locked Room on a Lake" (湖上の密室, Kojō no Misshitsu); 724. "An Eye for an Eye" (目には目を, Me ni wa Me o); 725. "The White Day Murder" (ホワイトデーの殺人, Howaito Dē no Satsujin); 726. "A Miraculous Trick" (ミラクルなトリック, Mirakuru na Torikku); 727. "Happy White Day" (ハッピーホワイトデー, Happii Howaito Dē); 728. "Air on the G String" (G線上のアリア, Jī Senjō no Aria); 729. "Genius" (天才, Tensai)
Richard receives a request to solve the drowning of a boy eleven years prior at an inn. During their stay, the boy's father is later found dead there, having drowned in a small basin of swamp water. Rachel thinks she saw a Kappa creature near the river earlier. Agasa takes the Junior Detectives to a resort known for their lakefront hot springs so he can fix one of the inventions he sold the owner; they meet some actors that are starring in a hitman drama film. However, the screenwriter is found dead in the locked hot springs bath area. Later, Richard stars in a commercial for White Day chocolates and is invited to the company party. There, the company president is murdered, but his wife seems to have an alibi by doing palm reading with Rachel. The Junior Detectives are stranded on a mountain road after Agasa's car breaks down. They take shelter from the rain in a house where they discover a mysterious piano player and a diary in which it is written plans to kidnap and murder a boy.
70	You're History	November 18, 2010; 978-4-09-122658-7	April 9, 2019; 978-14215-9868-0
730. "The Secret of the Diary" (日記の秘密, Nikki no Himitsu); 731. "Ryoma" (龍馬, Ryōma); 732. "Breakthrough" (突破, Toppa); 733. "Cleansing" (洗濯, Sentaku); 734. "The Hound" (魔犬, Maken); 735. "Ghost" (怨霊, Onryō); 736. "The Inubushi Family" (犬伏家, Inubushi-ke); 737. "Spheres" (玉, Tama); 738. "Prints" (足跡, Ashiato); 739. "Princess" (姫, Hime); 740. "The Eight Virtues" (仁義八行, Jingi Hakkō)
The Junior Detectives find the missing boy and reconstruct the diary pages revealing the kidnapping motive and what happened to the kidnapper. The Kaito Kid sends a notice announcing he will return three possessions of Sakamoto Ryoma that were stolen by a Phantom Thief Lady before, at Jirokichi's museum where they will show Ryoma's gun belt. Although Jirokichi's exhibitor does not seem to be worried about that the gun belt being stolen, Jirokichi prepares security anyway. When Kid does return the items, he reveals a larger conspiracy by the exhibitor and his appraiser to sell forged items. Harley and Kazuha visit Conan and Rachel in order to investigate the love children heirs of the Inubushi conglomerate, two of whom have mysteriously died after having seen a glowing spectral hound (like in Sherlock Holmes' Hound of the Baskervilles). They visit an heir who happens to be named Shinichi Kudo, but Shinichi is apparently murdered in a room taped up with duct tape. At the Inubushi estate, they discover another heir has fallen off a cliff; Rachel and Kazuha are chased by the spectral hound, and the hound goes after another heir. Conan and Harley eventually deduce which of the heirs is responsible for the murders.
71	The Game Is Afoot	February 18, 2011; 978-4-09-122780-5	July 9, 2019; 978-1-9747-0655-6
741. "Video Memory" (思い出のVHS, Omoide no Bui Eichi Esu); 742. "The 13-Year-Old Message" (13年越しの想い, Jū-san'nen Goshi no Messēji); 743. "Holmes's Disciple" (名探偵の弟子, Hōmuzu no Deshi); 744. "Revelation" (黙示録, Mokushiroku); 745. "Love Means Zero" (ラブは0, Rabu wa Zero); 746. "Ask Holmes" (ホームズに聞け, Hōmuzu ni Kike); 747. "Holmes's Code" (ホームズの暗号, Hōmuzu no Angō); 748. "Another A" (もう1つのA, Mō Hitotsu no Ē); 749. "A Message from the Queen" (女王からのメッセージ, Joō kara no Messēji); 750. "The Real Target" (真の標的, Shin no Tāgetto); 751. "The Strength of a Queen" (女王の真価, Joō no Shinka)
Ms. Kobayashi asks the Junior Detectives to find an old crime prevention video. They are joined by Detective Chiba, who is looking for a message left on a video by former classmate Naeko Miike who he liked prior to going to their class reunion. Richard receives an offer from a rich English woman to travel to London to share his detective stories with her husband and friends. Conan joins them by boarding the airplane with Agasa and taking a temporary antidote to be Jimmy. At the Sherlock Holmes Museum, Apollo Glass, younger brother of tennis star player Minerva Glass, gives Conan a riddle he received from a strange man who proclaims the riddle to be an advance notice to a murder. Conan, Agasa, Richard and Rachel try to solve the clues, but when Conan accidentally uses Jimmy's voice and reveals to Rachel that Jimmy is also in London, he is forced to take the antidote to hide his identity. They piece together the clues on the message that direct them to locations all over London and that the killer is a serial bomber who plans to kill Minerva's mother at the Wimbledon finals.
72	In the Cards	June 17, 2011; 978-4-09-122898-7	October 8, 2019; 978-1-9747-0656-3
752. "A Troublesome and Difficult Case" (厄介な難事件, Yakkai na Nanjiken); 753. "Rescue Needed" (要救助者, Yōkyūjosha); 754. "A Dangerous Game" (危険なかくれんぼ, Kiken na Kakurenbo); 755. "Communication Code" (通話コード, Fūwa Kōdo); 756. "A Macabre Death" (ヤバイ死に様, Yabai Shi ni Zama); 757. "The Moving Corpse" (動く死体, Ugoku Shitai); 758. "The False Leg" (偽りの足, Itsuwari no Ashi); 759. "Cry Wolf" (オオカミ少年, Ōkami Shōnen); 760. "Horsehair Crab" (諏訪湖の毛ガニ, Suwa-ko no Kegani); 761. "The Truth in the Cards" (カルタの真実, Karuta no Shinjitsu); 762. "Guardian of Time" (時の番人, Toki no Ban'nin)
Thanks to Minerva and also to his parents, Conan is able to find Hades in the crowd, and stops him from detonating the bomb. When the Junior Detectives play kick the can in an abandoned warehouse, a small earthquake occurs, and then they hear someone making sounds that resemble an emergency code. They find two workers who claim to be inspecting the walls to prep for demolition, but suspect there may be a third person who is captured. While Richard is giving a speech at his university, Rachel, Serena and Conan are asked by a film student group to check out their haunted house display, but discover that one of their members has been murdered. While Conan is at home sick with a cold, a kid in Amy's apartment complex claims that he is being held by a couple that are not his real parents. After checking with neighbors, the Junior Detectives suspect he could be a boy who cried wolf but continue investigating because of Conan's remark. A wealthy woman who owns and maintains a large collection of clocks hires Richard to investigate a threatening letter she has received surrounding her birthday. At her birthday party gathering, a black out occurs and she is then found dead.
73	Out of Time	September 16, 2011; 978-4-09-123235-9	January 20, 2020; 978-1-9747-0961-8
763. "The Phantom of Time" (時の亡霊, Toki no Bōrei); 764. "The Tyrant of Time" (時の支配者, Toki no Shihaisha); 765. "Ramen to Die For" (死ぬほど美味いラーメン, Shinu Hodo Umai Rāmen); 766. "Ramen and Poison" (ラーメンと毒薬, Rāmen to Dokuyaku); 767. "The Truth Behind the Glasses" (眼鏡越しの真実, Megane Goshi no Shinjitsu); 768. "Jeet Kune Do" (截拳道, Jī Kun Dō); 769. "A Detective Like You, Kid" (ボウヤと同じ探偵, Bōya to Onaji Tantei); 770. "Sera's Careless Deduction" (世良の迂闊な推理, Sera no Ukatsu na Suiri); 771. "Let's Hear Your Deduction!" (名推理を聞かせろ!, Meisuiri o Kikasero!); 772. "Nickname Rules" (あだ名の法則, Adana no Hōsoku); 773. "Ready, Aim, Fire!" (狙撃可能!, Sogeki Kanō!)
A woman is stabbed at her birthday party at her estate, and the suspect apparently escaped out the balcony, but with it raining outside, there are no footprints. Rachel thinks it could be the ghost of the woman's clock tower mechanic who died four years prior. Later, Richard and Conan go to a ramen shop in a district where a real estate businessman wants to run the shop out of business so that the district can be gentrified. However, the businessman dies while eating a ramen bowl, so Richard and Conan must determine who poisoned him and how. Rachel, Serena and Conan are on the way to a hotel for a pastry buffet when someone gropes Serena on the bus. Rachel fights the suspected assailant but the person is skilled at jeet kune do and the person actually points out the real assailant. At the hotel, a man seemingly commits suicide by falling off a building rooftop. The person from the bus tries to solve the mystery, using an elaborate scheme involving wires, a wheelchair, and the elevator, but gets help from Jimmy Kudo. The person is later revealed to be Rachel's new classmate, a girl named Masumi Sera. Three women enter Richard's office, followed by a man who then holds everyone at gunpoint (and then with an explosive belt) unless Richard can solve the mystery of which of the women murdered his sister. The clue to the murderer comes from his sister's final blog, detailing her visit from an elephant, rat, and fox – nicknames of the women. Conan tries to remotely help as Jimmy over the phone.
74	An Eye for an Eye	December 14, 2011; 978-4-09-123428-5	April 14, 2020; 978-1-9747-0962-5
774. "An Unreadable Book" (ページをめくれない本, Pēji o Mekurenai Hon); 775. "Streaming Video" (動画サイト, Dōga Saito); 776. "Pot and Cat" (壺と猫, Tsubo to Neko); 777. "Signs of Amy" (歩美の痕跡, Ayumi no Konseki); 778. "Who's the Sleuth?" (どっちが名探偵なんだ?, Dotchi ga Meitantei Nanda?); 779. "Abe-chan" (阿部ちゃん); 780. "A Magical Dish" (魔法の料理, Mahō no Ryōri); 781. Eye"; 782. "Baumkuchen" (バームクーヘン, Bāmukūhen); 783. "Crazy Diamond" (菱形と菱形, Hishigata to Hishigata); 784. "An Investigation and a Pledge" (誓いの実況見分, Chikai no Jikkyō Kenbun)
Jimmy gets the gunman to hesitate on which woman murdered his sister, allowing Rachel and Masumi to disarm him. After he is taken away, Jimmy identifies the culprit. The Junior Detectives and Dr. Agasa are having curry, but when some of them return from buying more ingredients, they find Dr. Agasa was knocked out and Amy has been kidnapped with a ransom text message to find a missing cat. The suspects are visitors interested in Agasa's vase, while Anita suspects they could be after her. Harley and Kazuha join Conan, Rachel, Masumi, Richard, and Agent Camel (FBI) in investigating the case of a man who died from poisoning in a family restaurant restroom stall. Harley receives a letter from someone associated with a prior murder of a businessman named Mr. Wakamatsu, and that Kazuha had visited the place once before as a test of courage and saw a mysterious man with the word "Eye" scratched into the bathroom tile. They meet the widowed wife and son and investigate the villa while they have a gathering with the colleagues and house staff. When the son dies from a poisoned piece of baumkuchen cake, Meguire and Takagi get involved, and the gang search for where the cyanide could have been delivered.
75	More Moores	April 14, 2012; 978-4-09-123738-5	July 14, 2020; 978-1-9747-1495-7
785. "The Mistress's Confession" (奥様の告白文, Oku-sama no Kokuhakubun); 786. "The Family Illusion" (親子の間の錯視, Oyako no Aida no Sakushi); 787. "Mr. Moore Is a Good Man" (小五郎さんはいい人, Kogorō-san wa Ii Hito); 788. "The Real Sleeping Moore" (本物の眠りの小五郎, Honmono no Nemuri no Kogorō); 789. "Fake Moore's Deduction" (偽小五郎の名推理, Nise Kogorō no Meisuiri); 790. "Detective Chiba's First Love" (千葉刑事の初恋の人, Chiba Keiji no Hatsukoi no Hito); 791. "Don't You Remember?" (覚えてませんか?, Oboetemasen ka?); 792. "Are You...?" (君ってもしかして..., Kimitte Moshikashite...); 793. "Private Eye" (プライベートアイ, Puraibēto Ai); 794. "Genome" (遺伝子情報, Genomu); 795. "The Flames of Fate" (炎へと回帰する運命, Honō e to Kaiki Suru Unmei)
Ms. Wakamatsu is found dead in a locked room along with items brought by her servants and close contacts. Harley and Conan determine which of her associates is the culprit as well the murderer of her stepson. When Rachel rants to Masumi and Serena about how irresponsible her father is, a landlady vouches that Richard has been doing good. But Rachel sees he's actually an impersonator who claims to be her granddaughter's boyfriend, and has been helping out with her cases which are mostly handyman work. One of the woman's tenants is found dead in his apartment after complaints that his television was playing at a loud volume; his neighbors become suspects. Conan gets the fake Richard to solve the case. The Junior Detectives help Detective Chiba investigate a series of car vandalisms where the interior was sprayed with the words "drop dead". With help from Yumi, they try to pair Chiba up with Naeko Miine, and find another situation where a vehicle hits another vehicle and is then similarly vandalized in the parking garage. Richard, along with Rachel and Conan, throws a party for his high school friend Raita and his fiancee Hatsune, but after she leaves to get her nails put on, she is caught in a car explosion and dies. They discover that both Raita and Hatsune have hired private detectives including Toru Amuro to spy on each other. Conan discovers the cold truth about their findings. Afterwards, Toru persuades Richard to be his teacher.
76	Detectives’ Nocturne	June 18, 2012; 978-4-09-123738-5	October 13, 2020; 978-1-9747-1700-2
796. "A Meeting at Columbo" (コロンボでの待ち合わせ, Koronbo de no Machiawase); 797. "Lies and Mysteries Intertwined" (縒り合わせられた噓と謎, Yori Awase Rareta Uso to Nazo); 798. "Detectives' Nocturne" (探偵たちの夜想曲（ノクターン）, Tantei-tachi no Yasōkyoku (Nokutān)); 799. "A Child's Curiosity, A Detective's Inquiring Mind" (子供の好奇心と探偵の探究心, Kodomo no Kōkishin to Tantei no Tankyū Kokoro); 800. "Crisscrossing Motives" (立体交差の思惑, Rittai Kōsa no Omowaku); 801. "The One Who Didn't Laugh" (全然笑わない人, Zenzen Warawanai Hito); 802. "Wipe That Look off Your Face" (そんな顔をするな..., Sonna Kao o Suru na...); 803. "What the Distortion Showed" (曲解の結末, Kyokkai no Ketsumatsu); 804. "A Gift from Detective Takagi" (高木刑事からの贈り物, Takagi Keiji Kara no Okurimono); 805. "The Wataru Brothers" (ワタル・ブラザーズ, Wataru Burazaazu); 806. "The Succession of the Rising Sun" (継承された旭影, Keishōsareta Kyokuei)
Richard is hired to locate a locker in which he is given a key. However, conflicting text messages from different phone numbers direct him to meet at the restaurant or the office. He, Rachel, Conan, and Toru return to the office to find a woman, Kei Kashitsuka, tied up and a man who had just shot himself in the head. As they investigate Kei's apartment, they start connecting her to a bank robbery in which her brother was killed. After Conan pretends to have been knocked out by Kei's spiked drink, he helps Kei identify the third participant in the robbery. The Junior Detectives and Dr. Agasa attend a barbeque lunch hosted by a couple they had previously met camping, but the couple seems to get in a lot of heated arguments. The woman is about to stab the man but is stabbed by him and is taken to the hospital in critical condition. Conan tries to piece together what happened that it would lead to such an attack. When Detective Sato gets a mysterious computer tablet showing Detective Takagi being tied up on a high wooden beam and a noose around his neck, she and the Junior Detectives are on a race to find the location before he is dropped and hung to death. But somehow it its related to another police detective who shares his given name Wataru.
77	The Sign of the Three	September 18, 2012; 978-4-09-123806-1	January 12, 2021; 978-1-9747-1496-4
807. "The Greatest Mentor" (最強の先輩, Saikyō no Senpai); 808. "A Belated Gravesite Visit" (遅くなった墓参り, Osoku Natta Hakamairi); 809. "Signs of Being Home" (部屋にいた痕跡, Heya ni Ita Konseki); 810. "Foam, Steam and Smoke" (泡、蒸気と煙, Awa, Jōki to Kemuri); 811. "Tool of the Trade" (商売道具, Shōbai Dōgu); 812. "Booker Kudo's Cold Case" (工藤優作の未解決事件, Kudō Yūsaku no Mikaiketsu Jiken); 813. "Johnny" (金一君, Kin'ichi-kun); 814. "Right, Conan?" (コナン君だよね？, Konan-kun Dayo ne?); 815. "No Trespassing" (自分の領分, Jibun no Ryōbun); 816. "Smoke Signal" (窮地の烽煙, Kyūchi no Hōen); 817. "The Lonely Figure in the Light" (灯下の孤影, Tōka no Koei)
Takagi's kidnapper commits suicide, leaving the police and the Junior Detectives to try to piece together where Takagi is based on the video stream. A tabloid publisher falls from his high-rise apartment; Anita, Conan, and Subaru join detective Takagi to investigate three employees who also live there and who received the publisher's last text messages. The suspects have alibis of having prepared freshly made drinks beforehand. Rachel, Serena and Sera find a dead guy next to a vending machine but with a kanji symbol for death written in blood next to him. As it reminds them of a case that Jimmy's father Booker gave up on ten years ago, they visit Jimmy's house to look for similar evidence. The Junior Detectives go camping with Dr. Agasa. While Conan and Agasa go to get supplies and end up meeting Sera at the shop, the others spot someone trying to bury a body and escape into a room cabin, but they are locked in by the suspect and the cabin is set on fire. Conan and Sera determine which of the other camper suspects is the culprit, while Anita secretly transforms into her adult form to rescue the kids. Toru Amuro sneaks into Richard's office to garner better clues about Shiho/Anita's identity, but Subaru is also watching over the attempt.
78	Mystery Train	December 18, 2012; 978-4-09-124031-6	April 13, 2021; 978-1-9747-2060-6
818. "Mystery Train (Departure)" (ミステリートレイン（発車）, Misuterii Torein (Hassha)); 819. "Mystery Train (Tunnel)" (ミステリートレイン（隧道）, Misuterii Torein (Zuidō)); 820. "Mystery Train (First Class)" (ミステリートレイン（一等）, Misuterii Torein (Ittō)); 821. "Mystery Train (Crossing)" (ミステリートレイン（交差）, Misuterii Torein (Kōsa)); 822. "Mystery Train (Break)" (ミステリートレイン（遮断）, Misuterii Torein (Shadan)); 823. "Mystery Train (Smoke Trail)" (ミステリートレイン（排煙）, Misuterii Torein (Haien)); 824. "Mystery Train (End of the Line)" (ミステリートレイン（終点）, Misuterii Torein (Shūten)); 825. "Special Coach" (スペシャルコーチ, Supesharu Kochi); 826. "Missing Key to the Locked Room" (消えた密室の鍵, Kieta Misshitsu no Kagi); 827. "The Key to the Case" (謎解きの鍵, Nazotoki no Kagi); 828. "Foam" (泡沫, Houmatsu)
Conan, Agasa, and the Junior Detectives join Richard, Rachel, Serena and Sera for a murder mystery game on a train. When one of the passengers is murdered for real, it is up to Conan and the gang to investigate it. However, members of the Black Organization have also boarded the train, which puts Anita in fear of her life. Conan and Richard join Rachel and Serena to a villa to play tennis, where there are a group of college students, but one of them dies in a locked room. Serena's uncle challenges the Kaito Kid to steal a gem that is attached to the back of a turtle.
79	Conan Edogawa's Dracula	April 18, 2013; 978-4-09-124291-4	July 13, 2021; 978-1-9747-2114-6
829. "Mimicry" (擬態, Gitai); 830. "Molting" (脱皮, Dappi); 831. "The Unlocked Locked-Room Murder" (情況的密室殺人, Jōkyōteki Misshitsu Satsujin); 832. "The Other Half" (二人で一人前, Futari de Ichininmae); 833. "The Teacher's Trick" (先生のトリック, Sensei no Torikku); 834. "The House of the Vampire" (吸血鬼の館, Kyūketsuki no Yakata); 835. "Count Dracula" (ドラキュラ伯爵, Dorakyura Hakushaku); 836. "Spirit Photography" (心霊写真, Shinrei Shashin); 837. "The Western Room" (南蛮部屋, Nanban Beya); 838. "Half of a Haunting" (怪奇現象の半分, Kaiki Genshō no Hanbun); 839. "Their Motives" (それぞれの動機, Sorezore no Dōki)
Conan figures out how the turtle with the gem on its back disappeared. Harley and Kazuha join Conan, Rachel, and Richard on a case where a man had apparently committed suicide in a locked room. They find the man had made some bad investments with a neighbor but when they see him in a rising elevator shooting himself in the head and suspect that to not be a suicide. They then join Inspector Otaki in investigating a manor where a maid had been found dead nearby with her blood drained supposedly by a vampire. When the master hasn't shown up but is known to have vampire-like behaviors (avoiding garlic, having coffins, hanging upside down and flying away), the gang look for clues until some of the sons and daughters are found dead.
80	Cold Case	July 18, 2013; 978-4-09-124324-9	October 12, 2021; 978-1-9747-2115-3
840. "The Killer's Plan" (殺人鬼の計画, Satsujinki no Keikaku); 841. "Undelivered Package" (未配達の荷物, Mi Haitatsu no Nimotsu); 842. "The Cat's Delivery Service" (猫の宅配便, Neko no Takuhaibin); 843. "Attention: Jimmy Kudo" (工藤様方宅配物, Kudō-samakata Takuhai-mono); 844. "Tonight's Fruit" (本日のフルーツ, Honjitsu no Furūtsu); 845. "Trespassing" (ボクらの領域, Bokura no Ryōiki); 846. "The Magic Key" (魔法の鍵, Mahō no Kagi); 847. "Until I Get All Seven" (7つ揃うまで, Nanatsu Sorou Made); 848. "A Prepared Outfit" (用意した一着, Yōi shita Icchaku); 849. "The Retired Regent's Crucial Move" (太閤の手筋, Taikō no Tesuji); 850. "Bourbon's Motive" (バーボンの目的, Bābon no Mokuteki)
Conan and Harley solve the manor mystery. The Junior Detectives follow a local feral cat but get stuck inside a refrigerated truck, but find that the drivers have stashed a corpse in a box. They try to contact someone outside without getting caught. Conan, Rachel, Richard, and Sera join Serena as audience members of a cooking competition, but the main judge is found dead in the locked chest of the secret ingredients. Yumi, Naeko, and the Junior Detectives are called over to an apartment complex where they find a woman who hung herself and a suicide note. While Conan suspects foul play, Yumi bumps into her ex-boyfriend. Agasa and the Junior Detectives meet Jodie at a cherry blossom viewing festival when a woman that bumped into Jodie earlier is found dead.
