= The Clash of Red and Black =

Story arcs of the manga Case Closed

The 58th tankōbon of Case Closed released by Viz Media on April 12, 2016, entitled The Clash of Red and Black, where some of the individual chapters of the arc is encapsulated. On the cover, Conan Edogawa is dressed as Shuichi Akai, a major character in the story arc.

The Clash of Red and Black (赤と黒のクラッシュ, Aka to Kuro no Kurasshu) are story arcs 170, 171, and 174–176 of the Japanese manga series Case Closed, which is referred to as Meitantei Konan (名探偵コナン, lit. Great Detective Conan, officially translated as Detective Conan) in Japan. The arc was published in Shogakukan's Weekly Shōnen Sunday from October 2006 to June 2007 from issues 44 to 25, and spanned 20 chapters of the manga, later encapsulated in tankōbon volumes 56–59 which were released in Japan from January 13 to October 18, 2007. To date, it is the longest story arc in Case Closed history.

The Case Closed anime adapted the arc into episodes 491–504 and was broadcast on Nippon Television Network System from January 14 to May 19, 2008. The arc follows Shinichi Kudo as he investigates the Black Organization with the FBI, and learns the truth behind the Hondo family. In the beginning of the series, Shinichi was poisoned and turned into a child. Since then, he had been using the identity Conan Edogawa whilst keeping his true identity a secret.

Viz Media localized and published the volumes from October 13, 2015, to July 12, 2016.

== Plot ==
Conan and his friends meet up with Eisuke Hondo, who is at a hospital, in search of his long-lost sister. The woman in question happens to bear a striking resemblance to a newscaster, Rena Mizunashi, raising suspicions that the two could be related to one another. Upon seeing a picture of Eisuke's sister, Koshi Anno, a fan of Rena, confirms her identity. To further prove this, he shows Eisuke a video of a news report, featuring her, where it is learned that Rena has type AB blood. However, being a type O, Eisuke denies that he is related to her, as he can only receive other type O blood in transfusions, which he claims to have received from his sister in the past.

Jodie Starling informs Conan that Eisuke's father, Ethan Hondo, was working as an agent for the Central Intelligence Agency (CIA), who had the mission of spying on the Black Organization until he was murdered by Rena (under the Organization codename Kir), who is suspected of posing as Ethan's daughter four years ago, in order to look into the CIA's investigation efforts. Conan learns from Ran that Eisuke found a person from his father's company at Haido Central Hospital, where Rena is currently hospitalized, who was recognized through an arrangement of touch tone notes on a phone, which happened to play the beginning of the children's song, Nanatsu no Ko (七つの子; lit. "Seven Children"), (Note: The song more commonly goes by the name "Seven Baby Crows", which is a strong clue to the leader of the Black Organization in future story arcs.) which is also the number of the Black Organization's leader.

Eisuke Hondo attempts to stab his sister, CIA agent Hidemi Hondo, who goes under the aliases "Rena Mizunashi" (outside of the Black Organization) and "Kir" (inside)

Fearing Rena's safety, Conan, along with Jodie and other Federal Bureau of Investigation (FBI) members, Andre Camel, James Black, and Shuichi Akai, make their way to investigate a fake patient sent to the hospital by the Organization. They are able to identify a man named Rikumichi Kusuda, faking a neck sprain, however, he flees by car, then later commits suicide by self-afflicted gunshot to avoid arrest. Afterwards, Eisuke enters Rena's hospital room, where he angrily attempts to stab her with scissors, before Rena stops grabs them. Conan appears to tells Eisuke that Rena is in fact his real sister, and that her real name is Hidemi Hondo, who is also a CIA agent. In the past, Ethan devised a scenario for his real daughter, Hidemi, as Kir, to murder him after their identities as CIA agents were known by the Organization. Conan, having learned that Eisuke had leukemia as a child, explains their blood relation, due to Hidemi's bone marrow being transplanted to Eisuke, to help with his condition, changing his blood type from O to AB in the process.

With the Organization's presence looming, the FBI plan to transport Rena to safety, using three decoy vans to stay out of their sight. Packages sent to hospital patients were believed to contain bombs from the Organization, which the FBI intercept. Unaware that the packages were actually transmitters, Gin becomes aware of Rena's location. Along with fellow Organization members, Chianti, Korn, and Vodka, who all tail the FBI's vans, Gin, using thermal technology, is able to determine which van contains Rena: the one that Camel is driving, which is being followed by Vodka. Rena renders Camel unconscious, causing the van to crash, and explode, with both of them fleeing the blast. Rena rejoins the Organization, which was revealed to be the FBI's plan all along, in order for Hidemi to continue her job of collecting information on the Organization from within.

Gin, back with Rena, asks her to set up a meeting with Shuichi on orders of the Organization's boss, or risk being labeled a traitor and killed, after Rena asks for the Organization to spare the lives of everyone in Haido Hospital, making Gin question Kir's loyalty. Once the two meet, Rena shoots Shuichi in the chest, before shooting him in the head, killing him. A bomb is then detonated, where authorities later discover a body, burned in the blaze, which was confirmed to be Shuichi after Conan's cellphone, containing Akai's fingerprints, was examined, matching that of the body.

== Production and release ==
The arc was published in Shogakukan's Weekly Shōnen Sunday magazine from October 2006 to June 2007 from issues 44 to 25 and consisted of 20 chapters, from chapter 585 to chapter 609. The individual chapters were then collected through tankōbon volumes 56–59 which were released in Japan from January 13 through October 18, 2007. Viz Media localized and published the volumes from October 13, 2015, to July 12, 2016. Volume 56 was localized as Season of The Witch, 57 as A Devil of a Case, 58 as The Clash of Red and Black, and 59 as Hair Today, Gone Tomorrow.

Although Gosho Aoyama was primarily writing this particular story arc at the time, from files 591–594, Aoyama decided to break from the major plot, with files 591–593 entitled The Devil of the TV Station, released from December 6, 2006, to January 1, 2007, and file 594 entitled The Fugitive, released on January 31, 2007, which were all encapsulated in volume 57. Before The Clash of Red and Black arc began, The Devil of the TV Station was adapted into the anime as episode 488, an hour-long episode, broadcast on October 22, 2007. Many years after the manga case was first published, The Fugitive was adapted as the fourth Case Closed TV special, entitled Fugitive: Kogoro Mori, first shown on the NOTTV app on April 23, 2014, before being shown on television on January 3, 2015, as Happy New Year, Kogoro Mori.

== Anime adaptation ==
The Clash of Red and Black story arc was aired on the Case Closed anime series as episodes 491–504 and was broadcast on Nippon Television Network System from January 14 to May 19, 2008, on Nippon Television Network System. Special opening and ending themes were created for this arc. The opening theme music was "Ai wa Kurayami no Naka de" (愛は暗闇の中で; lit. "Love is Within the Darkness") by Zard and the ending theme was "Yukidoke no Ano Kawa no Nagare no Yō ni" (雪どけのあの川の流れのように; lit. "Like the Flow of That River When the Snow Is Melting") by U-ka Saegusa in dB. Episodes 491, 492, 496, and 500 were directed by Minoru Tozawa, 493 by Nobuharu Kamanaka, 494 by Koichiro Kuroda, 495, 498, and 502 by Shigeru Yamazaki, 497 and 501 by Masahiro Hosoda, 499 by Koichiro Kuroda and Yuji Uchida, 503 by Yuji Uchida, and 504 by Masato Sato. The episodes were later encapsulated into four DVD volumes released from September 26, 2008, to February 27, 2009. On TV, all episodes of the arc ranked in the top ten anime watched during their respective week of broadcast.

Before the adaptation, a TV special entitled Black History (ブラックヒストリー 黒ずくめの組織との対決の歴史, Burakku Hisutorī Kuro-zukume no Soshiki to no Taiketsu no Rekishi; lit. "Black History: History of Confrontation with the Black Organization"), a clip show composed of snippets of 15 prior episodes, aired on December 17, 2007, in order for viewers to get caught up on the gist of the story involving the Black Organization up to this point. The episodes were (in the order they appeared in the special): The Mysterious Passenger, Roller Coaster Murder Case, The Black Organization: One Billion Yen Robbery Case, The Girl from the Black Organization and the University Professor Murder Case, Reunion with the Black Organization, The Battle Game Trap, The Man from Chicago, Shinichi Kudo's New York Case, Head-to-Head Match with the Black Organization: A Dual Mystery on a Full Moon Night, Black Impact! The Moment the Black Organization Reaches Out, Two People Who Can't Return, and The Shadow of the Black Organization. The special was followed by an airing of an edited version of episodes 309–311, Contact with the Black Organization.

== Reception ==
Volumes 57, 58, and 59 were among the top 3 best selling manga for the week of their release, with volumes 57 and 58 ranking 3rd, and volume 59 ranking 1st. AnimeLand reviewed volume 59 and called the arc a "must read" for the entire series.
