= Case Closed season 17 =

Season of television series

Case Closed
- Season 17
- The cover of the first DVD compilation for season seventeen of Detective Conan released by Shogakukan
- No. of episodes: 33

Release
- Original network: NNS (ytv)
- Original release: January 14, 2008 – February 2, 2009

Season chronology
- ← Previous; Season 16 Next → Season 18

The seventeenth season of the Case Closed anime was directed by Masato Satō (until episode 504) and Kōjin Ochi (since episode 505) and produced by TMS Entertainment and Yomiuri Telecasting Corporation. The series is based on Gosho Aoyama's Case Closed manga series. In Japan, the series is titled Detective Conan (名探偵コナン, Meitantei Conan). The North American English localization was titled Case Closed due to legal issues with the title Detective Conan. The series focuses on the adventures of teenage detective Shinichi Kudo who was turned into a child by a poison called APTX 4869, but continues working as a detective under the alias Conan Edogawa. At the start of the season, he works with the Federal Bureau of Investigation as they confront a criminal syndicate called the Black Organization before the episodes return to a more episodic formula.

The episodes use eight pieces of theme music: four opening themes and four ending themes. The first opening theme is "Ai wa Kurayami no Naka de" (愛は暗闇の中で, lit. "Love is Within the Darkness") by Zard until episode 504. The second opening theme is "Ichibyōgoto ni Love for You" (一秒ごとに Love for you, lit. "Every Second I Love for You") by Mai Kuraki until episode 514. The third opening theme is "Mysterious" by Naifu until episode 520. The fourth opening theme is "Revive" by Mai Kuraki starting episode 521 and through episode 523.

The first ending theme is "Yukidoke no Ano Kawa no Nagare no yō ni" (雪どけのあの川の流れのように, lit. "Like the Flowing of a Thawing River") by U-ka Saegusa in dB until episode 504. The second ending theme is "Summer Memories" by Aya Kamiki until episode 514. The third ending theme is "Go Your Own Way" by Yumi Shizukusa until episode 520. The fourth ending theme is "Koigokoro Kagayaki Nagara" (恋心 輝きながら, lit. "Shining with Awakened Love") by Naifu for the rest of the season.

The season initially ran from January 14, 2008, through February 2, 2009, on Nippon Television Network System in Japan. The English adaptation of the anime is licensed by Funimation Entertainment which has licensed the first one-hundred and four episodes. The season was later collected and released in ten DVD compilations by Shogakukan between September 26, 2008, and August 28, 2009, in Japan.

== Episode list ==
No.	No. in season	Title	Directed by	Written by	Original air date
491	1	"The Clash of Red and Black (The Beginning)"; Transliteration: "Aka to Kuro no Kurasshu (Hattan)" (Japanese: 赤と黒のクラッシュ （発端）)	Minoru Tozawa	Kazunari Kochi	January 14, 2008
Conan, Ran, and Sonoko are visiting a sick friend in the hospital. There they meet Eisuke who tells them he is searching for his long lost sister who looks identical to Rena Mizunashi. Eisuke explains that his sister intended to become a nurse so he is searching the local hospitals for her. Conan, however, suspects Eisuke knows Rena has been hospitalized due to her accident. The three decide to visit Kōshi Anno, a big fan of Rena, to confirm whether Rena is actually Eisuke's sister. Unable to contact Kōshi, they visit his mother and learn Kōshi recently called asking for money in order to pay off a rival company in a business meeting later that day. Listening to her story, Conan reveals the inconsistencies with Kōshi's story and reveals that a man is impersonating Kōshi in order to scam Kōshi's mother for money. As evidence, Conan explains that the fraud claimed to have canceled his planned vacation due to a cold but had business plans on the same day as his vacation; a person who had to suddenly cancel his vacation due to an illness would not have business plans on the same day. The fraud is later arrested outside of Kōshi's apartment. Later that day, Kōshi returns home and is confronted by Conan who asks him whether Eisuke's picture of his sister is actually Rena.
492	2	"The Clash of Red and Black (Blood Relative)"; Transliteration: "Aka to Kuro no Kurasshu (Ketsuen)" (Japanese: 赤と黒のクラッシュ （血縁）)	Minoru Tozawa	Kazunari Kochi	January 21, 2008
Kōshi confirms that the picture is indeed Rena and shows them a news recording depicting Rena with the same hairstyle as Eisuke's sister's in the photograph. In the video, they learn that Rena's blood type is AB. Eisuke denies that Rena is his sister since his sister's blood was once used for his blood transfusion; Eisuke has blood type O, meaning he can only receive Type O blood. Conan suspects there is a hidden component to Eisuke's story and believes Eisuke is searching for Rena with an ulterior motive. The next day, Eisuke invites Ran and Sonoko to accompany him to the mansion he used to live in to collect his mother's belongings which were recently found. Kogoro, coincidentally, was also hired to investigate a murder at the mansion that occurred a year ago. Once there, Eisuke finds his birth certificate, confirming that he has blood type O. Meanwhile, Kogoro is with the owner of the mansion, Kakuzō Okudaira, discussing the murder of his son, Tango Okudaira. Kakuzō tells Kogoro he suspects the murderer is one of three people in the mansion.
493	3	"The Clash of Red and Black (Exclamation)"; Transliteration: "Aka to Kuro no Kurasshu (Zekkyō)" (Japanese: 赤と黒のクラッシュ （絶叫）)	Nobuharu Kamanaka	Kazunari Kochi	January 28, 2008
Kakuzō shows Kogoro a photograph of Tango's body in a pool and points to a white glove Tango is wearing. He reveals that the glove was the same glove their previous butler wore before a car accident killed him, and that Tango's murder occurred on the anniversary of the butler's death. Kakuzō tells Kogoro that, three days after Tango's death, he received a white glove and now presumes the murderer plans to kill him next. After the discussion, Kogoro and Conan investigate the house searching for clues. When a blackout occurs and the sound of a vase is heard from Kakuzō's room, they arrive to find him hanged. Conan investigates and realizes three suspicious points: glue was used to keep the knot of the rope together, the broken vase with sweat near the top, and a book titled "Killer of Hades" (in kanji) with blood on it. The police declare that if the book is a dying message, the murderer must be one of the three suspects.
494	4	"The Clash of Red and Black (Hades)"; Transliteration: "Aka to Kuro no Kurasshu (Meido)" (Japanese: 赤と黒のクラッシュ （冥土）)	Koichiro Kuroda	Kazunari Kochi	February 4, 2008
Conan's investigation leads him to realize how Kakuzō and Tango's murder was accomplished. Conan tranquilizes Kogoro and impersonates him with the voice changing bow tie to reveal that Kikuyo Tabata, the maid, is the murderer. He reveals Kikuyo served Kakuzō coffee laced with sleeping pills, thus causing Kakuzō to fall asleep. She then set up the scene by placing Kakuzō on top of a trolley and placing a glued noose around his neck. After setting up a line of books leading from the door to the trolley Kikuyo placed a vase in Kakuzō's hand, warning him that if the vase dropped and broke, it would cause people to investigate the noise. When that happened, they would open the door to Kakuzō's room and subsequently move the line of books which would cause the trolley to roll out from beneath him and result in his death. Conan explains that Tango was murdered in a similar fashion: he was tied up and thrown in a pool and was forced to stand on the tip of his toes to breathe. Eventually Tango's fatigue caused him to drown. By delaying the time of death in both cases, Kikuyo was able to establish an alibi. As for the dying message, Conan reveals that blood covered the kanji for the English word "Hades" which means "Meido" in Japanese and is a reference to the English word maid. As evidence, Conan tells the police Kikuyo should have a handkerchief with coffee stains tainted with sleeping pills. Kikuyo confesses to the murder revealing that Tango, with the help of his father, murdered her husband, the previous butler.
495	5	"The Clash of Red and Black (Coma)"; Transliteration: "Aka to Kuro no Kurasshu (Konsui)" (Japanese: 赤と黒のクラッシュ （昏睡）)	Shigeru Yamazaki	Kazunari Kochi	February 11, 2008
Conan learns from Ran that she had been unable to contact Eisuke since the winter break. She tells him Eisuke last told her that he had found someone from his father's company at Haido Central Hospital, the same hospital in which Rena is currently hospitalized. Conan contacts Jodie Starling to inform her Eisuke may be searching for Rena and learns from her that Eisuke's father, Ethan Hondō, was a spy for the CIA who were investigating the Black Organization. She reveals that Rena and the Black Organization murdered him four years ago. Conan phones Ran asking her how Eisuke recognized the colleague. She replies that Eisuke recognized the person through the phones keypad tone which played the song "Nanatsu no Ko", the phone number of the Black Organization's leader. Conan realizes that a Black Organization member is in Haido Central Hospital. Fearing that the criminal syndicate may be close to finding Rena, Conan and the FBI investigate the hospital. After asking a nurse about a suspicious person, the FBI narrows the suspects list to hospitalized patients between December 18 and December 21 and begin their search for the Black Organization member.
496	6	"The Clash of Red and Black (Invasion)"; Transliteration: "Aka to Kuro no Kurasshu (Shinnyū)" (Japanese: 赤と黒のクラッシュ （侵入）)	Minoru Tozawa	Kazunari Kochi	February 18, 2008
The nurse tells Conan that she just remembered Eisuke had surgery for leukemia when he was young, raising the possibility Rena may in fact be his sister. Meanwhile, the FBI manages to narrow the list of suspects down to three patients: An old man with a broken leg, a man with a neck sprain, and a man with dorsalgia. Conan volunteers to secretly investigate them. After recording the three patients on a secret camera, Conan reports back to the FBI. In his meeting with the man with dorsalgia, Conan proved the man was not faking his symptom as he had difficulty bending down to pick up an object and was frantically fighting against a sneeze to prevent sending a shock wave to his back. The other two patients are revealed to be faking their symptoms. Conan reveals that he noticed the old man had a scar and swelling near his heart suggesting he has an artificial pacemaker. Since the pacemaker's function would be interrupted by cell phone waves, it rules the old man out leaving Rikumichi Kusuda, the man faking the neck sprain, as their culprit.
497	7	"The Clash of Red and Black (Awakening)"; Transliteration: "Aka to Kuro no Kurasshu (Kakusei)" (Japanese: 赤と黒のクラッシュ （覚醒）)	Masahiro Hosoda	Kazunari Kochi	February 25, 2008
That night Kusuda is caught sneaking into the nurse's lounge photographing the patient list and the FBI proceed to apprehend him. Kusuda reveals that under his cervical collar are explosives which he will detonate if they attempt to arrest him. He flees from the hospital in a car but is pursued by Conan and Akai. Kusudu kills himself with his own gun before being caught. While the FBI attempt to figure out how to keep the Black Organization away from Rena, Akai decides they must keep the hospital employees uninvolved and that he shall think of plan to ambush them. Later that night, Eisuke sneaks into Rena's room and attempts to question her about his sister. Frustrated with her comatose state, he attempts to stab her with scissors but she grabs his hand and stops him.
498	8	"The Clash of Red and Black (Disturbance)"; Transliteration: "Aka to Kuro no Kurasshu (Kakuran)" (Japanese: 赤と黒のクラッシュ （攪乱）)	Shigeru Yamazaki	Kazunari Kochi	March 3, 2008
The FBI plan on transporting Rena to another location in one of three identical vans, making the other two decoys. Later that day, James Black receives a flower from the deceased Kusada. Elsewhere, the Black Organization cause food poisoning throughout restaurants in the city, release poisonous gas in public areas, and start a fire in a local theatre. These incidents cause a large number of people needing medical attention to flow into the hospital. While Conan and Akai attempt to deduce the Black Organization plans, they notice a ticking sound from Jame's flower pot and realize there is a bomb in it. Agent Andre Camel and Jodie are given the task to detonate the bomb in an isolated location. After doing so, Akai notices there is a rush of deliveries to patients and realize they also contain explosives sent by the Black Organization.
499	9	"The Clash of Red and Black (Disguise)"; Transliteration: "Aka to Kuro no Kurasshu (Gisō)" (Japanese: 赤と黒のクラッシュ （偽装）)	Koichiro Kuroda Yuji Uchida	Kazunari Kochi	March 10, 2008
Rena appears on television while the FBI agents are gathering the small explosives which causes them to gather to Rena's room to investigate. They realize it was part of the Black Organization's plan as the explosives the agents were collecting contained transmitters; Gin, who watches the transmitters gather in a single location, tells his colleagues of Rena's location in the hospital. The FBI initiate their plan to transport Rena to another location. Camel is given the task of transporting Rena while the other FBI agents become decoys in the other two vans. Jodie suspects Camel is part of the organization and attempts to pursue Camel to give her the task of driving the van with Rena. Camel incapacitates her and hides her body. The three vans drive off with Chianti, Korn, and Vodka stalking them. Using thermal vision devices, they are able to see through the vans and upload the images to Gin who attempts to deduce which truck contains Rena. Vermouth follows Akai who is secretly tailing the second van, causing them to believe the truck Korn is stalking contains Rena. However, Gin stops them and reveals that Rena is in the van Camel is driving.
500	10	"The Clash of Red and Black (Testament)"; Transliteration: "Aka to Kuro no Kurasshu (Yuigon)" (Japanese: 赤と黒のクラッシュ （遺言）)	Minoru Tozawa	Kazunari Kochi	March 17, 2008
Rena wakes up and knocks Camel unconscious, causing the car to crash. Once freed, she reunites with the other members of the Black Organization. Chianti prepares to kill Camel, but the vehicle explodes, attracting the attention of the public and forcing the Black Organization members to flee. Camel, having survived the blast, reports to Akai and tells him the mission was a success. Akai reveals to the FBI he purposely let the Black Organization capture Rena again so they may use her to gain information from the inside. He then explains the conversation he and Conan had with Rena the night before. After Eisuke is stopped by Rena, Conan, who was hiding behind the curtains, reveals that Rena is indeed Eisuke's sister. He explains that due to Eisuke's leukemia and radiation treatment, they transferred Rena's bone marrow to Eisuke and essentially making his blood type AB. Conan reveals that he knows Rena is part of the CIA and was given the task of investigating the Black Organization from the inside. She reveals that on the day she and her father were supposed to reveal the Black Organization's identity to the public, she had a transmitter planted on her which resulted in them being caught. To protect his daughter, Ethan created a scenario in which Rena killed him after realizing his identity as a CIA agent. After having Rena shoot him, the Black Organization was fooled and Rena continued her duty to spy on the Organization. After the conversation, Akai tells Rena he plans to return her to the Black Organization.
501	11	"The Clash of Red and Black (Suspicion)"; Transliteration: "Aka to Kuro no Kurasshu (Kengi)" (Japanese: 赤と黒のクラッシュ （嫌疑）)	Masahiro Hosoda	Kazunari Kochi	April 14, 2008
Back in the present time, Rena asks Gin to spare the hospital and its employees, causing Gin to suspect her of being disloyal to the organization. Elsewhere, Professor Agasa takes the Detective Boys to a hotel restaurant. They run into Officer Takagi who tells them the president of a foreign talent agency was murdered only a few minutes ago. Takagi tells them that the suspect is an unknown foreigner who had an appointment with the president. Conan tells him that the suspect must be in the hotel still since the president's office is on the top floor and—with so little time—the suspect would not have had enough time to rid himself of the smell of gunpowder and escape the building. The police gather up three foreign suspects, one of which includes FBI Agent Camel. Camel is the prime suspect because of his physical features and refusal to answer the questions relating to his profession since the FBI's investigation in Japan must remain a secret. Conan calls Jodie to come and help prove Camel's innocence.
502	12	"The Clash of Red and Black (Innocence)"; Transliteration: "Aka to Kuro no Kurasshu (Keppaku)" (Japanese: 赤と黒のクラッシュ （潔白）)	Shigeru Yamazaki	Kazunari Kochi	April 28, 2008
Jodie arrives and tells the police that Camel is an FBI agent and that they are a couple vacationing in Japan. The police continue the investigation and notice that a memo with the words "Bring my Tux" was ripped out by an unknown culprit. Jodie asks Camel why he was in Japan two years ago. He replies that he was on a mission with Akai to investigate the Black Organization. He tells her that in the past, he made a mistake and exposed Akai's identity as an FBI agent to the syndicate and impeded Akai's mission as a spy. This indirectly resulted in the Organization murdering Akai's love, Akemi Miyano. Elsewhere, Gin orders Rena to set up a meeting with Akai or be branded as a traitor and subsequently killed. He tells her that he will plant a bug on her during the meeting and that it is her duty to kill Akai. Akai receives a call from Rena and agrees to meet with her, knowing that it is an ambush set up to take his life.
503	13	"The Clash of Red and Black (Ready to Die)"; Transliteration: "Aka to Kuro no Kurasshu (Kesshi)" (Japanese: 赤と黒のクラッシュ （決死）)	Nobuharu Kamanaka	Kazunari Kochi	May 12, 2008
Conan realizes why the culprit took the memo and tells Inspector Megure his plan to reveal the culprit. Megure gathers the four suspects and places chairs behind each of them. He then tells them to Shiran Puri (知らん振り, lit. Feign Ignorance) and all but Toby Kings sit down in their chairs. Jodie reveals that foreigners would recognize "Shiran Puri" as "Sit Down Please" and since Kings did not sit down, reveals he is actually Japanese. Jodie then explains that after Kings murdered the president, he noticed the memo and took it believing it was the President's dying message indicating Kings to be the murderer. As evidence, they find the missing memo inside Kings' pocket. Kings confesses to the murder and explains that his American girlfriend was tricked into signing a contract by the president. His girlfriend did not understand the contract since she was not fluent in Japanese; the contract forced his girlfriend to work long hours which in the end resulted in her death. As part of the contract, his girlfriend's younger brother would be held responsible if she is unable to continue working. Kings wanted to save his girlfriend's brother and thus murdered the president of the company.
504	14	"The Clash of Red and Black (Killed in the Line of Duty)"; Transliteration: "Aka to Kuro no Kurasshu (Junshoku)" (Japanese: 赤と黒のクラッシュ （殉職）)	Masato Sato	Kazunari Kochi	May 19, 2008
Akai meets with Rena who shoots him in the chest. He notices Gin's car in the distance and accepts his death so Rena may continue to spy from within the Black Organization. Rena shoots Akai in the head and places his body in his car with a timed explosive and leaves the scene. Once the bomb detonates, it catches the attention of the authorities and later the media who reports that a body burned beyond recognition was found. The FBI realize that the unidentified body belongs to Akai. Jodie heads to the police station to confirm Akai's death. She gives them Conan's cellphone which contains Akai's fingerprint so they could compare it to the body. The police confirm that a fingerprint found on the phone matched the body and Conan's cellphone is confiscated as evidence. Jodie gives Conan a phone of the same model as a replacement without informing him. Conan, having realized the change in the serial number, realizes Akai had died.
505	15	"Lawyer Eri Kisaki's Testimony (Part 1)"; Transliteration: "Bengoshi Kisaki Eri no Shōgen (Zenpen)" (Japanese: 弁護士妃英理の証言（前編）)	Minoru Tozawa	N/A	June 16, 2008
Eri Kisaki is getting her hair done by her barber, Minayo Hasaka, prior to having dinner with Kogoro, Ran, and Conan that evening. Kogoro, who was on his way to pick up Eri, finds a dead body at a garbage collection point. The police arrive and Conan reveals that the victim, Shirō Nagasaku, was killed while receiving a hair cut as evidenced by the hair particles found mixed in his blood. Kogoro suspects Hasaka to be the murderer, but Eri counters his accusations, stating Hasaka only left her sights for a ten-minute period, during which Hasaka left to throw away the trash at a local convenience store. Eri stats that it would be impossible for Hasaka to carry a body to the bottom of a hill during that time period. During the investigation of Hasaka's salon, Conan notices that the back alley of Hasaka's salon is directly above the garbage collection point and the convenience store is in the opposite direction.
506	16	"Lawyer Eri Kisaki's Testimony (Part 2)"; Transliteration: "Bengoshi Kisaki Eri no Shōgen (Kōhen)" (Japanese: 弁護士妃英理の証言（後編）)	Kouichiro Kuroda	N/A	June 23, 2008
The police confirm that Hasaka was at the convenience store during the ten-minute period. Conan notices that there are strange scratch marks on the pole near the convenience store and the guard rail alley directly above the garbage collection point. Conan realizes how the murder is done, tranquilizes Kogoro, and impersonates him using the voice changing bow tie. Conan reveals that Hasaka tied two strings to a chair with wheels; One short string looped around the guard rail and the longer string to the pole near the convenience store. They were then attached to her scooter and, using the force of her scooter, drives to the convenience store causing the string looped around the guardrail to retract and subsequently pulling the chair with enough speed to launch the body over the railing and into the garbage collection point. The longer string which is looped around the convenience store pole retracts the chair back to the Hasaka's beauty salon. Eri reveals that the trash bags Hasaka threw away would contain the weapon used for the murder. Hasaka confesses to the murder revealing that she hated the hair style Nagasaku adopted and since she promised to cut his hair forever, believed it was her responsibility to murder him so she would not have to cut his hair anymore.
507	17	"The Blind Spot in the Karaoke Box (Part 1)"; Transliteration: "Karaoke Bokkusu no Shikaku (Zenpen)" (Japanese: カラオケボックスの死角（前編）)	Masahiro Hosoda	N/A	June 30, 2008
Eisuke returns to school and Ran and Sonoko take him to karaoke to celebrate his return. Conan notices that there is a strange man following them and presumes he is an FBI agent sent to keep an eye on Eisuke. While there, Eisuke disappears to the bathroom for a suspiciously long time, and returns with a horrified expression. Shortly after the strange man is found dead from repeated beatings to the head with a blunt weapon. Conan suspects Eisuke to be the murderer due to his strange behavior after returning from the bathroom. However, Eisuke explains that the reason he was so horrified was that while he was heading back to their karaoke room, he stumbled into the wrong room and found two men kissing. The other man whom he saw kissing is revealed to be a woman who looks masculine since she is a body builder. The police decide to interrogate the four suspects, including Eisuke, for the murder.
508	18	"The Blind Spot in the Karaoke Box (Part 2)"; Transliteration: "Karaoke Bokkusu no Shikaku (Kōhen)" (Japanese: カラオケボックスの死角（後編）)	Shigeru Yamazaki	N/A	July 7, 2008
The police search the rooms of the four suspects for the blunt weapon used to murder Tatsumi Moniwa. The pictures on Moniwa's cameras were developed revealing pictures of Sonoko. Conan realizes that the man is not an FBI but a stalker who was targeting Sonoko. Upon investigation, Conan realizes who the murderer is; He tranquilizes Sonoko and impersonates her voice to reveal the culprit to be Kyouta Honma. Conan reveals that Honma used a sock stuffed with coins to create a Blackjack. After murdering Moniwa, Honma used the coins to buy cartoons of cigarettes from a vending machine. As evidence, Conan reveals that Honma's shoes have become tighter after the murder due to the fact he is now wearing two pairs of socks. He tells the police the blood sample from the sock or coins in the vending machine will convict Honma of murder. Honma confesses and reveals that Moniwa kidnapped his four-year-old son and murdered him but was released from the authorities due to the lack of evidence and fueled by hatred, committed the murder. While walking home, Eisuke asks Conan to contact Shinichi so he could ask permission to take Ran with him to America. Conan reveals his identity as Shinichi and denies Eisuke's request. Eisuke admits that he knew Conan was Shinichi since the beginning and asks him to take care of Ran while he goes to America to pursue his career in the CIA.
509	19	"Red, White, Yellow, and the Detective Boys"; Transliteration: "Aka, Shiro, Kiiro, to Tanteidan" (Japanese: 赤白黄色と探偵団)	Nobuharu Kamanaka	N/A	July 14, 2008
After school, Conan receives a phone call from Jodie who tells him that the Black Organization has received a new member codenamed Bourbon. Meanwhile, the Detective Boys receive a request from their classmate, Kaito Suigiura, to investigate the actions of a strange man at his apartment building which his father owns. The next day the Detective Boys find that the apartment has been burned down. The police reveal that all the residents have safely left the building; three people, who were not at home during the fire, are suspected to be the arsonist. The police find Kaito's diary and read Kaito's entry on the day of the fire. The diary mentions three residents and clues: In the morning, the "Red man" will be able to sleep in since it is raining; the "White man" was able to help him when he fell; the suspicious "Yellow man" returned home at night and was arguing with Kaito's father. They believe the "Yellow man" is the culprit and interrogate the three suspects: Ryohei Hosoi, a clumsy carpenter who injures himself often; Subaru Okiya, a graduate student who waters the plants of the apartment; and Ginya Makabe, a day trader. The police reveal that Kaito has a collection of model cars and has written Conan's name in his diary as Kuroshiro (黒白, lit. Black and White).
510	20	"Conan vs. Double Code Mystery"; Transliteration: "Conan vs Daburu Angō Misuterī" (Japanese: コナンvs W 暗号ミステリー)	Minoru Tozawa	N/A	July 28, 2008
Conan realizes who the arsonist is and reveals the identities of the "Red man", "White man", and "Yellow man" are related to types of cars: The "Red man" is Subaru Okiya, he is compared to a fire truck since he waters the plants; The "White man" is Ryohei Hosoi, he is compared to an ambulance since he gave Kaito a band-aid after scrapping his knee; The "Yellow man" is Ginya Makabe, he is compared to a construction vehicle since Kaito saw him suspiciously digging in the garden. Ginya confesses to arson and reveals that he was burying the money he earned as a day trader to avoid taxes. When Kaito's father found out, they got into an argument resulting in Ginya pushing Kaito's father down a flight of stairs. Ginya, believing Kaito's father is dead, burns the building down to hide, what he believed to be, the murder. As Ginya is arrested, the Detective Boys ask why Conan was called Kuroshiro; Conan tells them he was compared to a police car. Subaru overhearing the Detective Boys talk about professor Agasa, asks them to introduce him to Agasa so he could become an apprentice and perhaps find a place to stay. Haibara refuses to allow Subaru to stay with the professor believing he is part of the Black Organization. Conan gives Subaru the keys to his house telling him Shinichi would allow it. The next day, Ran and Sonoko head to Shinichi's house to clean it and run into Subaru. After witnessing his deduction skills, Sonoko decides to ask Shinichi and Subaru to solve a case involving paper planes with weird symbols on it found throughout the city in order to find out who would solve it first. Conan texts Ran the answers to his deduction the same moment Subaru explains his theory; They both believe the plane is an SOS.
511	21	"Deduction Showdown! Shinichi vs. Subaru Okiya"; Transliteration: "Suiri Taiketsu! Shinichi vs. Okiya Subaru" (Japanese: 推理対決!新一VS沖矢昴)	Koichiro Kuroda	N/A	August 4, 2008
Subaru reveals that when the paper plane is unfolded, the symbols ··· — — — ··· is Morse code for SOS. The two give Subaru another plane they found with a different design; The plane contains the Morse code of zero with the design of a mobile phone signal on the other side. Subaru deduces that the plane means the victim is in a place with no cell phone reception, meaning he is held captive in a very tall building. The three decide to search for news on the television to find out if more planes were sent. They come upon the news that Ikou Daita, a man of a famous company, was kidnapped three days ago and they realize he is the one sending the paper planes. A paper plane with a different design was shown on the television; Subaru copies down the design and realizes the message tells them Daita is held captive in Beika city. Conan, who has also solved the mystery, tells Ran to search for tall apartment buildings with paper planes on the veranda. After doing so, they report to the authorities who find Daita chained to a ventilator on the brink of death. That following evening, Subaru is shown drinking bourbon whiskey.
512	22	"The Broken Horoscope"; Transliteration: "Kudaketa Horosucōpu" (Japanese: 砕けたホロスコープ)	Masahiro Hosoda	Toyoto Kogiso	August 11, 2008
Kogoro is invited by a famous fortune teller named Reika Shiijou for an interview. Ran asks Shiijou to read her fortune; Shiijou tells her she will read it later and gives Ran her room key's diamond keychain as compensation. Later that evening, Shiijou's guests realize she has been in her room for far too long. Unable to open her door, they see her through the outside window dead. One of her guests, Kensuke Katsuragi, climbs to the top of Shiijou's room and breaks through the glass ceiling and unlocks the door. The police arrive and their investigation reveals that Shiijou's room contained a specialized key which could not be copied. Conans investigates and after finding a few clues, tranquilizes Kogoro and impersonates his voice to reveal Katsuragi to be the culprit. Conan reveals that Katsuragi met with Shiijou in her room and murdered her. After doing so, he took the key to her rooms, locked it, and climbed from the outside to the top of Shiijou's room, cracked a small piece of the ceiling, and dropped the keys into the room. As evidence, Conan reveals that despite the key being mixed in a pile of other keys, Katsuragi was able to find out which key opened the door in his first try. Katsuragi replies that he knew the key with the sapphire keychain was the one for the door; Conan reveals that the key was originally connected to a diamond keychain which is now in Ran's possession. This means that Katsuragi was the last person to meet Shiijou before her death. Katsuragi confesses revealing that Shiijou was extorting money from him. After the police arrest Katsuragi, Conan ask Ran what she wanted Shiijou to read for her to which she replies Shinichi's current whereabouts.
513	23	"Coffee Aroma with Murderous Intention (Part 1)"; Transliteration: "Satsui wa Kōhī no Kaori (Zenpen)" (Japanese: 殺意はコーヒーの香り（前編）)	Yasuichiro Yamamoto	N/A	September 1, 2008
Two TV producers, a man named Shougo Somei and a woman named Maiko Kazumi, ask Kogoro to star on his own show. Kogoro agrees and they plan a meeting for the following day. The next day, Somei picks Kogoro, Ran, and Conan up to meet with his manager, Rasaku Nakama, to discuss the show. When they arrive to Nakama's apartment on the twentieth floor, Somei reveals that Nakama had been talking about killing himself lately, prompting the idea Nakama has committed suicide. They call the apartment manager who opens the door and cuts the door chain allowing them access to the room. They find Nakama who had died poisoned coffee. The police suspect the possibility of murder with the hypothesis that the culprit offered Nakama poisoned coffee before leaving and told Nakama to lock his door with a door chain. Conan investigates the coffee stains and realizes the culprit was with Nakama before he died; This means the culprit somehow placed the door chain back on the door before leaving. The police suspect Somei to be the culprit and that he had tampered the scene to hide how the murder was done.
514	24	"Coffee Aroma with Murderous Intention (Part 2)"; Transliteration: "Satsui wa Kōhī no Kaori (Kōhen)" (Japanese: 殺意はコーヒーの香り（後編）)	Yoshio Suzuki	N/A	September 8, 2008
Conan investigates reveals that Somei tampered with the evidence to suggest Nakama was alone during his time of death. Conan reveals that there were originally two plates, two cups of coffee, and two pieces of cake. Somei took the piece of cake and placed it with the other piece to make it seem as if they were one piece. He then poured coffee from one of the cups into a plant and pretended the cup was a container for pens. For the other plate, he placed it under the spilled coffee cup to act as a saucer. Somei confesses to the murder; Conan at the same time tranquilizes Kogoro to reveal that Somei is innocent. He reveals that a store employee heard Somei talking to Maiko at the time of the murder before calling Kogoro for the meeting; However, the meeting has been cancelled the day before. This suggests that Kogoro was used so Somei would be able to enter Nakama's apartment and tamper with the evidence. Conan reveals the only motive for Somei's actions was to cast suspicion on himself so Maiko's name would not be tarnished with murder. Conan deduces that the phone call from Maiko was so she could confess her love to him before she committed suicide by jumping off the twenty story building. As evidence, Conan reveals that Somei, who was late to the meeting, must have hid Maiko's body in the trunk of his car. Conan reveals that Maiko murdered Nakama because he was harassing and overworking Somei and seeing him tired motivated her to murder.
515	25	"Kaitou Kid's Teleportation Magic^{1 hr.}" Transliteration: "Kaitō Kiddo no Terepōtēshon Majikku" (Japanese: 怪盗キッドの瞬間移動魔術)	Shigeru Yamazaki	N/A	October 20, 2008
Jirokichi Suzuki decides to bait Phantom Thief Kid with the Purple Nails, a pair of high-heeled footwear with embedded jewels worth a fortune, in an attempt to capture him. He places the Purple Nails in the middle of a compact town square to prevent the Phantom Thief Kid from escaping with his hang glider. After announcing his challenge to the media, Kaito Kid arrives from the sky and lands on the pedestal holding the Purple Nails. Jirokichi activates his trap and raises four twenty meter tall nets to prevent Kid from escaping the square. Kid grabs onto the Purple Nails and announces he will escape by the use of teleportation; After he disappears in a cloud of smoke, Kid appears atop the roof of a building ten seconds later. He announces to the journalists that one of the Purple Nails on the pedestal was a fake, and that he will return the next night for the second legitimate heel. The next day, Kid attempts to steal the Purple Nail in the same fashion as before but he is stopped by Conan. Conan reveals Kid's trick; After he disappeared in a cloud of smoke, Kid pulled a black cloak over himself and ran towards the building he planned to hoist himself to the roof. Conan reveals that Kid had set up a pulley before the heist, and by using the weight of sandbags and an accomplice, leveraged himself up to the roof. The Phantom Thief Kid then manages to escape with his accomplice and returns the Purple Nails declaring it was not the gem he was looking for.
516	26	"Fūrinkazan - The Mysterious Armoured Warrior^{1 hr.}" Transliteration: "Fūrinkazan Meikyū no Yoroimusha" (Japanese: 風林火山 迷宮の鎧武者)	Nobuharu Kamanaka	N/A	November 3, 2008
Kogoro is hired by the Torada family to solve the murder of Yoshirō Torada; Yoshirō was swept away by a tornado and was found by an unknown culprit, who instead of helping him, left a dead centipede beside Yoshirō and left him to die. They believe the culprit is from the Tatsuo family, a family whom they share a mutual hatred for. At the same time, Heiji is hired by the Tatsuo family to investigate the death of their son, Kōji Tatsuo, who was found buried under a pile of rocks, bludgeoned to death, and had a dead centipede placed beside his body. During the investigation, Conan, Heiji, run into a third detective named Kansuke Yamato who is investigating the same case. Their investigations lead them to believe the victims and serial killer are somehow related to an incident six years ago, where a respectable officer name Kuroto Kai was found dead during his mounted archery practice. They learn that Kai's body, which sustained injuries from falling off a cliff, died of emaciation which means he was still alive after his fall and that someone left him to die. That night, Ran and Kazuha spot the shadow of a moving Takeda Shingen armor. When Ayaka Tatsuo, hears of this, she becomes hysterical and locks herself in the bathroom. Moments later, Ayaka is found hanged on a tree with a gag around her mouth and a dead centipede under her body. They learn from the Tatsuo family that the centipedes are a reference to Takeda Shingen's soldiers which were referred to as "The Centipedes". The families also revealed that the three victims along with Akira Tatsuo and Shigetsugu Torada were digging around and searching for Takeda Shingen's legendary treasure. Conan and Heiji's investigations lead them to believe the murderer is following the fūrinkazan and that the next culprit shall die in a death related to fire. Elsewhere, Shigetsugu combusts into flames near a railroad track.
517	27	"Fūrinkazan - Shadow and Lightning Conclusion"; Transliteration: "Fūrinkazan Kage to Raikō no Ketchaku" (Japanese: 風林火山 陰と雷光の決着)	Minoru Tozawa	N/A	November 10, 2008
Kansuke Yamato reveals that Shigetsugu hooked his fishing rod onto the railroads power lines resulting in his death. He shows them Shigetsugu's diary which explains that the four victims were the cause of Kuroto Kai's death and deduces that Shigetsugu was the culprit who murdered the three victims before committing suicide. Conan and Heiji investigate Ayaka's crime scene and learn from the forensic team that Ayaka's hand had blue eye liner on it and realize who the true murderer is. In Akira's training room, Akira and Yui Torada confront the real murderer, Tatsue Torada, the current wife of the head of the Torada family. Yui reveals that there were two more lines to the Fūrinkazan, the lines referring to shadow and lightning; She reveals that Shigetsugu's death was lightning, Kai's was shadow, and Akira will be fire in order to complete the Fūrinkazan. She explains that the blue eyeliner on Ayaka's hand was a dying message; The kanji for blue was referring to dark bay, meaning a dark horse and the one riding a dark horse was Tatsue. She explains that Tatsue wants to murder Akira so that she could win a bet involving a lot of money; the bet conditions were that if Akira were to miss a shot during his mounted archery, she would win the bet. Tatsue confesses to all the murders including Kai's death and her plans to murder Akira. Heiji, Conan, and Kansuke who were waiting to ambush Tatsue reveal themselves and apprehend her.
518	28	"Meiji Restoration Mystery Tour (Investigation Chapter)"; Transliteration: "Meiji Ishin Mystery Tour (Tansakuhen)" (Japanese: 明治維新ミステリーツアー（探索編）)	Nobuharu Kamanaka	Yoichi Kato	December 1, 2008
The Detective Boys are at a shrine dedicated to Shōin Yoshida, a famous figure of the Meiji Restoration. While there, they witness two men attempt to wrestle a book from a woman named Kimiko Kobayakawa. After the two men flee, Kobayakawa explains that the two men are after her grandpa's diary which contains the location of a treasure which could buy a country. Kogoro, Ran, and the Detective boys decode the diary to find the location of the treasure. The picture depicts a fox staring at a stream full of carp with the message "Feed the carp to the fox" beside it. Kobayakawa assumes it means the stream of carp she has at her house and takes them to Tsuwano; on the way, they meet up with Kobayakawa's boyfriend, Shigeru Kawaguchi, and her servant Tsuneo Kikkawa. Once arriving to Tsuwano, Conan realizes what the code means and folds the picture to cover the stream resulting in the message "Below the top of the hidden Inari". They search an Inari Shrine and find a map of Hagi with the words "Reflect the castle in the eye of the cat, and look under the mouse". While exploring Hagi, Kobayakawa, Mitsuhiko, and Haibara are kidnapped by the two men from before.
519	29	"Meiji Restoration Mystery Tour (Decipher Chapter)"; Transliteration: "Meiji Ishin Mystery Tour (Kaidokuhen)" (Japanese: 明治維新ミステリーツアー（解読編）)	Nobuharu Kamanaka	Yoichi Kato	December 8, 2008
The kidnappers call Kobayakawa's phone and demands Conan's group to find the treasure before nightfall. Conan realizes that the map of Hagi has the same shape of a cat. He overlaps the picture of a cat from the diary with the map and realizes the location pinpointed by the picture points them to a temple. Once there, Conan realizes that in the previous riddle, "mouse" was referring to the English word mouth. Conan finds the next clue in a stone lantern, and explains that the opening of a lantern is called a fire mouth. The clue contains a ripped page of the diary which tells them they should go to a cave infested with Kappas to construct a map. Kikkawa directs them to Akiyoshi cave, the only cave containing a lake. Once there, Conan realizes the diary page contains panels of a jumbled map and organizes them accordingly to the cave's kanji. Once organized, the map tells them to find the pair of dragons where a fox rock shall point to a rock of light. Conan asks Kikkawa to direct them to place with two waterfalls. Upon arrival, the group discovers a shadow of a fox cast by rock formations and at the tip of the shadow, they find a rock with a mirror inside. The group pushes the rock which reveals a cave underneath and navigates through it with the help of the constructed map. At the end, of the cave, they find a shrine containing a box and are confronted by the kidnappers and their leader, Hisamichi Takahashi. Hisamichi opens the box to find a letter written by an ancestor of the Kobayakawa family which contains one of Shōin Yoshida's lessons about willpower and its power to change a country. Hisamichi later decides to turn himself in to the authorities. Later that day, Conan reveals to Haibara that the letter contained a rare stamp worth millions of yen.
520	30	"Red Wine Indictment"; Transliteration: "Wain Reddo no Kokuhatsu" (Japanese: ワインレッドの告発)	Masahiro Hosoda Tomoya Tanaka (Note: Assistant director)	Hiro Masaki	December 15, 2008
Kogoro is invited as a guest to a wine appreciation party hosted by a wine collector named Murozou Honjou. While exploring the villa, Conan and Ran notice Honjou in an argument with a wine critic named Gorou Akamaru. From afar, Conan witnesses Honjou smashing a brick into Akamaru's skull. Conan runs to their location but is unable to find evidence of the assault. While Conan investigates, he notices blood in a barrel and realizes Akamaru's body was stored there but moved to a different location so he would not be found. Conan realizes the only room he had not investigated is the wine storage room which is secured by a system requiring Honjou's fingerprint. During a wine tasting ceremony, Honjou's prized wine has been found to have been shaken and subsequently caused the dregs to mix with the wine and ruining the taste. Conan examines the bottle and finds a bloody fingerprint; This leads him to conclude that Akamaru regained consciousness while imprisoned in the wine cellar and ruined Honjou's wine in an act of revenge. Using Kogoro, Conan tells the guests that an unknown culprit entered Honjou's wine cellar and ruined the wine purposely; The guests force Honjou to search his wine cellar and there they find Akamaru. Akamaru who is still alive regains consciousness in the hospital and Honjou is arrested.
521	31	"Murderer, Shinichi Kudo^{1 hr.}" Transliteration: "Satsujinhan, Kudō Shinichi" (Japanese: 殺人犯、工藤新一)	Minoru Tozawa	N/A	January 19, 2009
Heiji takes Kazuha, Kogoro, Ran, and Conan to East Okuho after receiving a letter from Makato Okuda addressed to Shinichi; The letter tells Shinichi to meet with him so he could explain Shinichi's deduction mistake from his past investigation. Upon arrival, the group learns that Makato has been missing for over a year; Conan separates from the group and heads to the meeting location disclosed in the letter and is subsequently trapped inside a shed by an unknown culprit. Conan realizes that he mistakenly took the antidote to the APTX 4869 in place of his cold medicine; He escapes through a window and falls into the river before becoming Shinichi again. Heiji and the others find an amnesic Shinichi by a shore; the villagers believe that the Shiragami, a deity living in the forest, cursed Shinichi resulting in his amnesia. Haibara tells Heiji that the antidote would wear off in 24 hours and if Shinichi still retains amnesia even after reverting to Conan, his identity would be exposed. Heiji learns that Shinichi was called to investigate the murder of the mayor and his wife which was concluded to be a forced double suicide. A journalist named Misato Kawuchi threatens to reveal Shinichi's secret if he does not confess to faking his amnesia. The following day, Kawuchi is found with a knife wound with Shinichi beside her holding a knife. The group believing Shinichi is being framed, hides him from the authorities until they can prove his innocence. Heiji attempts to deduce how the culprit was able to frame Shinichi for the stabbing and believes it is related to the past case Shinichi solved. Meanwhile, Ran runs into the forest hoping to confront the Shiragami to remove his curse on Shinichi but loses consciousness after falling off a cliff.
522	32	"Shinichi's True Face and Ran's Tears^{1 hr.}" Transliteration: "Shinichi no Shōtai ni Ran no Namida" (Japanese: 新一の正体に蘭の涙)	Shigeru Yamazaki	N/A	January 26, 2009
Heiji and the others find Ran unconscious in a shed and realize the Shiragami carried her there to address her wounds. Heiji's investigates and realizes how the culprit is framing Shinichi. Heiji reveals that Shinichi is the one who stabbed Kawuchi and no trick was involved. The Shiragami appears and reveals himself to be the real Shinichi and that the amnesic Shinichi is actually Makoto who underwent plastic surgery to look like him. As evidence, Heiji reveals that there were many broken hand mirrors in the shed; Heiji explains that Makoto hated Shinichi and seeing Shinichi's face in his reflection caused him to break the mirror in anger. Makoto confesses and declares that the mayor's death was not a forced double suicide but a robbery which ended in murder since the mayor had no motive to murder his wife and himself. Heiji reveals that the mayor found out he had type AB blood yet his wife and son had type O; This means his wife had an affair and that he did not father his son and thus murdered his wife in a fit of rage. While driving back home, the group notices a car driving out of control. They stop the car and notice that the driver has been strangled to death.
523	33	"What She Truly Wants to Ask"; Transliteration: "Hontō ni Kikitai Koto" (Japanese: 本当に聞きたいコト)	Koichiro Kuroda	N/A	February 2, 2009
The police are able to stop traffic by ordering a toll gate to refuse cars passage. Shinichi and Heiji reveal that the victim died while driving evidenced by his body temperature. They are able to narrow the list of suspects to three people by examining the time on their toll tickets and matching it with the victims. The three suspects reveal that the victim was a famous street racer who went under the name Gunpei who quit racing when he caused the death of a man named Akira during a race. The three each have a motive for the murder. Shinichi and Heiji notice that there are holes in the car window by the side of the driver's seat and realize how the murder is done. They both reveal that the culprit is Riko Mizuhashi, Akira's girlfriend. They explain that Riko gave Gunpei sleeping pills forcing Gunpei to pull over and sleep in a rest stop. While asleep, Mizuhashi drilled holes into Gunpei's window and set up a fishing line through the holes and looped it around Gunpei's neck. After Gunpei wakes up and begins to drive, Mizuhashi drove up beside him and signaled to him that she has something to tell him. Gunpei lowers his window which causes the fishing line to tighten around his neck and causes his death. After solving the murder, the antidote to the APTX 4869 begins to wear off and Shinichi begins to change back to Conan; He attempts to seclude himself for the transformation but Ran grabs onto his hand and refuses to let go.

== Volume DVDs ==
Shogakukan released ten DVD compilations of the seventeenth season between September 26, 2008, and August 28, 2009, in Japan.

Shogakukan/Being (Japan, Region 2 DVD)
Volume	Episodes^{Jp.}	Release date	Ref.
Volume 1	486, 491–493	September 26, 2008	
Volume 2	494–497	October 24, 2008	
Volume 3	498–501	January 1, 2009	
Volume 4	502–504, 512	February 27, 2009	
Volume 5	505–508	March 27, 2009	
Volume 6	509–511, 520	April 24, 2009	
Volume 7	513–515	May 22, 2009	
Volume 8	516–517, 526	June 26, 2009	
Volume 9	518–519, 521	July 24, 2009	
Volume 10	522–523, 527	August 28, 2009	

== Notes and references ==
Notes

- ^Jp. The episode's numbering as followed in Japan
- ^1 hr. The episodes were aired as a single hour-long episode in Japan
