= Crime scene getaway =

Act of fleeing the location where one has broken the law

A crime scene getaway is the act of departing from the location where one has committed a crime. It is an act that the offender(s) may or may not have planned in detail, resulting in a variety of outcomes. A crime scene is the "location of a crime; especially one at which forensic evidence is collected in a controlled manner." The "getaway" is any escape by a perpetrator from that scene, which may have been witnessed by eyewitnesses or law enforcement.

The crime scene getaway is the subject of several penal laws. If motor vehicles are used for the getaway, then each vehicle is a new crime scene.

== As an inchoate offense ==
In some jurisdictions, the very act of making a getaway from a crime scene is an inchoate criminal offense in itself, though it is generally viewed as natural behavior for a lawbreaker. For example, under New York law, "escape" is defined as escaping custody or detention; "unlawful fleeing a police in a motor vehicle" is a distinct crime.

== Methods of crime scene getaways ==
=== Running ===
For thousands of years in the past, the standard method of escape from a crime scene was for the perpetrator merely to run away, faster than the constable on patrol, sheriff, or the night watchman. This was common even into the 20th century. For example, according to the Warren Commission report, Lee Harvey Oswald infamously walked, then ran away from the Texas School Book Depository from where he shot President Kennedy on November 22, 1963. If another means of transportation becomes unavailable, the suspect may have to run.

=== Horseback ===
Once humans domesticated horses, that animal became a favorite way to escape a crime scene. Many old "Wild West" bank robbers, train robbers and other outlaws such as Butch Cassidy, Tom Horn, Jesse James, John Wesley Hardin, Apache Kid, Bill Doolin, Tiburcio Vasquez, Cherokee Bill, Sam Bass, Billy the Kid, Rufus Buck, Belle Starr, Henry Plummer, Soapy Smith, William Brocius, Queen Ann Bassett, Jim Miller, John Wilkes Booth and Bob Dozier of the 19th century used horses to get away from the scene of their larceny and murders.

The etymology of two common terms for peace officers in premodern times indicates that their major role may have been to prevent horse theft—or escape by horse. These are constable (from the Latin comes stabuli -- attendant to the stables), and marshall, a loanword from Old Norman French, which in turn is borrowed from Old Frankish *marhskalk "stable boy, keeper, servant", cognate with Germanic *marha- "horse" (cf. Engl. mare) and skalk- "servant" (cf. Old Engl. scealc "servant, soldier").

While not as common in modern times, horses have still been used by criminals to flee from a crime scene and/or escape from police, oftentimes in developing countries where motor vehicles might not be as common and/or in cases when the suspects are trying to uses horses to flee in rural areas and/or wilderness areas where cars would be either too impractical or noisy. Examples of criminals using getaway horses in modern times, include organized criminals fleeing from the scene of narcotics operations, safe houses or smuggling routs when they have been discovered by police. During the Columbian search block manhunt, Pablo Escobar and his cartel associates utilized multiple methods to evade the authorities, even at times using escape-horses.

=== Vehicle ===
A motor vehicle, commonly referred to as a getaway car, is frequently used by the offender to flee the scene of a crime. Getaway cars are prevalent in major crimes such as bank robberies and homicides. Very frequently, but not always, a getaway car is stolen and is abandoned soon after the crime, in the hope that the vehicle cannot be traced to the offender.

If the vehicle does not belong to the driver and is quickly abandoned, a trace may not be possible without examination of forensic evidence. In some cases, the offender may go to extreme measures to discard the getaway vehicle in order to hinder investigations by dumping it in a river, lake or a deeply secluded forest, and/or setting it on fire or even bringing the vehicle to a scrapyard or a chop shop; while this may not make solving the crime impossible, it can make the effort more difficult for law enforcement. The criminal investigation can be further complicated by the use of multiple getaway vehicles, which can confuse eyewitnesses, as well as creating multiple places to investigate: each vehicle is a new crime scene. In Forensics for Dummies, the rookie is reminded: "At a minimum, the crime scene includes ... Areas from which the site can be entered, exited, or even escaped...."

Since a getaway vehicle often requires a getaway driver, this additional co-defendant creates problems in itself. First, having a second perpetrator involved creates yet another inchoate offence that the prosecutor can use in an indictment: conspiracy. Also, a co-conspirator may cooperate with police, either intentionally by 'turning state's evidence' by way of a plea bargain, or inadvertently by giving away information to persons outside the conspiracy. If the driver, who may have parked some distance away, unknowingly drives past the scene of the crime, the getaway vehicle itself may identify the occupants to the crime victim and police. This is especially true if the vehicle has unique markings or is an unusual model. Without a driver, the perpetrator may make errors due to the stress associated with the crime, or lack of ability to multi-task (such as leaving the car keys at the scene of the crime); a murderer needs to "think strategically" to get away with murder—to "mislead police, stage crime scenes and destroy evidence."

Taking a public bus or taxicab makes the driver an involuntary co-conspirator, yet also creates an eyewitness whose interest it is to cooperate with police.

Witnesses to the crime will often attempt to take note of the tags (registration plate) or other important details of the car and report this information to law enforcement. It may be possible to identify the offender if an officer spots the offender in possession of the vehicle prior to its abandonment. In one news story:

The homeowner was at the back of the house at the time of the incident, and was able to identify the getaway vehicle. When police arrived at the scene, they began to drive around the neighborhoods, until they found [the accused] and the vehicle, driving around some four blocks away.

— Mauricio J. Cuellar Jr., reporter, Alice Echo News,

Crime victims can also hinder escape by disabling or moving the getaway vehicle. If a witness follows the offender to the point of abandonment, and observes the offender's tracks from beyond this point, that may help the police. However, such civilian involvement may be dangerous, and is generally not recommended by police departments. In other cases, the public may be hesitant to cooperate, with or without the offer of a reward:

Witnesses are often reluctant to come forward. Many people who could help with an investigation often don't. They sometimes don't help because they don't realize what they know is valuable. Other times they don't help because they fear what might happen if they do. Or they might simply be loyal to the perpetrator.

— Mary Ellen O'Toole, in Psychology Today,

The earliest robbers known to have made such use of an automobile were the anarchist-inspired Bonnot Gang, active in Paris of the early 1910s. Later, the method was used by John Dillinger and Bonnie and Clyde, whose exploits got wide media attention and inspired many less-known robbers.

== Rebuttal of the insanity defense ==
Under the M'Naghten rules for the insanity defense, the defendant must be not only mentally ill ("suffering from a mental disease or defect" is a typical formulation) but also unable to tell right from wrong. If the defendant runs away from the crime scene, there must thus be an awareness that the crime is wrong and so a jury would, under such factual circumstances, deny that defense.

Clark v. Arizona ruled that the defense is not a right and that its scope is limited by whether the defendant knew right from wrong.

== See also ==
- Consciousness of guilt
- Crime preparation
- Disposal of human corpses
- Fugitive
- Resisting arrest
- Skiptrace
- Tampering with evidence
