= List of Case Closed volumes (41–60) =

Cover of Case Closed volume 41

The Case Closed manga, known in Japan as Detective Conan (名探偵コナン, Meitantei Conan), is written by Gosho Aoyama and serialized in Shogakukan's shōnen manga magazine Weekly Shōnen Sunday since January 19, 1994. Since Case Closed's premiere, over 1,000 chapters have been released in Japan, making it the 25th longest running manga series. Several adaptations based on Case Closed have been made, including an anime series and animated films. A database consisting of all the cases from the manga was launched in 2007. Viz Media announced its licensing of the series on June 1, 2004, and following Funimation Entertainment's English localization, released the series under the name Case Closed with renamed characters. The series follows high school detective Jimmy Kudo who was transformed into a child after being forced to swallow a poison.

The tankōbon volumes 41–60 contain chapters 414–630. Shogakukan released the twenty volumes between April 9, 2003, and January 12, 2008.

== Volumes ==
No.	Title	Original release date	English release date
41	Ladies' Night	April 9, 2003; 978-4-09-126411-4	January 10, 2012; 978-1-4215-3607-1
414. "Dueling Mothers?!" (ママはライバル!?, Mama wa Raibaru!?); 415. "The Suspicious Gunshots" (疑惑の銃声, Giwaku no Jūsei); 416. "The Night Baroness!" (闇の男爵夫人登場!, Naito Baronisu Tōjō!); 417. "Darkness Is a Door to Death" (暗闇は死の罠の扉, Kurayami wa Desu Torappu no Tobira); 418. "A Silent Murder in the Dark" (暗闇の音無き殺人, Kurayami no Otonaki Satsujin); 419. "The Mystery of the Black Light" (黒い光の謎, Kuroi Hikari no Nazo); 420. "The Net Closes" (迫る包囲網, Semaru Hōimō); 421. "Present Danger" (そこにある危機, Soko ni Aru Kiki); 422. "No Escape" (逃れられないターゲット, Nogarerarenai Tāgetto); 423. "A Mystery Left by a Visitor" (ある来訪者の残した謎..., Aru Raihōsha no Nokoshita Nazo...); 424. "A Mystery Left in a Locked Room" (小さな密室に残された秘密, Chiisana Misshitsu ni Nokosareta Himitsu)
Jimmy's mother Vivian Kudo and Rachel's mother Eva Kaden solve the case involving the husband who was shot in a locked room that was shown in home surveillance footage. Later, Vivan takes the Junior Detectives for an advance screening, but they first meet members of the film crew. However, when they stay the night at a crew member's nearby apartment, one of the crew members is murdered, and the apartment tenant becomes the primary suspect. During the case, Conan and Anita realize they are being followed. When Anita becomes ill, Agasa and the Junior Detectives take her to a hospital clinic at a shopping center, but in a parking lot, a group of Porsche owners become suspects to a murder of one of their members. Later, Conan and Anita visit Anita's father's childhood home, looking for possible clues to Anita's sister. Once there, a man who has been renting the place and is a childhood friend of Anita's father, is poisoned by cyanide.
42	The Woman in Black	July 18, 2003; 978-4-09-126412-1	April 10, 2012; 978-1-4215-3608-8
425. "The Hidden Truth" (隠されていた真実, Kakusareteita Shinjitsu); 426. "Goodbye, Jodie" (good-byeジョディ, Gubbai Jodi); 427. "Rachel's Deduction" (蘭の推理, Ran no Suiri"; lit. Ran's Deduction); 428. "An Unbelievable Conclusion" (信じられない結末, Shinjirarenai Ketsumatsu); 429. "The Night of the Full Moon and the Deadly Banquet" (満月の夜と黒い宴の罠, Mangetsu no Yoru to Kuroi Utage no Wana); 430. "The Bloody Ghost Ship" (血塗られた幽霊船, Chinurareta Yūreisen); 431. "The Invisible Man Cometh" (透明人間現る!, Tōmei Ningen Arawaru!); 432. "Jimmy Kudo on the Scene?" (工藤新一登場!?, Kudō Shinichi Tojō!?"; lit. Shinichi Kudo on the Scene?); 433. "The Truth Beneath the Mask" (仮面の下の真実, Kamen no Shita no Shinjitsu); 434. "Rotten Apple" (ラットゥンアップル, Rattun Appuru); 435. "The Mark in the Rain" (雨中の刻印, Uchū no Kokuin)
Conan uses Agasa to solve the case of the poisoned designer at Anita's father's childhood home. Jodie quits her teaching job. Ran and Rachel go to a convenience store to get supplies for her going-away party, but find out their classmate who works there is being fired for suspicion of stealing. Jodie suggests Rachel try to solve the case herself, and Jimmy encourages her to go with her hunches. Vermouth invites Richard to a Halloween party. An invite is also addressed to Jimmy Kudo but opens with "Dear Conan Edogawa". During the party, the host, explains that the event is mystery-themed, but then he is murdered. Meanwhile, Anita is invited for a check up by Dr. Araide, but Jodie picks her up instead. The invisible man reveals himself as Jimmy Kudo and solves the murder as well as the mystery. At the same time, Jodie reveals Dr. Araide to be Vermouth in disguise, however Vermouth turns the tide on Jodie by having her partner shoot her. As the Jimmy at the party is actually Harley, Conan saves Jodie and confronts Vermouth, but Vermouth escapes. Later, Amy bumps into a guy in a raincoat reputed to be a slasher with a knife, but the guy escapes. Amy has a weird "S"-shape mark, the Junior Detectives and Sato chase down the possible killer.
43	The Game's Afoot	October 18, 2003; 978-4-09-126413-8	July 10, 2012; 978-1-4215-3609-5
436. "Get to the Bottom of It!" (おしりの印を探せ!, Oshiri no Māku o Sagase!); 437. "The Resolution of Anita Hailey" (灰原哀の決意, Haibara Ai no Ketsui"; lit. The Resolution of Ai Haibara); 438. "The Forgotten Cell Phone" (忘れられた携帯電話, Wasurerareta Keitai Denwa); 439. "A Very Strange Address Book" (奇妙なメモリー, Kimyō na Memorī); 440. "The Other Detective" (もうひとつの名探偵, Mō Hitotsu no Meitantei); 441. "Top Sleuth" (どっちの推理ショー!?, Dotchi no Suiri Shō!?); 442. "The Message with Six Faces" (六面体のメッセージ, Rokumentai no Messēji); 443. "Read Between the Lines!" (ダイイングメッセージの裏を読め!, Daiingu Messēji no Ura o Yome!); 444. "The Made-Up Message" (仕組まれたメッセージ, Shikumareta Messēji); 445. "One Demon Among 53,000" (53,000分の1の悪魔, Goman-hassen-bun no Ichi no Akuma); 446. "The Koshien Demon's Challenge" (甲子園の魔物の挑発, Kōshien no Mamono no Chōhatsu)
Conan and the Junior Detectives solve the case involving the slasher and the S-shaped mark. A waitress finds a cellphone at a restaurant that Richard and Conan frequent, but the man who supposedly lost it is soon found dead. Conan determines the cellphone was left on purpose, and that the callers to the cellphone are suspects. Harley and Kazuha invite Conan, Rachel and Richard to Osaka, but there is a scheduling conflict between attending a Kōshien (high school) baseball game or a theatre performance. They decide to settle it by whoever can solve the next case. Conan teams with Harley, and Rachel and Richard team with Kazuha as they investigate the murder of a toy company executive who had left a mysterious message involving toy blocks and ink. Harley ponders letting the girls figure it out but ends up tying up the loose ends. At the baseball game, a bomber texts Harley and Conan with clues to look for a series of cellphones he has placed around the stadium. If they do not find and answer the cellphones after the end of every three innings, he will set off an explosion in the stadium.
44	How To Steal A Wonder	January 17, 2004; 978-4-09-126414-5	October 9, 2012; 978-1-4215-3610-1
447. "The Mystery of the Three Numbers" (3つの数字の謎を解け!, Mittsu no Sūji no Nazo o Toke!); 448. "Clueless" (ヒントが無い!?, Hinto ga Nai!?); 449. "Game Over?" (試合終了...!?, Gēmu Setto!?); 450. "From Heaven to Hell" (天国から地獄, Tengoku kara Jigoku); 451. "No Problem" (全然平気!?, Zenzen Heiki!?); 452. "No Doubt?" (疑わないの?, Utaganai no!?); 453. "Miracle" (奇蹟, Kiseki); 454. "Thunderstruck" (驚愕, Kyōgaku); 455. "Amazement" (戦慄, Senritsu); 456. "The Getaway" (脱出, Dasshutsu); 457. "A Scary School Story" (学校奇譚, Gakkō Kitan)
Conan and Harley continue to hunt for cellphones around the stadium, and eventually find the bomber when the game goes into extra innings. Later, Yumi overhears that Takagi is being reassigned to a remote police station in Tottori, causing him and Sato to worry about their relationship. Before then, he must solve a murder where the primary suspect is a friend of their police detective colleague Kazunobu Chiba who is off-duty. Conan and the Junior Detectives try to help him out by cracking the friend's alibi. Later, Serena's uncle Jirokichi announces plans to bait the Kaito Kid with a jewel called the Blue Wonder. The night before, Kaito Kid uses a trick where he is suspended in mid-air and walks forward to examine the area, surprising everyone. The next night, he does the same, and almost gets away with stealing the gem until Conan figures out how he did it. At Teitan High, weird things are happening and the suspect is a ghost. Conan volunteers to investigate it for Rachel, and Dr. Araide returns to join them.
45	Dead Calm	April 5, 2004; 978-4-09-126415-2	January 8, 2013; 978-1-4215-3611-8
458. "Where are the Footprints?" (足跡はどこに!?, Ashiato wa Doko ni!?); 459. "The Truth Behind the Desk" (残された机の真実, Nokosareta Tsukue no Shinjitsu); 460. "A Locked Room Murder on the Open Sea" (海の上の開かれた密室, Umi no Ue no Hirakareta Misshitsu); 461. "The Poisoned Bait" (釣りエサは毒!?, Tsuri Esa wa Doku!?); 462. "Glad to Burn" (嬉しい火傷, Ureshii Yakedo); 463. "Hideyoshi's Return" (秀吉の大返し, Hideyoshi no Ōgaeshi); 464. "A Suspicious Feeling" (違和感..., Iwakan...); 465. "The Back Street in the Sky" (大空の裏道, Ōzora no Uramichi); 466. "A Message from a Star" (星より密かに, Hoshi yori Hisoka ni); 467. "Have You Seen the Stars?" (星を見たかい, Hoshi o Mita kai); 468. "Wish upon a Star" (星に願いを, Hoshi ni Negai o)
Conan solves the case of the school ghost and the desk that was moved in the rain without getting wet. Agasa and the Junior Detectives go fishing at an offshore dock. When the boat returns to pick them up, one of the fishermen has been poisoned. Richard is invited to interview with a baseball closer in Okinawa, but as they ride with the interviewer to the hotel they find the player dead on the side of the road. Conan suspects the interviewer as the culprit, and must crack his alibi, but he gets a chilling feeling like he did with Vermouth. Later, Agasa and the Junior Detectives head to a remote resort where they can observe the stars. They meet some astronomers, but discover the bones of a murder victim and a set of cigarettes of different lengths.
46	Arson, with Occasional Music	July 16, 2004; 978-4-09-126416-9	April 9, 2013; 978-1-4215-3612-5
469. "The Star Knows All" (星は何でも知っている, Hoshi wa Nandemo Shitteiru); 470. "Prelude" (前奏曲, Pureryūdo); 471. "Capriccio" (狂奏曲, Kapuritcho); 472. "Requiem" (鎮魂曲, Rekuiemu); 473. "Impromptu" (即興曲, Anpuromputyu); 474. "Fantasia" (幻想曲, Fantajia); 475. "The Seal" (封印, Fūin); 476. "Karakuri" (絡繰, Karakuri); 477. "Sacred Treasures" (神器, Jingi); 478. "Eternal" (不滅, Fumetsu); 479. "A Suspicious Message" (疑惑のメール, Giwaku no Mēru)
Conan solves the case of the dead astronomer. Richard is invited to solve a case involving a cursed Stradivarius, where anyone who has played the violin on the client's grandfather's birthday has died. When the estate's annex burns down, killing one, and another family member dies from falling out of a window, Conan suspects a serial murderer. Conan discovers the tones that Vermouth texted on the phone could give a clue to the source of the Black Organization. On the Junior Detective League's camping trip, they come across an old house and a body buried under water in a pond nearby. They discover some clues leading to a diamond treasure but the house is full of booby-traps, and has also attracted other treasure hunters, including the Kaito Kid. When Rachel discovers that her text messages to Jimmy are being received on Conan's cell phone, she suspects Conan is covering up for Jimmy. Richard is hired to help a young woman to find her cell phone before someone else in her family finds it and suspects an affair. But after he finds it, the woman later appears on the news having been murdered.
47	Rachel Rings Twice	October 18, 2004; 978-4-09-126417-6	July 9, 2013; 978-1-4215-3613-2
480. "A Suspicious Deduction" (疑惑の推理, Giwaku no Suiri); 481. "A Suspicious Alibi" (疑惑のアリバイ, Giwaku no Aribai); 482. "The Suspicious Truth" (疑惑の真相, Giwaku no Shinsō); 483. "Unlocking" (ロックをはずして..., Rokku o Hazushite...); 484. "From Him to Her" (彼氏から彼女へ, Kareshi kara Kanojo e); 485. "From Suicide to Homicide" (自殺から他殺へ, Jisatsu kara Tasatsu e); 486. "From Heaven to Earth" (天空から地上へ, Tenkū kara Chijō e); 487. "The Appearing Act" (出現マジック, Shūgen Magikku); 488. "The Forbidden Notes" (禁じられたファイル, Kinjirareta Fairu); 489. "The Magician's Castle" (奇術師の館, Majishan no Yakata); 490. "The Failed Magician" (奇術師失格, Majishan Shikkaku)
In the case of the woman who was killed after misplacing and then retrieving her cellphone, Rachel eyes Conan's behavior and suspects he might actually be Jimmy Kudo. Conan must give hints to Richard and Inspector Meguire so they can solve it. Afterwards, Rachel gets hold of Conan's cellphone, but thanks to a last-minute switch with Agasa, Jimmy is able to keep his identity a secret. Takagi and the Junior Detectives chase a jewelry store robber to a rooftop, but when the robber jumps to his death, Conan suspects it is not a suicide. After Conan, Rachel, Harley and Kazuha attend a magic show, they are invited by the magician to a house along with two other magicians who had apprenticed there. When one of the magicians is killed, Conan and Harley try to solve the case, but Harley seems bothered by Kazuha's interacting with one of the guy magicians.
48	Death Comes As the Beginning	January 14, 2005; 978-4-09-126418-3	October 8, 2013; 978-1-4215-3614-9
491. "Summertime Secret Code" (夏休みの暗号, Natsuyasumi no Angō); 492. "It's a Wash" (寝転んで顔を洗え!, Nekoronde Kao o Arae!); 493. "The Perfect Solution" (パーフェクト解読!!, Pāfekuto Kaidoku!!); 494. "The House of the Evil Spirit" (悪霊の棲む屋敷, Akuryō no Sumu Yashiki); 495. "The Nightmare from 13 Years Ago" (13年前の悪夢, Jū-san-nen Mae no Akumu); 496. "The Return of the Evil Spirit" (蘇る悪霊, Yomigaeru Akuryō); 497. "Something Overlooked" (見過していたもの, Misugoshiteitamono); 498. "A Shock After 13 Years" (13年目の衝撃, Jū-san-nen-me no Shōgeki); 499. "Ding-Dong Dash" (ピンポンダッシュ, Pin Pon Dasshu); 500. "A New Woman in Black" (新たなる黒の者, Aratanaru Kuro no Mono)
While camping, Dr. Agasa and Anita give the Junior Detectives a riddle to solve, while Conan receives a cell phone picture of Rachel in a swimsuit, and then a call from Rachel and Serena about their getting involved as witnesses to a crime scene involving a murder. Conan is unable to solve either until he learns more of the girls' situation. Later, Richard is invited by a man to get rid of an evil spirit who has been harassing him on the fourth day of certain months. At the man's estate, the guy's friend who had installed a security system is soon found hanging dead off a balcony, but the family and staff seem to have alibis of being away from the scene as well as having peculiar phobias that would likely excuse them from the crime. Then the man is mysteriously murdered. Local anchorwoman Rena Mizunashi hires Richard to investigate who has been ringing her door bell and running away. Conan plants a listening bug in Rena's apartment, but after they solve the case, Conan is shocked to learn that Rena has been in contact with Gin, and that she is part of the Black Organization.
49	The Day of the Jekyll	April 6, 2005; 978-4-09-126419-0	January 14, 2014; 978-1-4215-5506-5
501. "Pursue the Target!" (ターゲットを追え!, Tāgetto o Oe!); 502. "A New Mission" (新たなる指令, Aratanaru Shirei); 503. "Men in Black vs. FBI (1)" (黒の組織VS.FBI①, Kuro no Soshiki Bāsasu Efu Bī Ai Ichi); 504. "Men in Black vs. FBI (2)" (黒の組織VS.FBI②, Kuro no Soshiki Bāsasu Efu Bī Ai Ni); 505. "The New Teacher" (新しい先生, Atarashii sensei); 506. "The Secret Route (1)" (秘密の通学路①, Himitsu no Tsūgakuro Ichi); 507. "The Secret Route (2)" (秘密の通学路②, Himitsu no Tsūgakuro Ni); 508. "Can't Go Back" (戻れない二人, Modorenai Futari); 509. "The Sealed Car" (密閉された車, Mippeisarete Kuruma); 510. "Untrue Love" (偽りの愛情, Itsuwari no Aijō); This volume also contains a character guide special in celebration of the 500th chapter.
The Black Organization plan to kill a politician nicknamed DJ, but Conan figures out which one is in danger and then, along with Jodie, thwarts the assassination attempt. When Gin finds Conan's listening device on Kir's shoe, he changes the assassination target to Richard Moore. A fourth-grader who resembles Anita goes missing, and the Junior Detectives set out to find her. They suspect the substitute teacher may be involved as he follows the kids and has a suspicious look. Rachel's new classmate, the very clumsy Eisuke Hondo, wants to see the Richard in action, hoping that his luck will rub on him. Rachel and Conan join Richard on a case where a guy is looking for his girlfriend in the snow, but they find her dead in a car sealed by duct tape, having been poisoned by carbon monoxide coming from a small fire pot. Conan suspects the guy is the killer.
50	Murder On the Slopes	July 15, 2005; 978-4-09-126420-6	April 8, 2014; 978-1-4215-5507-2
511. "The Menacing Mixer" (緊迫のコンパ, Kinpaku no Kompa); 512. "The Secret Visit" (秘密の家庭訪問, Himitsu no Kateihōmon); 513. "A Boring Game" (つまんない試合, Tsuman'nai Shiai); 514. "Jackpot!" (大当たり!, Ōatari!); 515. "A Thrilling Interview" (ワクワク取材, Waku-waku Shuzai); 516. "A Message from a Murderer" (真犯人の伝言, Shin Han'nin no Dengon); 517. "The Detective Boys" (ザ・少年探偵団, Za Shōnen Tantei-dan); 518. "Harley's Memory" (平次の思い出, Heiji no Omoide"; lit. Heiji's Memory); 519. "Scheme of the Snow Spirit" (雪女の計, Yuki Onna no Kei); 520. "The Mysterious Lift" (謎のリフト, Nazo no Rifuto); 521. "The Legend of the Snow Spirit" (雪女の銀衣伝説, Yuki Onna no Gingoromo Densetsu)
Richard, Rachel and Conan are eating at a cafe when they meet Takagi and Chiba who have been invited to a singles mixer, which turns out to involve their policewomen colleagues Miyamoto and Sato. They learn that the mixer host and his sister have been taking care of their cousin who was left alone, but the boy is kidnapped, and some of the invited guys that did not attend the mixer are suspect. The Junior Detectives are invited to interview with a magazine publisher, but when they arrive, they find he has been murdered. Anita warns Conan not to solve the case so quickly since their teacher Ms. Kobayashi is watching them. Harley remembers a case three years ago when he was in middle school and he and Kazuha were at a ski resort. A film crew and some actors were going to produce a story involving a snow spirit maiden, but the actor is murdered on the chairlift. Harley learns that another middle school detective (Jimmy Kudo) is also on the case, and the two compete to see who can solve it first.
51	The Cat Who Read Japanese	October 18, 2005; 978-4-09-127361-1	July 8, 2014; 978-1-4215-6507-1
522. "Revenge in the Blizzard" (吹雪の中の復讐, Fujiki no Naka no Fukushū); 523. "A Fishy Incident" (おさかな事件, Osakana Jiken); 524. "The Three Fishes" (3匹の魚, Sanbiki no Sakana); 525. "Crestfallen Clamdigging" (ため息潮干狩り, Tameiki Shiohigari); 526. "The Mystery of the Plastic Bottle" (ペットボトルの怪, Petto Botoru no Kai); 527. "The Mixture Trick" (混入トリック, Kon'nyū Torikku); 528. "Russian Blue" (ロシアンブルー, Roshian Burū); 529. "Ricky Is Ricky" (ゴロはゴロでも!?, Goro wa Goro demo!?"; lit. Goro Is Goro!?); 530. "The Closed Window" (開かずの窓, Akazu no Mado); 531. "The Locked Room Setup" (作られた密室, Tsukurareta Misshitsu); 532. "The Demon's Loophole" (魔物の抜け穴, Mamono no Nukeana)
Jimmy and Harley solve the case of the actor murdered at the chairlift, although they aren't completely satisfied since they got help from their parents. At the nearby Cafe Poirot restaurant, the waitress has been receiving text messages from a five-year-old boy who frequents the place. The boy's latest four messages prompt that he is in danger, so Conan tries to figure out where he could be. The Junior Detectives are clam digging at the beach when they find a guy who had also been digging dead in a car from an apparent suicide from drinking bottled tea and poison. The man's friends become suspects. Rachel takes care of her mother's Russian Blue cat. While Richard is puzzling over a recent case involving a teenage girl's text message, the cat wanders around the place and seems to give Richard hints as to how to solve it. Rachel, Serena, Eisuke and Conan head to an old mansion where they had solved a case involving a bandaged man (from volume 6), but the rope bridge is out so they go to an old villa nearby that had been reputed to house some gruesome suicides involving some sort of demon. The current residents are part of a band hoping to get inspired to write songs, but one of its members is soon found hanged.
52	The Woman in White	January 14, 2006; 978-4-09-120026-6	October 14, 2014; 978-1-4215-6508-8
533. "Suspicious Behavior" (挙動不審!?, Kyodō Fushin!?); 534. "The Fateful Premiere" (因縁の試写会, In'nen no Shishakai); 535. "Panic at the Wedding Hall" (式場パニック, Shikijō Panikku); 536. "The Uninvited Guest" (招かれざる客, Manekarezaru Kyaku); 537. "Wedding Battle" (ウエディング・バトル, Uedingu Batoru); 538. "The Topsy-Turvy Room" (常識はずれの部屋, Jōshiki Hazure no Heya); 539. "The Upside-Down Mystery" (逆さまミステリー, Sakasama Misuterī); 540. "What He Wanted to Hide" (隠したかったもの, Kakushitakattamono); 541. "Serena's Red Handkerchief" (園子の赤いハンカチ, Sonoko no Akai Hankachi"; lit. Sonoko's Red Handkerchief); 542. "A Name in Katakana" (カタカナの名前, Katakana no Namae); 543. "Superman" (スーパーマン, Sūpāman)
Agasa and the Junior Detectives await the premiere of the feature film Star Blades VI (which resembles the Star Wars franchise), but a fan in line who helps photograph the kids with the characters leaves mysteriously. Conan stops the man from committing suicide and pinning the blame on another man. Later, Takagi and Yumi are substituting for a wedding couple in order to capture a serial killer who broke into the couple's apartment and then threatened to attack them on their wedding day. On the day of a book deadline, an author murders his ghost writer, but the Junior Detectives enter the ghost writer's house when their ball had entered the premises, and they find that the murdered person with his belongings nearby have all been turned upside down. Serena takes Rachel and Conan to a movie location hoping to tie a red handkerchief in a maple tree and wait for her love Makoto, but finds that the film location is full of handkerchiefs. An assistant film director there mentions he was hired recently to find the original location that inspired the scene, but he is soon found murdered.
53	From Kaito, With Love	February 17, 2006; 978-4-09-120110-2	January 13, 2015; 978-1-4215-6509-5
544. "Crimson" (紅蓮, Guren); 545. "Golden" (金色, Konjiki); 546. "Verdure" (青嵐, Seiran); 547. "Lily White" (純白, Junpaku); 548. "The Fiend with 200 Faces" (怪人二百面相, Kaijin Ni-hyaku Mensō); 549. "Operation Class 1-B" (1年B組大作戦, Ichinen Bī-gumi Dai Sakusen); 550. "Sole Witness" (目撃者は一人, Mokugekisha wa Hitori); 551. "Nail and Snake" (釘とへび, Kugi to Hebi); 552. "Hammer" (トンカチの正体, Tonkachi no Shōtai); 553. "A Mysterious Job" (不可思議なバイト, Fukashigi na Baito); Extra: "10th Anniversary Celebration Case Closed Movie Guide"
A painter hires Richard along with Rachel and Conan to protect his newest painting from being stolen by the Kaito Kid. Right before the scheduled time of Kid's arrival, the painting is stolen but this time the painter's father-in-law is murdered, marking the first time the Kaito Kid has been suspected of killing someone. Conan suspects the Kid will return to clear his name. Ms. Kobayashi sets up a mystery for her class to solve, but pulls Conan from the class so he doesn't spoil it. The FBI discuss how to use Rena Mizunashi as bait to lure out the Black Organization. A boy comes to Richard's agency claiming to have seen the body of a murdered rock star being thrown off the bridge. They look for the scene of the crime and possible suspects based on the boy's eyewitness account. Eisuke accompanies them but Conan grows more suspicious of him every time. Eisuke brings in a case where a person is being paid 50,000 yen a day for taking people's trash, putting them in a van, and leaving it there, then when the next trash day comes, switch the old trash for new trash for another payment. When they go to investigate, they discover a murder and that the victim's son was the kid that Mizunashi had saved right before she went into a coma.
54	The Moving Shrine Room	June 16, 2006; 978-4-09-120377-9	April 14, 2015; 978-1-4215-6510-1
554. "Dinner Menu" (夕食の献立, Yūshoku no Kondate); 555. "Dreaming Star" (夢見るスター, Yume Miru Sutā); 556. "The Detective League's Snowman" (探偵団の雪ダルマ, Tantei-dan no Yuki Daruma); 557. "Trajectory of the Fall" (転落の軌跡, Tenraku no Kiseki); 558. "Catastrophe in the Mountains" (破局の雪山, Hakyoku no Yukiyama); 559. "The Devouring Room" (人を飲む部屋, Hito o Nomu Heya); 560. "The Illusory Corpse" (幻の死体, Maboroshi no Shitai); 561. "Secret of the Bloodstain" (血痕のカラクリ, Kekkon no Karakuri); 562. "The Teen Detective of the West" (東の高校生探偵, Higashi no Kōkōsei Tantei); 563. "Detective Koshien" (探偵甲子園, Tantei Kōshien); 564. "The Locked Room Solution" (密室証明, Misshitsu Shōmei)
Conan solves the case of the mysterious boy's mother's murder, and realizes the woman who questioned the boy was Vermouth. Later, the Junior Detectives are building a snowman at a ski resort when they meet some art school students who are making an ice sculpture snowman for their project. One of the students is later found dead in a nearby pond but it is not clear who might have gone out of their way to place her there. Richard takes Conan, Rachel, Harley and Kazuha to a cherry blossom festival. There, a monk exclaims that he has seen a dead body in their temple, but when they check, it has disappeared. Harley takes Conan to a detective koshien tournament that involves three other high school detectives. At a remote island, they are asked to solve a locked room mystery, but when one of the detectives figures it out and then re-creates the mystery, he ends up murdered.
55	The Mystery of Lavender Manor	September 15, 2006; 978-4-09-120628-2	July 14, 2015; 978-1-4215-7784-5
565. "The Sleuths' Grand Deduction" (探偵たちの名推理, Tantei-tachi no Mei Suiri); 566. "Hot-Blooded Detective" (熱血探偵, Nekketsu Tantei); 567. "George Shoots" (元太のシュート, Genta no Shūto"; lit. Genta's Shot); 568. "George and El" (元太とエル, Genta to Eru"; Genta and El); 569. "Mischievous Child" (イタズラ坊主, Itazura Bōzu); 570. "Under the Moon" (月下, Gekka); 571. "Dawn" (黎明, Reimei); 572. "High Noon" (白昼, Hakuchū); 573. "Sunset (落日, Rakujitsu); 574. "Eva's Secret (1)" (秘密の妃英理①, Himitsu no Kisaki Eri Ichi"; lit. Eri Kisaki's Secret (1)); 575. "Eva's Secret (2)" (秘密の妃英理②, Himitsu no Kisaki Eri Ni"; lit. Eri Kisaki's Secret (2))
A high school detective was murdered at the site of the detective koshien, but each of the remaining detectives as well as Conan have a different suspect. After the Tokyo Ravens soccer team loses a game, Agasa and the Junior Detectives plan to commiserate by having cake at a store, but George is no mood, and kicks around a soccer ball in the parking garage when the ball bumps a car. The owner, who is a foreigner, scolds Genta, but he is later found badly beaten, and points at George, who thinks he is a suspect. In the school library, Conan comes across an old leather wallet with a message from Rachel, and recounts to the Junior Detectives and Ms. Kobayashi how ten years ago, Jimmy and Rachel as first-graders had been tracking down a series of clues left by an unknown man, later revealed to be Toichi Kuroba, father of the Kaito Kid. On the anniversary of Rachel's parents' first date, Rachel and Conan spot her mother at a restaurant with another man, Rachel suspects she is cheating on her father.
56	Season of The Witch	January 13, 2007; 978-4-09-120706-7	October 13, 2015; 978-1-4215-7784-5
576. "Engagement Ring?! (1)" (婚約指輪!?①, Engēji Ringu Ichi); 577. "Engagement Ring?! (2)" (婚約指輪!?②, Engēji Ringu Ni); 578. "Engagement Ring?! (3)" (婚約指輪!?③, Engēji Ringu San); 579. "The Witch Legend Mystery (1)" (鬼婆伝説殺人事件①, Onibaba Densetsu Satsujin Jiken Ichi); 580. "The Witch Legend Mystery (2)" (鬼婆伝説殺人事件②, Onibaba Densetsu Satsujin Jiken Ni); 581. "The Witch Legend Mystery (3)" (鬼婆伝説殺人事件③, Onibaba Densetsu Satsujin Jiken San); 582. "Evidence from the West" (西からの手がかり, Nishi kara no Tegakari); 583. "Location of the Photograph" (写真の行方, Shashin no Yukue); 584. "The Company" (カンパニー, Kanpanī); 585. "Wrong Number" (間違い電話!?, Machigai Denwa!?); 586. "Blood Will Tell" (血が語る真実, Chi ga Kataru Shinjitsu")
A mystery novelist that was going to do an interview with Richard is murdered in a locked room while holding the sole key to the room in his hand. During the investigation, Sato appears to be wearing an engagement ring that Takagi did not give her. After the car breaks down, Agasa and the Junior Detectives stay at a nearby house owned by an old lady that the kids think could be a witch. Three people also stay there due to their car running out of gas. When one of the guests is murdered with her throat slit, Mitch thinks the old lady did it because he saw her brandishing a knife. Later, Conan gets a lead from Harley that Eisuke Hondo's father had once had his picture taken. When they go to the photographer's place, they discover the person's photos had been erased. Later, Rachel, Serena and Conan run into Eisuke at the hospital. They then attempt to visit a man with tapes of Rena Mizunashi to see whether or not she is Eisuke's sister. Conan learns that the man is not home, but he seems to have had his phone number changed and needs money, which Conan suspects is a scam.
57	A Devil of a Case	April 5, 2007; 978-40-91-21110-1	January 12, 2016; 978-1-4215-7785-2
587. "A Mother's Memento" (母の遺品, Haha no Ihin); 588. "The Gloves of Death" (死を呼ぶ片手袋, Shi o Yobu Katatebukuro); 589. "The Killer from Hades" (黄泉からの殺人者, Yami kara no Satsujinsha); 590. "The Gloves of Sorrow" (哀しみの手袋, Kanashimi no Tebukuro); 591. "The Demon Cometh" (悪魔が来たりて..., Akuma ga Kitarite...); 592. "The Demon's Trap" (悪魔のカラクリ, Akuma no Karakuri); 593. "The Demon's Tears" (悪魔の涙, Akuma no Namida); 594. "Fugitive" (逃亡者, Tōbōsha); 595. "The Crow's Song" (鴉の唄, Karasu no Uta); 596. "The Second String" (2本目の糸, Nihonme no Ito); 597. "The False Patient" (偽りの患者, Itsuwari no Kanja)
Conan and Rachel join Richard and Eisuke as they visit Eisuke's past home to investigate a mysterious murder a year ago. However, the person who hired Richard is soon found hanged. Yoko invites the Junior Detectives to the studio where they are filming Samurai Kid. They meet rock star Satan Onizuka of the band Styx III, but his agent is later found murdered, and Satan becomes the prime suspect, except that he claims he has been in his room the entire time and that he has had his makeup on the entire time. Richard goes on the run when he suspects some of the people he had been tailing are pursuing him. When Eisuke starts visiting the hospital where Rena is hiding, Conan and Jodie are worried that the Black Organization may be on the move to retrieve Rena, and that Eisuke's father was part of the CIA so they might have interests in the situation. They realize that the Black Organization might have planted a fake patient at the hospital, so Conan devises a scheme to find out who that could be.
58	The Clash of Red and Black	July 18, 2007; 978-4-09-121155-2	April 12, 2016; 978-1-4215-7786-9
598. "Pursuit And..." (追跡、そして..., Tsuiseki, Soshite...); 599. "Akai's Past" (赤井の過去, Akai no Kako); 600. "All or Nothing..." (イチかバチか..., Ichikabachika...); 601. "Deception" (擬装, Gisō); 602. "Last Resort" (最終手段, Saishū Shudan); 603. "Mission" (任務, Misshon); 604. "Sister and Brother" (姉弟, Kyōdai); 605. "An Unexpected Suspect" (意外な容疑者, Igai no Yōgisha); 606. "Friday the 13th" (13日の金曜日, Jū-san Nichi no Kin'yōbi); 607. "Camel's Past" (キャメルの過去, Kyameru no Kako); 608. "Magic Spell" (魔法の呪文, Mahō no Jumon)
Conan is able to deduce which of the three patients is associated with the Black Organization, but the patient escapes and kills himself. The FBI plans to transport Rena to another hospital using a decoy convoy of three different vans. The Black Organization sends a bomb package, and the gang must scramble to defuse the bomb with Jodie and an agent by the name of Andre Camel driving the bomb to dump into a river. During that time, the Black Organization then cause mass food poisoning, fires, and other explosions, sending a swarm of patients to the hospital along with their fake patients bringing more bombs, as well as a fake broadcast that Rena has awakened. The FBI has no choice but to deploy the decoy vans. As they drive out, the Black Organization is able to determine which of the three vans contains Rena, who then breaks free and knocks out Andre. Rena returns to the organization as Kir while Andre's van is blown up in an explosion. Afterwards, it is revealed that it was a plan to get Rena back into the Organization as a mole, that she really is Eisuke's sister, and that she and their father were part of the CIA. Akai and Andre's past is also revealed both with connections to the FBI and the Black Organization as well as with Anita's sister. In a different case, Takagi and the Junior Detectives investigate the murder of a talent agent with the prime suspects all being foreigners who speak English, one of whom is Andre. Questioning Kir's loyalty, the Black Organization have her call Akai out to a remote place where Kir will kill Akai.
59	Hair Today, Gone Tomorrow	October 18, 2007; 978-4-09-121199-6	July 12, 2016; 978-1-4215-8385-3
609. "Wedge of Steel" (鋼の楔, Hagane no Kusabi); 610. "The Sound" (音, Oto); 611. "The Flying Body" (空飛ぶ死体, Soratobu Shitai); 612. "Mechanics of an Alibi" (力学とアリバイ, Rikigaku to Aribai); 613. "Centipede" (百足, Mukade); 614. "Armored Samurai" (鎧武者, Yoroi Musha); 615. "The Art of War" (兵法, Heihō); 616. "Furinkazan" (風林火山, Fūrinkazan); 617. "War" (戦, Ikusa); 618. "Shadow and Lightning" (陰と雷, Kage to Kaminari); 619. "Eisuke Accused" (疑惑の瑛祐, Giwaku no Eisuke)
Kir shoots Akai in the chest and then in the head, followed by a car explosion; the tragic news of having found Akai's body sends Jodie into tears. Later, Eva Kaden is getting her hair done when a male model is murdered and her hairdresser becomes the primary suspect. Richard is hired by the Torada family to investigate the death of their son who was thrown in a tornado, with a centipede placed mysteriously by his corpse. They suspect their rival Tatsuo family whose son was also recently killed with a centipede placed by his head, but who also hired Harley Hartwell. The two detectives also learn of the murder of an expert yabusame (horseback) archer from six years ago, but since then the families' younger generation had gotten along with each other, even collaborating on a treasure hunt for the legendary Takeda Shingen. However, that night, when Kazuha and Rachel see a silhouette of a samurai and then tell the family, the spouse of the current archer in the competition freaks out and locks herself in the bathroom; she is later found hanging dead in a tree. Conan and Harley determine a pattern in the murder victims that is related to a famous quote from Sun Tzu's The Art of War involving Wind, Earth, Forest and Fire, but have to rethink it when the next victim is killed by electricity. Conan suspects someone is tailing Eisuke as he joins him, Rachel and Serena at a karaoke bar. The supposed follower is then mysteriously murdered.
60	Grounds for Murder	January 12, 2008; 978-4-09-121266-5	October 11, 2016; 978-1-4215-8386-0
620. "The Missing Blunt Instrument" (消えた鈍器, Kieta Donki); 621. "Eisuke's Confession" (瑛祐の告白, Eisuke no Kokuhaku); 622. "Red, White, Yellow" (赤白黄色, Aka Shiro Kiiro); 623. "Black and White" (クロシロ君, Kuroshiro-kun); 624. "The New Neighbor" (新たな隣人, Arata na Rinjin); 625. "The Hammer Man" (ハンマー男, Hanmā Otoko); 626. "Delivery of Malice" (届けられた悪意, Todokerareta Akui); 627. "The Hammer Man's Identity" (ハンマー男の正体, Hanmā Otoko no Shōtai); 628. "Deadly Coffee" (殺意のコーヒー, Satsui no Kōhī); 629. "An Impossible Crime" (不可能犯罪, Fukanō Hanzai); 630. "The Bitter Truth" (苦い真実, Nigai Shinjitsu)
A man is beaten to death at a karaoke bar with a blunt weapon, but it can not be found. After Conan solves the case, Eisuke tells Conan he plans to go to America to become a CIA agent, but first he wants to confess his love to Rachel and wants to make Jimmy Kudo is okay with it. When Conan replies that he can't do that, Eisuke reveals that he has already known that Conan is Jimmy. Later, a schoolmate hires the Junior Detectives to track down someone who has been wandering about his apartment at night. Later that night, the apartment was on fire, and the boy and his father, the landlord, are badly burned. The only clue to the case is the boy's diary where he nicknamed the men Red, White, and the suspect Yellow. During the case, Anita gets a fearful sensation one of the men could be from the Black Organization. A serial killer called the Hammer Man is on the loose. Takagi and Sato stake out an apartment that is visited by three food delivery people, one of whom appears to have been hit by the Hammer Man. Richard is invited to be on a television show but they find a person who was poisoned by coffee in a locked apartment.
