= Crime preparation =

Crime preparations are acts or actions performed by criminal offenders during any period of time before the actual crime is committed and range from mere intent to overt action.

In some jurisdictions, the very act of preparing for a crime is a criminal offense in itself, though it is generally viewed as being natural behavior for lawbreakers. The preparations that criminals take prior to their illegal actions are very often prosecuted as inchoate offenses, described in law as the crime of preparing for or seeking to commit another crime. The most common examples of an inchoate offense are conspiracy and the possession of tools necessary to execute the crime or crimes. "Inchoate offense" has been defined as "Conduct deemed criminal without actual harm being done, provided that the harm that would have occurred is one the law tries to prevent."

== Selected common preparations ==
Since criminals often to do act randomly to lead into their crimes, they often conspire and prepare greatly the executions of their action, their getaways, and their success in not being found out. Law enforcement and investigators in the field of forensic psychology describe these activities as most often being performed by the "organized offender".

=== Conspiracy ===
In criminal law, a conspiracy is an agreement between two or more persons to break the law at some time in the future. Criminal law in some countries or for some conspiracies may require that at least one overt act must also have been undertaken in furtherance of that agreement, to constitute an offense. There is no limit on the number participating in the conspiracy and, in most countries, no requirement that any steps have been taken to put the plan into effect. For the purposes of concurrence, the actus reus is a continuing one and parties may join the plot later and incur joint liability and conspiracy can be charged where the co-conspirators have been acquitted or cannot be traced. Finally, repentance by one or more parties does not affect liability but may reduce their sentence.

=== Solicitation ===
It is the action or instance of soliciting; petition; proposal. In criminal law, it most commonly refers to the act of offering money to someone with the specific intent of inducing that person to commit a crime.

=== Stalking ===
Stalking is the unwanted and repeated surveillance of a person by another individual or group.

=== Gathering of tools and clothing ===
The possession of tools used to facilitate a crime and clothing used to conceal the identity of the offender is usually prosecuted as 'possession of burglary tools'. An example can be: "The bank robber packed a crow bar, lock picks, and a saw to be used to break into the bank and its vault. Before he ventured towards the bank, the robber put on sunglasses and a ski mask to hide his face, and he slid on a pair of leather gloves to hide his fingerprints".

== See also ==
- Crime scene getaway
