= Case Closed season 3 =

Season of television series

Case Closed
- Season 3
- The Viridian edition of the third season DVD boxset of the series Case Closed released by Funimation Entertainment
- No. of episodes: 28 (Japanese); 29 (English)

Release
- Original network: NNS (ytv)
- Original release: April 21 – November 24, 1997

Season chronology
- ← Previous; Season 2 Next → Season 4

The third season of the Case Closed anime was directed by Kenji Kodama and produced by TMS-Kyokuichi and Yomiuri Telecasting Corporation. The series is based on Gosho Aoyama's Case Closed manga series, known as Detective Conan (名探偵コナン, Meitantei Conan) in Japan due to legal issues. The plot in these episodes continues Jimmy Kudo's life as a young child named Conan Edogawa and features the introduction of the gentleman thief, Phantom Thief Kid.

The episodes use six pieces of theme music: one opening theme and two closing themes in the Japanese episodes and one opening theme and two ending themes in the English adaption. The Japanese opening theme is "Nazo" (謎, lit. "Mystery") by Miho Komatsu. The ending theme was "Hikari to Kage no Roman" (光と影のロマン, lit. "Romance of Light and Shadow") by Keiko Utoko until episode seventy. Thereafter "Kimi ga inai Natsu" (君がいない夏, lit. "Summer Without You") by Deen was used for the rest of the season. The English opening theme was "Nazo", with English lyrics by Stephanie Nadolny. The first English ending theme was "Hikari to Kage no Roman" with English lyrics also by Stephanie Nadolny, used until episode seventy-two. It was followed by "Kimi ga inai Natsu" with English lyrics by Carl Finch.

The season initially ran from April 21, 1997, through November 24, 1997, on Nippon Television Network System in Japan. Episodes fifty-five to eighty-two were later collected into seven DVD compilations by Shogakukan and were released on March 24, 2006. The season was later licensed and dubbed by Funimation Entertainment and released in ten DVD compilations between August 24, 2004, and December 20, 2005. They were later collected into a DVD boxset on November 25, 2008, containing episodes fifty-three to seventy-nine (fifty-two to seventy-six in the Japanese numbering). The Viridian edition of the season was slated for release on March 23, 2010.

== Episode listing ==
Orig.^{Jp.}	Funi.^{Eng.}	No. in season	Crunchyroll translated title/Funimation title Original Japanese title	Directed by	Written by	Original release date
55	57	1	"The Train Trick Murder Case" / "Train Trick"; Transliteration: "Ressha Torikku Satsujin Jiken" (Japanese: 列車トリック殺人事件)	Susumu Ishizaki	Junichi Miyashita	April 21, 1997
Richard, Rachel, and Conan are on their way home and meet Dr. Josh Sadler and Dr. Delaney at Hananomachie Station with multiple lines, the Yunoyama Line and Hananomachi Line, but scheduling of trains only five minutes apart makes a normal change of trains impossible. At Mizunokawa Line, David Albright, another doctor, has been poisoned to death. Conan establishes murder and suspects Dr. Delaney after learning the victim was spreading rumors which led to a fist fight the night before. A train sales clerk remembers David because she had given him change in coins before. Dr. Delaney has an alibi, having rode the train with Conan's group. When Rachel forgets to get Serena a souvenir, Conan pieces the clues together and tranquilizes Richard, revealing Dr. Delaney as the killer. Dr. Delaney, after donning a disguise, placed an urgent phone call claiming to left important documents behind, delaying the victim's train. He sprinted up and poisoned David, took his money to make it appear as a robbery turned deadly, and returned to his train. As evidence, the coins in David's possession have the sales clerk's fingerprints on them. Dr. Delaney confesses that the rumors David spread were true and is arrested.
56	58	2	"The Ojamanbo Murder Case" / "The Sunfish Murder"; Transliteration: "Ojamanbō Satsujin Jiken" (Japanese: おじゃマンボウ殺人事件)	Yasuhiro Matsumura	Kazunari Kochi	April 28, 1997
Conan, Rachel, and Richard are out jogging when Phillip Baker, the Eastern Branch Vice-President of Ojamanbou Cleaning Company, is crushed to death by a falling beam. Conan suspects Nathan Greene, the company president, to be the killer, especially after learning the victim dated Crystal Greene, the suspect's sister. During the investigation, Conan spots scratches from the opposite building next door and a groove on the company building's rooftop, then tranquilizes Richard to explain Nathan Greene is in fact the killer. Nathan tied a metal cable to the surveillance camera and steel beam, then, while using Phillip's harmonica as bait and watching him with binoculars from a mirror on the company's truck, manually moved the camera which caused the beam to fall on Phillip. As evidence, Nathan's reflection from the opposite building can be seen removing the metal cable on the same camera he used to murder the victim. Nathan confesses, stating Phillip broke up with Crystal for a wealthy woman, resulting in her having to work for another company where she later died in an accident, the same way Phillip was killed.
57	59	3	"The Holmes Freak Murder Case (Part 1)" / "Footsteps of the Hero (Part 1)"; Transliteration: "Hōmuzu Furīku Satsujin Jiken (Zenpen)" (Japanese: ホームズフリーク殺人事件（前編）)	Yasuichiro Yamamoto	N/A	May 5, 1997
Conan enters a Sherlock Holmes contest to win a first-edition book and persuades Rachel and Richard to attend. Betsy Iwai, an inn employee, drives contestants Nancy Schmidt, Moira Krupp, Ernie Bower, Burt Bledsoe, Alex Carr and Sheila Sands to the completely isolated cliff-side inn where they must take a 1,000-question quiz about Sherlock Holmes. Harley Hartwell attends as well hoping he would meet Jimmy there. Harry Kanucka, the host, goes over the rules, regulations, and itinerary. After two days of inactivity, Harry is finally seen driving his car toward the cliff. While the other contestants believe it is a part of the game, Conan and Harley find something amiss and rush to stop Harry. They find a blanket covering the dashboard and hear a hissing sound coming from inside. Their cries and pleads are ignored and the car goes over the cliff, exploding upon crashing into the ocean rocks below. Escape is impossible as the cell phones have been destroyed and the second car's battery is dead and gas tank leaking. Harry is believed to have been murdered and Sheila reveals she knows who the murderer is. Later, a garage fire occurs and Sheila is killed; her charred remains are found in the backseat of the car. The evidence shows that she was also murdered. Some contestants suggest that the host Harry Kanucka might have faked his death but Conan and Harley reassure them that he is dead. While gathering the little evidence that they have, a blackout occurs and Ernie is stabbed in the arm from the back with an ice pick. The killer escapes out the window, but Conan and Harley believe that he is still there.
58	60	4	"The Holmes Freak Murder Case (Part 2)" / "Footsteps of the Hero (Part 2)"; Transliteration: "Hōmuzu Furīku Satsuji Jiken (Kōhen)" (Japanese: ホームズフリーク殺人事件（後編）)	Yasuichiro Yamamoto	N/A	May 12, 1997
Ernie survives his attack in the dark. After Conan reveals his deductions, Harley believes Conan is actually Jimmy Kudo. Harley reveals that Harry had already undergone rigor mortis while in the car. Conan tranquilizes Harley, not wanting to risk using Richard, and accuses Alex Carr. With knowledge on rigor mortis, Alex placed Harry in the car after murdering him, then placed his foot on the brake. Once rigor mortis had set in, he turned on the car's heater (using the blanket to hide this fact) allowing rigor mortis to leave quicker than usual, shifted the car into drive, and opened the garage. This eases pressure on the brake and causing the car to accelerate into the ocean. For Sheila's murder, Alex lured her with first-edition Sherlock Holmes book by claiming that it was hidden in the car, which had a punctured gas tank and dead batteries. Sheila, not able to see in the dark with no car lights, used her lighter, which ignited the gasoline causing the fire that brutally killed her. Since the garage fire was designed for Ernie Bower, Alex desperately created a blackout and stabbed him. As evidence of Alex's crimes, Conan reveals that Alex did not answer a single question on the questionnaire, since he knew that the host was already dead. Ernie demands to know Alex's motives; Alex reveals he despised "Irene Adler's Sneer", a book created by the host Kanucka and Ernie that had Sherlock's equal Irene Adler laughing at him. Harley wakes up and decides to blackmail Conan into revealing who he really is by telling him that he will tell Rachel if he doesn't tell him the truth. Afterwards, Conan reveals his identity to Harley, as well as how the Black Organization gave him a poison that caused him to shrink.
59	61	5	"The First Errand Murder" / "Shopping Can Be Murder"; Transliteration: "Hajimete no Otsukai Satsujin Jiken" (Japanese: 初めてのお使い殺人事件)	Johei Matsura	Junichi Miyashita	May 19, 1997
Conan and the Junior Detective League volunteer to follow and videotape participants of the "Toddler Shopping Day". While following Christopher, a series of strange events occur. Conan deduces that the child witnessed a murder. The boy, not understanding what he had seen or that he is in danger, continues to shop. The culprit kidnaps Hiroshi, drugging him and placing him with another man's body in a building to be demolished that day. The man then locks Conan and the gang in the room and escapes. As the building begins to fall apart, Conan finds a water pipe that leads outside, and safely guides everyone out of the building and confronts the killer. He reveals that the dead man was a loan shark who loaned him the money he used to build his grocery store. He claims that he killed the loan shark because even though he had paid off the loan, the man kept demanding for more money until nothing was left. The boy awakens, asking the former shopkeeper for items on his list, bringing him to tears that someone actually remembered his store. In a twisted way, the situation is humorous; the ex-shopkeeper could have gotten away with the murder, since Hiroshi never actually saw the body.
60	62	6	"The Illustrator Murder Case" / "Illustrated Murder"; Transliteration: "Irasutorētā Satsujin Jiken" (Japanese: イラストレーター殺人事件)	Masashi Abe	N/A	May 26, 1997
Horace Hennegraf, a married man and renowned painter with a specialty in crime scenes, murders his fellow artist and mistress, Sadie Olivette, in a violent outburst after she threatens to reveal to the world that she did 60% of the drawings he took credit for. Instead of owning up to his mistake, Horace covers his crime in an even more gruesome manner; while across the street at his office, Richard, Rachel, Conan, and Horace's staff all watch Sadie apparently jump to her death. Conan gets involved and is beyond sure that Horace Hennegraf is the killer after catching him in a series of lies during the investigation. Can Conan dig deep in this disturbing case, match wits, and expose Horace for the vicious man he really is?
61	63	7	"The Ghost Ship Murder Case (Part 1)" / "Ghost Ship Murder (Part 1)"; Transliteration: "Yūreisen Satsujin Jiken (Zenpen)" (Japanese: 幽霊船殺人事件（前編）)	Susumu Ishizaki	Yuichi Higurashi	June 2, 1997
The Ryujinmaru, an abandoned ship said to carry $1 billion dollars in gold, makes an appearance after being missing for several years; however, the gold is nowhere to be found. Richard, accompanied by Conan and Rachel, is invited by Chief Mikami to speak on the matter where he arrives on stage completely drunk. A miniature bomb explodes and Richard's buttocks is scorched. Conan speaks with Edmund Hanratty who explains to him of the Pirate's Curse. One night, a university professor was decapitated by a pirate while investigating a haunted cave. Two men, Rex Lager and Hank Hamada, encounter each other but Hank wants nothing to do with Rex and leaves. Richard discovers that Chief Mikami has no intentions of turning the gold over when found. Mikami betrays him and forces him to stay on the island. Later that night, Richard is attacked again and chases his attacker but is bashed in the head. He is subsequently arrested, apparently for killing Hank Hamada, his alleged attacker and lighthouse care-taker, by impaling him through his neck with a katana. Conan must prove his innocence or Richard could face life behind bars.
62	64	8	"The Ghost Ship Murder Case (Part 2)" / "Ghost Ship Murder (Part 2)"; Transliteration: "Yūreisen Satsujin Jiken (Kōhen)" (Japanese: 幽霊船殺人事件（後編）)	Yasuichiro Yamamoto	Yuichi Higurashi	June 9, 1997
Conan works on Hank's gruesome murder and finds marks on the victim's arm. He stuns Richard, using his voice to explain his innocence: he could not have killed Hank because Hank was already murdered and Richard was simply lured to the scene in an attempt by the killer to frame him. Hank Hamada had been tortured, most likely for information on the missing treasure, prior to his grisly demise. While investigating, Conan searches the lighthouse, discovering that Hank is connected to the Ryumaru. He and Suzu find a staircase in the cave which breaks away and stumble upon Rex Lager, dead from an apparent suicide. Conan quickly debunks this stating he was shot in the right side of his head and the gun was in his left hand. Edmund Hanratty then reveals himself as the killer with greed as his motive. He explains that Hank Hamada decapitated the university professor, which worsen the Pirate's Curse. Hank and Rex were on the Ryujinmaru years ago but Hank threw the captain and Rex overboard to get the gold for himself. Seeing how Hank and Rex had history together, he murdered them both and attempted to frame Richard for Hank's murder. The gold is found in the bricks of the staircase covered in moss and another cave-in occurs. Conan catches Edmund off guard and subdues him by kicking a brick in his stomach. He, Suzu, and the apprehended killer leave the cave where the gold is sealed inside forever, thus ending the curse.
63	65	9	"The Giant Monster Gomera Murder Case" / "Gomera!"; Transliteration: "Ōkaijū Gomera Satsujin Jiken" (Japanese: 大怪獣ゴメラ殺人事件)	Kazuo Nogami	N/A	June 16, 1997
When Conan and the gang visit a movie set someone in the Gomera costume stabs the man in charge of the whole movie building. Conan discovers that the person who played Gomera is the killer. He managed to fool everyone because he stabbed himself as a cover-up and his closest friend on set became his accomplice during the murder out of hate for the victim. He reveals the motive for his crime: the victim wanted to end the Gomera franchise and stole his script to make into a new movie. The success of what was meant to be the last Gomera movie causes more sequels to be made, using scripts he continues to write in prison.
64	66	10	"The 3rd Set of Fingerprints Murder Case" / "The Three Fingerprints"; Transliteration: "Daisan no Shimon Satsujin Jiken" (Japanese: 第3の指紋殺人事件)	Johei Matsura	Kazunari Kochi	June 23, 1997
Richard is invited to a barbecue by his colleague, Tompson Edwards and his wife Mira. Suddenly, Tompsom has to leave due to a call from Moreese Cortezini, a gang member Tompson has been trying to pull in for some time. A clanking noise is heard as he gets in his car. Conan notes the situation as odd, and when they go meet with Moreese, they find him dead. Although Tompson claims Moreese pulled a gun out and was killed in the ensuring struggle, Conan suspects murder and searches for clues in Tompson's home. The forensics team says they found three fingerprints: Tompson, Moreese, and an unknown set. Conan stuns Richard and delivers his theory: Tompson Edwards murdered Moreese Cortizini, and the 3/4 of the conversation Edward had prior to meeting Cortizini was a lie to get Richard to come and testify that Edwards went unarmed, when in fact, he had a concealed gun strapped to his ankle, explaining the clanking sound Conan heard when he entered his car. As evidence, the third fingerprint belongs to Mira, Tompson's wife, who found the gun hidden in a VHS case. Tompson confesses, stating he was taking money from the victim to pay for his daughter's medical treatment, but when Moreese threatened to go public with that, he murdered him.
65	67	11	"The Crabs and Whale Kidnapping Case" / "The Crab and Whale"; Transliteration: "Kani to Kujira Yūkai Jiken" (Japanese: カニとクジラ誘拐事件)	Masashi Abe	Kazunari Kochi	June 30, 1997
While out at a bar with Richard and Rachel, Conan overhears a man on the phone with a kidnapper. When he alerts Richard, they find out Koby Erwin's son, Kary Erwin, has been kidnapped and the kidnappers want 50 million yen. The boy is heard saying that he sees crabs and a whale, and it is up to Conan to find the boy before it is too late.
66	68	12	"The Pitch Dark Road Murder Case" / "Moonless Murder"; Transliteration: "Kurayami no Michi Satsujin Jiken" (Japanese: 暗闇の道殺人事件)	Kazuo Nogami	Yutaka Yamada	July 7, 1997
Richard runs into Jim Fleming, his friend from college, who requests him to investigate a banging noise. Whilst drinking in Jim's apartment, one of his windows breaks and Zachery Byers is found dead outside on the street. Conan is baffled when he finds the victim's blood on the wall, the railing and glass from Jim's broken window. After finding a slingshot and red thread in a fishtank, Conan is able to find out who the murderer is. Richard is tranquilized and Conan reveals Torman Lloyd as the killer; he shot rope and string over the railing, tied his sock filled with rocks, and used the glow of the victim's cigarette to bludgeon Zachery to death. It is explained that Torman has been practicing his methods, hence the banging noise that has Jim bothered. Evidence is the victim's blood which can be found within Torman's sock. Torman confesses and reveals that the victim aided him in murdering his wife to claim her life insurance and feared exposure.
67	69	13	"The Stage Actress Murder Case" / "The Case of the Murdered Actress"; Transliteration: "Butai Joyū Satsujin Jiken" (Japanese: 舞台女優殺人事件)	Kazuo Nogami	Yuichi Higurashi	July 14, 1997
Haroshio Constantine, Richard's mentor, decides to pay a visit to the agency but finds out Richard is out on a case. Rachel and Conan take him to the Theater of Arts where they see Richard trying to find who sent a threatening note. Conan learns that the blackmailer is after starring actress Shriva Ordain's life, but she doesn't take the matter serious. During a rehearsal, Shriva drops dead from potassium cyanide slipped in her drink. Every possible angle in Shriva's death is examined amen explored. Richard injures his back trying to dodge a harmless trap and is sent to the hospital. Conan solves the case, puts Constatine to sleep, and shows that someone used a string covered in poison and lowered it into a glass the actress was drinking from to kill her. Her agent, Harmony, is identified as the murderer when marks from pulling the string are seen on her hands. She reveals that her client broke up with her boyfriend, Harmony's ex-fiancée and lead male star, and showed nothing but cold disregard for breaking his heart. Harmony had ended her relationship with him, and aborted his baby she was carrying to help his career and would not let a woman who did not love him ruin him.
68	70	14	"The Night Baron Murder Case (The Murder)" / "Knight Baron Mystery (Part 1)"; Transliteration: "Naito Baron Satsujin Jiken (Jikenhen)" (Japanese: 闇の男爵殺人事件 （事件篇）)	Yasuichiro Yamamoto	N/A	July 21, 1997
Dr. Agasa sends Conan, Rachel, Richard on a paid vacation to Izu Princess Hotel Private Beach in the place of himself and his colleague. It is a mystery tour, where the host will disguise himself as Night Baron (a Booker Kudo-created character) and leaves clues to help the tourists try figuring out which one of the group is really him. The winner gets free room and a software design that is most likely a virus. Seven other people (i.e. Romero Rojas, Heidi Camino, Mark McKean, Winston Cadbury and Clarissa Bunn, karate champ Cliff Reed, and his girlfriend Audra Kelly) are on the tour as well, who get tense instantly when they find out Richard is on the tour too. While staring out on the balcony, the legendary Night Baron appears and pushes Conan over the edge causing him to land in the pool. He lies to Rachel, who notices his clothes are drenched, to keep them from leaving the hotel and wonders why the Night Baron is giving away a powerful computer virus. In the dead of night, the Night Baron is seen falling from the sky and is gruesomely impaled on a statue, horrifying the guests below.
69	71	15	"The Night Baron Murder Case (The Suspicion)" / "Knight Baron Mystery (Part 2)"; Transliteration: "Naito Baron Satsujin Jiken (Giwaku Hen)" (Japanese: 闇の男爵殺人事件（疑惑篇）)	Masato Sato	N/A	July 28, 1997
The Night Baron's corpse is pulled down and is unmasked as Romero Rojas. Everyone believes he fell by accident while trying to sneak into another tour members' hotel rooms from the outside. Due to how oddly Romero is dressed in the costume, Conan concludes that Romero was murdered. During the investigation, Romero's room is inaccessible due to the security lock engaged and the winds are hard. The lock is cut and Conan finds tape on the end. Each member of the tour is questioned in turn, each not having good alibis except for the Moore group. Later, Rachel, Conan and Audra are surprised by Night Baron when they are exiting the elevator. Rachel attacks, but Night Baron easily evades her kicks before running off. Conan tries getting the girls to run after him, but both are stunned. Meanwhile, Conan discovers the trick used to lock Romero's room from the outside and Night Baron's costume is found in the pool. Adding onto the facts is the costume came off Romero's corpse; the thief knocked out the guarding cop who is a third-degree karate black belt.
70	72	16	"The Night Baron Murder Case (The Solution)" / "Knight Baron Mystery (Part 3)"; Transliteration: "Naito Baron Satsujin Jiken (Kaiketsu Hen)" (Japanese: 闇の男爵殺人事件（解決篇）)	Yoshio Suzuki	N/A	August 4, 1997
Rachel proves Cliff's innocence. After Conan learns of the "Princess Wind" he traquilizes Richard and demonstrates the murder using human dummies, revealing Romero was not thrown from his room, but Audra and Cliff's room. This way, the wind from earlier blew Romero's body in alignment with the statue. With Cliff's alibi intact, Audra is revealed to be the killer; she used sleeping pills on Romero, locked his room from the outside using the tape trick Conan showed before, dressed him as the Night Baron, and threw him over her balcony to his death. Cliff discovered her Knight Baron wig, which she did not put on Romero since he already had the same hairstyle, and realizes she murdered him. He stole the costume and dressed as Night Baron in front of her and left out his alibi to keep her from being arrested. Audra confesses Romero hacked into her brother's computer systems years ago, the shock of losing his company forced him into committing suicide. She staged this event and lured him with a fake virus. Audra admits she attempted to scare Richard's party away by pushing Conan into the pool, but failed. Despite her acting to make him forget her, Cliff still stays loyal to her and allows himself to be arrested for aiding her.
71	73	17	"The Stalker Murder Case" / "The Stalker"; Transliteration: "Sutōkā Satsujin Jiken" (Japanese: ストーカー殺人事件)	Johei Matsura	Kazunari Kochi	August 11, 1997
Cary Mantle meets an untimely end when he drinks a bottle of Guts-man Soda laced with poison and collapses dead in front of Richard, Rachel, and Conan while out for a walk. They later learn he was a stalking a young woman named Quinly Peartree. They meet Quinly and speak with her and Conan notes white flakes falling from her hands as she rubs them together. After a thorough investigation, Conan stuns Richard and reveals that Quinly did murder Cary. The bottle had a sticker for a competition that had long since passed, and the one she actually paid for was still in the vending machine when Richard got one. She covered her fingers in glue, explaining the white flakes, to avoid leaving fingerprints and used the stalker's psychotic affection for her to drink a poisoned bottle. Defeated, Quinly reveals she feared for her safety as Cary pushed her down a staircase after she called the police. Conan also reveals that Cary planned to kill her on that day evidenced by the assorted weapons in his bag. Even with this, when Quinly poisoned Cary, she made him the victim. The court will see Cary's bag as circumstantial evidence and her charge will be premeditated murder.
72	74	18	"The Triplets Villa Murder Case" / "Triple Terror"; Transliteration: "Mitsugo Bessō Satsujin Jiken" (Japanese: 三つ子別荘殺人事件)	Kazuo Nogami	N/A	August 18, 1997
Serena invites Rachel and Conan to her family's villa during the summer, where they meet her sister Angie's fiancée, Tod Appenheimer, and his baseball obsessed father, Rodrick, who expresses disdain over his sons' ways of life. Later that night while returning to his villa after watching a baseball game, Rodrick is brutally beaten to death and his watch stolen, allegedly by Todd. Conan and the others witness this. The next day, Tad and Ted, Tod's brothers, arrive, revealing them to be triples. Only Tod's has an alibi since he was talking to someone on the phone using a groundline, leaving his brothers prime suspects. Using Serena, Conan reveals that Ted, the novelist brother, killed Rodrick. He wiretapped his father's watch to track his movements, explaining why it went missing and made the mistake of setting the answering machine's clock ahead to the time of the blackout; no messages could have been recorded then. Defeated, he explains that he needed inspiration to continue his work, and since every writer has had a great tragedy in their lives, he needed to experience one himself.
73	75	19	"The Junior Detective League Shipwreck Case" / "The Ship Wreck Murder"; Transliteration: "Shōnentantei-dan Sōnan Jiken" (Japanese: 少年探偵団遭難事件)	Yoshio Suzuki	Junichi Miyashita	August 25, 1997
The Junior Detective League, along with Rachel and Richard, are at a beach one day when they come across a wealthy couple; Colt Lielander and his wife, Tandi. George finds an SOS in a bottle by the now missing Tandi Lielander, though Colt claims it's her attempt at getting attention. They take a raft and find her in a cave, drowsy. Tandi explains Colt tried to murder her by drugging her and letting the tides rise. The tides have risen to a point where they can not leave the cave. Conan leads the gang through the maze of a cave and escape to a quarry. They encounter Richard and Colt, who is exposed for his crime. Colt holds Amy at gunpoint and threatens to kill everyone, confessing that he discovered Tandi's plans to divorce him despite not being abusive and giving her everything that she wanted. Rachel and an old guard arrive in time to save them. Colt is arrested while Richard is sternly lectured by the old guard for fishing in the quarry, which is off-limits.
74	76	20	"The Shinigami Jinnai Murder Case" / "Jinnai, King of Death"; Transliteration: "Shinigami Jinnai Satsujin Jiken" (Japanese: 死神陣内殺人事件)	Yasuichiro Yamamoto	Masahiro Yokotani	September 1, 1997
A death threat is given to famous actor Harnison Noble, who plays Jinnai, the titular character in a horror movie franchise. Richard accepts the case and meets Vivica Jasmine, Murisa Noble, and Olson Allibaster. While everyone is staking a park with the media, Jinnai makes an eerie appearance and run to Harnison's cond where a gunshot is heard and a silhouette is seen and find Harnison shot to death. Vivica is shot at by the killer during the investigation. After finding the stereo on repeat, unrolled vinyl tape on the floor, and an interesting fax message, Conan tranquilizes Richard then reveals Vivica Jasmine to be the killer, who was clever enough to set up a false outline of a person, and use a silenced gunshot to kill him while using a pre-set gunshot recording to make it seem like he was killed when the recording sounded, instead of later. However, she made two mistakes: one, the record was set on a repeat track, causing her to lie that the killer had passed her to escape the building; two, Harnison's blood stained a faxed page that arrived earlier than when he was supposedly killed. Vivica confesses that Harnison revealed, during his usual drunken state, that he sabotaged the set her love was on while doing a stunt for one of the Jinnai movies, leading to his death.
75	77	21	"The Finance Company President Murder Case" / "Murder and Mahjong"; Transliteration: "Kinyū Kaisha Shachō Satsujin Jiken" (Japanese: 金融会社社長殺人事件)	Johei Matsura	N/A	September 8, 1997
Richard is playing Mahjong with his friends, Oscar and Michael, and they call Jonathan Hyde, president of Hyde Finance, to play with them. He accepts but when he doesn't show up, they find Jonathan dead from cyanide poisoning and three of his employees are suspects: Morgan Cartwright, Allison Summers, and Jeremy Janus. The poison was only found on the victim's thumb, money, and door handle. Allison makes tea, and Jeremy, Allison, and Morgan use the bathroom. After finding bleach in the bathroom, Conan stuns Richard and reveals Allison to be the killer. She took advantage of Jonathan's thumb-licking habit and coated the kettle knob with cyanide knowing Jonathan would touch it with his right thumb. The poison was erased with bleach, evidenced by a drop of iodine that disappeared from Allison's handkerchief. Allison confesses how Kurt, her only friend, committed suicide; the I.O.U. loan from Jonathan found beneath his feet.
76	78	22	"Conan vs. Kaitou Kid^{1 hr.}" / "Phantom Thief 1412 (Part 1)"; Transliteration: "Conan VS Kaitō Kiddo" (Japanese: コナンVS怪盗キッド)	Kazuo Nogami	N/A	September 15, 1997
Phantom Thief 1412, a master of disguise and world renowned gentleman thief, drops a coded message intending to make his appearance known and Richard is tasked with capturing him. Richard, Rachel, and Conan visit the viewing of the Black Star, believed to be Phantom Thief's next target, and notice that it is shinier than most of its kind. Conan deciphers Phantom Thief's note with ease, and finds him on the rooftop of the Hicenth Hotel. He shoots off a firecracker attracting police helicopters. Phantom Theft, in response, perfectly mimics the voice of high ranked officers leaving Conan shocked and stunned, and Phantom Thief himself is surrounded without an exit. Before he can get arrested, Phantom Thief drops a flash bomb, mocks the police, and miraculously vanishes into thin air; all that remains of him is his note announcing he is indeed after the Black Star, the world's largest black pearl, on April 19th. On the Sebastian yacht full of familiar faces, Phantom Thief makes his presence known again, but Conan is hot on his trail.
76	79	23	"Conan vs. Kaitou Kid^{1 hr.}" / "Phantom Thief 1412 (Part 2)"; Transliteration: "Conan VS Kaitō Kiddo" (Japanese: コナンVS怪盗キッド)	Kazuo Nogami	N/A	September 15, 1997
Selma Sebastian (née Peacock) unveils to everyone a replica of the Black Star but states it is worn by "the most suited to wear it." It is an attempt to confuse Phantom Thief. Meanwhile, a card trick performed by Latham Laney is interrupted when Rachel pulls a note out from Phantom Thief out of the deck. This causes everyone to grow concern, and Selma's replicas start to harmlessly explode. The panicking people trample over Selma, who notices her Black Star missing during the commotion. Conan takes Rachel to the boiler room, explaining how Phantom Thief knew Selma had the real Black Star after she described it to Richard as having a "peacock" green luster shine which is a nod on her maiden name. Supporting this is the fact that pearls tend to lose their shine over time; the real Black Star is dull. Conan reveals Phantom Thief to be Rachel as she had the messaged card in her hand the entire time and destroys the phone preventing Phantom Thief from escaping again. On the rooftop, Phantom Thief disguised himself as a police officer and blended in with the rest. Defeated, Phantom Thief gives back the real pearl and escapes with another flash bomb. The real Rachel is found sleeping in one of the life boats.
77	80^{C}	24	"The Case of the Eminent Family's Strange Deaths (Part 1)" / "Mysterious Masked Murder (Part 1)"; Transliteration: "Meika Renzoku Henshi Jiken (Zenpen)" (Japanese: 名家連続変死事件（前編）)	Masato Sato	N/A	September 22, 1997
Richard is recommended by Heizo Hartwell to the Dufour family (Zelda, Zoe who is married to Mitchell Gray, Butler Weathersbee, and Roland, who is a burn victim, wears bandages, and is engaged to Nancy Nesbit) to find Gerard's first love. Harley also makes his presence known, much to Conan's dismay. Gerard falls asleep during his birthday party. Mitchell leaves to find Roland but instead makes an unnerving phone call claiming Roland attacked him in the dark with a knife; Richard looks below the balcony to see, who appears to be, Roland clinching a knife with his bare teeth. They rush to the floor below them and find Mitchell's bloody corpse impaled on the picked fence with a puncture wound on the back of his hand. A two day search for Roland ends with authorities pulling his corpse from the fountain. He had apparently committed suicide by consuming poison for a fire he started years ago, but Conan believes that both men were murdered by the same person.
78	81^{C}	25	"The Case of the Eminent Family's Strange Deaths (Part 2)" / "Mysterious Masked Murder (Part 2)"; Transliteration: "Meika Renzoku Henshi Jiken (Kōhen)" (Japanese: 名家連続変死事件（後編）)	Yasuichiro Yamamoto	N/A	September 29, 1997
After checking Roland's room and talking with the house staff, Conan, in league with Harley, tranquilizes Richard. Roland did commit suicide as atonement for his role in the inn fire years ago. His corpse was buried in the yard, then sank in the fountain. The "Roland" that everyone saw was actually Mitchell in disguise; he faked his attack in order to gain an opportunity to murder Gerard, who was drugged by Mitchell's accomplice. Mitchell never made it to Gerard's room as he was betrayed and killed by his partner who is revealed to be Nancy. As evidence, after pushing Mitchell, Nancy stabbed him in the hand with her fountain pen, when he grabbed ahold of her watch. Nancy confesses that Mitchell, expressing no remorse, was also responsible for the inn fire that killed her parents and attempts suicide but fails. Conan has a moment when he remembers serial killer Nadia Adams from a previous case on Moon Light Island. After the case, Harley heads back to Osaka before calling Conan by his real name by accident.
79	82^{C}	26	"The Bank Robbery Murder Case" / "The Revengeful Robber"; Transliteration: "Ginkō Gōtō Satsujin Jiken" (Japanese: 銀行強盗殺人事件)	Johei Matsuura	Kazunari Kochi	October 6, 1997
After bowling, Rachel, Serena, and an ill Conan head to the bank to run an errand where they meet bank employees Barton Spacklecrisp, Nigel Aramont, Martin Shorzlow, and Eddie Crockerly. Barton gives Conan cough drops to help with his sickness. An armed bank robbery abruptly occurs. A cell phone rings and Martin is shot but survives. Barton jumps in and kills the robber who is identified as Randy Whitman. After finding cough drop wrappers on the floor and listening to a recording of the robbery provided by a bystander named Tave Linster, Conan puts Serena to sleep and explains that Randy had an accomplice who attempted to call him and warn of Martin's interference. Randy's accomplice and eventual killer is revealed to be Barton Spacklecrisp. After Randy unexpectedly shot Martin, everything went haywire and Barton jumped on Randy with every intention of murdering him in order to keep his part of the crime silent. As proof, Randy was also sick and Barton gave him cough drops, the same he gave to Conan, effectively linking the two together. As Barton is taken away, he explains his motive as justice as he and Randy were a part of the same platoon, which half was killed because of Randy.
80	83^{C}	27	"The Hobo Artist Murder Case" / "Dead Hobo"; Transliteration: "Hōrō Gaka Satsujin Jiken" (Japanese: 放浪画家殺人事件)	Nana Harada	Junichi Miyashita	October 13, 1997
Richard, Rachel, and Conan are visiting an art exhibit when they encounter a chain smoking, farsighted homeless man in rag. Conan runs across the same man twice; the man is taken to a hospital where he is diagnosed with amnesia when the Junior Detective League accidentally hits him with their baseball; second, he leaves and is found strangled to death under an overpass. With clues from his sketches, Conan pinpoints the man's house where Amy discovers a picture of the victim, now identified as Troy Haysum. Kimmy, his wife, claims her husband has been dead since last year. Later that night, Richard gives insight on Troy and how he was under suspicion when he allegedly embezzled money from his job. After Conan finds more clues, he lures everyone back to Kimmy's house, stuns Richard, claiming she murdered him when he returned home. As evidence, though Kimmy had a cleaning crew, they did not wipe away a painting that had been sullied with Troy's fingerprints. Kimmy confesses with her motive as greed, having grown impatient waiting for the courts to declare him dead so she could collect the money Troy had. She is arrested for her crime.
81	84^{C}	28	"The Popular Artists Abduction Case (Part 1)" / "Two Times Trouble (Part 1)"; Transliteration: "Ninki Ātisuto Yūkai Jiken (Zenpen)" (Japanese: 人気アーティスト誘拐事件（前編）)	Yasuichiro Yamamoto	N/A	November 20, 1997
The Junior Detective League bumps heads with Korma Delorica, a famous singer from the band Two-Mix. After saving Korma from unwanted attention from fans and media, she treats them to lunch and allows the children to listen to unreleased material at a parlor, where she and her band mate Karman are kidnapped by a man in disguise. The incident is reported, Conan analyzes the lyrics, and Mitch mentions that they ironically coincide with a death near Sonya Temple that was ruled in self-defense. Meanwhile, the kidnappers demand the Junior Detective League to deliver the bag belonging to the singer but is later revealed they are actually after the demo tape. The police tail the Junior Detective League and when they are caught, they discover that Amy and Conan have swapped places; the kidnappers demand Amy to deliver the bag.
82	85^{C}	29	"The Popular Artists Abduction Case (Part 2)" / "Two Times Trouble (Part 2)"; Transliteration: "Ninki Ātisuto Yūkai Jiken (Kōhen)" (Japanese: 人気アーティスト誘拐事件（後編）)	Yasuichiro Yamamoto	N/A	November 27, 1997
Conan gives basic instructions to The Junior Detective League while he meets up with the kidnappers, revealing one of them to be Morshu Esterbaum. Conan reveals Marshu murdered a man on New Year's Eve near Sonya Temple, which in turn, gave Two-Mix the inspiration for their song as they mistook gunshots for fireworks. He got off on grounds of self-defense due to gun residue found on the victim's clothes because Marshu put the gun in the dead man's hand and shot the ground. Marshu confesses; the man he murdered was an accomplice of his in a robbery who then came back to Japan and blackmailed him. The Junior Detective League arrives after calling the police but is tied up along with Conan and Two-Mix. Marshu leaves, setting the room on fire. Karmen is shot during their escape but Korma (actually Conan) kicks a can and subdues him. Marshu and his partner is arrested when authorities arrive. While at the concert, the Junior Detective League accidentally start the music too early, and if stopped it will anger the crowd even more. Conan tries to sing but that angers the crowd. The singer then takes The Junior Detective League out with her to sing.

== Notes ==
- ^Jp. The episode's numbering as followed in Japan
- ^Eng. The episode's numbering as followed by Funimation Entertainment
- ^1 hr. The episodes were aired as a single hour long episode in Japan
- ^C These episodes are part of the fourth season of Case Closed
