= Case Closed season 1 =

Season of television series

Case Closed
- Season 1
- The Viridian Edition of the first season DVD boxset of the series Case Closed released by Funimation Entertainment
- No. of episodes: 28 (Japanese); 29 (English)

Release
- Original network: NNS (ytv)
- Original release: January 8 – August 12, 1996

Season chronology
- Next → Season 2

The first season of the Case Closed anime was directed by Kenji Kodama. It was produced by TMS-Kyokuichi in cooperation with Yomiuri Telecasting Corporation. The series is based on Gosho Aoyama's Case Closed manga series. In Japan, the manga series is titled Detective Conan (名探偵コナン, Meitantei Conan) but Case Closed was adopted for the anime version to avoid legal issues. The series' plot is based on the adventures of a teenage detective Jimmy Kudo, reverted to childhood through a poisoning. The season initially ran January 8, 1996, through August 12, 1996, on Nippon Television Network System in Japan. Episodes one through twenty-eight are collected in a seven DVD compilation produced by Shogakukan and released in Japan between the twenty-second and twenty-fourth of February 2006. The first season was then licensed and dubbed by Funimation Entertainment for release in English speaking countries. Case Closed was aired on Cartoon Network's Adult Swim programming block and on Canada's YTV station. The English adaption was collected and released on a four DVD compilations between February 21, 2006, and September 19, 2006. The English adaption of season one was later released in a DVD boxset by Funimation on July 22, 2008, and contained the first twenty-six episodes, or twenty-five according to the Japanese numbering system. The season one DVD boxset Viridian edition was released on July 14, 2009. For the fifteenth anniversary of the anime series, the episodes were made available for video on demand in Japan. Episodes 1 and 2 were later re-dubbed by Studio Nano as part of a curated episode list, which was released on Crunchyroll and Netflix on July 3, 2025.

In total the first-season episodes use five distinct theme songs: one opening and two closing in the Japanese episodes versus one opening and one closing in the English versions. The Japanese opening theme is "Mune ga Doki Doki" (胸がドキドキ, lit. "My Heart Pounds") by The High-Lows. The first ending theme for the Japanese version is "Step by Step" by Ziggy and was used through episode twenty-six. The remaining episodes use "Meikyuu no Lovers" (迷宮のラヴァーズ, lit. "Lovers of Labyrinth") by Heath as their ending song. The English opening theme song is "Mune ga Doki Doki" with English lyrics and renamed "First New Century". The English ending theme is "Step by Step" with English lyrics. Both theme songs are arranged and sung by Carl Finch. In April 2009, when the first two episodes were re-aired in Japan the music was changed to "Everlasting Luv" by Breakerz for the opening and "Doing all Right" by Garnet Crow for the closing song.

== Episode list ==
Orig.^{Jp.}	Funi.^{Eng.}	No. in season	Crunchyroll translated title/Funimation title Original Japanese title	Directed by	Written by	Original release date	English air date
1	1	1	"The Roller Coaster Murder Case" / "The Big Shrink"; Transliteration: "Jetto Kōsutā Satsujin Jiken" (Japanese: ジェットコースター殺人事件)	Kenji Kodama	Hiroshi Kashiwabara	January 8, 1996	May 24, 2004
A man is murdered during a party and the detective Shinichi Kudo (Jimmy Kudo) is called to solve the case. He reveals that the host is the murderer and solves the case. Shinichi and his friend, Ran Mori (Rachel Moore) then take a trip to an amusement park. While they are there, a man is decapitated during a roller coaster ride. Shinichi reveals the murderer to be the man's ex-girlfriend, Hitomi. He shows that Hitomi used her necklace made of piano wire and a hook in her purse, looped the wire around the victim's neck and hooked the wire onto the roller coaster tracks during the ride. Hitomi explains that the victim broke up with her and she had planned a murder suicide. After solving this case, Shinichi follows two suspicious men in black who were also on the roller coaster and watches them make a clandestine deal. Shinichi is attacked from behind by the two men and forced to take a newly developed poison that should kill him.
2	2	2	"The Kidnapping of the Company President's Daughter" / "The Kidnapped Debutante"; Transliteration: "Shachō Reijō Yūkai Jiken" (Japanese: 社長令嬢誘拐事件)	Toshiya Shinohara	Hiroshi Kashiwabara	January 15, 1996	May 25, 2004
Shinichi (Jimmy) wakes up and finds that he is now in the body of a young child as a result of the poison. After proving his identity to Professor Agasa and explaining the conditions under which he was poisoned Professor Agasa tells Shinichi that he must remain undercover so that the men in black will not find him and try to kill him and the people who are closely related to him. Shinichi takes on the name "Conan Edogawa" and is placed in the care of Ran (Rachel) and her father, Kogoro Mori (Richard Moore) who owns a detective agency which will allow him to gather information on the men in black clothes. That night, Kogoro receives a case to find a man's kidnapped daughter, Akiko. Conan drops subtle hints for Kogoro leading him to conclude that Mr. Aso, the butler, "kidnapped" Akiko. Kogoro receives a phone call stating that Akiko has been kidnapped again. Conan follows the clues from the phone call and locates her again. Once the kidnapper is arrested, Akiko reveals that she asked Aso to fake her kidnapping in an effort to draw her father away from work so that he would spend time with her. The father asks Aso to arrange a vacation for Akiko and himself. Kogoro, happy with his success in solving a difficult case, allows Conan to stay with his family.
3	3	3	"A Murder Behind the Locked Doors of a Celebrity's Apartment" / "Beware of Idols"; Transliteration: "Aidoru Misshitsu Satsujin Jiken" (Japanese: アイドル密室殺人事件)	Masato Sato	Junichi Miyashita	January 22, 1996	May 26, 2004
Three days later, Professor Agasa gives Conan the "voice-changing bow-tie" and tells him that Ran (Rachel) has been worried about Shinichi (Jimmy). After Conan's first day at school his classmates Ayumi Yoshida (Amy Yeager), Mitsuhiko Tsuburaya (Mitch Tennison), and Genta Kojima (George Kaminski) plan to follow Conan home to befriend him. Singer Yoko Okino goes to Kogoro's (Richard's) agency to ask him to investigate a suspected stalking. When they arrive at Yoko's apartment, they find a dead man stabbed in the back with a knife. The dead man was Yoko's high school boyfriend so Yoko becomes one of the three suspects. The other two suspects are Yamagishi Eiichi, Yoko's manager, and Ikezawa Yuko, one of Yoko's rivals. Conan investigates and determines how the crime was committed. After knocking Kogoro unconscious with an ashtray, Shinichi impersonates Kogoro's voice with the voice-changing bow-tie and tells everyone at the scene of crime that the man killed himself. The man made a block of ice with a knife inside it and laid on top of it until the knife was in his back. Later in the week, knowing that Ran has been stressed since Shinichi's disappearance, Conan gives Ran a call while using his bow-tie in order to sound like his normal self since his current voice is his voice when he was a child. He tells Ran that he is on a difficult case and will return when it is solved.
4	4	4	"The Case of the Coded City Map" / "Fish Marks the Spot"; Transliteration: "Dai Tokai Angō Mappu Jiken" (Japanese: 大都会暗号マップ事件)	Hirohito Ochi	Kazunari Kochi	January 29, 1996	May 27, 2004
After visiting an exhibit on hidden treasures Conan and his friends find a piece of paper with symbols and the word "Oro" written on it. A treasure hunt ensues but they do not discover much. Conan, initially not interested in the children's treasure hunt finally realizes that the paper is a treasure map after learning that "Oro" means gold in Italian. That night, Conan determines that the symbols refer to neon light signs on buildings. Following the clues they find gold coins in a sack hanging from the ceiling of an abandoned building. Three suspicious men had been following the kids in order to find the location of the gold. But with Conan's quick thinking, they come up with a plan to capture the men. The three men are Mafia members and the gold was hidden from them by a traitorous accomplice. Later, Ayumi gives Conan a kiss on the cheek, thanking him for saving them while Mitsuhiko and Genta stare jealously.
5	5	5	"The Great Bullet Train Explosion" / "The Time Bomb Express"; Transliteration: "Shinkansen Dai Bakuha Jiken" (Japanese: 新幹線大爆破事件)	Johei Matsura	Junichi Miyashita	February 5, 1996	May 31, 2004
Conan runs into the black-clothed men from the pilot episode while riding the Shinkansen bullet train. He investigates further and realizes they only resemble the original two men. Using his gadget glasses and a bug, Conan overhears their conversation about a bomb in a black suitcase on board the train and that it is set to explode soon. Conan narrows the suspects down to four. Conan realizes a woman with a cellphone mentioned she liked viewing the mountains but her seat was facing the sea. He realizes the men's seats were facing the mountains and deduces that she was the one who met them. Conan, armed with his new power-enhancing kick shoes invented by Professor Agasa, manages to kick the briefcase off the train before it explodes. The woman and the two men are later arrested.
6	6	6	"The Valentine Murder Case" / "Tragic Valentine"; Transliteration: "Barentain Satsujin Jiken" (Japanese: バレンタイン殺人事件)	Yuji Yamaguchi	Toshiki Inoue	February 12, 1996	June 1, 2004
Ran is invited to attend a Valentine's party by Minagawa Katsuhiko and Conan, obviously jealous, follows her. During the party, they meet Katsuhiko's family, Mrs. Minagawa, his little brother Minagawa Susumu, and his tennis club members Wakamatsu Toshihide, Sekiya Kaori, Naomichi, and Watanabe Yoshimi. Dinner is served along with cake and coffee. Katsuhiko, the party's host, drops dead from poison in the yard. Conan investigates and discovers that Katsuhiko was poisoned from the coffee served. Conan uses his newly acquired tranquilizer dart wristwatch to knock out Kogoro and uses his voice changing bow-tie to impersonate his voice. Through Kogoro, Conan reveals that Mrs. Minagawa murdered Katsuhiko; she put poison in the coffee served to everyone. The antidote for the poison was contained in the cake that was eaten by everyone, except for Keenan. Mrs. Minagawa reveals she needed the money in order to save the family house after her husband's business failed. Later, Ran is holding a box of chocolate for Shinichi and decides to eat it with Conan.
7	7	7	"The Threatening Monthly Presents" / "The Case of the Mysterious Gifts"; Transliteration: "Tsuki'ichi Purezento Kyōhaku Jiken" (Japanese: 月いちプレゼント脅迫事件)	Hirohito Ochi	Junichi Miyashita	February 19, 1996	June 2, 2004
Once a month for the past two years surgeon, Ogawa Masayuki, has been receiving anonymous toys and money valued over 25 million yen. He asks for Kogoro's help to determine who is sending the gifts. On Conan's suggestion, they review Ogawa's patient history. During the investigation Ran begins to suspect that Conan is actually Shinichi. When Conan plays a video game Ogawa received, Conan discovers that it belonged to a child named Ogino Tomoya who died during one of Masayuki's operations three years previously. Conan deduces that Masayuki's son, Ogawa Yuta, may be in danger. They find Mr. Ogino, Tomoya's father, and Yuta at the park just in time to prevent the son's murder. Masayuki decides not place any charges and comforts Mr. Ogino regarding his son's death. Conan manages to deceive Ran that evening about his true identity; by having Professor Agasa call her pretending to be Shinichi.
8	8	8	"The Murder of the Art Museum Owner" / "The Art Museum Murder Case"; Transliteration: "Bijutsukan Ōnā Satsujin Jiken" (Japanese: 美術館オーナー殺人事件)	Keitaro Motonaga	Kazunari Kochi	February 26, 1996	June 3, 2004
Ran forces Conan and Kogoro to visit an art museum where a medieval suit of armor is rumored to have moved on its own. They meet Ochiai the Beika Art Museum curator, Iijima, Kubota, and Manaka the owner who plans to convert the museum into a casino despite high profits. The trio finds an unguarded restricted area at the museum, where they find Manaka's corpse pinned to the wall with a sword. Manaka's brutal murder is examined on a security camera where the investigation team witnesses him being killed by a suit of armor; his death mimics Divine Punishment, a portrait depicting a knight slaying a demon. Also in the video, it appears that a sheet of paper, allegedly written by Manaka, points to Kubota being the murderer. Conan realizes that Manaka's pen was retracted during his murder. The bloody armor is found in Kubota's locker but Conan is convinced that he is being framed. He drops hints allowing Kogoro to determine that Ochiai, the museum's curator, is the killer; Ochiai is revealed to have written Kubota's name on the paper in advance, not Manaka. The pen in Ochiai's possession has no ink. Ochiai confesses to the murder as it was his attempt to protect the museum from becoming a casino, then tried to frame Kubota since he was secretly selling museum art pieces. The museum remains open as the public protested against its destruction.
9	9	9	"The Tenkaichi Night Festival Murder" / "Festival Fiasco"; Transliteration: "Tenkaichi Yomatsuri Satsujin Jiken" (Japanese: 天下一夜祭殺人事件)	Masato Sato	Kazunari Kochi	March 4, 1996	June 7, 2004
Sasai Norikazu murders his partner, award winning author Imatake Satoru in cold-blood and coincidentally runs into Conan, Ran, and Kogoro at the Festival of Lights where they take a few pictures. He is approached by Inspector Yokomizo who informs him of Satoru's murder. Conan is certain Norikazu killed Satoru but he has the perfect alibi substantiated with photographs. Although the disposable camera and photos in question have not been tampered with, Conan re-examines the photos and with supporting clues is able to prove that he is the murderer. Kogoro is put to sleep and Conan impersonates his voice to explain that the pictures were taken at the festival the previous year using the same camera, then saved it until the day of the murder. As proof he points out that some of the pictures show an untanned line on Norikazu's wrist, where in others it's pale from his watch. Norikazu confesses that he murdered Satoru out of revenge, whose work was chosen to be published over his at the last minute. Satoru later became famous when he won an award for a previous book and was given a contract. Norikazu, who co-wrote the same book, was left with nothing.
10	10	10	"The Blackmailed Pro Soccer Player" / "Deadly Game"; Transliteration: "Puro Sakkā Senshu Kyōhaku Jiken" (Japanese: プロサッカー選手脅迫事件)	Johei Matsura	Toshiki Inoue	March 11, 1996	June 8, 2004
Akagi Ryoko shows up at Kogoro's office asking for Kudo Shinichi, her apparent boyfriend. Conan, trying to grasp the situation, is watching a soccer game and notices the star player, Akagi Hideo, intentionally missing easy shots. He tells Ryoko that Shinichi will contact her later. Ran and Conan decide to go to Ryoko's apartment and wait for Shinichi. Conan discovers that Akagi Mamoru, Hideo's little brother, has been kidnapped. The kidnapper demands that Hideo lose the game or he will never see Mamoru again. Using a clue from Mamoru's video game, they locate him at the house of Hideo's friend and rival, Uemura Naoki. Naoki reveals he did it as revenge against Hideo who broke his leg during practice, sabotaging his chance to become a star soccer player. He would later regret his actions when Hideo announces on television that he wished Naoki was there because they could have scored more goals together.
11	11	11	"The Piano Sonata "Moonlight" Murders^{1 hr.}" / "The Moonlight Sonata Murder Case (Part 1)"; Transliteration: "Piano Sonata "Gekkō" Satsujin Jiken" (Japanese: ピアノソナタ「月光」殺人事件)	Ikuro Sato Yuji Yamaguchi	N/A	April 8, 1996	June 9, 2004
Kogoro, with Ran and Conan, travels to Tsukikage Island after receiving a cryptic letter and payment in advance from Asoh Keiji, a famous pianist, requesting his services. On the island, they discover that Keiji had been dead for twelve years; legend has it that he murdered his family before locking himself in his estate and playing Beethoven's Moonlight Sonata while the estate burned to the ground. Keiji's piano is located in the community hall, the same location where the previous mayor Kameyama Isamu was found dead and Moonlight Sonata was also heard when he died. During the funeral for Mayor Kameyama Isamu, Kawashima Hideo, the richest man on the island, is found drowned to death; the aforementioned song is heard again. Conan interprets the letter as indicating that the murders are just starting and the others spend the night near the piano along with Dr. Asai Narumi. The assisting officer explains to Conan that Keiji had a son named Seiji, who survived his family's massacre as he was in a Tokyo hospital. More sheet music from Keiji can be found in a safe at the community hall. As the police interrogate everyone who was at the funeral the next day, the second movement of Moonlight Sonata is heard and the current mayor Kuroiwa Tatsuji is found violently murdered in the PA room with a knife plunged into his back.
11	12	12	"The Piano Sonata "Moonlight" Murders^{1 hr.}" / "The Moonlight Sonata Murder Case (Part 2)"; Transliteration: "Piano Sonata "Gekkō" Satsujin Jiken" (Japanese: ピアノソナタ「月光」殺人事件)	Ikuro Sato Yuji Yamaguchi	N/A	April 8, 1996	June 10, 2004
The investigation continues. Murasawa Shuichi is found unconscious, his attacker jumps out the window, and Conan discovers narcotics in a piano's hidden compartment. The paranoid Nishimoto Ken is discovered hanging in a nearby room. Music notes left by the killer reveal that he is avenging Asoh Keiji. With further investigation of Keiji's music sheet, Conan tranquilizes Kogoro, first explaining that Kazuaki knocked out Shuichi, evidenced by the fresh bandage on his arm as he jumped out the window. Next, it is explained that all 3 murders had their times of death falsified to give the killer a perfect alibi. Conan reveals the killer to be Dr. Narumi Asai, who in turn is, unmasked as Keiji's son, Seiji. In Keiji's coded sheet music, the 3 victims, former mayor Kameyama Isamu, plus Keiji, formed a drug smuggling operation and used Keiji's concerts as a front to sell drugs, but Keiji decided to pull out. The other members murdered him and his family to keep their drug scheme a secret, not realizing Keiji had a son named Seiji. As Kogoro (actually Conan) lays down the facts, Narumi/Seiji escapes to the community hall where Keiji's piano is and sets the building ablaze. Conan tries to convince him to escape from the building by showing him Keiji's dying message. Seiji, grateful for Conan's attempt, throws him out the window to safety and then plays Moonlight Sonata as the burning flames close in, just like his father before him.
12	13	13	"Ayumi-chan's Abduction" / "Kidnapped: Amy"; Transliteration: "Ayumi-chan Yūkai Jiken" (Japanese: 歩美ちゃん誘拐事件)	Hirohito Ochi	Junichi Miyashita	April 15, 1996	June 14, 2004
While playing hide-and-seek in the park with the other Detective Boys, Ayumi (Amy) hides herself in the trunk of a car and falls asleep. When she wakes, the car has left the park. Ayumi finds the head of a girl wrapped in newspaper in the trunk with her. Conan uses a new radio transmitter, the Detective Boys Badge, created by Professor Agasa, to gather clues as to where the car is heading. Riding Conan's new turbo engine skateboard, they are able to catch up with Ayumi. They confront the men and Conan kicks a bicycle helmet, knocking out one of the men. The Detective Boys realize that the men are actors and the decapitated girl was a prop. Since the actor was knocked out and the prop damaged the Detective Boys were forced to participate in the play.
13	14	14	"The Bizarre Manhunt Murder" / "Mystery Mastermind"; Transliteration: "Kimyō na Hito Sagashi Satsujin Jiken" (Japanese: 奇妙な人捜し殺人事件)	Johei Matsura	Yuichi Higurashi	April 22, 1996	June 15, 2004
A woman named Hirota Masami shows up at Kogoro's (Richard's) Detective Agency and asks him to find Hirota Kenzo, her father. Rearranging Kenzo's cat's name, they realize it's the name of a racing horse. They find him at a horse track but the next day, Kenzo is found dead and Masami is missing. Conan remembers that he accidentally placed a tracker on Masami but the batteries in his glasses run out. Another detective is discovered who is tracking Kenzo down for his client Hirota Akira. After Conan's glasses are recharged, they head to Masami's location and find Akira dead. Conan realizes that the Hirotas are connected to a billion yen robbery and that a disguised Masami passed them in the hall. Conan follows her and finds her with her boss, Okita. Okita reveals Masami's real name to be Miyano Akemi and that she, along with the two murdered men, stole the money. Okita plans to remove all evidence of his involvement and prepares to shoot her but is knocked out by Conan. Akemi confesses that she left the money at the hotel and thanks Conan for his help.
14	15	15	"The Mysterious Sniper Message Case" / "The Shooter"; Transliteration: "Nazo no Messēji Sogeki Jiken" (Japanese: 謎のメッセージ狙撃事件)	Masato Sato	Kazunari Kochi	April 29, 1996	June 16, 2004
The Junior Detective Boys watch as a sniper shoots a balloon by the river. Later Conan sees the sniper held at gunpoint by two other men. When the Junior Detective League gets there, the gunmen have left; however, Conan finds the numbers 3540405162 on a calculator the sniper left behind. They call the police and find out the sniper, Yamabe Koichi, and his wife, Eri, were recently reported missing. The message is broken when Conan turns the calculator upside down to discover the actual code. The code reveals that Koichi is going to shoot someone on the Shoho train on the 29th at 1:00 pm. Conan and the police manage to track the sniper down and rescue him and his wife. The men holding Koichi hostage were part of the Tiger Dragons gang and wanted to assassinate the prosecutor for arresting their leader.
15	16	16	"The Missing Corpse Murder" / "The Two-Faced Brother"; Transliteration: "Kieta Shitai Satsujin Jiken" (Japanese: 消えた死体殺人事件)	Ikuro Sato	Kuchiru Kazehara	May 13, 1996	June 17, 2004
The Junior Detective Boys search for their classmate Hiroki's cat turns horrid when they find a bloody corpse in the bathroom of a nearby house. The police is summoned but the corpse is gone despite Conan having a vantage over the residence. Tanaka Kazuyoshi, a writer who goes to take a nap, and Tanaka Tomofumi, his younger brother who is coming home from work, arrives minutes of each other and claim that there is no dead body. The police search and only find Kazuyoshi sleeping in his chair. Inspector Megure thinks the kids simply pulled a prank and leaves. Conan returns that night to confirm his theories: Kazuyoshi is actually dead; his corpse was positioned to appear as if he fell asleep in front of the television. It is revealed that after Tomofumi murdered his brother, he disguised himself as HKazuysohi and imitated his voice through an answering machine, effectively convincing the police that Kazuyoshi was alive. Tomofumi confesses how Kazuyoshi threw his writing career away and blackmailed him after catching Tomofumi trading stocks illegally. In a psychotic break, Tomofumi "becomes" his brother and attempts to murder Conan, the entire confession is broadcast through his badge and into the ears of the Inspector. Tomofumi is defeated with an iron kettle to the face. Inspector Megure's faith in the children is restored.
16	17	17	"The Antique Collector Murder" / "A Loan Repaid"; Transliteration: "Kottōhin Korekutā Satsujin Jiken" (Japanese: 骨董品コレクター殺人事件)	Hirohito Ochi	Yasushi Hirano	May 20, 1996	June 21, 2004
Maru Denjiro, an antique collector, asks Kogoro to investigate his wife Maru Ineko's affair while he handles business with three of his clients. When Denjiro doesn't return, a housemaid finds his bloodied corpse pinned to the wall with a katana and the crime scene has been shredded. Clues point to Denjiro's clients: Suwa Yuji and Akutsu Makoto, as well as the family physician, Dr. Hatano Ikuya who is revealed to be Mrs. Maru's lover. Conan notices that scratches on the dresser drawers do not match up; so he photographs the drawer and re-arranges them. He discovers the murderer and through Kogoro, Conan reveals that the drawers spell out the name of the murderer when arranged in their original positions. It spells Suwa in hiragana revealing Suwa Yuji (Jackie Sawyer) as the murderer. Yuji confesses to the crime and explains that Denjiro sold a sword that was a family heirloom that Yuji had put up as collateral on a loan. In a fit of rage, Yuji launches at Kogoro (he doesn't flinch due to being unconscious) but withdraws from attacking. He is arrested while Kogoro, now awake, overreacts after seeing his own blood.
17	18	18	"The Department Store Hijack" / "The Case of the Hi-Jacked Department Store"; Transliteration: "Depāto Jakku Jiken" (Japanese: デパートジャック事件)	Yasuhiro Minami	Junichi Miyashita	May 27, 1996	June 22, 2004
The Junior Detective Boys are accidentally locked inside a department store after hours. They were returning to retrieve Genta's (George's) Yaiba autograph, a fictional super hero. They decide to visit the security room to ask to be released. They find robbers have tied up the two security guards and an elevator girl. The robbers spot the Junior Detective Boys and hunt them down. Finally, the Junior Detective Boys apprehends the robbers. Conan goes to free the guards but on the way discovers that the elevator girl freed herself. He discloses that she is an accomplice and apprehends her. Later, Conan and his friends receive awards for capturing the robbers and do not have to pay for the food they ate and the objects they broke during their stay.
18	19	19	"The June Bride Murder Case" / "Wedding Day Blues"; Transliteration: "Rokugatsu no Hanayome Satsujin Jiken" (Japanese: 6月の花嫁殺人事件)	Johei Matsura	Kazunari Kochi	June 3, 1996	June 23, 2004
Ran (Rachel) and Shinichi's (Jimmy's) old homeroom teacher, Sayuri Matsumoto (Catherine McLaughlin) is getting married but collapses from drinking a poisoned lemon tea before the wedding even starts. Several suspects are caught on video, including Sayuri's father, Kiyonaga Matsumoto (Kristopher McLaughlin) and Takasugi Toshihiko, the groom. Fingerprint analysis show that some prints are missing from the lemon tea can. Conan, through Suzuki Sonoko, identifies Toshihiko as the culprit. Toshihiko discloses that Kiyonaga indirectly caused his mother's death. Sayuri's friend reveals that Sayuri was aware of this past but chose to marry him anyway, because he was her childhood love. A message from the hospital announces Sayuri's surgery to be a success and Toshihiko cries with happiness. Toshihiko is sent to prison and he marries Sayuri three years later.
19	20	20	"The Elevator Murder Case" / "Fashion Sense"; Transliteration: "Erebētā Satsujin Jiken" (Japanese: エレベーター殺人事件)	Masato Sato	Kazunari Kochi	June 10, 1996	June 24, 2004
Ashiya Eiko is seen in her office building after hours walking about, leaving visible footprints behind, then leaves. Meanwhile, Ran is handpicked from thousands of girls to model for Ashiya Eiko's design company. Animosity is felt when Eiko's employee, Taniguchi Mika arrives. They both ride different elevators to their floors, but Eiko states she can not get through to her. Eda, the security guard, takes them to check on Mika, instead they find her stabbed to death in the elevator. Although it appeared to be a robbery attempt turned deadly, Conan is certain that Eiko is guilty; however, he is unable to prove it as Mika's body was found in the elevator on the 8th floor and Eiko was on the 15th floor. With a few more clues, Conan tranquilizes Kogoro, revealing that Eiko left artificial footprints in advance to throw authorities off her trail. Next, she called Mika to the 15th floor and murdered her, then placed her corpse in the elevator with her back leaning on the door and then sent it to the 8th floor. As evidence, Eiko had no time disposing the bloody gloves she used in the murder, so she still has them. Eiko confesses that she murdered Miko in vengeance for stealing her clothing designs and selling them to her rivals.
20	21	21	"The Haunted Mansion Murder" / "The Disappearing Act"; Transliteration: "Yūreiyashiki Satsujin Jiken" (Japanese: 幽霊屋敷殺人事件)	Ikuro Sato	N/A	June 17, 1996	June 28, 2004
Ayumi is walking home when she sees candle lights in an old abandoned house where an unsolved murder occurred five years ago. When she convinces the Junior Detective Boys to sneak in and explore the house, Conan notices food cooking and running water. Mitsuhiko and Genta are captured when they wander off by themselves. Conan and Ayumi follow an old woman down some hidden stairs and find a caged man named Akio. Conan's postulates that Akio is the son of the murdered man and is being held against his will by his mother who refuses to let him confess to the police. When the woman prepares to kill Conan, Akio confesses that he did murder his father due to his harsh judgment when Akio failed an important test for the third time; his mother, after discovering the crime, fixed the scene to make it look like a robbery-murder and locked her son in a basement cage. Conan persuades the woman to let Abraham turns himself in and she follows suit. Mitsuhiko and Genta are found sleeping outside. The children are then scolded by their parents and Ran at the police station for sneaking out after dark. Later, the Junior Detective Boys decide to investigate another haunted house which actually belongs to Shinichi.
21	22	22	"The TV Drama Murder Case" / "Lights, Camera... Murder"; Transliteration: "TV Dorama Roke Satsujin Jiken" (Japanese: TVドラマロケ殺人事件)	Hirohito Ochi	Hirohito Ochi	June 24, 1996	June 29, 2004
Okino Yoko is starring in a television drama and invites Kogoro, Ran, and Conan to watch the filming. They meet the TV cast: Nachi Shingo, Anzai Morio, Gondo Taketoshi, Mamegaki Taeko, Taeko's grandfather Kyusaku Mamegaki and Taeko's fiancé Shimazaki Yuji respectively. Later that night after production is done, Anzai Morio is found stabbed to death; his dying message in katakana spells "Komainu" (or Shrine God in the dub). Inspector Megure is called alongside Detective Takagi. Conan observes that some of the words are dry while others are wet. The dry strokes spell out "Nimaime" (Nachi Shingo), the name of one of the actors. Shingo confesses that he changed the message, but only to avoid suspicion. Conan further realizes that the name was altered before Shingo changed it. The real name is written under his. Kogoro is tranquilized and Conan reveals that Taeko killed Morio, who wrote her name. When her husband, Yuji, spotted the message while searching for her, he disguised himself as Morio and threw off his real time of death and changed Morio's message to frame Shingo. Taeko confesses, stating Morio had been blackmailing her. Back in the day, Taeko ran with Morio and his bandits. She told them about her grandfather's shrine, which they robbed, and the shrine's supervisor Sugiyama committed suicide.
22	23	23	"The Luxury Liner Murders (Part 1)" / "Smooth Sailing (Part 1)"; Transliteration: "Gōka Kyakusen Renzoku Satsujin Jiken (Zenpen)" (Japanese: 豪華客船連続殺人事件（前編）)	Ko Matsuzono	N/A	July 1, 1996	June 30, 2004
Kogoro, Ran, and Conan miss the boat home after a vacation and accept a ride with the rich Hatamoto family (consisting of the clan head Hatamoto Gozo, his granddaughter Hatamoto Natsue, Natsue's husband Hatamoto Takeshi, Natsue's sister Hatamoto Akie, Akie's husband Hatamoto Tatsuo, his 2nd son Hatamoto Joji, his grandson Hatamoto Ichiro, his eldest daughter Hatamoto Mariko, Mariko's husband Hatamoto Kitaro, and the family butler Suzuki Kenji) on their private ship. Gozo, the head of the family, humiliates Ichiro while he is sketching, then requests Takashi to meet him in private. It is revealed that Takashi is actually the son of Edward Zimmers, a man Gozo put out of business. Later that night, Gozo is murdered and a bread crumb is found in a pool of his blood. Takashi, the only one with a motive, is locked in a cabin. Everyone in the family, with interest in the Hatamoto inheritance, is shocked to find out that Natsue will inherit everything as requested in Gozo's will. An enraged Tatsuo leaves but is found brutally murdered and Takashi is missing from the storage room. Kogoro concludes that Takashi has escaped to continue his killing spree.
23	24	24	"The Luxury Liner Murders (Part 2)" / "Smooth Sailing (Part 2)"; Transliteration: "Gōka Kyakusen Renzoku Satsujin Jiken (Kōhen)" (Japanese: 豪華客船連続殺人事件（後編）)	Toshiya Shinohara	N/A	July 8, 1996	July 1, 2004
Conan finds Gozo's crime scene strange and believes Takashi is being framed. The boat suddenly loses power and Ichiro, Gozo's grandson, is stabbed in the dark. After talking with the butler Kenji and searching the rooms for Takashi, Conan puts Kogoro to sleep. In both Gozo and Tatsuo's murders, the killer attempted to frame Takashi; first by leaving his flower near Gozo's crime scene, then unlocking the storage room allowing Takashi to escape after killing Tatsuo as he witnessed the suspect toss the first weapon into the sea. As for Ichiro, he never mentioned his attacker using a flashlight when he was attacked in the bathroom, prompting Conan to declare that not only did he stab himself, but he is also, in fact, Gozo and Tatsuo's killer. As evidence, Ichiro is an artist and carrying bread is common as it can be used as an eraser; he unintentionally dropped a bread crumb in a pool of Gozo's blood. Ichiro confesses; he is in love with his cousin Natsue, but Gozo rejected his proposal for marriage with her and humiliated him. Takashi tells Natsue he did indeed plan to avenge his father but ending up falling in love with her instead; he accepted a much better future with her over petty revenge.
24	25	25	"The Case of the Mysterious Woman with Amnesia" / "Better Off Forgotten"; Transliteration: "Nazo no Bijo Kioku Sōshitsu Jiken" (Japanese: 謎の美女記憶喪失事件)	Johei Matsura	Junichi Miyashita	July 15, 1996	July 5, 2004
Kogoro reads the newspaper and discovers that Yuda Hitoshi, a criminal he convicted, has escaped from prison. The next day at the horse track, a woman falls into Kogoro's arms, prompting him to take her to get help. Tachibana Maya, the woman, is diagnosed with amnesia. When she is released from the hospital, a bearded man driving a car attempts to hit Maya, followed by debris nearly falling on top of her. Conan suspects that someone is trying to murder her and notes Maya's strange behavior after each incident. Conan then realizes that the bearded man is Yuda Hitoshi donning a disguise. Hitoshi and Maya are revealed to be working together. He hired Maya, who is actually a professional assassin, and her mission is to kill Kogoro. Earlier before Maya could do so, she was involved in a car accident which explains her memory loss. Maya was never a target and Hitoshi tried to kill Kogoro himself, but his failed attempts helped Maya regain her memory. Maya leads Kogoro to an abandoned warehouse and she attempts to hang him with a wire but Conan manages to stop her. Hitoshi is, again, arrested by the police, along with Maya.
25	26	26	"The Fake Ransom Case" / "The Counterfeit Ransom Kidnapping"; Transliteration: "Itsuwari no Mino Shiro Kin Yūkai Jiken" (Japanese: 偽りの身代金誘拐事件)	Masato Sato	Yuichi Higurashi	July 22, 1996	July 6, 2004
Takei Naoko, daughter of businessman Takei Katsuhiko, is held hostage by a kidnapper demanding $5 million. When authorities approach the kidnapper, the van drives off a cliff and into the river, leaving both dead. Conan later befriends a woman named Hanai Akiko. He overhears a conversation between her and her boss, Katsuhiko. After finding scuba gear, Conan is delighted to know that Naoko may still be alive. While away, Akiko calls Katsuhiko and tells him that Naoko is still alive and to come alone and bring $5 million cash to the same warehouse. When Katsuhiko goes to the warehouse, he is shocked when Akiko reveals herself as the kidnapper. Naoko was never kidnapped or in harm; Akiko was the kidnapper and victim. Akiko explains that when Katsuhiko drove her father's company into bankruptcy, her father murdered her mother and brother Hanai Masahito, before killing himself. The money that Katsuhiko brought is counterfeit, enraging Akiko, who proceeds to try and murder Katsuhiko by burning him alive. Conan, having hid in the car's trunk, persuades Akiko to spare Katsuhiko or she will cause Naoko to suffer the way she has. Naoko is found and she hugs Akiko for the last time as she is arrested.
26	27^{A}	27	"John the Dog's Murder Case" / "Jack Attacks!"; Transliteration: "Aiken Jon Satsujin Jiken" (Japanese: 愛犬ジョン殺人事件)	Hirohito Ochi	Kazunari Kochi	July 29, 1996	July 7, 2004
Conan is coming back from a restaurant with Ran and Kogoro when they hear a man scream from a nearby house. Once inside, they learn from Sugita Sanae that Maehara Takeshi has been killed in an unprovoked attack by a dog named John. Sakaguchi Masayoshi, John's owner, falls under suspicion as it is believed he trained him to murder. It is revealed that Takeshi bullied Sakaguchi Masato, Masayoshi's son, who committed suicide several years ago as a result of it. Inspector Megure informs everyone that John is in danger of being put down. Sanae explains that Masayoshi called a couple minutes before 9:00 to talk to John and Takashi put the phone to John's ear. Conan drops hints for Kogoro, allowing him to solve the crime. Kogoro concludes that John was trained to kill when he hears nine chimes from a Longcase clock and Masayoshi's voice. Masayoshi confesses that he had forgiven Takashi for Masato's death at the funeral, however, several years later, Takashi resorted to being a heartless bully again and Masayoshi devised a plan to murder him. John is spared and placed with one of Masayoshi's relatives in the country.
27	28^{A}	28	"Kogoro's Reunion Murder Case (Part 1)" / "Richard's Class Reunion (Part 1)"; Transliteration: "Kogoro no Dōsōkai Satsujin Jiken (Zenpen)" (Japanese: 小五郎の同窓会殺人事件（前編）)	Ko Matsuzono	Hiroshi Kashiwabara	August 5, 1996	July 8, 2004
After stopping an armed robbery, Kogoro encounters his friend Horikoshi Yumi in the crowd. Yumi mentions to Kogoro that the Judo class reunion was going to take place later that day and she leaves. When the police takes the criminal away, they ask Kogoro for his dropped weapon, but is unnerved to discover it missing. At the reunion that evening, the Judo club (consisting of Ayashiro Yukio, his wife Ayashiro Noriko, Omura Jun, police detective Nakamichi Kazushi, and Horikoshi Yumi) play table tennis, they then plan to go out and watch the fireworks. Yumi stays behind to take a nap. Kogoro, Ran, and Conan are the only ones who attend the fireworks. At dinner, the Judo club members decide to wake Yumi up from her nap; instead they find her dead from an apparent self-inflicted gunshot wound to her temple. Kogoro and Kazushi are horrified to discover no burn marks on Yumi's wound, meaning she was murdered.
28	29^{A}	29	"Kogoro's Reunion Murder Case (Part 2)" / "Richard's Class Reunion (Part 2)"; Transliteration: "Kogoro no Dōsōkai Satsujin Jiken (Kōhen)" (Japanese: 小五郎の同窓会殺人事件（後編）)	Kazuo Nogami	Hiroshi Kashiwabara	August 12, 1996	July 12, 2004
Conan identifies two things strange facts about Yumi's body; the finger was not on the trigger and she was naked under her robe. Conan, after hearing about the legendary Benkei, realizes who the murderer is and plans to tranquilize Kogoro in order to solve the case. Conan instead decides to drop subtle hints and let him do it himself. Kogoro gets to the bottom of the situation, identifying Yumi's killer as police detective Nakamichi Kazushi, further explaining how Yumi died later than originally estimated, exercise from table tennis caused her body to undergo rigor mortis much earlier. He changed Yumi's clothes and wiped the sweat from her body so authorities wouldn't question her activities prior to death, and it was a statement that Kazushi made suggesting he knew Yumi was already dead before the others that seals his fate. Kazushi confesses that he has dated Yumi for 18 years and he proposed to her multiple times but was always turned down. Yumi terrorized Kazushi and a woman he became engaged to later on. When the Judo members question Kazushi on his actions, he attacks them but is slammed down by Kogoro, who leaves him for the police to find.

== Notes ==
- ^Jp. The episode's numbering as followed in Japan
- ^Eng. The episode's numbering as followed by Funimation Entertainment
- ^1 hr. The episodes were aired as a single hour long episode in Japan
- ^A These episodes are part of the second season of Case Closed
