= Case Closed season 4 =

Season of television series

Case Closed
- Season 4
- The cover of the DVD compilation released by Funimation of the fourth season
- No. of episodes: 24 (Japanese); 27 (English)

Release
- Original network: NNS (ytv)
- Original release: December 1, 1997 – June 22, 1998

Season chronology
- ← Previous; Season 3 Next → Season 5

The fourth season of the Case Closed anime was directed by Kenji Kodama and produced by TMS-Kyokuichi and Yomiuri Telecasting Corporation. The series is based on Gosho Aoyama's Case Closed manga series. In Japan, the series is titled Detective Conan (名探偵コナン, Meitantei Conan) but was changed due to legal issues with the title Detective Conan. The episodes' plot continues Jimmy Kudo's life as a young child named Conan Edogawa.

The episodes use six pieces of theme music: two opening theme and two closing themes in the Japanese episodes and one opening theme and one ending theme in the English adaption. The first Japanese opening theme is "Nazo" (謎, "Mystery") by Miho Komatsu up to episode ninety-six. The second opening theme is "Unmei no Roulette Mawashite" (運命のルーレット廻して, lit. Spinning the Roulette of Destiny) by Zard is for the rest of the season. The first ending theme is "Kimi ga inai Natsu" (君がいない夏, "Summer Without You") by Deen for the first episode of the season. The second is "Negai Goto Hitotsu Dake" (願い事ひとつだけ, lit. Only One Wish) by Miho Komatsu for the rest of the season. The English opening is Mystery, "Nazo" with English lyrics sung by Stephanie Naldony until episode 102. The second opening is, "Unmei no Roulette Mawashite" by Zard, is used onwards. The first English ending theme is "Summer Without You" with lyrics by Carl Finch until episode eighty-seven. The second English ending is "Negai Goto Hitotsu Dake" by Miho Komatsu onwards.

The season initially ran from December 1, 1997, through June 22, 1998, on Nippon Television Network System in Japan. Episodes eighty-six to one hundred-six were later collected into seven DVD compilations by Shogakukan and were all released on March 24, 2006. The season was later licensed and dubbed by Funimation Entertainment and released in a DVD box set containing episodes eighty to one hundred-five, seventy-seven to ninety-nine in the Japanese numbering. The Viridian edition of the season was released on March 23, 2010.

== Episode listing ==
Orig.^{Jp.}	Funi.^{Eng.}	No. in season	Crunchyroll translated title/Funimation title Original Japanese title	Directed by	Written by	Original release date
83	86	1	"The General Hospital Murder Case" / "The Set Up"; Transliteration: "Sōgōbyōin Satsujin Jiken" (Japanese: 総合病院殺人事件)	Johei Matsura	Junichi Miyashita	December 1, 1997
While in a hospital for a knee injury, Richard witnesses a murder. Dr. Charles Yanning, Richard's doctor, dismisses his claims as hallucinations from his medication. On the fourth incident, Dr. Bill Hindman, another doctor, has been stabbed to death, supposedly by Richard. Conan discovers that Richard fell prey to a light trick and Dr. Yanning is believed to be the killer, but he has the alibi of talking to Nurse Nolan in another room at the time of the murder. Conan, after finding various inconsistencies in Yanning's story, tranquilizes Richard and reveals that Dr. Yanning used a CPR dummy and light trick to make Richard believe he was going insane. He killed Bill, used his corpse to recreate the murder on the fourth time, bashed Richard on the head and closed his hand around the knife, then used his answering machine to hold a conversation with Nurse Nolan as he was going back to his office. As evidence, Dr. Yanning's fingerprints were not on his cup, but Nolan's was, as opposed to him saying he was in his office drinking coffee. Dr. Yanning confesses saying Bill was blackmailing him to drop out of the running for head surgeon and is arrested.
84	87	2	"The Ski Lodge Murder Case (Part 1)" / "Massacre Night (Part 1)"; Transliteration: "Sukii Rojji Satsujin Jiken (Zenpen)" (Japanese: スキーロッジ殺人事件（前編）)	Kazuo Nogami	N/A	December 8, 1997
While on a ski trip Rachel, Serena, and Conan meet their old elementary teachers: Anne Preston, Shelley Tilton, Paul Keen, and Brent Shore, and are invited to her villa. Once there, they meet Drake Ziegman, a creepy news journalist who claims a series of murders will occur and as true to the man's word, Serena finds Ms. Preston unconscious and is attacked herself; they both survive their ordeal. Later, Larry Sullivan, the man who allegedly planned the trip, is found dead outside, his frozen corpse laid against the doorbell. Terrified, Paul runs into his room and locks himself inside, believing he will be murdered next. Conan has Dr. Agasa do research, where he finds that a student named Moreen Manahan had committed suicide 3 years prior; the remaining suspects were once her teachers at one point in time. Before Conan can piece anything together, Ms. Tilton is heard screaming in horror.
85	88	3	"The Ski Lodge Murder Case (Part 2)" / "Massacre Night (Part 2)"; Transliteration: "Sukii Rojji Satsujin Jiken (Kōhen)" (Japanese: スキーロッジ殺人事件（後編）)	Kazuo Nogami	N/A	December 15, 1997
Paul Keen is found strangled to death. Conan finds a strain of hair, bloody scratch marks around his neck, and fishing line outside around the pillows and realizes how the murders were done. Rachel, under Conan's guidance, reveals that Larry was murdered well before anyone arrived and his corpse was tilted in front of the door with fishing line and a rubber band that snapped due to the cold air allowing his body to fall forward. Mr. Keen was murdered shortly afterwards with the killer taking the weapon with them: Anne Preston is revealed to be the killer; she faked her own attack (using Larry's frozen corpse) then made an attempt on Serena's life. As evidence, Anne's hair is actually a wig. She braided it, turning it into the perfect murder weapon and it yields blood belonging to Paul Keen. Anne confesses stating her motive as revenge for Moreen, who she believes was killed and her death staged as a suicide after she told her that Larry and an unnamed accomplice used her influence to get students into their school illegally. She is revealed to have invited everyone to the villa to find Larry's accomplice, who was revealed to be Paul, whose erratic behavior gave him away. Rachel, beyond devastated that her teacher is a murderer, breaks down crying on Conan shortly afterwards.
86	89	4	"The Kidnap Locating Case" / "Find the Kidnap Site"; Transliteration: "Yūkai Genba Tokutei Jiken" (Japanese: 誘拐現場特定事件)	Yoshio Suzuki	Shunsuke Ozawa	January 12, 1998
Mitch brings a wideband receiver to school and the Detective Boys pick up a terrifying phone call by a kidnapper. Using the sounds heard in the background and the conversation as clues, Conan is able to narrow the location of the kidnapper to an area around a railroad, a high school, and a construction site. The kidnapper demands the victim's father to commit suicide and the victim yells out the final clue indicating that she's near a tire factory. Conan is able to apprehend the kidnapper just in time.
87	90	5	"The Crane That Returned a Favor Murder Case" / "For the Birds"; Transliteration: "Tsuru no Ongaeshi Satsujin Jiken" (Japanese: 鶴の恩返し殺人事件)	Yasuichiro Yamamoto	Takeo Ohno	January 19, 1998
A trip to Hokkaidō to see red-crowned cranes ends tragically when the birds' caretaker, Shane Mathison, is found dead with an arrow in his chest. Chad, Shane's son, is the most suspicious when he suddenly left before the crime was discovered, and Lindsey and Tom, Shane's daughter and brother, are suspects. Conan finds a block of wood in the fireplace, a turtle dove nest on top of the chimney, broken glass in a straight line, and a hurricane window with a scratch on it. The old man's son confesses that he's the murderer, but Conan proves that he's not. Richard is put to sleep and Conan reveals Shane's brother, Tom, to be the killer who set up a spring-loaded crossbow and fired it at the same time as the son.
88	91	6	"The Dracula Manor Murder Case (Part 1)" / "Vampire Villa (Part 1)"; Transliteration: "Dorakyura-sō Satsujin Jiken (Zenpen)" (Japanese: ドラキュラ荘殺人事件（前編）)	Hirohito Ochi	Hirohito Ochi	January 26, 1998
Stefan Van Croven, a famous horror novelist, requests Richard, believing his wife is having an affair. At Van Croven's villa, Richard meets his student Jonathan Tradonio, his wife Daiselle, magazine editor Foster Drake, and a researcher named Shamus O'Halliwell. Richard encounters Stefan himself eerily dressed as a vampire and is offered to stay the night because of a snowstorm. Stefan excuses himself to his study and asks Jonathan to bring him wine and a movie to watch. At midnight, everyone checks on Stefan but find him tied to a wooden cross with a stake impaled through his heart; a movie projector lightens his corpse up and the stake used in the murder had been stolen. Richard is forced to examine the body due to authorities being of no help with the snowstorm in progress. Everyone had a motive to see Stefan dead and Daiselle confesses to her affair with Shamus, putting the two at the top of the suspect list. As Richard prepares to close the case, he and Conan are horrified to discover no footprints in the snow on top of the connecting corridor; with the victim's study door locked, access to Stefan is impossible.
89	92	7	"The Dracula Manor Murder Case (Part 2)" / "Vampire Villa (Part 2)"; Transliteration: "Dorakyura-sō Satsujin Jiken (Kōhen)" (Japanese: ドラキュラ荘殺人事件（後編）)	Hirohito Ochi	Hirohito Ochi	February 2, 1998
Richard reviews the events that took place before Stefan's murder. Conan finds a ladder in a closet and cellophane tape stuck to the curtain rack to discover the truth behind the case. Conan stuns Richard to reveal that the killer stole the stake from the memorabilia room by using a ladder as a bridge, a fruit cutter, and rigging the window in advance with a twig. There was no need to walk across the rooftop of the connecting corridor; the killer simply walked down it after obtaining the weapon, murdered Stefan, then used the film projector to lock the door behind them. The killer is revealed to be Jonathan Tradonio. He locked the study door using cellophane tape attached to the knob, over the railing, and when the projector pulls the tape, locks it. Jonathan claimed to hear the projector running before the body was discovered, yet the study door is soundproof; he already knew it was on. Jonathan confesses how Stefan ordered doctors to keep his sick sister Joella's condition stable, which worsen overtime and killed her. Later, Richard says his next client as a thing for Frankenstein.
90	93	8	"The Flower Scent Murder Case" / "Deadly Art"; Transliteration: "Hana no Kaori Satsujin Jiken" (Japanese: 花の香り殺人事件)	Johei Matsura	Yuichi Higurashi	February 9, 1998
Richard is invited to Rita Jordan's ikebana award ceremony to investigate a threat letter announcing a murder at a luxurious hotel. Rita brushes the letter off as jealousy, but the threat soon comes true when Ty Sherwood, the hotel owner, is strangled to death. During the investigation, Conan reveals chloroform vapors released from Sherwood's flower rendered him unconscious and was killed. Also found in Rika's dressing room is cyanide. Due to Rita's uncaring behavior, Conan suspects her to be the killer and worries she may kill again. He gets to the bottom of the situation, hurries to the stage where Rika is performing, and sprays all the flowers with liquid nitrogen, which are laced with cyanide. With Richard stunned, Conan reveals that the killer's next target was Rita Jordan herself, and Madison, Rika's manager, to be the culprit who also made a suicidal attempt. Madison explains that the ikebana technique Rita became famous for was her sister's and Rita was a student learning the ropes. Rita stole her sister's technique, got the funding for it, and passed it off as her own, and Madison's sister committed suicide. With the truth exposed, Rita is left a broken woman and Richard, now awake, spanks Conan for "ruining the show."
91	94	9	"The Robber Hospitalization Case" / "Hospital Homicide"; Transliteration: "Gōtō Hannin Nyuuin Jiken" (Japanese: 強盗犯人入院事件)	Yasuichiro Yamamoto	Shunsuke Ozawa	February 16, 1998
Richard breaks his leg and is admitted to the hospital. Conan and the Detective Boys visit him after school where they meet Yoshio and Richard hospital roommates. In the room's conversation, it is revealed that Yoshio was working at the bank at the time of a 100 million yen heist and the criminals is still at large. Conan confronts Yoshio and tells him he knows the bank criminals are forcing him to kill their apprehended partner and his daughter is held hostage. Conan grabs the gun which Yoshio is holding and knocks out the criminals with his soccer ball. The Detective Boys rush in to save Yoshio's daughter who is held on top of a building across from the hospital.
92	95	10	"The Traverse of Terror Murder Case (Part 1)" / "Mountain Fox (Part 1)"; Transliteration: "Kyōfu no Toravaasu Satsujin Jiken (Zenpen)" (Japanese: 恐怖のトラヴァース殺人事件（前編）)	Kazuo Nogami	Junichi Miyashita	February 23, 1998
In the opening moments, The Fox, regarded as the best assassin in Japan, murders a bank president and indirectly kills a little girl onboard a school bus. Meanwhile, Bruno Ushton, a real estate company president, has mistaken an ulcer for cancer and paid The Fox to assassinate him during a traversing trip. Realizing his mistake, Bruno asks Richard to find him because he lost contact and is unable to stop the assassination. Richard, Rachel, and Conan head to Tanbara Mountain where they meet Sarah, her husband Jared, Adam Duke, the Frenchman Sebastian LeClaire, and Garrett Burke, serving as the guide. Along the way up, Garret is murdered; his corpse is left to preserve evidence. The group stays in a cabin, ran by Jericho, on top of the mountain. The group hears of the murder of a man and his money stolen over the radio, and police are searching for a couple; Jared and Sarah deny involvement. Richard is attacked and Sebastian is missing. They find him in a cave and Conan deduces he's claustrophobic. When they head back to the cabin, Rachel's scream is heard.
93	96	11	"The Traverse of Terror Murder Case (Part 2)" / "Mountain Fox (Part 2)"; Transliteration: "Kyōfu no Toravaasu Satsujin Jiken (Kōhen)" (Japanese: 恐怖のトラヴァース殺人事件（後編）)	Yoshio Suzuki	Junichi Miyashita	March 2, 1998
Richard and Conan rush back to the mountain cabin, due to Rachel's scream, to find Sarah stabbed to death. They deduce that the killer is her husband Jared. Bloodstained money is found in his backpack and they discover him gone along with the cabin's caretaker, Jericho. Richard saves Jared from a landslide and ties him up, but the Fox is still out there. Jared confesses saying Sarah wanted to turn herself in after learning Richard was among their group believing he was tracking them down for their previous crime. Conan is horrified to discover the phone lines have been cut and concludes Fox is disguised as the now missing caretaker. The Fox murdered Garret because he and Jericho know each other and posed as a threat to his job. Conan rushes into the forest after a gunshot is heard. Bruno is revealed to have fabricated his sickness and has no plans of dying; all of this was just a rouse to draw the Fox closer so he could take revenge after one of Fox's assassination jobs led to the death of his daughter. Conan reminds him of his daughter and Bruno lowers his gun while the Fox, after trying to make a run for it, is brought down by Richard. The real Jericho is found, Garrett and Sarah's bodies are recovered, Bruno is taken in for questioning, and the Fox is arrested.
94	97	12	"The Snow Woman Legend Murder Case" / "The Other Girl"; Transliteration: "Yuki-onna Densetsu Satsujin Jiken" (Japanese: 雪女伝説殺人事件)	Johei Matsura	Takeo Ohno	March 9, 1998
Richard, Rachel, and Conan are in Miyagi Prefecture at an inn ran by Kathleen and Grayson Neighbors where they meet actress Adele Kaiser, known for her role as the Snow Priestess and her stunt double, Yvette Ainsworth. Later that night, Rachel catches a glimpse of a Yukionna outside and Adele apparently gives them a bottle of w and returns to bed. Yvette discovers her missing after finding a suicide note, prompting the group to search for her. The authorities find Adele dead in the snow. Conan finds footprints on a tree and a delivery doll in the inn, then tranquilizes Richard that Adele was murdered and reveals Yvette to be the killer. Adele was drugged when she went skiing, buried in the snow, and died of hypothermia. The Yukionna that Rachel saw was actually Yvette on two occasions, who went to put Adele in the Yukionna kimono and impersonated her, voice and body, to make it appear that Adele was going to commit suicide. The location of the murder made it easy for Yvette to play two people at once. As evidence, Adele's fingerprints are not on the bottle of whiskey as opposed to Yvette saying Adele handed it to her. It was the karamori doll. Yvette confesses, saying she was living in Adele's shadow and her hard work was constantly overlooked.
95	98	13	"Kogoro's Date Murder Case" / "Richard's Deadly Date"; Transliteration: "Kogorō no Deeto Satsujin Jiken" (Japanese: 小五郎のデート殺人事件)	Hirohito Ochi	Kazunari Kochi	March 16, 1998
Richard heads home on a scheduled 7:30 train where he falls asleep but wakes up just in time to get off at the right stop. He encounters a friend, Sonia Shadowly, while walking home and the two go to Tōto Bay Bridge. Richard finds a harmless pen in Sonia's car and keeps it for himself. They return two hours later to find Sonia's roommate, Vicky Bowen, stabbed to death in her condo. Conan suspects Sonia and suggests that Richard missed his stop on the train and got off at 8:30 instead, breaking Sonia's alibi. Angry that he was used for criminal purposes, Richard heads to confront Sonia at her residence but knocks himself out on a table. Conan uses the chance to impersonate him and reveal that Sonia is indeed the murderer. When Vicki was still alive, a mail courier visited her to sign for a package that was dropped off at 8:00. Vicki kept the pen and moments later, Sonia came and stabbed her to death, the ballpoint pen falling beside her. Believing the pen was Vicki's, Sonia took it to dispose later, unbeknownst to her that the mail courier's fingerprints was on the pen, which is now in Richard's possession. Sonia confesses and states that Vicki was blackmailing her over a product that is forbidden to sale in Japan.
96	99	14	"The Great Detective is Cornered! Two Big Murder Cases in a Row^{2 hrs.}" / "Jimmy Kudo Revealed (Part 1)"; Transliteration: "Oitsumerareta Meitantei! Renzoku Nidai Satsujin Jiken" (Japanese: 追いつめられた名探偵!連続2大殺人事件)	Yasuichiro Yamamoto Keitaro Motonaga	N/A	March 23, 1998
Conan returns from Agasa's and fall asleep. Rachel returns home and removes his glasses discovering his striking resemblance to Jimmy. Richard is hired by Nina Tathers to investigate the death of her husband, Carl Tathers, a famous magician. She explains the police have concluded it to be suicide by ingesting poison but there are doubts due to finding two cards glued together at the scene. They are invited to the mansion to investigate the crime scene. As they investigate, Conan notices in Carl's picture collection of his students, that the picture of Atrimus Plomtholyd is dustless. Nina reveals Artrimus to be Carl's favorite student who died in an accident fourteen years ago. Conan points out that Carl died with his hands behind his back, a strange posture for someone who died from poisoning, and concludes he was tied up and the murderer must be one of Carl's three students; This was missed due to the police mistaking the rope marks for rings marks. As they investigate, Conan notices that the cards resemble the picture of the redial button on the phone which dials the number 126871*32489*13548*1397.
96	100	15	"The Great Detective is Cornered! Two Big Murder Cases in a Row^{2 hrs.}" / "Jimmy Kudo Revealed (Part 2)"; Transliteration: "Oitsumerareta Meitantei! Renzoku Nidai Satsujin Jiken" (Japanese: 追いつめられた名探偵!連続2大殺人事件)	Yasuichiro Yamamoto Keitaro Motonaga	N/A	March 23, 1998
Conan discerns the phone numbers reveal the shape of a letter or alphabet; The message is deciphered to be the letters DC and the Katakanas マ (ma) and コ (ko). Richard reads the Katakana as the letters MAR and deduces that Carl's student, Marvella Asundi is the killer. Rachel reveals DC must mean da capo causing Conan and Richard to realize Marvella plans to kill Carl and Nina's daughter Anya. Marvella appears with Anya, explaining she can't kill an innocent child. She explains her motive for killing Carl was to avenge her brother's murder who died due to Carl sabotaging Artimus's handcuffs. She later turns herself in to the police. On the way home, Rachel takes Conan to Jimmy's house and confronts him, certain his true identity is Jimmy. Jimmy's mother, Vivian, coincidentally arrives and covers for Conan by sayingh Conan is a distant relative and has been trained by Jimmy. The next day, Vivian takes Conan to investigate the identity of her uncle named Yorkham Xanderbilt by the request of her friend, Hiedy Xanderbilt. Hiedy, and her relatives, suspect Yorkam is impersonating their uncle to get a share of the inheritance left by their father, Cornileus Xanderbilt. A scar on Yorkham's leg ascertains his identity. Yorkham reveals that one of the relatives sent him a threatening letter against his life if he returns to claim the inheritance reveals the man accompanying him is Carlos, a Brazilian bodyguard.
96	101	16	"The Great Detective is Cornered! Two Big Murder Cases in a Row^{2 hrs.}" / "Jimmy Kudo Revealed (Part 3)"; Transliteration: "Oitsumerareta Meitantei! Renzoku Nidai Satsujin Jiken" (Japanese: 追いつめられた名探偵!連続2大殺人事件)	Yasuichiro Yamamoto Keitaro Motonaga	N/A	March 23, 1998
After affirming Yorkham's identity through his writing which matches an old letter, Conan notices a man in a trench-coat hiding around the mansion. That night, Hiedy's step mother is found dead in a water well holding a camellia in her right hand; It was the same way Hiedy's biological mother died. The police are called to investigate while Conan attempts to discern who the murderer is. The police find the step mother's car in the forest with the key in the emission and a cassette tape missing. The next day, during the hearing of the will, an arrow is fired from a timed crossbow directed at Yorkham who manages to avoid it.
96	102	17	"The Great Detective is Cornered! Two Big Murder Cases in a Row^{2 hrs.}" / "Jimmy Kudo Revealed (Part 4)"; Transliteration: "Oitsumerareta Meitantei! Renzoku Nidai Satsujin Jiken" (Japanese: 追いつめられた名探偵!連続2大殺人事件)	Yasuichiro Yamamoto Keitaro Motonaga	N/A	March 23, 1998
A police officer reveals that he found a cassette tape near the bathroom and that the fingerprints on the knife reveal that the step mother was holding the knife outwards. They discover the cassette contained the sounds of a party giving Conan an epiphany. Conan tranquilizes Detective Magnum and reveals that Kari Xanderbilt was the one who prepared the crossbow, evidenced by her statement which reveals she knew an arrow was shot from a cabinet. Kari confesses she's in heavy debt. Conan then reveals the step mother used the cassette to forge an alibi to make it seem as if she was at the party, and had planned to murder Yorkham to increase her share of the inheritance. The camellia flower was to link the crime to their biological mother's death to add to the confusion. Yorkham, skilled in Brazilian Jiu-Jitsu, deflects the knife and killed her unintentionally in self defense. Conan deduces that Yorkham had received two threats, one from Kari and one from the step mother, and had placed the body in the well as a warning to the second killer. The disguised man then enters the room revealing himself to be Jimmy's father, Booker, who reveals Yorkham placed the body there so it could be found to test the Detective's skills. Yorkham, who realized Magnum was an idiot, kept it a secret about what had happened and the two threats. Booker then reveals Yorkham is a double, and bodyguard for Carlos who is the son of the real Yorkham. He further elaborates explaining the double wrote for the real Yorkham since he lost his left hand, evidenced by letters Booker found in the storage room. Later, Booker and Vivian return Conan to the Moore's resident before returning home.
97	103	18	"The Farewell Wine Murder Case"; Transliteration: "Wakare no Wain Satsujin Jiken" (Japanese: 別れのワイン殺人事件)	Yasuichiro Yamamoto	Yuichi Higurashi	April 13, 1998
Sterling Alexander, president of Alexander Industries, requests Richard's help to watch after his two daughters, Autumn and Summer, as he is about to die of a disease diagnosed by his personal physician, Dr. Preston. At Sterling's manor, Conan witnesses Autumn poisoning a bottle of wine and is chloroformed, later deduced by Sterling himself, who, in turn, dies after consuming the wine anyway. Autumn is arrested, though Conan remains unsatisfied and finds a hidden camera and wine in a decorative plant, then knocks Richard out to explain that Sterling concocted a plan to see if his daughters would try to kill him; he never drank the wine but was still killed. The doctor is revealed to be the real killer who diagnosed him with a fake disease then used Sterling's plan against Sterling and injected him with a lethal dose. The entire incident is caught on camera. Dr. Preston confesses, stating Sterling drove his father, who was his business partner, into bankruptcy, the latter killed himself because of it and his sick mother died shortly afterwards. Dr. Preston is arrested for murder.
98	104	19	"The Famous Potter Murder Case (Part 1)" / "Potter's Gambit (Part 1)"; Transliteration: "Meitōgeika Satsujin Jiken (Zenpen)" (Japanese: 名陶芸家殺人事件（前編）)	Kazuo Nogami	Kazunari Kochi	April 20, 1998
Stygas Walfulcot, better known as the Forgemaster, invites Richard, Rachel, and Conan over to his home for the weekend. They meet Stygas's students: Artie Stonewall, Sammy Hammerstoltz, Otto, and Stygas's daughter-in-law, Margery, who accidentally breaks his latest creation. All is forgiven at a party and early the next morning, Margery has disappeared but unfortunately is found hanging in the storeroom. Conan suspects foul play after noticing the floor dirty but Margery's feet clean and convinces Inspector Meguire to think the same, believing the murderer to be within reach.
99	105	20	"The Famous Potter Murder Case (Part 2)" / "Potter's Gambit (Part 2)"; Transliteration: "Meitōgeika Satsujin Jiken (Kōhen)" (Japanese: 名陶芸家殺人事件（後編）)	Yoshio Suzuki	Kazunari Kochi	April 27, 1998
The police discovers the victim's phone turned off and Conan finds odd bloodstains at the crime scene. Conan investigates and puts Richard to sleep, first explaining how the killer placed a drunk Margery on top of the bookshelf with a noose around her neck which hangs her the moment she wakes up and loses her balance, then revealing Sammy Hammerstoltz as the murderer. As evidence, Sammy placed his own phone in a potted jar below Margery, then called it so she would wake up and fall to her death. Sammy confesses and says he was making replicas of Stygas's works while Margery was selling them and broke profit with him, but Margery decided to cease in fear of Stygas catching on to them, and berated Sammy's skills as a potter, enraging him in the process. He is arrested shortly afterwards.
100	106^{D}	21	"The Memories of First Love Case (Part 1)" / "The Memories of First Love (Part 1)"; Transliteration: "Hatsukoi no Hito Omoide no Jiken (Zenpen)" (Japanese: 初恋の人想い出事件（前編）)	Hirohito Ochi	N/A	May 11, 1998
While cleaning Jimmy's house, Rachel and Serena meet Annette Peters who stops by claiming to be Jimmy's first love, much to Rachel's dismay. Annette wishes to invite Jimmy to her birthday party with her mystery club, consisting of Mark, Cherie, Damon, Nory, and Tammy. Midway through the party, Annette falls asleep, so the rest of the group leave to a karaoke box. Damon goes to use the phone at the nearby convenience store, Nory gets drunk, and the group notices their rented buganlow is in flames after looking from the bar's window. Everyone rushes back and Rachel bursts through the burning building to save Annette just in time. Conan investigates and finds it odd that Annette was on the floor, not on the couch when they first left, and the fire started near the phone of all places. Since everyone was at the karaoke bar and apparently has no motive, the only logical explanation for the fire is that Annette attempted suicide, but Conan feels there is more to it.
101	107^{D}	22	"The Memories of First Love Case (Part 2)" / "The Memories of First Love (Part 2)"; Transliteration: "Hatsukoi no Hito Omoide no Jiken (Kōhen)" (Japanese: 初恋の人想い出事件（後編）)	Yasuichiro Yamamoto	N/A	May 18, 1998
During the investigation, Conan notices the furniture was moved, overhears the firefighters wondering why the birthday cake was put on a chair under the fax machine, and is confident that criminal intent is involved. The group is unnerved to hear that Annette has fled the hospital and fear she may attempt suicide again. Conan discovers the culprit after he interviews the owner of the convenience store next door to the karaoke box. Richard is knocked out while Conan elaborates how the culprit spiked Annette's drink, rearranged the furniture, and placed the candle lit cake under the fax machine. Under the guise of using the phone, the culprit sent a fax to the bungalow, igniting the fire. Conan reveals the president of the mystery club, Damon, as the arsonist. As evidence, Damon sent Annette's professor's fax as a test, still smeared with cake cream, which he still has in his possession. Damon confesses; he wanted to heroically save Annette to win her affection. However, Conan through Richard angrily calls him out, stating that Annette would've died if they hadn't made it to the villa in time and if he truly wanted her to love him, then he should've done something honorable rather than put her in danger and nearly kill her. Annette appears and scolds Damon further for his crimes. Afterwards, Annette reveals that Jimmy rejected her because he already liked a girl he "known since childhood", referring to Rachel.
102	108^{D}	23	"The Historical Drama Actor Murder Case (Part 1)" / "Fame and Misfortune (Part 1)"; Transliteration: "Jidaigeki Haiyū Satsujin Jiken (Zenpen)" (Japanese: 時代劇俳優殺人事件（前編）)	Johei Matsura	N/A	May 25, 1998
Johnny Hijikata, a famous historical samurai actor, requests Richard on advice for his next movie in which he will be playing a detective. Rachel points out the rumors that his younger wife, Isabel, is having an affair with Harrisan Blackwell, another actor and Johnny's next door neighbor who lives on the 5th floor of their complex. Richard breaks Johnny's model gun and hides it under the sofa while Johnny is away making tea. Johnny comes back to take Rachel, Conan, and Richard to the balcony of his apartment room, where they witness Isabel collapse dead, apparently from Harrisan's balcony. Although they are sure Harrisan is the killer, Conan doubts the situation when Johnny is seen with a disturbing smile on his face when he looks at his wife's corpse. In the middle of the investigation, Harrisan claims innocence though no one believes him and clues continuously point toward Johnny being the culprit. Conan discovers a smudge on the elevator digital panel, and realizes that Johnny may not be as innocent as they were led to believe.
103	109^{D}	24	"The Historical Drama Actor Murder Case (Part 2)" / "Fame and Misfortune (Part 2)"; Transliteration: "Jidaigeki Haiyū Satsujin Jiken (Kōhen)" (Japanese: 時代劇俳優殺人事件（後編）)	Kazuo Nogami	N/A	June 1, 1998
Conan returns to Johnny's apartment to prove Harrisan's innocence. Richard distracts the media while the Inspector leads Harrisan outside but is tranquilized by Conan to announce that Johnny Hijikata is the real killer. After strangling his wife to death in another room, he utilized a series of tricks including the switching of room plates and manipulating the elevator's control panel. In doing so, Johnny tricked everyone by taking them to his 6th floor condo while everyone believed they were at the 5th floor condo by creating duplicate rooms on both floors. He lowered Isabel's corpse from the 6th floor unto Harrisan's actual balcony on the 5th floor once attention was cleared, effectively framing him for the murder. As proof, Conan directs Detective Wilder to find the model gun under the sofa wielding Richard's fingerprints in the room on the 6th floor. Defeated, Johnny confesses, stating his wife was cheating on him and was needing money from her life insurance. He claims he won't do jail time as he is a celebrity, though Inspector Meguire thinks otherwise.
104	110^{D}	25	"The Case of the Mysterious Bandit Mansion (Part 1)" / "The Mystery of Bludcraven Manor (Part 1)"; Transliteration: "Tōzoku-dan Nazo no Yōkan Jiken (Zenpen)" (Japanese: 盗賊団謎の洋館事件（前編）)	Nana Harada	N/A	June 8, 1998
Richard receives a letter asking him to solve the mystery of a mansion. There, Richard, Conan, and Rachel meet Misao Nakamura and his brother. The entire mansion is filled with clocks since the previous owner, the brother's grandfather, was a clockwork artisan. Conan notices the strange mysteries – every digital clock is scratched between the two-minute digits, drilled holes are everywhere, a mirror is glued to a desk, every clock rings for one minute at 11:00, and there's someone hiding in the attic. At 1:10, three goblins figures appear from the cuckoo clock in the office.
105	111^{D}	26	"The Case of the Mysterious Bandit Mansion (Part 2)" / "The Mystery of Bludcraven Manor (Part 2)"; Transliteration: "Tōzoku-dan Nazo no Yōkan Jiken (Kōhen)" (Japanese: 盗賊団謎の洋館事件（後編）)	Hirohito Ochi	N/A	June 15, 1998
Conan figures out the mysteries of the mansion, but waits until dark to pass on clues to the struggling Kogoro. The first clue he gives is a pun that reveals 1100 means a lion. The second clue Conan gives reveals the "N", "L, and "R" letters on the goblin figure's head stand for "night", "light", and "right". By shining a light through the lion head on the front door, the light reflects through the holes throughout the mansion and onto the cuckoo clock where a cuckoo bird emerges carrying a golden watch. The two brothers show their true identity as members of a band of thieves called the Goblins, but they are taken down by Kogoro and Ran and the real Misao is released from the attic.
106	112^{D}	27	"The Scoop Photograph Murder Case" / "Snapshots of Death"; Transliteration: "Sukūpu Shashin Satsujin Jiken" (Japanese: スクープ写真殺人事件)	Johei Matsura	Junichi Miyashita	June 22, 1998
Reynold Yates wins the 35th Yomikiri Photography Award and is presented with a new watch. His victory is short lived when reporter Artie Nelson arrives and blows powder, identified as lime, in his face, causing Reynold to leave. That night, Artie phones Richard fearing for his life, but is attacked over the phone in his apartment. Conan rushes over, only to witness Artie engulfed in flames falling to his death below; Reynold is snapping pictures of the incident. In an ironic twist of fate, it is the very photos that reveals Reynold's criminal wrongdoings. Conan, with assistance from Dr. Agasa and Inspector Meguire, voices his theories through a tranquilized Richard and exposes Reynold Yates as the brutal killer he really is.

== Notes ==
- ^Jp. The episode's numbering as followed in Japan
- ^Eng. The episode's numbering as followed by Funimation Entertainment
- ^2 hrs. The episodes were aired as a single two-hour long episode in Japan
- ^D These episodes are part of the fifth season of Case Closed
