= Case Closed season 2 =

Season of television series

Case Closed
- Season 2
- The Viridian edition of the second season DVD boxset of the series Case Closed released by Funimation Entertainment
- No. of episodes: 26 (Japanese); 27 (English)

Release
- Original network: NNS (ytv)
- Original release: August 19, 1996 – April 14, 1997

Season chronology
- ← Previous; Season 1 Next → Season 3

The second season of the Case Closed anime was directed by Kenji Kodama and produced by TMS-Kyokuichi and Yomiuri Telecasting Corporation. The series is based on Gosho Aoyama's Case Closed manga series. In Japan, the series is titled Detective Conan (名探偵コナン, Meitantei Conan) but was changed due to legal issues with the title Detective Conan. The episodes' plot continues Jimmy Kudo's life as a young child named Conan Edogawa. The episodes features a temporary return of Jimmy Kudo.

The season initially ran from August 19, 1996, through April 14, 1997, on Nippon Television Network System in Japan. Episodes twenty-nine to fifty-four were later collected into seven DVD compilations by Shogakukan and were released on February 24, 2006. The season licensed and dubbed by Funimation Entertainment. Case Closed was aired on Cartoon Network's Adult Swim programming block and on Canada's YTV station. Case Closed aired until August 16, 2004, where it was dropped by Adult Swim due to low ratings. The English adaption was later collected and released on four DVD compilations. The English adaption of season two was later released in a DVD boxset by Funimation on September 30, 2008, containing episodes twenty-seven to fifty-two, twenty-six to fifty-one in the Japanese numbering. The season two DVD boxset Viridian edition is slated for release on September 15, 2009.

The episodes use nine pieces of theme music: three opening themes and two closing themes in the Japanese episodes and one opening theme and ending theme in the English ones. The first Japanese opening theme is "Mune ga Doki Doki" (胸がドキドキ, lit. "My Heart Pounds") by The High-Lows to episode thirty. The second opening theme is "Feel Your Heart" by Velvet Garden until episode fifty-two. It is followed by "Nazo" (謎, lit. "Mystery") by Miho Komatsu. The first ending theme is "Meikyū no Lovers" (迷宮のラヴァーズ, lit. "Lovers of the Labyrinth") by Heath until episode fifty-one. The remaining episodes use the ending theme "Hikari to Kage no Roman" (光と影のロマン, lit. "Romance of Light and Shadow") by Keiko Utoko. The English opening theme is "Mune ga Doki Doki" with English lyrics and renamed "First New Century" by Carl Finch until episode fifty-four. It is followed by "Nazo" with English lyrics by Stephanie Nadolny for the rest of the episodes. The English ending theme is "Step by Step" with English lyrics by Carl Finch to episode fifty-two. It is later followed by "Hikari to Kage no Roman" with English lyrics also by Stephanie Nadolny.

== Episode list ==
Orig.^{Jp.}	Funi.^{Eng.}	No. in season	Crunchyroll translated title/Funimation title Original Japanese title	Directed by	Written by	Original release date	English air date
29	30	1	"The Computer Murder Case"; Transliteration: "Konpyūtā Satsujin Jiken" (Japanese: コンピューター殺人事件)	Johei Matsura	Kazunari Kochi	August 19, 1996	July 13, 2004
Okida, CEO of a computer software company, is found dead from a heart attack. Conan finds it strange that Okida was sweating a lot before his death, and that flowers that had been delivered the day before had already wilted. Conan notices that Tokito, Okida's driver, is the only one with a motive to murder him. Tokito once owned a computer company himself but signed everything over to Okida, who berated and humiliated Tokito whenever the opportunity presented itself. Conan realizes that the heart attack was caused by thermal shock in a short period of time, noting the dead flowers and solidified chocolates. Using the voice changing bow-tie, he uses Kogoro and Inspector Joseph Megure‘s voices in order to have them meet at Tokito's house where Conan drops subtle hints to reveal Tokito as the murderer. Using the evidence that Tokito took Okida's cat home with him that day, Tokito confesses to murdering Okida by hacking the computer that regulates the houses temperature and turns himself in.\
30	31	2	"The Alibi Testimony Murder Case" / "The Missing Melody"; Transliteration: "Aribai Shōgen Satsujin Jiken" (Japanese: アリバイ証言殺人事件)	Masato Sato	Junichi Miyashita	August 26, 1996	July 14, 2004
Kogoro, Ran, and Conan are meeting with lawyer Tatsumi Souhei at his office inside a hotel. Souhei receives a call from his wife, Tatsumi Kazumi, and a musical melody can be heard from her end of the phone call. After the meeting, Kogoro explains to Conan that he was hired to tail his cheating wife, Kazumi. They walk home and pass by Souhei’s manor which is surrounded by police investigating the murder of Kazumi who was found bound, gagged, strangled to death, and stuffed into a bathtub. Conan finds a staple by the body and suspects Souhei to be the murderer, but Kogoro confirms his alibi, prompting Conan to head back to the hotel. He learns the hotel room beside Souhei's is reserved for guests and also learns the melody from a music box alarm clock is custom made for that hotel. At Kazumi’s funeral, a man named Hirose Shunzou reveals he was her lover. The officers plan to arrest him for the murder of Kazumi, but Conan tranquilizes Kogoro, revealing Souhei to be the killer. After Souhei was done with Kogoro, he murdered his wife who was in the guest room beside him, then placed his wife in a bag and threw her down a laundry chute to the bottom floor. He retrieved Kazumi’s corpse, put it in the trunk, and drove it home where he then placed her body in the bathtub. As evidence, Conan gives Megure a tape of the alarm clock in Souhei's guest room to compare with the recorded phone call; it is revealed to have a missing note and matches with the musical melody in the phone call. Souhei confesses to the murder and reveals Kazumi was blackmailing him for money in order to keep his corrupt deeds as a lawyer hidden.
31	32	3	"The TV Station Murder Case" / "Murder at the Television Studio"; Transliteration: "Terebi-kyoku Satsujin Jiken" (Japanese: テレビ局殺人事件)	Hirohito Ochi	N/A	September 2, 1996	July 15, 2004
Matsuo Takashi, the host of Prime time Mystery hour, disturbingly shoots a picture with him and co-host Suwa Michihiko. Later, Kogoro is invited to appear on the aforementioned show at the studio as special guest. During a 4 minute break, Michihiko receives a call from Takeshi, who brutally murders him with a shot between his eyes. Michihiko’s corpse is discovered and Conan immediately suspects Takeshi due to the smirk on his face, however, Takeshi and Michihiko were on different floors of the building during the time of Michihiko's murder, making it impossible. Conan investigates and finds missing blood splatter on the window and a bullet hole outside and notices the storage room is two floors up from where Michihiko was killed. Conan realizes how the murder was done, and lures Kogoro to the room and puts him to sleep. Thorough Kogoro, Conan reveals that Takeshi called Michihiko announcing suicidal intentions. In doing so, Michihiko was coaxed into looking outside his window and was murdered; Takeshi dropped the gun into the open window which is how the gun was found in the room with him, and then returned to the ninth floor with time to spare. As evidence, the redial button remains active, and pressing it will call Michihiko’s phone as opposed to Takeshi claiming he didn’t know his number. Takeshi confesses and reveals that it had to be done in order to save the show from being canceled. Afterwards, Kogoro wakes up and suspects Conan is the cause of his sudden drowsiness during a case. Before he could pursue that idea any further, the appearance of Okino Yoko distracts him, leaving Kogoro hopeless.
32	33	4	"The Coffee Shop Murder Case" / "Murder at the Local Diner"; Transliteration: "Kōhī Shoppu Satsujin Jiken" (Japanese: コーヒーショップ殺人事件)	Kazuo Nogami	N/A	September 9, 1996	July 19, 2004
Conan catches Ran leaving to go on a date, supposedly with Kudo Shinichi. Conan, knowing it's a lie, follows her to a coffee shop where she admits to be waiting for someone else important. Ran leaves to buy some cake for Conan who stays at the coffee shop. A woman named Himeno Yayoi is found murdered in a bathroom stall; the four people who came in around the time Yayoi did, Wakaoji Shiro, Sumeragi Yuichi, Tonoyama Juzo, and Kisaki Eri are suspects to the crime. The police arrive and assume the criminal crawled above the bathroom stall to leave the scene, cutting down the suspects to two people. Conan notices that there's blood on top of the stall. He realizes how the murder occurred and drops subtle hints. Suspect Kisaki Eri (who Conan thinks is vaguely familiar) picks up on the hints naming Juzo the murderer. She reveals that Juzo strangled Yayoi, threw her over the stall, tied a rope to a knife and stabbed her, and pulled his knife back after he threw her over the stall. As evidence, Conan notices the bandages around Juzo’s fingers have been tied around different fingers, showing the bandages were used to strangle Yayoi and were tied to the knife to throw it over. Juzo killed Yayoi in order to keep his affair with her a secret from his wife. Eri is revealed to be Kogoro’s ex-wife and Ran's mother; Conan then remembers how she used to scold him and Ran.
33	34	5	"The Detective League Survival Case" / "A Hunting We Will Go"; Transliteration: "Tantei-dan Sabaibaru Jiken" (Japanese: 探偵団サバイバル事件)	Ko Matsuzono	Ryoko Nabewari	October 14, 1996	July 20, 2004
Professor Agasa takes the Junior Detective Boys to a field and gives them a treasure map. While following the treasure map, they are pursued by two men. The puzzles lead them to a cave where they find a bag containing jewelry recently stolen from a store. They are then confronted by the two men, who are really jewel thieves. Conan disarms the men by kicking the bags containing their stolen jewelry at them. They continue further into the cave and find the treasure the map was referring to. Inside is a letter telling them their adventure was the treasure and will become a priceless memory in the future. Conan finds his father's signature on the letter and realizes his father, Kudo Yusaku, created the treasure hunt many years ago. Old saying: "It's not so much the destination, but the journey to it."
34	35	6	"The Mountain Lodge Bandage Man Murder Case (Part 1)" / "Mountain Villa Murder (Part 1)"; Transliteration: "Sansō Hōtai Otoko Satsujin Jiken (Zenpen)" (Japanese: 山荘包帯男殺人事件（前編）)	Yasuichiro Yamamoto	N/A	October 21, 1996	July 21, 2004
Sonoko invites Ran, who brings along Conan, to her sister Ayako’s film club reunion (consisting of Sumiya Hiroki, Takahashi Ryoichi, award-winning writer Ikeda Chikako, and Ohta Masaru) at her villa in the mountains. When they arrive, they see a mysterious man wrapped in bandages on the bridge who flees once he is noticed. Ran searches for her room but barges in on the others while they were changing clothes. While they had a small chat, Tokumoto Atsuko, the sixth member of the group, is mentioned, enraging Chikako who then walks through the woods. Later, the bandaged man attempts to murder Ran with an axe but fails when Conan intervenes. Suddenly, Chikako is kidnapped, gruesomely murdered, decapitated, and her body dismembered; her remains are found throughout the woods. Their means of escape have been destroyed and Conan later finds out that Chikako had been lured outside with a note, believing the killer to be someone associated with her. Ran is attacked again in her sleep by the killer but is saved by Conan, who is injured in the attack and is left wondering why the killer is targeting her in the first place.
35	36	7	"The Mountain Lodge Bandage Man Murder Case (Part 2)" / "Mountain Villa Murder (Part 2)"; Transliteration: "Sansō Hōtai Otoko Satsujin Jiken (Kōhen)" (Japanese: 山荘包帯男殺人事件（後編）)	Masato Sato	N/A	October 28, 1996	July 22, 2004
The bandaged killer tries to go after Ran’s life again but she breaks the killer’s axe with a karate kick. When Conan figures out the case, he attempts tranquilizing Ran but knocks out Sonoko instead and reveals that Ryoichi, the set designer, killed Chikako. Conan elaborates how Ryoichi had already murdered Chikako, then faked her kidnapping with her severed head and a dummy that he made rush past the window to create the illusion that she was taken against her will. Ryoichi is also revealed to have faked obesity; he stuffed his shirt with the axe murderer's costume and at one point, Chikako's head, making him appear heavier than he actually is. Ran had seen a much-thinner Ryoichi momentarily when she accidentally barged into his room, therefore becoming a target before even realizing what she saw. Ryoichi confesses and explains that Atsuko, the sixth member of the club, wrote Blue Kingdom, an award-winning script that Chikako stole, took credit for, and won an award and a day later, Atsuko committed suicide, enraging Ryoichi. He attempts suicide but is stopped when Conan, through Sonoko, scolds him for trying to murder Ran and killing Chikako, stating his actions have dishonored Atsuko's memory. Ryoichi brokenheartedly surrenders to the club.
36	37	8	"The Monday, 7:30 P.M. Murder Case" / "Wrong Place at the Wrong Time"; Transliteration: "Getsuyō Yoru Shichiji Sanjūpun Satsujin Jiken" (Japanese: 月曜夜7時30分殺人事件)	Johei Matsura	Kazunari Kochi	November 4, 1996	July 26, 2004
Ayumi is going to Sawaki Yoko’s dentistry office to get rid of a baby tooth and she decides to keep a Masked Yaiba card with her for good luck. Meanwhile, Nakamoto Katsuhiko, a real estate manager and Yoko’s neighbor, is viciously murdered when he is stabbed in the heart with a syringe by someone knocking at his door. Yoko discovers Katsuhiko’s corpse near her apartment in his condominium and his time of death is exactly 7:30PM. The police suspect Yoko because she has a motive, but she also had an alibi. She was with Ayumi at her office watching the TV show Masked Yaiba at that time. While visiting her apartment, Conan realizes the illusion used and accuses Yoko as the murderer. She decorated her apartment to look exactly like the waiting room at her dentist office and, using two sedatives and her car, convinced Ayumi she was at the office the entire time when at one point they were in her condo, at exactly 7:30PM when the crime took place. To incriminate Yoko, Ayumi placed the Masked Yaiba card from the office trading card deck into the condo trading card deck. Yoko confesses and states revenge as her motive, Katsuhiko kidnapped then murdered her brother with her as a witness but due to her being young, the case was dropped. Yoko turns herself in without resistance.
37	38	9	"The Cactus Flower Murder Case" / "Prickly Past"; Transliteration: "Saboten no Hana Satsujin Jiken" (Japanese: サボテンの花殺人事件)	Susumu Ishizaki	Kazunari Kochi	November 11, 1996	July 27, 2004
Okaya Noriko comes to Kogoro’s office asking for help to look for a man named Kitagawa Tsuyoshi. She presents a rough sketch of Tsuyoshi along with a picture of his red sports car and the license plate. The next day while on the way to the aquarium with the Junior Detective Boys, Conan sees Noriko in funeral-wear and follows her to the grave of her old boyfriend, Yamaguchi Tatsuo where she meets an acquaintance of hers, Saeki. Conan shows himself to Saeki, who is the doctor who rehabilitated Noriko after she and Tatsuo were involved in a car accident; Noriko barely escaped but Tatsuo burned to death. Conan finds out Tatsuo had an affinity for growing Christmas cacti and all his plants went to the doctor after his death. He also discovers that Noriko, after the crash, rehabilitated after only three months instead of the expected six, due only to motivation and adrenaline. Conan concludes Noriko asked Kogoro to find Tsuyoshi so she can avenge Tatsuo’s death. Conan and Saeki meet up with Kogoro and Ran at Tsuyoshi's address only to find Noriko about to burn Tsuyoshi and his girlfriend Naomi alive. Using Tatsuo's cacti and a bit of coaxing, Conan calms Noriko and she surrenders.
38	39	10	"The Akaoni Fire Festival Murder Case" / "Flames of Confusion"; Transliteration: "Akaoni Mura Himatsuri Sastujin Jiken" (Japanese: 赤鬼村火祭殺人事件)	Hirohito Ochi	N/A	November 18, 1996	July 28, 2004
Kogoro is asked by Abe Yutaka to trail his friend, Negishi Masaki, for three days to protect him from possible danger. On the night after the third day, Masaki is found dead from fourth-degree burns during an annual Fire Festival, his horrifically charred remains emerged from the bonfire in front of thousands. Yutaka gains over $5 million of life insurance money as part of a bet between the two and displays very uncaring behavior. Kogoro lists him as the prime suspect, however, since Yutaka was on a business trip when the murder took place, he has a perfect alibi. With clues from the photos taken by Kogoro and Yutaka, Conan gets to the bottom of the case but discovers that Yutaka is planning on fleeing Japan. Using his voice modulator, he convinces Inspector Megure and Kogoro to meet at the airport. At the airport, Conan intercepts Yutaka and thoroughly breaks his alibi: Masaki was murdered before Yutaka’s trip and his corpse was stashed in the bonfire pit and Yutaka paid a lookalike to walk around town while Kogoro followed him. When Yutaka admits to murdering Masaki but refuses to turn himself in, Conan recorded his words and threatens to show the police. An enraged Yutaka attempts to murder Conan but is swiftly brought down after Conan kicks a tire at him and he is arrested after the recording is heard by police.
39	40	11	"The Wealthy Daughter Murder Case (Part 1)" / "Billionaire Birthday Blues (Part 1)"; Transliteration: "Shisanka Reijō Satsujin Jiken (Zenpen)" (Japanese: 資産家令嬢殺人事件（前編）)	Izumi Shimura	N/A	November 25, 1996	July 29, 2004
Yotsui Reika, daughter of billionaire Mr. Yotsui, is having a birthday party and invites Kogoro, who brings Ran and Conan, as a special guest. The party abruptly ends when some guests discover the tires on their cars had been slashed, forcing Ichieda Takashi, Gojo Osamu, Mifune Takuya, Rokuda Masashi, Nikaido Yuji, and house maid Nanao Yone to spend the night. Reika goes to change clothes, but is never seen again and Takuya mentions an accident that was promised to not be spoken of. The group splits up and searches for her, but Conan and Kogoro find Yuji drowned to death in the fountain, and the still missing Reika is to blame. To calm everyone's nerves, Yone and Ran volunteer to make tea. Ran sips her tea, feels tired, and soon falls sleep. Conan brings up the accident the group was talking about and believes it may have something to do with Yuji's murder: Nanao Yaeko, Yone's granddaughter, drowned apparently with no life vest, attempting to save Reika and Yuji after they got caught in a storm which left them stranded on an island. During the night, a power failure occurs, Ran is nearly drowned to death, and Kogoro believes that a serial killer is amongst them, randomly attacking the guests. Ran is dazed and it appears her tea was drugged with sleeping pills. Conan finds a few clues and is convinced that the killer is one of the guests staying at the mansion. Takashi makes coffee but spills it on Conan and Kogoro, prompting them to go wash in the bathroom, only to find Reika drowned to death in the bathtub.
40	41	12	"The Wealthy Daughter Murder Case (Part 2)" / "Billionaire Birthday Blues (Part 2)"; Transliteration: "Shisanka Reijō Satsujin Jiken (Kōhen)" (Japanese: 資産家令嬢殺人事件（後編）)	Yasuichiro Yamamoto	N/A	December 2, 1996	August 2, 2004
Reika’s drenched corpse is pulled from the bathtub. Kogoro finds that she had been bound with rope, duct taped, and her clothes were soaking wet. After accidentally turning on the shower and being warned about getting wet, Conan tranquilizes Kogoro and asks the men to remove their jackets and he takes note of where water stains are located on the men's shirts before revealing Takashi as the murderer. He rejoined Yuji in searching for Reika alone, giving him the perfect opportunity to murder him. Takashi then caused a power failure and smashed a window to make it look like the murderer escaped. He took advantage of the darkness and attacked Ran, who was chosen at random; gaining a witness to confirm that Reika was held underwater in the same manner as Yuji was the target in this incident. Though it appeared Reika was drowned the same way, she did not. Reika was duct taped to the bottom of the bathtub with the shower-head turned on to ensure she drowned slowly and quietly, thus solidifying Takashi’s alibi. As evidence, his elbows have water stains on them when he removed Reika, as he rolled up his sleeves. Takashi confesses, stating Yaeko was killed by Reika and Yuji. Yaeko only had one spare life jacket including the one she had on, meaning they took the life jackets and left Yaeko to die. He also talked with Reika and Yuji and both confessed to killing Yaeko, before being killed themselves, and all this was done in revenge. Yone, while devastated at this revelation, disapproves of Takashi's actions.
41	42	13	"The Shredded Championship Flag Case" / "Left in Tatters"; Transliteration: "Yūshōki Kirisaki Jiken" (Japanese: 優勝旗切り裂き事件)	Johei Matsura	Junichi Miyashita	December 9, 1996	August 3, 2004
Ran, Sonoko and Conan attend a high school baseball game. The reigning champions, Shukou Academy, are playing against Beika High School for a chance to get into the playoffs. Shukou High's star pitcher, Kaji Kenya, is shutting out Beika High when he notices something in his direction. The umpire calls a ball and the game resumes, only this time Kenya's pitches are failing. The coach changes pitchers and Kenya runs in the school. The game continues and Beika High continues to score runs. Suddenly, the storeroom manager alerts the principal of Shukou Academy that last year's championship flag had been slashed. The game stops and the players and principal pile into the school. Kogoro examines the flag and discovers that the flag was cut with short slashes primarily to the left side near the stave, the window had been smashed and a ladder is outside against the school wall. The principal states that because of this incident, Shukou Academy will withdraw from the playoffs. The storeroom manager says that the office and storeroom key are gone. Kogoro realizes the ladder was planted and this was an inside job. With these clues, he labels the suspects, Kenya, ex-pitcher Etou, the principal of Shukou High and Kenya's mother. Kenya confesses that he cut the flag. His mother steps in, saying he is just protecting her. He cuts her off and presents Kogoro with the Xacto-blade used to commit the crime. Kogoro calls the case closed but Conan isn't satisfied. After Conan talks to Sonoko about the school's academic history, he puts the pieces together and solves the case, lures Kogoro into the office and puts him to sleep. Using Kogoro's voice, he calls everyone over the intercom to the office. Using earlier evidence, the guilty party had to have been short, left handed and was in the building at the time of the crime. Kenya is right-handed and fairly tall, taking him off the suspect list. Etou is too tall to the commit the crime, and Kenya's mother is right-handed. Only the principal is left-handed, short and was in the building at the time of the slashing. He confesses and says the chairman of the school wanted the baseball team disbanded because he thought it was getting in the way of the students' studies. The storeroom clerk shows up once again to report the chairman, who was thought to be ill, has died, making the principal's actions useless. Six months later, under the management of Kenya's mother, Shukou Academy wins the championship flag once again.
42	43	14	"The Karaoke Box Murder Case" / "Karaoke Killing"; Transliteration: "Karaoke Bokkusu Satsujin Jiken" (Japanese: カラオケボックス殺人事件)	Masato Sato	Toshiki Inoue	December 16, 1996	August 4, 2004
Sonoko takes Ran and Conan to a karaoke bar to visit her new acquaintance, pop-star Kimura Tatsuya of the band Lex, and his band mates: guitarist Shibazaki Mieko, manager Terahara Mari, and drummer Yamada Katsumi. Tatsuya appears to hate everyone and displays an arrogant, selfish personality. His signature song, "Bloody Venus", begins playing. Tatsuya rips his jacket off as part of the performance. Former Lex member and caterer Sumii Go brings food and Tatsuya grabs a rice ball, eats it, and suddenly collapses dead on the floor. Upon initial examination, Conan smells cyanide and realizes that Tatsuya was murdered. He notices a photograph in the room of another band member. In the photograph is Tatusya, Katsumi, and two unknown women. Katsumi says one of the women is Mari, even though she looks nothing like the current Mari. Using past evidence, Conan, using Shinichi’s voice, calls everyone back to the karaoke room. When Tatusya ripped his jacket off during "Bloody Venus", his hand touched cyanide that was coated on the outer layer of his band jacket. His death was hurried when he ate a riceball with his contaminated hand. The killer is revealed to be Mari and as proof, she has Tatsuya’s lighter in her possession; she switched jackets to conceal evidence. Mari confesses and says that Tatsuya hated her after she had plastic surgery, even though it was to impress him. However, Tatsuya had actually liked how she originally looked, and could not forgive himself after finding out that Mari had specifically gotten plastic surgery to look beautiful for him since he would've never asked her to change how she looks. On the back of the photograph is a love song written by Tatsuya dedicated to Mari making her realize he did still, in fact, love her. Mari realizes her mistake and bursts into tears.
43	44	15	"The Conan Edogawa Abduction Case" / "Conan Is Kidnapped"; Transliteration: "Edogawa Konan Yūkai Jiken" (Japanese: 江戸川コナン誘拐事件)	Susumu Ishizaki	N/A	January 13, 1997	August 5, 2004
Edogawa Fumiyo shows up claiming to be Conan's mother, though he technically is not supposed to have one. Conan leaves with Fumiyo, demanding to know what her intentions are, where she reveals that she knows he is actually Kudo Shinichi, gives insight on his parents, their history, and her allegiance with the Black Organization. Conan escapes and runs to Dr. Agasa‘s for refuge but is chloroformed by Fumiyo. He awakens tied up and overhears Fumiyo and a masked man talking about the APTX 4869 poison and a planned murder. Conan fakes his escape by hiding in a wine cellar and follows clues that lead him to the Baker Hotel, room 301. The masked man catches Conan in the closet having used room service as a decoy, forces him out, and shoots a dart at his head. The masked man, Fumiyo, and their client unmask themselves to be Kudo Yusaku and Kudo Yukiko, Shinichi's real parents and Dr. Agasa, respectively. Yusaku reveals that he was dressed as his character, Night Baron, he planned the whole scenario, and wished for Shinichi to cease looking for the Men in Black. He wants Shinichi to come with them overseas, but he refuses. As revenge for all the trouble, Conan informs Yusaku's editors about what plane his parents were boarding since Yusaku had multiple manuscripts due for multiple editors.
44	45	16	"The Three Hotta Siblings Murder Case" / "Unhappy Birthday"; Transliteration: "Hotta Sankyōdai Satsujin Jiken" (Japanese: 堀田三兄弟殺人事件)	Hirohito Ochi	Yuichi Higurashi	January 20, 1997	August 9, 2004
When Kogoro, Ran and Conan are on the way to work on a case, they pick up Hotta Kosaku whose having car troubles on the side of the road. In return for the ride, Kosaku invites them to his birthday party where they meet Hotta Ryoji, Hotta Koichi, Hotta Harumi, and the groundskeeper Yamauchi Masahiro. Hotta Fumiko, Kosaku’s estranged daughter, makes an appearance and Kosaku quickly dismisses her. An argument leads Kosaku to excuse himself to his room, where he is killed when a massive explosion occurs. Fumiko denies involvement but is happy to see her father dead. Conan investigates and determines the bomb was homemade after Kosaku’s corpse is found covered in fertilizer. Kogoro is put to sleep and Conan declares the groundkeeper Masahiro to be the killer as he is the only one with access to chemicals and also possesses skills to engineer a bomb strong enough to destroy one room and kill one person. Masahiro confesses saying that his son, who was a pianist, was driven to suicide by Kosaku because when Kentaro asked for his permission to date his daughter Fumiko he broke Kentaro's hand in response which made him unable to play piano anymore. Masahiro was planning to murder Fumiko, who he sent a fake invitation to, but that failed when Conan warned her of the situation.
45	46	17	"The Face Pack Murder Case" / "Unexpected Visitors"; Transliteration: "Kaopakku Satsujin Jiken" (Japanese: 顔パック殺人事件)	Yasuichiro Yamamoto	Yuichi Higurashi	January 27, 1997	August 10, 2004
Kojima Ikuko has been choked to death in her own home and three suspects are brought in; her daughter Kojima Chihiro, home security worker Yoshioka Juro, and her employee Izumi Takeo. It is revealed that Takeo was embezzling money and Ikuko was going to expose him, so he had a motive, but she was already dead when he arrived at her house. Chihiro is extremely suspicious because of her bad relationship with her mother and reveals that Ikuko was indeed dead when she was there. Conan discovers that a facial mask was applied to the victim and one of her contact lens is missing. Chihiro later dressed her mother to look the same to throw off suspicion but forgot to wipe off her lipstick while in disguise. Nevertheless, Conan tranquilizes Kogoro and reveals Takeo to be the killer. Somehow, while Takeo was murdering Ikuko, her contact lens fell out into the helm of his slacks. Takeo confesses that Ikuko was going to sue him then asked his parents to sell their land for his sake.
46	47	18	"The Snowy Mountain Lodge Murder Case" / "A Game of Murder"; Transliteration: "Yukiyama Sansō Satsujin Jiken" (Japanese: 雪山山荘殺人事件)	Johei Matsuura	N/A	February 3, 1997	August 11, 2004
Ran, Kogoro and Conan are skiing in the mountains where they meet Dr. Oyama Masashi and his students, Nakahara Kaori, Kanazawa Tomoyasu, Tobita Ginji, and Ezumi Kaho. Dr. Masashi offers to let the trio stay the night at their place due to a dangerous snowstorm. While watching his favorite soap opera, Dr. Masashi is murdered in a gruesome fashion but takes comfort in knowing Kogoro will follow the clues to track his killer down. Conan determines the murder was an inside job, and that it was one of the 4 students. Two have air-tight alibis, but the other two are suspects. Conan, through Kogoro, announces Kaori as the killer. Dr. Masashi, on the verge of death, managed to leave a dying message. Kaori, the first to find Dr. Masashi dead, understood it and attempted to wipe it away, but failed due to the blood having already dried, ("Kaori" is the same name as a shogi piece.) Kaori confesses saying Dr. Masashi stole her father’s thesis statement and took full credit.
47	48	19	"The Sports Club Murder Case" / "The Last Dive"; Transliteration: "Supōtsu Kurabu Satsujin Jiken" (Japanese: スポーツクラブ殺人事件)	Susumu Ishizaki	Junichi Miyashita	February 10, 1997	—
Saijo Naoya, the reigning diving champion, has apparently drowned to death; he was diving in the dark and struck his head on another diving board. Foul play is suggested when Conan notes the earplugs are not the same brand that the victim usually wears and finds clothes in the victim’s locker which smells like chloroform. Conan suspects Saeki Reiko, who is being blackmailed for tax evasion, Naruse Keiichi who lost the championship to Naoya, and Kijima Hisashi who was also blackmailed for having an affair. With doubts in mind, Conan goes to question an elderly artist who lives in the adjacent building. He shows Conan a sketch of the diver though he didn’t see his face because the pool area was dimmed. Conan notices that in the sketch are sparkles. At the sports club, Kogoro is put to sleep and Conan reveals that Naoya was murdered poolside with a brick. His killer, revealed to be Hisashi, deliberately dimmed the lights and took a dive, not the victim. As evidence, the elderly artist sketched every aspect of the diver’s performance, even the sparkle. Hisashi is the only suspect wearing earrings. He confesses that Naoya’s blackmail is what drove him to murder.
48	49	20	"The Diplomat Murder Case (Part 1)" / "No Immunity for the Diplomat (Part 1)"; Transliteration: "Gaikōkan Satsujin Jiken (Zenpen)" (Japanese: 外交官殺人事件（前編）)	Kazuo Nogami	N/A	February 17, 1997	August 12, 2004
Hattori Heiji, a high-school detective from the west side of Japan, is searching for Kudo Shinichi to test his skills. To help an ill Conan with his cold, Heiji offers him an unknown drink, revealed to be baijiu (an alcoholic drink). Soon after, Tsujimura Kimie, wife to diplomat Tsujimura Isao, wants Kogoro to investigate her son Tsujimura Takayoshi’s girlfriend, Katsuragi Yukiko, believing she is too perfect. Kogoro and the gang are invited to Kimie’s estate where they enter Isao’s study. Kimie tries to wake up the seemingly sleeping Isao, only to discover him dead. Heiji and Conan discern Isao was killed by a needle dipped in a powerful neurotoxin and his death was recent. The room, however, was locked. Isao and Kimie are the only ones with access to the study. Conan and Heiji attempt to deduce the locked room mystery, the reasons the stereo was playing loud opera music, and the stack of books placed in front of Isao. Conan's cold worsens, causing him to be bedridden in another room, while Heiji discovers the murderer‘s method: the culprit placed scotch tape inside the key holder and pierced a string through the victim's pocket, allowing the culprit to leave the room, lock the study, and pull the string causing the keys to slide back into the victim's target. As evidence, Heiji found some string and needle in the trash. With Conan out of action, Heiji proceeds to reveal Isao‘s killer.
49	50	21	"The Diplomat Murder Case (Part 2)" / "No Immunity for the Diplomat (Part 2)"; Transliteration: "Gaikōkan Satsujin Jiken (Kōhen)" (Japanese: 外交官殺人事件（後編）)	Susumu Ishizaki	N/A	February 24, 1997	August 16, 2004
Heiji concludes the murderer to be Isao’s father Tsujimura Toshimitsu since he was in the room where the string and needle was found. However, Shinichi appears and reveals that Heiji's deduction of the murder is incorrect, stating that the key's position inside Isao's pocket would be impossible if he was murdered that way due to the entrance of the inner pocket narrowing due to Isao sitting down. He explains that there were strings and needles placed in multiple rooms which were meant to frame Isao's father. For the real method, Shinichi explains that Isao was killed when everyone first came into the room. The opera music playing and the stack of books were there to cover the victim's screams and face in case Isao woke up after being pricked by the poisoned needle. He then reveals the murderer to be Kimie and exclaims the evidence is in her key-holder which should open to reveal the groove of a needle. Kimie confesses and explains Isao framed Yamashiro Kenji, her first husband, of corruption resulting in him being put in jail and dying in there and he also coaxed her into marrying him. Isao revealed it all in a fit of rage when he discovered Takayoshi was dating Yukiko, who is the daughter of Kimie and Kenji. Kimie then formulated a plan to murder him. As Kimie is taken away by the police, Shinichi escapes to the bathroom and becomes Conan again. Ran finds him in the bathroom and asks him about Shinichi's whereabouts, but Conan collapses soon after. Three days later, Conan plans on drinking more baijiu to become Shinichi again, but Ran hides it upon discovering him drinking alcohol. Conan is escorted by his friends to the library, he opts to play with them one last time before returning to normal.
50	51	22	"The Library Murder Case" / "The Book Without Pages"; Transliteration: "Toshokan Satsujin Jiken" (Japanese: 図書館殺人事件)	Hirohito Ochi	N/A	March 3, 1997	—
A librarian is hiding more than just foreign books in the shelves. Conan and the Detective Boys sneak into the library at night after seeing police look for a corpse of a missing librarian. They see the director, Tsugawa Shuji, packing imported books that Conan found wrapped up earlier into a briefcase. Unaware of the children's presence, he boasts to himself of being able to hide the body of the missing librarian in the library without the police finding it. They decide to look for the remaining books that Tsugawa Shuji wasn't able to take with him. After an exhausting search, they realize that there is a middle row of books between the outside two that doesn't have a spine giving the impression of it being the opposite book. In each of these fakes they find packets of narcotics. Realizing that the body is on top of the elevator Conan calls it up while manually opening the door. They find the dead body of the missing librarian Tamada Kazuo but inside the elevator there is the director Tsugawa Shuji. After narrowly escaping him they set a trap for him which knocks him out.
51	52	23	"The Golf Range Murder Case" / "Driving a Bomb"; Transliteration: "Gorufu Renshuujō Satsujin Jiken" (Japanese: ゴルフ練習場殺人事件)	Johei Matsuura	Kazunari Kochi	March 10, 1997	—
A relaxing day at the driving range leads Conan, Kogoro, and Ran to their next explosive case, as the president of a leading electronics manufacturer Tachibana Eisuke meets an untimely end. Kogoro believes the vice president Yasuito Minoru was responsible for placing a bomb inside a golf ball. Conan discovers a burnt golf ball and realizes that the bomb was in the golf club. He deduces that Minami Tomofumi, the assistant, was the killer. He reveals he is the president's son and wanted his father's company and implies he killed others to inherit it; adding to the fact is only one side of his suit is ruined by the blast, meaning he was instinctively trying to protect himself. As the police drag him away, Conan believes that there may have been some good in him, as he had tried to make Conan leave the area before the bomb went off.
52	53^{B}	24	"The Legendary Kiri Tengu Murders^{1 hr.}" / "The Mist Goblin Murder (Part 1)"; Transliteration: "Kiri-tengu Densetsu Satsujin Jiken" (Japanese: 霧天狗伝説殺人事件)	Kazuo Nogami Yasuichiro Yamamoto	Kazunari Kochi	March 17, 1997	—
One rainy day, Ran, Conan and Richard lose their way home and are about to spend the night in the car when Conan luckily finds a Buddhist temple which sits near a waterfall. Bonzai Tenei, the temple's owner, welcomes them and introduces his students studying under him: Tonnen, Kannen, Mokunen, and Shunen. During dinner, Bonsai explains how they take rubber boats up the river to the nearby beach in their free time. He also tells them about the legendary Mist Goblin, an ancient creature possessing immense strength that seeks unfortunate victims to hang from the tallest trees in the forest. When the students hear Kogoro is a detective, Bonzai angrily snaps and wants him out of the Temple by tomorrow. That night, Ran scares Kogoro with a Mist Goblin mask as payback for picking on her. The next day, Bonzai has gone missing but is found hanged from the center beam of the Discipline Room, 10 meters above the ground. The beam he was hung from has no trace of evidence. Conan and the investigation team find that the same thing happened 2 years ago: a student was killed, eerily under the same exact circumstances, allegedly by the Mist Goblin.
52	54^{B}	25	"The Legendary Kiri Tengu Murders^{1 hr.}" / "The Mist Goblin Murder (Part 2)"; Transliteration: "Kiri-tengu Densetsu Satsujin Jiken" (Japanese: 霧天狗伝説殺人事件)	Kazuo Nogami Yasuichiro Yamamoto	Kazunari Kochi	March 17, 1997	—
Continuing on, Conan discovers a dashboard, rubber boat, an axe, and debris in the grassy field below the temple. Richard accidentally knocks himself while Conan uses the opportunity to use his voice and reveal that Bonzai was murdered last night before being hanged. After taping the bottom door shut, the murderer used a dashboard, diverting water from the waterfall to fill the room up. The killer placed Bonzai's corpse in the rubber boat, where he hung the corpse on the center beam once at the top, then escaped out the top windo. The water is drained by creating a large hole in the wall with an axe. Conan names Shunen the murderer, revealing Shunen didn't hear Kogoro's scream the night before and noting a piece of debris with double-sided tape on it which yields his fingerprints. Shunen reveals Chunen, the student killed 2 years ago, is his brother and who was murdered by Bonsai because he didn’t want his students dating his granddaughter Caitlin. Shunen enrolled at the temple to find out the truth; he eventually discovered the trick, but didn’t know who used it. He confronted a drunken Bonzai after he refused to discuss his former student‘s death with Kogoro. He confessed to murdering Chunen, and is then murdered by Shunen in a fit of rage, his death covered up to look like the legendary Mist Goblin had struck again. Shunen is then arrested for his crime.
53	55^{B}	26	"The Mystery Weapon Murder" / "Weapon of Choice"; Transliteration: "Nazo no Kyouki Satsujin Jiken" (Japanese: 謎の凶器殺人事件)	Hirohito Ochi	Kazunari Kochi	April 7, 1997	—
After finding a wounded bird on the ground, Conan, Kogoro, and Ran hear a scream coming from the building next to them. Once upon entering the building, they find Imoto Ryuusuke, an arrogant businessman, on his balcony, bashed to death and the murder weapon appears to be the potted plant beside his corpse. Suspects in the case is his soon-to-be-divorced wife Imoto Takako, Dobashi Tetsuo, and Terasawa Norio. The only real clues at this point are metallic sounds heard from a suspect, the wounded bird from earlier, and fresh scratches on the railing nearby. Conan understands the situation at hand and drops hints for Kogoro, allowing him to form a theory and reveal Norio as the killer. From the abandoned building next door, Norio flung a weighted object and struck the back of Ryuusuke’s head, killing him instantly. Proof of his guilt is the footprint he left behind when he flung his weapon. Norio confesses and says Ryuusuke drove him out of business. Afterwards, Kogoro tries surf fishing but ends up falling into the river.
54	56^{B}	27	"The Game Company Murder Case" / "Game Gone Bad"; Transliteration: "Gēmu Kaisha Satsujin Jiken" (Japanese: ゲーム会社殺人事件)	Kazuo Nogami	N/A	April 14, 1997	—
Kogoro is invited to a party for the release of a game which stores himself. While there, Conan runs into a man who uses the alias Tequila and learns that he plans to meet with Gin and Vodka. Conan follows Tequila to the bathroom where an explosion occurs and kills the man. Conan investigates the explosion and realizes that it was a murder attempt but the wrong person was killed. Conan knocks Kogoro out and uses his voice changing bow tie to reveal what had happened. Conan reveals that Tequila and Nakajima Hideaki, one of the game designers, secretly exchanged suitcases. Conan reveals that the bomber is game designer Takeshita Hironobu and that Hideaki was his intended target. As evidence, Conan reveals that Hideaki's suitcase's key would fit into the suitcase Hironobu is holding since that is originally Hideaki's suitcase. Hironobu confesses and denounces Hideaki for having an affair with his wife. Conan asks Hideaki what he knows about Tequila's acquaintances only to learn that he always meets them in the cafe in the Apollo building. Conan heads there only to find out Gin and Vodka had cause an explosion to hide evidence of them being there.

== Notes ==
- ^Jp. The episode's numbering as followed in Japan
- ^Eng. The episode's numbering as followed by Funimation Entertainment
- ^1 hr. The episodes were aired as a single hour long episode in Japan
- ^B These episodes are part of the third season of Case Closed
