= List of The File of Young Kindaichi episodes =

The File of Young Kindaichi (金田一少年の事件簿, Kindaichi Shōnen no Jikenbo) is a Japanese mystery anime series adapted from the manga of the same name, also known as The Kindaichi Case Files. The series follows the crime solving adventures of a high school student, Hajime Kindaichi, the supposed grandson of the famous (fictional) private detective Kosuke Kindaichi. He is often accompanied by his friend Miyuki Nanase, and sometimes police inspector Isamu Kenmochi. The manga was written by Yōzaburō Kanari or Seimaru Amagi (depending on series) and illustrated by Fumiya Satō.

Produced by Toei Animation and directed by Daisuke Nishio, the anime adaptation of the original manga aired on YTV and other NNS affiliates between April 7, 1997, and September 11, 2000, spanning 148 episodes plus one special episode. In addition, two animated films were released on December 14, 1996, and August 21, 1999, respectively. Seven years after the conclusion of the TV anime, two new animated episodes were aired in Japan on November 12, 2007, and November 19, 2007, respectively.

On April 6, 2007, a DVD collector's box of Kindaichi was released by Warner Home Video to mark the 10th anniversary of airing of the original TV anime.

== Episode list ==
See also The Kindaichi Case Files Characters.

=== TV series (1997-2000) ===
The series consists of 148 episodes with each case spanning between 1 and 4 episodes. A double-length TV special was aired on October 13, 1997, between episodes 23 and 24.

Opening songs:

- 1. Confused Memories by Yuko Tsuburaya (eps 1-23)
- 2. Meet Again by Laputa (eps 24–42)
- 3. Kimi ga Iru Kara... (Because You...) by Yui Nishiwaki (eps 43–69)
- 4. Brave by Grass Arcade (eps 70–83)
- 5. Justice: Future Mystery by Miru Takayama with Two-Mix (eps 84–105)
- 6. Why? (Funky Version) by Color (eps 106–138)
- 7. Never Say Why, Never Say No by 566 (feat. Sayuri Nakano) (eps 139–148)

Ending songs:

- 1. Futari (Us) by Rie Tomosaka (eps 1–17)
- 2. Boo Bee Magic! by Sarina Suzuki (eps 18–29)
- 3. Mysterious Night by R-Orange (eps 30–42)
- 4. White Page by Platinum Peppers Family (eps 43–62)
- 5. Jeans by Ryoko Hirosue (eps 63–73)
- 6. Hateshinaku Aoi Sora wo Mita (I Saw An Endless Blue Sky) by Yui Nishiwaki (eps 74–87)
- 7. Believe Myself by New Cinema Tokage (eps 88–98)
- 8. Sink by Plastic Tree (eps 99–110)
- 9. Congracche (Congrats) by CASCADE (eps 111–128)
- 10. Ultrider by PENICILLIN (eps 129–147)
- 11. Kimi ga Iru Kara... (Because You...) by Yui Nishiwaki (ep 148)

No.	English Title Japanese Title	Original release date
1	"Seven Mysteries of Fudo High Murder Case File 1"; Transliteration: "Gakuen Nanafushigi Satsujin Jiken Fairu 1" (Japanese: 「学園七不思議殺人事件」ファイル1)	April 7, 1997
There is rumored to be seven mysterious murders in Fudo High School, although only six have been solved. High school student Hajime Kindaichi is invited by the Mystery Research Team leader, Ruiko Sakuragi to help her solve the seventh riddle. There is a threatening note from the "After-School Magician" that if the old school building is demolished, the school principal will be murdered. That night, the Mystery Club, along with the security officer, Ryozo Tachibana see a figure in a mask and then a body hung above a candle pentagram in the locked forbidden biology room, but when they reach the room, it is empty. However, the next morning, Sakuragi is found hung in the biology room in the same way as the unsolved seventh mystery. It is later revealed that she solved the last of the Seven Mysteries after she saw a corpse of a student from 10 years ago hidden within the walls. Hajime swears to solve the mystery.: First case: Ruiko Sakuragi was found hanged in the forbidden biology room at the old building of Fudo High School after she found out the seventh mystery when she discovered a corpse of a girl from 10 years ago hidden within the walls.; Main cast: Hajime Kindaichi, Miyuki Nanase, and Inspector Isamu Kenmochi. Case file cast: 3rd year students Ruiko Sakuragi (age 18), Makoto Makabe (age 18), Takahiro Onoue (age 18) and Tomoyo Takajima (age 18), 1st year student Ryuta Saki (age 16), physics teacher Yuichiro Matoba (age 60) and security officer Ryozo Tachibana (age 50).
2	"Seven Mysteries of Fudo High Murder Case File 2"; Transliteration: "Gakuen Nanafushigi Satsujin Jiken Fairu 2" (Japanese: 「学園七不思議殺人事件」ファイル2)	April 14, 1997
Inspector Isamu Kenmochi is assigned to investigate Sakuragi's death and Hajime explains what they saw. Yuichiro Matoba, the physics teacher suspects the culprit is a former teacher referred to as "M" who was rumored to conduct strange and horrifying rituals. Student writer Makoto Makabe proposes a plausible theory of how the murder was carried out, but Hajime believes there is a different scenario. Kenmochi tells Hajime how 10 years earlier, the Mystery Club member, Chihiro Aoyama, was investigating the seven mysteries but she suddenly disappeared. Meanwhile, student Takahiro Onoue has Sakuragi's data disc which contains a message about who the culprit may be, but as he decodes it, he is beaten to death with a wrapped up hammer by the "Magician" and his body is dragged to the printing room to coincide with one of the seven mysteries. When Hajime and his friend Miyuki Nanase read the Mystery Club's anthology, they find a copy of Sakuragi's notes inside, also stating that there were originally only six mysteries. Miyuki is attacked when she tries to remove a poster of Makabe on the wall in the old building of Fudo High School. Hajime then finds Miyuki badly injured beside the fountain in accordance with the third mystery.: Second case: Takahiro Onoue was found dead in the printing room at the old building of Fudo High School after he solves the code from Ruiko Sakuragi's data disc which contains a message about who the culprit is.; Third case: Hajime Kindaichi's childhood friend, Miyuki Nanase was attacked and brought to the bloody fountain when she was trying to take off Makoto Makabe's poster from the wall.
3	"Seven Mysteries of Fudo High Murder Case File 3"; Transliteration: "Gakuen Nanafushigi Satsujin Jiken Fairu 3" (Japanese: 「学園七不思議殺人事件」ファイル3)	April 21, 1997
Kenmochi tells Hajime that the old school building was formerly the property of Takahata Pharmaceuticals and that six of their experimental subjects died there. Later, Miyuki wakes up in the hospital after being attacked by the killer and encourages Hajime to continue his investigation despite the risks. He decodes Sakuragi's code and then finds the body of Chihiro Aoyama hidden in a wall cavity. Hajime calls everybody to the old school building and explains how the killer used a mirror to create the mystery of Sakuragi's murder. He then accuses physics teacher Yuichiro Matoba of the murders and being the "After-School Magician". He was left behind by the Takahata company to keep watch over the six bodies hidden for 30 years and was responsible for the accidental death of Chihiro Aoyama 10 years earlier after she found out about the deaths of the experimental subjects. Suddenly, security officer Ryozo Tachibana rushes forward and stabs and kills Matoba with scissors in revenge for the death of Chihiro whom he reveals was his daughter. Afterwards the police find the six bodies of the experimental subjects and the building is demolished on schedule. A funeral is also held for Chihiro Aoyama that Hajime attends and meets her for the first and last time.: Related cases: 30 years ago in 1967, six experimental volunteers at the Takahata Pharmaceuticals laboratory which was later donated to the old building of Fudo High School, died from malpractice and their bodies were buried underground and sealed under the concrete. One of the co-workers, Yuichiro Matoba guarded the bodies so they wouldn't get discovered by anyone. However, 10 years ago in 1987, a female student who was a member of the Mystery Research Club named Chihiro Aoyama, found out about the six bodies of the experimental subjects hidden in the old school building. When she tried to contact the police, she died from an accidental fall from the stairs. Matoba hid her in the walls and spread the rumor of the seventh mystery.; Another Death After Conclusion: The physics teacher, Yuichiro Matoba was stabbed to death with scissors by the security-in-charge Ryozo Tachibana in revenge for the death of Chihiro Aoyama 10 years ago who he reveals was his daughter and that he's her father, Ryozo Aoyama after the truth of the case is revealed by Hajime Kindaichi.
4	"Legend of Lake Hiren Murder Case File 1"; Transliteration: "Hirenko Densetsu Satsujin Jiken Fairu 1" (Japanese: 「悲恋湖伝説殺人事件」ファイル1)	April 28, 1997
Hajime and Miyuki go on a tour of the Hiren Lake Resort in place of his friend Shigeru Kikkawa where the participants stand to win a membership pass. While at the resort a news flash announces that Jason, an axe murderer has escaped from a nearby prison. The next morning, they discover that one of the group has been killed with an axe and the only bridge to the resort has been burned down. Company president Saburou Kayama decides to leave with a suitcase full of money, but he is also killed and the suitcase returned. Then, Miyuki is injured by a booby trap in the woods. Case file cast: 3rd year student Eiji Touno, 2nd year student Sayuri Kawanishi, university student Souchi Kurata, painter Seiji Kobayashi, freelance writer Yousuke Itsuki, company president Saburou Kayama and his wife Seiko Kayama, doctor Seisaku Kouda, tour conductor Shyoutarou Kujyou, and Shigeru Kikkawa a friend of Hajime.
5	"Legend of Lake Hiren Murder Case File 2"; Transliteration: "Hirenko Densetsu Satsujin Jiken Fairu 2" (Japanese: 「悲恋湖伝説殺人事件」ファイル2)	May 5, 1997
Hajime suspects the killer may be one of the members of the group itself. Eiji Touno leaves by boat to get help, but the boat returns with his body. That night, the artist Seiji Kobayashi is killed. Hajime discovers that all of the guests are survivors of the sinking of the Oriental ship that happened three years ago.
6	"Legend of Lake Hiren Murder Case File 3"; Transliteration: "Hirenko Densetsu Satsujin Jiken Fairu 3" (Japanese: 「悲恋湖伝説殺人事件」ファイル3)	May 12, 1997
Hajime realizes that the killer has been listening to the group via a hidden microphone and uses it to trap the killer who is revealed to be Eiji Touno. Touno had actually killed Shigeru Kikkawa and disguised the body as himself. Touno wanted revenge on the person with the initials "S.K." who had pushed his sister Keiko away from a full lifeboat during the sinking of the Oriental Cruise Disaster in a case of the Plank of Carneades. Touno escapes and drives a motor boat out onto the lake, who commits suicide by blowing up the boat and the lake turns red due to the sun setting. Later Yousuke Itsuki shows Hajime a photo of Eiji Touno with his sister Keiko Goizume who has a striking resemblance to Miyuki, revealing that he had been in love with his own sister.
7	"Castle of Wax Murder Case File 1"; Transliteration: "Rōningyōjō Satsujin Jiken Fairu 1" (Japanese: 「蝋人形城殺人事件」ファイル1)	May 19, 1997
Hajime and Miyuki take part in a mystery night held in an old castle which contains a wax museum. A mysterious Mr. Redrum has invited ten people involved in criminal investigation to participate with a chance to win ownership of the castle. Inside, the invitees find wax doll likenesses of themselves. That night, Megumi Toma the Toma Detective Agency President and her wax doll, are found stabbed in the back, with the only clue being the two cue balls she was holding. Case file cast: President of the Toma Detective Agency Megumi Toma, crime psychologist Richard Anderson, mystery novel critic Kusaburo Bando, National Police Inspector Kengo Akechi, and mystery novel writer, Kahoru Takigawa.
8	"Castle of Wax Murder Case File 2"; Transliteration: "Rōningyōjō Satsujin Jiken Fairu 2" (Japanese: 「蝋人形城殺人事件」ファイル2)	May 26, 1997
After the first murder, the guests find that they are isolated from the outside world, and that "redrum" is an anagram for "murder". Next, Richard Anderson, the crime psychologist is murdered and then the mystery novel critic, Kusaburo Bando, is found hanged with his doll along with a recording saying that it was he who killed Toma and Anderson. However, Hajime remains skeptical and accuses National Police Inspector Kengo Akechi as the murderer.
9	"Castle of Wax Murder Case File 3"; Transliteration: "Rōningyōjō Satsujin Jiken Fairu 3" (Japanese: 「蝋人形城殺人事件」ファイル3)	June 2, 1997
Hajime accuses Detective Akechi of being the murderer, but Akechi proves that he is not Redrum, and reveals that he is on the trail of a 30 year old crime. Hajime finds a ring in the fireplace and deduces that Redrum is actually the mystery novel writer, Kahoru Takigawa. She confesses to the murders because the three people she killed were responsible for the death of her lover, Kyoji Sayama, 29 years ago during a disagreement after the five of them carried out a large robbery.
10	"Gentleman Thief Killer File 1"; Transliteration: "Kaitō Shinshi no Satsujin Fairu 1" (Japanese: 「怪盗紳士の殺人」ファイル1)	June 9, 1997
Detective Kenmochi asks Hajime for help catching a phantom art thief, a so-called Kaitou Gentleman who leaves calling cards announcing his next target. He takes Hajime and Miyuki to the mansion of the master artist Gamou Gouzou. There, Hajime meets Sakura Izumi, a former school friend who has been declared Gouzou's heir based on a stolen painting of his daughter which was sent to an art competition by the Kaitou Gentleman. The painting is stolen and Sakura is assaulted and her hair cut and Hajime believes that it was done by one of the members of the group staying in the mansion. Meanwhile, Gouzou's lover, Dr. Satomi Kaitsu plans to poison Sakura but she is strangled to death and the portrait of her is stolen. Case file cast: master artist Gamou Gouzou, butler Komiyama, Sakura Izumi, Dr. Satomi Kaitsu, art magazine journalist Daigi Maki, butler Komiyama, ghost painter Nobuhiko Izumi, and Hajime's friend Itsuki.
11	"Gentleman Thief Killer File 2"; Transliteration: "Kaitō Shinshi no Satsujin Fairu 2" (Japanese: 「怪盗紳士の殺人」ファイル2)	June 16, 1997
The next night, the Kaitou Gentleman steals a painting of Gouzou fishing, and the next morning Gouzou is found dead beside the river, but everyone has an alibi. Hajime sets a trap for the thief and catches the Kaitou Gentleman who is disguised as the art magazine journalist Daigi Maki, but she denies committing the murders and escapes. The inclusion of the Southern Cross constellation in the painting of the daughter arouses Hijime's suspicions and he sends his friend Itsuki to investigate on the most southern island of Okinawa where the constellation can be seen from Japan.
12	"Gentleman Thief Killer File 3"; Transliteration: "Kaitō Shinshi no Satsujin Fairu 3" (Japanese: 「怪盗紳士の殺人」ファイル3)	June 23, 1997
Hajime thinks he has solved the case of the murders of Dr. Kaitsu and Gouzou. He believes that two people were involved and that they blamed the Kaitou Gentleman to deflect suspicion from themselves. He suggests that they first sent the portrait of the daughter to the exhibition to force Gouzou to admit that he had a daughter, which ushered Sakura into the mansion. However the painting had the Southern Cross in the night sky which meant that, it was not painted by Gouzou, but a ghost painter he employed in Okinawa. Dr. Kaitsu was his accomplice, but they crippled the painter with drugs and sent him to a hospital in Okinawa where he has since died. Hajime accuses Sakura of the murders, unknowingly assisted by the butler Komiyama. She admits that she did it because her father, Nobuhiko Izumi, was the ghost painter, however she takes her own life and confesses her feelings for Hajime before she can be arrested.
13	"Isle of Sadness Murder Case File 1"; Transliteration: "Hihōtō Satsujin Jiken Fairu 1" (Japanese: 「悲報島殺人事件」ファイル1)	June 30, 1997
Hajime and Miyuki participate in a treasure hunt on the Isle of Sadness (Hiho) in Kyushu organised by Daisuke Mimasaka. The others who are also participating are treasure hunters Asato Kakimoto, Ryuzo Yasojima, Kohei Himura, Hisayoshi Yaogi, Chris Einstein, the former butler Eisaku Iwata, Kyoko Kaya and Mimasaka's daughter Midori Mimasaka. Upon arrival at the island, they discover the decomposed body of Mimasaka, stuffed into a grandfather clock. The only clues are a Yamawara statue, a set of eight dolls, an old song whose lyrics are supposed to provide clues to the location of the treasure. In Tottori folklore, the Yamawara defends the treasure on the island and kills those who get close, hence the name of the island. The treasure hunters insist on continuing with the hunt and they discover that there is one extra guest who must be the killer. The next morning, Hajime notices a doll missing, and Asato Kakimoto is found dead in his lodge with blood splattered all over the floor, walls and ceiling, but everyone has an alibi.: First case: The owner of the Isle of Sadness (Hiho) Daisuke Mimasaka was found dead, stuffed into a grandfather clock shortly after everyone's arrival.; Second case: Asato Kakimoto was found dead in his lodge with blood splattered all over the floor, walls and ceiling.; Main cast: Hajime Kindaichi and Miyuki Nanase. Case file cast: Daisuke Mimasaka and his daughter Midori Mimasaka (age 17), treasure hunters Asato Kakimoto (age 43), Professor Kyosuke Saeki and his young son Koichiro Saeki (age 15), Ryuzo Yasojima (age 52), Kohei Himura, Hisayoshi Yaogi (age 42), Chris Einstein (age 13), police officer Kyoko Kaya and former butler Eisaku Iwata (age 65).
14	"Isle of Sadness Murder Case File 2"; Transliteration: "Hihōtō Satsujin Jiken Fairu 2" (Japanese: 「悲報島殺人事件」ファイル2)	July 7, 1997
Chris Einstein invites Hajime into investigate the black torii gateway where Hajime is injured after walking near a geyser. While being treated for his wounds, Hajime discovers that Mimasaka's daughter Midori was not favored by her father and she resented him. He also sees a photograph taken ten years earlier of the owners of the island which includes most of the treasure hunters including Professor Saeki and his young son Koichiro. After Saeki appeared to have died accidentally, everyone left the island to Mimasaka and departed. That night, Ryuzo Yasojima is killed when his lodge burns down. All guests have alibis except Kohei Himura, but he is shot a short while later after witnessing the true identity of the culprit. While at the onsen, Hajime finds a clue when he discovers that the red ochre on the island turns black on contact with water.: Third case: Ryuzo Yasojima was found dead after his lodge was burned down.; Fourth case: Kohei Himura was found dead after being shot to death when he saw something horrifying.
15	"Isle of Sadness Murder Case File 3"; Transliteration: "Hihōtō Satsujin Jiken Fairu 3" (Japanese: 「悲報島殺人事件」ファイル3)	July 14, 1997
Hajime realizes that the red torii referred to in the song would now appear black because of the geyser. However, Hisayoshi Yaogi has also solved the mystery and finds the location of the treasure, but when Hajime leads the others there, they find him dead. Hajime deduces that Midori Mimasaka is the killer, but she is in fact Koichiro Saeki, Professor Saeki's son. They enter the cavern containing the treasure of gold and jewels guarded by a huge Yamawara statue. Eisaku Iwata, the former butler, then prepares to shoot the remaining members of the group to keep the treasure for himself, but Kyoko Kaya shoots him in the shoulder and reveals that she is a police officer who has been chasing Iwata for suspected murder and insurance fraud. Iwata makes a grab for the gold which topples the statue, killing him and causing the cavern to collapse, burying the treasure in the process. Hajime saves Koichiro who reveals that he met Midori and how he had planned revenge against Mimasaka for the death of his father, but he fell in love with Midori, only for her to commit suicide over her father's actions. Later, Koichiro Saeki is arrested for his crimes. Although what was in Kyoko Kaya's box remains unknown.: Fifth case: Hisayoshi Yaogi was found dead at the cavern that leads to the treasure of gold and jewels guarded by a huge Yamawara statue.
16	"The Devil's Suite Murder Case File 1"; Transliteration: "Akuma Kumikyoku Satsujin Jiken Fairu 1" (Japanese: 「悪魔組曲殺人事件」ファイル1)	July 21, 1997
Michael Henry, the French executive member of the Toutou Philharmonic Orchestra, is found dead at the bottom of a staircase in the villa of Shuichiro Mido, composer of "The Devil's Suite" based on his three poems. The only clue is a key clasped in his hand. Hajime helps in the search to find the famed composer's lost work along with Inspector Akechi. Also present are the other orchestra committee members; conductor Takehiko Natsuoka, opera singer Yurie Kazekura and violinist Arisa Kure. Suddenly, Mido's manager Yuka Yamane finds Kazekura dead in the collector's room, her head covered by a helmet as described in Mido's poems. Meanwhile, they find a written copy of the poems comprising "The Devil's Suite" and Akechi gives it to Hajime to solve the mystery of the two deaths. Main cast: Hajime Kindaichi, Miyuki Nanase, and Super intendent Kengo Akechi. Case file cast: Executive member of the Toutou Philharmonic Orchestra Michael Henry, composer Shuichiro Mido, assistant Yozo Tsubaki, conductor Takehiko Natsuoka, opera singer Yurie Kazekura, violinist Arisa Kure, and Mido's manager Yuka Yamane.
17	"The Devil's Suite Murder Case File 2"; Transliteration: "Akuma Kumikyoku Satsujin Jiken Fairu 2" (Japanese: 「悪魔組曲殺人事件」ファイル2)	July 28, 1997
Following the plot of The Devil's Suite poems again, an arrow from the collector's room is fired at Arisa Kure. Akechi calls everyone together after finding a musical score in conductor Takehiko Natsuoka's room. Natsuoka admits that he took it from Michael Henry, but only after he was already dead. Hajime accuses Kure of being the murderer, because the French word for key which he held in his dying hand, "kle", sounds like "kure" in Japanese. He also accuses her of faking the attack by an arrow to deflect suspicion and accuses Tsubaki for complicity by hiding the bow in Natsuoka's room. Tsubaki tries to accept the blame for the murders, revealing that Kure is actually Shuichiro Mido's daughter even though he was very harsh with her. However, Kure confesses to the deaths, admitting that Michael's death was an accident which was witnessed by Kazekura who then planned to blackmail her. She then attempts to commit suicide by falling off a cliff, but Hajime and Tsubaki save her telling her that her father loves her. Kure is arrested for the murder of Michael Henry and Yurie Kazekura.
18	"Hida Mechanized House Murder Case File 1"; Transliteration: "Hida Karakuri Yashiki Satsujin Jiken Fairu 1" (Japanese: 「飛騨からくり屋敷殺人事件」ファイル1)	August 4, 1997
Hajime and Miyuki travel with Detective Isamu Kenmochi to Kuchinashi village in Okuhida (Hida region) of Gifu Prefecture after kenmochi received a letter from Shino, a childhood friend who married into the Tatsumi family as the second wife. She has been receiving death threats from the "Cursed Warrior" since her husband, Kuranosuke Tatsumi's death, when his will named Seimaru, Shino's son as his heir. They suspect Ryunosuske, Tatsumi's son is from his first wife, Ayako. The will is to take effect after the current Warrior Festival. Suddenly, someone dressed as Kaneharu, a samurai warrior attacks the house. Later, a man claiming to be Saburou Akanuma visits with his face covered and offers to reveal the identity of the Cursed Warrior at midnight. However, he is found dead in a locked room without a head. Shino says that Akanuma claimed to be Seimaru's twin whom she believed was stillborn. That night, while walking, Miyuki falls and is ambushed by a sword-wielding warrior. Case file cast: Detective Ossan Kenmochi; family head Kuranosuke Tatsumi; Ayako, Kuranosuke's first wife; Ryunosuske, son of Ayako; Shino, Kuranosuke's second wife; Seimaru, son of Shino; Saburou Akanuma who claims to be Seimaru's stillborn twin; family servant Senda Saruhiko; family physician Rintarou Fuyuki; Detective Kenmochi.
19	"Hida Mechanized House Murder Case File 2"; Transliteration: "Hida Karakuri Yashiki Satsujin Jiken Fairu 2" (Japanese: 「飛騨からくり屋敷殺人事件」ファイル2)	August 11, 1997
Hajime searches for Miyuki and finds her being carried by a warrior into the Samurai Temple. Meanwhile, Detective Kenmochi learns the legend of 400 years ago when General Kaneharu sought refuge in the village. The villagers agreed, but on the condition that Kaneharu was disposed of by his men. As he died, Kaneharu placed a curse on the village. Hajime and Miyuki are captured by the Cursed Warrior who displays Seimaru's severed head. Kenmochi deduces that the servant Senda Saruhiko killed Akanuma, but Saruhiko is later found dead after an old family gun misfires. With Seimaru and Saruhiko dead, Kuranosuke assumes the role of head of the family and the inheritance, and insists that Kenmochi, Hajime and Miyuki leave. They decide to stay at a hotel for a night, but return the next morning. Hajime realizes that Saruhiko could not have killed Akanuma, but he was probably duped into assisting the real killer who may be one of Kuranosuke Tatsumi's first three children; Ryunosuske, Moegi his daughter or Hayato his second son.
20	"Hida Mechanized House Murder Case File 3"; Transliteration: "Hida Karakuri Yashiki Satsujin Jiken Fairu 3" (Japanese: 「飛騨からくり屋敷殺人事件」ファイル3)	August 18, 1997
Hajime now concludes that Akanuma never existed and was a creation of the killer and Saruhiko. He states that Seimaru's body was disguised to look like Akanuma, and that Ryunosuske is really Shino's son, not Seimaru. Confronted by this evidence, Shino confesses that she knew Ayako in school and always resented her wealth. When they were both in hospital giving birth, Shino was unmarried and when she met Ayako in the hospital again she decided to switch their babies planning that her child would be raised as a Tatsumi. She says that she killed Seimaru whom she always hated because she saw Ayako in her son and despised Saruhiko whom she saw as greedy. However, Ryunosuske is just as ruthless as his mother, and he had already poisoned Shino's tea. That is when Hayato reveals himself as sane as he had faked being mentally disabled because Ryunosuke attempted to kill him via poisoning years ago. As she dies Shino still defends her real son Ryunosuske by saying that she poisoned herself.
21	"The Opera House Murder Case File 1"; Transliteration: "Operazakan Satsujin Jiken Fairu 1" (Japanese: 「オペラ座館殺人事件」ファイル1)	August 25, 1997
Miyuki asks Hajime to help out with drama club camp at an island Opera Hotel where a small group of students plan to re-enact the Phantom of the Opera. Eight students have already left the club after Fuyuko Tsukishima, the girl who was selected for the lead role, killed herself in front of the other members. She jumped from the roof of a hospital after her face was disfigured by acid. During dinner on the first night of the camp, the new lead actress, Orie Hidaka is murdered by a falling chandelier. They suspect a mystery guest named Kagetsu who arrived earlier covered in bandages. When Hajime and the others visit his room, they find it damaged and empty with a message "Burned in the flames of Hell" scrawled on the wall in blood. Main cast: Hajime Kindaichi and Miyuki Nanase. Case file cast: Drama Club teacher Ryoji Tsukishima, Opera Hotel owner Kazuma Kurosawa, Opera Hotel head chef Natsuyo Ogata, mystery guest Kagetsu. Drama students; Fuyuko Tsukishima, Orie Hidaka, Harumi Kiryu, Ryoko Saotome, Mitsuhiko Fuse, prop maker Yutaka Sendo, sound effect technician Shuichiro Kamiya.
22	"The Opera House Murder Case File 2"; Transliteration: "Operazakan Satsujin Jiken Fairu 2" (Japanese: 「オペラ座館殺人事件」ファイル2)	September 1, 1997
The club members begin to fear for their lives but cannot leave the island because of an approaching typhoon. The next morning, student Harumi Kiryu is found dead, hanged from a tree in an apparent suicide, but Hajime proves she was murdered. Then, after she almost discovers someone in the sound room of the theater, teacher Natsuyo Ogata is found dead in a bathtub, in a replay of the plot from Phantom of the Opera. However, Hajime deduces that she was murdered elsewhere and placed in the bathtub. Student Ryoko Saotome's reaction to another death prompts her to confess that she, Kiryu and Hidaka had accidentally caused Fuyuko's disfigurement. Hajime later finds Fuyuko's diary in the kitchen in which she wrote about loving "R". Suddenly someone wearing a phantom mask, apparently Kagetsu, attacks Saotome and Miyuki. When Hajime runs into the room Kagetsu jumps from the window into the ocean and apparently dies, but Hajime is suspicious. He realizes that it was a trick to make them believe Kagetsu died from the fall.
23	"The Opera House Murder Case File 3"; Transliteration: "Operazakan Satsujin Jiken Fairu 3" (Japanese: 「オペラ座館殺人事件」ファイル3)	September 8, 1997
Hajime believes he has discovered the killer's identity and calls everyone together. He explains that Kagetsu does not exist and how the murders were committed. Hajime tricks his suspect, Shuichiro Kamiya, into sitting in Saotome's seat because earlier Hajime had discovered a crossbow trap aimed at the seat. Kamiya suddenly jumps out of the seat when the clock strikes 12, revealing that he is the killer and planned to kill Saotome with the knife. He confesses that he and Fuyuko loved each other, referring to each other as Christine and Raoul ("R"), characters from the opera. After the couple overheard Hidaka, Kiryu and Saotome say they conspired to scare Fuyuko, the distraught Fuyuko committed suicide and so he sought revenge for her death. However, before he can be stopped, Kamiya runs to the roof and jumps, killing himself to be in heaven with Fuyuko.
SP	"Death God Hospital Murder Case"; Transliteration: "Shinigami Byōin Satsujin Jiken" (Japanese: 「死神病院殺人事件」)	October 13, 1997
Saburo Ogitani, the 43 year old head surgeon of Kiyomasa Hospital is killed and his head is crushed by a falling statue while holding a bell with a red ribbon. While Kenmochi is investigating the murder, Hajime is admitted to the hospital after overeating at a gyoza dumpling challenge and Kenmochi drags him off to help in the investigation. Hajime encounters the long term patient Junya Kine who says it is called "Death God Hospital". Later, Hajime and Myuki encounter the old woman Taki Mizushima who regularly visits the hospital and has a similar bell on her cane. Kine tell Hajime that her bell is the reminder of a doctor Akihito Kiyomasa who tried to save her son Kazuo 3 years ago by ringing a similar bell to help him regain consciousness. Kazuo actually died from the side effects of an experimental drug used at the hospital introduced by Head Doctor Tomoaki Kiyomasa. However, Akihito shouldered the guilt and committed suicide by jumping from a cliff, holding the bell, but his face was unrecognizable. During the night, Head Nurse Kazuko Takazawa is grabbed by a cloaked figure and later, Hajime and Miyuki encounter the same figure ringing a bell. Suddenly Head Nurse Kazuko Takazawa is thrown from a window and dies holding a bell. Hajime runs in and sees Tomoaki who denies involvement, but he subsequently finds clues to the killer's identity. Hajime calls everyone together, and explains that the murderer killed Ogitani and Takazawa with the intention of forcing Tomoaki to admit his malpractice and he accuses the youngest daughter, Eiko Kiyomasa of the murders. She admits that she blamed Ogitani, Takazawa and Tomoaki for Akihito's death and wanted them dead. They are interrupted by the news that Taki Mizushima is being brought to the hospital after she was hit by a car. The family operate to save her, and Eiko resists the temptation to kill Tomoaki. Afterwards, when Eiko is arrested, her fiancé Yuichi Yukimuro gives her a bell and promises to wait for her. During this double-length special episode, Inspector Akechi foils a plan by the Gentleman Thief to steal a masterpiece painting on the cruise ship Queen Angelica while sailing the Atlantic Ocean. Case file cast: Alcoholic Hospital Chief Keltaro Kiyomasa, his eldest son Head Doctor Tomoaki Kiyomasa, eldest daughter Kimiko Kiyomasa, young son Doctor Akihito Kiyomasa, young daughter Nurse Eiko Kiyomasa, Head Nurse Kazuko Takazawa, Doctor Yuichi Yukimuro and fiancé of Eiko, patient and journalist Junya Kine, old woman Taki Mizushima.
24	"Kindaichi the Killer File 1"; Transliteration: "Kindaichi Shōnen no Satsujin Fairu 1" (Japanese: 「金田一少年の殺人」ファイル1)	October 20, 1997
The popular author Goryu Tachibana throws a party at his villa in Karuizawa where he declares that the person who successfully cracks his code will have the rights to publish his next book, a non-fiction book which will expose the name and crimes of somebody present. Akira Kamoshita of Otoba Publishing House asks Hajime to attend, however during the party Tachibana harasses Miyuki and when Hajime intervenes, he accidentally removes Tachibana's hairpiece and the writer punches Hajime and immediately excludes Otoba Publishing from competing. Later, Hajime goes to apologize, but he is found with the body of Tachibana who had been bludgeoned to death with a blunt object by someone who also knocked Hajime unconscious. Nagano Prefectural Police Inspector Shigeru Nagashima concludes that all the evidence points to Hajime who is then arrested for Tachibana's murder against Inspector Kenmochi's advice. However, Hajime escapes police custody and attempts to find the killer himself. Main cast: Hajime Kindaichi, Miyuki Nanase, Inspector Isamu Kenmochi, Super intendent Kengo Akechi, Yosuke Itsuki and Ryuji Saki. Case file cast: Author Goryu Tachibana (age 50), Hiyaku Publishing Company President Kon Omura (age 40), Kamidakawa Publishing Company Editor Wataru Tokito (age 24), manga writer Ohei Katsura (age 39), Freelance Editor Nonaka Tomomi (age 26), Otoba Publishing Company Editor Akira Kamoshita (age 28), Cameraman Kiyonori Hariu (age 40), Kyokuto Television Station newscaster Tetsuo Tsuzuki (age 52), Tachibana family maids Natsume and Aoi Hanamura (age 17), and 2nd year Fudo High School student Hajime Kindaichi (age 17).
25	"Kindaichi the Killer File 2"; Transliteration: "Kindaichi Shōnen no Satsujin Fairu 2" (Japanese: 「金田一少年の殺人」ファイル2)	October 27, 1997
Hajime suspects Kon Omura from Hiyaku Publishing may have Tachibana's manuscript. However, after directing Hajime to Wataru Tokito, Omura is murdered with a golf club. Hajime then follows Tokito to a construction site and questions him, but after he directs Hajime to Katsura, someone causes steel beams to fall and kill him. Hajime is still on the run from the police, which now includes Superintendent Akechi, but the television newscaster Tetsuo Tsuzuki shelters him. Hajime then goes to question the manga writer Ohei Katsura, who directs him to Nonaka Tomomi before Katsura is stabbed from behind and killed. Hajime is again suspected of the murder. However, he begins to suspect that the individual messages that Tachibana told each of the publishers directing them to other participants may be a type of code. Hajime's friends are still secretly supporting him.
26	"Kindaichi the Killer File 3"; Transliteration: "Kindaichi Shōnen no Satsujin Fairu 3" (Japanese: 「金田一少年の殺人」ファイル3)	November 3, 1997
Hajime is on the run, now wanted for four murders, and he is sheltered by Cameraman Kiyonori Hariu who gives Hajime photos of the murder scenes and blueprints of Tachibana's villa. Hajime heads back to Karuizawa with Inspector Shigeru Nagashima in pursuit and Hajime jumps from the train into a river to escape. He is found and taken in by Aoi Hanamura who feels sorry for him. Hajime locates Nonaka at the nearby Yunosawa Hotel, but it is a trap laid by Akechi and Nagashima. However Hajime sees Nonaka leave by a side door, lured by a false message. Hajime warns her to be careful, but she is later attacked and killed by the true culprit. Before he runs away, Hajime scribbles a note for Akechi and runs into the kitchen of the hotel. Appearing desperate, Hajime takes a woman hostage at knifepoint and Akechi shoots him and Hajime falls to the ground unconscious. In the ambulance, Hajime reveals to his friends that his message asked Akechi to shoot him with a blank bullet and he then spread tomato juice on his shirt when Akechi shot him in order to deceive and catch the real culprit. They all travel to Tachibana's villa where Hajime reviews the evidence.
27	"Kindaichi the Killer File 4"; Transliteration: "Kindaichi Shōnen no Satsujin Fairu 4" (Japanese: 「金田一少年の殺人」ファイル4)	November 10, 1997
Hajime believes that he has identified the killer, and lies in wait with his friends and the police in Tachibana's room. Later, a masked man walks in to recover the hidden manuscript and is captured. Hajime explains that the key to the code was the names of the invitees to the party which suggested that the data disc containing the manuscript was hidden in the grandfather clock and they find it there. Hajime also explains how the killer was able to exit Tachibana's room without leaving footprints in the mud outside. He then reveals Tetsuo Tsuzuki as the killer of five people; Goryu Tachibana, Kon Omura, Wataru Tokito, Ohei Katsura and Nonaka Tomomi. Tsuzuki confesses, saying that he did it for his 10-year-old daughter Mizuho who has kidney failure. He donated one of his kidneys to save her, but the hospital bungled the operation and the transplant was a failure. In desperation to save his daughter, he smuggled organs for a crime boss, but Tachibana found out and was going to expose him using his new manuscript. Suddenly, Tsuzuki commits suicide by stabbing himself in the stomach and makes his last request for his remaining kidney to be given to his daughter. Afterwards Mizuho is revealed to have a successful operation and that Itsuki has decided to adopt her, promising to tell her everything once she's older.
28	"Ghost Ship Murder Case File 1"; Transliteration: "Yūrei Kyakusen Satsujin Jiken Fairu 1" (Japanese: 「幽霊客船殺人事件」ファイル1)	November 17, 1997
Inspector Kenmochi takes Hajime and Miyuki on the Cobalt Marine, not a cruise ship, but a cargo freighter with accommodation to Okinawa. Meanwhile, Captain Kozo Takamori has received a letter from a Ghost Captain stating that the cruise of death has begun. Takamori asserts that it was sent by one of the disgruntled crew members and accuses the Navigator Mikihiko Wakaouji. When Hajime is ill the next morning he discovers that Second Mate Joji Mizuzaki and female crew member Yoko Katori are romantically involved. Also, Captain Takamori appears to have disappeared although when they enter his locked room it appears that he was just eating breakfast. A passenger and reporter for a ship magazine Yoshikazu Akai suggests it is just like on the Mary Celeste. The crew then discover the communications equipment has been destroyed. Hajime calculates the time that the person responsible for the captain's disappearance left his room and checks everyone's alibis but the results are inconclusive. Case file cast: Captain Kozo (Kousou) Takamori, Navigator Mikihiko Wakaouji, Chief Engineer Kentaro Otsuki, Second Mate Joji Mizuzaki, Third Mate Tatsuya Kanou, crew member Yoko Katori, ship magazine reporter Yoshikazu Akai and passengers Yu Tokihara, Takashi Osawa and Akira Yoshida.
29	"Ghost Ship Murder Case File 2"; Transliteration: "Yūrei Kyakusen Satsujin Jiken Fairu 2" (Japanese: 「幽霊客船殺人事件」ファイル2)	November 24, 1997
Kenmochi discovers that Captain Takamori and Navigator Wakaouji as well as several of the other crew members were commanding officers on the Oriental cruise ship which sank after colliding with an oil tanker 3 years earlier. They were rivals but the collision ruined both their careers forcing them to pilot their current ship. That night, Wakaouji is poisoned and his body is thrown overboard. They find a suicide note in Morse code saying he had terminal cancer and that he killed Takamori and Mizuzaki. However when they rush to Mizuzaki's station in the wheel-house, they find Kanou dead there instead, poisoned from the booby trapped steering wheel. Mizuzaki had apparently slept in that morning. Meanwhile, passenger Yu Tokihara decides to commit suicide and jumps from the ship, sending her regards to the Ghost Captain. However, Hajime jumps in to save her.
30	"Ghost Ship Murder Case File 3"; Transliteration: "Yūrei Kyakusen Satsujin Jiken Fairu 3" (Japanese: 「幽霊客船殺人事件」ファイル3)	December 1, 1997
Mizuzaki jumps into the water and saves Hajime and Tokihara, then takes control of the ship. They come across an island, and row ashore to seek help. Reporter Yoshikazu Akai becomes separated from the others and thinks he sees the captain, but it is a ploy and he is pushed off the cliff to his death. After they return to the ship, Hajime reviews all the evidence and asserts that the killer is Chief Engineer Kentaro Otsuki. Otsuki takes Mizuzaki hostage in the wheelhouse, however an alarm sounds as the ship is heading towards a reef. At the last minute, the ship is diverted, revealing someone else has the ability to control the ship.
31	"Ghost Ship Murder Case File 4"; Transliteration: "Yūrei Kyakusen Satsujin Jiken Fairu 4" (Japanese: 「幽霊客船殺人事件」ファイル4)	December 8, 1997
Hajime now accuses the young crew member Yoko Katori of being the killer, saying that Kentaro Otsuki grabbing Mizuzaki was part of his plan to expose her. He reveals that Takamori, Wakaouji, Kanou and Akai were all involved in the sinking of the Oriental Cruise Ship, and that Katori and Tokihara were somehow related to the victims of the incident. Yu Tokihara admits that she wanted revenge because she witnessed Wakaouji attack her husband to save himself. However, she could not kill him, and after he apparently committed suicide she no longer had a reason to live. Yoko Katori says that Akai's article about the Oriental Cruise Incident alleged that her father, the captain of the oil tanker, was drunk and all the blame was pushed onto him for the collision, but she maintains that he did not drink. Hajime then explains how Yoko committed the murders. Suddenly, Mizuzaki breaks down and admits that he was also on the Oriental Cruise Ship, and was responsible for the collision because he and all the other crew members abandoned their post and joined Captain Wakaouji at a party. Wakaouji, Takamori and Kanou then lied to cast the blame on the oil tanker captain to save themselves and their careers. Yoko is arrested for the murders, however her father's name is finally cleared. Mizuzaki and Yoko however still love each other, and he promises to marry her on her eventual release from prison.
32	"Murderous Intent Below −15 °C"; Transliteration: "Hyōtenka Jūgodo no Satsui" (Japanese: 「氷点下15度の殺意」)	December 15, 1997
Hajime and Miyuki join the Fudo Ski Club's special training although Hajime is poor at skiing. That night, Hajime finds Shiramine beaten and buried in the snow, however the injuries are not serious. CCTV footage shows the culprit hitting Shiramine with what appears to be a set of skis in a bag, but Hajime deduces that it was frozen towels as the skis are locked up at night. Based on the CCTV footage and Suzumori's actions, Hajime accuses Emi Suzumori of attacking Shiramine. She breaks down and admits she did it because she believes that Shiramine deliberately sabotaged Shibusawa's skis which caused him to have a debilitating accident. However, Shibusawa regains consciousness from his coma and tells Suzumori that Shiramine is not to blame because he adjusted his skis himself. The Fudo Ski Club goes on to win the competition, but without the help of Hajime who still cannot ski. Case file cast: Members of the Fudoh Ski Club, Shiramine, Shibusawa, Emi Suzumori.
33	"Magical Express Murder Case File 1"; Transliteration: "Majutsu Ressha Satsujin Jiken Fairu 1" (Japanese: 「魔術列車殺人事件」ファイル1)	January 12, 1998
Hajime, Miyuki and Detective Kenmochi board a sleeper train for the Sequestrum Plain Motel in Hokkaido after the police receive a threatening letter from the self-named " The Puppeteer from Hell". On board the train, they are entertained by members of the Fantasy Magic Team. They receive a phone call warning from the Puppeteer that a bomb will explode on the train in 20 minutes. The train stops and everyone exits the train, however the leader of the magic team and Yumi's husband, Fumio Yamagami is missing. Akechi arrives because he is a fan of the magician team, and the bomb goes off, but it only distributes rose petals. Another phone message directs them to the body of Yamagami. They flee his cabin as set of small explosions go off, but then find his body has been removed. Everyone checks into the motel, but a little while later Yamagami's body is discovered and he is strung up like a marionette in the room of a mysterious masked guest, Mario Totsune. Case file cast: Fumio Yamagami and his wife Yumi Yamagami, Childe Yurama, Sakonji, Satomi Zanma, Sakuraba, Yoichi Takato and Hijime's friend Saki.
34	"Magical Express Murder Case File 2"; Transliteration: "Majutsu Ressha Satsujin Jiken Fairu 2" (Japanese: 「魔術列車殺人事件」ファイル2)	January 19, 1998
The mysterious masked guest Mario Totsune has apparently left, however the hotel is surrounded by swamp and there is no way out except by train. Akechi explains that the famous magician Reiko Chikamiya died 5 years earlier during a magic rehearsal in the same venue, and the magic of the Fantasy Magic Team is mostly her creation, but the "Living Puppet" show was created after her death. Childe Yurama insists the magic performance proceeds with him as the new leader, angering Yumi Yamagami. On his way to the performance on an island stage, Hajime accidentally breaks the drawbridge mechanism. During the performance of the Living Puppet, Hajime again receives a phone call from the Puppeteer and after a blackout, the body of Yurama has replaced the Living Puppet on stage. Hajime reasons that because the drawbridge is still up, the killer must still be on the island. That night, someone wearing a clown mask abducts Miyuki. Hajimi follows him, but it is revealed to be a trap and becomes caught in the swamp and sinks below the surface.
35	"Magical Express Murder Case File 3"; Transliteration: "Majutsu Ressha Satsujin Jiken Fairu 3" (Japanese: 「魔術列車殺人事件」ファイル3)	January 26, 1998
Hajime is rescued from the bottomless swamp and Akechi reveals that Yurama was killed some time before his body was left on stage. He states that Reiko Chikamiya's death was not an accident, and that when she fell, a vase of red roses was also smashed. However, her notebook with details of her magic tricks and ideas was never found. He believes that the killer is avenging Chikamiya's death. Kenmochi tells everyone that Yurama was killed by someone who knows the living puppet trick pointing to Yumi and Sakonji, but Sakonji says there is no proof either of them killed Yamagami. That night they hear a scream from Yumi's room, but when the crash in through the locked door, they find her dead, hanging from a tree outside. When they check the room below, Hajime asserts that he has found the identity of the Puppeteer who knows that Chikamiya's former students, Yamagami, Yumi, Yurama and Sakonji killed her to obtain her Magic Notebook.
36	"Magical Express Murder Case File 4"; Transliteration: "Majutsu Ressha Satsujin Jiken Fairu 4" (Japanese: 「魔術列車殺人事件」ファイル4)	February 2, 1998
Hajime calls everyone together believing he has solved the murders. He explains that the killer used a large piece of jade in Yumi's room as a counterweight to help him descend from the room through the window. This indicates the killer is lighter than Yumi, implicating Yoichi Takato. Hajime also explains that Takato sent Yamagami's body to the hotel as baggage addressed to himself as Mario Totsune. Confronted with the evidence, Totsune confesses to the elaborate scheme and reveals that he is the only son of Reiko Chikamiya. He was raised by his father and only saw Chikamiya twice, but was fascinated by magic, and only found out she was his mother after his father's death and saw her Magic Notebook. After seeing the Living Puppet act and their other tricks, he realized the team also had a copy of Chikamiya's notes and later when he became the manager, he overheard them reveal their involvement in her death. Sakonji confirms the story and gives Takato his copy of the notebook. Takato is taken away by the police, however he knows a trap is already set. A few weeks later, when Sakonji performs a new death-defying act, he is killed because Chikamiya wrote an intentional flaw into her notebook. With Sakonji's death, Takato escapes from prison with Hajime vowing to catch him in his grandfather's name.
37	"Legend of Snow Demon Murder Case File 1"; Transliteration: "Yukiyasha Densetsu Satsujin Jiken Fairu 1" (Japanese: 「雪夜叉伝説殺人事件」ファイル1)	February 2, 1998
Miyuki convinces Hajime to join her on a trip to a village in Hokkaido to help with the filming of a TV show. They stay at the villa of the reclusive artist Isen Himuro and then drive in a mini-van to the annex across the river to set up a video camera system. The annex is now a 20 minute drive away after the bridge collapsed. When they return, Hajime is surprised to find Kenmochi and Akechi in the village after their vehicle broke down. While watching the remote camera images in the annex, a Snow Demon appears and kills actress Rie Kano with an axe. The figure then turns and destroys the surveillance camera. Some villagers tell the story of the Snow Demon, how the poor area was known for human trafficking. Apparently during a snow storm, a woman in bondage escaped with her baby, but no-one would shelter her, fearing revenge from the traffickers, not even her former family. The baby died and the woman disappeared after leaving a curse on the village, creating the Snow demon. Suddenly, the assistant Marina Ayatsuji discovers the body of the main suspect, cameraman Michio Akashi stuffed inside a snowman, clutching some straw. Akechi determines that he was killed before Kano, and thus could not be the killer. Case file cast: artist and owner of the villa Isen Himuro, film director Hiruta, actress Reika Hayami, actress Rie Kano, actor Ken Munakata, actor Yusaku Daimon, cameraman Michio Akashi, audio engineer Hibiki Shiro, assistant Marina Ayatsuji.
38	"Legend of Snow Demon Murder Case File 2"; Transliteration: "Yukiyasha Densetsu Satsujin Jiken Fairu 2" (Japanese: 「雪夜叉伝説殺人事件」ファイル2)	February 9, 1998
With Akashi, the main suspect dead, Hajime is forced to go through everyone's alibis again, but the results are inconclusive. When Hajime questions why Himuro covers his face, Miyuki explains that he was among the few survivors of an airplane which crashed into a nearby mountain 10 years earlier. While again watching video footage of Kano's death at the annex, Hajime notices that the self-portrait of Himuro was gone when they arrived, presumably taken by the person posing as the Snow Demon. Hajime and the others drive to the annex and discover the self-portrait has been replaced by another painting. He also discovers evidence that someone has used a rope to cross the river, meaning the annex can be reached within 5 minutes from the main villa. Meanwhile Akechi receives information that the three people who reported the airplane crash were Kano, Hiruta and Akashi. Hajime, Akechi and Kenmochi rush to director Hiruta's room but find him already dead. Akechi gathers everyone together, except Himuro whom he believes is an impostor. He asserts that Himuro actually died in the crash, and Hiruta and the others found a stand-in for Himuro, planning to make money from selling his paintings. Akechi and the others burst into Himuro's locked room and find him dead, apparently from a drug overdose. They find a suicide letter confessing to the murders and that his real name is Takau Mizunuma. It explains that when he and the others came upon the crash site, they buried Himuro's body and decided to impersonate him and share his fortune, however later Mizunuma decided to keep the money himself. The case appears closed, but Hajime is still suspicious.
39	"Legend of Snow Demon Murder Case File 3"; Transliteration: "Yukiyasha Densetsu Satsujin Jiken Fairu 3" (Japanese: 「雪夜叉伝説殺人事件」ファイル3)	February 16, 1998
Hajime is intent on finding the real culprit even though everyone considers the case closed. He suggests that one of the airplane crash survivors changed their name and is seeking revenge. Hajime proves that Marina Ayatsuji was able to commit the murders and she eventually confesses. She reveals to them that she was involved in the airplane crash when she was 10 years old and that her real name is Marina Kuze. She reveals that when she survived the crash, she had vainly tried to help her trapped mother. She had spotted and asked Kano, Akashi, Hiruta and Mizunuma to help her when they arrived, but they refused. She blamed them for the death of her mother and wanted revenge. As she is being taken away she thanks Hajime for exposing the truth.
40	"Tarot Lodge Murder Case File 1"; Transliteration: "Tarotto Sansō Satsujin Jiken Fairu 1" (Japanese: 「タロット山荘殺人事件」ファイル1)	March 2, 1998
Hajime is invited by the pop idol Reika Hayami to her father's Tarot Villa in the snowy mountains to where she has retreated and refuses to see anyone. Coincidentally, a skier called Kenji Tsuji seeks shelter after returning late and finding the cable car switched off. In the villa is a framed panel of tarot cards and Reika's father explains that the former owner had an interest in tarot cards, so he framed them as a feature. Reporter Annryo Hojo mentions that one card is upside down. Reporter Goro Itami tells about a case he reported on 15 years ago when 2 children were kidnapped and their father killed, and how police accidentally shot a bystander instead of a robber. Later Itami tries to extort money from Yuichiro Hayami and demands to spend a night with Reika. Hayami angrily refuses and hits Itami with an ash tray, killing him and then he hastily buries the body. The next morning, all the tarot cards have been removed, and the Wheel of Fortune card appears pinned to Itami's door. Hajime believes it indicates Windmill Hill, so everyone travels there in the cable car and they find Itami's body tied to the windmill. When they return, the telephone lines are down, and the cable car controls have been smashed. Hajime investigates, while Hayami begins to panic about who had dug up Itami's body, tied it to the windmill and left the tarot card. Case file cast: Pop idol Reika Hayami, her father Yuichiro Hayami, servant Inoue, director of the talent agency Mitsuhiko Akama and assistant Takuya Kojo, reporters Annryo Hojo and Goro Itami, idol fan Taro Takashita and a lost skier Kenji Tsuji.
41	"Tarot Lodge Murder Case File 2"; Transliteration: "Tarotto Sansō Satsujin Jiken Fairu 2" (Japanese: 「タロット山荘殺人事件」ファイル2)	March 9, 1998
Hayami receives an intercom call from the person who dug up Itami's body who requests that he kill Akama. Meanwhile, a drunken Akama pressures Reika to keep him on as her agent and follow his orders, but she becomes frightened. Hayami follows Akama into the balneary (Note: A room for bathing.) and electrocutes him. Hearing a scream, everyone runs to the balneary to find Akama dead and the Tower of Power down tarot card indicating an unexpected disaster. Because of his erratic behavior, Hajime begins to suspect Hayami. Hayami receives another call from the Tarot Card killer who says he plans to kill Hajime, but he kills Hayami instead, leaving him hanging in his room in an apparent suicide, with the Hanged Man tarot card upside down. The remainder of the cards are also found in his room. Hajime suspects murder and he believes Hayami killed Itami and suspects that it has to do with the cases Itami mentioned earlier, although Hajime suspects a mastermind is behind all the murders. While looking at the Hayami family photo album, Hajime discovers a clue to the killer. While investigating, Hajime is knocked unconscious and wakes up later at Windmill Hill. Almost freezing to death, Hajime burns the jumper that Miyuki knitted for him to unfreeze the windmill and uses the cable car to return to the villa.
42	"Tarot Lodge Murder Case File 3"; Transliteration: "Tarotto Sansō Satsujin Jiken Fairu 3" (Japanese: 「タロット山荘殺人事件」ファイル3)	March 16, 1998
Hajime calls everyone together and states that the tarot cards will reveal the killer who does not know the correct position of all the tarot cards. When Takuya Kojo guesses the wrong position of the Hanged Man card Hajime accuses him of being the so-called Tarot Card killer. Kojo initially denies his involvement, but then confesses that he planned everything because he was one of the kidnapped children 15 years ago. Hayami was the kidnapper who killed his father, and Reika is his sister is whose real name was Azusa, but Hayami raised her as his own daughter. Kojo only decided to kill Akama because of the agent's evil nature. Horrified by this revelation, Reika runs out into the snow and is almost caught by an avalanche, but Kojo sacrifices himself to save her. Later, Reika realizes that Miyuki loves Hajime and decides not to compete for his love.
43	"Black Butterfly of Death Murder Case File 1"; Transliteration: "Kokushichō Satsujin Jiken Fairu 1" (Japanese: 「黒死蝶殺人事件」ファイル1)	April 13, 1998
Touno Eiji is supposed to be dead, killed in a fiery wreck following the serial killings at Nagano's Lake (Episode 4), however Yousuke Itsuki sees an article which shows him still alive and working with Shimon Madarame who claims to have resurrected rare extinct butterflies and plans to display them at Kanazawa. When they arrive at Kanazawa they meet Hajime's uncle Heiske and his daughter Fumi Kindaichi. Fumi travels with them to the Madarame residence, known as Butterfly Manor. Madarame introduces his three daughters named after butterflies: Tateha, Ageha and Ruri. During the party, Ruri sees a live Black Butterfly pinned to a wall – a premonition of death. The highlight of the evening is the release of luminous butterflies, meanwhile, Hajime thinks he sees Touno, but he introduces himself as Miyama. The next day, a purple butterfly is pinned to a tree and it has the same design as Ruri's kimono. Hajime searches for Ruri and finds her dead in the garden in an area known as the butterfly's grave. Officer Inokawa arrives to investigate the murder. Case file cast: Butterfly breeder Shimon Madarame, his wife Midori and daughters Tateha Ageha, Ruri, Tateha's fiancee Masayuki Onodera, servant Yamano Katsunori, assistant Yamano Katsunori, Professor Kazuma Rokuhara, Miyama Hikage and Officer Inokawa.
44	"Black Butterfly of Death Murder Case File 2"; Transliteration: "Kokushichō Satsujin Jiken Fairu 2" (Japanese: 「黒死蝶殺人事件」ファイル2)	April 20, 1998
Officer Inokawa checks everyone's alibis for the time Ruri's body was placed on the butterfly grave and only Miyama has no alibi, so he is taken in for questioning. Yamano Katsunori sees a Black Butterfly and tells the fearful story of a woman whose husband was killed by the village head's son who then took her as his wife. She bore three beautiful girls, but they all committed suicide and she placed a curse on the village. Days later, four Undying Butterflies appeared at the village head's house, and his family and the villagers began dying from some mysterious unknown disease. That night the luminous butterflies lead everyone to Tateha's body, strung up like a butterfly. Later, Hajime asks Miyama Hikage his real name because he knows the words Miyama and Hikage are names of butterflies. Miyama says he has amnesia and was found unconscious and seriously burned in Kanazawa's mountain forest 6 months ago. Madarame took him in because Miyama had a butterfly-shaped burn scar on his back. Hajime suspects Miyama may be Eiji Touno, however he has no motive. Hajime suspects the murders relate to events of 25 years ago when Shimon discovered the luminous butterflies and Midori's lover Minoru Suga committed suicide. Suddenly, Ageha screams as she is surrounded by venomous spiders in the balneary.
45	"Black Butterfly of Death Murder Case File 3"; Transliteration: "Kokushichō Satsujin Jiken Fairu 3" (Japanese: 「黒死蝶殺人事件」ファイル3)	April 27, 1998
Miyama arrives at the balneary first and finds Ageha bleeding from cuts on her legs and there is another message from the killer. They discover through her blood type that 25 year old Ageha cannot be the daughter of both Shimon and Midori. Later that day, Shimon is killed and also hung on the wall like a butterfly. Hajime questions Yamano Katsunori about 25 years ago when his assistant was Minoru Suga and the wealthy Shimon Madarame provided funding for butterfly research. Minoru Suga committed suicide on the eve of the announcement of the discovery of the luminous butterflies. Hajime suspects those events and the current murders are linked. That night Miyama and Ageha attempt to leave together but are stopped by Officer Inokawa. Hajime explains that Miyama is not the murderer who is still among them.
46	"Black Butterfly of Death Murder Case File 4"; Transliteration: "Kokushichō Satsujin Jiken Fairu 4" (Japanese: 「黒死蝶殺人事件」ファイル4)	May 11, 1998
Hajime explains that the killer cleverly delayed the discovery of Ruri's body to create an alibi, and used the scents which attract and repel the Black Butterflies to cover his movements. He then accuses Masayuki Onodera of being the murderer Undying Butterfly. Hajime explains that the killings are retribution for the suicide of Minoru Suga and suspects that Onodera is the biological son of Minoru Suga and Midori. Onodera admits his guilt, blaming Midori for betraying his father and revealing the discovery of the luminous butterfly pupae to Shimon Madarame. However, Midori denies the accusation, saying that she loved Suga, and that her three girls were his through artificial insemination, a fact that she was planning to reveal when Madarame was in his deathbed as revenge for what he did to Suga Minoru. Confronted by the truth, Onodera fatally stabs himself. Midori rushes to his side, then she sets the building on fire to die with her son. After they escape the scientist Yamano reveals that he always knew that Suga Minoru was the one who had discovered the Legendary Luminous Butterfly, but he in his excitement told Madarame about this. Revealing himself to be the one who had told Shimon Madarame about the discovery causing him to steal the credit for discovering the butterfly. He states he had no ill intentions he just wanted to save the Lab with the funding he received from Madarame he had no idea it would lead to such calamity. In the end Suga Minoru is rightfully given credit for discovering the Luminous Butterfly, and Miyama and Ageha get married with Hajime stating that Touno Eiji died that day in the lake.
47	"The Kidnapping of Reika Hayami Murder Case File 1"; Transliteration: "Hayami Reika Yūkai Satsujin Jiken Fairu 1" (Japanese: 「速水玲香誘拐殺人事件」ファイル1)	May 18, 1998
Following a day of shooting for a film, Reika Hayami and her manager Yasuyuki Yasuoga are kidnapped by someone calling himself the Puppet Clown. The kidnapper demands a huge ransom from the film director Youko Kafuraki and the ransom note also specifies that Hajime Kindaichi must deliver the money. Director Youko Kafuraki refuses to pay the ransom, so Veteran actress Reiko Mitamura offers to pay herself. Inspector Isamu Kenmochi appears in disguise, having been secretly called by Kafuraki. Hajime is told to take the money to a phone booth at Nakahara Station, but when he gets there he receives another phone call with a cryptic message to find the next location. Case file cast: Actress Reika Hayami, film director Youko Kafuraki, company manager Yasuyuki Yasuoga, secretary of production Kosawa Hidenari, veteran actress Reiko Mitamura, makeup clerk and wife of Yasuyuki Yasuoga, Ayaka Yasuoga, and production staff Naomi Sakai.
48	"The Kidnapping of Reika Hayami Murder Case File 2"; Transliteration: "Hayami Reika Yūkai Satsujin Jiken Fairu 2" (Japanese: 「速水玲香誘拐殺人事件」ファイル2)	May 25, 1998
Hajime goes from location to location following the instructions from the Puppet Clown, injuring himself in the process. However as he crosses a rope suspension bridge he falls and loses all the money and is rescued by Kenmochi who had been following him. With the failure of the ransom payment, the Puppet Clown kills Manami Yasuoga and shoots at Reika Hayami. Later he calls Hajime and tells him that the deal is off and that he has killed his victims and dumped their bodies. Hajime deduces the possible location of the bodies at Kawaguchi Lake at Yamanashi, and the police carry out a search there. On the way to Yamanashi, Hajime finds Reika alive and badly beaten on the side of the road.
49	"The Kidnapping of Reika Hayami Murder Case File 3"; Transliteration: "Hayami Reika Yūkai Satsujin Jiken Fairu 3" (Japanese: 「速水玲香誘拐殺人事件」ファイル3)	June 1, 1998
Reika is who has been badly beaten is found alive and taken to a hospital. After she regains consciousness, she relates the story of the kidnapping by the Puppet Clown who appears to have mysophobia, and the murder of Yasuoga. Suspecting that something is suspicious about Youko Kafuraki's company and the relationships between the staff, Hajime asks his friend Itsuki to investigate. Meanwhile, the police find the body of Yasuoga who had been shot five times and also the hideout of the Puppet Clown. Meanwhile, Hajime begins to suspect the kidnapping was not about the ransom, and Itsuki reveals that Yasuoga is Kafuraki's nephew and a known womanizer, including possibly with Reiko Mitamura. Hajime suspects that the Puppet Clown is someone within the company. However, they all have alibis for the period when Yasuoga was shot but Hajime believes that he knows the killer's identity.
50	"The Kidnapping of Reika Hayami Murder Case File 4"; Transliteration: "Hayami Reika Yūkai Satsujin Jiken Fairu 4" (Japanese: 「速水玲香誘拐殺人事件」ファイル4)	June 8, 1998
Hajime explains his theory to the assembled group of Youko Kafuraki's staff. He believes that Yasuoga was the accomplice of the Puppet Clown who then decided to kill him. The Puppet Clown created an alibi by confusing Reika over the date on which Yasuoga was killed and Hajime accuses Yasuoga's wife Manami of being the Puppet Clown. Manami admits her guilt, saying that she was a successful actress until she was beaten and raped by thugs which ruined her career until Yasuoga offered to marry her. She then found out that the rape was a ploy by Yasuoga himself to marry her and further his career in the company and so she plotted revenge. Following her revelation, she drinks some tea and falls dead, poisoned. Later, Hajime receives a gift and a phone call from Kafuraki company Secretary Kobuchizawa who says he is really the Puppeteer from Hell Yoichi Takato, who manipulated Manami and then poisoned her. Hajime swears to catch him in the name of his grandfather.
51	"French Silver Coins Murder Case File 1"; Transliteration: "Furansu Ginka Satsujin Jiken Fairu 1" (Japanese: 「仏蘭西銀貨殺人事件」ファイル1)	June 15, 1998
Fashion model Masumi Takamori, is blackmailed by an old acquaintance, Hiroshi, who threatens to expose her drug-taking past. She accidentally kills him with a vase, but as Masumi buys a suitcase to dispose of the body, she encounters Hajime, a former classmate. She gives him and Miyuki tickets to a fashion show in Nagaya. That night she disposes of Hiroshi's body. Hajime and Miyuki arrive at Nagaya and stay at the exclusive French hotel to be used for a wedding fashion show of the competing brands for sponsorship by Mitsumoto Property; Kimasawa and Rokujou. Rokujou tries to poach Naoko, but fails. Takamori receives a phone call from someone calling themselves Burial Francs who witnessed her kill Hiroshi and dispose of the body. The person blackmails her into adding a powder to someon's drink. Later, Kimasawa receives a wedding dress with a 5 Franc coin signifying burial. At the evening dinner, Takamori adds the poisonous powder to Naoko's glass, but Rokujou drinks it instead and falls down dead. Inspector Kenmochi arrives to investigate. Case file cast: Fashion label owner and director Yuri Kimasawa, company Vice-Director Yousuke Inukai, top model Masumi Takamori, former model and fashion designer Naoko Torimaru, barman and Naoko's former lover Yuke Toru, Senshi Kakitani from the men's department, apprentice designer Sayako Kiriyama and competing fashion designer Mitsuhiko Rokujou.
52	"French Silver Coins Murder Case File 2"; Transliteration: "Furansu Ginka Satsujin Jiken Fairu 2" (Japanese: 「仏蘭西銀貨殺人事件」ファイル2)	June 2, 1998
Hajime deduces the killer is in their midst, after finding fish in a tank dead, he assumes that the killer dropped in the empty capsule which contained the poison. The fashion competition goes ahead, and Kimasawa promises to make Yuke the company director when she retires. Meanwhile, Takamori suspects that Burial Francs is also present at the hotel. Hajime confronts Takamori over the lack of fingerprints on the poison glass after both he and Takamori had touched it, but she manages to find an excuse. Later, she receives another call from Burial Francs to kill another person and her erratic behavior arouses Hajime's suspicions. The fashion show begins, but backstage, the main dress for Kimasawa has been ruined, so the highly talented Naoko hastily constructs a fantastic dress from tablecloths and available accessories. Suddenly, a package arrives with a burial suit and 5 Franc piece designed for Yousuke Inukai, whom they find dead in an unoccupied room from poisoned wine.
53	"French Silver Coins Murder Case File 3"; Transliteration: "Furansu Ginka Satsujin Jiken Fairu 3" (Japanese: 「仏蘭西銀貨殺人事件」ファイル3)	June 29, 1998
Hajime explains the mystery of how Inukai was poisoned to Masumi, but she feigns innocence. Masumi receives one last instruction from Burial Francs, but it is a trap and she is grabbed by Burial Francs. Just as Kenmochi receives news that data discs containing measurements for the dead people have been stolen, another package arrives with a burial dress for designed for Sayako Kiriyama. Masumi awakes to find herself in a room with a gun and Kiriyama's body just as Hajime and the other arrive to check on her. Inside the locked room, Masumi recognizes the smell of perfume from Burial Francs and believes that it is Yuri Kimasawa herself. When everyone bursts into the room Masumi shoots Kimasawa, believing that she is like a mother bird who destroys her own eggs, in a parallel of her own experience. Hajime believes that Masumi was set up to kill Kimasawa, however Kenmochi does not believe him. Later, Yuke discovers the hotel's wine is fake and Hajime realizes how Kiriyama was killed.
54	"French Silver Coins Murder Case File 4"; Transliteration: "Furansu Ginka Satsujin Jiken Fairu 4" (Japanese: 「仏蘭西銀貨殺人事件」ファイル4)	July 6, 1998
Hajime finally figures out the identity of Burial Francs and sets a trap at the hospital treating Kimasawa to catch the elusive culprit when they try to kill Kimasawa. He explains the killer switched her room key with Kiriyama's so she could lock the room from the outside and he exposes Naoko Torimaru as Burial Francs. Naoko eventually admits her guilt, and reveals how she and Masumi had similar upbringings, and how Kimasawa helped her get rid of a criminal she killed years earlier, however when Kimasawa named Yousuke Inukai as her successor, she decided to act. Suddenly, Kimasawa reveals that Inukai was blackmailing her over the death of the criminal and she was preparing to set Naoko up with her own label. Naoko and Masumi are arrested for the murders, however, Kenmochi allows Masumi to model a Kimasawa wedding dress one last time before being taken to prison.
55	"Who Murdered the Goddess?"; Transliteration: "Dare ga Megami o Koroshita ka?" (Japanese: 誰が女神を殺したか？)	July 13, 1998
Hajime's friend Ryuta Saki has a crush on Sayaka Kamitsu and they go on a double date with Hajime and Myuki. Back at the school, a guard and a teacher find a broken plaster sculpture and the teacher Nakatsukawa unconscious from a blow by another plaster statue in the Art Lab. When the teenagers arrive home, Inspector Kenmochi accuses Sayaka of the attack because she has the only other key to the room. When they all inspect the scene, Ryuta finds a piece of contact lens. By a process of elimination he identifies student Shiomi Hatsune as the attacker. She admits that she visited Nakatsukawa in the lab to declare he love for him, but he said he already had someone else and she accidentally broke the plaster statue over his head. Later, Nakatsukawa recovers and forgives Shiomi for her impetuousness. Case file cast: students Sayaka Kamitsu, Ryuta Saki, Shiomi Hatsune and Sena, teacher Nakatsukawa and café boss Totoroki.
56	"Site of Demon God Murder Case File 1"; Transliteration: "Majin Iseki Satsujin Jiken Fairu 1" (Japanese: 「魔神遺跡殺人事件」ファイル1)	July 27, 1998
Hajime and Miyuki are invited by their senior Satsuki Munakata to her home in the remote Majin Village and they take his cousin Fumi. On the way Hajime tells Fumi about the first time they visited Satsuki to help dig for historical artefacts. Munakata says there are only three families there; Boukyoku, Hoko and her own, Nanakakami. The fourth Doutakute residence was burned down ten years earlier. In her house they have a effigy of the Magamitori God which the family worships as the guardian of the village. The objective of the dig is to find four "devil's artifacts" somewhere in the village which are said to bestow fame and fortune. Dig coordinator Kunamori explains how Bunzaemon originally had the artifacts and became famous. The artifacts were then gathered by Kichieman Munakata, Satsuki's grandfather who became very wealthy, however tragedy had befallen his descendants and he hid and buried the artifacts somewhere in the village. Toribeno, Kunamori's assistant, displays four replicas made by Kichieman; a necklace, blade, mirror and bell. Later, they all go to the Magamitori cave where the dig will take place and after sliding aside the "mirror rock" they dig for a while but find nothing important. After dinner, Miyuki sees a Magamitori figure at the cave and when they investigate, they find Yamato's body inside the sealed cave. Case file cast: Satsuki Munakata and her mother Kyouko, housemaid Yaoi Muranishi, dig coordinator Kunamori from Tojo University, Kunamori's assistant Toribeno, ex-assistants Takeru Yamato and ex-assistant Toyohiro Soga, auntie Asuka Minatoya, a Boukyoku, and her husband Kanichi.
57	"Site of Demon God Murder Case File 2"; Transliteration: "Majin Iseki Satsujin Jiken Fairu 2" (Japanese: 「魔神遺跡殺人事件」ファイル2)	August 3, 1998
Yamato is found dead in the sealed Magamitori cave, strangled by the fake necklace which had been stolen along with the blade and mirror. Satsuki explains the Magamitori curse predicts the death of three people and tells how Kichieman's eldest daughter, eldest son and his wife all died. She says Magamitori gave three commandments; bury the artifacts, build four houses to worship him and finally the eldest daughter must become his servant. With news the phone is not working, three of the residents decide to leave, but are almost killed when the tunnel out of the valley collapses. Then, Asuka Minatoya's husband is killed by a huge falling copper bell. When they return, the fourth replica artifact, the bell, is missing. Later Soga is called out to meet one of the team, but is killed instead, however he is found near the broken seven angle mirror with pages from a torn day calendar in his hand. It is suggested that Satsuki and her mother may want revenge for Shiro Munakata's death a year earlier. Satsuki explains that her mother has been locked in the house since the age of 17 to serve Magamitori and she has never seen her face. Later, Kyouko Munakata approaches Hajime and Miyuki.
58	"Site of Demon God Murder Case File 3"; Transliteration: "Majin Iseki Satsujin Jiken Fairu 3" (Japanese: 「魔神遺跡殺人事件」ファイル3)	August 10, 1998
Kyouko Munakata asks Hajime to pass a letter to her daughter Satsuki and says she will take care of the Magamitori curse. That night Hajime and Miyuki see the Magamitori who leaps through a window and with Kyouko Munakata and apparently throws her over a cliff into the river leaving the replica dagger behind. With four people dead, everyone feels the danger has passed but Haijme continues his investigation. He believes that he has found the location of the artifacts based on plans of the mansion and knows the identity of the killer after solving the mystery of how the four murders were committed.
59	"Site of Demon God Murder Case File 4"; Transliteration: "Majin Iseki Satsujin Jiken Fairu 4" (Japanese: 「魔神遺跡殺人事件」ファイル4)	August 17, 1998
Hajime reveals that the next page on the calendar from which Soga tore the pages from was the month of March, which in ancient Japanese revealed Yaoi Muranishi as the killer. He then reveals the location of the artifacts through an arrangement of mirrors in the mansion and finds them hidden beneath a stone statue. Muranishi explains that Kyouko manipulated Shiro Munakata into marrying her, but she feared he would leave her after finding the artifacts so she destroyed his research. Muranishi and Munakata then became lovers, but when she became pregnant Kyouko figured out about her betrayal. They fought and Kyouko fell down the stairs and died. They covered up her death, and Munakata wore a veil and pretended to be the reclusive Kyouko. When the baby was born, they pretended the baby was Kyouko's daughter. However when Munakata heard Yamato and Soga say they caused Shiro's death, she plotted to kill them as she was ill and only had six months to live. Munakata grabs the blade artifact and attempted to kill herself but lightning struck at that exact moment, causing her to lose her memories of what had transpired during that whole case. Back in the present, the trio arrive at Majin Village and are welcomed by Satsuki who explains that Yaoi Munakata died ten days earlier after living for six months in a prison hospital, however they enjoyed that brief time together.
60	"Graveyard Island Murder Case File 1"; Transliteration: "Hakabajima Satsujin Jiken Fairu 1" (Japanese: 「墓場島殺人事件」ファイル1)	August 24, 1998
Hajime, Miyuki and four school friends take a low-cost trip to a vacant island named Graveyard Island. Soon after arrival they find a cave filled with human skulls and bones, then they meet a group of college students in camouflage playing a survival game. That night, Chie Hirashima tells the story of the curse of a Ghost Soldier. During the war, many Japanese soldiers lost their lives on the island. It was sealed off as Graveyard Island, but since then fisherman have reported seeing ghost soldiers there. Meanwhile at one combat group's camp, Yonemura goes missing and the others are targeted by an old war tank. During the night, Hajime is woken by the sound of an explosion. In the morning the combat game players report that they cannot contact the Yonemura team. They eventually find the Yonemura team camp site which has been destroyed by an explosion, apparently from an old tank shell. They attempt to notify the authorities, but find their transmitter does not work and the rope holding their boat has been cut and the boat is gone. During the night, while Tatsuyuki is on guard duty talking to Hajime, Tetsunori is killed. Case file cast: Second grade students from Fudo High School, Chie Hirashima, Remi Morishita, Takeshi Shinma and Koushirou Okasaki; university survival team leader Tatsuyuki Hiyama and team members Wataru Iwano, Shohei Namba and Tetsunori Hagimoto; leader of another survival team, Yonemura.
61	"Graveyard Island Murder Case File 2"; Transliteration: "Hakabajima Satsujin Jiken Fairu 2" (Japanese: 「墓場島殺人事件」ファイル2)	August 31, 1998
The group begin to fear the unseen Ghost Soldier and move their camp to an open area and set traps in the jungle around the camp. During the night one of the sound traps is triggered and Hajime and Miyuki see a skeletal Japanese soldier. When they return to camp, they find Namba stabbed to death in his sleeping bag. Hajime also finds all the traps around the camp have been broken. Early the next morning Hajime and Miyuki encounter a mouse which dies from eating poisoned bread, and he later finds clues that indicate that the murderer is someone in their group. That night Iwano asks Hajime to take the first watch and he does, but sets up a dummy of himself in the jungle. The murderer stabs the dummy, then someone tries to strangle Hajime, but they escape. Hajime deduces that the murderer captured Yonemura and used him as a Ghost Soldier decoy to deflect suspicion, and asserts that the culprit is among them.
62	"Graveyard Island Murder Case File 3"; Transliteration: "Hakabajima Satsujin Jiken Fairu 3" (Japanese: 「墓場島殺人事件」ファイル3)	September 7, 1998
Hajime deduces the murderer is Tatsuyuki Hiyama who killed Yonemura's team and captured Yonemura to appear as a Ghost Soldier. However, the killer did not realize that Yonemura scratched a dying message while he was tied up, which was a type of Morse code that referred to an event in a village 2 years ago. Hajime proposes that Hiyama then killed him with poisoned bread and that the murderer has an accomplice within the group, and he accuses Remi Morishita. However Hiyama denies knowing her and eats a poison capsule, intending to take all the blame himself. Later, Yonemura's poisoned body is found, dressed in a Japanese soldier's uniform confirming Hajime's hypothesis. Remi Morishita, eventually admits her guilt and is imprisoned, but after she discovers that she is pregnant with Hiyama's child, she tells Hajime their story. She and Hiyama were from a small mountain village which was burned down 2 years ago by young men playing war games and only a few people survived. They moved to Tokyo and overheard Hagimoto and the others talking about how they caused the fire. Hiyama swore to take revenge for the village and their parents' deaths. Remi reveals that she decided to tell Hajime everything, because she is pregnant with Hiyama's child and has decided to raise their child and tell him/her about everything as redemption.
63	"Superintendent Akechi's Splendid Reasoning"; Transliteration: "Akechi Keishi no Karei Naru Suiri" (Japanese: 「明智警視の華麗なる推理」)	September 14, 1998
Tired after working at an amusement park, Hajime Kindaichi is on a train home when he is accused of murdering the loan broker Ekuma Tadao on the train and arrested. Hajime claims he is innocent and Akechi promises that he will seize the real killer. Now in jail, Hajime's fate depends on the detective skills of Inspector Akechi. Akechi commences his investigation by analyzing the crime scene, questioning the witnesses and probing Tadao's background. However, Kindaichi appears to be the only person who could have committed the murder. Slowly Akechi pieces together the evidence, and accuses the conductor, Kiyoshi Yagi of being the murderer. Yagi confesses, saying that he lost 20 years of savings to Tadao and killed him when he saw him on the train. Meanwhile, Hajime while in jail, also deduces that Yagi was the murderer. Case file cast: Finance company director Ekuma Tadao, Fudoyama Electric Railway driver Yoshikatsu Kaneko and conductor Yagi Kiyoshi, unemployed Kunito Ryusuke, high school girl Naomi Shikazawa and Metropolitan Police Department officer Sumiyoshi Shingo.
64	"Ghost Fire Island Murder Case File 1"; Transliteration: "Onibijima Satsujin Jiken Fairu 1" (Japanese: 「鬼火島殺人事件」ファイル1)	October 12, 1998
Because Hajime has spent all his money, he and Miyuki decide to take a part-time job during the summer vacation at the Otemon summer training camp for medical students. Later, while Hajime is in Otemon Hospital waiting for a gastric medical examination he sees a boy named Kuniaki Ebisawa in a coma. Hajime and Miyuki travel to the camp on Shiranui Island, also called "Ghost Fire Island", where the soul of dead student is said to return every year at this time. They check into the Eikou Hostel where they and meet the other staff including Kouhei Ohno who examined Hajime at Otemon Hospital. They learn the layout of the building which was a former sanatorium and are assigned to clean the disused Crape Myrtle (百日紅, Sarusuberi) Room. They also meet the students, and the friendly student Yozo Kawasaki accidentally mentions Ebisawa. Kouhei Ohno tells tem about the "test of courage" which involves peering through the keyhole into the Sarusuberi Room in which the ghost of a student who committed suicide appears every year at midnight on August 15. Through the keyhole, Hajime sees Keiichi Morimura being hung in the locked room. However when they enter the room, it is empty. Case file cast: Hostel manager Tenzo Tsukahara, Part-time worker Kouhei Ohno, cook Yuri Shintani, doctor at Otemon Hospital Yozo Kawasaki, high school English teacher Asami Hanamura, students; Keiichi Morimura, Kentaro Kato, Aya Ota, Makio Shiina and Yutaka Kawashima.
65	"Ghost Fire Island Murder Case File 2"; Transliteration: "Onibijima Satsujin Jiken Fairu 2" (Japanese: 「鬼火島殺人事件」ファイル2)	October 19, 1998
Hajime and the other students are perplexed at the vision of Morimura being hung when Makio Shiina runs up to them saying he saw a ghost outside his window. Hostel manager Tenzo Tsukahara prevents them from disturbing Morimura to check if he is alive. In the morning, Morimura cannot be found, and Makio Shiina believes he is the next to be killed by the spirit of Kuniaki Ebisawa as he saw a will-o'-the-wisp outside the window. Kentaro Kato explains that he, Morimura and Shiina bullied Ebisawa so much that he attempted suicide and is now in a coma at Otemon Hospital. Hajime wants to notify Kenmochi of the disappearance, but Yozo Kawasaki stops the discussion and orders the students to attend their lessons. Later, they find Morimura's body, but cannot call the police because someone smashed the telephone equipment. That afternoon Makio Shiina disappears, and Hajime finds his body hanging high in the rafters in the nearby church.
66	"Ghost Fire Island Murder Case File 3"; Transliteration: "Onibijima Satsujin Jiken Fairu 3" (Japanese: 「鬼火島殺人事件」ファイル3)	October 26, 1998
Shiina's body hangs high in the church, but the ladder which has disappeared and they are unable to bring it down. Dr. Kawasaki asks Hajime to try to solve the murders, but after Hajime's analysis of the available information, only Kawasaki has no alibi. Asami Hanamura tells Hajime that during the test of courage, she saw Yutaka Kawashima carrying the ladder. Meanwhile, Kentaro Kato fears for his life and believes that Ebisawa is after him. Late that night, Yuri Shintani tries to strangle Kato. Hajime reveals that Yuri is the elder sister of Kuniaki Ebisawa but he doesn't believe she killed Morimura and Shiina. Kato asks to sleep in Hajime's room, but Hajime cannot stay awake, and discovers that Kato had been hanged in his room while he was sleeping.
67	"Ghost Fire Island Murder Case File 4"; Transliteration: "Onibijima Satsujin Jiken Fairu 4" (Japanese: 「鬼火島殺人事件」ファイル4)	November 2, 1998
With Kato now dead, Hajime analyses the clues and returns to the church where the very much alive Shiina is preparing to burn down the building. Hajime explains how Shiina faked his hanging, and that he feels guilty for betraying his friend Ebisawa. He feared that if he did not participate in the bullying, Morimura and Shiina would have bullied him instead. He prepares to commit suicide, but Yuri convinces him to stay alive and rejoin his best friend Ebisawa when he eventually recovers.
68	"Inspector Kenmochi's Secret File 1"; Transliteration: "Kenmochi Keibu no Himitsu Fairu 1" (Japanese: 「剣持警部の秘密」ファイル1)	November 9, 1998
Koshiro Kirisawa, the famous ikebana artist and head of Mugetsu School of Flower Arrangement, is stabbed and killed in the hotel where Inspector Kenmochi is staying. Kenmochi believes he witnessed the murder in an external stairwell by a woman around 2am, and one of the hotel staff also reports seeing her. Kirisawa's two step-daughters Beniko and Midoriko are prime suspects because if Kirisawa's fiancée Akemi Todo has his child, they would inherit his entire estate. Kenmochi asks Hajime to help him with the case, and after examining the crime scene, Hajime deduces the identity of the culprit over dinner. He takes everyone to the crime scene where he explains what happened and accuses the older sister Beniko of killing her father. She admits killing him because he married their mother shortly after their father's death. However, Todo tells them that Kirisawa was their real father who had an affair with their mother when she was married, and he dearly loved his daughters. Both Beniko and Midoriko are devastated by the revelation. Case file cast: Ikebana artist and head of Mugetsu School of Flower Arrangement Koshiro Kirisawa, twin daughters Beniko and Midoriko and Kirisawa's fiancée Akemi Todo.
69	"Inspector Kenmochi's Secret File 2"; Transliteration: "Kenmochi Keibu no Himitsu Fairu 2" (Japanese: 「剣持警部の秘密」ファイル2)	November 16, 1998
Kenmochi presents Hajime with another case. A computer teacher named Nanako Segawa is found dead in a park. Yuri Mishima, a student from the computer school is arrested for the murder, but Hajime thinks that this is an exchange murder, and there is a mastermind behind the killing. There are three suspects who also use Yuri's computer, and none have adequate alibis. After examining the computer room and the evidence, Hajime believes he knows the culprit. Suddenly, the student Rumi Nakajima threatens to throw herself off the rooftop rather than be accused of Segawa's murder, however Kenmochi intervenes and stops her. Hajime then explains the mastermind is someone who knows that Mishima is a frustrated rival to Nakajima for the handsome Yoshiki Maruyama's affection, and Hajime accuses Kenichi Hamaoka, a teacher in the computer class. Hamaoka admits that he discovered that Segawa was embezzling money from her family's company and initially helped her, but he became afraid of the consequences and planned to have her killed, using Mishima as his tool. Case file cast: Computer class teachers Nanako Segawa and Kenichi Hamaoka, students Yuri Mishima, Rumi Nakajima, Yoshiki Maruyama, Junpei Ariyoshi, Mari Otsuka and Miwa Shimamoto.
70	"Ijinkan Hotel Murder Case File 1"; Transliteration: "Ijinkan Hoteru Satsujin Jiken Fairu 1" (Japanese: 「異人館ホテル殺人事件」ファイル1)	November 23, 1998
Hajime and Miyuki head to a hotel in Hakodate to help out with a case involving a threatening message against a theater company.
71	"Ijinkan Hotel Murder Case File 2"; Transliteration: "Ijinkan Hoteru Satsujin Jiken Fairu 2" (Japanese: 「異人館ホテル殺人事件」ファイル2)	November 30, 1998
The red-bearded murderer is still at large. The hotel owner reveals the story behind the guest who lived in the red room.
72	"Ijinkan Hotel Murder Case File 3"; Transliteration: "Ijinkan Hoteru Satsujin Jiken Fairu 3" (Japanese: 「異人館ホテル殺人事件」ファイル3)	December 7, 1998
Hajime tries to snap out of the shock of what happened to Saki as he pushes on to solve the mystery. Another person claims to be the real culprit.
73	"Ijinkan Hotel Murder Case File 4"; Transliteration: "Ijinkan Hoteru Satsujin Jiken Fairu 4" (Japanese: 「異人館ホテル殺人事件」ファイル4)	December 14, 1998
The truth takes center stage as Hajime reveals that the culprit did something during the play that proves they committed the crimes. Hajime reveals that the culprit is the police superintendent. She had committed these murders because the drama troupe had played a hand in ruining her life. Hajime also reveals that the superintendent is also actually the twin sister of one the victims, she had given herself a new identity and face. Hajime figured this out because the two had held their spoons the same way and a DNA test proved that the two were indeed biological sisters. Faced with this evidence, she reveals that when she was younger she went down a dark path and ended getting involved in drugs. Eventually she killed the man that had given her the drugs and tried to force her into prostitution. When she went to her sister she did not hesitate to help, things seemed fine until the police arrived and believing that her own sister betrayed her she fled. Seeing no way out she had decided to kill herself, until she spotted a pair shoes and several belongings near a cliff belonging to someone who had jumped into the ocean. Seeing this as an opportunity she switched the IDs and she became the woman she is today. She decided to take a path of justice and find the ones responsible for selling the drugs that found their way to her. Which had her crossing paths with the drama troupe, she had collected enough evidence to take them down for good. However it was then that she was reunited with her sister and she accidentally revealed her true identity. Ever since the drama troupe members used her position as a police superintendent to steal for them and bail them out of their crimes. Having enough she decided to rid herself of them and the sister who she believed betrayed her. Later on, Hajime visits the former superintendent and talks to her about her sister. She reveals that her sister had been juggling two jobs all along, the other job being a fashion designer. Hajime reveals that they had found a diary containing her sister's true thoughts: it revealed that she had been working two jobs because she had hoped that her sister would make the right choice and when she had served her time, she would have her sister take over in the drama troupe while she would design clothes for her to perform in. Hearing this she breaks down realizing that her sister had truly cared for her all along.
74	"Computer Cottage Murder Case File 1"; Transliteration: "Dennō Sansō Satsujin Jiken Fairu 1" (Japanese: 「電脳山荘殺人事件」ファイル1)	January 11, 1999
Hajime and Miyuki get lost while skiing, fortunately they find a cottage in the snow. They know that the residents in the house always use computers to connect with each other.
75	"Computer Cottage Murder Case File 2"; Transliteration: "Dennō Sansō Satsujin Jiken Fairu 2" (Japanese: 「電脳山荘殺人事件」ファイル2)	January 18, 1999
Sojo is killed in his room. Rampo and Watson are suspected to have the motive to kill him.
76	"Computer Cottage Murder Case File 3"; Transliteration: "Dennō Sansō Satsujin Jiken Fairu 3" (Japanese: 「電脳山荘殺人事件」ファイル3)	January 25, 1999
Rampo is stabbed in the snow and dies after he says "Patri......" to Kindaichi and Watson. Some time later, they find a female corpse, which turns out to be Spencer.
77	"Computer Cottage Murder Case File 4"; Transliteration: "Dennō Sansō Satsujin Jiken Fairu 4" (Japanese: 「電脳山荘殺人事件」ファイル4)	February 1, 1999
Patricia is found poisioned in her cottage. Kindaichi discovers a murder case committed by the Computer Cottage members years ago. Agatha is revealed to be an imposter and the murderer. Hajime reveals that she had not only killed the members of the computer members at the cottage, but the real Agatha as well. Faced with the overwhelming evidence, she admits to murdering the computer cottage members. She reveals herself to be the fiancée of the victim, who the computer members had systematically killed in order to make some money. She reveals that she was once a delinquent, but her future fiancée who was a teacher took her in and helped her turn her life around for the better. But after he died she went and met the real Agatha who was revealed to be a delinquent high school student. She revealed to her how they had orchestrated her fiancée's murder, as a result she killed the real Agatha and decided to kill the rest of them for revenge. She attempts to kill herself along with everyone else via a bag filled with poison, but Kenmochi stops her just in time. Afterwards after she has been arrested one of the computer members apologizes for killing her fiancée.
78	"Saint Valentine Murder Case File 1"; Transliteration: "Seinto Barentain no Satsujin Fairu 1" (Japanese: 「聖バレンタインの殺人」ファイル1)	February 8, 1999
Hajime and Miyuki go to a cottage in Nagano to spend their Valentine's Day. They and Aoyama, the owner of the cottage, find three members from the Kyogoku Family.
79	"Saint Valentine Murder Case File 2"; Transliteration: "Seinto Barentain no Satsujin Fairu 2" (Japanese: 「聖バレンタインの殺人」ファイル2)	February 15, 1999
One of the Kyogoku Brothers is killed with the message of "The Angel of Death" left near his corpse. Some time later, Hajime receives a phone call from Yousuke Kyogoku. The latter wants Hajime to help him.
80	"Saint Valentine Murder Case File 3"; Transliteration: "Seinto Barentain no Satsujin Fairu 3" (Japanese: 「聖バレンタインの殺人」ファイル3)	February 22, 1999
Hajime figures out the real killer who commits the murders in such a romantic festival.
81	"Fumi Kindaichi's Lovely Activity! The Case of Fumi's Kidnapping"; Transliteration: "Kindaichi Fumi no Karen na Katsuyaku! Fumi no Yūkai Jiken" (Japanese: 金田一フミの可憐な活躍!「フミの誘拐事件」)	March 1, 1999
A bank robber has committed a robbery and is trying to escape through the back door, but he happens to see Fumi walking over after getting out who accidentally sees his real face. Hajime, Miyuki and the police frantically try to find her and they succeed with help from Fumi herself after she discreetly told them where she was via riddles she gave to the robber. The robber tries to talk his way out by taking Fumi hostage at knifepoint until his wife and workers arrive and manage to talk him down successfully. In the end, Fumi seeing that the old man was in fact a kind person decides to lie about being kidnapped by him.
82	"Fumi Kindaichi's Lovely Activity! Mirror Labyrinth Murder Case"; Transliteration: "Kindaichi Fumi no Karen na Katsuyaku! Mirā Rabirinsu no Satsujin" (Japanese: 金田一フミの可憐な活躍!「鏡迷宮の殺人」)	March 8, 1999
One day when Hajime, Miyuki, and Fumi are at amusement park they meet four beautiful women that are also best friends. However later on, one of them is murdered in a Mirror Labyrinth that they are all in. Inspector Kenmochi arrives and Hajime learns that the other three women have perfect alibis during the murder. After investigating Hajime manages to figure out how the victim Komine was killed in the mirror labyrinth and who was responsible. Hajime reveals that the murderer is Kazuna who had the strongest alibi of the three women. As it turns out she had killed Komine beforehand and falsified the time of death using a trick. The mirror labyrinth had been breaking down and she used this to her advantage. She went to the end of the other side of the labyrinth where on the other side Komine's already dead body was and screamed pretending to be her and threw her safety alarm over the mirror to where her body was. Then she ran to where Komine's body was giving her the perfect alibi. Faced with this evidence she confesses and reveals that Komine had caused her father's death. A few months back both Kazuna and Komine had both applied to the same tv station to be news anchors. But Komine felt that she did not stand a chance against Kazuna but they both agreed to do their best. Kazuna had managed to get the position, but when she went back home to tell her father, she found him dead from overworking. She believed that it was just an unfortunate accident, but her father's co-worker had told her the truth. He had wanted to get a loan from Komine's father, but he said he would only agree if his daughter Kazuna would drop out from the job interview. But he was not willing to risk his daughter's happiness and future as a result he refused to take a loan from him. When Kazuna heard how Komine herself said that her father would do anything for her, she believed that Komine had caused her father's death and vowed to get revenge. Hajime scolds her for ruining her father's sacrifice but she states that he could never understand how she feels.
83	"Superintendent Akechi's Splendid Reasoning 2"; Transliteration: "Akechi Keishi no Karei Naru Suiri Sono 2" (Japanese: 「明智警視の華麗なる推理」その2)	March 15, 1999
Sup. Akechi happens to meet Miyuki on a rainy day while Kindaichi is absent. He tells Miyuki about a murder case that happened on a wet day ten years ago when he came to a cottage.
84	"Murderer From Projection Screen File 1"; Transliteration: "Ginmaku no Satsujinki Fairu 1" (Japanese: 「銀幕の殺人鬼」ファイル1)	April 12, 1999
The leader of the Movie Team from Fudo High School invites Miyuki to have a film made, and Kindaichi gets very angry about this. They see a movie called "The Tragedy of the Scorpion" in the Movie Team HQ. However, a member of the team is found killed later.
85	"Murderer From Projection Screen File 2"; Transliteration: "Ginmaku no Satsujinki Fairu 2" (Japanese: 「銀幕の殺人鬼」ファイル2)	April 19, 1999
Sanada becomes the second victim of the "Scorpion". Hajime also finds that there is something odd in the movie. After investigating Hajime reveals that what he found was that there was another crew member that was strangely never credited in the film. He deduces that the forgotten crew member was in fact a stuntman that died during the filming and they hid this fact from everyone. Suddenly, one by one everyone besides kurasawa falls unconscious.
86	"Murderer From Projection Screen File 3"; Transliteration: "Ginmaku no Satsujinki Fairu 3" (Japanese: 「銀幕の殺人鬼」ファイル3)	April 26, 1999
Kadowaki and Kurasawa are found dead. Everybody thinks that Kurasawa committed suicide after killing the first three deceased members by drinking the poisoned beverage, except Hajime.
87	"Murderer From Projection Screen File 4"; Transliteration: "Ginmaku no Satsujinki Fairu 4" (Japanese: 「銀幕の殺人鬼」ファイル4)	May 3, 1999
Hajime figures out all of the tricks used for the series of murders, and he tells everybody who is the "Scorpion". Hajime reveals that one of the female crew members is the scorpion. With help from Kenmochi, they learn that the girl was in fact the little sister of the stuntman who died filming their movie. She reveals that she had suspected some foul play when her brother had mysteriously disappeared and since the police wouldn't help she took action. She watched over a dozen amateur films at school festivals hoping to find her brother's film as she had read the script and knew its plot and settings. Eventually she found the film in question and secretly eavesdropped on Kurasawa and the others, and learned that her brother had died when performing a stunt that involved him jumping from one apartment rooftop to the other. He was successful, but a downdraft caused him to lose his balance and he fell to his death. But what pushed her over the edge was that they had not only insulted her brother by saying that a dummy would never die, but also because they apparently removed a safety mattress that could have saved him and lied to her older brother as they told him that it was there when it wasn't. Later on, Hajime visits her and reveals that they had recovered her brother's body which was found in a man hole sewer pipe. Hajime also reveals that her brother was cast as lead for a future film, with her commenting that there is no doubt that his film would take first place.
88	"Young Akechi's Splendid Challenge File 1"; Transliteration: "Akechi Shōnen no Karei Naru Chōsen Fairu 1" (Japanese: 「明智少年の華麗なる挑戦」ファイル1)	May 10, 1999
There was a case in the Shuo High School when Superintendent Akechi was still in his senior high school study. A student was found dead in the library and it was said he was killed after everybody left the school.
89	"Young Akechi's Splendid Challenge File 2"; Transliteration: "Akechi Shōnen no Karei Naru Chōsen Fairu 2" (Japanese: 「明智少年の華麗なる挑戦」ファイル2)	May 17, 1999
Akechi was called by the police since he might have the opportunity to kill the student. However, Akechi himself managed to prove his innocence and figured out the real murderer. Akechi deduces that one of his friends nicknamed Watson is the murderer. Watson confesses and reveals that the reason why he did what he did was because the delinquent had caught him cheating in one of the exams that he took to stay in the elite class. As a result he was repeatedly blackmailed by him, until one day when he gave the victim his hush money he asked Watson to send the girl of the elite class to him for some "fun". Enraged Watson bashed his head in with a book and set up a trick to hide his body for the time being. When Akechi asked him why he had to cheat on the exams, he revealed that lately he had grown too lax and he could not focus like he usually could. In the end, Watson decides to turn himself in and leaves them much to their sadness. In present day, Akechi visits his friends near their old school who have gotten married as they had feelings for each other even way back then. They reveal to Akechi's shock that Watson had passed away not too long ago and they have his last will with them. Watson after serving his time, moved to Africa where he had been helping the sick there. However, one day a flood occurred and a child was stranded in the strong currents Watson quickly jumped in and saved the child. Unfortunately he could not save himself and ended up getting swept away by the currents. In the letter, Watson wrote that he did regret what he did which is why he went to Africa and helped the sick as a form of redemption and states that he will always look up to him.
90	"Legendary Shanghai Mermaid Murder Case File 1"; Transliteration: "Shanhai Gyojin Densetsu Satsujin Jiken Fairu 1" (Japanese: 「上海魚人伝説殺人事件」ファイル1)	May 24, 1999
Miyuki is invited by her Chinese pen friend Yang Laili to visit the Acrobats' Troupe in Shanghai.
91	"Legendary Shanghai Mermaid Murder Case File 2"; Transliteration: "Shanhai Gyojin Densetsu Satsujin Jiken Fairu 2" (Japanese: 「上海魚人伝説殺人事件」ファイル2)	May 31, 1999
The troupe leader dies with a Derringer on the table and the local police have been investigating on the case. One of the acrobats does not have an alibi.
92	"Legendary Shanghai Mermaid Murder Case File 3"; Transliteration: "Shanhai Gyojin Densetsu Satsujin Jiken Fairu 3" (Japanese: 「上海魚人伝説殺人事件」ファイル3)	June 7, 1999
Hajime tries to escort Yang Xiaolong out because of the police's actions. He goes to Xiaolong's home after leaving urban.
93	"Legendary Shanghai Mermaid Murder Case File 4"; Transliteration: "Shanhai Gyojin Densetsu Satsujin Jiken Fairu 4" (Japanese: 「上海魚人伝説殺人事件」ファイル4)	June 21, 1999
Hajime chooses to return to the show ship rather than returning to Tokyo, and he tells the group members how the killer murdered Tang Renmei and Todo before revealing their identity. The killer is revealed to be Miyuki's pen pal Yang Laili, she reveals that she was actually born in Japan and her father was actually her kidnapper and her real father's murderer. Yang reveals that when she was a child, she witnessed the murder of her biological father and was kidnapped and taken in by her adoptive father. But she always knew the truth and one day she fled hoping to reunite with her real father, only to learn that he had died that fateful day. She decided to stay with them unsure of what to do, until her adoptive father had committed suicide riddled with guilt all this time. It was then that she decided to kill the others that were responsible for killing her real father. After Yang is taken away, her adoptive brother decides to wait for her as he will always love her.
94	"Fumi Kindaichi's Lovely Activity! Cormorant Village Murder Case"; Transliteration: "Kindaichi Fumi no Karen na Katsuyaku! Ukaimura Satsujin Jiken" (Japanese: 金田一フミの可憐な活躍!「鵜飼村殺人事件」)	June 28, 1999
Mr. Inokuma takes his students to his hometown called Cormorant Village to see a local classical performance, but someone is found dead when the festival is in process. With some hints from Hajime, Fumi finally solves the case and figures out who the murderer is. Fumi reveals that the murderer is in fact her own teacher Mr. Inokuma. She reveals that she had figured this out because her teacher had arrived to retrieve his two students, however no one not even the police knew that there was two students. As the boy Fumi was on a date with had run off when they were being chased by the murderer. Meaning only the killer themselves could have known that there were two kids that had witnessed the murder. Another piece of evidence was the fish stuffed in the victim's mouth, which was done to hide the blood from the killer after they were bitten by the victim. Mr. Inokuma had a bandage over his left arm and he removes it showing a bite mark, mostly likely from the victim. He confesses to being the murderer and Fumi asks him why he did this and he reveals that he had a past with the victim. As it turns out they had met years ago, when Mr. Inokuma had gone to a river with his wife and son when an accident occurred. His son who was swimming had starting struggling in the water and Mr. Inokuma saw the man fishing and asked him to help his son, however his just threw his fishing rod in the water and ran away. Mr. Inokuma tried in vain to save his son whose body was found not too long after. He found it strange that his son who was great at swimming had struggled so much and saw that his son had strange markings all over his body, which were consistent with injuries from a wire. He then realized that the man had run off because his fishing wire had gotten tangled with his son and he decided to run off rather than get in trouble. Mr. Inokuma told the police about this but there wasn't much they could do. He accepted that it was just a horrible accident and believed that he would never see that man again. However, he would when that man had nearly killed him and his students while driving his car. Seeing that man smiling nonchalantly made his boil blood, causing his suppressed anger and grief to explode. Fumi shocked and grief stricken breaks down in tears because her favorite teacher turned out to be a murderer, Mr. Inokuma apologizes to her and is taken away by the police. Later, Kindaichi and Miyuki pick up Fumi who is still sad about the whole case. Kindaichi offers Fumi his CD player and she immediately perks up thrilled and happy.
95	"Amakusa Treasure Legend Murder Case File 1"; Transliteration: "Amakusa Zaihō Densetsu Satsujin Jiken Fairu 1" (Japanese: 「天草財宝伝説殺人事件」ファイル1)	July 5, 1999
Itsuki brings Hajime and Miyuki to Amakusa in search of legendary treasure. Other treasure seekers also join in on the hunt.
96	"Amakusa Treasure Legend Murder Case File 2"; Transliteration: "Amakusa Zaihō Densetsu Satsujin Jiken Fairu 2" (Japanese: 「天草財宝伝説殺人事件」ファイル2)	July 12, 1999
The treasure hunters discover a helpful lead among the belongings left behind by the victim of the white-haired killer.
97	"Amakusa Treasure Legend Murder Case File 3"; Transliteration: "Amakusa Zaihō Densetsu Satsujin Jiken Fairu 3" (Japanese: 「天草財宝伝説殺人事件」ファイル3)	July 19, 1999
The murder count rises with the discovery of another body. Hajime and the others continue to search for treasure as the killer seeks the next victim.
98	"Amakusa Treasure Legend Murder Case File 4"; Transliteration: "Amakusa Zaihō Densetsu Satsujin Jiken Fairu 4" (Japanese: 「天草財宝伝説殺人事件」ファイル4)	July 26, 1999
The latest victim left behind a will that confesses to her committing the crimes. Hajime gains the proof he needs to solve the mystery.
99	"Amakusa Treasure Legend Murder Case File 5"; Transliteration: "Amakusa Zaihō Densetsu Satsujin Jiken Fairu 5" (Japanese: 「天草財宝伝説殺人事件」ファイル5)	August 2, 1999
After luring the killer into a trap, Hajime explains the tricks they used in order to commit the crimes. In turn, the killer's motives are revealed.
100	"Midsummer's Nightmare Murder Case"; Transliteration: "Manatsu no Akumu Satsujin Jiken" (Japanese: 「真夏の悪夢殺人事件」)	August 9, 1999
Hajime bought a bag of drinks and didn't feel well outside, so he went to a cottage nearby and managed to solve the problem. As he came out of the bathroom, three girls came and glanced at him because they thought he interrupted their processing ceremony.
101	"Thunder Festival Murder Case File 1"; Transliteration: "Ikazuchi Matsuri Satsujin Jiken Fairu 1" (Japanese: 「雷祭殺人事件」ファイル1)	August 16, 1999
Hajime and Miyuki visit their former classmate who is dealing with a tense situation at home. Meanwhile, the village prepares for a festival.
102	"Thunder Festival Murder Case File 2"; Transliteration: "Ikazuchi Matsuri Satsujin Jiken Fairu 2" (Japanese: 「雷祭殺人事件」ファイル2)	August 23, 1999
The festival kicks off with heavy rain while a murder takes place. Hajime has a conversation with the daughter of the late master's second wife.
103	"Thunder Festival Murder Case File 3"; Transliteration: "Ikazuchi Matsuri Satsujin Jiken Fairu 3" (Japanese: 「雷祭殺人事件」ファイル3)	September 6, 1999
Hajime gathers everyone to reveal the mysteries and motives behind what happened during the murder of the entomologist.
104	"Restaurant of Murderous Intent"; Transliteration: "Satsui no Resutoran" (Japanese: 「殺意のレストラン」)	September 13, 1999
Hajime and Officer Kenmochi go to a restaurant to have something to eat. The waiter serves them very well and gives them a good meal, but Kindaichi still finds something suspicious. He eventually manages to figure out that the waiter in question had committed a murder and attempted to cover it up. The waiter had done several suspicious things: he did not know where the toilet paper was in the bathroom, the apron that was delivered was for a woman not a man, and finally he panicked when Kindaichi had accidentally knocked over the seat he was on which revealed some fruits that were still cold. The fruit being cold meant they were kept in a fridge for a long time, meaning he removed the fruit to put something else inside. Kindaichi opens the fridge revealing the woman's body that falls out, however she is revealed to be alive. The fake waiter exposed tries to flee, but Inspector Kenmochi takes him down and arrests him. Later on, when Kenmochi asks what the murder weapon was, Hajime unfortunately reveals that the murder weapon was the meat that Kenmochi ate much to his chagrin.
105	"Demon Dog Forest Murder Case File 1"; Transliteration: "Maken no Mori no Satsujin Fairu 1" (Japanese: 「魔犬の森の殺人」ファイル1)	September 20, 1999
Hajime goes camping with his classmates. They come across a particular facility while searching for a place to stay after finding their cabin trashed.
106	"Demon Dog Forest Murder Case File 2"; Transliteration: "Maken no Mori no Satsujin Fairu 2" (Japanese: 「魔犬の森の殺人」ファイル2)	October 11, 1999
Hajime learns about the medical students' secret past while the others search the facility for a rabies vaccine.
107	"Demon Dog Forest Murder Case File 3"; Transliteration: "Maken no Mori no Satsujin Fairu 3" (Japanese: 「魔犬の森の殺人」ファイル3)	October 18, 1999
One of the men goes missing after another victim is found. Hajime and the others discover a hidden staircase while looking for the missing man.
108	"Demon Dog Forest Murder Case File 4"; Transliteration: "Maken no Mori no Satsujin Fairu 4" (Japanese: 「魔犬の森の殺人」ファイル4)	October 25, 1999
Hajime solves the final riddle Watanabe left behind and reveals who is truly responsible for the murders. Hajime reveals that his classmate Senke is the murderer and explains that he had used various tricks to kill the medical students. Hajime reveals that the dying message that Watanabe left behind which was a melon, referred to the person who had the highest number in their name meaning Senke. Faced with all the evidence, Senke reveals that he killed three of the medical students because they had murdered his girlfriend Rio. He had first met her when he saw an injured dog on the street, no one was willing to help it except for Rio who without regard to her life went to help the dog. Senke saw for himself how much she cared for dogs and fell in love with her, he asked her to be his girlfriend. But Rio turned him down as she was terminally ill and only had six months left to live, but nonetheless he decided that time would be enough and she accepted his confession. However, this love would never sprout because one day Senke learned that Rio who had gone to the hospital for treatment had died suddenly. He could not understand how she could suddenly take a turn for worse as she still had six months to live. Senke knew something was off and tried to find out what had happened, he eventually learned that the ones that treated Rio weren't even real doctors but interns. Watanabe and his friends were the ones responsible, Senke eavesdropped on them and learned that they had used Rio as an experimental Guinea pig to test their new drug. But it ended up backfiring and caused Rio's condition to worsen and eventually killed her. But not only did they not care about what they did to Rio, but they said that she was going to die anyway so it did not matter. This pushed him over the edge and he decided to kill all of them in revenge. As his last act Senke orders the dogs to maul Yorozuya to death, but the dogs refuse as they were trained to be kind to others by Rio. Senke seeing this realizes that Rio wouldn't want anyone to hurt by the animals she loved. Afterwards, Inspector Kenmochi states that most likely Yorozuya will be charged and the hospital will be investigated for their cover-up in Rio's death.
109	"Young Akechi's Splendid Concerto File 1"; Transliteration: "Akechi Shōnen no Karei Naru kyōsōkyoku Fairu 1" (Japanese: 「明智少年の華麗なる協奏曲」ファイル1)	November 1, 1999
Akechi had taken part in a classical band ten years ago, and he played as the violinist. During the performance, Reona Kirishima got killed on the stage.
110	"Young Akechi's Splendid Concerto File 2"; Transliteration: "Akechi Shōnen no Karei Naru kyōsōkyoku Fairu 2" (Japanese: 「明智少年の華麗なる協奏曲」ファイル2)	November 8, 1999
Akechi found that there was a poisoned spike placed inside the keys of the piano that could lead to a person's death, and he pointed out the killer was one of his mates.
111	"Yukikage Village Murder Case File 1"; Transliteration: "Yukikagemura Satsujin Jiken Fairu 1" (Japanese: 「雪影村殺人事件」ファイル1)	November 15, 1999
Kindaichi receives a call from his old mate Shimazu to go back to the Yukikage Village. After some time, Hajime meets his old friends, who are all studying in the Yukikage High School, in the village center. They take part in the funeral of Haruna, one of their mates committed suicide not long before. As for the local culture, the dead would be given arrows on her neck before being interred.
112	"Yukikage Village Murder Case File 2"; Transliteration: "Yukikagemura Satsujin Jiken Fairu 2" (Japanese: 「雪影村殺人事件」ファイル2)	November 22, 1999
Hajime finds that Fuyumi and Ayahana are also killed in the same way of the culture.
113	"Yukikage Village Murder Case File 3"; Transliteration: "Yukikagemura Satsujin Jiken Fairu 3" (Japanese: 「雪影村殺人事件」ファイル3)	November 29, 1999
Kindaichi tries to find evidence that Shimatsu has the motion to kill the two mates.
114	"Yukikage Village Murder Case File 4"; Transliteration: "Yukikagemura Satsujin Jiken Fairu 4" (Japanese: 「雪影村殺人事件」ファイル4)	December 6, 1999
Shimatsu admits that his final motion is to take revenge of Harumi.
115	"Fumi Kindaichi's Lovely Activity! Ransom That Vanishes in Snow"; Transliteration: "Kindaichi Fumi no Karen na Katsuyaku! Hakugin ni Kieta Minoshirokin" (Japanese: 金田一フミの可憐な活躍!「白銀に消えた身代金」)	December 13, 1999
A Diet member's son gets abducted. The unknown kidnapper instructs Hajime to deliver the ransom money himself.
116	"The Demon Who Arrives After Losing His Way"; Transliteration: "Mayoi Konde Kita Demon" (Japanese: 「迷い込んできた悪魔」)	December 20, 1999
Akechi has planned a detective game for Kindaichi. How will Kindaichi finish this game?
117	"Legend of Sighing Demon Murder Case File 1"; Transliteration: "Nageki no Oni Densetsu Satsujin Jiken Fairu 1" (Japanese: 「嘆きの鬼伝説殺人事件」 ファイル1)	January 10, 2000
Miyuki visits Kanazawa with Hajime to see her friend Reiko, whose family has made oni masks for generations.
118	"Legend of Sighing Demon Murder Case File 2"; Transliteration: "Nageki no Oni Densetsu Satsujin Jiken Fairu 2" (Japanese: 「嘆きの鬼伝説殺人事件」 ファイル2)	January 17, 2000
Someone is seen fleeing the drama club director murder scene. Hajime suspects that the drama club is keeping complicated secrets.
119	"Legend of Sighing Demon Murder Case File 3"; Transliteration: "Nageki no Oni Densetsu Satsujin Jiken Fairu 3" (Japanese: 「嘆きの鬼伝説殺人事件」 ファイル3)	January 24, 2000
The drama club members fear that the deaths are connected to a curse. One of the oni masks starts to bleed. Hajime realizes who the culprit is.
120	"Young Akechi's Splendid Sword Skills File 1"; Transliteration: "Akechi Shōnen no Karei Naru Kengi Fairu 1" (Japanese: 「明智少年の華麗なる剣技」 ファイル1)	January 31, 2000
Inspector Kenmochi, Hajime and Miyuki go to a fencing competition featuring Kenmochi's cousin. Akechi goes there too, and he tells them an incident that was affiliated with fencing happened ten years ago.
121	"Young Akechi's Splendid Sword Skills File 2"; Transliteration: "Akechi Shōnen no Karei Naru Kengi Fairu 2" (Japanese: 「明智少年の華麗なる剣技」 ファイル2)	February 7, 2000
Everybody found that Makoto Tojo was killed, but they weren't sure how the killer murdered him, since sharp objects were not allowed to bring into the fencing club. Even the sword was not used to commit the murder. But Akechi considered that an ice spike might be the key to the case.
122	"Ghost School Murder Case File 1"; Transliteration: "Bōrei Gakkō Satsujin Jiken Fairu 1" (Japanese: 「亡霊学校殺人事件」ファイル1)	February 14, 2000
Saki, Hajime and Miyuki go to an inn beside a beach. They find a university group that also stay at here. One of the college students tells a story about the ghost, Hanako.
123	"Ghost School Murder Case File 2"; Transliteration: "Bōrei Gakkō Satsujin Jiken Fairu 2" (Japanese: 「亡霊学校殺人事件」ファイル2)	February 21, 2000
The art club student who went missing is discovered dead, but everyone who went exploring with him has a perfect alibi.
124	"Ghost School Murder Case File 3"; Transliteration: "Bōrei Gakkō Satsujin Jiken Fairu 3" (Japanese: 「亡霊学校殺人事件」ファイル3)	February 28, 2000
Hajime arrives at the truth, but first he must take apart all the tricks the killer used to commit the crime. The key evidence is captured on film.
125	"Mystery of Instant Disappearance"; Transliteration: "Shunkan Shōshitsu no Nazo" (Japanese: 「瞬間消失の謎」)	March 6, 2000
A valuable collection of first edition Sherlock Holmes novels gets stolen as the mystery club is busy preparing for their school festival exhibit.
126	"Murderous Deep Blue File 1"; Transliteration: "Satsuriku no Dīpuburū Fairu 1" (Japanese: 「殺戮のディープブルー」ファイル1)	April 10, 2000
Hajime and Miyuki are invited by an ocean development corporation, and the founder's daughter, welcomes them to their resort in Konpeki Island in Okinawa, which is also known as Deep Blue Island.
127	"Murderous Deep Blue File 2"; Transliteration: "Satsuriku no Dīpuburū Fairu 2" (Japanese: 「殺戮のディープブルー」ファイル2)	April 17, 2000
The armored men dressed in white clothes are actually from an organization, which has to revive the so-called kingdom from King Caesar. Everybody has been kidnapped into numerous rooms on the 7th floor.
128	"Murderous Deep Blue File 3"; Transliteration: "Satsuriku no Dīpuburū Fairu 3" (Japanese: 「殺戮のディープブルー」ファイル3)	April 24, 2000
The first victim is found dead in a room with candles that draw the symbol of "DEEP BLUE". Everybody tries to escape from the order of Kindaichi.
129	"Murderous Deep Blue File 4"; Transliteration: "Satsuriku no Dīpuburū Fairu 4" (Japanese: 「殺戮のディープブルー」ファイル4)	May 1, 2000
The two sons are found dead in different rooms. Kindaichi considers that they are killed by the armored men.
130	"Murderous Deep Blue File 5"; Transliteration: "Satsuriku no Dīpuburū Fairu 5" (Japanese: 「殺戮のディープブルー」ファイル5)	May 8, 2000
Kindaichi solves the case and points out who King Caesar is and what motion the killer has.
131	"Alibi in the Film"; Transliteration: "Firumu no Naka no Aribai" (Japanese: 「フィルムの中のアリバイ」)	May 15, 2000
Hajime finds out that Miyuki has someone else accompanying her during her outing, so he trails her to find out who this person is. However, Miyuki is involved in a car accident soon after with the driver fleeing the scene. Inspector Kenmochi finds the driver of the minivan. The car belongs to a photography studio and all three members of the studio have used the minivan to drive themselves to different places on Honshu Island. However, Kindaichi figures out that one of them is lying.
132	"Izumo Myth Murder Case File 1"; Transliteration: "Izumo Shinwa Satsujin Jiken Fairu 1" (Japanese: 「出雲神話殺人事件」ファイル1)	May 22, 2000
A man is killed in the park and Hajime goes to Izumo with the special dying message containing the myth of Yamata no Orochi.
133	"Izumo Myth Murder Case File 2"; Transliteration: "Izumo Shinwa Satsujin Jiken Fairu 2" (Japanese: 「出雲神話殺人事件」ファイル2)	May 29, 2000
The congresswoman, Aoyama is burnt to death by the fire. Later, Fumi finds a skull being thrown into the lake, and in the next morning, the police find a skeleton from the lake, with only the glasses as a known object.
134	"Izumo Myth Murder Case File 3"; Transliteration: "Izumo Shinwa Satsujin Jiken Fairu 3" (Japanese: 「出雲神話殺人事件」ファイル3)	June 5, 2000
The skeleton turns to be a professor who has connection to the two victims. At the same night, the university professor, Shirai, breaks out the code of the tomb of Yamata no Orochi, and he manages to get into the "tomb", which is actually a big cave next morning. But just at that moment, he is killed in the cave.
135	"Izumo Myth Murder Case File 4"; Transliteration: "Izumo Shinwa Satsujin Jiken Fairu 4" (Japanese: 「出雲神話殺人事件」ファイル4)	June 12, 2000
The killer tells everybody about the thing that happened between the dead professor and three other victims.
136	"Superintendent Akechi's Splendid Reasoning in Las Vegas File 1"; Transliteration: "Akechi Keishi no Karei Naru Suiri in Las Vegas Fairu 1" (Japanese: 「明智警視の華麗なる推理 IN LAS VEGAS」ファイル1)	June 19, 2000
Hajime is playing a go chess game in the police headquarters and this makes Akechi remind something happened in Las Vegas in the past. Superintendent Akechi is also a good go-chess player, and he had joined a competition in LV with another great rival, Kenneth Goldman. His mate, Patricia O'Brian, was also there.
137	"Superintendent Akechi's Splendid Reasoning in Las Vegas File 2"; Transliteration: "Akechi Keishi no Karei Naru Suiri in Las Vegas Fairu 2" (Japanese: 「明智警視の華麗なる推理 IN LAS VEGAS」ファイル2)	June 26, 2000
When Akechi was preparing for the chess tournament, another Japanese chess player was found dead in a room. While having a match against Kenneth Goldman, Akechi tells him his deduction and reveals that he knows that Kenneth killed his friend. Akechi was able to deduce that his friend had figured out that Kenneth had been cheating in the chess tournament all along. Kenneth along with his mate Patricia O'Brian had been working together to cheat in the chess tournament. Kenneth owned one of the buildings which was right behind his opponent's seat and he used that building as a giant chessboard that was being controlled by his mate Patricia. She also was watching the tournament via television and used a chess game program on her laptop to replicate his matches and used a A.I to figure out the best move for Kenneth to make, which she then displayed on the building using the lights in the rooms to represent the chess pieces. After Akechi reveals this, he states that he did not turn him in right away because he wanted to see if he could beat an A.I at chess and he manages to beat Kenneth who in turn reveals that he did what he did because he needed money to save his company so he came up with this scheme to win the tournament prize money. In the end both Kenneth and his mate Patricia are arrested for their crimes.
138	"Reverse Impossible! Miyuki Nanase is Suspected of Murder"; Transliteration: "Gyakuten Fukanō! Nanase Miyuki no Satsujin Yōgi" (Japanese: 「逆転不可能! 七瀬美雪の殺人容疑」)	July 3, 2000
Hajime and Miyuki go to an amusement park, but Miyuki accidentally splashes a cup of coffee onto a wealthy woman's purse, which leads to an argument between the two. Hajime manages to defuse the situation and goes into the park with Miyuki and their classmate. However, when Miyuki and the others are playing in the pool the wealthy woman collides with Miyuki. When she resurfaces the wealthy woman is found dead with what appears to be fresh blood pouring from her body. As a result of this, Miyuki is accused of being the murderer but Hajime vows to prove her innocence. Eventually Hajime manages to deduce that Ogino Chika an acquaintance of the wealthy woman had murdered her. She had set up her body after killing her in a way so that she would be found in the waterway of the pool. First she drew some blood from the woman, then slit her throat in the shower to avoid leaving any blood behind, and finally placed the corpse in a pool float face down with two cups full of her blood mixed with plasma. Originally the corpse was supposed to sink into the pool because Ogino had punched a small hole in the pool float which would cause it to lose air slowly. But unfortunately and coincidentally Miyuki happened to be in front of the pool float which caused the body to sink prematurely. Faced with all the evidence, Ogino reveals that she killed Mio the wealthy woman because she had been blackmailing her and treating her like a slave ever since. She had come across the answers to the entrance exam for the medical school they were currently attending. She decided to sell them for money as she was financially strained and needed money to become a doctor. But Mio had found out about this and blackmailed her ever since, however one day she said something that caused Ogino to snap. Mio had ordered her to take the medical license exam in her place, but she could not because it could've have ruined her own chances which is why she decided to kill her.
139	"Russian Dolls Murder Case File 1"; Transliteration: "Roshia Ningyō Satsujin Jiken Fairu 1" (Japanese: 「露西亜人形殺人事件」ファイル1)	July 10, 2000
A famous writer recently died and according to his will, his inheritance will be divided by his five successors. One of the successors, Takarada invites Hajime, Saki and Miyuki to the Russian Mansion in Hokkaido. There are also five Russian dolls inside the mansion.
140	"Russian Dolls Murder Case File 2"; Transliteration: "Roshia Ningyō Satsujin Jiken Fairu 2" (Japanese: 「露西亜人形殺人事件」ファイル2)	July 17, 2000
The first victim is Tadaharu Jinmei, he is found killed inside the bathtub. The next morning, when Hajime finds Takarada sitting on the sofa, what he sees is the latter's corpse!
141	"Russian Dolls Murder Case File 3"; Transliteration: "Roshia Ningyō Satsujin Jiken Fairu 3" (Japanese: 「露西亜人形殺人事件」ファイル3)	July 24, 2000
The next target of the murderer is Raimon Yuzuki. She is found strangulated when Scarlet Roses and Hajime come to call her. Hajime tries to solve the trick behind the locked room.
142	"Russian Dolls Murder Case File 4"; Transliteration: "Roshia Ningyō Satsujin Jiken Fairu 4" (Japanese: 「露西亜人形殺人事件」ファイル4)	July 31, 2000
Two more successors get killed and the case becomes dangerous.
143	"Russian Dolls Murder Case File 5"; Transliteration: "Roshia Ningyō Satsujin Jiken Fairu 5" (Japanese: 「露西亜人形殺人事件」ファイル5)	August 7, 2000
The real identity of the "Conductor" is revealed.
144	"Challenge Letter From the Gentleman Thief"; Transliteration: "Kaitō Shinshi Kara no Chōsenjō" (Japanese: 「怪盗紳士からの挑戦状」)	August 14, 2000
An art appraiser gets attacked by someone within a heavily secured estate after receiving a warning notice from the infamous Gentlemen Thief. Later on it is revealed that the culprit was the Art appraiser's assistant who reveals herself to be the rightful owner of the painting that he been trying to sell. She reveals to them that the painting was made by her father, and depicted in the painting is her mother and her younger self. But the greedy appraiser realizing the value of the painting stole the painting hoping to make a profit off of it. Afterward, the gentleman thief is revealed to be one of the many Art curators in disguise. She is thwarted by Kindaichi and surrenders the painting and escapes once more. Later on Kindaichi learns from Kenmochi that a photo proving the painting belonged to the culprit, was sent in anonymously most likely by the Gentleman thief allowing the culprit to take ownership of her father's painting.
145	"Strange Circus Murders File 1"; Transliteration: "Kaiki Sākasu no Satsujin Fairu 1" (Japanese: 「怪奇サーカスの殺人」ファイル1)	August 21, 2000
Inspector Kenmochi takes Hajime, Miyuki and Fumi to go on a holiday to an isle called Akane Island. They find a very suspicious circus on the island. Also, Supt. Akechi meets Dr. Harvard to have a conversation regarding one of his mysterious patients.
146	"Strange Circus Murders File 2"; Transliteration: "Kaiki Sākasu no Satsujin Fairu 2" (Japanese: 「怪奇サーカスの殺人」ファイル2)	August 28, 2000
Ed the Club, one of the clowns in the circus, is found killed under a huge barrel. It is said that the barrels can only be lifted by a giant, specifically Ishikawa the monster. Sam the Spade, another clown, reveals details about an accident which had caused the demise of the circus troupes most famous member, the "MONSTER". He had died when attempting a stunt that involved him escaping from chains wrapped around his body and a fire beneath his feet. However the chemicals were accidentally switched with something flammable that caused the flames to rise much quicker than normal, as he was being burned alive the monster vowed to kill them all. It is also revealed that when the circus members went to get some water to try and douse the flames, Ishikawa the monster had mysteriously disappeared.
147	"Strange Circus Murders File 3"; Transliteration: "Kaiki Sākasu no Satsujin Fairu 3" (Japanese: 「怪奇サーカスの殺人」ファイル3)	September 4, 2000
Sam the Spade is killed by the "MONSTER" in a locked room. Hajime tries to find the killer.
148	"Strange Circus Murders File 4"; Transliteration: "Kaiki Sākasu no Satsujin Fairu 4" (Japanese: 「怪奇サーカスの殺人」ファイル4)	September 11, 2000
The climax of the case begins. Hajime uses a burnt out note with the letters "SNOW" written on it to figure out the identity of the real murderer. The murderer is revealed to be the young Kent and his older sister Noelle. He reveals that the three clowns were the real culprits who murdered his father, mother, and Ishikawa the monster. He learned this fact from Ishikawa's will that he left behind in a time capsule that they had buried together along with his sister when they were younger. Ishikawa had been talking with one of the drunk clowns who accidentally revealed that he and the others murdered Kent and Noelle's mother in cold blood. Their father had learned who the clowns truly were and helped them in exchange for funds to maintain the circus. However they blackmailed him repeatedly and after accidentally killing their mother, they decided to eliminate anyone who knew the truth. Kent as his final act attempts to commit suicide by jumping off the swinging rope. However Kindaichi manages to talk him down, but Kent slips and both of them fall as the other troupe members try to put a safety mattress beneath them. Suddenly an unknown man effortlessly pushes the mattress and saves them. He is revealed to be Ishikawa the monster as well as Dr. Harvey's mysterious patient. Superintendent Akechi reveals that he had survived after falling into the ocean but he lost all his memories, after returning to the circus he regained them just in time to save Kent.

=== Films (1996-1999) ===
No.	English Title Japanese Title	Original release date
1	"The File of Young Kindaichi (Note: The film's official title is just "The File of Young Kindaichi", but an unofficial subtitle "The New Opera House Murders" (「オペラ座館・新たなる殺人」, "Operazakan Arata Naru Satsujin") is often used, which is the name of the original novel that covers this case)" Transliteration: "Kindaichi Shōnen no Jikenbo" (Japanese: 「金田一少年の事件簿」)	December 14, 1996
2	"The File of Young Kindaichi 2: Murderous Deep Blue"; Transliteration: "Kindaichi Shōnen no Jikenbo 2 Satsuriku no Dīpuburū" (Japanese: 「金田一少年の事件簿2 殺戮のディープブルー」)	August 21, 1999

=== TV specials (2007) ===
Two TV specials were produced and aired on Yomiuri TV on November 12 and November 19, 2007.

No.	English Title Japanese Title	Original release date
1	"The Last Opera House Murders"; Transliteration: "Operazakan Saigo no Satsujin" (Japanese: 「オペラ座館・最後の殺人」)	November 12, 2007
Kindaichi, Miyuki and Kenmochi arrive at the condemned opera house in the pouring rain and are met with an ominous announcement from its phantom.
2	"Vampire Legend Murder Case"; Transliteration: "Kyūketsuki Densetsu Satsujin Jiken" (Japanese: 「吸血鬼伝説殺人事件」)	November 19, 2007
On their way to the hot springs, Hajime and his companions get lost in an abandoned village, where they discover a murder case involving vampires.

=== Original video animations (2012-2013) ===
Two special OVA episodes were released with the 20th anniversary of the manga: The first in December 2012 and the second in March 2013.

No.	English Title Japanese Title	Original release date
1	"Black Magic Murder Case (Part One)"; Transliteration: "Kuromajutsu Satsujin Jiken Zenpen" (Japanese: 黒魔術殺人事件（前編）)	December 17, 2012
2	"Black Magic Murder Case (Part Two)"; Transliteration: "Kuromajutsu Satsujin Jiken Kōhen" (Japanese: 黒魔術殺人事件（後編）)	March 15, 2013

=== Kindaichi Case Files R (2014-2016) ===
The Kindaichi Case Files R, also known as Kindaichi Case Files Returns comprises 47 episodes over two seasons.

==== Season 1 ====
No.	English Title Japanese Title	Original release date
1	"The Hong Kong Kowloon Treasure Murder Case File 1"; Transliteration: "Honkon Kūron Zaihō Satsujin Jiken File 1" (Japanese: 香港九龍財宝殺人事件 File.1)	April 5, 2014
Hajime, Miyuki and Saki travel to Hong Kong from a Japanese man as an invitation for taking part in an activity held as "Girly Model Show". Upon their arrival, some time after reaching Hong Kong, A man, Shin Li (新力), carelessly bumps into Miyuki and causes her dress to get dirty. As compensation, Shin takes the trio to a clothes shop for a new dress. However some time later Miyuki disappears from Kindaichi's view, but is later revealed to have been kidnapped. Hajime and Saki go for help but also see a girl that has a striking resemblance to Miyuki, named Yang Ran, in Kowloon Park. They go to a hotel that is holding the model show later where they witness a murder happen in the banquet hall in front of their eyes.
2	"The Hong Kong Kowloon Treasure Murder Case File 2"; Transliteration: "Honkon Kūron Zaihō Satsujin Jiken File 2" (Japanese: 香港九龍財宝殺人事件 File.2)	April 12, 2014
The victim had been poisoned to death by a bowl of soup, and is identified as Chan Yong Fu. At the same night, Shin Li is found deceased in a room, with a big bloody crash on the wall.
3	"The Hong Kong Kowloon Treasure Murder Case File 3"; Transliteration: "Honkon Kūron Zaihō Satsujin Jiken File 3" (Japanese: 香港九龍財宝殺人事件 File.3)	April 19, 2014
Officer Lee implies that a bomb had been hidden somewhere in Hong Kong, so he and Kindaichi go to many places, including an abandoned hospital out of the urban in Tai O, where the corpse of Liu Ivy, the fashion designer of the model show, is found. Miyuki is discovered alive but hurt and is sent to the hospital.
4	"The Hong Kong Kowloon Treasure Murder Case File 4"; Transliteration: "Honkon Kūron Zaihō Satsujin Jiken File 4" (Japanese: 香港九龍財宝殺人事件 File.4)	April 26, 2014
Kindaichi solves the mystery behind the Venomous Dragon, and he tells everybody how the killer murdered the three victims. He reveals the killer to be Ran, who had been posing as Miyuki because of their resemblance. She reveals her motive was to take revenge for her mother, who committed suicide in order to prevent Chan, Shin and Ivy from finding the "Venomous Dragon" treasure. She reveals that she did not have a normal life because she and her mother were always on the run from those three. However when they hid themselves in a certain part of Japan everything seemed fine. Until one day her mother got a phone call from her informant who before dying told her that they have been compromised. Her mother in a last ditch effort tells Ran to live on, and confronted the three treasure hunters. Ran witnessed her mother douse herself in gasoline and set herself on fire to protect her daughter. Ran would eventually encounter the three again after her photo with the tattoo was circulated in a magazine. She vowed to kill them in order to avenge her mother. Afterwards, Miyuki is also found at an apartment, having a simple meal.
5	"Reika Hayami and the Uninvited Guest"; Transliteration: "Hayami Reika to Manekarezaru Kyaku" (Japanese: 速水玲香と招かれざる客)	May 3, 2014
A fugitive who had escaped from prison had secretly stowed away on a luxurious ship that the idol singer, Reika Hayami is on, and he had attacked a fan of Reika in the toilet in order to impersonate him. By sheer coincidence He and Kindaichi answer every question from Reika's contest correctly and wins the opportunity to have tea with Reika, much to Hajime's chagrin. Eventually Hajime deduces that the man is the prisoner who escaped from prison and sets a trap that ends with him being imprisoned once again.
6	"The Alchemy Murder Case File 1"; Transliteration: "Renkinjutsu Satsujin Jiken File 1" (Japanese: 錬金術殺人事件 File.1)	May 10, 2014
Hajime, Miyuki and Reika join a treasure hunt activity. Upon arriving at the Renkin Island, they learn the terrible fact that there is a demented alchemist hiding somewhere in the mansion.
7	"The Alchemy Murder Case File 2"; Transliteration: "Renkinjutsu Satsujin Jiken File 2" (Japanese: 錬金術殺人事件 File.2)	May 17, 2014
The assistant director, Takuya Mayumura is found murdered after everybody finds the wreckage of the boat. It is believed that the Alchemist committed the murder.
8	"The Alchemy Murder Case File 3"; Transliteration: "Renkinjutsu Satsujin Jiken File 3" (Japanese: 錬金術殺人事件 File.3)	May 24, 2014
Fukamori, Onizawa and Fujimori are the next to die in different places inside the mansion.
9	"The Alchemy Murder Case File 4"; Transliteration: "Renkinjutsu Satsujin Jiken File 4" (Japanese: 錬金術殺人事件 File.4)	May 31, 2014
Kindaichi solves the trick used by the murderer and he uses that trick to lure the killer out. The killer in return reveals that three of the four victims that he killed were responsible for driving his younger sister to commit suicide. He reveals that, when he was younger, he and little sister Haruka were in an orphanage together and he was eventually adopted forcing him to leave his sister behind. Years later, he discovered that his sister had become a popular actress and he confirmed this by sending her a letter with a code that they only knew about. She confirmed that she was his sister, and ever since they kept touch and talked via email and phone as much as they could. However, one day his sister called telling him that she had gotten herself in some trouble but told him to believe in her no matter what. Not long after he learned from the news that his sister had committed suicide leaving him devastated, he received a letter from his sister that she sent before she died. In it she revealed that the people she was working with had framed her for drug use and caused her reputation to plummet. After learning the truth he decided to murder them with his own hands. Eventually he is arrested, the crimes of those murdered according to Kindaichi have most likely been exposed. However the gentlemen thief manages to make off with the gold, much to Kindaichi's chagrin.
10	"The Prison Prep School Murder Case File 1"; Transliteration: "Gokumonjuku Satsujin Jiken File 1" (Japanese: 獄門塾殺人事件 File.1)	June 7, 2014
Kindaichi Hajime fails in almost every subjects, so Miyuki decides to send them both to a Prep School named "The Jail Gate". Upon arriving to the headquarters of the school, they find a student named Ren Moroi who has been poisoned, everybody is suspected of murdering him.
11	"The Prison Prep School Murder Case File 2"; Transliteration: "Gokumonjuku Satsujin Jiken File 2" (Japanese: 獄門塾殺人事件 File.2)	June 14, 2014
The classes of the school begin, but five students disappeared mysteriously after they leave the classroom.
12	"The Prison Prep School Murder Case File 3"; Transliteration: "Gokumonjuku Satsujin Jiken File 3" (Japanese: 獄門塾殺人事件 File.3)	June 21, 2014
The five students are found as corpses in different condition around the school camp.
13	"The Prison Prep School Murder Case File 4"; Transliteration: "Gokumonjuku Satsujin Jiken File 4" (Japanese: 獄門塾殺人事件 File.4)	June 28, 2014
Kindaichi tries to find out the killer in the school.
14	"The Prison Prep School Murder Case File 5"; Transliteration: "Gokumonjuku Satsujin Jiken File 5" (Japanese: 獄門塾殺人事件 File.5)	July 5, 2014
The killer's true identity is exposed by Kindaichi. In turn the killer reveals that why she and her accomplice orchestrated the murders. She reveals that a fellow male student who happened to be the son of her accomplice was murdered by her and the five victims they've killed. She was in love with him, but the other five students were jealous of the fact that he was extremely intelligent and always getting high grades. They knew of his preexisting condition and decided to use this against him hoping to make him fall ill. They tricked her into giving him medication that would cause his condition to worsen. But instead it killed him much to their shock, and convinced her that she just as guilty as the rest of them. After meeting with his father, they decided to murder all those responsible for his death.
15	"Murder at 10,000 Meters File 1"; Transliteration: "Kōdo Ichiman Mētoru no Satsujin File 1" (Japanese: 高度一万メートルの殺人 File.1)	July 19, 2014
Hajime, Officer Kenmochi and Miyuki take a flight back to Haneda Airport, but during the trip the pilot is killed when everybody finds him.
16	"Murder at 10,000 Meters File 2"; Transliteration: "Kōdo Ichiman Mētoru no Satsujin File 2" (Japanese: 高度一万メートルの殺人 File.2)	July 26, 2014
The secondary pilot is suspected to be the killer and he is finally arrested.
17	"The Campground "Bizarre" Case"; Transliteration: "Kyanpujō no Kaijiken" (Japanese: キャンプ場の"怪"事件)	August 2, 2014
The plot describes a very bizarre case committed by Hajime Kindaichi when he was 14 years old while during a camp with their mates.
18	"Evil Spirit of the Diving Pool"; Transliteration: "Tobikomi Pūru no Akuryō" (Japanese: 飛込プールの悪霊)	August 9, 2014
Kindaichi and Miyuki are reminded of a case about a diving class when they are drinking at a cafe. When a diver jumped off from the springboard and landed in the water, the splash much larger than normal and she nearly drowned. Luckily she was saved and sent to the hospital for her injuries. Hajime thought that it was a murder planned by another diver because the victim had been mistreated by her. But her classmates revealed that she only acted that way to push her to greater heights as she believed that she had potential. The killer immediately regrets what she did for misunderstanding her friend's intention and breaks down in tears.
19	"Inspector Kenmochi the Killer File 1"; Transliteration: "Kenmochi Keibu no Satsujin File 1" (Japanese: 剣持警部の殺人 File.1)	August 16, 2014
Three culprits involved in a bullying case are released in recent days. However, one of them is attacked with a police revolver.
20	"Inspector Kenmochi the Killer File 2"; Transliteration: "Kenmochi Keibu no Satsujin File 2" (Japanese: 剣持警部の殺人 File.2)	August 23, 2014
The second culprit, Tamaki, is killed by a car bomb when Kindaichi and Miyuki confront him.
21	"Inspector Kenmochi the Killer File 3"; Transliteration: "Kenmochi Keibu no Satsujin File 3" (Japanese: 剣持警部の殺人 File.3)	August 30, 2014
Inspector Kenmochi is suspected for the murders of two young culprits and an attempted murder of Busujima.
22	"Inspector Kenmochi the Killer File 4"; Transliteration: "Kenmochi Keibu no Satsujin File 4" (Japanese: 剣持警部の殺人 File.4)	September 6, 2014
Hajime manages to figure out that the culprit disguised themselves as Inspector Kenmochi in order to commit the murders and frame him in the process. The murderer in a shocking twist is revealed to be one the victims: Busujima. Busujima had killed his supposed accomplices in the heinous case which involved a female college student who was subjected to horrific torture for weeks before being killed. Busujima reveals that he did not hurt her as he was in love with her. When he was studying in a restaurant he met the waitress who worked there, she would comfort him and give him support which caused him to fall in love with her. One day, his two friends had asked to borrow his apartment for a while and he agreed although reluctantly. During that time he found it strange that the waitress hadn't come to work for weeks, but believed that it wasn't anything to worry about. He visited his two friends in his apartment and knew that they had the waitress there, even though they tried to hide her. After he left his apartment he witnessed the waitress jumping out of the window of his apartment to her death. Horrified, he asked what they had done and they convinced him that he was guilty too and together they burned and buried her body. He took the blame for their crimes, but he could never forget what had happened and he orchestrated a murder plan to kill them and frame kenmochi. Kenmochi in turn hits and chastises him for not saving her sooner. Later on, Kindaichi visits Busujima in prison and reveals that the waitress had left a literal dying message. A keychain was found with her body that was actually revealed to be a voice recorder, kindaichi plays it: the waitress says that the two boys were responsible for torturing her and that Busujima is innocent. She always knew how much of a hard worker he was and she knew that he would never do something so horrible to her. Busujima hearing this is relieved and thanks Kindaichi for finally giving him peace.
23	"The Game Mansion Murder Case File 1"; Transliteration: "Gēmu no Yakata Satsujin Jiken File 1" (Japanese: ゲームの館殺人事件 File.1)	September 13, 2014
Kindaichi and Miyuki who are returning from an amusement park hitch a ride on a city bus because it is raining, but they are knocked unconscious and sent to a mysterious game mansion where other people are also present. The game master says that there will be some interesting games that they are going to play for their survival. In the first game, they are tasked with answering questions that appear on a television while wearing masks that are locked on their heads. When they do, a code is given to them to unlock the door to escape the room but they can only leave one at a time. Hajime manages to help most of the people escape from the room, but one of the participants, a woman pushes Kindaichi outside when he tries to help her and is killed by an explosion when she decides to stay in the room.
24	"The Game Mansion Murder Case File 2"; Transliteration: "Gēmu no Yakata Satsujin Jiken File 2" (Japanese: ゲームの館殺人事件 File.2)	September 20, 2014
The deceased is actually Shimomura Shiho, who is wealthy. In the next game, Shiho's son is poisoned and also dies. They are asked to find a key by eating noodles to escape. Everyone escapes and is taken to the next room, where they are told only one will survive. They are to find a key and are to do it without acting like barbarians. Shiho's son locks himself in the bathroom, thinking he has figured out the puzzle only for Kindaichi to break down the door and find him dead after being killed by poisoned spikes that were placed behind a frame with wine labels on them. The room then fills with poison gas causing everyone to fall unconscious, they then regain consciousness in a hospital revealing the gas to have been sleeping gas not poison.
25	"The Game Mansion Murder Case File 3"; Transliteration: "Gēmu no Yakata Satsujin Jiken File 3" (Japanese: ゲームの館殺人事件 File.3)	September 27, 2014
Hajime figures out that this is a murder case targeting the Shimomura's. He figures out who is behind the murders, the person being one of the participants in the survival games. The woman in question had rigged each game to kill both of the Shimomuras in case one of the traps failed to kill them in the previous games. For the first game, 3d glasses were placed inside the masks and for Shiho her glasses were placed upside down in her mask as a result she saw completely different questions on the television as the letters and words became scrambled making it impossible for her to answer any of the questions. When the final question came up, in her eyes it said to push the last person outside the room unknowingly sealing her fate. As for the young man, the reason he reached for the frame was because when he heard the word etiquette during the question, which also means label and the board had wine labels on them. The woman knew that the boy was studying to a sommelier and would immediately figure out what etiquette would mean. The reason the woman did all this was because one of the other participants and her employee was actually her biological daughter. Her daughter was actually related to the Shimomuras and by killing the woman and her son, her daughter would get the inheritance securing her future. She had faked her death and took on a new identity, however by sheer coincidence she was reunited with her daughter after she applied for a job at the bar that she owned. She decided to orchestrate this scheme in order to help her daughter, but she reveals that she's very ill and doesn't have much time left. Later on, it is revealed that the woman had passed away and her daughter had decided to donate the inheritance as she decided to live the way she wants but will never forget her mother.

==== Season 2 ====
No. overall	No. in season	English Title Japanese Title	Original release date
26	1	"The Death March of Young Kindaichi File 1"; Transliteration: "Kindaichi Shōnen no Kesshikō File 1" (Japanese: 金田一少年の決死行 File.1)	October 3, 2015
Takato comes to Hong Kong to help a human being called "The King of the Cave" out of an abandoned building. Kindaichi, Miyuki and Saki goes to HK for the second time for a show featuring "Maskman". They meet Officer Lee (who has appeared in Episode 1-4) in the King Dragon Hotel. In a hotel suite, three Japanese dealers are conversing. Suddenly they have got a box with another group member's hand in it and they realize that this member was killed.
27	2	"The Death March of Young Kindaichi File 2"; Transliteration: "Kindaichi Shōnen no Kesshikō File 2" (Japanese: 金田一少年の決死行 File.2)	October 10, 2015
The female dealer is found dead in the 2nd floor of the hotel. After the show of the Maskman, Hajime is hallucinated and put a knife into Akechi's body, which surprises everybody. In the next day, when two of the three dealers come to the abandoned building, one of them gets killed, and Kindaichi is thought to be the killer again.
28	3	"The Death March of Young Kindaichi File 3"; Transliteration: "Kindaichi Shōnen no Kesshikō File 3" (Japanese: 金田一少年の決死行 File.3)	October 17, 2015
The only dealer in the group is also killed, with Kindaichi being considered as the killer for the 3rd time.
29	4	"The Death March of Young Kindaichi File 4"; Transliteration: "Kindaichi Shōnen no Kesshikō File 4" (Japanese: 金田一少年の決死行 File.4)	October 24, 2015
Kindaichi and Akechi both solve the case after figuring out the truth. Kindaichi reveals that the culprit in a shocking twist is the young boy Jun. Kindaichi had figured this out because when he checked inside the cave where a young boy and his father had been left trapped inside of. He noticed that something essential was missing, the young boy's shoes and combined with the picture that Jun had with him, helped him figure out the truth. This all revealed that although Jun had the appearance of a child, he in reality was a grown adult. A photograph taken of him when he was younger confirmed this, as he looked exactly the same in the photo as he did now. Kindaichi revealed the reason for him not aging physically was because he had been trapped in a dark area and was deprived of sunlight for so long that he remained trapped in his young body. A woman reveals that she knew Jun as they met when they were kids and was the young girl in the photo with him. Jun reveals his motive was that the three people he killed were the ones responsible for trapping him and his father in that dark cavern. His father had been obsessed with finding a treasure from an old war, that supposedly was a large cache of gold bars. One day, he got his opportunity when the hotel where the army had hidden their treasure had burned down in a fire. Jun knew that his father was responsible for the fire, but decided not to say anything and accompanied his father to china to find the treasure. He recruited three of his students from a Japanese university to help him transport the treasure. Eventually, they found the cavern and the treasure, which turned out to be several large crates packed with large gold bars. The three students seeing this, let their greed get the better of them and ambushed both him and his father. They took the gold and trapped him and his father in the dark cavern. His father during his last moments told him to get revenge on the three who trapped them in the cave. During the time he was trapped in the cave, he trained nonstop to fulfill his father's last wishes. Until one day, he was saved by a mysterious person who agreed to help him fulfill his revenge. Jun then reveals that he had fun with Kindaichi, when he was helping him hide and when they were running around avoiding the police. He asks Kindaichi if they are friends and Kindaichi says they already are. Suddenly, one of the people reveals himself to be Takatou Yogiri the puppeteer from hell. He was the one that saved Jun and gave him the murder plan to fulfill his revenge. But seeing as he failed, he causes the lights to go out and hits Jun with a poison dart, before escaping. Later, it is revealed that Jun had survived and was growing normally again.
30	5	"Blood Pool Hall Murder Case File 1"; Transliteration: "Chidamari no Ma Satsujin Jiken File 1" (Japanese: 血溜之間殺人事件 File.1)	October 31, 2015
Hajime and his friends are invited to have a go competition with a rival campus.
31	6	"Blood Pool Hall Murder Case File 2"; Transliteration: "Chidamari no Ma Satsujin Jiken File 2" (Japanese: 血溜之間殺人事件 File.2)	November 7, 2015
One of the rivals is found dead inside the Blood Pool Hall, and everybody finds a message formed by the black-and-white go pieces in the pool. Eventually Kindaichi deduces that a member of the Fudo high Go club is the murderer. He reveals that his motive was that he and his victim had been best friends in the past and had been hoping that they could attend the same prestigious school. But only one of them got in, he had prepared to go to the school but received a phone call that revealed that someone had posed as him and stole his spot in the prestigious school. Because of this his mother who had worked so hard for him, became depressed and eventually committed suicide. Later on he found out his best friend was the one who stole everything from him and as a result decided to kill him for betraying their friendship.
32	7	"Rose Cross Mansion Murder Case File 1"; Transliteration: "Barajūjikan Satsujin Jiken File 1" (Japanese: 薔薇十字館殺人事件 File.1)	November 14, 2015
Hajime and Miyuki go to the Rosenkreuz Mansion with the invitation from Yoichi Takato.
33	8	"Rose Cross Mansion Murder Case File 2"; Transliteration: "Barajūjikan Satsujin Jiken File 2" (Japanese: 薔薇十字館殺人事件 File.2)	November 21, 2015
A dead man is found inside the plates supposed to serve the roast chicken. Koganei gets surprised and tries to escape from the mansion, but is poisoned by the roses.
34	9	"Rose Cross Mansion Murder Case File 3"; Transliteration: "Barajūjikan Satsujin Jiken File 3" (Japanese: 薔薇十字館殺人事件 File.3)	November 28, 2015
Zenda is killed when everybody finds her.
35	10	"Rose Cross Mansion Murder Case File 4"; Transliteration: "Barajūjikan Satsujin Jiken File 4" (Japanese: 薔薇十字館殺人事件 File.4)	December 5, 2015
36	11	"Rose Cross Mansion Murder Case File 5"; Transliteration: "Barajūjikan Satsujin Jiken File 5" (Japanese: 薔薇十字館殺人事件 File.5)	December 12, 2015
37	12	"A Gunshot at 4:40 a.m." Transliteration: "Gozen Yoji Yonjuppun no Jūsei" (Japanese: 午前4時40分の銃声)	December 19, 2015
A gunshot is heard at 4:40 a.m. in an apartment in Tokyo. The dead is identified as a female inspector from the Police Department. Kenmochi feels worried about the case. Kindaichi suspects this is a suicide rather than a homicide.
SP	SP (Note: This is a special episode)	"The Case File of Inspector Akechi"; Transliteration: "Akechi Keibu no Jikenbo" (Japanese: 明智警部の事件簿)	December 26, 2015
38	13	"Snow Goblin Legend Murder Case File 1"; Transliteration: "Yukioni Densetsu Satsujin Jiken File 1" (Japanese: 雪鬼伝説殺人事件 File.1)	January 23, 2016
Hajime and Miyuki go to the Snow Goblin Hill in Akita Prefecture to work for the Ski Resort founded by the CEO of Web Thread.
39	14	"Snow Goblin Legend Murder Case File 2"; Transliteration: "Yukioni Densetsu Satsujin Jiken File 2" (Japanese: 雪鬼伝説殺人事件 File.2)	January 30, 2016
One of the college students disappears mysteriously when Hajime, Miyuki and Tsukimizato go to her cottage.
40	15	"Snow Goblin Legend Murder Case File 3"; Transliteration: "Yukioni Densetsu Satsujin Jiken File 3" (Japanese: 雪鬼伝説殺人事件 File.3)	February 6, 2016
41	16	"Snow Goblin Legend Murder Case File 4"; Transliteration: "Yukioni Densetsu Satsujin Jiken File 4" (Japanese: 雪鬼伝説殺人事件 File.4)	February 13, 2016
42	17	"A Female Physician's Bizarre Plan"; Transliteration: "Joi no Kimyō na Takurami" (Japanese: 女医の奇妙な企み)	February 20, 2016
43	18	"The Mystery of the Disappeared Gold Medal"; Transliteration: "Kieta Kinmedaru no Nazo" (Japanese: 消えた金メダルの謎)	February 27, 2016
44	19	"Kitsunebi Drifting Murder Case File 1"; Transliteration: "Kitsunebinagashi Satsujin Jiken File 1" (Japanese: 狐火流し殺人事件 File.1)	March 5, 2016
Hajime and Miyuki receive a telegram saying that their old elementary school-mate, Tsukie Marika gets killed, so they go to the "Whitefox Village" for paying their mates from the "Adventuring 10-men Team" a visit. One of them called Rin says that she found Marika dead wearing a "Fox Mask" with white cloth in her warehouse two months ago, and the telegrams might be tricks from a mate. Everybody goes to a dock where a special kind of lanterns must be put in the water, and they memorize for the dead with the lanterns drifting away to a further place (Kitsunebi Drifting). After the ceremony, two of the mates buy flowers and snacks from the town, however Koutarou doesn't come and accompany with them, but is found as a corpse from a gumboat which the 10 members had used with the "Fox Mask" on his face!
45	20	"Kitsunebi Drifting Murder Case File 2"; Transliteration: "Kitsunebinagashi Satsujin Jiken File 2" (Japanese: 狐火流し殺人事件 File.2)	March 12, 2016
Koutarou is found dead, which surprises everybody. Unluckily, Rin, who had told that Marika is killed, is again found dead in her house with after being stabbed by the killer.
46	21	"Kitsunebi Drifting Murder Case File 3"; Transliteration: "Kitsunebinagashi Satsujin Jiken File 3" (Japanese: 狐火流し殺人事件 File.3)	March 19, 2016
Hajime tries to discover the murderer.
47	22	"Kitsunebi Drifting Murder Case File 4"; Transliteration: "Kitsunebinagashi Satsujin Jiken File 4" (Japanese: 狐火流し殺人事件 File.4)	March 26, 2016
The killer who murdered the three mates is revealed.
