= Miho Komatsu discography =

- Studio albums: 8
- Soundtrack albums: 1
- Compilation albums: 3
- Singles: 26

Miho Komatsu is a Japanese singer-songwriter, record producer and lyricist who recorded eight studio albums, 26 singles, and three compilation album from 1997–2006.

== Studio albums ==
List of studio albums, with selected chart positions
| Title | Album information | Oricon peak position |
|---|---|---|
| "Nazo" (謎) | Released: December 3, 1997; Label: Amemura-O-Town Record; Catalog No.: AOCS-1001 | 5 |
| "Mirai" (未来) | Released: December 19, 1998; Label: Amemura-O-Town Record; Catalog No.: AOCS-1003 | 3 |
| everywhere | Released: February 16, 2000; Label: Giza Studio; Catalog No.: GZCA-1022 | 5 |
| A thousand feelings | Released: March 7, 2001; Label: Giza Studio; Catalog No.: GZCA-1064 | 9 |
| source | Released: September 25, 2002; Label: Giza Studio; Catalog No.: GZCA-5020 | 23 |
| "Hanano" (花野) | Released: September 25, 2003; Label: Giza Studio; Catalog No.: GZCA-5034 | 27 |
| prime number | Released: January 26, 2005; Label: Giza Studio; Catalog No.: GZCA-5062 | 30 |
| a piece of cake | Released: April 26, 2006; Label: Giza Studio; Catalog No.: GZCA-5062 | 34 |

== Compilation albums ==
List of compilation albums, with selected chart positions
| Title | Album information | Oricon peak position |
|---|---|---|
| Miho Komatsu Wonderful World: Single Remixes & More; 1st remix album | Released: November 27, 2002; Label: Giza Records; Catalog No.: GZCA-5023 | 20 |
| lyrics 1st ballad selection album | Released: November 26, 2003; Label: Giza Records; Catalog No. GZCA-5043 | 45 |
| Miho Komatsu Best ~once more~ | Released: November 21, 2006; Label: Giza Records; Catalog No.: GZCA-5096/7 | 21 |

== Singles ==
List of singles, with selected chart positions
| Releasing date | Title | Oricon peak position | Total sales | Album |
|---|---|---|---|---|
| May 28, 1997 | "Nazo" (謎) | 9 | 325,850 | Nazo |
| September 25, 1997 | "Kagayakeru Hoshi" (輝ける星) | 20 | 47,850 | Nazo |
| January 14, 1998 | "Negai goto Hitotsu dake" (願い事ひとつだけ) | 8 | 294,580 | Mirai |
| March 18, 1998 | "anybody's game" | 9 | 98,990 | Mirai |
| August 19, 1998 | "Chance" (チャンス) | 3 | 141,240 | Mirai |
| October 14, 1998 | "Kōri no ue ni Tatsu yō ni" (氷の上に立つように) | 5 | 162,420 | Mirai |
| March 3, 1999 | "Sayonara no Kakera" (さよならのかけら) | 17 | 58,540 | everywhere |
| May 8, 1999 | "Saitan Kyori de" (最短距離で) | 16 | 37,140 | everywhere |
| June 30, 1999 | "Kaze ga Soyogu Basho" (風がそよぐ場所) | 9 | 52,650 | everywhere |
| June 21, 2000 | "Anata ga Iru kara" (あなたがいるから) | 9 | 55,900 | A thousand feelings |
| October 18, 2000 | "Kimi no Me ni wa Utsuranai" (君の瞳には映らない) | 19 | 20,000 | A thousand feelings |
| January 31, 2001 | "Love gone" | 26 | 23,000 | A thousand feelings |
| May 30, 2001 | "Todomaru Koto no nai Ai" (とどまることのない愛) | 22 | 16,110 | source |
| August 8, 2001 | "Saigo no Toride" (さいごの砦) | 30 | 15,360 | source |
| December 5, 2001 | "Aishiteru..." (愛してる) | 28 | 11,860 | source |
| May 29, 2002 | "dance" | 28 | 10,860 | source |
| November 27, 2002 | "mysterious love" | 16 | 11,469 | Hanano |
| March 19, 2003 | "Futari no Negai" (ふたりの願い) | 30 | 7,530 | Hanano |
| June 25, 2003 | "Watashi Sagashi" (私さがし) | 30 | 7,413 | Hanano |
| November 26, 2003 | "Tsubasa wa Nakutemo" (翼はなくても) | 30 | 6,278 | prime number |
| April 28, 2004 | "Namida Kirari Tobase" (涙キラリ飛ばせ) | 31 | 6,670 | prime number |
| July 28, 2004 | "Suna no Shiro" (砂のしろ) | 32 | 5,796 | prime number |
| October 20, 2004 | "I~Dareka" (I～誰か) | 29 | 6,856 | prime number |
| May 18, 2005 | "I just wanna hold you tight" | 36 | 6,932 | a piece of cake |
| August 17, 2005 | "Anata Iro" (あなた色) | 38 | 4,740 | a piece of cake |
| December 7, 2005 | "Koi ni Nare..." (恋になれ) | 39 | 4,931 | a piece of cake |
