= Lyrics (Miho Komatsu album) =

lyrics

Compilation album Concept album by Miho Komatsu
- Released: 26 November 2003
- Recorded: 1997–2003
- Genre: Japanese pop
- Length: 71:28
- Label: Giza Studio
- Producer: Miho Komatsu (Executive Producer : KANONJI ROCKAKU)

Miho Komatsu chronology
Miho Komatsu 6th : Hanano (2003)	lyrics (2003)	Miho Komatsu 7 : prime number (2005)

lyrics is the first and only concept album by Japanese singer-songwriter Miho Komatsu. It was released on 26 November 2003 by Giza Studio.

Album includes tracks from previously released albums and couplings from singles based on the voting polls by the fans. Two songs (track #13 and #15) received new arrangements exclusively for this album. The album was released on same day as her single Tsubasa wa Nakutemo and her first essay book Hen na Monosashi.

The album reached No. 45 in its first week on the charts selling 8,184 copies. The album charted for three weeks and sold more than 10,709 copies.

== Track listing ==
All lyrics are written by Miho Komatsu; all music is composed by Miho Komatsu

No.	Title	Arrangers	Length
1.	"Tada Soba ni Itai no (ただ傍にいたいの)" (4th studio album A thousand feelings)	Yoshinobu Ohga	4:08
2.	"alive" (1st studio album Nazo)	Hirohito Furui (Garnet Crow)	4:27
3.	"Kanashii Koi (哀しい恋)" (10 single's coupling song)	Ohga	3:55
4.	"Ame ga Furu Tabi ni (雨が降る度に)" (3rd studio album "everywhere")	Masato Kitano; Kūron Oshiro	4:47
5.	"BOY FRIEND" (7th single's coupling song)	Furui	4:20
6.	"regret" (4th studio album A thousand feelings)	Ohga	4:53
7.	"Tegotae no Nai Ai (手ごたえのない愛)" (2nd studio album "Mirai", originally performed by Deen)	Furui	5:04
8.	"Bokura no Yukue (僕らの行方)" (16th single's coupling song)	Ohga	4:56
9.	"commune with you" (5th studio album "source")	Ohga	5:32
10.	"One Side Love" (6th single's coupling song)	Furui	4:47
11.	"glass" (13th single's coupling song)	Masato Kitano; Kūron Oshiro	4:28
12.	"I don't know the truth" (4th studio album A thousand feelings)	Ohga	4:55
13.	"My destination...(lyrics ver. mix)" (8th single's coupling song)	Daisuke Ikeda	4:21
14.	"Yume to Genjitsu no Hazama (夢と現実の狭間)" (3rd studio album "everywhere")	Oshiro	5:21
15.	"As (lyrics ver. mix)" (3rd studio album "everywhere")	Takeshi Hayama	5:42
Total length:			71:28
