= List of MÄR episodes =

This article lists the episodes attributed to the anime version of MÄR: Märchen Awakens Romance. It aired in Japan between April 2005 and March 25, 2007, containing 102 episodes. The anime of MAR is an oddity among most anime in that it continued long after the manga had ended. Rather than follow what was originally set by the author, the anime expanded upon the source material by adding additional battles during the climax and having a somewhat different ending. The anime was licensed by Viz Media and aired on Cartoon Network's online broadband service Toonami Jetstream and, for a limited time, on their television programming block Toonami, until they stopped airing it for unknown reasons.

There are two firms known to have released the DVDs of the anime: Shogakukan for the Japanese DVDs and Viz Media for the English DVDs. In the Japanese DVDs, the original 102 episodes were divided into 17 DVDs, 3 episodes for each and 2 episodes for the 1st and 18th discs. There were also two extra merchandises in the 8th and 9th volumes. From episode 51, the DVDs were released as 'DVD Z'. The English DVDs were released on June 12, 2007, with 4 episodes for each DVD and a running time of 92 minutes. Four volumes were released, consisting of 16 episodes in total.

As of 2008, MÄR DVDs were delisted from distribution. According to Viz Media's spokesperson, this was done to make room for other titles' releases.

Twelve pieces of music were used throughout the series, four openings and eight endings. The four openings themes are The Heaven That Collects The Dreams You Imagined (君の思い描いた夢 集メル HEAVEN, Kimi no Omoi Egaita Yume Atsumeru Heaven) from episode 1 to 31, Clear Weather Clock (晴れ時計, Hare Tokei) from 32 to 53, Dreams and Fireworks (夢·花火, Yume Hanabi) from 54 to 80, and The Wind and the Rainbow (風とRAINBOW, Kaze to RAINBOW) from 81 to 102. All of them are composed by the group Garnet Crow.

The eight pieces of music are I Just Wanna Hold You Tight by Miho Komatsu from episodes 1 to 14, I'm In A Bad Mood (不機嫌になる私, Fukigen ni Naru Watashi) by Sayuri Iwata from episodes 15 to 27, Everyday Adventure (毎日アドベンチャー, Mainichi Adobenchā) by Sparkling Point from episodes 28 to 40, Cherry Blossom Colored (桜色, Sakurairo) by Shiori Takei from episodes 41 to 53, Miracle by Rina Aiuchi from episodes 54 to 66, Tonight, in Eden's Corner (今宵エデンの片隅で, Koyoi Eden no Katasumi De) by Garnet Crow from episodes 67 to 78, Don't Make My Heart Tremble Anymore (もう心揺れたりしないで, Mō kokoro yuretari shinaide) by Aiko Kitahara from episodes 79 to 90, and If I Reach Out My Hands (この手を伸ばせば, Kono te o Nobaseba) by Garnet Crow from episodes 91 to 102.

== Episode list ==
Season	Episodes	Originally released	
Season	Episodes	First released	Last released
1	31	April 3, 2005	October 30, 2005
2	22	November 6, 2005	April 9, 2006
3	27	April 16, 2006	October 15, 2006
4	22	October 22, 2006	March 25, 2007

=== Season 1 ===
No.	Title	Original release date
1	"Open! The Door to Another World!!"; Transliteration: "Ake! Isekai no Tobira!!" (Japanese: 開け!異世界の扉!!)	April 3, 2005
Ginta Toramizu, an otaku-ish high school student, has had his 102nd dream of a fantasy world that goes by the name of MÄR-Heaven, and is subsequently subjected to many jeers from his classmates because of that, save for his childhood friend Koyuki. One day when he is briefing her on his newest dream, a phantom clown appears and claims him as the chosen Earth dweller to be permitted entrance into that very same wonderland. His embarkment into MÄR-Heaven is greeted by the meeting with a mysterious, beautiful witch named Dorothy and primary knowledge of the powerful magical artifacts existing worldwide – the ÄRMs.
2	"Babbo: The Legendary ÄRM!"; Transliteration: "Densetsu no Āmu! Babbo!!" (Japanese: 伝説のアーム!バッボ!!)	April 10, 2005
After aiding Dorothy on her ÄRM hunt, Ginta's forfeited the ownership of the dormant legendary ÄRM Babbo, a sentient weapon that is just as vexing as it is fabled. Ginta's and Babbo's bickering eventually leads to their newly founded company crumbling, landing Babbo in the hands of two ÄRM thief con men, Moku and Chapu. However their identity is quickly exposed, and after Ginta forcibly reclaims Babbo, the two reconcile.
3	"Jack's Battle Shovel in Action!"; Transliteration: "Jakku! Batoru Sukoppu Hatsudō!!" (Japanese: ジャック!バトルスコップ発動!!)	April 17, 2005
Ginta's traveling leads him to the house of Jack, a father-orphaned farmer of Ginta's age living with his hospitable mom. They befriend each other after the two vagrants help him outfight the Rogelu brothers, two werewolves terrorizing Jack's farming, and Jack decides to accompany Ginta on his way to find a way back to Earth.
4	"Lost and Found Babbo!"; Transliteration: "Ginta! Babbo o Torikaese!!" (Japanese: ギンタ!バッボを取り返せ!!)	April 24, 2005
The trio arrives at Pezu, a small town where Jack does his trading. As their efforts to search out the occult clown Dimension ÄRM turn fruitless, more trouble's to come: Ginta's again robbed of Babbo by the Stanley bandit. When the boy fights to recover his ÄRM, one unlikely hand of help extends from Alviss, a mysterious yet hostile boy introducing himself as the one who summoned Ginta to MÄR-Heaven using the "Monban Piero" clown ÄRM.
5	"Alviss, The Mysterious Young Man!"; Transliteration: "Nazo no Bishōnen, Aruvisu" (Japanese: 謎の美少年、アルヴィス)	May 1, 2005
Alviss' arrival brings a dark secret to light: the existence of a rebellious military faction known as the Chess Pieces army, which 6 years ago came within an ace of conquering MÄR-Heaven before it was quelled by the world's guardians, the Cross Guard soldiers; and the need to dispose of Babbo due to its gory history of massacring people alongside the Chess un-dead commander, Phantom. Much persuasion, and even retaliation (though vain) is needed from Ginta to change Alviss' mind, including a promise to get stronger. Meanwhile, in a lightning-zapped graveyard, one bevy of masked warriors salutes a man, seemingly resurrected from inside his tomb, whom they addresses as 'no.1 Knight Phantom'.
6	"Snow: The Young Girl Inside the Ice"; Transliteration: "Kōri no Naka no Shōjo, Sunō" (Japanese: 氷の中の少女、スノウ)	May 8, 2005
Soon after the confrontation with Alviss, Ginta & co. encounter Edward, a small dog-man introducing himself as the custodian of Snow, a princess currently fleeing from her stepmother queen, an insatiable woman who, out of desire for the world's throne, makes attempts on her stepdaughter's life to reign over the entire kingdom. On Edward's request to rescue the princess, who at the moment is dying inside a frosted palace, Ginta discovers that the girl bears an exact resemblance to his Earth friend Koyuki, and the minions Ian and Loco that the queen sends after the princess turn out to be none others than Chess Pieces.
7	"Awaken: Meet the Other Ed!"; Transliteration: "Mezame yo! Mō Hitori no Edo!!" (Japanese: 目覚めよ!もう一人のエド!!)	May 15, 2005
Ginta's clash with one of the two Chess Pieces, Ian, tends to favour the latter as Ginta's far too inexperienced and unequipped for the use of Babbo. As the situation necessitates it, Edward reverts to his second form, Alan, a man with yet to be revealed identity but much dreaded by the Chess members, buying Ginta enough time to unfreezes Snow and (accidentally) exchanges a kiss with her. In the middle of the confusion, Halloween, a Knight of the Chess Pieces – an acquaintance with whom Alan stays in discordance – arrives to summon his subordinates back for the Chess Pieces' official issuing of war declaration against MÄR-Heaven.
8	"Phantom: The Undead Knight!"; Transliteration: "Fukkatsu no Naito Fantomu" (Japanese: 復活のナイト·ファントム)	May 22, 2005
Phantom, the 'no.1 Knight' zombie from the resurrection assembles all Chess Pieces warriors in the hall of a levitating castle and loses no time raising his men's esprit de corps with the long-awaited declaration of the 2nd Marchen war. At the same time, Ginta's gang meets with Dorothy; and Alan sends all four of them into the training dimension of "Training Gate" (Shuuren no mon) for a quick fighting coaching, knowing time's running out.
9	"The Training Gate: Merilo and Bumoru!"; Transliteration: "Shūren no Mon, Meriro to Bumoru" (Japanese: 修練の門、メリロとブモル)	May 29, 2005
Inside the Gates, Ginta and Snow, Dorothy and Jack, each group greets their respective training navigator Meriro (a soft-spoken, cute nekomimi) and Bumolu (a dumpy and foul-mouthed bearwoman) and enters their training session: Ginta learns of the truth behind Babbo's fame as a legendary ÄRM – the ability to metamorphose into 8 powerful versions, and Jack gets his incapable scoop ÄRM upgraded with Dorothy's magic stones. Outside, Alan accosts the aforementioned Alviss, whom he recognises as a fellow Cross Guard member 6 years ago, though was a child at that time.
10	"The Second Great War Begins!"; Transliteration: "Dainiji Meruhevun Taisen" (Japanese: 第二次メルヘヴン大戦)	June 5, 2005
As sunset dawns, the Chess Pieces soldiers, with Phantom assuming their command, grace their returned heyday by showering the whole MÄR-Heaven in a mass blood-bath. The emergency transmitted by Cross Guard troops throughout the world reaches Alan and Alviss as they discuss whether Ginta's potential can outdo the late Cross Guard general (also one man from Earth world), and Alviss departs in a hurry after scowling Alan for remaining on his post beside the Training Gate when MÄR-Heaven's in dire need of his help.
11	"Babbo Version 2!"; Transliteration: "Misete yaru! Babbo Bājon 2" (Japanese: 見せてやる!バッボ·バージョン②)	June 12, 2005
Just before the 180-day deadline reaches its end, Ian uncovers their training spot and battles a physically deteriorated Alan to advance on Ginta's dimension. The trainees finish their session just in time to fend the Rook off, and Ginta settles their duel with a win, using v.2 of Babbo Bubble Launcher.
12	"Nanashi: Chief of Luberia!"; Transliteration: "Ruberia no Bosu, Nanashi" (Japanese: ルベリアのボス、ナナシ)	June 19, 2005
Now with Dorothy on their side, there lacks two more members to incorporate team MÄR which, according to Snow, will defend MÄR-Heaven in the Cross Guard's stead. On their way to Hild continent, Ginta & co. are ambushed by Luberia, MÄR-Heaven's most prestigious thief guild. Therefrom they meet and ally with Luberia's captain, Nanashi, whom turns out to be seeking after a man from Chess responsible for the assault at Luberia's base fort just before the war. In the faraway Lestava castle, the news of Ian's punishment for disobedience to command reaches him, his girlfriend Gido (also his companion on the search for Ginta) is to be executed in his place. Meanwhile on Earth, Ginta's mother is depressed about his absence, but Koyuki comes over daily to relieve her with the experience she has via her counterpart, Snow.
13	"Nanashi VS Orco at the Underground Lake!"; Transliteration: "Chitei Mizuumi no Tatakai! Nanashi VS Oruko!!" (Japanese: 地底湖の戦い!ナナシVSオルコ!!)	June 26, 2005
Now accompanied by Nanashi, MÄR arrives in Vestry, a coastal village wrecked after a Chess' carnage and divides their numbers to help the people and exile the Chess away from that part of the continent. Ginta later befriends Tom, a (self-claimed) native young boy habitué of the haunted Vestry cave while on the other side of the underground route, Dorothy & Nanashi encounters a Chess Bishops-ranked homicidal brute, Orco, and Dorothy's for the first time overawed at Nanashi's prowess.
14	"Babbo Version 3: Gargoyle!"; Transliteration: "Babbo Bājon 3! Dete Koi Gāgoiru!!" (Japanese: バッボ·バージョン③! 出て来いガーゴイル!!)	July 3, 2005
Ginta's 2nd Chess adversary introduces himself as another Bishop-ranked psycho, Girom. Granting the request of the cave ghosts, Ginta resorts to his powerful v.3 Babbo Guardian ÄRM, Gargoyle, and defeats Girom, blasts the cave's blockade, setting the ghost free. In return, they presents him a key and a magic stone as a token of gratitude. Observing the scene, Tom switches off his façade and reverts to be the genuine Phantom, killing the loser Orco as he leaves.
15	"John Peach: The Seventh Team Member?"; Transliteration: "7 nin Me no Nakama? Jon Pīchi!?" (Japanese: 7人目の仲間?ジョン·ピーチ!?)	July 10, 2005
A filler episode. Ginta's team runs into John Peach, a loudmouthed boy claiming himself to be the hero that shall save MÄR-Heaven from under the Chess Pieces claws. He steals (thinking he's earned it) gold from some thieves who happens to have a strong spider ÄRM (who he later gets by accident). Peach, thinking he's the hero, challenges Ginta to a match which Snow later says will be a race. Stupid things happen, and Dorothy later explains that the spider ÄRM is really rare since no one uses it, because the spider is uncontrollable and to stop it, it has to eat the user. Peach activates it, and much to his avail, almost gets eaten by it. Ginta saves the day, and Peach says he'll get stronger.
16	"The War Games Commence"; Transliteration: "Wō Gēmu Kaishi" (Japanese: ウォーゲーム開始)	July 17, 2005
In Vestry and throughout the world of MÄR-Heaven, the Chess' announcement of the War Game rings like death knell, gathering all its adversaries to Reginrave castle, stage of the preliminary round. However, aside from Ginta's MÄR team and Alviss of Cross Guard, none of the salvaged fighters gets out of it alive.
17	"First Battle: Alviss Vs. Leno!"; Transliteration: "1st Batoru (1)! Aruvisu VS Reno!!" (Japanese: 1STバトル①!アルヴィスVSレノ!!)	July 24, 2005
1st Round, 1st battle, Reginrave castle stage, Alviss wins his first victory against a Rook named Leno Rodokin. His Cross Guard past as a child is brought into light, including his fatal first meeting with Phantom, which has resulted him his cursed blemish, the Zombie Tattoo.
18	"First Battle, Part 2: Jack Vs. Pano!"; Transliteration: "1st Batoru (2)! Jakku VS Pano!!" (Japanese: 1STバトル②!ジャックVSパノ!!)	July 31, 2005
1st Round, 2nd battle, Reginrave castle stage, Jack against Leno's Rook sister Pano Rodokin. The battle ends a comical loss on Jack's part.
19	"Captain Ginta and Gargoyle Vs. Garon!!"; Transliteration: "Kyaputen Ginta! Gāgoiru VS Garon" (Japanese: キャプテン·ギンタ!ガーゴイルVSガロン)	August 7, 2005
1st Round,3rd battle, Reginrave castle stage, Ginta vs. Garon Rodokin, the Bishop father of the previous Rook siblings. The utilization of his invincible Guardian Gargoyle brings about Garon's ultimate defeat.
20	"Back to the Training Gate! Learn How to Really Fight!"; Transliteration: "Shūren no Mon Futatabi! Kenka no Yarikata Oshiemasu" (Japanese: 修練の門再び!ケンカのやり方教えます)	August 14, 2005
As the meaning of resemblance between Ginta and the Cross Guard former captain Danna dawns on him, Gaira summons him and Jack back to the Training Gate. Meanwhile, Ian approaches Phantom and requests the same, Ginta's true capacity has precipitated the time he carries out his vow: to kill Ginta and Gido's punishment executor.
21	"The Desert Field and the Fighting Princess!"; Transliteration: "Sabaku Fīrudo! Tatakau O-himesama" (Japanese: 砂漠フィールド!闘うお姫様)	August 21, 2005
2nd Round, 1st battle, desert stage, Snow of MÄR and Fuugi of Chess Pieces duel. Snow's giant Snowman "Yuki-chan" slams quickly crush Fugi and his geographically advantageous Wind Arm.
22	"Nanashi vs Loco and the Straw Doll!"; Transliteration: "Nanashi VS Roko! Noroi no Wara Ningyō" (Japanese: ナナシVSロコ!呪いのワラ人形)	August 28, 2005
2nd Round, 2nd battle, desert stage, Nanashi vs. Loco. The Rook's mastery of Darkness ÄRMs corners Nanashi (in its physical literality) into a paralytic position. Though he manages to beat his way out of it without killing the girl, the excruciating pain from her voodoo tools takes it toll and he loses.
23	"Dorothy: A Witch to be Feared!"; Transliteration: "Osorubeki Majo! Doroshī" (Japanese: 恐るべき魔女!ドロシー)	September 4, 2005
2nd Round, 3rd battle, desert stage, Dorothy against Maira. Ignorant of his opponent's magic kingdom nationality and her inhumane notoriety, the Bishop challenges Dorothy with his amoeba Guardian Vacua, only to be devoured altogether by her Guardian dog Toto.
24	"Phantom's Hidden Joy"; Transliteration: "Fantomu no Hisoyaka na Tanoshimi" (Japanese: ファントムの密やかな楽しみ)	September 11, 2005
On the night before the 3rd Battle, Ginta runs into "Tom", who with the Chess Pieces hot at his heels, beseeches the boy's help. However the hunter (who turns out to be Peta) outwits both, and kills "Tom" right in front of Ginta. Leaving the boy with his wrath provoked, Phantom returns from his framed "death" with his head high; Ginta's bound to give all out against the Chess in the future, given they've murdered a 'friend' he's promised protection.
25	"Alan: the Man Who Came Late!"; Transliteration: "Okuretekita Otoko! Aran" (Japanese: 遅れて来た男! アラン)	September 18, 2005
3rd Round, 1st battle, volcano stage, Alan wakes from his slumber inside Edward to combat the Rook Alibaba, who deliberately spars with Cross Guard's 2nd-in-command to ascend to Knight class. With little effort, he obliterates the presumptuous tyro's Guardian Genie's Lamp, showing him his place, and casually tosses him into the volcano for his disrespect.
26	"Show Your Stuff, Jack: Funky Fungi"; Transliteration: "Otoko o Miseru ze Jakku! Mahō no Kinoko!!" (Japanese: 男を見せるぜジャック! 魔法のキノコ!)	September 25, 2005
3rd Round, 2nd battle, volcano stage, Jack vs. Pano rematch. Jack's continuous trainings come to fruition; his hallucinatory toadstools triumph over her primal Weapon ÄRM, and inadvertently earn him her affection in the process.
27	"Snow at the Volcano Mountain Range Field"; Transliteration: "Watashi, Make nai yo! Kazan Gun no Sunou!!" (Japanese: 私、負けないよ!火山群のスノウ!!)	October 2, 2005
3rd Round, 3rd battle, volcano stage, Snow vs. the Bishop pirate Mr.Hook. Though she fights with courage, the heated battlefield gains Mr. Hook an upper hand against her ice-elemental ÄRMs, and her drastically halved magic power eventually fails her.
28	"Accursed Candle! Ginta Vs. Kannochi!"; Transliteration: "Noroi no Rōsoku! Ginta VS Kanocchi" (Japanese: 呪いのロウソク!ギンタVSカノッチ)	October 9, 2005
3rd Battle, 4th round, volcano stage, Ginta against Kannochi. The Bishop's shrewd deployment of his Body Candle ÄRM lands Ginta in a deadly crisis, but the boy's timing summon of his Holy Guardian Alice quickly turns the table, inflicting the curse back upon Kannochi in his place.
29	"Another Zombie Tattoo! Alviss VS Rolan!!"; Transliteration: "Mō Hitotsu no Zonbi Tatū??! Aruvisu VS Roran" (Japanese: もうひとつのゾンビタトゥー!アルヴィスVSロラン)	October 16, 2005
3rd Battle, 5th round, volcano stage, Alviss spars with the adolescent – albeit proficient in the field of explosive Nature ÄRM – Rolan of the Knights, only to find out that while he's not the only one bearing the Tattoo curse of immortality, he appears to be the unique to harbor grudge against it. That shock from which he has no time to recover and Rolan's ceaseless blows simultaneously exhausts Alviss of magic power, beating him hors de combat.
30	"Phantom and the Zodiac Knights"; Transliteration: "Senritsu! Fantomu to Zodiakku no Naito" (Japanese: 戦慄!ファントムとゾディアックのナイト)	October 23, 2005
MÄR's victorious choir is soon to be silenced as they return to the Reginrave castle base just to find Phantom and his Zodiac Knights ready on the welcome spot. Ginta uses Alice, Babbo's Holy ÄRM form, to break Edward and Alan's curse. Unfortunately, Alice cannot cure Alviss' Zombie Tattoo.
31	"Shadow Battles! Gargoyle Vs. the Dark Gargoyle!"; Transliteration: "Shadō Batoru! Gāgoiru VS Burakku Gāgoiru" (Japanese: シャドーバトル!ガーゴイルVSブラックガーゴイル)	October 30, 2005
As the Knights' official introduction heralds their participation in incoming battles, all member of MÄR (with exclusion to Snow, who needs to rest due to her being weakened at her last fight (although she convinces Alan to let her go later anyway), and the newly Edward-split Alan) are to again hone their skills in the Shadowman "Shadow fight" of the Training Gate.

=== Season 2 ===
No. overall	No. in season	Title	Original release date
32	1	"The Quiet Fighting Spirit...Alviss' Power!"; Transliteration: "Shizuka naru Tōshi... Aruvisu no Chikara" (Japanese: 静かなる闘志...アルヴィスの力)	November 6, 2005
4th Battle, 1st round, ice field stage, Alviss vs. Mr. Hook. The "Shadow battle" has augmented his prowess to an extent to be marvelled at; without using any of his ÄRM Alviss gradually disposes of Mr. Hook's ÄRMs, and for this defacement the Bishop meets with death sentence at the hand of his team leader, the deranged Knight Rapunzel.
33	2	"Team MÄR on the Ropes"; Transliteration: "Dō naru Jakku! Dō suru Doroshī" (Japanese: どうなるジャック!どうするドロシー)	November 13, 2005
4th Battle, 2nd round, ice field stage, Jack vs. Korekkio and it is the wits of the former that earn him his victory, while condemning the latter to the late Mr. Hook's fate. 4th Battle, 3rd round, ice field stage, Dorothy defeats the Bishop Avrute with such swiftness that it spares him no time to counterattack, much less to salvage a chance for his life in the game of Janken with Rapunzel.
34	3	"Aqua, Akko and the Nanashi Method"; Transliteration: "Akua to Akko-chan to Nanashi-ryū!" (Japanese: アクアとアッコちゃんとナナシ流)	November 20, 2005
4th Battle, 4th round, ice field stage, Nanashi vs. Aqua. Although his thunder mastery overwhelmingly dominates her aquatic monsters, again it is his gentleman instincts that prevail; being witness to the fates of her unfortunate teammates, Nanashi deliberately pulls the fight a draw. However Rapunzel and her brother Girom are not blind, and even winning the rock-paper-scissor match, they still impale the little girl dead, much to Nanashi's horror. Ginta, full of rage, jumps in and attacks Girom for what he did.
35	4	"Girom Counterattacks! Egola vs. Gargoyle!"; Transliteration: "Gyakushū no Giromu! Egora VS Gāgoiru" (Japanese: 逆襲のギロム!エゴラVSガーゴイル)	November 27, 2005
4th Battle, 5th round, ice field stage, Ginta vs. Girom rematch. Aqua's death has begetted a bout of wrath from Ginta, stripping him of reason and sensibility, thence his synchronization and strength drop considerably. Ginta's impending defeat warrants Babbo's forcible convincing, and eventually with Babbo v.5 Cushion Jelly conceived and realized, the Ginta vs. Giromu vendetta ends with Giromu's loss.
36	5	"Sing, Crazy Quilt, Sing! Dorothy Vs. Rapunzel!"; Transliteration: "Doroshī VS Rapuntseru, Utae. Kureijī Kiruto" (Japanese: ドロシーVSラプンツェル、唄え.クレイジーキルト)	December 4, 2005
4th Battle, 6th round, ice field stage, Dorothy vs. Rapunzel. Engaging the Knight with self-confidence envisioning opponent understatement, the witch pays dearly with several wounds, one counts vital and turns to the impertinent doll Guardian Crazy Quilt for helps, which finally ensures her victory.
37	6	"To Caldia, the Land of Witches"; Transliteration: "Mahō no Kuni, Karudea e" (Japanese: 魔法の国、カルデアへ)	December 11, 2005
With authoritative clues about "the woman whom she must kill" obtained after the fight with Rapunzel, Dorothy goes back to Kaldea with team MÄR escorting her. They learn of the truth behind one of the more shrouded characters at the top of the Chess Pieces' echelon, its Queen – Dorothy's exiled older sister Diana, Snow's stepmother empress of MÄR-Heaven's majestic kingdom Lestava thereat.
38	7	"Phantom Vs. Ginta"; Transliteration: "Shinryakusha Fantomu Ginta Gekitō no Hate ni" (Japanese: 侵略者ファントム·ギンタ激闘の果てに)	December 18, 2005
Perceiving team MÄR's on-goings, Diana unleashes her most powerful knight piece Phantom and a brigade of Rooks onto her disowned homeland. In the field of a sabotaged Kaldea, Phantom's ÄRM virtu and Ginta's clash (unofficially) for the first time, as do their ideals. The former conclude with Phantom's prowess outclassing Ginta's, whereas the latter reach a stage of stalemate from which Phantom retreats with ease, leaving Ginta brooding over the reason behind Phantom's undoings.
39	8	"Ash, the Knight Who Protects Children"; Transliteration: "Kodomo-daisuki Naito, Asshu" (Japanese: こども大好きナイト、アッシュ)	December 25, 2005
Tensions after the Kaldea's incident soon break into tranquil intervals, but are not without trouble as each pursues his/her thoughts, and Ginta in particular is approached by his scheduled 5th Battle's opponent, the child-loving Knight Ash.
40	9	"The World's Ugliest Match! Snow Vs. Emokis!"; Transliteration: "Sekaiichi Busaiku Kettei Sen!? Sunō VS Emokisu" (Japanese: 世界一ブサイク決定戦!?スノウVSエモキス)	January 8, 2006
5th Battle, 1st round, desert field stage, Snow the benign princess loses her benignancy against the contemptuous manners of Emokis, the more graceless one of three lvl. 1 Bishops. However she soon finds out to confront a first class Bishop rage is not one reliable stimulation, and the worsening situation invites the introduction of her new Guardian, Undine.
41	10	"Alviss' Crisis: Stolen Magical Power!"; Transliteration: "Ubawareta Maryoku! Aruvisu no Kiki" (Japanese: 奪われた魔力!アルヴィスの危機)	January 15, 2006
5th Battle, 2nd round, desert field stage, Alviss against the 2nd of lvl.1 Bishops, Hamelin the piper. In quite a contradiction to Snow's round, Alviss emerges from the fight victorious with others dubious as to the identity of his new Guardian.
42	11	"Sensation! The Knight Candice, Stone User!"; Transliteration: "Kaikan! Sekizukai no Naito, Kyandisu" (Japanese: 快感!石使いのナイト、キャンディス)	January 22, 2006
5th Battle, 3rd round, desert field stage, Jack's again to attest to his manhood by battling the sadomasochist seasoned female Knight Candice. The resolution and his new Guardian Mehitos, however, only makes it as far as end the battle in a tie.
43	12	"Battle Field of Death! The Psycho Space!"; Transliteration: "Shi no Senjō! Saiko Supēsu" (Japanese: 死の戦場!サイコスペース)	January 29, 2006
5th Battle, 4th round, desert field stage, Ginta vs. Ash. As the combatant selection for this duel conflicts with the Knight's moral code of excluding children from his prey list, it is Ginta to be graced by the victory parade.
44	13	"Fateful Mortal Combat! Nanashi Vs. Galian!"; Transliteration: "Unmei no Shitō! Nanashi VS Garian!" (Japanese: 運命の死闘!ナナシVSガリアン!)	February 5, 2006
5th Battle, 5th round, desert field stage, Nanashi's round with his predetermined opponent the Knight Galian turns into a fated rendez-vous with the mysterious silhouette from his past. Nanashi's old Luberia times unfold with a noteworthy blank thread of memory that stores his true identity.
45	14	"Lightning Vs. Lightning! Nanashi's Memory Returns!"; Transliteration: "Raigeki Kakeru Raigeki! Nanashi, Yomigaeru Kioku!!" (Japanese: 雷撃×雷撃!ナナシ、よみがえる記憶!!)	February 12, 2006
Galian's reason for resignation from Luberia and his confession fuel Nanashi's wrath at his betrayal and induces his summoning of the leviathan eel Guardian Gymnote, overpowering Galian.
46	15	"A Knight Reborn! Ian's Revenge!"; Transliteration: "Shinsei Naito, Fukushū no Ian!" (Japanese: 新生ナイト、復讐のイアン!)	February 19, 2006
From inside the perilous Training Gate Ian surfaces, this time with power equivalent to Knight class. Under Phantom's command, he challenges Rapunzel for her Knighthood and officially claims it after incinerating the butcher madwoman in front of Girom's eyes. Meanwhile, Edward and Babbo think that Dorothy and Snow will fight over Ginta at the next banquet.
47	16	"Alviss' Struggle"; Transliteration: "Kizudarake no Aruvisu" (Japanese: 傷だらけのアルヴィス)	February 26, 2006
Right on the first off-stage day MÄR enjoy their break, some hoodlums capture Belle for her fairy power and flee. However their getaway don't go that smoothly, for an enraged Alviss is not one to sit back watching others grab his best friend... or tolerate this deed leniently.
48	17	"Dorothy's Anger! The Desert Tower!"; Transliteration: "Ikari no Doroshī! Sabaku no Tō" (Japanese: 怒りのドロシー!砂漠の塔)	March 5, 2006
Following the instructions of an ÄRM dealer, Dorothy, Jack and Ginta accompany a young scout named Chibo on an expedition into the desert for ÄRM hunt. Unknown to the foursome, that ÄRM dealer is about as guileful as he's resourceful, and is currently plotting something sinister to treat their adventure.
49	18	"The Zonnens Infiltrate the Training Gate!"; Transliteration: "Zonnenzu! Nerawareta Shūren no Mon!!" (Japanese: ゾンネンズ!狙われた修練の門!!)	March 12, 2006
As the Knights continue bidding their time, Alan again sends his apprentice teammates into the training dimension, unaware of the Chess' outlawed Zonnen's move of protest against Phantom's War Games. Their first target is the Ginta & Jack dimension, the duo Mars-Mercury as assailants, and the fight ends with goddess of victory smiles on MÄR's side for their valiancy.
50	19	"Alviss Vs. Nanashi! Forbidden Labyrinth!"; Transliteration: "Aruvisu Kakeru Nanashi! Kindan no Rabirinsu!!" (Japanese: アルヴィス×ナナシ!禁断のラビリンス!!)	March 19, 2006
2nd target: Nanashi & Alviss dimension, Zonnen assailants: Venus & Jupiter. Nanashi and Alviss must learn to work together to beat them.
51	20	"Dorothy Vs. Snow! The Allure of Lippenstift"; Transliteration: "Doroshī Kakeru Sunou! Yūwaku no Rūju!!" (Japanese: ドロシー×スノウ!誘惑のルージュ!!)	March 26, 2006
3rd target: Dorothy & Snow dimension, Zonnen assailants: the Pluto – Uranus – Neptune. Even with all their mustered power, the three siblings can't outmatch the princess and the witch united, and are eventually clobbered.
52	21	"Concentrate! The Power of the Sixth Sense!"; Transliteration: "Todoke! Kibō no Shikkusu Sensu!!" (Japanese: 届け!希望のシックスセンス!!)	April 2, 2006
4th target: Alan (outside the Training dimensions), Zonnen assailant: the captain Saturn. Accumulating the magic power of those Gate trainees onto his own (at the moment largely diminished under the distortion of Saturn's Darkness ÄRM), Alan breaks free from his tight spot, and reverses the curses upon Saturn.
53	22	"Defeat Phantom"; Transliteration: "Fantomu o Taosu" (Japanese: ファントムを倒す)	April 9, 2006
All the members of Team MAR take on Phantom together, each reminisced of their respective reasons to fight in the war. However, before any can deal the final blow, Ginta wakes up and it turns out to be a dream.

=== Season 3 ===
No. overall	No. in season	Title	Original release date
54	1	"Alan's Goosebumps"; Transliteration: "Aran no Sabuibo" (Japanese: アランのサブイボ)	April 16, 2006
In the first battle of the 6th Round, Alan faces off against the cat-girl Chaton, the strongest Bishop. Unfortunately for Alan, he inherited Edward's fear of cats when he was still in him. Due to this Alan comically loses to the feline Bishop.
55	2	"The Unforgiving Alviss"; Transliteration: "Aruvisu ga Yurusenai" (Japanese: アルヴィスが許せない)	April 23, 2006
Alviss faces off against Kouga, the weakest Knight, who is jealous at Alviss for looking handsome. Kouga stands little chance against Alviss, and Alviss wins through an incredible show of strength through the use of his new Guardian.
56	3	"Dorothy is Eaten"; Transliteration: "Doroshī ga Taberareta" (Japanese: ドロシーが食べられた)	April 30, 2006
Dorothy faces off against Pinocchio, the puppet Knight created by Diana. When Dorothy is eaten by Pinocchio's Guardian ÄRM Fastitocalon, she encounters its soul inhabitant Poko who used to be Diana's servant before he accidentally stepped on her dress and ended up condemned to Fastitocalon. Dorothy promises to defeat Fastitocalon and save Poko, a promise she fulfills, and Dorothy defeats Pinocchio.
57	4	"Snow's Smile"; Transliteration: "Sunō ga Waratta" (Japanese: スノウが笑った)	May 7, 2006
An old babysitter of Snow, the Knight Magical Roe, faces off against her. However, he is also on a mission by Diana to capture Snow and succeeds.
58	5	"Ian's Anger"; Transliteration: "Ian ga Okoru" (Japanese: イアンが怒る)	May 14, 2006
Ginta has a rematch with Ian, who has risen to the rank of Knight since their last encounter. Ginta, however, is blinded by his anger of Snow's capture, and Ian is much stronger than he used to be. It is through Ginta's will to save Snow, however, that he defeats Ian and makes him realize revenge won't save Gido.
59	6	"Ginta Returns to Tokyo"; Transliteration: "Ginta Tōkyō e" (Japanese: ギンタ東京へ)	May 21, 2006
After Ian's defeat, Pozan announces that the final round of the War Games will be held weeks later in Reginlief. Gaira's Training Gate sends Team MÄR to Tokyo. After Ginta saves Koyuki from students of a rival school, Ginta encounters Jack as that gang's leader with no memories of Ginta. When Ginta aims at the ÄRM on Jack's forehead, Jack returns to normal. For some reason, Nanashi appears on a motorcycle and kidnaps Koyuki.
60	7	"Out of Control Nanashi"; Transliteration: "Nanashi no Bōsō" (Japanese: ナナシの暴走)	May 28, 2006
When Nanashi is discovered to be a bike gang leader after being found weak without memory, Ginta and Jack end up helping Nanashi when a rival gang kidnaps the teammates of the gang that found Nanashi. With the gang defeated and Nanashi back to normal, finding the others is the next goal.
61	8	"Dorothy's Inner Mind"; Transliteration: "Shinsō no Doroshī" (Japanese: 深窓のドロシー)	June 4, 2006
Ginta, Babbo, Jack, and Nanashi find Dorothy as a maid to a rich mistress. Now they must find a way to get Dorothy to remember herself.
62	9	"Alan the Detective"; Transliteration: "Aran no Meitantei" (Japanese: アランの名探偵)	June 11, 2006
Alan is the next one to be rescued from the strange spell over Team MÄR. Alan has since taken the job of a detective, and Alan uses his powerful ÄRM to defeat criminals. Ginta and Dorothy create a case for him to solve, and free him, too, from the hypnosis. Meanwhile, Koyuki goes missing from Team MÄR's hiding place. Can Dorothy and Ginta free Alan and defeat a monster sent by a mysterious woman.
63	10	"Alviss and the Girl"; Transliteration: "Aruvisu to Shōjo" (Japanese: アルヴィスと少女)	June 18, 2006
Alviss is shown to be taking care of a girl named Kotomi in a hospital. He, too, has no more memories of MÄR-Heaven.
64	11	"Koyuki's Mask"; Transliteration: "Koyuki no Kamen" (Japanese: 小雪の仮面)	June 25, 2006
With all of Team MÄR reunited, Alan has come to a conclusion that they are not really in Tokyo, but in someplace that resembles Tokyo. Ginta ends up investigating while the others flee the police. Ginta ends up encountering what looks like, but isn't Kannochi and ends up fighting him
65	12	"Lilith in Wonderland"; Transliteration: "Fushigi no Kuni no Ririsu" (Japanese: 不思議の国のリリス)	July 2, 2006
Alan's theory of Tokyo came true when Lilith has made herself known. Alan reveals that he, Gaira, and the Cross Guard met Lilith during the battle against the Chess Pieces and that her parents were the Legendary ÄRM Users that kept her village safe. When she was in the Cross Guard and training with Alan in the Training Gate, she used a Dimension ÄRM to leave. While Jack, Nanashi, and Alviss fight the ÄRM Plenu Ryunu and stone knights, Ginta, Alan, and Dorothy head into the gate to confront Lilith and find out why she is doing the things experienced.
66	13	"The Secret of Princess Reginleif"; Transliteration: "Reginreivu-hime no Himitsu" (Japanese: レギンレイヴ姫の秘密)	July 9, 2006
Alibaba resurfaces and captures Princess Reginleif.
67	14	"Loco and the New Cursed ÄRM"; Transliteration: "Roko to Noroi no Shin ARM" (Japanese: ロコと呪いの新ARM)	July 16, 2006
With the aid of Loco, Ginta and Jack pursue Alibaba to where he has Princess Reginleif.
68	15	"The Last Battle Begins"; Transliteration: "Rasuto Batoru Hajimaru" (Japanese: ラストバトル始まるッ)	July 23, 2006
The final round of the War Games begin. Jack battles against Weasel, the Chess Piece responsible for the death of Jack's father, Jake. Jack and Weasel are initially even, though when Weasel summons his Guardian, things begin to fall in his favor.
69	16	"Jack and the Flame Guardian"; Transliteration: "Jakku to Honō no Gādian" (Japanese: ジャックと炎のガーディアン)	July 30, 2006
When Weasel summons Yggdrasil, Jack tries to draw strength from his wish to avenge his father's defeat and surpass his father to defeat Vizel. Soon after Jack regains his advantage, Weasel summons a powerful Guardian, Bird of Rotten Wood that destroyies trees, easily defeating almost all of Jack's abilities. Jack, in a final attack, summons his second Guardian and defeats both Yggdrasil and Bird of Rotten Wood, besting Weasel and surpassing his father.
70	17	"Rematch: Alviss VS Rolan"; Transliteration: "Saisen: Aruvisu Tai Roran" (Japanese: 再戦 アルヴィス対ロラン)	August 6, 2006
Alviss and Rolan face each other in a rematch. Alviss questions Rolan for his decision of following Phantom, while Rolan questions why Alviss is so determined to live to eventually die rather than live forever with the ones he loves.
71	18	"An Eternal Moment"; Transliteration: "Eien no Setsuna" (Japanese: 永遠の刹那)	August 13, 2006
Alviss and Rolan continue their bout, with Rolan's instability over Phantom becoming his weakness, leading Alviss to victory. With Rolan defeated, Dorothy faces off against Chimera.
72	19	"The Sorrowful Chimera"; Transliteration: "Kanashimi no Kimera" (Japanese: 悲しみの花嫁(キメラ))	August 20, 2006
Although at first, Dorothy stands little chance against Chimera, Dorothy manages to break off Chimera's skull mask, revealing Chimera's true identity, a woman. With Chimera's true face revealed, Dorothy learns the history behind the Chess Piece member.
73	20	"Alan's Trauma"; Transliteration: "Aran no Torauma" (Japanese: の古傷(トラウマ))	August 27, 2006
Alan finally has his battle with Halloween. Some history is revealed between the two since childhood. Halloween also begins a killing spree with the spectators, severely wounding Alan when he tries to defend them.
74	21	"Farewell, Halloween"; Transliteration: "Saraba Harowin" (Japanese: さらば旧友(ハロウィン))	September 3, 2006
As Alan's battle with Halloween rages on, Halloween unleashes his Grave Hail ÄRM on him. Once Alan defeats this and survives another of Halloween's waves of flame attacks, Halloween summons his Guardian, Wakan Tanka. Alan summons his own Guardian, which is capable of defeating Wanka Tanka and throwing Halloween to unknown whereabouts, making Alan the victor.
75	22	"Luberia's Oath"; Transliteration: "Ruberia no Chikai" (Japanese: ルベリアの誓い)	September 10, 2006
Nanashi takes on Peta in his match. Peta's use of his blood-draining ÄRM combined with his intelligence is much more than a match for Nanashi.
76	23	"Garnet Claw"; Transliteration: "Gānetto Kurō" (Japanese: 真紅の爪(ガーネットクロウ))	September 17, 2006
When Peta starts to have the advantage, Nanashi is brought to the brink of death. Nanashi is only saved with a Holy ÄRM given to him by Alviss, leaving the two fighters with only their Guardians left. Nanashi manages to both defeat Peta's Guardian and destroy his Blood Body, effectively defeating Peta. With the last of his strength, Nanashi delivers the death blow and avenges Luberia.
77	24	"Ginta vs. Phantom"; Transliteration: "Ginta Tai Fantomu" (Japanese: ギンタ対ファントム)	September 24, 2006
Ginta and Phantom finally begin their match. Just before this, however, Dorothy hands over to Ginta a new magic stone for Babbo. Ginta easily defeats Phantom's weakest Guardians, though once Phantom uses his Phantom Glass, Ginta is forced to listen to Phantom's shocking background.
78	25	"The Ultimate Cat Guardian"; Transliteration: "Saikyō Neko Gādian" (Japanese: 最凶猫ガーディアン)	October 1, 2006
Phantom reveals that he was a Caldian, and as a child was entranced by the Orb. One day he was caught, however, and his parents, unable to punish him, commit suicide. Phantom goes on to explain how he met Diana in jail and that he stole the ÄRM and the Orb with her. Unable to listen any longer, Ginta reveals Babbo's sixth form, which transforms into a Puss in Boots like the fairytale, and defeats several of Phantom's remaining Guardians.
79	26	"Conclusion"; Transliteration: "Ketchaku" (Japanese: 決着ッ)	October 8, 2006
Ginta and Phantom finish their battle by using their strongest Guardians. Phantom's two Guardians when put together, however, are much to strong for Ginta's Gargoyle, and the three end up destroying each other. With no further ÄRM left, Phantom tries to best Ginta physically, though Ginta's iron will manages to defeat Phantom once and for all.
80	27	"The Cute Visitor"; Transliteration: "Kawaii Raikyaku" (Japanese: かわいい来客)	October 15, 2006
Ginta finishes the fight with Phantom, and team MÄR searches for Pozun, needing his Andata to get to Lestava and rescue Snow. Jack, Chaton, Alan, Nanashi find Pozun's younger sister, Porin. Porin takes them to her village, and explains why Pozun was referee for the Chess Pieces.

=== Season 4 ===
No. overall	No. in season	Title	Original release date
81	1	"The Splitting Babbo"; Transliteration: "Babbo Wareru" (Japanese: バッボ割れる)	October 22, 2006
Babbo is cracking and needs to be taken to Caldia to get repaired. Belle, Alviss, Dorothy, and Ginta decide to take Andarta to get there. Pinocchion shows up and attacks Dorothy, destroying her Andarta. Kouga shows up to fight Alviss, and Giromu attacks Ginta, almost killing him. Team MÄR defeats their enemy and continue on their way to Caldia on Ed's Magic Carpet.
82	2	"Roar of Revival"; Transliteration: "Fukkatsu no Hōkō" (Japanese: 復活の咆哮)	October 29, 2006
Girom, Kouga, and Pinnochion attack Caldia in plans to capture the Caldia Grand Elder. Dorothy and Ginta, however, show up and defeat the three.
83	3	"Ian and the Bride"; Transliteration: "Ian to Hanayome" (Japanese: イアンと花嫁)	November 5, 2006
Ian pursues Chimera in hopes to defeat her and reverse Gido's transformation. Chimera is more than a match for Ian at first, though Ian gains the upper hand by cleverly using his Moon Fall. Finally showing humanity, Chimera, before dying, breaks the curse on Gido, and wishes for the two to have a happy life together. Chimera is last seen with her eyes back to her own normal, compassionate eyes.
84	4	"Saving Snow"; Transliteration: "Sunō Dakkan" (Japanese: スノウ奪還)	November 12, 2006
With the help of Pozun's Andarta, Ginta and the rest of Team MÄR storm Lestava castle to rescue Snow. To get to Snow, they must first have to go through a barrier of Chess Pieces and among them, the one responsible for Snow's kidnapping, the Knight Magical Roe. Magical Roe, once defeated by Ginta and Alan, realizes his wrongdoings and chooses to die to save the princess, much to the two's shock.
85	5	"The Storm of Love, Zephyrus Broom"; Transliteration: "Ai no Arashi Zepyurosu Burūmu" (Japanese: 愛の嵐ゼピュロスブルーム)	November 19, 2006
On their way to banish Phantom from existence once and for all, Dorothy and Alviss are waylaid by their target's remaining most devoted minions, Candice and Rolan.
86	6	"The Rondo of Time"; Transliteration: "Jikan no Rondo" (Japanese: 時間の輪舞(ロンド))	November 26, 2006
Phantom reveals his final efforts to defeat Team MÄR, the Ghost Chess, a powerful group of Ghost ÄRM users most loyal to Phantom. Their leader, Kapel Meister uses a Ghost ÄRM to speed up the process of Alviss' Zombie Tattoo.
87	7	"Fortress City Pultgayin"; Transliteration: "Jōsai Toshi Parutogain" (Japanese: 城塞都市バルトガイン)	December 3, 2006
MÄR manage to meet up with each other, and Nanashi finds a map. On the map is the island of Pultgayin. The party deduces that this is the lair of the Ghost Chess. Nanashi uses some strange thief skills to get the team onto the island, but his raft is destroyed on the way there, and Allan has to throw the team using his guardian. Meanwhile Kapellmeister steals Alviss away from Belle and Snow. With that success, the Ghost Chess are called to retreat, but before they leave, the Flat Sisters merge with a Ghost Guardian and attack the team.
88	8	"Phantom's Dream"; Transliteration: "Fantomu no Yume" (Japanese: ファントムの夢)	December 10, 2006
MÄR learns that Poko has found an underground entrance to the island, and they take his whale to enter undetected. Meanwhile Alviss is on his way to see Phantom. Rolan doesn't trust Alviss' change in heart and tried to prevent him from meeting Phantom. Once Alviss meets Phantom, Alviss begins to feel drawn towards the dark side. He quickly attacks Phantom and tries to insert the key into Phantom's chest, but Phantom is too powerful and easily stops him. The episode ends with Alviss on a chain leash that Phantom is holding.
89	9	"Awakening the Zombie Tattoo"; Transliteration: "Kakusei no Zonbi Tatū" (Japanese: 覚醒のゾンビタトゥ)	December 17, 2006
With Alviss's Zombie Tattoo causing him to fall under Phantom's control, the others end up fighting Alviss.
90	10	"Oblivious Clavier"; Transliteration: "Bōkyaku no Kuravīa" (Japanese: 忘却のクラヴィーア)	December 24, 2006
Ginta, Dorothy and Belle approach the coliseum. They are met inside by the Misty Knights and Misty Hadju. When they refuse to leave, the Misty Knights vow to kill them. Meanwhile Loco swaps bodies with General so Chaton can be dragged into the prison to be with Alan. Alan and Nanashi have become test rats for a Ghost ÄRM experiment meant to remove the need for human emotions from Phantom. Just before the Misty Knights attack Ginta and Dorothy again, the ghost ship from Vestry arrives and advises the Knights that they have been fooled by the Ghost Chess. Ginta and Dorothy learn that Alviss himself will have to arrive before the path to Clavier will open.
91	11	"Sleep, Alviss"; Transliteration: "Aruvisu yo Nemure" (Japanese: アルヴィスよ瞑(ねむ)れ)	January 7, 2007
Team MÄR ends up captured by the Ghost Chess alongside Loco and Chaton.
92	12	"Misty Castle"; Transliteration: "Misuti Kyassuru" (Japanese: ミスティ キャッスル)	January 14, 2007
Team MÄR head to the coliseum with Alviss. They are met there by the Ghost Chess, they fight to let Alviss through to the Clavier. Loco sacrifices the last of her magical power to save Chaton, and ends up as a baby. Alviss makes it to Clavier, where he meets up with a small boy, wanting to save MÄR Heaven. Alviss lets the boy take the ÄRM. (We get hints that the boy is actually a younger Alviss.)
93	13	"Analysis of Hades"; Transliteration: "Meikai no Anarīze" (Japanese: 冥界のアナリーゼ)	January 21, 2007
Team MÄR hold back Kapellmeister and the Ghost Chess from following Alviss into Clavier. During the battle, Sara's use of her Ghost ÄRM ends up destroying her. Seeing that his Ghost Chess members cannot defeat MÄR, Kapell absorbs them into his body in order to activate his ultimate Ghost ÄRM. MÄR quickly defeats him.
94	14	"The Scattered and Dyed Rose"; Transliteration: "Bara wa Chirite nao Somari" (Japanese: 薔薇は散りてなお染まり)	January 28, 2007
Alviss, Ginta and Dorothy head back to the castle to kill Phantom. They were stopped by Rolan, who said only Alviss could go forward with him. When both of them reached the throne room, Phantom, along with Candice, had disappeared. Enraged, Rolan tried to kill Alviss, but stopped when he heard the teen cry out in pain. Using a sharpened vine, Rolan stabbed himself to death, wishing that he and Phantom could meet again in a more peaceful reborn life. Alviss, Ginta and Dorothy heads off after Phantom. Candice tried to stop them from killing Phantom, but failed. When Alviss was about to kill Phantom, he hesitated, and Phantom plunged the Prifickave into his own body, thus ending his own immortal life, much to Alviss's shock. Alviss is freed from the Zombie Tattoo.
95	15	"The Truth About Snow"; Transliteration: "Sunō no Shinjitsu" (Japanese: スノウの真実)	February 4, 2007
The truth of Snow is finally revealed, that she is connected to Koyuki of Earth through the evilness of Diana, who planted a Magical Stone in Snow's mother to make it all happen. Using their connection, Diana plans to open a portal between both worlds.
96	16	"False Peace"; Transliteration: "Itsuwari no Heiwa" (Japanese: 偽りの平和)	February 11, 2007
The Chess Pieces' King finally reveals himself in a final attempt to bring the world under his control. To begin his plot, King kills Alan with ease. Before dying, Alan gives his final words to Team MÄR and gives Chaton his earring.
97	17	"The Flame Disperses, and the Water Sleeps"; Transliteration: "Honō ni Chiri, Sui ni Nemuru" (Japanese: 炎に散り 水に眠る)	February 18, 2007
Ginta and Dorothy head to Caldia and end up freeing Caldia's Grand Elder after Diana's attack. Meanwhile, Alviss, Jack, Snow, and Nanashi re-encounter Pano who was stealing food. When Garon and Leno end up with the same fate as Alan, they are attacked by King. Nanashi and Snow end up becoming his next victims.
98	18	"Farewell, Tender-Hearted Chess"; Transliteration: "Saraba Kokoro Yasashiki Chesu" (Japanese: さらば 心優しきチェス)	February 25, 2007
After Nanashi and Snow's death, Ginta, Alviss, Dorothy, Ian, and Ash discover King's plan to take over Earth. When King attacks, Ash becomes his next victim. He leaves behind a mysterious ÄRM.
99	19	"Alviss' Light"; Transliteration: "Aruvisu no Hikari" (Japanese: アルヴィスの光)	March 4, 2007
Alviss faces off against King and discovers that his identity is Danna Toramizu, Ginta's father and the one who helped save MÄR-Heaven six years ago. When Alviss was about to die in King's hands, he saw Rolan and Phantom, who encouraged him to stand up and fight, and so did Bell (although she did not know they were there). Alviss sacrificed himself by holding King down so that his ÄRM a Baoa Qu could activate and blow King (along with him) up. King escapes, but Alviss is severely wounded. Before dying, Alviss uses the last of his magical power to activate the ÄRM that Ash left behind. When Dorothy, Ginta, and Babbo leave to go to the stolen Caldian castle, Alviss thanks Bell and dies.
100	20	"The Tempest of Woe, Zephyrus Broom"; Transliteration: "Ai no Arashi Zepyurosu Burūmu" (Japanese: 哀の嵐ゼピュロスブルーム)	March 11, 2007
After Alviss' death, Ginta, Babbo, and Dorothy head toward the stolen Caldian Floating Castle where King is hiding. Once there, Dorothy faces off against Diana. Once Diana is defeated and killed, King Danna-Orb arrives and kills her.
101	21	"Ginta vs. Danna"; Transliteration: "Ginta Tai Danna" (Japanese: ギンタ対ダンナ)	March 18, 2007
After Dorothy's death after the death of Diana, Ginta faces off against the Chess Piece King Danna-Orb. During battle, Ginta discovers that his father's soul was within Babbo all along while Caldia's Orb was in Danna's body. After Caldia's Orb is removed from Danna, Caldia's Orb takes on its true form and invades Earth.
102	22	"The Excitement Never Stops"; Transliteration: "Wakuwaku wa Tomaranai" (Japanese: ワクワクは止まらない)	March 25, 2007
With Caldia's Orb on Earth, Ginta takes Babbo's Gargoyle to Earth for the final battle. The two end up in Tokyo, where their battle eradicates the city and destroys a large part of the population. Snow's spirit, however, combines with Koyuki's to form one being, and by doing so removing the magical stone from Snow. Ginta uses the stone to create a more powerful Gargoyle that uses the hopes of MÄR-Heaven to defeat the Orb once and for all. With the Orb destroyed, peace brought to MÄR-Heaven, everyone who was killed by King revived, and Danna restored, Ginta returns to his own world with his father. At the very end, Ginta and Koyuki, who has fused into one being with Snow, walk home together at sunset. She clings to his arm and they both blush.
