= Yoshinobu Ohga =

Japanese arranger & guitarist (born 1971)

Yoshinobu Ōga 大賀 好修
- Born: April 8, 1971 (age 55); Hyōgo, Japan
- Genres: Japanese pop, rock
- Occupations: arranger, guitarist
- Years active: 1995–present
- Label: Giza Studio
- Website: http://garnetcrow.com/

Yoshinobu Ōga (大賀 好修, Ōga Yoshinobu) is a Japanese musical arranger and guitarist in distributors Being Inc., mainly in their label Giza Studio. In years 2000-2002 he was part of the Japanese soul band Nothin' but love, in years 2004-2009 part of Japanese pop band OOM and since 2012 he's member of fusion band Sensation as a guitarist.

== List of provided works as arranger ==
★ album ☆ single/coupling

=== Miho Komatsu ===
- Kanashii Koi☆
- Kimi no Me ni wa Utsuranai ☆
- Love Gone ☆
- Miho Komatsu 4 : A Thousand Feelings ★
- Saigo no Toride ☆
- Aishiteru ☆
- Todomaru Koto no nai Ai ☆
- Dance ☆
- Gift, Comunne with you, Agaki, Demo Wasurenai, Ai no Uta (Miho Komatsu 5 : Source)★
- Sakura ga Mau Koro ☆
- Kimi Sae Ireba (Miho Komatsu 6 : Hanano) ★
- Hito wa Oomukashi, Umi ni Sundeta kara, Diplomacy, Kimi no Naseru Waza (Miho Komatsu 7 : Prime Number)★
- Sugu Koi Nante Dekiru ☆
- Koi ni Nare... ☆
- My darling, Fukigen ni Naru Watashi (Miho Komatsu 8 : A Piece of Cake) ★

=== Zard ===
- Mado no Soto wa Monochrome, hero, Sekai wa Kitto Mirai no Naka -another style 21- (Toki no Tsubasa) ★
- Itoshii Hito yo -Na mo naki Tabibito yo- ☆

=== Aiuchi Rina ===
- Spark (Power of Words) ★
- Silver hide and seek ☆
- PARTY TIME PARTY UP (Trip) ★

=== Azumi Uehara ===
- Song for you-Will- (Ikitakuwanai Bokutachi) ★

=== Hayami Kishimoto ===
- Jumping! Go Let's Go! ☆

=== Akane Sugazaki ===
- Beginning dream ☆
- Fly high ☆
- Boyfriend ☆
- Kimi ni Aitakute, Ribbon in the sky, Truth (beginning) ★

=== Shiori Takei ===
- Circle (Diary) ★
- Cherish you (Shiori Takei Best) ★

=== Aiko Kitahara ===
- Sun rise train ☆
- Amore -Koiseyo! Otometachi yo!- ☆
- Paradise (Aiko Kitahara Best) ★

=== the★tambourines ===
- Wonder boy ☆
- Atsui Namida ☆
- Dive to the sky ☆

=== Mai Kuraki ===
- Love Sick, Kakenukeru Inazuma, Don't Leave Me Alone, You look at me~one (Fuse of Love) ★
- Cuz you'll know that you're right ☆
- Cherish the Day (Diamond Wave)★

=== Yumi Shizukusa ===
- Any more (Control Your Touch) ★

=== Ai Takaoka ===
- Leaving ☆
- I need you for my life ☆
- Ice candy, Ai wa Gokigen (Acoustic Love) ★
- Never to Return (Fiction) ★

=== U-ka Saegusa in dB ===
- Because I love you good-bye street (U-ka saegusa IN db 1st ~Kimi to Yakusoku Shita Yasashii Ano Basho made~)★

=== B'z ===
- Las Vegas, No excuse, Amarinimo, Epic Day, Black Coffee, Man Of the March (Epic Day) ★

=== Wag ===
- All For Your Love ☆

== List of provided works as composer ==
=== Mai Kuraki ===
- Kakenukeru Inazuma, Don't Leave Me Alone, You look at me~one (Fuse of Love) ★

=== Aiko Kitahara ===
- Te Quiero Te Amo ~Natsu no Natsu no Koi~ ☆

=== Yumi Shizukusa ===
- Move On ☆

== Interview ==
- Entertainmentstation 1.3.2016
