= Nazo =

Nazo may refer to:

- Nazo (album), a 1997 album of Japanese singer Miho Komatsu
  - "Nazo" (song)
- Nazo (actor), Afghan actor in Pekhawaray Mardanay
- Dr. Nazo, fictional Japanese supervillain
