= Hitsuji no Ki =

Japanese manga series

- First volume cover

羊の木
- Genre: Suspense
- Manga
- Written by: Tatsuhiko Yamagami
- Illustrated by: Mikio Igarashi
- Published by: Kodansha
- Magazine: Evening
- Original run: June 14, 2011 – April 8, 2014
- Volumes: 5
- Live-action film

The Scythian Lamb
- Directed by: Daihachi Yoshida
- Produced by: Yoko Ide
- Written by: Masahito Kagawa
- Studio: Asmik Ace
- Released: February 3, 2018
- icon

Hitsuji no Ki (Japanese: 羊の木; lit. 'Sheep Tree') is a Japanese manga series written by Tatsuhiko Yamagami and illustrated by Mikio Igarashi. Published by Kodansha, it was serialized in the seinen manga magazine Evening from June 2011 to April 2014, with its chapters compiled into five tankōbon volumes. A live-action film adaptation directed by Daihachi Yoshida was released in Japan in February 2018.

== Media ==
=== Manga ===
Hitsuji no Ki is written by Tatsuhiko Yamagami and illustrated by Mikio Igarashi. It was serialized in Kodansha's Evening from June 14, 2011, to April 8, 2014. Kodansha collected its chapters in five tankōbon volumes, released from November 22, 2011, to May 23, 2014.

==== Volumes ====
No.	Japanese release date	Japanese ISBN
1	November 22, 2011	978-4-06-352383-6
2	June 22, 2012	978-4-06-352420-8
3	January 23, 2013	978-4-06-352445-1
4	October 23, 2013	978-4-06-352479-6
5	May 23, 2014	978-4-06-354515-9

=== Live-action film ===
A live-action film adaptation of the manga titled The Scythian Lamb was released on February 3, 2018. The film is directed by Daihachi Yoshida and had its premiere at the 2017 Busan Film Festival.

== Reception ==
The manga was one of the Jury Selections in the Manga Division of the 16th Japan Media Arts Festival Awards in 2012. It was nominated for the 17th Annual Tezuka Osamu Cultural Prize in 2013. It was also nominated for the 18th Annual Tezuka Osamu Cultural Prize in 2014, and also for the Reader Award at the same awards. It won an Excellence Award in the Manga Division of the 18th Japan Media Arts Festival Awards in 2014.
