= Kamurobamura-e =

Manga by Mikio Igarashi

- First volume cover

かむろば村へ
- Genre: Comedy, slice of life
- Manga
- Written by: Mikio Igarashi
- Published by: Shogakukan
- Magazine: Big Comic
- Original run: 2007 – 2008
- Volumes: 4
- Live-action film

A Farewell to Jinu
- Directed by: Suzuki Matsuo
- Written by: Suzuki Matsuo
- Released: April 4, 2015

Kamurobamura-e (かむろば村へ; "To Kamuroba Village") is a Japanese slice of life comedy seinen manga series written and illustrated by Mikio Igarashi. It was published by Shogakukan, with four volumes released. A live action film adaptation titled A Farewell to Jinu (ジヌよさらば ～かむろば村へ～, Jinuyo Saraba: Kamuroba Mura e), directed by Suzuki Matsuo, was released on April 4, 2015.

== Plot ==
Based on a manga series, the film stars Matsuda Ryuhei and concerns a man who develops a deep fear of money, who moves to a small and remote village to deal with his phobia. The story takes place in Tōhoku region.

Former bank clerk Takeharu thought he was strange when he moved to a remote village in Japan's northeastern Tohoku region after developing an inexplicable "money allergy." However, as he attempts to live a peaceful rural life without currency, Kamuroba village's bizarre characters draw him out of his shell in this increasingly surreal madcap comedy.

However, when a nearby town leader attempts to overthrow the handyman bus driver mayor, Takeharu must prove his attachment to Kamuroba and its people.

== Cast ==
- Ryuhei Matsuda as Takeharu Takami
- Takako Matsu
- Sadao Abe
- Fumi Nikaidō
- Toshiyuki Nishida

== Volumes ==
- 1 (December 10, 2007)
- 2 (April 10, 2008)
- 3 (October 10, 2008)
- 4 (December 26, 2008)

== Reception ==
The film earned ¥52.057 million on its opening weekend in Japan.
