= Miho Komatsu 2nd: Mirai =

Studio album by Miho Komatsu
- Released: 19 December 1998
- Recorded: 1998
- Genre: Japanese pop
- Length: 47:34
- Label: Amemura O-town Record
- Producer: ROCKAKU

Miho Komatsu chronology
Nazo (1997)	Miho Komatsu 2nd: Mirai (1998)	Miho Komatsu 3rd: Everywhere (2000)

Singles from Miho Komatsu 2nd: Mirai
- 1. "Negai Goto Hitotsu Dake" Released: 14 January 1998; 2. "anybody's game" Released: 18 March 1998; 3. "Chance" Released: 19 August 1998; 4. "Kōri no ue ni Tatsu yō ni" Released: 14 October 1998

Miho Komatsu 2nd: Mirai (小松未歩 2nd 〜未来〜) is the second studio album by the Japanese singer-songwriter Miho Komatsu. It was released on 19 December 1998 by Amemura O-town Record.

== Background ==
The album includes four previously released singles: "Negai Goto Hitotsu Dake", "Chance", "anybody's game" and "Kōri no ue ni Tatsu yō ni" as well as the B-side of the fourth single, "Ichiman Meter no Keshiki".

The single "Kōri no ue ni Tatsu yō ni" received new album instrumentation with no subtitle. Compared to the single, the introduction begins with acoustic guitar. This version of song is the closest to that in the anime television series Detective Conan.

This album includes one self cover song, "Tegotae no Nai Ai", which was originally performed by the Japanese rock band Deen from Being Inc. Later, it was included in two compilation albums by Deen, Deen The Best of Kiseki and DEEN The Best FOREVER Complete Singles+.

This is her only album released on the Amemura label. Her next album, Everywhere, was released by Giza Studio to which she moved in 1999.

== Charts ==
It reached #3 in its first week with 202,290 copies sold. The album charted for 12 weeks and sold 600,900 copies making it her highest selling album.

== Track listing ==
All songs written and composed by Miho Komatsu and arranged by Hirohito Furui (Garnet Crow)

No.	Title	Length
1.	"Mirai" (未来)	4:59
2.	"anybody's game"	4:09
3.	"Chance" (チャンス)	4:16
4.	"Kōri no ue ni Tatsu yō ni" (氷の上に立つように)	3:58
5.	"Tegotae no nai Ai" (手ごたえのない愛, song was originally performed by Deen)	5:04
6.	"Anata no Rhythm" (あなたのリズム)	4:18
7.	"Ichiman Meter no Keshiki" (1万メートルの景色)	4:03
8.	"Namida" (涙)	4:22
9.	"Shizukesa no Ato" (静けさの後)	3:21
10.	"Negai Goto Hitotsu Dake" (願い事ひとつだけ)	4:43
11.	"Deep Emotion"	4:26

== Personnel ==
Credits adapted from the CD booklet of Miho Komatsu 2nd: Mirai.

- Miho Komatsu – vocals, songwriting, composing, producer
- Hirohito Furui - arranger
- Secil Minami - chorus
- Toshiki Haruna - chorus
- Takumi Ito - chorus
- Yoshinobu Ohga - guitar
- Makoto Miyoshi - guitar
- Kaori - violin
- Taku Oyabu - voice recording
- Masayuki Nomura: track engineer
- Yoshinori Akai: track engineer, recording engineer
- Shuji Yamada: assistant engineer
- Gan Kojima – design
- Tatsushi Nagae - design
- Ryosuke Kimura - design
- Be Planning - art direction
- Miho Mori - photography
- Yukiko Yamawaki - promotion writer
- Chiaki Matsuda - label management
- Rockaku - producing

== Use in media ==
- "anybody's game"
  - Fuji TV program SF as ending theme
  - NHK drama series Ojisan Kaizou Kouza as theme song
  - KBS music program J-rock Artists Best 50 as opening theme
- "Ichiman Meter no Keshiki"
  - Yomiuri TV program Japan International Birdman Rallyas theme song
  - Shizuoka Asahi Television informational program Sport Paradise as ending theme
  - CM song for Iwaki Meisei University's radio
- "Chance"
  - Fuji TV's morning breakfast program Mezamashi TV as theme song
- "Koori no Ue ni Tatsu you ni"
  - Anime television series Detective Conan as sixth ending theme
- "Mirai"
  - Kyushu Electric Power as radio CM song
- "Tegotae no nai Ai"
  - PlayStation game L no Kisetsu ~a piece of memories~ as opening theme
- "Negai Goto Hitotsu Dake"
  - Anime television series Detective Conan as fif5th ending theme
