= Mikio Igarashi =

Japanese manga artist

- いがらしみきお
- Born: January 13, 1955 (age 70); Kami, Miyagi, Japan
- Occupation: Manga artist
- Known for: Bonobono; Ninpen Manmaru

Mikio Igarashi (いがらしみきお or 五十嵐 三喜夫, Igarashi Mikio) is a Japanese manga artist born 13 January 1955 in the town of Nakaniida (now Kami), Kami District, Miyagi Prefecture, Japan, though he lives in the city of Sendai. He is best known for his manga series Bonobono and Ninpen Manmaru. In 1988, he won the Kodansha Manga Award for general manga for Bonobono and the Shogakukan Manga Award for children's manga for Ninpen Manmaru.

== Profile ==
After leaving Miyagi Prefectural Furukawa Kōgyō High School (宮城県古川工業高等学校, Miyagi-ken Furukawa Kōgyō Kōtō Gakkō) before graduating, Igarashi worked for an advertising company in their print shop. While working there, he made his professional debut as a manga artist in 1972.

== Works ==
- Bonobono
- Ninpen Manmaru
- Kamurobamura-e
- Hitsuji no Ki (2011-2014)
