= Miho Komatsu 5: Source =

Studio album by Miho Komatsu
- Released: 25 September 2002
- Recorded: 2001–2002
- Genre: Japanese pop
- Length: 49:41
- Label: Giza Studio
- Producer: Miho Komatsu (Executive Producer: KANONJI ROCKAKU)

Miho Komatsu chronology
Miho Komatsu 4: A Thousand Feelings (2001)	Miho Komatsu 5: Source (2002)	Miho Komatsu 6th: Hanano (2003)

Singles from Miho Komatsu 5: Source
- 1. "Todomaru Koto no nai Ai" Released: 30 May 2001; 2. "Saigo no Toride" Released: 8 August 2001; 3. "Aishiteru" Released: 5 December 2001; 4. "dance" Released: 29 May 2002

Miho Komatsu 5: Source (小松未歩 5 〜source〜) is the fifth studio album of Japanese singer songwriter Miho Komatsu. It was released on 25 September 2002 through Giza Studio label.

== Background ==
Album includes previous 4 released singles, Todomaru koto no nai Ai, Saigo no Toride, Aishiteru and dance.

Re-arranged version of Style of my own appeared later in her 17th single Mysterious Love as b-side track.

Some b-side tracks previously released singles Aishiteru and Saigo no Toride were included in this album, such as Agaki and Ai no Uta.

The song commune with you appeared in her conceptual album Lyrics in 2003.

The single Todomaru Koto no nai Ai was included in the compilation album Giza Studio Masterpiece Blend 2001, however another songs such as Gift and dance were included in the compilation album Giza Studio Masterpiece Blend 2002.

== Charting ==
The album reached #23 rank first week with 20,460 sold copies. Album charted for 3 weeks and totally sold 28,720 copies. This is the first album which didn't enter to top 10 in Oricon rankings.

== Track listing ==
All tracks are arranged by Yoshinobu Ohga (Nothin' but love) except of tracks #6 (by Daisuke Ikeda) and #7 (by Hirohito Furui (Garnet Crow).

All lyrics are written by Miho Komatsu; all music is composed by Miho Komatsu

No.	Title	Length
1.	"gift"	3:23
2.	"Aishiteru" (愛してる...)	4:33
3.	"Todomaru Koto no nai Ai" (とどまることのない愛)	5:08
4.	"commune with you"	5:33
5.	"Agaki" (足掻き)	4:59
6.	"Yakusoku no Umi" (約束の海)	4:52
7.	"style of my own"	3:26
8.	"Saigo no Toride" (さいごの砦)	4:50
9.	"dance"	3:35
10.	"Demo Wasurenai" (でも忘れない)	4:32
11.	"Ai no Uta" (愛の唄)	4:54
Total length:		49:41

== Im media ==
- dance
  - for Nihon TV program coupling with love as ending theme
