= Miho Komatsu Best: Once More =

Greatest hits album by Miho Komatsu
- Released: 22 November 2006
- Recorded: 1997–2006
- Genre: Japanese pop
- Length: Disc 1: 62:23; Disc 2: 56:46
- Label: Giza Studio
- Producer: Miho Komatsu (Executive Producer : KANONJI ROCKAKU)

Miho Komatsu chronology
Miho Komatsu 8 : a piece of cake (2006)	Miho Komatsu Best: Once More (2006)

Miho Komatsu Best: Once More (小松未歩 ベスト 〜once more〜) is the first and only greatest hits album by Japanese singer-songwriter Miho Komatsu. It was released on 22 November 2006 under Giza Studio.

== Background ==
Album includes all singles chronologically released - from her debut single Nazo until Koi ni Nare plus new song happy ending.

It was released on same day as her second essay book Hen na Monosashi 2.

Till the date this is last album which Miho Komatsu released before hiatus.

== Charting ==
The album reached #21 in its first week and sold more than 14,000 copies. The album charted for 7 weeks and sold more than 20,000 copies.

== Track listing ==
=== Disc one ===
All the songs were arranged by Hitohito Furui from Garnet Crow (#1–#9), Daisuke Ikeda (#10) and Yoshinobu Ohga from OOM (#11–#14)

All lyrics are written by Miho Komatsu; all music is composed by Miho Komatsu

No.	Title	Length
1.	"Nazo" (謎)	4:37
2.	"Kagayakeru Hoshi" (輝ける星)	4:27
3.	"Negai Goto Hitotsu Dake" (願い事ひとつだけ)	4:42
4.	"anybody's game"	4:08
5.	"Chance" (チャンス)	4:15
6.	"Kōri no ue ni Tatsu yō ni" (氷の上に立つように)	3:54
7.	"Sayonara no Kakera" (さよならのかけら)	4:20
8.	"Saitan Kyori de" (最短距離で)	4:32
9.	"Kaze ga Soyogu Basho" (風がそよぐ場所)	4:20
10.	"Anata ga Iru Kara" (あなたがいるから)	4:37
11.	"Kimi no Me ni wa Utsuranai" (君の瞳には映らない)	4:28
12.	"Love gone"	4:12
13.	"Todomaru Koto no nai Ai" (とどまることのない愛)	5:08
14.	"Saigo no Toride" (さいごの砦)	4:48
Total length:		62:23

=== Disc two ===
All the songs has been arranged by Yoshinobu Ohga from OOM (#1,#2,#12), Akihito Tokunaga from Doa (#3,#5), Satoru Kobayashi (#4,#10) and Hirohito Furui from Garnet Crow (#6–#9,#11,#13)

All lyrics are written by Miho Komatsu; all music is composed by Miho Komatsu

No.	Title	Length
1.	"Aishiteru..." (愛してる...)	4:34
2.	"dance"	3:33
3.	"mysterious love"	4:31
4.	"Futari no Negai" (ふたりの願い)	3:43
5.	"Watashi Sagashi" (私さがし)	5:21
6.	"Tsubasa wa Nakutemo" (翼はなくても)	4:45
7.	"Namida Kirari Tobase" (涙キラリ飛ばせ)	3:55
8.	"Suna no Shiro" (砂のしろ)	4:43
9.	"I~Dare ka..." (I 〜誰か...)	4:09
10.	"I just wanna hold you tight"	4:49
11.	"Anata Iro" (あなた色)	3:54
12.	"Koi ni Nare" (恋になれ...)	4:32
13.	"happy ending" (new song)	4:27
Total length:		56:46
