= Anybody's game =

"anybody's game"

Single by Miho Komatsu

from the album Miho Komatsu 2nd ~Mirai~
- Released: March 18, 1998
- Recorded: 1997・1998
- Genre: J-pop
- Length: 17 minutes
- Label: Amemura-O-Town Record
- Songwriter(s): Miho Komatsu
- Producer(s): ROCKAKU

Miho Komatsu singles chronology
"Negai Goto Hitotsu Dake" (1998)	"anybody's game" (1998)	"Chance" (1998)

anybody's game is the fourth single by the Japanese singer and songwriter Miho Komatsu released under Amemura O-Town Record label. It was released on 14 March 1998. The single reached #9 on the charts in its first week and sold 35,440 copies. It charted for eight weeks and sold 98,990 copies

== Track listing ==
All songs are written and composed by Miho Komatsu and arranged by Hirohito Furui

1. "anybody's game"
2. "Ichiman Meter No Keshiki" (1万メートルの景色)
3. '"anybody's game" (instrumental)
4. "Ichiman Meter No Keshiki" (1万メートルの景色) (instrumental)

== Use in media ==
"anybody's game"

  - Fuji TV program SF as ending theme
  - NHK drama series Ojisan Kaizou Kouza as theme song
  - KBS music program J-rock Artists Best 50 as opening theme

"Ichiman Meter no Keshiki"

  - Yomiuri TV program Japan International Birdman Rallyas theme song
  - Shizuoka Asahi Television informational program Sport Paradise as ending theme
  - CM song for Iwaki Meisei University's radio
