= Anata Iro =

Single by Miho Komatsu

from the album Miho Komatsu 8 ~a piece of cake~
- Released: August 17, 2005
- Recorded: 2005
- Genre: J-pop
- Length: 18 minutes
- Label: Giza Studio
- Songwriter: Miho Komatsu
- Producer: Miho Komatsu (Executive Producer : KANONJI ROCKAKU)

Miho Komatsu singles chronology
"I Just Wanna Hold You Tight" (2005)	"Anata Iro" (2005)	"Koi ni Nare..." (2005)

Anata Iro (あなた色; lit. "Your color") is the 25th single by the Japanese pop singer and songwriter Miho Komatsu released under Giza studio label. It was released 17 August 2005. This is last single where Hirohito Furui did arrangement for Miho Komatsu. The single reached #38 in its first week and sold 3,950 copies. It charted for 2 weeks and sold 4,740 copies. This is the lowest selling single in her career.

== Track listing ==
All songs are written and composed by Miho Komatsu

1. Anata Iro (あなた色)
  - arrangement: Hirohito Furui (Garnet Crow)
  - it was used as an opening theme for the NTV show Eiga Tengoku Chine Bara.
2. Himawari no Komichi (向日葵の小径)
  - arrangement: Hitoshi Okamoto (Garnet Crow)
3. Shitataka Ni, Shinayaka Ni (したたかに しなやかに)
  - arrangement: Furui
4. Anata Iro (あなた色) (instrumental)
