= Miho Komatsu =

Miho Komatsu 小松 未歩
- Born: 30 March 1974 (age 52); Kobe, Hyōgo Prefecture, Japan
- Genres: Anison; J-pop
- Occupations: Singer; songwriter; essayist
- Instruments: Electone; Vocals
- Years active: 1995–2006
- Labels: Giza Studio; Amemura O-Town; Zain Records
- Website: miho-komatsu.com

Japanese name
- Kanji: 小松 未歩
- Hiragana: こまつ みほ
- Katakana: コマツ ミホ
Transcriptions
- Romanization: Komatsu Miho

Miho Komatsu (小松 未歩, Komatsu Miho; born March 30, 1974) is a former Japanese singer and songwriter. Born and raised in Kobe, Japan, Komatsu began her career as a songwriter, writing "Kono Machi de Kimi to Kurashitai" for Field of View. In May 1997, she released her debut single "Nazo", which served as the theme song to the Japanese anime series Case Closed. The song peaked at number nine on the Oricon Weekly Singles Chart in Japan and was certified gold by the Recording Industry Association of Japan (RIAJ). Her debut album of the same title (1997) peaked at number five on the Oricon Weekly Albums Chart in Japan. After releasing a compilation album Miho Komatsu Best: Once More (2006), which peaked at number 21 in Japan, she retired from the music industry with no announcement.

As of 2025, Komatsu has released eleven albums including eight studio albums, 26 singles, and two essay books. During her ten-year career, she never made any television appearances and performed live. As a singer, Komatsu is perhaps best-known for writing and singing four theme songs for Case Closed, such as "Nazo", "Negai goto Hitotsu dake", "Kōri no ue ni Tatsu yō ni", and "Anata ga Iru kara".

As a songwriter, Komatsu has written songs for artists including Field of View, Deen, Wands, Rina Aiuchi, U-ka Saegusa in dB. She has earned three Oricon Weekly Singles Chart top ten songs as a songwriter with "Kimi ga Inai Natsu" by Deen, "Sabitsuita Machine Gun de Ima o Uchinukō" by Wands, and "Precious Place" by Aiuchi.

== Biography ==
=== Early life and beginning of music career ===
When Miho Komatsu was 3 years old, she was influenced by her brother to start playing the electone (electronic organ). Starting in junior high school, she became interested in Western and Japanese music. Her music career then started by the 8th grade when she began making and writing songs on her own and participated in a band as keyboardist around this time as well. When she became a senior in high school, Miho then became a vocalist of a band that played regularly in a Keihanshin live house. In 1996, she recorded her first demo tape, which soon fell into the hands of a producer for Giza Studio. She was signed to the label by the end of 1996.

=== 1997–1999 ===
On 7 April 1997, the on-air version of her debut single Nazo was broadcast as an opening theme for the anime television series Detective Conan.

On 23 April 1997, the band Field of View released single Kono Machi de Kimi to Kurashitai where Miho was credited as a writer. In the media, it was broadcast as an ending theme for TV Asahi's television program Chou Jigen Time Bomber. It was Miho's first song written for another artist. Later, she self-cover this song in her debut album.

On 28 May 1997, Nazo was officially released under the Zain Records label. The single reached into Top 10 of Oricon Weekly Charts and charted more than 32 weeks.

On 18 June 1997, Miho wrote Japanese singer Arisa Tsujio's debut single Aoi Sora ni Deata. In the media, it was promoted as a first ending theme for anime television series Chūka Ichiban!, the on-air version broadcast on April 27. Miho self-covered this song in her debut album.

On 5 July 1997, the on-air version of Kagayakeru Hoshi was broadcast on TV Asahi as an ending theme for Anime television series Manmaru The Ninja Penguin.

On 13 August 1997, she released first LP Record Double Front Project Remix Feat. Miho Komatsu "Nazo" which includes four remixes of debut single Nazo.

On 28 August 1997, the band Deen released twelfth single Kimi ga Inai Natsu where Miho was credited as a writer. The on-air version of the song started to be broadcast on 11 August by Yomiuri TV as an ending theme for Anime television series Detective Conan. Miho self-covered this song in her debut album.

On 3 September 1997, the band Wands released twelfth single Sabitsuita Machine Gun de Ima o Uchi Nukou and Miho was credited as a writer. In the media it was broadcast on Fuji TV as an ending theme for Anime television series Dragon Ball GT. Miho self-cover this song in her debut album. On 25 September, Miho released a second single Kagayakeru Hoshi under Amemura-O-Town Record label.

On 8 October 1997, the band Field of View released their first compilation album Singles Collection +4 and in track Oozora he was Miho credited as a writer. Originally, Oozora he was planned be released as a single (with CD code ZADL-1072) however due to unknown reason it was canceled. Miho self-cover this song in her sixth album in 2003.

On 3 December 1997, Miho released her debut album Nazo. The album includes two released singles and four self-covers from artists she wrote songs for throughout 1997. Album tracks Dream'in in Love was promoted as a theme song for MBS radio's program Sport Dom and Alive for commercial film's image song Astel Kansai Corporation. The debut album reached No. 5 on Oricon Weekly Charts and charted 40 weeks. The album was rewarded with RIAJ's Platina and Gold disc. The album also won 12th Japan Gold Disc Award title Best Artist of the Year. In 1998, the album was 63rd biggest selling album of the year.

On 8 December 1997, the on-air version of Negai Goto Hitotsu Dake start broadcast on YomiuriTV as an ending theme for Anime television series Detective Conan.

On 14 January 1998, she released third single Negai Goto Hitotsu Dake. It reached into Top 10 of Oricon Weekly Charts and charted for 17 weeks. The b-side track Ginga was promoted as an ending theme for ABC television program Wide ABCDE~su. It was 81st best sold single in year 1998. On February the single received reward from RIAJ Gold Disc.

On 18 February 1998, the band Deen released fourteenth single Tooi Sora de and Miho was credited as a writer. In the media it was broadcast as a commercial song for SoftBank Telecom's Least-cost routing. Miho self-cover this song in 20th single Tsubasa wa Nakutemo in 2003.

On 18 March 1998, she released fourth single Anybody's game. In the media it received three broadcasts promotions, as an ending theme Fuji TV program SF, theme song for NHK drama series Ojisan Kaizou Kouza and KBS music program J-rock Artists Best 50. B-side track Ichiman Meter no Keshiki also received three broadcasts promotions, as a theme song for Yomiuri TV program Japan International Birdman Rally, as an ending theme for Shizuoka Asahi Television informational program Sport Paradise and commercial song for Iwaki Meisei University's radio. on 30 March, the on-air version of Chance broadcast on Fuji TV as an theme song for Mezamashi TV.

On 20 May 1998, the band Field of View released eighth single Kawaita Sakebi where Miho was credited as a writer. In the media it was broadcast in April on TV Asahi as an opening theme for Anime television series Yu-Gi-Oh!. Miho self-cover this song in her sixth album in 2003.

On 27 May 1998, the band Deen released fifteenth single Kimi Sae Ireba where Miho was credited as a writer. In the media it was broadcast on 5 May on Fuji TV as a third opening theme for Anime television series Chuuka Ichiban. Miho self-cover this song in her sixth album in 2003.

On 13 July 1998, the on-air version of "Koori no ue ni Tatsu yo ni" broadcasts on Yomiuri TV as an ending theme for Anime television series Detective Conan.

On 19 August 1998, Miho released fifth single Chance. It was Miho's first single to reach into Top 5 Oricon Weekly Charts and charted for 7 weeks. The single has been rewarded in September by RIAJ with a golden disk.

On 14 October 1998, Miho released sixth single "Koori no Ue ni Tatsu you ni". The single reached into Top 5 Oricon weekly charts and charted 14 weeks. On the same month the single was rewarded by RIAJ with a golden disk. In 1998 it was 162nd best sold single in the year.

On 18 November 1998, the band Deen released sixteenth single Tegotae no nai Ai where Miho was credited as a writer. In the media it was broadcast as an ending theme for TBS program Muscle Ranking. Miho self-cover this song in her second album. Miho's self-cover was used as an opening theme for PlayStation game L no Kisetsu ~a piece of memories~.

On 19 December 1998, she released second album Miho Komatsu 2nd : Mirai. The album includes one self-cover and four singles. The singles Koori no Ue ni Tatsu you ni and Anybody's Game had received new album mix. The album track Mirai was promoted as a radio commercial song for Kyushu Electric Power. The album reached into Top 5 of Oricon Weekly charts and charted for 12 weeks. It sold more than 800,000 copies, making it her highest selling album. The album has been rewarded by RIAJ with a platina disk. In 1999 it was best 47th sold album in the year.

In January 1999, the on-air version of Sayonara no Kakera broadcast as an ending theme for TV Asahi program Paku2 Gurumenbo.

On 3 March 1999, Miho released her seventh single Sayonara no Kakera. It is Miho's first maxi single and first single which Miho self-produced.

On 1 April 1999, Miho transferred from Amemura Studio to Giza Studio recording label. In 3 April, the on-air version of Saitan Kyori de broadcast on TBS television program Rank Oukoku as an ending theme. On 17 April, the on-air version of Kaze ga Soyogu Basho broadcast on TBS Anime television series Monster Rancher as an opening theme.

On 8 May 1999, Miho released eighth single Saitan Kyori de under Giza Studio label.

On 30 June 1999, Miho released ninth single Kaze ga Soyogu Basho.

Miho's third album Miho Komatsu 3rd was planned to release sometime in August (with cd code GZCA-1011) however due to unknown reason the release has been delayed for four months.

=== 2000–2002 ===
On 16 February 2000, Miho released third studio album Miho Komatsu 3rd : everywhere. The single "Saitan Kyori de" has received album mix. The album track "Beautiful Life" was promoted on TV Asahi program Yajiuma Wide as an ending theme. The album reached into Top 5 of Oricon Weekly charts and charted for five weeks.

On 22 April 2000, the movie version of "Anata ga Iru Kara" was premiered on Anime movie Case Closed: Captured in Her Eyes.

On 21 June 2000, Miho released tenth single "Anata ga Iru Kara" was released. It became the last Miho single to enter the Top 10 Oricon Weekly Charts.

On 18 October 2000, Miho released eleventh single "Kimi no Me ni wa Utsuranai". In the media it was broadcast as an ending theme for TV Osaka music program Amerock. B-side track "Anata o Aishiteku Koto" was broadcast as a theme song for Jaits project Kaze ni Notte Suteki ni.

On 24 January 2001, Japanese singer-songwriter Rina Aiuchi released her debut album Be Happy where in track "Her Lament: Dare ni mo Kikoenai Kanojo no Sakebi" Miho was credited as writer for the first time after three years. Miho never self-cover this song.

On 31 January 2001, she released twelfth single "Love Gone". In the media it was broadcast as an ending theme for TBS program Kokoro TV and opening theme for Nichion radio music program P.S. Pop Shake.

On 7 March 2001, she released fourth studio album Miho Komatsu 4 : A thousand feelings. It was Miho last album which reached into Top 10 of Oricon Weekly Charts. The single "Love Gone" has received album mix. The album tracks "Hold me tight" was used as an opening theme for PlayStation 2 game Missing Blue and "I don't know the truth" as an ending theme for same PlayStation 2 game Missing Blue.

On 30 May 2001, she released thirteenth single "Todomaru Koto no nai Ai".

On 8 August 2001, she released fourteenth single "Saigo no Toride". B-side track includes remix version of "Kagayakeru Hoshi" by Yoshinobu Ohga.

In October 2001, an official website was launched.

On 5 December 2001, she released fifteenth single "Aishiteru". On 19 December, two of Miho's singles "Love Gone" and "Todomaru Koto no nai Ai" were included in the compilation album Giza Studio Masterpiece Blend 2001.

On 29 May 2002, one day after Miho crossed fifth debut anniversary she released sixteenth single "Dance". In the media it was broadcast as an ending theme for NTV show CW Love. It became her first media song after year.

On 17 July 2002, the Giza Studio has released cover album GIZA studio MAI-K & FRIENDS HOTROD BEACH PARTY where Miho was credited as guest vocal in track "Surfin' U.S.A." by The Beach Boys.

On 25 September 2002, she released fifth studio album Miho Komatsu 5 : source. The album includes 4 singles.

On 27 November 2002, she released seventeenth single "Mysterious Love" and on the same day her first remix album Miho Komatsu Wonderful World: Single Remixes & More. In the media the single was broadcast as an ending theme for NTV show TV Ojamanbou.

In December 2002, Miho's singles "Dance" and album track "Gift" were included in the compilation album Giza Studio Masterpiece Blend 2002.

=== 2003–2004 ===
On 19 March 2003, she released eighteenth single Futari no Negai. In the media it was broadcast as an opening theme for NTV music program AX Music T.V

On 25 June 2003, she released nineteenth single Watashi Sagashi.

On 11 August 2003, Miho launched on her website Diary section.

On 25 September 2003, she released sixth album Miho Komatsu 6th : Hanano. The album includes 3 singles and 3 self-covers. Her fifth single Chance has received new remix with subtitle Rechance by Hiroshi Asai from The★tambourines.

On 26 November 2003, she released multiple releases: twentieth single Tsubasa wa Nakutemo which B-side track includes self-cover of Deen's Tooi Sora de, ballad compilation album Lyrics and first essay book Henna Monosashi.

In December 2003, Miho's singles Watashi Sagashi and album track Futari no Negai were included in the compilation album Giza Studio Masterpiece Blend 2003.

On 28 April 2004, she released twenty-first single Namida Kirari Tobase.

On 28 July 2004, she released twenty-second single Suna no Shiro.

On 20 October 2004, she released twenty-third single I: Dareka.... In the media it was broadcast as a theme song for the NTV show Music Fighter. It became her first media song after year and half.

On 17 November 2004, the band U-ka Saegusa in dB released second album U-ka saegusa IN db II where in track Watashi o Yurusanaide Miho was credited as a writer for the first time in three years. Miho never self-cover this song.

=== 2005–2006 ===
On 25 January 2005, she released seventh studio album Miho Komatsu 7 : prime number. The album includes four singles.

On 3 April 2005, the on-air version of I just wanna hold you tight was broadcast on TV Tokyo as an ending theme for Anime television series MÄR. It became her anime theme song for the first time after six years.

On 11 May 2005, Japanese singer-songwriter Aiko Kitahara released second studio album Message where in album track Message was Miho credited as a writer. Miho never self-cover this song.

On 18 May 2005, she released twenty-fourteenth single I just wanna hold you tight.

On 27 July 2005, Japanese singer Sayuri Iwata released second single Fukigen ni Naru Watashi where Miho was credited as a writer. In the media it was broadcast as an ending theme for Anime television series MÄR. Miho self-covered this song in her final studio album.

On 17 August 2005, she released twenty-fifteenth single Anata Iro. In the media it was broadcast as an opening theme Nihon TV movie program Eiga Tengoku Chine★Para.

On 7 December 2005, she released her final single Koi ni Nare.... In the media it was broadcast as an ending theme for Tokyo Broadcasting System Television variety program Tokoro Man Yuuki.

On the same day, Japanese singer Sayuri Iwata releases studio album Thank You for... where in album track Hitori Janai was Miho credited as a writer. Miho never self-cover this song.

On 29 March 2006, Japanese singer-songwriter Rina Aiuchi released 26th single Glorious/Precious Place, in Glorious she was credited as a writer for the last time. Miho never self-cover this song.

On 26 April 2006, she released final studio album Miho Komatsu 8 : a piece of cake. The album includes 3 final singles.

On 22 November 2006, she released first compilation album Miho Komatsu Best ~once more~ and second essay book Hen na Monosashi 2. The album includes new unreleased song Happy ending.

=== Afterwards ===
Until January 2009, she kept her blog active.

In 7 April, 2011, Sai Saida (斉田才), a producer in Giza Studio, confirmed that Komatsu is "very close to her retirement" on his Twitter. In June, she was moved on the official Beinggiza website into the Other Artist category.

On OLDIES GOODIES hosted by FM Shiga (FM滋賀) in April 10, 2021, when Hirofumi Banba (ばんばひろふみ) mentioned Komatsu, he said, "It was very unfortunate to Komatsu. I wonder if only she had tried harder." Daiko Nagato then replied the reason of Komatsu's quit is because she "wanted to disappear from the public eye" to Banba.

In May 2022, all the songs and albums Komatsu has released were made available on streaming services, in celebration of 25 years anniversary since her debut in May 1997.

== Discography ==
- Nazo (1997)
- Miho Komatsu 2nd: Mirai (1998)
- Miho Komatsu 3rd: Everywhere (2000)
- Miho Komatsu 4: A Thousand Feelings (2001)
- Miho Komatsu 5: Source (2002)
- Miho Komatsu 6th: Hanano (2003)
- Miho Komatsu 7: Prime Number (2005)
- Miho Komatsu 8: A Piece of Cake (2006)

== Books ==
Title	Release	ISBN
Hen na Monosashi (ヘンな物さし). Miho Komatsu Essay & Photograph	13 November 2003	ISBN 4-916019-39-3
Hen na Monosashi 2 (ヘンな物さし 2). Miho Komatsu Essay & Photograph	22 November 2006	ISBN 4-916019-48-2

== List of provided works ==
=== Composed songs ===
- Arisa Tsujio
  - Aoi Sora ni Deaeta (青い空に出逢えた)
- Field of View
  - Kono Machi de Kimi to Kurashitai (この街で君と暮らしたい)
  - Kawaita Sakebi (渇いた叫び)
  - Oozora E (大空へ)
- Deen
  - Kimi ga Inai Natsu (君がいない夏)
  - Tooi Sora de (遠い空で)
  - Kimi Sae Ireba (君さえいれば)
  - Tegotae no nai Ai (手ごたえのない愛)
- Wands
  - Sabitsuita Machine Gun de Ima o Uchimekō (錆びついたマシンガンで今を撃ち抜こう)
- Rina Aiuchi
  - Her Lament ~Dare Ni Mo Kikoenai Kanojo No Sakebi~ (Her Lament ~誰にも聞こえない彼女の叫び~)
  - Precious Place
- Sayuri Iwata
  - Fukigen ni naru Watashi (不機嫌になる私)
  - Hitori Ja Nai (ひとりじゃない)
- U-ka Saegusa in dB
  - Watashi o Yurusanaide (私を許さないで)
- Aiko Kitahara
  - Message

== Magazine appearances ==
=== From J-Groove Magazine ===
- March 2001 Vol.5
- April 2001 Vol.6
- July 2001 Vol.9
- September 2001 Vol.11
- January 2002 Vol.15
- July 2002 Vol.21
- November 2002 Vol.25
- January 2003 Vol.27
- May 2003 Vol.31
- August 2003 Vol.34
- November 2003 Vol.37

=== From Music Freak Magazine ===
- May 1997 Vol.30: Information
- September 1997 Vol.34: Information
- November 1997 Vol.36: Information
- December 1997 Vol.37: 1st Album "Nazo" Liner Notes
- January 1998 Vol.38: Information
- February 1998 Vol.39: Information
- March 1998 Vol.40: Anybody Game interview/Miho Komatsu's recommended movies
- August 1998 Vol.45: Chance interview
- September 1998 Vol.46: Information
- October 1998 Vol.47: Koori no Ue ni tatsu you ni Interview
- December 1998 Vol.49: 2nd album Miho Komatsu 2nd "Mirai" Interview, Review
- February 1999 Vol.51: Information, Best Top 10 Miho Komatsu songs by readers inquiry
- March 1999 Vol.52: Sayonara no Kakera Interview, Information
- April 1999 Vol.53: Information
- May 1999 Vol.54: Saitan Kyori de Interview, Information
- June 1999 Vol.55: Kaze ga Soyogu Basho Interview
- January 2000 Vol.62: Information
- February 2000 Vol.63: Miho Komatsu 3rd Everywhere Interview and Self Liner Notes
- March 2000 Vol.64: Review
- June 2000 Vol.67: Anata ga Iru Kara Interview
- September 2000 Vol.70: Information
- October 2000 Vol.71: Kimi no Me ni wa Utsuranai Interview
- December 2000 Vol.73: New Year Card, Information
- January 2001 Vol.74: Love Gone Interview
- February 2001 Vol.75: Information
- March 2001 Vol.76: Miho Komatsu 4th A Thousand Feelings
- April 2001 Vol.77: Information
- May 2001 Vol.78: Todomaru Koto no Nai Ai interview, Information
- August 2001 Vol.81: Saigo no Toride interview
- November 2001 Vol.84: Information
- December 2001 Vol.85: Aishiteru Interview
- January 2002 Vol.86: New Year Card 2002
- May 2002 Vol.90: Dance Interview
- August 2002 Vol.93: Information
- September 2002 Vol.94: Miho Komatsu 5: Source Interview and Self Liner Notes
- October 2002 Vol.95: Information
- November 2002 Vol.96: Mysterious Love Interview
