= Miho Komatsu 7: Prime Number =

Studio album by Miho Komatsu
- Released: 26 January 2005
- Recorded: 2003–2005
- Genre: Japanese pop
- Length: 55:03
- Label: Giza Studio
- Producer: Miho Komatsu (Executive Producer: KANONJI ROCKAKU)

Miho Komatsu chronology
Lyrics (2003)	Miho Komatsu 7: Prime Number (2005)	Miho Komatsu 8: A Piece of Cake (2006)

Singles from Miho Komatsu 7: Prime Number
- 1. "Tsubasa wa Nakutemo" Released: 26 November 2003; 2. "Namida Kirari Tobase" Released: 28 April 2004; 3. "Suna no Shiro" Released: 28 July 2004; 4. "I: Dareka..." Released: 20 October 2004

Miho Komatsu 7: Prime Number (小松未歩 7 〜prime number〜) is the seventh studio album of Japanese singer-songwriter Miho Komatsu. It was released on 26 January 2005 under Giza Studio.

== Background ==
Album includes previous 4 released singles, since Tsubasa wa Nakutemo till I~dare ka.

The single Tsubasa wa Nakutemo has received remix under subtitle Extravagant mix by Mr.Lee.

Namida Kirari Tobase has received as well new album arrangement under title album mix. Compared to the single release, in the beginning the key chords are higher and in the middle of song guitar solo was specially added.

== Charting performance ==
The album debuted at number 30 on Oricon Weekly Albums Charts with 9,916 sold copies. The album charted for 4 weeks and totally sold 13,807 copies.

== Track listing ==
All lyrics are written by Miho Komatsu; all music is composed by Miho Komatsu.

No.	Title	Arrangers	Length
1.	"Tsubasa wa Nakutemo (翼はなくても)"	Hirohito Furui (Garnet Crow)	4:46
2.	"Hito wa Oomukashi, Umi ni Sundeta kara (ひとは大昔 海に棲んでたから)"	Yoshinobu Ohga	4:09
3.	"Suna no Shiro (砂のしろ)"	Furui	4:44
4.	"Kokyou (故郷)"	Furui	4:40
5.	"sha la la..."	Hitoshi Okamoto (Garnet Crow)	3:24
6.	"Jaa ne, Sore Jaa ne (じゃあね それじゃあね)"	Daisuke Ikeda	4:14
7.	"Diplomacy"	Ohga	3:38
8.	"Koigokoro (恋心)"	Satoru Kobayashi	4:21
9.	"Tokyo Byori (東京日和)"	Kobayashi	4:21
10.	"Namida Kirari Tobase (涙キラリ飛ばせ)" (album mix)	Furui	3:55
11.	"I~ Dareka... (I 〜誰か...)"	Furui	4:10
12.	"Kimi no Naseru Waza (君のなせるワザ)"	Ohga	3:59
13.	"Tsubasa wa Nakutemo" (~Extravagant mix~)	Mr.Lee	4:27

== In media ==
- I: Dareka...
  - for Nihon TV music program Ongaku Senshi MUSIC FIGHTER as theme song
