= Watashi Sagashi =

Single by Miho Komatsu

from the album Miho Komatsu 6th ~Hanano~
- Released: June 25, 2003
- Recorded: 2003
- Genre: J-pop
- Length: 19 minutes
- Label: Giza Studio
- Songwriter(s): Miho Komatsu
- Producer(s): Miho Komatsu (Executive Producer : KANONJI ROCKAKU)

Miho Komatsu singles chronology
"Futari no Negai" (2002)	"Watashi Sagashi" (2003)	"Tsubasa wa Nakutemo" (2003)

Watashi Sagashi (私さがし, lit. "I look for") is a single by Japanese pop singer Miho Komatsu It was released on 25 June 2003 under the Giza Studio. The single reached #30 in its first week and sold 5,873 copies. It charted for 3 weeks and sold 7,413 copies in total.

== Track listing ==
All songs are written and composed by Miho Komatsu and arranged by Akihito Tokunaga (Doa).

1. Watashi Sagashi (私さがし)
2. Toori Ame (通り雨)
3. Toori Ame (通り雨) (instrumental)
4. Watashi Sagashi (私さがし) (instrumental)
