= Suna no Shiro (song) =

Single by Miho Komatsu

from the album Miho Komatsu 7 ~prime number~
- Released: July 28, 2004
- Recorded: 2004
- Genre: J-pop
- Length: 17 minutes
- Label: Giza Studio
- Songwriter(s): Miho Komatsu
- Producer(s): Miho Komatsu; KANONJI ROCKAKU

Miho Komatsu singles chronology
"Namida Kirari Tobase" (2003)	"Suna no Shiro" (2004)	"I~Dareka..." (2004)

Suna no Shiro (砂のしろ, Sand castle) is the 22nd single of the Japanese pop singer and songwriter Miho Komatsu released under Giza studio label. It was released on 28 July 2004. The single reached #32 and sold 4,969 copies. It is charted for 2 weeks and sold 5,796 copies.

== Track list ==
All songs are written and composed by Miho Komatsu

1. "Suna no Shiro" (砂のしろ)
  - arrangement: Hirohito Furui (Garnet Crow)
2. "Itsuka wa Daia no Koi" (いつかはダイアの恋)
  - arrangement: Hitoshi Okamoto (Garnet Crow)
3. "sha la la..."
  - arrangement: Hitoshi Okamoto
4. "Suna no Shiro" (砂のしろ) (instrumental)
