= Saigo no Toride =

Single by Miho Komatsu

from the album Miho Komatsu 5 ~source~
- Released: August 8, 2001
- Recorded: 2001
- Genre: J-pop
- Length: 25 minutes
- Label: Giza Studio
- Songwriter(s): Miho Komatsu
- Producer(s): Miho Komatsu (Executive Producer : KANONJI ROCKAKU)

Miho Komatsu singles chronology
"Todomaru Koto no nai Ai" (2001)	"Saigo no Toride" (2001)	"Aishiteru..." (2001)

"Saigo no Toride" (さいごの砦, lit. "Final Fortress") is Miho Komatsu's 14th single released under the Giza Studio label. It was released 8 August 2001. The single reached #30 rank in its first week and sold 11,810 copies. It charted for two weeks and in total sold 15,360 copies.

== Track listing ==
All songs are written and composed by Miho Komatsu and arranged by Yoshinobu Ohga

1. Saigo no Toride (さいごの砦)
2. Ai no Uta (愛の唄)
3. Kagayakeru Hoshi<delightful ver.> (輝ける星 <delightful ver.>)
  - re-arranged version of Miho Komatsu's 2nd single Kagayakeru Hoshi
4. Saigo no Toride (さいごの砦) (instrumental)
5. Ai no Uta (愛の唄) (instrumental)
