= Futari no Negai =

Single by Miho Komatsu

from the album Miho Komatsu 6th ~Hanano~
- Released: March 19, 2003
- Recorded: 2002・2003
- Genre: J-pop
- Length: 16 minutes
- Label: Giza Studio
- Songwriter(s): Miho Komatsu
- Producer(s): Miho Komatsu (Executive Producer : KANONJI ROCKAKU)

Miho Komatsu singles chronology
"mysterious love" (2002)	"Futari no Negai" (2003)	"Watashi Sagashi" (2003)

Futari no Negai (ふたりの願い, lit. Two wishes) is a single by Japanese pop singer Miho Komatsu released under Giza studio label. It was released 19 March 2003. The single reached #30 in its first week and sold 5,832 copies. It is charted for 3 weeks and sold 7,530 copies in total.

== Track listing ==
All songs are written and composed by Miho Komatsu

1. Futari no Negai (ふたりの願い)
  - arrangement: Satoru Kobayashi
  - the song was used as an opening song for NTV show AX Music T.V
2. Sakura Ga Mau Koro (桜が舞うころ)
  - arrangement: Yoshinobu Ohga
3. Futari no Negai (桜が舞うころ) (instrumental)
4. Sakura Ga Mau Koro (桜が舞うころ) (instrumental)
