= Manmaru The Ninja Penguin =

Japanese manga series and anime

- Cover of the first volume of Ninpen Manmaru

忍ペンまん丸
- Genre: Comedy
- Manga
- Written by: Mikio Igarashi
- Published by: Enix
- Magazine: Monthly Shōnen Gangan
- Original run: April 1995 – April 1999
- Volumes: 11
- Anime television series
- Directed by: Tetsuo Yasumi
- Produced by: Atsushi Kaji; Tetsuya Watanabe; Yoshio Kato
- Music by: Meiyu Otani; Norio Ido
- Studio: Shin-Ei Animation
- Original network: ANN (TV Asahi)
- Original run: July 5, 1997 – March 28, 1998
- Episodes: 48

Manmaru The Ninja Penguin, released in Japan as Ninpen Manmaru (忍ペンまん丸), is a Japanese manga series written and illustrated by Mikio Igarashi. It was serialized in the Enix magazine Monthly Shōnen Gangan from 1995 to 1999. A 48-episode anime adaptation was produced by Shin-Ei Animation, directed by Tetsuo Yasumi, and broadcast on TV Asahi between July 5, 1997, and March 28, 1998.

== Characters ==
- Manmaru (まん丸) Voiced by: Haruna Ikezawa
- Tanutaro (タヌ太郎) Voiced by: Kappei Yamaguchi
- Tsunejiro (ツネ次郎) Voiced by: Tomokazu Seki

== Anime ==
The anime uses two pieces of theme music. "What surprised me" (ボクってまんまる, Bokutte Manmaru) by Yumi Adachi is the series' opening theme while "Kagayakeru Hoshi" (輝ける星, lit. 'Stars Shining') by Miho Komatsu is the series' ending theme.

== Video game ==
A 3D platform game based on Ninpen Manmaru was developed by TamTam and published by Enix for the Sega Saturn in Japan on December 18, 1997.

The game follows Manmaru through six stages featuring platforming challenges, enemies and boss battles. Players must navigate four areas within each stage under time limits while collecting coins and avoiding obstacles. Collecting 100 coins awards an extra life, while completing the areas quickly provides additional bonuses. The game also introduces original characters, including a female ninja named Kaede.

In an interview published alongside the game's release, original manga creator Mikio Igarashi recalled playing the Saturn adaptation during development and expressed surprise at its smooth animation. He explained that he had requested that the game not be excessively difficult, hoping that it would be accessible to a broad range of players.
