= I: Dareka... =

"I~ Dareka..."

Single by Miho Komatsu

from the album Miho Komatsu 7 ~prime number~
- Released: October 20, 2004
- Recorded: 2004
- Genre: J-pop
- Length: 16 minutes
- Label: Giza Studio
- Songwriter: Miho Komatsu
- Producer: Miho Komatsu (Executive Producer : KANONJI ROCKAKU)

Miho Komatsu singles chronology
"Suna no Shiro" (2004)	"I~ Dareka..." (2004)	"I Just Wanna Hold You Tight" (2005)

"I~ Dareka..." (I～誰か...; I~Someone...) is the 23rd single by the Japanese pop singer and songwriter Miho Komatsu released under Giza studio label. It was released 20 October 2004. The single reached #29 and sold 5,204 copies. It charted for 3 weeks and sold 6,856 copies overall.

== Track list ==
All songs are written and composed by Miho Komatsu

1. "I~ Dareka..." (I～誰か...)
  - arrangement: Hirohito Furui (Garnet Crow)
  - it was used as theme song for the NTV show Music Fighter
2. "Camouflage" (カムフラージュ)
  - arrangement: Hiroshi Asai (The Tambourines)
3. "sun and moon"
  - arrangement: Hitoshi Okamoto (Garnet Crow)
4. "I~ Dareka..." (I～誰か...) (instrumental)
