= Miho Komatsu 3rd: Everywhere =

Studio album by Miho Komatsu
- Released: 16 February 2000
- Recorded: 1999–2000
- Genre: Japanese pop
- Length: 52:08
- Label: Giza Studio
- Producer: ROCKAKU

Miho Komatsu chronology
Miho Komatsu 2nd: Mirai (1998)	Miho Komatsu 3rd: Everywhere (2000)	Miho Komatsu 4: A thousand feelings (2001)

Singles from Miho Komatsu 3rd ~ everywhere ~
- 1. "Sayonara no Kakera" Released: 3 March 1999; 2. "Saitan Kyori de" Released: 8 May 1999; 3. "Kaze ga Soyogu Basho" Released: 30 June 1999

Miho Komatsu 3rd: Everywhere (小松未歩 3rd ~ everywhere ~) is the third studio album by Japanese singer-songwriter Miho Komatsu. It was released on 16 February 2000 under Giza Studio.

== Background ==
This is her first album released under new recording label Giza Studio which she moved to in April, 1999.

The album includes 3 previously released singles, Sayonara no Kakera, Saitan Kyori de, and Kaze ga Soyogu Basho. Although her 7th single was released in her previous label, Amemura Records, her 8th single was released in late spring under GIZA.

Saitan Kyori has received completely new instrumentation for this album; it doesn't include a subtitle. Compared to the single version, the intro starts more quietly, and the drum solo was completely cut off.

The song "As" has later received a rearranged version in her single Anata ga Iru Kara as a b-side track. The song Boyfriend from the single Sayonara no Kakera as a b-side track was included in this album as well.

Some songs from the album, including Ame ga Furu Tabi ni, Boyfriend, Yume to Genjitsu no Hazama and As were released in her conceptual album Lyrics in 2003.

Takeshi Hayama, the famous arranger at Being Inc. who provided arrangements for many popular artists, including Zard, was involved in album production along with Kūron Oshiro and Masato Kitano.

== Charting ==
The album reached #5 in its first week with 72,180 sold copies. Album charted for 5 weeks and sold more than 100,000 copies in total.

== Track listing ==
All lyrics are written by Miho Komatsu; all music is composed by Miho Komatsu

No.	Title	Arrangers	Length
1.	"Saitan Kyori de" (最短距離で)	Hirohito Furui (Garnet Crow)	4:34
2.	"Beautiful Life"	Takeshi Hayama	4:42
3.	"As"	Hayama	5:44
4.	"Kaze ga Soyogu Basho" (風がそよぐ場所)	Furui	4:20
5.	"sickness"	Hayama	5:36
6.	"No time to fall"	Furui	4:13
7.	"Holding, Holding on"	Furui	4:21
8.	"Boy Friend"	Furui	4:19
9.	"Sayonara no Kakera" (さよならのかけら)	Furui	4:21
10.	"Yume To Genjitsu No Hazama" (夢と現実の狭間)	Kūron Oshiro	5:20
11.	"Ame ga Furu Tabi ni" (雨が降る度に)	Masato Kitano; Oshiro	4:44
Total length:			52:08

== In media ==
- Kaze ga Soyogu Basho
  - for Anime television series Monster Rancher as opening theme
- Sayonara no Kakera
  - for TV Asahi variety program Paku2 Gurumenbo as ending theme
- Saitan Kyori de
  - for Tokyo Broadcasting System Television variety program Rank Oukoku as opening theme
- BEAUTIFUL LIFE
  - for TV Asahi program Yajiuma Wide as ending theme
