= Namida Kirari Tobase =

Single by Miho Komatsu

from the album Miho Komatsu 7 ~prime number~
- Released: April 28, 2004
- Recorded: 2003・2004
- Genre: J-pop
- Length: 17 minutes
- Label: Giza Studio
- Songwriter(s): Miho Komatsu
- Producer(s): Miho Komatsu (Executive Producer : KANONJI ROCKAKU)

Miho Komatsu singles chronology
"Tsubasa wa Nakutemo" (2003)	"Namida Kirari Tobase" (2004)	"Suna no Shiro" (2004)

Namida Kirari Tobase (涙キラリ飛ばせ, Throw Your Tears Right Away) is a single by Japanese pop singer and songwriter, Miho Komatsu. It was released under Giza studio label, on 28 April, 2004. The single reached #31 in its first week and sold 5,285 copies, charted for three weeks and sold 6,670 copies in total.

== Track listing ==
All songs are written and composed by Miho Komatsu

1. Namida Kirari Tobase (涙キラリ飛ばせ)
  - arrangement: Hirohito Furui (Garnet Crow)
2. Koi Kokoro (恋心)
  - arrangement: Satoru Kobayashi
3. calling
  - arrangement: Furui
4. Namida Kirari Tobase (涙キラリ飛ばせ) (instrumental)
