= Miho Komatsu 6th: Hanano =

Studio album by Miho Komatsu
- Released: 25 September 2003
- Recorded: 2002–2003
- Genre: Japanese pop
- Length: 57:23
- Label: Giza Studio
- Producer: Miho Komatsu (Executive Producer: KANONJI ROCKAKU)

Miho Komatsu chronology
Miho Komatsu 5: Source (2002)	Miho Komatsu 6th: Hanano (2003)	Lyrics (2003)

Singles from Miho Komatsu 6th: Hanano
- 1. "Mysterious Love" Released: 27 November 2002; 2. "Futari no Negai" Released: 19 March 2003; 3. "Watashi Sagashi" Released: 25 June 2003

Miho Komatsu 6th: Hanano (小松未歩 6th 〜花野〜) is the sixth studio album of Japanese singer and songwriter Miho Komatsu. It was released on 25 September 2003 through Giza Studio label.

== Background ==
The album includes previously 3 released singles, mysterious love, Futari no Negai and Watashi Sagashi.

Hirohito Furui from Garnet Crow was involved with the album production as an arranger.

Her fifth single Chance has received new remix with subtitle Rechance by Hiroshi Asai from The★tambourines.

Some b-side tracks from her previously released singles Watashi Sagashi and mysterious love were included in the album, such as Toori Ame and Tokubetsu ni Naru Hi.

For first time after 5 years, she did self cover of her written songs for Being artist Field of View's Oozora he, Kawaita Sakebi and Deen's Kimi Sae Ireba. Kimi Sae Ireba was included in Deen's compilation albums Deen The Best Kiseki and DEEN The Best FOREVER Complete Singles+.

The singles Futari no Negai and Watashi Sagashi were included in the compilation album Giza Studio Masterpiece Blend 2003.

== Charting ==
The album reached #27 rank first week with 12,207 sold copies. Album charted for 8 weeks and totally sold 17,805 copies.

== Track listing ==
All lyrics are written by Miho Komatsu; all music is composed by Miho Komatsu

No.	Title	Arrangers	Length
1.	"mysterious love"	Akihito Tokunaga (Doa)	4:30
2.	"Futari no Negai" (ふたりの願い)	Satoru Kobayashi	3:34
3.	"Toori Ame" (通り雨)	Tokunaga	3:46
4.	"Rakuen" (楽園)	Daisuke Ikeda	4:51
5.	"Ashita wo Motezuni" (明日を待てずに)	Hirohito Furui (Garnet Crow)	4:54
6.	"Oozora he" (大空へ, originally performed by Field of View)	Hitoshi Okamoto (Garnet Crow)	4:04
7.	"Kawaita Sakebi" (渇いた叫び, originally performed by Field of View)	Tokunaga	4:58
8.	"Kimi Sae Ireba" (君さえいれば, originally performed by Deen)	Yoshinobu Ohga	4:37
9.	"Chance ~RECHANCE~" (チャンス 〜RECHANCE〜)	Hiroshi Asai (The Tambourines)	4:08
10.	"Last Letter"	Ikeda	4:30
11.	"Tokubetsu ni Naru Hi" (特別になる日)	Okamoto	4:04
12.	"Boku ni Azukete" (僕にあずけて)	Ohga	4:07
13.	"Watashi Sagashi" (私さがし)	Tokunaga	5:20

== In media ==
- mysterious love
  - for Nihon TV variety program TV Ojama Manpou as ending theme
- Futari no Negai
  - for Nihon TV music program AX MUSIC-TV as theme song
