= Mysterious love =

"mysterious love"

Single by Miho Komatsu

from the album Miho Komatsu 6th ~Hanano~
- Released: November 27, 2002
- Recorded: 2002
- Genre: J-pop
- Length: 17 minutes
- Label: Giza Studio
- Songwriter: Miho Komatsu
- Producer: Miho Komatsu (Executive Producer : KANONJI ROCKAKU)

Miho Komatsu singles chronology
| "dance" (2002) | "mysterious love" (2002) | "Futari no Negai" (2003) |

mysterious love is the 17th single by the Japanese pop singer Miho Komatsu released under Giza studio label. It was released 27 November 2002. The single reached #16 rank first week and sold 9,055 copies. It is charted for 3 weeks and sold totally 11,469 copies. This is last time when single sold more than ten thousand copies and reach top 20 ranks in Oricon.

== Track list ==
All songs are written and composed by Miho Komatsu

1. mysterious love
  - arrangement: Akihito Tokunaga (Doa)
  - the song was used as an ending song for NTV show TV Ojamanbou.
2. Tokubetsu ni naru hi (特別になる日)
  - arrangement: Hitoshi Okamoto (Garnet Crow)
3. style of my own ~yuukei~ (style of my own 〜遊景〜)
  - arrangement and remix: Hiroshi Asai (The Tambourines)
  - rearranged version of style of my own from 5th album Miho Komatsu 5 ~source~
4. mysterious love (instrumental)
