= Kaze ga Soyogu Basho =

Single by Miho Komatsu

from the album Miho Komatsu 3rd ~ everywhere ~
- Released: June 30, 1999
- Recorded: 1999
- Genre: J-pop
- Length: 18 minutes
- Label: Giza Studio
- Songwriter: Miho Komatsu
- Producer: ROCKAKU

Miho Komatsu singles chronology
"Saitan Kyori de" (1999)	"Kaze ga Soyogu Basho" (1999)	"Anata ga Iru kara" (2000)

"Kaze ga Soyogu Basho" (風がそよぐ場所; lit. 'Where the wind blows') is the ninth single of the Japanese pop singer Miho Komatsu released under Giza Studio label. The single was released one and a half months after the previous single Saitan Kyori De. This is the last single released in 8 cm single format. The single reached #9 in its first week and sold 33,240. It charted for 8 weeks and sold 52,650 copies.

== Track listing ==
All songs are written and composed by Miho Komatsu and arranged by Hirohito Furui

1. "Kaze ga Soyogu Basho" (風がそよぐ場所)
  - the song was used as the first opening song for the anime series Monster Rancher. OA (on air) and single version have different arrangement. OA version was never officially released on CDs.
2. "Elephant"
3. "Kaze ga Soyogu Basho" (風がそよぐ場所) (instrumental)
4. "Elephant" (instrumental)
