= Negai goto Hitotsu dake =

"Negai Goto Hitotsu Dake"

Single by Miho Komatsu

from the album Miho Komatsu 2nd ~Mirai~
- Released: January 14, 1998
- Recorded: 1997
- Genre: J-pop
- Length: 19 minutes
- Label: Amemura-O-Town Record
- Songwriter: Miho Komatsu
- Producer: ROCKAKU

Miho Komatsu singles chronology
"Kagayakeru Hoshi" (1997)	"Negai Goto Hitotsu Dake" (1998)	"anybody's game" (1998)

Negai Goto Hitotsu Dake (願い事ひとつだけ; lit. 'One Only Wish') is the 3rd single of Miho Komatsu released under Amemura O-Town Record label. The single reached #8 rank for first week and sold 44,460 copies. The single charted for 17 weeks and sold totally 294,580 copies.

== Track list ==
All lyrics are written by Miho Komatsu; all music is composed by Miho Komatsu

No.	Title	Arrangers	Length
1.	"Negai Goto Hitotsu Dake" (願い事ひとつだけ)	Hirohito Furui	4:45
2.	"Ginga" (銀河)	Hirohito Furui	4:27
3.	"Negai Goto Hitotsu Dake" ((instrumental))	Hirohito Furui	4:45
4.	"Ginga" ((instrumental))	Hirohito Furui	4:27

== In media ==
- Negai Goto Hitotsu Dake
  - for Anime television series Case Closed (Detective Conan) as 5th ending theme
- Ginga
  - for ABC program Wide ABCDE~su as ending theme

== Cover ==
In 2006, it was covered by Mikuni Shimokawa in her album Remember. In 2008 Aiuchi Rina and U-ka Saegusa in dB covered this song in their single "Nanatsu no Umi o Wataru Kaze no Yō ni".
