= Miho Komatsu 8: A Piece of Cake =

Studio album by Miho Komatsu
- Released: 26 April 2006
- Recorded: 2005–2006
- Genre: Japanese pop
- Length: 51:29
- Label: Giza Studio
- Producer: Miho Komatsu (Executive Producer: KANONJI ROCKAKU)

Miho Komatsu chronology
Miho Komatsu 7: Prime Number (2005)	Miho Komatsu 8: A Piece of Cake (2006)	Miho Komatsu Best: Once More (2006)

Singles from Miho Komatsu 8: A Piece of Cake
- 1. "I Just Wanna Hold You Tight" Released: 18 May 2005; 2. "Anata Iro" Released: 17 August 2005; 3. "Koi ni Nare..." Released: 7 December 2005

Miho Komatsu 8: A Piece of Cake (小松未歩 8 〜a piece of cake〜) is the final studio album of Japanese singer-songwriter Miho Komatsu. It was released on 26 April 2006 under Giza Studio.

== Background ==
The album includes three previously released singles, since "I just wanna hold you tight" through "Koi ni nare".

In this album, she covered her self-written song "Fukigen ni Naru Watashi", which was originally performed by Japanese singer Sayuri Iwata.

== Charting ==
The album reached #35 rank first week with 6,663 sold copies. Album charted for 4 weeks and totally sold 10,072 copies. This is the lowest sold studio album in her career.

== Track listing ==
All lyrics are written by Miho Komatsu; all music is composed by Miho Komatsu

No.	Title	Arrangers	Length
1.	"Aoi Natsu (蒼い夏)"	Hirohito Furui (Garnet Crow)	3:24
2.	"deep grief"	Satoru Kobayashi	4:54
3.	"Koi ni Nare... (恋になれ...)"	Yoshinobu Ohga	4:32
4.	"my darling"	Ohga	3:17
5.	"Haru no Kioku (はるのきおく)"	Hitoshi Okamoto (Garnet Crow)	4:52
6.	"Kamisama wa Jitto Miteru (神様はジッと見てる)"	Hiroshi Asai (The Tambourines)	3:36
7.	"Anata Iro (あなた色)"	Furui	3:55
8.	"I just wanna hold you tight"	Kobayashi	4:48
9.	"Fukigen ni Naru Watashi (不機嫌になる私)" (originally performed by Sayuri Iwata)	Ohga	3:52
10.	"Himawari no Komichi (向日葵の小径)"	Okamoto	4:38
11.	"Anata no Te (アナタノ手)"	Furui	3:49
12.	"Namida no Ato ni (涙のあとに)"	Daisuke Ikeda	5:58
Total length:			51:29

== In media ==
- I just wanna hold you tight
  - for Anime television series MÄR as ending theme
- Anata Iro
  - for Nihon TV movie program Eiga Tengoku Chine★Para as grand opening theme
- Koi ni Nare
  - for Tokyo Broadcasting System Television variety program Tokoro Man Yuuki as ending theme
