= Chance (Miho Komatsu song) =

Single by Miho Komatsu

from the album Miho Komatsu 2nd ~Mirai~
- Released: August 19, 1998
- Recorded: 1998
- Genre: J-pop
- Length: 8:29
- Label: Amemura O-town Record
- Songwriter: Miho Komatsu
- Producer: ROCKAKU

Miho Komatsu singles chronology
"anybody's game" (1998)	"Chance" (1998)	"Kōri no ue ni Tatsu yō ni" (1998)

Chance (チャンス, Chansu) is the 5th single of the Japanese pop singer-songwriter Miho Komatsu. It was released on 19 August 1998 under Amemura O-town Record label.

== Background ==
According to unofficial sources, there were no plans to release single Chance at all. On air version of song started aired on Fuji TV in 1998, March. Compared to the original, officially released version it has slightly different key tuning and melody.

Five years later, in 2003 this song has received a new remix by Hiroshi Asai which was released in her 6th studio album Miho Komatsu 6th : Hanano under title Chance~Rechance~ (チャンス 〜RECHANCE〜).

The single reached #3 rank first week and sold 55,030 copies. It charted for seven weeks and totally sold 141,240 copies. This is her first and the only single which had highest rank in Oricon for first week of its release. The single has been awarded by RIAJ with a golden disk.

== Track listing ==
All songs are written and composed by Miho Komatsu and arranged by Hirohito Furui.

No.	Title	Length
1.	"Chance (チャンス)"	4:18
2.	"Chance (チャンス)" (original karaoke)	4:11

== Additional musicians ==
- Makoto Miyoshi - guitar
- Keiko Utoku - chorus

== Usage in media ==
- The single Chance was used for Fuji TV's morning breakfast program Mezamashi TV as a theme song
