= Nothin' but love =

Japanese pop

- Origin: Japan
- Genres: Pop
- Years active: 2000–2002
- Label: Giza Studio
- Members: Yuuya Kiritani; Yoshinobu Ohga
- Website: nothin' but love official site（WebArchived）

Nothin' but love was a Japanese pop unit under the Giza Studio label.

== History ==
In June 1999, Yoshinobu created a demo tape and, during music production, met with Yuuya in the studio. By June 2000, the band was formed.

In May 2001, they released their major debut single, Callin' you, with the B-side track including a cover of My Ever Changing Moods by The Style Council. On 30 June 2001, they participated in the Kansai Walker Matsuri 2001 Summer event, performing live covers of Cyndi Lauper's Time After Time and Earth, Wind & Fire's Fantasy. In November 2001, they released their second and final single, Tameiki ha Shiroku, Kimi wa Tooku. The promotional music video was used as an ending theme for the Tokyo Broadcasting System Television program, Rank Oukoku.

None of their singles reached the Oricon rankings successfully, and their sales were low. In December 2001, Callin' you was included in Giza Studio's compilation album, Giza Studio Masterpiece Blend 2001. In 2002, there were no activities, and the band disbanded without announcement, soon being removed from the list of official Giza Studio artists.

After disbanding, Yoshinobu formed his own Japanese rock band, OOM, with keyboardist U-zo Ohkusu. They were active between 2004 and 2009, and since 2012, both have been members of the instrumental band Sensation. Yuuya's presence was unknown until 2016, when fans spotted him using his real name, Ohmochi Hideyasu (大持秀康), with the indie band mo.chy/z as a vocalist and guitarist. On his YouTube channel, he has uploaded several cover videos with self-made arrangements.

== Musical style ==
=== Influence ===
- On their official website profile, they listed three artists who inspired them while producing music: The Style Council, Culture Club, Duran Duran.

== Members ==
- Yuuya Kiritani (桐谷悠也, Kiritani Yuuya) – vocals, lyricist
- Yoshinobu Ohga (大賀好修, Ōga Yoshinobu) – guitar, composer, arranger

== Discography ==
=== Singles ===
	Release Day	Title	Rank
1st	30/5/2001	Callin' you	–
2nd	23/11/2001	Tameiki wa Shiroku, Kimi wa Tooku (ため息は白く... 君は遠く...)	–

=== Compilation album ===
Release Day	Title	Album track	Rank
19/12/2001	Giza Studio Masterpiece Blend 2001	Disc2 #11 Callin' You	13

== Magazine appearances ==
From Music Freak Magazine:

- Vol.78 2002/5 (Callin' you interview)
- Vol.84 2002/11 (Tameiki wa Shiroku, Kimi wa Tooku interview)
- Vol.86 2002/1 (New Year Card message)
