= Koi ni Nare... =

Single by Miho Komatsu

from the album Miho Komatsu 8 ~a piece of cake~
- Released: December 7, 2005
- Recorded: 2005
- Genre: J-pop
- Length: 23 minutes
- Label: Giza Studio
- Songwriter: Miho Komatsu
- Producer: Miho Komatsu (Executive Producer : KANONJI ROCKAKU)

Miho Komatsu singles chronology
"Anata Iro" (2005)	"Koi ni Nare..." (2005)

"Koi ni Nare..." (恋になれ...; lit. "Falling in love with me") is the 26th and the last single by the Japanese pop singer and songwriter Miho Komatsu under Giza studio label. It was released on 7 December 2005. The single reached #39 in its first week and sold 4,258 copies. It charted for 2 weeks and sold 4,931 copies. The single has the lowest rank chart in Oricon in her career.

== Track listing ==
All songs are written and composed by Miho Komatsu

1. Koi ni Nare... (恋になれ...)
  - arrangement: Yoshinobu Ohga
  - it was used as an ending theme for the TBS show Tokoro Man Yuuki.
2. Koibitotachi No Christmas (恋人たちのchristmas)
  - Miho Komatsu / arrangement: Yoshinobu Ohga
3. Koi ni Nare... 〜Forest that ripples out〜 (恋になれ... 〜Forest that ripples out〜)
  - arrangement and remix: Hiroshi Asai (The Tambourines)
4. I just wanna hold you tight 〜a strange town Mix〜
  - arrangement and remix: Mr.Lee
  - remix of 24th single
5. Koi ni Nare... (恋になれ...) (instrumental)
