= Kōri no ue ni Tatsu yō ni =

Single by Miho Komatsu

from the album Miho Komatsu 2nd ~Mirai~
- Released: October 14, 1998
- Recorded: 1998
- Genre: J-pop
- Length: 18 minutes
- Label: Amemura O-town Record
- Songwriter(s): Miho Komatsu
- Producer(s): ROCKAKU

Miho Komatsu singles chronology
"Chance" (1998)	"Kōri no ue ni Tatsu yō ni" (1998)	"Sayonara no Kakera" (1999)

"Kōri no ue ni Tatsu yō ni" (氷の上に立つように, lit. "Like Standing on Ice") is the sixth single by Japanese pop singer Miho Komatsu, released under Amemura O-Town Record label.. It was released 14 October 1998. It reached #5 rank for first week and sold 54,760 copies. It charted for 14 weeks and totally sold 162,420 copies.

== Track listing ==
All songs are written and composed by Miho Komatsu and arranged by Hirohito Furui

1. "Kōri no ue ni Tatsu yō ni" (氷の上に立つように)
  - OA (on air) version, single and album version have different arrangements. OA version was never officially released in any CDs.
2. "One Side Love"
3. "Kōri no ue ni Tatsu yō ni" (氷の上に立つように) (instrumental)
4. "One Side Love" (instrumental)

== Usage in media ==
- Kōri no ue ni Tatsu yō ni
  - for Anime television series Case Closed (Detective Conan) as 6th ending theme
