= Kagayakeru Hoshi =

Single by Miho Komatsu

from the album Nazo?
- Released: September 25, 1997
- Recorded: 1997
- Genre: J-pop
- Length: 19 minutes
- Label: Amemura-O-Town Record
- Songwriter(s): Miho Komatsu
- Producer(s): ROCKAKU

Miho Komatsu singles chronology
"Nazo" (1997)	"Kagayakeru Hoshi" (1997)	"Negai Goto Hitotsu Dake" (1998)

Kagayakeru Hoshi (輝ける星, lit. "Shining Star") is the second single by Miho Komatsu and her first single released under the Amemura-O-Town Record label. The single reached #20 on the charts in its first week and sold 19,380 copies. It charted for five weeks total and sold 47,850 copies.

== Track listing ==
All lyrics are written by Miho Komatsu; all music is composed by Miho Komatsu

No.	Title	Arrangers	Length
1.	"Kagayakeru Hoshi" (輝ける星)	Hirohito Furui	4:26
2.	"Kizuato Wo Tadoreba" (傷あとをたどれば)	Hirohito Furui	5:01
3.	"Kagayakeru Hoshi" ((instrumental))	Hirohito Furui	4:26
4.	"Kizuato Wo Tadoreba" ((instrumental))	Hirohito Furui	5:01

== Usage in media ==
- Kagayakeru Hoshi
  - for anime television series Ninpen Manmaru as ending theme song
