= Aishiteru (Miho Komatsu song) =

"Aishiteru..."

Single by Miho Komatsu

from the album Miho Komatsu 5 ~source~
- Released: December 5, 2001
- Recorded: 2001
- Genre: J-pop
- Length: 25 minutes
- Label: Giza Studio
- Songwriter(s): Miho Komatsu
- Producer(s): Miho Komatsu (Executive Producer : KANONJI ROCKAKU)

Miho Komatsu singles chronology
"Saigo no Toride" (2001)	"Aishiteru..." (2001)	"dance" (2002)

Aishiteru (愛してる, lit. "I Love You") is the 15th single of the Japanese pop singer Miho Komatsu under Giza studio label. It was released 5 December 2001. The single reached #28 in its first week and sold 9,390 copies. It charted for 2 weeks and sold 11,860 copies.

== Track list ==
All songs are written and composed by Miho Komatsu and arranged by Yoshinobu Ohga

1. Aishiteru... (愛してる...)
2. Agaki (足掻き)
3. Aishiteru...〜inlaid with love mix〜 (愛してる... 〜inlaid with love mix〜)
  - remix: Yoshinobu Ohga
4. Aishiteru... (愛してる...) (instrumental)
5. Agaki (足掻き) (instrumental)
