= Nazo (album) =

Studio album by Miho Komatsu
- Released: 3 December 1997
- Recorded: 1997
- Genre: Japanese pop
- Length: 50:09
- Label: Amemura-O-Town
- Producer: ROCKAKU

Miho Komatsu chronology
Nazo (1997)	Miho Komatsu 2nd : Mirai (1998)

Singles from Nazo
- 1. "Nazo (song)" Released: 28 May 1997; 2. "Kagayakeru Hoshi" Released: 25 September 1997

Nazo (謎, lit. "Mystery") is the debut studio album by Japanese singer-songwriter Miho Komatsu. It was released on 3 December 1997 on Amemura-O-Town Record.

== Background ==
The album includes two previously released singles, Nazo and Kagayakeru Hoshi. Several of her songs were originally written for other bands: "Sabitsuita Machine Gun De Ima Wo Uchinukou" for Wands, "Aoi Sora Ni Deaeta" for Arisa Tsujio as the Chūka Ichiban! anime theme song, "Kono Machi De Kimi to Kurishitai" for Field of View, and "Kimi ga Inai Natsu" for Deen.

== Charting performance ==
The album reached number 5 in its first week, with 89,810 copies sold. The album charted for 40 weeks and it sold 400,000 copies altogether.

== Track listing ==
All songs were arranged by Masao Akashi (#1,#2,#7~#10) and Hirohito Furui (Garnet Crow) (#3~#6,#11)

Nazo (album)
No.	Title	Length
1.	"Dream'in Love"	4:28
2.	"Otogi Banashi" (おとぎ話)	4:06
3.	"Nazo" (謎)	4:37
4.	"Kizuato Wo Tadoreba" (傷あとをたどれば)	4:59
5.	"Kagayakeru Hoshi" (輝ける星)	4:24
6.	"alive"	4:26
7.	"Sabitsuita Machine Gun De Ima Wo Uchinukou" (錆びついたマシンガンで今を撃ち抜こう, song was originally performed by Wands)	3:46
8.	"Aoi Sora Ni Deaeta" (青い空に出逢えた, song was originally performed by Arisa Tsujio)	5:04
9.	"Kono Machi De Kimi to Kurishitai" (この街で君と暮らしたい, song was originally performed by Field of View)	4:44
10.	"Kimi ga Inai Natsu" (君がいない夏, song was originally performed by Deen)	4:42
11.	"MY SOUL"	4:56
Total length:		50:09

== Use in media ==
- Nazo was used as 3rd opening theme for Anime television series Detective Conan
- Kagayakeru Hoshi was used as ending theme for anime television series Ninpen Manmaru
- Dream'n Love was used as theme song for MBS radio's program Sport Dom
- Alive was used as image song for "Astel Kansai Corporation" CF
