= Sayonara no Kakera =

Single by Miho Komatsu

from the album Miho Komatsu 3rd ~ everywhere ~
- Released: March 3, 1999
- Recorded: 1998・1999
- Genre: J-pop
- Length: 18 minutes
- Label: Amemura-O-Town Record
- Songwriter(s): Miho Komatsu
- Producer(s): Miho Komatsu (Executive Producer : ROCKAKU)

Miho Komatsu singles chronology
"Kōri no ue ni Tatsu yō ni" (1998)	"Sayonara no Kakera" (1999)	"Saitan Kyori de" (1999)

"Sayonara no Kakera" (さよならのかけら, lit. "Fragments of goodbye") is the seventh single by the Japanese singer Miho Komatsu, and the last single released under the Amemura-O-Town Record label. It's her first maxi-single. Originally it was supposed to be released as 8 cm single, but the plan has changed. The single reached #17 first week and sold 37,980 copies. It charted for four weeks and totally sold 58,540 copies.

== Track listing ==
All songs are written and composed by Miho Komatsu and arranged by Hirohito Furui

1. "Sayonara no Kakera" (さよならのかけら)
  - the song was used as the ending theme for the TV Asahi show Paku2 Gurumenbo.
2. "BOY FRIEND"
3. "Sayonara no Kakera" (さよならのかけら) (instrumental)
4. "BOY FRIEND" (instrumental)

== Usage in media ==
- Sayonara no Kakera
  - for TV Asahi show Paku2 Gurumenbo as ending theme
