= Tsubasa wa Nakutemo =

Single by Miho Komatsu

from the album Miho Komatsu 7 ~prime number~
- Released: November 26, 2003
- Genre: J-pop
- Length: 20 minutes
- Label: Giza Studio
- Songwriter: Miho Komatsu
- Producer: Miho Komatsu (Executive Producer : KANONJI ROCKAKU)

Miho Komatsu singles chronology
"Watashi Sagashi" (2003)	"Tsubasa wa Nakutemo" (2003)	"Namida Kirari Tobase" (2004)

Tsubasa wa Nakutemo (翼はなくても; lit. Even without wings) is a single by Japanese pop singer and songwriter Miho Komatsu released under Giza studio label. It was released 26 November 2003. The single reached #30 in its first week and sold 5,642 copies. It charted for 3 weeks and sold 6,278 copies in total.

== Track list ==
All songs are written and composed by Miho Komatsu with except in track No.3 (assistance)

1. "Tsubasa wa Nakutemo" (翼はなくても)
  - arrangement: Hirohito Furui (Garnet Crow)
2. "I'll tell you"
  - arrangement: Hitoshi Okamoto (Garnet Crow)
3. "Toori Sora de" (遠い空で)
  - lyrics: Kazuo Yoshie / arrangement: Daisuke Ikeda
  - DEEN's "Tooi Sora de"(遠い空で) self-cover
4. "Tsubasa wa Nakutemo" (翼はなくても) (instrumental)
