= I Just Wanna Hold You Tight =

"I just wanna hold you tight"

Single by Miho Komatsu

from the album Miho Komatsu 8 ~a piece of cake~
- Released: May 18, 2005
- Recorded: 2005
- Genre: J-pop
- Length: 17 minutes
- Label: Giza Studio
- Songwriter: Miho Komatsu
- Producer: Miho Komatsu (Executive Producer: KANONJI ROCKAKU)

Miho Komatsu singles chronology
"I~Dareka..." (2004)	"I just wanna hold you tight" (2005)	"Anata Iro" (2005)

I just wanna hold you tight is the 24th single of the Japanese pop singer and songwriter Miho Komatsu released under Giza studio label. It was released 18 May 2005. The single reached #36 and sold 5,294 copies. It is charted for 3 weeks and, in total, sold 6,932 copies.

== Track listing ==
All songs are written and composed by Miho Komatsu

1. "I just wanna hold you tight"
  - arrangement: Satoru Kobayashi
  - it is used as an ending song for the TV Tokyo anime series MÄR.
2. "Sugu Koi Nante Dekiru" (すぐ恋なんて出来る)
  - arrangement: Yoshinobu Ohga
3. "Aoi Natsu" (蒼い夏)
  - arrangement: Hirohito Furui (Garnet Crow)
4. "I just wanna hold you tight" (instrumental)
