= Saitan Kyori de =

"Saitan kyori de"

Single by Miho Komatsu

from the album Miho Komatsu 3rd ~ everywhere ~
- Released: May 8, 1999
- Recorded: 1999
- Genre: J-pop
- Length: 18 minutes
- Label: Giza Studio
- Songwriter(s): Miho Komatsu
- Producer(s): ROCKAKU

Miho Komatsu singles chronology
"Sayonara no Kakera" (1999)	"Saitan kyori de" (1999)	"Kaze ga Soyogu Basho" (1999)

"Saitan kyori de" (最短距離で, lit. "Shortest distance") is a single by Japanese singer Miho Komatsu and her first single released under the Giza Studio label. Unlike her previous single which was released as maxi-single, this one was released in 8cm single format. The single reached #16 for the first time and sold 21,130 copies. It charted for three weeks and sold 37,140 copies.

== Track listing ==
All songs are written and composed by Miho Komatsu and arranged by Hirohito Furui

1. "Saitan kyori de" (最短距離で)
  - it is used as an ending song for the TBS show Rank Oukoku.
  - single version and album version have different arrangements
2. "My destination..."
3. "Saitan kyori de" (最短距離で) (instrumental)
4. "My destination..." (instrumental)
