= Iryo Sosei University =

Private university in Iwaki, Fukushima, Japan

Coordinates: 37°1′7.5″N 140°55′0.7″E

- 医療創生大学
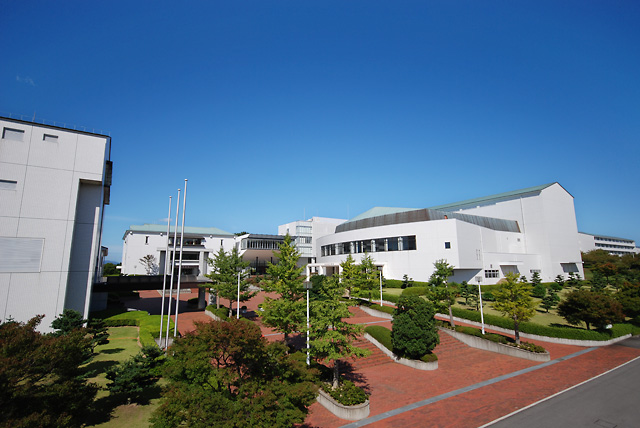
- Type: Private
- Established: 1987
- Location: Iwaki, Fukushima, Japan
- Website: https://www.isu.ac.jp/

Iryo Sosei University (医療創生大学, Iryō Sōsei Daigaku) is a private university, located in the city of Iwaki, Fukushima, Japan.

== History ==
Iwaki Meisei University was established in 1987 with an undergraduate School of Science and Technology and School of Humanities. A graduate (master's) program was initiated from 1992, and a doctoral program from 1994. A School of Pharmacy was established in 2007. In 2019, Iwaki Meisei University was renamed to Iryo Sosei University.

== Faculties ==
=== Undergraduate ===
- School of Science and Technology
- School of Humanities
- School of Pharmacy

=== Graduate ===
- Graduate School of Science and Technology
- Graduate School of Humanities
