= Todomaru Koto no nai Ai =

Single by Miho Komatsu

from the album Miho Komatsu 5 ~source~
- Released: May 30, 2001
- Recorded: 2001
- Genre: J-pop
- Length: 20 minutes
- Label: Giza Studio
- Songwriter: Miho Komatsu
- Producer: Miho Komatsu (Executive Producer : KANONJI ROCKAKU)

Miho Komatsu singles chronology
"Love Gone" (2001)	"Todomaru Koto no nai Ai" (2001)	"Saigo no Toride" (2001)

Todomaru Koto no nai Ai (とどまることのない愛; lit. "A love that never stops) is Miho Komatsu 13th single released under Giza Studio label. It was released 30 May 2001. The single reached #22 for its first week and sold 12,780 copies. It charted for 2 weeks and, in total, sold 16,110 copies.

== Track listing ==
All songs are written and composed by Miho Komatsu and arranged by Yoshinobu Ohga

1. Todomaru Koto no nai Ai (とどまることのない愛)
2. glass
3. NAKED
4. Todomaru Koto no nai Ai (とどまることのない愛) (instrumental)
