= Dance (Miho Komatsu song) =

"dance"

Single by Miho Komatsu

from the album Miho Komatsu 5 ~source~
- Released: May 29, 2002
- Recorded: 2002
- Genre: J-pop
- Length: 24 minutes
- Label: Giza Studio
- Songwriter(s): Miho Komatsu
- Producer(s): Miho Komatsu (Executive Producer : KANONJI ROCKAKU)

Miho Komatsu singles chronology
"Aishiteru..." (2001)	"dance" (2002)	"mysterious love" (2002)

"dance" is the 16th single by the Japanese pop singer Miho Komatsu released under the Giza Studio label. It was released 29 May 2002. The single was released on the 5th anniversary of her debut. The single reached #28 in its first week and sold 8,830 copies. It charted for 2 weeks and sold 10,860 copies.

== Track listing ==
All songs are written and composed by Miho Komatsu and arranged by Yoshinobu Ohga

1. "dance"
  - the song was used as an ending song for NTV show CW Love
2. "Bokura no Yukue" (僕らの行方)
3. "dance" <KENNY'S CLASSIC CLUB MIX>
  - remix: KENNY (ORIENTA-RHYTHM) for BASEMENT FACTORY PRODUCTIONS
4. "dance" (instrumental)
5. "Bokura no Yukue" (僕らの行方) (instrumental)
