= Giza Studio R&B Respect Vol.1: Six Sisters Selection =

Compilation album by Various artists
- Released: December 5, 2001
- Recorded: 2000–2001
- Genre: R&B
- Length: 24:05
- Label: Giza Studio
- Producer: Daikō Nagato

Giza Studio compilation album chronology
Giza Studio R&B Respect Vol.1: Six Sisters Selection (2001)	Giza Studio Masterpiece Blend 2001 (2001)

Giza Studio R&B Respect Vol.1: Six Sisters Selection is a cover compilation album produced by Daiko Nagato. It was released on 5 December 2001 under the Giza Studio label.

== Background ==
The album features six R&B cover songs which are covered by six young artist at that time from Giza Studio album. The official website includes liner notes and comments from each artist.

On 15 December 2001, all six singers performed cover songs in live house Hills Pan Kōjō in Osaka. The live footage has been released in DVD Giza Studio R&B Party at the “Hills Pan Koujou on 14 February 2002.

Some fans were dissatisfied because of low track list numbers and wished each artist recorded two cover tracks.

== Chart performance ==
The album debuted at number 20 on the Oricon Weekly Albums Chart.

== Track listing ==
Disc 1
No.	Title	Original Performer	Length
1.	"Free" (by Akiko Matsuda (Ramjet Pulley))	Deniece Williams	4:26
2.	"Tell Me" (by Yuri Nakamura (Garnet Crow))	Groove Theory	3:51
3.	"I'll be there" (by Mai Kuraki)	The Jackson 5	4:17
4.	"You Can't Hurry Love" (by Ami Matsunaga The Tambourines)	Supremes	4:09
5.	"Killing Me Softly With His Song)" (by Mami Miyoshi (Rumania Montevideo))	Roberta Flack	3:54
6.	"I Will Survive" (by Rina Aiuchi)	Gloria Gaynor	4:21

== Personnel ==
Credits adapted from album booklet.

- Satoru Kobayashi - arrange (1)
- Perry Geyer - arrange (2)
- DJ-MEYA & Dr.Terachi - arrange (3)
- Hirohito Furui (Garnet Crow) - arrange (4)
- Akihito Tokunaga - arrange (5)
- Midori Miwa - arrange (6)
- Kazunobu Mashima - backing vocals (1)
- Erica Haupt - keyboard (2)
- Jeffrey Qwest - backing vocals (2,4,5)
- Ryoichi Terashima - electric guitar (3)
- Fusanosuke Kondou - backing vocals (3)
- David C.Brown - backing vocals (3)
- Maho Furukawa (4D-JAM) - backing vocals (4)
- Makoto Miyoshi (Rumania Montevideo) - guitar (5,6)
- Satin Doll - backing vocals (5)
- Keiko Utoku - backing vocals (6)
- Terukado - backing vocals (6)
