= Hirohito Furui =

Japanese arranger & keyboardist (born 1967)

Hirohito Furui 古井 弘人
- Born: February 7, 1967 (age 59); Japan
- Genres: Japanese pop, Rock
- Occupations: Music arranger and Keyboardist
- Years active: 1993–present
- Label: Giza Studio
- Website: http://garnetcrow.com/

Hirohito Furui (古井 弘人, Furui Hirohito) is a Japanese musical arranger and keyboardist in distributors Being Inc., mainly in their label Giza Studio. In years 1999-2013 he was part of Japanese band Garnet Crow as arranger. In March 2018, he launched his own band project Again, however in June 2019 changed into Alpha under independent label Freestyle.

== List of provided works as arranger ==
★ album ☆ single/coupling

=== Miho Komatsu ===
- Nazo ☆
- Kagayakeru Hoshi ☆
- Alive, My Soul (Nazo) ★
- Negai Goto Hitotsu Dake ☆
- Koori no ue ni Tatsu yo ni ☆
- Chance ☆
- Anybody's Game ☆
- Miho Komatsu 2nd ~ Mirai ~ ★
- Sayonara no Kakera ☆
- Saitan Kyori de ☆
- Kaze ga Soyogu Basho ☆
- No Time No Fall, Holding; Holding on (Miho Komatsu 3rd ~ everywhere ~) ★
- Style of my own (Miho Komatsu 5 ~ source ~) ★
- Ashita wo Motezuni (Miho Komatsu 6th ~ Hanano ~) ★
- Tsubasa wa Nakutemo ☆
- Suna no Shiro ☆
- Namida Kirare Tobase ☆
- I~Dareka... ☆
- Kokyou (Miho Komatsu 7 ~prime number~) ★
- Anata Iro ☆
- Aoi Natsu, Anata no Te (Miho Komatsu 8 ~a piece of cake~)★
- Happy ending (Miho Komatsu Best ~once more~) ★

=== Zard ===
- I can't let go
- Atarashii Door ~Fuyu no Himawari~ ☆
- Wake Up Make The Morning Last ~Wasuregataki Hito he~, I Feel Fine Yeah (Eien) ★
- Mind Games ☆
- Sekai wa Kitto Mirai no Naka ☆
- Kono Namida Hoshi ni Nare ☆
- Omohide (Toki no Tsubasa) ★
- Separate Ways (Kimi to no Distance) ★

=== Deen ===
- Koi ga Totsuzen Yomigaeru, Eien wo Azuketekure, Keep On Dancin' (as composer) (Deen) ★
- Hitori ja Nai ☆
- Sunshine On Summer Time ☆
- Kimi no Kokoro ni Kaeritai, Shounen (I wish)
- Mirai no Tameni ☆
- Tooi Toori Mirai de ☆
- Tooi ni Yuku yo (The Day) ★
- Mou Nakanaide ☆
- Kioku no Kage ☆
- Kimi he no Parade ☆
- Kizuna (Parade) ★

=== Manish ===
- It's so Natural ☆
- Iranai, Kaze, Setsunai Jiyuu, Kimagurena Sora, Sayonara Lazy Days, Mabushii Kurai ni (Cheer!) ★

=== Keiko Utoku ===
- Wooo Baby ☆

=== Arisa Tsujio ===
- Aoi Sora ni Deata ☆
- Natsu no Nioi ☆

=== Rumania Montevideo ===
(along with Makoto Miyoshi)

- Jet Plane ★
- Sunny,Cloudy,Rain ★
- Still for your love ☆
- Rumaniamania ★
- Digital Music Power ☆
- Picnic ☆
- Koisuru Betty ☆
- Girl, Girl, Boy, Girl, Boy ★
- Start All Over Again ☆
- Hard Rain ☆
- Tender Rain ☆
- Mo' Better Tracks ★

=== Grass Arcade ===
- Brave ☆
- Butterfly ☆

=== Sweet Velvet ===
- I Just Feel So Love Again ☆
- Flame of love ☆
- Lazy Drive ☆
- Stay (I Just Feel So "Sweet") ★

=== WAG ===
- Free Magic ☆

=== Mai Kuraki ===
- What I feel

=== Chika Yoshida ===
- Danna san he -Higoro no Kansha wo Komete- ★ (Yoshida Chika -12 no Hana-)
- Tsuki ni Inori wo ☆

=== The Tambourines ===
- Easy Game ☆
- Yesterday is over ☆
- Mayonaka ni Kizuita Funny Love ☆
- Hijack brandnew days ☆
- Call me, call me ☆
- Love Flower, Star, My back pages (My Back Pages) ★
- Flash back (Dizzy Season) ★
- Blue blue rain ☆

=== Shiori Takei ===
- Atarashii Kisetsu (My Favorite Things) ★
- Puzzle (Second tune ~Sekai Tomete~) ★

=== Rina Aiuchi ===
- Miss you (Playgirl)★
- Natsu no Maboroshi (Thanx)★
- Hands ☆

=== Sayuri Iwata ===
- Sorairo no Neko ☆

=== Miki Matsuhashi ===
- Secret Place, Peaceful night (Destiny) ★

=== Azumi Uehara ===
- Solitude ☆

=== Aiko Kitahara ===
- Hands up!! (Message) ★
- Mou Kokoro Yuretarishinaide ☆
- Sono Egayo yo Eien ni ☆
- Koi no Inryoku ☆

=== Marie Ueda ===
- Senkai Jumon (Sentimental Rhythm) ★

=== Renka ===
- Rebirth ☆
- Melody of Memory ☆

=== Ai Takaoka ===
- You Gone ☆

=== U-ka Saegusa in db ===
- Kimi no Ai ni Tsutsumarete Itai ☆
- Ai no Wana ☆
- Everybody Jump ☆
- Fall in love ☆
- Natsu no Photograph, Ai Kotoba (U-ka saegusa IN db III) ★

== Discography ==
- Imagination (digital release)

== See also ==
- Garnet Crow discography
