= Girl, Girl, Boy, Girl, Boy =

Girl,girl,boy,girl,boy

Studio album by Rumania Montevideo
- Released: January 26, 2000
- Recorded: 1999–2000
- Genre: J-pop; rock; country
- Length: 51:57
- Label: Giza
- Producer: Makoto Miyoshi; Rockaku

Rumania Montevideo chronology
Rumaniamania (1999)	Girl,girl,boy,girl,boy (2000)	Mo' Better Tracks (2002)

Singles from Girl, Girl, Boy, Girl, Boy
- 1. "Digital Music Power" Released: 15 September 1999; 2. "picnic" Released: 3 November 1999; 3. "Koisuru Betty" Released: 10 January 2000

Girl, Girl, Boy, Girl, Boy is the second studio album by Japanese J-pop band Rumania Montevideo. It was released on January 26, 2000, by Giza Studio.

== Background ==
The title of the album represents the members of the band - three "girls" (Mami, Akiko, Satomi) and two "boys" (Makoto, Kazunobu).

The album consist of three previously released singles, such as Digital Music Power, Picnic and Koisuru Betty (恋するベティー). Koisuru Betty was released two weeks before the album.

B-side track Under the Skin from second single was included in this album as well.

Digital Music Power and Picnic were re-recorded from the original songs Snap and picnic which were performed in English and included in their first and second indies albums Jet Plane and Sunny, Cloudy, Rain.

== Charting ==
The album reached #24 on Oricon in its first week and sold 13,410 copies. It charted for 2 weeks and sold 17,490 copies.

== Track listing ==
All lyrics are written by Mami Miyoshi; all music is composed by Makoto Miyoshi

No.	Title	Length
1.	"Dare mo Shiranai Yoake (誰も知らない夜明け)"	4:13
2.	"Koisuru Betty (恋するベティー)"	4:28
3.	"Picnic" (renewed version of "picnic" from the 1st indies album "Jet Plane")	3:45
4.	"Digital Music Power (デジタルミュージックパワー)" (renewed version of "Snap" from 2nd indies album "Sunny,Cloudy,Rain")	4:03
5.	"Mou Modorenai (もう戻れない)"	4:22
6.	"6 AM"	3:32
7.	"Girl, Girl, Boy, Girl, Boy"	2:39
8.	"Under the Skin"	4:28
9.	"Jidousha de Daseru dake no Speed Kaze Sae mo Oikoshita Kigashita (自転車で出せるだけのスピード 風さえも追い越した気がした)"	4:09
10.	"Hoshi (星)"	3:02
11.	"ACDC"	3:44
12.	"Boku wo Matsu Kimi he (僕を待つ君へ)"	5:09
13.	"132 + 126"	4:23

== Personnel ==
Credits adapted from the CD booklet of Girl, Girl, Boy, Girl, Boy.

- Mami Miyoshi – vocals, songwriting, drums
- Makoto Miyoshi - producer, guitar, arranging, composing
- Satomi Makoshi - bass, backing vocals
- Akiko Matsuda - keyboards, backing vocals
- Kazunobu Mashima - guitar
- Yoshinori Akai - recording, mixing, manipulating
- Tatsuya Okada - assistant engineering
- Secil Minami - backing vocals
- Hirohito Furui (Garnet Crow) - keyboard, arranging
- Keisuke Kurumatani (New Cinema Tokage) - drums
- Aika Ohno – backing vocals
- Nobuyasu Hirohara: organ
- Maho Furukawa (4D-JAM): backing vocals
- Takumi Ito: backing vocals
- Gan Kojima – art direction
- Rockaku - producing

== In media ==
- Digital Music Power: ending theme for Anime television series Monster Rancher
- Picnic: opening theme for Anime television series Monster Rancher
- Koisuru Betty: streaming song for older corners of Tokyo Broadcasting System Television program Express
