= Giza Studio Masterpiece Blend 2003 =

Greatest hits album by Various artists
- Released: December 17, 2003
- Genre: J-pop; Anime song; R&B
- Length: 114:20
- Label: Giza Studio
- Producer: Daikō Nagato

Various artists chronology
| Giza Studio Masterpiece Blend 2002 (2002) | Giza Studio; Masterpiece Blend 2003 (2003) |

Giza Studio Masterpiece Blend 2003 is the third greatest hits album by Giza Studio recording label. It is the final album from the compilation series annual releases. It was released on 17 December 2003. The album features a list of songs from voting inquiry by listeners.

Giza Studio Masterpiece Blend 2004 was scheduled to be released but was canceled.

== Charts ==
The album debuted at No. 33 on the Oricon Weekly Albums Chart, selling more than 17,000 copies in its first week.

== Track listing ==
Disc 1
| No. | Title | Lyrics | Music | Arranger(s) | Length |
|---|---|---|---|---|---|
| 1. | "Kiss (Mai Kuraki)" | Mai Kuraki | YOKO Black. Stone | Cybersound | 4:35 |
| 2. | "Infinity (Rina Aiuchi)" | Aiuchi | Terukado | corin. | 5:04 |
| 3. | "Nakenai Yoru mo Nakanai Asa mo (Garnet Crow)" (泣けない夜も 泣かない朝も) | Azuki Nana | Yuri Nakamura | Hirohito Furui | 4:18 |
| 4. | "Watashi Sagashi (Miho Komatsu)" | Komatsu | Miho Komatsu | Akihito Tokunaga | 5:20 |
| 5. | "Graduation (in dB)" | Yuka Saegusa | Yuri Nakamura (Garnet Crow) | Tokunaga | 4:21 |
| 6. | "Don't you wanna see me oh tonight?" | Shizukusa | Tokunaga | Tokunaga | 4:01 |
| 7. | "MeiQ!?-Meikyuu Make You- (Hayami Kishimoto)" (迷Q!?-迷宮-MAKE★YOU-) | Azuki Nana | Aika Ohno | Kūron Oshiro | 4:09 |
| 8. | "Afresh Wish (The★tambourines)" | Ami Matsunaga | Tokunaga | Tokunaga | 4:14 |
| 9. | "Koigokoro (Akane Sugazaki)" | Sugazaki | Ohno | Satoru Kobayashi | 3:54 |
| 10. | "Fight Song (WAG)" | WAG | WAG | WAG |
| 11. | "Special Days! (Aiko Kitahara)" | Kitahara | Masazumi Ozawa | Ozawa | 4:28 |
| 12. | "I'll fall in love again (Ramjet Pulley)" | Satomi Makoshi | Kazunobu Yashima | Kobayashi; Ramjet Pulley | 5:19 |
| 13. | "FULL JUMP: All That Jazz mix〜 (Rina Aiuchi)" | Aiuchi | Terukado | Dr.Terachi&Pierrot le fou |

Disc 2
| No. | Title | Lyrics | Music | Arranger(s) | Length |
|---|---|---|---|---|---|
| 1. | "Shocking Blue (in dB)" | Yuka Saegusa | Aika Ohno | Masazumi Ozawa | 4:04 |
| 2. | "Over Shine (Rina Aiuchi" | Aiuchi | Akihito Tokunaga | Terukado | 4:20 |
| 3. | "Eien wo Kakenukeru Isshun no Bokura（GARNET CROW）" (永遠を駆け抜ける一瞬の僕ら) | Azuki Nana | Yuri Nakamura | Hirohito Furui; Miguel Sá Pessoa | 4:15 |
| 4. | "If I Believe (Mai Kuraki)" | Kuraki | Ohno | Cybersound | 3:43 |
| 5. | "Futari no Negai (Miho Komatsu)" | Komatsu | Komatsu | Satoru Kobayashi | 3:41 |
| 6. | "everything is nothing(The★tambourines)" | Ami Matsunaga | Terukado | Kobayashi | 4:43 |
| 7. | "Take Me Take Me (Yumi Shizukusa" | Shizukusa | Tokunaga | Tokunaga | 4:21 |
| 8. | "Hoshi ni Negai wo: I wish upon a star (Akane Sugazaki)" (星に願いを) | Sugazaki | Keiko Masuda | Kūron Oshiro | 5:01 |
| 9. | "Aisuru Kibi ga Soba ni Ireba (Hayami Kishimoto)" (愛する君が傍にいれば) | Azuki Nana | Ohno | Oshiro | 4:14 |
| 10. | "Jinsei Game (Azumi Uehara)" (人生ゲーム) | Uehara | Makoto Miyoshi | Oshiro | 5:05 |
| 11. | "Natsu no Koibito (Shiori Takei)" (夏の恋人) | Yamashita | Tatsuro Yamashita | Hideyuki Terachu; Pierrot le fou | 3:52 |
| 12. | "Give up the Funk (Tear the Rood of the Sucker) (Experience)" |
| 13. | "Don't Say Don't Love (Yumi Shizukusa)" | Shizukusa | YOKO Black. Stone | Black. Stone |
