= Giza Studio Masterpiece Blend 2001 =

Greatest hits album by Various artists
- Released: December 19, 2001
- Genre: J-pop; Anime song; R&B
- Length: 108:35
- Label: Giza Studio
- Producer: Daikō Nagato

Various artists chronology
Giza Studio; Masterpiece Blend 2001 (2001)	Giza Studio Masterpiece Blend 2002 (2002)

Giza Studio Masterpiece Blend 2001 is the first greatest hits album by Giza Studio recording label. It was released on 19 December 2001. The album features a list of songs from voting inquiry by listeners.

== Charts ==
The album debuted at No. 13 on the Oricon Weekly Albums Chart, selling more than 100,000 copies in its first week of release.

== Track listing ==
Disc 1
No.	Title	Lyrics	Music	Arranger(s)	Length
1.	"Always (Mai Kuraki)"	Mai Kuraki	Aika Ohno	Cybersound	4:08
2.	"Call my name (Garnet Crow)"	Azuki Nana	Yuri Nakamura	Hirohito Furui	4:52
3.	"Overjoyed (Ramjet Pulley)"	Satomi Makoshi	Kazunobu Mashima	Satoru Kobayashi	4:52
4.	"Navy Blue (Rina Aiuchi)"	Rina Aiuchi	Daria Kawashima	Midori Miwa	4:20
5.	"Aoi Aoi Kono Hoshi (Azumi Uehara)" (青い青いこの地球に)	Azumi Uehara/Nana	Ohno	Kūron Oshiro	3:50
6.	"Easy Game (The Tambourines)"	Ami Matsunaga	Ohno	Furui	3:45
7.	"Hard Rain (Rumania Montevideo)"	Mami Miyoshi	Makoto Miyoshi	Makoto Miyoshi, Furui	4:24
8.	"Big Good Lovin' (4D-JAM)"	Maho Furukawa	Kenji Shiojiri	4D-JAM	5:00
9.	"Safety Love (Soul Crusaders)"	Nana	Ohno	Hiroshi Terao	4:18
10.	"Ai no Sanka (Les Mauvais Garçonnes)" (愛の讃歌)	Édith Piaf (Japanese translation: Tokiko Iwatani)	Marguerite Monnot	Sakae Yamaguchi	2:39
11.	"Destiny (Miki Matsuhashi)"	Makoshi	Mashima	Toshiya Shimizu	4:15
12.	"Love Gone (Miho Komatsu)"	Komatsu	Komatsu	Yoshinobu Ohga	4:12

Disc 2
No.	Title	Lyrics	Music	Arranger(s)	Length
1.	"Todomaru Koto no nai Ai (Miho Komatsu)"	Komatsu	Komatsu	Yoshinobu Ohga	5:09
2.	"Mizu no nai Hareta Umi he (Garnet Crow)"	Azuki Nana	Yuri Nakamura	Hirohito Furui	4:38
3.	"Stand Up (Mai Kuraki)"	Kuraki	Akihito Tokunaga	Tokunaga	4:30
4.	"Final Way (Ramjet Pulley)"	Satomi Makoshi	Kazunobu Mashima	Satoru Kobayashi	3:04
5.	"Run Up (Rina Aiuchi)"	Aiuchi	Aika Ohno	Midori Miwa	5:23
6.	"Tsuki ni Inori wo (Chika Yoshida)" (月に祈りを)	Yoshida	Makoto Miyoshi	Furui	3:51
7.	"Kiss (Mika Hase)"	Hase	Seiichirou Iwai	Iwai	4:15
8.	"Kanashimi no Ame (Wag)" (悲しみの雨)	Nana, Shinya Hirayama	Tokunaga	Tokunaga	4:15
9.	"Lovely Generation〜goes&fights〜 (New Cinema Tokage)"	Motoaki Funaki	Iwai	New Cinema Tokage	4:16
10.	"Sweet×2 Summer Rain (Hitoshi Okamoto)"	Nana	Okamoto	Okamoto	3:09
11.	"Callin' You (Nothin' but love)"	Yuuya Kiritani	Ohga	Ohga	4:34
12.	"Brain Wash (JASON ZODIAC)"	Naotoaki Kondo	Perrye Geyer	Geyer	4:39
13.	"C'mon, C'mon 〜Groove That Soul Mix〜"	Kuraki	Tokunaga	COOL CITY PRODUCTION	7:30
