= Mo' Better Tracks =

Studio album by Rumania Montevideo
- Released: February 6, 2002
- Recorded: 2000–2002
- Genre: Rock
- Length: 43:28
- Label: Giza
- Producer: Makoto Miyoshi; Kanonji

Rumania Montevideo chronology
Girl, Girl, Boy, Girl, Boy (2000)	Mo' Better Tracks (2002)

Singles from Mo' Better Tracks
- 1. "Start All Over Again" Released: 23 August 2000; 2. "Hard rain" Released: 25 April 2001; 3. "Tender Rain" Released: 12 December 2001

Mo' Better Tracks is the third and final studio album by Japanese J-pop band Rumania Montevideo. It was released on February 6, 2002, by Giza Studio.

== Background ==
The actual meaning of the title is "More Better Tracks".

Compared to their previous studio albums, the music style has distanced from typical country and J-pop style and aimed for rock style.

Three out of twelve tracks contain the word "Rain".

The album consists of three previously released singles: "Start All Over Again", "Hard Rain" and "Tender Rain".

"Start All Over Again" and its b-side track "My Life" from single has received completely new recording under title album version.

B-side track "Taxi" from "Tender Rain" was included in this album as well.

The sixth single "Hard Rain" was included in the compilation album Giza Studio Masterpiece Blend 2001.

On their official website was launched page with a short preview videos with the short commentaries and self liner notes by vocalist and drummer Mami.

Soon after its release, the band went into unannounced indefinite hiatus.

== Charting ==
The album reached #49 rank in Oricon on its first week. It charted only 1 week and sold 4,700 copies.

== Track listing ==
All lyrics are written by Mami Miyoshi; all music is composed by Makoto Miyoshi.

No.	Title	Length
1.	"I'll Be With You"	3:49
2.	"Hard Rain"	4:26
3.	"Free"	2:47
4.	"Tender Rain"	5:00
5.	"Rain"	3:27
6.	"Sleeper"	1:24
7.	"Life Style"	4:22
8.	"Taxi"	2:51
9.	"Take My Pain Away"	3:37
10.	"My Life" (album version)	3:23
11.	"All By Myself"	3:35
12.	"Start all Over Again" (album version)	4:47

== Personnel ==
Credits adapted from the CD booklet of Mo' Better Tracks.

- Mami Miyoshi – vocals, songwriting, drums
- Makoto Miyoshi - producer, guitar, arranging, composing
- Satomi Makoshi - bass
- Akiko Matsuda - keyboards, backing vocals
- Kazunobu Mashima - guitar, backing vocals
- Secil Minami - backing vocals
- Aika Ohno – backing vocals
- Ryo Tachihara - backing vocals
- Maho Furukawa (4D-JAM) - backing vocals
- Mika&Rika (mist a sista) - backing vocals
- Keisuke Kurumatani (New Cinema Tokage) - drums
- Akira Onozuka (Dimension)- piano
- Hirohito Furui (Garnet Crow) - keyboard, sound designing
- Satoru Kobayashi - keyboard
- Yoshinori Akai - recording, mixing, manipulating
- Akio Nakajima - mixing
- Takayuki Ichikawa - mixing
- Taku Oyabu - recording, mixing,
- Katsuki Yoshimatsu - recording
- Tatsuya Okada - recording
- Yousuke Nishimura - assistant engineering
- Masahiro Shimada - mastering
- Gan Kojima – art direction
- Kanonji - producing

== In media ==
- Start All Over Again: ending theme for TV Asahi program Mokugeki Dokyun!
- Hard Rain: ending theme for Tokyo Broadcasting System Television program Kinniku Banzuke
- Tender Rain: ending theme for Tokyo Broadcasting System Television program CDTV
