= I Just Feel So "Sweet" =

Studio album by Sweet Velvet
- Released: February 28, 2000
- Recorded: 1998–2000
- Studios: Red Way Studio; Blue way Studio; Birdman River studio Heart Beat Studio
- Genre: J-pop
- Length: 42:13
- Label: Giza Studio
- Producer: Daiko Nagato

Sweet Velvet chronology
Sweet Velvet (1999)	I Just Feel So "Sweet" (2000)

Singles from I Just Feel So "Sweet"
- 1. "I Just Feel So Love Again ~Soba ni Iru dake de~" Released: February 10, 1999; 2. "Flame Of Love" Released: June 23, 1999; 3. "Lazy Drive" Released: August 25, 1999

I Just Feel So "Sweet" is the first and only studio album by Japanese pop band Sweet Velvet. It was released on February 26, 2000, through Giza Studio.

== Background ==
The album consists of three previous released singles, such as "I Just Feel So Love Again ~Soba ni Iru dake de~" (I JUST FEEL SO LOVE AGAIN 〜そばにいるだけで〜), "Flame Of Love" and "Lazy Drive".

Three tracks out of ten: "So good", "Sweeter Baby" and "Fairplay" were reprised from indies album "Sweet Velvet". Fairplay has subtitle -album mix- and it shares significant melody change.

Most of the tracks were previously released as b-side of their singles, with exception of Un jour, Blue and Drive and Over which were recorded newly for this album.

Two tracks out of ten were composed by band themselves while seven tracks out of ten were composed by Japanese composer Aika Ohno.

After the album release, the band has disbanded without official announcement and later their website was removed by director of Giza Studio as well.

== Charting ==
The album charted at #100 on the Oricon charts in its first week. It charted for 1 week and sold 2,900 copies.

== Track listing ==
All lyrics are written by Mizuki Akimoto.

No.	Title	Music	Arrangers	Length
1.	"un jour" (instrumental)	Naoyuki Tsukada	sweet velvet	0:53
2.	"I Just Feel So Love Again -Soba ni Iru dake de-" (～そばにいるだけで～)	Aika Ohno	Hirohito Furui (Garnet Crow)	4:37
3.	"Blue Drive"	Ohno	Kuuron Oshiro	5:13
4.	"Lazy Drive"	Ohno	Furui	4:57
5.	"Sweeter Baby"	Ohno	Yasuharu Konishi	4:28
6.	"Fairplay" (album mix)	Ohno	Oshiro	4:47
7.	"So good"	Ohno	Ryou Kamomiya	3:11
8.	"Stay"	Nami Kaneko	Furui	4:57
9.	"Flame Of Love"	Ohno	Furui	4:06
10.	"Over"	Tsukada	Oshiro	5:12
Total length:				42:13

== Personnel ==
Credits adapted from the CD booklet of I Just Feel So "Sweet".

- Mizuki Akimoto - vocalist, lyricist
- Shinichi Inoue - guitarist
- Ryousuke Shimizu - drummer
- Naoyuki Tsukada - composing, synthesizer, chorus,
- Aika Ohno - composing, chorus
- Nami Kaneko - composing
- Hirohito Furui (Garnet Crow) - arranging
- Yasuharu Konishi - arranging
- Kuuron Oshiro - arranging
- Ryo Kamomiya - arranging
- Yoshinobu Ohga (nothin' but love) - guitarist
- Makoto Miyoshi (Rumania Montevideo) - guitarist
- Makoto Kimura - drummer
- Akio Nakajima - recording, mixing
- Yuji Sugiyama - recording, mixing
- Katsuyuki Yoshimatsu - assistant engineering
- Chihiro Hayashi - directing
- Yuko Sakamoto - directing
- Gan Kojima – art direction
- Rockaku - producing

== In media ==
- I Just Feel So Love Again - ending theme for anime television series Mamotte Shugogetten
- Flame Of Love - ending theme for anime television series Monster Rancher
- Lazy Drive - ending theme for TV Asahi program Yajiuma Wide
