= Sekai wa Kitto Mirai no Naka =

Single by Zard

from the album Toki no Tsubasa
- Released: June 16, 1999
- Genre: Pop rock; rock
- Label: B-Gram Records
- Composer: Izumi Sakai
- Producer: Daiko Nagato

Zard singles chronology
"Mind Games" (1999)	"Sekai wa Kitto Mirai no Naka" (1999)	"Itai Kurai Kimi ga Afureteiru yo" (1999)

"Sekai wa Kitto Mirai no Naka" (世界はきっと未来の中; "The world is certainly in the future") is the 29th single by Zard, released 16 June 1999 under the B-Gram Records label. As with their previous singles Atarashii Door and Good Day, this single doesn't include an alternate song. The single debuted at #2 the first week. It charted for nine weeks and sold over 201,000 copies. This marked the 24th consecutive single by ZARD, since Makenaide, which reached the top three in the Oricon rankings.

== Track list ==
All songs are written by Izumi Sakai.

1. Sekai wa Kitto Mirai no Naka (世界はきっと未来の中)
  - composer: Yuuichirou Iwai (New Cinema Tokage)/arrangement: Akihito Tokunaga, Hirohito Furui and 4D-JAM
2. Sekai wa Kitto Mirai no Naka (世界はきっと未来の中) (original karaoke)
