= Giza Studio Masterpiece Blend 2002 =

Greatest hits album by Various artists
- Released: December 18, 2002
- Genre: J-pop; Anime song; R&B
- Length: 120:06
- Label: Giza Studio
- Producer: Daikō Nagato

Various artists chronology
Giza Studio Masterpiece Blend 2001 (2001)	Giza Studio; Masterpiece Blend 2002 (2002)	Giza Studio Masterpiece Blend 2003 (2003)

Giza Studio Masterpiece Blend 2002 is the second greatest hits album by Giza Studio recording label. It was released on 18 December 2002. The album features a list of songs from voting inquiry by listeners.

In 2010, after fraud scandal with Azumi Uehara is nowadays album out of print.

== Charts ==
The album debuted at No. 15 on the Oricon Weekly Albums Chart, selling more than 62,000 copies in its first week or release.

== Track listing ==
Disc 1
No.	Title	Lyrics	Music	Arranger(s)	Length
1.	"Feel Fine! (Mai Kuraki)"	Mai Kuraki	Akihito Tokunaga	Tokunaga	4:49
2.	"Deep Freeze (Rina Aiuchi)"	Aiuchi	Terukado	Akira	5:41
3.	"Yime Mita Ato De (Garnet Crow)"	Azuki Nana	Yuri Nakamura	Hirohito Furui	5:57
4.	"dance (Miho Komatsu)"	Komatsu	Miho Komatsu	Yoshinobu Ohga	3:35
5.	"Mushoku (Azumi Uehara)" (無色)	Azumi Uehara	K's Letters	Tokunaga	4:14
6.	"Beginning Dream (Akane Sugazaki)"	Sugazaki	Aika Ohno	Ohga	4:41
7.	"It's for you (in dB)"	Saegusa Yuuka	Daria Kawashima	Daisuke Ikeda	4:41
8.	"Change the World (Ramjet Pulley)"	Satomi Makoshi	Kazunobu Yashima	Satoru Kobayashi; Ramjet Pulley	3:29
9.	"Stay Young (The★tambourines)"	Ami Matsunaga	Tokunaga	Tokunaga	3:52
10.	"Grand Blue (Aiko Kitahara)"	Kitahara	Tokunaga	Tokunaga	5:37
11.	"Love is a thrill, shock, suspense (Aika Ohno)"	Aiuchi	Ohno	Ohno nightclubbers	5:06
12.	"Ride on Time (Mai Kuraki)"	Kuraki	Tokunaga	Tokunaga	5:01
13.	"Secret of my heart〜U.S.A. Ver.〜 (Mai-K)"	Kuraki	Ohno	ZOO	4:34

Disc 2
No.	Title	Lyrics	Music	Arranger(s)	Length
1.	"I Can't Stop My Love for You (Rina Aiuchi)"	Aiuchi	Daria Kawashima	Kūron Oshiro	4:20
2.	"Spiral (Garnet Crow)"	Azuki Nana	Yuri Nakamura	Hirohito Furui	4:17
3.	"Give me one more chance (Mai Kuraki)"	Kuraki	Aika Ohno	DJ Me-ya	4:41
4.	"gift (Miho Komatsu)"	Komatsu	Komatsu	Yoshinobu Ohga	3:23
5.	"Flower (Ramjet Pulley)"	Makoshi	Yashima	Satoru Kobayashi; Ramjet Pulley	3:26
6.	"All for your love (WAG)"	WAG	Masataka Kitaura	Ohga
7.	"wonder boy (The★tambourines)"	Ami Matsunaga	Tokunaga	Ohga	4:03
8.	"Power of Words (Rina Aiuchi)"	Aiuchi	Chiho Kiyooka	KCP	4:57
9.	"Sky Blue (Garnet Crow)"	Azuki Nana	Yuri Nakamura	Hirohito Furui	3:32
10.	"Tear Drop (Azumi Uehara)"	Uehara	Masazumi Ozawa	Kobayashi	5:10
11.	"Stray Beast (Hitoshi Okamoto)"	Nana	Okamoto	Okamoto	3:52
12.	"Don't Worry Baby (Mai Kuraki)"	Wilson, Christian	Brian Wilson, Roger Christian	DJ ME-YA	3:29
13.	"Feel fine!: M-oz club mix (Mai Kuraki)"	Kuraki	Tokunaga	Ozawa
