= Eien (disambiguation) =

Eien is a Japanese era name.

Eien may also refer to:

- Eien (album), a 1999 album by Zard
- "Eien" (Zard song), 1997
- "Eien" (Beni song), 2012
- "Eien / Universe / Believe in Love", a 2009 song by BoA
