= Toki no Tsubasa =

Studio album by Zard
- Released: February 15, 2001 30th Anniversary Rerelease On September 15, 2021
- Recorded: 1999–2000
- Studio: B-Gram RECORD
- Genre: Pop; electronica; dance-pop; R&B; hip-hop
- Length: 65:26
- Language: Japanese; English
- Label: B-Gram
- Producer: Izumi Sakai

Zard chronology
Eien (1999)	Toki no Tsubasa (2001)	Tomatteita Tokei ga Ima Ugokidashita (2004)

Singles from Toki no Tsubasa
- 1. "Sekai wa Kitto Mirai no Naka" Released: 16 June 1999; 2. "Itai Kurai Kimi ga Afureteiru yo" Released: 14 October 1999; 3. "Kono Namida Hoshi ni Nare" Released: 1 December 1999; 4. "Get U're Dream" Released: 6 September 2000; 5. "Promised You" Released: 15 November 2000

Toki no Tsubasa (時間の翼, Wings of Time) is the ninth album by Zard, released on February 15, 2001, by B-Gram Records.

== Background ==
The album consists of five previously released singles between the years 1999 and 2000. It was released for the tenth anniversary of ZARD's debut. Two famous songs were remixed for anniversary celebration: "Makenaide" and "Yureru Omoi".

On July 26, 2021, it was announced that all 11 of ZARD's studio albums would be re-released as part of its 30th anniversary campaign on September 15. Ten of them are being released as remastered editions, while the re-issue of Toki no Tsubasa is a re-arranged edition with all ten original songs remixed by Yumeto Tsurusawa.

== Chart performance ==
The album reached number one in its first week on the Oricon charts. It charted 10 weeks and sold over 371,000 copies. This is the band's last studio album to reach number one in the Oricon charts.

== Track listing ==
All lyrics written by Izumi Sakai.

No.	Title	Music	Arrangers	Length
1.	"Get U're Dream"	Aika Ohno	Takeshi Hayama	5:14
2.	"Kono Namida Hoshi ni Nare" (この涙 星になれ)	Yuuichirou Iwai (New Cinema Tokage)	Hirohito Furui (Garnet Crow)	5:36
3.	"Promised You~with P-edition~"	Seiichiro Kuribayashi	Cybersound (Michael Africk, Perry Geyer, Miguel Sa Pessoa)	5:36
4.	"Itai Kurai Kimi ga Afureteiru yo" (痛いくらい君があふれているよ)	4D-JAM	4D-JAM	4:48
5.	"Mado no Soto wa Monochrome" (窓の外はモノクローム)	Iwai	Yoshinobu Ohga	5:16
6.	"Omohide" (お・も・ひ・で)	Hiroshi Terao	Furui and Akihito Tokunaga	4:17
7.	"Ashita Moshi Kimi ga Kowaretemo" (明日もし君が壊れても, the song was originally performed by Wands)	Ohno	Tokunaga	4:17
8.	"Sekai wa Kitto Mirai no Naka〜another style 21〜" (世界はきっと未来の中)	Iwai	Tokunaga and Ohga	4:02
9.	"Hero"	Ohno	Ohga	5:01
10.	"Yureru Omoi Gomi's New York Remix" (揺れる想い)	Tetsurou Oda	Gomi	10:42
11.	"Makenaide Gomi's 10th Anniversary Special Mix" (負けないで)	Oda	Gomi	8:08
12.	"Toki no Tsubasa" (時間の翼)	Ohno	Tokunaga	2:29

30th anniversary re-issue
No.	Title	Music	Arrangers	Length
1.	"Get U're Dream"	Aika Ohno	Yumeto Tsurusawa	5:10
2.	"Kono Namida Hoshi ni Nare" (この涙 星になれ)	Yuuichirou Iwai (New Cinema Tokage)	Tsurusawa	4:33
3.	"Promised You"	Seiichiro Kuribayashi	Tsurusawa	5:28
4.	"Itai Kurai Kimi ga Afureteiru yo" (痛いくらい君があふれているよ)	4D-JAM	Tsurusawa	4:16
5.	"Mado no Soto wa Monochrome" (窓の外はモノクローム)	Iwai	Tsurusawa	5:08
6.	"Omohide" (お・も・ひ・で)	Hiroshi Terao	Tsurusawa	4:07
7.	"Ashita Moshi Kimi ga Kowaretemo" (明日もし君が壊れても)	Ohno	Tsurusawa	4:09
8.	"Sekai wa Kitto Mirai no Naka" (世界はきっと未来の中)	Iwai	Tsurusawa	4:01
9.	"Hero"	Ohno	Tsurusawa	5:00
10.	"Toki no Tsubasa 〜30th Anniversary〜" (時間の翼)	Ohno	Tsurusawa	3:26

== Use in media ==
- Sekai wa Kitto Mirai no Naka: theme song for drama "Maikosan wa Meitantei!"
- Itai Kurai Kimi ga Afureteiru yo: commercial song of Nescafé Moment
- Kono Namida Hoshi ni Nare: theme song for drama "Kasouken no Onnna"
- Get U're Dream: streaming theme song for NHK program "NHK Sydney Olympics"
- Promised You: theme song for TV Asahi program "Saturday Night at the Mysteries"
