= Kono Namida Hoshi ni Nare =

Single by Zard

from the album Toki no Tsubasa
- Released: December 1, 1999
- Genre: Pop rock; hard Rock; alternative rock
- Label: B-Gram Records
- Songwriter(s): Izumi Sakai, Yuuichirou Iwai
- Producer(s): Daiko Nagato

Zard singles chronology
"Itai Kurai Kimi ga Afureteiru yo" (1999)	"Kono Namida Hoshi ni Nare" (1999)	"Get U're Dream" (2000)

Kono Namida Hoshi ni Nare (この涙 星になれ)" is the 31st single by Zard, released 1 December 1999 under the B-Gram Records label. This is Zard's first single released in 12 cm CD format. The single opened at #5 rank the first week. It charted for six weeks and sold over 129,000 copies.

== Track list ==
All songs are written by Izumi Sakai.

1. Kono Namida Hoshi ni Nare (この涙 星になれ)
  - composer: Yuuichirou Iwai (New Cinema Tokage)/arrangement: Hirohito Furui
    - the song was used in TV Asahi drama Kasouken no Onna as theme song
2. O・mo・hi・de (お・も・ひ・で)
  - composer: Hiroshi Terao/arrangement: Akihito Tokunaga and Furui
3. Kono Namida Hoshi ni Nare (この涙 星になれ)(original karaoke)
4. O・mo・hi・de (お・も・ひ・で)(original karaoke)
5. Kono Namida Hoshi ni Nare (この涙 星になれ) remix
