= 4D-JAM =

Japanese rock band

- Also known as: 4D; D-JAM
- Origin: Japan
- Genres: R&B, Soul, House
- Years active: 1998–2002, since 2013
- Labels: Styling Records(1998); Garage Indies Zapping Association (1999); Giza Studio (1999–2002); Con4Tunes (since 2014)
- Past members: Maho Furukawa; Kenji Shiojiri; Hiromu Nakao; E:mju; Mirai & Nozomi
- Website: Official Website

4D-Jam is a Japanese R&B and soul music unit under the Giza Studio label active in 1998–2002. In 2014, they came back from 12-year hiatus under indies label Con4Tunes.

== Members ==
- Maho Furukawa (ふるかわ♥魔法)) – vocalist, lyricist
- Kenji Shiojiri (シオジリケンジ) – leader, vocalist, composer, lyricist, arranger
- Hiromu Nakao (中尾弘)) – arranger
- E:mju – DJ
- Mirai & Nozomi – Dancers

== History ==
The formation of the band began in 1996 with Kenji and Hiromu together.

In September 1998, as a duo unit they released analog single Finger under indies R&B label Styling Records. In the same month, during music television program's audition Hip Hop performing Minnie Riperton's Lovin' You. Soon after, she joined 4D-Jam as a main vocalist and become Maho's solo project.

In March 1999, as a trio unit they released a first indies single Taiyou no Nai Asa Tsuki no Nai Yoru under indies label Garage Indies Zapping Association. One month later in April, they released the major single Cocoro. During the production of the second single, dancers Mirani and Nozomi left the unit, while DJ E:mju joined 4D-Jam. In June, Kenji was involved with music production as arranger for Zard's single Sekai wa Kitto Mirai no Naka along with Hirohito Furui and Yuuichirou Iwai from New Cinema Tokage. In the same month, they released their first media song city of tracks which was used as ending theme for the DirecTV program Matsuo Kiyoshi Teki Ongaku Seikatsu. In August, they released major album City of Tracks, however the album didn't enter the Oricon Weekly Charts. In October, Kenji was involved once more with Zard music production as composer and arranger of the single Itai Kurai Kimi ga Afureteiru yo; Maho and Hiromu were involved as well as chorus members. In November, their fourth single Ma Life was commercially used as an opening theme for the Tokyo Broadcasting System Television program Kyaeen: Kanpei no Megami no Shinsou.

In January 2000, Maho was involved with music production as a chorus member in Rumania Montevideo's second studio album Girl, Girl, Boy, Girl, Boy. In March 2000, one year after major debut, their fourth single Wondering Hands had become their first anime song for the television series Monster Rancher. After the release of the single B Original, E:mju left the unit. In July, they released their second and final studio album Come Jam Space. It was their first and only work which reached rank No. 89 in the Oricon Weekly Charts, charting for two weeks and selling a total of 5,490 copies. In August, Maho was involved with the music production as a chorus member in the Rumania Montevideo single Start All Over Again.

In April 2001, Maho was involved with music production as a chorus member in The Tambourines debut single Easy game. In May 2001, they released their final single Big Good Lovin'. The single was included in Giza Studio's compilation album Giza Studio Masterpiece Blend 2001. In June, Kenji provided music for singer-songwriter Miki Matsuhashi's debut single Time Stand Still. In August, Maho provided chorus support for the Mai Kuraki single Can't Forget Your Love.

In January 2002, Maho provided chorus support for Mai Kuraki's single Winter Bells. In October 2002, the unit entered into hiatus without announcement. The whereabouts of Hiromu were unknown.

In 2013, the unit came back from hiatus with Maho as lead vocalist and Kenji as composer and arranger and under indies label Con4Tunes. In 2014, they released digital single Music and third studio album S・S・S〜Soul Searchin’ System.

== Discography ==
=== Singles ===
	Release Day	Title	CD code
Indies	1999/3/10	Taiyou no Nai Asa Tsuki no Nai Yoru	ICR-5
1st	1999/4/21	Cocoro	GZCA-1005
2nd	1999/6/30	City of Tracks	GZCA-1009
3rd	1999/11/17	Ma Life	GZCA-1015
4th	2000/2/23	Wonderin' Hands	GZCA-1020
5th	2000/5/24	B ORIGINAL	GZCA-1031
6th	2001/5/23	Big Good Lovin'	GZCA-1078
7th	2014/3/7	Music	-

=== Studio album ===
	Release Day	Title	Chart
1st	1999/8/4	CITY OF TRACKS	-
2nd	2000/7/5	COME JAM SPACE	86
3rd	2014/5/28	S.S.S ~ Soul Searchin' System	-

== Magazine appearances ==
From Music Freak Magazine:

- Vol.52 1999/March
- Vol.53 1999/April
- Vol.55 1999/June
- Vol.57 1999/August
- Vol.60 1999/November
- Vol.63 2000/February
- Vol.66 2000/May
- Vol.67 2000/June
- Vol.68 2000/July
- Vol.69 2000/August
- Vol.73 2000/December
- Vol.78 2001/May

From J Groove Music:

- Vol.9 2001/July
