= Iki mo Dekinai =

Single by Zard

from the album Eien
- Released: March 4, 1998
- Genre: Pop rock
- Label: B-Gram Records
- Songwriter(s): Izumi Sakai, Tetsurō Oda
- Producer(s): Daiko Nagato

Zard singles chronology
"My Baby Grand ~Nukumori ga Hoshikute~" (1997)	"Iki mo Dekinai" (1998)	"Unmei no Roulette Mawashite" (1998)

"Iki mo Dekinai (息もできない)" is the 24th single by Zard and released 4 March 1998 under B-Gram Records label. The single debuted at #3 rank first week. It charted for 10 weeks and sold over 240,000 copies.

== Track list ==
All lyrics are written by Izumi Sakai

No.	Title	Music	Arrangers	Length
1.	"Iki mo Dekinai" (息もできない)	Tetsurō Oda	Takeshi Hayama	4:38
2.	"Vintage"	Akihito Tokunaga	Akihito Tokunaga	3:21
3.	"Iki mo Dekinai" (Original Karaoke)			4:38
4.	"Vintage" (Original Karaoke)			3:21

== Usage in media ==
- Iki mo Dekinai: the song was used as opening theme for anime television series Chūka Ichiban!
