= Get U're Dream =

2000 single by Zard

Single by Zard

from the album Toki no Tsubasa
- Released: September 6, 2000
- Genre: R&B; soul; pop rock
- Length: 5:11
- Label: B-Gram Records
- Songwriter(s): Izumi Sakai, Aika Ohno
- Producer(s): Daiko Nagato

Zard singles chronology
| "Kono Namida Hoshi ni Nare" (1999) | "Get U're Dream" (2000) | "Promised You" (2000) |

"Get U're Dream" is the 32nd single by Japanese band Zard and released September 6, 2000 under the B-Gram Records label. The composer of Get U're Dream, Aika Ohno self-cover this single in her cover album Silent Passage.

The single opened at #4 the first week. It charted for eight weeks and sold over 241,000 copies.

== Track list ==
All songs are written by Izumi Sakai and composed by Aika Ohno

1. Get U're Dream
  - arrangement: Takeshi Hayama
  - Michael Africk, Aika Ohno and Izumi Sakai participated in chorus part
    - the song was used in NHK's Sydney Olympics as theme song
2. Get U're Dream (version 2)
  - arrangement: Akihito Tokunaga
    - compared to first version, this arrangement has rock feel
3. Get U're Dream (version 3)
  - arrangement: Yoko Blaqstone
    - Yoko Blaqstone fully participated in chorus part, this arrangement has r&b feel
4. Get U're Dream(original karaoke)
5. Get U're Dream (Perry Geyer Short Mix)
  - remix: perry geyer
    - MIchael Africk fully participated in chorus part
