= My Baby Grand ~Nukumori ga Hoshikute~ =

Single by Zard

from the album Eien
- Released: December 3, 1997
- Genre: Pop rock
- Label: B-Gram Records
- Songwriter(s): Izumi Sakai, Tetsurō Oda
- Producer(s): Daiko Nagato

Zard singles chronology
"Eien (Zard song)" (1997)	"My Baby Grand ~Nukumori ga Hoshikute~" (1997)	"Iki mo Dekinai" (1998)

"My Baby Grand ~Nukumori ga Hoshikute~ (My Baby Grand 〜ぬくもりが欲しくて〜)" is the 23rd single by Zard and released 3 December 1997 under B-Gram Records label. The single debuted at #3 rank first week. It charted for nine weeks and sold over 331,000 copies.

== Track list ==
All lyrics are written by Izumi Sakai

No.	Title	Music	Arrangers	Length
1.	"My Baby Grand ~Nukumori ga Hoshikute~" (My Baby Grand 〜ぬくもりが欲しくて〜)	Tetsurō Oda	Daisuke Ikeda	4:13
2.	"Love is Gone"	Masaaki Watanuki	Ikeda	4:27
3.	"My Baby Grand ~Nukumori ga Hoshikute~" (Original Karaoke)			4:13
4.	"Love is Gone" (Original Karaoke)			4:27

== Usage in media ==
- My Baby Grand ~Nukumori ga Hoshikute~: used as commercial film song for company NTT DoCoMo of "DoCoMo 1997 Fuyu"
