= Sunny,Cloudy,Rain =

EP by Rumania Montevideo
- Released: March 29, 1999
- Recorded: 1999
- Studio: Red Way Studio
- Genres: J-pop, rock, lounge
- Length: 20:17
- Label: Garage Indies Zapping Association
- Producers: Rockaku, Rumania Montevideo

Rumania Montevideo chronology
Jet Plane (1999)	Sunny,Cloudy,Rain (1999)	Rumaniamania (1999)

Sunny,Cloudy,Rain is the second mini album by Japanese rock band Rumania Montevideo. The mini album was released on March 29, 1999, by indie label Garage Indies Zapping Association. The album was rereleased on April 14, 1999.

== Background ==
On the same day as the rerelease, the band released their debut single, Still For Your Love, under the major label Giza Studio, which was used as the ending theme for the anime television series, Detective Conan.

The album consists of a total of six tracks. All the songs are performed in English, and not in Japanese.

Shine Today was performed by composer Makoto Miyoshi, and not by original vocalist Mami.

Snap was later re-recorded as a completely new song with a new arrangement, lyrics, and composition. It was released as the single Digital Music Power on September. This was used as an ending theme for the anime television series Monster Rancher.

A Walk Shaded By Apple Trees was performed at the acoustic live performance UNDOWN vol.4.

After the release of the album, the band left their indie label and joined the major label Giza Studio.

== Track listing ==
All tracks are composed by Makoto Miyoshi, written by Mami Miyoshi (except track #6, by Makoto Miyoshi) and arranged by Hirohito Furui.

No.	Title	Length
1.	"Snap"	3:28
2.	"A Walk Shaded By Apple Trees"	2:27
3.	"Sub Channel"	4:26
4.	"Someone Must Be There"	4:07
5.	"Star"	3:56
6.	"Shine Today"	5:12

== Personnel ==
Credits adapted from the CD booklet of Sunny,Cloudy,Rain.

- Mami Miyoshi – vocals, lyrics, drums
- Makoto Miyoshi – vocals, lyrics, composing, guitar, arranging
- Satomi Makoshi – bass
- Akiko Matsuda – keyboard, saxophone
- Kazunobu Mashima – guitar
- Hirohito Furui – arranging (Garnet Crow)
- Hitoshi Okamoto – guitar
- Rockaku – executive producing
- Red Way Studio – recording, mixing
- Cule – A&R
