= Mind Games (Zard song) =

Single by Zard

from the album Zard Best: Request Memorial
- Released: April 7, 1999
- Genre: Pop rock; R&B; EDM
- Label: B-Gram Records
- Songwriters: Izumi Sakai, Masaaki Watanuki
- Producer: Daiko Nagato

Zard singles chronology
"Atarashii Door ~Fuyu no Himawari~" (1998)	"Mind Games" (1999)	"Sekai wa Kitto Mirai no Naka" (1999)

"Mind Games" is the 28th single by Zard and released April 7, 1999 under B-Gram Records. This is the significant song for Zard starting to step out of pop rock and Soft rock, and began to integrate electronic dance music and R&B elements into pop rock music, and the media commented that the quality of this song was far less than that of Zard at the peak, and the new music style was very stiff and lacking sincerity. The single became Zard's last number-one Hit.

The single debuted at #1 on the first week. It charted for six weeks and sold over 167,000 copies. This is the last time a Zard single would reach #1 first week in Oricon rankings.

== Track list ==
All songs are written by Izumi Sakai.

1. Mind Games
  - composer: Masaaki Watanuki/arrangement: Hirohito Furui
    - the song was used in Fuji TV program Pro Yakyuu News as theme song
2. Hypnosis
  - composer: Hitoshi Okamoto/arrangement: Hitoshi Okamoto and Furui
3. Mind Games (Redway Secret Mix)
4. Mind Games (original karaoke)
