= Kaze ga Toori Nukeru Machi he =

Single by Zard

from the album Eien
- Released: July 2, 1997
- Genre: Pop rock; J-pop; folk rock
- Label: B-Gram Records
- Songwriters: Izumi Sakai, Tetsurō Oda
- Producer: Daiko Nagato

Zard singles chronology
"Kimi ni Aitaku Nattara..." (1997)	"Kaze ga Toori Nukeru Machi he" (1997)	"Eien" (1997)

"Kaze ga Toori Nukeru Machi he (風が通り抜ける街へ)" is the 21st single by Zard, released on 2 July 1997 by B-Gram Records. The single reached #3 in the charts in its first week, stayed in the charts for 8 weeks and sold over 281,000 copies.

== Track list ==
All lyrics are written by Izumi Sakai

No.	Title	Music	Arrangers	Length
1.	"Kaze ga Toori Nukeru Machi he" (風が通り抜ける街へ)	Tetsurō Oda	Akihito Tokunaga	4:43
2.	"Tooi Hoshi wo Oshiete" (遠い星を数えて, Yoko Blaqstone and Shinichiro Ohta participated in chorus part)	Seiichiro Kuribayashi	Akihito Tokunaga	5:10
3.	"Kaze ga Toori Nukeru Machi he" (Original Karaoke)			4:42
4.	"Tooi Hoshi wo Oshiete" (Original Karaoke)			5:09

== Use in media ==
- "Kaze ga Toori Nukeru Machi he" was used as campaigning song for Japan Racing Association of "'97 Summer JRA".
- A cover of the coupling song "Tooi Hoshi wo Oshiete" by Sard Underground was used as the ending theme for the 2021 drama Nishiogikubo Mitsuboshi Youshudo.
