= Kimi ni Aitaku Nattara... =

Single by Zard

from the album Zard Blend: Sun&Stone
- Released: February 26, 1997
- Genre: Pop rock
- Label: B-Gram Records
- Songwriters: Izumi Sakai, Tetsurō Oda
- Producer: Daiko Nagato

Zard singles chronology
"Don't You See!" (1997)	"Kimi ni Aitaku Nattara..." (1997)	"Kaze ga Toori Nukeru Machi he" (1997)

"Kimi ni Aitaku Nattara... (君に逢いたくなったら…)" is the 20th single by Zard released on February 26, 1997 via B-Gram Records. The single debuted at #2 rank first week. It charted for 11 weeks and sold over 636,000 copies.

== Track list ==
All songs are written by Izumi Sakai.

1. Kimi ni Aitaku Nattara... (君に逢いたくなったら…)
  - composer: Tetsurō Oda/arrangement: Takeshi Hayama
    - the song was used in TBS drama Risou no Kekkon as theme song
2. Ai wo Shinjiteitai (愛を信じていたい)
  - composer and arrangement: Akihito Tokunaga
3. Kimi ni Aitaku Nattara... (君に逢いたくなったら…) (original karaoke)
4. Ai wo Shinjiteitai (愛を信じていたい) (original karaoke)
