= Good Day (Zard song) =

Single by Zard

from the album Eien
- Released: December 2, 1998
- Genre: Pop rock; adult-oriented rock
- Label: B-Gram
- Songwriters: Izumi Sakai, Masaaki Watanuki
- Producer: Daiko Nagato

Zard singles chronology
"Atarashii Door ~Fuyu no Himawari~" (1998)	"Good Day" (1998)	"Mind Games" (1999)

"Good Day" is the 27th single by Zard and released on December 2, 1998 under B-Gram Records label. It was released on same day as previous 26th single, Atarashii Door ~Fuyu no Himawari~. The single debuted at #2 on the first week. It charted for eight weeks and sold over 223,000 copies.

== Track list ==
All songs are written by Izumi Sakai.

1. Good Day
  - composer: Masaaki Watanuki/arrangement: Daisuke Ikeda
2. Good Day (original karaoke)
