= Control Your Touch =

Studio album by Yumi Shizukusa
- Released: 3 December 2003
- Genre: J-pop; R&B
- Length: 22:35
- Language: Japanese; English
- Label: Styling Records; Giza Studio

Yumi Shizukusa chronology
Control Your Touch (2003)	Yumi Shizukusa II (2004)

Singles from Control Your Touch
- 1. "Don't You Wanna See Me (Oh) Tonight?" Released: 2 July 2003; 2. "Take Me Take Me" Released: 25 September 2003; 3. "Control Your Touch" Released: 19 November 2003

Control Your Touch (stylized as CONTROL Your touch) is the debut studio album by Japanese singer-songwriter Yumi Shizukusa. It was released on 3 December 2003 through Styling Records and Giza Studio.

== Singles ==
After appearing on two compilation albums, Giza Studio Mai-K & Friends Hotrod Beach Party (2002) and Day Track "Lady Mastersoul" (2003), Shizukusa released the debut single, "Don't You Wanna See Me (Oh) Tonight?" on 2 July 2003. Despite only peaking at number 35, the song gained the biggest numbers of radio power rotation in Japan at that time.

== Track listing ==
No.	Title	Writer(s)	Producer(s)	Length
1.	"Prologue"		DJ Me-Ja	1:05
2.	"Control Your Touch"	Akihito Tokunaga; Yumi Shizukusa	Tokunaga	5:02
3.	"Don't You Wanna See Me (Oh) Tonight?"	Tokunaga; Shizukusa	Tokunaga	4:01
4.	"Move On" (Bounce Mix)	Shizukusa; Yoko Black. Stone; Yoshinobu Ohga; Tomoo Kasahara	Yoko	4:37
5.	"Nemurenu Shoujo"	Shizukusa; Yoko; Ohga; Kasahara	Yoko; Ohga; Kasahara	5:38
6.	"Hoshidukiyo" (Angel vs Devil Version)	Shizukusa; Yoko	Heavy Hitters Music	4:29
7.	"Boy"	Shizukusa; Deron Reynolds	Ohga	4:20
8.	"Sometimes"	Shizukusa; Tokunaga	Tokunaga	3:24
9.	"Take Me Take Me"	Shizukusa; Tokunaga	Tokunaga	4:20
10.	"Any More" (No More Tears Version)	Shizukusa; Raynolds	Akira Onozuka; Buddhaphonic; Ohga	4:27
11.	"Tell Me How You Feel"	Shizukusa; Yoko; Ohga; Kasahara	Yoko	4:42
12.	"I Believe in You"	Shizukusa; Jeffrey Qwest; Stephen Hanuman	Qwest; Hanumap	4:32
Total length:				22:35

== Charts ==
Chart (2003)	Peak position
Oricon Albums Chart	97

== Release history ==
Country	Date	Format	Label	Ref.
Japan	3 December 2003	CD; digital download	Styling Records; Giza Studio	
