= Promised You =

2000 single by Zard

Single by Zard

from the album Toki no Tsubasa
- Released: November 15, 2000
- Genre: Pop
- Label: B-Gram Records
- Songwriters: Izumi Sakai, Seiichiro Kuribayashi
- Producer: Daiko Nagato

Zard singles chronology
"Get U're Dream" (2000)	"Promised You" (2000)	"Sawayakana Kimi no Kimochi" (2002)

"Promised You" is the 33rd single by Zard, released November 15, 2000 under the B-Gram Records label. The single opened at #6 the first week. It charted for five weeks and sold over 115,000 copies.

== Track list ==
All songs are written by Izumi Sakai.

1. promised you
  - composer: Seiichiro Kuribayashi/arrangement: Cybersound (Michael Africk, Perry Geyer, Miguel Sa Pessoa)
  - Michael Africk wrote and performed as a vocalist
    - the song was used in TV Asahi program Saturday Night at the Mysteries as theme song
2. The Only Truth I Know is You
  - composer and arrangement: Akihito Tokunaga
3. Promised You (original karaoke)
