= Rumaniamania =

Studio album by Rumania Montevideo
- Released: June 16, 1999
- Recorded: 1999
- Genre: J-pop; rock; country
- Length: 43:58
- Label: Giza
- Producer: Makoto Miyoshi; Rockaku

Rumania Montevideo chronology
Sunny,Cloudy,Rain (1999)	Rumaniamania (1999)	Girl, Girl, Boy, Girl, Boy (2000)

Singles from Rumaniamania
- 1. "Still For Your Love" Released: 14 April 1999

Rumaniamania is the debut studio album by Japanese J-pop band Rumania Montevideo. It was released on June 16, 1999, by Giza Studio label.

== Background ==
The album consist only of their debut single: Still for your love. The beginning of single recording started near end of year 1998 during their formation period and made it into television on-air in January 1999. It became their smash-hit which sold more than 165,000 copies and charted on Oricon rankings for 13 weeks. B-side song Good-Bye Summer Vacation was included in this album as well.

Lifevideo is the second and final original song performed and written by leader of the band, Makoto.

Sayonara was re-recorded from the original song Jonathan which was performed in English and included in their first indies album Jet Plane.

Anny was performed in acoustic live performance "UNDOWN vol.4".

== Charting ==
The album reached #9 rank in Oricon for first week. It charted for 6 weeks and sold 92,360 copies.

== Track listing ==
All lyrics are written by Mami Miyoshi (expect of #1, by Makoto Miyoshi); all music is composed by Makoto Miyoshi

No.	Title	Length
1.	"Lifevideo"	3:59
2.	"Still for Your Love"	4:21
3.	"Kohaku (コハク)"	3:20
4.	"Sayonara (さよなら)" (re-recorded version of "Jonathan" from 1st indies album "Jet Plane")	4:25
5.	"Daylight"	3:43
6.	"Yesterday"	4:23
7.	"Pair"	3:40
8.	"Gunshuu (群衆)"	4:02
9.	"Anny"	4:03
10.	"Good-bye Summer Vacation"	3:07
11.	"Repeat"	4:55

== Personnel ==
Credits adapted from the CD booklet of Rumania Mania.

- Mami Miyoshi – vocals, songwriting, drums
- Makoto Miyoshi - producer, vocals, guitar, arranging, composing, songwriting,
- Satomi Makoshi - bass, backing vocals
- Akiko Matsuda - keyboards, backing vocals, saxophone
- Kazunobu Mashima - guitar
- Hirohito Furui (Garnet Crow) - arranging
- Yoshinori Akai - recording, mixing
- Secil Minami - backing vocals
- Takumi Ito - backing vocals
- Toshiyuki Ebihara (cule) - A&R
- Daisuke Suzuki (cule) - A&R
- Hideaki Magarite - artist management
- Gan Kojima – art direction
- Rockaku - producing

== In media ==
- Still for your love: ending theme song for the Anime television series Detective Conan.
