= Chika Yoshida =

Japanese singer (born 1979)

Chika Yoshida 吉田知加
- Born: September 11, 1979 (age 46); Kyoto Prefecture, Japan
- Genres: J-pop
- Occupations: singer; songwriter
- Years active: 2000–2002
- Label: Giza Studio
- Website: www.giza.co.jp/chika/

Chika Yoshida (吉田 知加, Yoshida Chika; born 11 September 1979) is a former Japanese pop singer and songwriter under the Giza Studio label.

== Biography ==
Before debuting in August 2000, Chika appeared as a guest of the live session Undown Presents in Kyoto Jittoku.

In September 2000, she debuted with the single Koubutsu written and produced by Chika herself. It was released as both a CD and a cassette tape. The single reached #70 on the Oricon weekly chart, with over 2,500 copies sold. Some fans called her Giza version of Shiina Ringo due to similar melody and voice styles.

Her fourth single Aishini kite Hoshii/Gamusharana Ai was written by a former member of the Japanese band Pamelah (band), Masazumi Ozawa and Makoto Miyoshi from Rumania Montevideo.

Between April and June 2001, she was the main DJ on the radio program Liberal Flower which was broadcast at FM Kyoto.

In May 2001, she released her first and only studio album Yoshida Chika: 12 no Hana.

In December, her fifth single was included in Giza Studio's compilation album Giza Studio Masterpiece Blend 2001, the single was written by Hirohito Furui from Garnet Crow and Masataka Kitaura.

In March 2002, she released her final single Hanareba Nare ni.

In August 2002, through the official website, she announced a hiatus from all her music activities.

== Musical style ==
=== Influence ===
On her online website diary she took inspiration during music production from the following artists: Fiona Apple, Thee Headcoats and Yura Yura Teikoku.

== Discography ==
During her career, she released six singles and one studio album.

=== Singles ===
No.	Release Day	Title	Rank
1st	20/9/2000	Koubusu (こうぶつ)	77
2nd	22/11/2000	Setsuna Kei (刹那系)	-
3rd	24/1/2001	Sangai: Nokorimono (残骸 -のこりもの-)	-
4th	18/4/2001	Aishi ni Kite Hoshii/Gamushara na Ai (愛シニ来テ欲シイ/がむしゃら な 愛)	-
5th	12/9/2001	Tsuki ni Inori wo (月に祈りを)	-
6th	12/3/2002	Hanareba Nareni (はなればなれに)	-

=== Album ===
No.	Release Day	Title
1st	2001/05/23	Yoshida Chika: 12 no Hana (吉田知加〜12の花〜)

== Authority ==
- Musicbrainz
