= Itai Kurai Kimi ga Afureteiru yo =

Single by Zard

from the album Toki no Tsubasa
- Released: October 14, 1999
- Genre: Hip-hop; pop; R&B
- Label: B-Gram Records
- Songwriters: Izumi Sakai, 4D-JAM
- Producer: Daiko Nagato

Zard singles chronology
| "Sekai wa Kitto Mirai no Naka" (1999) | "Itai Kurai Kimi ga Afureteiru yo" (1999) | "Kono Namida Hoshi ni Nare" (1999) |

Itai Kurai Kimi ga Afureteiru yo (痛いくらい君があふれているよ)" is the 30th single by Zard, released 14 October 1999 under the B-Gram Records label. This is Zard's last single released in 8 cm CD format. The single opened at #5 rank the first week. It charted for six weeks and sold over 124,000 copies.

== Track list ==
All songs are written by Izumi Sakai.

1. Itai Kurai Kimi ga Afureteiru yo (痛いくらい君があふれているよ)
  - composer and arrangement: 4D-JAM
2. Itai Kurai Kimi ga Afureteiru yo (痛いくらい君があふれているよ)(Re-mix)
  - remix: FAST ALVA and ME-YA
3. Itai Kurai Kimi ga Afureteiru yo (痛いくらい君があふれているよ) (original karaoke)
