= Jet Plane (Album) =

EP by Rumania Montevideo
- Released: January 30, 1999
- Recorded: 1998–1999
- Studios: Red Way Studio, Blue Way Studio
- Genres: J-pop, rock
- Length: 17:04
- Label: Garage Indies Zapping Association
- Producers: Rockaku, Rumania Montevideo

Rumania Montevideo chronology
Jet Plane (1999)	Sunny,Cloudy,Rain (1999)

Jet Plane is the debut mini album by Japanese rock band Rumania Montevideo. The mini album was released on January 30, 1999, by indies label "Garage Indies Zapping Association". The album was reprinted on March 5, 1999.

== Background ==
The album consists of total six tracks. All their songs are performed in English, not in Japanese.

The songs Jonathan and "Picnic" were later re-recorded as completely new songs with a new arrangement, lyrics, and composition.

Jonathan was released on their debut studio album Rumaniamania as Sayonara. Compared to Jonathan, the Sayonara is more than half minute longer. Picnic was released as a single Picnic on November, which was used as an opening theme for Anime television series Monster Rancher.

Jonathan, Picnic and Jet Plane were performed in acoustic live performance "UNDOWN vol.4".

The album was released in paper format for CD and a special mini booklet with lyrics and Q&A section.

== Track listing ==
All lyrics are written by Mami Miyoshi and arranged by Hirohito Furui; all music is composed by Makoto Miyoshi.

No.	Title	Length
1.	"Picnic"	3:22
2.	"Jonathan"	3:14
3.	"Half Moon"	3:08
4.	"Another day is yet to be"	2:46
5.	"Jet Plane"	1:30
6.	"I can't help but hold you tight"	3:07

== Personnel ==
Credits adapted from the CD booklet of Jet Plane.

- Mami Miyoshi – vocals, lyrics, drums
- Makoto Miyoshi - vocals, lyrics, composing, lead guitar, arranging
- Satomi Makoshi – bass
- Akiko Matsuda – saxophone, keyboard
- Kazunobu Mashima – guitar
- Hirohito Furui – arranging (Garnet Crow)
- Yoshinori Akari – mixing
- Shuji Yamada – assistant engineer
- Yasuko Yamamoto – management
- Takehiko Kawasaki – management
- Rockaku – executive producing
- Red Way Studio – recording, mixing
- Koui Yaginuma – photo
- Hitoshi Odajima – design
- Sakiko Matsushita – design
- Kazunori Okubo – supervisor
- Tomoko Kataoka – as special thanx
- Cule – A&R
