= Eien (album) =

Studio album by Zard
- Released: February 17, 1999
- Genres: Pop rock; R&B
- Length: 61:54
- Label: B-Gram
- Producer: Izumi Sakai

Zard chronology
Today is Another Day (1996)	Eien (1999)	Toki no Tsubasa (2001)

Singles from Eien
- 1. "Kaze ga Toori Nukeru Machi he" Released: 2 July 1997; 2. "Eien" Released: 20 August 1997; 3. "My Baby Grand ~Nukumori ga Hoshikute~" Released: 3 December 1997; 4. "Iki mo Dekinai" Released: 3 April 1998; 5. "Unmei no Roulette Mawashite" Released: 17 September 1998; 6. "Atarashii Door ~Fuyu no Himawari~" Released: 2 December 1998; 7. "Good Day" Released: 2 December 1998

Eien (永遠, Eternity) is the eighth studio album by Zard, released on February 17, 1999, under B-Gram Records label.

== Chart performance ==
The album charted #1 rank in Oricon first week. It charted for 17 weeks and sold more than 1,149,000 copies.

== Track listing ==
All lyrics by Izumi Sakai.

No.	Title	Music	Arrangers	Length
1.	"Eien" (永遠)	Akihito Tokunaga	Tokunaga	3:51
2.	"My Baby Grand ~Nukumori ga Hoshikute~" (〜ぬくもりが欲しくて〜)	Tetsurō Oda	Daisuke Ikeda	4:13
3.	"Wake Up Make The Morning Last ~Wasure Gataki Hito he~" (～忘れがたき人へ～)	Hiroya Fukuyama	Hirohito Furui (Garnet Crow)	3:57
4.	"Brand New Love" (the song was originally performed by Wands)	Masaaki Wanatuki	Tokunaga	5:16
5.	"Unmei no Roulette Mawashite" (運命のルーレット廻して)	Seiichiro Kuribayashi	Ikeda	5:19
6.	"Tooi Hoshi wo Kazoete" (遠い星を数えて)	Kuribayashi	Tokunaga	5:10
7.	"Atarashii Door ~Fuyu no Himawari~" (新しいドア ～冬のひまわり～)	Masato Kitano	Furui	6:05
8.	"Good Day"	Masaaki Watanuki	Ikeda	5:13
9.	"I Feel Fine, Yeah!"	Makoto Miyoshi (Rumania Montevideo)	Furui	3:45
10.	"Shoujo no Koro ni Modotta Mitai ni" (少女の頃に戻ったみたいに)	Aika Ohno	Ikeda	5:42
11.	"Iki mo Dekinai" (息もできない)	Oda	Takeshi Hayama	4:38
12.	"Kaze ga Toori Nukeru Machi he" (風が通り抜ける街へ)	Oda	Tokunaga	4:43
13.	"Photograph" (フォトグラフ)	Tokunaga	Tokunaga	4:03
Total length:				61:48

== Usage in media ==
- Unmei no Roulette Mawashite: opening theme for anime television Detective Conan
- Shoujo no Koro ni Modotta Mitai ni: theme song for movie Detective Conan: The Fourteenth Target
- Kaze ga Toori Nukeru Machi he: commercial song of Japan Racing Association
- Eien: theme song for drama A Lost Paradise
- My Baby Grand ~Nukumori ga Hoshikute~: commercial song of NTT DoCoMo
- Iki mo Dekinai: 2nd opening theme for Anime television Chūka Ichiban!
- Atarashii Door ~Fuyu no Hajimari~: commercial song of Sapporo Brewery
- Good Day: commercial song of company "Hoyu Co."
- I feel fine, yeah: theme song for Fuji TV program "Mezamashi Tenki"

== Charts ==
Year	Chart	Position	First week sales	Annual sales	Total sales	Yearly position
1999	Japanese Oricon Weekly Albums Chart	1	613,130	1,149,300	1,149,913	19
