= Grass Arcade =

Japanese rock band

- Also known as: Grass Arc.
- Origin: Japan
- Genres: Rock, pop rock
- Years active: 1998–1999
- Labels: Garage Indies Zapping Association (1999); Giza Studio (1999)
- Past members: Seri Kamimine; Kouji Ueno; Hiroyuki Wakita; Keishi Sanada
- Website: Official Website

Grass Arcade was a Japanese rock-band under the Giza Studio label and were active in 1998/1999. Their management office was Ading.

== History ==
The band was formed in 1998, when Seri Kamimine and Keishi Sanada were high school classmates. Later on in the summer of 1998, Kouji Ueno joined and the three then performed together, live on the streets.

In February 1999, they made their major debut on the same day as Giza Studio artists Sweet Velvet and New Cinema Tokage. Their debut single was Brave which was released in two formats: 8cm and 12cm maxi single. The single was used as the 4th opening theme for Anime television series Kindaichi Shounen no Jikenbo. The single reached number 36 in the Weekly Oricon rankings, charted for 2 weeks and sold over 10,000 copies.

In the same month they released their first mini album "!" under the indie label, Garage Indies Zapping Association. The mini album includes the demo version of the single Brave, the b-side track So Long and two cover songs by the bands Happy End and The Spiders.

In June 1999, they released their second and final single, Butterfly which was used as a theme song for NNS television program Tokoroteki Dazoku Kousa. Bassist Hiroyuki Wakita then joined shortly afterwards.

In July 1999, there were plans to release a debut album, Sing-a-horic (with the disc code GZCA-1010), however during the recording the band disbanded and as result the album was never released.

In August 1999, Hiroyuki left the band and Grass Arcade then disbanded. Hiroyuki would then join the band New Cinema Tokage as their new bassist in June 2000.

In 2014, when they reached the 15th anniversary of their debut, Seri and Keishi performed under the name Grass Arcade in a live session called QUNIWO☆SONIC in live house Ogimachi Para-dice as guest members of the band Robo&Peace. Ueno and Hiroyuki weren't involved.

== Members ==
- Seri Kamimine (上峰芹) - vocals
- Keishi Sanada (早灘圭志) - drums
- Kouji Ueno (上野幸司) - guitar
- Hiroyuki Wakita (脇田啓行) - bass

== Discography ==
=== Mini albums ===
	Release Day	Title	Rank
1st	1999/10/20	!	UCR-001

=== Singles ===
	Release Day	Title	Rank	CD code
1st	1999/2/10	Brave	36	GZDA-1002
2nd	1999/6/23	Butterfly	-	GZDA-1007

=== Unreleased studio album ===
	Release Day	Title	CD code
1st	1999/7/28	Sing-a-horic	GZCA-1010

== Magazine appearances ==
From Music Freak Magazine:

- Vol.51 1999/February
- Vol.55 1999/June
- Vol.56 1999/July

From J-Rock Magazine:

- 1999/03
- 1999/04
- 1999/08
