= Eien (Zard song) =

Single by Zard

from the album Eien
- Released: August 20, 1997
- Recorded: February–June 1997
- Studio: B.Gram-RECORDS
- Genre: Pop; gospel; rock
- Label: B-Gram Records
- Songwriter(s): Izumi Sakai, Akihito Tokunaga
- Producer(s): Daiko Nagato, ZARD

Zard singles chronology
"'Kaze ga Toori Nukeru Machi he'" (1997)	"Eien" (1997)	"'My Baby Grand ~Nukumori ga Hoshikute~~'" (1997)

"Eien" (永遠, Eternity) is Zard's 22nd single released on August 20, 1997, under B-Gram Records label. Junichi Watanabe, the writer of the novel, wrote the title word "Eien" of the CD cover. The single reached rank number 1 first week. It charted for 13 weeks and sold 628,000 copies. When Izumi Sakai died in 2007, it was selected as her fifth best song on the Oricon polls.

== Track listing ==
All lyrics are written by Izumi Sakai

No.	Title	Music	Arrangers	Length
1.	"Eien" (永遠)	Akihito Tokunaga	Akihito Tokunaga	3:51
2.	"I can't let go"	Seiichiro Kuribayashi	Hirohito Furui	4:26
3.	"Eien" (Original Karaoke)			3:50
4.	"I can't let go" (Original Karaoke)			4:25

== Usage in media ==
- Eien:the song was used as the theme song of Japanese television drama adaptation of the novel A Lost Paradise
