= Yumi Shizukusa =

Japanese R&B and pop singer (born 1984)

Yumi Shizukusa 滴草 由実
- Born: 滴草 由実; July 9, 1984 (age 42)
- Origin: Kagoshima Prefecture, Japan
- Genres: J-pop, R&B, rock, soul
- Occupations: Singer-songwriter, actress, illustrater
- Instruments: Vocals, piano
- Years active: 2002–2021
- Labels: Giza Studio, Styling Records, Zain Records, Northern Music
- Website: yumi-shizukusa.com

Yumi Shizukusa (滴草 由実, Shizukusa Yumi; born on July 9, 1984) is a former Japanese singer, songwriter and artist. Born and raised in Kagoshima, she relocated to Osaka in 2002 after winning the Super Starlight Audition and signing a recording contract with Being. In July 2002, Shizukusa appeared in the compilation album Giza Studio Mai-k & Friends Hotrod Beach Party alongside the other Being artists including Mai Kuraki, Rina Aiuchi, and Yuri Nakamura. Her breakthrough came in early 2003 after appearing Day Track's song "Don't Say Don't Love", which topped the Usen chart.

== History ==
=== 2002–2003: Audition and success ===
In April 2002, she won the 1st place on the audition called "Super Starlight Contest" brought by Giza Studio. After that, she appeared on some compilations like "GIZA studio MAI-K & FRIENDS HOTROD BEACH PARTY" and "DAY TRACK: Lady Mastersoul".

On July 2, 2003, she released her first single "Don't you wanna see me <oh> tonight?". It peaked at No. 35 on the Oricon Singles Chart and gained many radio plays.

On December 3, her debut studio album "CONTROL Your touch" was released.

=== 2004: "Yumi Shizukusa II" ===
On April 14, she released the lead single from her 2nd album "Yumi Shizukusa II", "Kokoro wa itsumo Rainbow Color". It achieved weak success, charting at No. 84 on the Oricon Singles Chart.

On October 27, 2004, she released her second studio album "Yumi Shizukusa II". It includes "I'm in Love" featuring Wyclef Jean.

=== 2005–2006: Comeback in popularity and "Hana kagari" ===
On February 9, 2005, she released her 6th single "Hana kagari". It was used in Japanese famous TV mystery drama "Kyoto Chiken no Onna" and gained many airplays.

On December 15, 2005, she released her 1st digital single "Communication break out" on iTunes. It peaked at No. 1 on the iTunes Chart.

On March 1, 2006, her third studio album "Hana Kagari" was released.

=== 2007–2010: "I still believe" and duet with KG ===
On May 30, 2007, she released her 8th single "I still believe: Tameiki". It was used in one of the most popular Japanese anime Case Closed and peaked at No. 50 on the Oricon Singles Chart.

On October 29, she released 10th single "GO YOUR OWN WAY". It performed moderate success with the usage in Case Closed.

Her 4th studio album "THE PAINTED SOUL" was released on December 3, 2008.

On August 19, 2009, she released her first extended play "ENDLESS SUMMER". It peaked at No. 1 on the iTunes R&B Albums Chart.

On February 24, she appeared on KG's album "Love for you" and sang "Kanawanai Koi demo" with him. This song gained moderate success on iTunes.

After that, she went silent about for 3 years.

=== 2013–2014: Comeback in the music scene ===
Her 5th studio album "A woman's heart" was released on December 18, 2013. It achieved weak success though it was praised from critics.

On June 11, she released her first compilation album "#10-story: best of Yumi Shizukusa". It includes two new songs.

=== 2015–2017: "BLUE" and "Rouge" ===
On July 22, 2015, she released her 6th studio album "BLUE", which was acclaimed by critics. It includes the song "Everytime", which was produced by a Grammy-nominated producer starRo. On Marc 22, 2017 she released her 7th studio album "Rouge".

=== 2018-2021: First Art Exhibition and Retirement ===
On July 31, 2018, she provided music Wanna Be Loved for the image movie of the women's luxury brand "Elza Winkler". The song is available only through the official SoundCloud profile.

In October 2019, two paintings were officially exhibited at the art festival "Salon Art Shopping Paris" held at the Carrousel du Louvre in the Louvre Museum in Paris, France.

In November 2020, she held first YouTube live stream Atelier Music Room on the Being Inc.'s Official YouTube channel.

In March 2021, her name disappeared from the Being's official website and her paintings were no longer available for the sale on the Being's portal site. On the same year in December, Shizuku announced through her instagram profile about not renewing contract with agency and retired as a singer, however in future claims to be active as a painting artist only. In July 2023, she posted on her instagram photo of giving a birth to a child.

== Discography ==
=== Studio albums ===
List of albums, with selected chart positions
Title	Album details	Peak chart positions	Sales (JPN)
Title	Album details	JPN	Sales (JPN)
CONTROL Your touch	Release date: December 3, 2003; Label: GIZA studio, Styling Records; Format: CD, Digital download	97	4,516
Yumi Shizukusa II	Release date: October 27, 2004; Label: GIZA studio, Styling Records; Format: CD, Digital download	83	3,856
Hana Kagari	Release date: March 1, 2006; Label: Zain Records; Format: CD, Digital download	131	1,549
The Painted Soul	Release date: December 3, 2008; Label: Northern Music; Format: CD, Digital download	191	964
A woman's heart	Release date: December 18, 2013; Label: Northern Music; Format: CD, Digital download	—	
Blue	Release date: July 22, 2015; Label: Northern Music; Format: CD, Digital download	—	
Rouge	Release date: March 22, 2017; Label: Northern Music; Format: CD, Digital download	—	

=== Extended plays ===
List of albums, with selected chart positions
Title	Album details	Peak chart positions
Title	Album details	JPN
Shiz-tic Covers	Release date: September 24, 2008; Label: Northern Music; Format: Digital download	—
Endless Summer	Release date: August 19, 2009; Label: Northern Music; Format: CD, Digital download	295
A Limited Edition of Yumi Shizukusa	Release date: August 23, 2014; Label: Northern Music; Format: CD	—
Limited Remixes	Release date: May 27, 2015; Label: Brad Music; Format: Vinyl	—
Wildfire	Release date: January 26, 2019; Label: Northern Music; Format: CD	—
Darkwater	Release date: January 26, 2019; Label: Northern Music; Format: CD	—
Maze	Release date: July 14, 2019; Label: Northern Music; Format: CD	—
Found	Release date: July 14, 2019; Label: Northern Music; Format: CD	—

=== Compilation albums ===
List of albums, with selected chart positions
Title	Album details	Peak chart positions
Title	Album details	JPN
#10-story: Best of Yumi Shizukusa	Release date: June 11, 2014; Label: Northern Music; Format: CD, Digital download	225

=== Singles ===
List of singles as lead artist, with selected chart positions, showing year released and album name
Title	Year	Peak chart positions	Sales (JPN)	Album
Title	Year	JPN	Sales (JPN)	Album
"Don't You Wanna See Me (Oh) Tonight?"	2003	35	9,613	CONTROL Your touch
"Take Me Take Me"	2003	72	2,485	CONTROL Your touch
"Control Your Touch"	2003	122	1,031	CONTROL Your touch
"Kokoro wa Itsumo Rainbow Color"	2004	84	1,149	Yumi Shizukusa II
"Missing You"	2004	132	1,267	Yumi Shizukusa II
"Hana Kagari"	2005	70	4,568	Hana Kagari
"Communication Break Out"	2005	—		Non-album single
"Kimi no Namida wo Muda ni shitaku nai"	2006	151	522	Hana Kagari
"I Still Believe: Tameiki"	2007	50	4,687	The Painted Soul
"Calling Me"	2008	169	417	The Painted Soul
"Go Your Own Way"	2008	77	1,580	The Painted Soul
"Katachi Aru Mono"	2009	—		Non-album singles
"Arigatou, Zutto"	2010	—		Non-album singles
"Someday: Watashi wo Wasurete"	2010	—		Non-album singles
"Sakura no Nukumori"	2014	—		#10-story: Best of Yumi Shizukusa

=== Guest appearances ===
List of non-single guest appearances, showing other artist(s), year released and album name
Title	Year	Other artist(s)	Album
"California Girls"	2002	Various artists	GIZA studio Mai-K & Friends Hot Rod Beach Party
"Don't Say Don't Love"	2003	Various artists	Day Track "Lady Mastersoul"
"Foggy Night"	2003	Tak Matsumoto	The Hit Parade
"Kanawanai Koi demo..."	2010	KG	Love for You
"Snow: tetralogy ～Dark snow"	2014	Ikuro Fujiwara	quatre saisons series: Scenario de la saison –hiver-

== Filmography ==
Television roles
Year	Title	Role	Note
2010	Heart of Gold	Xiaxue	
