= Sweet Velvet =

Japanese pop band

- Origin: Japan
- Genres: Japanese pop
- Years active: 1998–2001
- Labels: Garage Indies Zipping Association (1999); Giza Studio (1998-2001)
- Past members: Mizuki Akimoto (vocals); Shinichi Inoue (Guitar); Ryosuke Shimizu (Drums); Naoyuki Tsukada (Bass)
- Website: http://www.giza.co.jp/sweetvelvet/

Sweet Velvet was a Japanese pop band under Giza Studio label, formed in 1998 and disbanded in 2001.

== Biography ==
In 1998, the band formation began. As inspiration for music production they used French pop from the '60s. The band title Sweet Velvet came from the idea of their vocalist Mizuki having velvety voice.

In 1999, along with bands New Cinema Tokage and Grass Arcade they debuted on 10 February as "Number One Artists" (第1号アーティスト) on newly created Giza Studio label by distributors Being Inc. Their debut major single, I Just Feel So Love Again ~Soba ni Iru Dake de~ was released in double formats: 8 cm and 12 cm maxi single. The song was used as ending theme for the anime television series Mamotte Shugogetten. Later, the original composer of the song, Aika Ohno, self-covered it in her English cover album Shadows of Dreams.

In 1999 June, they released their mini album Sweet Velvet under indie label Garage Indies Zipping Association and single Flame of Love, which was used as ending theme for Anime television series. The ON AIR version differs from single release by key tuning and changed lyrics. With "Flame of Love" in July they made their only TV appearance on the Tokyo Broadcasting System Television music program CDTV. "Flame of Love" was included in 2011 in the compilation album Giza Studio Presents: Girls.

Two months later on August, they released their final single "Lazy Drive", which was used as opening theme for TV Asahi morning news program Yajiuma Wide. On-air version of this song started broadcast since April until December.

In February 2000, they released their first and only studio album I Just Feel So "Sweet" which ranked #100 in Oricon Weekly Charts.

In 2001, they entered into indefinite hiatus without no announcement. Their official website was removed as well.

== Members ==
The band consisted of four members:

- Mizuki Akimoto (秋本 瑞月, Akimoto Mizuki) - vocalist and lyricist
- Shinichi Inoue (井上 慎一, Inoue Shinichi) - guitarist
- Ryōsuke Shimizu (清水 亮祐, Shimizu Ryōsuke) - drummer
- Naoyuki Tsukada (塚田 直幸, Tsukada Naoyuki) - keyboardist, bassist, backing vocals, synthesizer

== Discography ==
During their career they've released 1 studio, 1 indies album and 3 singles.

=== Singles ===
	Release Day	Title	Peak
1st	February 10, 1999	I Just Feel So Love Again ~Soba ni Iru Dake de~ (～そばにいるだけで～)	25
2nd	June 23, 1999	Flame Of Love	46
3rd	August 23, 1999	Lazy Drive	79

=== Albums ===
	Release Day	Title	Peak
1st	February 26, 2000	I Just Feel So "Sweet"	100

=== Mini albums ===
	Release Day	Title	Code
1st	June 12, 1999	Sweet Velvet	ICR-003

=== Analogue ===
	Release Day	Title	Code
1st	February 16, 1999	SWEETER BABY/SO GOOD	IKR-003

== Television appearance ==
- Count Down TV: Flame of love (1999/07/03)

== Magazine appearances ==
From J-Rock Magazine:

- 1999 September
- 1999 October

From Music Freak Magazine:

- 1999/February Vol.51
- 1999/May Vol.54
- 1999/June Vol.55
- 1999/August Vol.57
- 2000/February Vol.63
