= Atarashii Door ~Fuyu no Himawari~ =

Single by Zard

from the album Eien
- Released: December 2, 1998
- Genre: Pop rock
- Label: B-Gram Records
- Composer: Masato Kitano
- Lyricist: Izumi Sakai
- Producer: Daiko Nagato

Zard singles chronology
"Unmei no Roulette Mawashite" (1998)	"Atarashii Door ~Fuyu no Himawari~" (1998)	"Good Day" (1998)

"Atarashii Door ~Fuyu no Himawari~ (新しいドア 〜冬のひまわり〜)" is the 26th single by Zard and was released 2 December 1998 under B-Gram Records label. It was released on the same day as the upcoming 27th single, Good Day. The single debuted at #3 rank first week. It charted for 8 weeks and sold over 205,000 copies.

== Track list ==
All songs are written by Izumi Sakai.

1. Atarashii Door ~Fuyu no Himawari~ (新しいドア 〜冬のひまわり〜)
  - composer: Masato Kitano/arrangement: Hirohito Furui
2. Atarashii Door ~Fuyu no Himawari~ (新しいドア 〜冬のひまわり〜) (original karaoke)
