= Rumania Montevideo =

Japanese pop band

- Also known as: MonteVi (モンテビ)
- Origin: Japan
- Genres: J-pop, rock, country
- Instruments: Acoustic guitar Electronic guitar Bass; Drums; Tambourine; Saxophone; Keyboard
- Years active: 1998–2002, 2019–
- Labels: Garage Indies Zapping Association (1998–1999); Giza Studio (1999–2002), Friendship. (2024-)
- Spinoffs: Ramjet Pulley
- Members: Mami Miyoshi; Makoto Miyoshi; Kazunobu Mashima
- Past members: Akiko Matsuda; Satomi Makoshi
- Website: http://www.giza.co.jp/rumania/

Rumania Montevideo is a Japanese pop band under the Giza Studio label. They were active from 1998 to 2002 and reformed in 2019. The band name comes from the combination of the Latin spelling of Romania and Montevideo, the capital of Uruguay.

== Members ==
- Mami Miyoshi (三好真美): vocalist, drummer, lyricist (1998–2002, 2019–)
- Makoto Miyoshi (三好誠): guitarist, composer, arranger (1998–2002, 2019–)
- Akiko Matsuda (松田明子): saxophonist, keyboardist (1998–2002)
- Satomi Makoshi (麻越さとみ): bassist (1998–2002)
- Kazunobu Mashima (間島和伸): guitarist (1998–2002, 2024–2025)

== History ==
=== 1998: Band formation and first demo tapes ===
In the autumn of 1998, the Miyoshi siblings, Mami and Makoto, sent a demo tape to Giza Studio and formed their own band, with members Akiko Matsuda, Satomi Makoshi and Kazunobu Mashima joining in later. During that time, they started recording their first mini album Jet Plane.

In December they released limited two-cassette tapes Half Moon and Picnic, sold at the store Time Bomb in Shinsaibashi for one week.

=== 1999: Success of debut single "Still for your love" ===
On 25 January 1999, the on-air version of their debut single, "Still for your love", aired as an ending theme for the anime television series Detective Conan.

In February, the Miyoshi siblings participated in the recording of the album Eien by the Japanese group Zard. Mami provided backing vocals and Makoto composed the song "I Feel Fine, Yeah".

On 5 March 1999, they released two LP records, Half Moon and Picnic. At the same time, the first mini album Jet Plane was released under indie label Garage Indies Zapping Association. On 29 March they released a second mini studio album Sunny,Cloudy,Rain.

On 14 April 1999, they made a major debut with the single "Still for your love". The single ranked #9 in its first week in the Oricon rankings. On 28 April, they released their third LP record Still for your love. Side A contains the same music as the debut single and side B includes a demo tape of the song "Still for your love" and the solo song "Headphones" by Makoto Miyoshi. The LP record Still for your love was released on April 24, including an original version of the song from the single and demo-tape version, with singing in English and guitar acoustic arrangement. The LP also includes Makoto's unreleased solo track "Headphones".

On 27 May, they made an appearance on the music program Music Station as the first Giza Studio artist. During an interview with Tamori, Makoto explained the meaning behind the name of the band.

On 16 June 1999, they released their studio album Rumaniamania. The album ranked #9 in its first week in the Oricon rankings.

On 24 July 1999, the on-air version of "Digital Music Power" aired as an ending theme for the anime television series Monster Rancher. The original release schedule was planned sometime in August, but it was postponed due to production issues.

In September they released their second single "Digital Music Power". The lyrics were completely changed from the on-air version.

On 3 November 1999, they released their third single "Picnic". The song is performed in Japanese, unlike the version of "Picnic" which was released as a cassette and the LP record Picnic which were originally performed in English. The on-air version of this single started broadcast three days after its release, on 6 November 1999. It aired as an opening theme for the anime television series Monster Rancher.

=== 2000: Sales decline and first stage performances ===
On January 10, they released their fourth single "Koisuru Betty". It aired as a theme song for the TBS television program Express. On January 26, they released their second studio album Girl, Girl, Boy, Girl, Boy.

In July, the Miyoshi siblings, without the other members, held an acoustic live performance "UNDOWN vol.4" as part of the live session at Shibuya Club Quattro. They performed four songs from indie albums and one song from Rumaniamania. This was their first and last live performance.

In August, they released their fifth single "Start All Over Again". It was aired as an ending theme for the TV Asahi program Mokugeki Dokyun! It was their final single which ranked on Oricon Weekly charts.

On 18 November, three members of the band, Matsuda, Makoshi and Mashima, formed the new alternative band Ramjet Pulley and released a major single "Hello...good bye".

=== 2001–2002: Unannounced disband and hiatus ===
In April 2001, after more than half a year, they released their sixth single "Hard Rain". In the media it was promoted as an ending theme for the Tokyo Broadcasting System Television program Kinniku Banzuke. The single was included in the compilation album Giza Studio Masterpiece Blend 2001.

In December 2001, they released their final single "Tender Rain". In the media it was promoted as an ending theme for the Tokyo Broadcasting System Television program CDTV. Both of these singles failed to debut on the Oricon Weekly Singles Chart. In the same month, Mami Miyoshi and Matsuda participated in the R&B cover album Giza Studio R&B Respect Vol.1: Six Sisters Selection covering "Killing Me Softly with His Song" by Lori Lieberman and "Free" by Deniece Williams.

In February 2002, after the release of the third studio album Mo' Better Tracks their activities stopped. It is not known whether they disbanded or took a hiatus as no public announcement was published on their official website.

=== 2003–2007: Separate activities ===
In May 2003, Mami Miyoshi appeared as a guest singer at Hills Pan Kōjō at Keiko Utoku's event "Oldies Night" performing a cover of Gazebo's "I Like Chopin". Later, she composed the album track "Ikitakuwanai Bokura" for Japanese singer Azumi Uehara. She was active until 2006.

Makoto Miyoshi continued writing songs for various Giza artists such as The Tambourines, Uura Saeka, Aiko Kitahara and U-ka Saegusa. He officially left Giza Studio in 2007.

The alternative band Ramjet Pulley also unofficially disbanded and went into indefinite hiatus in autumn 2003.

Makoshi quit public activity in January 2003 after releasing the final album of Ramjet Pulley.

Mashima represented himself in production credits as both a former Rumania Montevideo and Ramjet Pulley member. He continued writing songs for various Giza artists such as Aiko Kitahara and U-ka Saegusa in dB as composer and arranger until 2007.

In June 2003, Matsuda appeared at Hill Pankoujou's Thursday Live: Acoustic Night as a guest singer. In August, she released a cover of Yumi Arai's "Ame no Machi wo", which was arranged and produced by Tak Matsumoto, the song was included as a B-side of the cover of "Ihoujin" by Zard. After September 2003, she quit public activity.

In 2006, Rina Aiuchi and Saegusa Yuuka covered "Still for your love", which appeared as a B-side to their single "100 Mono Tobira" with re-arrangement by Takeshi Hayama.

=== 2019: Band reunion and cancelled live tour ===
On 6 March 2019, Makoto Miyoshi launched an official X (Formerly Twitter) account with the announcement of a return to band activities along with his sister Mami Miyoshi. Later Makototo announced that Mami would provide only vocals, not drums. On 7 March, Makoto shared on his YouTube channel a demo tape of the unreleased song "anytime" with Makoto as lead vocalist and Mami doing background vocals. The original upload of a demo tape is from 2011. On the same day it was announced on X (Formerly Twitter) that Naoya Shimai from indie band Spaghetti Vabune! would support the group on drums.

On 15 March, "Tom" was announced on X (Formerly Twitter) as the new bass player to the band.

On 1 April, a practice video of the song "Dare mo Shiranai Yoake" was uploaded on Makoto Miyoshi's X (Formerly Twitter) account. The video footage shows two guitarists, one bassist, one drummer and vocalist Mami Miyoshi.

On 8 July a new keyboard and backing vocals support member, "Cherry", and a guitar support member, "Rerere", were announced through X (Formerly Twitter). The new band consisted of former members, the Miyoshi siblings and four new support members. On 14 July, Mami Miyoshi launched a X (Formerly Twitter) account.

On 1 December the band performed live in the Ohsaka venue Hills Pankoujou. Former members of the sub-band Ramjet Pulley arrived as audience guests as well.

In January 2020, Makoto published three interview videos on his YouTube channel with guitarist Shimal, who answered questions about Rumania Montevideo's past. In February, Makoto started launching short demo tapes on his YouTube channel. In March, a second reunion live performance was scheduled in Tokyo in the venue Daikanyama Unit. All supporting band members planned to reprise their roles., however on 9 March, the event was cancelled due to the worldwide pandemic situation of the coronavirus. After the conclusion, Mami's activities has been decreased and Miyoshi continues release monthly new song or demo tapes on his YouTube channel.

On 20 August 2020, Makoto has confessed his wish to collaborate once again in the band with his childhood friend and former member, Kazunobu Mashima.

=== 2024-2025: New album "Flex" and live tour "Reborn" ===
On 10 April, Makoto has announced through his X (Formerly Twitter) account that new album Flex is in the production. On 20 November, promotional single "snow loop" has been distributed on the music streaming platforms. The album is scheduled to release only through live venue in 2025 during their live tour "rumania montevideo REBORN2025".

== Discography ==
During their career, the band released three studio albums, two indie albums, three LP records, two cassette tapes, and seven singles.

All lyrics were written by Mami Miyoshi, and all music was composed and arranged by Makoto Miyoshi.

=== Singles ===
	Release date	Title	Rank	CD code
1st	1999/4/14	Still for your love	9	GZDA-1004
2nd	1999/9/15	Digital Music Power	29	GZDA-1011
3rd	1999/11/3	picnic	60	GZCA-1016
4th	2000/1/10	Koisuru Betty (恋するベティー)	83	GZCA-1019
5th	2000/8/23	Start All Over Again	67	GZCA-1025
6th	2001/4/25	Hard rain	-	GZCA-1070
7th	2001/12/12	Tender Rain	-	GZCA-2024

=== Promotional single ===
	Release date	Title
1st	2024/11/20	Snow loop
2nd	2024/12/25	Smile again

=== Studio albums ===
	Release date	Title	Rank	CD code
1st	1999/6/16	Rumaniamania	9	GZCA-1007
2nd	2000/1/26	Girl, Girl, Boy, Girl, Boy	24	GZCA-1017
3rd	2002/2/6	Mo' Better Tracks	49	GZCA-5009
4th	2024/1	Flex		HKHR-0001

=== Indie albums ===
	Release date	Title	CD code
1st	1999/1/30 1999/3/5 (re-print)	Jet Plane	ICR-2
2nd	1999/3/29 1999/4/14 (re-print)	Sunny,Cloudy,Rain	ICR-4

=== Cassette tapes ===
	Release date	Title	CD code
1st	1998/12/30	Picnic	ICT-001
1st	1998/12/30	Half Moon	ICT-002

=== LP records ===
	Release date	Title	CD code
1st	1999/3/5	Picnic	IKR-004
2nd	1999/3/5	Half Moon	IKR-005
3rd	1999/4/28	Still for your love	IJR-001

== Demo tapes ==
The titles come from the official YouTube channel of Makoto Miyoshi.

- Anytime (March 2011) - Makoto lead vocals, Mami back-vocals
- 0208 (August 2019)
- Unknown (September 2019)
- Sunset (January 2020)
- Dance (February 2020)
- Smile Again (February 2020) - Mami lead vocals
- Opinion No.5 (26 April 2020)
- The Motion (15 May 2020)
- Uroncha(烏龍茶) (17 May 2020)
- Outer Space (28 August 2020)
- aquablue2020 (28 August 2020)
- electro harmonix (28 August 2020)
- Catch Up (28 August 2020) - Mami lead vocals
- Obrien (28 August 2020)
- Barcelona (28 August 2020)
- Fade Away (28 August 2020)
- Gravity (28 August 2020)
- Anybody Else (6 September 2020)

== Television performances ==
- CDTV
  - Still for your love (1999/04/10)
  - Picnic (1999/11/06)
- Music Station (1999/05/27)
  - Still for your love
- NHK Seishun Message 2000 (2000/01/10)
  - Still for your love, Koisuru Betty
- Pop-Jam
  - Koisuru Betty (2000/01/15)

== Live performances ==
- Shibuya Club Quattro: Undown Vol.4 (14 July 2000) - stage appearance of Miyoshi siblings
- Hills Pan Koujou: GIZA studio R&B PARTY (15 December 2001) - only Mami and Akiko
- Hills Pan Koujou: Oldies Night (8 May 2003) - only Mami
- Hills Pan Koujou: Acoustic Night (12 June 2003) - only Akiko
- Hills Pan Koujou: Rumania Montevideo Live 2019: Boku wo Motsu Kimi he (1 December 2019) - Miyoshi siblings with four new support members

== Authority ==
Musicbrainz.org page
