= Wag (band) =

Disbanded Japanese rock music group

- Origin: Japan
- Genres: Rock
- Years active: 1998–2006
- Labels: Garage Indies Zapping Association (1999); Giza Studio (1999-2006)
- Past members: Shinya Hirayama; Yuuji Hirayama; Keisuke Yanagida; Tetsuya Oguro; Kousuke Minami
- Website: http://www.giza.co.jp/wag/ (WebArchive)

Wag was a Japanese rock band under the Giza Studio label, active from 1998 to 2006.

== Members ==
Members consisted of siblings, cousins and their childhood friends.

- Shinya Hirayama (平山進也) - vocalist (born 31 January 1979)
- Yuuji Hirayama (平山裕司) - side guitarist (born 18 October 1980)
- Keisuke Yanagida (柳田圭祐) - leader guitarist (born 16 March 1981)
- Tetsuya Oguro (小黒哲也) - drummer (born 29 November 1978)
- Kousuke Minami (南公祐) - bassist and member of band until 2004 (born 21 May 1977)

== Biography ==
=== 1998-2001 ===
The formation of the band began in autumn 1998 by the Hirayama siblings, later other members joined the band.

In July 1999, under Giza Studio label they released their first single Odyssey. The single was used as an image song for Sanyo's radio recorder U4.

On 3 September 1999, the first mini album Waggish Tricks was released which includes previously released single Odyssey. Minami Kousuke wrote all the lyrics in English for their indie releases.

On 13 September 1999, they launched their fanclub Wag-On with a monthly fanclub magazine Go For it!

On 2 October 1999, they started broadcasting their own radio program Future Paradise Wag-On on Kiss-Fm radio station. On their official site under section Radio section they shared for listeners the complete radio talk and list of power-played songs. The final program was broadcast on 27 December 2003.

On 14 October 1999, they made a major debut with single Free Magic composed by Makoto Miyoshi from Rumania Montevideo and written by Nana Azuki from Garnet Crow. The on-air version of this song was broadcast from 19 July. In media, it was used as an ending theme for popular Anime television series Detective Conan. On the weekly Oricon Charts it reached #33 rank and charted for 3 weeks.

In December 1999, they held a mini-live performance in Saison group Shibuya Club Quattro.

In February 2000, there were plans to release another mini album Ri-Ra (GZCA-1018) however due to unknown reason the release was canceled.

In October 2001, they released their first studio album WAG.

In December 2001, their single Kanashimi no Ame was included in Giza Studio's compilation album Giza Studio Masterpiece Blend 2001.

=== 2002-2006 ===
From September 2002 to March 2003, they held seven Friend Man-three Live events Whisky a Go go! in Osaka Muse Hall.

On 21 December 2002, their single All For Your Love was included in Giza Studio's compilation album Giza Studio Masterpiece Blend 2002. This single was exclusively released for this album, and does not appear in any of their studio albums.

In July 2003, Wag held a live performance Hills Pan Koujou GIZA studio presents THURSDAY LIVE "ROCK NIGHT" with guest Ami Matsunaga from The Tambourines and on October with indies band Elf.

In November 2003, they renewed and changed their website domain from giza.co.jp/wag into wag-net.com.

In December 2003, their single Fight Song was included in Giza Studio's compilation album Giza Studio Masterpiece Blend 2003.

In February 2004, their single Fukisusabu Kaze no Naka de appeared on the Oricon Weekly charts for the first time since 1999. The single was composed by Akihito Tokunaga and written by Yuka Saegusa from U-ka Saegusa in dB. In media it was used as an ending theme for Anime television series Saiyuki Reload.

In March 2004, Kousuke left the band.

In May 2005, the band released their final single Don't look back again. In media, it was used as an opening theme for Anime television series Saiyuki Reload Gunlock.

In November 2005, through official fanclub Wag-On they announced the. band's disbandment on 31 December 2006, a year after their official website was removed by Giza staff.

== Discography ==
=== Indies singles ===
	Release Day	Title	CD Code
1st	1999/07/10	Odyssey	ICR-009

=== Singles ===
	Release Day	Title	Rank	CD code
1st	1999/10/14	Free Magic	33	GZDA-1013
2nd	2000/7/19	Don't Think Twice, It's All Right	X	GZCA-1040
3rd	2001/5/16	Just wanna be	X	GZCA-1075
4th	2001/8/29	Kanashimi no Ame (悲しみの雨)	X	GZCA-2012
5th	2001/11/21	Time Waits For No One	X	GZCA-2021
6th	2002/2/27	All For Your Love	X	GZCA-2029
7th	2002/12/18	Rollin' Man	X	GZCA-7009
8th	2003/5/28	Fight Song	X	GZCA-7017
9th	2003/8/6	Soshite Kyou mo Dokoka de (そして今日も何処かで)	X	GZCA-7028
10th	2004/2/25	Fukisusabu Kaze no Naka de (吹きすさぶ風の中で)	64	GZCA-7041
11th	2004/5/26	Don't look back again	104	GZCA-7052

=== Studio albums ===
	Release Day	Title	Rank	CD code
1st	2001/10/3	WAG	X	GZCA-5004
2nd	2003/11/19	Point Depot	X	GZCA-5039

=== Indies albums ===
	Release Day	Title	CD code
1st	1999/9/3	Waggish Tricks	ICR-010
1st	1999/10/3	Baggot In	ICR-012

== Magazine appearances ==
From Music Freak Magazine:

- Vol.59 1999/October
- Vol.60 1999/November
- Vol.61 1999/December
- Vol.62 2000/January
- Vol.63 2000/February
- Vol.64 2000/March
- Vol.67 2000/June
- Vol.68 2000/July
- Vol.70 2000/September
- Vol.73 2000/December
- Vol.74 2001/January
- Vol.78 2001/May
- Vol.81 2001/August
- Vol.82 2001/September
- Vol.83 2001/October
- Vol.84 2001/November
- Vol.86 2002/January
- Vol.87 2002/February
- Vol.88 2002/March
- Vol.89 2002/April
- Vol.93 2002/August
- Vol.94 2002/September
- Vol.95 2002/October
- Vol.96 2002/November
- Vol.97 2002/December
- Vol.98 2003/January
- Vol.99 2003/February
- Vol.100 2003/March
- Vol.101 2003/April
- Vol.102 2003/May
- Vol.104 2003/July
- Vol.105 2003/August
- Vol.107 2003/October
- Vol.108 2003/November
- Vol.109 2003/December
- Vol.110 2004/January
- Vol.111 2004/February
- Vol.113 2004/April
- Vol.114 2004/May

From J-Rock Magazine:

- 1999/08
- 1999/09
- 1999/11
- 1999/12
- 2000/01
- 2000/03
- 2000/05
- 2000/06
- 2000/07
- 2000/08

From Digital Creators DGCR

- Vol.5
- Vol.10
- Vol.13
- Vol.15
- Vol.16
- Vol.19

From J-Groove Magazine:

- November 2000 Vol.1
- June 2001 Vol.8
- September 2001 Vol.11
- November 2001 Vol.13
- April 2002 Vol.18
- January 2003 Vol.27
- February 2003 Vol.28
- July 2003 Vol.33
- September 2003 Vol.35
