= Monster Rancher (TV series) =

Japanese anime television series

- North American DVD cover of the first season

モンスターファーム (Monsutā Fāmu)
- Anime television series
- Directed by: Hiroyuki Yano
- Produced by: Kazuhiko Yagiuchi; Naotsugu Kato; Tetsuya Watanabe
- Written by: Shōji Yonemura
- Music by: Seiji Suzuki; BMF
- Studio: TMS Entertainment (Note: Credited as TMS-Kyokuichi on season 1)
- Licensed by: EU: BKN International; NA: BKN, Inc. (former); ADV Films (former); Discotek Media
- Original network: JNN (CBC, TBS)
- English network: CA: YTV; US: Syndication (Bohbot Kids Network), Fox Kids, Sci-Fi Channel, Fox Family
- Original run: April 17, 1999 – September 30, 2000
- Episodes: 73
- icon

Monster Rancher, known in Japan as Monster Farm (モンスターファーム, Monsutā Fāmu), is a Japanese anime television series based on Tecmo's Monster Rancher video game franchise. It originally aired on CBC in Japan for two seasons from April 1999 to September 2000. In North America, the series was first licensed by BKN, Inc. and broadcast with an English dub on the Bohbot Kids Network, the Sci-Fi Channel, the Fox Family Channel, and Fox Kids in the United States and YTV in Canada. It was later licensed by Discotek Media in 2013.

== Plot ==
The series follows Genki Sakura (佐倉 ゲンキ, Sakura Genki), who plays the Monster Rancher video games. In the first season, after winning a tournament hosted by the game's creators, Genki wins a CD that unlocks a special monster in the game. However, upon inserting the disk into his game console, he is transported to a world of monsters that, like in the game, are given life by scanning special stone disks within temples. There, he meets a girl named Holly (ホリィ, Horii) and her monster friend Suezo (スエゾー, Suezō), who are searching for a stone disk containing the legendary Phoenix, who will save the land from the tyranny of the evil Moo (ムー, Mū). Upon attempting to use Genki's disk to release the Phoenix, they summon a different monster, who Genki names Mocchi (モッチー, Motchī). In order to free the land from Moo's rule, Genki, Holly, Mocchi, and Suezo set off in search of the Phoenix guided by Holly's Magic Stone; this leads them to meet Golem, Tiger, and Hare, who join them on their journey.

It is revealed that Moo is Holly's missing father, who merged with an evil spirit after being banished from his village. Determined to separate him from Moo, the group continues their search for the Phoenix, defeating Moo's strongest minions, the Big Bad Four—Pixie, Gali, Grey Wolf, and Naga—while helping and befriending monsters by unlocking Mystery Disks in hopes of finding the Phoenix. One of the monsters, Monol, tells them of a previous war between Moo and the Phoenix, part of a larger war between humans and monsters, who exploited monsters as workers and companions in a futuristic society. The war destroyed much of the world and weakened Moo and the Phoenix, sending them into a dormant state and separating their bodies from their souls.

Moo's body is found and merges with Holly's father. Soon after, the Phoenix's body is found and it is revealed that the five monsters—Mocchi, Suezo, Golem, Tiger, and Hare—are fragments of its soul. They say farewell to Genki before merging with the Phoenix's body to revive it and fight Moo; as they fight, Moo realizes that good and evil are inherently inseparable and that they, as representatives of good and evil, are doomed to perpetually fight. They seemingly die and Genki is transported back to the real world in the resulting explosion, comforted by visions of his friends as he returns home.

In the second season, Genki returns to the Monster World to revive his friends, who were turned into disks and separated after the fight with Moo, and competes in a series of tournaments against General Durahan's army in search of Holly's father. In the third season, they fight against Durahan, who has been possessed by Moo's soul. In the Japanese version, in the credits of the final episode, it is revealed that Genki and Mocchi are able to travel between the Monster Rancher world and Earth.

== Episodes ==
Season	Title	Episodes	Originally released		
Season	Title	Episodes	First released	Last released	Network
1	The Secret of the Stone Disk	48	April 17, 1999	March 25, 2000	TBS
2	The Legendary Path	25	April 1, 2000	September 30, 2000	TBS

=== Season 1: The Secret of the Stone Disk ===
No. overall	No. in season	Ocean's dub title/Translated title Original Japanese title	Original release date	English air date
1	1	"In the Beginning" / "The Beginning Is Now!"; Transliteration: "Hajimari wa ima!" (Japanese: はじまりは今!)	April 17, 1999	August 30, 1999
2	2	"I'm Mocchi!"; Transliteration: "Boku Mocchi" (Japanese: ぼくモッチー!)	April 24, 1999	August 30, 1999
3	3	"Guardian of the Disks" / "The Monster's Forest"; Transliteration: "Kaibutsu no mori" (Japanese: 怪物の森)	May 1, 1999	September 1, 1999
4	4	"Eternal Worm"; Transliteration: "Eien no Wamu" (Japanese: 永遠のワーム)	May 8, 1999	September 6, 1999
5	5	"Tiger of the Wind" / "Rygar of the Wind"; Transliteration: "Kaze no Raiga" (Japanese: 疾風のライガー)	May 15, 1999	September 8, 1999
6	6	"Hare's Trick" / "I Am Ham"; Transliteration: "Wagahai wa Hamu dearu" (Japanese: 我が輩はハムである)	May 22, 1999	September 14, 1999
7	7	"The Courageous Seven" / "Courage of the Seven"; Transliteration: "Shichinen no yuki" (Japanese: 七人の勇気)	May 29, 1999	September 22, 1999
8	8	"After the Rain"; Transliteration: "Ameagari no sora ni" (Japanese: 雨上がりの空に)	June 5, 1999	September 23, 1999
9	9	"The Iron Bird" / "Fly, Iron Bird!"; Transliteration: "Tobe! Aian baado" (Japanese: 飛べ！アイアンバード)	June 12, 1999	September 29, 1999
10	10	"The Ruins' Secret" / "Icy Pixie"; Transliteration: "Koori no pikushii" (Japanese: 氷のピクシー)	June 19, 1999	September 30, 1999
11	11	"Pixie's Defeat" / "Decisive Battle! Monster Battle"; Transliteration: "Kessen! Monsutaa batoru" (Japanese: 決戦！モンスターバトル)	June 26, 1999	October 6, 1999
12	12	"Monol's Story" / "Thus Spake Monolith"; Transliteration: "Mono risu kaku katari ki" (Japanese: モノリスかく語りき)	July 3, 1999	October 12, 1999
13	13	"Moo Revealed" / "Moo Descends!"; Transliteration: "Mū Koorin!" (Japanese: ムー降臨！)	July 10, 1999	October 18, 1999
14	14	"Holly's Rescue" / "Evil Soul"; Transliteration: "Jaaku na tamashii" (Japanese: 邪悪な魂)	July 17, 1999	November 1, 1999
15	15	"A New Departure"; Transliteration: "Arata naru tabidachi" (Japanese: 新たなる旅立ち)	July 24, 1999	November 3, 1999
16	16	"Great Battle at Sea"; Transliteration: "Umi no dai kessen" (Japanese: 海の大決戦)	July 31, 1999	November 10, 1999
17	17	"Underground Adventure" / "Ham! Come Back"; Transliteration: "Hamu! Kan bakku" (Japanese: ハム！カンバック)	August 7, 1999	November 16, 1999
18	18	"Our Friend Henger Forever" / "Henger, forever" Transliteration: "Hengaa yo, eien ni" (Japanese: ヘンガーよ、永遠に)	August 14, 1999	November 17, 1999
19	19	"Suezo's Secret Weapon" / "Appeared!? Suezo's New Deathblow Technique"; Transliteration: "Deru ka!? Suezoo no shin hissatsu waza" (Japanese: 出るか!?スエゾーの新必殺技)	August 21, 1999	November 18, 1999
20	20	"My Name Is Pixie"; Transliteration: "Waga na wa Pikushii" (Japanese: 我が名はピクシー)	August 28, 1999	November 22, 1999
21	21	"The Mocchi Cannon" / "Exploding Mocchi Cannon"; Transliteration: "Bakuretsu!? Mocchi hoo!" (Japanese: 爆裂!?モッチ砲！)	September 4, 1999	November 23, 1999
22	22	"Run, Tiger, Run!" / "Run, Rygar!"; Transliteration: "Hashire Raigaa!" (Japanese: 走れライガー！)	September 18, 1999	November 24, 1999
23	23	"Don't Give Up, Ducken!"; Transliteration: "Ganbare dakkun!" (Japanese: がんばれダックン！)	September 25, 1999	November 29, 1999
24	24	"Undine's Lake"; Transliteration: "Undiine no Mizuumi" (Japanese: ウンディーネの湖)	October 2, 1999	November 30, 1999
25	25	"Warriors of the Ruins" / "Warriors of the Castle Ruins"; Transliteration: "Haikyo no senshi tachi" (Japanese: 廃墟の戦士たち)	October 9, 1999	December 1, 1999
26	26	"Melcarba" / "Berserk Warrior Merkava"; Transliteration: "Boosoo senshi merukaaba" (Japanese: 暴走戦士メルカーバ)	October 16, 1999	December 2, 1999
27	27	"Tiger's Battle with Destiny" / "Rygar! Fated Confrontation"; Transliteration: "Raigaa! Shukumei no taiketsu" (Japanese: ライガー！宿命の対決)	October 23, 1999	January 30, 2001
28	28	"Color Pandora, Guardian of the Forest" / "Trickster of the Forest, Colopendra"; Transliteration: "Mori no shikake ya Koro Pendora" (Japanese: 森の仕掛け屋コロペンドラ)	October 30, 1999	September 17, 2000
29	29	"Farewell, My Friend" / "Goodbye, My Friend"; Transliteration: "Gubbai! Mai furendo" (Japanese: グッバイ！マイフレンド)	November 6, 1999	September 24, 2000
30	30	"Baby Bossy" / "Baby Boss Is a Live Wire"; Transliteration: "Akachan Bosu wa Genki sha" (Japanese: 赤ちゃんボスは元気者)	November 13, 1999	September 24, 2000
31	31	"Amusement Park Ruins" / "Amusement Park of the Castle Ruins"; Transliteration: "Senjoo no yūen chi" (Japanese: 戦場の遊園地)	November 20, 1999	October 1, 2000
32	32	"Holly's Million Gold Smile" / "Holly's Treasured Item"; Transliteration: "Hori? No hoomotsu" (Japanese: ホリィの宝物)	November 27, 1999	October 1, 2000
33	33	"Battle in the Meadow" / "Duel at Susuki Field"; Transliteration: "Susuki? Hara no Kettoo" (Japanese: すすきヶ原の決闘)	December 4, 1999	October 8, 2000
34	34	"The Town That Disappeared" / "Vanishing into the Wasteland"; Transliteration: "Arano ni kie ta machi" (Japanese: 荒野に消えた街)	December 11, 1999	October 8, 2000
35	35	"Battle with the Big Bad Four" / "Final Decisive Battle with the Four Heavenly Kings!"; Transliteration: "Shitennoo saigo no kessen!" (Japanese: 四天王最後の決戦！)	December 18, 1999	October 15, 2000
36	36	"Eve's Night"; Transliteration: "Ibu no yoru" (Japanese: イブの夜)	December 25, 1999	October 15, 2000
37	37	"Holly's Happy Birthday"; Transliteration: "Hori? No Happii Baasudee" (Japanese: ホリィのハッピーバースデー)	January 8, 2000	October 22, 2000
38	38	"Evil General Durahan's Challenge" / "Demon General Dullahan's Challenge"; Transliteration: "Ma shoogun Derahan no choosen" (Japanese: 魔将軍デュラハンの挑戦)	January 15, 2000	October 22, 2000
39	39	"Goodbye, Baku"; Transliteration: "Sayonara Bakū" (Japanese: さよならバクー)	January 22, 2000	October 29, 2000
40	40	"The Secret of Holly's Magic Stone" / "The Secret of Gaia"; Transliteration: "Gaia no himitsu" (Japanese: ガイアの秘密)	January 29, 2000	October 29, 2000
41	41	"Tiger Meets His Match" / "Rygar's Final Day"; Transliteration: "Raigaa saigo no hi" (Japanese: ライガー最後の日)	February 5, 2000	November 5, 2000
42	42	"The Warriors from Outer Space" / "The Warriors Who Came from Space"; Transliteration: "Uchū kara ki ta senshi tachi" (Japanese: 宇宙から来た戦士たち)	February 12, 2000	November 5, 2000
43	43	"The Sand Assassin, Renocraft" / "The Sand Assassin, Renocraft"; Transliteration: "Suna no shikaku Remakurasuto" (Japanese: 砂の刺客レマクラスト)	February 19, 2000	November 12, 2000
44	44	"Magic Stone Mayhem" / "Fierce Fighting! Gaia Struggle"; Transliteration: "Gekitoo! Gaia soodatsu sen" (Japanese: 激闘！ガイア争奪戦)	February 26, 2000	November 12, 2000
45	45	"The End of Durahan" / "Dullahan Dies at Daybreak"; Transliteration: "Derahan akatsuki ni shisu" (Japanese: デュラハン暁に死す)	March 4, 2000	November 19, 2000
46	46	"Jill's Icy Secret" / "Fighting, Hatred, and..." Transliteration: "Tatakai to nikushimi to" (Japanese: 戦いと憎しみと)	March 11, 2000	November 26, 2000
47	47	"Tears"; Transliteration: "Namida" (Japanese: 涙)	March 18, 2000	February 13, 2001
48	48	"Blue Skies"; Transliteration: "Aozora" (Japanese: 青空)	March 25, 2000	February 16, 2001

=== Season 2: The Legendary Path ===
No. overall	No. in season	Ocean's dub title/Translated title Original Japanese title	Original release date	English air date
49	1	"Return to Monster Rancher" / "The Time the Door Opens"; Transliteration: "Tobira ga hiraku toki" (Japanese: 扉が開くとき)	April 1, 2000	September 13, 2001
50	2	"In Quest of the Legend Cup" / "Aim! Legend Cup"; Transliteration: "Mezase! Rejendo hai" (Japanese: 目指せ！レジェンド杯)	April 15, 2000	September 14, 2001
51	3	"Battle for the Rookie Cup" / "Fierce Fighting! Rookie Cup"; Transliteration: "Gekitoo!! Rūkii hai" (Japanese: 激闘!!ルーキー杯)	April 22, 2000	September 15, 2001
52	4	"Saved by a Hare" / "Muha and Ham Visit!"; Transliteration: "Muhat to Hamu sanjoo!" (Japanese: ムハッとハム参上！)	April 29, 2000	September 16, 2001
53	5	"The Powerful Wondar Brothers" / "Powerful Enemy Karakorum Brothers Exist!?"; Transliteration: "Kyooteki karakorumu kyoodai gen ru!?" (Japanese: 強敵カラコルム兄弟現る!?)	May 6, 2000	September 17, 2001
54	6	"Tiger and the Mandy Cup Challenge" / "Mandy Commemorative Cup Stand! Rygar"; Transliteration: "Mandii kinen hai date! Raigaa!" (Japanese: マンディー記念杯 立て!ライガー！)	May 13, 2000	September 18, 2001
55	7	"Disappearing Hare Line" / "The Bell that tolls for Someone"; Transliteration: "Dare ga tame ni kane wa naru" (Japanese: 誰がために鐘は鳴る)	May 20, 2000	September 19, 2001
56	8	"Lost At Sea: Disappearance of the Mystery Disk" / "Disc Stone that Disappeared in the Sea"; Transliteration: "Umi ni kie ta enban seki" (Japanese: 海に消えた円盤石)	May 27, 2000	September 20, 2001
57	9	"Furred Suezo's M-1 Grand Prix Hero" / "M-1 Grand Prix Ganba! Suezo"; Transliteration: "M-1 guranpuri ganba! Suezoo" (Japanese: M-1グランプリ ガンバ！スエゾー)	June 3, 2000	September 21, 2001
58	10	"All's Fare in Love and Taxis" / "Run! To the Distant Shore"; Transliteration: "Hashire! Haruka naru taigan e" (Japanese: 走れ！遥かなる対岸へ)	June 10, 2000	September 22, 2001
59	11	"Allan's Advice" / "Reunion with Allan"; Transliteration: "Saikai no Aran" (Japanese: 再会のアラン)	June 17, 2000	September 23, 2001
60	12	"Winner's Cup: The Fickle Finger of Fate" / "Winner's Cup: Flaming Brow Hit"; Transliteration: "Winaazu hai en no deko pin" (Japanese: ウィナーズ杯 炎のでこぴん)	June 24, 2000	September 24, 2001
61	13	"Pink Jam to the Rescue" / "Defeated Pink Jam!"; Transliteration: "Makeru na Pinku Jamu!" (Japanese: 負けるなピンクジャム！)	July 1, 2000	September 25, 2001
62	14	"Ghost Encounters of the Pirate Kind" / "Retrieve the Pirate Ship!"; Transliteration: "Kaizoku sen o torikaese!" (Japanese: 海賊船を取り返せ！)	July 8, 2000	September 26, 2001
63	15	"The World Monster Cup: Naga Returns" / "World Monster's Cup: Naga Returns"; Transliteration: "Waarudo monsutaazu hai Naaga futatabi" (Japanese: ワールドモンスターズ杯 ナーガふたたび)	July 15, 2000	September 27, 2001
64	16	"Legend of the Great White Most" / "The Great White Legend"; Transliteration: "Idai naru shiro no densetsu" (Japanese: 偉大なる白の伝説)	July 22, 2000	September 28, 2001
65	17	"Shogun the Mighty" / "The Strongest Warrior, Shogun"; Transliteration: "Saikyoo no senshi Shoogun" (Japanese: 最強の戦士ショーグン)	July 29, 2000	September 29, 2001
66	18	"Brothers, in the Greatest Four" / "Greatest 4: Brothers"; Transliteration: "Gurei tesuto 4 kyoodai" (Japanese: グレイテスト4兄弟)	August 5, 2000	September 30, 2001
67	19	"Golem's Cook-Off" / "Aim for First-Class Chef!"; Transliteration: "Mezase ichiryū shefu!" (Japanese: 目指せ一流シェフ)	August 12, 2000	October 1, 2001
68	20	"Battling Granity" / "The Fight Against Venus"; Transliteration: "Biinasu to no tatakai" (Japanese: ビーナスとの戦い)	August 19, 2000	October 2, 2001
69	21	"Mum Mew Risks it All" / "Mama Nyaa's Dangerous Bet"; Transliteration: "Mama Nyaa no kiken na kake" (Japanese: ママニャーの危険な賭け)	August 26, 2000	October 3, 2001
70	22	"Legend Cup: Mocchi vs. Poritoka"; Transliteration: "Rejendo hai Mocchii VS Poritoka" (Japanese: レジェンド杯 モッチーVSポリトカ)	September 2, 2000	October 4, 2001
71	23	"Legend Cup: Mocchi vs. Most"; Transliteration: "Rejendo hai Mocchii VS Mosuto" (Japanese: レジェンド杯 モッチーVSモスト)	September 16, 2000	October 5, 2001
72	24	"Reunion"; Transliteration: "Saikai" (Japanese: 再会)	September 23, 2000	October 6, 2001
73	25	"The Final Battle"; Transliteration: "Saigo no tatakai" (Japanese: 最後の戦い)	September 30, 2000	October 7, 2001

== Broadcast and release ==
In Japan, under the title Monster Farm, the series was broadcast on TBS for two seasons; the first 48-episode season, The Secret of the Stone Disk (円盤石の秘密, Enbanseki no Himitsu), aired from April 17, 1999, to March 25, 2000; the second 25-episode season, The Legendary Path (伝説への道, Densetsu e no Michi), aired from April 1 to September 30, 2000.

The series was brought to the United States by BKN, with an English dub produced by Ocean Studios. It was also broadcast in the United States on the Sci-Fi Channel and Fox Kids and in Canada on YTV. In the United Kingdom, the series aired on children's Saturday morning show Live & Kicking, with episodes also airing on CBBC (on BBC Two) until April 9, 2001. Repeats of the series continued throughout the year and early February 25, 2002.

ADV Films licensed the home video rights to the series and released its first twelve episodes on four DVDs. In 2005, BKN International A.G. licensed the DVD rights for 73 episodes of Monster Rancher to Digiview Productions; however, only one DVD was released. In 2012, the series was available for streaming on Hulu. Discotek Media licensed the series in 2013, and released it on three English-dubbed DVD box sets in 2014, and a single box set with the original Japanese audio subtitled and uncut on July 28, 2015. Discotek Media later released the series on a Blu-ray Disc set on May 29, 2018.
