= Makoto Miyoshi =

Japanese composer & arranger

Makoto Miyoshi 三好 誠
- Born: Osaka Prefecture, Japan
- Genres: Pop, rock, country
- Occupations: Musician, composer, producer, arranger
- Years active: 1998–2007, 2019-
- Label: Giza Studio
- Website: http://www.giza.co.jp/rumania/

Makoto Miyoshi (三好誠, Miyoshi Makoto) is a Japanese musical composer and arranger. In 1999, he became a member of a rock band Rumania Montevideo. Afterwards, he regularly provided music for other artists from the same recording company, Giza Studio, until 2007. In 2019, through social network, he announced resumption of music activities along with Rumania Montevideo. In 2020, he formed an alternative rock band "Morphing people".

== Biography ==
- He started playing on guitar during his high school days. He worked on making various demo-tapes at home while playing live shows with school band in Osaka, but soon found making music to be his main interest.
- His early works were associated with Miho Komatsu and Zard as supportive musician in roles of guitarist and backing-vocals.
- In 1998 he send demo tape with his older sister Mami (future drummer, vocalist and lyricist in Rumania Montevideo) to Garage Indies Zapping Association and soon released cassette tapes Half Moon and "Picnic". Both of those songs later appeared in first indies album Jet Plane.
- In 1999 he formed his own band Rumania Montevideo along with three more members. He was the main leader, guitarist, arranger and composer of the band. The name of band was his own idea based on his favorite soccer team.
- In 2002, the band suddenly entered into indefinite hiatus.
- After then he continued his music activities with various Giza artist such as The Tambourines, Aiko Kitahara and U-ka Saegusa.
- In 2007 his name as credit personnel appeared in Uura Saeka's single Sha la la ~Ayakashi Tonight~'.
- On 6 March 2019, Makoto launched official twitter account with return announcement of Rumania Montevideo along with his sister Mami. Former members are not involved with band re-formation and four new members were added to the band: Cherry, Rerere, Tom and Shimal.

== List of provided works ==
★album ☆ single/coupling

=== Compositions ===
- WANDS
  - Kyou Nanika no Hazumi de Ikiteiru ☆
- WAG
  - Odyssey ★
  - Free Magic ☆
- Zard
  - I feel fine, yeah! (Eien) ★
  - Reset (Motto Chikaku de Kimi no Yokogao Mitetai) ☆
- Rumania Montevideo
  - Jet Plane ★
  - Sunny, Cloudy, Rain ★
  - Still for your love ☆
  - Rumaniamania ★
  - Digital Music Power ☆
  - Picnic ☆
  - Koisuru Betty ☆
  - Girl, girl, boy, girl, boy ★
  - Start All Over Again ☆
  - Hard Rain ☆
  - Tender Rain ☆
  - Mo' Better Tracks ★
- Chika Yoshida
  - Aishini Kite Hoshii ☆
  - Tsuki ni Inori wo ☆
- The★tambourines
  - Mayonaka ni Kizuita Funny Love ☆
  - Atsui Namida ☆
  - fighting girl (Dizzy Season) ★
  - anyway (Home Again) ★
  - never ever, goodnight and thank you (never ever ~Aki ha Chotto Samishiku~) ☆
  - Aoi Gogo (instant vacation) ★
- Azumi Uehara:
  - Bye Bye My Blue Sky ☆
  - Jinsei Game, Maze (Ikitakunai Bokura) ★
- U-ka Saegusa in dB:
  - Change the life (Whenever I think of you) ☆
  - Watashi ja nai Watashi to Nita Anata ga Aisuru Hito ni (I can't see, I can't feel) ☆
  - Destiny Wind Blows (Kimi to Yakusoku Shita Yasashii Ano Basho made~) ☆
  - Kakegaenai Omoi Kimi ni Todoke (Nemuru Kimi no Yokogao ni Hohoemi wo) ☆
- Hikari Yamaguchi
  - Ureshii Tameiki, Sora (Ureshii Tameiki) ★
- Aiko Kitahara:
  - Ashita Haruka Tooi Umi ni Tadoritsukeru you ni (Piece of Love) ★
  - Tadoritsukeba Itsumo Soko ni Iru (Special Days!!) ☆
  - Omoideni Sukuwaretemo (Message) ☆
- Sparkling Point
  - Mainichi Adventure ☆
- Yumi Shizukusa
  - Wonderful World (I still believe ~Tameiki~) ☆
- Uura Saeka
  - Senaka-goshi no egao (Sha la la ~Ayakashi Tonight~) ☆

=== Arrangements ===
- Aya Kamiki
  - Believe in YOU (Secret Code) ★
- Rina Aiuchi
  - ORANGE★NIGHT (Delight) ☆
- U-ka Saegusa in dB
  - Time goes by (Fall in love) ☆
  - Walking in the wind with you (Everybody Jump) ☆

== Supportive musician ==
- Sweet Velvet
  - I just feel so love again ~Soba ni Iru Dake de~ ☆
- Miho Komatsu
  - Chance, Mirai, Tegotae no Nai Ai, Anata no Rhythm, Namida, Shizukesa Ato, Deep Emotion (Miho Komatsu 2nd: Mirai) ★
  - Boyfriend, Sayonara no Kakera (Miho Komatsu 3rd ~ Everywhere ~) ★
  - Suna no Shiro, Kokyou, Namida Kirari Tobase, I~dare ka... (Miho Komatsu 7 ~prime number~) ★
  - Anata Iro (Miho Komatsu 8 ~a piece of cake~) ★
- The Tambourines
  - Dizzy Season ★
  - Never Ever: Aki wa Chotto Samishiku ☆
- Ai Takaoka
  - You Gone (Acoustic love) ★
