= New Cinema Tokage =

Japanese rock band

- Also known as: CineToka(シネトカ)
- Origin: Japan
- Genres: Alternative rock, indie rock, pop rock
- Years active: 1997–2002
- Labels: Garage Indies Zapping Association (1998–1999); Giza Studio (1999–2002)
- Past members: Motoari Funaki; Yuuichiro Iwai; Keisuke Kurumatani; Hideki Kawagoe; Hiroyuki Wakita
- Website: http://www.giza.co.jp/tokage/ (WebArchive)

New Cinema Tokage (New Cinema 蜥蜴) was a Japanese rock-band under Giza Studio label active in years 1997–2002. Their management office was Ading.

== Members ==
- Motoari Funaki (舩木基有) - vocalist and lyricist
- Yuuichiro Iwai (岩井勇一郎) - composer and guitarist
- Keisuke Kurumatani (車谷啓介) - drummer and lyricist
- Hideki Kawagoe (川越英樹) - bassist in years 1998-2000
- Hiroyuki Wakita (脇田啓行) - bassist in years 2000-2002

== Biography ==
The formation of the band began in 1997, at this time Motoari and Yuuichiro were working on their demo tape.

After Keisuke joined in summer 1998, the members came up with the name New Cinema Tokage. The origin of which comes from the Italian movie Cinema Paradiso which Seiichiro had watched. In October 1998, under Giza Studio indies label, they released their first indies single 360° and debuted as the label's first artist.

By January 1999, they had released their first indies album Smashing the bad!. In February 1999, in collaboration with artists Sweet Velvet and Grass Arcade, the band released the single Smashing the Good Smashing the Bad in double formats: 8 cm and 12 cm maxi-single. The single was used as an image song for PlayStation portable game Monster Rancher 2. Following this, their second single Candy Life secured them their most successful position, 49, in Oricon Weekly charts. It was released on the same day as Rumania Montevideo's debut single Still for your love. In July 1999, their third single "Believe myself" served as a 7th ending theme to the anime television series The Kindaichi Case Files. In September 1999, they released their first major studio album Rail. Two months after this, they held their first one-man live tour Rail: Senro wa Tsuzuku yo dokomademo.

From April–May 2000 they held a national live tour. Soon after, Hideki left the band. In June 2000, the open bassist position was filled by Hiroyuki, a former member of Grass Arcade. Later, in October 2000, Keisuke and Yuuichiro became regular TV personalities of programs So-Hot and HP Kyoto. In February 2001, their fanclub Hooligan was established. In May 2001, their second and final studio album Many Elements and single "Free Bird" were released on the same day. In August 2001, the single "Breath on me" become their last work which was included in Oricon Weekly charts. Both of the singles served as an opening theme for Anime television series Project ARMS. In December 2001, their single "Love Generation" was included in Giza Studio's compilation album Giza Studio Masterpiece Blend 2001. Their final single, "Run", was released in February 2002 and, in August, the band disbanded.

After the disband, Yuuichiro and Keisuke became members of Giza Studio's Japanese pop-rock band U-ka Saegusa in dB who were active in years 2003–2010. Saegusa covered three of their songs: "Pocket" (from second album "Many Elements") in their single Egao de iyouyo released in 2004; "Eighteen" (from first album Rail) in their single Tobitatenai Watashi ni Anata ga Tsubasa wo Kureta and "Candy Life" in their single Kimi no Ai ni Tsutsumarete Itai in 2005.

Since 2012, Keisuke is a member of instrumental band Sensation. Yuuichiro's presence was unknown from 2010 until 2018, however since 2019 he makes regular appearances as a support guitarist in band Sard Underground along with Keisuke. In 2004, Hideki became a member of rock band ELF under Tent House label. Motoari formed solo unit Koora and for a short time in 2005 he was blogging on Japanese service Liverdoor.

== Discography ==
=== Indies singles ===
	Release Day	Title	Rank
1st	1999/10/20	360°	IKR-001
2nd	1999/11/20	PUMPKIN HEAD	IKR-002
3rd	1999/03/10	Smashing the good! Smashing the bad!	IKR-006

=== Singles ===
	Release Day	Title	Rank	CD code
1st	1999/2/14	Smashing the good! Smashing the bad!	92	GZDA-1001
2nd	1999/4/14	Candy Life	49	GZCA-1004
3rd	1999/7/7	Believe myself	50	GZDA-1009
4th	1999/9/1	Ghost Mind	96	GZCA-1012
5th	2000/3/23	Messenger	X	GZDA-1014
6th	2000/10/18	Mystery world	X	GZCA-1048
7th	2001/1/24	Lovely Generation: goes&fights	X	GZCA-1058
8th	2001/3/21	Green Love	X	GZCA-1065
9th	2001/05/16	Free Bird	64	GZCA-1074
10th	2001/08/29	Breathe On Me	84	GZCA-2008
11th	2002/02/20	Run	X	GZCA-2032

=== Studio albums ===
	Release Day	Title	Rank	CD code
1st	1999/10/16	Rail	56	GZCA-1013
2nd	2001/5/16	Many Elements	X	GZCA-1073

=== Indies albums ===
	Release Day	Title	CD code
1st	1999/1/27	Smashing the bad!	ICR-1

=== Other appearances ===
List of non-studio album or guest appearances that feature New Cinema Tokage
Title	Year	Artist	Album/Single
"Lovely Generation: Goes&fights"	2001	V.A	Giza Studio Masterpiece Blend 2001

== Magazine appearances ==
From Music Freak Magazine:

- Vol.51 1999/February
- Vol.52 1999/March
- Vol.53 1999/March
- Vol.56 1999/July
- Vol.57 1999/August
- Vol.58 1999/September
- Vol.59 1999/October
- Vol.60 1999/November
- Vol.61 1999/December
- Vol.62 2000/January
- Vol.64 2000/March
- Vol.65 2000/April
- Vol.70 2000/September
- Vol.71 2000/October
- Vol.72 2000/November
- Vol.73 2000/December
- Vol.74 2001/January
- Vol.76 2001/March
- Vol.78 2001/May
- Vol.80 2001/July
- Vol.81 2001/August
- Vol.83 2001/October
- Vol.86 2001/October
- Vol.87 2001/October

From J-Rock Magazine:

- 1999/02
- 1999/03
- 1999/04
- 1999/06
- 1999/08
- 1999/10
- 1999/11
- 1999/12
- 2000/03
- 2000/04

From Digital Creators DGCR:

- Vol.3
- Vol.6
- Vol.7
- Vol.8
- Vol.10
- Vol.13

From J-Groove Magazine:

- December 2000 Vol.2
- February 2001 Vol.4
- May 2001 Vol.7
- June 2001 Vol.8
- October 2001 Vol.12
- April 2002 Vol.18

== Authority ==
Musicbrainz.org page
