= Keiko Utoku =

Japanese singer-songwriter, radio personality, model

Keiko Utoku 宇徳 敬子
- Born: April 7, 1967 (age 59); Izumi, Kagoshima, Japan
- Genres: J-pop
- Occupations: singer; songwriter
- Years active: 1993–2007; 2013–present
- Labels: Zain Records; UK Sweet
- Formerly of: B.B.Queens; Mi-Ke
- Website: uk-dream.jp

YouTube information
- Channel: 宇徳敬子 Official YouTube Channel
- Years active: 2015 -
- Subscribers: 11.6 thousand
- Views: 2.2 million
- Last updated: January 15, 2024

Keiko Utoku (宇徳敬子, Utoku Keiko; born April 7, 1967 in Izumi, Kagoshima, Japan) is a Japanese singer and songwriter under UK Sweet label.

== Biography ==
Keiko made her debut with a chorus part in the band B.B.Queens then joined with J-pop female band Mi-Ke from 1991 to 1993, before starting a solo career. As a child, Utoku listened to a lot of music, including music made by Momoe Yamaguchi. She has written and sung many songs, such as "Wasurenagusa", and Sonic the Hedgehog fans remember her for her vocal work in the original version of the Sonic CD video game's opening and closing themes in Japan and Europe, "Sonic – You Can Do Anything" and "Cosmic Eternity – Believe In Yourself" in 1993. Her song "Mabushii Hito" was used by JR Central for TOKYO PLUS ONE campaign between 1993 and 1994.

At recent dates, she has released 15 singles, 5 digital singles, 4 studio albums, 1 mini and 2 best albums.

== Discography ==
=== Albums ===
==== Studio albums ====
List of albums, with selected chart positions
Title	Album details	Peak positions	Sales (JPN)	Certifications
Title	Album details	JPN Oricon	Sales (JPN)	Certifications
Suna Dokei (砂時計)	Released: October 10, 1994; Label: Zain; Format(s): CD, digital download	1	406,000	RIAJ: Platinum
Koori (氷)	Released: November 11, 1996; Label: Zain; Format(s): CD, digital download	2	197,000	RIAJ: Gold
Mengetsu ~Rhythm~ (満月 ～rhythm～)	Released: August 26, 1998; Label: Zain; Format(s): CD, digital download	8	83,000	
Yorokobi no Hana ga Saku ~True Kiss~ (よろこびの花が咲く ～True Love～)	Released: November 22, 2006; Label: Zain; Format(s): CD, digital download	72	4,000	

==== Compilation albums ====
List of albums, with selected chart positions
Title	Album details	Peak positions	Sales (JPN)	Certifications
Title	Album details	JPN Oricon	Sales (JPN)	Certifications
The Best "Eternity"	Released: December 17, 2003; Label: Zain; Format(s): CD, digital download	63	9,000	
Keiko Utoku Complete Best ~Single Collection~	Released: December 21, 2011; Label: Zain; Format(s): CD, digital download	106		
Slow Life to Watashi ~Organic Cafe~ (スローライフと私 ～Organic Cafe～)	Released: August 8, 2018; Label: UK Sweet; Format(s): CD, digital download	80		
Slow Life wo Anata to ~Alone Together~ (スローライフをあなたと〜Alone Together〜)	Released: August 8, 2024; Label: UK Sweet; Format(s): CD	-		

==== Remix albums ====
List of albums, with selected chart positions
Title	Album details
Cool City Production Vol. 7 UK Sweet ~Utoku Keiko~	Released: July 7, 2004; Label: Tent House; Format(s): CD

=== Extended plays ===
List of albums, with selected chart positions
Title	Album details	Peak positions	Sales (JPN)	Certifications
Title	Album details	JPN Oricon	Sales (JPN)	Certifications
Shingetsu ~Rainbow~ (新月 ～Rainbow～)	Released: March 9, 2016; Label: UK Sweet; Format(s): CD, digital download	74		

=== Singles ===
==== As lead artist ====
List of singles, with selected chart positions
Title	Year	Peak chart positions	Sales	Certifications	Album
Title	Year	JPN Oricon	Sales	Certifications	Album
"Good-by Morning" (with Fusanosuke Kondo)	1992	19	289,000	RIAJ: Gold	Woman Dream Original Soundtrack
"Anata no Yume no Naka Sotto Shinobikomitai" (あなたの夢の中 そっと忍び込みたい)	1993	17	135,000		Suna Dokei
"Mabushii Hito" (まぶしい人)	1993	14	209,000		Suna Dokei
"Aisazu ni wa Irarenai" (愛さずにはいられない)	1994	10	147,000		Suna Dokei
"Dokomade mo Zutto" (どこまでもずっと)	1994	25	98,000		Suna Dokei
"Anata wa Watashi no Energy" (あなたは 私の ENERGY)	1995	10	80,000		Koori
"Fushigi na Sekai" (不思議な世界)	1995	13	91,000		Koori
"Anata ga Sekai Ichi" (あなたが世界)	1996	20	48,000		Koori
"Message" (メッセージ)	1996	32	25,000		Koori
"Hikari to Kage no Roman" (光と影のロマン)	1997	20	54,000		Mengetsu ~Rhythm~
"Michi Shio no Mangetsu" (満ち潮の満月)	1997	49	11,000		Mengetsu ~Rhythm~
"Kaze no You ni Jiyuu ~Free as the Wind~" (風のように自由 ～free as the wind～)	1998	33	12,000		Mengetsu ~Rhythm~
"Don't Forget Me"	1998	90	2,000		Mengetsu ~Rhythm~
"Realize"	1999	56	5,000		Yorokobi no Hana ga Saku ~True Kiss~
"Taisetsu ni Omou et Cetera" (大切に想うエトセトラ)	2000	44	7,000		Yorokobi no Hana ga Saku ~True Kiss~
"Happy Way"	2014	125			Non-album singles
"Destiny ~Kiseki no Kagayaki~" (Destiny ～キセキの輝き～)	2014	125			Non-album singles
