= Azumi Uehara =

- 上原 あずみ
- Born: April 10, 1984 (age 42); Osaka, Japan
- Other names: Azumi, Yui Nagahara
- Occupations: Singer; Porn actress
- Musical career
- Genres: Japanese pop
- Years active: 2001–2010
- Label: Giza Studio
- Website: www.mutekimuteki.com/actress/2000007/index.html

Azumi Uehara (Japanese: 上原 あずみ, Hepburn: Uehara Azumi; born April 10, 1984) is a Japanese former Porn actress and Japanese pop singer.

== Life and career ==
Uehara debuted in 2001 with the song "Aoi Aoi Kono Hoshi ni" (青い青いこの地球に) which was featured on the anime Detective Conan as its 13th ending song. Both the song and the subsequent album were highly successful. Signed up to Giza Studio, after several minor hits she was fired by her agency in 2007 as she was involved in a fraud scandal, and this was considered "a serious breach of contract". After a long hiatus, she resurfaced in 2012, appearing in an uncensored porn with the stage name of Yui Nagahara (長原ゆい) and then making the debut in the main porn circuit with the label Muteki and using just her first name, Azumi. She left the label in 2014.

== Discography ==
=== Albums ===
Title	Album details	Peak chart positions	Sales (JPN)
Title	Album details	JPN	Sales (JPN)
Mushoku (無色)	Released: November 6, 2002; Label: Giza Studio; Formats: CD, digital download	5	61,956
Ikitakuwanai Bokura (生きたくはない僕等)	Released: October 18, 2006; Label: Giza Studio; Formats: CD, digital download	49	3,262

=== Singles ===
Title	Year	Peak chart positions	Sales	Album
Title	Year	JPN	Sales	Album
""Aoi Aoi Kono Hoshi ni" (青い青いこの地球に)"	2001	9	83,820	Mushoku
"Special Holynight"	2001	19	36,250	Mushoku
"Bye Bye My Blue Sky"	2002	33	12,810	Mushoku
"Lazy"	2002	33	8,410	Mushoku
"Mushoku" (無色)	2002	5	49,350	Mushoku
"Himitsu" (秘密)	2005	40	4,773	Ikitakuwanai Bokura
"Never free"	2006	55	2,268	Ikitakuwanai Bokura
"Song for you: Seiippai Chigaraippai" (Song for you ～精一杯力一杯～)	2006	74	1,384	Ikitakuwanai Bokura

=== Other appearances ===
List of non-single guest appearances, with other performing artists, showing year released and album name
Title	Year	Other performer(s)	Album
"Hawaii"	2002	Mai-K and Friend	Giza Studio Mai-K & Friends Hotrod Beach Party
"Shōjo A"	2003	Tak Matsumoto	The Hit Parade

== Filmography ==
=== Porn (AV) ===
Release date	Video title	Company	Director	Notes
2013-01-01	Colorless Azumi	Muteki; TEK-045		AV debut
2013-05-01	First Impression Azumi	Idea Pocket Tissue; IPZ-094	Tadanori Usami	
2013-06-01	Semen Face and 4 Real Sex 顔射解禁×4本番 AZUMI	Idea Pocket Tissue; IPZ-118	ザ・苦労人	
2013-07-01	Azumi Sex and Rich Kiss; AZUMIの濃厚な接吻とSEX	Idea Pocket Tissue; IPZ-137	ザ・苦労人	
2013-08-01	Beautiful Shaved Woman Azumi 美女のパイパンSEX AZUMI	Idea Pocket Tissue; IPZ-164	ザ・苦労人	
2013-10-01	Digital Channel DC109 Azumi	Idea Pocket Supreme; SUPD-109	Jirō Tsubuyaki	
