= Garnet Crow discography =

- Studio albums: 10
- Extended plays: 1
- Compilation albums: 3
- Singles: 32
- Video albums: 3

The discography of Garnet Crow, a Japanese J-pop band, consists of ten studio albums, one extended play, and thirty-one singles.

Garnet Crow released their debut album, First Soundscope: Mizu no Nai Hareta Umi e in 2001 in Japan, where it reached number six. "Mysterious Eyes" was their first single and it went to number twenty. Subsequent singles "Kimi no Uchi ni Tsuku made Zutto Hashitte Yuku", "Futari no Rocket", "Sen Ijō no Kotoba wo Narabete mo...", "Natsu no Maboroshi" and "Flying" reached the top fifty in Japan.

== Albums ==
=== Studio albums ===
List of studio albums, with selected chart positions
Title	Album details	Peak position	Sales	Certifications
Title	Album details	JPN Oricon	Sales	Certifications
First Soundscope: Mizu no Nai Hareta Umi e	Released: January 31, 2001; Label: Giza Studio; Format: CD, digital download	6	87,000	
Sparkle: Sujigakidōri no Sky Blue	Released: April 24, 2002; Label: Giza Studio; Format: CD, digital download	4	156,000	
Crystallize: Kimi to Iu Hikari	Released: November 12, 2003; Label: Giza Studio; Format: CD, digital download	5	84,000	RIAJ: Gold
I'm Waiting 4 You	Released: December 8, 2004; Label: Giza Studio; Format: CD, digital download	11	64,000	
The Twilight Valley	Released: October 4, 2006; Label: Giza Studio; Format: CD/DVD, CD, digital download	4	58,000	
Locks	Released: March 12, 2008; Label: Giza Studio; Format: CD, CD+DVD, digital download	5	45,000	
Stay: Yoake no Soul	Released: September 30, 2009; Label: Giza Studio; Format: CD, CD/DVD, 2CD, digital download	7	31,000	
Parallel Universe	Released: December 8, 2010; Label: Giza Studio; Format: CD, CD/DVD, digital download	10	23,000	
Memories	Released: December 7, 2011; Label: Giza Studio; Format: CD, CD/DVD, digital download	7	20,000	
Terminus	Released: March 20, 2013; Label: Giza Studio; Format: CD, CD/DVD, digital download	9	17,000	

=== Compilation albums ===
List of studio albums, with selected chart positions
Title	Album details	Peak position	Sales	Certifications
Title	Album details	JPN Oricon	Sales	Certifications
Best	Released: October 26, 2005; Label: Giza Studio; Format: 2CD, digital download	4	109,000	RIAJ: Gold
The Best History of Garnet Crow at the Crest...	Released: February 3, 2010; Label: Giza Studio; Format: 2CD, 3CD, digital download	6	37,000	
All Lovers	Released: August 4, 2010; Label: Giza Studio; Format: CD	16	12,000	
Goodbye Lonely: Bside collection	Released: February 29, 2012; Label: Giza Studio; Format: 2CD, 2CD+DVD	7	15,000	
The One: All Singles Best	Released: May 22, 2013; Label: Giza Studio; Format: 3CD, digital download	9	14,000	
Garnet Crow Request Best	Released: October 9, 2013; Label: Giza Studio; Format: 2CD, digital download	9	8,000	
Garnet Crow Premium Box	Released: April 7, 2014; Label: Giza Studio; Format: 24CD+8DVD	—		
Garnet Crow Best of Ballads	Released: December 24, 2014; Label: Giza Studio; Format: 2CD	55	2,500	

=== Extended plays ===
Year	Album details	Peak
1999	First Kaleidscope: Kimi no Uchi ni Tsuku made Zutto Hashitte Yuku: Released: December 4, 1999; Label: Tent House (TCR-001)	—

=== Remix albums ===
Year	Album details	Peak
2004	Garnet Crow Remixes Cool City Production Vol. 8: Released: December 1, 2004; Label: Tent House (TCR-029)	—

== Singles ==
Year	Title	Chart Position	Sales	Album
Year	Title	Japan	Sales	Album
2000	"Mysterious Eyes"	20	61,040	First Soundscope: Mizu no Nai Hareta Umi e
2000	"Kimi no Uchi ni Tsuku made Zutto Hashitte Yuku" 君の家に着くまでずっと走ってゆく)	40	11,890	First Soundscope: Mizu no Nai Hareta Umi e
2000	"Futari no Rocket" 二人のロケット)	47	6,940	First Soundscope: Mizu no Nai Hareta Umi e
2000	"Sen Ijō no Kotoba wo Narabete mo..." 千以上の言葉を並べても...)	42	7,790	First Soundscope: Mizu no Nai Hareta Umi e
2000	"Natsu no Maboroshi" 夏の幻)	20	40,950	First Soundscope: Mizu no Nai Hareta Umi e
2000	"Flying"	25	49,350	First Soundscope: Mizu no Nai Hareta Umi e
2001	"Last Love Song"	19	17,630	Sparkle: Sujigakidōri no Sky Blue
2001	"Call My Name"	29	20,120	Sparkle: Sujigakidōri no Sky Blue
2001	"Timeless Sleep"	33	15,250	Sparkle: Sujigakidōri no Sky Blue
2002	"Yume Mita Ato De" 夢みたあとで)	6	93,300	Sparkle: Sujigakidōri no Sky Blue
2002	"Spiral" スパイラル)	7	35,040	Crystallize: Kimi to Iu Hikari
2002	"Crystal Gauge" クリスタル・ゲージ)	10	26,414	Crystallize: Kimi to Iu Hikari
2003	"Nakenai Yoru mo Nakanai Asa mo" 泣けない夜も 泣かない朝も)	13	23,084	Crystallize: Kimi to Iu Hikari
2003	"Kimi to Iu Hikari" 君という光)	7	35,190	Crystallize: Kimi to Iu Hikari
2004	"Bokura Dake no Mirai" 僕らだけの未来)	7	32,102	I'm Waiting 4 You
2004	"Kimi wo Kazaru Hana wo Sakasō" 君を飾る花を咲かそう)	11	22,719	I'm Waiting 4 You
2004	"Wasurezaki" 忘れ咲き)	14	25,950	I'm Waiting 4 You
2005	"Kimi no Omoi Egaita Yume Atsumeru Heaven" 君の思い描いた夢 集メル HEAVEN)	9	27,993	Best
2005	"Haredokei" 晴れ時計)	13	22,071	The Twilight Valley
2006	"Rai Rai Ya" 籟・来・也)	17	22,023	The Twilight Valley
2006	"Yume Hanabi" 夢・花火)	15	25,018	The Twilight Valley
2006	"Koyoi Eden no Katasumi de" 今宵エデンの片隅で)	14	18,941	The Twilight Valley
2006	"Maboroshi" まぼろし)	7	18,494	The Twilight Valley
2007	"Kaze to Rainbow/Kono te wo Nobaseba" 風とRAINBOW／この手を伸ばせば)	6	29,738	Locks
2007	"Namida no Yesterday" 涙のイエスタデー)	10	23,829	Locks
2007	"Sekai wa Mawaru to Iu Keredo" 世界はまわると言うけれど)	12	19,414	Locks
2008	"Yume no Hitotsu" 夢のひとつ)	10	15,341	Stay: Yoake no Soul
2008	"Hyakunen no Kodoku" 百年の孤独)	9	16,543	Stay: Yoake no Soul
2009	"Doing All Right/Nora"	10	17,055	Stay: Yoake no Soul
2009	"Hana wa Saite Tada Yurete" 花は咲いて ただ揺れて)	14	12,201	Stay: Yoake no Soul
2010	"Over Drive"	4	21,776	Parallel Universe
2011	"Smiley Nation"	10	10,133	Memories
2011	"Misty Mystery"	9	15,439	Memories
2012	"Nostalgia"	10	9,973	Terminus

== Live DVD ==
No.	Title	Release date	Sales	Oricon Charts
1st	Garnet Crow First Livescope and Document Movie	26 February 2003	19,319	2
2nd	Garnet Crow Livescope 2004 ~Kimi to Iu Hikari~ (〜君という光〜)	16 June 2004	13,941	3
3rd	Le 5 ème anniversaire" L'Histoire de 2000 à 2005	20 July 2005	17,582	3
4th	Garnet Crow Livescope of The Twilight Valley	27 June 2007	15,928	1
5th	GARNET CROW Special live in Ninna-ji (仁和寺)	27 June 2007	10,837	7
6th	Are You Ready To Lock On?! ~Livescope at the JCB Hall~	20 May 2009	8,043	4
7th	Garnet Crow Livescope 2010 ~THE BEST TOUR~	4 August 2010	8,225	2
8th	Garnet Crow Livescope 2009 ~Yoake no Soul~ (〜夜明けのSoul〜)	29 June 2011	5,587	5
9th	Garnet Crow Livescope 2010+ ~welcome to the parallel universe!~	29 June 2011	5,896	4
10th	Garnet Crow Livescope 2012 ~the tales of memories~	29 June 2012	5,291	5
11th	Garnet Crow Livescope ~THE FINAL~	9 October 2013	-	4
12nd	Garnet Crow Livescope 2013 ~Terminus~	24 March 2021	-	23
