= Diary (Shiori Takei album) =

Studio album by Shiori Takei
- Released: April 18, 2007
- Recorded: 2006–2007
- Genre: J-pop
- Length: 55minutes
- Label: Giza Studio
- Producer: Shiori Takei

Shiori Takei chronology
second tune ~Sekai Tomete~ (2005)	Diary (2007)	Documentary (2007)

Singles from Diary
- 1. "Sakurairo" Released: 1 February 2006; 2. "Kitto mou Koi ni wa Naranai" Released: 30 August 2006; 3. "Like a little Love" Released: 8 November 2006; 4. "Yume no Tsuzuki" Released: 28 February 2007

Diary is the third and final studio album by Shiori Takei, released on April 18, 2007 under Giza Studio label. The album is consist of four previous released singles, such as Sakura Iro, Kitto Mou Koi ni wa Naranai, Like a little Love and Yume no Tsuzuki. The album charted at #48 on the Oricon charts in its first week. It charted for 2 weeks and sold 3,974 copies. Before she retired she released one mini and a compilation album.

== Track listing ==
No.	Title	Lyrics	Music	Arrangers	Length
1.	"Sakurairo" (桜色)	Nana Azuki (Garnet Crow)	Keika	Satoru Kobayashi	5:24
2.	"Ibitsuna Kajitsu" (いびつな果実)	Shiori Takei	Hiya & Katsuma	Satoru Kobayashi	4:20
3.	"Maigo no Machi" (迷子の街)	Shiori Takei	Shiori Takei	Satoru Kobayashi	4:46
4.	"Saigo no Curve" (最後のカーブ)	Shiori Takei	Chiho Kiyooka	Nakedgrun	4:43
5.	"milky way"	Shiori Takei	Aika Ohno	Satoru Kobayashi	4:02
6.	"Kitto mou Koi ni wa Naranai" (きっともう恋にはならない)	Azuki	Aika Ohno	Taishi Ozeki	4:19
7.	"cycle" (サイクル)	Shiori Takei	Keika	Yoshinobu Ohga	4:43
8.	"Like a little Love"	Azuki	Akihito Tokunaga (Doa)	Satoru Kobayashi	4:17
9.	"Namiki Michi" (並木道)	Shiori Takei	Kouji Gotou	Tomoyuki Fujiwara	4:31
10.	"sweet home"	Shiori Takei	Masazumi Ozawa	Nakedgrun	4:29
11.	"Onaji Yoru Chigau Asa" (同じ夜 違う朝)	Shiori Takei	Keika	Nakedgrun	4:03
12.	"Yume no Tsuzuki" (夢のつづき)	Shiori Takei	Kouji Gotou	Satoru Kobayashi	4:03
13.	"outro.sleep"	Shiori Takei	Shiori Takei	Hitoshi Okamoto (Garnet Crow)	1:09

== Personnel ==
Credits adapted from the CD booklet of Diary.

- Shiori Takei – vocals, songwriting, composing, whistling, piano
- Ohga Yoshinobu (OOM) - guitar
- Hiroshi Asai (The★tambourines) - bass
- Tetsuya Hashio (Nakedgrun) - guitar, bass
- U-zo Ohkusu (OOM) - organ, piano, electronic piano
- Keisuke Kuratamani (U-ka Saegusa in dB) - percussion, drum
- Hitoshi Okamoto (Garnet Crow) - guitar, arranging
- Atsushi Kanayama - drum
- Takuto Unigame - bass
- Tomoyuki Fujiwara - arranging, piano
- Shinji Takashima - male vox
- Koga Kazunori - guitar
- Takahashi Tomomichi - flute
- Souta Kishimoto - male vox
- Gan Kojima – art direction
- Kanonji - producing

== Usage in media ==
- Sakurairo: ending theme for TV Anime MÄR
- Yume no Tsuzuki: ending theme for Tokyo TV program "Japan Countdown"
- Like a Little Love: ending theme for "Music Japan" program "BREAK TV"
- Kitto mou Koi ni wa Naranai: ending theme for Tokyo TV program "Japan Countdown"
