= My Favorite Things (Shiori Takei album) =

Studio album by Shiori Takei
- Released: September 15, 2004
- Recorded: 2004
- Genre: J-pop
- Length: 43 minutes
- Label: Giza Studio
- Producer: Shiori Takei

Shiori Takei chronology
My Favorite Things (2004)	second tune ~Sekai Tomete~ (2005)

Singles from My Favorite Things
- 1. "Shizukanaru Melody" Released: 18 February 2004; 2. "Kimi ni Koishiteru" Released: 19 May 2004

My Favorite Things is the first studio album by Shiori Takei, released on September 15, 2004 under Giza Studio label. The album consists of two previous released singles such as Shizukanaru Melody and Kimi ni Koishiteru. The album charted at #78 on the Oricon charts in its first week. It charted for 2 weeks and sold 4,237 copies.

== Track listing ==
No.	Title	Lyrics	Music	Arrangers	Length
1.	"Shizukanaru Melody " (静かなるメロディー)	Nana Azuki (Garnet Crow)	Aika Ohno	Satoru Kobayashi	4:46
2.	"Ano Umi ga Mietara" (あの海が見えたら)	Shiori Takei	Akihito Tokunaga (Doa)	Hiroshi Asai (The Tambourines)	4:13
3.	"close line"	Nana	Kouji Gotou	Satoru Kobayashi	3:33
4.	"Mitsugetsu" (蜜月 - this song is later released again in 6th single as coupling song in live version)	Shiori Takei	Kenta Takamori	Takashi Masuzaki	4:46
5.	"Atarashii Kisetsu" (新しい季節)	Shiori Takei	Kouji Gotou	Hirohito Furui (Garnet Crow)	2:49
6.	"Futari no Sunny day" (二人のSunny day)	Shiori Takei	Hiya&Katsuma	Hiroshi Asai	4:31
7.	"Yuunagi" (夕凪)	Azuki	Hitoshi Okamoto (Garnet Crow)	Dr. Terachi＆Pierrot Le Fou	4:43
8.	"Hoshi no Kakera Kimi no Namida" (星のかけら 君の涙)	Shiori Takei	Kouji Gotou	Satoru Kobayashi	2:29
9.	"Toku no Suna" (時の砂)	Shiori Takei	Kouji Gotou	Dr. Terachi＆Pierrot Le Fou	3:20
10.	"Kimi ni Koishiteru" (君に恋してる)	Nana	Kouji Gotou	Satoru Kobayashi	3:46
11.	"Kyou" (今日)	Shiori Takei	Kouji Gotou	Terachi＆Pierrot Le Fou	3:45

== Personnel ==
Credits adapted from the CD booklet of My Favorite Things.

- Shiori Takei – vocals, songwriting
- Nana Azuki (Garnet Crow) - songwriting
- Aika Ohno - composing
- Kenta Takamori - composing
- Koji Goto - composing
- Hiya & Katsuma - composing
- Hitoshi Okamoto (Garnet Crow) - composing
- Akihito Tokunaga (doa) - composing
- Satoru Kobayashi - arranging
- Hirohito Furui (Garnet Crow) - arranging
- Hiroshi Asai (The Tambourines) - arranging
- Dr.Terachi & Pierrot Le Fou - arranging
- Takashi Masuzaki (Dimension) - guitar, bass, arranging
- Ohga Yoshinobu (OOM) - guitar
- Koga Kazunori - guitar
- Itsufumu Ohgawa - guitar
- Akira Onozuka (Dimension) - piano
- Osamu Ueishi - trumpet, flugel horn
- Juan Carlos López Valdés - percussions
- Shinji Takashima - directing, male vox
- Aki Morimoto - recording engineer
- Katsuyuki Yoshimatsu - recording engineer
- Shin Takauwa - recording engineer
- Takayuki Ichikawa - recording engineer
- Hiroyuki Kubota - recording engineer
- Akio Nakajima - mix engineer
- Masahiro Shimada - mastering engineer
- Gan Kojima – art direction
- Kanonji - producing

== In media ==
- Shizukanaru Melody: the song was used in Yomiuri Telecasting Corporation TV program "Pro Doumyaku" as ending theme
