= Like a little Love =

Single by Shiori Takei

from the album Diary
- Released: November 8, 2006
- Genre: J-pop
- Label: Giza Studio
- Songwriter(s): Nana Azuki/Akihito Tokunaga
- Producer(s): Shiori Takei

Shiori Takei singles chronology
"Kitto mou Koi ni wa Naranai" (2006)	"Like a little Love" (2006)	"Yume no Tsuzuki" (2007)

"Like a little Love" is the eighth single by Shiori Takei and released November 8, 2006 under Giza Studio label. The single reached #59 rank first week. It charted for 1 weeks and sold over 1,605 copies.

== Track list ==
1. Like a little Love
  - lyricist: Nana Azuki (Garnet Crow)/composer: Akihito Tokunaga (Doa)/arranger: Satoru Kobayashi
2. Atatakana Fuyu no Hi (あたたかな冬の日)
  - lyricist: Shiori Takei/composer: Mai Imai/arranger: Satoru Kobayashi
3. Ryuusei (流星)
  - lyricist and composer: Shiori Takei/arranger: Hiroshi Asai (The Tambourines)
4. Like a little Love (less vocal)
