= Best (Garnet Crow album) =

Greatest hits album by Garnet Crow
- Released: 26 October 2005
- Recorded: 2000–2005
- Genre: Japanese pop
- Length: Disc 1: 61:39; Disc 2: 66:36
- Label: Giza Studio
- Producer: Garnet Crow; Kanonji

Garnet Crow chronology
I'm Waiting 4 You (2004)	Best (2005)	The Twilight Valley (2006)

Singles from Flavor of Life
- 1. "Kimi no Omoi Kaita Atsumeru Heaven" Released: May 18, 2005

Best is the first greatest hits album by Japanese band Garnet Crow. It was released on 26 October 2005 under Giza Studio.

== Background ==
The album was released as promotion for the band's 5th anniversary of debut.

Album includes all 18 chronologically released singles released - from debut single Mysterious Eyes until Kimi no Omoi Kaita Atsumeru Heaven.

The album also includes various tracks from their studio albums and b-side tracks from singles, such as Mizu no Nai Hareta Umi e or Mikanseina Neiro.

New unreleased song, Sora Iro Neko, was originally performed by Sayuri Iwata.

Sayonara to Tatta Hitokoto de was introduced for the first time in their live tour GARNET CROW livescope 2005 ~I'm waiting 4 you & live~ before the official recording release.

The hidden track includes live recording of Yume wo Mita Ato de from their live tour GARNET CROW livescope 2004 -Kimi to Iu Hikari-

Their 18th single, Kimi no Omoi Egaita Yume Atsumeru Heaven was exclusively included in this album, it never appeared in any studio album, however in 2013 it appears in the best of album The One: All Singles Best.

== Commercial performance ==
The album reached #4 in its first week and sold more than 55,000 copies. The album charted for 13 weeks and totally sold 108,703 copies.

== Track listing ==
All songs were composed by Yuri Nakamura, written by Nana Azuki and arranged by Hirohito Furui.

=== Disc one ===
No.	Title	Length
1.	"Kimi no Uchi ni Tsuku made Zutto Hashitte Yuku (君の家に着くまでずっと走ってゆく)" (1st indies album First Kaleidoscope)	4:07
2.	"Mysterious Eyes" (1st single)	4:31
3.	"In little time" (2nd single's coupling)	4:19
4.	"Futari no Rocket (二人のロケット)" (3rd single)	4:46
5.	"Mikansei na Neiro (未完成な音色)" (3rd single's coupling song)	3:35
6.	"Sen Ijō no Kotoba wo Narabete mo... (千以上の言葉を並べても...)" (4th single)	4:15
7.	"Natsu no Maboroshi (夏の幻)" (secret arrange ver., 1st studio album First Soundscope)	4:20
8.	"Flying" (6th single)	4:31
9.	"Mizu no Nai Hareta Umi e (水のない晴れた海へ)" (1st studio album First Soundscope)	4:37
10.	"Last love song" (7th single)	3:37
11.	"Call my name" (8th single)	4:52
12.	"Timeless Sleep" (9th single)	4:37
13.	"Yume Mita Ato de (夢みたあとで)" (10th single)	5:01
14.	"Holy Ground" (2nd studio album Sparkle)	4:39

=== Disc two ===
No.	Title	Length
1.	"Spiral (Sport! ver.)" (スパイラル, 11th single)	4:08
2.	"Crystal Gauge" (クリスタル・ゲージ, 12th single)	3:25
3.	"Nakenai Yoru mo Nakanai Asa mo" (泣けない夜も 泣かない朝も, 13th single)	4:12
4.	"Kimi to Iu Hikari" (君という光, 14th single)	5:10
5.	"Eien wo Kakenukeru Isshun no Bokura" (永遠を駆け抜ける一瞬の僕ら, 3rd studio album Crystallize)	4:16
6.	"Bokura Dake no Mirai" (僕らだけの未来, 15th single)	3:12
7.	"Kimi wo Kazaru Hana wo Sakasou" (君を飾る花を咲かそう, 16th single)	4:15
8.	"Wasurezaki" (忘れ咲き, 17th single)	4:58
9.	"Sky ~New arranged track~" (1st indies album First Kaleidoscope)	5:14
10.	"Yuzukyo" (夕月夜, 5th studio album I'm Waiting 4 You)	4:49
11.	"Kimi Tsuresaru Toki no Otozure wo" (君 連れ去る時の訪れを, 5th studio album I'm Waiting 4 You)	4:45
12.	"Kimi no Omoi Egaita Yume Atsumeru Heaven" (君の思い描いた夢 集メル HEAVEN, 18th single)	4:14
13.	"Sora Iro Neko" (空色の猫, new song)	4:29
14.	"Sayonara to Tatta Hitokoto de" (「さよなら」とたった一言で..., new song)	4:39
15.	"Yume Mita Ato de (livescope 2004 ver.)" (secret track)	5:32

== Personnel ==
Credits adapted from the CD booklet of Best.

- Yuri Nakamura - vocals, composing, backing vocals
- Nana Azuki - songwriting, keyboard
- Hirohito Furui - arranging, keyboard
- Hitoshi Okamoto - acoustic guitar, bass, backing vocals
- Miguel Sá Pessoa - arranging
- Michael Africk - backing vocals
- Yoshinobu Ohga (OOM) - guitar
- Yuuichiro Iwai (U-ka Saegusa in dB) - acoustic guitar
- Masato Ohashi (Feel so bad) - bass
- David C.Brown - drums
- Keisuke Kurumatani (U-ka Saegusa in dB) - drums, label management
- Katsuyuki Yoshimatu - recording engineer
- Aki Morimoto - recording engineer
- Akoi Nakajima - mixing engineer
- Takayuki Ichikawa - mixing engineer
- Tomko Nozaki - mixing engineer
- Masahiro Shiamda - mastering engineer
- Mods House - art direction
- Kanonji - executive producer

== In media ==
- Mysterious Eyes - opening theme for Anime television series Detective Conan
- Futari no Rocket - campaign theme song for MFTV
- Sen Ijō no Kotoba wo Narabete mo - commercial song for Dome
- Natsu no Maboroshi - ending theme for Anime television series Detective Conan
- flying - opening theme for PlayStation game Tales of Eternia
- Last Love Song - ending theme for TV Asahi program Beat Takeshi's TV Tackle
- Call my name - ending theme for Anime television series Project ARMS
- Timeless sleep - ending theme for Anime television series Project ARMS
- Yume Mita Ato de - ending theme for Anime television series Detective Conan
- Holy Ground - ending theme for Nihon TV program Bakushou Mondai no Susume
- Spiral - theme song in Fuji TV program Sport!
- Crystal Gauge - ending theme in TBS program Pooh!
- Nakenai Yoru mo Nakanai Asa mo - ending theme for Fuji TV program Uchimura Produce
- Kimi to Iu Hikari - ending theme for Anime television series Detective Conan
- Eien wo Kakenukeru Isshun no Bokura - ending theme for Tokyo Broadcasting System Television program Sunday Japan
- Bokura Dake no Mirai - theme song for Fuji TV program Sport!
- Kimi wo Kazaru Hana wo Sakasou - ending theme for Anime television series Monkey Turn
- Wasurezaki - ending theme for Anime television series Detective Conan
- Kimi no Omoi Egaita Yume Atsumeru Heaven - opening theme for Anime television series MÄR
