= Home Again (The Tambourines album) =

Studio album by The Tambourines
- Released: November 26, 2003
- Recorded: 2003
- Genre: J-pop
- Length: 33:29
- Label: Giza Studio
- Producer: The Tambourines

The Tambourines chronology
| Dizzy Season (2003) | Home Again (2003) | Sounds Good ~Himekuri Shashin~ (2005) |

Singles from Home Again
- 1. "Everything is nothing" Released: August 6, 2003

Home Again is the third studio album by Japanese pop band The Tambourines. It was released on November 26, 2003, seven months after the release of Dizzy Season through Giza Studio.

== Background ==
The album consists of only one previous released singles, such as "Everything is nothing".

This single was released in the Giza Studio's compilation album Giza Studio Masterpiece Blend 2003.

Like "My Back Pages", this album has only eight tracks.

This time six songs out of eight were composed by band themselves.

== Chart performance ==
The album reached No. 175 on the Oricon albums chart in its first and only week on the chart. This is the last album by the band to enter the top 200 Oricon rankings.

== Track listing ==
All lyrics are written by Ami Matsunaga

| No. | Title | Music | Arrangers | Length |
|---|---|---|---|---|
| 1. | "Home Again" | Ami Matsunaga | Hiroshi Asai | 4:04 |
| 2. | "Mienai Ashita" (ミエナイ明日) | Asai | Asai | 4:17 |
| 3. | "Ayawuki" (あわゆき) | Matsunaga | Asai | 5:19 |
| 4. | "Everything is nothing" | Terukado | Satoru Kobayashi | 4:43 |
| 5. | "Jumping on the running train" | Asai | Asai | 4:14 |
| 6. | "Your hands" | Asai | Asai | 3:35 |
| 7. | "Spirit beat" | Asaii | Asai | 4:11 |
| 8. | "Fighting girl" | Makoto Miyoshi (ex.Rumania Montevideo) | Asai | 3:09 |

== In media ==
- Everything is nothing - ending theme for Yomiuri TV program Pro no Doumyaku.
