= Shizukanaru Melody =

Single by Shiori Takei

from the album My Favorite Things
- Released: February 18, 2004
- Genre: J-Pop
- Length: 17 minutes
- Label: Giza Studio

Shiori Takei singles chronology
"Shizukanaru Melody" (2004)	"Kimi ni Koishiteru" (2004)

"Shizukanaru Melody (静かなるメロディー)" is the debut single by Shiori Takei and released 18 February 2004 under Giza Studio label. The single reached #88 rank first week and sold 1,495 copies. It charted for 2 weeks and sold over 2,116 copies.

== Track listing ==
No.	Title	Lyrics	Music	Arrangers	Length
1.	"Shizukanaru Melody" (静かなるメロディー)	Nana Azuki (Garnet Crow)	Aika Ohno	Satoru Kobayashi	4:46
2.	"close line"	Nana	Kouji Gotou	Satoru Kobayashi	3:31
3.	"Yasashii Hizashi" (優しい陽射し)	Shiori Takei	Kouji Gotou	Hiroshi Asai (The Tambourines)	3:59
4.	"Shizukanaru Melody" (less vocal)				4:46

== In media ==
- "Shizukanaru Melody": the song was used in Yomiuri TV program Pro Doumyaku as ending theme

== Cover ==
The composer of Shizukanaru Melody, Aika Ohno self-cover this single in her cover album Silent Passage.
