= Dizzy Season =

Studio album by The Tambourines
- Released: April 23, 2003
- Recorded: 2002–2003
- Genre: J-pop
- Length: 35:24
- Label: Giza Studio
- Producer: The Tambourines

The Tambourines chronology
My back pages (2002)	Dizzy Season (2003)	Home Again (2003)

Singles from Dizzy Season
- 1. "Wonder boy" Released: July 14, 2002; 2. "Atsui Namida" Released: December 18, 2002; 3. "afresh wish" Released: March 5, 2003

Dizzy Season is the second studio album by Japanese pop band The Tambourines. It was released on April 23, 2003, through Giza Studio.

== Background ==
The album consists of three previous released singles, such as "Wonder boy", "Atsui Namida" (アツイナミダ) and "Afresh wish".

Atsui Namida received special mix under title album version. This time five songs out of ten were composed by band themselves.

A singles Wonder Boy was released in the Giza Studio's compilation album Giza Studio Masterpiece Blend 2002 and Afresh wish in the compilation album Giza Studio Masterpiece Blend 2003.

== Chart performance ==
The album charted at #115 on the Oricon albums chart in its first week. It charted for two weeks and sold over 3,000 copies.

== Track listing ==
All lyrics are written by Ami Matsunaga.

Dizzy Season
No.	Title	Music	Arrangers	Length
1.	"boarding"	Hiroshi Asai	Asai	1:56
2.	"Innocent flight"	Asai	Asai	4:10
3.	"Atsui Namida (アツイナミダ)" (album mix)	Makoto Miyoshi (ex.Rumania Montevideo)	Yoshinobu Ohga (ex. nothin' but love)	5:00
4.	"Wonder boy"	Akihito Tokunaga	Ohga	4:03
5.	"Maybe...still"	Ami Matsunaga	Ohga	4:42
6.	"Vibes"	Matsunaga	the★tambourines	1:49
7.	"Afresh wish"	Tokunaga	Tokunaga	4:14
8.	"Fighting girl"	Miyoshi	Asai	3:28
9.	"Flash back" (mono mix)	Yuuichirou Iwai (U-ka Saegusa in dB	Hirohito Furui (Garnet Crow)	4:33
10.	"ending"	Asai	Asai	1:33

== In media ==
- Wonder boy - ending theme for Yomiuri TV program Ban!Boo!Pain!!
- Afresh wish - ending theme for Tokyo Broadcasting System Television program Sanma no Super Karakuri TV
