= Kitto mou Koi ni wa Naranai =

Single by Shiori Takei

from the album Diary
- Released: August 30, 2006
- Genre: J-pop
- Label: Giza Studio
- Songwriter(s): Nana Azuki/Aika Ohno

Shiori Takei singles chronology
"Sakurairo" (2006)	"Kitto mou Koi ni wa Naranai" (2006)	"Like a little Love" (2006)

"Kitto mou Koi ni wa Naranai (きっともう恋にはならない)" is the seventh single by Shiori Takei and released August 30, 2006 under Giza Studio label. The single reached #88 in the first week. It charted for 1 week and sold over 1,518 copies.

== Track listing ==
1. Kitto mou Koi ni wa Naranai (きっともう恋にはならない)
  - lyricist: Nana Azuki (Garnet Crow)/composer: Aika Ohno/arranger: Satoru Kobayashi
2. Shiosai Letter (潮騒レター)
  - lyricist: Shiori Takei/composer: Keika/arranger: Hiroshi Asai (The Tambourines)
3. Mitsugetsu (蜜月) live: -Thursday live at Hills Pan Kōjō '06.4.20 -
  - lyricist: Shiori Takei/composer: Kenta Takamori/arranger: Takashi Mazusaki
4. Kitto mou Koi ni wa Naranai (きっともう恋にはならない) (less vocal)
