= Over Drive (Garnet Crow song) =

Single by Garnet Crow

from the album Case Closed: The Lost Ship in the Sky Original Soundtrack and Parallel Universe
- B-side: "la-la-la それから1・2・3"
- Released: April 14, 2010
- Recorded: 2009
- Genre: J-Pop
- Length: 4:27
- Label: Giza Studio
- Songwriters: Yuri Nakamura, Nana Azuki
- Producer: Hirohito Furui

Garnet Crow singles chronology
"Hana wa Saite Tada Yurete" (2009)	"Over Drive" (2010)	"Smiley Nation" (2011)

"Over Drive" is a song performed by the Japanese band Garnet Crow for the original soundtrack to the 2010 anime film Detective Conan: The Lost Ship in the Sky. The song was produced by Hirohito Furui and written by Azuki Nana and Yuri Nakamura. It was released on April 14, 2010, as the lead single from the soundtrack album. "Over Drive" will also appear as one track on Garnet Crow's eighth studio album, Parallel Universe.

== Background ==
"Over Drive"'s lyrics were written by Azuki Nana alongside Yuri Nakamura, who created the melody, and produced by Hirohito Furui for the fourteenth Detective Conan movie, Detective Conan: The Lost Ship in the Sky. The song was released as the theme song and played over the film's end credits.

== Chart performance ==
"Over Drive" made its chart debut on the official Oricon Monthly Singles Chart and Oricon Daily Singles Chart at number four and three respectively on the issue dated April 14, 2010. It has sold a total of 13,823 copies in Japan. "Over Drive" has reached the highest rank on the Oricon chart of any of the band's singles thus far.

== Track listing ==
These are the formats and track listings of major single releases of "Over Drive".

- Digital Download
1. "Over Drive" – 4:27
2. "la-la-la それから1・2・3" - 4:46
- CD single
1. "Over Drive" – 4:27
2. "la-la-la それから1・2・3" - 4:46
3. "Over Drive" (Instrumental) - 4:27
- DVD single
1. "Over Drive" – 4:27
2. "la-la-la それから1・2・3" - 4:46
3. "Over Drive" (Instrumental) - 4:27
4. As the Dew -Director's Cut

== Credits and personnel ==
- Songwriting – Azuki Nana, Yuri Nakamura
- Production – Hirohito Furui

== Charts and certifications ==
=== Charts ===
Chart (2010)	Peak position
Japan Adult Contemporary Airplay	39
Japan Hot 100	20
Japan Hot Singles Sales	5
Japan Hot Top Airplay	47
Oricon Daily Singles Chart	3
Oricon Monthly Singles Chart	4

=== Sales and certifications ===
Country	Certification	Sales/shipments
Japan (RIAJ)	—	13,823

== Release history ==
Region	Date	Format
Japan	April 14, 2010	Digital download, CD single
