= Hana wa Saite Tada Yurete =

Single by Garnet Crow

from the album Stay: Yoake no Soul
- B-side: "Ai ni Niteru"
- Released: August 19, 2009
- Recorded: 2009
- Genre: J-pop
- Length: 4:15
- Label: Giza Studio
- Songwriter(s): Yuri Nakamura, Nana Azuki
- Producer(s): Hirohito Furui

Garnet Crow singles chronology
"Doing All Right" (2009)	"Hana wa Saite Tada Yurete" (2009)	"Over Drive" (2010)

"Hana wa Saite Tada Yurete" (花は咲いて ただ揺れて, Flowers Just Bloom and Sway) is the 30th single by the Japanese band Garnet Crow. It was released on August 19, 2009. The song's melody was created by singer, Nakamura Yuri, with the lyrics written by keyboard player, Azuki Nana. The song is about the lives of flowers, seen from a darker perspective.

A rearranged version of this titular song also appeared on the band's seventh album, Stay: Yoake no Soul. The album's limited edition disc featured another version of the song, titled "Hana wa Saite Tada Yurete: Silent Poet ver.".

It reached number 14 in the Oricon music chart, making it the band's worst-ranked single in three years on the charts.

== Track listing ==
- CD single
1. "Hana wa Saite Tada Yurete" - 4:15
2. "Ai ni Niteru" - 3:28
3. "Hana wa Saite Tada Yurete (Instrumental)" - 4:15
- CD+DVD single
1. "Hana wa Saite Tada Yurete" - 4:15
2. "Ai ni Niteru" - 3:28
3. "Hana wa Saite Tada Yurete (Instrumental)" - 4:15
4. "Hana wa Saite Tada Yurete" (Musicvideo) - 4:15
5. Short music clip from 7th album Stay: Yoake no Soul
- Digital download
1. "Hana wa Saite Tada Yurete" - 4:15
2. "Ai ni Niteru" - 3:28

== Charts and certifications ==
=== Charts ===
Chart (2010)	Peak position
Oricon Weekly Singles Chart	14

=== Sales and certifications ===
Country	Certification	Sales/shipments
Japan (RIAJ)	—	8,940

== Usage in media ==
The song was used as the ending theme for the TV show Uwasa no! Tokyo Magazine.

== Release history ==
Region	Date	Format
Japan	August 19, 2009	Digital download, CD single
