= Soul Crusaders =

Japanese musical group

- Origin: Japan
- Genres: Japanese pop, Soul
- Years active: 2000–2002
- Label: Giza Studio
- Past members: Tomomi Morishita; King Opal; Hiroshi Terao
- Website: http://www.giza.co.jp/soulcrusaders/

Soul Crusaders was a Japanese pop and soul group, formed in 2000 and disbanded in 2002 under Giza Studio label.

== Biography ==
In October 2000, they've made major debut with the single Safety Love which became their smash hit, ranked #30 in Oricon Weekly charts. The lyricist from Garnet Crow, Azuki Nana and composer Aika Ohno were involved with the music production of single. With this song they've made their first TV appearance in Japanese music program Hey! Hey! Hey! Music Champ. This song was included in the compilation album Giza Studio Masterpiece Blend 2001.

In 2001 they've released two singles "Lonesome Tonight" and "Baby My Sunshine". With their second single they've made their final TV appearance on same music program as in October 2000. In October 2001 after year of the debut they've released their first and only studio album Flavor of Life which ranked #28 in Oricon Weekly Charts. On December King Opal has made guest appearance in the GIZA studio R&B PARTY at the "Hills Pan Koujou.

They band hardly ever made any media appearance and occasionally appeared in magazine interviews.

The band has disbanded without any announcement in 2002. The presence of King Opal and Tomomi is unknown after 2002. In 2002 Terao participated as guest member at the Giza Event Hotrod Beach Party. Nowadays he is working actively as a music producer and mentor in the Giza Music School Creators. In credits he's mentioned as an ex.Soul Crusaders.

== Members ==
The members are:

- Tomomi Morishita (森下知美, Morishita Tomomi) - vocalist and lyricist
- King Opal - lyricist, rapper
- Terao Hiroshi (寺尾広, Hiroshi Terao) - composer, leader, keyboard, backing vocals

== Discography ==
During their career they've released 1 studio, 3 singles.

=== Singles ===
	Release date	Title	Oricon chart
1st	12 October 2000	Safety Love	30
2nd	21 February 2001	Lonesome Tonight ~Kimi Dake Mitsumeteru~	59
3rd	8 May 2001	Baby Sweet Sunshine	70

=== Studio albums ===
	Release date	Title	Oricon chart
1st	3 October 2001	Flavor of Life	28

== Magazine appearances ==
From Music Freak Magazine

- Vol.70 2000/9
- Vol.71 2000/10
- Vol.72 2000/11
- Vol.73 2000/12
- Vol.75 2001/2
- Vol.79 2001/6
- Vol.82 2001/9
- Vol.83 2001/10
- Vol.86 2002/1

From J-Groove Magazine:

- December 2000 Vol. 2
- April 2001 Vol. 6
- August 2001 Vol. 10
- November 2001 Vol. 13
