= Yuri Nakamura (singer) =

Japanese musical composer and singer

- Also known as: Yurippe (ゆりっぺ)
- Born: 4 July 1977 (age 49); Japan
- Genres: J-pop
- Occupations: Singer, composer
- Instruments: Vocals, tambourine
- Years active: 1999–2013
- Label: Giza Studio
- Website: garnetcrow.com

Yuri Nakamura (Japanese: 中村由利, Hepburn: Nakamura Yuri) is a Japanese musical composer and singer under Giza Studio label. In years 1999-2013 she was a vocalist and composer of Japanese pop band Garnet Crow.

== History ==
While in school she was interested in composing music and classical artists such as Piotr Il'yich Tchaikovsky and Frédéric Chopin inspired her.

In the winter of 1999, she participated in recording of Eien album by Japanese band Zard as a back vocalist. In beginning of autumn, the earlier formation of her band Garnet Crow began during recording of Mai Kuraki's English language single "Baby I Like". On November, the pre-recorded version of "Mysterious Eyes" was aired on Japanese TV Yomiuri Telecasting Corporation which was used as opening theme for anime television series Detective Conan. In December they released their first mini album First Kaleidscope: Kimi no Uchi ni Tsuku made Zutto Hashitte Yuku under Giza Studio's indies label Tent House.

In March 2000, her band debuted with the major singles "Kimi no Uchi ni Tsuku made Zutto Hashitte Yuku" and "Mysterious Eyes".

In December 2001, she participated in the R&B cover album Giza Studio R&B Respect Vol.1: Six Sisters Selection, covering Tell me by Groove Theory. Few days later after cover album release, she made her first public appearance in live GIZA studio R&B PARTY at the Hills Pan Kōjō along with another Giza artists such as Aiuchi Rina, Mai Kuraki, Ami Matsunaga (The Tambourines), Mami Miyoshi (Rumania Montevideo) and Akiko Matsuda (Ramjet Pulley).

In 2002, she made her first appearance as representative band member in their first live tour First live scope, the DVD footage was released in 2003. In summer she appeared in another Giza Studio summer event, "Giza studio Mai-K & Friends Hotrod Beach Party" where she covered The Little Old Lady (from Pasadena) by Jan & Dean. Recorded version of this song was released in autumn.

In February 2003, along with Japanese singer-songwriters Rina Aiuchi and Mai Kuraki they've appeared in "Giza Studio Valentine Concert". She performed here early songs from her band. There were plans to release DVD footage of concert, however due to unknown reason it was canceled. On the same month she composed song Graduation for Japanese band U-ka Saegusa in dB, the song was included in their debut mini album Secret & Lies. On September, she made her television public appearance on music program Music Station where she performed with Garnet Crow their single "Kimi to Iu Hikari". On October. She participated in collaboration cover single "Imitation Gold" along with Mai Kuraki, covering "Watashi wa Kaze" by Carmen Maki & Oz as coupling song. The producer is Tak Matsumoto from the Japanese rock band B'z. The song was also included in the rock cover album The Hit Parade.

In 2004, she composed for Japanese band Zard song for their album Tomatteita Tokei ga Ima Ugokidashita, Tomatteita Tokei ga Ima Ugokidashita. Zard vocalist, Izumi Sakai performed this song in their first live tour "What a beautiful moment 2004".

In 2005, she composed song for Japanese singer Sayuri Iwata "Sorairo no Neko". She later covered it in Garnet Crow compilation album Best and performed once in their live tour Livescope 2006 - Twilight Valley. It's her last song composed for someone else.

In 2007, she participated recording of Zard first posthumous single "Glorious Mind" in backing vocals. The song was used as opening theme for anime television series Detective Conan.

In 2008, she made special guest appearance in Zard live tour What a Beautiful Memory 2008.

In early 2010 she formed alternative subgroup Miniqlo along with guitarist of Garnet Crow, Hitoshi Okamoto. Their CD releases were limited and only were available during Garnet Crow live tours. The albums consist of re-arranged songs from previously release studio albums by Garnet Crow. On December she has participated in Christmas cover album "Christmas Non-Stop Carol" along with other Giza and Tent House artists covering song Auld Lang Syne. Re-arranged version appears in final Miniqlo album Viento Blanco. On December, during Garnet Crow's Parallel Universe Live Tour, as part of setlist she covered Angels We Have Heard on High, in 2011 it was released on DVD Garnet Crow livescope 2010+ ～Welcome to the Parallel Universe ～.

In 2013 after their final live tour Livescope 2013 -Final-, the band has disbanded. Her presence is unknown since 2013.

== See also ==
- Garnet Crow discography
