= Futari no Rocket =

2000 single by Garnet Crow

"Futari no rocket"

Single by Garnet Crow

from the album First Soundscope: Mizu no Nai Hareta Umi e
- B-side: "Mikansei na neiro"
- Released: May 17, 2000
- Genre: J-pop
- Label: Giza Studio
- Songwriter(s): Yuri Nakamura, Nana Azuki
- Producer(s): Kanonji

Garnet Crow singles chronology
"Kimi no uchi ni tsuku made zutto hashitte yuku" (2000)	"Futari no rocket" (2000)	"Sen ijou no kotoba wo narabete mo..." (2000)

"Futari no rocket" (二人のロケット) is Garnet Crow's third single and was released on May 17, 2000. The song was used as a theme song for the Music Freak TV music channel and reached number 47 on the Oricon chart only for first week.

== Track listing ==
All tracks are composed by Yuri Nakamura, written by Nana Azuki and arranged by Hirohito Furui.

1. Futari no Rocket (二人のロケット)
2. Mikanseina Neiro (未完成な音色)
3. Futari no Rocket(二人のロケット) ~cool smooth ver.~
4. Futari no Rocket (二人のロケット) (Instrumental)
