= Second tune ~Sekai Tomete~ =

Studio album by Shiori Takei
- Released: September 28, 2005
- Recorded: 2005
- Genre: J-pop
- Length: 57:25
- Label: Giza Studio
- Producer: Kanonji

Shiori Takei chronology
My Favorite Things (2004)	Second tune ~Sekai Tomete~ (2005)	Diary (2007)

Singles from Second tune ~Sekai Tomete~
- 1. "Kimi wo Shiranai Machi he" Released: 19 January 2005; 2. "Tsunagari" Released: 6 July 2005; 3. "Sekai Tomete" Released: 10 August 2005

Second tune ~Sekai Tomete~ (second tune 〜世界 止めて〜) was the Shiori Takei's 2nd studio album, released on September 28, 2005 under Giza Studio label.

== Background ==
The album consists of three previous released singles, Kimi wo Shiranai Machi he, Tsunagari and Sekai Tomete. Limited releases included Studio Live version of "Kimi wo Shiranai Machi he".

== Commercial performance ==
The album charted at No. 49 on the Oricon charts in its first week. The album charted for four weeks and sold 9,287 copies.

== Track listing ==
All songs has been written by Shiori Takei

No.	Title	Music	Arrangers	Length
1.	"Sekai Tomete]" (世界 止めて -it's the most successful song during her career)	Aika Ohno	Satoru Kobayashi	4:18
2.	"Tonari" (となり)	Ohno	Kobayashi	5:01
3.	"Kimi wo Shiranai Machi he" (君を知らない街へ)	Ohno	Kobayashi	4:34
4.	"Utakata" (うたかた)	Kouji Gotou	Amaoto Laala	3:35
5.	"Reflection"	Kenta Takamori	Dr. Terachi＆Pierrot Le Fou	4:51
6.	"and it's over"	Toshio Tomita	Kobayashi	5:05
7.	"slow step"	Akihito Tokunaga (Doa)	Taishi Ozeki	3:23
8.	"Kuchinashi" (くちなし)	Kouji Gotou		4:10
9.	"new day"	Tokunaga	Bonn	3:59
10.	"Lost In Paradise"	Ohno	Kobayashi	5:16
11.	"Tsunagari" (つながり)	Ohno	Kobayashi	5:13
12.	"Puzzle" (パズル)	Kouji Gotou	Hirohito Furui (Garnet Crow)	4:06
13.	"Sekai Tomete" (世界 止めて piano instrumental ver.)	Kouji Gotou		2:37

== Use in media ==
- Sekai Tomete was used as ending theme for TV anime Detective Conan
- Kimi wo Shiranai Machi he: theme song for Nihon TV program "Shiodome Style!"
