= Flavor of Life (disambiguation) =

"Flavor of Life" is Hikaru Utada's 18th Japanese single.

Flavor of Life, may also refer to:

- Flavor of Life (含笑食堂), a Taiwanese TV series
- Flavor of Life (album), the first and only studio album by Japanese pop unit Soul Crusaders

== See also ==
- Flavor of Love, an American reality television dating game show
