= Kimi ni Koishiteru =

Single by Shiori Takei

from the album My Favorite Things
- Released: May 19, 2004
- Genre: J-Pop
- Length: 17 minutes
- Label: Giza Studio
- Songwriters: Nana Azuki, Kouji Gotou

Shiori Takei singles chronology
"Shizukanaru Melody" (2004)	"Kimi ni Koishiteru" (2004)	"Kimi wo Shiranai Machi he" (2005)

"Kimi ni Koishiteru (君に恋してる)" is the second single by Shiori Takei and released May 19, 2004 under Giza Studio label. The single reached #90 rank first week. It charted for 1 weeks and sold over 1,292 copies.

== Track listing ==
No.	Title	Lyrics	Music	Arrangers	Length
1.	"Kimi ni Koishiteru" (君に恋してる)	Nana Azuki (Garnet Crow)	Kouji Gotou	Satoru Kobayashi	3:47
2.	"Yuunagi" (夕凪)	Azuki	Hitoshi Okamoto (Garnet Crow)	Dr.Terachi & Pierrot Le Fou	4:46
3.	"River"	Shiori Takei	Kouji Gotou	Satoru Kobayashi	4:10
4.	"Kimi ni Koishiteru" (less vocal)				3:47
