= Eisuke Mochizuki =

Japanese composer and pianist

Eisuke Mochizuki 望月 衛介
- Born: Mamoru Mochizuki (望月 衛); October 27, 1970 (age 55); Tokyo, Japan
- Genres: J-pop, New Age, Healing Music
- Occupations: pianist, keyboardist, composer, producer, director, artist
- Years active: 1990–1997; 2008–present
- Labels: Being Inc.; Turtle Music Inc.
- Website: Official website

YouTube information
- Channel: eisukemochizukitv 望月衛介
- Years active: 2008–present
- Subscribers: 6.52 thousand
- Views: 2.39 million
- Last updated: August 4, 2026

Eisuke Mochizuki (望月衛介, Mochizuki Eisuke; born October 1970, in Tokyo, Japan), birth name Mamoru Mochizuki, is a Japanese pianist, composer, npo director, producer and former member of the pop group B.B.Queens.

== Biography ==
At the age of 4, he started learn to play on piano. During his high school days, he formed and was a member of a school band. In the beginning of the 1990, during the same time when he started going to college, he made solo major debut with the instrumental album Waitin'for You under BMG Victor label and became the member of the group B.B. Queens, whom they won 32nd Japan Record Award and appeared in the national new-year program Kōhaku Uta Gassen. In 1993, he graduated from the Keio University. From 1994, he started his activities as a composer for Zard, Yuiko Tsubokura, Hiromi Go, and many other artist. He remained active and released solo works in the Being Inc. until 1997, when he decided to leave music industry and focus to work for Dentsu company. In 2008, he has announced through his blog site complete resume of his music activities. In 2010, he established the nonprofit organization "Donation Music" in which they are doing social contribution activities through music. He is credited as director under his born name Mamoru. As of 2023, he is active and primarily focus on composing original songs and uploading piano cover songs on his social media accounts.

== Discography ==
As of 2023, he has released 11 studio albums, 8 digital albums and 1 compilation album.

=== Studio albums ===
	Release date	Title	CD code
0th	1990	Waitin' for you	BVCR-17
1st	1993	Still I love you	BMCR-6002
2nd	1994	Ai to Kanashimi no Hate ni (愛と哀しみの果てに)	BMCR-6014
3rd	1997	Love & Healing	BMCR-7013
4th	2003	SWEET SLOW LOVE	–
5th	2005	Mangetsu: Fuyu (満月～ふゆ～)	TMRC-2
6th	2005	Watashi no Naka no 8 millimeter Soundtrack (私のなかの8ミリサウンドトラック)	BNTM-1
7th	2005	SWEET SLOW LOVE+	TMRC-3
8th	2010	Reminiscence: Tsuioku (REMINISCENCE〜追憶〜)	BNTM-2
9th	2012	Piano Romance	BNTM-3
10th	2021	Mangetsu: Aki (満月～あき～)	–

=== Compilation albums ===
	Release date	Title	Code
1st	2015	Best of Melodies Pop Collection/Best of Melodies Ballad collection	BNTM-0005, BNTM-0004

=== Digital EP ===
	Release date	Title
1st	2021	Yasashii Asa (やさしい朝)
2nd	2021	Nagareru youni (流れのように)
3rd	2021	Haru, Moyuru (春、萌ゆる)
4th	2021	Sakurairo Somaru koro: Sakura Colors (サクラ色、染まる頃)
5th	2021	Peace of mind
6th	2021	Tell the truth
7th	2021	Journey to love
8th	2021	Under the stars

=== Soundtracks compositions ===
- Seamless: Kidz Rule (credited as Mamoru Mochizuki)
- Tasogare Ryuuseigun: Hoshi furu Hotaru
- Watashi no Naka no 8 millimeter Soundtrack (私のなかの8ミリサウンドトラック)

== Compositions for artist ==
All the informations are from his personal biographical page on official website.

- Zard: Tooi hi no Nostalgia (遠い日のNostalgia) (from the album Hold Me)
- Go Hiromi: Ai no Vampire (愛のバンパイア) (from the album One and Only...), Kimi ga Nakeru Basho ni Naru (君が泣ける場所になる)
- Ayumi Sakai: Koizaki (恋咲き), Kanashimi wo Aishisade (悲しみを愛しさで)
- Shiori Takei: Yuugure no Ame to (from single Sekai Tomete)
- Aiko Yanagihara: Omoideno Kakre (from album Innocent color)
- Yuiko Tsubokura: Hitotoki no Yume ni Dakarete (ひとときの夢に抱かれて) (from album Devious)
- B.B.Queens: Love Suteki na Bokura (LOVE 素敵な僕ら)
- Takuya Matsuoka: Donna funny (どんなふうに)
- Shino Nakamura: Make a Wish
- Minami Kizuki: Zutto Zutto (ずっとずっと)
- Seiko Niizuma: Ai no Hito (愛のひと)
- Hiroyuki Ehara: Dark no Tameni (誰かのために)
- Saki Fukuda: Ashita Ame ga Agaru koro ni ha (明日雨が上がるころには)
- Aiko Okumura: Giniro no Ame (銀色の雨)
- Hekiru Shiina: Love Graduation, Ai no Katachi (愛のカタチ), LOVIN' YOU
