= Sounds Good ~Himekuri Shashin~ =

Studio album by The Tambourines
- Released: November 2, 2005
- Recorded: 2004–2005
- Genre: J-pop
- Length: 42:49
- Label: Giza Studio
- Producer: The Tambourines

The Tambourines chronology
Home Again (2003)	Sounds Good ~Himekuri Shashin~ (2005)

Singles from Home Again
- 1. "Never ever ~Aki ha Chotto Samishiku~" Released: September 8, 2004; 2. "Don't stop music" Released: August 31, 2005

Sounds Good ~Himekuri Shashin~ (sounds good〜日めくり写真〜) is the fourth studio album by Japanese pop band The Tambourines. It was released on November 2, 2005, almost two years after the release of Home Again through Giza Studio.

== Background ==
The album consists of two previous released singles, such as "Never ever ~Aki ha Chotto Samishiku~" and "Don't stop the music".

"Never ever" received special mix under title album version. The composer of Don't stop the music, Aika Ohno self-cover this single in her cover album Silent Passage.

Nine songs out of the eleven were composed by band themselves.

The album consists of a total of 11 tracks, making it the longest studio album in their history.

This is their last studio album. They continued to release only mini albums.

== Chart performance ==
The album charted at No. 270 on the Oricon charts in its first week. It charted for one week.

== Track listing ==
All the tracks are arranged by Hiroshi Asai

All lyrics are written by Ami Matsunaga; all music is composed by Hiroshi Asai (expect track #1, by Aika Ohno and track #3, by Makoto Miyoshi (ex.Rumania Montevideo)).

No.	Title	Length
1.	"Don't stop music"	4:21
2.	"Yofukashi Rendezvous (夜更かしランデヴー)"	4:02
3.	"Never ever ~Aki ha Chotto Samishiku~ (never ever〜秋はちょっとさみしく〜)" (album mix)	4:09
4.	"Haru Natsu Aki Fuyu (夜春・夏・秋・冬)"	4:32
5.	"Iro (色)"	3:55
6.	"Letter"	4:32
7.	"Sekai no Tsuzuki (セカイのつづき)"	3:58
8.	"Asai"	2:28
9.	"Tooi Machi (とおいまち)"	3:58
10.	"Neverland (ネバーランド)"	3:14
11.	"Utatane (うたたね)"	3:44

== In media ==
- Never ever ~Aki ha Chotto Samishiku~: ending theme for Nihon TV program Coming Doubt (カミングダウト)
- Don't stop music: ending theme for Tokyo Broadcasting System Television program Azaassu!
