= My Back Pages (album) =

Studio album by The Tambourines
- Released: September 28, 2002
- Recorded: 2001–2002
- Genre: J-pop
- Length: 31:40
- Label: Giza Studio
- Producer: The Tambourines

The Tambourines chronology
My Back Pages (2002)	Dizzy Season (2003)

Singles from My Back Pages
- 1. "Easy game" Released: 25 April 2001; 2. "Hijack brandnew days" Released: 18 July 2001; 3. "Mayonaka ni Kizuita funny love" Released: 31 October 2001; 4. "Stay young" Released: 20 March 2002

My back pages is the debut studio album by Japanese pop band The Tambourines. It was released on September 28, 2002, through Giza Studio.

== Background ==
The album consists of four previous released singles, such as "Easy game", "Hijack brandnew days", "Mayonaka ni Kizuita Funny Love" (真夜中気づいたfunny love) and "Stay Young".

Three songs out of ten were composed by band themselves.

The single Easy Game was released in the Giza Studio's compilation album Giza Studio Masterpiece Blend 2001 and Stay young in the compilation album Giza Studio Masterpiece Blend 2002.

== Chart performance ==
The album peaked at No. 86 on the Oricon charts in its first week. It charted for 1 week and sold 2,750 copies. It was their only album which entered into Top 100 Oricon rankings.

== Track listing ==
All lyrics are written by Ami Matsunaga

No.	Title	Music	Arrangers	Length
1.	"Easy game"	Aika Ohno	Hirohito Furui (Garnet Crow)	3:44
2.	"Stay young"	Akihito Tokunaga	Tokunaga	3:52
3.	"Mayonaka ni Kizuita Funny Love (真夜中気づいたfunny love)"	Makoto Miyoshi (ex.Rumania Montevideo)	Furui	3:49
4.	"Clover (クローバー)"	Hiroshi Asai	Asai	4:12
5.	"Love flower"	Ami Matsunaga	Furui	4:25
6.	"Hijack brandnew days"	Ohno	Furui	3:25
7.	"Star"	Daria Kawashima	Furui	4:47
8.	"My back pages"	Matsunaga	Furui	3:29

== In media ==
- My back pages - theme song for YTV program Asa Ichi!
- Stay young - ending theme for Tokyo Broadcasting System Television program Oujisama no Branch
