= First Kaleidscope: Kimi no Uchi ni Tsuku made Zutto Hashitte Yuku =

EP by Garnet Crow
- Released: December 4, 1999
- Recorded: 1999
- Studio: Red Way Studio
- Genre: J-pop
- Length: 26:28
- Label: Tent House
- Producers: Garnet Crow; Kanonji

Garnet Crow chronology
First Kaleidscope: Kimi no Uchi ni Tsuku made Zutto Hashitte Yuku (1999)	First Soundscope: Mizu no Nai Hareta Umi e (2001)

Singles from First Kaleidscope: Kimi no Uchi ni Tsuku made Zutto Hashitte Yuku
- 1. "Kimi no Uchi ni Tsuku made Zutto Hashitte Yuku" Released: 29 March 2000; 2. "Futari no Rocket" Released: 17 May 2000

First Kaleidscope ~Kimi no Uchi ni Tsuku made Zutto Hashitte Yuku~ is the first mini album by Japanese group Garnet Crow. The mini album was released on December 4, 1999, by indies music label Tent House. The album includes early recordings of following singles Futari no Rocket and Kimi no Uchi ni Tsuku made Zutto Hashitte Yuku.

== Background ==
It's the first release by Being indies label Tent House.

The recording of the album has started in the fall and finished within the span of less than two months. The album was pre-released on 27 November 1999 with the small number of copies and first edition of track set-list.

Album track A crown has appeared in their compilation album The Best History of Garnet Crow at the crest in 2010 and re-arranged version of Sky in compilation album Best in 2005.

There were plans to release second mini album Popper-plazma, however for unknown reasons it was never released. Later, in live documentary of DVD Kimi to Iu Hikari, was Okamoto asked by interviewer about unreleased album, and he answered "The most of the tracks has been released in the studio album Soundscope". No further comment has been added regarding this question.

At the present, the album is out of print and is available on Apple Music.

== Promotion ==
=== Singles ===
Album tracks Futari no Rocket and Kimi no Uchi ni Tsuku made Zutto Hashitte Yuku were recorded in their first studio album First Soundscope: Mizu no Nai Hareta Umi e in 2001.

While Futari no Rocket doesn't include big musical change, Kimi no Uchi ni Tsuku made Zutto Hashitte Yuku had an arrangement change: although they both start with the guitar solo intro with different chords and has a same length, after guitar solo in indies version goes straight to the A melody, while the re-newed version of the song starts with English chorus.

== Track listing ==
All tracks are composed by Yuri Nakamura, written by Nana Azuki and arranged by Hirohito Furui.

No.	Title	Length
1.	"Kimi no Uchi ni Tsuku made Zutto Hashitte Yuku" (君の家に着くまでずっと走ってゆく)	4:08
2.	"Futari no Rocket" (二人のロケット)	4:44
3.	"Sky"	4:26
4.	"Dreaming of love"	4:07
5.	"Towa ni Nemure" (永遠に葬れ)	3:56
6.	"A crown"	5:12

The song "永遠に葬れ" on No.5 is usually read as "Eien ni Houmure," but it is actually sung as "Towa ni Nemure".

== Personnel ==
Credits adapted from the CD booklet of First Kaleidscope: Kimi no Uchi ni Tsuku Made Zutto Hashitte Yuku.

- Yuri Nakamura - vocals, composing
- Azuki Nana - lyrics, keyboard, cover photo
- Hirohito Furui - arranging, keyboard
- Hitoshi Okamoto - guitar
- Kanonji - executive producing
- Red Way Studio - recording, mixing
