= Sakurairo =

Sakurairo may refer to:

- "Sakurairo" (Angela Aki song), 2007
- "Sakurairo" (Shiori Takei song), 2006

== See also ==
- Cherry blossom pink
