= Flavor of Life (album) =

Flavor Of Life

Studio album by Soul Crusaders
- Released: October 3, 2001
- Recorded: 2000–2001
- Studio: Red Way Studio, Studio Birdman
- Genre: J-pop, soul
- Length: 54:15
- Label: Giza Studio
- Producer: Kanonji

Singles from Flavor of Life
- 1. "Safety Love" Released: October 12, 2000; 2. "Lonesome Tonight ~Kimi dake Mitsumeteru~" Released: February 21, 2001; 3. "Baby Sweet Sunshine" Released: June 27, 2001

Flavor of Life is the first and only studio album by Japanese pop unit Soul Crusaders. It was released on October 3, 2001, through Giza Studio.

== Background ==
The album consists of three previous released singles, such as "Safety Love", "Lonesome Tonight ~Kimi dake Mitsumeteru~" (Lonesome Tonight 〜君だけみつめてる〜) and "Baby Sweet Sunshine".

The lyricist and keyboardist of Japanese pop band Garnet Crow, Nana Azuki and Giza composer Aika Ohno were involved with the album production.

The single Safety Love was released in the Giza Studio's compilation album Giza Studio Masterpiece Blend 2001, it was released again in compilation album GIZA studio presents -Girls- which released in 2011.

This is their last music release. In 2002, they disbanded.

== Chart performance ==
The album charted at No. 28 on the Oricon charts in its first week. It charted for three weeks and sold more than 13,280 copies.

== Track listing ==
All the songs were arranged by Hiroshi Terao

No.	Title	Lyrics	Music	Length
1.	"Safety Love"	Nana Azuki (Garnet Crow)	Aika Ohno	4:12
2.	"Baby Sweet Sunshine"	Tomomi Morishita, King Opal	Ohno	4:43
3.	"Kanshou (感傷)"	Azuki, Opal	Terao Hiroshi	4:27
4.	"Free my mind"	Azuki, Opal	Hiroshi	4:32
5.	"Lonesome Tonight ~Kimi Dake Mitsumeteru~ (Lonesome Tonight 〜君だけみつめてる〜)"	Azuki	Ohno	5:55
6.	"I miss you"	Morishita, Opal	Hiroshi	4:38
7.	"Feel my heart"	Morishita, Opal	Hiroshi	4:11
8.	"Resolution"	Azuki, Opal	Hiroshi	3:56
9.	"Get Positive"	Opal	Hiroshi	3:47
10.	"Do you feel like I like?"	Azuki, Opal	Hiroshi	4:40
11.	"Holiday"	Azuki, Opal	Hiroshi	4:29
12.	"Omoide wa Hana (オモイデハ花)"	Sayaka Takasaki, Opal	Hiroshi	4:32
Total length:				54:15

== Personnel ==
Credits adapted from the CD booklet of Flavor of Life".

- Tomomi Morishita – vocalist, lyricist
- King Opal – lyricist, rap
- Hiroshi Terao – composing, arranging, backing vocals, keyboard
- Aika Ohno – composing
- Nana Azuki (Garnet Crow) – composing
- Sayaka Takasaki – composing
- Dr.Terachi&Dj Me-Ya – programming, keyboard
- Takashi Masuzaki (Dimension) – guitar
- Secil Minami – backing vocals
- Mika Katsuta – backing vocals
- Rika Takeuchi – backing vocals
- Toshihide Nakai – backing vocals
- Sawako Ryuko – mixing, digital sound design
- Tatsuya Okada – recording
- Masahiro Shimada – mastering
- Birdman Mastering – mastering
- Toshiyuki Ebihara – artist repertory
- Shinichi Takagi – artist relation
- Emi Akuzawa – artist relation
- Makoto Iwasawa – artist relation
- Ayako Asada – production management
- Toshinobu Iwata – artist management
- Takehiko Kawasaki – artist management
- Katsuyuki Yoshimatsu – assistant engineering
- Gan Kojima – art direction, design
- Kanonji – producing
