= Sekai Tomete =

Single by Shiori Takei

from the album Second tune ~Sekai Tomete~
- Released: August 10, 2005
- Genre: J-pop
- Length: 17 minutes
- Label: Giza Studio
- Songwriters: Aika Ohno, Shiori Takei

Shiori Takei singles chronology
"Tsunagari" (2005)	"Sekai Tomete" (2005)	"Sakurairo" (2006)

"Sekai Tomete" (世界 止めて) is the fifth single by Shiori Takei and released August 10, 2005 under Giza Studio label. Her second album, Second tune had this title as part of the name of the album. The single reached #27th in the first week. It charted for 6 weeks and sold over 13,820 copies. This is the most successful song during her career.

== Track listing ==
All lyrics are written by Shiori Takei

No.	Title	Music	Arrangers	Length
1.	"Sekai Tomete" (世界 止めて)	Aika Ohno	Satoru Kobayashi	4:21
2.	"Tsuioku" (追憶)	Kouji Gotou	Kouji Gotou	3:49
3.	"Yuugure no Ame to" (夕暮れの雨と)	Eisuke Mochizuki	Satoru Kobayashi	4:32
4.	"Sekai Tomete" (less vocal)			4:18

== Use in media ==
The song, "Sekai Tomete" was used as ending theme for anime Detective Conan
