= Kimi wo Shiranai Machi he =

Single by Shiori Takei

from the album Second tune ~Sekai Tomete~
- Released: January 19, 2005
- Genre: J-pop
- Length: 19 minutes
- Label: Giza Studio
- Songwriter(s): Aika Ohno, Satoru Kobayashi

Shiori Takei singles chronology
"Kimi ni Koishiteru" (2004)	"Kimi wo Shiranai Machi he" (2005)	"Tsunagari" (2005)

"Kimi wo Shiranai Machi he (君を知らない街へ)" is the third single by Shiori Takei and released January 19, 2005 under Giza Studio label. The single reached #70 rank first week. It charted for 2 weeks and sold over 2,277 copies.

== Track listing ==
All lyrics are written by Shiori Takei

Kimi wo Shiranai Machi he
No.	Title	Music	Arrangers	Length
1.	"Kimi wo Shiranai Machi he" (君を知らない街へ)	Aika Ohno	Satoru Kobayashi	4:39
2.	"your warmth"	Kouji Gotou	Satoru Kobayashi	4:16
3.	"Reflection"	Kouji Gotou	Dr. Terachi, Pierrot Le Fou	4:56
4.	"Kimi wo Shiranai Machi he" (less vocal)			4:38
