= Tsunagari =

Single by Shiori Takei

from the album Second tune ~Sekai Tomete~
- Released: July 6, 2005
- Genre: J-pop
- Length: 19 minutes
- Label: Giza Studio

Shiori Takei singles chronology
"Kimi wo Shiranai Machi he" (2005)	"Tsunagari" (2005)	"Sekai Tomete" (2005)

"Tsunagari (つながり)" is the fourth single by Shiori Takei. It was released on the 6th of July, 2005 under the Giza Studio label. The single reached #99 rank first week. It charted for 2 weeks and sold over 2,208 copies.

== Track listing ==
All lyrics are written by Shiori Takei

No.	Title	Music	Arrangers	Length
1.	"Tsunagari" (つながり)	Aika Ohno	Satoru Kobayashi	5:16
2.	"Drive"	Kousuke Ohshima	Yuuya Saka	3:35
3.	"Voice" (ボイス)	Maki Imai	Satoru Kobayashi	4:55
4.	"Tsunagari" (less vocal)			4:38
