= Yume no Tsuzuki =

Single by Shiori Takei

from the album Diary
- Released: February 28, 2007
- Genre: J-pop
- Label: Giza Studio
- Composer(s): Kouji Goto
- Lyricist(s): Shiori Takei
- Producer(s): Shiori Takei

Shiori Takei singles chronology
"Like a little Love" (2006)	"Yume no Tsuzuki" (2007)

"Yume no Tsuzuki" (夢のつづき) is the ninth and final single by Shiori Takei, released on February 28, 2007, under the Giza Studio label. The single reached #94 rank first week. It charted for one week and sold over 1,385 copies.

== Track listing ==
All songs has been written by Shiori Takei

1. Yume no Tsuzuki (夢のつづき)
  - composer: Kouji Goto/arranger: Satoru Kobayashi
2. Byebye Lullaby (バイバイ ララバイ)
  - composer: Nao Kimura/arranger: NAKEDGRUN
3. Yume no Tsuzuki (夢のつづき) (less vocal)
