= Mysterious Eyes =

2000 single by Garnet Crow

Single by Garnet Crow

from the album First Soundscope: Mizu no Nai Hareta Umi e
- B-side: "Timing"
- Released: March 29, 2000
- Genre: J-Pop
- Label: Giza Studio
- Songwriter(s): Yuri Nakamura, Nana Azuki
- Producer(s): Kanonji

Garnet Crow singles chronology
"Mysterious Eyes" (2000)	"Kimi no uchi ni tsuku made zutto hashitte yuku" (2000)

"Mysterious Eyes" is one of Garnet Crow's two debut singles that was released on March 29, 2000. The two release marks the signing of band with the Giza Studio record label. The other single that was a part of this release was "Kimi no uchi ni tsuku made zutto hashitte yuku". "Mysterious Eyes" was used as the seventh opening theme for Case Closed in Japan and had a direct impact on helping it score in the 20th position on the Oricon chart. The song has some alternate versions too, those being "Mysterious Eyes ~dry flavor of G mix~" from the album "SPARKLE ~Sujigakidoori no Skyblue~", and, more recently, guitarist Okamoto Hitoshi created a version called "Mysterious Eyes ~Reason P.~", available for download using a QR code card included in his album "Now Printing...". The single reached #20 rank for first week. It charted for 11 weeks.

== Track listing ==
All tracks are composed by Yuri Nakamura, written by Nana Azuki and arranged by Hirohito Furui.

1. Mysterious Eyes
  - the song was used as intro theme for anime Detective Conan
2. Timing
3. Mysterious Eyes (Instrumental version) - 4:29

== Release history ==
Region	Date	Format
Japan	March 29, 2000	CD single
