= The Twilight Valley =

Studio album by Garnet Crow
- Released: October 4, 2006
- Recorded: 2005–2006
- Genre: J-pop
- Length: 59:30
- Label: Giza Studio
- Producer: Garnet Crow; Kanonji

Garnet Crow chronology
Best (2005)	The Twilight Valley (2006)	Locks (2008)

Singles from The Twilight Valley
- 1. "'Haredokei" Released: November 23, 2005; 2. "Rai Rai Ya" Released: March 1, 2006; 3. "Yume Hanabi" Released: July 5, 2006; 4. "Koyoi Eden no Katasumi de" Released: August 16, 2006; 5. "Maboroshi" Released: September 13, 2006

The Twilight Valley is the fifth studio album by Japanese group Garnet Crow. It was released on October 4, 2006, by Giza Studio.

== Background ==
The album includes five previously released singles.

Maboroshi has received new album mix under title album arr. Compared to the original single version, lyrics are performed in different ways and the melodies have a more psychedelic tuning.

The single Kimi no Omoi Egaita Yume Atsumeru Heaven is not included in this album, instead appearing in their first compilation album Best.

This is their first studio album which was released in two formats: regular CD edition and limited edition CD+DVD. The DVD disc contains 15 minutes of digest footage of their live performance Garnet Crow Premium Live -happy 5th anniversary-.

This is one of the two GARNET CROW studio albums (the other being Terminus) not to feature a theme song from Detective Conan. Three songs, however, were included in Anime television series MÄR.

== Chart performance ==
"The Twilight Valley" made its chart debut on the official Oricon Albums Chart at No. 4 with first week sales of 36,060 copies. It charted for eight weeks, selling a total of 58,190 copies.

== Track listing ==
All tracks are composed by Yuri Nakamura, written by Nana Azuki and arranged by Hirohito Furui.

No.	Title	Length
1.	"Anywhere"	4:41
2.	"Maboroshi (まぼろし)" (album arr.)	4:18
3.	"Koyoi Eden no Katasumi de (今宵エデンの片隅で)"	4:32
4.	"Rusty Rail"	3:46
5.	"Yume Hanabi (夢・花火)"	3:59
6.	"Kakurenbo (かくれんぼ)"	3:23
7.	"Himawari no Iro (向日葵の色)"	5:03
8.	"Haredokei (晴れ時計)"	4:12
9.	"Marginal Man (マージナルマン)"	4:11
10.	"Rai Rai Ya (籟・来・也)"	3:22
11.	"Yellow Moon"	4:22
12.	"Mou Chotto Sagashite Mimashou (もうちょっとサガシテみましょう)"	4:18
13.	"Haru Matsu Hana no you ni (春待つ花のように)"	4:55
14.	"Weekend"	4:39

== Personnel ==
Credits adapted from the CD booklet of The Twilight Valley.

- Yuri Nakamura - vocals, backing vocals, composing
- Nana Azuki - songwriting, keyboard
- Hirohito Furui - arranging, keyboard
- Hitoshi Okamoto - acoustic guitar, bass
- Miguel Sa' Pessoa - arranging
- Katsuyuki Yoshimatu - recording engineering
- Aki Morimoto - recording engineering
- Akio Nakajima - mixing engineering
- Minoru Toyoda - mixing engineering
- Masahiro Shimada - mastering engineering
- Gan Kojima - art direction
- Yasuhiro Itakura - art direction
- Kanonji - executive producer

== Tie up ==
- Haredokei: opening theme for Anime television series MÄR
- Rai Rai Ya: image song in TBS in program Canon Specials
- Yume Hanabi: opening theme for Anime television series MÄR
- Koyoi Eden no Katasumi de: ending theme for Anime television series MÄR
- Maboroshi: theme song for Japanese television drama Shin: Kasouken no Onna
