= Sakurairo (Shiori Takei song) =

Single by Shiori Takei

from the album Diary
- Released: February 1, 2006
- Genre: J-pop
- Label: Giza Studio
- Songwriters: Nana Azuki, Keika

Shiori Takei singles chronology
"Sekai Tomete" (2005)	"Sakurairo" (2006)	"Kitto mou Koi ni wa Naranai" (2006)

"Sakurairo (桜色)" is the sixth single by Shiori Takei and released February 1, 2006, under Giza Studio label. The single reached #56 rank first week. It charted for 3 weeks and sold over 3,737 copies.

== Track list ==
All songs has been arranged by Satoru Kobayashi

1. Sakurairo (桜色)
  - lyricist: Nana Azuki (Garnet Crow)/composer: Keika
    - the song was used as ending theme for anime MÄR
2. Zanzou (残像)
  - lyricist: Shiori Takei/composer: Maki Imai
3. Aru Hi no Asa ni (或る日の朝に)
  - lyricist and composer: Shiori Takei
  - it's Shiori's first composed song
4. Sakurairo (桜色) (less vocal)
