= Parallel Universe (Garnet Crow album) =

Studio album by Garnet Crow
- Released: December 8, 2010
- Recorded: 2010
- Genre: J-Pop
- Length: 45:46
- Label: Giza Studio
- Producer: Garnet Crow

Garnet Crow chronology
| Stay: Yoake no Soul (2009) | Parallel Universe (2010) | Memories (2011) |

Singles from Parallel Universe
- 1. "Over Drive" Released: April 14, 2010

Parallel Universe is the eighth studio album by Japanese group Garnet Crow. The album was released on December 8, 2010, by Giza Studio.

== Background ==
The lead single, "Over Drive", was released on April 14, 2010. The album's limited edition comes with a DVD of the band's concert, "GARNET CROW Symphonic Concert 2010 ~All Lovers~" conducted by Ikurō Fujiwara.

== Chart performance ==
The album reached #10 rank in Oricon for first week with 15,773 sold copies. It charted for 7 weeks and sold 22,911 copies.

== Track listing ==
All tracks are composed by Yuri Nakamura, written by Nana Azuki and arranged by Hirohito Furui.

Parallel Universe
| No. | Title | Length |
|---|---|---|
| 1. | "Aozora Kanata (アオゾラ カナタ)" | 5:20 |
| 2. | "As the Dew ~album version~" | 4:29 |
| 3. | "Over Drive" | 4:27 |
| 4. | "Tell Me Something" | 4:59 |
| 5. | "Mayoi no Mori (迷いの森)" | 4:03 |
| 6. | "Sora ni Hanabi (空に花火) ~orchestra session~" | 4:35 |
| 7. | "Nagisa to Secret Days (渚とシークレットデイズ)" | 4:24 |
| 8. | "The Crack-up" | 5:09 |
| 9. | "Strangers" | 4:39 |
| 10. | "Kyou to Asu to (今日と明日と)" | 3:46 |
| 11. | "Over Drive ~theater version~*" |

Note

- Only released on regular edition.

== Use in other media ==
- Tell Me Something was used as the ending theme for the TV show "Tonari no Terekin-chan"
- Sora ni Hanabi was used as the ending theme for TBS program Uwasa no! Tokyo Magazine
- As the Dew was used as the opening theme for anime Detective Conan
- Over Drive was used as the theme song for anime movie Detective Conan: The Lost Ship in the Sky
