= Kimi no Uchi ni Tsuku made Zutto Hashitte Yuku =

2000 single by Garnet Crow

"Kimi no uchi ni tsuku made zutto hashitte yuku"

Single by Garnet Crow

from the album First Soundscope: Mizu no Nai Hareta Umi e
- B-side: "in little time"
- Released: March 29, 2000
- Genre: J-pop
- Label: Giza Studio
- Songwriter(s): Yuri Nakamura, Nana Azuki
- Producer(s): Kanonji

Garnet Crow singles chronology
"Mysterious Eyes" (2000)	"Kimi no uchi ni tsuku made zutto hashitte yuku" (2000)	"Futari no rocket" (2000)

"Kimi no uchi ni tsuku made zutto hashitte yuku" (君の家に着くまでずっと走ってゆく) is a song by Garnet Crow, which was released as one of their two debut singles - which they released on the same day, March 29, 2000, after being signed record label Giza Studio. The arrangement of the title track on this single is significantly more mellow than what was on their indie album and is the version that they have released on subsequent albums and performed in concerts. The single charted #40 rank for first week.

== Track listing ==
All tracks are composed by Yuri Nakamura, written by Nana Azuki and arranged by Hirohito Furui.

1. Kimi no uchi ni tsuku made zutto hashitte yuku (君の家に着くまでずっと走ってゆく)
2. in little time
3. Kimi no uchi ni tsuku made zutto hashitte yuku (君の家に着くまでずっと走ってゆく) (instrumental)
