= Detective Conan: The Lost Ship in the Sky =

- Theatrical release poster
- Kanji: 名探偵コナン 天空の難破船(ロスト・シップ)
- Revised Hepburn: Meitantei Konan: Tenkū no Rosuto Shippu
- Directed by: Yasuichiro Yamamoto
- Written by: Kazunari Kochi
- Based on: Case Closed by Gosho Aoyama
- Produced by: Masahito Yoshioka; Michihiko Suwa
- Starring: Minami Takayama; Kappei Yamaguchi; Rikiya Koyama; Wakana Yamazaki; Megumi Hayashibara; Ryo Horikawa; Yuko Miyamura; Naoko Matsui; Yukiko Iwai; Ikue Ohtani; Wataru Takagi; Kenichi Ogata; Nagai Ichirou; Chafurin; Atsuko Yuya; Isshin Chiba
- Cinematography: Takashi Nomura
- Edited by: Terumitsu Okada
- Music by: Katsuo Ono
- Production company: TMS Entertainment
- Distributed by: Toho
- Release date: April 17, 2010
- Running time: 102 minutes
- Country: Japan
- Language: Japanese
- Box office: ¥ 3.1 billion (US$ 31.4 million)

Detective Conan: The Lost Ship in the Sky (名探偵コナン 天空の難破船(ロスト・シップ), Meitantei Konan: Tenkū no Rosuto Shippu) is the 2010 Japanese animated action thriller film and the fourteenth film installment of the Case Closed manga and anime series. The film was released on April 17, 2010, in Japan.

This film is confirmed to have Kaito Kid involved in it after his last appearance in The Private Eyes' Requiem. This film earned 3.1 billion yen in the domestic Japanese box office. The film aired on NNS on April 15, 2011, along with the third drama to celebrate the fifteenth anniversary of the Case Closed anime series. It aired again on August 17, 2012.

== Plot ==
A terrorist group invades a laboratory containing a deadly bacteria and destroys the lab with an explosion. They later announce via the internet that they have gained possession of the bacteria and declare themselves to be the Red Siamese Cats (赤いシャムネコ, Akai Shamu Neko), a terrorist group that was eradicated a decade ago.

Conan Edogawa, Kogoro, Ran Mouri and the Detective Boys are invited by Sonoko Suzuki's uncle, Jirokichi, to fly in his airship to witness his attempt at capturing Kaito Kid by baiting him with the jewel called Lady Sky (レディー スカイ, Redī Sukai). Kid replies to Jirokichi's challenge with a letter announcing that he will steal Lady Sky when the airship approaches Osaka. Aboard the airship, besides its employees and the police, there are four others who are working for the media: Takamichi Fujioka, a journalist; Masaki Mizukawa, a TV director; Kasumi Nishitani, a reporter; and Junpei Ishimoto, a cameraman. Meanwhile, a waitress enters the smoking room where an ampoule with the logo of the Red Siamese Cats is seen under the sofa. Conan reminisces to Dr. Hiroshi Agasa about the time Ran thought an airship was an unidentified flying object and asks him to keep it a secret. A waiter overhears Conan in the shadows.

Conan's group is given a tour of the airship; Ran diverges from the group to get a better look at Lady Sky. She meets a waiter wearing a bandage similar to the one she gave to a maintenance personnel and grabs his arm deducing he is actually Kid in disguise. She then subdues Kid and threatens to hand him over to Ginzo Nakamori. Kid removes the mask in an attempt to pretending to be Shinichi Kudo and convincing Ran by telling her she thought the airship was a UFO once, but she still doesn't trust him and let him go anyway. Meanwhile, the waitress begins to develop a rash on the back of her arms. Jirokichi receives a phone call who tells him the bacteria in the smoking room before hanging up. Nakamori confirms through the ampoule that it is the work of the Red Siamese Cats. Fujioka begins to develop a rash over his whole body and approaches the group whilst in pain before being knocked out by Ran. The waitress with the rash is found unconscious by a short-haired waitress; Fujioka and the unconscious waitress are quarantined in a separate room. Conan leaves to search for The Junior Detective League who are exploring the ship.

Conan finds them in the attic of the airship. There, they witness an unknown culprit unlock the roof allowing the Red Siamese Cats to enter and hijack the ship. Their leader announces they plan to get revenge on Jirokichi who assisted in eradicating the terrorist group and that they will detonate the bombs on the ships or release a second ampoule containing the bacteria if they resist. Conan finds the four bombs in the attic of the ship and disarms them; He notes it was strange they used bombs and bacteria to hijack the ship and attempts to figure out their ulterior motive. The terrorist group holding Jirokichi at gunpoint is able to gain possession of Lady Sky. Mizukawa begins to develop the rash on his right palm and is incarcerated in the smoking room. Ran remembers that Fujioka grabbed her arms and is relieved to find no rash has developed. Nishitani laments that the Detective Boys are missing; the Red Siamese Cats overhear this and bring Conan and the Detective Boys to the lobby. Ai Haibara informs Conan through the Detective Badge that the Red Siamese Cats are after him but is slapped by the short-haired waitress who is revealed to be part of the Red Siamese Cats.

Conan is thrown out the window by their leader and Kid manages to save him. Meanwhile, Heiji Hattori attempts to deduce the Red Siamese Cats goals, and confirming that if their goal is to get revenge on the Jirokichi, they would crash the airship into the Suzuki company building, the Bell Tree Tower and consequently release the bacteria in the airship to the outside world. Conan informs Heiji about the situation. Conan then calls Juzo Megure as Shinichi in order to use a police helicopter which he and Kid use to re-board the airship. Conan finds two of the four re-armed bombs in the attic of the airship and grows suspicious as there is no bomb behind the smoking room which would have released the bacteria. Heiji calls Conan telling him the Red Siamese Cats have posted on the internet about the airship causing mass panic to the cities in the airship's path. As the ship approaches Nara, Kid informs Conan that the ship is emitting smoke. Conan realizes the Red Siamese Cats' true motive and sends Heiji to Nara.

Ran begins to develop a rash from where Fujioka touched her and is quarantined in the smoking room. Conan becomes suspicious of the bacteria as it was only supposed to spread by droplet contact and not physical contact. Conan notices the black fingernails from Ran's escort and realizes what the true nature of the infection is. Conan lures the Red Siamese Cats to the attic of the airship and incapacitates them one by one. Heiji, meanwhile, confronts four policemen at Kōfuku-ji revealing they are part of the Red Siamese Cats and used the airship to evacuate the city in order to steal the priceless buddharupas. The four fake policemen are then arrested by the Nara police. Conan enters the smoking room where Ran is quarantined and reveals that the Red Siamese Cats never released a bacterium. He explains the smoking room was sprayed with an irritating lacquer which causes a rash when it contacts the skin. After entering the room where Fujioka and the unconscious waitress were quarantined, Conan finds the waitress bound and gagged and Fujioka missing. Conan realizes that Fujioka was feigning the symptoms of the bacteria and is the mastermind behind the heist.

The Tokyo Metropolitan Police Department discuss the identities of the Red Siamese Cats. It is revealed they are all foreign mercenaries hired by Fujioka and are only using the terrorist name Red Siamese Cats as a cover up. Conan confronts Fujioka who explains that they targeted the statues since stolen money is easily tracked with modern technology. He then reveals that Nishitani and Ishimoto are his comrades and that the two remaining bombs are placed in the lobby where the group is held and will be detonated when he and his comrades escape the airship. The group in the cabin are tied to the railings by the two culprits who take Lady Sky as their prize. As Fujioka prepares to kill Conan, the airship passes under a bridge and Conan latches his belt to the airship and inflates the soccer ball, jamming it between the bridge and airship causing the airship to tilt vertically. Fujioka falls into the ocean below and the two culprits in the lobby are knocked unconscious. Kid enters the lobby and unties Ran from the railing and leaves with Lady Sky. As he examines the jewel in the moonlight, Ran, believing Kid to be Shinichi, asks him to turn himself in to the police. Kid tells her he will comply if she kisses him.

As the two approach for a kiss in the post credits scene, Ran stops and tells him he is not Shinichi. Conan enters the room and angrily runs towards Kid. Kid places Lady Sky on Ran's finger and leaves through the ceiling. Conan asks what Kid did to her, to which she remarks something Shinichi never does and thinks about how he tried to touch her rear.

== Cast ==
- Minami Takayama as Conan Edogawa
  - Takayama also voices young Shinichi in the flashback.
  - Kappei Yamaguchi as Shinichi Kudo (himself and Kid's disguise)
    - Yamaguchi also voices Kaito Kuroba/Kaito Kid
- Rikiya Koyama as Kogoro Mori
- Wakana Yamazaki as Ran Mori
- Megumi Hayashibara as Ai Haibara
- Kenichi Ogata as Dr. Hiroshi Agasa
- Chafurin as Juzo Megure
- Atsuko Yuya as Miwako Sato
- Yukiko Iwai as Ayumi Yoshida
- Ikue Ohtani as Mitsuhiko Tsuburaya
- Wataru Takagi as Genta Kojima and Wataru Takagi
- Isshin Chiba as Kazunobu Chiba
- Naoko Matsui as Sonoko Suzuki
- Nagai Ichirou as Jirokichi Suzuki
- Unshō Ishizuka as Ginzo Nakamori
- Ryo Horikawa as Heiji Hattori
- Yuko Miyamura as Kazuha Toyama

== Production ==
The film was announced to be in the making at the end of the thirteenth film, The Raven Chaser. The details of the film were announced on the official website on December 9, 2009. On March 26, 2010, a tankōbon volume containing the first chapters of Detective Conan and Magic Kaito was released by Shogakukan. On April 10, 2010, a blimp was flying around Tokyo and Yokohama in order to promote the film. An OVA which dictated the aftermath of the film was released on the same day the film previewed in Japan.

== Music ==
The theme song used for this film is "Over Drive" by Garnet Crow which was released as a single on April 14, 2010. The official soundtrack of the film was released on April 14, 2010.

== Home media ==
The DVD rental version was released on October 8, 2010, and includes the film and a secret game.

Four versions are slated to be released: the regular DVD and Blu-ray version, and the special limited version in DVD and Blu-ray version. All versions are slated to be released on November 16, 2010, and include 5.1 Dolby Digital HD Surround Sound audio. The regular versions contains the film, the trailer, and a postcard drawn by Gosho Aoyama. The special limited versions contain not only the film, the trailer, and the postcard, but also contains "Osaka Okonomiyaki Odyssey" from Magic File #4, the promotional special I Love Conan Gather! How to Enjoy Detective Conan: Lost Ship in the Sky 100 Times More!, photo labels, and a sleeve case.

== Reception ==
The film was one of the nominees for the 2010 Japan Academy Prize for Animation of the Year.
