= Go! My Heaven =

Single by Hayami Kishimoto
- B-side: "Fake Happy End, Shadow or Light?"
- Released: October 18, 2006 (Japan)
- Genre: J-Pop
- Label: Giza Studio (Japan)

Hayami Kishimoto singles chronology
"'Peach:Lime//Shake'" (2006)	"'Go! My Heaven'" (2006)	"'See you Darling'" (2007)

Go! My Heaven is the 10th single from the Japanese singer Hayami Kishimoto, released on October 18, 2006. The single contains the lead track Go! My Heaven, two b-side tracks titled Fake Happy End and Shadow or Light?, and one instrumental for the lead track.

== CD track listing ==
1. Go! My Heaven
2. Fake Happy End
3. Shadow or Light?
4. Go! My Heaven -Instrumental-

== Music video ==
The music video for Go! My Heaven is set in a dimly lit room in which Kishimoto can be seen dancing while changing through a number of outfits. One other scene in the video shows Kishimoto sitting on a couch alone while looking into the camera and singing.
