= I'm Waiting 4 You =

Studio album by Garnet Crow
- Released: December 8, 2004
- Recorded: 2004
- Genre: J-pop
- Length: 56:25
- Label: Giza Studio
- Producer: Garnet Crow; Kanonji

Garnet Crow chronology
Crystallize: Kimi to Iu Hikari (2003)	I'm Waiting 4 You (2004)	Best (2005)

Singles from I'm Waiting 4 You
- 1. "Bokura Dake no Mirai" Released: January 14, 2004; 2. "Kimi wo Kazaru Hana wo Sakasou" Released: June 16, 2004; 3. "Wasurezaki" Released: November 17, 2004

I'm Waiting 4 You is the fourth studio album by Japanese J-pop band Garnet Crow. It was released on December 8, 2004, under Giza Studio label.

== Background ==
The album consist of three previously released singles, such as Bokura Dake no Mirai, Kimi wo Kazaru Hana wo Sakasou and Wasurezaki.

The track Sky, which was previously released in their mini album First Kaleidoscope has received new album mix under title new arranged track. This version of Sky is included in their first compilation album Best.

Ameagari no Blue was performed for the first time in their live tour Garnet Crow Livescope 2004 -Kimi to Iu Hikari- before the official recording release.

== Commercial performance ==
"I'm Waiting 4 You" made its chart debut on the official Oricon Albums Chart at #11 rank for first week with 35,917 sold copies. It charted for 10 weeks and sold 64,347 copies.

== Track listing ==
All tracks are composed by Yuri Nakamura, written by Nana Azuki and arranged by Hirohito Furui.

No.	Title	Length
1.	"Yuzukiyo (夕月夜)"	4:16
2.	"Tsumetai Kage (冷たい影)"	5:23
3.	"Wasurezaki (忘れ咲き)"	4:56
4.	"Kimi wo Kazaru Hana wo Sakasou (君を飾る花を咲かそう)"	4:10
5.	"U"	4:06
6.	"fill away"	4:06
7.	"Bokura Dake no Mirai (僕らだけの未来)"	3:10
8.	"Kono Fuyu no Shirosa ni (この冬の白さに)"	3:51
9.	"Blue no Mori de (ブルーの森で)"	4:06
10.	"Ame Agari no Blue (雨上がりのBlue)"	4:31
11.	"Picture of world"	4:01
12.	"Sky" (new arranged track)	5:15
13.	"Kimi Tsuresaru Toki no Otozure wo (君 連れ去る時の訪れを)"	4:42

== Personnel ==
Credits adapted from the CD booklet of I'm Waiting 4 You.

- Yuri Nakamura - vocals, backing vocals, composing
- Nana Azuki - songwriting, keyboard
- Hirohito Furui - arranging, keyboard
- Hitoshi Okamoto - acoustic guitar, bass
- Miguel Sa' Pessoa - arranging
- Katsuyuki Yoshimatu - recording engineering
- Aki Morimoto - recording engineering
- Akio Nakajima - mixing engineering
- Tomoko Nozaki - mixing engineering
- Masahiro Shimada - mastering engineering
- Gan Kojima - art direction
- Kumiko Nishida - art direction
- Kanonji - executive producer

== Usage in media ==
- Bokura Dake no Mirai: theme song in Fuji TV program Sport!
- Kimi wo Kazaru Hana wo Sakasou: ending theme for Anime television series Monkey Turn
- Wasurezaki: ending theme for Anime television series Detective Conan
