= Locks (album) =

Studio album by Garnet Crow
- Released: March 12, 2008
- Recorded: 2007–2008
- Genre: J-pop
- Length: 50:38
- Label: Giza Studio
- Producer: Garnet Crow; Kanonji

Garnet Crow chronology
The Twilight Valley (2006)	Locks (2008)	Stay: Yoake no Soul (2009)

Singles from Locks
- 1. "Kaze to Rainbow/Kono Te wo Nobaseba" Released: February 21, 2007; 2. "Namida no Yesterday" Released: July 4, 2007; 3. "Sekai wa Mawaru to Iu Keredo" Released: November 14, 2007

Locks is the sixth studio album by Japanese band Garnet Crow. It was released on March 18, 2008, under Giza Studio label.

== Background ==
The album includes three previously released singles, Kaze to Rainbow/Kono Te wo Nobaseba, Namida no Yesterday and Sekai wa Mawaru to Iu Keredo. Two were remixed under the title album ver., with instrumentation 30 seconds longer and more varied in comparison to the original singles.

Locks is the group's first album which was released in three formats: regular edition, limited "A" and "B" CD+DVD edition. Limited "A" includes DVD disc with the short footage of their live Garnet Crow Special Live in Ninnanji and limited "B" includes DVD disc with three music videoclips.

== Commercial performance ==
"Locks" made its chart debut on the official Oricon Albums Chart at #5 rank for first week with 31,555 sold copies. It charted for 6 weeks and sold more than 45,000 copies.

== Track listing ==
All tracks are composed by Yuri Nakamura, written by Nana Azuki and arranged by Hirohito Furui.

No.	Title	Length
1.	"Saigo no Ritou 最後の離島"	3:44
2.	"Namida no Yesterday 涙のイエスタデー" (album ver.)	5:05
3.	"Sekai wa Mawaru to Iu Keredo 世界はまわると言うけれど"	4:42
4.	"Mou Ichido Waratte もう一度 笑って"	5:11
5.	"Kono Te wo Nobaseba この手を伸ばせば" (album ver.)	5:02
6.	"doubt"	4:09
7.	"Kaze to Rainbow 風とRAINBOW"	3:36
8.	"Futari ふたり"	5:16
9.	"Mr.Holiday"	3:50
10.	"The first cry"	5:45
11.	"Love is a Bird"	4:25

== Use in other media ==
1. Namida no Yesterday was used as opening theme for Anime television series Detective Conan
2. Sekai wa Mawaru to Iu Keredo was used as ending theme for anime Detective Conan
3. Mou Ichido Waratte was used as ending theme for TBS program Deji@Kan
4. Kaze to Rainbow was used as opening theme for Anime television series MÄR
5. Kono Te wo Nobaseba was used as ending theme for Anime television series MÄR
