= Stay: Yoake no Soul =

Studio album by Garnet Crow
- Released: September 30, 2009
- Recorded: 2008–2009
- Genre: J-pop
- Length: 56:33
- Label: Giza Studio
- Producer: Garnet Crow; Kanonji

Garnet Crow chronology
Locks (2008)	Stay: Yoake no Soul (2009)	Parallel Universe (2010)

Singles from Stay: Yoake no Soul
- 1. "Yume no Hitotsu" Released: August 13, 2008; 2. "Hyakunen no Kodoku" Released: October 22, 2008; 3. "Doing All Right/Nora" Released: May 20, 2009; 4. "Hana wa Saite Tada Yurete" Released: August 19, 2009

Stay: Yoake no Soul is the seventh studio album by Japanese group Garnet Crow. The album was released on September 30, 2009, by Giza Studio. The lead single, "Yume no Hitotsu", was released on August 13, 2008.

== Commercial performance ==
"Stay: Yoake no Soul" made its chart debut on the official Oricon Albums Chart at #7rank for first week with 22,802 sold copies. It charted for 6 weeks and sold 31,092 copies.

== Track listing ==
All tracks are composed by Yuri Nakamura, written by Nana Azuki and arranged by Hirohito Furui.

No.	Title	Length
1.	"Hello Sadness"	5:11
2.	"Hyakunen no Kodoku (百年の孤独)"	4:49
3.	"Hana wa Saite Tada Yurete (花は咲いて ただ揺れて) album ver."	4:15
4.	"Elysium"	4:43
5.	"Doing All Right"	5:04
6.	"On the way"	3:55
7.	"Stay"	4:45
8.	"Hibi no Hotori (日々のほとり)"	4:55
9.	"Yume no Hitotsu (夢のひとつ)"	4:57
10.	"Fall in Life ~Hallelujah~"	4:53
11.	"Rainy Soul"	4:05
12.	"Koi no Aima ni (恋のあいまに)"	5:02

== Use in other media ==
- Hyaku Nen no Kodoku was used as theme song in anime movie Fist of the North Star: The Legends of the True Savior
- Hana wa Saite Tada Yurete was used as ending for TBS program Uwasa no! Tokyo Magazine
- Doing all right was used as outro song for anime Detective Conan
- On My Way was used as ending song for Fuji TV program Hokkaido Marathon 2009
- Yume Hitotsu was used as the ending song for anime Golgo 13
