= Memories (Garnet Crow album) =

Studio album by Garnet Crow
- Released: December 7, 2011
- Recorded: 2011
- Genre: J-pop
- Length: 47:28
- Label: Giza Studio
- Producer: Garnet Crow

Garnet Crow chronology
parallel universe (2010)	Memories (2011)	Terminus (2013)

Singles from Memories
- 1. "Smiley Nation" Released: June 29, 2011; 2. "Misty Mystery" Released: August 31, 2011

Memories is the ninth studio album by Japanese group Garnet Crow. The album was released on December 7, 2011, by Giza Studio.

== Background ==
The album consist of two previously released singles, Smiley Nation and Misty Mystery.

B-side track Live from single Misty Mystery get new album arrangement under subtitle When You Are Near!.

This is their last album where a theme song from Anime television series Detective Conan was included.

== Commercial performance ==
The album reached #11 rank in Oricon for first week. It charted for 7 weeks and sold 13,798 copies.

== Track listing ==
All tracks are composed by Yuri Nakamura, written by Nana Azuki and arranged by Hirohito Furui.

No.	Title	Length
1.	"Smiley Nation"	4:12
2.	"live ~When You Are Near!~"	5:00
3.	"Judy"	4:12
4.	"Misty Mystery"	4:22
5.	"Issho ni Kurasou (一緒に暮らそう)"	4:27
6.	"Memories (メモリーズ)"	4:06
7.	"Shijima no Concerto (静寂のconcerto)"	4:09
8.	"Souseki I (創世記I)"	3:54
9.	"Lonely Night (ロンリーナイト)"	3:44
10.	"Eiyuu (英雄)"	5:14
11.	"Blue Regret"	4:15

== Use in other media ==
- Smiley Nation was used as ending theme in Nippon TV program Futtonda
- Misty Mystery was used as opening theme for anime Detective Conan
- Live 〜When You Are Near!〜 was used as theme song in TV Asahi program Go tou chiken Emi TV Sore tte Kininaruu~
