= First Soundscope: Mizu no Nai Hareta Umi e =

Studio album by Garnet Crow
- Released: January 31, 2001
- Recorded: 1999–2000
- Genre: J-pop
- Length: 57:06
- Label: Giza Studio
- Producer: Kanonji

Garnet Crow chronology
First Kaleidscope: Kimi no Uchi ni Tsuku made Zutto Hashitte Yuku (1999)	First Soundscope: Mizu no Nai Hareta Umi e (2001)	Sparkle: Sujigakidōri no Sky Blue (2002)

Singles from First Soundscope: Mizu no Nai Hareta Umi e
- 1. "Mysterious Eyes" Released: March 29, 2000; 2. "Kimi no Uchi ni Tsuku made Zutto Hashitte Yuku" Released: March 29, 2000; 3. "Futari no Rocket" Released: May 17, 2000; 4. "Sen Ijō no Kotoba wo Narabete mo..." Released: September 27, 2000; 5. "Natsu no Maboroshi" Released: October 25, 2000; 6. "flying" Released: November 29, 2000

First Soundscope: Mizu no Nai Hareta Umi e (first soundscope 〜水のない晴れた海へ〜) is the debut studio album by Japanese band Garnet Crow. It was released on January 31, 2001 under Giza Studio.

== Background ==
The album consists of six previously released singles.

Two out of thirteen tracks, Kimi no Uchi ni Tsuku made Zutto Hashitte Yuku and Futari no Rocket were previously released in their indies album First Kaleidscope: Kimi no Uchi ni Tsuku made Zutto Hashitte Yuku with the small instrumental and arrangement change.

Rhythm was supposed to release as fourth single, however due to unknown reason the release was canceled and was replaced with the release of single Sen Ijō no Kotoba wo Narabete mo.

Natsu no Maboroshi received album mix under title secret arrange.

A leading album track Mizu no Nai Hareta Umi e was released in Giza Studio's compilation album Giza Studio Masterpiece Blend 2001.

This album was released on the same day as Nana Azuki's first poetry book 80,0.

== Commercial performance ==
"First Soundscope: Mizu no Nai Hareta Umi e" made its chart debut on the official Oricon Albums Chart at #6 rank for first week with 51,830 sold copies. It charted for 5 weeks and totally sold 87,150 copies.

== Track listing ==
All tracks are composed by Yuri Nakamura, written by Nana Azuki, arranged by Hirohito Furui (expect #1 and #2, by Miguel Sá Pessoa).

No.	Title	Length
1.	"Mizu no Nai Hareta Umi e (水のない晴れた海へ)"	4:38
2.	"Kimi no Uchi ni Tsuku made Zutto Hashitte Yuku (君の家に着くまでずっと走ってゆく)"	4:01
3.	"Natsu no Maboroshi (夏の幻)"	3.55
4.	"Futari no Rocket (二人のロケット)"	4:45
5.	"Meguri Kuru Haru ni (巡り来る春に)"	4:57
6.	"HAPPY DAYS?"	3:55
7.	"Mysterious Eyes"	4:29
8.	"Rhythm"	4:23
9.	"Holding you, and swinging"	4:42
10.	"flying"	4:29
11.	"Sen Ijou no Kotoba wo Narabete mo... (千以上の言葉を並べても…)"	4:13
12.	"wonder land"	4:36
13.	"Natsu no Maboroshi (夏の幻)" (secret arrange ver.)	4:10

== Personnel ==
Credits adapted from the CD booklet of First Soundscope: Mizu no Nai Hareta Umi he.

- Yuri Nakamura - vocals, composing
- Nana Azuki - songwriting, keyboard
- Hirohito Furui - arranging, keyboard
- Hitoshi Okamoto - acoustic guitar, bass
- Miguel Sá Pessoa - keyboards, recording, mixing
- Michael Africk - backing vocals
- Aaron Hsu-Flanders - acoustic guitar
- John Clark - electric guitar
- Ryu Yokoji - saxophone
- Yoshinobu Ohga (nothin' but love) - acoustic guitar, electric guitar
- Hiroshi Tokunaga - bass
- Toshikazu Kamei - drums
- Akio Nakajima - recording, mixing
- Takayuki Ichikawa - recording, mixing
- Katsuyuki Yoshimatsu - assistant engineer
- Masahiro Shimada - mastering
- Gan Kojima – art direction
- Kanonji - producing

== Use in media ==
- Mysterious Eyes - opening theme for Anime television series Detective Conan
- Futari no Rocket - campaign theme song for MFTV
- Sen Ijō no Kotoba wo Narabete mo - commercial song for Dome
- Natsu no Maboroshi - ending theme for Anime television series Detective Conan
- flying - opening theme for PlayStation game Tales of Eternia
