= Crystallize: Kimi to Iu Hikari =

Studio album by Garnet Crow
- Released: November 12, 2003
- Recorded: 2002–2003
- Genre: J-pop
- Length: 53:00
- Label: Giza Studio
- Producers: Garnet Crow; Kanonji

Garnet Crow chronology
Sparkle: Sujigakidōri no Sky Blue (2002)	Crystallize: Kimi to Iu Hikari (2003)	I'm Waiting 4 You (2004)

Singles from Crystallize: Kimi to Iu Hikari
- 1. "Spiral" Released: August 14, 2002; 2. "Crystal Gauge" Released: December 11, 2002; 3. "Nakenai Yoru mo Nakanai Asa mo" Released: July 23, 2003; 4. "Kimi to Iu Hikari" Released: September 10, 2003

Crystallize: Kimi to Iu Hikari (Crystallize 〜君という光〜) is the third studio album by Japanese band Garnet Crow. It was released on November 12, 2003 under Giza Studio.

== Background ==
The album consists of the four previously released singles.

The single Yume Mita Ato de received new mixed version under title lightin' grooves True meaning of love mix. The track was arranged by Daisuke Ikeda.

Spiral was released in Giza Studio's compilation album Giza Studio Masterpiece Blend 2002. Eien wo Kakenukeru Isshun no Bokura and Nakenai Yoru mo Nakanai Asa mo in the compilation album Giza Studio Masterpiece Blend 2003.

In 2010, Koisuru Koto Shika Dekinai Mitai ni received in their conceptual album All Lovers with completely new recording and mix under the title Koi no Tsubomi (恋の蕾).

== Commercial performance ==
"Crystallize: Kimi to Iu Hikari" made its chart debut on the official Oricon Albums Chart at #5 rank for first week with 45,163 sold copies. It charted for 13 weeks and sold 84,071 copies.

== Track listing ==
All tracks are composed by Yuri Nakamura, written by Nana Azuki and arranged by Hirohito Furui.

No.	Title	Length
1.	"Kyou no Kimi wo Asu wo Motsu (今日の君と明日を待つ)"	5:10
2.	"Kimi to Iu Hikari (君という光)"	5:09
3.	"Spiral (スパイラル)"	4:08
4.	"Nakenai Yoru mo Nakanai Asa mo (泣けない夜も 泣かない朝も)"	4:10
5.	"Crystal Gauge (クリスタル・ゲージ)"	3:24
6.	"Marionette Fantasia"	4:53
7.	"Eien wo Kakenukeru Isshun no Bokura (永遠を駆け抜ける一瞬の僕ら)"	4:15
8.	"Endless Desire"	4:40
9.	"Nogare no Machi (逃れの町)"	3:10
10.	"Only Stay"	4:36
11.	"Koisuru Koto Shika Dekinai Mitai ni (恋することしか出来ないみたいに)"	4:36
12.	"Yume Mita Ato de (夢みたあとで)" (lightin' grooves True meaning of love mix)	4:55

== Personnel ==
Credits adapted from the CD booklet of Crystallize: Kimi to Iu Hikari.

- Yuri Nakamura - vocals, composing
- Nana Azuki - songwriting, keyboard
- Hirohito Furui - arranging, keyboard
- Hitoshi Okamoto - acoustic guitar, bass
- Yoshinobu Ohga (ex. nothin' but love) -guitar
- Fernando Huergo - bass
- Jeff Lockheart - electronic guitar
- Miguel Sa' Pessoa - piano, sound producing, arranging
- Daisuke Ikeda - arranging
- Yoshinori Akai - recording engineer
- Katsuyuki Yoshimatsu - recording engineer
- Tatsuya Okada - recording engineer
- Aki Morimoto - recording engineer
- Katsuo Urano - recording engineer
- Makoto Fudoh - recording engineer
- Akio Nakajima - mixing engineer
- Takayuki Ichikawa - mixing engineer
- Tomoko Nozaki - mixing engineer
- Shin Takakuwa - mixing engineer
- Masahiro Shimada - mastering engineer
- Be Planning - art direction
- Kanonji - producing

== Use in media ==
- Spiral - theme song in Fuji TV program Sport!
- Crystal Gauge - ending theme in TBS program Pooh!
- Nakenai Yoru mo Nakanai Asa mo - ending theme for Fuji TV program Uchimura Produce
- Kimi to Iu Hikari - ending theme for Anime television series Detective Conan
- Eien wo Kakenukeru Isshun no Bokura - ending theme for Tokyo Broadcasting System Television program Sunday Japan
