= Sparkle: Sujigakidōri no Sky Blue =

Studio album by Garnet Crow
- Released: April 24, 2002
- Recorded: 2001–2002
- Genre: J-pop
- Length: 51:48
- Label: Giza Studio
- Producer: Garnet Crow; Kanonji

Garnet Crow chronology
First Soundscope: Mizu no Nai Hareta Umi e (2001)	Sparkle: Sujigakidōri no Sky Blue (2002)	Crystallize: Kimi to Iu Hikari (2003)

Singles from Sparkle: Sujigakidōri no Sky Blue
- 1. "Last Love Song" Released: May 9, 2001; 2. "call my name" Released: August 8, 2001; 3. "Timeless Sleep" Released: November 21, 2001; 4. "Yume Mita Ato de" Released: March 13, 2002

Sparkle: Sujigakidōri no Sky Blue (SPARKLE～筋書き通りのスカイブルー～) is the second studio album by Japanese group Garnet Crow. It was released on April 24, 2002, under Giza Studio.

== Background ==
The album contains four previously released singles.

Two out of twelve tracks, Mysterious eyes and Timeless Sleep received in this album new album mixes under title dry flavor of "G" mix, which has more techno sound and Flow-ing surround mix which is slower and less rock than original. Both of the bonus tracks were arranged by Miguel Sá Pessoa.

The singles call my name was released in Giza Studio compilation album Giza Studio Masterpiece Blend 2001, and Yume Mita Atode was released in another compilation album Giza Studio Masterpiece Blend 2002.

== Commercial performance ==
"Sparkle: Sujigakidōri no Sky Blue" made its chart debut on the official Oricon Albums Chart at #4 rank for first week with 73,010 sold copies. It charted for 9 weeks and sold 156,410 copies.

== Track listing ==
All tracks are composed by Yuri Nakamura, written by Nana Azuki and arranged by Hirohito Furui.

No.	Title	Length
1.	"Yume Mita Ato de (夢みたあとで)"	4:58
2.	"call my name"	4:51
3.	"Timeless Sleep"	4:37
4.	"pray"	4:29
5.	"Naked Story"	3:51
6.	"Last love song"	3:24
7.	"Sky Blue (スカイ・ブルー)"	3:32
8.	"wish★"	4:18
9.	"Please, forgive me"	4:20
10.	"Holy ground"	4:40

=== Bonus tracks ===
No.	Title	Length
1.	"Mysterious Eyes" (dry flavor of "G" mix)	4:46
2.	"Timeless Sleep" (flow-ing surround mix)	4:07

== Personnel ==
Credits adapted from the CD booklet of Sparkle: Sujigakidōri no Sky Blue.

- Yuri Nakamura - vocals, composing
- Nana Azuki - songwriting, keyboard
- Hirohito Furui - arranging, keyboard
- Hitoshi Okamoto - guitar, backing chorus
- Miguel Sá Pessoa - keyboards, recording, mixing, arranging, sound producer
- Yoshinobu Ohga (nothin' but love) - guitar
- Aaron-Hsu-Flanders - acoustic guitar
- John Clark - electric guitar
- Yoshinori Akari - recording engineer
- Katsuyuki Yoshimatsu - recording engineer
- Tatsuya Okada - recording engineer
- Aki Morimoto - recording engineer
- Akio Nakajima - mixing engineer
- Takayuki Ichikawa - mixing engineer
- Toshiyui Ebihara: A&R
- Gan Kojima – art direction
- Kanonji - producing

== Use in other media ==
- Last Love Song - ending theme for TV Asahi program Beat Takeshi's TV Tackle
- Call my name - ending theme for Anime television series Project ARMS
- Timeless sleep - ending theme for Anime television series Project ARMS
- Yume Mita Ato de - ending theme for Anime television series Detective Conan
- Naked Story - opening theme for Anime television series Secret of Cerulean Sand
- Sky Blue - ending theme for Tokyo Broadcasting System Television program Sunday Japan
- Holy Ground - ending theme for Nihon TV program Bakushou Mondai no Susume
