= Terminus (album) =

Studio album by Garnet Crow
- Released: March 20, 2013
- Recorded: 2012–2013
- Genre: J-pop
- Length: 43:35
- Label: Giza Studio
- Producer: Garnet Crow

Garnet Crow chronology
Memories (2011)	Terminus (2013)

Singles from Terminus
- 1. "Nostalgia" Released: September 26, 2012

Terminus is the tenth and the final studio album by Japanese band Garnet Crow. It album was released on March 20, 2013, by Giza Studio. The album consist of one previously released single, "Nostalgia".

== Commercial performance ==
The album reached #9 rank in Oricon for first week with 11,043 sold copies. It charted for 6 weeks and sold 13,884 copies.

== Track listing ==
All tracks are composed by Yuri Nakamura, written by Nana Azuki and arranged by Hirohito Furui.

No.	Title	Length
1.	"Nostalgia"	4:28
2.	"trade"	4:41
3.	"Maizy"	5:28
4.	"Shiroi Sora (白い空)"	4:00
5.	"Life goes on!"	3:49
6.	"P.S.GIRL"	3:27
7.	"Umi o yuku shishi (海をゆく獅子)"	4:28
8.	"Kagami ni mita yume (鏡にみた夢)"	4:53
9.	"The Someone's Tale"	4:01
10.	"closer"	4:25

== Use in other media ==
- "Nostalgia" was used as the ending theme for the program Happy Music
