= Hayami Kishimoto =

Japanese singer

Hayami Kishimoto 岸本 早未
- Also known as: はやみん (Hayamin)
- Born: Miwako Kishimoto 岸本美和子; June 25, 1987 (age 39)
- Origin: Kyoto, Japan
- Genres: J-Pop, R&B
- Occupation: Singer
- Instrument: Singing
- Years active: 2003–2008
- Label: Giza Studio
- Website: Official Site

Miwako Kishimoto

YouTube information
- Channel: 喋らせてもろてます。【下着屋さん】
- Years active: 2020-2025
- Subscribers: 1.55 thousand
- Views: 91,185
- Last updated: July 31st, 2026

Hayami Kishimoto (岸本早未, Kishimoto Hayami; born June 25, 1987 in Kyoto, Japan) is a retired female Japanese popular music singer. She was affiliated with the Giza Studio recording label for her four-year career.

== Biography ==
Hayami Kishimoto in October 2002 tried out for "Dig Star" audition by GIZA Studio, and won the grand champion with her singing and dancing.

On her birthday on June 25, 2003, GIZA Studio published Kishimoto's first single CD, MeiQ!?-Meikyū-MAKE YOU- (迷Q!?-迷宮-MAKE YOU-) that appeared on Oricon single chart in the first week as no.15 and a smash hit. She released 11 single CDs, one mini album, two full album. As a dancer with bold and sharp style, and as a lyricist she spelled out her personal view of love and friendship as a young woman. As a fashion icon who designed jackets, costumes and nail art she put on for her performance, became popular amongst girls of her age, and many fashion magazines made her appear on their pages.

== Discography ==
=== Albums ===
==== Studio albums ====
Title	Album details	Peak chart positions	Sales
Title	Album details	JPN	Sales
Meikyū (迷宮, Maze)	Released: September 10, 2003; Label: Giza Studio; Formats: CD, CD+DVD, digital download	16	20,413
Juicy	Released: November 24, 2004; Label: Giza Studio; Formats: CD, CD+DVD, digital download	35	9,426

=== Extended plays ===
Title	Album details	Peak chart positions	Sales
Title	Album details	JPN	Sales
Love Drops	Released: September 20, 2006; Label: Giza Studio; Formats: CD, digital download	47	3,797

=== Singles ===
==== As lead artist ====
Title	Year	Peak chart positions	Sales (JPN)	Album
Title	Year	JPN	Sales (JPN)	Album
"MeiQ!?-Meikyū-Make You- (迷Q!?-迷宮-MAKE YOU-)"	2003	15	21,000	Meikyū
"Aisuru Kimi ga Soba ni Ireba (愛する君が傍にいれば)"	2003	37	8,230	Meikyū
"Mienai Story (みえないストーリー)"	2003	59	4,617	Juicy
"Kaze ni Mukai Aruku you ni (風に向かい歩くように)"	2004	50	3,945	Juicy
"Suteki na Yume Miyou ne (素敵な夢みようね)"	2004	47	3,572	Juicy
"Dessert Days"	2004	36	4,368	Juicy
"Yume Real (ユメリアル)"	2004	49	4,008	Juicy
"Jump!ing Go Let's Go"	2005	47	2,999	Love Drops
"Peach:Lime//Shake"	2006	64	2,105	Love Drops
"Go! My Heaven"	2006	50	2,108	Non-album singles
"See You Darling"	2007	84	1,456	Non-album singles

=== Compilation albums ===
1. GIZA Studio Masterpiece Blend 2003 (GIZA studio マスターピース ブレンド 2003) (December 2003) by GIZA Records, two CDs, No.7 迷Q!?-迷宮-MAKE・YOU. GZCA-5044, GZCA-5045.
2. Fun’s recommend (ファンズレコメンド ミュージック・アンド・ヴィジュアル・セレクション) (September 2004) by avex trax, one CD and one visual DVD. No.13 Aisuru Kimi ga Soba ni Ireba (愛する君が傍にいれば) AVCD-17523, AVCD-17523B.
3. It’s TV Show! TBS and Fuji Televisions Theme Songs, Opening Songs, Penultimate Songs ! (～TBSテレビ&フジテレビ主題歌&テーマ曲 MU-HA presents, best～disc 2.) (October 2004) by B-Gram RECORDS, one CD. No.5 MeiQ!?-Meikyū-MAKE YOU- (迷Q!?-迷宮-MAKE YOU-) JBCJ-9010.
4. Rina matsuri 2004 (里菜・祭り2004) (November 2004) by B-VISION, two visual DVDs. No.4 Please Mr.Postman (chorus with Rina Aiuchi); no.5 Suteki na Yume Miyou ne (素敵な夢みようね) ONBD-7037, ONBD-7038.
