= Shiori Takei =

Shiori Takei 竹井 詩織里
- Born: February 6, 1985 (age 41); Osaka, Japan
- Genres: J-pop
- Occupations: singer; songwriter; radio personality
- Years active: 2003-2008
- Labels: Tent House (2003-2006); Giza Studio (2004-2008)
- Website: shiori-takei.com

Shiori Takei (竹井 詩織里, Takei Shiori) is a former Japanese pop singer and songwriter from Nishinomiya, Hyogo. She was signed to Giza Studio and Tent House after she came in second place on fifth season of Super Starlight Contest, the audition hosted by Being. Her debut extended play The Note of My Eighteen Years was released in 2003, and her debut studio album My Favorite Things was released on September 5, 2004. In August 2005, Takei released the single "Sekai Tomete", which served as the ending theme song for the Japanese animated television series, Case Closed. The song reached number 27 in Japan and became her best-selling single in her career.

In February 2008, Takei released her first compilation album Shiori Takei Best to a moderate commercial success, reaching number 69 in Japan. She reportedly retired from the music industry in 2009 and her name was removed from the artist list of her former label.

== Biography ==
After graduating from high school, she began her music activities, such as performing in live concerts, in the Kansai area. Through her work in the independent music scene, she released a cover album with the support of the members of the fusion band Dimension.

In 2003, she participated in cover album "The Hit Parade" where Tak Matsumoto from B'z was executive producer.

In February 2004, she made her major debut with the single "Shizukanaru Melody". In 2005, she released her 5th single Sekai Tomete which was used as ending theme for TV anime series Detective Conan. With more than 13,000 copies sold, this single became the biggest hit of her whole career.

In 2006, she began to broadcast her own radio program "Takei Shiori no Onsen Biyori" (竹井詩織里の音泉日和). The regular broadcast ended in 2008.

Takei sang backing vocals for many other artists such as Zard, Aya Kamiki and B'z. In 2007, she made appearance as guest in Dimension's event "Takashi Masuzaki presents “The Lounge Vol.10".

After releasing her best album "Shiori Takei Best" in 2008, she retired from singing.

== Discography ==
Takei recorded 9 singles, 3 cover albums, 1 mini album, 3 studio albums and 1 best album.

=== Singles ===
No.	Name	Release date	Rank
1st	Shizukanaru Melody (静かなるメロディー)	18 February 2004	88
2nd	Kimi ni Koishiteru (君に恋してる)	19 May 2004	90
3rd	Kimi wo Shiranai Machi he (君を知らない街へ)	19 January 2005	70
4th	Tsunagari (つながり)	6 July 2005	99
5th	Sekai Tomete (世界 止めて)	10 August 2005	27
6th	Sakurairo (桜色)	1 February 2006	56
7th	Kitto mou Koi ni wa Naranai (きっともう恋にはならない)	30 August 2006	88
8th	Like a little Love	8 November 2006	59
9th	Yume no Tsuzuki (夢のつづき)	28 February 2007	94

=== Albums ===
No.	Name	Release date	Rank
1st	My Favorite Things	15 September 2004	78
2nd	Second tune ~Sekai Tomete~ (～世界 止めて～)	28 September 2005	49
3rd	Diary	18 April 2007	48

=== Extended plays ===
No.	Name	Release date	Rank
1st	Documentary	12 September 2007	90

=== Cover albums ===
No.	Name	Release date	Rank
1st	The note of my eighteen years	3 December 2003	-
2nd	The note of my nineteen years	19 January 2005	213
3rd	The note of my twenty years	1 February 2006	169

=== Compilation albums ===
No.	Name	Release date	Rank
1st	Shiori Takei Best (竹井詩織里 ベスト)	6 February 2008	69
