= Nana Azuki =

Nana Azuki AZUKI七
- Born: 26 July 1974 (age 51); Japan
- Genres: Japanese pop, Rock
- Occupations: lyricist, keyboardist, photographer, author
- Years active: 1999–2014, 2023-
- Label: Giza Studio
- Formerly of: Garnet Crow
- Website: http://garnetcrow.com/

Nana Azuki (AZUKI七, Azuki Nana) (born July 26, 1974) is a Japanese musical lyricist and keyboardist under Giza Studio label. She is a former member of the Japanese pop band Garnet Crow, primarily as the lead songwriter and keyboardist.

== Biography ==
Since she was 4, and until she was 19, she took flute and piano lessons. After graduating from college in 1999, she began showing off her talents in a number of auditions. Her earlier works were associated with Maki Ohguro, Deen, Field of View, WAG and Wands.

After creating the band Garnet Crow in 1999 as an indie band and in 2000 as a major band, she has been continuing providing work to a number of Giza Studio artists as Takaoka Ai, Shiori Takei, Hayami Kishimoto and Sayuri Iwata. She has also worked has to Hitoshi Okamoto on his solo work as lyricist.

After Garnet Crow disbanded, she composed one song for the Japanese singer Meg in 2014. From 2015 until 2022, her whereabouts were unknown, however in 2023 Azuki's name appeared in credits as lyricist of the song "...and Rescue me" performed by singer Rainy which serves as an ending theme for anime series Detective Conan.

== List of provided lyrics ==
=== Field of View ===
- Crash (Nana's debut song as lyricist)
- Aoi Kasa de (青い傘で)

=== Deen ===
- Tooi Tooi Mirai he (遠い遠い未来へ)

=== Wag ===
- Free Magic
- Kanashimi no Ame (悲しみの雨)

=== Wands ===
- Kyou, Nanika no Hazumi de Ikiteiru (「今日、ナニカノハズミデ生きている」)

=== Maki Ohguro ===
- Taiyou no Kuni he Ikouyo Suguni (太陽の国へ行こうよ すぐに)

=== Azumi Uehara ===
- Aoi Aoi Kono Chikyuu ni (青い青いこの地球に)
- Special Holynight

=== Superlight ===
- First fine ride
- Res-no
- Sweet×2 Summer Rain
- Happy Trash
- Autumn Sky
- Lost Child
- It's only one
- Sphere
- Stray Beast

=== Hayami Kishimoto ===
- Open Your Heart
- Mei Q ~Meikyuu~-Make you-
- Aisuru Kimi ga Soba ni Ireba (愛する君が傍にいれば)
- Soda Pop
- Never Change
- Kamawanaide (カマワナイデ)
- Reigning star
- It's so easy
- Mienai Story (みえないストーリー)
- Onaji Sekai de (同じ世界で)
- Sutekina Yume wo Miyoune (素敵な夢みようね)
- Aitakute (会いたくて)

=== Soul Crusaders ===
- Safety Love
- Lonesome Tonight ~Kimi Dake Mitsumeteru~ (Lonesome Tonight 〜君だけ見つめてる〜)
- Resolution, Holiday, Free my mind, Do you feel like i like (Flavor of Life)

=== Ai Takaoka ===
- Summer Flooding
- Never to return
- To Beat The Blues
- Natsu no aru Hi ni (夏のある日に)

=== Shiori Takei ===
- Shizukanaru Melody (静かなるメロディ)
- Kimi ni Koishiteru (君に恋してる)
- Sakurairo (桜色)
- Close Line, Yuunagi (夕凪) (My Favorite Things)
- Kitto mou Koi ni wa Naranai (きっともう恋にはならない)
- Like a little Love

=== Sayuri Iwata ===
- Aozora no Neko (空色の猫)

=== MEG ===
- Clair de lune

=== Rainy ===
- ...and Rescue me

== Essay ==
- 80,0 Azuki Nana Photography and Anthology (ISBN 4-916019-25-3 C0095)

== See also ==
- Garnet Crow discography
- Hitoshi Okamoto discography
- Nana Azuki at Anime News Network's encyclopedia
