= Hiroshi Asai =

Japanese musical artist

Hiroshi Asai 麻井 寛史
- Born: 26 April 1978 (age 48); Okayama, Japan
- Genres: Japanese pop
- Occupations: composer, arranger, musician
- Years active: 1999–present
- Label: Giza Studio
- Formerly of: The★tambourines
- Website: http://sensation-music.jp/biography.html

Hiroshi Asai (麻井 寛史, Asai Hiroshi) (born 26 April 1978) is a Japanese arranger, musician and composer for the Giza Studio label. He is a former member of band The★tambourines. Since 2012 he is a member of the instrumental band Sensation. He arranged music for artists such as Miho Komatsu, U-ka Saegusa in dB, Mai Kuraki, Shiori Takei and many others from the Giza Studio label. He did back vocals for Rina Aiuchi. He participated in live concerts for artist such as Zard's since 1999, Koshi Inaba's solo live tours, Marie Ueda and Garnet Crow Symphonic Concert 2010 ~All Lovers~. He is active as an arranger and player as of 2020.

== List of provided works as a composer ==
=== Akane Sugazaki ===
- Promises

== List of provided works as a lyricist ==
=== Aya Kamiki ===
- Sakura E

=== Hayami Kishimoto ===
- Yes or No?
- from you from me

== List of provided works as an arranger ==
=== Miho Komatsu ===
- Camouflage
- Kamisama wa Jitto Miteru

=== U-ka Saegusa in dB ===
- Smile & Tears
- Ryuusei no Nostalgia

=== Ai Takaoka ===
- Nemurenai Yoru

=== Marie Ueda ===
- Hanamonage
- Shihaisha
- Tomoshibi
- Journey
- Romantika

=== Shiori Takei ===
- Yasashii Hizashi
- Ano Umi ga Mietara
- Futari no Sunny Day
- Ryuusei
- At Eighteen
- Shiosai Letter

=== Saasa ===
- Saite Hiraite
- Uso,
- eyes to eyes
- Over The Rainbow
- Naturally

=== Mai Kuraki ===
- Love, Needing
- Chance for you

=== Aiko Kitahara ===
- Kinsenka

=== Aya Kamiki ===
- Crash

=== grram ===
- Atarashii Asa wa Kuru
- Orange Sora

=== Sard Underground ===
- Christmas Time
- You and me (and...)
