= The★tambourines =

Former Japanese pop band

- Origin: Japan
- Genres: J-pop, pop rock
- Years active: 2001–2009
- Label: Giza Studio
- Past members: Ami Matsunaga; Hiroshi Asai; Toshikazu Kamei; Tatsuya Okada
- Website: Official website

the★tambourines were a Japanese pop band signed to the Giza Studio label, active between 2001 and 2009.

== Members ==
- Ami Matsunaga (松永安未) – vocalist, lyricist
- Hiroshi Asai (麻井寛史) – bassist, composer, arranger
- Toshikazu Kamei (亀井俊和) – drummer
- Tatsuya Okada (岡田達也) – engineer

== History ==
=== 2001-2003 ===
In January 2001, the band has formed

In April 2001, they released first single Easy game. The single was included in the Giza Studio's compilation album Giza Studio Masterpiece Blend 2001.

In July 2001, they released second single Hijack brandnew days

In October 2001, they released third single Mayonaka ni Kizuita funny love

In December 2001, vocalist Ami participated in cover album Giza Studio R&B Respect Vol.1: Six Sisters Selection covering "You Can't Hurry Love" by The Supremes. On 15 December, Ami performed cover song in live house Hills Pan Kōjō. DVD footage was released in February 2002.

In February 2002, Mami with Toshikazu started broadcast their own music variety program "AMMY ROAD" on Music 727 Channel.

In March 2002, they've release fourth single Stay Young. In the media it was promoted as an ending theme for Tokyo Broadcasting System Television television program Oujisama no Branch. The single was included in the Giza Studio's compilation album Giza Studio Masterpiece Blend 2002.

In April 2002, they've released first studio album My Back Pages. Album track My back pages was in media promoted as a theme song for YTV television program Asa Ichi!. The album ranked #86 in Oricon Weekly charts and sold 2,750 copies. It was their only album which entered into Top 100 Oricon rankings.

In June 2002, Ami participated in second cover album "GIZA studio MAI-K & FRIENDS HOTROD BEACH PARTY" covering Fun Fun Fun by The Beach Boys. In July, Ami performed this cover song twice in Giza Studio Hotrod Beach Party event in Awaji Yumebutai and Zushi Marina. On November the DVD footage was released.

In July 2002, after one and half year of debut, their fifth single "Wonder Boy" has ranked first week #99 rank in Oricon rankings. In media it was promoted as an ending theme for Yomiuri TV television program BAN!BOO!Pain!!. The single was included in the Giza Studio's compilation album Giza Studio Masterpiece Blend 2002.

In December 2002, they've released sixth single Atsui Namida. Atsui Namida received special mix in their upcoming studio album under subtitle album mix.

In March 2003, they've released seventh single Afresh Wish. In the media it was promoted as ending theme for Tokyo Broadcasting System Television television program Sanma no Super Karakuri TV. The single was included in the Giza Studio's compilation album Giza Studio Masterpiece Blend 2003.

In April 2003, they've released second studio album Dizzy Season. The album reached #115 on the Oricon charts in its first week. It charted for 2 week and sold more than 3,000 copies.

In July 2003, Ami appeared as a guest in Wag live performance at live house Hills Pan Koujou GIZA studio presents THURSDAY LIVE "ROCK NIGHT".

In August 2003, they've released eighth single Everything is nothing. In the media it was promoted as an ending theme for Yomiuri TV television program Pro no Doumyaku. The single was included in the Giza Studio's compilation album Giza Studio Masterpiece Blend 2003.

In November 2003, they've release third studio album Home Again. It was their last album which enter to Top 200 Oricon Rankings.

=== 2004-2006 ===
In September 2004, they've released ninth single Never ever ~Aki ha Chotto Samishiku~. The single received re-arrangement in upcoming final studio album under subtitle album mix. In the media it was promoted as an ending theme for Nihon TV program Coming Doubt.

In July 2005, they've made guest appearance in "Rina Matsuri 2005 special REHEARSAL NIGHT".

In August 2005, they've released last single "Don't Stop Music". The composer, Aika Ohno self-cover this song in her self cover album. Silent Passage. In the media it was promoted as an ending theme for Tokyo Broadcasting System Television program Azaassu!.

In November 2005 they've released final studio album Sounds Good ~Himekuri Shashin~. The album charted at #270 on the Oricon charts in its first week.

In 2006 they released their first mini album "Instant Vacation". On their official website is included with preview songs and liner notes from members. The album track Ameagari Kirari was in media promoted as an ending theme for Iwate Menkoi Television program Beat Nicks and for Television Saitama program Dream Project Audition TV . The album failed enter to Oricon Weekly Charts.

=== 2007-2009 ===
In September 2007, they've released second mini album 6th Story. It's marked as their 6th album in the general discography history and includes only 6 tracks. The album enter to #286 Oricon Weekly Charts.

In February 2008, they began stream their own radio "the★tambourinesのmorning moka" till March 2009.

In September 2008, they've released their third and final mini album Switch. The mini album also failed enter to Oricon Weekly Charts.

In 2009, after releasing the compilation album My back tracks through official blog they've announced indefinite hiatus.

=== After hiatus announcement ===
Until 2011, the remaining members without vocalist kept the official blog active.

In 2012, Hiroshi joined in instrumental band "Sensation" as is active as of 2019.

Toshikazu is working as music teacher of drum in "Giza Musician School and Okada is professor in Osaka University of Arts.

== Discography ==
All songs were written by Ami Matsunaga, composed and arranged by Hiroshi Asai. They released ten singles, four studio, three mini and one "best of" albums.

=== Singles ===
	Release Day	Title	Rank
1st	2001/4/25	Easy Game	X
2nd	2001/7/18	Hijack Brandnew Days	X
3rd	2001/10/31	Mayonaka ni Kizuita funny love (真夜中気づいたfunny love)	X
4th	2002/3/20	Stay young	X
5th	2002/7/14	Wonder boy	99
6th	2002/12/18	Atsui Namida (アツイナミダ)	182
7th	2003/3/5	Afresh Wish	139
8th	2003/8/6	Everything Is Nothing	180
9th	2004/9/8	Never Ever ~Aki wa Chotto Samishiku~ (〜秋はちょっとさみしく〜)	100
10th	2005/8/31	Don't Stop Music	177

=== Studio albums ===
	Release Day	Title	Rank
1st	2002/9/28	My Back Pages	86
2nd	2003/4/23	Dizzy Season	115
3rd	2003/11/26	Home Again	175
4th	2005/11/2	Sounds Good ~Himekuri Shashin~	270

=== Mini albums ===
	Release Day	Title	Rank
1st	2006/8/2	Instant Vacation	X
2nd	2007/10/31	6th story	286
3rd	2008/9/24	Switch	X

=== Compilation album ===
	Release Day	Title	Rank
1st	2006/6/17	My back tracks	267

== Magazine appearances ==
From J-Groove Magazine:

- May 2001 Vol.7
- June 2001 Vol.8
- September 2001 Vol.11
- November 2001 Vol.13
- December 2001 Vol.14
- April 2002 Vol.18
- May 2002 Vol.19
- August 2002 Vol.22
- February 2003 Vol.28
- September 2003 Vol.35

From Music Freak Magazine:

- April 2001 Vol.77: Easy Game interview
- July 2001 Vol.80: Hijack brandnew days Interview
- September 2001 Vol.82: Release information
- October 2001 Vol.83: Mayonaka ni Kizuita Funny Love Interview
- January 2002 Vol.86: New Year Card
- March 2002 Vol.88: Stay Young Interview
- April 2002 Vol.89: My back pages interview and liner notes
- June 2002 Vol.91: Release information
- July 2002 Vol.92: Wonder Boy Interview
- November 2002 Vol.96: Release information
- December 2002 Vol.97: Atsui Namida Interview
- February 2003 Vol.99: Release information
- March 2003 Vol.100: Afresh Wish interview
- July 2003 Vol.104: Everything is nothing interview
- October 2003 Vol.107: Release information
- November 2003 Vol.108: Home Again interview
- August 2004 Vol.117: Never ever interview
- July 2005 Vol.128: Release information
- August 2005 Vol.129: Don't stop music interview
- November 2005 Vol.132: Sounds Good Interview and Liner Notes
- July 2006 Vol.140: Release information
- August 2006 Vol.141: Instant Vacation Interview and Liner Notes
- September 2007 Vol.153: Instant Vacation Interview and Liner Notes
- October 2007 Vol.154: 6th Story Interview
- August 2008 Vol.162: Instant Vacation Interview and Liner Notes
- September 2008 Vol.163: Switch Interview
- May 2009 Vol.173: Release information
- June 2009 Vol.174: My back tracks Interview
