= Garnet Crow =

Japanese musical group

- Origin: Japan
- Genres: Pop rock
- Years active: 1999–2013
- Labels: Tent House (1999); Giza Studio (2000–2013)
- Past members: Yuri Nakamura; Hitoshi Okamoto; Nana Azuki; Hirohito Furui
- Website: www.garnetcrow.com

YouTube information
- Channel: Official Garnet Crow
- Years active: 2020
- Subscribers: 50.9 thousand
- Views: 27.2 million
- Last updated: March 2, 2025

Garnet Crow (stylized as GARNET CROW) was a Japanese pop/rock band formed in 1999 and associated with the Giza Studio record label. Members included Yuri Nakamura, Hitoshi Okamoto, Nana Azuki, and Hirohito Furui, with Nakamura leading on vocals. Music produced by Garnet Crow has its roots in the neo acoustic genre, and representative works include "Flying", "Yume Mita Ato De", and "Spiral". Despite prolific early singles, the band neither performed live nor appeared on TV prior to 2002.

The mixed composition of Garnet Crow and Nakamura's deep vocals set the group apart from its contemporaries. Each individual member has also seen industry success: Nakamura and Azuki often share the limelight for Garnet Crow, but Okamoto has achieved a solo career and Furui is a sought-after music arranger – one of the highest paid in Japan.

On March 30, 2013, the band announced their disbandment, with their final concert scheduled to be held on June 9, 2013. On June 9, 2013, they announced that they would break up during the final concert.

On March 29, 2020, on the day of debut anniversary was launched on their official website a special 20th anniversary project. According to the Furui, it would not be a band reunion.

== Summary ==
The origin of the word "Garnet" in "Garnet Crow" emerged from the band's aspiration to achieve a musical depth akin to the depth of the color red often found in garnets. The word "Crow" was attached for its phonetic resonance. A further consideration in creating the band name was the enduring image left behind when it is translated to the eerie "scarlet crow" (深紅のカラス) in Japanese.

Since inception to disbanding, the four-person line-up of Garnet Crow remained constant. The two female and two male band consisted of lead vocalist Yuri Nakamura (中村由利, Nakamura Yuri), keyboardists Nana Azuki (ＡＺＵＫＩ七, Azuki Nana) and Hirohito Furui (古井弘人, Furui Hirohito), and guitarist Hitoshi Okamoto (岡本仁志, Okamoto Hitoshi). Furui was the band leader, but members were introduced in official sources with vocalist Nakamura receiving top billing. In 1999, the four members of what was to become Garnet Crow collaborated on the creation of a demo tape for singer Mai Kuraki's all-American independent record label. Upon hitting it off during the production process, they decided to seize the opportunity to create a band of their own. At that time, three of the members were already involved with the record production company Being Group, distributing for and supporting other artists, leaving Nakamura as the sole newcomer. Nakamura herself was aiming for a position that did not require her to front for the band like a musical director, but her associates made recommendations for her and she ended up in charge of vocals and musical composition.

In the creation process roles are clearly divided, with primary duties like composition, creation of lyrics, and editing for most Garnet Crow songs being handled by the members themselves. Particularly Nakamura's scores and Azuki's lyrics are the core foundation for all the band's songs. The works' roots lie in the Neo Acoustic genre, and at the time of its debut Garnet Crow's own musicality was hailed as "21st Century Neo-Neo Acoustics." From the 1999 debut and lasting nearly 2½ years the band mainly focused on CD production, but in 2002 Garnet Crow went live for the first time and since then has performed publicly more than 20 times, primarily in Japan's three major metropolitan centers: Tokyo, Nagoya, and Kyoto. Using the experience of their public performances, Garnet Crow began to consciously produce music with the live setting in mind, incorporating elements of Latin American music and Canzone into their work.

There exist undisclosed gaps in the individual members' personal work histories. And, until the release of the 2002 single "Yume mita ato de," Garnet Crow did not once appear on television. It is thought that the check on mass media exposure for Being Group-affiliated artists was a media control strategy by the company. However, since 2002 the band has performed on TV music programs. The members themselves have left remarks suggesting that television performances make them extremely tense.

== History ==
- 1999 - In the fall, the four members collaborate on the demo tape for Kuraki Mai's all-American debut and decide to form their own band after hitting it off during the production process. Garnet Crow makes its indie debut with the December 4 mini-album First Kaleidscope (Kimi no Uchi ni Tsuku Made Zutto Hashitte Yuku).
- 2000 - On March 29, Garnet Crow makes its mainstream debut with simultaneous release of the singles "Mysterious Eyes" and "Kimi no Uchi ni Tsuku Made Zutto Hashitte Yuku." This year, the band releases six singles in total.
- 2001 - Three singles and one original album are released.
- 2002 - Garnet Crow records the title song "Yume Mita Ato de" for the anime Detective Conan, and it hit number 6 on the Oricon weekly singles chart. Alongside this, the band performs for the first time on television and kicks off a live tour. The Garnet Crow fan club G-Net is established, and from June broadcast begins for the program Garnet Time, hosted by G-Net members. This year sees the release of three singles and one original album.
- 2003 - Garnet Crow performs alongside Mai Kuraki and Rina Aiuchi at the Giza Studio Valentine Concert in Tokyo and Osaka. Garnet Time ceases broadcast in October. The band releases two singles and one original album.
- 2004 - In addition to going on tour for the second time, the members of the band make a guest appearance and perform Garnet Crow hits during member Hitoshi Okamoto's solo live performance Thursday Live "Okamoto Night" at Hills Pan Kōjō in Osaka. The group performs again at the same location at a year-end live concert entitled Garnet Night. This year they release three singles and one original album.
- 2005 - Garnet Crow celebrates its five-year anniversary since its debut, goes on tour for the third time, records the title song "Kimi no Omoi Egaita Yume Atsumeru Heaven" for the anime MÄR, hosts a fan-club exclusive event and a memorial live concert, and releases its first "best of" album, Best. Members again make an appearance at Okamoto's solo live concert. Sayuri Iwata's single "Sorairo no Neko" is also released as a Garnet Crow composition. The band itself releases two singles in 2005.
- 2006 - Garnet Crow goes on tour for the fourth time and experiments with selling Digipak-bound CDs and packages containing bonus material CDs, original goods and other presents. The September single "Maboroshi" is the band's first to be selected as the title song for a TV drama. This year sees the release of four singles and one original album.
- 2007 - The band celebrates its seven-year anniversary since debut and performs events such as a fan club-exclusive concert and a special live concert at Ninna Temple in Kyoto. This year it releases four singles, two on sale simultaneously.
- 2008 - Garnet Crow goes on tour for the fifth time and all works released this year (two singles and one original album) break into the Oricon Top Ten.
- 2011 - Garnet Crow records the title song "Misty mystery" for the anime Detective Conan.

== Members ==
- Yuri Nakamura (vocals, music composition)
- Nana Azuki (keyboard, lyrics)
- Hirohito Furui (keyboard, music arrangement)
- Hitoshi Okamoto (guitar)

== Discography ==
Studio albums

- First Soundscope: Mizu no Nai Hareta Umi e (2001)
- Sparkle: Sujigakidōri no Sky Blue (2002)
- Crystallize: Kimi to Iu Hikari (2003)
- I'm Waiting 4 You (2004)
- The Twilight Valley (2006)
- Locks (2008)
- Stay: Yoake no Soul (2009)
- Parallel Universe (2010)
- Memories (2011)
- Terminus (2013)

== MINIQLO ==
The band have a subgroup, which is known as MINIQLO. (This comes from the phrase "Mini Garnet Crow".) The two members of Garnet Crow involved in this are Nakamura Yuri and Okamoto Hitoshi. Yuri sings and plays the piano, while Okamoto provides the chorus vocals and plays the guitar. MINIQLO have started to perform at Garnet Crow live concerts. So far, they have released two mini-albums, "Paralyzed Frequency" and "above all else!!", each of which features their versions of three Garnet Crow songs. So far, these CDs have only been available at 2010 live venues, and "above all else!!" was sold at the 2010-2011 Special Countdown Live.

== Magazine appearances ==
From J-Groove Magazine:

- November 2000 Vol.1
- December 2000 Vol.2
- January 2001 Vol.3
- March 2001 Vol.5
- June 2001 Vol.8
- September 2001 Vol.11
- January 2002 Vol.15
- April 2002 Vol.18
- May 2002 Vol.19
- June 2002 Vol.20
- August 2002 Vol.22
- September 2002 Vol.23
- November 2002 Vol.25
- December 2002 Vol.26
- January 2003 Vol.27
- February 2003 Vol.28
- September 2003 Vol.35
- October 2003 Vol.36
- December 2003 Vol.38
