= Zard discography =

- Studio albums: 11
- Live albums: 1
- Compilation albums: 12
- Tribute albums: 1
- Singles: 45
- Video albums: 8

The discography of Zard, a Japanese J-pop band, consists of eleven studio albums and forty-five singles. All songs were written by Izumi Sakai.

== Albums ==
=== Studio albums ===
Year	Title	Copies Sold	Peak	Certifications	Formats
1991	Good-bye My Loneliness	253,740	34	-	CD, cassette, digital download
1991	Mō Sagasanai (もう探さない)	333,080	36	-	CD, cassette, digital download
1992	Hold Me	1,065,190	2	Million	CD, cassette, digital download
1993	Yureru Omoi (揺れる想い)	2,239,354	1	2×Million	CD, digital download
1994	Oh My Love	2,002,070	1	2×Million	CD, digital download
1995	Forever You	1,773,930	1	Million	CD, digital download
1996	Today Is Another Day	1,655,430	1	Million	CD, digital download
1999	Eien (永遠)	1,149,931	1	Million	CD, digital download
2001	Toki no Tsubasa (時間(とき)の翼)	371,350	1	Platinum	CD, digital download
2004	Tomatteita Tokei ga Ima Ugokidashita (止まっていた時計が今動き出した)	212,494	2	Gold	CD, digital download
2005	Kimi to no Distance (君とのDistance)	151,840	3	Gold	CD, digital download

=== Compilation albums ===
Year	Title	Sold copies	Peak	Certifications	Formats
1997	Zard Blend: Sun & Stone	2,004,699	1	2×Million	CD, digital download
1999	Zard Best the Single Collection: Kiseki	3,034,054	1	3×Million	CD, digital download
1999	Zard Best: Requested Memorial	1,496,804	1	Million	CD, digital download
2001	Zard Blend II: Leaf & Snow	231,386	4	Gold	CD, digital download
2006	Golden Best: 15th Anniversary	942,220	1	Million	2CD, 2CD+DVD, digital download
2007	Soffio di Vento: Best of Izumi Sakai Selection	129,793	2	Gold	CD+DVD, digital download
2007	Brezza di Mare: Dedicated to Izumi Sakai	134,826	3	Gold	CD+DVD, digital download
2008	Zard Request Best: Beautiful Memory	229,014	1	Platinum	2CD+DVD, digital download
2008	Zard Premium Box 1991-2008 Complete Single Collection	N/A	N/A	-	49CD+DVD (Box Set)
2011	Zard Single Collection: 20th Anniversary	N/A	N/A	-	7CD (Box Set)
2012	Zard Album Collection: 20th Anniversary	6,712	26	-	12CD (Box Set)
2016	Zard Forever Best: 25th Anniversary	258,243	4	Gold	4CD (Blu-spec CD)
2025	Zard Best Request: 35th Anniversary	TBD	6	TBD	3CD (Blu-spec CD2)

=== Live albums ===
Year	Title	Sold copies	Peaks	Formats
2000	Zard Cruising & Live	305,550	2	2CD+VHS

=== Tribute albums ===
Year	Title	Sold copies	Peaks	Formats
2016	D-project with Zard	3,000	33	CD

== Singles ==
Year	Title	Peak	Copies Sold	Album
1991	Good-Bye My Loneliness	9	209,460	Good-Bye My Loneliness
1991	Fushigi ne... (不思議ね…)	30	31,090	Mō Sagasanai
1991	Mou Sagasanai (もう探さない)	39	36,940	Mō Sagasanai
1992	Nemurenai Yoru wo Daite (眠れない夜を抱いて)	8	458,480	Hold Me
1992	In My Arms Tonight	9	321,810	Yureru Omoi
1993	Makenaide (負けないで)	1	1,645,010	Yureru Omoi
1993	Kimi ga Inai (君がいない)	2	801,690	Yureru Omoi
1993	Yureru Omoi (揺れる想い)	1	1,396,420	Yureru Omoi
1993	Mou Sukoshi, Ato Sukoshi... (もう少し あと少し・・・)	2	843,880	Oh My Love
1993	Kitto Wasurenai (きっと忘れない)	1	872,130	Oh My Love
1994	Kono Ai ni Oyogi Tsukarete mo / Boy (この愛に泳ぎ疲れても / Boy)	1	887,190	Oh My Love
1994	Konna ni Soba ni Iru no ni (こんなにそばに居るのに)	1	787,660	Forever You
1994	Anata wo Kanjiteitai (あなたを感じていたい)	2	737,910	Forever You
1995	Just Believe in Love	2	655,960	Forever You
1995	Ai ga Mienai (愛が見えない)	2	720,790	Today Is Another Day
1995	Sayonara wa Ima mo Kono Mune ni Imasu (サヨナラは今もこの胸に居ます)	1	551,260	Today Is Another Day
1996	My Friend (マイ フレンド)	1	1,000,620	Today Is Another Day
1996	Kokoro wo Hiraite (心を開いて)	1	746,980	Today Is Another Day
1997	Don't You See!	1	602,760	Zard Blend: Sun & Stone
1997	Kimi ni Aitaku Nattara... (君に逢いたくなったら・・・)	2	635,840	Zard Blend: Sun & Stone
1997	Kaze ga Toori Nukeru Machi he (風が通り抜ける街へ)	3	281,130	Eien
1997	Eien (永遠)	1	628,770	Eien
1997	My Baby Grand ~Nukumori ga Hoshikute~ (My Baby Grand 〜ぬくもりが欲しくて〜)	3	331,840	Eien
1998	Iki mo Dekinai (息もできない)	3	240,740	Eien
1998	Unmei no Roulette Mawashite (運命のルーレット廻して)	1	247,560	Eien
1998	Atarashii Door ~Fuyu no Himawari~ (新しいドア ~冬のひまわり~)	3	205,170	Eien
1998	Good Day	2	223,950	Eien
1999	Mind Games	1	147,130	Zard Best: Requested Memorial
1999	Sekai wa Kitto Mirai no Naka (世界はきっと未来の中)	2	201,410	Toki no Tsubasa
1999	Itai Kurai Kimi ga Afureteiru yo (痛いくらい君があふれているよ)	5	124,730	Toki no Tsubasa
1999	Kono Namida Hoshi ni Nare (この涙星になれ)	5	129,700	Toki no Tsubasa
2000	Get U're Dream	4	241,220	Toki no Tsubasa
2000	Promised You	6	115,360	Toki no Tsubasa
2002	Sawayakana Kimi no Kimochi (さわやかな君の気持ち)	4	69,740	Tomatteita Tokei ga Ima Ugokidashita
2003	Ashita wo Yume Mite (明日を夢見て)	4	62,049	Tomatteita Tokei ga Ima Ugokidashita
2003	Hitomi Tojite (瞳閉じて)	4	44,208	Tomatteita Tokei ga Ima Ugokidashita
2003	Motto Chikaku de Kimi no Yokogao Mitetai (もっと近くで君の横顔見ていたい)	8	50,489	Tomatteita Tokei ga Ima Ugokidashita
2004	Kakegae no Nai Mono (かけがえのないもの)	4	46,244	Kimi to no Distance
2004	Kyou wa Yukkuri Hanasou (今日はゆっくり話そう)	5	33,384	Kimi to no Distance
2005	Hoshi no Kagayaki yo/Natsu wo Matsu Sail no You ni (星のかがやきよ／夏を待つセイル(帆)のように)	2	79,816	Kimi to no Distance
2006	Kanashii Hodo Anata ga Suki/Karatto Ikou! (悲しいほど貴方が好き／カラッといこう!)	6	33,957	Brezza di mare: Dedicated to Izumi Sakai/Zard Single Collection
2006	Heart ni Hi wo Tsukete (ハートに火をつけて)	10	26,944	Golden Best: 15th Anniversary
2007	Glorious Mind (グロリアス マインド)	2	84,027	Zard Request Best: Beautiful Memory
2008	Tsubasa wo Hirogete/Ai wa Kurayami no Naka de (翼を広げて／愛は暗闇の中で)	3	83,694	Zard Forever Best: 25th Anniversary
2009	Sunao ni Ienakute (素直に言えなくて)	5	36,178	Zard Forever Best: 25th Anniversary

== DVD ==
Year	Title	Oricon Rank	Sold copies
2005	What A Beautiful Moment Zard	1	159,354
2006	Le Portfolio 1991-2006 Zard	1	180,027
2011	What a beautiful memory 2007	16	X
2011	What a beautiful memory 2008	18	X
2011	What a beautiful memory 2009	15	X
2011	What a beautiful memory ~forever you~	1	X
2016	Zard Music Video Collection ~25th Anniversary~	2	X
2016	What a beautiful memory ~25th Anniversary~	3	X
2021	ZARD Streaming LIVE“What a beautiful memory: 30th Anniversary”	17	x
2022	ZARD 30th Anniversary LIVE“What a beautiful memory: Kiseki”	4	x
