= Golden Best: 15th Anniversary =

Compilation album by Zard
- Released: October 25, 2006
- Recorded: 1991–2006
- Genre: Pop rock; J-pop
- Length: Disc 1: 63:01; Disc 2: 59:33
- Label: B-Gram
- Producer: Izumi Sakai

Zard compilation chronology
Zard Best ~Request Memorial~ (1999)	Golden Best: 15th Anniversary (2006)	Zard Request ~beautiful memory~ (2008)

Golden Best: 15th Anniversary is Zard's fifth compilation album. Released in October 2006 under B-Gram Records. The album peaked at number 1 on the weekly Oricon albums chart, charted for eighty-one weeks and sold 942,220 units.

Following the death of the band's vocalist Izumi Sakai in May 2007, the album immediately took the sixth spot on the Oricon daily ranking after fans bought out copies of the release. The album has been certified a million-selling album by the RIAJ.

== Track listing ==
All songs has been written by Izumi Sakai.

=== Disc 1 ===
No.	Title	Music	Arrangers	Length
1.	"Good-bye My Loneliness" (debut single)	Tetsurō Oda	Masao Akashi	4:34
2.	"Nemurenai Yoru wo Daite (眠れない夜を抱いて)" (4th single)	Tetsurō Oda	Masao Akashi, Daisuke Ikeda	4:26
3.	"In My Arms Tonight" (5th single)	Michiya Haruhata (Tube)	Masao Akashi	4:21
4.	"Makenaide (負けないで)" (6th single)	Tetsurō Oda	Takeshi Hayama	3:46
5.	"Kimi ga Inai (君がいない)" (7th single)	Seiichiro Kuribayashi	Masao Akashi	3:57
6.	"Yureru Omoi (揺れる想い)" (8th single)	Tetsurou Oda	Masao Akashi	3:49
7.	"Mō Sukoshi, Ato Sukoshi... (もう少し あと少し…)" (9th single)	Seiichiro Kuribayashi	Masao Akashi	4:47
8.	"Kitto Wasurenai (きっと忘れない)" (10th single)	Tetsurō Oda	Masao Akashi	4:05
9.	"Kono Ai ni Oyogi Tsukarete mo (この愛に泳ぎ疲れても)" (11th single)	Tetsurō Oda	Masao Akashi	4:18
10.	"Oh My Love" (5th album "Oh My Love")	Tetsurō Oda	Masao Akashi	4:33
11.	"Konna ni Soba ni Iru no ni (こんなにそばに居るのに)" (12th single)	Seiichiro Kuribayashi	Daisuke Ikeda	5:32
12.	"Anata wo Kanjiteitai (あなたを感じていたい)" (13th single)	Tetsurou Oda	Tetsurou Oda	5:10
13.	"Ai ga Mienai (愛が見えない)" (15th single)	Masazumi Ozawa (Pamelah)	Takeshi Hayama	4:02
14.	"Sayonara wa Ima mo Kono Mune ni Imasu (サヨナラは今もこの胸に居ま)" (16th single)	Seiichiro Kuribayashi	Takeshi Hayama	5:04

=== Disc 2 ===
No.	Title	Music	Arrangers	Length
1.	"My Friend (マイ フレンド)" (17th single)	Tetsurō Oda	Takeshi Hayama	4:23
2.	"Kokoro wo Hiraite (心を開いて)" (18th single)	Tetsurō Oda	Daisuke Ikeda	4:08
3.	"Today Is Another Day" (7th album "Today Is Another Day")	Tetsurō Oda	Daisuke Ikeda	5:17
4.	"Don't You See!" (19th single)	Seiichiro Kuribayashi	Takeshi Hayama	5:00
5.	"Eien (永遠)" (22nd single)	Akihito Tokunaga	Akihito Tokunaga	3:48
6.	"My Baby Grand ~Nukumori ga Hoshikute~ (My Baby Grand～ぬくもりが欲しくて～)" (23rd single)	Tetsurō Oda	Daisuke Ikeda	4:12
7.	"Unmei no Roulette Mawashite (運命のルーレット廻して)" (25th single)	Seiichiro Kuribayashi	Daisuke Ikeda	4:55
8.	"Get U're Dream" (32nd single)	Aika Ohno	Takeshi Hayama	5:13
9.	"Motto Chikaku de Kimi no Yokogao Mitetai (もっと近くで君の横顔見ていたい)" (37th single)	Aika Ohno	Daisuke Ikeda	4:28
10.	"Kyō wa Yukkuri Hanasō (今日はゆっくり話そう)" (39th single)	Aika Ohno	Akihito Tokunaga	4:48
11.	"Hoshi no Kagayaki yo (星のかがやきよ)" (40th single)	Aika Ohno	Takeshi Hayama	3:49
12.	"Natsu wo Matsu Sail no Yō ni (夏を待つセイル(帆)のように)" (40th single)	Aika Ohno	Takeshi Hayama	4:36
13.	"Heart ni Hi wo Tsukete (ハートに火をつけて)" (42nd single)	Aika Ohno	Takeshi Hayama	4:58

== In media ==
- Good-bye My Loneliness: theme song for Japanese television drama "Kekkon no Risou to Genjitsu"
- Nemurenai Yoru wo Daite: ending theme for TV Asahi program "Tonight"
- In My Arms Tonight: theme song for Tokyo Broadcasting System Television television drama Gakkou ga Abunai
- Makenaide: theme song for Nippon Television 24-hour TV
- Kimi ga Inai: theme song for Japanese television drama "Kanojona Kiraina Kanojo"
- Yureru Omoi: commercial song for Pocari Sweat
- Mō Sukoshi, Ato Sukoshi...: ending theme for TV Asahi television drama Lullaby Keiji
- Kitto Wasurenai: theme song for Fuji TV television drama Shiratori Reiko de Gozaimasu!
- Kono Ai ni Oyogi Tsukaretemo: opening theme for Japanese television drama "Ai to Giwaku no Suspense"
- Konna ni Soba ni Iru no ni: commercial song of Miki Corporation's "Boutique Joy"
- Anata wo Kanjiteitai: commercial song for NTT DoCoMo
- Ai ga Mienai: commercial song of FTShiseido's Sea Breeze 1995
- Sayonara wa Ima mo Kono Mune ni Imasu: theme song for movie (based from television drama) Shiratori Reiko de Gozaimasu!
- My Friend: 4th ending theme for Anime television series Slam Dunk
- Kokoro wo Hiraite: commercial song for Pocari Sweat
- Today Is Another Day: theme song for Anime television series Yawara!
- Don't You See!: ending theme for Anime television series Dragon Ball GT
- Eien: theme song of Japanese television drama adaptation of the novel A Lost Paradise
- My Baby Grand ~Nukumori ga Hoshikute~: commercial film song for company NTT DoCoMo's DoCoMo 1997 Fuyu
- Unmei no Roulette Mawashite: opening theme for Anime television series Detective Conan
- Get U're Dream: theme song for NHK's Sydney Olympics
- Kyō wa Yukkuri Hanasō: commercial song of Gekkeikan's Tsuki
- Hoshi no Kagayaki yo: opening theme for Anime television series Detective Conan
- Natsu wo Matsu Sail no You ni: theme song for anime movie Detective Conan: Strategy Above the Depths
- Heart ni Hi wo Tsukete: theme song for Tokyo Broadcasting System Television program Suteki ni common!
