= Case Closed discography =

- The Meitantei Conan version of the single Jûgoya Kuraishisu (Kimi ni Aitai) by Hundred Percent Free and published by Pure Infinity on January 27, 2011
- Soundtrack albums: 22
- Compilation albums: 9
- Singles: 87
- Image albums: 2

Case Closed, known as Meitantei Conan (名探偵コナン, lit. Great Detective Conan, officially translated as Detective Conan) in Japan, is a Japanese detective manga series written and illustrated by Gosho Aoyama. The series is serialized in Shogakukan's Weekly Shōnen Sunday since February 2, 1994. It was adapted into an anime series produced by Yomiuri Telecasting Corporation (YTV) and TMS Entertainment where it premiered on Yomiuri TV, Nippon Television and other NNS stations. The first episode premiered on January 8, 1996. It is currently ongoing and numbers over 1000 episodes, making it the eleventh longest running anime series. The anime spin off has over twenty animated featured films.

Katsuo Ono (大野 克夫, Ono Katsuo), who composed and arranged the music in the Case Closed animation, produced four original soundtracks for the TV anime and one original soundtrack for each of the seventeen films totaling nineteen tracks. The best of his work were compiled into three collections, Detective Conan Original Soundtrack Super Best, Detective Conan Original Soundtrack Super Best 2, and Detective Conan TV Original Soundtrack Selection Best. Two image albums were also created featuring the voice actors singing as their character.The Best of Detective Conan and The Best of Detective Conan 2 albums collectively sold over 2.3 million copies, while singles from The Best of Detective Conan 3 collectively sold over 1.5 million copies. On July 25, 2017, the singer Mai Kuraki was awarded a Guinness World Record for singing the most theme songs in a single anime series, having sung 21 songs for Detective Conan, since the hit song "Secret of My Heart" (2000). In total, the series' albums and singles have collectively sold over 9.4 million units and grossed approximately ¥15 billion ($185 million) in Japan.

== Compilation albums ==
Year	Title	Charts		Sales	Revenue (est.)	Ref.
Year	Title	Peak	Weeks	Sales	Revenue (est.)	Ref.
1996	Detective Conan Theme Collection (Note: 名探偵コナン 主題歌集, Meitantei Conan Shudaika Shuu): Released: December 16, 1996; Label: Kitty Records KTCR-1409	—				
1997	Detective Conan Original Soundtrack Super Best (Note: 名探偵コナン オリジナル・サウンドトラック スーパー・ベスト, Meitantei Conan Orijinaru Saundotorakku Sūpā Besuto): Released: November 27, 1997; Label: Polydor Records POCX-1082	—				
2000	The Best of Detective Conan: Released: November 29, 2000; Label: Zain Records ZACL-1055	2	33	1,600,000	¥4,608,000,000	
2003	The Best of Detective Conan 2: Released: December 10, 2003; Label: B-Gram Records JBCJ-9007	3	26	700,000	¥2,016,000,000	
2003	Detective Conan Original Soundtrack Super Best 2 (Note: 名探偵コナン オリジナル・サウンドトラック スーパー・ベスト 2, Meitantei Conan Orijinaru Saundotorakku Sūpā Besuto 2): Released: December 17, 2003; Label: Universal Music Group UPCH-1318	—				
2006	The Best of Detective Conan ~The Movies Themes Collection~: Released: December 13, 2006; Label: Zain Records JBCJ-9021	29	11			
2007	Detective Conan TV Original Soundtrack Selection Best (Note: 名探偵コナン TVオリジナル・サウンドトラック Selection Best, Meitantei Conan TV Orijinaru Saundotorakku Selection Best): Released: December 5, 2007; Label: B-Gram Records JBCJ-9025/6	—				
2008	The Best of Detective Conan 3: Released: August 6, 2008; Label: B-Gram Records JBCJ-9030/1	5	18	69,947	¥230,265,524	
2011	The Best of Detective Conan 4: Release: December 14, 2011; Label: B-Gram Records JBCJ-9044/5, JBCJ-9042/3 (Limited Edition)	5	18			
2014	The Best of Detective Conan 5: Release: October 22, 2011; Label: B-Gram Records JBCJ-9052, JBCJ-9051 (Limited Edition)	2	18			
2017	Detective Conan Movie Theme Song Collection ~"20" All Songs~ (Note: 劇場版 名探偵コナン 主題歌集 ～ 20 All Songs～, Gekijyouban Meitantei Conan Shudaika ShuuTwentyAll Songs): Release: March 22, 2017; Label: Being JBCZ-9047/8, JBCZ-9045/6 (Limited Edition)	6	19			
2017	Mai Kuraki x Meitantei Conan Collaboration Best 21: Shinjitsu wa Itsumo Uta ni Aru! (Note: 倉木麻衣×名探偵コナン COLLABORATION BEST 21 -真実はいつも歌にある！-): Release: October 25, 2017; Label: Northern Music	4	35	71,110	¥199,108,000	
Total album sales				2,441,057	¥7,053,373,524 ($87,160,988)	
"—" denotes releases that did not chart.

== Singles ==
Year	Title	Artist	Charts		Sales	Revenue (est.)	Ref.
Year	Title	Artist	Peak	Weeks	Sales	Revenue (est.)	Ref.
1996	Detective Conan: Main Theme (「名探偵コナン」メイン・テーマ, Meitantei Conan Mein Tēma): Released: January 25, 1996; Label: Polydor Records PODX-1007	Katsuo Ono	97	1			
1996	Mune ga Doki Doki (胸がドキドキ, lit. "My Heart Pounds"): Released: February 21, 1996; Label: Kitty Records KTDR-2150; Used as the opening theme for episodes 1–30.	The High-Lows	10	9			
1996	Step by Step: Released: March 4, 1996; Label: Mercury Music Entertainment PHDL-1055; Used as the ending theme for episodes 1–26.	Ziggy	10	7			
1996	Meikyuu no Lovers (迷宮のラヴァーズ, lit. "Lover's Labyrinth"): Released: October 7, 1996; Label: Polydor Records PODH-1323; Used as the ending theme for episodes 27–51.	Heath	10	6			
1996	Feel Your Heart: Released: October 28, 1996; Label: Polydor Records PODH-1329; Used as the opening theme for episodes 31–52.	Velvet Garden	29	4			
1997	Happy Birthday: Released: April 23, 1997; Label: Polydor Records PODH-1354; Used as the theme music for the first film Case Closed: The Time Bombed Skyscraper.	Kyoko (杏子)	92	1			
1997	Kimi Ga Ireba (キミがいれば, lit. "If You are Here"): Released: April 23, 1997; Label: Polydor Records PODX-1023	Iori (伊織)	—				
1997	Hikari to Kage no Roman (光と影のロマン, lit. "Romance of Light and Shadow"): Released: May 14, 1997; Label: Zain Records ZADL-1070; Used as the ending theme for episodes 52–70.	Keiko Utoku	20	6			
1997	Nazo (謎, lit. "Mystery"): Released: May 28, 1997; Label: Zain Records ZADS-1001; Used as the opening theme for episodes 53–96.	Miho Komatsu	9	32	325,850	¥341,816,650	
1997	Kimi ga inai Natsu (君がいない夏, lit. "Summer Without You"): Released: August 27, 1997; Label: B-Gram Records JBDJ-1032; Used as the ending theme for episodes 71–83.	Deen	10	7	131,000	¥78,600,000	
1997	Boku ga Iru (ぼくがいる, lit. "I am Here"): Released: September 26, 1997; Label: Polydor Records PODX-1031	Iori (伊織)	—				
1998	Negaigoto Hitotsu Dake (願い事ひとつだけ, lit. "Only One Wish"): Released: January 14, 1998; Label: Amemura O-town Record AODS-1003; Used as the ending theme for episodes 84–108.	Miho Komatsu	8	17	294,580	¥309,014,420	
1998	Unmei no Roulette Mawashite (運命のルーレット廻して, lit. "Spinning the Roulette of Destiny"): Released: September 17, 1998; Label: B-Gram Records JBDJ-1041; The song Unmei no Ruuretto Mawashite was used as the opening theme for episodes 97–123.; The song Shōjo no goro ni modotta mitai ni (少女の頃に戻ったみたいに, lit. "Like I've Returned to When I was a Teenage Girl") found on the single was used for the second film Case Closed: The Fourteenth Target.	Zard	1	9	247,560	¥259,690,440	
1998	Kōri no Ue ni Tatsu Yō ni (氷の上に立つように, lit. Like Standing on Ice): Released: October 14, 1998; Label: Amemura O-town Record AODS-1006; Used as the ending theme for episodes 109–131.	Miho Komatsu	5	14	162,000	¥169,938,000	
1998	Truth (A Great Detective of Love): Released: November 26, 1998; Label: WEA Japan WPD7-9201; Used as the opening theme for episodes 124–142.	Two-Mix	3	13	228,710	¥239,916,790	
1999	Still for your love: Released: April 14, 1999; Label: Giza Studio GZDA-1004; Used as the ending theme for episodes 132–152.	Rumania Montevideo	9	13			
1999	Giri Giri Chop (ギリギリ Chop, lit. "Barely Chop"): Released: June 9, 1999; Label: Rooms Records BMDR-2018; The song Giri Giri Chop was used as the opening theme for episodes 143–167.; The song One was used for the third film Case Closed: The Last Wizard of the Century.	B'z	1	11	805,000	¥844,445,000	
1999	Free Magic: Released: October 14, 1999; Label: Rooms Records BMDR-2018; Used as the ending theme for episodes 153–179.	Wag	30	3			
2000	Mysterious Eyes: Released: March 29, 2000; Label: Giza Studio GZCA-1028; Used as the opening theme for episodes 168–204.	Garnet Crow	20	11	61,040	¥65,923,200	
2000	Secret of My Heart: Released: April 26, 2000; Label: Giza Studio GZCA-1030; Used as the ending theme for episodes 180–204.	Mai Kuraki	2	16	1,000,000	¥1,296,000,000	
2000	Anata ga Iru Kara (あなたがいるから, lit. "Because You Are Here"): Released: June 21, 2000; Label: Giza Studio GZCA-1038	Miho Komatsu	9	4	56,000	¥72,576,000	
2000	Koi wa Suriru, Shokku, Sasupensu (恋はスリル,ショック,サスペンス, lit. "Love is Thrill, Shock, Suspense"): Released: October 25, 2000; Label: Giza Studio GZCA-1049; Used as the opening theme for episodes 205–230.	Rina Aiuchi	5	6	105,260	¥136,416,960	
2000	Natsu no Maboroshi (夏の幻, lit. "Summer's Illusion"): Released: October 25, 2000; Label: Giza Studio GZCA-1050; Used as the ending theme for episodes 205–218.	Garnet Crow	20	5	40,950	¥44,226,000	
2001	Tsumetai umi (冷たい海, lit. "Cold Sea") / Start in my life: Released: February 7, 2001; Label: Giza Studio GZCA-1063; The song Start in my Life was used as the ending theme for episodes 219–232.	Mai Kuraki	2	11			
2001	always: Released: June 6, 2001; Label: Giza Studio GZCA-1083; Used for episodes 233–247 and the fifth film, Case Closed: Countdown to Heaven.; Used as the ending theme for episodes 233–247.	Mai Kuraki	2	7	219,940	¥285,042,240	
2001	Destiny: Released: June 13, 2001; Label: Giza Studio GZCA-1085; Used as the opening theme for episodes 231–258.	Miki Matsuhashi	22	5			
2001	Aoi Aoi Kono Chikyū ni (青い青いこの地球に, lit. "The Blue in the Blue Earth"): Released: October 31, 2001; Label: Giza Studio GZCA-2019; Used as the ending theme for episodes 248–265.	Azumi Uehara	9	8	83,820	¥108,630,720	
2002	Winter Bells: Released: January 17, 2002; Label: Giza Studio GZCA-2026; Used as the opening theme for episodes 259–270.	Mai Kuraki	1	9	258,310	¥334,769,760	
2002	Yume mita Ato de (夢みたあとで, lit. "After I Dream"): Released: March 13, 2002; Label: Giza Studio GZCA-2031; Used as the ending theme for episodes 266–287.	Garnet Crow	6	10	93,300	¥120,916,800	
2002	I can't stop my love for you: Released: April 10, 2002; Label: Giza Studio GZCA-2031; Used as the opening theme for episodes 271–305.	Rina Aiuchi	2	6	101,880	¥132,036,480	
2002	Mushoku (無色, lit. "Colorless"): Released: April 10, 2002; Label: Giza Studio GZCA-2050; Used as the ending theme for episodes 288–299.	Azumi Uehara	5	8	49,350	¥63,957,600	
2003	Time after time ～Hana mau machi de～ (～花舞う街で～, lit. "(In the Town of Dancing Flowers)"): Released: March 5, 2003; Label: Giza Studio GZCA-7011; Used for the theme music for the seventh film Case Closed: Crossroad in the Ancient Capital.	Mai Kuraki	3	17	144,461	¥148,505,908	
2003	Ashita wo Yume Mite (明日を夢見て, lit. "Dreaming of tomorrow"): Released: April 9, 2003; Label: B-Gram Records JBCJ-6001; Used as the ending theme for episodes 307–328.	Zard	4	8	62,049	¥63,786,372	
2003	Kaze no Rarara (風のららら, lit. "Wind of Lalala"): Released: May 28, 2003; Label: Giza Studio GZCA-7022; Used as the opening theme for episodes 306–332.	Mai Kuraki	3	9	96,198	¥98,891,544	
2003	~Kimi to Iu Hikari~ (〜君という光〜, lit. "Your Light"): Released: September 10, 2003; Label: Giza Studio GZCA-7031; Used as the ending theme for episodes 329–349.	Garnet Crow	7	10	35,190	¥36,175,320	
2003	Kimi to Yakusoku Shita Yasashii Ano Basho Made (君と約束した優しいあの場所まで, lit. "The Paradise I Promised You"): Released: October 29, 2003; Label: Giza Studio GZCA-7034; Used as the opening theme for episodes 333–355.	U-ka Saegusa in dB	8	6	33,955	¥34,905,740	
2004	Nemuru Kimi no Yokogao ni Hohoemi wo (眠る君の横顔に微笑みを, lit. "The Smile on your Sleeping Face"): Released: March 3, 2004; Label: Giza Studio GZCA-7042; Used as the ending theme for episodes 350–375.	U-ka Saegusa in dB	12	7	25,344	¥26,053,632	
2004	Dream × Dream: Released: April 28, 2004; Label: Giza Studio GZCA-7047; Used for the eighth film Case Closed: Magician of the Silver Sky.	Rina Aiuchi	6	8	60,398	¥62,089,144	
2004	Start: Released: May 26, 2004; Label: Giza Studio GZCA-7048; Used as the opening theme for episodes 356–393.	Rina Aiuchi	8	8	42,833	¥44,032,324	
2004	Wasurezaki (忘れ咲き, lit. "Forget to Bloom"): Released: November 17, 2004; Label: Giza Studio GZCA-4028; Used as the ending theme for episodes 376–397.	Garnet Crow	14	6	25,950	¥33,631,200	
2005	Hoshi no Kagayaki yo/Natsu wo Matsu Sail no Yō ni (星のかがやきよ / 夏を待つセイル（帆）のように, lit. "Shining of the Stars / Like a Sail That Waits for Summer"): Released: April 20, 2005; Label: B-Gram Records JBCJ-6006; The song Hoshi no Kagayakiyo was used as the opening for episodes 394–414.; The song Natsu o Matsu Seiru no Youni was used for the ninth film Case Closed: Strategy Above the Depths.	Zard	2	13	79,000	¥81,212,000	
2005	June Bride 〜Anata Shika Mienai〜 (ジューンブライド〜あなたしか見えない〜, lit. "June Bride (Only You I See)"): Released: June 15, 2005; Label: Giza Studio GZCA-4043; Used as the ending theme for episodes 398–406.	U-ka Saegusa in dB	12	5	21,712	¥28,138,752	
2005	Sekai Tomete (世界 止めて, lit. "World Stops"): Released: August 10, 2005; Label: Giza Studio GZCA-4047; Used as the ending theme for episodes 407–416.	Shiori Takei (竹井詩織里, Takei Shiori)	27	6			
2005	Growing of my heart: Released: November 9, 2005; Label: Giza Studio GZCA-4054; Used as the opening theme for episodes 415–424.	Mai Kuraki	7	10	62,299	¥80,739,504	
2005	Thank You For Everything: Released: November 9, 2005; Label: Giza Studio GZCA-7064; Used as the ending theme for episodes 417–424.	Sayuri Iwata	16	6			
2005	Omoide Tachi (Omoide) (想い出たち 〜想い出〜, lit. Our Memories (Memories)): Released: December 28, 2005; Label: Universal Music Group UPCH-5356	Minami Takayama	86	4			
2006	Shōdō (衝動, lit. "Impulse"): Released: January 25, 2006; Label: Vermillion Records BMCV-5009; Used as the opening theme for episodes 425–437.	B'z	1	19	404,370	¥436,719,600	
2006	Kanashii Hodo Anata ga Suki (悲しいほど 貴方が好き, lit. "I miss you so much I'm sad"): Released: March 8, 2006; Label: B-Gram Records JBCJ-6007; The song Kanashii Hodo Anata ga Suki was used as the ending theme for episodes 425–437.	Zard	6	14	32,000	¥34,560,000	
2006	Yuruginai Mono Hitotsu (ゆるぎないものひとつ, lit. "One Sure Thing"): Released: April 12, 2006; Label: Vermillion Records BMCV-5009; Used for the tenth film Case Closed: The Private Eyes' Requiem.	B'z	1	12	233,375	¥252,045,000	
2006	Mou Kimi dake wo Hanashitari wa Shinai (もう君だけを離したりはしない, lit. "I won't let you go anymore"): Released: May 31, 2006; Label: Giza Studio GZCA-7073; Used as the ending theme for episodes 438–458.	Aya Kamiki	11	7	21,967	¥23,724,360	
2006	100 mo no Tobira (100もの扉, lit. "100 Doors"): Released: June 14, 2006; Label: Giza Studio GZCA-4070; Used as the opening theme for episodes 438–456.	Rina Aiuchi and U-ka Saegusa in dB	8	6	29,975	¥48,559,500	
2006	Shiroi Yuki (白い雪, lit. "White Snow"): Released: December 20, 2006; Label: Giza Studio GZCA-7083; Used as the ending theme for episodes 459–470.	Mai Kuraki	4	11	43,721	¥47,218,680	
2007	Kumo ni Notte (雲に乗って, lit. "Ride on a Cloud"): Released: January 31, 2007; Label: Giza Studio GZCA-4086; Used as the opening theme for episodes 457–474.	U-ka Saegusa in dB	12	5	11,701	¥15,164,496	
2007	Nanatsu no Umi o Wataru Kaze no Youni (七つの海を渡る風のように, lit. "Like the Wind that Blows Across the Seven Seas"): Released: April 11, 2007; Label: Giza Studio GZCA-4093; Used as the theme music for the eleventh film Case Closed: Jolly Roger in the Deep Azure.	Rina Aiuchi and U-ka Saegusa in dB	6	10	36,587	¥47,416,752	
2007	I still believe ~Tameiki~ (I still believe 〜ため息〜, lit. "I still believe (Sigh)"): Released: May 30, 2007; Label: Northern Music VNCM-4001; Used as the ending theme for episodes 471–486.	Yumi Shizukusa (滴草由実, Shizukusa Yumi)	50	4	3,642	¥4,720,032	
2007	Namida no Iesutadee (涙のイエスタデー, lit. "Tearful Yesterday"): Released: July 4, 2007; Label: Giza Studio GZCA-4096; Used as the opening theme for episodes 475–486.	Garnet Crow	10	9	23,829	¥30,882,384	
2007	Sekai wa Mawaru to iu Keredo (世界はまわると言うけれど, lit. "They Say the World Revolves"): Released: November 14, 2007; Label: Giza Studio GZCA-4100; Used as the ending theme for episodes 487–490.	Garnet Crow	12	6	19,414	¥25,160,544	
2007	Glorious Mind (グロリアス マインド, Gurorisu Maindo): Released: December 12, 2007; Label: B-Gram Records JBCJ-4003; Used as the opening theme for episodes 487–490.	Zard	2	10	84,027	¥108,898,992	
2008	Yukidoke no Ano Kawa no Nagare no yō ni (雪どけのあの川の流れのように, lit. "Like the Flowing of a Thawing River"): Released: February 27, 2008; Label: Giza Studio GZCA-7105; Used as the ending theme for episodes 491–504.	U-ka Saegusa in dB	19	4	12,183	¥15,789,168	
2008	Tsubasa wo Hirogete/Ai wa Kurayami no Naka de (翼を広げて / 愛は暗闇の中で, lit. "Spread My Wings / Love is Within the Darkness"): Released: April 9, 2008; Label: B-Gram Records JBCJ-6011; The song Ai wa Kurayami no Naka de was used as the opening theme for episodes 491–504.; The song Tsubasa o Hirogete was used for the theme music for the twelfth film Case Closed: Full Score of Fear.	Zard	3	12	83,000	¥107,568,000	
2008	Ichibyōgoto ni Love for You (一秒ごとに Love for you, lit. "Every Second I Love for You"): Released: July 9, 2008; Label: Northern Music VNCM-6008; Used as the opening theme for episodes 505–514.	Mai Kuraki	7	7	29,640	¥32,011,200	
2008	Summer Memories: Released: August 6, 2008; Label: Northern Music VNCM-6008; Used as the ending theme for episodes 505–514.	Aya Kamiki	35	3	5,469	¥5,906,520	
2008	Go Your Own Way: Released: October 29, 2008; Label: Northern Music VNCM-4002; Used as the ending theme for episodes 515–520.	Yumi Shizukusa (滴草由実, Shizukusa Yumi)	77	2			
2008	Mysterious: Released: November 19, 2008; Label: Giza Studio GZCA-7129; Used as the opening theme for episodes 515–520.	Naifu	36	7	6,025	¥6,507,000	
2009	Koigokoro Kagayaki Nagara (恋心輝きながら, lit. "Radiance of my Love"): Released: February 4, 2009; Label: Giza Studio GZCA-7135; Used as the ending theme for episodes 521–529.	Naifu	70	2	2,175	¥2,349,000	
2009	Puzzle/Revive: Released: April 1, 2009; Label: Northern Music VNCM-6012; The song Revive was used as the opening for episodes 521–529.; The song Puzzle was used for the thirteenth film Case Closed: The Raven Chaser.	Mai Kuraki	3	11			
2009	Everlasting Luv / Bambino (Banbīno) (～バンビーノ～, (Bambino)): Released: April 8, 2009; Label: Zain Records ZACL-4013; Used as the opening theme for episodes 530–546.	Breakerz	2	8	31,188	¥40,419,648	
2009	Doing all right: Released: May 20, 2009; Label: Giza Studio GZCA-7141; Used as the ending theme for episodes 530–539.	Garnet Crow	10	5	17,055	¥18,419,400	
2009	Hikari (光, lit. "Light"): Released: July 15, 2009; Label: Zain Records ZACL-4014; Used as the ending theme for episodes 540–561.	Breakerz	6	6	24,474	¥37,004,688	
2009	Magic: Released: October 21, 2009; Label: Giza Studio GZCA-7153; Used as the opening theme for episodes 547–564.	Rina Aiuchi	17	4	8,590	¥9,277,200	
2010	Hello Mr. my yesterday: Released: January 27, 2010; Label: Pure Infinity JBCP-6002; Used as the ending theme for episodes 562–587.	Hundred Percent Free	59	3	2,889	¥3,120,120	
2010	Over Drive: Released: April 14, 2010; Label: Giza Studio GZCA-7156; Used for the fourteenth film Case Closed: The Lost Ship in the Sky.	Garnet Crow	4	7	21,776	¥23,518,080	
2010	Summer Time Gone: Released: August 31, 2010; Label: Northern Music VNCM-6018; Used as the opening theme for episodes 583–601.	Mai Kuraki	4	8	33,378	¥36,048,240	
2011	Jûgoya Kuraishisu (Kimi ni Aitai) (十五夜クライシス～君に逢いたい～, lit. "Full Moon Night's Crisis (I Want to See You)"): Released: January 27, 2011; Label: Pure Infinity JBCP-6007; Used as the ending theme for episodes 602–609.	Hundred Percent Free	60	3	2,708	¥2,924,640	
2011	tear drops: Released: February 23, 2011; Label: Giza Studio GZCA-7160; Used as the opening theme for episodes 602–612.	Caos Caos Caos	60	3	2,704	¥2,920,320	
2011	Tsukiyo no Itazaru no Mahou (月夜の悪戯の魔法, lit. "Mischievous Magic on the Moonlit Night") / Climber × Climber: Released: April 27, 2011; Label: Zain Records ZACL-4030; Used as the ending theme for episodes 610–629.	Breakerz	5	7	24,268	¥31,451,328	
2011	Don't Wanna Lie: Released: June 1, 2011; Label: Vermillion Records BMCV-5019; Used as the opening theme for episodes 613–626 and the fifteenth film Case Closed: Quarter of Silence.	B'z	1	10	216,239	¥233,538,120	
2011	Misty Mystery: Released: August 31, 2011; Label: Giza Studio GZCA-4135; Used as the opening theme for episodes 627–641.	Garnet Crow	9	5	15,439	¥20,008,944	
2011	Your Best Friend: Released: October 19, 2011; Label: Northern Music VNCM-6024 VNCM-6023 (Limited Edition); Used as the ending theme beginning episode 629.	Mai Kuraki	6	10	25,247	¥32,720,112	
2012	Miss Mystery: Released: January 25, 2012; Label: Zain Records ZACL-4036, ZACL-4034 (Limited Edition A), ZACL-4035 (Limited Edition B); Used as the opening theme from episodes 642–666.	Breakerz	5	6			
2012	Haru Uta (ハルウタ, lit. "Spring's Song"): Released: April 25, 2012; Label: Epic Records ESCL-3875; Used as the theme song for the sixteenth film Case Closed: The Eleventh Striker.	Ikimono-gakari	4	12	61,938	¥36,295,668	
2012	Ōbāraito / Nōnai Survivor (オーバーライト / 脳内Survivor, lit. "Overwrite/Survivor in the brain"): Released: June 13, 2012; Label: Zain Records ZACL-4039, ZACL-4037 (Limited Edition A), ZACL-4038 (Limited Edition B); Overwrite is used as the ending theme beginning episode 654–666.	Breakerz	5	4			
2012	Koi ni Koishite/Special Morning Day to You (恋に恋して / Special Morning Day to You, lit. "In Love With Love/Special Morning Day to You"): Released: August 15, 2012; Label: Northern Music VNCM-6028, VNCM-6027 (Limited Edition), VNCF-6028 (Musing/Fan Edition); Koi ni Koishite is used as the ending theme from episodes 667–686.	Mai Kuraki	7	8	21,970	¥23,727,600	
2012	Kimi no Namida ni Konna ni Koishiteru (君の涙にこんなに恋してる, lit. "So in Love in Tears"): Released: August 29, 2012; Label: D-GO GZCD-7001 (Detective Conan Edition), GZCD-7002 (Regular Edition); Used as the opening theme from episodes 667–680.	Natsuiro (なついろ, lit."Summer Color")	55	3			
2013	Try Again: Released: February 6, 2013; Label: Northern Music VNCM-6029 (Limited Edition), VNCM-6030 (Detective Conan Edition), VNCM-6031 (Regular Edition); Used as the opening theme beginning episode 681-695	Mai Kuraki	7	8	20,237	¥21,855,960	
2013	Hitomi no Melody (瞳のメロディ, lit. "Melody of Eyes"): Released: March 27, 2013; Label: Being Inc. JBCB-6008 (Limited Edition), JBCB-6009 (HMV Edition), JBCB-6010 (Regular Edition), JBCB-6011 (Detective Conan Edition); Used as the ending theme beginning episode 687-704	Boyfriend	4	4			
2013	One More Time (ワンモアタイム, Wan Moa Taimu): Released: April 17, 2013; Label: Victor Entertainment VICL-36820; Used as the theme song for the seventeenth film Case Closed: Private Eye in the Distant Sea.	Kazuyoshi Saito	9	6			
2013	Kimi no egao ga nani yori mo suki datta (君の笑顔がなによりも好きだった, lit. "I liked above all is your smile"): Released: August 28, 2013; Label: GIZA studio GZCA-7169 (Limited Edition), GZCA-7171 (Regular Edition), GZCA-7170 (Detective Conan Edition); Used as the ending theme beginning episode 705-721	Chicago Poodle	35	5			
2013	Butterfly Core: Released: November 27, 2013; Label: Being Inc. JBCZ-4006 (Limited Edition), JBCZ-4008 (Regular Edition), JBCZ-4007 (Detective Conan Edition), JBCF-1003 (Musing/Fan Edition); Used as the opening theme beginning episode 718-743	Valshe	23	9	12,045	¥18,067,500	
2013	BUTTERFLY/Ima aitakute... (BUTTERFLY/いま逢いたくて..., lit. "Butterfly/I miss you now..."): Released: December 4, 2013; Label: Zain Records ZACL−6029 (Limited Edition A), ZACL−6030 (Limited Edition B), ZACL−4044 (Regular Edition); Ima aitakute... is used as the ending theme beginning episode 722-736	DAIGO	7	3			
2014	Love Searchlight: Released: April 16, 2014; Label: NAYUTAWAVE RECORDS UPCH-89167 (Limited Edition), UPCH-80357 (Regular Edition); Used as the theme song for the eighteenth film Case Closed: Dimensional Sniper.	Shibasaki Kou	22	5	6,197	¥7,362,036	
2014	Greed: Released: August 20, 2014; Label: Being Inc. JBCZ-6008; Used as the opening theme beginning episode 744.	Knock Out Monkey	58	1			
2014	Invincible Heart/Stand by you (無敵なハート/STAND BY YOU, Muteki na heart/Stand by you): Released: August 27, 2014; Label: Northern Music VNCM-6036 (Limited Edition A), VNCM-6037 (Limited Edition B), VNCM-6038 (Regular Edition), VNCF-6038 (Musing/Fan Edition); Muteki na heart is used as the ending theme beginning episode 750.	Mai Kuraki	5	6	29,517	¥31,878,360	
2015	Kimi e no Uso: Released: February 4, 2015; Used as the ending theme beginning episode 763.	Valshe	14	4	9,070	¥13,605,000	
2015	We Go: Released: May 20, 2015; Used as the opening theme beginning episode 774.	Breakerz	9	4	12,317	¥13,302,360	
2017	Togetsukyou ~Kimi Omofu~: Released: April 12, 2017; Used as the theme song for the 21st film Detective Conan: The Crimson Love Letter.	Mai Kuraki	5	42	326,305	¥326,305,000	
Total single sales					6,962,590	¥7,871,050,052 ($96,313,563)	
"—" denotes releases that did not chart.

== Soundtracks ==
Year	Title	Charts		Ref.
Year	Title	Peak	Weeks	Ref.
1996	Detective Conan Original Soundtrack (Note: 名探偵コナン オリジナル・サウンドトラック, Meitantei Conan Orijinaru Saundotorakku): Released: February 21, 1996; Label: Polydor Records POCX-1017	50	2	
1996	Detective Conan Original Soundtrack 2 (Note: 名探偵コナン オリジナル・サウンドトラック 2, Meitantei Conan Orijinaru Saundotorakku 2): Released: May 5, 1996; Label: Polydor Records POCX-1027/8	69	1	
1996	Detective Conan Original Soundtrack 3 (Note: 名探偵コナン オリジナル・サウンドトラック 3, Meitantei Conan Orijinaru Saundotorakku 3): Released: May 5, 1996; Label: Polydor Records POCX-1055	—		
1997	Detective Conan: The Time Bombed Skyscraper Original Soundtrack (Note: 名探偵コナン 時計じかけの摩天楼 オリジナル・サウンドトラック, Meitantei Conan Tokei-jikake no Matenrō Orijinaru Saundotorakku): Released: April 23, 1997; Label: Polydor Records POCX-1072	—		
1998	Detective Conan: The Fourteenth Target Original Soundtrack (Note: 名探偵コナン 14番目の標的 オリジナル・サウンドトラック, Meitantei Conan Jūyon banme no Tagetto Orijinaru Saundotorakku): Released: April 15, 1998; Label: Polydor Records POCX-1096	—		
1999	Detective Conan: The Last Wizard of the Century Original Soundtrack (Note: 名探偵コナン 世紀末の魔術師 オリジナル・サウンドトラック, Meitantei Conan Seikimatsu no Majutsushi Orijinaru Saundotorakku): Released: April 14, 1999; Label: Polydor Records POCX-1117	—		
2000	Detective Conan: Captured in Her Eyes Original Soundtrack (Note: 名探偵コナン 瞳の中の暗殺者 オリジナル・サウンドトラック, Meitantei Conan Hitomi no Naka no Ansatsusha Orijinaru Saundotorakku): Released: April 12, 2000; Label: Polydor Records POCX-2006	—		
2001	Detective Conan: Countdown to Heaven Original Soundtrack (Note: 名探偵コナン 天国へのカウントダウン オリジナル・サウンドトラック, Meitantei Conan Tengoku e no Kauntodaun Orijinaru Saundotorakku): Released: April 11, 2001; Label: Polydor Records UPCH-1057	—		
2001	Detective Conan Original Soundtrack 4: Let's go Detective Boys! (Note: 名探偵コナン オリジナル・サウンドトラック 4 ～急げ！少年探偵団～, Meitantei Conan Orijinaru Saundotorakku 4 ～Isoge! Shōnen Tanteidan～): Released: April 25, 2001; Label: Polydor Records UPCH-1061	—		
2002	Detective Conan: The Phantom of Baker Street Original Soundtrack (Note: 名探偵コナン ベイカー街の亡霊 オリジナル・サウンドトラック, Meitantei Conan Beikā Sutorīto no Bōrei Orijinaru Saundotorakku): Released: April 17, 2002; Label: Polydor Records UPCH-1150	—		
2003	Detective Conan: Crossroad in the Ancient Capital Original Soundtrack (Note: 名探偵コナン 迷宮の十字路 オリジナル・サウンドトラック, Meitantei Conan Meikyū no Kurosurōdo Orijinaru Saundotorakku): Released: April 16, 2003; Label: Universal Music Group UPCH-1239	215	1	
2004	Detective Conan: Magician of the Silver Sky Original Soundtrack (Note: 名探偵コナン 銀翼の奇術師 オリジナル・サウンドトラック, Meitantei Conan Gin-yoku no Majishan Orijinaru Saundotorakku): Released: April 14, 2004; Label: Universal Music Group UPCH-1336	197	2	
2005	Detective Conan: Strategy Above the Depths Original Soundtrack (Note: 名探偵コナン 水平線上の陰謀 オリジナル・サウンドトラック, Meitantei Conan Suiheisenjō no Sutoratejī Orijinaru Saundotorakku): Released: April 6, 2005; Label: Universal Music Group UPCH-1397	292	1	
2006	Detective Conan: The Private Eyes' Requiem Original Soundtrack (Note: 名探偵コナン 探偵たちの鎮魂歌 オリジナル・サウンドトラック, Meitantei Conan Tantei-tachi no Requiem Orijinaru Saundotorakku): Released: April 12, 2006; Label: Universal Music Group UPCH-1485	292	1	
2007	Detective Conan: Jolly Roger in the Deep Azure Original Soundtrack (Note: 名探偵コナン 紺碧の棺 オリジナル・サウンドトラック, Meitantei Conan Konpeki no Jorī Rojā Orijinaru Saundotorakku): Released: April 18, 2007; Label: B-Gram Records JBCJ-9022	—		
2008	Detective Conan: Full Score of Fear Original Soundtrack (Note: 名探偵コナン 戦慄の楽譜 オリジナル・サウンドトラック, Meitantei Conan Senritsu no Furu Sukoa Orijinaru Saundotorakku): Released: April 16, 2008; Label: B-Gram Records JBCJ-9029	208	1	
2009	Detective Conan: The Raven Chaser Original Soundtrack (Note: 名探偵コナン 漆黒の追跡者 オリジナル・サウンドトラック, Meitantei Conan Shikkoku no Chaser Orijinaru Saundotorakku): Released: April 15, 2009; Label: B-Gram Records JBCJ-9033	212	1	
2010	Detective Conan: The Lost Ship in the Sky Original Soundtrack (Note: 名探偵コナン 天空の難破船 オリジナル・サウンドトラック, Meitantei Conan Tenkuu no Rosuto Shippu Orijinaru Saundotorakku): Released: April 14, 2010; Label: B-Gram Records JBCJ-9034	237	1	
2011	Detective Conan: Quarter of Silence Original Soundtrack (Note: 名探偵コナン 沈黙の15分 オリジナル・サウンドトラック, Meitantei Conan Chinmoku no Kwōtā Orijinaru Saundotorakku): Released: April 13, 2011; Label: B-Gram Records JBCJ-9039	—		
2012	Detective Conan: The Eleventh Striker Original Soundtrack (Note: 名探偵コナン 11人目のストライカー・サウンドトラック, Meitantei Conan Jūichi-ninme no Sutoraikā Orijinaru Saundotorakku): Released: April 11, 2012; Label: B-Gram Records JBCJ-9047	267	1	
2013	Detective Conan: Private Eye in the Distant Sea Original Soundtrack (Note: 名探偵コナン 「絶海の探偵」 オリジナル・サウンドトラック, Meitantei Conan: Zekkai no Private Eye Orijinaru Saundotorakku): Released: April 17, 2013; Label: Being Inc. JBCJ-9049	227	1	
2013	Lupin the 3rd vs. Detective Conan: The Movie Original Soundtrack (Note: ルパン三世VS名探偵コナン The Movie オリジナル・サウンドトラック, Rupan Sansei Vāsasu Meitantei Konan The Movie Orijinaru Saundotorakku): Released: December 4, 2013; Label: VAP VPCG-84961			
"—" denotes releases that did not chart.

== Image albums ==
Year	Title	Charts		Ref.
Year	Title	Peak	Weeks	Ref.
1997	"Boku ga Iru" TV anime Meitantei Conan Imeeji Songu Arubamu (ぼくがいる〜TVアニメ｢名探偵コナン｣イメージソングアルバム, lit. "I am Here" TV anime Detective Conan Image Song Album): Released: October 22, 1997; Label: Polydor Records POCX-1081	—		
2006	Meitantei Conan・ Kyarakutaa・ Songu Shuu Mikado ni Shoogakko ni zenin shuugoo!! (名探偵コナン・キャラクター・ソング集 帝丹小学校に全員集合!!, lit. Detective Conan All Character Best Songs in School): Released: January 25, 2006; Label: Universal Music Group UPCH-1454	196	1	
"—" denotes releases that did not chart.

== Notes and references ==
Notes
