= D-project =

Japanese cover band

d-project
- Origin: Japan
- Genres: Rock, pop
- Years active: 2016
- Labels: Giza Studio
- Website: Official Website

d-project is a Japanese cover band under the Giza Studio label. The band was formed to celebrate 25th anniversary of Zard's debut and in first album arranged popular songs. Famous arrangers and composed were grouped with guest vocalist Maki Ohguro and guest mc Ken. The first album d-project with ZARD was released on 30 May 2016. The album reached #33 rank first week and charted for 3 weeks.

== Discography ==
=== d-project with ZARD ===
All songs are originally written by Izumi Sakai. Compositions for each song by individual composers remains same.

#	Kanji	Romaji
1.	愛は暗闇の中で 編曲：麻井寛史 (Sensation)	Ai wa Kurayami no Naka de Arranger: Hiroshi Asai (Sensation)
2.	負けないで 編曲：徳永暁人 (doa)	Makenaide; Arranger: Akihito Tokunaga (doa)
3.	きっと忘れない 編曲：大賀好修 (Sensation)	Kitto Wasurenai; Arranger: Yoshinobu Ohga (Sensation)
4.	君がいない 編曲：鶴澤夢人 (Sensation)	Kimi ga Inai; Arranger: Yumemoto Tsuresawa
5.	揺れる想い 編曲：岡本仁志 (ex. Garnet Crow)	Yureru Omoi; Arranger: Hitoshi Okamoto (ex.Garnet Crow)
6.	雨に濡れて 編曲：山口 篤, 鶴澤夢人	Ame ni Yurete; Arranger: Atsushi Yamaguchi (ex.Naifu) and Tsuresawa
7.	愛が見えない 編曲：森丘直樹	Ai ga Mienai; Arranger: Naoki Morioka (dps)
8.	こんなにそばに居るのに 編曲：GAK (purple stone)	Konna ni Soba ni Iru no ni Arranger: GAK (purple stone)
9.	DAN DAN 心魅かれてく 編曲：徳永暁人 (doa)	Dan Dan Kokoro Hikareteku; Arranger：Tokunaga (doa)
10.	もう少し あと少し... 編曲：安部智樹 (Hachi)	Mou Sukoshi, Ato Sukoshi... Arranger：Tomoki Abe (Hachi)
11.	Don't You See! 編曲：大楠雄蔵 (Sensation)	Don't You See! Arranger：U-zo Ohkusu (Sensation)
12.	Get U're Dream 編曲：灰原大介	Get U're Dream; Arranger：Daisuke Haibara
13.	星のかがやきよ 編曲：宮崎 諒	Hoshi no Kagayaki yo Arranger：Ryo Miyazaki
14.	かけがえのないもの 編曲：竹田 NINJA 京右	Kakegae no Nai Mono; Arranger：Kyosuke NINJA Takeda
