= Sard Underground =

Japanese rock band

- Also known as: Sard
- Origin: Japan
- Genres: J-pop
- Years active: 2018–present
- Label: Giza Studio (2019–)
- Members: Yua Shinno
- Past members: Miyuu Akasaka; Izumi Sugioka; Hiromi Sakamoto
- Website: Official Website

YouTube information
- Channel: SARD UNDERGROUND OFFICIAL
- Years active: 2019 -
- Subscribers: 144 thousand
- Views: 66 million
- Last updated: August 6, 2024

Sard Underground (stylized in all caps) is a solo project of Yua Shinno produced by Daiko Nagato. In September 2019, Sard Underground debuted as a musical group with their cover album Zard Tribute under the Giza Studio label. As a solo project of the Japanese artist Zard, the name is derived from Zard.

== History ==
=== Musical group period 2019-2024 ===
The band formation has started in the December 2018 by introducing only Yua herself with the social network accounts creation.

In February 2019, the band has announced 4 stable members and soon held first one-man live in the live venue Hills Pankojo Factory in Osaka. In June, two cover songs has received a promotion: My Friend was promoted as an image song to the marathon event Tohoku Miyagi Revive and Makenaide as a theme song to the High School Basketball Winter Cup. Both of the songs were included in the cover album Zard Tribute, which released on 18 September. The album debuted at number 24 on the Oricon Album Weekly Charts and charted 10 weeks. In November 2019, they appeared in the music event DFT presents Ototo ONTO vol.6.

On February 10, 2020, the twenty-ninth anniversary of Zard's first single "Good-bye My Loneliness", the band released their debut single "Sukoshi Zutsu Sukoshi Zutsu." It is an unreleased song written by Zard vocalist Izumi Sakai and composed by frequent Zard collaborator Aika Ohno. The single was used as an ending theme to the anime television series Detective Conan, which featured many Zard songs from 1999 to 2008. A cover of Zard's first single and its B side "Ai wa Kurayami no Naka de" were also included on the regular and Detective Conan editions of the single, respectively. On June 3, 2020, the band released their second single "Korekara no Kimi ni Kampai," another unreleased song written by Sakai. It was composed by another frequest Zard collaborator, Daria Kawashima. The song was featured as the theme song of MBS's music television program +music. The single also included two new covers of Zard songs.

On 28 April 2021, they've released their first video-album "SARD UNDERGROUND LIVE TOUR 2020", which includes footage of live held on the previous year. On May 26, 2021, via Sard Underground's office site it was announced that guitarist Asaka Miyuu had departed Sard Underground and her exclusive contract had been cancelled. After a doctor's diagnosis it was decided it would be difficult for her to continue her activities as a member of the band and she withdrew. The departure of Miyuu also pushed back the release of the original album "Natsu no Owari ni..." (At the end of summer...) to an undetermined future date, originally slated for July to release. Later, rename of the album was announced to the Orange Iro ni Kanpai and release was postponed two months later, in September 2021. For the upcoming live concerts, Yuuichiro Iwai (ex. U-ka Saegusa in dB) take the role of the supportive guitarist.

Their fourth single, "Karappo no Kokoro", released in 2022, became their first single which debut at top 10 on the Oricon Weekly Charts.

In October 2023, Sard made guest appearance at the Japan's Anime Song Festival held at Melaka, Malaysia. It became their first oversea stage appearance since their debut.

In 2024, the band celebrated its 5th debut anniversary. On 24 March was released their first compilation album Zard Tribute Best Selection. The album will include newly recorded covers and re-record of the previously covered songs. On the same day, they've announced their first nationwide live tour. On final live tour day, 22 September it was announced that Sugioka and Sakamoto are leaving the band at the end of the month, having Shinno alone continuing her activities as the solo project.

=== Solo project period 2025-present ===
In January 2025, Shinno released her first solo single I still believe written by Aika Ohno and co-written by Shinno herself. Following the day after the release, it was announced that the song will serve as ending song for the television program Yoru no Brunch broadcast by TBS. Since February until present, the official YouTube channel uploads series of live covers under subtitle "First Studio Live". On 15 March 2025, the fifth cover YouTube video includes previously unreleased song "Anata, Cattleya". Day before the upload, the title was named as a "secret track". On 19 March 2025, is scheduled to release Blu-ray home video of the final live concert as a music group from their 2024 live tour Tear Drops. From June 2025 until September 2025 is scheduled for Shinno to held her first solo live tour concert.

== Members ==
- Yua Shinno (神野 友亜) - lead vocals, lyrics

=== Past member ===
- Izumi Sugioka (杉岡 泉美) - bass, backing vocals (2019–2024)
- Hiromi Sakamoto (坂本 ひろ美) - keyboards, backing vocals (2019–2024)
- Miyuu Akasaka (赤坂 美羽) - guitars, backing vocals (2019–2021)

== Discography ==
=== Albums ===
==== Studio albums ====
#	Release date	Title	CD Code	Chart	Formats
1st	2019/09/18	Zard Tribute	GZCA-5295	24	CD, download, streaming
2nd	2020/10/07	Zard Tribute II	GZCA-5300/GZCA-5299	16	CD, download, streaming
3rd	2021/09/01	Orenji Iro ni Kanpai (オレンジ色に乾杯)	GZCA-5308/GZCA-5307/GZCA-5306	12	CD, download, streaming
4th	2022/02/09	Zard Tribute III	GZCA-5310/GZCA-5309	14	CD, download, streaming
5th	2022/09/14	Hi no Nagori (日の名残り)	GZCA-5312/GZCA-5313	9	CD, download, streaming
6th	2024/08/21	Namida Iro De (涙色で)	GZCA-5324/GZCA-5325	11	CD, download, streaming
7th	2025/09/17	Koshō Shita Kuruma (故障した車)	GZCA-5327	13	CD, download, streaming

==== Compilation albums ====
#	Release date	Title	CD Code	Chart	Formats
1st	2024/03/20	Zard Tribute Best Selection	GZCA-5323; GZCA-5322	13	CD, CD+Blu-ray+Calendar

=== Singles ===
	Release date	Title	Charts	Formats
1st	2020/02/10	"Sukoshi Zutsu Sukoshi Zutsu" (少しづつ 少しづつ)	15	CD, download, streaming
2nd	2020/06/3	"Korekara no Kimi ni Kampai" (これからの君に乾杯)	6	CD, download, streaming
3rd	2021/02/10	"Black Coffee" (ブラックコーヒー)	11	CD, download, streaming
4th	2022/05/18	"Karappo no Kokoro" (空っぽの心)	6	CD, download
5th	2023/02/22	"Sotsugyoushiki" (卒業式)	13	CD, download, streaming
6th	2023/09/20	"Yakushainu no Uta" (役者犬のうた)	9	CD, download, streaming
7th	2024/08/21	"Yume de Aimashou" (夢で逢いましょう)	11	CD, download
8th	2025/02/04	"I still believe"		download

== Videography ==
=== Live-video albums ===
	Release date	Title	CD Code	Chart	Formats
1st	2021/04/28	SARD UNDERGROUND LIVE TOUR 2020	GZXA-8038	20	Blu-ray
2nd	2022/03/16	SARD UNDERGROUND LIVE TOUR 2021[Cheers!]	GZXA-8039	17	Blu-ray
3rd	2024/12/18	Film Collection 2019 - 2024 Music & History	GZXA-8043～44	TBA	Blu-ray
4th	2025/03/19	SARD UNDERGROUND LIVE TOUR 2024 [tear drops]	GZXA-8045～44	TBA	Blu-ray

== Tours ==
=== As a musical group ===
- Sard Underground Live Tour 2020 (2020)
- Sard Underground Live Tour 2021 Cheers! (2021)
- Sard Underground Live Tour 2022 In the twilight (2022)
- Sard Underground Live Tour 2023 Hold me, my friend (2023)
- Sard Underground Live Tour 2024 - Tear drops (2024)

=== As a solo project ===
- Sard Underground Live Tour 2025
