= Good-bye My Loneliness =

Good-bye My Loneliness may refer to:

- Good-bye My Loneliness (album), the album
- "Good-bye My Loneliness" (song), the song
