= Mō Sagasanai =

1991 single by Zard

Single by Zard

from the album Mō Sagasanai
- Released: November 6, 1991
- Genre: Pop rock
- Label: B-Gram Records
- Songwriters: Izumi Sakai, Tetsurō Oda
- Producer: Daiko Nagato

Zard singles chronology
"Fushigi ne..." (1991)	"Mō Sagasanai" (1991)	"Nemurenai Yoru wo Daite" (1992)

"Mō Sagasanai (もう探さない)" is the 3rd single by Zard and released 6 November 1991 under B-Gram Records label. The single debuted at #39 rank first week. It charted for 9 weeks and sold over 37,000 copies.

== Track list ==
All songs are written by Izumi Sakai and arranged by Masao Akashi

1. Mō Sagasanai (もう探さない)
  - composer: Tetsurō Oda
2. Konnani Aishitemo (こんなに愛しても)
  - composer: Seiichiro Kuribayashi
3. Mou Sagasanai (もう探さない) (original karaoke)
4. Konnani Aishitemo (こんなに愛しても) (original karaoke)
