= Golden Best =

Golden Best may refer to:

- Golden Best: 15th Anniversary, an album by Zard

Golden Best (sometimes stylized as GOLDEN☆BEST), common name for Japanese artist compilations.

- Golden Best (Mari Hamada album)
- Golden Best (Yōsui Inoue album)
- Golden Best (Pink Lady album)
