= Kanashii Hodo Anata ga Suki/Karatto Ikō! =

Single by Zard

from the album Brezza di mare: Dedicated to Izumi Sakai (#1)
- Released: March 8, 2006
- Genre: Pop rock
- Label: B-Gram Records
- Songwriters: Izumi Sakai, Aika Ohno (both songs)

Zard singles chronology
"'Hoshi no Kagayaki yo/Natsu wo Matsu Sail no Yō ni'" (2005)	"Kanashii Hodo Anata ga Suki/Karatto Ikō!" (2006)	"'Heart ni Hi wo Tsukete'" (2006)

"Kanashii Hodo Anata ga Suki/Karatto Ikō! (悲しいほど貴方が好き/カラッといこう!)" is the 41st single by Zard and released 8 March 2006 under B-Gram Records label. Kanashii Hodo Anata ga Suki wasn't included in their final studio album Kimi to no Distance, however it got released in their compilation album Brezza di mare: Dedicated to Izumi Sakai. Karatto Ikō! was released only in their compilation album Zard Single Collection in 2012.

The single reached #6 rank first week. It charted for 14 weeks and sold over 32,000 copies.

== Track list ==
All songs are written by Izumi Sakai, composed by Aika Ohno and arranged by Takeshi Hayama

1. Kanashii Hodo Anata ga Suki (悲しいほど貴方が好き)
  - Shiori Takei participated in chorus
    - the song was used as 24th ending theme for anime Detective Conan for its 10th anniversary of broadcasting.
2. Karatto Ikō! (カラッといこう!)
  - the song was used in Fuji TV program Mezamashi Doyoubi as theme song (from January till March 2006)
3. Kanashii Hodo Anata ga Suki (悲しいほど貴方が好き) (original karaoke)
4. Karatto Ikō! (カラッといこう!) (original karaoke)
