= Case Closed: The Fourteenth Target =

- Theatrical release poster
- Kanji: 名探偵コナン 14番目の標的(ターゲット)
- Revised Hepburn: Meitantei Konan: Jūyonbanme no Tāgetto
- Directed by: Kenji Kodama
- Written by: Kazunari Kouchi
- Based on: Case Closed by Gosho Aoyama
- Produced by: Masahito Yoshioka; Michihiko Suwa
- Starring: Minami Takayama; Kappei Yamaguchi; Akira Kamiya; Wakana Yamazaki; Gara Takashima; Chafurin; Kenichi Ogata; Kenji Utsumi; Ryuusei Nakao; Hirotaka Suzuoki; Maya Okamoto; Takashi Taniguchi
- Cinematography: Takashi Nomura
- Edited by: Terumitsu Okada
- Music by: Katsuo Ono
- Production company: TMS-Kyokuichi
- Distributed by: Toho
- Release date: April 18, 1998
- Running time: 99 minutes
- Country: Japan
- Language: Japanese
- Box office: ¥1.85 billion

Case Closed: the Fourteenth Target, known as Detective Conan: The Fourteenth Target (名探偵コナン 14番目の標的(ターゲット), Meitantei Konan: Jūyonbanme no Tāgetto) in Japan, is a 1998 Japanese animated mystery film and the second feature film based on the Case Closed series. It was released in Japanese theatres on April 18, 1998. The English version was released on DVD on November 20, 2007, by Funimation. The film grossed ¥1.85 billion in Japan.

== Plot ==
Rachel Moore has recurring nightmares about Eva Kaden, her mother and Richard's wife, being shot, which connects to a past incident where Eva was accidentally wounded by Richard during a police standoff involving him and a criminal named Jake Morono.

While Rachel struggles with the truth, Richard and Conan Edogawa become involved in a string of attacks start with Joseph Meguire, Eva and Dr. Agasa and linked to playing cards left at crime scenes. The case intensifies when friends and acquaintances of Richard — including golfer Henry Tish, sommelier Kevin Simms, and businessman Christopher Aston — are targeted. At the AquaCrystal complex of Tokyo Bay, several murders occur, each tied to the spade suit. Suspicion initially falls on Morono, but Conan deduces the real killer is Kevin, who faked being a victim. Kevin's motive stems from losing his sense of taste after an accident caused by Nina Oliver and his resentment toward others in his circle.

Using bombs and staged traps, he attempts to eliminate his targets and escape, but his plan collapses after Conan shoots Rachel with Nicholas Santos' gun, just before Richard manages to subdue him, ensuring he faces justice. Conan, Richard, Meguire, Nicholas and Rachel manage to escape via helicopter while the remaining surviving victims rescued by Japan Coast Guard as the AquaCrystal collapses into the bottom of the sea. In the aftermath, Rachel reconciles with Richard, realizing his actions years earlier were to protect her mother, while Kevin is arrested for his various crimes.

In the post-credits scene at Eva's apartment, it is revealed that she left Richard not over the hostage incident, but because of his harsh criticism of her cooking.

=== Playing card symbols ===
During the course of the film multiple characters are represented by a certain number from a standard deck of cards. The playing cards are all spades, which represents death. The victim's name, clue left behind, and the connection with the number are all displayed below in the chart. Since the English adaptation has changed names of the characters, the corresponding relationships between the character and the numbers were changed accordingly.

Card number or name	Victim's name (English version)	Connection to the number (English version)	Victim's name (Japanese version)	Connection to the number (Japanese version)	Clue left behind
Joker	Jake Morono	His nickname in the casino is "joker".	Jyou Murakami (村上 丈, Murakami Jyō)	Same as in English.	
Number 13/King Of Spades	Joseph Meguire	His name has 13 letters.	Juzo Megure (目暮 十三, Megure Jūzō)	First name is "thirteen".	The King's Knife/Dagger
Number 12/The Queen of Spades	Eva Kaden	Her first name means "Queen" in other languages.	Eri Kisaki (妃 英理, Kisaki Eri)	妃 means "Queen" in Japanese.	The Queen's Flower
Number 11/Jack of Spades	Hiroshi Agasa	He has 11 patents on inventions.	Hiroshi Agasa (阿笠 博士, Agasa Hiroshi)	士 is a combination of the kanji of ten (十) and one (一).	The Jack's Royal Sceptre
False Number 10	Tammy Diez	Her last name is the number ten in Spanish.	Towako Okano (岡野 十和子, Okano Towako)	Her name contains the kanji for 10 (十).	No clue exists
Number 10	Henry Tish	He is currently ranked as the 10th best Golfer in the world.	Hiroki Tsuji (辻 弘樹, Tsuji Hiroki)	辻 contains the kanji for 10 (十).	The ten of spades in a normal set of playing cards
Number 9	Chris Ashton	His holdings include nine important buildings in the city.	Katsuyoshi Asahi (旭 勝義, Asahi Katsuyoshi)	旭 contains the kanji for "nine" (九).	The nine of spades in a normal set of playing cards
Number 8	Kevin Simms	Attended a culinary school with an eight-year program.	Kouhei Sawaki (沢木 公平, Sawaki Kōhei)	公 contains the kanji for eight (八).	The eight of spades in a normal set of playing cards
Number 7	Nina Oliver	Has modeled since she was seven.	Nana Osanai (小山内 奈々, Osanai Nana)	Nana is a Japanese reading of seven.	The seven of spades in a normal set of playing cards
Number 6	Emilio Cantore	He has six children.	Eimei Shishido (宍戸 永明, Shishido Eimei)	宍 contains the kanji of "six" (六).	The six of spades in a normal set of playing cards
Number 5	Richard Moore	His last name has five letters.	Kogoro Mouri (毛利 小五郎, Mōri Kogorō)	小五郎 contains the kanji for "five" (五).	The five of spades in a normal set of playing cards
Number 4	Peter Ford	His last name has four letters.	Peter Ford (ピーター・フォード, Bītā Fōdo)	Last name has phonetic similarity to "four."	The four of spades in a normal set of playing cards
Number 3	Nicholas Santos	He is the third child of three siblings, each of which were born three years apart.	Ninzaburou Shiratori (白鳥 任三郎, Shiratori Ninzaburō)	任三郎 contains the kanji for "three" (三).	The three of spades in a normal set of playing cards
Number 2	Mason Norfolk	Wrote two books.	Minoru Nishina (仁科 稔, Nishina Minoru)	仁 contains the kanji for "two" (二).	The two of spades in a normal set of playing cards
Number 1/Ace of spades	Jimmy Kudo	He is the number one detective, Also number one in other things.	Shinichi Kudo (工藤 新一, Kudō Shin'ichi)	新一 contains the kanji for "one" (一).	The ace of spades in a normal set of playing cards

== Cast ==
Character	Japanese	English
Conan Edogawa	Minami Takayama	Alison Retzloff
Shinichi Kudo/Jimmy Kudo	Kappei Yamaguchi	Jerry Jewell
Mitsuhiko Tsuburaya/Mitch Tennyson	Ikue Ohtani	Cynthia Cranz
Kogoro Mouri/Richard Moore	Akira Kamiya	R. Bruce Elliott
Ran Mouri/Rachel Moore	Wakana Yamazaki	Colleen Clinkenbeard
Genta Kojima/George Kaminski	Wataru Takagi	Mike McFarland
Ayumi Yoshida/Amy Yeager	Yukiko Iwai	Monica Rial
Sonoko Suzuki/Serena Sebastian	Naoko Matsui	Laura Bailey
Juzo Megure/Joseph Meguire	Chafurin	Mark Stoddard
Dr. Hiroshi Agasa	Kenichi Ogata	Bill Flynn
Ninzaburou Shiratori/Nicholas Santos	Kaneto Shiozawa	Eric Vale
Towako Okano/Tammy Diez	Miyuki Ichijo	Carrie Savage
Eimei Shishido/Emilio Cantore	Kenji Utsumi	Christopher R. Sabat
Kohei Sawaki/Kevin Simms	Ryuusei Nakao	Chuck Huber
Minoru Nishina/Mason Norfolk	Hirotaka Suzuoki	Jason Liebrecht
Peter Ford	Andy Holyfield	John Swasey
Eri Kisaki/Eva Kaden	Gara Takashima	Julie Mayfield
Nana Osanai/Nina Oliver	Maya Okamoto	Luci Christian
Hiroki Tsuji/Henry Tish	Takashi Taniguchi	Troy Baker
Jo Murakami/Jake Marano	Eiichiro Suzuki	Troy Baker

== Production ==
=== Inspiration ===
The story of the film is a combination of two Agatha Christie mystery novels. The A.B.C. Murders is an Hercule Poirot mystery where the murderer seems to be picking victims based on the alphabet, just as people are being targeted in this film based on numbers in their names. It contains the same revelations that the murderer is only establishing a pattern to confuse detectives, and is willing to kill victims unrelated to his true motives in order to maintain the ruse. The other novel is And Then There Were None, where various people are invited to a secluded island and killed one by one, with the murderer actually being one of the party. In a nod and possible clue to viewers, Conan mentions a type of wine that Poirot drank in Death on the Nile.

=== Theme Song ===
"Shōjo no Koro ni Modotta Mitai ni" (少女の頃に戻ったみたいに, lit. "Like I was a young girl")

Lyrics by: Izumi Sakai / Music by: Aika Ohno / Arranged by: Daisuke Ikeda / Performed by: Zard

=== Soundtrack ===
Masayoshi Takanaka (lead guitar), Ken Yoshida (bass), and Nobu Saito (percussion) are in charge of the performance of "Detective Conan Main Theme (Target Version)". In addition, T-SQUARE's Takeshi Ito ("Conan passes", "Aqua Crystal", "Into Aqua Crystal", "Frustration"), Casiopea's Tetsuo Sakurai ("Aqua Crystal", "Into Aqua Crystal"), George Yanagi ("KIZUNA (vocal version)") is participating.

== Box office ==
At the Japanese box office, the film earned a distributors' income (rentals) of ¥1.05 billion, and a total box office gross of ¥1.85 billion.

== Home media ==
=== VHS ===
The VHS of the film was released on April 14, 2002. It was discontinued soon after 2006 as it was switched to DVD.

=== Region 2 DVD ===
The DVD of the film was released on March 28, 2002. A new DVD was released on February 25, 2011, significantly lowering the original price and added the trailer as a special feature.

=== Region 1 DVD ===
Funimation's English dub of The Fourteenth Target was released on November 20, 2007. Due to the Americanization of the majority of the character's names, most of the explanations for names have been changed. The ending of this film as well was changed to an endless loop of police cars with their lights from the final scene with the credits displayed over it.

=== Blu-ray ===
The Blu-ray version of the film was released on June 24, 2011. The Blu-ray contains the same content of the DVD plus a mini-booklet explaining the film and the BD-live function.

== Reception ==
Anime News Network's Carlo Santos gave a mixed review of the film, saying that while it makes for "a good action-suspense movie with a clever mystery setup", he found fault in the dub transition of the story and ended saying: "In short, it's one of those movies that just happens to be a really long TV episode."
