= Mō Sagasanai (album) =

Studio album by Zard
- Released: December 25, 1991
- Genre: Rock; pop rock; soft rock
- Length: 31:29
- Label: B-Gram
- Producer: Daiko Nagato

Zard chronology
Good-bye My Loneliness (1991)	Mō Sagasanai (1991)	Hold Me (1992)

Singles from Mō Sagasanai
- 1. "Fushigi ne..." Released: 25 June 1991; 2. "Mō Sagasanai" Released: 6 November 1991

Mō Sagasanai (もう探さない, I Won't Search Anymore) is the second studio album of Japanese band Zard. It was released on December 25, 1991, released under B-Gram label. In 1991, B-Gram released this album in cassette tape and CD format. In 1993, B-Gram Records re-released this album only in CD format (BGCH-1004).

== Background ==
The album consists of two previously released singles.

"Sunao ni Ienakute" and "Itsuka wa" are both composed by singer/frontman Izumi Sakai.

In 2009, the song Sunao ni Ienakute was re-arranged and released as single; the song was re-arranged by Hitoshi Okamoto, a member of Garnet Crow. Mai Kuraki joined in on the chorus.

== Chart performance ==
The album reached #36 rank first week. It charted for 57 weeks and sold 333,000 copies.

== Track listing ==
All lyrics are written by Izumi Sakai.

No.	Title	Music	Length
1.	"Fushigi ne..." (不思議ね…)	Tetsurou Oda	4:16
2.	"Mō Sagasanai" (もう探さない)	Oda	5:05
3.	"Sunao ni Ienakute" (素直に言えなくて)	Izumi Sakai	4:17
4.	"Hitori ga Suki" (ひとりが好き)	Seiichiro Kuribayashi	4:49
5.	"Forever"	Daria Kawashima	4:18
6.	"Lonely Soldier Boy"	Kuribayashi	4:08
7.	"Itsuka wa..." (いつかは…)	Sakai	4:35

== In media ==
- Mō Sagasanai: theme song for TV Asahi Japanese television drama "Shichinin no Onna Bengoushi"
- Fushigi ne...: ending theme for Nihon TV program "Magical Zunou Power!"
