= Kimi to no Distance =

Studio album by Zard
- Released: September 7, 2005
- Studio: Birdman West; Giza Hills; Red Way; Blue Way; Green Way; Gardenia; Studio Birdman; Bruce Witkin Studio
- Genre: Pop; soft rock; R&B
- Length: 59:07
- Label: B-Gram
- Producer: Izumi Sakai

Zard chronology
Tomatteita Tokei ga Ima Ugokidashita (2004)	Kimi to no Distance (2005)

Singles from Kimi to no Distance
- 1. "Kakegae no Nai Mono" Released: 23 June 2004; 2. "Kyō wa Yukkuri Hanasō" Released: 24 November 2004; 3. "Hoshi no Kagayaki yo/Natsu wo Matsu Sail no Yō ni" Released: 20 April 2005

Kimi to no Distance (君とのディスタンス, The Distance With You) is the Zard 11th and final studio album, released on September 7, 2005 under B-Gram Records label. The album consist theme songs used for anime television series Detective Conan. Although Sakai released singles in 2006, this was Izumi Sakai's last album before her death in 2007.

== Background ==
Originally a candidate for the album title was to ”Sayonara Made no Distance”, for Izumi it was too negative and changed it later into Kimi to no Distance. In the early productions of the album, Kimi to no Furueai was possible candidate for the movie theme of Conan, however it was later replaced with Natsu wo Matsu Sail no You ni and original song became the part of the album recordings.

Eight out of thirteen songs were composed by Aika Ohno, the main music collaborator since 2000. The music composers from her first half of 90's times as Oda Tetsuro (as a self-cover) and Seiichiro Kuribayashi provided each of them one song for the first time in few years and Akihito Tokunaga, music collaborator in the second half of 90's.

I can't tell was recorded in 2003 and planned to be recorded in the previous studio album with the arrangement by Satoru Kobayashi, however the plans changed and in the charge of new arrangement was Takeshi Hayama.

The album includes Sakai's self cover of her provided lyric song, Last Good-bye which was originally performed by Field of View and was released as a single in 1995 and Anata to Tomoni Ikiteyuku, originally performed by Taiwanese singer Teresa Teng and was released as a single in 1993. It's Sakai's self cover from the band for first time in 10 years and general cover for first time in four years.

== Promotion ==
=== Singles ===
Kakegae no Nai Mono is the 38th single released on 23 June 2004. In the television, it was promoted as a theme song for the TBS television program "Koisuru Hamikami!". The single debuted at number 4 on Oricon Weekly Single Charts and sold over 46,000 copies.

Kyō wa Yukkuri Hanasō is the 39th single released on 24 November 2004. In the television, it was broadcast as a commercial song for Gekkeikan's sake Tsuki. The single debuted at number 5 on Oricon Single Weekly charts and sold over 33,000 copies.

Hoshi no Kagayaki yo is the A-side of 40th single, released on 20 April 2005. In the television, it was promoted as an opening theme for Anime television series Detective Conan. Making it her second opening theme for the same anime series for the first time in six years. The single debuted at number 2 on Oricon Weekly Single Charts and sold over 76,000 copies, making it double sales than her previous single.

Natsu wo Matsu Sail no Yō ni is the B-side of the 40th single. It was promoted in the theatre as a theme song for Detective Conan 9th movie Strategy Above the Depths, making it her second movie theme song for the anime movie series for the first time in seven years. It's also Izumi's single for first time in 10 years to include in the song's title of A side and B side.

== Chart performance ==
The album debuted at number 3 on Oricon Weekly Album Charts. It charted for 18 weeks and sold more than 148,000 copies.

The album has been rewarded with Golden Disc by RIAJ.

== Track listing ==
All lyrics are written by Izumi Sakai.

No.	Title	Music	Arrangers	Length
1.	"Natsu wo Matsu Sail no You ni" (夏を待つセイル(帆)のように)	Aika Ohno	Takeshi Hayama	4:33
2.	"Sayonara Made no Distance" (サヨナラまでのディスタンス)	Aika Ohno	Takeshi Hayama	4:44
3.	"Kakegae no Nai Mono" (かけがえのないもの)	Aika Ohno	Satoru Kobayashi	4:15
4.	"Kyō wa Yukkuri Hanasō" (今日はゆっくり話そう)	Aika Ohno	Akihito Tokunaga	4:50
5.	"Kimi to no Fureai" (君とのふれあい)	Aika Ohno	Takeshi Hayama	4:27
6.	"Separate Ways" (セパレート・ウェイズ)	Aika Ohno	Hirohito Furui (Garnet Crow))	4:16
7.	"Last Good-bye"	Yoshio Tatano	Takeshi Hayama	4:27
8.	"Hoshi no Kagayaki yo" (星のかがやきよ)	Aika Ohno	Takeshi Hayama	3:52
9.	"Tsuki ni Negai wo" (月に願いを)	Aika Ohno	Satoru Kobayashi	4:19
10.	"Anata to Tomo ni Ikite Yuku" (あなたと共に生きてゆく)	Tetsurō Oda	Satoru Kobayashi	4:58
11.	"I Can't Tell"	Seiichiro Kuribayashi	Takeshi Hayama	4:32
12.	"Good-night Sweetheart"	Akihito Tokunaga	Takeshi Hayama	4:47
13.	"Kimi to Kyou no Koto o Isshō Wasurenai" (君と今日の事を一生忘れない)	Akihito Tokunaga	Akihito Tokunaga	5:08

== Covers ==
Composer from the Giza Studio, Aika Ohno covered Natsu wo Matsu Sail no You ni and Kakegae no Nai Mono in her album Silent Passage in 2013.
