= Heart ni Hi wo Tsukete =

Single by Zard

from the album Golden Best: 15th Anniversary
- Released: May 10, 2006
- Genre: Pop rock
- Label: B-Gram Records
- Songwriters: Izumi Sakai, Aika Ohno

Zard singles chronology
"'Kanashii Hodo Anata ga Suki/Karatto Ikō!'" (2006)	"Heart ni Hi wo Tsukete" (2006)	"'Glorious Mind'" (2007)

"Heart ni Hi wo Tsukete" (ハートに火をつけて) is the 42nd single by Zard, released on 10 May 2006 by the B-Gram Records label. This single is not included in any studio album, but was released on their compilation album, Golden Best: 15th Anniversary, in 2006.

The single reached #10 in the charts in its first week. It stayed in the charts for nine weeks and sold over 24,000 copies.

This was the last single released by Izumi Sakai before her death.

== Track listing ==
All songs were written by Izumi Sakai and arranged by Takeshi Hayama

1. Heart ni Hi wo Tsukete (ハートに火をつけて)
  - composer: Aika Ohno
2. Kimi e no blues (君へのブルース)
  - composer: Izumi Sakai
3. Heart ni Hi wo Tsukete (ハートに火をつけて) (piano instrumental version)
4. Heart ni Hi wo Tsukete (ハートに火をつけて) (original karaoke)
