= Sayonara wa Ima mo Kono Mune ni Imasu =

Single by Zard

from the album Today Is Another Day
- Released: August 28, 1995
- Genre: Pop rock; pop
- Label: B-Gram Records
- Songwriters: Izumi Sakai, Seiichiro Kuribayashi
- Producer: Daiko Nagato

Zard singles chronology
"Ai ga Mienai" (1995)	"Sayonara wa Ima mo Kono Mune ni Imasu" (1995)	"My Friend" (1996)

"Sayonara wa Ima mo Kono Mune ni Imasu (サヨナラは今もこの胸に居ます)" is the 16th single by Zard and released 28 August 1995 under B-Gram Records label. The single debuted at #1 rank first week. It charted for 8 weeks and sold over 551,000 copies.

== Track list ==
All songs are written by Izumi Sakai.

1. Sayonara wa Ima mo Kono Mune ni Imasu (サヨナラは今もこの胸に居ます)
  - composer: Seiichiro Kuribayashi/arrangement: Takeshi Hayama
    - the song was used in movie (based from dorama) Shiratori Reiko de gozaimasu! as theme song
2. Nemuri (眠り)
  - composer: Izumi Sakai/arrangement: Daisuke Ikeda
3. Sayonara wa Ima mo Kono Mune ni Imasu (サヨナラは今もこの胸に居ます) (original karaoke)
4. Nemuri (眠り) (original karaoke)
