= Aika Ōno =

Japanese singer and songwriter (born 1977)

Aika Ōno 大野 愛果
- Born: September 7, 1977 (age 48); Osaka Prefecture, Japan
- Genres: R&B; J-pop
- Occupations: singer; songwriter; record producer
- Years active: 1998–
- Labels: Giza Studio
- Website: aika-ohno.com

Aika Ōno (大野 愛果, Ōno Aika; born September 7, 1977) is a Japanese singer and songwriter. She is contracted with the Giza Studio record label

Aika is best known for writing songs for several artists under Giza Studio, notably Rina Aiuchi, Mai Kuraki, Aya Kamiki, U-ka Saegusa in db and Zard, among others. Many of her songs have been featured in anime shows such as Detective Conan (or Case Closed in the US), MÄR, Golgo 13, Detective School Q and Secret of Cerulean Sand. To a lesser extent, she released three studio albums containing cover versions of her own song written for other artists, in English and Japanese.

== Discography ==
=== Studio albums ===
List of albums, with selected chart positions
Title	Album details	Peak positions
Title	Album details	JPN Oricon
Shadows of Dreams	Released: January 17, 2002; Label: Giza USA; Format(s): CD	15
Secret Garden	Released: December 4, 2002; Label: Giza Studio; Format(s): CD	39
Silent Passage	Released: December 25, 2013; Label: Giza Studio; Format(s): CD, Digital download	110

== Songwriting credits ==
=== 1990s ===
Show more

List of songs written for other artists, showing year released and album name
Year	Title	Artist(s)	Album/Single	Label
1998	"Ashita Moshi Kimi ga Kowaretemo"	Wands	Awake	B-Gram
1998	"Taiyou"	Yumi Shiina	Taiyou	B-Gram
1998	"Shoujo no Koro ni Modotta Mitai ni"	Zard	Unmei no Roulette Mawashite	B-Gram
1999	"Taiyou no Kuni he Ikou yo Sugu ni -Sora Tobu Yume ni Notte"	Maki Ohguro	Taiyou no Kuni he Ikou yo Sugu ni -Sora Tobu Yume ni Notte	B-Gram
1999	"Tooi Tooi Mirai he"	Deen	Tooi Tooi Mirai he	Berg
1999	"Aoi Kasa de"	Field of View	Aoi Kasa de	Nippon Columbia
1999	"Love, Day After Tomorrow"	Mai Kuraki	Love, Day After Tomorrow	Giza Studio
1999	"I Just Feel So Love Again", "Sweeter Baby", "So Good"	Sweet Velvet	I Just Feel So Love Again: Soba ni Iru Dake de	Giza Studio
1999	"Fairplay", "When it rains", "After all"	Sweet Velvet	Sweet Velvet	Giza Studio
1999	"Lazy Drive"	Sweet Velvet	Lazy Drive	Giza Studio
1999	"Flame of Love"	Sweet Velvet	Flame of love	Giza Studio

=== 2000s ===
Show more

List of songs written for other artists, showing year released and album name
Year	Title	Artist(s)	Album/Single	Label
2000	"Get U're Dream"	Zard	Get U're Dream	B-Gram
2000	"Blue"	Sweet Velvet	I Just Feel So "Sweet"	Giza Studio
2000	"Safety Love"	Soul Crusaders	Safety Love	Giza Studio
2000	"Secret Garden"	Mika Hase	Secret Garden	Giza Studio
2000	"Stay by My side"	Mai Kuraki	Stay by My Side	Giza Studio
2000	"Simply Wonderful"	Mai Kuraki	Simply Wonderful	Giza Studio
2000	"Secret of My Heart", "This is your life"	Mai Kuraki	Secret of My Heart	Giza Studio
2000	"Trying To Find My Way"	Mai Kuraki	Never Gonna Give You Up	Giza Studio
2000	"Delicious Way", "Happy Days"	Mai Kuraki	Delicious Way	Giza Studio
2000	"Reach for the Sky"	Mai Kuraki	Reach for the Sky	Giza Studio
2000	"Close to Your Heart", "Black eyes, Blue tears"	Rina Aiuchi	Close to Your Heart	Giza Studio
2000	"It's Crazy for You", "Golden Moonlight"	Rina Aiuchi	It's Crazy for You	Giza Studio
2000	"Ohh! Paradise Taste!!"	Rina Aiuchi	Ohh! Paradise Taste!!	Giza Studio
2000	"Koi wa Thrill, Shock, Suspense"	Rina Aiuchi	Koi wa Thrill, Shock, Suspense	Giza Studio
2001	"Hero", "Toki no Tsubasa", "Ashita Moshi Kimi ga Kowaretemo"	Zard	Toki no Tsubasa	B-Gram
2001	"Easy Game"	The★tambourines	Easy Game	Giza Studio
2001	"Hijack brandnew days"	The★tambourines	Hijack brandnew days	Giza Studio
2001	"Aoi Aoi Kono Hoshi ni"	Azumi Uehara	Aoi Aoi Kono Hoshi ni	Giza Studio
2001	"Special Holynight"	Azumi Uehara	Special Holynight	Giza Studio
2001	"Lonesome Tonight: Kimi dake Mitsumeteru"	Soul Crusaders	Lonesome Tonight: Kimi dake Mitsumeteru	Giza Studio
2001	"Baby Sweet Sunshine"	Soul Crusaders	Baby Sweet Sunshine	Giza Studio
2001	"Tsumetai Umi", "Start in My Life"	Mai Kuraki	Tsumetai Umi/Start in My Life	Giza Studio
2001	"Always"	Mai Kuraki	Always	Giza Studio
2001	"Brand New Day", "Itsuka wa Ano Sora ni", "The Rose: Melody in the sky"	Mai Kuraki	Perfect Crime	Giza Studio
2001	"Can't Forget Your Love"	Mai Kuraki	Can't Forget Your Love/Perfect Crime: Single Edit	Giza Studio
2001	"Faith"	Rina Aiuchi	Faith	Giza Studio
2001	"Run up"	Rina Aiuchi	Run up	Giza Studio
2002	"Tears go by"	U-ka Saegusa in dB	Secret & Lies	Giza Studio
2002	"Beginning Dream"	Akane Sugazaki	Beginning Dream	Giza Studio
2002	"Like a Star in the Night", "Give me one more chance"	Mai Kuraki	Like a Star in the Night	Giza Studio
2002	"Key to my heart", "Loving you", "Fukigen no Kuni", "Fantasy"	Mai Kuraki	Fairy Tale	Giza Studio
2002	"Forever You ~Eien ni Kimi to~"	Rina Aiuchi	Forever You ~Eien ni Kimi to~	Giza Studio
2002	"Run Up"	Rina Aiuchi	Run Up	Giza Studio
2002	"Can you Feel The Power of Words", "Spark"	Rina Aiuchi	Power of Words	Giza Studio
2003	"Hitomi Tojite"	Zard	Hitomi Tojite	B-Gram
2003	"Ashita wo Yume Mite"	Zard	Ashita wo Yume Mite	B-Gram
2003	"Motto Chikaku de Kimi no Yokogao Mitetai"	Zard	Motto Chikaku de Kimi no Yokogao Mitetai	B-Gram
2003	"Koigokoro"	Akane Sugazaki	Koigokoro	Giza Studio
2003	"Kimi ni Aitakute", "Haru no Hidamari no Naka de", "Truth"	Akane Sugazaki	Beginning	Giza Studio
2003	"Mei Q?!~Meikyuu~Make you"	Hayami Kishimoto	Mei Q?!~Meikyuu~Make you	Giza Studio
2003	"Aisuru Kimi ga Soba ni Ireba"	Hayami Kishimoto	Aisuru Kimi ga Soba ni Ireba	Giza Studio
2003	"Mienai Story"	Hayami Kishimoto	Mienai Story	Giza Studio
2003	"CHU☆TRUE LOVE"	U-ka Saegusa in dB	CHU☆TRUE LOVE	Giza Studio
2003	"I shall be released"	U-ka Saegusa in dB	Kimi to Yakusoku Shita Yasashii Ano Basho made	Giza Studio
2003	"Shocking Blue", "I'm in love", "Igokochi no ii Honey"	U-ka Saegusa in dB	U-ka saegusa IN db 1st ~Kimi to Yakusoku Shita Yasashii Ano Basho made~	Giza Studio
2003	"Double hearted"	Rina Aiuchi	AIR	Giza Studio
2003	"Time After Time (Hana Mau Machi de)"	Mai Kuraki	Time After Time (Hana Mau Machi de)	Giza Studio
2003	"If I Believe", "Tonight, I feel close to you"	Mai Kuraki	If I Believe	Giza Studio
2004	"Toki no Tsubasa", "Tenshi no You na Egao de", "Kanashii Hodo Kyou wa Ame demo"	Zard	Tomatteita Tokei ga Ima Ugokidashita	B-Gram
2004	"Kakegae no Nai Mono", "Mugen Muchuu"	Zard	Kakegae no Nai Mono	B-Gram
2004	"Kyō wa Yukkuri Hanasō"	Zard	Kyō wa Yukkuri Hanasō	B-Gram
2004	"Saraba Seishun no Kage yo", "Shinkirou"	Shinichi Mori	Saraba Seishun no Kage yo	Victor
2004	"Kokoro ga Tomaranai"	Jewelry	Kokoro ga Tomaranai	Giza Studio
2004	"Mune Ippai no Kono Ai wo Dare yori Kimi ni"	Jewelry	Mune Ippai no Kono Ai wo Dare yori Kimi ni	Giza Studio
2004	"So stay together"	Sparkling Point	So stay together	Giza Studio
2004	"Hey Hey Baby! You're NO.1!", "Only One"	Sparkling Point	Hey Hey Baby! You're NO.1!	Giza Studio
2004	"Shizukanaru Melody"	Shiori Takei	Shizukanaru Melody	Giza Studio
2004	"Kimi no Soba de"	Ai Takaoka	Kimi no Soba de	Giza Studio
2004	"Hikari to Kaze to Kimi no Naka de"	Ai Takaoka	Sunny	Giza Studio
2004	"Kaze ni Mukai Aruku youni"	Hayami Kishimoto	Kaze ni Mukai Aruku youni	Giza Studio
2004	"Sutekina Yume Miyoune"	Hayami Kishimoto	Sutekina Yume Miyoune	Giza Studio
2004	"Nemuru Kimi no Yokogao ni Hohoemi wo"	U-ka Saegusa in dB	Nemuru Kimi no Yokogao ni Hohoemi wo	Giza Studio
2004	"Hekonda Kimochi Tokasu Kimi"	U-ka Saegusa in dB	Hekonda Kimochi Tokasu Kimi	Giza Studio
2004	"Egao de Iyouyo", "Sotto Yasashii Kaze ni Fukarenagara"	U-ka Saegusa in dB	Egao de Iyouyo	Giza Studio
2004	"Kokoro ga Tomaranai", "Mune Ippai no Kono Ai wo Dare yori Kimi ni", "Hand to Hand"	U-ka Saegusa in dB	U-ka saegusa IN db II	Giza Studio
2004	"Start"	Rina Aiuchi	Start	Giza Studio
2004	"Boom-Boom-Boom"	Rina Aiuchi	Boom-Boom-Boom	Giza Studio
2004	"Step Up!"	Rina Aiuchi	Playgirl	Giza Studio
2004	"Lover Boy"	Mai Kuraki	Ashita e Kakeru Hashi	Giza Studio
2004	"Taisetsu na Mono"	Yumi Shizukusa	Missing you	Giza Studio
2005	"Hoshi no Kagayaki yo", "Natsu wo Matsu Sail no Yō ni"	Zard	Hoshi no Kagayaki yo/Natsu wo Matsu Sail no Yō ni	B-Gram
2005	"Sayonara made no Distance", "Kimi to no Fureai", "Separate Ways", "Tsuki ni Negai wo"	Zard	Kimi to no Distance	B-Gram
2005	"Shiroi Fantasy", "Nemuru Kimi no Yokogao ni Hohoemi wo"	Jewelry	Shiroi Fantasy	Giza Studio
2005	"Wasurenaide"	Jewelry	Jewelry First	Giza Studio
2005	"Kimi wo Shiranai Machi he"	Shiroi Takei	Kimi wo Shiranai Machi he	Giza Studio
2005	"Tsunagari"	Shiroi Takei	Tsunagari	Giza Studio
2005	"Sekai Tomete"	Shiroi Takei	Sekai Tomete	Giza Studio
2005	"Tonari", "Lost in Paradise"	Shiroi Takei	Second tune ~Sekai Tomete~	Giza Studio
2005	"Honey, feeling for me", "Tell me what", "Love sick", "Chance for you", "I sing a song for you"	Mai Kuraki	Fuse of Love	Giza Studio
2005	"Love, needing"	Mai Kuraki	Love, Needing	Giza Studio
2005	"Through the River"	Mai Kuraki	Dancing	Giza Studio
2005	"Growing of My Heart", "Seven Nights"	Mai Kuraki	Growing of My Heart	Giza Studio
2005	"Tobitatenai Watashi ni Anata ga Tsubasa wo Kureta"	U-ka Saegusa in dB	Tobitatenai Watashi ni Anata ga Tsubasa wo Kureta	Giza Studio
2005	"Donnani Ashita ga Mienakutemo"	U-ka Saegusa in dB	June Bride ~Anata shika Mienai~	Giza Studio
2005	"Fuyu Urara"	Aiko Kitahara	Fuyu Urara	Giza Studio
2005	"Don't stop music"	The★tambourines	Don't stop music	Giza Studio
2005	"Tropical Beach"	Sparkling Point	Tropical Beach	Giza Studio
2005	"Hanakagari"	Yumi Shizukusa	Hanakagari (song)	Giza Studio
2005	"Sora Tobu Ano Shiroi Kubo no You ni"	Sayuri Iwata	Sora Tobu Ano Shiroi Kubo no You ni	Giza Studio
2006	"Kanashii Hodo Anata ga Suki", "Karatto Ikō!"	Zard	Kanashii Hodo Anata ga Suki/Karatto Ikō!	B-Gram
2006	"Heart ni Hi wo Tsukete"	Zard	Heart ni Hi wo Tsukete	B-Gram
2006	"Forever: Anata ni Aitai"	Tsunku	Type 2	Zetima
2006	"State of mind", "Voice of Safest Place"	Mai Kuraki	Diamond Wave	Giza Studio
2006	"Safest Place"	Mai Kuraki	Diamond Wave (song)	Giza Studio
2006	"Shiroi Yuki"	Mai Kuraki	Shiroi Yuki	Giza Studio
2006	"Glorious"	Rina Aiuchi	Glorious/Precious Place	Giza Studio
2006	"Miracle"	Rina Aiuchi	Miracle	Giza Studio
2006	"Delight"	Rina Aiuchi	Delight	Giza Studio
2006	"Kira Kira Sunshine"	Sparkling Point	Kira Kira Sunshine	Giza Studio
2006	"Koi no 1-2-3"	Sparkling Point	Koi no 1-2-3	Giza Studio
2006	"Nemutteita Kimochi Nemutteita Kokoro"	Aya Kamiki	Nemutteita Kimochi Nemutteita Kokoro	Giza Studio
2006	"Bounce, Bounce, Bounce", "Friends", "Secret Code"	Aya Kamiki	Secret Code	Giza Studio
2006	"Do you love me ?", "Who you gonna be"	Yumi Shizukusa	Hanakangari (album)	Giza Studio
2006	"Kitto mou Koi ni wa Naranai"	Shiori Takei	Kitto mou Koi ni wa Naranai	Giza Studio
2006	"Sora Tobu Ano Shiroi Kumo no You ni"	U-ka Saegusa in dB	U-ka saegusa IN db III	Giza Studio
2007	"Glorious Mind"	Zard	Glorious Mind	B-Gram
2007	"Season of Love"	Mai Kuraki	Season of Love	Giza Studio
2007	"Milky way"	Shiori Takei	Diary	Giza Studio
2007	"Nanatsu no Umi wo Wataru Kaze no yōni"	Rina Aiuchi and U-ka Saegusa	Nanatsu no Umi wo Wataru Kaze no yōni	Giza Studio
2007	"Nanatsu no Umi wo Wataru Kaze no yōni (solo version)"	U-ka Saegusa	U-ka Saegusa in d-best: Smile & Tears	Giza Studio
2007	"Misekake no I love you"	Aya Kamiki	"Misekake no I love you	Giza Studio
2007	"Ashita no Tameni"	Aya Kamiki	Ashita no Tameni	Giza Studio
2007	"Sekaijuu no Daremo ga", "You & Me", "Kokoro ga...Mou Sukoshi", "Yume no Naka ni made"	Aya Kamiki	Ashita no Tameni: Forever More	Giza Studio
2008	"You and Music and Dream"	Mai Kuraki	You and Music and Dream	Northern Music
2008	"Ichibyōgoto ni Love for You"	Mai Kuraki	Ichibyōgoto ni Love for You	Northern Music
2008	"Sunday Morning"	Aya Kamiki	Sunday Morning	Giza Studio
2008	"Kimi Sarishi Yuuwaku"	Aya Kamiki	Kimi Sarishi Yuuwaku	Giza Studio
2008	"Summer Memories"	Aya Kamiki	Summer Memories	Giza Studio
2008	"Sekai wa Sore demo Kawari wa Shina"	Aya Kamiki	Sekai wa Sore demo Kawari wa Shinai	Giza Studio
2008	"Dangerous Love"	Pinc Inc	Dangerous Love	Giza Studio
2008	"So faraway"	Pinc Inc	So faraway	Giza Studio
2008	"Daremo ga Kitto Dareka no Santa Claus"	U-ka Saegusa in dB	Daremo ga Kitto Dareka no Santa Claus	Giza Studio
2009	"Revive"	Mai Kuraki	Revive	Northern Music
2009	"Magic"	Rina Aiuchi	Magic	Giza Studio
2009	"Motto Kimi Iro ni Somaritai"	Pinc Inc	Motto Kimi Iro ni Somaritai	Giza Studio
2009	"Trigger", "Hashiridasu Mada Minu Mirai no Hate he"	Saeko Ura	Dice	Giza Studio

=== 2010s ===
Show more

List of songs written for other artists, showing year released and album name
Year	Title	Artist(s)	Album/Single	Label
2010	"Summer Time Gone"	Mai Kuraki	Summer Time Gone	Northern Music
2010	"I Promise", "Tomorrow is The Last Time"	Mai Kuraki	Future Kiss	Northern Music
2010	"Mou Kimi wo Hitori ni Sasenai", "Yorugao no Onshitsu"	U-ka Saegusa in dB	Mou Kimi wo Hitori ni Sasenai	Giza Studio
2010	"Itsumo Sugao no Watashi de Itai"	U-ka Saegusa in dB	Itsumo Sugao no Watashi de Itai	Giza Studio
2010	"Natsu no Owari ni Anata e no Tegami Kakitometeimasu"	U-ka Saegusa in dB	Natsu no Owari ni Anata e no Tegami Kakitometeimasu	Giza Studio
2010	"Shiro no Fantasy", "Kono Sekai ni Kimi ga Iru Dake de", "Gomen ne Ima mo mada Kimi wo Aishiteru kara"	U-ka Saegusa in dB	U-ka saegusa IN db IV ~Crystal na Kisetsu ni Miserarete~	Giza Studio
2010	"Hanabi"	Rina Aiuchi	Hanabi	Giza Studio
2010	"Sing a song"	Rina Aiuchi	Sing a song	Giza Studio
2010	"Danran", "Kudaranai Jinsei"	Nilo Koizumi	Nilo Koizumi	Giza Studio
2011	"1000 Mankai no Kiss"	Mai Kuraki	1000 Mankai no Kiss	Northern Music
2011	"Sakihokore", "Wasurenaide"	U-ka Saegusa in dB	U-ka saegusa IN db Final Best	Giza Studio
2011	"Prologue"	Rina Aiuchi	Last Scene	Giza Studio
2011	"Tear drops", "Good-bye Memories"	Caos Caos Caos	Tear drops	Giza Studio
2012	"Another Day, Another World"	Mai Kuraki	Over The Rainbow	Northern Music
2012	"Kimi no Egao ni Konnani Koishiteru", "Omoide wa..."	Natsuiro	Kimi no Egao ni Konnani Koishiteru	Giza Studio
2012	"Beautiful, "If", "Ano Natsuzora no Sora he to Tsuzuku", "Always be my baby", "Yoru ni Dakarete", "For Dear"	Natsuiro	Ano Natsuiro no Sora he to Tsuzuku	Giza Studio
2013	"Sakura Sakura..."	Mai Kuraki	Try Again	Northern Music
2013	"Natsu no Taiyou no sei ni shite"	Natsuiro	Natsu no Taiyou no sei ni shite	Giza Studio
2013	"A day~ Ryokufuu no Kisetsu~", "Everything for you", "Sayonara Precious", "Akusenkuutou no One Way Love"	Natsuiro	Summer Spur!	Giza Studio
2014	"You Can"	Mai Kuraki	Mai Kuraki Best 151A: Love & Hope	Northern Music
2018	"We Are Happy Women"	Mai Kuraki	We Are Happy Women	Northern Music
2018	"Hanakotoba"	Mai Kuraki	Kimi Omou: Shunkashūtō	Northern Music
2018	"Oh Special Day"	Caos Caos Caos	Noririn Monroe	Giza Studio
2019	"Sukoshi Zutsu Sukoshi Zutsu"	Sard Underground	Sukoshi Zutsu Sukoshi Zutsu	Giza Studio

=== 2020s-present ===
Show more

List of songs written for other artists, showing year released and album name
Year	Title	Artist(s)	Album/Single	Label
2020	"Nemurenu Yoru Ni"	Marie Ueda	Heartbreaker	Giza Studio
2020	"Just believe you"	All at Once	Just believe you	Being
2021	"Black Coffee"	Sard Underground	Black Coffe	Giza Studio
2021	"Ichigo Jam", "Kuroi Bara"	Sard Underground	Orange Iro ni Kampai	Giza Studio
2022	"Christmas Cake"	Sard Underground	Hi no Nagori	Giza Studio
2024	""Hoshi no Hikari", "Futari Shizuka", "Sanae"	Sard Underground	Namida Iro De	Giza Studio
