= Ai ga Mienai =

Single by Zard

from the album Today Is Another Day
- Released: June 5, 1995
- Genre: Rock; dance-rock; rap pop
- Label: B-Gram Records
- Songwriter(s): Masazumi Ozawa, Izumi Sakai
- Producer(s): Daiko Nagato

Zard singles chronology
"Just Believe in Love" (1994)	"Ai ga Mienai" (1995)	"Sayonara wa Ima mo Kono Mune ni Imasu" (1995)

"Ai ga Mienai (愛が見えない)" is the 15th single by Zard and released 5 June 1995 under B-Gram Records label. The single debuted at #2 rank first week. It charted for 11 weeks and sold over 721,000 copies.

== Track list ==
All songs are written by Izumi Sakai.

1. Ai ga Mienai (愛が見えない)
  - composer: Masazumi Ozawa (Pamelah)/arrangement: Takeshi Hayama
2. Teenage Dream
  - composer: Seiichiro Kuribayashi/arrangement: Masao Akashi
  - Deen's Teenage dream self-cover
3. Ai ga Mienai (愛が見えない) (original karaoke)
4. Teenage dream (original karaoke)
  - coupling's karaoke songs came back again after two singles
