= Kyō wa Yukkuri Hanasō =

Single by Zard

from the album Kimi to no Distance
- Released: 24 November 2004
- Genre: Pop; R&B
- Label: B-Gram Records
- Songwriter(s): Izumi Sakai, Aika Ohno
- Producer(s): Daiko Nagato

Zard singles chronology
"Kakegae no Nai Mono" (2004)	"Kyō wa Yukkuri Hanasō" (2004)	"Hoshi no Kagayaki yo/Natsu wo Matsu Sail no Yō ni" (2005)

"Kyō wa Yukkuri Hanasō" (今日はゆっくり話そう) is the 39th single by Zard and released 24 November 2004 under B-Gram Records label. The single debuted at #5 rank first week. It charted for 7 weeks and sold over 33,000 copies.

== Track list ==
All songs are written by Izumi Sakai

1. Kyō wa Yukkuri Hanasō
  - composer: Aika Ohno/arrangement: Akihito Tokunaga
  - Ohno, Aya Kamiki and Shinichiro Ohta (doa) were participating in chorus part
2. Awai Yuki ga Tokete
  - composer: Hiroshi Terao/arrangement: Tokunaga
3. Ame ga Furidasu Mae ni
  - composer: Yuuichirou Awai (U-ka Saegusa in dB)/arrangement: Takeshi Hayama
4. Kyou wa Yukkuri Hanasou (original karaoke)
