= Kokoro wo Hiraite =

Single by Zard

from the album Today Is Another Day
- Released: May 6, 1996
- Genre: Pop rock
- Label: B-Gram Records
- Songwriter(s): Izumi Sakai, Tetsurō Oda

Zard singles chronology
"My Friend" (1996)	"Kokoro wo Hiraite" (1996)	"Don't You See!" (1997)

"Kokoro wo Hiraite (心を開いて)" is a single by Zard, released on May 6, 1996. The single debuted at #1 rank in its first week. It charted for 15 weeks and sold over 747,000 copies, becoming the ninth highest-selling single in her career.

== Track list ==
All songs are written by Izumi Sakai.

1. Kokoro wo Hiraite (心を開いて)
  - composer: Tetsurō Oda/arrangement: Daisuke Ikeda (arranger)
2. Change My Mind
  - composer: Seiichiro Kuribayashi/arrangement: Takeshi Hayama
3. Kokoro wo Hiraite (心を開いて) (original karaoke)
4. Change my mind (original karaoke)
