= Kakegae no Nai Mono =

Single by Zard

from the album Kimi to no Distance
- Released: June 23, 2004
- Genre: Pop rock
- Label: B-Gram Records
- Songwriter(s): Izumi Sakai, Aika Ohno
- Producer(s): Daiko Nagato

Zard singles chronology
"Motto Chikaku de Kimi no Yokogao Mitetai" (2003)	"Kakegae no Nai Mono" (2004)	"Kyō wa Yukkuri Hanasō" (2004)

"Kakegae no Nai Mono (かけがえのないもの)" is the 38th single by Zard and released 23 June 2004 under B-Gram Records label. The single debuted at #4 rank first week. It charted for 6 weeks and sold over 46,000 copies.

== Track list ==
All songs are written by Izumi Sakai

1. Kakegae no Nai Mono (かけがえのないもの)
  - composer: Aika Ohno/arrangement: Satoru Kobayashi
  - Aika Ohno, Shiori Takei and Shinichiro Ohta were participating in chorus part
    - the song was used in [TBS] variety program Koisuru Hanikami as theme song
2. Muga Muchuu (無我夢中)
  - composer: Aika Ohno/arrangement: nightclubbers
3. Eien (永遠) (What a beautiful moment Tour Opening Ver.)
  - composer: Akihito Tokunaga/arrangement: Daisuke Ikeda
    - an orchestral version of song Eien used in live tour as opening ceremonial
4. Kakegae no Nai Mono (かけがえのないもの) (original karaoke)

== Cover ==
The composer of Kakegae no Nai Mono, Aika Ohno self-cover this single in her cover album Silent Passage.
