= Detective Conan: Strategy Above the Depths =

- Theatrical release poster
- Kanji: 名探偵コナン 水平線上の陰謀(ストラテジー)
- Revised Hepburn: Meitantei Konan: Suihei Senjō no Sutoratejī
- Directed by: Yasuichiro Yamamoto
- Written by: Kazunari Kochi
- Based on: Case Closed by Gosho Aoyama
- Produced by: Michihiko Suwa
- Starring: Minami Takayama; Kappei Yamaguchi; Akira Kamiya; Wakana Yamazaki; Megumi Hayashibara; Naoko Matsui; Kenichi Ogata; Yukiko Iwai; Ikue Ohtani; Wataru Takagi; Chinami Nishimura; Kinryū Arimoto; Kōji Yusa; Kōichi Yamadera; Yoshiko Sakakibara
- Music by: Katsuo Ono
- Production company: TMS Entertainment
- Distributed by: Toho
- Release date: April 9, 2005
- Running time: 109 minutes
- Country: Japan
- Language: Japanese
- Box office: ¥ 2.15 billion (US$ 21.8 million)

Detective Conan: Strategy Above the Depths (名探偵コナン 水平線上の陰謀(ストラテジー), Meitantei Konan: Suihei Senjō no Sutoratejī) is the 2005 Japanese animated mystery disaster film and the 9th Case Closed feature film, released on April 9, 2005. The film resulted in 2.15 billion yen, significantly less than the previous five films.

== Plot ==
Fifteen years ago, a cargo ship named Yashiromaru, built by the Yashiro group, sank while colliding with iceberg. Fifteen years later on a new on a 100 million yen luxurious cruise ship named the MS Aphrodite, also built by the Yashiro group, Conan Edogawa and the rest were invited to the cruise through Sonoko Suzuki. Earlier, the husband of the CEO of the Yashiro family group, an established ship architect, apparently had a heart-attack and drove his car down a cliff.

On Aphrodite, the CEO herself was found murdered in her room. Later, her father, the president of the Yashiro group was also found missing. He had been thrown off the cruise into the ocean, seemingly by the same person. At the welcoming party, Kogoro Mouri shows off his deduction skills, and concluded that the sub-designer of the cruise, Minako Akiyoshi, was the murderer.

However, Conan has different ideas. Hironari Kusaka, a scriptwriter who worked in co-operation with Akiyoshi on a script, was the culprit. Kusaka reveals to Aphrodite captain Wataru Kaido that the accident from 15 years ago was a scheme to sink Yashiromaru deliberately to get insurance. His father was murdered when he discovered the captain of the ship was drugged by Kaido when he was a vice captain and left to die. Kusaka immediately set off bombs and escaped by sea and the Detective Boys gave chase.

After they, Juzo Megure, Ninzaburou Shiratori and Wataru Takagi of Tokyo Metropolitan Police Department successfully took down Kusaka, more bombs were ignited. All passengers were evacuated, but Ran returned to her hiding place during the hide-and-seek game to find a "gold medal" made by sea-shells the Detective Boys made for her. However, as Aphrodite swayed, she fainted in the enclosed area. Just before Kaido evacuates, Akiyoshi takes him hostage, turning out she was the real murderer after all, and was the one who did all three killings and made Kusaka think that he did them himself.

Akiyoshi also revealed that her father was the captain who died while Yashiromaru sank. Kogoro, however, deduced correctly this time and managed to subdue Akiyoshi. He was originally trying to find evidence to prove her innocence because of her strong resemblance to his wife Eri Kisaki, but the more investigation he does, the more guilty she became. As Kogoro and Conan began to evacuate, they found out that Ran was missing. They find her under the deck of the boat with the help of a fire axe. Afterwards, a helicopter of Japan Coast Guard comes and picks them up, just before Aphrodite sinks stern-first to the bottom of the ocean.

In the post-credits scene, Conan explained he knew where Ran was because when he kicked the volleyball, Ran said she heard a soccer ball, meaning she was in a place with a tough wall. The Detective Boys come, and told Ran they made a better "gold medal" for her, and put it on her.

== Cast ==
- Minami Takayama as Conan Edogawa
  - Takayama also voices young Shinichi in the flashback
  - Kappei Yamaguchi as Shinichi Kudo
- Akira Kamiya as Kogoro Mouri
- Wakana Yamazaki as Ran Mouri
- Kenichi Ogata as Dr. Hiroshi Agasa
- Chafurin as Juzo Megure
- Atsuko Yuya as Miwako Sato
- Ikue Ohtani as Mitsuhiko Tsuburaya
- Megumi Hayashibara as Ai Haibara
- Naoko Matsui as Sonoko Suzuki
- Wataru Takagi as Genta Kojima and Wataru Takagi
- Yukiko Iwai as Ayumi Yoshida
- Kazuhiko Inoue as Ninzaburo Shiratori
- Chinami Nishimura as Natsuho Tsujimoto
- Isshin Chiba as Kazunobu Chiba
- Kinryū Arimoto as Kensuke Nima
- Kōji Yusa as Katsuhiko Shiomi
- Kōichi Yamadera as Hironari Kusaka
- Yoshiko Sakakibara as Minako Akiyoshi

== Music ==
The theme song is "A Sail Waiting for Summer" (夏を待つセイルのように, Natsu wo Matsu Seiru no yō ni) by Zard. It was released on April 20, 2005. Along with The Fourteenth Target, this is the second theme song written by Zard.

The official soundtrack was released on April 6, 2005. It costs ¥3059, including tax.

== Home media ==
=== DVD ===
The DVD was released on December 14, 2005. The DVD contains the film and the trailer, and costs ¥6090 including tax.

=== Blu-ray ===
The Blu-ray version of the film was released on January 28, 2011. The Blu-ray contains the same content of the DVD plus a mini-booklet explaining the film and the BD-live function.

== See also ==
- Speed 2: Cruise Control, 1997 American film with similar premise.
