= Glorious Mind =

Single by Zard

from the album ZARD Request Best: Beautiful memory
- Released: December 12, 2007
- Recorded: 2006
- Genre: Pop rock, J-pop
- Label: B-Gram Records
- Songwriter(s): Izumi Sakai, Aika Ohno
- Producer(s): Daiko Nagato

Zard singles chronology
"'Heart ni Hi wo Tsukete'" (2006)	"Glorious Mind" (2007)	"'Tsubasa wo Hirogete/Ai wa Kurayami no Naka de'" (2008)

"Glorious Mind" is Zard's 43rd and first posthumous single by Japanese band Zard. It was released single on December 12, 2007 through B-Gram Records label.

== Background ==
The song was the last song recorded by Izumi Sakai before she died. Although the song was not complete at the time of Izumi Sakai's death, the chorus part had been recorded with assistance of Yuri Nakamura from Japanese pop band Garnet Crow. The extra minutes recorded in English were from another unrelated and unreleased song.

The song was used as a 21st opening theme song of Detective Conan.

== Oricon Charting ==
The single debuted at number 2 on the Japanese Oricon weekly charts and sold over 84,000 copies in total. This became Zard's best performing single since 2002.

== Track listing ==
All songs are written by Izumi Sakai and arranged by Takeshi Hayama

#	Kanji	Rōmaji
1.	グロリアス マインド 作曲：大野愛果 作詞：坂井泉水 編曲：葉山たけし	Glorious Mind; Music: Aika Ohno
2.	探しに行こうよ（2007 version） 作曲：徳永暁人 作詞：坂井泉水 編曲：葉山たけし	Sagashi ni Yukou yo (2007 version); Music: Akihito Tokunaga
3.	愛を信じていたい（2007 version） 作曲：徳永暁人 作詞：坂井泉水 編曲：葉山たけし	Ai wo Shinjite Itai (2007 version); Music: Akihito Tokunaga
4.	グロリアス マインド（Instrumental）	Glorious Mind (Instrumental)
