= Today Is Another Day =

Studio album by Zard
- Released: July 8, 1996
- Genres: Rock; blues; electronica
- Length: 57:33
- Label: B-Gram
- Producer: Izumi Sakai

Zard chronology
Forever You (1995)	Today Is Another Day (1996)	Eien (1999)

Singles from Today is Another Day
- 1. "Ai ga Mienai" Released: 5 June 1995; 2. "Sayonara wa Ima mo Kono Mune ni Imasu" Released: 28 August 1995; 3. "My Friend" Released: 8 January 1996; 4. "Kokoro wo Hiraite" Released: 6 May 1996

Today Is Another Day is the seventh album by Zard and was released on July 8, 1996 under B-Gram Records label. Izumi Sakai produced the next four albums.

== Chart performance ==
The album reached #1 rank first week. It charted for 40 weeks and sold more than 1,650,000 copies.

== Track listing ==
All lyrics written by Izumi Sakai.

No.	Title	Music	Arrangers	Length
1.	"My Friend" (マイ フレンド)	Tetsurō Oda	Takeshi Hayama	4:23
2.	"Kimi ga Ita kara" (君がいたから, the song was originally performed by Field of View)	Oda	Hayama	4:21
3.	"Sayonara wa Ima mo Kono Mune ni Imasu" (サヨナラは今もこの胸に居ます)	Seiichiro Kuribayashi	Hayama	5:07
4.	"Love ~Nemurezu ni Kimi no Yokogao Zutto Miteita~" (Love ~眠れずに君の横顔ずっと見ていた~, the song was originally performed by Seiichiro Kuribayashi)	Kuribayashi	Masao Akashi	5:24
5.	"Dan Dan Kokoro Hikareteku" (DAN DAN 心魅かれてく, the song was originally performed by Field of View)	Oda	Daisuke Ikeda	4:32
6.	"Nemuri" (眠り)	Izumi Sakai	Ikeda	5:00
7.	"Kokoro wo Hiraite" (心を開いて)	Oda	Ikeda	4:08
8.	"Totsuzen" (突然, the song was originally performed by Field of View)	Oda	Hayama	4:35
9.	"Kyō mo" (今日も)	Oda	Hayama	4:25
10.	"Today Is Another Day"	Oda	Ikeda	5:16
11.	"Ai ga Mienai" (愛が見えない)	Masazumi Ozawa (Pamelah)	Hayama	4:05
12.	"Mitsumete Itai ne" (見つめていたいね)	Kuribayashi	Akashi	6:17

== In media ==
- My Friend: ending theme for Anime television series Slam Dunk
- Today Is Another Day: theme song for Anime television series Yawara!
- Ai ga Mienai: commercial song of FT Shiseido
- Sayonara wa Ima mo Kono Mune ni Imasu: theme song for movie series "Shiratori Reiko de gozaimasu!"
- Kokoro wo Hiraite: commercial song of Pocari Sweat

== Chart positions ==
Year	Chart	Position	First week sales	Annual sales	Total sales	Yearly position
1996	Japanese Oricon Weekly Albums Chart	1	774,190	1,573,630	1,655,560	12
