= Mō Sukoshi, Ato Sukoshi... =

Single by Zard

from the album Oh My Love
- Released: September 4, 1993
- Genre: Pop rock; soft rock
- Label: B-Gram Records
- Songwriters: Izumi Sakai, Seiichiro Kuribayashi
- Producer: Daiko Nagato

Zard singles chronology
"Yureru Omoi" (1993)	"Mō Sukoshi, Ato Sukoshi..." (1993)	"Kitto Wasurenai" (1993)

"Mō Sukoshi, Ato Sukoshi... (もう少し あと少し…)" is the 9th single by Zard and released 4 September 1993 under B-Gram Records label. The single debuted at #2 rank first week. It charted for 12 weeks and sold over 844,000 copies.

== Track list ==
All songs are written by Izumi Sakai, composed by Seiichiro Kuribayashi and arranged by Masao Akashi

1. Mō Sukoshi, Ato Sukoshi... (もう少し あと少し…)
  - the song was used in TV Asahi drama Lalabai Keiji as ending theme
2. Kanariya (カナリヤ)
3. Mō Sukoshi, Ato Sukoshi... (もう少し あと少し…) (original karaoke)
4. Kanariya (カナリヤ)(original karaoke)
