= My Friend (Zard song) =

Single by Zard

from the album Today Is Another Day
- Released: January 8, 1996
- Genre: Pop rock
- Label: B-Gram Records
- Songwriters: Izumi Sakai, Tetsurō Oda

Zard singles chronology
"Sayonara wa Ima mo Kono Mune ni Imasu" (1995)	"My Friend" (1996)	"Kokoro wo Hiraite" (1996)

"My Friend (マイ フレンド)" is the 17th single by Zard, released 8 January 1996. The single debuted at ranked #1 on its first week. It charted for 21 weeks and sold over a million copies, becoming the third highest-selling single in Zard's career. When she died, it was elected as her third best song on the Oricon polls. The song is best known as the 4th Ending theme for Slam Dunk anime.

== Track list ==
All songs are written by Izumi Sakai.

1. My Friend (マイ フレンド)
  - composer: Tetsurō Oda/arrangement: Takeshi Hayama
    - the song is used as the fourth closing theme song of the anime series Slam Dunk
2. Mezameta asa wa... (目覚めた朝は・・・)
  - composer: Mitsuyoshi Yonezawa/arrangement: Daisuke Ikeda
3. My Friend (マイ フレンド) (original karaoke)
4. Mezameta asa wa... (目覚めた朝は・・・) (original karaoke)
