= Good-bye My Loneliness (album) =

Studio album by Zard
- Released: March 27, 1991
- Genre: Rock
- Length: 25:48
- Label: B-Gram
- Producer: Daiko Nagato

Zard chronology
Good-bye My Loneliness (1991)	Mō Sagasanai (1991)

Singles from Good-bye My Loneliness
- 1. "Good-bye My Loneliness (song)" Released: 10 February 1991

Good-bye My Loneliness is the debut album of Zard released on March 27, 1991, under the B-gram label. In 1991, B-gram released this album in cassette tape and CD format. In 1993, B-Gram Records re-released this album only in CD format (code:BGCH-1003). The album reached #34 rank in the first week of release. It charted for 45 weeks and sold 254,000 copies.

== Track listing ==
All lyrics by Izumi Sakai except "Koi Onna no Yūutsu" and "Onna de Itai" by Daria Kawashima.

No.	Title	Music	Arranger(s)	Length
1.	"Good-bye My Loneliness"	Tetsurō Oda	Masao Akashi	4:35
2.	"Ai wa Kurayami no Naka de" (愛は暗闇の中で)	Seiichirou Kuribayashi	Hiroshi Terao	4:42
3.	"Koi Onna no Yūutsu" (恋女の憂鬱)	Kawashima	Akashi	3:34
4.	"Oh! Sugar Baby"	Kuribayashi	Takeshi Hayama	4:20
5.	"Onna de Itai" (女でいたい)	Kawashima	Hayama	4:30
6.	"It's a Boy"	Kuribayashi	Akashi	4:36

== In media ==
- Good-bye My Loneliness: theme song for drama "Kekkon no Risou to Genjitsu"
