= Hoshi no Kagayaki yo/Natsu wo Matsu Sail no Yō ni =

"Hoshi no Kagayaki yo/Natsu o Matsu Sail no You ni"

Single by Zard

from the album Kimi to no Distance
- Released: April 20, 2005
- Genre: Pop; soft rock; folk rock
- Label: B-Gram Records
- Songwriters: Izumi Sakai, Aika Ohno

Zard singles chronology
"'Kyō wa Yukkuri Hanasō'" (2004)	"Hoshi no Kagayaki yo/Natsu o Matsu Sail no You ni" (2005)	"'Kanashii Hodo Anata ga Suki/Karatto Ikō!'" (2006)

"Hoshi no Kagayaki yo/Natsu o Matsu Sail no Yō ni (星のかがやきよ/夏を待つセイル(帆)のように)" is the 40th single by Zard and released on 20 April 2005 under the B-Gram Records label. The composer of Natsu wo Matsu Sail no Yō ni, Aika Ohno, self-covered this single in her cover album Silent Passage.

The single entered number 2 in Oricon's Singles Chart during its first week. It charted for 13 weeks and sold over 79,000 copies. It is the last single to date that was included in Zard's studio album.

== Track list ==
All songs are written by Izumi Sakai, composed by Aika Ohno and arranged by Takeshi Hayama

1. Hoshi no Kagayaki yo (星のかがやきよ)
  - the song was used as 15th opening theme for anime Detective Conan
2. Natsu o Matsu Sail no Yō ni (夏を待つセイル(帆)のように)
  - the song was used as theme song for anime movie Detective Conan: Strategy Above the Depths
3. Hoshi no Kagayaki yo (星のかがやきよ) (original karaoke)
4. Natsu o Matsu Sail no Yō ni (夏を待つセイル(帆)のように) (original karaoke)
