= Good-bye My Loneliness (song) =

1991 single by Zard

Single by Zard

from the album Good-bye My Loneliness
- Released: February 10, 1991
- Genre: Pop rock; city pop
- Label: B-Gram Records
- Songwriters: Izumi Sakai, Tetsurō Oda
- Producer: Daiko Nagato

Zard singles chronology
| "Good-bye My Loneliness" (1991) | "Fushigi ne..." (1991) |

"Good-bye My Loneliness" is the debut single by the Japanese band Zard. It was released on February 10, 1991 under the B-Gram Records label. The single reached a highest ranking of #9 on the Oricon singles charts. It charted for 15 weeks and sold over 209,000 copies.

== Track list ==
All songs are written by Izumi Sakai.

1. Good-bye My Loneliness
  - composer: Tetsurō Oda/arrangement: Masao Akashi
2. Ai wa Kurayami no Naka de (愛は暗闇の中で)
  - composer: Seiichiro Kuribayashi/arrangement: Zard and Hiroshi Terao
    - In 2008, it was released as the 44th single with collaborated chorus by Aya Kamiki and was used as the 22nd opening theme for Case Closed
