= Seiichiro Kuribayashi =

Japanese singer-songwriter (born 1965)

Seiichiro Kuribayashi 栗林 誠一郎
- Born: 11 February 1965 (age 61)
- Genres: Japanese pop
- Occupations: singer-songwriter, composer, bassist, guitarist, keyboardist
- Years active: 1987–2005
- Label: Vermillion Records
- Website: (WebArchived)

Seiichiro Kuribayashi (栗林 誠一郎, Kuribayashi Seiichirō; born 11 February 1965) is a former Japanese musical composer, keyboardist, singer-songwriter, bassist and guitarist under Vermillion records label.

== Biography ==
During high school at the age of 16, he went studying English for 4 years in Los Angeles.

In 1987, Kuribayashi had started his career as a composer. Stay in my eyes (from album Summer Dream) music composition was provided to popular Japanese band Tube from 80s.

In the same year, he joined to the special unit with Oda Tetsuro and vocalist of Tube, Nagisa no All Stars.

In 1989 he made his major solo debut with album La Jolla.

In years 1990–1993 he was a member of music group B.B.Queens as a back-vocalist and bassist.

In years 1993–1994 he was member of rock band Zyyg.

Meanwhile, as soloist and composer, he'd been providing numerous compositions for artist such as Zard, Maki Ohguro, Wands, Deen and Manish.

In 1995 he created his solo project under the name Barbier with single Christmas Time.

In 1997 he held the first public live Kuribayashi Seiichiro LIVE TOUR '97 "No Pose". Three videoclips from live were included in Music Video DVD footage BEST LIVE & CLIPS released by Being Inc.

In 1998 he released his final studio album Frosted Glass.

In 1999 he held his last live tour '98 Frosted Glass in Shibuya Quatro.

== Discography ==
During his career he has released 9 studio albums, one compilation album and four singles.

=== Studio albums ===
- La Jolla (1989)
- Summer Illusion (1990)
- You Never Know (1991)
- Good-bye to you (1991)
- Awanakutemo I Love You (1993)
- Tooku Hanaretemo (1994)
- Rest of My Life (1995)
- Barbier first (1996) (as Barbier)
- No Pose (1997)
- Frosted Glass (1998)

=== Compilation album ===
- complete of Kuribayashi Seiichiro&Barbier at the BEING studio (2003)

=== Singles ===
- Trend wa Shiro no Theme (Shiroi My Love (1990)
- Good-bye to you (1991)
- Christmas Time (1995) (as Barbier)
- Love: Nemurezuni Kimi no Yokogao Zutto Miteita (1996) (as Barbier)

== List of provided works ==
=== Hideki Saijo ===
- Mou Ichido

=== Zard ===
- Unmei no Roulette Mawashite
- Tooi Hoshi wo Kazoete
- Mō Sukoshi, Ato Sukoshi...
- Kimi ga Inai
- Promised You
- Don't You See!
- Sayonara wa Ima mo Kono Mune ni Imasu
- Change my mind
- Tasogare ni My Lonely Heart
- Boy
- Season
- If you gimme smile

etc.

=== T-Bolan ===
- Osarekirenai Kono Kimochi

=== Michiya Haruhata ===
- Smile on me

=== Keiko Utoku ===
- Mabushii Hito

=== Dimension ===
- Mirage

=== Deen ===
- Itsuka Kitto
- Eien wo Azuketekure
- Teenage Dream

=== Rev ===
- Kowarenagara Utsukushiku nare

=== Manish ===
- Hashiridase Lonely Night
- Yuzurenai Toki
- Kimi no Sora ni Naritai

=== Wands ===
- Sabishisa wa Aki no Iro
- Secret Night -It's My Treat-
- Jumpin' Jack Boy

=== Maki Ohguro ===
- Return to My Love

=== Tube ===
- Dance with you
- Remember me

=== Sayuri Iwata ===
- Kowareta Piano

== Magazine appearances ==
From Music Freak Magazine:

- Vol.11: 1995/October
- Vol.14: 1996/January
- Vol.19: 1996/June (Barbier)
- Vol.25: 1996/December (Barbier)
- Vol.28: 1997/March
- Vol.29: 1997/April
