= Zard =

Japanese pop rock band (1991–2007)

ZARD ザード
- Origin: Tokyo, Japan
- Genres: Rock; pop
- Works: Zard discography
- Years active: 1991–2000, 2002–2007
- Labels: Polydor Japan (1991–1993); B-Gram RECORDS (1993–1998, 2000–2016); Garage Indies Zapping Association (1999)
- Past members: Izumi Sakai; Fumihito Machida; Hiroyasu Hoshi; Kōsuke Michikura; Kimitaka Ikezawa
- Website: www.wezard.net

YouTube information
- Channel: zardofficial
- Years active: 2011–present
- Subscribers: 511 thousand
- Views: 435 million
- Last updated: August 4, 2026

Zard (ザード, Zādo) (stylized as ZARD) were a Japanese pop rock group, originally with five members, with lead vocalist Izumi Sakai as its only constant member. Izumi Sakai was also the band's core member. Zard's work was sold under the record label B-Gram Records, Inc. Their most popular and successful songs are "Makenaide" (1993) (負けないで), "Yureru Omoi" (1993) (揺れる想い), and "My Friend" (1996). As of 2023, Zard has sold over 38 million records, making them one of the best-selling music artists in Japan.

== Career ==
Zard began when the former CEO of Being Corporation, Daikō Nagato, recruited a 24-year-old model named Sachiko Kamachi. Changing her name to Izumi Sakai in an attempt to cut off her past, she created a group called Zard. Zard made a breakthrough with the release of their debut single February 10, 1991 Good-bye My Loneliness, which was a theme song for the Fuji TV drama "Ideals and Reality of Marriage" featuring Misako Tanaka. The song was very successful, reaching No. 9 in the Oricon rankings.

Zard's next two singles did not sell as well. The fourth, "Nemurenai Yoru wo Daite" (眠れない夜を抱いて) took a slightly different approach. The group's rock style had morphed to popular while the seemingly dark music videos turned to a relatively brighter image. In fact, half of Zard's official appearances on TV were related to performing this song, which sold 440,000 copies. At that time, Music Station host Kazuyoshi Morita (aka Tamori) asked Sakai what had taken Zard so long to be on stage. Sakai's reply was that they had wanted to make sure Zard would be an economically viable project and hence did not want to go public prematurely.

The major breakthrough for the group came with their sixth single in 1993, "Makenaide", which became No. 1 in the Oricon charts and went on to sell over 1.8 million copies. Zard went on to release two more songs that reached No. 1, "Yureru Omoi" and "Kitto Wasurenai" in the same year. An album titled "Yureru Omoi" featuring both "Makenaide" and "Yureru Omoi" sold two million copies, the first million milestone for the group in album sales. In fact, Being was so successful in the early 1990s that it was called Being Boom. No one sold more CDs than Zard in this year.

In 1996, Zard had one more million-selling hit, "My Friend". Although their sales fluctuated among six digits in sales for the remainder of the twentieth century, nine of twenty-one singles reached No. 1 and six reached No. 2. Only two could not break the top four mark. Since "Yureru Omoi" (揺れる想い) they also had three hits selling one million and one other hitting two million copies. On August 31, 1999, Zard held their first concert aboard the cruise ship Pacific Venus, where six hundred people were randomly selected out of a million applicants. The DVD for this concert, released on January 26, 2000, had a limited production of 300,000 copies.

Besides being the driving force of Zard (and so much so that it became synonymous with her alone), Izumi Sakai was a very prolific lyricist. She wrote 150 songs during her 17-year career (numerous songs for other artists as well as all of the Zard songs except for two, Koionna no Yūutsu (恋女の憂鬱) and Onna de Itai (女でいたい) from their first album, Good-bye My Loneliness, which were written by Daria Kawashima,) and she released several books of poetry as well. An editorial in the Asahi Shimbun claimed that the secret to Zard's success was that while the trend in Japan showed a decrease in the number of music programs on television, Sakai used late night commercials to air her voice and so advertise her works.

She also wrote songs for other artists, most notably for the J-pop groups that shared her management company: Field of View, Wands and Deen, and the late mainland Taiwanese singer Teresa Teng. She also wrote the lyrics for and participated in the collaboration for the single "Hateshinai Yume o" (果てしない夢を) featuring J-pop groups Zard, Zyyg, Rev & Wands. The single also featured famed Japanese baseball hero Shigeo Nagashima. Some of her singles were used in anime, such as Slam Dunk, Dragon Ball GT and Detective Conan. The lyrics of "Dan Dan Kokoro Hikareteku" (ＤＡＮ ＤＡＮ 心魅かれてく) by Field of View, the opening theme song of Dragon Ball GT, is by Izumi Sakai. Afterward, Zard covered this song in the album Today Is Another Day.

Zard's most successful single, Makenaide (負けないで) has been used as a theme song for Nippon Television program 24-hour TV, an annual Japanese television program in which a celebrity host is on screen continually for a whole day. Sakai said that she was honored at the song's being chosen and looked forward to watching the show. She also said that since Makenaide was widely appreciated by the public, she often felt as if that song was not hers to keep.

Sakai had a reputation for being mysterious. This is partly because her record label did not release much personal information on their artists, but also because she did not make very many personal appearances. She rarely appeared on any live TV music programs (e.g. TV Asahi's Music Station), which had been the main public relations tool for the record industry in Japan since 1993, or made any public appearances. Her first concert was in 1999, this being held on a cruise ship for a mere 600 members of her fan club (300 entries x2 among 2 million concert ticket requests). Her first and only concert tour, "What A Beautiful Moment Tour", was held in 2004, 13 years after her debut. Almost every concert was sold out at the time. The tour ended up having 10 concerts spanning 4 months from March to July 2004, with the final concert held in the famed Nippon Budokan.

Although Zard began as a group, Sakai's dominance within it has led to the name "Zard" often being used in Japan to refer to her alone, as a solo female singer. She used to hold the female record in Japan for most single sales until Ayumi Hamasaki released "No Way to Say". According to the Yomiuri Shimbun, as of August 2007, Zard was No. 8 for the overall total in Japan. She had had 12 singles reach the No. 1 spot on the Oricon Singles Charts, and 9 albums reach the No. 1 spot on the Oricon Album Charts. 43 of her singles reached top 10 in the Oricon rankings. Zard has released a total of 45 singles and 17 albums.

Zard was also featured in Tak Matsumoto's Ihoujin (August 27, 2003). This single was later included in the cover album The Hit Parade produced by Tak Matsumoto.

On a trivial note, Zard's album "Oh My Love" released in 1994 reached No. 1 for the 500th edition of the Oricon Rankings after it began in 1970. She has had 12 singles reach the No. 1 spot on the Oricon.

=== Post-Izumi Sakai Zard ===
On January 23, 2008, an album based on fan requests was released, titled Zard Request Best: Beautiful Memory. NTV Morning News program, Zoom In Super's December 28, 2007 reports that over 500,000 entries were mailed to Being. Surprisingly, Makenaide and Yureru Omoi were not in the top 3, though they did make the top 10. The three songs garnering most votes were 1) Ano Hohoemi o Wasurenaide, 2) Shoujo no Koro ni Modotta Mitai ni, 3) Kakegae no Naimono.

When this album hit number one in the Oricon charts, it marked the eleventh time Zard/Sakai had done so, matching the record held by Dreams Come True for the most number ones by female vocal groups.

== Sakai's death ==
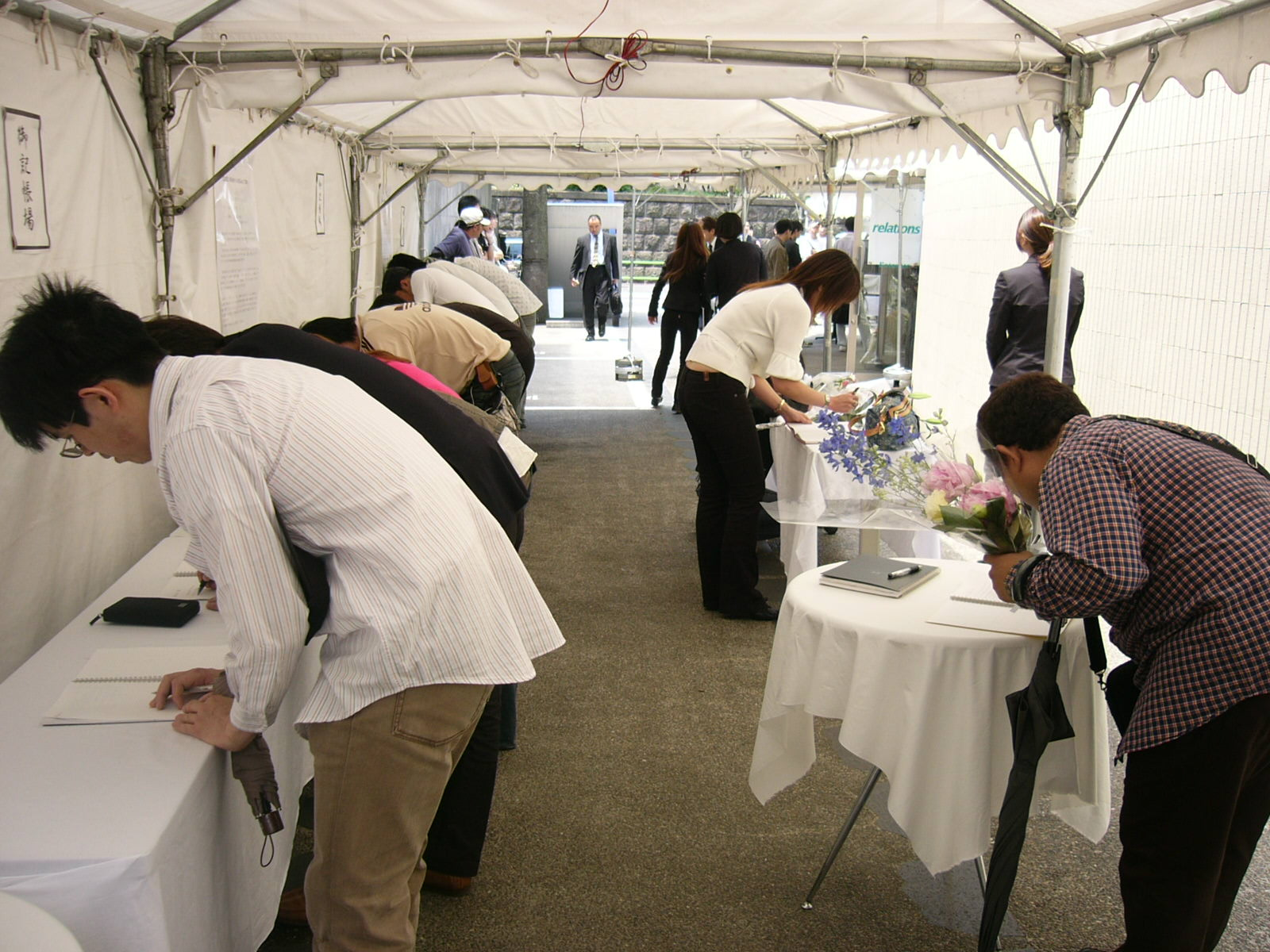
Fans of Izumi Sakai writing messages for her to the signature notebooks in Zard's agency on May 31, 2007.

Founding member Izumi Sakai died on May 27, 2007, at the age of 40 in Keio University Hospital. She had entered the hospital in June 2006 after discovering she had cervical cancer and had the tumor removed. In April 2007, however, the cancer had spread to her lungs, resulting in her re-admittance to hospital. According to the hospital, she took daily walks every morning. During her walk on May 26, she accidentally fell from the stairs and was discovered at around 5:40 a.m. and taken to the ICU. Never regaining consciousness, she died at 3:10 p.m. the following day. An agency spokesman said:

We hope that Izumi Sakai, along with her hit songs, will remain in the memory of her fans.

Sakai had planned to release a new album in the fall, as well as make her first live tour in three years to show her fans that she was fighting strongly against her illnesses.

A memorial service for fans was held on June 27 in a funeral hall in Aoyama, Tokyo. On the previous day, a memorial service for the people concerned was held and Maki Ohguro and Tetsuro Oda and others were in attendance. At the same time, Tak Matsumoto and Koshi Inaba of B'z, Mai Kuraki and Shigeo Nagashima made announcements in her remembrance.

Two compilation albums were planned for release on August 15, one including a selection of Sakai's personal favorite songs, and the other including favorites chosen by her staff. A fan-selected compilation album was also planned for the fall. Two tribute concerts were held—one on September 7 at Osaka Festival Hall, and the other on September 14 at Tokyo Nippon Budokan. These two places were chosen because they were the first and last stops respectively of the What a beautiful moment Tour in 2004—the only tour Zard had made. The new tour was called "What a Beautiful Memory".

In September 2007, an audience of 13,000 participated in a memorial Budokan concert. Nine screens were set up to show previously unseen footage of Izumi Sakai, and the first single released after her death, Glorious Mind, was played. This was a song that Sakai had recorded before her hospitalization, and was used as the opening theme song of the anime series Case Closed. It was not complete at the time of Sakai's death, but the chorus footage was complete. Extra minutes where she was singing in English were incorporated from a previously unrelated and unreleased song as well.

== Band members ==
=== Principal members ===
- Izumi Sakai – lead vocals (1991–2007; her death)

=== Other members ===
- Fumihito Machida – guitar (1991–1993)
- Hiroyasu Hoshi – bass (1991–1992)
- Kōsuke Michikura – drums (1991–1993)
- Kimitaka Ikezawa – keyboards (1991–1993)

== Discography ==
=== Studio albums ===
- Good-Bye My Loneliness (1991)
- Mō Sagasanai (1991)
- Hold Me (1992)
- Yureru Omoi (1993)
- Oh My Love (1994)
- Forever You (1995)
- Today Is Another Day (1996)
- Eien (1999)
- Toki no Tsubasa (2001)
- Tomatteita Tokei ga Ima Ugokidashita (2004)
- Kimi to no Distance (2005)

== Live ==
=== Zard Cruising & Live ===
- 08/31/1999 Pacific Venus, Tokyo Harbor, Tokyo Metropolitan Prefecture

=== What a Beautiful Moment Concert Tour 2004 ===
- 03/02/2004 Festival Hall, Osaka, Osaka Prefecture
- 03/06/2004 Tokyo International Forum, Tokyo Metropolitan Prefecture
- 03/09/2004 Tokyo International Forum, Tokyo Metropolitan Prefecture
- 04/05/2004 Kobe International House, Hyogo Prefecture
- 04/08/2004 Pacifico Yokohama, Kanagawa Prefecture
- 04/30/2004 Festival Hall, Osaka, Osaka Prefecture
- 05/08/2004 Aomori City Cultural Hall, Aomori Prefecture
- 05/10/2004 Sendai Sunplaza Hall, Sendai Prefecture
- 06/02/2004 Nagoya Century Hall, Aichi Prefecture
- 06/11/2004 Fukuoka Sun Palace, Fukuoka Prefecture
- 07/23/2004 Nippon Budokan, Tokyo Metropolitan Prefecture

=== What a Beautiful Memory Concert Tour 2007–2009 ===
- 09/06/2007 Osaka Festival Hall, Osaka Prefecture
- 09/07/2007 Osaka Festival Hall, Osaka Prefecture
- 09/14/2007 Nippon Budokan, Tokyo Metropolitan Prefecture
- 01/19/2008 Kobe International Forum (International Hall), Hyogo Prefecture
- 02/02/2008 Pacifico Yokohama (Prefectural University Hall), Kanagawa Prefecture
- 02/10/2008 Izumi City, Prefecture
- 02/24/2008 Sapporo City Education & Cultural Forum, Hokkaido Prefecture
- 03/08/2008 Ishikawa Health & Pension Forum, Ishikawa Prefecture
- 03/15/2008 Aichi Health & Pension Forum, Aichi Prefecture
- 03/22/2008 Niigata Prefecture People's Forum, Niigata Prefecture
- 04/05/2008 Sunport Hall Takamatsu (Large Hall), Kagawa Prefecture
- 04/28/2008 Fukuoka Citizens' Forum, Fukuoka Prefecture
- 05/03/2008 Hiroshima Estelle Plaza, Hiroshima Prefecture
- 05/04/2008 Ehime Prefecture Citizen Cultural Forum (Subhall), Ehime Prefecture
- 05/23/2008 Doshima River Forum, Osaka Prefecture
- 05/24/2008 Doshima River Forum, Osaka Prefecture
- 05/25/2008 Doshima River Forum, Osaka Prefecture
- 05/27/2008 National Yoyogi Athletic Field (First Gymnasium), Tokyo Metropolitan Prefecture
- 05/15/2009 Doshima River Forum, Osaka Prefecture
- 05/16/2009 Doshima River Forum, Osaka Prefecture
- 05/27/2009 Nippon Budokan, Tokyo Metropolitan Prefecture

=== What a Beautiful Memory ~Forever You~ ===
- 05/27/2011 Nippon Budokan, Tokyo Metropolitan Prefecture
- 05/29/2011 Grand Cube Osaka, Osaka Prefecture

=== What a Beautiful Memory ~25th Anniversary~ ===
- 05/21/2016 Orix Theater, Osaka Prefecture
- 05/26/2016 Tokyo Dome City Hall, Tokyo Metropolitan Prefecture

== See also ==
- List of best-selling music artists in Japan
- Sard Underground
