= Field of View discography =

- Studio albums: 5
- Compilation albums: 6
- Singles: 22
- Video albums: 2

The discography of the Japanese rock band Field of View consists of five studio albums, two DVDs and twenty-two singles.

== Studio albums ==
	Release date	Title	Label	Peak Oricon position
1st	October 10, 1995	Field of View I	Zain Records	1
2nd	October 2, 1996	Field of View II	Zain Records	4
3rd	September 30, 1998	Field of View III ~Now Here No Where~	Nippon Columbia	13
4th	August 25, 1999	Lovely Jubbly	Nippon Columbia	24
5th	March 29, 2000	Capsule Monster	Nippon Columbia	43

== Compilation albums ==
	Release date	Title	Peak Oricon position	Label	Format
1st	October 8, 1997	Singles Collection +4	3	Zain Records	CD, digital download
2nd	October 11, 2000	Field of View Best: Fifteen Colours	23	Nippon Columbia	CD
3rd	October 9, 2002	Memorial Best: Gift of Melodies	19	Zain Records	CD, digital download
4th	August 20, 2003	Complete of Field of View at the Being Studio	83	B-Gram Records	CD, digital download
5th	December 12, 2007	BEST OF BEST 1000 FIELD OF VIEW	107	B-Gram Records	CD
6th	June 12, 2013	FIELD OF VIEW BEST HITS	107	B-Gram Records	CD
7th	May 13, 2020	FIELD OF VIEW 25th Anniversary Extra Rare Best 2020	TBA	Zain Records	2CD+DVD

== Singles ==
=== view ===
	Release date	Title	Personnel	Peak Oricon position	Album	Label
1st	February 9, 1994	Ano Toki no Naka de Bokura wa (あの時の中で僕らは)	Lyrics：U-ya Asaoka; Composer：U-ya Asaoka; Arranger：Daisuke Ikeda	97	Singles Collection +4	Zain Records
2nd	August 10, 1994	Mayowanaide (迷わないで)	Lyrics：U-Ya Asaoka; Composer：Yoshio Tatano; Arranger: Daisuke Ikeda	-	Field of View I	Zain Records

=== Field of View ===
	Release date	Title	Personnel	peak Oricon position	Album	Label
3rd	May 15, 1995	Kimi ga Ita kara (君がいたから)	Lyrics：Izumi Sakai (Zard); Composer：Tetsuro Oda; Arranger：Takeshi Hayama	3	Field of View I	Zain Records
4th	July 24, 1995	Totsuzen (突然)	Lyrics：Izumi Sakai; Composer：Tetsuro Oda; Arranger：Takeshi Hayama	2	Field of View I	Zain Records
5th	November 13, 1995	Last Good-bye	Lyrics：Izumi Sakai; Composer：Yoshio Tatano; Arranger：Takeshi Hayama	3	Field of View II	Zain Records
6th	March 11, 1996	Dan Dan Kokoro Hikareteku (DAN DAN 心魅かれてく)	Lyrics：Izumi Sakai; Composer：Tetsuro Oda; Arranger：Takeshi Hayama	4	Field of View II	Zain Records
7th	May 20, 1995	Doki... (ドキッ)	Lyrics：Yuri Yamamoto; Composer：U-ya Asaoka; Arranger：Takeshi Hayama	4	Field of View II	Zain Records
8th	November 18, 1996	Dreams	Lyricist：Arisa Tsujio; Composer：Tetsuro Oda; Arranger：Akihito Tokunaga	14	Singles Collection +4	Zain Records
9th	April 23, 1997	Kono Machi de Kimi to Kurashitai (この街で君と暮らしたい)	Lyrics：Miho Komatsu; Composer：Miho Komatsu; Arranger：Takeshi Hayama	14	Singles Collection +4	Zain Records
10th	May 20, 1998	Kawaita Sakebi (渇いた叫び)	Lyrics：Miho Komatsu; Composer：Miho Komatsu; Arranger：Masazumi Ozawa (Pamelah)	19	Field of View III ~Now Here No Where~	Nippon Columbia
11th	July 29, 1998	Meguru Kisetsu wo Koete (めぐる季節を越えて)	Lyrics：U-ya Asaoka; Composer：U-ya Asaoka; Arranger：Field of View, Daisuke Ikeda	32	Field of View III ~Now Here No Where~	Nippon Columbia
12th	September 23, 1998	Kimi wo Terasu Taiyou ni (君を照らす太陽に)	Lyrics：U-ya Asaoka; Composer：Takashi Oda; Arranger：Field of View, Daisuke Ikeda	35	Field of View III ~Now Here No Where~	Nippon Columbia
13th	March 17, 1999	Crash	Lyrics：Nana Azuki (Garnet Crow); Composer：Masaaki Watanuki; Arranger：Daisuke Ikeda	35	Lovely Jubbly	Nippon Columbia
14th	May 19, 1999	Aoi Kasa de (青い傘で)	Lyrics：Nana Azuki; Composer：Aika Ōno; Arranger：Field of View, Akihito Tokunaga	34	Lovely Jubbly	Nippon Columbia
15th	July 28, 1999	Still	Lyrics：U-ya Asaoka; Composer：Field of View; Arranger：Field of View, Akihito Tokunaga	39	Lovely Jubbly	Nippon Columbia
16th	December 22, 1999	Fuyu no Ballad (冬のバラード)	Lyrics：Kanako Oda; Composer：Yoshio Tatano; Arranger：Daisuke Ikeda	35	Capsule Monster	Nippon Columbia
17th	February 23, 2000	Beautiful Day	Lyrics：U-ya Asaoka; Composer：Hiroshi Terao; Arranger：Field of View, Daisuke Ikeda	48	Capsule Monster	Nippon Columbia
18th	October 11, 2000	Fuyu Kaze no Monochrome (秋風のモノクローム)	Lyrics：Kanako Oda; Composer：Yoshio Tatano; Arranger：Field of View, Daisuke Ikeda	32	Memorial Best: Gift of Melodies	Nippon Columbia
19th	February 21, 2001	Truth of Love	Lyrics：U-ya Asaoka; Composer：Masaaki Kono; Arranger: Field of View, Daisuke Ikeda	48	Memorial Best: Gift of Melodies	Nippon Columbia

=== the Field of View ===
	Release date	Title	Personnel	Peak Oricon position	Album	Label
20th	May 30, 2001	Natsu no Kioku (夏の記憶)	Lyrics：Kanako Oda; Composer：Shoji Inoshima; Arranger：Kenji Niitsu	49	Memorial Best: Gift of Melodies	Zain Records
21st	July 25, 2001	Shinkiro (蜃気楼)	Lyrics：Kenta Takamori; Composer：Kenta Takamori; Arranger：Kenji Niitsu	52	Memorial Best: Gift of Melodies	Zain Records
22nd	July 10, 2002	Melody	Lyrics: Takuto Kobayashi composer：Takashi Oda; Arranger：Kenji Niitsu	23	Memorial Best: Gift of Melodies	Zain Records

== DVD ==
Release dates	Title	Label	Peak Oricon position
October 9, 2002	View Clips ~Memorial Best~	Zain Records	9
February 12, 2003	The Field of View Final Live “Live Horizon-SUPERIOR 2002 ~Gift of Memories~	Zain Records	10
August 8, 2012	Legend of 90s J-Rock Best Live & Clips	B-Gram Records	59
August 8, 2013	BEING LEGEND Live Tour 2012	Being Inc.	25
