= Daisuke Ikeda (arranger) =

Japanese musical arranger and keyboardist

Daisuke ikeda 池田大介
- Born: March 3, 1964 (age 62); Yamaguchi, Japan
- Genres: Japanese pop, Rock
- Occupations: arranger, keyboardist, recording director
- Years active: 1987–present
- Label: Zain Records

Daisuke Ikeda (池田大介, Ikeda Daisuke) is a Japanese musical arranger and keyboardist in distributors Being Inc.

== Biography ==
In 1990s Ikeda entered to Being Inc. agency where he provided arrangement and strings arrangement for several of famous artist including Zard, Deen, Field of View or Mi-ke. Ikeda was also involved with arranging famous Anime song Moonlight Densetsu by Dali under alias name Ikeda Daisuke (池田大輔).

In 2000s he entered to Giza Studio where he provided arrangements for minor artist as Miho Komatsu. In 2002 he appeared on final live of Field of View as strings arranger.

During 2000s period he composed original soundtracks for several Anime television series such as a Fighting Beauty Wulong or Saiyuki Reload.

In years 2008-2013 he regularly appeared Garnet Crow live concerts as a string arranger, on final live he provided special arrangement on song Sora ni Hanabi wo. In May 2016, Ikeda participated in Zard's live tour session "25th Anniversary Live" as a keyboardist. DVD footage was released on December.

He's active as of 2019.

== List of provided works as arranger ==
★ album ☆ single/coupling

=== Mi-Ke ===
- Suki sa, Suki sa ☆
- Kimi ni Aitai ★
- Nagai Kami no Shoujo ★
- Ano Toki Kimi wa Wakakatta ★
- Blue Moon no you ni ☆
- Surfin Japan ☆
- Kanashiki Teddy Boy ☆

=== Zard ===
- Sayonara Ienakute, Ai wa Nemutteru (Hold Me) ★
- Konna ni Soba ni Iru no ni (album version) ☆
- Kiraku ni Ikou, I'm In love (Forever You) ★
- Kokoro wo Hiraite ☆
- Dan Dan Kokoro Hikareteku, Nemuri, Today Is Another Day (Today is Another Day) ★
- My Baby Grand ~Nukumori ga Hoshikute~ ☆
- Good day
- Unmei no Roulette Mawashite ☆
- Motto Chikaku de Kimi no Yokogao Mitetai ☆

=== T-Bolan ===
- Be Myself

=== Yumiko Morishita ===
- Koi to Rikutsu (Kick Off!) ★

=== Aiko Yanagihara ===
- Don't let me down ☆
- Kitto Futari Aete Yokatta ☆

=== Deen ===
- Sugao de Waratteitai ☆
- Kimi ga Inai Natsu ☆
- Yume de Aru youni ☆
- Tooi Sora ☆
- Kimi Sae Ireba ☆
- DEEN Classics One WHITE Christmas time ★
- Nichiyoubi ★
- Itsuka Boku no Ude no Naka de ☆
- Sayonara mo Iwanaide Rain ☆
- Umi no Mieru Machi ☆
- Go with you ☆
- Ame no Roppongi ☆
- Circle ★

=== B'z ===
- Love Me, I Love You ☆
- Love Phantom ☆
- Mienai Chikara (Invisible One)/Move ☆
- Calling ☆
- Banzai ☆
- Ocean ☆
- Lonely Stars ☆
- Super Love Song ☆

=== Dali ===
- Moonlight Densetsu ☆

=== Manish ===
- Kimi no Sora ni Naritai ☆

=== Wands ===
- Secret Night: It's my treat ☆
- Sabitsuita Machine Gun de Kimi wo Uchinukou ☆

=== Miho Komatsu ===
- My destination ☆
- Anata ga Iru kara ☆
- Yakusoku no Umi (Miho Komatsu 5 : source) ★
- Rakuen, Last Letter (Miho Komatsu 6th : Hanano) ★
- Jaa ne, Sore Jaa ne (Miho Komatsu 7 : prime number) ★
- Namida no Ato ni (Miho Komatsu 8 : a piece of cake) ★

=== Field of View ===
- Mayowanaide ☆
- Kitto Hanareteitemo, Moonlight, Tomadoi no Kisetsu (Field of View I) ★
- Promise you, Kimi no Koe ga Kikitakute (Field of View II) ★
- Meguru Kisetsu wo Koete ☆
- Kimi wo Terasu Taiyou ni ☆
- Kaze yo, everywhere, Natural, Omoidasu yo Kimi no Egao wo, Nagareru Kumo, I'm thinking a lot of you (Field of View III ~Now Here No Where~)★
- Crash ☆
- Natsu no Katasumi de, Kimi, Sunday Morning, Juunigatsu no Mahou Time is gone (Lovely Jubbly) ★
- Fuyu no Ballade ☆
- Beautiful Day ☆
- Kiseki no Hana, Sayonara to Aozora, Kodou (Capsule Monster) ★

=== Chigiri Akiyoshi ===
- Muryoku ☆

=== Mai Kuraki ===
- Fushigi no Kuni (Fairy Tale) ★
- Ashita e Kakeru Hashi ☆
- Shiroi Yuki ☆

=== Aiko Kitahara ===
- Omoide ni Sukuwaretemo ☆

=== Aiuchi Rina ===
- Kaze no Nai Umi de Dakishimete ☆
- Kuuki ☆

=== Breakerz ===
- Winter Bell ☆

=== Renka ===
- Yume Hirari ☆

== List of composed Anime television soundtracks ==
Complete list of provided anime soundtracks.

- Secret of Cerulean Sand
- Project ARMS
- Cheeky Angel
- Detective School Q
- Saiyuki Reload
- Monkey Turn
- Saiyuki Gunlock
- MÄR
- Fighting Beauty Wulong
- Golgo 13
- Young Black Jack
