= Field of View Best: Fifteen Colours =

Greatest hits album by Field of View
- Released: 11 October 2000
- Recorded: 1994–2000
- Genre: Japanese pop
- Length: 64 minutes
- Label: Nippon Columbia
- Producer: BMF

Field of View chronology
Capsule Monster (2000)	Field of View Best: Fifteen Colours (2000)	Memorial Best: Gift of Melodies (2002)

Field of View Best: Fifteen Colours is the second greatest hits album by Japanese pop-rock band Field of View. It was released on 11 October 2000 on Nippon Columbia, on the same day as their 16th single "Akikaze no Monochrome". The album includes various singles and songs from their previous studio albums. The album reached #23 in its first week and sold 11,000 copies. The album charted for 2 weeks and sold more than 15,000 copies.

== Track listing ==
No.	Title	Lyrics	Music	Arrangers	Length
1.	"Totsuzen" (突然, 2nd single)	Izumi Sakai	Tetsurō Oda	Takeshi Hayama	4:33
2.	"Crash" (11th single)	Azuki Nana (Garnet Crow)	Masaaki Watanuki	Daisuke Ikeda	3:53
3.	"Fuyu no Ballad" (冬のバラード, 14th single)	Kanako Oda	Yoshio Tatano	Daisuke Ikeda	4:47
4.	"Still" (13th single)	U-ya Asaoka	Field of View	Akihito Tokunaga and Field of View	4:10
5.	"Doki" (ドキッ, 5th single)	Yuri Yamamoto	U-ya Asaoka	Takeshi Hayama	4:37
6.	"Natural" (from 3rd studio album Field of View III ~Now Here No Where~)	U-ya Asaoka	U-ya Asaoka	Daisuke Ikeda and Field of View	4:46
7.	"Juunigatsu no Mahou" (12月の魔法, from 4th studio album Lovely Jubbly)	U-ya Asaoka	U-ya Asaoka	Daisuke Ikeda and Field of View	4:14
8.	"Aoi Kasa de" (青い傘で, 12th single)	Azuki Nana (Garnet Crow)	Aika Ōno	Akihito Tokunaga and FIELD OF VIEW	4:24
9.	"Beautiful day" (15th single)	U-ya Asaoka	Hiroshi Terao	Daisuke Ikeda and FIELD OF VIEW	4:01
10.	"Kimi." (君。, from 4th studio album Lovely Jubbly)	U-ya Asaoka	Takashi Oda	Daisuke Ikeda and FIELD OF VIEW	3:29
11.	"Kawaita Sakebi" (渇いた叫び, from 3rd studio album Field of View III ~Now Here No Where~)	Miho Komatsu	Miho Komatsu	Masazumi Ozawa (Pamelah)	4:37
12.	"Soba ni Itakatta -Stand Alone-" (そばにいたかった～STAND ALONE～, 9th single's c/w)	Takashi Oda	U-ya Asaoka	Daisuke Ikeda and FIELD OF VIEW	4:12
13.	"Meguru Kisetsu wo koete" (9th single)	U-ya Asaoka	U-ya Asaoka	Daisuke Ikeda and FIELD OF VIEW	3:37
14.	"Kokoro no Mukou Ken" (心の向こう側, 10th single's c/w)	U-ya Asaoka	U-ya Asaoka	Daisuke Ikeda and FIELD OF VIEW	3:55
15.	"Kimi wo Terasu Taiyou ni" (君を照らす太陽に, 10th single)	U-ya Asaoka	Takashi Oda	Daisuke Ikeda and FIELD OF VIEW	4:17

== Cover version ==
Miho Komatsu covered "Kawaita Sakebi" on her 6th album, Hanano. Zard covered "Totsuzen" on their 7th studio album, Today Is Another Day.
