= Takeshi Hayama =

Japanese composer (born 1958)

Takeshi Hayama 葉山たけし
- Born: June 16, 1958 (age 68)
- Genres: Japanese pop rock
- Occupations: arranger composer guitarist
- Years active: 1978-
- Website: (WebArchived)

Takeshi Hayama (葉山たけし, Hayama Takeshi; born 16 June 1958) is a Japanese musical arranger and guitarist under Being Inc. records.

== Biography ==
In 1978, he debuted with his own blues band Hanashin ((花伸)) under Trio Records. In 1990s he entered to Being recording agency. Takeshi becomes the main arranger of Japanese singer-songwriter Maki Ohguro. Along with Masao Akashi they were the most busy arrangers during 90s. During the same period time he provided arrangements for another Being artist as Zard, Deen or Wands as is under charge of arranging famous million-sells hits as Makenaide, Kono Mama Kimi Dake wo Ubaisaritai, Motto Tsuyoku Kimi wo Dakishimetara or Anata Dake Mitsumeteru. After the establishment of Giza Studio, he continued providing arrangements for artist as Aiuchi Rina, U-ka Saegusa in dB or Aya Kamiki. Takeshi appears sometimes as a supportive guitarist in Hills Pan Kōjō Live. Since 2012, he's a music teacher of rock and pop department in Senzoku Gakuen of Music. In celebration of his 60 birthday, he held special live with former vocalist of Field of View, U-ya Asaoka. He is active as of 2021.

== List of provided works as an arranger ==
=== Maki Ohguro ===
- Harlem Nights
- La La La
- Natsu ga Kuru
- Atsuku Nare
- Anata Dake Mitsumeteru
- Chotto
- Da Da Da
- Shiroi Graduation
- Eien no Yume ni Mukatte
- Ichiban Chikaku ni Ite ne

etc.

=== Zard ===
- Makenaide
- My Friend
- Iki mo Dekinai
- Kimi ni Aitaku Nattara...
- Sayonara wa Ima mo Kono Mune ni Imasu
- Ai ga Mienai
- Just Believe in Love
- Don't You See!
- Get U're Dream
- Heart ni Hi wo Tsukete

=== Deen ===
- Kono Mama Kimi Dake wo Ubaisaritai
- Memories
- Omoi Kiri Waratte
- Itsuka Kitto
- Tsubasa wo Hirogete
- Hitomi Sorasanaide
- Hiroi Sekai de Kimi ni Deatta
- Teenage Dream
- Eien wo Azuketekure
- Love Forever

=== Wands ===
- Motto Tsuyoku Kimi wo Dakishimetara
- Jumpin Jack Boy
- Sekai wa Owaru Made wa
- Koiseyo Otome
- Tenshi ni Nante Narenakatta
- Million Miles Away
- Don't Cry
- Flower
- Keep on Dream
- Foolish OK

=== T-Bolan ===
- Heart of Stone
- Afurederu Kanjou
- Namida no Egao
- Omoide ga Sagashiteru
- Love
- Baby Blue
- Tooi Ai no Refrain
- Natsu no Owari ni
- Shiny Days
- Friends

=== Field of View ===
- Kimi ga Ita kara
- Totsuzen
- Last Good-bye
- Dan Dan Kokoro Hikareteku
- Kono Machi de Kimi to Kurashitai

=== Rev ===
- Dakishimetai
- I just fall in love
- Amai Kiss Kiss
- Hateshinai Yume wo
- Break Down

=== Baad ===
- Aishitai Aisenai
- Mabushii Romance

=== Keiko Utoku ===
- Anata wa Yume no Naka Sotto Shinobikomitai
- Mabushii Hito

=== Mi-Ke ===
- Pink Christmas

=== Manish ===
- Kono Isshun to Iu Eien no Naka de

=== Miho Komatsu ===
- As, Beautiful Life, Sickness (Miho Komatsu 3rd : everywhere)

=== Aiuchi Rina ===
- Glorious
- Miracle
- Story
- Magic
- Bara ga Saku Bara ga Chiru

=== U-ka Saegusa in dB ===
- Daremo ga Kitto Dare ka no Santa Claus
- Yukidoke no Ano Kawa no Nagare no youni
- Kumo ni Notte
- Itsumono no Egao de Watashi ga Itai
- Precious Memories

=== Mai Kuraki ===
- Growing of My Heart
- Tomorrow is the last Time
- Summer Time Gone
- 1000 Mankai no Kiss
- State of mind

=== Aiko Kitahara ===
- Fuyu Urara
- Sekaijuu Doko wo Sagashitemo
- Utopia
- Natsu Dakara!
- Cobalt Blue

=== Natsuiro ===
- Kimi no Namida wa Konnani Koishiteru
- Natsu no Taiyou no Sei ni shite

== Interview ==
From J-Rock Magazine 1995/June edition
