= Tomatteita Tokei ga Ima Ugokidashita =

Studio album by Zard
- Released: January 28, 2004
- Studio: Birdman West; Giza Hills Studio; Red Way Studio; Blue Way Studio; Green Way Studio; Studio Birdman; Gardenia Studio: Japan
- Genre: Pop; R&B; pop rock; dance-pop
- Length: 50:36
- Label: B-Gram
- Producer: Izumi Sakai

Zard chronology
Toki no Tsubasa (2001)	Tomatteita Tokei ga Ima Ugokidashita (2004)	Kimi to no Distance (2005)

Singles from Tomatteita Tokei ga Ima Ugokidashita
- 1. "Sawayakana Kimi no Kimochi" Released: 22 May 2002; 2. "Ashita wo Yume Mite" Released: 9 April 2003; 3. "Hitomi Tojite" Released: 9 July 2003; 4. "Motto Chikaku de Kimi no Yokogao Mitetai" Released: 12 November 2003

Tomatteita Tokei ga Ima Ugokidashita (止まっていた時計が今動き出した, The Stopped Watch Moved Now) is the 10th album of Zard and was released on January 28, 2004 under B-Gram Records label.

== Chart performance ==
The album reached #2 rank first week. It charted for 20 weeks and sold more than 200,000 copies. The album was certified platinum in 2011.

== Track listing ==
All lyrics written by Izumi Sakai.

No.	Title	Music	Arrangers	Length
1.	"Ashita wo Yume Mite" (明日を夢見て, album mix version)	Aika Ohno	Satoru Kobayashi	4:34
2.	"Toki no Tsubasa" (時間の翼, completed version from album Toki no Tsubasa)	Aika Ohno	Satoru Kobayashi	4:44
3.	"Motto Chikaku de Kimi no Yokogao Mitetai" (もっと近くで君の横顔見ていたい)	Aika Ohno	Daisuke Ikeda	4:30
4.	"Pray"	Akihito Tokunaga	Satoru Kobayashi	4:27
5.	"Deai Soshite Wakare" (出逢いそして別れ)	Michiya Haruhata	Michiya Haruhata and Daisuke Ikeda	5:26
6.	"Tomatteita Tokei ga Ima Ugokidashita" (止まっていた時計が今動き出した)	Yuri Nakamura (Garnet Crow)	Akihito Tokunaga	4:12
7.	"Hitomi Tojite" (瞳閉じて)	Aika Ohno	Akihito Tokunaga	4:56
8.	"Sawayakana Kimi no Kimochi" (さわやかな君の気持ち)	Akihito Tokunaga	Dr.Terachi&Pierrot Le Fou	4:55
9.	"Ai de Anata wo Sukuimashou" (愛であなたを救いましょう)	Seiichirou Kuribayashi	Masao Akashi	5:02
10.	"Tenshi no Youna Egao de" (天使のような笑顔で)	Aika Ohno	Akihito Tokunaga	3:45
11.	"Kanashii Hodo Kyou wa Ame de mo" (悲しいほど 今日は雨でも)	Aika Ohno	Satoru Kobayashi	4:06

== In media ==
- Ashita wo Yume Mite: ending theme for anime television series Detective Conan
- Sawayaka na Kimi no Kimochi: commercial song for Kao Corporation
- Hitomi Tojite: theme song for Fuji TV program "Sport!"
- Tomatteita Tokei ga Ima Ugokidashita: theme song for drama "Igiari! Onna Bengoushi Ookano Rie"
