= Field of View I =

FIELD OF VIEW I

Studio album by Field of View
- Released: October 10, 1995
- Recorded: 1995
- Genre: J-Pop
- Length: 43 minutes
- Label: Zain Records
- Producer: BMF

Field of View chronology
FIELD OF VIEW I (1995)	Field of View II (1996)

Singles from FIELD OF VIEW I
- 1. "Mayowanaide" Released: August 10, 1994; 2. "Kimi ga Ita kara" Released: May 15, 1995; 3. "Totsuzen" Released: July 24, 1995

Field of View I is the first studio album by Japanese group Field of View. The album was released on October 10, 1995 by Zain Records. The album reached #1 on the Oricon chart for its first week with 321,390 sold copies. It charted for 15 weeks and sold 628,210 copies.

== Track listing ==
No.	Title	Lyrics	Music	Arranger(s)	Length
1.	"Sepia" (セピア)	U-ya Asaoka	Yoshio Tatano	Jun Abe	4:15
2.	"Totsuzen" (突然)	Izumi Sakai	Tetsurō Oda	Takeshi Hayama	4:33
3.	"Koi ga Ai ni Kawatteyuku Made ni" (恋が愛に変わってゆくまでに)	U-ya Asaoka	U-ya Asaoka	Jun Abe	3:43
4.	"Kitto Hanareteitemo" (きっと離れていても)	U-ya Asaoka	U-ya Asaoka	Daisuke Ikeda	4:56
5.	"Think of myself"	U-ya Asaoka	Yoshio Tatano	Jun Abe	4:42
6.	"Mayowanaide" (迷わないで)	U-ya Asaoka	Yoshio Tatano	Daisuke Ikeda	4:31
7.	"Moonlight" (とまどいの季節)	U-ya Asaoka	Yoshio Tatano	Daisuke Ikeda	3:29
8.	"Tomadoi no Kisetsu"	U-ya Asaoka	Yoshio Tatano	Daisuke Ikeda	3:28
9.	"Ashita no Tameni" (明日のために)	U-ya Asaoka	U-ya Asaoka	Jun Abe	4:40
10.	"Kimi ga Ita kara" (君がいたから)	Izumi Sakai	Tetsurō Oda	Takeshi Hayama	4:08

== Usage in media ==
- Kimi ga Ita Kara was used as the theme song for the Fuji TV drama "Kagayaku Kisetsu no Naka de".
- Sepia was used in a TV commercial for the 1996 "Toei Anime Fair" to promote Dragon Ball: The Path to Power.
- Totsuzen was used in a commercial for Pocari Sweat.
- Think of myself was used in a commercial for the "Astel Kansai Corporation".
- Mayowanaide was used as the ending theme for the TV Asahi program "Mokugeki! Dokyun".

== Cover ==
Zard covered "Totsuzen" and "Kimi ga Ita kara" on their album Today Is Another Day.
