= Singles Collection +4 =

Greatest hits album by Field of View
- Released: 8 October 1997
- Recorded: 1994–1997
- Genre: Japanese pop
- Label: Zain Records
- Producer: BMF

Field of View chronology
Field of View II (1996)	Singles Collection +4 (1997)	Field of View III ~Now Here No Where~ (1998)

Singles Collection +4 is the first greatest hits album by Japanese pop-rock band Field of View. It was released on 8 October 1997 under Zain Records. Album includes all singles released from "Ano Toki no Naka de Bokura wa" until "Kono Machi de Kimi to Kurashitai". Four new songs were released exclusively for this album. The album reached #3 in its first week and sold 142,030. The album charted for 7 weeks and sold more than 438,000 copies.

== Track listing ==
No.	Title	Lyrics	Music	Arrangers	Length
1.	"Mou Ichido" (もう一度, new song)	Kanako Oda	Yoshio Tatano	Masao Akashi	4:38
2.	"Kono Machi de Kimi to Kurashitai" (この街で君と暮らしたい, 7th single)	Miho Komatsu	Miho Komatsu	Takeshi Hayama	4:53
3.	"Dreams" (6th single)	Arisa Tsujio	Tetsurō Oda	Akihito Tokunaga	4:24
4.	"Doki" (ドキッ, 5th single)	Yuri Yamamoto	U-ya Asaoka	Takeshi Hayama	4:37
5.	"Dan Dan Kokoro Hikareteku" (DAN DAN 心魅かれてく, 4th single)	Izumi Sakai	Tetsurou Oda	Takeshi Hayama	3:34
6.	"Last Good-bye" (3rd single)	Izumi Sakai	Yoshio Tatano	Hirohito Furui	3:49
7.	"Totsuzen" (突然, 2nd single)	Izumi Sakai	Tetsurou Oda	Takeshi Hayama	4:33
8.	"Kimi ga Ita kara" (君がいたから, 1st single)	Izumi Sakai	Tetsurou Oda	Takeshi Hayama	4:08
9.	"Mayowanaide" (迷わないで, 2nd view single)	U-ya Asaoka	Yoshio Tatano	Ikeda Daisuke	4:31
10.	"Ano Toki no Naka de Bokura wa" (あの時の中で僕らは, 1st view single)	U-ya Asaoka	U-ya Asaoka	Daisuke Ikeda	4:43
11.	"Oozora he" (大空へ, new song)	Miho Komatsu	Miho Komatsu	Hiroshi Terao	5:10
12.	"Aru Hareta Hi" (ある晴れた日, new song)	Kanako Oda	U-ya Asaoka	Akihito Tokunaga	4:17
13.	"Someday" (6th single's c/w)	U-ya Asaoka	U-ya Asaoka	Akihito Tokunaga	3:31
14.	"Ano Koro no Boku ni" (あの頃の僕に, new song)	U-ya Asaoka	U-ya Asaoka	Ikeda Daisuke	5:15

== Cover ==
Miho Komatsu covered Oozora he on her 6th album, Hanano and Kono Machi de Kimi to Kurashitai on her debut album, Nazo. Zard covered Last Good-bye on their last studio album, Kimi to no Distance; Kimi ga Ita kara, Totsuzen and Dan Dan Kokoro ga Hikareteku on their 7th studio album, Today Is Another Day.

== Usage in media ==
- Dan Dan Kokoro Hikareteku was used as the opening theme for the anime series Dragon Ball GT
- Doki was used in a commercial for All Nippon Airways as part of promoting their "ANA's Paradise" service.
- Last Good-bye was used as the ending theme for the Tokyo Broadcasting System Television drama "Discovery of the World's Mysteries".
- Kimi ga Ita Kara was used as theme song for the Fuji TV drama "Kagayaku Kisetsu no Naka de".
- Totsuzen was used in a commercial for Pocari Sweat.
- Mayowanaide was used as the ending theme for the TV Asahi program "Mokugeki! Dokyun".
- Kono Machi de Kimi to Kurashitai was used as the ending theme for the TV Asahi program "Chou Jigen Time Bomber".
- Ano Toki no Naka de Bokura wa was used in a commercial for 7-Eleven.
