= Hagane =

Hagane (鋼) means "steel" in Japanese.

Hagane may also refer to:

- Hagane (band), a Japanese heavy metal band
- Hagane: The Final Conflict, a video game
- Hagane, a manga by Masaomi Kanzaki
- A Space Noah Class starship from the game Super Robot Taisen: Original Generation and its sequel
- The nickname of the 4th Tank Division of the Imperial Japanese Army during the second world war
- A central character in the Japanese manga anthology Glass Wings
- A steel used for making blades (which may also be called tamahagane), such as those in Japanese swords, chisels or planes
