= Asaoka =

Asaoka (written: 麻丘, 浅岡, 朝丘, 浅丘, or 淺岡) is a Japanese surname. Notable people with the surname include:

- Megumi Asaoka (麻丘 めぐみ; born 1955), Japanese pop singer and actress
- Misuzu Asaoka (浅岡 美鈴), Japanese author of Glass Wings
- Ruriko Asaoka (浅丘 ルリ子; born 1940), Japanese actress
- Shunsuke Asaoka (淺岡 俊亮; born 1996), Japanese rugby union player
- Tomoyasu Asaoka (浅岡 朝泰; 1962–2021), Japanese former professional footballer
- U-ya Asaoka (浅岡 雄也; born 1969), Japanese singer-songwriter and musician, member of pop rock band Field of View
- Yukiji Asaoka (朝丘 雪路; 1935–2018), Japanese actress and singer

== Fictional characters ==
- Natsumi Asaoka (朝丘 夏美), a character from The Kabocha Wine manga series
