= Memorial Best: Gift of Melodies =

Greatest hits album by Field of View
- Released: 9 October 2002
- Recorded: 1994–2002
- Genre: Japanese pop
- Length: 64 minutes
- Label: Zain Records
- Producer: BMF

Field of View chronology
| Field of View Best: Fifteen Colours (2000) | Memorial Best: Gift of Melodies (2002) |

Memorial Best: Gift of Melodies is the third and the last greatest hits album by Japanese pop-rock band Field of View. It was released on 9 October 2002 on Zain Records, on the same day as their music video compilation "View Clips -Memorial Best-". The album includes their released singles and some unreleased songs. The "view" singles are not included. The album reached #19 in its first week and sold 12,000 copies. The album charted for 2 weeks and sold more than 16,000 copies. After the album's release and their last live performance, Field of View disbanded.

== Track listing ==
=== Disc 1 ===
| No. | Title | Lyrics | Music | Arrangers | Length |
|---|---|---|---|---|---|
| 1. | "gift" (new song) | Takuto Kohashi | Takashi Oda | Kenji Niitsu | 5:02 |
| 2. | "Kimi ga Ita kara" (君がいたから, 1st single) | Izumi Sakai | Tetsurō Oda | Takeshi Hayama | 4:08 |
| 3. | "Totsuzen" (突然, 2nd single) | Izumi Sakai | Tetsurō Oda | Takeshi Hayama | 4:33 |
| 4. | "Last Good-bye" (3rd single) | Izumi Sakai | Yoshio Tatano | Takeshi Hayama | 3:48 |
| 5. | "Dan Dan Kokoro Hikareteku" (DAN DAN 心魅かれてく, 4th single) | Izumi Sakai | Tetsurō Oda | Takeshi Hayama | 3:35 |
| 6. | "Doki" (ドキッ, 5th single) | Yuri Yamamoto | U-ya Asaoka | Takeshi Hayama | 4:37 |
| 7. | "Dreams" (6th single) | Arisa Tsujio | Tetsurō Oda | Akihito Tokunaga | 4:24 |
| 8. | "Kono Machi de Kimi to Kurashitai" (この街で君と暮らしたい, 7th single) | Miho Komatsu | Miho Komatsu | Takeshi Hayama | 4:53 |
| 9. | "Kawaita Sakebi" (渇いた叫び, 8th single) | Miho Komatsu | Miho Komatsu | Masazumi Ohzawa (ex.Pamelah) | 4:37 |
| 10. | "Meguru Kisetsu wo Koete" (めぐる季節を越えて, 9th single) | U-ya Asaoka | U-ya Asaoka | Daisuke Ikeda and FIELD OF VIEW | 5:11 |
| 11. | "Kimi wo Terasu Taiyou ni" (君を照らす太陽に, 10th single) | U-ya Asaoka | Takashi Oda | Daisuke Ikeda and FIELD OF VIEW | 4:37 |

=== Disc 2 ===
| No. | Title | Lyrics | Music | Arrangers | Length |
|---|---|---|---|---|---|
| 1. | "CRASH" (11th single) | Azuki Nana (Garnet Crow) | Masaaki Watanuki | Daisuke Ikeda | 3:54 |
| 2. | "Aoi Kasa de" (君がいたから, 12th single) | Azuki Nana | Aika Ōno | Akihito Tokunaga and FIELD OF VIEW | 4:24 |
| 3. | "Still" (13th single) | U-ya Asaoka | FIELD OF VIEW | Akihito Tokunaga and FIELD OF VIEW | 4:10 |
| 4. | "Fuyu no Ballad" (冬のバラード, 14th single) | Kanako Oda | Yoshio Tatano | Daisuke Ikeda | 4:26 |
| 5. | "Beautiful day" (15th single) | U-ya Asaoka | Hiroshi Terao | Daisuke Ikeda and FIELD OF VIEW | 4:01 |
| 6. | "Akikaze no Monochrome" (秋風のモノクローム, 16th single) | Kanako Oda | Yoshio Tatano | Daisuke Ikeda | 5:16 |
| 7. | "Truth of Love" (17th single) | U-ya Asaoka | Masaaki Kono | | 4:43 |
| 8. | "Natsu no Kioku" (夏の記憶, 18th single) | Shoji Inojima | Kanako Oda | Daisuke Ikeda and Kenji Niitsu | 4:56 |
| 9. | "Shinkiro" (蜃気楼, 19th single) | Kenta Takamori | Kenta Takamori | Kenji Niitsu | 4:42 |
| 10. | "Melody" (20th single) | U-ya Asaoka | Takashi Oda | Kenji Niitsu | 4:46 |
| 11. | "gift" (acoustic version) | | | | 5:07 |

== Cover versions ==
Miho Komatsu covered Oozora he on her 6th album, Hanano and Kono Machi de Kimi to Kurashitai on her debut album, Nazo. Zard covered Last Good-bye on their last studio album, and Kimi to no Distance, Kimi ga Ita kara, Totsuzen and Dan Dan Kokoro Hikareteku on their 7th studio album, Today Is Another Day.

== Usage in media ==
- Kimi ga Ita Kara was used as the theme song for the Fuji TV drama "Kagayaku Kisetsu no Naka de".
- Totsuzen was used in a commercial for Pocari Sweat.
- Last Good-bye was used as the ending theme for the Tokyo Broadcasting System Television drama "Discovery of the World's Mysteries".
- Dan Dan Kokoro Hikareteku was used as the opening theme for the anime series Dragon Ball GT.
- Doki was used in a commercial for All Nippon Airways as part of their "ANA's Paradise" promotion.
- Dreams was used as the theme song for the Nihon TV program "Natural Ai no Yukue".
- Kono Machi de Kimi to Kurashitai was used as the ending theme for the TV Asahi program "Chou Jigen Time Bomber".
- Kawaita Sakebi was used as the opening theme for the 1998 anime adaptation of Yu-Gi-Oh!.
- Meguru Kisetsu wo Koete was used as the ending theme for the Fuji TV program Unbelievable.
- Kimi wo Terasu Taiyou Ni was used as the ending theme for the Tokyo Broadcasting System Television program "Uwasa no! Tokyo Magazine".
- Aoi Kasa de was used as the ending theme for the Tokyo Broadcasting System Television program Kinniku Banzuke.
- Still was used as the ending theme for the Tokyo Broadcasting System Television program "Wonderful".
- Fuyu no Ballad was used as the ending theme for the Tokyo Broadcasting System Television program "Kokoro no Tobira".
- Beautiful day was used as the opening theme for the Yomiuri Telecasting Corporation program "Shuffle".
- Akikaze Monochrome was used as the ending theme for the Nihon TV program "Manekin"
- Melody was used as the ending theme for the Tokyo Broadcasting System Television program "COUNT DOWN TV Neo".
