= Akihide =

Japanese guitarist and member of Breakerz

- Also known as: Aki
- Born: Akihide Sato; July 5, 1977 (age 49); Tokyo, Japan
- Genres: Rock, Pop-rock, acoustic, ambient
- Instruments: vocals, guitar, synthesizer
- Years active: 1998-present
- Labels: Avex (1998-2003); B Zone (2007–)
- Website: www.akihide.com/pc/

YouTube information
- Channel: AKIHIDE MOON SIDE THEATER
- Years active: 2020–present
- Subscribers: 1, 740
- Views: 144,024
- Last updated: December 4, 2023

Akihide Satou (Japanese: 佐藤彰秀, Hepburn: Satō Akihide) is a Japanese guitarist, producer and member of the visual kei rock band Breakerz under talent agency B Zone and record label Zain Records.

== Career ==
Between years 1998-2003, Akihide was member of the rock-band Fairy Fore under Avex and between years 2003-2006 member of the band Never Land independently. On the same year when Never Land disbanded, he became member of the rock-band Breakerz along with vocalist Daigo and another guitarist Shinpei signed under Zain Records, one of the major labels of the B Zone agency. The single sold over 100k copies. Since 2012, the music agency B Zone has launched once-in-year event Being Legend: Guitar summit, in which he performs on live venues with such as Michiya Haruhata from Tubee, Hiroshi Shibazaki from Wands, Shinji Tagawa from Deen, Takashi Gomi from T-BOLAN and Takashi Masuzaki from Dimension.

In 2013, he launched his solo career, in which he would mix releases with pure guitar instrumentals and vocal songs. Akihide writes, performs and produces songs on his own. Following the next year in 2014, he released his first home-video release Akihide Live 2013:Amber×Lapis Lazuli. In 2017, he has expand his activities and song-writer provider for the band Acid Black Cherry and in 2019 for the singer Renka. In 2022, he released his first ambient instrumental EP Journey to sleep Nemuri he no Tabiji: 432Hz.

He is active as of 2023.

== Discography ==
As of 2025, he has released 12 albums, 4 digital EPs, 1 physical EP and 1 DVD.

See also the Breakerz discography.

=== Albums ===
Title	Album details	Peak chart positions
Title	Album details	JPN Oricon
Amber	Released: 5 June 2013; Label: Zain Records; Formats: CD, CD+DVD, digital download, streaming	18
Lapis Lazuli	Released: 30 October 2013; Label: Zain Records; Formats: CD, CD+photobook, digital download, streaming	24
Rain Story	Released: 14 May 2014; Label: Zain Records; Formats: CD, CD+DVD, digital download, streaming	20
Tsuki to Hoshi no Caravan	Released: 18 February 2015; Label: Zain Records; Formats: CD, 2CD+DVD, digital download, streaming	57
Furusato	Released: 23 March 2016; Label: Zain Records; Formats: CD, CD+DVD, digital download, streaming	66
Kikai Shikake no Yuenchi: Electric Wonderland	Released: 20 June 2018; Label: Zain Records; Formats: CD, CD+DVD, digital download, streaming	47
Hoshi kai no Shōnen	Released: 15 January 2020; Label: Zain Records; Formats: CD, 2CD, digital download, streaming	30
Loop World	Released: 15 January 2020; Label: Zain Records; Formats: CD, 2CD, digital download, streaming	55
Under City Pop Music	Released: 26 October 2022; Label: Zain Records; Formats: CD, 2CD, digital download, streaming	—
Three Stars	Released: 18 October 2023; Label: Zain Records; Formats: CD, CD+BD, digital download, streaming	36
Fortune	Released: 23 October 2024; Label: Zain Records; Formats: CD	24
Moon Side Story	Released: 15 October 2025; Label: Zain Records; Formats: CD	46

=== EP ===
Title	EP details
Black Unicorn	Released: 2021; Label: Zain Records; Formats: CD

=== Digital EP ===
Year	Single	Ref.
2014	"Premium Night Show "Lapis Lazuli""	
2016	"Tsuki no Fune"	
2022	"Journey to sleep Nemuri he no Tabiji: 432Hz"	
2023	"Healing Planetarium:432Hz"	

=== DVD/BD ===
Title	Album details
Akihide Live 2013 "Amber×Lapis Lazuli"	Released: 23 November 2014; Label: Zain Records; Formats: 2DVD

== Tours ==
- AKIHIDE 1st Live Tour 2013 "Amber" (2013)
- AKIHIDE LIVE TOUR 2014 "RAIN MAN" (2014)
- AKIHIDE Live Tour 2016 Sakura no Mori no Mankai no Shita de (2016)
- AKIHIDE Live Tour 2016 Zoku: Sakura no Mori no Mankai no Shita de (2016)
- AKIHIDE LIVE TOUR 2020 Hoshikai no Shonen (2020)
- AKIHIDE LIVE TOUR 2021 Black Unicorn (2021)
- AKIHIDE LIVE TOUR 2023 Three Stars (2023)
