= Dragon Ball: The Path to Power =

- Theatrical release poster
- Kanji: ドラゴンボール 最強への道
- Revised Hepburn: Doragon Bōru Saikyō e no Michi
- Directed by: Shigeyasu Yamauchi
- Screenplay by: Aya Matsui
- Based on: Dragon Ball by Akira Toriyama
- Starring: see below
- Cinematography: Masaru Sakanishi
- Edited by: Shinichi Fukumitsu
- Music by: Akihito Tokunaga
- Production company: Toei Animation
- Distributed by: Toei Company
- Release date: March 4, 1996 (Japan)
- Running time: 80 minutes
- Country: Japan
- Language: Japanese
- Box office: ¥1.0 billion (est.)

Dragon Ball: The Path to Power (Japanese: ドラゴンボール 最強への道, Hepburn: Doragon Bōru Saikyō e no Michi) is a 1996 Japanese animated fantasy martial arts adventure film and the seventeenth film based on Akira Toriyama's Dragon Ball manga, and the final film in the series to use cel animation. It is an alternate retelling of the original Dragon Ball anime series, borrowing story elements from the first Dragon Ball search and the later Red Ribbon Army storyline. It was released in Japan on March 2 at the Toei Anime Fair, along with the film version of Neighborhood Story. The film was produced to commemorate the tenth anniversary of the original Dragon Ball anime. It was also the last theatrically released Dragon Ball film produced, until the release of Dragon Ball Z: Battle of Gods in 2013.

== Plot ==
Goku is a monkey-tailed boy with superhuman strength and skilled in martial arts, living all alone on Mount Paozu. One day, after he catches a fish to eat, a girl in a car (Bulma) almost hits him. He mistakes the car for a monster and throws it onto its side, but gets shot by Bulma in return. He imagines she is some kind of demon, but she manages to convince him she is human, even though she does not have a tail. Remembering his dead grandpa's advice to be nice to girls, he invites her into his house. When they enter, Goku shows Bulma an orange glowing ball that he believes is his grandpa. All of a sudden, Bulma comes to life and asks if she can have the ball. When Goku protests, she brings about two more "grandpas", and explains to him the legend of the Dragon Balls and the Eternal Dragon. She offers to let him feel her up to get him to come along, but when that does not work, she tells him it will help him get stronger. He agrees, thus starting off a life changing journey.

Later, in the forest, they are forced to stop because of a bull/ox in the road, who demands the girl. Goku ends up fighting the creature, which turns into a robot, and then a bat. Unfortunately, by then, his five minutes are up, and he turns back into Oolong, the pig. There is no time for apologies though, because Yamcha attacks. He demands all the capsules and money they have, but not before Puar recognizes Oolong and yells at him for his perverted antics at Shapeshifting School. Yamcha fights Goku, and appears to have the upper hand, until Bulma wakes up. This puts him into a state of shock and he is forced to retreat with the help of Puar.

Bulma, Oolong, and Goku are driving northward towards the next Dragon Ball, only to discover a huge metal tower in the distance (Yamcha and Puar, who have been following them, stay in a cave nearby to keep warm). Soldiers come out and "welcome" them to Muscle Tower, and Goku takes all of them head on. Entering the tower he runs into Major Metallitron. He brushes him off quickly though, and discovers (to his shock) that Metallitron was a robot. General White of the Red Ribbon Army gives orders, and the remaining forces rush toward Goku, but he plows through them all, up into White's room. White then activates the tower's deadliest creation—Android 8. The android nearly strangles Goku, though refusing to kill him when ordered. As a result, White threatens to detonate the android, but Goku intervenes and saves him. The two make quick friends, with Android 8 explaining that he doesn't believe in fighting or killing. Goku complains that his name is weird, so he nicknames him "Eighter" for short. This ends in a snowball fight between the two while the tied-up forces (including White) look on.

Some time later, while driving in Oolong's house-wagon, they almost run over (and then almost fall off a cliff because of) a Turtle. He explains that he is quite lost, and needs help getting back to the sea. After they bring him there, he says he has a reward which he will bring back with him the next day. So, Oolong, Goku, and Bulma spend the night on the beach. Goku wakes up early in the morning and tries to sleep in Bulma's lap, but freaks out when he removes her panties and discovers her lack of the male genitalia. That morning, Turtle comes back bearing his "reward"—Master Roshi, the Turtle Hermit. He first tries to summon the Immortal Phoenix for them, but when that fails (it apparently died), he calls forth the Nimbus Cloud. Goku is the only one of the bunch who can ride it, so it becomes his.

While Goku's off on the Nimbus, Bulma discovers that the old man has a Dragon Ball. He offers to let go of it only if she shows him her underwear. She agrees, not knowing she does not have any on, and both Roshi and Oolong are pleasantly surprised. She is horrified after she goes in to change and finds her underwear still inside. There is no time for an explanation though, because General Blue of the Red Ribbon Army attacks with a fleet of battleships. When the situation seems just about hopeless, Roshi decides to use his legendary Kamehameha wave. He decimates the entire fleet with it, but Blue then orders his army of submarines to attack. Goku however, manages to learn the Kamehameha himself and destroys a good deal of the subs with it. But just as their situation is looking up, Goku is knocked out by a missile, and Bulma, Yamcha, Oolong, Puar, and Roshi are all captured by Blue's soldiers. The five are carted off to prison near Red Ribbon Headquarters. The next morning, Goku awakens to the beeping of the Dragon Radar. Finding himself alone, he sets out in search of the other six Dragon Balls (Blue, having missed the one on Goku's person, is executed for his failure). Goku fights through legions upon legions of Red Ribbon soldiers, while in the meantime, the others try to make their escape from the prison.

Eventually, they make it out, to discover Goku (carrying a pile of tanks) there to greet them. As Goku fights his way into Red Ribbon HQ, Commander Red and Officer Black retreat with their six Dragon Balls to their last refuge. But when Black hears about Red's true wish—to become taller, Black kills Red and swears to make the Red Ribbon Army rulers of the world. He brings out the Army's greatest weapon, a powerful giant robot. The robot's beam weapon destroys a huge swath of territory in its path, and nearly kills Goku, until he manages to knock it on its stomach and detonate the cannon. Black and his robot are not out yet though, and Goku is eventually knocked out. Luckily, Android 8 shows up. He puts everything he has into keeping the robot from killing the boy, but it is clear that he is no match. Parts start to fly off of him, and he lands in a crumpled heap, next to Goku.

Goku comes to, only to see the android die. Saddened and enraged by Android 8's sacrifice, a hidden power suddenly awakens within Goku, as the ground and all of his friends shake with his tortured tears and screams. Black makes the mistake of egging him on, and Goku finishes him off with a gigantic Kamehameha. After the dust settles, Goku is still crying and screaming to Android 8's death. Finally, the Eternal Dragon Shenron is summoned forth, but Bulma and Yamcha realize they do not need their wishes anymore. Goku then offers his own wish instead: to revive Android 8 and remove the bomb inside of him.

== Cast ==
Character name	Voice actor	
Character name	Japanese	English
Character name	Japanese	Funimation (2003)
Goku	Masako Nozawa	Stephanie Nadolny
Bulma	Hiromi Tsuru	Tiffany Vollmer
Yamcha	Tōru Furuya	Christopher Sabat
Oolong	Naoki Tatsuta	Brad M. Jackson
Pu'erh	Naoko Watanabe	Puar
Pu'erh	Naoko Watanabe	Monica Antonelli
Kame-Sennin (Turtle Hermit)	Kinya Aikawa	Master Roshi
Kame-Sennin (Turtle Hermit)	Kinya Aikawa	Mike McFarland
Turtle	Daisuke Gōri	Christopher Sabat
Commander Red	Kenji Utsumi	Josh Martin
Staff Officer Black	Masaharu Satō	Christopher Sabat
General Blue	Bin Shimada	Sonny Strait
General White	Hirohiko Kakegawa	Kyle Hebert
Colonel Violet	Kazuko Sugiyama	Kasey Buckley
Sergeant Metallic	Hisao Egawa	Major Metallitron
Sergeant Metallic	Hisao Egawa	Chris Rager
Artificial Human 8 (Hacchan)	Shōzō Iizuka	Android 8 "Eighter"
Artificial Human 8 (Hacchan)	Shōzō Iizuka	Mike McFarland
Shenlong	Kenji Utsumi	Shenron
Shenlong	Kenji Utsumi	Christopher Sabat
Narrator	Jōji Yanami	Brice Armstrong

A second English dub produced and released exclusively in Malaysia by Speedy Video features an unknown voice cast.

== Music ==
- Main Theme Song:
  - "Dan Dan Kokoro Hikareteku"
    - Lyrics by Izumi Sakai
    - Music by Tetsurō Oda
    - Arranged by Takeshi Hayama
    - Performed by Field of View

== Box office ==
At the Japanese box office in 1996, the film earned a net distribution rental income of ¥600 million, equivalent to estimated gross receipts of approximately ¥1.0 billion.

== Releases ==
The film was released on VHS and Laserdisc on September 13, 1998. It was released on DVD on February 18, 2009.

The English dubbed version was released on April 29, 2003, in two different VHS and DVD editions (edited and uncut) and later as part of Funimation's Dragon Ball Movie Box, along with Sleeping Princess in Devil's Castle (1987) and Mystical Adventure (1988). Funimation's dub of The Path to Power has received great reception from fans, who have praised their writing and for leaving in the original score. The film was later re-released to DVD in North America on February 8, 2011, in a 4-disc remastered box set with the other three Dragon Ball films.

== Reception ==
Carl Kimlinger of Anime News Network considered the film to be composed of stories already done and done better in the television series.
