= Kimi ga Ita kara =

Single by Field of View

from the album FIELD OF VIEW I
- Released: May 15, 1995
- Genre: J-Pop
- Label: Zain Records, Inc. JP
- Songwriters: Tetsurō Oda, Izumi Sakai

Field of View singles chronology
"Mayowanaide" (1994)	"Kimi ga Ita kara" (1995)	"Totsuzen" (1995)

"Kimi ga Ita kara" (君がいたから) is the 3rd single by Japanese rock band Field of View. It reached #3 on the Oricon chart in its first week and charted for 19 weeks and sold 898,000 copies.

== Track listing ==
1. Kimi ga Ita kara
  - composer: Tetsurō Oda/lyricist: Izumi Sakai/arranger: Takeshi Hayama
  - Keiko Utoku, Izumi Sakai, Daria Kawashima and Yuuichi Ikuzawa are participating in chorus part
  - Zard cover this song on her album Today Is Another Day.
  - the song was used as theme song for Fuji TV drama Kayagaku Kisetsu no Naka de
2. Sepia
  - composer: U-ya Asaoka/lyricist: Yoshio Tatano/arranger: Jun Abe
3. Kimi ga Ita kara (Original Karaoke)
