= Ano Toki no Naka de Bokura wa =

Single by Field of View

from the album SINGLES COLLECTION+4
- Released: February 9, 1994
- Genre: J-Pop
- Label: Zain Records, Inc. JP
- Songwriter: Uya Asaoka

Field of View singles chronology
"Ano Toki no Naka de Bokura wa" (1994)	"Mayowanaide" (1994)

"Ano Toki no Naka de Bokura wa" (あの時の中で僕らは) is the debut single by Japanese rock band Field of View under name view. It reached #97 rank for first week. It charted for one week with totally sold 325 copies. Upcoming single "Mayowanaide" is only single which didn't enter to Oricon charts.

== Track list ==
All tracks are composed and written by Uya Asaoka and arranged by Daisuke Ikeda

1. Ano Toki no Naka de Bokura wa
  - the song was used in 7-Eleven as CM song
  - single and album version has different arrangements
2. Believe me
3. Ano Toki no Naka de Bokura wa (Original Karaoke)
