= Dan Dan Kokoro Hikareteku =

1996 single by Field of View

Single by Field of View

from the album Field of View II
- Released: March 11, 1996
- Genre: Pop rock
- Length: 3:29
- Label: Zain
- Composer: Tetsurō Oda
- Lyricist: Izumi Sakai
- Producers: BMF; Field of View; Izumi Sakai

Field of View singles chronology
"Last Good-bye" (1995)	"Dan Dan Kokoro Hikareteku" (1996)	"Doki" (1996)

"Dan Dan Kokoro Hikareteku" (DAN DAN 心魅かれてく; "Bit by Bit, You're Charming My Heart") is a song written by Izumi Sakai and Tetsurō Oda, originally recorded and released as the fourth single by Japanese rock band Field of View on March 11, 1996. The song serves as the opening theme to the anime series Dragon Ball GT, and the main theme song to the theatrical film Dragon Ball: The Path to Power. The single reached number four on the Oricon Singles Chart, and sold over 400,000 copies. Sakai released a cover of "Dan Dan Kokoro Hikareteku" with her group Zard on their 1996 album Today Is Another Day.

== Background and recording ==
"Dan Dan Kokoro Hikareteku" was written by Izumi Sakai and Tetsurō Oda to serve as the opening theme song to the Dragon Ball GT anime series. U-ya Asaoka, lead singer of Field of View, first heard the song when it was a demo featuring just a guitar, and already felt it was "incredible". He said the band was able to exchange opinions on the track equally with Oda and arranger Takeshi Hayama. Asaoka had imagined writing the lyrics himself, but then received a fax with lyrics written by Sakai; "Now, I'd tried to write lyrics on my own, but hers were just so much better, so incredibly catchy. I thought, 'I simply can't top this.'" He also realized how well they fit with Dragon Ball, "There's the part that goes 'Ai to yuuki to hokori wo motte tatakau yo' ('I'll fight with love, courage, and pride'), and that's just Dragon Ball in a nutshell. The more time passes, the deeper the lyrics seem to get."

Although he found them "wonderfully catchy", Asaoka felt that Sakai's lyrics were a little unusual. "There were some parts where I wasn't really sure how they were meant to fit with the background music. For example, there's a part right before the first chorus that goes, 'Sukoshi dake furimukitakunaru you na toki mo aru kedo', and I had no idea how I was meant to time it all." The singer said they were still trying to find the right pattern by trial and error during recording, until receiving a demo tape of Sakai singing it herself. According to Asaoka, the song's two writers later realized that Sakai's lyrics and Oda's music were created with different phrasing in mind, so putting them together had the unintended effect of creating something different with its own unique appeal.

"Dan Dan Kokoro Hikareteku" is Field of View's first release following keyboardist Jun Abe's departure from the band, and was recorded before bassist Kenji Niitsu had joined. The song's music video was filmed at Kogakuin University. The single's B-side is "Dear Old Days", which was arranged by Akihito Tokunaga, composer of the music in Dragon Ball GT.

Exactly 30 years after the original song was released, Field of View released "Dan Dan Kokoro Hikareteku ~30th Version~" (DAN DAN 心魅かれてく〜30th Version〜) as the b-side to their March 11, 2026, single "La La La La ~Tsugi no Forever~". It is a newly recorded version of the song with a "modern" arrangement.

== Reception ==
The single reached number four on the Oricon Singles Chart, and charted for 11 weeks. It was certified Platinum by the RIAJ for sales of 400,000 copies. Asaoka still performs the song live and stated that, even though he has improved as a singer, he lowers his skill level in order to sing it exactly as he did over 26 years ago. "When a song becomes a hit like that and is loved by so many people, it's not my song anymore—it's theirs.", "I consider it a given that I should perform it the way it always was without changing anything."

Kickboxer Panchan Rina, who derived her ring name from the Dragon Ball character Pan, uses "Dan Dan Kokoro Hikareteku" as her entrance music. Mixed martial artist Shooto Watanabe and Dan Onodera of the baseball team Hanshin Tigers have also used it as entrance music. Following the March 2024 death of Dragon Ball creator Akira Toriyama, the Taiwanese city of Hualien began playing a piano arrangement of "Dan Dan Kokoro Hikareteku" at its city hall to mark the beginning and end of each work day at the suggestion of mayor Wei Chia-hsien, who is a fan of the manga artist.

== Track list ==
No.	Title	Lyrics	Music	Arrangement	Length
1.	"Dan Dan Kokoro Hikareteku" (DAN DAN 心魅かれて)	Izumi Sakai	Tetsurō Oda	Takeshi Hayama
2.	"Dear Old Days"	U-ya Asaoka	U-ya Asaoka	Akihito Tokunaga
3.	"Dan Dan Kokoro Hikareteku (Original Karaoke)" (DAN DAN 心魅かれてく（オリジナルカラオケ）)		Tetsurō Oda	Takeshi Hayama

== Cover versions ==
"Dan Dan Kokoro Hikareteku" has been covered many times in different languages.

- The song's lyricist, Izumi Sakai, released a cover with her group Zard on their 1996 album Today Is Another Day.
- There are two English versions.
  - An English version was sung by Vic Mignogna for the English dub of Dragon Ball GT made by Funimation.
  - Another English version was sung by Adam Hunter for the English dub of Dragon Ball GT made by Blue Water.
- A Latin Spanish version titled "Mi corazón encantado" was sung by Aaron Montalvo for the Latin Spanish version of Dragon Ball GT.
- A Castilian Spanish version titled "Ven, ven" was sung by Momo Cortés for the Castilian Spanish dub of Dragon Ball GT.
- A Spanish version titled "Me cautiva tu sonrisa" was sung by Álvaro Véliz for CD and cassette, titled "La saga de Dragon Ball Z", only in Chile.
- A Brazilian Portuguese version titled "Coração de criança" was sung by Ricardo Fábio for the Brazilian Portuguese dub of Dragon Ball GT.
- There are two European Portuguese versions.
  - A Portuguese version was sung by Ricardo Spínola for the Portuguese dub of Dragon Ball GT.
  - Another Portuguese version was sung by Paulo Espírito Santo for the Portuguese dub of the Dragon Ball GT TV special.
- A Catalan version was sung by Toni Ten for the Catalan dub of Dragon Ball GT.
- A Galician version was sung by Nacho Castaño and Patricia de Lorenzo for the Galician dub of Dragon Ball GT.
- A Basque version was sung by Xeberri Castillo and Ana Guadalupe Fernández for the Basque dub of Dragon Ball GT.
- There are two German versions.
  - A German version titled "Hand in Hand" was sung by Jens-Uwe Bartholomäus for the German dub of the Dragon Ball GT TV special.
  - Another German version titled "Sorae" was performed by the German rock band Anime Allstars for the German dub of Dragon Ball GT.
- A Hebrew version was sung by Eli Lulai, front man of the band Rockfour, for the Hebrew dub of Dragon Ball GT.
- A Thai version titled "Dan Dan" was sung by Jirayu Phongsuwan and Nattakorn Chatikavanich for CD and cassette, titled Highlight Cartoon 9 Songs Hit – Famous Cartoon Party.
- There are two Korean versions.
  - A Korean version was sung by Bang Dae-Sik for the Korean dub of Dragon Ball GT made by Daewon Media.
  - Another Korean version titled "Jeom Jeom Ma-Eum-I Kkeullyeo" was sung by Maeng Su-Min for the Korean dub of Dragon Ball GT made by Tooniverse.
