= Sawayakana Kimi no Kimochi =

Single by Zard

from the album Tomatteita Tokei ga Ima Ugokidashita
- Released: May 22, 2002
- Genre: Pop; pop rock
- Label: B-Gram Records
- Songwriters: Izumi Sakai, Akihito Tokunaga
- Producer: Daiko Nagato

Zard singles chronology
"Promised You" (2000)	"Sawayakana Kimi no Kimochi" (2002)	"Ashita wo Yume Mite" (2003)

"Sawayakana Kimi no Kimochi (さわやかな君の気持ち)" is the 34th single by Zard, released May 22, 2002 under the B-Gram Records label. After one and half year, new and only single was released in 2002. Many fans called this time Zard Chapter 2 Start by maturing and changing the style of songs. The single debuted at #4 rank first week. It charted for 5 weeks and sold over 69,000 copies.

== Track list ==
All songs are written by Izumi Sakai, composed and arranged by Akihito Tokunaga

1. Sawayakana Kimi no Kimochi (さわやかな君の気持ち)
  - Akihito Tokunaga and Tomoyo Yoshida were participating in chorus part
2. Dakishimeteite (抱きしめていて)
  - Akihito Tokunaga was participating in chorus part
3. Seven Rainbow
  - Akihito Tokunaga and Michael Africk were participating in chorus part
4. Sawayakana Kimi no Kimochi (さわやかな君の気持ち) (original karaoke)
