= Ashita wo Yume Mite =

Single by Zard

from the album Tomatteita Tokei ga Ima Ugokidashita
- Released: April 9, 2003
- Genre: Pop
- Label: B-Gram Records
- Songwriters: Izumi Sakai, Aika Ohno
- Producer: Daiko Nagato

Zard singles chronology
"Sawayakana Kimi no Kimochi" (2002)	"Ashita wo Yume Mite" (2003)	"Hitomi Tojite" (2003)

"Ashita wo Yume Mite (明日を夢見て)" is the 35th single by Zard and released 9 April 2003 under B-Gram Records label. After one year, ZARD released new single. The single debuted at #4 rank first week. It charted for 8 weeks and sold over 62,000 copies.

== Track list ==
All songs are written by Izumi Sakai

1. Ashita wo Yume Mite (明日を夢見て)
  - composer: Aika Ohno/arrangement: Satoru Kobayashi
    - the song was used in anime Detective Conan as 17th ending theme
    - OA(on air) version was arranged by Akihito Tokunaga, this version of song was released in 2012 Zard Album collection in Premium Disc
2. Sagashi ni Ikou yo (探しに行こうよ)
  - composer and arrangement: Akihito Tokunaga
3. Ashita wo Yume Mite (明日を夢見て) (original karaoke)
