= Hitomi Tojite =

Single by Zard

from the album Tomatteita Tokei ga Ima Ugokidashita
- Released: July 9, 2003
- Genre: Pop
- Label: B-Gram Records
- Songwriter(s): Izumi Sakai, Aika Ohno
- Producer(s): Daiko Nagato

Zard singles chronology
"Ashita wo Yume Mite" (2003)	"Hitomi Tojite" (2003)	"Motto Chikaku de Kimi no Yokogao Mitetai" (2003)

"Hitomi Tojite (瞳閉じて)" is the 36th single by Zard and released 9 July 2003 under B-Gram Records label. The single debuted at #4 rank first week. It charted for 7 weeks and sold over 44,000 copies.

== Track list ==
All songs are written by Izumi Sakai

1. Hitomi Tojite (瞳閉じて)
  - composer: Aika Ohno/arrangement: Akihito Tokunaga
    - the song was used in Fuji TV program Sport! as theme song
2. Itoshii Hito yo ~Mei mo naki Tabibito yo~ (愛しい人よ 〜名もなき旅人よ〜)
  - composer: Yuuichirou Iwai (U-ka Saegusa in dB)/arrangement: Yoshinobu Ohga
3. Hitomi Tojite (瞳閉じて) (original karaoke)
