= Field of View II =

Studio album by Field of View
- Released: October 2, 1996
- Recorded: 1996
- Genre: J-Pop
- Length: 46 minutes
- Label: Zain Records
- Producer: BMF

Field of View chronology
Field of View I (1995)	Field of View II (1996)	Singles Collection +4 (1997)

Singles from FIELD OF VIEW II
- 1. "Last Good-bye" Released: November 13, 1995; 2. "Dan Dan Kokoro Hikareteku" Released: March 11, 1996; 3. "Doki" Released: May 20, 1996

FIELD OF VIEW II is the second studio album by Japanese group Field of View. The album was released on October 2, 1996, by Zain Records. The album reached #4 on the Oricon chart for the first week with 167,230 sold copies. It charted for 11 weeks and sold 368,740 copies.

== Track listing ==
No.	Title	Lyrics	Music	Arrangement	Length
1.	"Rainy Day"	U-ya Asaoka; Kanako Oda	Yoshio Tatano	Akihito Tokunaga	3:58
2.	"Last Good-bye"	Izumi Sakai	Yoshio Tatano	Takeshi Hayama	3:48
3.	"Doki" (ドキッ)	Yuri Yamamoto	U-ya Asaoka	Takeshi Hayama	4:37
4.	"Growin' Love"	Kanako Oda	Yoshio Tatano	Akihito Tokunaga	3:55
5.	"Dan Dan Kokoro Hikareteku" (DAN DAN 心魅かれてく)	Izumi Sakai	Tetsurō Oda	Takeshi Hayama	3:35
6.	"Wake Up!!"	Emi Makiho	U-ya Asaoka	Akihito Tokunaga	3:31
7.	"Promise You"	U-ya Asaoka	U-ya Asaoka	Daisuke Ikeda	4:46
8.	"Believe Myself"	U-ya Asaoka	U-ya Asaoka	Akihito Tokunaga	3:57
9.	"Yume Mitsuzukete Ima mo" (夢見続けて今も)	U-ya Asaoka	U-ya Asaoka	Jun Abe	4:55
10.	"The Way of My Life"	U-ya Asaoka	U-ya Asaoka	Akihito Tokunaga	3:37
11.	"Kimi no Koe ga Kikitakute" (君の声が聴きたくて)	U-ya Asaoka	U-ya Asaoka	Daisuke Ikeda	5:11

== Usage in media ==
- Dan Dan Kokoro Hikareteku was used as the opening theme for the anime series Dragon Ball GT.
- Wake up was used in a commercial for the "Astel Kansai Corporation".
- Doki was used in a commercial for All Nippon Airways' "ANA's Paradise" promotion.
- Last Good-bye was used as the ending theme for the Tokyo Broadcasting System Television drama "Discovery of the World's Mysteries"

== Cover ==
Zard covered Last Good-bye on the album, Kimi to no Distance and Dan Dan Kokoro Hikareteku on the album, Today is Another Day.
