= Motto Chikaku de Kimi no Yokogao Mitetai =

Single by Zard

from the album Tomatteita Tokei ga Ima Ugokidashita
- Released: November 12, 2003
- Genre: Pop rock; soft rock
- Label: B-Gram Records
- Producer(s): Daiko Nagato

Zard singles chronology
"Hitomi Tojite" (2003)	"Motto Chikaku de Kimi no Yokogao Mitetai" (2003)	"Kakegae no Nai Mono" (2004)

"Motto Chikaku de Kimi no Yokogao Mitetai (もっと近くで君の横顔見ていたい)" is the 37th single by Zard and released 12 November 2003 under B-Gram Records label. The single debuted at #8 rank first week. It charted for 10 weeks and sold over 50,000 copies.

== Track list ==
All songs are written by Izumi Sakai

1. Motto Chikaku de Kimi no Yokogao Mitetai (もっと近くで君の横顔見ていたい)
  - composer: Aika Ohno/arrangement: Daisuke Ikeda
  - Aika Ohno was participating in chorus part
  - Takeshi Hayama re-arranged this song in 2012 in Zard Album collection (Premium Disc)
2. Reset (リセット)
  - composer: Makoto Miyoshi (ex. Rumania Montevideo)/arrangement: Satoru Kobayashi
3. Motto Chikaku de Kimi no Yokogao Mitetai (もっと近くで君の横顔見ていたい) (original karaoke)
