= Hagane (band) =

Japanese heavy metal band

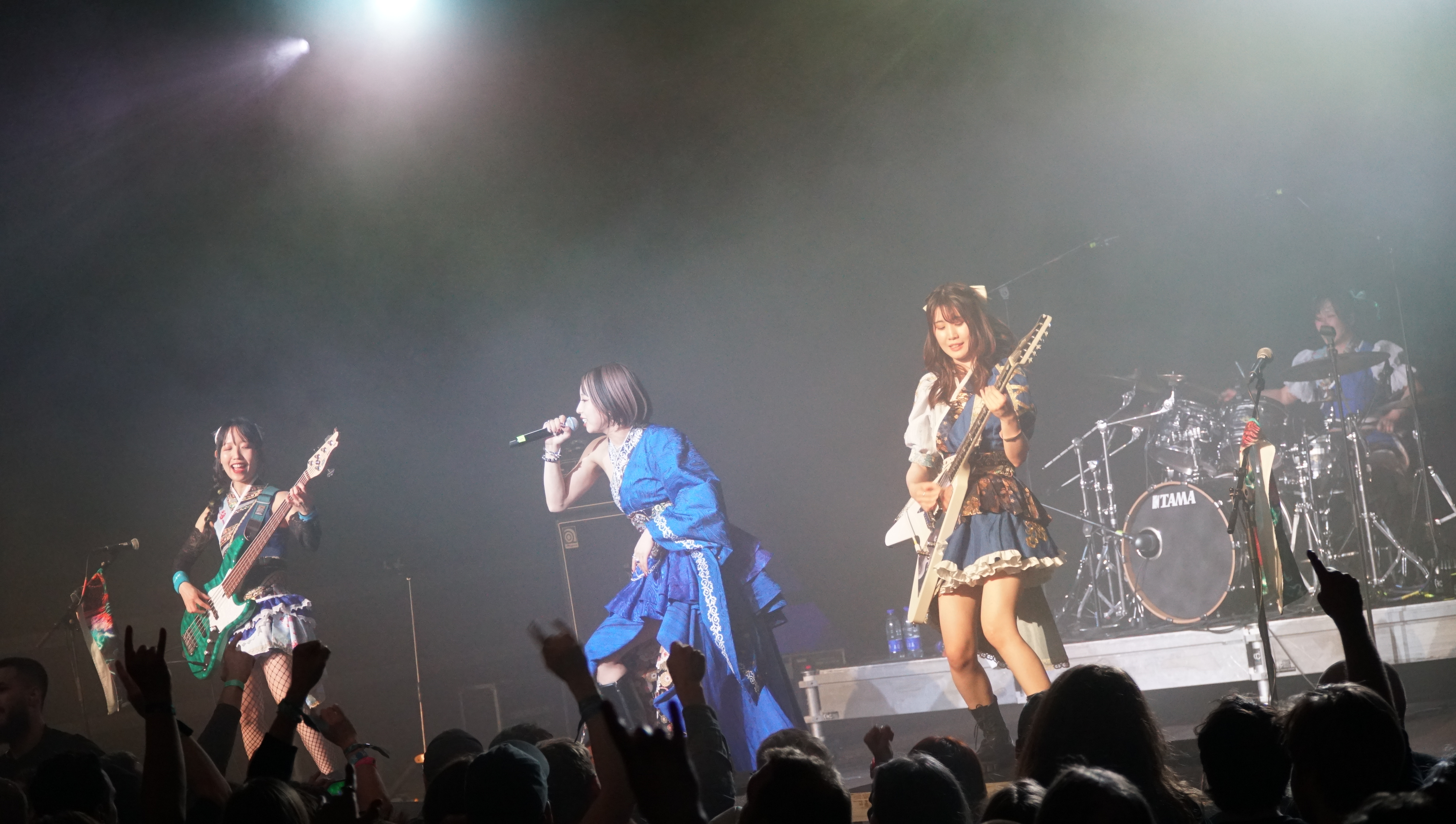

Background information
- Origin: Tokyo, Japan
- Genres: Heavy metal, power metal
- Years active: 2018–present
- Labels: Disk Union (2020–2023); Crimson (2024–present); Napalm Records (2026–present; physical distribution outside Japan)
- Members: Nagi; Sakura; Sayaka; Junna
- Past members: Chiemi; Uyu; Mayto.; Kanako
- Website: www.hagane-official.com

Hagane (stylized in all caps) is a Japanese all-female heavy metal band formed in Tokyo in 2018 by guitarist Sakura. Following the departure of three members in 2023, Sakura and bassist Sayaka rebuilt the group with vocalist Nagi and drummer Junna, and the four-member lineup resumed activities in 2024. Hagane has released two studio albums, Code; 9021 (2022) and Top of the Tower (2025), with a third album, Through the Night, scheduled for December 2026. The band expanded its live activities to Europe in 2026 and announced an international physical distribution agreement with Napalm Records and a European tour for 2027.

== History ==
=== Formation and first lineup (2018–2023) ===
HAGANE was formed in Tokyo on June 23, 2018, by guitarist Sakura, who recruited members through an online musician networking platform. The original lineup comprised Sakura, vocalist Chiemi, guitarist Mayto., and drummer Kanako.

Bassist Sayaka joined in January 2019. Chiemi left the band in March, and Uyu joined as vocalist in November of the same year. The name HAGANE, the Japanese word for “steel”, was chosen to represent strength developed through repeated challenges.

The band released its first mini-album, Episode Ø, in June 2020, followed by its first full-length album, Code; 9021, in August 2022.

In February 2023, HAGANE announced that Uyu, Mayto., and Kanako would leave after the band's concert at Shinjuku ReNY on May 26. Following their departure, Sakura and Sayaka continued the band and began recruiting new members.

=== New lineup and relaunch (2024) ===
In April 2024, vocalist Nagi and drummer JUNNA were announced as new members, establishing a four-member lineup with Sakura and Sayaka.

The reformed lineup released the EP Life Goes On! on May 29, 2024, and returned to the stage at Shibuya ReX on June 27.

From September to December, HAGANE conducted the Phoenix Journey 2024 tour across several Japanese cities, concluding with a performance in Tokyo.

=== Top of the Tower and international expansion (2025–present) ===
HAGANE launched its official fan club, “Kenshi no Quest”, in February 2025. On April 30, the band released Top of the Tower, its first full-length album with the new lineup. A nationwide tour followed, concluding with a concert at Zepp Shinjuku in December 2025.

In 2026, HAGANE expanded its international activities, performing at Epic Fest in Denmark on April 11. The band held its eighth-anniversary concert, HAGANE 8th Anniversary Live PHOENIX ∞, at Liquidroom in Tokyo on June 23.

Between July 2 and 5, HAGANE performed at Rockharz in Germany, held the headlining concert HAGANE – Japanese Queens of Speed Metal at Privatclub in Berlin, and appeared at Rock Imperium Festival in Spain.

On July 9, the band released the EP METAL QUEST and the CD single Amour Chain.

In 2026, HAGANE announced their third studio album, Through the Night, scheduled for release in Japan on December 2, 2026. The band also announced a nationwide album release tour, concluding at Zepp DiverCity in Tokyo on February 19, 2027.

On September 30, 2026, HAGANE announced a worldwide physical distribution agreement with Austrian metal label Napalm Records, excluding Japan. Under the agreement, Through the Night is scheduled for an international physical release on January 15, 2027, in CD and vinyl formats.

The band also announced four European performances for April 2027, including an appearance at Epic Fest in Roskilde, Denmark, followed by concerts in Berlin, Hamburg and Cologne, Germany.

== Musical style ==
BURRN! Online characterized HAGANE's early sound as catchy, orthodox melodic metal, while BraveWords has described the group as a power metal act. The band's official profile identifies HAGANE as a melodic speed metal band; earlier in its career, the group used the self-description "harmonic metal".

During the original five-member lineup, the band's arrangements frequently featured twin-guitar exchanges and harmonies between guitarists Sakura and Mayto. Mayto described these elements as a recurring feature of HAGANE's music, including guitar battles and harmonized solos. After HAGANE re-formed as a four-piece in 2024, Sakura said that the band intended to pursue a more aggressive and pronounced melodic speed metal direction, and that JUNNA was recruited partly for her ability to perform faster material.

Beginning with "Tenkagoken" on the 2024 EP Life Goes On!, HAGANE began incorporating Japanese-inspired elements more prominently into its melodic metal sound. Sakura described it as the band's first song to fully realize a Japanese-style direction and said that its positive reception encouraged the group to develop the approach further on "Kagome". Based on the traditional children's song "Kagome Kagome", "Kagome" was characterized by GekiRock as dark Japanese-style metal with a Japanese-horror atmosphere; JUNNA said that its drumming incorporates a taiko-like nuance. The band has also explored 1980s hard rock. GekiRock described "Black Diamond" as an orthodox hard rock song recalling 1980s Los Angeles metal, with its rhythm guitar, guitar solo, and synthesizer arrangement reflecting that style.

Members of the original lineup cited musical influences and admired artists including Helloween, Rhapsody of Fire, DragonForce, X Japan, Judas Priest, Gary Moore, Michael Schenker, and Dream Theater. Sakura has also cited Japanese all-female metal bands including Mary's Blood, Aldious, and Bridear, as well as anime music and video game soundtracks, as influences. She identified the soundtrack to Sonic Adventure as an early influence and said that "GoGoKart" was composed with the Sonic the Hedgehog series in mind. Vocalist Nagi has cited Motoki Omori of Mrs. Green Apple and Misia as her principal vocal influences.

== Reception ==
Specialist rock and heavy metal publications have reviewed HAGANE's recordings. Reviewing the band's first full-length album, Code; 9021, GekiRock praised its detailed arrangements, delicate melodies, and musical scale, stating that the album extended beyond the group's self-described "harmonic metal" classification. The publication later praised the quality and variety of Top of the Tower, highlighting the contrasting styles of "Not Lose", "Kagome", "Salvation", and "Heart Scream".

Katarina McGinn of the international metal webzine Dead Rhetoric rated Top of the Tower 9.5 out of 10. She praised its combination of technical guitar playing, melodic accessibility, and stylistic variety, concluding that the band was able to work beyond the conventional boundaries of power metal.

The re-formed four-member lineup also received positive live reviews. Reporting on the final concert of the Phoenix Journey 2024 tour, BARKS wrote that the lineup had already established an assured identity, highlighted Nagi's high-register vocals, and stated that all four members could be regarded as front performers. In its report on the band's 2025 tour finale at Zepp Shinjuku, GekiRock praised the individual performances of the four members and described the album and concert as representing a new high point for the band.

In March 2025, HAGANE appeared on the cover of Metallion Vol. 81, a special issue of BURRN!, and was featured as its lead story in connection with the release of Top of the Tower.

== Band members ==
Hagane at Rockharz 2026

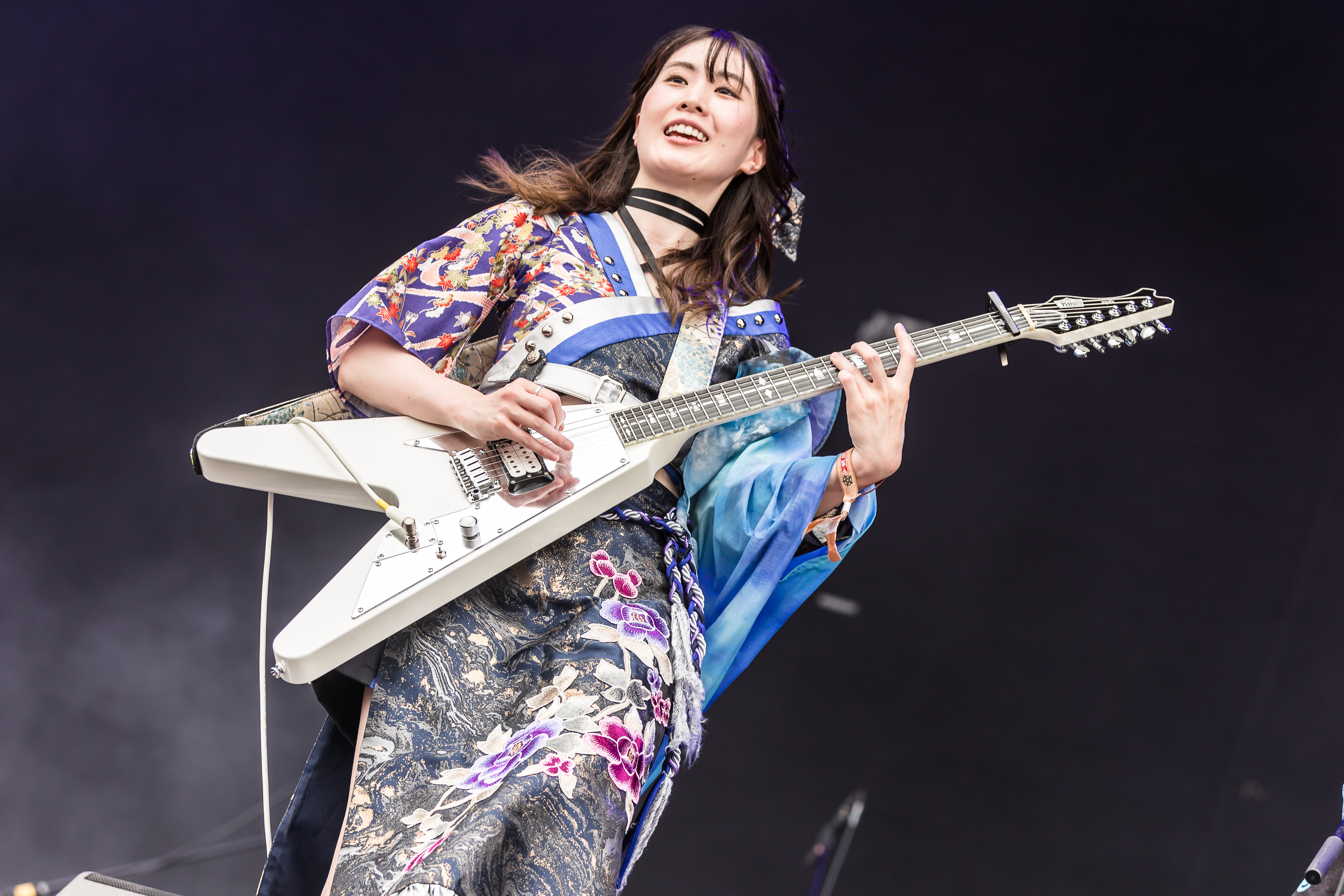
Sakura, guitars

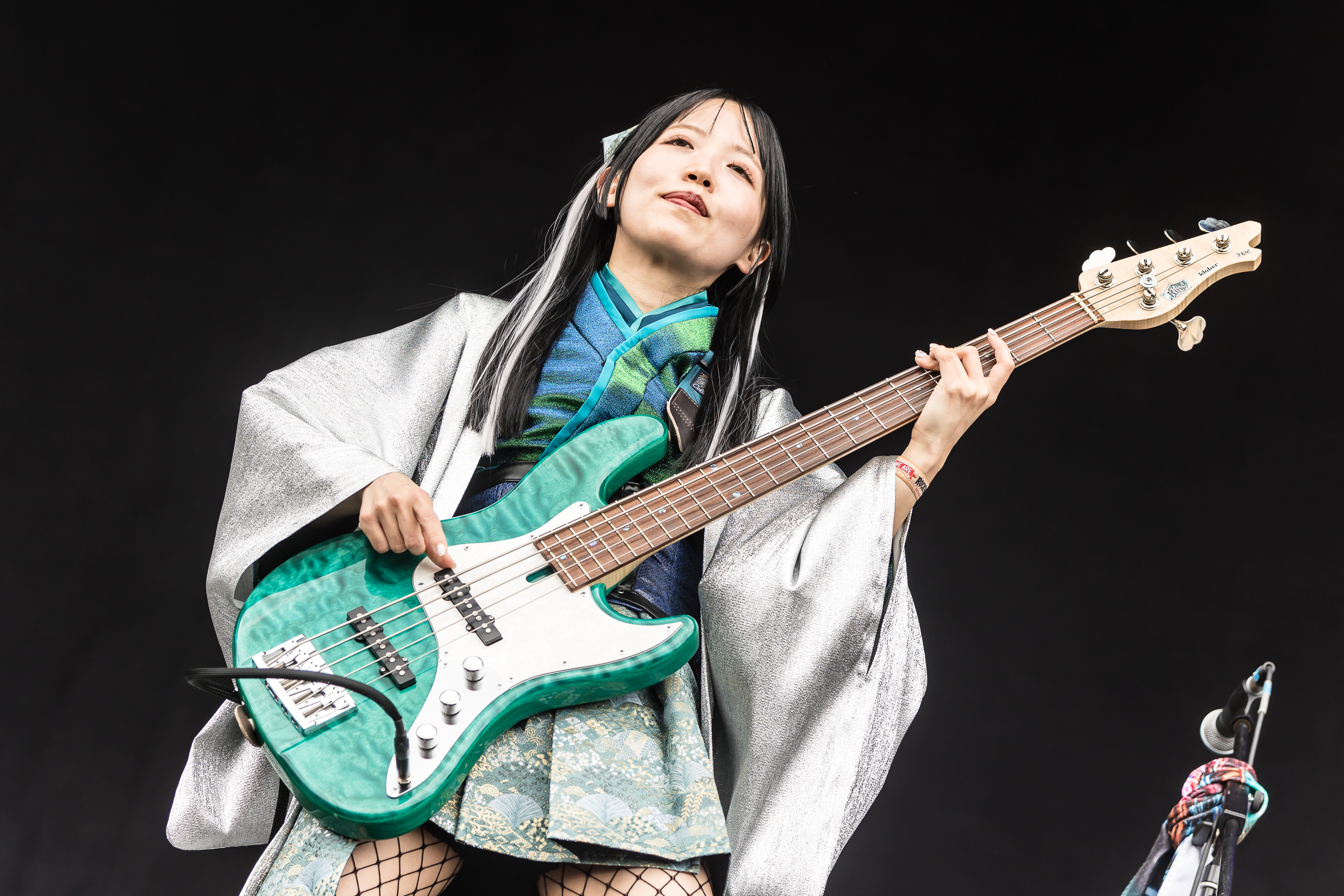
Sayaka, bass

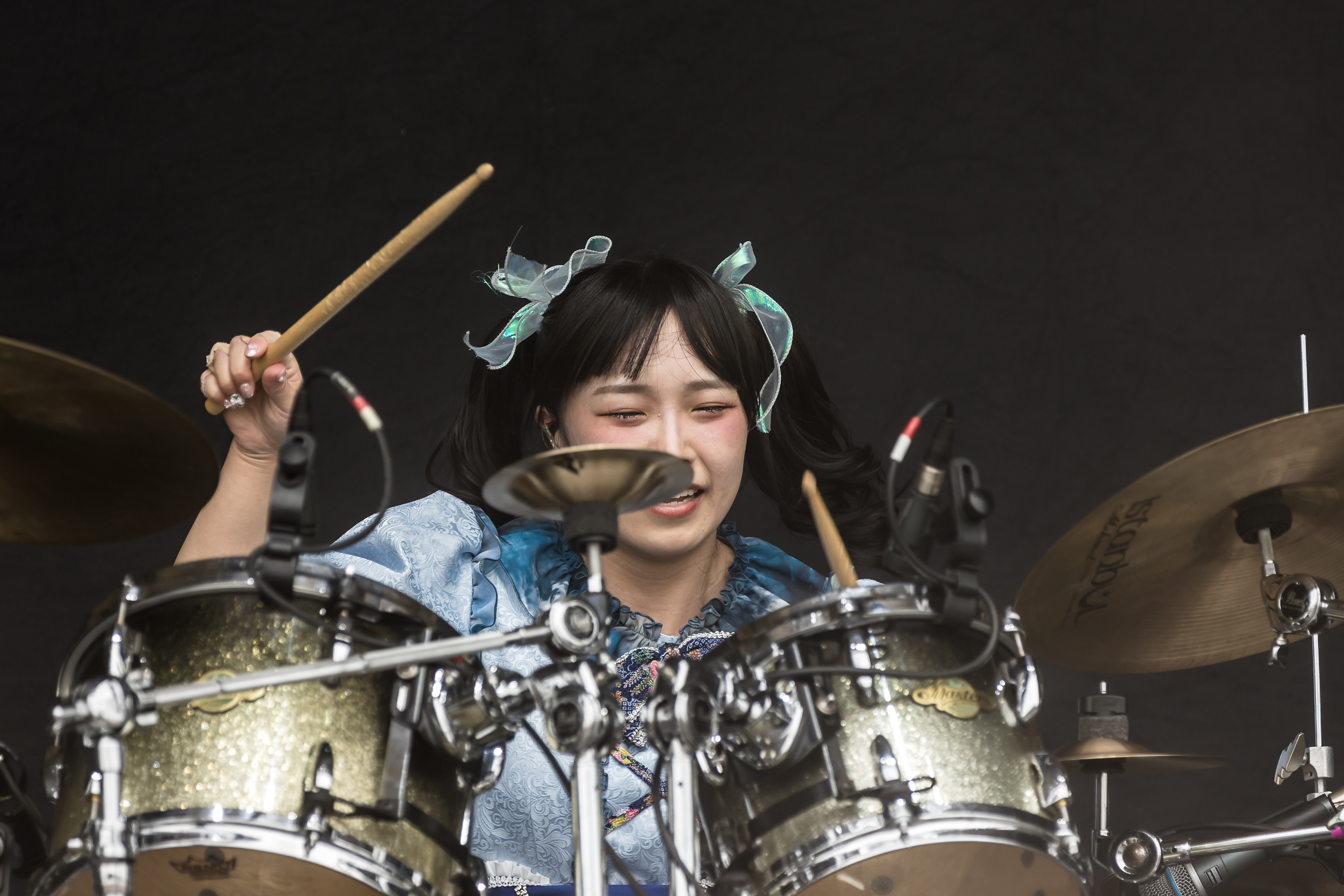
Junna, drums

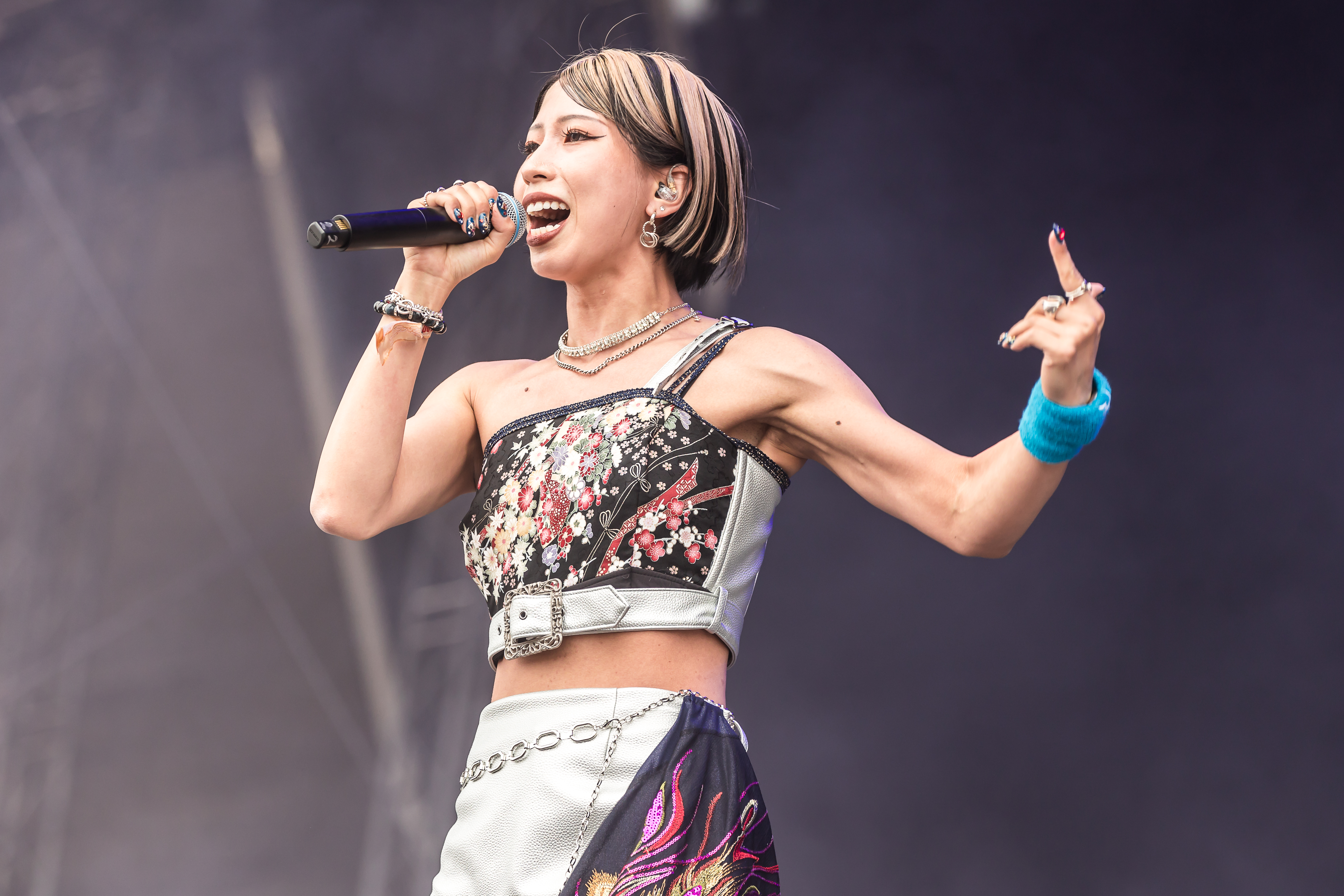
Nagi, vocals

Current members

- Nagi – lead vocals (2024–present)
- Sakura – guitar (2018–present)
- Sayaka – bass guitar (2019–present)
- JUNNA – drums (2024–present)

Former members

- Chiemi – lead vocals (2018–2019)
- Uyu – lead vocals (2019–2023)
- Mayto. – guitar (2018–2023)
- Kanako – drums (2018–2023)

== Discography ==
=== Studio albums ===
Release date	Title	Label	Notes
18 August 2022	Code; 9021	Disk Union	Released in regular and special editions; the special edition includes three additional acoustic recordings.
30 April 2025	Top of the Tower	Crimson	Peaked at No. 28 on the Oricon Albums Chart and charted for five weeks.
2 December 2026 (scheduled)	Through the Night	Crimson; Napalm Records (international physical distribution)	International physical release scheduled for 15 January 2027

=== EPs ===
Release date	Title	Format	Label	Notes
23 June 2020	Episode Ø	CD, digital	Disk Union	
29 May 2024	Life Goes On!	Digital, CD	Crimson	Released digitally on May 29. The CD edition was first sold at concerts on June 27 and received a general retail release on August 22.
9 July 2026	Metal Quest	CD, digital	Crimson	

=== Singles ===
Release date	Title	Format	Label	Notes
8 December 2020	"Labradorite"	CD, digital	Disk Union	Peaked at No. 47 on the Oricon Singles Chart and charted for two weeks.
18 December 2021	"SuperVillan"	CD, digital	Disk Union	
13 December 2024	"Start Our Journey"	Digital	Crimson	
12 November 2025; 9 July 2026	"Amour Chain"	Digital, CD	Crimson	Opening theme for the Nintendo Switch game Crazy Cha!n: Elpis no Kusari. The CD also includes the game's ending theme, "Avenir".
26 February 2026	"Black Diamond"	Digital	Crimson	
23 April 2026	"We are The Knight"	Digital	Crimson	

=== Video albums ===
Release date	Title	Format	Label	Notes
27 March 2020	HAGANE ONEMAN No-Audience Live Chapter 1: Koko kara Hajimaru	DVD	HAGANE	
23 May 2021	2020.12.19 HAGANE ONEMAN LIVE Chapter 2: Dōkutsu to Gensōseki	DVD	HAGANE	
18 May 2022	2021.10.16 HAGANE ONE MAN LIVE Chapter 3: Tsukuyomi no Toki	DVD	HAGANE	The band's official site lists May 18 as the release date; Oricon lists the general retail release as June 18. Peaked at No. 20 on the Oricon DVD Chart and charted for two weeks.
20 May 2026	HAGANE Full Album Release Tour "Top of the Tower" at Zepp Shinjuku 2025.12.25	Blu-ray and two CDs	Crimson	Peaked at No. 9 on the Oricon Blu-ray Chart and charted for seven weeks.
