= Breakerz =

Japanese rock band

- Also known as: BRZ
- Origin: Japan
- Genres: Rock, pop rock
- Years active: 2006-present
- Label: Zain Records (2006–present)
- Members: Daigo; Akihide; Shinpei
- Website: breakerz-web.net

YouTube information
- Channel: BREAKERZ
- Years active: 2005–present
- Subscribers: 42.2 thousand
- Views: 15 million
- Last updated: August 4, 2026

Breakerz (Japanese: ブレイカーズ, Hepburn: Bureikazu) is a Japanese visual kei rock band formed in 2006. The origin of the band name comes from the English word "breakers", with a backwards S written as a Z.

== Career ==
Before the band's formation, each of the members had already been active with their music as a soloist (Daigo) or as a member of an independent band (Akihide, Shinpei). The band was formed in 2006 with the vocalist Daigo and guitarist Shinpei; Akihide joined them soon afterwards. In 2007, they made their debut with the release of the self-titled full-length album Breakerz, released under Zain Records. The album failed to chart on the Oricon Weekly charts.

In 2008, their third studio album, Big Bang, appeared on the Oricon Weekly Charts. It became their first original album to debut in the Top 10. The Japanese version of the film Wanted used the song "Daigo" by Breakerz as its ending theme. In 2009, their fifth single, "Everlasting Luv", became their first single to be used as a theme song to an anime television series, Case Closed. The single debuted at number 2 on the Oricon Weekly Charts. In the same year, they held their first concert tour, beginning with their first live concert at the Nippon Budokan.

In 2012, Shinpei established his own rock band, Muscle Attack, with Shinpei as the main vocalist. In 2013, Akihide launched his solo career. In 2015, their 16th single, "Yaiba", became the theme song for the anime series Cardfight!! Vanguard G. In 2017, they commemorated their 10th anniversary. For the commemoration promotion, they released a special collaboration album X (Cross), in which they collaborated with artists including singer-songwriter Mai Kuraki, Jiro from Glay, and Sho Kiryuin from Golden Bomber. In January 2018, they announced a double A-side single, "D×D×D / Great Ambitios -Single Version-" which was released on 7 March. On 30 April 2019, on the last day of the Heisei era, they released a digital single, "Atarashii Sekai He Atarashii Jidai He: Reiwa version".

For their seventh album, 2021's With You, Kuraki was once again a guest vocalist.

== Members ==
- Daigo (Real name: Daigo Naito (内藤 大湖, Naitō Daigo), born 8 April 1978) – vocals, piano, lyrics, composer
- Akihide (Real name: Akihide Sato (佐藤 彰秀, Satō Akihide), born 5 July 1977) – guitar, chorus, synthesizer, lyricist, composer, arranger
- Shinpei (Real name: Shinpei Inoue (井上 慎平, Inoue Shinpei), born 11 May 1981) – guitar, chorus, synthesizer, lyricist, composer, arranger

== Discography ==
As of 2024, the band had released eight studio albums, two EPs, three compilation albums, one collaboration album, twenty-three singles, three digital singles, and ten video albums.

=== Albums ===
Title	Album details	Peak chart positions
Title	Album details	JPN Oricon
Breakerz	Released: 25 July 2007; Label: Zain Records; Formats: CD, download, streaming	—
Crash & Build	Released: 25 December 2007; Label: Zain Records; Formats: CD, digital download, streaming	300
Big Bang!	Released: 26 November 2008; Label: Zain Records; Formats: CD, CD+DVD, CD+photobook, digital download, streaming	8
Fighterz	Released: 2 December 2009; Label: Zain Records; Formats: CD, CD+DVD, digital download, streaming	7
Go	Released: 9 September 2011; Label: Zain Records; Formats: CD, CD+DVD, digital download, streaming	4
Ø -ZERO-	Released: 29 July 2015; Label: Zain Records; Formats: CD, CD+DVD, digital download, streaming	13
With You	Released: 29 August 2021; Label: Zain Records; Formats: CD, CD+DVD, digital download, streaming	26
Bintage	Released: 24 July 2024; Label: Zain Records; Formats: CD, CD+Blu-ray, download, streaming	19

==== Collaborations ====
Title	Album details	Peak chart positions
Title	Album details	JPN Oricon
X (Cross)	Released: 1 January 2012; Label: Zain Records; Formats: 2CD+2DVD, 2CD+1DVD, 2CD, download, streaming	12

==== EPs ====
Title	Album details	Peak chart positions
Title	Album details	JPN Oricon
Ao no Mirai (アオノミライ)	Released: 2 April 2008; Label: Zain Records; Formats: CD download, streaming	123
B.R.Z ACOUSTIC	Released: 7 April 2010; Label: Zain Records; Formats: CD, CD+DVD	9

==== Compilations ====
Title	Album details	Peak chart positions
Title	Album details	JPN Oricon
BREAKERZ BEST: SINGLE COLLECTION	Released: 1 January 2012; Label: Zain Records; Formats: 2CD+2DVD, 3CD, 2CD, download, streaming	5
BREAKERZ×Meitantei Conan COLLABORATION BEST	Released: 18 December 2019; Label: Zain Records; Formats: CD	29
BREAKERZ BEST: SINGLEZ-	Released: 15 June 2022; Label: Zain Records; Formats: 2CD, 2CD+1 Blu-Ray	15

=== Singles ===
Year	Single	Formats	
Year	Single	Formats	JPN Physical
2008	"SUMMER PARTY／LAST EMOTION"	CD, CD+DVD, digital download, streaming	10
2008	"Sekai wa Odoru/Shakunetsu" (世界は踊る／灼熱)	CD, CD+DVD, digital download, streaming	6
2008	"Angelic Smile／WINTER PARTY"	CD, CD+DVD, digital download, streaming	9
2009	"GRAND FINALE"	CD, CD+DVD, digital download, streaming	6
2009	"Everlasting Luv／Bambino"	CD, CD+DVD, digital download, streaming	2
2009	"Hikari" (光)	CD, CD+DVD, digital download, streaming	6
2009	"Love Fighter: Koi no Battle" (〜恋のバトル〜)	CD, CD+DVD, digital download, streaming	5
2010	"BUNNY LOVE/REAL LOVE 2010"	CD, CD+DVD, digital download, streaming	4
2010	"Tsukiyo no Akugi no Mahō/ClimberxClimber " (月夜の悪戯の魔法)	CD, CD+DVD, digital download, streaming	5
2011	"Last Pray/Zettai I Love You" (絶対! I LOVE YOU)	CD, CD+DVD, digital download, streaming	8
2012	"Miss Mystery"	CD, CD+DVD, digital download, streaming	5
2012	"Overwrite/Nōnai Survivor" (オーバーライト／脳内Survivor)	CD, CD+DVD, digital download, streaming	5
2013	"Rusty Hearts"	CD, CD+DVD, digital download, streaming	6
2015	"We Go"	CD, CD+DVD, CD+Photobook, digital download, streaming	9
2015	"Yaiba"	CD, CD+DVD, digital download, streaming	12
2017	"Ikusen no Meikyū de Ikusen no Nazo o Hodoite" (幾千の迷宮で 幾千の謎を解いて)	CD, CD+DVD, digital download, streaming	9
2017	"Yume Monogatari" (夢物語)	CD, CD+DVD, digital download, streaming	10
2018	"D×D×D／GREAT AMBITIOUS"	CD, CD+DVD, digital download, streaming	13
2019	"Yamiyo ni Mau Aoi Tori" (闇夜に舞う青い鳥)	CD, CD+DVD, CD+photobook, digital download, streaming	10
2019	"Atarashii Sekai Atarashii Jidai he: Reiwa Version" (新しい世界へ 新しい時代へ 〜令和Version〜)	digital download	-
2020	"BARABARA／LOVE STAGE"	CD, 1CD+3DVD, digital download, streaming	20
2021	"I love my daughter"	CD, 2CD+2DVD, digital download, streaming	20
2022	"SWEET MOONLIGHT"	CD, 1CD+3DVD, digital download, streaming	9

=== Video albums ===
Title	Album details	Peak chart positions
Title	Album details	JPN Oricon
BREAKERZ LIVE 2009 “WISH”in Nippon Budokan	Released: 14 October 2009; Label: Zain Records; Formats: DVD	4
BREAKERZ LIVE TOUR 2009～2010 “FIGHTERZ”	Released: 26 May 2010; Label: Zain Records; Formats: DVD	26
BREAKERZ LIVE 2010 “WISH” 02 in Nippon Budokan	Released: 9 February 2011; Label: Zain Records; Formats: DVD	8
BREAKERZ LIVE 2011 “WISH” 03 in Nippon Budokan	Released: 28 March 2012; Label: Zain Records; Formats: DVD	32
BREAKERZ LIVE TOUR 2011"GO"	Released: 28 March 2012; Label: Zain Records; Formats: DVD	-
BREAKERZ LIVE 2012 “WISH” 4U in Nippon Budokan	Released: 26 December 2012; Label: Zain Records; Formats: DVD	35
BREAKERZ LIVE TOUR 2012～2013 “BEST” -LIVE HOUSE COLLECTION- & -HALL COLLECTION- COMPLETE BOX	Released: 23 July 2014; Label: Zain Records; Formats: DVD	26
BREAKERZ Debut 10 Anniversary Live BREAKERZ X COMPLETE BOX	Released: 23 May 2018; Label: Zain Records; Formats: DVD	25
BREAKERZ Debut 15 Anniversary Live BREAKERZ XV CRYSTAL	Released: 23 May 2022; Label: Zain Records; Formats: Blu-ray	25

== Tours ==
- Summer Party (2008)
- Big Bang! (2008)
- Grande Finale: Seishun Days (2009)
- Fighters (2009–2010)
- Go (2011)
- Best (2012–2013)
- Zero (2015)
