= Renka (singer) =

Japanese singer and songwriter

Renka 蓮花
- Born: Tokyo, Japan
- Genres: J-pop; Anime song
- Occupations: singer; songwriter; radio personality
- Years active: 2015-present (currently under hiatus)
- Labels: Being
- Website: renka-web.com

YouTube information
- Channel: 蓮花
- Years active: 2015 - 2020
- Subscribers: 6.13 thousand
- Views: 1.3 million
- Last updated: 15 January 2024

Renka (蓮花) is a Japanese pop singer and songwriter under the Being label.

== Biography ==
She made her major debut in April 2015 with the single "if ~Hitori Omou~" which was used as the theme song for the game Fire Emblem Fates. In the game itself, she provides the singing voice for the character Azura.

Renka shares very little information through her social networks and official website. She hides her identity, using only her stage name. She has not yet made any TV or visual media appearances, instead working as a radio personality at various radio stations and her own radio Renka Voice....

In August 2017 Renka collaborated with Vocaloid Producer Doriko on his compilation album Doriko 10th anniversary tribute with the song Anata no Negai wo Utau mono (あなたの願いを歌うもの).

In October 2017 Renka wrote lyrics for Character Song CD from Anime television series Nobunaga no Shinobi.

In June 2018, Renka participated as a guest vocalist in recording of Akihide's album Kikai Jikake no Yuenchi -Electric Wonderland- track My Little Clock.

On 23 January 2019, Renka released first studio album Hoshi no Habataku Yoru wa.

In March 2021, Renka announced hiatus from her music activities through official website. At the same time, two previously unreleased songs were published as a digital single.

== Discography ==
=== Singles ===
No.	Release Day	Title	Music production	Rank	Format
1st	2015/7/13	if ~Hitori Omou~ (if～ひとり思う～)	lyricist: Kohei Maeda, Renka composer: Morishita Hirosei, Toshinari Ohnishi, Shisui Ichisato arranger: Hirosei, Hirohito Furui (ex.Garnet Crow), Ohnishi, Daisuke Ikeda	20	CD (JBCZ-4017), CD+DVD (JBCZ-4016), digital download
2nd	2016/03/21	Don't Cry	lyricst: Renka composer: Toshinari Ohnishi, Hiya & Katsuma, Yoshifumi Kouchi arranger: Ohnishi, Hirohito Furui, Daisuke Ikeda	72	CD (JBCZ-4021), CD+DVD (JBCZ-4020), digital download
1st digital	2016/11/08	Adazakura (徒桜)	lyricist: Renka composer: Nagami Kazuya		digital download
3rd	2017/05/10	Shirayuki (白雪)	lyricist: Renka composer: Nagami Kazuya, Tomoari Taguma, Toshinari Ohnishi arranger: Kazuya, Akira Onozuka (Dimension), Ohnishi, Kazuhiro Takemoto	66	CD (JBCZ-4033), CD+DVD (JBCZ-4032), digital download
4th	2018/05/30	Kingyo Namida (金魚涙。)	lyricist: Renka composer: Nagami Kazuya, Tsukada Takashige, Meguro Ryoko, Taguma Tomonari arranger: Kazuya, Ikeda Daisuke, Takashige, Toyoda Minoru, Yoshida Takashi	103	CD (JBCZ-4044), digital download
2nd digital	2020/03/4	Wasurenagusa (ワスレナグサ)			digital download
3rd digital	2021/03/30	Epilogue/Rain			digital download

=== Studio album ===
	Release Day	Title	Rank	Format
1st	2019/01/23	Hoshi no Habataku Yoru wa (星の羽ばたく夜は)	81	CD, CD+DVD

=== Collaboration album ===
Release Day	Title	Track	Rank	Format
2017/8/30	Doriko 10th anniversary tribute	#4 Anata no Negai wo Utau mono (あなたの願いを歌うもの)	68	CD (JBCZ-9061)

== In media ==
- if ~Hitori Omou~: theme song for Nintendo 3DS game Fire Emblem Fates.
- Don't Cry: ending theme for the Anime television series Hakuōki Otogisōshi.
- Adazakura: opening theme for Anime television series Nobunaga no Shinobi.
- Shirayuki: opening song for Anime television series Nobunaga no Shinobi 2nd season.
- Kingyo Namida: opening theme for Anime television series Nobunaga no Shinobi 3rd season.
