= Capsule Monster =

Studio album by Field of View
- Released: March 29, 2000
- Recorded: 2000
- Genre: J-Pop
- Length: 50:38
- Label: Nippon Columbia
- Producer: BMF

Field of View chronology
Lovely Jubbly (1999)	Capsule Monster (2000)	Field of View Best: Fifteen Colours (2000)

Singles from Capsule Monster
- 1. "Fuyu no Parade" Released: December 22, 1999; 2. "Beautiful day" Released: February 23, 2000

Capsule Monster is the fifth and last original studio album by Japanese band Field of View. It was released on March 29, 2000, through Nippon Columbia.

The album consist of two previously released singles: Fuyu no Ballad and Beautiful Day. The album reached #43 on the Oricon charts for first week with 8,730 sold copies. It charted for 2 weeks and sold more than 12,000 copies. Before disband, they release two compilation albums.

== Track listing ==
No.	Title	Lyrics	Music	Arranger(s)	Length
1.	"Specially"	U-ya Asaoka	Yoshio Tatano	Field of View	4:37
2.	"Kiseki no Hana" (奇跡の花)	U-ya Asaoka	Takeshi Oda, U-ya Asaoka	Daisuke Ikeda, Field of View	4:17
3.	"Ai no Kakera" (愛のカケラ)	U-ya Asaoka	Takeshi Oda	Field of View	4:49
4.	"Tomorrow"	U-ya Asaoka	Kenji Niitsu	Izumi Takanori	4:26
5.	"Fuyu no Parade" (冬のバラード)	Kanako Oda	Yoshio Tatano	Daisuke Ikeda	4:26
6.	"Bokura wa Mou Ichido Yari Naoseru kara" (僕らはもう一度やり直せるから)	U-ya Asaoka	U-ya Asaoka	D-Style	4:50
7.	"I want..."	U-ya Asaoka	Takuto Kohashi	Akihito Tokunaga and FIELD OF VIEW	5:09
8.	"Sayonara to Aozora" (サ・ヨ・ナ・ラとア・オ・ゾ・ラ)	U-ya Asaoka	U-ya Asaoka	Daisuke Ikeda and FIELD OF VIEW	3:55
9.	"Kodou" (鼓動)	U-ya Asaoka	Takuto Kohashi	Daisuke Ikeda and FIELD OF VIEW	4:49
10.	"Natsu no Ame" (夏の雨)	U-ya Asaoka	Takeshi Oda	FIELD OF VIEW	4:01
11.	"Beautiful day"	U-ya Asaoka	Hiroshi Terao	Daisuke Ikeda and FIELD OF VIEW	4:01

== In media ==
- Fuyu no Ballad was used as the ending theme for the Tokyo Broadcasting System Television program Kokoro no Tobira.
- Beautiful Day was used as the opening theme for the Yomiuri program Shuffle.
  - In addition, it was also used as the ending theme for the FM Osaka program Sound Walk.
