= Field of View III ~Now Here No Where~ =

Studio album by Field of View
- Released: September 30, 1998
- Recorded: 1998
- Genre: J-Pop
- Length: 44 minutes
- Label: Zain Records
- Producer: BMF

Field of View chronology
Singles Collection +4 (1997)	Field of View III; ~Now Here No Where~ (1998)	Lovely Jubbly (1999)

Singles from FIELD OF VIEW III ~NOW HERE NO WHERE~
- 1. "Kawaita Sakebi" Released: May 20, 1998; 2. "Meguru Kisetsu wo Koete" Released: July 29, 1998; 3. "Kimi wo Terasu Taiyou ni" Released: September 23, 1998

Field of View III ~Now Here No Where~ is the third studio album by Japanese group Field of View. The album was released on September 30, 1998 by Zain Records. The album reached #13 on the Oricon chart for first week with 32,790 sold copies. It charted for 4 weeks and sold 49,940 copies.

== Track listing ==
No.	Title	Lyrics	Music	Arranger(s)	Length
1.	"Kaze yo" (風よ)	U-ya Asaoka	Takuto Kohashi	Daisuke Ikeda; Field of View	3:58
2.	"Owaranai Koi ~Hitotsu ni naru~" (終わらない恋〜ひとつになれ)	U-ya Asaoka	Kenji Niitsu	Field of View	3:48
3.	"Kawaita Sakebi" (渇いた叫び)	Miho Komatsu	Miho Komatsu	Masazumi Ozawa (Pamelah)	4:37
4.	"Kimi wo Terasu Taiyou ni" (君を照らす太陽に)	U-ya Asaoka	Takashi Oda	Daisuke Ikeda; Field of View	3:55
5.	"everywhere"	U-ya Asaoka	Takuto Kohashi	Daisuke Ikeda; Field of View	3:35
6.	"Kimi ga Inai dake" (君がいないだけ)	U-ya Asaoka	U-ya Asaoka	Field of View	3:31
7.	"Natural"	U-ya Asaoka	U-ya Asaoka	Daisuke Ikeda; Field of View	4:46
8.	"Omoidasu yo Kimi no Egao wo" (想い出すよ 君の笑顔を)	Kanako Oda	Kenji Niitsu	Daisuke Ikeda; Field of View	3:57
9.	"Nagareru Kumo" (ながれる雲)	Takuto Kohashi	Takuto Kohashi	Daisuke Ikeda; Field of View	4:55
10.	"I'm thinking a lot of you"	U-ya Asaoka	U-ya Asaoka	Daisuke Ikeda; Field of View	3:37
11.	"Meguru Kisetsu wo Koete" (めぐる季節を越えて)	U-ya Asaoka	U-ya Asaoka	Daisuke Ikeda; Field of View	5:11

== Usage in media ==
- Kawaita Sakebi was used as the opening theme for the 1998 anime adaptation of Yu-Gi-Oh!
- Meguru Kisetsu wo Koete was used as the ending theme for the Fuji TV program Unbelievable.
- Kimi wo Terasu Taiyou Ni was used as the ending theme for the Tokyo Broadcasting System Television program "Uwasa no! Tokyo Magazine".

== Cover ==
Miho Komatsu covered "Kawaita Sakebi" on her 6th studio album Hanano.
