= Glass Wings =

Japanese manga anthology

- Original cover of Glass Wings

羽根玻璃ノ君。 (Hane Garasu no Kimi)
- Genre: Romance, Fantasy
- Manga
- Written by: Misuzu Asaoka
- Published by: Kadokawa Shoten
- English publisher: NA: Tokyopop
- Published: December 17, 2003
- Volumes: 1

Glass Wings (Japanese: 羽根玻璃ノ君。, Hepburn: Hane Garasu no Kimi; lit. "Your Glass Wings") is a one-shot manga anthology by Misuzu Asaoka. Kadokawa Shoten originally published it in Japan on December 17, 2003, under the Asuka Comics label. Tokyopop released it in the United States on February 7, 2006. In 2005, they also released it in Germany under the title Der Prinz mit den gläsernen Schwingen (The Prince with Wings of Glass). Asaoka noted that she prefers her character designs to look both attractive and intelligent, and that she put more effort into developing some characters' bodies than their faces . Glass Wings has received several primarily negative reviews from Western critics.

The anthology is a collection of three gothic love stories; the first and titular story "Glass Wings" spans three chapters, while the other two are each one chapter long. The first story revolves around the relationship between two siblings, and their quest to leave their past lives and their cruel mother behind. The second story, "Firefly", involves a young demon boy's struggle to refrain from eating human flesh as is common among his kind. He leaves his clan and is immediately accepted into a village that is oblivious to his identity, his clan continues to track him. The final story, "Jion Princess", tells the story of a young orphan who becomes a scapegoat for a wealthy girl, Yura; she is beaten to keep Yura healthy, and blamed when Yura suffers.

== Plot ==
"Glass Wings" is the story of Hagane, a boy with "Death Blood" that kills anyone who touches it. He is forced into a relationship with a woman named Tsubaki, but soon meets a girl named Ruriha, to whom he is immediately drawn. It is revealed that Ruriha and Tsubaki have Death Blood as well and that Tsubaki is Ruhiha and Hagane's mother. Hagane and Ruriha run away from Tsubaki. They face difficulties of interacting with other people, while Tsubaki looks for them. They are eventually captured by Tsubaki and taken to her palace, where Ruriha's calls wake Hagane from a drug induced stupor. Tsubaki throws Ruriha out a window and Hagane jumps after her. They fall into a lake and swim to shore, while Tsubaki angrily sets her palace on fire.

"Firefly" is the story of a young demon boy named Yuinne, who must eat corpses to survive. Additionally, the rules of his clan demand that they kill and eat humans. Yuinne chooses to not abide by these rules and to only eat creatures that died of natural causes. Upset with the members of his clan, Yuinne runs away. He meets a girl named Mia, who lets him stay in an unoccupied cottage in her village. Yuinne enjoys his time in the town, but struggles with his hunger for flesh. Nakiri, a member of his former clan, sets out to kill Yuinne for leaving. When Yuinne is seen eating the raw meat of a recently perished bird, the villagers realize that he is a demon and turn against him. Only Mia remains on his side, but she is soon killed by Nakiri. In response, Yuinne stabs him, whereupon Nakari promises to return and leaves Yuinne to mourn his loss. Mia's spirit appears to Yuinne, consoling him and advising him to stop blaming himself.

"Jion Princess" is the story of an orphan girl named Soyogi, who becomes a "yorimashi"—one that takes the pain and sickness from another—for a sick, wealthy girl named Yura. Soyogi looks almost exactly like Yura, which is why she is chosen to be Yura's yorimashi. Soyogi is treated cruelly by Yura, but does not mind it as Yura is the only one to treat her like a human. Yura visits her fiancé in a monastery, leaving Soyogi behind. After her return, Yura treats Soyogi more kindly. Confused by Yura's change and not believing her to be the same person she knew, Soyogi jumps from a window. While crying over Soyogi's body, Yura reveals that she did care about her.

== Production ==
Asaoka notes that she spent more time on developing Hagane and Ruriha's bodies than on their faces and that she usually likes her characters to look "intelligent" and "sexy", regardless of age or gender. She states that she had the ideal body in mind, but was unable to "draw it out precisely" at the time. She also notes that, when thinking of Tsubaki's youth, she imagined Tsubaki "having an affair with two men and suffering from this very passionate yet complicated love." She explains that "even someone like Tsubaki", considered "an abnormal mother", was stricken with "a very sad and tough past".

== Media ==
Glass Wings was first released on December 17, 2003, in Japan by Kadokawa Shoten under the Asuka Comics imprint. Tokyopop released the anthology in the United States and Canada on February 7, 2006, and in Germany in 2005, where it was entitled Der Prinz mit den gläsernen Schwingen ("The Prince with the Wings of Glass"). The anthology contains the three-chapter-long story "Glass Wings" and the one-chapter-long stories "Firefly" and "Jion Princess", all written and illustrated by Misuzu Asaoka. Hagane, the main character of "Glass Wings", is featured on the book's cover. Glass Wings is currently out of print in North America. In Japan, the book is currently out of stock and a second printing is pending.

== Reception ==
Glass Wings was listed as 91 on ICv2's "Top 300 Graphic Novels" list for January 2006, which recorded the estimated sales of American comic distributor Diamond to comic stores.

Glass Wings has received several primarily negative reviews from English-speaking audiences. Writing for IGN, A.E. Sparrow comments that the "stunning artwork will captivate" readers, but that the book suffers from "muddled dialogue" and sound-effect balloons that intrude on the book's flow. Julie Rosato of Mania praises the art of Glass Wings, though she notes that the "crammed pages made it hard to enjoy the character detail and almost impossible to appreciate the various emotional dynamics." She criticizes the Tsubaki plotline as "disjointed" and the conflicts as "un-relatable" because of the "fantastical-horror angle". She states that "too much about this book moves too fast, and with too little emotional impact", leaving the reader without concern for the characters, and therefore unaffected by the stories' tragic ends. School Library Journal's John Leighton states that "the artwork is overdone with each figure too stylized and each article of clothing bejeweled to the max." He concludes that Glass Wings "has promise but never really takes off." Wilma Jandoc and Jason S. Yadao, writing for Honolulu Star-Bulletin, noted it "offers such a visual overload that it's easy to lose track of what's happening" and that it "is difficult to discern the flow of action". Its bleak endings was cited as "even more difficult to digest".
