= Lovely Jubbly =

Studio album by Field of View
- Released: August 25, 1999
- Recorded: 1999
- Genre: J-Pop
- Length: 52 minutes
- Label: Zain Records
- Producer: BMF

Field of View chronology
Field of View III ~Now Here No Where~ (1998)	Lovely Jubbly (1999)	Capsule Monster (2000)

Singles from LOVELY JUBBLY
- 1. "Crash" Released: March 17, 1999; 2. "Aoi Kasa de" Released: May 19, 1999; 3. "Still" Released: July 28, 1999

Lovely Jubbly is the fourth studio album by Japanese group Field of View. The album was released on August 25, 1999 on Zain Records. The album reached #24 on the Oricon charts for first week and sold more than 15,350 copies. It charted for 2 weeks and sold more than 20,000 copies in total.

== Track listing ==
No.	Title	Lyrics	Music	Arranger(s)	Length
1.	"Still"	U-ya Asaoka	FIELD OF VIEW	Akihito Tokunaga and FIELD OF VIEW	4:10
2.	"Loversday"	U-ya Asaoka	U-ya Asaoka	Kosuke Oshima and FIELD OF VIEW	3:55
3.	"Natsu no Katasumi de (夏の片隅で)"	Kanako Oda	Kenji Niitsu	Daisuke Ikeda and FIELD OF VIEW	4:47
4.	"Aoi Kasa de (青い傘で)"	Nana Azuki	Aika Ōno	Akihito Tokunaga and FIELD OF VIEW	4:24
5.	"Kimi. (君。)"	U-ya Asaoka	Takashi Oda	Daisuke Ikeda and FIELD OF VIEW	3:29
6.	"Sunday morning"	U-ya Asaoka	Takuto Kohashi	Daisuke Ikeda and FIELD OF VIEW	4:28
7.	"Juunigatsu no Mahou (12月の魔法)"	U-ya Asaoka	U-ya Asaoka	Daisuke Ikeda and FIELD OF VIEW	4:14
8.	"Cloudysky"	U-ya Asaoka	Takashi Oda	Akihito Tokunaga and FIELD OF VIEW	3:14
9.	"Fly to Xxxx"	U-ya Asaoka	Takuto Kohashi	Kosuke Oshima and FIELD OF VIEW	4:02
10.	"CRASH"	Azuki	Masaaki Watanuki	Daisuke Ikeda	3:54
11.	"Time is gone"	U-ya Asaoka	Kenji Niitsu	Daisuke Ikeda and FIELD OF VIEW	11:18
