= T-Bolan =

Japanese rock band

- Also known as: T. Bolan
- Origin: Japan
- Genres: Pop rock; hard rock
- Years active: 1990–1999, 2012-2014, 2017-2026
- Labels: Rock It Records (1991–1992); Zain Records (1992–1999, 2012-2014, 2017-2026)
- Members: Arashi Moritomo; Kazuyoshi Aoki; Takeshi Gomi; Hirofumi Ueno
- Website: https://t-bolan.bzone.co.jp

YouTube information
- Channel: T-BOLAN
- Years active: 2019 -
- Subscribers: 24.8 thousand
- Views: 62 million
- Last updated: January 15, 2024

T-Bolan is a Japanese rock band which debuted in 1991. Its members are vocal Arashi Moritomo, drummer Kazuyoshi Aoki, guitarist Takeshi Gomi, and bassist Hirofumi Ueno. The name of this band was inspired by T. Rex and its vocalist Marc Bolan.

== Biography ==
The band was formed in 1990. Their 1991 song "Hanashitaku wa Nai" (lit. "I do not want to release you") became a hit song in the cable broadcast. After this success, the band released several hit songs and albums. Their 1993 song "Osaekirenai Kono Kimochi" (lit. "Inextinguishable This Heart") was used for the ending theme of Ichigo Hakusho (in which then-unknown Namie Amuro played a role). The single reached number 1 on the Japanese Oricon weekly charts, becoming their first number-one single. However, Moritomo suffered throat problems so his doctor advised that he should give up singing. Despite this, he was forced to perform a live concert on March 26, 1995. It became their last concert for the decade. After a long hiatus, the band officially disbanded in December 1999. In 2009, after nearly decade of treatment, Moritomo finally regained his voice, then started a solo career not under the band's same label, but by Avex. After hearing fans wishing for the group to reform however, Moritomo and the rest of T-Bolan agreed to reunite in late 2012 and are set to go on a nationwide tour of 16 cities beginning in October 2012. However the first attempt of reunion did not go well and the band went on hiatus for reasons of "each individual member walking their own paths". In 2017 the band has announced full resume of their music activities. They are active as of 2023.

== Members ==
- Arashi Morimoto (森友嵐士) - vocalist, lyricist, composer, arranger
- Takashi Gomi (五味孝氏) - guitarist, composer, arranger
- Hirofumi Ueno (上野博文) - bassist, arranger
- Kazuyoshi Aoki (青木和義) - drummer, leader, arranger

== Discography ==
=== Singles ===
	Release Day	Romaji title	Japanese title	Peak
1st	10 July 1991	Kanashimi ga Itai yo	悲しみが痛いよ	46
2nd	18 December 1991	Hanashitakuwanai	離したくはない	15
3rd	26 February 1992	Just Illusion		22
4th	27 May 1992	Sayonara kara Hajimeyou	サヨナラから始めよう	13
5th	22 September 1992	Jirettai Ai	じれったい愛	2
6th	18 November 1992	Bye for Now		2
7th	10 February 1993	Osaekirenai Kono Kimochi	おさえきれない この気持ち	1
8th	10 March 1993	Surechigai no Junjou	すれ違いの純情	2
9th	16 June 1993	Setsunasa wo Keseyashinai/Kizu darake wo Dakishimete	刹那さを消せやしない/傷だらけを抱きしめて	1
10th	10 November 1993	Wagamama ni Dakiaetanara	わがままに抱き合えたなら	3
11th	11 May 1994	Love		3
12th	5 September 1994	Maria		3
13th	28 August 1995	Shake It		4
14th	20 November 1995	Ai no Tame ni Ai no Naka de	愛のために 愛の中で	2
15th	25 March 1996	Be Myself/Heart of Gold 1996		10
16th	26 November 1998	Jirettai Ai '98	じれったい愛 '98	26

=== Studio albums ===
	Release Day	Title	Peak
1st	21 November 1991	T-Bolan	19
2nd	22 April 1992	Baby Blue	4
3rd	11 November 1992	So Bad	3
4th	26 May 1993	Heart of Stone	1
5th	8 December 1993	Looz	2
6th	13 March 2022	Ai no Bakudan=Cherish: Einstein kara no Dengen (愛の爆弾=CHERISH ～アインシュタインからの伝言～)	37

=== Compilation albums ===
	Release Day	Romaji Title	Japanese title	Peak
1st	22 September 1992	Natsu no Owari ni: Acoustic Version	夏の終わりに 〜Acoustic Version〜	2
2nd	6 August 1994	Natsu no Owari ni II: Lookin' for the Eighth Color of the Rainbow	夏の終わりにII 〜Lookin' for the eighth color of the rainbow〜	4

=== Best albums ===
	Release Day	Title	Peak
1st	8 August 1996	Singles	1
2nd	12 December 1996	Ballads	6
3rd	8 December 1999	T-BOLAN FINAL BEST GREATEST SONGS & MORE	66
4th	25 July 2002	complete of T-BOLAN at the BEING studio	88
5th	12 December 2007	BEST OF BEST 1000 T-BOLAN	42
6th	27 May 2008	T-BOLAN BEST HITS	X
7th	24 March 2010	LEGENDS	32
8th	16 August 2023	T-BOLAN COMPLETE SINGLES: SATISFY	26
