= Izumi Sakai =

Japanese singer (1967–2007)

Izumi Sakai 坂井 泉水
- Sakai in 1992

Background information
- Born: Sachiko Kamachi 蒲池 幸子; February 6, 1967; Hiratsuka, Kanagawa, Japan
- Died: May 27, 2007 (aged 40) Tokyo, Japan
- Genres: Rock; pop
- Occupations: Singer; songwriter; model
- Years active: 1988–2007
- Labels: Being; B-Gram
- Formerly of: Zard
- Website: wezard.net

Sachiko Kamachi (Japanese: 蒲池 幸子, Hepburn: Kamachi Sachiko; February 6, 1967 – May 27, 2007), known professionally as Izumi Sakai (坂井 泉水, Sakai Izumi), was a Japanese pop singer and core member of the group Zard. As Sakai was the only member in the group for the majority of the 16 years which it was active, Zard and Sakai may be referred to interchangeably. She was the best-selling female recording artist of the 1990s and has sold over 38 million copies of sales, making her one of the best-selling music artists in Japan of all time.

== Life and career ==
Born in Hiratsuka, Kanagawa, Sakai grew up in Hadano. Her father was a driving instructor, and she had a younger brother and younger sister. After her death, a neighbor recalled that Sakai was "beautiful and popular" in elementary school. She was also athletic, joining the track and field team in junior high and playing tennis in high school. Graduating from Shoin Women's College (now Shoin University) in Atsugi, Sakai worked in a real estate company office for two years before being scouted by Stardust Promotion.

An oil painting by Izumi Sakai

Throughout her life, Sakai remained close to her family and stayed mostly out of the public eye. Upon achieving career success, she helped pay for her parents' home renovation. Acquaintances say that she commuted by subway on a daily basis. On February 6, 1991, she appeared on television to promote her third single, "Mō Sagasanai," and first album, Good-bye My Loneliness. She wore glasses to the interview, and disclosed that she did not fall asleep the night before. Sakai also indicated that she often slept in the morning rather than the evening.

Sakai began playing the piano at age four and aspired to be a musician at a very young age. She visited galleries, attended theater productions, made dry flowers, and painted in oil in her spare time. She also stated that one reason she did not like to travel was that she was not accustomed to eating sashimi and preferred cooked food. Because she was hardly ever seen in public, there were unsubstantiated conspiracy theories in Japan that works by Zard were not produced by the woman pictured (Sakai): She was referred to as an urban legend.

Sakai appears to have been shy. In her first appearance on Music Station, she was asked what took Zard so long to appear on camera. She replied that she wanted to make sure that the Zard project would in fact succeed first. In the other six interviews, Sakai expressed shyness on camera. In fact, a staff member revealed that when Sakai saw multiple people lining up for her concert tour in 2004, she was taken aback and hid herself. After some effort, she was able to walk up to the crowd and thank them for coming. However, her shyness did not reflect an inability to work well with others. It has been noted that after she had gone home early one day she arranged for food to be sent to her staff at her office who were working late into the evening.

=== Professional career ===
For the next two years following her scouting, she was a Toei "karaoke queen" and a promotional model appearing in television commercials for Japan Air System. The following year Sakai was a Nissin race queen. In 1990, Daiko Nagato, a music producer for Being Corporation, noted her potential as a singer-songwriter. Through this connection, she created a Being subsidiary called Sensui (same kanji characters as Izumi) and started her career taking the name Izumi Sakai. In addition to taking a new name, Sakai revised her year of birth from 1967 to 1969.

In 1991, Sakai joined the five-member pop group Zard as lead vocalist. The group name did not have any particular meaning except Sakai felt that word Zard sounded like a rock group. She also took the name as derived from words such as "blizzard" and "wizard." The group's name very quickly became synonymous with Sakai herself, and Sakai wrote the lyrics to all of Zard's songs except "Onna de Itai" and "Koionna no Yuuutsu", both of which were written by Daria Kawashima. By 1993, the four male band members left the group but Sakai chose to keep the Zard name throughout her career. Izumi Sakai was Zard's sole member at the time of the band's debut, although between late 1991 and early 1993 four other members were introduced.

The melodies of early Zard hits were written by prominent Japanese composers, most notably Seiichirō Kuribayashi and Tetsurō Oda. Izumi Sakai wrote nearly all of the lyrics to Zard songs, totaling over one hundred fifty. A veteran recording producer described that while most artists communicate through the transparent glass in the recording studio, Sakai preferred covering the glass with a curtain.

Her 1991 first single, "Good-bye My Loneliness," sold very well, but the following two singles faltered. The "Good-bye My Loneliness" promotion video depicts a youthful and energetic Sakai. A decade after her debut, she listed this song as one of her most memorable pieces, especially because she had to sing it over a hundred times to get the recording right. Her fourth single, "Nemurenai Yoru o Daite" was extremely successful, leading to four television appearances.

On January 27, 1993, Izumi Sakai released her sixth single "Makenaide", which appealed to the Japanese public. Released at a time that is now seen as the beginning of Japan's post economic bubble era when the Nikkei 225 Index had shrunk in value by a third in only three years, "Makenaide" became known as the theme song of the country's Lost Decade." While Sakai commented on the television show Music Station that it would be a song to encourage men taking college and company employment examinations, many people credited this song with helping them cope through difficult issues such as bullying. What is notable about "Makenaide" is that Zard fans' favorite phrase, "Run through Until the End" was originally "Do Not Give Up until the End". "Makenaide" has been used as a theme song for the Nippon Television program 24-hour TV, an annual charity program hosted live by celebrities for a whole day. Sakai said that she was honored and looked forward to watching 24-hour TV. Overall, "Makenaide" sold nearly 2 million copies.

Saki wrote the lyrics to the 1996 song "Dan Dan Kokoro Hikareteku", which was performed by Field of View to be the opening theme of Dragon Ball GT. Zard later released their own version on Today Is Another Day.

Sakai produced 42 singles as well as 11 albums and 5 compilations in her lifetime. In addition to "Makenaide", she produced two other singles that sold over a million copies. Six of her albums as well as her first three compilations also surpassed the one-million mark. Sakai's CD sales had been in decline since 2000, but her death triggered an increase in CD sales.

=== Television appearances ===
- Music Station (TV Asahi), "Nemurenai Yoru o Daite," August 7, 1992
- Music Station (TV Asahi), "Nemurenai Yoru o Daite," August 28, 1992
- Sound Arena (Fuji TV), "Nemurenai Yoru o Daite," September 1992
- Music Station (TV Asahi), "Nemurenai Yoru o Daite," September 18, 1992
- MJ-Music Journal (Fuji TV), "In My Arms Tonight," October 1992
- Music Station (TV Asahi), "In My Arms Tonight," October 6, 1992
- Music Station (TV Asahi), "Makenaide," February 5, 1993

=== Significance ===
The NHK program Close Up Gendai reported on June 18, 2007, that the secret to Sakai's success was that she hardly was seen in public, which created a mystic aura.

== Illness and death ==
According to the Kitto Wasurenai Official book, Sakai had to take a break from her career due to various uterus-related illnesses in 2001, and did not begin working full-time again until 2003. In June 2006, she was diagnosed with cervical cancer, for which she immediately underwent treatment. She appeared to have healed, but discovered that her cancer had spread to her lungs, indicating a Stage 4 cancer. She began undergoing treatment at Keio University Hospital in April 2007, but she never fully recovered.

However, Sakai was neither discouraged nor seemed to believe that she was dying. After her death, the Japanese weekly magazine Friday ran an interview in which said that Sakai thought that modern treatments would enable her to live long. Her mother said that she greeted her visitors cheerfully and did not seem to show the effects of her illness. A fellow patient later said that they walked together at times, and Sakai sang "Makenaide" for her when she could not walk. Finally, Sakai sent an e-mail to her staff saying that she was anxious to go back to producing music and was looking forward to another concert in fall 2007.

Sakai died on May 27, 2007. Police judged her death accidental, the result of a fall from the landing of an emergency-exit slope at Keio University Hospital, where she was undergoing chemotherapy. The slope appeared to be very slippery due to the rain the day before. According to police, the fall took place during a walk on the morning of May 26, 2007, from a height of about 3 meters (about 9 feet and 10 inches). Sakai was discovered unconscious at around 5:40 a.m. by a passerby and taken to the emergency room, where she died the following afternoon of head injuries. Her family was by her side when she died, though it was reported that she never regained consciousness throughout the final day of her life in the emergency room.

Due to the unusual and unlikely nature of her death, police investigated the possibility of suicide, but concluded that it was indeed an accident. In the Friday article, her mother said that Sakai took walks in rehabilitation, and the location where she fell was her favorite place to meditate. Sakai had been planning to release a new album in the fall of 2007, as well as launch her first live tour in three years. She was 40 years old.

== Legacy ==
The sudden news of Sakai's death caused an uproar in the Japanese music industry and began to dominate headlines and the "what's new" spaces on many major music websites. Music Station, a TV program, did a four-minute tribute to her during its June 1, 2007 broadcast. Due to viewer request, another tribute was aired a week later.

The Zard Official Book: Kitto Wasurenai (きっと忘れない―ZARD OFFICIAL BOOK) was released on August 15, 2007. This book contains tracks of 16 years by "Izumi Sakai's poetry" and "Comments of the staff who have helped ZARD".

The book records that she was informed two days before she died, and that Sakai was encouraged by the news that she was selected. Furthermore, the day before her accidental fall, Sakai told a producer who had been with her for 16 years that she was looking forward to have a recording machine at her home so she could start working upon discharge from hospital.

=== Public and private memorial services ===
A closed memorial service was held on June 26 at a funeral hall in Aoyama, Tokyo for members of the entertainment industry. This was attended by celebrities such as Maki Ohguro (another female vocalist who, like Sakai, rarely appears in public and writes most of her own material and like Sakai; a phantom singer). Almost as if to illustrate Sakai's impact on the Japanese music scene and the depth of her presence, singers Tak Matsumoto and Koshi Inaba, members of the popular B'z group, pop-singer Mai Kuraki, and even baseball giant Shigeo Nagashima all left moving messages of their encounters with Sakai. Singers Hikaru Utada and Nanase Aikawa, though not personally acquainted with Sakai, also issued memorial statements on their official web pages, describing how Sakai's death had shocked them.

Sakai is interred at Yokohama Midorinosato in Kanagawa Prefecture.

A public memorial service for Sakai was held the next day and was attended by some 40,000 people from all over Japan.

=== What a Beautiful Memory concert tours ===
A series of memorial concerts were held at Osaka's Festival on September 6 and 7, as well as September 14 in Tokyo's Nippon Budokan, called What a Beautiful Memory. Tickets sold out immediately and 15,000 people gathered for the Tokyo event. Sakai's favorite microphone was placed center-stage, and a recording of Sakai's comments about her thoughts toward the lyrics from 2004 was played. Over 20 members of Sakai's band, who had come together again just for this occasion, began playing "Yureru Omoi". During the intermezzo, video images of the dressing room were shown, showing how staff had set it up in the same way Sakai used it during her What a Beautiful Moment concert tour. The door was labeled "Ms. Sakai Izumi" and the room had a clipboard displaying the day's schedule; lunch boxes were also prepared and laid out on a coffee table.

The band went on to perform 34 songs, ending with "Makenaide." When "Makenaide" ended, Sakai's recorded voice was played back to the sold-out crowd: "Thank you for coming today. I look forward to seeing you all again!" A portion of the proceeds from the concerts were donated to help fund cervical cancer research.

On the stage, nine giant screens showed more previously unreleased off-screen footage of Sakai, excerpts from 10,000 VHS tape recordings of Sakai in off-screen footage that her staff discovered after her death. In the encore of the memorial concerts, the music staff displayed some 300 songs in notebooks hand-written by Sakai that were found after she died.

=== Posthumous single: "Glorious Mind" ===
"Glorious Mind" was released as a posthumous CD single on December 12, 2007. The song was used as the theme song of Detective Conan, Sakai's favorite Japanese anime. The song was broadcast with the episode airing on October 15.

=== What a Beautiful Memory Concert Tour 2008 ===
There was a nationwide tour following the What a Beautiful Memory tour, as announced by Sakai's office. Announced on November 16, 2007, through Zard's official website, it consisted of 15 concerts at 13 locations in early 2008. The first concert was at Kobe's International Forum on January 19 and the final one commemorated the first anniversary of Sakai's death at the Yoyogi National Gymnasium in Yoyogi on May 27. None of the concerts took place at the Tokyo International Forum, where the "What a Beautiful Moment" DVD was mainly recorded, or at Nippon Budokan. Additional previously unreleased footage of Sakai was shown throughout the tour.

== See also ==
- Zard
