= Field of View =

Japanese pop rock band

- Origin: Japan
- Genre: Pop rock
- Years active: 1994–2002; 2012; 2020 -
- Labels: Zain Records; Columbia Records
- Members: U-ya Asaoka (浅岡 雄也); Takuto Kohashi (小橋 琢人); Takashi Oda (小田 孝)
- Past members: Jun Abe (安部 潤); Kenji Niitsu (新津 健二)
- Website: Official Website

(the) Field of View (フィールド・オブ・ビュー Fīrudo obu Byū) are a Japanese pop rock band formed in 1994 by vocalist U-ya Asaoka, guitarist Takashi Oda, keyboardist Jun Abe and drummer Takuto Kohashi, with Jun Abe leaving and Kenji Niitsu joining the following year. The group originally broke up in 2002, but reunited in 2012 and again in 2020.

One of their hit singles, Dan Dan Kokoro Hikareteku (DAN DAN 心魅かれてく) was used as the opening theme for the popular anime series Dragon Ball GT. Another single, Kawaita Sakebi (渇いた叫び) was used as the opening for the original Yu-Gi-Oh! series from Toei in 1998.

== Biography ==
The group was formed on February 9, 1994, when vocalist U-ya Asaoka, guitarist Takashi Oda, keyboardist Jun Abe and drummer (later bandleader) Takuto Kohashi signed up for Being's Zain Records label under the name of view. They released 2 singles under the name 'view'. Just after the Last Goodbye EP in 1995, Abe left the group and bassist Kenji Niitsu joined.

After the Truth of Love EP in 2001, "the" was added in front of the band name for later releases. In 1996, the band gave their first concert, Live Horizon Version 1. Version 2 followed in 1997 and Live Horizon Version 3 in 1999. On June 25, 1999, they performed in the Dublin Castle in London. The Field of View broke up one month after their November 2002 performances held in Tokyo and Osaka. On December 1, 2002, the Field of View performed Field of View Live Horizon - The Final: Gift of Extra Emotion as their final concert. In all, they released 22 singles, 5 studio albums and 5 best albums.

The band reunited (without the former guitarist Takashi Oda) for the first time in 10 years in 2012, during special live event held by music company Being Inc.-Being Legend Live Tour 2012.

On January 26, 2020, through U-ya Asaoka's official website, a new compilation album for the celebration of the 25th anniversary of the band's debut with 5 new songs and previously unpublished songs was announced. The band reformed for two live shows in Tokyo and Osaka for the first time since 2012.

== Members ==
- U-ya Asaoka (浅岡雄也) - vocals, lyrics, composition
- Takuto Kohashi (小橋琢人) - drums, lyrics, composition
- Takashi Oda (小田 孝) - guitar, composition

=== Former Member ===
- Jun Abe (安部潤) - keyboards, arrangement
  - left group after releasing 3rd single Last Goodbye
- Kenji Niitsu (新津健二) - bass guitar, composition, arrangement

== Discography ==
=== Studio albums ===
- Field of View I (1995)
- Field of View II (1996)
- Field of View III ~Now Here No Where~ (1998)
- Lovely Jubbly (1999)
- Capsule Monster (2000)
