= U-ya Asaoka =

Japanese singer-singwriter (born 1969)

U-ya Asaoka 浅岡 雄也
- Born: Yuuichi Asaoka (浅岡 雄一 Asaoka Yūichi); 25 January 1969 (age 57); Tokyo, Japan
- Genres: J-pop
- Occupations: Musician; singer; songwriter
- Years active: 1990-present (music activity); 2003-present (solo singer activity)
- Label: FlyBlue
- Member of: Field of View
- Website: uyax.jp

U-ya Asaoka (浅岡 雄也, Asaoka Yūya; born 25 January 1969, Tokyo), is a Japanese singer, songwriter and musician under the FlyBlue label. He is also vocalist of the Japanese band Field of View.

== Biography ==
The beginning of his career started in 1990, when he became vocalist of band Missing Peace and one year later in band Pandora. U-ya is known for being the former vocalist of Field of View rock-band under Zain Records label. They disbanded in 2002 after their final live tour. In 2003, he started his activity as a soloist under the Merdack label. In 2009, Asaoka established his own label Fly-blue with new website. In 2011, Asaoka appeared as a guest member of Zard live tour What a beautiful memory: Forever you. In 2012, he appeared in Being Inc. anniversary concert Being Legend Live Tour with almost all ex-members from Field of View. In 2015, he made guest appearance in television variety show Ariyoshi Hanseikai hosted by Hiroiki Ariyoshi.

On 26 January 2020, Asaoka Yuuya's official website announced a new compilation album to celebrate the 25th anniversary of the debut of Field of the View with 5 new songs and previously unpublished songs. The band will reform for two days live in Tokyo and Osaka for the first time since 2012.

== Discography ==
So far he has released 9 singles, 9 studio albums, 4 mini albums, 2 compilation albums and 1 acoustic album

=== Singles ===
	Release date	Title	Music production	Peak
1st	2003/12/3	Life goes on	lyricist：U-ya Asaoka composer：Eddy Blues arranger：Kouichi Sawasaki	55
2nd	2004/10/21	Kimi wo Mamoritakute (キミヲマモリタクテ)	lyricist：U-ya Asaoka composer：Shinya Kimura arranger：Kume Yasutaka	63
3rd	2005/02/3	Sakurairo (桜色)	lyricist：U-ya Asaoka composer：U-ya Asaoka arranger：Kume Yasutaka	117
4th	2005/09/22	Tabibito tachi he (旅人たちへ)	lyricist：U-ya Asaoka&Karin composer：U-ya Asaoka arranger：Abe Yasuhiro	74
5th	2007/03/21	Bokutachi no Harmony (僕達のHarmony)	lyricist：U-ya Asaoka&Karin composer：Yoo Hejun arranger：Toshino Tanabe	97
6th	2008/12/3	Ikiru Hoshi (生きる星)	lyricist：Hiroyuki Ishimori composer：Yatabe Tadashi arranger：Yatabe Tadashi	132
7th	2013/7/26	Doubt/Nanairo (ダウト/七色)	lyricist：U-ya Asaoka composer：U-ya Asaoka arranger：U-ya Asaoka	-
8th	2014/7/26	Kiseki no youna Kakuritsu de/Rainbow ~Ano Niji no Nukou he to~ (奇跡のような確率で/Rainbow 〜あの虹の向こうへと〜)	lyricist：U-ya Asaoka composer：U-ya Asaoka arranger：U-ya Asaoka	-
9th	2015/4/25	Mirai no Reality/True or Lie (未来のReality/True or Lie)	lyricist：U-ya Asaoka composer：U-ya Asaoka arranger：U-ya Asaoka	-
10th	2017/4/1	Ima Iru Sekai wo Ai de Kazarou (イマイルセカイヲアイデカザロウ)	lyricist：U-ya Asaoka composer：U-ya Asaoka arranger：U-ya Asaoka&Baba Kazuyoshi	-
11th	2017/7/29	Anata to Mirai wo (アナタトミライヲ)	lyricist：U-ya Asaoka composer：U-ya Asaoka arranger：U-ya Asaoka&Baba Kazuyoshi	-
12th	2018/3/31	Revolution〜No15〜	lyricist：U-ya Asaoka composer：U-ya Asaoka arranger：Baba Kazuyoshi	-

=== Studio albums ===
	Release date	Title	Label	Peak
1st	2003/7/30	Uta no Chikara (ウタノチカラ)	Merdack	50
2nd	2004/03/17	Kotonoha (コトノハ)	Merdack	99
3rd	2004/11/25	Kibou no Neiro (キボウノネイロ)	Merdack	85
4th	2005/10/26	Toki no Shizuku (トキノシズク)	Merdack	79
5th	2007/4/25	Horizon	Merdack	152
6th	2006/4/26	Uta Utai: Sono Ichi (ウタウタイ 其の一)	Merdack	143
7th	2007/4/25	Uta no Chikaratachi: U-ya Asaoka Best Album (ウタノチカラタチ+4～u-ya asaoka Best Album～)	Merdack	103
8th	2009/11/25	Uta wa Tobira wo Aketeyuku (ウタハトビラヲアケテユク)	FlyBlue	-
9th	2011/10/10	Kimi ga Sekai wo Kaeteyuku (キミガセカイヲカエテユク)	FlyBlue	-
10th	2013/10/25	Mirai no Tsukurikata (ミライノツクリカタ)	FlyBlue	-
11th	2015/10/1	Show must go on	FlyBlue	-
12th	2017/10/22	Anata to Mirai wo (アナタトミライヲ)	FlyBlue	-
13th	2018/7/20	U-ya Asaoka FlyBlue Best 2018	FlyBlue	-

=== Mini albums ===
	Release date	Title	Label
1st	2010/5/15/	Sekai no Mannaka de (世界の真ん中で)	Flyblue
2nd	2011/1/1	Mepifoeba (メビフォエバ)	Flyblue
3rd	2012/3/24	Sora no Hate (空の果て)	Flyblue
4th	2013/3/31	Only Lonely	Flyblue

=== DVD ===
	Release date	Title	Label	Peak
1st	2004/09/29	1st LIVE TOUR KOTONOHA 2004 "To the Next From Here"	Merdack	-
2nd	2006/02/06	10th Anniversary 3rd LIVE TOUR 2005 "Toki no Shizuku"	Merdack	201
3rd	2013/4/10	BEING LEGEND Live Tour 2012"	Being Inc.	25
4th	2015/04/25	U-ya asaoka 20150425 Live Bootleg 20150425@shibuya the Game"	Fly-Blue	-

== See also ==
- Field of View
