= Masao Akashi =

Masao Akashi 明石昌夫
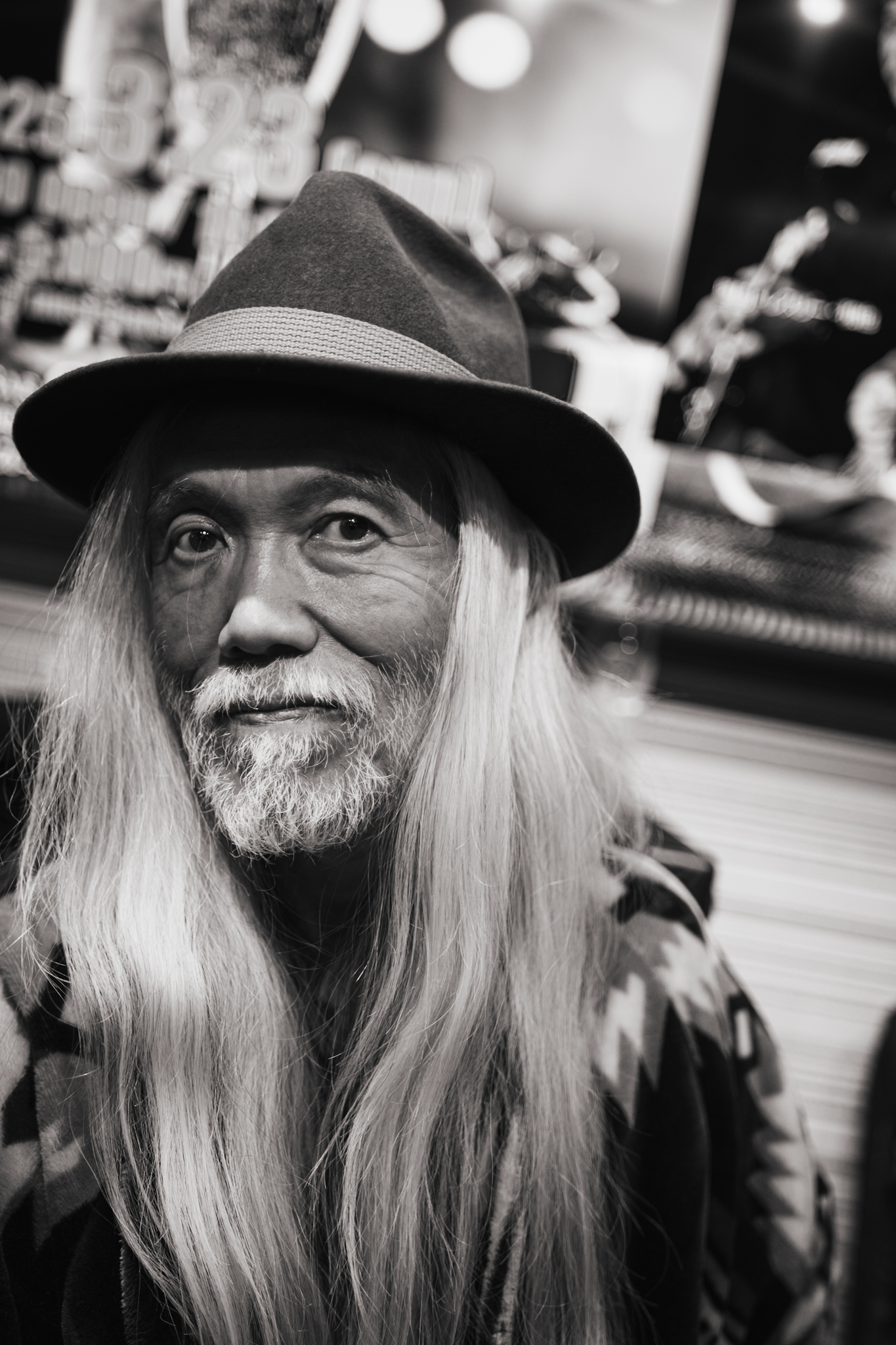
- Akashi in 2025

Background information
- Also known as: Max Brightstone
- Born: March 25, 1957; Japan
- Died: May 19, 2025 (aged 68)
- Genres: Japanese pop; Rock
- Occupations: Music arranger; producer; bassist
- Years active: 1988–1998
- Label: B-Gram
- Formerly of: Wands; B'z; Zard; Manish

Masao Akashi (明石昌夫, Akashi Masao; March 25, 1957 – May 19, 2025) was a Japanese music arranger in distributors Being Inc., mainly in their label B-Gram Records.

In 1988, he debuted as arranger in debut single Dakara Sono Te wo Hanashite by Japanese hard-rock band B'z. By 1998, his arrangement work had been involved with many Being artists including Manish, Wands and Zard.

Although Akashi was no longer working for Being Inc., he sometimes provided producing jobs for various artists such as Naomi Tamura, Maria, Color Bottle and Sonoda Band.

Akashi died on May 19, 2025, at the age of 68.

== List of provided works as arranger ==
★ album ☆ single/coupling

=== B'z ===
- B'z ★
- Off the Lock ★
- Bad Communication ★
- Wicked Beat ★
- Mars (B'z album) ★
- Love is, Seasons, Itsuka no Merry Christmas (Reprise) (Friends (B'z album)) ★
- The 7th Blues ★
- Teki ga Inakerya (Loose (B'z album))★
- Lady-Go-Round ☆
- Kimi no Naka de Odoritai ☆
- Be There ☆
- Taiyō no Komachi Angel ☆
- Easy Come, Easy Go! ☆
- Itoshii Hitoyo Good Night… ☆
- Lady Navigation ☆
- Alone ☆
- Blowin' ☆
- Zero ☆
- Ai no mama ni Wagamama ni Boku wa Kimi dake o Kizutsukenai ☆
- Hadashi no Megami ☆
- Don't Leave Me ☆
- Motel ☆
- Tokyo ☆

=== Zard ===
- Good-bye My Loneliness (song) ☆
- Koi Onna no Yūutsu, It's a Boy (Good-bye My Loneliness) ★
- Fushigi ne... ☆
- Mō Sagasanai ☆
- Nemurenai Yoru wo Daite ☆
- Dareka ga Matteru, Sayonara Ienakute, Ano Hohoemi wo Wasurenai de, Dangerous Tonight, Tooi Hi no Nostalgia, So Together Hold Me ★
- In My Arms Tonight ☆
- Stray Love ☆
- Kimi ga Inai ☆
- Yureru Omoi ☆
- Season, Anata wo Suki dakedo, Listen to me, I want you, Futari no Natsu (Yureru Omoi) ★
- Mō Sukoshi, Ato Sukoshi... ☆
- Oh My Love (whole album) ★
- Kitto Wasurenai ☆
- Kono Ai ni Oyogi Tsukarete mo/Boy ☆
- Konna ni Soba ni Iru no ni ☆
- Ima Sugu Ai ni Kite, High Heel Nugi Sutete, Forever you, Mou Nigetari Shinai wa Omoide kara, Hitomi Sorasanaide (Forever You) ★
- Take Me to Your Dream ☆
- Teenage Dream ☆
- Love ~Nemurezu ni Kimi no Yokogao Zutto Miteita~, Mitsumete Itai ne (Today Is Another Day) ★
- Ai de Anata wo Sukuimashou Tomatteita Tokei ga Ima Ugokidashita ★
- Tsubasa wo Hirogete ☆

=== Manish ===
- Koe ni Naranaide Itoshii ☆
- Kimi ga Hoshii Zenbu ga Hoshii ☆
- Dakedo Tomerarenai ☆
- Mou Dare mo Me wo Kinishinai ☆
- Kirameku Toki ni Torawarete ☆
- Best Friend ☆
- True Heart ★

=== Wands (band) ===
- Sabishisa wa Aki no Iro ☆
- Toki no Tobira ☆
- Sekaijuu no Dare yori Kitto ☆
- Glass no Kokoro de, Sono Mama Kimi he to, Kodoku he no Target (Toki no Tobira) ★
- Ai wo Kataru yori Kuchizuke wo Kawasou ☆

=== Tube ===
- Remember me, Summer Girl, Hey Baby, Melody Kimi no Tame ni (Summer City) ★

=== BAAD ===
- Kimi ga Suki to Sakebitai ☆
- Donna Toki demo Hold me Tight ☆
- Do you wanna hold me? ☆

=== Keiko Utoku ===
- Dokomademo Zutto ★
- Message ★

=== Miho Komatsu ===
- Dream in Love, Otogi Banashi, Sabitsuita Machine Gun de Kimi wo Uchinukou, Aoi Sora ni Deaeta, Kono Machi de Kimi to Kurashitai, Kimi ga Inai Natsu (Nazo (album)) ★

=== Maki Ohguro ===
- Stop Motion ☆

=== Field of View ===
- Mou Ichido ★

=== Yumiko Morishita ===
- Tears ☆
- Somebody to believe ☆

=== T-BOLAN ===
- Just Illusion ☆
- So Bad ☆
- Only Lonely Crazy Heart ★

=== Mi-Ke ===
- Apple Love
- Swan no Namida
- Emerald no Densetsu
- Omoide no Nagisa
- Blue Night Yokosuka
- Blue Light Yokohama

=== Seiichirou Kuribayashi ===
- La Jolla ★
- Summer Illusion ★
- Kimi ga Inai ★

=== KIX-S ===
- Tobikiri Lonely Night
- Mou Ichido Dakishimete
- Too Late

=== V6 (band) ===
- Jiyuu de aru Tame ni ☆
- Puzzle (A Jack In the Box) ★
- Over ☆

=== Siam Shade ===
- 1/3 no Junjō na Kanjō ☆

=== Fairy Fore ===
- Vivid (Final Fantasy: Unlimited) ★

=== Nobuaki Kakuda ===
- Gifuu Doudou! ☆

=== Tomomi Kahara ===
- As a person ☆
- Be Honest ☆
- Blue Sky ☆

=== TUNE'S ===
- Dōbutsuen wa Taihen da ☆

=== Maria (band) ===
- Yurari Sakurazora
- Kanashimi Rensa

=== Yuko Nakazawa ===
- Futari Kurashi

=== Yoko Minamino ===
- Kiss-shite Loneliness ☆
- Natsu no Obaka-san ☆

=== Hiroko Anzai ===
- Necessary ☆
- Andersen ☆

=== Under Graph ===
- Majimesugiru Kimi he ★

== List of provided works as producer ==
=== Maria ===
- You Go!: We are Maria ★
- Yurari Sakurazora ★
- Day by day ★

=== Naomi Tamura ===
- Pearly Gate ★

=== Color Bottle ===
- Good Music ★

=== Hekiru Shiina ===
- Precious Garden ★

=== Manish ===
- Manish ★

=== Sonoda Band ===
- Shift Rise

== List of works as a supportive musician ==
=== B'z ===
- The 7th Blues
- Love Phantom
- Off the Lock
- Mars (B'z album)
- Loose (B'z album)
- Survive (B'z album)
- Eleven (B'z album)

=== Gackt ===
- Re:Born

=== Wands ===
- Same Side

== Television appearance ==
In Music Station as bassist:

- Manish: Kirameku Toki ni Torawarete
- B'z: Fireball, Real Thing Shakes, Snow/Kizugokoro, LOVE PHANTOM, love me I love you, Negai, Itsuka no Merry Christmas, Odekakemashou, Ai no Mama ni Wagamama ni Boku wa Kimi dake wo Kizutsukanai, Zero, Be There

In online television Infinite Colors

- Third episode

== Magazine appearance ==
From J-Rock Magazine:

- 1996: Vol,8 (January), Vol.11 (April), Vol.14(June), Vol.19 (December)
- 1997: Vol.20 (January)

From E-cube Magazine:

- 2017/September Vol.186

From Sound&Recording Magazine:

- 2003/May
