= In My Arms Tonight =

Single by Zard

from the album Yureru Omoi
- Released: 9 September 1992
- Genre: Pop rock
- Label: B-Gram Records
- Songwriters: Izumi Sakai, Michiya Haruhata
- Producer: Daiko Nagato

Zard singles chronology
"Nemurenai Yoru wo Daite" (1992)	"In My Arms Tonight" (1992)	"Makenaide" (1993)

"In My Arms Tonight" is the 5th single by Zard and released 9 September 1992 under B-Gram Records label. It was released one month after previous single "Nemurenai Yoru wo Daite" and one week after album "Hold Me". The single peaked at #9 rank on the Oricon charts. It charted for 13 weeks and sold over 322,000 copies.

== Track list ==
All songs are written by Izumi Sakai.

1. In My Arms Tonight
  - composer: Michiya Haruhata (Tube)/arrangement: Masao Akashi
    - the song was used in TBS drama Gakkou ga Abunai as theme song
2. Ase no Naka de CRY (汗の中でCRY)
  - composer: Toshiya Matsukawa/arrangement: Masazumi Ozawa (Pamelah) and Daisuke Ikeda
3. In My Arms Tonight (original karaoke)
4. Ase no Naka de CRY (汗の中でCRY) (original karaoke)
