= List of best-selling singles in 1993 (Japan) =

This is a list of the best-selling singles in 1993 in Japan, as reported by Oricon.

Ranking	Single	Artist	Release	Sales
1	"Yah Yah Yah"	Chage and Aska	March 3, 1993	2,408,000
2	"Ai no mama ni Wagamama ni Boku wa Kimi dake o Kizutsukenai"	B'z	March 17, 1993	1,932,000
3	"Road"	The Tra-Bryu	January 21, 1993	1,887,000
4	"Erotica Seven"	Southern All Stars	July 21, 1993	1,717,000
5	"Hadashi no Megami"	B'z	June 2, 1993	1,653,000
6	"Makenaide"	Zard	January 27, 1993	1,645,000
7	"Toki no Tobira"	Wands	February 26, 1993	1,443,000
8	"Manatsu no Yo no Yume"	Yumi Matsutoya	July 26, 1993	1,421,000
9	"Yureru Omoi"	Zard	May 19, 1993	1,396,000
10	"Sekaijū no Dare Yori Kitto"	Miho Nakayama & Wands	October 28, 1992	1,326,000
11	"Motto Tsuyoku Dakishimeta Nara"	Wands	July 1, 1993	1,315,000
12	"Konomama Kimidake wo Ubaisaritai"	Deen	March 10, 1993	1,293,000
13	"Kiss Me"	Kyosuke Himuro	December 7, 1992	1,230,000
14	"Ai wo Kataru yori Kuchizuke wo Kawaso"	Wands	April 17, 1993	1,121,000
15	"Natsu no Hi no 1993"	class	April 21, 1993	1,112,000
16	"Go for It!"	Dreams Come True	September 9, 1993	1,043,000
17	"Bye for Now"	T-Bolan	November 18, 1992	1,005,000
18	"Yasashii Ame"	Kyōko Koizumi	February 3, 1993	958,000
