= Zard Forever Best: 25th Anniversary =

Greatest hits album by Zard
- Released: February 10, 2016
- Genre: J-pop
- Length: Disc 1 58:55; Disc 2 60:19; Disc 3 61:07; Disc 4 61:30
- Label: Being Inc.
- Producer: Daiko Nagato

Zard chronology
Zard Request Best: Beautiful Memory (2008)	Zard Forever Best: 25th Anniversary (2016)	Zard Best Request: 35th Anniversary (2025)

Zard Forever Best: 25th Anniversary is the fourth compilation album by Japanese pop band Zard. It was released on 10 February 2016 under B-Gram Records.

== Background ==
The album was released on same day as Zard debut single Good-bye My Loneliness. This album includes 4 CDs of the biggest hits from their career such as Makenaide, Yureru Omoi or Kokoro wo Hiraite with total 52 tracks.

Each CD symbolizes nature season such as spring (CD1), summer (CD2), autumn (C3) and winter (CD4). This album was released to promote Zard's 25th anniversary debut. In 2017 they were released as individual CDs with different color title.

All the songs went through digital remastering with new original release on Blu-spec CD format. First press edition included booklet of Zard's photos and special QR code where fans could see making and preparation of their first live performance on ship Zard Cruising & Live.

Three types of commercials had been aired: with female, male voice and Conan's (Minami Takayama)'s voice actor and later uploaded on their official YouTube channel.

== Charts ==
The album reached daily #1 and weekly #4 rank in first week. It charted for 278 weeks and sold more than 237,000 copies so far. The album received Golden award as well.

== Track listing ==
All lyrics written by Izumi Sakai, except Disc 2 #8 and #13 written by both Izumi Sakai and Show Wesugi.

=== Disc 1 (Spring) ===
No.	Title	Music	Arrangers	Length
1.	"Don't you see!" (19th single)	Seiichiro Kuribayashi	Takeshi Hayama	5:02
2.	"My Friend" (マイ フレンド, 17th single)	Tetsurō Oda	Takeshi Hayama	4:23
3.	"Kono Ai ni Oyogi Tsukaretemo" (この愛に泳ぎ疲れても, 11th single)	Tetsurou Oda	Masao Akashi	4:18
4.	"Good-bye My Loneliness" (debut single)	Tetsurou Oda	Masao Akashi	4:36
5.	"Wake Up Make the Morning Last -Wasuregataki Hito he-" (WAKE UP MAKE THE MORNING LAST〜忘れがたき人へ〜, from 8th album "Eien")	Hiroya Fukuyama	Hirohito Furui	3:59
6.	"Kimi ni Aitakunattara..." (君に逢いたくなったら…, 20th single)	Tetsurou Oda	Takeshi Hayama	3:49
7.	"Iki mo Dekinai" (息もできない, 24th single)	Tetsurou Oda	Takeshi Hayama	4:38
8.	"Ima Sugu Ai ni Kite" (今すぐ会いに来て, from 6th album "Forever you")	Seiichiro Kuribayashi	Masao Akashi	4:28
9.	"High Heel Nugi Sutete" (ハイヒール脱ぎ捨てて, from 6th album "Forever you")	Seiichirou Kuribayashi	Masao Akashi	5:22
10.	"Forever you" (from 6th album "Forever you")	Tetsurou Oda	Masao Akashi	4:41
11.	"Ashita wo Yume Mite" (明日を夢見て, 35th single)	Aika Ohno	Satoru Kobayashi	4:39
12.	"Tsubasa wo Hirogete" (翼を広げて, 44th single, originally performed by Deen)	Tetsurou Oda	Masao Akashi	4:33
13.	"Ai wa Kurayami no Naka de feat. Aya Kamiki" (愛は暗闇の中で, 44th single's c/w)	Seiichirou Kuribayashi	Siyon Morishita	4:34

=== Disc 2 (Summer) ===
No.	Title	Music	Arrangers	Length
1.	"Hoshi no Kagayaki yo" (星のかがやきよ, 40th single)	Aika Ohno	Takeshi Hayama	3:51
2.	"Natsu wo Matsu Sail no You ni" (夏を待つセイル(帆)のように, 40th single)	Aika Ohno	Takeshi Hayama	4:36
3.	"Kimi ga Inai" (君がいない, 7th single)	Seiichirou Kuribayashi	Masao Akashi	3:59
4.	"Kokoro wo Hiraite" (心を開いて, 18th single)	Tetsurou Oda	Daisuke Ikeda	4:08
5.	"Yureru Omoi" (揺れる想い, 8th single)	Tetsurou Oda	Masao Akashi	4:28
6.	"Sunao ni Ienakute feat. Mai Kuraki" (素直に言えなくて, 45th single)	Izumi Sakai	Hitoshi Okamoto	4:19
7.	"Oh My Love" (from 5th album "Oh My Love")	Tetsurou Oda	Masao Akashi	4:33
8.	"Ame ni Nurete" (雨に濡れて, from 5th album "Oh My Love")	Seiichirou Kuribayashi	Masao Akashi	4:36
9.	"I still remember" (from 5th album "Oh My Love")	Seiichirou Kuribayashi	Masao Akashi	6:09
10.	"Rainen no Natsu mo" (来年の夏も, from 5th album "Oh My Love")	Seiichirou Kuribayashi	Masao Akashi	4:33
11.	"Anata ni Kaeritai" (あなたに帰りたい, from 5th album "Oh My Love")	Seiichirou Kuribayashi	Masao Akashi	6:20
12.	"Ai ga Mienai" (愛が見えない, 15th single)	Masazumi Ozawa	Takeshi Hayama	4:03
13.	"Hateshinai Yume wo feat. Zyyg, Rev, Zard & Wands" (果てしない夢を)	Masayuki Deguchi (ex.Rev)	Masao Akashi	4:50

=== Disc 3 (Autumn) ===
No.	Title	Music	Arrangers	Length
1.	"Kakegae no Nai Mono" (かけがえのないもの, 38th single)	Aika Ohno	Satoru Kobayashi	4:15
2.	"Tooi Hoshi wo Kazoete" (遠い星を数えて, 21st single's c/w)	Seiichirou Kuribayashi	Akihito Tokunaga	5:09
3.	"Kaze ga Toori Nukeru Machi he" (風が通り抜ける街へ, 21st single)	Tetsurou Oda	Akihito Tokunaga	4:41
4.	"Dan Dan Kokoro Hikareteku" (DAN DAN 心魅かれてく, from 7th album "Today Is Another Day", originally performed by Field of View)	Tetsurou Oda	Daisuke Ikeda	4:32
5.	"Totsuzen" (突然, from 7th album "Today Is Another Day", originally performed by Field of View)	Tetsurou Oda	Takeshi Hayama	4:35
6.	"Today is another day" (from 7th album "Today Is Another Day")	Tetsurou Oda	Daisuke Ikeda	5:17
7.	"Season" (from 4th album "Yureru Omoi")	Seiichirou Kuribayashi	Takeshi Hayama	4:06
8.	"Nemurenai Yoru wo Daite" (眠れない夜を抱いて, 4th single)	Tetsurou Oda	Masao Akashi, Daisuke Ikeda	4:28
9.	"Konnani Soba ni Iru no ni" (こんなにそばに居るのに, 12th single)	Seiichirou Kuribayashi	Masao Akashi	5:34
10.	"Eien" (永遠, 22nd single)	Akihito Tokunaga	Akihito Tokunaga	3:49
11.	"Sayonara wa Ima mo Kono Mune ni Imasu" (サヨナラは今もこの胸に居ます, 16th single)	Seiichirou Kuribayashi	Takeshi Hayama	5:07
12.	"Nemuri" (眠り, 16th single's c/w)	Izumi Sakai	Daisuke Ikeda	5:11
13.	"Ano Hohoemi wo Wasurenaide" (あの微笑みを忘れないで, from 3rd album "Hold Me")	Daria Kawashima	Masao Akashi	4:25

=== Disc 4 (Winter) ===
No.	Title	Music	Arrangers	Length
1.	"Mou Sukoshi Ato Sukoshi..." (もう少し あと少し…, 9th single)	Seiichirou Kuribayashi	Masao Akashi	4:49
2.	"Get U're Dream" (32nd single)	Aika Ohno	Takeshi Hayama	5:13
3.	"IN MY ARMS TONIGHT" (5th single)	Michiya Haruhata	Masao Akashi	4:24
4.	"Unmei no Roulette Mawashite" (運命のルーレット廻して, 25th single)	Seiichirou Kuribayashi	Daisuke Ikeda	5:01
5.	"Shoujo no Koro ni Modotta mitai ni" (少女の頃に戻ったみたいに, 25th single's c/w)	Aika Ohno	Daisuke Ikeda	5:13
6.	"Kitto Wasurenai" (きっと忘れない, 10th single)	Tetsurou Oda	Masao Akashi	4:06
7.	"Konnani Aishitemo" (こんなに愛しても, 3rd single's c/w)	Seiichirou Kuribayashi	Masao Akashi	4:43
8.	"promised you" (33rd single)	Seiichirou Kuribayashi	Cybersound	5:04
9.	"Good Day" (27th single)	Masaaki Watanuki	Daisuke Ikeda	5:13
10.	"My Baby Grand -Nukumori ga Hoshikute-" (〜ぬくもりが欲しくて〜, 23rd single)	Tetsurou Oda	Daisuke Ikeda	4:13
11.	"Glorious Mind" (グロリアス マインド, 43rd single)	Aika Ohno	Takeshi Hayama	4:43
12.	"Anata wo Kanjiteitai" (あなたを感じていたい, 13th single)	Tetsurou Oda	Tetsurou Oda	5:10
13.	"Makenaide" (負けないで, 6th single)	Tetsurou Oda	Takeshi Hayama	3:46

== Use in other media ==
- My Friend: 4th ending theme for Anime television series Slam Dunk
- Unmei no Roulette Mawashite: opening theme for Anime television series Detective Conan
- Hoshi no Kagayaki yo: opening theme for Anime television series Detective Conan
- Shoujo no Koro ni Modotta Mitai: theme song for anime movie Detective Conan: The Fourteenth Target
- Don't You See!: ending theme for Anime television series Dragon Ball GT
- Kono Ai ni Oyogi Tsukaretemo: opening theme for drama "Ai to Giwaku no Suspense"
- Good-bye My Loneliness: theme song for drama "Kekkon no Risou to Genjitsu"
- Kimi ni Aitakunattara...: theme song for drama "Risou no Kekkon"
- Iki mo Dekinai: opening theme for Anime television series Chūka Ichiban!
- High Heel Nugi Sutete: ending theme for Fuji TV program "Oi oi Tokyo Taste Rooms"
- Ashita wo Yume Mite: ending theme for Anime television series Detective Conan
- Glorious Mind: opening theme for Anime television series Detective Conan
- Tsubasa wo Hirogete: theme song for anime movie Detective Conan: Full Score of Fear
- Ai wa Kurayami no Naka de feat. Aya Kamiki ver.: opening theme for anime Detective Conan
- Natsu wo Matsu Sail no You ni: theme song for anime movie Detective Conan: Strategy Above the Depths
- Kimi ga Inai: theme song for drama "Kanojo na Kiraina Kanojo"
- Kakegae no Nai Mono: theme song for Tokyo Broadcasting System Television program "Koisuru Hamikami!"
- Today is another day: theme song for Anime television series Yawara!
- Nemurenai Yoru wo Daite: ending theme for TV Asahi program "Tonight"
