= Tsubasa wo Hirogete/Ai wa Kurayami no Naka de =

Single by Zard

from the album Zard Forever Best: 25th Anniversary
- Released: April 9, 2008
- Genre: Pop rock
- Length: 18:00
- Label: B-Gram Records
- Producer: Daiko Nagato

Zard singles chronology
"'Glorious Mind'" (2007)	"Tsubasa wo Hirogete/Ai wa Kurayami no Naka de" (2008)	"'Sunao ni Ienakute'" (2009)

"Tsubasa wo Hirogete/Ai wa Kurayami no Naka de (翼を広げて/愛は暗闇の中で)" is the 44th single by Japanese band Zard. It was released 9 April 2008 under B-Gram Records label.

== Background ==
This is the second posthumously released single after vocalist Izumi Sakai's death.

Tsubasa wo Hirogete is self-cover song of Japanese band Deen's second single. The vocalist of Deen band, Ikemori Shuuichi, didn't participate in chorus part, however he appeared as guest member during their What A Beautiful Memory live series. The song was used as theme song in anime movie Detective Conan: Full Score of Fear.

Ai wa Kurayami no Naka de is the re-arranged coupling song from their debut single Good-bye My Loneliness. Japanese singer Aya Kamiki participated in chorus part. The song was used as opening theme for the anime television series Detective Conan. To date, it is the last Zard song used for Detective Conan.

The songs weren't included in any studio album, however it was released in their compilation album Zard Forever Best: 25th Anniversary in 2016.

It was released in two formats: regular CD edition and limited CD+DVD edition. The DVD disc includes footage from live "What a beautiful memory 2007" of their song Kitto Wasurenai. The jacket cover is same in both editions.

== Oricon charting ==
The single reached #3 rank in its first week. It charted for 12 weeks and sold over 83,000 copies.

== Track list ==
All lyrics are written by Izumi Sakai and arranged by Masao Akashi (#1) and Siyon Morishita (Naifu) (#2); all music is composed by Tetsurō Oda (#1) Seiichiro Kuribayashi (#2) and

No.	Title	Length
1.	"Tsubasa wo Hirogete (翼を広げて)" (originally performed by Deen)	4:33
2.	"Ai wa Kurayami no Naka de (愛は暗闇の中で)" (featuring Aya Kamiki)	4:34
3.	"Tsubasa wo Hirogete (翼を広げて)" (original karaoke)	4:33
4.	"Ai wa Kurayami no Naka de (愛は暗闇の中で)" (original karaoke)	4:34
