= Yureru Omoi =

Yureru Omoi may refer to:

- Yureru Omoi (song), a 1993 single by Zard
- Yureru Omoi (album), a 1993 album by Zard
