= Forever You =

Studio album by Zard
- Released: March 10, 1995
- Genre: Rock; J-pop
- Length: 48:27
- Label: B-Gram
- Producer: B・M・F

Zard chronology
Oh My Love (1994)	Forever You (1995)	Today Is Another Day (1996)

Singles from Forever You
- 1. "Konna ni Soba ni Iru no ni" Released: 6 August 1994; 2. "Anata wo Kanjiteitai" Released: 24 December 1994; 3. "Just Believe in Love" Released: 1 February 1995

Forever You is the sixth album by Zard and was released on March 10, 1995, under B-Gram Records label.

== Background ==
The album contains three previously released tracks.

For first time ZARD self-covered song Hitomi ni Sorasanaide which was originally performed by a Being artist Deen.

== Chart performance ==
The album charted #1 rank in Oricon first week. It charted for 35 weeks and sold more than 1,774,000 copies.

== Track listing ==
All lyrics written by Izumi Sakai.

No.	Title	Music	Arrangers	Length
1.	"Ima Sugu Ai ni Kite" (今すぐ会いに来て)	Seiichiro Kuribayashi	Masao Akashi	4:29
2.	"High Heel Nugi Sutete" (ハイヒール脱ぎ捨てて)	Seiichirou Kuribayashi	Masao Akashi	5:21
3.	"Forever you"	Tetsurō Oda	Masao Akashi	4:41
4.	"Mou Nigetari Shinai wa Omoide kara" (もう逃げたりしないわ 想い出から)	Seiichiro Kuribayashi	Masao Akashi	4:30
5.	"Anata wo Kanjiteitai" (あなたを感じていたい)	Tetsurou Oda	Tetsurou Oda	5:08
6.	"Kiraku ni Ikou" (気楽に行こう)	Seiichirou Kuribayashi	Daisuke Ikeda	4:31
7.	"I'm in Love"	Tetsurou Oda	Daisuke Ikeda	4:10
8.	"Konna ni Soba ni Iru no ni" (こんなにそばに居るのに)	Seiichirou Kuribayashi	Masao Akashi; Daisuke Ikeda	5:16
9.	"Just Believe in Love"	Michiya Haruhata	Takeshi Hayama	5:31
10.	"Hitomi Sorasanaide" (瞳そらさないで, originally performed by Deen)	Tetsurou Oda	Masao Akashi	4:50

== Usage in media ==
- Konnani Soba ni Iru no ni: commercial song of "Boutique joy"
- Anata wo Kanjiteitai: commercial song of NTT DoCoMo
- Just believe in love: theme song for Tokyo Broadcasting System Television drama "Yureru Omoi"
- High Heel Nugi Sutete: ending theme for Fuji TV program "OIOI Tokyo Style Room's"

== Charts ==
Year	Chart	Position	First week sales	Annual sales	Yearly position
1995	Japanese Oricon Weekly Albums Chart (Top 100)	1	620,460	1,773,930	4
