= Just Believe in Love =

Single by Zard

from the album Forever You
- Released: February 1, 1995
- Genre: Pop rock; pop
- Label: B-Gram Records
- Songwriters: Izumi Sakai, Michiya Haruhata
- Producer: Daiko Nagato

Zard singles chronology
"Anata wo Kanjiteitai" (1994)	"Just Believe in Love" (1995)	"Ai ga Mienai" (1995)

"Just Believe in Love" is the 14th single by Zard and was released on 1 February 1995 under the B-Gram Records label. The single debuted at #2 rank first week. It charted for 11 weeks and sold over 656,000 copies.

== Track listing ==
All songs are written by Izumi Sakai and arranged by Takeshi Hayama

1. Just Believe in Love
  - composer: Michiya Haruhata
    - the song was used in TBS drama Yureru Omoi as theme song
2. Ready, Go!
  - composer: Daria Kawashima
3. Just Believe in Love (original karaoke)
