= Gedo (disambiguation) =

Gedo is an administrative region in southwestern Somalia.

Gedo may also refer to:

- Gedo Senki, an anime film by Studio Ghibli
- Gedo (wrestler) (Keiji Takayama), Japanese professional wrestler
- Gedo, a fictional high school in the film Battlefield Baseball
- Gedo (footballer), Egyptian footballer (real name Mohamed Nagy)
- Mohamed Nagy (footballer, born 1996), Egyptian footballer nicknamed Gedo
- Gedō (band), a Japanese rock band
