= Sunao ni Ienakute =

Single by Zard

from the album Zard Forever Best: 25th Anniversary
- Released: May 27, 2009
- Genre: Pop rock
- Length: 12:00
- Label: B-Gram Records
- Composer(s): Izumi Sakai
- Lyricist(s): Izumi Sakai
- Producer(s): Daiko Nagato

Zard singles chronology
"'Tsubasa wo Hirogete/Ai wa Kurayami no Naka de'" (2008)	"Sunao ni Ienakute" (2009)

"Sunao ni Ienakute (素直に言えなくて)" is the 45th single by Japanese band Zard. It was released 27 May 2009 under B-Gram Records label.

== Background ==
This is the third and a final posthumous single released after Izumi Sakai's death. It was released on second anniversary of her death.

Sunao ni Ienakute is re-arranged coupling song from their second single Fushigi ne.... It features vocals of Japanese singer-songwriter Mai Kuraki.

Hypnosis is re-arranged coupling song from their 28th single Mind Games. The member of Japanese band Garnet Crow, Hitoshi Okamoto was involved with the whole production of single.

The single wasn't included in any studio album, however it got released in their compilation album Zard Forever Best: 25th Anniversary in 2016.

The single was released in two formats: regular edition and limited edition. Limited edition includes DVD disc with live footage from "What a beautiful memory 2008" of their song Ano Hohoemi wo Wasurenaide.

== Oricon Charting ==
The single reached #5 rank first week. It charted for 8 weeks and sold over 36,000 copies.

== Track list ==
All lyrics are written by Izumi Sakai and arranged by Hitoshi Okamoto; all music is composed by Izumi Sakai (#1) and Hitoshi Okamoto (Garnet Crow) (#2)

No.	Title	Length
1.	"Sunao ni Ienakute (素直に言えなくて)" (~featuring Mai Kuraki~)	4:19
2.	"Hypnosis" (2007 ver.)	4:22
3.	"Sunao ni Ienakute (素直に言えなくて)" (original karaoke)	4:19
