= The Hit Parade (Tak Matsumoto album) =

Studio album by Tak Matsumoto
- Released: November 26, 2003 (physically); September 4, 2024 (digitally)
- Genre: J-pop; Kayōkyoku
- Length: 67:02
- Label: Vermillion Records
- Producer: Tak Matsumoto

Singles from The Hit Parade
- 1. "Ihoujin" Released: 27 August 2003; 2. "Imitation Gold" Released: 8 October 2003

2024 digital album cover

The Hit Parade is a covers album by Tak Matsumoto in conjunction with several guest artists. It was released on 26 November 2003 through Vermillion Records.

== Background ==
The album features cover songs, which were popular during the 1970s and 1980s in the Japan music scene from artists such as Momoe Yamaguchi, Candies, Akina Nakamori or Tatsuro Yamashita.

The album has been performed by young artists from Giza Studio such as Mai Kuraki or Rina Aiuchi, and veterans artist from the 1990s such as Keiko Utoku or Koshi Inaba. Originally 20 songs were recorded, however 17 were included. The recording started in 2002 and ended in 2003.

The album jacket cover visually resembles the album The London Howlin' Wolf Sessions by Howlin' Wolf.

After a fraud scandal with Azumi Uehara is 2003, the album went out of print. However, on 31 December 2018, the album was re-printed and included a limited Kansai version of Koshi Inaba's Minano no Yoko, Yokohama, Yokosuka.

In May 2024, a continuation of the album The Hit Parade IIhas been announced and released on 28 August. On the same release day, it has been announced that first The Hit Parade album will receive digital download from 4 September with "selected 14 tracks", not including 3 tracks from the original release. New artwork for the digital version of the album has been published at the same time.

== Promotion ==
=== Singles ===
The first promotional cover single was Ihoujin, originally performed by Saki Kubota and covered by Zard. The single was released on 27 August 2003. The B-side song includes cover of Ame no Machi wo, originally performed by Arai Yumi and covered by Akiko Matsuda from Ramjet Pulley. In the media, cover version of Ihoujin was broadcast as an insert theme song for Fuji TV television drama Anata no Soba ni Dare ka Iru. The single debuted at number three on the Oricon Weekly Single Charts and charted for sixteen weeks. The single has sold over 155,263 copies. The single was announced in 2003 as the 58th biggest selling single of the year.

The second promotional cover single was Imitation Gold, originally performed by Momoe Yamaguchi and covered by Mai Kuraki. The single was released on 8 October 2003. The B-side song includes cover of Watashi wa Kaze, originally performed by Carmen Maki & Oz and covered by Yuri Nakamura from Garnet Crow. The length of B-side song is over seven minutes, which makes the longest track from cover album. The single debuted at number one on the Oricon Weekly Single Charts. The single has sold over 75,000 copies.

== Chart performance ==
The album debuted at number two on the Oricon Weekly Albums Chart and sold 225,125 copies in its first week. The album was announced in 2004 as the 27th biggest selling album of the year. The album sold more than 450,000 copies. The album has been rewarded with The Best Pop-Rock album of year by Japan Gold Disc Award in 2004.

== Track listing ==
=== CD version ===
No.	Title	Original performer	Length
1.	"Katte ni Shiyagage (勝手にしやがれ)" (by Koshi Inaba)	Kenji Sawada	3:23
2.	"Ihoujin (異邦人)" (by Zard)	Saki Kubota	3:28
3.	"Namida no Taiyou (涙の太陽)" (by Rina Aiuchi)	Emy Jackson	2:37
4.	"Sono Ki ni Sasenaide (その気にさせないで)" (by Aiko Kitahara, Ai Takaoka and Yuuka Saegusa)	Candies	3:07
5.	"Imitation Gold (イミテイション・ゴールド)" (by Mai Kuraki)	Momoe Yamaguchi	3:45
6.	"Minato no Yoko, Yokohama, Yokosuka (港のヨーコ･ヨコハマ･ヨコスカ)" (by Tak Matsumoto)	Down Town Boogie Woogie Band	4:34
7.	"Ame no Machi wo (雨の街を)" (by Akiko Matsuda (Ramjet Pulley))	Yumi Arai	4:58
8.	"Paper Doll" (by Fayray)	Tatsuro Yamashita	3:49
9.	"Ichigo Hakushou wo Mou Ichido (『いちご白書』をもう一度)" (by Akane Sugazaki)	Ban Ban	4:31
10.	"Foggy Night" (by Yumi Shizukusa)	Amii Ozaki	4:05
11.	"Shōjo A (少女A)" (by Azumi Uehara)	Akina Nakamori	3:30
12.	"Byun Byun (ビュン・ビュン)" (by Daria Kawashima)	Gedou	2:12
13.	"Purple Town by (Shiori Takei)" (パープルタウン 〜You Oughta Know By Now〜)	Junko Yagami	3:57
14.	"Toki ni Ai wa (時に愛は)" (by Keiko Utoku)	Off Course	5:24
15.	"SPINNING TOE-HOLD" (instrumental)	Creation	2:46
16.	"Hitori: I stand alone (一人)" (by Jeffrey Qwest)	Takayuki Inoue	3:42
17.	"Watashi wa Kaze (私は風)" (by Yuri Nakamura (Garnet Crow))	Carmen Maki & Oz	7:15

=== Digital version ===
No.	Title	Original performer	Length
1.	"Katte ni Shiyagage (勝手にしやがれ)" (by Koshi Inaba)	Kenji Sawada	3:23
2.	"Ihoujin (異邦人)" (by Zard)	Saki Kubota	3:28
3.	"Sono Ki ni Sasenaide (その気にさせないで)" (by Aiko Kitahara, Ai Takaoka and Yuuka Saegusa)	Candies	3:07
4.	"Imitation Gold (イミテイション・ゴールド)" (by Mai Kuraki)	Momoe Yamaguchi	3:45
5.	"Minato no Yoko, Yokohama, Yokosuka (港のヨーコ･ヨコハマ･ヨコスカ)" (by Tak Matsumoto)	Down Town Boogie Woogie Band	4:34
6.	"Ame no Machi wo (雨の街を)" (by Akiko Matsuda (Ramjet Pulley))	Yumi Arai	4:58
7.	"Paper Doll" (by Fayray)	Tatsuro Yamashita	3:49
8.	"Ichigo Hakushou wo Mou Ichido (『いちご白書』をもう一度)" (by Akane Sugazaki)	Ban Ban	4:31
9.	"Foggy Night" (by Yumi Shizukusa)	Amii Ozaki	4:05
10.	"Byun Byun (ビュン・ビュン)" (by Daria Kawashima)	Gedou	2:12
11.	"Purple Town by (Shiori Takei)" (パープルタウン 〜You Oughta Know By Now〜)	Junko Yagami	3:57
12.	"SPINNING TOE-HOLD" (instrumental)	Creation	2:46
13.	"Hitori: I stand alone (一人)" (by Jeffrey Qwest)	Takayuki Inoue	3:42
14.	"Watashi wa Kaze (私は風)" (by Yuri Nakamura (Garnet Crow))	Carmen Maki & Oz	7:15

== Personnel ==
Credits adapted from the album booklet.

- Tak Matsumoto: guitar, vocal, arrange
- Hideo Yamaki: drum
- Akihito Tokunaga: bass, arrange
- Yoshinobu Ohga: arrange
- Koshi Inaba: Blues Harp
- Akira Onizuka: acoustic piano, organ

== Release history ==
Region	Date	Version	Format	Label	Catalog No.	Ref.
Japan	November 26, 2003	Standard edition	1×CD	Vermillion	BMCV-8009	
Various	September 4, 2024		digital download	Vermillion		
