= Chage and Aska discography =

- Studio albums: 21
- EPs: 1
- Live albums: 3
- Compilation albums: 14
- Tribute albums: 1
- Singles: 55
- Video albums: 26

The discography of the Japanese pop duo Chage and Aska consists of 21 studio albums, 14 compilation albums, 26 video albums and 55 singles. Chage and Aska debuted in 1979 with the single "Hitorizaki", which peaked at number 24 on the Oricon Singles Chart. In 1980, their single "Banri no Kawa" was their first chart hit. Their 1991 single, "Say Yes", which was used as the theme to the Japanese drama The 101st Marriage Proposal (101回目のプロポーズ), sold two million copies and is the sixth best-selling single of all time in Japan. The group had another double million seller in 1993 with "Yah Yah Yah". The group has sold about 31 million records in Japan.

== Albums ==
=== Studio albums ===
List of albums, with selected chart positions
Title	Album details	Peak positions	Sales (Japan)	Certifications
Title	Album details	Japan	Sales (Japan)	Certifications
Kazemai (風舞; "Wind Dance")	Released: April 25, 1980; Label: Warner Pioneer; Format(s): LP, cassette	11	109,000	
Neppū (熱風; "The Hot Wind")	Released: February 25, 1981; Label: Warner Pioneer; Format(s): LP, cassette	1	161,000	
Tasogare no Kishi (黄昏の騎士; "The Knight of Twilight")	Released: February 14, 1982; Label: Warner Pioneer; Format(s): LP, cassette	5	79,000	
Chage and Asuka IV: 21 Seiki (CHAGE&ASUKA IV -21世紀-; "Chage and Asuka: 21 Century")	Released: June 29, 1983; Label: Warner Pioneer; Format(s): LP, cassette	8	80,000	
Inside	Released: March 25, 1984; Label: Warner Pioneer; Format(s): LP, cassette	14	43,000	
Z=One	Released: January 25, 1985; Label: Warner Pioneer; Format(s): LP, cassette	9	49,000	
Turning Point	Released: April 21, 1986; Label: Pony Canyon; Format(s): CD, LP, cassette	4	73,000	
Mix Blood	Released: September 21, 1986; Label: Pony Canyon; Format(s): CD, LP, cassette	3	62,000	
Mr. Asia	Released: May 21, 1987; Label: Pony Canyon; Format(s): CD, LP, cassette	4	26,000	
Rhapsody	Released: March 5, 1988; Label: Pony Canyon; Format(s): CD, LP, cassette	4	128,000	
Energy	Released: September 21, 1988; Label: Pony Canyon; Format(s): CD, LP, cassette	6	49,000	
Pride	Released: August 25, 1989; Label: Pony Canyon; Format(s): CD, LP, cassette	1	301,000	
See Ya	Released: August 29, 1990; Label: Pony Canyon; Format(s): CD, LP, cassette	4	520,000	
Tree	Released: October 1991; Label: Pony Canyon; Format(s): CD, LP, cassette	1	2,351,000	Japan: 2× Million
Guys	Released: November 7, 1992; Label: Pony Canyon; Format(s): CD, LP, cassette	1	1,411,000	Japan: 3× Platinum
Red Hill	Released: October 10, 1993; Label: Pony Canyon; Format(s): CD, LP, cassette	1	1,567,000	Japan: 4× Platinum
Code Name 1 Brother Sun	Released: June 28, 1995; Label: Pony Canyon; Format(s): CD, LP, cassette	1	752,000	Japan: 3× Platinum
Code Name 2 Sister Moon	Released: April 22, 1996; Label: Pony Canyon; Format(s): CD, LP, cassette	2	463,000	Japan: Platinum
No Doubt	Released: August 25, 1999; Label: Warner Pioneer; Format(s): CD, LP, cassette	1	251,000	Japan: Gold
Not At All	Released: December 27, 2001; Label: Universal Music; Format(s): CD, LP, cassette	10	100,000	
Double	Released: January 24, 2007; Label: Universal Music; Format(s): CD, LP, cassette	4	56,000	

=== Extended plays ===
List of albums, with selected chart positions
Title	Album details	Peak positions	Sales (Japan)
Title	Album details	Japan	Sales (Japan)
Snow Mail	Released: December 5, 1986; Label: Warner Pioneer; Format(s): CD, LP, cassette	18	21,000

=== Compilation albums ===
List of albums, with selected chart positions
Title	Album details	Peak positions	Sales (Japan)	Certifications
Title	Album details	Japan	Sales (Japan)	Certifications
Standing Ovation	Released: December 5, 1985; Label: Warner Pioneer; Format(s): CD, LP, cassette	23	26,000	
Super Best	Released: March 5, 1987; Label: Warner Pioneer; Format(s): CD, LP, cassette	11	128,000	
The Story of Ballad	Released: February 7, 1990; Label: Warner Pioneer; Format(s): CD, LP, cassette	2	160,000	
Super Best II	Released: March 25, 1992; Label: Warner Pioneer; Format(s): CD, LP, cassette	1	2,697,000	Japan: 2× Million
Ryanshinchi Gensō Kinen Kashū (倆心知〜原創紀念歌集)	Released: May 17, 1993; Label: Warner Pioneer; Format(s): CD, LP, cassette	—		
Singles: The European Collection	Released: July 22, 1994; Label: Warner Pioneer; Format(s): CD, LP, cassette	—		
Yin & Yang	Released: August 25, 1994; Label: Warner Pioneer; Format(s): CD, LP, cassette	1	693,000	Japan: Platinum
Greatest Hits	Released: January 13, 1998; Label: Warner Pioneer; Format(s): CD, LP, cassette	—		
Duet Angle 20th Anniversary	Released: February 10, 1999; Label: Warner Pioneer; Format(s): CD, LP, cassette	—		
Chage & Aska Very Best Roll Over 20th	Released: December 16, 1999; Label: Warner Pioneer; Format(s): CD, LP, cassette	2	468,000	Japan: Platinum
The Best	Released: January 13, 2004; Label: Warner Pioneer; Format(s): CD, LP, cassette	—		
The Story of Ballad II	Released: November 3, 2004; Label: Yamaha Music; Format(s): CD	22	16,000	
Asian Communications Best	Released: April 23, 2008; Label: Warner Pioneer; Format(s): CD, LP, cassette	—		
Chage and Aska Very Best Nothing But C&A	Released: February 4, 2009; Label: Warner Pioneer; Format(s): CD, LP, cassette	2	53,000	
"—" denotes items which were not released in the region, or items that did not chart.

=== Cover albums ===
List of albums, with selected chart positions
Title	Album details	Peak positions	Sales (Japan)
Title	Album details	Japan	Sales (Japan)
Stamp	Released: November 20, 2002; Label: Universal Music; Format(s): CD	1	163,000

=== Live albums ===
List of albums, with selected chart positions
Title	Album details	Peak positions	Sales (Japan)	Certifications
Title	Album details	Japan	Sales (Japan)	Certifications
Live in Dennen Coliseum: The Natsu Matsuri '81	Released: September 10, 1981; Label: Warner Pioneer; Format(s): LP, cassette, CD	6	61,000	
1983.9.30 Chage & Asuka Live in Yoyogi Stadium	Released: November 16, 1983; Label: Warner Pioneer; Format(s): LP, cassette, CD	17	19,000	
MTV Unplugged Live	Released: October 7, 1996; Label: Pony Canyon; Format(s): CD	1	196,000	Japan: Platinum

=== Soundtrack albums ===
List of albums, with selected chart positions
Title	Album details	Peak positions	Sales (Japan)
Title	Album details	Japan	Sales (Japan)
Atsui Omoi	Released: May 25, 1982; Label: Warner Pioneer; Format(s): LP, cassette, CD	14	33,000

=== Box sets ===
List of albums, with selected chart positions
Title	Album details	Peak positions	Sales (Japan)	Certifications
Title	Album details	Japan	Sales (Japan)	Certifications
CD Box-5	Released: June 21, 1988; Label: Pony Canyon; Format(s): CD	—		
Chage & Aska The Longest Tour Memorial	Released: December 17, 1993; Label: Pony Canyon; Format(s): CD	40	17,000	
Super Best Box Single History 1979–1994 and Snow Mail	Released: December 16, 1994; Label: Pony Canyon; Format(s): CD	1	303,000	Japan: Gold
Chage and Aska 25th Anniversary Box-1	Released: June 23, 2004; Label: Universal Music; Format(s): CD	55	6,000	
Chage and Aska 25th Anniversary Box-2	Released: July 28, 2004; Label: Universal Music; Format(s): CD	50	6,000	
Chage and Aska 25th Anniversary Box-3	Released: August 25, 2004; Label: Universal Music; Format(s): CD	42	8,000	
"—" denotes items which were not released in the region, or items that did not chart.

== Singles ==
=== As lead performers ===
List of singles, with selected chart positions
Title	Year	Peak chart positions		Sales (Japan)	Certifications	Album
Title	Year	Japan Oricon	Japan Billboard Japan Hot 100 (Note: The Japan Hot 100 was established in February 2008.) (Note: Sources for chart positions are as follows: "Love Song", "Yah Yah Yah", and "Say Yes".)	Sales (Japan)	Certifications	Album
"Hitorizaki" (ひとり咲き; "Blooming Alone")	1979	24	—	179,000		Kazemai
"Rurenjōka" (流恋情歌; "Flowing Love Song"")	1980	56	—	23,000		Kazemai
"Banri no Kawa" (万里の河; "Ten Thousand Mile River)	1980	6	—	537,000		Neppū
"Tabibito" (放浪人; "Traveler")	1981	30	—	54,000		Tasogare no Kishi
"Otoko to Onna" (男と女; "Man and Woman")	1981	28	—	90,000		Tasogare no Kishi
"Atsui Omoi" (熱い想い; "Hot Feelings")	1982	51	—	38,000		Atsui Omoi
"Kita Kaze Monogatari" (北風物語; "Story of the North Wind")	1982	27	—	71,000		Atsui Omoi
"Marionette" (マリオネット, Marionetto)	1983	38	—	66,000		Chage and Asuka IV: 21 Seiki
"Hanayaka ni Kizutsuite" (華やかに傷ついて; "Vibrantly in Pain")	1983	46	—	23,000		Inside
"Moon Light Blues"	1984	52	—	30,000		Inside
"Target" (標的(ターゲット), Tāgetto)	1984	38	—	32,000		Z=One
"Yūwaku no Bell ga Naru" (誘惑のベルが鳴る; "The Bell of Temptation Is Ringing")	1985	44	—	14,000		Z=One
"Only Lonely" (オンリー・ロンリー, Onrī Ronrī)	1985	42	—	18,000		Z=One
"Morning Moon" (モーニングムーン, Mōningu Mūn)	1986	11	—	161,000		Turning Point
"Tasogare o Matazuni" (黄昏を待たずに; "Not Waiting for the Twilight")	1986	17	—	45,000		Mix Blood
"Count Down"	1986	20	—	37,000		Non-album single
"Yubiwa ga Naita" (指環が泣いた; "The Ring Cried")	1986	18	—	28,000		Mr. Asia
"Sailor Man"	1987	13	—	67,000		Mr. Asia
"Romancing Yard" (ロマンシングヤード, Romanshingu Yādo)	1987	23	—	18,000		Rhapsody
"Koibito wa Wine-iro" (恋人はワイン色; "Lovers in Wine Red")	1988	16	—	62,000		Rhapsody
"Rhapsody" (ラプソディ, Rapusodi)	1988	22	—	30,000		Rhapsody
"Trip"	1988	14	—	26,000		Energy
"Walk"	1989	20	—	22,000		Pride
"Love Song"	1989	20	89 (Note: Charted in 2014.)	32,000		Pride
"Do Ya Do"	1990	10	—	67,000		See Ya
"Taiyō to Hokori no Naka de" (太陽と埃の中で; "In the Sun and the Dust")	1991	3	—	503,000		See Ya
"Say Yes"	1991	1	35	2,820,000	Japan: 2× Million	Tree
"Boku wa Kono Me de Uso o Tsuku" (僕はこの瞳で嘘をつく; "I Lie with These Eyes")	1991	1	—	811,000		Tree
"Walk" (re-release)	1992	3	—	369,000		Super Best II
"Love Song" (re-release)	1992	1	—	499,000		Super Best II
"If"	1992	1	—	1,083,000		Guys
"No No Darlin'"	1992	2	—	675,000		Guys
"Yah Yah Yah"	1993	1	69	2,419,000	Japan: 2× Million	Red Hill
"Yume no Bannin" (夢の番人; "Dream Guard")	1993	1	—	2,419,000		Red Hill
"Sons and Daughters (Soreyori Boku ga Tsutaetai no wa)" (それより僕が伝えたいのは; "More Than That, What I Want to Say Is...")	1993	1	—	799,000		Red Hill
"You Are Free"	1993	5	—	389,000	Japan: Platinum	Red Hill
"Naze ni Kimi wa Kaeranai" (なぜに君は帰らない; "Why Don't You Return")	1993	4	—	427,000	Japan: Platinum	Red Hill
"Heart"	1994	1	—	1,143,000	Japan: 2× Platinum	Code Name. 1 Brother Sun
"Natural"	1994	1	—	1,143,000	Japan: 2× Platinum	Code Name. 1 Brother Sun
"On Your Mark"	1994	1		1,143,000	Japan: 2× Platinum	Code Name. 2 Sister Moon
"Meguriai" (めぐり逢い; "Meeting by Chance")	1994	1	—	1,252,000	Japan: Million	Code Name. 1 Brother Sun
"Something There"	1995	2	—	569,000	Japan: Platinum	Code Name. 1 Brother Sun
"River"	1996	2	—	389,000	Japan: Platinum	Code Name. 2 Sister Moon
"Kono Ai no Tame ni" (この愛のために; "For this Love")	1999	3	—	121,000	Japan: Gold	No Doubt
"Vision"	1999	3	—	121,000		No Doubt
"Mure" (群れ; "Crowd")	1999	7	—	70,000		No Doubt
"Rocket no Ki no Shita de" (ロケットの樹の下で; "Under the Rocket Tree")	2001	8	—	79,000		Not At All
"Parachute no Heya de" (パラシュートの部屋で; "In the Parachute Room")	2001	6	—	62,000		Not At All
"C-46"	2001	6	—	57,000		Not At All
"Yume no Tsubute" (夢の飛礫; "Dream Throwing Stone")	2001	9	—	43,000		Not At All
"Seamless Singles"	2004	13	—	19,000		Non-album single
"36-dosen (1995 Natsu)" (36度線 -1995夏-, Sanjūroku-dosen Senkyūhyakukyūjūgo Natsu; "36th Parallel (Summer 1995)")	2004	6	—	45,000		Double
"Boku wa Music" (僕はMusic; "I Am Music")	2004	7	—	35,000		Double
"Man and Woman"	2007	2	—	23,000		Double
"Here & There"	2007	3	—	21,000		Double
"—" denotes items which were released before the creation of the Billboard charts, or items that did not chart.

=== As featured artists ===
List of singles, with selected chart positions
Title	Year	Peak chart positions		Sales (Japan)	Certifications	Album
Title	Year	Japan Oricon	Japan Billboard Japan Hot 100 (Note: Sources for chart positions are as follows: "Futari no Ai Land".)	Sales (Japan)	Certifications	Album
"Futari no Ai Land" (ふたりの愛ランド; "Our Love Land") (Chage with Yūko Ishikawa)	1984	3	72 (Note: Charted in 2013.)	438,000		Collections
"Dera Shiera Mu" (デェラ・シエラ・ム) (Chage and Aska with Stardust Revue)	2003	3	—	52,000		Hot Menu
"—" denotes items which were released before the creation of the Billboard charts, or items that did not chart.

== Videography ==
=== Video albums ===
List of media, with selected chart positions
Title	Album details	Peak positions	Certifications
Title	Album details	Japan	Certifications
The Natsu Matsuri: Chage & Asuka Osakajō Live (THE 夏祭り チャゲ&飛鳥 大阪城LIVE)	Released: July 1, 1983; Label: Pioneer; Format(s): VHS	—	
Good Times 1983.9.30 Kokuritsu Yoyogi Kyōgijō Live (GOOD TIMES 1983.9.30 国立代々木競技場LIVE)	Released: April 1, 1984; Label: Pioneer; Format(s): VHS	—	
One Side Game Chage & Asuka in Yokohama Stadium	Released: October 21, 1986; Label: Pioneer; Format(s): VHS	—	
Walk	Released: March 21, 1989; Label: Pioneer; Format(s): VHS	—	
Chage & Asuka History I: 10 Years After	Released: September 6, 1989; Label: Pioneer; Format(s): VHS	—	
Chage & Asuka History II: Pride	Released: March 7, 1990; Label: Pioneer; Format(s): VHS	—	
Taiyō to Hokori no Naka de I (太陽と埃の中で I)	Released: March 21, 1991; Label: Pioneer; Format(s): VHS	—	
Taiyō to Hokori no Naka de II (太陽と埃の中で II)	Released: March 21, 1991; Label: Pioneer; Format(s): VHS	—	
Concert Movie Guys	Released: March 24, 1993; Label: Pioneer; Format(s): VHS, Blu-ray	59	
15th Anniversary On Your Mark	Released: September 21, 1994; Label: Pioneer; Format(s): VHS	—	
Asian Tour in Taipei	Released: March 21, 1996; Label: Pioneer; Format(s): VHS, DVD	—	
Chage & Aska MTV Unplugged Live	Released: October 18, 1996; Label: Pioneer; Format(s): VHS, DVD	—	
Live Best 1995–1999	Released: December 31, 1999; Label: Pioneer; Format(s): DVD	—	
Sennenyaichiya Live: Fukuoka Dome Bokura ga Home (千年夜一夜ライブ 〜福岡ドーム 僕らがホーム〜)	Released: July 12, 2000; Label: Pioneer; Format(s): DVD	—	
Chage and Aska Concert Tour 01>>02 Not At All	Released: April 24, 2002; Label: Pioneer; Format(s): VHS, DVD	—	
Music on Films	Released: March 12, 2003; Label: Pioneer; Format(s): VHS, DVD	—	
Chage and Aska Concert Tour 02-03 The Live	Released: August 6, 2003; Label: Pioneer; Format(s): VHS, DVD, Blu-ray	—	
Chage and Aska Count Down Live 03>>04 in Sapporo Dome	Released: March 31, 2004; Label: Pioneer; Format(s): VHS, DVD, Blu-ray	—	
Chage and Aska 25th Anniversary Special: Chage & Asuka Neppū Concert (CHAGE and ASKA 25th Anniversary Special チャゲ&飛鳥 熱風コンサート)	Released: March 23, 2002; Label: Pioneer; Format(s): DVD, Blu-ray	—	
Chage and Aska Concert Tour 2004 Two-Five	Released: February 1, 2006; Label: Pioneer; Format(s): DVD, Blu-ray	20	
Chage and Aska Concert Tour 2007 Double	Released: August 29, 2007; Label: Pioneer; Format(s): DVD, Blu-ray	3	
Chage and Aska Concert Tour 2007 Alive in Live	Released: May 7, 2008; Label: Pioneer; Format(s): DVD, Blu-ray	5	
Chage and Aska Concert Live DVD Box 1	Released: August 26, 2009; Label: Pioneer; Format(s): DVD	17	
Chage and Aska Concert Live DVD Box 2	Released: September 23, 2009; Label: Pioneer; Format(s): DVD	10	
Chage and Aska Concert Live DVD Box 3	Released: September 23, 2009; Label: Pioneer; Format(s): DVD	9	
Chage and Aska Yume no Bannin Special Events 1993 Guys (CHAGE&ASKA 夢の番人 SPECIAL EVENT 1993 GUYS)	Released: April 25, 2012; Label: Pioneer; Format(s): Blu-ray	20	
"—" denotes items that did not chart, or whose peak positions have not been archived by Oricon.
