= Kimi ga Inai =

Single by Zard

from the album Yureru Omoi
- Released: April 21, 1993
- Genre: Pop rock
- Label: B-Gram Records
- Songwriters: Izumi Sakai, Seiichirou Kuribayashi
- Producer: Daiko Nagato

Zard singles chronology
"Makenaide" (1993)	"Kimi ga Inai" (1993)	"Yureru Omoi" (1993)

"Kimi ga Inai (君がいない)" is the 7th single by Zard and released 21 April 1993 under B-Gram Records label. The single debuted at #2 rank first week. It charted for 15 weeks and sold over 802,000 copies.

== Track list ==
All songs are written by Izumi Sakai, composed by Seiichiro Kuribayashi and arranged by Masao Akashi

1. Kimi ga Inai (君がいない)
  - single and album version (named as B-version) have different arrangements
    - the song was used in Nippon TV drama Kanojo no kiraina Kanojo as theme song
2. Watashi dake Mitsumete (私だけ見つめて)
  - Daria Kawashima and Maki Ohguro are participating in chorus
3. Kimi ga Inai (君がいない) (original karaoke)
4. Watashi dake Mitsumete (私だけ見つめて)(original karaoke)
