= Ai Takaoka =

Ai Takaoka 高岡亜衣
- Born: January 8, 1982 (age 44); Kanagawa, Japan
- Genre: J-pop
- Occupations: singer; songwriter
- Years active: 2003–2011
- Label: Giza Studio
- Website: www.ai-takaoka.com

Ai Takaoka (高岡 亜衣, Takaoka Ai; born 8 January 1982) is a former Japanese pop singer and songwriter under the Giza Studio label.

== Biography ==
Before her solo debut, Ai participated in the cover album "The Hit Parade" covering the song Sono Mama Kinisanaide (by Candies) alongside Giza singers Aiko Kitahara and Yuka Saegusa. Produced by Tak Matsumoto of Japanese rock band B'z.

In 2004 she debuted with single Kimi no Soba de composed by Aika Ohno and produced by Akihito Tokunaga. The most well-known song is "Koi Hanabi" which was produced by Nakano Junko. The song was used as a theme song for Tokyo Broadcasting System Television television drama Kodomo no Jijou. It was later included in two Giza Studio compilation albums as representative song.

In 2007, she performed cover of Field of View's biggest hit Totsuzen on Hill PanKoujou event Being 90's Party along with from NaokI Ko-jin from Naifu.

In 2008 single Gomenne Ima demo Suki de Imasu was her last work which reached into Oricon Weekly Charts, the song was used as an ending theme for television music program Music B.B.

She was active in Giza until 2009. In 2010 she moved to Box Corporation agency under Posuka label.

In 2011 her official blog announced that she was taking a break from music.

== Discography ==
=== Singles ===
No.	Release Day	Title	Rank
1st	2004/2/11	Kimi no Soba de (君の傍で)	132
2nd	2004/3/10	Hikari to Kaze to Kimi no Naka de (光と風と君の中で)	120
3rd	2004/6/16	Jinsei wa Paradise! (人生はParadise!)	144
4th	2004/8/18	Kimi no Egao wo Miru to Ureshiku naru Kimi no Namida wo Miru to Setsunaku naru (君の笑顔を見ると嬉しくなる 君の涙を見ると切なくなる)	147
5th	2005/6/29	Omoide no Natsu ga Kuru (想い出の夏が来る)	X
6th	2005/11/30	Ah Anata ni Ai ni Ikanakya (Ah あなたに会いに行かなきゃ)	195
7th	2006/4/5	Dare ni Iienai Himitsu (誰にも言えない真実（ひみつ）)	187
8th	2007/7/18	Koi Hanabi (こいはなび)	127
9th	2008/4/23	Gomenne, Ima Demo Suki de Imasu (ごめんね、今でも好きで居ます)	196
10th	2008/10/22	Change my life	X
11th	2009/1/14	Hello My Sunshine	X

=== Albums ===
No.	Release Day	Title	Rank
1st	2004/10/2	Sunny	90
2nd	2006/8/23	Acoustic Love	297
3rd	2008/6/25	Fiction	X
4th	2009/4/29	All I Wanna Do	X
5th	2010/9/1	Sunshine Rock	X

== Magazine Interview ==
From Music Freak Magazine:

- Vol.111 2004/February
- Vol.112 2004/March
- Vol.115 2004/June
- Vol.117 2004/August
- Vol.119 2004/October
- Vol.132 2005/November
- Vol.137 2006/April
- Vol.141 2006/August
- Vol.151 2007/August
- Vol.162 2008/June
- Vol.166 2008/October
- Vol.169 2009/January
- Vol.172 2009/April

From Hot Express:

- Takaoka Ai special interview

From J-Groove Magazine:

- August/2005
- May/2006
