= Oh My Love (album) =

Studio album by Zard
- Released: June 4, 1994
- Genre: Pop rock; soft rock
- Length: 48:36
- Label: B-Gram
- Producer: B・M・F

Zard chronology
Yureru Omoi (1993)	Oh My Love (1994)	Forever You (1995)

Singles from OH MY LOVE
- 1. "Mō Sukoshi, Ato Sukoshi..." Released: 4 September 1993; 2. "Kitto Wasurenai" Released: 3 November 1993; 3. "Kono Ai ni Oyogi Tsukarete mo/Boy" Released: 2 February 1994

Oh My Love is the 5th album of Zard and was released on June 4, 1994, under B-Gram Records label.

== Chart performance ==
The album reached #1 rank in its first week of sales. It charted for 75 weeks and sold more than 2,000,000 copies.

== Track listing ==
All lyrics written by Izumi Sakai and arranged by Masao Akashi.

No.	Title	Music	Length
1.	"Oh My Love"	Tetsurō Oda	4:33
2.	"Top Secret"	Seiichiro Kuribayashi	5:11
3.	"Kitto Wasurenai" (きっと忘れない, single and album have different arrangements)	Tetsurō Oda	4:14
4.	"Mō Sukoshi, Ato Sukoshi..." (もう少し あと少し…)	Seiichiro Kuribayashi	4:48
5.	"Ame ni Nurete" (雨に濡れて)	Seiichiro Kuribayashi	4:34
6.	"Kono Ai ni Oyogi Tsukarete mo" (この愛に泳ぎ疲れても)	Tetsurō Oda	4:16
7.	"I Still Remember"	Seiichiro Kuribayashi	6:06
8.	"If You Gimme Smile"	Seiichiro Kuribayashi	4:03
9.	"Rainen no Natsu mo" (来年の夏も)	Seiichiro Kuribayashi	4:33
10.	"Anata ni Kaeritai" (あなたに帰りたい)	Seiichiro Kuribayashi	6:17

== Use in other media ==
- Mō Sukoshi, Ato Sukoshi...: ending theme for TV Asahi drama "Lala Bye Keiji'93"
- Kitto Wasurenai: theme song for drama "Shiratori Reiko de Gozaimasu!"
- Kono Ai ni Oyogi Tsukaretemo: opening theme for drama "Ai to Giwaku no Suspense"
