= Anata wo Kanjiteitai =

Single by Zard

from the album forever you
- Released: December 24, 1994
- Genre: Pop rock; synth-pop
- Label: B-Gram Records
- Songwriters: Izumi Sakai, Tetsurō Oda
- Producer: Daiko Nagato

Zard singles chronology
"Konna ni Soba ni Iru no ni" (1994)	"Anata wo Kanjiteitai" (1994)	"Just Believe in Love" (1995)

"Anata wo Kanjiteitai (あなたを感じていたい)" is the 13th single by Zard and released 24 December 1994 under B-Gram Records label. The single debuted at #2 rank first week. It charted for 10 weeks and sold over 738,000 copies.

== Track listing ==
All songs are written by Izumi Sakai.

1. Anata wo Kanjiteitai (あなたを感じていたい)
  - composer and arrangement: Tetsurō Oda
2. Take Me to Your Dream
  - composer: Daria Kawashima/arrangement: Masao Akashi
3. Anata wo Kanjiteitai (あなたを感じていたい) (original karaoke)
