= Real Thing Shakes =

Single by B'z
- Released: May 15, 1996
- Studio: Cherokee (Los Angeles, California, US); Birdman West (Tokyo, Japan)
- Genre: Hard rock
- Length: 4:12
- Label: Rooms Records
- Composer(s): Tak Matsumoto
- Lyricist(s): Koshi Inaba
- Producer(s): Andy Johns

B'z singles chronology
"Mienai Chikara (Invisible One)/Move" (1996)	"Real Thing Shakes" (1996)	"Fireball" (1997)

"Real Thing Shakes" is the twentieth single by the Japanese rock duo B'z, released on May 15, 1996. The song is one of the band's many number-one singles on the Oricon chart. This is the first B'z single that was not produced by guitarist Tak Matsumoto since "Taiyō no Komachi Angel", instead opting for British producer Andy Johns. It sold over 1,140,000 copies according to Oricon, making it their thirteenth consecutive million-seller single. The band would hold the record for most consecutive million-seller singles for seventeen years until AKB48 broke it in 2013 with their single "Heart Electric". It was used as the theme song for the drama Oretachi ni Ki o Tsukero. It was also the band's first English single.

The song has been cited as one of the band's works that best showcases vocalist Koshi Inaba's wide vocal range.

It is said that the song was recorded as part of an attempt by BMG Japan to break B'z into the American market that never fully materialized.

In 2007, pitcher Daisuke Matsuzaka released a compilation album featuring his favorite songs, titled Music from the Mound, which featured the song.

== Personnel ==
Credits are adapted from the liner notes.

B'z

- Koshi Inaba – vocals
- Tak Matsumoto – guitars

Additional musicians

- Tony Franklin – bass
- Gregg Bissonette – drums

Production

- Andy Johns – production, recording, mixing
- Masayuki Nomura – recording
- Ryoichi Terashima – director
- Eric Janko – assistant engineer
- Keisuke Takakuwa – assistant engineer

== Charts ==
=== Weekly charts ===
Chart (1996)	Peak position
Japan (Oricon)	1

=== Year-end charts ===
Chart (1996)	Position
Japan (Oricon)	12

== Certifications ==
Region	Certification	Certified units/sales
Japan (RIAJ)	3× Platinum	1,200,000^{^}
^{^} Shipments figures based on certification alone.
