= Yureru Omoi (album) =

Studio album by Zard
- Released: July 10, 1993
- Recorded: 1992–1993
- Studio: Studio Birdman (Tokyo); Mod Studio Being
- Genre: Pop rock; pop
- Length: 42:55
- Label: B-Gram
- Producer: Daiko Nagato

Zard chronology
Hold Me (1992)	Yureru Omoi (1993)	Oh My Love (1994)

Singles from Yureru Omoi
- 1. "In My Arms Tonight" Released: 9 September 1992; 2. "Makenaide" Released: 27 January 1993; 3. "Kimi ga Inai" Released: 21 April 1993; 4. "Yureru Omoi" Released: 19 May 1993

Yureru Omoi (揺れる想い, Shifting Feelings) is the fourth album by Zard and was released on July 10, 1993 under B-Gram Records. This is the first original album released in about 10 months since the last album Hold Me. It is also the first album by Izumi Sakai as a solo unit since her first album Good-bye My Loneliness. The release was postponed several times, but was finally released on July 10. In addition, the order form at CD stores indicated that the album title was "Kimi ga Inai" and that it would be released simultaneously with the single "Yureru Omoi" on May 19.

Commercially, Yureru Omoi was a great success. It was her first album to debut at number one on the Oricon Albums Chart and became Japan's best-selling album for 1993. It is her most successful work in her entire career. The success of this album has also had a synergistic effect, with Sakai's previous three original albums also making a comeback within the Oricon charts. The album includes her biggest hits such as "Makenaide" and "Yureru Omoi."

== Background ==
The lead single "In My Arms Tonight" was released on September 9, 1992. It achieved success in Japan, peaking at number nine on the Oricon Singles Chart. "Makenaide" was released on January 27, 1993, and became her biggest hit, peaking at number one on the Oricon chart and selling over 1.64 million copies. When Sakai passed, it was elected as the best song by Zard on the Oricon polls. "Kimi ga Inai" was released as the album's third single on April 21, 1993; the single debuted at number 2, charted for 15 weeks and sold over 802,000 copies. The album's title track was released as the final single on May 19, 1993. The single debuted at number one and sold over 1,396,000 copies and became the second highest-selling single in her career.

Yureru Omoi was recorded between 1992 and 1993 at the now-demolished Studio Birdman in Tokyo, Japan and Mod Studio Being. The album was mastered by Yuka Koizumi. The album cover is a headshot of Sakai wearing a purple shirt that was photographed by Shinji Hosono.

== Chart performance ==
The album was a huge success in Japan. It debuted at number one on the Oricon Albums Chart with 571,020 copies sold, making it her first chart-topping album. The album stayed at the top for five nonconsecutive weeks, being knocked off of number one in its third week by Misato Watanabe's Big Wave. It charted for 56 weeks, selling 2,230,900 copies by the end of its chart run. In 1993, it was the highest sold album with 1,938,120 copies sold throughout the whole year. It sold an additional 300,048 copies in 1994, becoming the 53rd best-selling album of the following year.

== Track listing ==
All lyrics written by Izumi Sakai.

No.	Title	Music	Arrangers	Length
1.	"Yureru Omoi" (揺れる想い)	Tetsurō Oda	Masao Akashi	4:28
2.	"Season"	Seiichiro Kuribayashi	Masao Akashi	4:06
3.	"Kimi ga Inai" (君がいない, single and album have different arrangements)	Seiichiro Kuribayashi	Masao Akashi	3:58
4.	"In My Arms Tonight"	Michiya Haruhata	Masao Akashi	4:23
5.	"Anata wo Suki dakedo" (あなたを好きだけど)	Seiichiro Kuribayashi	Masao Akashi	4:27
6.	"Makenaide" (負けないで)	Tetsurō Oda	Takeshi Hayama	3:48
7.	"Listen to Me"	Daria Kawashima	Masao Akashi	3:54
8.	"You and Me (and...)"	Tetsurō Oda	Takeshi Hayama	4:36
9.	"I Want You"	Seiichiro Kuribayashi	Masao Akashi	4:22
10.	"Futari no Natsu" (二人の夏)	Seiichiro Kuribayashi	Masao Akashi	4:53

== Usage in media ==
- In My Arms Tonight: theme song for Tokyo Broadcasting System Television drama "Gakkou ga Abunai"
- Makenaide: ending theme for Fuji TV drama "Shiratori Reiko de Gozaimasu!"
- Kimi ga Inai: theme song for Nihon TV drama "Kanojo no Kiraina Kanojo"
- Yureru Omoi: commercial song of Pocari Sweat
- Anata wo Suki dakedo: commercial song of "Mitsubishi Oil Co"

== Charts ==
=== Weekly charts ===
Chart (1993–1994)	Peak position
Japanese Albums (Oricon)	1

=== Year-end charts ===
Chart (1993)	Position
Japanese Albums (Oricon)	1

2000 year-end charts for First Love
Chart (1994)	Position
Japanese Albums (Oricon)	53

=== Decade-end charts ===
Chart (1990–1999)	Position
Japanese Albums (Oricon)	42

=== All-time chart ===
Chart	Position
Japanese Albums (Oricon)	61

== Certification and sales ==
Region	Certification	Certified units/sales
Japan (RIAJ)	2× Million	2,230,900
