= Mienai Chikara (Invisible One)/Move =

"Mienai Chikara ~Invisible One~ / Move"

Single by B'z
- Released: March 6, 1996
- Genre: Hard rock
- Label: BMG Japan
- Songwriters: Koshi Inaba, Tak Matsumoto
- Producer: Tak Matsumoto

B'z singles chronology
"Love Phantom" (1995)	"Mienai Chikara ~Invisible One~ / Move" (1996)	"Real Thing Shakes" (1996)

"Mienai Chikara ~Invisible One~ / Move" is the nineteenth single and first Double A-side by B'z, released on March 6, 1996. The release is one of the band's many number-one singles in the Oricon chart. "Mienai Chikara ~Invisible One~" was used as the first ending theme of anime series Hell Teacher Nūbē. It sold over 1,236,000 copies according to Oricon.

== Track listing ==
1. Mienai Chikara ~Invisible One~ (ミエナイチカラ ~Invisible One~)
2. Move

== Certifications ==
Region	Certification	Certified units/sales
Japan (RIAJ)	3× Platinum	1,200,000^{^}
^{^} Shipments figures based on certification alone.
