= Calling (B'z song) =

Single by B'z

from the album Survive
- Released: July 9, 1997
- Genre: Hard rock
- Label: Rooms
- Songwriters: Koshi Inaba; Tak Matsumoto
- Producer: Tak Matsumoto

B'z singles chronology
"Fireball" (1997)	"Calling" (1997)	"Liar! Liar!" (1997)

"Calling" is a twenty-second single by B'z, released on July 9, 1997. The song is one of B'z's many number-one singles on the Oricon chart. The song was used as the theme for the TV drama Glass Mask, an adaptation of the famous shōjo manga of the same name. It sold 1,000,020 copies, according to Oricon.

== Track listing ==
1. "Calling"
2. "Gimme Your Love" (live at Tokyo Dome)

== Certifications ==
Region	Certification	Certified units/sales
Japan (RIAJ)	Million	1,000,000^{^}
^{^} Shipments figures based on certification alone.
