= Kono Ai ni Oyogi Tsukarete mo/Boy =

Single by Zard

from the album Oh My Love
- Released: February 2, 1994
- Genre: Pop rock
- Label: B-Gram Records
- Songwriters: Tetsurō Oda, Izumi Sakai
- Producer: Daiko Nagato

Zard singles chronology
"Kitto Wasurenai" (1993)	"Kono Ai ni Oyogi Tsukarete mo/Boy" (1994)	"Konna ni Soba ni Iru no ni" (1994)

"Kono Ai ni Oyogi Tsukarete mo/Boy (この愛に泳ぎ疲れても/Boy)" is the 11th single by Zard and released 2 February 1994 under B-Gram Records label. The single debuted at #1 rank first week. It charted for 15 weeks and sold over 887,000 copies.

In contrast to the heavy bass and electric guitar arrangement of "Kono Ai Ni Oyogi Tsukarete mo," the double A-side track "Boy" is a soft rock song. The track features a quieter acoustic arrangement compared to the lead single and has been included on several of ZARD's compilation albums.

== Track list ==
All songs are written by Izumi Sakai and arranged by Masao Akashi

1. Kono Ai ni Oyogi Tsukarete mo (この愛に泳ぎ疲れても)
  - composer: Tetsurō Oda
    - the song was used in Fuji TV drama Ai to Giwaku no Suspense as opening song
2. Boy
  - composer: Seiichiro Kuribayashi
    - the song was used in Yomiuri TV program Natsu no Niwa The Friends as ending song
3. Kono Ai ni Oyogi Tsukarete mo (この愛に泳ぎ疲れても)(original karaoke)
4. Boy (original karaoke)
