= Daria Kawashima =

Daria Kawashima 川島だりあ
- Also known as: Miki Kawashima
- Born: 11 February 1965 (age 61); Sagamihara, Japan
- Genres: Japanese pop rock
- Occupations: singer-songwriter composer lyricist
- Years active: 1983–present
- Label: Zain Records

Daria Kawashima (川島だりあ, Kawashima Daria; born 21 March 1967), known before as Miki Kawashima, is a Japanese musical composer, singer-songwriter, lyricist under Being Inc. records.

== Biography ==
In 1986, she debuted as Miki Kawashima with the single Silk no Kuchibiru under CBS Sony label. Three years, she debuted as Daria Kawashima with the single Shiny Day under the Zain Records label. Since joining the Being agency, Kawashima has composed and wrote several songs for artists like Zard and Deen. In 1992, she composed Moonlight Densetsu under the alias of Tetsuya Komuro, presumably inspired by the legendary songwriter of the same name. The song would later be used as an opening theme for the popular anime series Sailor Moon. Kawashima also became known as the vocalist and leader of the heavy metal band Feel So Bad. In 2003, she participated in the cover album The Hit Parade, covering Gedō's Hyun Hyun. It was produced by Tak Matsumoto from B'z. In 2016, she made her return as a solo artist with the digital release of her album Life Now.

Some of her music video clips are included in musicvideo DVD series 90s Being Rock Hits.

== Discography ==
During her solo career as Daria Kawashima she released four singles, 2 studio, 1 digital and 1 compilation album.

=== Singles ===
- Shiny Day (1991)
- Don't Look Back (1991)
- Get it On (1992)
- Kanashiki Jiyuu no Hate ni (悲しき自由の果てに) (1992)

=== Studio albums ===
- Believin' myself (1991)
- Don't Look Back (1992)

=== Compilation album ===
- complete of Kawashima Daria & FEEL SO BAD at the BEING studio (2003)

=== Digital album ===
- LIFE=NOW (2016)

== List of provided works as a lyricist ==
=== Sakurakko Club ===
- Nani ga Nandemo

=== B.B.Queens ===
- I remember you

=== Mi-ke ===
- Moon na Kimochi wa Osenchi
- Oh My Sweet Heart

=== Deen ===
- Omoikiri Waratte
- Eien wo Azuketekurete
- Twelve
- Mou Nakanaide

=== Band-Maid ===
- Freezer
- Don't Apply the Brake
- Beauty and the Beast

== List of provided works as a composer ==
=== Zard ===
- Forever (Mou Sagasanai)
- Ano Hohoemi wo Wasurenai de, Why Don't You Leave Me Alone, Ai wa Nemutteru, So Together (Hold Me)
- Listen to Me (Yureru Omoi)
- Stray Love
- Take Me to Your Dream
- Ready, Go!

=== Mi-ke ===
- Ano Hi no I Love you

=== Yumiko Morishita ===
- Tears
- Somebody to Believe

=== Key West Club ===
- Oaetsurae no Destiny
- Silent Beach
- Yume wa Majorika Senorita

=== Dali ===
- Moonlight Densetsu

=== Wands ===
- Kodoku he no Target (Toki no Tobira)
- Don't Cry (Little Bit…)

=== T-Bolan ===
- Heart of Gold

=== Baad ===
- Dakishimetai Mou Ichido

=== Twinzer ===
- DON'T FORGET YOU

=== Noriko Sakai ===
- Here I am: Nakitai toki wa Nakeba ii

=== Azumi Uehara ===
- Precious Days
- Fly Away
- Solitude
- Mask
- Endless World
- One's Love, ask me, Deep Black, Clash! Clash! (Mushoku)
- Never Free
- Song for you
- U&I (Ikitakuwanai Bokura)

=== Hayami Kishimoto ===
- SAY GOOD BYE GLOOMY DAYS
- Konya wa Kaeranai
- Domino

=== Sparkling Point ===
- South Point

=== The Tambourines ===
- Star (My Back Pages)

=== Rina Aiuchi ===
- Rainbow
- NAVY BLUE
- Rosemary
- I can't stop my love for you♥
- crystal pearl
- Alright
- Rock Steady
- Playgirl
- Neverending Winter
- Thanx

=== Miki Matsuhashi ===
- Itsumademo Ai wo Tsutumou

=== U-ka Saegusa in dB ===
- It's for you
- Hirari Yume Ichiya

=== Aiko Kitahara ===
- Sayonara wo Ageta Hi ga Chikasugite (Piece of Love)
- Love is blind?! (Message)
- Sono Egao yo Eien ni

=== Aya Kamiki ===
- ShooBidooBiBa, Because I close to you

=== NMB48 ===
- With my soul

== List of provided works as both lyricist and composer ==
=== Zard ===
- Koi Onna no Yūutsu, Onna de Itai (Good-bye My Loneliness)

=== Manish ===
- Kirameku Toki ni Torawarete

=== Aiko Yanagihara ===
- Don't let met down

=== Keiko Utoku ===
- Kirei da to Ittekureta

=== T-Bolan ===
- Kanashimi ga Itaiyo

== Television appearances ==
Music Station:

- Kanashiki Jiyuu no Hate ni
- Baribari Saikyou No.1 (Feel so Bad)
