= Fushigi ne... =

Single by Zard

from the album Mō Sagasanai
- Released: June 25, 1991
- Genre: Pop rock; folk rock
- Label: B-Gram Records
- Songwriter(s): Izumi Sakai, Tetsurō Oda
- Producer(s): Daiko Nagato

Zard singles chronology
"Good-bye My Loneliness (single)" (1991)	"Fushigi ne..." (1991)	"Mō Sagasanai" (1991)

"Fushigi ne... (不思議ね…)" is the 2nd single by Zard and released on June 25, 1991 under B-Gram Records label. The single debuted at #30 rank first week. It charted for 5 weeks and sold over 31,000 copies.

== Track list ==
All songs are written by Izumi Sakai and arranged by Masao Akashi

1. Fushigi ne... (不思議ね…)
  - composer: Tetsurō Oda
2. Sunao ni Ienakute (素直に言えなくて)
  - composer: Izumi Sakai
  - for first time Izumi Sakai composed song on her own
    - in 2009, it was released as 45th single with collaborated chorus by Mai Kuraki
