= Zard Best Request: 35th Anniversary =

Greatest hits album by Zard
- Released: February 10, 2025
- Genre: J-pop
- Length: Disc 1 44:02; Disc 2 54:16; Disc 3 59:51
- Label: Being Inc.
- Producer: Daiko Nagato

Zard chronology
Zard Forever Best: 25th Anniversary (2016)	Zard Best Request: 35th Anniversary (2025)

Zard Best Request: 35th Anniversary is a compilation album by Japanese pop band Zard. It was released on 10 February 2025 under B-Gram Records.

== Background ==
The album was released on the same day as Zard debut single Good-bye My Loneliness. This album includes 3 CDs with tracks voted upon by Zard's fans via an online public vote.

All the tracks went through new digital remastering processes which took advantage of improved hardware and AI. This new remaster of Zard's hits was done by Shimada Katsuhiro, the CEO of BIRDMAN MASTERING Co. Ltd. who was the recording engineer throughout Zard's career.

== Versions ==
Each version of Zard Best Request: 35th Anniversary includes three Blu-spec CD2 discs.

Edition	Contents
Regular Edition	3CD
Regular Edition	3CD + Mega Jacket
Limited Edition	3CD + Memorial Acrylic Photo Block
Limited Edition	3CD + Memorial Acrylic Photo Block + Mega Jacket
Musing Limited Edition	3CD + Memorial Acrylic Word Block

== Track listing ==
=== Disc 1 ===
No.	Title	Length
1.	"Kokoro wo hiraite"	4:15
2.	"Ano hohoemi wo wasurenaide"	3:49
3.	"My friend"	4:34
4.	"Yureru omoi"	4:29
5.	"Don't you see!"	5:03
6.	"Makenaide"	3:49
7.	"Iki mo dekinai"	4:37
8.	"Kimi ni aitakunattara…"	3:50
9.	"Oh my love"	4:33
10.	"Tōi hi no Nostalgia"	5:49

=== Disc 2 ===
No.	Title	Length
11.	"Kakegae no nai mono"	4:15
12.	"Eien"	3:49
13.	"Good-bye My Loneliness"	4:34
14.	"DAN DAN Kokoro hikareteku"	4:31
15.	"Kitto wasurenai"	4:07
16.	"Natsu wo matsu sail (ho) no you ni"	4:33
17.	"Today is another day"	5:16
18.	"Nemurenai yoru wo daite"	4:26
19.	"Forever you"	4:42
20.	"Rainen no natsu mo"	4:33
21.	"Unmei no roulette mawashite"	5:19
22.	"Sukina you ni odoritai no"	4:23

=== Disc 3 ===
No.	Title	Length
23.	"IN MY ARMS TONIGHT"	4:21
24.	"My Baby Grand ～Nukumori ga hoshikute～"	4:13
25.	"Anata wo kanjiteitai"	5:11
26.	"Shōjo no koro ni modottamitai ni"	5:12
27.	"Ame ni nurete"	4:34
28.	"Totsuzen"	4:35
29.	"Tomatteita tokei ga ima ugokidashita"	4:12
30.	"Season"	4:07
31.	"Kono ai ni oyogitsukaretemo"	4:18
32.	"Mou sukoshi ato sukoshi…"	4:51
33.	"Sayonara wa ima mo kono mune ni imasu"	5:07
34.	"Ai ga mienai"	4:05
35.	"Tōi hoshi wo kazoete"	5:09

== Use in other media ==
- Kokoro wo aite: Pocari Sweat CM song
- Ano hohoemi wo wasurenaide:Fuji TV Friday Entertainment "Rolled-up Nurse Story Series" Theme song
- My friend: Ending theme for the TV Asahi anime "Slam Dunk"
- Yureru omoi: Pocari Sweat CM song
- Don't you see!: Ending theme for the Fuji TV anime "Dragon Ball GT"
- Makenaide: Ending theme for Fuji TV drama "Shiratori Reiko desu ka!", Entrance march for the 66th National High School Baseball Championship
- Iki mo dekinai: Opening theme for the Fuji TV anime "Chinese Cuisine Master!"
- Kimi ni aitakunattara...: Theme song for the TBS drama "Ideal Marriage"
- Kakegae no nai mono: Theme song for "Koisuru Hanikami!"
- Eien: Theme song for "Lost Paradise", Canon "NEW EOS Kiss" CM song
- Good-bye My Loneliness: Theme song for Fuji TV drama "The Ideal and Reality of Marriage"
- DAN DAN Kokoro hikareteku: Self cover originally performed by Field of View
- Kitto wasurenai: Ending theme for Fuji TV drama "Shiratori Reiko desu ka!"
- Natsu wo matsu sail (ho) no you ni: Theme song for the movie "Detective Conan: Strategy Above the Horizon"
- Today is another day: "YAWARA! Special ~Always About You..." Theme song
- Nemurenai yoru wo daite: Ending theme for TV Asahi's "Tonight"
- Forever you: Theme song for the movie "Princess Diana" (2022)
- Unmei no roulette mawashite: Opening theme for the TV anime "Detective Conan"
- IN MY ARMS TONIGHT: Theme song for the TBS drama "School is in Danger"
- My Baby Grand ～Nukumori ga hoshikute～: DoCoMo '97-Winter CF Song
- Anata wo kanjiteitai: NTT DoCoMo pager "Parfy V" CM song
- Shōjo no koro ni modottamitai ni: Theme song for the movie "Detective Conan: The 14th Target"
- Tomatteita tokei ga ima ugokidashita: Theme song for the TV Asahi drama "Objection! Female Lawyer Ooka Norie"
- Kono ai ni oyogitsukaretemo: Opening theme for Kansai TV/Fuji TV's "Suspense of Love and Suspicion"
- Mou sukoshi ato sukoshi...: Ending theme for TV Asahi drama "Lullaby Detective '93"
- Sayonara wa ima mo kono mune ni imasu: Theme song for our movie series "I'm Reiko Shiratori!", Ending theme for J-ROCK ARTIST Count Down 50
- Ai ga mienai: SEA BREEZE '95 Theme song
- Tōi hoshi wo kazoete: MBS Drama Special Zone "Nishi-Ogikubo Mitsuboshi Youshu-do" Ending Theme Song (2021)
