= Liar! Liar! =

Single by B'z

from the album Survive
- Released: October 8, 1997
- Genre: Hard rock
- Label: Rooms
- Songwriter(s): Tak Matsumoto; Koshi Inaba
- Producer(s): Tak Matsumoto

B'z singles chronology
"Calling" (1997)	"Liar! Liar!" (1997)	"Samayoeru Aoi Dangan" (1998)

"Liar! Liar!" is the twenty-third single by B'z, released on October 8, 1997. This song is one of B'z many number-one singles on the Oricon chart, selling 794,000 copies during its chartrun.

"Liar! Liar!" was featured in the PlayStation 2 music video game GuitarFreaks. Marty Friedman, ex-Megadeth guitarist who is acquainted with J-pop, stated that this song is one of his favorites in a column he wrote for the magazine Nikkei Entertainment.

== Track listing ==
All songs composed and arranged by Tak Matsumoto, lyrics written by Koshi Inaba

1. "Liar! Liar!"
2. "Biri Biri (ビリビリ)"

== Personnel ==
- Tak Matsumoto - Electric guitar
- Koshi Inaba - Lead vocals
- Akihito Tokunaga - Bass
- Hideo Yamaki - Drums

== Certifications ==
Region	Certification	Certified units/sales
Japan (RIAJ)	Million	1,000,000^{^}
^{^} Shipments figures based on certification alone.
