= Konna ni Soba ni Iru no ni =

Single by Zard

from the album forever you
- Released: August 8, 1994
- Genre: Dance-rock
- Label: B-Gram Records
- Songwriter(s): Izumi Sakai, Seiichiro Kuribayashi
- Producer(s): Daiko Nagato

Zard singles chronology
"Kono Ai ni Oyogi Tsukarete mo/Boy" (1994)	"Konna ni Soba ni Iru no ni" (1994)	"Anata wo Kanjiteitai" (1994)

"Konna ni Soba ni Iru no ni (こんなにそばに居るのに)" is the 12th single by Zard and released 8 August 1994 under B-Gram Records label. The single debuted at #1 rank first week. It charted for 12 weeks and sold over 788,000 copies.

== Track listing ==
All songs are written by Izumi Sakai, composed by Seiichiro Kuribayashi and arranged by Masao Akashi

1. Konna ni Soba ni Iru no ni (こんなにそばに居るのに)
2. Anata No Sei Ja nai (あなたのせいじゃない)
  - this is last single song where Masao Akashi participated as arranger
3. Konna ni Soba ni Iru no ni (こんなにそばに居るのに) (original karaoke)
  - till 14th single, there won't be karaoke for coupling songs.
