= Fireball (B'z song) =

Single by B'z

from the album Survive
- Released: March 5, 1997
- Genre: Hard rock
- Label: BMG Japan
- Songwriters: Koshi Inaba, Tak Matsumoto
- Producer: Tak Matsumoto

B'z singles chronology
"Real Thing Shakes" (1996)	"Fireball" (1997)	"Calling" (1997)

"Fireball" is the twenty-first single by B'z, released on March 5, 1997. One of B'z' many number-one singles in the Oricon chart, it was their first single since Itoshii Hitoyo Good Night... not to sell over one million copies, with 755,000 copies sold. It also became their first single since Itoshii Hitoyo Good Night... not to chart in the yearly top 20, charting at #24.

== Track listing ==
1. Fireball
2. Kanashiki Dreamer (哀しきDreamer)

== Certifications ==
Region	Certification	Certified units/sales
Japan (RIAJ)	Million	1,000,000^{^}
^{^} Shipments figures based on certification alone.
