= Nemurenai Yoru wo Daite =

Single by Zard

from the album Hold Me
- Released: August 5, 1992
- Genre: Pop rock; folk rock
- Label: B-Gram Records
- Songwriter(s): Izumi Sakai, Tetsurō Oda
- Producer(s): Daiko Nagato

Zard singles chronology
"Mō Sagasanai" (1991)	"Nemurenai Yoru wo Daite" (1992)	"In My Arms Tonight" (1992)

"Nemurenai Yoru wo Daite" (眠れない夜を抱いて, lit. "Embracing the Sleepless Nights") is the 4th single by Zard and released 5 August 1992 under B-Gram Records label. Zard made their first public debut with this song in TV program Music Station three times. The single peaked at #8 rank on the Oricon charts. It charted for 17 weeks and sold over 458,000 copies. The single entered into top 10 ranks for first time after debut single Good-bye My Loneliness.

== Track list ==
All songs are written by Izumi Sakai.

1. "Nemurenai Yoru wo Daite" (眠れない夜を抱いて, "Embracing the Sleepless Nights")
  - composer: Tetsurō Oda/arrangement: Masao Akashi and Daisuke ikeda
    - the song was used in TV Asahi program Tonight as ending theme
2. "Dangerous Tonight"
  - composer: Seiichirou Kuribayashi/arrangement: Akashi
3. "Nemurenai Yoru wo Daite" (Original Karaoke)
4. "Dangerous Tonight" (Original Karaoke)
