= Love Phantom =

Single by B'z

from the album Loose
- Released: October 11, 1995
- Genre: Hard rock
- Label: BMG Japan
- Songwriters: Koshi Inaba, Tak Matsumoto
- Producer: Tak Matsumoto

B'z singles chronology
"Love Me, I Love You" (1995)	"Love Phantom" (1995)	"Mienai Chikara (Invisible One)/Move" (1996)

"Love Phantom" is the eighteenth single by B'z, released on October 11, 1995. This song is one of B'z many number-one singles in Oricon chart. The song was used as ending theme for The X-Files during the height of its popularity in Japan. The single sold over 950,000 copies within one week. It sold over 1,862,000 copies according to Oricon. The song won "the best five single award" at the 10th Japan Gold Disc Award.

In 2011, the song was certified digitally by the RIAJ as a gold single for being downloaded more than 100,000 times to cellphones since its release as a digital download in early 2005.

B'z became also the first artist to have at least one single charted in the yearly top 10 for five consecutives years. This record was broken by Mr. Children in 2008 (6 years).

== Track listing ==
1. Love Phantom
2. Fushidara 100%

== Personnel ==
- Tak Matsumoto - Electric guitar
- Koshi Inaba - Lead vocals
- Denny Fongheiser - Drums
- Masao Akashi - Bass guitar
- Daisuke Ikeda - Manipulator
- Takanobu Masuda - Organ, Moog
- Keiko Utoku- Female voice
- Naoko Iijima - Female voice
- Akemi Mori - Soprano voice
- Shinozaki Strings - Strings

== Certifications ==
Region	Certification	Certified units/sales
Japan (RIAJ)	4× Platinum	1,862,050
Japan (RIAJ) digital sales	Platinum	250,000^{*}
^{*} Sales figures based on certification alone.
