= Negai (B'z song) =

Single by B'z

from the album Loose
- Released: May 31, 1995
- Genre: Jazz rock
- Label: BMG Japan
- Songwriters: Koshi Inaba; Tak Matsumoto
- Producer: Tak Matsumoto

B'z singles chronology
"Motel" (1994)	"Negai" (1995)	"Love Me, I Love You" (1995)

"Negai" (ねがい, "Wish") is the sixteenth single by B'z, released on May 31, 1995. This song is one of B'z many number-one singles on the Oricon chart. It sold over 1,498,000 copies according to Oricon.

A re-recorded version of the song appears on the album Loose. It differs from the single version in that it has an extended piano intro, a longer guitar solo and a new, more abrupt ending.

== Track listing ==
1. "Negai" (ねがい)
2. "You & I"

== Certifications ==
Region	Certification	Certified units/sales
Japan (RIAJ)	3× Platinum	1,200,000^{^}
^{^} Shipments figures based on certification alone.
