= Survive (B'z album) =

Studio album by B'z
- Released: November 19, 1997
- Recorded: 1996–1997
- Genre: Hard rock; blues rock
- Length: 49:59
- Label: Rooms Records
- Producer: Tak Matsumoto

B'z chronology
Loose (1995)	Survive (1997)	Brotherhood (1999)

Singles from Survive
- 1. "Fireball" Released: March 5, 1997; 2. "Calling" Released: July 9, 1997; 3. "Liar! Liar!" Released: October 8, 1997

Survive is the ninth studio album by Japanese rock duo B'z, released November 19, 1997. The album sold 1,040,160 copies in its first week, lower than their last studio album, but still managed to sell over 1,723,030 copies.

== Track listing ==
1. Deep Kiss - 4:14
2. Suima-Yo!! (スイマーよ！！) - 3:18
3. Survive - 4:48
4. Liar! Liar! - 3:22
5. Hapinesu (Happiness) (ハピネス) - 4:51
6. Fireball - 4:15
7. Do Me - 3:28
8. Naite Naite Nakiyandara (泣いて泣いて 泣きやんだら) - 3:37
9. Cat - 3:42
10. Dattara Agechaeyo (だったらあげちゃえよ) - 3:51
11. Shower - 4:37
12. Calling - 5:56

== Certifications ==
Region	Certification	Certified units/sales
Japan (RIAJ)	2× Million	2,000,000^{^}
^{^} Shipments figures based on certification alone.
