= Detective Conan: Full Score of Fear =

- Theatrical release poster
- Kanji: 名探偵コナン 戦慄の楽譜(フルスコア)
- Revised Hepburn: Meitantei Konan: Senritsu no Furu Sukoa
- Directed by: Yasuichiro Yamamoto
- Written by: Kazunari Kochi
- Based on: Case Closed by Gosho Aoyama
- Produced by: Kazunari Kochi
- Starring: Minami Takayama; Kappei Yamaguchi; Akira Kamiya; Wakana Yamazaki; Megumi Hayashibara; Hōko Kuwashima; Naoko Matsui; Yukiko Iwai; Ikue Ohtani; Wataru Takagi; Eisuke Yoda; Nobuo Tanaka; Kousuke Meguro; Yūko Mizutani; Kenichi Ogata; Atsuko Yuya; Kazuhiko Inoue; Chafurin
- Cinematography: Etsushi Masuda; Tomio Yoshikawa
- Edited by: Terumitsu Okada
- Music by: Katsuo Ono; Masakazu Yokoyama; Aki Yokoyama; Keiko Urakami
- Production company: TMS Entertainment
- Distributed by: Toho
- Release date: April 19, 2008
- Running time: 115 minutes
- Country: Japan
- Language: Japanese
- Box office: ¥ 2.42 billion (US$ 24.5 million)

Detective Conan: Full Score of Fear (名探偵コナン 戦慄の楽譜(フルスコア), Meitantei Konan: Senritsu no Furu Sukoa) is the 2008 Japanese animated musical mystery film and the twelfth film installment of the Case Closed manga and anime franchise. The initial screening of the film was scheduled on April 19, 2008.

An OVA, which takes place three years earlier, was released specially for the film and later released on DVD as Magic File #2.

== Plot ==
At Domoto Music Academy, a violinist named Soko Wakabe is observing two students during a practice while she sends a message on her cellphone and the explosion occurs, injuring Wakabe and killing students. Elsewhere, an unknown person reads the news on the computer and comments on how he is getting closer to his plan of a "Silent Night."

Later, on the grounds outside the academy, Conan Edogawa talks to Ran Mouri on the phone as Shinichi Kudo. He investigates and sees an old man who is the former piano tuner turned director of the Domoto Concert Hall named Takumi Fuwa carefully picking up a piano key from the piano destroyed in the explosion and putting it in his pocket before leaves in a car. Ran invites him to go to a rehearsal with her at the concert hall that is opening soon. He declines and tells her she's meddling too much which causes her to angrily reply that he will never be like Sherlock Holmes because he's tone deaf and Ran angrily hangs up.

At the rehearsal; Kogoro, Ran, Sonoko Suzuki, and the Detective Boys are introduced to the person who will be performing for the Domoto Concert Hall opening; the organist and former pianist Kazuki Domoto, Fuwa, German professional organ tuner Hans Müller, son of Kazuki and pianist Genya, soprano Rara Chigusa, violinist Shion Yuhane, and the main soprano Reiko Akiba. The Detective Boys help Akiba to help their class choir to sing their school anthem. She agreed but asked them to leave immediately, possibly to allow Shion, who is shy, to perform without fear.

The next day, Ran plays the piano while the kids sing the Teitan Elementary School anthem. Akiba comments on their performance; Genta Kojima is too loud, Mitsuhiko Tsuburaya is not putting enough feelings into it as he was staring at Ai Haibara, Ai is singing like an adult, Ayumi Yoshida is perfect, and Conan is off-key the whole time. He is revealed later to have a perfect pitch. Genta steals a drink of Akiba's tea and suffers in agonizing pain. At the hospital, the doctor says that Genta's throat is severely inflamed by chemicals, and he will not be able to speak for about four days. The Detective Boys, Sonoko, and Akiba accompany Genta home. On the way home, they are chased by a truck, so at one of the turns, Akiba takes a different route to get the truck away from them. She trips and is about to be run over until a taxi comes and the car turns, only for the culprit to escape.

Later, two more murders occur. One explosion kills Osamu Shida, with the foot joint of a flute left on the scene. The other murder occurs when the paraglider of the victim is cut with fine cuts to cause it to plunge from mid-air. In the victim's car is the headjoint of the flute. These 2 victims, together with the 2 dead victims from the earlier explosion, formerly belonged to a group called the Quarter Quintet. Conan, indebted to Akiba for a reason he has forgotten, follows her to the forest as she is known to relax there on the day before the concert. She is attacked by a gunner who wounds her leg. They escape when the gunner pauses from shooting the killing shot. She does not report this to the police to avoid missing the concert.

Kogoro incorrectly deduces that the murderer is Genya as a year ago, the quarter quintet badly performed the 9th symphony of Ludwig van Beethoven whilst drunk. Kogoro assumes Domoto was a Beethoven fanatic, and seeing one of his songs defiled by drunks, murdered them. Evidence he points out was Genya's hair was cut the same way as Beethoven's. Genya reveals he got his hair from his mother, and his hair is natural.

At Domoto Concert Hall, the concert is being prepared. Sonoko says that a balcony is reserved with 10 seats, which is one for Shinichi. After rehearsal, Conan and Akiba look for Kazuki to tell him a key for the organ is a little flat. Near a lake, she and Conan are knocked out by the assailant with a wrench. They wake up downstream and hear an explosion coming from the Domoto Concert Hall. Since the concert hall is built to be soundproof and stable, the explosions outside could not be heard inside. The explosions are slowly destroying the pillars outside the hall to prevent entry or exit. Conan sees a phone on top of a building. He explains that phones work by hearing chords (a combination of one or more notes played at the same time) of sounds as numbers. He knocks the phone down with the soccer ball, and Akiba and Conan exert the right chords to dial 110, calling Miwako Sato and Wataru Takagi.

Conan enters the balcony of the assailant, revealing him to be Fuwa, while Akiba attempts to stop the explosions by singing Amazing Grace, which is in F major and thus avoids the note that causes explosions, while Sato and Takagi finds Müller, who getting tied up by Fuwa before the performance. Conan reveals the reason why Fuwa killed the first four people was to avenge his son, Akiba's fiancé, who died indirectly because of them, as well as his pride as a professional piano tuner being thrown away when Kazuki quit playing the piano. Without his son, wife, and pride of being a tuner for a professional pianist, his life was nothing, and he wanted to bring silence to the organ that haunted him.

Just then, the 24th irregular note was played, but the final explosion did not occur. Conan reveals that he had already removed the sensor from the organ before he came to Fuwa. Fuwa congratulates him and prepares to press the detonator, but it is shot out of his hand by Sato when Conan heard Ai playing Genta's recorder. Fuwa takes out a gun and prepares to commit suicide until Kazuki arrives and reveals to him that the reason he quit as a pianist was to keep Fuwa's pride. Because of Fuwa's old age, his hearing was starting to deteriorate, and so was his tuning, so to keep his pride, Kazuki quit being a pianist so he did not have to hurt his friend. Fuwa comes to realize this and surrenders peacefully. While outside the concert, Ran hears Amazing Grace played on a violin. She enters the wood where Conan tells her Shinichi played it to her to be forgiven like that day long ago.

In the post credits scene, Akiba reveals the song Amazing Grace is a song of forgiveness, a favorite of her late fiancé. She sings it on the anniversary of his death near the river, which is why she did not pursue revenge like Fuwa did for his son. Conan asks how Ran knew it was Shinichi playing the violin. Ran replies that he has a weird habit when he plays the violin. Conan is later seen in his house's library playing Amazing Grace to try to find his "strange habit".

== Cast ==
- Minami Takayama as Conan Edogawa
  - Kappei Yamaguchi as Shinichi Kudo
- Wakana Yamazaki as Ran Mouri
- Akira Kamiya as Kogoro Mouri
- Chafurin as Juzo Megure
- Atsuko Yuya as Miwako Sato
- Ikue Ohtani as Mitsuhiko Tsuburaya
- Megumi Hayashibara as Ai Haibara
- Naoko Matsui as Sonoko Suzuki
- Wataru Takagi as Genta Kojima and Wataru Takagi
- Yukiko Iwai as Ayumi Yoshida
- Kazuhiko Inoue as Ninzaburo Shiratori
- Nobuo Tanaka as Kazuki Domoto
- Kousuke Meguro as Genya Domoto
- Hōko Kuwashima as Reiko Akiba
- Yūko Mizutani as Rara Chigusa
- Eisuke Yoda as Takumi Fuwa
- Francis Pol as Hans Müller
- Mami Kingetsu as Shion Yamane

== Production ==
=== Music ===
The film's theme song is "Spread Your Wings" (翼を広げて, Tsubasa wo Hirogete) by Zard. It was released on April 9, 2008. Along with The Fourteenth Target and Strategy Above the Depths, this is the third Case Closed film theme song by Zard.

The official soundtrack was released on April 16, 2008.

== Home media ==
=== DVD ===
The DVD for Full Score of Fear was released on November 19, 2008. There were two types of DVD released; a special version and a regular version. The special version contains the film, and a bonus DVD that contains the trailer, news flash, and commercials of the film. The regular version only contains the film. Both version are in widescreen and 5.1 Dolby Digital Audio.

=== Blu-ray ===
The Blu-ray version of the film was released on April 22, 2011. The Blu-ray contains the same content of the DVD plus a mini-booklet explaining the film and the BD-live function.

== Reception ==
=== Box office ===
The film debuted at the number one position in the Japanese box office on its release date. As of May 5, 2008, the film has earned over 420.03 million yen. In the Japanese box office, it was twelfth on 2008's Top Domestic Movies earning 2.42 billion yen.
