= Naifu =

Japanese rock band

- Origin: Japan
- Genres: Alternative rock
- Years active: 2007–2009
- Labels: Tent House (2008); Giza Studio (2008-2009)
- Past members: Naoki Ko-jin (荒神直規); Atsuhi Yamaguchi (山口篤); Fuma Murakami (村上風麻); Siyon Morishita (森下志音); Takumi Matsuo (松尾拓実)
- Website: Naifu Official Website (WebArchive)

Naifu were a Japanese 4-piece rock band formed in 2007 under Giza Studio label. Naifu disbanded in 2009. Their management office was Ading.

== Members ==
- Naoki Ko-jin (荒神直規)- vocalist, guitarist (born 15 April)
- Atsuhi Yamaguchi (山口篤)- drummer, vocalist (born 7 July)
- Fuma Murakami (村上風麻) - bassist, vocalist (born 28 June)
- Siyon Morishita (森下志音) - guitarist, vocalist (born 11 January)
- Takumi Matsuo (松尾拓実) - keyboardist, vocalist

== Biography ==
Before the Naifu was formed, two out of formerly five members has been already active with music activities in indies label, such as Shion had own solo project SCHON and was member of rock band Mr.Orange, Naoki was guitar in rock band Elf.

On April 9, 2008, Siyon and Naoki were involved with music recording production of Zard's posthumous single Ai wa Kurayami no Naka de as choruses and arrangement. The single was used as an opening theme for popular Anime television series Detective Conan. On-air version started broadcast in January 2009.

Two weeks later, on April 23 band made indies debut with mini album "All Over Now EP" under indies label Tent House, the leading track Hikaru Ao ni Tobidase was commercially used as an ending theme for television music program "JAPAN COUNTDOWN" in PVTV segment on March.

In May 2008, Siyon and Naoki participated as a guest musicians on Zard's concert What a beautiful memory 2008. The DVD footage of concert was released in 2011.

In July 2008, they've made major debut with single Take The Wave under Giza Studio label. During the recording of single, the keyboardist Takumi has left the band. Original jacket cover shows 5 members together, however soon before CD release they're re-taken jacket with 4 of members together. The single was used as an opening theme for Anime television series Golgo 13.

In November 2008, they've released second single Mysterious. In media the song was used as an opening theme for anime television series Detective Conan. On air version of song started broadcast in October 2008. It's their most successful hit, on Oricon Weekly Charts it was ranked with position #36 and charted for seven weeks. With this song, they have made guest television appearance on Tokyo Broadcasting System Television music program Count Down TV.

In February 2009, their third single Koigokoro Kagayaki Nagara reprised role in Detective Conan as an ending theme, with lower sales and only two week charting.

In March 2009, they've released their first and only studio album One.

Their final single Sunset/Ari no Mama de was released in June 2009 and in media was used as an opening theme for music program Music Fighter.

In November 2009, the band has announced disband on 31 December 2009 through their Amebo blog.

After disband, in years 2010–2011, Atsushi was member of rock band WAR-ED, in years 2013-2014 was member of his solo unit Loe and since 2017 he's member of rock band Dps under new name Atsushi Kawamura. Siyon is nowadays active as a producer to Japanese singer Aya Kamiki. Fuma was member of rock band Hazze in years 2010-2013 and in years 2013-2018 was bassist of visual rock band Purple Stone. Naoki and Takumi presences are unknown since 2009.

== Discography ==
During their career they have released one studio and one mini album, and three singles.

=== Studio albums ===
- One (2009)

=== Mini album ===
- ALL OVER NOW EP (2008)

=== Singles ===
- Take The Wave (2008)
- Mysterious (2008)
- Koigokoro Kagayaki Nagara (2009)
- SUNSET / Ari no Mama de (2009)

== Television appearance ==
- Count Down TV - Mysterious

== Interview ==
From OKMUSIC:

- Okmusic UP's vol.47:Naifu
- Okmusic UP's vol.51:Naifu
- Okmusic UP's vol.53:Naifu
- Okmusic UP's vol.54:Naifu

== Magazine appearances ==
From Music Freak Magazine:

- Vol.163 2008/July
- Vol.166 2008/October
- Vol.167 2008/November
- Vol.168 2008/December
- Vol.169 2009/January
- Vol.170 2009/February
- Vol.171 2009/March
- Vol.173 2009/May
- Vol.174 2009/June
- Vol.175 2009/July
- Vol.176 2009/August
- Vol.177 2009/September
- Vol.178 2009/October
- Vol.179 2009/November
