= Nobuteru Maeda =

- Born: Nobuteru Maeda; April 23, 1965 (age 61); Atsugi, Kanagawa Prefecture, Japan
- Genres: Rock; pop; folk
- Occupations: Musician, singer-songwriter, producer, film score composer
- Instruments: Vocals; guitar
- Years active: 1985–present
- Label: Sony Music

Nobuteru Maeda (前田亘輝, Maeda Nobuteru; born April 23, 1965) is a Japanese male singer-songwriter from Atsugi, Kanagawa. He is signed onto Sony Music Japan. He is also a leader of rock band Tube. He released the hits "Sobani Iruyo" and "Try Boy, Try Girl".
