= Kitto Wasurenai =

Single by Zard

from the album Oh My Love
- Released: November 3, 1993
- Genre: Pop rock
- Label: B-Gram Records
- Songwriters: Izumi Sakai, Tetsurō Oda
- Producer: Daiko Nagato

Zard singles chronology
"Mō Sukoshi, Ato Sukoshi..." (1993)	"Kitto Wasurenai" (1993)	"Kono Ai ni Oyogi Tsukarete mo/Boy" (1994)

"Kitto Wasurenai (きっと忘れない)" is the 10th single by Zard and released 3 November 1993 under B-Gram Records label. It was released two months after previous single "Mō Sukoshi, Ato Sukoshi...". The single debuted at #1 rank first week. It charted for 15 weeks and sold over 872,000 copies.

== Track list ==
All songs are written by Izumi Sakai and arranged by Masao Akashi

1. Kitto Wasurenai (きっと忘れない)
  - composer: Tetsurō Oda
  - single and album version have different arrangements.
    - the song was used in Fuji TV drama Shiratori Reiko de Gozaimasu! as theme song
2. Tasogare ni My Lonely Heart (黄昏にMy Lonely Heart)
  - composer: Seiichiro Kuribayashi
3. Kitto Wasurenai (きっと忘れない) (original karaoke)
4. Tasogare ni My Lonely Heart (黄昏にMy Lonely Heart) (original karaoke)
