= Yah Yah Yah / Yume no Bannin =

Single by Chage and Aska

from the album Red Hill
- Released: March 3, 1993
- Label: Pony Canyon

Chage and Aska singles chronology
""no no darlin'"" (1992)	"Yah Yah Yah / Yume no Bannin" (1993)	"Sons and Daughters 〜それより僕が伝えたいのは" (1993)

Music video
- "YAH YAH YAH"

Music video
- "夢の番人"

"Yah Yah Yah / Yume no Bannin" (YAH YAH YAH/夢の番人) is a single by Japanese popular music duo Chage and Aska. It was released on March 3, 1993. It was number-one on the Oricon Weekly Singles Chart. It was the best-selling single in Japan in 1993, with 2.407 million copies sold and it is the 11th best-selling physical single in Japan, having sold a total of 2.419 million copies.

== Track listing ==
No.	Title	Length
1.	"YAH YAH YAH"
2.	"夢の番人"
3.	"君はなにも知らないまま"

== Weekly charts ==
Chart (1993)	Peak position
Japan Singles Chart (Oricon)	1
