= Love Me, I Love You =

Single by B'z

from the album Loose
- Released: July 7, 1995
- Genre: Hard rock
- Length: 3:20
- Label: BMG Japan
- Songwriter(s): Koshi Inaba, Tak Matsumoto
- Producer(s): Tak Matsumoto

B'z singles chronology
"Negai" (1995)	"Love Me, I Love You" (1995)	"Love Phantom" (1995)

"Love Me, I Love You" is the seventeenth single by B'z, released on July 7, 1995. This song is one of B'z many number-one singles in Oricon chart. It sold over 1,393,000 copies according to Oricon, giving their 10th million selling single. B'z became the first artist in Japan to have 10 million sellers consecutively. It was used as the drama Gehai Hiiragi Mata Saburō's theme song.

== Track listing ==
1. Love Me, I Love You
2. Tokyo (東京)

== Certifications ==
Region	Certification	Certified units/sales
Japan (RIAJ)	3× Platinum	1,200,000^{^}
^{^} Shipments figures based on certification alone.
