= Hold Me (Zard album) =

Studio album by Zard
- Released: September 2, 1992
- Genres: Pop rock; folk rock
- Length: 48:19
- Labels: Polydor, B-Gram
- Producer: Daiko Nagato

Zard chronology
Mou Sagasanai (1991)	Hold Me (1992)	Yureru Omoi (1993)

Singles from Hold Me
- 1. "Nemurenai Yoru wo Daite" Released: 5 August 1992

Hold Me is the third album by Japanese pop-rock group Zard and was released on September 2, 1992, under the Polydor label. In 1992, the album was released as a CD and cassette. In 1993, B-Gram Records re-released this album under CD format with code BGCH-1005.

== Chart performance ==
The album reached number two in Japan in its first week on the charts. It charted for 71 weeks and sold, in total, 1,065,000 copies.

== Track listing ==
All lyrics are written by Izumi Sakai.

Hold Me
No.	Title	Music	Arrangers	Length
1.	"Nemurenai Yoru wo Daite" (眠れない夜を抱いて)	Tetsurō Oda	Masao Akashi and Daisuke Ikeda	4:28
2.	"Dareka ga Matteru" (誰かが待ってる)	Seiichiro Kuribayashi	Akashi	3:55
3.	"Sayonara Ienakute" (サヨナラ言えなくて)	Kuribayashi	Ikeda	4:02
4.	"Ano Hohoemi wo Wasurenai de" (あの微笑みを忘れないで)	Daria Kawashima	Akashi	4:26
5.	"Sukina you ni Odoritai no" (好きなように踊りたいの)	Kazuya Izumi	Takeshi Hayama	4:23
6.	"Dangerous Tonight"	Kuribayashi	Akashi	4:13
7.	"Konna ni Aishite mo" (こんなに愛しても)	Kuribayashi	Akashi	5:00
8.	"Why Don't You Leave Me Alone"	Kawashima	Hayama	3:24
9.	"Ai wa Nemutteru" (愛は眠ってる)	Kawashima	Ikeda	3:39
10.	"Tooi Hi no Nostalgia" (遠い日のNostalgia)	Eisuke Mochizuki	Akashi	5:49
11.	"So Together"	Kawashima	Akashi	5:02

== In media ==
- "Ano Hohoemi wo Wasurenaide" is theme song for drama series Udemakuri Kangofu Monogatari
- "Dareka ga Matteru" is theme song for Nihon TV program Magical Zunou Power!
- "Nemurenai Yoru wo Daite" is ending theme f

or TV Asahi program Tonight

== Chart positions ==
Year	Chart	Position	Annual sales	Total sales	Yearly position
1992	Japanese Oricon Weekly Albums Chart	2	536,020	1,056,130	26
