= Loose (B'z album) =

Studio album by B'z
- Released: November 22, 1995
- Recorded: 1995
- Genre: Pop rock; blues rock
- Length: 49:57
- Label: Rooms Records
- Producer: Tak Matsumoto

B'z chronology
The 7th Blues (1994)	Loose (1995)	Survive (1997)

Singles from Loose
- 1. "Negai" Released: May 31, 1995; 2. "Love Me, I Love You" Released: July 7, 1995; 3. "Love Phantom" Released: October 11, 1995

Loose is the eighth studio album by the Japanese rock duo B'z, released on November 22, 1995. The album sold 1,336,150 copies in its first week, becoming the duo's highest debut for a duo album. In total over 3,003,210 copies were sold, making it the duo's highest selling studio album.

One of the album's standout tracks is a blues-flavored remake of "Bad Communication," as well as a more energetic version of the hit "Negai".

Loose was B'z first album released under the newly independent Rooms Records label, following B Zone's purchase of BMG Japan's shares in the label.

== Track listing ==
1. Spirit Loose - 1:04
2. Za Ruuzu (The Loose) (ザ・ルーズ) - 3:32
3. Negai("BUZZ!!" STYLE) (ねがい("BUZZ!!" STYLE)) - 5:01
4. Yumemigaoka (夢見が丘) - 4:40
5. Bad Communication (000–18) - 4:57
6. Kienai Niji (消えない虹) - 3:37
7. Love Me, I Love You (with G Bass) - 3:20
8. Love Phantom - 4:40
9. Teki ga Inakerya (敵がいなけりゃ) - 3:14
10. Suna no Hanabira (砂の花びら) - 3:41
11. Kirei na Ai jya Nakutemo (キレイな愛じゃなくても) - 4:04
12. Big - 2:53
13. Drive to My World - 4:09

== Certifications ==
Region	Certification	Certified units/sales
Japan (RIAJ)	3× Million	3,000,000^{^}
^{^} Shipments figures based on certification alone.
