= Tube (band) =

Japanese pop band

- Origin: Japan
- Genres: Power pop; surf rock; blues rock
- Years active: 1985-present
- Label: Sony Music Associated Records
- Members: Nobuteru Maeda; Michiya Haruhata; Hideyuki Kakuno; Ryoji Matsumoto
- Website: www.tube.gr.jp

YouTube information
- Channel: TUBE Official YouTube Channel
- Years active: 2014–present
- Subscribers: 83 thousand
- Views: 40 million
- Last updated: January 15, 2024

Tube (チューブ, chūbu) is a Japanese pop rock band formed in 1985. The members of the group are Nobuteru Maeda (前田亘輝), Michiya Haruhata (春畑道哉) Hideyuki Kakuno (角野秀行) and Ryoji Matsumoto (松本玲二). Tube members Maeda and Haruhata have composed for other artists under the Pipeline Project alias. Since the group released most of its songs in April to July, the catchphrase originated "Summer comes with Tube".

Two years after the band debut in 1987, Haruhata and Maeda launched their solo careers. In 1994, Kakuno formed his own band Riding which lasted until 1999.

== Members ==
- Nobuteru Maeda – vocals, lyrics, composition, leader
- Michiya Haruhata – guitar, keyboard, composition, backing-vocals
- Hideyuki Kakuno – bass guitar, backing-vocals
- Ryoji Matsumoto – drums, percussion, backing-vocals

== Discography ==
=== Albums ===
==== Studio albums ====
Title	Album details	Peak chart positions
Title	Album details	JPN Oricon
Heart of Summer	Released: 1 July 1985; Label: CBS Sony; Formats: CD, LP, cassette, digital download, streaming	29
Off Shore Dreamin'	Released: 1 December 1985; Label: CBS Sony; Formats: CD, LP, cassette, digital download, streaming	62
The Season in the Sun	Released: 1 June 1986; Label: CBS Sony; Formats: CD, LP, cassette, digital download, streaming	3
Boys on the Beach	Released: 1 December 1986; Label: CBS Sony; Formats: CD, LP, cassette, digital download, streaming	6
Summer Dream	Released: 21 May 1987; Label: CBS Sony; Formats: CD, LP, cassette, digital download, streaming	2
Twilight Swim	Released: 21 November 1987; Label: CBS Sony; Formats: CD, LP, cassette, digital download, streaming	7
Beach Time	Released: 21 May 1988; Label: CBS Sony; Formats: CD, LP, cassette, digital download, streaming	3
Remember Me	Released: 21 December 1988; Label: CBS Sony; Formats: CD, LP, cassette, digital download, streaming	10
Summer City	Released: 21 June 1989; Label: CBS Sony; Formats: CD, cassette, digital download, streaming	6
Natsu	Released: 15 June 1990; Label: CBS Sony; Formats: CD, Cassette tape, digital download, streaming	2
Shonan (湘南)	Released: 25 May 1991; Label: Sony Music; Formats: CD, cassette, digital download, streaming	3
Noryo (納涼)	Released: 15 April 1992; Label: Sony Music; Formats: CD, cassette, digital download, streaming	1
Roman no Natsu (浪漫の夏)	Released: 18 June 1993; Label: Sony Music; Formats: CD, cassette, digital download, streaming	1
Owaranai Natsu ni (終わらない夏に)	Released: 15 June 1994; Label: Sony Music; Formats: CD, digital download, streaming	1
Yuzurenai Natsu (ゆずれない夏)	Released: 17 June 1995; Label: Sony Music; Formats: CD, digital download, streaming	2
Only Good Summer	Released: 10 June 1996; Label: Sony Music; Formats: CD, digital download, streaming	1
Bravo!	Released: 1 July 1997; Label: Sony Music; Formats: CD, digital download, streaming	2
Heat Waver	Released: 1 July 1998; Label: Sony Music; Formats: CD, digital download, streaming	2
Blue Reef	Released: 9 June 1999; Label: Sony Music; Formats: CD, digital download, streaming	3
Lani Kai	Released: 20 July 2000; Label: Sony Music; Formats: CD, digital download, streaming	2
Soul Surfin' Crew	Released: 11 July 2001; Label: Sony Music; Formats: CD, digital download, streaming	4
Good Day Sunshine	Released: 31 July 2002; Label: Sony Music; Formats: CD, digital download, streaming	2
Oasis	Released: 16 July 2003; Label: Sony Music; Formats: CD, digital download, streaming	3
Natsu Geshiki (夏景色)	Released: 22 July 2004; Label: Sony Music; Formats: CD, digital download, streaming	3
Tube	Released: 20 July 2005; Label: Sony Music; Formats: CD, digital download, streaming	4
BBQ	Released: 12 July 2006; Label: Sony Music; Formats: CD, digital download, streaming	4
Winter Letter	Released: 12 December 2007; Label: Sony Music; Formats: CD, digital download, streaming	7
Paradiso	Released: 16 July 2008; Label: Sony Music; Formats: CD, digital download, streaming	3
Blue Splash	Released: 8 July 2009; Label: Sony Music; Formats: CD, digital download, streaming	7
Surprise!	Released: 7 July 2010; Label: Sony Music; Formats: CD, digital download, streaming	4
Re-Creation	Released: 20 July 2011; Label: Sony Music; Formats: CD, digital download, streaming	3
Summer Addiction	Released: 27 June 2012; Label: Sony Music; Formats: CD, digital download, streaming	3
Your Tube + My Tube	Released: 17 June 2015; Label: Sony Music; Formats: CD, digital download, streaming	4
Natsu no Nihon kara Konnichiwa (日本の夏からこんにちは)	Released: 8 July 2020; Label: Sony Music; Formats: CD, digital download, streaming	3

==== Remix albums ====
Title	Album details	Peak chart positions
Title	Album details	JPN Oricon
Mix Tube: Remixed by Piston Nishizawa	Released: 7 July 2010; Label: Sony Music; Formats: CD	13
35nen de 35kyoku Natsu to Koi: Natsu no Kazu take Koistakedo (35年で35曲 “夏と恋” 〜夏の数だけ恋したけど〜)	Released: 24 July 2020; Label: Sony Music; Formats: CD	7
35nen de 35kyoku Ase to Namida: Namida wa Kokoro no Ase Dakara (35年で35曲 “汗と涙” 〜涙は心の汗だから〜)	Released: 24 July 2020; Label: Sony Music; Formats: CD	8
35nen de 35kyoku Ai to Yuu: Boku no Melody Kimi no Tame ni (35年で35曲 “愛と友” 〜僕のMelody 君のために〜)	Released: 9 December 2020; Label: Sony Music; Formats: CD	15

==== Compilation albums ====
Title	Album details	Peak chart positions
Title	Album details	JPN Oricon
Tubest	Released: 21 December 1989; Label: CBS Sony; Formats: CD, Cassette tape, digital download, streaming	5
Melodies & Memories	Released: 16 November 1994; Label: Sony Music; Formats: CD, digital download, streaming	1
Tubest II	Released: 1 April 1996; Label: Sony Music; Formats: CD, digital download, streaming	3
TubestIII	Released: 13 May 2000; Label: Sony Music; Formats: CD, digital download, streaming	1
Melodies & Memories II	Released: 21 November 2001; Label: Sony Music; Formats: CD, digital download, streaming	5
Best of Tubest: All Time Best	Released: 15 July 2015; Label: Sony Music; Formats: CD, digital download, streaming	2
All Singles Tubest: Blue	Released: 11 June 2025; Label: Sony Music; Formats: CD, digital download, streaming	5
All Singles Tubest: White	Released: 11 June 2025; Label: Sony Music; Formats: CD, digital download, streaming	6

=== EPs ===
Title	EP details	Peak chart positions
Title	EP details	JPN Oricon
Smile	Released: 15 April 1992; Label: Sony Music; Formats: CD, cassette, digital download, streaming	2
Say Hello	Released: 21 April 1993; Label: Sony Music; Formats: CD, cassette, digital download, streaming	4
Sunny Day	Released: 7 June 2017; Label: Sony Music; Formats: CD, digital download, streaming	3

=== Singles ===
Year	Album	Chart positions (JP)	Label
1985	"Bestseller Summer" (ベストセラー・サマー)	13	CBS Sony
1985	"Sentimental ni Kubittake" (センチメンタルに首ったけ)	64	CBS Sony
1986	"Season in the Sun" (シーズン・イン・ザ・サン)	6	CBS Sony
1986	"Because I Love You"	13	CBS Sony
1987	"Summer Dream"	3	CBS Sony
1987	"Dance with You"	3	CBS Sony
1988	"Beach Time"	4	CBS Sony
1988	"Remember Me"	12	CBS Sony
1989	"Summer City"	12	CBS Sony
1989	"Stories"	21	CBS Sony
1990	"Ah Natsuyasumi" (あー夏休み)	10	CBS Sony
1991	"Shonan My Love" (湘南My Love)	7	Sony Music
1991	"Sayonara Yesterday" (さよならイエスタデイ)	3	Sony Music
1992	"Natsu dane" (夏だね)	2	Sony Music
1992	"Glass no Memories" (ガラスのメモリーズ)	5	Sony Music
1993	"Natsu wo Machikirenakute" (夏を待ちきれなくて)	1	Sony Music
1993	"Datte Natsu janai" (だって夏じゃない)	1	Sony Music
1994	"Natsu wo Dakishimete" (夏を抱きしめて)	1	Sony Music
1994	"Koi shite Mucho" (恋してムーチョ)	6	Sony Music
1994	"Melodies & Memories"	3	Sony Music
1995	"Yuzurenai Natsu" (ゆずれない夏)	2	Sony Music
1995	"Ano Natsu wo Sagashite" (あの夏を探して)\	2	Sony Music
1996	"Only You Kimi to Natsu no Hi wo" (Only You 君と夏の日を)	9	Sony Music
1997	"Jonetsu" (情熱)	6	Sony Music
1997	"Purity" (ピュアティ)	33	Sony Music
1998	"Junjo" (-純情-)	13	Sony Music
1998	"Hanabi" (-花火-)	9	Sony Music
1998	"Kitto Dokokade" (きっと どこかで)	2	Sony Music
1999	"Himawari" (ひまわり)	7	Sony Music
1999	"Yheei!"	18	Sony Music
1999	"In My Dream"	16	Sony Music
2000	"Truth of Time"	10	Sony Music
2000	"Niji ni Naritai" (虹になりたい)	2	Sony Music
2001	"Tsuki to Taiyō" (月と太陽)	4	Sony Music
2001	"Hatsukoi" (初恋)	9	Sony Music
2001	"Moeru Kemuru Mon Amour" (燃える煙るモナムール)	13	Sony Music
2002	"I'm in Love You, Good Day Sunshine"	8	Sony Music Associated
2002	"Kaze ni Yureru Tomorrow" (風に揺れるTomorrow)	8	Sony Music Associated
2003	"Aoi Melody" (青いメロディー)	6	Sony Music Associated
2003	"Let's Go to the Sea (Oasis)"	5	Sony Music Associated
2003	"Gekko" (月光)	9	Sony Music Associated
2004	"Propose" (プロポーズ)	8	Sony Music Associated
2004	"Natsumatsuri/Namida wo Nijini" (夏祭り/涙を虹に)	5	Sony Music Associated
2004	"Miracle Game"	10	Sony Music Associated
2005	"Sky High"	12	Sony Music Associated
2005	"Ding!Dong!Dang!"	13	Sony Music Associated
2006	"Minna no Umi" (みんなのうみ)	20	Sony Music Associated
2008	"Hotaru" (蛍)	5	Sony Music Associated
2008	"Paradiso (Ai no Meikyū)" (Paradiso 〜愛の迷宮〜)	13	Sony Music Associated
2009	"Summer Greeting"	8	Sony Music Associated
2010	"Shakunetsu Love" (灼熱らぶ)	8	Sony Music Associated
2010	"Sora to Umi ga Aruyouni" (空と海があるように)	8	Sony Music Associated
2011	"A Day in the Summer (Omoudehaegaonomama)" (A Day In The Summer ～思い出は笑顔のまま～)	8	Sony Music Associated
2011	"Touch Happy"	14	Sony Music Associated
2012	"Itsumo, Itsumademo" (いつも、いつまでも)	9	Sony Music Associated
2015	"Imasara Surfside" (いまさらサーフサイド)	6	Sony Music Associated
2015	"Summer Time"	5	Sony Music Associated
2015	"Tonight"	8	Sony Music Associated
2015	"Toudai" (灯台)	9	Sony Music Associated
2016	"Ride on Summer"	11	Sony Music Associated
2018	"Natsu ga Kuru!" (夏が来る!)	10	Sony Music Associated
2021	"Blue Wings"	6	Sony Music Associated
2022	"Kaze Tachinu" (夏立ちぬ)	14	Sony Music Associated

==== Digital single ====
Year	Single	Reference
2023	"WeTube: Natsu Yarou no Natsu" (WeTube〜夏やろうの夏〜)	

==== Collaboration single ====
Year	Album	Chart positions (JP)	Label
2024	"Sayonara no Kawaii ni" (サヨナラのかわりに): with Gackt	9	Sony Music Associated
2024	"Mamatsu no Juumon" (真夏のじゅもん): with Da Pump	-	Sony Music Associated

== Videography ==
=== Video albums ===
No.	Release	Title	Format
1st	21 June 1986	The Island in the Sun	VHS, LD
2nd	21 June 1987	Summer Dream	VHS, LD
3rd	28 November 1987	Best Collection on the Beach	VHS, LD
4th	21 November 1988	Nettaiya Live	VHS, LD, DVD
5th	2 August 1989	5th Summer	VHS
6th	21 September 1989	Tube Live Around Spsecial Sun=Sea=Go	VHS, DVD
7th	21 July 1990	Natsu	VHS
8th	20 December 1990	Tube Live Around Special	VHS, DVD
9th	25 July 1991	Shochūmima	VHS
10th	22 July 1992	Natsu dane//Sayonara Yesterday	VHS
11th	21 November 1992	Tube Live Around Special Stadium Tour '92	VHS, DVD
12th	21 July 1993	Manatsu Made 7500 Miles: Video Clips '93 in Miami	VHS, DVD
13th	21 July 1994	世界の果てまで夏だった '94 in Mexico	VHS, DVD
14th	12 December 1994	Tube Live Around Special '94 F・S・F The Concert	VHS, DVD
14th	12 December 1994	Tube Live Around Special '94 F・S・F The Documentary	VHS
15th	21 July 1995	Sekai no Hate made Natsu Datta '95	VHS, DVD
16th	1 July 1996	Sekai no Hate made Natsu Datta '96 in California	VHS, DVD
17th	12 December 1996	Tube Live Around Special '96 Only Good Summer	VHS, DVD
18th	21 November 1998	Tube Live Around Special '98 Heat Waver	DVD
19th	20 September 2000	TTube Live Around Special June.1.2000 in Aloha Stadium	VHS, DVD
20th	5 December 2001	Tube Live Around Special 2001 Soul Surfin' Crew Live & Documentary	VHS, DVD
21st	23 March 2004	Shunkashūtō 2003–04: Itsumo Koi ni wa Iro ga aru	DVD
22nd	8 December 2004	Tube Live Around Special 2004 Ah Natsu Matsuri	DVD
23rd	20 July 2005	Tube Clips + Fan's Choice	DVD
24th	5 April 2006	20th Summer	DVD
25th	12 December 2007	Tube Live Around Special 2007	DVD
26th	30 April 2008	Tube Live Around 2007 Fuyu de Gomenne: Winter Letter	DVD
27th	24 December 2008	Tube Live Around Special 2008 Paradiso	DVD
28th	11 November 2009	Tube Live Around 2009: We're Buddy – Live & Documentary	DVD
29th	13 April 2011	Tube 25th Summer (DVD box)	DVD
29th	13 April 2011	Tube 25th Summer (Blu-ray box)	BD
29th	13 April 2011	Tube 3D Live (Surprise!): Live Around Special 2010 in Yokohama Stadium	BD
30th	19 December 2012	Tube Live Around Special 2012: Summer Addiction	DVD, BD
31st	27 November 2013	Tube Live Around Special 2013 Handmade Summer	DVD, BD
32nd	1 June 2016	Tub 30th Summer Year!!!	DVD, BD
33rd	15 November 2017	Tube 2017 Yokohama Stadium sunny day: Live&Back Stage	DVD, BD
34th	26 December 2018	Tube Live Around Special 2018 Natsu ga Kita: Yokohama Stadium 30 Times	DVD, BD
35th	2 October 2019	H→R 2017 Winter "Unknown 4" & 2019 Summer "SHR"	DVD, BD
36th	23 December 2020	Tube Live Around Special 2019~2020 "At Stadium & at Home"	DVD, BD
37th	22 December 2021	Tube Live Around 2021 Blue Wings	DVD, BD
38th	21 December 2022	Tube Live Around Special 2022 Reunion: Live & Documentary	DVD, BD
39th	27 December 2023	Tube Live Around Special 2023 Tube Jamboree	DVD, BD
