= Makenaide =

Single by Zard

from the album Yureru Omoi
- Released: January 27, 1993
- Genre: Pop rock, J-pop
- Label: B-Gram Records
- Songwriters: Izumi Sakai, Tetsurō Oda
- Producer: Daiko Nagato

Zard singles chronology
"In My Arms Tonight" (1993)	"Makenaide" (1993)	"Kimi ga Inai" (1993)

Makenaide (負けないで, lit. "Please don't lose") is the 6th single by Zard released on 27 January 1993 under B-Gram Records label.

== Background ==
According to the song's composer Tetsurō Oda, Izumi Sakai was singing "strangely," but it proved to be good. The single reached #1 rank, the first time a Zard single had done so. It charted for 18 weeks and it sold over 1.64 million copies and became the highest-selling song for Zard. When she died, it was elected as the best song by Zard on the Oricon polls.

It was a song that greatly appealed to the Japanese public. Released at a time that is now seen as the beginning of Japan's post economic bubble era when the Nikkei 225 Index had shrunk in value by a third in only three years, "Makenaide" (Don't Give Up) became known as the theme song of the country's "Lost Decade." While Sakai commented on the television show Music Station that it would encourage men taking examinations, many people said this song helped them cope with difficult issues such as school bullying. Zard fans’ favorite phrase, "Run through until the End," was originally "Do Not Give Up until the End."

"Makenaide" has been used as a theme song for the Nippon Television program 24-hour TV, an annual charity program hosted live by celebrities for a day. Sakai said that she was honored and looked forward to watching 24-hour TV. The song was also adopted by high school baseball in Japan.

== Track list ==
All songs are written by Izumi Sakai

1. Makenaide (負けないで)
  - composer: Tetsurō Oda/arrangement: Takeshi Hayama
2. Stray Love
  - composer: Daria Kawashima/arrangement: Masao Akashi
3. Makenaide (負けないで) (original karaoke)
4. Stray Love (original karaoke)

== Cover ==
The song was covered by Emiri Katō as the ending song to episode 12 of the anime adaptation of Lucky Star, in a tribute to the late Izumi Sakai. Junior from the same music company, Mai Kuraki performed the cover on 1 February 2019 on music television program Music Station. The duet received positive feedbacks from both the Mai Kuraki and Zard fans, the recording will be included in limited edition of studio album Let's Goal!: Barairo no Jinsei. The cover has been produced and arranged by Hiroshi Asai from instrumental fusion band Sensation.
