= Yureru Omoi (song) =

Single by Zard

from the album Yureru Omoi
- Released: May 19, 1993
- Genre: Pop rock
- Label: B-Gram Records
- Songwriters: Tetsurō Oda, Izumi Sakai
- Producer: Daiko Nagato

Zard singles chronology
"Kimi ga Inai" (1993)	"Yureru Omoi" (1993)	"Mō Sukoshi, Ato Sukoshi..." (1993)

"Yureru Omoi" is the 8th single by Zard and released 19 May 1993 under B-Gram Records label. The single debuted at #1 rank two weeks. It charted for 20 weeks and sold over 1,396,000 copies and became second highest-selling single in her career. When she died, it was elected as her second best song on the Oricon polls.

== Track list ==
All songs are written by Izumi Sakai.

1. Yureru Omoi (揺れる想い)
  - composer: Tetsurō Oda/arrangement: Masao Akashi
2. Just for you
  - composer: Seiichiro Kuribayashi/arrangement: Akashi and Daisuke Ikeda
3. Yureru Omoi (揺れる想い) (original karaoke)
4. Just for you (original karaoke)
