= Gedō (band) =

Japanese rock band

- Origin: Tokyo, Japan
- Genres: Rock
- Years active: 1973–1976; 1979–1982; 1991; 2002–2003; 2010–present
- Labels: Nippon Columbia; Polydor; King; Sony Music Entertainment Japan; Universal IMS; Trio; Merudakku; Showboat; Meldac
- Members: Hideto Kanou; Soul Toul; Matsumoto Shinji
- Past members: Masayuki Aoki; Nakano Ryoichi

Gedō (外道), also romanized simply as Gedo or Gedou, is a Japanese rock band. They were formed in 1973. The band split up for the first time in 1976, then reformed and split again several times. Their first self-titled album is highly acclaimed in their home country, and was featured on Rolling Stone's 100 greatest Japanese albums (N°24) and Julian Cope's Japrocksampler, among other lists.

== Members ==
- Hideto Kanou: vocals, guitar. He is the central member of Gedō.
- Aoki Masayuki: vocals, bass guitar. Founding member, he left in 1981.
- Nakano Ryoichi: vocals, drums. Founding member, he left the band but returned for the 2002-2003 reformation.
- Matsumoto Shinji: vocals, bass guitar. He joined the band in 2002.
- Soul Toul: vocals, drums. He joined the band in 1991, and re-joined in 2010.

== Discography ==
- Gedō (外道) (20 September 1974)
- Gedō Live in Sound of Hawaii Studio (外道ライブ・イン・サウンド・オブ・ハワイ・スタジオ) (1 April 1975)
- JUST GEDO (June 1975)
- Shide LIVE (拾得LIVE) (November 1975)
- POWER CUT (April 1981)
- Mooning (1982)
- Gedō LIVE 〜Mihappyou Kaisan Concert 1976.10.16 (外道LIVE 〜未発表・解散コンサート1976.10.16) (April 1991)
- One, Two (21 July 1991)
- DIE FOR YOU (1993)
- Kaze Densetsu Bukkomi no Taku ～Yasei no Tenshitachi～ (疾風列伝 特攻の拓～野生の天使たち～) (1995)
- Gedō SINGLES (1973-1975) (外道SINGLES(1973-1975)) (1998)
- 水金地火木土天回明 〜外道・秘蔵音源集 その壱 (30 November 2002)
- 水金地火木土天回明 〜外道・秘蔵音源集 その弐 (30 November 2002)
- Best Gedō (ベスト外道) (24 July 2003)
- Kyou Netsu no Machida Police '74 (狂熱の町田ポリス'74) (24 July 2003)
- Kyoto Shide -Kanzenban- (京都拾得-完全版-) (24 July 2003)
- 1975 -Yahon Kyo no Aloha- (1975 -野音狂のアロハ- (24 July 2003)
- NφW (26 September 2003)
- 1976 Sayonara Nippon (1976 さよならニッポン) (27 November 2003)
- Saigo no Mandala Yaneura Densetsu '76 (最期の曼荼羅屋根裏伝説 '76) (27 November 2003)
- Jitsuroku Hitman Hokkai No Tora -Boukyou- ORIGINAL SOUNDTRACK (実録ヒットマン 北海の虎 -望郷- ORIGINAL SOUNDTRACK) (27 November 2003)
- Itsumo no Tokorode Blues Wo〜LIVE IN CROCODILE (いつものところでブルースを〜LIVE IN CROCODILE) (23 May 2015)
- Tamashii no Sakebi (魂の叫び) (6 November 2013)
