= Michiya Haruhata =

Michiya Haruhata 春畑道哉
- Also known as: UNI
- Born: November 5, 1966 (age 59)
- Genres: Japanese pop, Pop rock, Rock
- Occupations: Guitarist, composer, arranger, record producer
- Years active: 1985–present
- Labels: Sony Music Entertainment Japan
- Website: https://www.sonymusic.co.jp/artist/MichiyaHaruhata/

Michiya Haruhata (春畑道哉, Haruhata Michiya; born November 5, 1966) is a Japanese musical composer, guitarist and music producer under Sony Music Entertainment Japan. He is a member of the pop rock band Tube.

== Biography ==
As a child he was interested in learning piano, however later he was influenced by his father who owned an acoustic guitar. In middle school, he formed the school band Rainbow and was the lead guitarist. In high school he formed amateurs band; Backing M with each of the members coming from different school, Michiya’s role being as the guitarist. In 1984, Michiya took part in the music festival Silc Road held by music agency Being Inc, where he won an award for best guitarist. On the same festival was Nobuteru Maeda, who won the award for best vocalist. With Nobutoru and two more members, Ryoji Matsumoto and Hideyuki Kakuno, they had one year of activity in the amateur band "Pipeline".

All the members were gathered together and in 1985 made their major debut with the band Tube under Sony Music Entertainment Japan. As of 2023 Michiya is still an active member. Two years later in 1987, he started his solo career with the release of the instrumental album Drivin'.

In 1992, he started expanding his musical activities by composing and arranging for artists such as Twinzer, Mi-Ke and Zard. Between years 1996 and 1999, he would temporarily resume his solo career and started his producing records for the Japanese singer Kanae. During the same period, he and Nobutoru formed the production project; Pipeline Project, the name being taken from their amateur period time, where they would contribute compositions, lyrics and arrangements as a duo to various Japanese artists.

Michiya was given his own Signature Model Stratocaster from Fender in 2002.

In 2005, he was part of the guitarist session along with Takashi Masuzaki from the fusion band Dimension, and Yoshinobu Ohga from OOM and released together compilation album "Theatre Of Strings" produced and composed by japanese guitarist Tak Matsumoto from the rock band B'z.

Since 2012, the music agency Being has launched once-in-year event called Being Legend: Guitar summit, in which he performs on live venues with juniors such as Akihide from Breakerz, Hiroshi Shibazaki from Wands, Shinji Tagawa from Deen, Takashi Gomi from T-BOLAN and Takashi Masuzaki from Dimension.

His song "Jaguar '08" was named the 31st best guitar instrumental by Young Guitar Magazine in 2019.

In 2020, his instrumental album Continue received the award for Best Instrumental Album of the Year at the 34th Japan Gold Disc Award.

== Signature guitars ==
He is not only the first Japanese but the first Asian guitarist to be added to the Fender signature artist club. He is also one of few people to receive multiple Fender signature guitars, having three unique signature designs in the line:

The Michiya Haruhata Stratocaster (released in 2002)

The Michiya Haruhata BWL Stratocaster (released in 2005),

And the Michiya Haruhata III Stratocaster (released in 2022).

== Usage in media ==
His song "J'S Theme" became the official theme song of the J.League, Japan's professional football (soccer) league. In 1993 he performed for 60,000 spectators live at the J-league opening ceremony at the national stadium.

His single "Kingdom of the Heavens" was made to be the theme song of the New Japan Pro-Wrestling tournament.

== Discography ==
As of 2023, he has released 3 singles, 11 solo albums, 2 compilation albums, 1 EP and 3 digital releases.

=== Studio albums ===
#	Release date	Title	Peak position	Code
1st	1987	Drivin'	-	28DH623
2nd	1987	Smile on Me	-	32DH5217
3rd	1990	Guitar Land	23	CSCL1108
4th	1991	Dream Box	27	CSCL1658
5th	1992	Moon	27	CSCL1658
6th	1993	Real Time	35	SRCL2565
7th	1995	Color of Life	-	SRCL2943
8th	2000	Red Bird	42	SRCL4924
9th	2016	Play the Life	9	AICL3187
10th	2019	Continue	13	AICL3662
10th	2022	Spring Has Come	13	AICL4233

=== Compilation albums ===
#	Release date	Title	Peak position	Code
1st	2008	Best Works 1987–2008: Route 66	42	AICL1987/8
2nd	2012	Find My Place	27	AICL2492

=== EP ===
#	Release date	Title	Code
1st	1993	J's Theme	SRCL2748

=== Singles ===
#	Release date	Title	Peak position	Code
1st	1992	J's Theme	36	SRDL3563
2nd	1992	Best Day of Your Life	87	SRDL4069
3rd	2013	Jaguar'13	30	AICL2544

=== Digital release ===
	Release date	Title	Chart
1st	2018	Re-birth	1 (Recochoku)Rock Chart Recochoku）
2nd	2019	Kingdom of the Heavens	-
