= Case Closed season 13 =

Season of television series

Case Closed
- Season 13
- The cover of the first DVD compilation for season thirteen of Detective Conan released by Shogakukan
- No. of episodes: 36

Release
- Original network: NNS (ytv)
- Original release: March 8, 2004 – February 21, 2005

Season chronology
- ← Previous; Season 12 Next → Season 14

The thirteenth season of the Case Closed anime was directed by Masato Satō and produced by TMS Entertainment and Yomiuri Telecasting Corporation. The series is based on Gosho Aoyama's Case Closed manga series. In Japan, the series is titled Detective Conan (名探偵コナン, Meitantei Conan) but was changed due to legal issues with the title Detective Conan. The episodes' plot follows Conan Edogawa's daily adventures.

The episodes use four pieces of theme music: two opening themes and two ending themes. The first opening theme is "Kimi to Yakusoku Shita Yasashii Ano Basho made" (君と約束した優しいあの場所まで, lit. "The Paradise I Promised You") by U-ka Saegusa in dB until episode 355 The second opening theme is for the rest of the season "Start" by Rina Aiuchi for the rest of the season. The first ending theme is "Nemuru Kimi no Yokogao ni Hohoemi wo" (眠る君の横顔に微笑みを, lit. "The Smile on your Sleeping Face") by U-ka Saegusa in dB until episode 375. The second ending theme is "Wasurezaki" (忘れ咲き, lit. "Forget to Bloom") by Garnet Crow for the rest of the season.

The season initially ran from March 8, 2004, through February 21, 2005, on Nippon Television Network System in Japan. Episodes 354 to 389 were later collected into ten DVD compilations by Shogakukan. They were released between December 23, 2005, and April 28, 2006, in Japan.

== Episode list ==
No.	No. in season	Title	Directed by	Written by	Original air date
354	1	"A Small Client (Part 1)"; Transliteration: "Chiisana Iraisha (Zenpen)" (Japanese: 小さな依頼者（前編）)	Hideaki Oniwa	N/A	March 8, 2004
A seven-year-old movie star by the name of Kazuki Kinukawa comes to the Mori office to try to find his mother who abandoned him at a church. His reasons are to tell his mother he will not give her any money now that he is famous. Conan is able to deduce Kazuki's mother is a hotel employee in Atami due to the old dirty postcards she sent him. Kazuki reveals that he remembered that his mother had a beauty mark near her breast. A freelance writer named Yushiro Kamoshita checks into the hotel as he plans to find Kazuki's mother and interview her to confirm whether Kazuki's father was truly a murderer. Later that day, Kamoshita is strangled to death but managed to take a picture on his cellphone during the attack. The picture reveals that a woman with a beauty mark near her breast is the murderer. The police gather three female employees with no alibi during the time of the murder; Each of them has a beauty mark but none of them are near the breast.
355	2	"A Small Client (Part 2)"; Transliteration: "Chiisana Iraisha (Kōhen)" (Japanese: 小さな依頼者（後編）)	Hideaki Oniwa	N/A	March 15, 2004
The forensic team reveals that Kamoshita was knocked on the head with a shower nozzle knocking him unconscious and was later strangled. While the police are watching a videotape found in Kamoshita's room, Conan notices that the movie ended two minutes earlier than the time indicated on the box and realizes how the murder is done. Conan tranquilizes Kogoro and uses his voice changing bowtie to impersonate him. Conan reveals that the beauty mark on the murderer was actually a blood stain and that the culprit is revealed to be Toshio Bessho as evidenced by the small blood stain near her collar. Toshio confesses to the murder and explains that she decided to play a joke on Kazuki's production company by threatening to reveal Kazuki's father is a murderer unless they pay her ¥20 million. However, they actually paid her which sparked Kamoshita's investigation. Kamshita upon finding the truth, blackmails Toshio for money which motivated her for murder. The following day, Kazuki gives Tomoka Saegusa a package of post cards and tells her she has to continue to send her monthly post cards or he will visit her again. As Kazuki leaves, Tomoka breaks down in guilt for abandoning her son those many years ago.
356	3	"Kaitou Kid's Miraculous Midair Walk^{1 hr.}" Transliteration: "Kaitō Kiddo no Kyoui Kuuchuu Hokō" (Japanese: 怪盗キッドの驚異空中歩行)	Hideaki Oniwa	N/A	April 12, 2004
Sonoko's uncle wants to capture Kaito Kid to improve his fame. Kaito Kid arrives on the scene and seemingly walks on air to investigate the treasure he will steal. Conan investigates and finds out the trick Kaito Kid used. The second time Kaito Kid tries to steal the jewel but it was revealed to be a distraction. Kaito Kid steals the jewel from indoors and is making his escape on a motorcycle when Conan is found to be on the passenger seat. Kaito Kid manages to lose Conan and escape once again.
357	4	"Sweetheart Is an Illusion of Spring"; Transliteration: "Koibito wa Haru no Maboroshi" (Japanese: 恋人は春のまぼろし)	Katsuyoshi Yatabe	Nobuo Ogizawa	April 26, 2004
Ran and Conan run into Sachiko, an acquaintance of Ran's, while shopping. She says she is buying steak for dinner with her lover who's visiting. Later Ran and Conan find that Sachiko is murdered. Everyone suspects Sachiko's lover, but only Sachiko's steak had been eaten and there were no prints besides Sachiko's found on any of the items on the table. It's later revealed that Sachiko's lover died in a tragic climbing accident, and every month on the 25th for the last year and a half she has honored his memory. The murderer is confronted by Takagi, Ran and Conan; he eventually admits to killing Sachiko for rejecting him.
358	5	"Metropolitan Police Detective Love Story 5 (Part 1)"; Transliteration: "Honchō no Keiji Koimonogatari 5 (Zenpen)" (Japanese: 本庁の刑事恋物語5（前編）)	Nana Harada	N/A	May 3, 2004
Takagi and Sato are on a date at the amusement park. Meanwhile, Shiratori along with several officers are at the amusement park investigating a rumored drug deal involving a dealer in hiding named Asakichi Yakura; At the same time, they intentionally interfere with Takagi's date. Shiratori has one of the officers bring the Detective Boys to the park and puts them in Takagi and Sato's care. Takagi meanwhile plans to present Sato with a ring inside his green backpack and discovers a bag of heroin inside; He realizes he picked up the wrong backpack during the roller coaster ride. They return to the ride and learn from the attendant that no one returned asking for the backpack. Conan discerns the bag's owner was delivering the drugs without knowing what was inside causing Sato to suspect Yakura's involvement. The backpack's strap reveals the owner wears it on his left shoulder suggesting he is left handed, and proceeds to a photo-booth to examine the passengers with them on the roller coaster. The officers meanwhile misunderstand Sato's conversation, believing Kekkon (血痕, lit. Bloodstain) to mean Kekkon (結婚, lit. Marriage) and Heroin to mean Hirōen (披露宴, lit. Reception) and causing them to believe Takagi proposed and allures them to seek out Takagi's backpack with the ring. At the photo booth, the four suspected are a golfer, a baseball player, soccer player, and swimmer. The golfer's writing reveals him to be left handed due to the ink smearing to the right.
359	6	"Metropolitan Police Detective Love Story 5 (Part 2)"; Transliteration: "Honchō no Keiji Koimonogatari 5 (Kōhen)" (Japanese: 本庁の刑事恋物語5（後編）)	Nana Harada	N/A	May 10, 2004
They confront the golfer and discover he is not the owner of the backpack. Conan investigates the backpack's contents and upon sniffing oil from a rag, reveals the owner to the baseballer. Conan explains that out of the other three athletes, the baseballer uses the oil for his baseball glove. They then search for the baseballer and upon finding him, follow him to the aquatic show. When Sato discovers the baseballer is meeting with Yakura, she attempts to apprehend him. Yakura manages to escape Sato's grip and flees towards the ferris wheel. The fireworks and ferris wheel causes Sato to remember a traumatic moment halting her to a standstill. Conan manages to knock Yakura into the ocean and Takagi's backpack and ring is lost along with it. The police apprehend Yakura and satisfied with Takagi's lost, leaves. Takagi comforts Sato and promises her he will not leave her.
360	7	"A Mysterious Spring Beetle"; Transliteration: "Fushigi na Haru no Kabutomushi" (Japanese: 不思議な春のかぶと虫)	Nana Harada	Yuko Okabe	May 17, 2004
The Detective Boys visit a pet shop and find the owner, Minoru Shirai, dead. They find a Rhinoceros beetle and pamphlets of an insect museum at Gunma Prefecture. Takagi drives the Detective Boys to the museum where they learn that a truck load of Rhinoceros beetles were stolen from the van. Conan investigates and realizes Shirai and an accomplice were the thieves and that the accomplice was the murderer. Deducing from his investigation that the accomplice is one of the employees at the museum, Conan tranquilizes Yamamura and reveals Takashi Ishida to be the culprit. Conan explains that evidence on Shirai's body suggested he was murdered in the van and was strangled by a strap from the museum. As further evidence, Conan reveals that he saw a message from Ishida's phone that proves he was selling the stolen Rhinoceros beetles. Ishida confesses to the murder and explains that Shirai was always insulting him.
361	8	"Teitan High School's Ghost Story (Part 1)"; Transliteration: "Teitan Koukō Gakkou Kaidan (Zenpen)" (Japanese: 帝丹高校学校怪談（前編）)	Hideaki Oniwa	N/A	May 24, 2004
Sonoko, Ran, and Conan go to the school where they discover the real Dr. Araide is back. He informs Conan of what happened, and told him that Jodie told him to tell him everything. Later, Sonoko rants on about the death of a student terrorizing the school, and tells them stories to support this claim. Later the desk is found outside with a name on it. What's strange is that it's raining, yet, there's no footprints in the mud.
362	9	"Teitan High School's Ghost Story (Part 2)"; Transliteration: "Teitan Koukō Gakkou Kaidan (Kōhen)" (Japanese: 帝丹高校学校怪談（後編）)	Hideaki Oniwa	N/A	May 31, 2004
Conan solves the case and reveals the culprit was a close friend to the dead student. The culprit reveals that he found his friend's desk in the storage room with a name on it, thinking he was murdered. The other students reveal that he died saving a student that fell off the stairs while holding a heavy sculpture. Another student explains that his desk was put in the storage room to store his desk for graduation and was not to hide evidence. Dr.Araide reveals that the dead student held no grudges when he died.
363	10	"The City's Crows"; Transliteration: "Tokai no Karasu" (Japanese: 都会のカラス)	Rokou Ogiwara	Nobuo Ogizawa	June 7, 2004
An old lady is found dead after a pot falls on her from the top of a building. Officer Chiba is sent to investigate, and Conan helps him figure out who the culprit it really is. The news, of course, comes to a shock to Amy, who just happens to look up the culprit.
364	11	"The Synchronicity Case (Part 1)"; Transliteration: "Shinkuronishiti Jiken (Zenpen)" (Japanese: シンクロニシティ事件（前編）)	Minoru Tozawa	Hiro Masaki	June 14, 2004
Mouri is hired to stalk a man. He follows the man and finds out his attempted murder on a woman. He later flees but falls off a building. Later they find out his twin brother also died at the same time he did. They decided they are two separate cases but Conan is suspicious as the man attacked the woman who has no relationship to him.
365	12	"The Synchronicity Case (Part 2)"; Transliteration: "Shinkuronishiti Jiken (Kōhen)" (Japanese: シンクロニシティ事件（後編）)	Yukio Okazaki	Hiro Masaki	June 21, 2004
After interrogating the woman, they learn her boyfriend was a gold digger and that he was spotted talking with the attacker from before. Conan figures out that the two exchanged murder targets so they would not be suspected of the murder. The culprit reveals that he did it so his gold digger career would not be endangered.
366	13	"The Tragedy of the Pier in Plain Sight (Part 1)"; Transliteration: "Marumie Futō no Sangeki (Zenpen)" (Japanese: 丸見え埠頭の惨劇（前編）)	Nana Harada	N/A	July 5, 2004
The Detective Boys are out fishing with Dr Agasa. Since the ship came to pick up the fishing members, one of crews calls their fellow, but the man is found to be poisoned. Remaining Three Crews of the poisoned man got involved to be suspect of the case by the circumstances of the Crime Scene.
367	14	"The Tragedy of the Pier in Plain Sight (Part 2)"; Transliteration: "Marumie Futō no Sangeki (Kōhen)" (Japanese: 丸見え埠頭の惨劇（後編）)	Akihiko Nishiyama	N/A	July 12, 2004
Conan investigates and with evidence proves who the culprit is. The culprit reveals that he did it to the victim for cheating on his (victim)'s wife. The wife reveals that he divorced her not because he was cheating, but because he was going to burrow money to start up a business, and if that business failed, he did not want the debt collectors to burrow his wife. Agasa arrives and reveals that the victim made a full recovery and that he will forgive the culprit if he catches fish for his wife.
368	15	"The Candy House the Witch Lives In"; Transliteration: "Majo ga Sumu Okashi no Ie" (Japanese: 魔女が棲むお菓子の家)	Nana Harada	Michiko Tsumura Hiroshi Kashiwabara	July 26, 2004
Sonoko takes Conan and Ran to the "Candy House", a Hansel and Gretel-themed store specializing in various sweets and candies. The trio then meets three masters who make pastries and puddings: Maeda Gou, Fujino Yasuo and Morimoto Tomomi. Behind the scenes of the shop is their boss, Sachiko Hashigaki, who has stern words for her employees about their performance. When things have cooled down, Sachiko is found bludgeoned to death, her employees are now suspects, but no murder weapon can be found. Conan discovers that they all have a motive and finds wood shavings in different parts of the crime scene. He goes on to stun Sonoko and reveals that a real log was used to kill Sachiko, and the only suspect who specializes in making cakes that resemble pieces of logs is Fujino Yasuo. As evidence, Fujino baked the murder weapon into a cake which is found at his station. Fujino confesses that Sachiko promised that he could leave and start his own company if he won a baking competition. Hatred grew when Sachiko went back on her promise, seeing how Fujino's popularity is the source of her clientele plus the abuse he was suffering from her hands. Sachiko is the prime example of the witch in Hansel and Gretel, the story which the Candy House was themed after.
369	16	"A Lucky Man's Suspense"; Transliteration: "Tsuiteru Otoko no Sasupensu" (Japanese: ツイてる男のサスペンス)	Hideaki Oniwa	Nobuo Ogizawa	August 2, 2004
Doctor Yokoto Ōwada of the Beika Central Hospital wins the third place prize at a raffle. The raffle makes it his third winning of the week. When Conan returns home, he discovers that the one year supply of beer that Doctor Ōwada won is a lie because the draw didn't start yet. The next day, the Detective Boys find out the raffle had been fixed by a tall and slender woman posing as the doctor's wife and when walking down the streets, they overhear gossip of the doctor's other made up winnings. Following the trail of gossip, they soon find the woman responsible for the rumors named Akiko Shiina and her motive. Conan dismisses the case to trick the Detective Boys into going home, but returns at night to stop Akiko from murdering the doctor.
370	17	"Running Away in a Game"; Transliteration: "Nigemawaru Geemu Sofuto" (Japanese: 逃げ回るゲームソフト)	Akihiko Nishiyama	Michiru Shimada	August 9, 2004
Conan and the gang visit a game company where they end up with a tape they believe to be a new edition of a video game. They end up being hunted down by the president of the gaming company, but they don't know why, until they actually put in the tape and see something that puts their lives in danger.
371	18	"A Course Without Protest (Part 1)"; Transliteration: "Mono Iwanu Kouro (Zenpen)" (Japanese: 物言わぬ航路（前編）)	Roko Ogiwara	N/A	August 23, 2004
Kogoro is invited to attend an interview with famed baseball player Toshizo Nose. Ran and Conan tag along hoping to get photos of Nose as he is Eri's favorite baseball player. They see on TV, sports reporter Masaharu Motoyama, getting ready for the aforementioned interview. Across town, Toshizo talks with Masaharu, unaware that he is planning to murder him. The next day on the streets, while cryptically referencing historical terms, Masaharu pulls a knife out and stabs Toshizo to death. Kogoro and the group discover Toshizo dead, and Conan instantly suspects Masaharu to be the culprit especially after calling for the police, despite Toshizo laying face down with no injuries. Masaharu has an alibi as he was on a direct flight at the time of the murder. It is discovered that both Masaharu and Toshizo were both on the same team before Masaharu left for a job as a sports reporter. When Conan closes in on Masaharu, he begins seeing Vermouth, possibly hinting ties with the Black Organization.
372	19	"A Course Without Protest (Part 2)"; Transliteration: "Mono Iwanu Kouro (Kōhen)" (Japanese: 物言わぬ航路（後編）)	Roko Ogiwara	N/A	August 30, 2004
Conan continues logically shaking Masaharu, who he believes murdered his friend, Toshizo Nose. After checking certain items in the car, Conan drops subtle hints allowing Kogoro to solve the case. After catching Masaharu hysterically laughing at the airport, Kogoro theorizes that he actually took two flights instead of one to create an alibi: one from Miyazaki to Tokyo, then from Tokyo to Okinawa, where Masaharu stabbed him to death. He went back to the airport pretending to have just gotten off the direct flight. As evidence, Masaharu stole Ran's tennis ball container hoping to destroy it plus the murder weapon being found in his trunk. Masaharu confesses how Toshizo deceived him into thinking his bad habit affected his pitching, when in reality, Toshizo wanted Masaharu out of the way. Kogoro lectures him how murder did nothing for him except buy a jail to prison.
373	20	"Deadly Poisonous Spider Trap"; Transliteration: "Moudoku Kumo no Wana" (Japanese: 猛毒蜘蛛の罠)	Minoru Tozawa	Yoko Abe Hiroshi Kashiwabara	September 6, 2004
Conan and the group meet spider researchers. One of them gets a call, and they rush to the facility on to find their Professor fallen deadly to a poisonous spider. Conan discovers that the spider was already dead before the Professor came into contact with it, and there's a needle on the ear piece, pointing to murder.
374	21	"A Code of Stars and Tobacco (Part 1)"; Transliteration: "Hoshi to Tabako no Angō (Zenpen)" (Japanese: 星と煙草の暗号（前編）)	Nana Harada	N/A	October 18, 2004
For an astronomical observation, Conan and the group went to this pension deep inside the mountain. Other than the pension owner, there were also other three people in the pension, the victim's fiancee and the two magazine staff. As they went to the nearby hill to see the stars, they saw a decayed bones and on top of it they found the dying message and then that night the other man from the magazine staff was killed and left another dying message.
375	22	"A Code of Stars and Tobacco (Part 2)"; Transliteration: "Hoshi to Tabako no Angō (Kōhen)" (Japanese: 星と煙草の暗号（後編）)	Yasumi Mikamoto	N/A	October 25, 2004
The bones probably belong to a student who disappeared years before. During the night another guest is murdered, and also the telephone lines are interrupted. After the case Detective Conan looks Yamamura while dialing a number on her phone. Through the notes issued by the telephone keypad, the little detective discovers that the first part of the number that Vermouth was made to contact the leader of black corresponds to the prefix of Tottori prefecture.
376	23	"The Time Limit is 3 P.M.!"; Transliteration: "Taimu Rimitto wa Juugo-ji!" (Japanese: タイムリミットは15時!)	Minoru Tozawa	Naoto Kunioka Hiroshi Kashiwabara	November 1, 2004
The Detective Boys are on a camping trip accompanied by Ran. Later they witness an arguing couple who then leaves. They then set up the tent in the couple's area. Later, the couple returns demanding their place back and the girlfriend decides to let them have it. Later Ran is drugged and kidnapped. The kidnapper is later found in another car in a road accident. Conan reveals the boyfriend hired the kidnapper to murder his girlfriend, but captured Ran instead because of their tent placement. After examining some clues, he realizes that Ran is in a river and that it will flood at 3 o'clock. After saving Ran, everyone becomes exhausted except for Ran who has just woken up from her nap.
377	24	"Momotaro Mystery Solving Tour (Part 1)"; Transliteration: "Momotarō Nazotoki Tsuaa (Zenpen)" (Japanese: 桃太郎謎解きツアー（前編）)	Masahiko Yoda	Junichi Miyashita	November 8, 2004
The Detective Boys along with Dr. Agasa went to the Okayama prefecture to visit the museum. Later, they found a group of guys, childhood friends, who gathered to celebrate the marriage of two of them. The Detective Boys noticed a container floating in the water and discover that inside is a secret message. Fairly and finely, Conan deciphers the meaning of the code that refers to another container. The Detective Boys then undertake a kind of treasure hunt that stops abruptly when Ayumi recovers the body of one of the group next to one of the places where there was a time capsule of the club.
378	25	"Momotaro Mystery Solving Tour (Part 2)"; Transliteration: "Momotarō Nazotoki Tsuaa (Kōhen)" (Japanese: 桃太郎謎解きツアー（後編）)	Kobun Shizuno	Junichi Miyashita	November 15, 2004
Conan discovers that the time capsules were created by the group when the children attended elementary school and that they each had buried a container of others, but a boy died shortly after due to an accident. Carefully considering the case, Conan is convinced that the two deaths are related. Conan solves the case and the final capsule revealed the secret of the group who buried the time capsules, The Peach Tree club.
379	26	"The Case of the Furisode at the Hidden Hot Spring on a Snowy Night (Part 1)"; Transliteration: "Hitō Yuki Yami Furisode Jiken (Zenpen)" (Japanese: 秘湯雪闇振袖事件（前編）)	Minoru Tozawa	Hirohito Ochi	November 22, 2004
Conan, Ran, and Kogoro take a trip to a hot springs lodge. One of the guests, Harumi, asks Kogoro to investigate a case from five years ago. Her friend had been accused of selling drugs, and as a result committed suicide. Harumi knows that her friend was innocent and believes that two of the other guests there were the real culprits. The two women are found murdered, but in both cases it's a locked room case and it resembles the legendary curse of the goddess of vengeance. Ema is murdered in a shrine with Long Sleeve Kimonos lying around her while Asuka is found murdered in the women's hot spring surrounded by Obis.
380	27	"The Case of the Furisode at the Hidden Hot Spring on a Snowy Night (Part 2)"; Transliteration: "Hitō Yuki Yami Furisode Jiken (Kōhen)" (Japanese: 秘湯雪闇振袖事件（後編）)	Nana Harada	Hirohito Ochi	November 29, 2004
Conan notices that the footprints outside the shrine are too shallow and sees that there is a crack in the ceiling in front of the hot spring; from these and other clues he is able to deduce how the culprit faked an alibi. Conan finds out the identity of the culprit and their relationship to the case that happened five years ago. Conan tranquilizes Kogoro and solves the case; Kogoro eventually wakes up and being disorientated falls into the hot spring.
381	28	"Which One's Deduction Show (Part 1)"; Transliteration: "Docchi no Suiri Shō (Zenpen)" (Japanese: どっちの推理ショー（前編）)	Rokou Ogiwara	N/A	December 6, 2004
Heiji and Kazuha make a surprise visit. Later at a restaurant, Heiji and Kazuha argue for what they should attend tomorrow, a theatre or a baseball game. So Mouri the Private Detective decides to let the solver of a murder to choose the event and everyone agrees. Heiji, and Conan are against Mouri, Ran and Kazuha.
382	29	"Which One's Deduction Show (Part 2)"; Transliteration: "Docchi no Suiri Shō (Kōhen)" (Japanese: どっちの推理ショー（後編）)	Rokou Ogiwara	N/A	December 13, 2004
Heiji and Conan figured out the trick of Culprit and also found that Kazuha and Ran got trouble with the case. Thus Heiji decides to throw the match for Kazuha but he accidentally solves the case. Kazuha tells Ran she does not really mind, as she just wanted to see Heiji's excitement when he solves a case.
383	30	"Miracle at Koshien Ball Park! The Defiants Face the Dark Demon^{2 hrs.}" Transliteration: "Koushien no Kiseki! Mienai Akuma ni Makezu Kirai" (Japanese: 甲子園の奇跡!見えない悪魔に負けず嫌い)	Minoru Tozawa	Yasuichiro Yamamoto Masato Sato	December 20, 2004
This special Christmas episode of "Detective Conan" is introduced by Heiji Hattori, Conan Edogawa, Ran Mori, and Kazuha Toyama. Heiji won the bet in the previous episode to go see a baseball game and so it's decided that they're all going to the high school baseball finals in Koshien Stadium. But there is a mysterious guy willing to commit a suicide bombing there. This incident just puts more stress on Conan and Heiji, even though they came to a ball game for amusement and relaxation. The unknown person gives them a chance to stop him, however. Heiji and Conan are both struggling to crack the codes, sent by the mysterious man, before the bomb goes off. Earlier, Conan and Heiji witnessed the person walk by them and they thought he dropped his cell phone, when he purposely left it there to "play the inevitable game" with them, consisting of cryptic text messages. In order to solve this case and save countless lives, Heiji and Conan would need a lot a background information dealing with one of Japan's favourite pastimes, baseball.
384	31	"The Target Is Kogoro Mori"; Transliteration: "Hyouteki wa Mōri Kogoro" (Japanese: 標的は毛利小五郎)	Yasumi Mikamoto	Takeo Ohno	January 17, 2005
Mouri is targeted by a killer who is after Kimura. Mouri accidentally took his jacket at a bar and now the killer is trying to kill him. Conan finds out that Kimura is not who he seems to be. Kimura is said to be at a lake and Mouri goes to investigate. There he is seemingly shot by the culprit but, in fact, Conan has set a dummy in Mouri's place. The culprit reveals his motive was revenge.
385	32	"The Dissonance of the Stradivarius (Overture)"; Transliteration: "Sutoradibariusu no Fukyouwaon (Zensoukyoku)" (Japanese: ストラディバリウスの不協和音（前奏曲）)	Nana Harada	N/A	January 24, 2005
Conan tries to figure out the phone number to the boss of the Black Organization. Mouri is invited by a granddaughter of a rich household to solve these mysterious accidents that happen whenever someone tries to play a Stradivarius for her grandfather on his birthday. Four incidents have happened on that day already and it is about to come up again. Later a fire occurs and a man is burned to death.
386	33	"The Dissonance of the Stradivarius (Interlude)"; Transliteration: "Sutoradibariusu no Fukyouwaon (Kansoukyoku)" (Japanese: ストラディバリウスの不協和音（間奏曲）)	Roko Ogiwara	N/A	January 31, 2005
It is revealed that the house hold are killed off one by one in the order of the C Concert scale. The grandmother of the house was revealed to be emotionally shocked after the death of her son; Every midnight, she would leave her room carrying the Stradivarius like a child. That night, she breaks the violin, and falls out of the window. It was revealed the culprit taped up an object to lure her to the window where she would fall to her doom.
387	34	"The Dissonance of the Stradivarius (Last Tune)"; Transliteration: "Sutoradibariusu no Fukyouwaon (Gosoukyoku)" (Japanese: ストラディバリウスの不協和音（後奏曲）)	Shigeru Yamazaki	N/A	February 7, 2005
Conan figures out the object was the real Stradivarius that lured the grandmother to fall to her death. He reveals the culprit to be Kyousuke. Kyousuke reveals that the Stradivarius was originally from his family. One day, the Kyousuke's father was asked by his brother, Choichirou, to burrow the Stradivarius. He then attempts to send back a replica to Kyousuke's father, but was found out. In an argument, Kyousuke's father falls down the stairs. Choichirou orders his family to not call the ambulance and to stage it as robbery. This is the cause of Kyousuke's father's death. As Kyousuke is taken away, Conan asks him the tune of a song from the cellphone numbers and finds out the Boss of the Black Organization's number is the song of "Seven Children".
388	35	"Kogoro Gets Drunk in Satsuma (Part 1)"; Transliteration: "Satsuma ni You Kogorou (Zenpen)" (Japanese: 薩摩に酔う小五郎（前編）)	Minoru Tozawa	Nobuo Ogizawa	February 14, 2005
Kogoro is invited Kagoshima for a variety talk show to promote their local shochu and is later invited by Takakuma Shochu sample their handmade sake. Tatsumura wants to increase production of sake by mechanizing the production process at the expense of quality. Fumiko takes Kogoro on a tour of the city and asks him to decline Tatsumura's offer to be a spokesperson. Later Tatsumura is found to be missing; there is blood on the floor and evidence to suggest that he was struck with a blunt object and kidnapped. Two days pass and then through an anonymous tip the police discover Tatsumura dead in his car in a park.
389	36	"Kogoro Gets Drunk in Satsuma (Part 2)"; Transliteration: "Satsuma ni You Kogorou (Kōhen)" (Japanese: 薩摩に酔う小五郎（後編）)	Yasumi Mikamoto	Nobuo Ogizawa	February 21, 2005
Conan, Kogoro, and the police continue to search for clues to solving the case. Conan learns more about Tatsumura, the current owner, Satoshi, and the company's history from one of the employees. Satoshi is unwilling to fire Tatsumura because he was responsible for saving the company years ago. Conan learns that Fumiko used to be a nurse, and that she made sure Tatsumura got a check up the day before he got murdered/kidnapped. Everyone gathers to hear Kogoro's deduction, and Conan reveals the culprit's trick.

== Notes ==
- ^1 hr. One hour long special episode.
- ^2 hrs. Two hour long special episode.
