= Case Closed season 15 =

Season of television series

Case Closed
- Season 15
- The cover of the first DVD compilation for season fifteen of Detective Conan released by Shogakukan
- No. of episodes: 39

Release
- Original network: NNS (ytv)
- Original release: January 23, 2006 – February 19, 2007

Season chronology
- ← Previous; Season 14 Next → Season 16

The fifteenth season of the Case Closed anime was directed by Masato Satō and produced by TMS Entertainment and Yomiuri Telecasting Corporation. The series is based on Gosho Aoyama's Case Closed manga series. In Japan, the series is titled Detective Conan (名探偵コナン, Meitantei Conan) but was changed due to legal issues with the title Detective Conan. The episodes' plot follows Conan Edogawa's daily adventures.

The episodes use six pieces of theme music: three opening themes and three ending themes. The first opening theme is "Shōdō" (衝動, lit. "Impulse") by B'z until episode 437. The second opening theme is "100 mono Tobira" (100もの扉, lit. "100 Doors") by Rina Aiuchi and U-ka Saegusa until episode 456. The third opening theme is "Kumo ni Notte" (雲に乗って, lit. "Ride on a Cloud") by U-ka Saegusa in dB for the rest of the season. The first ending theme is "Kanashii Hodo Anata ga Suki" (悲しいほど 貴方が好き, lit. "I love you as much as I'm sad") by Zard until episode 437. The second ending theme is "Mou Kimi dake wo Hanashitari wa Shinai" (もう君だけを離したりはしない, lit. "I won't let you go anymore") by Aya Kamiki until episode 458. The third ending theme is "Shiroi Yuki" (白い雪, lit. "White Snow") by Mai Kuraki for the rest of the season.

The season initially ran from January 23, 2006, through February 19, 2007, on Nippon Television Network System in Japan. Episodes 427 to 465 were later collected into ten DVD compilations by Shogakukan. They were released between December 22, 2006, and September 28, 2007, in Japan.

== Episode list ==
No.	No. in season	Title	Directed by	Written by	Original air date
427	1	"The Super Secret Road to School (Part 1)"; Transliteration: "Chōhimitsu no Tsūgakuro (Zenpen)" (Japanese: 超秘密の通学路（前編）)	Roko Ogiwara	N/A	January 23, 2006
Mitsuhiko tells the Detective Boys that Shouko Amemiya, a girl that strongly resembles Haibara, is missing. Conan considers the possibility that the Black Organization kidnapped her and investigates. They learn that Amemiya's parents are gone for the week at a funeral and that Amemiya was spotted heading to a convenience store. Conan learns that Amemiya bought a large bottle of juice, powdered milk, and an X-Acto knife.
428	2	"The Super Secret Road to School (Part 2)"; Transliteration: "Chōhimitsu no Tsūgakuro (Kōhen)" (Japanese: 超秘密の通学路（後編）)	Roko Ogiwara	N/A	January 30, 2006
From Amemiya's strange behavior the Detective Boys head to a garage where they find kittens Amemiya had been tending. Unable to find Amemiya, they investigate the area around the garage and realize there had been a recent car accident. After checking around hospitals, they find Amemiya recovering in Tomoaki Araide's clinic.
429	3	"Two People Who Can't Return (Part 1)"; Transliteration: "Mō Modorenai Futari (Zenpen)" (Japanese: もう戻れない二人（前編）)	Minoru Tozawa	N/A	February 6, 2006
Ran and Sonoko invite their new classmate, Eisuke Hondou to visit Kogoro. At that moment, a client named Atsushi Misumi asks Kogoro to search for his girlfriend, Ami. Deducing from her last words, they realize Ami is waiting for Misumi at the place where they first met. They are driven by Misumi to Gunma Prefecture where they find Ami in a sealed up car dead. Misumi breaks into the car by using a bat and breaking through the front window and proceeds to open the door by cutting open the tape from the passenger side. They discover that Ami died from carbon monoxide poisoning and conclude it to be suicide. Conan investigates and realizes it was a murder and believes Misumi's to be the murderer. He then continues to investigate in order to find out how Misumi was able to exit the car while the doors were sealed up with gaffer tape.
430	4	"Two People Who Can't Return (Part 2)"; Transliteration: "Mō Modorenai Futari (Kōhen)" (Japanese: もう戻れない二人（後編）)	Nana Harada	N/A	February 13, 2006
After investigating, Conan realizes how the murder was done. Conan tranquilizes Kogoro and declares Misumi to be the murderer. He reveals that Misumi drove Ami in that car and drugged her to sleep. He then taped all the doors but made a cut along the passenger door allowing him to leave. Conan explains when Misumi broke into the car to save Ami, he only pretended to cut the passenger door open and that it was cut already. As evidence to prove he was the murderer, Conan reveals that the book in the car came out on that same day and that Misumi's fingerprints were on the cover. However, Misumi reported that his girlfriend went missing yesterday. Misumi confesses and reveals his girlfriend was cheating on him even though he gave her so much.
431	5	"Metropolitan Police Detective Love Story 7 (Part 1)"; Transliteration: "Honchō no Keiji Koimonogatari 7 (Zenpen)" (Japanese: 本庁の刑事恋物語7（前編）)	Nana Harada	N/A	February 20, 2006
Mōri, Ran, and Conan are at a café when they run into Takagi who is aiming to pick up girls. Meanwhile, he finds Sato there doing the same. After a tense date with two strangers, Conan realizes from the conversation that a boy home alone is in danger. When they arrive at their house, the boy has been kidnapped. The kidnapper leaves an email demanding money.
432	6	"Metropolitan Police Detective Love Story 7 (Part 2)"; Transliteration: "Honchō no Keiji Koimonogatari 7 (Kōhen)" (Japanese: 本庁の刑事恋物語7（後編）)	Takashi Sudo	N/A	February 27, 2006
After solving clues Takagi leaves suddenly and Conan reveals who the kidnapper is. Just then, the boy returns home unharmed, making them believe the culprit will try to make a run for it. After arriving to his house it is revealed that a winning lottery ticket was returned to the culprit in his mailbox, making him release his friends had no intention of stealing from him and the guilt of his crime caused him to suicide. Takagi manages to save his life while Sato yells at him for the danger he could have been in.
433	7	"Conan: A Strange Child"; Transliteration: "Konan Hen na Ko" (Japanese: コナン変な子)	Minoru Tozawa	Takeo Ohno	March 6, 2006
Kogoro and Conan visits a famous author named Osamu Umezu in order to have his book signed. Later they spot Osamu's secretary, Mikami Touru, running to Osamu's house. They learn that Mikami that Osamu is not answering his phone calls and he was going to check up on him. They accompany him to Osamu's apartment and find Osamu dead. Evidence suggests it was suicide but Kogoro notices blood on the trash bin and reveals that it was a murder. Osamu's assistant and son are suspects to the murder due to being the only ones with keys to the apartment. Conan investigates and after putting Kogoro to sleep, impersonates him and reveals the murderer to be Mikami. He reveals that Mikami tied a string on the roof where it hung in front of Osamu's window. After poisoning Osamu, Mikami left the apartment and locked the door. He afterwards went to the roof and using the string he set up, sends the key back to Osamu's apartment. Conan reveals that Osamu's died holding his trophy he won with his book. Conan explains the trophy was held upside down to reveal Osamu's book titles were and Mikami's name was also palindromes. As evidence, Conan reveals that Osamu managed to rip a button from Mikami's shirt and using the gum he had, stuck it onto the sofa. Mikami confesses to his crime and reveals that Osamu stole his manuscript and published the book as his own.
434	8	"The Great Dog Coeur's Triumph"; Transliteration: "Meiken Kūru no Otegara" (Japanese: 名犬クールのお手柄)	Roko Ogiwara	Kazunari Kochi	April 10, 2006
Conan and Ran pass by a dog park and befriend two couples whom each own a dogs; one is named Musashi and the other is named Coeur. Yoriko Nakatani, the neighbor of the owner of Musashi, the Tsutsumi couple, asks Kogoro to investigate the dog Musashi who acts aggressively to her. Conan and Ran disclose they believe she did something to upset the dog, causing her to leave. The next day, Nakatani's mother in law is seemingly killed by Musashi when his teeth marks are found on her throat. Conan investigates and is at a lost until Coeur finds a clay modeling of a dog's jaw and realizes how the murder is done. The police reveal Conan's deduction explaining Nakatani used the clay model to puncture the victim's throat. The blood on Musashi's mouth was from licking the wound in an attempt to ease the bleeding. Nakatani confesses and explains her mother in law was criticizing her on her visits and publicly exclaimed she wished she had chosen a better wife for her son.
435	9	"Information Gathered About the Detective Boys (Part 1)"; Transliteration: "Tantei-dan ni Chūme Shuzai (Zenpen)" (Japanese: 探偵団に注目取材（前編）)	Akira Tsuchiya	N/A	April 17, 2006
A free-lance writer comes to do a story about the Detective Boys. They go along with their teacher to the writer's apartment, but when they arrive they find that he has been bludgeoned to death. Conan immediately notices that there is blood wiped from one of the buttons on the answering machine as well as blood on the doorknob. He suggests that the culprit may have left a message to establish an alibi. Haibara warns Conan not to show off because he'll attract attention, so he tries to guide Takagi and Megure to the clues in his usual childish manner. The Detective Boys on the other hand feel like Conan's childish antics are making them look immature.
436	10	"Information Gathered About the Detective Boys (Part 2)"; Transliteration: "Tantei-dan ni Chūme Shuzai (Kōhen)" (Japanese: 探偵団に注目取材（後編）)	Minoru Tozawa	N/A	April 24, 2006
Three out of the four messages on the answering machine are suspect, but in each one there is something going on which helps them verify the time and place of the call. In the first Haruka leaves the victim a message with the T.V. playing in the background. In the second they hear the train conductor who has allergy troubles. In the third the caller asks someone for the date and time during the call. Conan with the help of the other Detective Boys drops hints for the police until they realize that only one of the alibis could have been faked. They bring the suspect in and they're able to find the victim's blood on his motorcycle.
437	11	"Aya Ueto and Shinichi - The Promise from 4 Years Ago"; Transliteration: "Ueto Aya to Shinichi Yonenmae no Yakusoku" (Japanese: 上戸彩と新一 4年前の約束)	Masato Sato	Kazunari Kochi	May 8, 2006
Aya, who made a promise with Shinichi, comes back to his house to ask help for a case involving her grandma and her daughter that died at the age of 17. Conan solves the case and reveals that the promise was that in four years, when they meet again, Aya would be a real actress, and Shinchi would be a real detectiive. The episode ends with Conan getting a text message from Ran to Shinchi asking what the promise was.
438	12	"The Pursuit of the Fish E-mail"; Transliteration: "Osakana Mēru no Tsuiseki" (Japanese: お魚メールの追跡)	Takashi Sudo	N/A	May 15, 2006
The waitress of Poirot Cafe, Azusa Enomoto, reported she received strange messages from a boy, suggesting he might be kidnapped or trapped in a location without food and water. The only way to find him is by reading his text messages. The boy only knows how to send, but does not know how receive. Conan must put the clues he gives together to find out his location.
439	13	"And It'd Be Nice If Everybody Disappeared"; Transliteration: "Soshite Daremo Inakunarebaī" (Japanese: そして誰もいなくなればいい)	Minoru Tozawa	Nobuo Ogizawa	May 22, 2006
A man named Sasamoto is nearly killed by a falling cinder block. He believes that it's his old college friend, Hikage, who disappeared 3 years ago, but since has written a murder prophesy novel where he kills his 3 friends from college. One of the friends, Nesu, was already discovered murdered in a park, and so the two remaining friends seek Kogoro's help. A package arrives for the other friend, Kamio, which explodes though it only causes minor injury. Hikage then attempts to run over Sasamoto, but from the brake marks Conan questions the criminal's actual intent. Conan does some investigation and find out that Hikage brought his masterpiece to Kamio who told him it was worthless. Hikage went to the mountains where he committed suicide. After tranquilizing Kogoro, Conan reveals that Kamio was being blackmailed by Nesu over Hikage's death. Kamio then devised a plot to kill Nesu disguised as Hikage, and then pretend to target both himself and Sasamoto.
440	14	"The Car Stunt's Utmost Limit"; Transliteration: "Kyokugen no Kaa Sutanto" (Japanese: 極限のカースタント)	Akira Tsuchiya	Junichi Miyashita	May 29, 2006
The Detective Boys visit a Kamen Yaiba Stunt Show. The director, Shinji Fukamachi, and assistant director, Hidehiko Nakasato, scold the stunt driver, Kengo Rikiishi, for doing such a dangerous stunt with the car. Kengo blows off their words and has cameraman Daisaku Kijima retake his next shot later. The directors tell Kengo that he was to wait for an RC car identical to his own to do the off the roof scene, which angers Kengo and thinks the crew don't respect his skills as a driver. Shinji sees Masao Nishiwaki, the mechanical technician, on the readiness of the cars for a retake. The kids go and meet with the crew, and Mitsuhiko and Genta go see the cars which Genta places a sticker on the RC car, to make it look cooler, but the technician comes to take it to the roof. The kids are having fun until they hear a fight. Kengo has had enough of the director telling him not to do the stunt again that he does it in a blind rage, which is caught on film by Daisaku. As he makes it to the top, Kengo didn't get out and dies on impact. Conan sees the seat belt was loose, meaning Kengo tried to get out, but something prevented him from getting out. Conan and the crew look at the footage of the event, then someone alerted the police and Conan pursues them. The kids mistake Conan's actions as him investigating without them, and follow him to the roof where he says the accident was a carefully planned murder. As Megure takes statements from the crew, who explain Kengo's want to do the stunt was what killed him, and each fight with each other saying who they think is the killer. Conan uses Agasa to solve the case by proving Fukamachi is the killer who prompted Kengo to do the stunt. Fukamachi had Car A, which had no air bomb, driven by Kengo which was right where he was. But Kengo swapt Car A for B on the roof unaware of the bomb being in Car A, and Conan shows the sticker was on the car- until Genta says he put one on both cars. But Conan shows the corner of the coat was caught on the car which crashed, but not on the one on camera when it started. Conan pulls the remote from the director's pocket and has the technician prove the crashed car is the RC car and the director had it lock the seat belt to hold Kengo as he fell. He confesses and states that he was in debt and used the production money to pay it off, also Kengo didn't drive but the RC was driven by the remote preventing him from getting out. On their way home, Genta is full, Ayumi is fawning over her autograph by Yaiba, and Mitsuhiko, Agasa, and Conan are Covered in stickers by Genta.
441	15	"The Final "Ahh""; Transliteration: "Saigo no Ān" (Japanese: 最期のアーン)	Roko Ogiwara	Takeo Ohno	June 5, 2006
Kogoro and Conan are brought to an apartment to examine the death of a man named Yamamoto. It is presumed a suicide as evidence project he put a gun in his mouth and firing. His friend is suspected of murdering him as he left the crime scene without calling the police. When Kogoro is fed strawberries, Conan realizes who the murderer is. After investigating Yamamoto's dentist, Conan tranquilizes Kogoro and reveals the murderer to be Yamamoto's neighbor, Yumi Suzuki. Conan reveals that Yumi Yamamoto's dentist assistant and deduces Yumi entered Yamamoto's apartment and offered to treat him. When he opened his mouth, Yumi shot him with a gun. As evidence, Conan reveals that Yamamoto's coffee stirrer is actually Yumi's dental mirror.
442	16	"The Man Obstructed by the Steel Frame"; Transliteration: "Tekkotsu ni Habamareta Otoko" (Japanese: 鉄骨に阻まれた男)	Yasuyuki Shinozaki	Nobuo Ogizawa	June 12, 2006
A struggling artist named Daijirou Manaka is nearly killed by a falling I beam. While he's lying in the hospital Takagi and the Detective Boys go through his bag and find his license, a rope, a pair of gloves, and a suicide note. Daijirou wakes up and when Takagi asks him about the bag he claims to have amnesia, but Conan notices he is lying. Daijirou's only living relative is his uncle who has refused to help him unless he gives up on being an artist. Conan deduces that this caused a deep seated hatred for his uncle who he planned to kill while making it look like a suicide. Conan goes to Daijirou's uncle's mansion and finds out that he has secretly been buying Daijirou's paintings. He eventually convinces him to go and stop Daijirou from committing suicide. Daijirou finally realizes that his uncle does care about him.
443	17	"Clam Digging With a Sigh (Part 1)"; Transliteration: "Tameiki Shiohigari (Zenpen)" (Japanese: ため息潮干狩り（前編）)	Minoru Tozawa	N/A	June 26, 2006
The Junior Detective Club are at the beach digging up clams. Soon they encounter a college group of students on similar excursion. Later, however, one of the college boy is found dead from poisoning in the car in which they had ridden.
444	18	"Clam Digging With a Sigh (Part 2)"; Transliteration: "Tameiki Shiohigari (Kōhen)" (Japanese: ため息潮干狩り（後編）)	Roko Ogiwara	N/A	July 3, 2006
The boy is dead because of the cyanide present in his bottle of green tea. Conan is convinced that this is murder and, with the help of Detective Boys, recovers evidence to confirm his theory and the offender is arrested by Detective Jyugo.
445	19	"Secret of the Russian Blue"; Transliteration: "Roshian Burū no Himitsu" (Japanese: ロシアンブルーの秘密)	Akira Tsuchiya	N/A	July 10, 2006
Kogoro is asked by a man to solve a coded text message from his daughter since she refused to tell him the meaning of the text message. Meanwhile, Eri has left her Russian Blue kitten, Goro, in the care of Kogoro. While Kogoro attempts to decipher the message, Goro drops a dictionary to translate English in Japanese causing Kogoro to realize that the English letters of the code can be translated to Japanese. Goro sneaks into Kogoro's video tape collection and where he notices tape is missing and realizes the message contain Hiragana and Katakana with missing strokes. After putting the characters together, Kogoro solves the code which reveals that the man's daughter was planning to buy him a birthday present with her friend. Conan returns home from school and removes the Katsuobushi which was used to lead Goro to give Kogoro hints. Kogoro calls his client and tells him he could not solve it and that the man's daughter is a good girl.
446	20	"The Sealed Western-Style Window (Part 1)"; Transliteration: "Fūin-sareta Yōsō (Zenpen)" (Japanese: 封印された洋窓（前編）)	Takashi Sudo	N/A	July 24, 2006
Sonoko, Ran, Eisuke and Conan were hiking to Sonoko's mountain villa when they discovered the bridge leading to the lodge had collapsed due to disrepair. Out of range of mobile phone signals, they went to a neighbouring villa to request the use of the house phone, and learned that it was recently bought over by a music group "Dorcus" as a den for composing new music. The band members revealed that they got the villa dirt cheap as it was supposed to be haunted. The seller had originally built it together with his older brother. After moving in a while, the older brother declared an evil spirit had invaded the house. Despite nailing shut one of the casement windows on the second floor which he claimed was used by the malevolent presence, the older brother went into despair. One of the servants claimed to have seen the sealed window opened with a peering face behind it. Shortly afterwards, the older brother's wife was found dead, hung in a classical locked-room scenario. This was followed by the older brother's suicide. The younger brother decided to get rid of the property. While waiting for Sonoko's sister, Ayako, to pick them up, Ran and her friends walked around the villa. Eisuke suddenly announced he saw a peering face from the sealed window which mysteriously opened briefly. They rushed into the house and discovered one of the band members hung dead in the same room as the older brother's wife, and in the same locked room style.
447	21	"The Sealed Western-Style Window (Part 2)"; Transliteration: "Fūin-sareta Yōsō (Kōhen)" (Japanese: 封印された洋窓（後編）)	Yasuyuki Shinozaki	N/A	July 31, 2006
Inspector Misao Yamamura arrived to investigate. Conan also tries to gather clues to help, but is limited to what he can do when a sneaky Eisuke starts to spy and watch him. Conan has to use different tactics so he won't seem suspicious to him.
448	22	"The Meguro Sanma Case"; Transliteration: "Meguro no Sanma Jiken" (Japanese: 目黒の秋刀魚事件)	Minoru Tozawa	Takeo Ohno	August 14, 2006
Kogorou, Conan, and Inspector Megure are walking towards a Rakugo (type of Japanese play center) where Kogorou will attempt to act and win the prize of "All you can drink". They make a stop by a famous Rakugo actor's restaurant, Meguro. The Rakugo actor, Ichimatsu, helps out at this shop with Meguro Miya, ex-wife who is also the owner. After the play, Ichimatsu is stabbed and sent to the hospital. The evidence points to the culprit being Meguro Miya, but then Ichimatsu's former apprentice, Manragutei Kisaburou appears claiming he stabbed Ichimatsu. While both of them try to convict themselves, Conan figures out who the culprit is. Once the case is solved, Miya and Kisaburau go visit Ichimatsu in the hospital. At the end Kogorou practices his horrible play forcing Conan, Inspector, and one of the cops to listen.
449	23	"Metropolitan Police Love Story - Fake Wedding^{1 hr.}" Transliteration: "Honchō no Keiji Koimonogatari Itsuwari no Uedingu" (Japanese: 本庁の刑事恋物語 偽りのウエディング)	Masato Sato	Kazunari Kochi	August 21, 2006
Takagi and Miyamoto poses as a bride and groom in order to catch a serial killer/burglar who had threatened to kill the real bride and groom. When Chiba reports that the burned corpse of one of the wedding guests is found near the river, Megure deduces that the victim was killed by the serial killer in order to obtain the wedding invitation. A mysterious video arrives at the wedding party from a friend of the groom. After watching the video, Megure suspects that the killer is already in the chapel and Conan suggests that the bride meet with the guests in order to find the burglar who broke into her house. The bride reports that there are three suspicious guests: a photographer, a snowboarding instructor, and an internet administrator. The groom insists that the wedding proceed, despite Megure's protests. As the bride walks down the aisle, the burglar suddenly appears. However, the groom announces that the burglar was actually a police officer, Chiba, posing as the burglar. Megure points out that Chiba has been by the river and the groom could not have figured out the burglar's true identity. Megure also reveals that the groom was the burglar's accomplice and in the end killed the burglar so he could marry the bride for money. When the groom attempts to escape, he is stopped by Conan and Ran.
450	24	"Trick vs. Magic (Part 1)"; Transliteration: "Torikku vs Majikku (Zenpen)" (Japanese: トリックvsマジック（前編）)	Roko Ogiwara	Kazunari Kochi	August 28, 2006
A famous magician hires Kogoro to keep watch on his staff members, as he believes one of them may be out to kill him. For his first act, he lies on a bed of spikes, and is slammed with another, which has Conan and Kogoro worried until he's revealed to be alive. The next trick does not go so well, and he ends up trapped in a water tank where the entrance has been sealed. By the time it's open and he's rescued, it's too late, and one of his workers is responsible.
451	25	"Trick vs. Magic (Part 2)"; Transliteration: "Torikku vs Majikku (Kōhen)" (Japanese: トリックvsマジック（後編）)	Akira Tsuchiya	Kazunari Kochi	September 4, 2006
Conan fishes around for clues in hopes of finding the true culprit. By the short trip close to the stage, Conan got some clues to resolve the case. After gaining info, he learns who's behind the trick, and exposes the true mastermind behind the death of the magician.
452	26	"The Phantom of the Konpira^{1 hr.}" Transliteration: "Konpira-za no Kaijin" (Japanese: こんぴら座の怪人)	Minoru Tozawa	Junichi Miyashita	September 11, 2006
Conan, Ran, Mouri, and Sonoko travel to Shikoku to see the kabuki play Phantom of the Konpira. It is a play based on Phantom of the Opera. Things start to mimic the play. There are requests for a heroine change, sightings of a phantom, and a deliberate attempt on the heroine, just like Phantom of the Opera. The chief of the stage setting is killed, and the chairman and the sponsor are arrested by circumstantial evidence. Conan uses Sonoko to reveal that heroine tried to ruin the theater's play.
453	27	"Preview Screening of Fate and Friendship"; Transliteration: "Innen to Yūjō no Shishakai" (Japanese: 因縁と友情の試写会)	Yasuichiro Yamamoto	N/A	October 23, 2006
A man buys a ticket to see a movie, which is a sequel to another he and his friends have seen in the past. He gives his ticket to one of his friends, then leaves, but clues he has left behind leads Conan to believe that he has more on his mind. He plans to commit suicide, and plans frame his friend for it afterward. Will Conan be able to prevent his plan before he follows through with it?
454	28	"The Overturned Conclusion (Part 1)"; Transliteration: "Hikkurikaetta Ketsumatsu (Zenpen)" (Japanese: ひっくり返った結末（前編）)	Minoru Tozawa	N/A	October 30, 2006
Manda, a well-known author, is greeted by his editor who needs his manuscript. He tells him that he is almost done and the editor goes and waits in the hotel hallway. Manda sneaks by in a disguise and goes to Haramoto's house, a man who has been ghost writing for Manda. Haramoto gives Manda the script and then tells him about a new mystery he is planning to unveil once Manda introduces him to the right people. Manda kills Haramoto with a vase and steals the detective story before returning to his hotel room.
455	29	"The Overturned Conclusion (Part 2)"; Transliteration: "Hikkurikaetta Ketsumatsu (Kōhen)" (Japanese: ひっくり返った結末（後編）)	Kazunobu Shimizu	N/A	November 6, 2006
Genta hits a baseball through the window of Haramoto's house and breaks a vase. They go inside to apologize and find Haramoto dead. Conan realizes that the victim must have known the killer, and Manda is acting suspicious especially when he interrupts the housekeeper when she mentions the mystery Haramoto was working on. Conan tips the police off, and they arrive at Manda's house and arrest him.
456	30	"The Mystery I Loved"; Transliteration: "Ore ga Aishita Misuterī" (Japanese: 俺が愛したミステリー)	Noriaki Saito	Nobuo Ogizawa	November 13, 2006
A murder occurs in an apartment. The victim is a famous detective author. A card left in the scene shows that the somebody who called himself as character of the author's detective novel took the life of the author. Two suspects were identified: the guard of mansion who likes to drink despite author telling him not to, and the editor of the publishing company who claimed that the author was alive when he left the room. After finding evidence through sushi, the culprit was revealed to have done it out of love for the author's mystery.
457	31	"Sonoko's Red Handkerchief (Part 1)"; Transliteration: "Sonoko no Akai Hankachi (Zenpen)" (Japanese: 園子の赤いハンカチ（前編）)	Toshihiro Ishikawa	N/A	November 20, 2006
Sonoko brought Ran, who in turn brought Conan, to visit the site in the countryside used as location in the filming of a well-received romantic TV series, where the lead actress tied a red handkerchief to a tree branch to enable her lover to find her. The success of the series went beyond expectation and the sleepy rural area became a popular tourist spot where female visitors tied red handkerchieves all over the woods, spoiling Sonoko's scheme to lure Makoto out for a romantic rendezvous. They then encountered a man who claimed to be part of the TV crew, and was commissioned by a fan to find the exact location of tree with the original red handkerchief from the show. Shortly afterwards, he was discovered, stabbed to death, at said spot.
458	32	"Sonoko's Red Handkerchief (Part 2)"; Transliteration: "Sonoko no Akai Hankachi (Kōhen)" (Japanese: 園子の赤いハンカチ（後編）)	Shino Sudo	N/A	November 27, 2006
The murder investigation narrowed to three suspects who were recent arrivals at the nearby inn. Conan deduced the culprit and the cause of the murder. He confronted the culprit at the murder site, but a shock waited him, Ran and Sonoko - the culprit was not alone! The culprit was a yakuza lieutenant who brought henchmen far too numerous for Ran to deal with alone. Makoto arrived in the nick of time, he and Ran fought them off until the police arrived.
459	33	"A Mysterious Man - Overly Strict with Regulations"; Transliteration: "Kaijin Gachigachi Kisoku Otoko" (Japanese: 怪人ガチガチ規則男)	Minoru Tozawa	Nobuo Ogizawa	December 4, 2006
The Junior Detective Club visited An overly strict man, since Ayumi and Mitch suggested to interview him. Later, however, the Club Crews just have seen that the overly strict man is accused of murdering a woman. Is it murder or is it self-defense? Conan must investigate and figure out the truth.
460	34	"Class 1-B's Great Operation!"; Transliteration: "Ichi-nen B-Gumi Daisakusen!" (Japanese: 1年B組大作戦!)	Takahiro Okada	N/A	January 15, 2007
The teacher of the Detective Boys decides to give the class a mental test. Conan is called by the teacher so the class must solve it without him. They solve it with the help of two silent out-cast students. It turns out it was a plan to include the new students so they feel more involved.
461	35	"The Missing Page"; Transliteration: "Kieta Ichi Pēji" (Japanese: 消えた1ページ)	Toshihiro Ishikawa	Aki Kajiwara	January 22, 2007
The Detective Boys are doing a book report when Ayumi notices that the last page to her book, Alec's Adventure, has been torn off. Conan and Ayumi decide to search for Tsukasa Naito, the one who burrowed out the book last. The Detective Boys later discover that a valuable stone, the Sairai Seki (再来石, lit. Return Stone) was stolen. Conan realizes that Tsukasa must have stolen the stone believing it is the same stone from Alec's Adventure, Futabi no Ishi (再びの石, lit. Again Stone), due to the same kanji and wants to use it to regain a lost object. The Detective Boy's investigate Tsukasa's house and discovers a piece of the torn page confirming Conan's suspicion. They find a picture of Tsukasa and his mother at the beach and a coded message behind the photo deduced to be the location of the beach. The Detective Boys follow the clues and arrive at the beach where they find Tsukasa attempting to use the stone to resurrect his dead mother. Tsukasa's father arrives and hugs him making him realize his mother is gone for good. Later that evening, the Detective Boys and Tsukasa returns the stone to the school.
462	36	"The Shadow of the Black Organization - The Young Witness"; Transliteration: "Kuro no Soshiki no Kage Osanai Mokugekisha" (Japanese: 黒の組織の影 幼い目撃者)	Minoru Tozawa	N/A	January 29, 2007
A rockstar named Roku Itakagi has been missing for the past few days. A young boy named Takumi Hashiratani claims that on New Year's Day, he witnessed a man carrying Itakagi in a bag and throwing him over a bridge. Takumi claims that the man had a dark car, a nail on arm, and that he saw a giant glowing hammer in the background. Kogoro is skeptical at first but realizes Takumi is telling the truth when the news confirms that the body of Itakagi was found in a bag floating in a river. From Takumi's testimony, Kogoro, Ran, Conan, and Eisuke search for the bridge where the body was thrown over.
463	37	"The Shadow of the Black Organization - The Strange Illumination"; Transliteration: "Kuro no Soshiki no Kage Kimyō na Shōmei" (Japanese: 黒の組織の影 奇妙な照明)	Takahiro Okada	N/A	February 5, 2007
While investigating, they learn that Itakagi's band logo was of a snake with nails piercing through it. After questioning a tattooist, they learn that the tattoo was new and only three people have gotten it. After further investigation, they are able to deduce the tattoo is on the driver's right arm due to the traffic flow on the bridge and that the only way Takumi could have seen his arm is if the steering wheel was on the right side of the car. They realize that advertisement combined with lights from a building created the silhouette of an upside down hammer; Using this knowledge, they are able to pinpoint where the culprit threw the body off from the bridge. Through the process of elimination, the culprit is revealed to be a man named Kiritani. After the authorities arrest Kiritani, Eisuke attempts to question Kogoro about Rena causing Conan to realize he is in fact searching for her.
464	38	"The Shadow of the Black Organization - The Mystery of the Big Reward"; Transliteration: "Kuro no Soshiki no Kage Nazo no Kōgaku Hōshū" (Japanese: 黒の組織の影 謎の高額報酬)	Shuji Miyahara	N/A	February 12, 2007
Eisuke asks Kogoro to investigate a mystery and believes it is crime related to The Red-Headed League; Eisuke reveals that a man is paid a lot of money to switch the garbage from the neighborhood waste collection with the garbage from the previous garbage day. Kogoro takes Ran, Conan, and Eisuke with him to investigate the neighborhood. They run into Takagi who explains that a woman named Kaneyo Funemoto was recently murdered in the neighborhood after being shot in the back of her head while at home. Her son, Touji Funemoto, says that a strange foreign woman questioned him about an accident he witnessed and believes she murdered his mother. Conan realizes the woman is Vermouth and that the Black Organization must now know that Rena Mizunashi is currently hospitalized in a coma.
465	39	"The Shadow of the Black Organization - Shining Star of Pearl"; Transliteration: "Kuro no Soshiki no Kage Shinju no Nagareboshi" (Japanese: 黒の組織の影 真珠の流れ星)	Kobun Shizuno	N/A	February 19, 2007
After a thorough investigation, Conan tranquilizes Kogoro and reveals the culprit to be Kanyo's wheelchair-using husband, Tatsuhito Funemoto. Conan reveals that Tatsuhito had Kanyo look outside by telling her there was a shooting star and shot her. He then falsified a robbery by hiding her pearl necklace by using them as Setsubun beans and having his maid vacuum them. Conan explains that the garbage scheme was so Tatsuhito could receive the vacuum bag later and pawn the pearls. As proof for the murder, Conan reveals that an onion was on the handle of his wheelchair which he got from the kitchen rubber glove; Conan reveals that the fingerprints and gunpowder on the glove will convict him for murder. Tatsuhito confesses and reveals his wife was obsessively spending money sponsoring parties and that she planned to place a second mortgage on the house and divorcing him in order to leave him full of debt.

== Notes ==
- ^1 hr. One hour long special episode.
