= Case Closed season 14 =

Season of television series

Case Closed
- Season 14
- The cover of the first DVD compilation for season fourteen of Detective Conan released by Shogakukan
- No. of episodes: 37

Release
- Original network: NNS (ytv)
- Original release: February 28, 2005 – January 16, 2006

Season chronology
- ← Previous; Season 13 Next → Season 15

The fourteenth season of the Case Closed anime was directed by Masato Satō and produced by TMS Entertainment and Yomiuri Telecasting Corporation. The series is based on Gosho Aoyama's Case Closed manga series. In Japan, the series is titled Detective Conan (名探偵コナン, Meitantei Conan) but was changed due to legal issues with the title Detective Conan. The episodes' plot follows Conan Edogawa's daily adventures, including an episode in where the Black Organization attempts to assassinate a political candidate.

The episodes use nine pieces of theme music: four opening themes and five ending themes. The first opening theme is "Start" by Rina Aiuchi until episode 393. The second opening theme is "Hoshi no Kagayaki yo" (星のかがやきよ, lit. "Shining of the Stars") by Zard until episode 414. The third opening theme is "Growing of My Heart" by Mai Kuraki until episode 424. The fourth opening is "Shōdō" (衝動, lit. "Impulse") by B'z for the rest of the season. The first ending theme is "Wasurezaki" (忘れ咲き, lit. "Unforgettable") by Garnet Crow until 397. The second ending theme is June Bride ~Anata shika Mienai~ (ジューンブライド〜あなたしか見えない〜, lit. "June Bride〜You can only see one〜") by U-ka Saegusa in dB until episode 406. The third ending theme is Sekai Tomete (世界 止めて, lit. "World Stops") by Shiori Takei until episode 416. The fourth ending theme is "Thank You for Everything" by Sayuri Iwata until episode 424. The fifth ending theme is "Kanashii Hodo Anata ga Suki" (悲しいほど 貴方が好き, lit. "I miss you so much I'm sad") by Zard.

The season initially ran from February 28, 2005, through January 16, 2006, on Nippon Television Network System in Japan. Episodes 388 to 426 were later collected into ten DVD compilations by Shogakukan. They were released between May 26, 2006, and October 27, 2006, in Japan.

Episode 425 was dubbed by Studio Nano as part of a curated episode list, which was released on Crunchyroll and Netflix on August 21, 2025.

== Episode list ==
No.	No. in season	Title	Directed by	Written by	Original air date
390	1	"Metropolitan Police Detective Love Story 6 (Part 1)"; Transliteration: "Honchou no Keiji Koimonogatari 6 (Zenpen)" (Japanese: 本庁の刑事恋物語6（前編）)	Nana Harada	N/A	February 28, 2005
Yumi overhears that a promotion for Takagi will send him to a case in a far away place where he shall remain there until the case is solved. Apparently the case involves a large number of people in a crime organization, where he is expected to be there for three years. Later the Detective Boys are walking home when they noticed a strange jogger. Takagi, Sato, and Chousuke are placed on the case of a murder. The Detective Boys come across them and identify the jogger as the suspect. When they arrive, the suspect's allibi of video recordings proves he was there the whole time the murder took place, but the Detective Boys are certain he was the jogger. What's more, the allibi is confirmed by Officer Chiba, since it is his roommate.
391	2	"Metropolitan Police Detective Love Story 6 (Part 2)"; Transliteration: "Honchou no Keiji Koimonogatari 6 (Kōhen)" (Japanese: 本庁の刑事恋物語6（後編）)	Minoru Tozawa	N/A	March 7, 2005
Conan discovers that the suspect tricked Chiba's sense of time. He revealed that there was a re-air of the news, and it was dubbed. He also revealed that the culprit cut out parts and fast forwarded parts of the video to manipulate time. He also spun the time two hours behind, and slowly fixed it as the day dragged on. Afterwards, Takagi almost proposes to Sato but Megure reveals to him Chousuke Takagi is the one being sent for the case. They later take the Detective Boys to Karaoke.
392	3	"The Mysterious Height Difference of 20cm" Transliteration: "Nazomeku Shinchousa 20 cm" (Japanese: 謎めく身長差20cm)	Roko Ogiwara	Nao Morishita	March 14, 2005
On a walk with Ran, Conan runs into Takagi who explains that Katsugoro Kitamura, the president of a construction company, is found dead from a stab wound. The suspect, Yuuichi Minamida, is in custody while the police attempt to figure out how the murder was done. The knife angle on the body suggests Kitamura was murdered by someone shorter than him; Minamida is 20 cm taller than Kitamura making it technically impossible. Conan drops subtle hints allowing Takagi to solve the murder. Takagi reveals that Minamida unscrewed the light bulbs in Kitamura's room. During the meeting, Kitamura uses a step ladder to fix the lights but is stabbed by Minamida. As evidence, Takagi reveals that there is a lack of evidence on the light bulbs even though Kitamura changed them recently. Minamida confesses to the crime and reveals that Kitamura had been blackmailing him for the land below Minamida's restaurant. The restaurant was the gift his father gave him after he was shunned by his family for a murder he did not commit.
393	4	"A Kidnapping Case... So It Seems"; Transliteration: "Yuukai...Rashii Jiken" (Japanese: 誘拐...らしい事件)	Masato Sato	Nobuo Ogizawa	March 21, 2005
A motorcyclist crashes outside of Mouri's detective agency. The motorcyclist is dead, but they find a suitcase with 300,000 yen and a note suggesting the money is a ransom drop. From the note they can only determine the last name of the person abducted, but they also find heart medicine and by calling various hospitals they find the family. After speaking with the family and gathering clues they find out that the motorcyclist had an accomplice. The son-in-law of the kidnapped man was constantly being berated by his father-in-law, and recently his wife started to lose faith in him it seems. Conan begins to suspect the son-in-law and they are able to find the man in time to give him the medicine. Conan tranquilizes Kogoro and deduces that the son-in-law was responsible for the kidnapping. He admits to the kidnapping, and sadly it is revealed that neither his father-in-law nor his wife harbored any ill-feelings toward him (he was trying to be strict with him so that he would be able to inherit the family business).
394	5	"Big Adventure in the Eccentric Mansion: The Seal"; Transliteration: "Kibatsu na Yashiki no Daibouken (Fuuinhen)" (Japanese: 奇抜な屋敷の大冒険(封印編))	Roko Ogiwara	N/A	April 18, 2005
Agasa, Haibara, Conan, Ayumi, Mitsuhiko, and Genta go camping. While they're camping they find a lantern in a pond with some writing inside. They show the stone lantern to Conan who determines that it is a code to finding a large diamond. The lantern is also hiding another secret...a dead body at the bottom of the pond. After searching the body they find out that he was a treasure hunter who was straggled to death by another person looking for the treasure. They also find a tear-shaped stone with the kanji "inflammation" written on it and a notebook. The notebook suggests that he was murdered by his partner and that Kaitou Kid is also seeking the treasure. Dr. Agasa goes back to camp to call the police.
395	6	"Big Adventure in the Eccentric Mansion: The Mechanism"; Transliteration: "Kibatsu na Yashiki no Daibouken (Karakurihen)" (Japanese: 奇抜な屋敷の大冒険(絡繰編))	Minoru Tozawa	N/A	April 25, 2005
Conan, Haibara, and the kids decide to enter the house which belonged to Kichiemon a puppet maker and architect of the riddle. The house is filled with all kinds of booby-traps which Genta almost falls victim too until another treasure hunter saves him from a pit of spikes. As they continue to search the house they meet another treasure hunter, and end up falling down a trap door into the basement. Luckily they are saved by Conan's supersized soccerball. In the basement they find Kichiemon's grave, a bunch of human remains, and an old lady. The first treasure hunter reveals grudgingly that he found the mirror artifact and Conan reveals the tear-shaped stone. They continue looking for the sword, which is the last piece of the puzzle.
396	7	"Big Adventure in the Eccentric Mansion: The Resolution"; Transliteration: "Kibatsu na Yashiki no Daibouken (Kaiketsuhen)" (Japanese: 奇抜な屋敷の大冒険（解決編）)	Roko Ogiwara	N/A	May 2, 2005
The old lady nearly gets chopped up by four swinging blades when she steps on a trap. Conan realizes that if one stands in the right spot the blades will not harm you and that one of the blades actually has a handle allowing him to swing over towards the sword. The sword contains the last clue, which leads everyone back to the pond. Mitsuhiko accidentally discovers that the diamond is at the bottom of the pond. The first treasure hunter dives in after it while the second pulls a gun planning to kill everyone and take the diamond for herself. Conan is able to tranquilizer her, but when the treasure hunter comes back up with the diamond the spring starts to pour into the pond causing a massive flood. The only way to stop the flood is to put the diamond back. The old lady turns out to be Kaitou Kid who knew all along that the diamond was unable to be stolen, and Conan allows him to escape on his hang-glider.
397	8	"Hot, Bitter, Sweet Soup"; Transliteration: "Karaku Nigaku Amai Shiru" (Japanese: 辛く苦く甘い汁)	Nana Harada	Takeo Ohno	May 9, 2005
A woman, Fumie Ozawa, is found dead in her bathroom around 9 am, having appeared to have committed suicide by hanging herself with a thin wire, by her friend Etsuko Aikawa who claims it was murder. The medical examiner puts the time of death between 6 and 8 pm the previous night. Mouri investigates the scene and sees that she schedules a dentist appointment for the same day of her "suicide". Conan finds a powdered substance, sneaks away with a sample, and when asking a store clerk of it, she says it is katakuri starch- a thickner with sugar properties. When looking into Ozawa's company financials, the police find a 30 million yen deficit that they believed she embezzled and her superior/boyfriend, Ryota Shimizu, who was off the same day she died and received an e-mail from Ozawa at 5:45 pm yesterday, may have a connection. Aikawa claims she treated Fumie like a surrogate daughter all her life and would do nothing to harm her when the police question her as a suspect. Later, Aikawa's alibi is in question when a delivery man saw her earlier than she stated. She states that she found the body earlier than she did, but after she left money for Ozawa before finding her, and was going to notify the police afterwards. As the case is thought to be over, the authorities believing Aikawa to be the killer trying to frame Shimizu, Conan tranquilizes Kogorou as they are leaving then explains that Shimizu is the true culprit. Shimizu used ice which melted over the course of the day to slowly hang Fumie Ozawa, and that he used her cell phone on vibrate when he called it to send an e-mail to give him an alibi by shaking off a book self above to land on the mouse. His hair is also found on the wire used to kill her. He confesses, revealing that he did it because he didn't want to see her remain in jail for the rest of her life for her embezzling.
398	9	"The Strange Family's Request (Part 1)"; Transliteration: "Kimyou na Ikka no Irai (Zenpen)" (Japanese: 奇妙な一家の依頼（前編）)	Minoru Tozawa	N/A	May 16, 2005
Ran sends a message to Shinichi's phone only to find Conan's phone has also received the message causing her to suspect Conan of being Shinichi. A woman named Tomoko Kiriya hires Kogoro to search for her cellphone which contains messages of her affair. She attempted to call her phone and someone always hangs it up. She suspects that her either her father-in-law, brother-in-law, or husband has her phone. After questioning the three, Tomoko calls her phone and finds it and sends Kogoro away. While heading home, Conan learns from the news that Tomoko was found dead in her car after being stabbed and bludgeoned. Kogoro, Ran, and Conan return to the Kiriya home with the police to investigate. The three have established alibis: The father was heard behind the shōji, the brother's shadow was seen by the shōji, and the husband's pipe smoking was smelt. After ruling out the man having an affair with Tomoko, the police's investigation leads them to believe the case is somehow related to a murder twelve years ago which was done by Eisuke Kiriya, the third family son who disappeared after being suspected for the murder of his fiancée.
399	10	"The Strange Family's Request (Part 2)"; Transliteration: "Kimyou na Ikka no Irai (Kōhen)" (Japanese: 奇妙な一家の依頼（後編）)	Roko Ogiwara	N/A	May 23, 2005
Conan reveals that the person who has the cellphone is obviously inexperienced with one. Since cellphones weren't popularized until a decade ago, the one who had the phone is Eisuke. Conan reveals that one of the three is hiding Eisuke. The police rule out the father and husband leaving Shigehide Kiriya, the brother-in-law, as their suspect. Conan points to the fact that Shigehide's books were old fashion and lacked cellphones raising the possibility that Eisuke is the one writing the novels for him. Eisuke reveals himself and confesses to stabbing his fiancée twelve years ago after learning of her affair. The police reveal that the fiancée was also bludgeoned to death, meaning Shigehide finished her off. After finding Tomoko's phone, they have the evidence to the murder. Shigehide confesses and reveals that twelve years ago, he was having an affair with Eisuke's fiancée and bludgeoned her when she told him she only intended to marry one of them for the money. As for Tomoko, she discovered Eisuke when she found her phone and used that information to blackmail Shigehide for murder and thus motivated his murder. Later that night, Ran grabs a hold of Conan's phone when he drops it in the car and checks to see the message she sent to Shinichi is there.
400	11	"Ran's Suspicions"; Transliteration: "Giwaku wo Motta Ran" (Japanese: 疑惑を持った蘭)	Yasuichiro Yamamoto	Kazunari Kochi	May 30, 2005
Ran turns on Conan's cellphone only to find out there is a four digit lock. She reminisces about the time Shinichi was forming words through the Hiragana and numbers found on the license plates. Shinichi witnesses a car with an illegal license plate as cars are not allowed to use the Hiragana "shi" or "he" and reports this to the police. The police capture the criminals before they robbed a bank. Back in the present time, Ran uses the word Sherlock which are the numbers 4869 and unlocks Conan's phone. Ran suspects Conan deleted her messages and resents the mail only to receive a phone call from an irritated Shinichi. Conan appears and asks for his phone and returns to his room where it is revealed that he used a prerecorded message to call Ran in the event of her getting close to finding his secret. Conan then gives Ran his phone number and accepts the dangers that would come by doing so.
401	12	"A Jewel Thief Caught Red-Handed (Part 1)"; Transliteration: "Houseki Goutou Genkouhan (Zenpen)" (Japanese: 宝石強盗現行犯（前編）)	Roko Ogiwara	N/A	June 6, 2005
The Detective Boys meet Takagi in a jewelry store, and soon after, they witness the store being robbed. They chase him to a nearby roof, which he jumps off of, killing himself. Conan notices several suspicious things about the incident, leading the police to believe that it wasn't as simple of a case as it first appeared to be, including the fact that the van he fell onto was being used by the culprit's former boss. At the end, Conan realizes that it was a murder, and who did it.
402	13	"A Jewel Thief Caught Red-Handed (Part 2)"; Transliteration: "Houseki Goutou Genkouhan (Kōhen)" (Japanese: 宝石強盗現行犯（後編）)	Yukina Hiiro	N/A	June 13, 2005
The Detective Boys and Conan solve the case and show the police that they were wrong about almost everything that happened.
403	14	"The Mysterious Angel's Mansion (Part 1)"; Transliteration: "Fushigi na Tenshi no Yakata (Zenpen)" (Japanese: 不思議な天使の館（前編）)	Minoru Tozawa	Nao Morishita	June 20, 2005
The Detective Boys and Conan meet Yuriko an orphaned girl. She is a potential heiress to her great-grandfather's fortune, but she must first solve a riddle. Tokei, the man's secretary, instructs her to seek out the Detective Boys' help, and they all gather at the mansion. At 9:00 pm he announces the riddles: "When the bull loses its horns, and his tail becomes his head. The angel will come down and play the horn. That melody is my treasure." They have exactly 24 hours in which to solve the riddle. Conan solves the first part of the riddle and finds a black stone, but they fall into a trap which leaves them in a labyrinth.
404	15	"The Mysterious Angel's Mansion (Part 2)"; Transliteration: "Fushigi na Tenshi no Yakata (Kōhen)" (Japanese: 不思議な天使の館（後編）)	Nana Harada	Nao Morishita	June 27, 2005
The Detective Boys parallel the legend of the Minotaur and Theseus by using the yarn from their clothes to navigate the labyrinth. Eventually they find their way out with 3 hours left to solve the riddle. Conan has a revelation and uses the spotlight and the black stone to cast a shadow which leads to the treasure. Tokei and the Detective Boys dig up the treasure and find a mountain of gold and a picture of the old man and his granddaughter. It is then revealed that Tokei, who served the old man, who was apparently involved with the yakuza, is Yuriko's father.
405	16	"The Man Who Called for an Ambulance"; Transliteration: "Kyuukyuusha wo Yobi ni Itta Otoko" (Japanese: 救急車を呼びに行った男)	Roko Ogiwara	Nobuo Ogizawa	July 4, 2005
One day a man was jogging and finds a dead body. He calls the Ambulance but worried about the man's life, decides to run to the nearest bus station. Because of his actions he is considered the main suspect. Takagi comes to the case and with Conan's help, solves the case. He proves the man's innocence and captures the culprit. It turns out the Manager's dying message was for the culprit saying he should always try and smile.
406	17	"Conan and Heiji's Reasoning Magic: The Trick"; Transliteration: "Konan Heiji no Suiri Majikku (Shikakehen)" (Japanese: コナン·平次の推理マジック（仕掛編）)	Nana Harada	N/A	July 11, 2005
Conan, Heiji, Ran, and Kazuha are at Dogo Hoshikawa's magic show. Things get serious when Dogo enters a cube of water with chains and something goes wrong, prompting Ran and Kazuha to rush on stage to break it open. Dogo escapes unscathed, revealing it was part of the trick. As an award for their concern, Ran and Kazuha are invited to come to a party with Dogo, where they meet Tenko Himemiya, Riki Handa, and Mari Masakage, wife of legendary magician Mr. Masakage. A number a notable magicians are mentioned, and Dogo, Riki, and Tenko were once pupils of Mr. Masakage before he disappeared 10 years ago. All that remains of him are his magic notes and magazines which are kept in an archive room down a very creepy narrow hallway. Tenko announces her next magic trick called the "Burning of the Witch", where is she tied to a cross, burned, then reappears from the ashes. She leaves to freshen up for dinner but does not return. Dogo, Kazuha, and Ran go to find her. They use the creepy hallway and a blackout occurs. When the lights are restored, they find Tenko's bloody corpse, seemingly appearing out of nowhere, at end of the hallway.
407	18	"Conan and Heiji's Reasoning Magic: The Mansion"; Transliteration: "Konan Heiji no Suiri Majikku (Yakatahen)" (Japanese: コナン·平次の推理マジック（館編）)	Minoru Tozawa	N/A	July 18, 2005
Tenko's brutal murder is investigated. According to Dogo, Kazuha, and Ran, her corpse appeared in front of them after the blackout. Conan and Heiji investigate into the matter and find the archive room destroyed. Based on the evidence presented in front of them, the killer broke inside the house searching for Mr. Masakage's secret magic trick information in the archive room but was caught by Tenko and killed her. A footprint and broken twigs is found outside, showing the killer's escape route. None of the suspects had a motive to kill Tenko. Heiji tells Conan that he feels angry seeing Kazuha with another man for some reason with Conan calling Heiji child like afterwards. In the past, Mr. Masakage caught a thief trying to steal his trick information but let the individual go; he told his wife but did not disclose their name. When Kazuha states that the shadow of the vase was the only thing that changed when the lights were restored, Conan and Heiji now realize how the murder was executed.
408	19	"Conan and Heiji's Reasoning Magic: The Resolution"; Transliteration: "Konan Heiji no Suiri Majikku (Kaiketsuhen)" (Japanese: コナン·平次の推理マジック（解決編）)	Roko Ogiwara	N/A	August 1, 2005
Conan recreates the trick used by the killer, disappearing and reappearing in front of everyone in the creepy long hallway. It is revealed that Tenko's corpse was there the entire time, and Heiji shows that it involves how the house is built. They reveal the hallway has mirrors on the doors with identical rooms on the side, topped off with a projector screen to cause an illusion. Dogo is revealed to be the murderer, evidenced by his under clothes stained with Tenko's blood. Dogo confesses that Tenko stole Mr. Masakage's trick, her new trick, "Return of the Witch", is a rip-off of their mentor's "Return of the Devil." Tenko's blatant disrespect and sense of arrogance drove Dogo to murder her, and Mari knew Dogo had a hand to play in Tenko's murder but didn't say anything. Dogo is arrested for murder.
409	20	"The Simultaneous Stage Advance and Kidnapping (Part 1)"; Transliteration: "Douji Shinkou Butai to Yuukai (Zenpen)" (Japanese: 同時進行舞台と誘拐（前編）)	Minoru Tozawa	Junichi Miyashita	August 8, 2005
Tamanosuke and his troupe are preparing a show but Renge Kataoka's father, the actress, forbids his daughter to attend the show. Tamanosuke is in trouble and asks Ran to replace the girl until it was able to convince her father to let her play. After a few days she has not made more alive and the boy decides to go to his house to convince her father to her acting. Once there, he discovers that the girl was abducted.
410	21	"The Simultaneous Stage Advance and Kidnapping (Part 2)"; Transliteration: "Douji Shinkou Butai to Yuukai (Kōhen)" (Japanese: 同時進行舞台と誘拐（後編）)	Nana Harada	Junichi Miyashita	August 15, 2005
The time of show is getting closer, Tamanosuke decides to play the show without Renge Kataoka, the actress, by replacing Ran as the girl before the end of the show. Thus Conan manages to find out who has kidnapped the girl and free just in time to enable it to play its role in the show.
411	22	"The Shinto Shrine Torii's Surprising Code (Part 1)"; Transliteration: "Jinja Torii Bikkuri Angou (Zenpen)" (Japanese: 神社鳥居ビックリ暗号（前編）)	Minoru Tozawa	N/A	August 22, 2005
The detective boys are hiking on a trip to find stag beetles on a mountain forest. There Conan receives a photo of Ran in a swimsuit from Sonoko. Later Conan receives a phone call from Ran and Sonoko who tells "Shinichi" that a burglar tried to steal Sonoko's bag. Since it relates to a murder, Conan investigates the picture sent by Sonoko to learn about the dying message. While at it, he helps the Detective Boys solve one of Agasa's code.
412	23	"The Shinto Shrine Torii's Surprising Code (Part 2)"; Transliteration: "Jinja Torii Bikkuri Angou (Kōhen)" (Japanese: 神社鳥居ビックリ暗号（後編）)	Yasuhiro Minami	N/A	August 29, 2005
Later Conan solves both codes and finds out that Ran and Sonoko are riding with the murderer. The culprit tries to kill them but Ran knocks him out with her Karate. Later, Conan's picture of Ran is deleted by Haibara and the Detective Boys say that they asked Haibara to do it and that he should not have access to those kind of materials.
413	24	"The Half Completed Crime Mystery"; Transliteration: "Kanzen Hanbun Hanzai no Nazo" (Japanese: 完全半分犯罪の謎)	Minoru Tozawa	Nobuo Ogizawa	September 5, 2005
Kogoro is invited by TV producer Ryoko Inoue to share some of his case stories. He meets scriptwriters Joji Yagami, Morio Kouda, and Akira Sakuma. During negotiations, Joji drops dead from poison laced in his coffee. After a thorough background check, Morio becomes the main suspect due to his hatred and numerous times to get him fired. Joji had been bullying Morio which pushes his motive further. Once the facts have been analyzed, Conan tranquilizes Kogoro and reveals that Morio did murder Joji. There was no method involved, because Morio indiscriminately chose at random and didn't care which scriptwriter drank the poison. His motive wasn't based on revenge for his bullying but because he wanted a better chance for fame. As Morio is arrested, Conan is upset how Morio killed someone to become prominent as he enjoyed the episodes he wrote.
414	25	"The Detective Boys' Bluebird Chase"; Transliteration: "AoiTori wo Ou Tanteidan" (Japanese: 青い鳥を追う探偵団)	Nana Harada	Kazunari Kochi	September 12, 2005
Conan and the Detective Boys are invited by their classmate Yuka Konno to come to her house. At her house, they meet Shinya Sakaguchi, a man who is in a relationship with Yuka's mother and was told to take care of Yuka. Yuka shows the Detective Boys her pet budgerigar named Chichi. She explains that a male budgerigar's cere is blue while a female's is brown, yet Chichi's became brown; Yuka also notes Chichi looks smaller than usual. Haibara reveals that Sakaguchi bought a substitute pet for Yuka since Chichi is missing. The next day, Ayumi, Genta, and Mitsuhiko question Sakaguichi on Chichi's whereabouts. Sakaguchi explains that he found Chichi dead in its cage, so he replaced the bird as not to sadden Yuka about its death. The three become suspicious of Sakaguichi and come to the conclusion he was testing an evaporating poison on the bird. As support to their idea, Mitsuhiko points out that explains why they found the all doors and windows open in that room; It was so the poison would be aired out. They come to the conclusion Sakaguichi put the poison in the soy sauce and rush to Yuka's house to tell her. They find Conan and Sakaguichi there and Conan explains what truly happened. He explained that Sakaguichi's story was true, since budgerigar become more lively and have their cere's turn brown when they are sick. He explains that the windows and doors were open to prevent them from noticing Sakaguichi's body odor due to the fact he had to work three days straight on an experiment and had not showered. Sakaguichi apologizes to Yuka for not telling her about Chichi's death and gives her a male budgerigar.
415	26	"The Evil Spirit Appears on An Unlucky Day: The Case"; Transliteration: "Butsumetsu ni Deru Akuryou (Jikenhen)" (Japanese: 仏滅に出る悪霊（事件編）)	Minoru Tozawa	N/A	October 10, 2005
A man is being haunted by a ghost, since exorcisms did not work they want Kogorou to solve the case. The clue is a card that says the fifth ghost will kill them unless they repent their sins. Since the time that card was sent, the master installed a door that needs a pin code and fingerprint scan to access the top floor. The master, lady, and the installer of the door are friends who are hiding a secret about the sin. All the accidents happen on Butsumetsu day, the day Buddha dies and the unluckiest day on Earth. On that day the installer was found hanged on the balcony of the third floor. The master was not home so the door could not have been opened.
416	27	"The Evil Spirit Appears on An Unlucky Day: The Suspicion"; Transliteration: "Butsumetsu ni Deru Akuryou (Giwakuhen)" (Japanese: 仏滅に出る悪霊（疑惑編）)	Daiki Nishimura	N/A	October 17, 2005
Afterwards, the master is found dead from a heart attack. Conan realizes he must've seen something that was impossible causing him that much of a fright.
417	28	"The Evil Spirit Appears on An Unlucky Day: The Solution"; Transliteration: "Butsumetsu ni Deru Akuryou (Kaiketsuhen)" (Japanese: 仏滅に出る悪霊（解決編）)	Roko Ogiwara	N/A	October 24, 2005
They decide to investigate the four workers of the mansion along with the accident that took place thirteen years ago. Conan realizes that a twin who was supposed to be long dead was involved, and that was what scared the manager. It was revealed that on the wristwatch of the dying victim, was the location of where the boat accident happened.
418	29	"Home of Beika's Grenier"; Transliteration: "Beikachō Gurunie no Ie" (Japanese: 米花町グルニエの家)	Nana Harada	Kazunari Kochi	October 31, 2005
A small three-story house is put up for rent in the neighbourhood and the Detective Boys decide to pass by it on the way home from school. Haibara tricks the real estate agent into giving them a tour of the inside and Conan notices that he could see Mouri's detective agency from the third floor window. The next day, they discover the house has been sold to an old couple and Conan finds them suspicious. He follows the old man to Chinatown and into an antique shop. The old man is talking with an old Chinese man; Conan is discovered and flees from the scene. Later that day, Conan notices that the house has a camera directed towards the Mouri agency and deduces the old couples are people using a disguise. Conan takes a nap upon coming home and a man in black enters with a gun. The old woman rushes to the agency who Conan greets as his mother. The man in black is Agasa in disguise and was used to lure his mother there. Conan reveals that he became suspicious when his father, disguised as the old man, pushed himself up with his hand to stand; An old man would only do that during seclusion to give other people the sense of his health. Vivian reveals that she was curious about Conan's daily life and that she wanted more pictures of a young Shinichi.
419	30	"Sword of the Eight-Headed Serpent (Part 1)"; Transliteration: "Yamata Oorochi no Ken (Zenpen)" (Japanese: 八岐大蛇の剣（前編）)	Minoru Tozawa	Nobuo Ogizawa	November 7, 2005
Conan, Ran, and Kogorou go to the mythical village of Izumo. there they meet Eiko Ezumi, an employee at the Grand Shrine, and learn that she is to marry a rotten businessman, Kouji Wanibuchi - founder and president of his own company. Later they meet her childhood friend, Ryousuke Fukuma and it comes to a rocky start when Kogorou yells at him. The next day, Eiko's fiancee is found dead with his Sword of the Eight-Headed Snake he was carrying goes missing. The police have 4 suspects, 2 of whom are Eiko and Ryousuke, and Takehiko Fujie and Kazuya Ishitobi. Eiko's and Ryousuke's alibis don't set right with Conan who takes Ran to investigate the alibis.
420	31	"Sword of the Eight-Headed Serpent (Part 2)"; Transliteration: "Yamata Oorochi no Ken (Kōhen)" (Japanese: 八岐大蛇の剣（後編）)	Roko Ogiwara	Nobuo Ogizawa	November 14, 2005
Conan proves that Eiko and Ryou's alibis were to protect the other. Ryou finds Eikos pendant at the crime scene and thinks it was her and Eiko thought it was Ryou from his alibi that he was where she really was, the train station, but she didn't see him. Then it turns out that Ishitobi and Fujie went to Eiko's home to convince Wanibuchi to spare their businesses. Eiko realizes that her pendant vanished that same night. Ishitobi's alibi checks out when the police discover that he is charged with a D.U.I - Drinking Under the Influence. At the temple registry, Conan notices something that helps him figure who the culprit is. Conan tricks Fujie and Kogorou, by impersonating their voices to the other, to meet in front of Hinomisaki tower where Conan tranqs Kogorou and solves the case. Conan (as Kogorou) reveals that from Fujie's testimony that Wanibuchi was a snake, was a correlation to the myth of the Eight-Headed Serpent. He used Eiko to cover his tracks with her pendant, and arranged Wanibuchi & Eiko to meet at the cave around 1:00 and 1:30. His trick to cover the time difference was that he went to the castle twice. He falsified his registry time by putting an added time slot, replaced the pen with an erasable, and placed his name after the murder. To prove this all, Fujie put "Narisei City, Tokyo" as an address for a false name, and it turned out that Narisei isn't a part of Tokyo anymore and confesses. Afterwards, Kogorou tries to get his coin stuck in the Izumo Knot to "bring true his wish", only to make all the coins in the knot to fall on him.
421	32	"Gingko-Colored First Love (Part 1)"; Transliteration: "Ichou Iro no Hatsukoi (Zenpen)" (Japanese: イチョウ色の初恋（前編）)	Masato Sato	N/A	November 21, 2005
The Detective Boys are at Agasa's house when they happen to find a letter from Agasa's first love. Apparently they are supposed to meet every decade but was unable to because Agasa could not solve the code from the letter. The Detective Boys set out to solve it and find the "memorable place" using the hint given in the letter. The clues lead them to the zoo where Agasa sees a brown hair women.
422	33	"Gingko-Colored First Love (Part 2)"; Transliteration: "Ichou Iro no Hatsukoi (Kōhen)" (Japanese: イチョウ色の初恋（後編）)	Masato Sato	N/A	November 28, 2005
The woman turns out to be another classmate, previously a male but now a female. After Conan examines the hint again, he realizes that the sounds were animal noises pronounced by the English. After finding her, she leaves pretending not to know Agasa, believing the Detective Boys were his grandchildren and that she was intruding his happy family. Agasa reveals he knows it is her as she drives away.
423	34	"The Detective Boys and the Four Caterpillar Brothers"; Transliteration: "Tantei-dan to Aomushi Yon-kyoudai" (Japanese: 探偵団と青虫4兄弟)	Nana Harada	Kazunari Kochi	December 5, 2005
Ayumi and other young detectives saw an olive tree on which lives a family of caterpillars. In the same area has been committed murder and a boy, despite having seen the face of the murderer, makes no witness to the police. Conan, talking with the boy, unable to understand why the boy do not want to talk with authorities.
424	35	"The Photo Mail from the Clown"; Transliteration: "Piero kara no Shashin Meeru" (Japanese: ピエロからの写真メール)	Roko Ogiwara	Takeo Ohno	December 19, 2005
Mouri, and Conan are checking out costumes for Mouri's one day of being a chief firemen. Later they meet people attending a costume party. While walking home, they find a police car in front of the house and meet the people from the costume shop earlier, realizing the host has been murdered. Conan realizes that the culprit must've interfered with the Rigor Mortis and finds the evidence to convict the culprit. The culprit reveals that the host was his controlling girlfriend.
425	36	"Black Impact! The Moment the Organization Reaches Out!^{2.5 hrs.}" Transliteration: "Burakku Inpakuto! Soshiki no Te ga Todoku Shunkan" (Japanese: ブラックインパクト! 組織の手が届く瞬間)	Masato Sato	Kazunari Kochi	January 9, 2006
Kogoro is asked to help News Reporter Rena Mizunashi who is experiencing persistent Knock, Knock, Ginger every Saturday for two months. Conan places a transmitter device outside the door and investigates. On Saturday, Conan reveals that the prankster is a young boy who was using the door bell to wake up Rena for her Saturday morning news report; Two months ago, Rena was moved to Sundays and the boy presumed she overslept. The boy reveals that Rena reminds him of his mother and Rena tells him he must be strong for his mother who recently died and to never see her again. While heading home, Conan forgets his device and returns to Rena's apartment to retrieve it. However the device stuck to Rena's shoe. Conan overhears Rena's conversation and realizes she is talking to Gin. Conan overhears that the Black Organization plan to assassinate a man named Yasuteru Domon, a candidate for Japan's Shuugi-In. Conan, with the help of Jodie Starling, manages to avert the assassination by setting off the sprinklers and thus forces the sniper to abandon their mission. While the Black Organization chases after Domon's car, the FBI manages to intercept Rena's vehicle and capture her. Meanwhile, Gin finds the transmitter on Rena's shoes and concludes that it belongs to Kogoro. As the Black Organization members, Korn and Chianti prepare to fire at Kogoro, they are interrupted by Shuichi Akai's sniper shots. The Organization flees and Gin concludes that it was a set-up by the FBI. Later that day, Conan tells Haibara that with Rena, they will have a lead on the Black Organization.
426	37	"Love Letter to Ran"; Transliteration: "Ran he no Rabu Retaa" (Japanese: 蘭へのラブレター)	Minoru Tozawa	Kazunari Kochi	January 16, 2006
Ran receives an anonymous "love" letter that has Conan worried. Ran isn't able to decide if she should go meet this person or not. Then Ran, Conan and Sonoko help a lady which then leads to saving a man's life. The man had once sent a love letter to this lady and thanked her for coming that day even though she had rejected him. From this Ran decides to go meet the person who sent the letter.

== Notes ==
- ^2.5 hrs. Two and a half hour long special episode.
