= Case Closed season 16 =

Season of television series

Case Closed
- Season 16
- The cover of the first DVD compilation for season sixteen of Detective Conan released by Shogakukan
- No. of episodes: 25

Release
- Original network: NNS (ytv)
- Original release: February 26 – December 3, 2007

Season chronology
- ← Previous; Season 15 Next → Season 17

The sixteenth season of the Case Closed anime was directed by Masato Satō and produced by TMS Entertainment and Yomiuri Telecasting Corporation. The series is based on Gosho Aoyama's Case Closed manga series. In Japan, the series is titled Detective Conan (名探偵コナン, Meitantei Conan) but was changed due to legal issues with the title Detective Conan. The episodes' plot follows Conan Edogawa's daily adventures.

The episodes use six pieces of theme music: three opening themes and three ending themes. The first opening theme is "Kumo ni Notte" (雲に乗って, lit. "Ride on a Cloud") by U-ka Saegusa in dB until episode 474. The second opening theme is "Namida no Yesterday" (涙のイエスタデー, lit. "Tearful Yesterday") by Garnet Crow until episode 486. The third opening theme is "Glorious Mind" (グロリアス マインド, "Gurorisu Maindo") by Zard for the rest of the season. The first ending theme is "Shiroi Yuki" (白い雪, lit. "White Snow") by Mai Kuraki until episode 470. The second ending theme is "I still believe ~Tameiki~" (I still believe 〜ため息〜, lit. "I still believe 〜Sigh〜") by Yumi Shizukusa until episode 486. The third ending theme is "Sekai wa mawaru to iu keredo" (世界はまわると言うけれど, lit. "They Say the World Spins Around") by Garnet Crow for the rest of the season.

The season initially ran from February 26, 2007, through December 3, 2007, on Nippon Television Network System in Japan. Episodes 466 to 490 were later collected into eight DVD compilations by Shogakukan. They were released between January 25, 2008, and August 22, 2008, in Japan.

== Episode list ==
No.	No. in season	Title	Directed by	Written by	Original air date
466	1	"The Unsmashable Snowman (Part 1)"; Transliteration: "Warenai Yukidaruma (Zenpen)" (Japanese: 割れない雪だるま（前編）)	Minoru Tozawa	N/A	February 26, 2007
The Detective Boys are at a small ski resort and meet up with four graduate students who are building a snowman for an art project. Later that evening, Sakuko Kokura, one of the graduate students, become lost in the blizzard and the two groups begin their search for her. Conan finds the Kokura dead at the bottom of a cliff in a lake. The police declares that Kokura's death was a snowboarding accident. Conan notices that the body is missing a hat, goggles, and gloves and believes that she was murdered and one of the graduate students is the culprit.
467	2	"The Unsmashable Snowman (Part 2)"; Transliteration: "Warenai Yukidaruma (Kōhen)" (Japanese: 割れない雪だるま（後編）)	Nobuharu Kamanaka	N/A	March 5, 2007
Genta trips and falls into the snow and comments how it was hard and salty. Conan realizes how the murder was done and gathers the suspects along with inspector Misao Yamamura. Conan tranquilizes Yamamura and impersonates him using his voice changing bow tie to reveal that the murderer is the graduate student Kazuya Itabashi. Conan reveals that during the snow storm, Kazuya used salt to harden the snowman he was working on. He then called Sakuko to his room where he drowned him in his sink which contained the water from the lake. Afterwards, he attached Sakuko's snow shoes on and placed her in the body of the hardened snowman and rolled her into the lake. He then used the Detective Boy's snowman to rebuild a new body for the snowman. As evidence, Conan reveals that the Junior Detective League's snowman had their detective badges in their snowman which is now found in Kazuya's snowman. He also reveals that the forensic team should find traces of lake water or Sakuko's DNA in Kazuya's sink. Kazuya confesses to the crime revealing that the reason being was that Sakuko had a romantic obsession for Tanji Kiyama, who was ironically infatuated with Asaka Onoue. In a jealous effort to force Kiyama to forget about Onoue, Sakuko tricked the latter into going snowboarding. Thanks to Onoue's inexperience, she broke her leg which Sakuko had suspected would happen. Kazuya learned this from a drunken Sakuko, leading him out of rage to kill her both to punish her actions and prevent Kiyama from "dirtying his hands" with the issue.
468	3	"The Mysterious Case Near the Pond"; Transliteration: "Ike no Hotori no Kaijiken" (Japanese: 池のほとりの怪事件)	Masato Sato	Nobuo Ogizawa	March 12, 2007
The Junior Detective League head to a pond to witness animal control officers attempting to capture an alligator snapping turtle that is loose in the wild. A man named Jiro Nihonmatsu claims that it is his turtle; however, his claim is inconsistent, as the turtle already belonged to someone else. When an animal control officer finds four turtles, Nihonmatsu offers to take all of them and makes some unusual statements about turtles, causing Conan to become suspicious of him. After asking a vet to X-ray the turtles, they find a key to a storage locker where the money from a recent burglary is found. Conan reveals that after the burglary, Nihonmatsu hid the money in the locker and went to the pond to burn his mask and gloves that were used during the robbery; while doing so, one of the turtles swallowed the key to the locker. Nihonmatsu is later arrested by the authorities.
469	4	"Kaitou Kid and the Four Masterpieces (Part 1)"; Transliteration: "Kaitō Kiddo to yon Meiga (Zenpen)" (Japanese: 怪盗キッドと4名画（前編）)	Minoru Tozawa	N/A	April 16, 2007
Takeyori Oikawa claims that the Phantom Thief Kid is targeting his painting which is to be unveiled to the world live that day. The painting is a final part of a set of four. He hires Kogoro Mori to protect the painting from Kid. They place the painting in a secluded room with guards at the door and outside the window. When a black out occurs, the painting is stolen and Oikawa's father, who was in the room, is murdered. While the police speculate how the murder was done and whether Kid is the culprit, Oikawa receives a letter from Kid which claims he will steal the truth of him. Oikawa disfigures the letter to incriminate Kid for the murder and hands it to Conan. Conan who had suspected Oikawa murdered his father is now certain he is the culprit.
470	5	"Kaitou Kid and the Four Masterpieces (Part 2)"; Transliteration: "Kaitō Kiddo to yon Meiga (Kōhen)" (Japanese: 怪盗キッドと4名画（後編）)	Nobuharu Kamanaka	N/A	April 23, 2007
After a thorough investigation, Conan concludes there was never a painting behind the cloth and that it was suspended by a fishing line. Conan reveals that when the police broke into the room, the fishing line, which was held by a rock at the end, was pulled outside the window creating the sense that a person jumped out the window. Oikawa confesses and reveals that he had only planned a set of three but his father scammed the customers into buying the third painting into paying extra so that he would make a fourth painting. Oikawa, unable to paint due to the death of his wife, planned to pretend his painting was stolen to save his career. However, Oikawa thought his father would reveal Oikawa's plan to the world and thus ruining his career as an artist. Conan reveals that Oikawa's father had been practicing on imitating Oikawa's style and had the fourth painting finished and his plan was to give Oikawa his painting. Oikawa then laments over the death of his father due to a misunderstanding. Later on, Takagi is revealed to be Kid and leaves the mansion upon helping with the investigation and having his name cleared.
471	6	"The Uncontrollable Rental Car"; Transliteration: "Rentakā Seigyo Funō" (Japanese: レンタカー制御不能)	Nobuharu Kamanaka	Takeo Ohno	May 7, 2007
Kogoro takes Ran Mori and Conan to an onsen in a rental car after being given a special deal. Kogoro then receives a call from Inspector Megure who reveals that a bomber called the police station to tell them a bomb was placed on Kogoro's car and will detonate when his speed goes below twenty km/h. Kogoro concludes the man who gave him the deal is the bomber. The police, after clearing the roads, manages to rescue Conan from the car. Conan tells Megure his plan on how to save Kogoro and Ran. Conan impersonates Megure's voice and calls Kogoro and reveals the bomber to be Jirou Matsumiya. Conan explains that Jirou's older brother was involved in a case Kogoro worked on three years prior. Jirou's older brother, while fleeing from the police, crashed and died causing him to resent the authorities. The police order a truck specially designed to hold cars and hoists Kogoro's car into it. The truck keeps the car still while allowing the wheels to turn giving them time to refuel the car and disarm the bomb. The police later arrest Jirou and convinces him to forget about revenge.
472	7	"Shinichi Kudo's Childhood Adventure (Part 1)"; Transliteration: "Kudō Shinichi Shōnen no Bōken (Zenpen)" (Japanese: 工藤新一少年の冒険（前編）)	Minoru Tozawa	N/A	May 14, 2007
Conan's class finds a wallet with a message from Ran ten years ago. Conan shares the story of how it got there by explaining the adventure he had in the past. Ten years ago, Kudo and Ran enter the school at night to investigate the rumors of a ghost. They run into a mysterious man who claims to be Shinichi's younger brother who challenges them in a treasure hunt; He then hands them a wallet with a letter containing the message "Quell the anger of Haido" in kanji. "Quell the anger" is pronounced the same as "Drop the anchor", the riddle refers to Haido Port. The pair finds another riddle hidden on a fire hydrant which contains the message "Clear the allegations against Toriya and demolish the liver of Goroukou" in kanji. Conan reveals that clearing the allegation is to prove innocent meaning to prove White (白, Shiro) which refers to the word Castle (城, Shiro) meaning Toriya castle. Goroukou is a reference to Mito Kōmon (水戸黄門). Destroying the liver means destroying the middle, so removing the middle kanji of Mito Kōmon yields Suimon (水門, lit. Flood Gates). The pair finds the next clue near a railroad track by floodgates of Toriya Castle; The message on the riddle is "Erase this Mark. With a raspy voice, endure loneliness."
473	8	"Shinichi Kudo's Childhood Adventure (Part 2)"; Transliteration: "Kudō Shinichi Shōnen no Bōken (Kōhen)" (Japanese: 工藤新一少年の冒険（後編）)	Yasuo Ejima	N/A	May 21, 2007
Shinichi solves the riddle and heads to the school and finds the next riddle on a stop sign. The letter contains a mixture of kanji, and mahjong symbols and when read, pronounces Beika City Hall. Once there, Kudo finds a sign on a pole with the message "S → W". He presumes it means the sunset and assumes his father created the riddle for his entertainment. Back in the present time, Conan realizes what the riddle actually means. Conan writes down the symbols for port, castle, flood gate, post office, middle school, and city hall. It is revealed "S → W" means South to West, so when the symbols are turned 90 degrees, reveals Ox hide in kanji. Conan rips open the leather wallet which reveals a message for Booker Kudo from the Toichi Kuroba
474	9	"The Love of Lawyer Eri Kisaki"; Transliteration: "Kisaki Eri Bengoshi no Koi" (Japanese: 妃英理弁護士の恋)	Noriaki Saito	N/A	June 4, 2007
Eri Kisaki is visited by Ran and Conan who came to remind her it is the anniversary of her first date with Kogoro. Eri leaves to meet someone at a café after a phone call. Shortly after Eri's cat, Goro, knocks down a vase where Ran finds a picture of a man and her mother's wedding ring. They notice the number on the back of the picture matches the number of the caller causing Ran to believe that her mother is having an affair and thus follows her to the café. Once there, Ran hears the man speak with a woman in a baby talk tone. Eri tearfully tells the man she "could not stop the trembling" and the man replies "it is just a dream". As Ran is about to assault the man, Conan reveals the man is a veterinarian. As proof, he reveals the man was talking to the woman's dog in a baby talk tone, not the woman. He also points out that the scratches on the man's arms were from animals he examined. Eri reveals she met with the veterinarian to discuss Goro's somniloquy. After Ran leaves, the veterinarian reveals he thought she was seeking an affair since her clothing were more revealing than usual. Eri reveals that since it was the anniversary of her first date with her husband, she had planned to call him and invite him to dinner while wearing the clothes from their first date but decided to cancel when Ran found out. Elsewhere, Kogoro, wearing his clothes from their first date, falls asleep while waiting for Eri's phone call.
475	10	"Bad Luck Grand Prix"; Transliteration: "Akūn Guran Puri" (Japanese: 悪運グランプリ)	Minoru Tozawa	Nobuo Ogizawa	June 18, 2007
Kogoro takes Conan out to look for a restaurant in the city and witnesses a hit and run resulting in two pedestrians being injured. A witness reveals he saw the car waited for those two before speeding into their direction and Conan concludes it was an attempted murder. The pedestrian Kiyotaka Okonogi is a wealthy man and his nephew, Kazuma Sakaki, is the prime suspect since Sakaki would be the one to inherit Okonogi's fortune. Sakaki's fiancée, Tomomi Ichikura, has an alibi since she sent a text to Sakiki about a bombing incident at a shopping mall which occurred during the time of the attack. The other pedestrian, Shinzaburo Tatamatsu, reveals that the driver was the same culprit who stole his groceries and threatened to kill him; disproving their theory Okonogi was the targeted victim. Conan investigates and discovers the bomb at the mall was moved from the fifth floor to the sixth floor by a shopper, yet Ichikura's text says the bomb was found on the fifth floor and concludes her to be the culprit. After tranquilizing Kogoro, Conan reveals Ichikura knew about Tatamatsu and Okonogi's meetings and set up the murder in order to make Tatamatsu believe he was the one being targeted. Ichikura confesses to the attempted murder and how she wanted Okonogi's fortune.
476	11	"Genta's Certain Kill Shot (Part 1)"; Transliteration: "Genta no Hissatsu Shūto (Zenpen)" (Japanese: 元太の必殺シュート（前編）)	Masahiro Hosoda	N/A	June 25, 2007
Agasa takes the Junior Detective League to a cheesecake bakery. Genta however decides to remain in the underground parking lot and continues to kick a soccer ball against a wall. When Genta hears a strange sound, he misses his kick and subsequently losses balance and falls on his head causing him to lose consciousness. When he awakens, he searches for the soccer ball only to find a foreigner named Heinen Ludger with a severe head injury. The Junior Detective League arrive upon hearing Genta's scream. Ludger points at Genta and says criminal and "El" before losing consciousness. The police arrive and reveal that the culprit was searching for money. Conan reveals that there were only three people in the parking lot during the time the attack occurred.
477	12	"Genta's Certain Kill Shot (Part 2)"; Transliteration: "Genta no Hissatsu Shūto (Kōhen)" (Japanese: 元太の必殺シュート（後編）)	Takashi Sano	N/A	July 2, 2007
The police gather the three suspects together where Conan reveals that the culprit is Kanji Kojima. Conan explains that the criminal is like Genta, meaning a mischievous boy and an elf. Conan reveals that the number eleven in German is pronounced as "Elf", the number that Kojima is wearing on his back. Kojima refuses to confess to the crime, Conan reveals that Kojima claimed he was busy listening to a horse race in the underground parking lot in his car in a desolate location in the parking lot yet he knew Genta was the first one to find Ludger meaning Kojima was at the crime scene. Kojima is then apprehended by the authorities. The next day, Ludger gives Genta a cheesecake as an apology for pointing him out as a criminal.
478	13	"Real 30 Minutes"; Transliteration: "Riaru 30 Minittsu" (Japanese: リアル30ミニッツ)	Nobuharu Kamanaka	Hiroshi Kashiwabara	July 9, 2007
Kogoro, Ran, and Conan are in a mall when a murder occurs on the third floor. The police arrive and seal the mall preventing people from leaving the third floor and preventing public access to the mall. Conan meets a girl who tells him she saw the culprit wearing a black jacket. Conan notices that two gangsters are desperately trying to enter the mall to escort their boss. Conan realizes where the culprit is and reveals to Vi Graythorn that the culprits motive was to prevent the gangsters from entering the mall so he could murder their boss. Conan explains that since the gangsters sent their boss a voicemail, it means their boss is on the third floor and in a place where phones are not allowed. Conan finds a black jacket in a dental clinic and manages to stop the culprit from murderer the boss. The culprit reveals that the boss was the cause of a Hit and Run accident which resulted in the death of his girlfriend. The police then apprehend the culprit and takes the boss in for questioning in the hit and run.
479	14	"Three Days With Heiji Hattori ^{2 hrs.}" Transliteration: "Hattori Heiji to no Mikkakan" (Japanese: 服部平次との三日間)	Nobuharu Kamanaka	Kazunari Kochi	July 16, 2007
Kogoro, Ran, Conan, Heiji Hattori, and Kazuha Toyama are at a festival when a monk asks them to solve a case of a disappearing body at the temple. Shakuren, the head monk, denies the body's existence. After investigating, Conan and Heiji reveal that Shakuren arranged the temples blood stained Tatami mats into the corner of the rooms where the stains are covered by statues. Shakuren reveals that the body was Denkyuu's mother who abandoned him eighteen years ago. He reveals that she performed suicide after being refused to see her son whom she could not even recognize. The next day, Hattori takes Conan with him to participate in a reality television deduction competition between high school detectives Heiji Hattori, Natsuki Koshimizu, Junya Tokitsu, and Saguru Hakuba. While there, Tokitsu is murdered and the detectives realize the television programming was a hoax. After a thorough investigation, the culprit is revealed to be Koshimizu. It is revealed that Koshimizu was searching for the detective whose inadequate investigation led the police to believe her friend was a suspect in a murder prompting her friend's suicide.
480	15	"Yellow Alibi"; Transliteration: "Kiiroi Fuzai Shōmei" (Japanese: 黄色い不在証明)	Minoru Tozawa	Takeo Ohno	July 23, 2007
A hostess named Hiroko Inoue is found dead in her home by Osamu Kitzuka, a colleague of Inoue's to be husband Akira Taokaoka. Kitzuka had a planned meeting with Taokaoka on that day and was the reason he found the body. As Kogoro and Conan investigate, the police conclude it to be a random burglary after Taokaoka's alibi proves he was at Fukushima Prefecture during the time of Inoue's death. Conan is able to find conclusive evidence on Taokaoka and tranquilizes Kogoro to reveal that Inoue was murdered in Fukushima and carried back to her home by Taokaoka dressed as a delivery man. The time of Inoue's real death is shown when a video recording by Inoue is interrupted since Taokaoka accidentally pulled the plug to the VCR. As evidence against Taokaoka, there was coral sand found on Inoue's shoes and in the trunk of his car; a beach in Fukushima has coral sand. Taokaoka confesses and reveals Inoue was forcing him into marriage to repay his debt to her.
481	16	"Mountain Witch's Cutlery (Part 1)"; Transliteration: "Yamanba no Hamono (Zenpen)" (Japanese: 山姥の刃物（前編）)	Jun Takahashi Yusuke Takane (Note: Assistant director)	N/A	July 30, 2007
Agasa takes the Junior Detective League camping, they end up being stranded in the middle of the woods. They decide to ask for lodgings from a house owned by an elderly woman named Iwae Tanaka. At the same time, Akane Ooba and her two hosts, Raito Adachi and Fuuga Kahara, also request for lodging and Tanaka complies. That night, Mitch goes to the restroom but sees something horrifying causing him to run back to his room. Soon after they hear a woman scream and Ooba is later found with her throat slit open outside the house with Raito by her side. The police arrive and investigate all the bladed weapons in the house. Mitch then exclaims that while heading back from the restroom, the knife he saw Tanaka sharpening is missing.
482	17	"Mountain Witch's Cutlery (Part 2)"; Transliteration: "Yamanba no Hamono (Kōhen)" (Japanese: 山姥の刃物（後編）)	Yasuo Ejima	N/A	August 6, 2007
Tanaka dismisses Mitsuhiko's accusation as his imagination and the police continue their investigation. Agasa notes that his hammer is missing and Conan discovers an officer found the hammer in the woods. Conan later finds the rumored knife with the red handle and shows it to the police. None of the weapons reacted to luminol and leaves the officers stumped. As Conan investigates he realizes who the murderer is. Disguising his voice as Agasa, Conan first reveals Kahara is a fake name and that he is actually Tanaka's grandson in disguise, Shouta Tanaka. Since Kahara lived in the house before, he would have used the knife in the shed and is thus, eliminated as a suspect leaving Adachi as the culprit. As evidence, Conan reveals Adachi had his shoes on when he was by Ooba's body while everyone ran bare feet to investigate the screaming. As for the weapon, Conan reveals Adachi used the hammer to break apart an obsidian rock found in the fish tank for the murder; he then concludes the weapon used for the murder should be in the tank. Adachi professes to the murder revealing Ooba tricked his parents into furthering their debt and murdered her in vengeance. Tanaka gives her grandson the knife and her grandson promises to start visiting her again. A month later, Conan spots Shouta working as a chef with the knife his grandmother gave him.
483	18	"The Missing Policeman"; Transliteration: "Kieta Omawarisan" (Japanese: 消えたおまわりさん)	Makoto Nagao	Nobuo Ogizawa	August 13, 2007
Conan and the Junior Detective League run into Amy's neighbor, Yasuyo Akimoto, who is searching for a kind bearded policemen who she ran into multiple times last week. At the police station, they reveal they do not have an officer like that and it was against police regulation to have facial hair. The police assume that officer was linked to a serial burglary, however Akimoto and an elderly couple disagree claiming the officer was too kind and gentle to be the burglar. As the Junior Detective League investigate, they discover the disguised officer is the socially inept owner of a ramen restaurant, Tetsuji Odawara. Conan concludes that Odawara overheard Akimoto was working late last week and worried for her safety, disguises himself as an officer to protect her. The Detective Boys head to the restaurant to find it closed causing Conan to realize Odawara is searching for the serial burglary in order to prove his innocence. Odawara meanwhile realizes the drunk man he helped last week was the burglar when they meet on the streets and gives chase. Conan helps Odawara apprehend the criminal who is then taken into custody. Akimoto who witnessed the apprehension learns that Odawara was the bearded officer. The next day, Odawara silently serves Akimoto ramen at the restaurant.
484	19	"Whereabouts of the Dark Photograph (Part 1)"; Transliteration: "Kuroi Shashin no Yukue (Zenpen)" (Japanese: 黒い写真の行方（前編）)	Masami Furukawa	N/A	August 20, 2007
Hattori tells Conan he found someone that has knowledge on Ethan Hondou's father; However that person is dead but his grandson, Souhei Nishigun, has a photograph of Ethan's father. Conan, Vi, and Agasa travel to Nishigun's apartment and realize that someone has stolen Nishigun's photograph album and deleted the data off his computer. Conan notices that the room contains perspiration from the culprit meaning the robbery occurred very recently. Conan concludes that one of Nishigun's three friends is the culprit as they are the only people with keys to his apartment.
485	20	"Whereabouts of the Dark Photograph (Part 2)"; Transliteration: "Kuroi Shashin no Yukue (Kōhen)" (Japanese: 黒い写真の行方（後編）)	Yasuo Ejima	N/A	August 27, 2007
Nishigun phones all three of his friends to ask what they were doing during the time of the robbery. Conan realizes who the culprit is from the phone calls and reveals the culprit to be his friend Toga, as culprit used a chair to reach the photo album on a high shelf meaning he has a short structure. Since Toga asked Nishigun to keep the door to his verandah to do the laundry in the morning, Conan concludes that he is hiding in the laundry machine on the verndah. Toga apologizes to Nishigun and tells him he had to erase the photograph of a diorama he had plagiarized. Nishigun tells him he knew Toga had plagiarized the tank and had no intention of putting it on his blog. Nishigun then gives Conan the photograph of Ethan's father and tells him Ethan's father worked for something called "The Company".
486	21	"Beckoning Cat from Right to Left"; Transliteration: "Migi Kara Hidari e Manekineko" (Japanese: 右から左へ招き猫)	Masuku Taiga	Takeo Ohno	September 3, 2007
Conan and Vi rescue a kitten from a tree and return him to his owner, Tamotsu Ishigami, the owner of a local café. A woman barges into the café exclaiming she found her boss, Kenzo Kanemaru, dead. Conan, Vi, Kogoro, and Ishigami enter office to confirm the Kanemaru's death and the authorities arrive. Conan notices that someone used the vacuum and threw away its contents and also finds the paw of a broken maneki neko. After finding a notepad with its page ripped, blood on a flip clock at 12:59, and a kitten's bloody par print on the window still, Conan confirms Ishigami to be the culprit and tranquilizes Kogoro. Through Kogoro, Conan reveals that Ishigami killed Kanemaru with a maneki neko he bought and cleaned up the shattered pieces with the vacuum. As evidence, a message on the notepad reveals Ishigami had a planned meeting with the victim at 1:00 and the blood on the flip clock confirms the time of death. Furthermore, his kitten's bloody paw print was found in the room where the murdered occurred. Ishigami professes to the murder, lamenting over the debt he owed to him.
487	22	"Metropolitan Police Detective Love Story 8: The Left Hand's Ring Finger^{1 hr.}" Transliteration: "Honchō no Keiji Koi Monogatari 8 Hidaride no Kusuriyubi" (Japanese: 本庁の刑事恋物語8 左手の薬指)	Minoru Tozawa	N/A	October 15, 2007
Kogoro is invited to attend an interview of the mystery book writer Masataka Moroguichi. The next day, Moroguichi is found dead from consumption of poison. The room was locked and the key was in Moroguichi's palm; The only opening to the room is a small window which can only fit a small child. Simone Miwako and Harry Wilder are called to the scene and believe that the murderer is one of Moroguichi's three interviewers. After a thorough investigation, Conan drops hints allowing Kogoro to solve the murder. Kogoro reveals that the murderer used an unknown object to loop around Moroguichi's hand from the window. After the murderer gave Moroguichi poisoned coffee, he left the room, locked the door, and used the unknown object to send it key back to Moroguichi's hand. The only object fitting this description was the interviewer's Kakuji Dejima cassette tape strings. They reveal that the forensic team should find Moroguichi's blood on the cassette tape. Dejima confesses and reveals that he murdered Moroguichi in vengeance for his friend, Akiba. Akiba was Moroguichi's assistant and was forced to be a test subject for murder ideas which eventually resulted in Akiba's death. Since the police were unable to determine how Akiba was killed, they ruled it as a suicide and Moroguichi was left unpunished. Later that day, Ran asks Simone about the ring on her ring finger. She replies that her friend told her the ring was a charm that would keep bugs away and accepts Wilder's proposal to use his ring as a replacement to the charm.
488	23	"Devil of the TV Station^{1 hr.}" Transliteration: "Terebikyoku no Akuma" (Japanese: テレビ局の悪魔)	Masuku Taiga Makoto Nagao	Kazunari Kochi	October 22, 2007
Yoko Okino takes the Junior Detective League to a TV studio for a tour. When they run into Onizuka Satan, a vocalist for a visual kei rock band. The Junior Detective League decide to search for his room to get his autograph. Meanwhile, a cosmetic-less Satan meets with the director of the TV station, Tenji Urushihara, and murders him. The Junior Detective League find Satan's room and meet Satan in full make up who gives them an autograph. Soon after Urushihara is found by an employee and the police arrive at the station. While the police suspect the murderer to be Satan, Satan retorts that with his make up and costume, it would have been impossible to leave his room without being noticed. Since there is no mirror in Satan's dressing room, it would be impossible to put on his make up and absolves him from the murder. Conan still suspects Satan, and his investigation leads him to find out Satan made a makeshift mirror by using a transparent ruler and black construction paper. To prove this, Conan reveals that the origami cranes were used to camouflage the construction paper but evidence suggested it was not made on that day. Satan confesses and reveals that three years ago a letter from his fan stopped coming. Satan reveals that recently he found out Urushihara sent a message to that fan to commit suicide in the name of Satan in order to have Satan gain more publicity to make more money.
489	24	"Courtroom Confrontation III: Prosecutor as Eyewitness^{1 hr.}" Transliteration: "Hotei no Taiketsu 3 Mokugekisha wa Kensatsukan" (Japanese: 法廷の対決III 目撃者は検察官)	Yasuichiro Yamamoto	Yutaka Kaneko	November 26, 2007
Eri Kisaki is asked to defend Hiroaki Takeuchi who had been accused of Hit and Run incident. However the evidence suggests it was his wife, Mariko Takeuchi, who was committed the crime. Hiroaki calls Reiko Kujo and tells her to meet him and he will tell her the truth. Reiko, accompanied by Mariko, visits Hiroaki and see him fall off his balcony to his death. Believing her questioning motivated his suicide, Reiko quits her job as a prosecutor but learns from Eri the possibility it was a murder made to look like a suicide by Mariko. Conan and Kogoro investigate and confirm that Hiroaki was murdered. During the hearing, Conan tranquilizes Kogoro and, with supporting evidence, reveals Mariko to be the cause of the Hit and Run and that she murdered Hiroaki. The court ends and charges Mariko with the Hit and Run and opens a case involving her homicide.
490	25	"Heiji Hattori vs. Shinichi Kudo: Deduction Battle on the Ski Slope^{1 hr.}" Transliteration: "Hattori Heiji vs Kudō Shinichi Gerende no Suiri Taiketsu" (Japanese: 服部平次 vs 工藤新一ゲレンデの推理対決)	Minoru Tozawa Nobuharu Kamanaka Yoshio Suzuki	N/A	December 3, 2007
Hattori tells Conan that he met a better Detective than Conan during his middle school years and reminisces about the case. At a ski resort, an actor named Shouhei Minowa, is murdered in the same fashion as his stunt performer, Jirou Mizugami, who was murdered four years ago. Minowa is killed while on a ski lift and the gun is placed in his hand suggesting suicide. Minowa's bag is filled with snow to suggest that a Yuki-onna murdered him. Hattori and the unknown Detective, revealed to be Shinichi, investigate and realize how the murder is done. Hattori reveals his deductions to the police while Kudo tells them over the phone. They both reveal that the Minowa, who skied for his fans, was actually his stunt double in disguise, Kousuke Mimata, and that Minowa was hiding in a bag Mimata was carrying. On the ski lift, Mimata kills Minowa and grabs the a similar pre-arranged bag containing snow with the use of his ski pole and places it in his seat before dropping down from the ski lift. As evidence, Heji and Shinichi reveal that Mimata should have Minowa's clothes underneath. Mimata confesses and reveals that Minowa was afraid Mizugami would reveal to the public that Minowa did not perform in skiing scenes in his movies which motivated Minowa to murder Mizugami. Later that day, Hattori and Kudo pass each other, without meeting face to face, and acknowledge each other's deduction abilities.

== Volume DVDs ==
Shogakukan released eight DVD compilations of the seventeenth season between January 25, 2008, and August 22, 2008, in Japan.

Shogakukan/Being (Japan, Region 2 DVD)
Volume	Episodes^{Jp.}	Release date	Ref.
Volume 1	461, 466–468	January 25, 2008	
Volume 2	469–471, 474	February 22, 2008	
Volume 3	472–473, 475, 478	March 28, 2008	
Volume 4	476–477, 480, 483	April 25, 2008	
Volume 5	479	May 23, 2008	
Volume 6	481–482, 484–485	June 27, 2008	
Volume 7	487–488	July 25, 2008	
Volume 8	489–490	August 22, 2008	

== Notes and references ==
Notes

- ^Jp. The episode's numbering as followed in Japan
- ^1 hr. The episodes were aired as a single hour long episode in Japan
- ^2 hrs. The episodes were aired as a single two-hour long episode in Japan
