= Case Closed (TV series) =

Japanese anime television series

- 名探偵コナン; Meitantei Konan
- Genre: Mystery; Thriller
- Based on: Case Closed by Gosho Aoyama
- Directed by: Kenji Kodama (1–118, chief, 119-252); Yasuichiro Yamamoto (119–161, 163–218, 220–332, 667–677, 680–present); Masato Satō (162, 219, 333–504); Kōjin Ochi (505–666, 678–679); Nobuharu Kamanaka (975–present)
- Character designer: Masatomo Sudo
- Music by: Katsuo Ōno
- Voices of: Minami Takayama; Akemi Okamura; Rikiya Koyama; Megumi Hayashibara
- Country of origin: Japan
- Original language: Japanese
- No. of seasons: 33 (Note: As used by the Japanese DVD releases by Shogakukan and B Zone.)
- No. of episodes: 1,221 (list of episodes)

Production
- Studios: TMS/V1 Studio (627–1001); TMS/1st Studio (1002–present)
- Producers: ytv: Michihiko Suwa (1–332); Shuichi Kitada (453–666); Isato Yonekura (667–1008); Takeshi Shioguchi (1009–1129); Goshi Yoshida (1130–present); Tokyo Movie/TMS: Kazuhiko Yagiuchi (1–33); Masahito Yoshioka (1–332); Hiroaki Kobayashi (333–529); Tetsu Kojima (505–520); Takeshi Yamakawa (602–695); Kiyoaki Terashima (750–1032); Masataka Todo (1033–present)
- Production companies: ytv; TMS Entertainment (Note: Credited as Tokyo Movie until 2011.)

Original release
- Networks: NNS (ytv, Nippon TV)
- Release: January 8, 1996 – present

Related
- Case Closed (manga); List of films; List of TV specials and OVAs; Discography; Live action drama episodes; List of video games

Case Closed, also officially known as Detective Conan (Japanese: 名探偵コナン, Hepburn: Meitantei Konan; lit. 'Great Detective Conan'), is a Japanese anime television series based on the manga series Case Closed by Gosho Aoyama. It was localized in English as Case Closed by Funimation due to unspecified legal problems. The anime is produced by TMS Entertainment and Yomiuri Telecasting Corporation with the directors being Kenji Kodama, Yasuichiro Yamamoto, Masato Satō, Kōjin Ochi, and Nobuharu Kamanaka. The series follows the teenage detective Jimmy Kudo, who transforms into a child after being poisoned with APTX 4869 by the Black Organization. Now named Conan Edogawa and living with the Moores, Conan solves murders during his daily life as he awaits the day to defeat the Black Organization.

The anime premiered in January 1996. It resulted in animated feature films, original video animations, video games, audio disc releases and live action episodes. Funimation licensed the anime series for North American broadcast in 2003 under the name Case Closed with the characters given Americanized names. The anime premiered on Adult Swim but was discontinued due to low ratings.

In March 2013, Funimation began streaming their licensed episodes of Case Closed; Crunchyroll simulcast them in 2014. Funimation also localized the first six Case Closed films, while Discotek Media localized the Lupin the 3rd crossover special, its film sequel, and select films and specials, starting with Case Closed Episode One. A localization of select episodes streamed on Tubi in 2023. Another localization of select episodes began streaming on Crunchyroll and Netflix in 2025, using the original Detective Conan title for the first time in English-speaking markets.

== Seasons overview ==
Season	Episodes	Originally released	
Season	Episodes	First released	Last released
1	28	January 8, 1996	August 12, 1996
2	26	August 19, 1996	April 14, 1997
3	28	April 21, 1997	November 24, 1997
4	24	December 1, 1997	June 22, 1998
5	28	June 29, 1998	February 8, 1999
6	28	February 15, 1999	September 27, 1999
7	31	October 11, 1999	June 5, 2000
8	26	June 12, 2000	January 8, 2001
9	35	December 11, 2000	October 22, 2001
10	31	October 29, 2001	July 8, 2002
11	30	July 15, 2002	April 14, 2003
12	38	April 21, 2003	March 1, 2004
13	36	March 8, 2004	February 21, 2005
14	37	February 28, 2005	January 16, 2006
15	39	January 23, 2006	February 19, 2007
16	25	February 26, 2007	December 3, 2007
17	33	January 14, 2008	March 2, 2009
18	42	February 9, 2009	February 6, 2010
19	40	February 27, 2010	February 12, 2011
20	40	February 19, 2011	February 11, 2012
21	35	February 18, 2012	December 15, 2012
22	38	February 15, 2013	November 16, 2013
23	21	November 23, 2013	May 17, 2014
24	39	May 31, 2014	May 16, 2015
25	39	May 30, 2015	May 14, 2016
26	39	May 21, 2016	April 22, 2017
27	41	April 29, 2017	March 24, 2018
28	29	April 7, 2018	December 22, 2018
29	33	January 5, 2019	November 16, 2019
30	40	November 23, 2019	February 27, 2021
31	40	March 6, 2021	April 16, 2022
32	40	April 23, 2022	April 8, 2023
33	135	April 15, 2023	TBA

== Cast and characters ==
Character	Japanese	English			
Character	Japanese	Funimation Entertainment (2003–2018)	Bang Zoom! Entertainment (2020–2025, movies and specials)	Macias Group (2023)	Studio Nano (2025–present)
Jimmy Kudo (工藤 新一, Kudō Shin'ichi)	Kappei Yamaguchi	Jerry Jewell	Griffin Burns	Griffin Burns	Mauricio Ortiz-Segura
Conan Edogawa (江戸川 コナン, Edogawa Konan)	Minami Takayama	Alison Viktorin	Wendee Lee	Wendee Lee	Molly Zhang
Rachel Moore (毛利 蘭, Mōri Ran)	Wakana Yamazaki (1996–2026)	Colleen Clinkenbeard	Cristina Vee	Cristina Vee	Megan Shipman
Rachel Moore (毛利 蘭, Mōri Ran)	Akemi Okamura (2026–present)	Colleen Clinkenbeard	Cristina Vee	Cristina Vee	Megan Shipman
Richard Moore (毛利 小五郎, Mōri Kogorō)	Akira Kamiya	R. Bruce Elliot	Xander Mobus	Xander Mobus	Robert McCollum
Richard Moore (毛利 小五郎, Mōri Kogorō)	Rikiya Koyama	R. Bruce Elliot	Xander Mobus	Xander Mobus	Robert McCollum
Amy Yeager (吉田 歩美, Yoshida Ayumi)	Yukiko Iwai	Monica Rial	Janice Kawaye	Krystal Valdes	Abigail Blythe
Mitch Tennison (円谷 光彦, Tsuburaya Mitsuhiko)	Ikue Ōtani	Cynthia Cranz	Erika Harlacher	Ghia Burns	Brittney Karbowski
George Kaminski (小嶋 元太, Kojima Genta)	Wataru Takagi	Dameon Clarke	Andrew Russel	Jorge Barranco	Bryson Baugus
George Kaminski (小嶋 元太, Kojima Genta)	Wataru Takagi	Mike McFarland	Andrew Russel	Jorge Barranco	Bryson Baugus
Vi Graythorn (灰原 哀, Haibara Ai)	Megumi Hayashibara	Brina Palencia	Erica Mendez	Xanthe Huynh	Alexis Tipton
Vi Graythorn (灰原 哀, Haibara Ai)	Megumi Hayashibara	Brina Palencia	Xanthe Huynh	Xanthe Huynh	Alexis Tipton
Dr. Herschel Agasa (阿笠 博士, Agasa Hiroshi)	Kenichi Ogata	Bill Flynn	Michael Sorich	Oscar Cheda	Christopher Guerrero
Eva Kadan (妃 英理, Kisaki Eri)	Gara Takashima	Julie Mayfield	Mari Devon		Lydia Mackay
Eva Kadan (妃 英理, Kisaki Eri)	Gara Takashima	Julie Mayfield	Jane Alan		Lydia Mackay
Vivian Kudo (工藤 有希子, Kudō Yukiko)	Sumi Shimamoto	Laurie Steele	Erika Harlacher		Jad Saxton
Booker Kudo (工藤 優作, Kudō Yūsaku)	Hideyuki Tanaka	Randy Tallman	Keith Silverstein		Tom Henry
Booker Kudo (工藤 優作, Kudō Yūsaku)	Hideyuki Tanaka	John Swasey	Keith Silverstein		Tom Henry
Serena Sebastian (鈴木 園子, Suzuki Sonoko)	Naoko Matsui	Laura Bailey	Minx Le	Crystal Lopez	Bree Han
Masumi Sera (世良 真純, Sera Masumi)	Noriko Hidaka		Jenny Yokobori	Ghia Burns	
Harley Hartwell (服部 平次, Hattori Heiji)	Ryō Horikawa	Kevin M. Connolly	Lucien Dodge	Jason Kesser	Nazeeh Tarsha
Kirsten Thomas (遠山 和葉, Tōyama Kazuha)	Yūko Miyamura	Gwendolyn Lau	Kayli Mills	Andrea Villaverde	Raina Meginley
Joseph Meguire (目暮 十三警部, Megure Jūzō-keibu)	Chafurin	Mark Stoddard	Jake Eberle	Oscar Cheda	Mark Stoddard
Michele Simone (佐藤 美和子, Satō Miwako)	Atsuko Yuya	Kate Oxley	Katelyn Gault	Sarah Bartels	Natalie Van Sistine
Harry Wilder (高木 渉, Takagi Wataru)	Wataru Takagi	Doug Burks	Christopher Bevins	Diego Klock-Perez	Aaron Campbell
Kaito Kid (怪盗キッド, Kaitō Kiddo)	Kappei Yamaguchi	Jerry Jewell	Griffin Burns	Griffin Burns	Mauricio Ortiz-Segura
Gin (ジン, Jin)	Yukitoshi Hori	Troy Baker	D.C. Douglas		Nick Huber
Vodka (ウォッカ, Wokka)	Fumihiko Tachiki	Kyle Hebert	Edward Bosco		David Matranga
Vodka (ウォッカ, Wokka)	Fumihiko Tachiki	Christopher R. Sabat	Edward Bosco		David Matranga
Vermouth (ベルモット, Berumotto)	Mami Koyama		Laura Post		Colleen Clinkenbeard
Rei Furuya (降谷 零, Furuya Rei)	Tōru Furuya		Kyle McCarley	Jason Kesser	
Rei Furuya (降谷 零, Furuya Rei)	Takeshi Kusao		Howard Wang	Jason Kesser	

== Production ==
Yomiuri TV producer Michihiko Suwa had plans with Shogakukan's editorial department regarding the possibility of producing an anime adaptation of Gosho Aoyama's Case Closed as early as the 5th or 6th chapter of the manga was released. However, at the time, no broadcast slot was available. By around February–March 1995, it was decided that an adaptation would air at 7:30 on Monday nights, the slot last held by the anime of Magic Knight Rayearth, which Suwa also worked on as a producer. Although there were initial plans to schedule it at 7:00, the currently-airing Crayon Shin-chan on rival broadcaster TV Asahi led to a last-minute adjustment to 7:30. It would later be moved to 7:00 from October 20, 2008, to March 16, 2009, then to Saturday nights at 6:00 from April 4, 2009, onward. Kenji Kodama was approached to serve as the anime's first director. Masatomo Sudo has served as character designer from the beginning. In order to recreate Aoyama's art faithfully, Sudo did not want to draw lower lips on the characters' mouths and insisted on using the "color tracing" technique, despite experiencing pushback for it being labor intensive. Katsuo Ōno, a composer of live-action mystery dramas, was brought on to create the music. Yasuichiro Yamamoto, who had worked as an episode director from the start of the series, became chief director of the anime in 1998.

With Case Closed, the producers wanted to create an anime with a sense of familiarity to viewers similar to that of Sazae-san by thoroughly developing a recognizable and engaging format. As a result, Kodama implemented many unique devices, such as Conan's narration of the opening, post-credit scenes, a "Next Conan's Hint", and the cast's dialogue during the end card. The anime features many original stories not adapted from Aoyama's manga. For example, of the 39 episodes aired in 2025, 23 of them were originals created by the anime staff. Story editor Yukie Koyake explained that for such stories, the staff can not delve too deeply into the relationships between the characters. Around ten screenwriters work on the Case Closed anime at one time. One of them is mystery novelist Takahiro Okura, who was recommended to the staff by Aoyama himself in 2016. Original creator Gosho Aoyama provided the key animation for Jimmy and Rachel's first kiss during The Scarlet School Trip story arc.

== Release ==
The anime version of Case Closed was announced by Weekly Shōnen Sunday in November 1995. It is produced by Yomiuri Telecasting Corporation and TMS Entertainment. Over 1200 episodes have aired in Japan since the anime's premiere on January 8, 1996, making it the fourteenth longest anime series to date. Initially, Shogakukan collected and released the episodes on VHS video cassettes from June 1996 to October 2006. Four hundred and twenty-six episodes were released on VHS until Shogakukan abandoned the format and switched over to DVDs, starting over from the first episode. For the fifteenth anniversary of the anime series, the series was made available for video on demand. The series celebrated its 25th anniversary in January 2021, and the "Moonlight Sonata Murder Case" episode (11th episode of the series) was given the remake treatment as the first part of its celebration, which featured the latest staff and production techniques, and classical pianist Aimi Kobayashi performed Beethoven's Piano Sonata No. 14 for the episode. It aired on March 6, 2021.

As of 2018, the Detective Conan anime has been broadcast in 40 countries around the world. The Canadian channel YTV picked up the Case Closed series and broadcast 22 episodes between April 7, 2006, and September 2, 2006, before taking it off the air. Case Closed was later broadcast in North America on NHK's cable network TV Japan. Hanabee Entertainment licensed the series for distribution in Australia.

In 2003, the first 104 episodes, as well as the first six movies were licensed by Funimation for distribution in North America, under the title Case Closed because of legal considerations. The Case Closed anime has also been released in other languages such as French, German and Italian. Case Closed debuted on Cartoon Network as part of their Adult Swim programming block on May 24, 2004; no more than 50 episodes were licensed from Funimation due to low ratings. Funimation made the series available with the launch of the Funimation Channel in November 2005; it was temporary available on Colours TV during its syndication with the Funimation Channel. Funimation also released DVDs of their dubbed series beginning August 24, 2004. Initially, the releases were done in single DVDs and future episodes were released in seasonal boxes; 130 episodes have been released in total. The seasonal boxes were later re-released in redesigned boxes called Viridian edition. Funimation began streaming Case Closed episodes in March 2013. Finally, in 2018, Funimation lost the rights to the series.

A separate English adaptation of the series was made by Voiceovers Unlimited Pte Ltd. in Singapore. Another one by Animax Asia premiered in the Philippines on January 18, 2006, under the name Detective Conan. Because Animax were unable to obtain further TV broadcast rights, their version comprised only 52 episodes. The series continued with reruns until August 7, 2006, when it was removed from the station. Both the Singapore and Philippines versions used Japanese character names. The California-based channel United Television Broadcasting (UTB) aired it with English subtitles from 2011 to 2014, until episode 421.

Crunchyroll began simulcasting the series in October 2014, starting with episode 754. In September 2020, Crunchyroll began streaming the first 42 episodes, later adding episodes 42–123 in August 2021 (with any special episodes with an extended runtime that were previously split into multiple parts being presented as they were originally broadcast in Japan). In August 2024, Crunchyroll removed the first 123 episodes. In January 2016, 52 episodes of the anime appeared on Netflix, initially under its original title Detective Conan before changing to its English moniker Case Closed. The episodes were listed as "season one", although in reality they are episodes 748 to 799. The episodes were only available in Japanese, but were subtitled. The availability was likely part of Netflix's efforts to expand its anime catalog. In January 2021, Netflix removed the episodes.

It was revealed in February 2023 that TMS Entertainment commissioned a new English dub of Case Closed, with episodes of the anime beginning streaming on Tubi that same month, starting at episode 965. This marked the first English dub for the series since 2010. The dub is produced by Florida-based studio Macias Group with a new dub cast (except for the voices of Shinichi, Conan, Ran, Kogoro, and Kaito Kid, whose voice actors were retained from the Bang Zoom! Entertainment home video dubs). However, it is no longer streaming as of February 2025.

On June 26, 2025, TMS revealed that a new English dub of select episodes would launch on Netflix and Crunchyroll in selected territories, including North America under the international title Detective Conan, beginning on July 3 of the same year. The first batch of episodes, Conan vs. The Black Organization, will be followed by four films, also released as Detective Conan on TMS' "Anime! on TMS" YouTube channel in North America within the month for a limited period of time.

=== Films ===
Twenty-seven feature films based on the Case Closed series have been released. They are animated by TMS Entertainment and produced by TMS, Yomiuri Telecasting Corporation, Nippon Television, Shogakukan, ShoPro, and Toho. The first seven were directed by Kenji Kodama; films 8–14 were directed by Yasuichiro Yamamoto; films 15–21 were directed by Kobun Shizuno; film 22 and 26 were directed by Yuzuru Tachikawa; films 23, 24, and 27 were directed by Chika Nagaoka; and film 25 was directed by Susumu Mitsunaka. The films have been released in April of each year, starting in 1997 with the first film, Case Closed: The Time Bombed Skyscraper. The 27th and latest film, Detective Conan: The Million-dollar Pentagram, was released on April 12, 2024. The second film and onwards were the top twenty grossing anime films in Japan. The revenue earned from the films funded Toho's other film projects. Each film was adapted into two film comics which were released in the fourth quarter of the same year. Funimation released English dubbed versions of the first six films on Region 1 DVDs between October 3, 2006, and February 16, 2010. Bang Zoom! Entertainment has released English dubs of Case Closed films through Discotek Media, starting with the Episode One TV special on July 28, 2020.

=== Original video animations ===
Two original video animations (OVA) series were produced by TMS Entertainment, Nippon Television, and Yomiuri Telecasting Corporation. The OVA series Shōnen Sunday Original Animation are yearly mail order episodes available to subscribers of Weekly Shōnen Sunday. The first Shōnen Sunday Original Animation was available in Weekly Shōnen Sunday's 26th issue in 2000, with eleven OVAs released as of 2011. The first nine episodes of the OVA series were later encapsulated into four DVD volumes titled Secret Files and were released between March 24, 2006, and April 9, 2010. The second OVA series, entitled Magic File, consists of yearly direct-to-DVD releases. The first Magic File was released on April 11, 2007, and contained four episodes from the anime series. The subsequent Magic File OVAs contained an original plot with background ties related to their respective Case Closed theatrical films, beginning with the twelfth film Detective Conan: Full Score of Fear.

=== Television special ===
A two-hour television special titled Lupin the 3rd vs. Detective Conan was produced by TMS Entertainment, Nippon Television, and Yomiuri Telecasting Corporation and aired on March 27, 2009. It was first announced in the 9th issue of Weekly Shōnen Sunday in 2009. The plot follows Kudo as he investigates the death of the Queen of Vespania while Arsène Lupin III from the Lupin III series attempts to steal the Queen's crown. The special earned a household record rating of 19.5 in Japan. VAP released the special on DVD and Blu-ray Disc on July 24, 2009. The special is followed by Lupin the 3rd vs. Detective Conan: The Movie which takes place after the television special.

== Music ==
=== Openings ===
#	Song Title	Artist	Episodes
1	Mune ga Dokidoki	Japanese: The High-Lows; English: Carl Finch	Episode 1 (January 8, 1996) – Episode 30 (August 26, 1996)
2	Feel Your Heart	Velvet Garden	Episode 31 (September 2, 1996) – Episode 52 (March 17, 1997)
3	Nazo	Japanese: Miho Komatsu; English: Stephanie Nadolny	Episode 53 (April 7, 1997) – Episode 96 (March 23, 1998)
4	Unmei no Roulette Mawashite	Zard	Episode 97 (April 13, 1998) – Episode 123 (November 9, 1998)
5	Truth (A Great Detective of Love)	Two-Mix	Episode 124 (November 16, 1998) – Episode 142 (April 26, 1999)
6	Giri Giri Chop	B'z	Episode 143 (May 3, 1999) – Episode 167 (November 8, 1999)
7	Mysterious Eyes	Garnet Crow	Episode 168 (November 15, 1999) – Episode 204 (August 21, 2000)
8	Koi wa Thrill, Shock, Suspense	Rina Aiuchi	Episode 205 (August 28, 2000) – Episode 230 (April 16, 2001)
9	Destiny	Miki Matsuhashi	Episode 231 (April 23, 2001) – Episode 258 (November 19, 2001)
10	Winter Bells	Mai Kuraki	Episode 259 (November 26, 2001) – Episode 270 (March 4, 2002)
11	I Can't Stop My Love For You	Rina Aiuchi	Episode 271 (March 11, 2002) – Episode 305 (January 13, 2003)
12	Kaze no La La La	Mai Kuraki	Episode 306 (January 20, 2003) – Episode 332 (August 18, 2003)
13	Kimi to Yakusoku Shita Yasashii Ano Basho Made	U-ka Saegusa in db	Episode 333 (August 25, 2003) – Episode 355 (March 15, 2004)
14	Start	Rina Aiuchi	Episode 356 (April 12, 2004) – Episode 393 (March 21, 2005)
15	Hoshi no Kagayaki yo	Zard	Episode 394 (April 18, 2005) – Episode 414 (September 12, 2005)
16	Growing of My Heart	Mai Kuraki	Episode 415 (October 10, 2005) – Episode 424 (December 19, 2005)
17	Shōdō	B'z	Episode 425 (January 9, 2006) – Episode 437 (May 8, 2006)
18	100 mono Tobira	Rina Aiuchi & U-ka Saegusa in db	Episode 438 (May 15, 2006) – Episode 456 (November 13, 2006)
19	Kumo ni Notte	U-ka Saegusa in db	Episode 457 (November 20, 2006) – Episode 474 (June 4, 2007)
20	Namida no Yesterday	Garnet Crow	Episode 475 (June 18, 2007) – Episode 486 (September 3, 2007)
21	Glorious Mind	Zard	Episode 487 (October 15, 2007) – Episode 490 (December 3, 2007)
22	Ai wa Kurayami no Naka de	Zard	Episode 491 (January 14, 2008) – Episode 504 (May 19, 2008)
23	Ichibyōgoto ni Love for You	Mai Kuraki	Episode 505 (June 16, 2008) – Episode 514 (September 8, 2008)
24	Mysterious	Naifu	Episode 515 (October 20, 2008) – Episode 520 (December 15, 2008)
25	Revive	Mai Kuraki	Episode 521 (January 19, 2009) – Episode 529 (March 16, 2009)
26	Everlasting Luv	Breakerz	Episode 530 (April 18, 2009) – Episode 546 (September 12, 2009)
27	Magic	Rina Aiuchi	Episode 547 (September 19, 2009) – Episode 564 (January 30, 2010)
28	As the Dew	Garnet Crow	Episode 565 (February 6, 2010) – Episode 582 (July 24, 2010)
29	Summer Time Gone	Mai Kuraki	Episode 583 (August 14, 2010) – Episode 601 (December 25, 2010)
30	Tear Drops	Caos Caos Caos	Episode 602 (January 8, 2011) – Episode 612 (April 23, 2011)
31	Don't Wanna Lie	B'z	Episode 613 (April 30, 2011) – Episode 626 (July 30, 2011)
32	Misty Mystery	Garnet Crow	Episode 627 (August 20, 2011) – Episode 641 (December 17, 2011)
33	Miss Mystery	Breakerz	Episode 642 (January 7, 2012) – Episode 666 (July 28, 2012)
34	Kimi no Namida ni Konna ni Koi Shiteru	Natsu Iro	Episode 667 (September 1, 2012) – Episode 680 (December 15, 2012)
35	Try Again	Mai Kuraki	Episode 681 (January 5, 2013) – Episode 695 (April 27, 2013)
36	Q&A	B'z	Episode 696 (May 4, 2013) – Episode 717 (November 9, 2013)
37	Butterfly Core	Valshe	Episode 718 (November 16, 2013) – Episode 743 (June 21, 2014)
38	Greed	Knock Out Monkey	Episode 744 (June 28, 2014) – Episode 756 (October 25, 2014)
39	Dynamite	Mai Kuraki	Episode 757 (November 1, 2014) – Episode 773 (March 28, 2015)
40	We Go	Breakerz	Episode 774 (April 18, 2015) – Episode 789 (August 15, 2015)
41	Nazo	La PomPon	Episode 790 (September 5, 2015) – Episode 803 (December 12, 2015)
42	Hane	Koshi Inaba	Episode 804 (January 9, 2016) – Episode 816 (May 7, 2016)
43	Sekai wa Anata no Iro ni Naru	B'z	Episode 817 (May 14, 2016) – Episode 844 (December 24, 2016)
44	Ikusen no Meikyuu de Ikusen no Nazo wo Doite	Breakerz	Episode 845 (January 7, 2017) – Episode 868 (July 29, 2017)
45	Lie, Lie, Lie,	Maki Ohguro	Episode 869 (August 5, 2017) – Episode 886 (December 23, 2017)
46	Everything OK!!	Cellchrome	Episode 887 (January 6, 2018) – Episode 902 (May 19, 2018)
47	Countdown	NormCore	Episode 903 (May 26, 2018) – Episode 915 (September 29, 2018)
48	Timeline	dps	Episode 916 (October 6, 2018) – Episode 926 (December 22, 2018)
49	Barairo no Jinsei	Mai Kuraki	Episode 927 (January 5, 2019) – Episode 940 (May 11, 2019)
50	Answer	Only This Time	Episode 941 (June 1, 2019) – Episode 964 (December 21, 2019)
51	Makka na Lip	Wands	Episode 965 (January 4, 2020) – Episode 982 (September 26, 2020)
52	Just Believe You	All At Once	Episode 983 (October 3, 2020) – Episode 999 (February 27, 2021)
53	Zero kara Hajimete	Mai Kuraki	Episode 1000 (March 6, 2021) – Episode 1020 (September 25, 2021)
54	Yura Yura	Wands	Episode 1021 (October 2, 2021) – Episode 1032 (December 25, 2021)
55	Sleepless	B'z	Episode 1033 (January 8, 2022) – Episode 1048 (June 25, 2022)
56	Sparkle	Maki Ohguro	Episode 1049 (July 9, 2022) – Episode 1076 (March 4, 2023)
57	Raise Insight	Wands	Episode 1077 (March 25, 2023) – Episode 1101 (October 21, 2023)
58	Unraveling Love ~Sukoshi no Yuuki~	Mai Kuraki	Episode 1102 (November 4, 2023) – Episode 1147 (December 28, 2024)
59	But No Love	Rainy	Episode 1148 (January 4, 2025) – Episode 1167 (June 28, 2025)
60	Poker Face	Amyuri	Episode 1168 (July 19, 2025) – Episode 1186 (December 27, 2025)
61	Heaven Knows	B'z	Episode 1188 (January 10, 2026) – Episode 1205 (June 27, 2026)
62	Ai no Fire	Leon Niihama	Episode 1206 (July 11, 2026) – present

=== Endings ===
#	Song Title	Artist	Episodes
1	Step by Step	Japanese: Ziggy; English: Gary Eckert	Episode 1 (January 8, 1996) – Episode 26 (July 29, 1996)
2	Meikyū no Lovers	Heath	Episode 27 (August 5, 1996) – Episode 51 (March 10, 1997)
3	Hikari to Kage no Roman	Japanese: Keiko Utoku; English: Stephanie Nadolny	Episode 52 (March 17, 1997) – Episode 70 (August 4, 1997)
4	Kimi ga Inai Natsu	Japanese: Deen; English: Carl Finch	Episode 71 (August 11, 1997) – Episode 83 (December 1, 1997)
5	Negai goto Hitotsu Dake	Miho Komatsu	Episode 84 (December 8, 1997) – Episode 108 (July 6, 1998)
6	Kōri no ue ni Tatsu yō ni	Miho Komatsu	Episode 109 (July 13, 1998) – Episode 131 (January 18, 1999)
7	Still for Your Love	Rumania Montevideo	Episode 132 (January 25, 1999) – Episode 152 (July 12, 1999)
8	Free Magic	Wag	Episode 153 (July 19, 1999) – Episode 179 (February 7, 2000)
9	Secret of My Heart	Mai Kuraki	Episode 180 (February 14, 2000) – Episode 204 (August 21, 2000)
10	Natsu no Maboroshi	Garnet Crow	Episode 205 (August 28, 2000) – Episode 218 (December 18, 2000)
11	Start in My Life	Mai Kuraki	Episode 219 (January 8, 2001) – Episode 232 (May 7, 2001)
12	Always	Mai Kuraki	Episode 233 (May 14, 2001) – Episode 247 (August 20, 2001)
13	Aoi Aoi Kono Hoshi ni	Azumi Uehara	Episode 248 (August 27, 2001) – Episode 265 (January 21, 2002)
14	Yumemita Ato de	Garnet Crow	Episode 266 (January 28, 2002) – Episode 287 (July 22, 2002)
15	Mushoku	Azumi Uehara	Episode 288 (July 29, 2002) – Episode 299 (November 4, 2002)
16	Overture	Koshi Inaba	Episode 300 (November 18, 2002) – Episode 306 (January 20, 2003)
17	Ashita wo Yume Mite	Zard	Episode 307 (January 27, 2003) – Episode 328 (July 14, 2003)
18	Kimi to iu Hikari	Garnet Crow	Episode 329 (July 28, 2003) – Episode 349 (February 2, 2004)
19	Nemuru Kimi no Yokogao ni Hohoemi wo	U-ka Saegusa in dB	Episode 350 (February 9, 2004) – Episode 375 (October 25, 2004)
20	Wasurezaki	Garnet Crow	Episode 376 (November 1, 2004) – Episode 397 (May 9, 2005)
21	June Bride ~Anata shika Mienai~	U-ka Saegusa in dB	Episode 398 (May 16, 2005) – Episode 406 (July 11, 2005)
22	Sekai Tomete	Shiori Takei	Episode 407 (July 18, 2005) – Episode 416 (October 17, 2005)
23	Thank You For Everything	Sayuri Iwata	Episode 417 (October 24, 2005) – Episode 424 (December 19, 2005)
24	Kanashī Hodo Anata ga Suki	Zard	Episode 425 (January 9, 2006) – Episode 437 (May 8, 2006)
25	Mou Kimi dake wo Hanashitari Shinai	Aya Kamiki	Episode 438 (May 15, 2006) – Episode 458 (November 27, 2006)
26	Shiroi Yuki	Mai Kuraki	Episode 459 (December 4, 2006) – Episode 470 (April 30, 2007)
27	I Still Believe ~Tameiki~	Yumi Shizukusa	Episode 471 (May 7, 2007) – Episode 486 (September 3, 2007)
28	Sekai wa Mawaru to iu Keredo	Garnet Crow	Episode 487 (October 15, 2007) – Episode 490 (December 3, 2007)
29	Yukidoke no Ano Kawa no Nagare no You ni	U-ka Saegusa in dB	Episode 491 (January 14, 2008) – Episode 504 (May 19, 2008)
30	Summer Memories	Aya Kamiki	Episode 505 (June 16, 2008) – Episode 514 (September 8, 2008)
31	Go Your Own Way	Yumi Shizukusa	Episode 515 (October 20, 2008) – Episode 520 (December 15, 2008)
32	Koigokoro Kagayaki nagara	Naifu	Episode 521 (January 19, 2009) – Episode 529 (March 16, 2009)
33	Doing All Right	Garnet Crow	Episode 530 (April 18, 2009) – Episode 539 (July 4, 2009)
34	Hikari	Breakerz	Episode 540 (July 11, 2009) – Episode 561 (December 26, 2009)
35	Hello Mr. My Yesterday	Hundred Percent Free	Episode 562 (January 16, 2010) – Episode 587 (September 11, 2010)
36	Tomorrow is the Last Time	Mai Kuraki	Episode 588 (September 18, 2010) – Episode 601 (December 25, 2010)
37	Jūgoya Crisis ~Kimi ni Aitai~	Hundred Percent Free	Episode 602 (January 8, 2011) – Episode 609 (March 19, 2011)
38	Tsukiyo no Itazura no Mahou	Breakerz	Episode 610 (April 9, 2011) – Episode 626 (July 30, 2011)
39	Pilgrim	B'z	Episode 627 (August 20, 2011) – Episode 628 (August 27, 2011)
40	Your Best Friend	Mai Kuraki	Episode 629 (September 3, 2011) – Episode 643 (January 14, 2012)
41	Kanashī hodo Kyou no Yūhi Kirei dane	grram	Episode 644 (February 4, 2012) – Episode 653 (April 28, 2012)
42	Overwrite	Breakerz	Episode 654 (May 5, 2012) – Episode 666 (July 28, 2012)
43	Koi ni Koishite	Mai Kuraki	Episode 667 (September 1, 2012) – Episode 686 (February 9, 2013)
44	Hitomi no Melody	Boyfriend	Episode 687 (February 16, 2013) – Episode 704 (August 3, 2013)
45	Kimi no Egao ga Naniyori mo Sukidatta	Chicago Poodle	Episode 705 (August 10, 2013) – Episode 721 (December 7, 2013)
46	Ima Aitakute...	Daigo	Episode 722 (December 14, 2013) – Episode 736 (April 26, 2014)
47	Rain Man	Akihide	Episode 737 (May 3, 2014) – Episode 749 (August 9, 2014)
48	Muteki na Heart	Mai Kuraki	Episode 750 (September 6, 2014) – Episode 762 (December 13, 2014)
49	Kimi e no Uso	Valshe	Episode 763 (January 10, 2015) – Episode 803 (December 12, 2015)
50	Unmei no Roulette Mawashite	La PomPon	Episode 804 (January 9, 2016) – Episode 812 (March 12, 2016)
51	Futari no Byoushou	Takuto	Episode 813 (April 16, 2016) – Episode 826 (July 23, 2016)
52	Sawage☆Life	Mai Kuraki	Episode 827 (July 30, 2016) – Episode 842 (December 10, 2016)
53	Yesterday Love	Mai Kuraki	Episode 843 (December 17, 2016) – Episode 864 (June 24, 2017)
54	Yume Monogatari	Breakerz	Episode 865 (July 8, 2017) – Episode 875 (September 30, 2017)
55	Togetsugyou ~Kimi Omou~	Mai Kuraki	Episode 876 (October 7, 2017) – Episode 886 (December 23, 2017)
56	Kamikaze Express	Takuto x Miyakawa-kun	Episode 887 (January 6, 2018) – Episode 908 (July 21, 2018)
57	Sadame	First Place	Episode 909 (July 28, 2018) – Episode 914 (September 22, 2018)
58	Aozolighter	Cellchrome	Episode 915 (September 29, 2018) – Episode 926 (December 22, 2018)
59	Kimi to Koi no Mama de Owarenai Itsumo Yume no Mama ja Irarenai	Mai Kuraki	Episode 928 (January 12, 2019) – Episode 951 (August 17, 2019)
60	Sissy Sky	Airi Miyagawa	Episode 952 (August 31, 2019) – Episode 964 (December 21, 2019)
61	Sukoshizutsu Shikushizutsu	Sard Underground	Episode 965 (January 4, 2020) – Episode 976 (July 18, 2020)
62	Hoshiai	All At Once	Episode 977 (August 1, 2020) – Episode 992 (December 26, 2020)
63	Reboot	Airi Miyagawa	Episode 993 (January 9, 2021) – Episode 1015 (August 14, 2021)
64	Veronika	Mai Kuraki	Episode 1016 (August 28, 2021) – Episode 1028 (November 27, 2021)
65	Sweet Moonlight	Breakerz	Episode 1029 (December 4, 2021) – Episode 1038 (March 12, 2022)
66	Karappo no Kokoro	Sard Underground	Episode 1039 (April 16, 2022) – Episode 1057 (September 24, 2022)
67	Playmaker	All At Once feat. Yudai Ohno from Da-ice	Episode 1058 (October 1, 2022) – Episode 1073 (February 11, 2023)
68	Kufuku	Konya, Anomachikara starring Valshe	Episode 1074 (February 18, 2023) – Episode 1087 (June 17, 2023)
69	...and Rescue Me	Rainy	Episode 1088 (June 24, 2023) – Episode 1104 (November 18, 2023)
70	You & I	Mai Kuraki	Episode 1105 (December 2, 2023) – Episode 1131 (August 3, 2024)
71	Yume de Aimashou	Sard Underground	Episode 1132 (August 17, 2024) – Episode 1147 (December 28, 2024)
72	Shooting Star	Wands	Episode 1148 (January 4, 2025) – Episode 1157 (March 15, 2025)
73	Fun! Fun! Fun!	Leon Niihama	Episode 1158 (April 12, 2025) – Episode 1186 (December 27, 2025)
74	TOWA Riding the Wind Forever	Mai Kuraki	Episode 1188 (January 10, 2026) – Episode 1202 (May 30, 2026)
75	7 Days	Rainy	Episode 1203 (June 13, 2026) – Episode 1213 (September 19, 2026)
76	Ai de Zenbu Dakishimete Aishite	Mai Kuraki	Episode 1214 (September 26, 2026) – present

== Reception ==
=== Popularity ===
The animated adaptation of the series has remained popular in Japan since its premiere, appearing in the top six of Japanese TV Rankings at various times. The television series ranked among the top twenty in polls conducted by anime magazine Animage from 1996 to 2001. It also placed better than twenty-third in polls for the Top 100 anime conducted by Japanese television network TV Asahi in 2005–06. The series received considerable airtime in China; it was the second most broadcast animation there in 2004.

=== Critical response ===
In the United States, the dubbed series faced several negative reactions toward its changes to localize the content for international English-speaking audiences, mostly North American. Jeffrey Harris of IGN found it pointless to change the names of the characters, and Anime News Network's Carl Kimlinger said that the changes of certain Japanese cultural references rendered several parts of the mysteries and their investigation illogical. The voice-overs proved to be a mixed bag for Carlo Santos, who reviewed the first DVD release of Case Closed for Anime News Network; he said that while the main characters sounded like "real people", the secondary ones "[came] off as caricatures".

=== Accolades ===
At the 2nd Crunchyroll Anime Awards in 2018, the anime series was nominated for Best Continuing Series. The series won the Anime Grand Prize in 2024 and 2025 TVer Awards, topping the platform's category in total views.

Several of the franchise's films were nominated for awards in their home country. The ninth film was nominated for the feature film category at the 5th Annual Tokyo Anime Awards, and the next five films were nominees for the Japan Academy Prize for Animation of the Year in their respective years of release.
