= Case Closed season 25 =

Season of television series

Case Closed
- Season 25
- The cover of the first DVD compilation for season twenty-five of Detective Conan released by Shogakukan
- No. of episodes: 39

Release
- Original network: NNS (ytv)
- Original release: May 30, 2015 – May 14, 2016

Season chronology
- ← Previous; Season 24 Next → Season 26

The twenty-fifth season of the Case Closed anime was directed by Yasuichiro Yamamoto and produced by TMS Entertainment and Yomiuri Telecasting Corporation. The series is based on Gosho Aoyama's Case Closed manga series. In Japan, the series is titled Meitantei Conan (名探偵コナン, lit. Great Detective Conan, officially translated as Detective Conan) but was changed due to legal issues with the title Detective Conan. The series focuses on the adventures of teenage detective Shinichi Kudo who was turned into a child by a poison called APTX 4869, but continues working as a detective under the alias Conan Edogawa.

The episodes use seven pieces of theme music: four openings and three endings. The first opening theme is "WE GO" by Breakerz, which was used until episode 789. The second opening theme is Nazo (謎, lit."Mystery"; Nazo) and is a cover song by La PomPon which was originally sung by Miho Komatsu, used for episodes 790 - 803. The third opening theme is Hane (羽, lit."Feather") by Koshi Inaba used for episodes 804 - 816. (This is Koshi's second solo contribution to the series, after "Overture" was used as an ending theme in 2002.) The fourth opening theme is Sekai wa Anata no Iro ni Naru (世界はあなたの色になる, lit."The World Will Become Your Color") by B'z and starts at episode 817. (This is also used for film 20: The Darkest Nightmare.) The first ending theme is Kimi e no Uso (君への嘘, lit."Lie to You") by Valshe which is used until episode 803. The second ending theme is Unmei no Roulette Mawashite (運命のルーレット廻して, lit. "Spinning the Roulette of Destiny") and is a cover song by La PomPon which was originally sung by Zard, the La Pompon version starts at episode 804 and was used until episode 812. The third ending theme is Futari no Byōshin (ふたりの秒針, lit."The Clock's Second Hand") by Takuto and starts at episode 813.

The season initially ran from May 30, 2015, through May 14, 2016, on Nippon Television Network System in Japan. The season was later collected and released in ten DVD compilations by Shogakukan between January 27, 2017, and November 24, 2017, in Japan. Crunchyroll began simulcasting the series in October 2014, starting with episode 754.

== Episode list ==
No.	No. in season	Title	Directed by	Written by	Original air date
779	1	"The Scarlet Prologue"; Transliteration: "Hīro no Joshō" (Japanese: 緋色の序章)	Minoru Tozawa	N/A	May 30, 2015
Tooru Amuro witnesses a woman pushed from the top of the stairs at Haido Park. However, he doesn't see the culprit's face. The unconscious and gravely injured woman pushed from the stairs is Jodie Starling's friend and Haido Elementary School teacher Natsuko Shibuya. Conan and Jodie head to the park and determine Natsuko was attacked somewhere else, and it soon becomes clear she was assaulted at the school. Later, Megure and the police question her coworker Yoshiharu Sugamoto, who tried to give Natsuko a ride home, and Akiyo Ueno and Fumiyuki Kandachi, parents of students who had appointments to see Natsuko.
780	2	"The Scarlet Pursuit"; Transliteration: "Hīro no Suikyū" (Japanese: 緋色の追求)	Takanori Yano	N/A	June 6, 2015
The police review a photo of the answer sheets Natsuko was grading. Jodie and Camel fail to discover any information that could help them solve the crime from the photo, but Amuro and Conan realize who the culprit is after seeing the picture.
781	3	"The Scarlet Intersection"; Transliteration: "Hīro no Kōsaku" (Japanese: 緋色の交錯)	Nobuharu Kamanaka	N/A	June 13, 2015
When Conan hears Camel's story, he realizes Vermouth disguised herself as Jodie and spoke with him. Conan is frustrated that he acted just as Bourbon (Amuro) and Vermouth planned. Amuro meets with Vermouth, who is still disguised as Jodie. She informs him she learned from Camel that Kusuda shot himself. Amuro responds that there was another burned man who was shot in the head when Kusuda disappeared. With thoughts of FBI agent Akai Shuichi on his mind, Amuro deduces that Akai is still alive.
782	4	"The Scarlet Return"; Transliteration: "Hiiro no Kikan" (Japanese: 緋色の帰還)	Akira Yoshimura	N/A	June 20, 2015
Amuro visits Okiya at the Edo family home and begins explaining how one corpse was swapped out for another. Akai was shot in the head and burned along with his car at Raiha Pass. However, Amuro believes Akai switched his own body out for Kusuda's and is in fact still alive. Amuro explains Akai's trick step by step to Okiya. Meanwhile, Jodie was thinking the same thing as Amuro. Amuro reasons the body swap was planned not by Akai but by Conan. Amuro then asks Okiya to remove his mask. He is certain Okiya is Akai.
783	5	"The Scarlet Truth"; Transliteration: "Hiiro no Shinsō" (Japanese: 緋色の真相)	Yasuichiro Yamamoto	N/A	June 27, 2015
Akai suddenly appears in the back seat of Jodie's car and fires at the secret police's vehicles. The bullet strikes a tire, and the FBI agents successfully shake off the secret police. Meanwhile at the Kudo family home, Amuro's subordinates inform him Akai shot out a tire, causing their cars to crash. Later, Jodie's car returns to the crash site. Akai takes a cell phone from the secret police and begins speaking to Amuro (Bourbon). He tells him it was a mistake to let Conan know he had the nickname Zero. Akai knew who Amuro truly was.
784	6	"Welcome to Club Orihime"; Transliteration: "Orihime Kurabu he Yōkoso" (Japanese: 織り姫クラブへようこそ)	Keisuke Shinohara	Junichi Miyashita	July 11, 2015
Sonoko's acquaintance Chikada Eimi of Orihime Club invites her to investigate pranks, to which Ran and Conan get dragged along. Before each prank, warning letters are sent to Club Orihime warning them of the pranks. That morning they received a letter stating, "EC will be brought to justice!" The letters are the initials of the victim. At the scene of the crime, they find a new letter stating, "TB dies as sundown tonight!" Only two hours remain until sunset. To prevent another incident from occurring, Conan and his friends search for a student with the initials TB.
785	7	"Taiko Meijin's Match of Love (Part 1)"; Transliteration: "Taikō Koisuru Meijin-sen (Zenpen)" (Japanese: 太閤恋する名人戦（前編）)	Koichiro Kuroda	N/A	July 18, 2015
Shukichi won important matches to help him win his 4th, 5th and 6th titles. Before he begins his title match to become only the 2nd Nanakanou (Shogi player with all 7 titles) in history, he receives a letter. He opens the letter only to find out that Yumi was kidnapped and is trapped in a well. The letter contains clues pertaining to the whereabouts of Yumi. He arrives at the location but cannot find the well. Upon the arrival, he bumps into Conan and the Detective Boys who immediately ask the real purpose of Shukichi. The match is postponed as Shukichi attempts to win both the battle of Shogi and love.
786	8	"Taiko Meijin's Match of Love (Part 2)"; Transliteration: "Taikō Koisuru Meijin-sen (Kōhen)" (Japanese: 太閤恋する名人戦（後編）)	Minoru Tozawa	N/A	July 25, 2015
Shukichi and the Detective Boys continue to search for clues about the whereabouts of kidnapped Yumi. Shukichi's time is limited as he needs to go back for his Shogi tournament.
787	9	"The Mystery Sinking in the Midsummer Pool (Part 1)"; Transliteration: "Manatsu no Pūru ni Shizumu Nazo (Zenpen)" (Japanese: 真夏のプールに沈む謎（前編）)	Takanori Yano	N/A	August 1, 2015
Conan and his friends go to a hotel pool when Nagami Oiso, the spoiled daughter of the hotel's owner, is found drowned in the pool. She had been wearing a diving tank and searching the pool for her lost necklace. Based on the crime scene, Inspector Megure believes it may have been an accident. However, the hotel bellboys claim the body in the pool suddenly appeared.
788	10	"The Mystery Sinking in the Midsummer Pool (Part 2)"; Transliteration: "Manatsu no Pū ni Shizumu Nazo (Kōhen)" (Japanese: 真夏のプールに沈む謎（後編）)	Makiko Hayase	N/A	August 8, 2015
Conan and Sera investigate the pool and discover which of the victim's three acquaintances murdered her after conducting a unique experiment in the pool.
789	11	"The Queen's Weather Forecast"; Transliteration: "Joō-sama no Tenkiyohō" (Japanese: 女王様の天気予報)	Yorihisa Koyata	Koshiro Mikami	August 15, 2015
A weather forecaster falls to her death after leaning on a second-floor railing, but Conan notices several suspicious things about the body.
790	12	"Bekapon's Bleeding Service"; Transliteration: "Bekapon Shukettsu Dai Sābisu" (Japanese: 米花ポン出血大サービス)	Koichiro Kuroda	Nobuo Ogizawa	September 5, 2015
A man in a ski mask came running with a knife after shouting "Die, Kanzaki!" and stabbed Shimomura who was wearing the Bekapon costume instead of Kanzaki.
791	13	"Detective Takagi On the Run in Handcuffs"; Transliteration: "Takagi-keiji, Tejō de Tōsō" (Japanese: 高木刑事、手錠で逃走)	Akira Yoshimura	Junichi Miyashita	September 12, 2015
Detective Takagi and Ryuta Someya must work together as a team to find their way back to Tokyo because they are handcuffed together and Detective Takagi has lost the key.
792	14	"Three First Discoverers (Part 1)"; Transliteration: "San'nin no Daiichihakkensha (Zenpen)" (Japanese: 三人の第一発見者（前編）)	Keisuke Shinohara	N/A	September 19, 2015
Conan asks Haibara to give him information about Rum, the new Black Organization member who is on the move. She says she doesn't know much about him, but she knows that the descriptions about Rum are always different. Some people say Rum looks feminine, others say he looks like a well-built man, and some describe him as an old man. However, there is a common characteristic about him that she can't recall. The Detective Boys end up involved in a case again and the three suspects fit each one of the descriptions about Rum.
793	15	"Three First Discoverers (Part 2)"; Transliteration: "San'nin no Daiichihakkensha (Kōhen)" (Japanese: 三人の第一発見者（後編）)	Minoru Tozawa	N/A	September 26, 2015
Conan helps the police solve the case and reveals the truth behind it. The Detective Boys leave the crime scene and Ai Haibara has remembered this common feature about Rum that everyone who has met him agrees on.
794	16	"Bodyguard Kogorō Mōri"; Transliteration: "Bodīgādo Mōri Kogorō" (Japanese: ボディーガード毛利小五郎)	Takanori Yano	Junichi Miyashita	October 3, 2015
Kogoro becomes the bodyguard of a famous actress when someone is trying to kill her.
795	17	"The Secret of the Missing Young Lady"; Transliteration: "Wakaokusama ga Kieta Himitsu" (Japanese: 若奥様が消えた秘密)	Yasuichiro Yamamoto	Tatsuro Inamoto	October 10, 2015
While walking past the Makabe residence, Ayumi witnessed Jun carrying an unconscious Yuri to the backseat of his car and then driving off. Upon seeing the unconscious Ayumi inside of his house, Jun carried her away in his car headed towards an unknown location.
796	18	"The Lovebirds' Ruse"; Transliteration: "Oshidorifūfu no Sakuryaku" (Japanese: おしどり夫婦の策略)	Makiko Hayase	Shintaro Ueda Nobuo Ogizawa	October 17, 2015
Chosaku Kanbayashi was found dead on the ground after apparently falling from his office window.
797	19	"The Dreaming Girl's Confused Deduction"; Transliteration: "Yumemiru Otome no Meisuiri" (Japanese: 夢見る乙女の迷推理)	Koichiro Kuroda	Junichi Miyashita	October 24, 2015
A weird girl who calls herself Funachi meets with Kogoro to get his help to find a missing person. But Kogoro declines her request, so Conan decides to help her instead. Funachi and Conan work together to find a missing person named Hikone who apparently resembles a hero in an otaku game.
798	20	"The Moving Target"; Transliteration: "Ugoku Hyōteki" (Japanese: 動く標的)	Akira Yoshimura	Nobuo Ogizawa	November 7, 2015
A drunken man was saved by Conan when he fell from the top of a building, before the man hit the other person who is standing right below the place where the man fell. It seems the man committed suicide, but the evidence lead Conan to think that someone else caused the man to fall.
799	21	"Detective Boys' Locked Room Mystery Battle"; Transliteration: "Tantei-dan no Misshitsu Suiri Gassen" (Japanese: 探偵団の密室推理合戦)	Takanori Yano	Masaki Tsuji	November 14, 2015
When Professor Agasa unlocks the grounds of a building site for the Detective Boys to play soccer, he finds a body floating in a pool that's filled with water from last night's rain.
800	22	"After That 100 Million Yen"; Transliteration: "Ichiokuen o Oikakero" (Japanese: 1億円を追いかけろ)	Minoru Tozawa	Takeo Ohno	November 21, 2015
Reina has been kidnapped, and the culprit demands the astronomic sum of 100 million yen for her safe release.
801	23	"Tottori Sand Dunes Mystery Tour (Kurayoshi Part)"; Transliteration: "Tottori Sakyū Misuterī Tsuā (Kurayoshi-hen)" (Japanese: 鳥取砂丘ミステリーツアー（倉吉編）)	Keiya Saito	Nobuo Ogizawa	November 28, 2015
During a visit to the Tottori Sand Dunes, Kogoro, Conan and Ran come across a case. Shuko, wife of the Kumado family's eldest son, was attacked and tied up during a home invasion robbery, and the family's heirloom incense burner was stolen. A pedant found at the crime scene casts suspicion on the family's former housekeeper Naomi Senda, but Kogoro and his family saw her at the sand museum at the time of the crime. Later, head of the household Isao Kumado receives an e-mail on his phone demanding 10 million yen in exchange for the incense burner. Kogoro suspects the crime was committed by a family member who was trying to frame Naomi, so he investigates the Kumado family's alibis.
802	24	"Tottori Sand Dunes Mystery Tour (Tottori Part)"; Transliteration: "Tottori Sakyū Misuterī Tsuā (Tottori-hen)" (Japanese: 鳥取砂丘ミステリーツアー（鳥取編）)	Makiko Hayase	Nobuo Ogizawa	December 5, 2015
As the incident starts to develop in a strange way, Conan decides to find out the truth behind the strange theft and ransom demand.
803	25	"The Pitfall of Fire Precautions"; Transliteration: "Hi-no-Yōjin no Otoshiana" (Japanese: 火の用心の落とし穴)	Koichiro Kuroda	Junichi Miyashita	December 12, 2015
Arsons have been occurring at different children's playgrounds. The Detective Boys, accompanied by firefighters, go on a fire safety patrol. A man is seen running past them toward the direction of a fire and Genta knows who he is. The Detective Boys try to find evidences to prove that the man is the arsonist.
804	26	"Conan and Ebizō's Kabuki Jūhachiban Mystery (Part 1)"; Transliteration: "Konan to Ebizō Kabuki Jūhachiban Misuterī (Zenpen)" (Japanese: コナンと海老蔵 歌舞伎十八番ミステリー（前編）)	Hajime Kamegaki	Hiroshi Kashiwabara	January 9, 2016 (Note: The episodes were aired as a single hour long episode in Japan.)
This two episodes were aired in honor for 20th anniversary of the Detective Conan anime. A murder case with the world of kabuki, a famous Japanese theater in Tokyo, as its stage, and a deduction showdown between Ichikawa Ebizō XI, a real life famous kabuki theater actor, and Conan, after they find a dead body in a car.
805	27	"Conan and Ebizō's Kabuki Jūhachiban Mystery (Part 2)"; Transliteration: "Konan to Ebizō Kabuki Jūhachiban Misuterī (Kōhen)" (Japanese: コナンと海老蔵 歌舞伎十八番ミステリー（後編）)	Yasuichiro Yamamoto	Hiroshi Kashiwabara	January 16, 2016
As Conan continues his investigation, he is kidnapped and left unconsciousness in an abandoned building that will soon be demolished.
806	28	"The Ventriloquist's Illusion (Part 1)"; Transliteration: "Fukuwajutsushi no Sakkaku (Zenpen)" (Japanese: 腹話術師の錯覚（前編）)	Akira Yoshimura	Junichi Miyashita	January 30, 2016
Riichi Tengan, a popular ventriloquist, has hallucinations that his doll wants him to kill his wife, Kazuko, so he asks Kogoro for help, but Kogoro turns him down. A few days later, Tengan's apprentice calls Kogoro and tells him that Kazuko has been murdered.
807	29	"The Ventriloquist's Illusion (Part 2)"; Transliteration: "Fukuwajutsushi no Sakkaku (Kōhen)" (Japanese: 腹話術師の錯覚（後編）)	Takanori Yano	Junichi Miyashita	February 6, 2016
Conan finds a few more clues and manages to pinpoint who the real culprit is.
808	30	"The Kamaitachi Inn (Part 1)"; Transliteration: "Kamaitachi no Yado (Zenpen)" (Japanese: かまいたちの宿（前編）)	Minoru Tozawa	N/A	February 13, 2016
Conan, Ran, Kogoro, Heiji and Kazuka visit an inn deep in the mountains of Nagano. Heiji acquires a photo of a figure carrying a scythe running across the surface of the inn's outdoor bath. Conan and his friends have come to investigate the identity of this figure who resembles a kamaitachi, a supernatural demon. At the inn they meet writers Daigo Nakama and Midori Koyanagi, who have come to gather information on the incident as well. While searching inside a dark storehouse, Heiji, Kogoro and Koyanagi are attacked.
809	31	"The Kamaitachi Inn (Part 2)"; Transliteration: "Kamaitachi no Yado (Kōhen)" (Japanese: かまいたちの宿（後編）)	Keiya Saito	N/A	February 20, 2016
As incidents thought to be the work of the kamaitachi demon occur one after another, the innkeeper's father-in-law, Bonzo Ohno, is murdered in the annex of the inn. Based on the crime scene, Heiji believes the culprit came to the annex through the outdoor bath. However, the snow around the bath is undisturbed, meaning the culprit could only have run across the bath's surface. After hearing everyone's testimony, Conan and Heiji realize who the culprit is from a casual remark.
810	32	"The Darkness of the Prefectural Police (Part 1)"; Transliteration: "Kenkei no Kuroi Yami (Zenpen)" (Japanese: 県警の黒い闇（前編）)	Nobuharu Kamanaka	N/A	February 27, 2016
Kogoro, Conan, and Ran are visiting Nagano Prefecture when they run into Inspector Yamato and his associates of the Nagano Prefectural Police. Conan and his friends visit the Kansuke Shrine ruins and Yamamoto Kansuke's grave. While visiting the Chikumagawa River, their final destination, Inspector Shigeru Takeda's severed head is found in the river. On the body's forehead is a mark resembling a woodpecker's footprint. Allegedly, a mysterious group known as the Woodpecker Society exists in the Nagano Prefectural Police. Yamato and his associates search for someone who may have borne a grudge against Takeda when two cases involving Takeda resurface.
811	33	"The Darkness of the Prefectural Police (Part 2)"; Transliteration: "Kenkei no Kuroi Yami (Chūhen)" (Japanese: 県警の黒い闇 (中編))	Koichiro Kuroda	N/A	March 5, 2016
Police Lt. Shoji Kano is found dead in his home. From the body's condition, Inspector Morofushi reasons that after being strangled, Kano was hung from the ceiling. Later, the culprit sends an e-mail declaring that he will kill three additional people. Sgt. Shinsuke Akiyama is called to Mt. Saijozan by the culprit and is murdered. Inspector Yamato's fingerprints are found on the rope that was wrapped around Kano's neck, so Section One Chief Kuroda puts out a BOLO for Yamato as the suspect.
812	34	"The Darkness of the Prefectural Police (Part 3)"; Transliteration: "Kenkei no Kuroi Yami (Kōhen)" (Japanese: 県警の黒い闇（後編）)	Akira Yoshimura	N/A	March 12, 2016
Conan discovers what the Woodpocker Society is and the identity of the murderer.
813	35	"The Shadow Approaching Amuro"; Transliteration: "Amuro ni Shinobiyoru Kage" (Japanese: 安室に忍びよる影)	Takanori Yano	Takeharu Sakurai	April 16, 2016
A pre-story for the Detective Conan: The Darkest Nightmare. One morning, Conan notices a suspicious man watching Officer Rei Furuya at the Café Poirot. The man appears on Conan's way home again. Mitsuhiko, Genta and Ayumi begin to follow him, but he disappears in a shopping street. Conan asks Rei about the man. Rei was stalked by the man three days ago. Conan thinks that he perhaps is a Black Organization member or a Security Bureau officer.
814	36	"The Actress Blogger's Locked Room Case (Part 1)"; Transliteration: "Burogu Joyū no Misshitsu Jiken (Zenpen)" (Japanese: ブログ女優の密室事件（前編）)	Minoru Tozawa	N/A	April 23, 2016
Professor Agasa takes the Detective Boys to a cake buffet in a hotel, where they meet Saya Kitami and Kyona Shono, two rival actresses who are filming a drama. Kyona asks Saya if she's seen her blog and warns her that she should surrender if she doesn't want to have her secret exposed. Conan checks Kyona's blog but is unable to determine what the secret is. Later, Kyona is found murdered in her locked hotel room.
815	37	"The Actress Blogger's Locked Room Case (Part 2)"; Transliteration: "Burogu Joyū no Misshitsu Jiken (Kōhen)" (Japanese: ブログ女優の密室事件（後編）)	Makiko Hayase	N/A	April 30, 2016
Conan discovers the secret of the locked room.
816	38	"The Disappointing and Kind Alien"; Transliteration: "Zan'nen de Yasashii Uchūjin" (Japanese: 残念でやさしい宇宙人)	Yoshio Suzuki	Nobuo Ogizawa	May 7, 2016
Unemployed man Hanzaki Yasuo slips and falls to his death after he sees office worker Takedera Hitoshi wearing an alien costume. After questioning Takedera's three acquaintances who witnessed the incident, the Detective Boys investigate and close in on the truth.
817	39	"The Missing Fiancée"; Transliteration: "Kieta Fianse" (Japanese: 消えたフィアンセ)	Koichiro Kuroda	Nobuo Ogizawa	May 14, 2016
A man comes to Kogoro for him in locating his missing fiancée. Kogoro narrows down the list of suspects, but Conan believes that the case was too easy to resolve.

== Home media release ==
Shogakukan/Being (Japan, Region 2 DVD)
Volume	Episodes^{Jp.}	Release date	Ref.
Volume 1	779-783	January 27, 2017	
Volume 2	784-786, 789	February 24, 2017	
Volume 3	787-788, 790-791	March 24, 2017	
Volume 4	792-795	April 21, 2017	
Volume 5	796-799	May 26, 2017	
Volume 6	800-803	June 23, 2017	
Volume 7	804-805	July 21, 2017	
Volume 8	806-809	August 25, 2017	
Volume 9	810-813	September 22, 2017	
Volume 10	814-817	November 24, 2017	
