= Case Closed season 24 =

Season of television series

Case Closed
- Season 24
- The cover of the first DVD compilation for season twenty-four of Detective Conan released by Shogakukan
- No. of episodes: 39

Release
- Original network: NNS (ytv)
- Original release: May 31, 2014 – May 16, 2015

Season chronology
- ← Previous; Season 23 Next → Season 25

The twenty-fourth season of the Case Closed anime was directed by Yasuichiro Yamamoto and produced by TMS Entertainment and Yomiuri Telecasting Corporation. The series is based on Gosho Aoyama's Case Closed manga series. In Japan, the series is titled Meitantei Conan (名探偵コナン, lit. Great Detective Conan, officially translated as Detective Conan) but was changed due to legal issues with the title Detective Conan. The series focuses on the adventures of teenage detective Shinichi Kudo who was turned into a child by a poison called APTX 4869, but continues working as a detective under the alias Conan Edogawa.

The episodes use seven pieces of theme music: four openings and three endings. The first opening is "Butterfly Core" by Valshe for episodes 740–743. the second opening theme is "Greed" by Knock Out Monkey used from episode 744 until episode 756. The third opening is "DYNAMITE" by Mai Kuraki and was used until episode 773. The fourth opening is "WE GO" by Breakerz, starting from episode 774. The first ending theme is "Rain Man" by Akihide used for episodes 740–749. The second ending theme is Muteki na Heart (無敵なハート, lit."Invincible Heart") by Mai Kuraki, starting from episode 750 and was used until episode 762. The third ending theme is Kimi e no Uso (君への嘘, lit."Lie to You") by Valshe, starting from episode 763.

The season initially ran from May 31, 2014, through May 16, 2015, on Nippon Television Network System in Japan. The season was later collected and released in ten DVD compilations by Shogakukan between January 22, 2016, and November 25, 2016, in Japan. Crunchyroll began simulcasting the series in October 2014, starting with episode 754.

== Episode list ==
No.	No. in season	Title	Directed by	Written by	Original air date
740	1	"Bathroom Where Ran Collapsed As Well (Part 1)"; Transliteration: "Ran mo Taoreta Basurūmu (Zenpen)" (Japanese: 蘭も倒れたバスルーム（前編）)	Takanori Yano	N/A	May 31, 2014
As Conan and Ran are waiting for a meeting with Eri, they meet Sera, who is investigating Rumi Kitao's boyfriend, Kenya Settsu, about adultery. Thinking that Kenya will make a move upon seeing Ran, Sera has Conan and Ran approach the couple upon the pretense of needing a meal. However, Kenya doesn't seem to be interested in Ran and asks Ran to accompany Rumi to wake Waka, Kenya's ex-girlfriend. Rumi and Ran has to open Waka's apartment with a key when no one answers. Later, Ran finds Waka on the bathroom floor, but she collapses herself due to chloroform in the air.
741	2	"Bathroom Where Ran Collapsed As Well (Part 2)"; Transliteration: "Ran mo Taoreta Basurūmu (Kōhen)" (Japanese: 蘭も倒れたバスルーム（後編）)	Minoru Tozawa	N/A	June 7, 2014
Conan saves Ran and decided to find out the culprit behind it.
742	3	"Promise with a J-Leaguer"; Transliteration: "J Rīgā to no Yakusoku" (Japanese: Jリーガーとの約束)	Kenichi Takeshita	Kazunari Kōchi	June 14, 2014
While practicing penalty kicks, Sanada's soccer ball accidentally hits Kou while he's riding his bike past the park, injuring Kou's ankle. Kou is upset and makes Sanada promise to play his next match and score a goal using his right leg.
743	4	"Two Coincidental Successes"; Transliteration: "Gūzen wa ni Tabikasanaru" (Japanese: 偶然は二度重なる)	Koichiro Kuroda	Tatsuro Inamoto	June 21, 2014
Ran is almost attacked by "The Hooded Man" after staying late at school for her extracurricular activities, but defends herself. A scream is heard and Conan correctly deduces the man to be the aforementioned criminal who is arrested. They manage to save his latest victim, Mizuki Tachibana, but her friend, Yoko Katsuragi, is found bludgeoned to death, allegedly by the same man. He denies involvement but the similarities in the previous cases are too great to ignore. After finding unusual clues, Conan puts Kogoro to sleep to reveal that Mizuki killed Yoko. Mizuki was attacked by the Hooded Man but saw it as an opportunity to frame him for Yoko's murder. As evidence, Mizuki has been followed by Ran for majority of the time; she didn't have time to dispose of the clothes and weapon used in the crime, meaning she is still in possession of them. Mizuki confesses that Yoko took everything, including her boyfriend, from her.
744	5	"The Suspect is Makoto Kyogoku (Part 1)"; Transliteration: "Yōgisha ka Kyōgoku Makoto (Zenpen)" (Japanese: 容疑者か京極真（前編）)	Shiro Izumi	N/A	June 28, 2014
Deciding to go bowling after they are rained out for tennis, Ran, Sonoko, Masumi and Conan are met by Makoto, who engages Sera in a fight after mistaking her for a boy interested in Sonoko. After this is straightened out, we learn that he was attacked by teacher Masahiro Tanba, who was drunk. His coworker Sunami Masaki took him to the car to calm down. Makoto soon leaves to nap in the car, not finding bowling to be his strong suit. After a while, math teacher Michiko Monna becomes worried about Tanba, and in going to check on him, finds him missing. They all check around the local bars, but the missing teacher is found drowned in a portable toilet, and Makoto becomes the prime suspect due to the strength required for such a feat. He also had the opportunity, remaining in the parking lot during the estimated time of death.
745	6	"The Suspect is Makoto Kyogoku (Part 2)"; Transliteration: "Yōgisha ka Kyōgoku Makoto (Kōhen)" (Japanese: 容疑者か京極真（後編）)	Akira Yoshimura	N/A	July 5, 2014
Conan and Sera are going to clear Makoto as the suspect and find out the true murderer.
746	7	"Kaito Kid VS Makoto Kyogoku (Part 1)"; Transliteration: "Kaitō Kiddo VS Kyōgoku Makoto (Zenpen)" (Japanese: 怪盗キッドVS 京極真（前編）)	Takanori Yano	N/A	July 19, 2014
Sonoko has decided to introduce Makoto to her parents. Her father approves of Makoto but her mother doesn't. Makoto is going to prove himself by protecting the jewel which is the target of Kaitou Kid.
747	8	"Kaito Kid VS Makoto Kyogoku (Part 2)"; Transliteration: "Kaitō Kiddo VS Kyōgoku Makoto (Kōhen)" (Japanese: 怪盗キッドVS 京極真（後編）)	Minoru Tozawa	N/A	July 26, 2014
Kaitou Kid appears but he failed and gave the jewel back to Makoto as Makoto desperation to protect the jewel has led Kaitou Kid to surrender (although the jewel is not the one Kaitou Kid wants).
748	9	"Metropolitan Police Detective Love Story 9 (Confession)"; Transliteration: "Honchō no Keiji Koi Monogatari Kyū (Kokuhaku)" (Japanese: 本庁の刑事恋物語9（告白）)	Koichiro Kuroda	N/A	August 2, 2014
A man was found dead in an apartment.
749	10	"Metropolitan Police Detective Love Story 9 (Truth)"; Transliteration: "Honchō no Keiji Koi Monogatari Kyū (Shinsō)" (Japanese: 本庁の刑事恋物語9（真相）)	Akira Yoshimura	N/A	August 9, 2014
Conan, Detective Takagi and Detective Sato are solving the mystery of the murder and tries to deduce who is murderer.
750	11	"The Man Who Was Betrayed by the Sea"; Transliteration: "Umi ni Uragirareta Otoko" (Japanese: 海に裏切られた男)	Taichi Atarashi	Toyoto Kogiso	September 6, 2014
When Koutarou jumped into the ocean he suddenly was unable to swim and began drowning, eventually passing away at the hospital.
751	12	"The Case of the Lucky Calico (Part 1)"; Transliteration: "Maneki Mikeneko no Jiken (Zenpen)" (Japanese: 招き三毛猫の事件（前編）)	Takanori Yano	N/A	September 20, 2014
Three different people have come forward claiming Taii belongs to them. Now it's up to the group to determine who is telling the truth.
752	13	"The Case of the Lucky Calico (Part 2)"; Transliteration: "Maneki Mikeneko no Jiken (Kōhen)" (Japanese: 招き三毛猫の事件（後編）)	Minoru Tozawa	N/A	September 27, 2014
After unlocking the door, Conan runs into the bedroom to find Teishi barely breathing after apparently falling off a chair and hitting his head while fixing a light, but something doesn't seem quite right.
753	14	"The Blind Spot in the Share House"; Transliteration: "Shea Hausu no Shikaku" (Japanese: シェアハウスの死角)	Koichiro Kuroda	Koshiro Mikami	October 4, 2014
Ran visits her former school friend who now lives in a shared apartment house that goes by a bunch of scheduled rules. When Kogoro and Conan arrive to pick her up, one of the housemates is found dead on her bed, and suspicion is placed on the sole male housemate who had argued with her earlier.
754	15	"The Tragedy of the Red Woman (Steam)"; Transliteration: "Akai Onna no Sangeki (Yukemuri)" (Japanese: 赤い女の惨劇（湯煙）)	Akira Yoshimura	N/A	October 11, 2014
Conan, Ran, Sonoko and Masumi are walking through the woods to a villa where Masumi's brother was called to investigate the mysterious Red Woman, a person who is reputed to be haunting the area. They meet with a group of friends, Tamami Minegishi, Sumika Kawana, Masaie Hakuya, and Jinsuke Ninda who are there at to the villa to pay respects to their friend Satoko. It is believed that Satoko was murdered by the Red Woman after her corpse was pulled from the nearby swamp. They describe how every year they had experienced strange events related to the Red Woman such as a window breaking and a room with red apples, a water heater filled with red rose petals, and a big splotch of red paint on their door. Conan asks about the Red Woman and the group reveals that, 15 years ago, she viciously stabbed her husband to death to the point that everything in the room was bloody red, thus earning her the ominous nickname. A police officer stumbled onto the horrific aftermath of the incident and was slashed during the Red Woman's escape; she was never apprehended and is still at large. The Red Woman appears in the woods as Ran, Sonoko, and the rest of the group split off to do house chores. When Ran, Sonoko, and Sumika go to take a bath, they discover Hakuya's corpse in a bath full of tomatoes.
755	16	"The Tragedy of the Red Woman (Evil Spirit)"; Transliteration: "Akai Onna no Sangeki (Akurei)" (Japanese: 赤い女の惨劇（悪霊）)	Taichi Atarashi	N/A	October 18, 2014
The investigation of Hakuya's murder is led by Yui Uehara, Taka'aki Morofushi, and Kansuke Yamato of the Nagano Prefectural Police Department. Hakuya bashed the back of his head, fell in the tub after losing consciousness and drowned. The discoloration of the bath water is due to the bath salts. Alibis and suspect whereabouts are taken; Tamami was preparing dinner, Sumika was vacuuming rooms and Jinsuke went shopping. Blame is shifted onto the Red Woman, but Yui explains that a second body was found in the swamp after their friend Satoko was found dead. Through DNA analysis, they've discovered that the body belongs to original Red Woman, real name Komayo Takeno. Her victim and cheating husband's surname is Takeno. Also worthy of note is the fan in Sumika's room. Conan and Masumi discover who the killer is but a blackout occurs and Sumika is attacked, allegedly by the Red Woman. Panic sets in but Masumi seizes control. More of Masumi's background is revealed as Conan watches with caution.
756	17	"The Tragedy of the Red Woman (Revenge)"; Transliteration: "Akai Onna no Sangeki (Fukushū)" (Japanese: 赤い女の惨劇（復讐）)	Nobuharu Kamanaka	N/A	October 25, 2014
Although Sumika's attack is looked at, Conan and Masumi are not deterred from their conclusion and proceed with the investigation. They reveal that Sumika killed Hakuya. The pair reveal that Sumika bludgeoned Hakuya with the dumbbell and submerged his body in the bath water, killing him. She covered his corpse with tomatoes that sank to the bottom, then used her fan and a bat to simulate the sounds of a vacuum cleaner. With witnesses present, Sumika sprinkled bath salt in the tub, causing the tomatoes to rise to the surface which eventually reveals his body. As evidence, Masumi reveals that Sumika was the woman in red who handed out photos to investigate, mistaking her for a male. Sumika confesses stating Hakuya asked Satoko to play as the Red Woman for a prank, however, she fell into the swamp and drowned whilst Hakuya did nothing to save her. The Red Woman appears again and tried to attack Sumika but she is apprehended by Taka'aki. The Nagano police extend their deepest apologies to Shinobu Kagawa for allowing her to search for the Red Woman not releasing she was already dead. Both Shinobu and Sumika are taken away by the police. After the case, Conan notices a photo of Masumi and a young girl on her phone.
757	18	"The Comedian Who Turned Himself In (Part 1)"; Transliteration: "Jishu Shita Owarai Geinin (Zenpen)" (Japanese: 自首したお笑い芸人（前編）)	Takanori Yano	Nobuo Ogizawa	November 1, 2014
After an unlucky visit to the Pachinko parlor, Kogoro finds Conan at a small police box near a train station. A well-known comedian named Rokusuke Dodonpa turns himself in after he confesses to allegedly murdering production office manager Hideki Tendou. The following investigation shows Hideki was killed with a blow to the head at 9AM. Although Dodonpa takes responsibility, he has an alibi as he was returning art books and conversing with a friend named Izumi Suda who owns a clock on her wall. Conan questions Izumi and she recalls falling asleep during her talk with Dodonpa, which Conan finds suspicious. Across town, as Dodonpa pulls out his cigarettes, he drops a packet of tissues from a pachinko hall, which startles him for some unknown reason. With only a little information to work with, Conan wonders if Dodonpa is really innocent or if something more is in the works.
758	19	"The Comedian Who Turned Himself In (Part 2)"; Transliteration: "Jishu Shita Owarai Geinin (Kōhen)" (Japanese: 自首したお笑い芸人（後編）)	Minoru Tozawa	Nobuo Ogizawa	November 8, 2014
Continuing with the investigation, Conan meets a man who offers them tissues from a pachinko hall, stating that the entrance is free. Conan asks him if he gave out the same tissues yesterday, to which he replies that he did at around 10 AM and had given them to a celebrity. With this new information, Conan summons Megure and Dodonpa, puts Kogoro to sleep, and reveals that Dodonpa really murdered his boss, Hideki. Dodonpa turned himself in and confessed to the murder he truly committed in the hopes that the ensuring investigation would prove he had an alibi and would be knocked off the suspect list. He drugged Izumi and threw off her sense of time by messing with her clock. He would go on but was stopped by the panchiko hall promoter who gave him tissues, then murdered his boss as planned. As evidence, the panchinko hall promoter's fingerprints are on the art books that Dodonpa returned to Izumi, effectively putting Dodonpa in the vicinity of the crime scene. Dodonpa gleefully admits his guilt stating he's done nothing wrong. Megure snaps in anger and reminds him of the severity of his actions, which Dodonpa now regrets as he is arrested for murder.
759	20	"The Romance Novel with the Unexpected Conclusion (Part 1)"; Transliteration: "Igai na Kekka no Ren'ai Shōsetsu (Zenpen)" (Japanese: 意外な結果の恋愛小説（前編）)	Koichiro Kuroda	N/A	November 22, 2014
Conan, Sonoko and Ran visit Masumi's place, which is a room in a hotel. They meet a romance novelist who is planning on finishing the writing of one of his serials of which a group of editors are eagerly awaiting. He challenges the editors to eat a bunch of food prepared for them with whoever eats the most getting the author's attention to finishing their manuscript. However, later on the author's assistant is found dead in her room one floor below.
760	21	"The Romance Novel with the Unexpected Conclusion (Part 2)"; Transliteration: "Igai na Kekka no Ren'ai Shōsetsu (Kōhen)" (Japanese: 意外な結果の恋愛小説（後編）)	Akira Yoshimura	N/A	November 29, 2014
Conan and Masumi suspect the novelist is the culprit to the murder of his assistant.
761	22	"Kaga Hyakumangoku Mystery Tour (Kanazawa Part)"; Transliteration: "Kaga Hyakumangoku Misuterī Tsuā (Kanazawa-hen)" (Japanese: 加賀百万石ミステリーツアー（金沢編）)	Yoko Fukushima	Atsushi Maekawa	December 6, 2014
Conan, Ran and Kogoro visit the city of Kanazawa where Kogoro has been asked to provide a story for the city's Kaga-Hyakumangoku mystery tour. They participate in a scavenger hunt for clues which lead them to all sorts of sightseeing spots around the city. Along the way, Kogoro, Conan, and Ran notice a young couple that seems to visit the same places they are, as well as a purse snatcher that Kogoro was able to stop, appearing at a later site. It is revealed that the tour hosts were trying to get video footage of Kogoro and company to help promotions, and the couple and the purse snatcher and victim were all actors. However, at Kanazawa Castle, one of the actors is soon found assaulted for real.
762	23	"Kaga Hyakumangoku Mystery Tour (Kaga Part)"; Transliteration: "Kaga Hyakumangoku Misuterī Tsuā (Kaga-hen)" (Japanese: 加賀百万石ミステリーツアー（加賀編）)	Nobuharu Kamanaka	Atsushi Maekawa	December 13, 2014
Conan tries to find out the culprit behind the attempted murder of Harumi. Ran is sent to join Harumi to the hospital, while the others continue on the tour. Conan discovers that Harumi had actually had the original clues stashed in her bag, and pretends to voice Kogoro in telling Ran to help him. Ran informs everyone that Harumi has escaped from the hospital, so the group splits up to look for her. The culprit tries to attack Harumi, but it is Ran is disguise, and the suspect is revealed to be her fiance, who had been involved in the theft of five million yen four years ago.
763	24	"Conan and Heiji, Code of Love (Part 1)"; Transliteration: "Conan to Heiji Koi no Angō (Zenpen)" (Japanese: コナンと平次 恋の暗号（前編）)	Minoru Tozawa	N/A	January 10, 2015
Conan, Ai and the Detective Boys bump into a drug dealer on the run. The drug dealer loses his notebook and Conan finds that there's a code inside about a drug exchange which is going to take place that same day. In order to stop it, they'll first need to solve the code and find the location and exact time of drug deal. The Detective Boys contact Heiji and they determine that the code is connected to the train networks for both of their cities.
764	25	"Conan and Heiji, Code of Love (Part 2)"; Transliteration: "Conan to Heiji Koi no Angō (Kōhen)" (Japanese: コナンと平次 恋の暗号（後編）)	Takanori Yano	N/A	January 17, 2015
With the help of Heiji, Conan and the Junior Detectives found out that the drug exchange is going to take place in Osaka, and that the suspect will be carrying a white rose. Heiji goes to the spot and finds three possible suspects, which Heiji uses his phone camera to show the kids. However, one of the suspects is acting awfully friendly and chatty to Kazuha who happens to be in the area, and Heiji becomes infuriated.
765	26	"Teimuzu River Kite Flying Case (Part 1)"; Transliteration: "Teimuzu-gawa Takoage Jiken (Zenpen)" (Japanese: 堤無津川凧揚げ事件（前編）)	Koichiro Kuroda	N/A	January 24, 2015
The Detective Boys participate in a kite competition, hoping to advertise their business. Ai hums a tune that gets the others curious as to what she is listening to, but she says that's a secret, challenging Conan to try to figure it out. Conan plans to have Ayumi try to record it, but she accidentally reveals to Ai the trick but then realizes she had lost her phone. During the competition, one of the guys who had attracted trouble with some of his associates as well as his wife is backing up while holding a kite, but falls over a high ledge into a river where he nearly drowns. Conan and the kids suspect foul play, especially when they discover the lengths of the rope barrier do not match.
766	27	"Teimuzu River Kite Flying Case (Part 2)"; Transliteration: "Teimuzu-gawa Takoage Jiken (Kōhen)" (Japanese: 堤無津川凧揚げ事件（後編）)	Akira Yoshimura	N/A	January 31, 2015
Conan and the Detective Boys are trying to deduce the culprit behind the murder of Renno.
767	28	"The Lover Gone Missing in a Snowstorm"; Transliteration: "Fubuki ni Kieta Koibito" (Japanese: 吹雪に消えた恋人)	Daisuke Takashima	Tatsuro Inamoto	February 7, 2015
The Detective Boys arrive at The Ice Room boarding house with Professor Agasa. While the Detective Boys play start a snow fight, Genta retreats inside the boarding house to clean his face. Conan, while looking for Genta, accidentally overhears an argument between Juri Himuro, Aya Himuro and Masahiko Fujita. Aya protests against Juri having Masahiko as a boyfriend. After they all leave, Conan finds Genta coming out of the kitchen instead of the restroom. Haibara in the meantime has been making miniature snow animals sculptures. While they all return after playing, Aya calls out to them, as she is returning from the narrow mountain path. During dinner, Ayumi is put off by the scent of garlic. This causes Conan to wonder because none of the food should have garlic as ingredient. After dinner Aya reminds Juri to take her medicine, but it's disappeared. Masahiko offers to get it from the hospital, even though there's a snowstorm. After a while, a phone call comes from the hospital saying that he hasn't been there. Everyone begins to worry. Juri rings his mobile but he doesn't answer. Everyone (excluding Juri) goes out searching for him. Masahiko's car is still parked and they deduce he must have walked to the hospital by taking the narrow, faster path. Conan discovers his corpse off the narrow path and it seems like he slipped and fell to his death. The police are unable to come because of the snowstorm, but Conan preserves the scene. Professor Agasa thinks it's an accident but Conan wonders why Masahiko chose a dangerous path during a snowstorm, but the sisters tell him its faster to reach the hospital that way while walking. He finds some fragments of something shiny in the snow. Conan asks Aya if she went to town this afternoon since they saw her coming from there. When back in the lodge, Juri breaks down and blames herself. That night, as Conan is thinking while sitting on the steps, he hears a door squeak open. He discovers 'Monaka ice' in the store room. He then hears Juri suffering from a coughing bout and asks her if her sisters would do anything for her. The detective boys bring in the animal ice sculptures that Haibara had made. Conan places all the tricks together and with Agasa's help, enacts the denouement scene.
768	29	"Ai Haibara Imprisonment Case"; Transliteration: "Haibara Ai Kankin Jiken" (Japanese: 灰原哀監禁事件)	Nobuharu Kamanaka	Masaki Tsuji	February 21, 2015
The Detective Boys are wandering the streets in the residential area around Professor Agasa's house, worrying about Ai Haibara, who has gone missing since she went shopping several hours ago. At first, Genta, Mitsuhiko and Ayumi are wondering whether Ai has become the victim of a traffic accident, but then Conan finds a cat's shawl lying on the street. Seeing this, he remembers how he, Ai and the Professor recently met a friendly young woman named Mitsuru Higaki, along with her pet cat Chiro (who wore the shawl) and her Indian Star Tortoise. Searching the vicinity for Chiro, they find the kitten inside a well in a park, but as they try to return it, Mrs. Higaki does not answer the doorbell, so they take the cat back to Agasa's house to feed it. After contacting Detective Chiba to learn whether there have been any accidents in the area (none have), Conan tries to contact Ai through her badge, but to no avail. And it's no small wonder, since at that very moment Haibara awakes to find both herself and Mrs. Higaki inside a darkened living room, solidly tied and gagged! As soon as her situation becomes clear and she has realized that she has been out for five hours, Ai remembers how she came by after concluding her shopping and spotted Chiro struggling with his shawl, which was wrapped around the leg of a telephone table. When she attempted to free the kitten, she was suddenly grabbed from behind and chloroformed, never getting a chance to see her attacker's face. Then she notices that the TV set in the room is running on silent mode, in which a newsflash appears that announces the murder of Naoshi Higaki, Mrs. Higaki's husband!
769	30	"The Troublesome Emergency Patient"; Transliteration: "Mendōna Kyūkyū Kanja" (Japanese: 面倒な救急患者)	Minoru Tozawa	Junichi Miyashita	February 28, 2015
A man running away from a police officer stumbles into the Detective Boys, grabs Ayumi as a hostage but collapses. They see a big wound on the back of his head and move him to Beika Hospital. He has no identifying papers on him, only a torn piece of magazine paper, seeing which, the police decide that he was attacked and decide to protect him. The doctor who comes out of the surgery starts acting suspicious when he hears Mauri's name. Conan and the Detective Boys track back the places the man has been to – realizing he had the wound for quite a while – and finally find themselves at the backside of Beika Hospital.
770	31	"The Tense Tea Party (Part 1)"; Transliteration: "Gisugisu Shita Ochakai (Zenpen)" (Japanese: ギスギスしたお茶会（前編）)	Takanori Yano	N/A	March 7, 2015
Ran, Kogoro and Conan are at the hospital where Eri has had appendix surgery. While coming out, Kogoro and Conan run into Amuro and they find a woman dead from poisoning. They figure out that the woman, Reina, was visiting a sick friend Juri, and they were having tea party with two more friends. The police interrogates each of the suspects, which reveals their possible motive; Tokie's former boyfriend was stolen by Reina and became her current husband, Katsuki lost large amount of money because of the stock that Reina recommended, and Juri's son failed an exam because he caught a cold from Reina's son. The three of them denies wanting to kill the victim, since it is not possible to switch a teacup with different colors of tea to poison her.
771	32	"The Tense Tea Party (Part 2)"; Transliteration: "Gisugisu Shita Ochakai (Kōhen)" (Japanese: ギスギスしたお茶会（後編）)	Koichiro Kuroda	N/A	March 14, 2015
Poison is soon found – its only on Reina's teacup and only where the lips were. As Ran comes to pick him up, she tells him 'its time for kids to go to bed when the color of the skies changes from blue to red'. This makes Conan realize who the culprit is and what the trick used was.
772	33	"Shinichi Kudō Aquarium Case (Part 1)"; Transliteration: "Kudō Shin'ichi Suizokukan Jiken (Zenpen)" (Japanese: 工藤新一水族館事件（前編）)	Akira Yoshimura	N/A	March 21, 2015
Ran, Conan and Detective Boys are visiting the Beika Aquarium. They finish watching the dolphin show, while everyone wonders why Professor Agasa is so late. Conan presumes that Professor Agasa was eating yagisoban hamburger near the parking lot. The Detective boys are hungry as well, and decide they want something to eat. Ran tells everyone, that the Beika Aquarim has a Cafe that offers a lot of sweat looking food and desserts. The Detective Boys wonder why Ran would know a lot about Cafe, so Ayumi presumes that Ran always visited the place for a date. Ran tells them that she didn't date with anyone, just visited it with someone together. While Ran is looking at shark, she starts thinking about an old story, back when Ran and Shinichi visited the Beika Aquarium. Ran questions if Shinichi liked her at that time already as much as he does now. Conan's guess proves true, it turns out Professor Agasa was indeed eating yagisoban hamburger. Conan also starts remembering the day back when Ran and him, as Shinichi, visited the place... Shinichi was waiting for Ran inside Beika Aquarium. Ran was late. She tells him that she planned to invite her mother and father to visit the Aquarium for romantic situation. Shinichi tells Ran not to run, but Ran asked why, Shinichi though didn't answer her. While Shinichi and Ran were talking, he spots the dead body of Kunihiro Shumoto. Many bystander bearing witness to the corpse laying close to one of the Aquariums. Shinichi manages to narrow down the suspects to three people by looking up the phone call list of the victim's mobile. The first was Kanoko Nakagiri, who was the victim's current girlfriend, Naho Ojiro, his former girlfriend, and Naho's new boyfriend Koudai Jinbe, were also under suspicion.
773	34	"Shinichi Kudō Aquarium Case (Part 2)"; Transliteration: "Kudō Shin'ichi Suizokukan Jiken (Kōhen)" (Japanese: 工藤新一水族館事件（後編）)	Nobuharu Kamanaka	N/A	March 28, 2015
Shinichi participates in the interrogation of the suspects. They each show a video that they have taken in the aquarium. From this and from their behavior, Shinichi determines who the culprit is.
774	35	"Munch's Missing Scream"; Transliteration: "Kieta Munku no Sakebi" (Japanese: 消えたムンクの叫び)	Minoru Tozawa	Takeharu Sakurai	April 18, 2015
Ran and Conan accompany Jirokichi Suzuki to Narita Airport to wait for the arrival of Munch's "Anxiety" and "Despair". Before and after packing, photos are taken to check the authenticity. These two paintings were checked to have no defects, so they were packed and transferred to Suzuki Museum by a truck. The three of them get in a car and follow the truck. Meanwhile, Munch's "Scream" arrived at Haneda Airport, and after it was checked to have no problems using the photos, it was sent to the museum by another truck. However, Hiroshi Numajiri tells Jirokichi that the truck carrying "Scream" drove off course and disappeared.
775	36	"The Manipulated Great Detective (Part 1)"; Transliteration: "Ayatsurareta Meitantei (Zenpen)" (Japanese: あやつられた名探偵（前編）)	Makiko Hayase	N/A	April 25, 2015
Kogoro Mouri is asked to infiltrate a robber group. However, his identity is discovered by Mr. Head, the boss of the group. Mr. Head requests Kogoro to find the one who killed his son among the group members. If he doesn't do it or if he calls the police, then Ran will be killed. Conan quickly follows the robbers and Kogoro through the sewer system, using shortcut to get ahead of them. After reaching the exit, he hides in Miss Lip's car. Soon enough, the robbers and Kogoro exit the tunnel and get on the car and drive off as they're chased by the police. Using her ungodly driving skill, Miss Lip successfully causes all the police cars, among them Megure and Chiba, to crash. She also notice that the car's back weight strange, and cause the robbers to discover Conan hiding in it. Meanwhile at the Agency, Ran receives a call from the police, with someone spying on her from afar...
776	37	"The Manipulated Great Detective (Part 2)"; Transliteration: "Ayatsurareta Meitantei (Kōhen)" (Japanese: あやつられた名探偵（後編）)	Keiya Saito	N/A	May 2, 2015
As the group reaches their hideout, they find that it is made to resemble the crime scene where Mr. Pimple, who is Mr. Head's son, was killed. All of them, including Kogoro and Conan, are locked inside, until the culprit is revealed.
777	38	"Detective Boys vs. Elderly Detective League"; Transliteration: "Shōnen Tanteidan VS Shirubā Tanteidan" (Japanese: 少年探偵団VS老人探偵団)	Koichiro Kuroda	Nobuo Ogizawa	May 9, 2015
The Detective Boys and Conan met a group called the Detective Elderlies, who are similar to them. The Detective Elderlies said that they saw a thief with blond hair and followed him into a house, where they saw Kiyomasa Kuroda's corpse. The Detective Elderlies then seemed to have solved the case and said that the blond thief killed Kiyomasa, but Conan is doubting whether that is the truth.
778	39	"Mirage of the Disappearing Angel"; Transliteration: "Tenshi ga Kieta Shinkirō" (Japanese: 天使が消えた蜃気楼)	Akira Yoshimura	Tatsuro Inamoto	May 16, 2015
A painter was found dead by the sea shore and the only clue to find out the murderer is in the drawing the victim has painted.

== Home media release ==
Shogakukan/Being (Japan, Region 2 DVD)
Volume	Episodes^{Jp.}	Release date	Ref.
Volume 1	740-743	January 22, 2016	
Volume 2	744-747	February 22, 2016	
Volume 3	748-750, 753	March 25, 2016	
Volume 4	751-752, 757-758	April 22, 2016	
Volume 5	754-756, 767	May 27, 2016	
Volume 6	759-762	June 24, 2016	
Volume 7	765-766, 768	July 22, 2016	
Volume 8	763-764, 769, 774	August 26, 2016	
Volume 9	770-773	September 23, 2016	
Volume 10	775-778	November 25, 2016	
