= Case Closed season 23 =

Season of television series

Case Closed
- Season 23
- The cover of the first DVD compilation for season twenty-three of Detective Conan released by Shogakukan
- No. of episodes: 21

Release
- Original network: NNS (ytv)
- Original release: November 23, 2013 – May 17, 2014

Season chronology
- ← Previous; Season 22 Next → Season 24

The twenty-third season of the Case Closed anime was directed by Yasuichiro Yamamoto and produced by TMS Entertainment and Yomiuri Telecasting Corporation. The series is based on Gosho Aoyama's Case Closed manga series. In Japan, the series is titled Meitantei Conan (名探偵コナン, lit. Great Detective Conan, officially translated as Detective Conan) but was changed due to legal issues with the title Detective Conan. The series focuses on the adventures of teenage detective Shinichi Kudo who was turned into a child by a poison called APTX 4869, but continues working as a detective under the alias Conan Edogawa.

The episodes use five pieces of theme music: two openings and three endings. The first opening theme is "Q&A" by B'z used for episodes 716 and 717. The second opening theme is "Butterfly Core" by Valshe starting from episode 718. The first ending theme is Kimi no Egao ga Nani Yori mo Sukidatta (君の笑顔がなによりも好きだった, lit."I Loved Your Smile More Than Anything Else") by Chicago Poodle and was used until episode 721. The second ending theme is Ima Aitakute... (いま逢いたくて..., lit."I Want To See You Now...") by Daigo, for episodes 722 to 736. The third ending theme is "Rain Man" by Akihide starting from episode 737.

The season initially ran from November 23, 2013, through May 17, 2014, on Nippon Television Network System in Japan. The season was later collected and released in six DVD compilations by Shogakukan between March 27, 2015, and September 29, 2015, in Japan.

== Episode list ==
No.	No. in season	Title	Directed by	Written by	Original air date
719	1	"A Dispute Over a Platinum Ticket"; Transliteration: "Purachina Chiketto Sōdō-ki" (Japanese: プラチナチケット騒動記)	Akira Yoshimura	Yukiko Okazaki	November 23, 2013
While Ran, Sonoko and Conan go to a coffee shop after receiving a concert ticket, another customer arrives with her friend and loses her ticket there. The next day, she comes back showing the same ticket auctioned off on the internet. While the three along with the manager, another employee and the customer go to the home of another employee who did not arrive work, they find her dead. The house appears to have been robbed. Another tenant explains that she went to a convenience store after putting some clothes to wash in the machine. He observed this because it was emitting a different, loud noise. He also tells that there was a five-minute pause in between. Conan, through a sleeping Sonoko, deduces that the employee is the murderer. She took the ticket but the aprons between them were exchanged. As she tried to remove the apron from the washing machine, the other employee returned. She accidentally causes her death and stages a robbery.
720	2	"Fire and Water Mystery Tour (Aso Part)"; Transliteration: "Hi to Mizu no Misuterītsuā (Asopen)" (Japanese: 火と水のミステリーツアー（阿蘇編）)	Takanori Yano	Atsushi Maekawa	November 30, 2013
Conan, Ran, The Detective Boys, Haibara and Kogoro go on a trip to Mt. Aso. They meet a boy called Justin and his mother there. Justin shows them his stamp collection book, where he has stamps from all the tourist attractions at Mt Aso. They later part. While they are on a break, we see a man leaving behind a bag on a bench, and another man picks it up and leaves behind a stuff toy. Ayumi tries to return the toy but is pushed away by the man. He is chased by the police and Conan. They see the man dashes into Justin, who is carrying a similar toy and the toys are exchanged. Everyone returns. The man who left the bag is Monkichi Kumada, who owns Kumamon Foods. He says a thief stole important details regarding new sweet tastes which are unpatented and demanded ten million. Another detective calls, Kouda, and informs them that the thief is caught but there was nothing in the stuffed toy. Conan explains that the toys were exchanged and tracks down Justin's location. As they are nearing Justin, they see the thief trying to snatch the toy from Justin's mother, and while trying to protect her, Justin is kidnapped by the thief. He threatens the police with Justin's life not to follow him. Conan wonders how the thief learned Justin's location so quickly, when the only people, other than the original gang, present were the detectives, the president and another worker, Inoue.
721	3	"Fire and Water Mystery Tour (Kumamoto Part)"; Transliteration: "Hi to Mizu no Misuterītsuā (Kumamotohen)" (Japanese: 火と水のミステリーツアー（熊本編）)	Nobuharu Kamanaka	Atsushi Maekawa	December 7, 2013
Conan overhears the police talking to Kogoro about the thief's next call. He is suddenly joined by Haibara and The Detective Boys and Inoue. They start searching for Justin and the culprit. After tracking him down, they make him lose the stuffed toy by spilling more similar toys and the police manage to catch him when he tries to take the money. He turns out to be Kouda. Ayumi manages to find the toy with the usb and when Inoue tries to take it, Haibara stops him. Sleeping Kogoro tells them all that it was actually Inoue who stole the secret data.
722	4	"Sweet and Cold Delivery Service (Part 1)"; Transliteration: "Amaku Tsumetai Takkyūbin (Zenpen)" (Japanese: 甘く冷たい宅急便（前編）)	Koichiro Kuroda	N/A	December 14, 2013
As Conan, Haibara and The Detective Boys are playing football, they meet a cat which makes rounds around the Beika area. Following it, they are locked inside a delivery truck, within which they find a dead body. The delivery men talk about how it was an accidental death and they are making rounds and trying to be noticed to create an alibi. As the kids realise that they cannot ask for help directly, Conan has an idea.
723	5	"Sweet and Cold Delivery Service (Part 2)"; Transliteration: "Amaku tsumetai takkyūbin (Kōhen)" (Japanese: 甘く冷たい宅急便（後編）)	Minoru Tozawa	N/A	December 21, 2013
Conan sends the cat with the message on the taxi receipt, but it is blown away before Amuro can intercept it, but he chases after it and decodes it. Meanwhile, since there has been no help for quite long, Conan, deduceing that the final stop is Agasa's house, makes modifications on the receiver's address so that it reaches the Kudo house. Subaru interprets this and sends back another parcel with a phone in it via the delivery men. Before Conan can call the police, the delivery men catch them. By them, Amuro catches up and stops the delivery men from hurting the kids. But he denies having interpreted the message and says the receipt was blown away. He also declines when the kids invite him to Agase's house.
724	6	"Kaitou Kid and the Blush Mermaid (Part 1)"; Transliteration: "Kaito kiddo to sekimen no ningyo (Zenpen)" (Japanese: 怪盗キッドと赤面の人魚（前編）)	Taichi Atarashi	N/A	January 4, 2014
The Blush Mermaid goes on display at the Suzuki Museum, stuck on the shell of a turtle swimming inside a water tank. Kaitou Kid has announced that he will steal the jewel.
725	7	"Kaitou Kid and the Blush Mermaid (Part 2)"; Transliteration: "Kaito kiddo to sekimen no ningyo (Kōhen)" (Japanese: 怪盗キッドと赤面の人魚（後編）)	Akira Yoshimura	N/A	January 11, 2014
The blush mermaid was stolen by Kaitou Kid, but it appears it wasn't stolen but gone. Thus Conan and Police try to find where the jewel was gone and how that happened.
726	8	"A Happy E-mail Brings Sadness"; Transliteration: "Shiawase Mail wa Fukō o Yobu" (Japanese: 幸福メールは不幸を呼ぶ)	Takanori Yano	Tatsuro Inamoto	January 18, 2014
Conan, Ran, and Kogoro come across Nana lying on the ground in the park after nearly driving into a scooter blocking the road. Nana left behind a dying message that resembles the top part of the kanji for "left" (左) or "right" (右).
727	9	"The Treasure Chest Filled With Fruits (Part 1)"; Transliteration: "Kajitsuka Tsumatta Takarabako (Zenpen)" (Japanese: 果実か詰まった宝箱（前編）)	Nobuharu Kamanaka	N/A	January 25, 2014
A murdered man found dead in the chest of fruits.
728	10	"The Treasure Chest Filled With Fruits (Part 2)"; Transliteration: "Kajitsuka Tsumatta Takarabako (Kōhen)" (Japanese: 果実か詰まった宝箱（後編）)	Koichiro Kuroda	N/A	February 1, 2014
Conan and Sera works together to solve the mystery.
729	11	"The Diamond, the Painting, and the Great Actress"; Transliteration: "Daiya to Kaiga to Dai Joyū" (Japanese: ダイヤと絵画と大女優)	Minoru Tozawa	Tatsumi Kakihara	February 8, 2014
The episode begins with Mouri Kogoro, Ran, and Conan watching the ending of an old movie starring retired actress Misuzu Shirakawa at the actress's home. As the trio tour the home with the actress, her three children, and the maid, they are surprised to witness consistent quarreling in the household with Misuzu Shirakawa being the unpleasant one. As the afternoon draws close, the actress retires to her bedroom for an afternoon nap, a car accident occurs outside, and then smoke emerges from the bedroom.
730	12	"The Figure That Was Too Good"; Transliteration: "Kanpeki Sugita Figyua" (Japanese: 完璧すぎたフィギュア)	Akira Yoshimura	Koshiro Mikami	February 22, 2014
Doctor Agasa and Detective Boys including Ai and Conan went to Figure Expo to observe some Figures for research of their works. Upon hearing a woman scream, Conan and the Detective Boys rush into a room to find Kitajima lying dead on the floor from a stab wound. Thus the police has to find the culprit who killed Kitajima among the editor who was rude at him, his fiancé who was upset at him and a fellow artist who owes him plenty and was distant at him.
731	13	"The Ex-Boyfriend Living Next to a Crime Scene (Part 1)"; Transliteration: "Genba no Rinjin wa Moto Kare (Zenpen)" (Japanese: 現場の隣人は元カレ（前編）)	Takanori Yano	N/A	March 1, 2014
Conan and the Detective Boys run into Naeko Miike and Yumi Miyamoto, who were talking about Yumi's ex-boyfriend. Naeko Miike shortly receives a call from her acquaintance, Sakurako Yonehara, about a dead body. When the police arrive on the scene, the case seems to be a suicide, but Conan points out that the ripped-out suicide note does not match the ripped page of the victim's notebook. Also, the note is signed with the victim's full name, while all of her other notes were signed with only her first name. Thus, the case develops into a possible murder.
732	14	"The Ex-Boyfriend Living Next to a Crime Scene (Part 2)"; Transliteration: "Genba no Rinjin wa Moto Kare (Kōhen)" (Japanese: 現場の隣人は元カレ（後編）)	Taichi Atarashi	N/A	March 8, 2014
Conan pieces all the clues together: the suicide note with somewhat strange contents, Shukichi Haneda mentioning a "well-prepared move", same phone models of all the family members, the trick behind the bedroom door closing upon Sakurako and the victim's husband entering the room, and the victim's phone on the floor.
733	15	"The Wedding Reception and the Two Gunshots"; Transliteration: "Hirōen to Futatsu no Jūsei" (Japanese: 披露宴と二つの銃声)	Koichiro Kuroda	Toyoto Kogiso	March 22, 2014
Sonoko must go to a wedding representing her family, and since she doesn't want to go alone she ropes Conan and Ran into going with her. The groom is the eldest son and heir of the incredibly rich Hatakeyama family, and he's marrying a young woman named Miho. The wedding takes place in a very nice villa, and things go well at first until the end of the reception.
734	16	"Jodie's Memories and the Cherry Blossom Viewing Trap^{1 hr.}" Transliteration: "Jodie no Tsuioku to Ohanami no Wana" (Japanese: ジョディの追憶とお花見の罠)	Minoru Tozawa Akira Yoshimura	N/A	March 29, 2014
Professor Agasa takes the Detective Boys to see cherry blossoms. Conan informed Jodie Starling that Scar Akai is actually Bourbon in disguise. Professor Agasa told Conan that he have witnessed someone being hit repeatedly at the shrine grounds. After solving the case, Conan find it weird that the suspect Benzaki does not seem to recognise the victim despite seeing her twice. Benzaki's pregnant wife Motoe appear and fall on Jodie Starling. Both Conan and Ai find it weird that Motoe appear to be 6 months pregnant but still having morning sickness.
735	17	"The Coded Invitation"; Transliteration: "Angō-tsuki no Jōtaijō" (Japanese: 暗号付きの招待状)	Takanori Yano	Kazunari Kouchi	April 19, 2014
A client named Kaori Kitasaka asks Kogoro for help to decode the location in an invitation. Before she leaves, she gives Kogoro her home and cellphone number. After realizing he has deduced and given her the wrong location, Kogoro tries calling her home number but realize she gave him a fake number. Kogoro call her cellphone number and she picks up. Kogoro gives her the correct location, Bell Tree Tower, to Kaori. Conan finds her suspicious and figures out Kaori's real home phone number then calls it. He's surprised when Sato begins talking to him on the phone and the group discovers that a gun (Nambu Taisho 14) is missing from Kaori's home.
736	18	"The Secret of the Statue of Kogoro Mouri"; Transliteration: "Mōri Kogorō-zō no Himitsu" (Japanese: 毛利小五郎像の秘密)	Minoru Tozawa	Tatsuro Inamoto	April 26, 2014
Since Kataoka is a big fan of Mouri, the crew is invited to Kataoka's house. While everyone gathered in the garden, Kataoka, disguised as 'Kaito K', insisted Mouri and others to find him as a seeker during the hide and seek in his house. After hearing Kataoka scream, Conan, Ran, and Seiya head in the direction of the sound to find Sada holding the deceased Kataoka. It appears Kataoka died after receiving blunt force trauma by falling off a ladder.
737	19	"The Suspicious Walking Path"; Transliteration: "Giwaku no Sanpomichi" (Japanese: 疑惑の散歩道)	Koichiro Kuroda	Koshiro Mikami	May 3, 2014
Conan and his friends were playing Frisbee at the park, when a dog named Matsunosuke launched off of Conan's head and caught the Frisbee. Matsunosuke's owner, Kanae Asakawa, apologized and took Conan's jacket in order to have it cleaned after Matsunosuke left it dirty. The next day when Conan and the Detective Boys arrived at her house to retrieve the jacket they met Kanae's friend Tomoko and see Matsunosuke in his dog house, asleep.
738	20	"Kogoro In The Bar (Part 1)"; Transliteration: "Kogorō wa Bā ni iru (Zenpen)" (Japanese: 小五郎はBARにいる（前編）)	Shiro Izumi	N/A	May 10, 2014
Kogoro is undercover at the Blue Parrot, because Yuzuki Fukui request him to investigate on a weird popping sound she hears frequently. Conan joins him stating that Ran is angry because Kogoro is not home. But a simple investigation in a bar becomes more dramatic when Chikafumi Usuda, the company's boss, is found dead.
739	21	"Kogoro In The Bar (Part 2)"; Transliteration: "Kogorō wa Bā ni iru (Kōhen)" (Japanese: 小五郎はBARにいる（後編）)	Akira Yoshimura	N/A	May 17, 2014
Kogoro summons police to explain the details of the case. Once again, Conan solve the mystery. After solving the case, Detective Takagi told Conan that the suspect Benzaki from "Jodie's Memories and the Cherry Blossom Viewing Trap" Case said that he does not remember being involved in the pickpocket case. Conan realised the fake couple was Bourbon and Vermouth in disguise and rushes back to the Mouri Detective Agency in panic.

== Home media release ==
Shogakukan/Being (Japan, Region 2 DVD)
Volume	Episodes^{Jp.}	Release date	Ref.
Volume 1	716-717, 719, 726	March 27, 2015	
Volume 2	720-723	May 22, 2015	
Volume 3	724-725, 727-728	June 26, 2015	
Volume 4	729-732	July 24, 2015	
Volume 5	733-735	August 28, 2015	
Volume 6	736-739	September 29, 2015	
