= Case Closed season 22 =

2013 season of anime television series

Case Closed
- Season 22
- The cover of the first DVD compilation for season twenty-two of Detective Conan released by Shogakukan
- No. of episodes: 38

Release
- Original network: NNS (ytv)
- Original release: January 5 – November 16, 2013

Season chronology
- ← Previous; Season 21 Next → Season 23

The twenty-second season of the Case Closed anime was directed by Yasuichiro Yamamoto and produced by TMS Entertainment and Yomiuri Telecasting Corporation. The series is based on Gosho Aoyama's Case Closed manga series. In Japan, the series is titled Detective Conan (名探偵コナン, Meitantei Conan) but was changed due to legal issues with the title Detective Conan. The series focuses on the adventures of teenage detective Shinichi Kudo who was turned into a child by a poison called APTX 4869, but continues working as a detective under the alias Conan Edogawa.

The episodes use five pieces of theme music: two opening and three ending themes. The first opening theme is "Try Again" by Mai Kuraki starting from episode 681 to 695. The second opening theme is "Q&A" by B'z starting from episode 696. The first ending theme is Koi ni Koi Shite (恋に恋して, lit. "In Love With Love") by Mai Kuraki and is used up to episode 685. The second ending theme is Hitomi no Melody (瞳のメロディ, lit. "Melody of Eyes") by Boyfriend from episode 686 to 704. The third ending theme is Kimi no Egao ga Nani Yori mo Sukidatta (君の笑顔がなによりも好きだった, lit."I Loved Your Smile More Than Anything Else") by Chicago Poodle starting from episode 705.

The season initially ran from January 5, 2013, through November 16, 2013, on Nippon Television Network System in Japan. The season was later collected and released in nine DVD compilations by Shogakukan between January 24, 2014, and October 24, 2014, in Japan.

== Episode list ==
No.	No. in season	Title	Directed by	Written by	Original air date
681	1	"The Life-Threatening Broadcast of Love (Begin Broadcasting)"; Transliteration: "Inochi wo Kaketa Ren'ai Chuukei (Chuukei Kaishi)" (Japanese: 命を賭けた恋愛中継（中継開始）)	Akira Yoshimura	N/A	January 5, 2013
Today is the anniversary of the death of Takagi's mentor, Wataru Date. Detective Takagi finishes work early but no one, including Sato, knows where he disappeared to. The Detective Boys are waiting outside the police station for a safety pamphlet photoshoot when a stranger asks them to deliver a parcel to Takagi's girlfriend. The parcel contains a tablet broadcasting a tied up Takagi in real time. They have about 24 hours to figure out where he is before the bomb explodes. The police investigates the 3 old case files Takagi was recently looking over.
682	2	"The Life-Threatening Broadcast of Love (Desperate Situation)"; Transliteration: "Inochi wo Kaketa Ren'ai Chuukei (Zettai Zetsumei)" (Japanese: 命を賭けた恋愛中継（絶体絶命）)	Shigeru Yamazaki	N/A	January 12, 2013
After discussing the suicide cases with Sato, Conan concludes that Takagi was looking for his mentor's girlfriend who never got news about his death. She committed suicide believing Date left her. The police find the girlfriend's old English teacher who mixed up the two Watarus and blamed Takagi for her death. Before Sato can get any information about Takagi's whereabouts, the old man succumbs to the poison wine he was drinking.
683	3	"The Life-Threatening Broadcast of Love (Enter the Scene)"; Transliteration: "Inochi wo Kaketa Ren'ai Chuukei (Genba Totsunyū)" (Japanese: 命を賭けた恋愛中継（現場突入）)	Nobuharu Kamanaka	N/A	January 19, 2013
With the kidnapper dead, the police have to rely on the video of Takagi to figure out where he is. Conan recognizes the Western Jackdaw that is only found in Hokkaido and narrows down the search area. Every four story building is searched, but Takagi remains missing. After reviewing the footage, Conan realizes that the kidnapper placed a mirror underneath Takagi to give the illusion of a tall building. Takagi manages to remove the scarf over his mouth and name his location. Sato finds him right before the bomb detonates. In her joy over his safety, she kisses him in front of the cameras. Every police officer who was worried or crying over Takagi earlier suddenly wants to beat him up again.
684	4	"Froth, Steam, and Smoke (Part 1)"; Transliteration: "Awa to Yuge to Kemuri (Zenpen)" (Japanese: 泡と湯気と煙（前編）)	Minoru Tozawa	N/A	January 26, 2013
Conan and Ai bump into Takagi coming out of a stakeout. He still has nightmares about falling off the plank he was tied to (see previous episode). A woman screams nearby and they discover the body of a publishing company president. 3 people were contacted by the victim right before his deadly fall. They all claim to have been alone in their apartment at the time. Takagi and Conan examine each apartment before the suspects can change anything. The first suspect shows the beer he recently poured out still foaming at the top. The second suspect shows her cup of hot coffee still steaming on the table. The third suspect shows his cigarette still smoking after it just burnt out. All 3 also admit that they're currently in a lawsuit against the president for doctoring photos and slandering a famous actress.
685	5	"Froth, Steam, and Smoke (Part 2)"; Transliteration: "Awa to Yuge to Kemuri (Kōhen)" (Japanese: 泡と湯気と煙（後編）)	Koichiro Kuroda	N/A	February 2, 2013
After experimenting with beer, coffee, and cigarettes, the police conclude that neither suspect could've left their apartment for more than the 10 minutes required to push the president off his balcony and return by the stairs. Conan then remembers Uncle Kogoro telling him about sprinkling salt in his flat beers to make them foam when he was a poor student. The first suspect is arrested. He explains that the slandered actress was his friend and old classmate, and that the president stole his memory card so they lost their only piece of evidence for the lawsuit.
686	6	"A Car Carrying A Time Bomb"; Transliteration: "Jigen Bakudan o Noseta Kuruma" (Japanese: 時限爆弾を乗せた車)	Akira Yoshimura	Junichi Miyashita	February 9, 2013
A bomb detonates and kills an unknown man. On the other side of town, Ayumi's neighbour Mao runs to the Detective Boys for help with her runaway dog, Candy. While searching one of the nearby delivery trucks, they bump into Takagi and Chiba working a serial bombing case. The police locate the last bomb in a delivery truck, but it is then hijacked by two robbers. Candy happens to be in that truck. The police leak fake checkpoints and corner the robbers. Conan manages to jump into the truck and convince the robbers to drive somewhere open to throw out the bomb saving everyone.
687	7	"The Unsolvable Ice Trap"; Transliteration: "Dare mo tokenai Kōri no Wana" (Japanese: 誰もとけない氷の罠)	Shigeru Yamazaki	Asami Ishikawa	February 16, 2013
Professor Agasa take the Detective Boys to visit an ice village. The mayor and his secretary boast about cancelling the winter festival to build a resort to bring in more income. The group stays overnight in the ice hotel. The next morning, the mayor staying in another part of the ice hotel is found strangulated in his bed. Professor Agasa reveals the culprit to be the ice sculptor using an ice melting trick to murder the mayor without leaving any evidence behind. The sculptor explains that he overheard the mayor and his secretary talk about murdering the previous mayor who suspected their embezzling the city's finances.
688	8	"Detective Takagi Finds 30 Million Yen"; Transliteration: "Takagi-keiji 3000 Man-en Hirou" (Japanese: 高木刑事3000万円拾う)	Nobuharu Kamanaka	Nobuo Ogizawa	February 23, 2013
During his morning jog, Takagi comes upon a gym bag filled with 30 million yen. The owner of the bag, an organic grocery store manager, claims that he dropped it the previous night. When the newspaper man tells Conan that the bag wasn't there earlier that morning, he suspects that the grocer placed the bag for someone specific. Takagi questions the woman who was with him when he found the bag, but she doesn't know the grocer. The woman's partner then runs after Takagi thinking he was questioning her about a murder-robbery case that occurred 15 years ago. Ironically, the grocer was a suspect in that case, but had a solid alibi being hospitalized at the time of the crime. Sleeping Kogoro reveals that the grocer was indeed the robber who murdered the woman's first husband and that he had lent his health insurance card to his friend who was hospitalized under his name. The grocer later met his wife who inspired him to straighten his life. When his wife died, the grocer decided to give all his earnings to the woman and turn himself in. As he was about to approach the woman at the cemetery, he overhears her and her partner talk about finally moving on. The grocer didn't want to reopen old wounds. Takagi brings him in as the woman refuses the money and tells him to use it for a fresh start.
689	9	"The Client's Message"; Transliteration: "Iraijin Kara no Messēji" (Japanese: 依頼人からのメッセージ)	Minoru Tozawa	Atsushi Maekawa	March 2, 2013
3 months ago, 24-year-old Kaoru Sasamori, who hired Kogoro to investigate her boyfriend, fell down the stairs and died. At her funeral, Kaoru's brother accused her boyfriend Tsuge of pushing her down the stairs. In present day, Kogoro is summoned by Tsuge with the message, "Come and I'll tell you about her murderer". Kaoru's brother, her best friend Kazumi, and Tsuge's manager all show up at the same time. They find Tsuge bludgeoned to death in his workshop. Sleeping Kogoro explains that Tsuge was about to reveal Kazumi as the murderer through his shadow art. Kazumi, in love with Tsuge, killed Kaoru in hopes of being with him. She believed he was going to announce their relationship when she was summoned, but he instead told her to turn herself in. Blinded by rage, she kills him, but can't bring herself to destroy the incriminating sculpture as it was the only proof that Tsuge spent the last 3 months thinking about her.
690	10	"Yusaku Kudo's Cold Case (Part 1)"; Transliteration: "Kudō Yūsaku no Mikaiketsujiken (Zenpen)" (Japanese: 工藤優作の未解決事件（前編）)	Koichiro Kuroda	N/A	March 9, 2013
Ran, Sonoko, and Sera find the body of a man in an alleyway with the kanji symbol for "death" written in blood next to it. Ran is reminded of a similar case that happened 10 years ago and heads over to the Kudo residence to look for the case file in the library. Shinichi remembers the case as the one his father walked away from claiming that the murderer would never reappear. Subaru joins the girls and Conan in their deductions.
691	11	"Yusaku Kudo's Cold Case (Part 2)"; Transliteration: "Kudō Yūsaku no Mikaiketsujiken (Kōhen)" (Japanese: 工藤優作の未解決事件（後編）)	Akira Yoshimura	N/A	March 16, 2013
In a phone call with Ran as Shinichi, Conan hears that Subaru compared him to a ninja. Reminded of the sanada flag with its six coins, Conan solves the mystery.
692	12	"The Evening Cherry Blossom Viewing Route on Sumida River (Part 1)"; Transliteration: "Sumidagawa Yozakura Rūto (Zenpen)" (Japanese: 隅田川夜桜ルート（前編）)	Nobuharu Kamanaka	Hiroshi Kashiwabara	March 23, 2013
Kogoro receives a call from an unknown person to follow instructions for delivering the ransom money worth 24 million yen. Conan is on the skateboard following the boat. After the boat goes through under the bridges, the briefcase went missing on top of the boat.
693	13	"The Evening Cherry Blossom Viewing Route on Sumida River (Part 2)"; Transliteration: "Sumidagawa Yozakura Rūto (Kōhen)" (Japanese: 隅田川夜桜ルート（後編）)	Shinji Ushiro Takanori Yano	Hiroshi Kashiwabara	March 30, 2013
The next day, Ran and Conan arrived at Nishizawa's apartment and found Nishizawa drowned to death in the bathroom. At the Sumida river, people were amazed that there's lot of money floating in the water.
694	14	"The Missing Sweets in the Old Shop"; Transliteration: "Kieta Shinise no Wagashi" (Japanese: 消えた老舗の和菓子)	Minoru Tozawa	Takeharu Sakurai	April 20, 2013
The chocolate flavored sweets have gone missing in every branch shop around Kyoto. Conan, Ran, Sonoko, Kogoro and the Detective Boys are on the move to find the missing sweets.
695	15	"The Roses in the Vineyard"; Transliteration: "Budō Hata ni Bara no Hana" (Japanese: 葡萄畑に薔薇の花)	Koichiro Kuroda	Tatsumi Kakihara	April 27, 2013
A murdered man was found in a barrel warehouse located in a vineyard. Conan is going to find out the murderer who murdered the man.
696	16	"The Flowerbed Vandal's Scheme"; Transliteration: "Kadan Arashi no Inbō" (Japanese: 花壇あらしの陰謀)	Akira Yoshimura	Yu Kaneko	May 4, 2013
At first, Detective Boys found that a flowerbed somewhere else has been vandalized. Soon after that, a murder has taken place near the destroyed flowerbed.
697	17	"The Window at the Girls' School"; Transliteration: "Onna Gakuen no Mado" (Japanese: 女学園の窓)	Masanori Hashimoto	Masaki Tsuji	May 11, 2013
Kogoro was hired by Misaki Yanai, an old friend of Ran and Sonoko from middle-high school, to reinvestigate the suicide of her older sister, Nagisa. Misaki believe that her sister didn't commit suicide but instead, was murdered. Kogoro then phoned Inspector Megure and was confirmed that it was indeed a suicide which make Misaki burst into tears. With Conan suggestion, Kogoro allow her to retell what actually occurred. As Nagisa had planned to marry Shibagaki after she finished high school, she has no reason to commit suicide. They later arranged for Takagi to share them the crime scene's photo.
698	18	"Unbelievable! The Case of the Crashed UFO"; Transliteration: "Masaka! Yūfō Tsuiraku Jiken" (Japanese: まさか! UFO墜落事件)	Nobuharu Kamanaka	Nobuo Ogizawa	May 18, 2013
One unknown aircraft crashes and Conan must prove aliens are not behind it, and when he was searching for progress within the crash case, he found unexpected answer from the scene.
699	19	"The Shadow Approaching Haibara's Secret (Part 1)"; Transliteration: "Haibara no himitsu ni semaru kage (Zenpen)" (Japanese: 灰原の秘密に迫る影（前編）)	Minoru Tozawa	N/A	June 8, 2013
Agasa takes the Detective Boys on a camping trip when they run into Masumi Sera who eventually joins their camping trip. While Genta, Mitsuhiko, Ayumi, and Haibara collect firewood, they encounter a man burying a female corpse. After being discovered by the killer and being chased by him, they find refuge in a cabin in the woods. While in the cabin, they discover that it was actually the crime scene of the murder. Meanwhile, Agasa, Conan, and Sera start to worry about them because their camping area happen to be out of cell-phone ranges. The Gunma police discover three suspicious men wandering alone in the forest claiming that they were innocent for the murder. While the Gunma police investigate the murder, they Detective Boys realize that they had been locked inside the cabin by the murderer while a fire is starting at the back of the cabin. Although the smoke has attracted the attention of Conan, Inspector Yamamura claims that it was only the smoke of a campfire started by youngsters in the forest for a party.
700	20	"The Shadow Approaching Haibara's Secret (Part 2)"; Transliteration: "Haibara no himitsu ni semaru kage (Kōhen)" (Japanese: 灰原の秘密に迫る影（後編）)	Koichiro Kuroda	N/A	June 15, 2013
In the cabin, Ayumi suddenly passes out due to lack of oxygen. Suddenly, a woman appears with an axe and breaks the door down. Meanwhile, Conan and Sera discover the true meaning of the victim's dying message. She created a puppet shadow of a rabbit with her hands because she was a nursery teacher and is said as usagi. The culprit was a man named Usagi who was claustrophobic who accidentally killed her. He claims that although she knew that he was claustrophobic, she shut him inside a dark room. He panicked and accidentally struck her on the back while swinging the axe around. However, her really wanted him to overcome his claustrophobia because due to the fact that he was a photographer and used a film camera, he would not be able to develop the pictures himself inside a dark room. Afterwards, Conan and Sera race to the burning cabin only to discover that Ayumi, Genta, and Mitsuhiko were safe because of a "beautiful woman." Conan figures that the "beautiful woman" was Haibara who took the antidote of APTX4869 and wore the deceased woman's clothes in order to save everybody. She tells them a lie in order to hide the fact that she was Haibara, returned in here normal state. However, Mitsuhiko had secretly taken a video of her and sent it to the Detective Agency. There, a waiter at the café below the agency sees the video and so does Subaru Okiya, while drinking Bourbon whiskey.
701	21	"The Jet-Black Mystery Train (Departure)"; Transliteration: "Shikkoku no Misuterītorein (Hassha)" (Japanese: 漆黒の特急（発車）)	Akira Yoshimura	N/A	July 13, 2013
Vermouth, Gin, Vodka and Bourbon initiate a plan to eliminate Haibara aboard the Bell Tree Express. Meanwhile, an unrelated passenger is murdered under the guise of it being a performance.
702	22	"The Jet-Black Mystery Train (Tunnel)"; Transliteration: "Shikkoku no Misuterītorein (Zuidō)" (Japanese: 漆黒の特急（隧道）)	Takanori Yano	N/A	July 20, 2013
Conan and Sera realise the truth of the murder, and realise that despite appearances it couldn't be a suicide. During the investigation, Sera sees Shuichi Akai again but he doesn't appear to notice her.
703	23	"The Jet-Black Mystery Train (Intersection)"; Transliteration: "Shikkoku no Misuterītorein (Kōsa)" (Japanese: 漆黒の特急（交差）)	Tomomi Ikeda	N/A	July 27, 2013
Haibara receives a cryptic message from Vermouth before learning about the Silver Bullet project and taking the antidote to APTX4869 after running away from Subaru believing that he is Bourbon. Sera bumps into Akai again and her connection to him is revealed.
704	24	"The Jet-Black Mystery Train (Final Destination)"; Transliteration: "Shikkoku no Misuterītorein (Shūten)" (Japanese: 漆黒の特急（終点）)	Yasuichiro Yamamoto	N/A	August 3, 2013
Conan reveals the truth of the murder via tranquilizing Mouri Kogorou. He is assisted by Tooru Amuro helping with Mouri's deductions. Akai's true identity is revealed by Yukiko Kudo and Amuro introduces himself to Haibara for the first time, explaining that he is Bourbon. Ran is looking for Sera and Haibara as she doesn't know where they are, but neither does Kogorou. Bourbon and Haibara discuss Moroboshi Dai(Shuichi Akai) before Bourbon explains that he believes Shuichi Akai truly did die during the Clash of Red and Black. As Bourbon attempts to capture Sherry, a strange man resembling Akai is watching concealed by smoke from the bombs Vermouth planted. During the explosion, Sherry appears to die and Bourbon reports this to Vermouth. Gin is unconvinced, and following his explanation for why Vermouth is uncertain as well but doesn't know who she saw "die." Subaru is seen watching Vermouth and Bourbon discussing the matter before being shown to be Akai in disguise.
705	25	"Conan Inside a Locked Room"; Transliteration: "Misshitsu ni Iru Conan" (Japanese: 密室にいるコナン)	Koichiro Kuroda	N/A	August 10, 2013
Ran, Sonoko, Kogoro, and Conan are at a tennis court when they find Tooru Amuro there. Later, Conan has a concussion from a flying racket and rests inside the racket's thrower's villa. Later, a man is killed inside the villa while Conan rests inside it. Conan deduces that it was a locked room murder as the body blocked entryway from the door and the windows were locked from the inside. Three suspects were named as Conan tries to figure out the mystery behind this locked room murder.
706	26	"Bourbon Figures It Out"; Transliteration: "Nazotoki Suru Bābon" (Japanese: 謎解きするバーボン)	Minoru Tozawa	N/A	August 17, 2013
Amuro, who is known as Bourbon in the black organization, solves the case with Conan.
707	27	"The Framed Great Detective"; Transliteration: "Hamerareta Meitantei" (Japanese: はめられた名探偵)	Akira Yoshimura	Junichi Miyashita	August 31, 2013
While having a snack in a roadside café, Kogoro is called by Reiji Himuro, who seems envious of Kogoro's nice life and then says that at that moment, someone was to die because of Kogoro. At that time, Shingo Numao falls off a building, watched by a police officer who had been called there by an anonymous call. After Conan spots Himuro in a department store across the street, Kogoro runs there and up the stairs, where he is met by Himuro. Kogoro grabs Himuro at the lapels, which is photographed by customers. Both Himuro and Numao turn out to be bank robbers, with Numano having helped Kogoro apprehend Himuro who had been his boss. During the interrogation, Himuro provokes Kogoro into attacking him, knowing that Kogoro gave him an alibi for the time Numao fell. Kogoro accuses Himuro of killing Numao, but since there is no evidence at all and Kogoro himself gives an alibi to Himuro, Himuro is let go. Inspector Megure admonishes Kogoro that the way he behaved would have landed Kogoro in jail if it had gone on, and the media and the internet have a field day.
708	28	"The Man Who Fell Slowly"; Transliteration: "Yukkuri Ochita Otoko" (Japanese: ゆっくり落ちた男)	Takanori Yano	Junichi Iioka Yusuke Takeda Nobuo Ogizawa	September 7, 2013
Agasa and the Detective boys are riding on a bus on a public holiday when, at exactly 2 p.m., they witness a man shoving another man off the roof of a nearby building. The bus starts before they can get out. When they get back at 2:20, an ambulance has just arrived, having been called by a pedestrian who almost was hit by the falling man. The man on the pavement is identified as Masaaki Ogata, a loan shark. As it takes on average 5-6 minutes for an ambulance in Tokyo to reach the site of an emergency, Conan asks when the call was made, and learns at about 2:10, right after man hit the pavement. 10 Minutes is a long time for someone to drop five floors, though. In the office of the loan shark signs of a struggle are found, and traces of someone who has been dragged from the balcons into the office. Also, there is a drivers license issued to Ryouhei Honda, and his glasses are found on the balcony outside of the railing. After searching, Detective Chiba finds Honda who takes him hostage. He claims to have lost his memory.
709	29	"An Unconfirmed Shocking Case"; Transliteration: "Mi Kakunin Shōgeki Jiken" (Japanese: 未確認衝撃事件)	Nobuharu Kamanaka	Yasutoshi Murakawa	September 14, 2013
A man hit by the falling steel frame was dead. But Conan finds out that it wasn't supposed to be an accident but a murder.
710	30	"Everyone Saw (Part 1)"; Transliteration: "Min'na ga Mite Ita (Zenpen)" (Japanese: みんなが見ていた（前編）)	Koichiro Kuroda	N/A	September 21, 2013
Hattori and Kazuha arrive at the Mouri agency with Osaka's, Inspector Otaki to inform Mouri and, specifically, Conan, of a suspicious case in Tokyo. The police had kept watch on all entrances to victim, Hidemichi Mizuki's apartment, only to find him hung with a limited edition chair knocked below his feet. Kazuha identifies this chair, and confirms that the chair's height is 10cm below where the victim's feet would be while hung. After solving the first mystery, the crew begin to exit the apartment building. While waiting for the elevator, third floor resident, Nanami, overhears the detective's talk of Kaizou Fuura, a man who caused the victim to be in large debt, and comments on how her husband, too, suffered great losses due to Kaizou Fuura's influence of investing in the stock market. At that moment, Kaizou Fuura appears from the elevator window shooting himself.
711	31	"Everyone Saw (Part 2)"; Transliteration: "Min'na ga Mite Ita (Kōhen)" (Japanese: みんなが見ていた（後編）)	Minoru Tozawa	N/A	September 28, 2013
Conan and Heiji continues to solve the murder mystery.
712	32	"Heiji Hattori and the Vampire Mansion (Part 1)"; Transliteration: "Hattori Heiji to Kyūketsuki Yakata (Ichi)" (Japanese: 服部平次と吸血鬼館（一）)	Masahisa Koyata	N/A	October 5, 2013
Following the murder in Tokyo, Heiji and Kazuha accompany Otaki with Conan and company to investigate a "vampire" curse on a family as a request from Hattori's father to Otaki. At the arrival of the mansion, it is reavealed that the butler submitted the request to Heiji's father. He requested a detective to be present at the inheritance ceremony
713	33	"Heiji Hattori and the Vampire Mansion (Part 2)"; Transliteration: "Hattori Heiji to Kyūketsuki Yakata (Ni)" (Japanese: 服部平次と吸血鬼館（二）)	Akira Yoshimura	N/A	October 12, 2013
The second murder was taken place.
714	34	"Heiji Hattori and the Vampire Mansion (Part 3)"; Transliteration: "Hattori Heiji to Kyūketsuki Yakata (San)" (Japanese: 服部平次と吸血鬼館（三）)	Takanori Yano	N/A	October 19, 2013
The third murder happens.
715	35	"Heiji Hattori and the Vampire Mansion (Part 4)"; Transliteration: "Hattori Heiji to Kyūketsuki Yakata (Yon)" (Japanese: 服部平次と吸血鬼館（四）)	Nobuharu Kamanaka	N/A	October 26, 2013
Conan and Heiji are going to find out the culprit behind all the murders.
716	36	"Dancing Demon at the Noh Mask Mansion (Part 1)"; Transliteration: "Nōmen yashiki ni oni ga odoru (zenpen)" (Japanese: 能面屋敷に鬼が踊る（前編）)	Koichiro Kuroda	Masaki Tsuji	November 2, 2013
The episode begins with three Noh masks museum employees conspiring to murder the museum curator. Detective Mouri, Ran and Conan show up at the museum explaining that they received a letter warning them that the museum curator's life is in danger. They meet the museum curator, his personal nurse, and his businessman acquaintance in the garden. Soon a heavy pile of logs roll out of the shed and almost crush the group. Other "accidents" occur until the businessman is poisoned and dies.
717	37	"Dancing Demon at the Noh Mask Mansion (Part 2)"; Transliteration: "Nōmen yashiki ni oni ga odoru (kōhen)" (Japanese: 能面屋敷に鬼が踊る（後編）)	Minoru Tozawa	Masaki Tsuji	November 9, 2013
While awaiting the police, more attempts to murder the museum curator occur. A fire breaks out and the group is locked inside one of the buildings. A woman wearing a mask resembling the conspiring ex-wife kills her two partners. The group manages to escape and calls the nurse over the internal phone to see if she and the curator are safe. The nurse reassures him, but then screams and hangs up. The group runs to the nurse's location and finds a scene with the nurse unconscious, the ex-wife stabbed to death, and the museum curator severely wounded. Inspectors conclude that the ex-wife tried to kill the curator, and that the nurse fought back in self-defense. Sleeping Kogoro reveals the nurse to be the true culprit. The curator survives thanks to Conan's earlier suggestion to wear armor under his clothes.
718	38	"The Devil's Circuit"; Transliteration: "Akuma no Kairo" (Japanese: 悪魔の回路)	Kenichi Takeshita	Nobuo Ogizawa	November 16, 2013
A mystery writer calls on Mouri Kogoro to investigate if there's anything going on between her husband and her assistant. Kogoro, Ran and Conan stay in a different house overnight and come morning, they find out all three people dead from poisoning. The husband dies first after eating poisoned sleeping pills. The assistant dies next after drinking poisoned tea. The writer dies last due to poisoned chocolate bars. Conan finds it odd that there is spilled water and two unopened chocolate bars in the garbage in the writer's room. Finally it is deduced that the writer initially planned to commit suicide by eating poisoned chocolate bars and stage it as a murder done by the husband and assistant, but after seeing that they are both dead, dies herself by eating the same chocolate bars by mistake.

== Home media release ==
Shogakukan/Being (Japan, Region 2 DVD)
Volume	Episodes^{Jp.}	Release date	Ref.
Volume 1	681-683, 686	January 24, 2014	
Volume 2	684–688	February 21, 2014	
Volume 3	689–691, 694	March 21, 2014	
Volume 4	692–693, 695–696	April 25, 2014	
Volume 5	697–700	May 23, 2014	
Volume 6	701–704	June 20, 2014	
Volume 7	705–708	July 25, 2014	
Volume 8	709–711, 718	August 22, 2014	
Volume 9	712–715	October 24, 2014	
