= Unmei no Roulette Mawashite =

1998 single by Zard

Single by Zard

from the album Eien
- Released: September 17, 1998
- Recorded: May–August 1998
- Studio: B.Gram-RECORDS
- Genre: J-pop; art pop; ambient rock; ethereal wave; alternative dance
- Label: B-Gram Records
- Composers: Seiichiro Kuribayashi (track 1); Aika Ohno (track 2)
- Lyricist: Izumi Sakai
- Producers: Daiko Nagato, ZARD

Zard singles chronology
"'Iki mo Dekinai'" (1998)	"Unmei no Roulette Mawashite" (1998)	"'Atarashii Door ~Fuyu no Himawari~'" (1998)

"Unmei no Roulette Mawashite" (運命のルーレット廻して, Spinning the Roulette of Destiny) is Zard's 25th single released on September 17, 1998, under B-Gram Records label. The single reached #1 rank during the first week after being released. It charted for 9 weeks and sold 247,000 copies. When Izumi Sakai died, it was elected as her fourth best song on the Oricon polls.

== Track list ==
All songs are written by Izumi Sakai and arranged by Daisuke Ikeda

1. Unmei no Roulette Mawashite (運命のルーレット廻して)
  - composer: Seiichiro Kuribayashi
  - OA(on air), single and album version have different arrangements
    - the song was used as 4th opening theme for anime Detective Conan
      - OA version of this song was fixed weekly during airings many times before its official release of single
      - OA ver. wasn't released until 2012 in Zard Album Collection in Premium Disc
2. Shōjo no Koro ni Modotta Mitai ni (少女の頃に戻ったみたいに)
  - composer: Aika Ohno
  - for first time Aika Ohno composed song for Zard
    - the song was used for Detective Conan Movie The Fourteenth Target as theme song
3. Unmei no Roulette Mawashite (運命のルーレット廻して) (Original karaoke)

== La PomPon version ==
"Unmei no Roulette Mawashite / Sayonara wa Hajimari no Kotoba"

Single by La PomPon

from the album Best of La PomPon
- B-side: "Sayonara wa Hajimari no Kotoba"
- Released: March 23, 2016
- Label: Being Inc.
- Composer: Seiichiro Kuribayashi
- Lyricist: Izumi Sakai

La PomPon singles chronology
"Nazo / Yada! Iyada! Yada! ~Sweet Teens ver.~" (2015)	"Unmei no Roulette Mawashite / Sayonara wa Hajimari no Kotoba" (2016)	"Omoide no Kyuujuu Kurihama / Koi no B・G・M ~Ima wa, Kataomoi~" (2016)

La PomPon would cover the song in 2016 as their third single, serving as the 50th ending theme of the Detective Conan series and was made in commemoration of Zard's 25th anniversary and the show's 20th anniversary.
