= La PomPon =

Japanese girl group

- Origin: Japan
- Genres: Japanese pop; Electropop; Dance-pop; Eurobeat
- Years active: 2013–2018
- Label: Being Inc.
- Past members: MISAKI; YUKINO; RIMA; HINA; KIRI; KAREN
- Website: lapompon.com

YouTube information
- Channel: La PomPon Channel
- Years active: 2014 - 2019
- Subscribers: 9.04 thousand
- Views: 9.1 million
- Last updated: September 10, 2025

La PomPon (ラ・ポンポン, Ra ponpon) was a Japanese pop girl group under the Being label in Being Inc. agency.

== Biography ==
In 2013, Being Inc. held an audition search for new talent, and six girls were chosen to form a new pop group. Each girl had their own color which represents themselves. Their name comes from the phrases "the Power of Music" (Pom), and "Pride of the New Generation" (Pon). In 2015, they made a major debut with their single "Bump!!". In February 2018, staff announced through their website that the group would be disbanding and after their final live in March 2018.

They've released six singles and one best album.

== Discography ==
=== Singles ===
	Release Day	Title	Peak
1st	2015/01/28	Bump!!	57
2nd	2015/04/29	Hot Girls	56
3rd	2015/09/16	Nazo/Yada Yada	8
4th	2016/03/23	Unmei no Roulette Mawashite/Sayonara wa Hajimari no Kotoba	12
5th	2016/09/7	Omoide no Kyuujuu Kurihama/Koi no BGM~ Ima wa, Kataomoi~	6
6th	2017/08/30	Feel Fine/Mr.Lonely Boy	19

=== Compilation album ===
	Release Day	Title	Peak
1st	2018/01/28	Best of La Pompon	35
