= Nazo (song) =

1997 song by Miho Komatsu

Single by Miho Komatsu

from the album Nazo?
- Released: May 28, 1997
- Recorded: 1997
- Genre: J-pop
- Length: 18:54
- Label: ZAIN Records
- Songwriter: Miho Komatsu
- Producers: ROCKAKU, Miho Komatsu

Miho Komatsu singles chronology
"Nazo" (1997)	"Kagayakeru Hoshi" (1997)

Nazo (謎; lit. 'Mystery') is the debut single of Japanese singer-songwriter Miho Komatsu. It was released on May 28, 1997, under Zain Records.

== Chart performance ==
The single reached number 9 in its first week and sold 40,230 copies. The single charted for 32 weeks and sold 325,850 copies overall. This was her highest sold single in her career up until then.

== In media ==
"Nazo" was used in anime Case Closed (Detective Conan) as third opening theme, although the single version differs from the on-air version. "Kotoba ni Dekinai" was used as ending theme for Nagoya TV program "Yoshimoto Gozensama Party".

== Track listing ==
All lyrics are written by Miho Komatsu; all music is composed by Miho Komatsu

No.	Title	Arrangers	Length
1.	"Nazo" (謎)	Hirohito Furui	4:39
2.	"Kotoba ni Dekinai" (言葉にできない)	Furui	3:59
3.	"Nazo" ((instrumental))	Furui	4:39
4.	"Kotoba ni Dekinai" ((instrumental))	Furui	3:59

== Other versions ==
The song was first covered in 2004 by Korean girl-group Jewelry in their single "Superstar" as coupling song in Korean language.

In 2008, Rina Aiuchi and U-ka Saegusa cover this song in their single "100 mono Tobira".

=== La PomPon cover ===
"Nazo / Yada! Iyada! Yada! ~Sweet Teens ver.~"

Single by La PomPon

from the album Best of La PomPon
- B-side: "Yada! Iyada! Yada! ~Sweet Teens ver.~"
- Released: September 16, 2015
- Recorded: 2015
- Genre: J-pop
- Length: 26:27
- Label: Being Inc.
- Songwriter: Miho Komatsu

La PomPon singles chronology
"HOT GIRLS" (2015)	"Nazo / Yada! Iyada! Yada! ~Sweet Teens ver.~" (2015)	"Unmei no Roulette Mawashite / Sayonara wa Hajimari no Kotoba" (2016)

In 2015, the Japanese pop girl group La PomPon covered the song as the 41st opening theme song of Detective Conan.
