= Knock Out Monkey =

- Origin: Japan, Kobe
- Genres: Rock; Alternative rock
- Occupations: Band
- Years active: 2001 - present
- Label: Being
- Members: w-shun dEnkA 亜太 (Ata) ナオミチ (Naomichi)
- Website: Official website

Knock Out Monkey (ノック・アウト・モンキー) is a four-member Japanese rock band signed to Being label. The band incorporates various sounds and genres, including reggae, hip-hop, metal, and emo.

Knock Out Monkey was founded in Kobe, Hyōgo Prefecture, in 2001; however, none of the founding members are with the band anymore. W-shun joined the band a while after its formation as the guitarist, and later on was also responsible for the vocals following the leave of their former vocalist. The band experienced several member changes until 2009; since then the current lineup is in place.

== Members ==
| Name | Role | Social media |
|---|---|---|
| w-shun | Vocal, Guitar | |
| dEnkA | Guitar | Twitter |
| 亜太 (Ata) | Bass | Twitter Instagram |
| ナオミチ (Naomichi) | Drums | Twitter Instagram |

== Discography ==
=== Studio albums ===
| Title | Details | Track listing |
|---|---|---|
| SKANK UP | Released: 2009.04.01; Label: SUNRED RECORDS | 1. SE; 2. Rising sun 3. mosh song 4. wanted 5. MONKEY DANCE; 6. FRIENDSHIP; 7. Carnival; 8. NO PAINS,NO GAINS; 9. jump around 10. WAY; 11. 星と自分; 12. E 13. A.K.2 |
| INPUT ∝ OUTPUT | Released: 2014.02.26; Label: B-Gram Records | 1. Prologue ～Battle against the Apes～; 2. I still 3. You have got freedom 4. Paint it Out!!!!; 5. Change; 6. The large world 7. Dear; 8. Challenge & Conflict; 9. Gun shot2 10. Flight; 11. Sunrise |
| Mr. Foundation | Released: 2015.01.14; Label: Being | 1. Revolution; 2. RIOT; 3. If you fly 4. Take you 5. How long?; 6. Priority; 7. Greed; 8. MOON; 9. 街 10. Our World; 11. ?; 12. Wonderful Life; 13. Eyes |
| HELIX | Released: 2017.07.05; Label: Being | 1. Louder; 2. Jump; 3. 1:48; 4. Dog; 5. fall down 6. cloud 9; 7. Reverse thinking 8. Wake Up; 9. Burning; 10. Do it 11. Run |

=== Mini-Albums ===
| Title | Details | Track listing |
|---|---|---|
| KING OF MUSIC | Released: 2008.03.26; Label: SUNRED RECORDS | 1. Remember; 2. INDY AIR; 3. fly 4. long time 5. what vibes 6. No.16; 7. A.K; 8. Thanks |
| 旅人 | Released: 2010.05.20; Label: VICESS | 1. 旅人; 2. Rising sun"Remastering ver." 3. INDY AIR"Remastering ver." 4. long time"Remastering ver." 5. WAY"Remastering ver." |
| One world | Released: 2010.07.07; Label: VICESS | 1. What's going on now 2. A.K3; 3. LION; 4. One world 5. カモメ; 6. PLAY |
| 0 → Future | Released: 2012.07.18; Label: magnifique | 1. BREAK; 2. JET; 3. Open your mind 4. 実りある日々; 5. 24; 6. Gun shot 7. HOPE |
| reality & liberty | Released: 2013.03.06; Label: magnifique | 1. Beginning (skit); 2. Scream & Shout; 3. Primal; 4. Blazin’; 5. Neverland; 6. ピエロの仮面; 7. TODAY; 8. Climber |
| RAISE A FIST | Released: 2016.01.06; Label: Being | 1. GOAL; 2. Flowers; 3. OH, NO; 4. A live 5. For the future 6. Walk |

=== Singles ===
| Title | Details | Track listing |
|---|---|---|
| HOPE | Released: 2012.03.14; Label: magnifique | 1. HOPE; 2. Bring it back 3. realize |
| Paint it Out!!!! | Released: 2013.10.02; Label: Being | 1. Paint it Out!!!!; 2. CRASH |
| Wonderful Life | Released: 2014.07.23; Label: Being | 1. Wonderful Life; 2. No Ending |
| Greed | Released: 2014.08.20; Label: Being | 1. Greed; 2. Only |
| How long? | Released: 2014.11.19; Label: Being | 1. How long?; 2. If you fly 3. TODAY ～another one～ |
| Bite | Released: 2015.05.06; Label: Being | 1. Bite |
| Do it | Released: 2016.11.16; Label: Being | 1. Do it 2. Jump; 3. HOME |
