= Valshe =

- Born: September 15, 1986 (age 39); Tokyo, Japan
- Genres: J-pop
- Occupations: Singer, lyricist
- Years active: 2009–present
- Labels: 5pb., Oth, Being Inc., S3CR LLC
- Website: valshe.tokyo

Valshe (バルシェ, Barushe; born September 15, 1986) is a Japanese singer, signed under the S3CR LLC label. She is well known as a "Ryōseirui" (両声類?, lit. "both voice types"), being able to sing both "male" and "female" voice types.

== Career ==
Valshe debuted as a Niconico singer in 2009. Occasionally her songs are made by the Vocaloid producer, doriko. She is also known to be good friends with the illustrator of Niconico, Hakuseki, who does almost all of the artwork for Valshe's albums and utattemita videos.

In the beginning of her career as a professional singer, Valshe used to appear as an avatar illustration (drawn by Hakuseki) with blonde hair and blue eyes. Her first appearance as herself is on the cover of her 6th single, "Butterfly Core". She released her first music video showing her own face for the song "Butterfly Core", which was featured on her 4th album V.D.

Valshe held her first live concert "Live the Joker 2013" at the Akasaka Act Theater on November 30, 2013.

Valshe voiced Hayato in the Japanese version of Fire Emblem Fates.

In August 2017 Valshe collaborated with Vocaloid producer Doriko on his compilation album Doriko 10th Anniversary Tribute with the song "Ame ka Yume" (飴か夢).

== Song appearances ==
- Valshe's second single "Jester" is the theme song of the PSP otome game Kannou Mukashibanashi and the ending theme of the TV variety show Akesaka Satomi no Aketere.
- The song "Another Sky" on the single "Jester" was used in the Xbox 360 game Ever17 as the grand ending theme.
- The song "Fragment" from her third single "Afflict" was the ending theme to the variety show Kiseki Taiken! Unbelievable.
- Her fifth single "Blessing Card" is the second ending theme of the TV anime Tanken Driland 1000-nen no Mahou,
- Her sixth single "Butterfly Core" is the 37th opening theme song of the anime Detective Conan.
- Her ninth single "Lie to You" is used as the 49th ending theme of the anime Detective Conan.
- Her tenth single "Montage" is used as the second opening theme song of the anime Nobunaga no Shinobi.
- Her eleventh single "Lapis Lazuli" is used as the ending theme of the otome game Majestic☆Magical.

== Discography ==
=== Albums ===
- Valuable Sheaves (March 24, 2010)
- Storyteller (September 23, 2010)
- Play the Joker (February 22, 2012)
- V.D. (February 19, 2014)
- Storyteller II: The Age Limits (September 24, 2014)
- Jiroku・Kumonoito (June 24, 2015)
- Display: Now&Best (September 23, 2015)
- Riot (July 27, 2016)
- Wonderful Curve(August 23, 2017)
- This Life, Is Gorgeous (August 22, 2018)
- PRESENT (April 1, 2020)
- UNIFY -10th Anniversary BEST- (November 25, 2020)
- ISM (December 22, 2021)
- SAGAS (March 21, 2023)
- storyteller III 〜THE SCARY STORIES〜 (September 18, 2024)
- VALSHE VALID-COVER ALBUM「REDESIGN」 (July 9, 2025)
- GASTRONOMY (September 10, 2025)

=== Singles ===
No.	Release date	Title	Catalog no.				Oricon rank
No.	Release date	Title	Ltd. edition A	Ltd. edition B	General release	Musing edition	Oricon rank
1st	2011-4-27	"Revolt e.p."	MHCL-1883		MHCL-1885		13th
2nd	2011-7-27	"Jester"	MHCL-1941		MHCL-1943		24th
3rd	2012-6-27	"Afflict / Fragment"	COCA-3801	COCA-3802	COCA-3803		16th
4th	2013-3-13	"4 Felids"	JBCZ-4001	JBCZ-4002	JBCZ-4003	JBCF-1001	17th
5th	2013-8-21	"Blessing Card"	JBCZ-4004		JBCZ-4005	JBCF-1002	30th
6th	2013-11-27	"Butterfly Core"	JBCZ-4006	JBCZ-4007	JBCZ-4008	JBCF-1003	23rd
7th	2014-7-16	"Transform / Marvelous Road"	JBCZ-4009	JBCZ-4010	JBCZ-4011	JBCF-1004	13th
8th	2014-9-24	"Trip×Trick"	JBCZ-6009		JBCZ-6010		27th
9th	2015-2-4	"君への嘘" (Lie to You)	JBCZ-6015	JBCZ-6016	JBCZ-4013	JBCF-1005	14th
10th	2017-2-8	"Montage"	JBCZ-4029	JBCZ-4030	JBCZ-4031	JBCF-1007	19th
11th	2018-3-21	"激情型カフネ/ラピスラズリ" (Passionate Cafuné / Lapis Lazuli)	JBCZ-4040	JBCZ-4041	JBCZ-4042		21st
12th	2019-5-22	"Sym-Bolic XXX"	JBCZ-4048	JBCZ-4049	JBCZ-4050		21st
13th	2019-11-20	"紅蓮" (Crimson)	JBCZ-6112		JBCZ-6113		23rd

=== Digital-exclusive singles ===
No.	Release date	Title
1st	2017-3-14	"White Prelude"

== See also ==
- Niconico
- Vocaloid
- Being Inc.
- 5pb. Records
- J-pop Artists starting with V
