= Mai Kuraki x Meitantei Conan Collaboration Best 21: Shinjitsu wa Itsumo Uta ni Aru! =

Fourth greatest hits album by Mai Kuraki

- Standard edition/digital download cover

Greatest hits album by Mai Kuraki
- Released: October 25, 2017
- Recorded: 2000–2017
- Genre: J-Pop; anime song; R&B
- Length: 44:25 (Disc 1); 45:43 (Disc 2)
- Label: Northern Music
- Producer: Mai Kuraki (exec.); Daiko Nagato

Mai Kuraki chronology
Smile (2017)	Mai Kuraki x Meitantei Conan Collaboration Best 21: Shinjitsu wa Itsumo Uta ni Aru! (2017)	Kimi Omou: Shunkashūtō (2018)

Singles from Mai Kuraki x Meitantei Conan Collaboration Best 21: Shinjitsu wa Itsumo Uta ni Aru!
- 1. "Togetsukyo (Kimi Omou)" Released: 12 April 2017

Mai Kuraki x Meitantei Conan Collaboration Best 21: Shinjitsu wa Itsumo Uta ni Aru! (倉木麻衣×名探偵コナン COLLABORATION BEST 21 -真実はいつも歌にある！-) is the fourth greatest hits album by Japanese singer-songwriter Mai Kuraki. It was released on 25 October 2017 by Northern Music, in celebration of Kuraki's long-time collaboration with the Japanese animation Case Closed. The album features all the songs Kuraki had written for the animation.

== Chart performance ==
In Japan, the album debuted at number four on the Oricon Weekly Albums Chart, selling 25,819 copies in its first week. The album also debuted at number four on the Billboard Japan Hot Albums Chart. The album was announced as Japan's 86th biggest selling album of the year.

The first single from Mai Kuraki x Meitantei Conan Collaboration Best 21: Shinjitsu wa Itsumo Uta ni Aru!, "Togetsukyo (Kimi Omou)" was released in April 2017 and peaked at number two on the Billboard Japan Hot 100 chart. The song has sold over 250,000 download copies and 76,146 physical copies, making it her best-selling CD single in decade and the most downloaded song in her career.

== Track listing ==
All lyrics are written by Mai Kuraki.

Disc 1
No.	Title	Music	Arranger(s)	Length
1.	"Secret of My Heart"	Aika Ohno	Cybersound	4:24
2.	"Start In My Life"	Ohno	Cybersound	4:39
3.	"Always"	Ohno	Cybersound	4:07
4.	"Winter Bells"	Akihito Tokunaga	Tokunaga	4:37
5.	"Time After Time (Hana Mau Machi de)" (Time after time ～花舞う街で～)	Ohno	Daisuke Ikeda; Cybersound	3:58
6.	"Kaze no La La La" (風のららら)	Michiya Haruhata	Cybersound	4:22
7.	"Growing of My Heart"	Ohno	Takeshi Hayama	4:20
8.	"Shiroi Yuki" (白い雪)	Ohno	Daisuke Ikeda	4:47
9.	"Ichibyōgoto ni Love for You" (一秒ごとに Love for you)	Ohno	Cybersound	3:57
10.	"Revive"	Ohno	Miguel Sá Pessoa	4:39
Total length:				44:25

Disc 2
No.	Title	Music	Arranger(s)	Length
1.	"Togetsukyo (Kimi Omou)" (渡月橋 〜君 想ふ〜)	Tokunaga	Tokunaga	4:08
2.	"Yesterday Love"	Daiko Nagato	Nagato	4:56
3.	"Sawage☆Life"	Alaina Beaton; Bobby Huff	Taito	3:21
4.	"Dynamite"	Tesung Kim; Coach & Sendo; Katerina Bramley	Coach & Sendo	3:21
5.	"Muteki na Heart" (無敵なハート)	Takahiro Hiraga; Yue Mochizuki	Shun Satou; Jinichi Tajiri	3:24
6.	"Try Again"	Tokunaga	Cybersound	4:25
7.	"Koi ni Koishite" (恋に恋して)	Giorgia Cancemi	Cybersound	4:09
8.	"Your Best Friend"	Cancemi	Cancemi	5:50
9.	"Tomorrow is the last Time"	Ohno	Hayama	3:58
10.	"Summer Time Gone"	Ohno	Takeshi	4:34
11.	"Puzzle"	Mochizuki; Hiraga	Masazumi Ozawa	4:39
Total length:				45:43

Limited edition bonus DVD
No.	Title	Length
1.	"Case Closed OP and ED movies" (Non-subtitle version)

== Detective Conan theme songs in media ==
- "Secret of my heart" was used as the 9th ending theme
- "Start in my life" was used as the 11th ending theme
- "Always" was used as the 12th ending theme and as the theme song for its 5th movie Countdown to Heaven
- "Winter Bells" was used as the 10th opening theme
- "Time After Time" was used as the theme song for its 7th movie Crossroad in the Ancient Capital
- "Kaze no La La La" was used as the 12th opening theme
- "Growing of my heart" was used as the 16th opening theme
- "Shiroi Yuki" was used as the 26th ending theme
- "Ichibyou Goto ni Love for you" was used as the 23rd opening theme
- "Revive" was used as the 25th opening theme
- "Puzzle" was used as the theme song for its 13th movie The Raven Chaser
- "Summer Time Gone" was used as the 29th opening theme
- "Tomorrow is the last time" was used as the 36th ending theme
- "Your Best Friend" was used as the 40th ending theme
- "Koi ni Koishite" was used as the 43rd ending theme
- "Try Again" was used as the 35th opening theme
- "Muteki na Heart" was used as the 48th ending theme
- "Dynamite" was used as the 39th opening theme and being one of the theme songs in TV special The Disappearance of Conan Edogawa: The Worst Two Days in History
- "Sawage Life" was used as the 52nd ending theme
- "Yesterday Love" was used as the 53rd ending theme
- "Togetsukyo -Kimi Omou-" was used as the 55th ending theme and the theme song for its 21st movie The Crimson Love Letter

== Charts ==
=== Daily charts ===
Chart (2017)	Peak position
Japanese Albums Chart	3

=== Weekly charts ===
Chart (2017)	Peak position
Oricon Albums Chart	4
Billboard Japan Albums Chart	4

=== Monthly charts ===
Chart (2017)	Peak position
Japanese Albums Chart	11

=== Yearly charts ===
Chart (2017)	Peak position
Japanese Albums (Billboard Japan)	86
Japanese Albums (Oricon)	89

Chart (2018)	Peak position
Japanese Albums (Billboard Japan)	100

== Release history ==
Region	Date	Version	Format	Label
Various	October 25, 2017	Standard	Digital download	Northern Music
Various	October 25, 2017	Standard	CD	Northern Music
Various	October 25, 2017	Limited	CD+DVD	Northern Music
Various	December 29, 2017	Standard	CD (Limited gold cover version)	Northern Music
Various	December 29, 2017	Limited	CD+DVD (Limited gold cover version)	Northern Music
Various	January 2, 2019	Limited (Special Edition)	CD+DVD	Northern Music
Various	March 6, 2021	Standard	Streaming	Northern Music
