= Mai Kuraki =

Japanese J-pop singer (born 1982)

Mai Kuraki 倉木 麻衣
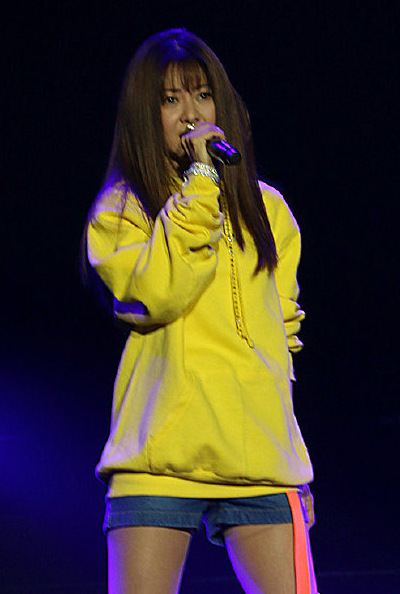
- Kuraki in 2019

Background information
- Also known as: Mai K
- Born: Mai Aono (青野 真衣); October 28, 1982 (age 43); Funabashi, Chiba, Japan
- Genres: J-pop; R&B
- Occupations: Singer; songwriter
- Years active: 1999–present
- Labels: Giza Studio; Northern; East West; Bip!
- Website: mai-kuraki.com

YouTube information
- Channel: MaiKuraki
- Years active: 2006–present
- Subscribers: 197 thousand
- Views: 137.914.719
- Last updated: 26 June 2026

Mai Kuraki (倉木 麻衣, Kuraki Mai) (born October 28, 1982) is a Japanese pop and R&B singer. After releasing her US debut single "Baby I Like" in 1999, Kuraki signed with Giza Studio and released her Japanese debut single "Love, Day After Tomorrow" in 1999. In 2000, she released her debut album, Delicious Way, which debuted at number-one and sold over 2.2 million copies in its first week. The album has spawned four top-three singles, "Love, Day After Tomorrow", "Stay by My Side", "Secret of My Heart", and "Never Gonna Give You Up". Eventually, the album sold over 3.5 million copies nationwide and became the best-selling album in Japan of 2000, and has been the ninth best-selling album in Japan of all-time.

Her second album, Perfect Crime (2001) debuted atop in Japan and has sold over 1.3 million copies nationwide. After the success in Japan, Kuraki targeted the American market again, with the English-language studio album Secret of My Heart (2002), however it failed to enter any charts in the United States. Her third Japanese album, Fairy Tale was released in 2002 and topped the Oricon albums chart. The album has spawned one number-one song, "Winter Bells". Her fourth album, If I Believe become her fourth consecutive number-one album in Japan. Her first compilation album, Wish You the Best (2004) sold nearly a million copies and became the seventh best-selling album of 2004 in Japan. Kuraki's succeeding albums, Fuse of Love (2005), Diamond Wave (2006), and One Life (2008) were released to less commercial success.

In 2009, Kuraki saw a revival in her popularity with the increased television appearances and the promotion. Her eighth studio album, Touch Me!, debuted atop in Japan, becoming her first number-one album in five years. Her second compilation album, All My Best (2009) topped the chart in Japan, making her one of the two artists who sent two albums at the top spot on the chart in the year. Her next studio albums, Future Kiss (2010) and Over the Rainbow (2012) both reached top three in Japan. Her third compilation album, Mai Kuraki Best 151A: Love & Hope (2014) managed to peak at number two in Japan and became the ninety-fifth best-selling album in Japan of the year. Her eleventh studio album, Smile (2017) sold less than her previous albums, partly due to the lack of the promotion.

Released in 2017, the single "Togetsukyo (Kimi Omou)" peaked at number two in Japan and became the best-selling single for a solo female artist in 2017. The single marked Kuraki's second revival in charts, succeeded by the compilation album, Mai Kuraki x Meitantei Conan Collaboration Best 21: Shinjitsu wa Itsumo Uta ni Aru! (2017), which peaked at number four in Japan and charted on the year-end album chart in 2017 and 2018. Her twelfth and thirteenth albums, Kimi Omou: Shunkashūtō (2018) and Let's Goal!: Barairo no Jinsei (2019) were both moderate success, reaching top three in Japan. Her fifth compilation album, Mai Kuraki Single Collection: Chance for You was released in 2019, in celebration of her 20th anniversary. In 2021, Kuraki released her fourteenth studio album Unconditional Love, which peaked at number four in Japan and spawned a number-one single "Zero kara Hajimete". Her first extended play Forever for You was released in 2024 to commercial success, reaching number three in Japan.

Kuraki is best known for singing theme songs for the Japanese television anime series, Case Closed aka detective conan. As of October 2020, she has recorded twenty-three songs for the series and earning her a Guinness World Record for singing the most theme songs for the same television series. Kuraki also holds the record for being the only female artist to have all of her singles consecutively debut in the Top 10 since her debut in 1999, and is the 38th best-selling Japanese music artist of all time. To date, Kuraki has seven number-one albums (five originals and two compilations) and two number-one singles.

== Biography ==
=== Early life and career beginnings ===
Mai Kuraki was born on October 28, 1982, to entrepreneur, film director and actor, Isomi Yamasaki. Her grandfather is Saneharu Yamasaki, a poet, and her aunt is Reiko Takizawa, an actor. Upon hearing Whitney Houston's music and seeing the dance moves of Michael Jackson, Kuraki dreamed to be a singer. While in high school, with the help of her father, who was a friend of the music label, Giza Studio, Kuraki sent a demo tape to the label and contracted a record deal with them. However, before Kuraki made her debut in Japan, she made her American debut. Under Giza USA and Bip! Records, Kuraki released the single, "Baby I Like" under the stage name Mai K. The cover of Yoko Black. Stone song, even impressed executives from the major label East West Records, prompting the label to distribute it. However, the song failed to chart on the Billboard charts and Giza sent her back to Japan.

=== 2000–2001: Delicious Way and Perfect Crime ===
After coming back to Japan, Kuraki began working on her J-pop materials. She released her Japan debut single, "Love, Day After Tomorrow", on December 8, 1999. The single entered the Oricon single chart at number 18, and eventually peaked at number 2, selling 1.4 million copies and becoming the fourth best-selling single of 2000 in Japan. In June 2000, Kuraki's debut studio album, Delicious Way was released to a commercial success, debuting at number one in Japan and selling 2,210,000 copies in its first week, which still has been the biggest first week sales for the debut album in Japan as of 2020. Delicious Way has sold over three million copies and was certified 3x million as well as won "Rock album of the Year" at the 16th annual Japan Gold Disc Awards. As of 2020, the album remains as the ninth best-selling album in Japan. The album has spawned three other singles, "Stay by My Side", "Secret of My Heart", and "Never Gonna Give You Up", all of which reached top three in Japan. "Secret of My Heart" won a Japan Gold Disc Award for "Song of the Year" and was chosen as the theme song to the television anime series, Case Closed, for which Kuraki would be known for singing the multiple theme songs. In 2000, Kuraki sent six singles inside the top 100 on the Oricon Yearly Singles chart.

In July 2001, Kuraki released her second album, Perfect Crime. The album sold over 800,000 copies in its first week and debuted atop on the Oricon chart. The album has sold over 1.3 million copies and been certified Million by the Recording Industry Association of Japan (RIAJ). Perfect Crime won "Rock album of the Year". The album has spawned six singles, including platinum-certified singles, "Reach for the Sky", "Tsumetai Umi"/"Start in My Life", and "Stand Up". In August 2000, Kuraki embarked on her first promotional tour, Sokenbicha Natural Breeze 2001 Happy Live, supported by Coca-Cola, as their advertising campaign for their brand, Sokenbicha.

=== 2002: Secret of My Heart and Fairy Tale ===
In January 2002, Kuraki released her first English-language album, Secret of My Heart in the United States. The album included the English versions of her hit songs as well as her US single, "Baby I Like". Like the single, Secret of My Heart commercially failed in the US market. In the same month, Kuraki embarked on her first nationwide headlining tour, Mai Kuraki "Loving You..." Tour 2002. The fourteen-show tour was attended by approximately 150,000 audience. In April, Kuraki signed a promotional deal with Shiseido for their brand, Sea Breeze. her song, "Feel Fine!" was used for their television commercial, in which Kuraki herself appeared. In June 2002, Kuraki made her television appearance, performing at the 2002 FIFA World Cut Official Concert Korea/Japan Day with the other artists such as Lauryn Hill and Ken Hirai.

Her third studio album, Fairy Tale was released in October 2002. The album debuted at number one in Japan, and has sold over 730,000 copies nationwide. The album has spawned four top-three singles, "Can't Forget Your Love", "Feel Fine!", "Like a Star in the Night", and "Winter Bells", which peaked at number one in Japan. Fairy Tale won the "Rock & Pop album of the Year" award at the Japan Gold Disc Awards. In the same month, Kuraki embarked on the Mai Kuraki Fairy Tale Tour 02–03 in support of the album. In December 2002, Kuraki published her first autobiographical book, Myself Music.

=== 2003–2004: If I Believe and Wish You the Best ===
Kuraki released her fourth studio album, If I Believe, in July 2003. The album debuted at number one in Japan and has sold over 445,000 copies nationwide. If I Believe has yielded four singles, "Make My Day", "Time After Time: Hana Mau Machi de", "Kiss" and "Kaze no La La La", all of which reached number three in Japan. In October 2003, Kuraki was featured as a guest vocalist for Tak Matsumoto's single, "Imitation Gold", the cover of Momoe Yamaguchi. The single debuted at number one and has sold over 80,000 copies, earning Matsumoto his first number one single. The song was included on his eighth studio album, The Hit Parade (2003). In December 2003, Kuraki made her first appearance at the Kōhaku Uta Gassen and performed "Stay by My Side" at Tō-ji in Kyoto.

Wish You the Best, her first compilation album was released on the New Year's Day of 2004. The album became her fifth consecutive number-one album and has been certified million by RIAJ, although the album entirely consisted of previously released songs. In April 2004, Kuraki embarked on the Mai Kuraki 2004 Live Tour Wish You the Best: Grow, Step by Step. The tour was attended by the audience of 117,000. In December 2004, Kuraki performed her single, ""Ashita e Kakeru Hashi" (明日へ架ける橋) at the Kōhaku Uta Gassen.

=== 2005–2006: Fuse of Love and Diamond Wave ===
Her fifth studio album, Fuse of Love was released in August 2005. The album failed to match the success of her previous albums, only peaking at number three on the Oricon chart, while it managed to enter the Taiwan's newly established G-Music chart at number thirteen. Fuse of Love has spawned four singles, including three top five singles: "Ashita e Kakeru Hashi", "Love, Needing" and "Dancing". The music video of "Dancing" was directed by Nigel Dick, who also directed the music video of the artists like Britney Spears, Guns N' Roses, and Backstreet Boys. The album was later certified gold by the RIAJ and has sold over 185,000 copies nationwide. Kuraki embarked on the Mai Kuraki Live Tour 2005 Like a Fuse of Love, in September 2005. In December 2005, Kuraki made her third appearance at the Kōhaku Uta Gassen, perfotming her debut single, "Love, Day After Tomorrow".

In August 2006, Kuraki released her sixth studio album, Diamond Wave. The album was a moderate success, peaking at number three in Japan and number thirteen in Taiwan. It has sold over 132,000 copies and has certified gold by the RIAJ. Diamond Wave has spawned three top ten singles: "Growing of My Heart", "Best of Hero" (ベスト オブ ヒーロー), and "Diamond Wave". From August 2006 to November 2006, Kuraki embarked on the Mai Kuraki Live Tour 2006 Diamond Wave to promote the album.

=== 2007-2009: One Life, Touch Me!, and All My Best ===
In June 2007, Kuraki left Giza Studio in Osaka and made a new record contract with the newly founded record label, Northern Music in Tokyo, although the labels are both under the Being Inc, group. On 7 June 2007, Kuraki performed "Born to Be Free" at the A3 Champions Cup 2007 in Shandong, China. On 16 June 2007, she performed "Secret of My Heart" at the Golden Melody Awards in Taiwan as the representative artist from Japan. In September 2007, Kuraki made her first appearance at the Asia Song Festival in Seoul, South Korea. Kuraki embarked on the promotional tour, Mai Kuraki Live Tour 2007 Be With U in December 2007. In January 2008, Kuraki released her seventh studio album, One Life. The album failed to reach top ten in Japan, only peaking at number fourteen, partly due to the chart system of Oricon. The album peaked at number twelve in Taiwan and has been sold over 89,000 copies in Japan, certified gold by the RIAJ. One Life has spawned four top ten singles, "Shiroi Yuki", "Season of Love", and "Silent Love: Open My Heart"/"Be With U".

In October 2008, Kuraki embarked on the Mai Kuraki Live Tour 2008 "Touch Me!" to promote her then unreleased eighth studio album, Touch Me!. The album was released in January 2009. Kuraki made her first appearance on the music television program, Music Station, where she performed the album's title track, "Touch Me!", to promote the album. This performance became Kuraki's first performance on the television program, aside the Kōhaku Uta Gassen. The album was a commercial success, the album debuted at number one in Japan, earning her first number one album in five years, since the release of Wish You the Best (2004). It has sold over 90,000 copies nationwide and been certified gold by the RIAJ. The album also peaked at number twelve in Taiwan. Touch Me! has spawned four top ten singles, "Yume ga Saku Haru"/"You and Music and Dream", "Ichibyōgoto ni Love for You", and "24 Xmas Time". The title track also charted in Japan, peaking at number sixteen on the Billboard Japan Hot 100, despite not being released as a single. In April 2009, Kuraki was featured as a guest vocalist on ZARD's posthumous single, "Sunao ni Ienakute", The single peaked at number 5 in Japan, selling over 36,000 copies nationwide.

In July 2009, Kuraki embarked on the Asia tour, titled 10th Anniversary Mai Kuraki Tour 2009 "Best", in celebration of her tenth debut. Her second compilation album, All My Best was released to a commercial success, debuting atop on the Oricon chart, making her among the two artists who sent two albums atop on the chart in 2009, the other being Greeeen. The album has sold over 250,000 copies nationwide and been certified platinum by the RIAJ, as well as enter the year-end album chart at number twenty-five. The album has spawned two top three singles, "Puzzle" and "Beautiful". The lead track from the album, "Watashi no, Shiranai, Watashi." was used in the television commercials for the cosmetic company, Kosé, in which she was featured as a model. The song peaked at number twenty on the Billboard Japan Hot 100, even though it was not released as a single. The double A-side single, "Puzzle"/"Revive" became Kuraki's first top three single in 5 years since "Ashita e Kakeru Hashi" (2004). On 31 October 2009, Kuraki held a Halloween concert, titled 10th Anniversary Mai Kuraki Live Tour 2009 "Best" Happy Happy Halloween Live at Nippon Budokan. "Puzzle" was used as the ending theme for the thirteenth movie Detective Conan: The Raven Chaser, while "Revive" was used as the twenty-fifth opening theme song for the TV series.

=== 2010–2012: Future Kiss and Over the Rainbow ===
In March 2010, Kuraki released the double A-side single, "Eien Yori Nagaku"/"Drive Me Crazy". The former was used in the television commercial for Kosé, while the latter was used as the Japanese theme song to the American television series, Heroes Season 3. The single peaked at number four in Japan and fifteen in Taiwan. In November 2010, her ninth studio album, Future Kiss was released. The album debuted at number three and has sold over 65,000 copies in Japan. It also peaked at number eleven in Taiwan, making her highest-charting album in the country to date. The album has spawned four top five singles, "Revive", "Beautiful", "Drive Me Crazy", and "Summer Time Gone". The title track of the album was performed on the several television programs including SMAP×SMAP and Music Station, making it peak at number thirteen on the Billboard Japan Hot 100. Another song from the album, "Tomorrow Is the Last Time" was used as the theme song to the anime, Case Closed and charted on the RIAJ Digital Track Chart at number forty-two. In November 2010, Kuraki performed at Kamigamo Shrine in Kyoto, the UNESCO World Heritage Site, as a part of the Tokyo FM's 40th anniversary campaign.

In March 2011, Kuraki sang the national anthem at the soccer charity match, titled "The Tohoku Earthquake recovery support charity match Ganbarou Nippon!", at Yanmar Stadium Nagai, Osaka. The match was held again in August 2011, where Kuraki performed the anthem. In April 2011, she released a single titled "Anata ga Irukara", which she dedicated to the victims of the 2011 Tōhoku earthquake and tsunami. The song was re-released in August as a video single, featuring the performance by a professional figure skater, Shizuka Arakawa. The proceeds from all versions of the song were donated to the Japanese Red Cross Society to benefit the victims and the reconstruction in the disaster area. In June 2011, Kuraki was featured on Nerdhead's single, "Doushite Suki nandaro?" under the name, Mai-K. The song peaked at number fifteen in Japan. In August 2011, Sanrio announced their collaboration with Northern Music for the creation of one of the characters of Wish me mell, Maimai. Maimai is officially based on Kuraki herself in collaboration with Sanrio, and she released the series' official image song "Stay the Same". In October 2011, Kuraki held a charity concert titled Mai Kuraki Premium Live One for All, All for One at Nippon Budokan. The concert was supported by the musicians such as Tokyo Philharmonic Orchestra, Alex Ru, and Nerdhead. In November 2011, Kuraki released her first video single, "Strong Heart". The single peaked at number seven and three in Japan and Taiwan respectively. The part of the proceeds were donated to reconstract the disaster area of 2011 Tōhoku earthquake and tsunami. In January 2012, her tenth studio album Over the Rainbow was released. The album debuted at number two in Japan and has sold approximately 50,000 copies nationwide. Over the Rainbow was preceded by four top ten singles, "1000 Mankai no Kiss", "Mou Ichido", "Your Best Friend", and "Strong Heart". From the same month, she embarked on the Mai Kuraki Live Tour 2012: Over the Rainbow in support of the album. In April 2012, Kuraki won The Most Popular Asian Influential Japanese Singer at the 2012 Channel V "Migu" Chinese Music Award, which was held in Macau. In June 2012, she signed a promotional deal with NGW Japan to promote their bottled mineral water series, Ice Field. In September 2012, Kuraki held her first orchestral concert titled Mai Kuraki Symphonic Live -Opus 1- at Tokyo Metropolitan Theatre. In December 2012, she released an orchestral compilation album, Mai Kuraki Symphonic Collection in Moscow. The lead track from the album, "Hakanasa" was chosen as the Japanese theme song to the Chinese fantasy film, Painted Skin and the television series adapted from the film.

=== 2013–2014: Mai Kuraki Best 151A: Love & Hope ===
In February 2013, Kuraki released a single "Try Again", which was used as the theme song to the anime series Case Closed. The single peaked at number seven and managed to enter G-Music J-Pop chart at number three. In June 2013, Kuraki embarked on the national tour titled Mai Kuraki Live Project 2013 "Re:". In September 2013, she held her second orchestral concert, Mai Kuraki Symphonic Live -Opus 2- in Tokyo. In March 2014, as a part of JICA's Nantokashinakya! Project, Kuraki visited Siem Reap, Cambodia to support and help education system in Cambodia. After the visit, Kuraki started the project to raise fund to found a school in Trei Nhoar, Puok District, Cambodia. In February 2016, the project was completed, and Trey Nhoar Community Learning Center was founded. From June 2014, Kuraki embarked on two tours, 15th Anniversary Mai Kuraki Live Project 2014 Best "151A": Fun Fun Fun and 15th Anniversary Mai Kuraki Live Project 2014 Best 151A: Muteki na Heart. During the former tour, Kuraki performed at the relatively small music venues while she performed at the music halls during the latter tour. In November 2014, Kuraki released her third compilation album Mai Kuraki Best 151A: Love & Hope in celebration of her fifteenth debut anniversary. The album peaked at number two in Japan and has sold over 67,000 copies, certified gold by the RIAJ. It also chart in Taiwan at number nineteen. Mai Kuraki Best 151A: Love & Hope has yielded six top ten singles, "Koi ni Koishite"/"Special Morning Day to You", "Try Again", "Wake Me Up", "Muteki na Heart"/"Stand by You".

=== 2015–2017: Smile and "Togetsukyo (Kimi Omou)" ===
In May 2015, Kuraki released a promotional single "Serendipity" in celebration of 40th anniversary of West Japan Railway Company's San'yō Shinkansen. The single debuted at number six on the Recochoku weekly chart. In November 2015, Kuraki and other musicians including Kazufumi Miyazawa, Tetsuya Takeda, and Ai Kawashima recorded the charity single "Hitori, Hitotsu" to support the Japan Overseas Cooperation Volunteers. In April 2016, Kuraki held her first concert in Russia, at the Mariinsky Theatre. In May 2016, Kuraki signed an ambassador deal with Nihon Unisys and wrote the image song to the company, "Make That Change". In September 2016, Kuraki embarked on the China tour, Mai Kuraki "Time After Time" Chine Live Tour. In January 2017, Kuraki released "Yesterday Love" as the first VR single in Japan. In the following month, her first studio album in five years, Smile was released to a minor commercial success. The album managed to peak at number four and has sold over 29,000 copies in Japan. The album was preceded by one single, "Yesterday Love", and two promotional singles, "Serendipity" and "Sawage Life". To promote the album, Kuraki embarked on the Mai Kuraki Live Project 2017 Sawage Live.

In April 2017, Kuraki released the single "Togetsukyo (Kimi Omou)", the ending theme for the animated film Detective Conan: Crimson Love Letter. The song instantly entered the major music charts in Japan, selling about 30,000 physical copies in its first week. "Togetsukyo (Kimi Omou)" peaked at number two on the Billboard Japan Hot 100 and number five on the Oricon Weekly Singles Chart. Finally it sold over 76,000 physical copies and became her best-selling song since her 2004 single "Ashita e Kakeru Hashi". Finally the song became the best-selling single by a solo female musician in Japan, and fifty-second overall. Also, the song sold over 250,000 digital copies and became her most downloaded song since her debut, certified as platinum by the RIAJ. On July 25, 2017, she was awarded a Guinness World Record for singing the most theme songs in a single anime series (Case Closed). Kuraki's fourth compilation album Mai Kuraki x Meitantei Conan Collaboration Best 21: Shinjitsu wa Itsumo Uta ni Aru!, a collaboration with Case Closed, was released on October 25, 2017. The album was a commercial success, peaking at number four and selling over 79,000 copies in Japan. In December 2017, Kuraki made her first appearance at the Kōhaku Uta Gassen in twelve years, performing "Togetsukyo (Kimi Omou)".

=== 2018–2020: Kimi Omou: Shunkashūtō and Let's Goal!: Barairo no Jinsei ===
In September 2018, Kuraki appeared on the television commercials of Kyoto City, as an Kyoto sightseeing ambassador. In October 2018, Kuraki was chosen as an image character for the department store chain Parco, for their Chinese New Year campaign. In the same month, Kuraki released her first concept album, Kimi Omou: Shunkashūtō. The album peaked at number three and has sold approximately 30,000 copies in Japan. The album has spawned five singles, "Togetsukyo (Kimi Omou)", "We Are Happy Women", "Do It!", "Light Up My Life", and "Koyoi wa Yume wo Misasete". From 13 October 2018, she embarked on the Mai Kuraki Live Project 2018 "Red It Be": Kimi Omou Shunkashūtō to promote the album. "Light Up My Life" served as the theme song to the Japanese tactical role-playing game, Valkyria Chronicles IV.

In March 2019, Kuraki released a double A-side single "Kimi to Koi no Mama de Owarenai Itsumo Yume no Mama ja Irarenai"/"Barairo no Jinsei". Both songs served as the theme songs to the special episodes of Case Closed, "The Scarlet School Trip", on which Kuraki appeared as a voice actor. The song peaked at number four, becoming her forty-second consecutive top ten CD single since her debut "Love, Day After Tomorrow", extending her record for being the only female artist in Japan to do so. In celebration of 20th anniversary of debut, Kuraki embarked on the Asia tour 20th Anniversary Mai Kuraki Live Project 2019 in Asia from July 2019. In August 2019, she released her thirteenth studio album Let's Goal!: Barairo no Jinsei. The album debuted at number three and has sold over 29,000 copies in Japan. In support of the album, she embarked on the tour, 20th Anniversary Mai Kuraki Live Project 2019 "Let's Goal!: Barairo no Jinsei" from August to November 2019.

In December 2019, Kuraki released her fifth compilation album Mai Kuraki Single Collection: Chance for You. The album peaked at number six and has sold over 29,000 copies in Japan. The four-disc single collection was mastered by the Grammy-nominated/winning engineers, Ryan Smith, Chris Gehringer, Randy Merrill, Joe LaPorta, and Ted Jensen. In October 2020, Kuraki wrote All at Once's song, "Just Believe You", which also sampled Kuraki's single, "Secret of My Heart".

=== 2021–present: Unconditional Love ===
On 6 March 2021, Kuraki released the first single in approximately two years, "Zero kara Hajimete". The song was written in celebration of the 1000th episode of the anime television series, Case Closed. On the same day, the songs which Kuraki wrote for the anime were released on streaming platforms such as Spotify and Apple Music. In June, "Zero kara Hajimete" was re-released as a video single. The single topped on the Oricon Weekly DVD chart, becoming Kuraki's first number-one on the chart since Mai Kuraki Clip & Live Selection "My Reflection" debuted atop in January 2004.

In August 2021, Kuraki announced the release of her thirteenth studio album, Unconditional Love. The singer will also embark on the tour, Mai Kuraki Live Project 2021 in support of the album.

From 26 April 2024 to 6 May 2024, to celebrate the 25th anniversary since Kuraki's debut on 8 December 1999, the exhibition titled Kuraki Mai 25th Anniversary "2525" Museum was held at Tokyu Plaza Ginza in Tokyo. In August 2024, Kuraki released her first extended play, Forever for You In support of the album and to commemorate her 25th anniversary of her debut, Kuraki embarked on the tour, 25th Anniversary Mai Kuraki Live Project 24-25 "Be Alright!", playing in several Asian cities including Tokyo, Shanghai and Taipei.

== Artistry ==
=== Influences ===
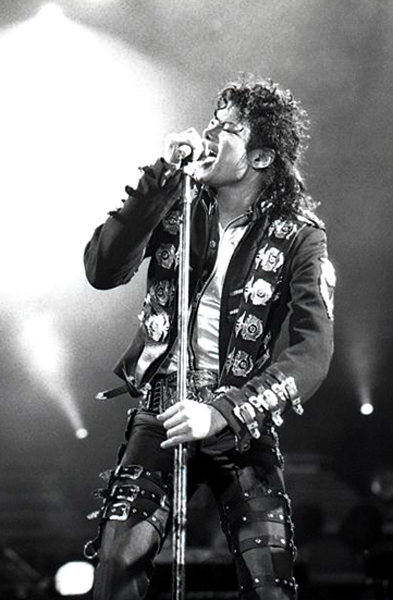
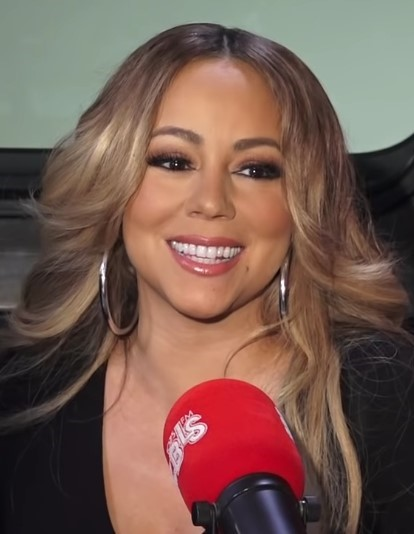
Kuraki credits artists such as Michael Jackson (left) and Mariah Carey (right) as major musical influences

Kuraki has cited Michael Jackson, Mariah Carey, Whitney Houston, and Lauryn Hill as being major influence in her career. She cites the live performance of Houston and the music videos of Jackson as the mains reasons why she started to dream of becoming a singer. In the interview with Natalie, Kuraki stated that she practiced vibrato, singing "Man in the Mirror" by Jackson. She has covered several songs from Jackson's discography, including "I'll Be There", "Smile", and "I Just Can't Stop Loving You". In the 2014 interview with Barks, Kuraki told that she sang "Grace of My Heart", a song by the Japanese girl group MAX at the audition. Kuraki also named Michael Bublé, Shakira, Christina Aguilera, Janet Jackson, Stacie Orrico, Britney Spears, and Jennifer Lopez as sources of inspiration.

Kuraki has been cited by many musicians as their main influence. Shizuka, a former member of E-girls and Mikako Komatsu have cited Kuraki as one of their major influence. Yui sang "Like a Star in the Night" and Ai Takahashi sang "Tsumetai Umi" for their auditions.

=== Musical style ===
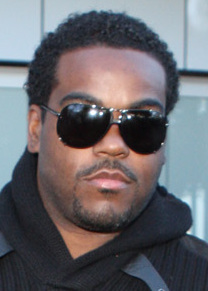
Kuraki has enlisted artists such as Rodney Jerkins (left) and Fernando Garibay (right) as the writers

Kuraki's songs are often written and produced by the fellow musicians from her label, Being Group, such as Aika Ohno, Akihito Tokunaga, and Yoko Blaqstone, and Cybersound, an engineering team in Boston and Michael Africk. Kuraki frequently blends elements of J-pop, R&B, dance, and sometimes rock into her songs, and her records typically include a combination of ballads and uptempo tracks. Following her debut, Kuraki was credited with influencing the revival of R&B in Japan of the late 1990s and the early 2000s. Other musicians in the field counts Misia, Hikaru Utada, and Yuki Koyanagi. Delicious Way (2000) prominently displayed R&B and J-pop sound, while Perfect Crime (2001) incorporates rock sound, as seen on "Stand Up" and "Come On! Come On!". Her third studio album Fairy Tale (2002) adopted a wide range of genres, including surf rock on "Feel Fine!" and Christmas music on "Winter Bells", while sticking to the R&B sounds. On her fourth studio album If I Believe (2003), Kuraki mixed the elements of R&B, J-pop and kayokyoku on "Time After Time (Hana Mau Machi de)". On the album, she recorded a song, "Tonight, I Feel Close to You" with a Singaporean singer Stefanie Sun.

Her fifth and sixth studio albums Fuse of Love (2005) and Diamond Wave (2006) saw the drastic change in her musical style, diverting into the teen pop and J-pop sounds throughout the entire albums. Kuraki returned to R&B sound on her seventh studio album, One Life (2008). For the album, Kuraki listed some musicians outside of Being Group, including Martin Ankelius and Daisuke Miyachi. For Touch Me! (2009), Kuraki worked with R&B, J-pop, hip hop music, aiming for musical diversity and artistic growth. Kuraki worked with Rodney Jerkins on her ninth studio album Future Kiss (2010), influenced by the American R&B sounds. For her tenth album Over the Rainbow (2012), Kuraki collaborated with a Japanese hip hop musician, Nerdhead, on the several songs. Kuraki listed some American musicians on her eleventh studio album Smile (2017), including Nash Overstreet and Porcelain Black. After the gagaku-influenced song "Togetsukyo (Kimi Omou)" (2017) commercially succeeded, Kuraki veered into incorporating the traditional Japanese sounds on her songs. Her twelfth studio album Kimi Omou: Shunkashūtō (2018) mixed elements of J-pop, R&B, gagaku, kayokyoku, and rock. For her thirteenth studio album Let's Goal!: Barairo no Jinsei (2019), Kuraki enlisted the Western musicians such as Fernando Garibay, Benjamin Ingrosso, and Quiz & Larossi. The works of Kuraki have been remixed by prominent DJs, including Johnny Vicious, Justin Strauss, Mark Kamins, and Ken Ishii.

== Image ==
Upon her debut in December 1999, Kuraki scarcely made the appearances on the television shows or the concerts, with people calling her "the Veiled Diva". The similar strategy have taken for the other artists from her label, Being Group, including Zard, Maki Ohguro, and Miho Komatsu. Her first performing took place at the first show on the Sokenbicha Natural Breeze 2001 Happy Live in August 2000. Kuraki her made her first appearance on the live broadcasting television show when she performed "Stay by My Side" on the Kōhaku Uta Gassen in December 2003. She began to appear on multiple television show after performing "Touch Me!" on the television show, Music Station in February 2009.

== Legacy ==
As of 2020, Kuraki has sold over 20 million albums and singles worldwide, and is the 38th best-selling Japanese music artist of all time. Kuraki's works have earned her several awards and accolades, including seven Japan Gold Disc Awards. Kuraki is the only female artist in Japan who has sent all her forty-two singles within the top ten on the Oricon weekly singles chart, since her debut single "Love, Day After Tomorrow" (1999).

Her debut album, Delicious Way sold over 2,210,000 copies in its first week and it has remains as the biggest first week sales for the debut album by a Japanese artist. The album is also the third best-selling debut album and the ninth best-selling album overall in Japan. Kuraki's music is known throughout East Asia, winning The Most Popular Asian Influential Japanese Singer at the Chinese Music Awards in 2012.

On September 27, 2026 Mai Kuraki broke her own Guinness World Record, she sang 30 theme songs for the anime Detective Conan.

== Other ventures ==
=== Products and endorsements ===
In March 2000, Kuraki collaborated with entertainment company Konami and released a puzzle video game for the PlayStation, Techno BB. Kuraki designed the main character in the game, called Mai B Bear. In April 2001, Kuraki teamed up with Coca-Cola Japan to promote their beverage product, Sokenbicha. Those who bought the product could apply for the tickets to attend Kuraki's first promotional tour, Sokenbicha Natural Breeze 2001 Happy Live. In December 2001, Kuraki appeared in the television advertisements for the Shiseido's product, Sea Breeze. Three of her songs, "Feel Fine!", "Kiss", and "If I Believe" have been used for the advertisement series.

In 2009, she signed a deal with cosmetic company Kosé to promote their Esprique Precious collection. From August 2009 to 2011, Kuraki was featured in five television advertisements for the collection. Her songs, "Watashi no, Shiranai, Watashi.", "Eien Yori Nagaku", "Summer Time Gone", "Boyfriend", and "1000 Mankai no Kiss" were all used in the ads. She has also endorsed several brands, U-Can, Clevery Home, Icefield, JR-West, Parco, and Dwango. City of Kyoto has appointed Kuraki as an ambassador of the city and starred her in their television advertisements after the hit of "Togetsukyo (Kimi Omou)". The advertisements featured Kuraki's song, "Hanakotoba".

Many of Kuraki's songs have been used in television advertisements. In 2017, her song "Kimi e no Uta" was used in the television commercial by Japan Overseas Cooperation Volunteers. In 2009, "Top of the World", the Carpenters' cover by Kuraki, was used in the advertisements by Lion Corporation, for their detergent brand Top.

=== Philanthropy ===
Kuraki has been involved with many charities and philanthropies. In April 2006, Kuraki performed at the Cosmo Earth Conscious Act Earth Day Concert at Nippon Budokan in Tokyo. The annual event has been held by Japan FM Network, Tokyo FM, and Cosmo Oil Company to raise awareness for the Earth Day. Ahead of the performance, Kuraki had a talk with a Kenyan social, environmental and political activist Wangari Maathai. Following these events, Kuraki stated that she would begin to start working on global environmental conservation. Kuraki had been a member of the governmental project, Team Minus 6%, which was established to reduce the emission of greenhouse gas. During the Mai Kuraki Live Tour 2006 Diamond, Kuraki invited a Japanese politician Yuriko Koike on the stage to talk about the environmental issues.

Kuraki was among the first and biggest artists to work on the charities and philanthropies after the 2011 Tōhoku earthquake and tsunami. On March 29, 2011, eighteen days after the earthquake occurred, Kuraki performed the national anthem at the charity soccer match "The Tohoku Earthquake recovery support charity match Ganbarou Nippon!", which was played to raise a donation to the victims. All the players, referees, and Kuraki gratuitously participated in the match, and Yanmar Stadium Nagai allowed them to use the stadium free of charge, to send as much donation as possible to the victims. The match was played on March 29, 2011, as well, and Kuraki performed the national anthem again. On April 11, 2011, Kuraki released a charity single, "Anata ga Irukara". The proceeds from the single was donated to the Japanese Red Cross Society. In August 2011, Kuraki visited Onagawa, Miyagi, to do a soup-run and perform a concert. She has visited the city several times since 2011, performing at the music festival Gareki Stock and including the city on her tours. In October 2011, Kuraki held a charity concert, Mai Kuraki Premium Live One for All, All for One at Nippon Budokan. The video of the concert was included on the video album of the same title and was released in March 2012. Another charity single, "Strong Heart" was released in November 2011. In June 2013, Kuraki participated in the Green Wall Project, which aims to plant evergreen broad-leaved trees to work as natural tide embankments in Iwanuma, Miyagi, where the tsunami killed 180 people in March 2011. To promote the project, Kuraki performed at the symposium, in January 2013. Following the 2016 Kumamoto earthquakes in April 2016, Kuraki took part in the volunteering project in Mashiki, Kumamoto by soup-running and performing the live. In October 2017, Kuraki visited the city again to participate in the conference titled "Mirai Talk", where the citizens in the city talked about the strategy for reconstruction. In September 2019, after the Typhoon Faxai hit Chiba Prefecture, Kuraki performed at the public school Nagasaku Gakuen to cheer up the elementary school students in the prefecture. In June 2011, Kuraki performed at the charity concert to encourage blood donation, Love in Action Meeting, as a headliner.

In March 2014, as a part of JICA's Nantokashinakya! Project, Kuraki visited Siem Reap, Cambodia to support the education system in Cambodia. After the visit, Kuraki started her own project with the support by JICA, called Minna de Cambodia ni Terakoya wo Tateyou! Project to found a school in Trei Nhoar, Puok District, Cambodia. Kuraki raised a fund by selling charity merchandises, raising a donation, and auctioning. In February 2016, the project was completed, and Trey Nhoar Community Learning Center, the first school in the village, was founded. The project was featured as a documentary television program titled Mai Kuraki Cambodia no Uta: Sore ga Yume no Hajimari ni naru. Her single, "Stand by You" (2014) was written based on her experience in the country.

== Personal life ==
She is the eldest daughter of the Japanese movie director and actor, Isomi Yamasaki. In 2000, he published a book about Kuraki, containing photos from her childhood, however the book was not published with the approval of Kuraki herself. Isomi Yamasaki died of heart failure in 2020.

Mai owns a dog called "Benito spero" (better known as "Benito"), a mix of Papillon and Toy Poodle, since 2022. She previously owned a Border Collie, named "Casper", which died in 2016 at the age of 14. The announcement of the dog's death has been made through her blog.

== Discography ==
- Delicious Way (2000)
- Perfect Crime (2001)
- Fairy Tale (2002)
- If I Believe (2003)
- Fuse of Love (2005)
- Diamond Wave (2006)
- One Life (2008)
- Touch Me! (2009)
- Future Kiss (2010)
- Over the Rainbow (2012)
- Smile (2017)
- Kimi Omou: Shunkashūtō (2018)
- Let's Goal!: Barairo no Jinsei (2019)
- Unconditional Love (2021)
- Forever for You (2024)

== Books ==
- Myself Music, (Tokyo: Tokuma Shoten, 2002)
- Mai Kuraki: Treasure Book, (Tokyo: CSI, 2020)

== Tours ==
- Sokenbicha Natural Breeze 2001 Happy Live (2001)
- Mai Kuraki Loving You... Tour 2002 (2002)
- You & Mai First Meeting 2002 (2002)
- Giza Studio Hotrod Beach Party (2002) (As Mai-K and Friends)
- Mai Kuraki Fairy Tale Tour 02-03 (2002–2003)
- Giza Studio Valentine Concert (2003) (co-headlined with Rina Aiuchi and Garnet Crow)
- Mai Kuraki 2004 Live Tour Wish You The Best: Grow, Step by Step (2004)
- Mai-K a Tumarrow 2005 (2005)
- Mai Kuraki Live Tour 2005 Like a Fuse of Love (2005)
- Mai Kuraki Live Tour 2006 Diamond Wave (2006)
- Mai-K.net "De Ma Chi" Live de Show (2006)
- Mai Kuraki Live Tour 2007 Be With U (2007)
- Mai-K.net Exclusive Live: You & Mai Summer 2008 (2008)
- Mai Kuraki Live Tour 2008 "Touch Me!" (2008)
- 10th Anniversary Mai Kuraki Live Tour 2009 "Best" (2009)
- Mai Kuraki Live Tour "Future Kiss" (2010–2011)
- Mai Kuraki Live Tour 2012: Over the Rainbow (2012)
- Mai Kuraki Live Project 2013 "Re:" (2013)
- 15th Anniversary Mai Kuraki Live Project 2014 "151A": Fun Fun Fun (2014)
- 15th Anniversary Mai Kuraki Live Project 2014 "151A": Muteki na Heart (2014)
- Mai Kuraki Live Project 2017 "Sawage Live" (2017)
- Mai Kuraki Live Project 2018 "Red It Be": Kimi Omou Shunkashūtō (2018)
- 20th Anniversary Mai Kuraki Live Project 2019 in Asia (2019)
- 20th Anniversary Mai Kuraki Live Project 2019 "Let's Goal!: Barairo no Jinsei" (2019)
- 25th Anniversary Mai Kuraki Live Project 2024 "Be alright!" (2024)
- 25th Anniversary Mai Kuraki Live Project 2024 "Be alright!" in Asia (2024-2025)
- Mai Kuraki Live Project 2025 "Relax" -What a Wonderful World- (2025)

== Accolades ==
Year	Award	Category	Work	Result	Ref.
2001	15th Japan Gold Disc Award	Rock Album of the Year	Delicious Way	Won	
2001	15th Japan Gold Disc Award	Song of the Year	"Secret of My Heart"	Won	
2002	16th Japan Gold Disc Award	Rock Album of the Year	Perfect Crime	Won	
2003	17th Japan Gold Disc Award	Rock Album of the Year	Fairy Tale	Won	
2004	18th Japan Gold Disc Award	Rock & Pop Album of the Year	If I Believe	Won	
2005	19th Japan Gold Disc Award	Rock & Pop Album of the Year	Wish You the Best	Won	
2010	21st RTHK International Pop Poll Award	Top Japanese Gold Song	"Beautiful"	Won	
2010	Kodansha Advertising Awards	Best Character Award	KOSE, "Esprique Precious"	Won	
2012	China Music Awards	The Most Popular Asian Influential Japanese Singer	herself	Won	
2016	Fresh Asia Chart Award	Best International Artist	herself	Won	
2017	Guinness World Records	Most Theme Songs Performed by a Single Artist for an Anime Series	collaboration with Detective Conan	Won	
2018	32nd Japan Gold Disc Award	Best 5 Songs By Download	Togetsukyo (Kimi Omou)	Won	
2021	Line Blog	Monthly MVP (July 2021)	"👄🎶"	Won	

== See also ==
- List of best-selling music artists in Japan
