= Future Kiss =

2010 album by Mai Kuraki

Studio album by Mai Kuraki
- Released: November 17, 2010
- Recorded: 2009–2010
- Studios: Birdman West; Cybersound; Red Way Studio
- Genres: Pop; contemporary R&B; funk; soul
- Length: 56:45
- Label: Northern Music
- Producers: Mai Kuraki; Daiko Nagato

Mai Kuraki chronology
All My Best (2009)	Future Kiss (2010)	Over the Rainbow (2012)

Singles from Future Kiss
- 1. "Revive" Released: 1 April 2009; 2. "Beautiful" Released: 10 June 2009; 3. "Drive Me Crazy" Released: 3 March 2010; 4. "Summer Time Gone" Released: 31 August 2010

Future Kiss is the ninth studio album by Japanese singer and songwriter Mai Kuraki. It was released on 17 November 2010, by Northern Music. The album was originally scheduled to be released on 20 October 2010; however, it was pushed back to 17 November 2010.

The album has spawned four singles, including the Japan top 3 hit singles "Revive" and "Beautiful", with the former becoming Kuraki's first song to enter within top three on the Oricon Weekly Singles Chart in the last four year, since "Ashita e Kakeru Hashi" (2004). Kuraki embarked on the concert tour entitled Mai Kuraki Live Tour "Future Kiss" in support of the album.

== Promotion ==
=== Singles ===
"Revive" was released on 1 April 2009, as a double-A side with "Puzzle", which was included on Kuraki's second compilation album All My Best. The song served as the opening theme song to the Japanese anime television series Case Closed. A Latin-influenced J-pop song produced by Kuraki's long-time collaborator, Aika Ohno and Miguel Sá Pessoa, "Revive" was a commercial success. The double-A side single peaked at number three on the Oricon Weekly Singles Chart, becoming her first song to enter within top three on the chart in the last four years, since "Ashita e Kakeru Hashi" (2004). The single has sold more than 48,000 copies in Japan alone.

"Beautiful" was released on 10 June 2009, as the second single from Kuraki's second compilation album All My Best. The song was re-arranged as "Comfortable Version" and included on Future Kiss. The song peaked at number two on the Oricon Weekly Singles Chart and number five on the Billboard Japan Hot 100. The song served as the commercial song to the Japanese cosmetic brand, Salon Style by Kosé Cosmeport. The song has sold over 36,000 copies as of August 2018.

"Drive Me Crazy" was released on 3 March 2010, as a double-A side with "Eien Yori Nagaku". The song served as the Japanese theme song to the American science fiction television series Heroes: Season 3. The R&B-influenced J-pop song managed to sold approximately 30,000 copies and peaked at number four on the Oricon Weekly Singles Chart.

"Summer Time Gone" was released on 31 August 2010 as the fourth single from the album. The song served as the ending theme song to the Japanese anime television series Case Closed and television commercial song to the cosmetic brand, Esprique Precious by Kosé, in which Kuraki appeared. The song peaked at number four on the Oricon Singles Chart and number eight on the Billboard Japan Hot 100, selling over 33,000 copies.

==== Promotional singles ====
"Watashi no, Shiranai, Watashi." was originally written for Kuraki's second compilation album, All My Best; however, the song was re-arranged as "Precious Version" and included on Future Kiss. Original version of the song peaked at number twenty on the Billboard Japan Hot 100, and served as the television commercial song to the cosmetic brand, Esprique Precious by Kosé.

"Boyfriend" was performed at Kuraki's concert 10th Anniversary Mai Kuraki Live Tour 2009 "Best" Happy Halloween Live in October 2009. The Rodney Jerkins-produced R&B song featuring an American singer and songwriter Michael Africk served as the television commercial song to the cosmetic brand, Esprique Precious by Kosé.

"Tomorrow is the Last Time" served as the theme song to the Japanese anime television series Case Closed. The J-pop ballad song peaked at number forty-two on the RIAJ Digital Track Chart. "Tomorrow is the Last Time" was later included on Kuraki's compilation albums; Mai Kuraki Best 151A: Love & Hope and Mai Kuraki x Meitantei Conan Collaboration Best 21: Shinjitsu wa Itsumo Uta ni Aru!.

"Future Kiss" was written by Kuraki herself and her long-time collaborators, Yue Mochizuki, Takahiro Hiraga, and Masazumi Ozawa. Kuraki performed the song on several television shows and the performances helped the song enter the Billboard Japan Hot 100 at number thirty.

== Release ==
Future Kiss was originally set to be released on October 20, 2010, but the release date was delayed to November 17 due to longer than expected production time.

The regular version (Northern Music VNCM-9012) includes a bonus CD single "Boyfriend" which is done by Kuraki and Michael Africk. Some of the album covers feature a profile of Kuraki with her eyes closed. The limited edition (Northern Music VNCM-9011), indicated mainly by a profile of Kuraki's face with a hand covering her eyes, include the "Boyfriend" CD and a DVD with the Mai Kuraki Time Capsule movie.

== Commercial performance ==
Future Kiss was released on November 17, 2010, and debuted on Oricon Weekly album chart at No. 3, selling 40,093 copies. Despite its good chart performance, it sold 65,179 copies in total and became her fewest sales of her original album in Japan.

== Track listing ==
All lyrics are written by Mai Kuraki.

Standard edition
No.	Title	Music	Arranger(s)	Length
1.	"Future Kiss"	Yue Mochizuki; Takahiro Hiraga	Masazumi Ozawa	3:51
2.	"Wana"	Silver Stream	Silver Stream	3:25
3.	"Revive"	Aika Ohno	Miguel Sá Pessoa	4:40
4.	"Watashi no, Shiranai, Watashi. (わたしの、しらない、わたし。, The Me I Don't Know)" (Precious version)	Mochizuki	Daisuke Ikeda	4:21
5.	"Summer Time Gone"	Ohno	Takeshi Hayama	4:17
6.	"I Scream!"	Akihito Tokunaga	Tokunaga	3:30
7.	"Drive Me Crazy"	Silver Stream	Silver Stream	4:01
8.	"I Can Do It Now"	Hidekazu Uchiike	Ikeda	3:12
9.	"Beautiful" (Comfortable Version)	Song Yang Ha	Song Yang Ha	3:57
10.	"I Promise"	Ohno	Hitoshi Okamoto	4:46
11.	"Sound of Rain"	Tokunaga	Tokunaga	4:06
12.	"Tomorrow Is the Last Time"	Ohno	Hayama	4:00
13.	"Anywhere"	Jon Carin; Perry Geyer	Carin; Geyer	4:59

First press bonus CD
No.	Title	Music	Length
1.	"Boyfriend" (featuring Michael Africk)	R. Jerkins; L. Daniels; D. Thomas; Ane. Birchett; Ant. Brichett	3:48

Limited edition bonus DVD
No.	Title	Length
1.	"Mai Kuraki Time Capsule Movie"

== Personnel ==
Production

- Produced by: Mai Kuraki and Daiko Nagato
- Recorded and Mixed at Birdman West, Cybersound NYC and Boston, Red Way Studio
- Engineers: Takayuki Ichikawa, Miguel Sa Pessoa, Perry Geyer
- Mixed by Takayuki Ichikawa (Northern Music)
- Mastered at Birdman Mastering
- Chief Director: Tokiko Nishimuro (Northern Music)
- Director: Shun Sato (Northern Music)

== Charts ==
=== Daily charts ===
Chart (2010)	Peak position
Oricon Albums Chart	2

=== Weekly charts ===
Chart (2010)	Peak position
Oricon Albums Chart	3
Billboard Japan Albums Chart	3

=== Monthly charts ===
Chart (2010)	Peak position
Oricon Albums Chart	12

=== Yearly charts ===
Chart (2010)	Peak position
Oricon Albums Chart	128

== Sales ==
Region	Certification	Certified units/sales
Japan	—	49,195

== Release history ==
Region	Date	Version	Format	Label	Ref.
Japan	November 17, 2010	Standard	Digital download	Northern Music	
Japan	November 17, 2010	Standard	CD	Northern Music	
Japan	November 17, 2010	Limited	CD+DVD	Northern Music	
Japan	November 17, 2010	FC & Musing edition	CD	Northern Music	
Taiwan	November 19, 2010	Standard	CD	Shin Kong - Being	
Taiwan	November 19, 2010	Limited	CD+DVD	Shin Kong - Being	
South Korea	December 7, 2010	Limited	CD+DVD	C&L Music/CJ E&M M&L	
