= Mai Kuraki Best 151A: Love & Hope =

Greatest hits album by Mai Kuraki
- Released: November 12, 2014
- Genre: Pop, R&B
- Length: Disc 1: 68:26; Disc 2: 63:27
- Label: Northern Music
- Producer: Mai Kuraki (Executive producer), Daiko Nagato,

Mai Kuraki chronology
Mai Kuraki Symphonic Collection in Moscow (2012)	Mai Kuraki Best 151A: Love & Hope (2014)	Smile (2017)

Singles from Mai Kuraki Best 151A: Love & Hope
- 1. "Anata ga Irukara" Released: April 11, 2011; 2. "Koi ni Koishite" Released: August 15, 2012; 3. "Special Morning Day to You" Released: August 15, 2012; 4. "Try Again" Released: February 6, 2013; 5. "Wake Me Up" Released: February 26, 2014; 6. "Muteki na Heart" Released: August 27, 2014; 7. "Stand by You" Released: August 27, 2014

Mai Kuraki Best 151A: Love & Hope is the third greatest hits album released by the Japanese singer Mai Kuraki. It was released on 12 November 2014 on the Northern Music label.

== Background ==
The title of album (151A) means "15th anniversary one word thank you".

The album includes six previously released singles, from Koi no Koishite to Stand by you. It is divided into two parts: Love, which contains mix of Kuraki's ballad songs, and Hope, which contains a mix of Kuraki's dance songs.

The cover jacket of the album is the same as that of her first album Delicious Way, with the same pose, hair style and looking into the camera.

== Charting performance ==
The album reached #2 in its first week. It charted for 15 weeks and sold 67,000 copies.

== Track listing ==
=== Disc one: LOVE ===
All lyrics are written by Mai Kuraki

No.	Title	Music	Arranger(s)	Length
1.	"Stay by my side" (2nd single)	Aika Ohno	Cybersound	4:26
2.	"Secret of My Heart" (3rd single)	Ohno	Cybersound	4:24
3.	"Tsumetai Umi" (冷たい海, 7th single)	Ohno	Cybersound	4:39
4.	"Time After Time (Hana Mau Machi de)" (Time after time ～花舞う街で～, 15th single)	Ohno	Daisuke Ikeda, Cybersound	4:11
5.	"Ashita e Kakeru Hashi" (明日へ架ける橋, 18 single)	Akihito Tokunaga	Daisuke Ikeda, Akihito Tokunaga	3:58
6.	"Aitakute..." (会いたくて..., from 6th album "Diamond Wave")	Tokunaga	Tokunaga	4:30
7.	"Shiroi Yuki" (白い雪 25th single)	Ohno	Daisuke Ikeda	4:47
8.	"Tomorrow is the last Time'" (from 9th album "Future Kiss")	Ohno	Takeshi Hayama	3:58
9.	"Mō Ichido" (もう一度, 36th single)	Jinichi Tajiri	Tajiri	3:54
10.	"Anata ga Iru Kara" (あなたがいるから, digital single)	Yue Mochizuki	Onozuka	3:04
11.	"Your Best Friend" (37th single)	Giorgia Cancemi	Cancemi	5:50
12.	"Koi ni Koishite" (恋に恋して, 38th single)	Cancemi	Cybersound	4:09
13.	"Hakanasa" (儚さ, from album Mai Kuraki Symphonic Collection in Moscow)	Ikurō Fujiwara	Fujiwara	6:33
14.	"Sakura Sakura..." (さくら さくら…, 39th single's c/w)	Ohno	Ryou Hayashi	4:43
15.	"Stand by You" (40th single's c/w)	Tokunaga	Tokunaga	5:21

=== Disc two: HOPE ===
All lyrics are written by Mai Kuraki

No.	Title	Music	Arranger(s)	Length
1.	"Love, Day After Tomorrow" (debut)	Ohno	Cybersound	4:03
2.	"Delicious Way" (from 1st album "Delicious Way")	Ohno	Cybersound	3:52
3.	"Reach for the Sky" (6th single)	Ohno	Cybersound	4:49
4.	"Stand Up" (8th single)	Akihito Tokunaga	Tokunaga	4:39
5.	"always" (9th single)	Ohno	Cybersound	4:07
6.	"Feel Fine!" (12th single)	Tokunaga	Tokunaga	4:48
7.	"Revive" (31st single)	Ohno	Miguel Sá Pessoa	4:39
8.	"Watashi no, Shiranai, Watashi." (わたしの、しらない、わたし。, from best album All my best)	Mochizuki	Daisuke Ikeda, Shun Satou	4:03
9.	"Strong Heart" (1st DVD single)	Cancemi	Cancemi	4:20
10.	"Special morning day to you" (38th single's c/w)	Tokunaga	Tokunaga	4:34
11.	"Try Again" (39th single)	Tokunaga	Cybersound	4:25
12.	"Wake me up" (2nd DVD single)	Tokunaga	Tokunaga	4:21
13.	"You Can" (new song)	Ohno	Cybersoun	4:02
14.	"Muteki na Heart" (無敵なハート, 40th single)	Takahiro Hiraga, Yue Mochizuki	Shun Satou, Jinichi Tajiri	3:24
15.	"Dynamite" (new song)	Tesung Kim, Coach&Sendo, Katerina Bramley	Coach&Sendo	3:21

== Usage in media ==
- "Secret of my heart" was used as an ending theme for anime Detective Conan
- "Time After Time" was used as the theme song for the movie Detective Conan: Crossroad in the Ancient Capital
- "Shiroi Yuki" was used as an ending theme for anime Detective Conan
- "Tomorrow is the last time" was used as an ending theme for anime Detective Conan
- "Koi ni Koishite" was used as an ending theme for anime Detective Conan
- "Your Best Friend" was used as an ending theme for anime Detective Conan
- "always" was used as an ending theme for anime Detective Conan and as the theme song for the movie Detective Conan: Countdown to Heaven
- "Revive" was used as an opening theme for anime Detective Conan
- "Try Again" was used as an opening theme for anime Detective Conan
- "Muteki na Heart" was used as an ending theme for anime Detective Conan
- "Dynamite" was used as opening theme for anime Detective Conan and as the theme song for TV special The Disappearance of Edogawa Conan
- "Ashita he Kakeru Hashi" was used as an ending theme for NHK night dramas Motto Koiseyo Otome and Hikeshiya Komachi
- "Aitakute" was used as the theme song for the movie Ohsaka Hamlet
- "Mou Ichido" was used as the theme song for the drama Kiri ni Sumu Akuma
- "Stand Up" was used as a commercial song for Coca-Cola
- "Feel fine!" was used as a commercial song for Sea Breeze
- "Watashi no Shiranai Watashi" was used as a commercial song for Kosé's Esprique Precious
- "Strong Heart" was used as a theme song for the drama Hunter -Sono Onna Tachi, Shoukinkasegi-
- "Wake me up" was used as a theme song for the live-action movie Kiki's Delivery Service
