= Yūji Mikimoto =

Japanese actor and voice actor

- 幹本 雄之
- Born: Masaru Miyashita; March 15, 1948 (age 78); Niigata Prefecture, Japan
- Occupations: Actor; voice actor
- Years active: 1970–present
- Agent: Arts Vision

Masaru Miyashita (宮下 勝, Miyashita Masaru; born March 15, 1948), better known by his stage name Yūji Mikimoto (幹本 雄之, Mikimoto Yūji), is a Japanese actor and voice actor from Niigata Prefecture, Japan.

== Filmography ==
=== Television animation ===
1970s

- The Adventures of Hutch the Honeybee (1974) – minor role
- Hoshi no Ko Chobin (1974) – minor role
- Hurricane Polymar (1974) – minor role
- Time Bokan (1976) – Kaku-san
- Ippatsu Kanta-kun (1977) – Morita
- Cyborg 009 (1979) – Yacob
- Gatchaman Fighter (1979) – Ganda

1980s

- Gyakuten! Ippatsuman (1982) – Gulliver
- Space Cobra (1982) – Leo
- Cat's Eye (1983) – A police officer
- Fist of the North Star (1984) – Fuuga, Junk, Gunter and others
- Blue Comet SPT Layzner (1985) – Dal
- Musashi no Ken (1985) – Kiyokazu Musha
- Saint Seiya (1986) – Bear Geki, Centaurus Babel
- City Hunter (1987) – Ogino (ep. 3)
- Machine Robo: Battle Hackers (1987) – Yarsand
- Transformers: The Headmasters (1987) – Apeface, Blanker (Pointblank)
- Meimon! The Third Baseball Club (1988) – Sakamoto
- Oishinbo (1988) – Noriaki Hirano
- Sakigake!! Otokojuku (1988) – Rinkai
- Transformers: Super-God Masterforce (1988) – Diver
- Transformers: Victory (1989) – Blackshadow

1990s

- Kinnikuman: Kinnikusei Oui Soudatsu-hen (1992) – Ramenman
- Slam Dunk (1993) – Chūichirō Noma, Kengo Murasame, Shouichi Takano
- Mobile Suit Gundam Wing (1995) – Tubarov
- Rurouni Kenshin (1996) – Hyouei Nishida (Tsuruyo Mutoh's Brother)
- Trigun (1998) – Lurald
- Cowboy Bebop (1999) – Pilot (Ep. 16)

2000s

- Hellsing (2001) – Second Lieutenant Parker (Ep. 9)
- Ghost in the Shell: Stand Alone Complex (2002) – Police Chief (ep 17)
- Kino's Journey (2003) – Poet (ep 3)
- Stratos 4 (2003) – Examiner (ep 12)
- Tetsujin 28-go (2004) – Kenji Murasame
- Emma - A Victorian Romance (2005) – Stevens
- Emma - A Victorian Romance: Second Act (2007) – Stevens
- Code Geass: Lelouch of the Rebellion R2 (2008) – Carares (ep 1, 2)

=== OVA ===
- Blue Comet SPT Layzner (1986) – Attila
- Elf 17 (1987) – Elder
- Mobile Suit Gundam 0083: Stardust Memory (1991) – Chap Adel
- Giant Robo (1992) – Kenji Murasame, Narrator
- Gundam Wing: Endless Waltz (1997) – Tubarov

=== Theatrical animation ===
- Lupin III: The Mystery of Mamo (1978) – A police officer
- Mobile Suit Gundam 0083: The Last Blitz of Zeon (1992) – Chap Adel
- Slam Dunk series (1994–95) – Chūichirō Noma
- Martian Successor Nadesico: The Motion Picture – Prince of Darkness (1998) – Shinjō Aritomo
- Mobile Suit Gundam Special Edition (2000) – Uragan
- Tetsujin 28-go: Morning Moon of Midday (2007) – Kenji Murasame
- Detective Conan: The Raven Chaser (2009) – Irish

=== Tokusatsu ===
- Kyuukyuu Sentai GoGo-V (1999) – Pollen Psyma Beast Baira (ep. 34)

=== Dubbing ===
==== Live-action ====
- The Adventures of Buckaroo Banzai Across the 8th Dimension – President Widmark (Ronald Lacey), Casper Lindley (Bill Henderson)
- Air America – Jack Neely (Art LaFleur)
- Back to the Future (1989 TV Asahi edition) – Dave McFly (Marc McClure)
- Criminal Minds – Ray Finnegan (William Sadler)
- Dr. Quinn, Medicine Woman – Horace Bing (Frank Collison)
- Executive Decision – El Sayed Jaffa (Andreas Katsulas)
- Farewell My Concubine – Eunuch Zhang (Di Tong)
- Guilty by Suspicion – Ray Karlin (Tom Sizemore)
- The Hidden – Jack DeVries (Chris Mulkey)
- In the Name of the Father – Chief PO Barker (John Benfield)
- Judge Dredd (1997 Fuji TV edition) – Geiger (Ian Dury)
- The Keeper – Conner Wells (Steph DuVall)
- The Last Boy Scout – Alley Thug (Badja Djola), Baynard's Bodyguard (Robert Apisa)
- Mercury Rising – Martin Lynch (John Carroll Lynch)
- The Mission – Father John Fielding (Liam Neeson)
- Platoon (1989 TV Asahi edition) – Tex (David Neidorf)
- The Reincarnation of Peter Proud – Jeff Curtis (Tony Stephano)
- The Sea Inside – José Sampedro (Celso Bugallo)
- Showgirls – Al Torres (Robert Davi)
- Turbulence – Captain Samuel Bowen (Ben Cross)
- Twin Peaks – Andy Brennan (Harry Goaz)
- Twin Peaks (2017) – Andy Brennan (Harry Goaz)
- West Side Story (1990 TBS edition) – Police Lieutenant Schrank (Simon Oakland)

==== Animation ====
- Batman: The Animated Series – Goliath
- G.I. Joe: A Real American Hero – Torpedo
- Looney Tunes – Narrator
- The New Adventures of Winnie the Pooh – Storekeeper
