= Smile (Mai Kuraki album) =

- Standard edition/digital download cover

Studio album by Mai Kuraki
- Released: February 15, 2017
- Recorded: 2015–17
- Studio: Northern Music
- Genres: J-pop; R&B; rock; dance
- Length: 46:46
- Label: Northern Music
- Producers: Mai Kuraki; Daiko Nagato

Mai Kuraki chronology
Mai Kuraki Best 151A: Love & Hope (2014)	Smile (2017)	Mai Kuraki x Meitantei Conan Collaboration Best 21: Shinjitsu wa Itsumo Uta ni Aru! (2017)

Singles from Smile
- 1. "Serendipity" Released: May 20, 2015; 2. "Sawage Life" Released: July 30, 2016; 3. "Yesterday Love" Released: January 11, 2017

Smile is the eleventh studio album by Japanese singer and songwriter Mai Kuraki. The album was released on February 15, 2017, by Northern Music. It is the follow-up to her 2014 compilation album, Mai Kuraki Best 151A: Love & Hope. The album was released on three editions: standard edition, fan club edition, and limited edition, which is accompanied with a bonus disc. Smile

The album was preceded by three singles, "Serendipity", "Sawage Life", and "Yesterday Love", which was released as the video single and peaked at number six in Japan. To promote the album, Kuraki embarked on the national tour, "Mai Kuraki Live Project 2017 "Sawage Life"" from March 18, 2017.

== Promotion ==
=== Singles ===
"Serendipity" was released as the lead single from the album on May 20, 2015. It has peaked at number 6 on the RecoChoku Weekly Singles Chart, but failed to enter the Japan Hot 100. The song was used by West Japan Railway Company for the promotion of San'yō Shinkansen.

"Sawage Life" was released as the second single from the album on July 30, 2016. The song was written by the American singer-songwriter Porcelain Black and Bobby Huff and featured as the ending theme song for the Japanese animation program Case Closed.

"Yesterday Love" was released as the third single from the album on January 11, 2017. The song was released on Blu-ray and DVD format and has peaked at number 3 on the Oricon Music Blu-ray Chart. The song was also featured as the ending theme song for Case Closed.

== Commercial performance ==
Smile sold 11,910 copies in its release date and debuted at number 4 on the Oricon daily chart behind Big Bang's Made, Scandal's Best Album "Scandal" and Leo Ieiri's 5th Anniversary Best. It peaked at number 2 on the chart on February 16, 2017 with selling 4,220 copies in a day. The album debuted at number 4 on the Oricon weekly chart with selling 21,222 copies in its first week.

As of March, 2018, the album has sold 29,716 physical copies in Japan.

== Track listing ==
Standard edition
No.	Title	Writer(s)	Length
1.	"Yesterday Love"	Mai Kuraki; Keiya Kubota; Daikō Nagato; Yumeto Tsurusawa	4:55
2.	"Mystery Hero (ミステリー ヒーロー, Mystery Hero)"	Kuraki; Akihito Tokunaga	4:07
3.	"Garasu no Bishō (硝子の微笑, Smile of Glass)"	Kuraki; SHIBU; Yosuke Yamashita	4:01
4.	"Open Love"	Kuraki; Command Freaks; Tesung Kim; Sophia Pae; Jake K	3:23
5.	"Sawage Life"	Kuraki; Alaina Beaton; Bobby Huff; Taito	3:20
6.	"I Like It"	Kuraki; Nanna Larsen; Takashi Fukuda; Makoto Wakatabe	3:36
7.	"My Victory"	Kuraki; Seiji Motoyama; Manabu Marutani; Larsen	3:33
8.	"Serendipity"	Kuraki; Tokunaga	4:18
9.	"Make That Change"	Kuraki; Tokunaga	4:26
10.	"Tell Me Why"	Kuraki; Yongshin Kim; Maxx Song; Casper; 220	3:23
11.	"My Way"	Kuraki; Jake K; Tesung Kim; Sophia Pae; Shoko Mochiyama	4:12
12.	"Kimi e no Uta (きみへのうた, Song for You)"	Kuraki; Sidnie Tipton; Shane Pittman; Nash Overstreet	3:40
Total length:			47 min

Limited edition bonus disc
No.	Title	Writer(s)	Length
1.	"I Like It (Remix)"	Kuraki; Larsen; Fukuda; Wakatabe; Motoyama	3:36

== Personnel ==
Credits adapted from the CD booklet of Smile.

- Mai Kuraki – vocals, producer, songwriting,
- Akihito Tokunaga - composing, tracking
- Toshiya Kubota - composing, backing vocals
- Daikō Nagato - producer, composing, tracking
- Shibu - composing, tracking
- Command Freaks- composing, tracking
- Tesung Kim - composing, tracking
- Sophia Pae - composing, tracking
- Jake K - composing, tracking
- Takashi Fukuda - composing, tracking
- Maxx song - composing, tracking
- Yongshin Kim - composing, tracking
- Alaina Beaton - composing
- Bobby Huff - composing
- Makoto Watanabe - composing
- Manabu Marutani - composing
- Nanna Larsen - composing
- Sidnie Tipton - composing
- Shane Pittman - composing
- Michael Africk - backing vocals
- Taito - tracking
- Shoko Mochiyama - tracking
- Nash Overstreet - tracking
- Naoki Morioka - guitar
- Yumemoto Tsuresawa - guitar, tracking
- Takayuki Ichikawa - recording, mixing
- Seiji Motoyama - mixing, composing, tracking
- Ethan Brand - mixing
- Miguel Sa Pessoa - mixing
- Asumi Narita - coordinator
- Masahiro Shimada- mastering
- Miho Saito - A&R
- Asako Watanabe - artist management
- Chiharu Kurosawa - artist management
- Tetsuo Sato - art direction, art design

== Charts ==
=== Daily charts ===
Chart (2017)	Peak position
Japanese Albums Chart	2

=== Weekly charts ===
Chart (2017)	Peak position
Oricon Albums Chart	4
Billboard Japan Albums Chart	7

=== Monthly charts ===
Chart (2017)	Peak position
Japanese Albums Chart	17

== Certification and sales ==
Region	Certification	Certified units/sales
Japan	—	29,716

== Release history ==
List of release dates, showing region, format(s), edition(s), label, and references
Region	Date	Format(s)	Edition(s)	Label(s)	Ref.
Japan	February 15, 2017	CD	Standard; Limited; FC & Musing	Northern Music	
Japan	February 22, 2017	digital download	Standard	Northern Music	
