= Serendipity (Mai Kuraki song) =

- "Serendipity (feat. Sensation)" cover

Promotional single by Mai Kuraki

from the album Smile
- Released: May 20, 2015; January 7, 2016 (featuring Sensation)
- Recorded: 2014; 2015
- Genre: J-pop; pop
- Length: 4:16; 4:23 (featuring Sensation)
- Label: Northern Music
- Songwriters: Mai Kuraki; Akihito Tokunaga
- Producer: Kanonji

Mai Kuraki promotional singles chronology
"Anata ga Irukara" (2011)	"Serendipity" (2015)	"Sawage Life" (2016)

Music video
- "Serendipity" on YouTube

"Serendipity" is Mai Kuraki's song from her eleventh studio album Smile, released on May 20, 2015. Kuraki re-recorded this song with Sensation, and it was released on January 7, 2016. The original version of the song is the only song Kuraki released in 2015.

== Release ==
On May 20, 2015, the original version of "Serendipity" was released on major music download services, but it didn't reach any major charts.

On January 7, 2016, the song was re-released featuring Sensation and premiered on Recochoku. With release of the music video and usage in the commercial of West Japan Railway Company's "Ashita Serendipity Campaign" to commemorate the 40th anniversary of the extension of Sanyo Shinkansen to Hakata, this song debuted at No. 1 on the Recochoku Singles Daily Chart.

== Music video ==
The video was released on January 5, 2016, on GyaO and January 6 on YouTube. On GyaO, the video was watched more than 23,000 times in 4 days.

== Track listing ==
Digital download
No.	Title	Length
1.	"Serendipity"	4:16

Digital download
No.	Title	Length
1.	"Serendipity" (featuring Sensation)	4:23

== Charts ==
=== Daily charts ===
Chart (2016)	Peak position
Japan (Recochoku)	1

=== Weekly charts ===
Chart (2016)	Peak position
Japan (Recochoku)	6

== Release history ==
Region	Date	Format	Label
Japan	May 20, 2015	Digital download	Northern Music
Japan	January 7, 2016	Digital download (featuring Sensation)	Northern Music
