= Eien Yori Nagaku/Drive me crazy =

Single by Mai Kuraki

from the album Future Kiss
- A-side: Eien Yori Nagaku; Drive me crazy
- Released: March 3, 2010
- Recorded: 2010
- Genre: J-pop
- Label: Northern Music
- Songwriter(s): Mai Kuraki; Zaitsu Kazuo; Silver Stream
- Producer(s): Mai Kuraki; Daiko Nagato

Mai Kuraki singles chronology
"Beautiful" (2009)	"Eien Yori Nagaku/Drive me crazy" (2010)	"Summer Time Gone" (2010)

"Eien Yori Nagaku/Drive me crazy" is Mai Kuraki's thirty-third single, released on March 3, 2010.

== Track listing ==
Standard edition
No.	Title	Writer(s)	Arranger(s)	Length
1.	"Eien Yori Nagaku"	Mai Kuraki; Kazuo Zaizu	Makoto Sasaki; Ken Harakawa	4:03
2.	"Drive Me Crazy"	Kuraki; Silver Stream	Silver Stream	3:47
3.	"Eien Yori Nagaku" (Instrumental)	Kuraki; Zaizu	Sasaki; Harakawa	4:03
4.	"Drive Me Crazy" (Instrumental)	Kuraki; Silver Stream	Silver Stream	3:47
Total length:				15:35

Limited edition bonus DVD
No.	Title	Length
1.	"Eien Yori Nagaku" (Music clip)

== Charts ==
Release date	Chart	Peak position
March 3, 2010	Oricon Daily Singles Chart	1
March 3, 2010	Oricon Weekly Singles Chart	4
March 3, 2010	Oricon Monthly Singles Chart	15
March 3, 2010	Billboard Japan Hot 100	6
March 3, 2010	Billboard Japan Hot 100 Airplay	11
March 3, 2010	Billboard Japan Hot Singles Sales	5
