= Boyfriend (Mai Kuraki song) =

Song by Mai Kuraki featuring Michael Africk

from the album Future Kiss
- Released: November 17, 2010
- Recorded: 2009
- Genre: R&B; J-Pop
- Length: 3:48
- Label: Northern Music
- Songwriter(s): Anesha Birchett; Antea Birchett; Delisha Thomas; Lashawn Daniels; Rodney Jerkins
- Producer(s): Mai Kuraki; Michael Africk; KANNONJI

"Boyfriend" is a song from Japanese singer Mai Kuraki and American singer-songwriter Michael Africk, taken from Kuraki's ninth studio album Future Kiss.

== Live performances ==
Kuraki performed the song at Happy Happy Halloween Live: Mai Kuraki Live Tour 2009 "Best" on October 31, 2009, at Nippon Budokan, along with Michael Africk.

== Usage in media ==
The song was featured in the commercial for Japanese cosmetic brand KOSÉ's Esprique Precious collection.
