= Special Morning Day to You =

- Standard edition back cover

Single by Mai Kuraki

from the album Mai Kuraki Best 151A: Love & Hope
- Released: August 15, 2012
- Genre: J-pop
- Length: 4:38
- Label: Northern Music
- Songwriter(s): Mai Kuraki; Akihito Tokunaga
- Producer(s): Mai Kuraki, KANNONJI

Mai Kuraki singles chronology
"Strong Heart" (2011)	"Koi ni Koishite" / "Special Morning Day to You" (2012)	"Try Again" (2013)

Music video
- "Special Morning Day to You" on YouTube

"Special Morning Day to You" is a song by Japanese singer songwriter Mai Kuraki, taken from her fourth compilation album Mai Kuraki Best 151A: Love & Hope (2014).

== Release ==
The album was released on 15 August 2012 through Giza Studio as a double-A sid single with "Koi ni Koishite". The song was written by Kuraki herself and her long-time collaborator Akihito Tokunaga, and produced by Kuraki herself and Kannonji.

== Use in media ==
"Special Morning Day to You" served as the television commercial song to the Canadian mineral water brand, Icefield.

== Reception ==
The single reached number seven in Japan, selling 21,970 copies in total.

== Music video ==
A short version of the official music video was first released on Kuraki's official YouTube account on August 3, 2012. As of February 2018, it has received over 97,800 views on YouTube.

== Track listing ==
CD
No.	Title	Writer(s)	Arranger(s)	Length
1.	"Koi ni Koishite"	Mai Kuraki; Giorgio Cancemi	Cybersound	4:12
2.	"Special Morning Day to You"	Kuraki; Akihito Tokunaga	Tokunaga	4:38
3.	"Koi ni Koishite" (Instrumental)	Kuraki; Cancemi	Cybersound	4:12
4.	"Special Morning Day to You" (Instrumental)	Tokunaga	Tokunaga	4:38
Total length:				17:39

DVD (Limited edition)
No.	Title	Length
1.	"Koi ni Koishite" (music video)
2.	"Icefield" (TV commercial movies)

Digital download
No.	Title	Writer(s)	Arranger(s)	Length
1.	"Koi ni Koishite"	Mai Kuraki; Giorgio Cancemi	Cybersound	4:12
2.	"Special Morning Day to You"	Kuraki; Akihito Tokunaga	Tokunaga	4:38
Total length:				8:50

== Charts ==
=== Weekly charts ===
Chart (2012)	Peak position
Japan (Oricon)	7
Taiwan J-Pop (GMusic Asian Pop Chart)	7

=== Monthly charts ===
Chart (2012)	Peak position
Japan (Oricon)	37

=== Year-end charts ===
Chart (2012)	Position
Japan (Oricon)	315

== Certification and sales ==
Region	Certification	Certified units/sales
Japan (RIAJ)		21,970 (physical sales)

== Release history ==
Region	Date	Format	Label
Japan	August 27, 2014	CD single (Standard edition)	Northern Music
Japan	August 27, 2014	CD single/DVD (Limited edition)	Northern Music
Japan	August 27, 2014	CD single (Musing & FC edition)	Northern Music
Japan	August 27, 2014	Digital download	Northern Music
