= Wake Me Up (Mai Kuraki song) =

- Standard edition cover

Single by Mai Kuraki

from the album Mai Kuraki Best 151A: Love & Hope
- Released: February 26, 2014
- Genre: J-pop
- Length: 4:21
- Label: Northern Music
- Songwriter(s): Mai Kuraki; Akihito Tokunaga
- Producer(s): Mai Kuraki; KANNONJI

Mai Kuraki singles chronology
| "Try Again" (2013) | "Wake Me Up" (2014) | "Muteki na Heart" / "Stand by You" (2014) |

Music video
- "Wake Me Up" on YouTube

"Wake Me Up" is a song by Japanese singer songwriter Mai Kuraki, taken from her third compilation album Mai Kuraki Best 151A: Love & Hope (2014). It was released on February 26, 2014 digitally and as a Video single by Northern Music. The song was served as the theme song to the 2014 Japanese film Kiki's Delivery Service.

== Commercial performance ==
"Wake Me Up" debuted at number 2 on the Oricon Weekly DVD Chart and number 75 on the Japan Hot 100.

== Music video ==
A short version of the official music video was first released on Kuraki's official YouTube account on 25 February 2014. As of January 2018, it has received over 318,000 views on YouTube.

== Track listing ==
DVD
| No. | Title | Writer(s) | Arranger(s) | Length |
|---|---|---|---|---|
| 1. | "Wake Me Up" (Music Clip) | Mai Kuraki; Akihito Tokunaga | Tokunaga |

Limited edition
| No. | Title | Writer(s) | Arranger(s) | Length |
|---|---|---|---|---|
| 2. | "Wake Me Up" (Live @Mai Kuraki Countdown Live 13-14 〜A RE: gato! Ichigo Ichie!〜) | Kuraki; Tokunaga | Tokunaga |

Bonus disc
| No. | Title | Writer(s) | Arranger(s) | Length |
|---|---|---|---|---|
| 1. | "Wake Me Up" | Mai Kuraki; Akihito Tokunaga | Tokunaga | 4:21 |
| 2. | "Always Giving My Heart" | Kuraki; Tokunaga | Tokunaga | 4:51 |
| 3. | "Wake Me Up" (Instrumental) | Kuraki; Tokunaga | Tokunaga | 4:21 |
| Total length: | | | | 13:38 |

== Charts ==
=== Weekly charts ===
| Chart (2014) | Peak position |
|---|---|
| Japan (Oricon) | 3 |
| Japan Hot 100 | 75 |

== Certification and sales ==
| Region | Certification | Certified units/sales |
|---|---|---|
| Japan (RIAJ) | | 12,384(physical sales) |

== Release history ==
| Region | Date | Format | Label |
|---|---|---|---|
| Japan | February 26, 2014 | digital download | Northern Music |
| Japan | February 26, 2014 | DVD (Standard edition) | Northern Music |
| Japan | February 26, 2014 | DVD (Limited edition) | Northern Music |
| Japan | February 26, 2014 | DVD (Musing & FC edition) | Northern Music |
