= Togetsukyo (Kimi Omou) =

"Togetsukyo (Kimi Omofu)"
- Standard edition cover

Single by Mai Kuraki

from the album Mai Kuraki x Meitantei Conan Collaboration Best 21: Shinjitsu wa Itsumo Uta ni Aru!
- Released: April 12, 2017
- Recorded: 2017
- Genre: J-pop
- Length: 4:07
- Label: Northern Music
- Songwriters: Mai Kuraki, Akihito Tokunaga
- Producers: Mai Kuraki, KANNONJI

Mai Kuraki singles chronology
"Yesterday Love" (2017)	"Togetsukyo (Kimi Omofu)" (2017)	"Kimi to Koi no Mama de Owarenai Itsumo Yume no Mama ja Irarenai" / "Barairo no Jinsei" (2019)

Music video
- "Togetsukyo (Kimi Omofu)" on YouTube

"Togetsukyo (Kimi Omofu)" (渡月橋 ～君 想ふ～, Togetsu-kyō Kimi Omofu; lit. "Togetsu-kyō: Think of You") is a song by Japanese singer songwriter Mai Kuraki, taken from her fourth compilation album Mai Kuraki x Meitantei Conan Collaboration Best 21: Shinjitsu wa Itsumo Uta ni Aru! (2017). It was released on April 12, 2017 on physical format and April 19, 2017 on digital format by Northern Music and served as the theme song to the 2017 Japanese animated film Detective Conan: Crimson Love Letter. "Togetsukyo (Kimi Omofu)" is a Gagaku-inspired ballad. The song was written by Kuraki herself and her long-time collaborator Akihito Tokunaga. The song was later included on Kuraki's twelfth studio album Kimi Omofu: Shunkashūtō.

The song has become Kuraki's most successful single since her 2004 single "Ashita e Kakeru Hashi", peaking at number two in the Billboard Japan Hot 100 and five in the Oricon Singles Chart, selling over 76,000 physical copies and downloaded over 250,000 times.

== Critical reception ==
"Togetsukyo (Kimi Omofu)" received mostly positive reviews from critics. CD Journal noted that the arrangement of the song reflects Kuraki's elegant and the taste of Japan. Also, the website acclaimed her voice as innocent and mellowed.

== Commercial performance ==
"Togetsukyo (Kimi Omofu)" debuted at number 5 on the Oricon Weekly Singles Chart, selling 29,846 physical copies. It became her first single in the last 8 years to sell over 29,000 physical copies in its first week. The song also entered Japan Hot 100 chart at number nine and peaked at number two after released on digital format.

In September, 2017, the song received Platinum certification by Recording Industry Association of Japan (RIAJ), selling over 250,000 single units.

On May 10, 2017, the song debuted at number 8 on the Oricon Monthly Singles Chart, selling over 48,000 physical copies and became Kuraki's best-selling single in 2010's. The song has spent 41 weeks on the chart and it became Kuraki's longest charting song surpassing her biggest hit song "Love, Day After Tomorrow", which charted for 30 weeks.

The song is named "the best-selling physical single by female solo singer in 2017".

== Music video ==
A short version of the official music video was first released on Kuraki's official YouTube account on 13 March 2017, about a month before the song was released. It features Kuraki wearing Jūnihitoe, a kind of traditional Japanese garment. As of August 2022, it has received over 12.54 million views on YouTube. A full version of the video is included in the DVD accompanies limited edition of the single.

== In popular culture ==
"Togetsukyo (Kimi Omofu)" was served as the theme song to the 2017 Japanese animated film Detective Conan: Crimson Love Letter and later used as the ending song to the animation Detective Conan.

On December 31, 2017, Kuraki sang the song on the Japanese national music TV program 68th NHK Kōhaku Uta Gassen.

== Track listing ==
Standard edition
No.	Title	Writer(s)	Arranger(s)	Length
1.	"Togetsukyo (Kimi Omofu)"	Mai Kuraki; Akihito Tokunaga	Tokunaga	4:07
2.	"Togetsukyo (Kimi Omofu)" (Instrumental)	Kuraki; Tokunaga	Tokunaga	4:07
3.	"Time After Time (Hana Mau Machi de)" (Time Travel Paradox Remix)	Kuraki; Aika Ohno	Cybersound	4:54
Total length:				13:08

Limited edition
No.	Title	Writer(s)	Arranger(s)	Length
1.	"Togetsukyo (Kimi Omofu)"	Mai Kuraki; Akihito Tokunaga	Tokunaga	4:07
2.	"Togetsukyo (Kimi Omofu)" (Instrumental)	Kuraki; Tokunaga	Tokunaga	4:07
3.	"Togetsukyo (Kimi Omofu)" (Music video)	Kuraki; Tokunaga	Tokunaga
Total length:				8:14

Detective Conan edition/Musing & FC edition
No.	Title	Writer(s)	Arranger(s)	Length
1.	"Togetsukyo (Kimi Omofu)"	Mai Kuraki; Akihito Tokunaga	Tokunaga	4:07
2.	"Togetsukyo (Kimi Omofu)" (Instrumental)	Kuraki; Tokunaga	Tokunaga	4:07
Total length:				8:14

Kyoto edition
No.	Title	Writer(s)	Arranger(s)	Length
1.	"Togetsukyo (Kimi Omofu)"	Mai Kuraki; Akihito Tokunaga	Tokunaga	4:07
2.	"Togetsukyo (Kimi Omofu)" (Instrumental)	Kuraki; Tokunaga	Tokunaga	4:07
3.	"Togetsukyo (Kimi Omofu)" (Wagakki version)	Kuraki; Tokunaga

Digital download
No.	Title	Writer(s)	Arranger(s)	Length
1.	"Togetsukyo (Kimi Omofu)"	Mai Kuraki; Akihito Tokunaga	Tokunaga	4:07
2.	"Time After Time (Hana Mau Machi de)" (Time Travel Paradox Remix)	Kuraki; Aika Ohno	Cybersound	4:53
Total length:				10:00

== Charts ==
=== Weekly charts ===
Chart (2017)	Peak position
Japan (Oricon)	5
Japan (Japan Hot 100)	2
Japan (Japan Hot Animation)	1
Japan (Japan Top Singles Sales)	5
Japan (Japan Radio Songs)	15

=== Monthly charts ===
Chart (2017)	Peak position
Japan (Oricon)	8

=== Year-end charts ===
Chart (2017)	Position
Japan (Japan Hot 100)	52
Japan (Oricon)	72
Japan (Japan Hot Animation)	9
Japan (Japan Top Singles Sales)	88
Japan (Japan Top Download Songs)	13

Chart (2018)	Position
Japan (Japan Top Download Songs)	74

== Certification and sales ==
Region	Certification	Certified units/sales
Japan (RIAJ)		76,305 (physical sales)
Japan (RIAJ)	Platinum	250,000 (digital sale)

== Release history ==
Region	Date	Format	Label
Japan	April 12, 2017	CD single (Standard edition)	Northern Music
Japan	April 12, 2017	CD single/DVD (Limited edition)	Northern Music
Japan	April 12, 2017	CD single (Detective Conan edition)	Northern Music
Japan	April 12, 2017	CD single (Musing & FC edition)	Northern Music
Japan	April 19, 2017	Digital download	Northern Music
Japan	September 13, 2017	CD single (Kyoto edition)	Northern Music
