= Stand by You (Mai Kuraki song) =

- Limited edition B cover

Single by Mai Kuraki

from the album Mai Kuraki Best 151A: Love & Hope
- Released: August 27, 2014
- Recorded: 2014
- Genre: J-pop
- Length: 5:26
- Label: Northern Music
- Songwriter(s): Mai Kuraki; Akihito Tokunaga
- Producer(s): Mai Kuraki, KANNONJI

Mai Kuraki singles chronology
"Wake Me Up" (2014)	"Muteki na Heart" / "Stand by You" (2014)	"Yesterday Love" (2017)

Music video
- "Stand by You" on YouTube

"Stand by You" is a song by Japanese singer-songwriter Mai Kuraki, taken from her third compilation album Mai Kuraki Best 151A: Love & Hope (2014). It was released on August 27, 2014, and served as the nonfiction TV program Mai Kuraki's The Song of Cambodia: Dreams Start from Here. It was released as a double-A side with "Muteki na Heart".

== Background ==
The song was inspired by her experience of visiting Cambodian children through the "Nantokashinakya! Project." Later, Kuraki constructed a school in Cambodia in order to support native children.

== Music video ==
A short version of the official music video was first released on Kuraki's official YouTube account on October 10, 2014. As of January 2018, it has received over 125,000 views on YouTube.

== Track listing ==
Limited edition B
No.	Title	Writer(s)	Arranger(s)	Length
1.	"Stand by You"	Kuraki; Akihito Tokunaga	Tokunaga	5:24
2.	"Muteki na Heart"	Mai Kuraki; Yue Mochizuki; Takahiro Hiraga	Hirokazu Tajiri; Shun Sato	3:27
3.	"Stand by You" (Instrumental)	Tokunaga	Tokunaga	5:24
4.	"Muteki na Heart" (Instrumental)	Kuraki; Mochizuki; Hiraga	Tajiri; Sato	3:24
Total length:				17:40

DVD (Limited edition B)
No.	Title	Length
1.	"Stand by You" (music video)

Standard edition/Limited edition A/FC & Musing edition
No.	Title	Writer(s)	Arranger(s)	Length
1.	"Muteki na Heart"	Mai Kuraki; Yue Mochizuki; Takahiro Hiraga	Hirokazu Tajiri; Shun Sato	3:25
2.	"Stand by You"	Kuraki; Akihito Tokunaga	Tokunaga	5:26
3.	"Muteki na Heart" (Instrumental)	Kuraki; Mochizuki; Hiraga	Tajiri; Sato	3:25
4.	"Stand by You" (Instrumental)	Tokunaga	Tokunaga	5:22
Total length:				17:39

DVD (Limited edition A)
No.	Title	Length
1.	"Muteki na Heart" (music video)

Digital download
No.	Title	Writer(s)	Arranger(s)	Length
1.	"Muteki na Heart"	Mai Kuraki; Yue Mochizuki; Takahiro Hiraga	Hirokazu Tajiri; Shun Sato	3:25
2.	"Stand by You"	Kuraki; Akihito Tokunaga	Tokunaga	5:26
Total length:				8:51

== Charts ==
=== Weekly charts ===
Chart (2014)	Peak position
Japan (Oricon Singles Chart)	5

=== Monthly charts ===
Chart (2014)	Peak position
Japan (Oricon)	21

=== Year-end charts ===
Chart (2014)	Position
Japan (Oricon)	240

== Certification and sales ==
Region	Certification	Certified units/sales
Japan (RIAJ)		29,517 (physical sales)

== Release history ==
Region	Date	Format	Label
Japan	August 27, 2014	CD single (Standard edition)	Northern Music
Japan	August 27, 2014	CD single/DVD (Limited edition A)	Northern Music
Japan	August 27, 2014	CD single (Limited edition B)	Northern Music
Japan	August 27, 2014	CD single (Musing & FC edition)	Northern Music
Japan	August 27, 2014	Digital download	Northern Music
