= Anata ga Irukara =

Song by Mai Kuraki

from the album Mai Kuraki Best 151A: Love & Hope
- Released: April 11, 2011
- Recorded: 2011
- Genre: J-pop
- Length: 3:04
- Label: Northern Music
- Songwriter(s): Mai Kuraki; Yue Mochizuki; Akira Onozuka

Mai Kuraki promotional singles chronology
"Chance for You" (2010)	"Anata ga Irukara" (2011)	"Serendipity" (2015)

"Anata ga Irukara" (あなたがいるから, lit. "Because You're There") is a song by Japanese singer songwriter Mai Kuraki. It was written by Kuraki, Yue Mochizuki and Akira Onozuka. The song was released on April 11, 2011 to support victims of the 2011 Tōhoku earthquake and tsunami in Japan. The proceedings were donated to the Japanese Red Cross Society to benefit the victims.

The song was later released as "Anata ga Irukara (Fantasy on Ice 2011 version)". It features messages from Kuraki and the Japanese figure skater Shizuka Arakawa. The version was also released as video single. The video features Arakawa's and Kuraki's performance at the annual touring show Fantasy on Ice in Japan.

== Track listing ==
Music download
No.	Title	Writer(s)	Arranger(s)	Length
1.	"Anata ga Irukara"	Mai Kuraki; Yue Mochizuki	Akira Onozuka	3:04
Total length:				3:04

Music download (Fantasy on Ice 2011 version)
No.	Title	Writer(s)	Arranger(s)	Length
1.	"Anata ga Irukara" (Fantasy on Ice 2011 version)	Mai Kuraki; Yue Mochizuki	Akira Onozuka	4:01
Total length:				4:01

Video single(Fantasy on Ice 2011 version)
No.	Title	Writer(s)	Arranger(s)	Length
1.	"Anata ga Irukara" (Fantasy on Ice 2011 version)	Mai Kuraki; Yue Mochizuki	Akira Onozuka	3:41
Total length:				3:41

== Release history ==
Region	Date	Format	Label	Ref.
Japan	April 11, 2011	Digital download	Northern Music	
Japan	August 31, 2011	Video single (Fantasy on Ice 2011 version)	Northern Music	
Japan	September 7, 2011	Digital download (Fantasy on Ice 2011 version)	Northern Music	
