= Koi ni Koishite =

- Standard edition/digital download cover

Single by Mai Kuraki

from the album Mai Kuraki Best 151A: Love & Hope
- Released: August 15, 2012
- Genre: J-pop
- Length: 4:12
- Label: Northern Music
- Songwriter(s): Mai Kuraki; Giorgio Cancemi; Cybersound
- Producer(s): Mai Kuraki, KANNONJI

Mai Kuraki singles chronology
"Strong Heart" (2011)	"Koi ni Koishite" / "Special Morning Day to You" (2012)	"Try Again" (2013)

Music video
- "Koi ni Koishite" on YouTube

"Koi ni Koishite" (恋に恋して, lit. "Love to Love You") is a song by Japanese singer songwriter Mai Kuraki, taken from her fourth compilation album Mai Kuraki Best 151A: Love & Hope (2014). It was released on August 15, 2012, and served as the song to the Japanese animation Case Closed. It was released as a double-A side with "Special Morning Day to You".

== Music video ==
A short version of the official music video was first released on Kuraki's official YouTube account on August 3, 2012. As of February 2018, it has received over 765,000 views on YouTube.

== Track listing ==
CD
No.	Title	Writer(s)	Arranger(s)	Length
1.	"Koi ni Koishite"	Mai Kuraki; Giorgio Cancemi	Cybersound	4:12
2.	"Special Morning Day to You"	Kuraki; Akihito Tokunaga	Tokunaga	4:38
3.	"Koi ni Koishite" (Instrumental)	Kuraki; Cancemi	Cybersound	4:12
4.	"Special Morning Day to You" (Instrumental)	Tokunaga	Tokunaga	4:38
Total length:				17:39

DVD (Limited edition)
No.	Title	Length
1.	"Koi ni Koishite" (music video)
2.	"Icefield" (TV commercial movies)

Digital download
No.	Title	Writer(s)	Arranger(s)	Length
1.	"Koi ni Koishite"	Mai Kuraki; Giorgio Cancemi	Cybersound	4:12
2.	"Special Morning Day to You"	Kuraki; Akihito Tokunaga	Tokunaga	4:38
Total length:				8:50

== Charts ==
=== Weekly charts ===
Chart (2012)	Peak position
Japan (Oricon)	7
Japan (Japan Hot 100)	13
Japan (Japan Hot Animation)	2
Taiwan (GMusic Asian Pop Chart)	7

=== Monthly charts ===
Chart (2012)	Peak position
Japan (Oricon)	37

=== Year-end charts ===
Chart (2012)	Position
Japan (Oricon)	315

== Certification and sales ==
Region	Certification	Certified units/sales
Japan (RIAJ)		21,970 (physical sales)

== Release history ==
Region	Date	Format	Label
Japan	August 27, 2014	CD single (Standard edition)	Northern Music
Japan	August 27, 2014	CD single/DVD (Limited edition)	Northern Music
Japan	August 27, 2014	CD single (Musing & FC edition)	Northern Music
Japan	August 27, 2014	Digital download	Northern Music
