= Sawage Life =

Promotional single by Mai Kuraki

from the album Smile
- Released: July 30, 2016
- Recorded: 2016
- Genre: J-pop
- Length: 3:20
- Label: Northern Music
- Songwriter(s): Mai Kuraki; Alaina Beaton; Bobby Huff; TAITO
- Producer(s): Mai Kuraki; KANNONJI

Mai Kuraki promotional singles chronology
"Serendipity" (2015)	"Sawage Life" (2016)	"We Are Happy Women" (2018)

"Sawage Life" (stylized as "SAWAGE☆LIFE") is a song by Japanese singer songwriter Mai Kuraki, taken from her eleventh studio album Smile (2017). It was released digitally on July 30, 2016, by Northern Music and served as the ending theme to the animation TV program Case Closed. The song was written by Kuraki, Bobby Huff and Alaina Beaton, who is known by her stage name Porcelain Black.

== Track listing ==
No.	Title	Writer(s)	Arranger(s)	Length
1.	"Sawage Life"	Mai Kuraki; Alaina Beaton; Bobby Huff	TAITO	3:20
Total length:				3:20

== Release history ==
Region	Date	Format	Label
Japan	July 30, 2016	Digital download	Northern Music
