= Case Closed: The Crimson Love Letter =

- Southeast Asian release poster
- Kanji: 名探偵コナン から紅(くれない)の恋歌(ラブレター)
- Revised Hepburn: Meitantei Konan: Kara Kurenai no Rabu Retā
- Directed by: Kobun Shizuno
- Screenplay by: Takahiro Okura
- Based on: Case Closed by Gosho Aoyama
- Starring: Minami Takayama; Kappei Yamaguchi; Rikiya Koyama; Wakana Yamazaki; Ryo Horikawa; Yuko Miyamura; Megumi Hayashibara; Satsuki Yukino; Daisuke Ono; Yukiko Iwai; Ikue Ōtani; Wataru Takagi; Masaki Terasoma; Kazuhiro Yamaji; Masako Katsuki
- Music by: Katsuo Ono
- Production company: TMS/V1 Studio
- Distributed by: Toho
- Release date: April 15, 2017
- Running time: 112 minutes
- Country: Japan
- Language: Japanese
- Box office: $65.81 million

Case Closed: The Crimson Love Letter, known as Detective Conan: The Crimson Love Letter (名探偵コナン から紅(くれない)の恋歌(ラブレター), Meitantei Konan: Kara Kurenai no Rabu Rettā) in Japan, is a 2017 Japanese animated film directed by Kobun Shizuno and written by Takahiro Okura. It is the twenty-first installment of the Case Closed film series based on the manga series of the same name by Gosho Aoyama, following the 2016 film Case Closed: The Darkest Nightmare. The film was released in Japan on April 15, 2017.

== Plot ==
A bombing case at Nichiuri TV in autumn. The Satsuki Cup, which crowns the winner of Japan's Ogura Hyakunin Isshu based competitive karuta tournament, is currently being filmed inside the facility. The incident results in a big commotion and, while the building is burning to ashes, the only people left inside are Heiji and Kazuha. They get rescued just in time by Conan, who rushes to the scene. Both the identity and motive of the bomber are unknown.

While confusion takes over due to the explosion, Conan meets a mysterious beautiful girl who claims she is "Heiji's fiancée". Her name is Momiji Ooka and she is the Kyoto High School karuta champion. As fate would have it, Kazuha is going to face Momiji in the Hyakunin Isshu competition, so she begins to train with the help of Heiji's mother, Shizuka, who is a skilled karuta player.

At the same time, in a Japanese house in Arashiyama, Kyoto's outskirts, the reigning Satsuki Cup champion is murdered. Pictures of the crime scene reveal Momji's presence. Additionally, several karuta cards were spread around the victim.

Conan and Heiji, along with the Osaka and Kyoto police departments, begin their investigation on the Satsuki Cup and the related murder case. As the inquiry goes on, they come across a secret connected with the Hyakunin Isshu.

After the case is solved, Momiji tells Heiji that he promised to marry her when they were little. Heiji suddenly remembers that this wasn't the case: when they were little, he said he'll be even stronger (tsuyome), but she misheard it as "yome" (bride).

== Cast ==
| Character | Japanese | English |
|---|---|---|
| Shinichi Kudo | Kappei Yamaguchi | Griffin Burns |
| Conan Edogawa | Minami Takayama | Wendee Lee |
| Ran Mori | Wakana Yamazaki | Cristina Vee |
| Kogoro Mori | Rikiya Koyama | Xander Mobus |
| Heiji Hattori | Ryo Horikawa | Lucien Dodge |
| Kazuha Toyama | Yuko Miyamura | Kayli Mills |
| Ai Haibara | Megumi Hayashibara | Erica Mendez |
| Ayumi Yoshida | Yukiko Iwai | Janice Kawaye |
| Mitsuhiko Tsuburaya | Ikue Ōtani | Erika Harlacher |
| Genta Kojima | Wataru Takagi | Andrew Russel |
| Heizo Hattori | Kazuhiro Yamaji | Rick Zieff |
| Shizuka Hattori | Masako Katsuki | |
| Sonoko Suzuki | Naoko Matsui | Minx Le |
| Ginshiro Toyama | Masaki Terasoma | Kyle Hebert |
| Momiji Ooka | Satsuki Yukino | Faye Mata |
| Muga Iori | Daisuke Ono | Grant George |
| Hiroshi Agasa | Kenichi Ogata | Michael Sorich |
| Koji Sekine | Daisuke Miyagawa | Jon Allen |
| Mikiko Hiramoto | Riho Yoshioka | Ryan Bartley |

== Production ==
Aoyama cited the live-action adaptations of Yuki Suetsugu's manga series Chihayafuru among his inspirations for making Hyakunin Isshu and karuta subjects of a Case Closed film. He noted the Kyoto-based Karuta Queen, or national champion in the women's division, as depicted in Chihayafuru, as the model for characters in The Crimson Love Letter. The visual poster for this film was unveiled on January 17, 2017.

== Music ==
The film's theme song is "Togetsukyō ~Kimi Omō~" (渡月橋 〜君 想ふ〜) by Mai Kuraki. The song reached number five on the Oricon Singles Chart. The single has sold 326,305 units in Japan, including 76,305 physical units and 250,000 digital downloads.

== Box office ==
For its opening weekend, The Crimson Love Letter set a new franchise record by selling 987,568 tickets and earning ¥1,286,928,000. The film grossed ¥6.89 billion ($62,779,043) over its theatrical run in Japan and thereby broke the cumulative box office record for the series as well (up until it was surpassed by Zero the Enforcer). Overseas, the film grossed $3,028,087 in South Korea, Thailand and Australia. Combined, the box office total is $65,807,130 in the Asia-Pacific region.

== Release ==
An English dub produced by Bang Zoom! Entertainment was screened at Chara Expo 2019. On November 19, 2020, the film was made available for digital streaming on Amazon Prime Video. It was released on home video by Discotek Media on December 29, 2020.

== Reception ==
In January 2018, The Crimson Love Letter was nominated for the Japan Academy Film Prize of "Excellent Animation of the Year." Rebecca Silverman of Anime News Network reviewed the film in 2020. While finding criticism in the romantic subplot being weak and the overarching mystery requiring some karuta knowledge to solve it, she praised the "beautiful use of color and animation" and the comradery between Conan and Heiji, concluding that: "The Crimson Love Letter is an all-around enjoyable film. The mystery is interesting and fair play, the characters' interactions are fun, and the whole thing is very nice to look at."
