= Beautiful (Mai Kuraki song) =

Single by Mai Kuraki

from the album All My Best
- B-side: "Wana"
- Released: June 10, 2009
- Recorded: 2009
- Genre: J-pop
- Length: 12:25
- Label: Northern Music
- Songwriter(s): Mai Kuraki, Song Yang Ha(송양하).
- Producer(s): Mai Kuraki, Daiko Nagato

Mai Kuraki singles chronology
"Puzzle/Revive" (2009)	"Beautiful" (2009)	"Eien Yori Nagaku/Drive me crazy" (2010)

"Beautiful" is Mai Kuraki's thirty-second single, released on June 10, 2009. The single comes in two formats: limited CD+DVD edition and regular edition. It sold 29,446 copies in its first week and peaked at #2.

== Content ==
The title song, "Beautiful", is being used in Kose Cosmeport's "Salon Style" commercials since early June 2009.

To promote the single, Kuraki made her second appearance on TV Asahi's "Music Station" on June 12 as well as appearing on other TV programs such as NTV's "Music Fighter" and NHK's "Music Japan" on June 14. She also held four in-store events at Shinjuku's "Flags" (6/10), Tressa Yokohama (6/13), LaLaport Tokyo-Bay (6/13) and Nagoya's "Asunal Kanayama", entitled "Mai Kuraki 10th Anniversary Event: Beautiful", where Kuraki gave away postcard sets to audience members.

"Beautiful" debuted on the daily Oricon charts at #1 and stayed at the top for four days, however it only managed to rank at #2 on the weekly charts due to the unexpected boost in sales of Girl Next Door's "Infinity" on the last eligible day, which resulted in their first #1 charting single. "Beautiful" is Kuraki's second Top 3 entry in a row and her first single to reach the second spot in six years, since "Make My Day". With "Beautiful", Kuraki updated her own record for being the only female artist to have all of her 32 singles enter the Top 10.

== Commercial performance ==
"Beautiful" became the first number daily one single written by a South Korean songwriter in Japan.

== Usage in media ==
- Kose Cosmeport "Salon Style" CM song (#1)
- NTV "Sukkiri!!" June theme song (#1)

== Track listing ==
All lyrics are written by Mai Kuraki

CD
No.	Title	Music	Arranger(s)	Length
1.	"Beautiful"	Song Yang Ha (송양하)	Daisuke Ikeda	4:31
2.	"Wana"	Silver Stream	Silver Stream	3:24
3.	"Beautiful" (Instrumental)	Song Yang Ha	Daisuke Ikeda	4:30

Limited Edition DVD
No.	Title	Length
1.	"Beautiful" (Music video)

== Charts ==
=== Oricon Sales Chart ===
Release	Chart	Peak Position	First Day/Week Sales	Sales Total	Chart Run
June 10, 2009	Oricon Daily Singles Chart	1	7,512		
June 10, 2009	Oricon Weekly Singles Chart	2	29,446	36,434	6 weeks
June 10, 2009	Oricon Monthly Singles Chart	17			
June 10, 2009	Oricon Yearly Singles Chart				

=== Billboard Japan Sales Chart ===
Release	Chart	Peak Position
June 10, 2009	Billboard Japan Hot 100	5
June 10, 2009	Billboard Japan Hot Singles Sales	1
