= Muteki na Heart =

- Standard edition/digital download cover

Single by Mai Kuraki

from the album Mai Kuraki Best 151A: Love & Hope
- Released: August 27, 2014
- Recorded: 2014
- Genre: J-pop
- Length: 3:25
- Label: Northern Music
- Songwriter(s): Mai Kuraki; Yue Mochizuki; Takahiro Hiraga; Hirokazu Tajiri; Shun Sato
- Producer(s): Mai Kuraki, KANNONJI

Mai Kuraki singles chronology
"Wake Me Up" (2014)	"Muteki na Heart" / "Stand by You" (2014)	"Yesterday Love" (2017)

Music video
- "Muteki na Heart" on YouTube

"Muteki na Heart" (無敵なハート, lit. "Invincible Heart") is a song by Japanese singer songwriter Mai Kuraki, taken from her third compilation album Mai Kuraki Best 151A: Love & Hope (2014). It was released on August 27, 2014, and served as the theme song to the Japanese animation Case Closed. It was released as a double-A side with "Stand by You".

== Music video ==
A short version of the official music video was first released on Kuraki's official YouTube account on October 10, 2014. As of August 2022, it has received over 1,090,000 views on YouTube.

== Track listing ==
Standard edition/Limited edition A/FC & Musing edition
No.	Title	Writer(s)	Arranger(s)	Length
1.	"Muteki na Heart"	Mai Kuraki; Yue Mochizuki; Takahiro Hiraga	Hirokazu Tajiri; Shun Sato	3:25
2.	"Stand by You"	Kuraki; Akihito Tokunaga	Tokunaga	5:26
3.	"Muteki na Heart" (Instrumental)	Kuraki; Mochizuki; Hiraga	Tajiri; Sato	3:25
4.	"Stand by You" (Instrumental)	Tokunaga	Tokunaga	5:22
Total length:				17:39

DVD (Limited edition A)
No.	Title	Length
1.	"Muteki na Heart" (music video)

Limited edition B
No.	Title	Writer(s)	Arranger(s)	Length
1.	"Stand by You"	Kuraki; Akihito Tokunaga	Tokunaga	5:24
2.	"Muteki na Heart"	Mai Kuraki; Yue Mochizuki; Takahiro Hiraga	Hirokazu Tajiri; Shun Sato	3:27
3.	"Stand by You" (Instrumental)	Tokunaga	Tokunaga	5:24
4.	"Muteki na Heart" (Instrumental)	Kuraki; Mochizuki; Hiraga	Tajiri; Sato	3:24
Total length:				17:40

DVD (Limited edition B)
No.	Title	Length
1.	"Stand by You" (music video)

Digital download
No.	Title	Writer(s)	Arranger(s)	Length
1.	"Muteki na Heart"	Mai Kuraki; Yue Mochizuki; Takahiro Hiraga	Hirokazu Tajiri; Shun Sato	3:25
2.	"Stand by You"	Kuraki; Akihito Tokunaga	Tokunaga	5:26
Total length:				8:51

== Charts ==
=== Weekly charts ===
Chart (2014)	Peak position
Japan (Oricon)	5
Japan (Japan Hot 100)	6
Japan (Japan Hot Animation)	3

=== Monthly charts ===
Chart (2014)	Peak position
Japan (Oricon)	21

=== Year-end charts ===
Chart (2014)	Position
Japan (Oricon)	240

== Certification and sales ==
Region	Certification	Certified units/sales
Japan (RIAJ)		29,517 (physical sales)

== Release history ==
Region	Date	Format	Label
Japan	August 27, 2014	CD single (Standard edition)	Northern Music
Japan	August 27, 2014	CD single/DVD (Limited edition A)	Northern Music
Japan	August 27, 2014	CD single (Limited edition B)	Northern Music
Japan	August 27, 2014	CD single (Musing & FC edition)	Northern Music
Japan	August 27, 2014	Digital download	Northern Music
