= Try Again (Mai Kuraki song) =

- Standard edition/digital download cover

Single by Mai Kuraki

from the album Mai Kuraki Best 151A: Love & Hope
- B-side: "Sakura Sakura..."
- Released: February 6, 2013
- Genre: J-pop; dance pop
- Length: 4:29
- Label: Northern Music
- Songwriter(s): Mai Kuraki; Akihito Tokunaga
- Producer(s): Mai Kuraki; KANNONJI

Mai Kuraki singles chronology
"Koi ni Koishite" / "Special Morning Day to You" (2012)	"Try Again" (2013)	"Wake Me Up" (2014)

Music video
- "Try Again" on YouTube

"Try Again" is a song by Japanese singer songwriter Mai Kuraki, taken from her third compilation album Mai Kuraki Best 151A: Love & Hope (2014). It was released on 6 February 2013 by Northern Music. The song was written by Kuraki herself and her long-time collaborator Akihito Tokunaga.This is the 35th opening theme of the Japanese animated series Case Closed(Detective Conan).

== Commercial performance ==
"Try Again" debuted at number 7 on the Oricon Weekly Singles Chart, selling 13,900 physical copies. The song charted on the chart for 8 weeks and has sold 20,237 physical copies, which is her lowest selling single to date.

== Music video ==
A short version of the official music video was first released on Kuraki's official YouTube account on 18 January 2013. As of August 2022, it has received over 1.24 million views on YouTube. A full version of the video is included in the DVD accompanies limited edition of the single.

== Track listing ==
CD
No.	Title	Writer(s)	Arranger(s)	Length
1.	"Try Again"	Mai Kuraki; Akihito Tokunaga	Cybersound	4:29
2.	"Sakura Sakura..."	Kuraki; Aika Ohno	Ryo Hayashi	4:46
3.	"Try Again" (Instrumental)	Kuraki; Tokunaga	Cybersound	4:29
4.	"Sakura Sakura..." (Instrumental)	Kuraki; Ohno	Hayashi	4:46

Limited edition DVD
No.	Title	Length
1.	"Try Again" (Music Clip)

Detective Conan edition DVD
No.	Title	Length
1.	"Try Again" (Detective Conan Opening Movie)

Digital download
No.	Title	Writer(s)	Arranger(s)	Length
1.	"Try Again"	Mai Kuraki; Akihito Tokunaga	Cybersound	4:29
2.	"Sakura Sakura..."	Kuraki; Aika Ohno	Ryo Hayashi	4:46

== Charts ==
=== Weekly charts ===
Chart (2013)	Peak position
Japan (Oricon)	7
Japan (Japan Hot 100)	9
Japan (Japan Hot Animation)	1
Japan (Japan Top Singles Sales)	8
Japan (Japan Top Airplay)	22

=== Monthly charts ===
Chart (2013)	Peak position
Japan (Oricon)	20

=== Year-end charts ===
Chart (2013)	Position
Japan (Oricon)	355

== Certification and sales ==
Region	Certification	Certified units/sales
Japan (RIAJ)		20,237 (physical sales)

== Release history ==
Region	Date	Format	Label
Japan	April 12, 2017	CD single (Standard edition)	Northern Music
Japan	April 12, 2017	CD single/DVD (Limited edition)	Northern Music
Japan	April 12, 2017	CD single/DVD (Detective Conan edition)	Northern Music
Japan	April 12, 2017	CD single (Musing & FC edition)	Northern Music
Japan	April 12, 2017	Digital download	Northern Music
