= Sokenbicha =

Blended tea brand by Coca-Cola Japan

Sokenbicha (爽健美茶, Sōkenbicha) (/ˌsoʊkənˈbiːtʃə/; Japanese pronunciation: [soːkenbit͡ɕa]) is a Japanese blended tea brand of The Coca-Cola Company Introduced first to the Japanese market in 1993, it became available to the U.S. market in October 2010.

In the U.S., Sokenbicha features a line of five blended teas inspired by the teachings of Kampo. The product is endorsed and formulated in partnership with Nihondo, Japan's largest Kampo boutique. The products are zero calorie and unsweetened.

== U.S. products ==
Bottle size: 15.2 fl oz/450 ml

In the U.S., Sokenbicha is sold in the following five varieties:

- Revive – Crisp Oolong Tea blend with natural botanicals. Ingredients include: Oolong Tea Leaves, Black Tea Leaves, Rose Petals, Rose Hips, Ginseng.
- Defend – Mild Oolong Tea blend with natural botanicals. Ingredients include: Oolong Tea Leaves, Black Tea Leaves, Guava Leaves, Ginseng.
- Purify – Aromatic Green Tea blend with natural botanicals. Ingredients include: Green Tea Leaves, Oolong Tea Leaves, Black Tea Leaves, Chamomile, Aloe.
- Shape – Bold Barley Tea blend with natural botanicals. Ingredients include: Roasted Pearl Barley, Roasted Rice, Pu'er Tea Leaves, Green Tea Leaves, Roasted Brown Rice, Young Barley Leaves.
- Skin – Full-bodied Barley Tea blend with natural botanicals. Ingredients include: Roasted Pearl Barley, Roasted Rice, Pu'er Tea Leaves, Green Tea Leaves, Roasted Brown Rice, Young Barley Leaves, Cinnamon, Ginger.
