= Yesterday Love =

- Standard edition cover

Single by Mai Kuraki

from the album Smile
- Released: January 11, 2017
- Recorded: 2017
- Genre: J-pop
- Length: 4:55
- Label: Northern Music
- Songwriter(s): Mai Kuraki; Daiko Nagato; Keiya Kubota; Yumeto Tsurusawa
- Producer(s): Mai Kuraki; KANNONJI

Mai Kuraki singles chronology
"Muteki na Heart" / "Stand by You" (2014)	"Yesterday Love" (2017)	"Togetsukyo (Kimi Omou)" (2017)

Music video
- "Yesterday Love" on YouTube

"Yesterday Love" (stylized as "YESTERDAY LOVE") is a song by Japanese singer songwriter Mai Kuraki, taken from her eleventh studio album Smile (2017). It was released on January 11, 2017 digitally and as a video single by Northern Music. The song was used as the ending fifty-third theme to the animation TV program Case Closed.

== Commercial performance ==
"Yesterday Love" debuted at number 6 on the Oricon Weekly Blu-ray Chart and has sold over 6,000 copies.

== Live performance ==
On January 14, 2017, Kuraki performed "Yesterday Love" and "Love, Day After Tomorrow" on Music Fair. In the performance of "Love, Day After Tomorrow", she collaborated with Ami, Reina Washio and Shizuka, the members of the Japanese girl group, E-girls.

On January 27, 2017, Kuraki performed the song on Music Station.

== Music video ==
A short version of the official music video was first released on Kuraki's official YouTube account on 29 December 2016. The video adopts the technique of Virtual reality. As of August 2022, it has received over 380,000 views on YouTube. The video was directed by Atsunori Toshi.

== Track listing ==
DVD, Blu-ray
No.	Title	Writer(s)	Arranger(s)	Length
1.	"Yesterday Love" (Music video)	Mai Kuraki; Daiko Nagato; Keiya Kubota	Yumeto Tsurusawa

Digital download, CD single
No.	Title	Writer(s)	Arranger(s)	Length
1.	"Yesterday Love"	Kuraki; Nagato; Kubota	Tsurusawa	4:55
Total length:				4:55

== Charts ==
=== Weekly charts ===
Chart (2017)	Peak position
Japan (Oricon)	6

== Certification and sales ==
Region	Certification	Certified units/sales
Japan (RIAJ)		6,099 (physical sales)

== Release history ==
Region	Date	Format	Label
Japan	January 11, 2017	Digital download	Northern Music
Japan	January 11, 2017	DVD (Standard edition)	Northern Music
Japan	January 11, 2017	Blu-ray (Standard edition)	Northern Music
Japan	January 11, 2017	DVD+Blu-ray (Limited edition)	Northern Music
Japan	January 11, 2017	DVD+Blu-ray (Musing & FC edition)	Northern Music
Japan	January 11, 2017	CD single (Exclusive release for rental CD stores)	Northern Music
