= Puok District =

Puok ស្រុកពួក
- District (srok)
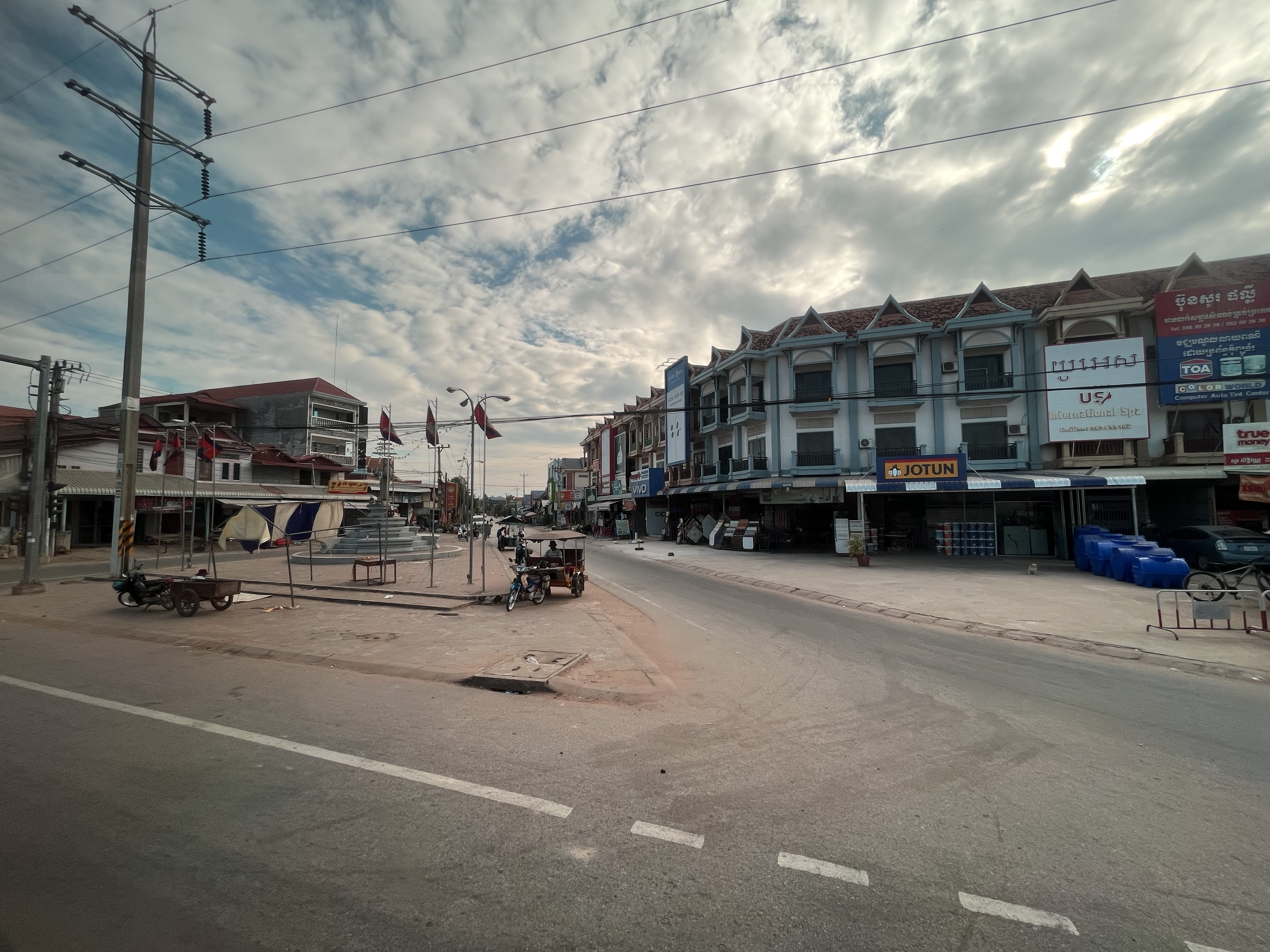
- Puok

- District location in Siem Reap Province
- Coordinates: 13°25′N 103°40′E
- Country: Cambodia
- Province: Siem Reap
- Communes: 14
- Villages: 132

Area
  - Total: 1,212 km^{2} (468 sq mi)

Population (2019)
  - Total: 128,214
- Time zone: +7
- Geocode: 1707

Puok (Khmer: ស្រុកពួក) is a district in Siem Reap Province, Cambodia. It covers an area of approximately 1,212 km^{2} (468 sq mi) and had a population of 128,214 in 2019. It is subdivided into 14 communes and 132 villages.

== Geography ==
Puok is one of the eleven districts (srok) of Siem Reap province, Cambodia. It covered a total area of approximately 1,212 km^{2} (468 sq mi), and is the third largest district by area in the province. Of the total land area, approximately 433.06 km^{2} (167.21 sq mi) of the land area was occupied by forests, 575.64 km^{2} (222.26 sq mi) was classified as cultivable land, and 203.3 km^{2} (78.5 sq mi) as built-up land. The district is located along the Tonlé Sap Lake and includes several floating villages on the lake.

== Administration ==
The district is headed by a district governor. Puok District is subdivided into 14 communes (khum) – Sasar Sdam, Doun Kaev, Kdei Run, Kaev Poar, Khnat, Lvea, Mukh Paen, Pou Treay, Puok, Prey Chruk, Reul, Samraong Yea, Trei Nhoar, and Yeang. The district administration office is located approximately 1 km (0.62 mi) from the commune office of Sasar Sdam, 3 km (1.9 mi) from Doun Kaev, 3 km (1.9 mi) from Kdei Run, 4 km (2.5 mi) from Kaev Poar, 5 km (3.1 mi) from Khnat, 8 km (5.0 mi) from Lvea, 11 km (6.8 mi) from Mukh Paen, 15 km (9.3 mi) from Puok, 16 km (9.9 mi) from Pou Treay, 19 km (12 mi) from Prey Chruk, 19 km (12 mi) from Reul, 22 km (14 mi) from Samraong Yea, 24 km (15 mi) from Trei Nhoar, and 30 km (19 mi) from Yeang. The 14 communes are further subdivided into 132 villages (phum), which are each headed by a village chief.

Administrative divisions
Commune	Phums (Villages)
Sasar Sdam	Svay, Sasar Sdam, Kouk Kandal, Kouk Run, Kouk Chas, Pongro Thmei, Kouk Pnov, Kouk Chrey, Khcheay, Kouk Tnaot, Damnak Slanh, Pak Pan, Chan Ta Say, Pongro Chas
Doun Keo	Kouk Pnov, Antangkon, Ta Kam, Doun Kaev, Lbeuk, Tnaot Chrum, Prasat Char, Kouk Pou, Peam, Ta Snae, Kouk Thmei, Rohal, Doun On
Kdei Run	Bangkaong, Trapeang Veaeng, Prey Yeang, Ta Pang, Lbaeuk, Kouk Pou, Kdei Run
Keo Poar	Kamphem, Prey Danghaeum, Thmei, Roka Yea, Kouk Ruessei, Kouk Pou, Svay Chek, Peam Ta Uor
Khnat	Khnat, Pralay, Kouk Snuol, Trameng, Svay, Prey Thlok, Chrolong, Kouk Trach, Ampil Peam, Boeng Khnar, Prey Kmeng, Tuek Thla
Lvea	Kumru, Doun Tro, Stueng Preah Srok, Kouk Srama, Tuol Lvieng, Kouk Thmei, Prohut, Chreas, Lvea, Roka, Preah Angk Trong, Snao
Mukh Paen	Ta Trav, Mukh Paen, Trakiet, Kouk Reang, Kouk Run, Sva Huol
Pou Treay	Pou, Treay
Puok	Puok Chas, Prayut, Kouk Chuon, Kampong Ta Yang, Kouk Srok, Ta Tok, Kouk Doung, Kouk Thmei, Puok Thmei, Chambak He, Ou Ta Prak
Prey Chruk	Prey Chruk, Ketteyos, Doun Tok, Svay Chantor, Prasat, Phlang, Prab Mai, Chres, Pradak, Chranieng, Ta Mouk, Pongro
Reul	Kouk Veal, Tumrueng, Reul, Trapeang Svay, Trapeang Ruessei, Prolit, K'aek Tum, Rumduol, Kbal Krapeu, Trapeang Thum, Kouk Knang, Kouk Trach, Srah, Sambuor
Samraong Yea	Ta Chet, Samraong Yea, Ampil, Prasat, Doun Sva, Prey Veaeng
Trei Nhoar	Chambak Sa, Kouk Doung, Svay, Ta Hok, Thipakdei, Chuo Chakkrei, Chhuk, Trei Nhoar, Thveas, Trapeang Pring
Yeang	Soun Sa, Chong Thnal, Yeang, Sokh San, Kanhchan Kuy

== Demographics ==
According to the 1998 population census, Puok District had a population of 110,863, including 53,091 males and 57,772 females. The district had 20,423 households, with an average household size of 5.4 persons. According to the 2008 census, the population had increased to 112,882, including 54,880 males and 58,002 females. The district had 22,506 households, with an average household size of 5.0 persons. As per the 2019 census, the population was 128,214, including 62,192 males and 66,022 females. The district had 28,850 households, with an average household size of 4.4 persons.

== Economy ==
In 2008, approximately 92% of families in the district were engaged primarily in agriculture, accounting for 20,290 families. About 19,266 of these families were primarily engaged in rice cultivation. The remaining families were engaged in services (4%), trade (3%), and other occupations. In 2008, rice was cultivated across 23,965 ha (59,220 acres) during the wet season, and 3,212 ha (7,940 acres) during the dry season. The rice production was approximately 31,523 tonnes during the wet season and 5,982 tonnes during the dry season. Other crops cultivated in the district include maize, mung bean, and cassava.
