= Summer Time Gone =

- Standard edition cover

Single by Mai Kuraki

from the album Future Kiss
- A-side: "Summer Time Gone"
- B-side: "Anywhere"
- Released: August 31, 2010
- Recorded: 2010
- Genre: J-pop
- Length: 4:24
- Label: Northern Music
- Songwriters: Mai Kuraki; Aika Ohno; Takeshi Hayama
- Producer: Kannonji

Mai Kuraki singles chronology
"Eien Yori Nagaku/Drive me crazy" (2010)	"Summer Time Gone" (2010)	"1000 Mankai no Kiss" (2011)

"Summer Time Gone" is a song by Japanese singer-songwriter Mai Kuraki. The song was released as the fourth single from her ninth studio album, Future Kiss, on August 31, 2010, through Northern Music.

== Commercial performance ==
"Summer Time Gone" reached number four on the Oricon Weekly Singles Chart, selling 25,332 physical copies in its first week.

== In popular culture ==
"Summer Time Gone" was featured in the TV commercial for the cosmetic line, Esprique Precious by Kosé, as well as served as the theme song to the animated television series Detective Conan and Music Focus.

== Track listing ==
All lyrics are written by Mai Kuraki.

CD single
No.	Title	Music	Arranger(s)	Length
1.	"Summer Time Gone"	Aika Ohno	Takeshi Hayama	4:24
2.	"Anywhere"	Jon Carin; Perry Geyer	Jon Carin; Perry Geyer	5:03
3.	"Summer Time Gone" (Instrumental)	Ohno	Hayama	4:24

Limited edition bonus DVD
No.	Title	Length
1.	"Mai Kuraki x Kosé Special Movie"

== Charts ==
=== Daily charts ===
Chart (2010)	Peak position
Oricon Daily Singles Chart	1

=== Weekly charts ===
Chart (2010)	Peak position
Oricon Weekly Singles Chart	4
Japan Hot 100 (Billboard Japan)	8
Taiwan (G-Music)	13
Taiwan J-Pop Chart (G-Music)	4

=== Monthly charts ===
Chart (2010)	Peak position
Oricon Monthly Singles Chart	15

== Certification and sales ==
Region	Certification	Certified units/sales
Japan (RIAJ)		33,378 (physical sales)
