= Detective Conan: The Raven Chaser =

Detective Conan: The Jet Black Chaser
- Theatrical release poster
- Kanji: 名探偵コナン 漆黒の追跡者(チェイサー)
- Revised Hepburn: Meitantei Konan: Shikkoku no Cheisā
- Directed by: Yasuichiro Yamamoto
- Written by: Kazunari Kochi
- Based on: Case Closed by Gosho Aoyama
- Produced by: Koji Ishikawa; Masahito Yoshioka; Michihiko Suwa
- Starring: Minami Takayama; Kappei Yamaguchi; Akira Kamiya; Wakana Yamazaki; Megumi Hayashibara; Yuji Mikimoto; Yukitoshi Hori; Mami Koyama; Fumihiko Tachiki; Hiroyuki Kinoshita; Kikuko Inoue; Kenichi Ogata; Ryo Horikawa; Yuko Miyamura; Yukiko Iwai; Ikue Ohtani; Wataru Takagi; Naoko Matsui; Daigo; Masashi Sugawara; Fumiko Orikasa; Atsuko Yuya; Yuuji Takada; Ami Koshimizu; Akio Ōtsuka; Toshio Furukawa; Isshin Chiba; Kazuhiko Inoue; Chafurin; Seizō Katō
- Cinematography: Hironobu Hirabayashi
- Edited by: Keiji Kijima; Naoki Hasegawa; Terumitsu Okada
- Music by: Katsuo Ono
- Production company: TMS Entertainment
- Distributed by: Toho
- Release date: April 18, 2009
- Running time: 111 minutes
- Country: Japan
- Language: Japanese
- Box office: $39,664,359

Detective Conan: The Raven Chaser (名探偵コナン 漆黒の追跡者(チェイサー), Meitantei Konan: Shikkoku no Cheisā) is a 2009 Japanese animated mystery thriller film and the thirteenth film installment of the Case Closed manga and anime series. The film was released in Japan on April 18, 2009. This film earned 3.9 billion yen in the domestic Japanese box office, making it the highest-grossing film in the Case Closed series so far. The story of the film involving a new member from the Black Organization that shrunk Shinichi Kudo's body manages to find out about Shinichi's transformation into Conan Edogawa, making this discovery starts to put those around Conan in danger as Gin and the other Black Organization members start to take action.

Detective Conan: The Raven Chaser involves active members of the Black Organization, making this the Black Organization's second appearance in a film since Countdown to Heaven. A special preview to the film aired in Japan on Animax.

The film was nominated for Best Animated Film at the 2010 Awards of the Japanese Academy.

== Plot ==
A man driving down a hillside road suddenly realizes that his car Alfa Romeo Brera's brakes don't work. Traveling at a high speed, his car crashes into a toll station. As a man succumbs to his injuries, he leaves a mysterious dying message: "Tanabata kyo" with a mysterious Mahjong tile next to him, linking this case to six other homicide cases in Tokyo, Kanagawa, Shizuoka, Nagano, and other places in Japan. Because of the Mahjong tiles left beside each victim, the police conclude that the same person or organization committed these large-scale murders. The police of prefectures across Japan unite to find the murderer.

After a police conference about this case, Conan Edogawa discovers a police officer walking out of the building and entering a black Porsche. He concludes that a Black Organization member is disguised as a police officer and has infiltrated the meeting. Conan is left wondering which officer is the fake and what interest the Black Organization has in the case. On the day of Tanabata, Conan corners Vermouth in the underground parking lot of a shopping mall and interrogates her. She says that the Black Organization needs a memory chip and has a new member, "Irish".

Conan employs the help of Heiji Hattori and tries to solve the serial murder case by following the dying message lead. He and Heiji find out that two years ago, there was a fire accident in a hotel in Kyoto, and a young woman named Nanako Honjou died. The elevator could only hold seven, but eight people needed to escape. Nanako wasn't on the last elevator and couldn't escape. Conan tracks down her neighbor, Shun Sawamura, and asks him some questions. Conan finds out that Nanako and her boyfriend, Kosuke Mizutani, often went star gazing together. Conan realizes that the crime scenes form the Big Dipper constellation along with the North Star Polaris.

When the polices arrive at a deserted Tokyo Tower, Conan sneaks past them and confronts Mizutani, who confesses to the crimes and intends to commit suicide by poison. Mizutani thought one of the seven must have pushed Nanako out of the elevator during the hotel fire, but Nanako's brother, Kazuki, who was one of the seven in the elevator, shows up and testifies that she voluntarily stepped out. Conan reveals that the real murderer is Kazuki and not Mizutani because Mizutani would never commit murder to stain the memory of Nanako and his precious stars. However, Kazuki, obsessively fond of his younger sister, decided after her death to take revenge on all those who "took her away from him", including Mizutani. Meanwhile, Irish knocks the polices unconscious.

To this purpose, Kazuki tricked Mizutani to become a scapegoat by persuading him to take the blame for the revenge murders. The Mahjong tiles left at the murder scenes were deliberate clues to point the police investigation into Mizutani's direction, with the final stone pinpointing the location of Tokyo Tower - a fact which both Conan and Kogoro Mouri have managed to deduce. Kazuki threatens Conan and Mizutani with a knife; but then Kiyonaga Matsumoto interferes and incapacitates Kazuki. Conan, however, realizes that "Matsumoto" is Irish in perfect disguise, while Miwako Sato and Wataru Takagi rescues the real Matsumoto with the help of the Detective Boys. Irish claims that he doesn't want to kill Conan. He says he knows Conan's true identity but didn't tell anyone because he hates the Black Organization for killing his friend, Pisco. (Note: As depicted in the episode 178) Conan wants the memory chip, but Irish refuses to hand it over.

Soon Ran arrives at Tokyo Tower and finds Irish, who is still disguised as Matsumoto. She makes some good karate hits, but a kick to his face tears off part of his mask, thus surprising her. Irish uses this to his advantage and overpowers Ran. Irish and Conan move outside near the top, and a helicopter with Gin, Vodka, Korn, and Chianti arrives. Irish shows them the chip, and Gin orders Chianti to shoot Irish and the chip. Seriously injured by the bullet, Irish is barely alive, causing Conan tries to drag him to safety. However, Gin notices Conan and tries to shoot him, but Irish sacrifices himself by protecting Conan and dies from his gunshot wound.

The Black Organization attacks Conan with a machine gun, damaging the upper levels of the Tokyo Tower. Cornered at the top, Conan escapes by attaching his expanding suspenders to a light to act as a bungee to jump off the tower. The light then slingshots back at the Black Organization's helicopter, damaging the engine. The Black Organization manages to fly away, but the helicopter crashes soon after.

In the post credits scene, Conan is walking with Ai Haibara and Dr. Agasa through the woods to a boarded up house talking about the case, Conan mentions that Irish died before he told Conan where Matsumoto is and thanks to the Detective Boys Matsumoto was found. After Conan remembers Irish's last words, he replies in his mind that he will do what Irish wanted until the day he destroyed them, meaning he's got another reason to fight the Black Organization.

== Cast ==
- Minami Takayama as Conan Edogawa
  - Kappei Yamaguchi as Shinichi Kudo
- Akira Kamiya as Kogoro Mouri
- Wakana Yamazaki as Ran Mouri
- Megumi Hayashibara as Ai Haibara
- Yukitoshi Hori as Gin
- Chafurin as Juzo Megure
- Atsuko Yuya as Miwako Sato
- Masashi Sugawara as Kazuki Honjo
- Fumiko Orikasa as Nanako Honjo, Kazuki's late sister.
- Ryo Horikawa as Heiji Hattori
- Yuko Miyamura as Kazuha Toyama
- Yuuji Takada as Kansuke Yamato
- Naoko Matsui as Sonoko Suzuki
- Ryotaro Okiayu as Fumimaro Ayanokoji
- Seizō Katō as Kiyonaga Matsumoto
- Toshio Furukawa as Misao Yamamura
- Wataru Takagi as Genta Kojima and Wataru Takagi
- Yukiko Iwai as Ayumi Yoshida
- Ikue Ohtani as Mitsuhiko Tsuburaya
- Akio Ōtsuka as Juugo Yokomizo
  - Ōtsuka also voices Sango Yokomizo, Juugo's older brother
- Ami Koshimizu as Yui Uehara
- Fumihiko Tachiki as Vodka
- Hiroyuki Kinoshita as Korn
- Isshin Chiba as Kazunobu Chiba
- Kazuhiko Inoue as Ninzaburou Shiratori
- Kenichi Ogata as Dr. Hiroshi Agasa
- Kikuko Inoue as Chianti
- Mami Koyama as Vermouth
- Daigo as Kosuke Mizutani, Nanako's boyfriend.
- Nobutoshi Canna as Shun Sawamura
- Tomohiro Nishimura as Minoru Fukase, the wanted fugitive who takes disguised Vermouth hostage but was stopped by Conan.
- Nana Mizuki as Risa Yoshi, Minoru's girlfriend who attempts to stab Yui in retialliation for arresting Minoru but stabbing Megure instead when he shielding Yui.
- Yuji Mikimoto as Irish

== Soundtrack ==
The film's theme song is "PUZZLE" by Mai Kuraki. It was released along with music for the broadcast anime's 25th opening "Revive" as double A-side singles on April 1, 2009. Along with Countdown to Heaven and Crossroad in the Ancient Capital, The Raven Chaser is the third Case Closed film in which Mai Kuraki wrote the theme song.

The official soundtrack was released on April 4, 2009. It costs approximately ¥2857, ¥3000 with tax included; US$31.46.

== Home media ==
=== DVD ===
The standard edition DVD was released on 10. July. 2013.

Three versions are to be released: the limited DVD version will include 2 discs with the film, the trailer, Magic File #3, and other extras with 5.1 Dolby Digital HD Surround Sound audio. The regular DVD will only include the film and the trailer with 5.1 Dolby Digital HD Surround Sound audio. The Blu-ray version includes the HD format of the regular DVD version. The limited DVD cost ¥6720, the regular DVD cost ¥5460, and the Blu-ray version cost ¥6510. The DVD will only be released in Japan, Europe, Middle East, and South Africa.

== Release ==
This film was released for free, available to view for one week, on TMS Entertainment's English YouTube channel as part of the "Detective Conan: Cinema Saturdays" promotion, on August 2, 2025, with English subtitles. It was the first time this film had ever been officially premiered in North America.

== Awards ==
The Blu-ray Disc release was awarded the Best Interactivity Award by Digital Entertainment Group Japan.
