= Puzzle/Revive =

"Puzzle"

Single by Mai Kuraki

from the album All My Best
- A-side: "Revive" (double A-side)
- Released: April 1, 2009
- Recorded: 2009
- Genre: J-pop
- Label: Northern Music
- Songwriters: Mai Kuraki, Yue Mochizuki, Hiraga Takahiro, Aika Ohno

Mai Kuraki singles chronology
"24 Xmas Time" (2008)	"Puzzle" / "Revive" (2009)	"Beautiful" (2009)

"Puzzle"/"Revive" is Mai Kuraki's thirty-first single, released as a double A-side on April 1, 2009. "Puzzle" was used for the thirteenth Detective Conan film Detective Conan: The Raven Chaser, and "Revive" was used as the twenty-fifth opening theme for the Detective Conan TV series.

On February 24, Kuraki's official website announced the single had been pushed ahead two weeks due to overwhelming fan demand. "Puzzle/Revive" debuted at number 3 on the Oricon single chart, making it her first single to enter the Top 3 in nearly five years, since 2004's "Ashita e Kakeru Hashi".

== Usage in media ==
- "Puzzle" - "Detective Conan: The Raven Chaser" ending theme song
- "Revive" - "Detective Conan" twenty-fifth opening theme

== Track listing ==
All lyrics are written by Mai Kuraki.

"Puzzle/Revive" Limited Edition
No.	Title	Length
1.	"Puzzle"	3:59
2.	"Revive"	4:42
3.	"The Rose: Melody In the Sky (Acoustic Live Ver.)"	2:40
4.	"Puzzle (Instrumental)"	3:59
5.	"Revive (Instrumental)"	4:39

"Puzzle/Revive" Regular Edition
No.	Title	Length
1.	"Puzzle"	3:59
2.	"Revive"	4:42
3.	"Puzzle (Instrumental)"	3:59
4.	"Revive (Instrumental)"	4:39

== Personnel ==
"Revive"

- Vocals: Mai Kuraki
- Music written by Aika Ohno
- Arranged by Miguel Sa Pessoa
- Guitars: Yuji Hamasaki
- Bass: Baron Browne
- Computer Manipulations: Perry Geyer
- Keyboards: Miguel Sa Pessoa
- Chorus: Mai Kuraki

== Charts ==
=== Oricon Sales Chart ===
Release	Chart	Peak Position	First Day/Week Sales	Sales Total	Chart Run
April 1, 2009	Oricon Daily Singles Chart	1	10,510		
April 1, 2009	Oricon Weekly Singles Chart	3	29,445	48,328	11 weeks
April 1, 2009	Oricon Monthly Singles Chart	13			
April 1, 2009	Oricon Yearly Singles Chart				

=== Billboard Japan Sales Chart ===
Release	Chart	Peak Position
April 1, 2009	Billboard Japan Hot 100	6
April 1, 2009	Billboard Japan Hot 100 Airplay	16
April 1, 2009	Billboard Japan Hot Singles Sales	5
