= The Scarlet School Trip =

Special episode of Detective Conan

The 95th tankōbon of Case Closed released by Viz Media on July 8, 2025 where the final 2 chapters of the arc are encapsulated

The Scarlet School Trip (Japanese: 紅の修学旅行, Hepburn: Kurenai no Shūgakuryokō) is the 290th story arc of the Japanese manga series Case Closed, known as Meitantei Conan (名探偵コナン, lit. Great Detective Conan, officially translated as Detective Conan) in Japan. The arc was published in Shogakukan's Weekly Shōnen Sunday magazine between August and September 2017 in issues 37 to 44 and consisted of 6 chapters. The individual chapters were then collected into tankōbon volumes 94 and 95 which were released in Japan on December 18, 2017, and October 18, 2018, respectively. The majority were encapsulated into the 94th volume which became the 14th best selling manga in the first half of 2018.

The Case Closed anime adapted the arc into episodes 927–928 and was broadcast on Nippon Television Network System between January 5, 2019, and January 12, 2019. The 2 episodes were among the top 3 watched weekly anime during its run. The arc follows Shinichi Kudo as he is involved several murder cases on his school field trip. In the beginning of the series, Shinichi was poisoned and turned into a child. Since then, he had been using the identity Conan Edogawa whilst keeping his true identity a secret.

Viz Media localized and published the two volumes on April 8, 2025, and July 8, 2025.

== Plot ==
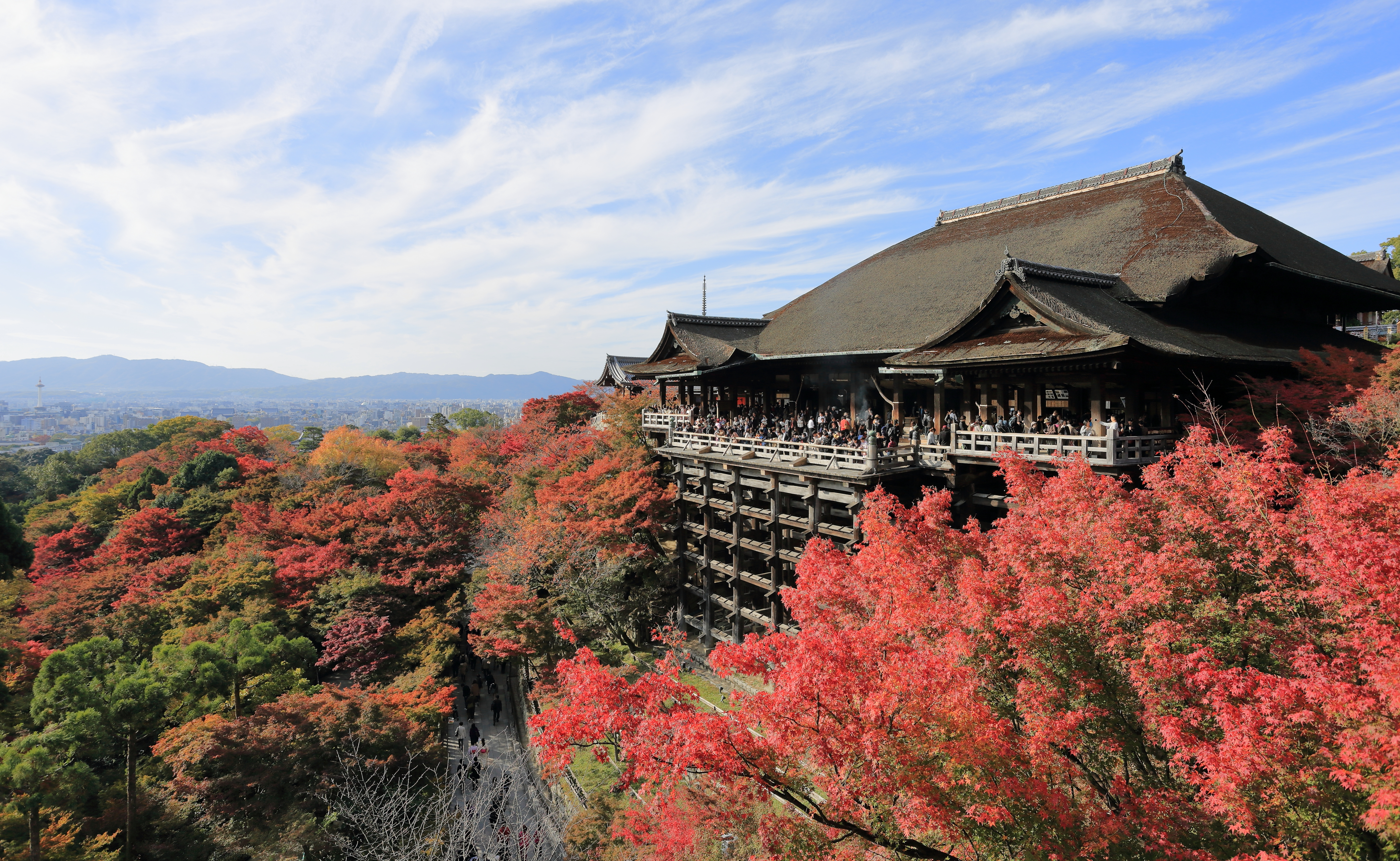
The Kiyomizu-dera in autumn, which serves as the background of this story

Shinichi takes part in a school field trip to Kyoto with Ran and friends, thanks to the series of antidotes Ai Haibara gave Conan. On the Kiyomizu-dera, Shinichi meets Keiko, an actress and old friend of his mother, who stays in the same hotel as Shinichi and his class, with some university friends with which she shot a movie revolving around a tengu and other monsters. She asks Shinichi to help her to decipher a mysterious code written and sent by their late friend Michio Dekuri, who committed suicide some time ago. A few days before a murder spree in Kyoto, one of the previous members of the filming team who had written the first version of the story killed himself by throwing himself from the top of the Kiyomizu-dera shrine after he thought he was forgotten by the others since they did not put his name in the credits or so what he thought. On the last day of the pre-open of the movie, Mineto Mayama receives a phone call from an unknown person telling him to go to the Kiyomizu Butai. Heading there, he sees a mysterious and invisible silhouette approaching him with bloody footprints before grabbing him and throwing him over the railing saying that he is Michio Dekuri reincarnated as a tengu after falling and that he'll seek revenge. He luckily survives without any injuries as Shinichi, Heiji, Yusaku, and Masumi already planned the culprit's doings and prepared a mattress under the shrine. Shinichi and Heiji then confront the culprit.

Shinichi, Heiji and Masumi reveal the culprit to be Riki Agata. Dekuri's symbol was actually to be considered as a compass, and according to it, and to the code's kanji characters' position, and to the fact that these characters were extracted from some of Kyoto's streets' and districts' names corresponding to the position, the code can be understood as a succession of kanji characters who correspond to the first or second syllables of the streets' or districts' names they originate, from left to right, revealing messages of murderous intent. Agata tries to run away but gets surrounded by the police who were disguised as visitors. Agata finally confesses to being the serial killer, giving two bumps to his victims, resembling a tengu. Agata asked them for an explanation, saying Dekuri cried unceasingly, and the three men replied they were so happy their plan had worked perfectly, thus implying they wanted to humiliate their depressed friend and never had the intention to put his name in the movie. But Keiko and Mayama turn up and say that the producers had modified some very important typology spaces in the credits, preventing the name "Michio Dekuri" from appearing. As actually the name was supposed to appear across the five people's vertical names, which is why everyone changed names and spaces. Dekuri's name was supposed to appear at the same time, and it did not because of the producers, who did not want to clear up the mistake afterwards for financial reasons. Agata was not told about it as their friends wanted Dekuri and him to discover the surprise while watching the movie together, as they were really close friends.

After the case is solved, Ran talks about a nice place that Soshi Okita had told her about and as Sonoko and Masumi start going ahead, Shinichi holds Ran back and asks her how she feels about him. Shinichi mentions Ran's meeting with Okita the previous and wonders if she has forgotten about his confession in London. In response, Ran pulls him closer by grabbing his tie and kisses him on the cheek. Shinichi moves to kiss Ran on the lips, but the antidote begins to wear off, and he flees. Heiji gives Conan a motorbike ride back to Tokyo, and Ran texts Shinichi to ask him if they are officially dating each other now. Shinichi sends Ran a mail and saying, "Of course we are dating."

== Production and release ==
The first chapter of The Scarlet School Trip arc is the 1,000th chapter of Case Closed. The arc was published in Shogakukan's Weekly Shōnen Sunday magazine between August and September 2017 in issues 37 to 44 and consisted of 6 chapters. The individual chapters were then collected into tankōbon volumes 94 and 95 which were released in Japan on December 18, 2017, and October 18, 2018, respectively.

== Anime adaptation ==
The key visual of the anime adaptation

The Scarlet School Trip story arc was aired on the Case Closed anime series as episodes 927–928 and aired between January 5, 2019, and January 12, 2019, on Nippon Television Network System. The episodes were later released on Blu-Ray on November 22, 2019. The opening theme music for the episodes were "Barairo no Jinsei" (薔薇色の人生; lit. "Rose-colored Life") and the ending theme for episode 928 was "Kimi to Koi no Mama de Owarenai Itsumo Yume no Mama ja Irarenai" (きみと恋のままで終われない いつも夢のままじゃいられない; lit. "My Love with You as it is Can Never End but I Do Not Want it to Always Remain as a Dream"), both sung by Mai Kuraki. Kuraki herself also made a guest appearance in the anime adaptation of the arc. Episode 927 was directed by Yasuichiro Yamamoto while 928 was directed by Minoru Tozawa and Akira Yoshimura. The episodes were streamed with English subtitles on Crunchyroll with episodes 927 and 928 released the same day they were broadcast in Japan.
