= Case Closed season 29 =

Season of television series

Case Closed
- Season 29
- The cover of the first DVD compilation for season twenty-nine of Detective Conan released by Shogakukan
- No. of episodes: 33

Release
- Original network: NNS (ytv)
- Original release: January 5 – November 16, 2019

Season chronology
- ← Previous; Season 28 Next → Season 30

The twenty-ninth season of the Case Closed anime was directed by Yasuichirō Yamamoto and produced by TMS Entertainment and Yomiuri Telecasting Corporation. The series is based on Gosho Aoyama's Case Closed manga series. In Japan, the series is titled Meitantei Conan (名探偵コナン, lit. Great Detective Conan, officially translated as Detective Conan) but was changed due to legal issues with the title Detective Conan. The series focuses on the adventures of teenage detective Shinichi Kudo who was turned into a child by a poison called APTX 4869, but continues working as a detective under the alias Conan Edogawa.

The episodes use four pieces of theme music: two openings and two endings. The first opening theme is Barairo no Jinsei (薔薇色の人生; lit. "Rose-colored Life") by Mai Kuraki used for episodes 927 – 940. The first ending theme is Kimi to Koi no Mama de Owarenai Itsumo Yume no Mama ja Irarenai (きみと恋のままで終われない いつも夢のままじゃいられない; lit. "My Love with You as it is Can Never End but I Do Not Want it to Always Remain as a Dream") by Mai Kuraki used for episodes 928 – 951. The second opening theme is ANSWER by Only this time used for episodes 941 – 964 in season 30. The second ending theme is Sissy Sky by Airi Miyakawa and starts at episode 952 and was used until episode 964 in season 30.

The season initially ran from January 5, 2019, through November 16, 2019, on Nippon Television Network System in Japan. The season was later collected and released in eight DVD compilations by Shogakukan between February 26, 2021, and September 24, 2021, in Japan. Crunchyroll began simulcasting the series in October 2014, starting with episode 754.

== Episode list ==
No. overall	No. in season	Title	Directed by	Written by	Original release date
927	1	"The Scarlet School Trip (Bright Red Arc) ^{1 hr.}" Transliteration: "Kurenai no Shūgakuryokō" (Japanese: 紅の修学旅行)	Yasuichiro Yamamoto	N/A	January 5, 2019
Haibara decides to give Conan the APTX 4869 antidote for his school trip under the conditions that he wait 8 hours between doses, have a plan so people don't notice him changing back into Conan, and to not stand out as Kudo Shinichi. On the trip, Shinichi runs into Kurachi Keiko, an actress who knows his mother, and she invites him to help her solve a cipher. Shinichi and the others meet the film crew who are there with Kurachi working on a film about a tengu – the actor Ihaya Shinya, the director Mayama Mineto, and the composer Agata Riki. The scriptwriter, Nishiki, got the cipher in the mail and they find out the cipher's creator, Dekuri, committed suicide recently. Shinichi and the others leave to work on the cipher while the film crew goes to dinner, but Shinichi soon receives a text from Kurachi and they come back to find Nishiki murdered in his room alone with another cipher that the murderer left. While beginning to investigate, Shinichi feels the medicine wearing off and returns to his room. It's revealed that Shinichi asked Hattori to help him by switching places with him at night while in bed. Because of Shinichi's classmates' teasing, Hattori uses the bow tie voice changer and says Shinichi and Ran kissed in London. Everyone runs to Agata's room to find a tengu on his ceiling that vanishes when he throws an ashtray at it. Later, Shinichi and the others bump into Momoji, whom they previously met in Kyoko, when meeting the film crew for lunch. Everyone, except the film crew, is drawn outside when several people in tengu masks run around the street. When they return, they find Ihaya dead just outside the restaurant with another cipher.
928	2	"The Scarlet School Trip (Crimson Love Arc) ^{1 hr.}" Transliteration: "Kurenai no Shūgakuryokō" (Japanese: 紅の修学旅行)	Yasuichiro Yamamoto Minoru Tozawa Akira Yoshimura	N/A	January 12, 2019
Shinichi solves the ciphers and is able to catch the culprit while he attempting to kill Mayama. It turns out Agata was trying to avenge Dekuri's suicide. Dekuri originally wrote the plot for the film in a comic during college and asked to be credited for the movie. Dekuri had killed himself because his name was mistakenly not included during the first screening, and Agata believed Nishiki, Ihaya, and Mayama had done it purposely. It was revealed that because of some restrictions, instead of listing his name separately, Dekuri's name was intended to be formed with the kanji or the rest of the film crew's name, and the spacing was fixed for the film's release. Shinichi returns to his classmates, and asks Ran for her response to his confession in London. Ran kisses him on the cheek, and as Shinichi is about to kiss Ran, he feels the APTX 4869 medication wearing off and has to run off, hiding in Hattori's backpack. Sera seems convinced Shinichi and Conan are one and the same regardless and is shown calling Mary and telling her an APTX 4869 antidote seems to exist. Conan hitches a ride back to Tokyo with Hattori, and Ran and Shinichi confirm over text that they're now dating.
929	3	"A Woman Standing by the Window (Part One)"; Transliteration: "Madobe ni tatazumu onna (Zenpen)" (Japanese: 窓辺にたたずむ女 (前編))	Kōichirō Kuroda	Nobuo Ōgizawa	February 2, 2019
A woman named Midorikawa Saki was walking down the street when she saw Ayumi Chan falling down. She invited her to her apartment and treat her wound. Ayumi Chan noticed her staring at something at the opposite side. Ayumi Chan bring the Detective Boys to meet Saki-san. A car accident occurred near Saki-san's work place. Conan discovered three other people glaring at Saki san and behaved suspiciously. Conan decided to investigate the three people and realised their apartment are opposite of Saki san. After checking with the three people, they discover they have nothing to do with Saki san. The Detective Boys think that they are just imagining things. However at night, Saki san was followed by someone. The next morning, Saki san fell from above and passed away.
930	4	"A Woman Standing by the Window (Part Two)"; Transliteration: "Madobe ni tatazumu onna (Kōhen)" (Japanese: 窓辺にたたずむ女 (後編))	Hiroaki Takagi	Nobuo Ōgizawa	February 9, 2019
Based on a witness, The Detective boys and Conan realised Saki san was nearly killed the previous day as well. Conan realised that this isn't an accident but a murder. Police arrived and begin to investigate. Conan figure out the trick the culprit used and solve the case.
931	5	"The Northern Kyushu Mystery Tour (Kokura Arc)"; Transliteration: "Kitakyūshū misuterītsuā (Kokura-hen)" (Japanese: 北九州ミステリーツア)	Akira Yoshimura	Toshimichi Ōkawa	February 16, 2019
Ran and Conan accompanied Kogoro to Kokura, Fukuoka for the Japanese Detective League award ceremony to accept his Best Detective Award. Kogoro decide to visit his senior from the MPD, Fukamachi Torazo, who now runs a company in Kokura. Ran decided to go sightseeing while Kogoro and Conan headed over to his office to surprise him. However, they learnt that he was hospitalised for an injury. Kiriyama Eisaku, the Managing Director request for Kogoro's help as various places in their office has been vandalised with the word "Tiger." They believed it is the work of Fukamachi's son Torahiko in order to threaten Kiriyama. Kogoro left to question the witness while Conan stay in the office to investigate. Meanwhile Ran was sightseeing when she run into Torahiko who requested her to pose as his girlfriend as some bad men are chasing after him. Kogoro saw Ran and Torahiko together and called her. The men chasing after Torahiko capture him and Ran attempt to stop them. One of the men pushed Ran and as she fell, she screamed over the phone.
932	6	"The Northern Kyushu Mystery Tour (Moji Arc)"; Transliteration: "Kitakyūshū misuterītsuā (Moji-hen)" (Japanese: 北九州ミステリーツア)	Takanori Yano	Toshimichi Ōkawa	February 23, 2019
Ran managed to stop her fall and attacked the men, knocking them unconscious. Torahiko escape together with Ran. Kogoro meet with the 2 men and they revealed to be Kokura police officers. Torahiko revealed that it wasn't him that wrote the graffiti. He is also finding the evidence about the culprit. Ran convince Torahiko not to run and come back to the office. Kogoro and the rest went back to the office and Conan tranquilized Kogoro to begin the deduction show. He solved the case and found the culprit. Meanwhile, Torahiko and Ran decided to head to the TV station to leave the evidence, Toraccha a stuffed tiger with them, not knowing that there is a bomb inside. Kogoro, Conan and the police managed to stop them. Conan kicked the stuffed Tiger, allowing it to explode in the air. Kogoro is awarded the Best Detective Award at the Japanese Detective League award ceremony. It is revealed that Fukamachi has actually regained consciousness a few days ago but lost his memories of the accident. They decided to hire Kogoro to uncover the truth. The Japanese Detective League was also created by Fukamachi to support Kogoro.
933	7	"The Thoroughbred Kidnapping (Part One)"; Transliteration: "Sarabureddo yūkai jiken (Zenpen)" (Japanese: サラブレッド誘拐事件(前編))	Minoru Tozawa	Jun'ichi Miyashita	March 9, 2019
At the horse racing site, Kogoro is once again gambling while Conan begged him to stop and go home. After the horse race, Kogoro is hired by three different people with the same request. Kogoro and Conan went to Tokuyoshi Stables to investigate and protect White Spirits, a Racing Horse whose owner Tokuyoshi Kozo has been receiving death threat a month ago. The next day, White Spirits was transported in a trailer. However, the trailer suddenly make a detour before reappearing again. After reaching the destination, Tokuyoshi realised the horse has been switched and the culprit demanded ransom. Tokuyoshi pay the ransom and threw the money off the bridge. While the police stake out for the culprit to show up, they realised the content of the bag has been switched. The culprit could have already taken the money and left. The next day, the horse blanket covering White Spirits was found covering in blood.
934	8	"The Thoroughbred Kidnapping (Part Two)"; Transliteration: "Sarabureddo yūkai jiken (Kōhen)" (Japanese: サラブレッド誘拐事件(後編))	Yujiro Abe	Jun'ichi Miyashita	March 16, 2019
Conan and Detective Takagi investigate the road and stables once again. Conan figure out the truth about the case and gather everyone at the stables. He tranquillised Kogoro and solve the case.
935	9	"The Fortune Teller and the Three Customers"; Transliteration: "Uranaishi to san'nin no kyaku" (Japanese: 占い師と三人の客)	Kōichirō Kuroda	Nobuo Ōgizawa	March 23, 2019
At a mansion, secretary Ogu Masaya found Baba Sadako, a fortune teller and medium strangled to dead. He informed the police and stated that Mori Kogoro called the previous day and invited the victim out. When Kogoro arrived at the scene, he told the police he didn't make that call and didn't know anything about the victim. Conan found a text document in the computer stating three customers who hated the victim. However based on the time of death and the timing of the text document, all three of them are framed. Conan begin to investigate and realised that culprit is still one of the three suspects. He tranquilised Kogoro and solve the case.
936	10	"Intrigue at the Food Court"; Transliteration: "Fūdokōto no inbō" (Japanese: フードコートの陰謀)	Akira Yoshimura	Takahiro Ōkura	April 13, 2019
This is the episode prior to Movie 23. Genta, Mitsuhiko and Ayumi went to Beika City Farmer's Market. Inspector Megure will also be there for a speech. They overheard three people saying having an explosive time and believe that they are planning to set off a bomb at the event. Thinking about what Conan would do in this situation, they decided to follow them. The Detective Boys ended up discovered by the trio and they explained that they are preparing ingredients for their Chicken Rice, a Singapore dish. When the Detective boys ask them about the giant star on their food truck, they say it is because they love stargazing. Thinking it is all a misunderstanding, the Detective Boys enjoy the Chicken Rice and left. They meet Detective Sato and Detective Takagi and told them about the truck. Through their conversation, Detective Sato noticed something amiss. It turn out that the trio really intended to bomb the event for revenge and the police ended up arresting them. Detective Sato explained that the star on the truck mean Singapore, a Star Country. Inspector Megure commented that the Detective Boys actually did a good job this time.
937	11	"The Killer Fist of Talos (Part One)"; Transliteration: "Kyojin Tarosu no Hissatsu Ken (Zenpen)" (Japanese: 巨人タロスの必殺拳 (前編))	Yorifusa Yamaguchi	Masaki Tsuji	April 20, 2019
Professor Agasa brought the Detective Boys and Ran to Kagami Studio. Professor Agasa has a meeting with the president while the rest of the group have a tour of the studio. They meet many mystical creatures including the bronze giant, Talos. Shinobu san, the president's daughter and Secretary control the facilities and security by using a remote control. The atmosphere in the studio is tense as the company seem to have financial trouble. As the group is about to leave, the dome suddenly blacked out and a scream is heard. They rushed back and discover Hanyu Tadashi, the Studio Business Manager collapsed on the observation deck with an injury on his head.
938	12	"The Killer Fist of Talos (Part Two)"; Transliteration: "Kyojin Tarosu no Hissatsu Ken (Kōhen)" (Japanese: 巨人タロスの必殺拳 (後編))	Minoru Tozawa	Masaki Tsuji	April 27, 2019
Shinobu san notice Talos bronze paint next to Hanyu san's injury. Hanyu san was sent to the hospital. The group believe that the culprit is still lurking around however the security and police checked and didn't found any suspicious people. The security informed the police that the service entrance door was broken so the culprit must have enter through there. However, Genta noticed the door was broken and blocked it earlier. Conan begin to investigate the surrounding and using Professor Agasa, he solved the case.
939	13	"The Dangerous Fossil Finding Trip"; Transliteration: "Abunai Kaseki Saishū" (Japanese: 危ない化石採集)	Baron Horiuchi	Asami Ishikawa	May 4, 2019
Professor Agasa and the Detective Boys went to Oninohamura Village Lodge & Fossil Museum for some fossil digging. When Ayumi Chan and Haibara went to the washroom, they discovered the owner Ogami Akira being poisoned to death. The forensics discovered that the victim's sanitary wipes are slightly more acidic than normal. Using Professor Agasa's voice, Conan solved the case.
940	14	"The Missing Girlfriend"; Transliteration: "Sugata o Keshita Koibito" (Japanese: 姿を消した恋人)	Kōichirō Kuroda Minoru Tozawa	Tatsurō Inamoto	May 11, 2019
Naruse asks Kogoro to search for his girlfriend Kaho, who suddenly disappears. After this, Kaho's sneakers and ID card were found on the bridge. The police reason that she committed suicide. Shio, a college student in newspaper delivery film a long-haired woman jumping off a bridge. It is also revealed that Kaho came to the scene in a taxi driven by Maki. Conan searches for the point of contact between Kaho's suicide and the accident of a female college student who fell to her death from park stairs three months ago.
941	15	"Find Maria-chan! (Part One)"; Transliteration: "Maria-chan o Sagase! (Zenpen)" (Japanese: マリアちゃんをさがせ！（前編）)	Akira Yoshimura	N/A	June 1, 2019
Rumors run rampant on social media that Kudo Shinichi is still alive and had been involved in Kyoto 'tengu' case, resulting in reporters flocking to Kudo's house. Kuroda, Rumi and Kanenori discover the news as well. Rumi is seen having scars over her body and have access to the Black Organisation's victim list. She also asked Haibara if she know Shinichi. Meanwhile the Detective boys, at Kobayashi-sensei's request, visit their absent classmate Maria Chan's house. They discover her grandmother's treasure hunt and decide to follow the hints and arrows in order to find her.
942	16	"Find Maria-chan! (Part Two)"; Transliteration: "Maria-chan o Sagase! (Kōhen)" (Japanese: マリアちゃんをさがせ！（後編）)	Minoru Tozawa	N/A	June 8, 2019
Conan assists the Detective boys over the phone to complete the treasure hunt to find Maria chan. Meanwhile, Yusaku Kudo and Hattori Heiji deal with the rumors regarding Shinichi. Yusaku learns that the words "Rum" and "Asaca" should be formed into one word "Carasuma". He revealed that the boss named is Renya Karasuma, a multi millionaire who should have died long ago. Rum issues Tooru Amuro an order to collect info on Shinichi Kudo.
943	17	"Tokyo Barls Collection"; Transliteration: "Tōkyō Bāruzu Korekushon" (Japanese: 東京婆ールズコレクション)	Kōichirō Kuroda	Yoshio Urasawa	June 15, 2019
An invitation arrives from a female fan named Toyoko Tokushima. She invited Kogoro to her Monja restaurant in Tsukishima. After eating the Monja, Toyoko is almost choke to death by a cabbage core. She claimed that her childhood friends, Bufu'usu of Tsukishima, are trying to kill her. Kogoro and Conan investigate the culprits. Conan realised what is going on, tranquillised Kogoro and solve the case.
944	18	"The Cost of Likes (Part One)"; Transliteration: "Ii ne. No Daishō (Zenpen)" (Japanese: いいね。の代償（前編）)	Takanori Yano	Nobuo Ōgizawa	June 22, 2019
At Yotsubishi Bank, a bomb threat phone call was received and causes a mass panic. Genta, Kagura Sumito and Otsubo Kikuhide who were passing by the bank got caught up in the panic and get injured. The injured people will be receiving compensation for their collateral damage. Kagura's friends who were visiting him told the Detective Boys a similar accident happened to Kagura half a month ago. Conan think that Kagura is doing it on purpose to receive money and the Detective Boys decide to investigate on him.
945	19	"The Cost of Likes (Part Two)"; Transliteration: "Ii ne. No Daishō (Kōhen)" (Japanese: いいね。の代償（後編）)	Baron Horiuchi	Nobuo Ōgizawa	June 29, 2019
The next day however, Otsubo san is found dead at a park. The Detective Boys believed that his death is related to the bomb threat case and Kagura san, decide to investigate further. Conan figure out the culprit's ultimate goal and solve the case.
946	20	"The Cursed Tears of Borgia (Part One)"; Transliteration: "Noroi no Hōseki Borujia no Namida (Zenpen)" (Japanese: 呪いの宝石ボルジアの涙（前編）)	Akira Yoshimura	Masaki Tsuji	July 13, 2019
40 years ago, the old Yamato TV was filming a live drama when a ring known as Tears of Borgia went missing. The suspect was Saeki Yuri san whose skeleton is found in a dried up dam by Mizusawa san and Umeki san, two real estate company employee. Saeki Sumire, Yuri san's granddaughter, requested Kogoro for help to clear her grandmother's name. When visiting the demolishing site, Sumire san, Ran and Conan ran into Kanoya Tatsuma who was the cameraman in charge at that time. Through Kanoya san, they met old acquaintances of Yuri san and begin to learn more about the past. Meanwhile Kogoro visited the Nonogaki Real Estate to meet up with Mizusawa san but discovered the place burning in fire.
947	21	"The Cursed Tears of Borgia, Part Two!"; Transliteration: "Noroi no Hōseki Borujia no Namida (Kōhen)" (Japanese: 呪いの宝石ボルジアの涙（後編）)	Minoru Tozawa	Masaki Tsuji	July 20, 2019
Kogoro discover Mizusawa san collapsed in the fire but failed to save him. Kogoro is then sent to the hospital. By watching the 40 years old film using a kinescope and revisiting the dam, Conan is able to figure out the case. After gathering everyone, Conan tranquillised Kogoro and make use of Professor Agasa's voice to solve both the case of past and present.
948	22	"The Man Crushed by a Dinosaur"; Transliteration: "Kyōryū ni Tsubusareta Otoko" (Japanese: 恐竜につぶされた男)	Tokugane Tanizawa	Kōshirō Mikami	July 27, 2019
The Detective boys and Professor Agasa went to watch a dinosaur show at Beika Dinosaur Museum. During the show, Ayumi chan got scared and fell. Naito Tatsuki, the show host helped her up. After the show, the Detective boys is getting ready to leave when they heard a loud noise of something collapsing. They went to check and discovered the dinosaur bones has fallen and crashed the director, Shida Nobuhisa. Conan begin to investigate and using Professor Agasa's voice, he solved the case.
949	23	"The Radio Questions and Concerns Show (Challenge Arc)"; Transliteration: "Rajio o Nayami Sōdan (Chōsen-hen)" (Japanese: ラジオお悩み相談（挑戦編）)	Takanori Yano	Nobuo Ōgizawa	August 3, 2019
Kogoro is invited to Nichiuri TV's Radio Show. He meet the producer Manda Teruomi, the director Kujirai Mamoru, the writer Yashiro Kaede and Nichiuri TV presenter Inuyama Ninosuke for the show. The radio show receive a letter from TM san who complain about her neighbour living above her. Several hours later, Kijima Kumi who heard the radio show argue with Manda Towako. The next day, Manda Towako is found murdered. The police discovered that Manda Towako san is the wife of the producer Manda. With Kijima san's alibi being proven, the police suspect Manda as the killer and took him away. However, Conan suspected Kujirai san and Inuyama san as they both have strong hatred toward Manda san.
950	24	"The Radio Questions and Concerns Show (Solution Arc)"; Transliteration: "Rajio o Nayami Sōdan (Nazo Toki-hen)" (Japanese: ラジオお悩み相談（謎解き編）)	Kōichirō Kuroda	Nobuo Ōgizawa	August 10, 2019
Conan begin to investigate the case and realised it is linked to an old drama from seven years ago. He read the script and listen to the recording to discover that both of them are on a completely different level, the script is well written while the recording is worse than a school's play. Conan called everyone back, tranquillised Kogoro and solve the case.
951	25	"The Whistling Bookstore 2"; Transliteration: "Kiteki no Kikoeru Kosho-ten Tsū" (Japanese: 汽笛の聞こえる古書店2)	Masahiro Takada	Yūki Nōtsuka	August 17, 2019
The Detective Boys are helping the cafe's owner Tamaki Yujiro out by transporting books. He previously appeared in a case on episode 868. Yujiro san arrived at Mizutani's house to purchase old books from her. However Yujiro san is unable to buy them as Mizutani didn't get her husband's permission to sell his books. Ayumi discovered a sliverfish inside the book so Yujiro san placed a lavender scented paper to repel away the silverfish. Later on, Sawada Ryosuke arrived at the cafe and show an image to Yujiro san to get his books appraised. The next day, Mizutani san's rare books got stolen and she believed that Yujiro san is the one who stole it. Later that evening, Sawada Ryosuke bought the books for appraisal and Yujiro san discovered the lavender scented paper he placed in Mizutani san's books the previous day. He realised Sawada is the thief and wanted to call the police. Sawada pushed him away and escape. Later that night, Sawada is found murdered at the park and Yujiro san is the prime suspect. Using Professor Agasa's voice, Conan cleared Yujiro san's name and found the true culprit.
952	26	"The Unsolved Cocktail Case (Part One)"; Transliteration: "Meikyū Kakuteru (Zenpen)" (Japanese: 迷宮カクテル（前編）)	Minoru Tozawa	N/A	August 31, 2019
Amuro sneaked into the Kudo's house to investigate on Kudo Shinichi. However he discover Akai Shuichi waiting for him and the two of them faced each other at gunpoint. Nine hours earlier, Amuro went to Mori Agency with some sandwiches to ask Ran about Kudo Shinichi. Unfortunately, Ran told him that their teacher forbid them to talk about Shinichi. He deliberately leave his phone inside and let Ran help him retrieve it so that he can take a look at Ran's wallet and keys. The group arrived at Black Rabbit Restaurant to meet with Morooka Gunzo, a wealthy man who received a threatening letter. They meet Asakura Yuri, a bunny girl working there. Morooka san accidentally stepped on his butler, Fukamachi Atsufumi san's glasses and offered to take his spare ones from the car. Meanwhile, Fukamachi san accidentally sounded his phone alarm and the bunny girls mistakenly thought it was an earthquake alert and started checking their phone. Yuri san accidentally bumped into her colleague Murakami Sana san and stained her cuffs. Yuri san joined the group at the dining table, however she collapsed soon after. Ran called the police and realised her wallet is missing. Murakami san returned it to her and told her that it was Amuro san who found it. Police arrived and they found arsenic in Yuri san's drink. She is sent to the hospital for treatment. Conan and Amuro begin to investigate the case.
953	27	"The Unsolved Cocktail Case (Part Two)"; Transliteration: "Meikyū Kakuteru (Chūhen)" (Japanese: 迷宮カクテル（中編）)	Yōhei Shindō	N/A	September 7, 2019
Police begin to question the people at the restaurant. Fukamachi san told the police that his master Morooka san patronise the clothing store next door and they only came here to pass time while his suits are being tailored. Conan and Amuro went to the parking lot outside and asked Morooka san's bodyguard if they noticed anything unusual. They denied it but claimed that Morooka san's weight has been strange recently. He would lose a bunch of weight and then gain it back. He also frequently tripped and get injured. Amuro suddenly recalled a blonde haired female doctor from his memory. Through the other bunny girls' testimony, the police learned that Fukamachi san came to the restaurant alone and attempt to bribe Yuri san with money. However she rejected his offer. The police also discovered Morooka san eloped when he was young and lived in Tottori for four years. Amuro received another text from Rum, asking him to hurry up and gather information on Kudo Shinichi. Amuro recalled visiting the Miyano Clinic when he was young. Miyano Elena, Shiho's (Haibara) mother was revealed to be a half foreigner like Amuro. She and Miyano Akemi helped Amuro to treat his wound. Miyano Atsushi, Elena's husband was given an offer to transfer to a facility to back up his research however he was thinking of rejecting them. He didn't want to leave his family behind and Elena's older sister Mary was a little suspicious of the organisation. It is revealed that the Karasuma Group is sponsoring the facility but Atsushi had heard unfavourable rumours about them. Elena is supportive of her husband and told him not to give up on his dream. She plan to close the clinic to assist him. Elena is also revealed to be three months pregnant with Shiho (Haibara). Atsushi decided to reconsider the offer.
954	28	"The Unsolved Cocktail Case (Part Three)"; Transliteration: "Meikyū Kakuteru (Kōhen)" (Japanese: 迷宮カクテル（後編）)	Akira Yoshimura	N/A	September 14, 2019
Ran approached Detective Takagi and told him that she had discovered a fake nail. It has lilies design on it and the other bunny girls told Takagi that it is one of Yuri chan's fake nail and it was her trademark. Ran told Conan it has been an awful day since she stepped on Yuri san's fake nail and lost her wallet as well. With Kogoro's remarks, Conan and Amuro realised the trick the culprit used. Conan and Amuro worked together to reveal the culprit and the trick used. Amuro revealed to the group that Yuri san is Morooka san's daughter whom he had when he eloped. He also revealed the reason Morooka san's weight keep changing is to get his suit tailored and tripping frequently is to tear his suit so that he can buy new ones. He does all these so that he can have an excuse to see Yuri san. Amuro knew this as when he was young, he would get injured on purpose just to see Elena san. In the end, Yuri san woke up in the hospital. At night, Amuro sneak into the Kudo's house using the keys he duplicated from Ran's. Akai remove his Subaru's disguise and both of them held a gun against each other. Akai revealed to Amuro that he knew he would make a spare key and sneak in to investigate on Kudo Shinichi beforehand. The tension is high before the light is switch on and Kudo Yusaku and Yukiko appeared. They invite Amuro for a cup of tea.
955	29	"The Secret of the Insect Man"; Transliteration: "Konchū Ningen no Himitsu" (Japanese: 昆虫人間のヒミツ)	Mayo Nozaki	Yoshio Urasawa	September 28, 2019
Conan and the detective boys arrived at Kuronosu Station to visit the insect ranch. However, they discovered the place to be under construction and the villagers are looking for Princess Gaga's treasure. Conan discovered something odd about the late mayor's action and he decided to investigate.
956	30	"The Mystery-Solving Water Taxi (Part One)"; Transliteration: "Nazo Toki Suijō Basu (Zenpen)" (Japanese: 謎解き水上バス（前編）)	Kōichirō Kuroda	Nobuo Ōgizawa	October 12, 2019
The body of Eiji Kadowaki was found in Beika Park. Eiji was rumoured to have domestic violence on his mother as she frequently have new injuries. There is also a suspicious man, Takase who was asking around about the Kadowaki family. The police questioned both Yuichi, the victim's brother and Takase but both of them turned out to have an alibi. Later that night, a fire broke out in the Kadowaki's house and the mother Yasuko died. Conan begin to investigate.
957	31	"The Mystery-Solving Water Taxi (Part Two)"; Transliteration: "Nazo Toki Suijō Basu (Kōhen)" (Japanese: 謎解き水上バス（後編）)	Masahiro Takada	Nobuo Ōgizawa	October 19, 2019
Conan and Kogoro decide to investigate themselves. They checked the restaurant's CCTV again and realised there is another man who is a similar build as Takase. This proved that Takase's alibi is faked. Takase fled to take the water taxi with Conan and Kogoro joining him. However Kogoro did not have evidence to prove that Takase is the culprit. After talking with Takase, Conan realised his motive and solve the case.
958	32	"The Poodle and the Shotgun (Part One)"; Transliteration: "Pūdoru to Sandanjū (Zenpen)" (Japanese: プードルと散弾銃（前編）)	Minoru Tozawa	Toshimichi Ōkawa	November 9, 2019
Kogoro, Conan, and Ran are invited to the birthday party of Anna, the president of a dog food company, Happywow and come to the yacht harbor. Immediately after the party started, Anna was shot dead by a masked man with a shotgun. Inspector Megure begin to investigate and realised that all the suspects have motive to kill Anna. Her ex-boyfriend, Hyodo Makoto, being especially suspicious. However Hyodo admitted to robbing Anna's house at the time of the crime, hence he has an alibi. The police have to investigate further as there were no evidence. At the ending scene, Hyodo is seen looking for something under the yacht and was beaten to death by someone using the shotgun.
959	33	"The Poodle and the Shotgun (Part Two)"; Transliteration: "Pūdoru to Sandanjū (Kōhen)" (Japanese: プードルと散弾銃（後編）)	Yōhei Shindō	Toshimichi Ōkawa	November 16, 2019
The police found Hyodo's body and the culprit's clothes under the yacht. Sally Chan, Anna's dog found the decisive evidence pointed toward the culprit. Conan tranquilized Kogoro and solve the case.

== Home media release ==
Shogakukan (Japan, Region 2 DVD)
Volume	Episodes^{Jp.}	Release date	Ref.
Volume 1	461, 466–468	January 25, 2008	
Volume 2	469–471, 474	February 22, 2008	
Volume 3	472–473, 475, 478	March 28, 2008	
Volume 4	476–477, 480, 483	April 25, 2008	
Volume 5	479	May 23, 2008	
Volume 6	481–482, 484–485	June 27, 2008	
Volume 7	487–488	July 25, 2008	
Volume 8	489–490	August 22, 2008	
