= Unconditional Love (Mai Kuraki album) =

- Standard edition cover

Studio album by Mai Kuraki
- Released: October 27, 2021
- Recorded: 2019–2021
- Studio: Northern Music
- Genre: J-pop; R&B
- Label: Northern Music
- Producer: Mai Kuraki; Daiko Nagato

Mai Kuraki chronology
Mai Kuraki Single Collection: Chance for You (2019)	Unconditional Love (2021)	Forever for You (2024)

Singles from Unconditional Love
- 1. "Zero kara Hajimete" Released: June 2, 2021

Unconditional Love (styled as unconditional L♡VE) is the thirteenth studio album by Japanese singer and songwriter Mai Kuraki.

== Release ==
The album was released on October 27, 2021, by Northern Music. It is the follow-up to her 2018 album Let's Goal!: Barairo no Jinsei. The album was released in four versions: standard edition, fan club edition, and two limited editions.

== Singles ==
"Zero kara Hajimete" was released as the lead single from the album on March 6, 2021. The single was re-released as a video single on June 2, 2021. The video single debuted atop on the Oricon Weekly DVD chart and has sold 8,419 copies nationwide. "Can You Feel My Heart" and "Hitori ja Nai" were released as the follow-ups to the single in April and August 2021, respectively.

== Track listing ==
No.	Title	Writer(s)	Length
1.	"Unconditional Love"	Mai Kuraki; Erik Lidbom	3:51
2.	"Unbreakable"	Kuraki; Takashi Fukuda; Mayu Wakisaka	3:03
3.	"One Love"	Kuraki; Shinichiro Murayama; Wakisaka	3:36
4.	"Can You Feel My Heart"	Kuraki; Daisuke Nakamura	3:56
5.	"W de Tsutsumuyo" (Wで包むよ)	Kuraki; Akihito Tokunaga	3:43
6.	"Veronica" (ベロニカ)	Kuraki; Nakamura	4:37
7.	"Tomorrow"	Kuraki; Satoshi Ikezawa	5:41
8.	"Hitori ja Nai" (ひとりじゃない)	Kuraki; Makoto Watanabe	5:09
9.	"It's Never Over"	Kuraki; Seiji Motoyama; Cybersound	3:29
10.	"Proof of Being Alive"	Kuraki; Kujira Yumemi	4:56
11.	"Sea Wind"	Kuraki; Takao Kisugi; Chokkaku	5:26
12.	"Zero kara Hajimete" (ZEROからハジメテ)	Mai Kuraki; Lidbom; Jon Hällgren; Youth Case	3:18

Standard edition bonus track
No.	Title	Writer(s)	Length
13.	"Always" (All Fan's Chorus Special Edit Itsudemo Love Zutto Smile)	Kuraki; Aika Ohno

Limited edition A bonus DVD
No.	Title	Writer(s)	Length
1.	"Can You Feel My Heart" (Ballad ver.（Mai Kuraki x Piano Premium Movie）)	Kuraki; Nakamura

Limited edition B bonus DVD
No.	Title	Writer(s)	Length
1.	"Togetsukyo (Kimi Omou)" (Live Movie from Billboard Classics 20th Anniversary Mai Kuraki Premium Symphonic Concert 2019)	Kuraki; Tokunaga
2.	"Light Up My Life" (Live Movie from Billboard Classics 20th Anniversary Mai Kuraki Premium Symphonic Concert 2019)	Kuraki; Tokunaga
3.	"Kimi to Koi no Mama de Owarenai Itsumo Yume no Mama ja Irarenai" (Live Movie from Billboard Classics 20th Anniversary Mai Kuraki Premium Symphonic Concert 2019)	Kuraki; Tokunaga
4.	"Be Proud (We Make New History)" (Live Movie from Billboard Classics 20th Anniversary Mai Kuraki Premium Symphonic Concert 2019)	Kuraki; Tokunaga
5.	"Barairo no Jinsei" (Live Movie from Billboard Classics 20th Anniversary Mai Kuraki Premium Symphonic Concert 2019)	Kuraki; Tokunaga

== Charts ==
=== Daily charts ===
Chart (2021)	Peak position
Japanese Albums (Oricon)	4

=== Weekly charts ===
Chart (2021)	Peak position
Japanese Albums (Oricon)	4

== Release history ==
Region	Date	Format	Catalogue no.	Label	Ref.
Japan	October 27, 2021	CD (Standard edition)	VNCM-9065	Northern Music	
Japan	October 27, 2021	CD+DVD(Limited edition A)	VNCM-9063	Northern Music	
Japan	October 27, 2021	CD+DVD(Limited edition B)	VNCM-9046	Northern Music	
Japan	October 27, 2021	CD (Musing & FC edition)	VNCF-9011	Northern Music	
Japan	October 27, 2021	Digital download		Being Inc.	
