= Hitori ja Nai =

Hitori ja Nai may refer to:

- Hitori ja Nai (Deen song)
- Hitori ja Nai (Mai Kuraki song)
