= Zero kara Hajimete =

2021 single by Mai Kuraki

Single by Mai Kuraki

from the album Unconditional Love
- Released: March 6, 2021
- Genre: J-pop
- Length: 3:45
- Label: Northern Music
- Songwriter(s): Mai Kuraki; Erik Lidbom; Jon Hällgren; Youth Case
- Producer(s): Mai Kuraki

Mai Kuraki singles chronology
"Kimi to Koi no Mama de Owarenai Itsumo Yume no Mama ja Irarenai" / "Barairo no Jinsei" (2019)	"Zero kara Hajimete" (2021)

Music video
- "Zero kara Hajimete" on YouTube

"Zero kara Hajimete" (Japanese: ZEROからハジメテ; "Start from Zero") is a song recorded by Japanese singer songwriter Mai Kuraki. It was written by Kuraki, Erik Lidbom, Jon Hällgren, and Youth Case, while the production was taken by Kuraki herself. It was released as the lead single from her thirteenth studio album Unconditional Love, through Northern Music for digital download and streaming on 6 March 2021. The song served as the opening song to the Japanese animated television series Case Closed from its 1000th episode which was broadcast on 6 March 2021. "Zero kara Hajimete" was released as a video single on 2 June 2021.

== Background ==
On 14 August 2019, Kuraki released her twelfth studio album Let's Goal!: Barairo no Jinsei, which achieved commercial success, peaking at number three in Japan. However, she had not released any new materials for long aside the compilation album Mai Kuraki Single Collection: Chance for You (2019). On 22 November 2020, Kuraki announced that she was working on a new music, and the production was being delayed due to the impact of COVID-19 pandemic. On 3 February 2021, it was revealed that Kuraki would release her first single in one year and 11 months, "Zero kara Hajimete". She singer announced that the song was written in celebration of the 1000th broadcast of the anime series with which she had been long collaborated, Case Closed. The song would serve as the opening song to the anime series from its 1000th episode, which would be aired on 6 March 2021. The remake of the anime's eleventh episode, "The Moonlight Sonata Murder Case (Part 1)" is set to be rebroadcast as its 1000th episode, since it was chosen as the most popular episode by the poll. "Zero kara Hajimete" is Kuraki's 24th collaboration with Case Closed, following "Kimi to Koi no Mama de Owarenai Itsumo Yume no Mama ja Irarenai"/"Barairo no Jinsei" (2019).

== Live performances ==
Kuraki performed the song as part of a guest appearance during the Case Closed Concert 2020–2021, which was co-headlined by All at Once and Airi Miyakawa at the NTK Hall in Nagoya, Aichi on March 28, 2021. The performance was accompanied by the orchestra which was conducted by Ikurō Fujiwara and directed by Yūichirō Ohnuki. Kuraki later visited Festival Hall in Osaka and Tokyo International Forum in Tokyo during the tour. On May 21, 2021, Kuraki provided the first television performance of "Zero kara Hajimete" on Buzz Rhythm 02.

== Track listing ==
Digital download
No.	Title	Writer(s)	Arranger(s)	Length
1.	"Zero kara Hajimete"	Mai Kuraki; Erik Lidbom; Jon Hällgren; Youth Case	Jon Hällgren	3:45
Total length:				3:45

== Video single ==
"Zero kara Hajimete"
- Standard edition cover

Single by Mai Kuraki

from the album Unconditional Love
- Released: June 2, 2021
- Genre: J-pop
- Length: 3:45 (YouTube ver. shortened to 1:16)
- Label: Northern Music
- Songwriter(s): Mai Kuraki; Erik Lidbom; Jon Hällgren; Youth Case
- Producer(s): Mai Kuraki

Mai Kuraki singles chronology
"Kimi to Koi no Mama de Owarenai Itsumo Yume no Mama ja Irarenai" / "Barairo no Jinsei" (2019)	"Zero kara Hajimete" (2021)

On 19 March 2021, Kuraki announced that the song would be released as a video single on 2 June 2021. The single was released for three editions, standard edition, Case Closed edition, and fan club edition.

=== Commercial performance ===
"Zero kara Hajimete" debuted at number one on the Oricon weekly DVD chart, making it Kuraki's first number one entry on the chart since Mai Kuraki Clip & Live Selection“My Reflection” topped on the chart in January 2004.

=== Music video ===
On April 23, 2021, Kuraki teased the music video with a 27-second teaser on YouTube. The short version of the music video was premiered on the platform on April 28, 2021. The full version of the music video was not released on YouTube; it is included only in the Video Single.

=== Track listing ===
Video single (standard edition)
No.	Title	Writer(s)	Arranger(s)	Length
1.	"Zero kara Hajimete" (Music video)	Mai Kuraki; Erik Lidbom; Jon Hällgren; Youth Case	Jon Hällgren
2.	"Secret of My Heart" (Mai Kuraki x Piano Premium Live)	Kuraki; Aika Ohno

Standard/FC & Musing edition bonus CD
No.	Title	Writer(s)	Arranger(s)	Length
1.	"Zero kara Hajimete"	Mai Kuraki; Erik Lidbom; Jon Hällgren; Youth Case	Jon Hällgren
2.	"Zero kara Hajimete" (Instrumental)	Kuraki; Lidbom; Jon; Youth Case	Hällgren

Video single (Detective Conan edition)
No.	Title	Writer(s)	Arranger(s)	Length
1.	"Zero kara Hajimete" (Music video)	Mai Kuraki; Erik Lidbom; Jon Hällgren; Youth Case	Jon Hällgren
2.	"Zero kara Hajimete" (Detective Conan Opening Movie)	Kuraki; Lidbom; Hällgren; Youth Case	Hällgren

Detective Conan edition bonus CD
No.	Title	Writer(s)	Arranger(s)	Length
1.	"Zero kara Hajimete"	Mai Kuraki; Erik Lidbom; Jon Hällgren; Youth Case	Jon Hällgren
2.	"Zero kara Hajimete" (TV version)	Kuraki; Lidbom; Jon; Youth Case	Hällgren

Video single (FC & Musing edition)
No.	Title	Writer(s)	Arranger(s)	Length
1.	"Zero kara Hajimete" (Music video)	Mai Kuraki; Erik Lidbom; Jon Hällgren; Youth Case	Jon Hällgren

== Charts ==
=== Daily charts ===
Chart (2021)	Peak position
Japan DVD (Oricon)	1
Japan Music DVD (Oricon)	1

=== Weekly charts ===
Chart (2021)	Peak position
Japan DVD (Oricon)	1
Japan Music DVD (Oricon)	1
Japan Download (Japan Top Download Songs)	80
Japan RecoChoku (RecoChoku Weekly Singles)	35
Japan mora (mora Weekly Singles)	27
Japan music.jp (music.jp Weekly Singles)	33
Japan music.jp (Dwango Weekly Singles)	36

== Release history ==
Region	Date	Format	Label	Ref.
Japan	March 6, 2021	Digital download; streaming	Northern Music	
Japan	June 2, 2021	DVD+CD (Standard edition)	Northern Music	
Japan	June 2, 2021	DVD+CD (Detective Conan edition)	Northern Music	
Japan	June 2, 2021	DVD+CD+Merchandise (Fan club & Musing edition)	Northern Music	
