= Secret, Voice of My Heart =

2022 single by Mai Kuraki

Promotional single by Mai Kuraki

from the album Forever for You
- Released: October 4, 2022
- Genre: J-pop
- Length: 4:34
- Label: Northern Music
- Songwriter(s): Mai Kuraki; Koshiro Honda
- Producer(s): Mai Kuraki; Akihito Tokunaga

Mai Kuraki promotional singles chronology
"Veronica" (2021)	"Secret, Voice of My Heart" (2022)

"Secret, Voice of My Heart" (stylized as "Secret, voice of my heart") is a song recorded by Japanese singer songwriter Mai Kuraki. It was released as the first promotional single from her extended play, Forever for You (2024), through Northern Music for digital download on 4 October 2022. The song served as the ending theme song to the Japanese comedy anime television series Detective Conan: The Culprit Hanzawa (2022).

== Music video ==
The official lyric video of "Secret, Voice of My Heart" was released on YouTube on February 14, 2023, in celebration of the international release of Detective Conan: The Culprit Hanzawa on Netflix.

== Track listing ==
Digital download
No.	Title	Writer(s)	Arranger(s)	Length
1.	"Secret, Voice of My Heart"	Mai Kuraki; Koshiro Honda	Akihito Tokunaga	4:34

== Charts ==
=== Weekly charts ===
Chart (2022)	Peak position
Japan Download Songs (Oricon)	17
Japan Download Songs (Billboard Japan)	32

== Release history ==
Region	Date	Format	Label	Ref.
Japan	October 4, 2022	Digital download	Northern Music	
