= Case Closed: The Culprit Hanzawa =

Japanese manga series by Mayuko Kanba

- Cover of the first volume, featuring Makoto Hanzawa

名探偵コナン 犯人の犯沢さん (Meitantei Konan Hannin no Hanzawa-san)
- Genre: Gag comedy
- Created by: Gosho Aoyama
- Manga
- Written by: Mayuko Kanba
- Published by: Shogakukan
- Imprint: Shōnen Sunday Comics
- Magazine: Shōnen Sunday S
- Original run: May 25, 2017 – present
- Volumes: 10
- Anime television series
- Directed by: Akitaro Daichi
- Music by: Jun Abe; Seiji Muto
- Studio: TMS Entertainment
- Licensed by: Netflix (streaming rights)
- Original network: Tokyo MX, ytv, BS Nippon
- Original run: October 4, 2022 – December 20, 2022
- Episodes: 12
- icon

Case Closed: The Culprit Hanzawa, also known as Detective Conan: The Culprit Hanzawa (Japanese: 名探偵コナン 犯人の犯沢さん, Hepburn: Meitantei Konan Hannin no Hanzawa-san), is a Japanese manga series written and illustrated by Mayuko Kanba. It is a spin-off to the Case Closed manga series by Gosho Aoyama and stars the black-silhouetted "criminal" that appears in the main series to represent the mystery culprits. Kanba launched the manga in Shogakukan's Shōnen Sunday S in May 2017 and its chapters have been collected in ten tankōbon volumes as of April 2026. An anime television series adaptation produced by TMS Entertainment aired from October to December 2022.

== Premise ==
Set in the crime-ridden city of Beika, the series depicts the daily life and encounters of Makoto Hanzawa, a mysterious figure who has moved to Tokyo from the countryside, as well as the string of incidents that plague the city. Alongside Hanzawa, the series features major characters from the Case Closed series, including Conan Edogawa.

== Characters ==
Makoto Hanzawa (犯沢 真人, Hanzawa Makoto)
Voiced by: Shouta Aoi (Japanese); Max Mittelman (English)
Pometarō (ポメ太郎)
Voiced by: Inori Minase (Japanese); Courtney Lin (English)
Conan Edogawa (江戸川 コナン, Edogawa Konan)
Voiced by: Minami Takayama (Note: Information is taken from the PV.) (Japanese); Wendee Lee (English)
Ran Mōri (毛利 蘭, Mōri Ran)
Voiced by: Wakana Yamazaki (Japanese); Cristina Vee (English)
Kogorō Mōri (毛利 小五郎, Mōri Kogorō)
Voiced by: Rikiya Koyama (Japanese); Xander Mobus (English)
Ai Haibara (灰原 哀, Haibara Ai)
Voiced by: Megumi Hayashibara (Japanese); Erica Mendez (English)
Saguru Hakuba (白馬 探, Hakuba Saguru)
Voiced by: Akira Ishida (Japanese); Alejandro Saab (English)
Tsutomu Hanbayashi (犯林 つとむ, Hanbayashi Tsutomu)
Voiced by: Junya Enoki (Japanese); Ben Diskin (English)

== Media ==
=== Manga ===
Written and illustrated by Mayuko Kanba, Case Closed: The Culprit Hanzawa is a spin-off to the Case Closed manga series by Gosho Aoyama, and stars the black-silhouetted "criminal" that appears in the main series to represent the mystery culprits. The manga started in Shogakukan's Shōnen Sunday S on May 25, 2017. It is published intermittently in the magazine. Shogakukan has collected its chapters into individual tankōbon volumes. The first volume was released on December 18, 2017. As of April 8, 2026, ten volumes have been released.

==== Volumes ====
No.	Release date	ISBN
1	December 18, 2017	978-4-09-128027-5
2	April 11, 2018	978-4-09-128226-2
3	October 18, 2018	978-4-09-128564-5
4	April 10, 2019	978-4-09-129180-6
5	December 18, 2019	978-4-09-129450-0
6	October 18, 2021	978-4-09-850727-6
7	September 15, 2022	978-4-09-851256-0
8	October 18, 2023	978-4-09-852129-6
9	October 18, 2024	978-4-09-853655-9
10	April 8, 2026	978-4-09-854542-1

=== Anime ===
In October 2021, it was announced that the manga would receive an anime adaptation. In November 2021, at Netflix's "Festival Japan" virtual event, it was revealed that they would stream the series. It is produced by TMS Entertainment and directed by Akitaro Daichi, with character designs handled by Fū Chisaka, and music composed by Jun Abe and Seiji Muto. The series aired on Tokyo MX, ytv and BS Nippon from October 4 to December 20, 2022. (Note: Tokyo MX listed the air dates for the series on Monday at 25:05, which is effectively Tuesday at 1:05 a.m. JST.) The opening theme song is "Tsukamaete, Konya" by Leon Niihama, and the ending theme song is "Secret, Voice of My Heart" by Mai Kuraki. The series premiered outside of Japan on Netflix on February 1, 2023.

==== Episodes ====
No.	Title	Directed by (Note: Information is taken from the ending credits of each episode.)	Storyboarded by	Original release date	English release date
1	"The Culprit Is Here!"; Transliteration: "Yattekita Hannin" (Japanese: やって来た犯人)	Masako Sato	Akitarō Daichi	October 4, 2022	February 1, 2023
2	"Encounters Are Mysterious Things"; Transliteration: "Hito no Deai wa Ara Fushigi" (Japanese: ひとの出会いはアラふしぎ)	Masako Sato	Akitarō Daichi	October 11, 2022	February 1, 2023
3	"Death Trap"; Transliteration: "Arijigoku" (Japanese: 蟻地獄)	Akira Yoshimura	Akitarō Daichi	October 18, 2022	February 1, 2023
4	"The Jet-Black Shower Scene"; Transliteration: "Shikkoku no Shawā Shīn" (Japanese: 漆黒の入浴(シャワーシーン))	Akira Yoshimura	Akitarō Daichi	October 25, 2022	February 1, 2023
5	"Beika Town Rhapsody"; Transliteration: "Beika-chō Rapusodī" (Japanese: 米花町狂詩曲(ラプソディー))	Akira Yamada	Akitarō Daichi	November 1, 2022	February 1, 2023
6	"The Countdown to Getting Evicted"; Transliteration: "Taikyo e no Kauntodaun" (Japanese: 退去へのカウントダウン)	Akira Yamada	Akitarō Daichi	November 8, 2022	February 1, 2023
7	"The Part-Time Workers' Requiem"; Transliteration: "Baitā-tachi no Rekuiemu" (Japanese: 労働者(バイター)たちの鎮魂歌(レクイエム))	Makiko Hayase	Akitarō Daichi	November 15, 2022	February 1, 2023
8	"Next Conan's Hint: Hairball"; Transliteration: "Nekusuto Konanzu Hinto 'Kedama'" (Japanese: ネクストコナンズヒント「毛玉」)	Makiko Hayase	Akitarō Daichi	November 22, 2022	February 1, 2023
9	"Dress-Up Tonight"; Transliteration: "Kikazatte Tounaito" (Japanese: 着飾ってトゥナイト)	Hitomi Ezoe	Akitarō Daichi	November 29, 2022	February 1, 2023
10	"A Visitor From Another Dimension"; Transliteration: "Ijigen no Hōmon-sha" (Japanese: 異次元の訪問者)	Hitomi Ezoe	Akitarō Daichi	December 6, 2022	February 1, 2023
11	"Oh! Fortune"; Transliteration: "Ō! Mikuji" (Japanese: オー！ミクジ)	Masako Sato	Akitarō Daichi	December 13, 2022	February 1, 2023
12	"The First Target"; Transliteration: "Ichi Banme no Tāgetto" (Japanese: 1番目の標的(ターゲット))	Masako Sato	Akitarō Daichi	December 20, 2022	February 1, 2023

== Reception ==
The manga ranked fourteenth on the "Nationwide Bookstore Employees' Recommended Comics of 2018". By October 2018, the manga had over 1 million copies in circulation.
