= Forever for You =

- Standard edition cover

Studio album by Mai Kuraki
- Released: July 3, 2024
- Recorded: 2022–24
- Genre: Pop, R&B
- Length: 25:56
- Label: Northern Music
- Producer: Mai Kuraki; Daiko Nagato

Mai Kuraki chronology
Unconditional Love (2021)	Forever for You (2024)

Singles from Forever for You
- 1. "Secret, Voice of My Heart" Released: October 4, 2022; 2. "Unraveling love: Sukoshi no Yuuki" Released: October 28, 2023; 3. "You and I" Released: December 22, 2023

Forever for You is the second EP by the J-pop singer and songwriter Mai Kuraki. It was released on July 3, 2024, via Northern Music. The album marks Kuraki's first album in over three years and first EP in over 6 years.

The album was released in three versions: a standard edition and a limited, first press editions, which comes with BD.

== Promotion ==
=== Singles ===
"Secret, Voice of My Heart" was released as the first and lead single from the album on October 4, 2022. The song served as the ending theme song to the anime television series Detective Conan: The Culprit Hanzawa. On Valentine Day on 14th February 2023 a full version of the music videoclip has been uploaded on the official YouTube Channel. All the singles received only digital release. The single debut at Weekly Download Songs No.17 on Oricon and No.32 on Billboard Japan.

The second single Unraveling Love: Sukoshi no Yuki was released after the year gap. It served as an opening theme song to the anime television series Detective Conan. The single debut at Weekly Download Songs at No.37 on Oricon. The music videclip has been uploaded on the same day. The single cover includes picture of her dog, Benito.

The final single, "You & I" has been released two months later, on 22nd December 2023. The song served as an ending theme song to the anime television series Detective Conan.

=== Other songs ===
"Forever Home" was used as a commercial song for the condominium brand by Shin Showa Corporation. It broadcast on television for the first time in 25 December 2023.

"Thank you for every breath" has been used as a campaign song to the environmental project "Decarbonized Ekiden 365".

"Forever for you" is Kuraki's first English song to be written in over 20 years. The song served as a campaigning song to the Sunshine Aquarium event "Relaxing Night Aquarium". The song was written by long time collaborators, Michael Africk, Miguel Sa Pessoa and Perry Geyer (Cybersound).

=== Tours ===
In support of the album, Kuraki schedules to embark on the special acoustic live event Mai Kuraki Premium Request Live 2024 in Sunshine Relaxing Night Aquarium supported by U-Next performed at the Sunshine Aquarium. The live will be distributed through the live-streaming services U-next.

== Commercial performance ==
The album sold 11,528 copies in its first week and reached number three on the Oricon Weekly Albums chart and number four on the Billboard Japan Weekly Album charts.

== Track listing ==
Standard edition
No.	Title	Writer(s)	Length
1.	"Secret, the Voice of my heart"	Mai Kuraki; Koshiro Honda; Akihito Tokunaga	4:34
2.	"Unraveling Love: Sukoshi no Yuuki"	Kuraki; NoiR; Sadahiro Nakano; Yassun	3:53
3.	"You&I"	Kuraki; Seiji Motoyama; Chris Meyer; Daisuke Kawaguchi	3:32
4.	"Forever Home"	Kuraki; Ryosuke imai	4:36
5.	"Thank you for every breath"	Kuraki; SHUNCHA	4:18
6.	"Forever for You"	Kuraki; Michael Africk; Miguel Sa Pessoa; Perry Geyer	5:00

== Charts ==
Chart (2024)	Peak position
Japanese Albums (Oricon)	3
Japanese Albums (Billboard)	4

== Release history ==
Date	Format(s)	Label	Ref.
July 3, 2024	CD (Standard edition)	Northern Music	
July 3, 2024	CD/DVD (Limited edition: A)	Northern Music	
July 3, 2024	CD/DVD (Limited edition: B)	Northern Music	
July 3, 2024	CD/Acryl Stand (Detective Conan edition: A)	Northern Music	
July 3, 2024	CD/Acryl Stand (Detective Conan edition: B)	Northern Music	
July 3, 2024	2CD (Musing & FC edition)	Northern Music	
July 3, 2024	Digital download	Northern Music	
July 3, 2024	Streaming	Northern Music	
