= Can You Feel My Heart (Mai Kuraki song) =

2021 single by Mai Kuraki

Promotional single by Mai Kuraki

from the album Unconditional Love
- Released: April 21, 2021
- Genre: J-pop
- Length: 3:56
- Label: Northern Music
- Songwriter(s): Mai Kuraki; Daisuke Nakamura
- Producer(s): Mai Kuraki; Daiko Nagato

Mai Kuraki promotional singles chronology
"Koyoi wa Yume wo Misasete" (2018)	"Can You Feel My Heart" (2021)	"Hitori ja Nai" (2021)

"Can You Feel My Heart" (stylized as "Can you feel my heart") is a song recorded by Japanese singer songwriter Mai Kuraki. It was released as the first promotional single from her thirteenth studio album Unconditional Love, through Northern Music for digital download on 21 April 2021. The song served as the opening theme song to the Japanese comedy-drama television series Love Comedy no Okite (2021). It is the first time in the last ten years that Kuraki writes a song for a television drama series, since she wrote "Strong Heart" (2021) for Hunter (2011).

== Track listing ==
Digital download
No.	Title	Writer(s)	Length
1.	"Can You Feel My Heart"	Mai Kuraki; Daisuke Nakamura	3:56
2.	"Can You Feel My Heart" (Ballad version)	Kuraki; Nakamura	5:10

== Charts ==
=== Daily charts ===
Chart (2021)	Peak position
Japan Dwango Singles (Dwango)	19
Japan Mora Singles (Mora)	16
Japan RecoChoku Singles (Recochoku)	7
Japan Dwango Albums (Dwango)	5
Japan Mora Albums (Mora)	1
Japan RecoChoku Albums (Recochoku)	1

=== Weekly charts ===
Chart (2021)	Peak position
Japan Download Songs (Billboard Japan)	39

== Release history ==
Region	Date	Format	Label	Ref.
Japan	April 21, 2021	Digital download	Northern Music	
