= All at Once (duo) =

Japanese pop duo

all at once
- Origin: Japan
- Genres: J-pop; R&B
- Instrument: Vocals
- Years active: 2018–present
- Label: Being
- Members: Itsuki; Narito
- Website: aao.beinggiza.com

All at Once

YouTube information
- Channel: all at once official channel
- Years active: 2019-present
- Subscribers: 14.1 thousand
- Views: 8.47 million
- Last updated: January 15, 2024

all at once (オールアットワンス) are a J-pop duo formed in 2018. The duo was formed when its member, Itsuki, asked Narito to be his duo member when they had to perform at the event sponsored by the music school in Tokyo, where they both graduated. The duo was later discovered by the Japanese record label Being and made a contract with the company. In April 2020, they released the debut single "12cm", produced by Seiji Kameda.

Their debut extended play, Just Believe You (2020) reached number 20 on the Oricon Daily Albums chart. The extended play consists of the previously released singles: "12cm", "Hoshiai", and "Just Believe You". The latter two have served as the theme songs to the Japanese animated television series, Case Closed.

== History ==
In 2018, all at once was formed when Itsuki asked his classmate at the musical school, Narito, to be his musical partner. In 2019, they were discovered by a Japanese record label Being, and made a musical contract. In October 2019, they began posting music covers on Twitter. The cover of C&K song "Y" gained over one million views in less than two weeks. In November 2019, the duo served as an opening act for Mai Kuraki's 20th Anniversary Mai Kuraki Live Project 2019 "Let's Goal!: Barairo no Jinsei" ahead of the debut.

In April 2020, all at once released their debut single "12cm", produced by Seiji Kameda. The single was planned to be released both digitally and physically, however the release of CD single was cancelled as a result of COVID-19 pandemic. The B-side track of the single, "Take Mo' Chance" served as the theme song to the 2020 Japanese animated television series, A Destructive God Sits Next to Me. Their second single "Hoshiai" was released on 1 August 2020, and served as the theme song to the Japanese animated television series Case Closed. The song has been streamed more than two million times on the audio streaming platforms. The duo released their third single "Just Believe You" on 4 October 2020. The song was written by Mai Kuraki, Aika Ohno, and Giorgio Cancemi, and sampled Mai Kuraki song "Secret of My Heart" (2000). Their debut extended play Just Believe You was released on 27 January 2021. The physical version of extended play was released in two editions: standard edition and Case Closed edition. In January 2021, the duo announced that they would broadcast their first headlining concert, all at once Online Live ~Zero to One~ on 7 February 2021.

== Discography ==
=== Studio albums ===
List of studio albums, with selected chart positions and details
| Title | Album details | Peak chart positions | |
| Title | Album details | JPN Oricon | JPN Hot |
|---|---|---|---|
| All at Once | Released : October 6, 2021; Label: Being; Format: CD, digital download, streaming | 91 | — |
| The Greatest Day | Released : April 12, 2023; Label: B Zone; Format: CD, digital download, streaming | — | — |
"—" denotes a recording that did not chart.

=== Extended plays ===
List of studio albums, with selected chart positions and details
| Title | Album details | Peak chart positions | |
| Title | Album details | JPN Oricon | JPN Hot |
|---|---|---|---|
| Just Believe You | Released : January 27, 2021; Label: Being; Format: CD, digital download, streaming | 37 | 48 |
"—" denotes a recording that did not chart.

=== Singles ===
==== As lead artist ====
| Title | Year | Peak chart positions | | Album |
| Title | Year | JPN Oricon | JPN Hot | Album |
|---|---|---|---|---|
| "12cm" | 2020 | — | — | Just Believe You and All at Once |
| "Hoshiai" | 2020 | — | — | Just Believe You and All at Once |
| "Just Believe You" | 2020 | — | — | Just Believe You and All at Once |
| "Macaroon" (マカロン) | 2021 | — | — | All at Once |
| "Toshi wo Kasanete" (年をかさねて) | 2021 | — | — | All at Once |
| "Fanfare" | 2022 | — | — | The Greatest Day |
| "Aozora" | 2022 | — | — | The Greatest Day |
| "Rivals" | 2022 | — | — | The Greatest Day |
| "Playmaker" | 2022 | — | — | The Greatest Day |
| "The Greatest Day" | 2023 | — | — | The Greatest Day |
| "Yakō Kikyū" | 2023 | — | — | TBA |
| "Dolce" | 2024 | — | — | TBA |
| "Arch" | 2024 | — | — | TBA |
"—" denotes items which failed to chart.

=== Music videos ===
| Title | Year | Director(s) |
|---|---|---|
| "12cm" | 2020 | Takashi Koyama |
| "Hoshiai" | 2020 | Takatoshi Tsuchiya |
| "Just Believe You" | 2020 | —N/a |
| "Macaroon" | 2021 | —N/a |
