= Case Closed season 28 =

Season of television series

Case Closed
- Season 28
- The cover of the first DVD compilation for season twenty-eight of Detective Conan released by Shogakukan
- No. of episodes: 29

Release
- Original network: NNS (ytv)
- Original release: April 7 – December 22, 2018

Season chronology
- ← Previous; Season 27 Next → Season 29

The twenty-eighth season of the Case Closed anime was directed by Yasuichiro Yamamoto and produced by TMS Entertainment and Yomiuri Telecasting Corporation. The series is based on Gosho Aoyama's Case Closed manga series. In Japan, the series is titled Detective Conan (名探偵コナン, Meitantei Conan) but was changed due to legal issues with the title Detective Conan. The episodes' plot follows Conan Edogawa's daily adventures.

The episodes use six pieces of theme music: three openings and three endings. The first opening theme is Everything OK!! by Cellchrome used for episodes 898 – 902. The first ending theme is Kamikaze Express (神風エクスプレス, lit."The Divine Wind Express") by Takuto with Miyakawa-kun and starts at episode 898 and was used until episode 908. The second opening theme is Countdown by NormCore used for episodes 903 – 915. The second ending theme is Sadame by First place and starts at episode 909 and was used until episode 914. The third opening theme is Timeline by dps and starts at episode 916 and was used until episode 926. The third ending theme is Aozolighter by Cellchrome and starts at episode 915 and was used until episode 926.

The season initially ran from April 7, 2018, through December 22, 2018, on Nippon Television Network System in Japan. The season was later collected and released in eight DVD compilations by Shogakukan between February 28, 2020, and September 25, 2020, in Japan. Crunchyroll began simulcasting the series in October 2014, starting with episode 754.

== Episode list ==
No.	No. in season	Title	Directed by	Written by	Original air date
898	1	"The Melting Cake!"; Transliteration: "Kēki ga Toketa!" (Japanese: ケーキが溶けた！)	Koichiro Kuroda	Takeharu Sakurai	April 7, 2018
At Cafe Poirot, Kogoro, Ran and Conan arrived to have breakfast. They noticed a new cake fridge that the staffs just purchased a month ago. The episode mentioned Tokyo Summit and IOT appliances which is related to Movie 22, Zero the Enforcer. They discovered the cake being made has all melted and it is up to Conan to solve the mystery!
899	2	"The Real Culprit's Scream"; Transliteration: "Shinhannin no Sakebigoe" (Japanese: 真犯人の叫び声)	Takanori Yano	Yuko Okabe	April 28, 2018
Saeki Ayano went to visit her friend Mifuyu but heard the sound of glass breaking and screaming. After entering the apartment using the spare key, she found Mifuyu stabbed by her boyfriend Tabata Atsushi and he seem to have escape. Panicked, she left the apartment and meet Kogoro and Conan. They went back to the apartment but the body of Mifuyu went missing. The police arrived and begin investigating. They decided to go to Tabata's house and found him poisoned to dead as well. There is a suicide note beside him. Conan begin to investigate and solve the case.
900	3	"Solving Mysteries in a Locked Room"; Transliteration: "Misshitsu no Nazotoki Shou" (Japanese: 密室の謎解きショウ)	Minoru Tozawa	Nobuo Ogizawa	May 5, 2018
Kogoro, Conan and six people gathered around to find out who tried to kill a real estate company president, Azuma Toichiro. The previous day, Azuma san went to Mouri Detective Agency and told Kogoro that he has received a phone call threaten to kill him. Conan tranquilized Kogoro and begin to solve the case. He managed to find the culprit and he threatened to blow himself up with the dynamite tied to his body. Surprisingly, the whole case turned out to be a prank show. However, when the group wanted to go out for celebration, they find the door locked and the dynamite is unable to take off. Nichiuri TV's Tomurai-san reveal that the prank show was all a lie and she was not an employee of the TV station either. She swore revenge on Sleeping Kogoro as he send Utsubo to jail. Tomurai san aimed her gun at Kogoro. Conan appeared and defend him. As his shoes are sent for maintenance, Conan has no choice but to act pitifully in order to stall for time. Conan notices water leaks from the ceiling and gathers the water droplets into a bottle. Using the bottle, he managed to snatch away the detonator and gun from Tomurai san. The rest took this chance and pinned her down. The police arrived and took her away.
901	4	"Lawyer Kisaki's SOS (Part One)"; Transliteration: "Kisaki-bengoshi esu-ō-esu (Zenpen)" (Japanese: 妃弁護士SOS（前編）)	Nobuharu Kamanaka	N/A	May 12, 2018
Kogoro, Ran and Conan are heading to the cinema to watch Okino Yoko chan new mystery movie. However, Kogoro refused to go as he dislike the movie plot which is based on his character. Ran received a friend request from her mother on her messaging app but she is already friends with her. From the phone message, Kisaki Eri state that she has been captured by some bad people and needed Ran to call the police. Another Kisaki Eri popped up and say that it was just a joke. Kogoro, Ran and Conan realised there is two Eri, one being the impostor. The episode travels back to two hours earlier, at Kisaki's office where her assistant Kuriyama san got knock out by stun gun. Kisaki managed to subdue one man but got knocked out by another and ended up getting kidnapped. Kisaki managed to escape but unable to get out of the building. She stole one of her kidnapper's phone, went into hiding and send SOS message to Ran. As Kisaki is a lawyer, she use western commas in her documents instead of Japanese commas. Conan realised that and figure out which is the real Eri from the messaging conversation. Conan ask Eri to call them and tap the phone twice if she heard the church bell ringing. Through that, Conan being to deduct her location. Her kidnappers being to search for her and one of them is closing in on her hiding spot.
902	5	"Lawyer Kisaki's SOS (Part Two)"; Transliteration: "Kisaki-bengoshi esu-ō-esu (Kōhen)" (Japanese: 妃弁護士SOS（後編）)	Akira Yoshimura	N/A	May 19, 2018
Eri managed to evade her kidnappers and send a coded message to Ran. Conan figured out her location. Eri looked through the window and saw them downstairs. She shouted to them, but the kidnappers discover her. Kogoro rushed to save Eri while Ran faced off with the remaining two men and knocked them unconscious. Ran began to suspect Conan's deduction skills, but he managed to trick her by recording Shinichi's voice beforehand. In the end, Eri, Kogoro, Ran and Conan went to see Okino Yoko chan movie. However Eri complained about the movie and ended up quarrelling with Kogoro.
903	6	"Birds of a Feather at Loggerheads"; Transliteration: "Nitamono Dōshi ga Ken'en no Naka" (Japanese: 似た者同士が犬猿の仲)	Koichiro Kuroda	Junichi Miyashita	May 26, 2018
Hashizume Akira and Kagazume Hiroshi are both Nichiuri Sports Reporters who are similar in names, appearance and even lifestyle; however, they hated each other. When leaving, Hashizume purposely took the wrong tumblr, both Conan and Kagazume notice that. Kagazume ended up dead and Hashizume seemed to be the culprit. But Conan thinks there is something strange about this case. He tranquilized Kogoro and solved the case.
904	7	"Result of the Draw"; Transliteration: "Aiuchi no Hate" (Japanese: 相討ちの果て)	Hiroaki Takagi	Kenjin Sata	June 9, 2018
Detective boys and Professor Agasa were playing soccer. Genta went to retrieve the ball from a nearby house. From the outside of the house, Conan and Genta both saw someone stabbed in the chest. Upon entering the house, Conan discovered two people dead. It seemed like the two men got into a fight, with one stabbed the other and then fell against the arm rest. However, Conan thinks the case isn't as simple as it seems.
905	8	"Eyewitness Testimony Seven Years Later (Part One)"; Transliteration: "Nananen-go no Mokugeki Shōgen (Zenpen)" (Japanese: 七年後の目撃証言（前編）)	Takanori Yano	Chiko Uonji	June 23, 2018
7 years ago at Haido City, young Yuri Miona witnessed two men wearing Masked Comet Byun masks robbed and killed a company employee. Kogoro, Ran and Conan arrived at Nishiokuho Station to stay at a guest house called Hatobue Lodge. Apparently, Kogoro came for their wide variety of beers. At night, police arrived and informed the group that an unknown man was found drowned in the lake. Through the lodge's staff, they discover him to be Kitamoto Shujiro. He was also known as Kyujiro, one of the comedy duo together with Minakitaya Otaro, the prince of beer. As the police being to suspect Minakitaya Otaro to be the culprit, he was found killed in a locked room. Beside him, there is a symbol of Masked Comet which seem to be a dying message.
906	9	"Eyewitness Testimony Seven Years Later (Part Two)"; Transliteration: "Nananen-go no Mokugeki Shōgen (Kōhen)" (Japanese: 七年後の目撃証言（後編）)	Minoru Tozawa	Chiko Uonji	June 30, 2018
Police arrived to investigate the death of Minakitaya Otaro. They discovered his fingerprint matches one of the culprit's 7 years ago. As it traumatised her, Miona chan's memory of the event was hazy. Conan realised Otaro came to the guesthouse monthly because he was watching to see if Miona chan will regain her memory from 7 years ago. Conan begins to investigate and discovered the trick used in the locked room. He realised the culprit was the other robber from 7 years ago. Conan explains the dying message, found the true culprit and Miona chan finally regains her memory. In the end, Miona chan is finally able to smile happily again.
907	10	"The J League Bodyguard"; Transliteration: "Jei Rīgu no Yōjinbō" (Japanese: Jリーグの用心棒)	Hajime Kamegaki	Hajime Kamegaki	July 14, 2018
Mouri Kogoro has been given the honor of opening the Tokyo Spirits vs Gamba Osaka game. He brought the detective boys along with him. They were given a tour around the stadium and Ayumi wanted to give a drink to Hide san. However, giving of food and drinks before a match is not allowed. Ayumi then gives a sealed official sport drink to Hide san instead. Miyamoto Risa, the Tokyo Spirits Roupeiro then state that Hide san would have leftover drink for that night. Kogoro ended up drinking that bottle of drink and started having diarrhea. With the help of Jodie, Conan begin to investigate and manage to find the culprit. In the end, Conan helped the FBI to arrest all members of the totocalcio organisation within a day.
908	11	"Friendship Washed Away In The Riverbed"; Transliteration: "Kawadoko ni Nagareta Yūjō" (Japanese: 川床に流れた友情)	Nobuharu Kamanaka	Yasutoshi Murakawa	July 21, 2018
Kogoro, Ran and Conan went to a traditional ryokan to enjoy the day. They meet 3 college girls who came to take photograph. Conan notices the water mill isn't working and the staff say that it has been converted into an ice house. After taking some photos, the three girls left for various reasons. Ran and Conan were about to enjoy some shaved ice when they notice the river turning red. Akiba Yuko was found dead, floating in the river with red flowers on her. Conan reveals those flowers are a fern called Azolla Japonica that grows in lakes. From the victim's phone, the police believed that she could have accidentally fallen when trying to take a photo. However, Conan thinks that it is not an accident but murder. He begins to investigate and find the true culprit.
909	12	"Mystery of the Burning Tent (Part One)"; Transliteration: "Moeru Tento no Kai (Zenpen)" (Japanese: 燃えるテントの怪（前編）)	Akira Yoshimura	Umesaburo Sagawa	July 28, 2018
At the police headquarters, Kuroda is seen reading news about Haneda Koji and thinking about Wakasa Rumi. Inspector Shiratori arrived and told him that the Detective Boys, Conan and their grade school teacher, Wakasa Rumi are going to the newly opened campground. Kuroda seems shocked about this news. Inspector Shiratori advises Kuroda to take a break and go camping. He states that camping is not his style. At the campsite, Conan begins to suspect Wakasa Rumi as he found a receipt that showed she just bought 5 new plates and mugs that morning. This means that Wakasa sensei knew her neighbour would commit a murder and purposely damaged the screen so that she could use this as an excuse to invite the Detective Boys over to her apartment. (Ep 896-897) Conan also suspects Wakasa sensei found the skeleton in the basement beforehand as the rust on the trapdoor has been recently removed. (Ep 889-890) Conan and the others meet a group of university basketball team members. The atmosphere around them is tense and they got into a quarrel. Conan and Haibara realised Wakasa sensei tense up when they mentioned "lost of sight" "artificial eye". Conan also noticed Wakasa sensei grasped something from her back pocket. After the argument Urushibara Fumiaki, the basketball team's defense went to his own tent and rested. At night, everyone gathered to eat curry. Urushibara Fumiaki didn't come out and isn't responding when all three members separately went to his tent. Inside his tent, they saw his shadow doing squats. After dinner, the group notice Urushibara's tent was suddenly burning and helped extinguish the fire. Genta and Mitsuhiko think that the person in the tent next door could have seen something and the person is revealed to be Kuroda. Conan and Haibara realised Wakasa sensei's right eye is blind. Police arrived to investigate the scene and think it was an accident. However, Conan pointed out a few strange points and believes it was murder.
910	13	"Mystery of the Burning Tent (Part Two)"; Transliteration: "Moeru Tento no Kai (Kōhen)" (Japanese: 燃えるテントの怪（後編）)	Koichiro Kuroda	Umesaburo Sagawa	August 4, 2018
Police begin to question the three suspects. Wakasa Sensei used a balancing acorn as a hint to help Conan solve the trick behind the murder. Conan manages to find the culprit, but he grabbed Ayumi as a hostage. Ayumi fainted from the shock. Wakasa sensei begins to threaten the culprit and while he was distracted, Kuroda was able to arrest him. Since Wakasa sensei saved Ayumi, Haibara likes her and doesn't allow Conan to speak ill of her. Conan notices a shape from her back pocket and wonders what it is.
911	14	"The Job Request From Inspector Megure"; Transliteration: "Megure-keibu kara no Irai" (Japanese: 目暮警部からの依頼)	Hiroaki Takagi	Nobuo Ogizawa	September 1, 2018
Inspector Megure arrived at Mouri Detective Agency to request for Kogoro's help. Three weeks ago, Reigan Yutaka, a famous Japanese literature scholar was found stabbed to death in his home at Yotsubadai. The police caught the culprit, Maihama Ryuji. However, with just two days remaining on his detention period, Maihama Ryuji admits that he committed a burglary in Sasago-cho, hence he has an alibi. The police knew Maihama Ryuji was the culprit, but the two locations are separated by an hour's travel and they couldn't figure out the trick he used. Conan figures it out, tranquilized Kogoro and solves the case.
912	15	"The Detective Boys Become Models"; Transliteration: "Moderu ni Natta Tanteidan" (Japanese: モデルになった探偵団)	Takanori Yano	Toyoto Kogiso	September 8, 2018
Kogoro, Ran and Conan are having dinner at home when Detective Takagi called and informed them that Conan is a witness in a murder case. They went to the crime scene and learned that the victim is called Kitasono Seiho, a painter. Nishiyama Daiki, Kitasono Seiho's apprentice had prepared a painting of Conan and his friends at Lake Okuho that day, so the police contacted Conan to confirm the timing. The police begin to question the suspects. Detective Takagi and the Detective Boys went back to Lake Okuho to verify Nishiyama's alibi. After checking the environment and questioning the passers by, the Detective Boys and Detective Takagi are able to confirm his alibi fell apart and are able to arrest him.
913	16	"Conan Kidnapped (Part One)"; Transliteration: "Tsuresarareta Conan (Zenpen)" (Japanese: 連れ去られたコナン（前編）)	Minoru Tozawa	Junichi Miyashita	September 15, 2018
At a warehouse, the police confronted Takatori Iwao, a jewelry store robber. He and his accomplice Utsumi Tokuro robbed Beika City jewelry store and stole 300 million yen worth of jewels. After Conan tranquilized Kogoro and begins the deduction show, Takatori shoot the ceiling and boxes of crates fell. Conan collides with Takatori, losing his phone and detective badge and broke his watch. Takatori escape and kidnapped Conan. Conan escapes from the moving car and enters Kitahinode Shopping Center; however, all stores are closed down and there is no public phone. Conan ended up getting captured by Takatori again. Takatori switched cars and drove to an abandoned factory. He ordered Conan to climb inside the chimney. As the police begin to investigate the jewelry store's supplier and delivery company, Yamaga Setsuo the jewelry store buyer escapes as he was the one who leaked the information to the robbers. Inside the chimney, Conan found the corpse of Utsumi and a bag of jewels. Takatori revealed that Utsumi betrayed and tried to kill him. Utsumi then slipped and fell down the chimney, killing him. At the end, Takatori threw Conan out of the moving car and said farewell.
914	17	"Conan Kidnapped (Part Two)"; Transliteration: "Tsuresarareta Conan (Kōhen)" (Japanese: 連れ去られたコナン（後編）)	Nobuharu Kamanaka	Junichi Miyashita	September 22, 2018
After getting thrown out of the car, Conan woke up and found himself at a road intersection. Conan was sent to Beika Central Hospital and informed the police about what happened. Conan escaped from the hospital and began looking for Takatori. He went to Shingetsu Bar and found Utsumi's apartment. Inside, Conan discovers the body of Yamaga Setsuo. He discovers the culprit is planning to take a flight to Hong Kong at 4pm. Conan heard a sound from the balcony and went to check it out. Takatori managed to lock him outside of the balcony and left. Conan discovers the emergency staircase and used it to escape and chase after Takatori. At the road to the airport, Conan managed to stop Takatori and the culprit using his soccer ball. He tranquilized Kogoro and solved the case.
915	18	"High School Girl Detective Suzuki Sonoko"; Transliteration: "Jēkē Tantei Suzuki Sonoko" (Japanese: JK探偵鈴木園子)	Koichiro Kuroda	Masaki Tsuji	September 29, 2018
Conan, Ran and Sonoko went to the park for stargazing. Looking through the binoculars, Sonoko spotted a hand among the flowerbeds. They arrived at Sasaki Studio; however, there is no corpse at the flowerbed. The director informed them that there is another flowerbed on the roof of Yoshimura building. They went to check but were still unable to find the corpse. Sonoko realised they missed out searching for a spot and went back to Sasaki Studio. Conan also figured out the trick used and who the true culprit is. Conan and Ran rushed to save Sonoko who confronted the culprit. This is the first case Sonoko solved on her own.
916	19	"Kendo Tournament of Love and Mystery (Part One)"; Transliteration: "Koi to Suiri no Kendō Taikai (Zenpen)" (Japanese: 恋と推理の剣道大会（前編）)	Akira Yoshimura	Umesaburo Sagawa	October 6, 2018
Ran and Conan went to watch Hattori Heiji's Kendo Tournament. Hattori planned to defeat Okita Soshi and confess to Kazuha. Ooka Momiji is also on her way to watch Heiji's match. It is revealed Momiji and Okita are classmates. Meanwhile near a deserted toilet, Nikitani Shido, a Kendo Referee is slashed on his neck by an unknown killer who wore a kendo uniform. Conan and Ran who were searching for toilet discover Nikitani's corpse and call the police. A blind man happened to hear the commotion and through his statement, the police concluded the killer went inside the bathroom and did not managed to escape yet. Ran meets Okita Soshi and realised he looks really similar to Shinichi. The police also discovered the bloody Kendo uniform abandoned at the back of the toilet. Back at the tournament, Kazuha wonder where is Ran and the others, while Momiji arrived and enjoy her tea.
917	20	"Kendo Tournament of Love and Mystery (Part Two)"; Transliteration: "Koi to Suiri no Kendō Taikai (Kōhen)" (Japanese: 恋と推理の剣道大会（後編）)	Hiroaki Takagi	Umesaburo Sagawa	October 13, 2018
Heiji and Okita wanted to have a match before the tournament start, however Sato stopped them. Sato reassured Heiji that if he can solve the case before the match resumes, they wouldn't have to cancel the tournament. The police begin to check the three suspects' belongings. Heiji figures out who the culprit is and solved the case. Ran rushed to bring Heiji and Okita back to the tournament, however the matches are already over. Their opponents won by default. Momiji decided to meet Heiji under better circumstances and leave. Heiji failed to confess his love once again.
918	21	"The Mini Patrol Car Police's Big Chase"; Transliteration: "Minipato Porisu Daitsuiseki" (Japanese: ミニパトポリス大追跡)	Yoshihiro Sugai	Yuko Okabe	October 27, 2018
Miyamoto Yumi and Miike Naeko are driving around in their patrol car. Yumi wishes for a big case to happen like those in drama. They meet the Detective Boys who are chasing after Genta as he got kidnapped by two men. The Detective Boys got into the patrol car and chase after them. Through the detective badge, Conan overheard the kidnappers saying they would clean up on diamonds and the group assumed they were jewel thieves. Conan figures out where the kidnappers are headed and rescues Genta. It turns out the kidnappers are part of an organisation that smuggles protected whitebait eels to overseas illegally.
919	22	"The High School Girl Trio's Secret Café (Part One)"; Transliteration: "Jēkē Torio Himitsu no Kafe (Zenpen)" (Japanese: JKトリオ秘密のカフェ（前編）)	Minoru Tozawa	Yasuyuki Honda	November 3, 2018
Conan and Kogoro think that Ran is acting weird and overly excited lately and decided to follow her to figure out what she is up to. They followed her to Cafe Rice Flower and saw Sonoko and Sera meeting with her. Through their conversation, Kogoro and Conan realised the girls are planning to go to Kyoto on their break. Ran mentioned Okita and Conan gets jealous and worries if she would meet him in Kyoto. Sonoko spotted Conan and Kogoro. Just then, the waitress screamed and Saraie Daiki, the cafe's waiter is found murdered in the staffs' changing room. Police arrived and begin to investigate. After questioning, Sera seems to have figured out the case.
920	23	"The High School Girl Trio's Secret Café (Part Two)"; Transliteration: "Jēkē Torio Himitsu no Kafe (Kōhen)" (Japanese: JKトリオ秘密のカフェ（後編）)	Nobuharu Kamanaka	Yasuyuki Honda	November 10, 2018
Police continue to investigate. Sera figures out the trick used but has not figured out who the culprit is yet. Sera thought Conan hasn't figured out the case, but he informed her that he already figured out the culprit and trick used. What he couldn't figure out is why Ran said this trip is an unusual trip. Sera and Conan worked together to reveal the trick used and the culprit. At the end of the day, the girls informed the frustrated Conan that the trip is their high school trip, which Conan totally forgot. Conan really wanted to go on the school trip.
921	24	"The Murderous Carpool"; Transliteration: "Satsui no Ainori" (Japanese: 殺意のあいのり)	Koichiro Kuroda	Kenjin Sata	November 17, 2018
Conan, Ran and Kogoro were at the mountain when their car breaks down. A group of college lab research assistants and their professor offered to tow their car. Goto Shoji, the college professor was drunk and asleep in the car. The group stopped and went to a store to buy groceries. After reentering the car, they discovered the professor dead. The police arrived and think that the victim slid down his seat and his phone strap accidentally strangled him. However, Conan tranquilized Kogoro and proved that it is murder.
922	25	"The Disappeared Detective Boys"; Transliteration: "Kieta Shōnen Tantei-dan" (Japanese: 消えた少年探偵団)	Akira Yoshimura	Junichi Miyashita	November 24, 2018
The Detective Boys went to watch the filming of Kaimen Yaiba show and saw a suspicious man, Tatsumi Masaya. He together with the Detective Boys excluding Conan got kidnapped. The episode jumped to two hours prior, after the show ended, the Detective Boys walked down the street where they meet Nakama Toshie, an old lady whose ten thousand yen bill flew away. As the bill flew away, it got stained by Genta's dumplings. Genta, Mitsuhiko and Ayumi chase after the bill and they each found one. Conan and Haibara realised they are counterfeit bills as they all have the same serial numbers. The Detective Boys decide to stake out near the park while Conan informed the police. The old lady's bill ended up inside a vending machine and Bella Hikifune, a Mafia picked it up. The Detective Boys followed after her but ended up getting captured. They woke up and found themselves inside a ship container with boxes of counterfeit bills. They reached the harbour, and the Mafia proceed to sink them into the sea. Haibara ordered the Detective Boys to release the bills through the gaps of the container's door so that the bills can float in the sea and the police can rescue them. Haibara keeps the evidence which proved the Mafia guilty of her crime and she ended up getting arrested.
923	26	"A Day Without Conan"; Transliteration: "Conan no Inai Hi" (Japanese: コナンのいない日)	Hiroaki Takagi	Nobuo Ogizawa	December 1, 2018
At a construction site, the Detective Boys excluding Conan found a man dead. Kogoro got free hotel voucher and brought Conan along with him. Police arrived and Mitsuhiko informed Conan that the victim is a serial blackmailer called Unmo Sadakazu. As Conan is not around, the Detective Boys follow the police to check the suspects' alibis. Conan finally make it back and solved the case.
924	27	"The Sun Sets Over Tangerine Fields"; Transliteration: "Mikan-batake ni Hi wa Shizumu" (Japanese: みかん畑に陽は沈む)	Minoru Tozawa	Yuki Notsuka	December 8, 2018
Conan, Ran and Sonoko arrived at Terauchi Tangerine Farm to pick tangerines. After harvesting the tangerines, they used an agricultural monorail to transport them down the mountain. After meal when Terauchi Tetsuji, the field manager and owner of the farm wanted to show the trio more photo albums, they discovered he had a frozen shoulder. After viewing the sunset, Terauchi Tetsuji went up the mountain on the monorail to fetch them. He waved to them and then fell off from the monorail. Police arrived and determined it was an accident. Conan tranquilized Sonoko and proved that it was murder.
925	28	"The Heartfelt Strap (Part One)"; Transliteration: "Kokoro no Komotta Sutorappu (Zenpen)" (Japanese: 心のこもったストラップ（前編）)	Yoshihiro Yamaguchi	Yasuyuki Honda	December 15, 2018
As Conan and the Detective Boys are leaving a soccer game, Conan asks Haibara to give him some APTX 4869 antidote so he can go on the school trip, but she refuses because of how many times she's had to bail him out before when he's run into trouble. While on the train, the train makes a sudden stop making Haibara lose her phone strap and Genta drop his Detective Boys badge. Conan and the Detective Boys enlist Amuro to help them search for Haibara's strap. Mitsuhiko's phone accidentally started filming when the train stopped, and they are able to use the footage to see a father and son who had picked up the strap.
926	29	"The Heartfelt Strap (Part Two)"; Transliteration: "Kokoro no Komotta Sutorappu (Kōhen)" (Japanese: 心のこもったストラップ（後編）)	Nobuharu Kamanaka Yasuichiro Yamamoto	Yasuyuki Honda Yasuichiro Yamamoto	December 22, 2018
Conan, the Detective Boys, and Amuro continue to search for the phone strap. It starts to rain in the parking lot of the restaurant they were in, and Genta puts up his hood which makes his Detective Boys badge drop out of the hood. After they find the father and son from the train, someone runs out and steals the strap from them. Conan and the Detective Boys track him down and find out that the man stole it because he hid an engagement ring in it. Conan realizes Haibara's strap had also fallen into Genta's hood with his badge and must be in the restaurant parking lot. They find it under a car and return it to Haibara. However, the strap gets run over by a car and got damaged. Conan drew the left eye back with a magic marker. Haibara gets angry and still refused to give the antidote to Conan.

== Home media release ==
Shogakukan/Being (Japan, Region 2 DVD)
Volume	Episodes^{Jp.}	Release date	Ref.
Volume 1	898-900, 903	February 28, 2020	
Volume 2	901-902, 905-906	March 27, 2020	
Volume 3	904, 907-908, 911	April 24, 2020	
Volume 4	909-910, 913-914	May 29, 2020	
Volume 5	912, 915-917	June 26, 2020	
Volume 6	918-921	July 24, 2020	
Volume 7	922-924, 935	August 28, 2020	
Volume 8	925-926, 929-930	September 25, 2020	
