= List of Case Closed volumes (81–100) =

Cover of Case Closed volume 81

The Case Closed manga, known in Japan as Detective Conan (名探偵コナン, Meitantei Conan), is written by Gosho Aoyama and serialized in Shogakukan's shōnen manga magazine Weekly Shōnen Sunday since January 19, 1994. Since Case Closed's premiere, over 1,000 chapters have been released in Japan, making it the 25th longest running manga series. Several adaptations based on Case Closed have been made, including an anime series and animated films. A database consisting of all the cases from the manga was launched in 2007. Viz Media announced its licensing of the series on June 1, 2004, and following Funimation Entertainment's English localization, released the series under the name Case Closed with renamed characters. The series follows high school detective Jimmy Kudo who was transformed into a child after being forced to swallow a poison.

The tankōbon volumes 81–100 contain chapters 851–1069.

== Volumes ==
| No. | Title | Original release date | English release date |
|---|---|---|---|
| 81 | The Drinking Detective | November 18, 2013; 978-4-09-124499-4 | January 11, 2022; 978-1-9747-2116-0 |
851. "Jodie's Memories" (ジョディの追憶, Jodi no Tsuioku); 852. "Where Is Shuichi Akai?" (赤井秀一の消息, Akai Shūichi no Syōsoku); 853. "The Barroom Detective Takes a Case" (探偵はBARで事件に遭遇する, Tantei wa Bā de Jiken ni Sōgū Suru); 854. "The Barroom Detective Makes a Deduction" (探偵はBARで事件を推理する, Tantei wa Bā de Jiken o Suiri Suru); 855. "The Barroom Detective Solves the Case" (探偵はBARで事件を解決する, Tantei wa Bā de Jiken o Kaiketsu Suru); 856. "Infidelity Investigation" (浮気調査, Uwaki Chōsa); 857. "My Deduction" (ボクの推理, Boku no Suiri); 858. "My Deduction Is Off" (居心地悪い推理, Igokochi Warui Suiri); 859. "Jeet Kune Do vs. Karate" (截拳動vs.空手, Jeet Kune Dō vs. Karate); 860. "The Smell of Kerosene" (灯油の臭い, Tōyu no Nioi); 861. "Like Magic" (まるで魔法のように, Marude Mahō no Yō ni)
| 82 | The Purr-fect Crime | January 17, 2014; 978-4-09-124551-9 | April 12, 2022; 978-1-9747-2117-7 |
862. "Iron Wall" (鉄壁, Teppeki); 863. "Blackout" (暗転, Anten); 864. "Showdown" (雌雄, Shiyū); 865. "The Calico Captain" (三毛猫の大尉, Mikeneko no Tai); 866. "Hide Your Claws" (猫を被って, Neko o Kabutte); 867. "A Kid's Trick" (イタズラっ子, Itazurakko); 868. "Lucky Cat" (招き猫, Maneki Neko); 869. "Missing" (ないのよ..., Nai no yo...); 870. "A Wish Come True" (願いが叶った時に..., Negai ga Kanatta tokini...); 871. "Red Badge" (赤バッジ, Aka Bajji); 872. "The Red Lady" (赤女, Aka Onna)
| 83 | Red Death | April 18, 2014; 978-4-09-125028-5 | August 16, 2022; 978-1-9747-2909-8 |
873. "The Red Demon" (赤い悪魔, Akai Akuma); 874. "The Red Old Days" (赤き昔日, Akaki Sekijitsu); 875. "The Red Tragedy" (赤の悲劇, Aka no Higeki); 876. "The Romance Novelist" (恋愛小説家, Renai Shōsetsuka); 877. "The Girl Who Looks Like Sera" (世良に似た女の子, Sera ni Nita Onnanoko); 878. "The Telephone, the Sea, and I" (電話と海と私, Denwa to Umi to Watashi); 879. "The Detective's Mentor" (探偵の師匠, Tantei no Shishō); 880. "Ebisu Bridge" (エビス橋, Ebisu Hashi); 881. "Drug Trafficking" (麻薬取引現場, Mayaku Torihiki Genba); 882. "Pale Blue Memories" (水色の思い出, Mizuiro no Omoide); The Viz volume also includes a bonus chapter on the True Profiles of the Case Closed cast and interview with the creator
| 84 | A Shot of Bourbon | July 18, 2014; 978-4-09-124620-2 | October 11, 2022; 978-1-9747-2910-4 |
883. "A Sleuth in Scarlet" (緋色の探偵, Hiiro no Tantei); 884. "The Pink Reply" (ピンク色の回答, Pinkuiro no Kaitō); 885. "The Kite Competition" (凧揚げ大会, Takoage Taikai); 886. "Eavesdropper" (盗聴男, Tōchō Otoko); 887. "The Voice of the Demon" (悪魔の声, Akuma no Koe); 888. "An Awkward Tea Party" (ギスギスしたお茶会, Gisugisu Shita Osakai); 889. "Zero" (ゼロ); 890. "High-Speed Blood Spatter" (高速の飛沫血痕, Kōsoku no Himatsu Kekkon); 891. "The Last Piece" (最後のピース, Saigo no Piisu); 892. "My Japan" (僕の日本から..., Boku no Nippon kara...); 893. "A Prologue in Scarlet" (バーボンの追究、緋色の序章, Bābon no Tsuikyū, Hiiro no Joshō)
| 85 | Checkmate | December 18, 2014; 978-4-09-125376-7 | January 10, 2023; 978-1-9747-3267-8 |
894. "A Suspicion in Scarlet" (緋色の疑惑, Hiiro no Giwaku); 895. "An Interview in Scarlet" (緋色の尋問, Hiiro no Jinmon); 896. "A Return in Scarlet" (緋色の帰還, Hiiro no Kikan); 897. "The Truth in Scarlet" (緋色の真相, Hiiro no Shinsō); 898. "An Epilogue in Scarlet" (緋色のエピローグ, Hiiro no Epirōgu); 899. "Sealed Move" (封じ手, Fūjite); 900. "Check" (王手, Ōte); 901. "Illegal Move" (禁じ手, Kinjite); 902. "Brilliant Move" (妙手, Myōshu); 903. "The Body in the Pool" (プールに沈む死体, Pūru ni Shizumu Shitai); 904. "The Sunken Shards" (沈むガラスの破片, Shizumu Garasu no Hahen)
| 86 | Dark Rum | April 17, 2015; 978-4-09-125817-5 | April 11, 2023; 978-1-9747-3268-5 |
905. "The Truth Rises to the Surface" (浮かび上がる真実, Ukabi agaru shinjitsu); 906. "A Generous Aunt" (親切なおばちゃん, Shinsetsu na obachan); 907. "A Suspicious Witness" (不審な証言者たち, Fushin na Shōgen sha tachi); 908. "Betting With Your Life..." (命を賭して..., Inochi o Toshite…); 909. "Kamaitachi is Coming" (鎌鼬あらわる, Kamaitachi Arawaru); 910. "The Murderous Kamaitachi" (殺意の鎌鼬, Satsui no Kamaitachi); 911. "Kamaitachi's Route" (鎌鼬の進入経路, Kamaitachi no Shin'nyū Keiro); 912. "The Denouement of The Kamaitachi" (鎌鼬の幕切れ, Kamaitachi no Makugire); 913. "Woodpecker" (啄木鳥, Kitsutsuki); 914. "Footprints and the Woodpecker Association" (足跡と啄木鳥会, Ashiato to Kitsutsuki-kai); 915. "To Saijo Mountain...!" (妻女山へ...!, Saijosan e...!)
| 87 | Murder, She Blogged | August 18, 2015; 978-4-09-126209-7 | July 11, 2023; 978-1-9747-3743-7 |
916. "The Past Flows Like Running Water" (往く事は流れの如し, Yuku Koto wa Nagare no Gotoshi); 917. "Sound of the Horse Whips, Softly, Softly, Crossing the River at Night" (鞭声粛々夜河を渡る, Benseishukushuku Yoru Kawa o Wataru); 918. "Blog"; 919. "Photo"; 920. "Selfie"; 921. "Ran Girl (Part 1)" (蘭Girl (前編), Ran Gāru (Zenpen)); 922. "Ran Girl (Part 2)" (蘭Girl (後編), Ran Gāru (Kōhen)); 923. "Shinichi Boy (Part 1)" (新一Boy (前編), Shinichi Bōi (Zenpen)); 924. "Shinichi Boy (Part 2)" (新一Boy (後編), Shinichi Bōi (Kōhen)); 925. "Birth of a Big Couple?!" (ビッグカップル誕生！, Biggu Kappuru Tanjō!); 926. "The Staff's Alibis Are?" (スタッフのアリバイは?, Sutaffu no Aribai wa?)
| 88 | Battle of the Bands | December 18, 2015; 978-4-09-126540-1 | October 10, 2023; 978-1-9747-4057-4 |
927. "Illusion in the Back Room" (バックヤードの虚像, Bakkuyādo no Kyozō); 928. "Strange Clients in Restaurant of Ramen" (ラーメン屋の変な客, Rāmen-ya no Hen na Kyaku); 929. "The Culprit Wielding a Tube!?" (ホースを回す犯人!?, Hōsu o Mawasu Han'nin!?); 930. "Lots of Flavors Within" (使いすぎた調味料, Tsukai Sugita Chōmiryō); 931. "The Zombie Blade" (ゾンビブレイド, Zonbi Bureido); 932. "March of the Dead" (死霊の葬列, Shiryō no Sōretsu); 933. "Human-Eating Zombie" (人食いゾンビ, Hito-gui Zonbi); 934. "Dead Body's Traces" (死人の行方, Shibito no Yukue); 935. "Below the Candles" (灯台下暗し, Tōdai Moto Kurashi); 936. "Girls Band" (ガールズバンド, Gāruzu Bando); 937. "The Disappeared Clue" (消された手がかり, Kesareta Tegakari)
| 89 | Unidentified Forensic Objects | April 15, 2016; 978-4-09-127089-4 | January 9, 2024; 978-1-9747-4282-0 |
938. "The Crime in the Blind Spot" (死角での犯行, Shikaku de no Hankō); 939. "Lunch at the Department Store!" (デパートでランチ!, Depāto de Ranchi!); 940. "Taking apart the Testimony" (バラつく証言, Baratsuku Shōgen); 941. "The Truth of the Testimony" (証言の真相, Shōgen no Shinsō); 942. "Chiba's Difficult Case" (千葉の難事件, Chiba no Nanjiken); 943. "Unidentified Flying Object" (未確認飛行物体, Mikakunin Hikō Buttai); 944. "Solar Balloon" (ソーラーバルーン, Sōrā Barūn); 945. "The Spiteful Old Man" (意地悪なおじさん, Ijiwaru na Ojisan); 946. "The True Married Couple" (真の夫婦, Makoto no Meoto); 947. "Motto" (座右の銘, Zayū no Mei); 948. "The Clipped Scissors" (握られたハサミ, Nigirareta Hasami)
| 90 | Black Death | August 18, 2016; 978-4-09-127330-7 | April 9, 2024; 978-1-9747-4338-4 |
949. "Sweet Scent" (甘い匂い, Amai Nioi); 950. "The Clenched Letters" (切り取られた文字, Kiritorareta Moji); 951. "The Soul Detective" (霊魂探偵, Reikon Tantei); 952. "In the Suspicious Next Room" (怪しき隣室には, Ayashiki Rinshitsu ni wa); 953. "As If Connecting with a Demon in the Darkness" (暗がりに鬼を繫ぐが如く, Kuragari ni Oni o Tsunagu ga Gotoku); 954. "Sanction of the Betrayal" (裏切りの制裁, Uragiri no Seisai); 955. "Whereabouts of the Betrayal" (裏切りの行方, Uragiri no Yukue); 956. "Brunt of the Betrayal" (裏切りの矛先, Uragiri no Hokosaki); 957. "Truth of Betrayal" (裏切りの真相, Uragiri no shinsō); 958. "The Monster of Yadori Village" (宿里村の怪, Yado Satomura no kai); 959. "Night of the Screaming Nue" (鵺の鳴く夜, Nuenonakuyoru)
| 91 | Fly Me to the Moonstone | December 16, 2016; 978-4-09-127330-7 | July 9, 2024; 978-1-9747-4600-2 |
960. "The Nue's Scars" (鵺の爪跡, Nue no tsumeato); 961. "The Fanged Nue" (牙を剥いた鵺, Kiba o muita nue); 962. "The Sad Nue Legend" (悲しき鵺伝説, Kanashiki nue densetsu); 963. "Tree God" (木神, Konokami); 964. "Approach" (接近, Sekkin); 965. "The Diary" (日記, Nikki); 966. "Scytale Cipher" (スキュタレー暗号, Sukyutarē angō); 967. "Impossible to Decode!?" (解読不可能!?, Kaidoku fukanō!?); 968. "Wakasa-sensei's Secret" (若狭先生のヒミツ, Wakasa sensei no himitsu); 969. "Swimsuits at the Dressing Room" (試着室で水着, Shichakushitsu de mizugi); 970. "The Message Left by Fingers" (指で残した伝言, Yubi de nokoshita dengon)
| 92 | The Shivering Sands | April 12, 2017; 978-4-09-127553-0 | October 8, 2024; 978-1-9747-4896-9 |
971. "Another Customer" (もう1人のお客さん, Mō ichi nin no okyaku san); 972. "Encounter between the Ripples" (さざ波の邂逅, Sazanami no kaikō); 973. "Investigator with the Ripples" (さざ波の捜查官, Sazanami no sousakan); 974. "The Scorcerer of the Ripples" (さざ波の魔法使い, Sazanami no mahōtsukai); 975. "Edoite Detective!?" (江戸っ子探偵!?, Edo-kko tantei!?); 976. "Stolen Betting Ticket" (奪われた万馬券, Ubawareta manbaken); 977. "Edo-era Reasoning Show" (江戸前推理ショー, Edomae suiri shō); 978. "Wakasa sensei's home" (若狭先生の自宅, Wakasa sensei no jitaku); 979. "A woman with white hands" (白い手の女, Shiroi te no on'na); 980. "A pure white feeling" (真っ白な気持ち, Masshirona kimochi); 981. "Crawling time in Cafe Poirot" (喫茶ポアロで暇潰, Kissa Poaro de himatsubushi)
| 93 | The Secret Adversary | July 18, 2017; 978-4-09-127553-0 | January 14, 2025; 978-1-9747-5153-2 |
982. "The engagement from Cafe Poirot" (待ち合わせは喫茶ポアロで, Machiawase wa Kissa Poaro de); 983. "In solving the mystery at Cafe Poirot" (喫茶ポアロで謎解きを, Kissa Poaro de nazotoki o); 984. "Eri's multiplicity" (英理、増殖す, Eri, zōshoku su); 985. "Eri's mischieves" (英理、万事休す, Eri, banjikyūsu); 986. "Eri's SOS" (英理、SOS, Eri, SOS); 987. "Tip-off" (ティップオフ, Tippuofu); 988. "Violation" (ヴァイオレーション, Vu~aiorēshon); 989. "Buzzer-beater" (ブザービーター, Buzābītā); 990. "Today I Settle the Score" (今日こそ決着を, Kyō koso ketchaku o); 991. "Hands off!" (手ェ出さんとき, Te ~e-da-san to ki); 992. "Your Time Has Come" (ここで会うたが..., Koko de outa ga...)
| 94 | Sweet Mystery of Love | December 18, 2017; 978-4-09-127883-8 | April 8, 2025; 978-1-9747-5239-3 |
993. "Wait a moment" (ちょー待て, Cho ̄ mate); 994. "Ran's Trace..." (蘭の跡を..., Ran no ato o...); 995. "You Don't Know?" (わからないのか？, Wakaranai no ka?); 996. "The Truth about the Trip" (旅行の真相, Ryokō no shinsō); 997. "Haibara's Mood" (灰原の機嫌, Haibara no Kigen); 998. "Search for the Phone Strap!" (ストラップを探せ！, Sutorappu o sagase!); 999. "Not Just Any Charm!" (ただのじゃないもん！, Tada no janai mon!); 1000. "The Scarlet Ceiling" (鮮紅の天井, Senkō no tenjō); 1001. "The Crimson Demon" (紅蓮の魔物, Guren no mamono); 1002. "Auburn Inuyarai" (紅檜皮の犬矢来, Benihiwada no inu yarai); 1003. "Rosy Brown Traces" (紅鼠の痕跡, Beninezu no konseki)
| 95 | Kiss Me Redly | October 18, 2018; 978-4-09-128560-7 | July 8, 2025; 978-1-9747-5540-0 |
1004. "The Light Crimson Answer" (薄紅の回答, Usubeni no kaitō); 1005. "The Dark Crimson Omen" (濃紅の予兆, Koikurenai no yochō); 1006. "Stay Put!" (じっとしてなさい!, Jitto shite nasai!); 1007. "That's Just How Nervous I Am" (落ち着きのない, Ochitsuki no nai); 1008. "See? ♡" (ホラ♡, Hora ♡); 1009. "At Black Bunny's Club" (黒ウサギ亭にて, Kuro usagi-tei nite); 1010. "So this is Goodbye..." (バイバイだね, Baibaida ne); 1011. "Memories of that woman" (あの女性ひとの記憶, Ano josei hito no kioku); 1012. "You've Messed Up" (ぬかったな, Nukatta na); 1013. "Even Though We're The Same Age..." (同い年なのに…, Onaidoshinanoni…); 1014. "Attendance" (臨場, Rinjō)
| 96 | Yield to Murder | April 10, 2019; 978-4-09-129179-0 | October 14, 2025; 978-1-9747-5853-1 |
1015. "Policewomen serial murder case (女性警察官連続殺人事件, Josei keisatsukan renzoku satsujin jiken); 1016. "No Parking" Sign" (駐禁の標識, Chūkin no hyōshiki); 1017. "It's not "Mike", but..." (「ミケ」じゃなくて, Mike" janakute); 1018. "In Ice" (氷中, Hyōchū); 1019. "The Replacement" (入替, Irekae); 1020. "At the Mercy" (飜弄, Honrō); 1021. "The Article" (遺品, Ihin); 1022. "The Stand-in" (代役君, Daiyaku-kun); 1023. "The Strange Drug" (妙な薬, Myō-na Kusuri); 1024. "Sera's Questioning" (世良の追及, Sera no Tsuikyū); 1025. "The Grown Up Child" (大人びてる子, Otonabite'ru Ko)
| 97 | The Chef Who Came in from the Cold | December 18, 2019; 978-4-09-129449-4 | January 13, 2026; 978-1-9747-6184-5 |
1026. "Because It Means a Lot to Me…" (大切な物ですから…, Taisetsu-na Mono Desu Kara…); 1027. "The Eyes of a Detective" (探偵の目, Tantei no me); 1028. "Mountain Villa in the Snowy Mountains" (スノーウィーマウンテンズのマウンテンヴィラ, Sunōu~īmauntenzu no maunten'vu~ira); 1029. "Capable of Making Crying Children Sleep" (泣いている子供を眠らせることができる, Naite iru kodomo o nemuraseru koto ga dekiru); 1030. "Just Like You..." (あなたと同じように…, Anata to onajiyōni…); 1031. "A Dangerous Feeling" (危険な感情, Kiken'na kanjō); 1032. "Collecting edible wild plants" (山菜の採集, Sansai no saishū); 1033. "Good Luck Charm" (おまじない, Omajinai); 1034. "Since you're clumsy" (不器用なので, Bukiyōnanode); 1035. "The Carved Black Lacquer Trail" (刻まれたブラックラッカートレイル, Kizama reta burakkurakkātoreiru); 1036. "An adult-like child" (大人のような子供, Otona no yōna kodomo)
| 98 | The Fourth Man | April 15, 2020; 978-4-09-850059-8 | April 14, 2026; 978-1-9747-6252-1 |
1037. "The Stream of Time..." (時の流れ, Tokinonagare); 1038. "Reveal More Than Hide" (隠すより現る, Kakusu Yori Arawaru); 1039. "Momiji's Challenge" (もみじの挑戦, Momiji no chōsen); 1040. "From your Real Madrid Fanatic Mother" (フットボウル好きの母より, Futtobouru-suki no haha yori); 1041. "Brothers Reuniting after Thirty Years" (30年ぶりの兄弟, 0-Nen-buri no kyōdai); 1042. "The Jingisukan of Memories" (思い出のジンギスカン, Omoide no jingisukan); 1043. "The Meijin's Beard" (名人のあごひげ, Meijin no agohige); 1044. "The Meijin's Eyes" (名人の目, Meijin no me); 1045. "The Meijin's Hand" (名人の手, Meijin no te); 1046. "The Meijin's Winning Hand" (名人の勝ち手, Meijin no kachi-te); 1047. "He has it with him..." (彼は彼と一緒に..., Kare wa kare to issho ni...)
| 99 | Fowl Play | April 14, 2021; 978-4-09-850513-5 | July 14, 2026; 978-1-9747-6509-6 |
1048. "Why are you crying...?" (なんで泣いてるの…？, Nande naiteru no…?); 1049. "It's Unbelievable!" (信じられない！, Shinjirarenai!); 1050. "Apprentice & Wizard" (見習いとウィザード, Minarai to u~izādo); 1051. "The Eerie Farm" (不気味な農場, Bukimina nōjō); 1052. "Clumsiness and suspicions" (不器用さと疑い, Bukiyō-sa to utagai); 1053. "Light" (光, Hikari); 1054. "The strong one is..." (強いのは..., Tsuyoi no wa...); 1055. "Kogoro, Caught in a Dilemma" (小五郎、窮地に陥る, Kogorō, Kyūchi ni Ochiiru); 1056. "A Locked-Room Murder in the Attic" (屋根裏部屋の密室, Yaneurabeya no misshitsu); 1057. "The Reason for the Cipher" (暗号の理由, Angō no Riyū); 1058. "A Deduction Show on TV?!" (TVで推理ショー!?, TV de suiri shō!?)
| 100 | Back in Black | October 18, 2021; 978-4-09-850717-7 | October 13, 2026; 978-1-9747-6546-1 |
1059. "Pre-Show Briefing" (ショーの打ち合わせ, Shō no uchiawase); 1060. "The Show is About to Begin" (ショーはこれから, Shō wa korekara); 1061. "The Bloodstained ID" (血まみれのID, Chimamire no ID); 1062. "The Trap at the Street Corner" (街角の罠, Machikado no wana); 1063. "Dramatic Pursuit in the Dark of Night" (暗い夜の追跡, Kurai yoru no tsuiseki); 1064. "A Light in the Darkness" (闇の中の光, Yami no naka no hikari); 1065. "Hunter and Prey" (ハンターと獲物, Hantā to emono); 1066. "RUM" (ラム, Ramu); 1067. "Secret Pilgrimage" (秘密の巡礼, Himitsu no junrei); 1068. "Observational Survey" (観察調査, Kansatsu chōsa); 1069. "Snowman" (雪だるま, Yukidaruma)
