= Hitori ja Nai (Mai Kuraki song) =

2021 promotional single by Mai Kuraki

Promotional single by Mai Kuraki

from the album Unconditional Love
- Released: August 1, 2021
- Genre: J-pop
- Length: 5:09
- Label: Northern Music
- Songwriter(s): Mai Kuraki; Makoto Wakatabe
- Producer(s): Mai Kuraki; Daiko Nagato

Mai Kuraki promotional singles chronology
"Can You Feel My Heart" (2021)	"Hitori ja Nai" (2021)	"Proof of Being Alive" (2021)

Music video
- "Hitori ja Nai" on YouTube

"Hitori ja Nai" (Japanese: ひとりじゃない, "You're Not Alone") is a song recorded by Japanese singer songwriter Mai Kuraki. It was released as the second promotional single from her thirteenth studio album Unconditional Love, through Northern Music for digital download on 1 August 2021. The song was written in celebration of the tenth anniversary of the Sanrio character series, Wish me mell. This is the second time for Kuraki to write a song for the series, since the singer wrote "Stay the Same" in 2012.

== Track listing ==
Digital download
No.	Title	Writer(s)	Arranger(s)	Length
1.	"Hitori ja Nai"	Mai Kuraki; Makoto Wakatabe	Makoto Wakatabe	5:09
Total length:				5:09

== Charts ==
Chart (2021)	Peak position
Japan Mora Singles (Mora)	100
Japan RecoChoku Singles (Recochoku)	46

== Release history ==
Region	Date	Format	Label	Ref.
Japan	August 1, 2021	Digital download	Northern Music	
