= Kimi to Koi no Mama de Owarenai Itsumo Yume no Mama ja Irarenai =

2019 song by Mai Kuraki

- Standard edition cover

Single by Mai Kuraki

from the album Let's Goal!: Barairo no Jinsei
- Released: March 20, 2019
- Genre: J-pop
- Label: Northern Music
- Songwriters: Mai Kuraki; Taisuke Nakamura
- Producers: Mai Kuraki, KANNONJI

Mai Kuraki singles chronology
"Togetsukyo (Kimi Omou)" (2017)	"Kimi to Koi no Mama de Owarenai Itsumo Yume no Mama ja Irarenai" / "Barairo no Jinsei" (2019)	"Zero kara Hajimete" (2021)

Music video
- "Kimi to Koi no Mama de Owarenai Itsumo Yume no Mama ja Irarenai" on YouTube

"Kimi to Koi no Mama de Owarenai Itsumo Yume no Mama ja Irarenai" (Japanese: きみと恋のままで終われない いつも夢のままじゃいられない) is a song recorded by Japanese singer songwriter Mai Kuraki. It was written by Kuraki and Taisuke Nakamura. The song is set to be released through Northern Music on March 20, 2019, as a double-A side maxi single with "Barairo no Jinsei". The single was released as a digital single and in five physical editions: standard edition, limited edition A/B, Detective Conan edition, and Musing & FC edition. The song was served as the theme song to the Japanese animation Case Closed.

== Promotion ==
=== Meet and greet events ===
In support of the single, Kuraki embarked on the ten-leg meet and greet events. At the tour, Kuraki sang several song and went on to hand her merchandise, mini calendar, to the audiences. Fans were also allowed to do high-fives with her.

Date	City	Country	Venue
Asia
January 20, 2020	Shinagawa, Tokyo	Japan	Gate City Osaki
January 27, 2019	Kyoto, Kyoto	Japan	Aeon Mall Kyoto
February 24, 2019	Sapporo, Hokkaido	Japan	Paseo Center
March 2, 2019	Nisshin, Aichi	Japan	Prime Tree Akaike
March 7, 2019	Yawata, Kyoto	Japan	Iwashimizu Hachimangū
March 8, 2019	Abeno-ku, Osaka	Japan	Abeno Harukas
March 17, 2019	Kasuya District, Fukuoka	Japan	Aeon Mall Fukuoka
March 20, 2019	Hirakata, Osaka	Japan	Kuzuha Mall
March 23, 2019	Shibuya, Tokyo	Japan	Shibuya Tsutaya
March 24, 2019	Ebina, Kanagawa	Japan	Vinawalk

== Commercial performance ==
"Kimi to Koi no Mama de Owarenai Itsumo Yume no Mama ja Irarenai"/"Barairo no Jinsei" debuted on the Oricon Daily Singles Chart at number five. In its second day, the single climbed to number two, behind "Uchōten Shooter" by Matsuri Nine. The single debuted at number four on the Oricon Weekly Singles Chart, selling 23,380 physical copies in its first week. The single became Kuraki's 42nd top ten single, extending her record as the artist with the most consecutive top ten singles in Japan since the debut.

== Music video ==
The short version of an accompanying music video for the song was premiered on Kuraki's YouTube account on February 20, 2019. The full version of the video was not released on YouTube; will be included only in the DVD accompanied with the limited edition A of the single.

== Live performance ==
Kuraki first performed "Kimi to Koi no Mama de Owarenai Itsumo Yume no Mama ja Irarenai", alongside "Barairo no Jinsei", at the meet and greet event on January 20, 2019. She also sang the song at the wedding ceremony of the employee of Samantha Thavasa, as a part of the company's 25th anniversary campaigns.

Kuraki's first televised performance of "Kimi to Koi no Mama de Owarenai Itsumo Yume no Mama ja Irarenai" was at the "Premier Melodix!" on March 18, 2019.

== Media usage ==
In December 2018, it was announced that "Kimi to Koi no Mama de Owarenai Itsumo Yume no Mama ja Irarenai" would serve as a theme song to The Scarlet School Trip, the special episodes of the Japanese animated television series Detective Conan, in which Kuraki also appeared as a voice actor. Later, it was determined that the song would also serve as a theme song to the web television series FHit Music.

== Track listing ==
CD single
No.	Title	Writer(s)	Arranger(s)	Length
1.	"Kimi to Koi no Mama de Owarenai Itsumo Yume no Mama ja Irarenai"	Mai Kuraki; Taisuke Nakamura	Nakamura
2.	"Barairo no Jinsei"	Kuraki; Akihito Tokunaga	Tokunaga
3.	"Kimi to Koi no Mama de Owarenai Itsumo Yume no Mama ja Irarenai" (Instrumental)	Kuraki; Nakamura	Nakamura
4.	"Barairo no Jinsei" (Instrumental)	Tokunaga	Tokunaga

Bonus track (Standard edition)
No.	Title	Writer(s)	Length
5.	"Kimi to Koi no Mama de Owarenai Itsumo Yume no Mama ja Irarenai" (TinyVoice Remix)	Kuraki; Nakamura

DVD (Limited edition A)
No.	Title	Length
1.	"Kimi to Koi no Mama de Owarenai Itsumo Yume no Mama ja Irarenai" (music video)

DVD (Detective Conan edition)
No.	Title	Length
1.	"Detective Conan" (special video)

CD single (Limited edition B)
No.	Title	Writer(s)	Arranger(s)	Length
1.	"Barairo no Jinsei"	Mai Kuraki; Akihito Tokunaga	Tokunaga
2.	"Kimi to Koi no Mama de Owarenai Itsumo Yume no Mama ja Irarenai"	Kuraki; Taisuke Nakamura	Nakamura
3.	"Barairo no Jinsei" (Instrumental)	Kuraki; Tokunaga	Tokunaga
4.	"Kimi to Koi no Mama de Owarenai Itsumo Yume no Mama ja Irarenai" (Instrumental)	Nakamura	Nakamura

DVD (Limited edition B)
No.	Title	Length
1.	"Barairo no Jinsei" (music video)

Digital download (TV Size)
No.	Title	Writer(s)	Arranger(s)	Length
1.	"Kimi to Koi no Mama de Owarenai Itsumo Yume no Mama ja Irarenai" (TV Size)	Mai Kuraki; Taisuke Nakamura	Nakamura	1:22

== Charts ==
Chart (2019)	Peak position
Japan (Japan Hot 100)	13
Japan (Oricon) with "Barairo no Jinsei"	4
Japan Animation (Japan Hot Animation)	4
Japan Download (Japan Top Download Songs)	10

== Certification and sales ==
Region	Certification	Certified units/sales
Japan (RIAJ)		37,291 (physical sales)

== Release history ==
Region	Date	Format	Label	Ref.
Japan	January 13, 2019	Digital download (TV Size)	Northern Music	
Japan	March 20, 2019	CD single (Standard edition)	Northern Music	
Japan	March 20, 2019	CD single/DVD (Detective Conan edition)	Northern Music	
Japan	March 20, 2019	CD single/DVD (Limited edition A)	Northern Music	
Japan	March 20, 2019	CD single/DVD (Limited edition B)	Northern Music	
Japan	March 20, 2019	CD single (Musing & FC edition)	Northern Music	
Japan	March 20, 2019	Digital download	Northern Music	
Japan	March 6, 2021	Streaming	Northern Music	
