= Barairo no Jinsei =

2019 song by Mai Kuraki

- Limited edition B cover

Single by Mai Kuraki

from the album Let's Goal!: Barairo no Jinsei
- Released: March 20, 2019
- Genre: J-pop
- Label: Northern Music
- Songwriter(s): Mai Kuraki; Akihito Tokunaga
- Producer(s): Mai Kuraki, KANNONJI

Mai Kuraki singles chronology
"Togetsukyo (Kimi Omou)" (2017)	"Barairo no Jinsei" / "Kimi to Koi no Mama de Owarenai Itsumo Yume no Mama ja Irarenai" (2019)	"Zero kara Hajimete" (2021)

Music video
- "Barairo no Jinsei" on YouTube

"Barairo no Jinsei" (Japanese: 薔薇色の人生) is a song recorded by Japanese singer songwriter Mai Kuraki. It was written by Mai Kuraki and Akihito Tokunaga. The song is set to be released through Northern Music on March 20, 2019, as a double-A side with "Kimi to Koi no Mama de Owarenai Itsumo Yume no Mama ja Irarenai". The single was released as a digital single and in five physical editions: standard edition, limited edition A/B, Detective Conan edition, and Musing & FC edition. The song was served as the theme song to the Japanese animation Case Closed.

== Promotion ==
=== Meet and greet events ===
In support of the single, Kuraki embarked on the ten-leg meet and greet events. At the tour, Kuraki sang several song and went on to hand her merchandise, mini calendar, to the audiences. Fans were also allowed to do high-fives with her.

Date	City	Country	Venue
Asia
January 20, 2019	Shinagawa, Tokyo	Japan	Gate City Osaki
January 27, 2019	Kyoto, Kyoto	Japan	Aeon Mall Kyoto
February 24, 2019	Sapporo, Hokkaido	Japan	Paseo Center
March 2, 2019	Nisshin, Aichi	Japan	Prime Tree Akaike
March 7, 2019	Yawata, Kyoto	Japan	Iwashimizu Hachimangū
March 8, 2019	Abeno-ku, Osaka	Japan	Abeno Harukas
March 17, 2019	Kasuya District, Fukuoka	Japan	Aeon Mall Fukuoka
March 20, 2019	Hirakata, Osaka	Japan	Kuzuha Mall
March 23, 2019	Shibuya, Tokyo	Japan	Shibuya Tsutaya
March 24, 2019	Ebina, Kanagawa	Japan	Vinawalk

== Music video ==
The short version of an accompanying music video for the song was premiered on Kuraki's YouTube account on February 20, 2019. The full version of the video was not released on YouTube; will be included only in the DVD accompanied with the limited edition B of the single.

== Live performance ==
Kuraki first performed "Barairo no Jinsei", alongside "Kimi to Koi no Mama de Owarenai Itsumo Yume no Mama ja Irarenai", at the meet and greet event on January 20, 2019.

== Track listing ==
CD single (Limited edition B)
No.	Title	Writer(s)	Arranger(s)	Length
1.	"Barairo no Jinsei"	Mai Kuraki; Akihito Tokunaga	Tokunaga
2.	"Kimi to Koi no Mama de Owarenai Itsumo Yume no Mama ja Irarenai"	Kuraki; Taisuke Nakamura	Nakamura
3.	"Barairo no Jinsei" (Instrumental)	Kuraki; Tokunaga	Tokunaga
4.	"Kimi to Koi no Mama de Owarenai Itsumo Yume no Mama ja Irarenai" (Instrumental)	Nakamura	Nakamura

DVD (Limited edition B)
No.	Title	Length
1.	"Barairo no Jinsei" (music video)

CD single
No.	Title	Writer(s)	Arranger(s)	Length
1.	"Kimi to Koi no Mama de Owarenai Itsumo Yume no Mama ja Irarenai"	Mai Kuraki; Taisuke Nakamura	Nakamura
2.	"Barairo no Jinsei"	Kuraki; Akihito Tokunaga	Tokunaga
3.	"Kimi to Koi no Mama de Owarenai Itsumo Yume no Mama ja Irarenai" (Instrumental)	Kuraki; Nakamura	Nakamura
4.	"Barairo no Jinsei" (Instrumental)	Tokunaga	Tokunaga

Bonus track (Standard edition)
No.	Title	Writer(s)	Length
5.	"Kimi to Koi no Mama de Owarenai Itsumo Yume no Mama ja Irarenai" (TinyVoice Remix)	Kuraki; Nakamura

DVD (Limited edition A)
No.	Title	Length
1.	"Kimi to Koi no Mama de Owarenai Itsumo Yume no Mama ja Irarenai" (music video)

DVD (Detective Conan edition)
No.	Title	Length
1.	"Detective Conan" (special video)

Digital download (TV Size)
No.	Title	Writer(s)	Arranger(s)	Length
1.	"Barairo no Jinsei" (TV Size)	Mai Kuraki; Akihito Tokunaga	Tokunaga	1:56

== Charts ==
Chart (2019)	Peak position
Japan (Oricon) with "Kimi to Koi no Mama..."	4
Japan Animation (Japan Hot Animation)	19
Japan Download (Japan Top Download Songs)	15

== Certification and sales ==
Region	Certification	Certified units/sales
Japan (RIAJ)		37,291 (physical sales)

== Release history ==
Region	Date	Format	Label	Ref.
Japan	January 13, 2019	Digital download (TV Size)	Northern Music	
Japan	March 20, 2019	CD single (Standard edition)	Northern Music	
Japan	March 20, 2019	CD single/DVD (Detective Conan edition)	Northern Music	
Japan	March 20, 2019	CD single/DVD (Limited edition A)	Northern Music	
Japan	March 20, 2019	CD single/DVD (Limited edition B)	Northern Music	
Japan	March 20, 2019	CD single (Musing & FC edition)	Northern Music	
Japan	March 20, 2019	Digital download	Northern Music	
Japan	March 6, 2021	Streaming	Northern Music	
