= 2021 in Japanese music =

The year 2021 in Japanese music.

== Debuting ==
=== Debuting groups ===
- ≠Me
- AB6IX
- ASP
- Be First
- Enhypen
- Ho6la
- INI
- Itzy
- Loona
- Naniwa Danshi
- NIK
- Rocket Punch
- Treasure

=== Debuting soloists ===
- Miku Kobato (as Cluppo)
- Takuya Eguchi
- Ai Hashimoto
- Masato Hayakawa
- Miyu Honda
- Marina Horiuchi
- Elaiza Ikeda
- Takanori Iwata
- Reina Kondō
- Marika Kōno
- Kanako Momota
- Hiroki Moriuchi
- Takuma Nagatsuka
- Yurie Neno as a member of Sweet Pop Candy
- Miho Okasaki
- Aguri Ōnishi
- Anna Suzuki
- Rie Takahashi
- Wonho
- Daiki Yamashita

== Returning from hiatus ==
=== Returning groups ===
- Ajico
- Funky Monkey Babys
- Nirgilis
- Rythem
- TM Network

=== Returning soloists ===
- Fullkawa Honpo
- Yūzō Kayama
- Noriyuki Makihara
- Shiori Niiyama
- Naoya Urata

== Events ==
- 72nd NHK Kōhaku Uta Gassen

== Number-ones ==
- Oricon number-one albums
- Oricon number-one singles
- Hot 100 number-one singles

== Awards ==
- 63rd Japan Record Awards
- 2021 MTV Video Music Awards Japan

== Albums released ==
=== January ===
Date	Album	Artist	Ref.
1	Sukkarakan	Eito	
1	Love Live! Sunshine!! Kurosawa Dia First Solo Concert Album ~White First Love~	Arisa Komiya	
1	Enka Yume no Kyōen	Yukino Ichikawa, Kohei Fukuda	
6	Mikunoyoasobi	Ayase	
6	Bokutachi No Denkosekka	Greeeen	
6	Sweet Hug	Misako Uno	
6	1ST	SixTones	
6	Wadachi	Spyair	
6	Suki Suki Ronchan	Suki Suki Ronchan	
6	The Book	Yoasobi	
13	One	7order	
13	Tasekai kaishaku	Genin Wa Jibun Ni Aru.	
13	Japanese Star	Girls²	
13	Reincarnation	Go to the Beds	
13	Straight Outta Rhyme Anima	Hypnosis Mic: Division Rap Battle	
13	Guinea Pig Lab	Kyuso Nekokami	
13	Hyaku hi Ryōran-sen	LatuLatu	
13	Speed Music Box - All The Memories -	Speed	
13	"Idolish7 Second Beat" Original Soundtrack "Beyond The Shine"	Tatsuya Kato	
15	Kōkyō kumikyoku uchūsenkan'yamato 2202	Akira Miyagawa	
20	Baekhyun	Baekhyun	
20	Unseen World	Band-Maid	
20	Six	Da-ice	
20	Pop In City ~For Covers Only~	Deen	
20	D4DJ Groovy Mix Cover Tracks Vol.1	Happy Around!, Peaky P-key, Photon Maiden, Merm4id, Rondo, Lyrical Lily	
20	Sing;est	Hiroki Moriuchi	
20	~10th Anniversary~ "Princess Assemble"	Houkago Princess	
20	Ghost in the Shell Superb Music	Kenji Kawai, Yoko Kanno, Cornelius	
20	Gradation	Little Glee Monster	
20	Mamejor!	Mameshiba no Taigun	
20	Sabitsuku made	Miyashita Yuu	
20	20th Anniversary Best Kachō Fūgetsu	Monkey Majik	
20	Theory	Oisicle Melonpan	
20	Mādadayo	Satoshi Hayashibe	
20	To Redefine/To Be Defined	Survive Said The Prophet	
20	The Idolmaster Shiny Colors Colorful Feathers -Stella-	Team.Stella	
20	Green Giraffe	Toshinori Yonekura	
20	Still Dreaming	Tomorrow X Together	
25	Hikigatari Live	Chiharu Matsuyama	
27	Just Believe You	All At Once	
27	Hyaku Nozomi Yakō	Asca	
27	Boymen the Universe	Boys and Men	
27	Aster	Colon	
27	Harami Teishoku DX ~Streetpiano Collection~ "O Kawari"	Harami-chan	
27	Mother Music Revisited	Keiichi Suzuki	
27	Tomaranai Kazeguruma	Little Parade	
27	"Love Live! Nijigasaki High School Idol Club" Original Soundtrack "Sound of Tokimeki"	Naoki Endo, Nijigasaki High School Idol Club	
27	Chaosix	Nobuhiko Okamoto	
27	10ct	Predia	
27	Note	Ryo Nishikido	
27	Find Fuse in Youth	Soshi Sakiyama	
27	Star	Super Junior	
27	"Dear Vocalist Raving Beats!!!" Lumiere Vo.Re-o-do	Toshiki Masuda	
27	Physical	Yoru no Honki Dance	
27	Sōsaku	Yorushika	
30	"Cherry Magic! Thirty Years of Virginity Can Make You a Wizard?!" Original Soundtrack	Horiguchi Junka	

=== February ===
Date	Album	Artist	Ref.
3	The End	Aina the End	
3	Billow	Keina Suda	
3	Reboot	Madkid	
3	Travel	Mamamoo	
3	Green Diary	Megumi Nakajima	
3	Kimi ga Ita kara	Pixmix	
3	Frontier	Ryo Kitazono	
3	You Can Change My Life	Sung Si-kyung	
3	I Love You	Super Beaver	
3	Live Loud	The Yellow Monkey	
3	Sakkac Craft	Tsumiki	
10	The Idolmaster Master Artist 4 07 Miki Hoshii	Akiko Hasegawa	
10	15	Cali Gari	
10	The Idolmaster Master Artist 4 08 Miura Azusa	Chiaki Takahashi	
10	America/Hosono Haruomi Live in US 2019	Haruomi Hosono	
10	One Wish EP	Man with a Mission	
10	The Millennium Parade	Millennium Parade	
10	Love Live" Sunshine Matsuura Kanan First Solo Concert Album ~Sakana ka nandaka?~	Nanaka Suwa	
10	The Idolmaster Master Artist 4 09 Ritsuko Akizuki	Naomi Wakabayashi	
10	Sekadepa!	Qumali Depart	
10	Sekai no Owari 2010–2019	Sekai no Owari	
10	Hachijuokubunnoichi: to you	Sonar Pocket	
10	Two-Mix 25th Anniversary All Time Best	Two-Mix	
10	Gusare	Zutomayo	
14	Seiko Matsuda 40th Anniversary Bible -bright moment-	Seiko Matsuda	
17	Aces	AtToKun	
17	Chō kakumei-teki koisuru nichijō	Azumi Waki	
17	Gardenia Jasminoides	Cocco	
17	Fake Land	Fake Type	
17	Ethernity	For Tracy Hyde	
17	Reamp	Hitorie	
17	Yakou Himitsu	Indigo la End	
17	Between The World And Me	Inoran	
17	Loveholic	NCT 127	
17	Guts Entertainment	Su-xing-cyu	
17	The Idolmaster Shiny Colors Colorful Feathers -Luna-	Team.Luna	
17	Vacation	TFG	
17	Vivid Vice	Who-ya Extended	
21	Suikyō Kyoku	Yuki Saito	
24	It's All Me, Vol. 2	Ai	
24	Killing Idols	Bis	
24	X	Dish	
24	Hanaemi	HY	
24	Believe	Jel	
24	Hypnosis Mic -Division Rap Battle- 2nd D.R.B "Matenro VS Buster Bros!!!"	Matenro, Buster Bros!!!	
24	Masahiro Tanaka	Momoiro Clover Z	
24	Love Live! Nijigasaki Gakuen ~Good Morning ohayō hōsō-shitsu~ Drama CD Youth Capriccio	Nijigasaki High School Idol Club	
24	"Dear Vocalist Raving Beats!!!" Brave Child Vo. Joshua	Nobunaga Shimazaki	
24	Kyō Sō	Pure White Canvas	
24	Pure x Pure x Pure	Purely Monster	
24	Fiction	Rikako Aida	
24	Three	Sayonara Poesie	
24	Subekaraku Matsuri	Subekaraku Kai	
24	Digitalian is Eating Breakfast Special Edition	Tetsuya Komuro	
24	Reboot	The Rampage from Exile Tribe	
24	Sutekina otona ni naru hōhō	Tota Kasamura	
24	Useless	XIIX	
24	Natural	Yui	

=== March ===
Date	Album	Artist	Ref.
3	Doushitatte Tsutaerarenaikara	Aiko	
3	Reboot	Airi Miyakawa	
3	Cryamy -Red Album-	Cryamy	
3	SS	Devil Anthem.	
3	IV	Hiroyuki Sawano	
3	Katashigure	Hiroyuki Yoshino	
3	Fizzy Pop Syndrome	Kiro Akiyama	
3	Canvas	Keisuke Ueda	
3	15th Anniversary Hikigatari Best	Maiko Fujita	
3	Paradises Return	Paradises	
3	Bravely Default II Original Soundtrack	Revo	
3	L	Sakurako Ohara	
3	SZ10TH	Sexy Zone	
3	Shibuya	Shibu3 Project	
3	Peacepeace	Sky Peace	
3	Amusic	Sumika	
3	Ska=Almighty	Tokyo Ska Paradise Orchestra	
3	LP	Towa Tei	
3	New World	Trio Ohashi	
3	Saikyō Tsubomi DX	Tsubomi	
3	Ningen Gekijō	Yurry Canon	
3	Self Selection "Hip Hop"	Ai	
4	Love Live! Sunshine!! Kunikida Hanamaru First Solo Concert Album～Oyasuminasan!～	Kanako Takatsuki	
10	Ai Kayano 10th Memorial Book & Mini Album "Musunde Hiraite"	Ai Kayano	
10	Sudachi no Uta / Life is Cider	Anemoneria	
10	Appare! Parade	Appare!	
10	Hypnosis Mic -Division Rap Battle- 2nd D.R.B "Bad Ass Temple VS Matenro"	Bad Ass Temple, Matenro	
10	I Love You	Fujifabric	
10	A Cappella 2	Gospellers	
10	Bokutachi no Gunzō	Granrodeo	
10	One Last Kiss	Hikaru Utada	
10	This Is Not A Song	Jun. K	
10	Glory, Glory, to the World	Lovebites	
10	Button	Sakura Shimeji	
10	Aoi Honoo	Shizuka Kudo	
10	The Idolmaster Shiny Colors Colorful Feathers -Sol-	Team.Sol	
10	Octopath Traveler Original Soundtrack	Yasunori Nishiki	
10	Asagao	Yuta Orisaka	
11	2+0+2+1+3+1+1= 10 years 10 songs	Radwimps	
13	Gurenge / Flame	Lisa	
14	Only One	3LDK	
14	20XX "The Best"	W-inds	
16	Thanatos	Inuwasi	
17	Where's My History?	Alexandros	
17	M.C.A・T Da Pump Mix	Da Pump	
17	'Funfare	Fudanjuku	
17	One	Gyroaxia	
17	Rainbow	Johnny's West	
17	Akahoshi Ao Hoshi	Kayoko Yoshizawa	
17	Debut 20th Anniversary Recital @ Nippon Budokan	Keisuke Yamauchi	
17	Duets	Maaya Sakamoto	
17	Evergreen 2	Motohiro Hata	
17	Sunny!!	Pmarusama	
17	Shiro Sagisu Music from "Shin Evangelion"	Shirō Sagisu	
17	Velvet Night	Shoose	
17	Cure	Sirup	
17	8 Infinity	Solidemo	
17	Breaking Dawn	The Boyz	
17	It's A Perfect Blue	Tokyo 7th Sisters	
17	Twilight Wanderers -Best of Yuji Nakada 2011-2020-	Yuji Nakada	
17	"Haikyū!! To The Top" Original Soundtrack	Yuki Hayashi, Asami Tachibana	
21	A Long Vacation 30th Anniversary Edition	Eiichi Ohtaki	
24	One Of Us	Afterglow	
24	Enter	Akira Takano	
24	Into the A to Z	Ateez	
24	Colony	BIN	
24	Hypnosismic -Division Rap Battle- 2nd D.R.B "Fling Posse VS Mad Trigger Crew"	Fling Posse, Mad Trigger Crew	
24	Pandora	Go!Go!Vanillas	
24	55 Stones	Kazuyoshi Saito	
24	Piece	Kenji Urai	
24	Full Colors	Oldcodex	
24	"Dear Vocalist Raving Beats !!!" Kagaribi Vo. Juda	Sōma Saitō	
24	"Shoujo ☆ Kageki Review Starlight" Best Album	Starlight Kuku Gumi	
24	Ghost Album	Tempalay	
24	Seishun to Band wa Tanoshikute Mendokusai	The Coinlockers	
24	For U	Yusuke Kamiji	
28	Singer 7	Aya Shimazu	
30	30th Anniversary Best Album "Vintage Denim"	Megumi Hayashibara	
31	"Yuru Camp Season 2" Original Soundtrack	Akiyuki Tateyama	
31	Hakkō-tai	Hanaregumi	
31	Who?	Ikimono-gakari	
31	Ketsuno Paradise	Ketsumeishi	
31	Shin uchū + Warp Drive II	Kirameki Unforent	
31	"Yamiyonikarasu, yuki ni sag" kanzen seisan gentei-ban	Lacco Tower	
31	16th ~That's J-POP~	Morning Musume	
31	Mata Aitaito Omoeru Tomoni, Jinseide Nannin Meguriaeruka?	High School 3-C	
31	Unite	Spyair	
31	The First Step: Treasure Effect	Treasure	
31	"Uma Musume Pretty Derby Season 2" Animation Derby Season 2 Vol. 3 Original Soundtrack	Utamaro Movement	

=== April ===
Date	Album	Artist	Ref.
4	Your Mori.	Mori Calliope	
7	Chōtokkyū ≠Me Iki	≠Me	
7	First E.P	Backdrop Cinderella	
7	Music Wardrobe	Five New Old	
7	Caramel Guerrilla	Kenichi Asai	
7	Kyū	Kizu	
7	Wonderland	Lyrical School	
7	Odds and Ends	Nishina	
7	The World	Regal Lily	
7	Uya Muya	ShishiShishi	
7	3	Six Lounge	
8	A Ballads 2	Ayumi Hamasaki	
14	Walpurgis	Aimer	
14	Yosuga	Ayano Kaneko	
14	Only One / Guerrilla's Way	Boom Trigger	
14	"Detective Conan: The Scarlet Bullet" Original Soundtrack	Katsuo Ōno	
14	Kotoba to Ongaku	Sakanamon	
14	Acoustique Electrick Sessions 2020	Toru Kitajima	
14	Yesworld	Toru Kitajima	
15	Tsukiyo no Ongakkai	Akiko Shikata	
17	Love Live! Sunshine!! Watanabe You First Solo Concert Album	Shuka Saitō	
21	Talk About Everything	Airblue	
21	Radiant Memories	Ayahi Takagaki	
21	Joyful Style	Bradio	
21	Mystere	Haruka Yamazaki	
21	"Jujutsu Kaisen" Original Soundtrack	Hiroaki Tsutsumi, Yoshimasa Terui, Alisa Okehazama	
21	Bouquet	Hololive Idol Project	
21	SadaDon ShinJibunFudoki III	Masashi Sada	
21	Etc.works3	Mongol800	
21	Best Album "Myōjō"	Mucc	
21	New Gravity	Nulbarich	
21	Enchant	Orbit	
21	Sukima Switch Tour 2020-2021 Smoothie	Sukima Switch	
21	Fly! Fly! Fly!	T-Square	
21	Colorless	Taichi Mukai	
21	Eguism	Takuya Eguchi	
21	Latte	Tsubasa Sakiyama	
21	Big Jumbo Jet	Umeda Cypher	
21	Fruitful	Yasuyuki Horigome	
21	SDR	Ziggy	
28	25 Years After All Time Best	Chihiro Yonekura	
28	Girls Revolution / Party Time!	Girls²	
28	One Love Anthology	Glay	
28	Oneway Generation	Kishidan	
28	Diabolik Lovers Daylight Vol.2 Sakama Shuu	Kōsuke Toriumi	
28	"Dear Vocalist Raving Beats!!!" Jet Rat Fury Vo.Yuu	Natsuki Hanae	
28	Opening Declaration	Novelbright	
28	Genius Love	Quruli	
28	Piofiore no Banshō Evening Bell Character Drama CD Vol.1 Nikola Francesca	Ryōhei Kimura	
28	Be Brave	Shinya Kiyozuka	
28	Forced Shutdown	Tomori Kusunoki	
28	Ai Kotoba.	Yukari Tamura	
28	Terminal	Yuki	

=== May ===
Date	Album	Artist	Ref.
5	Flavors of Love	Monsta X	
12	Zenbu, Naisho.	=Love	
12	Tasogare-Resonance	Calmera	
12	Atarashī Seikatsu	Cubers	
12	Utai tsugu! Nihon no hayariuta Part 2	Hiroshi Miyama	
12	Moving Days	Homecomings	
12	Anataninaritakatta	Ken Hirai	
12	Off	Nao Tōyama	
12	"Girls und Panzer" Original Soundtrack	Shiro Hamaguchi	
12	Electric Jellyfish	Tokusatsu	
12	Will Never Die	You the Rock	
12	Ainodeban + Thanks to	Yu Sakai	
18	Love Virus	Yurimental	
19	Battle & Message	Angela	
19	BanMon! Best goku nakayoshi teki sekai	Band Ja Naimon!	
19	Ladybug	Lisa	
19	This is Youth	Longman	
19	Freak	Necry Talkie	
19	Title Idol	Pastel*Palettes	
19	Musicaloud #38 Act.3	Sayaka Kanda	
21	Wink	Chai	
21	Aoppella -aoppella!?-	Riruhapi, FYA'M'	
24	Ame*Sta EP	Ame*Sta	
25	Kitto Anohi Bokuha Shinda	=Conect	
25	Oneday Everyday	Dan Dan	
26	Setsuzoku	Ajico	
26	Anal Sex Penis	ASP	
26	2nd Step	Camellia Factory	
26	Wakainagara mo rekishi ari 96.3.2@新宿Liquid Room	Fishmans	
26	Atarashii Kajitsu	Grapevine	
26	Gekokujō	Hanasaki Morinaka	
26	4Wheels 9Lives	Ken Yokoyama	
26	"Tengaramon" Original Soundtrack	Kow Otani	
26	Superspin	Kuzira	
26	Utamonogatari	Mai Mizuhashi	
26	Nonochan 2sai Kodomo Uta	Nonoka Murakata	
26	Sekirara	Polkadot Stingray	
26	Piofiore no Banshō Character Drama CD Vol.2 Gilbert Redford	Showtaro Morikubo	
26	OT Works II	Taiiku Okazaki	
26	Mass	The Gazette	
26	"Dear Vocalist Raving Beats!!!" Veronica Vo. Momochi	Toshiyuki Toyonaga	
26	Flight	Win Morisaki	
26	Overseas Highway	Wolpis Carter	
29	XXV	Mitsuhiro Oikawa	

=== June ===
Date	Album	Artist	Ref.
2	Simple is Best	Aoi Teshima	
2	Save Your Life Ayaka Hirahara All Time Live Best	Ayaka Hirahara	
2	Parade Shon	BabyKingdom	
2	Toumei	Civilian	
2	Aru Nitsu... eien mitai ni!	Cyaron!	
2	Trinity	Future Foundation	
2	Love Person	Hideaki Tokunaga	
2	Mask a Raid	Kamen Joshi	
2	Playful	Koichi Domoto	
2	Lovely Best Complete Lovely2 Songs	Lovely²	
2	Auguries	The Songbards	
6	Tokyo Invader	Iginari Tohoku San	
9	Starlight	Wagakki Band	
9	PvP	ZOC	
14	Do or Not	Pentagon	
16	BTS, the Best	BTS	
18	Zutto Zutto Zutto	Ryokuoushoku Shakai	
28	Superstar	Shinee	

=== July ===
Date	Album	Artist	Ref.
11	Pontoon	Asaka	
21	Re:Sense	King & Prince	
28	Perfect World	Twice	

=== August ===
Date	Album	Artist	Ref.
4	Aoi Inochi	Hiroko Moriguchi	
4	Bubble Up!	Rocket Punch	
18	Editorial	Official Hige Dandism	

=== September ===
Date	Album	Artist	Ref.
1	DIALOGUE+1	Dialogue	
1	What'z Itzy?	Itzy	
1	Beside You	Ran Itō	
8	Gacharic Spin	Gacharic Spin	
27	Self Selection "Piano Ballad"	Ai	
29	Mary's Blood	Mary's Blood	
29	With Me Again	2PM	

=== October ===
Date	Album	Artist	Ref.
27	Scorpion Moon	Thelma Aoyoma	
27	Unconditional Love	Mai Kuraki	
27	Candy Racer	Kyary Pamyu Pamyu	
27	Outsider	BtoB	

=== November ===
Date	Album	Artist	Ref.
10	Bright Future	Empire	
10	Chaotic Wonderland	Tomorrow X Together	
23	Forever Daze	Radwimps	
24	U	NiziU	
24	Absolute 6ix	AB6IX	

=== December ===
Date	Album	Artist	Ref.
1	The Book 2	Yoasobi	
6	Best: 2000-2020	Koda Kumi	
8	Human	Max Changmin	
8	Friends III	B'z	
15	Revive	Nemophila	
15	Time Flies	Nogizaka46	
22	It'z Itzy	Itzy	
22	30	Uverworld	

== Disbanding and retiring artists ==
=== Disbanding ===
- 100%
- AŌP
- Ayumikurikamaki
- Blu-Billion
- Cellchrome
- CY8ER
- Desurabbits
- GFriend
- Hotshot
- Iz*One
- Maison Book Girl
- OnePixcel
- Pink Cres.
- Sakura Gakuin
- V6

=== Retiring ===
- Saki Shimizu
- Chinami Tokunaga
- Nana Yamada
- Mika Sakaki as a member of Sweet Pop Candy

=== Going on hiatus ===
- Gackt
- Rikiya Higashihara
- Kariyushi58
- Maon Kurosaki
- Silent Siren
- Suchmos
- Tokyo Performance Doll
