= Case Closed season 31 =

Season of television series

Case Closed
- Season 31
- The cover of the first DVD compilation for season thirty-one of Detective Conan released by Shogakukan
- No. of episodes: 40

Release
- Original network: NNS (ytv)
- Original release: March 6, 2021 – April 16, 2022

Season chronology
- ← Previous; Season 30 Next → Season 32

The thirty-first season of the Case Closed anime was directed by Yasuichirō Yamamoto and Nobuharu Kamanaka, and produced by TMS Entertainment and Yomiuri Telecasting Corporation. The series is based on Gosho Aoyama's Case Closed manga series. In Japan, the series is titled Meitantei Conan (名探偵コナン, lit. Great Detective Conan, officially translated as Detective Conan) but was changed due to legal issues with the title Detective Conan. The series focuses on the adventures of teenage detective Shinichi Kudo who was turned into a child by a poison called APTX 4869, but continues working as a detective under the alias Conan Edogawa.

The episodes use seven pieces of theme music: three openings and four endings. The first opening theme is ZERO kara Hajimete (ZEROからハジメテ; lit. "Start from Zero") by Mai Kuraki used for episodes 1000–1020. The first ending theme is Reboot by Airi Miyakawa used for episodes 993 in season 30 – 1015. The second ending theme is Veronica (ベロニカ, Beronika) by Mai Kuraki used for episodes 1016–1029. The second opening theme is YURA YURA by Wands used for episodes 1021–1032. The third ending theme is SWEET MOONLIGHT by Breakerz used for episodes 1029–1038. The third opening theme is SLEEPLESS by B'z used for episodes 1033–1048 in season 32. The fourth ending theme is Karappo no Kokoro (空っぽの心; lit. "Empty Heart") by SARD UNDERGROUND used for episodes 1039–1057 in season 32.

The season initially ran from March 6, 2021, through April 16, 2022, on Nippon Television Network System in Japan. The season was later collected and released in ten DVD compilations by Shogakukan between February 24, 2023, and October 25, 2024, in Japan. Crunchyroll began simulcasting the series in October 2014, starting with episode 754. In February 2023, episodes of the anime appeared on Tubi with an English dub, starting at episode 965. This is the first time since 2010 that any episodes of the main anime series have been dubbed and released in English.

== Episode list ==
No. overall	No. in season	Title	Directed by	Written by	Original release date	English release date
1000	1	"The Moonlight Sonata Murder (Part One)"; Transliteration: "Piano Sonata "Gekkō" Satsujin Jiken (Zenpen)" (Japanese: ピアノソナタ『月光』殺人事件（前編）)	Akira Yoshimura	N/A	March 6, 2021	March 15, 2023
Conan, Ran and Kogoro are called to Moonshima, a small island in Izu, in a letter from a mysterious client. However, the client was a pianist who should have died playing the piano sonata "Moonlight" 12 years ago. The third memorial service of the former mayor, which I happened to see at the community center that I visited to investigate the client. In the midst of that, "Moonlight" began to flow...
1001	2	"The Moonlight Sonata Murder (Part Two)"; Transliteration: "Piano Sonata "Gekkō" Satsujin Jiken (Kōhen)" (Japanese: ピアノソナタ『月光』殺人事件（後編）)	Yasuichirō Yamamoto	N/A	March 13, 2021	March 15, 2023
Moonshima, a small island in Izu visited by Conan, Ran, and Kogoro. The third anniversary of the death of the former village mayor was going on at the community center. During that time, "Moonlight" began to flow and the current village mayor was found dead. There is a blood-stained musical score at the scene, and Conan reads the message from the criminal...
1002	3	"The Beika City Shopping Center Garbage Bin Mystery"; Transliteration: "Beika Shōtengai Dasuto Misuterī" (Japanese: 米花商店街ダストミステリー)	Nobuharu Kamanaka	Takeharu Sakurai	April 17, 2021	March 15, 2023
Conan, along with Haibara, and Detective Boys was cleaning the shopping district as a class activity. At that time, the mountain of garbage which gathers in a part by the wall is found. There seems to have been a trash can originally there. There, Conan and his friends learn about the existence of a woman named Chiemi Isojima who was cleaning this area alone. In the shopping district, the number of restaurants and other stores increased, and they were also concerned about the installation of trash cans; they couldn't stand the overflowing trash, so they removed the trash cans. The next day, Conan and his friends came to the shopping district to find garbage in the same place and set out to find the culprit. What is the mystery of the garbage that gathers under the disappeared trash can? Meanwhile, at Teitan High School, where Ran, Sonoko, and Sera attend, ideas for the world sports festival "WSG (World Sports Games)" a global sports festival that occurs once every four years were being recruited, and the world was showing excitement...
1003	4	"The 36-Cell Perfect Game (Part One)"; Transliteration: "Sanjūroku Masu no Pāfekuto Gēmu (Zenpen)" (Japanese: 36マスの完全犯罪（前編）)	Akira Yoshimura	N/A	April 24, 2021	March 16, 2023
Kogoro, Conan, Amuro, and "Irohara Sushi" craftsman Kanenori Wakita were heading to Nagano, replacing Sonoko, who was originally supposed to go with them, had a fever, and Ran, who was going to visit her. This was because the client, Yasuo Hihara, wrote in the letter, "Be sure to come with four people." The letter also contained a piece of paper written in katakana cipher. The four of them arrived at an abandoned church in the depths of a snowstorm. In the chapel were Yorito Fujide, a high school teacher, Kohei Wada, an office worker, Ikue Furuura, a banker, Yosuke Kawasaki, a banker, and Sumiya Nishino, a bartender. In their conversation, Conan and his friends find out that their client, Hihara, committed suicide here two months ago. Suddenly, a loud sound echoes and the parking lot where the car was parked collapses. The nine of them gets stuck and contacts the Nagano Prefectural Police. However, The Nagano Prefectural Police's Kansuke Yamato, Yui Uehara, and Takaaki Morofushi, who came to the site, confirmed that the entrance of the tunnel was blocked by the avalanche and could not be picked up immediately. They instruct them to wait in the church. Meanwhile, Takaaki, who had come to the scene, felt the smell of gunpowder from the tunnel and inferred that it was an artificial avalanche that was carried out to trap the people who came to the church. On the other hand, Conan and his friends, who will spend the night at the church, begin to prepare and break the code.
1004	5	"The 36-Cell Perfect Game (Part Two)"; Transliteration: "Sanjūroku Masu no Pāfekuto Gēmu (Chūhen)" (Japanese: 36マスの完全犯罪（中編）)	Minoru Tozawa	N/A	May 1, 2021	March 15, 2023
Kogoro, Conan, Amuro, and "Irohara Sushi" craftsman Wakita head to an abandoned church after receiving a request. The nine of them, including a former high school classmate of the client, Yasuo Hihara, divide their roles and prepare to spend the night in the abandoned hospital, but Wada, an office worker, is found dead in the bathroom with a gunshot wound between the eyes. Immediately, Kogoro contacts the Nagano Prefectural Police. Kansuke Yamato, Yui Uehara, and Takaaki Morofuhi watch the video of the crime scene sent by Kogoro. When Morofushi sees the image of Amuro in the video, he thinks to himself, "I saw him somewhere before." Since they don't know what will happen next, the eight decide to work in pairs. Conan teams up with Amuro and returns to the restroom to begin their investigation. Conan asks Amuro about the "Rum" of the Black Organization, but Amuro is confused and tells him that the person is very impatient. Meanwhile, the remaining six hear the sound of breaking glass and decide on a pair to go check it out. They take three of the five cases of mint tablets, empty the remaining two, and mix them up so that they don't know which ones they have emptied. The pair that draws the case that contains the contents and makes the sound goes to check on it. The pair that was to go and see what was going on was Nishino, a bartender, and Kawasaki, a banker, who had proposed the lottery and was the last to draw a case. After a while, Nishino comes back alone. As soon as he saw the mail Kawasaki had received, he changed his color and went to the bathroom. At that moment, a scream echoes out and Kawasaki is found poisoned to death in the bathroom. A new piece of paper with a new code was found on the floor.
1005	6	"The 36-Cell Perfect Game (Part Three)"; Transliteration: "Sanjūroku Masu no Pāfekuto Gēmu (Kōhen)" (Japanese: 36マスの完全犯罪（後編）)	Nobuharu Kamanaka	N/A	May 8, 2021	March 15, 2023
Conan, Kogoro, Amuro, and "Irohara Sushi" craftsman Wakita came to the abandoned church. Conan and his friends are surrounded by four sheets of cryptography paper with katakana characters, which will be the key to solving the case, but they can't find the clue to decipher it. Then, they receive a call from Inspector Yamato of the Nagano Prefectural Police, who is clearing snow from the tunnel, saying that he will pick them up in about three hours.
1006	7	"Who Poisoned the Victim?"; Transliteration: "Doku o Ireta no wa Dare" (Japanese: 毒を入れたのは誰)	Kōichirō Kuroda	Masaki Tsuji	May 15, 2021	March 29, 2023
Conan and Ran are at a party hosted by the second president of Sasano Financial, Kogoro's client. The president has received a death threat and they are there to be his bodyguards. There are three guests at the party, who seem to have a grudge against the president. As announced, the president was poisoned.
1007	8	"Out For Revenge (Part One)"; Transliteration: "Fukushūsha (Zenpen)" (Japanese: 復讐者（前編）)	Masahiro Takada	Nobuo Ōgizawa	June 5, 2021	March 29, 2023
A brutally murdered body is found, stabbed to death with a knife. When Conan and Kogoro meet Inspector Megure and his team, who are investigating the victim's friends, they learn that his friends are also in Yonehana Town and offer to help. They head to the office of investment consultant Natsukawa, where they find Fuyuki, a financier, and Akiha, a real estate agent. Although they should know about Haruyama and the person who has been holding a grudge against him, the three of them are not cooperating.
1008	9	"Out For Revenge (Part Two)"; Transliteration: "Fukushūsha (Kōhen)" (Japanese: 復讐者（後編）)	Rokō Ogiwara	Nobuo Ōgizawa	June 12, 2021	March 29, 2023
The body of a slaughtered man is found, stabbed to death with a knife, and his friend Natsukawa is also killed in the same way. Based on their relationship, a man named Komoto, who was defrauded out of his money in a fraudulent investment scheme ten years ago, emerges as a suspect. Komoto also appears to Akiba, but accidentally falls off a cliff. The series of murders seems to have come to an end, but the next day, Akiba is found murdered in the same manner. Is Komoto still alive and continuing his revenge?
1009	10	"The Lost Article That Smells Like a Case"; Transliteration: "Otoshimono wa Jiken no Nioi" (Japanese: 落とし物は事件のにおい)	Minoru Tozawa	Jun'ichi Iioka Chisato Matsuda	June 19, 2021	March 29, 2023
Conan arrives at the park where Ayumi picked up the bracelet with Mitsuhiko and Genta. On the road facing the park, there were tire tracks and what looked like blood stains from a car that had sped off. Deciding to return the bracelet to the owner themselves, the Detective Boys go around the accessory stores and come across a certain person.
1010	11	"The Idol Whose Smile Disappeared"; Transliteration: "Egao o Keshita Aidoru" (Japanese: 笑顔を消したアイドル)	Hiroaki Takagi	Yoshio Urasawa	June 26, 2021	March 29, 2023
An officer named Taishi Yamasato, who said that he started working at the police box in Yonehana-cho this month, comes to the Mori Detective Agency. He comes to the office to ask for advice about a dine and dash case at a restaurant in Yonehana-cho, and a similar case in Gaito-cho, where he originally worked. The woman who ate and ran away had blond hair and sunglasses, and looked like Kayoko Kakurai of the idol group DDPP.
1011	12	"Picking Wild Plants and Clovers (Part One)"; Transliteration: "Sansai Gari to Kurōbā (Zenpen)" (Japanese: 山菜狩りとクローバー（前編）)	Kōichirō Kuroda	N/A	July 10, 2021	March 29, 2023
Maika Zenda, a former teacher, takes her fiancé, Toji Fukikoshi, to his manor, where she accuses him of scamming various women, including herself, then brutally murders him. Elsewhere, the Detective Boys, Conan, and Ai prepare for a field trip which is led by Maika. She makes them cover the windows of her car with cardboard then drives them to the forest to collect wild flowers. Maika loses her earring and has Ayumi help her look for it, only to find Shigefumi's corpse, seemingly appearing out of nowhere, leaning against the tree. Inspector Yamamura leads the investigation, and they learn that Toji is a con artist; his real name is Shigefumi Uruma. When Ayumi loses a four leaf clover she found earlier, Conan detects that something eerie is at hand.
1012	13	"Picking Wild Plants and Clovers (Part Two)"; Transliteration: "Sansai Gari to Kurōbā (Kōhen)" (Japanese: 山菜狩りとクローバー（後編）)	Masahiro Takada	N/A	July 17, 2021	March 29, 2023
The investigation discovers Shigefumi's nearby manor and his claustrophobic girlfriend, who is already taken for questioning, covered in his blood. Conan finds Ayumi's lost 4-leaf clover, he tranquilizes Yamamura, a move witnessed by Rumi, revealing Maika to be the killer. She murdered him, then dragged his corpse to the tree and leaving it there before going to great lengths to frame his girlfriend. After picking up everyone, she made them cover the windows with cardboard boxes, thereby blocking their view, and shifted the car into neutral right beside Shigefumi's corpse. Maika lost her earring and used Ayumi as a witness, so as when Maika moved the car with her bare arm, the corpse appears out of nowhere when it had been there the entire time. As evidence, traces of Shigefumi's blood can be found in Maika's driver seat. Maika confesses stating that Shigefumi is a con artist who commits marriage fraud. Ayumi gives Rumi her clover, but Rumi allows it to be blown from her hand, which Conan notices.
1013	14	"The Man Who Loved Too Much"; Transliteration: "Aishi Sugita Otoko" (Japanese: 愛しすぎた男)	Ryūta Kawahara	Kōshirō Mikami	July 24, 2021	March 29, 2023
Conan and Kogoro are on their way to the store to prepare dinner, when they pass a house and see a crowd of people. There was a man lying on the floor with blood pouring from his head in a flamboyant ransacked room. According to the couple of the house, they happened to encounter the burglar. When he attacked them, they fought back and ended up killing him. The case seemed to end in self-defense, but.
1014	15	"The Novelist Known as the Demon King"; Transliteration: "Maō to Yobareta Shōsetsuka" (Japanese: 魔王と呼ばれた小説家)	Minoru Tozawa	Nobuo Ōgizawa	July 31, 2021	March 29, 2023
Conan and Kogoro are walking through the residential area of Yonehana Town when they see a crowd of police and onlookers in front of a mansion. It is the home of Shintaro Tabun, a successful writer, where a body has been found shot to death. A rifle was found in his study, but there were no witnesses. His disciples, Naoya Akaike and Miyuki Izukawa, were the first to discover the body. There were four other disciples, including Ryunosuke Oto and Haruo Chigasaki. As we listened to their stories, we found out that Tabun's works were written by his disciples, and that they had a grudge against him.
1015	16	"Stakeout"; Transliteration: "Harikomi" (Japanese: 張り込み)	Akira Yoshimura	Jun'ichi Iioka Chisato Matsuda	August 14, 2021	–
The Detective Boys witness Detective Chiba buying a large amount of food at a convenience store and follow him. They entered an ordinary apartment building. They thought he might have come to see a friend, but Conan deduced that the apartment was newly built and Detective Chiba was on a stakeout there. He follows him and finds Detective Takagi there as well. The Detective Boys ask him to let them wait until the doctor comes to pick them up, and hear that the reason for the stakeout is the jewelry store robbery and murder that happened last week.
1016	17	"The Monorail Sniper Case (Part One)"; Transliteration: "Monorēru Sogeki Jiken (Zenpen)" (Japanese: モノレール狙撃事件（前編）)	Kōichirō Kuroda	Akatsuki Yamatoya	August 28, 2021	–
Conan and Kogoro are on their way to the bay area when they see a bullet hit the monorail, wounding one of the passengers. The two jump out of the monorail at an emergency stop and pursue the shooter, coming to a room in an apartment building where they think the shooter is.
1017	18	"The Monorail Sniper Case (Part Two)"; Transliteration: "Monorēru Sogeki Jiken (Kōhen)" (Japanese: モノレール狙撃事件（後編）)	Masahiro Takada	Akatsuki Yamatoya	September 4, 2021	–
A bullet injury occurs on the monorail that Conan and Kogoro are riding. The two track down the perpetrator and arrive at an apartment building, but the perpetrator they find there escapes to the Tohto Market. At the Tohto Market, an employee is found bound and with his mouth covered. The culprit steals the employee's belongings and seems to be trying to do something with them.
1018	19	"The Antique Tray Can't Be Hidden (Part One)"; Transliteration: "Kottō Bon wa Kakusenai (Zenpen)" (Japanese: 骨董盆は隠せない（前編）)	Tsurumi Mukaiyama	N/A	September 11, 2021	–
Conan is called to the Agasa residence and learns that Dr. Agasa is planning to make a fortune from a small vintage plate that he brought back from his uncle's villa, and he is going to ask an appraiser he knows. Conan wonders why he has been summoned, but it turns out to be Haibara. Sera had been staking out the front of the Agasa residence, and Haibara was worried. When Ran and Sonoko mention Haibara's name as a "mature child", Haibara gets angry when she hears that Sera is probably checking up on her. Then Okiya comes to bring her some food, and Sera follows her. Sera wants to hear what she has to say, but she can't leave Haibara alone, so they all head for the appraiser. However, the antique art appraiser, Hogen Nishizu, has been beaten by someone at home and is dying. When Agasa hurriedly leaves the room to call the police, the assailant who had been lurking behind appears and stabs Nishizu to death. There were three people at the mansion: Motoyuki Toshima, the president of a securities company, Kinji Chono, the former president of a real estate company, and Suzue Sakamaki, the director of an art museum, who had come to request the authenticity of a black lacquer tray that was said to be worth tens of millions. The culprit and the real black lacquer tray are?
1019	20	"The Antique Tray Can't Be Hidden (Part Two)"; Transliteration: "Kottō Bon wa Kakusenai (Chūhen)" (Japanese: 骨董盆は隠せない（中編）)	Minoru Tozawa	N/A	September 18, 2021	–
Hogen Nishizu, an antique art appraiser, was stabbed to death with a spear. At the scene were Motoyuki Toshima, the president of a securities company, Kinji Chono, the former president of a real estate company, and Suzue Sakamaki, the director of an art museum, who had come to ask for an appraisal of a lacquer artifact called a black lacquer tray. Dr. Agasa remembers how Nishizu looked when he was still breathing. Sera, on the other hand, was concerned about a certain situation with Okiya.
1020	21	"The Antique Tray Can't Be Hidden (Part Three)"; Transliteration: "Kottō Bon wa Kakusenai (Kōhen)" (Japanese: 骨董盆は隠せない（後編）)	Akira Yoshimura	N/A	September 25, 2021	–
An antique art appraiser, Hogen Nishizu, is beaten to death with a spear and then stabbed to death. The police try to find someone who can appraise the black lacquer tray found at the scene but are unable to find him. While searching the house, the police find a box of small plates that Dr. Agasa had asked to be authenticated. According to the housekeeper's information, Nishizu had said, "I want to show this tsutsumi to the guests who come today and see their surprised faces when I explain it to them. Conan notices something when he looks at the small plate and checks again the direction of the black lacquer tray that Agasa saw. This shows that the culprit and his motive was to keep the real black lacquer tray tray for himself. However, the culprit struggles with the fact that he does not remember the original owner, but Conan discovers this from the bloodstains. As for the small plate that Agasa brought in, it was later revealed that it was a small plate that Agasa's uncle had accidentally broken and managed to repair. After solving the case and leaving Sera and Okiya, Conan thinks about Akai's mother, Mary, and her "sister outside the realm." What are her intentions?
1021	22	"Rondo in Bad Company"; Transliteration: "Akuyū-tachi no Rondo" (Japanese: 悪友たちの輪舞)	Yoshihiro Sugai	Nobuo Ōgizawa	October 2, 2021	–
A man's beaten body is found in a small park in Yonehana Town. When Conan and Kogoro pass by, they find out that the victim, Mitsumoto, was a small-time crook with a bad reputation, and was murdered around 7pm last night. At this time, Hosaka, one of Mitsumoto's roguish friends, was seen running from the park.
1022	23	"The Cursed Museum"; Transliteration: "Noroi no Myūjiamu" (Japanese: 呪いのミュージアム)	Kōichirō Kuroda Yōsuke Fujino	Akatsuki Yamatoya	October 9, 2021	–
Conan arrives at the Museum of Ancient Orient Civilization with Ran and Sonoko. The exhibits are replicas and the museum is full of handmade items. What Ran and Sonoko are looking for is an "Egyptian God Key Chain", which seems to be a popular item among high school girls. Conan tries to pass the time while watching the two of them being engrossed in their pursuit, but he finds...
1023	24	"The Whistling Bookstore 3"; Transliteration: "Kiteki no Kikoeru Kosho-ten Surī" (Japanese: 汽笛の聞こえる古書店3)	Masahiro Takada	Yūki Nōtsuka	October 16, 2021	–
Conan and the other Detective Boys were at novelist Kousuke Omura's literature class. They were introduced to Omura by Michiko Yoshikawa, an acquaintance who works at the Tamaki Book Cafe. At that moment, Ryoji Nojima, a book collector who seems to be Omura's sponsor and the owner of the house where the class is held, and Nagisa Takeuchi, a housekeeper, arrive. After Nojima looks through Genta's novel, he becomes angry and...
1024	25	"Ooka Momiji's Challenge (Part One)"; Transliteration: "Ōoka Momiji no Chōsenjō (Zenpen)" (Japanese: 大岡紅葉の挑戦状（前編）)	Ryūta Kawahara	N/A	October 30, 2021	–
Ran receives an e-mail from Momiji Ooka. The message says, "I have a code that I want you to solve for Shinichi Kudo. A housekeeper who worked for a wealthy family for many years has died, leaving a cipher for her four sons. She was a mystery lover and sent one cipher to each of her four sons so that they could work together to find the treasure. Shortly after they shared the cipher, the eldest son lost touch with her. He said that he might have gotten into trouble and asked them to solve the code and look for him. Momiji is coming to Tokyo on this day to tell us more about it.
1025	26	"Ooka Momiji's Challenge (Part Two)"; Transliteration: "Ōoka Momiji no Chōsenjō (Kōhen)" (Japanese: 大岡紅葉の挑戦状（後編）)	Minoru Tozawa	N/A	November 6, 2021	–
At the request of Momiji Ooka, Conan and Heiji are trying to solve a cipher left to his four sons by a housekeeper who worked for a wealthy family for many years. Conan and Heiji arrive at Warehouse No. 4 in the port of Cupido, where they find a man bleeding from the head and three others lying on the floor. They are the four brothers who were left with the code, and the dead body is the eldest son. They were summoned by the eldest son, and when the second son who came first found them, they were already dead, and then the third and fourth sons joined them. From the appearance of the metal-framed glasses that had fallen nearby, Conan and Heiji believe that this was a murder.
1026	27	"The Wordless Witness"; Transliteration: "Ienai Mokugekisha" (Japanese: 言えない目撃者)	Tsurumi Mukaiyama	Tatsurō Inamoto	November 13, 2021	–
Conan, along with Ran and Kogoro, are there when the police are inspecting the scene. Last night, the body of a woman was found bludgeoned to death in an alley. There had been two similar incidents in the area in the last week, and the police seemed to think it was the same person. Because of their drunkenness, the victims in the two cases did not remember anything, and there were no surveillance cameras in the area. As Conan wanders around the crime scene, he sees a house. There is a figure peeking at the scene from the second floor of the house.
1027	28	"Beyond the Curtain"; Transliteration: "Kāten no Mukōgawa" (Japanese: カーテンの向こう側)	Akira Yoshimura	Akatsuki Yamatoya	November 20, 2021	–
Dr. Agasa, Motota, Mitsuhiko, and Ayumi were having dinner at a restaurant on the third floor of a building in the city. As they sit looking out, they see through the curtains of an apartment building across the street a man and a woman who look like they are having a friendly party. Then it changes to a woman being attacked by a man. The four panic and call the police, but the only people in the room where they saw the shadow are a woman named Yuko Kokubu, who seems to be the owner of the house, and her dog. The policeman who checked the room also said that there was only a woman in the room, so they were not taken seriously. Motota, Mitsuhiko, and Ayumi visit Conan to discuss this matter. They all saw the same silhouette, but Motota thought it looked like a detective interrogating a suspect, Mitsuhiko thought it looked like a couple about to propose, and Ayumi thought it looked like an old man and an old woman playing in the sun. Conan, who was listening to the story, came to a conclusion. Conan and his friends come to Yuko's apartment again, accompanied by Detective Takagi. Yuko is not in her room, and there is no sign of her dog, which she said she kept. However, there were bloodstains that had been wiped away, broken plates in the trash, and a cracked photo frame. A further search reveals a photo of Yuko with short hair, leading to the conclusion that the silhouette with short hair is Yuko and the victim is the one with long hair. Yuko let only the policeman into the room because she thought she could fool him by saying that a woman had been attacked by a man. However, he thought it was only a matter of time before he was found out, and he had already left the room with a large suitcase. Conan thinks that Yuko has decided that she can escape the police's pursuit as long as they don't find the body, and when he checks her social networking site, he finds that she is on her way to work as usual with the body.
1028	29	"Ballad of the Woman Who Loved Cake"; Transliteration: "Kēki o Aisuru Onna no Barādo" (Japanese: ケーキを愛する女のバラード)	Kōichirō Kuroda Yōsuke Fujino	Yoshio Urasawa	November 27, 2021	–
Motota, Mitsuhiko, and Ayumi are talking in front of an abandoned building where a new factory is planned to be built when they discover a right hand sticking out of the concrete wreckage. Conan finds the three people who had fainted and listens to their story and discovers a moving bloodstain. Conan thinks that the person whose hand the three saw is alive and moving. The four of them follow it to the "Confectioner's Paradise" store and remember that they were talking here a week ago. The beautiful woman they saw at that time was also eating the same cake at the same table at this time.
1029	30	"Police Academy Arc Wild Police Story CASE. Matsuda Jinpei"; Transliteration: "Keisatsu Gakkō-hen Wairudo Porīsu Sutōrī Kēsu. Matsuda Jinpei" (Japanese: 警察学校編 Wild Police Story CASE.松田陣平)	Nobuharu Kamanaka	N/A	December 4, 2021	–
It's nighttime at the Metropolitan Police Academy. As the cherry blossoms are falling, the sound of Rei Furuya and Jinpei Matsuda punching each other echoes through the grounds. Matsuda doesn't like Furuya, who "really wants to become a police officer" despite being in the police academy. The two continued to fight without taking a step back. At 2 a.m., Kagemitsu Morofuse wakes up from a nightmare and he hears a knock on his door. He woke up to a knock at the door, and there was Furuya, covered in wounds. Morofusi, who had been watching him, asked, "Do you think you can get along with this person?", Morobushi asked. At the morning assembly, next to the wounded Furiaya and Matsuda were their classmates Morofusi, Kenji Hagiwara, and Wataru Date. Onizuka Hatsuzo, the instructor at the Onizuka Training Center, asks the reason for their wounds, but Date tactfully tells a lie. Matsuda, who says he hates the police but is able to answer questions about what it means to be a police officer, is questioned by Hatsuzo, and Furiaya begins to investigate his past.
1030	31	"The Blank Year (Part One)"; Transliteration: "Kūhaku no Ichinen (Zenpen)" (Japanese: 空白の一年(前編))	Masahiro Takada	Nobuo Ōgizawa	December 11, 2021	–
While Kogoro is walking through the residential area of Kouri-machi after finishing his work, he hears a scream. When Kogoro goes to the scene, he finds a man named Ritsuo Esaka slumped over. It seems that he was waiting at a traffic light when someone suddenly pushed him in the back and almost hit him with a car. Conan and Kogoro talked to Esaka at the detective agency and found out that he had lost his memory for a year and may have done something to cause a grudge during that time.
1031	32	"The Blank Year (Part Two)"; Transliteration: "Kūhaku no Ichinen (Kōhen)" (Japanese: 空白の一年(後編))	Minoru Tozawa	Nobuo Ōgizawa	December 18, 2021	–
Conan and Kogoro investigate to find the lost year in Kouri-cho, where an amnesiac man named Ritsuo Esaka spent time. Esaka is reunited with the people he spent time with in Kouri Town and almost regains his memory after being barked at by a dog he hates. Two days later, Conan and Kogoro head to Esaka's house with high hopes, only to find out that Esaka has been found dead.
1032	33	"Mori Ran, the Model"; Transliteration: "Moderu, Mōri Ran" (Japanese: モデル、毛利蘭)	Tsurumi Mukaiyama	Chisato Matsuda	December 25, 2021	–
Conan and Ran were in the studio of the painter Ryuji Kasuga. On a day when Ran was out shopping, she was approached by Kasuga in front of a department store and got a part-time job as a model. He was there with his assistant Riko Mitsui and his apprentice Yoshio Komiyama. Komejima is a new artist who has recently become an apprentice, and he seems to have some feelings about Kasuga, who has suddenly started painting female figures. Riko, who is managing Kasuga, doesn't seem to be too happy about it either. Meanwhile, Conan sees something unnaturally shiny outside his window and goes out to the garden to check it out. A gardener who comes by tells him that his part-time job as a model has a bad reputation, so Conan decides to go talk to the two women who were models before Ran, Aiyo Nagahata and Machiko Nogami. They both say that someone pushed them and that they had seen Kasuga before that. After hearing the story from Machiko, Conan rushes to contact Kogoro and...
1033	34	"Taiko Meijin's Shogi Board (Opening Move)"; Transliteration: "Taikō Meijin no Shōgi-ban (Shote-hen)" (Japanese: 太閤名人の将棋盤（初手編）)	Kōichirō Kuroda Yōsuke Fujino	N/A	January 8, 2022	–
On his way out of school, while the Detective Boys were talking about soccer, Conan was thinking about something else in the news. Nishikido, a shogi player who had disappeared in the wake of the eight-figure tournament, had been murdered and found dead. At the scene, there was a shogi board with one of its legs cut off. Conan and his friends are discussing the origin of the word "Yayakucho" from an article about the case that Conan had seen when Hideyoshi Haneda appears. Hideyoshi tells them that when he played against Nishikido, "I was not particularly impressed with him, but one time he came back from the bathroom and played a move that was so strange that it surprised me. When the Detective Boys see Hideyoshi looking clean-shaven and refreshed, they assume he has a date with his girlfriend Yumi, but Hideyoshi denies the date and leaves, saying he is meeting someone important. Then Yumi appears. Yumi had been following Hideyoshi because she was suspicious that he was getting dressed up and sneaking out more often. Conan is taken away by Yumi, who says, "It's harder to be noticed when you're with children. As Conan and Yumi continue to follow him, they see Hideyoshi buying a lot of donuts at a donut shop and talking to two women in a friendly manner. Conan and Yumi are so angry that they run out and tell Yumi that Hideyoshi was having a Shogi study session. The two women were Mizuna Katsumata and Shoko Uryu, both professional women's chess players. Kosuke Hishinuma, a professional shogi player, joins them and heads to the apartment where another participant, Yasuaki Genda, is waiting. However, Genda is found dead there. Beside him, there is a shogi board with a leg cut off.
1034	35	"Taiko Meijin's Shogi Board (Brilliant Move)"; Transliteration: "Taikō Meijin no Shōgi-ban (Myōshu-hen)" (Japanese: 太閤名人の将棋盤（妙手編）)	Sumito Sasaki	N/A	January 15, 2022	–
Conan and Yumi visit the apartment where Hideyoshi is holding a Shogi study group, and find one of the participants, Yasuaki Genda, murdered there. A Shogi board with two legs cut off was found next to him. The room was unlocked, and the three claim that someone had broken in while the other participants, Mizuna Katsumata, Sachiko Uryu, and Kosuke Hishinuma, were out shopping. Hishinuma bought a lukewarm but still warm cup of coffee, Mizuna bought a loaf of bread, and Shoko bought a cold ice cream. The state of the items purchased by the three of them was such that they could claim that they had just bought them, thus establishing their alibi. The police begin to consider the possibility of a series of murders, since a shogi board with one leg cut off was left at the scene of the recent case where the missing player, Kimiharu Nishikido, was found dead. From the time of the mass media release, it seemed unlikely that a copycat was involved. When I asked him about it, he told me that Genda was acquainted with Nishikido, and that the study group had originally consisted of Genda, Nishikido, Yuhei Kishimoto, and Kinji Uryu. Kinji was Shoko's brother and Mizuna's boyfriend, but he took his own life. The reason for his death is unknown, and Kishimoto, who had been looking up to Kinji, has been depressed ever since. When the study group was short of members, the three of them were called upon to join. When they peered out of the window to check on Kishimoto's home, they could see if there was smoke in the area.
1035	36	"Taiko Meijin's Shogi Board (Checkmate)"; Transliteration: "Taikō Meijin no Shōgi-ban (Ōte-hen)" (Japanese: 太閤名人の将棋盤（王手編）)	Akira Yoshimura	N/A	January 22, 2022	–
Conan and Yumi visit the apartment where Hideyoshi is holding a Shogi study group, and find one of the participants, Yasuaki Genda, murdered there. A Shogi board with two legs cut off was found next to him. In addition, the house of Yuhei Kishimoto, who was also a participant in the study group, burns down and his body is found. There was a Shogi board with three legs cut off. Meanwhile, criminals kidnap Hideyoshi. He noticed something in the kitchen when Genda's body was found and went to see the murderer to encourage him to turn himself in. Conan contacts Akai at the Kudo residence and joins him. With Yusaku's advice, Conan gets an idea of the culprit, but the person has recently moved and is wary of calling, so he can't get the address. Hideyoshi's phone is also unreachable, and it seems that he didn't have his phone with the contact information of his close friends in case the culprit caught him. In the meantime, Akai starts to contact somewhere. It was a dedicated phone for Akai and Hideyoshi to talk in private. Hideyoshi notices the contact, connects the call, and starts playing blindfolded Shogi with the criminal. Conan and Akai go to Hideyoshi's rescue based on the GPS information on the phone.
1036	37	"Whiteout (Part One)"; Transliteration: "Howaito Auto (Zenpen)" (Japanese: ホワイトアウト（前編）)	Masahiro Takada	Akatsuki Yamatoya	January 29, 2022	–
Conan, Ayumi, Mitsuhiko, and Motota are taken by Dr. Agasa to a snowy winter mountain for skiing. Conan, Ayumi, Mitsuhiko, and Motota find a car stuck on the road to the ski resort and help get it out, which leads them to meet Kengo Ishibashi, the president of a pharmaceutical company, and Takeru Yokoyama, a doctor. They were apparently on their way to do some sports hunting. After exchanging contact information, Conan, and his friends part ways, but a suspicious car chases after them.
1037	38	"Whiteout (Part Two)"; Transliteration: "Howaito Auto (Kōhen)" (Japanese: ホワイトアウト（後編）)	Minoru Tozawa	Akatsuki Yamatoya	February 5, 2022	–
Ayumi witnesses the murder of Takeru Yokoyama, a doctor, by Kengo Ishibashi, the president of a pharmaceutical company, at a ski resort. Conan, Ayumi, Mitsuhiko, and Motota are chased by the murderer, Ishibashi, when he notices them. Conan, Ayumi, Mitsuhiko, and Motota are chased by Ishibashi, but they go off course and end up wandering on a snowy road, where Ishibashi's two friends are waiting for them. They use a sled to dodge the pursuers, but Ishibashi joins them and they start looking for Conan and his friends again. When Conan reaches the cabin and attempts to contact the outside world, he gets his phone and is connected to Dr. Agasa.
1038	39	"Police Academy Arc Wild Police Story CASE. Date Wataru"; Transliteration: "Keisatsu Gakkō-hen Wairudo Porīsu Sutōrī Kēsu. Date Wataru" (Japanese: 警察学校編 Wild Police Story CASE.伊達航)	Yasuichirō Yamamoto	N/A	March 12, 2022	–
Furuya and Date fought in an arresting technique class. Date won and asked the defeated Furuya, "Why didn't you exploit your own weakness?" He said, "If you are not stronger than anyone else, you will not be able to carry out justice." Later that night, Furuya was alone in bed thinking about Date's words. Morobushi comes to Furuya's room and tells him that he is going out. Morofushi comes to Furuya's room and asks, "Is there anything you want me to buy for you?" But after a while, he remembered that he was out of toothpaste. He leaves the room to ask for it, but Morobushi, Hagiwara, and Matsuda are already gone, so he decides to go to the convenience store by himself. When Furuya went outside, he found Date there and started talking about past events with his father.
1039	40	"The Flying Jack-o'-lantern"; Transliteration: "Soratobu Harowin Kabocha" (Japanese: 空飛ぶハロウィンカボチャ)	Tsurumi Mukaiyama	Takahiro Ōkura	April 16, 2022	–
Conan Edogawa visits Cafe Poirot because Ran and Kogoro Mouri have gone out. There, Azusa Enomoto, a waitress, is making jack-o'-lanterns for Halloween. While helping her, Conan learns that a "pumpkin ghost" has recently been discovered and is the talk of the town. A woman, Tamie Kono, comes in in a great hurry, followed by Tomomi Koriyama and Gouji Mizunuma. The three live next door to each other. They were making jack-o'-lanterns for the "Yonehana-cho Shopping Street Halloween Pumpkin Contest" with pumpkins given by Azusa, but the pumpkins were stolen. Tamie's, the winner of the contest three times in a row, is still understandable, but there is no reason for the other two to be stolen. Conan and Azusa go to check where each of them had left their pumpkins and the condition of the site.

== Home media release ==
Shogakukan/Being/B Zone (Japan, Region 2 DVD)
Volume	Episodes^{Jp.}	Release date	Ref.
Volume 1	1000–1002, 1006	February 24, 2023	
Volume 2	1003–1005, 1009	April 21, 2023	
Volume 3	1007–1008, 1010, 1013	June 23, 2023	
Volume 4	1011–1012, 1014–1015	August 25, 2023	
Volume 5	1016–1017, 1021–1022	October 27, 2023	
Volume 6	1018–1020, 1023	February 23, 2024	
Volume 7	1024–1027	April 19, 2024	
Volume 8	1028–1031	June 21, 2024	
Volume 9	1032–1035	August 23, 2024	
Volume 10	1036–1039	October 25, 2024	
