= Case Closed season 30 =

Season of television series

Case Closed
- Season 30
- The cover of the first DVD compilation for season thirty of Detective Conan released by Shogakukan
- No. of episodes: 40

Release
- Original network: NNS (ytv)
- Original release: November 23, 2019 – February 27, 2021

Season chronology
- ← Previous; Season 29 Next → Season 31

The thirtieth season of the Case Closed anime was directed by Yasuichirō Yamamoto and Nobuharu Kamanaka (since episode 975), and produced by TMS Entertainment and Yomiuri Telecasting Corporation. The series is based on Gosho Aoyama's Case Closed manga series. In Japan, the series is titled Meitantei Conan (名探偵コナン, lit. Great Detective Conan, officially translated as Detective Conan) but was changed due to legal issues with the title Detective Conan. The series focuses on the adventures of teenage detective Shinichi Kudo who was turned into a child by a poison called APTX 4869, but continues working as a detective under the alias Conan Edogawa.

The episodes use seven pieces of theme music: three openings and four endings. The first opening theme is ANSWER by Only this time used until episode 964. The first ending theme is Sissy Sky by Airi Miyakawa used until episode 964. The second opening theme is Makka na Lip (真っ赤なLip; lit. "Bright Red Lips") by WANDS used for episodes 965 – 982. The second ending theme is Sukoshi Zutsu Sukoshi Zutsu (少しづつ 少しづつ; lit. "Little by Little, Little by Little") by SARD UNDERGROUND used for episodes 965 – 976. The third opening theme is JUST BELIEVE YOU by all at once used for episodes 983 – 999. The third ending theme is Hoshiai (星合; lit. "Star-crossed") by all at once used for episodes 977 – episode 992. The fourth ending theme is Reboot by Airi Miyakawa used for episodes 993 – 999.

The season initially ran from November 23, 2019, through February 27, 2021, on Nippon Television Network System in Japan. The season was later collected and released in ten DVD compilations by Shogakukan between February 25, 2022, and November 25, 2022, in Japan. Crunchyroll began simulcasting the series in October 2014, starting with episode 754. In February 2023, episodes of the anime appeared on Tubi with an English dub, starting at episode 965. This is the first time since 2010 that any episodes of the main anime series have been dubbed and released in English.

== Episode list ==
No. overall	No. in season	Title	Directed by	Written by	Original release date	English release date
960	1	"Miss Lonely and the Detective Boys"; Transliteration: "Mizu Ronrī to Tantei-dan" (Japanese: 未亡人と探偵団)	Kōichirō Kuroda	Yūki Nōtsuka	November 23, 2019	–
Dr. Agasa takes the Detective Boys to a park where they become friends with Tomoko Komori, a recent widow. The kids meet another person, Kohei Kajiki, and they introduce him to Tomoko, whom they hit it off well. Tomoko and Kohei drink wine for a while but a drunk Kohei goes to get his cellphone. He stumbles down and falls to his death. Conan investigates finds clues that point to foul play rather than an accident. A contact lenses is missing from Kohei's eye. Using Dr. Agasa's voice, Conan reveals that Tomoko planned Kohei's death. She knew Kohei liked children and used the Detective Boys as an excuse to get close to him. Tomoko weakened the support beam beforehand and poured water on the ground then placed Kohei's cellphone on top to make it look like his phone was floating above the ground. Disoriented and drunk, Kohei would fall to the ground whilst reaching for his phone. As evidence, her foundation, that she wiped with her handkerchief, can be found on Kohei's face when she removed his contact lenses and on the phone she used to call Kohei. Genta finds a shrine in Tomoko's room right as Tomoko disturbingly blames law enforcement for ruining her "masterful performance." Tomoko reveals she hates kids and was using the Detective Boys to get close to her victim. Her evil nature is shown as it is believed that Tomoko murdered her previous husbands the same way, collecting their rings as mementos. If true, that would make her a psychotic serial killer. While the kids are left heartbroken, no motive is provided as Takagi and Megure take Tomoko into custody.
961	2	"The Glamping Mystery"; Transliteration: "Guranpingu Kai Jiken" (Japanese: グランピング怪事件)	Mayo Nozaki	Akatsuki Yamatoya	November 30, 2019	–
Conan, Ran, and Sonoko come to a luxurious camp facility to enjoy the camp's glamping, which combines elegance and comfort. At the facility, company president Keidai Tozaki, his wife Kyoko Tozaki, make-up Mika Miura, and chef Hiroshi Tanabe are photographed in front of a gorgeous BBQ. I was taking a picture. At night, when Conan and his friends are relaxing in front of the bonfire, employees scream from the square. Tosaki's body was lit up in the plaza and emerged in the dark.
962	3	"Mori Kogoro's Grand Lecture (Part One)"; Transliteration: "Mōri Kogorō Dai Kōenkai (Zenpen)" (Japanese: 毛利小五郎大講演会（前編）)	Masahiro Takada	Jun'ichi Miyashita	December 7, 2019	–
Kogoro, Conan, and Ran meet with lawyer Eva Kaden for a meeting. Kogoro's lecture to commemorate the renewal of HISHIDA Hall to be held tomorrow. Eri will participate in the talk event in the second half. On her way home, Eri drops part of the file and Conan helps her pick it up. The file was a newspaper article about the murder of a university professor. The next day, when Kogoro before the lecture was drinking wine to boost the economy, the owner of the hall, Junko Hishida, and the manager, Yusaku Ujimori, came to the dressing room to greet him.
963	4	"Mori Kogoro's Grand Lecture (Part Two)"; Transliteration: "Mōri Kogorō Dai Kōenkai (Chūhen)" (Japanese: 毛利小五郎大講演会（中編）)	Minoru Tozawa	Jun'ichi Miyashita	December 14, 2019	–
An incident occurs at the venue where Kogoro's lecture is held. Inokoshi, an actor who was scheduled to participate in the talk event, was killed by someone in a closed dressing room. Kogoro infers that the former manager, Cold Spring, is the culprit, and reveals a closed-room trick using a stick. However, the suspect's cold spring confessed to a completely different murder case. It was Junko, the owner, who used a cane to push the cold spring down the emergency stairs. The tip of the cane of the cold spring matches the nape of his body. Reizumi states that Junko couldn't forgive him for neglecting his predecessor's way.
964	5	"Mori Kogoro's Grand Lecture (Part Three)"; Transliteration: "Mōri Kogorō Dai Kōenkai (Kōhen)" (Japanese: 毛利小五郎大講演会（後編）)	Akira Yoshimura Kōichirō Kuroda	Jun'ichi Miyashita	December 21, 2019	–
Two incidents occur at the venue where Kogoro's lecture is held. Former manager Reizumi kills Junko, the owner. It was Tsukinoki, the president of the security company, who killed the actor Inokoshi. Mei of the staff who found out the closed room trick of Tsukinoki and the trick that shifted the crime time and even found the evidence of the criminal. Conan can't hide her surprise when she sees Mei's reasoning power. After this, Kogoro's lecture will begin at HISHIDA Hall. The first part where Kogoro talks about the secrets of a famous detective is completed successfully. Eva Kaden, a lawyer who participates in the talk event of the second part, also comes to the venue.
965	6	"Kaiju Gomera VS Kamen Yaiba (Prologue)"; Transliteration: "Dai Kaijū Gomera Bāsasu Kamen Yaibā (Jo)" (Japanese: 大怪獣ゴメラvs仮面ヤイバー（序）)	Hiroaki Takagi	Takahiro Ōkura	January 4, 2020	February 8, 2023
Conan and his friends are invited to the production presentation of the new office building completion commemorative movie "Big Monster Gomera vs Kamen Yaiba" and come to Nissho TV in Osaka. During the production announcement, an accident occurred in which a talented producer Yonekura was killed by being laid under a huge monster figure in a warehouse. The rope that supported the figure was cut with a knife, and Inspector Otaki of the Osaka Prefectural Police proceeded with the investigation as an incident, not as an accident. The suspects are narrowed down to three producers, Kosugi, Mihara, and Takauchi, who are subordinates of Yonekura.
966	7	"Kaiju Gomera VS Kamen Yaiba (Interlude)"; Transliteration: "Dai Kaijū Gomera Bāsasu Kamen Yaibā (Ha)" (Japanese: 大怪獣ゴメラvs仮面ヤイバー（破）)	Nobuharu Kamanaka	Takahiro Ōkura	January 11, 2020	February 8, 2023
Takauchi and Mihara, who killed the talented producer Yonekura, steal Yonekura's car and escape, but the car explodes shortly thereafter. Takauchi, who was driving, died instantly. Kyoto Prefectural Police Fumimaro Ayanokoji investigates an accident in which screenwriter Onda fell off a cliff with his car. Ayakoji finds out that Onda and Yonekura had contact in the past, and it becomes clear that Yonekura was investigating Onda's accident. After this, another explosion occurred and new victims appeared. And the relevance of the incident gradually becomes apparent ...
967	8	"Kaiju Gomera VS Kamen Yaiba (Climax)"; Transliteration: "Dai Kaijū Gomera Bāsasu Kamen Yaibā (Kyū)" (Japanese: 大怪獣ゴメラvs仮面ヤイバー（急）)	Minoru Tozawa	Takahiro Ōkura	January 18, 2020	February 8, 2023
The murder of a talented producer Yonekura at the new office building of Nissho TV in Osaka is about to unfold. The criminal is caught, but it turns out that a bomb was set on Yonekura's car and was targeted by another person. A bomb was also set on the car of Onda, a scriptwriter who died in an accident in Kyoto. Meanwhile, there was an explosion in the warehouse, and Suemura of the Nissho movie company was killed. This is a series of bombing murders by the same offender. Yonekura, Onda, and Suemura turned out to be friends who once participated in an independent film screening. And it becomes clear that at that time, the three were bullying a friend named Ishizawa.
968	9	"Kaiju Gomera VS Kamen Yaiba (Finale)"; Transliteration: "Dai Kaijū Gomera Bāsasu Kamen Yaibā (Ketsu)" (Japanese: 大怪獣ゴメラvs仮面ヤイバー（結）)	Yasuichirō Yamamoto	Takahiro Ōkura	January 25, 2020	February 8, 2023
The murder of a talented producer Yonekura at the new office building of Nissho TV in Osaka is about to unfold. The criminal is caught, but it turns out that a bomb was set on Yonekura's car and was targeted by another person. A bomb was also Set on the car of Onda, a scriptwriter who died in an accident in Kyoto. Meanwhile, there was an explosion in the warehouse, and Suemura of the Nissho movie company was killed. This is a series of bombing murders by the same offender. Onda and Suemura turned out to be friends who once participated in an independent film screening. And it becomes clear that at that time, the three were bullying a friend named Ishizawa.
969	10	"The Young Kaga Lady's Mystery Tour (Part One)"; Transliteration: "Kaga Reijō Misuterī Tsuā (Zenpen)" (Japanese: 加賀令嬢ミステリーツアー（前編）)	Masahiro Takada	Yūki Nōtsuka	February 15, 2020	February 8, 2023
Conan, Ran, and Kogoro get involved in a kidnapping case in Kanazawa, a travel destination. However, it was a self-made performance of the victim, a former Yuzen writer, Manabu Saikawa. It was only a matter of time before the culprit was identified and arrested, but a new incident occurred where Soichi Hayashi, the president of Kimonoya, was attacked. From motivation and eyewitness testimony, Gaku becomes a leading suspect ...!?
970	11	"The Young Kaga Lady's Mystery Tour (Part Two)"; Transliteration: "Kaga Reijō Misuterī Tsuā (Kōhen)" (Japanese: 加賀令嬢ミステリーツアー（後編）)	Kōichirō Kuroda	Yūki Nōtsuka	February 22, 2020	February 8, 2023
Conan Edogawa came to Kanazawa with Ran Mouri and Kogoro Mouri. He meets a woman named Mari Hayashi, who carries a ransom there, and is involved in a kidnapping case. However, this kidnapping case was a self-made performance by former Yuzen writer Saigawa Manabu, who was thought to be the victim. The criminal was also known, and it seemed that the case had been resolved.
971	12	"MPD Transportation Department (Part One)"; Transliteration: "Tāgetto wa Keishichō Kōtsūbu (Ichi)" (Japanese: 標的は警視庁交通部（一）)	Minoru Tozawa	N/A	March 7, 2020	February 8, 2023
A mysterious man reminisces about a deceased woman named Aiko while staring at her last text message, blaming a group of people for her death and bending 100 yen coins with a hammer. The next day, Naeko Miike also thinks about her and Chiba when they were kids. She runs into Lieutenant Shiori Yagi of the Metropolitan Traffic police who invites her to go singing at the local karaoke lounge along with another traffic officer, Touko Momosaki, who is a skilled fighter. After singing for some time, the three ladies leave. Touko is approached by the same individual from the opening scene asking for help after claiming to have heard a girl scream at a nearby park. When Touko investigates, the man attacks her but fails, then stuns and brutally bludgeons her to death with a metal bat. The discovery of her body launches an investigation where Conan points out that Touko was pointing in the direction of a swing set next to a "no parking" sign. Shiori and Naeko are called to for interrogation, but when Shiori sees the swing set, she remembers something, but leaves without saying anything.
972	13	"MPD Transportation Department (Part Two)"; Transliteration: "Tāgetto wa Keishichō Kōtsūbu (Ni)" (Japanese: 標的は警視庁交通部（二）)	Akira Yoshimura	N/A	March 14, 2020	February 8, 2023
The investigation into Touko's murder continues as Shiori leaves the crime scene. When seeing who had resented Touko, three traffic violators have become suspects: Kengo Aono, who was using his phone while driving and didn't have a license, Manji Akamine because he wasn't wearing a helmet while riding his motorcycle, and Yuzo Shiroyama for driving a vehicle with an expired inspection on top of not wearing his seat belt. All three suspects were in a rush and were arrested for attempting to flee before being issued a ticket for their infractions. That evening, Shiori arrives at a location to confront the perpetrator. She tries to convince the killer to surrender but he taunts and stuns her before being thrown out the window. Near death, Shiori texts "7155" on her phone and dies, which the killer crushes, leaving behind another bent 100 yen coin. Her body is discovered and, like Touko, she was facing a "no parking" sign. Commissioner Kuruda concludes that a serial killer, who is standing in the crowd, is on the loose targeting policewomen. While alone on a neighborhood street, Yumi helps with the investigation, oblivious that she is being stalked.
973	14	"MPD Transportation Department (Part Three)"; Transliteration: "Tāgetto wa Keishichō Kōtsūbu (San)" (Japanese: 標的は警視庁交通部（三）)	Nobuharu Kamanaka	N/A	March 21, 2020	February 8, 2023
Sato, Chiba, and Shiratori learn from a neighborhood citizen that a suicide occurred one week prior from the same building Shiori was thrown from. A scream nearby attracts them where they find Yumi, who they thought to have been killed, sleeping on the ground. Yumi determines that Shiori was facing a "no parking" sign before she died. The three suspects: Kengo Aono, Manji Akamine, and Yuzo Shiroyama are mentioned again but no arrested are made. While patrolling the streets, Yumi is stalked by the killer. A drunk man, who has nothing to do with the murders, attacks her but is stopped by Subaru. Conan gets involved and investigates with Chiba. Across town, the killer lures Naeko into his car and Chiba receives a phone call from her where Naeko is heard being beaten. She taps a message but the killer hangs up the phone and prepares to murder her.
974	15	"MPD Transportation Department (Part Four)"; Transliteration: "Tāgetto wa Keishichō Kōtsūbu (Yon)" (Japanese: 標的は警視庁交通部（四）)	Yorifusa Yamaguchi	N/A	March 28, 2020	February 8, 2023
After remembering that Japan's signage system is based from England's, Conan concludes that Kengo Aono is the serial murderer. Touko and Shiori's dying message was in fact the "no parking" sign. Blue in Japanese is "ao", and no parking signs are a "no" layered on top of a blue sign. When combined, they form "Aono." The "7751" on Shiori's phone meant law article 71, section 5-5, prohibiting any persons using or looking at their mobile devices whilst operating a vehicle. Kengo is the only suspect out of the three who broke such laws. Conan also deciphers Naeko's message, indicating she's being held at a planetarium. As true to Conan's deduction, Kengo unmasks himself and reveals that Aiko, the woman her killed herself, was his girlfriend. Touko and Shiori pulled him over, thereby stopping him from saving Aiko. Aiko left a message for Kengo before she died, causing him to break down in tears. Chiba accidentally sets Kengo's trap but is saved by Naeko, who he recognizes as his childhood friend. Kengo is arrested for the murders.
975	16	"The Secret of the Search for His Wife"; Transliteration: "Tsuma Sagashi no Himitsu" (Japanese: 妻探しの秘密)	Kōichirō Kuroda	Asami Ishikawa	July 4, 2020	February 15, 2023
Ran and Conan run into a man searching for his wife. Along with Kogoro, they interrogate the neighbourhood only to unveil the fact that the wife had been murdered. Conan looks for clues in the garden where the corpse was buried.
976	17	"Follow Them! Detective Taxi"; Transliteration: "Tsuiseki! Tantei Takushī" (Japanese: 追跡！探偵タクシー)	Minoru Tozawa	Yoshio Urasawa	July 18, 2020	February 15, 2023
Conan and Kogoro search for a lost armadillo in the fish market. Their cab driver, who happens to be a Kogoro fan, takes them to the local 'Chimney Ghost' festival. Conan takes it upon himself to foil a theft attempt on the festival collection money.
977	18	"The Broken Fishbowl"; Transliteration: "Wareta Kingyobachi" (Japanese: 割れた金魚鉢)	Akira Yoshimura	Kōshirō Mikami	August 1, 2020	February 15, 2023
Kogoro was asked by a president of an investment company to provide bodyguards. When I went to hear the story with Conan, the company was a scam investing company that was conducting a fraudulent commercial method of making money by buying and selling rare goldfish. In front of Conan, the victims squeeze their complaints against the president. Some people even say, "I'll kill you." Still, he got angry at the president, who was eager to say, "The customers who pushed his desires were bad", and Kogoro refused his request and tried to return. But while you were waiting for the bus to return, did the company scream? When Conan and Kogoro rushed together, the president was killed!
978	19	"The Case On the Opposite Shore"; Transliteration: "Taigan no Jiken" (Japanese: 対岸の事件)	Yasuichirō Yamamoto Yorifusa Yamaguchi	Akatsuki Yamatoya	August 15, 2020	February 15, 2023
Conan and Detective Boys who came to the park for bird watching start observing humans on the other side of the river with binoculars to "improve reasoning power". While playing with a profession, He finds Detective Takagi in disguise staking out. Apparently, cash is being handed over in the kidnapping case. He tries to go to the other side, but it takes time to move, so he keeps watching. After that, the criminal appears in the handing over the cash and is secured, but Conan gets caught. The criminal was not a kidnapping case, but a victim of a special scam. The Detective Boys begin observing the person who seems to be the criminal.
979	20	"Leading a Detective Around By the Nose"; Transliteration: "Tantei o Hikizurimawasu" (Japanese: 探偵を引きずり回す)	Hiroaki Takagi	Nobuo Ōgizawa	August 29, 2020	February 15, 2023
A woman named Kanae who says "an important brooch was stolen" comes to Kogoro. Kanae said from the criminal, "I kept the treasure brooch. If you want me to return it, come to the other world. It's a park. However, if you notify the police, the treasure will be disposed of immediately." Kogoro and Kanae headed to the designated park and found a new letter from the clock that was there. The text and the next place were specified, as if they were watching over their actions. Kogoro thinks that Kanae is being targeted for life because of the word "to that world" in the letter and the danger that often occurs. Kogoro, who had been moved from place to place one after another, remembered a certain incident that he solved two years ago.
980	21	"An Encouragement of the Perfect Crime"; Transliteration: "Kanzen Hanzai no Susume" (Japanese: 完全犯罪のススメ)	Kōichirō Kuroda	Akatsuki Yamatoya	September 5, 2020	February 15, 2023
Detective Takagi and Detective Sato come to the detective agency Kogoro Mouri. "Recently, a number of strange incidents have occurred", the two show Kogoro the materials of the incident. The content of the case was disjointed with marriage fraud, bank murder, burglary ... However, these cases have something in common, and the "case plot" is always included in the evidence. According to the statements of the criminals caught, the "crime adviser" sold the crime plan. The two people who found their whereabouts set a white arrow on Kogoro as an advisor on the police side. Hamanaka, a crime advisor who claims to be a "Modern Moriarity," admits what he has done by saying he is "selling plots of crime novels" and is arrested for abetting crime. Pushed by Detective Sato's aggression, Hamanaka begins to talk about the case he is involved in, but only the suspect in the plot "Takashi Ishigami Review Plan" is missing.
981	22	"Welcome to Bocchan Restaurant (Part One)"; Transliteration: "Botchantei e Yōkoso (Zenpen)" (Japanese: 坊っちゃん亭へようこそ（前編）)	Mayo Nozaki	Nobuo Ōgizawa	September 19, 2020	February 15, 2023
Conan Detective Boys discover a wounded cat assaulted by someone in a park. They search for the culprit from the bloodstains and fibers left on the cat's claws. On the other hand, at a restaurant called "Bocchan", the customer service chief was found dead. His coat looks a lot like the fibers left on the cat's claws ...
982	23	"Welcome to Bocchan Restaurant (Part Two)"; Transliteration: "Botchantei e Yōkoso (Kōhen)" (Japanese: 坊っちゃん亭へようこそ（後編）)	Minoru Tozawa	Nobuo Ōgizawa	September 26, 2020	February 15, 2023
On the day Conan and Detective Boys protected the injured cat, the chief customer service officer, "Uranari," was found dead in the restaurant "Bocchan," which reproduced Natsume Soseki's novel "Bocchan." As the police investigation progresses, even the manager "red shirt", who was thought to be a leading candidate for the criminal will be found dead the next day. The police think it was a suicide after they thought they couldn't escape. However, Conan, who noticed that the body of Uranari had been moved, discovers that it was a disguise to make the "red shirt" that lived on the premises look suspicious. At Ayumi's suggestion, "We want to find the criminal who did something terrible to the cat!", The Detective Boys investigate the criminal, stopping Conan from trying to tell Kogoro and Inspector Megure.
983	24	"Kid vs. Komei the Targeted Lips (Part One)"; Transliteration: "Kiddo Bāsasu Kōmei Nerawareta Kuchibiru (Zenpen)" (Japanese: キッドVS高明 狙われた唇（前編）)	Nobuharu Kamanaka	N/A	October 3, 2020	February 15, 2023
Heiji and Kazuha were on their way to Tokyo by Shinkansen to go to the Suzuki Museum with Conan and his friends. At the Suzuki Museum, the world's largest conk pearl "Fairy Lip" is on display, and it seems that the Phantom Thief Kid is aiming for this. Conan and his friends learn about it in Jirokichi Suzuki's challenge to Kid. The challenge letter said, "The jewels are ready to be seen from all directions." At the Suzuki Museum, "Fairy Lip" is in a room made of hard glass, placed in a huge icicle. Inspector Nakamori and Inspector Takaaki Morofushi of the Investigation Division 1 of the Nagano Prefectural Police Headquarters were there. On the other hand, the Phantom Thief Kid had already come to preview among the riot police and felt the presence of two high school detectives and a smart Inspector Komei was a threat. He hesitated to issue a notice, but a person appeared who complained that "the imitation was replaced with the genuine conch pearl ring that he had deposited and returned."
984	25	"Kid vs. Komei: The Targeted Lips (Part Two)"; Transliteration: "Kiddo Bāsasu Kōmei Nerawareta Kuchibiru (Kōhen)" (Japanese: キッドVS高明 狙われた唇（後編）)	Nobuharu Kamanaka	N/A	October 10, 2020	February 15, 2023
Conan, Ran, Kogoro, and Heiji, and Kazuha from Osaka come to the Suzuki Museum. Meanwhile, Kaito Kid, who had announced that he would steal the jewels on display at the museum and one of the world's largest conch pearls, "Fairy Lip", disguised himself as Kazuha and snuck into the exhibition room. Splendidly stealing the jewels......?
985	26	"The Two Faces (Part One)"; Transliteration: "Futatsu no Sugao (Zenpen)" (Japanese: 二つの素顔（前編）)	Masahiro Takada	Akatsuki Yamatoya	October 24, 2020	March 15, 2023
A woman named Masako Muto is coming to Mori Kogoro detective agency. Masako is said to be looking for her husband, Issei Muto, who disappeared. The other day, Masako, who was driving her car to have lunch with a friend, saw her husband in a town that was not his place of work. She called out to him when he broke up with a strange woman he was with, but for some reason he ran away and she lost sight of him. Conan and Kogoro visit her husband's company from a business card at home, which was a fictional office virtual office used by young entrepreneurs to start their own businesses with cheap funds. What on earth was her husband doing....?
986	27	"The Two Faces (Part Two)"; Transliteration: "Futatsu no Sugao (Kōhen)" (Japanese: 二つの素顔（後編）)	Minoru Tozawa	Akatsuki Yamatoya	October 31, 2020	March 15, 2023
Masako Muto's husband, Issei Muto, came to Mori Kogoro's office. His original job, which had disappeared, was not a trader but the president of a recycling company. Reflecting on the cover-up he had been hiding from Masako, it looked as if the Muto couple had settled safely. The next day, however, the detective agency was contacted that Issei had been found dead, and Conan and Kogoro hurried to the scene. The next day, however, the detective agency was contacted that Issei had been found dead, and Conan and Kogoro hurried to the scene.The estimated time of death of the body is between 2:00 and 6:00 today. The cause of death was not yet known, but the body was burned and charred, and all teeth had been removed to delay identification. Conan wonders if it was really true that he died. When he went to the company with Kogoro, he learned about the existence of Mr. Yoshihiko Nonaka, an employee who was absent without permission. Conan and Kogoro head to Nonaka's home, but he isn't there. Meanwhile, Conan noticed that he didn't have any belongings.
987	28	"The Company Dissolution Party" (Note: Party written as パーティ on the website but written as パーティー in the episode.); Transliteration: "Kaisha Kaisan Pāti" (Japanese: 会社解散パーティ)	Kōichirō Kuroda	Jun'ichi Iioka Chisato Matsuda	November 7, 2020	March 15, 2023
Conan, Ran, and Kogoro go to a restaurant to eat, and they come across employees of the mail-order site "Kureno" holding a "company dissolution party". There were President Jiro Kureno, Public Relations Junnosuke Toda, Product Management Eiji Koshimoto, Accounting Mayu Narita, and Web Designer Hiroo Kamijo. Kureno, who was given a bouquet with words of labor, collapses. The bouquet was filled with poisonous needles. Hearing the story, each participant had a motive for killing. Meanwhile, an employee testifies that he witnessed Echimoto crouching in front of the bouquet and doing something. Participants are gathered again, but Echimoto is not there ...
988	29	"The Feuding Girls"; Transliteration: "Igamiau Otome-tachi" (Japanese: いがみ合う乙女達)	Akira Yoshimura	Kōshirō Mikami	November 14, 2020	March 15, 2023
Conan, Ran, and Sonoko see models selling seal toys that can be operated with smartphones at the shopping mall where they came to shop. When the three of them were taking a break in the backyard, the models they saw earlier were there. The atmosphere of each of them was bad, especially the atmosphere of the two people who seemed to have competed in the commercial audition was the worst. Conan and his friends went back to shopping, but soon after they heard a scream ...
989	30	"The Case of Ayumi's Illustrated Diary"; Transliteration: "Ayumi no Enikki Jikenbo" (Japanese: 歩美の絵日記事件簿)	Yasuichirō Yamamoto	Akatsuki Yamatoya	December 5, 2020	March 15, 2023
A jewelry store in the Beika-cho shopping district on the school road of Conan and the Detective Boys. There is a decorative clock of which only five exist in the world. The residents are also curious. The watch is fully secure, but Conan notices that he is being targeted by thieves. The reason for this was "Ayumi's picture diary"...
990	31	"The Automatic Tragedy (Part One)"; Transliteration: "Ōtomatikku Higeki (Zenpen)" (Japanese: オートマティック悲劇（前編）)	Masahiro Takada	Nobuo Ōgizawa	December 12, 2020	March 15, 2023
A man's request to the Mouri detective agency was to find the culprit in the case where his father was murdered. In the case, a father who was alone at home was beaten in the head by someone and died, and about 300,000 yen in cash was stolen. The man said, "It's like I've let him die."
991	32	"The Automatic Tragedy (Part Two)"; Transliteration: "Ōtomatikku Higeki (Kōhen)" (Japanese: オートマティック悲劇（後編）)	Hiroaki Takagi	Nobuo Ōgizawa	December 19, 2020	March 15, 2023
While the client, Fusaya Oide, was running away from home, his father, who was alone at home, was robbed and killed. Conan and Kogoro find the person who stole it, but say "he didn't killed him." While the criminal image was hard to see, they headed to the scene again. Who really murdered his father.....
992	33	"Murder at the Townhouse Café" (Note: Townhouse written as 町屋 on the website but written as 町家 in the episode.); Transliteration: "Machiya Kafe de no Jiken" (Japanese: 町屋カフェでの事件)	Kōichirō Kuroda	Akatsuki Yamatoya	December 26, 2020	March 15, 2023
Conan comes to a machiya cafe that serves donuts that are reputed to look good on SNS with Ran and Sonoko. However, there are only a few clerks and suspicious customers in the store. After Conan and his friends spend a while at the cafe, suddenly they hear screams from the toilet. There was a manager who was hit in the head and collapsed.
993	34	"Kyogoku Makoto the Understudy (Part One)"; Transliteration: "Daiyaku Kyōgoku Makoto (Zenpen)" (Japanese: 代役・京極真（前編）)	Minoru Tozawa	N/A	January 9, 2021	March 15, 2023
Conan, Ran, Sonoko, Kyogoku, and Sera went to see a movie on their way home and encountered a man holding a pistol and taking a woman hostage. The woman was saved by the success of Kyogoku, but it was an actor who was shooting a TV drama. Kyogoku will take the place of the fainted actor. The shooting site where Conan and his friends came to visit was the closed schoolyard and the classroom on the fourth floor. There were many staff members such as director Shigematsu Tomioka and assistant director Daisaku Otori, actors Ayaya Tokuzono, Nanako Kamiaki, Hideka Yui of make-up, and Yota Hazuki of AD. Kyogoku begins practicing action with a detective. After the break, a camera was set in the schoolyard for Tokuzono to take a fall scene from the 4th floor. At that time, Tokuzo fell with a scream, and Kyogoku appeared from the window on the fourth floor ....
994	35	"Kyogoku Makoto the Understudy (Part Two)"; Transliteration: "Daiyaku Kyōgoku Makoto (Chūhen)" (Japanese: 代役・京極真（中編）)	Akira Yoshimura	N/A	January 16, 2021	March 15, 2023
Conan, Ran, Sonoko, and Sera come to visit the shooting site of the TV drama in which Kyogoku will take the place. However, there is an incident in which actor Ayaya Tokuzono falls from the 4th floor of the school building at the shooting site. The assistant director, Daisaku Otori, who seems to have noticed the criminal, seems to be secretly sending a message and planning something. The police started the investigation as murder because Tokuzono's smartphone was placed in an unnatural place outside the window on the fourth floor. On the other hand, Sera asked Conan and his friends about "Shinichi Kudo", "Isn't he taking strange medicine?" "When Shinichi is there, isn't Conan?"
995	36	"Kyogoku Makoto the Understudy (Part Three)"; Transliteration: "Daiyaku Kyōgoku Makoto (Kōhen)" (Japanese: 代役・京極真（後編）)	Mayo Nozaki	N/A	January 23, 2021	March 15, 2023
Tokuzono, an actor, falls at the drama filming site. Otori, an assistant director who may have noticed the perpetrator of the incident, is also murdered. He seems to have been poisoned, but no poison was detected in the drink he had until the last minute. Conan investigates while being at the mercy of Sera, who is obsessed with searching for "Shinichi Kudo".
996	37	"The Skilled Hawk Hides His Crimes"; Transliteration: "Nō Aru Taka wa Tsumi o Kakusu" (Japanese: 能ある鷹は罪を隠す)	Minoru Tozawa	Hiro Masaki	January 30, 2021	March 15, 2023
Conan, Ran, and Kogoro came to Takenoie, a traditional-style house cafe in a peaceful village. The "Okuhoriyama Festival" is being held there, but the inside of the store is empty. Conan and his friends enjoy experiencing puffed rice and falconry, but Genichi Takehara, the owner of the traditional-style house cafe who was hunting wild boar, appears injured after being shot by a gun and dies in front of them. Kogoro thinks it was due to an outburst when he was surprised by a hawk...
997	38	"Intrigue at Smile Village"; Transliteration: "Sumairu no Sato no Inbō" (Japanese: スマイルの里の陰謀)	Masahiro Takada	Yoshio Urasawa	February 13, 2021	March 15, 2023
Conan and the Detective Boys are invited to an ultra-high-end nursing care facility for the elderly. The grandmothers living there seem to have been fans since they saw the Detective Boys. Meanwhile, Conan and his friends, who felt uncomfortable with the chairman and the secretary-general, went to look into the chairman's office ...
998	39	"The Frying Pan of Hatred"; Transliteration: "Nikushimi no Furaipan" (Japanese: 憎しみのフライパン)	Kōichirō Kuroda	Kōshirō Mikami	February 20, 2021	March 15, 2023
Conan, Ran, and Kogoro came to the monitoring venue of a frying pan developed by a venture company. When the introduction by the employees is over, the president is called to say hello, but it does not come out easily. When Conan and others rushed to hear the screams from the president's office, the president who shed blood from his chest was lying down. While the police were investigating, an explosion occurred in the research building on the premises.
999	40	"Troublesome Kindness"; Transliteration: "Meiwaku na Shinsetsushin" (Japanese: 迷惑な親切心)	Ryūta Kawahara	Jun'ichi Iioka Chisato Matsuda	February 27, 2021	March 15, 2023
At the izakaya where Conan, Ran, and Kogoro are eating, there was a salaryman, Kusano, who proudly talked about the "kindness" he had been to. Yamanashi, a colleague who was listening to the story, smiled wryly because it was all thought to be "noisy". On the other hand, Kotani, who was sitting at the counter, was trembling with anger. Kotani was one of the "noisy" victims, and he was planning to be there and was listening to Kusano....

== Home media release ==
Shogakukan/Being (Japan, Region 2 DVD)
Volume	Episodes^{Jp.}	Release date	Ref.
Volume 1	960–961, 969–970	February 25, 2022	
Volume 2	962–964, 975	March 25, 2022	
Volume 3	965–968	April 22, 2022	
Volume 4	971–974	May 27, 2022	
Volume 5	976–979	June 24, 2022	
Volume 6	980–982, 987	July 22, 2022	
Volume 7	983–986	August 26, 2022	
Volume 8	988–991	September 23, 2022	
Volume 9	992–995	October 28, 2022	
Volume 10	996–999	November 25, 2022	
