= Who-ya Extended =

Japanese musical group

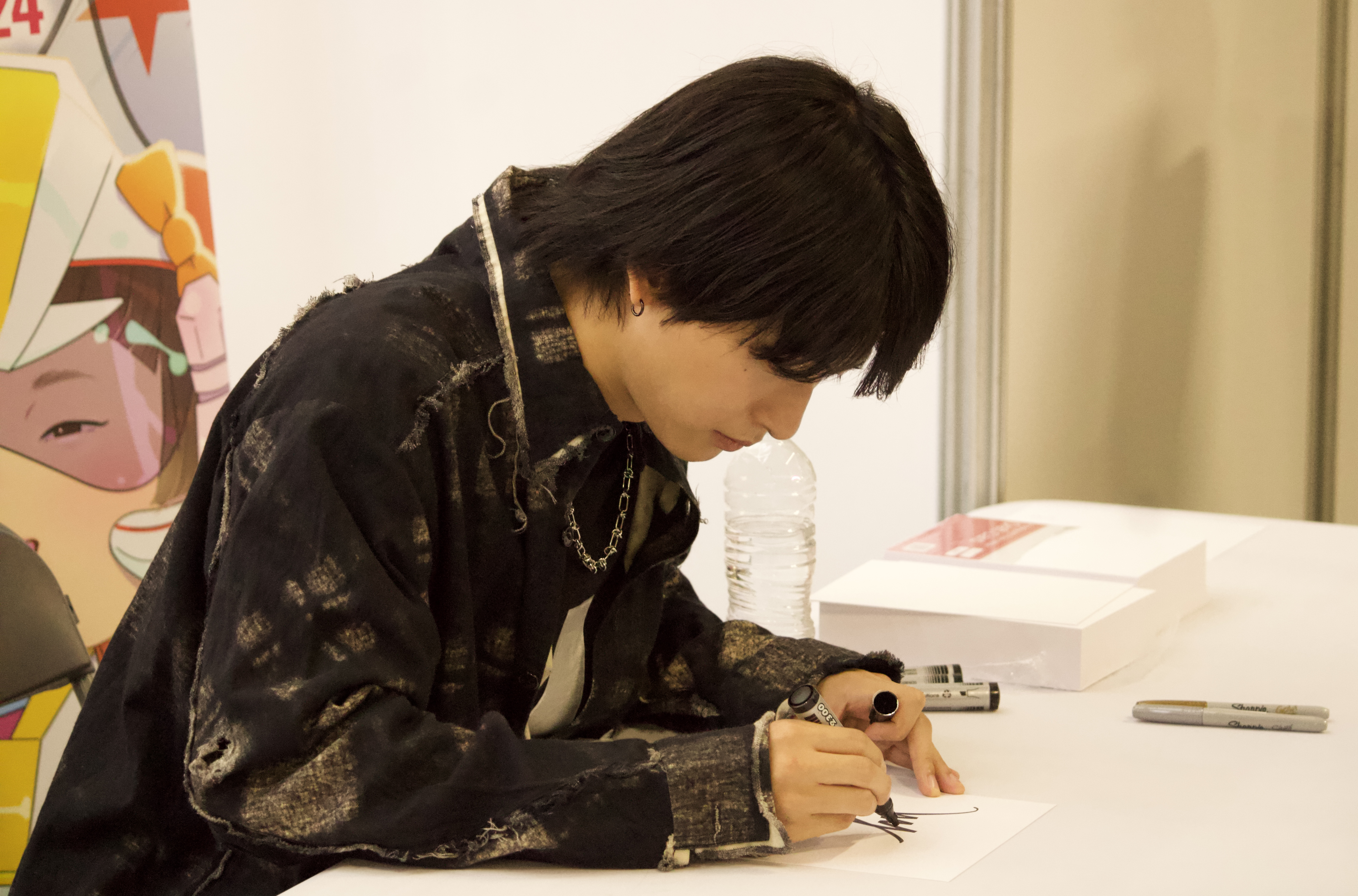
- Who-ya Extended signing autograph at Hyper Japan 2024, London.

Background information
- Origin: Japan
- Genres: Rock; pop rock
- Years active: 2019–present
- Labels: SME Records (2019–2022); Sacra Music (2022–present)
- Members: Who-ya
- Website: Official Website (Japanese Only)

YouTube information
- Channel: Who-ya Extended official YouTube channel
- Years active: 2019–present
- Genre: Music
- Subscribers: 66.5 thousand
- Views: 33.36 million
- Last updated: 27 July 2024

Who-ya Extended is a Japanese music group, signed to Sacra Music under Sony Music Entertainment Japan. The main member of the group is the vocalist Who-ya (who was 20-years-old when they debuted in 2019). Members other than Who-ya change depending on songs although they have core members.

== History ==
On November 27, 2019, the group debuted with the single "Q-vism" from SME Records. The song was used as the opening theme of the TV anime Psycho-Pass 3 which started broadcasting in the same month. The pre-released single on October 25 ranked No. 1 on the iTunes general chart, No. 1 in Amazon Digital Popularity Ranking, No. 1 in iTunes Anime Category, and ranked in the top 10 in Oricon weekly digital single rankings and so on.

On March 9, 2020, they digitally released "Synthetic Sympathy" which was the theme song for anime movie Psycho-Pass 3: First Inspector, started broadcasting in the same month. On April 15, the first album "wyxt." was released.

On January 3, 2021, for the first time they appeared publicly in the online festival "Sony Music Anime Songs Online Nippon Budokan" and performed "Q-vism" and "Synthetic Sympathy"

On February 17, they released their first EP Vivid Vice. The lead song "Vivid Vice" was pre-released on January 16 as the opening song for the 2nd cour of the anime Jujutsu Kaisen. The song recorded the 1st place on Oricon's daily ranking. They also released an acoustic version of the song on The First Take.

On April 2, 2021, they held their first studio live on TikTok's program "Next Fire".

In June 2021, it was announced that their new song "Icy Ivy" was selected as the opening song for the TV anime Night Head 2041, which began airing from July 14. The digital version of "Icy Ivy" was pre-released on July 15 and second EP Icy Ivy was released on August 11. Also, celebrating the new EP release, they held a special live in Tokyo on August 20, inviting 100 people who purchased the CD of new EP.

It has been announced that on November 10, 2021, they released their second full album WII. They held their first solo live on January 23, 2022.

On June 15, 2022 they released their third EP, A Shout of Triumph. The lead track, "A Shout of Triumph", was pre-released on June 2 and served as the ending song for the TV anime Build Divide -#FFFFFF (Code White)-.

== Member ==
Who-ya – Vocal, Lyrics, Composition

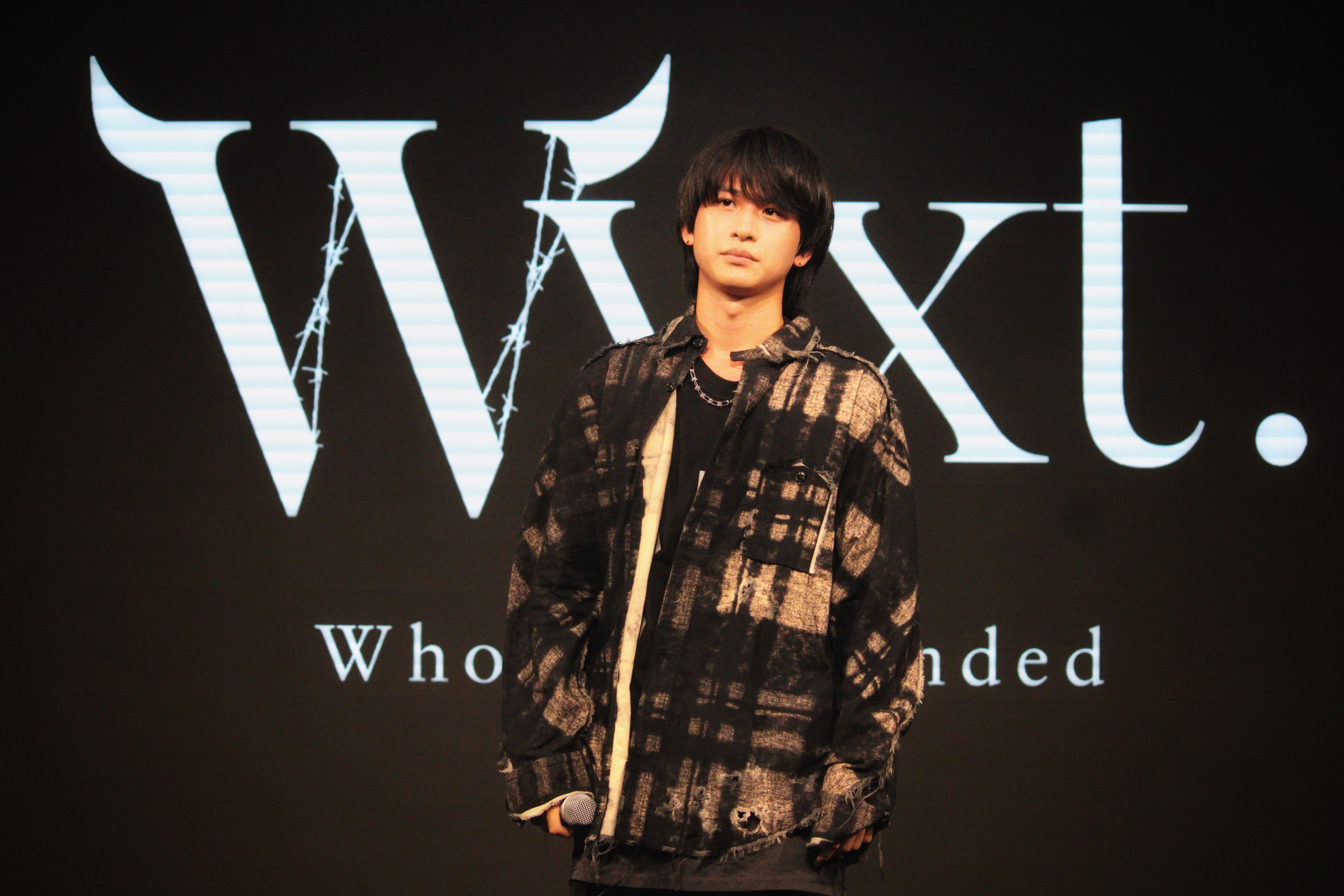
Who-ya Extended at Hyper Japan 2024, London.

- Who-ya was 20-year-old when they debuted.
- He started to listen to the music influenced by his parents, especially his mother who likes international rock-bands. He was especially influenced by Chester Bennington from Linkin Park.
- He was not a good singer until his primary school days.
- He started to play music when he was in the third year of the junior high school. At that time, his friends asked him to join the band as the vocalist for a school festival and there for the first time he sang in public. Then he was fascinated by the greatness and possibility of entertainment and started to hope to play in the bigger places, which is the reason why he became a musician. The biggest turning point for him was the moment when he met the current members in Who-ya Extended when he continued to play in a band in the high-school.
- His character is straightforward and stubborn. He likes to do things to make people happier.

== Discography ==
=== Studio albums ===
Title	Album details	Peak chart positions		
Title	Album details	JPN	JPN Comb.	JPN Hot
wyxt.	Released: April 15, 2020; Label: SME Records; Formats: CD, digital download, DVD, streaming; Track listing: 1. Synthetic Sympathy; 2. Killing My Fear; 3. Dogma-Agnostic; 4. ErroЯ CØDE; 5. Slight light life 6. Too late to know 7. ●REC ON; 8. G.O.A.T; 9. memorized.; 10. Q-vism; First-run Limited Edition DVD: 1. Q-vism MUSIC VIDEO; 2. Synthetic Sympathy MUSIC VIDEO; 3. Synthetic Sympathy MUSIC VIDEO (PSYCHO-PASS ver.); 4. "Psycho-Pass 3: First Inspector" Non-credit Opening Movie	37	37	19
WII	Released: November 10, 2021; Label: SME Records; Formats: Blu-ray, CD, digital download, streaming; Track listing CD: 1. WII -prologue-; 2. VIVID VICE; 3. Discord Dystopia; 4. Wander Wraith; 5. MESSY WORLD; 6. Growling Ghoul; 7. The master mind 8. Wasted Dawn; 9. Absolute 0; 10. Toumeina Hana; 11. Icy Ivy; 12. WII -epilogue-; First-run Limited Edition BD: 1. Wander Wraith MUSIC VIDEO; 2. Icy Ivy MUSIC VIDEO; 3. VIVID VICE MUSIC VIDEO; 4. VIVID VICE / THE FIRST TAKE; 5. VIVID VICE Acoustic version	46	—	32
"—" denotes releases that did not chart.

=== Extended plays ===
Title	Album details	Peak chart positions		
Title	Album details	JPN	JPN Comb.	JPN Hot
Vivid Vice	Released: February 17, 2021; Label: SME Records; Formats: CD, digital download, DVD, streaming; Track listing: 1. VIVID VICE; 2. The master mind 3. VIVID BANG; 4. Enough Is Enough; 5. VIVID VICE TV size（Only in the Limited Edition）; 6. VIVID VICE (Instrumental); Limited Edition: Special Anime Package for Digipak; Non-credit movie of opening song for the 2nd cool of the anime "Jujutsu Kaisen"; First-run Limited Edition: "VIVID VICE" MUSIC VIDEO DVD	7	11	12
Icy Ivy	Released: August 11, 2021; Label: SME Records; Formats: CD, digital download, DVD, streaming; Track listing: 1. Icy Ivy; 2. Growling Ghoul; 3. RAISE U UP; 4. Call My Name; 5. Icy Ivy TV size (Only in the Limited Edition); 6. Icy Ivy Instrumental; Limited Edition: Special Anime Package for Digipak; Non-credit movie of opening song for the TV anime "Might Head 2041" Special DVD; First-run Limited Edition: Icy Ivy MUSIC VIDEO DVD	—	—	53
A Shout of Triumph	Released: June 15, 2022; Label: SME Records; Formats: CD, digital download, DVD, streaming	—	—	75
"—" denotes releases that did not chart.

=== Singles ===
Title	Year	Peak chart positions		Album
Title	Year	JPN	JPN Comb.	Album
"Q-vism"	2019	41	48	wyxt.
"Prayer"	2023	—	—	Non-album singles
"Aufheben"	2025	—	—	Non-album singles
"Cru Out Cry Over"	2025	—	—	Non-album singles
"—" denotes releases that did not chart.

=== Digital singles ===
Title	Year	Peak chart positions			Album
Title	Year	JPN Comb.	JPN DL	JPN Hot	Album
"Q-vism"	2019	—	10	93	wyxt.
"Synthetic Sympathy"	2020	—	19	—	wyxt.
"ErroЯ CØde"	2020	—	—	—	wyxt.
"Vivid Vice"	2021	50	8	50	Vivid Vice
"Icy Ivy"	2021	—	—	—	Icy Ivy
"Icy Ivy (Coveted Eden MIX) - Sacra Chill Beats Singles"	2021	—	—	—	Non-album single
"Wander Wraith"	2021	—	—	—	WII
"A Shout of Triumph"	2022	—	—	—	A Shout of Triumph
"Repentance Dance"	2023	—	—	—	Non-album singles
"Gimme Your Tears"	2023	—	—	—	Non-album singles
"Die for a Life"	2023	—	—	—	Non-album singles
"Aloneness"	2024	—	—	—	Non-album singles
"Bitter End"	2025	—	—	—	Non-album singles
"Chained Chase"	2025	—	—	—	Non-album singles
"—" denotes releases that did not chart.

== Music videos ==
Released	Song	Ref(s)
October 25, 2019	"Q-vism"	
November 27, 2019	"S-cape 2 the abs"	
March 9, 2020	"Synthetic Sympathy (PSYCHO-PASS ver.)"	
March 27, 2020	"Synthetic Sympathy"	
April 13, 2020	"ErroЯ CODE"	
January 30, 2021	"Vivid Vice"	
July 28, 2021	"Icy Ivy"	
August 14, 2021	"Icy Ivy (Coveted Eden MIX) - Sakura Chill Beats Singles"	
October 27, 2021	"Wander Wraith"	
November 10, 2021	"Growling Ghoul"	
June 2, 2022	"A Shout Of Triumph"	

== Live ==
Event date	Title	Venue	Note(s)	Ref(s)
April 2, 2021	TikTok 『Next Fire	Online live		
August 20, 2021	『VIVID × VIVID』case of "Icy Ivy"	Tokyo, YouTube live streaming	Invited 100 persons who purchased the EP『Icy Ivy』	

== Events ==
Event date	Title	Venue	Note(s)	Ref(s)
July 19,2024	Hyper Japan 2024	London, England	Sang various songs live like "Vivid Vice", "Q-vism", "Shout of Triumph"	
January 3, 2021	Sony Music AnimeSongs ONLINE Nippon Budokan	Nippon Budokan （Tokyo）		
June 13, 2021	Jujutsu Kaisen JuJu-Fes 2021	Kawaguchi Sogo Center(Saitama); online	Joined as a secret guest and sang Vivid Vice	

== Awards and nominations ==
Award ceremony	Year	Category	Nominee(s)/work(s)	Result	Ref.
6th Crunchyroll Anime Awards	2022	Best Opening	"Vivid Vice" (from Jujutsu Kaisen anime)	Nominated	
