= Kizu (band) =

Japanese band

- Origin: Japan
- Genres: Rock
- Years active: 2017–present
- Members: Lime; Reiki; Yue; Kyonosuke
- Website: http://ki-zu.com/

Kizu (キズ) is a Japanese visual kei rock band, formed in 2017 by Lime on vocals, Reiki on guitar, Yue on bass, and Kyonosuke as a drummer. They have released sixteen singles, nine live albums, and one full length album. The band has announced that starting February 27, 2027 they will go on hiatus. It is unclear when activities will resume.

== Career ==
The band was formed in March 2017, when they mysteriously announced a flyer with a phone number. Four months after, Kizu made its first solo performance which the 1,300 tickets available sold out in just one second. On October 10, they released their second single, "Kawazu (蛙 -Kawazu-)".

They released the single "Steroid" (ステロイド) in two editions on July 31, 2018. On November 20 of the same year, the group joined the European label Gan-Shin Records. The performance "0" on January 11, 2019, sold out in one day and the band announced the single Heisei (平成), released on March 19.

The single "Jigoku" (地獄) was released on April 28, 2020, also in two editions.

The band released their best-of album 仇 (Kataki) on April 7, 2021.It included the new songs 「ミルク」(Milk) and 「鳩」(Hato), with the latter exclusive to the deluxe edition along with an extra DVD with all the 9 Singles Music Videos.

Their album titled "1st LAST ALBUM" or "Gokuraku yori Gokujo no Ame" (極楽より極上の雨) was released on August 05, 2026 in three editions. Marking the first time Kizu released a full length album in their career.

== Members ==
- Lime (来夢) – vocals and guitar
- Reiki – guitar
- Yue (ユエ) – bass
- Kyonosuke (きょうのすけ) – drums

Kyonosuke was a roadie for drummer Meto of Mejibray.

== Discography ==
=== Singles ===
Title	Release	Oricon chart
"Oshimai" (おしまい)	May 17, 2017	69
"Kawazu" (蛙-Kawazu-)	October 10, 2017	18
"Kizuato" (傷痕)	March 13, 2018	31
"Steroid" (ステロイド)	July 31, 2018	24
"0"	October 11, 2018	39
"Heisei" (平成)	March 19, 2019	24
"Human Error" (ヒューマンエラー)	July 2, 2019	19
"Kuroi Ame" (黒い雨)	October 29, 2019	32
"Jigoku" (地獄)	April 28, 2020	28
"Strawberry Blue" (ストロベリー・ブルー)	December 8, 2021	48
"Little Girl wa Yandeiru." (リトルガールは病んでいる。)	August 31, 2022	44
"Ningen Shikkaku" (人間失格)	January 31, 2024	-

=== Albums ===
Title	Release	Oricon chart
"1st LAST ALBUM" or "Gokuraku yori Gokujou no Ame" (極楽より極上の雨)	August 05, 2026	26

=== Live albums ===
Title	Release	Oricon chart
4th ONEMAN さよなら 2018.9.24@Zepp TOKYO	December 11, 2018	14
ONEMAN TOUR FINAL 消滅 2020年2月11日EX THEATER ROPPONGI	August 19, 2020	23
