= Vivid Vice =

Extended play by Who-ya Extended

- Regular edition

EP by Who-ya Extended
- Released: February 17, 2021
- Genres: J-pop; rock
- Language: Japanese
- Label: Sony Music Japan

Who-ya Extended chronology
Wyxt (2020)	Vivid Vice (2021)	Ice Ivy (2021)

CD+DVD / Limited Pressing

Singles from Vivid Vice
- 1. "Vivid Vice" Released: February 17, 2021

Vivid Vice (stylized in all caps) is the first extended play by Japanese band Who-ya Extended. It was released on February 17, 2021, by Sony Music Japan. The album was released in three versions: regular edition, first limited edition and limited edition. The first limited-edition DVD includes the music video for the single "Vivid Vice". The limited-edition CD+DVD includes an artwork based on the Jujutsu Kaisen anime series. This album focuses on the "feeling of running" and the "feeling of speed" throughout all the songs. "Vivid Vice" serves as the second theme song for the first season of Jujutsu Kaisen.

== Track listing ==
All lyrics are written by Who-ya Extended; all music is composed by Who-ya Extended.

Vivid Vice (Regular edition)
No.	Title	Length
1.	"Vivid Vice"	3:05
2.	"The Master Mind"	3:27
3.	"Vivid Bang"	3:06
4.	"Enough is Enough"	4:12
5.	"Vivid Vice" (Instrumental)	3:05
Total length:		16:34

Vivid Vice (Limited edition)
No.	Title	Length
1.	"Vivid Vice"	3:05
2.	"The Master Mind"	3:27
3.	"Vivid Bang"	3:06
4.	"Enough is Enough"	4:12
5.	"Vivid Vice" (TV size)	1:33
6.	"Vivid Vice" (Instrumental)	3:05
Total length:		18:26

== Reception ==
An editor of Billboard Japan commented that the album is based on the fact that it has firmly exceeded the "expectations" impossible to avoid in a work like this, "the main characters who grow through the fights with curses, pass their obstacles and 'Vivid Vice', which was raised and mixed with the lyrics and sound image of the song, did not disappoint the viewers who were fascinated by the vision of the anime world." Animage says, "While there are phrases close to anxiety, such as 'these choices seem like traps' and 'I won't go back,' there are also strong phrases such as 'I can't stop' and 'becomes aggressive'. However, it casts a shadow on the listener's heart for a moment. A mournful guitar sound, uplifting drums, bass and lyrics that squeeze the shape of the heart overlap with the vivid animation of Jujutsu Kaisen, we also see 'wounds' in ourselves. I think this worldview is the great appeal of 'Vivid Vice'." Funplus Music said, "The most important characteristic of this song is that it has various conflicts, as symbolized by the title 'Vivid Vice', which is a combination of the words 'vivid' and 'vice'. While the drums seem to carry on, the bass plays serious lyrical melodies and the guitar skillfully uses the tones of each verse delicately to express the mental landscape of the song. While each expression is different, the balance is the lifestyle of youth, where anxiety, anger, hope, sadness and joy keep moving forward as they continue to be confused."

== Charts ==
Weekly chart performance of Vivid Vice
Chart (2021)	Peak position
Japanese Albums (Oricon)	7
Japanese Hot Albums (Billboard Japan)	12

== Awards and nominations ==
Awards and nominations for "Vivid Vice"
Ceremony	Year	Award	Result	Ref.
6th Crunchyroll Anime Awards	2022	Best Opening Sequence	Nominated	
Japan Expo Awards	2022	Daruma for Best Opening	Won	
