= The Coinlockers =

Japanese pop music band

The Coinlockers ザ・コインロッカーズ

Background information
- Also known as: Koiroka; TCL
- Genres: J-pop
- Years active: 2018–2021
- Label: Warner Music Japan

The Coinlockers (Japanese: ザ・コインロッカーズ, Hepburn: Za Koinrokkāzu) were an all-girl Japanese idol band formed on December 23, 2018. The band had a total of 38 members, all of whom played an instrument, and was produced by Yasushi Akimoto. In 2020, the group was reorganized to only include 13 members, with three members leaving by 2021. That same year, the band announced that they would be disbanding on their third anniversary of their formation, disbanding on December 23, 2021.

== History ==
In September 2018, Warner Music Japan and producer Yasushi Akimoto announced that they would have auditions for the start of a "national girl band", using system for selecting members based on songs that some of the members would be participating in. They ultimately chose 39 members from the auditions, but added two more members by the time of their debut. In December 2018, Akimoto unveiled the 41 members of the new band and the name of The Coinlockers during a press conference. They released their debut single "Yuuutsu na Sora ga Sukinanda" on June 19, 2019, which was used as a theme song for the drama Ore no Sukāto, Dokoyatta? The band also announced their first nationwide tour that took place in May.

In May 2020, the band reorganized to only include 13 members and released their second single "Boku wa Shiawase Nanoka?" From July 31 to August 14, they released the album Gunjō Mirāju on TikTok, uploading one song a day consecutively. In November 2021, the band announced that they would disband at the end of the year, the third anniversary of their debut, after a final performance at Zepp Haneda Tokyo.

== Members ==
- Ueki Mikoko (植木 美心) – vocals, guitar (2018–2019)
- Misaki Takahashi (長妻 美玖) – vocals, guitar (2018–2019)
- Kayon (カヨン) – vocals, guitar (2019–2019)
- Tsumugi Hayasaka (早坂 つむぎ) – bass (2018–2019, 2019)
- Natsuki Takahashi (髙橋 菜月) – vocals, guitar (2018–2019)
- Ruka Fukuda (福田 瑠佳) – vocals, guitar (2018–2019)
- Kagami Nozomi (鏡味 のぞみ) – bass (2018–2019)
- Akari Yamamoto (山本 朱莉) – vocals, guitar (2018–2019)
- Sumire Nakajima (中島 すみれ) – bass (2018–2019)
- Yamagishi Uta (山岸 詩) – bass (2018–2019)
- Akane Tachibana (立花 明音) – keyboards, drums (2018–2019)
- Momo Terada (寺田 もも) (2018–2019)
- Aika Yamamoto (山本 愛華) (2018–2019)
- Nagatsuma Miku (長妻 美玖) (2018–2019)
- Tomoka Hashimoto (橋本 朋夏) (2018–2019)
- Momo Yoshida (吉田 桃) (2018–2019)
- Yuri (ユリ) (2018–2019)
- Tsukine Takeuchi (竹内 月音) (2018–2019)
- Yoshino Tezuka (手塚 愛乃) (2018–2019)
- Izumi Nohara (野原 衣純) (2018–2019)
- Kanno Ibuki (菅野 伊吹) (2018–2019)
- Goryanova Zlata (ゴリヤノバ ズラータ) (2018–2019)
- Naomi Toya (戸谷 奈桜実) (2018–2019)
- Yumi Someya (染谷 悠美) (2018–2020)
- Marin Izumi (泉真凜) (2018–2020)
- Yukine Nakamura (中村 雪音) (2018–2020)
- Aimi Narusawa (成澤 愛実) (2018–2021)
- Mirai Utsunomiya (宇都 宮未来) (2018–2021)
- Яuu (ルー) – bass (2018–2021)
- Miku Funai (船井 美玖) – vocals (2018–2021)
- Yuna Udo (有働 優菜) – keyboards (2018–2021)
- Aimi Tamura (田村 愛美鈴) – keyboards (2018–2021)
- Goto Rika (後藤 理花) – keyboards (2018–2021)
- Natsumi Kinumoto (絹本 夏海) – vocals, guitar (2018–2021)
- Mori Futaba (森 ふた葉) – drums (2018–2021)
- Kisei Shimojima (下島 輝星) – guitar (2018–2021)
- Rina Matsumoto (松本 璃奈) – bass, drums (2018–2021)
- Hanna (ハンナ) – guitar (2018–2021)
- Emily (エミリ) – vocals, guitar (2018–2021)

== Discography ==
=== Studio albums ===
List of studio albums with chart positions
Title	Album details	Peak chart positions	
Title	Album details	Oricon	Billboard
Gunjō Mirāju	Japanese: 群青ミラージュ; Released: July 31–August 14, 2020; Label: Warner Music Japan; Format: streaming	–	–
Seishun to Band wa Tanoshiku de Mendokusai	Japanese: 青春とバンドは、楽しくてメンドクサイ; Released: March 24, 2021; Label: Warner Music Japan; Format: CD, digital download, streaming	18	82
Sutēji	Japanese: ステージ; Released: December 8, 2021; Label: Warner Music Japan; Format: CD, digital download, streaming	12	11

=== Singles ===
List of singles with chart positions, showing year released and album name
Title	Year	Peak chart positions		Album
Title	Year	Oricon	Billboard	Album
"Yuuutsu na Sora ga Sukinanda"	2019	16	16	Seishun to Band wa Tanoshiku de Mendokusai
"Boku wa Shiawase Nanoka?"	2020	8	89	Seishun to Band wa Tanoshiku de Mendokusai
"Yumenai Boku ga Yume wo Minda da"	2020	–	–	Seishun to Band wa Tanoshiku de Mendokusai
"Kebyō"	2020	–	–	Seishun to Band wa Tanoshiku de Mendokusai
"Aisu Chōdai"	2021	–	–	Sutēji
"Kimi Oshi!"	2021	–	–	Sutēji
