= Appare! =

Japanese idol girl group

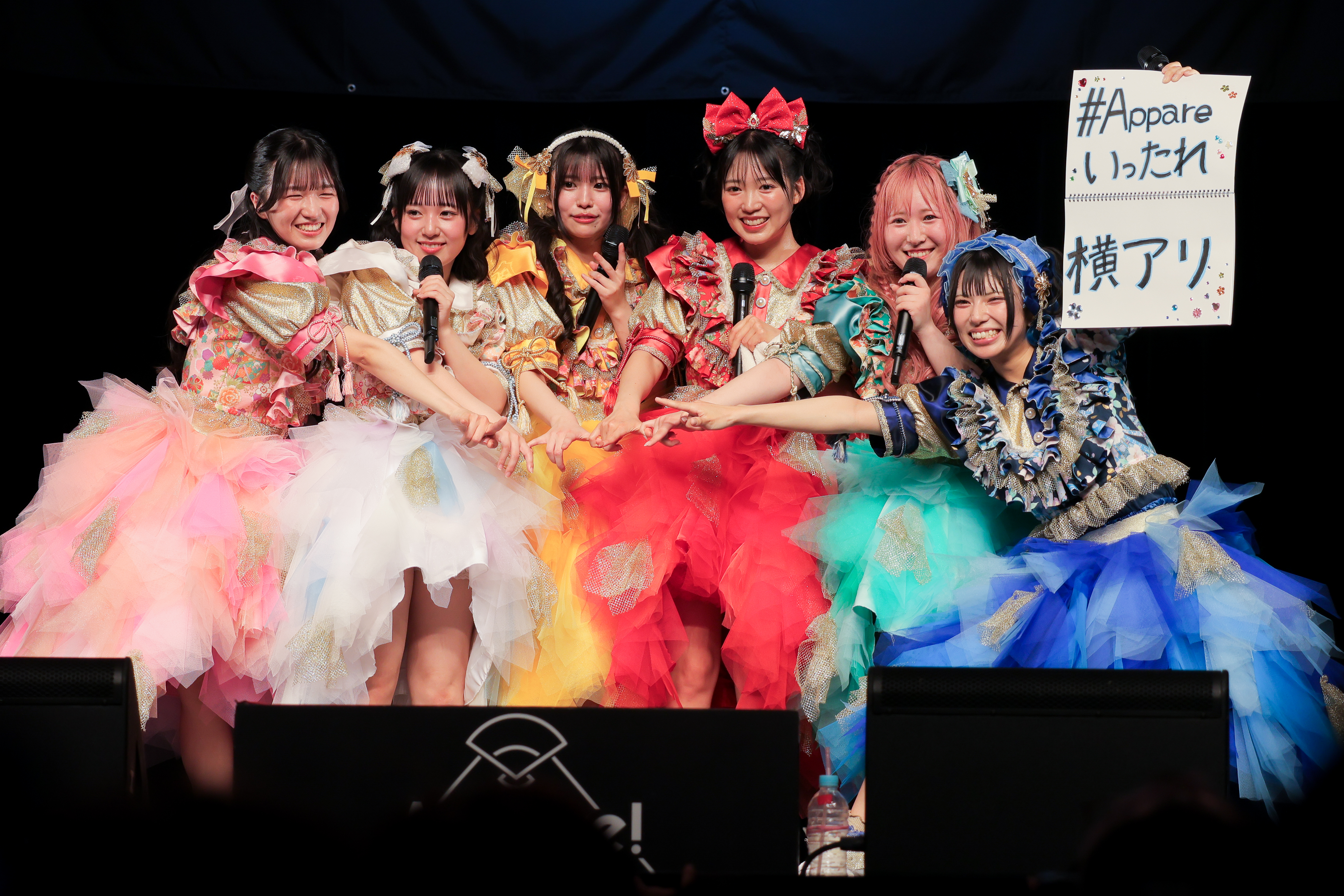
- Appare! in 2025

Background information
- Also known as: Appare! Harajuku (former name)
- Origin: Tokyo, Japan
- Genre: J-pop
- Years active: 2016–present
- Label: Takenoko Music
- Members: Rei Asahina; Mei Fujimiya; Yume Nagahori; Rea Nanase; Suzu Aoi; Ami Hashimoto; Risa Sakamoto; Natsu Morikawa; Amu Kitano
- Past members: Risa Aoki; Yuri Amatsuki; Saki Nakae; Shino Shinonome; Miku Narumi; Noka Kudo
- Website: appare-official.jp

Appare!, formerly known as Appare! Harajuku (天晴れ！原宿), is a Japanese idol girl group that formed in 2016.

== History ==
Appare! Harajuku released their debut album, Appare! World, on December 20, 2016. They released their first single "Kono Saki e! / Colorful Miracle Discovery" on April 25, 2017, and their second single "Kimi no Gankyū Goshi Sukui Tamae Idol yo / Endless Summer" on September 20. Risa Aoki graduated from the group after the release. On January 16, 2018, Yuri Amatsuki graduated from the group. In March, Three new members: Mei Fujimiya, Yume Nagahori, and Rea Nanase, joined the group. Their third single, "Parerira Parerira / Sentimental Prism", was released on June 27. On September 1, Saki Nakae graduated from the group. On December 6, Shino Shinonome graduated from the group, and on December 8, Noka Kudo and Suzu Aoi joined the group.

They released their fourth single, "Upper Light Up", on May 1, 2019. Their fifth single, "Appare Summer!!", was released on September 18. On November 24, Miku Narumi graduated from the group. Their sixth single, "Gimme Gimme Darling", was released on February 14, 2020. On March 16, Ami Hashimoto joined the group. On July 5, They changed their name to Appare!. Their second album, Appare! Parade, was released on March 10, 2021. Their seventh single, "Bokura no Wonderland", was released on July 2. In 2022, they released their third album Appare! Toybox and their fourth album Appare! Future. Their eighth single, "Īkanji! / Hatenko Cinderella", was released on April 4, 2023, folllowed by their ninth single, "Summer Spit! / Golden Time", on August 24.

On March 18, 2025, they released their fifth album Appare! BonVoyage. On April 19, Noka Kudo graduated from the group. On June 18, they made their major label debut through Victor Entertainment with their tenth single "Daibakusō! Shubadokaan!".

In 2025, after Noka's graduation three new members joined Appare!: Risa Sakamoto (sky blue member), Natsu Morikawa (orange member) and Amu Kitano (purple member).

== Members ==
=== Current ===
- Rei Asahina (朝比奈れい)
- Mei Fujimiya (藤宮めい)
- Yume Nagahori (永堀ゆめ)
- Rea Nanase (七瀬れあ)
- Suzu Aoi (藍井すず)
- Ami Hashimoto (橋本あみ)
- Natsu Morikawa (森川なつ)
- Risa Sakamoto (坂本りさ)
- Amu Kitano (北野あむ)

=== Former ===
- Risa Aoki (青木りさ)
- Yuri Amatsuki (天月ゆり)
- Saki Nakae (中江さき)
- Shino Shinonome (東雲しの)
- Miku Narumi (成実みく)
- Noka Kudo (工藤のか)

== Discography ==
=== Studio albums ===
List of compilation albums, with selected details and chart positions
Title	Details	Peak chart positions	
Title	Details	JPN	JPN Hot
Appare! World	Released: December 20, 2016; Label: Takenoko Music; Formats: CD, digital download, streaming	—	—
Appare! Parade	Released: March 10, 2021; Label: Appare! Records; Formats: CD, digital download, streaming	26	38
Appare! Toybox	Released: March 28, 2022; Label: Appare! Records; Formats: CD, digital download, streaming	30	22
Appare! Future	Released: November 24, 2022; Label: Appare! Records; Formats: CD, digital download, streaming	23	25
Appare! BonVoyage	Released: March 18, 2025; Label: Appare! Records; Formats: CD, digital download, streaming	39	—
"—" denotes releases that did not chart or were not released in that region.

=== Singles ===
List of singles, with selected chart positions, showing year released and album name
Title	Year	Peak chart positions		Album
Title	Year	JPN	JPN Hot	Album
"Kono Saki e! / Colorful Miracle Discovery" (この先へ!/カラフルミラクルディスカバリー)	2017	33	—	Non-album singles
"Kimi no Gankyū Goshi Sukui Tamae Idol yo / Endless Summer" (君の眼球越し救いたまえアイドルよ)	2017	11	—	Non-album singles
"Parerira Parerira / Sentimental Prism" (パレリラパレリラ/センチメンタルプリズム)	2018	9	67	Non-album singles
"Upper Light Up" (アッパライナ)	2019	2	48	Non-album singles
"Appare Summer!!" (あっぱれサマーっ!!)	2019	9	49	Non-album singles
"Gimme Gimme Darling" (ギミギミダーリン)	2020	7	70	Non-album singles
"Bokura no Wonderland" (僕らのワンダーランド)	2021	19	—	Non-album singles
"Īkanji! / Hatenko Cinderella" (いいかんじっ!/破天荒シンデレラ)	2023	10	—	Non-album singles
"Summer Spit! / Golden Time" (Summer Spit!/ゴールデンタイム)	2023	23	—	Non-album singles
"Daibakusō! Shubadokaan!" (大爆走!しゅばどかーん!)	2025	10	—	Non-album singles
"Kinishinai!" (きにしないっ!)	2026	9	—	Non-album singles
"Kokkaku Idol Nijibe Unicorn" (骨格アイドル♡虹ベユニコーン)	2026	—	56	Non-album singles
"—" denotes releases that did not chart or were not released in that region.
