= Airi Miyakawa =

Japanese pop singer

- Also known as: Imoko (妹子)
- Born: 28 December 2000 (age 25); Shikine-jima, Japan
- Genre: J-Pop
- Years active: 2019-
- Label: B Zone (2019-)
- Website: mykwai.net

Airi Miyakawa (宮川愛李, Miyakawa Airi), is a Japanese singer-songwriter who debuted in 2019 and is currently signed to NiM RECORDS label, a subsidiary of B Zone. She is the younger sister of fellow singer Taisei Miyakawa.

== Career ==
In 2017 and 2018, she made guest appearance on her brother Taisei Miyakawa's live session and by taking this opportunity she got interested in singing and aimed to be a professional singer.

In 2019, she debuted with the release of EP Smartphone Bae no Mukou no Sekai under NiM Records. On the same year in November, she released her first single Sissy Sky, which was used as an ending theme to the anime television series Case Closed. In 2021, she released her first full-length album Reboot.

== Discography ==
As of the 2023, she has released 7 digital singles, 1 physical single and 1 original album.

=== Singles ===
| Title | Album details | Peak chart positions |
| Title | Album details | JPN Oricon |
|---|---|---|
| Sissy Sky | Released: 6 November 2019; Label: B Zone; Formats: CD, digital download, streaming | 20 |

=== Digital singles ===
| Year | Single | Reference |
|---|---|---|
| 2020 | "Primula" (プリムラ) | |
| 2020 | "Miwaku no Kaleido" (魅惑のカレイド) | |
| 2020 | "Sphere" (スフィア) | |
| 2021 | "Reboot" | |
| 2022 | "Kimi to Soda" (キミトソーダ) | |
| 2022 | "Aoreiedo" (アオレイド) | |
| 2023 | "Tambourine no Naru Oka" (タンバリンの鳴る丘) | |
| 2024 | "Yowamushi" (弱虫) | |
| 2024 | "Tadashi Suki to wa Ittenai!!" (ただし好きとは言ってない！！) | |

=== Albums ===
| Title | Album details | Peak chart positions |
| Title | Album details | JPN Oricon |
|---|---|---|
| Reboot | Released: 3 March 2021; Label: B Zone; Formats: CD, digital download, streaming | 47 |

=== EP ===
| Title | Album details | Peak chart positions |
| Title | Album details | JPN Oricon |
|---|---|---|
| Smartphone Bae no Mukou no Sekai (スマホ映えの向こうの世界) | Released: 26 June 2019; Label: B Zone; Formats: CD, digital download, streaming | 35 |
