= Hills Pan Kōjō =

Music venue in Osaka

- hills パン工場
- Pan Kōjō
- Address: 1-chōme-3-17 Kitahorie, Nishi Ward
- Location: Osaka, Japan
- Owner: Giza Studio
- Capacity: 300 (100 for seats, 200 standee)
- Public transit: Yotsubashi Subway Station Exit No.6; Shinsaibashi Subway Station Exit OPA

Construction
- Built: 2000
- Opened: 20 March 2003
- Renovated: 2019
- Main contractors: Saida Sai (2003-2023); Kawaguchi (2024-)

The Hills Pan Kōjō (hills パン工場, Hiruzu Pan Kōjō), often shortened to simply Pan Kōjō, is an indoor arena located in Kitahorie, Osaka, Japan. It is being operated by Giza Studio, the only major record company and label in Kansai region.

It was originally built for solely being a bakery cafe, one year after its establishment in 2003, it changed its main purpose of being live venue for the Kansai artist.

A number of famous pop and rock acts from the same music company have played at the Pan Kōjō, including Zard, B'z, Mai Kuraki, Garnet Crow and Sard Underground.

== Location ==
The Hills Pan Kōjō is located in Kitanomaru Park in the Osaka, three minutes' walking distance from Shinsaibashi subway Station, and soon after the leaving exit No.6 on the Yotsubashi Subway Station. The building is structured of 1 floor-entrance which leads directly to the downstairs. It has also 2 underfloors-B1 and B2. The B2 floor structure holds 300 people (floor seats: 100, standee: 200).

== Venue history ==
=== Music ===
In 2001, was held the world's first internet live-performance stream of the concert titled GIZA studio R&B PARTY at the Hills Pankojo Kitahorie vol.1. It was streamed by NTT communications. Only female vocalist took part of the session, including Mai Kuraki, Aiuchi Rina, Yuri Nakamura from Garnet Crow, Akiko Matsuda and Mami Miyoshi from Rumania Montevideo and Ami Matsunaga from The Tambourines. One year later in 2002, the full-length live footage has been released on DVD with the same title.

On the open day 20 March 2003, they've launched series of the weekly live event "Thursday Live". On the open day, the rock-band Wag making the main appearance and Inaba Koshi from B'z make a special guest appearance. By next year in 2004, artist outside the music agency made stage appearance included Daigo Stardust and Fayray.

All the concerts held at Pankojo were streamed at the "Flets Square" (operated by NTT) from July 17, 2003, in the western area of Japan and from May 2005 in the East Japan area until March 29, 2007.

In 2009, the live session series title changed to Saturday Live and since the held irregularly.

In 2013, the bakery cafe has been closed, the announcement was made through the Twitter status.

The record for the most Pan Kojo music concerts is held by Shiori Takei, following Yumi Shizukusa and Utoku Keiko

Artists that have made stage appearance from the venue include:

==== 2000s ====
- Mami Miyoshi (Rumania Montevideo)
- Ami Matsunaga (The★tambourines)
- The★tambourines
- Akiko Matsuda (Ramjet Pulley)
- Aiuchi Rina
- Wag
- Koshi Inaba (B'z)
- Tak Matsumoto (B'z)
- Yumi Shizukusa
- Izumi Sakai (Zard)
- Keiko Utoku
- Mai Kuraki
- Garnet Crow
- Yuri Nakamura (Garnet Crow)
- Hitoshi Okamoto (Garnet Crow)
- Aya Kamiki
- Shiori Takei
- Aiko Kitahara
- U-ka Saegusa in dB
- Daigo Stardust
- Zyyg
- Fayray
- Hiroshi Asai
- Hayami Kishimoto
- Azumi Uehara
- Akane Sugazaki
- Daisuke Ikeda
- Chicago Poodle
- Saeko Ura
- Yoshinobu Ohga
- Ai Takaoka
- Shane Gaalaas

==== 2010s ====
- Saasa
- Sard Underground
- Marie Ueda
- Aika Ohno
- doa
- Natsuiro
- Takeshi Hayama
- Natsuki Morikawa
- U-ya Asaoka (Field of View)
- Qyoto
- Nori Shiraishi
- Akihito Tokunaga
- Takuto
- Rumania Montevideo

==== 2020s ====
- All at once
- Baad
- Morphing people
- The Black Candeez
- Akihide (Breakerz)
- Z

Notes:

- Datas of the 2000s artist were taken from the guide book THURSDAY LIVE: TRACKS OF THREE YEARS released in 2006.
- Datas of the 2010s artist were taken from the WebArchived version of the official website
- Datas include artist only once, not multiple times during various decades

== Releases ==
=== Guide Book ===
| Title | Author | Release | Publisher | ISBN |
|---|---|---|---|---|
| THURSDAY LIVE:TRACKS OF THREE YEARS | THURSDAY LIVE BOOK STAFF Hen | 13 November 2003 | Music Freak Magazine | ISBN 4-916019-45-8 |

=== CD/DVD ===
| Release date | Title | Rank | CD code | Format |
|---|---|---|---|---|
| 2002/2/14 | GIZA studio R&B PARTY at the Hills Pan Kōjō Kitahorie Vol.1 | 3 | BMBD-7005 | DVD |
| 2002/12/22 | CCP presents hills Pan Kōjō cafe vol.1 | - | TCR-12 | CD |
| 2003/10/16 | Rock Me Baby Kondo Fusanosuke LIVE hills Pan Kōjō 2004 (Kondo Fusanosuke) | - | ONBD-7035 | DVD |
| 2004/4/14 | CCP presents hills Pan Kōjō cafe vol.2 | - | TCR-12 | CD |
| 2005/4/14 | Fukkatsu! F.S.B NIGHT LIVE at hills Pan Kōjō (Feel So Bad) | - | ONBD-7059 | DVD |
| 2006/8/30 | Kitto mou Koi ni wa Naranai (Shiori Takei) | - | ONBD-7059 | CD (Track No.3) |

== See also ==
- List of indoor arenas in Japan
- B Zone
- Giza Studio
