= Christmas Non-Stop Carol =

Greatest hits album by Various artists
- Released: December 1, 2010
- Recorded: 1999–2010
- Genre: Christmas carol
- Length: 54:59
- Label: Giza Studio
- Producer: Daikō Nagato

Christmas Non-Stop Carol is the first Christmas music album by the Giza Studio recording label. It was released on 1 December 2010. The album consists of English-language versions of Christmas-themed songs. The interpretations include new and old artists from Giza Studio as well as Sakai Izumi's previously released music.

== Background ==
The album consists of 16 tracks, including 15 with vocals and one instrumental.

Zard originally recorded "Can't Take My Eyes Off You" in 1999 and released it as an EP single under same title in limited copies. The arranger Takeshi Hayama used vocals from that recording and added a Christmas-themed melody as a background.

The album includes the final recordings of Rina Aiuchi and Saegusa Yuuka before their career hiatuses at the end of the year.

In 2013, the vocalist of Garnet Crow, Yuri Nakamura, performed "Auld Lang Syne" on their final live tour in an acoustic arrangement.

== Charts ==
The album debuted at #71 on the Oricon Weekly Albums Chart, selling more than 3,000 copies in its first week.

== Track list ==
No.	Title	Original performer	Length
1.	"Can't Take My Eyes Off You" (Zard)	Frankie Valli	6:46
2.	"Joy To The World" (Rina Aiuchi)	traditional	3:24
3.	"Winter Wonderland" (Saegusa Yuuka)	Richard Himber	3:22
4.	"White Christmas" (Natsuki Morikawa)	Bing Crosby	4:20
5.	"We Wish You a Merry Christmas" (Shino Inagi)	traditional	3:17
6.	"Angels We Have Heard on High" (Hitoshi Okamoto (Garnet Crow))	traditional	2:47
7.	"Ave Maria" (Caos Caos Caos)	Frankie Valli	2:22
8.	"Jesu, Joy of Man's Desiring" (Hiromi Haneda)	J.S.Bach	3:53
9.	"Jingle Bells" (doa)	traditional	3:14
10.	"Rudolph The Red-Nosed Reindeer" (Saasa)	traditional	2:21
11.	"Last Christmas" (War-Ed)	Wham	3:59
12.	"12 Days of Christmas" (Marie Ueda)	traditional	3:01
13.	"All I Want for Christmas is You" (Hazze)	Mariah Carey	3:11
14.	"Santa Claus is Coming to Town" (Chicago Poodle)	traditional	2:59
15.	"The Christmas Song" (Yuki Okazaki)	Nat King Cole	5:00
16.	"Auld Lang Syne" (Yuri Nakamura (Garnet Crow))	traditional	1:14

== Release history ==
Year	Format(s)	Serial number	Label(s)
2010	CD	GZCA-5229	Giza Studio
