= Hitoshi Okamoto =

Hitoshi Okamoto 岡本 仁志
- Born: Kyoto, Japan
- Occupations: Guitarist; Arranger; Composer; Radio Personality
- Instrument: Guitar
- Years active: 1999-2019
- Label: Giza Studio
- Formerly of: Garnet Crow
- Website: www.giza.co.jp/superlight

Hitoshi Okamoto (岡本 仁志) is a Japanese guitarist, composer, arranger and the former member of the J-pop band Garnet Crow in years 1999 to 2013, as well as some of his own solo releases.

== Biography ==
Since the release of Okamoto's 2010 solo album "Now Printing...", he has used the stage name "Super Light" for his solo projects. As a solo artist, Okamoto writes the majority of his songs by himself, however, fellow Garnet Crow member Nana Azuki has written lyrics for some of his songs. Okamoto is sometimes referred to with the nickname "Okamocchi" (おかもっち). He has created an alternate version of the "GARNET CROW" songs "Crystal Gauge" and "Mysterious Eyes", the latter of which Okamoto had released under the "Super Light" name. During live performances as a solo artist, Okamoto sometimes plays "Garnet Crow" songs, or even invites the other Garnet members to appear as guest musicians. In "Garnet Crow" live performances, Okamoto provides back-up vocals in addition to playing the guitar.

From 2002 until 2009 he was the host of the radio show "Pastime Paradise", which was regularly broadcast on Sunday on the Japanese radio station Alpha Station (FM Kyoto 89.4). In years 2004-2006 he occasionally performed as the lead singer in THURSDAY LIVE at hills Pan Koujou "Okamoto Night" in venue Hills Pan Kōjō, where he sang his own solo and Garnet Crow songs. In years 2010-2013 he formed with the vocalist and composer of Garnet Crow, Yuri Nakamura subgroup "MINIQLO". They released four mini studio albums which were sold in limited copies, during their live performances. The albums consist of re-arranged songs from their previously release studio albums.

After disband of the band, he regularly appeared in live performances of Doa and Zard as guest musicians and sometimes provided music compositions for several Giza Studio artists.

== Discography ==
=== Studio albums ===
No.	Information	Release	Ranking
1st	A First Fine Day	20 March 2002	-
2nd	FF/Rewind	17 November 2004	39
3rd	Now Printing...	8 December 2010	74

=== Singles ===
No.	Information	Release	Ranking
1st	First fine day	8 November 2000	-
2nd	Sweet×2 Summer Rain	20 June 2001	-

=== Digital singles ===
No.	Information	Release
1st	Mysterious Eyes ~Reason P~	4 May 2011

=== Compilations album ===
Album	Release	Track	Ranking
Giza Studio Masterpiece Blend 2001	19 December 2001	DISC2 #10 Sweet×2 Summer Rain	13
GIZA studio Masterpiece BLEND 2002	18 December 2002	DISC2 #11 STRAY BEAST	15
Cool City Production Vol.8 GARNET CROW REMIXES	25 January 2005	#2 Crystal Gauge ~hitoshi okamoto mix~	Live venue limited release
Christmas Non-Stop Carol	1 December 2010	#6 Angels We Have Heard on High	71

=== Live DVD ===
No.	Information	Release	Ranking
1st	Bootleg	12 December 2012	Limited sale

== List of provided works ==
=== Composer and arranger ===
- Band-Maid: Before Yesterday, Time
- Grram: Kimi ja Nai! Watashi ja Nai!, Sora no you na hito
- Mai Kuraki: P.S My Sunshine, Juliet, Zutto...
- Aiko Kitahara: Haru Saku Michi
- Hayami Kishimoto: Air Mail..., Telepathy, reigning star
- Aya Kamiki: Just take my heart, Are you happy now?, It's a beautiful day, I'm your side, Whenever you're gone Today, Yakusoku no Basho de,
- Azumi Uehara: Marmalade Love
- Zard: Hypnosis
- Uura Saeka: Kimi ga Ita, Genzai Shinkoukei
- WAR-ED: Ikitakutemo Ikirarenai Seimei, Underworld

=== Composer ===
- Aya Kamiki: A constellation, Ever so Sweet
- Shiori Takei: Yuunagi
- Akane Sugazaki: Boyfriend, La la la ~ Yume wo Mitsumeta made~, Itsumademo Zutto
- Aiko Kitahara: Cobalt blue
- Uura Saeka: Koko janai Basho de
- Qyoto: Taiyou mo Hitoribocchi, I'm a Loser

=== Arranger ===
- Marie Ueda: Saphire, 210Go, Ookami Shounen
- Aika Ohno: Egao de Iyouyo
- WAR-ED: Mou Ichido Kangaeyou, Owaranai Monogatari, Tatakawanai Sekai ni Ima Hana ga Saku
- Aya Kamiki: Sunday Morning, Summer Memories, Kimi Sarishi Yuuwaku
- Hayami Kishimoto: Domino
- Miho Komatsu: Sun and moon, Sha la la, Tokubetsu ni Naru hi, Oozora he, Itsuka wa Dial no Koi, Himawari no Komichi, Haru no Kioku
- Saasa: Darling -Summer-, Dramatical, My Hero,
- Shiori Takei: Sleep
- Mai Kuraki: Tell me what, I promise
- Natsuiro: Sayonara Precious
- Ai Takaoka: Kokoro wo Tsunaide, Forever my friend, Omoide no Natsu ga Kuru, Kimi no Egao wo Miru to Ureshiku naru Kimi no Namida wo Miru to Setsunaku naru, Anata no Kokoro Haremasuyouni
- grram: Kanashii Hodo Kyou no Yuuhi Kirei da ne, Taisetsu Mono wa Kitto
- Nilo Koizumi: Chuushinbu
- d-project: Yureru Omoi
- Zard: Sunao ni Ienakute
- Chicago Poodle: Naitara ee
- Shiho: Junction
- Sparkling Point: Key Room Sky
- Hatchi/Hatch: Usotsuki wa Daikirai, Ai, Yume no Izumi
- PINC INC: Kimi no Ichiban ni Naritai, Shuumatsu Daikirai
- Moca: Tobenai Sora
- Yuki Okazaki: Desperado

== Magazine appearances ==
From J-Groove Magazine:

- December 2000 Vol.2
- June 2001 Vol.8
- May 2002 Vol.19

From Music Freak Magazine:

- November 2000 Vol.72: First Fine Day Interview
- June 2001 Vol.79: Sweet×2 Summer Rain Interview
- March 2002 Vol.88: Album A first fine day self liner notes
- February 2003 Vol.99: Okamoto Hitoshi Player's rhapsody (short preview)
- October 2004 Vol.119: Release information
- November 2004 Vol.120: FF/REWIND Interview
