= Baad =

Baad may refer to:

== Places ==
- Baad, Austria, small commune in Austria
- Baad, Dharwad, village in Dharwad district, Karnataka, India
- Baad, Uttara Kannada, village in Uttara Kannada district, Karnataka, India

== Others ==
- Baad (practice) Afghan/Pashtun child marriage custom
- Baad (band) Japanese rock band
- BAAD!, a performing arts venue in New York City
