= Namida Iro De =

Namida Iro de

Studio album by Sard Underground
- Released: August 21, 2024
- Recorded: 2023–24
- Genre: J-pop
- Label: Giza Studio
- Producer: Daiko Nagato

Sard Underground chronology
Hi no Nagori (2022)	Namida Iro de (2024)

Singles from Namida Iro de
- 1. "Sotsugyoushiki" Released: February 22, 2023; 2. "Sono Kekkon Shouki Desuka?" Released: August 7, 2023; 3. "Yakushainu no Uta" Released: September 20, 2023; 4. "Namida Iro de" Released: August 9, 2024; 5. "Yume de Aimashou" Released: August 17, 2024 (digitally) August 21, 2024 (physically)

Namida no Iro De (涙色で) is the second original studio album by the J-pop tribute band Sard Underground. It is scheduled to release on August 21, 2024, via Giza Studio. The album marks band's first original album in over three years. It was released on the same day as their single "Yume de Aimashou". The album was released in three versions: a standard edition and a limited, first press editions, which comes with blu-ray live.

The final album is to be released as a musical group along with the members Sugioka and Sakamoto, before their departure announcement.

== Promotion ==
=== Singles ===
"Sotsugyoushiki" was released as the first and lead single from the album on February 28, 2023. The song served as the February theme song to the Gifu Broadcasting System television program Meccha Gifu Wakaru TV. It was promoted as their "first graduation oriented song". Before the physical release, a full version of the music videoclip has been uploaded on the official YouTube Channel on 1 February. The single debut at Weekly Charts Songs No.13 on Oricon.

The second single Sono Kekkon Shouki Desuka? was released half year after the previous single. It served as a theme song to the Tokyo MX television drama-series "Sono Kekkon Shouki Desuka?". Full music-videoclip was released on the same day. The song marks band's first drama theme song to be presented. The single was released only digitally.

The third single, "Yakushainu no Uta" has been released one months later, on 20 September 2023. Compared to the previous singles, in which Shinno was in full charge, the academic-winning lyricist Sameshima Ryusei wrote the lyrics for the theme of the dogs. Before the physical release, a full version of the music videoclip has been uploaded on the official YouTube Channel on 11 August. The single debut at Weekly Charts Songs No.9 on Oricon.

Album titled track, "Namida Iro De" released as a promotional single on 9 August 2024, at the same time full music-videoclip has been published on their YouTube channel.

"Yume de Aimashou" was released as a promotional single on the 17th August. It was scheduled to release physical version on the same day as album "Namida Iro de" and is scheduled to serve as an ending theme to the anime television series Detective Conan. Full music videoclip was released after the broadcast of the episode. The song marks band's third theme song used to the anime television series, following "Sukoshi Zutsu Sukoshizutsu" released in 2020 and "Karappo no Kokoro" in 2023.

=== Tours ===
In support of the album, from 28 July until 24 August, are holding release anniversary events across the various places nationally. In September, as the musical group, they've embarked their first and only nationwide live tour Sard Underground LIVE 2024: tear drops.

== Track listing ==
Namida Iro De standard edition track listing
No.	Title	Writer(s)	Length
1.	"Watashi to Koi wo Shite kudasai (私と恋をしてください)"	Daiko Nagato; Yua Shinno; Yumeto Tsuresawa; Yuya Fujinaka	5:07
2.	"Namida Iro de (涙色で)"	Shinno; Masazumi Ozawa	4:04
3.	"Sono Kekkon Shouki Desuka? (その結婚、正気ですか？)"	Shinno; Ozawa; Hiroshi Asai	3:57
4.	"Yume de Aimashou (夢で逢いましょう)"	Shinno; Ozawa	4:45
5.	"Hoshi no Hikari (星の光)"	Shinno; Aika Ohno; Asai	3:10
6.	"Futari Shizuka (フタリシズカ)"	Shinno; Nagato; Ohno; Tsuresawa	4:53
7.	"Biwako Ohashi (琵琶湖大橋)"	Shinno; Akihito Tokunaga	3:39
8.	"Yakushake no Uta (役者犬のうた)"	Ryusei Samejima; Nagato; Tokunaga	5:40
9.	"Ame wa Niji ni Naru (雨は虹になる)"	Shinno; Yuu Asakawa; Kazuya Suzuki	4:31
10.	"Sotsugyoushiki (卒業式)"	Shinno; Tokunaga	4:14
11.	"Sanae"	Shinno; Ohno; Suzuki	4:22

== Charts ==
=== Weekly charts ===
Weekly chart performance for Namida Iro De
Chart (2024)	Peak position
Japanese Albums (Oricon)	11
Japanese Combined Albums (Oricon)	14
Japanese Hot Albums (Billboard Japan)	12

=== Monthly charts ===
Monthly chart performance for Namida Iro De
Chart (2024)	Position
Japanese Albums (Oricon)	44

== Release history ==
Release history and formats for Namida Iro De
Date	Format(s)	Label	Ref.
August 21, 2024	CD (standard edition)	Giza Studio	
August 21, 2024	CD/Blu-ray (limited edition)	Giza Studio	
August 21, 2024	Digital download	Giza Studio	
