= Daiko Nagato =

Japanese composer, record producer and music arranger

Daiko Nagato 長戸大幸
- Also known as: Danny Long; KANONJI; ROCKAKU +D
- Born: April 6, 1948 (age 78); Ōtsu, Shiga, Japan
- Genre: Japanese pop
- Occupations: Producers, Arranger, Composer, Lyricist, Arranger
- Instruments: Keyboard, Drum, Guitar,
- Years active: 1978–present
- Label: B ZONE
- Website: http://beinggiza.com/

Daiko Nagato (長戸 大幸, Nagato Daikō; born 6 April 1948) is a Japanese musical producer, musical arranger, writer and composer. He's mostly known as the founder of music company B Zone (formerly known as Being Inc.), which provided million-seller hits during the 1990s and provided more than 80 theme songs for anime television series Detective Conan. He was the recording producer for artists such as Boøwy, Loudness, TUBE, B'z, ZARD, WANDS, Maki Ohguro, DEEN, T-BOLAN, Mai Kuraki, Garnet Crow, Rina Aiuchi and Sard Underground. His brother, Shuusuke Nagato (長戸秀介) is also musical producer, guitarist, writer and founder of the music company Rey's in.

== Biography ==
On 1 November 1978, he established music company, with Keisuke Tsukimitsu (later known as a main producer of band Lindberg), composer Tetsuro Oda, lyricist Tomoko Aran, and others.

In 1989, famous Japanese rock duo B'z debuted under Vermillion Records. By their debut as the first Being artist, he maintained his position officially in the Being Office.

With the debut of band Zard in 1991 and following success of debuting and producing artist next two years, there was a temporal social music phenomenon called as a Being Boom (ビーイングブーム): seven out of ten artist produced by himself were in the Top 10 of the Best Hit Sellers in 1993 Oricon Yearly Single Rankings. In late 1993, he temporarily retired as a producer because of worsening ear disease. The following producer name has been replaced with BMF (Being Music Factory). In 1997, four years later he returns to the producing business. Music recording label Zain Records established special label in Kansai, Spoonful and Nagato debuted Miho Komatsu, however four months later the label was renamed into Amemura O-town Record and lasted until 1999.

From this period, he is credited not with his stage name, but instead aliases such as Kanonji and Rockaku. In 1998, he established music recording label and music company in Osaka, Giza Studio. First artist recorded early demo tapes and officially debuted in February 1999 as The First Artist - New Cinema Tokage, Sweet Velvet and Grass Arcade.

In 2002, was released the series of compilation albums under subtitles at the BEING studio, the song selections are based on his directing choice. In 2007, he resigned as a representative director of Being. In 2008, he established the live venue Dojima River Hall.

In July 2013, tax investigations from the Tokyo and Osaka National Tax Offices pointed out about 2 billion yen was missed and 1 billion yen was hidden over the five years from 2007 to 2012. Taking responsibility for this scandal, production activities were suspended until 2014. In 2016, he returned as an arranger, producer and writer to the project D-project which the letter D is initialed from his name. Until 2019 he temporarily used initial alias +D. Since 2020, he started to use his full name in the credits for the Giza Studio artist as an arranger.

In 2020, he launched his own radio show "Oldies Goodies" along with radio personality Banba Hirofumi on the Shiga's FM Broadcasting. The topics of the shows changed between music between 50-70s and secret talks behind the production activities of his artist during 90s. For the first time ever it is marked being able to hear his speaking voice, as he never made any television or radio appearances before. In 2022, he opened his first soba restaurant "Will Soba: Kitahoire" located in Osaka. He stands in the position of the president of the restaurant. On 8 May 2023, has come announcement came from his agency about company name change from the Being Inc. to B-Zone. Although in the statement is mentioned "the renaming should represent new wave of the music in the future", the actual reason behind the change has not been announced.

He's active as a producer as of 2024.

== List of produced artist ==
- Junko Mihara
- Boøwy
- Tomoko Aran
- Loudness
- Naomi Akimoto
- TUBE
- Michiya Haruhata
- Nobuteru Maeda
- Mari Hamada
- Yoko Minamino
- B.B.Queens
- Mi-Ke
- Zard
- Hideki Saijo
- WANDS
- T-BOLAN
- Maki Ohguro
- Manish
- Daria Kawashima
- DEEN
- Zyyg
- Keiko Utoku
- Baad
- REV
- Miho Komatsu
- Mai Kuraki
- Rumania Montevideo
- Garnet Crow
- Aika Ohno
- Rina Aiuchi
- U-ka Saegusa in dB
- Aiko Kitahara
- Aya Kamiki
- Natsuki Morikawa
- Shinichi Mori
- Chicago Poodle
- Natsuiro
- D-Project
- Dps
- Daigo
- Sard Underground
- Zamb
- Leon Niihama
- Karina
- The Black Candeez
- Z
