= List of Slam Dunk episodes =

Cover of the first Blu-ray volume of Slam Dunk, as released by Toei Video on July 11, 2014.

Slam Dunk is an anime series adapted from the manga of the same title by Takehiko Inoue. The story follows Hanamichi Sakuragi, who falls in love with a girl named Haruko Akagi, and decides to enter the Shohoku High School Basketball Team in order to attract her, as she is already in love with another Shohoku player, Kaede Rukawa. As Sakuragi starts learning how to play basketball, he begins to take a liking to the sport.

Produced by Toei Animation and directed by Nobutaka Nishizawa, the series aired on TV Asahi from October 16, 1993, to March 23, 1996. Toei compiled the episodes into a series of seventeen DVDs which were released in Japan from December 10, 2004, to May 21, 2005. Toei once again collected the series in three DVD boxes during 2008. All three boxes have a total of seventeen discs.

Toei and Geneon briefly chose to release the anime on DVD after the manga was discontinued, though the anime was also discontinued after only a few volumes. The first DVD was released on March 15, 2005, and volume 4 was the last one released on June 14 of the same year, before they were cancelled. To celebrate the 20th anniversary of its broadcast, the anime was released on Blu-ray in 2014. Episodes 1-85 are the only episodes dubbed into English currently available. Episodes 86-101 were dubbed but currently only remain available subtitled. Various episodes from the series were also downloadable from IGN's Direct2Drive service. In May 2009, Joost started streaming all 101 episodes on their website. Each episode is in Japanese, with English subtitles.

Six musical themes are used through all the series: two opening themes and the four ending themes. "Kimi ga Suki da to Sakebitai" (君が好きだと叫びたい; "I Want to Shout 'I Like You'") by Baad is used as the opening theme for the first 61 episodes. "Zettai ni, Daremo" (ぜったいに 誰も; "Definitely, Anyone") by Zyyg replaces it as the opening theme for episodes 62–101. "Anata Dake Mitsumeteru" (あなただけ見つめてる; "I Only See You") by Maki Ohguro is used as the ending theme for the first 24 episodes. "Sekai ga Owaru Made wa..." (世界が終るまでは…; "Until the World Ends...") by Wands follows it as the ending for episodes 25–49. "Kirameku Toki ni Torawarete" (煌めく瞬間に捕われて; "Captured in This Magical Moment") by Manish is used for episodes 50-81 and "My Friend" (マイ フレンド, Mai Furendo) by Zard is used for episodes 82–101. The remaining music was composed by Takanobu Masuda. Three CD soundtracks were released during the airing of the series in Japan.

== Episodes ==
No.	Title	Original release date
1	"The Genius Basketball Player Is Born?!"; Transliteration: "Tensai Basuketto Man Tanjō!?" (Japanese: 天才バスケットマン 誕生!?)	October 16, 1993
Hanamichi Sakuragi is depressed after being rejected by 50 girls during middle school. Once he enters high school, he meets a girl (Haruko Akagi) who introduces him to basketball.
2	"Go to Hell, Basketball! Hanamichi vs. Rukawa"; Transliteration: "Kutabare Basuke! Hanamichi buiesu Rukawa" (Japanese: くたばれバスケ! 花道VS流川)	October 30, 1993
After school, Hanamichi has a run-in with Rukawa Kaede, who Haruko has a crush on. Hanamichi gets into a fight with him out of jealousy, causing Haruko to hate him. Later, Hanamichi gets into a competition with the Shohoku basketball captain after he calls the sport 'childish'.
3	"Gorilla vs. Hanamichi! Big Showdown!!"; Transliteration: "Gorira buiesu Hanamichi! Kyūkyoku no Taiketsu!!" (Japanese: ゴリラVS花道! 究極の対決!!)	November 6, 1993
Hanamichi pulls off an amazing defense and manages to steal the ball from Akagi. He also manages to successfully pull off a slam dunk against Akagi. After the challenge, he finds out that Akagi is actually Haruko's brother.
4	"Basketball Player Hanamichi Joins the Team!"; Transliteration: "Basuketto Man Hanamichi Nyubu!" (Japanese: バスケットマン花道入部!)	November 13, 1993
Hanamichi decides to join the basketball club, which Akagi is against. Sakuragi tries to find a way to get on Akagi's good side for Haruko's sake. After Hanamichi shows his determination, Akagi lets him join the team and entrusts his basic training to the manager, Ayako.
5	"A Spiritless Afternoon"; Transliteration: "Konjō Nashi no Gogo" (Japanese: 根性なしの午後)	November 20, 1993
Hanamichi is tired of being made to do basic dribbling practice by himself. After Akagi refuses to let him practice with the rest of the team, Hanamichi gets into a fight with him and quits the club. He later regrets his actions and returns to the club.
6	"Rukawa vs. Akagi: The Real Showdown"; Transliteration: "Rukawa buiesu Akagi: Honmono Taiketsu!" (Japanese: 流川VS赤木·本物対決!)	December 4, 1993
Kogure remarks that Hanamichi is improving at an astonishing rate. Coach Anzai stops by to announce that they will be having a practice match against Ryonan High School soon. Anzai sets up a match, freshmen vs. seniors, to measure the freshmen's skills, but Akagi doesn't let Hanamichi play. Rukawa pulls off some great moves, but isn't able to score against Akagi.
7	"Hanamichi Debut! Dunk Explosion"; Transliteration: "Hanamichi Debyū! Danku Sakuretsu" (Japanese: 花道デビュー!ダンクさく裂)	December 11, 1993
After Rukawa is defeated by Akagi, he reveals his true potential and makes a spectacular dunk. Hanamichi is allowed to play for the last two minutes of the game, and he demonstrates his skill at dribbling that he learned from Ayako. He refuses to cooperate with his teammate Rukawa, however and tries to make a slam dunk, but end up smashing the ball into Akagi's head instead.
8	"Hanamichi's Crisis! The Judo-man's Trap"; Transliteration: "Hanamichi Pinchi! Jūdō Otoko no Wana" (Japanese: 花道ピンチ! 柔道男の罠)	December 18, 1993
Aota Tatsuhiko, captain of the Shohoku Judo Club and a childhood friend of Akagi and Haruko, decides that he wants Hanamichi in the Judo Club because of his innate talent. He tries to use pictures of Haruko as bait to lure Hanamichi into the Judo Club.
9	"I'm Going to Play Basketball"; Transliteration: "Ore wa Basuketto o Yaru!" (Japanese: オレは バスケットをやる!)	December 25, 1993
Aota continues to try and bribe Hanamichi into joining the Judo Club using Haruko's photos. Hanamichi decides that he will take the pictures, but not join the Judo Club. The two get into a fight, and Hanamichi declares that he will not join the Judo Club as he is a basketball player.
10	"The Commoner's Shoot is Difficult"; Transliteration: "Shomin no Shūto wa Muzukashii" (Japanese: 庶民のシュートは むずかしい)	January 8, 1994
Akagi decides that it's about time that Hanamichi learns how to shoot. He asks Rukawa to demonstrate a simple layup shot, but Hanamichi isn't interested in learning from Rukawa. Inevitably, they get in a fight, and are banned from practice for the day.
11	"Our Love's Special Secret Training"; Transliteration: "Futari Dake no Ai no Himitsu Tokkun!?" (Japanese: 二人だけの 愛の秘密特訓!?)	January 15, 1994
After practicing the lay up shot with Haruko before school, Hanamichi finally makes it in. After a bit more practice late after school, he figures that he can make the shot roughly one in three times. A player from Ryonan named Hikouichi comes to investigate Shohoku while Hanamichi is attempting a dunk, mistaking him for Rukawa after admiring his jumping ability.
12	"Defeat Ryonan! The Fierce Training the Night Before the Match"; Transliteration: "Taose Ryōnan! Kessen Zen'ya no Mōtokkun" (Japanese: 倒せ陵南! 決戦前夜の猛特訓)	January 22, 1994
The team practices for the upcoming match. Akagi stays after with Hanamichi the day before the match to instruct him on rebounds.
13	"Shohoku vs Ryonan. Burning Captain!"; Transliteration: "Shōhoku vs Ryōnan, Moeru Kyaputen!" (Japanese: 湘北VS陵南 燃える主将(キャプテン)!)	January 29, 1994
The faceoff between Shohoku and Ryonan begins. Hanamichi is crushed when it is revealed that he won't be in the starting lineup, but soon relaxes when Anzai reassures him that he will become their "secret weapon". Uozomi and Akagi begin their rivalry as captains.
14	"Super Basketball Match With Ryonan"; Transliteration: "Chō Kōkō Kyū! Ryōnan Dotō no Kōgeki" (Japanese: 超高校級! 陵南ドトウの攻撃)	February 5, 1994
The match starts off with Ryonan leading 19-0. Life returns to Shohoku after Rukawa gets the rebound and faces off with Sendo, passing the ball to Akagi for the dunk. Shohoku manages to catch up, ending the first half with a score of 42 to 50.
15	"Hanamichi Nervously Steps Into the Spotlight"; Transliteration: "Hanamichi Kinchō no Hare Butai!" (Japanese: 花道キンチョーの 晴れ舞台!)	February 12, 1994
Finally, Sakuragi gets a chance to play when Akagi injures himself while playing. Now, there is only about 9 minutes left on the clock.
16	"Who is This Guy? Taoka's Miscalculation"; Transliteration: "Nanda Koitsu wa!? Taoka no Gosan" (Japanese: なんだコイツは!? 田岡の誤算)	February 19, 1994
With just 8 minutes left in the second half, Ryonan is still leading. Taoka tells the Ryonan to continue to attack. Sakuragi plays whole-heartedly and this impresses Sendoh.
17	"The Rebound King Sakuragi Hanamichi's Distress"; Transliteration: "Ribaundo Ō Sakuragi Hanamichi no Kunō" (Japanese: リバウンド王 桜木花道の苦悩)	February 26, 1994
Ryonan is leading with 3 points ahead of Shohoku, and Taoka says that the game will depend on how Sakuragi plays. Meanwhile, Sakuragi begins to realize how important rebounds are.
18	"Last 2 Minutes! I'll Be the One to Defeat Sendoh"; Transliteration: "Rasuto Ni Bu! Sendō wa Ore ga Taosu" (Japanese: ラスト2分! 仙道は俺が倒)	March 5, 1994
Sendoh is amazed at how good Shohoku has become, thus he begins to take the game seriously. Anzai then calls both Rukawa and Sakuragi to approach, to tell them of his plan.
19	"Time's Up! The Decisive Battle with Ryonan"; Transliteration: "Taimu Appu! Ketchaku Ryōnan Sen" (Japanese: タイムアップ! 決着陵南戦)	March 12, 1994
Although Shohoku has lost the game, Sakuragi played very well for his first game. Sakuragi and Rukawa vow that in their next game with Ryonan, they will beat Sendoh.
20	"Basketball Shoes"; Transliteration: "Basuketto Shūzu" (Japanese: バスケットシューズ)	March 19, 1994
The next day, Haruko has to accompany Sakuragi to the sports shop to buy a new pair of shoes because his old shoes are in bad shape after the practice game with Ryonan.
21	"Enormous Trouble Makers! Hanamichi vs Miyagi"; Transliteration: "Sūpā Mondaiji! Hanamichi VS Miyagi" (Japanese: スーパー問題児! 花道VS宮城)	March 26, 1994
Ryota Miyagi returns to basketball after being injured in a fight. Meanwhile, Ayako hears rumors of Miyagi's return, so she decides to investigate. She brings along Sakuragi, but Miyagi, who has a crush on Ayako, thinks that she and Sakuragi are together and immediately becomes jealous. Will Miyagi and Sakuragi be able to coexist?
22	"History's Biggest Idiot Combination is Born"; Transliteration: "Shijō Saiaku doahō Konbi Tanjō" (Japanese: 史上最悪どあほう コンビ誕生)	April 16, 1994
It almost seemed like Miyagi and Sakuragi were about to collide with each other, but it seems that things have turned out much better than expected.
23	"Shohoku Basketball Club's Last Day"; Transliteration: "Shōhoku Basuke-bu Saigo no Hi" (Japanese: 湘北バスケ部 最後の日)	April 23, 1994
A former member of the Shohoku team returns with a major bone to pick. Does this spell doom for the team?
24	"The Battle for Justice! Sakuragi's Goon Squad Joins!"; Transliteration: "Seigi no Mikata: Sakuragi Gundan Sanjō!" (Japanese: 正義の味方·桜木軍団参上)	April 30, 1994
After Ayako is slapped by one of the delinquents, Miyagi joins in the fight, and Rukawa follows suit. However, they are both easily taken down by Tetsuo. Sakuragi steps up, though he is outnumbered. Things change, however, when Sakuragi's friends appear in an unlikely fashion.
25	"The Man Who Aimed at National Championship"; Transliteration: "Zenkoku Seiha o Mezashita Otoko" (Japanese: 全国制覇をめざした男)	May 7, 1994
Mitsui and Tetsuo were defeated, but Mitsui still continues to fight. When Akagi arrives, the atmosphere becomes tense. Akagi slaps Mitsui around when the latter attacks him. Kogure then informs everyone that Mitsui was once an excellent basketball player, and was even on the team. Kogure then proceeds to tell the story of the rise and downfall of Mitsui's basketball career.
26	"Mitsui, the Problems of the Past"; Transliteration: "Mitsui Jūgo-sai no Nayami" (Japanese: 三井寿15歳の悩み)	May 14, 1994
It seems that Mitsui was once a great basketball player himself before high school. However, something happened during one practice session that changed everything.
27	"I Want To Play Basketball!"; Transliteration: "Basuke ga Shitai Desu!" (Japanese: バスケがしたいです!)	May 21, 1994
After suffering through a severe injury, Mitsui quit basketball. Now two years later, in his attempt to sabotage Shohoku's chances of participating in the tournament, his feelings for the sport appear to be returning once again.
28	"The Beginning of Interhigh Preliminaries"; Transliteration: "Intāhai Yosen Kaishi" (Japanese: インターハイ予選開始)	May 28, 1994
The day of the tournament is quickly approaching. Sakuragi is anxious to play against Sendo again, but Shohoku will have to deal with Miuradai first.
29	"Hanamichi! Debut at an Official Game"; Transliteration: "Hanamichi! Kōshikisen Debyū" (Japanese: 花道! 公式戦デビュー)	June 18, 1994
The match starts, and Anzai refuses to put Sakuragi, Rukawa, Mitsui, and Miyagi in the starting line-up as punishment for fighting. Will Anzai keep it like this for the entire game?
30	"The Introspective Army's Big Counterattack"; Transliteration: "Hansei Gundan no Daihangeki" (Japanese: ハンセイ軍団の大反撃)	June 25, 1994
With four of Shohoku's best players finally entering in the game, the tables turn quickly as they narrow the lead down to only 2. Sakuragi was hacked on a play, giving him two shots at the freethrow line, but things began to get tough for him, as nervousness broke his concentration, and his imagination started running wild.
31	"Formidable Enemy Miuradai's Secret Weapon"; Transliteration: "Shukuteki Miuradai no Himitsu Heiki" (Japanese: 宿敵三浦台の 秘密兵器)	July 2, 1994
Miuradai revealed a secret weapon of theirs that will help them try and overcome Shohoku, that secret weapon being the ox Nato.
32	"Genius Hanamichi! Certain Death Dunk"; Transliteration: "Tensai Hanamichi! Hissatsu Danku" (Japanese: 天才花道! 必殺ダンク)	July 16, 1994
Miuradai starts to gain control of the game, until Nato begins to block Rukawa instead of Sakuragi. Rukawa exploits his weakness, and this causes the game to go in Shohoku's favor.
33	"Walkout King!? Hanamichi Sakuragi"; Transliteration: "Taijō Ō!? Sakuragi Hanamichi" (Japanese: 退場王!? 桜木花道)	August 6, 1994
Shohoku's next match is against Gohoku. While they have been exceeding almost everyone's expectations, Sakuragi continues to be laughed at for his nonsensical and pointless fouls. He starts to realize that he might not be so great after all.
34	"Gorilla's Secret, Kill with Your Eyes!"; Transliteration: "Gori Jikiden: Me de Korose!" (Japanese: ゴリ直伝·眼で殺せ!)	August 20, 1994
Sakuragi and his fouling troubles continue. He unconsciously went to Akagi's house for help, and in order to help Sakuragi a little bit, Akagi gives him one piece of advice... instill his opponents with fear using his eyes. Sakuragi takes this too literally, with predictable results.
35	"Hot Blooded Guys"; Transliteration: "Otokotachi no Atsuki Omoi" (Japanese: 男たちの熱き想い)	August 27, 1994
Mitsui got himself caught up in a fight between Ryo and Tetsuo, and was eventually beaten himself. However, Sakuragi pops out of nowhere, and comes to aid his teammate when trying to get to the gym.
36	"A Well Seeded School, Enter Shoyo"; Transliteration: "Shīdo-Kō: Shōyō Tōjō" (Japanese: シード校·翔陽登場)	September 3, 1994
Sakuragi is still upset at Akagi for telling him a false technique in defense, and tries harder the next game against Tsukubu. While he gets fouled out, he's improving rather quickly, and he'll need it against a powerhouse team like Shoyo, who's the second ranking team in the tournament.
37	"Hanamichi: First-time As Starter!"; Transliteration: "Hanamichi: Hatsu Sutamen!" (Japanese: 花道·初スタメン!)	September 10, 1994
Anzai-sensei decides to start Sakuragi, much to everyone's shock. He figures that with his height and drive, he'll be the perfect weapon to use against Shoyo.
38	"Rukawa's Counterattack!"; Transliteration: "Rukawa no Hangeki!" (Japanese: 流川の反撃!)	September 17, 1994
With the Shohoku offense stalled by Shoyo's defense, Rukawa takes it upon himself to lead the offensive charge.
39	"Lightning Flash Ryota!"; Transliteration: "Denkōseka no Ryōta!" (Japanese: 電光石火のリョータ!)	September 24, 1994
With Rukawa taking the heat off of the rest of the team, Miyagi gets a chance to show off his skills as a point guard and his speed on the court.
40	"Rebound King Hanamichi Sakuragi!"; Transliteration: "Ribaundo Ō · Sakuragi Hanamichi" (Japanese: リバウンド王·桜木花道)	October 1, 1994
With Mitsui's 3 point shot, Shohoku finally catches up with Shoyo. It seems like Fujima has had enough, but Hanagata asks him to trust him for a little while longer. Fujima made a good decision in trusting his star center, for Shoyo pulled away from Shohoku again, creating another 10 point deficit.
41	"Shoyo's Ace Fujima Enters the Court"; Transliteration: "Shōyō Ēsu: Fujima Tōjō" (Japanese: 翔陽エース·藤真登場)	October 1, 1994
Driven hard by Rukawa's offense and Sakuragi's rebounding, Fujima comes off the bench to lead his team to victory.
42	"Shoyo Ace Fujima's Real Ability"; Transliteration: "Shōyō Ēsu Fujima no Jitsuryoku" (Japanese: 翔陽エース藤真の実力)	October 15, 1994
Fujima is leading a strong charge for Shoyo against Shohoku, taking the lead once again. Though Shohoku has other problems besides Fujima; Mitsui is already very tired. Will Kogure be able to take his place?
43	"Has Mitsui Reached His Limit!?"; Transliteration: "Mitsui, Genkai ka!?" (Japanese: 三井、限界か!?)	October 22, 1994
Shohoku's problems continue piling up. Mitsui can't get a 3 pointer to go in, forcing all the burden on Rukawa. Plus, Sakuragi is on the brink of fouling out, one more and he's gone. Is this the end for Shohoku?
44	"Mitsui! Stormy 3 Points"; Transliteration: "Mitsui! Arashi no Surī Pointo" (Japanese: 三井!嵐の3(スリー)ポイント)	November 5, 1994
Mitsui, reminiscing upon the past, gets the energy to play and lead his team. In just a matter of time, he scores 9 consecutive points thanks to his impressive shooting, but is it enough to overcome Shoyo?
45	"Imminent Walkout!? Hanamichi's Pinch"; Transliteration: "Taijō Mezen!? Hanamichi Pinchi" (Japanese: 退場目前!? 花道ピンチ)	November 26, 1994
While Mitsui has increased his efficiency during the game, Sakuragi still faces the risk of being dismissed. After a few destructive words from Rukawa, Sakuragi is fueled with fire.
46	"Hanamichi, Hot Dunk"; Transliteration: "Hanamichi, Atsuki Danku" (Japanese: 花道, 熱きダンク)	December 3, 1994
Thanks to a basket from Rukawa, Shohoku has finally taken the lead in a critical time. Sakuragi, wanting to feel important, jumps up at the same time as two opposing Shoyo players as he goes for the dunk. It seems like Sakuragi's long desire to perform a slam dunk will be fulfilled.
47	"Challenge From a Rival"; Transliteration: "Raibaru Kara no Chōsenjō" (Japanese: ライバルからの挑戦状)	December 10, 1994
Shohoku has defeated Shoyo, and Sakuragi is quick to spread the word, especially after his ferocious slam dunk on Hanagata. It seems like Oda, a person that went to the same junior high as him, is going to be facing Kainan. They're also hoping to pull off an upset victory like Shohoku has.
48	"The Guy Who Pledged to Defeat Kainan"; Transliteration: "Datō Kainan o Chikau Otoko" (Japanese: 打倒海南を誓う男)	December 17, 1994
Sakuragi skips practice in order to investigate on why Yohko was acting so strangely. When they get to Takezono, he is immediately met by hordes of girls who misjudge his delinquent looks as someone who came to beat up Oda in order to Sabotage Takezono's chances of beating Kainan.
49	"Takezono, Last Fight"; Transliteration: "Takezono, Saigo no Tōshi" (Japanese: 武園·最後の闘志)	December 24, 1994
The match between Takezono and Kainan starts. Kainan only put in two starters the entire game, but it seemed like it was enough to take care of their opponents. That wasn't Takezono's only problem; Oda's injury remains ignorant to everyone but Yohko and Sakuragi, and it's clearly affecting his ability to play.
50	"Challenge to the King"; Transliteration: "Ō-sama e no Chōsen" (Japanese: 王者への挑戦)	January 7, 1995
The Kanagawa Interhigh Qualifying Games has come and the match between 16-time defending prefectural champions Kainan and Shohoku has started. Rukawa's attempted dunk was foiled by Maki and his pass to Mitsui was stolen by Jin. As Kiyota asking for a pass during the fastbreak, Sakuragi managed to intercept it, however he commits travelling violation due to additional steps.
51	"Outside Calculation!? Hanamichi at His Best!"; Transliteration: "Keisan-gai!? Hanamichi Zekkōchō!" (Japanese: 計算外!?花道絶好調!)	January 14, 1995
The match between Shohoku and Kainan has been tight and intense all the way through, but it was Sakuragi who stood out the most with his cocky attitude and amazing athleticism. However, Kainan's coach is planning something to get Sakuragi off the court.
52	"Secret Weapon Against Sakuragi!"; Transliteration: "Sakuragi Fūji no Himitsu Heiki!" (Japanese: 桜木封じの秘密兵器!)	January 21, 1995
Takato seemed to have devised the perfect plan to counter-attack against Sakuragi, which is sending in the extremely small and weak Miyamasu. In an unbelievable turn around, the plan worked in which Sakuragi ends up horribly embarrassed, allowing Kainan to widen the gap. Rukawa however, seems to be heating up.
53	"The Gorilla's Injury! Desperate Situation!?"; Transliteration: "Gori Fushō! Zettai Zetsumei!?" (Japanese: ゴリ負傷!絶体絶命!?)	January 28, 1995
Coach Anzai asks for a time-out and substitutes Sakuragi. Rukawa is heated-up and starts scoring for Shohoku. Akagi assists with rebounds but takes a misstep and injures his foot. As he has to be taken out, Sakuragi goes back into the court with some words from Ansai for him and Rukawa. In the meantime, Ryonan is winning with an overwhelming difference against Takesato.
54	"King Kong's Younger Brother"; Transliteration: "Kingu Kongu, Otōto" (Japanese: キングコング·弟)	February 4, 1995
While Akagi is taking care of his injured foot in the locker room, Sakuragi takes his place as Shohoku's main line of defense against Kainan. At the same time, Ryonan managed to win their match with a whooping score of 117 points against Takezato's 64 points. Back at Shohoku's match against Kainan, Rukawa launches an individualistic attack, closing the gap from 34-45 to 40-45 deficit.
55	"The Guy Who Dominates the Game"; Transliteration: "Gēmu wo Shihai Suru Otoko" (Japanese: ゲームを支配する男)	February 11, 1995
Rukawa's individualistic strategy bears fruits as Shohoku manages to tie the game as the first half ends. Akagi was able to return to the court at the second half and with his slam dunk, Shohoku leads for the first time, 51-49.
56	"Ace Maki, Full Throttle"; Transliteration: "Ēsu Maki, Zenkai!" (Japanese: エース牧·全開!)	February 18, 1995
Maki started to heat up and scored successive points for Kainan, showing his true worth as the team's ace player, and with Jin scoring from three-point range, they were able to get back the lead up to 10, 73-63, prompting Coach Anzai to sue for time.
57	"Anzai, Bet on Victory!"; Transliteration: "Anzai, Shōri e no Kake!" (Japanese: 安西·勝利への賭け!)	February 25, 1995
Coach Anzai's strategy of putting four of his players to stop Maki while Sakuragi defends Jin alone bears results as Shohoku manages to close the gap once again, 70-78. During a fastbreak, Sakuragi manages to get an intentional foul from Maki and converts his free throws, and after an assist to Miyagi, the lead went further down to 4, 74-78, with less than 5 minutes remaining in the games. Coach Takato calls time-out and Miyamazu re-entered the game, and that is when Coach Anzai assigns Miyagi to defend the other three-point shooter, shifting the defense to triangle-two strategy.
58	"Stubborn Guys!"; Transliteration: "Shibutoi Yatsura!" (Japanese: しぶとい奴ら!)	March 4, 1995
Despite alternate scoring of both teams, Shohoku manages to maintain Kainan lead to not more than 6 for the next 4 minutes as Kainan also struggles to further extend their lead. After scoring his 31st point in the game and cutting the lead down to 4, 86-90, with less than 90 seconds remaining, Rukawa collapses due to exhaustion and is being substituted by Kogure. For the next couple of seconds, no team was able to get buckets due to tighter defense, The score remains at 86-90 with 45 seconds left and Kainan ahead by four points.
59	"Last 10 Seconds! A Perfect Conclusion"; Transliteration: "Rasuto Jūbyō! Kanzen Kechakku" (Japanese: ラスト10秒!完全決着)	March 11, 1995
Shohoku maintains possession after the out-of-bounds play and both teams are tightening their defense, preventing Shohoku to get an easy shot. Mitsui forces a jumpshot but misses, but Sakuragi loses the rebound battle to Takasago, however Miyagi was able to snatch the ball and passes it to Sakuragi. Sakuragi then fakes out Takasago and slams the ball off Maki's defense and scores a counted basket, 88-90. with 19 seconds left. Sakuragi misses the bonus freethrow but Akagi was able to grab the rebound and hurriedly passes the ball to Mitsui for a three-point attempt but misses. One final play ensues with Sakuragi manages to get the rebound but makes an errant pass to Takasago, mistaking him for Akagi as time expires, dealing Shohoku their first loss in the tournament. Kiyota approaches Mitsui with his bloodied finger, telling him that he was able to nudge the ball, the reason why Mitsui misses the last three-point attempt.
60	"Shohoku on the Edge"; Transliteration: "Kakebbuchi no Shōhoku" (Japanese: がけっぷちの湘北)	March 18, 1995
Sakuragi blames himself deeply for Shohoku's loss against Kainan and becomes depressed. However, after a beating match against Rukawa, who tries to leviate the blame on himself, Sakuragi shaves his red head bald. This episode also introduces Kicchou Fukuda, a player on Ryonan's basketball team that was in disgrace.
61	"Baldy Strikes Back!"; Transliteration: "Bōzu Atama no Gyakushū!" (Japanese: ボーズ頭の逆襲!)	March 25, 1995
62	"Three-Day Super Training"; Transliteration: "Tokkun Surī DEIZU" (Japanese: 特訓3DAYS)	April 8, 1995
63	"Battle of the Aces! Kainan vs Ryonan"; Transliteration: "Chōjō Kessen! Kainan VS Ryōnan" (Japanese: 頂上決戦!海南VS陵南)	April 8, 1995
64	"King Kainan Shows its Abilities!"; Transliteration: "Honryō Hakki! Ōja Kainan" (Japanese: 本領発揮!王者·海南)	April 15, 1995
65	"The Strongest Match! Sendoh vs Maki"; Transliteration: "Saikyō Taiketsu! Sendō vs Maki" (Japanese: 最強対決!仙道vs牧)	April 29, 1995
66	"Sendoh's Bet"; Transliteration: "Sendō Isshun no Kake!" (Japanese: 仙道·一瞬の賭け!)	May 13, 1995
67	"The Final Battle! Shohoku vs Ryonan"; Transliteration: "Saishū Kessen! Shōhoku VS Ryōnan" (Japanese: 最終決戦!湘北VS陵南)	May 20, 1995
68	"Savior!? Hanamichi Sakuragi"; Transliteration: "Kyūseishu!? Sakuragi Hanamichi" (Japanese: 救世主!?桜木花道)	May 27, 1995
69	"Gorilla Goes Astray"; Transliteration: "Gori Ihen!" (Japanese: ゴリ異変!)	June 3, 1995
70	"Gorilla Dunk II"; Transliteration: "Gorila Danku II" (Japanese: ゴリラダンクII)	June 10, 1995
71	"Gorilla, Shout of Revival!"; Transliteration: "Gori Fukkatsu no Otakebi!" (Japanese: ゴリ·復活の雄叫び!)	June 17, 1995
72	"The Greatest Shame of One's Life"; Transliteration: "Jinsei Saidai no Kutsujoku" (Japanese: 人生最大の屈辱)	July 1, 1995
73	"Rukawa Kaede, Gambling on the 2nd Half"; Transliteration: "Kaede Rukawa Kōhan-sen e no Kake" (Japanese: 流川·後半戦への賭け)	July 8, 1995
74	"The Most Dangerous Challenger!"; Transliteration: "Mottomo Kiken'na Chōsen-sha" (Japanese: 最も危険な挑戦者)	July 15, 1995
75	"Fine Play"; Transliteration: "Fain Purei" (Japanese: ファインプレイ)	July 22, 1995
76	"The Feeling of Victory"; Transliteration: "Shōri no Yokan" (Japanese: 勝利の予感)	August 5, 1995
77	"You Guys Are Strong!"; Transliteration: "Kimitachi wa Tsuyoi" (Japanese: 君たちは強い)	August 12, 1995
78	"Uozumi Jun Revives"; Transliteration: "Fukkatsu! Tōshō Uozumi Jun" (Japanese: 復活!闘将·魚住純)	August 19, 1995
79	"Blue Waves - Ryonan Fights Back!"; Transliteration: "BW (Burū Ēbu)! Ryōnan no Hangeki" (Japanese: BW(ブルーウェーブ)!陵南の反撃)	August 26, 1995
80	"Shohoku's Problems"; Transliteration: "Shōhoku no Fuan Yōso" (Japanese: 湘北の不安要素)	September 2, 1995
81	"Sendoh On Fire! Shohoku Loses"; Transliteration: "Sendō Faiyā! Shōhoku Hōkai!!" (Japanese: 仙道ファイヤー! 湘北崩壊!!)	September 9, 1995
82	"Amateur Sakuragi Hanamichi the Man"; Transliteration: "Do Shirōto Hanamichi Honryō Hakki" (Japanese: ド素人·花道本領発揮)	October 21, 1995
83	"Vice-Captain Kogure's Determination"; Transliteration: "Fuku Shushō (Kyaputen) Megane-kun no Shūnen" (Japanese: 副主将(キャプテン)メガネ君の執念)	October 28, 1995
While shooting a three-pointer that will determine Shohoku's chances of winning, Kogure has a flashback from his early days of playing basketball up to the present, which also counts as a recap of the series from Kogure's point of view.
84	"Win or Lose"; Transliteration: "Shōhai" (Japanese: 勝敗)	November 4, 1995
It is a race against time between Shohoku and Ryonan to win the basketball match and earn the final qualifying position for the National Championship Games.
85	"New Challenge: The National Championship!"; Transliteration: "Aratanaru Chōsen! Zenkoku Seiha" (Japanese: あらたなる挑戦! 全国制覇)	November 11, 1995
The Shohoku Basketball Team's reputation has grown popular following their winning the final qualifying position for the National Championship Games, with Rukawa's popularity soaring high, much to Sakuragi's ire. However, it seems that Rukawa has some high ambitions of his own.
86	"Rukawa's Ambition"; Transliteration: "Rukawa no Yabō" (Japanese: 流川の野望)	November 18, 1995
In the aftermath of Ryonan losing the final qualifying position for the National Championship Games, Uozomi and Ikegami retire from the basketball team, passing the team's leadership to Sendoh, whom Yayoi Aida, Hikoichi's older sister and a basketball magazine reporter, wants to do a report on despite her editor's refusal on the grounds that Ryonan had lost.
87	"Japan's Number One High School Player"; Transliteration: "Nihon'ichi no Kōkōsei" (Japanese: 日本一の高校生)	November 25, 1995
Sakuragi chances upon Kainan players Maki and Kiyota and accompanies them to watch a basketball match between Sannoh Industry Affiliated High School and Aiwa Academy, which Maki acknowledges will be the new powerful rivals Shohoku will face in the National Championship Games. Meanwhile, Rukawa visits Coach Anzai to ask for his blessing for his wish to study abroad in the United States of America. To his surprise, Coach Anzai refuses, instead telling him to become the top-ranking player in Japan before he even thought of it.
88	"The Basketball Kingdom - America"; Transliteration: "Basuketto no Kuni Amerika" (Japanese: バスケットの国アメリカ)	December 2, 1995
Coach Anzai's wife tells Rukawa the story of Ryuji Yazawa, a talented basketball player from Anzai's past 10 years ago who became dissatisfied with Anzai's tough training for him alone and left Japan to play in the United States, where he thought he would have better opportunities to show his talent, only to become depressed as a result of the unsupportive American college basketball culture and die in a high-speed head-on car collision five years later, reportedly under the influence of drugs. This revelation forces Rukawa to rethink his views on basketball playing.
89	"Rukawa Kaede's Spirit"; Transliteration: "Kikisemaru! Rukawa" (Japanese: 鬼気迫る!流川)	December 9, 1995
With a new viewpoint, Rukawa shows great improvement on his basketball skills, impressing his teammates and fans alike, much to the ire of Sakuragi. Haruko also comes to realize that her crush on Rukawa will never be requited.
90	"Shohoku's Real Ace"; Transliteration: "Shōhoku Shin no Ēsu!" (Japanese: 湘北真のエース!)	December 16, 1995
Unwilling to accept Rukawa's improvement, Sakuragi challenges his rival to a one-on-one match to see who befits the role of Shohoku's Ace player. Meanwhile, Akagi is visited by the coach and captain of Shintai University's basketball team at his house with the invitation of joining their team upon graduating high school.
91	"The Nationals' Crisis!"; Transliteration: "Zenkoku ga Abunai!" (Japanese: 全国が危ない!)	December 23, 1995
The Shohoku Basketball Team faces an unusual crisis when four of its best players - Sakuragi, Rukawa, Miyagi and Mitsui, are at risk of being disqualified from participating in the National Championship Games due to their poor academic grades, prompting Team Captain Akagi to beg the school authorities to give them a retry test and draft them into a study camp at his house.
92	"Guys' Friendship? Sakuragi Gang"; Transliteration: "Otoko no Yūjyō!? Sakuragi Gundan" (Japanese: 男の友情!?桜木軍団)	January 13, 1996
Sakuragi's gang take part-time jobs among two rivaling beachside stands to earn the money to pay for the travel expenses to watch the National Championship Games, and learn the hard lesson of hard-earned money when they unwittingly waste their first paycheck and then have to earn it back several times fold when asked by their employers to help defend their stands against a typhoon strike. Sakuragi steals their hard-earned money to pay for his travel expenses to attend Shohoku's friendship match with Jousei High but is dismayed to learn that he is being left behind at Coach Anzai's request, and the gang steal their money back from him.
93	"Going Toward 20000 Shoots"; Transliteration: "Nimanbon e no Chōsen" (Japanese: 2万本への挑戦)	January 20, 1996
Coach Anzai reveals that Sakuragi's weakness is long-distance shooting, so he puts him through a special training regime of 20,000 practice shots in a week to prepare for the National Championship Games. Haruko and Sakuragi's gang arrive to offer support.
94	"Shizuoka's Fierce Fight! Shohoku vs. Jousei"; Transliteration: "Shizuoka no Gekitō! Shōhoku VS Josei" (Japanese: 静岡の激闘! 湘北VS常誠)	January 27, 1996
While Sakuragi's training under Coach Anzai continues, the Shohoku Basketball Team faces off against the Jousei High Basketball Team in their friendship match.
95	"Hanamichi's Hottest Day"; Transliteration: "Hanamichi no Mottomo Atsuki Ichinichi" (Japanese: 花道の最も熱き一日)	February 3, 1996
Sakuragi's training is completed just as the Shohoku Basketball Team returns from their friendship match against Jousei High, and Haruko decides to reward Sakuragi for his hard practicing by taking him to the summer festival. Sakuragi sees this as an opportunity to try to get with her, but the process became harder than he had expected.
96	"Basketball Shoes Part II"; Transliteration: "Basuketto Shūzu II" (Japanese: バスケットシューズII)	February 10, 1996
Sakuragi has been working hard for the past months to improve his basketball skills, but as a result, his shoes have torn. He visits none other than the man that gave him his first shoes.
97	"Mixed Feelings, Uozumi Returns"; Transliteration: "Atsuki Omoi Uozumi Futatabi!" (Japanese: 熱き思い·魚住再び!)	February 17, 1996
When a couple of Shoyo players decided to give their goodlucks to Shohoku, Sakuragi comes up with a suggestion; a game against Shoyo and Ryonan!
98	"Fierce Battle Begins! Shohoku vs. Shoyo/Ryonan"; Transliteration: "Gekitō Kaishi! Shōhoku vs Shōyō/Ryōnan" (Japanese: 激闘開始! 湘北vs翔陽·陵南)	February 24, 1996
Rukawa garnered all the attention with his strong start to the game, but it was Sendoh who soon stole that spotlight when he entered the gym in his fishing clothes.
99	"Facing the Strongest Team, Shohoku in Danger!"; Transliteration: "Shōhoku Ayaushi! Kyōi no Saikyō Gundan" (Japanese: 湘北危うし! 脅威の最強軍団)	March 2, 1996
The combination team has become even more formidable by adding Sendoh and Fukuda to their lineup, and while Sakuragi is still struggling, Shohoku retains the lead.
100	"The Man of Miracles, Hanamichi Sakuragi!"; Transliteration: "Kiseki no Otoko Sakuragi Hanamichi!" (Japanese: 奇跡の男·桜木花道!)	March 9, 1996
Fujima starts passing more and shooting less 3 pointers, giving hims teammates more open looks and easy opportunities to score. But is it enough to overcome Shohoku?
101	"The Glorious Slam Dunk!"; Transliteration: "Eikō no Suramu Danku" (Japanese: 栄光のスラムダンク)	March 23, 1996
The game between Shoyo-Ryonan and Shohoku continues. At the last few minutes of the practice game, Sakuragi made two jump shots and everyone is amazed. The score is tied, when Fujima and Sendo attempts to do an alley-oop. Everyone is amazed when Sakuragi appeared at the back of Sendo, blocking the supposed alley-oop. Sakuragi then takes control of the ball and when he is about to dunk the ball, he remembered what Haruko taught him about slam dunk when he first met her. Shohoku wins with the score 76-74. The last episode ends showing the team of Shohoku and Kainan about to leave Kanagawa for the Inter High. When Shohoku is about to enter the shinkansen train, they promised to themselves that they're going to win the championship.
