= Chiaki Nagato =

- 長戸 千晶
- Born: Chiaki Masui (増井 千晶); April 13, 1987 (age 39); Osaka, Japan
- Other name: vivichan
- Occupations: Business woman; Realtor; CEO; YouTuber
- Children: 3

YouTube information
- Channel: vivichan
- Years active: 2021–present
- Subscribers: 57 thousand
- Views: 15.1 million
- Musical career
- Genres: Japanese pop; anime song
- Instruments: Vocals; Guitar
- Years active: 2007–2009
- Label: Giza Studio
- Last updated: 6 March 2026

Chiaki Nagato (長戸千晶, Nagato Chiaki) (born April 13, 1987), formerly known by her stage name, Tsubaki Aoi (碧井椿) is a Japanese businesswoman, owner of beauty salon "Chiakiss", CEO of Malaysian entertainment company "Chiakiss Malaysia", realtor, YouTuber and former singer and vocalist of the punk-rock band Pinc Inc under Giza Studio.

== Biography ==
=== Musical career ===
In 2002, during the time when she attended music school, Little Cat, Nagato entered the audition "Asian Ultra Idol Audio" by using her maiden name, Chiaki Masui (増井千晶), produced by Ryuichi Kawamura. The audition was broadcast on the TX Network television program Asayan. Although she did not pass through the second screening session, in the same year, half a year later, she auditioned for the Super Starlight Contest organized by B Zone along with Giza Studio, she received the Special Jury Award. In 2007, she made her first stage appearance at the venue Hills Pan Kōjō; one month later, she made her solo debut with the single Mirai Wo and was signed under the Blue Splash agency. The single was not successful and did not chart on the Oricon Weekly Charts. In 2008, she became the lead vocalist, guitarist, and lyricist of the band Pinc Inc. Their biggest hit was the final single, So faraway, which served as an opening theme to the anime television series Golgo 13. After the release of the album in 2009, the official website announced the disbanding of the band as well as her musical career.

=== Business career ===
In 2012, she established her private yoga and clinic center, Chiakiss, located in Osaka, Minamihorie. Since 2016, she is regularly being interviewed and appears in the writing corner "Chiaki's luxury style" (チアキさんのラグジュアリースタイル) on the life-style and fashion magazines 25ans In 2019, she confessed publicly about her past musical activities through her Instagram post for the first time in 10 years.

In 2021, Nagato established YouTube channel, in which she shared video collaboration with various artist from the same music company and their relations and daily life. In the same year, she would collaborate with the Japanese YouTuber Hikaru. In 2022, it's been revealed through the Instagram posts that she has been involved with both the domestic and international real estate business, however the details were and are not shared at all. The entertainment company Chiakiss Malaysia SDN listed Nagato as its official chairwoman in 2023. BHD, established in Malacca City, Malaysia. The company was one of the main sponsors of the autumn's Japanese anime song festival. On the same day, she revealed her full name, Chiaki Nagato, for the first time. Up until then, in all interviews, she would use only her surname, Chiaki.

=== Humanitarian ventures ===
In January 2024, Nagato participated in a children charity. The proceeds from the donations were given to the non-profit organization Juvenile Equal Opportunity (abbreviated as JEO) to help children living in orphanages. The amount of the money donation hasn't been announced.

=== Personal life ===
She is the mother of three kids—two girls and one boy. The birthdays, along with the years, have not been revealed, and their faces are always hidden mosaic. The marriage and the name of her partner are unknown and have never been announced publicly. She also has a younger sister, Maho, who resides in South Korea.

== Discography ==
=== As soloist ===
==== Single ====
Title	Album details	Peak chart positions
Title	Album details	JPN Oricon
Mirai Wo	Released: 11 April 2007; Label: Giza Studio; Formats: CD	-

=== As Pink Inc ===
==== Single ====
Title	Album details	Peak chart positions
Title	Album details	JPN Oricon
Dangerous Love	Released: 19 March 2008; Label: Giza Studio; Formats: CD	-
Kimi ni Hug Saretai	Released: 28 May 2007; Label: Giza Studio; Formats: CD	-
Shuumatsu Daikirai	Released: 20 August 2007; Label: Giza Studio; Formats: CD	164
So far away	Released: 29 October 2007; Label: Giza Studio; Formats: CD	130

==== Album ====
Title	Album details	Peak chart positions
Title	Album details	JPN Oricon
Motto Kimiiro ni Somaritai	Released: 29 January 2009; Label: Giza Studio; Formats: CD, digital download	95
