= Saeko Ura =

Saeko Ura 浦 彩恵子
- Also known as: Cherie (former stage name)
- Born: April 1, 1989 (age 37); Kagoshima Prefecture, Japan
- Genres: J-pop; Rock
- Occupation: Singer
- Years active: 2006–
- Labels: Giza Studio (2006–10); Universal J (2011–12)

Saeko Ura (浦 彩恵子, Ura Saeko; born 1 April 1989, in Kagoshima Prefecture, Japan) is a Japanese singer. She was represented with Space Craft. She previously worked with the stage name Cherie.

== Biography ==
By the time she was six, Uura moved from Kagoshima Prefecture to Chiba Prefecture. She spent her high school and college years in Kansai. Uura debuted her music career with the single "Tears: Namida wa Misetakunai" in the 27 December 2006. In the 14 March 2007 she released the single "Sha la la –Ayakashi Night–", produced by B'z member Koshi Inaba, which became a hit. Uura became the first Being artist to carry out promotional activities in Myspace. In the 1 February 2011 she moved to Universal Music Japan and changed her name to Cherie. She changed to her original name later in the 30 August 2012.

== Discography ==
=== As Saeka Uura ===
==== CD singles ====
Year	Title
2006	"Tears: Namida wa Misetakunai"
2007	"Sha la la –Ayakashi Night–"
2007	"My Mirai"
2008	"Kyūkei Jikan 10-bu"

==== Limited singles ====
Year	Title
2008	"Genzai Shinkō Katachi"
2008	"Ending Song"
2009	"Koko janai Basho de"

==== Full albums ====
Year	Title
2007	Juke Vox

==== Mini-albums ====
Year	Title
2009	Dice

==== Participation works ====
Year	Title
2006	U-ka Saegusa in dB "U-ka saegusa IN db IV ~Crystal na Kisetsu ni Miserarete~"
2007	Zard "Glorious Mind"
2009	Naifu "Koigokoro: Kagayakinagara"

==== Music recordings ====
Year	Title	Song
2007	Kekkaishi: Original Soundtrack	"Sha la la –Akayashi Night– TV Edit"
2008	Giza Studio 10th Anniversary Masterpiece Blend: Fun Side	"Sha la la –Akayashi Night–"
2009	Giza Studio presents: Girls	"Sha la la –Akayashi Night–"

=== As Cherie ===
==== CD singles ====
Year	Title
2011	"Koi no Fushigi"
2011	"Trip"

==== Full albums ====
Year	Title
2011	Jack

== Films ==
Year	Title	Notes
2011	Run 60	Special guest

== Stage ==
Year	Title	Role
2013	To Ki no Kizuna –Sekigahara Kitan– Ren Bu	Kazuha Yase
