= Dps (band) =

Japanese rock band

- Origin: Japan
- Genres: Rock, alternative rock
- Years active: 2017–present
- Labels: Tent House (2017–2018); Giza Studio (2018–)
- Members: Ryosuke Kimura; Naoki Morioka; Tsuyoshi Yasui; Atsushi Kawamura
- Website: d-p-s.jp

YouTube information
- Channel: dps Official YouTube Channel
- Years active: 2017-2020
- Subscribers: 3.05 thousand
- Views: 1.28 million
- Last updated: January 15, 2024

Dps is a Japanese rock band under the Giza Studio label. They've formed in 2017 and made major debut with the single "Timeline". The song served as an theme song to the anime television series Detective Conan.

== History ==
In May 2016, Naoki participated in Zard's live tour session "25th Anniversary Live" as a guitarist. DVD footage was released on December. On the same month, Atsushi, Naoki and Tsuyoshi had participated as an arranger for Giza studio cover project D-project where he re-arranged Zard's single Ai ga Mienai and Ame ni Yurete.

In October 2016, the vocalist Ryosuke has won the main grandprix in Sugoiyo! Campastar Vocal Contest.

Three months later in 2017, the band formation has begun by adding more members as Naoki Morioka, Atsushi Yamaguchi (former known as Atsushi Kawamura from Naifu and Loe) and Tsuyoshi Asai (previously as guitarist in band Loe).

On April 28, 2017, they've held first live performance in Hill PansKoujou.

In September 2017, an official website for Dps has been launched. In November 2017, they've released first mini album Begins with Em under indies label Tent House. The album was successful with reaching into Tower Records Kansai rankings as No.1

In March 2018, they made their first radio guest appearance on the MBS radio program Kanemura Yoshiaki no Eekagen ni see! In June 2018, Dps appeared on free live Kansai Neo Rock along with bands as Qyoto, Cross Lord and Satou Cocoa to Hinawa Juu, who all of the artists belong to Being Inc's indies label. On 8 September 2018 was announced their major debut under major label Giza Studio. In October 2018 Naoki participated in music production recording as a guitarist on special project KYOTO RIMPA ROCKERS. The main producer of this project is the owner of Being Inc., Daiko Nagato. On 7 November 2018, they've released debut release single Timeline. The single is used as an opening theme for Anime television series Detective Conan. On 5 December 2018, Naoki will participate in music production recording as a guitarist in Daigo cover album Deing.

In March 2019, Dps appeared on live celebration of live house Pan Koujou Hills 16th anniversary. During free live event "Onto Vol.4" were announced first digital single Ano Koro wa Nani mo Wakaranakatta with Marty Friedman which released on 24 April 2019. This will lead as a promotional single to the upcoming fourth mini album Kamikaze which plans release on 19 June 2019 with total 4 tracks recorded. In November 2019, they've released their first digital album Gomen Nante Kotoba.

Since 2020, official website hasn't been updated and there has been no activity from the band side, as well as there has been no announcement for hiatus or disband. As of 2020, there are no news regarding Tsuyoshi or Atsushi. As of 2023, Naoki is currently active as a guitarist on the instrumental band Wweezz and Ryosuke having solo career as live-streamer on the social media.

== Members ==
- Ryosuke Kimura (木村 涼介) – vocals, lyricist
- Naoki Morioka (森丘 直樹) – guitar, composer, arranger, backing vocals
- Tsuyoshi Yasui (安井 剛志) – bass guitar, lyricist, backing vocals
- Atsushi Kawamura (川村 篤史) – drums, composer

== Discography ==
So far they've released 4 mini albums, one digital album, one digital single and one single.

=== Singles ===
	Release date	Title	Charts
1st	2018/11/07	Timeline (タイムライン)	75

=== Digital Singles ===
	Release date	Title	Reference
1st	2019/04/24	Ano Koro wa Nanimo Wakarankatta (with Marty Friedman) (あの頃は何もわからなかった)	

=== Mini albums ===
	Release date	Title	CD Code	Chart
1st	2017/11/01	Begins with Em	TCR-074	–
2nd	2018/02/07	Isso Zenbu Bukkowashite, Massakasama ni Ochiteitte (いっそ全部ぶっ壊して、真っ逆さまに落ちていって)	TCR-076	–
3rd	2018/06/14	Orange Mitaina Hirusagari (オレンジみたいな昼下がり)	TCR-077	–
4th	2019/06/19	Kamikaze (カミカゼ)	GZCA-4155	179

=== Digital album ===
	Release date	Title	Reference
1st	2019/11/27	Gomen Nante Kotoba (ごめんなんて言葉)	

== In-media usage ==
- Ippatsu Gyakuten is used as an opening theme for MBS Radio Kanemura Yoshiaki no Eekagen ni see!
- Zettai Zetsumei no Hero is used as an ending theme for MBS Radio Kanemura Yoshiaki no Eekagen ni see!
- Timeline will be used as an opening theme for Anime television series Detective Conan
