= Mika Hase =

Japanese singer-songwriter

- Born: October 20, 1984 (age 40); Osaka, Japan
- Occupation(s): Singer, songwriter
- Years active: 2000–2002; 2013–present
- Musical career
- Genres: J-pop; Indie pop
- Instruments: Vocal; guitar
- Labels: Giza Studio; MLP Records

Mika Hase (born October 20, 1984), known mononymously as Mika, is a Japanese singer and songwriter from Osaka. In October 2000, Hase released her debut extended play Secret Garden in the United Kingdom, and made a major debut in Japan in May 2001, releasing the debut single "Kiss" through Giza Studio. She went on a hiatus after releasing the third single, "Subete ga Kiete shimattemo...", but came back to the music industry in 2013, releasing the second extended play Summer Flower.

== Career ==
At the age of fifteen, Hase signed a record contract with the Japanese record label, Giza Studio and subsequently released her debut extended play Secret Garden in October 2000, to the UK market. The extended play, which includes the cover of Fairground Attraction's "Perfect", commercially failed and the label sent her back to Japan.

In May 2001, Hase released her debut single, "Kiss". The single was later included on the label's compilation album, Giza Studio Masterpiece Blend 2001 (2001). Her second single, "Orgel" was released in July 2001. The song was used as the theme song to the Japanese variety program, Un-Nan no Kibun wa Jojo. Her third and the last single from the label, Subete ga Kiete shimattemo..." was released in October 2001, and served as the theme song to the Japanese television program, Kyaeen Style. After these three singles failed to enter the major music charts, Hase was removed from the label and took a long hiatus. During the hiatus, Hase had lived in Los Angeles and New York to study music and English languaege.

In 2013, Hase came back to the music industry, self-releasing the second extended play, Summer Flower.

== Discography ==
=== Extended plays ===
Title	EP details
Secret Garden	Released: October 18, 2000; Label: MLP Records; Format: CD
Summer Flower	Released: June 25, 2013; Label: Self-released; Format: CD
Listen to My Heart	Released: 2014; Label: Self-released; Format: CD
Brand New Step	Released: August 28, 2015; Label: Self-released; Format: CD

=== Singles ===
Title	Year	Peak chart positions	Album
Title	Year	JPN	Album
"Kiss"	2001	—	Giza Studio Masterpiece Blend 2001
"Orgel" (オルゴール)	2001	—	Non-album singles
"Subete ga Kiete shimattemo..." (すべてが消えてしまっても…)	2001	—	Non-album singles
"Moyuru Omoi" (燃ゆる想い)	2020	—	TBA
