= Shintenchi Kaibyaku Shudan: Zigzag =

Japanese visual kei band

- Also known as: Zigzag
- Origin: Japan
- Genres: Rock, pop rock, alternative rock, hard rock
- Years active: 2015–present
- Label: Crimson (2015–present)
- Members: Mikoto; Ryuuya; Kagemaru
- Past members: Jin; Aoshi
- Website: zigzag.asia

YouTube information
- Channel: 真天地開闢集団ジグザグ
- Years active: 2018–present
- Subscribers: 203 thousand
- Views: 100 million
- Last updated: November 23, 2025

Shintenchi Kaibyaku Shudan: Zigzag (-真天地開闢集団-ジグザグ) (known mainly as Zigzag) is a Japanese visual kei rock band formed in 2015 and currently signed under Crimson label, subsidiaries of Giza Studio.

== Career ==
The band was formed in 2015 with the vocalist Mikoto and the members Jin and Aoshi. The members were releasing their first EP album in 2016 under independent label Crimson, subsidiary of Giza Studio. None of these albums were not successful in the music charts.

In 2017, they've managed to release another two EPs without the drummer. In January 2018, Jin left the band due to the poor health condition and ended his entire music activities. Soon after the announcement, two new members Ryuuya, who was firstly appointed in the position of the guitarist and Kagemaru as a drummer has joined in. On the same year, the band made their first stage appearance on the live event "DFT Presents Onto Live Vol.3" held at Dojima River Forum. They've reprised their appearance following year. By the end of the year, Aoshi has left the band. Ryuuya role has been replaced for the bassist and Mikoto took the role of the guitarist.

On early 2020, they released their second studio album, Zigzag Ni: Shintenchi. With the release of their third studio album Zigzag San: Mugen in 2022, the charting performance was successful enough to top at number 3 on the Oricon Weekly Album charts. In June, they were scheduled to appear on the Vol.7 as well, however due to the covid restrictions the entire event has been canceled. On the same year, they've released their first video-album Zigzag MV Collection: Ichi, debuting at number 4 on the Oricon Blu-Ray Weekly Charts. In August, their song "Requiem" has been used as an opening theme to the television program Break Out broadcast on TV Asahi, it has become their first song to receive a commercial media coverage.

In 2022, three of their songs has been used in the smartphone game Show by Rock!! Fes A Live. On the same year in December, they held their first live at Nippon Budokan, which due to its size is considered a mark in the band's career. In 2023 it was announced their fourth studio album: Zigzag Yon: Saikou, released on October 4th.

== Controversy: Mikoto and Daishi from Wands ==
When the rock band Wands has reunited for the first time 19 years with the new vocalist, Daishi Uehara, some fans have noticed the facial and tooth structure along with the voice being very similar to the Mikoto. The rumors have been denied by the Mikoto itself through the post on his social media, claiming for him being only friend who just turn out to look similar. Another fact is assumed to be name which appeared in the credits of the d-project, Daisuke Uehara (灰原大介), however it cannot be verified due to the fact that in the artist photo he is hiding his facial parts. However, both Daisuke and Mikoto started their activities as a musician in the same year under the same recording company in 2016.

== Members ==
- Mikoto (命, Mikoto) (2016–present) - vocalist, guitarist, composer, music-video director (2015–present)
- Ryuuya (龍矢, Ryuuya, born 10 May 1996) - bassist, ex-guitarist (2018–present)
- Kagemaru (影丸, Kagemaru, born 25 February 1995) - drummer (2018–present)

=== Past members ===
- Jin (刃, Jin) - guitarist (2016-2018)
- Aoshi (蒼梓, Aoshi) - bassist (2016-2019)

== Discography ==
As of the 2023, the band has released 4 studio albums, 3 compilation albums, 8 mini albums, 1 single and 4 video-albums.

=== Albums ===
==== Studio albums ====
Title	Album details	Peak chart positions
Title	Album details	JPN Oricon
Zigzag Ichi: Dai Sakkai （慈愚挫愚 壱 〜大殺界〜）	Released: 16 June 2019; Label: Crimson; Formats: CD, CD+DVD, digital download, streaming	71
Zigzag Ni: Shintenchi （慈愚挫愚 弐 〜真天地〜）	Released: 18 March 2020; Label: Crimson; Formats: CD, digital download, streaming	-
Zigzag San: Mugen （慈愚挫愚 参 -夢幻-）	Released: 5 January 2022; Label: Crimson; Formats: CD, digital download, streaming	3
Zigzag Yon: Saikou （慈愚挫愚 四 -最高-）	Released: 4 October 2023; Label: Crimson; Formats: CD, digital download, streaming	5

==== Extended plays ====
Title	Album details	Peak chart positions
Title	Album details	JPN Oricon
Tsunagaritai （繋がりたい）	Released: 1 April 2016; Label: Crimson; Formats: CD, download, streaming	—
Shikiri ga Kirai (仕切りが嫌い)	Released: 22 June 2016; Label: Crimson; Formats: digital download, streaming	—
Okini （オキニ）	Released: 1 November 2016; Label: Crimson; Formats: CD, digital download, streaming	—
Okira (オキラ)	Released: 1 December 2016; Label: Crimson; Formats: CD, digital download, streaming	-
"Menhera" Hajimemashita" ("メンヘラ"はじめました)	Released: 23 March 2017; Label: Crimson; Formats: CD, digital download, streaming	-
Kuso Menshi ne (糞麺氏ね)	Released: 25 August 2017; Label: Crimson; Formats: CD, digital download, streaming	-
Pesa Shell Vezeru (ペサ・シェルヴェゼル)	Released: 16 November 2019; Label: Crimson; Formats: CD, digital download, streaming	-
Hakyunamatata (ハキュナマタタ)	Released: 25 November 2020; Label: Crimson; Formats: CD, digital download, streaming	17

==== Compilations ====
Title	Album details	Peak chart positions
Title	Album details	JPN Oricon
Hajimete no Zigzag （はじめてのじぐざぐ）	Released: 1 January 2018; Label: Crimson; Formats: CD, download, streaming	150
Shintenchi Kaibyaku Shudan Zigzag Shiroban/Kuroban （-真天地開闢集団-ジグザグ 白盤/黒盤）	Released: 23 September 2018; Label: Crimson; Formats: CD; Both versions were released on the same day	-

=== Singles ===
Year	Single	Peak chart positions		Formats
Year	Single	JPN	JPN Physical	Formats
2018	"Kaeritai keno Kaerenai" （帰りたいけど帰れない）	-	80	CD, digital download, streaming

=== Video albums ===
Title	Album details	Peak chart positions
Title	Album details	JPN Oricon
Zigzag Mv Shut: Ichi (慈愚挫愚 MV集 -壱-)	Released: 25 November 2020; Label: Crimson; Formats: Blu-Ray	4
Zig Zag 5 Shuunen Kinen: Hakyuna Matata (慈愚挫愚 5周年記念禊～ハキュナマタタ～)	Released: 5 January 2022; Label: Crimson; Formats: Blu-Ray	4
Zenkoku Akuryō Taiji: Mugen (全国悪霊退治 -夢幻-)	Released: 19 October 2020; Label: Crimson; Formats: Blu-ray	5
Nihonbudōkan Tandoku Misogi: ZigZag (日本武道館単独禊『慈愚挫愚』)	Released: 7 June 2023; Label: Crimson; Formats: Blu-ray	2
Zigzag Mv Shut: Ni (慈愚挫愚 MV集 -弐-)	Released: 27 March 2024; Label: Crimson; Formats: Blu-Ray	8
