= Les Mauvais Garçonnes =

Japanese rock band

- Origin: Japan
- Genres: Rock
- Years active: 2001–2002
- Label: Giza Studio
- Members: Tomoka Nagano; Natsuko Sakao; Mikiko Mizuno
- Website: Official Website（WebArchived）

Les Mauvais Garçonnes (レ・モーヴェ・ギャルソンヌ) was a Japanese cover rock band under the Giza Studio label in years 2001–2002.

== History ==
On 9 May 2001, they've made debut with cover single Ai no Sanka (愛の賛歌). The original song Hymne à l'amour is performed by singer Édith Piaf. The translation lyric provided Tokiko Iwatani. B side track consist of two remixes. In the media, it was broadcast as a commercial song for a drink Love and Peach. Their debut single was smash hit, it reached #40 on Oricon Weekly Charts and it sold more than 30,000 copies.

In September they've announced the series of 3 cover singles released each month. The main jacket cover will be picture of their mascot French bulldog Luna.

On 3 October, they've released second cover single Idol wo Sagase (アイドルを探せ). B side track consist of two remixes. The original song: La plus belle pour aller danser is performed by French singer Sylvie Vartan).

On 7 November, they've released third cover single Sans toi ma mie (サン・トワ・マミー). B side track consist of two remixes. The original song Sans toi ma mie is performed by Belgian singer Salvatore Adamo.

On 5 December, they've released fourth and final cover single Barairo no Jinsei (バラ色の人生). The intro and outro are performed not in Japanese but in French. B side track consist of three remixes. The original song La Vie en rose is performed by Édith Piaf.

The following singles didn't achieve as big success as debut single and as result failed to rank on Oricon Weekly charts.

On December, their debut single was included in Giza Studio's compilation album Giza Studio Masterpiece Blend 2001.

In March 2002, after releasing first compilation cover album Ai no Sanka, the band activities has vanished. It's unknown whenever they've disbanded or are on hiatus, no official statement was never published.

== Members ==
- NAGANO TOMOKA – vocals
- Natsuko Sakao (紗加尾夏子, Sakao Natsuko) – vocals
- Mikiko Mizuno (水野幹子, Mizuno Mikiko) – guitar

== Discography ==
All four singles have been arranged by Sakae Yamaguchi and two album tracks by Akihito Tokunaga.

=== Singles ===
	Release Day	Title	Rank
1st	5/9/2001	Ai no Sanka (愛の賛歌)	40
2nd	3/10/2001	Idol wo Sagase (アイドルを探せ)	–
3rd	7/11/2001	Sans toi ma mie (サン・トワ・マミー)	–
4th	5/12/2001	Barairo no Jinsei (バラ色の人生)	–

=== Studio album ===
Release Day	Title	Rank
6/03/2002	Ai no Sanka	–

=== Compilation album ===
Release Day	Title	Album track	Rank
19/12/2001	Giza Studio Masterpiece Blend 2001	Disc1 M#10 Ai no Sanka	13

== Magazine appearances ==
From Music Freak Magazine:

- Vol.78 2001/5 (Ai no Sanka interview)
- Vol.83 2001/10 (Idol wo Sagase interview)
- Vol.84 2001/11 (Sans toi ma mie interview)
- Vol.85 2001/12 (Barairo na Jinsei interview)
- Vol.88 2002/3 (Album Ai no Sanka liner notes)
