= Akihito Tokunaga =

Akihito Tokunaga 徳永暁人
- Born: September 22, 1971 (age 55); Yokohama, Japan
- Genres: rock, pop
- Occupations: Musician, composer, arranger, songwriter
- Years active: 1993–present
- Labels: Being Inc., Giza Studio, Floodlight Company
- Member of: doa
- Website: akihito-tokunaga.com

Akihito Tokunaga (徳永 暁人, Tokunaga Akihito) (born 22 September 1971) is a Japanese musician, composer and arranger. After making a name for himself working for Being Inc. in the 1990s, he has been signed to Giza Studio from 2000 until 2023. In 2004, Tokunaga formed the rock band doa. After departure from the agency in 2023, he has become freelancer musician under independent company Floodlight.

== Biography ==
Since college he worked as orchestrator, then start working as a bassist. For artists as Zard, Mai Kuraki, B'z and many others from Being Inc. Tokunaga provided for them music and arrangements, participate in the live support for more than 15 years. Tokunaga is working as a bassist with high technology. He also participated in many chorus parts which he makes on his own. Since 2004, he is member of rock band doa as vocalist and bassist. Beside of this he's doing programming, is in charge of piano, organ, guitar, mandolin and percussion. He is also famous for composing the music to the anime Dragon Ball GT (1996–1997). In 2023, Tokunaga and doa's members have announced departure from the label Giza Studio and from September and became freelancers under Floodlight company, the announcement was made on their official website.

== List of provided works as composer and arranger ==
=== Band-Maid ===
- Don't Let Me Down
- Order

=== Mai Kuraki ===
- Feel Fine!
- Winter Bells
- Stand Up
- Make my day
- Fairy tale -my last teenage wish-
- Diamond Wave
- Yume ga Saku Haru

=== Zard ===
- Eien
- Photograph
- Sawayakana Kimi no Kimochi
- Seven Rainbow
- Vintage
- Ai wo Shinjiteitai

=== U-ka Saegusa in dB ===
- Whenever I think of you
- Kimi no Hitomi no Naka de Mystery
- June Bride ~Anata shika mienai~

=== Yumi Shizukusa ===
- Take me Take me
- Sometimes
- Control your touch
- I still believe ~Tameiki~

=== Akane Sugazaki ===
- Kimi no Namae Yobu dake de

=== Ai Takaoka ===
- Jinsei wa Paradise!

=== The★tambourines ===
- Stay young
- After wish

=== Azumi Uehara ===
- Lazy

=== WAG ===
- Just wanna be
- Time waits for no one
- Fukisusabu Kaze no Naka de
- Don't look back again
- Play One More For

=== Aya Kamiki ===
- Secret Night

=== Caos Caos Caos ===
- Far away~Aozora Miagete~

=== Aiko Kitahara ===
- Da da da, grand blue

=== Natsuiro ===
- Answer, We'll be One Heart, One Love
- Exotic Love

=== UMI☆KUUN ===
- I'm just feeling alive

== List of provided works as a composer ==
=== Zard ===
- Pray
- Good-night sweet heart

=== Aiuchi Rina ===
- Dream×Dream
- Especial thanks,
- I'll be delighted
- Broken Heart
- Wish
- Be distant

=== Azumi Uehara ===
- Himitsu

=== Aya Kamiki ===
- Communication Break

=== Mai Kuraki ===
- Be With U
- Born to be Free
- TRY AGAIN
- Barairo no Jinsei

=== grram ===
- Kanashii Hodo Kyou no Yuuhi Kirei ne
- Orange no Sora

=== U-ka Saegusa in dB ===
- Passionate Wave

=== Yumi Shizukusa ===
- Keep it Love

=== Shiori Takei ===
- Like a little Love
- Slow step
- New day
- Ano Umi ga Mietara

=== The★tambourines ===
- wonder boy

=== Manish ===
- Iranai

=== Natsuiro ===
- Bitter & Sweet Rhapsody

=== Aiko Kitahara ===
- Tango

== List of provided work as an arranger ==
=== Miho Komatsu ===
- Mysterious Love
- Watashi Sagashi
- Toori Ame
- Kawaita Sakebi

=== B'z ===
- Ultra Soul
- Calling
- Liar! Liar!
- Green
- It's Showtime!
- Ocean
- The Circle
- Survive

=== Zard ===
- Tooi Hoshi wo Kazoete
- Makenaide (in d-project)
- Hitomi Tojite
- Tenshi no you na Egao de

=== Koshi Inaba ===
- Hane
- Stay free
- Kodoku no Susume
- Toumei Ningen
- Saitahe Hotel

=== Field of View ===
- Dear Old Days
- Dreams
- Someday
- Aoi Kasa de
- Rainy day
- When I call your name

=== Tube ===
- Natsu no Mahou
- Aoi Melody
- I'm in love you, good day sunshine

=== Keiko Utoku ===
- Realize
- Trust me
- Change your life
- Are you kidding

=== Mai Kuraki ===
- Brand New Day, Like a star in the night

=== Deen ===
- Tegotae no nai Ai

=== U-ka Saegusa in dB ===
- Tears Go By
- Graduation
- Secret & Lies
- CHU☆TRUE LOVE

=== Les Mauvais Garçonnes ===
- Otoko to Onna
- Yume Miru Chanson Ningyo

=== Misia ===
- Koi Uta, Don't stop music

=== Ai Takaoka ===
- Kimi no Soba de, Natsu no Aru hi ni, You're Still The One

=== Yumi Shizukusa ===
- Wonderful World

=== Breakerz ===
- Bokura, Ao no Mirai

=== Azumi Uehara ===
- Mushoku

=== Marie Ueda ===
- Yume no Parade
- Wakannani no wa Iya da
- Synchro
- RRRRR
- Clear
- FAR

=== Natsuiro ===
- Summer Spur
- For Dear
- Girls song!!!

=== Caos Caos Caos ===
- Good-bye Memories

=== Sayuri Iwata ===
- Sora Tobu Ano Shiroi Kumo no you ni

== Interview ==
- Entertainmentstation 23.5.2016
- Ikebe Times 22.17.2017
