= Hiromi Haneda =

Hiromi Haneda 羽田 裕美
- Born: October 11, 1981 (age 43); Kobe, Japan
- Genres: J-pop
- Occupation: Pianist
- Years active: 2005–2012
- Labels: Giza Studio
- Website: web.archive.org/web/20170314193007/http://hiromi-haneda.com/profile.html

Hiromi Haneda (羽田裕美, Haneda Hiromi; born on October 11, 1981) is a Japanese pianist. She played under the Giza Studio label.

== Early life and education ==
Haneda was born in Kobe, Japan. Haneda started playing the piano at age 4. She attended the Osaka College of Music.

== Career ==
In September 2007, she performed in the memorial concert for Izumi Sakai of Zard. In 2008, Haneda released her first album, Kokoro wo Hiraite ～ZARD Piano Classics～. The last update on her personal blog was posted in December 2012. Since then, her activities have paused.

== Discography ==
During her career, Haneda released one independent album, four studio albums, and one best-of album.

=== Independent release ===
No.	Title	Release date
1st	My Baby Grand 〜Classics〜	19 January 2008

=== Studio releases ===
No.	Title	Release date	Ranking
1st	Kokoro wo Hiraite ～ZARD Piano Classics～	26 March 2008	105
2nd	Kakegae no Nai Mono ～ZARD Piano Classics～	3 September 2008	94
3rd	Anata wo Kanjiteitai ～ZARD Piano Classics～	10 December 2008	115
4th	Kimi ni Aitaku Nattara…～ZARD Piano Classics～	13 May 2009	66
Best	BEST+3 〜ZARD Piano Classics RE-RECORDING〜	15 September 2010	162
