= Baad (band) =

Japanese rock band

- Origin: Japan
- Genres: Rock; pop rock
- Years active: 1992–1999; 2023–present
- Labels: ZAIN Records; Nippon Columbia; Giza Studio
- Members: Yamada Kyouji; Kobayashi Masamichi; Shinichiro Ohta
- Past members: Hata Hideki; Arai Yasunori
- Website: Official site

Baad (BAAD stylized in all caps) is a Japanese rock band that formed in 1992 and debuted in February 1993 under label Zain Records, currently signed under Giza Studio. As of 2023, its members are vocal Kyouji Yamada, drummer Kazuyoshi Aoki, guitarist Shinichiro Ohta, and bassist Kobayashi Masamichi.

== Biography ==
The band formation has been completed in 1992 and in 1993 debut single with the single "Donna Toki Demo Hold Me Tight". Their biggest hit came with the single "Kimi ga Suki da to Sakebitai" that was used in the anime series Slam Dunk. The main vocalist and lyricist Yamada Kyouji left the band in 1995 and replaced by Hata Hideki as a second vocalist. Following that, the band switched labels from ZAIN Records to Nippon Columbia. Due to the popularity and sale declines, the band disbanded in 1999. After disband, Ohta and Arai has formed independent rock-band Rad Hammer on the same year and in 2001 has launched their activities as a band, Hata become front vocalist of the independent band Arrow. In 2004, Arai has become member of the independent pop back 03Band and Ohta has become member of the rock band Doa and is part of the band as of 2023.

In April 2023, the band announced reunite with the former members of the first vocalist and along with announcement of their live concert. On 22 May, a few days after reunited first live, drummer Arai died due to cancer. Two months later, Ohta and doa's members have announced departure from the label Giza Studio and from September and became freelancers under Floodlight company, the announcement was made on their official website.

In October 2023, Ohta himself as representative of Baad, made guest appearance at the Japan's Anime Song Festival held at Melaka, Malaysia. It became his first stage appearance overseas since his debut.

== Members ==
- Shinichiro Ohta (大田 紳一郎, Ota Shin'ichiro); (Guitar, Chorus, Lyricist, Composer)
- Masamichi Kobayashi (小林 正道, Kobayashi Masamichi); (Bass)
- Kyoji Yamada (山田 恭二, Yamada Kyoji) : (First Vocalist, Lyricist)

=== Past Member ===
- Hideki Hata (秦 秀樹, Hata Hideki); (Second Vocalist, Lyricist)
- Yasunori Arai (新井 康徳, Arai Yasunori); (Drums; died 22 May 2023)

== Discography ==
=== Singles ===
	Release Day	Romaji title	Chart
1st	17 February 1993	Donna Toki Demo Hold Me Tight (どんな時でもHold Me Tight)	-
2nd	26 May 1993	Aishitai Aisenai (愛したい愛せない)	23
3rd	1 December 1993	Kimi ga Suki da to Sakebitai (君が好きだと叫びたい)	16
4th	27 July 1994	Dakishimetai Mou Ichido (抱きしめたいもう一度)	50
5th	9 November 1994	Kimi wa Manual Toori ni wa Ugokanai (君はマニュアル通りには動かない)	-
6th	7 August 1996	Modorenai Jikan no Naka (戻れない時間の中)	-
7th	21 February 1998	Kiss Me	-
8th	23 May 1998	Follow Me	-
9th	5 August 1998	Koishite Hajimete Shitta Kimi (恋してはじめて知った君)	-

=== Albums ===
	Release Day	Romaji Title	Charts
1st	23 February 1994	Baad	16
2nd	21 November 1994	Get Back Together	-
3rd	23 September 1998	B-SOUL	-
