= Nori Shiraishi =

Nori Shiraishi 白石乃梨
- Also known as: Noririn, Caos Caos Caos
- Born: 9 May 1986 (age 40); Hyougo, Japan
- Genres: J-pop; R&B
- Occupations: singer; songwriter; producer; model
- Years active: 2008–
- Label: Giza Studio (2008–)
- Website: caoscaoscaos.jp

Nori Shiraishi (白石 乃梨, Shiraishi Nori; born 9 May 1986) is a Japanese producer, model, singer and songwriter under Giza Studio label. In 2008 she debuted as a soloist Kikyo Shiraishi, in 2009 changed it into her real name Nori Shiraishi and in 2011 under dancing group Caos Caos Caos.

== Biography ==
=== Soloist as Nori Shiraishi ===
In February 2008, Nori debuted as a soloist with a single Black written by Nori herself. The single peaked into No. "110" of Weekly Single Oricon Charts. The single served as an opening theme for dancing television program Dance Shuffle on KBS. On April, she released second single Again arranged by Hirohito Furui from Garnet Crow. As her debut single, the second single also served as an opening theme for the same dancing television program. In 2009, her second single was included in Giza Studio's compilation album GIZA studio 10th Anniversary Masterpiece Blend: Fun Side. On August, Nori has released third single Namida Afureta with same arranger person. The single served as an ending theme for August on online program Mu-Gen under Chiba Television channel. On December, she has released final single Fighter which features rapper Spock. Aside of debut single, none of her singles weren't successful enough to be in Oricon Weekly Charts.

=== Career with dancing group Caos Caos Caos ===
In 2010, the formation of 5-member dancing group "Caos Caos Caos" has started. On December, they've participated in recording cover song of Ave Maria, which appeared on Giza Studio's Christmas cover album "Christmas Non-Stop Carol".

In February 2011, "Caos Caos Caos" released major debut single, Tear Drops written by Aika Ohno and arranged by Takeshi Hayama. The single provided as an opening theme for anime television series Detective Conan. In the intro footage is animated version of Nori dancing and singing refrain of Tear Drops. The single debuted at number 60 on the Oricon Weekly Single Chart.

In April 2011, Caos Caos Caos has released second single Far Away: Aozora Miagete written and arranged by Akihito Tokunaga, the single served as an ending theme for KTV television program Mujack. The single debuted at number 176 on the Oricon Weekly Single Chart.

In August 2011, Nori has released her final single as Caos Caos Caos Let's Stand Up written by Nori herself and arranged by Takeshi Hayama. The single wasn't successful and didn't debut on the Oricon Weekly Single Chart.

=== Hiatus from music activities and idol group producer ===
In March 2017, she has started forming idol group through vocal-dance auditions to pursue her upcoming goal of producer.

In January 2018, Nori has resumed music activities by releasing 4 digital singles. On 7 February 2018, she announced hiatus from music activities after release of digital album. On 14 February, Nori has released her only digital album Noririn Monro.

In January 2019, she became a main producer to 3-member idol group TAN-SA･SUN. During middle March, one of three members has left to focus more on studying and added five more members. On 31 March, they've made stage debut on free-live event DFT represents Onto: NeoRock from Kansai.

== Discography ==
=== Studio albums ===
List of albums, with selected chart positions
Title	Album details	Peak positions
Title	Album details	JPN Oricon
as Caos Caos Caos
Noririn Monroe	Released: February 14, 2018; Label: Giza Studio; Format(s): digital download	—

=== Extended plays ===
List of albums, with selected chart positions
Title	Album details	Peak positions
Title	Album details	JPN Oricon
as Nori Shiraishi
Norizm	Released: April 15, 2009; Label: Giza Studio; Format(s): CD, digital download	—
Norizm II	Released: February 10, 2010; Label: Giza Studio; Format(s): CD, digital download	—

==== Singles ====
List of singles, with selected chart positions
Title	Year	Peak chart positions	Album
Title	Year	JPN	Album
as Kikyo Shiraishi
"Black"	2008	110	Non-album singles
"Again"	2008	—	Norizm
"Namida Afureta..."	2008	—	Non-album singles
as Nori Shiraishi
"Fighter" (featuring Spock)	2008	—	Norizm
as Caos Caos Caos
"Tear Drops"	2011	60	Non-album singles
"Far Away ~Aozora Miagete~"	2011	176	Non-album singles
"Let's Stand up"	2012	—	Non-album singles

==== Promotional singles ====
List of singles, with selected chart positions
Title	Year	Album
as Caos Caos Caos
"Papapa"	2013	Non-album singles
"Sweets Love"	2018	Noririn Monroe
"Silver Pierce"	2018	Noririn Monroe
"Lunch Time"	2018	Noririn Monroe
"Arasaa Girl"	2018	Noririn Monroe

=== Other appearances ===
List of non-single guest appearances, with other performing artists, showing year released and album name
Title	Year	Other performer(s)	Album
as Kikyo Shiraishi
"You & Me"	2008	Toki	Rui Rui
as Caos Caos Caos
"Ave Maria"	2010	Various artists	Christmas Non-Stop Carol

== Interview ==
- Black: Music Freak Magazine
- Let's Stand up: Billboard Japan
- Tear Drops: Animate Times, LiveDoor News
