= Baad, Uttara Kannada =

Baad
- village
- Country: India
- State: Karnataka
- District: Uttara Kannada

Population (2011)
  - Total: 1,552

Languages
  - Official: Kannada
- Time zone: UTC+5:30 (IST)

Baad is a village in the southern state of Karnataka, India. It is located in the Kumta taluk of Uttara Kannada district.
