= Qyoto =

Japanese band

- Origin: Kyoto, Japan
- Genres: Pop
- Instruments: Violin; guitar; bass; drum; keyboard; saxophone
- Years active: 2016–2023
- Label: Ariola Japan (2017–2023)
- Past members: Yuuki Nakazono; Hiroki; Tsuchiya; Takuya; Kensuke; Ryota
- Website: web.archive.org/web/20230517061659/http://www.qyoto.jp/ (Archived)

Qyoto was a Japanese pop band under the Ariola Japan label. The band formed in 2016 and made major debut with the single Taiyo wa Hitori Hocchi in 2017, which served as a theme song for the television series Dive!!. The band name comes from spelling Kyoto. Their main producer was Daiko Nagato from recording company B Zone.

== History ==
The first formation of band started in 2016 with the vocalist Yuuki and Hiroki. In March 2017, Tsuchiya joined to the band and complete in May Kensuke and Ryota joined, which makes 6-piece member band.

In August 2017, they released their major debut single Taiyou mo Hitori Bocchi; in the media it was promoted as an opening theme for anime television series Dive!!. On-air version was broadcast on television on 6 July. The single reached No. 75 in Oricon Weekly Rankings and charted for two weeks.

In April 2018, Yuuki made a guest appearance in the third episode of Japanese television drama Hannari Girori no Yoriko-san. In June 2018, they've appeared on free live Kansai Neo Rock along with bands as Dps, Cross Lord and Satou Cocoa to Hinawa Juu, who all of the artists belongs to Being Inc's indies label. In July 2018, after eleven months they've released second single It's all in the game, in the media it was promoted as an opening theme for anime television series Boruto: Naruto Next Generations. The single reached No. 75 in Oricon Weekly Rankings and charted for two weeks. In December 2018, they've released third single Mafuyu no Diary. The B-side song I'm Looser has been in media promoted as an opening theme for television program Kuchi Dome Kyuushi. The single reached No. 52 in Oricon Weekly Rankings and charted for three weeks.

In January 2019, their song Kimi ni Koi wo, Kokoro ni Natsu wo served as a theme song for television program Kyoto Koi Kentei. In March 2019, they appeared on live celebration of live house Pan Koujou Hills 16th anniversary. On 12 June 2019, was announced their new song Kimi ni Tsutaeta Story, which will serve as an ending theme song for anime television series Mix. The single released on 31 July. B-side tracks includes Kimi ni Koi wo, Kokoro ni Natsu wo and cover version of Touch originally performed by Yoshimi Iwasaki. On 25 August 2019, they made stage appearance on free-live event DFT presents Onto: Neorock from Kansai along with Dps and Sard Underground. On 25 September 2019, they'll released fifth single Hana Shigure/Natsu no Yuki. Hana Shigure serves as an ending theme song for Japanese television drama Jikū Tantei oyū ōedo Kagaku Sōsa. B-side tracks Natsu no Yuki serves as an ending theme and Boku no Ikiteiru Imi as an insert theme song for Japanese television drama Namonaki Fukushū-sha Zegen.

In February 2020, their new song "Lily Girl" was announced to serve as a theme song to the television drama "Soshite Yuriko ha Hitori ni natta". On the same month they have announced renewal of their radio broadcast show from "Qyoto no Hannari Time" to "Kyou wa Qyoto ni Oideyasu" slated for the April 2020.

In January 2021, the song "Last Scene" served as a theme song to the baseball match broadcast on the CS Broadcast. In August 2021 Hiroki and Ryota has been removed from the list of the members without public or website announcement, at the same time new artist profile has been update with only 4 members in it.

In January 2022, they digitally released an English version of the debut single Taiyou wa Hitoribocchi: Sun Solitary. In May 2022, they held in Kyoto their first and only one-man live in Kyoto together as a band. July 2022, following three remaining members Kensute, Takuya and Tsuchiya has announcement through official website withdrawal from the band in order to think "about upcoming world situation and music they really want to do." During the same time, it has been announced through official website that Qyoto will become a solo project solely for the vocalist Nakazono.

On 31 March 2023, through official website of KBS Kyoto radio station has been announced the end of the radio broadcast show April. On 31 May 2023, it was announced through the website the termination of Yuki Nakazono's contract along with the solo project. By August, their website had been removed and is no longer accessible.

== Past members ==
- Yuuki Nakazono (中園勇樹) – vocals, lyricist
- Hiroki – violinist, lyricist, composer
- Tsuchiya – guitarist
- Takuya – bassist
- Kensuke – drummer
- Ryota – keyboard, saxophone

== Discography ==
=== Singles ===
	Release date	Title	Chart
1st	2017/8/23	Taiyou mo Hitori Bocchi (太陽もひとりぼっち)	75
2nd	2018/07/11	It's all in the game	75
3rd	2018/12/19	Mafuyu no Diary (真冬のダイアリー)	53
4th	2019/07/31	Kimi ni Tsutaeta Story (君に伝えたストーリー)	48
4th	2019/10/25	Hanashigure/Natsu no Yuki (花時雨／夏の雪)	55

=== Digital singles ===
	Release date	Title	Reference
1st	2022/01/16	Taiyou mo Hitori Bocchi: Sun Solitary (太陽もひとりぼっち)	

=== Unreleased songs ===
- Yume no Party wa Korekara (夢のパーティーはこれから) (2019)
- Yuganda Target (歪んだターゲット) (2019)
- Haruka Saki no X-Day (遥か先のX-DAY) (2019)
- Awasugiru Kitai to Nigasugiru chikai (淡すぎる期待と苦すぎる誓い) (2019)
- Lily Girl (2020)
- Last Scene (2020)

== Interview ==
From Popscene.jp:

- It's all in the game
- Mayufu no Diary

From Natalie.mu:

- Taiyou mo Hitori Bocchi
- It's all in the game
- Mafuyu no Diary
