= Baad, Dharwad =

Baad
- village
- Country: India
- State: Karnataka
- District: Dharwad

Population (2011)
  - Total: 2,061

Languages
  - Official: Kannada
- Time zone: UTC+5:30 (IST)

Baad is a village in the southern state of Karnataka, India. It is located in the Dharwad taluk of Dharwad district.

Most of the community are fishermen, and the rest are farmers and Brahmins. Baad reaches across 4,840.5 acres of land. As of the 2011 Census of India the total population of 2,061 includes 1,047 males and 1,014 females. 389 households are located inside of Baad. There were 278 children ages 0-6.

Baad now has a public transportation service that includes a bus system located right inside the village. There is a private bus system about 5 km from the city. A railroad station is located about 10 km away from the city and the city is Called land of The JAGIRDAR'S as well.
