= Zyyg =

Japanese rock band

- Origin: Japan
- Genres: Rock
- Years active: 1993–1999, 2006, 2019–present
- Labels: B-Gram Records
- Members: Seiki Takayama; Kouji Gotou; Naoki Katou; Kenichi Fujimoto
- Past members: Seiichirou Kuribayashi; Naoki Uzumoto; Naoki Orii
- Website: Official Website

Zyyg is a Japanese rock band under B-Gram Records label. Their management office was Seas Music Factory. On April 1, 2019, it was announced their activities would resume after more than two decades.

== Members ==
=== First period (1993–1994) ===
- Seiki Takayama (高山征輝) – vocalist, lyricist
- Seiichirou Kuribayashi (栗林誠一郎) – bassist, composer, arranger
- Naoki Uzumoto (宇津本直紀) (Deen) – drummer
- Naoki Orii (折居直喜) – guitarist

=== Second period (1995–1999, 2019–) ===
- Seiki Takayama (高山征輝) – vocalist, lyricist, composer
- Kouji Gotou (後藤康二) – guitarist, composer
- Naoki Katou (加藤直樹) – bassist
- Kenichi Fujimoto (藤本健一) – drummer

== History ==
The formation of band started in 1992 with Seiki and Seiichirou together.

In May 1993, they debuted with single Kimi ga Hoshikute Tamaranai. This debut single was used as a commercial song for Suntory's beer. The single reached #3 on Oricon Weekly Charts, sold over 700,000 copies, and charted over 16 weeks. After this single, additional members Naoki Uzumoto and Naoki Orii joined in recording.

In June 1993, Seiki participated in collaboration single Hateshinai Yume wo with Zard, the members of Wands and Rev. The single was used as a theme song for NTV television sport program Geki Kuukan Pro Yakyuu93. The single was recorded for the first time on Zard compilation album ZARD BEST The Single Collection: Kiseki in 1999.

In November 1993, they released second single Kaze ni Mabushii, which was used as a commercial song for sport brand Victoria. The single reached into top 10 on Oricon Weekly charts and sold 170,000 copies.

In 1994 their sales declined with singles Kowashitai Genjitsu and No Return Love which reached only into top 30 of Oricon Weekly Charts, but still sold more than 10,000 copies. In July, as the last work of the original member lineup, they released their debut studio album Go Wild. The album reached #13 on Oricon Weekly charts and sold only 66,000 copies. After failures to catch audience interest, Seiichirou left the band and continued to focus on his solo career, along with Naoki Uzumoto and Naoki Orii as well.

In the beginning of 1995, new members Kouji, Naoki and Kenichi joined Seiki's band. In May, they released their first single of the second lineup, the band's fifth overall single Zettai ni Dare mo, composed by Tetsuro Oda. The single was used as a second opening theme for anime television series Slam Dunk. The single reached #3 on Oricon Weekly charts, sold more than 28,000 copies, and charted over 10 weeks. This song become their third biggest, and the last single which reached into the top #30 charts.

In November 1995, with the release of single Julie, their sales dropped once again; the single did not reach top charts. Julia was used as an ending theme for the TV Asahi music program Ongaku News HO.

In February 1996, they released their second album, Noizy Beat. The album reached #24 on Oricon Weekly charts, sold over 31,000 copies, and charted for three weeks.

From March until November 1996, they held their first live tour LIVE ROCKIN' HIGH Vol.Noizy Beat”. Their seventh single, Gypsy Doll, was never released as part of a studio album; instead, it was included in Being Inc.'s compilation album series Best of Best 1000.

In May 1997 they released their final, 10th single Kono Jounetsu no Soba de, which failed to enter the Oricon Weekly Charts. It was used as an ending theme for the TV Asahi program Ryū no Fukumimi.

From June until December of 1997, they held their last live tour LIVE BURST CITY “SWEET PUNKS”. In August, they released their final work in the form of the studio album Sweet Punks. The album failed to chart in the Oricon Weekly Charts. After finishing their final live on December, the band disbanded.

In 1999, their fanclub TROUBLE BEATS was cancelled.

In February 2006, almost 9 years after their final live, the original members from the second lineup gathered together and performed a one-night live LIVE ROCKIN' HIGH Final: “ONE AND ONLY MEMORIES” at hills Live Pan Koujou in Osaka.

Some of their music video clips were released in 2012 in the 2-disc DVD set Legend of 90's J-Rock Best Live & Clips.

On April 1, 2019, it was announced that they would resume activities after more than two decades under the recording label Being. On July 14th, they held the one-man live Live Rockin' High 2019: Dreamers in Tokyo for the first time in twelve years. The music video medley has been uploaded on the official YouTube channel of Being Inc. A new official website has been launched as well.

In October 2023, Takayama himself as representative of Zyyg, made guest appearance at the Japan's Anime Song Festival held at Melaka, Malaysia. It became his first stage appearance in oversea since his debut.

== Discography ==
=== Singles ===
	Release Day	Title	Chart
1st	1993/5/19	Kimi ga Hoshikute Tamaranai (君が欲しくてたまらない)	3
collab	1993/6/9	Hateshinai Yume wo (果てしない夢を)	2
2nd	1993/11/10	Kaze ni Mabushii (風にまぶしい)	6
3rd	1994/3/4	Kowashitai Genjitsu (壊したい現実)	24
4th	1994/4/23	NO RETURN LOVE	20
5th	1995/6/26	Zettai ni Dareni mo (ぜったいに 誰も)	3
6th	1995/11/13	Julia	35
7th	1996/7/22	GYPSY DOLL	90
8th	1996/11/1	Something	83
9th	1997/3/5	LULLABY	100
10th	1997/5/21	Kono Jounetsu no Soba de (この情熱のそばで)	–

=== Studio album ===
	Release Day	Title	Chart
1st	1994/7/13	Go Wild	13
2nd	1996/2/26	Noizy Beat	24
3rd	1997/8/20	Sweet Punks	–

=== Compilation album ===
Release Day	Title	Chart
2007/12/12	BEST OF BEST 1000 ZYYG	246
2014/12/29	THE BEST OF TV ANIMATION SLAM DUNK ～Single Collection～ HIGH SPEC EDITION	198

== Magazine appearances ==
From Music Freak Magazine:

- Vol.11 1995/October
- Vol.12 1995/November
- Vol.13 1995/November
- Vol.15 1996/February
- Vol.16 1996/March
- Vol.17 1996/April
- Vol.20 1996/July
- Vol.23 1996/October
- Vol.24 1996/November
- Vol.25 1996/December
- Vol.27 1997/February
- Vol.29 1997/April
- Vol.30 1997/May
- Vol.32 1997/July
- Vol.33 1997/August
- Vol.34 1997/September
- Vol.37 1997/December
- Vol.39 1998/February

From J-Rock Magazine:

- 1996/April edition
