= Saasa =

Japanese singer (born 1984)

Saasa さぁさ
- Born: November 12, 1984 (age 41)
- Origin: Osaka, Japan
- Genres: J-pop, rock, Ukulele
- Occupations: Songwriter, singer, radio host
- Years active: 2005–
- Labels: GIZA studio (2008–2013), Positive Monster (2014–)
- Website: saasa.main.jp

Saasa (さぁさ, Saasa) is a Japanese singer. Between 2008 and 2013 she was under the recording label Giza Studio and since 2014 she's active as an independent artist.

== Early life ==
She continued to perform and released more self-made singles and albums, until Giza Studio became interested. In March 2009, she released her major debut single, called Hello, Hello, Hello (ハローハローハロー). It failed to chart on Oricon. Saasa's first full album was released in July 2009, called Naturela (ナチュリラ). In 2014, she started being active as an indie artist and released her self-made album LeLe Salad, only available in Japan. She's active as of 2023.
