= Doa (Japanese band) =

Japanese rock band

doa
- Origin: Japan
- Genres: Rock, pop, folk rock, hard rock, country rock
- Years active: 2004–2024
- Labels: Tent House (2004); Giza Studio (2005–2023); Floodlight (2023–2024)
- Past members: Daiki Yoshimoto; Akihito Tokunaga; Shinichiro Ohta
- Website: doa-official.com

YouTube information
- Channel: Doa Official YouTube Channel
- Years active: 2015–2024
- Subscribers: 9.36 thousand
- Views: 5.50 million
- Last updated: August 5, 2024

doa (ドア; read as "doe-ah") was a Japanese rock band. The band is named after a single letter of each of the members' names: Daiki Yoshimoto, Shinichiro Ohta, and Akihito Tokunaga. They debuted in 2004 under recording company and label Giza Studio. In 2023, they left the company and became independent. In August 2024, they announced their intent to disband at the end of the year.

== History ==
Akihito and Shinichiro were active as musicians during the 1990s. Akihito provided arrangements for various Being Inc. artists, guitar support for live television appearances, and lead vocals for band XL. Shinichiro was a guitarist and composer in bands Baad and Rad Hammer.

In June 2004, the band debuted with mini album Deadstock under the indie label Tent House. In July 2004, their major debut was with single "Hi no Tori no you ni under music major label Giza Studio. They also performed the opening theme songs "Eiyuu" (英雄) and "Aoi Kajitsu" (青い果実) for the 2004–05 tokusatsu Ultraman Nexus. Akihito does composition and arrangement, Shinichiro does lyrics and Daiki sometimes provides English lyrics for their singles' B-sides. In 2008, their single "Glass no Highway" debuted at number 7 on the Oricon Daily Singles Charts, making it their best debuted single. The single was promoted as an ending theme for anime television series Golgo 13.

In 2010, they participated in Christmas cover album Christmas Non-Stop Carol along with other Giza and Tent House artists. In March 2011, they released their final CD single "Now and Forever", with all subsequent singles being released digitally. Also in March 2011, they performed their first hall live tour doa LIVE "open_door" 2011 Spring, releasing non-paid digital single "We are one" during the event. In 2012–2016, they sold charity goods during their live performances in order raise money for victims of the Great East Japan Earthquake, ultimately donating more than one million yen. In 2017, thirteen years after their debut, they released their first live DVD, doa 12th Winter Live "open_door" 2016. In 2019, in celebration of the 15th anniversary of their debut, they released three compilation albums consisting of fan-requested tracks. As the part of the promotion, they released a new digital single for each compilation album.

In 2020, Tokunaga released his first solo album "Route 109". In 2023, doa announced their departure from the Giza Studio label and from September became freelancers under Floodlight company. On 5 August 2024, they announced their intent to disband on 31st December.

== Members ==
- Daiki Yoshimoto (吉本 大樹, Yoshimoto Daiki) – vocals, lyricist
- Shinichiro Ohta (大田 紳一郎, Ōta Shin'ichirō) – guitar, vocals, composer, lyricist
- Akihito Tokunaga (徳永 暁人, Tokunaga Akihito) – bass, vocals, composer, lyricist, arranger

== Discography ==
They have released 15 physical singles, 18 promotional singles, 13 albums, 4 compilations albums, 1 EP and 1 live DVD.

=== Albums ===
==== Studio albums ====
List of albums, with selected chart positions
Title	Album details	Peak positions
Title	Album details	JPN Oricon
open_d	Released: February 9, 2005; Label: Giza Studio; Formats: CD, digital download, streaming	50
CANDLE	Released: November 23, 2005; Label: Giza Studio; Formats: CD, digital download, streaming	59
3rd	Released: September 26, 2007; Label: Giza Studio; Formats: CD, digital download, streaming	30
Prime Garden	Released: November 29, 2008; Label: Giza Studio; Formats: CD, digital download, streaming	31
Frontier	Released: August 12, 2009; Label: Giza Studio; Formats: CD, digital download, streaming	32
This is life	Released: August 11, 2010; Label: Giza Studio; Formats: CD, digital download, streaming	56
Ride On	Released: January 23, 2013; Label: Giza Studio; Formats: CD, digital download, streaming	63
Wanted	Released: January 22, 2014; Label: Giza Studio; Formats: CD, digital download, streaming	45
Fly High	Released: January 28, 2015; Label: Giza Studio; Formats: CD, digital download, streaming	69
Freedom x Freedom	Released: January 27, 2016; Label: Giza Studio; Formats: CD, digital download, streaming	63
Island	Released: July 4, 2018; Label: Giza Studio; Formats: CD, digital download, streaming	48
Camp	Released: December 2, 2020; Label: Giza Studio; Formats: CD, digital download, streaming	57
Cheers!	Released: September 7, 2022; Label: Giza Studio; Formats: CD, digital download, streaming	75

==== Compilation Albums ====
List of albums, with selected chart positions
Title	Album details	Peak positions
Title	Album details	JPN Oricon
doa BEST ALBUM "open_door" 2004-2014	Released: June 25, 2014; Label: Giza Studio; Formats: CD, digital download, streaming	55
Doa Best Collection "Rock Coast"	Released: July 10, 2019; Label: Giza Studio; Formats: CD, digital download, streaming	60
Doa Best Collection "Middle Coast"	Released: September 11, 2019; Label: Giza Studio; Formats: CD, digital download, streaming	67
Doa Best Collection "Ballad Coast"	Released: November 6, 2019; Label: Giza Studio; Formats: CD, digital download, streaming	83

==== EP ====
List of albums, with selected chart positions
Title	Album details	Peak positions
Title	Album details	JPN Oricon
Deadstock	Released: June 16, 2004; Label: Tent House; Formats: CD	x

=== Other appearances ===
List of non-studio album or guest appearances that feature Doa
Title	Year	Artist	Album/Single
"Jingle Bells"	2010	V.A	Christmas Non-Stop Carol
"Kokoro no Rhythm Tobichiru Butterfly"	2010	V.A	GIZA studio 10th Anniversary Masterpiece Blend: Love Side
"Eiyuu"	2010	V.A	GIZA studio 10th Anniversary Masterpiece Blend: Fun Side

=== Singles ===
List of singles, with selected chart positions
Year	Single	Peak chart positions	Album
Year	Single	JPN Physical	Album
2004	"Hi no Tori no Yō ni" (火ノ鳥のように)	46	open_d
2004	"Shiro no Jumon" (白の呪文)	34	open_d
2004	"Eiyū (英雄)	39	open_d
2005	"Aoi Kajitsu" (青い果実)	47	Candle
2005	"Kimi Dake ni Kizuite Hoshii" (君だけに気づいてほしい)	57	Candle
2005	"Candle" (キャンドル)	49	Candle
2006	"Zero no Kimochi" (ゼロの気持ち)	48	3
2006	"Kokoro no Rhythm Tobichiru Butterfly" (心のリズム飛び散るバタフライ)	38	3
2007	"Harukaze" (はるかぜ)	29	3
2008	"Glass no Highway" (ガラスのハイウェイ, Gurasu no Haiwei)	14	Prime Garden
2008	"Southern Lights" (サザンライツ, Sazan Raitsu)	21	Prime Garden
2008	I wish	39	Prime Garden
2009	"365 no Diamond" (365のダイヤモンド)	36	Frontier
2010	"Tabidachi no Uta" (旅立ちの歌)	26	Frontier
2011	Now and Forever	52	Ride On

=== Promotional singles ===
List of promotional singles, released digitally
Year	Single	Album	Reference
2011	"Just a Girl"	Ride On	
2012	"Sugar Train" (シュガー トレイン)	Ride On	
2012	"Mawari Michi" (まわり道)	Ride On	
2013	"Something"	Wanted	
2013	"Conbini Madonna" (コンビニマドンナ)	Wanted	
2013	"Dare yori mo Chikaku ni Iru no ni" (誰よりも近くにいるのに)	Wanted	
2014	"Smile"	Fly High	
2015	"Freedom x Freedom"	Freedom x Freedom	
2019	"Window"	Doa Best Collection "Rock Coast"	
2019	"Catch"	Doa Best Collection "Middle Coast"	
2019	"Nonoka" (野の花)	Doa Best Collection "Ballad Coast"	
2020	"Grasshopper"	Camp	
2020	"Camp"	Camp	
2020	"Ichinichi Hayai Christmas" (1日早いクリスマス)	Camp	
2022	"Wild Beast"	Cheers!	
2022	"Arigatou" (ありがとう)	Cheers!	
2022	"Ganbaranakutemo iindayo" (がんばらなくてもいいんだよ)	Cheers!	
2024	"Believe in Yourself"	Non-album single	

== Videography ==
=== DVD ===
List of home-video releases, with selected chart positions
Title	Album details	Peak positions
Title	Album details	JPN Oricon
doa 12th Winter Live "open_door" 2016	Released: May 24, 2017; Label: Giza Studio; Formats: DVD	46

== See also ==
- J-Rock
