= Natsuki Morikawa =

Japanese jazz singer

Natsuki Morikawa 森川七月
- Born: December 30, 1985 (age 40); Suita, Osaka, Japan
- Genres: Jazz, J-pop
- Occupation: singer
- Years active: 2006-
- Label: Giza Studio (2006-2023)
- Website: www.natsuki-morikawa.com

Natsuki Morikawa (森川七月) is a Japanese jazz singer under the Giza Studio label. In years 2012-2016 she was vocalist of group Natsuiro.

== Biography ==
In February 2006, she debuted with Hazuki Morita as Morikawa Natsuki and Morita Hazuki unit, released together one single Amazing Grace and one studio album Jazz Cover.

In 2008, she started her solo career as a soloist jazz singer. In March released first studio album & Jazz. In September, two covered songs Your song and Lullaby of Birdland appeared in Giza Studio's jazz compilation album Flavor Jazz: GIZA Jazz compilation vol.1. In October, she released second studio album P-Rhythm.

In March 2009, she released her third studio album Primavera. Two of her covered songs As Time Goes by and Feel Like Makin' Love appeared in Giza Studio's compilation Flavor Jazz: GIZA Jazz compilation vol.2

In years 2010-2012 Natsuki was the main personality of her radio program Shin-Kobe Jazz Monogatari at Radio Kansai.

In December 1, 2010, she had participated in Giza Studio's Christmas cover album "Christmas Non-Stop Carol" covering White Christmas by Irving Berlin.

In 2012, she formed pop group Natsuiro under Giza sub-label D-go. Their debut single was used in media as an opening theme for Anime television series Detective Conan. Four years later, the group went to the hiatus by announcement through their official website after lyricist left the band.

Since 2013, Natsuki regularly held live with instrumental band Sensation and recorded together full length album 4 Ever.

In 2016, Natsuki released her first cover album of Japanese songs J:Sentimental Cover.

In August 2018, Natsuki has launched her Official Twitter account.

== Discography ==
=== Studio album ===
No.	Release Day	Title	Rank	Code
1st	2008/3/26	& Jazz	X	GZCA-5127
2nd	2008/10/29	P-Rhythm	202	GZCA-5145
3rd	2009/03/25	PRIMAVERA	X	GZCA-5179
4th	2013/01/29	4 EVER	286	GZCA-5261
5th	2016/05/18	J:Sentimental Cover	164	GZCA-5275

== Magazine appearances ==
From Music Freak Magazine:

- March 2008 Vol.159
- May 2008 Vol.161
- October 2008 Vol.166
- February 2009 Vol.170
- March 2009 Vol.171
- April 2009 Vol.172
- May 2009 Vol.173
- June 2009 Vol.174
- August 2009 Vol.176
- November 2009 Vol.179

From Music freak magazine ES:

- June 2011 Vol.18
- August 2012 Vol.32
- January 2014 Vol.49
