= Giza Studio =

Japanese record label

Giza Studio ギザ ステューディオ
- Logo used since 2000

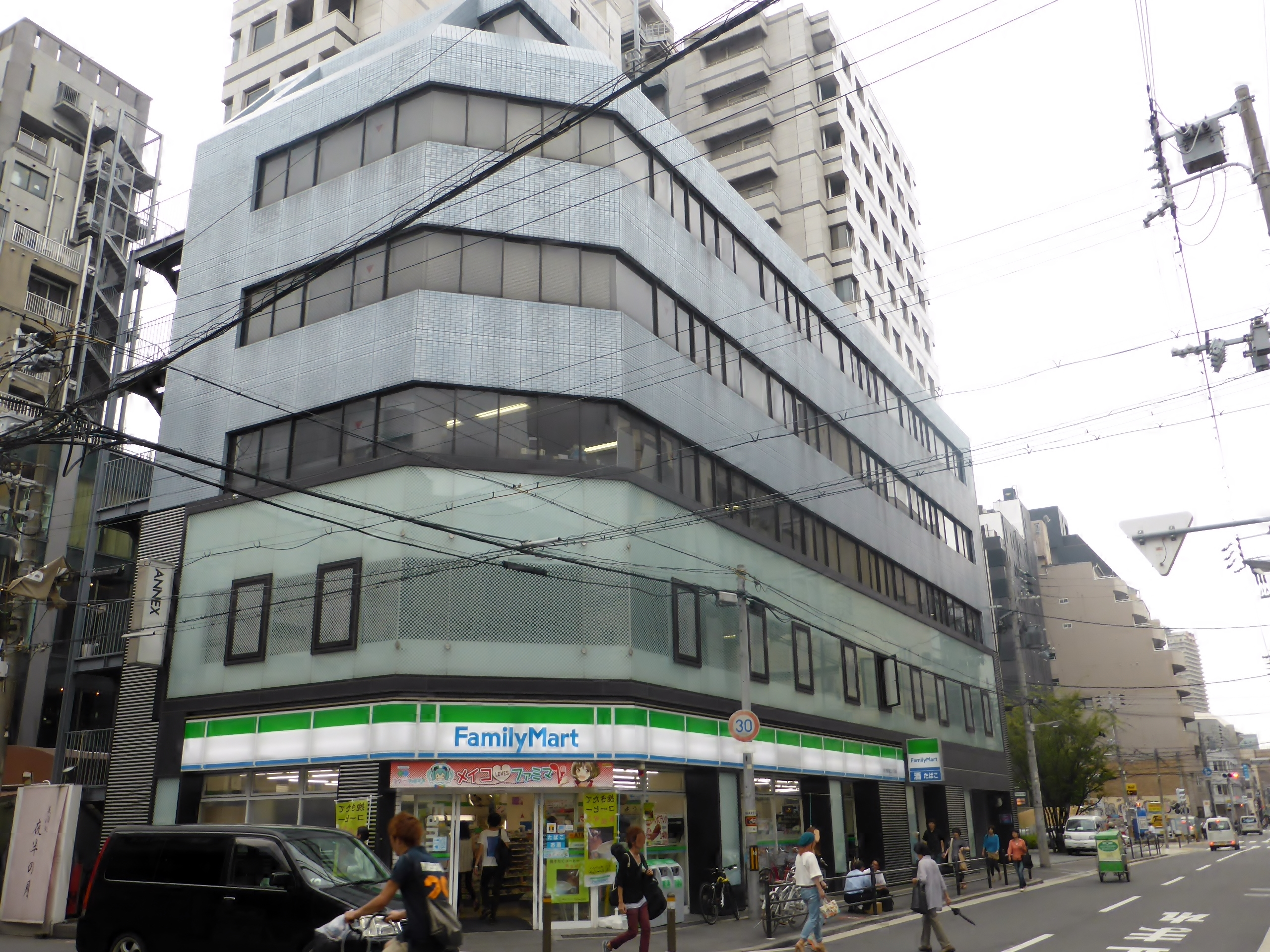
- Genre: Pop rock Indies; Jazz; Anime song
- Founded: September 1, 1998 (Japan); 2001 (United States)
- Founder: Daiko Nagato
- Headquarters: Horrie Hills building, 1-3-17 Kitahorie, Nishi-ku, Osaka, Osaka Prefecture Osaka, Japan; Los Angeles, California, U.S
- Key people: Daiko Nagato; Chiaki Nagato; Toshinori Masuda; Saitō Nobuhisa
- Total assets: 117 billion yen
- Number of employees: 95
- Parent: B Zone
- Website: Giza studio website

Giza Studio (ギザ ステューディオ, Giza Sutyūdio) is a Japanese record label, music production company and music publisher based in Osaka, founded in 1998 by music producer Daiko Nagato. Giza's artists have provided numerous opening and ending themes for Anime television series such as Meitantei Conan, Project ARMS, MÄR and Tantei Gakuen Q.

The Giza Studio started as an indie label under the name Garage Indies Zapping Association, but soon B Zone bought it as their sister label company and renamed it to only Giza. Since their commercial service launched on September 1, 1998, Giza Studio has been producing the following years commercially successful artists as Mai Kuraki, Garnet Crow and Rina Aiuchi Along with other Being Group's sister labels (Zain Records, Rooms Records, B-Gram Records, BMFC, Vermillion Records and Northern Music), the studio's main task is to create music productivity by hiring talented artists, composers and engineers.

In 2021, the singer Rina Aiuchi accused her former producer for sexual harassment and filed a lawsuit against talent agency Giza Studio, seeking 10 million yen, alleging that they did not protect her from harassment. Nagato himself did not admit it and claims the opposite of what he is accused of. In 2022, the official website has launched special statement toward lawsuit case which allows her to use her stage name once again. In 2023, Aiuchi accused her producer for the second time, however with the same results as previously of not admitting harassment action.

== Labels ==
- Giza Studio (GZCA) 1999-present
- Tent House (TCR) 1999-present
- O-Town Jazz (formerly known as Giza Jazz; GZCA) 1999-present
- D-Go (GZDC) 2012-present
- Crimzon (CCR) 2014- present

=== Inactive labels ===
- Garage Indies Zapping Association (ICR) 1999-2000
- Weeds (WRC) 1999
- Giza USA (GZUC) 2000-2001
- Styling Records (GZCS) 2002-2006
- Undown (UCR) 2003
- Blue-Z (GZCB) 2004
- Rozetta (RCR) 2014

== Artists ==
Notes: The Giza Studio official website has listed its active artist as of 2024.

=== Giza Studio ===
- Sard Underground
- d-project
- dps

=== D-Go ===
- Sensation
- Wands

=== Crimson ===
- Amai Bouryoku (甘い暴力)
- Shintenchi Kaibyaku Shudan: Zigzag (-真天地開闢集団-ジグザグ)

=== O-town Jazz ===
- Aoki Hikari (青紀ひかり)

== Former artists ==
Notes: The Giza Studio official website has listed its former artist under column Other Artists.

- Grass Arcade (1998–1999)
- 4D-JAM (1998–2001)
- New Cinema Tokage (1998–2002)
- Sweet Velvet (1999–2001)
- Jason Zodiac (1999–2002)
- Rumania Montevideo (1999–2002)
- Miho Komatsu (小松 未歩) (1999–2006)
- WAG (1999–2006)
- Mai Kuraki (倉木 麻衣) (1999–2007)
- Chika Yoshida (吉田 知加) (2000–2002)
- Nothin' but love (2000–2002)
- Soul Crusaders (2000–2002)
- Ramjet Pulley (2000–2003)
- Rina Aiuchi (愛内 里菜) (2000–2010)
- Garnet Crow (2000–2013)
- Les Mauvais Garçonnes (2001–2002)
- Mika Hase (長谷 実果) (2001–2002)
- Miki Matsuhashi (松橋 未樹) (2001–2003)
- Hikari Yamaguchi (山口 裕加里) (2001–2004)
- The★tambourines (2001–2009)
- Azumi Uehara (上原 あずみ) (2001–2010)
- Yumi Shizukusa (滴草 由実) (2002–2006)
- Akane Sugazaki (菅崎 茜) (2002–2007)
- U-ka Saegusa in dB (2002–2010)
- Aiko Kitahara (北原 愛子) (2002–2011)
- Shiori Takei (竹井 詩織里) (2003–2008)
- Hayami Kishimoto (岸本 早未) (2003–2008)
- Ai Takaoka (高岡 亜衣) (2003–2009)
- OOM (2005–2009)
- Chicago Poodle (2004-2023)
- Doa (2004-2023)
- Yuki Okazaki (岡崎雪) (2004-2023)
- Sayuri Iwata (岩田 さゆり) (2005–2008)
- Hiromi Haneda (羽田 裕美) (2005–2012)
- Hazuki Morita (森田 葉月) (2006–2009)
- Saeka Uura (宇浦冴香) (2006-2010)
- Natsuki Morikawa (森川七月) (2006-2023)
- Aya Kamiki (上木 彩矢) (2007–2009)
- Emi Hayakawa (早川 えみ) (2007–2010)
- Naifu (2007–2009)
- Gulliver Get (2007–2011)
- Kaori Hirata (平田 香織) (2008–2009)
- PINC INC (2008–2009)
- Saasa (さぁさ) (2008–2012)
- Caos Caos Caos (2008-2018)
- Marie Ueda (植田 真梨恵) (2008-2023)
- Sayo Kurihara (栗原 小夜) (2009–2010)
- Grram (2010–2015)
- Natsuiro (2012-2016)
- War Ed (2014–2015)
- Karina (2022-2023)

== Compilation albums ==
Album	Release	Ranking
Giza Studio R&B Respect Vol.1: Six Sisters Selection	5 December 2001	20
Giza Studio Masterpiece Blend 2001	19 December 2001	13
Giza studio Mai-K & Friends Hotrod Beach Party	17 July 2002	15
Giza Studio Masterpiece Blend 2002	18 December 2002	15
Giza Studio Masterpiece Blend 2003	17 December 2003	33
Giza Studio Masterpiece Blend 2004	2004	
Flavor Jazz: Giza Jazz compilation vol. 1	24 September 2008	x
Giza studio 10th Anniversary Masterpiece Blend: Love Side	24 December 2008	119
Giza studio 10th Anniversary Masterpiece Blend: Fun Side	24 December 2008	122
Flavor Jazz: Giza Jazz compilation vol. 2	30 September 2009	X
Christmas Non-Stop Carol	1 December 2010	71
Giza Studio Presents: Girls	12 October 2011	272

== See also ==
- B Zone
- List of record labels
- Hills Pan
