= Natsuiro =

- Origin: Japan
- Genres: J-Pop
- Years active: 2012–2016
- Label: D-Go (under Giza Studio)
- Website: http://natsuiro.jp/

Natsuiro (なついろ) was a Japanese music unit under Giza Studio in their sublabel D-Go.

== Members ==
- Natsuki Morikawa (森川七月) - vocalist
- Yoshimi Yamazaki (山崎好詩未) - keyboardist and lyricist
- Kana Kitagawa (北川加奈) - pianist

== Biography ==
- In 2012, jazz singer Natsuki Morikawa formed music unit with Yoshimi Yamazaki and Kana Kitagawa
- At same year, they've made major debut with single Kimi no Namida ni Koishiteru which was used as opening theme for anime Detective Conan
- In October 2016 through official website unit has announced hiatus from their music activities
  - Yoshimi has announced on her blog retiring from modeling and music activities, Natsuki continues with her solo jazz activities and Kana supports indies band Hachi as keyboardist
- During their career, they've released 2 singles and 2 studio albums

== Discography ==
=== Singles ===
	Release Day	Title	Peak
1st	2012/8/29	Kimi no Namida ni Konnani Koishiteru (君の涙にこんなに恋してる)	55
2nd	2013/6/19	Natsuno Taiyou no Sei ni shite (夏の太陽のせいにして)	X

== Albums ==
	Release Day	Title	Peak
1st	2012/11/7	Ano Natsuiro no Sora he to Tsuzuku (あの夏色の空へと続く)	171
2nd	2013/7/24	Summer Spur	251
