= B Zone =

Japanese entertainment conglomerate, record company

B ZONE, Inc.
- Logo used since 2023

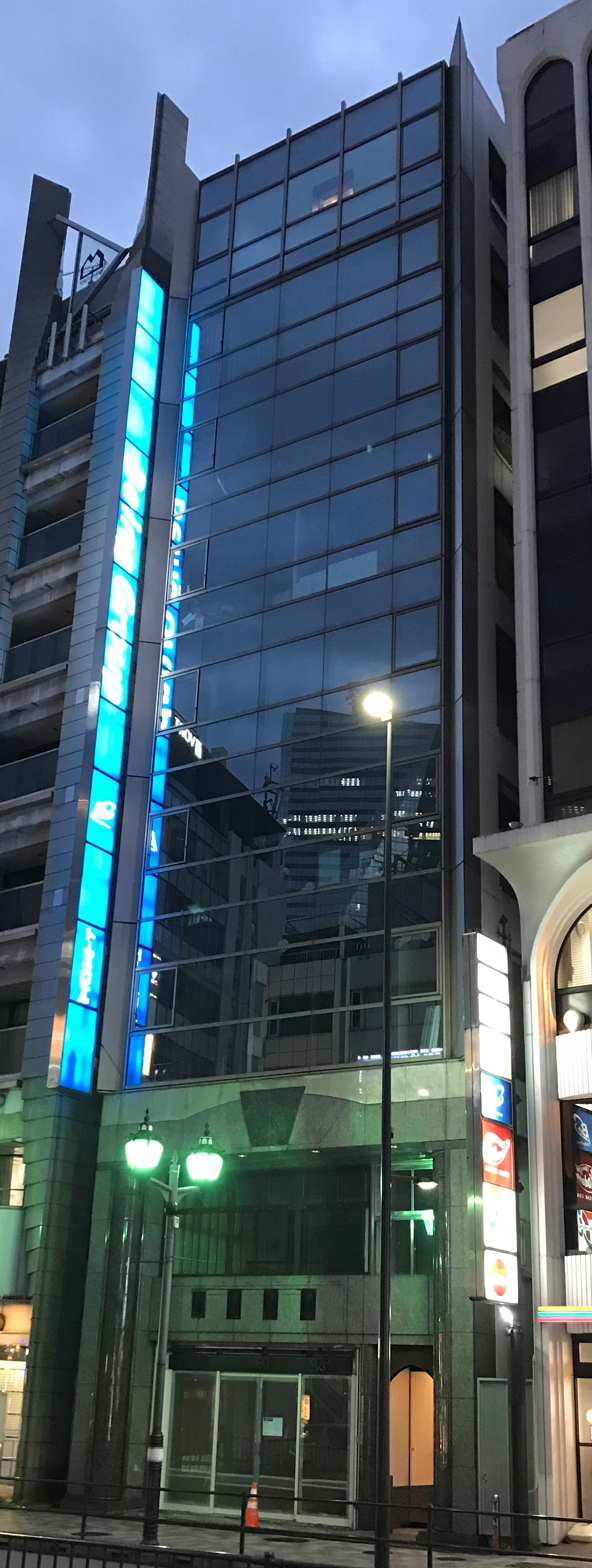
- Headquarters in Minato, Tokyo
- Native name: 株式会社B ZONE
- Romanized name: Kabushiki gaisha B Zone
- Formerly: Being, Inc. (1978-2023)
- Type: Kabushiki gaisha
- Industry: Music, artist development, record production, marketing, audio engineering
- Genre: Various
- Founded: November 1, 1978; 47 years ago
- Founder: Daiko Nagato
- Headquarters: Thomas Building, 5-2-2 Roppongi, Minato, Tokyo, Japan,
- Key people: Toshinori Masuda (President & CEO); Daiko Nagato (Major shareholder, Authorizer), Chiaki Nagato (Major Shareholder)
- Revenue: 1,000,000 yen
- Total assets: 759 billion yen
- Number of employees: Non-consolidated: 192; Consolidated 1097(as of 2024, including part-time workers and contracts)
- Subsidiaries: Vermillion Records; Zain Records; B.Gram-Records; Giza Studio; Northern Music; O-TOWN Jazz; Weedz; D-Go; B-Zone; Crimson; NiM Records; Kaikyō Record; Asistobe

YouTube information
- Channel: B Zone
- Years active: 2006–present
- Subscribers: 75.1 thousand
- Views: 58.7 million
- Last updated: February 26, 2025
- Website: BZONE.co.jp

B ZONE, Inc. (株式会社B ZONE, Kabushiki-gaisha B Zone) (a.k.a. B ZONE Group), formerly known as Being, Inc. (Note: 株式会社ビーイング, Kabushiki-gaisha Being) (a.k.a. Being Giza Group), is a Japanese private entertainment conglomerate and recording label based in Tokyo's Roppongi district, founded on November 1, 1978, by music producer Daiko Nagato. The company and its subsidiaries are the main supplier of theme music for the anime series Detective Conan. As of May 2023, over 130 theme songs have been supplied to the anime television series and movies by the B ZONE Group. On 4 April 2023, Being changed company name to B Zone.

== Labels ==
Nowadays production-based record company are no longer a rare thing, however the B ZONE Group has established a dedicated record company and label system in quick succession since 1991. Label companies that are part of the group are also subsequently owned by the holding company. It includes indie labels as well.

=== Major labels ===
- Vermillion Records (1990, previously named as BMG ROOMS) – formerly a joint venture with BMG Japan (now Sony Music Entertainment Japan)
- Zain Records (1991) – previously named as B.Jin)
- B.Gram-Records (1993) – formerly a joint venture with Nippon PolyGram (now Universal Music Japan)
- Giza Studio (1999–present)
- Northern Music (2007–present)
- O-TOWN Jazz (2012, previously named as Giza Jazz)
- D-Go (2012–present)
- B-Zone (2012–present, until 2023 named as Being)
- CRIMZON (2014–present)
- NiM Records (2019–present)
- Kaikyō Record (2019–present)
- Asistobe (2020–present)
- D5 Records (2024–present)

=== Indies labels ===
- Tent House (1999)
- zazzy (2005)
- magnifique (2008)

=== Former labels ===
- B-Vision (1993–2007)
- Amemura-O-Town Record (1997)
- BERG (1999)
- pure:infinity (2009–2014)
- Styling Records (2003)
- DAY TRACK (2003)
- White Cafe (2015)
- Honey Bee Records (2016)

== Subsidiaries ==
=== Music Publisher ===
- B Planning Office Co., Ltd.
- B Zone Music Co., Ltd. (formerly known as Being Publishing)
- Giza Music Co., Ltd.

=== Management Office ===
- Vermillion Co., Ltd. (B'z's personal office)
- Sensui (Izumi Sakai's personal office)
- Loop (Mai Kuraki's personal office)
- Giza Artist
- Zain Artist
- Ading
- White Dream
- Signaled Yellow
- Wormhole
- B Zone

=== Promotion ===
- Music Freak Magazine (MFM)

=== Music Production Company ===
- ZAIN PRODUCTS Co., Ltd.
- Giza Co., Ltd.

=== Studio Management ===
- REDWAY Co., Ltd.
- GREENDWAY Co., Ltd.

=== Design/Video ===
- Grunge Co., Ltd.
- Onto Co., Ltd.
- Susan Co., Ltd.

=== Internet related/distribution ===
- YouTube B Zone channel
- NicoNico Douga B Zone channel

=== Real-estate company ===
- B-Planets Co., Ltd.
- B Planning Co., Ltd.
- Atlas Co., Ltd.
- Luna Co., Ltd.
- Brilliant Estate Co., Ltd.
- Zeze Corporation Co., Ltd.
- Futaba Building Co., Ltd.
- Real Estate Co., Ltd.
- Bluesy Real Estate Co., Ltd.
- Dreamaps Co., Ltd.
- Celeste Co., Ltd.
- Chiakiss Co., Ltd.
- Weeds Co., Ltd.

=== Administrative/legal affairs ===
- Treasury Co., Ltd.
- Zaimu Co., Ltd.

=== Event hall/facilities ===
- Dojima River Forum (堂島リバーフォーラム)
- Dojima Forum Team
- Hills Pan Kōjō (hillsパン工場)
- Fuji Grand Imabari (フジグラン今治)
- Safa Fukuyama (サファ福山)

== Creators ==
Notes: The B ZONE Group official website has listed in the Japanese alphabetical order its "Music Creators".

- Aoi Yamazaki – lyricist, composer, vocal, chorus
- Akira Onozuka – composer, arranger, keyboard, piano
- Daisuke Ikeda (arranger) – composer, arranger, produce-direction
- Daria Kawashima – composer, lyricist, vocal, chorus
- Endcape-lyricist
- Genki Fukui – lyricist, composer, arranger
- Hiroki (Lilly sayonara) – lyricist, composer, vocal, chorus
- Hiroki Kawazoe – composer
- Hiroshi Imai – composer
- Hiya & Katsuma – composer, arranger
- Ichiri Shisui – composer
- Kaharu Maemura – composer, arranger
- Kan Natsumi – lyricist, composer
- Katsuma Togashi – composer, vocal, chorus
- Kazuki Katsuta – saxophonist
- Kazuki Kurosawa – composer, arranger, guitarist
- Kenta Takamori – lyricist, composer, arranger, guitarist, vocal, chorus
- Kōichi Naga – composer, arranger
- Kōji Goto – composer, arranger, guitarist, produce-direction
- Kōsuke Kataoka – composer
- Kousuke Ohshima (ex Wands) – composer, arranger, keyboard, piano, produce-direction
- Kurose Kazuichi – drummer
- Masaki Kureji – composer
- Masazumi Ozawa (ex. Pamelah) – composer, arranger, guitar, produce-direction
- Masanori Kobayashi – composer, arranger
- MissTY – composer, arranger, produce-direction
- Miwa Sasaki – lyricist
- Motoyoshi Hiyamizu – composer, arranger, guitarist
- Nao Kimura – composer
- Ocean94 – composer, arranger
- Rui (fade) – composer, arranger, produce-direction
- Ryoki Watanabe – composer, guitarist
- Ryoko Meguro – composer
- Ryosuke Nikamoto – bassist
- Shaoka – composer, arranger
- Taishi Izumida – composer, arranger
- Takahiro Minato – lyricist, composer, arranger
- Takashi Masuzaki – guitarist
- Toshiaki Ōta – composer
- Yoshifumi Kouchi – lyricist, composer, arranger
- Yuiko Tsubokura – vocal, chorus
- Yuki Takahara – vocal, chorus
- Yukito – composer
- Yurie Mochizuki – lyricist, composer, vocal, chorus

== Controversy ==
In June 2001, the company (then named Being) and its subsidiary B+U+M (now merged into Vermillion Records) was found to have failed to declare 840 million yen in income. They were acquitted after the investigation.
