= Mai Kuraki discography =

- Studio albums: 15
- Extended plays: 1
- Compilation albums: 7
- Singles: 56
- Video albums: 23
- Remix albums: 3
- Promotional singles: 16

The discography of Japanese singer Mai Kuraki consists of fifteen studio albums, six compilation albums, twenty-three video albums, three remix albums, fifty-six singles, and sixteen promotional singles. Kuraki debuted in 1999, while she was still in high school, through Giza Studio. The label initially marketed Kuraki in the United States under the name Mai K, and released the single "Baby I Like" (1999). However, the single was a commercial failure which prompted the label to send her back to Japan. There, they released her single "Love, Day After Tomorrow", which peaked at number two on the Oricon Singles Chart and was certified million by the Recording Industry Association of Japan (RIAJ). The second single, "Stay by My Side" became her first number one single on the chart. Kuraki's debut album, Delicious Way, topped the Oricon Albums Chart and was certified triple million by the RIAJ.

In 2001, her second album Perfect Crime was released, and it became another million seller, certified quadruple-platinum by the RIAJ. "Winter Bells", released in 2002 became her second number one single on the Oricon Singles Chart, and its parent album, Fairy Tale, topped the Albums Chart. It sold over 700,000 copies in Japan and earned a triple-platinum certification from the RIAJ. The albums If I Believe (2003), Wish You the Best (2004), Fuse of Love (2005), and Diamond Wave (2005) all charted within the top three of the Albums Chart. Both If I Believe and Wish You the Best peaked at number one on the Albums Chart. The former sold over 400,000 copies and was certified two-times platinum by the RIAJ while the latter sold more than 950,000 copies and was certified million by the RIAJ. Kuraki's next studio album release, One Life (2008) charted outside the top 10, peaking at number 14 on the Albums Chart. However, the follow-up to One Life titled Touch Me! (2009) peaked at number one, earning a gold certification. Her second compilation album All My Best (2009) sold over 250,000 copies in Japan and was certificated platinum. The follow-up albums Future Kiss (2010) and Over the Rainbow (2012) peaked at number 3 and 2, respectively, on the Oricon Albums Chart. Her third compilation album Mai Kuraki Best 151A: Love & Hope (2014) sold over 67,000 copies and was certificated gold. Her 11th album Smile (2017) sold only 29,000 copies in Japan and failed commercially but its follow-up single "Togetsukyo (Kimi Omou)" become her best-selling song in 2010's, and the best selling song by a solo female singer in 2017.

She has also collaborated with Tak Matsumoto of B'z on the single "Imitation Gold", which peaked at number one on the Oricon Singles Chart. In 2009, she was featured on the single "Sunao ni Ienakute" by Zard, a rearranged version of the band's 1991 song of the same title. The single peaked at number five on the Oricon Singles Chart.

== Albums ==
=== Studio albums ===
List of albums, with selected chart positions
Title	Album details	Peak positions				Sales (JPN)	Certifications
Title	Album details	JPN Oricon	JPN Billboard (Note: The Billboard Japan Hot Albums was established in June 2015.)	TWN (Note: The G-Music chart was established in July 2005 and only archives the top 20 releases.)	TWN East Asian (Note: The G-Music East Asian chart is a sub-chart, so releases listed may not have charted on the main top 20.) (Note: Positions taken from 2005 week 33 for Fuse of Love, 2006 week 31 for Diamond Wave, 2007 week 52 for One Life, 2009 week 3 for Touch Me!, 2010 week 47 for Future Kiss, and 2012 week 2 for Over the Rainbow.)	Sales (JPN)	Certifications
Delicious Way	Released: June 28, 2000; Label: Giza Studio; Format(s): CD, cassette, Digital Download, Streaming	1	—	—N/a	—N/a	3,530,000	JPN: 3× Million
Perfect Crime	Released: July 4, 2001; Label: Giza Studio; Format(s): CD, cassette, Digital Download, Streaming	1	—	—N/a	—N/a	1,320,000	JPN: Million (Note: Perfect Crime received a 4× Platinum certification for 1,600,000 copies, however the 4× Platinum threshold was depreciated in 2003.)
Secret of My Heart (as Mai-K)	Released: January 22, 2002; Label: Giza USA; Format(s): CD	—	—	—N/a	—N/a		
Fairy Tale	Released: October 23, 2002; Label: Giza Studio; Format(s): CD, cassette, digital download, streaming	1	—	—N/a	—N/a	731,000	JPN: Million
If I Believe	Released: July 9, 2003; Label: Giza Studio; Format(s): CD, cassette, digital download, streaming	1	—	—N/a	—N/a	445,000	JPN: 2× Platinum
Fuse of Love	Released: August 24, 2005; Label: Giza Studio; Format(s): CD, digital download, streaming	3	—	13	1	185,000	JPN: Gold
Diamond Wave	Released: August 2, 2006; Label: Giza Studio; Format(s): CD, digital download, streaming	3	—	13	2	132,000	JPN: Gold
One Life	Released: January 1, 2008; Label: Northern Music; Format(s): CD, digital download, streaming	14	— (Note: One Life did not enter the Billboard Japan Hot Albums Chart, but peaked at number 17 on the Billboard Japan Top Album Sales Chart.)	12	1	89,000	JPN: Gold
Touch Me!	Released: January 21, 2009; Label: Northern Music; Format(s): CD, digital download, streaming	1	— (Note: Touch Me! did not enter the Billboard Japan Hot Albums Chart, but peaked at number one on the Billboard Japan Top Album Sales Chart.)	12	1	90,000	JPN: Gold
Future Kiss	Released: November 17, 2010; Label: Northern Music; Format(s): CD, digital download, streaming	3	— (Note: Future Kiss did not enter the Billboard Japan Hot Albums Chart, but peaked at number three on the Billboard Japan Top Album Sales Chart.)	11	3	65,000	
Over the Rainbow	Released: January 11, 2012; Label: Northern Music; Format(s): CD, digital download, streaming	2	— (Note: Over the Rainbow did not enter the Billboard Japan Hot Albums Chart, but peaked at number two on the Billboard Japan Top Album Sales Chart.)	14	2	50,000	
Smile	Released: February 15, 2017; Label: Northern Music; Format(s): CD, digital download, streaming	4	7	—	—	30,000	
Kimi Omou: Shunkashūtō	Released: October 10, 2018; Label: Northern Music; Format(s): CD, digital download, streaming	3	4	—	—	30,000	
Let's Goal!: Barairo no Jinsei	Released: August 14, 2019; Label: Northern Music; Format(s): CD, digital download, streaming	3	5	—	—	29,000	
Unconditional Love	Released: October 27, 2021; Label: Northern Music; Format(s): CD, CD+DVD, digital download, streaming	4	6	—	—	21,000	
"—" denotes items which were released before the creation of the G-Music or Gaon Charts, or items that did not chart.

=== Compilation albums ===
List of albums, with selected chart positions
Title	Album details	Peak positions				Sales (JPN)	Certifications
Title	Album details	JPN Oricon	JPN Billboard	TWN	TWN East Asian (Note: Position was taken from 2009 week 37 for All My Best, 2014 week 46 for Best 151A.)	Sales (JPN)	Certifications
Wish You the Best	Released: January 1, 2004; Label: Giza Studio; Format(s): CD, cassette, digital download	1	—	—	—	956,000	JPN: Million
All My Best	Released: September 9, 2009; Label: Northern Music; Format(s): 2CD, 2CD+DVD, digital download, microSD, USB, MiniDisc, Cassette, LP	1	— (Note: All My Best did not enter the Billboard Japan Hot Albums Chart, but peaked at number one on the Billboard Japan Top Album Sales Chart.)	18	2	257,000	JPN: Platinum
Request Best "My & Mai"	Released: May, 2014 (Released exclusively on her fan club "Mai-K.net"); Label: Vermillion Records; Format(s): 2CD	—	—	—	—		
Mai Kuraki Best 151A: Love & Hope	Released: November 12, 2014; Label: Northern Music; Format(s): 2CD, 2CD+DVD, digital download	2	— (Note: Mai Kuraki Best 151A: Love & Hope did not enter the Billboard Japan Hot Albums Chart, but peaked at number two on the Billboard Japan Top Album Sales Chart.)	19	4	67,000	JPN: Gold
Mai Kuraki x Meitantei Conan Collaboration Best 21: Shinjitsu wa Itsumo Uta ni Aru!	Released: October 25, 2017; Label: Northern Music; Format(s): 2CD, 2CD+DVD, digital download, streaming	4	4	—	—	79,000	
Mai Kuraki Single Collection: Chance for You	Released: December 25, 2019; Label: Northern Music; Format(s): 4CD+2DVD, 5CD, 4CD, digital download	6	6	—	—	29,000	
Mai Kuraki B-Side Best: This Is Our Life	Released: December 10, 2025; Label: Northern Music; Format(s): 3CD, digital download	7	—	—	—	8,572	
Mai Kuraki x Meitantei Conan Collaboration Best 30: Kimi ga Itekuretakara, Uta ga Aru.	Released: November 11, 2026; Label: Northern Music; Format(s): 3CD+Blu-ray, 3CD, digital download	7	—	—	—	9,719	
"—" denotes items which were released before the creation of the G-Music or Gaon Charts, or items that did not chart.

=== Video albums ===
List of video albums, with selected chart positions and certifications
Title	Album details	Peak positions			Certifications
Title	Album details	JPN DVD	JPN Blu-ray	TWN (Note: Positions were taken from 2006 week 8 for Mai Kuraki Live Tour 2005 Like a Fuse of Live and Tour Documentary of "Chance for You", 2007 week 34 for Brilliant Cut: Mai Kuraki Live & Document, 2009 week 18 for Mai Kuraki Live Tour 2008 "Touch Me!", 2009 week 52 for 10th Anniversary Mai Kuraki Live Tour "Best", 2011 week 44 for Happy Happy Halloween Live 2010, 2011 week 49 for Strong Heart: From Mai Kuraki Premium Live One for All, All for One, 2012 week 33 for Mai Kuraki Live Tour 2012: Over the Rainbow, 2013 week 51 for Mai Kuraki Symphonic Collection in Moscow, 2013 week 27 for Mai Kuraki Symphonic Live: Opus 1, and 2014 week 13 for Mai Kuraki Symphonic Live: Opus 2.)	Certifications
First Cut	Released: November 8, 2000; Label: Giza Studio; Format(s): DVD, VHS	1	—	—	
Mai Kuraki & Experience First Live 2001 in Zepp Osaka	Released: September 19, 2001; Label: B-Vision; Format(s): VHS	—	—	—	
Mai Kuraki & Experience First Live Tour 2001 Eternal Moment	Released: November 21, 2001; Label: B-Vision; Format(s): DVD, VHS	2	—	—	
Mai Kuraki "Loving You..." Tour 2002 Final 2.27 in Yokohama Arena	Released: April 3, 2002; Label: B-Vision; Format(s): VHS	—	—	—	
Mai Kuraki "Loving You..." Tour 2002 Complete Edition	Released: May 15, 2002; Label: B-Vision; Format(s): DVD	2	—	—	
My Reflection	Released: January 17, 2004; Label: B-Vision; Format(s): DVD	1	—	—	JPN: Gold
Mai Kuraki 5th Anniversary Edition Grow, Step by Step	Released: January 5, 2005; Label: B-Vision; Format(s): DVD	7	—	—	
Mai Kuraki Live Tour 2005 Like a Fuse of Live and Tour Documentary of "Chance for You"	Released: February 22, 2006; Label: B-Vision; Format(s): DVD	6	—	2	
Brilliant Cut: Mai Kuraki Live & Document	Released: August 22, 2007; Label: Northern Music; Format(s): DVD	6	—	4	
Mai Kuraki Live Tour 2008 "Touch Me!"	Released: May 6, 2009; Label: Northern Music; Format(s): DVD	4	—	3	
10th Anniversary Mai Kuraki Live Tour "Best"	Released: December 23, 2009; Label: Northern Music; Format(s): DVD	10	—	8	
Happy Happy Halloween Live 2010	Released: October 19, 2010; Label: Northern Music; Format(s): DVD	9	—	4	
Mai Kuraki Premium Live One for All, All for One	Released: March 14, 2012; Label: Northern Music; Format(s): DVD	9	—	5	
Mai Kuraki Live Tour 2012: Over the Rainbow	Released: August 15, 2012; Label: Northern Music; Format(s): DVD	6	—	3	
Mai Kuraki Symphonic Collection in Moscow	Released: December 19, 2012; Label: Northern Music; Format(s): DVD+CD, 2DVD+CD	15	—	3	
Mai Kuraki Symphonic Live: Opus 1	Released: July 3, 2013; Label: Northern Music; Format(s): DVD	14	—	5	
Mai Kuraki Live Project 2013 "Re:"	Released: December 4, 2013; Label: Northern Music; Format(s): DVD	10	—	—	
Mai Kuraki Symphonic Live: Opus 2	Released: March 26, 2014; Label: Northern Music; Format(s): DVD	34	—	3	
15th Anniversary Mai Kuraki Live Project 2014 BEST “151A” ～Premium～	Released: May 27, 2015; Label: Northern Music; Format(s): DVD, Blu-ray	4	30	—	
Mai Kuraki Symphonic Live: Opus 3	Released: January 27, 2016; Label: Northern Music; Format(s): DVD, Blu-ray	40	45	—	
Mai Kuraki Live Project 2017: Sawage Live	Released: August 16, 2017; Label: Northern Music; Format(s): DVD, Blu-ray	9	9	—	
Mai Kuraki Live Project 2018 "Red It be: Kimi Omou Shunkashūtō"	Released: November 27, 2019; Label: Northern Music; Format(s): DVD, Blu-ray	18	21	—	
20th Anniversary Mai Kuraki Live Project 2019 "Let's Goal!: Barairo no Jinsei"	Released: June 24, 2020; Label: Northern Music; Format(s): DVD, Blu-ray	12	17	—	
Mai Kuraki Live Project 2021 "Unconditional Love"	Released: December 8, 2022; Label: Northern Music; Format(s): DVD, Blu-ray	16	18	—	
Mai Kuraki Premium Symphonic Concert 2022	Released: November 15, 2023; Label: Northern Music; Format(s): DVD+CD, Blu-ray+CD	5	12	—	
25th Anniversary Mai Kuraki Live Project 2024 "Be Alright!"	Released: October 25, 2025; Label: Northern Music; Format(s): DVD, Blu-ray	TBA			
"—" denotes items which were released before the creation of the G-Music chart, or items that did not chart.

=== Remix albums ===
List of remix albums, with selected chart positions
Title	Album details
Cool City Production Vol. 2 "Mai-K's Re-Mix"	Released: August 18, 2001; Label: Tent House; Format(s): DVD
Cool City Production Vol. 3 "Mai-K's Club Side"	Released: April 24, 2002; Label: Tent House; Format(s): CD
Cool City Production Vol. 4 "Mai-K" Feel Fine!	Released: October 23, 2002; Label: Tent House; Format(s): CD

== Extended plays ==
List of EPs, with selected chart positions
Title	EP details	Peak positions		Sales
Title	EP details	JPN Oricon	JPN Billboard	Sales
Forever for You	Released: July 3, 2024; Label: Northern Music; Format(s): CD, digital download, streaming	3	4	JPN: 11,528

== Singles ==
=== As lead artist ===
List of singles, with selected chart positions
Title	Year	Peak chart positions					Sales (JPN)	Certifications	Album
Title	Year	JPN Oricon	JPN Hot (Note: The Japan Hot 100 was established in February 2008.) (Note: Sources for chart positions are as follows: "Puzzle", "Revive", "Beautiful", "Love, Day After Tomorrow", "Eien Yori Nagaku", "Summer Time Gone", "1000 Mankai no Kiss", "Mō Ichido", "Your Best Friend", "Strong Heart", "Koi ni Koishite", "Try Again", "Wake Me Up", "Muteki na Heart", "Kimi to Koi no Mama...".)	JPN Anime (Note: The Billboard Japan Hot Animation was established in December 2010.)	TWN	TWN East Asian (Note: Positions taken from 2006 week 50 for "Shiroi Yuki", 2008 week 27 for "Ichibyōgoto ni Love for You", 2008 week 47 for "24 Xmas Time", 2009 week 13 for "Puzzle", 2009 week 23 for "Beautiful", 2010 week 11 for "Eien Yori Nagaku/Drive Me Crazy", 2010 week 35 for "Summer Time Gone", 2011 week 12 for "1000 Mankai no Kiss", 2011 week 44 for "Your Best Friend", 2012 week 33 for "Koi ni Koishite", and 2013 week 6 for "Try Again".)	Sales (JPN)	Certifications	Album
"Baby I Like" (as Mai-K)	1999	—	—	—	—	—			Secret of My Heart
"Love, Day After Tomorrow"	1999	2	63	—	—	—	CD: 1,385,000; DL: 100,000+	JPN (physical): Million; JPN (digital): Gold	Delicious Way
"Stay by My Side"	2000	1	—	—	—	—	CD: 922,000	JPN (physical): 3× Platinum (Note: Received a 2× Platinum certification for 800,000 copies, however the 2× Platinum threshold was redefined as 500,000 copies in 2003.)	Delicious Way
"Secret of My Heart"	2000	2	— (Note: "Secret of My Heart" did not enter the Billboard Japan Hot 100 Chart, but peaked at number 79 on the Billboard Japan Adult Contemporary Airplay Chart.)	—	—	—	CD: 969,000; DL: 100,000+	JPN (physical): Million; JPN (digital): Gold	Delicious Way
"Never Gonna Give You Up"	2000	2	—	—	—	—	CD: 434,000	JPN (physical): Platinum	Delicious Way
"Simply Wonderful"	2000	2	—	—	—	—	CD: 385,000	JPN (physical): Gold	Wish You the Best
"Reach for the Sky"	2000	3	—	—	—	—	CD: 468,000	JPN (physical): Platinum	Perfect Crime
"Tsumetai Umi"	2001	2	—	—	—	—	CD: 356,000	JPN (physical): Platinum	Perfect Crime
"Start in My Life"	2001	2	—	—	—	—	CD: 356,000	JPN (physical): Platinum	Perfect Crime
"Stand Up"	2001	2	—	—	—	—	CD: 476,000	JPN (physical): Platinum	Perfect Crime
"Always"	2001	2	—	—	—	—	CD: 220,000	JPN (physical): Gold	Perfect Crime
"Can't Forget Your Love"	2001	2	—	—	—	—	CD: 180,000	JPN (physical): Gold	Fairy Tale
"Perfect Crime" (Single Edit)	2001	2	—	—	—	—	CD: 180,000	JPN (physical): Gold	Perfect Crime
"Winter Bells"	2002	1	—	—	—	—	CD: 258,000	JPN (physical): Gold	Fairy Tale
"Feel Fine!"	2002	2	—	—	—	—	CD: 452,000	JPN (physical): Platinum	Fairy Tale
"Like a Star in the Night"	2002	2	—	—	—	—	CD: 120,000	JPN (physical): Gold	Fairy Tale
"Make My Day"	2002	2	—	—	—	—	CD: 108,000	JPN (physical): Gold	If I Believe
"Time After Time (Hana Mau Machi de)"	2003	3	100	—	—	—	CD: 144,000	JPN (physical): Gold	If I Believe
"Kiss"	2003	3	—	—	—	—	CD: 112,000	JPN (physical): Gold	If I Believe
"Kaze no La La La"	2003	3	—	—	—	—	CD: 96,000	JPN (physical): Gold	If I Believe
"Ashita e Kakeru Hashi"	2004	3	—	—	—	—	CD: 91,000	JPN (physical): Gold	Fuse of Love
"Love, Needing"	2005	5	—	—	—	—	CD: 69,000	JPN (physical): Gold	Fuse of Love
"Dancing"	2005	5	—	—	—	—	CD: 57,000	JPN (physical): Gold	Fuse of Love
"P.S My Sunshine"	2005	8	—	—	—	—	CD: 42,000		Fuse of Love
"Growing of My Heart"	2005	7	—	—	—	—	CD: 62,000		Diamond Wave
"Best of Hero"	2006	5	—	—	—	—	CD: 58,000		Diamond Wave
"Diamond Wave"	2006	7	—	—	—	—	CD: 31,000		Diamond Wave
"Shiroi Yuki"	2006	4	—	—	—	20	CD: 44,000		One Life
"Season of Love"	2007	6	—	—	—	—	CD: 31,000		One Life
"Silent Love (Open My Heart)"	2007	9	—	—	—	—	CD: 31,000		One Life
"Be With U"	2007	9	—	—	—	—	CD: 31,000		One Life
"Yume ga Saku Haru"	2008	5	12	—	—	—	CD: 29,000		Touch Me!
"You and Music and Dream"	2008	5	—	—	—	—	CD: 29,000		Touch Me!
"Ichibyōgoto ni Love for You"	2008	7	18	—	15	3	CD: 30,000		Touch Me!
"24 Xmas Time"	2008	7	7	—	18	2	CD: 27,000		Touch Me!
"Puzzle"	2009	3	6	—	20	6	CD: 48,000		All My Best
"Revive"	2009	3	55	—	20	6	CD: 48,000		Future Kiss
"Beautiful"	2009	2	5	—	—	3	CD: 36,000		Future Kiss
"Eien Yori Nagaku"	2010	4	6	—	15	7	CD: 30,000		Mai Kuraki Single Collection: Chance for You
"Drive Me Crazy"	2010	4	—	—	15	7	CD: 30,000		Future Kiss
"Summer Time Gone"	2010	4	8	—	13	4	CD: 33,000		Future Kiss
"1000 Mankai no Kiss"	2011	4	9	—	14	3	CD: 25,000		Over the Rainbow
"Mō Ichido"	2011	7	29	—	—	—	CD: 23,000		Over the Rainbow
"Your Best Friend"	2011	6	10	2	14	3	CD: 25,000		Over the Rainbow
"Strong Heart"	2011	4 (Note: Charted on the DVD chart.)	63	—	3	—	DVD: 20,000		Over the Rainbow
"Koi ni Koishite"	2012	7	13	2	—	7	CD 22,000		Mai Kuraki Best 151A: Love & Hope
"Special Morning Day to You"	2012	7	—	—	—	7	CD 22,000		Mai Kuraki Best 151A: Love & Hope
"Try Again"	2013	6	9	1	—	3	CD: 20,000		Mai Kuraki Best 151A: Love & Hope
"Wake Me Up"	2014	2	75	—	—	—	DVD: 12,000		Mai Kuraki Best 151A: Love & Hope
"Muteki na Heart"	2014	5	6	3	—	—	CD: 30,000		Mai Kuraki Best 151A: Love & Hope
"Stand by You"	2014	5	—	—	—	—	CD: 30,000		Mai Kuraki Best 151A: Love & Hope
"Yesterday Love"	2017	3 (Note: Charted on the Blu-ray chart.)	—	14	—	—	DVD/Blu-ray: 6,000		Smile
"Togetsukyo (Kimi Omou)"	2017	5	2	1	—	—	CD: 76,000; DL: 250,000+	JPN (digital): Platinum	Mai Kuraki x Meitantei Conan Collaboration Best 21: Shinjitsu wa Itsumo Uta ni aru!
"Kimi to Koi no Mama de Owarenai Itsumo Yume no Mama ja Irarenai"	2019	4	13	4	—	—	CD: 37,000		Let's Goal!: Barairo no Jinsei
"Barairo no Jinsei"	2019	4	— (Note: "Barairo no Jinsei" did not enter the Billboard Japan Hot 100 Chart, but peaked at number 15 on the Billboard Japan Top Download Songs Chart.)	19	—	—	CD: 37,000		Let's Goal!: Barairo no Jinsei
"Zero kara Hajimete"	2021	1	— (Note: "Zero kara Hajimete" did not enter the Billboard Japan Hot 100 Chart, but peaked at number 80 on the Billboard Japan Top Download Songs Chart.)	—	—	—	DVD: 9,000		Unconditional Love
"—" denotes items which were released before the creation of the G-Music or Billboard charts, or items that did not chart.

=== As a featured artist ===
List of singles, with selected chart positions
Title	Year	Peak chart positions			Sales (JPN)	Certifications	Album
Title	Year	JPN Oricon	JPN Hot 100 (Note: Sources for chart positions are as follows: "Sunao no Ienakute" and "Dōshite Suki Nandarō".)	TWN East Asian (Note: Position taken from 2009 week 22 for "Sunao ni Ienakute".)	Sales (JPN)	Certifications	Album
"I Just Can't Stop Loving You" (Experience featuring Mai Kuraki)	2003	—	—	—			Experience 2
"Imitation Gold" (Tak Matsumoto featuring Mai Kuraki)	2003	1	—	—	81,000	JPN (physical): Gold	The Hit Parade
"Sunao ni Ienakute" (Zard featuring Mai Kuraki)	2009	5	19	13	50,000		Zard Forever Best: 25th Anniversary
"Doushite Suki Nandarou" (Nerdhead featuring Mai.K)	2011	15	65	—	9,000		Behind the Truth
"Hitori, Hitotsu" (As a part of a group of 16 voices)	2015	123	—	—			Non-album single
"—" denotes items which were released before the creation of the G-Music or Billboard charts, or items that did not chart.

=== Promotional singles ===
Title	Year	Peak chart positions	Sales	Album
Title	Year	JPN Hot 100 (Note: Sources for chart positions are as follows: "Watashi no, Shiranai, Watashi.", "Future Kiss", and "Kotoba ni Dekinai Hodo ni Suki na no ni".)	Sales	Album
"Come On! Come On!"	2001	—		Perfect Crime
"Chance for You" (Cinema version)	2010	—		Mai Kuraki Single Collection: Chance for You
"Anata ga Irukara" (solo or Fantasy on Ice 2011 version with Shizuka Arakawa)	2011	—		Mai Kuraki Best 151A: Love & Hope
"Serendipity" (Solor or featuring Sensation)	2015	—		Smile
"Sawage Life"	2016	—		Smile
"We Are Happy Women"	2018	— (Note: "We Are Happy Women" did not enter the Billboard Japan Hot 100 Chart, but peaked at number 93 on the Billboard Japan Top Download Songs Chart.)		Kimi Omou: Shunkashūtō
"Do It!"	2018	— (Note: "Do It!" did not enter the Billboard Japan Hot 100 Chart, but peaked at number 74 on the Billboard Japan Top Download Songs Chart.)		Kimi Omou: Shunkashūtō
"Light Up My Life"	2018	— (Note: "Light Up My Life" did not enter the Billboard Japan Hot 100 Chart, but peaked at number 59 on the Billboard Japan Top Download Songs Chart.)		Kimi Omou: Shunkashūtō
"Koyoi wa Yume wo Misasete"	2018	—		Kimi Omou: Shunkashūtō
"Can You Feel My Heart"	2021	— (Note: "Can You Feel My Heart" did not enter the Billboard Japan Hot 100 Chart, but peaked at number 39 on the Billboard Japan Top Download Songs Chart.)		Unconditional Love
"Hitori ja Nai"	2021	—		Unconditional Love
"Proof of Being Alive" (Note: "Proof of Being Alive" was released to the streaming platforms exclusively in China ahead of the release of its parental album, Unconditional Love.)	2021	—		Unconditional Love
"Veronica"	2021	—		Unconditional Love
"Secret, Voice of My Heart"	2022	— (Note: "Secret, Voice of My Heart" did not enter the Billboard Japan Hot 100 Chart, but peaked at number 32 on the Billboard Japan Top Download Songs Chart.)	JPN (DL): 2,855	Forever for You
"Unraveling Love (Sukoshi no Yūki)"	2023	— (Note: "Unraveling Love (Sukoshi no Yuūki)" did not enter the Billboard Japan Hot 100 Chart, but peaked at number 37 on the Oricon Weekly Download Songs Chart.)	JPN (DL): 1,629	Forever for You
"You & I"	2023	— (Note: "You & I" did not enter the Billboard Japan Hot 100 Chart, but peaked at number 52 on the Billboard Japan Top Download Songs Chart.)		Forever for You
"Relax: What a Wonderful World"	2025	— (Note: "Relax: What a Wonderful World" did not enter the Billboard Japan Hot 100 Chart, but peaked at number 68 on the Billboard Japan Top Download Songs Chart.)		Mai Kuraki B-Side Best: This Is Our Life
"Towa: Towa ni Kaze ni Noru"	2026	— (Note: "Towa: Towa ni Kaze ni Noru" did not enter the Billboard Japan Hot 100 Chart, but peaked at number 10 on the Billboard Japan Top Download Songs Chart.)		Mai Kuraki x Meitantei Conan Collaboration Best 30: Kimi ga Itekuretakara, Uta ga Aru.
"Halleluiah"	2026	— (Note: "Halleluiah" did not enter the Billboard Japan Hot 100 Chart, but peaked at number 17 on the Billboard Japan Top Download Songs Chart.)		Mai Kuraki x Meitantei Conan Collaboration Best 30: Kimi ga Itekuretakara, Uta ga Aru.
"Ai de Zenbu Dakishimete Aishite"	2026	— (Note: "Ai de Zenbu Dakishimete Aishite" did not enter the Billboard Japan Hot 100 Chart, but peaked at number 31 on the Billboard Japan Top Download Songs Chart.)		Mai Kuraki x Meitantei Conan Collaboration Best 30: Kimi ga Itekuretakara, Uta ga Aru.
"—" denotes items which were released before the creation of the Billboard or RIAJ charts, or items that did not chart.

== Other charted songs ==
Title	Year	Peak chart positions			Album
Title	Year	JPN Hot 100 (Note: Sources for chart positions are as follows: "Watashi no, Shiranai, Watashi.", "Future Kiss", and "Kotoba ni Dekinai Hodo ni Suki na no ni".)	JPN Adult (Note: Sources for chart positions are as follows: "Touch Me!","Secret Lover")	JPN RIAJ Digital Track Chart (Note: The RIAJ Digital Track Chart is a depreciated chart that ran from 2009 until early 2012 and tracked full-length cellphone downloads.) (Note: Sources for chart positions are as follows: "Tomorrow Is the Last Time", "Future Kiss", and "Kotoba ni Dekinai Hodo ni Suki na no ni".)	Album
"Touch Me!"	2009	16	9	—	Touch Me!
"Secret Lover"	2009	—	86	—	Touch Me!
"Watashi no, Shiranai, Watashi."	2009	20	23	—	All My Best
"Future Kiss"	2010	30	27	91	Future Kiss
"Tomorrow Is the Last Time"	2010	—	—	42	Future Kiss
"—" denotes items which were released before the creation of the Billboard or RIAJ charts, or items that did not chart.

== Other appearances ==
List of non-studio album or guest appearances that feature Mai Kuraki
Title	Year	Other performer(s)	Album
"I'll Be There"	2001		Giza Studio R&B Respect Vol.1: Six Sisters Selection
"What Can I Do"	2002	Michael Africk	Patapata Hikōsen no Bōken: Original Soundtrack
"Don't Worry Baby"	2002		Giza Studio Mai-K & Friends Hotrod Beach Party
"The Frozen Sea"	2002	Aika Ohno	Secret Garden
"Remember the Time"	2003	Experience	Experience I
"My Story, Your Song"	2003	Stefanie Sun	To Be Continued...
"Kotoba ni Dekinai Hodo Suki nanoni"	2011	Nerdhead	Behind the Truth
"Close Christmas"	2013	Ikurō Fujiwara	Quatre Saisons Series "Scénario de la Saison" –Automne-"
"Hirari Maichiru Hana no yo ni"	2017	Breakerz	X
"I Lost"	2021	Breakerz	With You
"Blue Light Yokohama"	2024	Tak Matsumoto	The Hit Parade II

== Songwriting credits ==
List of songs written or co-written for other artists, showing year released and album name
Title	Year	Artist(s)	Album
"Just Believe You"	2020	All at Once	Just Believe You EP
