= My Reflection (album) =

- DVD cover

Video by Mai Kuraki
- Released: January 7, 2004
- Genre: J-Pop
- Length: 75 minutes (Disc one); 104 minutes (Disc two)
- Label: B-Vision
- Producer: KANONJI

Mai Kuraki chronology
Mai Kuraki "Loving You…" Tour 2002 Complete Edition (2002)	My Reflection (2004)	Mai Kuraki 5th Anniversary Edition Grow, Step by Step (2005)

My Reflection is the sixth video album by Japanese recording artist Mai Kuraki. It was released on DVD format on January 7, 2004 by B-Vision. The album consists of two discs: disc one includes Kuraki's music videos and making videos, while disc two includes materials from recordings from Kuraki's concerts during her Mai Kuraki Fairy Tale Tour 02-03 and other performances. The album was originally scheduled to be released on December 24, 2003; however, it was delayed for a technical reason.

Upon its release, My Reflection met with a commercial success, debuting atop on the Oricon Weekly Video Albums Chart. The album became the twelfth best-selling video album (DVD) of 2004 in Japan.

== Track listing ==
Disc one: Clip Selection
No.	Title	Length
1.	"Opening Movie"
2.	"Reach for the Sky" (Music video)
3.	"Tsumetai Umi" (Music video)
4.	"Stand Up" (Music video)
5.	"Always" (Music video)
6.	"Perfect Crime" (Album promotion video)
7.	"Making of Scene of Clips"
8.	"Can't Forget Your Love" (Music video)
9.	"Winter Bells" (Music video)
10.	"Feel Fine!" (Music video)
11.	"Like a Star in the Night" (Music video)
12.	"Make My Day" (Music video)
13.	"Fairy Tale" (Album promotion video)
14.	"Making of Scene of Clips"
15.	"Time After Time (Hana Mau Machi de)" (Music video)
16.	"Kiss" (Music video)
17.	"Kaze no La La La" (Music video)
18.	"Same" (Music video)
19.	"If I Believe" (Album promotion video)
20.	"If I Believe" (Music video)
21.	"Discography"

Disc two: Live Selection
No.	Title	Length
1.	"Fairy Tale (My Last Teenage Wish)"
2.	"Ride on Time"
3.	"Delicious Way/Never Gonna Give You Up" (Medley)
4.	"Stay by My Side/Secret of My Heart" (Medley)
5.	"Fantasy"
6.	"Like a Star in the Night"
7.	"Give Me One More Chance/Everything's All Right/Love, Day After Tomorrow" (Medley)
8.	"Feel Fine!"
9.	"Stand Up"
10.	"Always"
11.	"Kaze no La La La"
12.	"Time After Time (Hana Mau Machi de)"
13.	"Stand Up"
14.	"Baby I Like/Stepping Out" (Medley)
15.	"Thankful"
16.	"If I Believe"
17.	"Just a Little Bit"
18.	"Stay by My Side" (Voices version)
19.	"Tour documentary"

== Charts ==
=== Weekly charts ===
Chart (2004)	Peak position
Japanese Video Albums (Oricon)	1

=== Yearly charts ===
Chart (2004)	Peak position
Japanese Albums (Oricon)	12
