= All My Best (Mai Kuraki album) =

- Standard edition/digital download cover

Greatest hits album by Mai Kuraki
- Released: September 9, 2009
- Recorded: 1999–2009
- Genres: Pop, R&B
- Length: Disc 1: 71:26; Disc 2: 72:19
- Label: Northern Music
- Producers: Mai Kuraki (Executive producer), Daiko Nagato,

Mai Kuraki chronology
Touch Me! (2009)	All My Best (2009)	Future Kiss (2010)

Singles from All My Best
- 1. "Puzzle" Released: April 1, 2009; 2. "Beautiful" Released: June 10, 2009

All My Best is the second greatest hits album by Japanese pop and R&B singer-songwriter, Mai Kuraki. It was released on September 9, 2009, to commemorate her tenth anniversary in the music business. The album was issued in seven formats: a regular 2CD, a limited 2CD+DVD, a limited microSD, a USB flash drive, a MiniDisc, a compact cassette and an LP album. The album debuted at the top of the Japanese Oricon weekly album chart with sales over 137,050.

== Singles ==
To promote the album, two singles were released: "Puzzle/Revive" and "Beautiful". On the Oricon single chart "Puzzle/Revive" entered the top 3, becoming Kuraki's first single since "Ashita e Kakeru Hashi" (明日へ架ける橋, "Bridge to Tomorrow") in 2004 to do so. "Puzzle" was the ending theme song for the thirteenth Detective Conan movie Detective Conan: The Raven Chaser. Unlike "Puzzle", "Revive" was not on the album. "Beautiful" was used as the image song for the cosmetic company Kose's Coseport Salon Style. The single ranked higher than "Puzzle/Revive" debuting at No. 2, which extended Kuraki's record as the only female solo artist to have all 32 of her singles in the Top 10 since her debut.

== Commercial performance ==
On the release day of All My Best in Japan, the album took the number one position on the Oricon daily album chart, selling 38,000 copies. On the weekly chart issue dated September 21, the album was No. 1 with sales a little over 137,050, becoming Kuraki's second number-one album of 2009. The album also debuted at the top of the Billboard Japan Top Albums chart. In Taiwan, the album achieved moderate success debuting at numbers nine and seven, on the international and J-pop charts respectively. On the J-Pop chart, the album peaked at number five. With 0.51% of sales on the Taiwanese Combo chart the album debuted at number eighteen.

== Track listing ==
All lyrics are written by Mai Kuraki, except "Never Gonna Give You Up" which was co-written with Michael Africk.

Disc 1
No.	Title	Music	Arranger(s)	Length
1.	"Watashi no, Shiranai, Watashi. (わたしの、しらない、わたし。, The Me I Do Not Know.)"	Yue Mochizuki	Daisuke Ikeda, Shun Sato	4:04
2.	"Love, Day After Tomorrow" (from album Delicious Way)	Aika Ohno	Cybersound	4:05
3.	"Stay by My Side" (from album Delicious Way)	Aika Ohno	Cybersound	4:26
4.	"Secret of My Heart" (from album Delicious Way)	Aika Ohno	Cybersound	4:26
5.	"Never Gonna Give You Up" (from album Delicious Way)	Michael Africk, Miguel Sa Pessoa, Perry Geyer	Michael Africk, Miguel Sa Pessoa, Perry Geyer	4:01
6.	"Simply Wonderful: Radio Edit" (from album Wish You the Best)	Aika Ohno	Cybersound	3:54
7.	"Reach for the Sky" (from album Perfect Crime)	Aika Ohno	Cybersound	4:49
8.	"Start in My Life" (from album Perfect Crime)	Aika Ohno	Cybersound	5:09
9.	"Tsumetai Umi" (from album Perfect Crime)	Aika Ohno	Cybersound	4:41
10.	"Double Rainbow" (from single "Stand Up")	Yoko Blaqstone	Yoko Black. Stone	4:43
11.	"Stand Up" (from album Perfect Crime)	Akihito Tokunaga	Akihito Tokunaga	4:40
12.	"Always" (from album Perfect Crime)	Aika Ohno	Cybersound	4:09
13.	"Perfect Crime" (from album Perfect Crime)	Akihito Tokunaga	Akihito Tokunaga, Daisuke Ikeda	4:38
14.	"Can't Forget Your Love" (from album Fairy Tale)	Aika Ohno	Cybersound, Akihito Tokunaga	5:29
15.	"Winter Bells" (from album Fairy Tale)	Akihito Tokunaga	Akihito Tokunaga	4:39
16.	"Key to My Heart" (from album Fairy Tale)	Aika Ohno	Cybersound	3:33

All lyrics are written by Mai Kuraki, except "Baby I Like", which was written by Yoko Black. Stone.

Disc 2
No.	Title	Music	Arranger(s)	Length
1.	"Baby I Like" (from album Secret of My Heart)	Yoko Black. Stone	Cybersound	4:22
2.	"Puzzle"	Yue Mochizuki, Takahiro Hiraga	Masazumi Ozawa	3:58
3.	"Beautiful"	Song Yang Ha	Daisuke Ikeda	4:32
4.	"Touch Me!" (from album Touch Me!)	Yue Mochizuki	Takahiro Hiraga	5:11
5.	"Ichibyōgoto ni Love for You" (from album Touch Me!)	Aika Ohno	Cybersound	3:59
6.	"Be With U" (from album One Life)	Akihito Tokunaga	Cybersound	4:56
7.	"Silent Love: Open My Heart" (from album One Life)	Daisuke "Dais" Miyachi, Yuichi Ohno	Daisuke "Dais" Miyachi, Yuichi Ohno	4:25
8.	"Aitakute... (会いたくて..., I Want to See You...)" (from album Diamond Wave)	Akihito Tokunaga	Akihito Tokunaga	4:32
9.	"Shiroi Yuki" (from album One Life)	Aika Ohno	Daisuke Ikeda	4:49
10.	"Best of Hero (ベスト オブ ヒーロー, Besuto obu Hīro)" (from album Diamond Wave)	Akihito Tokunaga	Akihito Tokunaga	4:14
11.	"Growing of My Heart" (from album Diamond Wave)	Aika Ohno	Takeshi Hayama	4:22
12.	"Ashita e Kakeru Hashi (明日へ架ける橋, Bridge to Tomorrow)" (from album Fuse of Love)	Akihito Tokunaga	Daisuke Ikeda, Akihito Tokunaga	3:59
13.	"Time After Time: Hana Mau Machi de (Theater Version)" (from album If I Believe)	Aika Ohno	Daisuke Ikeda, Cybersound	4:12
14.	"Kaze no Lalala" (from album If I Believe)	Michiya Haruhata	Cybersound	4:22
15.	"Like A Star in the Night" (from album Fairy Tale)	Aika Ohno	Akihito Tokunaga, Strings arrangement： Daisuke Ikeda	5:37
16.	"Feel Fine!" (from album Fairy Tale)	Akihito Tokunaga	Akihito Tokunaga	4:49

== Charts and certifications ==
Chart (2009)	Peak position
Japan Billboard Top Albums	1
Japan Oricon Daily album Chart	1
Japan Oricon Weekly album Chart	1
Japan Oricon Yearly album Chart	25
Taiwan Combo Chart	5
Taiwan International Chart	1
Taiwan J-Pop Chart	1

=== Sales and certifications ===
Country	Provider	Sales	Certification
Japan	RIAJ	257,127	Platinum

== Release history ==
Country	Date	Label	Format	Catalog
Japan	September 9, 2009	Northern Music	LP album	VNJM-9001
Japan	September 9, 2009	Northern Music	Cassette tape	VNTM-9001
Japan	September 9, 2009	Northern Music	MiniDisc	VNYM-9001
Japan	September 9, 2009	Northern Music	USB flash drive	VNZM-9001
Japan	September 9, 2009	Northern Music	microSD	VNZM-9002
Japan	September 9, 2009	Northern Music	2CD+DVD (Limited edition)	VNCM-9007
Japan	September 9, 2009	Northern Music	2CD (Standard edition)	VNCM-9009
Japan	September 9, 2009	Northern Music	2CD (FC & Musing edition)	
Taiwan	September 9, 2009	SK-Being	CD	SBCA-9002
Japan	December 8, 2009	Northern Music	CD	VNCL-9009
