= Cool City Production Vol. 3 "Mai-K's Club Side" =

Remix album by Mai Kuraki and Cool City Production
- Released: April 24, 2002
- Recorded: 2000–2002
- Genres: J-pop; electronic; hip hop
- Label: Tent House
- Producers: Michiaki Satate; Schweitzer; Miguel Graca; Jaffa; Tapani Tolpanniemi; M-oZ; Kut N'paste; Hash; Cay Taylan; Fellowship; D. Hickey; WSFF 2102

Mai Kuraki albums chronology
Secret of My Heart (2002)	Cool City Production Vol. 3 "Mai-K's Club Side" (2002)	Fairy Tale (2002)

Cool City Production albums chronology
Cool City Production Vol. 2 "Mai-K's Re-Mix" (2001)	Cool City Production Vol. 3 "Mai-K's Club Side" (2002)	Cool City Production Vol. 4 "Mai-K" Feel Fine! (2002)

Cool City Production Vol. 3 "Mai-K's Club Side" is a remix album by Japanese singer and songwriter Mai Kuraki and Japanese production team Cool City Production. It was released on April 24, 2002, by Tent House. The album contains remixes of tracks from her first three studio albums: Delicious Way (2000), Perfect Crime (2001) and Fairy Tale (2002) and her first English-language album Secret of My Heart.

== Track listing ==
No.	Title	Writer(s)	Remixer(s)	Length
1.	"Stay by My Side" (Schweitzer Mix)	Mai Kuraki; Aika Ohno; Cybersound	Schweitzer	6:06
2.	"Come On! Come On!" (Miguel Graca Mix)	Kuraki; Perry Geye; Miguel Sá Pessoa; Michael Africk; Cybersound	Miguel Graca	7:07
3.	"Frozen Sea" (Jaffa Remix)	Kuraki; Ohno; Cybersound	Jaffa	4;06
4.	"Did I Hear You Say That You're In Love" (Tapani Remix)	Jeffrey Qwest; Tomoo Kasahara	Tapani Tolpanniemi	5:59
5.	"Delicious Way" (M-oZ Mix)	Kuraki; Ohno; Cybersound	M-oZ	4:45
6.	"Can't Get Enough (Gimme Your Love)" (Kut N'paste Dubfilter Remix)	Kuraki; YOKO Black. Stone	Kut N'paste	5:17
7.	"Happy Days" (Recue Mix)	Kuraki; Ohno; Cybersound	Hash	5:38
8.	"Brand New Day" (Cay Taylan Mix)	Kuraki; Ohno; Akihito Tokunaga	Cay Taylan	5:46
9.	"Winter Bells" (Fellowship Secret Remix)	Kuraki; Tokunaga	Fellowship; D.Hickey	6:51
10.	"Start in My Life" (WSFF 2102 Remix)	Kuraki; Ohno; Cybersound	WSFF 2102	4:24

== Release history ==
Country	Date	Label	Ref.
Japan	April 24, 2002	Tent House	
