= 20th Anniversary Mai Kuraki Live Project 2019 "Let's Goal!: Barairo no Jinsei" =

Video by Mai Kuraki
- Released: June 24, 2020
- Recorded: Tokyo International Forum, Hall A (Tokyo, Japan)
- Genres: Pop; R&B
- Length: 3:08:00
- Label: Northern Music

Mai Kuraki chronology
| Mai Kuraki Live Project 2018 "Red It be: Kimi Omou Shunkashūtō" (2019) | 20th Anniversary Mai Kuraki Live Project 2019 "Let's Goal!: Barairo no Jinsei" (2020) |

20th Anniversary Mai Kuraki Live Project 2019 "Let's Goal!: Barairo no Jinsei" (20th Anniversary Mai Kuraki Live Project 2019 "Let's GOAL! ~薔薇色の人生~") is the twenty-third video album by Japanese singer-songwriter Mai Kuraki. It was released through Northern Music on June 24, 2020. The video album was originally set for release on April 29, 2020 but was delayed due to the COVID-19 pandemic. The release features Kuraki's performance during her 20th Anniversary Mai Kuraki Live Project 2019 "Let's Goal!: Barairo no Jinsei" Tour in Tokyo on October 26, 2019.

== Track listing ==
| No. | Title | Length |
|---|---|---|
| 1. | "Love, Day After Tomorrow" |
| 2. | "Stay by My Side" |
| 3. | "Secret of My Heart" |
| 4. | "Delicious Way" |
| 5. | "Long Distance" |
| 6. | "Your Best Friend" |
| 7. | "Missing You" |
| 8. | "Tsumetai Umi" |
| 9. | "Tonight, I Feel Close to You" (featuring Aika Ohno) |
| 10. | "Anata ga Irukara" |
| 11. | "Happy Days" |
| 12. | "Be Proud: We Make New History" |
| 13. | "Time After Time (Hana Mau Machi de)" |
| 14. | "Togetsukyo (Kimi Omou)" |
| 15. | "Kimi to Koi no Mama de Owarenai Itsumo Yume no Mama ja Irarenai" |
| 16. | "Let's Go!" |
| 17. | "Change" |
| 18. | "Sawage Life" |
| 19. | "Stand Up" |
| 20. | "Best of Hero" |
| 21. | "Feel Fine!" |
| 22. | "Barairo no Jinsei" |
| 23. | "Jump! Jump!" |
| 24. | "Shiawase no Tobira" |
| 25. | "Chance for You" |
| 26. | "Makenaide" (Zard cover) |
| 27. | "Always" |

== Charts ==
| Chart (2020) | Peak position |
|---|---|
| Japan Weekly DVD Chart (Oricon) | 12 |
| Japan Weekly Blu-ray Chart (Oricon) | 17 |
| Japan Weekly Music DVD Chart (Oricon) | 6 |
| Japan Weekly Music Blu-ray Chart (Oricon) | 4 |

== Release history ==
| Region | Date | Format | Catalogue no. | Label |
|---|---|---|---|---|
| Japan | June 24, 2020 | DVD | VNBM-7035/7036 | Northern Music |
| Japan | June 24, 2020 | Blu-ray | VNXM-7035 | Northern Music |
