= Let's Goal!: Barairo no Jinsei =

- Standard edition cover

Studio album by Mai Kuraki
- Released: August 14, 2019
- Recorded: 2018–2019
- Studio: Northern Music
- Genre: J-pop; R&B
- Label: Northern Music
- Producer: Mai Kuraki; Daiko Nagato; Benbrick

Mai Kuraki chronology
Kimi Omou: Shunkashūtō (2018)	Let's Goal!: Barairo no Jinsei (2019)	Mai Kuraki Single Collection: Chance for You (2019)

Singles from Let's Goal!: Barairo no Jinsei
- 1. "Kimi to Koi no Mama de Owarenai Itsumo Yume no Mama ja Irarenai" Released: March 20, 2019; 2. "Barairo no Jinsei" Released: March 20, 2019

Let's Goal!: Barairo no Jinsei is the twelfth studio album by Japanese singer and songwriter Mai Kuraki. The album was released on August 14, 2019, by Northern Music. It is the follow-up to her 2018 album Kimi Omou: Shunkashūtō. The album was released on standard edition, fan club edition, and five limited editions, each of which includes a lyric book of different designs. Let's Goal!: Barairo no Jinsei is a J-pop album, incorporating elements of R&B, rock, electropop and many other genres.

The album was supported by the double A-side single, "Kimi to Koi no Mama de Owarenai Itsumo Yume no Mama ja Irarenai" and "Barairo no Jinsei", which peaked at number four in Japan, becoming her forty-second consecutive top 10 single. To promote the album, the singer embarked on the national tour, "20th Anniversary Mai Kuraki Live Project 2019 "Let's Goal!: Barairo no Jinsei"" from August 17, 2019. Upon release, Let's Goal!: Barairo no Jinsei debuted at number three on the Oricon Weekly Albums chart with 19,998 copies, becoming Kuraki's fifteenth top 10 album in Japan.

== Release ==
On 15 April 2019, Kuraki announced the release of the new album, Let's Goal!: Barairo no Jinsei in the summer of the year. The release date of the album was revealed on 26 May 2019, at the meet and greet tour held at Venus Fort in Tokyo. On 31 July 2019, the snippets of each track on the album was uploaded on Kuraki's official website.

Let's Goal!: Barairo no Jinsei was released in seven versions, standard edition, FC & Musing edition, and five limited editions, each of which represents the five rings of the Olympic symbols and the five corresponding continents: Europe, Asia, Africa, America, and Oceania. While the standard edition includes the bonus track, the limited editions was accompanied by the bonus disc which includes the cover of Zard's song, "Makenaide". Each limited edition was accompanied with the different design of lyric booklets.

== Promotion ==
=== Singles ===
A double-A side single, "Kimi to Koi no Mama de Owarenai Itsumo Yume no Mama ja Irarenai"/"Barairo no Jinsei" was released as the lead single from the album on 20 March 2019. Both songs served as the theme song to the Japanese animated television series, Case Closed. The single was a commercial success, peaking at number four in Japan and selling over 37,000 copies nationwide.

==== Other songs ====
"Shiawase no Tobira" was used on the television commercial for Cleverlyhome, in which Kuraki was starred.

"Makenaide" is a cover of a Zard song, and was included exclusively on limited editions of Let's Goal!: Barairo no Jinsei. To promote the album, Kuraki performed the song on television shows including Music Station and Best Artist 2019.

=== Tours ===
==== Meet and greet tour ====
In support of the album, Kuraki embarked on the meet and greet tour entitled 20 Shūnen Arigato! Medal Juyoshiki, which began on 25 May 2019 in Abeno-ku, Osaka.

===== Set list =====
This set list is from the show in Osaka on May 25, 2019. It may not represent all concerts for the duration of the tour.

1. "Kimi to Koi no Mama de Owarenai Itsumo Yume no Mama ja Irarenai"
2. "Shiawase no Tobira"
3. "Barairo no Jinsei"

Date	City	Country	Venue
25 May 2019	Abeno-ku, Osaka	Japan	Abeno Cues Mall
26 May 2019	Tokyo	Japan	Venus Fort
15 June 2019	Nagoya, Aichi	Japan	Asunal Kanayama
16 June 2019	Chiba	Japan	LaLaPort Tokyo Bay
17 August 2019	Zama, Kanagawa	Japan	Harmony Zama

==== 20th Anniversary Mai Kuraki Live Project 2019 "Let's Goal!: Barairo no Jinsei" ====
20th Anniversary Mai Kuraki Live Project 2019 "Let's Goal!: Barairo no Jinsei"
- National tour by Mai Kuraki
- Location: Japan
- Associated album: Let's Goal!: Barairo no Jinsei
- Start date: August 17, 2019
- End date: November 11, 2019
- Legs: 1
- No. of shows: 15
- Supporting acts: All at Once; Aika Ohno

Mai Kuraki concert chronology
- Mai Kuraki Live Project 2018 "Red It Be": Kimi Omou Shunkashūtō (2018); 20th Anniversary Mai Kuraki Live Project 2019 "Let's Goal!: Barairo no Jinsei" (2019)

The concert tour, entitled 20th Anniversary Mai Kuraki Live Project 2019 "Let's Goal!: Barairo no Jinsei" began on August 17, 2019 in support of the album. The show in Tokyo was recorded and released on a video album, 20th Anniversary Mai Kuraki Live Project 2019 "Let's Goal!: Barairo no Jinsei".

===== Set list =====
This set list is from the show in Tokyo on October 26, 2019. It may not represent all concerts for the duration of the tour.

1. "Love, Day After Tomorrow"
2. "Stay by My Side"
3. "Secret of My Heart"
4. "Delicious Way"
5. "Long Distance"
6. "Your Best Friend"
7. "Missing You"
8. "Tsumetai Umi"
9. "Tonight, I Feel Close to You" (featuring Aika Ohno)
10. "Anata ga Irukara"
11. "Happy Days"
12. "Be Proud: We Make New History"
13. "Time After Time (Hana Mau Machi de)"
14. "Togetsukyo (Kimi Omou)"
15. "Kimi to Koi no Mama de Owarenai Itsumo Yume no Mama ja Irarenai"
16. "Let's Go!"
17. "Change"
18. "Sawage Life"
19. "Stand Up"
20. "Best of Hero"
21. "Feel Fine!"
22. "Barairo no Jinsei"

Encore

1. "Jump! Jump!"
2. "Shiawase no Tobira"
3. "Chance for You"
4. "Makenaide" (Zard cover)
5. "Always"

===== Tour dates =====
Date	City	Country	Venue	Opening act
17 August 2019	Zama, Kanagawa	Japan	Harmony Zama	—
24 August 2019	Kobe, Hyogo	Japan	Kobe International House	—
25 August 2019	Kyoto, Kyoto	Japan	ROHM Theatre Kyoto	—
31 August 2019	Hanyu, Saitama	Japan	Hanyu City Industrial and Cultural Hall	—
7 September 2019	Okayama, Okayama	Japan	Okayama Civic Hall	—
8 September 2019	Mihara, Hiroshima	Japan	Mihara Performing Arts Center Popolo	—
14 September 2019	Yasugi, Shimane	Japan	Yasugi General Culture Hall Artepia	—
16 September 2019	Takamatsu, Kagawa	Japan	Sun Port Hall Takamatsu	—
28 September 2019	Kumamoto, Kumamoto	Japan	Kumamoto Prefectural Theater	—
29 September 2019	Miyakonojō, Miyazaki	Japan	Miyakonojō Art & Culture Hall	—
6 October 2019	Sapporo, Hokkaido	Japan	Sapporo Education and Culture Hall	—
20 October 2019	Nagoya, Aichi	Japan	Aichi Arts Center	All at Once
22 October 2019	Osaka, Osaka	Japan	Grand Cube Osaka	All at Once
26 October 2019	Tokyo	Japan	Tokyo International Forum	All at Once
11 November 2019	Sendai, Miyagi	Japan	TOHKnet Hall Sendai	—

====== Cancelled show ======
Date	City	Country	Venue	Reason
12 October 2019	Sendai, Miyagi	Japan	TOHKnet Hall Sendai	Schedule changes due to the Typhoon Hagibis

== Commercial performance ==
On August 13, Let's Goal!: Barairo no Jinsei debuted at number three on the Oricon Daily Albums Chart with 8,949 copies sold. It also debuted at number three on the Oricon Weekly Albums Chart, with 19,998 copies sold in its first week. The album has sold 29,451 copies and stayed on the chart for eleven weeks. The album was a commercial failure, becoming Kuraki's lowest-selling studio album.

== Track listing ==
No.	Title	Writer(s)	Length
1.	"Let's Go!"	Mai Kuraki; Kenichi Ide; Holly Moma; Yukiko Kaneda	3:17
2.	"Kimi to Koi no Mama de Owarenai Itsumo Yume no Mama ja Irarenai" (きみと恋のままで終われない いつも夢のままじゃいられない)	Kuraki; Daisuke Nakamura	4:35
3.	"Long Distance"	Kuraki; Nakamura	3:28
4.	"Missing You"	Kuraki; H-Wonder	4:32
5.	"Wishing on a.."	Kuraki; Jeff Franzel; Paul Carter; Kanata Okajima	4:18
6.	"I Will"	Kuraki; Akihito Tokunaga	4:16
7.	"Can't Stop My Feeling"	Kuraki; Tamra Keenan; Josef Larossi; Andreas Romdhane	3:24
8.	"Body Talkin'"	Kuraki; Jake Torrey; Fernando Garibay; OMEGA; Benjamin Ingrosso; Ramiro Padilla; Nick Long	3:11
9.	"Change"	Kuraki; Keenan; Andrew Burford	3:32
10.	"Jump! Jump!"	Kuraki; h-wonder	4:13
11.	"Barairo no Jinsei" (薔薇色の人生)	Kuraki; Tokunaga	3:45
12.	"Shiawase no Tobira" (幸せの扉)	Kuraki; Nakamura	3:18

Standard edition bonus track
No.	Title	Writer(s)	Length
13.	"Kimi to Koi no Mama de Owarenai Itsumo Yume no Mama ja Irarenai" (Cyber Mix)	Kuraki; Nakamura; Cybersound	4:35

Limited edition bonus disc
No.	Title	Writer(s)	Length
1.	"Makenaide" (Zard cover)	Izumi Sakai; Tetsuro Oda; Hiroshi Asai	4:13
Total length:			4:13

== Personnel ==
- Kenichi Ide - producer, composer
- Daisuke Nakamura - producer, composer
- H-Wonder - producer, composer
- Benbrick - producer
- Akihito Tokunaga - producer, composer
- Josef Larossi - producer, composer
- Andreas Romdhane - producer, composer
- Omega - producer, composer
- Fernando Garibay - producer, composer
- One Above - producer
- Hiroshi Asai - producer
- Mai Kuraki - executive producer, vocals, composer
- Daiko Nakato - executive producer
- Maana - backing vocals
- Shinichiro Ohta - backing vocals
- Kanna Inoue - backing vocals
- All at Once - backing vocals
- Yoshinobu Ohga - guitars
- Tokiko T Nishimuro - chief director
- Shun Sato - director
- Takayuki Ichikawa - recording engineer, mixing
- Masahiro Shimada - mastering
- Tetsuo Sato - art director, designer
- Hidemi Arai - art director, designer
- Sunao Ohmori - photographer
- Hitoko Gotoh - stylist
- Keizo Kuroda - hair and makeup artist
- Kaoru Chujo - visual contents
- Hideyuki Kouno - print coordinator
- Asumi Narita - creative coordinator
- Miho Saito - artist and relation
- Asako Watanabe - artist management
- Manami Yoshita - artist management
- Being, Inc. - media promotion, distribution
- Toshinori Masuda - supervisor
- Holly Mama - composer
- Yukiko Kaneda - composer
- Jeff Franzel - composer
- Paul Carter - composer
- Kanata Okajima - composer
- Tamra Keenan - composer
- Jake Torrey - composer
- Benjamin Ingrosso - composer
- Ramiro Padilla - composer
- Nick Long - composer
- Andrew Burford - composer

== Charts ==
=== Daily charts ===
Chart (2019)	Peak position
Japanese Albums (Oricon)	2

=== Weekly charts ===
Chart (2019)	Peak position
Japanese Albums (Oricon)	3
Japanese Hot Albums (Billboard Japan)	5

=== Monthly charts ===
Chart (2019)	Peak position
Japanese Albums (Oricon)	15

== Release history ==
Region	Date	Format	Catalogue no.	Label	Ref.
Japan	August 14, 2019	CD (Standard edition)	VNCM-9050	Northern Music	
Japan	August 14, 2019	2CD (Limited edition: Blue)	VNCM-9045	Northern Music	
Japan	August 14, 2019	2CD (Limited edition: Yellow)	VNCM-9046	Northern Music	
Japan	August 14, 2019	2CD (Limited edition: Black)	VNCM-9047	Northern Music	
Japan	August 14, 2019	2CD (Limited edition: Green)	VNCM-9048	Northern Music	
Japan	August 14, 2019	2CD (Limited edition: Red)	VNCM-9049	Northern Music	
Japan	August 14, 2019	CD (Musing & FC edition)	VNCF-9011	Northern Music	
Japan	August 14, 2019	Digital download		Being Inc.	
