= First Cut (album) =

- DVD cover

Video by Mai Kuraki
- Released: November 8, 2000
- Genre: J-Pop
- Length: 40 minutes
- Label: B-Vision
- Producer: Kanonji

Mai Kuraki chronology
First Cut (2000)	Mai Kuraki & Experience First Live 2001 in Zepp Osaka (2001)

First Cut is the first video album by Japanese recording artist Mai Kuraki. It was released on DVD and VHS on November 8, 2000 by B-Vision, simultaneously with her single "Reach for the Sky". The video brought a collection of Kuraki's music videos and making videos. The album became the second best-selling video album (DVD) of 2000 in Japan.

== Commercial performance ==
The album sold over 99,000 copies in its first week and debuted at number one on the Oricon weekly video albums chart. It became the highest first-week video album sales by female singers in Japan until Namie Amuro update the record with Namie Amuro Best Fiction Tour 2008–2009 in 2009. First Cut has sold over 232,000 copies so far.

== Track listing ==
No.	Title	Length
1.	"Opening"
2.	"Love, Day After Tomorrow" (Music video)
3.	"Stay by My Side" (Music video)
4.	"Secret of My Heart" (Music video)
5.	"Secret of My Heart" (Making)
6.	"Never Gonna Give You Up" (Music video)
7.	"Delicious Way" (Selected songs)
8.	"Simply Wonderful" (Music video)
9.	"Stay by My Side" (Dream on version / Music video)
10.	"Baby I Like" (Music video)
11.	"Discography"
