= Mai Kuraki Live Project 2018 "Red It be: Kimi Omou Shunkashūtō" =

Video by Mai Kuraki
- Released: November 27, 2019
- Recorded: Narita International Cultural Center（Chiba, Japan） Grand Cube Osaka（Osaka, Japan） Tokyo International Forum（Tokyo, Japan） NTK Hall（Nagoya, Japan）
- Genre: Pop; J-pop; R&B
- Label: Northern Music

Mai Kuraki chronology
Mai Kuraki Live Project 2017: Sawage Live (2017)	Mai Kuraki Live Project 2018 "Red It be: Kimi Omou Shunkashūtō" (2019)	20th Anniversary Mai Kuraki Live Project 2019 "Let's Goal!: Barairo no Jinsei" (2020)

Mai Kuraki Live Project 2018 "Red It be: Kimi Omou Shunkashūtō" is the twenty-second video album by Japanese singer-songwriter Mai Kuraki. It is set to be released on November 27, 2019, as a DVD and Blu-ray video release. The release features performances filmed during her concert tour, Mai Kuraki Live Project 2018 "Red It Be": Kimi Omou Shunkashūtō, and is accompanied 40-page booklet.

== Background ==
On October 17, 2019, Kuraki announced the release of the album on her website.

== Track listing ==
No.	Title	Length
1.	"Togetsukyo (Kimi Omou)"
2.	"Koyoi wa Yume wo Misasete"
3.	"Yume ga Saku Haru"
4.	"P.S My Sunshine"
5.	"Reach for the Sky"
6.	"Togetsukyo (Kimi Omou)"
7.	"Koyoi wa Yume wo Misasete"
8.	"Diamond Wave"
9.	"Feel Fine!"
10.	"Delicious Way"
11.	"HAPPY BIRTHDAY Mai-K"
12.	"Togetsukyo (Kimi Omou)"
13.	"Koyoi wa Yume wo Misasete"
14.	"Summer Time Gone"
15.	"Your Best Friend"
16.	"Tomorrow is the Last Time"
17.	"Secret of My Heart"
18.	"Mi Corazón"
19.	"Light Up My Life"
20.	"Let It Be" (The Beatles cover)
21.	"Be Proud: We Make New History"
22.	"Makka na Kasa: Kyoto no Ame"
23.	"Time After Time (Hana Mau Machi de)"
24.	"Hanakotoba"
25.	"We Are Happy Women"
26.	"Be With U"
27.	"Stand Up"
28.	"Sawage Life"
29.	"Wake Me Up"
30.	"Do It!"
31.	"Muteki na Heart"
32.	"Love, Day After Tomorrow"
33.	"Always"
34.	"Togetsukyo (Kimi Omou)"
35.	"Koyoi wa Yume wo Misasete"
36.	"Tsumetai Umi"
37.	"Shiroi Yuki"
38.	"24 Xmas Time"
39.	"Always"

== Release history ==
Region	Date	Format	Label	Ref.
Japan	November 27, 2019	3DVD	Northern Music	
Japan	November 27, 2019	2Blu-ray	Northern Music	
