= Secret of My Heart (Mai Kuraki album) =

Studio album by Mai-K
- Released: January 10, 2002 (US); January 11, 2002 (JPN)
- Genre: Pop; Contemporary R&B; Electronica
- Length: 51:53
- Label: Tent House; Giza USA
- Producer: Giza USA

Mai Kuraki singles chronology
Perfect Crime (2001)	Secret of My Heart (2002)	Fairy Tale (2002)

Singles from Secret of My Heart
- 1. "Baby I Like" Released: October 16, 1999; 2. "Love, Day After Tomorrow" Released: December 8, 1999; 3. "Stay by My Side" Released: March 15, 2000; 4. "Secret of My Heart" Released: April 26, 2000; 5. "Never Gonna Give You Up" Released: June 7, 2000

Secret of My Heart is the first English-language studio album by Japanese recording artist Mai Kuraki, under the name Mai-K. It was released on January 10, 2002 under Giza USA. Secret of My Heart consists of two songs from the lead single "Baby I Like" and English versions of 8 songs from her debut album Delicious Way, which sold over 3.5 million copies in Japan. However, her fourth Japanese single "Never Gonna Give You Up" is included as the original version.

== Release and promotion ==
=== Singles ===
"Baby I Like" was released as the lead single from the album on October 16, 1999 by East West Records and Bip! Records in the United States. It's a cover song of Yoko Black. Stone's 1997 song from her first extended play 's All Right and samples 90's R&B influences and themed about sexual intercourse. The theme aroused much controversy, some claiming it's inappropriate for a 17-year-old girl to sing. However, the single failed commercially in the US market and the label sent her back to Japan. Also, the second track of the album, "Did I Hear You Say That You're In Love" was included on the single as B-side track.

Also, Secret of My Heart includes English version of the following singles:

"Love, Day After Tomorrow" was released as the lead single from Kuraki's debut album Delicious Way on December 8, 1999 by Giza Studio. The song steadily climbed on the Oricon chart and peaked at number two, making it the fourth best-selling single of 2000 in Japan. It has sold over 1.4 million copies in Japan and been certificated million by RIAJ. The song is her best-selling single of all-time. It was written by Kuraki herself, Aika Ohno and Cybersound (Michael Africk, Perry Geyer, Miguel Sa Pessoa).

"Stay by My Side" was released as the second single from Delicious Way on March 15, 2000 by Giza Studio. The song topped on the Oricon chart and became the seventeenth best-selling single of 2000 in Japan. It has sold over 922,140 copies in Japan and been certificated million by RIAJ. The song was written by Kuraki herself, Aika Ohno and Cybersound (Michael Africk, Perry Geyer, Miguel Sa Pessoa).

"Secret of My Heart" was released as the third single from Delicious Way on April 26, 2000 by Giza Studio. The song was served as the ninth ending theme song to the Japanese anime Case Closed. The song peaked at number two on the Oricon chart and became the sixteenth best-selling single of 2000 in Japan. It has sold over 968,980 copies and been certificated million by RIAJ. The song was written by Kuraki herself, Aika Ohno and Cybersound (Michael Africk, Perry Geyer, Miguel Sa Pessoa).

"Never Gonna Give You Up" was released as the fourth single from Delicious Way on June 7, 2000 by Giza Studio. The song peaked at number two on the Oricon chart and became fifty-ninth best-selling single of 2000 in Japan. It has sold over 434,250 copies and been certificated 2×platinum by RIAJ. The song was written by Kuraki herself, Michael Africk, Miguel Sá Pessoa and Perry Geyer.

== Track listing ==
No.	Title	Lyrics	Music	Arranger(s)	Length
1.	"Secret of My Heart"	Mai Kuraki	Aika Ohno	ZOD	4:36
2.	"Did I Hear You Say That You're In Love"	Jeffrey Qwest	Tomoo Kasahawa	Qwest	4:09
3.	"Never Gonna Give You Up"	Kuraki; Michael Africk	Michael Africk; Miguel Sá Pessoa; Perry Geyer	Cybersound Michael Africk, Perry Geyer, Miguel Sa Pessoa	4:05
4.	"Baby I Like"	Yoko Black. Stone	Yoko	Cybersound Michael Africk, Perry Geyer, Miguel Sa Pessoa	4:25
5.	"Stay by My Side"	Kuraki	Ohno	ZOD	4:30
6.	"Can't Get Enough (Gimme Your Love)"	Yoko	Yoko	Cybersound Michael Africk, Perry Geyer, Miguel Sa Pessoa	3:45
7.	"Delicious Way"	Kuraki	Ohno	ZOD	3:59
8.	"Love, Day After Tomorrow"	Kuraki	Ohno	ZOD	4:18
9.	"Stepping ∞ Out"	Kuraki	Yoko	Yoko	4:42
10.	"Baby Tonight (You and Me)"	Kuraki; Africk	Yoko; Kasahara	Yoko	4:04
11.	"Baby I Like" (Extacy Vocal Mix)	Yoko	Yoko	Justin Strauss	4:57
12.	"'s All Right" (DJ Me-Ya Radical Beat Mix)	Yoko	Yoko	DJ Me-Ya	4:54
Total length:					56:43

== Release history ==
Region	Date	Format	Label
United States	January 10, 2002	CD	Tent House; Giza USA
Japan	January 11, 2002	CD	Tent House; Giza USA
