= Wish You the Best (album) =

Compilation album by Mai Kuraki
- Released: January 1, 2004
- Recorded: 1999–2003
- Genre: Pop, R&B
- Length: 70:38
- Label: Giza Studio
- Producer: Kanonji

Mai Kuraki chronology
If I Believe (2003)	Wish You the Best (2004)	Fuse of Love (2005)

Wish You the Best is the first compilation album by Japanese recording artist Mai Kuraki. It was released on January 1, 2004. The compilation won Pop Album of the Year at the 19th Japan Gold Disc Awards.

== Commercial performance ==
Wish You the Best debuted at number-one with 450,127 copies sold making it Kuraki's fifth number-one debut. The album spent three weeks atop of the Oricon albums chart. It charted for a total of 46 weeks of which the album consecutively spent 7 in the top 10. Wish You the Best was the 3rd best selling compilation album of 2004 and 7th best selling album overall.

Wish You the Best is Kuraki's third and last album to be certified Million.

== Track listing ==
All lyrics are written by Mai Kuraki except track 4 which was co-written with Michael Africk.

Wish You the Best – Standard edition
No.	Title	Music	Arranger(s)	Length
1.	"Love, Day After Tomorrow"	Aika Ohno	Cybersound (Michael Africk, Perry Geyer, Miguel Sa Pessoa)	4:04
2.	"Stay by My Side"	Ohno	Cybersound (Michael Africk, Perry Geyer, Miguel Sa Pessoa)	4:27
3.	"Secret of My Heart"	Ohno	Cybersound (Michael Africk, Perry Geyer, Miguel Sa Pessoa)	4:27
4.	"Never Gonna Give You Up"	Michael Africk, Perry Geyer, Miguel Sa Pessoa	Michael Africk, Perry Geyer, Miguel Sa Pessoa	4:01
5.	"Delicious Way"	Ohno	Cybersound (Michael Africk, Perry Geyer, Miguel Sa Pessoa)	3:53
6.	"Simply Wonderful (Radio Edit)"	Ohno	Cybersound (Michael Africk, Perry Geyer, Miguel Sa Pessoa)	3:54
7.	"Reach for the Sky"	Ohno	Cybersound (Michael Africk, Perry Geyer, Miguel Sa Pessoa)	4:49
8.	"Tsumetai Umi"	Ohno	Cybersound (Michael Africk, Perry Geyer, Miguel Sa Pessoa)	4:42
9.	"Stand Up"	Akihito Tokunaga	Tokunaga	4:38
10.	"Always"	Ohno	Cybersound (Michael Africk, Perry Geyer, Miguel Sa Pessoa)	4:08
11.	"Winter Bells"	Tokunaga	Tokunaga	4:38
12.	"Feel Fine!"	Tokunaga	Tokunaga	4:50
13.	"Like a Star in the Night"	Tokunaga	Tokunaga, Strings arrangement: Daisuke Ikeda	5:36
14.	"Time After Time (Hana Mau Machi de)"	Ohno	Cybersound (Michael Africk, Perry Geyer, Miguel Sa Pessoa)	5:36
15.	"Kaze no La La La"	Michiya Haruhata	Cybersound (Michael Africk, Perry Geyer, Miguel Sa Pessoa)	4:23
16.	"Tonight, I Feel Close to You" (Duet with Stefanie Sun)	Ohno	Cybersound (Michael Africk, Perry Geyer, Miguel Sa Pessoa)	4:06
Total length:				70:38

Wish You the Best – Korean edition bonus mini CD
No.	Title	Lyrics	Music	Arranger(s)	Length
1.	"Chance for You"	Mai Kuraki	Aika Ohno	Hiroshi Asai	3:31
Total length:					3:31

== Charts ==
Chart (2004)	Peak position
Japan Oricon Daily Albums Chart	1
Japan Oricon Weekly Albums Chart	1
Japan Oricon Monthly Albums Chart	1
Japan Oricon Yearly Albums Chart	7

== Certifications ==
Country	Provider	Sales	Certification (sales thresholds)
Japan	RIAJ	956,162	Million
