= Wish You the Best =

Wish You the Best may refer to:

- Wish You the Best (album), a 2004 compilation album by Mai Kuraki
- "Wish You the Best" (song), a 2023 song by Lewis Capaldi
