= Perfect Crime (album) =

Studio album by Mai Kuraki
- Released: July 4, 2001
- Recorded: 2000–2001
- Genre: Pop, R&B
- Length: 56:37
- Label: Giza Studio
- Producer: Kanonji

Mai Kuraki chronology
Delicious Way (2000)	Perfect Crime (2001)	Fairy Tale (2002)

Singles from Perfect Crime
- 1. "Reach for the Sky" Released: November 8, 2000; 2. "Tsumetai Umi" Released: February 7, 2001; 3. "Start in My Life" Released: February 7, 2001; 4. "Stand Up" Released: April 18, 2001; 5. "Always" Released: June 6, 2001; 6. "Perfect Crime: Single Edit" Released: August 18, 2001

Perfect Crime is the second studio album by Japanese recording artist Mai Kuraki. It was released on July 4, 2001, by Giza Studio.

In Japan, the album debuted at number one on the Oricon chart, selling 800,210 copies in its first week and has been certified 4× Platinum by RIAJ after shipping over 1.6 million copies. As of February 2018, the album has sold over 1,319,970 copies in Japan.

The album's lead single, "Reach for the Sky" was released on November 8, 2000. The song debuted at number three on the Oricon chart, and went platinum for selling over 250,000 physical sales in Japan. The follow-up double A-side single, "Tsumetai Umi/Start in My Life" also performed successfully on the chart, peaking at number two. The third single from the album, "Stand Up" has sold over 476,000 physical copies and became her fourth best selling single. Also, the song became the thirty-second best selling song of 2001 in Japan. The fourth single from the album, "Always" was used as the twelfth ending theme to the anime series, Case Closed and the theme song to Countdown to Heaven, the fifth film in the series.

== Background ==
Kuraki stated that despite being completely absorbed in the production of her first album, Delicious Way, when compared to Perfect Crime, the latter felt like it had been created with so much diligence and character that listening to it was similar to watching a film.

== Singles ==
"Reach for the Sky" was released as the lead single from the album in November 2000. The song was written by Kuraki herself, Aika Ohno and Cybersound (Michael Africk, Perry Geyer, Miguel Pessoa) and served as the theme song to the 2000 Japanese TV program Audrey. The song debuted at number three and has sold over 468,320 copies in Japan. The song became her fifth best selling song of all time and has been certificated platinum by RIAJ. The rearranged version of the song was released in August 2013 as "Re:ggae Summer 2013 version".

The double A-side single "Tsumetai Umi/Start in My Life" was released as the second single in February 2001. "Tsumetai Umi" samples R&B influences and is themed about juvenile delinquency, while "Start in My Life" adopts 80's pop influences and themed about a farewell with her friends. Both songs were written by Kuraki herself, Aika Ohno and Cybersound (Michael Africk, Perry Geyer, Miguel Pessoa). The latter was used as the eleventh ending theme to the Case Closed anime. The single has sold over 356,310 copies and has been a certificated platinum by RIAJ.

"Stand Up" was released as the third single in April 2001. The song has become the biggest hit from the album to date and her fourth best selling song of all time. It has sold over 476,000 copies and been certificated platinum by RIAJ. Also, the song became the thirty-second best selling song of 2001 in Japan. The song samples 80's American rock music influence and was written by Kuraki herself and Akihito Tokunaga.

"Always" was released as the fourth single in June, 2001. The song was written by Kuraki herself, Aika Ohno and Cybersound (Michael Africk, Perry Geyer, Miguel Pessoa) and used as the twelfth ending theme to the Case Closed anime and the theme song to Countdown to Heaven, the fifth film in the series. The song has sold over 219,940 copies and been certificated platinum by RIAJ.

The title track of the album, "Perfect Crime" was released as "Perfect Crime: Single Edit" in August, 2001. It was released as a double-A side single with "Can't Forget Your Love" and peaked at number two on the Oricon Weekly Singles Chart. The track was served as the theme song to the 2001 Japanese TV program Ikiru tame no Jonetsu toshite no Satsujin. "Can't Forget Your Love" became the lead single of Kuraki's third studio album, Fairy Tale.

The ninth track of the album, "Think About" was a B-side track of her fifth single "Simply Wonderful". However, the title track of the single hadn't been included on any albums until the release of her first compilation album, Wish You the Best in January, 2004. The single has sold over 384,820 copies in Japan and has been certificated platinum by RIAJ.

The thirteenth track of the album, "The Rose ~Melody in the Sky~" was recorded on the limited edition of her 2009 double A-side single, "Puzzle/Revive" as "The Rose: Melody In the Sky (Acoustic Live Ver.)".

== Commercial performance ==
Perfect Crime debuted at number-one with 800,210 copies sold, making it Kuraki's second number-one debut. The album stayed on the Oricon albums chart for a total of 17 weeks, of which the album spent 6 in the top 10, non-consecutively. Perfect Crime was the 12th best selling album of 2001.

== Track listing ==
All lyrics are written by Mai Kuraki except tracks 6 (Kuraki/Michael Africk), track 8 (Kuraki/Keith Bazzle) and track 9 (Kuraki/Yoko Black. Stone)

CD/digital download
No.	Title	Music	Arranger(s)	Length
1.	"Perfect Crime"	Akihito Tokunaga	Tokunaga, Daisuke Ikeda	4:37
2.	"Start in My Life"	Aika Ohno	Cybersound (Michael Africk, Perry Geyer, Miguel Pessoa)	5:08
3.	"Reach for the Sky"	Ohno	Cybersound (Michael Africk, Perry Geyer, Miguel Pessoa)	4:48
4.	"Brand New Day"	Ohno	Tokunaga	3:47
5.	"Stand Up"	Tokunaga	Tokunaga	4:38
6.	"Come On! Come On!"	Perry Geyer, Miguel Sá Pessoa, Michael Africk	Cybersound (Michael Africk, Perry Geyer, Miguel Pessoa)	4:10
7.	"Always"	Ohno	Cybersound (Michael Africk, Perry Geyer, Miguel Pessoa)	4:09
8.	"What Are You Waiting For"	Tomoo Kasahara, Yoko Blaqstone	Stone	5:04
9.	"Think About"	Stone	Stone	4:44
10.	"Tsumetai Umi"	Ohno	Cybersound (Michael Africk, Perry Geyer, Miguel Pessoa)	4:42
11.	"Reach for the Sky (Gomi Remix: Radio Edit)"	Ohno	Cybersound, (Michael Africk, Perry Geyer, Miguel Pessoa) DJ Gomi	4:12
12.	"Itsuka wa Ano Sora ni" (いつかは あの空に "Someday in That Sky")	Ohno	Cybersound (Michael Africk, Perry Geyer, Miguel Pessoa)	4:32
13.	"The Rose ~Melody in the Sky~"	Ohno	Ohno	2:00
Total length:				56:37

== Charts ==
=== Daily charts ===
Chart (2001)	Peak position
Japanese Albums Chart	1

=== Weekly charts ===
Chart (2001)	Peak position
Oricon Albums Chart	1

=== Monthly charts ===
Chart (2001)	Peak position
Japanese Albums Chart	3

=== Yearly charts ===
Chart (2001)	Peak position
Japanese Albums Chart	12

== Certification and sales ==
Region	Certification	Certified units/sales
Japan (RIAJ)	4× Platinum	1,600,000^{^}
^{^} Shipments figures based on certification alone.

== Release history ==
Region	Date	Format	Label
Japan	July 4, 2001	CD	Giza Studio
Japan	2008	Digital download	Giza Studio
