= Reach for the Sky (Mai Kuraki song) =

2000 song by Mai Kuraki

- CD single cover

Single by Mai Kuraki

from the album Perfect Crime
- B-side: "What I Feel"
- Released: November 8, 2000
- Genre: J-pop
- Label: Giza Studio; Tent House; Northern Music
- Songwriters: Mai Kuraki; Aika Ohno; Cybersound; (Michael Africk, Perry Geyer, Miguel Pessoa)
- Producer: KANONJI

Mai Kuraki singles chronology
"Simply Wonderful" (2000)	"Reach for the Sky" (2000)	"Tsumetai Umi/Start in My Life" (2001)

Music video
- "Reach for the Sky" on YouTube

"Reach for the Sky" is a song by Japanese singer songwriter Mai Kuraki, taken from her second studio album Perfect Crime (2001). It was released on November 8, 2000, by Giza Studio, simultaneously with her first video album First Cut. The song was written by Kuraki herself and Aika Ohno, while the production was done by Cybersound (Michael Africk, Perry Geyer, Miguel Pessoa) and served as the theme song to the 2000 Japanese TV program Audrey. The rearranged version of the song "Re:ggae Summer 2013 version" was released digitally on August 17, 2013.

== Track listing ==
CD single
No.	Title	Writer(s)	Remixer	Length
1.	"Reach for the Sky"	Mai Kuraki; Aika Ohno; Cybersound; (Michael Africk, Perry Geyer, Miguel Pessoa)		4:48
2.	"What I Feel"	Kuraki; Jefery Qwest; Paisley; Michael Lee		3:55
3.	"Reach for the Sky" (Gomi Remix (Radio edit))	Kuraki; Ohno	DJ Gomi	4:09
4.	"Reach for the Sky" (Ken Ishii Remix)	Kuraki; Ohno	Ken Ishii	5:56
5.	"Reach for the Sky" (DJ Hiyoco Remix)	Kuraki; Ohno	DJ Hiyoco	6:43
6.	"Reach for the Sky" (Instrumental)	Kuraki; Ohno; Cybersound; (Michael Africk, Perry Geyer, Miguel Pessoa)		4:48
Total length:				30:39

Remixes (12-inch single)
No.	Title	Writer(s)	Remixer	Length
1.	"Reach for the Sky" (Lair Anthem Mix)	Mai Kuraki; Aika Ohno; Cybersound; (Michael Africk, Perry Geyer, Miguel Pessoa)	DJ Gomi
2.	"Reach for the Sky" (The Secret Vocal Mix Instrumental)	Kuraki; Ohno; Cybersound; (Michael Africk, Perry Geyer, Miguel Pessoa)	DJ Gomi

RE:GGAE Summer 2013 version (Digital download)
No.	Title	Writer(s)	Length
1.	"Reach for the Sky" (RE:GGAE Summer 2013 ver.)	Mai Kuraki; Aika Ohno	4:36
Total length:			4:36

== Credits and personnel ==
Credits adapted from CD single liner credits.

- Mai Kuraki – vocals, backing vocals, songwriting
- Aika Ohno – songwriting (1, 3, 4, 5)
- Cybersound (Michael Africk, Perry Geyer, Miguel Pessoa) – songwriting (1, 3, 4, 5, 6)
- Jeffery Quest - songwriting (2), backing vocals (2), rap (2)
- Paisley - songwriting (2)
- Michael Lee - songwriting (2), backing vocals (2)
- Hirohito Furui - additional songwriting (2)
- Michael Africk - backing vocals (1, 3, 4, 5, 6) sound producer (1), computer programming (1, 3, 4, 5, 6), synths (1, 3, 4, 5, 6)
- Ricky "Cosmo" Francis - backing vocals (2)
- Geoffrey Gems - backing vocals (2)
- Anna Gholston - backing vocals (2)
- Perry Geyer - sound producer (1), computer programming (1, 3, 4, 5, 6), synths (1, 3, 4, 5, 6)
- Greg Hawks - keyboards (1, 3, 4, 5, 6)
- Johnny Risk - guitars (1, 3, 4, 5, 6)
- Masakazu Tomita - system engineer (2)
- Gomi - remix (3), programming (3)
- David Acker - guitars (3)
- David Darlington - engineer (3)
- David Sussman - engineer (3)
- Ken Ishii 2000 - remix (4), additional production (4)
- DJ Hiyoco - remix (5)
- Kenn.nagai - programming (5), piano (5)
- Manabu Sakurai - engineer (5)
- KANONJI - executive producer
- Tokiko Nishimuro - director

== Charts ==
=== Weekly charts ===
Chart (2000)	Peak position
Japan (Oricon)	3

=== Monthly charts ===
Chart (2000)	Peak position
Japan (Oricon)	5

=== Year-end charts ===
Chart (2000)	Position
Japan (Oricon)	91
Chart (2001)	Position
Japan (Oricon)	114

== Certification and sales ==
Region	Certification	Certified units/sales
Japan (RIAJ)	Platinum	468,320

== Release history ==
Region	Date	Format	Label	Ref.
Japan	November 8, 2000	CD single	Giza Studio	
Japan	November 22, 2000	12-inch single (Remixes)	Tent House	
Japan	August 17, 2013	Digital download (Re:ggae Summer 2013 ver.)	Northern Music	
