= Baby I Like =

Single by Mai Kuraki

from the album Secret of My Heart
- B-side: "Did I Hear You Say That You're In Love"; "'s All Right"
- Released: October 16, 1999
- Recorded: 1999
- Studio: Cybersound Studio, Boston
- Genre: R&B
- Length: 4:22
- Label: East West Records; Bip! Records
- Songwriters: Mai Kuraki, Yoko Black. Stone, Jeffrey Qwest, Tomoo Kasahara
- Producers: Kanonji, Perry Geyer

Mai Kuraki singles chronology
"Baby I Like" (1999)	"Love, Day After Tomorrow" (1999)

"Baby I Like" is the debut American single by Japanese singer Mai-K. It was released on October 16, 1999, while Kurai was still a high school student, and distributed via East West Records and Bip! Records. Two of the tracks were written by Yoko Black. Stone, who had previously recorded all three songs. A collection of remixes of the A-side was released a few months later, on December 15. Commercially, the single didn't perform well in the US music market.

== Track listing ==
CD single
No.	Title	Music	Length
1.	"Baby I Like"	Yoko Black. Stone	4:22
2.	"Did I Hear You Say That You're In Love"	Jeffery Quest, Tomoo Kasahara	4:08
3.	"'s All Right"	Yoko Black. Stone	4:24
4.	"Baby I Like" (Oral Exciter House Remix)	Yoko Black. Stone	5:34

12" vinyl
No.	Title	Music	Length
1.	"Baby I Like" (Turn Me On Remix)	Mark Kamins/Joey Moskowitz
2.	"Baby I Like" (Extacy Vocal Mix)	Justin Strauss
3.	"Baby I Like" (Hyper Dub Mix)	Justin Strauss
4.	"Baby I Like" (Oral Exciter House Remix)	Perry Geyer
