= Simply Wonderful =

Single by Mai Kuraki

from the album Wish You the Best
- Released: September 27, 2000
- Genre: J-pop
- Label: Giza Studio
- Songwriters: Mai Kuraki; Aika Ohno; Yoko B. Stone; Cybersound
- Producer: Kanonji

Mai Kuraki singles chronology
"Never Gonna Give You Up" (2000)	"Simply Wonderful" (2000)	"Reach for the Sky" (2000)

"Simply Wonderful" is the 5th single by Japanese singer Mai Kuraki. It was written by Kuraki herself, Aika Ohno. This single was released on September 27, 2000.

== Track listing ==
All lyrics are written by Mai Kuraki except track 2 (co-written with Yoko Black Stone).

No.	Title	Music	Arranger(s)	Length
1.	"Simply Wonderful" (Club Edit)	Aika Ohno	Cybersound	4:24
2.	"Simply Wonderful" (Radio Edit)	Ohno	Cybersound	3:53
3.	"think about"	Yoko B. Stone	Stone	4:42
4.	"Baby I Like" (Turn Me On Mix)	Stone	Stone, Remixed by Mark Kamins and Joey Moskowitz	5:44
5.	"Simply Wonderful" (Club Edit / Instrumental)	Ohno	Cybersound	4:24
6.	"Simply Wonderful" (Radio Edit / Instrumental)	Ohno	Cybersound	3:53

== Personnel ==
- Mai Kuraki – vocals, backing vocals, lyrics
- Aika Ohno – composer, backing vocals
- Yoko Black Stone – composer, backing vocals, lyrics
- Michael Africk – backing vocals, keyboards
- Perry Geyer – computer programming
- Miguel Sá Pessoa – keyboards
- Mark Kamins – remix
- Joey Moskowitz – remix
- Tokiko Nishimuro – director
- KANONJI – executive producer

== Charts and certifications ==
=== Weekly charts ===
Chart (2000)	Peak position
Japan Oricon Singles Chart	2

=== Monthly charts ===
Chart (2000)	Peak position
Japan Oricon Singles Chart (October)	4

=== Yearly charts ===
Chart (2000)	Peak position
Japan Oricon Singles Chart	70

=== Certifications ===
Region	Certifications	Sales/Shipments
Japan (RIAJ)	Platinum	600,000
