= Michael Africk =

American singer-songwriter (born 1975)

- Born: August 20, 1975 (age 51); Boston, Massachusetts, US
- Genre: Pop; R&B; J-pop
- Occupations: Singer-songwriter, record producer
- Years active: 1999–present
- Labels: Hollywood; Giza Studios; Being Music; B Zone

Michael Africk (born 20 August 1975) is an American singer, songwriter, record producer and entrepreneur. After signing with Disney's Hollywood Records and releasing a solo album in 1999, he toured with N'Sync and Britney Spears. He collaborated with Mai Kuraki as a producer, songwriter and featured performer on the album Delicious Way which debuted at number one on the Oricon Albums Chart and had the highest first week sales for a debut album in Japanese music history with 2,218,640 units sold and remains the sixth best selling album of all time in Japan. He has collaborated on many chart topping singles and albums with Kuraki over the years, including the multi-platinum single Never Gonna Give You Up where he is also featured as a performer. Africk has six number one albums and ten top three singles to his credit as a writer and producer, and has received 6 Japan Gold Disc Awards for album and/or song of the year.

In 2011, Africk released his second studio album with Japanese record label Northern Music/Being Music. The album was co-produced by Africk and Louis Bell.

Since 2006, he has founded several entertainment and tech companies, including Handcraft Entertainment and Inmoji.

== Career ==
=== Musician ===
Africk sang "Someone Like Me", the theme song for Disney's animated film Doug's 1st Movie . The song was written by William Squier and Jeffrey Lodin, produced by Africk, Perry Geyer and Miguel Sa Pessoa, and featured the Boston Symphony Orchestra. In the same year, he released his 11-track self-titled album.

Africk was the opening act for N'Sync and Britney Spears, and toured in Japan. He composed the music for the Japanese anime series Secret of Cerulean Sand (2002). "What Can I Do", his song for the final credits, features Mai Kuraki.

Africk collaborated with Mai Kuraki for the song Baby Tonight, a single from the album Delicious Way. The album debuted at number one on the Oricon Albums Chart with 2,218,640 units sold, making it the highest first week sales for a debut album in Japanese music history and sixth overall. He collaborated with Kuraki on other songs as a writer and/or producer, including Never Gonna Give You Up, Secret of my heart, Love Day After Tomorrow, Stay By My Side, and others from the same album. Never Gonna Give You Up, which features Africk as a performer was certified double Platinum by the Recording Industry Association of Japan (RIAJ). He composed "Love One Another" with Kuraki for the benefit of the 2011 Tōhoku earthquake and tsunami victims. The song, featuring his vocals, was released on his self-titled album and Kuraki's album Over the Rainbow in 2012.

=== Handcraft Entertainment ===
Africk founded Handcraft Entertainment with the vision of globalizing the J-Pop genre and Japanese Cultural IP. Currently Handcraft and Africk represent artist, influencer and model Mia Takarabe, DJ and Model Shuzo, artist and models Hana Kuro and Anna Aya.

=== Entrepreneur ===
In 2006, Africk started his tech career when he co-founded XLR8 Mobile. He would go on to found Dijit and Inmoji as well.

Africk founded Inmoji in Boston in May 2014. Inmoji is a software company offering a software development kit to messaging apps and an extension for smartphones that both create clickable icons that enable users to share their favorite brands, products, and experiences directly within the apps without leaving the message. Inmoji raised $2.5 million in seed funding in 2015 and $6.5 million in Series A round in 2016.

Africk was named one of the 12 Top Tech Leaders To Watch In 2017 by Inc.

== Discography ==
=== Producer & Composer ===
Year	Title	Label	Album	Performer	Peak chart position	Certification & Units Sold RIAJ
1999	Love Day After Tomorrow	Giza Studio	Delicious Way	Mai Kuraki	Oricon #2 Japan Hot 100 (Billboard) #63	1X Million 1,400,000
2000	Delicious Way (Album)	Giza Studio	Delicious Way	Mai Kuraki	Oricon #1 (weekly & yearly)	3X Million 3,530,000
2000	Secret Of My Heart	Giza Studio	Delicious Way	Mai Kuraki	Oricon #2	1x Million 968,980 (physical sales) 100,000+ (digital sales)
2000	"Never Gonna Give You Up"	Giza Studio	Delicious Way	Mai Kuraki (ft.) Michael Africk	Weekly: #2 (Count Down TV), #2 (Oricon); Yearly: #58 (Count Down TV), #59 (Oricon)	2× Platinum 434,250
2000	Baby Tonight	Giza Studio	Delicious Way	Mai Kuraki		
2000	Stay By My Side	Giza Studio	Delicious Way	Mai Kuraki	Oricon #1	1X Million 922,140 (physical sales)
2000	Simply Wonderful	Giza Studio	Delicious Way	Mai Kuraki	Oricon #2	2× Platinum 600,000
2001	Perfect Crime (Album)	Giza Studio	Perfect Crime	Mai Kuraki	Oricon #1	JPN Million 1,600,000 6× Platinum
2001	Can't Forget Your Love/Perfect Crime	Giza Studio	Perfect Crime	Mai Kuraki	Oricon #2	2× Gold 180,040 (physical sales)
2001	Always	Giza Studio	Delicious Way	Mai Kuraki	Oricon #2	Platinum 200,000
2001	Come on! Come On!	Giza Studio	Perfect Crime	Mai Kuraki		
2001	Never Gonna Give You Up (Never Never Land Mix)	Giza Studio	Start in My Life	Mai Kuraki (ft.) Michael Africk)		
2001	Promised You	B-Gram	Toki no Tsubasa	Zard	Oricon #6	Gold 115,000 (physical sales)
2001	Toki no Tsubasa	B-Gram		Zard	Oricon #1	Platinum 371,000
2001	Reach For The Sky	Giza Studio	Perfect Crime	Mai Kuraki	Oricon #3	2× Platinum 486,320
2001	Tsumetai Umi (冷たい海)	Giza Studio	Perfect Crime	Mai Kuraki	Oricon #2	Platinum 400,000
2002	Fairy Tale (Album)	Giza Studio	Fairy Tale (Album)	Mai Kuraki	Oricon #1	3× Platinum 800,000
2002	What Can I Do	Giza Studio		Michael Africk		
2003	If I Believe (Album)	Giza Studio	If I Believe	Mai Kuraki	Oricon #1	2× Platinum 444,536
2003	Same	Giza Studio	If I Believe	Mai Kuraki		
2003	Just a Little Bit	Giza Studio	If I Believe	Mai Kuraki		
2003	Time After Time	Giza Studio	If I Believe	Mai Kuraki	Oricon #3	Gold 200,000
2003	Mi Corazon	Giza Studio	If I Believe	Mai Kuraki		
2004	Wish You The Best (Album)	Giza Studio	Wish You The Best	Mai Kuraki	Oricon #1	1x Million 956,162 (physical)
2005	Don't Cry	Madacy Records	The Fix	Jordan Knight		
2005	"Chocolate: Kimi no Santa ni Naritakute"		Mainichi Adventure	Sparkling Point		
2005	"Winter*Swear"	Giza Studio	Growing of My Heart	Mai Kuraki		
2007	Season Of Love	Northern Music	One Life	Mai Kuraki	Oricon #5	
2007	Silent Love	Northern Music	One Life	Mai Kuraki	Oricon #5	
2008	One Life (Album)	Northern Music	One Life	Mai Kuraki	Oricon #14	Gold
2011	"Kimi e"		Tenshi no Clover	Aimi		
2023	Someone Else	Handcraft Entertainment/Virgin Music/B ZONE		Anna Aya		
2024	Hit Me With Your Love	Handcraft Entertainment/Virgin Music/B ZONE		Anna Aya		
2024	Forever for you	Northern Music	Forever for you	Mai Kuraki	Oricon #3, Billboard #4	
2025	Be Romantic	Handcraft Entertainment/Virgin Music		Hana Kuro		
2025	Playboy	Handcraft Entertainment/Virgin Music		Hana Kuro		
2026	Heartless	Handcraft Entertainment/Virgin Music		Mia Takarabe x Steve Aoki	Billboard USA #10 Dance/Airplay	

=== Albums ===
Year	Title	Label
1999	Michael Africk	Hollywood Records
2011	Michael Africk II	Giza Studio

=== Singles ===
Year	Title	Writers	Producers	Label
1999	My Heart Belongs To You (Sexified)	Michael Africk, Perry Geyer, Miguel Pessoa	Michael Africk, Perry Geyer, Miguel Pessoa	Hollywood Records
2011	Make It Loud	Michael Africk, Louis Bell, Jordan Knight	Louis Bell	Handcraft Music
2011	No... Yeah (featuring Sammy Adams)	Michael Africk, Sammy Adams, Matty Trump	Louis Bell	Handcraft Music - MusicBall / Souldiggaz
2012	So Beautiful	Michael Africk, Louis Bell	Louis Bell, Michael Africk	Handcraft Music

=== Featured artist ===
Year	Title	Label	Album
2000	"Never Gonna Give You Up" (Mai Kuraki featuring Michael Africk)	Giza Studio	Delicious Way
2010	Boyfriend	Giza Studio	Future Kiss
2011	"Love One Another" (Mai Kuraki featuring Michael Africk)	Handcraft Music/Cybersound Music	Over the Rainbow

=== Music videos ===
Year	Song	Album	Director
2000	Never Gonna Give You Up	Delicious Way	
2011	"You Were Right" (live)	Michael Africk II	

== Accolades ==
=== Japan Gold Disc Awards ===
Year	Award	Category	Work	Credit	Result
2001	15th Japan Gold Disc Award	Pop & Rock Album of the Year	Delicious Way	Writer, Producer	Won
2001	15th Japan Gold Disc Award	Song of the Year	"Secret of My Heart"	Writer, Producer	Won
2002	16th Japan Gold Disc Award	Pop & Rock Album of the Year	Perfect Crime	Writer, Producer	Won
2003	17th Japan Gold Disc Award	Pop & Rock Album of the Year	Fairy Tale	Writer, Producer	Won
2004	18th Japan Gold Disc Award	Pop & Rock Album of the Year	If I Believe	Writer, Producer	Won
2005	19th Japan Gold Disc Award	Pop & Rock Album of the Year	Wish You the Best	Writer, Producer	Won
