= Fairy Tale (Mai Kuraki album) =

Studio album by Mai Kuraki
- Released: October 23, 2002
- Recorded: 2001–2002
- Genre: Pop, contemporary R&B
- Length: 56:37
- Label: Giza Studio
- Producer: Kanonji

Mai Kuraki chronology
Perfect Crime (2001)	Fairy Tale (2002)	If I Believe (2003)

Singles from Fairy Tale
- 1. "Can't Forget Your Love" Released: August 29, 2001; 2. "Winter Bells" Released: January 17, 2002; 3. "Feel Fine!" Released: April 24, 2002; 4. "Like a Star in the Night" Released: September 4, 2002

Fairy Tale is the third studio album by Japanese recording artist Mai Kuraki. It was released on October 23, 2002 under Giza Studio label.

== Background ==
The concept and theme of the album is "fairy tales". Considering that this would be the last album to be released in her teenage years, she has stated that she wanted it to reflect her beliefs, dreams and hopes in the past, present and for the future.

== Release and promotion ==
=== Singles ===
"Can't Forget Your Love" was released as the lead single from the album in August 2001. "Can't Forget Your Love" was released as a double A-side with "Perfect Crime: Single Edit". The song was written by Kuraki, Aika Ohno, Cybersound (Michael Africk, Perry Geyer, Miguel Sa Pessoa) and Akihito Tokunaga. It also served as the theme song to the 2001 Japanese TV program Ikiru tame no Jonetsu toshite no Satsujin. The single has sold over 180,040 copies and been certificated gold by RIAJ.

"Winter Bells" was released as the second single from the album in January 2002. "Winter Bells" was used as the tenth opening theme to the Case Closed anime. The song was written by Kuraki and Akihito Tokunaga. The song has sold over 258,310 copies and has been certificated platinum by RIAJ. It's known as Kuraki's first Christmas song.

"Feel Fine!" was released as the third single from the album in April 2002. "Feel Fine!" samples 80's surf rock influences. The song was written by Kuraki and Akihito Tokunaga. The song has sold over 451,500 copies and been certificated 2×platinum by RIAJ, making it the sixteenth best-selling single of 2002 in Japan. It was served as the commercial song to the American cosmetic brand Sea Breeze.

"Like a Star in the Night" was released as the fourth single from the album in September 2002. "Like a Star in the Night" was used as the Japanese theme to the 2000 American television series Dark Angel. The song was written by Kuraki, Aika Ohno, Akihito Tokunaga and Daisuke Ikeda. The single has sold over 119,550 copies and has been certificated gold by RIAJ.

== Commercial performance ==
Fairy Tale debuted at number-one on the Oricon Weekly Albums Chart with 404,010 copies sold making it Kuraki's third number-one debut. The album stayed on the Oricon albums chart for a total of 37 weeks (twenty more than her previous album Perfect Crime) of which the album spent 5 in the top 10, non-consecutively. Fairy Tale was the 23rd best selling album of 2002.

== Track listing ==
All lyrics are written by Mai Kuraki.

No.	Title	Music	Arranger(s)	Length
1.	"Fairy Tale (My Last Teenage Wish)"	Akihito Tokunaga	Tokunaga	4:18
2.	"Feel Fine!"	Tokunaga	Tokunaga	4:48
3.	"Ride on Time"	Tokunaga	Tokunaga	5:01
4.	"Key to My Heart"	Aika Ohno	Cybersound (Michael Africk, Perry Geyer, Miguel Pessoa)	3:33
5.	"Winter Bells"	Tokunaga	Tokunaga	4:37
6.	"Loving You..."	Ohno	Cybersound (Michael Africk, Perry Geyer, Miguel Pessoa)	5:18
7.	"Can't Forget Your Love"	Ohno	Cybersound (Michael Africk, Perry Geyer, Miguel Pessoa), Tokunaga	5:29
8.	"Trip in the Dream"	Tokunaga	Tokunaga	4:18
9.	"Not That Kind a Girl"	Yoko Blaqstone	Stone	4:27
10.	"Like a Star in the Night"	Ohno	Tokunaga	5:39
11.	"Fushigi no Kuni" (不思議の国 "Wonderland")	Ohno	Daisuke Ikeda	5:26
12.	"Fantasy"	Ohno	Tokunaga	3:49
Total length:				56:43

== Charts ==
=== Daily charts ===
Chart (2002)	Peak position
Japanese Albums Chart	1

=== Weekly charts ===
Chart (2002)	Peak position
Oricon Albums Chart	1

=== Monthly charts ===
Chart (2002)	Peak position
Japanese Albums Chart	1

=== Yearly charts ===
Chart (2002)	Peak position
Japanese Albums Chart	23

== Certification and sales ==
Region	Certification	Certified units/sales
Japan (RIAJ)	2× Platinum	800,000^{^}
^{^} Shipments figures based on certification alone.

== Cover ==
The composer of Key to my heart, Aika Ohno self-covered this song in her cover album Silent Passage.
