= If I Believe =

Studio album by Mai Kuraki
- Released: July 9, 2003
- Recorded: 2002–2003
- Genre: Pop, R&B
- Length: 45:50
- Label: Giza Studio
- Producer: Kanonji

Mai Kuraki chronology
Fairy Tale (2002)	If I Believe (2003)	Wish You the Best (2004)

Singles from If I Believe
- 1. "Make My Day" Released: December 4, 2002; 2. "Time After Time (Hana Mau Machi de)" Released: March 5, 2003; 3. "Kiss" Released: April 4, 2003; 4. "Kaze no La La La" Released: May 28, 2003

If I Believe is the fourth studio album by Japanese recording artist Mai Kuraki. It was released on July 9, 2003, only nine months after Fairy Tale.

== Commercial performance ==
If I Believe debuted at number one with 251,218 copies sold making it Kuraki's fourth number-one debut. The album stayed on the Oricon albums chart for a total of 20 weeks of which the album consecutively spent 4 in the top 10. If I Believe was the 24th best selling album of 2003.

== Track listing ==
All lyrics are written by Mai Kuraki except track 9 (co-written with Michael Africk) and 11 (co-written with Tokiko Nishimuro).

No.	Title	Music	Arranger(s)	Length
1.	"If I Believe"	Aika Ohno	Cybersound| (Michael Africk, Perry Geyer, Miguel Sa Pessoa)	3:43
2.	"Time After Time (Hana Mau Machi de) (Theater Version)"	Ohno	Daisuke Ikeda, Cybersound| (Michael Africk, Perry Geyer, Miguel Sa Pessoa)	4:12
3.	"Kaze no La La La"	Michiya Haruhata	Cybersound| (Michael Africk, Perry Geyer, Miguel Sa Pessoa)	4:22
4.	"Kiss"	Yoko Blaqstone	Cybersound| (Michael Africk, Perry Geyer, Miguel Sa Pessoa)	4:36
5.	"Mi Corazón"	Michael Africk, Perry Geyer, Miguel Sá Pessoa	M. Pessoa	4:14
6.	"I Don't Wanna Lose You"	Akihito Tokunaga	Tokunaga	4:06
7.	"Make My Day (Album Version)"	Tokunaga	Cybersound (Michael Africk, Perry Geyer, Miguel Sá Pessoa)	3:57
8.	"Same"	Michael Africk, Perry Geyer, Miguel Sá Pessoa, Johnny Risk	Michael Africk, Perry Geyer, Miguel Sá Pessoa, Johnny Risk	3:59
9.	"Just a Little Bit"	Michael Africk, Perry Geyer, Miguel Sá Pessoa, Johnny Risk		4:31
10.	"You Are Not the Only One"	Tokunaga	Cybersound Michael Africk, Perry Geyer, Miguel Sá Pessoa	4:02
11.	"Tonight, I Feel Close to You" (Duet with Stefanie Sun)	Ohno	Cybersound Michael Africk, Perry Geyer, Miguel Sá Pessoa	4:05
Total length:				45:50

== Charts and certifications ==
Chart (2003)	Peak position
Japan Oricon Daily Albums Chart	1
Japan Oricon Weekly Albums Chart	1
Japan Oricon Monthly Albums Chart	2
Japan Oricon Yearly Albums Chart	24

Country	Provider	Sales	Certification (sales thresholds)
Japan	RIAJ	444,536	2× Platinum
