= Yoko Blaqstone =

- Also known as: Yoko Ishiguro; Yoko Black. Stone; Yoko B. Stone
- Origin: Osaka Prefecture, Japan
- Genres: R&B; J-pop
- Occupations: Singer, songwriter, record producer, lecturer, entrepreneur
- Years active: 1997–present
- Labels: Styling Records; Giza Studio

Yoko Ishiguro, known professionally as Yoko Blaqstone, is a Japanese singer, songwriter, record producer, lecturer, and the owner of Japanese independent record label Piza Studio. Based in Osaka, Japan, she has worked with a range of popular Japanese artists, including Mai Kuraki, Zard and Yumi Shizukusa. Ishiguro signed with Styling Records in 1997 and released her first extended play 's All Right (1997), which has sold approximately 15,000 copies nationwide.

== Biography ==
=== 1997–1999: Debut as a solo singer ===
In 1997, Ishiguro signed with an independent record label Styling Records and released her first extended play 's All Right under the stage name Yoko Black. Stone. The extended play has sold more than 15,000 copies, attracting a big attention from the audience especially in Osaka, Japan.

In 1998, she released the lead single from her second extended play Long Fore-Play, "No Need 2 Worry". Ishiguro signed with a major label Giza Studio in 1999, and released "'s All Right" as the lead single from her first compilation album, The One About Me. The single peaked at number 74 on the Oricon Weekly Singles Chart.

In 1999, Japanese singer-songwriter Mai Kuraki covered Ishiguro's song "Baby I Like" and released it as her debut single in American market.

=== 2000–2004: Fame as a songwriter ===
After launching a career in Japan with "Love, Day After Tomorrow", Kuraki became one of the most successful singers in Japan in 2000's. Ishiguro wrote three songs for her debut album Delicious Way, which sold over 3,500,000 copies nationwide. After the success as a songwriter, Ishiguro started to launch the career as a songwriter for the artists including Zard, Yumi Shizukusa and Garnet Crow.

=== 2005-present: Back to My Base and Piza Studio ===
In 2005, Ishiguro released her first studio album Back to My Base under the name Yoko Blaqstone. This was her first release in six years, and remains as her last release as of June, 2020.

In 2014, she founded an independent record label Piza Studio and produced the debut extended play by Jam Flavor.

== Discography ==
=== Albums ===
==== Studio albums ====
Title	Album details
Back to My Base	Released: 16 March 2005; Label: Styling Records, Giza Studio; Format: CD, digital download

==== Compilation albums ====
Title	Album details
The One About Me	Released: 4 August 1999; Label: Styling Records, Giza Studio; Format: CD

=== Extended plays ===
Title	Album details
's All Right	Released: 11 November 1997; Label: Styling Records; Format: CD
Long Fore-Play	Released: 9 October 1998; Label: Styling Records; Format: CD

=== Singles ===
Single	Year	Peak chart positions	Album
Single	Year	JPN	Album
"'s All Right"	1998	—	's All Right
"No Need 2 Worry"	1998	—	The One About Me
"Calling U"	1998	—	's All Right
"'s All Right" (1999 re-release)	1999	73	The One About Me

== Songwriting credits ==
Title	Year	Album	Artist(s)
"Baby I Like"	1999	Secret of My Heart	Mai Kuraki
's All Right	1999	Secret of My Heart	Mai Kuraki
"Stepping ∞ Out"	2000	Delicious Way	Mai Kuraki
"Baby Tonight (You and Me)"	2000	Delicious Way	Mai Kuraki
"Can't Get Enough (Gimme Your Love)"	2000	Delicious Way	Mai Kuraki
"Get U're Dream" (Third version)	2000	Non-album song	Zard
"Think About"	2000	Perfect Crime	Mai Kuraki
