= Always (Mai Kuraki song) =

Single by Mai Kuraki

from the album Perfect Crime
- B-side: "All Night"
- Released: June 6, 2001
- Recorded: 2001
- Genre: J-pop
- Label: Giza Studio
- Songwriters: Mai Kuraki; Aika Ohno; Michael Africk, Perry Geyer, Miguel Sa Pessoa
- Producer: KANONJI

Mai Kuraki singles chronology
"Stand Up" (2001)	"Always" (2001)	"Can't Forget Your Love/Perfect Crime: Single Edit" (2001)

Music video
- "Always" on YouTube

"Always" (stylized as lower-caps) is a song by the Japanese singer Mai Kuraki. It was released on June 6, 2001, by Giza Studio and was used as the twelfth ending theme of the Japanese animated series Case Closed/Detective Conan, as well as the (ending) theme song of its fifth movie, Countdown to Heaven.

== Track listing ==
No.	Title	Writer(s)	Remixer	Length
1.	"Always"	Mai Kuraki; Aika Ohno; Cybersound; (Michael Africk, Perry Geyer, Miguel Sa Pessoa)		4:07
2.	"All Night"	Kuraki; Yoko Black. Stone		4:38
3.	"Stand Up" (Gomi's Disco 2001 Mix (Radio Edit))	Kuraki; Akihito Tokunaga	DJ Gomi	5:17
4.	"Always" (Instrumental)	Kuraki; Ohno; Cybersound; (Michael Africk, Perry Geyer, Miguel Sa Pessoa)

12" vinyl
No.	Title	Writer(s)	Length
1.	"Always"	Mai Kuraki; Aika Ohno; Cybersound
2.	"Always" (Instrumental)	Mai Kuraki; Aika Ohno; Cybersound

== Charts ==
=== Weekly charts ===
Chart (2001)	Peak position
Japan (Oricon)	2

=== Monthly charts ===
Chart (2001)	Peak position
Japan (Oricon)	7

=== Year-end charts ===
Chart (2001)	Position
Japan (Oricon)	80

== Certification and sales ==
Region	Certification	Certified units/sales
Japan (RIAJ)	Gold	200,000^{^}
^{^} Shipments figures based on certification alone.
