= Never Gonna Give You Up (Mai Kuraki song) =

2000 single by Mai Kuraki

Single by Mai Kuraki

from the album Delicious Way
- B-side: "Trying to Find My Way"
- Released: June 7, 2000
- Recorded: 1999–2000
- Genre: R&B
- Length: 4:01
- Label: Giza Studio; Giza Inc.; Tent House
- Songwriter(s): Mai Kuraki; Michael Africk
- Producer(s): Kanonji; Michael Africk; Miguel Sá Pessoa; Perry Geyer

Mai Kuraki singles chronology
"Secret of My Heart" (2000)	"Never Gonna Give You Up" (2000)	"Simply Wonderful" (2000)

"Never Gonna Give You Up" is a song recorded by Japanese singer Mai Kuraki. It was released on June 7, 2000, in Japan as a CD single and as a 12" vinyl by Giza Studio, Giza Inc., and Tent House as the fourth and final single from her debut studio album, Delicious Way (2000). The track features lyrics in Japanese and English language, written by Kuraki and Michael Africk, respectively. He also served as the single's composer, backing singer and producer, alongside Kanonji, Miguel Sá Pessoa, and Perry Geyer. The CD release of the track included the B-side recording "Trying to Find My Way". Musically, "Never Gonna Give You Up" is an R&B and pop song whose lyrics delve on themes of love and relationships, a common trait on its parent album.

Upon its release, "Never Gonna Give You Up" received a positive review from Alexey Eremenko, who contributed in writing the biography of Kuraki on American website AllMusic; he selected the track among Kuraki's best works. Commercially, the single experienced commercial success in Japan, reaching number two on the Oricon Singles Chart and the Count Down TV chart hosted by Tokyo Broadcasting System (TBS). The recording was certified Platinum by the Recording Industry Association of Japan (RIAJ) for physical shipments of 400,000 units in that region. In order to promote the single, an accompanying music video was released, with it portraying both Kuraki and Africk in a recording studio. The visual was included on some of the singer's Japanese concert tours and greatest hits compilations.

== Background and release ==
The track features lyrics in Japanese and English language, written by Kuraki and Michael Africk, respectively. He also served as the single's composer, backing singer and producer, alongside Kanonji, Miguel Sá Pessoa, and Perry Geyer. "Never Gonna Give You Up" was one of three songs from Kuraki's debut studio album, Delicious Way (2000), to have not been entirely written by her, and was one of the first tracks recorded for the album. It was originally intended for the singer's debut in the American music market in 1999, but ended being scrapped; it was subsequently featured on the Kuraki's only English language album, Secret of My Heart (2002). Musically, "Never Gonna Give You Up" is an R&B and pop song whose lyrics discuss on themes of love and relationships, a common trait on Delicious Way.

The recording was made available for consumption as the fourth and final single from the album on June 7, 2000 in Japan as a CD single through Giza Studio. The physical release included the original album track, its instrumental and a remix produced by Me-ya under his alias It's Tonight, alongside B-side track "Trying to Find My Way". The instrumental of the remixed version was later featured on a 12" vinyl distributed by Tent House—a subsidiary label owned by Giza Studios—two days later. On November 12, 2014, "Never Gonna Give You Up" was re-released digitally in Japan through Amazon and iTunes Store. (Note: "Never Gonna Give You Up" was digitally re-released in 2014 in conjunction with her compilation album, Mai Kuraki: Best 151A (Love and Hope), which was made available for consumption in the same year.)

== Reception ==
"Never Gonna Give You Up" received a positive review from Alexey Eremenko, who contributed in writing the biography of Kuraki on American website AllMusic; he selected the track among Kuraki's best works. Commercially, the single experienced commercial success in Japan. It debuted at number two on the Oricon Singles Chart with first-week sales of 284,780 copies, being only stalled from the top position by Ayumi Hamasaki's "Seasons" (2000). It spent seven weeks within the top 200. Likewise, "Never Gonna Give You Up" made its opening at the sophomore position of the Count Down TV chart hosted by Tokyo Broadcasting System (TBS), where it stayed for another consecutive week. The recording was present in the chart for seven weeks.

By the end of 2000, "Never Gonna Give You Up" was ranked at number 58 on Oricon's year-end chart, having brought total sales of 434,000 units as her fourth entry there. Similarly, it reached number 59 on TBS's annual ranking chart. The single was certified Platinum by the Recording Industry Association of Japan (RIAJ) for physical shipments of 400,000 units in that region. As of July 2016, it is Kuraki's seventh best-selling single in Japan based on Oricon's sales data base.

== Music video and promotion ==
In order to promote the single, an accompanying music video was released, with it featuring both Kuraki and Africk in a recording studio. The visual was included on Kuraki's video compilation First Cut (2002). During 2000 and 2001, the song was used for Japanese television MFTV's music show I'm a Music Freak. "Never Gonna Give You Up" has been performed on various concert tours conducted by Kuraki, including her 2001 Experience tour, her 2001 Loving You tour, her 5th Japan Anniversary tour, her 2007 Brilliant Cut tour, her 10th Anniversary tour, and her 2010 Happy Halloween tour in Japan. The single has also been featured on several greatest hits compilation albums released by the singer, including Wish You the Best (2004), All My Best (2009), and Mai Kuraki: Best 151A (Love and Hope) (2014).

== Track listing ==
- CD single
1. "Never Gonna Give You Up" – 4:01
2. "Trying to Find My Way" – 3:33
3. "Never Gonna Give You Up" (It's Tonight remix) – 5:04
4. "Never Gonna Give You Up" (Instrumental) – 4:01
- Digital download
1. "Never Gonna Give You Up" – 4:01
- 12" vinyl
1. "Never Gonna Give You Up" – 4:01
2. "Never Gonna Give You Up" (It's Tonight remix) – 5:04
3. "Never Gonna Give You Up" (It's Tonight remix) [Instrumental] – 5:04

== Credits and personnel ==
Credits adapted from the CD liner notes of "Never Gonna Give You Up".

Recording

- Recorded in Tokyo, Japan, 1999–2000.

Credits

- Mai Kuraki – songwriting, vocals, background vocals
- Michael Africk – songwriting, background vocals, composing, producing, keyboards, arranging
- Miguel Sá Pessoa – composing, producing, arranging, keyboards
- Perry Geyer – composing, arranging, producing
- DJ Me-Ya – remixing (track No. 3)
- Kanonji – producing, executive producing

== Charts ==
=== Weekly charts ===
Chart (2000)	Peak position
Japan (Count Down TV)	2
Japan (Oricon)	2

=== Yearly chart ===
Chart (2000)	Peak position
Japan (Count Down TV)	58
Japan (Oricon)	59

== Certification ==
Region	Certification	Certified units/sales
Japan (RIAJ)	Platinum	434,250

== Release history ==
Region	Date	Format	Label
Japan	June 7, 2000	CD single	Giza Studio; Giza Inc.
Japan	June 9, 2000	12" vinyl	Tent House
Japan	November 12, 2014	Digital download	Giza Studio; Giza Inc.; Northern Music
