= Stand Up (Mai Kuraki song) =

Single by Mai Kuraki

from the album Perfect Crime
- B-side: "Double Rainbow"
- Released: April 18, 2001
- Genre: J-pop
- Length: 4:36
- Label: Giza Studio
- Songwriters: Mai Kuraki (lyrics); Akihito Tokunaga (melody)
- Producer: Kanonji

Mai Kuraki singles chronology
"Tsumetai Umi/Start in My Life" (2000)	"Stand Up" (2001)	"Always" (2001)

"Stand Up" is a song by Japanese singer-songwriter Mai Kuraki from her second studio album, Perfect Crime (2001). It was released as the third single from the album on April 18, 2001. The lyrics to the song were penned by Kuraki and the track was produced by Akihito Tokunaga. The single peaked at number two on the Oricon Singles Chart and was certified platinum by the Recording Industry Association of Japan (RIAJ). It has sold about 476,000 copies in Japan as of October 2014. The single's jacket image was compared to that of Bruce Springsteen's Born to Run (1975).

== Track listing ==
All lyrics are written by Mai Kuraki.

Maxi single
No.	Title	Music	Arranger	Length
1.	"Stand Up"	Akihito Tokunaga	Tokunaga	4:36
2.	"Double Rainbow"	Yoko Blaqstone	Yoko. Black Stone	4:42
3.	"Yes or No" (Trance Continental Remix (Radio Edit))	Aika Ohno	Johnny Vicious; DJ Koutarou.A	5:38
4.	"Stand Up (Instrumental)"	Tokunaga	Tokunaga	4:36
Total length:				18:52

12" vinyl
No.	Title	Writer(s)	Arranger(s)	Length
1.	"Stand Up" (Gomi's Disco 2001 Mix)	Mai Kuraki; Akihito Tokunaga	DJ Gomi
2.	"Yes or No" (Trance Continental Mix)	Kuraki; Ohno	Johnny Vicious; DJ Koutarou.A

== Charts and certifications ==
=== Charts ===
Chart (2001)	Peak position
Oricon Weekly Singles Chart	2
Oricon Yearly Singles Chart	32

=== Certifications ===
Country	Provider	Certifications
Japan	RIAJ	Platinum
