= Secret of My Heart =

2000 single by Mai Kuraki

Single by Mai Kuraki

from the album Delicious Way
- B-side: "This Is Your Life"
- Released: April 26, 2000
- Genre: J-pop; R&B
- Length: 4:24
- Label: Giza Studio
- Songwriters: Mai Kuraki, Aika Ohno,
- Producer: KANNONJI

Mai Kuraki singles chronology
"Stay by My Side" (2000)	"Secret of My Heart" (2000)	"Never Gonna Give You Up" (2000)

Music video
- "Secret of My Heart" on YouTube

"Secret of My Heart" is a song by Japanese singer songwriter Mai Kuraki, taken from her debut album Delicious Way (2000). It was released on April 26, 2000, and peaked at number two on the Oricon Weekly Singles Chart.

It was used as an ending theme for the anime series Detective Conan, for which she would later sing 20 more theme songs. "Secret of My Heart" was certificated Million by Recording Industry Association of Japan and won the Japan Gold Disc Award for Song of the Year.

== Commercial performance ==
"Secret of My Heart" debuted at number two on the Oricon Weekly Singles Chart with 410,550 physical copies sold. The song charted on the chart for 16 weeks and has sold over 968,980 physical copies. "Secret of My Heart" became the singer's second best-selling song behind "Love, Day After Tomorrow" (1999) and has been certificated Million for physical sales and Gold for digital sales by Recording Industry Association of Japan.

== Track listing ==
No.	Title	Writer(s)	Arranger(s)	Length
1.	"Secret of My Heart"	Mai Kuraki; Aika Ohno	Cybersound Michael Africk, Perry Geyer, Miguel Sa Pessoa	4:24
2.	"This is Your Life"	Kuraki; Ohno	Cybersound Michael Africk, Perry Geyer, Miguel Sa Pessoa	4:08
3.	"Secret of My Heart" (Runnin'around at the "Village" Mix)	Kuraki; Ohno	Division of Mark	6:44
4.	"Secret of My Heart" (Instrumental)	Kuraki; Ohno	Cybersound Michael Africk, Perry Geyer, Miguel Sa Pessoa	4:24

12" vinyl
No.	Title	Writer(s)	Arranger(s)	Length
1.	"Secret of My Heart" (Mark Of the Division Mix)	Mai Kuraki; Aika Ohno	Division of Mark
2.	"Secret of My Heart" ("Vanguard" After Hours Session's Mix)	Kuraki; Ohno

== Charts ==
=== Weekly charts ===
Chart (2000)	Peak position
Japan (Oricon)	2

=== Monthly charts ===
Chart (2000)	Peak position
Japan (Oricon)	3

=== Year-end charts ===
Chart (2000)	Position
Japan (Oricon)	16

== Certification and sales ==
Region	Certification	Certified units/sales
Japan (RIAJ)	Million	968,980 (physical sales)
Japan (RIAJ)	Gold	100,000+ (digital sales)
