= Tsumetai Umi/Start in My Life =

Single by Mai Kuraki

from the album Perfect Crime
- Released: February 7, 2001
- Recorded: 2001
- Genre: J-pop
- Label: Giza Studio
- Producer(s): Kanonji

Mai Kuraki singles chronology
"Reach for the Sky" (2000)	"Tsumetai Umi/Start in My Life" (2001)	"Stand Up" (2001)

"Tsumetai Umi/Start in My Life (冷たい海/Start in My Life)" is Mai Kuraki's seventh single, released on February 7, 2001. "Start in My Life" was used as the 11th ending theme to the Case Closed anime series.

== Track listing ==
CD single
No.	Title	Writer(s)	Length
1.	"Tsumetai Umi (冷たい海)"	Mai Kuraki; Aika Ohno; Cybersound; (Michael Africk, Perry Geyer, Miguel Pessoa)	4:40
2.	"Start in My Life"	Kuraki; Ohno; Cybersound	5:09
3.	"Never Gonna Give You Up" (Never Never Land Mix One)	Kuraki; Michael Africk; Miguel Sá Pessoa; Perry Geyer	5:38
4.	"Tsumetai Umi (冷たい海)" (Instrumental)	Kuraki; Ohno; Cybersound	4:40
5.	"Start in My Life" (Instrumental)	Kuraki; Ohno; Cybersound	5:09

== Charts ==
=== Weekly charts ===
Chart (2001)	Peak position
Japan (Oricon)	2

=== Monthly charts ===
Chart (2001)	Peak position
Japan (Oricon)	5

=== Year-end charts ===
Chart (2001)	Position
Japan (Oricon)	52

== Certification and sales ==
Region	Certification	Certified units/sales
Japan (RIAJ)	Platinum	400,000^{^}
^{^} Shipments figures based on certification alone.
