= Delicious Way =

Studio album by Mai Kuraki
- Released: June 28, 2000
- Genres: R&B; pop; electronica
- Length: 45:51
- Label: Giza Studio
- Producer: Kanonji

Mai Kuraki chronology
Delicious Way (2000)	Perfect Crime (2001)

Singles from Delicious Way
- 1. "Love, Day After Tomorrow" Released: December 8, 1999; 2. "Stay by My Side" Released: March 5, 2000; 3. "Secret of My Heart" Released: April 26, 2000; 4. "Never Gonna Give You Up" Released: June 7, 2000

Delicious Way (stylized in all lowercase) is the debut album by Japanese recording artist Mai Kuraki. It was released by Giza Studio and Giza Inc. in Japan on June 28, 2000. Kuraki co-wrote the entire album, with assistance from Michael Africk and Yoko Blaqstone on some tracks, while Kanonji handled production. Development for the album began in mid-to-late 1999, following Kuraki's American debut single "Baby I Like", after which East West Records and Giza Studio sent her back to Japan. Four singles were released to promote the album: "Love, Day After Tomorrow" (which sold over 1.3 million units in Japan), "Stay by My Side", "Secret of My Heart", and "Never Gonna Give You Up".

Musically, Delicious Way is an R&B album influenced by 1980s-inspired pop music, hip-hop, and soul music. Upon its release, the album received positive reviews from music critics. Critics commended the composition and her songwriting skills, with some highlighting the singles as standout tracks. Commercially, the album was a significant success in Japan, peaking at number one on the Oricon Albums Chart. It achieved the second-highest first-week sales for a solo artist at the time and sold over 3.5 million units in Japan, becoming one of the List of best-selling albums in Japan. The album's success earned Kuraki the Japan Gold Disc Award for "Rock Album of the Year".

== Background and composition ==
While in high school in Japan, Kuraki sent a demo tape to Giza Studio, who signed her to their label. Giza Studio then sent Kuraki to the United States, where she released her debut single "Baby I Like". The track impressed executives at East West Records, leading the label to distribute it. However, it failed to chart on any Billboard chart there. Subsequently, Giza Studio enlisted Kanonji to produce her debut album. Kuraki served as the primary songwriter, with assistance from Michael Africk on "Baby Tonight (You & Me)" and "Never Gonna Give You Up", and Yoko Blaqstone on "Can't Get Enough (Gimme Your Love)". The label also hired American producers/songwriters Cybersound (Michael Africk, Perry Geyer, Miguel Pessoa) to arrange and mix most of the songs on Delicious Way, with Stone's assistance. Delicious Way was not engineered in North America, unlike most of Cybersound's other work.

The album's music was composed by Aika Ohno, Stone, Tomoo Kasahara, Miguel Sá Pessoa, Perry Geyer (of Cybersound), Masataka Kitaura, and Michael Africk. According to a staff member from CD Journal, Delicious Way is an R&B album with influences of pop music. Most of the album's lyrics include some English language phrases, while "Baby Tonight (You & Me)", "Never Gonna Give You Up", and "Can't Get Enough (Gimme Your Love)" are predominantly in English.

== Release and promotion ==
Delicious Way was released in Japan by Giza Studio and Giza Inc. on June 28, 2000. The album contains 11 tracks and was released in both physical and digital formats. The cover sleeve, photographed by Miho Mori, features a slightly sepia-tinted image of Mai Kuraki in front of a blurry background. Four singles were released to support the album. The first single was "Love, Day After Tomorrow", released on December 8, 1999. It was successful in Japan, reaching number two on the Oricon Singles Chart and number 63 on the Japan Hot 100 chart. It was certified in two categories by the Recording Industry Association of Japan (RIAJ) and sold over 1.3 million physical units and 100,000 digital copies in the region.

The second single, "Stay by My Side", was released on March 15, 2000. The single sold nearly one million units in Japan and became her first single to reach number one on the Oricon Singles Chart. It was certified double platinum by the RIAJ for shipments of 800,000 units. "Secret of My Heart", the album's third single, was released on April 26, 2000. It peaked at number two on the Oricon Singles Chart and was certified Million by the RIAJ for physical shipments of one million units. It has sold 968,980 physical units and 100,000 digital copies in the region. The album's final single was "Never Gonna Give You Up", released on June 7, 2000. Despite selling 434,250 units in Japan, the lowest sales for a single from Delicious Way, it reached number two on the Oricon Singles Chart and received a Platinum certification from the RIAJ.

== Reception and legacy ==
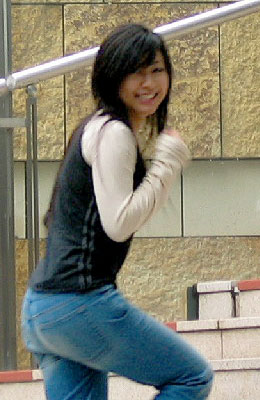
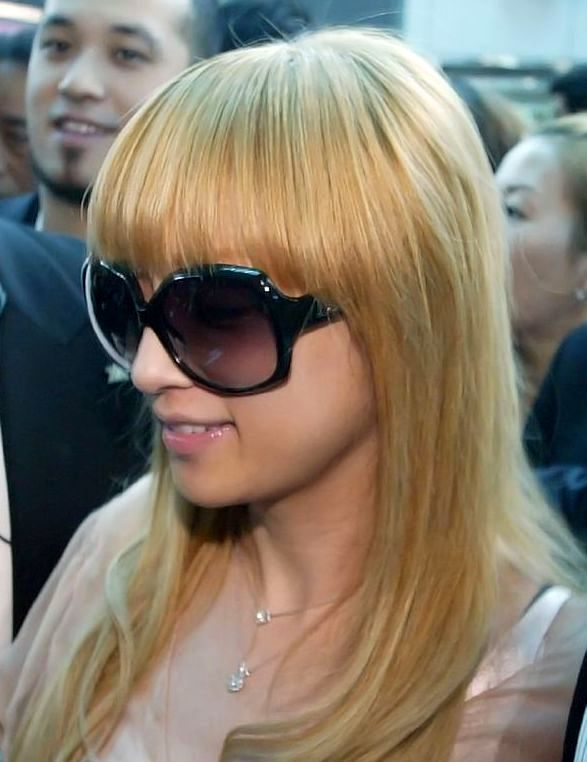
Delicious Way is the fifth highest selling album by a female artist, behind three entries by Hikaru Utada (left) and one entry by Ayumi Hamasaki (right).

Upon its release, Delicious Way received favorable reviews from music critics. A staff member from CD Journal enjoyed the album, highlighting "Stepping Out", "Can't Get Enough (Gimme Your Love)", "Everything's All Right", "Happy Days", and "Kimi to no Jikan" as standout tracks. Retrospectively, Alexey Eremenko, who wrote Kuraki's biography for AllMusic, highlighted "Delicious Way", "Love, Day After Tomorrow", "Never Gonna Give You Up", and "Secret of My Heart" as some of her greatest work. At the 15th Japan Gold Disc Awards in 2001, Delicious Way won "Best Rock Album of the Year". Her single "Secret of My Heart" also received a "Song of the Year" award among 13 recipients.

The album was highly successful in Japan. It debuted at number one on the Oricon Albums Chart with 2,218,640 units sold, achieving the highest first-week sales for a debut album in Japanese music history and the sixth highest overall. It stayed at the top for two consecutive weeks and remained in the top 10 for nine consecutive weeks. By the end of 2000, Delicious Way had sold 3.45 million units in Japan, becoming the highest-selling album of the year. As of July 2016, Delicious Way had sold over 3.5 million units in Japan, making it the ninth best-selling album in Japan of all time. It is also the third best-selling debut album, behind Globe's self-titled album and Hikaru Utada's First Love), and the fourth highest-selling studio album by a female artist. (Note: Delicious Way is the fourth highest selling studio album by a female artist in Japan, but is the fifth highest overall (having been beaten by Ayumi Hamasaki's album A Best)) Eremenko stated that the album's sales were a milestone in Japan, but commented "Kuraki never topped these results (both singles and album), but neither did she fizzle out after the debut."

In 2015, Kuraki paid tribute to the album by re-creating its artwork for her greatest hits compilation Mai Kuraki Best 151A: Love & Hope. Arama Japan staff commented that she "recreat[ed] the iconic fresh faced and plain clothed cover with her calm facial expression." According to the staff, the album is a classic and helped the singer define "her spot in the Japanese music industry."

== Track listing ==
All lyrics are written by Mai Kuraki except track 5, 7 (co-written with Michael Africk) and track 6 (co-written with Yoko Blaqstone)

CD and digital download.
No.	Title	Music	Arranger(s)	Length
1.	"Delicious Way"	Aika Ohno	Cybersound (Michael Africk, Perry Geyer, Miguel Sa Pessoa)	3:50
2.	"Love, Day After Tomorrow"	Ohno	Cybersound (Michael Africk, Perry Geyer, Miguel Sa Pessoa)	4:02
3.	"Secret of My Heart"	Ohno	Cybersound (Michael Africk, Perry Geyer, Miguel Sa Pessoa)	4:24
4.	"Stepping ∞ Out"	Yoko Blaqstone	Yoko Blaqstone	4:38
5.	"Baby Tonight (You & Me)"	Stone, Tomoo Kasahara	Stone	3:59
6.	"Can't Get Enough (Gimme Your Love)"	Stone	Cybersound (Michael Africk, Perry Geyer, Miguel Sa Pessoa)	3:42
7.	"Never Gonna Give You Up"	Michael Africk, Miguel Sá Pessoa, Perry Geyer	Cybersound (Michael Africk, Perry Geyer, Miguel Sa Pessoa)	3:59
8.	"Stay by My Side"	Ohno	Cybersound (Michael Africk, Perry Geyer, Miguel Sa Pessoa)	4:26
9.	"Everything's All Right"	Masataka Kitaura	Cybersound (Michael Africk, Perry Geyer, Miguel Sa Pessoa)	4:07
10.	"Happy Days"	Ohno	Cybersound (Michael Africk, Perry Geyer, Miguel Sa Pessoa)	4:18
11.	"Kimi to no Jikan" (君との時間 "My Time With You")	Kasahara	Cybersound (Michael Africk, Perry Geyer, Miguel Sa Pessoa)	4:15
Total length:				45:51

Chinese edition
No.	Title	Music	Length
12.	"Love, Day After Tomorrow" (China Beat Mix)	Ohno	4:21

== Personnel ==
Credits adapted from the CD liner notes of Delicious Way.

- Mai Kuraki – vocals, backing vocals, songwriting
- Aika Ohno – composer, backing vocals
- Cybersound – tracking, arranging, mixing
- Yoko Blaqstone – composer, backing vocals, tracking, arranging
- Michael Africk – backing vocals, tracking, arranging, composer, songwriting
- Miguel Sá Pessoa – composer, tracking, mixing
- Perry Geyer – composer, tracking, recording
- Masatake Kitaura – composing
- Tomoo Kasahara – composing
- Gan Kojima – art direction
- Tokiko Nishimuro – direction
- Yasuko Yamamoto – co-direction
- Akio Nakajima – mixing, recording
- Takayuki Ichikawa – mixing, recording
- DJ Dopejack – musician
- Greg Hawkes – musician
- Larry Thomas – musician
- Miho Mori – photography
- Kanonji – producer, executive producer
- Katsuyuki Yoshimatsu – recording
- Sawako Ryuko – mixing
- Shigeru Kajita – mixing

== Charts ==
=== Weekly charts ===
Chart (2000)	Peak position
Japanese Albums (Oricon)	1

=== Yearly charts ===
Chart (2000)	Peak position
Japanese Albums (Oricon)	1

=== Decade-end charts ===
Chart (2000–2009)	Position
Japanese Albums (Oricon)	4

=== All-time charts ===
Chart	Position
Japanese Albums (Oricon)	9

== Certification and sales ==
Region	Certification	Certified units/sales
Japan (RIAJ)	3× Million	3,530,420

== Release history ==
Region	Date	Format	Label
Japan	June 28, 2000	CD	Giza Studio
Japan	2008	Digital download	Giza Studio; Giza Inc.

== See also ==
- Mai Kuraki discography
- List of Oricon number-one albums of 1999
- Lists of fastest-selling albums
- List of best-selling albums in Japan
