= Stay by My Side =

Single by Mai Kuraki

from the album Delicious Way
- Released: March 15, 2000
- Genre: J-pop; R&B
- Length: 4:26
- Label: Giza Studio
- Songwriter(s): Aika Ohno; Mai Kuraki; Cybersound; (Michael Africk, Perry Geyer, Miguel Sa Pessoa)
- Producer(s): Kannonji

Mai Kuraki singles chronology
"Love, Day After Tomorrow" (1999)	"Stay by My Side" (2000)	"Secret of My Heart" (2000)

Music video
- "Stay by My Side" on YouTube

"Stay by My Side" a song recorded by Japanese singer Mai Kuraki. It was released on March 15, 2000, as the second single from Kuraki's debut studio album, Delicious Way (2000). It was written by Kuraki, Aika Ohno, and the Boston-based music production team, Cybersound (Michael Africk, Perry Geyer, Miguel Sa Pessoa). It is a gospel-infused J-pop and R&B song that talks about the protagonist's dream to be with her partner as long as possible.

The single debuted atop on the Oricon Weekly Singles chart, becoming Kuraki's first number-one single on that chart. On the Oricon chart for the third week of May in 2000, the first three of her singles, "Love, Day After Tomorrow", "Stay by My Side", and "Secret of My Heart" charted inside top 15 simultaneously.

== Track listing ==
All lyrics are written by Mai Kuraki

CD
No.	Title	Music	Arranger(s)	Length
1.	"Stay by My Side"	Aika Ohno	Cybersound (Michael Africk, Perry Geyer, Miguel Sa Pessoa)	4:26
2.	"Just Like Your Smile Baby"	Masataka Kitaura	Cybersound (Michael Africk, Perry Geyer, Miguel Sa Pessoa)	4:05
3.	"Love, Day After Tomorrow" (Day Tripper Drum'n' Bass Mix)	Aika Ohno	Cybersound Cybersound (Michael Africk, Perry Geyer, Miguel Sa Pessoa), Shaun D. Rosenberg	4:52
4.	"Stay by My Side" (Instrumental)	Aika Ohno	Cybersound (Michael Africk, Perry Geyer, Miguel Sa Pessoa)	4:26

== Credits and personnel ==
Credits adapted from the liner notes of the CD single.

- Mai Kuraki – vocals, backing vocals, songwriting
- Aika Ohno - composer
- Masataka Kitaura – composer
- Michael Africk – backing vocals, sound producer, keyboards
- Perry Geyer – computer programming, sound producer
- Greg Hawkes – keyboards
- Miguel Sá Pessoa – keyboards, mix
- Toast (Shaun D. Rosenberg) – DJ
- Cybersound - DJ, tracking
- Kanonji – production, executive producer

== Charts ==
=== Weekly charts ===
Chart (2000)	Peak position
Japan Oricon (Oricon)	1

=== Monthly charts ===
Chart (2000)	Peak position
Japan Oricon (Oricon)	2

=== Year-end charts ===
Chart (2000)	Peak position
Japan Oricon (Oricon)	17

== Certifications and sales ==
Region	Certification	Certified units/sales
Japan (RIAJ)	Million	922,140 (physical sales)
