= Love, Day After Tomorrow =

Single by Mai Kuraki

from the album Delicious Way
- B-side: "Everything's All Right"
- Released: December 8, 1999
- Recorded: 1999
- Genre: J-pop; R&B; synth-pop; electronica
- Length: 4:05
- Label: Giza Studio; Tent House
- Songwriters: Mai Kuraki, Aika Ohno
- Producer: Kanonji

Mai Kuraki singles chronology
"Baby I Like" (1999)	"Love, Day After Tomorrow" (1999)	"Stay by My Side" (2000)

"Love, Day After Tomorrow" is a song recorded by Japanese singer Mai Kuraki, taken as the lead single of her debut studio album Delicious Way (2000). It was released on December 8, 1999, via Giza Studio and Tent House in two physical editions: a CD single and 12-inch vinyl. The track was written by Kuraki herself, while production was handled by Kanonji. The conception of the song started after the commercial failure of her English language single "Baby I Like", which led her American label Bip! Records to send her back to Japan, and she subsequently reverted to the Japanese market.

Musically, "Love, Day After Tomorrow" is a pop recording that incorporates elements of R&B, Synth-pop, and teen music, and lyrically discusses about themes of love. Upon its release, the single received positive reviews from music critics, who praised the single's commercial quality and production, but some noted similarities to rising Japanese-American artist, Hikaru Utada. Commercially, it experienced success in Japan, reaching number two on the Oricon Singles Chart and was certified million by the Recording Industry Association of Japan (RIAJ) for shipments of one million copies. Despite not charting in North America, it sold over 5,000 copies.

An accompanying music video was directed and released in December 1999; it features the singer in a white-black room and shares intercut scenes with various locations in New York City and Japan. In order to promote the single, Kuraki performed it on several nationwide concert tours, and added it to greatest hits albums including All My Best (2009) and Mai Kuraki Best 151A: Love & Hope (2014). Since its release, it has become the singer's best-selling single and has sold over 1.385 million units in Japan, ranking it among many other best-selling entries.

== Background and composition ==
In 1999, Kuraki sent Japanese label Giza Studio a demo tape of various compositions she had recorded, in order to secure a contract with them. Despite them being impressed by her performance, they signed her with American label Bip! Records, and sent her to New York City in the United States to debut in that region. This attributed to her debut single "Baby I Like", which was recorded in English language, and would coincide with her then-upcoming English studio album. The track impressed executives at East West Records, prompting the label to distribute it. However, because it failed to chart on any Billboard chart there, her label dropped her and sent her back to Japan, where she began recording new material for a Japanese debut.

From the bunch, "Love, Day After Tomorrow" was written solely by Kuraki, while production was handled by Kanonji. Furthermore, it was composed by Aika Ohno and arranged by American music team Cybersound (Michael Africk, Perry Geyer, Miguel Pessoa). Because of Kuraki's experience with English, she wrote some lyrics and phrases in that language. Musically, "Love, Day After Tomorrow" is a pop recording that incorporates elements of R&B and teen music, and lyrically discusses about themes of love. In an article from Japanese magazine CD Journal, a contributing editor compared the music to Western culture in the 1990s. AllMusic's Alexey Eremenko agreed, comparing the sound to the likes of Whitney Houston and Michael Jackson.

== Release and reception ==
"Love, Day After Tomorrow" was taken as the lead single from Kuraki's debut record, Delicious Way (2000), and serves as her Japanese debut. It premiered in Japan on December 8, 1999 via Giza Studio in two physical editions; a CD single and 12" vinyl. The compact disc included the original recording, an additional B-side titled "Everything's All Right"—along with a bonus remix—, plus the single's instrumental composition. Furthermore, the vinyl release was issued on March 8, 2000, and included two numbers on each side; the original song, and a Day Tripper Drum N' Bass mix, whilst the reverse side had the same listing for "Everything's All Right". Upon its release, the single received positive reviews from music critics. A member of CD Journal praised the singers vocals and the tracks production, but compared its sound and commercial appeal to the works of another rising Japanese artist at the time, Hikaru Utada. Furthermore, Alexey Eremenko of AllMusic selected it amongst her best singles.

Commercially, "Love, Day After Tomorrow" experienced success in Japan. It entered the weekly Oricon Singles Chart at number eighteen, selling 29,510 copies in its first week. The single was a sleeper hit, selling 113,280 copies and peaking at number two on its tenth week on the chart. It charted on Oricon for a total of thirty weeks. The single also peaked at number two on Japan's TBS Count Down TV Chart on March 4, 2000; it stayed there for two consecutive weeks, and lasted 28 weeks in the chart. By the end of 2000, Oricon ranked the single at number four on their year-end chart, with estimated sales of 1,385,190 units; this stands as Kuraki's best-selling single, and was the second highest entry by a female artist, only behind Utada's "Wait & See (Risk)" which placed at number three. It was certified million by the Recording Industry Association of Japan (RIAJ) for shipments of one million units. "Love, Day After Tomorrow" was placed at number six on TBS' Annual Count Down TV chart in 2000. The company also listed it as the 99th best-selling single in Japanese history, her only entry to date. According to CD Journal, more than 5,000 copies were pre-ordered and sold in the United States. After the release of the singers compilation All My Best in 2009, the song appeared at number 64 on the Japan Hot 100, published by Billboard. It was certified gold by the RIAJ for digital sales of 100,000 copies.

== Promotion ==
An accompanying music video was directed and produced for the singers DVD compilation First Cut (2000), as her management had no prior plans to create a visual for the single. It features the singer in a black and white room, singing the song in front of a chair. The clip has intercut scenes with various locations in New York City and Japan, showing the lifestyles of several people in the cities. To celebrate the artist's third greatest hits album, Kuraki uploaded a new version of the video that featured numerous scenes that were taken by 15 different directors. Japanese musician Aika Ohno, who served as the composer to the track, covered the song in English language and appeared on her debut record Shadows of Dreams (2002).

In order to promote the single, Kuraki performed it on several nationwide concert tours. Its first appearance was on her Experience Live Tour, which commenced in early 2001, and was included on her Loving You... Tour the following year. Between 2003 and 2004, the singer added it to the set list of her Fairy Tale concert tour, and was used as one of the opening numbers to her 5th Anniversary show. It followed as an encore to her Diamond Wave 2006 tour, her 2008 Touch Me concert, her 10th anniversary tour, and her Happy Halloween Concert tour at. Saitama Super Arena. On January 14, 2017, the singer, alongside vocalists Shizuka, Ami and Reina Washio from Japanese band E-girls, performed a new rendition of the track on Music Fair.

== Track listing ==
All lyrics are written by Mai Kuraki.

CD single
No.	Title	Music	Arranger(s)	Length
1.	"Love, Day After Tomorrow"	Aika Ohno	Cybersound (Michael Africk, Perry Geyer, Miguel Pessoa)	4:05
2.	"Everything's All Right"	Masataka Kitaura	Cybersound (Michael Africk, Perry Geyer, Miguel Pessoa)	4:09
3.	"Everything's All Right" (Remix)	Kitaura	Cybersound (Michael Africk, Perry Geyer, Miguel Pessoa) Remixed by Perry Geyer	5:10
4.	"Love, Day After Tomorrow" (Instrumental)	Ohno	Cybersound (Michael Africk, Perry Geyer, Miguel Pessoa)	4:05

12" vinyl
No.	Title	Music	Arranger(s)	Length
1.	"Love, Day After Tomorrow"	Aika Ohno	Cybersound (Michael Africk, Perry Geyer, Miguel Pessoa)	4:05
2.	"Love, Day After Tomorrow" (Day Tripper Drum'n' Bass Mix)	Ohno	Cybersound, (Michael Africk, Perry Geyer, Miguel Pessoa) Remixed by Toast	4:52
3.	"Everything's All Right"	Masataka Kitaura	Cybersound (Michael Africk, Perry Geyer, Miguel Pessoa) Remixed by Toast	4:09
4.	"Everything's All Right" (Remix)	Masataka Kitaura	Cybersound (Michael Africk, Perry Geyer, Miguel Pessoa) Remixed by Perry Geyer	5:10

== Credits and personnel ==
Credits adapted from the liner notes of the CD single;

Production and management

- Recorded in mid-1999 at Giza Studios by Kanonji.

Credits

- Mai Kuraki – vocals, backing vocals, songwriting
- Aika Ohno - composer
- Masataka Kitaura – composer
- Michael Africk – sound producer, backing vocals, remix
- Perry Geyer – computer programming, remix, sound producer, engineer
- Greg Hawkes – keyboards
- Miguel Sá Pessoa – keyboards, mix
- Kevin Schoenbohm – backing vocals
- DJ Dopejack – DJ
- Leon Zervos – mastering
- Toast (Shaun D. Rosenberg) – remix
- Kanonji – production, executive producer

== Charts and sales ==
=== Charts ===
==== Weekly charts ====
Chart (1999–2000)	Peak position
Japan Singles (Oricon)	2
Japan Count Down TV Singles Chart (TBS)	2

Chart (2009)	Peak position
Japan Hot 100 (Billboard)	63

==== Year-end charts ====
Chart (2000)	Peak position
Japan Singles (Oricon)	4
Japan Count Down TV Singles Chart (TBS)	6

=== Certifications and sales ===
Region	Certification	Certified units/sales
Japan (RIAJ)	Million	1,400,000(physical sales)
Japan (RIAJ)	Gold	100,000 (digital sales)
United States (RIAA)	—N/a	5,000
