= Mai Kuraki videography =

Japanese singer-songwriter Mai Kuraki has released twenty-five video albums and three video singles, and been featured in sixty-six music videos, two television series, and eleven commercials. Kuraki debuted in 1999, while she was still in high school, through Giza Studio. The label initially marketed Kuraki in the United States under the name Mai K, and released the single "Baby I Like" (1999). However, the single was a commercial failure which prompted the label to send her back to Japan. There, they released her single "Love, Day After Tomorrow", which peaked at number two on the Oricon Singles Chart and was certified million by the Recording Industry Association of America (RIAJ). The second single, "Stay by My Side" became her first number one single on the chart. Kuraki's debut album, Delicious Way, topped the Oricon Albums Chart and was certified triple million by the RIAJ.

In 2001, her second album Perfect Crime was released, and it became another million seller, certified quadruple-platinum by the RIAJ. "Winter Bells", released in 2002 became her second number one single on the Oricon Singles Chart, and its parent album, Fairy Tale, topped the Albums Chart. It sold over 700,000 copies in Japan and earned a triple-platinum certification from the RIAJ. The albums If I Believe (2003), Wish You the Best (2004), Fuse of Love (2005), and Diamond Wave (2005) all charted within the top three of the Albums Chart. Both If I Believe and Wish You the Best peaked at number one on the Albums Chart. The former sold over 400,000 copies and was certified two-times platinum by the RIAJ while the latter sold more than 950,000 copies and was certified million by the RIAJ. Kuraki's next studio album release, One Life (2008) charted outside the top 10, peaking at number 14 on the Albums Chart. However, the follow-up to One Life titled Touch Me! (2009) peaked at number one, earning a gold certification. Her second compilation album All My Best (2009) sold over 250,000 copies in Japan and was certificated platinum. The follow-up albums Future Kiss (2010) and Over the Rainbow (2012) peaked at number 3 and 2, respectively, on the Oricon Albums Chart. Her third compilation album Mai Kuraki Best 151A: Love & Hope (2014) sold over 67,000 copies and was certificated gold. Her 11th album Smile (2017) sold only 29,000 copies in Japan and failed commercially but its follow-up single Togetsukyo (Kimi Omou) become her best-selling song in 2010's.

She has also collaborated with Tak Matsumoto of B'z on the single "Imitation Gold", which peaked at number one on the Oricon Singles Chart. In 2009, she was featured on the single "Sunao ni Ienakute" by Zard, a rearranged version of the band's 1999 song of the same title. The single peaked at number five on the Oricon Singles Chart.

== Music videos ==
=== As lead artist ===
Title	Year	Director	Video album
"Baby I Like"	1999	Masashi Ohishi	First Cut
"Love, Day After Tomorrow"	1999	Masashi Ohishi	First Cut; Mai Kuraki Best 151A: Love & Hope; Mai Kuraki Single Collection: Chance for You
"Stay by My Side"	2000	Masashi Ohishi	First Cut; Mai Kuraki Best 151A: Love & Hope; Mai Kuraki Single Collection: Chance for You
"Stay by My Side" (Dream on Version)	2000	Masashi Ohishi	First Cut
"Secret of My Heart"	2000	Masashi Ohishi	First Cut; Mai Kuraki Best 151A: Love & Hope; Mai Kuraki Single Collection: Chance for You
"Never Gonna Give You Up"	2000	Masashi Ohishi	First Cut; Mai Kuraki Single Collection: Chance for You
"Simply Wonderful" (Radio Edit)	2000	Masashi Ohishi	First Cut; Mai Kuraki Single Collection: Chance for You
"Reach for the Sky"	2000	—N/a	My Reflection; Mai Kuraki Best 151A: Love & Hope; Mai Kuraki Single Collection: Chance for You
"Tsumetai Umi"	2001	—N/a	My Reflection; Mai Kuraki Best 151A: Love & Hope; Mai Kuraki Single Collection: Chance for You
"Stand Up"	2001	—N/a	My Reflection; Mai Kuraki Best 151A: Love & Hope; Mai Kuraki Single Collection: Chance for You
"Always"	2001	—N/a	My Reflection; Mai Kuraki Best 151A: Love & Hope; Mai Kuraki Single Collection: Chance for You
"Can't Forget Your Love"	2001	—N/a	My Reflection; Mai Kuraki Single Collection: Chance for You
"Winter Bells"	2002	—N/a	My Reflection; Mai Kuraki Single Collection: Chance for You
"Feel Fine!"	2002	—N/a	My Reflection; Mai Kuraki Best 151A: Love & Hope; Mai Kuraki Single Collection: Chance for You
"Like a Star in the Night"	2002	—N/a	My Reflection; Mai Kuraki Single Collection: Chance for You
"Ride on Time"	2002	—N/a	—N/a
"Key to My Life"	2002	—N/a	—N/a
"Make My Day"	2002	—N/a	My Reflection; Mai Kuraki Single Collection: Chance for You
"Time After Time (Hana Mau Machi de)"	2003	—N/a	My Reflection; Mai Kuraki Single Collection: Chance for You
"Kiss"	2003	—N/a	My Reflection; Mai Kuraki Single Collection: Chance for You
"Kaze no La La La"	2003	—N/a	My Reflection; Mai Kuraki Single Collection: Chance for You
"If I Believe"	2003	—N/a	My Reflection
"Same"	2003	—N/a	My Reflection
"Tonight, I Feel Close to You" (with Stefanie Sun)	2003	—N/a	—N/a
"Ashita e Kakeru Hashi"	2004	—N/a	Mai Kuraki Best 151A: Love & Hope; Mai Kuraki Single Collection: Chance for You
"Love, Needing"	2005	—N/a	Mai Kuraki Single Collection: Chance for You
"Dancing"	2005	Nigel Dick	Making of Dancing; Mai Kuraki Single Collection: Chance for You
"P.S My Sunshine"	2005	—N/a	Mai Kuraki Single Collection: Chance for You
"I Sing a Song for You"	2005	—N/a	—N/a
"Growing of My Heart"	2005	—N/a	Mai Kuraki Single Collection: Chance for You
"Best of Hero"	2006	—N/a	Mai Kuraki Single Collection: Chance for You
"Diamond Wave"	2006	—N/a	Diamond Wave; Mai Kuraki Single Collection: Chance for You
"Diamond Wave" (iTunes Exclusive Version)	2006	—N/a	—N/a
"Shiroi Yuki"	2006	—N/a	Mai Kuraki Best 151A: Love & Hope; Mai Kuraki Single Collection: Chance for You
"Season of Love"	2007	—N/a	Mai Kuraki Best 151A: Love & Hope; Mai Kuraki Single Collection: Chance for You
"Silent Love (Open My Heart)"	2007	—N/a	Mai Kuraki Best 151A: Love & Hope; Mai Kuraki Single Collection: Chance for You
"Be with U"	2007	—N/a	Mai Kuraki Best 151A: Love & Hope; Mai Kuraki Single Collection: Chance for You
"One Life"	2008	—N/a	—N/a
"Yume ga Saku Haru"	2008	—N/a	Mai Kuraki Single Collection: Chance for You
"Ichibyōgoto ni Love for You"	2008	—N/a	Ichibyōgoto ni Love for You; Mai Kuraki Single Collection: Chance for You
"24 Xmas Time"	2008	—N/a	24 Xmas Time; Mai Kuraki Single Collection: Chance for You
"Touch Me!"	2009	—N/a	—N/a
"Puzzle"	2009	—N/a	Mai Kuraki Single Collection: Chance for You
"Revive"	2009	—N/a	Mai Kuraki Best 151A: Love & Hope; Mai Kuraki Single Collection: Chance for You
"Beautiful"	2009	—N/a	Beautiful; Mai Kuraki Single Collection: Chance for You
"Watashi no, Shiranai, Watashi."	2009	—N/a	Mai Kuraki Best 151A: Love & Hope
"Eien Yori Nagaku"	2010	—N/a	Eien Yori Nagaku/Drive me crazy Mai Kuraki Single Collection: Chance for You
"Drive Me Crazy"	2010	—N/a	Mai Kuraki Single Collection: Chance for You
"Summer Time Gone"	2010	—N/a	Mai Kuraki Single Collection: Chance for You
"1000 Mankai no Kiss"	2011	—N/a	Over the Rainbow; Mai Kuraki Single Collection: Chance for You
"Mou Ichido"	2011	—N/a	Over the Rainbow; Mai Kuraki Best 151A: Love & Hope; Mai Kuraki Single Collection: Chance for You
"Your Best Friend"	2011	—N/a	Your Best Friend; Over the Rainbow; Mai Kuraki Best 151A: Love & Hope; Mai Kuraki Single Collection: Chance for You
"Brave Your Heart" (with Alex Ru)	2012	—N/a	Over the Rainbow
"Stay the Same"	2012	—N/a	Over the Rainbow
"Koi ni Koishite"	2012	—N/a	Koi ni Koishite/Special Morning Day to You; Mai Kuraki Best 151A: Love & Hope; Mai Kuraki Single Collection: Chance for You
"Hakanasa"	2012	—N/a	Mai Kuraki Symphonic Collection in Moscow; Mai Kuraki Best 151A: Love & Hope; Mai Kuraki Single Collection: Chance for You
"Try Again"	2013	—N/a	Try Again; Mai Kuraki Best 151A: Love & Hope; Mai Kuraki Single Collection: Chance for You
"Wake Me Up"	2014	—N/a	Wake Me Up; Mai Kuraki Best 151A: Love & Hope; Mai Kuraki Single Collection: Chance for You
"Muteki na Heart"	2014	—N/a	Muteki na Heart; Mai Kuraki Best 151A: Love & Hope; Mai Kuraki Single Collection: Chance for You
"Stand by You"	2014	—N/a	Stand by You; Mai Kuraki Best 151A: Love & Hope; Mai Kuraki Single Collection: Chance for You
"Serendipity"	2015	—N/a	Mai Kuraki Single Collection: Chance for You
"Yesterday Love"	2017	Atsunori Toshi	Yesterday Love; Mai Kuraki Single Collection: Chance for You
"Togetsukyo (Kimi Omou)"	2017	Takeshi Ohno	Togetsukyo (Kimi Omou); Kimi Omou: Shunkashūtō; Mai Kuraki Single Collection: Chance for You
"Koyoi wa Yume wo Misasete"	—N/a	2018	Kimi Omou: Shunkashūtō; Mai Kuraki Single Collection: Chance for You
"Hanakotoba"	—N/a	2018	Kimi Omou: Shunkashūtō
"Kimi to Koi no Mama de Owarenai Itsumo Yume no Mama ja Irarenai"	—N/a	2019	Kimi to Koi no Mama de Owarenai Itsumo Yume no Mama ja Irarenai/Barairo no Jinsei; Mai Kuraki Single Collection: Chance for You
"Barairo no Jinsei"	—N/a	2019	Kimi to Koi no Mama de Owarenai Itsumo Yume no Mama ja Irarenai/Barairo no Jinsei; Mai Kuraki Single Collection: Chance for You
"Makenaide"	—N/a	2019	—N/a
"Zero kara Hajimete"	2021	Takeshi Ohno	Zero kara Hajimete

=== As featured artist ===
Title	Year	Director	Video album
"Imitation Gold" (Tak Matsumoto featuring Mai Kuraki)	2003	—N/a	—N/a
"My Story, Your Song" (Stefanie Sun featuring Mai Kuraki)	2003	—N/a	—N/a
"Sunao ni Ienakute" (Zard featuring Mai Kuraki)	2009	—N/a	Zard Music Video Collection: 25th Anniversary
"Doushite Suki nandaro?" (Nerdhead featuring Mai-K)	2011	Takuya Tada	Doushite Suki nandaro?
"Kotoba ni Dekinai Hodo Suki nanoni" (Nerdhead featuring Mai-K)	2011	Naokazu Mitsuishi	—N/a

== Video albums ==
List of media, with selected chart positions
Title	Album details	Peak positions			Certifications
Title	Album details	JPN DVD	JPN Blu-ray	TWN (Note: Positions were taken from 2006 week 8 for Mai Kuraki Live Tour 2005 Like a Fuse of Live and Tour Documentary of "Chance for You", 2007 week 34 for Brilliant Cut: Mai Kuraki Live & Document, 2009 week 18 for Mai Kuraki Live Tour 2008 "Touch Me!", 2009 week 52 for 10th Anniversary Mai Kuraki Live Tour "Best", 2011 week 44 for Happy Happy Halloween Live 2010, 2011 week 49 for Strong Heart: From Mai Kuraki Premium Live One for All, All for One, 2012 week 33 for Mai Kuraki Live Tour 2012: Over the Rainbow, 2013 week 51 for Mai Kuraki Symphonic Collection in Moscow, 2013 week 27 for Mai Kuraki Symphonic Live: Opus 1, and 2014 week 13 for Mai Kuraki Symphonic Live: Opus 2.)	Certifications
First Cut	Released: November 8, 2000; Label: Giza Studio; Format(s): DVD, VHS	1	—	—	
Mai Kuraki & Experience First Live 2001 in Zepp Osaka	Released: September 19, 2001; Label: B-Vision; Format(s): VHS	—	—	—	
Mai Kuraki & Experience First Live Tour 2001 Eternal Moment	Released: November 21, 2001; Label: B-Vision; Format(s): DVD, VHS	2	—	—	
Mai Kuraki "Loving You..." Tour 2002 Final 2.27 in Yokohama Arena	Released: April 3, 2002; Label: B-Vision; Format(s): VHS	—	—	—	
Mai Kuraki "Loving You..." Tour 2002 Complete Edition	Released: May 15, 2002; Label: B-Vision; Format(s): DVD	2	—	—	
My Reflection	Released: January 17, 2004; Label: B-Vision; Format(s): DVD	1	—	—	JPN: Gold
Mai Kuraki 5th Anniversary Edition Grow, Step by Step	Released: January 5, 2005; Label: B-Vision; Format(s): DVD	7	—	—	
Mai Kuraki Live Tour 2005 Like a Fuse of Live and Tour Documentary of "Chance for You"	Released: February 22, 2006; Label: B-Vision; Format(s): DVD	6	—	2	
Brilliant Cut: Mai Kuraki Live & Document	Released: August 22, 2007; Label: Northern Music; Format(s): DVD	6	—	4	
Mai Kuraki Live Tour 2008 "Touch Me!"	Released: May 6, 2009; Label: Northern Music; Format(s): DVD	4	—	3	
10th Anniversary Mai Kuraki Live Tour "Best"	Released: December 23, 2009; Label: Northern Music; Format(s): DVD	10	—	8	
Happy Happy Halloween Live 2010	Released: October 19, 2010; Label: Northern Music; Format(s): DVD	9	—	4	
Mai Kuraki Premium Live One for All, All for One	Released: March 14, 2012; Label: Northern Music; Format(s): DVD	9	—	5	
Mai Kuraki Live Tour 2012: Over the Rainbow	Released: August 15, 2012; Label: Northern Music; Format(s): DVD	6	—	3	
Mai Kuraki Symphonic Collection in Moscow	Released: December 19, 2012; Label: Northern Music; Format(s): DVD+CD, 2DVD+CD	15	—	3	
Mai Kuraki Symphonic Live: Opus 1	Released: July 3, 2013; Label: Northern Music; Format(s): DVD	14	—	5	
Mai Kuraki Live Project 2013 "Re:"	Released: December 4, 2013; Label: Northern Music; Format(s): DVD	10	—	—	
Mai Kuraki Symphonic Live: Opus 2	Released: March 26, 2014; Label: Northern Music; Format(s): DVD	34	—	3	
15th Anniversary Mai Kuraki Live Project 2014 BEST “151A” ～Premium～	Released: May 27, 2015; Label: Northern Music; Format(s): DVD, Blu-ray	4	30	—	
Mai Kuraki Symphonic Live: Opus 3	Released: January 27, 2016; Label: Northern Music; Format(s): DVD, Blu-ray	40	45	—	
Mai Kuraki Live Project 2017: Sawage Live	Released: August 16, 2017; Label: Northern Music; Format(s): DVD, Blu-ray	9	9	—	
Mai Kuraki Live Project 2018 "Red It be: Kimi Omou Shunkashūtō"	Released: November 27, 2019; Label: Northern Music; Format(s): DVD, Blu-ray	18	21	—	
20th Anniversary Mai Kuraki Live Project 2019 "Let's Goal!: Barairo no Jinsei"	Released: June 24, 2020; Label: Northern Music; Format(s): DVD, Blu-ray	12	17	—	
Mai Kuraki Live Project 2021 "Unconditional Love"	Released: December 8, 2022; Label: Northern Music; Format(s): DVD, Blu-ray	16	18	—	
Mai Kuraki Premium Symphonic Concert 2022	Released: November 15, 2023; Label: Northern Music; Format(s): DVD+CD, Blu-ray+CD	TBA			
"—" denotes items which were released before the creation of the G-Music chart, or items that did not chart.

== Video singles ==
List of media, with selected chart positions
Title	Album details	Peak positions			Sales
Title	Album details	JPN DVD	JPN Blu-ray	JPN Hot 100	Sales
Strong Heart	Released: November 23, 2011; Label: Northern Music; Format(s): DVD+CD, DVD+2CD	4	—	63	20,000
Wake Me Up	Released: February 26, 2014; Label: Northern Music; Format(s): DVD+CD	2	—	75	12,000
Yesterday Love	Released: February 26, 2014; Label: Northern Music; Format(s): Blu-ray, DVD, Blu-ray+DVD	3	6	— (Note: "Yesterday Love" did not enter the Billboard Japan Hot 100 Chart, but peaked at number 14 on the Billboard Japan Hot Animation Chart.)	6,100
Zero kara Hajimete	Released: June 2, 2021; Label: Northern Music; Format(s): DVD+CD	1	—	— (Note: "Zero kara Hajimete" did not enter the Billboard Japan Hot 100 Chart, but peaked at number 80 on the Billboard Japan Top Download Songs Chart.)	8,000

== Television roles ==
Year	Television show	Character	Description
2000-2002	Mai-K TV	Host	
2019	Case Closed	Herself (voice role)	"The Scarlet School Trip (Bright Red Arc)" "The Scarlet School Trip (Crimson Love Arc)" (Episode 927, 928)
2019	Fhit Music: Mai Kuraki	Herself	
2019	Non-fiction W: Mai Kuraki First Documentary	Herself	Documentary

== Commercials ==
Year	Companies	Brands/products
2001	Coca-Cola Japan	Sokenbicha
2002-2003	Shiseido	Sea Breeze
2005	Dwango	
2009	Being Giza Studio	
2009-2011	Kosé	Esprique Precious
2012	NGW Japan	Icefield
2015	West Japan Railway Company	San'yō Shinkansen 40th anniversary campaign
2016-2017	U-Can	Speak Master
2018-2019	Parco	Chinese New Year campaign
2018-2019	Kyoto	Travel campaign
2019-	Cleverlyhome	
