= Mai Kuraki Single Collection: Chance for You =

- Standard edition cover

Compilation album by Mai Kuraki
- Released: December 25, 2019
- Recorded: 1999–2019
- Genre: J-pop; R&B
- Length: 4:39:26
- Label: Northern Music
- Producer: Mai Kuraki (exec.); Daiko Nagato

Mai Kuraki chronology
Let's Goal!: Barairo no Jinsei (2019)	Mai Kuraki Single Collection: Chance for You (2019)	Unconditional Love (2021)

Singles from Mai Kuraki Single Collection: Chance for You
- 1. "Eien Yori Nagaku" Released: March 3, 2010

Mai Kuraki Single Collection: Chance for You is the fifth compilation album and first single collection by Japanese singer-songwriter Mai Kuraki. It was released on 25 December 2019 by Northern Music, in commemoration of Kuraki's 20th anniversary since her debut. The album features all the singles and some promotional singles Kuraki has released, since her debut "Love, Day After Tomorrow" (2000) to "Kimi to Koi no Mama de Owarenai Itsumo Yume no Mama ja Irarenai"/"Barairo no Jinsei" (2019). The four-disc single collection was mastered by the Grammy-nominated/winning engineers, Ryan Smith, Chris Gehringer, Randy Merrill, Joe LaPorta, and Ted Jensen.

== Release and promotion ==
=== Meet and greet tour ===
In support of the album, Kuraki embarked on the meet and greet tour.

Date	City	Country	Venue
December 24, 2019	Ikebukuro, Tokyo	Japan	Sunshine City, Tokyo
December 28, 2019	Funabashi, Chiba	Japan	LaLaport Tokyo-Bay
December 29, 2019	Hirakara, Osaka	Japan	Kuzuha Mall

== Charting performance ==
In Japan, the album debuted at number six on the Oricon Daily Albums Chart, becoming her weakest debut since One Life (2008). On the following day, it climbed to number three, selling 4,378 physical copies. Mai Kuraki Single Collection: Chance for You debuted at number six on the Oricon Weekly Albums Chart, selling 18,171 physical copies in its first week. In the following week, the album fell from number six to fifteen, with the sales of 3,023 copies.

== Track listing ==
Disc 1
No.	Title	Lyrics	Music	Arranger(s)	Length
1.	"Love, Day After Tomorrow"	Mai Kuraki	Aika Ohno	Cybersound
2.	"Stay by My Side"	Kuraki	Ohno	Cybersound
3.	"Secret of My Heart"	Kuraki	Ohno	Cybersound
4.	"Never Gonna Give You Up"	Kuraki; Michael Africk	Africk; Miguel Sá Pessoa; Perry Geyer	Cybersound
5.	"Simply Wonderful" (Radio Edit)	Kuraki	Ohno	Cybersound
6.	"Reach for the Sky"	Kuraki	Ohno	Cybersound
7.	"Tsumetai Umi" (冷たい海)	Kuraki	Ohno	Cybersound
8.	"Start in My Life"	Kuraki	Ohno	Cybersound
9.	"Stand Up"	Kuraki	Akihito Tokunaga	Tokunaga
10.	"Always"	Kuraki	Ohno	Cybersound
11.	"Can't Forget Your Love"	Kuraki	Ohno	Tokunaga; Cybersound
12.	"Perfect Crime" (Single Edit)	Kuraki	Tokunaga	Tokunaga; Daisuke Ikeda
13.	"Winter Bells"	Kuraki	Tokunaga	Tokunaga
14.	"Feel Fine!"	Kuraki	Tokunaga	Tokunaga
15.	"Like a Star in the Night"	Kuraki	Ohno	Tokunaga
16.	"Make My Day"	Kuraki	Tokunaga	Tokunaga

Disc 2
No.	Title	Lyrics	Music	Arranger(s)	Length
1.	"Time After Time (Hana Mau Machi de)" (Time after time ～花舞う街で～)	Kuraki	Aika Ohno	Cybersound
2.	"Kiss"	Kuraki	Yoko Blaqstone	Cybersound
3.	"Kaze no La La La" (風のららら)	Kuraki	Michiya Haruhata	Cybersound
4.	"Ashita e Kakeru Hashi" (明日へ架ける橋)	Kuraki	Akihito Tokunaga	Tokunaga; Daisuke Ikeda
5.	"Love, Needing"	Kuraki	Ohno	Hiroshi Asai
6.	"Dancing" (ダンシング)	Kuraki	Tokunaga	Tokunaga
7.	"P.S My Sunshine"	Kuraki	Hitoshi Okamoto	Okamoto
8.	"Growing of My Heart"	Kuraki	Ohno	Takeshi Hayama
9.	"Best of Hero" (ベスト オブ ヒーロー)	Kuraki	Tokunaga	Tokunaga
10.	"Diamond Wave"	Kuraki	Tokunaga	Tokunaga
11.	"Shiroi Yuki" (白い雪)	Kuraki	Ohno	Ikeda
12.	"Season of Love"	Kuraki	Ohno	Cybersound
13.	"Silent Love (Open My Heart)"	Kuraki	Daisuke Miyachi; Yuichi Ohno	Miyachi; Ohno
14.	"Be with U"	Kuraki	Tokunaga	Cybersound
15.	"Yume ga Saku Haru" (夢が咲く春)	Kuraki	Tokunaga	Tokunaga
16.	"You and Music and Dream"	Kuraki	Ohno	Cybersound

Disc 3
No.	Title	Lyrics	Music	Arranger(s)	Length
1.	"Ichibyōgoto ni Love for You" (一秒ごとに Love for you)	Kuraki	Aika Ohno	Cybersound
2.	"24 Xmas Time"	Kuraki	All the Rage	All the Rage; JJ; Carol H
3.	"Puzzle"	Kuraki	Yue Mochizuki; Takahiro Hiraga	Masazumi Ozawa
4.	"Revive"	Kuraki	Ohno	Miguel Sá Pessoa
5.	"Beautiful"	Kuraki	Song Yang Ha	Daisuke Ikeda
6.	"Eien Yori Nagaku" (永遠より ながく)	Kuraki	Kazuo Zaizu	Makoto Sasaki; Ken Harakawa
7.	"Drive Me Crazy"	Kuraki	Silver Stream	Silver Stream
8.	"Chance for You" (Cinema version)	Kuraki	Ohno	Yoshinobu Ohga
9.	"Summer Time Gone"	Kuraki	Ohno	Takeshi Hayama
10.	"1000 Mankai no Kiss" (1000万回のキス)	Kuraki	Ohno	Hayama
11.	"Anata ga Irukara" (あなたがいるから)	Kuraki; Mochizuki	Mochizuki	Akira Onozuka
12.	"Mō Ichido" (もう一度)	Kuraki	Jinichi Tajiri	Tajiri
13.	"Your Best Friend"	Kuraki; Giorgio 13	Giorgio Cancemi	Cancemi
14.	"Strong Heart"	Kuraki; Giorgio 13	Cancemi	Cancemi
15.	"Koi ni Koishite" (恋に恋して)	Kuraki; Giorgio 13	Cancemi	Cybersound
16.	"Special Morning Day to You"	Kuraki	Tokunaga	Tokunaga

Disc 4
No.	Title	Lyrics	Music	Arranger(s)	Length
1.	"Hakanasa" (儚さ)	Kuraki	Ikurō Fujiwara	Fujiwara
2.	"Try Again"	Kuraki	Akihito Tokunaga	Cybersound
3.	"Wake Me Up"	Kuraki	Tokunaga	Tokunaga
4.	"Muteki na Heart" (無敵なハート)	Kuraki	Takahiro Hiraga; Yue Mochizuki	Hirokazu Tajiri; Shun Sato
5.	"Stand by You"	Kuraki	Tokunaga	Tokunaga
6.	"Serendipity"	Kuraki	Tokunaga	Tokunaga
7.	"Sawage Life"	Kuraki	Alaina Beaton; Bobby Huff	Taito
8.	"Yesterday Love"	Kuraki	Daiko Nagato; Keiya Kubota	Yumeto Tsurusawa
9.	"Togetsukyo (Kimi Omou)" (渡月橋 ～君 想ふ～)	Kuraki	Tokunaga	Tokunaga
10.	"We Are Happy Women"	Kuraki	Ohno	Tokunaga
11.	"Do It!"	Kuraki	Tokunaga	Tokunaga
12.	"Light Up My Life"	Kuraki	Shilo	Shuho Mitani
13.	"Koyoi wa Yume wo Misasete" (今宵は夢を見させて)	Kuraki	Sairenji	Mine Kushita
14.	"Kimi to Koi no Mama de Owarenai Itsumo Yume no Mama ja Irarenai" (きみと恋のままで終われない いつも夢のままじゃいられない)	Kuraki	Daisuke Nakamura	Nakamura
15.	"Barairo no Jinsei" (薔薇色の人生)	Kuraki	Tokunaga	Tokunaga

Rainbow edition bonus track
No.	Title	Lyrics	Music	Arranger(s)	Length
16.	"Chance for You"	Kuraki	Ohno	Hiroshi Asai

Standard edition bonus track
No.	Title	Lyrics	Music	Length
16.	"Chance for You" (20th Anniversary version)	Kuraki	Ohno

Merci edition bonus disc
No.	Title	Lyrics	Music	Length
1.	"Chance for You" (Merci version)	Kuraki	Aika Ohno

Rainbow edition bonus DVD disc 1
No.	Title	Lyrics	Music	Arranger(s)	Length
1.	"Love, Day After Tomorrow"	Mai Kuraki	Aika Ohno	Cybersound
2.	"Stay by My Side"	Kuraki	Ohno	Cybersound
3.	"Secret of My Heart"	Kuraki	Ohno	Cybersound
4.	"Never Gonna Give You Up"	Kuraki; Michael Africk	Africk; Miguel Sá Pessoa; Perry Geyer	Cybersound
5.	"Simply Wonderful" (Radio Edit)	Kuraki	Ohno	Cybersound
6.	"Reach for the Sky"	Kuraki	Ohno	Cybersound
7.	"Tsumetai Umi" (冷たい海)	Kuraki	Ohno	Cybersound
8.	"Stand Up"	Kuraki	Akihito Tokunaga	Tokunaga
9.	"Always"	Kuraki	Ohno	Cybersound
10.	"Can't Forget Your Love" (Live version)	Kuraki	Ohno	Tokunaga; Cybersound
11.	"Winter Bells"	Kuraki	Tokunaga	Tokunaga
12.	"Feel Fine!"	Kuraki	Tokunaga	Tokunaga
13.	"Like a Star in the Night"	Kuraki	Ohno	Tokunaga
14.	"Make My Day"	Kuraki	Tokunaga	Tokunaga
15.	"Time After Time (Hana Mau Machi de)" (Time after time ～花舞う街で～)	Kuraki	Aika Ohno	Cybersound
16.	"Kiss"	Kuraki	Yoko Blaqstone	Cybersound
17.	"Kaze no La La La" (風のららら)	Kuraki	Michiya Haruhata	Cybersound
18.	"Ashita e Kakeru Hashi" (明日へ架ける橋)	Kuraki	Akihito Tokunaga	Tokunaga; Daisuke Ikeda
19.	"Love, Needing"	Kuraki	Ohno	Hiroshi Asai
20.	"Dancing" (ダンシング)	Kuraki	Tokunaga	Tokunaga
21.	"P.S My Sunshine"	Kuraki	Hitoshi Okamoto	Okamoto
22.	"Growing of My Heart"	Kuraki	Ohno	Takeshi Hayama
23.	"Best of Hero" (ベスト オブ ヒーロー)	Kuraki	Tokunaga	Tokunaga
24.	"Diamond Wave"	Kuraki	Tokunaga	Tokunaga
25.	"Shiroi Yuki" (白い雪)	Kuraki	Ohno
26.	Untitled			Ikeda

Rainbow edition bonus DVD disc 2
No.	Title	Lyrics	Music	Arranger(s)	Length
1.	"Season of Love"	Kuraki	Ohno	Cybersound
2.	"Silent Love (Open My Heart)"	Kuraki	Daisuke Miyachi; Yuichi Ohno	Miyachi; Ohno
3.	"Yume ga Saku Haru" (夢が咲く春)	Kuraki	Tokunaga	Tokunaga
4.	"Ichibyōgoto ni Love for You" (一秒ごとに Love for you)	Kuraki	Aika Ohno	Cybersound
5.	"24 Xmas Time"	Kuraki	All the Rage	All the Rage; JJ; Carol H
6.	"Puzzle"	Kuraki	Yue Mochizuki; Takahiro Hiraga	Masazumi Ozawa
7.	"Revive"	Kuraki	Ohno	Miguel Sá Pessoa
8.	"Beautiful"	Kuraki	Song Yang Ha	Daisuke Ikeda
9.	"Eien Yori Nagaku" (永遠より ながく)	Kuraki	Kazuo Zaizu	Makoto Sasaki; Ken Harakawa
10.	"Drive Me Crazy"	Kuraki	Silver Stream	Silver Stream
11.	"Summer Time Gone"	Kuraki	Ohno	Takeshi Hayama
12.	"1000 Mankai no Kiss" (1000万回のキス)	Kuraki	Ohno	Hayama
13.	Untitled (もう一度)	Kuraki	Jinichi Tajiri	Tajiri
14.	"Your Best Friend"	Kuraki; Giorgio 13	Giorgio Cancemi	Cancemi
15.	"Koi ni Koishite" (恋に恋して)	Kuraki; Giorgio 13	Cancemi	Cybersound
16.	"Hakanasa" (儚さ)	Kuraki	Ikuro Fujiwara	Fujiwara
17.	"Try Again"	Kuraki	Akihito Tokunaga	Cybersound
18.	"Wake Me Up"	Kuraki	Tokunaga	Tokunaga
19.	"Muteki na Heart" (無敵なハート)	Kuraki	Takahiro Hiraga; Yue Mochizuki	Hirokazu Tajiri; Shun Sato
20.	"Stand by You"	Kuraki	Tokunaga	Tokunaga
21.	"Serendipity"	Kuraki	Tokunaga	Tokunaga
22.	"Yesterday Love"	Kuraki	Daiko Nagato; Keiya Kubota	Yumeto Tsurusawa
23.	"Togetsukyo (Kimi Omou)" (渡月橋 ～君 想ふ～)	Kuraki	Tokunaga	Tokunaga
24.	"Koyoi wa Yume wo Misasete" (今宵は夢を見させて)	Kuraki	Sairenji	Mine Kushita
25.	"Kimi to Koi no Mama de Owarenai Itsumo Yume no Mama ja Irarenai" (きみと恋のままで終われない いつも夢のままじゃいられない)	Kuraki	Daisuke Nakamura	Nakamura
26.	"Barairo no Jinsei" (薔薇色の人生)	Kuraki	Tokunaga	Tokunaga

== Credits and personnel ==
Technical

- Ryan Smith - mastering (Disc 1)
- Ted Jensen - mastering (Disc 2)
- Chris Gehringer - mastering (Disc 3)
- Randy Merrill - mastering (Disc 4)
- Joe LaPorta - mastering (Bonus disc)

Design

- Shōmei Yoh - cover art (Rainbow edition)

== Charts ==
=== Daily charts ===
Chart (2019)	Peak position
Japanese Albums (Oricon)	3

=== Weekly charts ===
Chart (2020)	Peak position
Japanese Albums (Oricon)	6
Japanese Albums (Billboard Japan)	6

== Release history ==
Region	Date	Version	Format	Label	Catalog No.	Ref.
Various	December 25, 2019	Standard edition	4×CD	Northern Music	VNCM-9059～9062	
Various	December 25, 2019	Rainbow edition (limited)	4×CD+2×DVD	Northern Music	VNCM-9051～9054	
Various	December 25, 2019	Merci edition	5×CD	Northern Music	VNCM-9055～9058	
Various	December 25, 2019	FC & Musing edition	4×CD	Northern Music	VNCF-9012～9015	
Various	January 8, 2020		digital download	Northern Music		
