= Kimi Omou: Shunkashūtō =

- Standard edition cover

Studio album by Mai Kuraki
- Released: October 10, 2018
- Recorded: 2017–18
- Studio: Birdman West
- Genre: Pop
- Length: 32:58
- Label: Northern Music
- Producer: Mai Kuraki; Daiko Nagato

Mai Kuraki chronology
Mai Kuraki x Meitantei Conan Collaboration Best 21: Shinjitsu wa Itsumo Uta ni Aru! (2017)	Kimi Omou: Shunkashūtō (2018)	Let's Goal!: Barairo no Jinsei (2019)

Singles from Kimi Omou: Shunkashūtō
- 1. "Togetsukyō (Kimi Omofu)" Released: April 12, 2017; 2. "We Are Happy Women" Released: March 2, 2018; 3. "Do It!" Released: March 9, 2018; 4. "Light Up My Life" Released: March 16, 2018; 5. "Koyoi wa Yume wo Misasete" Released: August 8, 2018

Kimi Omou: Shunkashūtō (君想う 〜春夏秋冬〜) is the first concept album by the J-pop singer and songwriter Mai Kuraki. It was released on October 10, 2018, via Northern Music.

The album is a concept album about the four seasons in Japan and was released with six different versions, including four versions that represent each season: Spring, Summer, Autumn, and Winter. The album has spawned five singles, including the platinum-selling single "Togetsukyō (Kimi Omofu)". Kuraki embarked on the meet and greet tour Mai Kuraki Shunkashūtō Kai and the concert tour Mai Kuraki Live Project 2018 "Red It Be": Kimi Omou Shunkashūtō in support of the album.

== Singles ==
"Togetsukyō (Kimi Omofu)" was released as the lead single from the album on 12 April 2017. The song served as the theme song to the 2017 Japanese animated film Detective Conan: Crimson Love Letter. A gagaku-influenced J-pop song produced by her long-time collaborator Akihito Tokunaga, "Togetsukyo (Kimi Omofu)" had commercial and critical acclaim. The song debuted and peaked at number five on the Oricon Weekly Singles Chart, selling 29,846 physical copies in its first week. The following week, the song was released on digital format and peaked at number two on the Billboard Japan Hot 100. The song has sold over 76,000 physical copies and 250,000 digital copies and has been certificated Platinum by the Recording Industry Association of Japan. Consequently, the song became Kuraki's best-selling single since her 2004 single "Ashita e Kakeru Hashi". The song was also included on Kuraki's third compilation album Mai Kuraki x Meitantei Conan Collaboration Best 21: Shinjitsu wa Itsumo Uta ni Aru!.

As the first part of the weekly project, releasing a song every week on three consecutive weeks, "We Are Happy Women" was released as the second single on 2 March 2018. The feminist-empowerment song served as the campaign song for Happy Woman, an official project for protecting Japanese women's human rights, and managed to enter the Billboard Japan Top Download Songs chart, peaking at number ninety-three.

"Do It!" was released to several radio stations based in Nagoya with no announcements, and officially released as the third single on 9 March 2018. The uptempo rock song served as the official theme song for the annual marathon race for female runners, 2018 Nagoya Women's Marathon, and peaked at number seventy-four on the Billboard Japan Top Download Songs chart.

"Light Up My Life" was released on 16 March 2018, as the fourth single from the album and the last part of the weekly project. The song served as the theme song to the role-playing video game Valkyria Chronicles 4 and achieved better commercial success than the last two singles, peaking at number fifty-nine on the Billboard Japan Top Download Songs chart.

"Koyoi wa Yume wo Misasete" was released on 8 August 2018, as the fifth single. The gagaku-influenced dance-pop song served as the theme song to the anime television series Tsukumogami Kashimasu. A short version of the official music video for the song featuring a Japanese voice actress, Mikako Komatsu, who is known as a big fan of Kuraki and provided the voice of Okō in the anime, was released on YouTube on 7 August 2018.

=== Other songs ===
"Hanakotoba" served as the commercial song to the television manufactured by Mitsubishi Electric, Real 4K, the campaign song of Kyoto city government, and the theme song to the Japanese music television program, Buzzrhythm 2. An official music video for the song is included on the DVD, which is accompanied with the limited edition of the album. The video was taken in 4K resolution and premiered through Kuraki's official YouTube account on 7 September 2018.

"Be Proud: We Make New History" served as the campaign song to celebrate the 60th anniversary of the corporation, Nihon Unisys, Ltd. Kuraki has been the official ambassador of the company since April 2016.

== Promotion ==
To promote her singles and album as a whole, Mai has had promotional events in Totoyama, Yokohama, Hirakata and Funabashi districts, at different venues. The promotion lasted for a month, starting in early October of 2018 and ending in November of the same year. The shows were recorded for DVD sets and Blu-rays.

She performed some of her songs for the upcoming albums (with a setlist of 19 songs in total, with additional – encore – of 3 songs). During the promotioanal tour of Kimi Omou: Shunkashūtō, merchandise was given out to the fans, she also did autograph-singing, meet-and-greet and took pictures with the fans.

=== Tours ===
==== Mai Kuraki Shunkashūtō Kai: Meet and Greet and Merchandise ====
In support of the album, Kuraki embarked on the meet and greet tour entitled Mai Kuraki Shunkashūtō Kai, which began on 25 August 2018 in Toyoyama, Aichi and ended on 16 September 2018 in Funabashi, Chiba. At the tour, Kuraki sang several songs and went on to hand her merchandise, braid ribbon to the audiences. Fans were also allowed to do high-fives with her and given photographs of Kuraki, some of which were autographed by her.

Date	City	Country	Venue
Asia
25 August 2018	Toyoyama, Aichi	Japan	Airport Walk Nagoya
26 October 2018	Yokohama, Kanagawa	Japan	LaLaport Yokohama
15 September 2018	Hirakata, Osaka	Japan	Kuzuha Mall
16 September 2018	Funabashi, Chiba	Japan	LaLaport Tokyo-Bay

==== Mai Kuraki Live Project 2018 "Red It Be": Kimi Omou Shunkashūtō ====
Mai Kuraki Live Project 2018 "Red It Be": Kimi Omou Shunkashūtō
- National tour by Mai Kuraki
- Location: Japan
- Associated album: Kimi Omou: Shunkashūtō
- Start date: October 13, 2018
- End date: November 11, 2018
- Legs: 1
- No. of shows: 4

Mai Kuraki concert chronology
- Mai Kuraki Live Project 2017 "Sawage Live" (2017); Mai Kuraki Live Project 2018 "Red It Be": Kimi Omou Shunkashūtō (2018); 20th Anniversary Mai Kuraki Live Project 2019 "Let's Goal!: Barairo no Jinsei" (2019)

The concert tour, entitled Mai Kuraki Live Project 2018 "Red It Be": Kimi Omou Shunkashūtō began on 13 October 2018 in Narita, Chiba and ended on 11 November 2018 in Nagoya, Aichi to promote the album. All of the shows were recorded and released on a concert DVD/Blu-ray, Mai Kuraki Live Project 2018 "Red It be: Kimi Omou Shunkashūtō".

Date	City	Country	Venue
Asia
13 October 2018	Narita, Chiba	Japan	Narita International Cultural Center
28 October 2018	Osaka, Osaka	Japan	Osaka International Convention Center
1 November 2018	Tokyo	Japan	Tokyo International Forum
11 November 2018	Nagoya, Aichi	Japan	NTK Hall

===== Set list =====
The following set list is representative of the show in Chiba on October 13, 2018.

It is not representative of all concerts for the duration of the tour.

1. "Togetsukyō (Kimi Omofu)"
2. "Koyoi wa Yume wo Misasete"
3. "Yume ga Saku Haru"
4. "P.S My Sunshine"
5. "Reach for the Sky"
6. "Secret of My Heart"
7. "Mi Corazón"
8. "Light Up My Life"
9. "Don't Know Why" (Norah Jones cover)
10. "Be Proud: We Make New History"
11. "Makka na Kasa: Kyōto no Ame"
12. "Time After Time (Hana Mau Machi de)"
13. "Hanakotoba"
14. "We Are Happy Women"
15. "Be with U"
16. "Stand Up"
17. "Sawage Life"
18. "Wake Me Up"
19. "Do It!"

Encore

20. "Muteki na Heart"
21. "Love, Day After Tomorrow"
22. "Always"

== Commercial performance ==
The album debuted at number two on the Oricon Daily Albums chart, with the sales of 10,143 physical copies.

The album sold 20,551 copies in its first week and reached number three on the Oricon Weekly Albums chart.

== Track listing ==
Standard edition
No.	Title	Writer(s)	Length
1.	"Light Up My Life"	Mai Kuraki; shilo; Shuho Mitani	4:24
2.	"Be Proud" (We Make New History)	Kuraki; Daisuke Nakamura	4:30
3.	"Hanakotoba (花言葉, Language of Flowers)"	Kuraki; Aika Ohno; Yumeto Tsurusawa; Daisuke Ikeda	4:25
4.	"We Are Happy Women"	Kuraki; Aika Ohno; Akihito Tokunaga	4:10
5.	"Do It!"	Kuraki; Tokunaga	3:52
6.	"Makka na Kasa: Kyōto no Ame (真っ赤な傘 ～京都の雨～, Red Umbrella: Rain in Kyoto)"	Kuraki; Hiroki Sagawa	3:32
7.	"Koyoi wa Yume wo Misasete (今宵は夢を見させて, Let Me Dream a Dream)"	Kuraki; Sairenji; Mine Kushita	4:02
8.	"Togetsukyō (Kimi Omofu) (渡月橋 ～君 想ふ～, Togetsukyo: Thinking of You)"	Kuraki; Tokunaga	4:06

Limited edition bonus DVD
No.	Title	Writer(s)	Length
1.	"Hanakotoba (花言葉, Language of Flowers)" (Music video)
2.	"Koyoi wa Yume wo Misasete (今宵は夢を見させて, Let Me Dream a Dream)" (Music video)	Kuraki; Sairenji; Mine Kushita
3.	"Togetsukyō (Kimi Omofu) (渡月橋 ～君 想ふ～, Togetsukyo: Thinking of You)" (Music video)	Kuraki; Tokunaga

== Personnel ==
- Mai Kuraki – vocals, backing vocals, producer
- Koichiro Muroya – violin (track 1)
- Takayuki Yoshimura – piano (track 1)
- Naoki Kobayashi – bass (track 1)
- Aika Ohno – backing vocals (track 3, 4)
- Akihito Tokunaga – backing vocals, electric guitar, synths (track 5)
- Shun Sato – director
- Tokiko T Nishimuro – chief director
- Takayuki Ichikawa – mixer, recording engineer
- Takeshi Takizawa – mixer
- Hidemi Arai – art designer
- Tetsuo Sato – art director, designer
- Sunao Ohmori – photographer
- Hitoko Goto – stylist
- Keizo Kuroda – hair and makeup artist
- Kaoru Chujo – visual director
- Asumi Narita – creative coordinator
- Miho Saito – A&R
- Asako Watanabe – artist manager
- Manami Yoshita – artist manager
- Toshinori Masuda – supervisor
- Kanonji – executive producer

== Charts ==
=== Daily charts ===
Chart (2018)	Peak position
Japanese Albums (Oricon)	2

=== Weekly charts ===
Chart (2018)	Peak position
Japanese Albums (Oricon)	3
Japanese Albums (Billboard)	4
Japan Top Albums Sales (Billboard)	4
Japan Download Albums (Billboard)	34

=== Monthly charts ===
Chart (2018)	Peak position
Japanese Albums (Oricon)	11

== Release history ==
Region	Date	Format	Label	Ref.
Japan	October 10, 2018	CD (Standard edition)	Northern Music	
Japan	October 10, 2018	CD/DVD (Limited edition: Spring)	Northern Music	
Japan	October 10, 2018	CD/DVD (Limited edition: Summer)	Northern Music	
Japan	October 10, 2018	CD/DVD (Limited edition: Autumn)	Northern Music	
Japan	October 10, 2018	CD/DVD (Limited edition: Winter)	Northern Music	
Japan	October 10, 2018	CD (Musing & FC edition)	Northern Music	
Japan	October 17, 2018	Digital download	Being Inc.	
Taiwan	October 26, 2018	CD/DVD (Limited edition: Autumn)	Forward Music	
Taiwan	October 26, 2018	Streaming	Forward Music	
Taiwan	October 26, 2018	Digital download	Forward Music	
South Korea	November 8, 2018	CD	C&L Music	
South Korea	November 8, 2018	Digital download	C&L Music	
