= Mai Kuraki Symphonic Collection in Moscow =

Compilation album by Mai Kuraki
- Released: December 19, 2012
- Recorded: 2012
- Studio: Mir Theatre (Moscow, Russia)
- Genre: Classical pop
- Length: Disc 1: 7:09; Disc 2: 65:00
- Label: Northern Music
- Producer: Mai Kuraki (Executive producer), Daiko Nagato

Mai Kuraki chronology
Over the Rainbow (2012)	Mai Kuraki Symphonic Collection in Moscow (2012)	Mai Kuraki Best 151A: Love & Hope (2014)

Mai Kuraki Symphonic Collection in Moscow is the first self-cover and orchestral album released by the Japanese singer Mai Kuraki. It was released on 19 December 2012 on the Northern Music label. Though from the official website, it is considered as a music video album.

== Background ==
The track list consist of Mai Kuraki's hit collection orchestrally re-arranged by Ikurō Fujiwara. Upon its release, success in both charting performance and popularity among the fans, she continues holding special orchestral live performances in years 2012, 2014, 2015, 2022 and 2023 and received live-video album released as well.

== Production ==
The album consist of 2 discs in regular edition and 3 discs in the limited edition of release. Disc one includes music videoclip of originally new written song for the album, "Hakanasa", composed by Fujiwara. Disc two includes recordings accompanied by Moscow Symphonic Orchestra and Tokyo Philharmonic Orchestra. The third disc from the limited edition of release includes documentary footage of making and recording of the album.

The song "Hakanasa" originally composed in 2008 and performed in under the Chinese title "Huà Xīn" (画心) by Jane Zhang, served as a theme song to the movie Painted Skin released in the same year. The lyrics for the Japanese version has been rewritten by Kuraki herself. "Hakanasa" has been later included in the 2014 compilation album Mai Kuraki Best 151A: Love & Hope and in 2019 compilation album Mai Kuraki Single Collection: Chance for You.

== Chart performance ==
The album reached at number 15 on the Oricon Weekly Albums Chart charting for five consecutive weeks.

== Track listing ==
Note: The information of the track list are taken from the artist's official website.

=== Disc one (DVD) ===
All lyrics are written by Mai Kuraki.

No.	Title	Music	Length
1.	"Hakanasa" (music video)	Fujiwara	7:09

=== Disc two (CD) ===
All tracks are orchestrally arranged by Fujiwara.

All lyrics are written by Mai Kuraki.

No.	Title	Music	Length
1.	"Hakanasa" (new song)	Ikurō Fujiwara	6:33
2.	"Time After Time" (15th single)	Aika Ohno	5:20
3.	"Secret of My Heart" (3rd single)	Ohno	4:49
4.	"Touch Me!" (from album Touch Me!)	Yue Mochizuki	6:04
5.	"always" (9th single)	Ohno	4:07
6.	"Tsumetai Umi" (7th single)	Ohno	5:26
7.	"Watashi no, Shiranai, Watashi." (わたしの、しらない、わたし。, from best album All my best)	Mochizuki	4:41
8.	"Can't Forget Your Love" (12th single)	Ohno	6:13
9.	"Love, Day After Tomorrow" (debut single)	Ohno	5:05
10.	"Stand Up" (8th)	Tokunaga	5:07
11.	"Chance for you" (from album Fuse of Love)	Ohno	4:21
12.	"always" (9th single)	Ohno	5:16
Total length:			65:00

== Release history ==
Year	Format(s)	Serial number	Label(s)	Ref.
2012	CD+DVD, CD+2DVD+photobook, digital download	VNZM-1001; VNZM-1002	Northern Music	
2023	streaming	-	Northern Music	
