= You Light Up My Life =

You Light Up My Life may refer to:

- "You Light Up My Life", a song by Carole King from her 1973 album Fantasy
- You Light Up My Life (film), a 1977 romantic drama
  - You Light Up My Life (soundtrack), soundtrack album to the 1977 film
  - "You Light Up My Life" (song), title song from the 1977 film, later covered by various artists
- You Light Up My Life (Debby Boone album), 1977
- You Light Up My Life (Johnny Mathis album), 1978
- You Light Up My Life: Inspirational Songs, a 1997 album by LeAnn Rimes

== See also ==
- "Light Up My Life", a 2018 song by Mai Kuraki
- "Someone to Light Up My Life", a 1956 song by Antonio Carlos Jobim
