= Doushite Suki Nandarou =

2011 song by Nerdhead

- Standard edition cover

Single by Nerdhead featuring Mai K

from the album Behind the Truth
- Released: June 1, 2011
- Genre: J-pop
- Length: 5:55
- Label: Universal
- Songwriter: Giorgio Cancemi
- Producer: Giorgio Cancemi

Nerdhead singles chronology
"Brave Heart" (2010)	"Doushite Suki Nandarou" (2011)	"My Girl" (2012)

Mai Kuraki singles chronology
"Mō Ichido" (2011)	"Doushite Suki Nandaro" (2011)	"Your Best Friend" (2011)

Music video
- "Doushite Suki Nandarou" on YouTube

"Doushite Suki Nandarou" (Japanese: どうして好きなんだろう) is a song recorded by Japanese rapper and record producer Nerdhead, featuring Japanese singer songwriter Mai Kuraki under the moniker Mai K. It was written and produced by Nerdhead himself. The song was released by Universal Music Japan on June 1, 2011, as the lead single from Nerdhead's second album Behind the Truth (2011). The ringtone of the song was released on April 29, 2011, ahead of its official release. "Doushite Suki Nandarou" is a middle-tempo ballad song with influences of R&B music and hip-hop.

The song debuted at number fifteen on the Oricon Weekly Singles Chart, selling 6,033 physical copies in its first week on sale, making it the first top 20 single for Nerdhead. The song also peaked at number seven on the RIAJ Digital Track Chart.

== Commercial performance ==
"Doushite Suki Nandarou" debuted and peaked on the Oricon Weekly Singles Chart at number fifteen, making it the first top 20 single for Nerdhead. The single charted for five weeks on the chart and has sold over 8,764 physical copies. On the Billboard Japan Hot 100 chart, the song achieved minor success, debuting at number 65. "Doushite Suki Nandarou" achieved more commercial success in its download sales, peaking at number seven on the RIAJ Digital Track Chart.

== Music video ==
The Run 60 version of the music video, which features the elements of the film of the same title, was released on May 11, 2011, approximately a month prior to the release of the song and its official music video. On May 24, 2011, the short version of the official music video was released before its official music video was released on June 10, 2011. As of March 2022, the three music videos have over 1.9 million views in total on YouTube. The official music video features the three Japanese fashion models: Mitsuki Oishi, Kayo Satoh and Arisa Nishida, as well as the artists themselves. The video was included in the limited edition bonus DVD.

== Live performances ==
"Doushite Suki Nandarou" was first performed by Nerdhead and Kuraki at the Girls Award by Crooz Blog 2011 Spring/Summer on April 29, 2011, which was held at the Yoyogi National Gymnasium. They later performed the song on the TV show Music Station on May 27, 2011. On October 22, 2011, Nerdhead and Kuraki performed "Doushite Suki Nandarou" at the Mai Kuraki Premium Live One for All, All for One, at the Nippon Budokan. Later, Nerdhead made a guest appearance on the last show of Kuraki's Mai Kuraki Live Tour 2012: Over the Rainbow, which was held at the Tokyo International Forum on March 24, 2012, and performed the song with Kuraki.

== Media usage ==
"Doushite Suki Nandarou" served as one of the five image songs for the Japanese film Run 60 (2011), others being "Masterpiece" by Mihimaru GT, "Without You" by Thelma Aoyama and 4Minute, "Kuriunnare -Kimi ni Aitakute-" by Supernova, and "Koi no Fushigi" by Cherie. The song was later used as the theme song to the Japanese television program Japan 47ch.

== Track listing ==
CD single
No.	Title	Writer(s)	Arranger(s)	Length
1.	"Doushite Suki Nandarou" (featuring Mai K)	Giorgio Cancemi	Cancemi	5:55
2.	"Life Is Beautiful"	Cancemi	Cancemi	4:54
3.	"Doushite Suki Nandarou" (featuring Mai K) (Instrumental)	Cancemi	Cancemi	5:55
4.	"Life Is Beautiful" (Instrumental)	Cancemi	Cancemi	4:49

Limited edition bonus DVD
No.	Title	Length
1.	"Doushite Suki Nandarou" (featuring Mai K) (Music video)

== Charts ==
Chart (2011)	Peak position
Japan (Oricon)	15
Japan (Japan Hot 100)	65
Japan Download (RIAJ Digital Track Chart)	7

== Certification and sales ==
Region	Certification	Certified units/sales
Japan (RIAJ)		8,764 (physical sales)

== Release history ==
Region	Date	Format	Label	Ref.
Japan	April 29, 2011	Ringtone	Universal	
Japan	June 1, 2011	CD (Standard edition)	Universal	
Japan	June 1, 2011	CD/DVD (Limited edition)	Universal	
Japan	June 1, 2011	Digital download	Universal	
