= Cool City Production Vol. 4 "Mai-K" Feel Fine! =

Remix album by Mai Kuraki and Cool City Production
- Released: October 23, 2002
- Recorded: 2001–2002
- Genres: J-pop; electronic
- Label: Tent House
- Producers: Michiaki Satate; DJ Me-Ya; M-oZ; Tech Riders; Dune; Bootee

Mai Kuraki albums chronology
| Secret of My Heart (2002) | Cool City Production Vol. 4 "Mai-K" Feel Fine! (2002) | If I Believe (2003) |

Cool City Production albums chronology
| Cool City Production Vol. 3 "Mai-K's Club Side" (2002) | Cool City Production Vol.4 Mai-K "Feel fine!" Remixes (2002) | Rina Aiuchi Remixes Cool City Production vol.5 (2003) |

Cool City Production Vol. 4 "Mai-K" Feel Fine!" is a remix album by Japanese singer and songwriter Mai Kuraki and Japanese production team Cool City Production. It was released on November 23, 2002, by Tent House. The album contains five different remixes of her song "Feel Fine!".

== Track listing ==
| No. | Title | Writer(s) | Remixer(s) | Length |
|---|---|---|---|---|
| 1. | "Feel Fine!" (DJ Me-Ya's Strong Passion Mix) | Mai Kuraki; Akihito Tokunaga | DJ Me-Ya | 4:00 |
| 2. | "Feel Fine!" (M-oZ Club Mix) | Kuraki; Tokunaga | M-oZ | 8:29 |
| 3. | "Feel Fine!" (Tech Riders Mix) | Kuraki; Tokunaga | Tech Riders | 7:52 |
| 4. | "Feel Fine!" (Dune Mix) | Kuraki; Tokunaga | Dune | 5:17 |
| 5. | "Feel Fine!" (Bootee's Club Mix) | Kuraki; Tokunaga | Bootee | 8:28 |

Enhanced video
| No. | Title | Writer(s) | Remixer(s) | Length |
|---|---|---|---|---|
| 6. | "Feel Fine!" (DJ Me-Ya's Strong Passion Mix) | Kuraki; Tokunaga | DJ Me-Ya | 14:35 |

== Release history ==
| Country | Date | Label | Ref. |
|---|---|---|---|
| Japan | November 23, 2002 | Tent House | |
