= We Are Happy Women =

Promotional single by Mai Kuraki

from the album Kimi Omou: Shunkashūtō
- Released: March 2, 2018
- Genre: J-pop; pop
- Length: 4:07
- Label: Northern Music
- Songwriter(s): Mai Kuraki; Aika Ohno
- Producer(s): Mai Kuraki; KANNONJI

Mai Kuraki promotional singles chronology
"Sawage Life" (2016)	"We Are Happy Women" (2018)	"Do It!" (2018)

Music video
- "Official trailer" on YouTube

"We Are Happy Women" is a song recorded by Japanese singer-songwriter Mai Kuraki, taken from her twelfth studio album Kimi Omou: Shunkashūtō (2018). It was released on March 2, 2018, by Northern Music and served as the campaign song for Happy Woman, an official project for protecting Japanese women's human rights.

== Live performance ==
On March 4, 2018, Kuraki performed "We Are Happy Women" in an event, Happy Woman Ceremony which was held at Yebisu Garden Place in Tokyo.

== Track listing ==
No.	Title	Writer(s)	Arranger(s)	Length
1.	"We Are Happy Women"	Mai Kuraki; Aika Ohno	Akihito Tokunaga	4:07

== Charts ==
Chart (2018)	Peak position
Japan (Billboard Japan Top Download Songs)	93
Japan RecoChoku (RecoChoku Weekly Singles)	42
Japan mora (mora Weekly Singles)	19
Japan Dwango (Dwango Weekly Singles)	87
Japan music.jp (music.jp Weekly Singles)	55

== Release history ==
Region	Date	Format	Label	Ref.
Japan	March 2, 2018	Digital download	Northern Music	
