= Dancing (Mai Kuraki song) =

Single by Mai Kuraki

from the album Fuse of Love
- B-side: "Through the River" "You Look at Me~One"
- Released: March 23, 2005
- Genre: J-pop
- Length: 3:47
- Label: Giza Studio
- Songwriter(s): Mai Kuraki; Akihito Tokunaga
- Producer(s): Mai Kuraki

Mai Kuraki singles chronology
"Love, Needing" (2005)	"Dancing" (2005)	"P.S My Sunshine" (2005)

"Dancing" ("ダンシング") is a song by Japanese singer-songwriter Mai Kuraki from her fifth studio album, Fuse of Love (2005). The song was written by Kuraki and her long-time collaborator, Akihito Tokunaga, and produced by Kuraki herself. The song served as Dwango's television commercial song. The single was released on 23 March 2005 through Giza Studio as the third single from Fuse of Love.

"Dancing" is a J-pop track with a pop rock and teen pop element, arranged by its composer, Akihito Tokunaga The single entered at number five on the Oricon Weekly Singles Chart. It became Kuraki's 20th consecutive top 10 single since her debut single, "Love, Day After Tomorrow" (1999). "Dancing" has been certified gold by the Recording Industry Association of Japan with more than 100,000 physical copies shipped.

The accompanying music video was directed by Nigel Dick and later released as a video single, "Making of Dancing: Diary of Los Angeles" (2005), exclusively on her official fan club store. The video was shot in Los Angeles, the United States. The single's B-side track, "You Look at Me~One" was used as the theme song to the Japanese sports news program Sports Urugus from April 2005 to June 2005.

== Commercial performance ==
In Japan, "Heart Beat" debuted at number five on the Oricon Weekly Singles Chart. It stayed on the chart for seven weeks, selling 56,682 copies in total. The single was later certified gold by the Recording Industry Association of Japan (RIAJ) for the shipment of more than 100,000 physical copies nationwide. The single was Kuraki's last single to be certified by RIAJ, until "Togetsukyo (Kimi Omou)" (2017) was certified platinum in September 2017.

== Track listing ==
CD single
No.	Title	Writer(s)	Arranger(s)	Length
1.	"Dancing" (ダンシング)	Mai Kuraki; Akihito Tokunaga	Tokunaga	3:47
2.	"Through the River"	Kuraki; Aika Ohno	Cybersound	3:47
3.	"You Look at Me~One"	Kuraki; Yoshinobu Ohga	Ohga	3:58
Total length:				11:32

== Charts ==
=== Daily charts ===
Chart (2005)	Peak position
Japan (Oricon)	2

=== Weekly charts ===
Chart (2005)	Peak position
Japan (Oricon)	5

=== Monthly charts ===
Chart (2005)	Peak position
Japan (Oricon)	12

== Certification and sales ==
Region	Certification	Certified units/sales
Japan (RIAJ)	Gold	56,682 (CD)

== Release history ==
Region	Date	Format	Catalogue Num.	Label	Ref.
Japan	23 March 2005	CD single	GZCA-4036	Giza Studio	
Taiwan	23 March 2005	CD single	SBCS-5004	Shinkong-Being Multimedia	
