= Do It! (song) =

Promotional single by Mai Kuraki

from the album Kimi Omou: Shunkashūtō
- Released: March 9, 2018
- Recorded: 2018
- Genre: J-pop
- Length: 3:51
- Label: Northern Music
- Songwriters: Mai Kuraki; Akihito Tokunaga
- Producers: Mai Kuraki; KANNONJI

Mai Kuraki promotional singles chronology
| "We Are Happy Women" (2018) | "Do It!" (2018) | "Light Up My Life" (2018) |

Music video
- "Official trailer" on YouTube

"Do It!" is a Japanese-language song recorded by Japanese singer songwriter Mai Kuraki, taken from her twelfth studio album Kimi Omou: Shunkashūtō (2018).. It was released on March 9, 2018, by Northern Music and served as the official fight song for 2018 Nagoya Women's Marathon, which was held on March 11, 2018. It was written by Kuraki and her long-time collaborator, Akihito Tokunaga.

== Background ==
On February 27, 2018, Kuraki announced that she would release three singles "We Are Happy Women", "Do It!" and "Light Up My Life" respectively on three consecutive weeks.

On March 1, 2018, "Do It!" was unexpectedly released to some radio stations like ZIP-FM and Radio NEO with no announcements. These radio stations are based in Nagoya, where 2018 Nagoya Women's Marathon would take place.

On the day of the release of "We Are Happy Women", the official trailer for these three songs were uploaded on YouTube.

== Live performance ==
On March 11, 2018, Kuraki performed "Do It!" at the 2018 Nagoya Women's Marathon, which was held in Nagoya Dome.

== Track listing ==
| No. | Title | Writer(s) | Arranger(s) | Length |
|---|---|---|---|---|
| 1. | "Do It!" | Mai Kuraki; Akihito Tokunaga | Tokunaga | 3:51 |
| Total length: | | | | 3:51 |

== Charts ==
=== Daily charts ===
| Chart (2018) | Peak position |
|---|---|
| Japan RecoChoku (RecoChoku Daily Singles) | 6 |
| Japan mora (mora Daily Singles) | 4 |
| Japan Dwango (Dwango Daily Singles) | 38 |
| Japan music.jp (music.jp Daily Singles) | 15 |

=== Weekly charts ===
| Chart (2018) | Peak position |
|---|---|
| Japan (Billboard Japan Top Download Songs) | 74 |
| Japan RecoChoku (RecoChoku Weekly Singles) | 24 |
| Japan mora (mora Weekly Singles) | 14 |
| Japan music.jp (music.jp Weekly Singles) | 34 |

== Release history ==
| Region | Date | Format | Label | Ref. |
|---|---|---|---|---|
| Japan | March 9, 2018 | Digital download | Northern Music | |
