= Over the Rainbow (Mai Kuraki album) =

Studio album by Mai Kuraki
- Released: January 11, 2012
- Recorded: 2011–12
- Genre: J-pop; R&B; synth-pop; funk; soul; electronica
- Length: 55:44
- Label: Northern Music
- Producer: Mai Kuraki; Daiko Nagato

Mai Kuraki chronology
Future Kiss (2010)	Over the Rainbow (2012)	Mai Kuraki Symphonic Collection in Moscow (2012)

Singles from Over the Rainbow
- 1. "1000 Mankai no Kiss" Released: March 9, 2011; 2. "Mou Ichido" Released: May 25, 2011; 3. "Your Best Friend" Released: October 19, 2011; 4. "Strong Heart" Released: November 23, 2011

Over the Rainbow (stylized in all caps) is the tenth studio album by Japanese singer and songwriter Mai Kuraki. It was released on January 11, 2012, by Northern Music. Some of the songs on Over the Rainbow are themed about the 2011 Tōhoku earthquake and tsunami, from which Kuraki has continuously contributed to the reconstruction in several ways.

In Japan, the album debuted at number two on the Oricon Weekly Albums chart, selling 29,618 copies in its first week, and spent 11 weeks on the chart. In Taiwan, Over the Rainbow debuted at number fourteen on the G-Music chart. As of October 2018, it is estimated that the album has sold 49,998 copies in Japan alone.

The first single from Over the Rainbow, "1000 Mankai no Kiss" was released in March 2011, the song peaked at number four on the Oricon Weekly Singles chart, and successfully reached number fourteen in Taiwan. The follow-up single, "Mō Ichido" achieved a moderate success, reaching number seven in Japan. The third single from the album, "Your Best Friend" was released in October 2011 and served as the theme song to the Japanese animated television series Case Closed. The fourth single "Strong Heart" was released on DVD single format. The song themed about female empowerment served as the theme song to the Japanese television series Hunter. The part of profits gained from the release of the single was donated to support the reconstruction from the 2011 Tōhoku earthquake and tsunami. To support the album, she embarked on the concert tour Mai Kuraki Live Tour 2012: Over the Rainbow from January 21, 2012.

== Release and promotion ==
=== Singles ===
"1000 Mankai no Kiss" was released as the lead single from the album in March 2011. A J-pop ballad song written by Kuraki herself and Aika Ohno, "1000 Mankai no Kiss" served as the television commercial song to Kosé's Esprique Precious brand. The song peaked at number four on the Oricon Weekly Singles chart, and successfully reached number fourteen in Taiwan. "1000 Mankai no Kiss" has sold 25,013 copies in Japan alone.

"Mō Ichido" was released in May 2011 as the second single from the album. The song served as the Japanese television drama series Kiri ni Sumu Akuma and peaked at number seven in Japan. As of October 2018, the song has sold 23,430 copies in Japan.

The third single from the album, "Your Best Friend" was released in October 2011. The song served as the theme song to the Japanese animated television series Case Closed and reached number six in Japan. The song has sold 25,247 copies in Japan alone, becoming the best-selling song on the album.

The fourth single "Strong Heart" was released on DVD single format. The song themed about female empowerment served as the theme song to the Japanese television series Hunter. The part of profits gained from the release of the single was donated to support the reconstruction from the 2011 Tōhoku earthquake and tsunami.

=== Other songs ===
"Sayonara wa Madaiwanai de" was released in March 2011, as the B-side track of "1000 Mankai no Kiss". The song was rearranged for the album. "Step by Step" and was released as the B-side track of "Your Best Friend" in October 2011. The song served as the television commercial song to Nemu Resort in Mie "Stay the Same" served as the Sanrio's image song for Wish Me Mell, where the new character, Maimai was named after Kuraki. "Brave Your Heart", which features a Chinese actor Alex Ru served as the theme song to the Japanese drama movie Ashita ni Kakeru Hashi.

== Critical reception ==
Professional ratings
Review scores
Source	Rating
Amazon Japan	(link)
EmbraceYou	(link)
FM 139.7	(link)
HMV Japan	(link)
MSN Music Japan	Positive (link)
Oricon	75 of 100 (link)
Rakuten	(link)
Yahoo! Japan	(link)

The album received positive critical reception from different sites. EmbraceYou, a web magazine (webzine) based in New York City, stated that "every track (in this album) sells in its own unique way." FM 139.7, a blogsite dedicated to East Asian pop culture, described Over the Rainbow as "the final stage of Kuraki's evolution from R&B to J-pop, while maintaining some of her earlier youthful R&B momentum."

== Track listing ==
All lyrics are written by Mai Kuraki, except track 1, 5, 8, 10 (Kuraki/Giorgio Cancemi) and track 9 (Kuraki/Michael Africk).

CD
No.	Title	Lyrics	Music	Arranger(s)	Length
1.	"Strong Heart" (first DVD and 38th overall single/theme song for the 2011 Kansai TV/Fuji TV Japanese drama HUNTER ~Sono Onna-tachi, Shoukin Kasegi~)	Mai Kuraki, Giorgio Cancemi	Cancemi	Cancemi	4:20
2.	"Another Day*Another World"		Aika Ohno	Masazumi Ozawa	3:56
3.	"Sayonara wa Madaiwanai de (Album Edition)" (B-side of 1000 Mankai no Kiss)		Footbread	Footbread, Park Sang-hyun (guitar)	4:35
4.	"Stay the Same" (Sanrio's image song for Wish Me Mell)		Cancemi	Cancemi	5:12
5.	"Your Best Friend" (37th single/ending theme for the 20th season of the Yomiuri TV/Nippon Television animation Case Closed)	Kuraki, Cancemi	Cancemi	Cancemi	5:52
6.	"Mou Ichido" (36th single/theme song of the 2011 Tokai TV/Fuji TV Japanese drama Devil in the Mist)		Hirokazu Tajiri	Tajiri	4:00
7.	"Brave Your Heart (featuring Alex Ru)" (theme song for the 2012 movie The Love Leading to Tomorrow)		Akihito Tokunaga	Tokunaga	4:58
8.	"Sun Will Shine on U" (theme song of TV Kanazawa's となりのテレ金ちゃん)	Kuraki, Cancemi	Cancemi	Cancemi	4:20
9.	"Love One Another (with Michael Africk)" (digital single for the benefit of the 2011 Tōhoku earthquake and tsunami victims)	Kuraki, Michael Africk	Africk	Africk, Miguel Sá Pessoa, Perry Geyer	3:58
10.	"Step by Step" (B-side of Your Best Friend/official image song of the Nemu no Sato Hotel and Resort, Mie Prefecture)	Kuraki, Cancemi	Cancemi	Cancemi	4:58
11.	"1000 Mankai no Kiss" (35th single/official image song of Kosé Corporation's Esprique Precious make-up line)		Ohno	Takeshi Hayama	5:03
12.	"La La La * La"		Tokunaga	Tokunaga	4:29

Bonus DVD
No.	Title	Length
1.	"1000 Mankai no Kiss" (Music video)	5:03
2.	"Mou Ichido" (Music video)	4:00
3.	"Your Best Friend" (Music video)	5:52
4.	"Brave Your Heart" (Music video)	4:58
5.	"Stay the Same" (Music video)	5:12

== Charts ==
=== Daily charts ===
Chart (2012)	Peak position
Japanese Albums (Oricon)	2

=== Weekly charts ===
Chart (2012)	Peak position
Japanese Albums (Oricon)	2
Japanese Albums (Billboard)	4
Japan Download Albums (mora.jp)	11

=== Monthly charts ===
Chart (2012)	Peak position
Japanese Albums (Oricon)	14

== Release history ==
Region	Date	Label	Distributor	Format
Japan	January 11, 2012	Northern Music	J-Disc Being	CD; CD/DVD; Digital download
Hong Kong	January 13, 2012	Forward Music	Forward Music	CD; CD/DVD; Digital download
Taiwan	January 13, 2012	Forward Music	Forward Music	CD; CD/DVD; Digital download
South Korea	February 1, 2012	CNL Music	CJ E&M	CD; CD/DVD; Digital download
