= Koyoi wa Yume wo Misasete =

Promotional single by Mai Kuraki

from the album Kimi Omou: Shunkashūtō
- Released: August 8, 2018
- Recorded: 2018
- Genre: J-pop
- Length: 4:01
- Label: Northern Music
- Songwriter(s): Mai Kuraki; Sairenji; Mine Kushita
- Producer(s): Mai Kuraki; KANNONJI

Mai Kuraki promotional singles chronology
"Light Up My Life" (2018)	"Koyoi wa Yume wo Misasete" (2018)	"Can You Feel My Heart" (2021)

Music video
- "Koyoi wa Yume wo Misasete" on YouTube

"Koyoi wa Yume wo Misasete" (Japanese: 今宵は夢を見させて, "Let Me Dream a Dream Tonight") is a song recorded by Japanese singer songwriter Mai Kuraki, taken from her twelfth studio album Kimi Omou: Shunkashūtō (2018). The song was released on August 8, 2018 by Northern Music and served as the theme song to the animation Tsukumogami Kashimasu 8.

== Track listing ==
No.	Title	Writer(s)	Arranger(s)	Length
1.	"Koyoi wa Yume wo Misasete"	Mai Kuraki; Sairenji	Mine Kushita	4:01

== Charts ==
=== Daily charts ===
Chart (2018)	Peak position
Japan RecoChoku (RecoChoku Daily Singles)	3
Japan mora (mora Daily Singles)	1
Japan Dwango (Dwango Daily Singles)	8
Japan music.jp (music.jp Daily Singles)	9

=== Weekly charts ===
Chart (2018)	Peak position
Japan RecoChoku (RecoChoku Weekly Singles)	9
Japan mora (mora Weekly Singles)	4
Japan Dwango (Dwango Weekly Singles)	10
Japan music.jp (music.jp Weekly Singles)	9

== Release history ==
Region	Date	Format	Label	Ref.
Japan	August 8, 2018	Digital download	Northern Music	
