= Diamond Wave =

Studio album by Mai Kuraki
- Released: August 2, 2006
- Recorded: 2005–2006
- Genres: Pop, R&B
- Length: 47:49
- Label: Giza Studio
- Producers: Daiko Nagato, Mai Kuraki

Mai Kuraki chronology
Fuse of Love (2005)	Diamond Wave (2006)	One Life (2008)

Singles from Diamond Wave
- 1. "Growing of My Heart" Released: November 9, 2005; 2. "Best of Hero" Released: February 8, 2006; 3. "Diamond Wave" Released: June 21, 2006

Diamond Wave is the sixth studio album by Japanese recording artist Mai Kuraki. It was released on August 2, 2006.

== Background ==
The album was released in two formats: CD+DVD limited edition and CD only standard edition. On August 11, a limited revamped (cover and booklet) standard edition was released. Diamond Wave is Kuraki's first album to be released in various formats. A limited blog called "Diamond Web" was opened in commemoration of the release. To view the blog two passwords enclosed in both the Diamond Wave album and single were needed. To date this is the last studio album released in Giza Studio.

== Chart performance ==
Diamond Wave debuted on the Oricon albums chart at #3 with 78,228 copies sold. The album charted for a total of 12 weeks. Diamond Wave was the 101st best selling album of 2006.

== Track listing ==
All lyrics are written by Mai Kuraki.

CD
No.	Title	Music	Arranger(s)	Length
1.	"Diamond Wave"	Akihito Tokunaga	Tokunaga	4:55
2.	"Ready for Love"	Munetaka Kawamoto	Day Track	3:41
3.	"Best of Hero"	Tokunaga	Tokunaga	4:14
4.	"Juliet"	Hitoshi Okamoto	Okamoto	3:52
5.	"Growing of My Heart"	Aika Ohno	Takeshi Hayama	4:24
6.	"Aitakute..." (会いたくて... "Wanting to see you")	Tokunaga	Tokunaga	4:31
7.	"Hologram" (ホログラム)	Tokunaga	Tokunaga	4:08
8.	"State of Mind"	Ohno	Hayama	4:29
9.	"Ima Kimi to Koko ni" (今 君とここに "Here With You Now")	Masaaki Watanuki	Day Track	4:25
10.	"Cherish the Day"	Masaki Kurechi	Yoshinobu Ohga	4:05
11.	"Voice of Safest Place"	Ohno		4:59
Total length:				47:49

DVD
No.	Title	Length
1.	"Diamond Wave" (Music video)
2.	"Diamond Wave" (Making of)

== Charts ==
Chart (2006)	Peak position
Japan Oricon Daily Albums Chart	2
Japan Oricon Weekly Albums Chart	3
Japan Oricon Monthly Albums Chart	7
Japan Oricon Yearly Albums Chart	101

== Certifications ==
Country	Provider	Sales	Certification (sales thresholds)
Japan	RIAJ	132,476	Gold

== Release history ==
Region	Date	Label	Format
Japan	August 2, 2006	Giza Studio	CD+DVD (Limited Edition)
Japan	August 2, 2006	Giza Studio	CD (Standard Edition)
Japan	August 11, 2006	Giza Studio	CD (Limited Revamped Standard Edition)
