= Season of Love (song) =

Single by Mai Kuraki

from the album One Life
- Released: February 14, 2007
- Recorded: 2006
- Genre: J-Pop
- Label: Giza Studio
- Songwriter(s): Mai Kuraki, Aika Ohno

Mai Kuraki singles chronology
"Shiroi Yuki" (2006)	"Season of Love" (2007)	"Silent Love (Open My Heart)/Be With U" (2007)

"Season of love" is Mai Kuraki's twenty-sixth single, released on February 14, 2007. It is her first collaboration with Aika Ohno and Cybersound since "Time After Time (Hana Mau Machi de)", nearly 4 years ago. "Season of Love" was Kuraki's last single under Giza Studio.

== Usage in media ==
- TV Asahi drama "Shin Kyoto Meikyuu Annai" theme song (#1)

== Track listing ==
All lyrics are written by Mai Kuraki.

No.	Title	Length
1.	"Season of Love"	4:45
2.	"Season of Love: Latin Lover Remix"	5:20
3.	"Shiroi Yuki: Orgel Version"	5:27
4.	"Season of Love: Instrumental"	4:48

== Charts ==
=== Oricon sales chart ===
Release date	Chart	Peak position	First week sales	Sales total
February 14, 2007	Oricon Daily Singles Chart	5		30,597
February 14, 2007	Oricon Weekly Singles Chart	6	20,340	30,597
