= Your Best Friend (song) =

- Regular edition cover

Single by Mai Kuraki

from the album Over the Rainbow
- A-side: "Your Best Friend"
- B-side: "Step by Step"
- Released: October 19, 2011
- Recorded: 2011
- Genre: J-pop
- Length: 16:42 (CD); 22:34 (CD+DVD)
- Label: Northern Music; VNCM-6024 (CD Only); VNCM-6023 (CD+DVD); VNCF-6024 (Musing)
- Songwriters: Mai Kuraki, Giorgio "Giorgio 13" Cancemi
- Producers: Mai Kuraki, Daiko Nagato

Mai Kuraki singles chronology
"Doushite Suki Nandarou" (2011)	"Your Best Friend" (2011)	"Strong Heart" (2011)

"Your Best Friend" is the single by Japanese singer-songwriter Mai Kuraki. It was released on 19 October 2011 through Northern Music, as the third single from her tenth studio album Over the Rainbow. The song served as the theme song to the Japanese animated television series Case Closed.

== Information ==
"Your Best Friend" is the 40th ending theme for Detective Conan. "Step by Step" is the official theme song for the Mie Prefecture-based Nemu no Sato Hotel and Resort.

Both songs were written and arranged by Kuraki and Giorgio "Giorgio 13" Cancemi from the R&B duo So' Fly. Cancemi, a Japanese-Italian, is also behind the song "Doshite Sukinandaro", a song by Cancemi's solo project Nerdhead (on Universal Music Japan label), which featured Kuraki on vocals.

=== Music video and radio airplay ===
This song was launched on Space Shower TV and bayfm Chiba two weeks before its official release.

== Track listing ==
All lyrics are written by Mai Kuraki.

CD
No.	Title	Music	Arranger(s)	Length
1.	"Your Best Friend"	Mai Kuraki; Giorgio Cancemi	Giorgio Cancemi	5:52
2.	"Step by Step"	Kuraki; Cancemi	Cancemi	4:58
3.	"Your Best Friend" (Instrumental)	Kuraki; Cancemi	Cancemi	5:52

Limited edition bonus DVD
No.	Title	Writer(s)	Length
1.	"Your Best Friend" (Music video)	Mai Kuraki; Giorgio Cancemi

== Charts ==
=== Weekly charts ===
Chart (2011)	Peak position
Japan (Oricon)	6
Japan (Japan Hot 100)	10
Japan (Japan Hot Animation)	2
Japan (Japan Top Singles Sales)	10
Japan (Japan Hot 100 Airplay)	21
Japan Download (RIAJ Digital Track Chart)	11
Taiwan (G-Music Combo Chart)	14
Taiwan (G-Music Asian Pop Chart)	3

=== Monthly charts ===
Chart (2011)	Peak position
Japan (Oricon)	25

=== Yearly charts ===
Chart (2011)	Peak position
Japan (Oricon)	261

== Release history ==
Region	Date	Label	Format	Catalog number
Japan	October 19, 2011	Northern Music	CD, CD+DVD, Musing	VNCM-6024 (CD Only), VNCM-6023 (CD+DVD), VNCF-6024 (Musing)
Hong Kong	October 28, 2011	Forward Music	CD	11-20758
Taiwan	October 28, 2011	Forward Music	CD	11-20758
South Korea	November 1, 2011	C&L Music	CD+DVD	CNLR-1123

== See also ==
- Mai Kuraki discography
- Case Closed discography
