= Love, Needing =

Song by Mai Kuraki

Single by Mai Kuraki

from the album Fuse of Love
- B-side: "Moon Serenade, Moonlight"
- Released: January 26, 2005
- Recorded: 2004
- Genre: J-pop
- Label: Giza Studio
- Songwriter(s): Aika Ohno; Mai Kuraki; Hiroshi Asai
- Producer(s): Mai Kuraki

Mai Kuraki singles chronology
"Ashita e Kakeru Hashi" (2004)	"Love, Needing" (2005)	"Dancing" (2005)

"Love, Needing" is a song recorded by Japanese singer songwriter Mai Kuraki, taken from her fifth studio album Fuse of Love. It was released on January 26, 2005, by Giza Studio. The song was written by Aika Ohno, Hiroshi Asai and Kuraki herself, who also produced the single.

== Track listing ==
All lyrics are written by Mai Kuraki.

CD
No.	Title	Music	Arranger(s)	Length
1.	"Love, Needing"	Aika Ohno	Hiroshi Asai	3:18
2.	"Moon Serenade, Moonlight"	Akihito Tokunaga	Tokunaga	4;29
3.	"Ashita e Kakeru Hashi (明日へ架ける橋)" (Ballad version)	Tokunaga	Tokunaga	3:51

== Charts ==
Chart (2005)	Peak position
Japan (Oricon Singles Chart)	5
