= Kaze no La La La =

Single by Mai Kuraki

from the album If I Believe
- Released: May 28, 2003
- Recorded: 2003
- Genre: J-pop
- Label: Giza Studio
- Songwriters: Michiya Haruhata, Mai Kuraki
- Producer: Kanonji

Mai Kuraki singles chronology
| "Kiss" (2003) | "Kaze no La La La" (2003) | "Ashita e Kakeru Hashi" (2004) |

Music video
- "Kaze no La La La" on YouTube

"Kaze no La La La" (風のららら/La La La of the Wind) is Mai Kuraki's 17th single, released on May 28, 2003

== Track listing ==
All lyrics are written by Mai Kuraki.

CD
| No. | Title | Length |
|---|---|---|
| 1. | "Kaze no La La La" | 4:22 |
| 2. | "Gonna Keep on Tryin'" | 4:42 |
| 3. | "Kaze no La La La: TV on air version" | 2:19 |
| 4. | "Kaze no La La La: Feel the wind Mix" | 5:28 |
| 5. | "Kaze no La La La: Instrumental" | 4:22 |

== Usage in media ==
- The 12th "Detective Conan" anime series opening theme.

== Charts ==
=== Oricon Sales Chart ===
| Release date | Chart | Peak position | First week sales | Sales total |
|---|---|---|---|---|
| May 28, 2003 | Oricon Weekly Singles Chart | 3 | 60,652 | 96,198 |
