= Ichibyōgoto ni Love for You =

Single by Mai Kuraki

from the album Touch Me!
- Released: July 9, 2008
- Recorded: 2008
- Genre: J-pop
- Label: Northern Music
- Songwriter(s): Mai Kuraki, Aika Ohno, Hitoshi Okamoto

Mai Kuraki singles chronology
"Yume ga Saku Haru/You and Music and Dream" (2008)	"Ichibyōgoto ni Love for You" (2008)	"24 Xmas Time" (2008)

"Ichibyōgoto ni Love for You" (一秒ごとに Love for you) is Mai Kuraki's twenty-ninth single, released on July 9, 2008. It was released in two formats: limited CD+DVD edition and regular edition. "Ichibyōgoto ni Love for You" served as opening theme for the Meitantei Conan anime series for episodes 505-514 broadcast on Nihon TV. It is Kuraki's ninth contribution to the series.

== Track listing ==
All lyrics are written by Mai Kuraki

CD
No.	Title	Length
1.	"Ichibyōgoto ni Love for You (一秒ごとに Love for you, Love for You Every Second)"	4:00
2.	"Zutto... (ずっと..., Forever...)"	4:13
3.	"Ichibyōgoto ni Love for You (Instrumental)"	4:00
4.	"Zutto... (Instrumental)"	4:11

Limited Edition DVD
No.	Title	Length
1.	"Ichibyōgoto ni Love for You (Music Clip)"

== Charts ==
=== Oricon Sales Chart ===
Release	Chart	Peak Position	First Week Sales	Sales Total	Chart Run
July 9, 2008	Oricon Daily Singles Chart	4			
July 9, 2008	Oricon Weekly Singles Chart	7	21,061	29,640	7 weeks
July 9, 2008	Oricon Monthly Singles Chart	20			
July 9, 2008	Oricon Yearly Singles Chart	248			

=== Billboard Japan Sales Chart ===
Release	Chart	Peak Position
July 9, 2008	Billboard Japan Hot 100	18
July 9, 2008	Billboard Japan Hot 100 Airplay	
July 9, 2008	Billboard Japan Hot Singles Sales	8
