= Light Up My Life =

Promotional single by Mai Kuraki

from the album Kimi Omou: Shunkashūtō
- Released: March 16, 2018
- Recorded: 2017
- Genre: J-pop
- Length: 4:23
- Label: Northern Music
- Songwriter(s): Mai Kuraki; shilo; Shuho Mitani
- Producer(s): Mai Kuraki; KANNONJI

Mai Kuraki promotional singles chronology
"Do It!" (2018)	"Light Up My Life" (2018)	"Koyoi wa Yume wo Misasete" (2018)

Music video
- "Official trailer" on YouTube

"Light Up My Life" is a Japanese-language song recorded by Japanese singer songwriter Mai Kuraki, taken from her twelfth studio album Kimi Omou: Shunkashūtō (2018).. It was released on March 16, 2018 by Northern Music and served as the theme song to the role-playing video game Valkyria Chronicles 4. The song was written by Kuraki herself, shilo and Shuho Mitani.

== Track listing ==
No.	Title	Writer(s)	Arranger(s)	Length
1.	"Light Up My Life"	Mai Kuraki; shilo	Shuho Mitani	4:23
Total length:				4:23

== Credits and personnel ==
Credits adapted from here.

- Mai Kuraki – vocals, backing vocals, writer
- shilo - writer
- Shuho Mitani – writer
- Koichiro Muroya - violin
- Takayuki Yoshimura - piano
- Naoki Kobayashi - bass
- Kanonji – production, executive producer

== Charts ==
=== Weekly charts ===
Chart (2018)	Peak position
Japan (Billboard Japan Top Download Songs)	59
Japan RecoChoku (RecoChoku Weekly Singles)	29
Japan mora (mora Weekly Singles)	11
Japan music.jp (music.jp Weekly Singles)	37
Japan music.jp (Dwango Weekly Singles)	97

== Release history ==
Region	Date	Format	Label
Japan	March 16, 2018	Digital download	Northern Music
