= Shiroi Yuki =

Single by Mai Kuraki

from the album One Life
- Released: December 20, 2006
- Recorded: 2006
- Genre: J-Pop
- Label: GIZA studio
- Songwriter(s): Mai Kuraki, Aika Ohno

Mai Kuraki singles chronology
"Diamond Wave" (2006)	"Shiroi Yuki" (2006)	"Season of Love" (2007)

"Shiroi Yuki" (白い雪, lit. White Snow) is Mai Kuraki's twenty-fifth single, released on December 20, 2006. The song was first unveiled on the last day of Kuraki's Live Tour 2006 Diamond Wave and premiered on radio on NBS's "Azuma Takahiro no Young Peace" November 30. "Shiroi Yuki" was her first single in five years (since "always") and was used as an ending theme for the long-running anime series Detective Conan.

== Usage in media ==
- NTV anime "Meitantei Conan" ending theme (#1)

== Track listing ==
All lyrics are written by Mai Kuraki.

No.	Title	Length
1.	"Shiroi Yuki (白い雪, White Snow)"	4:49
2.	"Omoi no Hate ni... (想いの先に..., Before the Feelings...)"	4:37

== Charts ==
=== Oricon sales chart ===
Release date	Chart	Peak position	First week sales	Sales total
December 20, 2006	Oricon Daily Singles Chart	2		43,721
December 20, 2006	Oricon Weekly Singles Chart	4	23,937	43,721
