= Best of Hero =

2006 Single by Mai Kuraki

Single by Mai Kuraki

from the album Diamond Wave
- Released: February 8, 2006
- Recorded: 2005
- Genre: J-pop; pop rock
- Length: 4:15
- Label: Giza Studio
- Songwriter(s): Mai Kuraki; Akihito Tokunaga
- Producer(s): Mai Kuraki; Kannonji

Mai Kuraki singles chronology
"Growing of My Heart" (2005)	"Best of Hero" (2006)	"Diamond Wave" (2006)

"Best of Hero" (ベスト オブ ヒーロー) is a song recorded by Japanese singer Mai Kuraki. It was released on February 8, 2006 through Giza Studio as the second single from her sixth studio album, Diamond Wave (2006). The track was written by Kuraki and Akihito Tokunaga, while the production was taken by Kuraki and Kannonji. A rock-influenced J-pop song, "Best of Hero" lyrically cheers up those who are struggling with the personal issues, calling them "heroes".

"Best of Hero" served as the Japanese television drama series, Gachibaka! (2006). The song reached number five in Japan, becoming Kuraki's 23rd consecutive top ten in the country since her debut single, "Love, Day After Tomorrow" (1999).

== Track listing ==
CD single
No.	Title	Writer(s)	Arranger(s)	Length
1.	"Best of Hero" (ベスト オブ ヒーロー)	Mai Kuraki; Akihito Tokunaga	Tokunaga	4:15
2.	"Cuz You'll Know That You're Right"	Kuraki; Miki Fuji	Yoshinobu Ohga	3:43
3.	"Best of Hero" (Instrumental)	Kuraki; Tokunaga	Tokunaga	4:14
Total length:				12:12

== Charts ==
=== Daily charts ===
Chart (2006)	Peak position
Japan (Oricon)	4

=== Weekly charts ===
Chart (2006)	Peak position
Japan (Oricon)	5

=== Monthly charts ===
Chart (2006)	Peak position
Japan (Oricon)	17

== Certification and sales ==
Region	Certification	Certified units/sales
Japan (RIAJ)	None	57,741 (CD)

== Release history ==
Release dates and formats for "Perfect Illusion"
Region	Date	Format	Catalogue Num.	Label	Ref.
Japan	February 8, 2006	CD	GZCA-7068	Giza Studio	
Taiwan	February 8, 2006	CD	Shinkong-Being Multimedia	SBCS-6002	
