= Tsukumogami Kashimasu =

Japanese novel and anime series

- The cover of the first edition.

つくもがみ貸します
- Novel
- Written by: Megumi Hatakenaka
- Published by: Kadokawa Shoten
- Published: September 25, 2007
- Novel

Tsukumogami, Asobō yo
- Written by: Megumi Hatakenaka
- Published by: Kadokawa Shoten
- Published: March 26, 2013
- Anime television series
- Directed by: Masahiko Murata
- Written by: Kento Shimoyama
- Music by: Gō Satō
- Studio: Telecom Animation Film
- Licensed by: BI: Anime Limited; SA/SEA: Medialink
- Original network: NHK General TV
- Original run: July 22, 2018 – October 14, 2018
- Episodes: 12

Tsukumogami Kashimasu (Japanese: つくもがみ貸します; "Tsukumogami For Rent") is a Japanese novel written by Megumi Hatakenaka and published in 2007. A sequel, titled Tsukumogami, Asobō yo (つくもがみ、遊ぼうよ; "Tsukumogami, Let's Play"), was published in 2013. An anime television series adaptation premiered from July to October 2018. Crunchyroll is streaming the series under the title We Rent Tsukumogami.

== Plot ==
Okō and Seiji own and run the Izumo-ya lending shop in the Fukagawa district of Edo. Several of the items they lend are old and have become tsukumogami. Seiji is clever and, with the help of the tsukumogami, has a reputation for being able to solve mysteries and other difficult problems. One of those mysteries is the whereabouts of Satarō, a man who was once interested in Okō despite being engaged to another woman.

== Characters ==
Seiji (清次)
Voiced by: Junya Enoki
Okō's younger brother
Okō (お紅)
Voiced by: Mikako Komatsu
Seiji's older sister
Satarō (佐太郎)
Voiced by: Takahiro Sakurai
heir to the Iida-ya shop
Notetsu (野鉄)
Voiced by: Tōru Nara
a bat-shaped netsuke tsukumogami
Tsukuyomi (月夜見)
Voiced by: Yutaka Nakano
a full moon kakemono tsukumogami
Goi (五位)
Voiced by: Daisuke Hirakawa
a kiseru tsukumogami
Ohime (お姫)
Voiced by: Satomi Akesaka
a princess doll tsukumogami
Usagi (うさぎ)
Voiced by: Yuka Iguchi
a comb tsukumogami
Narrator
Voiced by: Aionsuke Kataoka

== Media ==
=== Novel ===
The novel is written by Megumi Hatakenaka, and Kadokawa Shoten published it on September 25, 2007 (ISBN 978-4-04-873786-9). A second edition was published on June 23, 2010 (ISBN 978-4-04-388802-3). Hatakenaka published a sequel, titled Tsukumogami, Asobō yo, on March 26, 2013 (ISBN 978-4-04-110409-5), and the second edition was published on April 23, 2016 (ISBN 978-4-04-103880-2).

=== Anime ===
NHK announced an anime television series adaptation on October 23, 2017. The series is directed by Masahiko Murata and written by Kento Shimoyama, with animation by studio Telecom Animation Film. Miho Yano and Hiromi Yoshinuma are designing the characters based on the original designs by Lily Hoshino. Natsue Muramoto serves as the series' art director, Ryoko Oka provides color design, Yūko Kamahara is the director of photography, and Yasunori Ebina serves as sound director. Music for the series is composed by Gō Satō. "Miyavi vs. Kavka Shishido performed the opening theme song, and Mai Kuraki performed the ending theme song. TMS Entertainment produced the anime. Anime Limited acquired the series for distribution in the United Kingdom and Ireland.

The series premiered on NHK General TV from July 22 to October 14, 2018.

== See also ==
- Shabake, another novel series by the same writer
