= Winter Bells =

Single by Mai Kuraki

from the album Fairy Tale
- B-side: "Thankful"
- Released: January 17, 2002
- Recorded: 2001
- Genre: J-pop
- Label: Giza Studio
- Songwriter(s): Akihito Tokunaga, Mai Kuraki
- Producer(s): KANONJI

Mai Kuraki singles chronology
"Can't Forget Your Love/Perfect Crime: Single Edit" (2001)	"Winter Bells" (2002)	"Feel Fine!" (2002)

"Winter Bells" is a song by Japanese singer Mai Kuraki. It was released by GIZA Studio on January 17, 2002, as Kuraki's 11th single. The song was used as the opening theme for the anime Detective Conan and the ending theme for the OVA Detective Conan: 16 Suspects.

== Background and release ==
The song was used as the opening theme for the anime Detective Conan and the ending theme for the OVA Detective Conan: 16 Suspects. This was her fourth collaboration for Detective Conan but was her first opening theme for the series. It was also her first Christmas song, though it was released after Christmas. The first limited edition included a "Mai-K Special Conan Card" based on Detective Conan.

== Track listing ==
CD
No.	Title	Writer(s)	Arranger(s)	Length
1.	"Winter Bells"	Mai Kuraki; Akihito Tokunaga	Tokunaga	4:39
2.	"Thankful"	Kuraki; Keith Bazzle; Tomoo Kasahara; Yoko Black. Stone	Kasahara; Stone	4:00
3.	"Always" (Gomi's Liar Remix / Radio Edit)	Kuraki; Aika Ohno	DJ Gomi	4:40
4.	"Winter Bells" (Instrumental)	Kuraki; Tokunaga	Tokunaga	4:39

== Charts ==
=== Oricon Sales Chart ===
Release date	Chart	Peak position	First week sales	Sales total
January 17, 2002	Oricon Weekly Singles Chart	1	111,480	258,310
January 17, 2002	Oricon Yearly Singles Chart	41		258,310
