= Strong Heart (Mai Kuraki song) =

Single by Mai Kuraki

from the album Over the Rainbow
- B-side: "Kimi no Koe"
- Released: November 23, 2011
- Recorded: 2011, Japan
- Genre: J-pop
- Length: 4:11
- Label: Northern Music
- Songwriter(s): Mai Kuraki; GIORGIO 13; Aika Ohno; Cybersound
- Producer(s): Mai Kuraki; Daiko Nagato

Mai Kuraki singles chronology
| "Your Best Friend" (2011) | "Strong Heart" (2011) | "Koi ni Koishite" (2011) |

Music video
- "Strong Heart" on YouTube

"Strong Heart" is the song by Japanese singer Mai Kuraki for her tenth studio album, "Over the Rainbow" (2012). It was written by Kuraki and GIORGIO 13. This song was a released as a DVD single, under the name "Strong Heart: from Mai Kuraki Premium Live One for all, All for one".

== Chart performance ==
In Japan, "Strong Heart" entered the Japan Oricon Weekly DVD chart at number 7, selling 19,859 physical copies in its first week. This song also charted on Billboard Japan Hot 100 at number 63 without physical sales.

In Taiwan, this song entered the G-Music DVD chart at number 3.

== Live performance ==
In 2012, she performed this song at Nippon Budokan during her live tour "Mai Kuraki Premium Live One for all, All for one". This movie is included in the DVD.

== Usage in media ==
This song was used as ending theme of the Japanese drama, "Hunter".

== Track listings ==
All lyrics are written by Mai Kuraki

Standard edition
| No. | Title | Music | Arranger(s) | Length |
|---|---|---|---|---|
| 1. | "Strong Heart" (from "Mai Kuraki Premium Live One for all, All for one") | Giorgio 13 | 13 |
| 2. | "always" (from "Mai Kuraki Premium Live One for all, All for one") | Aika Ohno | Cybersound |

Bonus disc
| No. | Title | Music | Arranger(s) | Length |
|---|---|---|---|---|
| 1. | "Strong Heart" | Girogio 13 | 13 | 4:18 |
| 2. | "Kimi no koe" | 13 | 13 | 5:16 |
| 3. | "Strong Heart" (Instrumental) | 13 | 13 | 4:18 |
| Total length: | | | | 13:59 |

Bonus disc 2
| No. | Title | Music | Arranger(s) | Length |
|---|---|---|---|---|
| 1. | "Doshite Suki nandaro" (winter version) | 13 | 13 | 5:58 |
| Total length: | | | | 5:58 |

== Personnel ==
- Mai Kuraki – vocals, backing vocals, lyrics, producer
- Aika Ohno – composer
- GIORGIO 13 – composer
- Cybersound – composer
- Daiko Nagato – producer

== Charts ==
| Chart (2009) | Peak position |
|---|---|
| Japan Oricon DVD Chart | 7 |
| Japan Oricon Musical DVD Chart | 4 |
| Billboard Japan Hot 100 | 63 |
| G-Music DVD Chart (Taiwan) | 3 |
