= Kiss (Mai Kuraki song) =

Single by Mai Kuraki

from the album If I Believe
- Released: April 30, 2003
- Genre: J-pop, R&B
- Label: Giza Studio
- Songwriter: Mai Kuraki
- Producers: YOKO Black Stone (composer); Akihito Tokunaga (composer)

Mai Kuraki singles chronology
"Time After Time (Hana Mau Machi de)" (2003)	"Kiss" (2003)	"Kaze no La La La" (2003)

"Kiss" is Japanese recording artist Mai Kuraki's sixteenth single released on April 30, 2003. The single peaked at number 3 on the Oricon singles chart and spent three weeks in the top 20 of the chart. It stayed on the chart for nine weeks, the last being July 7, 2003. It was certified Gold by the Recording Industry Association of Japan (RIAJ) for shipments of 100,000 copies.

== Track listing ==
All lyrics are written by Mai Kuraki.

CD single
No.	Title	Producer(s)	Length
1.	"Kiss"	Yoko Blaqstone	4:37
2.	"You Are Not This Only One"	Akihito Tokunaga	4:04
3.	"Kiss (Instrumental)"	Yoko Blaqstone	4:35

== Charts ==
Chart	Peak position	Sales
Oricon Weekly Singles Chart	3	71,338
Oricon Yearly Singles Chart	92	112,092
