= Mō Ichido =

Single by Mai Kuraki
- Released: May 25, 2011
- Recorded: 2011
- Genre: J-pop
- Length: 3:57
- Label: Northern Music
- Songwriters: Mai Kuraki; Hirokazu Tajiri
- Producers: Mai Kuraki, Daiko Nagato

Mai Kuraki singles chronology
"1000 Mankai no Kiss" (2010)	"Mō Ichido" (2011)	"Doushite Suki Nandarou" (2011)

Music video
- "Mō Ichido" on YouTube

"Mō Ichido" (Japanese: もう一度; "Once More") is a song by Japanese singer-songwriter Mai Kuraki. The song was released as second single from her tenth studio album Over the Rainbow on May 25, 2011.

== Overview ==
The song is the theme song for the drama "The Devil Lives in the Fog" broadcast by Tokai Television.

The single will be released in two forms: a limited first edition and a regular edition, as well as a Musing&FC edition available only to fan club members and Musing members, making it effectively a three-issue set. The jackets are also different for each. The standard part numbers are VNCM-6021 for the limited first edition and VNCM-6022 for the regular edition, and the limited first edition includes an original promise ring designed by Kuraki (3 kinds in total) as a bonus. This is the only CD single by Kuraki that contains only one song, excluding instrumentals, in either format.

== In popular culture ==
"Mō Ichido" served as the theme song to the television series Kiri ni Sumu Akuma.

== Track listing ==
All lyrics are written by Mai Kuraki.

CD
No.	Title	Music	Arranger(s)	Length
1.	"Mō Ichido"	Jinichi Tajiri	Jinichi Tajiri	3:57
2.	"Mō Ichido" (Instrumental)	Tajiri	Tajiri	3:54
Total length:				7:51

== Release history ==
Region	Date	Version	Format	Label
Various	May 25, 2011	Standard edition	Digital download	Northern Music
Various	May 25, 2011	Standard edition	CD	Northern Music
Various	May 25, 2011	Limited edition	CD+Merchandise	Northern Music
Various	May 25, 2011	Musing & FC edition	CD	Northern Music
