= Feel Fine! =

2002 single by Mai Kuraki

Single by Mai Kuraki

from the album Fairy Tale
- Released: April 24, 2002
- Genre: J-pop
- Label: Giza Studio
- Songwriter(s): Mai Kuraki; Akihito Tokunaga
- Producer(s): KANONJI

Mai Kuraki singles chronology
| "Winter Bells" (2000) | "Feel Fine!" (2002) | "Like a Star in the Night" (2002) |

Music video
- "Feel Fine!" on YouTube

"Feel Fine!" is a song by Japanese singer songwriter Mai Kuraki, taken from her third studio album Fairy Tale (2002). It was released on April 24, 2002 by Giza Studio, simultaneously with her first remix album Cool City Production Vol. 3 "Mai-K's Club Side". The song was written by Kuraki herself and Akihito Tokunaga and served as the commercial song to Shiseido's brand "Sea Breeze". The remixes of the song Cool City Production Vol. 4 "Mai-K" Feel Fine! was released later.

== Commercial performance ==
"Feel Fine!" debuted at number two on the Oricon weekly singles chart. It has sold over 451,500 copies as of 2018 and been certificated double platinum by Recording Industry Association of Japan (RIAJ). It has been her sixth best-selling song and considered as one of her representative songs.

== Track listing ==
CD single
| No. | Title | Writer(s) | Arranger(s) | Length |
|---|---|---|---|---|
| 1. | "Feel Fine!" | Mai Kuraki; Akihito Tokunaga | Tokunaga | 4:50 |
| 2. | "Rescue Me" | Kuraki; YOKO Black. Stone | Stone | 4:26 |
| 3. | "Mai-K Dub Edition" (K.F.A. Discotheque Master Mix) | | | 5:04 |
| 4. | "Feel Fine!" (Instrumental) | Kuraki; Tokunaga | Tokunaga |

== Charts ==
=== Weekly charts ===
| Chart (2002) | Peak position |
|---|---|
| Japan (Oricon) | 2 |

=== Year-end charts ===
| Chart (2002) | Position |
|---|---|
| Japan (Oricon) | 16 |

== Certification and sales ==
| Region | Certification | Certified units/sales |
|---|---|---|
| Japan (RIAJ) | Platinum | 400,000^{^} |
^{^} Shipments figures based on certification alone.

== Release history ==
| Region | Date | Format | Label | Ref. |
|---|---|---|---|---|
| Japan | April 24, 2002 | CD single | Giza Studio | |
| Taiwan | April 24, 2002 | CD single | Shin Kong Being | |

== La PomPon version ==
"Feel Fine!"
- Standard edition/digital download cover

Single by La PomPon

from the album Best of La PomPon
- Released: August 30, 2017
- Genre: J-pop
- Label: Being
- Songwriter(s): Mai Kuraki; Akihito Tokunaga; Hirohito Furui

La PomPon singles chronology
| "Omoide no Kyuujuu Kurihama" / "Koi no BGM (Ima wa, Kataomoi)" (2016) | "Feel Fine!" / "Mr. Lonely Boy" (2017) |

Music video
- "Feel Fine!" on YouTube

Japanese idol girl group La PomPon released a cover version of the song on August 30, 2017 as their sixth single from their first compilation album Best of La PomPon. The song was released as a double-A side with their original song, "Mr. Lonely Boy".

=== Music video ===
A short version of the official music video was released on the group's official YouTube account on July 25, 2017. As of March 2018, it has received over 40,000 views on YouTube.

=== Track listing ===
Standard edition/digital download
| No. | Title | Writer(s) | Arranger(s) | Length |
|---|---|---|---|---|
| 1. | "Feel Fine!" | Mai Kuraki; Akihito Tokunaga | Hirohito Furui | 4:22 |
| 2. | "Mr. Lonely Boy" | Hidefusa Iwata | Iwata; Daisuke Nagano | 3:53 |
| 3. | "Friends" | Gen; Yoji Noi | Noi | 4:41 |

Deluxe edition
| No. | Title | Writer(s) | Arranger(s) | Length |
|---|---|---|---|---|
| 1. | "Feel Fine!" | Mai Kuraki; Akihito Tokunaga | Hirohito Furui | 4:22 |
| 2. | "Mr. Lonely Boy" | Hidefusa Iwata | Iwata; Daisuke Nagano | 3:53 |
| 3. | "Sunset Dream" | Kiri; Kazuya Fukuta | Seiya Haga |
| 4. | "Bump!!" (Summer Remix) | Miki Fujisue | Masahiro Fujisaki |

DVD (Deluxe edition)
| No. | Title | Length |
|---|---|---|
| 1. | "Feel Fine!" (Music video) |
| 2. | "Feel Fine!" (Making) |

Limited edition
| No. | Title | Writer(s) | Arranger(s) | Length |
|---|---|---|---|---|
| 1. | "Mr. Lonely Boy" | Hidefusa Iwata | Iwata; Daisuke Nagano | 3:53 |
| 2. | "Feel Fine!" | Mai Kuraki; Akihito Tokunaga | Hirohito Furui | 4:22 |

=== Charts ===
==== Weekly charts ====
| Chart (2017) | Peak position |
|---|---|
| Japan (Oricon) | 19 |
| Japan (Japan Hot 100) | 70 |

=== Release history ===
| Region | Date | Format | Label |
|---|---|---|---|
| Japan | August 30, 2017 | CD single (Standard edition) | Being |
| Japan | August 30, 2017 | CD single/DVD (Deluxe edition) | Being |
| Japan | August 30, 2017 | CD single/Photo book/Ticket (Limited edition) | Being |
| Japan | August 30, 2017 | Digital download | Being |
