= Diamond Wave (song) =

- CD single cover

Single by Mai Kuraki

from the album Diamond Wave
- B-side: "Safest Place"
- Released: June 21, 2006
- Genre: J-pop
- Label: Giza Studio
- Songwriter(s): Mai Kuraki; Akihito Tokunaga
- Producer(s): KANONJI

Mai Kuraki singles chronology
"Best of Hero" (2006)	"Diamond Wave" (2006)	"Shiroi Yuki" (2006)

"Diamond Wave" is a song recorded by Japanese singer songwriter Mai Kuraki, taken from her sixth studio album Diamond Wave (2006). It was released on June 21, 2006 by Giza Studio. The song was written by Kuraki herself and Akihito Tokunaga. The remix version of the song "Grand Bleu Mix" was released into the US market on the same day.

== Track listing ==
CD single
No.	Title	Writer(s)	Remixer	Length
1.	"Diamond Wave"	Mai Kuraki; Akihito Tokunaga		4:57
2.	"Safest Place"	Kuraki; Aika Ohno; Daisuke Ikeda		5:02
3.	"Diamond Wave" (Grand Bleu Mix)	Kuraki; Tokunaga	Dr. Heat	5:20

Grand Bleu Mix
No.	Title	Writer(s)	Remixer	Length
1.	"Diamond Wave" (Grand Bleu Mix)	Kuraki; Tokunaga	Dr. Heat	5:20

== Charts ==
=== Weekly charts ===
Chart (2006)	Peak position
Japan (Oricon)	7

== Certification and sales ==
Region	Certification	Certified units/sales
Japan (RIAJ)	None	30,977(physical sales)

== Release history ==
Region	Date	Format	Label	Ref.
Japan	June 21, 2006	CD single	Giza Studio	
United States	June 21, 2006	Digital download (Grand Bleu Mix)	Giza Studio	
