= 1000 Mankai no Kiss =

Single by Mai Kuraki
- B-side: "Sayonara wa Mada Iwanaide"
- Released: March 9, 2011
- Recorded: 2010–2011
- Genre: J-pop
- Length: 5:03
- Label: Northern Music
- Composer(s): Aika Ohno
- Lyricist(s): Mai Kuraki
- Producer(s): KANONJI

Mai Kuraki singles chronology
"Summer Time Gone" (2010)	"1000 Mankai no Kiss" (2011)	"Mou Ichido" (2011)

Music video
- "1000 Mankai no Kiss" on YouTube

"1000 Mankai No Kiss " (1000万回のキス, 1000 Mankai no Kisu, meaning "10 Million Times Kiss") is a song recorded by Japanese singer songwriter Mai Kuraki, taken from her tenth studio album Over the Rainbow (2012). The song was written by Kuraki, Aika Ohno and Takeshi Hayama and served as the commercial song to the KOSÉ's brand, Esprique Precious. Ohno covered the song on her third studio album Silent Passage (2013).

== Track listing ==
All lyrics are written by Mai Kuraki

CD
No.	Title	Music	Arranger(s)	Length
1.	"1000 Mankai No Kiss (1000万回のキス; 10 Million Times Kiss)"	Aika Ohno	Takeshi Hayama	5:02
2.	"Sayonara wa Madaiwanai de (さよならは まだ言わないで; Don't Say Goodbye Yet)"	Footbread	Footbread	4:38
3.	"1000 Mankai No Kiss" (Instrumental)	Ohno	Hayama	5:05
4.	"Sayonara wa Madaiwanai de" (Instrumental)	Footbread	Footbread	4:35

All lyrics are written by Mai Kuraki

Digital download
No.	Title	Music	Arranger(s)	Length
1.	"1000 Mankai No Kiss (1000万回のキス; 10 Million Times Kiss)"	Aika Ohno	Takeshi Hayama	5:02
2.	"Sayonara wa Madaiwanai de (さよならは まだ言わないで; Don't Say Goodbye Yet)"	Footbread	Footbread	4:38

== Charts ==
=== Weekly charts ===
Chart (2011)	Peak position
Japan (Oricon)	4

=== Monthly charts ===
Chart (2011)	Peak position
Japan (Oricon)	16

=== Year-end charts ===
Chart (2011)	Position
Japan (Oricon)	257

== Certification and sales ==
Region	Certification	Certified units/sales
Japan (RIAJ)		25,013

== Release history ==
Region	Date	Label	Format
Japan	March 9, 2011	Northern Music	CD (Standard edition)
Japan	March 9, 2011	Northern Music	CD/Photo book (Limited edition)
Japan	March 9, 2011	Northern Music	CD (FC & Musing edition)
Japan	March 9, 2011	Northern Music	Digital download
