= Growing of My Heart =

Single by Mai Kuraki

from the album Diamond Wave
- B-side: "Seven Nights"; "Winter*Swear"
- Released: November 9, 2005
- Recorded: 2005
- Genre: J-pop
- Label: Giza Studio
- Songwriter(s): Mai Kuraki; Aika Ohno; Takeshi Hayama

Mai Kuraki singles chronology
"P.S My Sunshine" (2005)	"Growing of My Heart" (2005)	"Best of Hero" (2006)

"Growing of My Heart" is a song recorded by Japanese singer and songwriter Mai Kuraki, which she released as the lead single from her sixth album, Diamond Wave (2006). The song was written by Kuraki herself, Aika Ohno and Takeshi Hayama and released on November 9, 2005.

"Growing of My Heart" was a commercial success, reaching number seven in Japan and selling approximately 62,000 copies. The song served as the sixteenth opening theme to the Japanese television anime series, Case Closed.

== Track listing ==
CD single
No.	Title	Writer(s)	Length
1.	"Growing of My Heart"	Mai Kuraki; Aika Ohno; Takeshi Hayama	4:27
2.	"Seven Nights"	Kuraki; Ohno; Hayama	4:09
3.	"Winter*Swear"	Kuraki; Cybersound	3:47

== Charts ==
=== Weekly charts ===
Chart (2005)	Peak position
Japan (Oricon)	7

=== Monthly charts ===
Chart (2005)	Peak position
Japan (Oricon)	13

== Certification and sales ==
Region	Certification	Certified units/sales
Japan (RIAJ)	None	62,299

== Release history ==
Region	Date	Format	Label	Ref.
Japan	November 9, 2005	CD single	Giza Studio	
