= 24 Xmas Time =

Single by Mai Kuraki

from the album Touch Me!
- Released: November 26, 2008
- Recorded: 2008
- Genre: J-pop
- Label: Northern Music
- Songwriter(s): Mai Kuraki, All The Rage, Hae Joon Yoo

Mai Kuraki singles chronology
"Ichibyōgoto ni Love for You" (2008)	"24 Xmas Time" (2008)	"Puzzle/Revive" (2009)

"24 Xmas Time" is Mai Kuraki's thirtieth single, released on November 26, 2008. It was released in two formats: limited CD+DVD edition and regular edition. The title track, "24 Xmas Time", features a rap sequence by hip-hop artist Ken-Ryw.

== Usage in media ==
- TBS "Koisuru Hanikami!" November ending theme (#1)
- Music.jp CM song (#1)
- Daiba Memorial Tree image song (#1)

== Track listing ==
All lyrics are written by Mai Kuraki

Limited Edition CD
No.	Title	Length
1.	"24 Xmas Time"	4:17
2.	"All I Want"	5:01
3.	"24 Xmas Time (Instrumental)"	4:17
4.	"All I Want (Instrumental)"	4:58

Limited Edition DVD
No.	Title	Length
1.	"24 Xmas Time (Music Clip)"

Regular Edition CD
No.	Title	Length
1.	"24 Xmas Time"	4:17
2.	"All I Want"	5:01
3.	"24 Xmas Time (Grinch Remix) (Bonus track)"	5:38
4.	"24 Xmas Time (Instrumental)"	4:17
5.	"All I Want (Instrumental)"	4:58

== Charts ==
=== Oricon sales chart ===
Release	Chart	Peak position	First week sales	Sales total
November 26, 2008	Oricon Daily Singles Chart	5		
November 26, 2008	Oricon Weekly Singles Chart	7	21,002	26,586
November 26, 2008	Oricon Monthly Singles Chart	25		
November 26, 2008	Oricon Yearly Singles Chart	305		

=== Billboard Japan sales chart ===
Release	Chart	Peak position
November 26, 2008	Billboard Japan Hot 100	7
November 26, 2008	Billboard Japan Hot 100 Airplay	17
November 26, 2008	Billboard Japan Hot Singles Sales	6
