= Touch Me! =

Studio album by Mai Kuraki
- Released: January 21, 2009
- Recorded: 2008
- Genres: Pop, R&B
- Length: 47:26
- Label: Northern Music
- Producers: Mai Kuraki, Daiko Nagato

Mai Kuraki chronology
One Life (2008)	Touch Me! (2009)	All My Best (2009)

Singles from Touch Me!
- 1. "Yume ga Saku Haru/You and Music and Dream" Released: March 19, 2008; 2. "Ichibyōgoto ni Love for You" Released: July 9, 2008; 3. "24 Xmas Time" Released: November 26, 2008

Touch Me! is the Japanese singer-songwriter Mai Kuraki's eighth studio album, which was released on January 21, 2009, in Japan by her record label Northern Music. The album was released in two formats; the regular single CD version and a limited CD+DVD version, whose content contained a behind the scenes look at the making of the album, as well as an interview and clips from her 2008 tour. The album follows the same pattern as "One Life", in which Kuraki collaborated with new composers.

Three singles were released from the album; the first, "Yume ga Saku Haru/You and Music and Dream," which debuted at number five on the Oricon single weekly chart. The second single and third single were, "Ichibyōgoto ni Love for You" and "24 Xmas Time". Both singles charted at number seven on the Oricon charts.

Selling 50,250 units in its first week, the album debuted at the number-one on the Oricon album weekly chart, becoming Kuraki's first album in five years to appear at the top spot.

== Commercial performance ==
Professional ratings
Review scores
Source	Rating
allmusic	3/5 stars

Released on January 21, 2009, in both Japan and Taiwan, the album proved to be successful in both countries. In Japan, Touch Me! debuted at number-one on the Oricon album daily chart. By the end of the charting week, the album took the number-one spot on the Oricon album weekly at number-one with 50,250 units sold in its first week. This made Touch Me! Kuraki's first number-one album in five years, with this last occurring with her first best of album, Wish You the Best (2004).

In Taiwan, the album debuted at number-one on the J-Pop music chart, with 8.75% of the sales on the chart. The album stayed atop of the chart in its second and third week, with 6.55% and 4.38% of the sales, respectively. In its fourth week on the chart, Touch Me! was pushed down to number three, with 2.28% of the sales. The first and second place was occupied by Korean pop boy band TVXQ's twenty-fifth Japanese-language single, "Bolero/Kiss the Baby Sky/Wasurenaide" and the Ponyo soundtrack. However, on the Combo chart, the album debuted at number twelve, with 0.66% of sales. By the second week, the album dropped to number twenty, selling 0.44%.

== Singles ==
The first single from the album was the double A-side, "Yume ga Saku Haru/You and Music and Dream" which was released on March 19, 2008. The single debuted at number five on the Oricon weekly chart, selling 20,390 units in the first week. The second single, "Ichibyōgoto ni Love for You", was released on July 9, 2008. The single debuted at number seven on charts and sold 21,061 units in its first week. The third and final single from the album was "24 Xmas Time", which was released on November 26, 2008. Like the previous single, "24 Xmas Time" also charted at number seven selling it sold 21,002 units in its first week, 59 units less than "Ichibyōgoto ni Love for You".

== Track listing ==
All lyrics are written by Mai Kuraki, except "Top of the World", which was written by John Bettis.

CD
No.	Title	Music	Arranger(s)	Length
1.	"Touch Me!"	Yue Mochizuki	Cybersound	5:09
2.	"Ichibyōgoto ni Love for You"	Aika Ohno	Cybersound	3:57
3.	"Break the Tone"	Mari Fujita	Fujita, Day Track	3:32
4.	"Yume ga Saku Haru"	Akihito Tokunaga	Tokunaga	3:54
5.	"I Can't Believe You!!"	Free-role J	Free-role J	3:50
6.	"Secret Lover"	Free-role J	Free-role J	3:43
7.	"Hello!"	Hidekazu Uchiike	Daisuke Ikeda	3:53
8.	"24 Xmas Time"	All The Rage	All The Rage, JJ, Carlos H	4:14
9.	"Catch"	Takahiro Hiraga	Hiraga	4:14
10.	"You and Music and Dream"	Aika Ohno	Cybersound	4:06
11.	"Top of the World" (Special Track)	Richard Lynn Carpenter		3:00
12.	"Yume ga Saku Haru: Remix (夢が咲く春 -remix-)" (Special Track)	Akihito Tokunaga	Remixed by Tokunaga	3:54

Limited Edition DVD
No.	Title	Length
1.	"Inside of Touch Me!: Mai Kuraki ga Kataru "Touch Me!" (Inside of touch Me ! 〜倉木麻衣が語る"touch Me!"〜, Inside of Touch Me!: Mai Kuraki Talks "Touch Me!")"

== Charts ==
Chart (2009)	Peak position	Certification (threshold)
Japan Oricon album Daily Chart	1	Gold
Japan Oricon album Weekly Chart	1	Gold

== Release history ==
Country	Date	Label	Format	Catalog
Japan	January 21, 2009	Northern Music	CD+DVD	VNCM-9004
Japan	January 21, 2009	Northern Music	CD	VNCM-9005
Taiwan	January 21, 2009	SK-Being	CD	SBCA-9001
Korea	February 11, 2009	CJ E&M	CD	CMAC-8387
