= One Life (Mai Kuraki album) =

Studio album by Mai Kuraki
- Released: January 1, 2008
- Recorded: 2006–2007
- Studio: Birdman West; Redway; Studio Terra; Formula Studio; Hitvision Studio; Cybersound Boston
- Genre: R&B; J-pop
- Length: 49:22
- Label: Northern Music
- Producer: Mai Kuraki; Daiko Nagato

Mai Kuraki chronology
Diamond Wave (2006)	One Life (2008)	Touch Me! (2009)

Singles from One Life
- 1. "Shiroi Yuki" Released: December 20, 2006; 2. "Season of Love" Released: February 14, 2007; 3. "Silent Love (Open My Heart)/Be With U" Released: November 28, 2007

One Life is the seventh studio album by Japanese recording artist Mai Kuraki. It was released on January 1, 2008. The album is Kuraki's first under the Northern Music label.

== Background ==
One Life is Kuraki's second self-produced album. Unlike her previous albums where she worked almost exclusively with Aika Ohno and Akihito Tokunaga, for One Life Kuraki sought out various Being musicians to participate in the production of the album. The sound is reminiscent of her earlier, more R&B-driven albums such as Delicious Way and Perfect Crime.

== Chart performance ==
One Life debuted on the Oricon albums chart at #14 with 62,662 copies sold (due to two weeks' sales combination), making it Kuraki's first album to open/peak outside of the top 10. The album charted for a total of 11 weeks. One Life was the 117th best selling album of 2008.

== Track listing ==
All lyrics are written by Mai Kuraki except track 12 which is a cover of "Over The Rainbow", written by E.Y. Harburg.

No.	Title	Music	Arranger(s)	Length
1.	"One Life"	Martin Ankelius, Henrik Andersson-Tervald	Ankelius, Andersson-Tervald	3:34
2.	"I Like It Like That"	Ricky Hanley, Darren Woodford, Lynn Slater	Radi8	3:15
3.	"One for Me"	Yoo Hae Joon	Yoo	4:14
4.	"Born to Be Free"	Akihito Tokunaga	Cybersound (Michael Africk, Perry Geyer, Miguel Sa Pessoa)	3:11
5.	"Shiroi Yuki"	Aika Ohno	Daisuke Ikeda	4:47
6.	"Silent Love (Open My Heart)"	Daisuke "DAIS" Miyachi, Yuichi Ohno	Miyachi, Y. Ohno	4:25
7.	"Everything"	Takanori Fujimoto	Fujimoto	3:25
8.	"Season of Love"	A. Ohno	Cybersound (Michael Africk, Perry Geyer, Miguel Sa Pessoa)	4:48
9.	"Secret Roses"	Mari Fujita	Fujita, Day track	3:57
10.	"Wonderland"	Tomoo Kasahara, Yoko Blaqstone	Blaqstone	4:15
11.	"Be With U"	Tokunaga	Cybersound (Michael Africk, Perry Geyer, Miguel Sa Pessoa)	4:58
12.	"Over The Rainbow"	Harold Arlen	Hiroyuki Kubota, Hideyuki Terachi	4:33
Total length:				49:22

== Charts ==
Chart (2008)	Peak position
Japan Oricon Daily Albums Chart	6
Japan Oricon Weekly Albums Chart	14
Japan Oricon Monthly Albums Chart	18
Japan Oricon Yearly Albums Chart	117

== Certifications ==
Country	Provider	Sales	Certification (sales thresholds)
Japan	RIAJ	89,017	Gold

== Release history ==
Region	Date	Label	Format
Japan	January 1, 2008	Northern Music	CD
Taiwan	January 2, 2008	Forward Music	CD
Korea	January 15, 2008	C&L Music	CD
