= Can't Forget Your Love/Perfect Crime =

"Can't Forget Your Love/Perfect Crime: Single Edit"

Single by Mai Kuraki

from the album Perfect Crime Fairy Tale
- Released: August 18, 2001
- Recorded: 2001
- Genre: J-pop
- Label: Giza Studio
- Songwriters: Mai Kuraki; Aika Ohno; Cybersound; (Michael Africk, Perry Geyer, Miguel Sa Pessoa) Akihito Tokunaga; Daisuke Ikeda
- Producer: KANONJI

Mai Kuraki singles chronology
| "Always" (2000) | "Can't Forget Your Love/Perfect Crime: Single Edit" (2001) | "Winter Bells" (2001) |

"Can't Forget Your Love/Perfect Crime: Single Edit" is a double A-side single by Japanese singer songwriter Mai Kuraki, taken from her second studio album Perfect Crime (2001) and third studio album Fairy Tale (2002). It was released on August 29, 2001, by Giza Studio, and both songs were served as the theme song to the Japanese television series Ikiru tame no Jonetsu toshite no Satsujin. "Can't Forget Your Love" was written by Kuraki herself, Aika Ohno, Cybersound and Akihito Tokunaga, while "Perfect Crime: Single Edit" was written by Kuraki, Tokunaga, Daisuke Ikeda.

== Commercial performance ==
Commercially, "Can't Forget Your Love/Perfect Crime: Single Edit" was a moderate success. Although the single instantly peaked at number two on the Oricon Weekly Singles Chart, it has managed to sold 180,040 copies as of February 2018, 30,000 copies fewer than her preceding single "Always". It spent eight weeks on the chart and became the 113th best-selling single of 2001 in Japan and has been certificated gold by Recording Industry Association of Japan (RIAJ).

== Track listing ==
CD
| No. | Title | Writer(s) | Arranger(s) | Length |
|---|---|---|---|---|
| 1. | "Can't forget your love" | Mai Kuraki; Aika Ohno | Cybersound; (Michael Africk, Perry Geyer, Miguel Sa Pessoa) Akihito Tokunaga | 5:27 |
| 2. | "Perfect Crime" (Single Edit) | Kuraki; Tokunaga | Tokunaga; Daisuke Ikeda (string arrangement) | 5:41 |
| 3. | "Perfect Crime" (DJ Me-Ya Urban Beat Box Remix) | Kuraki; Tokunaga | DJ Me-Ya | 5:12 |
| 4. | "Can't Forget Your Love" (Instrumental) | Ohno | Cybersound; (Michael Africk, Perry Geyer, Miguel Sa Pessoa); Tokunaga | 5:27 |
| 5. | "Perfect Crime" (Single Edit / Instrumental) | Tokunaga | Tokunaga; Ikeda | 5:41 |

== Credits and personnel ==
Credits and personnel adapted by the CD liner notes.

- Mai Kuraki – vocals, background vocals, songwriting
- Aika Ohno - songwriting
- Akihito Tokunaga - songwriting, arrangement, backing vocals
- Cybersound (Michael Africk, Perry Geyer, Miguel Sa Pessoa) - arrangement
- Daisuke Ikeda - string arrangement
- Michael Africk - backing vocals
- Maho Furukawa - backing vocals
- Tama Music - strings
- Mist a Sista - backing vocals
- DJ Me-Ya - remix
- Tokiko Nishimuro - director
- KANONJI - producer

== Charts ==
=== Weekly charts ===
| Chart (2001) | Peak position |
|---|---|
| Japan (Oricon) | 2 |

=== Year-end charts ===
| Chart (2001) | Peak position |
|---|---|
| Japan (Oricon) | 113 |

== Certification and sales ==
| Region | Certification | Certified units/sales |
|---|---|---|
| Japan (RIAJ) | Gold | 180,040 (physical sales) |

== Release history ==
| Region | Date | Format | Label | Ref. |
|---|---|---|---|---|
| Japan | August 18, 2001 | CD single | Giza Studio | |
