= P.S My Sunshine =

Single by Mai Kuraki

from the album Fuse of Love
- Released: June 1, 2005
- Genre: J-pop
- Length: 3:51
- Label: Giza Studio
- Songwriter(s): Hitoshi Okamoto; Mai Kuraki
- Producer(s): Kannonji

Mai Kuraki singles chronology
"Dancing" (2005)	"P.S My Sunshine" (2005)	"Growing of My Heart" (2005)

"P.S My Sunshine" (stylized as "P.S♡MY SUNSHINE") a song by Japanese singer-songwriter Mai Kuraki from her fifth Fuse of Love (2005). The song was written by Kuraki and Hitoshi Okamoto, and produced by Kuraki herself and Kannonji. The song served as the seasonal theme song to Mezamashi Saturday. The single was released on 1 June 2005 through Giza Studio as the third single from Fuse of Love.

"P.S My Sunshine" is a J-pop track with a teen pop element, arranged by its composer, Hitoshi Okamoto. The single peaked at number eight in Japan and became Kuraki's twenty-first consecutive number ten single.

== Track listing ==
All lyrics are written by Mai Kuraki

CD single
No.	Title	Writer(s)	Arranger(s)	Length
1.	"P.S My Sunshine"	Mai Kuraki; Hitoshi Okamoto	Okamoto	3:51
2.	"Tell Me Your Way"	Kuraki; Koji Goto	Goto	3:39
3.	"P.S My Sunshine" (Day Track Version)	Kuraki; Okamoto	Yuki Nakano	4:38
Total length:				12:08

== Charts ==
=== Daily charts ===
Chart (2005)	Peak position
Japan (Oricon)	3

=== Weekly charts ===
Chart (2005)	Peak position
Japan (Oricon)	8

=== Monthly charts ===
Chart (2005)	Peak position
Japan (Oricon)	12

== Certification and sales ==
Region	Certification	Certified units/sales
Japan (RIAJ)	None	41,936 (CD)
