= Fuse of Love =

Studio album by Mai Kuraki
- Released: August 24, 2005
- Recorded: 2004–2005
- Genre: Pop, R&B
- Length: 48:26
- Label: Giza Studio
- Producer: Mai Kuraki, Kanonji

Mai Kuraki chronology
Wish You the Best (2004)	Fuse of Love (2005)	Diamond Wave (2006)

Singles from Fuse of Love
- 1. "Ashita e Kakeru Hashi" Released: May 19, 2004; 2. "Love, Needing" Released: January 26, 2005; 3. "Dancing" Released: March 23, 2005; 4. "P.S My Sunshine" Released: June 1, 2005

Fuse of Love is the fifth studio album by Japanese recording artist Mai Kuraki. It was released on August 24, 2005, over two years after If I Believe.

== Background ==
This album is the first to be produced by Kuraki herself.

Nearly five years after its release, the song "Chance for You" was chosen to be the theme song for the movie Soft Boy and a re-arranged "Cinema Version" was digitally released on June 16, 2010.

== Commercial performance ==
Fuse of Love debuted at #3 with 108,269 copies sold making it Kuraki's first album to not open/peak at number-one on the Oricon albums chart. The album stayed in the top 10 for two weeks and charted for a total of 13 weeks. Fuse of Love was the 81st best selling album of 2005.

== Track listing ==
All lyrics are written by Mai Kuraki

No.	Title	Music	Arranger(s)	Length
1.	"Honey, Feeling for Me"	Aika Ohno	Shingo Kamata	4:08
2.	"P.S My Sunshine"	Hitoshi Okamoto (from Garnet Crow)	Okamoto	3:50
3.	"You look at me~one"	Yoshinobu Ohga (from OOM)	Ohga	3:59
4.	"Kakenukeru Inazuma" (駆け抜ける稲妻 "Lightning Passing By")	Ohga	Ohga	5:01
5.	"Don't Leave Me Alone"	Ohga	Ohga	4:55
6.	"Love, Needing"	Ohno	Hiroshi Asai (from The Tambourines)	3:18
7.	"Dancing"	Akihito Tokunaga (from doa)	Tokunaga	3:48
8.	"Tell Me What"	Ohno	Okamoto	3:51
9.	"Love Sick"	Ohno	Ohga	4:07
10.	"Ashita e Kakeru Hashi"	Tokunaga	Daisuke Ikeda, Tokunaga	4:00
11.	"I Sing a Song for You"	Ohno	Piano arrangement: Ohno	3:53
12.	"Chance for You"	Ohno	Asai	3:31
Total length:				48:26

== Charts ==
Chart (2005)	Peak position
Japan Oricon Daily Albums Chart	1
Japan Oricon Weekly Albums Chart	3
Japan Oricon Monthly Albums Chart	3
Japan Oricon Yearly Albums Chart	81

== Certifications ==
Country	Provider	Sales	Certification (sales thresholds)
Japan	RIAJ	185,350	Gold
