= Ashita e Kakeru Hashi =

Single by Mai Kuraki

from the album Fuse of Love
- Released: May 19, 2004
- Genre: J-pop
- Label: Giza Studio
- Songwriter(s): Mai Kuraki, Akihito Tokunaga

Mai Kuraki singles chronology
"Kaze no La La La" (2003)	"Ashita e Kakeru Hashi" (2004)	"Love, Needing" (2004)

"Ashita e Kakeru Hashi"(明日へ架ける橋) is Mai Kuraki's 18th single, released on May 19, 2004

== Track listing ==
All lyrics are written by Mai Kuraki.

CD
No.	Title	Length
1.	"Ashita e Kakeru Hashi(明日へ架ける橋)"
2.	"Lover Boy"
3.	"Ai O Motto(愛をもっと)"
4.	"Ashita e Kakeru Hashi(明日へ架ける橋) (Instrumental)"

== Charts ==
=== Oricon Sales Chart ===
Release	Chart	Peak Position	First Day/Week Sales	Sales Total	Chart Run
May 19, 2004	Oricon Daily Singles Chart				
May 19, 2004	Oricon Weekly Singles Chart	3	51,215	90,588	16 weeks
May 19, 2004	Oricon Monthly Singles Chart				
May 19, 2004	Oricon Yearly Singles Chart				
