= Yume ga Saku Haru/You and Music and Dream =

Single by Mai Kuraki

from the album Touch Me!
- Released: March 19, 2008
- Recorded: 2008
- Genre: J-pop
- Label: Northern Music
- Songwriter: Mai Kuraki

Mai Kuraki singles chronology
"Silent Love (Open My Heart)/Be With U" (2007)	"Yume ga Saku Haru/You and Music and Dream" (2008)	"Ichibyōgoto ni Love for You" (2008)

"Yume ga Saku Haru/You and Music and Dream" (夢が咲く春/You and Music and Dream; lit. Spring Of Blooming Dreams/You and Music and Dream) is Mai Kuraki's twenty-eighth single, released on March 19, 2008. It was released in both limited and regular editions. The limited edition comes with an Eco bag (in natural, pink or green colors) as well as a bonus instrumental piano version of "You and Music and Dream". This single is her first to have two different covers.

== Usage in media ==
- NTV "The 4400 Season 1 Michi kara no Seikansha" theme song (#1) NTV link
- TBS "Chikyuu Sousei Mystery Mother Planet Kiseki no Shima, Galapagos "Inochi" no Isan" image song (#2)

== Track listing ==
All lyrics are written by Mai Kuraki.

Limited Edition
No.	Title	Length
1.	"Yume ga Saku Haru (夢が咲く春, Spring of Blooming Dreams)"	3:54
2.	"You and Music and Dream"	4:03
3.	"You and Music and Dream: Another Ver."	2:49
4.	"Yume ga Saku Haru: Instrumental"	3:58
5.	"You and Music and Dream: Instrumental"	4:05

All lyrics are written by Mai Kuraki.

Regular Edition
No.	Title	Length
1.	"Yume ga Saku Haru"	3:54
2.	"You and Music and Dream"	4:03
3.	"Yume ga Saku Haru: Instrumental"	3:58
4.	"You and Music and Dream: Instrumental"	4:05

== Charts ==
=== Oricon Sales Chart ===
Release date	Chart	Peak position	First week sales	Sales total
March 19, 2008	Oricon Daily Singles Chart	2		28,881
March 19, 2008	Oricon Weekly Singles Chart	5	20,398	28,881
March 19, 2008	Oricon Yearly Singles Chart	256		28,881

=== Billboard Japan Sales Chart ===
Release	Chart	Peak position
March 19, 2008	Billboard Japan Hot 100	12
March 19, 2008	Billboard Japan Hot Singles Sales	7
