= Silent Love (Open My Heart)/Be with U =

"Silent Love (Open My Heart)/Be With U"

Single by Mai Kuraki

from the album One Life
- Released: November 28, 2007
- Recorded: 2007
- Genre: J-Pop
- Length: 4:24; 4:56
- Label: Northern Music
- Songwriters: Mai Kuraki; Daisuke Miyachi; Yuichi Ohno; Akihito Tokunaga; Cybersound; (Michael Africk, Perry Geyer, Miguel Sa Pessoa)
- Producer: Kannonji

Mai Kuraki singles chronology
"Season of love" (2007)	"Silent Love (Open My Heart)/Be With U" (2007)	"Yume ga Saku Haru/You and Music and Dream" (2008)

"Silent Love (Open My Heart)/Be With U" is Mai Kuraki's twenty-seventh single, released on November 28, 2007. It is Kuraki's first double A-side single in 6 years as well as her first single to be released in both limited and regular editions. The single was originally scheduled to drop on November 21 but was postponed by a week (a first for Kuraki) due to circumstances unrelated to production. The initial cover was also replaced a month before its release.

== Usage in media ==
- NC Japan gamesoft "Lineage II First Throne Arata na Shuzoku Kamael" image song (#1)

== Track listing ==
All lyrics are written by Mai Kuraki.

CD
No.	Title	Length
1.	"Silent Love: Open My Heart"	4:24
2.	"Be With U"	4:56
3.	"Silent Love: Open My Heart Instrumental"	4:27
4.	"Be With U: Instrumental"	4:54

Limited Edition DVD
No.	Title	Length
1.	"Feel Fine!: Acoustic Live Ver."

== Charts ==
=== Oricon Sales Chart ===
Release	Chart	Peak position	First week sales	Sales total	Chart run
November 28, 2007	Oricon Daily Singles Chart	5			
November 28, 2007	Oricon Weekly Singles Chart	9	21,969	30,625	6 weeks
November 28, 2007	Oricon Monthly Singles Chart				
November 28, 2007	Oricon Yearly Singles Chart				
