= Time After Time (Hana Mau Machi de) =

Single by Mai Kuraki

from the album If I Believe
- B-side: "Natural"
- Released: March 5, 2003
- Genre: J-pop
- Label: Giza Studio
- Songwriters: Mai Kuraki; Aika Ohno; Cybersound; (Michael Africk, Perry Geyer, Miguel Sa Pessoa)
- Producer: KANONJI

Mai Kuraki singles chronology
"Make My Day" (2002)	"Time After Time (Hana Mau Machi de)" (2003)	"Kiss" (2003)

"Time After Time (Hana Mau Machi de)" (Time After Time (花舞う街で), Time After Time (In the Street of Dancing Flowers)) is a song by Japanese singer songwriter Mai Kuraki, taken from her fourth studio album If I Believe (2003). It was released on March 5, 2003, by Giza Studio. The song was written by Kuraki herself and Aika Ohno, while the production was done by Cybersound (Michael Africk, Perry Geyer, Miguel Sa Pessoa). It was served as the theme song to the 2003 Japanese animation movie, Detective Conan: Crossroad in the Ancient Capital.

The writer of "Time After Time (Hana Mau Machi de)", Aika Ohno, covered the song on her cover third studio album Silent Passage.

== Track listing ==
CD single
No.	Title	Writer(s)	Length
1.	"Time After Time (Hana Mau Machi de)"	Mai Kuraki; Aika Ohno; Cybersound; (Michael Africk, Perry Geyer, Miguel Sa Pessoa)	4:04
2.	"Natural"	Kuraki; Ohno; Cybersound; (Michael Africk, Perry Geyer, Miguel Sa Pessoa)	4:30
3.	"Time After Time (Hana Mau Machi de)" (Instrumental)	Kuraki; Ohno; Cybersound; (Michael Africk, Perry Geyer, Miguel Sa Pessoa)	4:02
Total length:			12:36

== Charts ==
=== Weekly charts ===
Chart (2003–2017)	Peak position
Japan (Oricon)	3
Japan (Japan Hot 100)	100

=== Monthly charts ===
Chart (2003)	Peak position
Japan (Oricon)	11

=== Year-end charts ===
Chart (2003)	Position
Japan (Oricon)	67

== Certifications ==
Region	Certification	Certified units/sales
Japan (RIAJ)	Gold	200,000^{^}
^{^} Shipments figures based on certification alone.
