= Maki Ohguro discography =

- Studio albums: 16
- Compilation albums: 7
- Singles: 37
- Video albums: 5
- Promotional singles: 26

The discography of Maki Ohguro, a Japanese J-pop singer and songwriter, consists of 16 studio albums and 37 singles.

== Albums ==
=== Studio albums ===
List of albums, with selected chart positions
Title	Album details	Peak positions		Sales (JPN)	Certifications
Title	Album details	JPN Oricon	JPN Billboard	Sales (JPN)	Certifications
Stop Motion	Released: June 24, 1992; Label: B-Gram; Format(s): CD, digital download	58	—	9,000	
Da Da Da	Released: April 28, 1993; Label: B-Gram; Format(s): CD, digital download	2	—	746,000	RIAJ: Million
U.Be Love	Released: November 10, 1993; Label: B-Gram; Format(s): CD, digital download	2	—	540,000	RIAJ: 2×Platinum
Eien no Yume ni Mukatte (永遠の夢に向かって)	Released: November 9, 1994; Label: B-Gram; Format(s): CD, digital download	1	—	1,583,000	RIAJ: 4×Platinum
La.La.La	Released: July 19, 1995; Label: B-Gram; Format(s): CD, digital download	1	—	1,618,000	RIAJ: 4×Platinum
Power of Dreams	Released: August 6, 1997; Label: B-Gram; Format(s): CD, cassette, digital download	1	—	1,755,000	RIAJ: 2×Million
Mother Earth	Released: September 9, 1998; Label: B-Gram; Format(s): CD, digital download	1	—	714,000	RIAJ: 2×Platinum
O	Released: December 12, 2001; Label: EMI Japan; Format(s): CD, digital download	8	—	89,000	
Presents	Released: December 11, 2002; Label: EMI Japan; Format(s): CD, digital download	18	—	28,000	
Rhythm Black	Released: June 25, 2003; Label: EMI Japan; Format(s): CD, digital download	20	—	39,000	
Happiness	Released: June 22, 2005; Label: EMI Japan; Format(s): CD, digital download	28	—	21,000	
Positive Spiral	Released: January 30, 2008; Label: EMI Japan; Format(s): CD, CD+DVD, digital download	39	—	9,000	
Suppin	Released: August 25, 2010; Label: 32; Format(s): CD, CD+DVD, digital download	29	—	7,000	
Music Muscle	Released: December 5, 2018; Label: Being; Format(s): CD, CD+DVD, digital download	30	57	5,000	
Phoenix	Released: December 23, 2020; Label: Being; Format(s): CD, CD+DVD, digital download	51	—	2,000	
55 Black	Released: August 2, 2025; Label: B Zone; Format(s): CD, digital download	18	—	2,133	
"—" denotes items which were released before the creation of the G-Music or Gaon Charts, or items that did not chart.

=== Compilation albums ===
List of albums, with selected chart positions
Title	Album details	Peak positions		Sales (JPN)	Certifications
Title	Album details	JPN Oricon	JPN Billboard	Sales (JPN)	Certifications
Back Beats #1	Released: December 11, 1995; Label: B-Gram; Format(s): CD, digital download	1	—	2,868,000	RIAJ: 3×Million
Maki Ohguro Best of Best ~All Singles Collection~	Released: December 31, 1999; Label: B-Gram; Format(s): CD, digital download	2	—	890,000	RIAJ: 2×Platinum
Complete of Maki Ohguro at the Being Studio	Released: July 25, 2003; Label: B-Gram; Format(s): CD, digital download	60	—	18,000	
Weep ~Maki Ohguro the Best Ballads Collection~	Released: March 15, 2006; Label: EMI Japan; Format(s): CD, digital download	30	—	14,000	
Luxury 22-24pm	Released: February 4, 2009; Label: Cam; Format(s): CD, digital download	29	—	9,000	
Golden Best Maki Ohguro	Released: November 23, 2011; Label: 32; Format(s): CD, digital download	—	—		
Greatest Hits 1991-2016 ~All Singles +~	Released: November 23, 2016; Label: B-Gram; Format(s): CD, digital download	4	12	40,000	
BACK BEATs #30th Anniversary: SPARKLE	Released: December 14, 2022; Label: B One; Format(s): CD, digital download	6		-	
"—" denotes items which were released before the creation of the G-Music or Gaon Charts, or items that did not chart.

BACK BEATs #30th Anniversary -SPARKLE-

=== Cover albums ===
List of albums, with selected chart positions
Title	Album details	Peak positions		Sales (JPN)	Certifications
Title	Album details	JPN Oricon	JPN Billboard	Sales (JPN)	Certifications
Copy Band Generation Vol.1	Released: March 17, 2004; Label: EMI Japan; Format(s): CD, digital download	23	—	23,000	
D-Project with Zard	Released: May 18, 2016; Label: Giza Studio; Format(s): CD	33	—	3,000	
"—" denotes items which were released before the creation of the G-Music or Gaon Charts, or items that did not chart.

=== Reissue albums ===
List of albums, with selected chart positions
Title	Album details	Peak positions		Sales (JPN)	Certifications
Title	Album details	JPN Oricon	JPN Billboard	Sales (JPN)	Certifications
Luxury 22-24pm & 4 You	Released: December 20, 2017; Label: EMI Japan; Format(s): CD, digital download	88	—	2,000	
"—" denotes items which were released before the creation of the G-Music or Gaon Charts, or items that did not chart.

List of albums, with selected chart positions
Title	Album details	Peak positions
Title	Album details	JPN Oricon
Maki Ohguro Live Beats	Released: August 1, 2000; Label: B-Vision; Format(s): DVD, VHS	1
Live Nature #0 ~Nice to Meet You!~	Released: June 27, 2001; Label: B-Vision; Format(s): DVD, VHS	28
Live Nature #2 ~Best Beats~	Released: July 30, 2001; Label: B-Vision; Format(s): DVD, VHS	—
Live Nature #3 Special ~Rain or Shine~	Released: October 31, 2001; Label: B-Vision; Format(s): DVD, VHS	49
Copy Band Generation Live Vol. 1	Released: September 29, 2004; Label: EMI Japan; Format(s): DVD, VHS	120
Maki Ohguro Live Bomb!! Level.6 15th Anniversary Super Final in Pacifico Yokohama ~My Music My Life~	Released: February 4, 2009; Label: CAM; Format(s): DVD	60
"—" denotes items which were released before the creation of the G-Music or Gaon Charts, or items that did not chart.

== Singles ==
=== As lead artist ===
List of singles, with selected chart positions
Title	Year	Peak chart positions		Sales	Certifications	Album
Title	Year	JPN Oricon	JPN Hot 100	Sales	Certifications	Album
"Stop Motion"	1992	67	—	19,000		Stop Motion
"Da.Ka.Ra"	1992	2	—	1,055,000	RIAJ: 2×Platinum	Da Da Da
"Chotto" (チョット)	1993	4	—	840,000	RIAJ: 2×Platinum	Da Da Da
"Wakaremashou Watashi kara Kiemashou Anata kara" (別れましょう私から消えましょうあなたから)	1993	3	—	667,000	RIAJ: Platinum	U.Be Love
"Harlem Night"	1993	3	—	396,000	RIAJ: Platinum	U.Be Love
"Jonetsu wa Nemuranai" (憂鬱は眠らない) (with Tetsuro Oda)	1993	18	—	116,000	RIAJ: Gold	Non-album single
"Anata Dake Mitsumeteru" (あなただけ見つめてる)	1993	2	—	1,236,000	RIAJ: 3×Platinum	Eien no Yume ni Mukatte
"Shiroi Graduation" (白いGradation)	1994	5	—	485,000	RIAJ: Platinum	Eien no Yume ni Mukatte
"Natsu ga Kuru" (夏が来る)	1994	2	—	971,000	RIAJ: 2×Platinum	Eien no Yume ni Mukatte
"Eien no Yume ni Mukatte" (永遠の夢に向かって)	1994	1	—	794,000	RIAJ: Platinum	Eien no Yume ni Mukatte
"La.La.La" (ら・ら・ら)	1995	1	—	1,339,000	RIAJ: 3×Platinum	La.La.La
"Ichiban Chikaku ni Ite ne" (いちばん近くにいてね)	1995	2	—	867,000	RIAJ: 2×Platinum	La.La.La
"Aishitemasu" (愛してます)	1995	2	—	464,000	RIAJ: Platinum	Back Beats #1
"Aah" (あぁ)	1996	2	—	443,000	RIAJ: Platinum	Power of Dreams
"Atsuku Nare" (熱くなれ)	1996	1	—	834,000	RIAJ: 2×Platinum	Power of Dreams
"Unbalance" (アンバランス)	1996	4	—	321,000	RIAJ: Platinum	Power of Dreams
"Genki Dashite" (ゲンキダシテ)	1997	5	—	207,000	RIAJ: Platinum	Power of Dreams
"Sora" (空)	1997	4	—	214,000	RIAJ: Gold	Power of Dreams
"Ne! ~Onna, Jounetsu~" (ネッ!〜女、情熱〜)	1998	5	—	147,000	RIAJ: Gold	Mother Eath
"Taiyou no Kuni he Ikouyo Suguni ~Sora Tobu Yume ni Notte~" (太陽の国へ行こうよ すぐに〜空飛ぶ夢に乗って〜)	1999	19	—	64,000	RIAJ: Gold	Maki Ohguro Best of Best ~All Singles Collection~
"Yume nara Sameteyo" (夢なら醒めてよ)	1999	10	—	66,000		Maki Ohguro Best of Best ~All Singles Collection~
"Niji wo Koete" (虹ヲコエテ)	2001	12	—	56,000		O
"Yuki ga Furu Mae ni" (雪が降るまえに)	2001	18	—	27,000		O
"Identity" (アイデンティティ)	2002	27	—	20,000		Rhythm Black
"Katte ni Kimenaide yo" (勝手に決めないでよ)	2003	43	—	6,000		Rhythm Black
"Natsu ga Kuru, Soshite..." (夏が来る、そして...)	2003	35	—	10,000		Rhythm Black
"Itoshii Hito he ~Merry Christmas~" (いとしいひとへ～Merry Christmas～)	2003	51	—	6,000		Weep ~Maki Ohguro the Best Ballads Collection~
"Asahi ~Shine & Groove~"	2004	55	—	6,000		Happiness
"Over Top"	2005	87	—	3,000		Happiness
"Kochou no Yume" (胡蝶の夢)	2006	56	—	6,000		Weep ~Maki Ohguro the Best Ballads Collection~
"Kore de ii no?!" (コレデイイノ?!)	2007	60	—	2,000		Positive Spiral
"Koi no Akuma -She's no Angel-" (恋の悪魔 -She's no Angel-)	2007	60	—	2,000		Positive Spiral
"It's All Right"	2010	95	99	1,000		Suppin
"Anything Goes!"	2010	7	19	70,000		Greatest Hits 1991-2016 ~All Singles +~
"Anything Goes! "Ballad""	2011	36	—	5,000		Greatest Hits 1991-2016 ~All Singles +~
"Lie, Lie, Lie"	2017	20	71	3,000		Music Muscle
"—" denotes items which were released before the creation of the G-Music or Billboard charts, or items that did not chart.

=== As featured artist ===
Title	Year	Peak chart positions		Sales	Album
Title	Year	JPN Oricon	JPN Hot 100	Sales	Album
"Deep Blue" (DJ Yutaka featuring Maki Ohguro)	2003	—	—		Episode I
"Ame nochi Nijiiro" (雨のち虹色) (The Loose Dogs featuring Maki Ohguro)	2008	55	85		Life Size
"Music Flower" (Tsuchiya Kouhei featuring Tomiko Van, Maki Ohguro, Mika Nakashima, Rinko Urashima, Nadia Shimazu, Katteni-Shiyagare and DJ Hasebe)	2008	115	—		Get Stoned
"Heart Breaker" (As a part of DaiKichi)	2010	9	64	16,000	Non-album singles
"Restart" (As a part of Restart Japan with Tube)	2011	8	25	47,000	Non-album singles
"Watashitachi no Michi" (私たちの道) (As a part of One Hokkaido Project)	2019	89	—		Non-album singles
"—" denotes a recording that did not chart or was not released in that territory.

=== Promotional singles ===
List of singles, with selected chart positions
Title	Year	Album
"Kaze ni Nare" (風になれ)	1996	Power of Dreams
"Make a Wish"	2008	Greatest Hits 1991-2016 ~All Singles +~
"Our Home"	2008	Suppin
"Saigo no Love Letter" (最後のラブレター)	2009	Suppin
"Higher Higher"	2016	Greatest Hits 1991-2016 ~All Singles +~
"Latitude ~Ashita ga kuru kara~" (latitude ～明日が来るから～)	2017	Music Muscle
"Zoom Up" (with Boooze)	2017	Music Muscle
"Because... You"	2018	Music Muscle
"Crash & Rush" (featuring Doa)	2018	Music Muscle
"Spot Light"	2018	Music Muscle
"Onna wa Tsuraiyo." (女はつらいよ。)	2018	Music Muscle
"Oyagokoro Blues" (親心ブルース)	2018	Music Muscle
"Harmony"	2018	Music Muscle
"Love Muscle"	2018	Music Muscle
"Santa Run Run Run" (サンタラン Run♪Run♪)	2019	Non-album single
"Sharely Christmas" (with Santa Run Kids)	2019	Non-album single
"Let's Go! Girls"	2020	Phoenix
"Rainbow Quest ~Bokura wa Peace Mate~" (with Rainbow Kids) (RAINBOW QUEST ～僕らはピース☮メイト～)	2020	Phoenix
"OK"	2020	Phoenix
"Shaka Shaka You'll Be All Rigtht" (featuring Hane Gumi 2020) (Shaka♬シャカ You'll be all right)	2020	Phoenix
"Get Your Wave" (featuring Yuichi Ikuzawa, Akihito Tokunaga, Taishi Uehara, Marty Friedman)	2020	Phoenix
"Dee Dee Dee Dee Deeper Love ~Koi no Social Distance~" (featuring Touma Rose) (Dee Dee Dee Dee Deeper Love ～恋のソーシャルディスタンス～)	2020	Phoenix
"Pray for You ~7 Gatsu no Élégie~" (Pray for you 〜7月のélégie〜)	2020	Phoenix
"Phoenix"	2020	Phoenix
"We are the Love ~Dedicated to J & L~"	2020	Phoenix
"Sister Sister Sister"	2020	Phoenix
"Tokyo Only Peace Voice Of Japan "Kids" with Ohguro Maki" (東京 Only Peace Voice Of Japan "Kids" with 大黒摩季)	2021	BACK BEATs #30th Anniversary: Sparkle
"Sparkle"	2022	BACK BEATs #30th Anniversary: Sparkle
"Sing"	2022	BACK BEATs #30th Anniversary: Sparkle
"Ima Soko ni Kimi ga Iru Ima Koko ni Boku ga Iru" (今そこに君がいる 今ここに僕がいる)	2022	BACK BEATs #30th Anniversary: Sparkle
"Kimi ni Todoke" feat.Doa, Kawashima Daria (君に届け feat, doa, 川島だりあ)	2022	BACK BEATs #30th Anniversary: Sparkle

== DVDs ==
Year	DVD details
2000	Maki Ohguro LIVE BEATs: Released: 2000/08/01; Label: B-Vision
2001	LIVE NATURE #0 ~Nice to meet you!~: Released: 2001/06/27; Label: B-Vision
2001	LIVE NATURE #3 Special Rain or Shine: Released: 2001/10/31; Label: B-Vision
2004	COPYBAND GENERATION LIVE VOL.1: Released: 2004/09/29; Label: EMI Japan
2009	Maki Ohguro Live Bomb!! Level.6 15th Anniversary Super Final in パシフィコ横浜 ～My Music My Life～: Released: 2009/02/04; Label: EMI Japan
