= Greatest Hits 1991–2016 ~ All Singles+ ~ =

Greatest hits album by Maki Ohguro
- Released: November 23, 2016
- Genre: J-Pop
- Length: Disc 1: 75:48; Disc 2: 74:12; Disc 3: 74:26
- Label: Being Inc.
- Producer: Maki Ohguro

Maki Ohguro chronology
Suppin (2010)	Greatest Hits 1991–2016 ~ All Singles+ ~ (2016)	Music Muscle (2018)

Greatest Hits 1991–2016 ~ All Singles+ ~ is the seventh compilation album by Japanese pop singer and songwriter Maki Ohguro. It was released on 23 November 2016 under Being Inc. label.

== Background ==
It was released to promote Maki's resumption of music activities after six years' hiatus. It is also the first album which was released under Being since 1999, when her second compilation album Maki Ohguro Best of Best ~All Singles Collection~ was released.

This album includes all remastered singles which had been released, selected tracks from studio albums, and two new songs - Higher Higher, which was released in August 2016 as a digital single; and My will -Sekai wa Kaerarenakutemo.

The release is divided into two versions. The regular edition (with CD code JBCZ-9035/7) contains three CDs. The first press limited edition (with CD code JBCZ-9038/41) contains five CDS; the fourth CD contains coupling songs from singles which were never released before and the fifth CD is a DVD which contains Maki Ohguro 90’s Music Video Collection.

== Chart performance ==
The album reached daily #2 and weekly #4 rank in first week. It charted for 20 weeks and sold more than 31,000 copies.

== Track listing ==
=== Disc 1 ===
All tracks arranged by Takeshi Hayama (expect track #1 and #2, by Masao Akashi)

All lyrics are written by Maki Ohguro; all music is composed by Maki Ohguro.

No.	Title	Length
1.	"Stay" (1st album "Stop Motion")	4:26
2.	"Stop Motion" (1st single)	3:39
3.	"DA・KA・RA" (2nd single)	3:23
4.	"Chotto (チョット)" (3rd single)	3:39
5.	"Kimi ni Aisareru Sono tame ni (君に愛されるそのために)" (3rd single's coupling song)	4:37
6.	"Wakaremashou Watashi kara Kieteshimau Anata kara (別れましょう私から消えましょうあなたから)" (4th single)	5:03
7.	"Harlem Night" (5th single)	4:09
8.	"Anata Dake Mitsumeteru (あなただけ見つめてる)" (6th single)	4:45
9.	"Shiroi Graduation (白いGradation)" (7th single)	3:53
10.	"Natsu ga Kuru (夏が来る)" (8th single)	4:46
11.	"Eien no Yume ni Mukatte (永遠の夢に向かって)" (9th single)	4:41
12.	"ROCKs" (4th album "Eien no Yume ni Mukatte")	5:25
13.	"Stay with me Baby" (4th album "Eien no Yume ni Mukatte")	4:04
14.	"La La La (ら・ら・ら)" (10th single)	4:27
15.	"Ichiban Chikaku ni Ite ne (いちばん近くにいてね)" (11th single)	4:52
16.	"Koi wa Merry Go Round (恋はメリーゴーランド)" (5th album "La La La")	4:33
17.	"Kodomo no Kuni he (子供の国へ)" (4th single's coupling song)	5:32

=== Disc 2 ===
All tracks arranged by Takeshi Hayama.

All lyrics are written by Maki Ohguro; all music is composed by Maki Ohguro (expect track #14, by Aika Ohno).

No.	Title	Length
1.	"Fire" (5th album "La La La")	4:26
2.	"Anata ga Ireba Sore Dake de Yokatta (あなたがいればそれだけでよかった)" (5th album "La La La")	5:21
3.	"Aishitemasu (愛してます)" (12th single)	4:51
4.	"Aah (あぁ)" (13th single)	4:31
5.	"Ganbaru Shikanai janai?! (ガンバルシカナイジャナイ？！)" (13th single's coupling song)	4:45
6.	"Atsuku Nare (熱くなれ)" (14th single)	3:43
7.	"Unbalance (アンバランス)" (15th single)	5:13
8.	"Genki Dashite (ゲンキダシテ)" (16th single)	5:00
9.	"You're not mine" (16th single's coupling song)	3:53
10.	"Sora (空)" (17th single)	4:47
11.	"Power of Dream" (6th album "Power of Dreams")	4:42
12.	"Kaze ni Nare (風になれ)" (6th album "Power of Dreams")	5:57
13.	"Ne! -Onna, Jounetsu- (ネッ! 〜女、情熱〜)" (18th single)	4:45
14.	"Taiyou no Kuni he Ikou yo Sugu ni -Sora Tobu Yume ni Notte- (太陽の国へ行こうよ すぐに〜空飛ぶ夢に乗って〜)" (19th single)	4:56
15.	"Yume nara Sameteyo (夢なら醒めてよ)" (20th single)	3:35
16.	"Niji wo Koete (虹ヲコエテ)" (21st single)	3:55

=== Disc 3 ===
All lyrics are written by Maki Ohguro; all music is composed by Maki Ohguro (expect track #12, by Tatsuo).

No.	Title	Arranger(s)	Length
1.	"Yuki ga Furu Mae ni (雪が降るまえに)" (22nd single)	Takeshi Hayama	6:16
2.	"Identity (アイデンティティ)" (23rd single)	Takao Konishi	4:53
3.	"Katte ni Kimenaide yo (勝手に決めないでよ)" (24th single)	Akira Nishihira	4:57
4.	"Natsu ga Kuru, Soshite... (夏が来る、そして…)" (25th single)	Nishihira	5:46
5.	"Itoshii Hito he -Merry Christmas- (いとしいひとへ〜Merry Christmas〜)" (26th single)	Satoshi Takebe	5:12
6.	"ASAHI〜SHINE&GROOVE〜" (27th single)	Akimitsu Honma	4:57
7.	"Over Top" (28th single)	Nishihira	5:30
8.	"Kochou no Yume (胡蝶の夢)" (29th single)	Nishihira	4:45
9.	"Kore de Ii no?! (コレデイイノ?!)" (30th single)	Takebe	5:53
10.	"Our Home" (2nd digital single)	Yohey	5:03
11.	"It's alright!" (31st single)	Yohey	6:18
12.	"Anything Goes" (32nd single)	Tatsuo	3:33
13.	"Take off -Sky Mark Cheer up ↗↗ ver.-" (from 13th album "Suppin")	Kei Kawano	5:37
14.	"Higher↗︎↗︎Higher↗︎↗︎" (4th digital single)	DJ YUTAKA, m.c.A・T	5:50
15.	"My Will -Sekai wa Kaerarenakutemo- (My Will 〜世界は変えられなくても〜)" (new song)	Akihito Tokunaga (Doa	5:18

== Usage in media ==
- "Stop Motion": theme song for TV Asahi drama "Onna Jiken Kisha Tachibana Keiko"
- "Chotto": opening theme for TV Asahi drama "Ichigo Hakusho"
- "Kimi ni Aisareru Sono tame ni": ending theme for TV Asahi program "Houdou Maruchi Channel"
- "Wakaremashou Watashi kara Kieteshimau Anata kara": theme song for TV Asahi drama "Neodrama"
- "Harlem Night": opening theme for Fuji TV program "Personal Watching Jab!"
- "Anata Dake Mitsumeteru": ending theme for TV Anime Slam Dunk
- "Natsu ga Kuru": opening theme for Tokyo Broadcasting System Television program "Count Down TV"
- "Eien no Yume ni Mukatte": opening theme for Tokyo Broadcasting System Television program "Count Down TV"
- "La La La": theme song for TV Asahi drama "Aji Ichi monme"
- "Koi wa Merry Go Round": theme song for TV Asahi program "CNN HEADLINE"
- "Aishitemasu": theme song for Fuji TV drama "Ninshin Desu yo" (2nd season)
- "Aa": theme song for TV Asahi drama "Aji Ichi monme"
- "Atsukunare": broadcast theme song for NHK program "Atlanta Olympics"
- "Sora": opening theme for TV anime Chūka Ichiban!
- "Taiyou no Kuni he Ikou yo Sugu ni -Sora Tobu Yume ni Notte": theme song for TV Asahi drama "New Caster Kasumi Reiko"
- "Yume nara Sameteyo": theme song for TV Asahi program "Kyouto Shimatsuya Jiken File"
- "Yuki ga Furu mae ni": theme song for Tokyo Broadcasting System Television program "Kochira Dai San bu Shakaibu"
- "Natsu ga Kuru, Soshite...": ending theme for Nihon TV program "Sport Uruguzu"
- "Kochou no Yume": theme song for Fuji TV drama "Shin Kaze no Rondo"
- "It's alright": ending theme for TV Asahi program "Pop! Step! Champoo!"
- "Anything Goes": theme song for program Kamen Rider OOO
- "My Will-Sekai wa Kaerarenakutemo-": theme song for TV Asahi drama "Kasouken no Onna"'s 16th season
