= Shinya (musician) =

Japanese musician (1970–2026)

Shinya 真矢
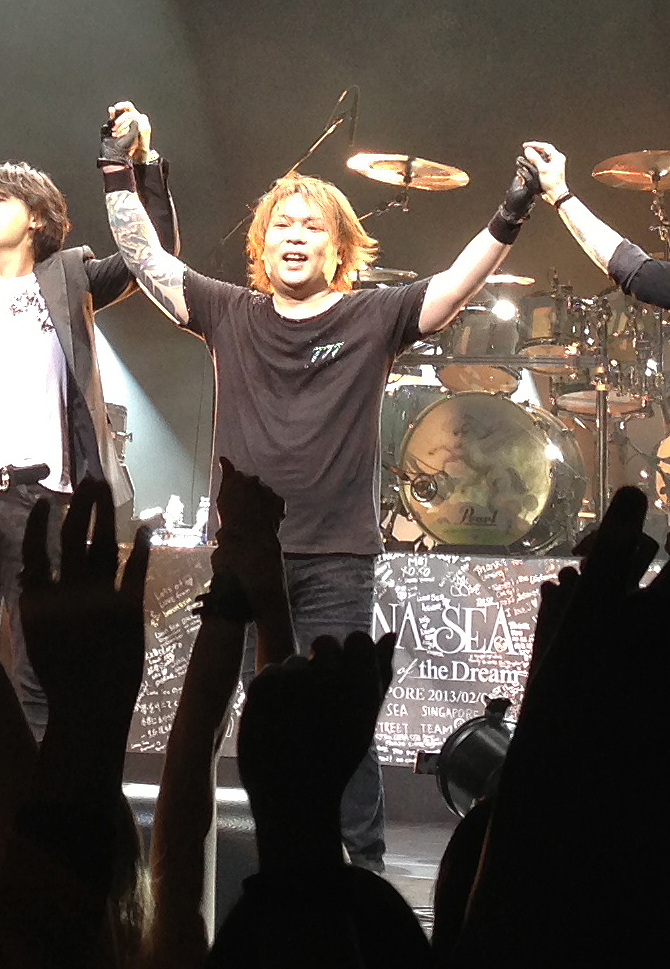
- Shinya in 2013

Background information
- Born: Shinya Yamada (山田 真矢); January 13, 1970; Hadano, Kanagawa, Japan
- Died: February 17, 2026 (aged 56)
- Genre: Rock
- Occupations: Musician; media personality; entrepreneur
- Instrument: Drums
- Years active: 1986–2026
- Label: Mercury
- Formerly of: Luna Sea; Maki Ohguro and Friends; Creature Creature; Toshi with T-Earth; Yellow Fried Chickenz
- Website: 331shinya.com

Shinya Yamada (Japanese: 山田 真矢, Hepburn: Yamada Shin'ya; January 13, 1970 – February 17, 2026) was a Japanese musician, media personality and businessman. He is best known as the drummer of the rock band Luna Sea from 1989 to their disbandment in 2000, and again from their 2010 reunion until his death from cancer in 2026.

He released the solo album No Sticks in 1997, and supported live or session work of other recording acts such as Maki Ohguro, Nanase Aikawa, Kyosuke Himuro, Sugizo, Creature Creature, Yellow Fried Chickenz, and D's Asagi. Luna Sea are regarded as one of the most influential bands in the visual kei scene. In addition to his former pupils Jun-ji (Siam Shade) and Satoyasu Shomura (Alexandros), musicians such as Pierre Nakano (Ling Tosite Sigure), Shinya (Dir En Grey), and Naoki (Deathgaze) have cited Shinya as an influence.

== Early life ==
Shinya was born in Hadano, Kanagawa, on January 13, 1970. He grew up in a family with two older brothers, an older sister, and a younger step-brother from his father's second marriage. His family were Noh performers, and Shinya was forced to practice the art from the age of three until sixth grade. He was also trained in the traditional Japanese taiko drums as a child. Shinya attended Shiritsu Honchō Kindergarten, Shiritsu Suehiro Elementary, Honchō Junior High, and Kanagawa Kenritsu Isehara High.

In high school, he became best friends with Sugizo, whose stage name Shinya originally coined as a nickname. Shinya was originally interested in motorcycles, but switched to drums at the age of 15 after seeing girls surrounding a band at a high school festival. He immediately asked his parents for a drum set and, believing it better than a motorcycle, they bought him a used one. He was able to play 8- and 16-beats simply by imitating what he saw on television. However, Shinya said the used kit was not enough and he soon went to a store to buy his first real kit. Coincidentally, Sugizo was at the music store in Ochanomizu and helped him make his selection. Already determined to become a professional musician, he successfully convinced his parents to take out a loan for the expensive drum kit.

== Career ==
In their second year of high school, Shinya and Sugizo formed the power metal band Pinocchio. They were then briefly both in Kashmir. When Shinya was asked to join Lunacy on January 16, 1989, he insisted that Sugizo also join. In 1991, the band changed their name to Luna Sea and released their self-titled first album. They went on to become very successful, having sold more than 10 million certified units in Japan, and are considered one of the most influential bands in the visual kei movement. In 2003, HMV Japan ranked Luna Sea at number 90 on their list of the 100 most important Japanese pop acts.

When Luna Sea took a brief break in 1997, Shinya started a solo career where he was vocalist and drummer. His first single, "Rakkasuru Taiyō", was released by Mercury Music Entertainment on September 26. It was written and produced by Yasushi Akimoto, and composed by Tsugutoshi Gotō. For his next song, the drummer wanted to perform a duet. Hekiru Shiina was offered the job as she and Shinya were both hosts at the Japan FM Network radio program Deeper Street. Two versions of the resulting single, "Hyoryusya", were released on November 21; one by Mercury and the other by Sony. Shinya's first album No Sticks was released on December 10, 1997, and produced by Akimoto. Shinya played drums on the track "Back Line Best" for his fellow Luna Sea bandmate J's 1997 debut solo album Pyromania, and on Tak Matsumoto's 1999 song "Go Further", which also features Billy Sheehan. He also contributed to tribute albums to the recording artists Hideki Saijo, Cozy Powell, John Bonham, and Rainbow. After Luna Sea disbanded in 2000, Shinya worked as support drummer for musicians such as Miyavi, Nanase Aikawa, Kyosuke Himuro, and numerous others. He formed an independent record label, True Colored, and produced the rock band Toranoko Trash. When asked why he started the label, Shinya explained that money is the biggest obstacle for indie artists, such as forcing them to compromise their recordings due to the cost of studio time, so he wanted to give them the freedom to pursue their sound to their satisfaction. For example, he allowed Toranoko Trash to record in his home studio as long as they needed. He also occasionally taught drums to students at the Osaka School of Music.

In 2002, Shinya was recruited by Satoshi Takebe to be part of a backing band for pop singer Maki Ohguro. With a lineup that also included The Street Sliders guitarist Kouhei Tsuchiya and Judy and Mary bassist Yoshihito Onda, they released the cover album Copy Band Generation Vol. 1 on March 17, 2004, under the name Maki Ohguro and Friends (大黒摩季とフレンズ, Ōguro Maki to Furenzu). In 2003, Shinya held an audition for a female singer. Okinawa native Milky was selected from more than 300 applicants, and the duo made their live debut as Potbelly that April at the Heaven's Party Scene 1 event that the drummer produced at Shinjuku LiquidRoom. Two years later, they released the album Crash! Crash! Crash! on August 22, 2005, through Nippon Crown. Produced by Shinya, it also features Hide with Spread Beaver bassist Chirolyn, Siam Shade guitarist Daita, and Wands guitarist Hiroshi Shibasaki. In 2006, Shinya collaborated with his fellow Luna Sea member Inoran's band Fake? for the song "Disco" on their mini-album Songs From Beelzebub. Also in 2006, he became a support drummer for Morrie's project, Creature Creature, and teamed up with La'cryma Christi drummer Levin for several exhibitions in celebration of the 60th anniversary of Pearl Drums.

Maki Ohguro and Friends temporarily reunited for a tour in October 2007. On December 24, 2007, Shinya reunited with Luna Sea to play a one-night only concert at the sold-out 55,000 seat Tokyo Dome. The band would reunite once again at the Hide Memorial Summit on May 4, 2008. From 2008 to 2009, Shinya was support drummer for X Japan vocalist Toshi's project, Toshi with T-Earth. Shinya opened Re:soul, a jewellery shop specializing in healing stones, in Daikanyamachō on April 23, 2008. In 2009, he began "producing" the Tokyo ramen shop Tenraiken (天雷軒). At the time of his death, they had two locations; one in Yotsuya and one in Kōjimachi.

Also in 2009, he played on L'Arc-en-Ciel guitarist Ken's first solo album In Physical, and provided live support for the recently reunited Dead End. On August 31, 2010, he appeared with the other members of Luna Sea at a press conference in Hong Kong, where they officially announced their reunion and their 20th Anniversary World Tour Reboot -to the New Moon-.

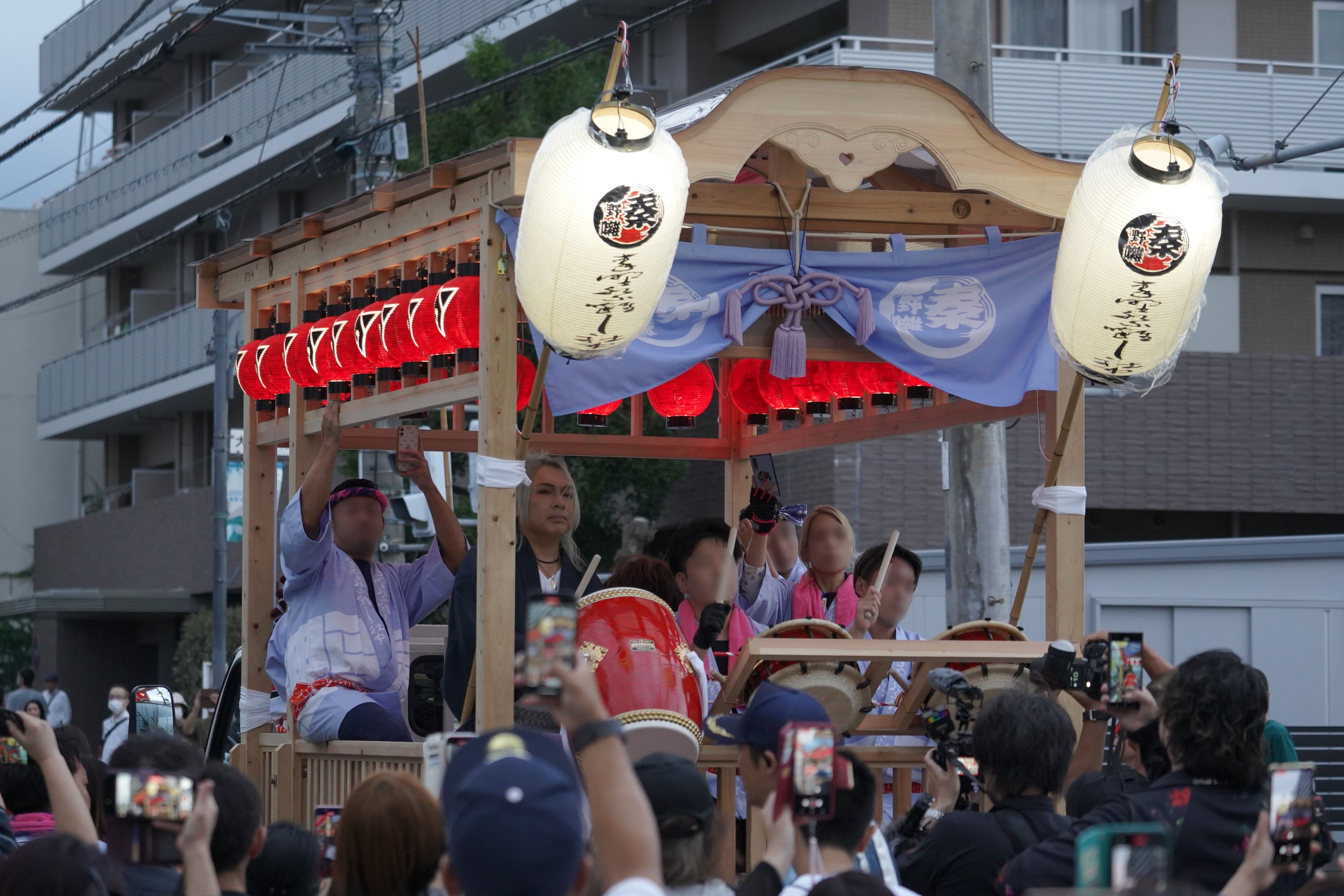
Shinya playing a drum during a festival in Hadano, Kanagawa, 2024

In response to the 2011 Tōhoku earthquake and tsunami that occurred in Japan on March 11, Shinya supported Toshi at eight concerts throughout western Japan. All of the shows were acoustic due to the electricity shortage and also featured X Japan's Heath and the Orchestra Ensemble Kanazawa. All proceeds were donated to the Japanese Red Cross to aid the victims. Shinya provided drums to the 2011 album Matsuri-bayashi by Vocaloid musician BuzzG. On June 9, 2011, he joined Yellow Fried Chickenz, a rock band formed the previous year by vocalist Gackt and guitarists Chachamaru and You. Other members who joined at the same time include former Rize bassist U:zo, Fade vocalist Jon, and third guitarist Takumi. The band toured Europe that summer, performing 14 shows in nine countries, before returning to Japan for 19 shows in nine cities. However, after only a year together as a septet, they disbanded following their July 4, 2012 Nippon Budokan concert. With Shinya, Yellow Fried Chickenz released two singles, one studio album, and three concert videos. Shinya played drums on Granrodeo's 2012 single "Can Do", which was used as the theme song to the Kuroko's Basketball anime. Shinya participated in the HIV/AIDS benefit concert Hope and Live ~ HIV/AIDS Support and Treatment Benefit Concert 2013, which was held on August 26–28 at Club Citta and included many other artists such as Zigzo and his Luna Sea bandmate Ryuichi. He also contributed to that year's Dead End tribute album, Dead End Tribute - Song of Lunatics -. Shinya and Sugizo played together on "Ai no Uta" for Ryuichi's 2014 mini-album Concept RRR 「Never Fear」. In 2016, Shinya began contributing to solo recordings by D vocalist Asagi with the triple A-side single "Seventh Sense / Shikabane no Ōja / Anpusai".

Having had to postpone most of their 2020 30th anniversary tour due to the COVID-19 pandemic in Japan, Luna Sea were set to perform at Saitama Super Arena on December 26 and 27, 2020. However, both were also postponed after Shinya tested positive for COVID-19 on the morning of December 26. On May 6, 2023, Shinya was appointed an ambassador of his hometown of Hadano, Kanagawa. He recorded the drums for the songs in Daisuke Miyazaki's 2025 visual kei-themed film V. Maria, for which Sugizo served as composer.

Shinya's last performance was with Luna Sea at their Lunatic Tokyo 2025 concert, which was held at the Tokyo Dome on February 23, 2025, and concluded their 35th anniversary celebrations. His last recording sessions took place in June 2025, for Sugizo's soundtrack to the Hyoen 2025: Kagamon no Yasha ice show. Shinya's final public appearance was on November 9 of the same year, at the second day of Luna Sea's Lunatic Fest music festival, where his former pupil, Siam Shade drummer Jun-ji, acted as his stand-in for Luna Sea's performance due to his poor health.

== Musicianship ==
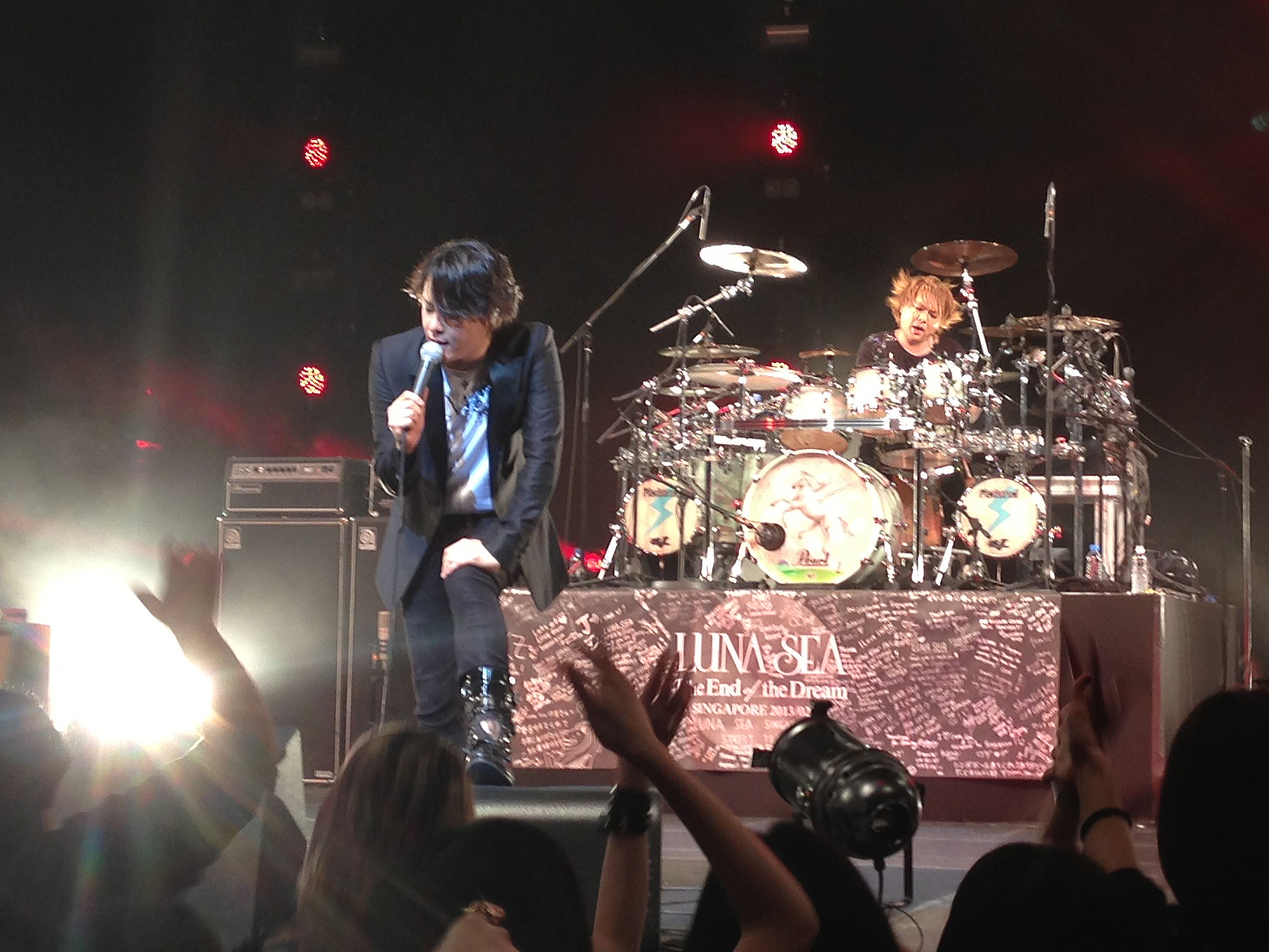
Shinya (right) performing with Luna Sea in Singapore, 2013

When asked about his drumming style, Shinya said his concept was wa or "harmony"; he enjoyed making other people happy, and therefore believed it was his "duty" to play drums for others. He also used hana (Japanese for "flower") as a word to describe his style, explaining that a flower blooms at all times, even when no one is watching. So one should try to "shine" at all times; "it is beautiful when you are blooming for yourself." In contrast, the third and final word he listed was in'yō (Japanese for "yin and yang"), referring to how a drummer must act according to the circumstances, including staying in the "shadows" if appropriate; "When you are playing a dark song, if you try to shine, there's no point to it." He speculated that his training in Noh as a child might have been the cause for his unique drumming style, and suggested the jo-ha-kyū concept might have subconsciously came out in his playing. Gota Nishidera wrote that the biggest difference between Luna Sea and their contemporaries was their rhythm section, who created a "rhythm revolution" in Japanese rock with their exquisite control and ability to freely manipulate silence and explosion. Sugizo stated that it was the Noh background that taught Shinya that knowing when not to hit, or when to mute, is more important than playing a note. He explained that while many drummers study and learn by groove, which is pulsating, the aesthetics of traditional Japanese music, from which Shinya learned to play, lie in ma, or the pauses between notes, which is where the tension lies.

Shinya cited Led Zeppelin's John Bonham as his favorite drummer. According to Sugizo, in high school, Shinya was also influenced by drummers such as Munetaka Higuchi of Loudness and Yutaka Odawara of Rebecca. Although self-taught, Shinya studied under Soul Toul, drummer of Daddy Takechiyo & Tokyo Otoboke Cats, before Luna Sea made their major label debut. Shinya said he normally did not practice drums at all in his daily life; "If you keep on thinking 'I have to get better at drums', then playing would be like studying, and your playing style would get more and more restricted and rigid. To me, that's horrible." After singing on his own 1997 solo album, Shinya said his drumming style changed to become more conscious of vocals. Because he could not read sheet music, Shinya said he struggled when he first began working as a session drummer after Luna Sea's disbandment in 2000. Hisaaki Komatsu, Luna Sea's front of house engineer since 2011, said that Shinya was particular about his drum sounds in concerts. He said that after a show, Shinya listened to a recording on the way home and messaged Komatsu to make changes for the next day. Shinya's protégé and roadie was Siam Shade drummer Jun-ji. Former Alexandros drummer Satoyasu Shomura was also one of Shinya's protégés, but quit in a rude manner, which caused a rift between them.

== Equipment ==
The first drum kit Shinya ever bought was a Pearl President Export in high school. He chose an expensive, double bass drum set because he already knew he wanted to be a professional musician. He said his love for large kits originated from Munetaka Higuchi. Throughout the majority of the 1990s, Shinya used Yamaha Drums. The relationship started before Luna Sea made their major label debut in 1992, with a Rock Tour Custom kit that utilized the Super Rack System and Paiste cymbals. As of June 1994, he was using one of their Recording Custom kits with Zildjian cymbals. Rhythm & Drums Magazine cited this as the kit that shaped Shinya's public image. It featured two bass drums, four tom drums, two floor toms, two toms mounted overhead on the Rack, two snare drums, eight electronic drum pads, and a purple-to-white faded paint job. Shinya notably used this kit during his drum solo at Luna Sea's Mafuyu no Yagai concert at Yokohama Stadium in 1996, where it was mounted on a rig that rotated 360 degrees in any direction. When Luna Sea resumed activities in 1998 after a year-long break, Shinya switched to Ludwig Drums and Paiste cymbals. According to Rhythm & Drums Magazine, he had completely revamped his signature double-bass setup to the classic rock style of John Bonham; one bass drum, one tom and two floor toms. In another similarity to Bonham, he added two timpani and a gong. In 1999, Shinya signed an endorsement contract with Pearl. In addition to liking the variety they offered and their appearances, he said the fact that both Higuchi and Reaction drummer Yasuhiro Umezawa used Pearl was a factor in signing.

He returned to colorful multi-piece drum kits when Luna Sea reunited in 2010. From then on, Shinya continued to alter his kit, including using metal-shelled drums made of copper, Rocket Toms, three bass drums, acrylic shells, and electronic drums such as Roland V-Drums. He said this was because he viewed drums like toys, and compared it to how other people often tinker and customize their automobiles. Komatsu said that Shinya was always willing to try new things. When Pearl began re-manufacturing their Crystal Beat acrylic shells, Shinya requested see-through pink ones in 2014, before switching to green ones in 2017. The drummer said he particularly liked the tone of the acrylic shells. In 2019, Shinya began using Pearl's e/Merge electronic drums. Although he had incorporated some electronic drums in his kits before, this time he went completely electronic, except for the bass drum and cymbals. After his death, it was revealed that Shinya had returned to Yamaha and was planning to once again use a Recording Custom and Zildjian setup that he designed.

Between 1994 and 1998, Yamaha produced Shinya's signature snare drum, the SD-255S. Pearl released his signature Kaminari (神鳴) snare in a limited amount in July 2010. It is a copper-shelled drum with a maple-shell on top that features phoenix artwork. In January 2019, Pearl announced the STA1455CO/SY copper-shelled snare. It was "supervised" by Shinya based on their SensiTone series and features his mascot, Kabu-chan (カブちゃん), on the badge. In December 2020, Sabian Cymbals released Shinya's signature model cymbal, The Star. Featuring small holes positioned to form the shape of a star, three types were produced; an 18" crash, an 18" Chinese, and a 10" china splash. Throughout his career, Shinya had signature drum sticks with Pearl, such as the 173H and its variants, with the Vic Firth Company, the VIC-SY, and with Ahead. He preferred the stick in his left hand to be heavier than the one in his right, using a 53g stick in his left hand, and a 50g in his right.

== Personal life and death ==
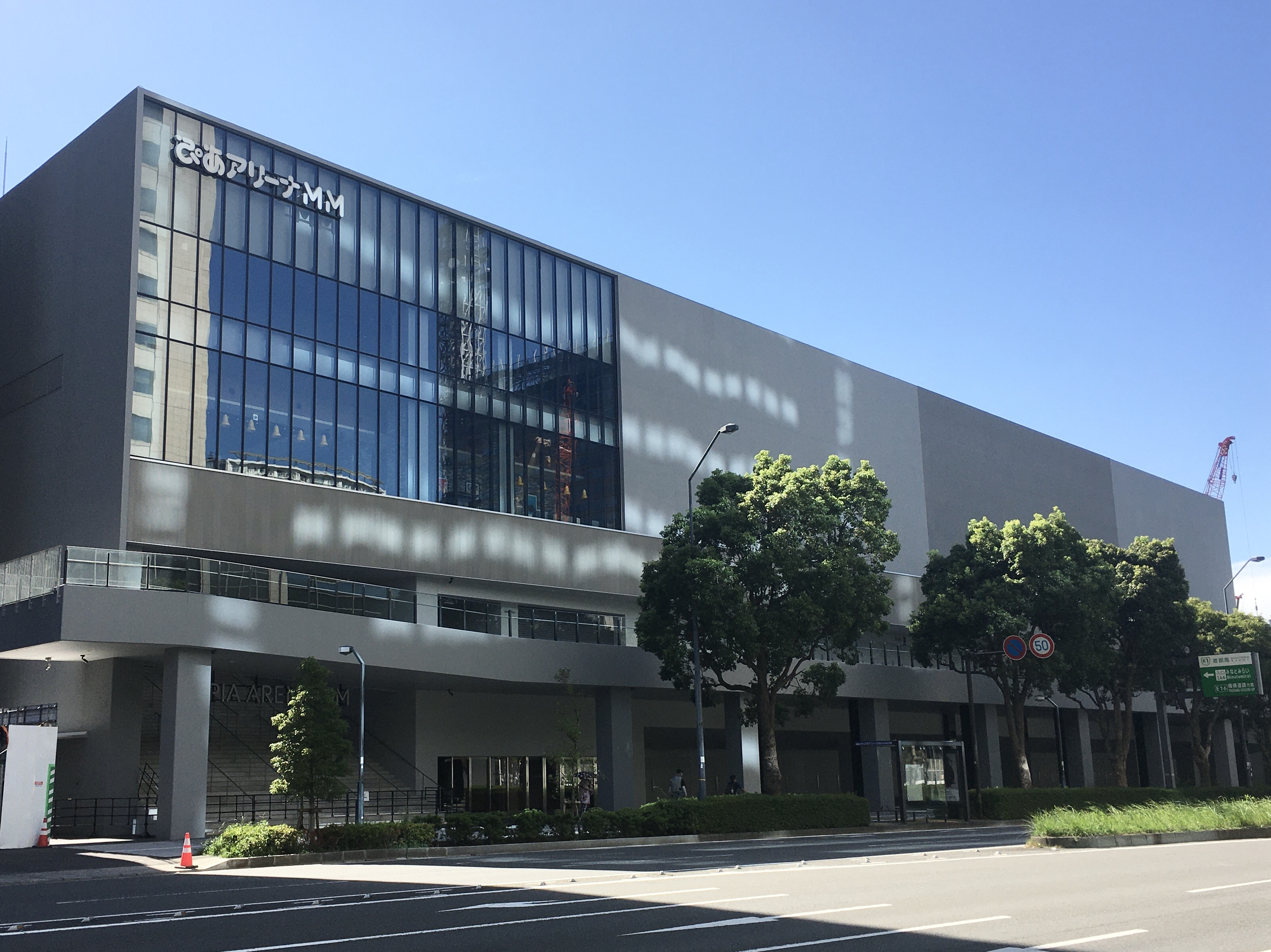
Following his death, approximately 30,000 people paid their respects to Shinya at a ceremony held at Pia Arena MM.

Shinya married former Morning Musume member Aya Ishiguro (石黒 彩) on May 12, 2000, her 22nd birthday. She was a fan of his, and they first met during the taping of a television show. Eight years his junior, Aya largely retired from the entertainment industry and became a housewife shortly after giving birth to their first child. They had three children: daughters Rimu (玲夢; born November 2000) and Sona (宙奈; born September 2002), and son Youta (耀太; born August 2004). Due to Shinya's unusual schedule for work, he rented a workspace separate from their home, and would often spend more than a week there without returning home. In 2019, Rimu made her first television appearance and announced she was taking vocal lessons to become a singer.

Shinya said his three favorite things were drums, cars and golf. He became an avid golfer in his 40s for health reasons. He and Aya said they had no hobbies in common until she also became hooked on the sport in 2017. Shinya did not normally listen to music in his daily life, explaining, "I don't want making music to be a routine thing. I want to be in love with music." But when he did, he preferred Japanese pop music and enka, such as Ikuzo Yoshi and Saburō Kitajima.

On September 8, 2025, Shinya announced that he had been diagnosed with a brain tumor and would be undergoing radiation therapy. He also revealed that he had previously been diagnosed with stage IV colon cancer in 2020 and continued to perform with Luna Sea while receiving treatment, which included radiation, chemotherapy and seven surgeries. Shinya died on February 17, 2026, after his condition suddenly worsened. He was 56. Luna Sea announced his death six days later, after a private funeral for family had been held in Tokyo. A farewell ceremony where fans could offer flowers was held at Pia Arena MM in Yokohama, Kanagawa, on March 8. Titled Shinya Kenka-shiki: Eternal Melody (真矢 献花式 〜Eternal MeLoDy〜), the ceremony was held ten times throughout the day as an approximate 30,000 attendees paid their respects. A farewell ceremony exclusively for musicians and industry professionals was held at Toyosu Pit in Tokyo on May 14 and attended by 1,000 people.

== Legacy ==
Larry Tōda of Aera referred to Shinya as a "legend in the drumming world" and the backbone of a band that defined an era, and wrote that his death left all of Japan in sorrow. Ken Kitano, editor-in-chief of Rhythm & Drums Magazine, called him a leader in the drum scene, who was uncompromising in his pursuit of a better tone and in his curiosity about new instruments. Sports Nippon called Shinya and his powerful drum sound the "heart" of Luna Sea, and noted he was widely known for his humor and cheerful personality. Similarly, Tōda noted that those unfamiliar with his music, might have known Shinya for drawing laughs on television variety programs. Masakazu Takahashi, the mayor of Shinya's hometown, called him a source of "great pride for Hadano City, and a presence that inspired dreams and courage among its citizens." Several musicians publicly expressed their condolences over his death, including Takanori Nishikawa, Show Ayanocozey, Tsunku, Boøwy drummer Makoto Takahashi, and Takeshi Tsuruno. Shazna vocalist Izam remarked that, "The beats infused with Shinya's soul were truly one of a kind", and Gackt called him a "rare drummer whose presence alone could shift the very center of gravity in the atmosphere."

Shinya inspired many drummers, including Matenrou Opera's Hibiki, Hiroki of D, Daizystripper's Kazami, Naoki of Deathgaze and Denka of Dio – Distraught Overlord. Pierre Nakano of Ling Tosite Sigure cites Shinya as an influence, as does Shinya of Dir En Grey, who reportedly also called him the number one drummer. Masahiro Matsuoka also holds Shinya in high esteem. Fumiya of Unlucky Morpheus and Kra's Yasuno were both inspired to start playing the drums because of Shinya. Jun, a guitarist who played with Shinya in Toshi with T-Earth, cited him as a huge influence and thanked him for lessons learned while working together.

== Discography ==
Singles and studio album

- "Rakkasuru Taiyō" (落下する太陽; September 26, 1997), Oricon Singles Chart Peak Position: #15
- "Hyoryusya" (漂流者, Hyōryūsha; November 21, 1997) #19
- No Sticks (December 10, 1997), Oricon Albums Chart Peak Position: #74

Home videos

- Melody (August 21, 1997)
- No Sticks (December 10, 1997)
- Shinya London Calling (February 1998)
- Shinya Jikiden Pro-Drummer no Kokoroe (真矢 直伝 プロ・ドラマーの心得; April 20, 2005)
- Shinya Jikiden Pro-Drummer no Kokoroe Best Price (October 27, 2011, re-release)

With Luna Sea

With Maki Ohguro and Friends

- Copy Band Generation Vol. 1 (March 17, 2004) #23
- Copy Band Generation Live Vol. 1 (September 29, 2004)

With Potbelly

- Crash! Crash! Crash! (August 22, 2005)

With Yellow Fried Chickenz

- "The End of the Day" (September 14, 2011) #7
- "All My Love/You are the Reason" (December 28, 2011) #10
- Yellow Fried Chickenz I (March 14, 2012) #7
- World Tour *Show Your Soul. I* Yo Kai Kizu Ketsu Ai Tamashii Matsuri at Makuhari 2011 (April 18, 2012), Oricon DVDs Chart Peak Position: #7
- World Tour *Show Your Soul. I* Yo Kai Kizu Ketsu Ai Tamashii Matsuri at Berlin 2011 (April 18, 2012) #17
- Toriaezu Kaisanssu. Sunmasenssu. (December 5, 2012)

== Other work ==
All credits are adapted from Luna Sea Complete Works Perfect Discography 30th Anniversary [Revised Edition] (2020) unless another source is given.

- J; Pyromania (July 24, 1997) – drums on "Back Line Beast"
- Various artists; Hideki Saijo Rock Tribute: Kids' Wanna Rock! (July 24, 1997) – sings with Daisuke Kikuchi on "Minami Jūjisei"
- Sugizo; Truth? (November 19, 1997) – drums on "Chemical" and "Sperma"
- d-kiku; Miniature Garden (August 1, 1998) – drums on "Tamarisque"
- Various artists; Cozy Powell Forever (September 19, 1998) – drums on "Kill the King"
- Shuichi Murakami; Welcome to My Life (September 30, 1998) – drums on "Welcome to My Rhythm [Kon'na Oira ni Dare ga Shita]"
- Hekiru Shiina; Face to Face (January 21, 1999) – drums on "Fly Away"
- Various artists; Super Rock Summit ~Tengoku e no Kaidan~ (March 17, 1999) – drums on "Moby Dick (Bonzo's Montreux)" and "We're Gonna Groove"
- Tak Matsumoto; Knockin' "T" Around (April 14, 1999) – drums on "Go Further"
- Various artists; Super Rock Summit Rainbow Eyes (June 30, 1999) – drums on "I Surrender" and "Still I'm Sad"
- The Me to Puririnsha; "No No Crying" (January 13, 2000) – lyricist
- Olivia; "Dekinai" (July 26, 2000) – drums
- Vivian Hsu; Pretend Angel (September 20, 2000) – drums on "Devil's Tear"
- Inoran; Fragment (July 25, 2001) – drums on "Bay"
- Nicholas Tse; Jade Butterfly (August 10, 2001) – drums on "Today, Your Birthday" and "Kujaku"
- Amii Ozaki; Amii-Phonic (August 22, 2001) – drums on "Yukkuri Odoru Bear no Yōna Yoru o Iku"
- Chirolyn & The Angels; "Yume no El Dorado" (September 19, 2001) – drums
- Sing Like Talking; Metabolism (September 26, 2001) – drums on "Jack Lemmon"
- Various artists; Reaction Tribute Album: Always On My Mind (October 24, 2001) – drums on "Follow the Shadow"
- Toranoko Trash; Four Leaf Clover (November 8, 2001) – producer
- Junpei Kokubo; Ichininmae ni Naritakute (December 12, 2001) – drums on "Michishirube"
- Chirolyn; "Kimi wa Kiseki wo Shinjiru Kai?" (January 23, 2002) – drums
- Sugizo feat. Bice; "Rest in Peace & Fly Away" (April 10, 2002) – drums
- Chachamaru; Air (December 21, 2002) – drums on "Metamorphose"
- Sugizo & the Spank Your Juice; "No More Machine Guns Play the Guitar" (January 24, 2003) – drums on the title track, "Remind" and "Uso"
- Sugizo & the Spank Your Juice; Brilliant Days (January 11, 2005) – appears in the music video for "Remind"
- Maki Ohguro; Happiness (June 22, 2005) – drums on "Lehman Blues"
- Nanase Aikawa; R.U.O.K?! (November 9, 2005) – drums
- Kyosuke Himuro; Soul Standing By (December 24, 2005) – drums
- Nanase Aikawa; 7.7.7 (January 1, 2006) – drums
- The Flare; The Flare (February 8, 2006) – drums on "Free Your Mind"
- Nami Tamaki; My Way/Sunrize (March 24, 2006) – drums on "Prayer -Programless Beat Mix-"
- Fake?; Songs From Beelzebub (May 24, 2006) – drums on "Disco"
- Creature Creature; Light & Lust (August 30, 2006) – drums on "Red", "Hoshi Suki", "Paradise" and "Sen no Yamiyo ni"
- Rock Fujiyama Band; Rock Fujiyama (January 24, 2007) – drums on "Basket Case", "Hound Dog (You Ain't Nothing but a Hound Hog)", "Purple Haze", "Summer of '69", "Ben", "Don't Stop Believin'" and "Are You Gonna Go My Way"
- Leonard Eto; Blendrums (April 25, 2007) – drums on "Midnight Theater" and "No Elephant (Live)"
- LM.C; "Liar Liar/Sentimental Piggy Romance" (October 10, 2007) – drums on "Liar Liar"
- Maki Ohguro; Positive Spiral (January 30, 2008) – drums on "Eikō no Kin Batch"
- LoveFixer; "Yakō/Crystal Rain" (August 27, 2008) – drums on "Crystal Rain"
- Norimasa Fujisawa; "Vincero" (August 27, 2008) – drums on "Genei"
- Binecks; "The Sun" (February 4, 2009) – drums on "Desert Rose"
- Bad Blood Project; "Maria no Yūutsu" (March 4, 2009) – drums on the title track
- Miyavi; Second Live 「Nariagari (Shaku)」 2003.10.19 at Hibiya Yagai Dai Ongakudō (April 5, 2009) – drums
- Ken; In Physical (April 22, 2009) – drums on "My Angel" and "Save Me"
- Takeshi Tsuruno; Tsuruno Uta (April 22, 2009) – drums on "Pegasus Fantasy"
- Koda Kumi; 3 Splash (July 8, 2009) – drums on "Hashire"
- Seven; "Killer Tune" (September 9, 2009) – drums on "Hana", "Kingdom", "Saw" and "Darkness"
- Takeshi Tsuruno; Tsuruno Oto (September 16, 2009) – drums on "Kimi Dake o Mamoritai"
- Abingdon Boys School; "From Dusk Till Dawn" (December 16, 2009) – drums
- Various artists; Higuchi Munetaka Tsuitō Live 2009: Munetaka Higuchi Forever Our Hero (July 14, 2010) – drums on "Black Widow", "Pray for the Dead", "Drum Solo Performances" and "Let It Go"
- Maki Ohguro; Suppin (August 25, 2010) – drums on "It's All Right"
- BuzzG featuring Gumi x Vocalists; Matsuri-bayashi (June 29, 2011) – drums
- Sugizo; Flower of Life (December 14, 2011) – drums on "Conscientia" and "Forry"
- Granrodeo; "Can Do" (April 18, 2012) – drums on the title track and "Love in Shelter"
- Yuina; "Kabuki On'na no Nare no Hate/Shiawase Neiro" (February 6, 2013) – drums
- AKB48; Dai 2-kai AKB48 Kōhaku Taikō Utagassen (March 27, 2013) – drums on "Give Me Five!"
- Various artists; Dead End Tribute - Song of Lunatics (September 4, 2013) – drums on "So Sweet So Lonely"
- Dempagumi.inc; "W.W.D II" (October 2, 2013) – remixed "W.W.D II (Shinya Tataitemita Remix)"
- Nanase Aikawa; "Sakura Maioriru Koro, Namidairo" (March 5, 2014) – drums on "Sakura Maioriru Koro, Namidairo feat. Nanase"
- Ryuichi Kawamura; Concept RRR 「Never Fear」 (October 1, 2014) – drums on "Nagaiyo no Owari ni" and "Ai no Uta"
- Asagi; "Seventh Sense / Shikabane no Ōja / Anpusai" (April 27, 2016) – drums on "Shikabane no Ōja"
- Asagi; Madara (January 31, 2018) – tsuzumi on "Tenchi Ikikuru Kofune", drums, tsuzumi, ōtsuzumi and taiko on "Tsuki-kai no Miko" and Japanese drums on "Yōtō Gyokuto"
- Asagi; "Yōko no Yomeiri" (September 24, 2018) – tsuzumi, ōtsuzumi, and taiko
- Maki Ohguro; Music Muscle (December 5, 2018) – drums on "Because, You..."
- Sugizo feat. Glim Spanky; "Meguriai" (June 11, 2019) – drums
- Asagi; "Amabie" (August 29, 2020) – tsuzumi, ōtsuzumi, and taiko
- Asagi; "Kitsune Hanabi" (August 7, 2024) – tsuzumi, ōtsuzumi, and taiko
- Sugizo; Hyoen 2025: Kagamon no Yasha - Original Soundtrack (June 10, 2026) – drums on "Seigi no Kyōgun", "Kaikō", "Chinkon" and "Kishū~Chemical"
