= Power of Dreams =

Power of Dreams may refer to:

- Power of Dreams (band), a Dublin-based rock band
- Power of Dreams (album), a 1997 album by Maki Ohguro
