= Stop motion (disambiguation) =

Stop motion is an animation technique.

It may also refer to:

- Stopmotion (film), a 2023 animated horror movie
- Stop Motion (EP), the EP by Maki Ohguro
