= CAM Entertainment =

Japanese record label

- Parent company: CyberAgent (through Jei-One)
- Founded: May 1, 2008
- Distributor(s): Avex Group (2008-present)
- Genre: J-pop
- Country of origin: Japan
- Location: Shibuya, Tokyo

CAM Entertainment Co. Ltd. (株式会社CAMエンタテインメント, Kabushiki Gaisha CAM Entateinmento) is a Japanese record label founded by CyberAgent, the company behind ameba.

The initials CAM mean Cyber Agent Music.

== Artists ==
- Maki Ohguro
- Miyu Nagase
- Maika Sawaki
- Sacon
- Strawberry Record
- Wonder-holic
- Eri Yoshida
- Mistral

== See also ==
- List of record labels
- Avex Group (distributor)
