= U.Be Love =

EP by Maki Ohguro
- Released: 10 November 1993
- Recorded: 1992–1993
- Genre: Pop rock, power pop
- Length: 31:00
- Label: B-Gram
- Producer: Daiko Nagato

Maki Ohguro chronology
Da Da Da (1993)	U.Be Love (1993)	Eien no Yume ni Mukatte (1994)

Singles from U.Be Love
- 1. "Wakaremashō Watashi Kara Kiemashō Anata Kara" Released: 10 February 1993; 2. "Harlem Night" Released: 28 July 1993

U.Be Love is the third studio album and second mini album by Japanese J-pop singer and songwriter Maki Ohguro. It was released on 10 November 1993 under B-Gram Records.

== Background ==
Album consist of two previously released singles, Wakaremashō Watashi Kara Kiemashō Anata Kara and Harlem Night. The coupling song Kimi wo Aisareru Sono tame ni from single Chotto was included in this album as well. Blue Christmas is the first Christmas thematic song written and composed by Maki herself. It has become Nagato's final produce for Ohguro due to his temporarily retirement from the music industry on the same year.

== Promotion ==
=== Singles ===
Wakaremashō Watashi Kara Kiemashō Anata Kara is the fourth single released on 10 February 1993, on the same day as her second studio album Da Da Da. The single has become well known and memorable for its long title along with the B'z "Ai no mama ni Wagamama ni Boku wa Kimi dake o Kizutsukenai". The lyrics are based on her own experience with disappointed love relationship. It was used as a theme song to a short television-drama series "Neo Drama". The single debut at number 3 on the Oricon Single Weekly Charts and sold over 667k copies. On the 1993 yearly oricon charts, the single remained at number 42. It has been rewarded with the Double Platinum disc by RIAJ.

Harlem Night is the fifth single released on 28 July 1993. It was used as a theme song to the Fuji TV television program "Personal Watching Jab!". The single debut at number 3 on the Oricon Single Weekly Charts and sold over 400k copies. The single was rewarded with the Double Platinum disc by RIAJ.

== Chart performance ==
The album reached No. 2 in its first week on the Oricon Album Weekly chart. The album sold overall 267,640 copies. In the 1993 Yearly Oricon Ranking Charts, the album stayed at number 59 and in 1994 Yearly Charts, the album stayed at number 62.

== Track listing ==
All tracks arranged by Takeshi Hayama.

All lyrics are written by Maki Ohguro; all music is composed by Maki Ohguro.

No.	Title	Length
1.	"Delight"	3:58
2.	"U.Be Love"	4:19
3.	"Are Kore Kangaetatte... (アレ・コレ考えたって…)"	3:17
4.	"Wakaremashō Watashi Kara Kiemashō Anata Kara (別れましょう私から消えましょうあなたから)"	5:03
5.	"Kimi ni Aisareru Sono Tame ni... (君に愛されるそのために)"	4:31
6.	"Harlem Night"	4:06
7.	"Blue Christmas"	5:24
Total length:		30:41

- Note: The track list is taken from the artists official website and production list of staff from the booklet of the album.

== Release history ==
Year	Format(s)	Serial number	Label(s)	Ref.
1993	CD	TOCT-8185	EMi Music Japan	-
1994	CD	BGCH-1011	B-Gram Records	-
2019	digital download, streaming	-	B Zone	
