= Phoenix (Maki Ohguro album) =

Studio album by Maki Ohguro
- Released: 23 December 2020
- Recorded: 2019–2020
- Genre: Japanese pop
- Length: 78:51
- Label: Being Inc.
- Producer: Maki Ohguro

Maki Ohguro chronology
Music Muscle (2018)	Phoenix (2020)

Singles from Phoenix
- 1. "Sharely Christmas" Released: 25 December 2019 (Digital single); 2. "Let's Go Girls" Released: 1 March 2020 (Digital single); 3. "Rainbow Quest" Released: 15 April 2020 (Digital single); 4. "OK" Released: 27 May 2020 (Digital single); 5. "Shake Shaka You'll be All Right" Released: 30 June 2020 (Digital single); 6. "Get Your Wave" Released: 31 July 2020 (Digital single); 7. "Pray for you: Shigatsu no Elegie" Released: 31 August 2020 (Digital single); 8. "Dee Dee Dee Dee Deeper Love: Ai no Social Distance" Released: 31 August 2020 (Digital single); 9. "Phoenix" Released: 30 September 2020 (Digital single); 10. "We are the Love: Dedicated to J & L" Released: 28 October 2020 (Digital single); 11. "Sister Sister Sister" Released: 30 November 2020 (Digital single); 12. "Hashire! Hashire! Hashire!" Released: 21 December 2020 (Digital single)

Phoenix is the fifteenth studio album by Japanese singer-songwriter Maki Ohguro. It was released on 23 December 2020 under the Being Inc. label. It's her first studio album for the first time in 2 years. The album contains various collaboration tracks from various musicians, such as Ryota Mitsunaga, Rose Touma.

This album was released in two formats: regular edition and limited first press edition with DVD. The DVD disc includes 180 minute footage of the live tour "Maki Ohguro Music Muscle Tour 2019".

== Promotion ==
=== Singles ===
This album consist of twelve previously released singles, all of them released as a digital singles.

Digital single Sharely Christmas was released on 25 December 2019 and served as an theme song to the Christmas Event "Tokyo Great Santa Run Gift".Let's Go Girls was released in March 2020. The single served as a theme song to the marathon event "Nagoya Women's Marathon 2020". Another digital single "OK was released in May 2020 and will serve as a theme song to the theatrical movie "Utsusemi no Mori".

== Commercial performance ==
The album reached #44 in its first week and charted for 3 weeks. The album was a commercial failure, remaining as her lowest-charting and worst-selling studio album as of February, 2021.

== Track listing ==
All lyrics are written by Maki Ohguro (expect #2 (co-written by QUEST ALL STARs), #9(co-written by Rose Touma); all music is composed by Maki Ohguro (expect #2 (co-written by QUEST ALL STARs), #4 (co-written by Ryota Mitsunaga), #6 an #11 (co-written by Yohey), #12 (co-written by Ryota Asai)).

No.	Title	Arranger(s)	Length
1.	"Let's☆Go!! Girls" (digital single)	Yohey	4:57
2.	"RAINBOW QUEST: Bokura wa Peace Mate with Rainbow Kids (僕らはピースメイト)" (digital single)	Katsuyuki Mito	7:08
3.	"OK" (digital single)	Satoshi Takebe	7:20
4.	"Shaka Shake You'll Be All right-Big Wave ver." (digital single)	Takebe	7:11
5.	"Get Your Wave" (digital single)	Yohey	5:48
6.	"Dee Dee Dee Dee Deeper Love: Ai no Social Distance" (digital single)	Yohey	5:13
7.	"Pray for you: Shigatsu no Elegie" (digital single)	Yohey	6:30
8.	"Phoenix" (digital single)	Yohey	6:28
9.	"WE ARE THE LOVE: dedicated to J & L" (digital single)	Yohey	7:53
10.	"SISTER SISTER SISTER" (digital single)	Yohey	4:55
11.	"Junsui na Hito (純粋な人)"	Yohey	5:54
12.	"Hashire! Hashire! Hashire (走れ！ 走れ！ 走れ！)" (digital single)	Ryota Asai	4:09
13.	"Sharely Christmas" (digital single)	Akihito Tokunaga	5:33
