= Mother Earth (Maki Ohguro album) =

Studio album by Maki Ohguro
- Released: 9 September 1998
- Recorded: 1998
- Genre: Japanese pop
- Length: 57:00
- Label: B-Gram
- Producer: Takeshi Hayama

Maki Ohguro chronology
Power of Dreams (1997)	Mother Earth (1998)	O (2001)

Singles from Mother Earth
- 1. "Ne! ~Onna Jounetsu~" Released: 26 February 1996

Mother Earth is the seventh studio album by Japanese J-pop singer and songwriter Maki Ohguro. It was released on 9 September 1998 under B-Gram Records. For the first time the arranger Takeshi became the main producer of this album.

Album consist of the only one previously released singles, Ne! ~Onna Jounetsu~.

Two tracks out of thirteen are instrumental, composed by Maki herself and Takeshi Hayama.

The album reached No. 1 in its first week on the Oricon chart. The album sold 714,000 copies. This is last time when her album reached No.1 in Oricon weekly charts.

It's her last studio album released in B-Gram Records. Before moving to new label EMI Japan by Universal Music Japan, she released in 1999 her second compilation album Maki Ohguro Best of Best ~All Singles Collection~.

== Track listing ==
All tracks arranged by Takeshi Hayama.

All lyrics are written by Maki Ohguro; all music is composed by Maki Ohguro (expect of #1, by Takeshi Hayama)

No.	Title	Length
1.	"Introduction" (instrumental)	0:39
2.	"Wake (理由)"	4:39
3.	"Kono Yami wo Tsukinukeru (この闇を突き抜ける)"	4:19
4.	"Sign (サ☆イ★ン)"	5:23
5.	"Wasurete shimaitainoni (忘れてしまいたいのに)"	4:12
6.	"Usotsuki (うそつき)"	5:31
7.	"Suki Suki Suki (スキ・スキ・スキ)"	4:34
8.	"Ne! ~Onna Jounetsu~ (ネッ! 〜女、情熱〜)"	4:44
9.	"Tooi Sora de (遠い空で きっと)"	4:01
10.	"I can't stop the rain"	5:48
11.	"Bokura no Shiranai Tokoro de (ボクらの知らないところで)"	3:15
12.	"Go with the wind"	6:00
13.	"Mother Earth" (instrumental)	3:12

== In media ==
- Kono Yami wo Tsukinukeru: theme song for Toto Super Athletics Convention 1998
- Ne! ~Onna Jounetsu~: commercial song of Kanebo Cosmetics's Testimo II
