= Da Da Da (album) =

Studio album by Maki Ohguro
- Released: 28 April 1993
- Recorded: 1992–1993
- Genre: Pop rock; power pop; new wave
- Length: 43 minutes
- Label: B-Gram
- Producer: Daiko Nagato

Maki Ohguro chronology
Stop Motion (1992)	Da Da Da (1993)	U.Be Love (1993)

Singles from Da Da Da
- 1. "Da Ka Ra" Released: 27 September 1992; 2. "Chotto" Released: 10 February 1993

Da Da Da (stylized as DA・DA・DA) is the second studio album by Japanese J-pop singer and songwriter Maki Ohguro. It was released on 28 April 1993 under Emi Music Japan, on same day as the fourth single, "Wakaremashō Watashi Kara Kiemashō Anata Kara" (which is included on the next studio album U.Be Love).

== Background ==
Album includes two previously singles, "Dakara" and "Chotto", which raised her popularity as singer with more than 1.84 million sold copies together and 8 newly recorded songs.

== Promotion ==
=== Singles ===
"Dakara" is the second single overall and her final single to be released in 1992. The single was written by coincidence meeting with the director of the television commercial for Toyo Suisan's Hot Noodles, who requested personally Ohguro to write the song within one night. The single has been her first hit song, charted on the number 2 on the Oricon Single Weekly Charts and sold in total more than million copies. In the 1992 Yearly Oricon Ranking Charts, it stayed at number 20 and in 1993 Yearly Ranking Charts at number 103. Ohguro was however scolded by the agency, who she did not let consulate regarding the use of song for the television commercial. The single has been rewarded with the Golden Million Disc by RIAJ.

"Chotto" is the third single in general and first single to be released in 1993. Unlike the previous single, this one has been written by the Tetsuro Oda. It served as a theme song to the Japanese television drama Ichigo Hakushou. The single debut at number 4 on the Oricon Weekly Charts and sold over 840,000 copies. In the 1993 Yearly Oricon Ranking Charts, it stayed at number 23. The single has been rewarded with the Triple Platinum Disc by RIAJ.

== Chart performance ==
The album reached number 2 in its first week on the Oricon album chart. The album charted for 42 weeks and sold 746,000 copies. In the 1993 Yearly Oricon Ranking Charts, the album stayed at number 15.

== Track listing ==
All tracks arranged by Takeshi Hayama.

All lyrics are written by Maki Ohguro; all music is composed by Maki Ohguro, except tracks 3 (by Tetsurō Oda) and 4 (by Takeshi Hayama).

No.	Title	Length
1.	"Da Da Da"	4:08
2.	"Koi no Time Machine (恋のTIME MACHINE)"	4:27
3.	"Chotto (チョット)"	3:39
4.	"Da Ka Ra"	3:26
5.	"Guts My Mind!!"	4:33
6.	"Motomeru Mirai ga Kawatta (求める未来が変わった)"	5:23
7.	"Crazy Wolf"	3:52
8.	"Magy'92"	4:27
9.	"Manhattan Beach"	4:31
10.	"(Itsuka Mieru...Kitto Wakaru... (いつか見える…きっとわかる…)"	4:38

- Note: The track list is taken from the artists official website and production list of staff from the booklet of the album.

The third track, Chotto (チョット), was used as opening theme for the 1993 NTV TV drama Ichigo Hakusho.

== Release history ==
Year	Format(s)	Serial number	Label(s)	Ref.
1992	CD	TOCT-8045	EMi Music Japan	-
1994	CD	BGCH-1010	B-Gram Records	-
2019	digital download, streaming	-	B Zone	
