= O (Maki Ohguro album) =

Studio album by Maki Ohguro
- Released: 12 December 2001
- Recorded: 1999–2001
- Genre: Japanese pop
- Length: 69:00
- Label: EMI Japan
- Producer: Takeshi Hayama

Maki Ohguro chronology
Mother Earth (1998)	O (2001)	Presents (2002)

Singles from O
- 1. "Niji wo Koete" Released: 8 August 2001; 2. "Yuki ga Furu Mae ni" Released: 31 October 2001

O is the eighth studio album by Japanese J-pop singer and songwriter Maki Ohguro. It was released on 12 December 2001 under new label EMI Japan by distributors Universal Music Japan. The album includes two previously released singles, such as "Niji wo Koete" and "Yuki ga Furu Mae ni". "Promise I Do" features backing vocals of Japanese pop singer Hikaru Utada.

The album reached No. 8 on its first week on the Oricon chart, and sold 89,000 copies.

== Track listing ==
All tracks arranged by Takeshi Hayama.

All lyrics are written by Maki Ohguro; all music is composed by Maki Ohguro (expect 2 and 8 by Takeshi Hayama)

No.	Title	Length
1.	"Promise I do"	5:38
2.	"Overdrive"	4:39
3.	"XX!! No!! My Life!!"	4:42
4.	"Sayonara tte... (さよならって・・・)"	4:58
5.	"Kura kurasaseteyo -Tobby's Mix-"	0:19
6.	"Starlight ~Utsukushii Hoshi ni Kidzukanakereba~ (Starlight 〜美しい星に気づかなければ〜)"	5:08
7.	"Niji wo Koete (虹ヲコエテ)"	3:55
8.	"Tripper☆Skipper☆"	5:13
9.	"Kura Kurasaseteyo (クラクラさせてよ)"	4:30
10.	"Baby Baby Baby"	5:29
11.	"Yuki ga Furu Mae ni (雪が降るまえに)" (album mix)	6:28
12.	"Kono Hi no Tame ni (この日のために)"	5:11
13.	"Life is alive" (instrumental)	5:24
14.	"Niji wo Koete (虹ヲコエテ)" (live version)	7:17

== In media ==
- Niji wo Koete: commercial song of Morinaga Milk Industry's Lactoferrin Yogurt
- Yuki ga Furu Mae ni: theme song for Tokyo Broadcasting System Television television drama Kochira Dai San Kaishabu
- Starlight ~Utsukushii Hoshi ni Kidzukanakereba~: theme song for Tokyo Broadcasting System Television program Zone
- Promise I do: commercial song of Taisho Pharmaceutical Co.'s Zena
