= Presents (Maki Ohguro album) =

Studio album by Maki Ohguro
- Released: 11 December 2002
- Recorded: 2002
- Genre: Japanese pop, jazz
- Length: 64:00
- Label: EMI Japan
- Producer: Satoshi Takebe

Maki Ohguro chronology
O (2001)	Presents (2002)	Rhythm Black (2003)

Presents is the ninth studio album by Japanese J-pop singer and songwriter Maki Ohguro. It was released on 11 December 2002 under EMI Japan.

== Album ==
This album isn’t made up of singles, rather it is a conceptual album about theme "love". Compared to Ohguro’s other albums, the music on the album sounds less pop-rock and carries a calmer and jazzy feeling.

Takeshi Hayama, the main producer of Ohguro’s albums since her debut, wasn't involved in the production of this album. Satoshi Takebe, the member of the band Kokua is the main producer of this album, as well as other music arrangers from Universal Music Japan.

== Reception ==
The album reached No. 18 in its first week on the Oricon chart. The album sold 28,000 copies.

== Track listing ==
All lyrics are written by Maki Ohguro; all music is composed by Maki Ohguro

No.	Title	Arrangers	Length
1.	"Mayonaka no Whistle (真夜中のホイッスル)"	Toshiya Shimizu	5:25
2.	""Aishiteru" no Kawari ni ~Everything in my heart~ (『愛してる』のかわりに～Everything in my heart～)"	Kento Hiidani	5:39
3.	"True Love"	Shimizu	5:27
4.	"Come To Me, Once Again"	Keiji Tanabe	5:59
5.	"Umi Demo Ikouka (海でも行こうか)"	Satoshi Takebe	3:20
6.	"Kiichigo (キイチゴ)"	Hiidani	6:29
7.	"Akai Ito (赤い糸)"	Takebe	6:02
8.	"Lonely Child"	Takebe	6:07
9.	"River"	Tanabe	3:55
10.	"3-Call & 1-Mail"	Takebe	5:14
11.	"Saigo no Present (最後のプレゼント)"	Takebe	4:41
12.	"Ai no Uta (愛のうた)"	Takebe	5:11

== In media ==
- 3-Call & 1-Mail: commercial song of NTT DoCoMo
- Ai no Uta: theme song for the Toyota Stadium
