= Rhythm Black =

Studio album by Maki Ohguro
- Released: 25 June 2003
- Recorded: 2002–2003
- Genre: Japanese pop
- Length: 68:00
- Label: EMI Japan
- Producer: Maki Ohguro

Maki Ohguro chronology
Presents (2002)	Rhythm Black (2003)	Happiness (2005)

Singles from Rhythm Black
- 1. "Identity" Released: 29 May 2002; 2. "Katte ni Kimenaide yo" Released: 12 March 2003; 3. "Natsu ga Kuru Soshite" Released: 28 May 2003

Rhythm Black is the tenth studio album by Japanese J-pop singer and songwriter Maki Ohguro. It was released on 25 June 2003 under EMI Japan.

This album consist of three previously released singles, such as Identity, Katte ni Kimenaide yo and Natsu ga Kuru Soshite. Natsu ga Kuru Soshite coupling song Fowin' has received special album mix under title Maki's Scat Mix.

In this album Maki becomes self-producer for the first time since her major debut in 1992. The album is released for the first time in Copy Control CD format.

The album reached No. 20 in its first week on the Oricon chart. The album sold 39,000 copies. This is her last album which reached into Top 20 Oricon weekly charts.

== Track listing ==
All lyrics are written by Maki Ohguro; all music is composed by Maki Ohguro

No.	Title	Arrangers	Length
1.	"Natsu ga Kuru, Soshite... (夏が来る、そして…)"	Akira Nishihira	5:25
2.	"Katte ni Kimenaide yo (勝手に決めないでよ)"	Nishihira	4:36
3.	"Cyber Love intro" (instrumental)	Akimitsu Honma	0:30
4.	"Cyber Love"	Honma	4:45
5.	"0°CのTENDERNESS"	Mikio Endō	4:35
6.	"Suna no Kodoku (砂の孤独)"	Nishihira	4:40
7.	"Unmei Nante Kuso Kurae -Runaway Blood- (運命なんかクソ食らえ-RUNAWAY BLOOD-)"	Nishihira	5:13
8.	"Get The Groove"	Honma	3:45
9.	"Ano Bus ni Notte (あのバスに乗って)"	Toshiya Shimizu	6:05
10.	"Friendship"	Tomoji Sogawa	6:00
11.	"Shiosai (潮騒)"	Shimizu	6:44
12.	"Subarashii Sekai (素晴らしい世界)"	GO SUZUKI & Water Pipe & Dreams	4:47
13.	"Identity (アイデンティティ)"	Takao Konishi	5:11
14.	"flowin'" (Maki's Scat Mix)	GO SUZUKI & Water Pipe & Dreams	5:11

== In media ==
- Natsu ga Kuru Soshite: ending theme for Nihon TV program Sports Uru Sugu
- Identity: image song for Tokyo Broadcasting System Television soccer program
