= Happiness (Maki Ohguro album) =

Studio album by Maki Ohguro
- Released: 22 June 2005
- Recorded: 2004–2005
- Genre: Japanese pop
- Length: 69:00
- Label: EMI Japan
- Producer: Maki Ohguro

Maki Ohguro chronology
Rhythm Black (2003)	Happiness (2005)	Positive Spiral (2008)

Singles from Happiness
- 1. "Asahi~Shine&Groove~" Released: 29 May 2004; 2. "Over Top" Released: 12 March 2005

Happiness is the eleventh studio album by Japanese J-pop singer and songwriter Maki Ohguro. It was released on 22 June 2005 under EMI Japan.

This album consist of two previously released singles, such as Asahi~Shine&Groove~ and Over Top.

The album reached No. 28 in its first week on the Oricon chart. The album sold 21,000 copies.

== Track listing ==
All lyrics are written by Maki Ohguro; all music is composed by Maki Ohguro

No.	Title	Arrangers	Length
1.	"Interlude:“Hey! Baby”"	Akira Nishihira	0:33
2.	"THE END"	Nishihira	5:55
3.	"Do it for me ~Zanshou~ (Do it for me〜残照〜)"	Nishihira	5:07
4.	"Life~episode I~Tanjou~ (LIFE〜episode I〜誕生〜)"	Nishihira	5:54
5.	"Makeinu no Shout!! (負け犬のSHOUT!!)"	Nishihira	5:12
6.	"Minami Kaze ni Notte (南風に乗って)"	Nishihira	4:49
7.	"Kouishou (後遺症)"	Keiichi Okabe	5:17
8.	"Precious Pleasures"	Nishihira	5:01
9.	"Tasogare (黄昏)"	Nishihira	4:25
10.	"Matataku Hoshi no you ni (瞬く星のように)"	Hibiki Hanasaka	5:41
11.	"Over Top"	Nishihira	5:30
12.	"Lehman Blues (リーマンブルース)"	Satoshi Takebe	4:17
13.	"Happiness"	Nishihira	6:28
14.	"Asahi~Shine&Groove~"	Akimitsu Honma	4:57

== In media ==
- Asahi~Shine&Groove~: official support song for Japan Hockey Association Official Japanese National Team: Women's Hockey Team
- Over Top: official theme song for Bridgestone's INDY JAPAN 300mile
