= La La La (Maki Ohguro album) =

Studio album by Maki Ohguro
- Released: 19 July 1995
- Recorded: 1994–1995
- Genre: Japanese pop
- Length: 48:00
- Label: B-Gram
- Producer: BMF

Maki Ohguro chronology
Eien no Yume ni Mukatte (1994)	La La La (1995)	Power of Dreams (1997)

Singles from La.La.La
- 1. "La La La" Released: 20 February 1995; 2. "Ichiban Chikaku ni Itene" Released: 3 May 1995

La La La (ら・ら・ら) is the fifth studio album by Japanese J-pop singer and songwriter Maki Ohguro. It was released on 19 July 1995 under B-Gram Records.

Album consist of two previously released singles, La La La and Ichiban Chikaku ni Itene. "La La La" is one of her most iconic songs as singer, and sold more than million copies. "Ichiban Chikaku ni Itene" has received special album mix under the title Carnival version.

The album reached No. 1 in its first week on the Oricon chart. The album sold 1,618,000 copies. This makes it her second studio album which sold more than one million copies. It got rewarded with Gold disc by Recording Industry Association of Japan.

== Track listing ==
All tracks arranged by Takeshi Hayama.

All lyrics are written by Maki Ohguro; all music is composed by Maki Ohguro.

La.La.La
No.	Title	Length
1.	"Tender Rain"	4:55
2.	"Fire"	4:26
3.	"Lovin' you"	5:14
4.	"Ichiban Chikaku ni Itene (いちばん近くにいてね)" (Carnival version)	4:52
5.	"Anata ga Ireba Sore dakede yokatta (あなたがいればそれだけでよかった)"	5:19
6.	"Summer Breeze"	4:18
7.	"Koi wa Merry Go Round (恋はメリーゴーランド)" (original version)	4:31
8.	"Taiyou wo Tsukamae ni Ikou (太陽をつかまえに行こう)"	4:06
9.	"Mou Ichido dake... (もう一度だけ…)"	5:09
10.	"La La La (ら・ら・ら)"	4:24

== In media ==
- La La La: theme song for TV Asahi television drama Aji Ichi Monme
