= Positive Spiral =

Studio album by Maki Ohguro
- Released: 30 January 2008
- Recorded: 2006–2008
- Genre: Japanese pop
- Length: 71:00
- Label: EMI Japan
- Producer: Maki Ohguro

Maki Ohguro chronology
Happiness (2005)	Positive Spiral (2008)	Suppin (2010)

Singles from Positive Spiral
- 1. "Kore de Ii no?!/Koi no Akuma -She's no Angel-" Released: 29 May 2007

Positive Spiral is the twelfth studio album by Japanese J-pop singer and songwriter Maki Ohguro.

== Release ==
Positive Spiral was released on 30 January 2008 under the EMI Japan label. The album was released on her 15th debut anniversary celebration.

This is her last album which was released under EMI Japan. Her next studio album, Suppin is released under 32 Records label.

== Album contents ==
This album consist of only previously released singles, Kore de Ii no?!/Koi no Akuma -She's no Angel-. This is her the first album which is released in two formats: regular CD edition and limited CD+DVD edition. DVD disc consist of three music videoclips and CD disc unreleased bonus tracks.

== Reception ==
The album reached No. 39 in its first week on the Oricon chart. The album sold 9,000 copies.

== Track listing ==
All lyrics are written by Maki Ohguro; all music is composed by Maki Ohguro

No.	Title	Arrangers	Length
1.	"Positive Spiral"	Akira Nishihira	5:01
2.	"Groove On ~Nuide Goran~ (Groove On～脱いでごらん～)"	Kei Kawano	4:33
3.	"Shitsui no Aurora (失意のオーロラ)"	Nishihira	5:09
4.	"Rock You, Rock Me"	Larry Honda	7:56
5.	"Sairyo no Hi (最良の日)"	Kawano	5:03
6.	"Namae mo Shiranai Kimi ni (名前もしらないキミに)"	Honda	5:59
7.	"Kore de Ii no?! (コレデイイノ？！)"	Satoshi Takebe	5:52
8.	"Tenonaruhou he (テノナルホウヘ)"	Nishihira	6:02
9.	"GO☆"	Honda	5:28
10.	"Boku ga Kimi de Kimi ga Boku nara (僕が君でキミがボクなら)"	Nishihira	6:10
11.	"Eikou no Kin Batch (栄光の金バッチ)"	Nishihira	8:06
12.	"Start Line"	Honda	5:28

== In media ==
- Positive Spiral: theme song for Nihon TV program NNN News Real Time
