= Maki Ohguro =

Japanese singer-songwriter (born 1969)

Maki Ohguro 大黒 摩季
- Born: 31 December 1969 (age 56); Sapporo, Hokkaido, Japan
- Genres: J-Pop
- Occupations: Singer; songwriter; lyricist; composer
- Years active: 1989–2010; 2015–present
- Labels: Toshiba EMI; B-Gram; Virgin; Cam; 32
- Website: maki-ohguro.com

YouTube information
- Channel: Maki Ohguro Official Channel
- Years active: 2016 –
- Subscribers: 116 thousand
- Views: 156 million
- Last updated: 4 August 2026

Maki Ohguro (大黒 摩季, Ōguro Maki; born 31 December 1969) is a Japanese pop singer and songwriter from Sapporo, Hokkaido under B-Gram Records label.

== Biography ==
In 1989, she passed Being Inc.'s singers audition, the "3rd BAD".

In 1992, she debuted with the single "Stop Motion" released under B-Gram Records. Her second single "DA・KA・RA" sold 1.1 million copies and won the Japan Record Grand Prix Newcomer Award of the Year. Because of her rare public appearances, she was originally known as a phantom singer, like Izumi Sakai of Zard. Her famous songs are "DA・KA・RA", "Chotto", as well as others. "Anata Dake Mitsumeteru", the first ending theme for Slam Dunk, was the number 2 song for the month of January 1994, and is certified as a Million record, selling 1,087,160 copies. She joined in production of albums and singles in position of backing chorus for various artist including Field of View, Wands, Deen, Zard and many others.

In 1999, she released a compilation album Maki Ohguro Best of Best -All Singles Collection-, then left Being Inc. In 2002, Satoshi Takebe suggested they form a rock band to support Ohguro. It included Luna Sea drummer Shinya, hide with Spread Beaver bassist Chirolyn, and guitarist Shinjiroh Inoue. Ohguro signed with EMI Music Japan in 2003. With a lineup of Takebe, Shinya, The Street Sliders guitarist Kouhei Tsuchiya and Judy and Mary bassist Yoshihito Onda, Maki Ohguro and Friends (大黒摩季とフレンズ, Ōguro Maki to Furenzu) released the cover album Copy Band Generation Vol. 1 on 17 March 2004. They temporarily reunited for a tour in October 2007. On 25 August 2010, the same day her studio album Suppin was released, Ohguro announced a hiatus from music activities due to ovarian illness which resulted in hysterectomy due to multiple miscarriages.

After six-years of hiatus, in June 2016 she announced resume of her music activities under her debut company, Being Inc. Two months later on 10 August, she released new digital single "Higher Higher". On 18 November 2016 Maki has made her television appearance after 18 years in Music Station program.

Since February 2017 she is performing her live tour Maki Ohguro 2017 Live-STEP!! ~Higher↗↗Higher↗↗Chuunen yo Atsuku Nare!! Greatest Hits +~ in 47 prefectures. At the end of May, Ohguro participated as a guest artist at the annual touring ice show Fantasy on Ice in Makuhari, where she performed to her song "La La La" in the finale amongst others. In September 2017, she released her first single after hiatus titled "Lie,Lie,Lie", which was used in media as an opening theme for Anime television series Case Closed. Ohguro provided backing vocals for three songs on Luna Sea's 2017 album Luv, and later performed at their Lunatic Fest at Makuhari Messe on 24 June 2018.

So far she has released 37 singles, 15 studio albums and 6 best-of albums.

On 11 March 2022, Ohguro participated in the Shuichi "Ponta" Murakami tribute concert "One Last Live", performing "Respect" (with Miho Fukuhara) and "La La La". She also joined Mie in performing the Pink Lady hit single "Wanted (Shimei Tehai)".

== Discography ==
=== Studio albums ===
- Stop Motion (1992)
- Da Da Da (1993)
- U.Be Love (1993)
- Eien no Yume ni Mukatte (1994)
- La La La (1995)
- Power of Dreams (1997)
- Mother Earth (1998)
- O (2001)
- Presents (2002)
- Rhythm Black (2003)
- Happiness (2005)
- Positive Spiral (2008)
- Suppin (2010)
- Music Muscle (2018)
- Phoenix (2020)
- 55 Black (2025)
- 55 Red (2026)

== List of provided works ==
=== Lyricist ===
- Manish
  - Roman Sakusen Go and Go!
  - Sunao no Mama Kiss Shiyou!
  - Kimi he no Melody
  - Kimi ga Hoshii Zenbu ga Hoshii
  - Nemuranai Machi ni Nagasarete
- Nanase Aikawa
  - Shock of Love
- Tube
  - Natsuiro no Time Capsule
- La PomPon
  - Koi wa Su-gu Dance
  - Yada! Iyada! Yada! – Sweet Teens ver.-
- An Cafe
  - Sennen Dive!!!
- Hiromi Go
  - Irregular

=== Composer ===
- Silk
  - John Lenon ga Kikoeru Yoru
- Litz.Co
  - What do you wanna
- Keiko Utoku
  - Anata ni Aitai

== Magazine appearances ==
From Music Freak Magazine

- 1994 November Vol.1
- 1994 December–January Vol.2
- 1995 April Vol.5
- 1995 July Vol.5
- 1995 October Vol.10
- 1995 December Vol.12
- 1996 January Vol.13
- 1996 March Vol.15
- 1996 May Vol.18
- 1996 June Vol.19
- 1996 August Vol.21
- 1996 September Vol.22
- 1996 October Vol.23
- 1996 November Vol.24
- 1997 January Vol.25
- 1997 April Vol.29
- 1997 May Vol.30
- 1997 June Vol.31
- 1997 July Vol.32
- 1997 August Vol.33
- 1997 September Vol.34
- 1997 December Vol.37
- 1998 January Vol.38
- 1998 February Vol.39
- 1998 August Vol.45
- 1998 September Vol.46
- 1998 October Vol.47
- 1999 February Vol.51
- 1999 April Vol.53
- 1999 May Vol.54
- 1999 June Vol.55
- 1999 July Vol.56
- 1999 August Vol.57
- 1999 September Vol.58
- 1999 December Vol.61
- 2000 January Vol.62
- 2000 March Vol.64
- 2000 August Vol.69
- 2001 July Vol.80

From J-Rock Magazine

- 1995 September
- 1996 September
- 1997 October
- 1999 October

== See also ==
- List of best-selling music artists in Japan
