= Suppin =

Studio album by Maki Ohguro
- Released: 25 August 2010
- Recorded: 2008–2010
- Genre: Japanese pop
- Length: 71:00
- Label: 32 Records
- Producer: Maki Ohguro

Maki Ohguro chronology
| Positive Spiral (2008) | Suppin (2010) | Greatest Hits 1991-2016 ~All Singles +~ (2016) |

Singles from Suppin
- 1. "Our Home" Released: 1 October 2008; 2. "It's All Right" Released: 19 May 2010

Suppin (すっぴん) is the thirteenth studio album by Japanese J-pop singer and songwriter Maki Ohguro. It was released on 25 August 2010 under new label 32 Records.

This album consist of two previously released singles, "Our Home" and "It's All Right".

The album is released in two formats: regular CD edition and limited CD+DVD edition. DVD disc consist of live footages, music video clip of It's All Right and self liner notes.

The album reached No. 29 in its first week on the Oricon chart. The album charted four weeks and sold 7,000 copies.

This is her last studio album before a six-year hiatus.

In 2016, she returns with a compilation album Greatest Hits 1991-2016 ~All Singles +~ under the Being Inc. label.

== Track listing ==
All lyrics are written by Maki Ohguro; all music is composed by Maki Ohguro

| No. | Title | Arrangers | Length |
|---|---|---|---|
| 1. | "Kimi wa XXXXX (君は○○○○○)" | Yoshiaki Fujisawa | 4:13 |
| 2. | "Learn to Dance" | AKIRA | 6:25 |
| 3. | "Wild Flower" | Yuusuke Itadaki | 4:29 |
| 4. | "Our Home" | Yohey | 5:03 |
| 5. | "Rock & Shout" | Kei Kawano | 4:21 |
| 6. | "Take Off" | Kawano | 5:37 |
| 7. | "Calling You" | Yohey | 4:50 |
| 8. | "Hitori Bocchi (ひとりぼっち)" | Kawano | 7:13 |
| 9. | "!Baila! !Baila! !Baila!" | Orquesta de La Luz | 4:41 |
| 10. | "It's All Right" | Yohey | 6:19 |
| 11. | "Life ~episode VII Zasetsu~ (LIFE 〜episodeVII 挫折〜)" | Yohey | 9:11 |
| 12. | "Suppin (すっぴん)" | Kawano | 7:49 |

== In media ==
- It's All Right: ending theme for Tokyo Broadcasting System Television Hiru Obi!
