= Music Muscle =

Studio album by Maki Ohguro
- Released: 5 December 2018
- Recorded: 2016–2018
- Genre: Japanese pop
- Length: 60:16 (Disc 1); 60:01 (Disc 2)
- Label: Being Inc.
- Producer: Maki Ohguro

Maki Ohguro chronology
Greatest Hits 1991-2016 ~All Singles +~ (2016)	Music Muscle (2018)	Phoenix (2020)

Singles from Music Muscle
- 1. "Higher↗↗Higher↗↗" Released: 10 August 2016 (Digital single); 2. "Lie, Lie, Lie" Released: 27 September 2017 (CD); 3. "Latitude: Ashita ga Kuru kara" Released: 26 October 2017 (Digital single); 4. "Zoom Up★" Released: 26 October 2017 (Digital single); 5. "Because...You" Released: 27 May 2018 (Digital single); 6. "CRASH&RUSH feat. doa" Released: 27 May 2018 (Digital single); 7. "Spot Light" Released: 20 June 2018 (Digital single); 8. "Onna wa Tsuraiyo" Released: 20 July 2018 (Digital single); 9. "Oyashin Blues" Released: 20 August 2018 (Digital single); 10. "Harmony" Released: 20 September 2018 (Digital single); 11. "MUSIC MUSCLE" Released: 20 October 2018 (Digital single)

Music Muscle is the fourteenth studio album by Japanese singer-songwriter Maki Ohguro.

== Release ==
The album was released on 5 December 2018 under the Being Inc. label. It's her first studio album for the first time in 8 years. For this album, Ohguro works with music production team from the Being, the label which she debuted.

This album was released in two formats: regular 2-disc edition and limited first press edition with DVD. The DVD disc includes music videoclips and making footage for the songs Music Muscle, Lie Lie Lie, My Will, Latitude and Zoom Up.

== Promotion ==
=== Singles ===
This album consist of eleven previously released singles, of which thirteen were released as digital singles and one was released in CD format.

Digital single Higher Higher was released on 10 August 2016. On the same day, Maki announced her comeback to the music industry. The single served as a television commercial song to the Mizuno Corporation's "Wave Rider 20".

Album track My Will was released in 2016 as a part of the compilation album Greatest Hits 1991-2016 ~All Singles +~ (along with Higher Higher) and served as a theme song to the 10th season of the TV Asahi television drama of Kasouken no Onna.

Compact disc single Lie Lie Lie was released on 27 September 2017. It become her only single to be released in this format as of February 2020. The single served as an opening theme to the anime television series Detective Conan. The B-side track Revenge was used as a theme song for the Chinese animated series Master of Skill. The single was commercially successful: it debuted at number 20 on the Oricon single weekly charts and charted for 4 weeks.

The following digitals singles were released in various time periods. Two 2017 singles: "Latitude" and "Zoom Up" released simultaneously on 26 October 2017. Latitude served as a theme song and Zoom up at an insert theme song in the theatrical movie Shashin Kôshien 0.5 Byô no Natsu. Another two 2018 singles: "Because You" and "Crush&Rush" were from 27 May 2018. From June to October 2018, the release pace has changed to the one digital single per month, mainly to promote the release of Music Muscle album.

== Commercial performance ==
The album reached #30 in its first week and charted for 4 weeks.

== Track listing ==
=== Disc 1: Fighting Muscle ===
All lyrics are written by Maki Ohguro; all music is composed by Maki Ohguro (expect #13, co-written by Kenta Harada).

No.	Title	Arranger(s)	Length
1.	"Love Muscle" (digital single)	Akihito Tokunaga
2.	"Higher↗↗Higher↗↗" (digital single)	DJ YUTAKA, m.c.A.T
3.	"Lie, Lie, Lie,"	Rockin’ MaMa
4.	"Revenge" (coupling track from the Lie Lie Lie)	Rockin’ MaMa
5.	"Egao no Tobira (笑顔のトビラ)"	Tokunaga	4:53
6.	"My Will: Sekai wa Kaerarenakutemo (世界は変えられなくても)" (digital single)	Tokunaga	3:47
7.	"Naturally"	Akira Onozuka feat. DIMENSION & KENNY from SPiCYSOL	4:14
8.	"Spotlight"	Daisuke Ikeda	3:09
9.	"Naite Iindayo (泣いていいんだよ)"	Hirokazu Ogura	4:12
10.	"Because, You..." (digital single)	Michiya Haruhata from TUBE	5:26
11.	"Toki no Shizuku (時のしづく)"	Yoshito Tanaka feat.Zebra	4:26
12.	"FIGHT★GO☆FIGHT: Tatake Bloody Heart"	Akira feat.Takuya	4:26
13.	"Explosion"	Kenta Harada	4:25
14.	"Latitude: Ashita ga Kurukara~ (明日が来るから～)" (digital single)	Tokunaga	4:20

=== Disc 2: Resting Muscle ===
All lyrics are written by Maki Ohguro; all music is composed by Maki Ohguro (expect #9, co-written by Kenta Harada).

No.	Title	Arranger(s)	Length
1.	"Onna wa Tsuraiyo (女はつらいよ)" (digital single)	Kenta Harada
2.	"Oyagokoro Blues (親心ブルース)" (digital single)	DJ YUTAKA, m.c.A.T
3.	"Marin Tower ni Todoku made (マリンタワーに着くまでに)"	Akihito Tokunaga
4.	"Teppan Gāru (鉄板ガール)"	Mito Katsuyuki
5.	"Higher↗↗Higher↗↗ ～Salsa ver.～"	Hitoshi Aikawa feat.Orquesta de la Luz	4:53
6.	"Anata wa Watashi no Kurushima ga Wakarimasuka (あなたは私の苦しみがわかりますか)"	Satsuki Kusui	3:47
7.	"Mama Forever" (coupling track from the Lie Lie Lie)	Toshitaka Shibata	4:14
8.	"Harmony" (digital single)	Tokunaga	3:09
9.	"CRASH & RUSH" (digital single)	Harada	4:12
10.	"Zoom Up★" (digital single)	Harada feat.Booooze	5:26
11.	"Tokyo Rock&Roll (東京 ロケンロー)"	Reiran	4:26
