= Eien no Yume ni Mukatte =

Studio album by Maki Ohguro
- Released: 9 November 1994
- Recorded: 1993–1994
- Genre: Rock; power pop; new wave; soul
- Length: 52:00
- Label: B-Gram
- Producer: BMF

Maki Ohguro chronology
U.Be Love (1993)	Eien no Yume ni Mukatte (1994)	La La La (1995)

Singles from Eien no Yume ni Mukatte
- 1. "Anata Dake Mitsumeteru" Released: 10 December 1993; 2. "Shiroi Graduation" Released: 29 January 1994; 3. "Natsu ga Kuru!" Released: 23 April 1994; 4. "Eien no Yume ni Mukatte" Released: 5 October 1994

Eien no Yume ni Mukatte (永遠の夢に向かって) is the fourth studio album by Japanese J-pop singer and songwriter Maki Ohguro. It was released on 9 November 1994 under B-Gram Records.

The album consist of four previously released singles, Anata Dake Mitsumeteru, Shiroi Graduation, Natsu ga Kuru and Eien no Yume ni Mukatte. All of these four singles become her big hits which sold more than 400,000 copies, except of Anata Dake Mitsumeteru and Natsu ga Kuru which sold more than million copies.

The album reached No. 1 in its first week on the Oricon chart. The album sold 1,583,000 copies. It's her the first album which reached million sold copies. It got rewarded with Gold disc by Recording Industry Association of Japan.

== Track listing ==
All tracks arranged by Takeshi Hayama.

All lyrics are written by Maki Ohguro; all music is composed by Maki Ohguro (expect #3 and #5, Seiichiro Kuribayashi)

No.	Title	Length
1.	"Eien no Yume ni Mukatta (永遠の夢に向かって)"	4:41
2.	"Rocks"	5:24
3.	"Tomadoinagara (戸惑いながら)"	4:52
4.	"Anata Dake Mitsumeteru (あなただけ見つめてる)"	4:44
5.	"Return To My Love"	4:39
6.	"Stay with me baby"	4:04
7.	"Kodoku Gaoka ni Mieru Yuuhi (孤独ヶ丘に見える夕陽)"	4:08
8.	"Gypsy"	5:43
9.	"Shiroi Gradation (白いGradation)"	3:57
10.	"Rainy Days"	4:34
11.	"Natsu ga Kuru (夏が来る)"	4:46

== In media ==
- Anata dake Mitsumeteru: ending theme for Anime television series Slam Dunk
- Eien no Yume ni Mukatte: opening theme for Tokyo Broadcasting System Television program Count Down TV
- Natsu ga Kuru: opening theme for Tokyo Broadcasting System Television program Count Down TV
- Shiroi Graduation: commercial film song for company Xebio's Victoria
