= Power of Dreams (album) =

Studio album by Maki Ohguro
- Released: 6 August 1997
- Recorded: 1996–1997
- Genres: Pop rock; soul; funk; new wave; dance-pop
- Length: 61:00
- Label: B-Gram
- Producer: BMF

Maki Ohguro chronology
La La La (1995)	Power of Dreams (1997)	Mother Earth (1998)

Singles from Power of Dreams
- 1. "Aah" Released: 26 February 1996; 2. "Atsuku nare" Released: 8 July 1996; 3. "Unbalance" Released: 2 December 1996; 4. "Genki Dashite" Released: 26 March 1997; 5. "Sora" Released: 28 May 1997

Power of Dreams is the sixth studio album by Japanese J-pop singer and songwriter Maki Ohguro. It was released on 6 August 1997 under B-Gram Records.

== Album ==
The album consist of the five previously released singles, such as Aah, Atsuku Nare, Unbalance, Genki Dashite and Sora.

Atsuku Nare is one of her biggest hits, having sold more than million copies. It received a new album mix under title Album version. The album has a total of 14 tracks which makes this the longest studio album in Ohguro’s career.

The single Aishitemasu didn't make it to this album, instead it was released in her the first compilation album Back Beats #1. Kaze ni nare was originally supposed to be released as a single, however it was postponed for unknown reasons and end up being releasing on this album as the part of the album tracks.

== Reception ==
The album reached No. 1 in its first week on the Oricon chart, finally selling 1,755,000 copies. It was Ohguro’s most successful studio album. It received a Gold disc from the Recording Industry Association of Japan.

== Track listing ==
All lyrics are written by Maki Ohguro; all music is composed by Maki Ohguro (expect of #1, by Takeshi Hayama)

No.	Title	Arrangers	Length
1.	"Mistral" (instrumental)	Takeshi Hayama	0:32
2.	"Unbalance (アンバランス)"	Hayama	5:11
3.	"Atsuku nare (熱くなれ)" (album version)	Hayama	4:20
4.	"Aah (あぁ)"	Hayama	4:31
5.	"Power Of Dream"	Hayama	4:41
6.	"Aishitetanda (愛してたんだ)"	Hayama	5:16
7.	"Sora (空)"	Hayama	4:45
8.	"Afternoon Café"	Hayama	5:34
9.	"Sunshine"	Hiroshi Terao	2:16
10.	"Genki Dashite (ゲンキダシテ)"	Hayama	4:59
11.	"OH-MENI-MITE-YO!!"	Hayama	4:46
12.	"Ijiwaru (イジワル)"	Hayama	3:53
13.	"Shite shite♠♦♣♥(シ・テ・シ・テ♠♦♣♥)"	Hayama	4:19
14.	"Kaze ni nare (風になれ)"	Hayama	5:54

== In media ==
- Mistral: opening theme to TV Asahi news broadcast ANN NEWS
- Unbalance: theme song for TV Asahi program X File's 2nd season
- Atsuku Nare: broadcast theme song for NHK's Atlanta 1996
- Aah: theme song for TV Asahi television drama Aji Ichi Monme 2nd season
- Sora: opening theme for Anime television series Chūka Ichiban!
- Genki dashite: commercial song for Asahi Soft Drinks's Mitsuya Cider
