= Stop Motion (EP) =

EP by Maki Ohguro
- Released: 24 June 1992 (EMI Music Japan); 2 February 1994 (B-Gram Records)
- Recorded: 1991–1992
- Genre: Japanese pop
- Length: 34 minutes
- Label: B-Gram
- Producer: Daiko Nagato

Maki Ohguro chronology
Stop Motion (1992)	Da Da Da (1993)

Singles from Stop Motion
- 1. "Stop Motion" Released: 27 May 1992

Stop Motion is the debut EP by Japanese J-pop singer and songwriter Maki Ohguro released on 24 June 1992 under EMI Music Japan.

== Album ==
The album consist of one previously released single, same titled with new arrangement and 6 newly recorded songs.

== Promotion ==
=== Singles ===
"Stop Motion" is a Ohguro's debut single released on 27 May 1992 under EMI Music Japan. The single is a cover of the song, originally written for the Japanese singer Silk released in 1991 under title Stop Motion:Eien Ni. The single served as a theme song to the Japanese television drama "Onna Jiken Kisha Tachibana Keiko". The single has debuted very poorly, only at number 67 on the Oricon Album Weekly Charts and overall 19k copies.

=== Others ===
The song "Stay" has been originally recorded in 1991 and used as an insert theme song to the Japanese television drama Hotel Woman. It was previously included on its television soundtrack release.

== Chart performance ==
The album reached No. 58 rank first week and charted for two weeks and selling a 9,000 copies.

== Track listing ==
All lyrics are written by Maki Ohguro; all music is composed by Maki Ohguro.

No.	Title	Arrangers	Length
1.	"Aitsu ni Say (あいつにSAY)"	Takeshi Hayama	3:46
2.	"Stop Motion" (album version)	Masao Akashi	5:11
3.	"That's Ike Ike Sengen!! (That's イケイケ宣言!!)"	Daisuke Ikeda	4:19
4.	"Time&Time"	Hayama	5:25
5.	"Kaze ni Fukarete (風に吹かれて)"	Hayama	5:36
6.	"Futari (ふたり)"	Ikeda	5:26
7.	"Stay"	Akashi	4:24
Total length:			34:11

- Note: The track list is taken from the artists official website and production list of staff from the booklet of the album.

== Release history ==
Year	Format(s)	Serial number	Label(s)	Ref.
1992	CD	TOCT-6503	EMi Music Japan	-
1994	CD	BGCH-1009	B-Gram Records	-
2019	digital download, streaming	-	B Zone	
